= 2003 Tampa Bay Buccaneers season =

NFL team season

- Owner: Malcolm Glazer
- General manager: Rich McKay
- Head coach: Jon Gruden
- Home stadium: Raymond James Stadium

Results
- Record: 7–9
- Division place: 3rd NFC South
- Playoffs: Did not qualify
- All-Pros: LB Derrick Brooks (2nd team); DE Simeon Rice (2nd team)
- Pro Bowlers: 4: LB Derrick Brooks; WR Keenan McCardell; DE Simeon Rice; DT Warren Sapp
- Team MVP: WR Keenan McCardell

The 2003 Tampa Bay Buccaneers season was the franchise's 28th season in the National Football League (NFL), the 6th playing their home games at Raymond James Stadium, and the 2nd under head coach Jon Gruden. The season began with the Buccaneers attempting to defend their Super Bowl XXXVII title of the 2002 season along with becoming the first team to win back to back Super Bowls since the 1998 Denver Broncos and the first NFC team to win back to back Super Bowls since the 1993 Dallas Cowboys. Despite high expectations, several last-minute losses led to locker room tension and front-office struggles. The Buccaneers finished 7–9, and missed the playoffs for the first time since 1998 and finished with a losing record for the first time since 1996.

The season started out on a positive note, as the Buccaneers defeated their bitter rival from the three previous postseasons, the Philadelphia Eagles. It was the first game in Lincoln Financial Field, and with a 17–0 shutout victory, it appeared Tampa Bay had picked up right where they had left off the season before. Their home opener against the Carolina Panthers in week 2 was a disappointment, however, as special teams woes thwarted what would have been a game-winning touchdown as time expired. The go-ahead extra point was blocked, and Tampa Bay lost in overtime. The worst was yet to come, however. In week 5, the team blew a 35–14 lead in the final four minutes and lost to the Indianapolis Colts on Monday Night Football, the night that former coach Tony Dungy returned to Tampa Bay. The team began to unravel, both on the field and off the field, with injuries piling up, and locker room tensions mounting.

Combined with the Oakland Raiders' dismal 4–12 performance, neither Super Bowl team reached the playoffs that year. This situation would not happen again until the 2016 season when both the Denver Broncos and the Carolina Panthers, the two Super Bowl participants for the 2015 season, would miss the playoffs. This was the most recent season that a Super Bowl champion had a losing record following the Super Bowl until the injury plagued Los Angeles Rams in 2022.

== Front office tension ==
Soon after the team's victory in Super Bowl XXXVII over the Oakland Raiders, a growing number of press reports had indicated Gruden’s lack of patience with general manager Rich McKay. McKay was a major architect of the Buccaneers' rebuilding effort over the previous ten years, and he, like Gruden, had long-established ties to the Tampa Bay area. However, as the 2003 season wore on, the Gruden/McKay relationship deteriorated as the Buccaneers struggled on the field. In November, Keyshawn Johnson was deactivated by the team ten games into the season for his conduct, which included sideline arguments with coaches and players. Johnson was eventually traded to the Dallas Cowboys for wide receiver Joey Galloway.

Along with the Johnson de-activation, injuries sidelined several players during the season. The starting roster from Opening Day looked drastically different by November, particularly on offense. Opening day starters such as Mike Alstott, Brian Kelly, Greg Spires, and Kenyatta Walker, along with Joe Jurevicius, John Howell, Tim Wansley, Darian Barnes, and Ellis Wyms all ended up on injured reserve. By Thanksgiving, the starting running back became lesser-known Thomas Jones, with on-again, off-again third-string receiver Charles Lee elevated to starter. Though quarterback Brad Johnson started all 16 games – a feat he did not accomplish in the Buccaneers' Super Bowl season the previous year – he was benched while losing in the final week during a "meaningless" game against Tennessee.

In December, the Glazers allowed McKay to leave the Buccaneers organization before the end of the regular season. He promptly joined the Atlanta Falcons as president and general manager. Thus, McKay watched his first game as a Falcons executive sitting next to owner Arthur Blank in a Raymond James Stadium skybox in week 16, in which the Falcons defeated the Buccaneers 30–28, thus eliminating them from playoff contention.

== Staff ==
2003 Tampa Bay Buccaneers staff
Front office: Owner/President – Malcolm Glazer; General manager – Rich McKay; Head coaches: Head coach – Jon Gruden; Assistant head coach/defensive line – Rod Marinelli; Offensive coaches: Offensive coordinator/offensive line – Bill Muir; Quarterbacks – Stan Parrish; Running backs – Kirby Wilson; Wide receivers – Richard Mann; Tight ends – Art Valero; Offensive assistant – Jay Gruden; Offensive quality control – Jeremy Bates; Offensive quality control – Jim Pyne	Defensive coaches: Defensive coordinator – Monte Kiffin; Linebackers – Joe Barry; Defensive backs – Mike Tomlin; Defensive assistant – Raheem Morris; Special teams coaches: Special teams coordinator – Richard Bisaccia; Strength and conditioning: Director of player development – Cedric Saunders; Strength and conditioning coordinator – Garrett Giemont; Assistant strength and conditioning – Mike Morris

== Roster ==
2003 Tampa Bay Buccaneers roster
Quarterbacks (QB): 14 Brad Johnson; 10 Shaun King; 2 Chris Simms; Running backs (RB): 43 Jameel Cook FB; 22 Thomas Jones; 37 Cecil Martin FB; 32 Michael Pittman; 27 Aaron Stecker; Wide receivers (WR): 84 Reggie Barlow; 19 Keyshawn Johnson; 82 Charles Lee; 87 Keenan McCardell; 3 Edell Shepherd; 86 Karl Williams; Tight ends (TE): 85 Ken Dilger; 88 Rickey Dudley; 89 Will Heller; 81 Roland Williams; 80 Todd Yoder	Offensive linemen (OL): 60 Cosey Coleman G; 69 Anthony Davis T; 74 Cornell Green T; 71 Kerry Jenkins G; 62 Austin King C; 78 Sean Mahan C/G; 72 Roman Oben T; 76 John Wade C; 65 Jason Whittle G; Defensive linemen (DL): 91 Chuck Darby DT; 92 Anthony McFarland DT; 61 Cleveland Pinkney DT; 97 Simeon Rice DE; 99 Warren Sapp DT; 98 Corey Smith DE; 90 Dewayne White DE	Linebackers (LB): 55 Derrick Brooks OLB; 56 Ryan Nece OLB; 53 Shelton Quarles MLB; 57 Dwayne Rudd OLB; 52 Nate Webster MLB; 95 Reinard Wilson OLB; Defensive backs (DB): 20 Ronde Barber CB; 21 Scott Frost FS; 34 David Gibson SS; 35 Corey Ivy CB; 47 John Lynch SS; 23 Jermaine Phillips FS; 28 Travaris Robinson CB/S; 26 Dwight Smith CB/FS/SS; 29 Ronyell Whitaker CB; Special teams (ST): 66 Ryan Benjamin LS; 7 Martín Gramática K; 9 Tom Tupa P	Practice squad: 77 Kevin Breedlove G/T; 49 Michael Brown LB; 73 Ben Claxton C/G; 18 Fabian Davis WR; Reserve: 40 Mike Alstott FB (IR); 30 Darian Barnes FB (IR); 24 Torrie Cox CB (IR); 38 John Howell S (IR); 83 Joe Jurevicius WR (IR); 25 Brian Kelly CB (IR); 5 Than Merrill S (NF-Inj.); 94 Greg Spires DE (IR); 36 Tony Taylor RB (IR); 67 Kenyatta Walker T (IR); 31 Tim Wansley CB (IR); 96 Ellis Wyms DE (IR); Rookies in italics 53 active, 12 reserve, 4 practice squad

== Schedule ==
=== Preseason ===
Week	Date	Opponent	Result	Record	Venue	Recap
1	August 2	vs. New York Jets	**W** 30–14	1–0	(Japan) Tokyo Dome {Tokyo)	Recap
2	August 8	at Miami Dolphins	**W** 20–19	2–0	Pro Player Stadium	Recap
3	August 18	at St. Louis Rams	**L** 16–26	2–1	Edward Jones Dome	Recap
4	August 23	Jacksonville Jaguars	**W** 10–6	3–1	Raymond James Stadium	Recap
5	August 28	Houston Texans	**W** 34–3	4–1	Raymond James Stadium	Recap

=== Regular season ===
Week	Date	Opponent	Result	Record	Venue	Recap
1	September 8	at Philadelphia Eagles	**W** 17–0	1–0	Lincoln Financial Field	Recap
2	September 14	**Carolina Panthers**	**L** 9–12 (OT)	1–1	Raymond James Stadium	Recap
3	September 21	at **Atlanta Falcons**	**W** 31–10	2–1	Georgia Dome	Recap
4	Bye					
5	October 6	Indianapolis Colts	**L** 35–38 (OT)	2–2	Raymond James Stadium	Recap
6	October 12	at Washington Redskins	**W** 35–13	3–2	FedExField	Recap
7	October 19	at San Francisco 49ers	**L** 7–24	3–3	3Com Park	Recap
8	October 26	Dallas Cowboys	**W** 16–0	4–3	Raymond James Stadium	Recap
9	November 2	**New Orleans Saints**	**L** 14–17	4–4	Raymond James Stadium	Recap
10	November 9	at **Carolina Panthers**	**L** 24–27	4–5	Ericsson Stadium	Recap
11	November 16	Green Bay Packers	**L** 13–20	4–6	Raymond James Stadium	Recap
12	November 24	New York Giants	**W** 19–13	5–6	Raymond James Stadium	Recap
13	November 30	at Jacksonville Jaguars	**L** 10–17	5–7	Alltel Stadium	Recap
14	December 7	at **New Orleans Saints**	**W** 14–7	6–7	Louisiana Superdome	Recap
15	December 14	Houston Texans	**W** 16–3	7–7	Raymond James Stadium	Recap
16	December 20	**Atlanta Falcons**	**L** 28–30	7–8	Raymond James Stadium	Recap
17	December 28	at Tennessee Titans	**L** 13–33	7–9	The Coliseum	Recap

Note: Division games in bold text.

== Game summaries ==
=== Week 1: at Philadelphia Eagles ===
	1	2	3	4	Total
Buccaneers	0	3	7	7	17
Eagles	0	0	0	0	0

The Buccaneers appeared to start the 2003 regular season where they left off. The Buccaneers opened on Monday night, against the Eagles, at the new Lincoln Financial Field. It was a rematch of the previous season's NFC Championship. The Buccaneers impressively beat the Eagles 17–0. Joe Jurevicius led the team with two touchdown catches. His second came via a "circus catch" in which he tipped the ball up into the air, rebounding it to himself, and making the reception.

=== Week 2: Carolina Panthers ===
	1	2	3	4	OT	Total
Panthers	3	3	3	0	3	12
Buccaneers	0	0	3	6	0	9

The Buccaneers home opener against division foe Carolina turned into an embarrassment. A defensive-oriented game saw young Carolina quarterback Jake Delhomme held to only 9-for-23, 96 yards and two interceptions. Meanwhile, Brad Johnson threw for 339 yards. Unfortunately, special teams breakdowns cost the team dearly. Contributing to the frustrating day, the Buccaneers committed 17 penalties for 168 yards.

After two earlier botched field goal attempts, the Buccaneers trailed 9–3 late in the fourth quarter. On the last play of regulation, Brad Johnson connected to Keenan McCardell for a dramatic game-tying touchdown pass in the back of the endzone time expired. The extra point would have given Tampa Bay the win. Martin Gramatica's extra point attempt, however, was blocked. The game went to overtime tied 9–9.

Both teams traded possessions, and with just over 6 minutes left in the overtime period, Tampa Bay punted to Carolina. Steve Smith returned the punt 52 yards to the Tampa Bay 40-yard line. Five plays later, Carolina won 12–9 after a 47-yard field goal.

=== Week 3: at Atlanta Falcons ===
	1	2	3	4	Total
Buccaneers	3	14	14	0	31
Falcons	0	3	7	0	10

Falcons quarterback Michael Vick was sidelined due to an injury in the preseason. Doug Johnson took over, and the Buccaneers dominated. They held Doug Johnson to only 95 passing yards, and three interceptions. His fourth quarter replacement, Kurt Kittner did not fare any better.

The Tampa Bay offense rebounded with Warren Sapp playing tight end and scoring his first career offensive touchdown catch. Mike Alstott put the game well out of reach with two third-quarter touchdown runs.

=== Week 5: Indianapolis Colts ===
	1	2	3	4	OT	Total
Colts	0	0	7	28	3	38
Buccaneers	14	7	7	7	0	35

On October 6, the Buccaneers hosted the Indianapolis Colts on Monday Night Football. It marked former coach Tony Dungy’s return to Tampa Bay, and he was well received by fans. During pre-game warm-ups, Warren Sapp stirred up controversy when he skipped through the Colts players, who were spread out over the field stretching. It was Sapp's second such “skipping” incident (the first in 2002 against the Steelers), and he drew considerable criticism.

Most of the game was one-sided, with the Buccaneers dominating the first half. On the first play of their second drive, Brad Johnson connected with Keenan McCardell for a 74-yard touchdown, and a 7–0 lead. On the next drive, at their own 33-yard line, Johnson was intercepted by Mike Doss at the Colts 41-yard line. Doss, however, was tackled by John Wade, who punched the ball out and forced a fumble. The ball bounced into the hands of Keenan McCardell, and McCardell ran 57 yards for an improbable fumble recovery touchdown and a 14–0 score. Tampa Bay entered halftime leading 21–0.

With 5:09 remaining in the fourth quarter, Ronde Barber intercepted Peyton Manning and returned the ball 29 yards for a touchdown, and put the Buccaneers up 35–14.

With most of the fans beginning to head for the exits, Indianapolis started an improbable rally. Tampa Bay kicked off, and the ball was returned 90 yards to the 11-yard line. Four plays later, with 3:37 remaining, Indianapolis scored a touchdown on a fourth-down play, to narrow the lead to 35–21. Colts kicker Mike Vanderjagt then attempted an onside kick, which sailed airborne and was caught by Colts safety Idrees Bashir at their own 42-yard line. It was later determined by NFL officials that the onside kick was recovered illegally, since it never touched the ground, nor was touched by a Tampa Bay player. The critical error by the officiating crew led by referee Johnny Grier was overlooked, and the game continued.

The Colts scored another touchdown, and narrowed the margin 35–28. Another onside kick attempt was made, but this time it was recovered by Tampa Bay. Tampa Bay attempted to run the clock down to the two-minute warning, but a personal foul by Kenyatta Walker stopped the clock at 2:04 remaining. The Buccaneers were forced to punt with 1:48 to go. Manning then led the Colts on an 87-yard touchdown drive to tie the score 35–35 with 0:35 remaining. In overtime, kicker Mike Vanderjagt missed a 40-yard field goal, but umpire Ed Coukart called a penalty on Simeon Rice for leaping, a rarely seen unsportsmanlike conduct infraction for running and jumping to block a kick and landing on other players. Vanderjagt's subsequent kick was partially blocked and hit the upright, but went through, winning the game for the Colts.

It was the largest comeback in NFL history (21 points) in that little amount of time (under 4 minutes to go). With the game-winning field goal, Vanderjagt went on to become the first kicker in NFL history not to miss a kick attempt in a complete season, including the playoffs. The game was named #3 on NFL Top 10's Top Ten Comebacks.

=== Week 6: at Washington Redskins ===
	1	2	3	4	Total
Buccaneers	0	7	7	21	35
Redskins	3	7	3	0	13

The devastating loss to the Colts seemed to start a downward trend for the team. Injuries sidelined several players, including Mike Alstott and Brian Kelly. Before the game, Warren Sapp was involved in his second "skipping" incident in two weeks, and third overall, as he bumped into an NFL referee. The incident drew a $50,000 fine.

Despite the growing trouble, the Buccaneers managed to beat Steve Spurrier’s slumping Redskins. Brad Johnson threw four touchdown passes, and Derrick Brooks iced the game with a 44-yard interception return touchdown.

=== Week 7: at San Francisco 49ers ===
	1	2	3	4	Total
Buccaneers	7	0	0	0	7
49ers	7	14	0	3	24

Brad Johnson threw three interceptions, and the Buccaneer defense gave up 212 yards rushing, falling to the San Francisco 49ers. Tampa Bay's only highlight, and only score, was a 75-yard touchdown pass to Keenan McCardell in the first quarter.

=== Week 8: Dallas Cowboys ===
	1	2	3	4	Total
Cowboys	0	0	0	0	0
Buccaneers	0	10	6	0	16

In a largely defensive game, so-called “Buc Ball” prevailed. Tampa Bay shut out Bill Parcells’ Dallas Cowboys by a score of 16–0. The defense forced three turnovers, and held the #4-ranked Dallas offense to just over 200 total yards and no points.

=== Week 9: New Orleans Saints ===
	1	2	3	4	Total
Saints	0	7	7	3	17
Buccaneers	0	0	0	14	14

After a touchdown pass, and an interception return, the New Orleans Saints held a 14–0 lead. With under 8 minutes to go in regulation, Brad Johnson threw two touchdown passes (26 and 30 yards) to Michael Pittman and Keenan McCardell to tie the score at 14–14. With 2:08 to go New Orleans took over. The Buccaneer defense failed to hold ground, and the Saints kicked a game-winning field goal with 8 seconds left.

=== Week 10: at Carolina Panthers ===
	1	2	3	4	Total
Buccaneers	7	0	0	17	24
Panthers	10	0	10	7	27

Carolina broke out to a 20–7 lead through three quarters. Brad Johnson led the Buccaneers on a rally, scoring two touchdown passes, a 23-yarder to Keyshawn Johnson and 36 yards to Keenan McCardell, and Tampa Bay took a 21–20 lead with 4:52 remaining.

Two plays later, Tim Wansley intercepted Jake Delhomme for the second time in the game. The turnover led to a Martin Gramatica field goal, and a Tampa Bay lead of 24–20 with 2:45 to go. The Buccaneer defense, however, failed to keep Carolina at bay, and Delhomme swiftly led the Panthers to a game-winning touchdown with 1:11 left.

Early in the fourth quarter, Simeon Rice sacked Jake Delhomme for a 9-yard loss. It marked the 69th consecutive game the Buccaneer defense registered a quarterback sack, a new all-time NFL record.

=== Week 11: Green Bay Packers ===
	1	2	3	4	Total
Packers	7	6	0	7	20
Buccaneers	0	6	7	0	13

The longtime rival Green Bay Packers came to town in November, and Tampa Bay appeared to be poised for a win. A 17-play, 98-yard fourth-quarter touchdown drive by the Packers wore out a tired Buccaneer defense, and Tampa Bay lost to Green Bay for the first time at Raymond James Stadium. The loss dropped Tampa Bay to 4–6, and severely hampered their playoff chances.

During the game, Martin Gramatica became the franchise’s all-time scoring leader. One distinction came to an end, however. The Tampa Bay defense had, one week earlier, set the all-time NFL record for consecutive game with a quarterback sack. They achieved no sacks in this game, and the streak ended at 69 games.

Wide receiver Keyshawn Johnson finished the game with only three catches for 34 yards. He was also heckled and booed by fans during the game. The following day, after several weeks of growing intra-team tension, Johnson was deactivated with pay from the playing roster for the balance of the season.

=== Week 12: New York Giants ===
	1	2	3	4	Total
Giants	0	6	0	7	13
Buccaneers	0	14	3	2	19

On Monday Night Football, Tampa Bay hosted the New York Giants in their return to Tampa since Super Bowl XXXV. Thomas Jones scored early in the second quarter, and Charles Lee scored a touchdown catch. Just when they thought the season was finished a week before, the Buccaneers pulled out an important victory and moved to 5–6, snapping a three-game losing streak.

With the victory, the Buccaneers swept all four NFC East teams for the season.

=== Week 13: at Jacksonville Jaguars ===
	1	2	3	4	Total
Buccaneers	0	10	0	0	10
Jaguars	0	10	0	7	17

An uninspired performance against in-state rival Jacksonville (who had a 2–9 record going into the game) on Sunday Night Football saw twelve combined penalties for 128 yards (eight for eighty by the Bucs), seven turnovers (four fumbles and three interceptions), and blown chances. Tampa Bay fell to 5–7 on the season

=== Week 14: at New Orleans Saints ===
	1	2	3	4	Total
Buccaneers	0	14	0	0	14
Saints	7	0	0	0	7

The Buccaneers took on division foe New Orleans, and beat them for the first time since December 2001. The Tampa Bay defense sacked Aaron Brooks seven times and forced three fumbles, meanwhile running back Deuce McAllister was held to just 88 yards.

Tampa Bay's offense performed well, with Brad Johnson throwing two touchdown passes, the second of which was to tight end Warren Sapp, his second touchdown reception of his career. After losing the ball in the lights, he grabbed it and was able to pull it in as he fell to the turf.

New Orleans was in the game until the waning seconds of the first half. With 1:49 to go in the second quarter, Joe Horn dropped a sure touchdown pass in the end zone. On the next play, Aaron Brooks was sacked and fumbled. Jermaine Phillips recovered the fumble, and returned it 20 yards. Tampa Bay took a 14–7 lead into halftime, and neither team scored again.

A couple days after the game, general manager Rich McKay was released by the team, allowed to pursue work elsewhere.

=== Week 15: Houston Texans ===
	1	2	3	4	Total
Texans	0	0	3	0	3
Buccaneers	7	6	3	0	16

Tampa Bay kept their postseason hopes alive, beating the second-year Texans 16–3, and improving to 7–7 on the year. The rainy day saw Thomas Jones take over the primary rushing duties, and run for 134 yards and one score. Warren Sapp sat out the game with a strained foot, his first game missed in 73 starts.

For the second time in five weeks, the Buccaneer defense ended a long streak. Dating back to October 19, 2000, Tampa Bay had a streak of 54 consecutive games with a turnover (takeaway). Against the Texans, there were no forced turnovers, and the streak fell short of the all-time NFL record (71 by Philadelphia).

With the victory, Tampa Bay improved to 7–7, and were still in the wild card hunt.

The Buccaneers would not defeat the Texans again until 2025.

=== Week 16: Atlanta Falcons ===
	1	2	3	4	Total
Falcons	10	17	3	0	30
Buccaneers	0	7	0	21	28

While still mathematically alive for the playoffs, the Buccaneers needed a victory over division rival Atlanta. A pitiful first half saw Brad Johnson throw two interceptions, and the Falcons jumped out to a 27–7 lead at halftime. Fans were heard booing the team as they went into the locker room at the half.

With just under four minutes remaining in regulation, Tampa Bay trailed 30–14. Falcons' T. J. Duckett fumbled on first & goal at the Tampa Bay 4 yard line, and the Buccaneers recovered. Four plays later, Johnson connected to Keenan McCardell for a 76-yard touchdown. A two-point conversion trimmed the score to 30–22.

Tampa Bay recovered an onside kick, and scored another touchdown with 34 seconds remaining. A second two-point conversion would have tied the game, and forced overtime. The pass failed, and Tampa Bay was eliminated from playoff contention, losing the game 30–28 to the Falcons.

Just six days before the game, former Buccaneers general manager Rich McKay was named the president and general manager of the Falcons. He spent the game in the visitor's press box, and presided over the Falcons' defeat of Tampa Bay.

=== Week 17: at Tennessee Titans ===
	1	2	3	4	Total
Buccaneers	3	0	3	7	13
Titans	3	13	10	7	33

After being eliminated from the playoffs, the Buccaneers traveled to take on the Titans in a largely meaningless game. Brad Johnson and Shaun King shared quarterback duties, but neither seemed able to get into a rhythm, throwing a combined 4 interceptions.

With the loss, Tampa Bay finished 7–9, and missed the playoffs for the first time since 1998.

== Standings ==
NFC South
	W	L	T	PCT	DIV	CONF	PF	PA	STK
^{(3)} Carolina Panthers	11	5	0	.688	5–1	9–3	325	304	W3
New Orleans Saints	8	8	0	.500	3–3	7–5	340	326	W1
Tampa Bay Buccaneers	7	9	0	.438	2–4	6–6	301	264	L2
Atlanta Falcons	5	11	0	.313	2–4	4–8	299	422	W2
