= 2001 Tampa Bay Buccaneers season =

NFL team season

- Owner: Malcolm Glazer
- General manager: Rich McKay
- Head coach: Tony Dungy
- Offensive coordinator: Clyde Christensen
- Defensive coordinator: Monte Kiffin
- Home stadium: Raymond James Stadium

Results
- Record: 9–7
- Division place: 3rd NFC Central
- Playoffs: Lost Wild Card Playoffs (at Eagles) 9–31
- All-Pros: 4: CB Ronde Barber; DT Warren Sapp; LB Derrick Brooks; SS John Lynch
- Pro Bowlers: 6: FB Mike Alstott; CB Ronde Barber; LB Derrick Brooks; WR Keyshawn Johnson; SS John Lynch; DT Warren Sapp
- Team MVP: WR Keyshawn Johnson

The 2001 Tampa Bay Buccaneers season was the franchise's 26th season in the National Football League (NFL) and the sixth and final under head coach Tony Dungy.

The season began with the team trying to improve on a 10–6 season. Quarterback Shaun King was benched, and Brad Johnson was brought in from free agency. Johnson broke Tampa Bay team records for passing yards (3,406), completions (340), and attempts (540). However, the team stumbled out of the gate, and started the season with a 3–4 record. The team rallied in the second half of the season, winning six of nine. They finished the season 9–7 and clinched a playoff spot for the fourth time in five seasons.

In the Wild Card playoffs Tampa Bay lost 31–9, to the Philadelphia Eagles. It was the second year in a row that Tampa Bay was routed in the wild card round by Philadelphia, not able to score a single touchdown either time. Two days later, Dungy was fired by the Buccaneers. Following the season, Randall McDaniel retired.

== Offseason ==
Additions	Subtractions
QB Brad Johnson (Redskins)	QB Eric Zeier (Falcons)
DE Simeon Rice (Cardinals)	DE Chidi Ahanotu (Rams)
	G Frank Middleton (Raiders)
	TE Patrick Hape (Broncos)
	LB Don Davis (Rams)
	G Kevin Dogins (Bears)
	DT Tyoka Jackson (Rams)
	S Damien Robinson (Jets)

=== NFL draft ===
2001 Tampa Bay Buccaneers draft
Round	Pick	Player	Position	College	Notes
1	14	Kenyatta Walker	Tackle	Florida	from Buffalo
3	84	Dwight Smith	Safety	Akron	
4	117	John Howell	Safety	Colorado State	
5	151	Russ Hochstein	Guard	Nebraska	
6	174	Jameel Cook	Fullback	Illinois	
6	183	Ellis Wyms	Defensive tackle	Mississippi State	
7	205	Dauntae' Finger	Tight end	North Carolina	
7	223	Than Merrill	Safety	Yale	
7	234	Joe Tafoya	Defensive end	Arizona	
Made roster * Made at least one Pro Bowl during career

== Personnel ==
=== Staff ===
2001 Tampa Bay Buccaneers staff
Front office: Owner/President – Malcolm Glazer; General manager – Rich McKay; Head coaches: Head coach – Tony Dungy; Offensive coaches: Offensive coordinator – Clyde Christensen; Quarterbacks – Jim Caldwell; Running backs – Tony Nathan; Wide receivers – Charlie Williams; Tight ends – Ricky Thomas; Offensive line – Chris Foerster; Offensive assistant – Kevin O'Dea	Defensive coaches: Defensive coordinator – Monte Kiffin; Defensive line – Rod Marinelli; Linebackers – Joe Barry; Defensive backs – Mike Tomlin; Defensive assistant – Alan Williams; Special teams coaches: Special teams – Joe Marciano; Strength and conditioning: Director of player development – Cedric Saunders; Strength and conditioning – Mark Asanovich; Assistant strength and conditioning – Les Ebert

=== Roster ===
2001 Tampa Bay Buccaneers roster
Quarterbacks: 1 Joe Hamilton; 14 Brad Johnson; 10 Shaun King; Running backs: 27 Rabih Abdullah; 40 Mike Alstott FB; 43 Jameel Cook FB; 28 Warrick Dunn; 22 Aaron Stecker KR; Wide receivers: 85 Reidel Anthony PR; 81 Jacquez Green; 19 Keyshawn Johnson; 87 Frank Murphy KR; 86 Karl Williams PR; 88 Milton Wynn; Tight ends: 83 Dave Moore; 89 Mike Roberg; 80 Todd Yoder	Offensive linemen: 62 Jeff Christy C; 60 Cosey Coleman G; 76 DeMarcus Curry T; 68 Shane Grice G; 65 Russ Hochstein G; 64 Randall McDaniel G; 69 Pete Pierson T; 67 Kenyatta Walker T; 75 Todd Washington C/G; 71 Jerry Wunsch T; Defensive linemen: 98 James Cannida DT; 91 Chuck Darby DE/DT; 78 Marcus Jones DE; 92 Anthony McFarland DT; 97 Simeon Rice DE; 99 Warren Sapp DT; 94 Steve White DE; 96 Ellis Wyms DE/DT	Linebackers: 55 Derrick Brooks OLB; 59 Jamie Duncan MLB; 50 Jeff Gooch OLB; 53 Shelton Quarles OLB; 51 Al Singleton OLB; 52 Nate Webster MLB; Defensive backs: 21 Donnie Abraham CB; 20 Ronde Barber CB; 46 David Gibson SS; 38 John Howell FS; 25 Brian Kelly CB; 34 Dexter Jackson FS; 47 John Lynch SS; 26 Dwight Smith CB/KR; Special teams: 4 Doug Brien K; 7 Martín Gramática K; 84 Sean McDermott LS; 3 Mark Royals P	Reserve lists: 48 Charles Kirby FB (IR); 66 Kendell Mack T (IR); 15 Frank Rice WR (IR); 33 Eric Vance S (IR); Practice squad: 82 Darryl Daniel WR; 72 Brian Gruber T; 35 Corey Ivy CB; 42 Maugaula Tuitele LB; 93 Ron Warner DE; rookies in italics 53 active, 4 inactive, 5 practice squad

== Preseason ==
=== Schedule ===
Week	Date	Opponent	Result	Record	Venue	Recap
1	August 13	Miami Dolphins	L 14–17	0–1	Raymond James Stadium	Recap
2	August 18	at Cleveland Browns	L 6–7	0–2	Cleveland Browns Stadium	Recap
3	August 25	New England Patriots	W 20–3	1–2	Raymond James Stadium	Recap
4	August 31	at Atlanta Falcons	L 7–36	1–3	Georgia Dome	Recap

== Regular season ==
=== Schedule ===
Week	Date	Opponent	Result	Record	Venue	Recap
1	September 9	at Dallas Cowboys	W 10–6	1–0	Texas Stadium	Recap
2 (Note: The Buccaneers were originally scheduled to host the Philadelphia Eagles during Week 2 of the original NFL schedule (September 16) at Raymond James Stadium. However, due to the September 11 attacks, the game was rescheduled to Week 17.)	Bye					
3	September 30	at Minnesota Vikings	L 16–20	1–1	Hubert H. Humphrey Metrodome	Recap
4	October 7	Green Bay Packers	W 14–10	2–1	Raymond James Stadium	Recap
5	October 14	at Tennessee Titans	L 28–31 (OT)	2–2	Adelphia Coliseum	Recap
6	October 21	Pittsburgh Steelers	L 10–17	2–3	Raymond James Stadium	Recap
7	October 28	Minnesota Vikings	W 41–14	3–3	Raymond James Stadium	Recap
8	November 4	at Green Bay Packers	L 20–21	3–4	Lambeau Field	Recap
9	November 11	at Detroit Lions	W 20–17	4–4	Pontiac Silverdome	Recap
10	November 18	Chicago Bears	L 24–27	4–5	Raymond James Stadium	Recap
11	November 26	at St. Louis Rams	W 24–17	5–5	Trans World Dome	Recap
12	December 2	at Cincinnati Bengals	W 16–13 (OT)	6–5	Paul Brown Stadium	Recap
13	December 9	Detroit Lions	W 15–12	7–5	Raymond James Stadium	Recap
14	December 16	at Chicago Bears	L 3–27	7–6	Soldier Field	Recap
15	December 23	New Orleans Saints	W 48–21	8–6	Raymond James Stadium	Recap
16	December 29	Baltimore Ravens	W 22–10	9–6	Raymond James Stadium	Recap
17	January 6	Philadelphia Eagles	L 13–17	9–7	Raymond James Stadium	Recap

=== Standings ===
NFC Central
	W	L	T	PCT	PF	PA	STK
^{(2)} Chicago Bears	13	3	0	.813	338	203	W4
^{(4)} Green Bay Packers	12	4	0	.750	390	266	W3
^{(6)} Tampa Bay Buccaneers	9	7	0	.563	324	280	L1
Minnesota Vikings	5	11	0	.313	290	390	L4
Detroit Lions	2	14	0	.125	270	424	W1

== Postseason ==
=== NFC Wild Card: at Philadelphia Eagles (lost 9–31) ===
	1	2	3	4	Total
Buccaneers	3	6	0	0	9
Eagles	3	14	7	7	31

at Veterans Stadium, Philadelphia

- Game time: Saturday January 12, 2002, 4:30 p.m. EST
- Game weather: 46 °F (8 °C), clear
- TV announcers (ABC): Mike Patrick (play-by-play), Joe Theismann and Paul Maguire (color commentators)
- Referee: Larry Nemmers
- Game attendance: 65,846

Eagles QB Donovan McNabb threw for 194 yards and 2 touchdowns, while also rushing for 54 yards, as Philadelphia dominated Tampa Bay from start to finish. Bucs quarterback Brad Johnson was intercepted four times, twice by Damon Moore. It was the second consecutive season in which Philadelphia eliminated Tampa Bay from the playoffs during the wild card round, and two days later, Buccaneers coach Tony Dungy was fired.

On the Eagles first drive of the game, Buccaneers safety Dexter Jackson intercepted a pass from McNabb and returned it 9 yards to the Eagles 36-yard line, setting up a 36-yard field goal from Martin Gramatica. But McNabb made up for his mistake with a 39-yard run on third down and 5 on Philadelphia's ensuing possession, setting up a field goal for David Akers that tied the game, 3–3. In the second period, McNabb completed 4 of 4 passes for 70 yards on a 73-yard drive, including a 41-yard completion to Todd Pinkston, that ended with a 16-yard touchdown pass to tight end Chad Lewis. Tampa responded with a 10-play, 65-yard drive, but once again could not dent the end zone and had to settle for another Gramatica field goal, cutting their deficit to 10–6. Later in the quarter, Eagles punter Sean Landeta pinned the Buccaneers back at their own 5-yard line and Tampa Bay could not get a first down with their next drive. After receiving Mark Royals' short 28-yard punt at the Buccaneers 31-yard line, McNabb threw a 23-yard touchdown pass to Duce Staley with 35 seconds left in the half. But Tampa Bay managed to respond with Gramatica's third field goal before halftime, set up by a 46-yard reception from Keyshawn Johnson, cutting their deficit to 17–9.

But Tampa Bay was completely dominated in the second half. Moore recorded his first interception from Brad Johnson at the Eagles 38-yard line on the Buccaneers opening drive of the third quarter. Later on, the Eagles drove 60 yards in six plays and scored on a 25-yard touchdown run from rookie Correll Buckhalter. Johnson tried to rally his team back with a pair of drives deep into Eagles territory, but both of them were ended with interceptions. First, defensive back Troy Vincent picked off a pass from Johnson in the end zone with 4:09 left in the third quarter. Then late in the fourth quarter, safety Brian Dawkins intercepted Johnson on Philadelphia's 3-yard line. Following a punt, Moore put the game away by recording his second interception and returning it 59 yards for a touchdown.

- Scoring
  - TB – field goal Gramatica 36 TB 3–0
  - PHI – field goal Akers 26 Tie 3–3
  - PHI – Lewis 16 pass from McNabb (Akers kick) PHI 10–3
  - TB – field goal Gramatica 32 PHI 10–6
  - PHI – Staley 23 pass from McNabb (Akers kick) PHI 17–6
  - TB – field goal Gramatica 27 PHI 17–9
  - PHI – Buckhalter 25 run (Akers kick) PHI 24–9
  - PHI – Moore 59 interception return (Akers kick) PHI 31–9

== Game summaries ==
=== Preseason (1–3) ===
The Ryan Leaf experiment ended about as fast as it started. Tampa Bay signed the troubled quarterback during the offseason. The Buccaneers were intrigued by his physical talent and planned to develop his abilities more slowly by having him watch and learn. However, Leaf's wrist still had not healed, and he refused to have surgery despite doctors' strong recommendations. After mediocre performances in the Buccaneers' four preseason games, the club asked Leaf to accept a lower salary. He refused, and the club released him just five days before the start of the 2001 season.

=== Week 1: at Dallas Cowboys (won 10–6) ===
Brad Johnson started his first game for the Buccaneers, and led them to a 10–6 victory. Despite holding a poor Cowboys club to only 127 yards, a fourth-quarter touchdown run by Johnson was needed to seal the victory. It was the Bucs' first ever victory in Dallas.

=== Week 2: Philadelphia Eagles ===
Initially the game was a highly anticipated rematch from last season's wild card round. However, after 9/11, all week 2 games were postponed and eventually rescheduled to become week 18.

=== Week 3: Bye ===
The NFL resumed play in week 3, but Tampa Bay was scheduled for their bye week.

=== Week 4: at Minnesota Vikings (lost 16–20) ===
After 21 days, the Buccaneers finally played their second game of the season. Three Martin Gramatica field goals and a Warrick Dunn touchdown run gave the Buccaneers a 16–13 lead in the fourth quarter. However, Vikings quarterback Daunte Culpepper capped off a 96-yard drive with an 8-yard touchdown run with 1:03 remaining, and Minnesota took the victory 20–16.

=== Week 5: Green Bay Packers (won 14–10) ===
Tampa Bay finally played their first home game, five weeks into the season. Shelton Quarles intercepted Brett Favre and returned the ball 98 yards for a touchdown, the longest such in franchise history. The Buccaneers intercepted Favre a total of three times, and Mike Alstott clinched the victory with a 39-yard touchdown run late in the fourth quarter.

=== Week 6: at Tennessee Titans (lost 28–31, OT) ===
Brad Johnson passed for 287 yards and three touchdown passes (including two in the final 6 minutes) and forced overtime. However, the Titans kicked a field goal and won the game on their first possession of overtime.

=== Week 7: Pittsburgh Steelers (lost 10–17) ===
The Steelers sacked Brad Johnson ten times, and Jerome Bettis rushed for 143 yards, as the Buccaneers fell to 2–3 on the season. After trailing 17–3, Tampa Bay finally got into the endzone with 28 seconds to go, but the result was not as close as the score indicated.

=== Week 8: Minnesota Vikings (won 41–14) ===
After slumping for several weeks, the Buccaneers rolled over their division rivals, the Minnesota Vikings. Mike Alstott rushed for 129 yards, and three touchdowns, while Brad Johnson threw two touchdown passes and no interceptions. Due to the NFL's realignment for the 2002 season, this was the Buccaneers final game against the Vikings as division rivals.

=== Week 9: at Green Bay Packers (lost 20–21) ===
Tampa Bay looked to break a winless streak against Green Bay at Lambeau Field that dated back to 1989. Brad Johnson connected on two touchdown passes, and Martin Gramatica scored two field goals for a 20–14 lead late in the fourth quarter. The Buccaneer defense also performed, intercepting Brett Favre twice. With 3:03 to go, however, Allen Rossum scored a game-winning 55-yard punt return touchdown to foil the Buccaneers' chances at victory. This was the Buccaneers final game against the Packers as division rivals, and their last trip to Lambeau Field until 2005.

=== Week 10: at Detroit Lions (won 20–17) ===
Tampa Bay traveled to the Silverdome for the final time to take on a pitiful 0–9 Lions team. With 4 seconds to go, Martin Gramatica scored a 35-yard field goal to pull out the victory, and avoid the upset. Tampa Bay improved to 4–4.

=== Week 11: Chicago Bears (lost 24–27) ===
Tampa Bay trailed 24–16 entering the fourth quarter, but Brad Johnson rallied the Buccaneers to a 3-point deficit. As time expired, Martin Gramatica attempted a 48-yard game-tying field goal to force overtime. The ball hit the upright and fell no good, and Chicago held on for a 27–24 win.

=== Week 12: St. Louis Rams (won 24–17) ===
Tampa Bay traveled to St. Louis on Monday night. It was the second rematch of the 1999 NFC Championship, and the latest installment of an increasingly popular rivalry between the Buccaneers and Rams. The game went back and forth, and was tied 17–17 after three quarters. Warrick Dunn scored a 21-yard touchdown run in the fourth quarter, which proved to be the winning margin.

With a touchdown run in the second half, Mike Alstott became the franchise's all-time leader in total touchdowns. It was a distinction he would hold until 2021.

=== Week 13: at Cincinnati Bengals (won 16–13, OT) ===
Following the short week, Tampa Bay traveled to Cincinnati to take on the less-than-mediocre Cincinnati Bengals. Despite the poor opposition, Tampa Bay's only touchdown came from a blocked punt. Martin Gramatica scored two field goals, and the Buccaneers held a 13–6 lead, With 8 seconds left in regulation, Jon Kitna connected with Corey Dillon for a game-tying 6-yard touchdown pass, and forced overtime.

In the overtime period, Tampa Bay won the toss and received. They drove to the Cincinnati 30 yard line, but a sack on third down pushed them back to the 38, and out of field goal range. Punter Mark Royals pinned the Bengals back at their own 4-yard line. On the first play of the Bengals drive, Dillon fumbled the ball, and it was recovered by John Lynch at the 3-yard line. Without hesitation, Gramatica came out on to the field, and kicked a chip-shot 21-yard field goal to win the game.

=== Week 14: Detroit Lions (won 15–12) ===
The Lions came into the game 0–11 and were led by rookie quarterback Mike McMahon. The Lions never managed to reach the endzone, however, Tampa Bay's offense struggled all day and found themselves trailing 12–7. With just over a minute to go, the Buccaneers faced 4th & 8 at the Detroit 28-yard line. Brad Johnson completed a 15-yard pass to Keyshawn Johnson to keep the drive alive. With 45 seconds to go, the Johnson and Johnson duo connected again, this time for a game-winning touchdown pass. This was the Buccaneers final game against the Lions as division rivals.

=== Week 15: at Chicago Bears (lost 3–27) ===
Tampa Bay gave up 27 unanswered points, and was swept by the Bears. This was the Buccaneers final game against an NFC Central team and the last against the Bears as division rivals.

=== Week 16: New Orleans Saints (won 48–21) ===
After hitting their low point the previous week, Tampa Bay rebounded during Christmas week with a record-setting performance against the visiting Saints who would become their future rival in the new NFC South division the following year in wake of the league realignment. Aaron Stecker took back the opening kickoff a then-franchise record 86 yards, but failed to make the endzone, continuing the Buccaneers' then-streak of never having a kickoff returned for a touchdown. Though he was tackled, the long return was not for naught, as two plays later, Brad Johnson connected with Karl Williams for a 14-yard touchdown, and a lead the Buccaneers never surrendered.

In the first half, Williams, Mike Alstott and Warrick Dunn each scored touchdowns, while Martin Gramatica added three field goals. The Buccaneers took a 30–0 lead into halftime. The scoring continued into the second half, and the Saints finally got onto the board. With 2 minutes remaining in the game, Ronde Barber intercepted Aaron Brooks pass, and returned it 36 yards for an "icing-on-the-cake" touchdown. Adding a little insult to injury, back-up quarterback Shaun King attempted a two-point conversion, and with its success, the Buccaneers tied the franchise record for most points in a game at 48.

The win improved Tampa Bay's record to 8–6, and put them in control of a wild card spot. One win in the final two games (coupled with an Atlanta loss) would send the Buccaneers to the playoffs.

=== Week 17: Baltimore Ravens (won 22–10) ===
Though it was part of the Monday Night Football schedule, the game was held on a Saturday night due to New Year's Eve. The Tampa Bay defense intercepted Elvis Grbac twice, and held the Ravens to under 100 yards rushing. The victory game Tampa Bay their third consecutive win against a defending Super Bowl champion: (Broncos- XXXIII, Rams- XXXIV, Ravens- XXXV)

=== Week 18: Philadelphia Eagles (lost 13–17) ===
Originally this game was to be played back in Week 2 and was thought to be a highly anticipated rematch from last season's wild card round. But due to 9/11, the game was rescheduled for Week 18. Midway through the season, it was believed that game might have playoff implications on the line, so the game was moved to Sunday Night Football. On game day, however, both teams found themselves locked into their respective playoff seeds. Regardless of the outcome of this game, Tampa Bay would be the #6 seed in the NFC, and Philadelphia would be the #3 seed. They would meet six days later at Veterans Stadium in the wild card round. Therefore, both teams rested many of their starters, and the game was considered largely inconsequential and lost a lot of its luster.

With several players inactive, such as Keyshawn Johnson, Warrick Dunn, Martin Gramatica, and with quarterback Brad Johnson playing only in the first drive, the offense sputtered. Tampa Bay held a 13–3 lead deep into the fourth quarter. With 2:19 to go, Eagles back-up quarterback A. J. Feeley connected with Dameane Douglas for their first touchdown, and narrowed the lead to 13–10. On the ensuing kickoff, Karl "The Truth" Williams fumbled the return at the Tampa Bay 24-yard line, and it was recovered by Philadelphia. Two plays later, Feeley and Douglas took the lead with their second touchdown. Philadelphia managed to score 14 points in 25 seconds, and held on to win the unusual, rather lackadaisical game.
