= 2000 Tampa Bay Buccaneers season =

NFL team season

- Owner: Malcolm Glazer
- General manager: Rich McKay
- Head coach: Tony Dungy
- Offensive coordinator: Les Steckel
- Defensive coordinator: Monte Kiffin
- Home stadium: Raymond James Stadium

Results
- Record: 10–6
- Division place: 2nd NFC Central
- Playoffs: Lost Wild Card Playoffs (at Eagles) 3–21
- All-Pros: 4: LB Derrick Brooks; SS John Lynch; DT Warren Sapp; K Martin Gramatica
- Pro Bowlers: 9: CB Donnie Abraham; FB Mike Alstott; LB Derrick Brooks; C Jeff Christy; HB Warrick Dunn; K Martin Gramatica; SS John Lynch; G Randall McDaniel; DT Warren Sapp
- Team MVP: LB Derrick Brooks

The 2000 Tampa Bay Buccaneers season was the franchise's 25th season in the National Football League (NFL).

The season began with the team trying to improve on an 11–5 season from 1999. Shaun King, who took over the quarterback position as a rookie midway through the 1999 season, became the full-time starter for 2000. In April, the Buccaneers acquired wide receiver Keyshawn Johnson via a trade from the New York Jets. It was a highly publicized transaction, which made Johnson the highest-paid wide receiver in the NFL, and increased expectations for the club.

The team jumped out of the gate with convincing wins to start 3–0. But they stumbled over the next several weeks and slipped to 3–4. In week 9, Tampa Bay beat the then-undefeated Minnesota Vikings with an explosive game which turned the season in the right direction. They won seven out of their next eight games, and looked poised to return to the playoffs for the third time in four seasons. In Week 16, the Buccaneers won one of the more notable games in the history of Monday Night Football against the St. Louis Rams. It was a rematch of the previous season's NFC Championship Game. However, instead of the defensive struggle of the previous meeting, it was a 38–35 shootout with the Buccaneers prevailing and clinching a wild card spot.

In the final week of the regular season, the Buccaneers faced the Green Bay Packers, with the NFC Central title on the line. With a victory at Lambeau Field, the Buccaneers were poised to win the division, and secure a first round bye for the playoffs. After a rally to tie the game in the fourth quarter, kicker Martin Gramatica missed a game-winning field goal attempt at the end of regulation. The Buccaneers lost the game in overtime, and failed to win the division. The dejected club fell to the #5 seed, and was routed by the Philadelphia Eagles in the Wild Card Game, 21–3.

== Offseason ==
Additions	Subtractions
WR Keyshawn Johnson (Jets)	QB Trent Dilfer (Ravens)
G Randall McDaniel (Vikings)	TE John Davis (Vikings)
C Jeff Christy (Vikings)	T Paul Gruber (retirement)
	DT Brad Culpepper (Bears)
	WR Bert Emanuel (Dolphins)
	LB Hardy Nickerson (Jaguars)

=== NFL draft ===
2000 Tampa Bay Buccaneers draft
Round	Pick	Player	Position	College	Notes
2	51	Cosey Coleman	Guard	Tennessee	
3	90	Nate Webster	Linebacker	Miami	
5	157	James Whalen	Tight end	Kentucky	
6	193	David Gibson	Safety	USC	
7	234	Joe Hamilton	Quarterback	Georgia Tech	
Made roster * Made at least one Pro Bowl during career

=== Undrafted free agents ===
2000 undrafted free agents of note
Player	Position	College
John Blick	Tackle	Penn State
Chris Daniels	Wide receiver	Purdue
Drew O'Conner	Wide receiver	Maine
Jeff Popovich	Safety	Miami (FL)
Mawuko Tugbenyoh	Linebacker	California
Todd Yoder	Tight End	Vanderbilt

== Personnel ==
=== Staff / Coaches ===
2000 Tampa Bay Buccaneers staff
Front office: Owner/President – Malcolm Glazer; General manager – Rich McKay; Head coaches: Head coach – Tony Dungy; Assistant head coach/defensive backs – Herman Edwards; Offensive coaches: Offensive coordinator – Les Steckel; Quarterbacks – Clyde Christensen; Running backs – Tony Nathan; Wide receivers – Charlie Williams; Tight ends – Ricky Thomas; Offensive line – Chris Foerster; Offensive assistant – Wendell Avery	Defensive coaches: Defensive coordinator – Monte Kiffin; Defensive line – Rod Marinelli; Linebackers – Lovie Smith; Defensive assistant – Kevin O'Dea; Special teams coaches: Special teams – Joe Marciano; Strength and conditioning: Strength and conditioning – Mark Asanovich; Assistant strength and conditioning – Les Ebert

=== Final roster ===
2000 Tampa Bay Buccaneers final roster
Quarterbacks: 14 Joe Hamilton; 10 Shaun King; 15 Eric Zeier; Running backs: 27 Rabih Abdullah; 40 Mike Alstott FB; 28 Warrick Dunn; 48 Charles Kirby FB; 22 Aaron Stecker KR; Wide receivers: 85 Reidel Anthony; 81 Jacquez Green; 19 Keyshawn Johnson; 87 Frank Murphy; 86 Karl Williams KR/PR; Tight ends: 82 Patrick Hape; 83 Dave Moore; 80 Todd Yoder	Offensive linemen: 62 Jeff Christy C; 60 Cosey Coleman G; 76 DeMarcus Curry T; 65 Kevin Dogins C/G; 79 George Hegamin T; 64 Randall McDaniel G; 73 Frank Middleton G; 69 Pete Pierson T; 75 Todd Washington C/G; 71 Jerry Wunsch T; Defensive linemen: 72 Chidi Ahanotu DE; 98 James Cannida DT; 97 Tyoka Jackson DT; 78 Marcus Jones DE; 92 Anthony McFarland DT; 95 John McLaughlin DE; 99 Warren Sapp DT; 94 Steve White DE	Linebackers: 55 Derrick Brooks OLB; 58 Don Davis OLB; 59 Jamie Duncan MLB; 50 Jeff Gooch OLB; 53 Shelton Quarles OLB; 51 Al Singleton OLB; 52 Nate Webster MLB; Defensive backs: 21 Donnie Abraham CB; 20 Ronde Barber CB; 46 David Gibson SS; 34 Dexter Jackson FS; 25 Brian Kelly CB; 47 John Lynch SS; 24 Damien Robinson FS; 33 Eric Vance SS; 31 Floyd Young CB; Special teams: 7 Martín Gramática K; 3 Mark Royals P; 68 Morris Unutoa LS	Reserve lists: 16 Chris Daniels WR (IR); 70 Jason Odom T (IR); 84 Blake Spence TE (IR); Practice squad: 91 Chuck Darby DT; 30 Anthony Midget CB; 88 Yo Murphy WR; 49 Randy Palmer TE; -- Ted White QB; rookies in italics 53 active, 3 inactive, 5 practice squad

== Regular season ==
=== Schedule ===
Week	Date	Opponent	Result	Record	Venue	Attendance
1	September 3	at New England Patriots	W 21–16	1-0	Foxboro Stadium	60,292
2	September 10	Chicago Bears	W 41–0	2-0	Raymond James Stadium	65,569
3	September 17	at Detroit Lions	W 31–10	3-0	Pontiac Silverdome	76,928
4	September 24	New York Jets	L 17–21	3-1	Raymond James Stadium	65,619
5	October 1	at Washington Redskins	L 17–20 (OT)	3-2	FedExField	83,532
6	October 9	at Minnesota Vikings	L 23–30	3-3	Hubert H. Humphrey Metrodome	64,162
7	Bye					
8	October 19	Detroit Lions	L 14–28	3-4	Raymond James Stadium	65,557
9	October 29	Minnesota Vikings	W 41–13	4-4	Raymond James Stadium	65,589
10	November 5	at Atlanta Falcons	W 27–14	5-4	Georgia Dome	70,097
11	November 12	Green Bay Packers	W 20–15	6-4	Raymond James Stadium	65,621
12	November 19	at Chicago Bears	L 10–13	6-5	Soldier Field	66,944
13	November 26	Buffalo Bills	W 31–17	7-5	Raymond James Stadium	65,546
14	December 3	Dallas Cowboys	W 27–7	8-5	Raymond James Stadium	65,621
15	December 10	at Miami Dolphins	W 16–13	9-5	Pro Player Stadium	74,307
16	December 18	St. Louis Rams	W 38–35	10-5	Raymond James Stadium	65,653
17	December 24	at Green Bay Packers	L 14–17 (OT)	10-6	Lambeau Field	59,692

=== Standings ===
NFC Central
	W	L	T	PCT	PF	PA	STK
^{(2)} Minnesota Vikings	11	5	0	.688	397	371	L3
^{(5)} Tampa Bay Buccaneers	10	6	0	.625	388	269	L1
Green Bay Packers	9	7	0	.563	353	323	W4
Detroit Lions	9	7	0	.563	307	307	L1
Chicago Bears	5	11	0	.313	216	355	W1

== Playoffs ==
=== NFC Wild Card: at Philadelphia Eagles ===
	1	2	3	4	Total
Buccaneers	0	3	0	0	3
Eagles	0	14	0	7	21

at Veterans Stadium, Philadelphia

- Game time: 4:00 p.m. EST
- Game weather: 35 °F (2 °C) (Cloudy)
- TV announcers (FOX): Pat Summerall and John Madden
- Referee: Mike Carey
- Game Attendance: 65,813

Tampa Bay could not recover from their devastating loss the week prior as the Eagles defense held Tampa Bay to only 199 total yards and 11 first downs. The Buccaneers scored first early in the second quarter with Martin Gramatica's 29-yard field goal. But late in the period, the Eagles' Hugh Douglas forced Tampa Bay quarterback Shaun King to fumble, and Mike Mamula recovered the loose ball at the Buccaneers 15-yard line. The turnover set up Philadelphia quarterback Donovan McNabb's 5-yard touchdown run. Tampa Bay then punted on their next possession and the Eagles marched 69 yards on 8 plays to take a 14–3 lead on Na Brown's 5-yard touchdown reception with 12 seconds left in the half. Philadelphia then shut out the Buccaneers in the second half, while McNabb threw a 2-yard pass to Jeff Thomason with less than a minute left in the game to seal the victory. The Eagles' victory meant for the 35th consecutive year that the team hosting the Super Bowl would not be playing in it.

- Scoring
  - TB – FG Gramatica 29 TB 3–0
  - PHI – McNabb 5 run (Akers kick) PHI 7–3
  - PHI – Brown 5 pass from McNabb (Akers kick) PHI 14–3
  - PHI – Thomason 2 pass from McNabb (Akers kick) PHI 21–3

== Game summaries ==
=== Week 1 at New England Patriots ===
	1	2	3	4	Total
Buccaneers	0	14	7	0	21
Patriots	3	7	0	6	16

With time running out before halftime, Shaun King drove the Buccaneers to the New England 8-yard line. Faking a spike play (the Dan Marino "Clock Play"), King lofted a pass to Reidel Anthony scoring a surprise 8-yard touchdown pass. The Tampa Bay defense sacked Drew Bledsoe six times, and recovered a fumble to hold a 21–16 lead late in the game. With 14 seconds remaining, at their own 22-yard line, the defense forced four straight incompletions, and held on for the victory.

=== Week 2 vs Chicago Bears ===
	1	2	3	4	Total
Bears	0	0	0	0	0
Buccaneers	0	20	14	7	41

Tampa Bay crushed the visiting Bears 41–0, setting a franchise record for a shutout. After a scoreless first quarter, the Buccaneers scored 20 points in the second quarter. Shaun King finished the day with two touchdown passes and one touchdown run. The Buccaneers won their home opener, and started the season 2–0.

=== Week 3 at Detroit Lions ===
	1	2	3	4	Total
Buccaneers	14	7	3	7	31
Lions	3	7	0	0	10

Shaun King passed for 211 yards, one touchdown pass, and had a 6-yard touchdown run, as Tampa Bay beat Detroit at the Silverdome. The Buccaneers defense held the Lions to only 17 yards rushing, and made two interceptions.

=== Week 4 vs New York Jets ===
	1	2	3	4	Total
Jets	3	3	0	15	21
Buccaneers	3	7	7	0	17

Tampa Bay entered Week Four undefeated at 3–0. Wide receiver Keyshawn Johnson had been traded to the Buccaneers over the offseason, and for the first time, would meet his former club, the New York Jets. Johnson was outspoken in the days leading up to the game, publicly ripping former teammate Wayne Chrebet by contrasting himself as "a star while [Chrebet] is a flashlight."

In the rain, quarterback Shaun King struggled, but led the Buccaneers to a 10–6 lead at halftime. In the first quarter, King went long for Jacquez Green, who caught it as two Jets defenders misplayed the ball, and went down the sideline for what appeared to be an 86-yard touchdown. But Green was ruled out-of-bounds at the 11 and Tampa Bay settled for a field goal. The first touchdown of the game came on a sensational one-handed catch by tight end Dave Moore. Near the end of the first half, King threw his first interception of the season in Bucs territory. But two plays later, Jets quarterback Vinny Testaverde threw an interception of his own, and King's turnover did not lead to points for the Jets.

In the third quarter, Ronde Barber returned a Testaverde interception 37 yards for a touchdown to extend the lead to 17–6. It looked like Tampa Bay would hold on as linebacker Jamie Duncan intercepted another pass from Testaverde in the fourth quarter. It was Testaverde's third interception of the game. Testaverde played so poorly that he was benched for one drive and replaced with Ray Lucas, but after he too failed to generate much offense, Testaverde was given one more chance with 5:01 to go. Finally he stepped up, leading the Jets inside the 10. With two minutes to go, Testaverde scored a 6-yard touchdown pass to Curtis Martin. Martin followed with a two-point conversion run to narrow the score to 17–14. On the ensuing drive, Buccaneers fullback Mike Alstott lost a fumble, and it was recovered by the Jets. With 52 seconds remaining, Jets offensive coordinator Dan Henning called for a halfback option pass. Testaverde flipped the ball to Martin, who then executed a halfback option pass to Wayne Chrebet to score an improbable game-winning touchdown, and a 21–17 final score.

After considerable media attention going into the game, Keyshawn Johnson was held to one catch for 1 yard, which came on a shovel pass. In light of the attention that was placed on the matchup, and the embarrassing last-minute loss, the game eventually became known as the "Keyshawn Bowl."

=== Week 5 at Washington Redskins ===
	1	2	3	4	OT	Total
Buccaneers	7	0	0	10	0	17
Redskins	0	7	3	7	3	20

With just under 4 minutes to go in the fourth quarter, Washington went up by a score of 17–7. With 3:36 to go, Shaun King faced 3rd & 10 at the Washington 46. King was stripped of the ball, and fumbled. He recovered the ball, picked it up, and threw an improbable 46-yard touchdown pass to Reidel Anthony. With 43 seconds remaining, the Buccaneers blocked a field goal by the Redskins, and recovered the ball at the 25. Martin Gramatica kicked a game-tying 42-yard field goal as time expired in regulation, and sent the game to overtime. In the overtime period, Deion Sanders returned a Tampa Bay punt 57 yards, setting the Redskins up for a game winning 20-yard field goal.

=== Week 6 at Minnesota Vikings ===
	1	2	3	4	Total
Buccaneers	7	3	6	7	23
Vikings	7	10	3	10	30

Tampa Bay fell to their division rival Minnesota on Monday Night Football. With 12 minutes left in the fourth quarter, the Buccaneers blocked a field goal attempt. Donnie Abraham returned the ball 53-yards for a touchdown, and a 23–20 lead.

Trailing 27–23 with just under 9 minutes left, Shaun King drove the Buccaneers to the Minnesota 47-yard line. On 4th down & 1, a trick play saw Mike Alstott loft a pass to Todd Yoder, but it fell incomplete. Tampa Bay lost by a score of 30–23, and dropped their third straight game, falling to 3–3.

=== Week 8 vs Detroit Lions ===
	1	2	3	4	Total
Lions	0	11	3	14	28
Buccaneers	6	5	0	3	14

Tampa Bay hosted Detroit on a Thursday night game. A 9–0 lead was fizzled away as Lions running back James Stewart rushed for 116 yards, three touchdowns, and a two-point conversion. Shaun King threw three interceptions in the second half, and Tampa Bay fell to 3–4.

=== Week 9 vs Minnesota Vikings ===
	1	2	3	4	Total
Vikings	3	10	0	0	13
Buccaneers	14	17	3	7	41

Tampa Bay snapped a four-game losing streak by beating their division rivals the Minnesota Vikings in their second meeting of the season. Shaun King threw for 267 yards, four touchdowns, and no interceptions. Derrick Brooks added a 34-yard interception return. With the victory, Tampa Bay stopped the Vikings then-undefeated season for the second time in three years.

=== Week 10 at Atlanta Falcons ===
	1	2	3	4	Total
Buccaneers	7	7	3	10	27
Falcons	0	0	7	7	14

Keyshawn Johnson scored two touchdown catches as Tampa Bay beat Atlanta at the Georgia Dome. The Buccaneers held a 27–7 lead until a "garbage time" touchdown with 3 seconds to go trimmed the margin slightly.

=== Week 11 vs Green Bay Packers ===
	1	2	3	4	Total
Packers	0	3	6	6	15
Buccaneers	0	14	0	6	20

Tampa Bay pulled out to a 14–3 halftime lead against Green Bay. In the third quarter, Warren Sapp sacked Brett Favre, and knocked him out of the game with a sprained foot. Martin Gramatica saved the game for the Buccaneers, connecting on two long field goals (54, 51 yards) in the fourth quarter.

=== Week 12 at Chicago Bears ===
	1	2	3	4	Total
Buccaneers	0	3	7	0	10
Bears	3	7	0	3	13

Quarterback Shaun King threw two interceptions (one returned for a touchdown), and gained only 91 yards of passing, as the Buccaneers fell to the division rival Bears.

=== Week 13 vs Buffalo Bills ===
	1	2	3	4	Total
Bills	0	7	0	10	17
Buccaneers	3	7	0	21	31

Tampa Bay gained less than 200 yards of offense and allowed 7 sacks, but so-called "Buc Ball" still prevailed over the visiting Bills. Warrick Dunn scored two rushing touchdowns, Karl "The Truth" Williams scored a 73-yard punt return touchdown, and Derrick Brooks had an outstanding day with 20 tackles.

The game proved more competitive than the final score indicated. The score was 10–7 at the end of three quarters. Dunn's first touchdown made the score 17–7, when the Bills responded when future Bucs backup QB Rob Johnson threw a touchdown to Eric Moulds. Williams's punt return made the score 24-14 late. On the ensuing possession for the Bills, Brooks wrapped up Johnson and violently threw him to the ground with a hit that knocked him out of the game, but miraculously, Johnson flipped the ball to Shawn Bryson and a sure sack became a 15-yard gain to set up a field goal to make it 24–17 with about 2:30 to go. The Bills attempted an onside kick, but the Bucs recovered. Dunn's game clinching touchdown run came two plays later.

=== Week 14 vs Dallas Cowboys ===
	1	2	3	4	Total
Cowboys	0	0	7	0	7
Buccaneers	17	3	0	7	27

Tampa Bay scored 17 points in the first quarter, and dominated the visiting Cowboys. Running back Warrick Dunn finished with two touchdowns and 210 rushing yards, just 9 short of the team single-game record. Dunn's 76-yard touchdown run in the first quarter was a franchise record at the time.

=== Week 15 at Miami Dolphins ===
	1	2	3	4	Total
Buccaneers	0	10	0	6	16
Dolphins	3	0	10	0	13

Tampa Bay traveled to take on their in-state rivals, the Miami Dolphins. The game was important for both teams, as the Dolphins would clinch an AFC playoff berth with a win, and the Buccaneers needed to win to maintain their berth in the NFC wild card hunt. Steady rain made for sloppy conditions, but the Buccaneer defense dominated the game. Tampa Bay intercepted Jay Fiedler four times, and forced a fumble midway through the fourth quarter. With just over 8 minutes remaining, Martin Gramatica made a 46-yard field goal in the pouring rain, and the Buccaneers held on to win.

With less than three minutes to play, the Dolphins, trailing by 3, entered Buccaneers territory but were unable to advance the ball any further. A Matt Turk punt pinned the Buccaneers at their own 2 yard line. Facing 3rd down & 7 at the 5 yard line, Shaun King threw a screen pass to Warrick Dunn from the end zone. The Dolphins defense nearly tackled him at the goal line, but Dunn broke free and got back to the line of scrimmage, avoiding a safety. On the next play, Mark Royals boomed a 54-yard punt, and good coverage kept the Dolphins starting at midfield rather than needing a single first down to get into field goal range with 2:08 left. A pass interference call against Brian Kelly put the ball at the 24 yard line and in kicker Olindo Mare's range when Fiedler made the worst play of the day. Fiedler dropped back and threw the ball away while he was still in the tackle box, resulting in an intentional grounding penalty. The penalty pushed the Dolphins only to the brink of Mare's range, and on the next play, Fiedler threw his fourth interception.

=== Week 16 vs St. Louis Rams ===
	1	2	3	4	Total
Rams	7	7	7	14	35
Buccaneers	10	14	7	7	38

The Buccaneers hosted the St. Louis Rams in one of the most memorable Monday Night Football games in history. It was a rematch of the previous season's NFC Championship (which was won by the Rams).

With 5:18 to go, Kurt Warner connected with a 72-yard touchdown pass to Torry Holt to take a 35–31 lead. Tampa Bay, with no timeouts remaining, started their next drive at their own 20-yard line, with a playoff berth on the line for both teams. Quarterback Shaun King led the team on a remarkable 80-yard drive to win 38–35. The drive included a swing pass play from King to Warrick Dunn, which lost 14 yards, but Dunn pitched the ball backwards back to King, who scrambled 29 yards for a first down.

The win secured, at minimum, a wild card playoff spot for Tampa Bay, and is regarded as one of the greatest regular season games in Buccaneer history.

=== Week 17 at Green Bay Packers ===
	1	2	3	4	OT	Total
Buccaneers	0	0	3	11	0	14
Packers	7	0	7	0	3	17

On Christmas Eve, Tampa Bay traveled to Lambeau Field to meet the division rival Green Bay Packers. A Tampa Bay win, coupled with a loss by Minnesota would clinch the NFC Central title for the Buccaneers, as well as a first-round bye in the playoffs. In addition, a win by the Buccaneers would break an 11-game losing streak at Green Bay dating back to 1989, and an 0–18 record in games under 40 °F (4 °C). Green Bay also was battling for a wild card spot, needing a win and losses by both Detroit and St. Louis to stay alive.

On a frigid, windy, snowy, 18° day, Green Bay took a 14–0 lead, while Tampa Bay's offense sputtered. Shaun King narrowed the Buccaneers to a 14–3 deficit to start the fourth quarter, but it was the Buccaneer defense which kept the team in the game. King finally got the offense going, and drove 74 yards for Tampa Bay's first touchdown. A two-point conversion try appeared to be a busted play salvaged with some trickery. King handed off to Warrick Dunn, who handed off to Mike Alstott, but pitched the ball back to King, who crossed the endzone, and made the score 14–11 with just over nine minutes remaining.

On Green Bay's next drive, John Lynch intercepted Brett Favre, and returned the ball to the Packers' 35-yard line. After going 3-and-out, coach Tony Dungy took a timeout to decide whether to go for it on 4th & 1. After consideration, Martin Gramatica was brought in for a field goal try, and the score was tied 14–14 with just under 8 minutes remaining.

Late in the fourth quarter, Favre drove the Packers into Tampa Bay territory, looking to win the game. With 1:54 to go in regulation, Favre was intercepted by Jamie Duncan at the Tampa Bay 28, and Duncan returned the ball 15 yards to the Green Bay 43. In just over a minute and a half, King drove the Buccaneers to the Green Bay 22-yard line. With 13 seconds to go, Gramatica attempted a potential game-winning 40-yard field goal, but the kick sailed wide right. The game went into overtime, and the Packers won the coin toss. On the first drive of overtime, kicker Ryan Longwell won the game for Green Bay.

The loss was devastating for Tampa Bay, especially when Minnesota lost later that afternoon. After forcing four turnovers, and battling back from a 14-point deficit, Tampa Bay's postseason outlook changed dramatically. Instead of winning their division and securing a first-round bye (and a legitimate shot at a "home game" for Super Bowl XXXV held at their very own Raymond James Stadium), the Buccaneers instead saw themselves fall to a wild card, having to play on the road at the Eagles. The loss also meant Tampa Bay fell to 0–19 in games under 40 °F (4 °C)., and their losing streak at Green Bay extended to 11 games. Afterwards, Gramatica took blame for the loss saying "It hurts because I let the guys down." Despite the win, Green Bay was eliminated from the playoffs.

== Awards and records ==
- Led NFC, Takeaways/Giveaways (+17)
- Ronde Barber, NFC Defensive Player of the Week, week 2
- Derrick Brooks, NFC Defensive Player of the Week, week 1
- Warrick Dunn, NFC Offensive Player of the Week, week 14
- Martin Gramatica, NFC Special Teams Player of the Week, week 15
- Shaun King, NFC Offensive Player of the Week, week 9
- Warren Sapp, NFC Defensive Player of the Week, week 3
- Warren Sapp, All-NFL Team (selected by Associated Press and Pro Football Weekly)
- Karl Williams, NFC Special Teams Player of the Week, week 13

=== Pro Bowl selections ===
- Donnie Abraham, Defensive Back, Reserve
- Mike Alstott, Running Back, Starter
- Derrick Brooks, Outside Linebacker, Starter
- Jeff Christy, Center, Starter
- Warrick Dunn, Running Back, Reserve
- Martin Gramatica, Kicker, Reserve
- John Lynch, Strong Safety, Starter
- Randall McDaniel, Guard, Starter
- Warren Sapp, Defensive Tackle, Starter
