= Jamie Duncan =

American football player (born 1975)

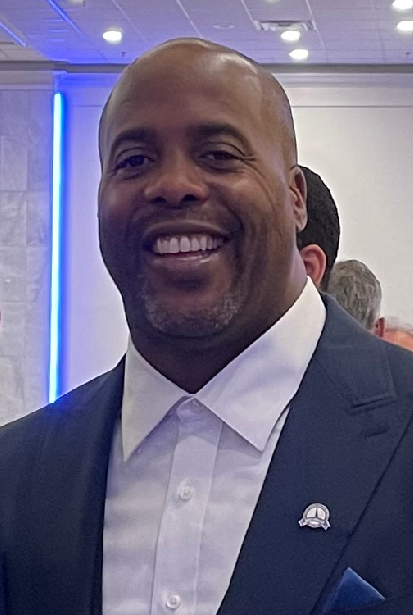
- Duncan in 2026

No. 59
- Position: Linebacker

Personal information
- Born: July 20, 1975 (age 51); Wilmington, Delaware, U.S.
- Listed height: 6 ft 1 in (1.85 m)
- Listed weight: 238 lb (108 kg)

Career information
- High school: Christiana (Newark, Delaware)
- College: Vanderbilt (1993–1997)
- NFL draft: 1998: 3rd round, 84th overall pick

Career history
- Tampa Bay Buccaneers (1998–2001); St. Louis Rams (2002–2003); Atlanta Falcons (2004)

Awards and highlights
- SEC Defensive Player of the Year (1997); First-team All-American (1997); 2× First-team All-SEC (1996, 1997); Delaware Gatorade Player of the Year (1992)

Career NFL statistics
- Tackles: 307
- Sacks: 3
- Interceptions: 6
- Stats at Pro Football Reference

Jamie Robert Duncan (born July 20, 1975) is an American former professional football player who was a linebacker for seven seasons in the National Football League (NFL). From Wilmington, Delaware, he was a top player at Christiana High School, where he was a two-time first-team All-State selection and helped Christiana to a conference championship and runner-up finish at the Division I state championship. Delaware's Gatorade Player of the Year in 1992, Duncan signed to play college football for the Vanderbilt Commodores of the Southeastern Conference (SEC).

At Vanderbilt, Duncan redshirted as a freshman in 1993 before winning a starting role at linebacker in 1994. He was one of the team's top tacklers throughout his college career and was considered their strongest player. Duncan was named first-team All-SEC as a redshirt junior in 1996 after leading the conference with 152 tackles. Then, as a senior in 1997, he captained the Commodores and was named first-team All-SEC, first-team All-American and the SEC Defensive Player of the Year.

Duncan was selected by the Tampa Bay Buccaneers in the third round of the 1998 NFL draft. He spent most of his rookie season as a backup before becoming the starting middle linebacker late in the year after an injury to Hardy Nickerson. After serving as a backup and special teams player in 1999, he became the full-time starter following Nickerson's departure in 2000, recording four interceptions that season. Duncan placed second on the team in tackles in 2001 before signing with the St. Louis Rams in 2002. He played two seasons with the Rams and one for the Atlanta Falcons before concluding his career. He entered business after his football career.

== Early life ==
Jamie Robert Duncan was born on July 20, 1975, in Wilmington, Delaware, and raised by his single mother. He began playing football in third grade and grew up playing in local leagues. Before high school, he played as a defensive end and offensive guard. Duncan attended Christiana High School where he competed in football and basketball. A tight end and linebacker at the start of his high school career, he became a starter on offense as a freshman in 1989 while also seeing some playing time as a backup on defense. Duncan then became a full-time starter on both offense and defense as a sophomore. That year, he was named first-team All-Flight A and an honorable mention All-State selection at linebacker while leading the team in tackles.

Although the Christiana High School Vikings posted poor records in the years leading up to his time there, Duncan helped lead a turnaround as they posted a combined record of 19–3 (Note: Listed in the Tampa Bay Times as 18–3, but reported in The News Journal as 19–3.) in his junior and senior seasons. The News Journal described him as "a central figure in Christiana's rise to power". During the 1991 season, he helped Christiana to a perfect 10–0 record in the regular season, leading a defense that only allowed touchdowns in two of the ten regular season games. Matt Zabitka noted that Duncan, who stood at 6 feet 1 inch (1.85 m) and weighed 205 pounds (93 kg) at Christiana, was "rock-solid" and the team's "steel curtain", with his "gritty, gutsy performance play[ing] a major role in Christiana's winning the Blue Hen Conference Flight A championship". Duncan was again the leading tackler for the Vikings as the team reached the 1991 Division I state championship, which they lost to William Penn High School. Duncan ran for 150 yards and three touchdowns in his last game. For his performance as a senior, he was named first-team All-Flight A and All-State at linebacker.

Prior to his senior year, Duncan moved from tight end to running back. He helped the Vikings to a record of 8–2 but the team missed the state playoffs. Duncan posted a team-leading seven interceptions, becoming the first linebacker to ever lead the school in that category. He was named first-team All-State at linebacker and honorable mention All-State at running back by the Delaware Sportswriters and Broadcasters Association, in addition to being named the state's Defensive Player of the Year by the organization. Duncan was also Delaware's Gatorade Player of the Year. At the conclusion of his high school career, he was selected to compete in the Delaware Blue–Gold All-Star Classic. Duncan's coach at Christiana, Bill Muehleisen, said he was "the best linebacker I have seen in 29 years of coaching. He is the consummate football player, no question about it ... He's a student of the game. He's into it mentally as well as physically."

In addition to football, Duncan was also a member of the basketball team. He played junior varsity basketball as a freshman, did not play as a sophomore, then saw limited playing time as a junior before winning a starting role as a senior. He was a member of a Christiana basketball team that made it to the quarterfinals of the state playoffs. While in high school, Duncan once was the champion of a free throw event at a Pennsylvania camp and thus won an opportunity to compete against Charles Barkley. He said, "[Barkley] shot all jumpers against me and won, like, 11–2 or 11–3. I was a big Sixers fan, so it was something I won't forget". Duncan signed to play college football for the Vanderbilt Commodores over offers from the Northwestern Wildcats and Maryland Terrapins.

== College career ==
At Vanderbilt, Duncan majored in human and organizational development. On the football team, he initially was planned to move from linebacker to strong safety. However, he ended up remaining at linebacker. He increased his weight to 230 pounds (100 kg) in college. During his freshman year in 1993, Duncan redshirted. He attended Vanderbilt road games and practiced with the team but saw no playing time. In 1994, after two of the team's top tacklers, Shelton Quarles and Rico Francis, graduated, Duncan won a starting role at outside linebacker. In this role, Duncan described himself as "a linebacker who can hit when I need to and cover receivers when I need to. I like to be versatile. I can react well in different situations." He immediately became the team's top tackler to begin the 1994 season, posting a team-leading 10 tackles in the season-opener, followed by a 16-tackle, two-sack showing in a 17–7 loss to the Alabama Crimson Tide. The Tennessean noted that he became a "fixture in his opponent's backfield". Through three games, he was Vanderbilt's leader with 36 tackles, along with three sacks and two pass deflections.

However, following the third game of his redshirt freshman season, Duncan, along with cornerback DeReal Finklin, was dismissed from the team "for alleged improper use of a debit card". He missed the rest of the season, but his eligibility was restored by the NCAA in July 1995 and he returned to the Commodores for the 1995 season. He resumed as starter and was described as the "strength" of the team's defense by the Miami Herald. While the Commodores compiled a record of 2–9, with only one win in Southeastern Conference (SEC) play, Duncan was a standout performer and one of the top tacklers in the SEC, finishing with 120 tackles that season, including 73 solo. He also tallied a sack, an interception, two forced fumbles and five pass deflections, leading a Vanderbilt defense which allowed only 138.3 yards per game. Among his performances that year was a 20-tackle effort in a 41–0 loss to the Notre Dame Fighting Irish, where he "by far played better than anybody on the field on [Vanderbilt's] defense", according to a teammate. He also totaled 14 tackles in a game against Kentucky and 11 each in games against the Arkansas Razorbacks and Tennessee Volunteers.

You can't help but notice him, especially when we're backpedaling, defending the pass, and they dump it off short and Jamie just kills somebody. What he does with the way he hits and the way he plays just gets the whole team excited.

— Vanderbilt teammate Eric Vance on Duncan

By his redshirt junior year in 1996, Duncan was considered the strongest player on the team. He was able to bench press 430 pounds (200 kg), leg squat 675 pounds (306 kg), and power clean 300 pounds (140 kg). Defensive coordinator Woody Widenhofer said that Duncan had "great strength, quickness and explosion" and guessed that "there isn't a middle linebacker as strong as Jamie in the country". The Tennessean noted him to be quiet and shy off the field, but "a tackling machine [who] streaks to ballcarriers, arriving with bone-jarring force" on the field. The paper stated Duncan was a "one-man horror show for opposing coaches who have to come up with a plan to deal with him", and wrote that many in the SEC "have memorized his jersey number or had it implanted on their chests by a Duncan hit".

To open the 1996 season, Duncan posted 16 tackles in a loss to Notre Dame and afterwards was selected the SEC Defensive Player of the Week. During the 1996 season, Vanderbilt had the worst-ranked offense in the NCAA Division I-A, and thus, as Duncan said, "Our defense was pretty much on the field the whole time". Although the Commodores played poorly throughout the season and compiled a record of 2–9, losing every SEC game, Duncan was one of the top defensive performers in the conference, leading the SEC with 152 tackles. His top game came against number-one ranked Florida, the eventual national champion, late in the season. Although Florida won, 28–21, Duncan tallied 19 tackles, a pass deflection, and two forced fumbles while sacking eventual Heisman Trophy winner Danny Wuerffel three times. He recovered one fumble and returned it 31 yards for a touchdown. For his performance, he was selected the SEC Defensive Player of the Week. At the end of the year, Duncan was chosen first-team All-SEC. His tackles total not only led the conference but also placed fourth in Vanderbilt history, and every game that year he was their tackles leader. He finished the year top on the team for solo tackles (113), assists (39), tackles-for-loss (14), sacks (six), forced fumbles (five), and pass breakups (five).

Duncan returned for a final season at Vanderbilt in 1997 and was named a team captain. While the Commodores went 3–8, losing all of their SEC games for a second-straight year, Duncan led what was the number one defense in the conference. He totaled 10 tackles and two sacks in his final game, finishing the 1997 season with 119 tackles. Duncan was unanimously named first-team All-SEC and honored as the SEC Defensive Player of the Year. He was also a first-team All-American as selected by the Football Writers Association of America, and was named Vanderbilt's MVP, an honor he had also received in 1996. Duncan graduated from Vanderbilt and finished his college career with 427 tackles, 12 sacks, seven forced fumbles, two fumble recoveries and two interceptions, remaining in the top five in school history in tackles as of 2026. Rod Williamson, the school's sports information director, said in 1998 that Duncan was "the most decorated player in the history of [Vanderbilt]". At the conclusion of his collegiate career, he was invited to the Senior Bowl. In 2009, he was honored as one of the SEC Football Legends.

== Professional career ==
=== Tampa Bay Buccaneers (1998–2001) ===
Duncan posted a 40-yard dash time of 4.65 seconds. He was selected by the Tampa Bay Buccaneers in the third round (84th overall) of the 1998 NFL draft. Duncan was considered a potential future successor to Buccaneers Pro Bowl linebacker Hardy Nickerson, the leader of the team's defense. He opened his rookie season as a backup to Nickerson and a special teams player, debuting in a Week 3 win over the Chicago Bears. Prior to Week 12, Duncan was thrust into a starting role due to Nickerson suffering from pericarditis, which caused him to miss the remainder of the season. Making his first start, Duncan recorded his first nine career tackles in a 28–25 loss to the Detroit Lions. The Tampa Bay Times stated that despite the loss, he "flawlessly called all defensive alignments" and "filled in admirably", leading a Buccaneer defense that only allowed Barry Sanders to run for 66 yards. Six of his tackles were solo and seven times he tackled Sanders, including twice for a loss. He followed the game against the Lions with 13 tackles in a win against the Chicago Bears, while the Bears only ran for 69 yards.

In the last six games of the season, Duncan helped the Buccaneers go from the sixth-ranked defense in the NFL to the second, and The Tampa Tribune said that "Duncan had a lot to do with the ascent". The team went 4–2 in games he started and allowed an average of only 15 points and 264 yards per game, compared to 20.5 points and 291.4 yards previously. Amidst Nickerson's absence, The Tampa Tribune noted that Duncan "ran the huddle as if it had been his for a decade. On the field, he never flinched", and defensive coordinator Monte Kiffin praised him as doing "a fantastic job" in his six starts. Duncan finished the 1998 season with 14 games played, six as a starter, and 36 (Note: Listed in The Tampa Tribune as 46.) tackles. According to The Tribune, his average in tackles per game was a mark bested by only three Buccaneers that year: Nickerson and future Pro Football Hall of Famers Derrick Brooks and John Lynch. Tampa Bay finished the 1998 season with a record of 8–8, placing third in their division.

With Nickerson returning in 1999 as the starter, Duncan saw limited playing time and was used on special teams. He was a member of a Buccaneers defense that ranked third in the NFL and appeared in all 16 games, none as a starter, posting six tackles on special teams. Duncan also forced a fumble on a kickoff in a game against the New Orleans Saints. The 1999 Buccaneers compiled a record of 11–5 and reached the NFC Championship Game, where they lost to the eventual Super Bowl champion St. Louis Rams.

After Nickerson left Tampa Bay in 2000, Duncan became the new starting middle linebacker. As defensive playcaller, he led the Tampa Bay defense and helped the team compile a record of 10–6 while starting 15 games. He posted his first NFL interception in a Week 4 loss to the New York Jets and had six games with at least five tackles, including 10 in a loss to the Washington Redskins, according to Pro Football Reference (PFR). His best performance of the season came in a Week 15, 16–13 win over the Miami Dolphins, where Duncan tallied seven tackles, recovered a fumble, deflected a pass, and returned an interception 31 yards for a touchdown, the Buccaneers' only touchdown that game. He was the Pro Football Weekly NFL Defensive Player of the Week for his performance. Duncan finished the regular season with totals of 66 tackles, including 49 solo, along with four interceptions returned for 55 yards, six pass deflections and a fumble recovered. He helped the Buccaneers reach the playoffs, where they lost to the Philadelphia Eagles in the wild card round 21–3, a game in which Duncan totaled 11 tackles and a tackle-for-loss.

Duncan re-signed with the Buccaneers on a one-year contract following the 2000 season. He missed much of training camp due to a hamstring strain and was challenged by Nate Webster for his middle linebacker spot but nevertheless remained starter for the 2001 season. He posted a career-high in tackles and placed second on the team behind Derrick Brooks in that category, recording a number listed in conflicting sources as 85 (Pro Football Reference) or 130 (St. Louis Post-Dispatch). He also tallied a career-high two sacks along with three passes defended, a forced fumble and one interception he returned for nine yards, as Tampa Bay compiled a record of 9–7 and lost to the Eagles in the wild card round of the playoffs for the second-straight year. Across four years with the Buccaneers, Duncan appeared in 60 games, 36 as a starter, and made 193 tackles, two sacks, two forced fumbles and five interceptions, according to PFR.

=== Later career ===
In March 2002, Duncan left Tampa Bay and signed a five-year, $11.2 million contract with the St. Louis Rams which included a $3 million signing bonus. He was signed as a replacement to starting middle linebacker London Fletcher. He suffered two broken fingers in preseason for the Rams but continued playing for them and ended up appearing in all 16 games that year. He was a starter in 12 and finished the season with 65 tackles, fourth on the team, and a pass deflection as the Rams finished second in their division with a record of 7–9, missing the playoffs. However, Duncan's play was considered an underperformance, and he was replaced by Robert Thomas as starting middle linebacker in 2003. After losing his starting role, he was one of the Rams' top tacklers on special teams and served as the special teams captain. He appeared in all 16 games but only started six, coming when Thomas and others were out with injuries. Overall, he tallied 41 tackles, a sack, three pass deflections and an interception in 2003, while also blocking a kick. The 2003 Rams won the division with a record of 12–4 but lost to the Carolina Panthers in the divisional round of the playoffs, 29–23 in double overtime.

Duncan was released by the Rams on April 26, 2004. Four days later, he signed with the Atlanta Falcons. He made the team as a backup middle linebacker, although he missed some time due to injury, including a torn pectoral muscle. With the Falcons, he played in only four games, two as a starter, recording a career-low eight tackles. The Falcons compiled a record of 11–5 and reached the NFC Championship, where they lost to the Philadelphia Eagles. Duncan became a free agent after the season and was not re-signed, ending his professional career. In seven years in the NFL, he played in 96 games, 56 as a starter, and posted 307 tackles, three sacks, six interceptions, 14 pass deflections, two forced fumbles and a fumble recovery, according to PFR. He scored one touchdown in his career on an interception return. As of 2026, Duncan remains the last alumnus of Christiana High School to play in the NFL, and one of only two all-time (along with Dan Reeder).

== Later life and honors ==
After his football career, Duncan entered business. He started a hairstyling studio in Bear, Delaware, in 2001, named Synergy Styling Studio. He later co-owned a bar called Tattoo Tavern in Daytona, Florida, and was active in real estate, working with Corey Chavous, a teammate from Vanderbilt and later player for the Rams. Duncan also was a partner in an "enterprise that brings quality dental care to low income populations around the United States".

In 1999, Duncan was ranked by Sports Illustrated as the 34th greatest sports figure to come from Delaware. He was inducted into the Vanderbilt Athletics Hall of Fame in 2013. In 2026, he was ranked by The News Journal as one of the top 10 greatest high school football players in Delaware history. That same year, he was inducted into the Delaware Sports Museum and Hall of Fame.

== NFL career statistics ==
Legend
**Bold**	Career high

=== Regular season ===
Year	Team	Games		Tackles				Interceptions				Fumbles			
Year	Team	GP	GS	Comb	Solo	Ast	Sck	Int	Yds	TD	Lng	FF	FR	Yds	TD
1998	TAM	14	6	36	30	6	0.0	0	0	0	0	0	0	0	0
1999	TAM	16	0	6	5	1	0.0	0	0	0	0	**1**	0	0	0
2000	TAM	15	15	66	49	17	0.0	**4**	**55**	**1**	**31**	0	**1**	0	0
2001	TAM	15	15	**85**	**64**	**21**	**2.0**	1	9	0	9	**1**	0	0	0
2002	STL	16	12	65	49	16	0.0	0	0	0	0	0	0	0	0
2003	STL	16	6	41	28	13	1.0	1	0	0	0	0	0	0	0
2004	ATL	4	2	8	8	0	0.0	0	0	0	0	0	0	0	0
		96	56	307	233	74	3.0	6	64	1	31	2	1	0	0

=== Postseason ===
Year	Team	Games		Tackles				Interceptions				Fumbles			
Year	Team	GP	GS	Comb	Solo	Ast	Sck	Int	Yds	TD	Lng	FF	FR	Yds	TD
1999	TAM	2	0	0	0	0	0.0	0	0	0	0	0	0	0	0
2000	TAM	1	1	**11**	**7**	**4**	0.0	0	0	0	0	0	0	0	0
2001	TAM	1	1	6	3	3	0.0	0	0	0	0	0	0	0	0
2003	STL	1	0	2	2	0	0.0	0	0	0	0	0	0	0	0
		5	2	19	12	7	0.0	0	0	0	0	0	0	0	0
