= Cosey Coleman =

American football player (born 1978)

No. 60
- Position: Offensive guard

Personal information
- Born: October 27, 1978 (age 48); Clarkston, Georgia, U.S.
- Listed height: 6 ft 4 in (1.93 m)
- Listed weight: 310 lb (141 kg)

Career information
- High school: Southwest DeKalb (Decatur, Georgia)
- College: Tennessee
- NFL draft: 2000: 2nd round, 51st overall pick

Career history
- Tampa Bay Buccaneers (2000–2004); Cleveland Browns (2005–2006)

Awards and highlights
- Super Bowl champion (XXXVII); BCS National Championship (1998); Consensus All-American (1999); 2× First-team All-SEC (1998, 1999)

Career NFL statistics
- Games played: 100
- Games started: 92
- Stats at Pro Football Reference

Cosey Casey Coleman (born October 27, 1978) is an American former professional football player who was an offensive guard in the National Football League (NFL) for seven seasons. He played college football for the Tennessee Volunteers, was a member of a BCS National Championship team, and received consensus All-American honors. A second-round pick in the 2000 NFL draft, Coleman played professionally for the Cleveland Browns and Tampa Bay Buccaneers of the NFL.

== Early life ==
Coleman attended Southwest DeKalb High School in Decatur, Georgia. He earned USA Today high school All-America honors playing high school football for the Southwest DeKalb Panthers.

== College career ==
Coleman received an athletic scholarship to attend the University of Tennessee, where he played for head coach Phillip Fulmer's Tennessee Volunteers football team from 1997 to 1999. Starting as a freshman in 1997, he played in 35 games, and starting 30 of them, over his three-season collegiate career. As a sophomore, he started all 13 games and helped lead the Volunteers to Southeastern Conference (SEC) Championships in 1997 and 1998 and a 23–16 victory over the Florida State Seminoles in the Fiesta Bowl to win the BCS National Championship. For his stellar play during the 1998 season, including going the entire season without allowing a quarterback sack, Coleman was named as a first-team All-SEC selection and a second-team All-American. He was a first-team All-SEC selection and was recognized as a consensus first-team All-American following his junior season in 1999. Coleman decided to forgo his senior season and entered the 2000 NFL Draft.

== Professional career ==
Coleman was selected in the second round with the 51st overall pick in the 2000 NFL draft by the Tampa Bay Buccaneers. As a rookie with Tampa Bay in the 2000 season, he appeared in eight games at both offensive guard positions. He moved into the starting lineup in 2001, starting for all 16 games and the Buccaneers' Wild Card Round playoff game. Looking to improve further, Coleman started 15 games in the 2002 season as well as all three playoff games, which included the Buccaneers' Super Bowl XXXVII victory. In that game, the Buccaneers dominated the Oakland Raiders en route to a 48–21 victory and his only Super Bowl title. Coleman started all 32 games over the 2003 and 2004 seasons and continued to cement his reputation as one of the league's best offensive linemen.

Following the 2004 season, Coleman moved on to the Cleveland Browns. He was promptly inserted into the starting lineup for a young Browns team. He played for the Browns for two seasons from 2005–2006, starting in 29 games.

Over his seven-year career, Coleman has played in 100 games, of which he started 92. Coleman announced his retirement from professional football in 2007 after seven years in the league due to bad knees, which not would allow him to pass a physical.

== Post-playing career ==
After retiring from professional football, Coleman re-enrolled at the University of Tennessee, where he majored in legal studies. He is currently an assistant coach for the Middleton High School football team. He has worked in the insurance industry.
