= Tim Wansley =

American football player (born 1978)

No. 31
- Position: Cornerback

Personal information
- Born: November 7, 1978 (age 47); Buford, Georgia, U.S.
- Listed height: 5 ft 8 in (1.73 m)
- Listed weight: 186 lb (84 kg)

Career information
- High school: Buford
- College: Georgia
- NFL draft: 2002: 7th round, 233rd overall pick

Career history
- Tampa Bay Buccaneers (2002–2003); Arizona Cardinals (2004)*; Cleveland Browns (2004)*
- * Offseason or practice squad member only

Awards and highlights
- Super Bowl champion (XXXVII); First-team All-SEC (2001); Second-team All-SEC (2000)

Career NFL statistics
- Tackles: 62
- Interceptions: 2
- Touchdowns: 1
- Stats at Pro Football Reference

Tim Wansley (born November 11, 1978) is an American former professional football player who was a cornerback in the National Football League (NFL). He played college football for the Georgia Bulldogs and was selected in the seventh round of the 2002 NFL draft by the Tampa Bay Buccaneers.

He played for the Tampa Bay Buccaneers in 2002 and 2003, starting six games and playing in 12 in 2003 (collecting two interceptions).

His season was highlighted by a return of one of the interceptions for 23 yards and a touchdown at Carolina on November 9, 2003. He then signed with the Cleveland Browns on Aug. 5, 2004, but was released prior to the start of the season.

He signed with the BC Lions of the Canadian Football League (CFL) in 2005 and was a member of the team's practice squad. He was re-signed by the team in 2006.
