= Charles Kirby =

American football player (born 1974)

No. 48
- Position: Fullback

Personal information
- Born: November 27, 1974 (age 51); Cairo, Georgia, U.S.
- Listed height: 6 ft 2 in (1.88 m)
- Listed weight: 249 lb (113 kg)

Career information
- High school: South View (Hope Mills, North Carolina)
- College: Virginia
- NFL draft: 1998: undrafted

Career history
- Indianapolis Colts (1998–1999); Kansas City Chiefs (1999–2000)*; Tampa Bay Buccaneers (2000–2001); Chicago Bears (2002)*
- * Offseason or practice squad member only
- Stats at Pro Football Reference

Charles Edward Kirby Jr. (born November 27, 1974) is an American former professional football player who was a fullback for the Tampa Bay Buccaneers of the National Football League. He played college football for the Virginia Cavaliers.

== College career ==
Kirby at the University of Virginia with the Cavaliers from 1994 to 1997, lettering all four years. Utilized primarily as a lead blocker, he carried the ball 34 times for 116 yards and caught 12 passes for 126 yards, recording one touchdown. While at Virginia, Kirby was a teammate of Ronde Barber, who he later played with as a Tampa Bay Buccaneer.

== Professional career ==
=== Indianapolis Colts ===
Kirby signed with the Indianapolis Colts on April 24, 1998, though he spent the whole 1998 season on the injured reserve list due to an Achilles injury. The Colts released him on September 6, 1999.

=== Kansas City Chiefs ===
Kirby was signed to the Kansas City Chiefs' practice squad in the second half of the 1999 season, never playing a game with the Chiefs. He was released by the Chiefs on August 22, 2000.

=== Tampa Bay Buccaneers ===
On September 12, 2000, Kirby was signed to the Tampa Bay Buccaneers' practice squad. He was promoted to the active roster on November 9 and played six games with the team in 2000, two of which he started. Prior to the 2001 season, Kirby suffered another Achilles injury, which proved to be season-ending. He was placed on injured reserve on August 10, 2001, and became a free agent on February 15, 2002.

=== Chicago Bears ===
Kirby signed a two-year contract with the Chicago Bears on April 29, 2002, but he was released on July 15.

== After football ==
In 2010, Kirby pledged to donate his brain and spinal cord tissue to the Center for the Study of Traumatic Encephalopathy at the Boston University School of Medicine.
