= Ed Coukart =

American football official

Ed Coukart was an American football official in the National Football League (NFL) from the 1989 to 2005 NFL season. He served as an umpire and officiated in Super Bowl XXXVII in 2003 and selected as an alternate for Super Bowl XXXII in 1998. Coukart wore the uniform number 71.

A native of Shadyside, Ohio, Coukart attended Northwestern University before graduating from Lasalle Law School and University of Wisconsin's Graduate School of Banking. Coukart later became the President of Potters Bank and Trust in East Liverpool, Ohio, where he resides. Upon retiring as an NFL official, he serves as a supervisor in the NFL front office. Some of Coukart's main responsibilities as a supervisor include traveling to one venue a week during the regular season and reviewing tapes from other games to analyze and evaluate the officiating in the game and training officials.

He called the first leaping penalty since 1938 in a 2003 Monday Night game between the Indianapolis Colts and the Tampa Bay Buccaneers at Raymond James Stadium in Tampa.
