= Nate Webster =

American football player (born 1977)

No. 52, 58
- Position: Linebacker

Personal information
- Born: November 29, 1977 (age 48); Miami, Florida, U.S.
- Listed height: 6 ft 0 in (1.83 m)
- Listed weight: 232 lb (105 kg)

Career information
- High school: Miami Northwestern
- College: Miami (FL)
- NFL draft: 2000: 3rd round, 90th overall pick

Career history
- Tampa Bay Buccaneers (2000–2003); Cincinnati Bengals (2004–2005); Denver Broncos (2006–2008)

Awards and highlights
- Super Bowl champion (XXXVII); Second-team All-American (1999); All-Big East (1998, 1999)

Career NFL statistics
- Total tackles: 351
- Sacks: 4
- Forced fumbles: 3
- Fumble recoveries: 4
- Pass deflections: 10
- Defensive touchdowns: 2
- Stats at Pro Football Reference

Nathaniel Webster Jr. (born November 29, 1977) is an American former professional football player who was a linebacker for the Tampa Bay Buccaneers, Cincinnati Bengals and Denver Broncos of the National Football League (NFL). He was selected by the Buccaneers in the third round of the 2000 NFL draft. He played college football for the Miami Hurricanes.

Webster was a two-time All-Big East selection who recorded 301 tackles, 14 tackles-for-losses and 7 sacks in just 22 starts in college. Webster entered the 2000 NFL draft following his junior season at Miami, and was selected by the Tampa Bay Buccaneers in third round with the 90th overall selection. He was traded in 2004 to Cincinnati. In 2006, he was signed by the Denver Broncos as a free agent.

== Legal troubles ==
While playing for the Miami Hurricanes football team, on October 16, 1999, Webster was arrested in Miami, Florida, for false imprisonment after he allegedly grabbed Natalie Brady (an ex-girlfriend) by the neck, threw her to the ground, and shoved her into a vehicle in which he was riding with a friend. A witness called police, who caught Webster fleeing in the vehicle. Webster pleaded not guilty to a reduced charge of three counts of battery, which were later dropped after Webster entered and completed a pre-trial diversion program. However, Brady filed a civil lawsuit, which was settled for an undisclosed amount in November 2001.

On June 10, 2011, Webster was indicted for sexual battery, gross sexual imposition and five counts of unlawful sexual contact with a minor. He is charged with having sex with a 15-year-old girl, the daughter of a former assistant coach for the Cincinnati team, and was arrested on July 21. According to an indictment unsealed subsequent to his arrest, Webster used guns to intimidate the girl into keeping their relationship quiet. The girl said he told her if she revealed the relationship, he would kill her and her family, Hamilton County prosecutor Joe Deters said. Prior to the incident, he was working as a coach at Bellevue High School in Bellevue, Kentucky. A jury trial was conducted in April 2012. The jury convicted him in April on four counts of unlawful sexual conduct with a minor, and he could have been sentenced to up to 36 years. He was, however, found not guilty of three other charges: gross sexual imposition, sexual battery and a fifth count of unlawful sexual conduct with a minor. On June 6, 2012, he was sentenced to 12 years in prison. Prosecutors said Webster rejected a proposed plea deal prior to the trial that would have sent him to prison for four years. His sentenced was reduced from 12 years to 10 years in September 25, 2013. He was granted an early release from prison on May 25, 2021.

== NFL career statistics ==
Legend
**Bold**	Career high

=== Regular season ===
Year	Team	Games		Tackles					Interceptions					Fumbles			
Year	Team	GP	GS	Cmb	Solo	Ast	Sck	TFL	Int	Yds	TD	Lng	PD	FF	FR	Yds	TD
2000	TAM	**16**	0	27	23	4	0.0	0	0	0	0	0	1	0	0	0	0
2001	TAM	**16**	1	40	28	12	0.0	2	0	0	0	0	**3**	0	0	0	0
2002	TAM	**16**	0	37	25	12	0.0	3	0	0	0	0	0	0	0	0	0
2003	TAM	15	5	52	26	**26**	1.0	2	0	0	0	0	0	0	**1**	0	0
2004	CIN	3	3	21	16	5	1.0	1	0	0	0	0	2	**1**	**1**	0	0
2005	CIN	1	0	0	0	0	0.0	0	0	0	0	0	0	0	0	0	0
2006	DEN	3	2	11	8	3	0.0	0	0	0	0	0	0	0	0	0	0
2007	DEN	**16**	**13**	**88**	**68**	20	0.0	**9**	0	0	0	0	**1**	1	**1**	17	**1**
2008	DEN	13	**13**	75	50	25	**2.0**	4	0	0	0	0	**3**	**1**	**1**	**34**	**1**
		99	37	351	244	107	4.0	21	0	0	0	0	10	3	4	51	2

=== Playoffs ===
Year	Team	Games		Tackles					Interceptions					Fumbles			
Year	Team	GP	GS	Cmb	Solo	Ast	Sck	TFL	Int	Yds	TD	Lng	PD	FF	FR	Yds	TD
2000	TAM	1	0	2	1	**1**	**0.5**	0	0	0	0	0	0	0	0	0	0
2001	TAM	1	0	0	0	0	0.0	0	0	0	0	0	0	0	0	0	0
2002	TAM	**3**	0	**3**	**3**	0	0.0	0	0	0	0	0	**2**	0	0	0	0
		5	0	5	4	1	0.5	0	0	0	0	0	2	0	0	0	0
