= Jameel Cook =

American football player (born 1979)

No. 43, 33
- Position: Fullback

Personal information
- Born: February 8, 1979 (age 47); Miami, Florida, U.S.
- Listed height: 5 ft 10 in (1.78 m)
- Listed weight: 225 lb (102 kg)

Career information
- High school: Miami Southridge (South Miami Heights, Florida)
- College: Illinois
- NFL draft: 2001: 6th round, 174th overall pick

Career history
- Tampa Bay Buccaneers (2001–2005); Houston Texans (2006–2007); Tampa Bay Buccaneers (2008)

Awards and highlights
- Super Bowl champion (XXXVII)

Career NFL statistics
- Rushing attempts: 14
- Rushing yards: 43
- Receptions: 84
- Receiving yards: 510
- Receiving touchdowns: 3
- Stats at Pro Football Reference

Jameel Antwon Cook Sr. (born February 8, 1979) is an American former professional football player who was a fullback in the National Football League (NFL). He was selected by the Tampa Bay Buccaneers in the sixth round of the 2001 NFL draft, playing nine seasons with the Buccaneers and Houston Texans. He played college football for the Illinois Fighting Illini.

Cook was a member of the Buccaneers team that won Super Bowl XXXVII.
