= Jeff Gooch =

American football player (born 1974)

No. 50
- Position: Linebacker

Personal information
- Born: October 31, 1974 (age 52); Nashville, Tennessee, U.S.
- Listed height: 5 ft 11 in (1.80 m)
- Listed weight: 225 lb (102 kg)

Career information
- College: Austin Peay
- NFL draft: 1996: undrafted

Career history
- Tampa Bay Buccaneers (1996–2001); Detroit Lions (2002–2003); Tampa Bay Buccaneers (2004–2005)

Career NFL statistics
- Tackles: 282
- Sacks: 2
- Interceptions: 1
- Stats at Pro Football Reference

Jeffrey Lance Gooch (born October 31, 1974) is a linebacker who played for 10 seasons for the Tampa Bay Buccaneers and Detroit Lions in the National Football League.

Gooch played at John Overton High School in Nashville, Tennessee and finished his career there with 215 tackles. Gooch went undrafted in the 1996 NFL draft out of Austin Peay State University. He was later signed by the Tampa Bay Buccaneers as an undrafted free agent. His rookie year, he appeared in 15 games for the Buccaneers, mostly on special teams. In 1997, he played in all 16 games while starting 5 of them. In 1998, Gooch registered his first career sack in a 24–22 victory over the Green Bay Packers as he started all 16 games and recorded 62 tackles. From 1999 to 2001, Gooch played in 44 out of 48 games, but he recorded only 65 tackles in the three seasons combined. In 2002, he left the Buccaneers to sign with the Detroit Lions where he played in all 16 games in both years with the team (2002–2003), while watching the Buccaneers win a Super Bowl before he returned to play his final season with the team. He later served as the Vice President of Football Operations for the Tampa Bay Storm of the Arena Football League.
