= Ricky Thomas =

American football player (born 1965)

Personal information
- Born: March 29, 1965 (age 61); London, England
- Listed height: 6 ft 4 in (1.93 m)
- Listed weight: 245 lb (111 kg)

Career information
- High school: Niceville (FL)
- College: Alabama
- NFL draft: 1987: undrafted

Career history

Playing
- Seattle Seahawks (1987)

Coaching
- Marion Military Institute (1988) Defensive backs coach; The McCallie School (TN) (1992–1996) Head coach; Kentucky (1996) Strength and conditioning assistant; Gardner–Webb (1997) Defensive backs coach; Tampa Bay Buccaneers (1997–2001) Tight ends coach; Indianapolis Colts (2002–2011) Offensive assistant & tight ends coach; Georgia State (2012) Defensive ends coach; Nevada (2013–2016) Cornerbacks coach; Southwest Minnesota State (2017–2018) Defensive backs coach

Awards and highlights
- Super Bowl champion (XLI)

Career NFL statistics
- Games played: 1
- Stats at Pro Football Reference

Ricky L. Thomas (born March 29, 1965) is an American former football coach and defensive back in the National Football League (NFL). He played college football at Alabama. Following a brief stint in the NFL as a player with the Seattle Seahawks, he began a long coaching career spanning thirty years spent at the high school, college, and NFL level, including time coaching for the Tampa Bay Buccaneers and Indianapolis Colts, with whom he earned a championship ring following the team's win in Super Bowl XLI. Following the conclusion of his coaching career in 2018, he returned to serve in an administrative role for The McCallie School in Chattanooga, Tennessee, where he was the head coach between 1992 and 1996.
