= Kenyatta Walker =

American gridiron football player (born 1979)

No. 67
- Position: Offensive tackle

Personal information
- Born: February 1, 1979 (age 47); Meridian, Mississippi, U.S.
- Listed height: 6 ft 5 in (1.96 m)
- Listed weight: 302 lb (137 kg)

Career information
- High school: Meridian
- College: Florida (1997–2000)
- NFL draft: 2001: 1st round, 14th overall pick

Career history
- Tampa Bay Buccaneers (2001–2006); Carolina Panthers (2007)*; Toronto Argonauts (2008)
- * Offseason or practice squad member only

Awards and highlights
- Super Bowl champion (XXXVII); PFWA All-Rookie Team (2001); PFW All-Rookie Team (2001); Second-team All-American (2000); Jacobs Blocking Trophy (2000); First-team All-SEC (2000); Second-team All-SEC (1999)

Career NFL statistics
- Games played: 75
- Games started: 73
- Stats at Pro Football Reference

Idrees Kenyatta Walker (born February 1, 1979) is an American former professional football player who was an offensive tackle in the National Football League (NFL) for six seasons. Walker played college football for the University of Florida. A first-round pick in the 2001 NFL draft, he played professionally for the Tampa Bay Buccaneers of the NFL.

== Early life ==
Walker was born in Meridian, Mississippi in 1979. He attended Meridian High School, where he was a standout high school football player for the Meridian Wildcats. As a senior in 1996, Walker was an all-state selection and received high school All-American honors from PrepStar and USA Today.

== College career ==
Walker accepted an athletic scholarship to attend the University of Florida in Gainesville, Florida, and played on the offensive line for coach Steve Spurrier's Florida Gators football team from 1998 to 2000, after redshirting in 1997. Walker was a second-team All-Southeastern Conference (SEC) selection in 1999 and received first-team All-SEC and second-team All-American honors in 2000, winning the SEC's Jacobs Blocking Trophy as a junior in 2000. After his junior season, Walker decided to forgo his final year of NCAA eligibility and enter the NFL draft.

After his NFL career ended, Walker returned to Gainesville to complete his degree, graduating from the University of Florida with a bachelor's degree in sociology in 2007.

=== Awards and honors ===
- Knoxville News-Sentinel All-SEC (1998)
- Football News Freshman All-American (1998)
- Co-recipient of Gators' Best Effort Award (1999)
- Second-team All-SEC (1999)
- Gators' Most Outstanding Offensive Lineman (2000)
- Consensus first-team All-SEC (2000)
- Jacobs Blocking Trophy (2000)
- All-American selection by Associated Press, Sporting News, Football News, Sports Xchange and Walter Camp (2000)
- Outland Trophy semifinalist (2000)

== Professional career ==
The Tampa Bay Buccaneers chose Walker in the first round (fourteenth pick overall) of the 2001 NFL Draft, and he played for the Buccaneers for six seasons from 2001 to 2006. He was originally slated to play left tackle and protect the quarterback's blindside. However, after his rookie season he was switched to right tackle, where he found success starting for the Buccaneer's Super Bowl XXXVII victory over the Oakland Raiders. After starting in seventy-three of the seventy-five games in which he played, the Buccaneers released Walker on March 1, 2007.

On August 13, 2007, the Carolina Panthers signed Walker as a free agent. He was released by the team on September 1 during final cuts. On September 8, 2008, Walker was signed by the Toronto Argonauts of the Canadian Football League (CFL), and was assigned to their practice roster.

== See also ==
- 2000 College Football All-America Team
- Florida Gators football, 1990–99
- List of Florida Gators football All-Americans
- History of the Tampa Bay Buccaneers
- List of Florida Gators in the NFL draft
- List of SEC Jacobs Blocking Trophy winners
- List of Tampa Bay Buccaneers first-round draft picks
- List of University of Florida alumni
