= DeMarcus Curry =

American football player (born 1975)

No. 76
- Position: Tackle

Personal information
- Born: April 30, 1975 (age 51); Columbus, Georgia, U.S.
- Listed height: 6 ft 5 in (1.96 m)
- Listed weight: 332 lb (151 kg)

Career information
- High school: Columbus (GA) Kendrick
- College: Auburn

Career history
- Tampa Bay Buccaneers (1999–2001); St. Louis Rams (2002)*
- * Offseason or practice squad member only

Career statistics
- Games played: 3
- Stats at Pro Football Reference

DeMarcus Jerrell Curry (born April 30, 1975) is an American former professional football player who was a tackle for the Tampa Bay Buccaneers of the National Football League (NFL) from 1999 to 2001. He played college football for the Auburn Tigers.
