= Super Bowl XXXVII =

2003 National Football League championship game

Oakland Raiders (1) (AFC) (11–5)	Tampa Bay Buccaneers (2) (NFC) (12–4)
21	48
Head coach: Bill Callahan	Head coach: Jon Gruden
	1	2	3	4	Total
OAK	3	0	6	12	21
TB	3	17	14	14	48
- Date: January 26, 2003
- Stadium: Qualcomm Stadium; San Diego, California
- MVP: Dexter Jackson, safety
- Favorite: Raiders by 4
- Referee: Bill Carollo
- Attendance: 67,603

Ceremonies
- National anthem: Dixie Chicks
- Coin toss: 1972 Miami Dolphins: Don Shula, Bob Griese, Larry Csonka, Larry Little, Jim Langer, Nick Buoniconti, Paul Warfield
- Halftime show: Shania Twain, No Doubt, and Sting

TV in the United States
- Network: ABC
- Announcers: Al Michaels, John Madden, Melissa Stark and Lynn Swann
- Nielsen ratings: 40.7 (est. 88.6 million viewers)
- Market share: 61
- Cost of 30-second commercial: $2.1 million

Radio in the United States
- Network: Westwood One
- Announcers: Marv Albert, Boomer Esiason, John Dockery and Warren Moon

Super Bowl XXXVII was an American football game between the American Football Conference (AFC) champion Oakland Raiders and the National Football Conference (NFC) champion Tampa Bay Buccaneers to decide the National Football League (NFL) champion for the 2002 season. The game was played on January 26, 2003, at Qualcomm Stadium in San Diego, California. The Buccaneers defeated the Raiders by the score of 48–21, tied with Super Bowl XXXV for the seventh-largest Super Bowl margin of victory, winning their first-ever Super Bowl. This was the first professional sports championship ever won by a Tampa-based team.

To date, this is the last Super Bowl to be played in the month of January, as all subsequent games have been played in February. It is also the last to have been played in the week following the conference championship games (the others being Super Bowls XVII, XXV, XXVIII, XXXIV, and XXXVI) and the last to be played at Qualcomm Stadium, which previously hosted Super Bowl XXII (then called Jack Murphy Stadium) and Super Bowl XXXII before it was demolished in 2021. Since the NFL no longer has a team in San Diego after the Chargers relocated to Los Angeles in 2017, and the league has a policy not to award Super Bowls to metropolitan areas that do not have a team within them, Super Bowl XXXVII will be the last to be played in San Diego for the foreseeable future unless an NFL team returns to the area.

This was the first Super Bowl in which the league's number one-ranked offense (Raiders) faced the league's number one-ranked defense (Buccaneers). The game sometimes is referred to as the "Gruden Bowl", because the primary storyline surrounding the game revolved around Jon Gruden. Gruden was the Raiders' head coach from 1998 to 2001, and as a result of a trade then became the Buccaneers head coach in 2002. Tampa Bay, "Gruden's new team", made their first Super Bowl appearance in team history after posting a 12–4 regular season record. The Raiders, "Gruden's old team", advanced to their fifth Super Bowl after an 11–5 regular season. Super Bowl XXXVII is also referred to as the "Pirate Bowl" or "Battle of the Pirates", due to both teams' pirate-themed mascots and logos.

The Raiders came into the game as four-point favorites. However, offensive struggles from the Raiders, and a dominant defensive performance from the Buccaneers throughout much of the game would unravel the juggernaut Raiders offense. Raiders quarterback Rich Gannon threw a Super Bowl record five interceptions, three of which were returned for touchdowns. The Buccaneers also sacked Gannon five times, and scored 34 consecutive points to build a 34–3 lead late in the third quarter. Buccaneers safety Dexter Jackson, who had two of those interceptions and returned them for 34 yards, was named Super Bowl MVP. Jackson became only the second safety and third defensive back named Super Bowl MVP.

== Background ==
=== Host selection process ===
NFL owners originally voted to award Super Bowl XXXVII to San Francisco during their October 15, 1997 meeting in Washington, D.C. The 49ers had recently announced plans for a new stadium, and were awarded the Super Bowl contingent upon its completion. This was the second time the city had been awarded the Super Bowl on a conditional basis. In 1994, Super Bowl XXXIII was awarded to Candlestick Park, based on a comprehensive stadium renovation plan. However, when funding for those renovation plans fell through, the hosting duties were withdrawn. This time around, the San Francisco hosting committee had planned to pursue XXXVI, but due to logistical complications, switched their proposal to XXXVII. The owners awarded the game to San Francisco, and no other cities were considered. They skipped the awarding of XXXVI, and scheduled the bidding for that game for the spring of 1998.

The plans for the new stadium and mall at Candlestick Point never materialized. Rumors quickly began to spread that the league would pull the game from San Francisco if no progress was made on stadium funding/construction. Like they attempted to do three years earlier for XXXIII, the Raiders once again stepped in, offering to move the game over to Oakland. Oakland mayor Jerry Brown put his support behind the effort, but it was rejected by league officials. On March 17, 1999, the league passed a resolution officially withdrawing the game from San Francisco.

The NFL immediately reopened the bidding for the game. San Diego (Qualcomm Stadium), which had lost out on XXXVI, announced its interest. Miami (Pro Player Stadium) was the only other city in consideration after Oakland dropped their plan once and for all. San Diego went in as an early favorite. They had just received "rave reviews" for XXXII, and there was a desire to keep the game on the west coast. San Diego was awarded the game during the May 26, 1999, owners meeting at Atlanta, needing only one round of balloting. It was the last Super Bowl played in California until Super Bowl 50 at Levi's Stadium in Santa Clara. It was also the final Super Bowl at Qualcomm Stadium before the Chargers relocated to Los Angeles in 2017, and before the facility was demolished in 2020, making it the last multi-purpose stadium to host the NFL's title game.

=== Oakland Raiders ===
Oakland Raiders owner Al Davis was known to have the lowest salaries for coaches in the league, and head coach Jon Gruden was no exception. Instead of paying a high salary for Gruden, Davis opted to trade the rights for Gruden to the Buccaneers in exchange for four draft picks. The Buccaneers ended up giving two first-round picks, two second-round picks and $8 million to the Raiders to get Gruden.

As a result of Gruden's departure, Raiders offensive coordinator Bill Callahan was promoted to head coach. Despite the loss of Gruden in 2002, the Raiders still managed to earn a share of the AFC's best record at 11–5. The offense led the league in total passing yards (4,689) and ranked second in total yards gained (6,451).

Raiders quarterback Rich Gannon had an MVP season, completing 418 out of 618 passes for 4,689 yards, 26 touchdowns, and 10 interceptions. His 418 completions and his 10 games with over 300 passing yards were both NFL records. He also ran 50 times for 156 yards and three touchdowns. Jerry Rice, who was already the NFL's all-time leader in nearly every receiving record after 17 seasons, had a Pro Bowl season for the 13th time in his career 1,211 receiving yards and seven touchdowns. Gannon's other weapons in passing game were 15-year veteran receiver Tim Brown (930 yards and two touchdowns) and young receiver Jerry Porter (688 yards and nine touchdowns). Multi-talented running back Charlie Garner was the team's leading rusher with 962 yards and seven touchdowns, while also leading all NFL running backs in receiving with 91 receptions for 941 yards and another four touchdowns. Running back Tyrone Wheatley was also a contributor with 419 rushing yards, while fullback Zack Crockett provided both of them with solid blocking and scored eight touchdowns. Up front, their offensive line was led by two Pro Bowlers, guard Lincoln Kennedy and center Barret Robbins.

The Raiders' weakness was primarily on their defense, which ranked 25th in the league in passing yards allowed (3,787) and 12th in total yards (5,240). Veteran Pro Bowl safety Rod Woodson recorded a league-leading eight interceptions including two touchdowns. Up front, their line was anchored by defensive tackle Rod Coleman, who led the team with 11 sacks. Behind him, the team had a solid veteran linebacker, Bill Romanowski, who was playing in his fifth Super Bowl. Defensive back Tory James was also a big contributor with four interceptions.

=== Tampa Bay Buccaneers ===
Gruden had trouble getting the offense in sync during his first year as the Buccaners' head coach. In 2002, the Buccaneers ranked 25th in the league in total yards gained (5,222). Quarterback Brad Johnson made the Pro Bowl, completing 281 out of 451 passes for 3,049 yards, 22 touchdowns, and six interceptions. Running back Michael Pittman led the team in rushing with 718 yards and one touchdown, and added 477 receiving yards. Pro Bowl fullback Mike Alstott had 548 rushing yards and five touchdowns, and also had 242 receiving yards and two touchdowns. Wide receiver Keyshawn Johnson led the team with 1,088 receiving yards and five touchdowns, while wide receiver Keenan McCardell had 670 receiving yards and six touchdowns.

The Buccaneers' defense was still the strength of the team, leading the NFL in total defense (252.8 yards per game), pass defense (155.6 yards per game), points allowed (12.3 points per game), passing touchdowns allowed (10), interceptions (31), and opponent passer rating (48.4). Brooks, Lynch, Sapp, and defensive end Simeon Rice all had Pro Bowl years. Brooks led the team with 87 tackles and excelled at pass coverage, recording five interceptions and four total touchdowns (an NFL record for a linebacker). The defense as a whole had nine total touchdowns during the regular season and playoffs. Rice led the team with 15.5 sacks. Sapp recorded 7.5 sacks and two interceptions. Cornerback Brian Kelly was also a big asset, leading the team with eight interceptions.

=== Playoffs ===
The second-seeded Buccaneers defeated the fourth-seeded San Francisco 49ers, 31–6, and the top-seeded Philadelphia Eagles, 27–10, to make the Super Bowl for the first time in franchise history. The Buccaneers defense was dominant in both games. Meanwhile, the top-seeded Raiders were victorious against the fourth-seeded New York Jets, 30–10, and the second-seeded Tennessee Titans, 41–24. The Raiders won against the Titans through Gannon's pass-oriented offense.

=== Super Bowl pregame news ===
The Raiders entered the game favored to win in their first Super Bowl in 19 years. They were also the first franchise to appear in the Super Bowl in four decades (1960s, 1970s, 1980s, 2000s). However, much of the media hype surrounded the Gruden trade prior to the season. This forced league commissioner Paul Tagliabue to issue a statement that he might ban all future trades for coaches involving draft choices because it might compromise the draft.

A distraction for the Raiders was that starting center Barret Robbins went missing for most of the day before the Super Bowl. Hours before the game, he was admitted to a San Diego hospital, then spent time in rehab at the Betty Ford Clinic. He was subsequently diagnosed with bipolar disorder; it turned out that his disappearance was due to a manic episode. Robbins later said he had gone across the border and spent his missing time partying in Tijuana, Mexico, so disoriented that he thought the Raiders had already won the game and he was celebrating the victory. Backup Adam Treu (a former Pro Bowl selection) replaced Robbins.

The Buccaneers, as the designated home team, wore red jerseys and pewter pants. The kit is normally used at home for the second half of the season; the Buccaneers wear white at home during the first half due to the late summer-early autumn heat. The Raiders donned white jerseys with silver pants, the same combination they wore in Super Bowls XI and XV (both victories).

== Broadcasting ==
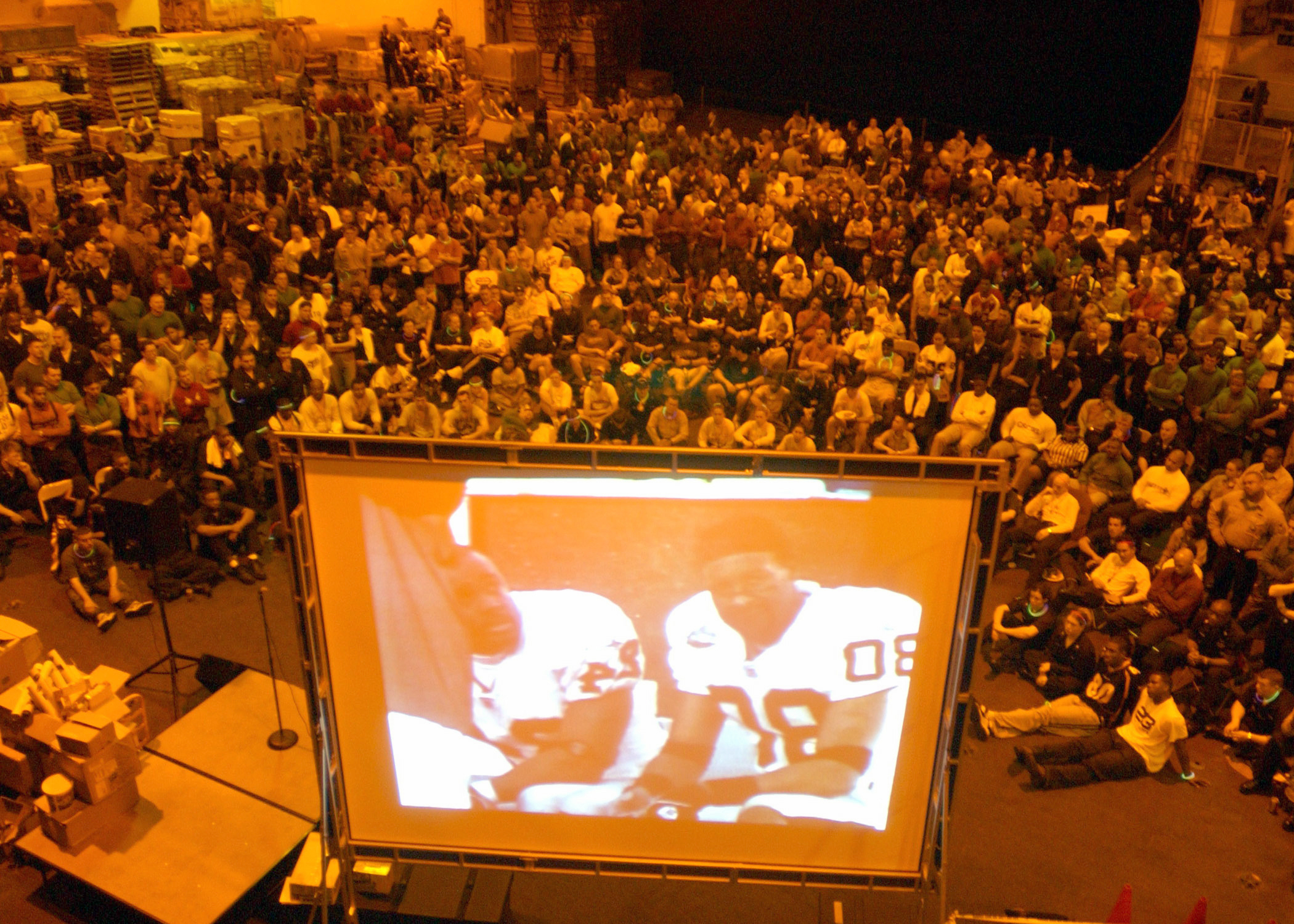
Sailors watching Super Bowl XXXVII in the hangar bay of USS Theodore Roosevelt (CVN-71)

The game was broadcast in the United States by ABC, with Al Michaels handling the play-by-play duties and color commentator John Madden. Madden became the first person to announce Super Bowls on different networks in consecutive years, having called Super Bowl XXXVI on Fox and then moving to ABC after Pat Summerall retired. Melissa Stark and Lynn Swann served as sideline reporters. Chris Berman from Disney-owned corporate sibling ESPN hosted all the events. Berman was joined by fellow ESPN analyst Steve Young, Baltimore Ravens head coach Brian Billick, and New York Giants defensive end Michael Strahan.

The Super Bowl was the first of three major professional sports championship series ABC broadcast in 2003, as they would also broadcast the Stanley Cup Finals and the NBA Finals. Both the Super Bowl and the Stanley Cup Finals ended up being hosted by Berman (who co-hosted the Stanley Cup Finals with John Saunders). The state of California ended up having representation in both Super Bowl XXXVII and the 2003 Stanley Cup Finals after the Mighty Ducks of Anaheim advanced to the latter. ABC's lead NHL broadcast team of Gary Thorne, Bill Clement, and John Davidson mentioned all of these when they called the Stanley Cup Finals.

For its Super Bowl lead-out program, ABC aired an episode of Alias titled "Phase One". Then after the break for late local news, the network premiered its new late night talk show Jimmy Kimmel Live!.

NBC, which did not hold any NFL television rights during this time between the 1998 and 2005 seasons, provided counter-programming against the halftime show, airing a live segment of "Weekend Update" from the comedy–variety show Saturday Night Live featuring Jimmy Fallon and Tina Fey.

Memorable television commercials that aired during the game included the "Terry Tate: Office Linebacker" Reebok ad and the Budweiser Zebra Referee. Adbowl ranked FedEx's "Castaway" as the best commercial of the year.

On the radio side, the game was carried nationally by Westwood One. Marv Albert, in his first season as the network's lead NFL voice, called the game with Boomer Esiason as his analyst. John Dockery and Warren Moon reported from the field. Locally, the Raiders' broadcast was carried by their then-flagship KSFO with Greg Papa as lead announcer and Tom Flores as analyst. The Buccaneers' then-flagship WDAE carried their broadcast, with Gene Deckerhoff as lead announcer and Scot Brantley as analyst.

== Entertainment ==
=== Pre-game ceremonies ===
A pre-game concert featured a performance by Carlos Santana with guests Beyoncé Knowles and Michelle Branch. During its pre-game show, ABC also aired a pre-game concert outside of the stadium, which featured Bonnie Raitt, Goo Goo Dolls and Michael Bublé. French-Canadian singer Celine Dion performed "God Bless America", while country group The Dixie Chicks performed the national anthem.

As the New England Patriots' did the previous year, both teams were introduced and entered as a team rather than individually by offensive and defensive starters, establishing this as the new standard practice. To honor the 30th anniversary of the 17–0 undefeated, perfect season of the 1972 Miami Dolphins, the following members of that team appeared during the coin toss ceremony: Don Shula, Bob Griese, Larry Csonka, Larry Little, Jim Langer, Nick Buoniconti, Paul Warfield.

=== Halftime show ===
The Super Bowl XXXVII halftime show was headlined by Shania Twain, No Doubt, and Sting.

=== Post-game ceremonies ===
Bon Jovi appeared as part of the post-game ceremonies, performing "It's My Life" prior to the Vince Lombardi Trophy presentation and "Everyday" afterwards (most of the latter performance was not shown on ABC because the network cut to commercials).

== Game summary ==
External videos
- Full game broadcast on ABC on YouTube

=== First quarter ===
The Raiders had a great chance to score a touchdown early in the game after cornerback Charles Woodson intercepted Buccaneers quarterback Brad Johnson's pass on the third play of the game and returned it 12 yards to the Buccaneers' 36-yard line. However, six plays later, defensive end Simeon Rice sacked quarterback Rich Gannon on third down, forcing the Raiders to settle for kicker Sebastian Janikowski's 40-yard field goal to give them a 3–0 lead.

Buccaneers running back Aaron Stecker returned the ensuing kickoff 27 yards to the 29-yard line, then appeared to fumble the ball while being tackled. Although the officials initially ruled that the ball was recovered by Raiders defensive back Eric Johnson, the Buccaneers challenged the call, and instant replay determined that both of Stecker's knees were down, and the ball did not come loose until he hit the ground. Buccaneers head coach Jon Gruden and Stecker appeared upset at having to use a challenge so early in the game, when they both believed Stecker was clearly down.

On the first play of the drive, Brad Johnson completed an 11-yard pass to wide receiver Joe Jurevicius. Johnson's next two passes were incomplete, but he then completed a 23-yard pass to Jurevicius on 3rd-and-10 to advance the ball to the Raiders' 37-yard line. Running back Michael Pittman then rushed for a 23-yard gain to the 13-yard line. However, on the next three plays, the Raiders' defense limited the Buccaneers to a pair of incompletions and a 1-yard run by Stecker. Kicker Martín Gramática then made a 31-yard field goal to tie the game, 3–3. After the teams exchanged punts twice, with less than two minutes left in the quarter, a 17-yard punt return by cornerback Darrien Gordon gave the Raiders the ball at their own 49-yard line. Gannon then threw an 8-yard pass to running back Charlie Garner to reach the Buccaneers' 43-yard line. However, on third down, safety Dexter Jackson intercepted Gannon's pass at the 40-yard line and returned it 9 yards to near midfield.

=== Second quarter ===
Nine plays after the turnover, Gramática kicked his second field goal from 43 yards to give the Buccaneers a 6–3 lead.

Jackson intercepted another pass on the Raiders' next drive and returned it 25 yards to the Raiders' 45-yard line, making him the first player ever to record two interceptions in the first half of the Super Bowl. However, the Buccaneers were unable to take advantage of the turnover and were forced to punt. The Buccaneers got a big assist from their punter Tom Tupa, who managed to pin the Raiders all the way back at their own 11-yard line. The Raiders could not move the ball either, losing a yard on three plays with their ensuing drive. Buccaneers wide receiver Karl Williams then returned Shane Lechler's punt 25 yards, giving the Buccaneers great field position at the Raiders' 27-yard line. Aided by Pittman's gains of 6 and 19 yards, the Buccaneers scored the first touchdown of the game on a 2-yard run by fullback Mike Alstott, increasing their lead to 13–3. After forcing the Raiders to punt, with 3:45 left in the half, the Buccaneers drove 77 yards in nine plays, assisted by a pair of catches by Alstott for 28 yards and four runs by Pittman for 20 yards. Johnson finished the drive with a 5-yard touchdown pass to wide receiver Keenan McCardell to give the Buccaneers a 20–3 halftime lead.

=== Third quarter ===
The Buccaneers continued to dominate the game for most of the third quarter. The Buccaneers forced the Raiders to punt on the opening drive of the second half. Next, the Buccaneers marched 89 yards on a 14-play drive, which was highlighted by Johnson's two passes to Jurevicius for 44 yards and took 7:52 off the clock. The drive ended with Johnson's 8-yard touchdown pass to McCardell to increase their lead to 27–3. Then on the second play of the Raiders' ensuing drive, Buccaneers safety Dwight Smith intercepted Gannon's pass and returned it 44 yards for a touchdown, making the score 34–3 in favor of the Buccaneers.

After giving up 34 consecutive points, the Raiders finally managed to drive 82 yards down the field, aided by a 25-yard reception by tight end Doug Jolley. The drive ended with a 39-yard touchdown completion from Gannon to wide receiver Jerry Porter. Although he was initially ruled as being out of bounds, the Raiders challenged the call, and it was determined that Porter had both feet in the end zone when he caught the ball. Gannon was sacked by Simeon Rice on the two-point conversion attempt, but the Raiders had cut their deficit to 34–9.

=== Fourth quarter ===
The Raiders' touchdown seemed to fire up their defense, who forced the Buccaneers to a fourth down on their ensuing possession. On the second play of the final quarter, Raiders linebacker Tim Johnson blocked Tupa's punt, and the ball flew high into the air and into the arms of Eric Johnson, who returned it 13 yards for a touchdown. Another two-point conversion failed when Gannon threw the ball over wide receiver Tim Brown's head, but the Buccaneers' lead was cut to 34–15.

The Buccaneers responded by moving the ball to the Raiders' 9-yard line on their ensuing drive, featuring a 16-yard pass interference penalty against Woodson and a 24-yard run by Pittman, but during a 27-yard field goal attempt by Gramática, Tupa fumbled the snap, and Gramática attempted to run the ball himself before getting tackled by cornerback Tory James, giving the ball to the Raiders on their own 22-yard line. After completing two passes to Jolley for 23 yards, Gannon threw a 48-yard touchdown pass to wide receiver Jerry Rice with 6:06 left in the game, cutting the Raiders' deficit to 34–21 and were only two touchdowns away from taking the lead. The Raiders' two-point conversion failed for the third straight time when Porter caught the ball out of bounds after being forced out by linebacker Nate Webster, but the officials deemed no interference, and therefore that part of the play was non-reviewable. Nonetheless, the Raiders challenged the call, but the ruling stood, and they were charged a timeout.

In an attempt to prevent a Raiders comeback, the Buccaneers managed to run the clock down to 2:44 on their ensuing drive before being forced to punt. Then on 3rd-and-18 from the Raiders' 29-yard line, linebacker Derrick Brooks cemented the Buccaneers' first Super Bowl title by intercepting a Gannon pass intended for wide receiver Marcus Knight and returning it 44 yards for a touchdown, giving the Buccaneers a 41–21 lead with only 1:18 left, and leading Buccaneers radio announcer Gene Deckerhoff to make his famous call: "The dagger's in, we're gonna win the Super Bowl!". Five plays later, Smith intercepted another pass, which was deflected by defensive end Greg Spires, and returned it 50 yards for his second touchdown of the game with only two seconds remaining, capping off the scoring at 48–21. Smith's two pick sixes made him the first player in Super Bowl history to score two defensive touchdowns. Raiders defensive lineman Chris Cooper returned Gramática's kickoff 6 yards before being tackled by linebacker Jack Golden, ending the game. Gannon said after the game that his performance was "nightmarish". With the win, Jon Gruden became, at 39, the youngest head coach to win a Super Bowl, surpassing John Madden who won Super Bowl XI at the age of 40.

=== Box score ===
Super Bowl XXXVII: Tampa Bay Buccaneers 48, Oakland Raiders 21

Quarter	1	2	3	4	Total
Raiders (AFC)	3	0	6	12	21
Buccaneers (NFC)	3	17	14	14	48

at Qualcomm Stadium, San Diego, California

- Date: January 26, 2003
- Game time: 3:26 p.m. PST
- Game weather: 81 °F (27 °C), sunny
- Super Bowl XXXVII Box Score

Scoring summary

Quarter	Time	Drive			Team	Scoring information	Score	
Quarter	Time	Plays	Yards	TOP	Team	Scoring information	OAK	TB
1	10:40	7	14	2:55	OAK	40-yard field goal by Sebastian Janikowski	3	0
1	7:51	9	58	2:49	TB	31-yard field goal by Martín Gramática	3	3
2	11:16	9	26	3:53	TB	43-yard field goal by Gramática	3	6
2	6:24	4	27	2:02	TB	Mike Alstott 2-yard touchdown run, Gramática kick good	3	13
2	0:30	10	77	3:15	TB	Keenan McCardell 5-yard touchdown reception from Brad Johnson, Gramática kick good	3	20
3	5:30	14	89	7:52	TB	McCardell 8-yard touchdown reception from Johnson, Gramática kick good	3	27
3	4:47	—	—	—	TB	Interception returned 44 yards for touchdown by Dwight Smith, Gramática kick good	3	34
3	2:14	8	82	2:33	OAK	Jerry Porter 39-yard touchdown reception from Rich Gannon, 2-point pass no good	9	34
4	14:16	—	—	—	OAK	Eric Johnson 13-yard punt block return for a touchdown, 2-point pass no good	15	34
4	6:06	8	78	2:56	OAK	Jerry Rice 48-yard touchdown reception from Gannon, 2-point pass no good	21	34
4	1:18	—	—	—	TB	Interception returned 44 yards for touchdown by Derrick Brooks, Gramática kick good	21	41
4	0:02	—	—	—	TB	Interception returned 50 yards for touchdown by Smith, Gramática kick good	21	48
"TOP" = time of possession. For other American football terms, see Glossary of American football.							21	48

=== Statistical overview ===
The Buccaneers dominated the Raiders, out-gaining them in total yards (365–269), rushing yards (150–19), first downs (24–11), offensive plays (76–60), and forced turnovers (5–1). As many sports fans and writers predicted, Gruden's prior knowledge of the Raiders was a major factor. The most damaging piece of evidence is NFL Films footage of Buccaneers defensive back John Lynch telling his teammates during the game that almost all of the plays ran by the Raiders' offense were plays that Gruden (who that week even played the part of "Rich Gannon" by playing quarterback with the scout-team offense) specifically told them to look out for. Better still for the Buccaneers was that the Raiders hadn't changed their audible-calling signals that Gruden himself had installed, thus tipping off plays repeatedly.

Johnson finished the game with 18 out of 34 completions for 215 yards and 2 touchdowns, with 1 interception, along with 10 rushing yards. Pittman was the top rusher of the game with 129 yards. Alstott was the game's second leading rusher with 15 yards and a touchdown, and had 5 receptions for 43 yards. Joe Jurevicius was the game's leading receiver with 4 receptions for 78 yards. Keyshawn Johnson recorded 6 catches for 69 yards. Smith recorded 2 interceptions, 94 return yards, and 2 touchdowns. He also added another 23 yards on a kickoff return.

Gannon finished the game 24 out of 44 for 272 yards and 2 touchdowns, but was intercepted a Super Bowl record 5 times for a 48.9 passer rating. Garner was their leading rusher, but with only 10 yards, and caught 7 passes for 51 yards. Rice was the Raiders' leading receiver of the game with 5 catches for 77 yards and a touchdown. He became the first player to score touchdowns with two teams in Super Bowls (Ricky Proehl, Rob Gronkowski, and Muhsin Muhammad have since joined him). Wide receiver Marcus Knight returned 8 kickoffs for 143 yards.

Jerry Rice and Bill Romanowski joined Gene Upshaw as the only players to appear in Super Bowls in three decades. Rice played in Super Bowls XXIII, XXIV, and XXIX. Romanowski played in Super Bowls XXIII, XXIV, XXXII, and XXXIII; the Raiders' loss prevented Romanowski from joining Charles Haley as the only NFL players at that time to earn 5 Super Bowl rings (Haley was also with the 49ers for Super Bowls XXIII and XXIV, and later earned rings when the Dallas Cowboys won Super Bowls XXVII, XXVIII, and XXX). The Raiders became the first team to appear in Super Bowls under four head coaches. John Rauch coached them in Super Bowl II, John Madden (who himself called Super Bowl XXXVII on ABC), coached them in Super Bowl XI and Tom Flores coached them in Super Bowl XV and XVIII.

The teams combined for the most second half points in a Super Bowl with 46 (28 for the Buccaneers and 18 for the Raiders) and the third most total points in a game with 69, tying the Dallas Cowboys and Buffalo Bills who combined for 69 points in Super Bowl XXVII.

== Final statistics ==
Sources: NFL.com Super Bowl XXXVII, Super Bowl XXXVII Play Finder TB, Super Bowl XXXVII Play Finder Oak, Super Bowl XXXVII Play by Play

=== Statistical comparison ===
	Oakland Raiders	Tampa Bay Buccaneers
First downs	11	24
First downs rushing	1	6
First downs passing	9	15
First downs penalty	1	3
Third down efficiency	7/16	6/15
Fourth down efficiency	0/0	0/1
Net yards rushing	19	150
Rushing attempts	11	42
Yards per rush	1.7	3.6
Passing – Completions-attempts	24/44	18/34
Times sacked-total yards	5–22	0-0
Interceptions thrown	5	1
Net yards passing	250	215
Total net yards	269	365
Punt returns-total yards	3–29	1–25
Kickoff returns-total yards	9–149	4–90
Interceptions-total return yards	1–12	5–172
Punts-average yardage	5–39.0	5–31.0
Fumbles-lost	1–0	1–0
Penalties-yards	7–51	5–41
Time of possession	22:46	37:14
Turnovers	5	1

=== Individual statistics ===
Raiders passing
	C/ATT^{1}	Yds	TD	INT	Rating
Rich Gannon	24/44	272	2	5	48.9
Raiders rushing
	Car^{2}	Yds	TD	LG^{3}	Yds/Car
Charlie Garner	7	10	0	4	1.43
Zack Crockett	2	6	0	4	3.00
Rich Gannon	2	3	0	2	1.00
Raiders receiving
	Rec^{4}	Yds	TD	LG^{3}	Target^{5}
Charlie Garner	7	51	0	9	11
Jerry Rice	5	77	1	48t	8
Doug Jolley	5	59	0	25	7
Jerry Porter	4	62	1	39t	9
Tim Brown	1	9	0	9	2
Jon Ritchie	1	7	0	7	1
Tyrone Wheatley	1	7	0	7	1
Marcus Knight	0	0	0	0	3

Buccaneers passing
	C/ATT^{1}	Yds	TD	INT	Rating
Brad Johnson	18/34	215	2	1	79.9
Buccaneers rushing
	Car^{2}	Yds	TD	LG^{3}	Yds/Car
Michael Pittman	29	124	0	24	4.28
Mike Alstott	10	15	1	5	1.50
Brad Johnson	1	10	0	10	10.00
Aaron Stecker	1	1	0	1	1.00
Tom Tupa	1	0	0	0	0.00
Buccaneers receiving
	Rec^{4}	Yds	TD	LG^{3}	Target^{5}
Keyshawn Johnson	6	69	0	18	11
Mike Alstott	5	43	0	16	8
Joe Jurevicius	4	78	0	33	4
Keenan McCardell	2	13	2	8t	3
Ken Dilger	1	12	0	12	3
Rickey Dudley	0	0	0	0	1

^{1}Completions/attempts ^{2}Carries ^{3}Long gain ^{4}Receptions ^{5}Times targeted

== Starting lineups ==
Pro Football Hall of Fame‡

Oakland	Position	Position	Tampa Bay
Offense
Tim Brown‡	WR		Keyshawn Johnson
Barry Sims	LT		Roman Oben
Frank Middleton	LG		Kerry Jenkins
Adam Treu	C		Jeff Christy
Mo Collins	RG		Cosey Coleman
Lincoln Kennedy	RT		Kenyatta Walker
Doug Jolley	TE		Ken Dilger
Jerry Rice‡	WR		Keenan McCardell
Rich Gannon	QB		Brad Johnson
Jerry Porter	WR	FB	Mike Alstott
Charlie Garner	RB		Michael Pittman
Defense
DeLawrence Grant	DE	LE	Greg Spires
Sam Adams	DT		Warren Sapp‡
John Parrella	DT	NT	Chuck Darby
Regan Upshaw	DE	RE	Simeon Rice
Bill Romanowski	LLB	SLB	Dwight Smith
Napoleon Harris	MLB		Shelton Quarles
Eric Barton	RLB	WLB	Derrick Brooks‡
Charles Woodson‡	LCB		Brian Kelly
Tory James	RCB		Ronde Barber‡
Anthony Dorsett	SS		John Lynch‡
Rod Woodson‡	FS		Dexter Jackson

== Post-game riots ==
In Oakland, after the Raiders' loss, riots broke out on the streets of East Oakland. Twelve cars were set on fire and 400 police officers were sent to the streets.

== Aftermath ==
The Tampa Tribune published a book by several staff writers called Pewter Power about the Buccaneers' winning season.

Both teams entered a period of decline after the Super Bowl that saw them enter lengthy playoff droughts. Neither made the playoffs in 2003, as the Buccaneers finished 7–9 and the Raiders finished 4–12. Furthermore, the Buccaneers finished 5–11 in 2004, becoming the first Super Bowl winning team to follow up with consecutive losing seasons. The Buccaneers had only two subsequent postseason appearances in 2005 and 2007 and did not win another playoff game until their second Super Bowl-winning season in 2020. The Raiders went 14 seasons without a winning record or playoff appearance, not obtaining either again until 2016, and have not won a playoff game since this season. The 2002 season also marked the Raiders' final postseason victory in Oakland following their relocation to Las Vegas in 2020.

In January 2013, retired Raiders wide receiver Tim Brown accused head coach Bill Callahan of deliberately throwing the game, stating that Callahan originally planned the Raiders' strategy around running the ball, since the Raiders' offensive line outweighed the Buccaneers' defensive line by a significant amount. However, Brown claimed Callahan changed the game plan to a more pass-heavy strategy two days before the game. While Brown stopped short of saying he was sure Callahan ruined their game plan on purpose, he said, "But the facts are what they are, that less than 36 hours before the game we changed our game plan. And we go into that game absolutely knowing that we have no shot. That the only shot we had if Tampa Bay didn't show up." Brown also suggested the change contributed to Barret Robbins' mental breakdown, saying "Barret Robbins begged Coach Callahan, 'Do not do this to me. I don't have time to make my calls, to get my calls ready. You can't do this to me on Friday. We haven't practiced full speed, we can't get this done. I'm not saying one had anything to do with the other. All I'm saying is those are the facts of what happened Super Bowl week. So our ire wasn't towards Barret Robbins, it was towards Bill Callahan. Because we feel as if he wouldn't have did what he did, then Barret wouldn't have done what he did."

Jerry Rice echoed Brown's concerns, saying "For some reason - and I don't know why - Bill Callahan did not like me." "In a way, maybe because he didn't like the Raiders, he decided, 'Maybe we should sabotage this a little bit and let Jon Gruden go out and win this one." Raiders linebacker Bill Romanowski disagreed, calling Brown's accusations "delusional".

"I am shocked, saddened and outraged by Tim Brown's allegations and Jerry Rice's support of those allegations," Callahan replied. "To leave no doubt, I categorically and unequivocally deny the sum and substance of their allegation. To suggest otherwise, especially at this time when it involves the Super Bowl, is ludicrous and defamatory. Any suggestion that I would undermine the integrity of the sport that I love and dedicated my life to, or dishonor the commitment I made to our players, coaches and fans, is flat out wrong. I think it would be in the best interests of all including the game America loves that these allegations be retracted immediately."

== Officials ==
- Referee: Bill Carollo #63 second Super Bowl (XXXI as side judge)
- Umpire: Ed Coukart #71 second Super Bowl (originally alternate for XXXII, but entered game when Jim Quirk was injured)
- Head linesman: Dale Williams #8 third Super Bowl (XX, XXVI)
- Line judge: Mark Steinkerchner #84 first Super Bowl
- Side judge: Rick Patterson #15 first Super Bowl
- Field judge: Tom Sifferman #118 first Super Bowl
- Back judge: Don Carey #126 first Super Bowl
- Replay official: Rex Stuart
- Video operator: Mike Wimmer
