= Eric Vance =

American football player (born 1975)

No. 33, 37
- Position: Cornerback

Personal information
- Born: July 14, 1975 (age 51); Tampa, Florida, U.S.
- Listed height: 6 ft 2 in (1.88 m)
- Listed weight: 215 lb (98 kg)

Career information
- High school: L. D. Bell (Hurst, Texas)
- College: Vanderbilt
- NFL draft: 1997: undrafted

Career history
- Carolina Panthers (1997)*; San Diego Chargers (1997)*; Tampa Bay Buccaneers (1998)*; Indianapolis Colts (1998)*; Tampa Bay Buccaneers (1998–1999); San Diego Chargers (2000)*; Tampa Bay Buccaneers (2000–2001); Indianapolis Colts (2002)
- * Offseason or practice squad member only

Career NFL statistics
- Tackles: 29
- Stats at Pro Football Reference

Eric Devon Vance (born July 14, 1975) is an American former professional football player who was a defensive back in the National Football League (NFL). He was signed by the Carolina Panthers as an undrafted free agent in 1997. He played college football for the Vanderbilt Commodores.

Vance also played for the Tampa Bay Buccaneers and Indianapolis Colts. Vance worked in Player Development for the Tampa Bay Buccaneers and was hired by Al Golden on April 4, 2013, to become assistant director of Football Operations at the University of Miami, and was the defensive coordinator at his Alma mater L. D. Bell . Vance Currently serves as the head coach of the Keller Central High School Chargers Football Team.
