= David Gibson (American football) =

American football player (born 1977)

No. 46, 22, 26, 34
- Position: Safety

Personal information
- Born: November 5, 1977 (age 49); Santa Ana, California, U.S.
- Listed height: 6 ft 1 in (1.85 m)
- Listed weight: 210 lb (95 kg)

Career information
- High school: Mater Dei (Santa Ana)
- College: USC
- NFL draft: 2000: 6th round, 193rd overall pick

Career history
- Tampa Bay Buccaneers (2000–2002); Indianapolis Colts (2002); Tampa Bay Buccaneers (2003); Cleveland Browns (2004)*
- * Offseason or practice squad member only

Awards and highlights
- First-team All-Pac-10 (1999)

Career NFL statistics
- Tackles: 95
- Interceptions: 1
- Sacks: 1
- Stats at Pro Football Reference

David Allan Gibson (born November 5, 1977) is an American former professional football player who was a safety in the National Football League (NFL). He played college football for the USC Trojans.

== Early life ==
Gibson prepped at Mater Dei High School in Santa Ana.

== College career ==
Gibson played college football at the University of Southern California.

== Professional career ==
Gibson played in the NFL for the Tampa Bay Buccaneers and Indianapolis Colts between 2000 and 2003. He was a sixth round selection (193rd overall pick) in the 2000 NFL draft.
