= Chuck Darby =

American football player (born 1975)

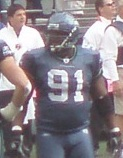
- Darby with the Seattle Seahawks in 2007

No. 93, 91
- Position: Defensive tackle

Personal information
- Born: October 22, 1975 (age 51); North, South Carolina, U.S.
- Listed height: 6 ft 0 in (1.83 m)
- Listed weight: 302 lb (137 kg)

Career information
- High school: North
- College: South Carolina State
- NFL draft: 1998: undrafted

Career history
- Baltimore Ravens (1998)*; Indianapolis Colts (1999)*; Carolina Panthers (1999)*; Barcelona Dragons (2000); Tampa Bay Buccaneers (2000–2004); Seattle Seahawks (2005–2007); Detroit Lions (2008–2009)
- * Offseason or practice squad member only

Awards and highlights
- Super Bowl champion (XXXVII)

Career NFL statistics
- Tackles: 208
- Sacks: 13.5
- Forced fumbles: 3
- Fumble recoveries: 5
- Stats at Pro Football Reference

Chartric "Chuck" Terrell Darby (/ˈtʃɑːrtrɪk/; born October 22, 1975) is an American former professional football player who was a defensive tackle in the National Football League (NFL). He was signed by the Tampa Bay Buccaneers as an undrafted free agent in 2001. He played college football for the South Carolina State Bulldogs under head coach Willie Jeffries.

Darby also played in the NFL for the Seattle Seahawks and Detroit Lions. He won a Super Bowl ring with the Buccaneers in Super Bowl XXXVII. With the Seahawks he played in Super Bowl XL as a starter.

== Early life ==
Darby attended North High School in North, South Carolina and was a student and a letterwinner in football. In football, he was a four-year letterman and was an All-State selection.
