= 2001 Chicago Bears season =

NFL team season

- Owner: Virginia Halas McCaskey
- General manager: Jerry Angelo
- Head coach: Dick Jauron
- Offensive coordinator: John Shoop
- Defensive coordinator: Greg Blache
- Home stadium: Soldier Field

Results
- Record: 13–3
- Division place: 1st NFC Central
- Playoffs: Lost Divisional Playoffs (vs. Eagles) 19–33
- Pro Bowlers: C Olin Kreutz; T James Williams; DT Ted Washington; LB Brian Urlacher; ST Larry Whigham

The 2001 Chicago Bears season was their 82nd regular season and 23rd postseason completed in the National Football League (NFL). The team finished with a 13–3 record under head coach Dick Jauron en route to an NFC Central title and the number two seed in the NFC, and the Bears' first playoff appearance since 1994. With former 1st-round pick Cade McNown being traded during training camp, the Bears were led by Jim Miller. The team had five comeback wins during the season, including two straight improbable wins where safety Mike Brown returned an interception for the game-winning touchdown in overtime. However, the Bears were upset at home by the Philadelphia Eagles 33–19 in the NFC Divisional playoffs.

== Offseason ==
Additions	Subtractions
DT Ted Washington (Bills)	DT Mike Wells (Colts)
TE Fred Baxter (Jets)	WR Eddie Kennison (Broncos)
FB Stanley Pritchett (Eagles)	DT Jim Flanigan (Packers)
QB Danny Wuerffel (Packers)	G Todd Perry (Dolphins)
TE John Davis (Vikings)	LB Barry Minter (Browns)
P Brad Maynard (Giants)	C Casey Wiegmann (Chiefs)
DT Keith Traylor (Broncos)	CB Thomas Smith (Colts)
FB Daimon Shelton (Jaguars)	WR Bobby Engram (Seahawks)
SS Larry Whigham (Patriots)	TE John Allred (Rams)
	LB Sean Harris (Colts)
	DB Ray McElroy (Lions)
	QB Cade McNown (Dolphins)

=== NFL draft ===
2001 Chicago Bears draft
Round	Pick	Player	Position	College	Notes
1	8	David Terrell	Wide receiver	Michigan	
2	38	Anthony Thomas	Running back	Michigan	
3	68	Mike Gandy	Offensive lineman	Notre Dame	
4	103	Karon Riley	Linebacker	Minnesota	
5	138	Bernard Robertson	Offensive lineman	Tulane	
7	208	John Capel	Wide receiver	Florida	
Made roster † Pro Football Hall of Fame * Made at least one Pro Bowl during career

=== Undrafted free agents ===
2001 undrafted free agents of note
Player	Position	College
Chris Brown	Tackle	Georgia Tech
Conrad Emmerich	Fullback	Northwestern
Rick Gilliam	Guard	West Virginia
Devin Lemons	Linebacker	Texas Tech
Chris Johnson	Fullback	Kansas State
David Mitchell	Cornerback	Ohio State
Vitaly Pisetsky	Kicker	Wisconsin
Garrett Soldano	Linebacker	Western Michigan
Ryan Ward	Tackle	New Hampshire
Sam Young	Cornerback	Illinois State

== Staff ==
2001 Chicago Bears staff
Front office: Chairman emeritus – Ed McCaskey; chairman of the board – Michael McCaskey; Secretary – Virginia Halas McCaskey; President and CEO – Ted Phillips; Vice president of player personnel – Mark Hatley; Director of college scouting – Greg Gabriel; Director of pro personnel – Bobby DePaul; Head coaches: Head coach – Dick Jauron; Offensive coaches: Offensive coordinator – John Shoop; Running backs – Earle Mosley; Wide receivers – Todd Haley; Tight ends – Pat Flaherty; Offensive line – Bob Wiley; Offensive quality control – Charlie Coiner	Defensive coaches: Defensive coordinator – Greg Blache; Defensive line – Rex Norris; Linebackers – Dale Lindsey; Defensive backs – Vance Bedford; Defensive quality control – Chuck Bullough; Special teams coaches: Special teams – Mike Sweatman; Strength and conditioning: Physical development coordinator – Russ Riederer; Assistant physical development coordinator – Steve Little

== Roster ==
2001 Chicago Bears roster
Quarterbacks (QB): 9 Shane Matthews; 15 Jim Miller; 17 Danny Wuerffel; Running backs (RB): 20 James Allen; 25 Autry Denson KR; 32 Leon Johnson KR/PR; 36 Stanley Pritchett FB; 31 Daimon Shelton FB; 35 Anthony Thomas; Wide receivers (WR): 87 D'Wayne Bates; 86 Marty Booker; 81 Ahmad Merritt; 83 David Terrell; 80 Dez White; Tight ends (TE): 84 Fred Baxter; 82 John Davis; 89 Dustin Lyman	Offensive linemen (OL): 78 Blake Brockermeyer T; 63 Damion Cook G/T; 73 Kevin Dogins C/G; 69 Mike Gandy G/T; 74 Jimmy Herndon T; 57 Olin Kreutz C; 60 Bernard Robertson T; 64 Rex Tucker G; 58 Chris Villarrial G; 71 James Williams T; Defensive linemen (DL): 70 Alfonso Boone DT; 93 Phillip Daniels DE; 72 Carl Powell DE/DT; 98 Bryan Robinson DE; 99 Joe Tafoya DE; 94 Keith Traylor NT; 92 Ted Washington DT	Linebackers (LB): 59 Rosevelt Colvin OLB; 53 Warrick Holdman OLB; 52 Bobbie Howard MLB; 55 Greg Jones LB; 95 Karon Riley OLB; 54 Brian Urlacher MLB; Defensive backs (DB): 39 Reggie Austin CB; 23 Jerry Azumah CB; 30 Mike Brown FS; 43 Mike Green SS; 27 Walt Harris CB; 26 Todd McMillon CB; 21 R. W. McQuarters CB/PR; 22 Than Merrill FS; 37 Tony Parrish SS; 33 Larry Whigham FS; Special teams (ST): 2 Paul Edinger K; 65 Patrick Mannelly LS; 4 Brad Maynard P	Practice squad: 46 Eric Johnson S; 97 Tim Johnson LB; 68 Devin Lemons LB; 76 Roshaun Matthews DE; 18 Willie Spencer WR; Reserve: 38 Brian Edwards RB (IR); 62 Robert Newkirk DT (IR); 88 Marcus Robinson WR (IR); 85 Kaseem Sinceno TE (IR); 29 Frankie Smith CB/S (IR); Rookies in italics 53 active, 5 reserve, 5 practice squad

== Season narrative ==
The Bears surprised most with a breakout campaign in 2001. After losing the opening game of the season to the Super Bowl XXXV Champion Baltimore Ravens 17–6 on the road, the Bears won their next six games, starting with a 17–10 victory against their division rival, the Minnesota Vikings in the Bears’ home opener. They carried their momentum through the Week 3 Bye and won on the road against the Atlanta Falcons (31–3).

The Bears returned home and won against the Arizona Cardinals 20–13. After a road shutout of the Cincinnati Bengals 24–0 the Bears played three home games. The first two games of this stretch were back-to-back overtime wins, first against the San Francisco 49ers (37–31), then against the Cleveland Browns (27–21). Both times safety Mike Brown capped remarkable comebacks (the Bears trailed 28–9 in the third quarter against San Francisco, and 21–7 with seconds remaining against Cleveland) by returning an interception in overtime for a touchdown.

Unfortunately the Green Bay Packers (their historic rival) buried the Bears’ win streak at home, 20–12. The Bears rebounded, winning their next three games. They first defeated then-division rival Tampa Bay 27–24. A season sweep of the Vikings (13–6) followed, then the Bears defended their turf against the Detroit Lions 13–10.

The Bears then traveled to Lambeau Field and were swept by the Packers 17–7. Once again the Bears rebounded, winning their last four games, against the Buccaneers at home (27–3), the Redskins (20–15), the Lions on the road (24–0), and then their season-finale against the Jacksonville Jaguars (33–13). The Bears ended the regular season with a 13–3 record.

The Bears entered the playoffs with the league's top defense (allowing a league-low 203 points), an offense ranked 11th in points scored (338 points), and a plus-13 turnover differential (4th in the league), but their magical season ended on a sour note, losing 33–19 to the Philadelphia Eagles in the divisional round of the NFC playoffs at Soldier Field.

== Schedule ==
Week	Date	Opponent	Result	Record	Venue	Attendance
1	September 9	at Baltimore Ravens	**L** 6–17	0–1	PSINet Stadium	69,365
2 (Note: The Bears were originally scheduled to host the Jacksonville Jaguars during Week 2 of the original NFL schedule (September 16) at Soldier Field. However, due to the September 11 attacks, the game was rescheduled to Week 17.)	September 23	**Minnesota Vikings**	**W** 17–10	1–1	Soldier Field	66,944
3	Bye					
4	October 7	at Atlanta Falcons	**W** 31–3	2–1	Georgia Dome	46,483
5	October 14	Arizona Cardinals	**W** 20–13	3–1	Soldier Field	66,944
6	October 21	at Cincinnati Bengals	**W** 24–0	4–1	Paul Brown Stadium	63,408
7	October 28	San Francisco 49ers	**W** 37–31 (OT)	5–1	Soldier Field	66,944
8	November 4	Cleveland Browns	**W** 27–21 (OT)	6–1	Soldier Field	66,944
9	November 11	**Green Bay Packers**	**L** 12–20	6–2	Soldier Field	66,944
10	November 18	at **Tampa Bay Buccaneers**	**W** 27–24	7–2	Raymond James Stadium	65,612
11	November 25	at **Minnesota Vikings**	**W** 13–6	8–2	Hubert H. Humphrey Metrodome	64,214
12	December 2	**Detroit Lions**	**W** 13–10	9–2	Soldier Field	66,944
13	December 9	at **Green Bay Packers**	**L** 7–17	9–3	Lambeau Field	59,869
14	December 16	**Tampa Bay Buccaneers**	**W** 27–3	10–3	Soldier Field	66,944
15	December 23	at Washington Redskins	**W** 20–15	11–3	FedExField	78,884
16	December 30	at **Detroit Lions**	**W** 24–0	12–3	Pontiac Silverdome	76,067
17	January 6	Jacksonville Jaguars	**W** 33–13	13–3	Soldier Field	66,944

Note: Intra-division opponents are in bold text.

== Game summaries ==
=== Week 1 ===
Team	1	2	3	4	Total
Bears	3	0	3	0	6
• Ravens	0	3	7	7	17

- Date: September 9
- Location: PSINet Stadium, Baltimore, Maryland
- Game start: 1:02 p.m. EST
- Elapsed time: 2:56
- Game weather: 83 °F (28.3 °C), wind 10 miles per hour (16 km/h; 8.7 kn), relative humidity 66%
- Referee: Joseph Rider
- TV announcers (Fox): Dick Stockton, Troy Aikman, Daryl Johnston, and Pam Oliver

Scoring summary
1	8:33	CHI	Paul Edinger 20-yard field goal	Bears 3–0
2	15:00	BAL	Matt Stover 37-yard field goal	3–3
3	5:30	CHI	Paul Edinger 46-yard field goal	Bears 6–3
3	13:12	BAL	Sam Gash 6-yard pass from Elvis Grbac (Matt Stover kick)	Ravens 10–6
4	12:24	BAL	Terry Allen 1 yard rush (Matt Stover kick)	Ravens 17–6

=== Week 2 ===
Team	1	2	3	4	Total
Vikings	3	0	7	0	10
• Bears	0	0	3	14	17

- Date: September 23
- Location: Soldier Field, Chicago, Illinois
- Game start: 12:00 p.m.
- Game weather: Rain 61 °F (16.1 °C) • Wind 9 miles per hour (14 km/h; 7.8 kn)
- Referee: Mike Carey
- TV announcers (Fox): Daryl Johnston, Troy Aikman, Dick Stockton, and Pam Oliver

Scoring summary
1	MIN	Gary Anderson 20-yard field goal	Vikings 3–0
3	MIN	Andrew Jordan 3-yard pass from Daunte Culpepper (Gary Anderson kick)	Vikings 7–3
3	CHI	Paul Edinger 45-yard field goal	Vikings 10–3
4	CHI	Marty Booker 15-yard pass from Jim Miller (Paul Edinger kick)	Tie 10–10
4	CHI	Marcus Robinson 24-yard pass from Jim Miller (Paul Edinger kick)	Bears 17–10

=== Week 4 ===
Team	1	2	3	4	Total
• Bears	0	10	0	21	31
Falcons	0	0	0	3	3

- Date: October 7
- Location: Georgia Dome, Atlanta, Georgia
- Game start: 1:00 p.m. EST
- Game weather: indoors (dome)
- Referee: Bill Carollo
- TV announcers (Fox): Ray Bentley, John Jurkovic, and Buck Lanford

Scoring summary
2	CHI	Marcus Robinson 34-yard pass from Marty Booker (Paul Edinger kick)	Bears 7–0
2	CHI	Paul Edinger 42-yard field goal	Bears 10–0
4	CHI	Marty Booker 63-yard pass from Jim Miller (Paul Edinger kick)	Bears 17–0
4	CHI	Brian Urlacher 90-yard fumble return (Paul Edinger kick)	Bears 24–0
4	ATL	Jay Feely 44-yard field goal	Bears 24–3
4	CHI	Anthony Thomas 32-yard run (Paul Edinger kick)	Bears 31–3

=== Week 5 ===
Team	1	2	3	4	Total
Cardinals	0	6	0	7	13
• Bears	3	10	7	0	20

- Date: October 14
- Location: Soldier Field, Chicago, Illinois
- Game start: 12:00 p.m.
- Game weather: 54 °F (12.2 °C) • Wind 11 miles per hour (18 km/h; 9.6 kn)
- Referee: Johnny Grier
- TV announcers (Fox): Curt Menefee, Brian Baldinger

Scoring summary
1	CHI	Paul Edinger 46-yard field goal	Bears 3–0
2	ARI	Bill Gramatica 40-yard field goal	Tie 3–3
2	CHI	James Allen 1-yard run (Paul Edinger kick)	Bears 10–3
2	ARI	Bill Gramatica 47-yard field goal	Bears 10–6
2	CHI	Paul Edinger 43-yard field goal	Bears 13–6
3	CHI	R. W. McQuarters 69-yard fumble return (Paul Edinger kick)	Bears 20–6
4	ARI	Frank Sanders 7-yard pass from Jake Plummer (Bill Gramatica kick)	Bears 20–13

=== Week 6 ===
Team	1	2	3	4	Total
• Bears	3	7	7	7	24
Bengals	0	0	0	0	0

- Date: October 21
- Location: Paul Brown Stadium, Cincinnati, Ohio
- Game start: 1:00 p.m.
- Game weather: 60 °F (15.6 °C) • Wind 8 miles per hour (13 km/h; 7.0 kn)
- Referee: Bernie Kukar
- TV announcers (Fox): Curt Menefee, Brian Baldinger, and Dan Jiggetts

Scoring summary
1	CHI	Paul Edinger 48-yard field goal	Bears 3–0
2	CHI	Fred Baxter 1-yard pass from Jim Miller (Paul Edinger kick)	Bears 10–0
3	CHI	Marty Booker 13-yard pass from Jim Miller (Paul Edinger kick)	Bears 17–0
4	CHI	Anthony Thomas 23-yard run (Paul Edinger kick)	Bears 24–0

=== Week 7 ===
Team	1	2	3	4	OT	Total
49ers	14	0	14	3	0	31
• Bears	0	9	7	15	6	37

- Date: October 28
- Location: Soldier Field, Chicago, Illinois
- Game start: 12:00 p.m.
- Game weather: 40 °F (4.4 °C), wind 12 miles per hour (19 km/h; 10 kn)
- Referee: Dick Hantak
- TV announcers (Fox): Kenny Albert, Tim Green, and Dan Jiggetts

Scoring summary
1		SF	Julian Peterson 26-yard fumble return (Jose Cortez kick)	49ers 7–0
1		SF	Justin Swift 1-yard pass from Jeff Garcia (Jose Cortez kick)	49ers 14–0
2		CHI	Safety, ball fumbled out of end zone	49ers 14–2
2		CHI	Daimon Shelton 3-yard pass from Shane Matthews (Paul Edinger kick)	49ers 14–9
3		SF	Garrison Hearst 60-yard pass from Jeff Garcia (Jose Cortez kick)	49ers 21–9
3		SF	Zack Bronson 97-yard interception return (Jose Cortez kick)	49ers 28–9
3		CHI	Anthony Thomas 19-yard run (Paul Edinger kick)	49ers 28–16
4		SF	Jose Cortez 40-yard field goal	49ers 31–16
4		CHI	David Terrell 13-yard pass from Shane Matthews (Paul Edinger kick)	49ers 31–23
4		CHI	David Terrell 4-yard pass from Shane Matthews (Anthony Thomas run)	Tie 31–31
OT	14:44	CHI	Mike Brown 33-yard interception return	Bears 37–31

The Bears trailed the 49ers 28–9 in the third quarter. The Bears would score 22 unanswered points after Shane Matthews threw two touchdown passes to David Terrell in the last four minutes to tie the game 31–31. The 49ers won the coin toss and elected to receive. On the first play of overtime, quarterback Jeff Garcia threw a pass to Terrell Owens which Owens bobbled it out of his hands and was intercepted by Mike Brown. Brown would return the ball all the way for a walk-off pick six to win the game for the Bears 37–31.

=== Week 8 ===
Team	1	2	3	4	OT	Total
Browns	7	0	14	0	0	21
• Bears	0	7	0	14	6	27

- Date: November 4
- Location: Soldier Field, Chicago, Illinois
- Game start: 3:15 p.m. (originally scheduled for 12:00 pm)
- Elapsed time: 3:20
- Game attendance: 66,944
- Game weather: 53 °F (11.7 °C), wind 8 miles per hour (13 km/h; 7.0 kn)
- Referee: Gerald Austin
- TV announcers (CBS): Greg Gumbel, Phil Simms, and Armen Keteyian

Scoring summary
1		CLE	Courtney Brown 25-yard fumble return (Phil Dawson kick)	Browns 7–0
2		CHI	Anthony Thomas 2-yard run (Paul Edinger kick)	Tie 7–7
3		CLE	Mike Sellers 3-yard pass from Tim Couch (Phil Dawson kick)	Browns 14–7
3		CLE	Kevin Johnson 55-yard pass from Tim Couch (Phil Dawson kick)	Browns 21–7
4		CHI	Marty Booker 9-yard pass from Shane Matthews (Paul Edinger kick)	Browns 21–14
4		CHI	James Allen 34-yard pass from Shane Matthews (Paul Edinger kick)	Tie 21–21
OT	12:10	CHI	Mike Brown 16-yard interception return	Bears 27–21

The Bears trailed the Browns 21–7 with 30 seconds left in the game. The Bears were able to score 14 points in those 30 seconds after Shane Matthews threw a touchdown pass to Marty Booker, Bears get the onside kick, and Matthews throwing a Hail Mary that got tipped up in the air and somehow caught in the endzone by James Allen for a touchdown. The game would go into Overtime for the second game in a row for the Bears. The Bears won the coin toss but had to punt it to the Browns. On the Browns' third play of their drive, Tim Couch threw a pass that was batted up in the air by Bryan Robinson and fell into the hands of Mike Brown who would return it for a game winning pick six. Brown became the first and currently only player in NFL history to have back-to-back games with a game winning pick six in overtime.

=== Week 9 ===
Team	1	2	3	4	Total
• Packers	0	10	7	3	20
Bears	6	3	3	0	12

- Date: November 11
- Location: Soldier Field, Chicago, IL
- Game start: 1:02 p.m.
- Elapsed time: 2:59
- Game attendance: 66,944
- Game weather: 48 °F (8.9 °C); wind 8 miles per hour (13 km/h; 7.0 kn)
- Referee: Ed Hochuli
- TV announcers (Fox): Dick Stockton, Troy Aikman, Daryl Johnston, and Pam Oliver

Scoring summary
Q1	7:52	CHI	Paul Edinger 37-yard field goal	CHI 3–0
Q1	13:33	CHI	Paul Edinger 47-yard field goal	CHI 6–0
Q2	5:27	GNB	Ryan Longwell 40-yard field goal	CHI 6–3
Q2	14:15	GNB	Bill Schroeder 41-yard pass from Brett Favre (Ryan Longwell kick)	GNB 10–6
Q2	15:00	CHI	Paul Edinger 37-yard field goal	GNB 10–9
Q3	7:55	GNB	Antonio Freeman 9-yard pass from Brett Favre (Ryan Longwell kick)	GNB 17–9
Q3	11:02	CHI	Paul Edinger 41-yard field goal	GNB 17–12
Q4	7:37	GNB	Ryan Longwell 31-yard field goal	GNB 20–12

=== Week 10 ===
Team	1	2	3	4	Total
• Bears	0	7	17	3	27
Buccaneers	3	6	0	15	24

- Date: November 18
- Location: Raymond James Stadium, Tampa, Florida
- Game start: 4:15 p.m.
- Elapsed time: 3:18
- Game attendance: 65,612
- Game weather: 80 °F (26.7 °C), relative humidity 56%. wind 10 miles per hour (16 km/h; 8.7 kn)
- Referee: Tony Corrente
- TV announcers (Fox): Pat Summerall, John Madden, and Ron Pitts

Scoring summary
Q1	12:31	TAM	Martin Gramatica 25-yard field goal	TAM 3–0
Q2	1:11	TAM	Martin Gramatica 38-yard field goal	TAM 6–0
Q2	6:39	CHI	Marty Booker 28-yard pass from Jim Miller (Paul Edinger kick)	CHI 7–6
Q2	14:37	TAM	Martin Gramatica 26-yard field goal	TAM 9–7
Q3	3:57	CHI	Marty Booker 44-yard pass from Jim Miller (Paul Edinger kick)	CHI 14–9
Q3	5:37	CHI	Marty Booker 66-yard pass from Jim Miller (Paul Edinger kick)	CHI 21–9
Q3	10:59	CHI	Paul Edinger 26-yard field goal	CHI 24–9
Q4	2:35	TAM	Mike Alstott 1 yard rush (Martin Gramatica kick)	CHI 24–16
Q4	8:01	CHI	Paul Edinger 40-yard field goal	CHI 27–16
Q4	12:31	TAM	Brad Johnson 1 yard rush (Mike Alstott pass from Johnson)	CHI 27–24

=== Week 11 ===
Team	1	2	3	4	Total
• Bears	0	10	0	3	13
Vikings	0	0	3	3	6

- Date: November 25
- Location: Hubert H. Humphrey Metrodome, Minneapolis, Minnesota
- Game start: 8:35 p.m.
- Elapsed time: 3:09
- Game attendance: 64,214
- Game weather: None (domed stadium)
- Referee: Johnny Grier
- TV announcers (ESPN): Mike Patrick, Joe Theismann, Paul Maguire, and Suzy Kolber

Scoring summary
Q2	5:17	CHI	Leon Johnson 1 yard rush (Paul Edinger kick)	CHI 7–0
Q2	14:16	CHI	Paul Edinger 30-yard field goal	CHI 10–0
Q3	7:08	MIN	Gary Anderson 44-yard field goal	CHI 10–3
Q4	1:31	CHI	Paul Edinger 43-yard field goal	CHI 13–3
Q4	11:43	MIN	Gary Anderson 44-yard field goal	CHI 13–6

=== Week 12 ===
Team	1	2	3	4	Total
Lions	7	0	3	0	10
• Bears	0	3	0	10	13

- Date: December 2
- Location: Soldier Field, Chicago, IL
- Game start: 1:03 p.m.
- Elapsed time: 3:14
- Game attendance: 66,944
- Game weather: 51 °F (10.6 °C); wind 13 miles per hour (21 km/h; 11 kn)
- Referee: Terry McAulay
- TV announcers (Fox): Curt Menefee, Brian Baldinger

Scoring summary
Q1	14:35	DET	James Stewart 3-yard rush (Jason Hanson kick)	DET 7–0
Q2	3:13	CHI	Paul Edinger 46-yard field goal	DET 7–3
Q3	8:46	DET	Jason Hanson 36-yard field goal	DET 10–3
Q4	0:59	CHI	Paul Edinger 26-yard field goal	DET 10–6
Q4	9:26	CHI	Leon Johnson 1 yard rush (Paul Edinger kick)	CHI 13–10

After the winless Lions controlled play for most of the first half, Detroit kicker Jason Hanson missed three relatively easy field goals and the Bears recovered their offense for a come-behind victory. The win moved the Bears to 9–2 and left the Lions at 0–11 and looking down the barrel of the first 0–16 season in NFL history.

=== Week 13 ===
Team	1	2	3	4	Total
Bears	0	0	7	0	7
• Packers	7	0	7	3	17

- Date: December 9
- Location: Lambeau Field, Green Bay, Wisconsin
- Game start: 1:02 p.m. EST
- Elapsed time: 3:02
- Game attendance: 59,869
- Game weather: 33 °F (0.6 °C), wind 12 miles per hour (19 km/h; 10 kn), humidity 63%, wind chill 22 °F or −5.6 °C
- Referee: Ron Winter
- TV announcers (Fox): Dick Stockton, Troy Aikman, Daryl Johnston, and Pam Oliver

Scoring summary
Q1	4:29	GNB	Antonio Freeman 3-yard pass from Brett Favre (Ryan Longwell kick)	GNB 7–0
Q3	1:19	CHI	Anthony Thomas 19-yard rush (Paul Edinger kick)	7–7
Q3	12:00	GNB	Ahman Green 12-yard rush (Ryan Longwell kick)	GNB 14–7
Q4	2:20	GNB	Ryan Longwell 27-yard field goal	GNB 17–7

=== Week 14 ===
Team	1	2	3	4	Total
Buccaneers	0	3	0	0	3
• Bears	3	10	7	7	27

- Date: December 16
- Location: Soldier Field, Chicago, Illinois
- Game start: 1:02 p.m.
- Elapsed time: 3:04
- Game attendance: 66,944
- Game weather: 45 °F (7.2 °C); wind 10 miles per hour (16 km/h; 8.7 kn)
- Referee: Bob McElwee
- TV announcers (Fox): Pat Summerall, John Madden, and Ron Pitts

Scoring summary
Q1	9:17	CHI	Paul Edinger 30-yard field goal	CHI 3–0
Q2	7:10	TAM	Martin Gramatica 25-yard field goal	3–3
Q2	10:24	CHI	Marty Booker 2-yard pass from Jim Miller (Paul Edinger kick)	CHI 10–3
Q2	15:00	CHI	Paul Edinger 46-yard field goal	CHI 13–3
Q3	6:49	CHI	Fred Baxter 18-yard pass from Jim Miller (Paul Edinger kick)	CHI 20–3
Q4	3:35	CHI	Anthony Thomas 5-yard rush (Paul Edinger kick)	CHI 27–3

=== Week 15 ===
Team	1	2	3	4	Total
• Bears	3	7	0	10	20
Redskins	7	3	3	2	15

- Date: December 23
- Location: FedEx Field, Landover, Maryland
- Game start: 1:01 p.m. EST
- Elapsed time: 3:08
- Game attendance: 78,884
- Game weather: 51 °F (10.6 °C), wind 14 miles per hour (23 km/h; 12 kn), humidity 43%
- Referee: Ed Hochuli
- TV announcers (Fox): Dick Stockton, Troy Aikman, Daryl Johnston, and Pam Oliver

Scoring summary
Q1	4:32	CHI	Paul Edinger 39-yard field goal	CHI 3–0
Q1	10:21	WAS	Stephen Davis 3-yard rush (Brett Conway kick)	WAS 7–3
Q2	0:08	CHI	Leon Johnson 32-yard rush (Paul Edinger kick)	CHI 10–7
Q2	7:10	WAS	Brett Conway 34-yard field goal	10–10
Q3	10:06	WAS	Brett Conway 26-yard field goal	WAS 13–10
Q4	5:05	CHI	Brian Urlacher 27-yard pass from Brad Maynard (Paul Edinger kick)	CHI 17–13
Q4	11:37	CHI	Paul Edinger 37-yard field goal	CHI 20–13
Q4	15:00	WAS	Safety, Brad Maynard runs out of end zone	CHI 20–15

=== Week 16 ===
Team	1	2	3	4	Total
• Bears	14	3	0	7	24
Lions	0	0	0	0	0

- Date: December 30
- Location: Pontiac Silverdome, Pontiac, Michigan
- Game start: 1:03 p.m.
- Elapsed time: 3:09
- Game attendance: 76,067
- Game weather: None (domed stadium)
- Referee: Tony Corrente
- TV announcers (Fox): Curt Menefee, Brian Baldinger, and Jennifer Hammond

Scoring summary
Q1	2:42	CHI	D'Wayne Bates 28-yard pass from Jim Miller (Paul Edinger kick)	CHI 7–0
Q1	10:06	CHI	David Terrell 20-yard pass from Jim Miller (Paul Edinger kick)	CHI 14–0
Q2	9:13	CHI	Paul Edinger 38-yard field goal	CHI 17–0
Q4	13:48	CHI	Walt Harris 39-yard interception return (Paul Edinger kick)	CHI 24–0

=== Week 17 ===
Jacksonville Jaguars (6–9) at Chicago Bears (12–3)

Quarter	1	2	3	4	Total
Jaguars	0	0	6	7	13
Bears	3	10	10	10	33

at Soldier Field • Chicago, Illinois

- Date: January 6, 2002
- Game time: 12:00 p.m. (Originally scheduled for 3:15 p.m. on September 16, 2001)
- Game weather: Partly Cloudy; 37 °F (3 °C); wind 14
- Game attendance: 66,944
- Referee: Dick Hantak
- TV announcers (CBS): Dick Enberg, Dan Dierdorf, and Bonnie Bernstein, original announcers for September 16, 2001: Gus Johnson, Brent Jones, Sam Wyche
- Pro-Football-Reference.com

Game information

Jaguars

- Mark Brunell
  19/36, 189 Yds, 2 TD, 3 INT
- Stacey Mack
  11 Rush, 66 Yds
- Keenan McCardell
  9 Rec, 93 Yds, TD

Bears

- Jim Miller
  19/28, 159 Yds, TD
- Anthony Thomas
  33 Rush, 160 Yds, TD
- D'Wayne Bates
  4 Rec, 50 Yds

Scoring summary

Quarter	Time	Drive			Team	Scoring information	Score	
Quarter	Time	Plays	Yards	TOP	Team	Scoring information	JAX	CHI
1	2:42				Bears	47-yard field goal by Edinger	0	3
2	1:17				Bears	Leon Johnson 2-yard touchdown run, Edinger kick good	0	10
2	0:00				Bears	23-yard field goal by Edinger	0	13
3	9:40				Bears	Terrell 9-yard touchdown reception from Miller, Edinger kick good	0	20
3	6:59				Jaguars	McCardell 15-yard touchdown reception from Brunell, Hollis kick no good	6	20
3	1:52				Bears	25-yard field goal by Edinger	6	23
4	12:56				Bears	22-yard field goal by Edinger	6	26
4	7:37				Bears	Thomas 2-yard touchdown run, Edinger kick good	6	33
4	3:50				Jaguars	Smith 3-yard touchdown reception from Brunell, Holmes kick good	13	33
"TOP" = time of possession. For other American football terms, see Glossary of American football.							13	33

The game's biggest highlight was defensive tackle Keith Traylor intercepting a Mark Brunell pass and returning it 67 yards setting up a David Terrell touchdown in the third quarter. With the win, the Bears clinched the NFC Central for the first time since 1990.

== Standings ==
NFC Central
	W	L	T	PCT	PF	PA	STK
^{(2)} Chicago Bears	13	3	0	.813	338	203	W4
^{(4)} Green Bay Packers	12	4	0	.750	390	266	W3
^{(6)} Tampa Bay Buccaneers	9	7	0	.563	324	280	L1
Minnesota Vikings	5	11	0	.313	290	390	L4
Detroit Lions	2	14	0	.125	270	424	W1

== Playoffs ==
Week	Date	Opponent	Result
Divisional	January 19, 2002	Philadelphia Eagles	L 19–33

Team	1	2	3	4	Total
• Eagles	6	7	7	13	33
Bears	0	7	7	5	19

- Date: Saturday January 19, 2002
- Location: Soldier Field
- Game start: 3:37
- Elapsed time: 2:58
- Game attendance: 66,944
- Game weather: 31 °F (−0.6 °C), wind 8 miles per hour (13 km/h; 7.0 kn), wind chill 19 °F or −7.2 °C
- Referee: Bill Carollo
- TV announcers (Fox): Dick Stockton, Troy Aikman, Daryl Johnston, and Pam Oliver

Scoring summary
Q1	9:04	PHI	Akers 34-yard field goal	PHI 3–0
Q1	3:22	PHI	Akers 23-yard field goal	PHI 6–0
Q2	5:29	CHI	Merritt 47-yard run (Edinger kick)	CHI 7–6
Q2	0:14	PHI	Martin 13-yard pass from McNabb (Akers kick)	PHI 13–7
Q3	12:25	CHI	Azumah 39-yard interception return (Edinger kick)	CHI 14–13
Q3	5:55	PHI	Staley 6-yard pass from McNabb (Akers kick)	PHI 20-14
Q4	14:16	CHI	Edinger 38-yard field goal	PHI 20–17
Q4	8:48	PHI	Akers 40-yard field goal	PHI 23–17
Q4	6:28	PHI	Akers 46-yard field goal	PHI 26–17
Q4	3:21	PHI	McNabb 5-yard run (Akers kick)	PHI 33–17
Q4	0:00	CHI	Safety	PHI 33–19
