= 2002 Chicago Bears season =

NFL team season

- Owner: The McCaskey Family
- General manager: Jerry Angelo
- Head coach: Dick Jauron
- Home stadium: Memorial Stadium (Champaign, Illinois)

Results
- Record: 4–12
- Division place: 3rd NFC North
- Playoffs: Did not qualify
- All-Pros: LB Brian Urlacher (1st team)
- Pro Bowlers: Marty Booker; Olin Kreutz; Brian Urlacher

The 2002 season was the Chicago Bears' 83rd in the National Football League (NFL) and their fourth under head coach Dick Jauron.

The team had hopes of returning to the playoffs after an unexpected 13–3 season the previous year, However, the team failed to improve on that record and finished with a 4–12 record and missed the postseason for the second time in three years. The Bears had problems on both sides of the ball, finishing 27th in the league in points scored and 23rd in points allowed. The Bears began the season 2–0, but things quickly fell apart as the team fell into an eight-game losing streak, including a loss at home to the New England Patriots where, despite having a 27–6 lead at some point, the Patriots came back and won the game late in the fourth quarter. After this, the Bears never recovered, finishing 4–12 and in third place in their division, the newly aligned NFC North.

With Soldier Field being rebuilt, the Bears opted to play all of their home games Downstate in Champaign, at Memorial Stadium on the campus of the University of Illinois. The arrangement was similar to the one made by the newly relocated Tennessee Oilers five years earlier, in that the Bears continued to be based in Chicago and travelled to Champaign (a two-hour drive to the southwest) only for games, essentially consigning themselves to playing sixteen games on the road. This was the first time since their move out of Wrigley Field that they didn't play home games at Soldier Field.

While (unlike the 1997 Oilers) the venture was reasonably successful at the box office, with the Bears drawing more than 50,000 fans to every game in Champaign and more than 60,000 to all but two games, the Bears never seemed to get used to their "new" home field. Injuries piled up as the season went on for both offense and defense. Starting quarterback Jim Miller was injured throughout the year, leaving the team no choice but to use backup Chris Chandler and rookie third-string quarterback Henry Burris for both spot relief and as starters. 2001 NFL Offensive Rookie of the Year Anthony Thomas suffered a broken right index finger in Week 15 against the Green Bay Packers. These injuries and the league's 23rd worst turnover differential contributed to the team's franchise record-tying eight-game losing streak and their poor record.

== Offseason ==
Additions	Subtractions
QB Chris Chandler (Falcons)	QB Shane Matthews (Redskins)
DB Damon Moore (Eagles)	RB James Allen (Texans)
LB Mike Caldwell (Eagles)	WR D'Wayne Bates (Vikings)
DT Christian Peter (Colts)	T Blake Brockermeyer (Broncos)
	CB Walt Harris (Colts)
	FS Tony Parrish (49ers)

=== 2002 expansion draft ===
Chicago Bears selected during the expansion draft
Round	Overall	Name	Position	Expansion team
—	17	Danny Wuerffel	Quarterback	Houston Texans

=== Draft ===
2002 Chicago Bears draft
Round	Pick	Player	Position	College	Notes
1	29	Marc Colombo	Offensive tackle	Boston College	
3	72	Roosevelt Williams	Cornerback	Tuskegee	
3	93	Terrence Metcalf	Guard	Ole Miss	
4	104	Alex Brown	Defensive end	Florida	
5	140	Bobby Gray	Safety	Louisiana Tech	
5	165	Bryan Knight	Linebacker	Pittsburgh	
6	199	Adrian Peterson	Running back	Georgia Southern	
6	203	Jamin Elliott	Wide receiver	Delaware	
6	210	Bryan Fletcher	Tight end	UCLA	
Made roster † Pro Football Hall of Fame * Made at least one Pro Bowl during career

=== Undrafted free agents ===
2002 undrafted free agents of note
Player	Position	College
Luke Butkus	Center	Illinois
Travis Coleman	Defensive back	Hampton
Mike Collins	Guard	Wake Forest
Curry Dawson	Defensive tackle	Angelo State
Jerris Evans	Wide receiver	Missouri Western State
Steve Fitts	Punter	Illinois
Jeff Grzeskowiak	Tackle	Akron
Maurice Hicks	Running back	North Carolina A&T
Rodney Jones	Defensive tackle	UAB
Kiah Johnson	Linebacker	Texas A&M–Kingsville
Brad Lewis	Quarterback	West Virginia
Tony Lukins	Cornerback	New Mexico State
Eric McCoo	Running back	Penn State
Edell Shepherd	Wide receiver	San Jose State
Adrian Singleton	Safety	UAB
Dave Volk	Tackle	Nebraska

=== Training camp ===
2002 marked the first Bears Training Camp at Olivet Nazarene University in Bourbonnais, Illinois, after practicing at University of Wisconsin–Platteville from 1984 to 2001. Other candidates in the selection process included universities like Eastern Illinois in Charleston, Illinois State in Normal, Millikin in Decatur, Northern Illinois in DeKalb, Southern Illinois Carbondale and Edwardsville, and Urbana–Champaign; smaller schools like Knox College in Galesburg, Monmouth College in Monmouth, and Rockford College in Rockford; and the Chanute Air Force Base near Rantoul, where the Illinois Fighting Illini held their offseason camps.

The list was eventually narrowed to Eastern Illinois, Millikin, Northern Illinois, and Olivet Nazarene. On July 17, 2001, the Bears announced Olivet Nazarene as the new Training Camp site on a two-year deal.

== Staff ==
2002 Chicago Bears staff
Front office: Chairman emeritus – Ed McCaskey; chairman of the board – Michael McCaskey; Secretary – Virginia Halas McCaskey; President and CEO – Ted Phillips; Vice president of player personnel – Mark Hatley; Director of college scouting – Greg Gabriel; Director of pro personnel – Bobby DePaul; Head coaches: Head coach – Dick Jauron; Offensive coaches: Offensive coordinator – John Shoop; Running backs – Earle Mosley; Wide receivers – Todd Haley; Tight ends – Pat Flaherty; Offensive line – Bob Wylie; Offensive quality control – Charlie Coiner	Defensive coaches: Defensive coordinator – Greg Blache; Defensive line – Rex Norris; Linebackers – Gary Moeller; Defensive backs – Vance Bedford; Defensive quality control – Chuck Bullough; Special teams coaches: Special teams – Mike Sweatman; Strength and conditioning: Physical development coordinator – Russ Riederer; Assistant physical development coordinator – Steve Little

== Roster ==
2002 Chicago Bears roster
Quarterbacks (QB): 10 Henry Burris; 12 Chris Chandler; 17 Cory Sauter; Running backs (RB): 27 Rabih Abdullah KR; 32 Leon Johnson; 29 Adrian Peterson; 36 Stanley Pritchett FB; 31 Daimon Shelton FB; Wide receivers (WR): 86 Marty Booker; 87 Jamin Elliott; 81 Ahmad Merritt; 88 Marcus Robinson; 80 Dez White; Tight ends (TE): 82 John Davis; 85 John Gilmore	Offensive linemen (OL): 73 Kevin Dogins C/G; 79 Steve Edwards G/T; 67 Mike Gandy G/T; 78 Aaron Gibson G/T; 57 Olin Kreutz C; 60 Terrence Metcalf G/T; 74 Bernard Robertson T; 58 Chris Villarrial G; 67 Josh Warner C/G; 71 James Williams T; Defensive linemen (DL): 70 Alfonso Boone DT; 96 Alex Brown DE; 93 Phillip Daniels DE; 72 Ernest Grant DT; 97 Christian Peter DT; 98 Bryan Robinson DE/DT; 76 Bobby Setzer DE; 95 John Stamper DE; 99 Joe Tafoya DE; 94 Keith Traylor NT	Linebackers (LB): 55 Mike Caldwell OLB; 49 Marq Cerqua MLB; 59 Rosevelt Colvin OLB; 52 Bobbie Howard OLB; 90 Bryan Knight OLB; 54 Brian Urlacher MLB; Defensive backs (DB): 23 Jerry Azumah CB; 30 Mike Brown FS; 39 Travis Coleman CB; 43 Mike Green SS; 38 Eric Joyce CB; 21 R. W. McQuarters CB; 37 Damon Moore FS; 33 Larry Whigham LB/S; 20 Roosevelt Williams CB; Special teams (ST): 2 Paul Edinger K; 65 Patrick Mannelly LS; 4 Brad Maynard P	Practice squad: 63 Chris Demaree DE; 45 Tyree Foreman FB; 47 Teddy Gaines CB; 68 Shane Grice G; 84 Bryan Fletcher TE; 16 Edell Shepherd WR (IR); Reserve: 24 Reggie Austin CB (IR); 75 Marc Colombo T (IR); 25 Bobby Gray S (IR); 22 Maurice Hicks RB (NF-Inj.); 53 Warrick Holdman LB (IR); 89 Dustin Lyman TE (IR); 91 Roshaun Matthews DE (PUP); 26 Todd McMillon CB (IR); 15 Jim Miller QB (IR); 83 David Terrell WR (IR); 35 Anthony Thomas RB (IR); 64 Rex Tucker T (IR); 92 Ted Washington DT (IR); Rookies in italics 53 active, 14 reserve, 5 practice squad

== Preseason ==
Week	Date	Opponent	Result	Record	Venue	NFL.com recap
1	August 10	Denver Broncos	L 3–27	0–1	Memorial Stadium	Summary
2	August 16	St. Louis Rams	W 19–17	1–1	Edward Jones Dome	Summary
3	August 23	Jacksonville Jaguars	L 16–24	1–2	Memorial Stadium	Summary
4	August 29	Miami Dolphins	L 22–24	1–3	Pro Player Stadium	Summary

== Regular season ==
=== Schedule ===
Week	Date	Opponent	Result	Record	Venue	NFL.com recap
1	September 8	Minnesota Vikings	W 27–23	1–0	Memorial Stadium	Summary
2	September 15	at Atlanta Falcons	W 14–13	2–0	Georgia Dome	Summary
3	September 22	New Orleans Saints	L 23–29	2–1	Memorial Stadium	Summary
4	September 29	at Buffalo Bills	L 27–33 (OT)	2–2	Ralph Wilson Stadium	Summary
5	October 7	Green Bay Packers	L 21–34	2–3	Memorial Stadium	Summary
6	Bye					
7	October 20	at Detroit Lions	L 20–23 (OT)	2–4	Ford Field	Summary
8	October 27	at Minnesota Vikings	L 7–25	2–5	Hubert H. Humphrey Metrodome	Summary
9	November 3	Philadelphia Eagles	L 13–19	2–6	Memorial Stadium	Summary
10	November 10	New England Patriots	L 30–33	2–7	Memorial Stadium	Summary
11	November 18	at St. Louis Rams	L 16–21	2–8	Edward Jones Dome	Summary
12	November 24	Detroit Lions	W 20–17 (OT)	3–8	Memorial Stadium	Summary
13	December 1	at Green Bay Packers	L 20–30	3–9	Lambeau Field	Summary
14	December 9	at Miami Dolphins	L 9–27	3–10	Pro Player Stadium	Summary
15	December 15	New York Jets	W 20–13	4–10	Memorial Stadium	Summary
16	December 22	at Carolina Panthers	L 14–24	4–11	Ericsson Stadium	Summary
17	December 29	Tampa Bay Buccaneers	L 0–15	4–12	Memorial Stadium	Summary

=== Game summaries ===
==== Week 1: vs. Minnesota Vikings ====
Week 1: Minnesota Vikings (0–0) at Chicago Bears (0–0) – Game summary

Quarter	1	2	3	4	Total
Vikings	3	17	0	3	23
Bears	7	3	3	14	27

at Memorial Stadium, Champaign, Illinois

- Date: September 8, 2002
- Game time: 1:00 p.m.
- Game weather: Partly Cloudy, 85 °F (29 °C)
- Game attendance: 63,226
- Referee: Mike Carey (94)
- TV announcers (FOX): Sam Rosen, Bill Maas, and Dan Jiggetts
- Recap, Game Book

Game information

First quarter

- MIN – Doug Brien 30-yard field goal, 6:15. Vikings 3–0. Drive: 7 plays, 44 yards, 3:18.
- CHI – Marty Booker 29-yard pass from Jim Miller (Paul Edinger kick), 1:03. Bears 7–3. Drive: 3 plays, 29 yards, 1:31.

Second quarter

- MIN – Daunte Culpepper 2-yard run (Doug Brien kick), 13:32. Vikings 10–7. Drive: 6 plays, 81 yards, 2:31.
- CHI – Paul Edinger 49-yard field goal, 9:19. Tied 10–10. Drive: 9 plays, 49 yards, 4:13.
- MIN – Doug Brien 22-yard field goal, 3:30. Vikings 13–10. Drive: 11 plays, 69 yards, 5:49.
- MIN – Randy Moss 33-yard pass from Daunte Culpepper (Doug Brien kick), 0:55. Vikings 20–10. Drive: 1 play, 33 yards, 0:06.

Third quarter

- CHI – Paul Edinger 49-yard field goal, 10:28. Vikings 20–13. Drive: 10 plays, 39 yards, 4:32.

Fourth quarter

- MIN – Doug Brien 42-yard field goal, 9:07. Vikings 23–13. Drive: 9 plays, 43 yards, 4:24.
- CHI – Anthony Thomas 1-yard run (Paul Edinger kick), 6:13. Vikings 23–20. Drive: 5 plays, 78 yards, 2:54.
- CHI – David Terrell 9-yard pass from Jim Miller (Paul Edinger kick), 0:28. Bears 27–23. Drive: 8 plays, 51 yards, 2:06.

Top passers

- MIN – Daunte Culpepper – 16/28, 234 yards, TD, 2 INT
- CHI – Jim Miller – 20/33, 297 yards, 2 TD, INT

Top rushers

- MIN – Michael Bennett – 16 rushes, 53 yards
- CHI – Anthony Thomas – 19 rushes, 45 yards, TD

Top receivers

- MIN – Randy Moss – 6 receptions, 58 yards, TD
- CHI – Marty Booker – 8 receptions, 198 yards, TD

==== Week 2: at Atlanta Falcons ====
Week 2: Chicago Bears (1–0) at Atlanta Falcons (0–1) – Game summary

Quarter	1	2	3	4	Total
Bears	0	7	7	0	14
Falcons	0	10	3	0	13

at Georgia Dome, Atlanta, Georgia

- Date: September 15, 2002
- Game time: 1:00 pm
- Game weather: None (indoor stadium)
- Game attendance: 68,081
- Referee: Jeff Triplette (42)
- TV announcers (FOX): Pat Summerall, Brian Baldinger, and Buck Lanford
- Recap, Game Book

Game information

First quarter

- No scoring plays.

Second quarter

- ATL – Warrick Dunn 10-yard pass from Michael Vick (Jay Feely kick), 11:33. Falcons 7–0. Drive: 8 plays, 38 yards, 4:00.
- CHI – Anthony Thomas 3-yard run (Paul Edinger kick), 1:10. Tied 7–7. Drive: 10 plays, 86 yards, 5:04.
- ATL – Jay Feely 37-yard field goal, 0:00. Falcons 10–7. Drive: 6 plays, 55 yards, 1:10.

Third quarter

- CHI – David Terrell 14-yard pass from Jim Miller (Paul Edinger kick), 9:27. Bears 14–10. Drive: 3 plays, 16 yards, 0:55.
- ATL – Jay Feely 27-yard field goal, 6:08. Bears 14–13. Drive: 7 plays, 14 yards, 3:19.

Fourth quarter

- No scoring plays.

Top passers

- CHI – Jim Miller – 12/24, 143 yards, TD, INT
- ATL – Michael Vick – 17/28, 166 yards, TD

Top rushers

- CHI – Anthony Thomas – 26 rushes, 84 yards, TD
- ATL – Michael Vick – 10 rushes, 56 yards

Top receivers

- CHI – Marty Booker – 5 receptions, 48 yards
- ATL – Brian Finneran – 6 receptions, 76 yards

==== Week 3: vs. New Orleans Saints ====
Week 3: New Orleans Saints (2–0) at Chicago Bears (2–0) – Game summary

Quarter	1	2	3	4	Total
Saints	0	14	7	8	29
Bears	10	10	0	3	23

at Memorial Stadium, Champaign, Illinois

- Date: September 22, 2002
- Game time: 1:00 p.m.
- Game weather: Partly Cloudy, 68 °F (20 °C)
- Game attendance: 63,216
- Referee: Ron Blum (7)
- TV announcers (FOX): Kenny Albert, Tim Green, and Dan Jiggetts
- Recap, Game Book

Game information

First quarter

- CHI – Paul Edinger 31-yard field goal, 7:36. Bears 3–0. Drive: 10 plays, 38 yards, 4:01.
- CHI – Dez White 10-yard pass from Jim Miller (Paul Edinger kick), 2:47. Bears 10–0. Drive: 6 plays, 52 yards, 3:10.

Second quarter

- CHI – Marty Booker 22-yard pass from Jim Miller (Paul Edinger kick), 13:35. Bears 17–0. Drive: 6 plays, 56 yards, 3:05.
- CHI – Paul Edinger 25-yard field goal, 11:47. Bears 20–0. Drive: 4 plays, 6 yards, 1:30.
- NO – Jerome Pathon 16-yard pass from Aaron Brooks (John Carney kick), 7:21. Bears 20–7. Drive: 8 plays, 84 yards, 4:26.
- NO – Aaron Brooks 7-yard run (John Carney kick), 6:23. Bears 20–14. Drive: 2 plays, 8 yards, 0:58.

Third quarter

- NO – Joe Horn 5-yard pass from Aaron Brooks (John Carney kick), 8:15. Saints 21–20. Drive: 12 plays, 65 yards, 6:45.

Fourth quarter

- CHI – Paul Edinger 25-yard field goal, 8:43. Bears 23–21. Drive: 11 plays, 70 yards, 5:59.
- NO – Donte Stallworth 29-yard pass from Aaron Brooks (Aaron Brooks run), 1:11. Saints 29–23. Drive: 7 plays, 73 yards, 2:01.

Top passers

- NO – Aaron Brooks – 22/34, 233 yards, 3 TD, INT
- CHI – Jim Miller – 26/40, 236 yards, 2 TD, INT

Top rushers

- NO – Deuce McAllister – 17 rushes, 45 yards
- CHI – Anthony Thomas – 27 rushes, 111 yards

Top receivers

- NO – Jerome Pathon – 5 receptions, 71 yards, TD
- CHI – Marty Booker – 8 receptions, 97 yards, TD

==== Week 4: at Buffalo Bills ====
Week 4: Chicago Bears (2–1) at Buffalo Bills (1–2) – Game summary

Quarter	1	2	3	4	OT	Total
Bears	7	7	3	10	0	27
Bills	7	10	3	7	6	33

at Ralph Wilson Stadium, Orchard Park, New York

- Date: September 29, 2002
- Game time: 1:00 pm
- Game weather: Sunny, 66 °F (19 °C)
- Game attendance: 72,780
- Referee: Tom White (123)
- TV announcers (FOX): Kenny Albert, Tim Green and Bob Trimble
- Recap, Game Book

Game information

First quarter

- BUF – Peerless Price 2-yard pass from Drew Bledsoe (Mike Hollis kick), 10:55. Bills 7–0. Drive: 7 plays, 75 yards, 4:12.
- CHI – Mike Brown 62-yard fumble return (Paul Edinger kick), 3:00. Tied 7–7.

Second quarter

- BUF – Mike Hollis 48-yard field goal, 13:05. Bills 10–7. Drive: 10 plays, 41 yards, 4:24.
- BUF – Eric Moulds 4-yard pass from Drew Bledsoe (Mike Hollis kick), 5:55. Bills 17–7. Drive: 8 plays, 76 yards, 4:59.
- CHI – David Terrell 5-yard pass from Jim Miller (Paul Edinger kick), 0:34. Bills 17–14. Drive: 9 plays, 77 yards, 4:08.

Third quarter

- BUF – Mike Hollis 49-yard field goal, 11:30. Bills 20–14. Drive: 5 plays, 13 yards, 2:13.
- CHI – Paul Edinger 46-yard field goal, 6:55. Bills 20–17. Drive: 4 plays, 6 yards, 0:45.

Fourth quarter

- CHI – Paul Edinger 24-yard field goal, 12:51. Tied 20–20. Drive: 8 plays, 64 yards, 2:42.
- BUF – Dave Moore 1-yard pass from Drew Bledsoe (Mike Hollis kick), 9:30. Bills 27–20. Drive: 6 plays, 78 yards, 3:44.
- CHI – John Davis 4-yard pass from Jim Miller (Paul Edinger kick), 3:39. Tied 27–27. Drive: 11 plays, 74 yards, 6:09.

Overtime

- BUF – Travis Henry 26-yard pass from Drew Bledsoe, 13:15. Bills 33–27. Drive: 2 plays, 56 yards, 0:53.

Top passers

- CHI – Jim Miller – 19/31, 188 yards, 2 TD
- BUF – Drew Bledsoe – 28/36, 328 yards, 4 TD

Top rushers

- CHI – Anthony Thomas – 23 rushes, 48 yards
- BUF – Travis Henry – 12 rushes, 68 yards

Top receivers

- CHI – Marty Booker – 4 receptions, 82 yards
- BUF – Eric Moulds – 8 receptions, 124 yards, TD

==== Week 5: vs. Green Bay Packers ====
Week 5: Green Bay Packers (3–1) at Chicago Bears (2–2) – Game summary

Quarter	1	2	3	4	Total
Packers	14	10	7	3	34
Bears	7	7	0	7	21

at Memorial Stadium, Champaign, Illinois

- Date: October 7, 2002
- Game time: 9:00 p.m.
- Game weather: Clear, 46 °F (8 °C)
- Game attendance: 63,226
- Referee: Ed Hochuli (85)
- TV announcers (ABC): Al Michaels, John Madden and Melissa Stark
- Recap, Game Book

Game information

First quarter

- GB – Donald Driver 85-yard pass from Brett Favre (Ryan Longwell kick), 10:56. Packers 7–0. Drive: 1 play, 85 yards, 0:12.
- GB – Tyrone Davis 19-yard pass from Brett Favre (Ryan Longwell kick), 3:32. Packers 14–0. Drive: 10 plays, 76 yards, 5:14.
- CHI – Marty Booker 4-yard pass from Jim Miller (Paul Edinger kick), 1:53. Packers 14–7. Drive: 3 plays, 37 yards, 1:39.

Second quarter

- GB – Bubba Franks 5-yard pass from Brett Favre (Ryan Longwell kick), 13:02. Packers 21–7. Drive: 8 plays, 74 yards, 3:51.
- CHI – John Davis 1-yard pass from Jim Miller (Paul Edinger kick), 2:50. Packers 21–14. Drive: 3 plays, 4 yards, 0:56.
- GB – Ryan Longwell 49-yard field goal, 0:00. Packers 24–14. Drive: 6 plays, 32 yards, 0:38.

Third quarter

- GB – Kabeer Gbaja-Biamila 72-yard interception return (Ryan Longwell kick), 8:53. Packers 31–14.

Fourth quarter

- GB – Ryan Longwell 35-yard field goal, 13:21. Packers 34–14. Drive: 7 plays, 48 yards, 2:44.
- CHI – John Davis 21-yard pass from Jim Miller (Paul Edinger kick), 6:50. Packers 34–21. Drive: 9 plays, 62 yards, 2:12.

Top passers

- GB – Brett Favre – 22/33, 359 yards, 3 TD
- CHI – Jim Miller – 27/49, 353 yards, 3 TD, 3 INT

Top rushers

- GB – Ahman Green – 27 rushes, 107 yards
- CHI – Anthony Thomas – 15 rushes, 45 yards

Top receivers

- GB – Terry Glenn – 8 receptions, 154 yards
- CHI – Marty Booker – 12 receptions, 141 yards, TD

==== Week 7: at Detroit Lions ====
Week 7: Chicago Bears (2–3) at Detroit Lions (1–4) – Game summary

Quarter	1	2	3	4	OT	Total
Bears	0	10	10	0	0	20
Lions	0	14	3	3	3	23

at Ford Field, Detroit, Michigan

- Date: October 20, 2002
- Game time: 1:00 p.m.
- Game weather: none (indoor stadium)
- Game attendance: 60,421
- Referee: Bernie Kukar (86)
- TV announcers (FOX): Dan Miller, Tim Green, and Jennifer Hammond
- Recap, Game Book

Game information

First quarter

- No scoring plays.

Second quarter

- CHI – Paul Edinger 53-yard field goal, 9:13. Bears 3–0. Drive: 10 plays, 36 yards, 4:58.
- DET – James Stewart 6-yard run (Jason Hanson kick), 4:59. Lions 7–3. Drive: 1 play, 6 yards, 0:03.
- DET – James Stewart 1-yard run (Jason Hanson kick), 1:11. Lions 14–3. Drive: 7 plays, 16 yards, 2:53.
- CHI – Marty Booker 14-yard pass from Chris Chandler (Paul Edinger kick), 0:05. Lions 14–10. Drive: 6 plays, 79 yards, 1:06.

Third quarter

- CHI – Anthony Thomas 1-yard run (Paul Edinger kick), 10:11. Bears 17–14. Drive: 8 plays, 75 yards, 4:49.
- CHI – Paul Edinger 42-yard field goal, 8:29. Bears 20–14. Drive: 4 plays, 1 yard, 0:13.
- DET – Jason Hanson 30-yard field goal, 0:34. Bears 20–17. Drive: 14 plays, 66 yards, 7:55.

Fourth quarter

- DET – Jason Hanson 24-yard field goal, 0:02. Tied 20–20. Drive: 11 plays, 72 yards, 2:19.

Overtime

- DET – Jason Hanson 48-yard field goal, 10:12. Lions 23–20. Drive: 8 plays, 30 yards, 4:48.

Top passers

- CHI – Chris Chandler – 16/25, 163 yards, TD, INT
- DET – Joey Harrington – 16/29, 199 yards

Top rushers

- CHI – Anthony Thomas – 26 rushes, 92 yards, TD
- DET – James Stewart – 32 rushes, 172 yards, 2 TD

Top receivers

- CHI – Dez White – 3 receptions, 70 yards
- DET – Aveion Cason – 3 receptions, 57 yards

==== Week 8: at Minnesota Vikings ====
Week 8: Chicago Bears (2–4) at Minnesota Vikings (1–5) – Game summary

Quarter	1	2	3	4	Total
Bears	0	0	0	7	7
Vikings	0	13	12	0	25

at Hubert H. Humphrey Metrodome, Minneapolis, Minnesota

- Date: October 27, 2002
- Game time: 1:00 p.m.
- Game weather: none (indoor stadium)
- Game attendance: 64,122
- Referee: Bill Leavy (127)
- TV announcers (FOX): Sam Rosen, Bill Maas, and Jeff Grayson
- Recap, Game Book

Game information

First quarter

- No scoring plays.

Second quarter

- MIN – Gary Anderson 44-yard field goal, 8:51. Vikings 3–0. Drive: 12 plays, 57 yards, 6:09.
- MIN – Moe Williams 1-yard run (Gary Anderson kick), 1:42. Vikings 10–0. Drive: 11 plays, 57 yards, 5:47.
- MIN – Gary Anderson 24-yard field goal, 0:03. Vikings 13–0. Drive: 4 plays, 8 yards, 0:52.

Third quarter

- MIN – Randy Moss 39-yard pass from Daunte Culpepper (Gary Anderson kick), 10:19. Vikings 20–0. Drive: 5 plays, 66 yards, 2:38.
- MIN – Anthony Thomas tackled in endzone by Fred Robbins and Nick Rogers for a safety, 7:13. Vikings 22–0.
- MIN – Gary Anderson 24-yard field goal, 1:24. Vikings 25–0. Drive: 11 plays, 53 yards, 5:49.

Fourth quarter

- CHI – Marty Booker 27-yard pass from Chris Chandler (Paul Edinger kick), 14:54. Vikings 25–7. Drive: 5 plays, 64 yards, 1:30.

Top passers

- CHI – Chris Chandler – 15/25, 176 yards, TD, INT
- MIN – Daunte Culpepper – 22/29, 216 yards, TD

Top rushers

- CHI – Henry Burris – 2 rushes, 19 yards
- MIN – Michael Bennett – 29 rushes, 106 yards

Top receivers

- CHI – Marty Booker – 4 receptions, 80 yards, TD
- MIN – Randy Moss – 9 receptions, 119 yards, TD

==== Week 9: vs. Philadelphia Eagles ====
Week 9: Philadelphia Eagles (5–2) at Chicago Bears (2–5) – Game summary

Quarter	1	2	3	4	Total
Eagles	0	7	6	6	19
Bears	0	13	0	0	13

at Memorial Stadium, Champaign, Illinois

- Date: November 3, 2002
- Game time: 1:00 p.m.
- Game weather: Light rain 38 °F (3 °C)
- Game attendance: 54,049
- Referee: Terry McAulay (77)
- TV announcers (FOX): Dick Stockton, Daryl Johnston, and Ron Pitts
- Recap, Game Book

Game information

First quarter

- No scoring plays.

Second quarter

- CHI – Paul Edinger 30-yard field goal, 9:28. Bears 3–0. Drive: 11 plays, 66 yards, 5:19.
- PHI – Donovan McNabb 5-yard run (David Akers kick), 4:42. Eagles 7–3. Drive: 10 plays, 73 yards, 4:46.
- CHI – Anthony Thomas 6-yard run (Paul Edinger kick), 1:17. Bears 10–7. Drive: 7 plays, 69 yards, 3:25.
- CHI – Paul Edinger 53-yard field goal, 0:00. Bears 13–7. Drive: 5 plays, 42 yards, 0:38.

Third quarter

- PHI – David Akers 23-yard field goal, 10:22. Bears 13–10. Drive: 10 plays, 54 yards, 4:38.
- PHI – David Akers 36-yard field goal, 5:42. Tied 13–13. Drive: 7 plays, 19 yards, 3:22.

Fourth quarter

- PHI – David Akers 27-yard field goal, 13:29. Eagles 16–13. Drive: 4 plays, 9 yards, 1:13.
- PHI – David Akers 22-yard field goal, 3:42. Eagles 19–13. Drive: 5 plays, 64 yards, 2:40.

Top passers

- PHI – Donovan McNabb – 18/33, 209 yards, INT
- CHI – Jim Miller – 19/36, 205 yards

Top rushers

- PHI – Donovan McNabb – 9 rushes, 46 yards, TD
- CHI – Anthony Thomas – 16 rushes, 52 yards, TD

Top receivers

- PHI – Antonio Freeman – 4 receptions, 67 yards
- CHI – Anthony Thomas – 4 receptions, 52 yards

==== Week 10: vs. New England Patriots ====
Week 10: New England Patriots (4–4) at Chicago Bears (2–6) – Game summary

Quarter	1	2	3	4	Total
Patriots	0	6	10	17	33
Bears	0	6	21	3	30

at Memorial Stadium, Champaign, Illinois

- Date: November 10, 2002
- Game time: 4:15 p.m.
- Game weather: Overcast, 60 °F (16 °C)
- Game attendance: 63,105
- Referee: Bob McElwee (95)
- TV announcers (CBS): Kevin Harlan, Randy Cross, and Beasley Reece
- Recap, Game Book

Game information

Second quarter

- CHI – Paul Edinger 39-yard field goal, 14:51. Bears 3–0. Drive: 13 plays, 46 yards, 7:14.
- NE – Adam Vinatieri 57-yard field goal, 10:15. Tied 3–3. Drive: 10 plays, 31 yards, 4:36.
- CHI – Paul Edinger 40-yard field goal, 5:31. Bears 6–3. Drive: 9 plays, 46 yards, 4:44.
- NE – Adam Vinatieri 31-yard field goal, 0:04. Tied 6–6. Drive: 7 plays, 55 yards, 1:24.

Third quarter

- CHI – Stanley Pritchett 11-yard pass from Jim Miller (Paul Edinger kick), 12:21. Bears 13–6. Drive: 2 plays, 14 yards, 0:40.
- CHI – Marcus Robinson 44-yard pass from Marty Booker (Paul Edinger kick), 10:09. Bears 20–6. Drive: 1 play, 44 yards, 0:09.
- CHI – Anthony Thomas 2-yard run (Paul Edinger kick), 6:42. Bears 27–6. Drive: 3 plays, 36 yards, 0:37.
- NE – Kevin Faulk 15-yard pass from Tom Brady (Adam Vinatieri kick), 3:04. Bears 27–13. Drive: 8 plays, 75 yards, 3:38.
- NE – Adam Vinatieri 42–yard field goal, 1:50. Bears 27–16. Drive: 4 plays, 2 yards, 0:58.

Fourth quarter

- NE – Adam Vinatieri 25-yard field goal, 11:02. Bears 27–19. Drive: 16 plays, 54 yards, 4:44.
- CHI – Paul Edinger 32-yard field goal, 5:22. Bears 30–19. Drive: 9 plays, 38 yards, 5:40.
- NE – Kevin Faulk 36-yard pass from Tom Brady (run failed), 2:46. Bears 30–25. Drive: 7 plays, 63 yards, 2:16.
- NE – David Patten 20-yard pass from Tom Brady (Tom Brady–Troy Brown pass), 0:21. Patriots 33–30. Drive: 8 plays, 56 yards, 1:29.

Top passers

- NE – Tom Brady – 36/55, 328 yards, 3 TD, INT
- CHI – Jim Miller – 8/18, 72 yards, TD, INT

Top rushers

- NE – Antowain Smith – 10 rushes, 41 yards
- CHI – Anthony Thomas – 21 rushes, 99 yards, TD

Top receivers

- NE – Kevin Faulk – 7 receptions, 109 yards, 2 TD
- CHI – Marty Booker – 4 receptions, 65 yards

==== Week 11: at St. Louis Rams ====
Week 11: Chicago Bears (2–7) at St. Louis Rams (4–5) – Game summary

Quarter	1	2	3	4	Total
Bears	0	6	7	3	16
Rams	7	7	0	7	21

at Edward Jones Dome, St. Louis, Missouri

- Date: November 18, 2002
- Game time: 9:00 p.m.
- Game weather: None (indoor stadium)
- Game attendance: 66,250
- Referee: Gerry Austin (34)
- TV announcers (ABC): Al Michaels, John Madden and Melissa Stark
- Recap, Game Book

Game information

First quarter

- STL – Ernie Conwell 1-yard run (Jeff Wilkins kick), 10:05. Rams 7–0. Drive: 10 plays, 65 yards, 4:55.

Second quarter

- CHI – Paul Edinger 37-yard field goal, 14:10. Rams 7–3. Drive: 13 plays, 66 yards, 6:59.
- CHI – Paul Edinger 48-yard field goal, 6:15. Rams 7–6. Drive: 4 plays, 3 yards, 2:08.
- STL – Lamar Gordon 22-yard pass from Marc Bulger (Jeff Wilkins kick), 0:42. Rams 14–6. Drive: 4 plays, 81 yards, 0:46.

Third quarter

- CHI – Anthony Thomas 13-yard run (Paul Edinger kick), 9:23. Rams 14–13. Drive: 11 plays, 64 yards, 5:37.

Fourth quarter

- STL – Ricky Proehl 8-yard pass from Marc Bulger (Jeff Wilkins kick), 9:01. Rams 21–13. Drive: 10 plays, 82 yards, 5:14.
- CHI – Paul Edinger 50-yard field goal, 3:48. Rams 21–16. Drive: 6 plays, 32 yards, 3:04.

Top passers

- CHI – Chris Chandler – 20/33, 157 yards
- STL – Marc Bulger – 21/35, 347 yards, 2 TD, INT

Top rushers

- CHI – Anthony Thomas – 14 rushes, 61 yards, TD
- STL – Lamar Gordon – 16 rushes, 45 yards

Top receivers

- CHI – Marty Booker – 7 receptions, 65 yards
- STL – Isaac Bruce – 6 receptions, 141 yards

==== Week 12: vs. Detroit Lions ====
Week 12: Detroit Lions (3–7) at Chicago Bears (2–8) – Game summary

Quarter	1	2	3	4	OT	Total
Lions	0	3	14	0	0	17
Bears	0	7	0	10	3	20

at Memorial Stadium, Champaign, Illinois

- Date: November 24, 2002
- Game time: 1:00 p.m.
- Game weather: Partly cloudy 45 °F (7 °C)
- Game attendance: 62,375
- Referee: Tony Corrente (99)
- TV announcers (FOX): Pat Summerall, Brian Baldinger and Dan Jiggetts
- Recap, Game Book

Game information

First quarter

- No scoring plays.

Second quarter

- CHI – Marcus Robinson 3-yard pass from Chris Chandler (Paul Edinger kick), 13:42. Bears 7–0. Drive: 5 plays, 14 yards, 2:18.
- DET – Jason Hanson 22-yard field goal, 5:46. Bears 7–3. Drive: 13 plays, 74 yards, 5:42.

Third quarter

- DET – Germane Crowell 1-yard pass from Joey Harrington (Jason Hanson kick), 5:09. Lions 10–7. Drive: 15 plays, 69 yards, 8:05.
- DET – James Stewart 23-yard run (Jason Hanson kick), 2:38. Lions 17–7. Drive: 4 plays, 35 yards, 1:35.

Fourth quarter

- CHI – Dez White 23-yard pass from Jim Miller (Paul Edinger kick), 2:33. Lions 17–14. Drive: 12 plays, 91 yards, 3:46.
- CHI – Paul Edinger 22-yard field goal, 0:00. Tied 17–17. Drive: 10 plays, 43 yards, 1:56.

Overtime

- CHI – Paul Edinger 40-yard field goal, 8:58. Bears 20–17. Drive: 13 plays, 43 yards, 6:02.

Top passers

- DET – Joey Harrington – 21/40, 213 yards, TD, INT
- CHI – Jim Miller – 21/35, 250 yards, TD

Top rushers

- DET – James Stewart – 22 rushes, 85 yards, TD
- CHI – Anthony Thomas – 14 rushes, 40 yards

Top receivers

- DET – Scotty Anderson – 5 receptions, 70 yards
- CHI – Marty Booker – 10 receptions, 157 yards

==== Week 13: at Green Bay Packers ====
Week 13: Chicago Bears (3–8) at Green Bay Packers (8–3) – Game summary

Quarter	1	2	3	4	Total
Bears	7	7	0	6	20
Packers	3	3	10	14	30

at Lambeau Field, Green Bay, Wisconsin

- Date: December 1, 2002
- Game time: 1:00 pm
- Game weather: Cloudy, 23 °F (−5 °C)
- Game attendance: 64,196
- Referee: Ron Winter (14)
- TV announcers (FOX): Dick Stockton, Daryl Johnston, and Ron Pitts
- Recap, Game Book

Game information

First quarter

- CHI – Dustin Lyman 12-yard pass from Brad Maynard (Paul Edinger kick), 2:31. Bears 7–0. Drive: 4 plays, 18 yards, 1:14.
- GB – Ryan Longwell 21-yard field goal, 2:31. Bears 7–3. Drive: 7 plays, 46 yards, 3:15.

Second quarter

- CHI – Dustin Lyman 8-yard pass from Jim Miller (Paul Edinger kick), 5:20. Bears 14–3. Drive: 12 plays, 72 yards, 6:04.
- GB – Ryan Longwell 31-yard field goal, 1:03. Bears 14–6. Drive: 11 plays, 52 yards, 4:17.

Third quarter

- GB – Bubba Franks 6-yard pass from Brett Favre (Ryan Longwell kick), 11:43. Bears 14–13. Drive: 7 plays, 62 yards, 3:17.
- GB – Ryan Longwell 27-yard field goal, 1:05. Packers 16–14. Drive: 14 plays, 90 yards, 6:21.

Fourth quarter

- GB – William Henderson 1-yard pass from Brett Favre (Ryan Longwell kick), 8:09. Packers 23–14. Drive: 7 plays, 35 yards, 3:39.
- GB – Tony Fisher 2-yard run (Ryan Longwell kick), 1:10. Packers 30–14. Drive: 7 plays, 58 yards, 2:11.
- CHI – Marcus Robinson 45-yard pass from Henry Burris (pass failed), 0:10. Packers 30–20. Drive: 4 plays, 68 yards, 1:00.

Top passers

- CHI – Jim Miller – 25/36, 191 yards, TD, INT
- GB – Brett Favre – 24/42, 221 yards, 2 TD, INT

Top rushers

- CHI – Leon Johnson – 11 rushes, 46 yards
- GB – Tony Fisher – 17 rushes, 91 yards, TD

Top receivers

- CHI – Dustin Lyman – 7 receptions, 58 yards, 2 TD
- GB – Donald Driver – 5 receptions, 65 yards

==== Week 14: at Miami Dolphins ====
Week 14: Chicago Bears (3–9) at Miami Dolphins (7–5) – Game summary

Quarter	1	2	3	4	Total
Bears	3	0	3	6	12
Dolphins	7	7	7	6	27

at Pro Player Stadium, Miami Gardens, Florida

- Date: December 9, 2002
- Game time: 9:00 p.m.
- Game weather: Cloudy, 72 °F (22 °C)
- Game attendance: 73,609
- Referee: Ron Blum (7)
- TV announcers (ABC): Al Michaels, John Madden and Melissa Stark
- Recap, Game Book

Game information

First quarter

- MIA – Jed Weaver 5-yard pass from Jay Fiedler (Olindo Mare kick), 7:30. Dolphins 7–0. Drive: 4 plays, 38 yards, 2:01.

Second quarter

- MIA – Ricky Williams 15-yard run (Olindo Mare kick), 4:12. Dolphins 14–0. Drive: 7 plays, 84 yards, 3:14.

Third quarter

- CHI – Paul Edinger 52-yard field goal, 10:15. Dolphins 14–3. Drive: 4 plays, 2 yards, 0:54.
- MIA – Ricky Williams 63-yard run (Olindo Mare kick), 9:16. Dolphins 21–3. Drive: 2 plays, 65 yards, 0:59.

Fourth quarter

- MIA – Olindo Mare 23-yard field goal, 7:26. Dolphins 24–3. Drive: 4 plays, 5 yards, 1:39.
- MIA – Olindo Mare 29-yard field goal, 5:41. Dolphins 27–3. Drive: 4 plays, 7 yards, 1:31.
- CHI – Marty Booker 6-yard pass from Henry Burris (pass failed), 0:44. Dolphins 27–9. Drive: 6 plays, 58 yards, 1:26.

Top passers

- CHI – Chris Chandler – 7/17, 86 yards, 2 INT
- MIA – Jay Fiedler – 15/29, 196 yards, TD, INT

Top rushers

- CHI – Henry Burris – 5 rushes, 52 yards
- MIA – Ricky Williams – 31 rushes, 216 yards, 2 TD

Top receivers

- CHI – Marty Booker – 5 receptions, 46 yards, TD
- MIA – James McKnight – 4 receptions, 90 yards

==== Week 15: vs. New York Jets ====
Week 15: New York Jets (7–6) at Chicago Bears (3–10) – Game summary

Quarter	1	2	3	4	Total
Jets	0	0	10	3	13
Bears	0	10	7	3	20

at Memorial Stadium, Champaign, Illinois

- Date: December 15, 2002
- Game time: 1:00 pm
- Game weather: Partly Cloudy, 43 °F (6 °C)
- Game attendance: 62,226
- Referee: Mike Carey (94)
- TV announcers (CBS): Kevin Harlan, Randy Cross, and Beasley Reece
- Recap. Game Book

Game information

Second quarter

- CHI – Paul Edinger 53-yard field goal, 8:30. Bears 3–0. Drive: 5 plays, 26 yards, 3:23.
- CHI – Adrian Peterson 5-yard run (Paul Edinger kick), 1:41. Bears 10–0. Drive: 11 plays, 67 yards, 5:23.

Third quarter

- NYJ – Wayne Chrebet 5-yard pass from Chad Pennington (John Hall kick), 11:11. Bears 10–7. Drive: 7 plays, 69 yards, 4:05.
- CHI – Leon Johnson 2-yard run (Paul Edinger kick), 7:42. Bears 17–7. Drive: 6 plays, 63 yards, 3:36.
- NYJ – John Hall 42-yard field goal, 0:36. Bears 17–10. Drive: 11 plays, 50 yards, 7:06.

Fourth quarter

- NYJ – John Hall 28-yard field goal, 7:26. Bears 17–13. Drive: 11 plays, 83 yards, 4:42.
- CHI – Paul Edinger 48-yard field goal, 2:44. Bears 20–13. Drive: 11 plays, 31 yards, 4:44.

Top passers

- NYJ – Chad Pennington – 22/33, 207 yards, TD
- CHI – Chris Chandler – 22/27, 177 yards

Top rushers

- NYJ – Curtis Martin – 21 rushes, 127 yards
- CHI – Leon Johnson – 14 rushes, 56 yards, TD

Top receivers

- NYJ – Laveranues Coles – 5 receptions, 71 yards
- CHI – Marty Booker – 9 receptions, 62 yards

==== Week 16: at Carolina Panthers ====
Week 16: Chicago Bears (4–10) at Carolina Panthers (5–9) – Game summary

Quarter	1	2	3	4	Total
Bears	7	0	0	7	14
Panthers	0	21	0	3	24

at Ericsson Stadium, Charlotte, North Carolina

- Date: December 22, 2002
- Game time: 1:00 pm
- Game weather: Sunny, 56 °F (13 °C)
- Game attendance: 72,602
- Referee: Terry McAulay (77)
- TV announcers (FOX): Pat Summerall, Brian Baldinger, and Dan Jiggetts
- Recap, Game Book

Game information

First quarter

- CHI – Dez White 76-yard pass from Chris Chandler (Paul Edinger kick), 14:13. Bears 7–0. Drive: 2 plays, 80 yards, 0:47.

Second quarter

- CAR – Dee Brown 2-yard run (Shayne Graham kick), 12:12. Tied 7–7. Drive: 6 plays, 85 yards, 2:33.
- CAR – Dee Brown 1-yard run (Shayne Graham kick), 8:38. Panthers 14–7. Drive: 3 plays, 11 yards, 0:51.
- CAR – Muhsin Muhammad 3-yard pass from Rodney Peete (Shayne Graham kick), 3:52. Panthers 21–7. Drive: 4 plays, 41 yards, 1:54.

Third quarter

- No scoring plays.

Fourth quarter

- CHI – Dez White 5-yard pass from Henry Burris (Paul Edinger kick), 11:48. Panthers 21–14. Drive: 3 plays, 8 yards, 1:32.
- CAR – Shayne Graham 25-yard field goal, 5:16. Panthers 24–14. Drive: 4 plays, -1 yard, 2:08.

Top passers

- CHI – Chris Chandler – 7/8, 113 yards, TD
- CAR – Rodney Peete – 18/35, 179 yards, TD

Top rushers

- CHI – Leon Johnson – 16 rushes, 29 yards
- CAR – Dee Brown – 23 rushes, 55 yards, 2 TD

Top receivers

- CHI – Dez White – 2 receptions, 81 yards, 2 TD
- CAR – Steve Smith Sr. – 4 receptions, 97 yards

==== Week 17: Tampa Bay Buccaneers ====
Week 17: Tampa Bay Buccaneers (11–4) at Chicago Bears (4–11) – Game summary

Quarter	1	2	3	4	Total
Buccaneers	0	6	0	9	15
Bears	0	0	0	0	0

at Memorial Stadium, Champaign, Illinois

- Date: December 29, 2002
- Game time: 8:30 pm
- Game weather: Partly Cloudy, 43 °F (6 °C)
- Game attendance: 55,832
- Referee: Bernie Kukar (86)
- TV announcers (ESPN): Mike Patrick, Joe Theismann and Suzy Kolber
- Recap, Game Book

Game information

First quarter

- No scoring plays.

Second quarter

- TB – Martin Gramatica 30-yard field goal, 3:22. Buccaneers 3–0. Drive: 12 plays, 48 yards, 6:48.
- TB – Martin Gramatica 32-yard field goal, 0:02. Buccaneers 6–0. Drive: 5 plays, 20 yards, 0:58.

Third quarter

- No scoring plays.

Fourth quarter

- TB – Martin Gramatica 33-yard field goal, 13:12. Buccaneers 9–0. Drive: 15 plays, 65 yards, 8:10.
- TB – Martin Gramatica 26-yard field goal, 7:01. Buccaneers 12–0. Drive: 10 plays, 40 yards, 6:04.
- TB – Martin Gramatica 33-yard field goal, 3:09. Buccaneers 15–0. Drive: 4 plays, 3 yards, 0:25.

Top passers

- TB – Rob Johnson – 16/25, 134 yards
- CHI – Henry Burris – 7/19, 78 yards, 4 INT

Top rushers

- TB – Michael Pittman Sr. – 21 rushes, 90 yards
- CHI – Adrian Peterson – 7 rushes, 42 yards

Top receivers

- TB – Keyshawn Johnson – 5 receptions, 41 yards
- CHI – Marty Booker – 4 receptions, 25 yards

== Standings ==
=== Division ===
NFC North
	W	L	T	PCT	DIV	CONF	PF	PA	STK
^{(3)} Green Bay Packers	12	4	0	.750	5–1	9–3	398	328	L1
Minnesota Vikings	6	10	0	.375	4–2	5–7	390	442	W3
Chicago Bears	4	12	0	.250	2–4	3–9	281	379	L2
Detroit Lions	3	13	0	.188	1–5	3–9	306	451	L8

=== Conference ===
NFC
#	Team	Division	W	L	T	PCT	DIV	CONF	SOS	SOV
Division leaders
1 (Note: Philadelphia finished ahead of Tampa Bay and Green Bay based on conference record (11–1 vs 9–3/9–3).)	Philadelphia Eagles	East	12	4	0	.750	5–1	11–1	.469	.432
2 (Note: Tampa Bay finished ahead of Green Bay based on head-to-head victory.)	Tampa Bay Buccaneers	South	12	4	0	.750	4–2	9–3	.482	.432
3	Green Bay Packers	North	12	4	0	.750	5–1	9–3	.451	.414
4	San Francisco 49ers	West	10	6	0	.625	5–1	8–4	.504	.450
Wild Cards
5	New York Giants	East	10	6	0	.625	5–1	8–4	.482	.450
6	Atlanta Falcons	South	9	6	1	.594	4–2	7–5	.494	.429
Did not qualify for the postseason
7	New Orleans Saints	South	9	7	0	.563	3–3	7–5	.498	.566
8 (Note: St. Louis finished ahead of Seattle based on division record (4–2 to 2–4).)	St. Louis Rams	West	7	9	0	.438	4–2	5–7	.508	.446
9	Seattle Seahawks	West	7	9	0	.438	2–4	5–7	.506	.433
10 (Note: Washington finished ahead of Carolina based on common games (2–3 to 1–4))	Washington Redskins	East	7	9	0	.438	1–5	4–8	.527	.438
11	Carolina Panthers	South	7	9	0	.438	1–5	4–8	.486	.357
12	Minnesota Vikings	North	6	10	0	.375	4–2	5–7	.498	.417
13 (Note: Arizona finished ahead of Dallas based on head-to-head victory.)	Arizona Cardinals	West	5	11	0	.313	1–5	5–7	.500	.400
14	Dallas Cowboys	East	5	11	0	.313	1–5	3–9	.500	.475
15	Chicago Bears	North	4	12	0	.250	2–4	3–9	.521	.430
16	Detroit Lions	North	3	13	0	.188	1–5	3–9	.494	.375
Tiebreakers (Note: When breaking ties for three or more teams under the NFL's rules, they are first broken within divisions, then comparing only the highest-ranked remaining team from each division.)
