= Keith Traylor =

American football player (born 1969)

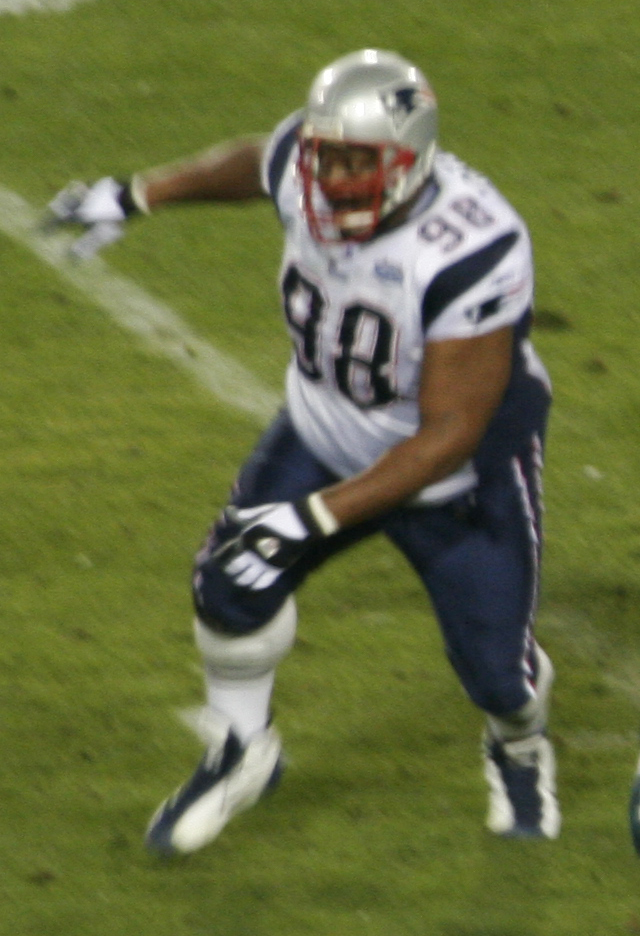
- Traylor in Super Bowl XXXIX

No. 54, 97, 75, 94, 98
- Positions: Nose tackle, linebacker

Personal information
- Born: September 3, 1969 (age 57); Little Rock, Arkansas, U.S.
- Listed height: 6 ft 2 in (1.88 m)
- Listed weight: 337 lb (153 kg)

Career information
- High school: Malvern (AR)
- College: Central Oklahoma
- NFL draft: 1991: 3rd round, 61st overall pick

Career history
- Denver Broncos (1991–1992); Los Angeles Raiders (1993)*; Green Bay Packers (1993); Kansas City Chiefs (1993); Barcelona Dragons (1995); Kansas City Chiefs (1995–1996); Denver Broncos (1997–2000); Chicago Bears (2001–2003); New England Patriots (2004); Miami Dolphins (2005–2007)
- * Offseason or practice squad member only

Awards and highlights
- 3× Super Bowl champion (XXXII, XXXIII, XXXIX); PFWA All-Rookie Team (1991); First-team All-LSC (1990)

Career NFL statistics
- Tackles: 473
- Sacks: 20
- Forced fumbles: 10
- Fumble recoveries: 3
- Interceptions: 2
- Touchdowns: 1
- Stats at Pro Football Reference

Byron Keith Traylor (born September 3, 1969) is an American former professional football player who was a nose tackle for 17 seasons in the National Football League (NFL). He was originally drafted by the Denver Broncos in the third round of the 1991 NFL draft. He played college football at Central Oklahoma. Traylor has won a total of three Super Bowl rings; he won two with the Denver Broncos and one with the New England Patriots.

== Early life ==
Keith Traylor was born September 3, 1969, into an athletic family. His mother, Vernestine, was a standout high school basketball player before giving birth to him at age seventeen, and his two younger brothers played college football and basketball, respectively. Traylor was a two-time all-state and all-conference linebacker at Malvern High School in Malvern, Arkansas. He also excelled in basketball and baseball, earning all-state and all-conference honors in both sports. Traylor was named Player of the Decade for the 1980s by the Arkansas Democrat-Gazette, and is second in state history for tackles in a season, amassing 231 tackles in 1985. Traylor, who was considered one of the top ten players in the country as a senior, was one of several highly rated high school football players in Arkansas during the mid-1980s, including Little Rock Parkview's Keith Jackson and Pine Bluff High School's Eric Mitchell.

== College career ==
After finishing high school as a two-time All-American, Traylor originally signed with the Oklahoma Sooners. A 6–3, 250 pound linebacker who ran the 40-yard dash in 4.57 seconds, assistant coach Merv Johnson called Traylor a "tremendous physical specimen," and an "exciting, high-profile recruit." Academic problems forced Traylor to leave Oklahoma after only four months, going first to Southeastern Oklahoma State University, in Durant, Oklahoma under head coach Morris Sloan, before eventually settling at the University of Central Oklahoma.

Traylor began his collegiate career at Coffeyville Community College in Coffeyville, Kansas where he played two seasons (1987–88) under head coach Dick Foster. He was named Honorable Mention All-American as a freshman, and was a 1st Team All-American as a sophomore. In two seasons at Coffeyville he totalled 229 tackles, 14 sacks, and 9 interceptions. Traylor transferred and played two seasons at the University of Central Oklahoma. He amassed 146 tackles, five sacks, two interceptions, three forced fumbles and a pair of fumble recoveries at Central Oklahoma. He was a first-team All-Lone Star Conference selection as a senior when he posted 79 tackles, five sacks, two interceptions and two fumble recoveries. On October 18, 2006, Traylor was named one of the top 75 players and coaches in the history of the Lone Star Conference to commemorate the conference's 75th anniversary.

== Professional career ==
=== Denver Broncos ===
Traylor was projected to be one of the top thirty prospects leading up to the 1991 NFL draft, but was not selected until the Denver Broncos picked him in the third-round (61st pick overall). He played in all 16 regular season games for the Broncos as a rookie, making two starts and recording 27 tackles. His first start of NFL career came against the Seattle Seahawks on September 15, 1991, when he opened at an inside linebacker spot in place of the injured Michael Brooks. Traylor responded with nine tackles in the game. He also started the following week against the San Diego Chargers and recorded ten tackles. He saw action in both playoff games following the season in a reserve role. During the playoffs, he saw some time at fullback in goal line situations. Following the season, he was named to the All-Rookie Team by Pro Football Weekly and Football Digest.

Traylor started three of the 16 games in which he played with the Broncos in 1992. He collected 39 tackles, a sack and a forced fumble. The first sack of his professional career occurred against the Seahawks on December 20, when he tackled quarterback Stan Gelbaugh for a 14-yard loss. Traylor was waived by the Broncos in June 1993.

=== Los Angeles Raiders ===
Traylor signed with the Los Angeles Raiders on July 19, 1993, but was released just over a month later.

=== Green Bay Packers ===
He signed with the Green Bay Packers on September 14 and played in five games with the team, all in a reserve role. He was also inactive for one game with the Packers. Traylor was released on November 9.

=== Kansas City Chiefs ===
Traylor remained a free agent until being signed by the Kansas City Chiefs on January 5, 1994. He was inactive for the team's first-round playoff game and was waived the following week. He was re-signed by the Chiefs in May 1994, but was released by the team on August 28 during final cutdowns and spent the entire season out of football.

Traylor was once again re-signed by the Chiefs on February 28, 1995. Playing in the World League of American Football (now NFL Europa) Traylor began to add mass to his linebacker's body for a move to the defensive line. He started three of the eight games that he played with the Barcelona Dragons, recording 18 tackles and a pair of fumble recoveries.

Traylor made the Chiefs' roster out of training camp and appeared in all 16 games in a reserve role. He was credited with 19 tackles, 1.5 sacks, a fumble recovery, a forced fumble and four passes defensed. His best game of the year came against the San Diego Chargers, when he recorded three tackles and a sack.

Traylor played in 15 games with the Chiefs in 1996, including one start. He notched 42 tackles, a sack, a forced fumble and a pass defensed. He also blocked a Cole Ford 43-yard field goal attempt against the Oakland Raiders. He had a season-high six tackles against the Pittsburgh Steelers on Monday Night Football, while his lone sack of the season occurred against the Detroit Lions.

=== Return to Denver ===
In 1997, Traylor returned to the team that drafted him six years prior, playing now as a defensive tackle. He started all 16 regular season games after re-joining the Broncos, posting 51 tackles, two sacks, an interception and two passes defensed for a unit that ranked fifth in the NFL in overall defense (291.9 ypg). His sack total marked a career-high, a figure he would equal three times in his career. His tackle total led all Broncos linemen. His first career interception came against the Buffalo Bills when he picked off a Todd Collins pass and returned it 62 yards for a touchdown, as the Broncos went on for a 23–20 overtime victory after not arriving in Buffalo until well after midnight the night before because of a snowstorm.

Traylor also started all four playoff games following the season, registering 11 tackles, a sack and two passes defensed. He was awarded a game ball in the Broncos’ Divisional playoff victory at Kansas City when he recorded three tackles, including two tackles for loss, just two days after his mother died. He registered two tackles, including a sack and a pass breakup in AFC Championship game at Pittsburgh. He posted two tackles against the Green Bay Packers on January 25, 1998, as his team won Super Bowl XXXII.

Starting 14 of the 15 games in which he played with the Broncos in 1998, Traylor registered 49 tackles, two sacks, a fumble recovery and two passes defensed. He was part of a unit that ranked third in the NFL in rush defense (80.4 ypg). He was inactive for one game in September with a sprained ankle. Traylor started each of Denver's three playoff games, including the team's Super Bowl XXXIII victory over the Atlanta Falcons in Miami, Florida. He totaled six tackles and a pass defensed in the playoffs.

In 1999, Traylor started all 15 games that he played with Denver. He collected 42 tackles, 1.5 sacks, two forced fumbles and a career-high six passes defensed. His lone full sack of the season came against the Detroit Lions, while he forced fumbles against the Jacksonville Jaguars and San Diego Chargers.

In what would be his final season as a Bronco, Traylor started all 16 regular season games and recorded a career-high 53 total tackles. He also added one sack, a fumble recovery, two forced fumbles and four passes defensed. His tackle total led all Denver linemen. Over a five-game span during the year, he registered 23 tackles, including six against the New England Patriots, one of which was a sack. He had a fumble recovery and forced fumble against the San Diego Chargers on November 19.

=== Chicago Bears ===
Traylor joined the Chicago Bears as an unrestricted free agent in 2001 and went on to start 15 of the 16 games in which he appeared. He had 45 tackles, two sacks, an interception, two forced fumbles and four passes defensed. He was part of a defensive unit that ranked second in the NFL, allowing an average of only 82.1 yards rushing per game. Traylor and Ted Washington controlled the middle of the field, allowing young linebacker Brian Urlacher to roam the field and make plays. Traylor's second career interception came in the season finale against the Jacksonville Jaguars, when he picked off a Mark Brunell pass and returned it 67 yards to the Jaguars' 9 yard line, setting up a Bears touchdown two plays afterward in a 33–13 victory. He started the team's Divisional Playoff game against the Philadelphia Eagles and was credited with four tackles and a pass defended.

In 2002, Traylor started all 15 games that he played with the Bears. He registered 41 tackles, a sack, a forced fumble and two passes defensed. He posted a season-high five tackles and registered his only sack against the St. Louis Rams in a Monday night game. The Bears finished with a 4–12 record.

Traylor entered the 2003 season in a battle with Bryan Robinson for a starting position on the Bears’ defensive line. Both Robinson and Traylor earned starting positions. Robinson started all sixteen games, and Traylor started all ten games in which he played with Chicago in 2003, recording 18 tackles, a forced fumble and three passes defensed. He was inactive for six contests (Weeks 4–8, 15).

=== New England Patriots ===
Traylor joined the New England Patriots in 2004 and went on to start 10 of the 16 regular season games at nose tackle. He posted 33 tackles on the year and was part of a unit that ranked sixth in the NFL in rush defense, allowing an average of only 98.3 yards per game. He started each of the final ten regular season games and opened two of three postseason contests. He recorded two tackles in the playoffs, including one in Super Bowl XXXIX as the Patriots beat the Eagles and Traylor earned his third Super Bowl ring. He ended up wearing number 98 because his Patriots teammate Ty Warren was wearing his traditional number 94.

=== Miami Dolphins ===
Traylor joined the Miami Dolphins in 2005, as the team needed a nose tackle after then-head coach Nick Saban began to implement a hybrid defense that used the 3–4 on occasion. He started all 13 games in which he played and was inactive for three contests with a knee injury. He tallied 40 tackles, a pair of sacks and two passes defensed on the year. His sack total tied a personal single-season high that he achieved on three previous occasions (1997, 1998, 2001). He was part of a defensive line that allowed a 3.7-yard average per rush attempt, a figure that ranked fourth in the AFC and seventh in the NFL. He underwent surgery on December 6 to remove debris in his right knee, and was inactive for two games before returning to starting lineup for final two games. The season finale marked his 200th career regular season game.

For the 2006 season, Traylor had 36 tackles and has four sacks for 18 yards in losses. He was placed on Injured Reserve on December 30 with a knee injury, missing the last game of the season. Before going on IR he started 14 games during the year and was inactive once due to knee problems.

Traylor's four sacks on the season represented a single season career high, surpassing his previous single season high of two sacks, which he accomplished four times (1997, 1998, 2001, and 2005). With six sacks in his last 21 regular season games (all with Miami), Traylor has accounted for almost half the number of sacks in those 21 games as he recorded in the first 193 games of his career.

An unrestricted free agent in the 2007 offseason, Traylor was re-signed by the Dolphins to a two-year deal on March 8. It was previously believed that Fred Evans was the favorite to replace Traylor at nose tackle in 2007 before the veteran re-signed. After a confrontation with teammate Vernon Carey before the final game of the 2007 season, Traylor was kicked off the Dolphins by then-coach Cam Cameron.

On February 11, 2008, Traylor was one of nine players released by the Dolphins.

== NFL career statistics ==
Legend
	Won the Super Bowl
**Bold**	Career high

=== Regular season ===
Year	Team	Games		Tackles				Interceptions				Fumbles			
Year	Team	GP	GS	Comb	Solo	Ast	Sck	Int	Yds	TD	Lng	FF	FR	Yds	TD
1991	DEN	**16**	2	27	27	0	0.0	0	0	0	0	0	0	0	0
1992	DEN	**16**	3	39	**39**	0	1.0	0	0	0	0	1	0	0	0
1993	GB	5	0	1	1	0	0.0	0	0	0	0	0	0	0	0
1995	KC	**16**	0	11	9	2	1.5	0	0	0	0	1	**1**	**9**	0
1996	KC	15	2	27	21	6	1.0	0	0	0	0	1	0	0	0
1997	DEN	**16**	**16**	39	28	**11**	2.0	**1**	62	**1**	62	0	0	0	0
1998	DEN	15	14	32	24	8	2.0	0	0	0	0	0	**1**	0	0
1999	DEN	15	15	32	26	6	1.5	0	0	0	0	1	0	0	0
2000	DEN	**16**	**16**	37	32	5	1.0	0	0	0	0	**2**	**1**	0	0
2001	CHI	**16**	15	35	31	4	2.0	**1**	**67**	0	**67**	1	0	0	0
2002	CHI	15	15	36	31	5	1.0	0	0	0	0	1	0	0	0
2003	CHI	10	10	17	13	4	0.0	0	0	0	0	1	0	0	0
2004	NE	**16**	10	28	23	5	0.0	0	0	0	0	0	0	0	0
2005	MIA	13	13	32	22	10	2.0	0	0	0	0	0	0	0	0
2006	MIA	14	14	36	28	8	**4.0**	0	0	0	0	1	0	0	0
2007	MIA	15	14	**44**	33	**11**	1.0	0	0	0	0	0	0	0	0
		229	159	473	388	85	20.0	2	129	1	67	10	3	9	0

=== Playoffs ===
Year	Team	Games		Tackles				Interceptions				Fumbles			
Year	Team	GP	GS	Comb	Solo	Ast	Sck	Int	Yds	TD	Lng	FF	FR	Yds	TD
1991	DEN	2	0	0	0	0	0.0	0	0	0	0	0	0	0	0
1995	KC	1	0	1	1	0	0.0	0	0	0	0	0	0	0	0
1997	DEN	**4**	**4**	**8**	**8**	0	**1.0**	0	0	0	0	0	0	0	0
1998	DEN	3	3	6	5	**1**	0.0	0	0	0	0	0	0	0	0
2000	DEN	1	1	1	0	**1**	0.0	0	0	0	0	0	0	0	0
2001	CHI	1	1	3	3	0	0.0	0	0	0	0	0	0	0	0
2004	NE	3	2	1	0	**1**	0.0	0	0	0	0	0	0	0	0
		15	11	20	17	3	1.0	0	0	0	0	0	0	0	0

== Personal life ==
Traylor has one son, Brandon. He currently resides in Broken Arrow, Oklahoma. Traylor had two brothers that played sports collegiately: Eric Traylor, who played basketball at New Mexico State from 1991 to 1993, and Mark Traylor, who played football at Louisiana-Lafayette in the early 1990s. Mark Traylor died after suffering several years from Behçet's disease, a rare immune disorder.
