= Joe Tafoya =

American football player (born 1978)

No. 99, 69, 71
- Position: Defensive end

Personal information
- Born: September 6, 1978 (age 48); Pittsburg, California, U.S.
- Listed height: 6 ft 4 in (1.93 m)
- Listed weight: 264 lb (120 kg)

Career information
- High school: Pittsburg (CA)
- College: Arizona
- NFL draft: 2001: 7th round, 234th overall pick

Career history
- Chicago Bears (2001–2003); Arizona Cardinals (2004)*; Atlanta Falcons (2004)*; Atlanta Falcons (2005)*; Seattle Seahawks (2005–2006); Arizona Cardinals (2007)
- * Offseason or practice squad member only

Awards and highlights
- 2× Second-team All-Pac-10 (1999, 2000)

Career NFL statistics
- Total tackles: 115
- Sacks: 3.5
- Forced fumbles: 1
- Fumble recoveries: 2
- Stats at Pro Football Reference

Joseph Peter Tafoya (born September 6, 1978) is an American former professional football player and entrepreneur. He played seven seasons as a defensive end/linebacker in the National Football League (NFL), before injuring his foot in training camp of 2008, upon which he retired. He was selected by Tony Dungy and the Tampa Bay Buccaneers in the seventh round of the 2001 NFL draft. Injured in the first pre-season game of his professional career with an ankle fracture, he was released on injury waivers and picked up by the Chicago Bears. He spent three seasons with the Chicago Bears and appeared in the 2001 NFC Divisional playoffs game against the Philadelphia Eagles where he recorded three tackles. Tafoya was picked up as a free agent by the Seattle Seahawks. He appeared in the 2005 Super Bowl against the Pittsburgh Steelers. He was then picked up as a free agent by the Arizona Cardinals in 2007 and released after he suffered a career-ending injury during the 2008 training camp.

Upon retirement he acquired a Mobile Entertainment company developing mobile applications focused on fan engagement. He was invited to speak at the 2011 AT&T Developers Conference as part of the AT&T Keynote Speech by CMO David Christopher on the topic of fan engagement through mobile technology.

In 2012 Tafoya and Carter launched JumpIt Media Inc. a sports marketing company centered on fan engagement. As the CEO of JumpIt Media Inc., Tafoya partnered with the Richard Sherman Family Foundation to Launch the Richard Sherman Celebrity Softball Game held July 7 at Cheney Stadium in Tacoma, Washington. Shortly after the Sherman event, Tafoya and JumpIt Media Inc. entered a joint venture partnership to promote the TM brands Volume 12 and Legion of Boom. He launched an awareness campaign to promote the unknown brand Volume 12 by inviting the Guinness World Records to CenturyLink Field to measure crowd roar in an effort to break the world record for "Loudest Crowd Roar at an outdoor Sports Stadium." On September 15 Seattle Seahawks fans (aka the 12th Man) were measured at 131.76 dBA, setting a new world record for crowd roar. The record was broken and then reclaimed on December 2 through the efforts of the Seahawks and Tafoya's JumpIt Media Inc. measured at 137.6dBA against the New Orleans Saints.

== NFL career statistics ==
Legend
**Bold**	Career high

=== Regular season ===
Year	Team	Games		Tackles					Interceptions					Fumbles			
Year	Team	GP	GS	Cmb	Solo	Ast	Sck	TFL	Int	Yds	TD	Lng	PD	FF	FR	Yds	TD
2001	CHI	5	0	1	1	0	0.0	0	0	0	0	0	0	0	0	0	0
2002	CHI	14	1	18	12	6	0.5	0	0	0	0	0	0	0	0	0	0
2003	CHI	**16**	0	25	20	5	0.0	3	0	0	0	0	0	0	0	0	0
2005	SEA	15	1	**33**	20	**13**	1.0	3	0	0	0	0	**1**	**1**	**1**	0	0
2006	SEA	13	0	12	8	4	0.0	0	0	0	0	0	**1**	0	**1**	0	0
2007	ARI	13	**7**	26	**22**	4	**2.0**	**4**	0	0	0	0	**1**	0	0	0	0
		76	9	115	83	32	3.5	10	0	0	0	0	3	1	2	0	0

=== Playoffs ===
Year	Team	Games		Tackles					Interceptions					Fumbles			
Year	Team	GP	GS	Cmb	Solo	Ast	Sck	TFL	Int	Yds	TD	Lng	PD	FF	FR	Yds	TD
2001	CHI	1	0	1	1	0	0.0	0	0	0	0	0	0	0	0	0	0
2005	SEA	**3**	0	**3**	**2**	**1**	0.0	0	0	0	0	0	0	0	0	0	0
2006	SEA	2	0	2	**2**	0	0.0	0	0	0	0	0	0	0	0	0	0
		6	0	6	5	1	0.0	0	0	0	0	0	0	0	0	0	0
