= Larry Whigham =

American football player (born 1972)

No. 25, 33
- Position: Safety

Personal information
- Born: June 23, 1972 (age 54); Hattiesburg, Mississippi, U.S.
- Listed height: 6 ft 2 in (1.88 m)
- Listed weight: 205 lb (93 kg)

Career information
- High school: Hattiesburg (MS)
- College: Louisiana-Monroe
- NFL draft: 1994: 4th round, 110th overall pick

Career history
- Seattle Seahawks (1994)*; New England Patriots (1994–2000); Chicago Bears (2001–2002)
- * Offseason or practice squad member only

Awards and highlights
- 2× First-team All-Pro (1997, 2001); 2× Pro Bowl (1997, 2001); New England Patriots All-1990s Team

Career NFL statistics
- Tackles: 184
- Interceptions: 4
- Sacks: 5
- Stats at Pro Football Reference

Larry Jerome Whigham (born June 23, 1972) is an American former professional football player who was a safety for nine seasons with the New England Patriots and Chicago Bears of the National Football League (NFL).

Whigham played college football for the Louisiana–Monroe Warhawks and was selected by the Seattle Seahawks in the fourth round (110th overall) of the 1994 NFL draft. He was known for his enthusiasm on the field and excelled in special teams play. He made the Pro Bowl twice as a special teams player, once with New England and once with Chicago.

In January 1997 he earned AFC Special Teams Player of the Week in the AFC Championship Game against Jacksonville when he tackled Jaguar punter Bryan Barker on his own four-yard line, which resulted in a touchdown for the Patriots a few plays later.

On September 21, 1997, Whigham picked up 2 sacks against Rick Mirer and the Chicago Bears.

While Whigham gained attention playing mostly special teams (he started only six games), he intercepted four passes during his career, three of which were against the NFL's all-time leading passer, Dan Marino. He intercepted two Marino passes versus Miami on November 23, 1997, including one he returned 60 yards for a touchdown, and finished the game with a season-high four tackles to earn Player of the Game honors.

He is married to Kenyatta Whigham and now resides in Houston, Texas.

== NFL career statistics ==
Legend
**Bold**	Career high

Year	Team	Games		Tackles				Interceptions				Fumbles			
Year	Team	GP	GS	Comb	Solo	Ast	Sck	Int	Yds	TD	Lng	FF	FR	Yds	TD
1994	NWE	12	0	2	2	0	0.0	1	21	0	21	0	0	0	0
1995	NWE	16	0	4	4	0	0.0	0	0	0	0	0	**1**	0	0
1996	NWE	16	1	15	9	6	0.0	0	0	0	0	0	**1**	0	0
1997	NWE	16	0	19	15	4	2.0	**2**	**60**	**1**	**60**	**1**	0	0	0
1998	NWE	16	0	25	22	3	0.0	1	0	0	0	0	0	0	0
1999	NWE	16	0	33	22	**11**	**3.0**	0	0	0	0	0	0	0	0
2000	NWE	14	4	**41**	**30**	**11**	0.0	0	0	0	0	0	0	0	0
2001	CHI	14	0	16	13	3	0.0	0	0	0	0	0	0	0	0
2002	CHI	16	1	29	24	5	0.0	0	0	0	0	0	0	0	0
		136	6	184	141	43	5.0	4	81	1	60	1	2	0	0
