= Paul Edinger =

American football player (born 1978)

No. 2, 1
- Position: Placekicker

Personal information
- Born: January 17, 1978 (age 48); Frankfort, Michigan, U.S.
- Listed height: 5 ft 8 in (1.73 m)
- Listed weight: 175 lb (79 kg)

Career information
- High school: Kathleen
- College: Michigan State (1996–1999)
- NFL draft: 2000: 6th round, 174th overall pick

Career history
- Chicago Bears (2000–2004); Minnesota Vikings (2005); Chicago Rush (2008); Jacksonville Sharks (2010); Pittsburgh Power (2011)

Awards and highlights
- 2× Second-team All-Big Ten (1998, 1999); NFL records: Highest extra point % in NFL history, minimum 150 extra point attempts: 100% (164/164)

Career NFL statistics
- Field goals made: 135
- Field goals attempted: 180
- Field goal %: 75%
- Extra points made: 164
- Extra points attempted: 164
- Extra point %: 100%
- Points: 569
- Longest field goal: 56
- Touchbacks: 11
- Stats at Pro Football Reference
- Stats at ArenaFan.com

Paul Edinger (born January 17, 1978) is an American former professional football player who was a placekicker in the National Football League (NFL). He was selected by the Chicago Bears in the sixth round of the 2000 NFL draft. He played college football for the Michigan State Spartans.

Edinger has also played for the Chicago Bears, Minnesota Vikings, Chicago Rush, and Jacksonville Sharks.

== Professional career ==
=== Chicago Bears ===
Edinger was drafted by the Chicago Bears in the sixth round (174th overall) in the 2000 NFL draft. He played five seasons with the team and set a personal best with an 83.9 field goal percentage in 2001. He kicked 62.5% in his last year with Chicago and was released. In five seasons with the Bears, Paul Edinger made 110 out of 146 (76.9%) field goals and made all of his 133 extra point attempts.

=== Minnesota Vikings ===
Edinger signed with the Minnesota Vikings as a free agent in 2005. His 56-yard game-winning field goal against the Green Bay Packers on October 23, 2005, was the longest ever in Vikings history, tied with Blair Walsh's 56-yard attempt against the Houston Texans in Week 16 of the 2012 season. The kick was also his personal long. This record was broken when Greg Joseph kicked a game-winning 61-yard field goal against the New York Giants in week 16 of the 2022 season. He was not re-signed following the season. In his only season as a Minnesota Viking, Edinger made 25 of 34 (73.5%) field goals and all of his 31 extra point attempts.

Edinger is in a two-way tie for most accurate extra point kicker in NFL history, a perfect 100%.

=== Chicago Rush ===
After being out of football since 2005, Edinger signed a three-year contract with the Chicago Rush of the Arena Football League. However, he was released a week later. He was re-signed on June 3, 2008, after the release of Rush kicker Dan Frantz. His next game, he pulled his groin before the game and spent the rest of the season on IR. He played one game for the Rush

=== Jacksonville Sharks ===
Edinger signed with the Jacksonville Sharks on January 2, 2010.

=== Pittsburgh Power ===
Edinger signed with the Pittsburgh Power on November 1, 2010.

== NFL career statistics ==
Legend
**Bold**	Career high

=== Regular season ===
Year	Team	GP	Overall FGs			PATs			Kickoffs				Total points
Year	Team	GP	FGA	FGM	Pct	XPA	XPM	Pct	KO	KOYds	Avg	TB	Total points
2000	CHI	16	27	21	77.8	21	21	100	58	3,472	59.9	**4**	84
2001	CHI	16	31	**26**	**83.9**	**34**	**34**	100	**73**	**4,404**	**60.3**	**4**	**112**
2002	CHI	16	28	22	78.6	29	29	100	67	4,002	59.7	2	95
2003	CHI	16	**36**	**26**	72.2	27	27	100	69	3,956	57.3	1	105
2004	CHI	16	24	15	62.5	22	22	100	56	3,285	58.7	0	67
2005	MIN	16	34	25	73.5	31	31	100	72	4,246	59.0	0	106
		96	180	135	75.0	164	164	100	395	23,365	59.2	11	569

=== Playoffs ===
Year	Team	GP	Overall FGs			PATs			Kickoffs				Total points
Year	Team	GP	FGA	FGM	Pct	XPA	XPM	Pct	KO	KOYds	Avg	TB	Total points
2001	CHI	**1**	**1**	**1**	**100**	**2**	**2**	**100**	**4**	**227**	**56.8**	0	**5**
		1	1	1	100	2	2	100	4	227	56.8	0	5

== Kicking style ==
Edinger is known for his unusual "corkscrew" kicking motion: before the snap he faces backwards in the direction of the opposite side of the field. As the ball is snapped he turns as he steps in a circular pattern toward the ball.
