= Alfonso Boone =

American football player (born 1976)

No. 70
- Position: Defensive end

Personal information
- Born: January 11, 1976 (age 50); Saginaw, Michigan, U.S.
- Listed height: 6 ft 3 in (1.91 m)
- Listed weight: 320 lb (145 kg)

Career information
- High school: Arthur Hill (Saginaw)
- College: Mt. San Antonio (1998–1999)
- NFL draft: 2000: 7th round, 253rd overall pick

Career history
- Detroit Lions (2000)*; Chicago Bears (2000–2006); Kansas City Chiefs (2007–2008); San Diego Chargers (2009–2010)
- * Offseason or practice squad member only

Career NFL statistics
- Total tackles: 194
- Sacks: 15.5
- Forced fumbles: 2
- Fumble recoveries: 3
- Pass deflections: 16
- Stats at Pro Football Reference

Alfonso D. Boone (born January 11, 1976) is an American former professional football player who was a defensive end for 10 seasons in the National Football League (NFL). He is the only player to be selected in the history of the NFL draft from a junior college. He was selected by the Detroit Lions in the seventh round of the 2000 NFL draft. He played college football at Mt. San Antonio College.

Boone has also played for the Chicago Bears and Kansas City Chiefs.

== Early life ==
Boone attended Arthur Hill High School in Saginaw, Michigan and was a letterman in football, basketball, and track and field graduating in 1995. Boone saw time as a fullback his sophomore season which went to the state championship game. He did not play his junior year. As a senior, he was nominated all-area honorable mention. Boone qualified for the state meet in the shot put.

Upon graduation, Boone enrolled at Central State University and was part of the team which won the 1995 NAIA Division I championship in 1995. The school folded the football team after his freshman year. After three years out of football, Boone enrolled at Mt. San Antonio College where he would earn all-American honors and Defensive Player of the Year All for the Mission Conference.

== NFL career statistics ==
Legend
**Bold**	Career high

=== Regular season ===
Year	Team	Games		Tackles					Interceptions					Fumbles			
Year	Team	GP	GS	Cmb	Solo	Ast	Sck	TFL	Int	Yds	TD	Lng	PD	FF	FR	Yds	TD
2001	CHI	11	0	13	11	2	2.0	3	0	0	0	0	1	0	**1**	**6**	0
2002	CHI	**16**	5	**32**	**28**	4	1.5	3	0	0	0	0	1	**1**	**1**	0	0
2003	CHI	**16**	6	31	27	4	1.0	2	0	0	0	0	3	0	0	0	0
2004	CHI	12	2	15	11	4	2.5	4	0	0	0	0	1	0	0	0	0
2005	CHI	**16**	1	18	12	6	1.5	2	0	0	0	0	2	0	0	0	0
2006	CHI	12	4	26	22	4	2.0	**6**	0	0	0	0	0	0	0	0	0
2007	KAN	15	**15**	26	19	7	1.0	4	0	0	0	0	**5**	0	**1**	0	0
2008	KAN	15	4	18	17	1	1.0	3	0	0	0	0	1	0	0	0	0
2009	SDG	13	4	15	7	**8**	**3.0**	2	0	0	0	0	2	**1**	0	0	0
2010	SDG	3	0	0	0	0	0.0	0	0	0	0	0	0	0	0	0	0
		129	41	194	154	40	15.5	29	0	0	0	0	16	2	3	6	0

=== Playoffs ===
Year	Team	Games		Tackles					Interceptions					Fumbles			
Year	Team	GP	GS	Cmb	Solo	Ast	Sck	TFL	Int	Yds	TD	Lng	PD	FF	FR	Yds	TD
2001	CHI	1	0	0	0	0	0.0	0	0	0	0	0	0	0	0	0	0
2005	CHI	1	0	0	0	0	0.0	0	0	0	0	0	0	0	0	0	0
2006	CHI	**3**	0	**2**	**2**	0	0.0	0	0	0	0	0	0	0	0	0	0
2009	SDG	1	0	1	1	0	0.0	0	0	0	0	0	0	0	0	0	0
		6	0	3	3	0	0.0	0	0	0	0	0	0	0	0	0	0
