= Mike Green (defensive back) =

American football player (born 1976)

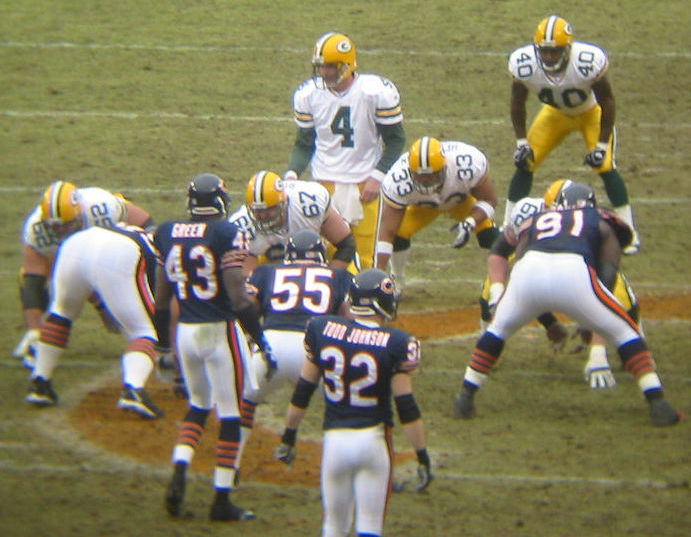
- Green (43) with the Chicago Bears in 2005

No. 43, 42, 25
- Positions: Safety, Cornerback

Personal information
- Born: December 6, 1976 (age 49); Ruston, Louisiana, U.S.
- Listed height: 6 ft 0 in (1.83 m)
- Listed weight: 195 lb (88 kg)

Career information
- High school: Ruston
- College: Northwestern State (1996–1999)
- NFL draft: 2000: 7th round, 254th overall pick

Career history
- Chicago Bears (2000–2005); Seattle Seahawks (2006–2007); Washington Redskins (2008)

Career NFL statistics
- Total tackles: 434
- Sacks: 6
- Forced fumbles: 7
- Pass deflections: 27
- Interceptions: 4
- Stats at Pro Football Reference

Michael Wayne Green (born December 6, 1976) is an American former professional football player who was a safety and cornerback in the National Football League (NFL). He played college football for the Northwestern State Demons and was selected by the Chicago Bears in the seventh round of the 2000 NFL draft.

Green also played for the Seattle Seahawks and the Washington Redskins. He retired in 2008.

== College career ==
Green attended college at Northwestern State University in Natchitoches, Louisiana. He earned four letters with the Demons from 1996 to 1999.

== Professional career ==
Pre-draft measurables
Height	Weight	Arm length	Hand span	40-yard dash	10-yard split	20-yard split	20-yard shuttle	Vertical jump	Broad jump
6 ft 0 1/8 in (1.83 m)	189 lb (86 kg)	31 7/8 in (0.81 m)	9 1/2 in (0.24 m)	4.54 s	1.59 s	2.64 s	4.20 s	38.5 in (0.98 m)	9 ft 10 in (3.00 m)
All values from NFL Combine

=== Chicago Bears ===
Green was the last player selected in the 2000 NFL draft, a spot which earns the drafted player the dubious distinction of "Mr. Irrelevant". Green played for the Chicago Bears from 2000 to 2005. During his career in Chicago he once recorded a 100-tackle season and was described as "a vital cog in the Bears' secondary."

=== Seattle Seahawks ===
Green was acquired by the Seattle Seahawks in an April 2006 trade with the Bears in exchange for a sixth round pick. On August 26, 2006, he suffered a lisfranc fracture and was placed on injured reserve. Green functioned as a backup safety and cornerback during the 2007 season. He was released from the Seahawks on July 25, 2008.

=== Washington Redskins ===
Green signed with the Washington Redskins on October 14, 2008, taking the roster spot of Reed Doughty, who was placed on the injured reserve after suffering a back injury. He was not re-signed following the end of the season making him a free agent.

== NFL career statistics ==
Legend
**Bold**	Career high

=== Regular season ===
Year	Team	Games		Tackles					Interceptions					Fumbles			
Year	Team	GP	GS	Cmb	Solo	Ast	Sck	TFL	Int	Yds	TD	Lng	PD	FF	FR	Yds	TD
2000	CHI	7	0	0	0	0	0.0	0	0	0	0	0	0	0	0	0	0
2001	CHI	**16**	2	70	64	6	**3.0**	2	0	0	0	0	4	**2**	1	0	0
2002	CHI	**16**	**16**	**130**	**100**	**30**	1.0	5	0	0	0	0	5	1	2	-1	0
2003	CHI	10	8	46	36	10	0.5	3	1	3	0	3	3	0	0	0	0
2004	CHI	**16**	**16**	110	86	24	1.5	**7**	**2**	0	0	0	**9**	**2**	**4**	**3**	0
2005	CHI	**16**	3	41	33	8	0.0	0	1	**14**	0	**14**	4	**2**	1	0	0
2007	SEA	15	1	17	15	2	0.0	0	0	0	0	0	1	0	0	0	0
2008	WAS	8	2	20	16	4	0.0	2	0	0	0	0	1	0	0	0	0
		104	48	434	350	84	6.0	19	4	17	0	14	27	7	8	2	0

=== Playoffs ===
Year	Team	Games		Tackles					Interceptions					Fumbles			
Year	Team	GP	GS	Cmb	Solo	Ast	Sck	TFL	Int	Yds	TD	Lng	PD	FF	FR	Yds	TD
2001	CHI	1	0	**4**	2	**2**	0.0	0	0	0	0	0	0	0	0	0	0
2005	CHI	1	0	**4**	**3**	1	0.0	**1**	0	0	0	0	0	0	0	0	0
2007	SEA	**2**	0	0	0	0	0.0	0	0	0	0	0	0	0	0	0	0
		4	0	8	5	3	0.0	1	0	0	0	0	0	0	0	0	0
