= John Davis (tight end) =

American football player (born 1973)

No. 87, 80, 86, 82
- Position: Tight end

Personal information
- Born: May 14, 1973 (age 53); Jasper, Texas, U.S.
- Listed height: 6 ft 4 in (1.93 m)
- Listed weight: 264 lb (120 kg)

Career information
- High school: Jasper
- College: Emporia State
- Supplemental draft: 1994: 5th round

Career history
- Dallas Cowboys (1994–1995); New Orleans Saints (1996)*; Tampa Bay Buccaneers (1997–1999); → Amsterdam Admirals (1997); Minnesota Vikings (2000); Chicago Bears (2001–2003)
- * Offseason or practice squad member only

Awards and highlights
- Honorable-mention All-MIAA (1993)

Career NFL statistics
- Games played: 81
- Receptions: 55
- Receiving yards: 517
- Receiving touchdowns: 6
- Stats at Pro Football Reference

John Leonard Davis (born May 14, 1973) is an American former professional football player who was a tight end in the National Football League for the Tampa Bay Buccaneers, Minnesota Vikings, and Chicago Bears. He played college football for the Emporia State Hornets. He also was a member of the Amsterdam Admirals in the World League of American Football.

== Early life ==
Davis attended Jasper High School, where he practiced football, basketball and track. He contributed in setting a national high school record with a time of 39.9 seconds in the 4 × 100 metres relay.

He enrolled at Cisco Junior College after graduation. In 1992, he transferred to Emporia State University. As a senior, he started at tight end and was moved to running back for the final 6 games of the season, registering 128 carries for 624 yards (4.9-yard average), 7 rushing touchdowns, 13 receptions for 172 yards (13.2-yard average ) and 2 receiving touchdowns.

== Professional career ==
=== Dallas Cowboys ===
Davis was selected by the Dallas Cowboys in the fifth round (second overall) of the 1994 Supplemental Draft. He was waived on August 28. On August 30, he was signed to the practice squad, where he spent the rest of the season.

In 1995, he was passed on the depth chart during training camp by rookies Eric Bjornson and Kendell Watkins. On October 31, he was released after spending the first 9 weeks of the season on injured reserve with an ankle injury.

=== New Orleans Saints ===
On June 3, 1996, he was signed by the New Orleans Saints. He was cut on August 12.

=== Tampa Bay Buccaneers ===
On January 22, 1997, he was signed by the Tampa Bay Buccaneers and allocated to the Amsterdam Admirals of the World League of American Football, where he collected 18 receptions for 217 yards and one touchdown as the starter at tight end. In the NFL regular season, he appeared in 8 games with 2 starts, after being declared inactive for the first 8 contests. He collected 3 receptions for 35 yards in the final four games.

In the next two seasons, he was the third-string tight end behind Dave Moore and Patrick Hape. In 1999, he contributed to a 14-13 playoff victory over the Washington Redskins, catching the winning touchdown with 7:29 minutes left.

=== Minnesota Vikings ===
On June 1, 2000, he signed as a free agent with the Minnesota Vikings. He appeared in 15 games (9 starts), tallying 17 receptions for 202 yards and one touchdown.

In July 2001, he suffered lacerations to his face in a car accident. On July 29, he was placed on the non-football-related injury active list. On August 13, his contract was terminated after he failed a physical.

=== Chicago Bears ===
On August 14, 2001, he was signed by the Chicago Bears, to provide depth after tight end Kaseem Sinceno was lost for the season with a fractured left ankle. He appeared in 16 games (7 starts), making 11 receptions for 68 yards and no touchdowns

In 2002, he appeared in 10 contests and started 8 games over Fred Baxter. He posted a career-high 20 receptions for 193 yards and 3 touchdowns, despite missing the final 5 contests after injuring his back against the Detroit Lions.

On August 12, 2003, he had surgery to remove a disc from his back. On August 24, he was placed on the physically-unable-to-perform list. On October 22, he was released after failing the team's physical with back and knee injuries.
