= Devin Lemons =

American football player (born 1979)

No. 59
- Position: Linebacker

Personal information
- Born: March 20, 1979 (age 47); Bryan, Texas, U.S.

Career information
- College: Texas Tech

Career history
- 2001-2002: Chicago Bears*
- 2003: Miami Dolphins*
- 2004: Washington Redskins
- * Offseason or practice squad member only
- Stats at Pro Football Reference

Devin Wayne Lemons (born March 20, 1979) is an American former professional football player who was a linebacker for the Washington Redskins of the National Football League. He was born in Bryan, Texas, and played college football for the Texas Tech Red Raiders.

Lemons now coaches football at Prosper High School in Prosper, Texas.
