= Bryan Robinson (American football, born 1974) =

American football player (1974–2016)

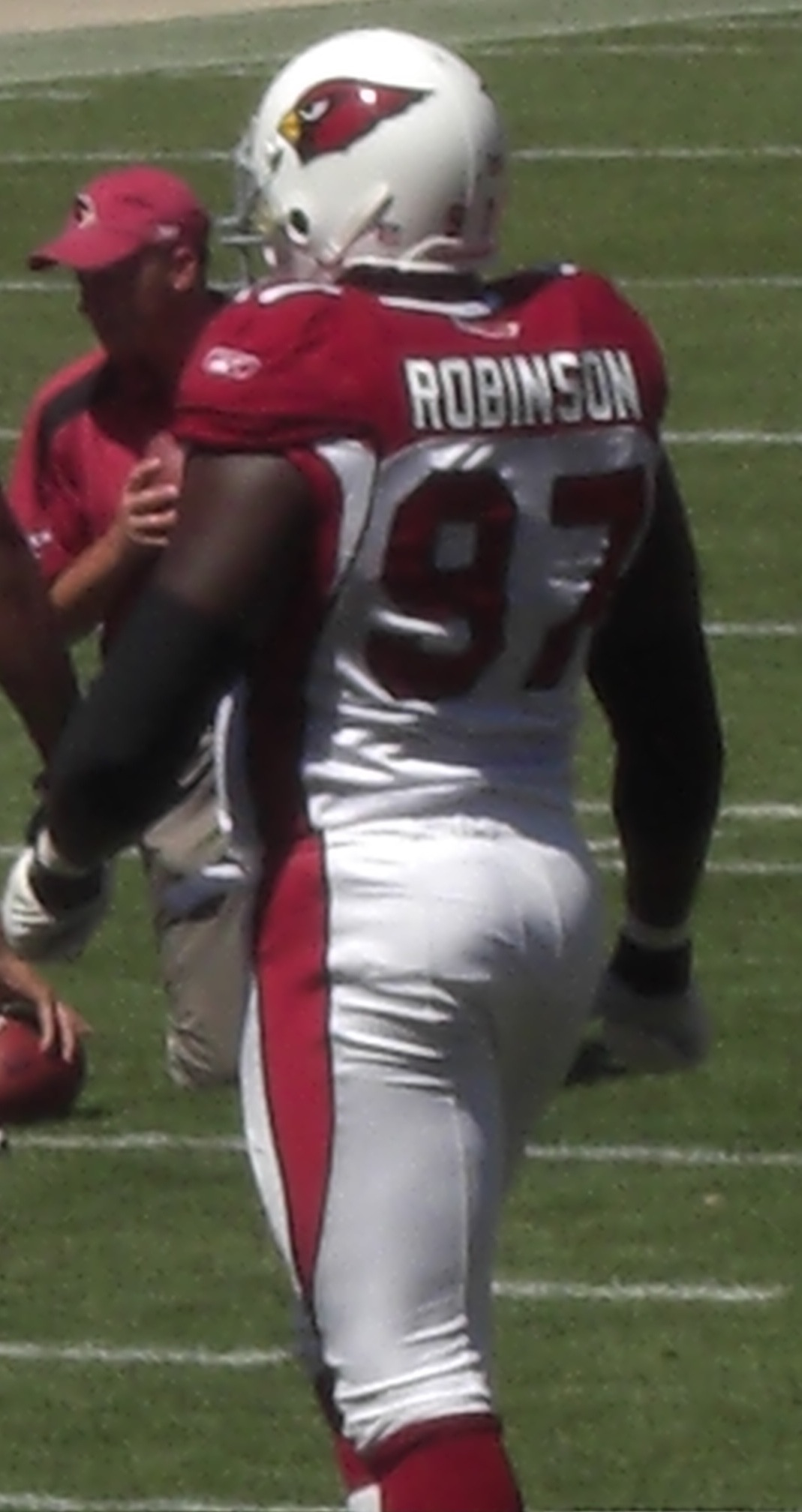
- Robinson with the Arizona Cardinals in 2008

No. 92, 98, 97
- Position: Defensive tackle

Personal information
- Born: June 22, 1974; Toledo, Ohio, U.S.
- Died: June 11, 2016 (aged 41); Milwaukee, Wisconsin, U.S.
- Listed height: 6 ft 4 in (1.93 m)
- Listed weight: 305 lb (138 kg)

Career information
- High school: Woodward (Toledo, Ohio)
- College: Fresno State
- NFL draft: 1997: undrafted

Career history
- St. Louis Rams (1997); Chicago Bears (1998–2003); Miami Dolphins (2004); Cincinnati Bengals (2005–2007); Arizona Cardinals (2008–2010)

Career NFL statistics
- Tackles: 429
- Sacks: 24
- Forced fumbles: 6
- Fumble recoveries: 2
- Passes defended: 39
- Stats at Pro Football Reference

Bryan Keith Robinson (June 22, 1974 – June 11, 2016), nicknamed "Big Dog", was an American professional football defensive tackle. He was originally signed by the St. Louis Rams as an undrafted free agent in 1997.

Robinson also played for the Chicago Bears, Miami Dolphins, Cincinnati Bengals, and Arizona Cardinals.

== College career ==
He began his college football career at College of the Desert in Palm Desert, CA. After College of the Desert, Robinson and Bill Hall beat Steve Sarkisian of El Camino College in the 1994 Southern California Bowl at College of the Desert. Robinson transferred to the Fresno State Bulldogs in 1995.

== Professional career ==
Pre-draft measurables
Height	Weight	Arm length	Hand span	40-yard dash	10-yard split	20-yard split	20-yard shuttle	Vertical jump	Broad jump	Bench press
6 ft 4 in (1.93 m)	283 lb (128 kg)	35 1/4 in (0.90 m)	9 1/4 in (0.23 m)	5.12 s	1.77 s	2.97 s	4.48 s	29.5 in (0.75 m)	9 ft 5 in (2.87 m)	20 reps

=== St. Louis Rams ===
Bryan Robinson played one season with the St. Louis Rams in 1997, after making the roster as an undrafted free agent.

=== Chicago Bears ===
Robinson made two of the most memorable plays in Chicago Bears history, the first one on November 7, 1999. Playing at Green Bay in the first Bears game since the death of Walter Payton, he blocked a 28-yard Ryan Longwell field goal attempt in the final seconds to preserve a 14–13 victory over the Packers and end the Bears 10 game losing streak against their rival. The second occurred on November 4, 2001, against the Cleveland Browns, in a game the Bears famously sent into overtime after being down two touchdowns with less than a minute left; in overtime, he batted a Tim Couch pass up into the air that Mike Brown would then catch and return for a game winning touchdown, the second week in a row he did that. He was waived on September 5, 2004. At the time of his release, he was the longest tenured player on the Chicago Bears defense.

=== Miami Dolphins ===
On September 7, 2004, Robinson signed a 1-year contract worth $1.5 million with the Miami Dolphins. He played in all 16 games and notched 41 tackles in his lone season with the Dolphins.

=== Cincinnati Bengals ===
On March 13, 2005, The Cincinnati Bengals signed Bryan Robinson to a 3-year contract worth $6 million, including a $1.7 million signing bonus.

=== Arizona Cardinals ===
On April 11, 2008, Robinson was signed by the Arizona Cardinals. He would go on to appear in his first Super Bowl when the Cardinals faced the Steelers in Super Bowl XLIII. The Cardinals would lose the game 27–23.

== NFL career statistics ==
Legend
**Bold**	Career high

=== Regular season ===
Year	Team	Games		Tackles				Interceptions				Fumbles			
Year	Team	GP	GS	Comb	Solo	Ast	Sck	Int	Yds	TD	Lng	FF	FR	Yds	TD
1997	STL	11	0	10	10	0	1.0	0	0	0	0	0	0	0	0
1998	CHI	11	5	18	11	7	0.5	0	0	0	0	0	0	0	0
1999	CHI	16	16	42	38	4	**5.0**	0	0	0	0	0	0	0	0
2000	CHI	16	16	51	42	9	4.5	0	0	0	0	0	0	0	0
2001	CHI	16	16	**56**	**46**	10	4.5	0	0	0	0	2	**1**	**1**	0
2002	CHI	15	13	35	29	6	1.0	0	0	0	0	**3**	0	0	0
2003	CHI	16	16	29	23	6	1.0	0	0	0	0	0	0	0	0
2004	MIA	16	13	41	24	**17**	0.0	0	0	0	0	0	0	0	0
2005	CIN	10	9	18	9	9	0.0	0	0	0	0	0	0	0	0
2006	CIN	16	16	42	29	13	3.0	0	0	0	0	0	0	0	0
2007	CIN	16	4	20	13	7	1.5	0	0	0	0	1	0	0	0
2008	ARI	16	15	20	16	4	1.0	0	0	0	0	0	0	0	0
2009	ARI	16	15	28	17	11	1.0	0	0	0	0	0	**1**	0	0
2010	ARI	16	16	19	13	6	0.0	0	0	0	0	0	0	0	0
Career		207	170	429	320	109	24.0	0	0	0	0	6	2	1	0

=== Playoffs ===
Year	Team	Games		Tackles				Interceptions				Fumbles			
Year	Team	GP	GS	Comb	Solo	Ast	Sck	Int	Yds	TD	Lng	FF	FR	Yds	TD
2001	CHI	1	1	0	0	0	0.0	0	0	0	0	0	0	0	0
2005	CIN	1	1	1	1	0	0.0	0	0	0	0	0	0	0	0
2008	ARI	4	4	**4**	**4**	0	0.0	0	0	0	0	0	0	0	0
2009	ARI	2	2	1	1	0	0.0	0	0	0	0	0	0	0	0
Career		8	8	6	6	0	0.0	0	0	0	0	0	0	0	0

== Death ==
On June 11, 2016, Robinson was found dead of hypertensive heart disease in a Milwaukee motel room.
