= Charlie Coiner =

American football coach

Biographical details
- Born: April 24, 1960 (age 66); Waynesboro, Virginia
- Education: Catawba College

Coaching career (HC unless noted)
- 1983–1986: Appalachian State (GA)
- 1987: Minnesota (DL/K)
- 1988–1990: Austin Peay (OL/DL)
- 1991–1993: Vanderbilt (ST)
- 1994: Texas Southern (ST)
- 1995–1997: Louisville (TE)
- 1998: Chattanooga (LB)
- 1999: LSU (ST)
- 2000: Texas Southern (OC/QB/ST)
- 2001–2003: Chicago Bears (off. assistant)
- 2004–2005: Chicago Bears (assistant ST)
- 2006–2009: Buffalo Bills (TE / assistant ST)
- 2010: North Carolina (def. assistant)
- 2012: Tennessee (SE/TE)

Charlie Coiner is an American football coach and the founder of 1st Down Technologies, LLC, a business based in Austin, Texas and founded on August 16, 2011, that produces mobile applications for football coaches. Coiner has worked as an assistant coach in the National Football League (NFL) with the Chicago Bears and the Buffalo Bills and in college football at a number of schools. Coiner was a defensive assistant on the North Carolina in 2010 which was the same season that the Tar Heels went to the Music City Bowl. His most recent coaching job was as the tight ends and special teams coach at the University of Tennessee.

During his time coaching in the NFL, Coiner noticed that other coaches were utilizing a small portion of a popular engineering tool to draw American football plays. This resulted in a lot of wasted time. His inability to find a better coaching tool lead to the creation of the FirstDown PlayBook.

FirstDown PlayBook is a digital football playbook that gives coaches access to over 35,000 editable football plays as well as other coaching tools. Coiner's goal was to make NFL-level tools accessible to coaches at every level of the game.

In 2015, Coiner launched his first installment of FirstDown PlayBook.
