= Todd McMillon =

American gridiron football player (born 1974)

No. 9, 26, 31
- Position: Cornerback

Personal information
- Born: September 26, 1974 (age 52); Bellflower, California, U.S.
- Listed height: 5 ft 11 in (1.80 m)
- Listed weight: 188 lb (85 kg)

Career information
- High school: Cerritos (CA)
- College: Northern Arizona
- NFL draft: 1996: undrafted

Career history
- Saskatchewan Roughriders (1997–1999); Chicago Bears (2000–2004); → Frankfurt Galaxy (2001)

Awards and highlights
- NFL Europe All-Pro (2001); All-Big Sky (1995)

Career NFL statistics
- Tackles: 74
- Fumble recoveries: 2
- Passes defended: 5
- Stats at Pro Football Reference

Todd Merlin McMillon (born September 26, 1974) is an American former professional football player who was a cornerback for the Chicago Bears of the National Football League (NFL). He played college football for the Northern Arizona Lumberjacks before being signed as an undrafted free agent. He also spent three years with the Saskatchewan Roughriders of the CFL. In 2001, he played for the Frankfurt Galaxy of NFL Europe and earned NFL Europe All-Pro honors.

McMillon models for such retailers as the GAP in his spare time, which has earned him the nickname "Runway" with his teammates. He also appeared on an episode of Teammates on ESPN with teammate Brian Urlacher.

In June 2013, McMillon was told by his doctor that he had prostate cancer, and stated, "When he told me I was positive for cancer, I just went numb. I thought he had the wrong test. I played in the NFL. I am super healthy. I work out all the time, so I am in really good shape. I was like, 'This can't be me. I'm only 39 and I have prostate cancer?'" In August, McMillon had his prostate removed, which had contained the disease.
