= Earle Mosley =

American football coach

Personal information
- Born: December 20, 1946 (age 79); Darby, Pennsylvania

Career information
- College: West Chester

Career history
- Rutgers (1980–1983) Defensive back coach; Northwestern (1984–1987) Defensive back coach; Temple (1988–1991) Defensive line coach; Notre Dame (1992–1996) Running backs coach; Stanford (1997–1998) Running backs coach; Chicago Bears (1999–2005) Running backs coach; Kansas (2006) Running backs coach; New York Sentinels (2009) Running backs coach

Earle Mosley (born December 20, 1946) is an American former football coach who most recently was the running backs coach for the New York Sentinels of the United Football League.
