= Dustin Lyman =

American business executive and football player (born 1976)

No. 89
- Position: Tight end

Personal information
- Born: August 5, 1976 (age 50); Boulder, Colorado, U.S.
- Listed height: 6 ft 4 in (1.93 m)
- Listed weight: 245 lb (111 kg)

Career information
- High school: Fairview (Boulder)
- College: Wake Forest
- NFL draft: 2000: 3rd round, 87th overall pick

Career history
- Chicago Bears (2000–2004)

Awards and highlights
- First-team All-ACC (1999)

Career NFL statistics
- Receiving yards: 278
- Receiving touchdowns: 3
- Stats at Pro Football Reference

Dustin Bopper Lyman (born August 5, 1976) is an American business executive and former football player. He is the current President and GM of Copper Mountain Ski Resort in Colorado and former chief executive officer of Famous Brands International. Lynam played professionally as a tight end in the National Football League (NFL). He was selected in the third round of the 2000 NFL draft out of Wake Forest University by the Chicago Bears with whom he played for five seasons.
