= Fred Baxter =

American football player (born 1971)

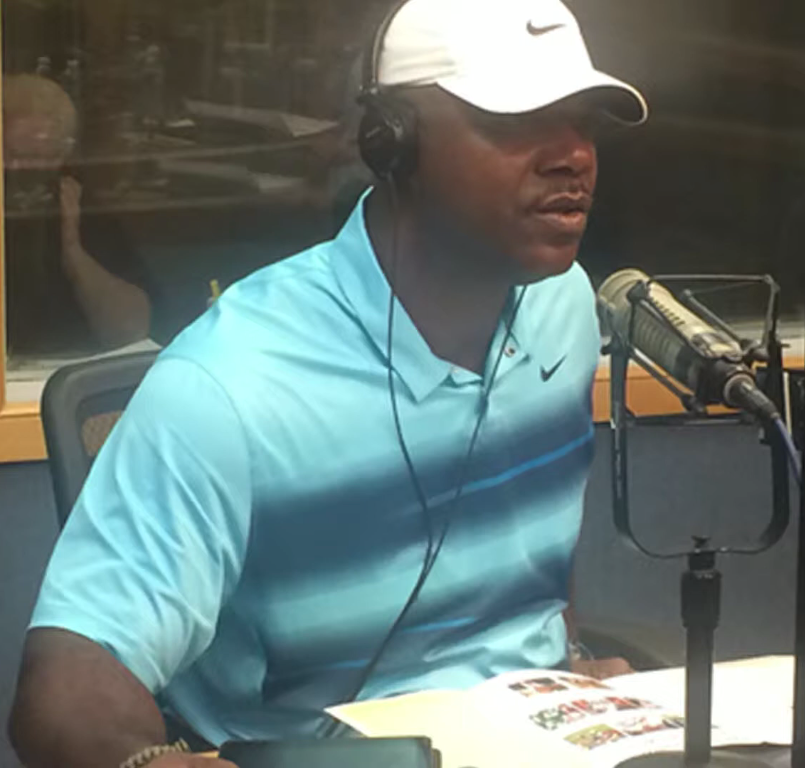
- Baxter in 2015

No. 84, 49
- Position: Tight end

Personal information
- Born: June 14, 1971 (age 55); Brundidge, Alabama, U.S.
- Listed height: 6 ft 3 in (1.91 m)
- Listed weight: 268 lb (122 kg)

Career information
- High school: Pike County (AL)
- College: Auburn
- NFL draft: 1993: 5th round, 115th overall pick

Career history
- New York Jets (1993–2000); Chicago Bears (2001–2002); New England Patriots (2002–2003); Washington Redskins (2004)

Awards and highlights
- Super Bowl champion (XXXVIII)

Career NFL statistics
- Receptions: 100
- Receiving yards: 1,008
- Receiving touchdowns: 12
- Stats at Pro Football Reference

Frederick Denard Baxter (born June 14, 1971) is an American former professional football player who was a tight end for 11 seasons in the National Football League (NFL). He played college football for the Auburn Tigers and was selected by the New York Jets in the fifth round of the 1993 NFL draft. Baxter played in the NFL for the Jets, Chicago Bears and New England Patriots. He was born in Brundidge, Alabama.
