= Reggie Austin (American football) =

American football player (born 1977)

No. 39, 24
- Position: Cornerback

Personal information
- Born: January 21, 1977 (age 49); Atlanta, Georgia, U.S.
- Listed height: 5 ft 9 in (1.75 m)
- Listed weight: 175 lb (79 kg)

Career information
- High school: C. L. Harper
- College: Wake Forest
- NFL draft: 2000: 4th round, 125th overall pick

Career history
- Chicago Bears (2000–2002); Minnesota Vikings (2004)*; Seattle Seahawks (2006)*
- * Offseason or practice squad member only

Career NFL statistics
- Tackles: 22
- Interceptions: 2
- Stats at Pro Football Reference

Reginald Antonio Austin (born January 21, 1977) is an American former professional football player who was a cornerback for three seasons for the Chicago Bears of the National Football League (NFL). He played college football for the Wake Forest Demon Deacons and was a fourth round selection (125th overall pick) in the 2000 NFL draft. He played mostly as a backup.

== Career ==
In 2002, Austin's first game was in a September 22 game against the New Orleans Saints.
