= Mike Gandy =

American football player (born 1979)

No. 69
- Position: Offensive tackle

Personal information
- Born: January 3, 1979 (age 47); Rockford, Illinois, U.S.
- Listed height: 6 ft 4 in (1.93 m)
- Listed weight: 316 lb (143 kg)

Career information
- High school: Garland (Garland, Texas)
- College: Notre Dame
- NFL draft: 2001: 3rd round, 68th overall pick

Career history
- Chicago Bears (2001–2004); Buffalo Bills (2005–2006); Arizona Cardinals (2007–2009)

Career NFL statistics
- Games played: 108
- Games started: 106
- Fumble recoveries: 3
- Stats at Pro Football Reference

Michael Joseph Gandy (born January 3, 1979) is an American former professional football player who was an offensive tackle in the National Football League (NFL). He was selected by the Chicago Bears in the third round of the 2001 NFL draft and later played for the Buffalo Bills and Arizona Cardinals. He played college football for the Notre Dame Fighting Irish.

== Professional career ==
=== Chicago Bears ===
He was drafted by the Chicago Bears in the third round of the 2001 NFL draft and played with the team for four seasons.

=== Buffalo Bills ===
After the 2004 NFL season, Gandy signed with the Buffalo Bills, remaining with the team through the 2006 season.

=== Arizona Cardinals ===
On April 2, 2007, he signed with the Arizona Cardinals. After aggravating a pelvic/groin injury against the Titans in week 11 of the 2009 season that turned out to be season-ending, he was placed on injured reserve and released by the team after the season.
