= Rex Norris (American football) =

American football player and coach (born 1939)

Biographical details
- Born: December 10, 1939 (age 86); Tipton, Indiana, U.S.

Playing career
- 1959–1960: San Angelo
- 1961–1962: East Texas State
- Position: Linebacker

Coaching career (HC unless noted)
- 1964–1969: R. L. Turner HS (TX) (assistant)
- 1970–1971: Navarro (assistant)
- 1972: Texas A&M (assistant)
- 1973–1977: Oklahoma (DL)
- 1978–1980: Oklahoma (DC)
- 1981–1983: Oklahoma (assistant HC)
- 1984: Arizona State (DL)
- 1985–1987: Detroit Lions (DL)
- 1988–1989: Florida (DL)
- 1990–1991: Tennessee (DL)
- 1992–1993: Texas (DL)
- 1994: Denver Broncos (DL)
- 1995–1996: Houston Oilers (DL)
- 1997–1998: Tennessee Oilers (DL)
- 1999–2002: Chicago Bears (DL)
- 2004–2005: Amsterdam Admirals (DL)
- 2006: Amsterdam Admirals (co-DC/DL)
- 2009: Toronto Argonauts (DL)

Rex Norris (born December 10, 1939) is a former college linebacker who has coached college football and National Football League (NFL) teams during the past 40 years.

Norris has a long history of coaching football teams. After playing the position of linebacker himself, Norris moved on to coaching college football. In 1972 already, he was coaching Texas A&M. One year later he moved on to take up the position of assistant coach for Barry Switzer at Oklahoma. He served at Oklahoma for a total of 11 seasons (1973–1983), filling the positions of defensive coordinator for the years, defensive line coach and assistant head coach during his final three years there. Coaching the Sooners, Rex Norris produced seven first-team All Americans and helped them reach eight Bowl games.

After Oklahoma, Norris moved on to Arizona State for one season (1984). The next season Norris made the switch from college football to the NFL when took a job at the Detroit Lions (1985–1987). After the Lions he returned to college football at Florida (1988–1989), Tennessee (1990–1991) and Texas (1992–1993).

In 1994, Norris once again made the switch to the NFL, this time with the Denver Broncos, followed by the Tennessee Oilers (1995–1998) and finally the Chicago Bears. Norris enjoyed a successful period in Chicago in 2001 when his defensive line helped establish a run defense that ranked second in the NFL and first in the National Football Conference (NFC) in rushing yards allowed per game. His defensive line give up just 82.1 yards per game. Furthermore, the 2001 Chicago Bears only surrendered three runs exceeding 20 yards all season and only six rushing touchdowns. In 2003, Norris stepped down as defensive line coach at the Bears to pursue other coaching opportunities closer to home.

However, in 2004, Norris moved continents to coach in the NFL Europa league, replacing Darryl Sims as defensive line coach at the Amsterdam Admirals. In 2005, he was the defensive coordinator at Amsterdam together with Richard Kent.

Altogether, Norris has over 40 years of coaching experience, with 12 of those years coaching in the NFL.
