= Bernard Robertson =

American football player (born 1979)

No. 74
- Position: Offensive tackle

Personal information
- Born: June 9, 1979 (age 47); New Orleans, Louisiana, U.S.
- Listed height: 6 ft 3 in (1.91 m)
- Listed weight: 310 lb (141 kg)

Career information
- High school: Edna Karr (New Orleans)
- College: Tulane
- NFL draft: 2001: 5th round, 138th overall pick

Career history
- Chicago Bears (2001–2002); Buffalo Bills (2003); Arizona Cardinals (2004)*; Oakland Raiders (2004)*
- * Offseason or practice squad member only

Career NFL statistics
- Games played: 15
- Games started: 5
- Stats at Pro Football Reference

Bernard H. Robertson, III. (born June 9, 1979) is an American former professional football player who was an offensive tackle in the National Football League (NFL). He played college football for the Tulane Green Wave and was selected by the Chicago Bears in the fifth round of the 2001 NFL draft with the 138th overall pick. He played two years for the Bears and for the Buffalo Bills in 2003.

After the NFL, he has worked in financial services, working at firms including Legg Mason, Citigroup, Merrill Lynch, and Raymond James. He is now a registered investment adviser with the firm of Hacket Robertson Tobe Group.
