= 2000 Minnesota Vikings season =

NFL team season

- Owner: Red McCombs
- General manager: Dennis Green
- Head coach: Dennis Green
- Offensive coordinator: Sherman Lewis
- Defensive coordinator: Emmitt Thomas
- Home stadium: Hubert H. Humphrey Metrodome

Results
- Record: 11–5
- Division place: 1st NFC Central
- Playoffs: Won Divisional Playoffs (vs. Saints) 34–16; Lost NFC Championship (at Giants) 0–41
- All-Pros: WR Randy Moss; RB Robert Smith
- Pro Bowlers: C Matt Birk; WR Cris Carter; QB Daunte Culpepper; S Robert Griffith; WR Randy Moss; RB Robert Smith; T Korey Stringer

Uniform
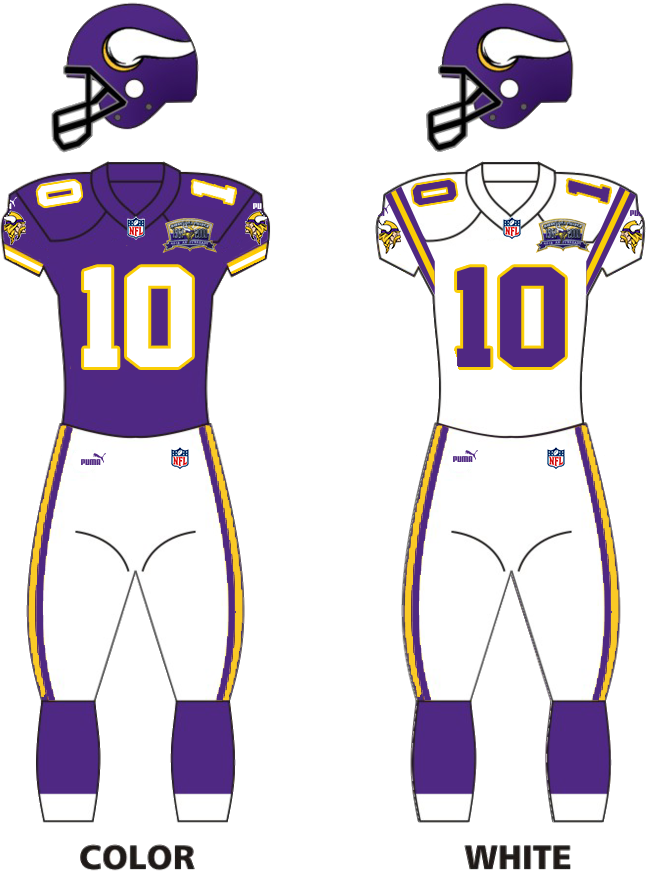

The 2000 season was the Minnesota Vikings' 40th in the National Football League (NFL). They won the NFC Central division title with an 11–5 record. After not retaining either Randall Cunningham or Jeff George, the team was led by first-year starting quarterback Daunte Culpepper and running back Robert Smith, who ran for a then team record 1,521 yards and seven touchdowns. The Vikings started out 7–0 and were 11–2 after 14 weeks, but slumped briefly, losing their last three to the St. Louis Rams, Green Bay Packers and Indianapolis Colts while Culpepper was hampered by injury.

After easily beating the New Orleans Saints in the Divisional game 34–16, they were defeated 41–0 by the New York Giants in the Conference Championship. Running back Robert Smith retired at the end of the year, after only playing eight NFL seasons. It would be 2004 before the Vikings returned to the playoffs.

After a contract dispute, Hall of Fame defensive tackle John Randle was let go after 11 seasons with the Vikings. Randle had only eight sacks this year, ending a streak of eight consecutive seasons with 10+ sacks.

Seven Vikings including Culpepper, Moss, Carter, Smith, Korey Stringer, Robert Griffith and Matt Birk were selected to play in the Pro Bowl after the season. It was Stringer's only Pro Bowl appearance before his death in 2001.

This would be the final full season for Dennis Green as the team's head coach, he was fired the next season with just one game remaining on the schedule.

== Offseason ==
| Additions | Subtractions |
|---|---|
| T Brad Badger (Redskins) | QB Randall Cunningham (Cowboys) |
| QB Bubby Brister (Broncos) | QB Jeff George (Redskins) |
| TE Johnny McWilliams (Cardinals) | TE Andrew Glover (Saints) |
| DE Bryce Paup (Jaguars) | G Randall McDaniel (Buccaneers) |
| LB Craig Sauer (Falcons) | C Jeff Christy (Buccaneers) |
| CB Cris Dishman (Chiefs) | WR Jake Reed (Saints) |
| LB Lemanski Hall (Cowboys) | DE Duane Clemons (Chiefs) |
| | CB Jimmy Hitchcock (Panthers) |
| | LB Rob Holmberg (Patriots) |

=== 2000 draft ===
2000 Minnesota Vikings Draft
| Draft order | | Player name | Position | College | Notes |
| Round | Selection | Player name | Position | College | Notes |
|---|---|---|---|---|---|
| 1 | 25 | Chris Hovan | Defensive tackle | Boston College | |
| 2 | 55 | Fred Robbins | Defensive tackle | Wake Forest | |
| 2 | 56 | Michael Boireau | Defensive end | Miami (FL) | From Redskins (Note: The Vikings traded QB Brad Johnson to the Redskins in exchange for a second-round selection (56th overall) and 1999 first- and third-round selections (11th and 73rd overall).) |
| 3 | 88 | Doug Chapman | Running back | Marshall | |
| 4 | 106 | Antonio Wilson | Linebacker | Texas A&M | From Ravens (Note: The details of these trades are unknown, but may involve Baltimore's acquisition of C Everett Lindsay from Minnesota.) |
| 4 | 118 | Tyrone Carter | Safety | Minnesota | |
| 5 | 155 | Surrendered to the Washington Redskins (Note: The Vikings surrendered a fifth-round selection (155th overall) to the Redskins as compensation for restricted free agent G Brad Badger.) | | | |
| 5 | 165 | Troy Walters | Wide receiver | Stanford | Compensatory pick |
| 6 | 191 | Traded to the Baltimore Ravens | | | |
| 7 | 232 | Traded to the Cleveland Browns (Note: The Vikings traded their seventh-round selection (232nd overall) to the Browns in exchange for DT Jerry Ball.) | | | |
| 7 | 240 | Mike Malano | Center | San Diego State | Compensatory pick |
| 7 | 244 | Giles Cole | Tight end | Texas | Compensatory pick |
| 7 | 248 | Lewis Kelly | Guard | South Carolina State | Compensatory pick |

=== Undrafted free agents ===
2000 undrafted free agents of note
| Player | Position | College |
|---|---|---|
| Billy Cockerham | Quarterback | Minnesota |
| Andy Crosland | Kicker | Miami (FL) |
| Tim Engelhardt | Defensive tackle | New Mexico State |
| Brody Liddiard | Tight end | Colorado |
| Lenny Lucas | Fullback | Troy State |
| Matt Wilson | Wide receiver | Bloomsburg |
| Antwone Young | Fullback | San Diego State |

== Staff ==
2000 Minnesota Vikings staff
| Front office: Owner – Red McCombs; President – Gary Woods; Director of football administration – Rob Brzezinski; Head coaches: Head coach/General manager – Dennis Green; Assistant head coach/defensive backs – Richard Solomon; Offensive coaches: Offensive coordinator – Sherman Lewis; Quarterbacks – Alex Wood; Running backs –Carl Hargrave; Wide receivers – Charlie Baggett; Tight ends – John Tice; Offensive line – Mike Tice; Quality control (offense) – Dean Dalton | Defensive coaches: Defensive coordinator – Emmitt Thomas; Defensive line – Fred von Appen; Inside linebackers – Trent Walters; Outside linebackers – John Fontes; Defensive quality control – Chuck Knox Jr.; Special teams coaches: Special teams – Gary Zauner; Strength and conditioning: Strength and conditioning – Steve Wetzel; Assistant strength and conditioning – Daryl Lawrence |

== Roster ==
2000 Minnesota Vikings roster
| Quarterbacks (QB): 8 Todd Bouman; 6 Bubby Brister; 11 Daunte Culpepper; Running backs (RB): 34 Doug Chapman; 40 Jim Kleinsasser FB; 33 Harold Morrow FB; 22 David Palmer; 26 Robert Smith; 21 Moe Williams KR; Wide receivers (WR): 80 Cris Carter; 89 Matthew Hatchette; 83 Nate Jacquet; 84 Randy Moss; 81 Chris Walsh; 82 Troy Walters; Tight ends (TE): 86 John Davis; 85 Andrew Jordan; 87 Johnny McWilliams | Offensive linemen (OL): 74 Brad Badger G/T; 78 Matt Birk C; 71 David Dixon G; 63 Corbin Lacina G; 76 Chris Liwienski G/T; 73 Todd Steussie T; 77 Korey Stringer T; 60 Cory Withrow C; Defensive linemen (DL): 91 John Burrough DE; 99 Chris Hovan DT; 95 Bryce Paup DE; 93 John Randle DE/DT; 98 Fred Robbins DT; 97 Talance Sawyer DE; 92 Fernando Smith DE; 94 Tony Williams DT | Linebackers (LB): 50 Pete Bercich MLB; 55 Lemanski Hall OLB; 58 Ed McDaniel OLB; 56 Jim Nelson OLB; 90 Gabe Northern OLB; 57 Dwayne Rudd OLB; 54 Antonio Wilson OLB; 52 Kailee Wong MLB; Defensive backs (DB): 30 Antonio Banks CB; 37 Tyrone Carter FS/KR; 24 Robert Griffith SS; 29 Wasswa Serwanga CB; 28 Robert Tate CB; 27 Keith Thibodeaux CB; 42 Orlando Thomas FS; 20 Kenny Wright CB; Special teams (ST): 1 Gary Anderson K; 17 Mitch Berger P; 51 Mitch Palmer LS | Practice squad: 48 Matt Cercone TE; 5 Billy Cockerham QB; 67 Jay Humphrey T; 31 Don Morgan CB; 68 Nick O'Brien G; Reserve: 96 Michael Boireau DE (IR); 61 Lewis Kelly T (IR); 69 Mike Malano G (IR); 59 Craig Sauer LB (IR); Rookies in italics 53 active, 4 reserve, 5 practice squad |

== Preseason ==
=== Schedule ===
| Week | Date | Opponent | Result | Record | Venue | Attendance | NFL.com recap |
|---|---|---|---|---|---|---|---|
| 1 | August 5 | New Orleans Saints | L 24–25 | 0–1 | Hubert H. Humphrey Metrodome | 63,445 | Recap |
| 2 | August 12 | at San Diego Chargers | L 7–31 | 0–2 | Qualcomm Stadium | 43,805 | Recap |
| 3 | August 18 | Arizona Cardinals | W 35–17 | 1–2 | Hubert H. Humphrey Metrodome | 63,563 | Recap |
| 4 | August 24 | at Indianapolis Colts | L 30–32 | 1–3 | RCA Dome | 51,337 | Recap |

=== Game summaries ===
==== Week 1: vs. New Orleans Saints ====
Week 1: New Orleans Saints at Minnesota Vikings

| Quarter | 1 | 2 | 3 | 4 | Total |
|---|---|---|---|---|---|
| Saints | 7 | 3 | 3 | 12 | 25 |
| Vikings | 0 | 14 | 7 | 3 | 24 |

at Hubert H. Humphrey Metrodome, Minneapolis, Minnesota

- Date: August 5
- Game time: 7:00 p.m. CST
- Game weather: None (indoor stadium)
- Game attendance: 63,445
- Referee: Larry Nemmers (20)
- Recap, Game Book

Game information

First quarter

- NO – Jake Reed 12-yard pass from Jeff Blake (Doug Brien kick), 7:21. Saints 7–0. Drive: 10 plays, 62 yards, 4:21.

Second quarter

- MIN – Moe Williams 24-yard pass from Daunte Culpepper (Gary Anderson kick), 8:42. Tied 7–7. Drive: 4 plays, 34 yards, 2:17.
- MIN – Jim Kleinsasser 2-yard run (Gary Anderson kick), 5:20. Vikings 14–7. Drive: 5 plays, 53 yards, 1:37.
- NO – Doug Brien 36-yard field goal, 0:00. Vikings 14–10. Drive: 5 plays, 28 yards, 1:08.

Third quarter

- NO – Doug Brien 24-yard field goal, 7:52. Vikings 14–13. Drive: 7 plays, 26 yards, 4:16.
- MIN – Doug Chapman 4-yard run (Andy Crosland kick), 0:13. Vikings 21–13. Drive: 14 plays, 80 yards, 7:39.

Fourth quarter

- NO – Lamont Hall 6-yard pass from Jake Delhomme (pass failed), 9:37. Vikings 21–19. Drive: 11 plays, 69 yards, 5:36.
- NO – Doug Brien 23-yard field goal, 4:18. Saints 22–21. Drive: 9 plays, 56 yards, 4:14.
- MIN – Gary Anderson 40-yard field goal, 1:29. Vikings 24–22. Drive: 11 plays, 50 yards, 2:49.
- NO – Doug Brien 49-yard field goal, 0:00. Saints 25–24. Drive: 5 plays, 29 yards, 1:29.

Top passers

- NO – Jeff Blake – 5/15, 74 yards, TD, INT
- MIN – Daunte Culpepper – 8/14, 140 yards, TD, INT

Top rushers

- NO – Chad Morton – 8 rushes, 32 yards
- MIN – Robert Smith – 8 rushes, 32 yards

Top receivers

- NO – Chad Morton – 4 receptions, 41 yards
- MIN – Randy Moss – 2 receptions, 68 yards

==== Week 2: at San Diego Chargers ====
Week 2: Minnesota Vikings at San Diego Chargers

| Quarter | 1 | 2 | 3 | 4 | Total |
|---|---|---|---|---|---|
| Vikings | 0 | 7 | 0 | 0 | 7 |
| Chargers | 0 | 14 | 10 | 7 | 31 |

at Qualcomm Stadium, San Diego, California

- Date: August 12
- Game time: 7:00 p.m. PST
- Game weather: Clear and sunny, 81 °F (27 °C)
- Game attendance: 43,805
- Referee: Mike Carey (94)
- Recap, Game Book

Game information

First quarter

- No scoring plays.

Second quarter

- MIN – Randy Moss 24-yard pass from Daunte Culpepper (Gary Anderson kick), 7:59. Vikings 7–0. Drive: 12 plays, 90 yards, 6:07.
- SD – Ronney Jenkins 86-yard kickoff return (John Carney kick), 7:44. Tied 7–7. Drive: 0 plays, 0 yards, 0:15.
- SD – Robert Chancey 1-yard run (John Carney kick), 4:59. Chargers 14–7. Drive: 3 plays, 5 yards, 1:44.

Third quarter

- SD – José Cortez 22-yard field goal, 4:58. Chargers 17–7. Drive: 15 plays, 72 yards, 6:08.
- SD – Reggie Davis 7-yard pass from Moses Moreno (José Cortez kick), 0:40. Chargers 24–7. Drive: 5 plays, 31 yards, 2:02.

Fourth quarter

- SD – Ronney Jenkins 2-yard run (José Cortez kick), 9:33. Chargers 31–7. Drive: 7 plays, 80 yards, 3:24.

Top passers

- MIN – Daunte Culpepper – 12/23, 129 yards, TD, 2 INT
- SD – Moses Moreno – 6/8, 82 yards, TD, INT

Top rushers

- MIN – Moe Williams – 6 rushes, 28 yards
- SD – Ronney Jenkins – 10 rushes, 69 yards, TD

Top receivers

- MIN – Randy Moss – 6 receptions, 89 yards, TD
- SD – Pat Batteaux – 2 receptions, 46 yards

==== Week 3: vs. Arizona Cardinals ====
Week 3: Arizona Cardinals at Minnesota Vikings

| Quarter | 1 | 2 | 3 | 4 | Total |
|---|---|---|---|---|---|
| Cardinals | 0 | 3 | 7 | 7 | 17 |
| Vikings | 7 | 21 | 7 | 0 | 35 |

at Hubert H. Humphrey Metrodome, Minneapolis, Minnesota

- Date: August 18
- Game time: 8:20 p.m. CST
- Game weather: None (indoor stadium)
- Game attendance: 63,563
- Referee: Bernie Kukar (86)
- Recap, Game Book

Game information

First quarter

- MIN – Robert Smith 6-yard run (Gary Anderson kick), 4:38. Vikings 7–0. Drive: 6 plays, 76 yards, 2:56.

Second quarter

- MIN – Robert Smith 12-yard run (Gary Anderson kick), 10:46. Vikings 14–0. Drive: 14 plays, 90 yards, 6:09.
- MIN – Randy Moss 54-yard pass from Daunte Culpepper (Gary Anderson kick), 8:14. Vikings 21–0. Drive: 2 plays, 55 yards, 0:48.
- MIN – Cris Carter 67-yard pass from Daunte Culpepper (Gary Anderson kick), 5:57. Vikings 28–0. Drive: 3 plays, 72 yards, 0:50.
- ARI – Cary Blanchard 49-yard field goal, 1:55. Vikings 28–3. Drive: 9 plays, 44 yards, 4:02.

Third quarter

- MIN – Moe Williams 1-yard run (Andy Crosland kick), 8:25. Vikings 35–3. Drive: 9 plays, 62 yards, 4:26.
- ARI – Thomas Jones 4-yard run (Cary Blanchard kick), 3:46. Vikings 35–10. Drive: 9 plays, 57 yards, 4:39.

Fourth quarter

- ARI – Mac Cody 12-yard pass from Dave Brown (Cary Blanchard kick), 11:09. Vikings 35–17. Drive: 11 plays, 85 yards, 5:08.

Top passers

- ARI – Jake Plummer – 13/24, 143 yards
- MIN – Daunte Culpepper – 13/23, 311 yards, 2 TD

Top rushers

- ARI – Thomas Jones – 11 rushes, 32 yards, TD
- MIN – Robert Smith – 8 rushes, 53 yards, 2 TD

Top receivers

- ARI – David Boston – 6 receptions, 68 yards
- MIN – Randy Moss – 5 receptions, 164 yards, TD

==== Week 4: at Indianapolis Colts ====
Week 4: Minnesota Vikings at Indianapolis Colts

| Quarter | 1 | 2 | 3 | 4 | Total |
|---|---|---|---|---|---|
| Vikings | 7 | 0 | 10 | 13 | 30 |
| Colts | 10 | 3 | 7 | 12 | 32 |

at RCA Dome, Indianapolis, Indiana

- Date: August 24
- Game time: 8:00 p.m. EST
- Game weather: None (indoor stadium)
- Game attendance: 51,337
- Referee: Dick Hantak (105)
- Recap, Game Book

Game information

First quarter

- IND – Mike Vanderjagt 48-yard field goal, 12:27. Colts 3–0. Drive: 6 plays, 47 yards, 2:33.
- IND – Marvin Harrison 12-yard pass from Peyton Manning (Mike Vanderjagt kick), 7:33. Colts 10–0. Drive: 7 plays, 78 yards, 3:23.
- MIN – Robert Smith 4-yard run (Gary Anderson kick), 3:03. Colts 10–7. Drive: 9 plays, 80 yards, 4:30.

Second quarter

- IND – Mike Vanderjagt 47-yard field goal, 12:33. Colts 13–7. Drive: 10 plays, 58 yards, 5:30.

Third quarter

- MIN – Randy Moss 54-yard pass from Daunte Culpepper (Gary Anderson kick), 13:28. Vikings 14–13. Drive: 3 plays, 80 yards, 1:32.
- IND – Jamel White 1-yard run (Danny Kight kick), 10:19. Colts 20–14. Drive: 6 plays, 80 yards, 3:09.
- MIN – Gary Anderson 23-yard field goal, 4:42. Colts 20–17. Drive: 10 plays, 69 yards, 5:37.

Fourth quarter

- MIN – Troy Walters 62-yard punt return (Gary Anderson kick), 12:36. Vikings 24–20.
- IND – Jamel White 96-yard kickoff return (Danny Kight kick), 12:20. Colts 27–24. Drive: 0 plays, 0 yards, 0:16.
- IND – Penalty on Bubby Brister enforced in the end zone for a safety, 11:13. Colts 29–24.
- MIN – Matthew Hatchette 4-yard pass from Bubby Brister (pass failed), 1:01. Vikings 30–29. Drive: 10 plays, 80 yards, 3:39.
- IND – Danny Kight 43-yard field goal, 0:00. Colts 32–30. Drive: 6 plays, 26 yards, 1:01.

Top passers

- MIN – Daunte Culpepper – 10/14, 171 yards, TD
- IND – Billy Joe Hobert – 6/11, 115 yards

Top rushers

- MIN – Moe Williams – 8 rushes, 35 yards
- IND – Abdul-Karim al-Jabbar – 8 rushes, 48 yards

Top receivers

- MIN – Randy Moss – 3 receptions, 88 yards, TD
- IND – Isaac Jones – 5 receptions, 105 yards

== Regular season ==
=== Schedule ===
| Week | Date | Opponent | Result | Record | Venue | Attendance | NFL.com recap |
|---|---|---|---|---|---|---|---|
| 1 | September 3 | **Chicago Bears** | **W** 30–27 | 1–0 | Hubert H. Humphrey Metrodome | 64,104 | Recap |
| 2 | September 10 | Miami Dolphins | **W** 13–7 | 2–0 | Hubert H. Humphrey Metrodome | 64,112 | Recap |
| 3 | September 17 | at New England Patriots | **W** 21–13 | 3–0 | Foxboro Stadium | 60,292 | Recap |
| 4 | Bye | | | | | | |
| 5 | October 1 | at **Detroit Lions** | **W** 31–24 | 4–0 | Silverdome | 76,438 | Recap |
| 6 | October 9 | **Tampa Bay Buccaneers** | **W** 30–23 | 5–0 | Hubert H. Humphrey Metrodome | 64,162 | Recap |
| 7 | October 15 | at **Chicago Bears** | **W** 28–16 | 6–0 | Soldier Field | 66,944 | Recap |
| 8 | October 22 | Buffalo Bills | **W** 31–27 | 7–0 | Hubert H. Humphrey Metrodome | 64,116 | Recap |
| 9 | October 29 | at **Tampa Bay Buccaneers** | **L** 13–41 | 7–1 | Raymond James Stadium | 65,589 | Recap |
| 10 | November 6 | at **Green Bay Packers** | **L** 20–26 (OT) | 7–2 | Lambeau Field | 59,854 | Recap |
| 11 | November 12 | Arizona Cardinals | **W** 31–14 | 8–2 | Hubert H. Humphrey Metrodome | 64,223 | Recap |
| 12 | November 19 | Carolina Panthers | **W** 31–17 | 9–2 | Hubert H. Humphrey Metrodome | 64,208 | Recap |
| 13 | November 23 | at Dallas Cowboys | **W** 27–15 | 10–2 | Texas Stadium | 63,878 | Recap |
| 14 | November 30 | **Detroit Lions** | **W** 24–17 | 11–2 | Hubert H. Humphrey Metrodome | 64,214 | Recap |
| 15 | December 10 | at St. Louis Rams | **L** 29–40 | 11–3 | TWA Dome | 66,273 | Recap |
| 16 | December 17 | **Green Bay Packers** | **L** 28–33 | 11–4 | Hubert H. Humphrey Metrodome | 64,183 | Recap |
| 17 | December 24 | at Indianapolis Colts | **L** 10–31 | 11–5 | RCA Dome | 56,672 | Recap |

Note: Intra-division opponents are in bold text.

=== Game summaries ===
==== Week 1: vs. Chicago Bears ====
Week 1: Chicago Bears at Minnesota Vikings

| Quarter | 1 | 2 | 3 | 4 | Total |
|---|---|---|---|---|---|
| Bears | 7 | 6 | 7 | 7 | **27** |
| **Vikings** | 6 | 3 | 7 | 14 | **30** |

at Hubert H. Humphrey Metrodome, Minneapolis, Minnesota

- Date: September 3
- Game time: 12:00 p.m. CDT
- Game weather: None (indoor stadium)
- Game attendance: 64,104
- Referee: Ed Hochuli (85)
- Recap, Game Book

Game information

**First quarter**

- MIN – Gary Anderson 35-yard field goal, 10:16. Vikings 3–0. **Drive: 8 plays, 54 yards, 4:44.**
- CHI – John Allred 18-yard pass from Cade McNown (Paul Edinger kick), 3:58. Bears 7–3. **Drive: 11 plays, 78 yards, 6:18.**
- MIN – Gary Anderson 38-yard field goal, 1:16. Bears 7–6. **Drive: 5 plays, 38 yards, 2:42.**

**Second quarter**

- CHI – Paul Edinger 29-yard field goal, 5:19. Bears 10–6. **Drive: 7 plays, 45 yards, 3:38.**
- MIN – Gary Anderson 45-yard field goal, 1:51. Bears 10–9. **Drive: 7 plays, 31 yards, 3:28.**
- CHI – Paul Edinger 49-yard field goal, 0:16. Bears 13–9. **Drive: 12 plays, 36 yards, 1:35.**

**Third quarter**

- CHI – Marcus Robinson 48-yard pass from Cade McNown (Paul Edinger kick), 10:10. Bears 20–9. **Drive: 8 plays, 74 yards, 4:50.**
- MIN – Daunte Culpepper 1-yard run (Gary Anderson kick), 5:24. Bears 20–16. **Drive: 9 plays, 72 yards, 4:46.**

**Fourth quarter**

- MIN – Daunte Culpepper 7-yard run (Gary Anderson kick), 10:59. Vikings 23–20. **Drive: 6 plays, 93 yards, 3:15.**
- MIN – Daunte Culpepper 4-yard run (Gary Anderson kick), 4:35. Vikings 30–20. **Drive: 7 plays, 81 yards, 2:30.**
- CHI – Cade McNown 8-yard run (Paul Edinger kick), 1:17. Vikings 30–27. **Drive: 10 plays, 75 yards, 3:18.**

**Top passers**

- CHI – Cade McNown – 27/41, 290 yards, 2 TD
- MIN – Daunte Culpepper – 13/23, 190 yards, INT

**Top rushers**

- CHI – Cade McNown – 10 rushes, 87 yards, TD
- MIN – Robert Smith – 14 rushes, 109 yards

**Top receivers**

- CHI – Marcus Robinson – 7 receptions, 86 yards, TD
- MIN – Randy Moss – 4 receptions, 89 yards

==== Week 2: vs. Miami Dolphins ====
Week 2: Miami Dolphins at Minnesota Vikings

| Quarter | 1 | 2 | 3 | 4 | Total |
|---|---|---|---|---|---|
| Dolphins | 0 | 0 | 0 | 7 | **7** |
| **Vikings** | 3 | 0 | 0 | 10 | **13** |

at Hubert H. Humphrey Metrodome, Minneapolis, Minnesota

- Date: September 10
- Game time: 12:00 p.m. CDT
- Game weather: None (indoor stadium)
- Game attendance: 64,112
- Referee: Gerry Austin (34)
- Recap, Game Book

Game information

**First quarter**

- MIN – Gary Anderson 28-yard field goal, 2:46. Vikings 3–0. **Drive: 10 plays, 75 yards, 5:53.**

**Second quarter**

- No scoring plays.

**Third quarter**

- No scoring plays.

**Fourth quarter**

- MIN – Gary Anderson 49-yard field goal, 11:30. Vikings 6–0. **Drive: 13 plays, 63 yards, 5:36.**
- MIN – Randy Moss 15-yard pass from Daunte Culpepper (Gary Anderson kick), 1:56. Vikings 13–0. **Drive: 5 plays, 54 yards, 1:55.**
- MIA – Thurman Thomas 2-yard pass from Jay Fiedler (Olindo Mare kick), 1:02. Vikings 13–7. **Drive: 6 plays, 66 yards, 0:54.**

**Top passers**

- MIA – Jay Fiedler – 12/31, 175 yards, TD, INT
- MIN – Daunte Culpepper – 23/37, 355 yards, TD, 3 INT

**Top rushers**

- MIA – Lamar Smith – 11 rushes, 27 yards
- MIN – Robert Smith – 18 rushes, 72 yards

**Top receivers**

- MIA – Tony Martin – 6 receptions, 120 yards
- MIN – Cris Carter – 9 receptions, 168 yards

==== Week 3: at New England Patriots ====
Week 3: Minnesota Vikings at New England Patriots

| Quarter | 1 | 2 | 3 | 4 | Total |
|---|---|---|---|---|---|
| **Vikings** | 7 | 14 | 0 | 0 | **21** |
| Patriots | 7 | 0 | 0 | 6 | **13** |

at Foxboro Stadium, Foxborough, Massachusetts

- Date: September 17
- Game time: 4:15 p.m. EDT
- Game weather: None (indoor stadium)
- Game attendance: 60,292
- Referee: Phil Luckett (59)
- Recap, Game Book

Game information

**First quarter**

- MIN – Robert Smith 4-yard run (Gary Anderson kick), 6:06. Vikings 7–0. **Drive: 17 plays, 73 yards, 8:54.**
- NE – Kevin Faulk 2-yard run (Adam Vinatieri kick), 4:15. Tied 7–7. **Drive: 5 plays, 61 yards, 1:51.**

**Second quarter**

- MIN – Johnny McWilliams 1-yard pass from Daunte Culpepper (Gary Anderson kick), 9:53. Vikings 14–7. **Drive: 16 plays, 80 yards, 9:22.**
- MIN – Matthew Hatchette 39-yard pass from Daunte Culpepper (Gary Anderson kick), 5:18. Vikings 21–7. **Drive: 5 plays, 53 yards, 3:04.**

**Third quarter**

- No scoring plays.

**Fourth quarter**

- NE – Terry Glenn 8-yard pass from Drew Bledsoe (run failed), 11:11. Vikings 21–13. **Drive: 6 plays, 43 yards, 2:14.**

**Top passers**

- MIN – Daunte Culpepper – 19/28, 177 yards, 2 TD, INT
- NE – Drew Bledsoe – 21/35, 190 yards, TD, INT

**Top rushers**

- MIN – Robert Smith – 29 rushes, 91 yards, TD
- NE – Kevin Faulk – 13 rushes, 80 yards, TD

**Top receivers**

- MIN – Cris Carter – 7 receptions, 67 yards
- NE – Terry Glenn – 8 receptions, 69 yards, TD

This marked the Vikings' last win over the Patriots until 2022.

==== Week 5: at Detroit Lions ====
Week 5: Minnesota Vikings at Detroit Lions

| Quarter | 1 | 2 | 3 | 4 | Total |
|---|---|---|---|---|---|
| **Vikings** | 7 | 3 | 7 | 14 | **31** |
| Lions | 7 | 3 | 0 | 14 | **24** |

at Pontiac Silverdome, Detroit, Michigan

- Date: October 1
- Game time: 1:00 p.m. EDT
- Game weather: None (indoor stadium)
- Game attendance: 76,438
- Referee: Bill Carollo (63)
- Recap, Game Book

Game information

**First quarter**

- DET – Germane Crowell 9-yard pass from Charlie Batch (Jason Hanson kick), 11:05. Lions 7–0. **Drive: 6 plays, 37 yards, 2:45.**
- MIN – Randy Moss 61-yard pass from Daunte Culpepper (Gary Anderson kick), 8:46. Tied 7–7. **Drive: 4 plays, 79 yards, 2:19.**

**Second quarter**

- DET – Jason Hanson 21-yard field goal, 4:08. Lions 10–7. **Drive: 7 plays, 37 yards, 2:38.**
- MIN – Gary Anderson 20-yard field goal, 0:03. Tied 10–10. **Drive: 10 plays, 62 yards, 1:57.**

**Third quarter**

- MIN – Randy Moss 17-yard pass from Daunte Culpepper (Gary Anderson kick), 0:14. Vikings 17–10. **Drive: 8 plays, 65 yards, 4:50.**

**Fourth quarter**

- DET – Charlie Batch 5-yard run (Jason Hanson kick), 12:09. Tied 17–17. **Drive: 7 plays, 69 yards, 3:05.**
- MIN – Randy Moss 50-yard pass from Daunte Culpepper (Gary Anderson kick), 8:48. Vikings 24–17. **Drive: 5 plays, 79 yards, 3:21.**
- MIN – Robert Smith 65-yard run (Gary Anderson kick), 6:23. Vikings 31–17. **Drive: 1 play, 65 yards, 0:12.**
- DET – Mario Bates 1-yard run (Jason Hanson kick), 0:03. Vikings 31–24. **Drive: 12 plays, 75 yards, 1:35.**

**Top passers**

- MIN – Daunte Culpepper – 17/29, 269 yards, 3 TD
- DET – Charlie Batch – 25/44, 239 yards, TD, INT

**Top rushers**

- MIN – Robert Smith – 16 rushes, 134 yards, TD
- DET – James Stewart – 20 rushes, 123 yards

**Top receivers**

- MIN – Randy Moss – 7 receptions, 168 yards, 3 TD
- DET – Germane Crowell – 8 receptions, 85 yards, TD

==== Week 6: vs. Tampa Bay Buccaneers ====
Week 6: Tampa Bay Buccaneers at Minnesota Vikings

| Quarter | 1 | 2 | 3 | 4 | Total |
|---|---|---|---|---|---|
| Buccaneers | 7 | 3 | 6 | 7 | **23** |
| **Vikings** | 7 | 10 | 3 | 10 | **30** |

at Hubert H. Humphrey Metrodome, Minneapolis, Minnesota

- Date: October 9
- Game time: 8:10 p.m. CDT
- Game weather: None (indoor stadium)
- Game attendance: 64,162
- Referee: Tony Corrente (99)
- Recap, Game Book

Game information

**First quarter**

- MIN – Daunte Culpepper 27-yard run (Gary Anderson kick), 14:36. Vikings 7–0. **Drive: 1 play, 27 yards, 0:09.**
- TB – Shaun King 11-yard run (Martín Gramática kick), 4:01. Tied 7–7. **Drive: 9 plays, 74 yards, 4:28.**

**Second quarter**

- MIN – Gary Anderson 37-yard field goal, 12:14. Vikings 10–7. **Drive: 10 plays, 58 yards, 6:47.**
- MIN – John Davis 26-yard pass from Daunte Culpepper (Gary Anderson kick), 11:11. Vikings 17–7. **Drive: 3 plays, 27 yards, 0:52.**
- TB – Martín Gramática 23-yard field goal, 1:06. Vikings 17–10. **Drive: 19 plays, 71 yards, 10:05.**

**Third quarter**

- MIN – Gary Anderson 42-yard field goal, 11:12. Vikings 20–10. **Drive: 7 plays, 47 yards, 3:48.**
- TB – Martín Gramática 33-yard field goal, 8:11. Vikings 20–13. **Drive: 7 plays, 55 yards, 3:01.**
- TB – Martín Gramática 35-yard field goal, 0:44. Vikings 20–16. **Drive: 9 plays, 44 yards, 5:17.**

**Fourth quarter**

- TB – Donnie Abraham 53-yard return of blocked field goal (Martín Gramática kick), 12:13. Buccaneers 23–20.
- MIN – Randy Moss 42-yard pass from Daunte Culpepper (Gary Anderson kick), 8:42. Vikings 27–23. **Drive: 6 plays, 73 yards, 3:31.**
- MIN – Gary Anderson 19-yard field goal, 0:59. Vikings 30–23. **Drive: 10 plays, 51 yards, 4:06.**

**Top passers**

- TB – Shaun King – 26/40, 295 yards
- MIN – Daunte Culpepper – 15/19, 231 yards, 2 TD, INT

**Top rushers**

- TB – Warrick Dunn – 10 rushes, 32 yards
- MIN – Robert Smith – 22 rushes, 81 yards

**Top receivers**

- TB – Jacquez Green – 11 receptions, 131 yards
- MIN – Randy Moss – 5 receptions, 118 yards, TD

==== Week 7: at Chicago Bears ====
Week 7: Minnesota Vikings at Chicago Bears

| Quarter | 1 | 2 | 3 | 4 | Total |
|---|---|---|---|---|---|
| **Vikings** | 0 | 14 | 7 | 7 | **28** |
| Bears | 6 | 3 | 0 | 7 | **16** |

at Soldier Field, Chicago, Illinois

- Date: October 15
- Game time: 7:35 p.m. CDT
- Game weather: None (indoor stadium)
- Game attendance: 66,944
- Referee: Larry Nemmers (20)
- Recap, Game Book

Game information

**First quarter**

- CHI – Dez White 25-yard pass from Cade McNown (run failed), 3:46. Bears 6–0. **Drive: 5 plays, 63 yards, 3:13.**

**Second quarter**

- CHI – Paul Edinger 22-yard field goal, 8:58. Bears 9–0. **Drive: 10 plays, 76 yards, 4:46.**
- MIN – Robert Smith 72-yard run (Gary Anderson kick), 8:35. Bears 9–7. **Drive: 1 play, 72 yards, 0:23.**
- MIN – Cris Carter 24-yard pass from Daunte Culpepper (Gary Anderson kick), 5:26. Vikings 14–9. **Drive: 4 plays, 33 yards, 1:55.**

**Third quarter**

- MIN – Matthew Hatchette 24-yard pass from Daunte Culpepper (Gary Anderson kick), 10:01. Vikings 21–9. **Drive: 5 plays, 54 yards, 1:59.**

**Fourth quarter**

- CHI – James Allen 6-yard run (Paul Edinger kick), 14:56. Vikings 21–16. **Drive: 9 plays, 74 yards, 4:15.**
- MIN – Randy Moss 7-yard pass from Daunte Culpepper (Gary Anderson kick), 9:26. Vikings 28–16. **Drive: 9 plays, 59 yards, 5:30.**

**Top passers**

- MIN – Daunte Culpepper – 15/26, 198 yards, 3 TD
- CHI – Cade McNown – 19/33, 210 yards, TD

**Top rushers**

- MIN – Robert Smith – 23 rushes, 170 yards, TD
- CHI – James Allen – 22 rushes, 71 yards, TD

**Top receivers**

- MIN – Cris Carter – 7 receptions, 111 yards, TD
- CHI – Marcus Robinson – 7 receptions, 88 yards

==== Week 8: vs. Buffalo Bills ====
Week 8: Buffalo Bills at Minnesota Vikings

| Quarter | 1 | 2 | 3 | 4 | Total |
|---|---|---|---|---|---|
| Bills | 0 | 10 | 7 | 10 | **27** |
| **Vikings** | 3 | 3 | 7 | 18 | **31** |

at Hubert H. Humphrey Metrodome, Minneapolis, Minnesota

- Date: October 22
- Game time: 12:00 p.m. CDT
- Game weather: None (indoor stadium)
- Game attendance: 64,116
- Referee: Ron Blum (7)
- Recap, Game Book

Game information

**First quarter**

- MIN – Gary Anderson 38-yard field goal, 2:27. Vikings 3–0. **Drive: 8 plays, 51 yards, 5:10.**

**Second quarter**

- BUF – Eric Moulds 25-yard pass from Doug Flutie (Steve Christie kick), 13:38. Bills 7–3. **Drive: 5 plays, 53 yards, 1:41.**
- BUF – Steve Christie 25-yard field goal, 0:54. Bills 10–3. **Drive: 21 plays, 80 yards, 10:55.**
- MIN – Gary Anderson 20-yard field goal, 0:00. Bills 10–6. **Drive: 6 plays, 64 yards, 0:54.**

**Third quarter**

- MIN – Cris Carter 6-yard pass from Daunte Culpepper (Gary Anderson kick), 9:17. Vikings 13–10. **Drive: 10 plays, 69 yards, 5:43.**
- BUF – Sammy Morris 1-yard run (Steve Christie kick), 1:13. Bills 17–13. **Drive: 13 plays, 80 yards, 8:04.**

**Fourth quarter**

- BUF – Sammy Morris 18-yard pass from Doug Flutie (Steve Christie kick), 14:19. Bills 24–13. **Drive: 4 plays, 34 yards, 0:54.**
- MIN – Cris Carter 11-yard pass from Daunte Culpepper (Daunte Culpepper–Moe Williams pass), 9:34. Bills 24–21. **Drive: 7 plays, 69 yards, 4:45.**
- BUF – Steve Christie 48-yard field goal, 6:39. Bills 27–21. **Drive: 6 plays, 18 yards, 2:55.**
- MIN – Randy Moss 39-yard pass from Daunte Culpepper (Gary Anderson kick), 3:42. Vikings 28–27. **Drive: 2 plays, 34 yards, 0:12.**
- MIN – Gary Anderson 21-yard field goal, 1:04. Vikings 31–27. **Drive: 7 plays, 31 yards, 1:42.**

**Top passers**

- BUF – Doug Flutie – 28/43, 294 yards, 2 TD
- MIN – Daunte Culpepper – 17/29, 251 yards, 3 TD, INT

**Top rushers**

- BUF – Shawn Bryson – 11 rushes, 72 yards
- MIN – Robert Smith – 16 rushes, 68 yards

**Top receivers**

- BUF – Eric Moulds – 12 receptions, 135 yards, TD
- MIN – Randy Moss – 5 receptions, 110 yards, TD

==== Week 9: at Tampa Bay Buccaneers ====
Week 9: Minnesota Vikings at Tampa Bay Buccaneers

| Quarter | 1 | 2 | 3 | 4 | Total |
|---|---|---|---|---|---|
| Vikings | 3 | 10 | 0 | 0 | **13** |
| **Buccaneers** | 14 | 17 | 3 | 7 | **41** |

at Raymond James Stadium, Tampa, Florida

- Date: October 29
- Game time: 1:00 p.m. EST
- Game weather: Hazy, 80 °F (27 °C)
- Game attendance: 65,589
- Referee: Phil Luckett (59)
- Recap, Game Book

Game information

**First quarter**

- TB – Keyshawn Johnson 9-yard pass from Shaun King (Martín Gramática kick), 10:33. Buccaneers 7–0. **Drive: 2 plays, 14 yards, 0:47.**
- MIN – Gary Anderson 30-yard field goal, 6:35. Buccaneers 7–3. **Drive: 8 plays, 71 yards, 3:58.**
- TB – Warrick Dunn 23-yard pass from Shaun King (Martín Gramática kick), 3:40. Buccaneers 14–3. **Drive: 6 plays, 64 yards, 2:55.**

**Second quarter**

- MIN – Randy Moss 7-yard pass from Daunte Culpepper (Gary Anderson kick), 11:57. Buccaneers 14–10. **Drive: 13 plays, 82 yards, 6:43.**
- TB – Dave Moore 20-yard pass from Shaun King (Martín Gramática kick), 9:46. Buccaneers 21–10. **Drive: 4 plays, 80 yards, 2:11.**
- TB – Derrick Brooks 34-yard interception return (Martín Gramática kick), 7:58. Buccaneers 28–10.
- TB – Martín Gramática 47-yard field goal, 3:38. Buccaneers 31–10. **Drive: 5 plays, 29 yards, 1:54.**
- MIN – Gary Anderson 37-yard field goal, 0:20. Buccaneers 31–13. **Drive: 15 plays, 56 yards, 3:18.**

**Third quarter**

- TB – Martín Gramática 26-yard field goal, 6:25. Buccaneers 34–13. **Drive: 14 plays, 82 yards, 8:35.**

**Fourth quarter**

- TB – Reidel Anthony 16-yard pass from Shaun King (Martín Gramática kick), 5:05. Buccaneers 41–13. **Drive: 7 plays, 75 yards, 4:34.**

**Top passers**

- MIN – Daunte Culpepper – 29/53, 313 yards, TD, 2 INT
- TB – Shaun King – 16/23, 267 yards, 4 TD

**Top rushers**

- MIN – Robert Smith – 12 rushes, 61 yards
- TB – Warrick Dunn – 11 rushes, 89 yards

**Top receivers**

- MIN – Cris Carter – 7 receptions, 115 yards
- TB – Keyshawn Johnson – 6 receptions, 121 yards, TD

==== Week 10: at Green Bay Packers ====
Week 10: Minnesota Vikings at Green Bay Packers

| Quarter | 1 | 2 | 3 | 4 | OT | Total |
|---|---|---|---|---|---|---|
| Vikings | 3 | 10 | 7 | 0 | 0 | **20** |
| **Packers** | 0 | 10 | 10 | 0 | 6 | **26** |

at Lambeau Field, Green Bay, Wisconsin

- Date: November 6
- Game time: 8:00 p.m. CST
- Game weather: Occasional rain, blustery, 50 °F (10 °C)
- Game attendance: 59,854
- Referee: Dick Hantak (105)
- TV announcers (ABC): Al Michaels, Dan Fouts, Dennis Miller, Melissa Stark and Eric Dickerson
- Recap, Game Book

Game information

**First quarter**

- MIN – Gary Anderson 30-yard field goal, 8:25. Vikings 3–0. **Drive: 10 plays, 53 yards, 5:36.**

**Second quarter**

- GB – Ryan Longwell 24-yard field goal, 14:53. Tied 3–3. **Drive: 15 plays, 81 yards, 8:32.**
- MIN – Cris Carter 12-yard pass from Daunte Culpepper (Gary Anderson kick), 10:03. Vikings 10–3. **Drive: 8 plays, 84 yards, 4:50.**
- GB – Ahman Green 5-yard pass from Brett Favre (Ryan Longwell kick), 6:51. Tied 10–10. **Drive: 6 plays, 87 yards, 3:12.**
- MIN – Gary Anderson 48-yard field goal, 0:00. Vikings 13–10. **Drive: 9 plays, 57 yards, 1:11.**

**Third quarter**

- GB – Ryan Longwell 31-yard field goal, 8:48. Tied 13–13. **Drive: 6 plays, 21 yards, 2:22.**
- MIN – Robert Smith 45-yard pass from Daunte Culpepper (Gary Anderson kick), 4:00. Vikings 20–13. **Drive: 8 plays, 73 yards, 4:48.**
- GB – Ahman Green 2-yard run (Ryan Longwell kick), 3:32. Tied 20–20. **Drive: 2 plays, 2 yards, 0:28.**

**Fourth quarter**

- No scoring plays.

**Overtime**

- GB – Antonio Freeman 43-yard pass from Brett Favre, 11:21. Packers 26–20. **Drive: 7 plays, 82 yards, 3:39.**

**Top passers**

- MIN – Daunte Culpepper – 17/34, 276 yards, 2 TD, 3 INT
- GB – Brett Favre – 17/36, 235 yards, 2 TD

**Top rushers**

- MIN – Robert Smith – 24 rushes, 122 yards
- GB – Ahman Green – 23 rushes, 68 yards, TD

**Top receivers**

- MIN – Randy Moss – 6 receptions, 130 yards
- GB – Antonio Freeman – 5 receptions, 118 yards, TD

==== Week 11: vs. Arizona Cardinals ====
Week 11: Arizona Cardinals at Minnesota Vikings

| Quarter | 1 | 2 | 3 | 4 | Total |
|---|---|---|---|---|---|
| Cardinals | 7 | 0 | 0 | 7 | **14** |
| **Vikings** | 7 | 3 | 7 | 14 | **31** |

at Hubert H. Humphrey Metrodome, Minneapolis, Minnesota

- Date: November 12
- Game time: 12:00 p.m. CST
- Game weather: None (indoor stadium)
- Game attendance: 64,223
- Referee: Bob McElwee (95)
- Recap, Game Book

Game information

**First quarter**

- MIN – Robert Smith 33-yard pass from Daunte Culpepper (Gary Anderson kick), 6:42. Vikings 7–0. **Drive: 9 plays, 86 yards, 5:17.**
- ARI – Michael Pittman Sr. 1-yard run (Cary Blanchard kick), 0:13. Tied 7–7. **Drive: 11 plays, 75 yards, 6:29.**

**Second quarter**

- MIN – Gary Anderson 33-yard field goal, 0:00. Vikings 10–7. **Drive: 12 plays, 64 yards, 2:19.**

**Third quarter**

- MIN – Randy Moss 4-yard pass from Daunte Culpepper (Gary Anderson kick), 10:15. Vikings 17–7. **Drive: 8 plays, 69 yards, 4:45.**

**Fourth quarter**

- MIN – Daunte Culpepper 3-yard run (Gary Anderson kick), 10:11. Vikings 24–7. **Drive: 7 plays, 55 yards, 4:22.**
- MIN – Cris Carter 12-yard pass from Daunte Culpepper (Gary Anderson kick), 3:45. Vikings 31–7. **Drive: 8 plays, 76 yards, 4:19.**
- ARI – MarTay Jenkins 98-yard kickoff return (Cary Blanchard kick), 3:30. Vikings 31–14. **Drive: 0 plays, 0 yards, 0:15.**

**Top passers**

- ARI – Jake Plummer – 19/28, 219 yards
- MIN – Daunte Culpepper – 25/32, 302 yards, 3 TD, INT

**Top rushers**

- ARI – Michael Pittman Sr. – 12 rushes, 50 yards, TD
- MIN – Robert Smith – 20 rushes, 117 yards

**Top receivers**

- ARI – Frank Sanders – 5 receptions, 82 yards
- MIN – Cris Carter – 11 receptions, 119 yards, TD

==== Week 12: vs. Carolina Panthers ====
Week 12: Carolina Panthers at Minnesota Vikings

| Quarter | 1 | 2 | 3 | 4 | Total |
|---|---|---|---|---|---|
| Panthers | 7 | 7 | 0 | 3 | **17** |
| **Vikings** | 14 | 10 | 7 | 0 | **31** |

at Hubert H. Humphrey Metrodome, Minneapolis, Minnesota

- Date: November 19
- Game time: 12:00 p.m. CST
- Game weather: None (indoor stadium)
- Game attendance: 64,208
- Referee: Walt Coleman (65)
- Recap, Game Book

Game information

**First quarter**

- CAR – Steve Beuerlein 1-yard run (Joe Nedney kick), 8:09. Panthers 7–0. **Drive: 12 plays, 72 yards, 6:51.**
- MIN – Randy Moss 36-yard pass from Daunte Culpepper (Gary Anderson kick), 5:41. Tied 7–7. **Drive: 6 plays, 60 yards, 2:28.**
- MIN – Robert Smith 53-yard pass from Daunte Culpepper (Gary Anderson kick), 0:29. Vikings 14–7. **Drive: 2 plays, 62 yards, 0:50.**

**Second quarter**

- MIN – Robert Smith 3-yard run (Gary Anderson kick), 10:35. Vikings 21–7. **Drive: 7 plays, 58 yards, 3:28.**
- CAR – Chris Hetherington 1-yard run (Joe Nedney kick), 0:20. Vikings 21–14. **Drive: 5 plays, 30 yards, 0:47.**
- MIN – Gary Anderson 43-yard field goal, 0:00. Vikings 24–14. **Drive: 3 plays, 32 yards, 0:20.**

**Third quarter**

- MIN – Cris Carter 15-yard pass from Daunte Culpepper (Gary Anderson kick), 2:02. Vikings 31–14. **Drive: 11 plays, 81 yards, 6:05.**

**Fourth quarter**

- CAR – Joe Nedney 28-yard field goal, 4:27. Vikings 31–17. **Drive: 12 plays, 69 yards, 6:23.**

**Top passers**

- CAR – Steve Beuerlein – 26/44, 272 yards, 2 INT
- MIN – Daunte Culpepper – 22/29, 357 yards, 3 TD

**Top rushers**

- CAR – Brad Hoover – 18 rushes, 59 yards
- MIN – Robert Smith – 23 rushes, 103 yards, TD

**Top receivers**

- CAR – Muhsin Muhammad – 6 receptions, 76 yards
- MIN – Cris Carter – 8 receptions, 138 yards, TD

==== Week 13: at Dallas Cowboys ====
Week 13: Minnesota Vikings at Dallas Cowboys

| Quarter | 1 | 2 | 3 | 4 | Total |
|---|---|---|---|---|---|
| **Vikings** | 0 | 10 | 17 | 0 | **27** |
| Cowboys | 3 | 6 | 0 | 6 | **15** |

at Texas Stadium, Irving, Texas

- Date: November 23
- Game time: 3:15 p.m. CST
- Game weather: Cloudy, 55 °F (13 °C)
- Game attendance: 63,878
- Referee: Tony Corrente (99)
- TV announcers (Fox): Pat Summerall and John Madden
- Recap, Game Book

Game information

**First quarter**

- DAL – Tim Seder 37-yard field goal, 10:01. Cowboys 3–0. **Drive: 9 plays, 52 yards, 4:59.**

**Second quarter**

- DAL – Tim Seder 43-yard field goal, 12:27. Cowboys 6–0. **Drive: 8 plays, 32 yards, 4:41.**
- MIN – Gary Anderson 49-yard field goal, 8:10. Cowboys 6–3. **Drive: 8 plays, 26 yards, 4:17.**
- MIN – Robert Smith 15-yard run (Gary Anderson kick), 1:52. Vikings 10–6. **Drive: 6 plays, 88 yards, 2:29.**
- DAL – Tim Seder 36-yard field goal, 0:00. Vikings 10–9. **Drive: 7 plays, 39 yards, 1:52.**

**Third quarter**

- MIN – Randy Moss 7-yard pass from Daunte Culpepper (Gary Anderson kick), 12:25. Vikings 17–9. **Drive: 6 plays, 62 yards, 2:35.**
- MIN – Gary Anderson 29-yard field goal, 6:11. Vikings 20–9. **Drive: 8 plays, 41 yards, 3:52.**
- MIN – Randy Moss 36-yard pass from Daunte Culpepper (Gary Anderson kick), 0:18. Vikings 27–9. **Drive: 6 plays, 70 yards, 3:32.**

**Fourth quarter**

- DAL – David LaFleur 6-yard pass from Troy Aikman (run failed), 2:32. Vikings 27–15. **Drive: 11 plays, 80 yards, 3:37.**

**Top passers**

- MIN – Daunte Culpepper – 15/22, 205 yards, 2 TD
- DAL – Troy Aikman – 30/43, 276 yards, TD, INT

**Top rushers**

- MIN – Robert Smith – 21 rushes, 148 yards, TD
- DAL – Emmitt Smith – 12 rushes, 100 yards

**Top receivers**

- MIN – Randy Moss – 7 receptions, 144 yards, 2 TD
- DAL – Jason Tucker – 6 receptions, 57 yards

==== Week 14: vs. Detroit Lions ====
Week 14: Detroit Lions at Minnesota Vikings

| Quarter | 1 | 2 | 3 | 4 | Total |
|---|---|---|---|---|---|
| Lions | 0 | 3 | 0 | 14 | **17** |
| **Vikings** | 7 | 10 | 0 | 7 | **24** |

at Hubert H. Humphrey Metrodome, Minneapolis, Minnesota

- Date: November 30
- Game time: 7:35 p.m. CST
- Game weather: None (indoor stadium)
- Game attendance: 64,214
- Referee: Larry Nemmers (20)
- TV announcers (ESPN): Mike Patrick, Joe Theismann and Paul Maguire
- Recap, Game Book

Game information

**First quarter**

- MIN – Robert Smith 1-yard run (Gary Anderson kick), 7:39. Vikings 7–0. **Drive: 8 plays, 34 yards, 4:05.**

**Second quarter**

- MIN – Cris Carter 4-yard pass from Daunte Culpepper (Gary Anderson kick), 14:56. Vikings 14–0. **Drive: 12 plays, 71 yards, 5:29.**
- DET – Jason Hanson 52-yard field goal, 1:12. Vikings 14–3. **Drive: 7 plays, 41 yards, 3:05.**
- MIN – Gary Anderson 40-yard field goal, 0:04. Vikings 17–3. **Drive: 8 plays, 58 yards, 1:08.**

**Third quarter**

- No scoring plays.

**Fourth quarter**

- DET – James Stewart 3-yard run (Jason Hanson kick), 13:59. Vikings 17–10. **Drive: 2 plays, 9 yards, 0:52.**
- MIN – Robert Smith 43-yard run (Gary Anderson kick), 3:04. Vikings 24–10. **Drive: 1 play, 43 yards, 0:11.**
- DET – Larry Foster 40-yard pass from Stoney Case (Jason Hanson kick), 0:13. Vikings 24–17. **Drive: 10 plays, 80 yards, 2:51.**

**Top passers**

- DET – Stoney Case – 23/33, 230 yards, TD, INT
- MIN – Daunte Culpepper – 19/32, 160 yards, TD, 2 INT

**Top rushers**

- DET – James Stewart – 15 rushes, 67 yards, TD
- MIN – Robert Smith – 17 rushes, 115 yards, 2 TD

**Top receivers**

- DET – Larry Foster – 8 receptions, 106 yards, TD
- MIN – Cris Carter – 7 receptions, 45 yards, TD

==== Week 15: at St. Louis Rams ====
Week 15: Minnesota Vikings at St. Louis Rams

| Quarter | 1 | 2 | 3 | 4 | Total |
|---|---|---|---|---|---|
| Vikings | 0 | 7 | 14 | 8 | **29** |
| **Rams** | 14 | 6 | 13 | 7 | **40** |

at Hubert H. Humphrey Metrodome, Minneapolis, Minnesota

- Date: December 10
- Game time: 3:15 p.m. CST
- Game weather: None (indoor stadium)
- Game attendance: 66,273
- Referee: Ron Winter (14)
- Recap, Game Book

Game information

**First quarter**

- STL – Marshall Faulk 1-yard run (Jeff Wilkins kick), 8:56. Rams 7–0. **Drive: 10 plays, 80 yards, 6:04.**
- STL – Marshall Faulk 1-yard run (Jeff Wilkins kick), 4:54. Rams 14–0. **Drive: 4 plays, 39 yards, 2:03.**

**Second quarter**

- STL – Jeff Wilkins 26-yard field goal, 13:48. Rams 17–0. **Drive: 8 plays, 68 yards, 2:52.**
- MIN – Johnny McWilliams 22-yard pass from Daunte Culpepper (Gary Anderson kick), 7:14. Rams 17–7. **Drive: 10 plays, 80 yards, 6:34.**
- STL – Jeff Wilkins 19-yard field goal, 1:11. Rams 20–7. **Drive: 13 plays, 78 yards, 6:03.**

**Third quarter**

- MIN – Daunte Culpepper 8-yard run (Gary Anderson kick), 11:20. Rams 20–14. **Drive: 8 plays, 62 yards, 3:40.**
- STL – Marshall Faulk 5-yard run (pass failed), 8:19. Rams 26–14. **Drive: 6 plays, 79 yards, 3:01.**
- STL – Marshall Faulk 1-yard run (Jeff Wilkins kick), 4:36. Rams 33–14. **Drive: 6 plays, 73 yards, 2:05.**
- MIN – Cris Carter 2-yard pass from Daunte Culpepper (Gary Anderson kick), 0:32. Rams 33–21. **Drive: 8 plays, 60 yards, 4:04.**

**Fourth quarter**

- STL – Justin Watson 6-yard run (Jeff Wilkins kick), 8:10. Rams 40–21. **Drive: 12 plays, 80 yards, 7:22.**
- MIN – Randy Moss 32-yard pass from Daunte Culpepper (Daunte Culpepper–Randy Moss pass), 2:27. Rams 40–29. **Drive: 8 plays, 86 yards, 1:50.**

**Top passers**

- MIN – Daunte Culpepper – 21/33, 221 yards, 3 TD
- STL – Kurt Warner – 27/32, 346 yards

**Top rushers**

- MIN – Robert Smith – 15 rushes, 67 yards
- STL – Marshall Faulk – 25 rushes, 135 yards, 4 TD

**Top receivers**

- MIN – Cris Carter – 7 receptions, 66 yards, TD
- STL – Torry Holt – 9 receptions, 172 yards

==== Week 16: vs. Green Bay Packers ====
Week 16: Green Bay Packers at Minnesota Vikings

| Quarter | 1 | 2 | 3 | 4 | Total |
|---|---|---|---|---|---|
| **Packers** | 10 | 10 | 3 | 10 | **33** |
| Vikings | 7 | 7 | 7 | 7 | **28** |

at Hubert H. Humphrey Metrodome, Minneapolis, Minnesota

- Date: December 17
- Game time: 12:00 p.m. CST
- Game weather: None (indoor stadium)
- Game attendance: 64,183
- Referee: Gerry Austin (34)
- Recap, Game Book

Game information

**First quarter**

- GB – Ryan Longwell 34-yard field goal, 7:38. Packers 3–0. **Drive: 13 plays, 62 yards, 7:22.**
- GB – Antonio Freeman 18-yard pass from Brett Favre (Ryan Longwell kick), 2:04. Packers 10–0. **Drive: 8 plays, 87 yards, 4:04.**
- MIN – Randy Moss 78-yard pass from Daunte Culpepper (Gary Anderson kick), 1:36. Packers 10–7. **Drive: 1 play, 78 yards, 0:28.**

**Second quarter**

- GB – Ahman Green 6-yard pass from Brett Favre (Ryan Longwell kick), 11:51. Packers 17–7. **Drive: 9 plays, 80 yards, 4:45.**
- GB – Ryan Longwell 35-yard field goal, 2:41. Packers 20–7. **Drive: 10 plays, 53 yards, 3:07.**
- MIN – Daunte Culpepper 3-yard run (Gary Anderson kick), 0:20. Packers 20–14. **Drive: 10 plays, 79 yards, 2:21.**

**Third quarter**

- GB – Ryan Longwell 43-yard field goal, 8:39. Packers 23–14. **Drive: 9 plays, 38 yards, 4:07.**
- MIN – Johnny McWilliams 22-yard pass from Daunte Culpepper (Gary Anderson kick), 3:58. Packers 23–21. **Drive: 7 plays, 60 yards, 4:41.**

**Fourth quarter**

- GB – Bill Schroeder 3-yard pass from Brett Favre (Ryan Longwell kick), 14:56. Packers 30–21. **Drive: 9 plays, 64 yards, 4:02.**
- GB – Ryan Longwell 36-yard field goal, 6:51. Packers 33–21. **Drive: 7 plays, 7 yards, 3:52.**
- MIN – Cris Carter 5-yard pass from Daunte Culpepper (Gary Anderson kick), 2:38. Packers 33–28. **Drive: 15 plays, 84 yards, 4:13.**

**Top passers**

- GB – Brett Favre – 26/38, 290 yards, 3 TD
- MIN – Daunte Culpepper – 23/38, 335 yards, 3 TD, INT

**Top rushers**

- GB – Ahman Green – 25 rushes, 161 yards
- MIN – Daunte Culpepper – 7 rushes, 42 yards, TD

**Top receivers**

- GB – Antonio Freeman – 6 receptions, 97 yards, TD
- MIN – Randy Moss – 4 receptions, 136 yards, TD

==== Week 17: at Indianapolis Colts ====
Week 17: Minnesota Vikings at Indianapolis Colts

| Quarter | 1 | 2 | 3 | 4 | Total |
|---|---|---|---|---|---|
| Vikings | 7 | 3 | 0 | 0 | **10** |
| **Colts** | 7 | 14 | 7 | 3 | **31** |

at Hubert H. Humphrey Metrodome, Minneapolis, Minnesota

- Date: December 24
- Game time: 4:15 p.m. EST
- Game weather: None (indoor stadium)
- Game attendance: 56,672
- Referee: Bill Carollo (63)
- Recap, Game Book

Game information

**First quarter**

- IND – Marvin Harrison 4-yard pass from Peyton Manning (Mike Vanderjagt kick), 7:32. Colts 7–0. **Drive: 13 plays, 75 yards, 5:45.**
- MIN – Randy Moss 42-yard pass from Daunte Culpepper (Gary Anderson kick), 3:07. Tied 7–7. **Drive: 8 plays, 81 yards, 4:25.**

**Second quarter**

- IND – Edgerrin James 52-yard pass from Peyton Manning (Mike Vanderjagt kick), 9:12. Colts 14–7. **Drive: 6 plays, 87 yards, 2:43.**
- MIN – Gary Anderson 31-yard field goal, 5:04. Colts 14–10. **Drive: 4 plays, 5 yards, 1:22.**
- IND – Marvin Harrison 15-yard pass from Peyton Manning (Mike Vanderjagt kick), 1:19. Colts 21–10. **Drive: 9 plays, 76 yards, 3:45.**

**Third quarter**

- IND – Marvin Harrison 18-yard pass from Peyton Manning (Mike Vanderjagt kick), 7:47. Colts 28–10. **Drive: 5 plays, 55 yards, 2:25.**

**Fourth quarter**

- IND – Mike Vanderjagt 28-yard field goal, 9:54. Colts 31–10. **Drive: 13 plays, 85 yards, 6:33.**

**Top passers**

- MIN – Daunte Culpepper – 7/10, 97 yards, TD
- IND – Peyton Manning – 25/36, 283 yards, 4 TD, INT

**Top rushers**

- MIN – Robert Smith – 15 rushes, 37 yards
- IND – Edgerrin James – 26 rushes, 128 yards

**Top receivers**

- MIN – Cris Carter – 4 receptions, 67 yards
- IND – Marvin Harrison – 12 receptions, 109 yards, 3 TD

This was the first occasion the Colts hosted the Vikings in the regular season since 1968 in Baltimore, although the two teams would again play in the Colts’ stadium during that postseason. The intervening gap of 31 seasons constitutes the second-longest gap without one team visiting another in NFL history, and at the time was a record. (Note: Tampa Bay did not play at Buffalo until 2009, although the Buccaneers joined the league 33 seasons previously.)

=== Standings ===
NFC Central
| | W | L | T | PCT | PF | PA | STK |
|---|---|---|---|---|---|---|---|
| ^{(2)} Minnesota Vikings | 11 | 5 | 0 | .688 | 397 | 371 | L3 |
| ^{(5)} Tampa Bay Buccaneers | 10 | 6 | 0 | .625 | 388 | 269 | L1 |
| Green Bay Packers | 9 | 7 | 0 | .563 | 353 | 323 | W4 |
| Detroit Lions | 9 | 7 | 0 | .563 | 307 | 307 | L1 |
| Chicago Bears | 5 | 11 | 0 | .313 | 216 | 355 | W1 |

== Postseason ==
=== Schedule ===
| Week | Date | Opponent | Result | Venue | Attendance | NFL.com recap |
|---|---|---|---|---|---|---|
| Division | January 6 | New Orleans Saints | W 34–16 | Hubert H. Humphrey Metrodome | 63,881 | Recap |
| Championship | January 14 | at New York Giants | L 0–41 | Giants Stadium | 79,310 | Recap |

=== Game summaries ===
==== NFC Divisional Playoffs: vs (#3) New Orleans Saints ====
NFC Divisional Playoffs: (#3) New Orleans Saints at (#2) Minnesota Vikings – Game summary

| Quarter | 1 | 2 | 3 | 4 | Total |
|---|---|---|---|---|---|
| Saints | 3 | 0 | 7 | 6 | 16 |
| Vikings | 10 | 7 | 10 | 7 | 34 |

at Hubert H. Humphrey Metrodome, Minneapolis, Minnesota

- Date: January 6
- Game time: 11:30 a.m. CST/12:30 p.m. EST
- Game weather: None (indoor stadium)
- Game attendance: 63,881
- Referee: Walt Coleman (65)
- TV announcers (Fox): Dick Stockton, Matt Millen and Pam Oliver
- Recap, Game Book

Game information

First quarter

- MIN – Randy Moss 53-yard pass from Daunte Culpepper (Gary Anderson kick), 11:57. Vikings 7–0. Drive: 3 plays, 64 yards, 1:20.
- NO – Doug Brien 33-yard field goal, 7:46. Vikings 7–3. Drive: 10 plays, 65 yards, 4:11.
- MIN – Gary Anderson 24-yard field goal, 1:36. Vikings 10–3. Drive: 12 plays, 67 yards, 6:10.

Second quarter

- MIN – Cris Carter 17-yard pass from Daunte Culpepper (Gary Anderson kick), 1:29. Vikings 17–3. Drive: 7 plays, 73 yards, 3:40.

Third quarter

- MIN – Randy Moss 68-yard pass from Daunte Culpepper (Gary Anderson kick), 13:33. Vikings 24–3. Drive: 3 plays, 77 yards, 1:27.
- NO – Dave Stachelski 2-yard pass from Aaron Brooks (Doug Brien kick), 9:33. Vikings 24–10. Drive: 8 plays, 83 yards, 4:00.
- MIN – Gary Anderson 44-yard field goal, 4:31. Vikings 27–10. Drive: 10 plays, 50 yards, 5:02.

Fourth quarter

- MIN – Robert Smith 2-yard run (Gary Anderson kick), 10:46. Vikings 34–10. Drive: 8 plays, 29 yards, 4:32.
- NO – Willie Jackson 48-yard pass from Aaron Brooks (pass failed), 2:19. Vikings 34–16. Drive: 3 plays, 66 yards, 0:58.

Top passers

- NO – Aaron Brooks – 30/48, 295 yards, 2 TD, 2 INT
- MIN – Daunte Culpepper – 17/31, 302 yards, 3 TD

Top rushers

- NO – Aaron Brooks – 5 rushes, 29 yards
- MIN – Robert Smith – 25 rushes, 74 yards, TD

Top receivers

- NO – Willie Jackson – 9 receptions, 125 yards, TD
- MIN – Randy Moss – 2 receptions, 121 yards, 2 TD

==== NFC Championship Game: vs (#1) New York Giants ====
NFC Championship Game: (#2) Minnesota Vikings at (#1) New York Giants – Game summary

| Quarter | 1 | 2 | 3 | 4 | Total |
|---|---|---|---|---|---|
| Vikings | 0 | 0 | 0 | 0 | 0 |
| Giants | 14 | 20 | 7 | 0 | 41 |

at Giants Stadium, East Rutherford, New Jersey

- Date: January 14
- Game time: 12:30 p.m. EST/11:30 a.m. CST
- Game weather: Mostly cloudy, 35 °F (2 °C)
- Game attendance: 79,310
- Referee: Tony Corrente (99)
- TV announcers (Fox): Pat Summerall, John Madden, D.J. Johnson and Pam Oliver
- Recap, Game Book

Game information

First quarter

- NYG – Ike Hilliard 46-yard pass from Kerry Collins (Brad Daluiso kick), 13:03. Giants 7–0. Drive: 4 plays, 74 yards, 1:57.
- NYG – Greg Comella 18-yard pass from Kerry Collins (Brad Daluiso kick), 12:47. Giants 14–0. Drive: 1 play, 18 yards, 0:06.

Second quarter

- NYG – Brad Daluiso 21-yard field goal, 14:56. Giants 17–0. Drive: 6 plays, 37 yards, 3:10.
- NYG – Joe Jurevicius 8-yard pass from Kerry Collins (Brad Daluiso kick), 10:24. Giants 24–0. Drive: 5 plays, 71 yards, 2:42.
- NYG – Brad Daluiso 22-yard field goal, 5:22. Giants 27–0. Drive: 10 plays, 62 yards, 3:27.
- NYG – Ike Hilliard 7-yard pass from Kerry Collins (Brad Daluiso kick), 0:12. Giants 34–0. Drive: 10 plays, 77 yards, 3:19.

Third quarter

- NYG – Amani Toomer 7-yard pass from Kerry Collins (Brad Daluiso kick), 12:06. Giants 41–0. Drive: 5 plays, 29 yards, 2:35.

Fourth quarter

- No scoring plays.

Top passers

- MIN – Daunte Culpepper – 13/28, 78 yards, 3 INT
- NYG – Kerry Collins – 28/39, 381 yards, 5 TD, 2 INT

Top rushers

- MIN – Robert Smith – 7 rushes, 44 yards
- NYG – Tiki Barber – 12 rushes, 69 yards

Top receivers

- MIN – Cris Carter – 3 receptions, 24 yards
- NYG – Ike Hilliard – 10 receptions, 155 yards, 2 TD

== Statistics ==
=== Team leaders ===
| Category | Player(s) | Total |
|---|---|---|
| Passing yards | Daunte Culpepper | 3,937 |
| Passing touchdowns | Daunte Culpepper | 33 |
| Rushing yards | Robert Smith | 1,521 |
| Rushing touchdowns | Robert Smith; Daunte Culpepper | 7 |
| Receiving yards | Randy Moss | 1,437 |
| Receiving touchdowns | Randy Moss | 15 |
| Points | Gary Anderson | 111 |
| Kickoff return yards | Troy Walters | 692 |
| Punt return yards | Troy Walters | 217 |
| Tackles | Ed McDaniel | 118 |
| Sacks | John Randle | 8 |
| Interceptions | Robert Tate; Kailee Wong | 2 |
| Forced fumbles | John Randle; Robert Tate | 2 |

=== League rankings ===
| Category | Total yards | Yards per game | NFL rank (out of 31) |
|---|---|---|---|
| Passing offense | 3,832 | 239.5 | 7th |
| Rushing offense | 2,129 | 133.1 | 6th |
| Total offense | 5,961 | 372.6 | 5th |
| Passing defense | 3,913 | 244.6 | 28th |
| Rushing defense | 1,788 | 111.8 | 15th |
| Total defense | 5,701 | 356.3 | 28th |

== Awards and records ==
- Gary Anderson, NFC Special Teams Player of the Week, Week 8
- Mitch Berger, NFC Special Teams Player of the Week, Week 14
- Mitch Berger, NFC Special Teams Player of the Month, December
- Cris Carter, All-NFL Team (as selected by the Associated Press, Pro Football Weekly and the Pro Football Writers of America)
- Cris Carter, NFC Pro Bowl Selection
- Daunte Culpepper, NFC Offensive Player of the Week, Week 6
- Daunte Culpepper, NFC Offensive Player of the Week, Week 12
- Chris Hovan, PFW/Pro Football Writers of America All-Rookie Team
- Randy Moss, All-NFL Team (as selected by the Associated Press, Pro Football Weekly and the Pro Football Writers of America)
- Randy Moss, PFW/PFWA All-Pro Team
- Robert Smith, NFC Offensive Player of the Month, December

== 40-year team ==
The Vikings named an all-time team in 2000 in recognition of the franchise's 40th year in the NFL.

- Offense
  - WR: Ahmad Rashad, Cris Carter
  - T: Ron Yary, Tim Irwin
  - G: Ed White, Randall McDaniel
  - C: Mick Tingelhoff
  - TE: Steve Jordan
  - QB: Fran Tarkenton
  - RB: Chuck Foreman, Robert Smith
  - K: Fred Cox
  - ST: Bill Brown
- Defense
  - DE: Jim Marshall, Carl Eller
  - DT: Alan Page, John Randle
  - LB: Jeff Siemon, Matt Blair, Scott Studwell
  - S: Paul Krause, Joey Browner
  - CB: Bobby Bryant, Carl Lee
  - P: Greg Coleman
  - RS: Darrin Nelson
- Head coach: Bud Grant
