= 2000 Chicago Bears season =

NFL team season

- Owner: Virginia Halas McCaskey
- Head coach: Dick Jauron
- Offensive coordinator: Gary Crowton
- Defensive coordinator: Greg Blache
- Home stadium: Soldier Field

Results
- Record: 5–11
- Division place: 5th NFC Central
- Playoffs: Did not qualify
- Pro Bowlers: Brian Urlacher, LB

The 2000 season was the Chicago Bears' 81st in the National Football League (NFL). The team failed to improve on their 6–10 from 1999, finishing with a 5–11 record under head coach Dick Jauron. The season saw the addition of rookie sensation Brian Urlacher who would win the NFL Defensive Rookie of the Year Award.

The Bears in 2000 played an NFL record 13 games against opponents that ended the season with a winning record, including four in their own division twice each; the Bears had a record of 4–9 against these teams.

== Offseason ==
| Additions | Subtractions |
|---|---|
| DE Phillip Daniels (Seahawks) | WR Curtis Conway (Chargers) |
| WR Eddie Kennison (Saints) | LB Ricardo McDonald (Broncos) |
| CB R. W. McQuarters (49ers) | TE Ryan Wetnight (Packers) |
| CB Thomas Smith (Bills) | P Todd Sauerbrun (Chiefs) |
| S Shawn Wooden (Dolphins) | DT Shane Burton (Jets) |
| DB Ray McElroy (Colts) | LB Keith Burns (Broncos) |
| DT Brad Culpepper (Buccaneers) | |

=== NFL draft ===
2000 Chicago Bears draft
| Round | Pick | Player | Position | College | Notes |
| 1 | 9 | Brian Urlacher * ^{†} | Linebacker | New Mexico | |
| 2 | 39 | Mike Brown * | Safety | Nebraska | |
| 3 | 69 | Dez White | Wide receiver | Georgia Tech | |
| 3 | 87 | Dustin Lyman | Tight end | Wake Forest | |
| 4 | 125 | Reggie Austin | Cornerback | Wake Forest | |
| 6 | 170 | Frank Murphy | Wide receiver | Kansas State | |
| 6 | 174 | Paul Edinger | Kicker | Michigan State | |
| 7 | 223 | James Cotton | Defensive end | Ohio State | |
| 7 | 254 | Michael Green | Safety | Northwestern State | Mr. Irrelevant |
Made roster † Pro Football Hall of Fame * Made at least one Pro Bowl during career

=== Undrafted free agents ===
2000 undrafted free agents of note
| Player | Position | College |
|---|---|---|
| Derrick Foster | Running back | Texas A&M–Kingsville |
| Marlion Jackson | Running back | Saginaw Valley State |
| Ahmad Merritt | Wide receiver | Wisconsin |
| Damon Nivens | Tackle | Southern |
| Gannon Shepard | Tackle | Duke |
| Brad Williams | Guard | Notre Dame |

== Staff ==
2000 Chicago Bears staff
| Front office: Chairman emeritus – Ed McCaskey; Chairman of the board – Michael McCaskey; Secretary – Virginia Halas McCaskey; President and CEO – Ted Phillips; Vice president of player personnel – Mark Hatley; Director of college scouting – Bill Rees; Director of pro personnel – Scott Campbell; Head coaches: Head coach – Dick Jauron; Offensive coaches: Offensive coordinator – Gary Crowton; Quarterbacks/Interim Offensive Coordinator – John Shoop; Running backs – Earle Mosley; Wide receivers – Mike Borich; Tight ends – Jim Bollman; Offensive line – Bob Wylie; Offensive quality control – Eric Studesville | Defensive coaches: Defensive coordinator – Greg Blache; Defensive line – Rex Norris; Linebackers – Dale Lindsey; Defensive backs – Vance Bedford; Defensive quality control – Chuck Bullough; Special teams coaches: Special teams – Keith Armstrong; Strength and conditioning: Physical development coordinator – Russ Riederer; Assistant physical development coordinator – Steve Little |

== Roster ==
2000 Chicago Bears roster
| Quarterbacks (QB): 11 Mark Hartsell; 9 Shane Matthews; 8 Cade McNown; Running backs (RB): 20 James Allen; 32 Marlon Barnes; 38 Brian Edwards; 44 Curtis Enis; 24 Glyn Milburn; Wide receivers (WR): 87 D'Wayne Bates; 86 Marty Booker; 83 Macey Brooks; 82 Eddie Kennison; 80 Dez White; Tight ends (TE): 45 Scott Dragos; 89 Dustin Lyman; 85 Kaseem Sinceno | Offensive linemen (OL): 78 Blake Brockermeyer T; 74 Jimmy Herndon T; 75 Todd Perry G; 64 Rex Tucker G; 58 Chris Villarrial G; 60 Casey Wiegmann C; 71 James Williams T; 68 Ty Wise C; 79 Jerry Wisne T; Defensive linemen (DL): 70 Alfonso Boone DT; 76 Brad Culpepper DT; 99 Jim Flanigan DT; 98 Bryan Robinson DE/DT; 96 Clyde Simmons DE; 90 Van Tuinei DE; 66 Al Wallace DE; 97 Mike Wells DT; 95 Troy Wilson DE | Linebackers (LB): 59 Rosevelt Colvin OLB; 55 Sean Harris OLB; 52 Bobbie Howard OLB; 92 Barry Minter MLB; 91 Khari Samuel OLB; 54 Brian Urlacher MLB; Defensive backs (DB): 23 Jerry Azumah CB; 30 Mike Brown FS; 43 Mike Green SS; 47 Ray McElroy CB/S; 26 Todd McMillon CB; 21 R. W. McQuarters CB; 37 Tony Parrish SS; 29 Frankie Smith CB/S; 25 Thomas Smith CB; 22 Shawn Wooden FS; Special teams (ST): 10 Louie Aguiar P; 2 Paul Edinger K; 65 Patrick Mannelly LS | Practice squad: 48 Shonn Bell TE; 46 Jerome King CB; 69 Michael Lies G; 16 Ahmad Merritt WR; 63 Brad Williams G (IR); Reserve: 84 John Allred TE (IR); 39 Reggie Austin CB (IR); 12 Brent Bartholomew P (IR); 93 Phillip Daniels DE (IR); 31 Cedric Donaldson CB (IR); 81 Bobby Engram WR (IR); 27 Walt Harris CB (IR); 53 Warrick Holdman LB (IR); 57 Olin Kreutz C (IR); 17 Chad Mackey WR (IR); 15 Jim Miller QB (IR); 62 Robert Newkirk DT (IR); 88 Marcus Robinson WR (IR); 14 Sulecio Sanford WR (IR); Rookies in italics 53 active, 15 reserve, 4 practice squad |

== Preseason ==
| Week | Date | Opponent | Result | Record | Venue |
|---|---|---|---|---|---|
| 1 | August 5 | at New York Giants | W 20–8 | 1–0 | Giants Stadium |
| 2 | August 12 | Cleveland Browns | W 19–6 | 2–0 | Soldier Field |
| 3 | August 19 | at Cincinnati Bengals | L 20–24 | 2–1 | Paul Brown Stadium |
| 4 | August 25 | Tennessee Titans | L 28–34 | 2–2 | Soldier Field |

== Regular season ==
=== Schedule ===
| Week | Date | Opponent | Result | Record | Venue | Attendance |
|---|---|---|---|---|---|---|
| 1 | September 3 | at Minnesota Vikings | L 27–30 | 0–1 | Hubert H. Humphrey Metrodome | 64,104 |
| 2 | September 10 | at Tampa Bay Buccaneers | L 0–41 | 0–2 | Raymond James Stadium | 65,569 |
| 3 | September 17 | New York Giants | L 7–14 | 0–3 | Soldier Field | 66,944 |
| 4 | September 24 | Detroit Lions | L 14–21 | 0–4 | Soldier Field | 66,944 |
| 5 | October 1 | at Green Bay Packers | W 27–24 | 1–4 | Lambeau Field | 59,869 |
| 6 | October 8 | New Orleans Saints | L 10–31 | 1–5 | Soldier Field | 66,944 |
| 7 | October 15 | Minnesota Vikings | L 16–28 | 1–6 | Soldier Field | 66,944 |
| 8 | October 22 | at Philadelphia Eagles | L 9–13 | 1–7 | Veterans Stadium | 65,553 |
| 9 | Bye | | | | | |
| 10 | November 5 | Indianapolis Colts | W 27–24 | 2–7 | Soldier Field | 66,944 |
| 11 | November 12 | at Buffalo Bills | L 3–20 | 2–8 | Ralph Wilson Stadium | 72,420 |
| 12 | November 19 | Tampa Bay Buccaneers | W 13–10 | 3–8 | Soldier Field | 66,944 |
| 13 | November 26 | at New York Jets | L 10–17 | 3–9 | Giants Stadium | 77,354 |
| 14 | December 3 | Green Bay Packers | L 6–28 | 3–10 | Soldier Field | 56,146 |
| 15 | December 10 | New England Patriots | W 24–17 | 4–10 | Soldier Field | 66,944 |
| 16 | December 17 | at San Francisco 49ers | L 0–17 | 4–11 | 3Com Park | 68,306 |
| 17 | December 24 | at Detroit Lions | W 23–20 | 5–11 | Pontiac Silverdome | 71,957 |

=== Game summaries ===
==== Week 1: at Minnesota Vikings ====
Week 1: Chicago Bears at Minnesota Vikings

| Quarter | 1 | 2 | 3 | 4 | Total |
|---|---|---|---|---|---|
| Bears | 7 | 6 | 7 | 7 | 27 |
| Vikings | 6 | 3 | 7 | 14 | 30 |

at Hubert H. Humphrey Metrodome, Minneapolis, Minnesota

- Date: September 3
- Game time: 12:00 p.m. CDT
- Game weather: None (indoor stadium)
- Game attendance: 64,104
- Referee: Ed Hochuli (85)
- TV announcers (FOX): Kenny Albert, Tim Green
- Recap, Game Book

Game information

First quarter

- MIN – Gary Anderson 35-yard field goal, 10:16. Vikings 3–0. Drive: 8 plays, 54 yards, 4:44.
- CHI – John Allred 18-yard pass from Cade McNown (Paul Edinger kick), 3:58. Bears 7–3. Drive: 11 plays, 78 yards, 6:18.
- MIN – Gary Anderson 38-yard field goal, 1:16. Bears 7–6. Drive: 5 plays, 38 yards, 2:42.

Second quarter

- CHI – Paul Edinger 29-yard field goal, 5:19. Bears 10–6. Drive: 7 plays, 45 yards, 3:38.
- MIN – Gary Anderson 45-yard field goal, 1:51. Bears 10–9. Drive: 7 plays, 31 yards, 3:28.
- CHI – Paul Edinger 49-yard field goal, 0:16. Bears 13–9. Drive: 12 plays, 36 yards, 1:35.

Third quarter

- CHI – Marcus Robinson 48-yard pass from Cade McNown (Paul Edinger kick), 10:10. Bears 20–9. Drive: 8 plays, 74 yards, 4:50.
- MIN – Daunte Culpepper 1-yard run (Gary Anderson kick), 5:24. Bears 20–16. Drive: 9 plays, 72 yards, 4:46.

Fourth quarter

- MIN – Daunte Culpepper 7-yard run (Gary Anderson kick), 10:59. Vikings 23–20. Drive: 6 plays, 93 yards, 3:15.
- MIN – Daunte Culpepper 4-yard run (Gary Anderson kick), 4:35. Vikings 30–20. Drive: 7 plays, 81 yards, 2:30.
- CHI – Cade McNown 8-yard run (Paul Edinger kick), 1:17. Vikings 30–27. Drive: 10 plays, 75 yards, 3:18.

Top passers

- CHI – Cade McNown – 27/41, 290 yards, 2 TD
- MIN – Daunte Culpepper – 13/23, 190 yards, INT

Top rushers

- CHI – Cade McNown – 10 rushes, 87 yards, TD
- MIN – Robert Smith – 14 rushes, 109 yards

Top receivers

- CHI – Marcus Robinson – 7 receptions, 86 yards, TD
- MIN – Randy Moss – 4 receptions, 89 yards

==== Week 3: vs New York Giants ====
Week 3: Chicago Bears vs New York Giants

| Quarter | 1 | 2 | 3 | 4 | Total |
|---|---|---|---|---|---|
| Giants | 7 | 0 | 7 | 0 | 14 |
| Bears | 0 | 7 | 0 | 0 | 7 |

at Soldier Field, Chicago, Illinois

- Date: September 17
- Game time: 3:15 p.m. CDT
- Game weather: Mostly sunny, 79 °F (26 °C)
- Game attendance: 66,944
- Referee: Dick Hantak
- TV announcers (Fox): Pat Summerall, John Madden and D. J. Johnson

Game information

First quarter

- NYG – Ron Dixon 34-yard pass from Kerry Collins (Brad Daluiso kick), 10:38. Giants 7–0. Drive: 8 plays, 80 yards, 4:22.

Second quarter

- CHI – Eddie Kennison 2-yard pass from Cade McNown (Paul Edinger kick), 0:14. Tied 7–7. Drive: 12 plays, 74 yards, 3:02.

Third quarter

- NYG – Tiki Barber 3-yard run (Brad Daluiso kick), 5:26. Giants 14–7. Drive: 6 plays, 43 yards, 2:50.

Fourth quarter

- No scoring plays.

Top passers

- NYG – Kerry Collins – 24/33, 251 yards, TD
- CHI – Cade McNown – 23/36, 202 yards, TD

Top rushers

- NYG – Tiki Barber – 17 rushes, 86 yards, TD
- CHI – James Allen – 10 rushes, 31 yards

Top receivers

- NYG – Tiki Barber – 6 receptions, 58 yards
- CHI – Marcus Robinson – 9 receptions, 84 yards

==== Week 4: vs Detroit Lions ====
Week 4: Chicago Bears vs Detroit Lions

| Quarter | 1 | 2 | 3 | 4 | Total |
|---|---|---|---|---|---|
| Lions | 7 | 7 | 0 | 7 | 21 |
| Bears | 0 | 0 | 14 | 0 | 14 |

at Soldier Field, Chicago, Illinois

- Date: September 24, 2000
- Game time: 12:00 p.m. CST
- Game weather: Overcast, 58 °F (14 °C)
- Game attendance: 66,944
- TV announcers (Fox): Dick Stockton, Matt Millen

Game information

First quarter

Second quarter

Third quarter

Fourth quarter

Top passers

- DET – Charlie Batch – 20/37, 207 yards, 2 TD, 1 INT
- CHI – Cade McNown – 11/20, 203 yards, 2 TD, 3 INT

Top rushers

- DET – James Stewart – 23 rushes, 71 yards, 1 TD
- CHI – James Allen – 19 rushes, 87 yards

Top receivers

- DET – Germane Crowell – 2 receptions, 65 yards, 1 TD
- CHI – Marcus Robinson – 5 receptions, 95 yards, 1 TD

==== Week 5: at Green Bay Packers ====
Week 5: Chicago Bears at Green Bay Packers

| Quarter | 1 | 2 | 3 | 4 | Total |
|---|---|---|---|---|---|
| Bears | 10 | 7 | 7 | 3 | 27 |
| Packers | 0 | 3 | 7 | 14 | 24 |

at Lambeau Field, Green Bay, Wisconsin

- Date: October 1, 2000
- Game time: 3:15 p.m. CST
- Game weather: Overcast, 72 °F (22 °C)
- Game attendance: 59,869
- TV announcers (Fox): Curt Menefee and Brian Baldinger

Game information

First quarter

Second quarter

Third quarter

Fourth quarter

Top passers

- CHI – Cade McNown – 11/20, 203 yards, 2 TD
- GB – Brett Favre – 31/48, 333 yards, 3 TD, 1 INT

Top rushers

- CHI – James Allen – 24 rushes, 72 yards
- GB – Dorsey Levens – 11 rushes, 24 yards

Top receivers

- CHI – Marcus Robinson – 2 receptions, 126 yards, 2 TD
- GB – Bill Schroeder – 8 receptions, 108 yards, 2 TD

==== Week 7: vs Minnesota Vikings ====
Week 7: Chicago Bears vs Minnesota Vikings

| Quarter | 1 | 2 | 3 | 4 | Total |
|---|---|---|---|---|---|
| Vikings | 0 | 14 | 7 | 7 | 28 |
| Bears | 6 | 3 | 0 | 7 | 16 |

at Soldier Field, Chicago, Illinois

- Date: October 15
- Game time: 7:35 p.m. CDT
- Game weather: None (indoor stadium)
- Game attendance: 66,944
- Referee: Larry Nemmers (20)
- TV announcers (ESPN): Mike Patrick, Joe Theismann, Paul Maguire, and Solomon Wilcots
- Recap, Game Book

Game information

First quarter

- CHI – Dez White 25-yard pass from Cade McNown (run failed), 3:46. Bears 6–0. Drive: 5 plays, 63 yards, 3:13.

Second quarter

- CHI – Paul Edinger 22-yard field goal, 8:58. Bears 9–0. Drive: 10 plays, 76 yards, 4:46.
- MIN – Robert Smith 72-yard run (Gary Anderson kick), 8:35. Bears 9–7. Drive: 1 play, 72 yards, 0:23.
- MIN – Cris Carter 24-yard pass from Daunte Culpepper (Gary Anderson kick), 5:26. Vikings 14–9. Drive: 4 plays, 33 yards, 1:55.

Third quarter

- MIN – Matthew Hatchette 24-yard pass from Daunte Culpepper (Gary Anderson kick), 10:01. Vikings 21–9. Drive: 5 plays, 54 yards, 1:59.

Fourth quarter

- CHI – James Allen 6-yard run (Paul Edinger kick), 14:56. Vikings 21–16. Drive: 9 plays, 74 yards, 4:15.
- MIN – Randy Moss 7-yard pass from Daunte Culpepper (Gary Anderson kick), 9:26. Vikings 28–16. Drive: 9 plays, 59 yards, 5:30.

Top passers

- MIN – Daunte Culpepper – 15/26, 198 yards, 3 TD
- CHI – Cade McNown – 19/33, 210 yards, TD

Top rushers

- MIN – Robert Smith – 23 rushes, 170 yards, TD
- CHI – James Allen – 22 rushes, 71 yards, TD

Top receivers

- MIN – Cris Carter – 7 receptions, 111 yards, TD
- CHI – Marcus Robinson – 7 receptions, 88 yards

==== Week 10: vs Indianapolis Colts ====
Week 10: Chicago Bears vs Indianapolis Colts

| Quarter | 1 | 2 | 3 | 4 | Total |
|---|---|---|---|---|---|
| Colts | 10 | 7 | 7 | 3 | 27 |
| Bears | 0 | 3 | 7 | 14 | 24 |

at Soldier Field, Chicago, Illinois

- Date: November 5, 2000
- Game time: 3:15 p.m. CST
- Game weather: Overcast, 57 °F (14 °C)
- Game attendance: 66,944
- TV announcers (CBS): Ian Eagle and Mark May

Game information

First quarter

Second quarter

Third quarter

Fourth quarter

Top passers

- IND – Peyton Manning – 26/39, 302 yards, 2 TD, INT
- CHI – Jim Miller – 24/35, 203 yards, TD

Top rushers

- IND – Edgerrin James – 17 rushes, 68 yards, TD
- CHI – James Allen – 16 rushes, 85 yards

Top receivers

- IND – Ken Dilger – 5 receptions, 66 yards
- CHI – Marcus Robinson – 8 receptions, 90 yards, TD

== Standings ==
NFC Central
| | W | L | T | PCT | PF | PA | STK |
|---|---|---|---|---|---|---|---|
| ^{(2)} Minnesota Vikings | 11 | 5 | 0 | .688 | 397 | 371 | L3 |
| ^{(5)} Tampa Bay Buccaneers | 10 | 6 | 0 | .625 | 388 | 269 | L1 |
| Green Bay Packers | 9 | 7 | 0 | .563 | 353 | 323 | W4 |
| Detroit Lions | 9 | 7 | 0 | .563 | 307 | 307 | L1 |
| Chicago Bears | 5 | 11 | 0 | .313 | 216 | 355 | W1 |

== Awards and records ==
- Mike Brown, PFW/Pro Football Writers of America All-Rookie Team
- Paul Edinger, PFW/Pro Football Writers of America All-Rookie Team
- Brian Urlacher, NFC Pro Bowl Selection,
- Brian Urlacher, NFL Defensive Rookie of the Month, October
- Brian Urlacher, Associated Press Defensive Rookie of the Year
- Brian Urlacher, Football Digest Defensive Rookie of the Year
- Brian Urlacher, Pro Football Writers of America Defensive Rookie of the Year
- Brian Urlacher, Sports Illustrated Rookie of the Year
- Brian Urlacher, Sporting News Defensive Rookie of the Year
- Brian Urlacher, USA Today Defensive Rookie of the Year
- Brian Urlacher, PFW/Pro Football Writers of America All-Rookie Team
