= 2000 Detroit Lions season =

NFL team season

- Owner: William Clay Ford Sr.
- General manager: Chuck Schmidt
- Head coach: Bobby Ross (resigned November 6, 5-4 record); Gary Moeller (interim; 4-3 record)
- Home stadium: Pontiac Silverdome

Results
- Record: 9–7
- Division place: 4th NFC Central
- Playoffs: Did not qualify
- All-Pros: 1: LB Stephen Boyd (2nd team)
- Pro Bowlers: 3: DT Luther Elliss; LB Stephen Boyd; KR Desmond Howard

Uniform

The 2000 season was the Detroit Lions' 71st in the National Football League (NFL). After a wildcard playoff appearance with an 8–8 record in 1999, the Lions improved to 9–7 in 2000, but missed the playoffs thanks to a Christmas Eve home loss to the 4–11 Chicago Bears, where they blew a 10-point lead in the second quarter.

In the first 12 games, the Lions were 8-4. But, after that, they only won one more time. Nonetheless, this was the Lions' sixth winning season in 10 years, capping one of the best decades in the franchise's history. It was also the franchise's last winning season until 2011.

Head coach Bobby Ross resigned after the ninth game of the season and was replaced by Gary Moeller.

After beating the Jets, 10–7, at Giants Stadium on December 17, the Lions would lose 24 road games in a row and go 0–8 on the road for the coming three years.

== Offseason ==
Additions	Subtractions
RB James Stewart (Jaguars)	QB Gus Frerotte (Broncos)
QB Mike Tomczak (Steelers)	CB Robert Bailey (Ravens)
S Kurt Schulz (Bills)	S Mark Carrier (Redskins)
QB Stoney Case (Ravens)	RB Ron Rivers (Falcons)
	WR Iheanyi Uwaezuoke (Panthers)

=== NFL draft ===
2000 Detroit Lions draft
Round	Pick	Player	Position	College	Notes
1	20	Stockar McDougle	OT	Oklahoma	
2	50	Barrett Green	LB	West Virginia	
3	81	Reuben Droughns	RB	Oregon	
5	145	Todd Franz	S	Tulsa	
6	181	Quinton Reese	DE	Auburn	
7	253	Alfonso Boone	DT	Mt. San Antonio	
Made roster † Pro Football Hall of Fame * Made at least one Pro Bowl during career

=== Undrafted free agents ===
2000 undrafted free agents of note
Player	Position	College
Andrew Bayes	Punter	East Carolina
Steve Brominski	Tight end	Syracuse
Henry Douglas	Wide receiver	North Carolina A&T
Larry Foster	Wide receiver	LSU
Pete Garces	Kicker	Idaho
James Hall	Defensive end	Michigan
Leroy Hodge	Wide receiver	Texas A&M
Casey Jensen	Center	Michigan State
Jeremy Mankins	Guard	Boise State
Nick O’Brien	Guard	Texas A&M–Kingsville
Joe O’Neill	Linebacker	Bowling Green
Sean Powell	Defensive end	New Mexico State
Charlie Sanders	Running back	Emporia State
Andy Vincent	Tackle	Texas A&M
Jimmy Wyrick	Cornerback	Minnesota

== Personnel ==
=== Staff ===
2000 Detroit Lions staff
Front office: Owner and chairman – William Clay Ford Sr.; Vice chairman – William Clay Ford Jr.; Executive vice president and coo – Chuck Schmidt; Vice president of football operations – Larry Lee; Vice president of player personnel – Ron Hughes; Director of pro personnel – Sheldon White; Head coaches: Head coach – Bobby Ross; Offensive coaches: Offensive coordinator – Sylvester Croom; Quarterbacks – Jim Zorn; Running backs – Frank Falks; Wide receivers – Jerry Sullivan; Tight ends – Danny Smith; Offensive line – Golden Pat Ruel; Offensive assistant/special teams assistant – Stan Kwan; Quality control/offense – John Misciagna	Defensive coaches: Defensive coordinator – Larry Peccatiello; Defensive line – Brian Baker; Linebackers – Gary Moeller; Defensive backs – Richard Selcer; Defensive assistant – Don Clemons; Quality control/defense – Dennis Murphy; Special teams coaches: Special teams – Chuck Priefer; Strength and conditioning: Strength and conditioning – Bert Hill; Assistant strength and conditioning – Rob Graf

=== Roster ===
2000 Detroit Lions roster
Quarterbacks (QB): 10 Charlie Batch; 15 Stoney Case; 16 Cory Sauter; Running backs (RB): 31 Mario Bates; 33 Sedrick Irvin; 26 Brock Olivo FB; 30 Cory Schlesinger FB; 34 James Stewart; Wide receivers (WR): 82 Germane Crowell; 17 Larry Foster; 80 Desmond Howard; 84 Herman Moore; 87 Johnnie Morton; 83 Brian Stablein; Tight ends (TE): 89 Walter Rasby; 86 David Sloan	Offensive linemen (OL): 79 Eric Beverly C; 65 Kerlin Blaise G; 76 Barrett Brooks T; 77 Mike Compton; 64 Jeff Hartings G; 73 Stockar McDougle T; 72 Ray Roberts T; 62 Tony Semple; 70 Andy Vincent T; Defensive linemen (DL): 95 Jared DeVries DE; 94 Luther Elliss DT; 63 James Hall DE; 98 James Jones DT; 67 Travis Kirschke DE/DT; 91 Robert Porcher DE; 93 Kelvin Pritchett DT; 97 Tracy Scroggins DE	Linebackers (LB): 55 Allen Aldridge OLB; 57 Stephen Boyd MLB; 50 Chris Claiborne OLB; 54 Barrett Green OLB; 52 Scott Kowalkowski OLB; 58 Clint Kriewaldt OLB; 59 Kevin O'Neill MLB; Defensive backs (DB): 44 Corwin Brown SS; 27 J. B. Brown CB; 39 Lamar Campbell CB; 23 Terry Fair; 25 Jeremy Lincoln CB; 28 Ron Rice SS; 45 Kurt Schulz FS; 42 Ryan Stewart FS; 29 Kywin Supernaw FS; 41 Darnell Walker CB; 38 Marquis Walker CB; Special teams (ST): 4 Jason Hanson K; 19 John Jett P	Practice squad: 90 Carl Bradley DT; 9 Henry Douglas WR; 46 Joe O'Neill FB; 14 Andre Rone WR; Reserve: 24 Kevin Abrams CB (IR); 21 Reuben Droughns RB (IR); 71 Aaron Gibson T (IR); 18 Mike Tomczak QB (IR); 32 Bryant Westbrook CB (IR); 35 Jimmy Wyrick S (IR); Rookies in italics 53 active, 6 reserve, 4 practice squad

== Preseason ==
Week	Date	Opponent	Result	Record	Venue	Recap
1	August 4	New England Patriots	L 10–13	0–1	Pontiac Silverdome	Recap
2	August 12	Buffalo Bills	W 15–13	1–1	Pontiac Silverdome	Recap
3	August 18	at Oakland Raiders	L 17–23	1–2	Network Associates Coliseum	Recap
4	August 25	at Cincinnati Bengals	W 21–13	2–2	Paul Brown Stadium	Recap

== Regular season ==
=== Schedule ===
Week	Date	Opponent	Result	Record	Venue	Attendance
1	September 3	at New Orleans Saints	**W** 14–10	1–0	Louisiana Superdome	64,900
2	September 10	Washington Redskins	**W** 15–10	2–0	Pontiac Silverdome	74,159
3	September 17	**Tampa Bay Buccaneers**	**L** 10–31	2–1	Pontiac Silverdome	76,928
4	September 24	at **Chicago Bears**	**W** 21–14	3–1	Soldier Field	66,944
5	October 1	**Minnesota Vikings**	**L** 24–31	3–2	Pontiac Silverdome	76,438
6	October 8	**Green Bay Packers**	**W** 31–24	4–2	Pontiac Silverdome	77,549
7	Bye					
8	October 19	at **Tampa Bay Buccaneers**	**W** 28–14	5–2	Raymond James Stadium	65,557
9	October 29	at Indianapolis Colts	**L** 18–30	5–3	RCA Dome	56,971
10	November 5	Miami Dolphins	**L** 8–23	5–4	Pontiac Silverdome	77,813
11	November 12	Atlanta Falcons	**W** 13–10	6–4	Pontiac Silverdome	74,309
12	November 19	at New York Giants	**W** 31–21	7–4	Giants Stadium	77,897
13	November 23	New England Patriots	**W** 34–9	8–4	Pontiac Silverdome	77,923
14	November 30	at **Minnesota Vikings**	**L** 17–24	8–5	Hubert H. Humphrey Metrodome	64,214
15	December 10	at **Green Bay Packers**	**L** 13–26	8–6	Lambeau Field	59,854
16	December 17	at New York Jets	**W** 10–7	9–6	Giants Stadium	77,513
17	December 24	**Chicago Bears**	**L** 20–23	9–7	Pontiac Silverdome	71,957
Note: Intra-division opponents are in **bold** text.

=== Game summaries ===
==== Week 6 ====
Team	1	2	3	4	Total
Packers	0	6	11	7	24
• Lions	10	14	7	0	31

- Date: October 8
- Location: Pontiac Silverdome, Pontiac, Michigan
- Game start: 1:00 p.m.
- Game weather: indoors (dome)
- Referee: Larry Nemmers

Scoring summary
1	DET	Jason Hanson 30-yard field goal	Lions 3–0
1	DET	Johnnie Morton 42-yard pass from Charlie Batch (Jason Hanson kick)	Lions 10–0
2	GB	Ryan Longwell 44-yard field goal	Lions 10–3
2	DET	James Stewart 13-yard pass from Charlie Batch (Jason Hanson kick)	Lions 17–3
2	DET	Lamar Campbell 42- interception return (Jason Hanson kick)	Lions 24–3
2	GB	Ryan Longwell 51-yard field goal	Lions 24–6
3	GB	Ryan Longwell 31-yard field goal	Lions 24–9
3	DET	Herman Moore 30-yard pass from Charlie Batch (Jason Hanson kick)	Lions 31–9
3	GB	Antonio Freeman 5-yard pass from Brett Favre (Donald Driver pass from Brett Favre)	Lions 31–17
4	GB	William Henderson 7-yard pass from Brett Favre (Ryan Longwell kick)	Lions 31–24

== Standings ==
NFC Central
	W	L	T	PCT	PF	PA	STK
^{(2)} Minnesota Vikings	11	5	0	.688	397	371	L3
^{(5)} Tampa Bay Buccaneers	10	6	0	.625	388	269	L1
Green Bay Packers	9	7	0	.563	353	323	W4
Detroit Lions	9	7	0	.563	307	307	L1
Chicago Bears	5	11	0	.313	216	355	W1
