= Matt Cercone =

American football player (1975–2009)

No. 48, 87, 88, 89
- Position: Tight end

Personal information
- Born: November 30, 1975; Bakersfield, California
- Died: November 27, 2009 (aged 33); Phoenix, Arizona
- Listed height: 6 ft 5 in (1.96 m)
- Listed weight: 252 lb (114 kg)

Career information
- High school: South (Bakersfield, California)
- College: Bakersfield (1995–1996); Arizona State (1997–1998)
- NFL draft: 1999: undrafted

Career history
- Minnesota Vikings (1999)*; Barcelona Dragons (2000); Minnesota Vikings (2000–2002); Barcelona Dragons (2003); Jacksonville Jaguars (2003)*; New England Patriots (2004)*
- * Offseason or practice squad member only

Career NFL statistics
- Games played: 5
- Stats at Pro Football Reference

Matthew Anthony Cercone (November 30, 1975 – November 27, 2009) was an American professional football tight end who played with the Minnesota Vikings of the National Football League and the Barcelona Dragons of NFL Europe. He played college football at Bakersfield College and Arizona State.

== Early life ==
Cercone was born on November 30, 1975, in Bakersfield, California, to Mike and Nancy Cercone. He had one sister, Bronwyn. He attended South High School in Bakersfield, where he played high school football.

== College football career ==
=== Bakersfield College ===
Cercone started attending Bakersfield College in 1995, though he did not play any games his first year. However, in his sophomore year, he was named J. C. Gridwire All-American and first-team All-Western State Conference.

According to Bakersfield head coach Dallas Grider, Cercone "was a typical Kern County kid: a hard-working, tough son of a gun" who "had good agility for a man his size and he could run."

Bakersfield finished 20–2 with two conference titles during the two years that Cercone played for the program.

=== Arizona State University ===
Cercone then transferred to Arizona State University, where he played in 1997 and 1998 for the Sun Devils. He was used as a spot start tight end and was noted for being good at run and pass blocking.

In 1997, he recorded 8 receptions for 99 yards, scoring two touchdowns. In 1998, he recorded 10 receptions for 102 yards and scored one touchdown.

== Professional football career ==
=== Minnesota Vikings (first stint) ===
After going undrafted in the 1999 NFL draft, Cercone was signed as a rookie free agent by the Minnesota Vikings on April 26, 1999. He spent training camp with the Vikings, but was ultimately released on August 30.

The Vikings re-signed him to the team on February 1, 2000, and put him on the practice squad on February 5.

=== Barcelona Dragons (first stint) ===
On February 22, 2000, the Vikings allocated Cercone to NFL Europe. He then spent the spring of 2000 playing with the Barcelona Dragons. He played in all ten games and made six receptions for 44 yards, scoring one touchdown.

=== Minnesota Vikings (second stint) ===
==== 2000 season ====
On August 29, 2000, Cercone was signed to the Vikings' practice squad. He was promoted to the regular roster on November 15 to play in two games: a November 19 matchup against the Carolina Panthers and a November 23 matchup against the Dallas Cowboys. Both games were wins for the Vikings. He was inactive for a November 30 game against the Detroit Lions, and re-signed to the practice squad on December 6. He remained there through the end of the postseason.

==== 2001 season ====
Cercone spent 15 weeks of the 2001 season on the practice squad, being placed on the 53-man roster for one game (a Week 2 game against the Chicago Bears) that he did not play in.

==== 2002 season ====
Cercone was promoted to the Vikings' active roster on September 5, 2002, but was inactive for the first game of the season. He played in the next three games, which were against the Buffalo Bills, the Carolina Panthers, and the Seattle Seahawks. The Vikings lost all three games, and waived Cercone on October 1. He stayed out of football until the spring of the following year.

=== Barcelona Dragons (second stint) ===
In 2003, Cercone joined the Barcelona Dragons again for their final season. He started all ten games and caught eleven passes for 115 yards and a touchdown. He was also used on kickoff returns, recording 31 yards over three returns.

=== Jacksonville Jaguars ===
On January 27, 2003, the Jacksonville Jaguars signed Cercone. He went to play for the Dragons in the spring of that year, but his contract with the Jaguars remained in effect until August 30, 2003, when he was waived by the team.

=== New England Patriots ===
Cercone was signed by the New England Patriots on July 23, 2004. He was released by the team eight days later, on August 1.

== Death ==
Cercone died in his sleep in Phoenix, Arizona, on November 27, 2009, three days before his 34th birthday.
