= Michael Sauer (ice hockey) =

American ice hockey player (born 1987)

- Born: August 7, 1987 (age 39) St. Cloud, Minnesota, U.S.
- Height: 6 ft 3 in (191 cm)
- Weight: 220 lb (100 kg; 15 st 10 lb)
- Position: Defense
- Shot: Right
- Played for: New York Rangers
- NHL draft: 40th overall, 2005; New York Rangers
- Playing career: 2007–2011

Michael Curtis Sauer (born August 7, 1987) is an American former professional ice hockey defenseman who played three seasons in the National Hockey League (NHL) with the New York Rangers. He is the younger brother of former Phoenix Coyotes, Mighty Ducks of Anaheim, and Colorado Avalanche defenseman Kurt Sauer, and of former Atlanta Falcons and Minnesota Vikings (NFL) linebacker Craig Sauer. Sauer was born in St. Cloud, Minnesota, but grew up in Sartell, Minnesota.

== Playing career ==
He was drafted in the 2nd round, 40th overall by the New York Rangers in the 2005 NHL entry draft; the Rangers acquired this draft pick from the Toronto Maple Leafs as part of the Brian Leetch trade a year prior.

Sauer signed his first professional contract with the Rangers on August 8, 2006. He played for the Rangers' minor league affiliate in Hartford of the AHL for most of the 2007-2008 and 2008-2009 seasons, and was promoted to the Rangers on March 23, 2009. He made his NHL debut with the Rangers at Madison Square Garden on March 24, 2009, against the Minnesota Wild.

After spending all of 2009 with Hartford, Sauer began the 2010 season in the NHL with the Rangers and was in the Rangers' opening night lineup. He scored his first NHL goal on December 9, 2010, against Brian Elliott of the Ottawa Senators. On July 8, 2011, Sauer, a restricted free agent, re-signed with the Rangers to a two-year, $2.5 million deal.

Sauer suffered a concussion as a result of a hard hit by Dion Phaneuf on December 5, 2011. No penalty was assessed and he has not played since. After the 2012-13 season, Sauer's contract expired and he did not receive a qualifying offer, making him an unrestricted free agent.

== Career statistics ==
			Regular season					Playoffs
Season	Team	League	GP	G	A	Pts	PIM	GP	G	A	Pts	PIM
2003–04	Technical Senior High School	HSMN	18	12	16	28	34	—	—	—	—	—
2004–05	Portland Winterhawks	WHL	32	2	11	13	10	—	—	—	—	—
2005–06	Portland Winterhawks	WHL	59	8	23	31	68	12	4	2	6	8
2006–07	Portland Winterhawks	WHL	33	4	8	12	46	—	—	—	—	—
2006–07	Medicine Hat Tigers	WHL	32	1	10	11	29	23	1	5	6	34
2007–08	Hartford Wolf Pack	AHL	71	4	7	11	80	2	0	0	0	0
2008–09	New York Rangers	NHL	3	0	0	0	0	—	—	—	—	—
2008–09	Hartford Wolf Pack	AHL	64	6	17	23	35	6	0	0	0	10
2009–10	Hartford Wolf Pack	AHL	42	3	9	12	45	—	—	—	—	—
2010–11	New York Rangers	NHL	76	3	12	15	75	5	0	1	1	0
2011–12	New York Rangers	NHL	19	1	2	3	21	—	—	—	—	—
AHL totals			177	13	33	46	160	8	0	0	0	10
NHL totals			98	4	14	18	96	5	0	1	1	0
