= Kurt Sauer =

American ice hockey player (born 1981)

- Born: January 16, 1981 (age 45) St. Cloud, Minnesota, U.S.
- Height: 6 ft 4 in (193 cm)
- Weight: 250 lb (113 kg; 17 st 12 lb)
- Position: Defense
- Shot: Left
- Played for: Mighty Ducks of Anaheim; Colorado Avalanche; Phoenix Coyotes
- NHL draft: 88th overall, 2000; Colorado Avalanche
- Playing career: 2002–2010

Kurt Christopher Sauer (born January 16, 1981) is an American former professional ice hockey defenseman who played seven seasons in the National Hockey League (NHL). He played for the Mighty Ducks of Anaheim, Colorado Avalanche, and Phoenix Coyotes. Sauer was born in St. Cloud, Minnesota, but grew up in Sartell, Minnesota. Sauer is now the Assistant Coach for the Wayzata Bantam AA hockey team.

== Playing career ==
Sauer was drafted 88th overall in the 2000 NHL entry draft by the Colorado Avalanche. Sauer remained unsigned and continued to play for his junior team the Spokane Chiefs. Unable to agree to a contract with the Avalanche, in June 2002, Sauer was signed by the Mighty Ducks of Anaheim on the influence of new coach Mike Babcock, who coached Sauer at the Spokane Chiefs.

In Sauer's first professional season in 2002–03, he made the jump to the NHL with Anaheim and was amongst the league leaders for worst Plus/Minus. The following year, on February 21, 2004, Sauer was traded to the team that drafted him, the Colorado Avalanche, in exchange for Martin Škoula. Sauer spent the next four-and-a-half years with the Avalanche used as one of their primary shut down defenseman when not hampered by injury before leaving as a free agent.

On July 1, 2008, Sauer signed a four-year free agent contract with the Phoenix Coyotes worth an average of $1.75 million per year. In his first season with the Coyotes in 2008–09, Sauer played his most regular season games since his rookie year with 68 games, scoring 7 points.

In preparation for the 2009–10 season, Sauer was initially injured in a September pre-season game against the Anaheim Ducks. In receiving an innocuous hit into the boards, Sauer's head whip-lashed and resulted in nerve damage through the neck and head which blurred his eyesight. Sauer continued to practice and played in the season opener against the Los Angeles Kings on October 2, 2009, but was still affected by his eyesight. Scratched for conditioning, Sauer suffered the symptoms of post-concussion syndrome. He continued to rehabilitate, but by the All-Star Game break, in February he was ruled out for the season after still suffering major symptoms and swelling.

Despite intensive therapy programs and numerous specialist visits, Sauer was unable to gain a clear diagnosis and remained sidelined with concussion symptoms for the remaining three years of his contract with the Coyotes. Although unlikely to ever resume his professional career, he was still hopeful of a return and made slow progress through sensory rehabilitation to restore brain balance.

== Personal life ==
Kurt and wife Carmen have six children together.

Sauer comes from a distinguished sports family. His father, Curt, played professional baseball in the Minnesota Twins system. He is the older brother of Michael Sauer, a former defenseman who played for the New York Rangers whose career was also ended by concussions. In addition to younger brother, Michael, an older brother, Kent, was a draftee of the Nashville Predators who was forced to retire due to knee problems. His oldest brother Craig played college football at the University of Minnesota and played in the NFL with the Atlanta Falcons and the Minnesota Vikings until a foot injury forced him into retirement. He also has two sisters that played college basketball and soccer.

== Career statistics ==
			Regular season					Playoffs
Season	Team	League	GP	G	A	Pts	PIM	GP	G	A	Pts	PIM
1998–99	North Iowa Huskies	USHL	52	1	4	5	67	—	—	—	—	—
1999–2000	Spokane Chiefs	WHL	71	3	12	15	48	15	2	1	3	8
2000–01	Spokane Chiefs	WHL	48	5	10	15	85	3	1	0	1	2
2001–02	Spokane Chiefs	WHL	61	4	19	23	73	11	0	3	3	12
2002–03	Mighty Ducks of Anaheim	NHL	80	1	2	3	74	21	1	1	2	6
2003–04	Mighty Ducks of Anaheim	NHL	55	1	4	5	32	—	—	—	—	—
2003–04	Colorado Avalanche	NHL	14	0	1	1	19	3	0	0	0	0
2005–06	Lowell Lock Monsters	AHL	4	0	0	0	0	—	—	—	—	—
2005–06	Colorado Avalanche	NHL	37	1	4	5	24	9	0	0	0	4
2006–07	Colorado Avalanche	NHL	48	0	6	6	24	—	—	—	—	—
2007–08	Colorado Avalanche	NHL	54	1	5	6	41	10	1	0	1	8
2008–09	Phoenix Coyotes	NHL	68	1	6	7	36	—	—	—	—	—
2009–10	Phoenix Coyotes	NHL	1	0	0	0	0	—	—	—	—	—
NHL totals			357	5	28	33	250	43	2	1	3	18

== Awards and honors ==
Award	Year
WHL
West First All-Star Team	2002
