= 2001 Pro Bowl =

National Football League all-star game

2001 NFL Pro Bowl
NFC	AFC
17	38
Head coach: Dennis Green (Minnesota Vikings)	Head coach: Jon Gruden (Oakland Raiders)
	1	2	3	4	Total
NFC	0	3	14	0	17
AFC	14	10	7	7	38
- Date: February 4, 2001
- Stadium: Aloha Stadium; Honolulu, Hawaii
- MVP: Rich Gannon (Oakland Raiders)
- Referee: Bob McElwee
- Attendance: 50,301

Ceremonies
- National anthem: Dream
- Halftime show: 98 Degrees

TV in the United States
- Network: ABC
- Announcers: Al Michaels, Dan Fouts, Dennis Miller, Eric Dickerson and Melissa Stark

The 2001 Pro Bowl was the NFL's all-star game for the 2000 season. The game was played on February 4, 2001, at Aloha Stadium in Honolulu, Hawaii. The final score was AFC 38, NFC 17. Rich Gannon of the Oakland Raiders was the game's MVP.

== AFC roster ==
=== Offense ===
Position:	Starters:	Reserves:
Quarterback	12 Rich Gannon, Oakland	18 Peyton Manning, Indianapolis; 14 Brian Griese, Denver^{[b]} 9 Steve McNair, Tennessee^{[b]} 18 Elvis Grbac, Kansas City^{[a]}
Running back	32 Edgerrin James, Indianapolis	27 Eddie George, Tennessee; 28 Corey Dillon, Cincinnati
Fullback	20 Richie Anderson, N.Y. Jets	
Wide receiver	88 Marvin Harrison, Indianapolis; 80 Eric Moulds, Buffalo	82 Jimmy Smith, Jacksonville; 80 Rod Smith, Denver
Tight end	88 Tony Gonzalez, Kansas City	89 Frank Wycheck, Tennessee
Offensive tackle	71 Tony Boselli, Jacksonville^{[b]} 72 Brad Hopkins, Tennessee^{[c]} 75 Jonathan Ogden, Baltimore	72 Lincoln Kennedy, Oakland^{[a]}
Offensive guard	79 Ruben Brown, Buffalo; 74 Bruce Matthews, Tennessee^{[b]} 76 Steve Wisniewski, Oakland^{[c]}	68 Will Shields, Kansas City^{[a]}
Center	68 Kevin Mawae, N.Y. Jets	66 Tom Nalen, Denver^{[b]} 61 Tim Ruddy, Miami^{[a]}

=== Defense ===
Position:	Starters:	Reserves:
Defensive end	93 Trace Armstrong, Miami; 99 Jason Taylor, Miami	90 Jevon Kearse, Tennessee
Defensive tackle	95 Sam Adams, Baltimore; 93 Trevor Pryce, Denver	92 Ted Washington, Buffalo
Outside linebacker	57 Mo Lewis, N.Y. Jets; 55 Junior Seau, San Diego	92 Jason Gildon, Pittsburgh
Inside linebacker	52 Ray Lewis, Baltimore	56 Sam Cowart, Buffalo; 54 Zach Thomas, Miami^{[d]}
Cornerback	29 Sam Madison, Miami; 21 Samari Rolle, Tennessee	24 Charles Woodson, Oakland
Free safety	26 Rod Woodson, Baltimore	31 Brock Marion, Miami
Strong safety	23 Blaine Bishop, Tennessee	

=== Special teams ===
Position:	Player:
Punter	2 Darren Bennett, San Diego
Placekicker	3 Matt Stover, Baltimore
Kick returner	85 Derrick Mason, Tennessee
Special teamer	53 Larry Izzo, Miami

== NFC roster ==
=== Offense ===
Position:	Starters:	Reserves:
Quarterback	11 Daunte Culpepper, Minnesota	5 Jeff Garcia, San Francisco; 13 Kurt Warner, St. Louis^{[b]} 5 Donovan McNabb, Philadelphia^{[a]}
Running back	28 Marshall Faulk, St. Louis^{[b]} 25 Charlie Garner, San Francisco^{[c]}	26 Robert Smith, Minnesota^{[b]} 48 Stephen Davis, Washington^{[a]} 28 Warrick Dunn, Tampa Bay^{[a]}
Fullback	40 Mike Alstott, Tampa Bay	
Wide receiver	80 Isaac Bruce, St. Louis^{[b]} 84 Randy Moss, Minnesota^{[b]} 80 Cris Carter, Minnesota^{[c]} 81 Terrell Owens, San Francisco^{[c]}	87 Joe Horn, New Orleans^{[a]} 88 Torry Holt, St. Louis^{[a]}
Tight end	89 Chad Lewis, Philadelphia	80 Stephen Alexander, Washington
Offensive tackle	76 Orlando Pace, St. Louis; 77 Willie Roaf, New Orleans	77 Korey Stringer, Minnesota
Offensive guard	73 Larry Allen, Dallas; 64 Randall McDaniel, Tampa Bay	65 Ron Stone, N.Y. Giants
Center	62 Jeff Christy, Tampa Bay	78 Matt Birk, Minnesota

=== Defense ===
Position:	Starters:	Reserves:
Defensive end	53 Hugh Douglas, Philadelphia; 94 Joe Johnson, New Orleans	99 Marco Coleman, Washington
Defensive tackle	97 La'Roi Glover, New Orleans; 99 Warren Sapp, Tampa Bay	94 Luther Elliss, Detroit
Outside linebacker	98 Jessie Armstead, N.Y. Giants; 55 Derrick Brooks, Tampa Bay	59 Keith Mitchell, New Orleans
Inside linebacker	57 Stephen Boyd, Detroit^{[b]} 54 Jeremiah Trotter, Philadelphia^{[c]}	54 Brian Urlacher, Chicago^{[a]} 55 Mark Fields, New Orleans^{[d]}
Cornerback	24 Champ Bailey, Washington; 23 Troy Vincent, Philadelphia	21 Donnie Abraham, Tampa Bay
Free safety	42 Darren Sharper, Green Bay	
Strong safety	24 Robert Griffith, Minnesota	47 John Lynch, Tampa Bay

=== Special teams ===
Position:	Player:
Punter	10 Scott Player, Arizona
Placekicker	7 Martin Gramatica, Tampa Bay
Kick returner	80 Desmond Howard, Detroit
Special teamer	24 Michael Bates, Carolina

Notes:

^{a} Replacement selection due to injury or vacancy
^{b} Injured player; selected but did not play
^{c} Replacement starter; selected as reserve
^{d} "Need player"; named by coach

== Officials ==
Name	Position
Bob McElwee (#95)	Referee
Butch Hannah (#40)	Umpire
Paul Weidner (#87)	Head Linesman
Tom Stephan (#68)	Line Judge
Tom Sifferman (#118)	Field Judge
Rick Patterson (#15)	Side Judge
Billy Smith (#2)	Back Judge

== Score ==
Team	Q1	Q2	Q3	Q4	Total
AFC	14	10	7	7	38
NFC	0	3	14	0	17

== Statistics ==
=== Team statistics ===
Statistic	Number (NFC)	Number (AFC)
First downs	20	29

== Number of selections per team ==
AFC team	Selections	NFC team	Selections
Tennessee Titans	9	Tampa Bay Buccaneers	9
Miami Dolphins	7	Minnesota Vikings	8
Baltimore Ravens	5	New Orleans Saints	6
Oakland Raiders	4	Philadelphia Eagles	5
Denver Broncos	4	St. Louis Rams	5
Buffalo Bills	4	Washington Redskins	5
Indianapolis Colts	3	Detroit Lions	3
New York Jets	3	San Francisco 49ers	3
Kansas City Chiefs	3	New York Giants	2
Jacksonville Jaguars	2	Green Bay Packers	1
San Diego Chargers	2	Carolina Panthers	1
Pittsburgh Steelers	1	Dallas Cowboys	1
Cincinnati Bengals	1	Chicago Bears	1
Seattle Seahawks	0	Arizona Cardinals	1
New England Patriots	0	Atlanta Falcons	0
Cleveland Browns	0		
