= Craig Sauer =

American football player (born 1972)

No. 52, 59
- Position: Linebacker

Personal information
- Born: December 13, 1972 (age 53); Sartell, Minnesota, U.S.
- Listed height: 6 ft 1 in (1.85 m)
- Listed weight: 240 lb (109 kg)

Career information
- High school: Sartell
- College: Minnesota
- NFL draft: 1996: 6th round, 188th overall pick

Career history
- Atlanta Falcons (1996–1999); Minnesota Vikings (2000)

Career NFL statistics
- Tackles: 100
- Sacks: 1
- Interceptions: 1
- Stats at Pro Football Reference

Craig Curtis Sauer (born December 13, 1972) is an American former professional football player who was a linebacker in the National Football League (NFL). He played college football for the Minnesota Golden Gophers. He played in the NFL for the Atlanta Falcons from 1996 to 1999 and the Minnesota Vikings in 2000. His father was a professional minor league baseball player and he has three brothers who have played professional ice hockey.

== Football career ==
Sauer played college football at the University of Minnesota. He was selected in the sixth round (188th overall pick) of the 1996 NFL draft by the Atlanta Falcons. He ended up playing more NFL games than all but 12 of the 87 players taken in the last two rounds of that year's draft. As a rookie in 1996, Sauer played in all 16 games for the Falcons, but only started one. He had seven tackles, four assists and one forced fumble that season. In 1997, he once again played in all 16 games and started one. He had eight tackles, one assist and one fumble recovery for the season.

In 1998, he played all 16 games again, and started six, primarily at right linebacker, as the Falcons went on to win the National Football Conference championship and play in the Super Bowl. He set a career high with 29 tackles, and also had five assists and his only career interception, and got to play in Super Bowl XXXIII. In 1999, he again played all 16 games for the Falcons, starting three. He had 18 tackles, six assists and his only career sack.

Sauer joined the Minnesota Vikings for the 2000 season. In what would be his final NFL season, he played in nine games for the Vikings. He did not start any games, and had only one tackle for the season.

== Family ==
Sauer's father, Curt Sauer was a minor league baseball player in the Minnesota Twins system. Three of his brothers, Kent, Kurt and Michael have played professional ice hockey. Kent Sauer was a 4th round draft pick by the Nashville Predators in 1998, but his professional career was derailed by a knee injury. Kurt was a defenseman who played for three different National Hockey League franchises., while Michael was a defenseman for the National Hockey League's New York Rangers. Both brothers had their careers end prematurely as a result of concussions.
