= Larry Foster (American football) =

American football player (born 1976)

No. 17, 87, 89
- Position: Wide receiver

Personal information
- Born: November 7, 1976 (age 49); Harvey, Louisiana, U.S.
- Listed height: 5 ft 10 in (1.78 m)
- Listed weight: 195 lb (88 kg)

Career information
- High school: West Jefferson (Harvey)
- College: LSU
- NFL draft: 2000: undrafted

Career history
- Detroit Lions (2000–2002); Arizona Cardinals (2003); Carolina Panthers (2004)*
- * Offseason or practice squad member only

Career NFL statistics
- Receptions: 54
- Receiving yards: 617
- Touchdowns: 1
- Stats at Pro Football Reference

Larry D. Foster (born November 7, 1976) is an American former professional football player who was a wide receiver in the National Football League (NFL). He played college football for the LSU Tigers and was signed by the Detroit Lions as an undrafted free agent in 2000.

Foster also played for the Arizona Cardinals.

== NFL career statistics ==
Legend
**Bold**	Career high

Year	Team	Games		Receiving					
Year	Team	GP	GS	Tgt	Rec	Yds	Avg	Lng	TD
2000	DET	10	0	27	17	175	10.3	**40**	**1**
2001	DET	**13**	**5**	**47**	**22**	**283**	**12.9**	36	0
2002	DET	**13**	0	30	14	152	10.9	22	0
2003	ARI	1	1	1	1	7	7.0	7	0
		37	6	105	54	617	11.4	40	1
