= James Allen (running back) =

American football player (born 1975)

No. 20
- Position: Running back

Personal information
- Born: March 28, 1975 (age 51); Wynnewood, Oklahoma, U.S.
- Listed height: 5 ft 10 in (1.78 m)
- Listed weight: 215 lb (98 kg)

Career information
- High school: Wynnewood (OK)
- College: Oklahoma
- NFL draft: 1997: undrafted

Career history
- Tennessee Oilers (1997)*; Philadelphia Eagles (1997)*; Chicago Bears (1997–2001); Houston Texans (2002)
- * Offseason or practice squad member only

Career NFL statistics
- Rushing attempts: 670
- Rushing yards: 2,497
- Rushing touchdowns: 4
- Receptions: 133
- Receiving yards: 964
- Receiving touchdowns: 3
- Stats at Pro Football Reference

James Allen (born March 28, 1975) is an American former professional football player who was a running back in the National Football League (NFL). He played college football for Oklahoma.

== College career ==
Allen attended the University of Oklahoma starting in 1993, and was a true freshman for the Sooners, such as rushing for 102 yards against the Texas Longhorns in a 38–17 victory. He would finish his freshman year with 788 yards rushing and one touchdown. The following year, Allen was stopped at the goal line in a loss to the Longhorns, and was later replaced by De'mond Parker in 1996, though Allen would score the game-winning touchdown that season against the Longhorns, giving the 3–8 Sooners the 30–27 win.

== Professional career ==
Pre-draft measurables
Height	Weight	Arm length	Hand span	Vertical jump	Bench press
5 ft 10 1/8 in (1.78 m)	212 lb (96 kg)	31 7/8 in (0.81 m)	9 in (0.23 m)	31.0 in (0.79 m)	11 reps
All values from NFL Combine

Allen signed with the Chicago Bears on December 10, 1997, though he was released on August 26, 1998. He later was brought back on September 1, and placed on the Bears practice squad. Allen was the Bears starting halfback, and in 2000, he led the team with 1,120 rushing yards and two touchdowns. During the season, Allen became the first Bears player to run for 100 yards since the 1998 season when he ran for 163 yards in his first career start against the Baltimore Ravens. However, in a loss to the New York Jets, Allen fumbled three times. Allen's starting role was claimed by Anthony Thomas in 2001. Against the Cleveland Browns in Week 8, Allen caught the game-tying Hail Mary pass from Shane Matthews that was deflected towards Allen, as the Bears went on to defeat the Browns 27–21.

Allen later played for the expansion Houston Texans in the 2002 season, which was their inaugural season, and started five games for the team, splitting duties with Jonathan Wells. Allen finished second behind Wells in rushing yards for the team with 519 yards. However, in 2003, Allen retired from the NFL to become a rapper under the stage name Mersilis, saying that he "lost a little bit of that fire". Allen had skipped the Texans preseason game against the Denver Broncos due to "personal issues". Two weeks later, Allen decided to unretire, though Texans officials ruled him out of being with the team for the 2003 season, and he was released after not being claimed by any team. In his career, Allen amassed 2,497 yards and four touchdowns.

== NFL career statistics ==
Year	Team	GP	Att	Yds	Avg	Lng	TD	Rec	Yds	Avg	Lng	TD
1998	CHI	6	58	270	4.7	57	1	8	77	9.6	33	1
1999	CHI	12	32	119	3.7	13	0	9	91	10.1	17	0
2000	CHI	16	290	1,120	3.9	29	2	39	291	7.5	26	1
2001	CHI	16	135	469	3.5	19	1	30	203	6.8	34	1
2002	HOU	16	155	519	3.3	32	0	47	302	6.4	21	0
Career		66	670	2,497	3.7	57	4	133	964	7.2	34	3
