= James "Little Man" Stewart =

American football player (born 1971)

James Stewart
No. 33, 34
- Position: Running back

Personal information
- Born: December 27, 1971 (age 54); Morristown, Tennessee, U.S.
- Listed height: 6 ft 1 in (1.85 m)
- Listed weight: 224 lb (102 kg)

Career information
- High school: Morristown West
- College: Tennessee (1991–1994)
- NFL draft: 1995: 1st round, 19th overall pick

Career history
- Jacksonville Jaguars (1995–1999); Detroit Lions (2000–2003)

Awards and highlights
- Second-team All-SEC (1994)

Career NFL statistics
- Rushing yards: 5,841
- Rushing average: 4
- Rushing touchdowns: 48
- Receptions: 220
- Receiving yards: 1,715
- Receiving touchdowns: 9
- Stats at Pro Football Reference

James Ottis “Little Man” Stewart III (born December 27, 1971) is an American former professional football player who was a running back for nine seasons in the National Football League (NFL). He played college football for the Tennessee Volunteers and was selected by the Jacksonville Jaguars in the first round of the 1995 NFL draft. Stewart played in the NFL for the Jaguars and Detroit Lions from 1995 to 2003.

== Early life and college ==
Stewart played football at his high school of Morristown West High School in Morristown, Tennessee. He played college football at the University of Tennessee from 1991 to 1994. He had his only 1,000 yard rushing season his senior year, where he also ran for 11 touchdowns. While he left as the career leader in rushing yards, he's currently at the third most with 2,890, and still has the most rushing touchdowns with 35, in school history.

=== College statistics ===
Year	Team	Class	Pos	G	Rushing				Receiving			
Year	Team	Class	Pos	G	Att	Yds	Avg	TD	Rec	Yds	Avg	TD
1991	Tennessee	FR	RB	11	190	939	4.9	8	18	106	5.9	0
1992	Tennessee	SO	RB	11	85	386	4.5	7	7	121	17.3	1
1993	Tennessee	JR	RB	11	86	537	6.2	9	12	89	7.4	0
1994	Tennessee	SR	RB	11	170	1,028	6.0	11	17	147	8.6	3
Career				44	531	2,890	5.4	35	54	463	8.6	4

== Professional career ==
Pre-draft measurables
Height	Weight	Arm length	Hand span	20-yard shuttle	Vertical jump	Broad jump	Bench press
6 ft 1 3/8 in (1.86 m)	222 lb (101 kg)	32 3/4 in (0.83 m)	8 7/8 in (0.23 m)	4.09 s	38.0 in (0.97 m)	10 ft 3 in (3.12 m)	26 reps
All values from NFL Combine

=== Jacksonville Jaguars ===
Stewart was the second selection by the new expansion Jacksonville Jaguars with the 19th pick of the first round in the 1995 NFL draft. In his rookie season, Stewart led the Jaguars in rushing with 525 yards and had two rushing touchdowns. He led the team again in 1996 with 723 yards and eight touchdowns. He finished the 1997 season with 555 yards and eight touchdowns, however he finished second on the team that year in rushing yards behind teammate Natrone Means. Stewart still holds the franchise record for the most points in a single game (30) and for the most rushing touchdowns in a game (5). Both these records were obtained on October 12, 1997, in a 38–21 Week 7 win over the Philadelphia Eagles. The Jaguars drafted Fred Taylor as their new franchise back in 1998 and, as a result, Stewart only rushed for 217 yards and two touchdowns. Due to injuries to Taylor in 1999, Stewart once again led the team with 931 rushing yards and had a career-high 13 touchdowns.

Stewart finished his Jaguars career rushing 765 times for 2,951 yards and 33 touchdowns. Stewart also played in six playoff games, including two AFC Championships, rushing 31 total times for 162 yards and two touchdowns.

=== Detroit Lions ===
Stewart became a free agent and signed with the Detroit Lions prior to the 2000 season. In his first year playing for the Lions, Stewart rushed for a career-high 1,184 yards and 10 touchdowns. In 2001, he rushed for 685 yards and one touchdown. During the 2002 season, he had another 1,000-plus yard season (1,021) and four touchdowns. He rushed for a career-high 172 yards in a 23-20 Week 7 victory over the Chicago Bears. He was, however, injured late in 2002 with a severe shoulder injury and did not play in 2003, ending his career. According to Coy Wire, Stewart's injury occurred because of a bounty system established by then Buffalo Bills head coach Gregg Williams. Wire stated: "I shattered James Stewart's shoulder and he never played again. I was showered with praise for that. It's a shame that's how it was. Now I see how wrong that was."

Stewart finished his time with the Lions rushing 713 times for 2,890 yards and 15 touchdowns. In his career, he rushed for a total of 1,478 times for 5,841 yards and 48 touchdowns.

== NFL career statistics ==
=== Regular season ===
Year	Team	Games		Rushing					Receiving					Fumbles	
Year	Team	GP	GS	Att	Yds	Avg	Lng	TD	Rec	Yds	Avg	Lng	TD	Fum	Lost
1995	JAX	14	8	137	525	3.8	22	2	21	190	9.0	38	1	1	1
1996	JAX	13	11	190	723	3.8	34	8	30	177	5.9	21	2	2	2
1997	JAX	16	5	136	555	4.1	33	8	41	336	8.2	40	1	0	0
1998	JAX	3	3	53	217	4.1	30	2	6	42	7.0	19	1	2	1
1999	JAX	14	7	249	931	3.7	44	13	21	108	5.1	19	0	4	3
2000	DET	16	16	339	1,184	3.5	34	10	32	287	9.0	32	1	4	2
2001	DET	11	10	143	685	4.8	38	1	23	242	10.5	56	1	0	0
2002	DET	14	9	231	1,021	4.4	56	4	46	333	7.2	52	2	0	0
Career		101	69	1478	5,841	4.0	56	48	220	1,715	7.8	56	9	13	9

=== Postseason ===
Year	Team	Games		Rushing					Receiving					Fumbles	
Year	Team	GP	GS	Att	Yds	Avg	Lng	TD	Rec	Yds	Avg	Lng	TD	Fum	Lost
1996	JAX	3	0	16	59	3.7	16	0	4	38	9.5	25	0	1	1
1997	JAX	1	0	1	6	6.0	6	0	3	46	15.3	26	0	0	0
1999	JAX	2	0	14	97	6.9	33	2	0	0	0.0	0	0	0	0
Career		6	0	31	162	5.2	33	2	7	84	12.0	26	0	1	1

=== Jaguars franchise records ===
- Most points scored in a game: 30
- Most rushing touchdowns in a game: 5

== Personal life ==
Stewart wore number 33 while playing for the University of Tennessee and the Jaguars. He wore number 34 while playing for the Lions.

He retired to Jacksonville and owns his own personal training studio called Studio 33.
