= Marcus Robinson (American football) =

American football player (born 1975)

No. 88, 87
- Position: Wide receiver

Personal information
- Born: February 27, 1975 (age 51); Fort Valley, Georgia, U.S.
- Listed height: 6 ft 3 in (1.91 m)
- Listed weight: 215 lb (98 kg)

Career information
- High school: Peach County (Fort Valley)
- College: South Carolina
- NFL draft: 1997: 4th round, 108th overall pick

Career history
- Chicago Bears (1997–2002); → Rhein Fire (1998); Baltimore Ravens (2003); Minnesota Vikings (2004–2006); Detroit Lions (2007)*
- * Offseason or practice squad member only

Awards and highlights
- World Bowl VI (1998); NFL Europe MVP (1998)

Career NFL statistics
- Receptions: 325
- Receiving yards: 4,699
- Receiving touchdowns: 43
- Stats at Pro Football Reference

Marcus Antonio Robinson (born February 27, 1975) is an American former professional football player in the National Football League (NFL), who played the position of wide receiver.

He played for the Chicago Bears, Baltimore Ravens, and Minnesota Vikings, as well as the Rhein Fire. He founded the Marcus Robinson Foundation for underprivileged children.

== Early life ==
Robinson was born in Fort Valley, Georgia and attended Peach County High School in Fort Valley, where he starred in football and track. In football, he won All-America and All-State honors as a wide receiver, free safety, and punter. In track, he won regional titles on the 100 and 200 meter dashes.

== College career ==
Robinson played wide receiver at the University of South Carolina.

== Professional career ==
Pre-draft measurables
Height	Weight	Arm length	Hand span	40-yard dash	10-yard split	20-yard split	Vertical jump	Broad jump
6 ft 3 3/8 in (1.91 m)	213 lb (97 kg)	34 1/8 in (0.87 m)	10 1/4 in (0.26 m)	4.45 s	1.60 s	2.65 s	37.0 in (0.94 m)	10 ft 0 in (3.05 m)
All values from NFL Combine

Robinson was selected by the Chicago Bears in the fourth round (108th overall) of the 1997 NFL draft. He missed his rookie season with a thumb injury. In 1998, Robinson played with the Rhein Fire of NFL Europe during the NFL the offseason. He led the NFL Europe league in receiving yards, won the season MVP award, and won the championship at World Bowl '98.

Robinson had a successful season in 1999 with the Bears, setting a team record with 1,400 receiving yards which stood until the record was broken by Brandon Marshall in 2012. Injuries forced him into a journeyman role for the rest of his career.

As a Baltimore Raven in 2003, Robinson caught four touchdown passes in an overtime win over the Seattle Seahawks. He was expected to be resigned, but the Ravens wanted their first star at wide receiver, so Robinson was let go as a free agent. He was the leading wide receiver for the Minnesota Vikings the previous three years before he was cut on Christmas Eve, 2006. The move came a day after the St. Paul Pioneer Press published an interview with Robinson in which he expressed displeasure with the Vikings' 6-9-1 record.

He signed a one-day contract with the Chicago Bears in June 2008, citing his desire to retire with the team that gave him his first chance in pro football. He officially retired on June 9, 2008.

== Life after the NFL ==
Robinson is currently working as a physical trainer for young athletes. He is also the sprint coach for the Marian Hurricanes track team in Woodstock, Illinois.

== Personal life ==
His nephew, Demarcus Robinson, is a wide receiver in the NFL and was selected in the fourth round of the 2016 NFL draft by the Kansas City Chiefs.

== Career stats ==
Year	Team	Rec	Yds	TD
1998	Chicago Bears	5	44	1
1999	Chicago Bears	84	1400	9
2000	Chicago Bears	55	738	5
2001	Chicago Bears	23	269	2
2002	Chicago Bears	21	244	3
2003	Baltimore Ravens	31	451	6
2004	Minnesota Vikings	47	657	8
2005	Minnesota Vikings	31	515	5
2006	Minnesota Vikings	29	381	4
		325	4699	43

== See also ==
- List of Chicago Bears players
