= John Allred (American football) =

American football player (born 1974)

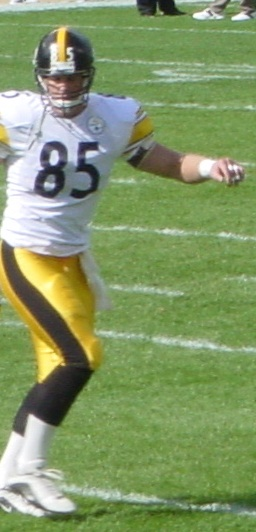
- Allred with the Pittsburgh Steelers in 2002

No. 84, 85
- Position: Tight end

Personal information
- Born: September 9, 1974 (age 52); Del Mar, California, U.S.
- Listed height: 6 ft 4 in (1.93 m)
- Listed weight: 249 lb (113 kg)

Career information
- High school: Torrey Pines (San Diego, California)
- College: USC
- NFL draft: 1997: 2nd round, 38th overall pick

Career history
- Chicago Bears (1997–2000); St. Louis Rams (2001)*; Pittsburgh Steelers (2002)
- * Offseason or practice squad member only

Awards and highlights
- Second-team All-Pac-10 (1996)

Career NFL statistics
- Receptions: 30
- Receiving yards: 281
- Receiving touchdowns: 2
- Stats at Pro Football Reference

John Charles Allred (born September 9, 1974) is an American former professional football player who was a tight end who played in the National Football League (NFL) from 1997 to 2002. He played college football for the USC Trojans. Allred was selected by the Chicago Bears in the second round of the 1997 NFL draft (38th overall), and also played for the Pittsburgh Steelers.

== Early life ==
Born in Del Mar, California, Allred graduated from Torrey Pines High School in 1992. As a high school senior Allred was the defensive player of the year in the Palomar League and a Los Angeles Times first-team tight end, and Torrey Pines was 9–3 in the 1991 season including an eight-game winning streak. Allred is now the receiver coach at San Clemente High School.

== College career ==
He played college football at the University of Southern California from 1993 to 1996 after redshirting 1992. At USC, Allred majored in history. In 1993 and 1994, Allred played on special teams. He caught 6 passes for 70 yards in 1995. In his senior season, Allred became the starting tight end.

== Professional career ==
Allred played for the Chicago Bears between 1997 and 2000 and for the Pittsburgh Steelers in 2002.

== Personal ==
Allred's older sister, Linda, is married to the NFL's John Lynch.
