= Larry Nemmers =

American football official (born 1943)

- Born: July 12, 1943 (age 81); Waterloo, Iowa, U.S.
- Education: East Texas State University (Master's degree); Upper Iowa University (Bachelor's degree, 1965)
- Occupation: NFL official (1985–2007)

Larry Nemmers (born July 12, 1943) is a retired educator and better known as a former American football official in the National Football League (NFL). Nemmers made his debut as an NFL official in the 1985 season and continued in this role until the end of the 2007 season. Prior to his officiating career, he was a college football player at Upper Iowa University. Nemmers officiated at Super Bowl XXV, as well as several playoff games.

== Personal ==
=== Early years ===
Larry Nemmers, the eldest of nine children, is a native of Waterloo, Iowa and a 1960 graduate of Columbus High School in Waterloo. There he was a good friend of future professional baseball player, Virg Erickson. He later attended Upper Iowa University in Fayette, Iowa, graduating in 1965 with a bachelor's degree in biology. Nemmers also has master's degrees in physics and chemistry, which he received at East Texas State University in Commerce, Texas and in educational administration from Northern Illinois University in DeKalb, Illinois.

=== Family ===
He and his wife, Sherry, reside in Springfield, Missouri. He has three sons, Shane, Lance, and Brett, from a previous marriage as well as four grandchildren.

=== Education career ===
Nemmers' career in education began in 1965 and retired in 1994. During his time as an educator, he served as a teacher, textbook publisher, assistant principal, and principal. Since his retirement from education, Nemmers has traveled across the country as a motivational speaker. He was principal of Elgin High School in Elgin, IL from 1982 to 1994.

== Officiating career ==
=== Early years ===
As an educator, Nemmers also began his career in officiating. He officiated both high school football and basketball for 18 years and was selected to officiate in four state final championships. Nemmers also served as the Illinois High School rules interpreter for 15 years.

Nemmers moved up to college officiating in 1975 and worked in the Big Ten Conference for nine years, working both football and basketball games. During his college football officiating career, Nemmers officiated in the 1984 Rose Bowl.

=== NFL career ===
Nemmers began his NFL officiating career in 1985 as a side judge, and was assigned Super Bowl XXV in 1991, his final game at that position before being promoted to referee for the start of the 1991 NFL season after Jerry Seeman and Jim Tunney announced their retirements. As a referee, he was an alternate for Super Bowl XXXV in 2001. He wore uniform number 20 throughout his entire NFL officiating career.

==== Memorable games ====
Nemmers has officiated games which involved a player breaking a statistical record. He was the referee in the January 6, 2002, game that saw Dallas Cowboys running back Emmitt Smith accumulate 1,000 yards rushing in 11 consecutive seasons, breaking a record shared with Detroit Lions running back Barry Sanders.

In another memorable moment, he was the referee in the November 27, 2005, game that saw New York Giants punter Jeff Feagles set the NFL record for consecutive games with 283, breaking the record held by Minnesota Vikings defensive end Jim Marshall.
