= Backyard Bowl =

Jenks–Union football rivalry
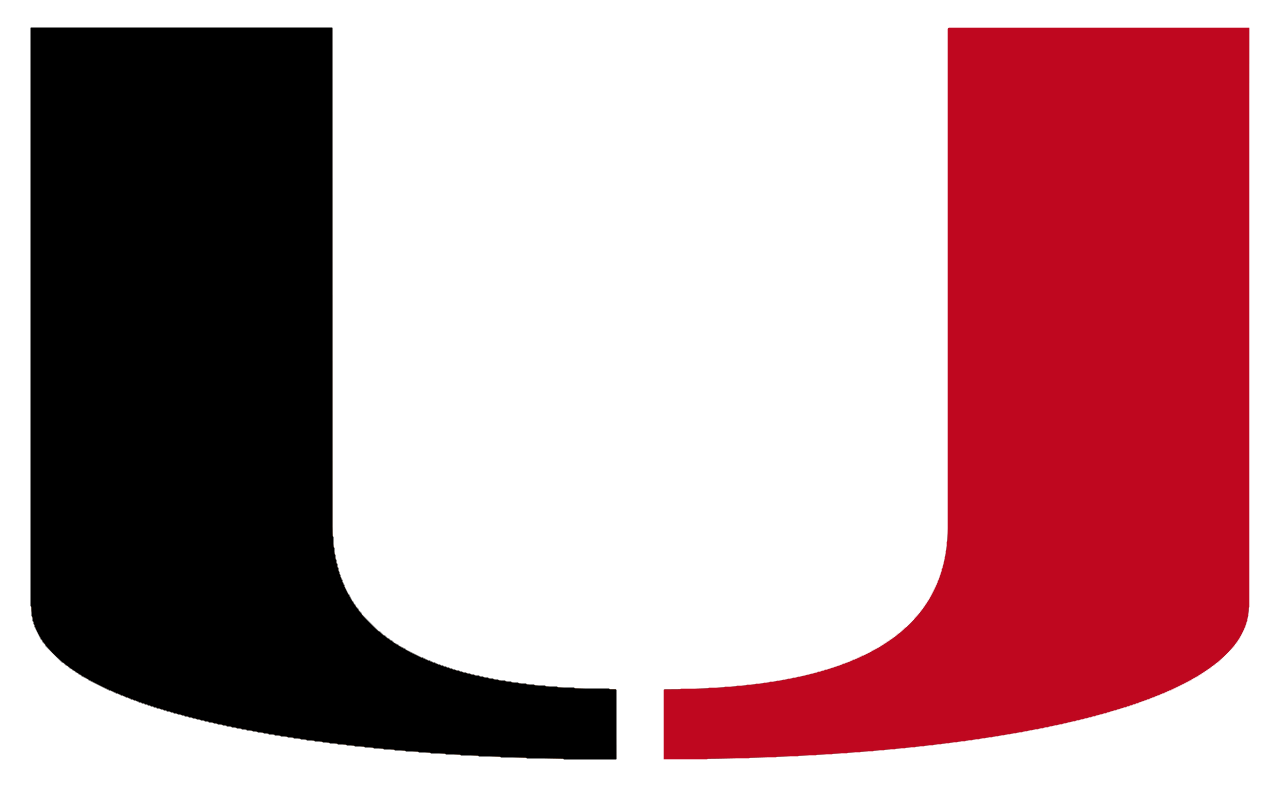
- Union Redhawks
- Other names: Backyard Bowl
- Sport: American High School football
- Teams: Jenks Trojans; Union Redhawks
- First meeting: October 26, 1923; Tie game; score missing
- Latest meeting: November 12, 2025; Jenks 48, Union 30
- Next meeting: 2026
- Stadiums: Allan Trimble Stadium, Union Tuttle Stadium, Skelly Field at H. A. Chapman Stadium
- Trophy: Backyard Bowl Trophy

Statistics
- Total meetings: 73
- All-time series: Jenks leads, 47-25-1
- Largest victory: Jenks, 48–3 (1980)
- Longest win streak: Jenks, 9 (1949–1980)
- Current win streak: Jenks, 2 (2024-present)

The Jenks–Union football rivalry, is an American high school football rivalry game played annually between the Trojans of Jenks High School and Union High School in Tulsa.

== History ==
The Backyard Bowl regular season football games are usually played at Skelly Field at H. A. Chapman Stadium at the University of Tulsa. Known as the "Backyard Bowl," the rivalry has received coverage by Sporting News and is the subject of a Versus documentary produced by NFL Films. The annual game is played at the University of Tulsa and has drawn crowds of over 40,000. The annual rivalry game was presented on the Great American Rivalry Series internet broadcast in 2007. One of these two teams won Oklahoma's Class 6A (large school) title every year from 1996 to 2016.

== Notable games ==
=== 1999 ===
Class 6A State Championship: Jenks 14 – Union 7

The 1999 Class 6A State Championship featured archrivals Jenks against Union, in the regular-season game, Union was victorious by a score of 27–24 in overtime. The game was the second championship tilt between the Trojan and Redskins. In 1998, Jenks beat Union 41–38. In front of a record-setting crowd of 40,385 for Oklahoma high school football, Jenks was victorious by a score of 14–7, winning their four consecutive and seventh overall State championship.

== Game results ==
Jenks victories	Union victories	Tie games

No.	Date	Location	Winner	Score
1	October 26, 1923		Tie	–––
2	September 16, 1949		Jenks	33–6
3	September 15, 1950		Jenks	25–6
4	September 21, 1951		Jenks	33–6
5	September 18, 1952		Jenks	13–0
6	September 17, 1976		Jenks	41–6
7	September 16, 1977		Jenks	27–7
8	November 3, 1978		Jenks	40–7
9	November 2, 1979		Jenks	3–0
10	October 10, 1980		Jenks	48–3
11	October 8, 1981		Union	10–7
12	September 24, 1982		Jenks	10–6
13	September 23, 1983		Union	13–3
14	October 12, 1984		Union	17–0
15	October 11, 1985		Union	17–12
16	October 31, 1986		Jenks	20–7
17	October 30, 1987		Jenks	31–6
18	October 28, 1988		Union	6–3
19	October 27, 1989		Jenks	16–12
20	October 26, 1990		Jenks	14–8
21	November 1, 1991		Union	21–13
22	September 25, 1992		Jenks	14–11
23	September 24, 1993		Jenks	31–23
24	October 7, 1994		Jenks	37–30
25	October 6, 1995		Jenks	28–7
26	October 17, 1996	Jenks	Jenks	42–14
27	October 16, 1997	Union	Jenks	21–11
28	September 18, 1998	Jenks	Union	55–45
29	December 4, 1998	Stillwater	Jenks	41–28
30	September 17, 1999	Union	Union	27 ^{OT}–24
31	December 3, 1999	Tulsa	Jenks	14–7
32	September 14, 2000	Tulsa	Jenks	41–37
33	December 1, 2000	Tulsa	Jenks	31–12
34	September 13, 2002	Tulsa	Union	33–0
35	September 12, 2003	Tulsa	Union	37–12
36	November 29, 2003	Tulsa	Jenks	14–12
37	September 9, 2004	Tulsa	Jenks	17–13
38	December 2, 2004	Tulsa	Union	27–17

No.	Date	Location	Winner	Score
39	September 8, 2005	Tulsa	Jenks	48–44
40	September 8, 2006	Tulsa	Jenks	9–6
41	September 7, 2007	Tulsa	Union	43 ^{OT}–42
42	November 30, 2007	Tulsa	Jenks	42–24
43	September 12, 2008	Tulsa	Union	24–17
44	December 5, 2008	Stillwater	Union	34 ^{OT}–20
45	September 11, 2009	Tulsa	Jenks	27–25
46	December 4, 2009	Tulsa	Union	52–19
47	September 10, 2010	Tulsa	Jenks	33–7
48	December 3, 2010	Stillwater	Union	50–47
49	September 9, 2011	Tulsa	Union	41–19
50	November 25, 2011	Stillwater	Union	30–29
51	August 31, 2012	Tulsa	Union	14–7
52	November 23, 2012	Broken Arrow	Jenks	41–10
53	September 13, 2013	Tulsa	Jenks	20–16
54	December 12, 2013	Tulsa	Jenks	38–22
55	September 12, 2014	Tulsa	Union	24–13
56	December 5, 2014	Tulsa	Jenks	21–14
57	September 11, 2015	Tulsa	Jenks	45–27
58	November 20, 2015	Owasso	Jenks	33–17
59	September 9, 2016	Tulsa	Jenks	35–28
60	November 18, 2016	Owasso	Union	45–21
61	September 7, 2017	Tulsa	Union	59–40
62	September 7, 2018	Tulsa	Jenks	27–10
63	November 17, 2018	Tulsa	Jenks	27–24
64	September 13, 2019	Tulsa	Union	35–20
65	September 11, 2020	Jenks	Jenks	28–0
66	September 10, 2021	Tulsa	Jenks	22–0
67	December 4, 2021	Edmond (state championship)	Jenks	30–15
68	September 9, 2022	Union	Union	38–3
69	September 8, 2023	Jenks	Jenks	31–24
70	November 24, 2023	Sand Springs	Jenks	33–27
71	September 13, 2024	Union	Union	9–3
72	November 22, 2024	Jenks	Jenks	42–7
73	September 12, 2025	Jenks	Jenks	48–30
Series: Jenks leads 47–25–1
Note, the 1923 game score is missing; tie game.

== Notable alumni ==
=== Jenks ===
- Chase Beeler, former center for the San Francisco 49ers and Philadelphia Eagles
- Corey Callens, former DE for the Baltimore Ravens, Carolina Panthers, Rhein Fire, Miami Dolphins, and Austin Wranglers
- Rocky Calmus, former Linebacker for the Tennessee Titans (2002–2004)
- Phillip Dillard, former LB for the New York Giants, Carolina Panthers, Omaha Nighthawks, and San Diego Chargers
- Jake Laptad, former DE for the Chicago Bears
- Sean Mahan, former NFL center for the Tampa Bay Buccaneers
- Garrett Mills, former TE for the New England Patriots, Minnesota Vikings, Philadelphia Eagles, and Cincinnati Bengals
- Anthony Phillips, former DE for the Chicago Bears
- Lawrence Pinson, former LB for the Arizona Cardinals, Amsterdam Admirals, and New York Jets
- Brian Presley is an American actor
- Sean Wells, former lineman for the Houston Oilers
- Jerry Wisne, former OT for the Chicago Bears, Minnesota Vikings, St. Louis Rams, and Green Bay Packers
- Steven Parker, Defensive Back for the Dallas Cowboys
- Dillon Stoner, Wide Receiver for the Oakland Raiders
- Tyler Ott, Longsnapper for the Seattle Seahawks
- Darwin Thompson, Runningback for the Tampa Bay Buccaneers

=== Union ===
- Justin Fuente, former Oklahoma Sooners quarterback and head football coach for Virginia Tech
- Jeff Leiding, football linebacker for the Indianapolis Colts, 1986–1987
- Steve Logan, former East Carolina head football coach 1992–2002 and Boston College offensive coordinator 2007–2009 (Assistant coach at Union High, 1974–79).
- Dominique Franks, football cornerback for the Atlanta Falcons, 2010–present
- Tress Way, football punter for the Washington Redskins, 2013–present
