= 1999 Chicago Bears season =

NFL team season

- Owner: Virginia Halas McCaskey
- Head coach: Dick Jauron
- Offensive coordinator: Gary Crowton
- Defensive coordinator: Greg Blache
- Home stadium: Soldier Field

Results
- Record: 6–10
- Division place: 5th NFC Central
- Playoffs: Did not qualify

The 1999 season was the Chicago Bears' 80th in the National Football League (NFL). On January 24, Dick Jauron was named head coach. The team improved on their 4–12 from 1998, finishing with a 6–10 under Jauron, who replaced Dave Wannstedt.

Quarterbacks Shane Matthews (1,645), Cade McNown (1,465) and Jim Miller (1,242) combined for 4,352 passing yards during the season, the most in franchise history.

== Offseason ==
Additions	Subtractions
T Blake Brockermeyer (Panthers)	QB Erik Kramer (Chargers)
DT Shane Burton (Dolphins)	T Andy Heck (Redskins)
S Chris Hudson (Jaguars)	
QB Shane Matthews (Panthers)	

=== Organizational changes ===
Head coach Dave Wannstedt was fired after the 1998 season, forcing the Bears to hire their second head coach in ten years. The candidates included offensive coordinators Sherman Lewis of the Green Bay Packers and Joe Pendry of the Buffalo Bills, defensive coordinators Dave McGinnis (Arizona Cardinals), Dick Jauron (Jacksonville Jaguars) and Gunther Cunningham (Kansas City Chiefs), while DC Jim Haslett (Pittsburgh Steelers) was interviewed. Minnesota Vikings OC Brian Billick and New York Jets DC Bill Belichick were also allowed to be interviewed by the team. McGinnis was considered the favorite, and was interviewed last; he would be approached by Bears president Michael McCaskey for contractual terms, with McGinnis stating he "needed some time and he would think about it." However, the next day, McCaskey scheduled a press conference to announce McGinnis as the head coach, despite not having been officially hired. As a result, the conference was canceled, and Jauron would instead be hired, while McCaskey would be replaced by Ted Phillips.

=== 1999 expansion draft ===
Bears selected during the expansion draft
Pick	Name	Position	Expansion team
15	Marlon Forbes	Safety	Cleveland Browns

=== NFL draft ===
1999 Chicago Bears draft
Round	Pick	Player	Position	College	Notes
1	12	Cade McNown	Quarterback	UCLA	
2	48	Russell Davis	Defensive tackle	North Carolina	
3	66	Rex Tucker	Guard	Texas A&M	
3	71	D'Wayne Bates	Wide receiver	Northwestern	
3	78	Marty Booker *	Wide receiver	Northeast Louisiana	
4	106	Warrick Holdman	Linebacker	Texas A&M	
4	111	Rosevelt Colvin	Linebacker	Purdue	
5	143	Jerry Wisne	Offensive tackle	Notre Dame	
5	144	Khari Samuel	Linebacker	Massachusetts	
5	147	Jerry Azumah *	Running back	New Hampshire	
6	184	Rashard Cook	Defensive back	USC	
7	221	Sulecio Sanford	Wide receiver	Middle Tennessee State	
7	253	Jim Finn	Fullback	Pennsylvania	
Made roster * Made at least one Pro Bowl during career

== Staff ==
1999 Chicago Bears staff
Front office: Chairman emeritus – Ed McCaskey; Chairman of the board – Michael McCaskey; Secretary – Virginia Halas McCaskey; President and CEO – Ted Phillips; Vice president of player personnel – Mark Hatley; Director of college scouting – Bill Rees; Director of pro personnel – Rick Spielman; Head coaches: Head coach – Dick Jauron; Offensive coaches: Offensive coordinator – Gary Crowton; Quarterbacks – John Shoop; Running backs – Earle Mosley; Wide receivers – Mike Borich; Tight ends – Jim Bollman; Offensive line – Bob Wylie; Offensive quality control – Eric Studesville	Defensive coaches: Defensive coordinator – Greg Blache; Defensive line – Rex Norris; Linebackers – Dale Lindsey; Defensive backs – Vance Bedford; Defensive quality control – Chuck Bullough; Special teams coaches: Special teams – Keith Armstrong; Strength and conditioning: Physical development coordinator – Russ Riederer; Assistant physical development coordinator – Steve Little

== Roster ==
1999 Chicago Bears roster
Quarterbacks (QB): 19 Craig Erickson; 9 Shane Matthews; 8 Cade McNown; Running backs (RB): 20 James Allen; 32 Edgar Bennett; 49 Ty Hallock FB; 24 Glyn Milburn; Wide receivers (WR): 87 D'Wayne Bates; 86 Marty Booker; 81 Bobby Engram; 88 Marcus Robinson; 82 Sulecio Sanford; Tight ends (TE): 84 John Allred; 85 Alonzo Mayes; 89 Ryan Wetnight	Offensive linemen (OL): 78 Blake Brockermeyer T; 68 Keno Hills G/T; 67 Greg Huntington C/G; 57 Olin Kreutz C; 73 Dan Palmer T; 75 Todd Perry G; 64 Rex Tucker G; 58 Chris Villarrial G; 60 Casey Wiegmann C; 71 James Williams T; 79 Jerry Wisne T; Defensive linemen (DL): 70 Ken Anderson DT; 94 Shane Burton DT; 95 Russell Davis DE; 99 Jim Flanigan DT; 98 Bryan Robinson DE; 96 Clyde Simmons DE; 90 Van Tuinei DE; 97 Mike Wells DT	Linebackers (LB): 52 Keith Burns MLB; 59 Rosevelt Colvin OLB; 55 Sean Harris MLB; 53 Warrick Holdman OLB; 54 Ricardo McDonald OLB; 92 Barry Minter; 91 Khari Samuel MLB; Defensive backs (DB): 36 Ray Austin SS; 23 Jerry Azumah CB; 21 Terry Cousin CB; 27 Walt Harris CB; 47 Chris Hudson FS; 26 Jermaine Jones CB; 37 Tony Parrish SS; 29 Frankie Smith CB/S; 25 Cordell Taylor CB; Special teams (ST): 10 Jaret Holmes K; 65 Patrick Mannelly LS; 16 Todd Sauerbrun P	Practice squad: 45 Scott Dragos TE; 39 Jim Finn FB; 31 Zebbie Lethridge CB; 17 Chad Mackey WR; 62 Ron Warner DE; Reserve: -- Dorian Brew CB (IR); 83 Macey Brooks WR (IR); 80 Curtis Conway WR (IR); 44 Curtis Enis RB (IR); 74 Jimmy Herndon T (IR); 1 Jeff Jaeger K (IR); 15 Jim Miller QB (Susp.); 69 Chad Overhauser T (IR); Rookies in italics 53 active, 8 reserve, 5 practice squad

== Regular season ==
=== Schedule ===
Week	Date	Opponent	Result	Record	Venue	Attendance
1	September 12	Kansas City Chiefs	W 20–17	1–0	Soldier Field	58,381
2	September 19	Seattle Seahawks	L 13–14	1–1	Solder Field	66,944
3	September 26	at Oakland Raiders	L 17–24	1–2	Oakland–Alameda County Coliseum	50,458
4	October 3	New Orleans Saints	W 14–10	2–2	Soldier Field	66,944
5	October 10	at Minnesota Vikings	W 24–22	3–2	Hubert H. Humphrey Metrodome	64,107
6	October 17	Philadelphia Eagles	L 16–20	3–3	Soldier Field	66,944
7	October 24	at Tampa Bay Buccaneers	L 3–6	3–4	Raymond James Stadium	65,283
8	October 31	at Washington Redskins	L 22–48	3–5	FedEx Field	77,621
9	November 7	at Green Bay Packers	W 14–13	4–5	Lambeau Field	59,867
10	November 14	Minnesota Vikings	L 24–27 (OT)	4–6	Soldier Field	61,481
11	November 21	at San Diego Chargers	W 23–20 (OT)	5–6	Qualcomm Stadium	56,055
12	November 25	at Detroit Lions	L 17–21	5–7	Pontiac Silverdome	77,905
13	December 5	Green Bay Packers	L 19–35	5–8	Soldier Field	66,944
14	Bye					
15	December 19	Detroit Lions	W 28–10	6–8	Soldier Field	50,256
16	December 26	at St. Louis Rams	L 12–34	6–9	Trans World Dome	65,941
17	January 2	Tampa Bay Buccaneers	L 6–20	6–10	Soldier Field	66,945

=== Game summaries ===
==== Week 1: vs Kansas City Chiefs ====
Week 1: Kansas City Chiefs at Chicago Bears – Game summary

Quarter	1	2	3	4	Total
Chiefs	3	0	7	7	17
Bears	7	13	0	0	20

at Soldier Field, Chicago, Illinois

- Date: September 12
- Game time: 12:00 p.m. CDT
- Game weather: Partly cloudy, 80 °F (27 °C)
- Game attendance: 58,381
- Referee: Phil Luckett
- TV announcers (CBS): Kevin Harlan and Sam Wyche
- Recap, Game Book

Game information

First quarter

- KC – Pete Stoyanovich 27-yard field goal, 9:14. Chiefs 3–0. Drive: 11 plays, 69 yards, 5:46.
- CHI – Curtis Enis 10-yard pass from Shane Matthews (Brian Gowins kick), 4:32. Bears 7–3. Drive: 11 plays, 61 yards, 5:42.

Second quarter

- CHI – Brian Gowins 21-yard field goal, 12:45. Bears 10–3. Drive: 6 plays, 26 yards, 2:15.
- CHI – Brian Gowins 24-yard field goal, 3:49. Bears 13–3. Drive: 14 plays, 74 yards, 6:01.
- CHI – John Allred 1-yard pass from Shane Matthews (Brian Gowins kick), 0:51. Bears 20–3. Drive: 6 plays, 63 yards, 1:27.

Third quarter

- KC – Derrick Alexander 86-yard pass from Elvis Grbac (Pete Stoyanovich kick), 5:01. Bears 20–10. Drive: 1 play, 86 yards, 0:12.

Fourth quarter

- KC – Donnie Edwards 79-yard fumble return (Pete Stoyanovich kick), 12:24. Bears 20–17.

Top passers

- KC – Elvis Grbac – 20/42, 283 yards, TD, INT
- CHI – Shane Matthews – 25/38, 245 yards, 2 TD

Top rushers

- KC – Kimble Anders – 10 rushes, 39 yards
- CHI – Curtis Enis – 22 rushes, 64 yards

Top receivers

- KC – Derrick Alexander – 6 receptions, 154 yards, TD
- CHI – Curtis Conway – 9 receptions, 88 yards

==== Week 2: vs Seattle Seahawks ====
Week Two: Seattle Seahawks at Chicago Bears – Game summary

Quarter	1	2	3	4	Total
Seahawks	0	0	0	14	14
Bears	0	10	3	0	13

at Soldier Field, Chicago, Illinois

- Date: September 19, 1999
- Game time: 12:03 pm local
- Game weather: clear, 76 °F (24 °C), 34% humidity, wind SW 15 miles per hour (24 km/h)
- Game attendance: 66,944
- Referee: Mike Carey
- TV announcers (CBS): Kevin Harlan and Sam Wyche
- Gamebook

Game information

First quarter

  - No scoring plays

Second quarter

- CHI – Curtis Enis 2-yard run (Brian Gowins kick), 10:20 (CHI 7–0)
- CHI – Brian Gowins 29-yard field goal, 3:27 (CHI 10–0)

Third quarter

- CHI – Brian Gowins 43-yard field goal, 2:07 (CHI 13–0)

Fourth quarter

- SEA – Derrick Mayes 34-yard pass from Glenn Foley (Todd Peterson kick), 13:04 (CHI 13–7)
- SEA – Fabien Bownes 49-yard pass from Glenn Foley (Todd Peterson kick), 7:51 (SEA 14–13)

Top passers

- SEA – Glenn Foley: 18/30, 283 yds, 2 TD
- CHI – Shane Matthews: 22/42, 212 yds

Top rushers

- SEA – Ricky Watters: 23 car, 99 yds
- CHI – Curtis Enis: 25 car, 94 yds, 1 TD

Top receivers

- SEA – Derrick Mayes: 7 rec, 137 yds, 1 TD
- CHI – Marcus Robinson: 3 rec, 42 yds

Team – pass – rush – total – to

- SEA – 249 – 100 – 349 – 3
- CHI – 196 – 115 – 311 – 1

==== Week 9: at Green Bay Packers ====
Week 9: Chicago Bears at Green Bay Packers

Quarter	1	2	3	4	Total
Bears	7	0	7	0	14
Packers	3	7	0	3	13

at Lambeau Field, Green Bay, Wisconsin

- Date: November 7, 1999
- Game time: 3:03 p.m. CST
- Game weather: Overcast, 51 °F (11 °C)
- Game attendance: 59,867
- Referee: Mike Carey
- TV announcers (Fox): Pat Summerall and John Madden

Game information

First quarter

Second quarter

Third quarter

Fourth quarter

Top passers

- CHI – Jim Miller – 16/29, 142 yards, 1 TD, 3 int
- GB – Brett Favre – 27/40, 267 yards, 1 TD, 1 int

Top rushers

- CHI – Curtis Enis – 20 rushes, 88 yards
- GB – Dorsey Levens – 26 rushes, 79 yards

Top receivers

- CHI – Marcus Robinson – 4 receptions, 66 yards
- GB – Bill Schroeder – 4 receptions, 57 yards

==== Week 10: vs Minnesota Vikings ====
Week 10: Minnesota Vikings at Chicago Bears

Quarter	1	2	3	4	OT	Total
Vikings	7	7	3	7	3	27
Bears	14	3	0	7	0	24

at Soldier Field, Chicago, Illinois

- Date: November 14
- Game time: 12:00 p.m. CST
- Game weather: Mostly sunny, 50 °F (10 °C)
- Game attendance: 66,944
- Referee: Bill Carollo (63)
- TV announcers (FOX): Dick Stockton, Matt Millen, Pam Oliver
- Recap, Game Book

Game information

First quarter

- CHI – Marcus Robinson 77-yard pass from Jim Miller (Chris Boniol kick), 9:43. Bears 7–0. Drive: 1 play, 72 yards, 0:10.
- MIN – Cris Carter 21-yard pass from Jeff George (Gary Anderson kick), 6:41. Tied 7–7. Drive: 5 plays, 66 yards, 3:02.
- CHI – Marty Booker 57-yard pass from Jim Miller (Chris Boniol kick), 4:04. Bears 14–7. Drive: 5 plays, 89 yards, 2:37.

Second quarter

- MIN – Cris Carter 7-yard pass from Jeff George (Gary Anderson kick), 5:58. Tied 14–14. Drive: 1 play, 7 yards, 0:06.
- CHI – Chris Boniol 34-yard field goal, 1:07. Bears 17–14. Drive: 11 plays, 69 yards, 4:51.

Third quarter

- MIN – Gary Anderson 38-yard field goal, 4:55. Tied 17–17. Drive: 7 plays, 25 yards, 3:32.

Fourth quarter

- MIN – Cris Carter 1-yard pass from Jeff George (Gary Anderson kick), 6:06. Vikings 24–17. Drive: 13 plays, 96 yards, 6:42.
- CHI – Marty Booker 25-yard pass from Jim Miller (Chris Boniol kick), 0:49. Tied 24–24. Drive: 9 plays, 87 yards, 2:36.

Overtime

- MIN – Gary Anderson 38-yard field goal, 0:00. Vikings 27–24. Drive: 10 plays, 49 yards, 12:58.

Top passers

- MIN – Jeff George – 25/44, 374 yards, 3 TD, INT
- CHI – Jim Miller – 34/48, 422 yards, 3 TD, INT

Top rushers

- MIN – Robert Smith – 20 rushes, 83 yards
- CHI – Curtis Enis – 19 rushes, 54 yards

Top receivers

- MIN – Randy Moss – 12 receptions, 204 yards
- CHI – Marcus Robinson – 7 receptions, 148 yards, TD

== Standings ==
NFC Central
	W	L	T	PCT	PF	PA	STK
^{(2)} Tampa Bay Buccaneers	11	5	0	.688	270	235	W2
^{(4)} Minnesota Vikings	10	6	0	.625	399	335	W3
^{(6)} Detroit Lions	8	8	0	.500	322	323	L4
Green Bay Packers	8	8	0	.500	357	341	W1
Chicago Bears	6	10	0	.375	272	341	L2
