= Darcy Taylor =

American softball player (born 1993)

Personal information
- Born: October 12, 1993 (age 32) Tucson, Arizona, U.S.
- Height: 6 ft 0 in (1.83 m)

Sport
- Country: USA
- Sport: Softball
- College team: Oklahoma State Cowgirls; Arizona Wildcats

Darcy Lyndon Taylor (born October 12, 1993) is an American softball player. She attended Jenks High School in Jenks, Oklahoma. She later attended the University of Arizona for one year, before transferring to Oklahoma State University–Stillwater. At both universities, she played on the school's respective college softball teams. In her senior year, Taylor led Oklahoma State softball to a berth in the 2016 NCAA Division I softball tournament regional finals, where they lost to Georgia, 6–0.
