= Allan Trimble =

High school football coach

Biographical details
- Born: August 14, 1963; Pawnee, Oklahoma
- Died: December 1, 2019 (aged 56)
- Education: Cleveland High School, Northeastern State

Coaching career (HC unless noted)
- 1987-1990: Owasso High School
- 1990-1993: Jenks High School (Assistant)
- 1993-1996: Jenks High School (OC)
- 1996-2018: Jenks High School

Head coaching record
- Overall: 252-43

Accomplishments and honors

Championships
- 1993, 1996–2001, 2003, 2006, 2007, 2012–2015

Awards
- NFHS Hall of Famer

Allan Trimble (August 14, 1963 – December 1, 2019) was an American high school football coach for the Jenks Trojans in Jenks, Oklahoma. As coach of the football program, he led the team for 22 seasons, winning 13 Oklahoma state championships, with a total record of 252-43 between 1996 and 2018.

Trimble is an inductee to the national High School Football Hall of Fame, as well as the Oklahoma Sports and Coaches Association Halls of Fame.

He played high school football for Cleveland High School and played collegiate football at Northeastern State University.
