= Theodore S. Westhusing =

United States Army officer

Col Theodore S. Westhusing Ph.D.
- Born: November 17, 1960; Dallas, Texas
- Died: June 5, 2005 (aged 44) near Baghdad, Iraq
- Military career
- Allegiance: United States of America
- Branch: United States Army
- Service years: 1983–2005
- Rank: Colonel
- Nickname: Ted
- Conflicts: War in Iraq

Colonel Theodore Scott Westhusing (November 17, 1960 – June 5, 2005), a West Point professor of English and Philosophy, volunteered to serve in Iraq in late 2004 and died in Baghdad in June 2005 from an allegedly self-inflicted gunshot wound. At the time, he was the highest-ranked American to die violently in Iraq since the start of the March 2003 United States-led invasion. He was 44 years old, married with three young children.

== Early life and career ==
Westhusing was born in Dallas, Texas and attended high school at Jenks High School in Jenks, Oklahoma, a suburb of Tulsa, where he was a student and starter for the basketball team, graduating in 1979. He attended West Point, where in his senior year he was selected as honor captain (the highest-ranking ethics official within the cadet corps) and graduated third in his class with a B.S. degree in 1983. He served in the 82nd Airborne Division, graduated from Ranger School, missed the first Gulf War while working on a master's degree, was deployed to Kosovo and Korea, and eventually became a professor at West Point. In 2003, he wrote a dissertation in philosophy at Emory University in Atlanta, "The competitive and cooperative aretai within the American warfighting ethos". The dissertation explores "an ideal functional description of the American warrior [which] makes heavy demands of the warrior's entire being in supporting and defending the United States Constitution to which he has sworn his allegiance." He held degrees and majored in Russian, Philosophy and Military Strategy.

== Iraq deployment ==
Westhusing served with what the U.S. Department of Defense called the "Multi-national Security Transition Command - Iraq". His primary duty was to oversee the training of Iraqis for civilian police duty, in collaboration with USIS, a private military company. In mid-May 2005 he received an anonymous letter alleging fraud, waste and abuse by USIS. He also witnessed many of the following charges as well. The accusations included the following: forged employees' résumés claiming elite forces background, inadequate skills and competence of trainers, insufficient numbers of trainers in order to maximize profits, disappearance of large quantities of weapons, radios, and other equipment, and employees boasting of killing Iraqis.

Although Westhusing initially wrote to his commanders only seven days before his death that the allegations in the letter were false, many have determined that he was forced to write to his commanding officers, General Petraeus and General Fil, in order to keep his position and his commanding officers and USIS's cover on their activities, or perhaps until he could get the information to a source that would not cover up the illegalities. According to documentation, Colonel Westhusing then decided to go forward with the allegations about the illegalities to his commanders and the management of USIS, feeling that his life was now threatened and that he needed to get the information to outside sources before something happened to him. He did this regardless of the consequences to himself, to confront the injustices and to have the allegations exposed. He had also planned on returning to the U.S. to bring these allegations forward, but now feared for his life. This decision led to a subsequent, final confrontation and to his death. There is evidence that something happened in those remaining seven days that caused him to turn angrily upon the management of USIS because of threats, referring to them with intense disgust as "money grubbing" and to their participation in illegal activities with members of the Iraqi police and others.

According to various Inspector General Investigation Reports, on the afternoon of Jun 5, he met with BMP, who ran the second training activity under his command known as the Iraq National Police Counter Insurgency Force training team located at An’Numinayah 200 km South West of Baghdad.

BMP had driven to Baghdad earlier that day at Colonel Westhusing’s request. BMP’s program was regarded highly as Partner Force training, mentoring and complete program operations including life support and force protection within Iraq. By completion in 2007 they had trained 22,500 personnel and established 10 Brigades.

The meeting involved him describing the situation at Camp Dublin and it seems he was seeking some form of comment. It is well documented that BMP advised him strongly, not to go. It seems BMP suggested his organisation take Colonel Westhusing to Camp Dublin and provide PSD. The meeting went on for some time with BMP leaving thinking Colonel Westhusing would contact him if he intended going to Dublin.

BMP ascertained later that he had driven to Dublin and BMP used various means to contact him to no success, finally deploying with two vehicles, 4 Expats and 4 Kurdish operators forward to Check Point 1 on Route Irish. BMP and his team stayed in place throughout the night until contacted and advised the Colonel had committed suicide and US Forces from Counter Terrorism Special Operations had deployed to Dublin)

His anger soon extended to his own commanders for taking no action on his recommendations to bring honesty and efficiency to the Army's training of Iraqis, with particular reference to USIS' role in that training and many illegal activities within the Iraqi Army and police. These commanders included the current Commander of Multinational Force - Iraq, 4-star General David Petraeus (then a 3-star General in charge of U.S. operations in northern Iraq).

Colonel Westhusing died at Camp Dublin outside Baghdad, Iraq in June 2005, leaving a note saying, “I cannot support a mission that leads to corruption, human rights abuses and liars.”

Westhusing, who was left-handed, was found in his trailer with a gunshot wound behind his left ear from his own 9mm Beretta service pistol on June 5, 2005, a month and three days before his tour of duty was to end. He had had a heated and confrontational meeting with General Petraeus that morning concerning these issues with USIS. A DOD Army report also stated that an administrator near his trailer had heard a very loud argument in Colonel Westhusing's office trailer before he was found dead by the contractor. Approximately an hour after this argument and the earlier meeting with Generals Petraeus the USIS contractors that morning, he was found by a USIS contractor who then altered the death scene before reporting it. A note was found at his side in which he wrote, in addition to a short explanation, "I am sullied - no more". Three of the seven numbered pages of the document by his side were not disclosed in the investigation. This note was part of a journal he was keeping to document these issues. Other pages were excluded from the Army's final report because of what was considered sensitive government issues.

His suicide note to his commanding officer, General Petraeus, featured in an article by Robert Bryce published in the Texas Observer on March 8, 2007, read:

Thanks for telling me it was a good day until I briefed you. [Redacted name]—You are only interested in your career and provide no support to your staff—no msn [mission] support and you don’t care. I cannot support a msn that leads to corruption, human right abuses and liars. I am sullied—no more. I didn’t volunteer to support corrupt, money grubbing contractors, nor work for commanders only interested in themselves. I came to serve honorably and feel dishonored. I trust no Iraqi. I cannot live this way. All my love to my family, my wife and my precious children. I love you and trust you only. Death before being dishonored any more. Trust is essential—I don’t know who trust anymore. [sic] Why serve when you cannot accomplish the mission, when you no longer believe in the cause, when your every effort and breath to succeed meets with lies, lack of support, and selfishness? No more. Reevaluate yourselves, cdrs [commanders]. You are not what you think you are and I know it.

COL Ted Westhusing

Life needs trust. Trust is no more for me here in Iraq.

== Controversy surrounding his death ==
The New York Times/Los Angeles Times reporter T. Christian Miller reported on the possibility that he was murdered by defense contractors who feared he would become a whistle-blower against their alleged fraudulent activity throughout the Iraq War.

== Funeral ==
Westhusing's funeral service and burial at West Point were attended by General Petraeus (who returned from Iraq for the event) as well as three other generals of two stars or more.
