= Backyard Brawl (disambiguation) =

Backyard Brawl is an American college football rivalry between the University of Pittsburgh Panthers and West Virginia University Mountaineers.

Backyard Brawl may also refer to:

- Millsaps–Mississippi College rivalry, known as the Backyard Brawl, a sports rivalry between the Millsaps College Majors and the Mississippi College Choctaws
- "Backyard Brawl", song on 2003 album The Eyes of Alice Cooper

== See also ==
- Backyard Bowl Series
