= Keith Burns (linebacker) =

American football player and coach (born 1972)

Howard Bison
- Title: Special teams coordinator

Personal information
- Born: May 16, 1972 (age 54); Greeleyville, South Carolina, U.S.
- Listed height: 6 ft 2 in (1.88 m)
- Listed weight: 235 lb (107 kg)

Career information
- High school: T. C. Williams (Alexandria, Virginia)
- College: Oklahoma State
- NFL draft: 1994: 7th round, 210th overall pick

Career history

Playing
- Denver Broncos (1994–1998); Chicago Bears (1999); Denver Broncos (2000–2003); Tampa Bay Buccaneers (2004); Denver Broncos (2005–2006)

Coaching
- Denver Broncos (2007–2012) Assistant special teams coach; Washington Redskins (2013) Special teams coordinator; Los Angeles Chargers (2018–2020) Assistant special teams coach; Los Angeles Chargers (2020) Special teams coordinator; Tennessee State (2021–2025) Special teams coordinator; Howard (2026–present) Special teams coordinator

Awards and highlights
- 2× Super Bowl champion (XXXII, XXXIII); 2× First-team All-Big Eight (1992, 1993)

Career NFL statistics
- Tackles: 187
- Sacks: 1.5
- Forced Fumbles: 6
- Stats at Pro Football Reference

Keith Bernard Burns (born May 16, 1972) is an American football coach and former professional linebacker and special teams player. He was formerly the special teams coordinator for the Washington Redskins of the National Football League (NFL).

== Early life ==
Burns was born in Greeleyville, South Carolina. He was raised by his mother, Tracy, in Alexandria, Virginia, as the youngest of four children. He was a 1990 graduate of T. C. Williams High School in Alexandria, where he won three varsity letters in football, two in basketball, and one in baseball.

== College career ==
Burns lettered in football at Navarro Junior College in Corsicana, Texas, where he garnered first-team JuCo All-America honors, and finished his sophomore season with six sacks, three interceptions, and 192 tackles.

Burns then transferred to Oklahoma State for the 1992–1993 season and immediately made an impact with 126 tackles (102 solo), 5 sacks, and 3 forced fumbles. He was voted captain of the team after just four games and was named the Big Eight Conference's Defensive Newcomer of the Year. Entering his final year at Oklahoma State, he made several pre-season All-America teams and was ranked the No. 1 inside linebacker by The Sporting News. He was named to the conference's All-Big Eight team both of his years there.

== Playing career ==
The Denver Broncos drafted Burns in the seventh round (#210 overall) of the 1994 NFL draft. A Bronco for most of his thirteen-year career, Burns saw playing time as a reserve linebacker and a prominent special teams player. He spent the 1999 season with Chicago Bears, and the 2004 season with Tampa Bay Buccaneers. He won two Super Bowls with the Broncos. For his entire NFL career, Burns played 197 games (3 starts) and totaled 231 special-teams tackles. He also posted 77 career defensive stops (50 solo), 1.5 sacks (9 yds.), one interception (15 yds.), three pass breakups and one forced fumble.

== NFL career statistics ==
Legend
| | Won the Super Bowl |
| **Bold** | Career high |

| Year | Team | Games | | Tackles | | | | Interceptions | | | | Fumbles | | | |
| Year | Team | GP | GS | Comb | Solo | Ast | Sck | Int | Yds | TD | Lng | FF | FR | Yds | TD |
|---|---|---|---|---|---|---|---|---|---|---|---|---|---|---|---|
| 1994 | DEN | 11 | 1 | 18 | 15 | 3 | 0.0 | 0 | 0 | 0 | 0 | 0 | 0 | 0 | 0 |
| 1995 | DEN | 16 | 0 | 13 | 10 | 3 | **1.5** | 0 | 0 | 0 | 0 | 0 | **2** | 0 | 0 |
| 1996 | DEN | 16 | 0 | 1 | 1 | 0 | 0.0 | 0 | 0 | 0 | 0 | 0 | 0 | 0 | 0 |
| 1997 | DEN | 16 | 0 | 1 | 1 | 0 | 0.0 | 0 | 0 | 0 | 0 | 0 | 0 | 0 | 0 |
| 1998 | DEN | 16 | 0 | 9 | 7 | 2 | 0.0 | 0 | 0 | 0 | 0 | 0 | 1 | 0 | 0 |
| 1999 | CHI | 15 | 0 | 18 | 17 | 1 | 0.0 | **1** | **15** | 0 | **15** | 0 | 1 | 0 | 0 |
| 2000 | DEN | 13 | 0 | 24 | **21** | 3 | 0.0 | 0 | 0 | 0 | 0 | **2** | 1 | 0 | 0 |
| 2001 | DEN | 16 | 0 | 22 | 19 | 3 | 0.0 | 0 | 0 | 0 | 0 | 1 | **2** | 0 | 0 |
| 2002 | DEN | 16 | 1 | 12 | 9 | 3 | 0.0 | 0 | 0 | 0 | 0 | 1 | 0 | 0 | 0 |
| 2003 | DEN | 16 | 0 | **27** | 18 | **9** | 0.0 | 0 | 0 | 0 | 0 | 0 | 0 | 0 | 0 |
| 2004 | TAM | 16 | 0 | 12 | 8 | 4 | 0.0 | 0 | 0 | 0 | 0 | 1 | 0 | 0 | 0 |
| 2005 | DEN | 15 | 1 | 19 | 16 | 3 | 0.0 | 0 | 0 | 0 | 0 | 0 | 1 | 0 | 0 |
| 2006 | DEN | 15 | 0 | 11 | 10 | 1 | 0.0 | 0 | 0 | 0 | 0 | 1 | 0 | 0 | 0 |
| | | 197 | 3 | 187 | 152 | 35 | 1.5 | 1 | 15 | 0 | 15 | 6 | 8 | 0 | 0 |

== Coaching career ==
On March 27, 2007, the Broncos announced Burns would retire as special teams captain and assume the role of instructing the special teams. He was given the title of assistant special teams coach in 2011.

Burns was hired by the Washington Redskins to be their special teams coordinator on February 11, 2013. In moving to Washington, he rejoined Mike Shanahan who was his coach in Denver and who also gave Burns his first coaching job. In his first coaching position Keith Burns's special teams unit struggled during 2013 season. According to Football Outsiders, under Burns's leadership, the Redskins' special teams unit finished the 2013 regular season ranked last in points compared to league average. After less than a year in the position, Burns was dismissed by the Redskins on December 30, 2013, along with Mike Shanahan.

== Personal life ==
Burns met his wife, Michelle, at college. They have three children together. His oldest daughter, Danielle is a star for the women's basketball team at Fordham University, wearing number 22. Danielle earned her master's degree in just four years, having graduated in three years. His other daughter Rachel is currently a member of Charleston Southern. His son Keith is still in High School. In Keith Burns's off time, he has performed stand-up comedy routines around the country.
