= Sulecio Sanford =

American football player (born 1976)

No. 80, 21, 81
- Position: Wide receiver

Personal information
- Born: March 23, 1976 (age 50); Milledgeville, Georgia, U.S.
- Listed height: 5 ft 10 in (1.78 m)
- Listed weight: 190 lb (86 kg)

Career information
- High school: Baldwin High School (Milledgeville)
- College: Middle Tennessee
- NFL draft: 1999: 7th round, 221st overall pick

Career history
- Chicago Bears (1999–2000); → Scottish Claymores (2000); Miami Dolphins (2002)*; BC Lions (2002)*; Detroit Fury (2003); Calgary Stampeders (2004); Saskatchewan Roughriders (2005)*
- * Offseason or practice squad member only
- Stats at ArenaFan.com

Sulecio Sanford (born March 23, 1976) is an American former professional football wide receiver who played in the Canadian Football League (CFL), Arena Football League (AFL), and NFL Europe. He played college football at Middle Tennessee, and was selected by the Chicago Bears in the seventh round of the 1999 NFL draft.

== Early life ==
Sulecio Sanford was born on March 23, 1976, in Milledgeville, Georgia. He participated in high school football and track at Baldwin High School in Milledgeville.

== College career ==
Sanford enrolled at a few junior colleges in California and spent a year working before enrolling at Georgia Military College, where he played college football from 1995 to 1996 as a running back. He then transferred to Middle Tennessee State University, where he was converted to wide receiver for the first time in his football career. He was a two-year letterman for the Middle Tennessee Blue Raiders from 1997 to 1998. As a senior in 1998, Sanford had a school record 54 receptions, good for 674 yards and seven touchdowns. He also returned 15 kicks for 385 yards and 17 punts for 139 yards. He also tied a school record with a 99-yard kick return touchdown in 1998.

== Professional career ==
Sanford was selected by the Chicago Bears in the seventh round, with the 221st overall pick, of the 1999 NFL draft. He reportedly had a 4.38 second 40-yard dash. Bears vice president of player personnel Mark Hatley said that Sanford "was one of the fastest guys on the board when the draft started." Sanford was released and then signed to the practice squad on September 6, 1999, before the start of the regular season. He was promoted to the active roster on December 22, 1999, but was a healthy scratch for the final two games of the season. In 2000, the Bears allocated Sanford to NFL Europe to play for the Scottish Claymores. He played in nine games for the Claymores during the 2000 NFL Europe season, catching 23 passes for 275 yards and three touchdowns while also returning 13 kickoffs for 420 yards and one touchdown and six punts for 143 yards. He earned NFL Europe Special Teams Player of the Week twice in 2000. The Claymores finished the year with a 6–4 record and lost World Bowl 2000 to the Rhein Fire 13–10. The Bears placed Sanford on injured reserve due to a hyperextended left knee on August 27, 2000, where he spent the entire 2000 NFL season. He was released by Chicago on August 23, 2001.

Sanford signed with the NFL's Miami Dolphins on March 11, 2002. He was later released on August 25, 2002.

In October 2002, Sanford was signed to the practice roster of the BC Lions of the Canadian Football League (CFL). He became a free agent after the 2002 season.

Sanford signed with the Detroit Fury of the Arena Football League (AFL) on January 17, 2003. He was placed on injured reserve on February 13, and was activated on March 4, 2003. He played in 11 games, starting six, overall for Detroit during the 2003 AFL season, catching 53 passes for 488 yards and 11 touchdowns.

Sanford signed with the Calgary Stampeders of the CFL on February 3, 2004. On October 22, 2004, as time was expiring against the BC Lions, Calgary slotback Mike Juhasz caught a pass and punted the ball downfield. Sanford scooped up the loose ball and ran it into the end zone for the apparent game-winning touchdown. However, the officials controversially called back the touchdown after claiming that Sanford was not behind Juhasz before the punt so he was not eligible to recover the ball. On October 25, 2004, Sanford was noted for taping video proof of the play to his practice jersey. The same day, the CFL admitted that the officials made an error and that Sanford had indeed been eligible to recover the ball. Overall in 2004, Sanford dressed in all 18 games for the Stampeders, totaling 45 receptions for 577 yards and three touchdowns on 71 targets, and 31 kickoff returns for 631 yards. He was released on June 9, 2005.

Sanford briefly spent time on the Saskatchewan Roughriders' practice roster in 2005.
