= Steven Parker (defensive back) =

American football player (born 1995)

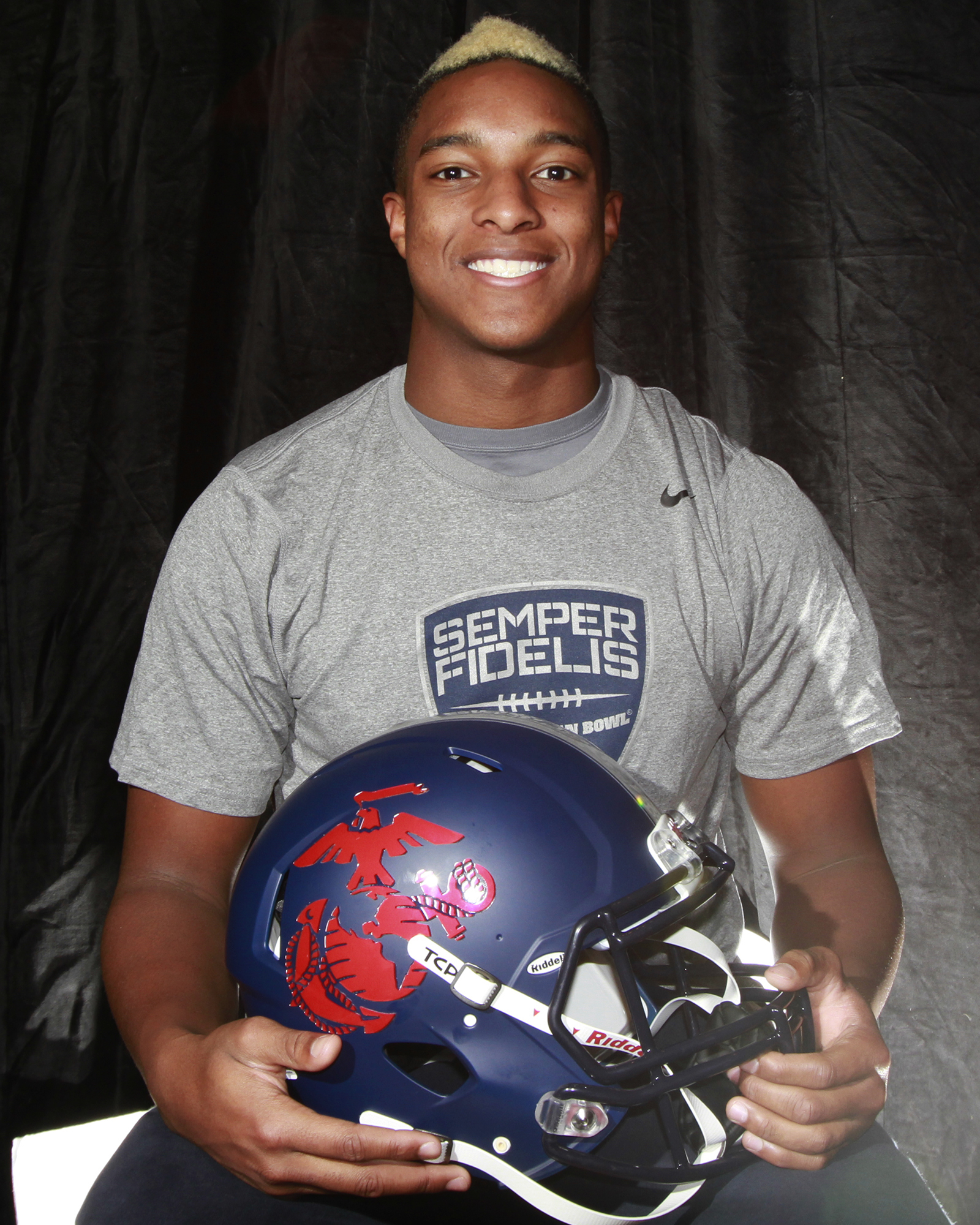
- Parker c. 2014

No. 26, 40, 38
- Position: Safety

Personal information
- Born: December 14, 1995 (age 30); Jenks, Oklahoma, U.S.
- Listed height: 6 ft 1 in (1.85 m)
- Listed weight: 210 lb (95 kg)

Career information
- High school: Jenks
- College: Oklahoma
- NFL draft: 2018: undrafted

Career history
- Los Angeles Rams (2018–2019)*; Miami Dolphins (2019); Minnesota Vikings (2020)*; Dallas Cowboys (2020); New York Giants (2021); Washington Commanders (2022)*; Arizona Cardinals (2022)*; Tennessee Titans (2022)*; Seattle Seahawks (2022)*
- * Offseason or practice squad member only

Awards and highlights
- 2× second-team All-Big 12 (2015, 2017)

Career NFL statistics
- Total tackles: 34
- Pass deflections: 5
- Interceptions: 2
- Stats at Pro Football Reference

Steven Parker (born December 14, 1995) is an American former professional football player who was a safety in the National Football League (NFL). He played college football for the Oklahoma Sooners.

== Early life ==
Parker grew up in Jenks, Oklahoma, and attended Jenks High School. In football, Parker played both safety and wide receiver.

As a senior, he had 34 receptions for 622 yards and 9 touchdowns on offense and 44 tackles and 4 interceptions on defense. He was named Oklahoma State Player of the Year by Tulsa World.

Parker also played basketball and ran track. He committed to play college football at the University of Oklahoma over offers from Oklahoma State University, Auburn University, and Texas A&M University.

== College career ==
As a freshman, he appeared in all 13 games with four at the nickleback position, tallying 31 tackles, a sack and six pass breakups.

As a sophomore, he became the Sooners starting free safety and was named second-team All-Big 12 Conference after making 60 total tackles with 1.5 sacks and four pass breakups, including a deflection of a pass on a two-point conversion attempt in the final moments of a 30–29 win over TCU.

As a junior, he was named honorable-mention All-Big 12, after recording 63 tackles, two interceptions and four pass breakups.

As a senior, he finished fourth on the team with 63 tackles and third with six pass breakups and received second-team All-Big 12 honors. He finished his collegiate career with 217 tackles (11 for loss), 3.5 sacks, 20 pass breakups, two interceptions, four fumble recoveries and a forced fumble.

== Professional career ==
Pre-draft measurables
Height	Weight	Arm length	Hand span	40-yard dash	10-yard split	20-yard split	20-yard shuttle	Three-cone drill	Vertical jump	Broad jump	Bench press
6 ft 1 1/8 in (1.86 m)	203 lb (92 kg)	33 1/4 in (0.84 m)	9 1/2 in (0.24 m)	4.58 s	1.57 s	2.72 s	4.33 s	6.83 s	36.5 in (0.93 m)	10 ft 6 in (3.20 m)	9 reps
All values from Pro Day

=== Los Angeles Rams ===
Parker was signed as an undrafted free agent by the Los Angeles Rams after the 2018 NFL draft on April 28. He was waived by the Rams at the end of training camp, but was subsequently re-signed to the team's practice squad. He was waived again at the end of the Rams preseason on August 31, 2019.

=== Miami Dolphins ===
Parker was claimed off waivers by the Miami Dolphins on September 1, 2019. He made his NFL debut on September 8, 2019, against the Baltimore Ravens. Parker made his first career start on September 22, 2019, against the Dallas Cowboys, making three tackles and defending a pass in a 6–31 loss. He recorded his first career interception on November 10, 2019, against the Indianapolis Colts, picking off a pass from Brian Hoyer and Eric Ebron in the end zone in the Dolphins 16–12 win. In week 14 against the New York Jets, Parker intercepted his second pass of the season off a pass thrown by Sam Darnold during the 22–21 loss. He finished his rookie season with 20 tackles, three passes defended and two interceptions in 14 games with four starts.

On August 13, 2020, Parker was waived by the Dolphins.

=== Minnesota Vikings ===
Parker was claimed off waivers by the Minnesota Vikings on August 14, 2020. He was waived by the Vikings during final roster cuts on September 5, 2020.

=== Dallas Cowboys ===
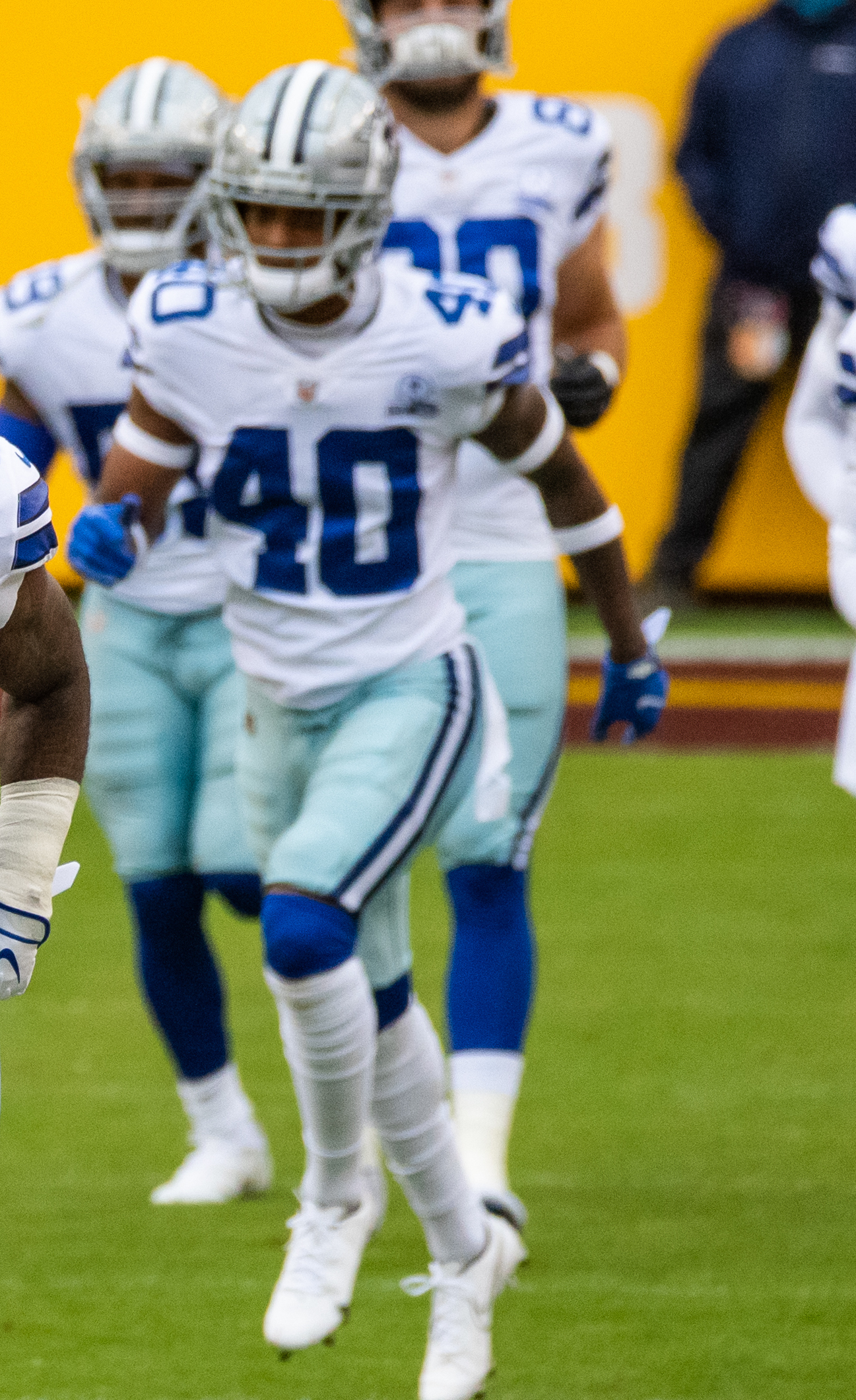
Parker with the Dallas Cowboys in 2020

On September 15, 2020, Parker was signed to the Dallas Cowboys practice squad. He was elevated to the active roster on October 10 and October 19 for the team's weeks 5 and 6 games against the New York Giants and Arizona Cardinals, and reverted to the practice squad following each game. He was promoted to the active roster on October 22. He was placed on injured reserve on December 7, 2020. On January 2, 2021, Parker was activated off of injured reserve. He appeared in 8 games as a reserve and played mostly on special teams, while collecting 8 tackles.

On August 31, 2021, Parker was waived by the Cowboys.

=== New York Giants ===
On September 21, 2021, Parker signed with the New York Giants' practice squad. On November 1, 2021, Parker was signed to the active roster. On November 2, 2021, Parker was waived from the active roster and re-signed to the practice squad. On November 22, 2021, Parker was elevated from the practice squad for the game against the Tampa Bay Buccaneers. On November 28,2021, Parker was elevated from the practice squad for the second time this season for the game against the Philadelphia Eagles. On December 4, 2021, Parker was promoted to the active roster.

=== Washington Commanders ===
On August 7, 2022, Parker signed with the Washington Commanders. He was released on August 30.

=== Arizona Cardinals ===
On September 1, 2022, Parker was signed to the Arizona Cardinals practice squad. He was released off the practice squad on September 20, 2022.

=== Tennessee Titans ===
On October 18, 2022, Parker was signed to the practice squad of the Tennessee Titans. He was released on October 31.

=== Seattle Seahawks ===
On December 27, 2022, Parker was signed to the Seattle Seahawks practice squad.
