= Skelly Field at H. A. Chapman Stadium =

American football stadium in Tulsa, Oklahoma, U.S.

- Skelly Stadium
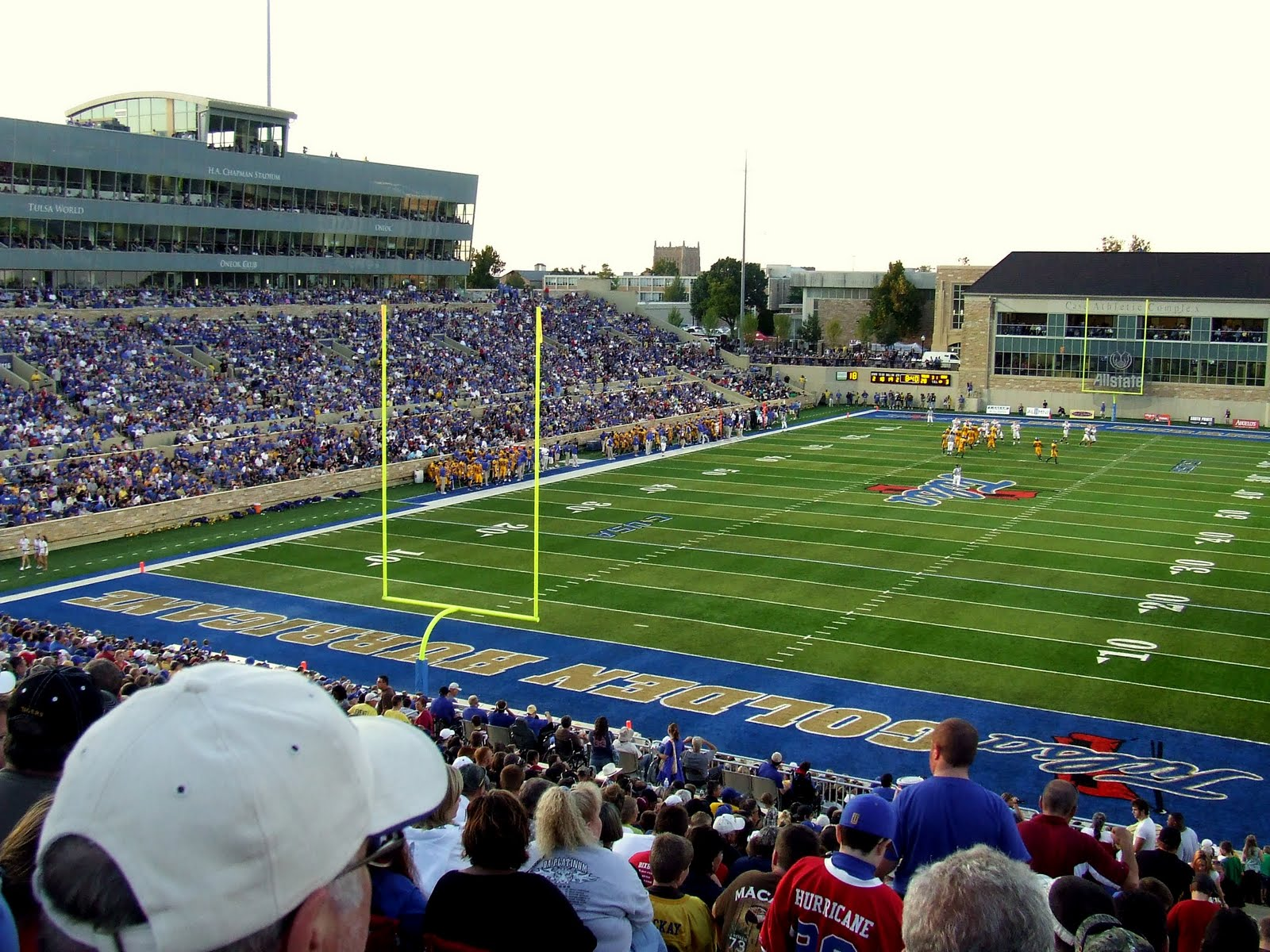
- View from southeast in 2009

- Location in the United States Location in Oklahoma
- Interactive map of Skelly Field at H. A. Chapman Stadium
- Full name: Skelly Field at H. A. Chapman Stadium
- Former names: Skelly Stadium (1947–2007); Skelly Field (1930–1947)
- Address: 3112 East 8th Street; Tulsa, Oklahoma; U.S.
- Coordinates: 36°8′55″N 95°56′38″W
- Owner: University of Tulsa
- Operator: University of Tulsa Athletics
- Capacity: 30,000 (present) List: Former capacity: 35,542 (2005–2007); 40,385 (1965–2004); 19,500 (1947–1964); 14,500 (1930–1946)
- Type: Stadium
- Surface: FieldTurf (2000–present) List: Former surfaces: Stadia Turf (1991–1999); Astroturf (1982–1990); Tartan Turf (1972–1981); Natural grass (1930–1971)
- Record attendance: 47,350 (vs. #1 Oklahoma, 1987)
- Current use: Football

Construction
- Groundbreaking: May 11, 1930
- Opened: October 4, 1930; 96 years ago
- Cost: $275,000 (all in tax money) (approximate, original) ($5.3 million in 2025)
- Architect: Smith & Senter

Tenants
- Football: Tulsa Golden Hurricane (NCAA) (1930–present); Oklahoma Outlaws (USFL) (1984); Soccer: Tulsa Roughnecks (NASL) (1978–1984); Tulsa Tornados (USL) (1985)

Website
- tulsahurricane.com/skellyfield

Skelly Field at H. A. Chapman Stadium is an outdoor college football stadium located on the campus of the University of Tulsa in Tulsa, Oklahoma, United States. Commonly known as H. A. Chapman Stadium, it is the home field for the Tulsa Golden Hurricane of the American Athletic Conference.

The HA Chapman Stadium opened 96 years ago in 1930 and its current seating capacity is around 30,000 for football, following the renovation of 2008. The FieldTurf playing field has a traditional north-south alignment at an approximate elevation of 770 feet (235 m) above sea level.

== History ==
The 14,500-seat stadium opened in 1930 as Skelly Field, named for its primary benefactor, William Skelly, the founder of Skelly Oil. Tulsa defeated Arkansas 26–6 at the inaugural game on October 4.

In 1947, the north stands were added and the stadium was renamed Skelly Stadium. In 1965, the track was removed, the field was lowered, the west stands were expanded and the south stands were added, bringing the capacity to 40,385 seats. In February 2005, the north stands were demolished to make way for the new Case Athletic Complex, reducing the seating to 35,542. In 2007–2008, the stadium was renovated, reducing capacity to 30,000

Located on historic U.S. Route 66, the stadium hosted the Oklahoma Outlaws of the United States Football League (USFL) in 1984. Skelly was once the principal home field for two American football legends – future NFL Hall-of-Famer (and later U.S. Congressman) Steve Largent when he played for the University of Tulsa and Doug Williams of the Oklahoma Outlaws, who later was a Super Bowl MVP for the Washington Redskins. The stadium was also home to the Tulsa Roughnecks of the North American Soccer League 1978–1984 and the short-lived Tulsa Mustangs of the AFA.

On April 26, 2007, it was reported that, with a renovation project underway, the stadium was renamed as Skelly Field at H. A. Chapman Stadium after the primary benefactor of the renovation.

The stadium is also used for the Jenks–Union football rivalry games.

== Attendance ==
The stadium's attendance record was established 39 years ago in 1987, when 47,350 watched top-ranked Oklahoma shut out Tulsa 65–0 on September 26.

=== Top ten single-game attendances ===
Rank	Attendance	Date	Opponent	Result
1	47,350	September 26, 1987	No. 1 Oklahoma	L, 65–0
2	41,235	September 13, 1986	Oklahoma State	W, 27–23
3	40,785	September 9, 1989	Oklahoma State	W, 20–10
4	40,385	September 18, 1993	Oklahoma State	L, 16–10
4	40,385	September 20, 1997	Missouri	L, 42–31
4	40,385	September 12, 1998	Oklahoma State	W, 35–20
4	40,385	September 9, 2000	Oklahoma State	L, 36–26
4	40,385	August 30, 2002	No. 1 Oklahoma	L, 37–0
9	40,248	November 17, 1990	Montana State	W, 20–2
10	40,235	September 29, 1984	No. 10 Oklahoma State	L, 31–7

=== Largest season attendance average ===
The highest attendance average in a season was 31,236 in 1991 with 7 games.

Rank	Season	Average	Games
1	1991	31,236	7
2	1965	28,899	4
3	1982	28,355	5
4	1989	25,388	5
5	1993	25,077	5
6	1992	24,883	6
7	1996	24,814	5
8	1995	24,538	6
9	1987	24,074	4
10	1990	23,917	5

== Wins ==
=== Tulsa's Victories at Skelly Field ===
Win	Date	Opponent	Score	Attendance
First win	October 4, 1930	Arkansas	26–6	10,000
25th win	October 27, 1934	Kansas State	21–0	12,000
50th win	October 18, 1941	Saint Louis	33–7	8,500
75th win	November 22, 1945	Arkansas	45–12	17,000
100th win	November 10, 1951	Kansas State	42–26	13,226
125th win	November 15, 1958	Texas Tech	9–7	12,278
150th win	October 23, 1965	Cincinnati	49–8	24,867
175th win	September 29, 1973	Cincinnati	16–13	24,000
200th win	November 3, 1979	Wichita State	28–26	17,821
225th win	October 20, 1984	Wichita State	55–20	12,621
250th win	November 16, 1991	Louisville	40–0	31,717
275th win	September 20, 2003	Arkansas State	54–7	16,231
300th win	October 24, 2008	UCF	49–19	30,000
325th win	October 10, 2015	Louisiana–Monroe	34–24	17,490
350th win	September 28, 2023	Temple	48–26	17,538

== Renovation ==
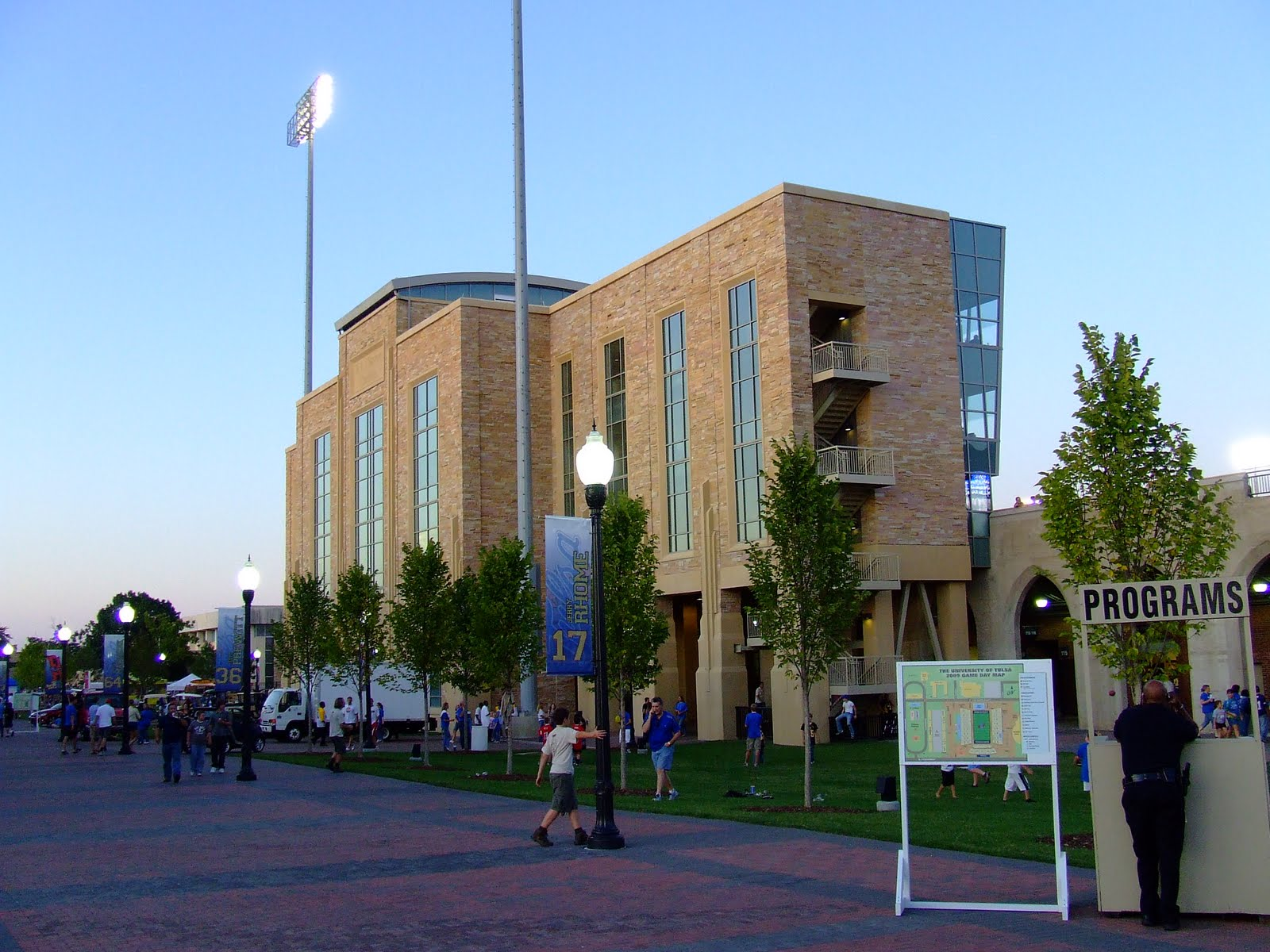
Exterior of west grandstand in 2009

The stadium was renovated following the 2007 season. The project included new seating, a new pressbox, club and loge seating, and a new scoreboard. With the removal of the upper section of the west stands, seating capacity dropped to approximately 30,000, which made Chapman Stadium the smallest stadium in Conference USA.

== See also ==
- List of NCAA Division I FBS football stadiums
