= Chase Beeler =

American football player (born 1986)

No. 61
- Position: Center

Personal information
- Born: December 28, 1986 (age 39); Jenks, Oklahoma, U.S.
- Listed height: 6 ft 3 in (1.91 m)
- Listed weight: 285 lb (129 kg)

Career information
- High school: Jenks
- College: Stanford
- NFL draft: 2011: undrafted

Career history
- San Francisco 49ers (2011–2012)*; Philadelphia Eagles (2012)*
- * Offseason or practice squad member only

Awards and highlights
- Consensus All-American (2010); First-team All-Pac-10 (2010); Second-team All-Pac-10 (2009)
- Stats at Pro Football Reference

Chase Beeler (born December 28, 1986) is an American former professional football player who was a center for the St. Louis Rams of the National Football League (NFL). He played college football for the Stanford Cardinal, earning consensus All-American honors in 2010. The San Francisco 49ers signed him as an undrafted free agent in 2011. He is currently a principal with the private equity firm, Altamont Capital Partners.

== Early life ==
A native of Jenks, Oklahoma, Beeler attended Jenks High School. Rated as a three-star recruit by Rivals.com, Beeler was listed as the No. 22 offensive guard prospect in the class of 2006.

He received an athletic scholarship to attend Stanford University, and played for coach Jim Harbaugh's Stanford Cardinal football team from 2007 to 2010.

== Professional career ==
Beeler was signed by the San Francisco 49ers as an undrafted free agent following the 2011 NFL draft, but was released by the 49ers on September 3, 2011. The following day, he was signed to the 49ers practice squad.

On September 1, 2012, he joined the Philadelphia Eagles practice squad. Later that month, he joined the St. Louis Rams practice squad. A few months later, Beeler was no longer with the Rams.
