= Oklahoma Aquarium =

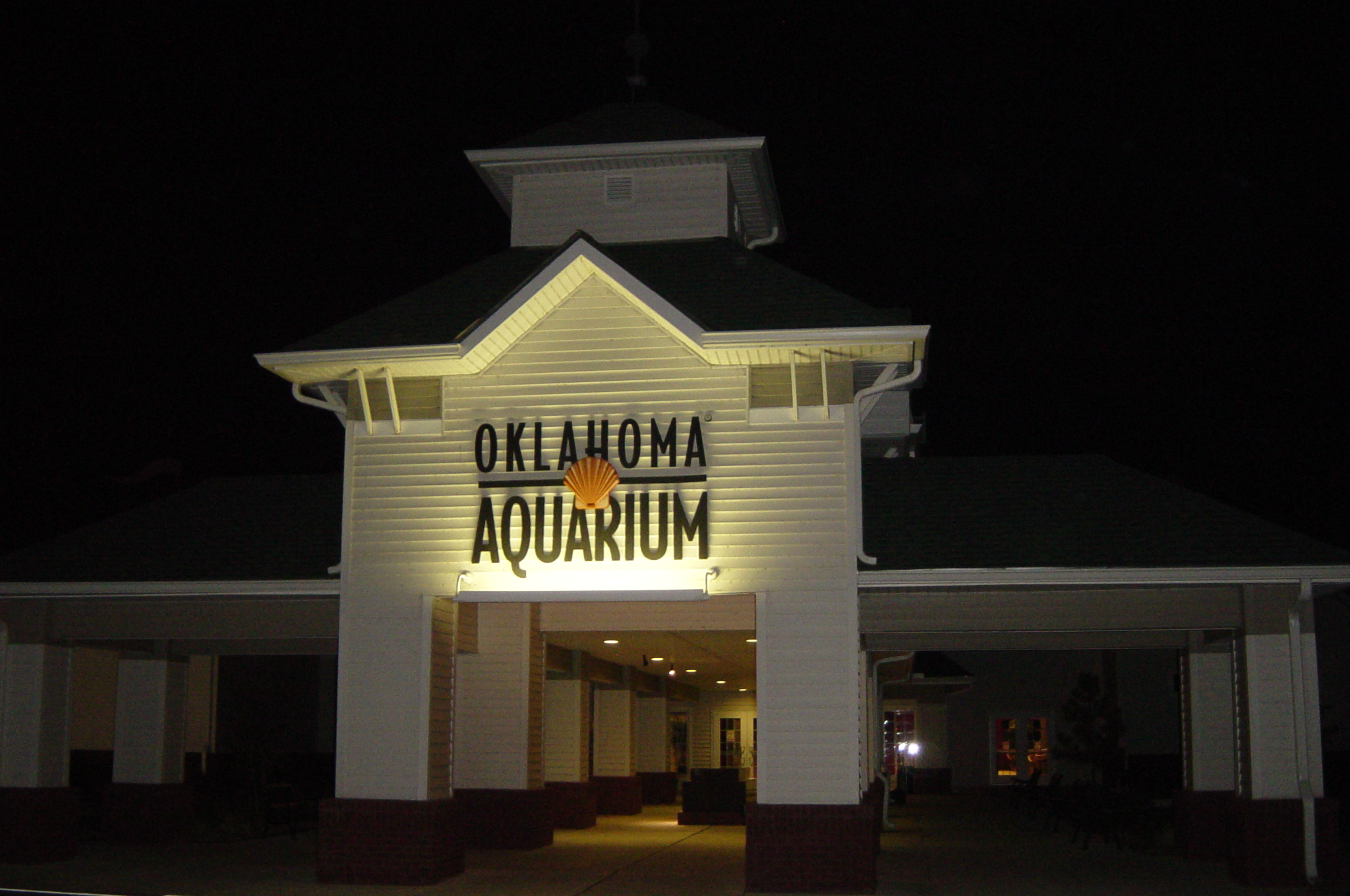
- Main entrance
- Interactive map of Oklahoma Aquarium
- 36.019488°N 95.957165°W
- Date opened: May 28, 2003
- Location: Jenks, Oklahoma, United States
- Land area: 72,000 sq ft (6,700 m^{2})
- No. of animals: 10,000+
- No. of species: 500+
- Volume of largest tank: 500,000 US gallons (1,900 m^{3})
- Total volume of tanks: 1,000,000 US gallons (3,800 m^{3})
- Annual visitors: 410,826 (2023)
- Website: www.okaquarium.org

The Oklahoma Aquarium is 72,000-square-foot (6,700 m^{2}) public aquarium built in 2002 and opened on May 28, 2003, in Jenks, a southern suburb of Tulsa.

== Exhibit ==
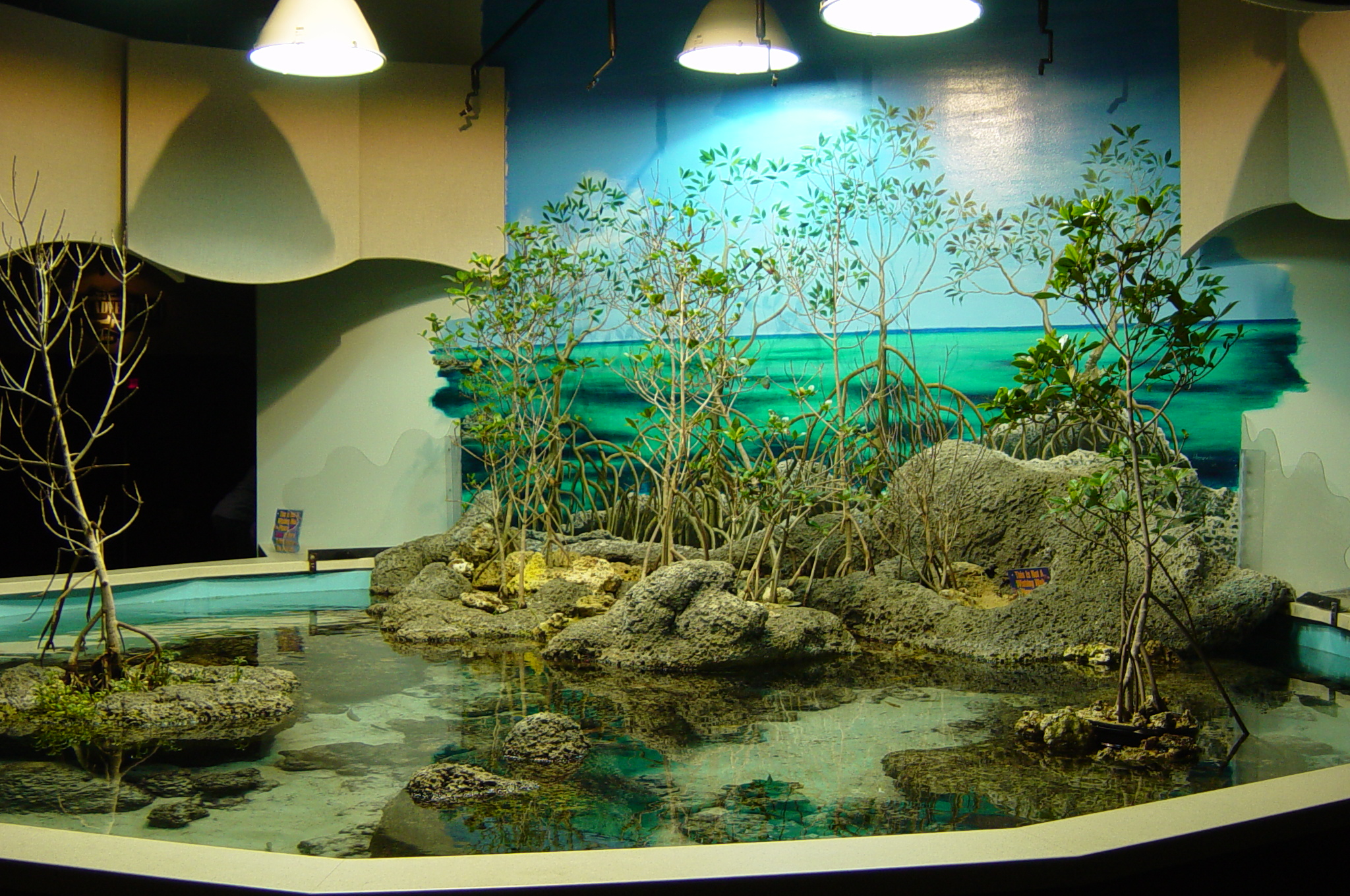
The mangrove environment near the Stingray touch pool.

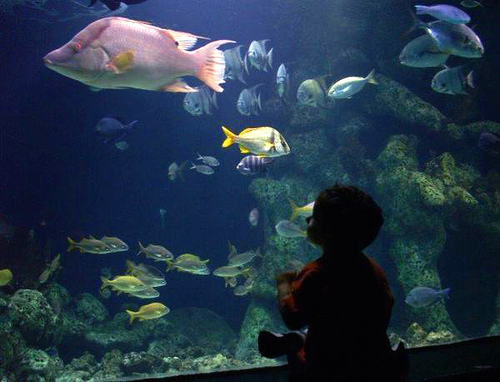
A fish tank at the Oklahoma Aquarium

The Oklahoma Aquarium is home to the world's largest exhibit of bull sharks which you can explore in the unique, walk through tunnel. You can also see their loggerhead sea turtles, zebra sharks, and humphead wrasse. The aquarium has more than 500 species and 10,000 animals.

The original concept of the idea was brought to the forefront by Tulsa and abandoned. The City of Jenks' former Mayor and City Manager Mike Tinker, former City Manager Randy Ewing, P.R. Ramey and several other Tulsa philanthropists pitched their money alongside tax dollars to fund the project.

The facility, designed by the architecture firm SPARKS and constructed by Ross Group, features eight exhibits including sites that focus on invertebrates, Oklahoma species, Ozark habitats, a coral reef, and sharks.

The aquarium also formerly housed the Karl and Beverly White National Fishing Tackle Museum, a major collection of 30,000 pieces of antique fishing tackle donated by Karl White. Mr. White withdrew his collection in 2010.

In July 2003, Discovery Channel's naturalist and filmmaker Nigel Marven (along with crew) documented four bull sharks at home in the architecturally significant 500,000-US-gallon (1,900,000 L) tank. The resulting shots and commentary were featured in the 2003 edition of Discovery Channel's Shark Week series.

The Oklahoma Aquarium receives part of the funding of the one-cent county sales tax approved in 2005 by voters under Vision 2025. The state legislature has authorized a specialty Oklahoma Aquarium license plate option with some of the fees going to support the facility.
