= Garrett Mills =

American football player (born 1983)

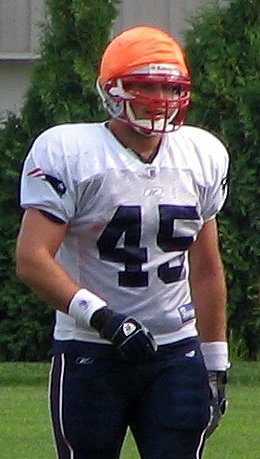
- Mills during the Patriots 2007 training camp

No. 45, 86, 89
- Position: Tight end

Personal information
- Born: October 12, 1983 (age 43); Tulsa, Oklahoma, U.S.
- Listed height: 6 ft 1 in (1.85 m)
- Listed weight: 235 lb (107 kg)

Career information
- High school: Jenks (Jenks, Oklahoma)
- College: Tulsa
- NFL draft: 2006: 4th round, 106th overall pick

Career history
- New England Patriots (2006); Minnesota Vikings (2007–2009); Philadelphia Eagles (2010); Cincinnati Bengals (2010); New England Patriots (2011)*
- * Offseason or practice squad member only

Awards and highlights
- Second-team All-American (2005)

Career NFL statistics
- Receptions: 9
- Receiving yards: 110
- Stats at Pro Football Reference

Michael Garrett Mills (born October 12, 1983) is an American former professional football player who was a tight end in the National Football League (NFL). He was selected by the New England Patriots in the fourth round of the 2006 NFL draft. He played college football for the Tulsa Golden Hurricane.

Mills also played for the Minnesota Vikings, Philadelphia Eagles, and Cincinnati Bengals.

== Early life ==
Mills attended Jenks High School in Jenks, Oklahoma, and was a good student and a standout in football and basketball. In football, he led his teams to three Class 6A State Titles, was a three-year starter as a tight end, and as a senior he was named the District Player of the Year and he was named the Tulsa World News Player of the Year. In basketball, Mills was a three-year letterman. Mills graduated from Jenks High School in 2002.

== College career ==
He played college football for the Golden Hurricane at the University of Tulsa, where he set an NCAA record in the 2005 season with 1,235 yards receiving (on 87 receptions), the most yards earned receiving by a tight end in a single season. He won the MVP for the 2005 C-USA Championship game and was an All-America selection.

== Professional career ==
Pre-draft measurables
Height	Weight	Arm length	Hand span	40-yard dash	10-yard split	20-yard split	20-yard shuttle	Three-cone drill	Vertical jump	Broad jump	Bench press
6 ft 1 1/8 in (1.86 m)	241 lb (109 kg)	31 5/8 in (0.80 m)	9 5/8 in (0.24 m)	4.68 s	1.60 s	2.69 s	4.05 s	6.81 s	35.5 in (0.90 m)	9 ft 3 in (2.82 m)	23 reps
All values from NFL Combine

=== New England Patriots (first stint) ===
Mills was selected in the fourth round (106th overall) of the 2006 NFL draft by the Patriots. He was not expected to play solely at tight end in the NFL (unlike David Thomas, the Texas tight end the Patriots drafted just before Mills); the Patriots' depth chart once listed him at both tight end and fullback.

Given that Mills was fourth on the Patriots' depth chart at tight end, he did not see any playing time during the regular season, and was placed on injured reserve in the middle of the 2006 season.

On September 1, 2007, the Patriots released Mills.

=== Minnesota Vikings ===
Mills was claimed off waivers on September 2, 2007, by the Minnesota Vikings and made his regular season debut in the season finale against the Denver Broncos and had his first career reception. Mills was released by the Vikings on September 4, 2010, as part of final cuts in preparation for the beginning of the 2010 NFL season.

=== Philadelphia Eagles ===
Mills was signed to the Philadelphia Eagles' practice squad on September 6, 2010. He was promoted to the active roster on September 13. He was waived on December 21.

=== Cincinnati Bengals ===
Mills was claimed off waivers by the Cincinnati Bengals on December 22, 2010. He was waived on August 16, 2011.

=== New England Patriots (second stint) ===
Mills was claimed off waivers by the Patriots on August 21, but was waived again on August 29. Mills re-signed to the Patriots practice squad on September 14, 2011.
