= Rocky Calmus =

American football player (born 1979)

- Calmus in uniform for the Tennessee Titans during a 2003 preseason game

No. 54
- Position: Linebacker

Personal information
- Born: August 1, 1979 (age 47); Tulsa, Oklahoma, U.S.
- Listed height: 6 ft 3 in (1.91 m)
- Listed weight: 235 lb (107 kg)

Career information
- High school: Jenks (Jenks, Oklahoma)
- College: Oklahoma
- NFL draft: 2002: 3rd round, 77th overall pick

Career history
- Tennessee Titans (2002–2004); Indianapolis Colts (2005)

Awards and highlights
- BCS National Championship (2000); 2× Consensus All-American (2000, 2001); Big 12 Defensive Player of the Year (2000); 2× First-team All-Big 12 (2000, 2001); Second-team All-Big 12 (1999); Butkus Award (2001); Jack Lambert Trophy (2001)

Career NFL statistics
- Total tackles: 89
- Sacks: 1
- Fumble recoveries: 1
- Interceptions: 2
- Stats at Pro Football Reference

Rocky Ayres Calmus (born August 1, 1979) is an American former professional football player who was a linebacker for three seasons in the National Football League (NFL) during the early 2000s. He played college football for the Oklahoma Sooners, earned consensus All-American honors twice, and was recognized as the nation's top college linebacker. The Tennessee Titans selected him in the third round of the 2002 NFL draft.

== Early life ==
Calmus was born in Tulsa, Oklahoma and attended Jenks High School in Jenks, Oklahoma. He played linebacker and running back for the school's football team, which was ranked third nationally and begun a run of six consecutive Oklahoma Class 6A state championships.

== College career ==
While attending the University of Oklahoma, Calmus played for coach John Blake and Bob Stoops's Oklahoma Sooners football team from 1998 to 2001. He was a three-time first-team All-Big 12 selection (1999, 2000, 2001), and a two-time consensus first-team All-American (2000, 2001). Calmus was recognized as the Big 12 Defensive Player of the Year as a junior and senior, and won the Butkus Award as the nation's premier college linebacker following his senior season in 2001. Calmus was a key defensive starter on the 2000 Sooners team that defeated the Florida State Seminoles 13–2 in the Orange Bowl to win the BCS National Championship.

== Professional career ==
Pre-draft measurables
Height	Weight	Arm length	Hand span	Bench press
6 ft 3 1/8 in (1.91 m)	243 lb (110 kg)	32 in (0.81 m)	9 in (0.23 m)	16 reps
All values from NFL Combine

The Tennessee Titans selected Calmus in the third round (77th overall pick) of the 2002 NFL draft, and he played for the Titans from 2002 to 2004. Signed by the Indianapolis Colts for the 2005 season, he appeared in no regular season games for the team. Hampered by injuries throughout his professional career, he retired after the 2005 season. As of 2010 he owned a landscaping business in Franklin, Tennessee.

== Personal ==
His uncle, Dick Calmus, was a baseball pitcher who was signed as a bonus baby and played for the Los Angeles Dodgers and Chicago Cubs in the 1960s.
