= Tyrel Lacey =

American soccer player

Personal information
- Full name: Tyrel Lacey
- Date of birth: February 8, 1986 (age 40)
- Place of birth: Jenks, Oklahoma, U.S.
- Height: 6 ft 4 in (1.93 m)
- Position: Goalkeeper

Youth career
- 1998–2004: Tulsa Nationals '86
- 2004–2008: Tulsa Golden Hurricane

Senior career*
Years	Team	Apps	(Gls)
2007	Colorado Rapids U-23	6	(0)
2009–2010	Lyn	8	(0)
- * Club domestic league appearances and goals as of April 11, 2010

Tyrel Lacey (born February 8, 1986) is an American soccer goalkeeper who is a free agent.

== Personal ==
Lacey grew up in Jenks, Oklahoma. He played for youth club Tulsa Nationals '86 and also attended Jenks High School.

== Club career ==
=== College ===
Lacey played college soccer at the University of Tulsa for Tulsa Golden Hurricane from 2004 to 2008. Making 40 starts from 2005 to 2008 Lacey registered a record low 0.99 goals-against average for his career at the University of Tulsa while also receiving All-Conference USA First Team honors. He was also awarded individual honors, as well as Top Drawer Soccer All-American Team, NSCAA/Adidas NCAA All-Midwest Region Second Team honors, as well as Defensive Player of the Year. During University Lacey also played with Colorado Rapids U-23 in the USL Premier Development League.

=== Professional ===
Upon graduating in 2009, Lacey was drafted by the New England Revolution in the 2009 MLS SuperDraft but opted to finish school and pursue playing overseas.

Lacey first spent time training with Coventry City but is unable to play in England before acquiring a Visa in 2012. After being on trial in Norwegian Premier League club Lyn in July 2009, he signed for the club. On August 5, 2009, he made his debut in a friendly match against Liverpool, putting up an impressive performance in his professional debut. Lacey became Lyn's starting goalkeeper immediately, but missed the end of the season due to an injury. In 2010, Lacey and the rest of Lyn's squad were released when the club went bankrupt and was folded.
