= R. Perry Beaver =

American politician (1938–2014)

Personal information
- Born: January 21, 1953 (age 73); Fayetteville, North Carolina, U.S.

Career information
- High school: Morris (Oklahoma)
- College: Murray State College; Central State; Northwestern

Career history

Playing
- Green Bay Packers (1961)

Coaching
- Jenks High School (1977–1990)

Awards and highlights
- American Indian Athletic Hall of Fame; Oklahoma Coaches Association Hall of Fame

Robert Perry Beaver (December 13, 1938 – July 11, 2014) was an American Muscogee politician and football coach. He was principal chief of the Muscogee (Creek) Nation from 1996 until 2003.

Born in Muskogee, Oklahoma, Beaver attended Morris High School in Morris, Oklahoma, and then went to Murray State College, where he was a junior college football All-American in 1958. He received his bachelor's degree in mathematics from Central State College and his master's degree in education from Northwestern State University.

In 1961, playing under the name Bob Beaver, he was briefly a member of the Green Bay Packers of the National Football League. He then moved into high school coaching. In 1977, he became the head coach at Jenks High School in Jenks, Oklahoma, where he led the team to its first two state championships in 1979 and 1982, and retired after the 1990 season. His career record was 109–53. He is a member of the American Indian Athletic Hall of Fame and the Oklahoma Coaches Association Hall of Fame.

Beaver was elected to the Creek Nation Council in 1984. In 1985, he became second chief. Beaver served as principal chief of the Muscogee (Creek) Nation from 1996 until 2003. As chief he oversaw an expansion of tribal housing and development services. He died at his home in Morris on July 11, 2014.
