= Phillip Dillard =

American football player (born 1986)

No. 49, 55, 46, 50
- Position: Linebacker

Personal information
- Born: December 10, 1986 (age 39); Tulsa, Oklahoma, U.S.
- Listed height: 6 ft 0 in (1.83 m)
- Listed weight: 245 lb (111 kg)

Career information
- High school: Jenks (Jenks, Oklahoma)
- College: Nebraska
- NFL draft: 2010: 4th round, 115th overall pick

Career history
- New York Giants (2010); Carolina Panthers (2011–2012)*; Omaha Nighthawks (2012); San Diego Chargers (2012–2013)*
- * Offseason or practice squad member only

Awards and highlights
- Second-team All-Big 12 (2009)

Career NFL statistics
- Total tackles: 4
- Stats at Pro Football Reference

Phillip Dillard (born December 10, 1986) is an American former professional football player who was a linebacker in the National Football League (NFL). He was selected by the New York Giants in the fourth round of the 2010 NFL draft. He attended Jenks High School in Jenks, Oklahoma, where he was rated as one of the nation's top high school linebackers, then played college football for the Nebraska Cornhuskers. He is the older brother of another highly ranked high school prospect, former Oklahoma University football cornerback Gabe Lynn.

He was waived by the Giants on September 3, 2011. On November 8, 2011, he was signed to the Panthers practice squad.

He played for the Omaha Nighthawks in 2012.
