= Tyler Ott =

American football player (born 1992)

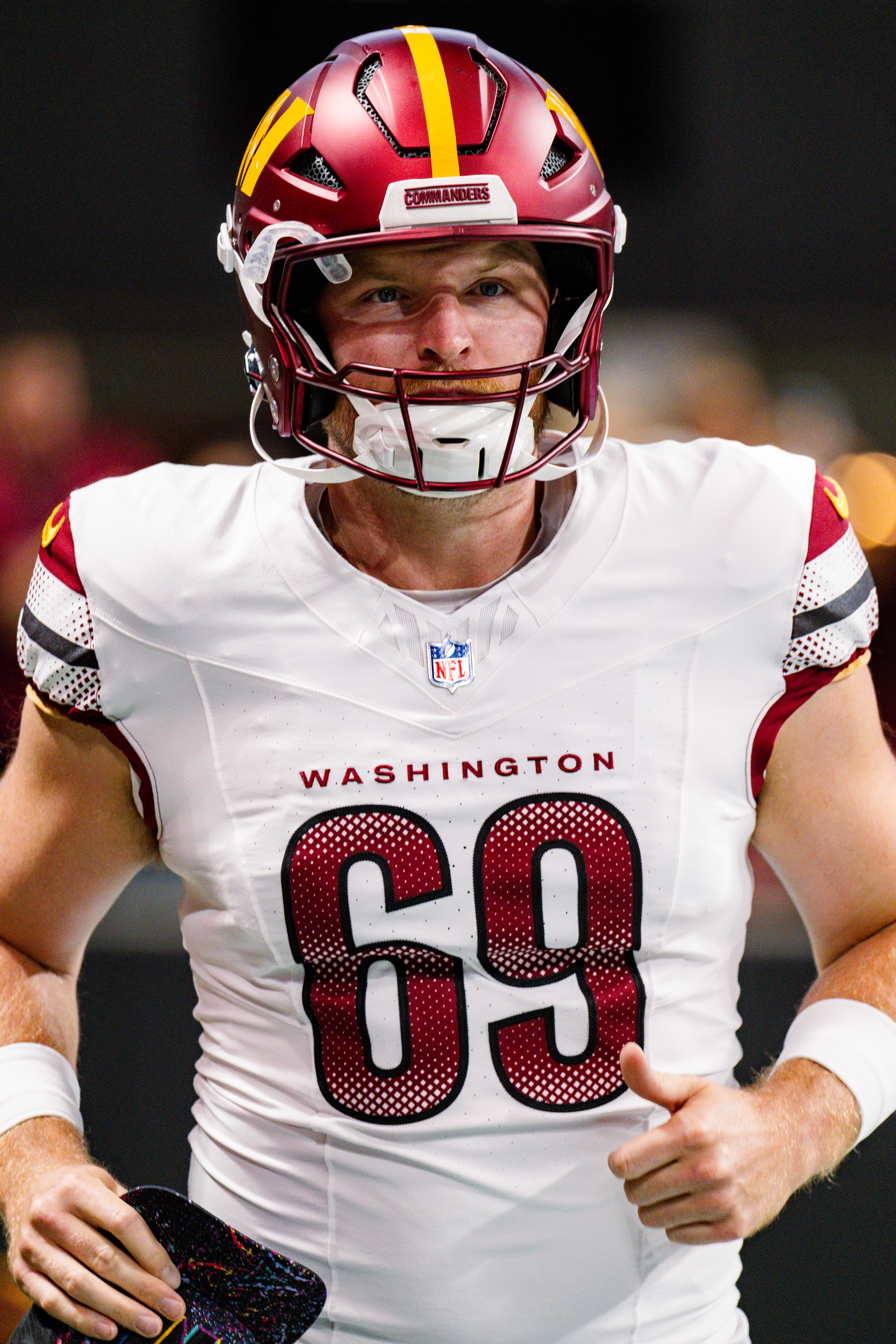
- Ott with the Washington Commanders in 2025

No. 69 – Washington Commanders
- Position: Long snapper
- Roster status: Active

Personal information
- Born: February 28, 1992 (age 34); Tulsa, Oklahoma, U.S.
- Listed height: 6 ft 3 in (1.91 m)
- Listed weight: 252 lb (114 kg)

Career information
- High school: Jenks (Jenks, Oklahoma)
- College: Harvard (2010–2013)
- NFL draft: 2014: undrafted

Career history
- New England Patriots (2014–2015)*; St. Louis Rams (2015)*; New York Giants (2015–2016); Cincinnati Bengals (2016); Seattle Seahawks (2016–2022); Baltimore Ravens (2023); Washington Commanders (2024–present)
- * Offseason or practice squad member only

Awards and highlights
- Pro Bowl (2020)

Career NFL statistics as of Week 8, 2026
- Games played: 142
- Total tackles: 8
- Stats at Pro Football Reference

Tyler Ott (born February 28, 1992) is an American professional football long snapper for the Washington Commanders of the National Football League (NFL). He played college football for the Harvard Crimson and joined the NFL as an undrafted free agent in 2014. Ott has also been a member of the New England Patriots, St. Louis Rams, New York Giants, Cincinnati Bengals, Seattle Seahawks, and Baltimore Ravens.

== Early life ==
Tyler Ott was born in Tulsa, Oklahoma, on February 28, 1992, to Dan and Laurie (now Applekamp) Ott. He attended grade school in the Jenks Public School system, and would go on to attend Jenks High School.

While attending Jenks High School, Ott was a three-year letter winner in football, basketball and track and field. During his high school career, he was a three-year captain in football, and a senior captain in basketball and track and field. He threw shot put and discus in track and field, and ended his career with personal records of 50 feet 2 inches in shot put and 148 feet 9 inches in discus. He would play in three football state championships, winning one in 2007 defeating Tulsa Union High School 42-24.

He played tight end and long snapper for Jenks High School, and finished his high school football career with 47 catches, 771 total receiving yards, and 7 receiving touchdowns.

== College career ==
Ott played college football at Harvard University and was the team's tight end and long snapper all four years. Though he spent his first year at Harvard as a blocking tight end, he would emerge as the team's primary long snapper his sophomore year, and made his first catch as a tight end against Columbia in his junior season. In his senior season, he became one of the two starting tight ends in Harvard's two tight end offense. Following his senior season, Tyler was invited to play in the Senior Bowl after finishing the year with 15 receptions, 188 yards and four touchdowns. On October 28, 2013, he was named National Tight End of the Week by College performance awards, after catching three touchdowns in Harvard's triple overtime loss to Princeton. His three touchdowns against Princeton tied Harvard's record for single game touchdown receptions. Ott played on the Crimson with future San Francisco 49ers fullback Kyle Juszczyk.

He graduated from Harvard in 2014 with a Bachelors of Arts degree in Economics and a minor in Environmental Science & Public Policy. He was a key honorary member of the golf team once shooting an 87 during his Harvard tenure, where he lived in Dunster House.

== Professional career ==
Pre-draft measurables
Height	Weight	Arm length	Hand span	Wingspan	40-yard dash	10-yard split	20-yard split	20-yard shuttle	Vertical jump	Broad jump	Bench press
6 ft 2 3/4 in (1.90 m)	252 lb (114 kg)	31 in (0.79 m)	9 3/8 in (0.24 m)	6 ft 5 1/4 in (1.96 m)	4.82 s	1.67 s	2.75 s	4.51 s	30.5 in (0.77 m)	8 ft 8 in (2.64 m)	18 reps
All values from Pro Day

=== New England Patriots ===
The New England Patriots signed Ott as an undrafted free agent on May 16, 2014. He was released by the Patriots on August 17, 2014. The Patriots re-signed Ott on March 4, 2015. Ott was released by the team on May 5, 2015.

=== St. Louis Rams ===
On May 12, 2015, Ott signed with the St. Louis Rams after a minicamp tryout. He was released on September 1, 2015.

=== New York Giants ===
On December 31, 2015, the New York Giants signed Ott to the active roster, after long snappers Zak DeOssie and Danny Aiken suffered season-ending injuries. Ott became the first Harvard Crimson football player to play for the Giants. On August 30, 2016, he was waived by the Giants. He was re-signed to the practice squad on October 19, 2016. He was released by the Giants on October 25, 2016.

=== Cincinnati Bengals ===
On November 22, 2016, Ott was signed to the practice squad of the Cincinnati Bengals. He was promoted to the active roster on November 26, 2016. He was released on December 20, 2016.

=== Seattle Seahawks ===
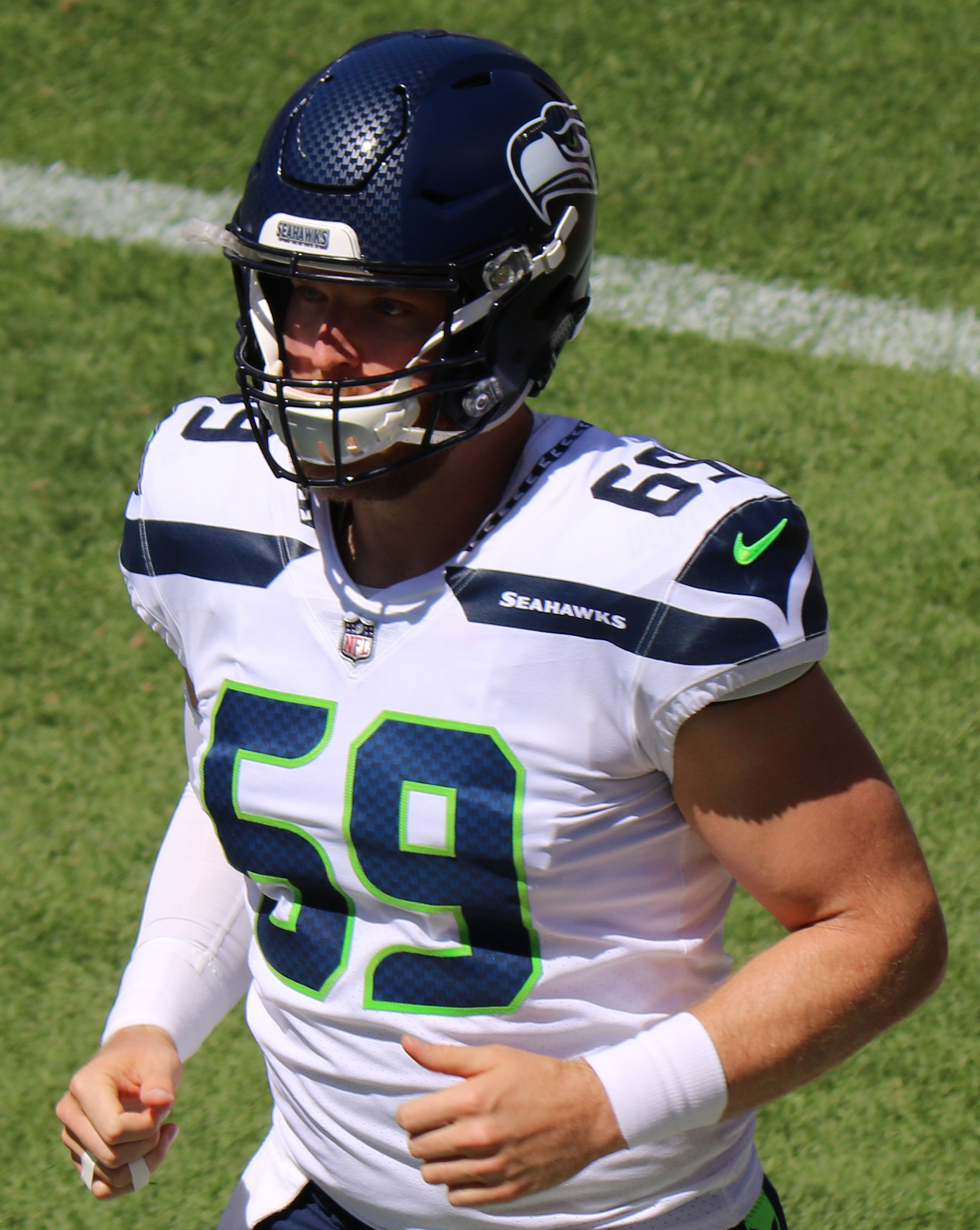
Ott with the Seattle Seahawks in 2018

On January 3, 2017, Ott signed with the Seattle Seahawks to take the place of the injured Nolan Frese. On August 1, 2019, Ott signed a new four-year contract with the Seahawks. On December 21, 2020, Ott was named as the long snapper for the NFC in the 2021 Pro Bowl. On September 14, 2022, Ott was placed on injured reserve.

=== Baltimore Ravens ===
On July 25, 2023, Ott signed with the Baltimore Ravens to replace Nick Moore, who tore his Achilles tendon during the 2023 offseason.

=== Washington Commanders ===
Ott signed a three-year contract with the Washington Commanders on March 14, 2024.
