= Sean Mahan =

American football player (born 1980)

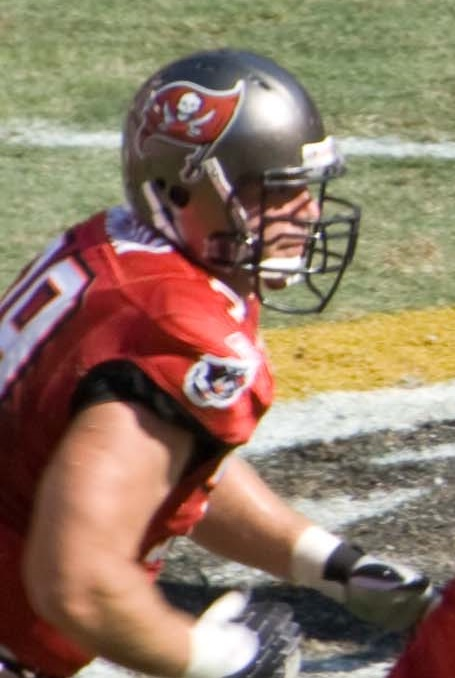
- Mahan with the Tampa Bay Buccaneers in 2009

No. 78, 79, 61
- Position: Center

Personal information
- Born: May 28, 1980 (age 46); Tulsa, Oklahoma, U.S.
- Listed height: 6 ft 3 in (1.91 m)
- Listed weight: 301 lb (137 kg)

Career information
- High school: Jenks (Jenks, Oklahoma)
- College: Notre Dame
- NFL draft: 2003: 5th round, 168th overall pick

Career history
- Tampa Bay Buccaneers (2003–2006); Pittsburgh Steelers (2007); Tampa Bay Buccaneers (2008–2009)

Career NFL statistics
- Games played: 94
- Games started: 56
- Fumble recoveries: 2
- Stats at Pro Football Reference

Sean Christopher Mahan (born May 28, 1980) is an American former professional football player who was a center in the National Football League (NFL). He played college football for the Notre Dame Fighting Irish and was selected by the Tampa Bay Buccaneers in the fifth round of the 2003 NFL draft. Mahan was also a member of the Pittsburgh Steelers.

== Early life ==
Born in Tulsa, Mahan attended Jenks High School of Jenks, Oklahoma and graduated in 1998. He led the football team to four conference titles and three regional titles; he was also a two-time All-City and All-Conference selection. As a senior, Mahan was team captain and MVP.

== College career ==
Mahan played college football at the University of Notre Dame and started 25 of 41 games played from the 1999 to 2002 seasons after redshirting in 1998. With the Notre Dame Fighting Irish football team, Mahan played as center, tackle, and guard. He majored in psychology. Mahan played under head coach Bob Davie from 1999 to 2001 and Tyrone Willingham in 2002.

== Professional career ==
Pre-draft measurables
Height	Weight	Arm length	Hand span	40-yard dash	10-yard split	20-yard split	20-yard shuttle	Three-cone drill	Vertical jump	Broad jump	Bench press	Wonderlic
6 ft 3 in (1.91 m)	301 lb (137 kg)	31 3/8 in (0.80 m)	9 1/2 in (0.24 m)	4.86 s	1.84 s	2.97 s	4.77 s	7.75 s	32 in (0.81 m)	8 ft 9 in (2.67 m)	31 reps	28
All measurables are from the 2003 NFL Scouting Combine.

=== Tampa Bay Buccaneers (first stint) ===
Mahan was selected by the Tampa Bay Buccaneers in the fifth round (168th overall) in the 2003 NFL draft and was one of four Notre Dame offensive linemen drafted that year.

In his rookie year, Mahan wore jersey number 78 and made most of his appearances on special teams. Mahan made his NFL debut at the Atlanta Falcons on September 21. In 2004, Mahan wore jersey number 79 and took over as center for the injured John Wade. The offensive line weakened in 2004; by late November, the line allowed 27 sacks, 4 more than the 2003 total of 23. Throughout the next three seasons, Mahan played in every single game for the Buccaneers and in 2005 was part of the offensive line that helped Cadillac Williams to the NFL Rookie of the Year.

=== Pittsburgh Steelers ===
On March 10, 2007, Mahan signed with the Pittsburgh Steelers to a five-year, $17 million deal. Mahan started all 16 regular season games and the AFC Wild Card game.

=== Tampa Bay Buccaneers (second stint) ===
After a disappointing year at center for the Steelers, and the signing of free agent Justin Hartwig, on September 2, 2008, Mahan was traded back to the Buccaneers for a 7th round 2009 NFL draft pick. He was informed of his release on September 2, 2009. He was re-signed on September 14. He was released again on October 27.
