= Jenks High School =

Coordinates: 36°01′35″N 95°58′08″W

Location
- 205 East B Street; Jenks, Oklahoma 74037; United States

Information
- Type: Co-Educational, Public, Secondary
- Motto: "A Tradition of Excellence with a Vision for Tomorrow"
- Established: 1955
- School district: Jenks Public Schools
- Authority: OSDE
- Principal: David Beiler
- Teaching staff: 189.58 (FTE)
- Grades: 9–12
- Enrollment: 3,577 (2023-2024)
- Student to teacher ratio: 18.87
- Colors: Maroon & White
- Athletics conference: 6A District 1
- Mascot: Trojans
- Rival: Union High School
- USNWR ranking: 8,485
- Newspaper: The Trojan Torch
- Yearbook: The Trojan
- Website: www.jenksps.org/o/high-school

Jenks High School, abbreviated as JHS, is a secondary school located within Tulsa County in Jenks, Oklahoma, United States. It is a part of Jenks Public Schools, which first opened the high school location in 1955 and completed the junior and senior high school in 1959. The high school has over 2,800 students in grades 10–12. With the attached Freshman Academy, the high school campus has over 3,600 students.

The school district (of which this is the sole comprehensive high school) includes most of Jenks and portions of the south side of Tulsa.

== Demographics ==
As of 2017, the average household income in the district was $100,600, compared with the state average of $65,400. As of 2018, 54% of students are white, 7% are Native American, 7% are black, 11% are Asian, and 13% are Hispanic, and 7% are more than one race.

== Academics ==
Jenks High School regularly has the most National Merit Scholars of any public school in the state, including twenty in 2016. Moreover, as of 2025, Jenks High School has had ten or more National Merit Scholars in the last fifteen out of the past seventeen years. The school has produced three presidential scholars since 2001. The college-going rate was 63.8%, compared with the state average of 50.9%. The average ACT test score was 23.8, compared with the state average of 20.8 and the national average of 21.

== Athletics and OSSAA sponsored activities ==
Jenks football program won the 3A state championship in 1979 followed by a 5A state championship in 1982, and the Oklahoma 6A high school football championship in 1993, 1996–2001, 2003, 2006, 2007, 2012–2015, 2020, and 2021 for a total of 18 state championships. The 1997 team, led by Allan Trimble, went 14–0 and outscored its opponents 535–118 and is considered one of the greatest high school football teams in the history of Oklahoma. R. Perry Beaver served as head football coach from 1977 to 1991. The current head coach is Adam Gaylor.

Jenks High School football has produced NFL players Rocky Calmus, Sean Mahan, Garrett Mills, Phillip Dillard, Jerry Wisne, and Chase Beeler among others. Jenks High School baseball has produced MLB all-star Josh Johnson.

The Trojan athletic and non-athletic programs have won 189 state championships in various Oklahoma Secondary School Activities Association (OSSAA) sponsored sports and non-athletic events, as well as state championships in non-OSSAA sports such as gymnastics, hockey, rugby, and lacrosse.

The following table is of the OSSAA sports and OSSAA non-athletic events in which the school compete, as well as the years, if any, during which the school's team won the state championship.

Table of OSSAA sports and non-athletic events Jenks High School championship wins
Sport/Event	Number of championship wins	Years won	Earliest win	Latest win
Academic Bowl	5	2008, 2009, 2010, 2022, 2023	2008	2023
Baseball	4	1997, 2000, 2002, 2021	1997	2021
Boys Basketball	0	N/A	N/A	N/A
Girls Basketball	5	1991, 2000, 2001, 2003, 2004	1991	2004
Cheerleading	2	2010, 2019	2010	2019
Boys Cross Country	15	1984, 1986, 1988, 1989, 1990, 1991, 1992, 1993, 1994, 1998, 2003, 2012, 2013, 2014, 2015	1984	2015
Girls Cross Country	16	1985, 1987, 1988, 1989, 1990, 1994, 1995, 1999, 2000, 2001, 2002, 2006, 2010, 2012, 2019, 2021	1985	2021
Debate	4	2003, 2007, 2012, 2015	2003	2015
Football	18	1979, 1982, 1993, 1996, 1997, 1998, 1999, 2000, 2001, 2003, 2006, 2007, 2012, 2013, 2014, 2015, 2020, 2021	1979	2021
Boys Golf	8	1994, 1997, 1999, 2000, 2001, 2002, 2003, 2004	1994	2004
Girls Golf	16	1982, 1983, 1987, 1988, 1993, 1994, 1995, 1996, 2004, 2005, 2006, 2007, 2009, 2010, 2022, 2023	1982	2023
Boys Soccer	8	1987, 1989, 1990, 1991, 2006, 2019, 2023, 2024	1987	2023
Girls Soccer	10	1988, 1993, 1999, 2000, 2001, 2002, 2003, 2006, 2009, 2023	1988	2023
Fastpitch Softball	0	N/A	N/A	N/A
Slowpitch Softball	1	2011	2011	2011
Boys Swimming	21	1991, 1992, 1996, 1997, 1998, 1999, 2000, 2001, 2002, 2003, 2004, 2007, 2008, 2009, 2010, 2011, 2017, 2019, 2020, 2021, 2022, 2024, 2025	1991	2025
Girls Swimming	14	1990, 1991, 1992, 1994, 2002, 2003, 2004, 2005, 2008, 2009, 2010, 2020, 2021, 2023, 2025	1990	2025
Boys Tennis	17	1991, 1992, 1993, 1994, 1995, 1996, 1997, 1998, 1999, 2000, 2004, 2007, 2015, 2017, 2021, 2022, 2023	1991	2023
Girls Tennis	20	1986, 1989, 1991, 1995, 1996, 1998, 1999, 2000, 2004, 2005, 2007, 2008, 2010, 2011, 2013, 2014, 2015, 2017, 2023, 2024	1986	2023
Boys Track	8	1999, 2000, 2001, 2002, 2003, 2004, 2014, 2025	1999	2025
Girls Track	8	1995, 1997, 1998, 2001, 2002, 2015, 2021, 2022	1995	2022
Volleyball	6	1996, 1997, 2006, 2014, 2021, 2023	1996	2023
Volleyball (Boys)	5	1978, 1981, 1982, 1984, 1986	1978	1986
Wrestling	0	N/A	N/A	N/A
One Act Play	2	1986, 1988	1986	1988

== Music ==
=== Marching band ===
The Jenks Trojan Pride Marching Band has participated in the 2016 and 2024 Rose Parade in Pasadena, California. It also participated in the Bandfest at Pasadena City College on December 30, 2015.

In November 2018, Trojan Pride was a first-time finalist in the Bands of America Grand Nationals at Lucas Oil Stadium in Indianapolis, Indiana.

=== Show choir ===
Jenks High School has three competitive show choirs, the mixed-gender Trojanaires, all-male airmen, and the all-female Trojan Spirit. The Trojanaires have made it to national-level competitions. In 2011, they won third-place honors in a New York City qualifying competition among other top fifteen high-school show choirs in the country.

=== Orchestra ===
JHS has five orchestras including strings, concert, philharmonic, symphony, and chamber.

== Notable alumni ==
- Thomas Hatch, MLB & NPB Pitcher
- Darwin Thompson, NFL football player
- Chase Beeler, NFL football player
- Jennifer Berry, Miss America 2006
- Jim Bridenstine, U.S. House of Representative member, 2013–2018; NASA Administrator, 2018-current
- Trey Callaway, Hollywood writer/producer/showrunner
- Rocky Calmus, NFL football player
- Brad Carson, U.S. House of Representatives member, 2001 to 2005
- Phillip Dillard, NFL football player
- Georgia Frazier, Miss Oklahoma 2015
- Alecia Holden, contestant on the 32nd season of Survivor
- Brian Chad Johnson, TV personality
- Josh Johnson, MLB All-Star pitcher for the Florida/Miami Marlins, Toronto Blue Jays, and San Diego Padres.
- Ben Lamb, professional poker player
- Danielle Laney, Olympic bronze medalist in Taekwondo
- Sean Mahan, NFL football player
- Garrett Mills, NFL football player
- Tyrel Lacey, Professional soccer player
- Brian Nhira, contestant on season 10 of The Voice
- Tyler Ott, NFL football player
- Steven Parker, NFL football player
- Brian Presley, actor
- Jerry Wisne, NFL football player
- Ignacio Yockers, Spanish artistic gymnast
- AleXa (birth name Alexandra Christine Schneiderman), K-pop idol under ZB Label.
