= Mark Hatley =

American football player, coach, executive, and administrator

Profile
- Position: Linebacker

Personal information
- Born: September 19, 1949; Borger, Texas, U.S.
- Died: July 27, 2004 (aged 54); Green Bay, Wisconsin, U.S.
- Listed height: 5 ft 9 in (1.75 m)
- Listed weight: 200 lb (91 kg)

Career information
- High school: Philips (TX)
- College: Oklahoma State (1969–1972)

Career history

Coaching
- Ohio State (1973–1975) Assistant Coach; Tulsa (1976) Assistant Coach; TCU (1977–1982) Assistant Coach; Baylor (1983) Assistant Coach; New Orleans Saints (1984) Scouting and Quality Control Coach; New Orleans Saints (1985) Secondary Coach; Kansas City Chiefs (1987) Linebackers Coach

Operations
- Kansas City Chiefs (1988–1991) Scout; Kansas City Chiefs (1992–1996) Director of Pro Personnel; Chicago Bears (1997–2000) Vice President of Pro Personnel; Chicago Bears (1997–2000) de facto General Manager; Green Bay Packers (2001–2004) Vice President of Football Operations
- Executive profile at Pro Football Reference

Mark Alison Hatley (September 19, 1949 – July 27, 2004) was an American football player, coach, executive, and administrator who was the de facto General Manager of the Chicago Bears from 1997 to 2000. He also held positions for the Ohio State Buckeyes, Tulsa Golden Hurricane, TCU Horned Frogs, Baylor Bears, New Orleans Saints, Kansas City Chiefs, and Green Bay Packers. He also played football for the Oklahoma State Cowboys.

== Early life and education ==
Hatley was born on September 19, 1949, in Borger, Texas, and went to Philips High School. He went to college at Oklahoma State and played linebacker.

== College coaching career ==
Hatley became a coach for the Ohio State Buckeyes after his playing career. He also was a coach for the Tulsa Golden Hurricane, TCU Horned Frogs, and Baylor Bears.

== Professional career ==
=== New Orleans Saints ===
In 1984 Hatley was signed by the New Orleans Saints as a Scouting and Quality Control Coach. In 1985 he was promoted to Secondary Coach.

=== Kansas City Chiefs ===
In 1987 he became the Kansas City Chiefs Linebackers Coach. He also was a Scout (1988–1991) and Director of Pro Personnel (1992–1996).

=== Chicago Bears ===
In 1997 he became the Vice President of Pro Personnel for the Chicago Bears. He was also the de facto General Manager.

=== Green Bay Packers ===
In 2001 he became the Vice President of Football Operations for the Green Bay Packers. He was there until 2004, when he died suddenly at the age of 54.
