= Jerry Wisne =

American football player (born 1976)

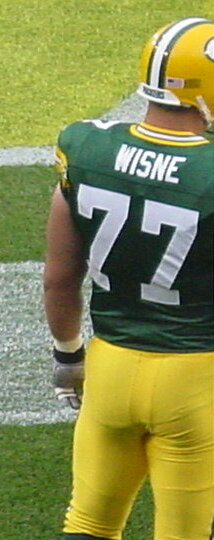
- Wisne with the Green Bay Packers in 2003

No. 79, 77
- Position: Offensive tackle

Personal information
- Born: July 28, 1976 (age 50); Rochester, Michigan, U.S.
- Listed height: 6 ft 6 in (1.98 m)
- Listed weight: 325 lb (147 kg)

Career information
- High school: Jenks (Jenks, Oklahoma)
- College: Notre Dame
- NFL draft: 1999: 5th round, 143rd overall pick

Career history
- Chicago Bears (1999–2000); Minnesota Vikings (2001); Houston Texans (2002)*; St. Louis Rams (2002); Green Bay Packers (2002–2003)
- * Offseason or practice squad member only

Career NFL statistics
- Games played: 9
- Games started: 1
- Stats at Pro Football Reference

Jerry Edward Wisne (born July 28, 1976) is an American former professional football player who was an offensive tackle in the National Football League (NFL). He spent five seasons in the NFL playing for four different teams: Chicago Bears (1999–2000), Minnesota Vikings (2001), St. Louis Rams (2002), and Green Bay Packers (2002–2003). He was selected by the Bears in the fifth round of the 1999 NFL draft with the 143rd overall pick.

Wisne was a high school All-American by USA Today in 1994, and played college football for the Notre Dame Fighting Irish.

== Personal life ==
Wisne Marred with his Wife Shannon and he has Three Girls and Three Boys. His brother Andy played for Notre Dame from 1997-2001.
