= Jenks, Oklahoma =

- City
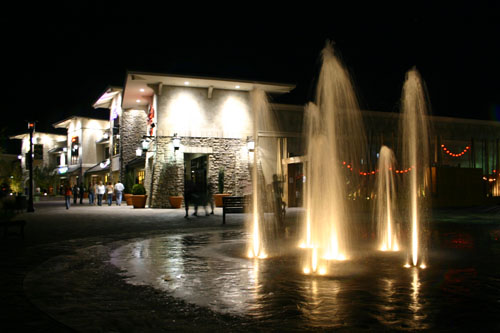
- Riverwalk Crossing on the Arkansas River, Jenks

- Flag
- Nickname(s): "Jenks, America", "Antique Capital of Oklahoma'
- Location within Tulsa County, and the state of Oklahoma
- Coordinates: 36°0′37″N 95°58′47″W
- Country: United States
- State: Oklahoma
- County: Tulsa

Area
  - City: 17.95 sq mi (46.49 km^{2})
  - Land: 17.11 sq mi (44.32 km^{2})
  - Water: 0.84 sq mi (2.17 km^{2})
- Elevation: 617 ft (188 m)

Population (2020)
  - City: 25,949
  - Density: 1,516.5/sq mi (585.54/km^{2})
  - Metro: 1,034,123 (US: 54th)
- Time zone: UTC-6 (Central (CST))
  - Summer (DST): UTC-5 (CDT)
- ZIP code: 74037
- Area codes: 539/918
- FIPS code: 40-37800
- GNIS feature ID: 1094209
- Website: www.jenks.com

Jenks is a city in Tulsa County, Oklahoma, United States, and a suburb of Tulsa, in the northeastern part of the state. It is situated between the Arkansas River and U.S. Route 75. Jenks is one of the fastest-growing cities in Oklahoma. The city's population was 16,924 in the 2010 census, but by 2020, this had grown to 25,949.

== History ==
Jenks began in 1904 as a community site established by the Midland Valley Railroad between Tulsa and Muskogee, alongside the Arkansas River. Though the river could only be utilized by shallow draft steamboats while the water level was up, these two transportation routes proved vital to Jenks' early development.

Jenks was named after William Henry Jenks the owner and director of the Midland Valley Railroad. According to a 1957 article in the Tulsa Tribune, an agent for the townsite company was told by the railroad home office to name a town for the director.

The town was officially platted on July 15, 1905. Also in 1905, a major petroleum discovery was made, further bolstering the economy of the area. The "Glenn Pool" oil well and subsequent oil claims brought many business people to the general area. In 1906, many oil depots (also known as "tank farms") were constructed in Jenks. By the time of statehood, Jenks had 465 inhabitants.

As oil production waned, tank farms were dismantled, and agriculture became once again a major contributor to the Jenks economy. The economy of the area was further improved in the 1920s when many Bulgarian families immigrated to the area to farm. These immigrants established many vegetable farms.

From 1904 through the 1950s, Jenks experienced many floods from the overflow of the Arkansas River and Polecat Creek. In the 1920s and 1930s, floods were severe. During one flood in the late 1920s, the water was so deep that it completely covered every building but the roof of the three-story-high school. Everyone was evacuated except two men and one woman. They had one shotgun, one small boat, food and a tent on top of the school. They guarded the remains of Jenks for several weeks until the water receded. In 1948, the U.S. Army Corps of Engineers built a levee around Jenks, and the community subsequently grew as a result of the increased safety and security. There was another threat of severe flooding in 1986, when severe rainstorms upstream along the Arkansas River forced the Corps of Engineers to release as much as 300,000 cubic feet per second from the Keystone Dam into the river. This caused a mandatory evacuation order in Jenks and several other river communities.

Jenks has served as a river crossing point via several bridges over the past century. In 1910, a single-lane bridge was built and strengthened the economic success of the area. The year 1948 saw the construction of a replacement two-lane bridge, which still stands today and now serves as a pedestrian crossing between the Riverwalk and the South Tulsa River Parks. The original 1910 bridge was destroyed and all that is left are a few columns and pieces of metal that are seen when the water level is low. A four-lane bridge was built in 1996.

The current High School building was built in 1960-61 and has undergone three major additions. The United States Census of 1970 placed the population of the city at 1,990 and there were approximately 1100 students in public school.

In the 1970s, the Tulsa water system was expanded into Jenks. That decade also saw the construction of a nearby Public Service of Oklahoma gas-fired electric power plant. These developments improved the infrastructure of the area and helped the economy.

In the 1980s, Kimberly-Clark built a manufacturing facility that provides many jobs for the area to this day.

A citizen-led initiative to restore abandoned infrastructure in The Ten District was started in 2024.

== Geography ==
According to the United States Census Bureau, the city has a total area of 17.73 square miles (45.9 km^{2}), of which 17.13 square miles (44.4 km^{2}) is land and 0.6 square miles (1.6 km^{2}) (3.69%) is water.

== Demographics ==
Historical population
Census	Pop.	Note	%±
1910	290		—
1920	1,508		420.0%
1930	1,110		−26.4%
1940	1,026		−7.6%
1950	1,037		1.1%
1960	1,734		67.2%
1970	2,685		54.8%
1980	5,876		118.8%
1990	7,493		27.5%
2000	9,577		27.8%
2010	16,924		76.7%
2020	25,949		53.3%
2023 (est.)	27,553		6.2%
Sources: 2020; U.S. Decennial Census

=== 2020 census ===
As of the 2020 census, Jenks had a population of 25,949. The median age was 34.9 years, 31.5% of residents were under the age of 18, and 11.1% of residents were 65 years of age or older. For every 100 females there were 96.7 males, and for every 100 females age 18 and over there were 92.9 males age 18 and over.

98.8% of residents lived in urban areas, while 1.2% lived in rural areas.

There were 8,725 households in Jenks, of which 47.3% had children under the age of 18 living in them. Of all households, 64.3% were married-couple households, 11.7% were households with a male householder and no spouse or partner present, and 20.1% were households with a female householder and no spouse or partner present. About 17.4% of all households were made up of individuals and 6.8% had someone living alone who was 65 years of age or older.

There were 9,279 housing units, of which 6.0% were vacant. Among occupied housing units, 77.4% were owner-occupied and 22.6% were renter-occupied. The homeowner vacancy rate was 1.7% and the rental vacancy rate was 8.6%.

Racial composition as of the 2020 census
Race	Percent
White	66.4%
Black or African American	3.2%
American Indian and Alaska Native	5.5%
Asian	9.7%
Native Hawaiian and Other Pacific Islander	<0.1%
Some other race	2.2%
Two or more races	13.1%
Hispanic or Latino (of any race)	6.9%

=== 2010 census ===
As of the 2010 census, there were 16,924 people, 5,954 households, and 4,753 families residing in the city. The population density was 988.1 inhabitants per square mile (381.5/km^{2}). There were 6,395 housing units. The racial makeup of the city was 82.8% White, 2.8% African American, 5.5% Native American, 2.3% Asian, 0.002% Pacific Islander, 1.8% from other races, and 4.8% from two or more races. Hispanic or Latino of any race were 4.8% of the population.

=== 2000 census ===
As of the census of 2000, there were 9,557 people, 3,451 households, and 2,757 families residing in the city. The population density was 666.2 inhabitants per square mile (257.2/km^{2}). There were 3,592 housing units at an average density of 250.4 per square mile (96.7/km^{2}). The racial makeup of the city was 87.39% European American, 1.58% African American, 4.74% Native American, 0.81% Asian, 0.02% Pacific Islander, 1.73% from other races, and 3.74% from two or more races. Hispanic or Latino of any race were 4.12% of the population.

There were 3,451 households, out of which 43.1% had children under the age of 18 living with them, 66.0% were married couples living together, 9.9% had a female householder with no husband present, and 20.1% were non-families. 18.1% of all households were made up of individuals, and 7.1% had someone living alone who was 65 years of age or older. The average household size was 2.74 and the average family size was 3.12.

In the city, the population was spread out, with 29.7% under the age of 18, 6.6% from 18 to 24, 31.5% from 25 to 44, 23.0% from 45 to 64, and 9.1% who were 65 years of age or older. The median age was 35 years. For every 100 females, there were 96.7 males. For every 100 females age 18 and over, there were 90.0 males.

The median income for a household in the city was $54,637, and the median income for a family was $61,050. Males had a median income of $42,148 versus $28,419 for females. The per capita income for the city was $22,804. About 2.6% of families and 4.6% of the population were below the poverty line, including 6.7% of those under the age of 18 and 4.9% of those age 65 or over.

== Economy ==
In 1958, Richard Lloyd Jones Jr. Airport opened for business just outside Jenks. This airport is the official reliever for Tulsa International Airport and is one of the busiest in the state. It serves commercial and private air travel throughout the Tulsa area and has helped stimulate the growth of Jenks' economy.

Jenks is home to the headquarters of many small and large businesses, including Kimberly Clark Corporation, Green Country Energy, Public Service Company, Tulsa Winch, Continental Wire Cloth, and Tedford Insurance. Jenks is also the headquarters of First Oklahoma Bank, which first began construction on its eight-story building in December 2012.

== Arts and culture ==
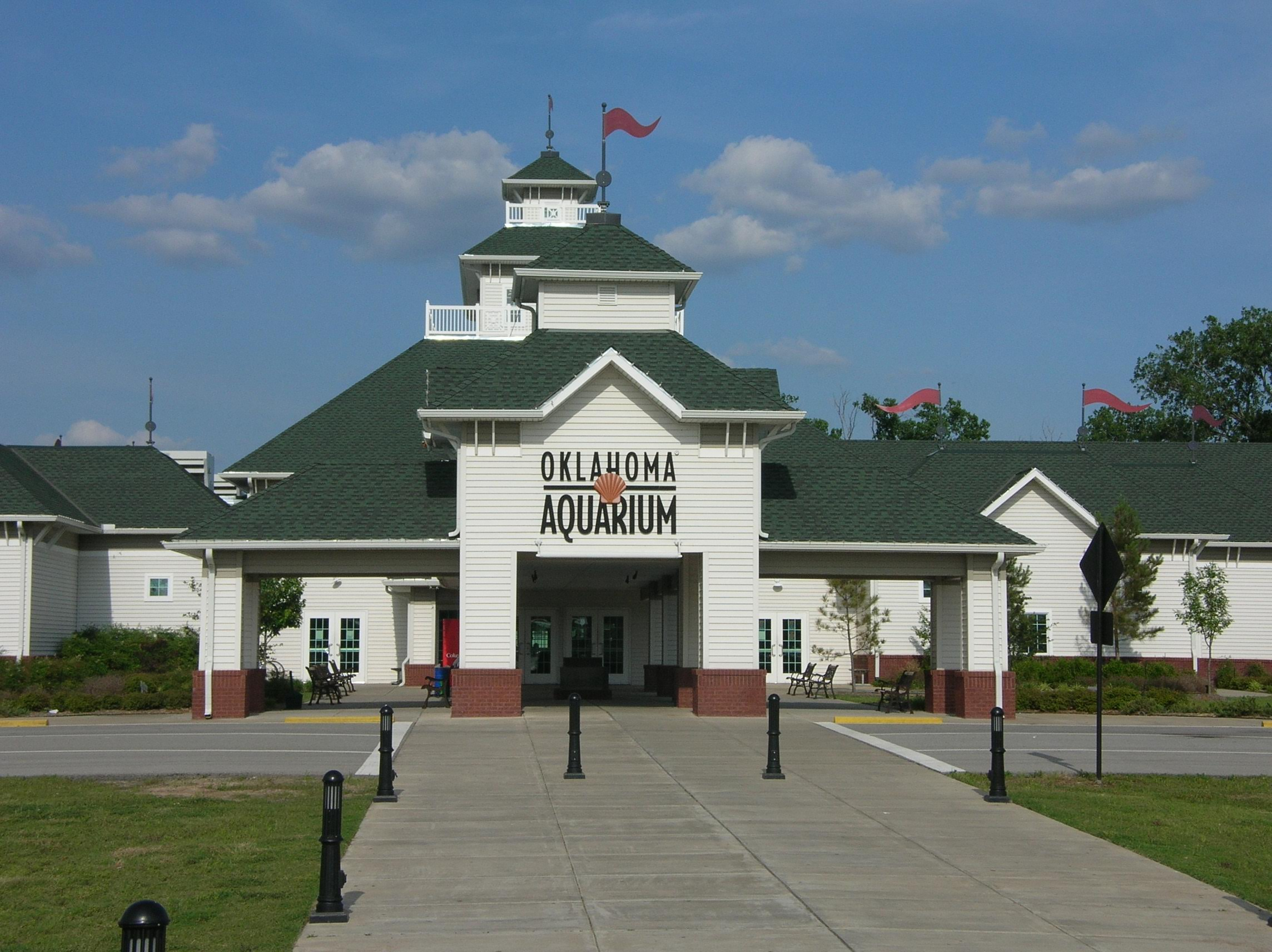
Oklahoma Aquarium in Jenks

The Oklahoma Aquarium is located in Jenks.

== Government ==
Jenks has a council-manager form of government.

== Education ==
On November 22, 2005, President George W. Bush and Commerce Secretary Carlos Gutierrez announced Jenks Public Schools as a recipient of the 2005 Malcolm Baldrige National Quality Award, the nation's highest Presidential honor for quality and organizational performance excellence.

The Jenks School District is one of the largest in the state and encompasses significant portions of southwest Tulsa, while many of the Jenks schools are located within the city of Tulsa.

Most of Jenks is in Jenks Public Schools. Some parts are in Bixby Public Schools and Glenpool Public Schools.

== Notable people ==
- R. Perry Beaver, head football coach at Jenks High School 1977–1990, principal chief of Muscogee (Creek) Nation 1996–2003
- Jennifer Berry, Miss America 2006
- Jim Bridenstine, former United States Representative for Oklahoma's 1st congressional district and current administrator of National Aeronautics and Space Administration.
- Trey Callaway, screenwriter and television producer
- Rocky Calmus, football player, Butkus Award winner, NFL linebacker
- Brad Carson, former member of U.S. House of Representatives, director of National Energy Policy Institute at University of Tulsa
- Simon Curtis, actor and musician
- Phillip Dillard, NFL linebacker
- Josh Johnson, Major League Baseball pitcher for San Diego Padres
- Tyrel Lacey, professional soccer goalkeeper
- Ben Lamb, 2011 World Series of Poker Player of the Year
- Danielle Laney, bronze medalist in Taekwondo at the 1992 Summer Olympics
- Sean Mahan, NFL center for Tampa Bay Buccaneers
- Garrett Mills, NFL player for Minnesota Vikings
- Brian Nhira, singer, contestant on The Voice
- Tyler Ott, long snapper for the Baltimore Ravens
- Brian Presley, actor
- Ryan Tedder, lead singer of OneRepublic, attended Jenks schools until senior year in high school
- Colonel Theodore S. Westhusing, West Point professor of English and Philosophy
- Jerry Wisne, NFL player for Chicago Bears

== See also ==
- Jenks High School
