= Jenks Public Schools =

School district in Oklahoma

Coordinates: 36.024619°N 95.96829°W

Location
- 205 East B Street; Jenks, Oklahoma 74037 Tulsa, Oklahoma United States

District information
- Type: Public, Primary, Secondary, Co-Educational
- Motto: A Tradition of Excellence with a Vision for Tomorrow.
- Grades: PreK-12
- Established: 1908
- Superintendent: Dr. Stacey Butterfield
- Schools: 10
- Budget: $97,277,577

Students and staff
- Students: 12,120
- Staff: 1,868

Other information
- Website: www.jenksps.org

Jenks Public Schools is a PreK-12 public school system located in Jenks, Oklahoma.

Located just south of Tulsa, Jenks Public Schools now encompasses over 40 square miles and serves more than 12,000 students at its ten school sites. It is the eleventh largest public school district in Oklahoma.

Dr. Stacey Butterfield was named Superintendent of Jenks Public Schools in 2013; she previously served as Assistant Superintendent, Deputy Superintendent, and in other roles in the district.

The school district was established in 1907 and classes were initially held in a two-room building that was intended to be a cheese factory. The first graduating class had 4 students.

Jenks Public Schools was a Malcolm Baldrige National Quality Award recipient in 2016.

The Jenks football program has won 18 state championships, and its rivalry with Union High School has been named as one of the top high school football rivalries in the nation.

== Area ==
The district, mostly in Tulsa County, includes most of Jenks and portions of Tulsa. It extends into Creek County.

== School Sites ==
Jenks Public School is composed of 10 school sites:

- East Elementary (pre-K to 4th grade)
- Northwest Elementary (pre-K to 4th grade)
- Southeast Elementary (pre-K to 4th grade)
- West Elementary (pre-K to 4th grade)
- East Intermediate (5th and 6th grade)
- West Intermediate (5th and 6th grade)
- Middle School (7th and 8th grade)
- Freshman Academy (9th grade)
- Jenks High School (10th to 12th grade)
- Alternative Center (9th to 12th Grade)
