= 1996 Green Bay Packers season =

NFL team season (won Super Bowl)

- Owner: Green Bay Packers, Inc.
- General manager: Ron Wolf
- President: Bob Harlan
- Head coach: Mike Holmgren
- Offensive coordinator: Sherman Lewis
- Defensive coordinator: Fritz Shurmur
- Home stadium: Lambeau Field

Results
- Record: 13–3
- Division place: 1st NFC Central
- Playoffs: Won Divisional Playoffs (vs. 49ers) 35–14; Won NFC Championship (vs. Panthers) 30–13; Won Super Bowl XXXI (vs. Patriots) 35–21
- All-Pros: 3: QB Brett Favre (1st team); S LeRoy Butler (1st team); DE Reggie White (2nd team)
- Pro Bowlers: 5: QB Brett Favre; TE Keith Jackson; C Frank Winters; DE Reggie White; SS LeRoy Butler

The 1996 season was the Green Bay Packers' 76th season in the National Football League (NFL), their 78th overall and their fifth under head coach Mike Holmgren. The franchise won its third Super Bowl and league-record 12th NFL Championship. The Packers posted a league-best 13–3 regular season win-loss record, going 8–0 at home and 5–3 on the road. It was the first time since 1962 that the team went undefeated at home. Additionally, the Packers had the NFL's highest-scoring offense (456) and allowed the fewest points on defense (210). Green Bay was the first team to accomplish both feats in the same season since the undefeated 1972 Miami Dolphins. They finished the season with the number one offense, defense, and special teams. They also set a then NFL record for the fewest touchdowns allowed in a 16-game season, with 19. The Packers also allowed the fewest yards in the NFL and set a record for punt return yardage. Brett Favre won his second straight MVP award while also throwing for a career-high and league-leading 39 touchdown passes.

In the postseason, the Packers defeated the San Francisco 49ers in the divisional round and the Carolina Panthers in the NFC Championship Game. Green Bay beat the New England Patriots in Super Bowl XXXI to win their third Super Bowl and twelfth NFL Championship.

In 2007, the 1996 Packers were ranked as the 16th greatest Super Bowl champions on the NFL Network's documentary series America's Game: The Super Bowl Champions, with team commentary from Brett Favre, Mike Holmgren, and Desmond Howard, and narrated by Kevin Bacon. The 1996 Packers were ranked 6th-greatest Super Bowl team of all time by a similar panel done by ESPN and released in 2007. Later, they ranked #20 on the 100 greatest teams of all time presented by the NFL on its 100th anniversary. As of 2023, the Packers are the only team since the implementation of the salary cap to score the most points and allow the fewest in the regular season.

== Offseason ==
Additions	Subtractions
WR Don Beebe (Panthers)	QB Ty Detmer (Eagles)
WR Desmond Howard (Jaguars)	WR Mark Ingram Sr. (Eagles)
FS Eugene Robinson (Seahawks)	LB Joe Kelly (Eagles)
DT Santana Dotson (Buccaneers)	LB Fred Strickland (Cowboys)
	FS George Teague (Cowboys)
	DT John Jurkovic (Jaguars)

=== NFL draft ===
1996 Green Bay Packers draft
Round	Pick	Player	Position	College	Notes
1	27	John Michels	Offensive tackle	USC	
2	56	Derrick Mayes	Wide receiver	Notre Dame	
3	90	Mike Flanagan *	Center	UCLA	
3	93	Tyrone Williams	Cornerback	Nebraska	
4	123	Chris Darkins	Running back	Minnesota	
6	208	Marco Rivera *	Guard	Penn State	
7	240	Kyle Wachholtz	Quarterback	USC	
7	252	Keith McKenzie	Defensive end	Ball State	
Made roster * Made at least one Pro Bowl during career

=== Undrafted free agents ===
1996 undrafted free agents of note
Player	Position	College
Brad Keeney	Defensive tackle	The Citadel
Eric Matthews	Wide receiver	Indiana
Troy Stark	Offensive tackle	Georgia

== Staff ==
1996 Green Bay Packers staff
Front office: President/chief executive officer – Bob Harlan; Executive vice president/general manager – Ron Wolf; Director of pro personnel – Ted Thompson; Director of college scouting – John Math; Pro personnel assistant – Reggie McKenzie; Head coaches: Head coach – Mike Holmgren; Offensive coaches: Offensive coordinator – Sherman Lewis; Quarterbacks – Marty Mornhinweg; Running backs – Harry Sydney; Wide receivers – Gil Haskell; Offensive line – Tom Lovat; Assistant offensive line/tight ends – Andy Reid	Defensive coaches: Defensive coordinator – Fritz Shurmur; Defensive line – Larry Brooks; Linebackers – Jim Lind; Defensive backs/secondary – Bob Valesente; Defensive assistant/quality control – Johnny Holland; Special teams coaches: Special teams – Nolan Cromwell; Strength and conditioning: Strength and conditioning – Kent Johnston; Assistant strength and conditioning – Barry Rubin

== Roster ==
1996 Green Bay Packers roster
Quarterbacks (QB): 4 Brett Favre; 9 Jim McMahon; 18 Doug Pederson; Running backs (RB): 34 Edgar Bennett; 30 William Henderson FB; 32 Travis Jervey; 27 Calvin Jones; 25 Dorsey Levens; Wide receivers (WR): 82 Don Beebe; 86 Antonio Freeman; 81 Desmond Howard; 80 Derrick Mayes; 85 Terry Mickens; 84 Andre Rison; Tight ends (TE): 89 Mark Chmura; 88 Keith Jackson; 83 Jeff Thomason	Offensive linemen (OL): 68 Gary Brown OT; 67 Jeff Dellenbach C; 72 Earl Dotson OT; 65 Lindsay Knapp G; 77 John Michels OT; 62 Marco Rivera G; 73 Aaron Taylor G; 63 Adam Timmerman G; 64 Bruce Wilkerson OT; 52 Frank Winters C; Defensive linemen (DL): 93 Gilbert Brown DT; 91 Shannon Clavelle DE; 71 Santana Dotson DT; 90 Darius Holland DT; 96 Sean Jones DE; 94 Bob Kuberski DT; 92 Reggie White DE; 98 Gabe Wilkins DE	Linebackers (LB): 54 Ron Cox OLB; 55 Bernardo Harris MLB; 56 Lamont Hollinquest OLB; 53 George Koonce MLB; 95 Keith McKenzie OLB; 59 Wayne Simmons OLB; 51 Brian Williams OLB; Defensive backs (DB): 36 LeRoy Butler SS; 33 Doug Evans CB; 40 Chris Hayes SS; 28 Roderick Mullen SS; 21 Craig Newsome CB; 39 Mike Prior FS; 41 Eugene Robinson FS; 46 Michael Robinson CB; 37 Tyrone Williams CB; Special teams (ST): 17 Craig Hentrich P; 13 Chris Jacke K	Practice squad: 2 Eric Matthews WR; 7 Kyle Wachholtz QB; 19 Bill Schroeder WR; 42 Buster Owens CB; 57 John Solomon OLB; 74 Walter Scott DE; Reserve: 87 Robert Brooks WR (IR); 43 James Bostic RB (IR); 16 Rob Carpenter WR (IR); 44 Chris Darkins RB (IR); 23 Matthew Dorsett CB (IR); 58 Mike Flanagan C (IR); 75 Ken Ruettgers OT (IR); 38 Brian Satterfield RB (IR); Rookies in italics 53 active, 6 reserve, 5 practice squad

== 1996 Green Bay Packers season ==
=== Preseason ===
Week	Date	Opponent	Result	Record	Game site	Game recap
1	August 2	New England Patriots	W 24–7	1–0	Lambeau Field	Recap
2	August 11	Pittsburgh Steelers	W 24–17	2–0	Lambeau Field	Recap
3	August 17	at Baltimore Ravens	W 17–15	3–0	Memorial Stadium	Recap
4	August 24	at Indianapolis Colts	L 6–20	3–1	RCA Dome	Recap

=== Regular season ===
Week	Date	Opponent	Result	Record	Game site	Recap
1	September 1	at Tampa Bay Buccaneers	W 34–3	1–0	Houlihan's Stadium	Recap
2	September 9	Philadelphia Eagles	W 39–13	2–0	Lambeau Field	Recap
3	September 15	San Diego Chargers	W 42–10	3–0	Lambeau Field	Recap
4	September 22	at Minnesota Vikings	L 21–30	3–1	Hubert H. Humphrey Metrodome	Recap
5	September 29	at Seattle Seahawks	W 31–10	4–1	Kingdome	Recap
6	October 6	at Chicago Bears	W 37–6	5–1	Soldier Field	Recap
7	October 14	San Francisco 49ers	W 23–20 (OT)	6–1	Lambeau Field	Recap
8	Bye					
9	October 27	Tampa Bay Buccaneers	W 13–7	7–1	Lambeau Field	Recap
10	November 3	Detroit Lions	W 28–18	8–1	Lambeau Field	Recap
11	November 10	at Kansas City Chiefs	L 20–27	8–2	Arrowhead Stadium	Recap
12	November 18	at Dallas Cowboys	L 6–21	8–3	Texas Stadium	Recap
13	November 24	at St. Louis Rams	W 24–9	9–3	Trans World Dome	Recap
14	December 1	Chicago Bears	W 28–17	10–3	Lambeau Field	Recap
15	December 8	Denver Broncos	W 41–6	11–3	Lambeau Field	Recap
16	December 15	at Detroit Lions	W 31–3	12–3	Pontiac Silverdome	Recap
17	December 22	Minnesota Vikings	W 38–10	13–3	Lambeau Field	Recap

=== Postseason ===
Round	Date	Opponent (seed)	Result	Record	Venue	Recap
Wild Card	First-round bye					
Divisional	January 4, 1997	San Francisco 49ers (4)	W 35–14	1–0	Lambeau Field	Recap
NFC Championship	January 12, 1997	Carolina Panthers (2)	W 30–13	2–0	Lambeau Field	Recap
Super Bowl XXXI	January 26, 1997	New England Patriots (A2)	W 35–21	3–0	Louisiana Superdome	Recap

=== Game summaries ===
==== Week 1: at. Tampa Bay Buccaneers ====
Team	1	2	3	4	Total
• Packers	10	14	10	0	34
Buccaneers	0	3	0	0	3

- Date: September 1
- Location: Houlihan's Stadium
- Game start: 4:00 p.m. EST
- Game attendance: 54,102
- Game weather: 81 °F (27 °C); wind 6 mph (9.7 km/h)
- Referee: Walt Coleman
- Television network: Fox

Scoring summary
Q1	GB	Jacke 23-yard field goal	GB 3–0
Q1	GB	Jackson 1 yard pass from Favre (Jacke kick)	GB 10–0
Q2	TB	Husted 48-yard field goal	GB 10–3
Q2	GB	Jackson 4-yard pass from Favre (Jacke kick)	GB 17–3
Q2	GB	Jackson 51-yard pass from Favre (Jacke kick)	GB 24–3
Q3	GB	Jacke 40-yard field goal	GB 27–3
Q3	GB	Levens 1 yard pass from Favre (Jacke kick)	GB 34–3

==== Week 3: vs San Diego Chargers ====
Week Three: San Diego Chargers at Green Bay Packers – Game summary

Quarter	1	2	3	4	Total
Chargers	3	0	0	7	10
Packers	7	14	7	14	42

at Lambeau Field, Green Bay, Wisconsin

- Date: September 15
- Game time: 12:00 p.m. CDT
- Game weather: 55 °F (12.8 °C), relative humidity 80%, wind 9 mph
- Game attendance: 60,584
- Referee: Howard Roe
- TV announcers (NBC): Charlie Jones and Randy Cross
- Box score

Game information

First quarter

- GB – Edgar Bennett 10-yard run (Chris Jacke kick), 9:51. Packers 7–0. Drive: 6 plays, 55 yards, 3:31.
- SDG – John Carney 43-yard field goal, 1:05. Packers 7–3. Drive: 10 plays, 55 yards, 5:06.

Second quarter

- GB – Antonio Freeman 19-yard pass from Brett Favre (Chris Jacke kick), 12:52. Packers 14–3. Drive: 6 plays, 80 yards, 3:13.
- GB – William Henderson 8-yard pass from Brett Favre (Chris Jacke kick), 1:13. Packers 21–3. Drive: 17 plays, 88 yards, 9:24.

Third quarter

- GB – Keith Jackson 7-yard pass from Brett Favre (Chris Jacke kick), 1:52. Packers 28–3. Drive: 9 plays, 50 yards, 5:27.

Fourth quarter

- SDG – Tony Martin 9-yard pass from Stan Humphries (John Carney kick), 8:16. Packers 28–10. Drive: 4 plays, 26 yards, 1:18.
- GB – LeRoy Butler 90-yard interception return (Chris Jacke kick), 6:31. Packers 35–10.
- GB – Desmond Howard 65-yard punt return (Chris Jacke kick), 4:59. Packers 42–10.

Top passers

- SDG – Stan Humphries – 16/31, 130 yards, TD, 2 INT
- GB – Brett Favre – 22/33, 231 yards, 3 TD, INT

Top rushers

- SDG – Leonard Russell – 9 rushes, 27 yards
- GB – Edgar Bennett – 13 rushes, 65 yards, TD

Top receivers

- SDG – Tony Martin – 3 receptions, 38 yards, TD
- GB – Robert Brooks – 8 receptions, 108 yards

==== Week 5: at. Seattle Seahawks ====
Week Five: Green Bay Packers at Seattle Seahawks – Game summary

Quarter	1	2	3	4	Total
Packers	10	7	7	7	31
Seahawks	0	7	3	0	10

at Kingdome, Seattle

- Date: September 29
- Game time: 1:04 pm local
- Game weather: indoors
- Game attendance: 59,973
- Referee: Ron Blum
- TV announcers (Fox): Kevin Harlan, Jerry Glanville
- Gamebook

Game information

First quarter

- GB – Antonio Freeman 13-yard pass from Brett Favre (Chris Jacke kick), 4:36 (GB 7–0)
- GB – Chris Jacke 36-yard field goal, 0:34 (GB 10–0)

Second quarter

- GB – Dorsey Levens 4-yard pass from Brett Favre (Chris Jacke kick), 3:54 (GB 17–0)
- SEA – Chris Warren 37-yard run (Todd Peterson kick), 1:56 (GB 17–7)

Third quarter

- GB – Keith Jackson 10-yard pass from Brett Favre (Chris Jacke kick), 8:24 (GB 24–7)
- SEA – Todd Peterson 44-yard field goal, 5:35 (GB 24–10)

Fourth quarter

- GB – Antonio Freeman 4-yard pass from Brett Favre (Chris Jacke kick), 9:50 (GB 31–10)

Top passers

- GB – Brett Favre: 20/34, 209 yds, 4 TD
- SEA – Rick Mirer: 10/30, 156 yds, 4 int

Top rushers

- GB – Edgar Bennett: 22 car, 94 yds
- SEA – Chris Warren: 18 car, 103 yds, 1 TD

Top receivers

- GB – Antonio Freeman: 7 rec, 108 yds, 2 TD
- SEA – Mike Pritchard: 2 rec, 54 yds

Team – pass – rush – total – to

- GB – 202 – 142 – 344 – 0
- SEA – 170 – 159 – 329 – 5

=== Standings ===
NFC Central
	W	L	T	PCT	PF	PA	STK
^{(1)} Green Bay Packers	13	3	0	.813	456	210	W5
^{(6)} Minnesota Vikings	9	7	0	.563	298	315	L1
Chicago Bears	7	9	0	.438	283	305	L1
Tampa Bay Buccaneers	6	10	0	.375	221	293	W1
Detroit Lions	5	11	0	.313	302	368	L5

== Season statistical leaders ==
Brett Favre broke the Packers single-season record for touchdown passes by throwing 39.

- Passing yards: Brett Favre 3,899 yards
- Passing touchdowns: Brett Favre 39 TD
- Rushing yards: Edgar Bennett, 899 yards
- Rushing touchdowns: Dorsey Levens, 5 TD
- Receiving yards: Antonio Freeman, 933 yards
- Receiving touchdowns: Keith Jackson, 10 TD
- Points: Chris Jacke, 114 points
- Kickoff return yards: Desmond Howard, 460 yards
- Punt return yards: Desmond Howard, 875 yards
- Tackles: George Koonce, 97 tackles
- Sacks: Reggie White, 8.5 sacks
- Interceptions: Eugene Robinson, 6 interceptions

== Playoffs ==
=== NFC Divisional Playoff vs. San Francisco 49ers ===
NFC Divisional Playoff: San Francisco 49ers vs. Green Bay Packers – Game summary

Quarter	1	2	3	4	Total
49ers	0	7	7	0	14
Packers	14	7	7	7	35

at Lambeau Field, Green Bay, Wisconsin

- Date: January 4, 1997
- Game time: 11:30 a.m
- Referee: Dick Hantak

Green Bay was able to win going away on a cold damp day at Lambeau Field. With the weather turning the field into a muddy mess both offenses struggled. San Francisco was able to keep pace offensively and defensively for most of the game, with the score 21–14 in favor of Green Bay in the third quarter, but special teams were decisively dominated by the Packers. Penalties also played a factor as San Francisco had 6 for 42 yards, while Green Bay only had 1 for 5.

A muffed kickoff by Green Bay set up a 49ers touchdown, but Green Bay's Desmond Howard returned two kicks for large gains, including one touchdown. The final score was Green Bay 35–14.

=== NFC Championship Game vs. Carolina Panthers ===
NFC Championship Game: Carolina Panthers vs. Green Bay Packers – Game summary

Quarter	1	2	3	4	Total
Panthers	7	3	3	0	13
Packers	0	17	10	3	30

at Lambeau Field, Green Bay, Wisconsin

- Date: January 12, 1997
- Game time: 11:30 a.m
- Referee: Bob McElwee

=== Super Bowl XXXI vs. New England Patriots ===
Super Bowl XXXI: New England Patriots vs. Green Bay Packers – Game summary

Quarter	1	2	3	4	Total
Patriots	14	0	7	0	21
Packers	10	17	8	0	35

at Louisiana Superdome

- Date: January 26, 1997
- Game time: 5:30 p.m.
- Referee: Gerald Austin

The Packers win their first championship since 1967. Desmond Howard is named the Super Bowl MVP, as he accumulated 244 total yards worth of returns (kick and punt) including a 99-yard kickoff return for a touchdown in the 3rd quarter. Patriots Quarterback Drew Bledsoe threw 4 interceptions while Brett Favre threw for 246 yards and 2 touchdowns and ran another one in.

== Awards and records ==
- Brett Favre, club record, most touchdown passes in one season, 39
- Brett Favre, NFC leader, touchdown passes (39)
- Brett Favre, NFC leader, passing yardage (3,899)
- Brett Favre, NFL MVP
- Brett Favre, Bert Bell Award
- Brett Favre, Offense, UPI NFC Player of the Year
- Brett Favre, NFC Pro Bowl selection
- Brett Favre, All-Pro selection
- Brett Favre, Best NFL Player ESPY Award
- Desmond Howard, Super Bowl XXXI MVP
- Reggie White, NFC Pro Bowl selection
- Keith Jackson, NFC Pro Bowl selection
