= 1995 Green Bay Packers season =

NFL team season

- Owner: Green Bay Packers, Inc.
- General manager: Ron Wolf
- President: Bob Harlan
- Head coach: Mike Holmgren
- Offensive coordinator: Sherman Lewis
- Defensive coordinator: Fritz Shurmur
- Home stadium: Lambeau Field

Results
- Record: 11–5
- Division place: 1st NFC Central
- Playoffs: Won Wild Card Playoffs (vs. Falcons) 37–20; Won Divisional Playoffs (at 49ers) 27–17; Lost NFC Championship (at Cowboys) 27–38
- Pro Bowlers: QB Brett Favre; TE Mark Chmura; DE Reggie White

The 1995 season was the Green Bay Packers' 75th season in the National Football League (NFL), their 77th overall. The Packers finished with an 11–5 record in the regular season and won the NFC Central, their first division title since 1982. In the playoffs, the Packers defeated the Atlanta Falcons 37–20 at home and the defending champion San Francisco 49ers 27–17 on the road before losing to the Dallas Cowboys 38–27 in the NFC Championship Game. Packers' quarterback Brett Favre was named the NFL's Most Valuable Player, the first of three straight MVP awards he would win. This was the first season that the Packers played home games exclusively at Lambeau Field, after playing part of their home slate at Milwaukee County Stadium since 1953. After losing their home opener to St. Louis, the Packers would win an NFL-record 25 consecutive home games between the rest of 1995 and early in 1998.

== Offseason ==
Additions	Subtractions
QB Jim McMahon (Browns)	OLB Bryce Paup (Bills)
WR Mark Ingram Sr. (Dolphins)	DT Don Davey (Jaguars)
LB Joe Kelly (Rams)	SS Tim Hauck (Broncos)
TE Keith Jackson (Dolphins)	QB Mark Brunell (Jaguars)
QB T. J. Rubley (Rams)	TE Ed West (Eagles)
TE Jeff Thomason (Bengals)	DT Matt Brock (Jets)
C Mike Arthur (Patriots)	CB Terrell Buckley (Dolphins)
LS Mike Bartrum (Chiefs)	
WR Milt Stegall (Bengals)	

=== 1995 expansion draft ===
Green Bay Packers selected during the expansion draft
Round	Overall	Name	Position	Expansion team
6	11	Mark Williams	Linebacker	Jacksonville Jaguars
21	41	Marcus Wilson	Running back	Jacksonville Jaguars
27	53	Reggie Cobb	Running back	Jacksonville Jaguars

=== NFL draft ===
With their third pick (66th overall) in the 1995 NFL draft, the Packers selected future All-Pro fullback William Henderson, a player who would remain with the Packers for over 13 seasons.

1995 Green Bay Packers draft
Round	Pick	Player	Position	College	Notes
1	32	Craig Newsome	Cornerback	Arizona State	
3	65	Darius Holland	Defensive tackle	Colorado	
3	66	William Henderson *	Fullback	North Carolina	
3	73	Brian Williams	Linebacker	Southern California	
3	90	Antonio Freeman *	Wide receiver	Virginia Tech	
4	117	Jeff Miller	Offensive tackle	Mississippi	
5	160	Jay Barker	Quarterback	Alabama	
5	170	Travis Jervey *	Running back	Citadel	
6	173	Charlie Simmons	Wide receiver	Georgia Tech	
7	230	Adam Timmerman *	Guard	South Dakota State	
Made roster * Made at least one Pro Bowl during career

=== Undrafted free agents ===
1995 undrafted free agents of note
Player	Position	College
Lee Becton	Running back	Notre Dame
Matthew Dorsett	Cornerback	Southern
Stephen Henley	Linebacker	Mankato State
Joe Nedney	Kicker	San Jose State
Oscar Wilson	Defensive tackle	Cal State Northridge

== Staff ==
1995 Green Bay Packers staff
Front office: President and chief executive officer – Bob Harlan; Executive vice-president and general manager – Ron Wolf; Vice-president of administration and Chief Financial Officer – Mike Reinfeldt; Director of pro personnel – Ted Thompson; Director of college scouting – John Math; Pro personnel assistant – Reggie McKenzie; Pro personnel assistant – John Schneider; Head coaches: Head coach – Mike Holmgren; Offensive coaches: Offensive coordinator – Sherman Lewis; Quarterbacks – Steve Mariucci; Running backs – Harry Sydney; Wide receivers – Gil Haskell; Offensive line – Tom Lovat; Assistant offensive line/tight ends – Andy Reid; Offensive Assistant/quality control – Marty Mornhinweg	Defensive coaches: Defensive coordinator – Fritz Shurmur; Defensive line – Larry Brooks; Linebackers – Jim Lind; Defensive backs/secondary – Bob Valesente; Defensive assistant/quality control – Johnny Holland; Special teams coaches: Special teams – Nolan Cromwell; Strength and conditioning: Strength and conditioning – Kent Johnston; Assistant strength and conditioning – Barry Rubin

== Roster ==
1995 Green Bay Packers roster
Quarterbacks (QB): 4 Brett Favre; 9 Jim McMahon; 18 Doug Pederson; Running backs (RB): 34 Edgar Bennett; 30 William Henderson FB; 32 Travis Jervey; 25 Dorsey Levens; 29 Marcus Wilson; Wide receivers (WR): 84 Bucky Brooks; 87 Robert Brooks; 86 Antonio Freeman; 82 Mark Ingram; 80 Charles Jordan; 85 Terry Mickens; 81 Anthony Morgan; Tight ends (TE): 89 Mark Chmura; 88 Keith Jackson; 83 Jeff Thomason	Offensive linemen (OL): 50 Mike Arthur C; 71 Gary Brown LT; 72 Earl Dotson RT; 76 Harry Galbreath G; 65 Lindsay Knapp G; 75 Ken Ruettgers LT; 73 Aaron Taylor G; 63 Adam Timmerman G; 52 Frank Winters C; Defensive linemen (DL): 93 Gilbert Brown DT; 91 Shannon Clavelle DE; 90 Darius Holland DT; 96 Sean Jones DE; 64 John Jurkovic DT; 94 Bob Kuberski DT; 97 Matt LaBounty DE; 92 Reggie White DE; 98 Gabe Wilkins DE	Linebackers (LB): 54 Bernardo Harris MLB; 57 Joe Kelly MLB; 53 George Koonce OLB; 59 Wayne Simmons OLB; 55 Fred Strickland MLB; 51 Brian Williams OLB; Defensive backs (DB): 36 LeRoy Butler SS; 45 Keith Crawford CB; 23 Matthew Dorsett CB; 33 Doug Evans CB; 22 Lenny McGill CB; 28 Roderick Mullen CB; 21 Craig Newsome CB; 39 Mike Prior FS; 31 George Teague FS; Special teams (ST): 17 Craig Hentrich P; 13 Chris Jacke K	Practice squad: -- Robert Bass OLB; 46 Reggie Holt S; 10 Mike McCoy QB; 20 Charlie Simmons WR; Reserve: 48 Mike Bartrum TE (IR); 11 Ty Detmer QB (IR); 67 Paul Hutchins LT (IR); 70 Jeff Miller RT (IR); 38 Brian Satterfield FB (IR); 53 active, 5 inactive, 4 practice squad Rookies in italics

== Regular season ==
The Packers finished with an 11–5 record, clinching the NFC Central crown by a slim 1-game margin over the Detroit Lions.

=== Schedule ===
Week	Date	Opponent	Result	Record	Venue	Attendance
1	September 3	St. Louis Rams	**L** 14–17	0–1	Lambeau Field	60,104
2	September 11	at **Chicago Bears**	**W** 27–24	1–1	Soldier Field	64,855
3	September 17	New York Giants	**W** 14–6	2–1	Lambeau Field	60,117
4	September 24	at Jacksonville Jaguars	**W** 24–14	3–1	Jacksonville Municipal Stadium	66,744
5	Bye					
6	October 8	at Dallas Cowboys	**L** 24–34	3–2	Texas Stadium	64,806
7	October 15	**Detroit Lions**	**W** 30–21	4–2	Lambeau Field	60,302
8	October 22	**Minnesota Vikings**	**W** 38–21	5–2	Lambeau Field	60,332
9	October 29	at **Detroit Lions**	**L** 16–24	5–3	Pontiac Silverdome	73,462
10	November 5	at **Minnesota Vikings**	**L** 24–27	5–4	Hubert H. Humphrey Metrodome	62,839
11	November 12	**Chicago Bears**	**W** 35–28	6–4	Lambeau Field	59,996
12	November 19	at Cleveland Browns	**W** 31–20	7–4	Cleveland Municipal Stadium	55,388
13	November 26	**Tampa Bay Buccaneers**	**W** 35–13	8–4	Lambeau Field	59,218
14	December 3	Cincinnati Bengals	**W** 24–10	9–4	Lambeau Field	60,318
15	December 10	at **Tampa Bay Buccaneers**	**L** 10–13 (OT)	9–5	Tampa Stadium	67,557
16	December 16	at New Orleans Saints	**W** 34–23	10–5	Louisiana Superdome	50,132
17	December 24	Pittsburgh Steelers	**W** 24–19	11–5	Lambeau Field	60,649

Note: Intra-division opponents are in bold text.

=== Game summaries ===
==== Week 1: vs St. Louis Rams ====
Week 1: Green Bay Packers VS St. Louis Rams

Quarter	1	2	3	4	Total
**Rams**	0	7	7	3	**17**
Packers	0	0	7	7	**14**

at Lambeau Field, Green Bay, Wisconsin

- Date: September 3, 1995
- Game time: 12:00 p.m. CST
- Game weather: Overcast, 69 °F (21 °C)
- Game attendance: 60,104
- TV announcers (FOX): Kenny Albert, Anthony Muñoz

Game information

**First quarter**

**Second quarter**

**Third quarter**

**Fourth quarter**

Top passers

- GB – Brett Favre – 29/51, 299 yards, 2 TD, 3 INT
- STL – Chris Miller – 19/30, 166 yards, 2 TD

Top rushers

- GB – Edgar Bennett – 10 rushes, 21 yards
- STL – Leonard Russell – 10 rushes, 36 yards

Top receivers

- GB – Mark Chmura – 7 receptions, 97 yards, 1 TD
- STL – Isaac Bruce – 4 receptions, 55 yards, 1 TD

==== Week 2: at Chicago Bears ====
Week 2: Green Bay Packers at Chicago Bears

Quarter	1	2	3	4	Total
**Packers**	14	10	3	0	**27**
Bears	0	7	7	10	**24**

at Soldier Field, Chicago, Illinois

- Date: September 11, 1995
- Game time: 7:00 p.m. CST
- Game weather: Overcast, 57 °F (14 °C)
- Game attendance: 59,679
- TV announcers (ABC): Al Michaels (Play by Play), Frank Gifford and Dan Dierdorf (Color Commentators), Lynn Swann (Sideline)

Game information

**First quarter**

**Second quarter**

**Third quarter**

**Fourth quarter**

Top passers

- GB – Brett Favre – 21/37, 312 yards, 3 TD, INT
- CHI – Erik Kramer – 15/25, 162 yards, TD, INT

Top rushers

- GB – Edgar Bennett – 30 rushes, 96 yards
- CHI – Robert Green – 10 rushes, 63 yards

Top receivers

- GB – Robert Brooks – 8 receptions, 161 yards, 2 TD
- CHI – Curtis Conway – 3 receptions, 63 yards

==== Week 3: vs New York Giants ====
Week 3: New York Giants at Green Bay Packers – Game summary

Quarter	1	2	3	4	Total
Giants	0	3	0	3	**6**
**Packers**	7	7	0	0	**14**

at Lambeau Field, Green Bay, Wisconsin

- Date: September 17
- Game time: 12:00 p.m. CDT
- Game weather: Partly cloudy, 57 °F (14 °C)
- Game attendance: 60,117
- Referee: Johnny Grier
- TV announcers (Fox): Pat Summerall and John Madden

Game information

**First quarter**

- GB – Mark Ingram 11-yard pass from Brett Favre (Craig Hentrich kick), 10:10. Packers 7–0.

**Second quarter**

- GB – Robert Brooks 19-yard pass from Brett Favre (Craig Hentrich kick), 9:06. Packers 14–0.
- NYG – Brad Daluiso 37-yard field goal, 5:46. Packers 14–3.

**Third quarter**

- No scoring plays.

**Fourth quarter**

- NYG – Brad Daluiso 32-yard field goal, 3:21. Packers 14–6.

**Top passers**

- NYG – Dave Brown – 23/50, 199 yards, INT
- GB – Brett Favre – 14/25, 141 yards, 2 TD

**Top rushers**

- NYG – Rodney Hampton – 16 rushes, 86 yards
- GB – Edgar Bennett – 23 rushes, 87 yards

**Top receivers**

- NYG – Mike Sherrard – 7 receptions, 74 yards
- GB – Robert Brooks – 5 receptions, 47 yards, TD

==== Week 4: at Jacksonville Jaguars ====
Week 4: Jacksonville Jaguars vs Green Bay Packers

Quarter	1	2	3	4	Total
**Packers**	0	10	7	7	**24**
Jaguars	0	0	0	14	**14**

at Jacksonville Municipal Stadium, Jacksonville, Florida

- Date: September 24, 1995
- Game time: 7:00 p.m. CST/8:00 p.m. EST
- Game weather: Overcast, 74 °F (23 °C)
- Game attendance: 66,744
- TV announcers (TNT): Verne Lundquist and Pat Haden

Game information

**First quarter**

**Second quarter**

**Third quarter**

**Fourth quarter**

Top passers

- GB – Brett Favre – 20/30, 202 yards, 2 TD, INT
- JAX – Mark Brunell – 16/29, 156 yards, 2 TD

Top rushers

- GB – Edgar Bennett – 21 rushes, 66 yards
- JAX – James Stewart – 13 rushes, 38 yards

Top receivers

- GB – Anthony Morgan – 3 receptions, 51 yards, TD
- JAX – Willie Jackson – 7 receptions, 66 yards, 2 TD

==== Week 11: vs Chicago Bears ====
Week 11: Green Bay Packers VS Chicago Bears

Quarter	1	2	3	4	Total
Bears	7	14	7	0	**28**
**Packers**	14	7	7	7	**35**

at Lambeau Field, Green Bay, Wisconsin

- Date: November 12, 1995
- Game time: 12:00 p.m. CST
- Game weather: Overcast, 49 °F (9 °C)
- Game attendance: 59,996
- TV announcers (FOX): Dick Stockton, Matt Millen

Game information

**First quarter**

**Second quarter**

**Third quarter**

**Fourth quarter**

Top passers

- CHI – Erik Kramer – 23/38, 318 yards, 2 TD, 1 INT
- GB – Brett Favre – 25/33, 336 yards, 5 TD

Top rushers

- CHI – Robert Green – 16 rushes, 68 yards
- GB – Dorsey Levens – 3 rushes, 26 yards

Top receivers

- CHI – Curtis Conway – 6 receptions, 126 yards, 2 TD
- GB – Robert Brooks – 6 receptions, 138 yards, 2 TD

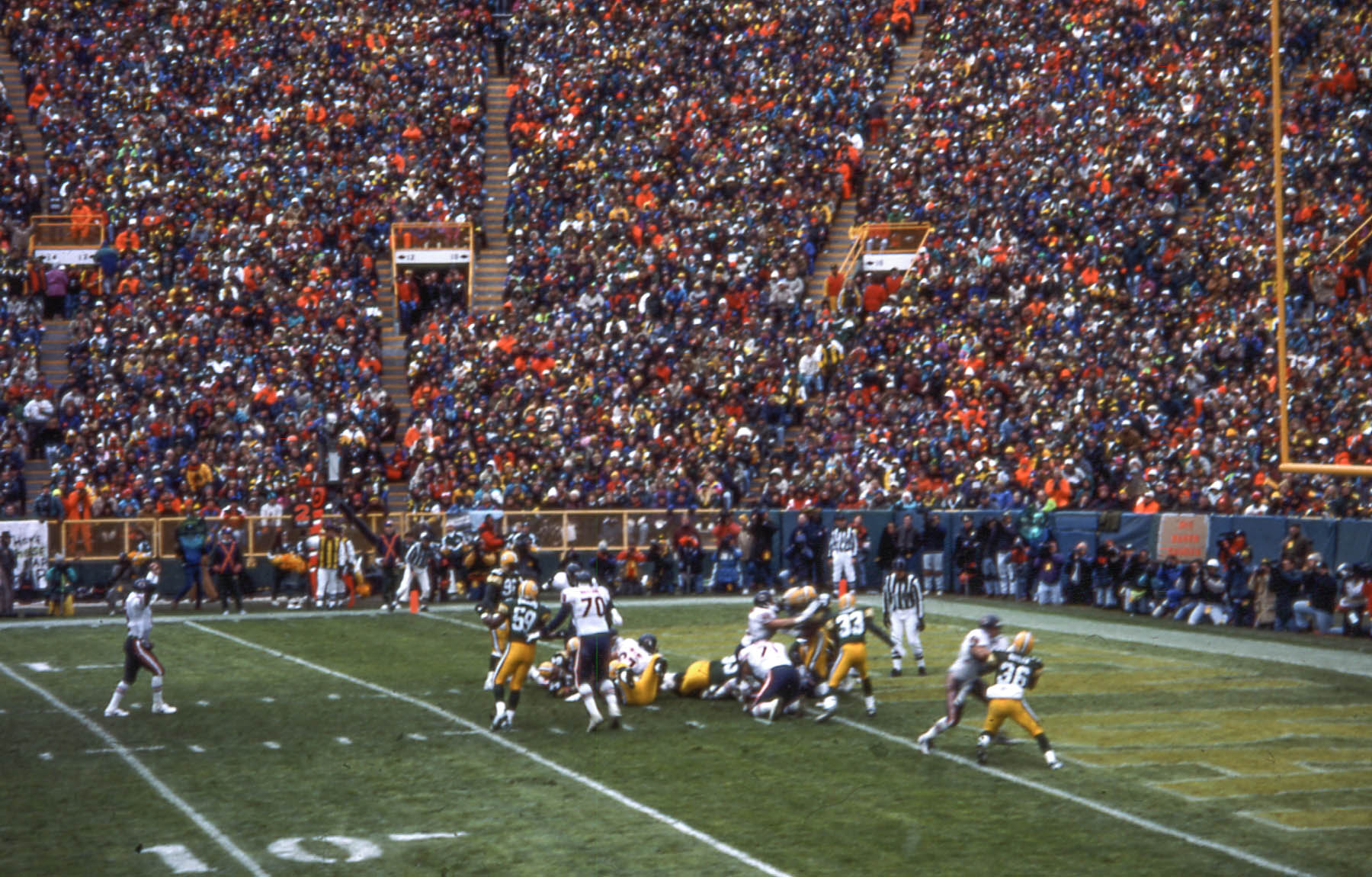
Packers playing the Bears On November 12th

=== Standings ===
NFC Central
	W	L	T	PCT	PF	PA	STK
^{(3)} Green Bay Packers	11	5	0	.688	404	314	W2
^{(5)} Detroit Lions	10	6	0	.625	436	336	W7
Chicago Bears	9	7	0	.563	392	360	W2
Minnesota Vikings	8	8	0	.500	412	385	L2
Tampa Bay Buccaneers	7	9	0	.438	238	335	L2

=== Postseason ===
Playoff Round	Date	Opponent (seed)	Result	Record	Game Site	NFL.com recap
Wild Card	December 31, 1995	Atlanta Falcons (6)	**W** 37–20	1–0	Lambeau Field	Recap
Divisional	January 6, 1996	at San Francisco 49ers (2)	**W** 27–17	2–0	Candlestick Park	Recap
NFC Championship	January 14, 1996	at Dallas Cowboys (1)	**L** 27–38	2–1	Texas Stadium	Recap

== Awards and records ==
- Brett Favre, NFL MVP
- Brett Favre, Bert Bell Award
- Brett Favre, Offense, UPI NFC Player of the Year
- Brett Favre, NFC Pro Bowl Selection
- Brett Favre, All-Pro Selection
- Brett Favre, National Football League Offensive Player of the Year Award
- Brett Favre, NFC Leader, Average Yards per Completion: 7.7
- Brett Favre, NFC Leader, Passer Rating (99.5)
- Brett Favre, NFC Leader, Touchdown Passes: 38
- Brett Favre, NFL Leader, Passing Yards, (4,413 yards)
- Reggie White, Defense, UPI NFC Player of the Year
- Reggie White, NFC Pro Bowl Selection

=== Milestones ===
- Brett Favre, 1st NFL Season with 4,000 Passing Yards
