= LeRoy Butler =

American football player (born 1968)

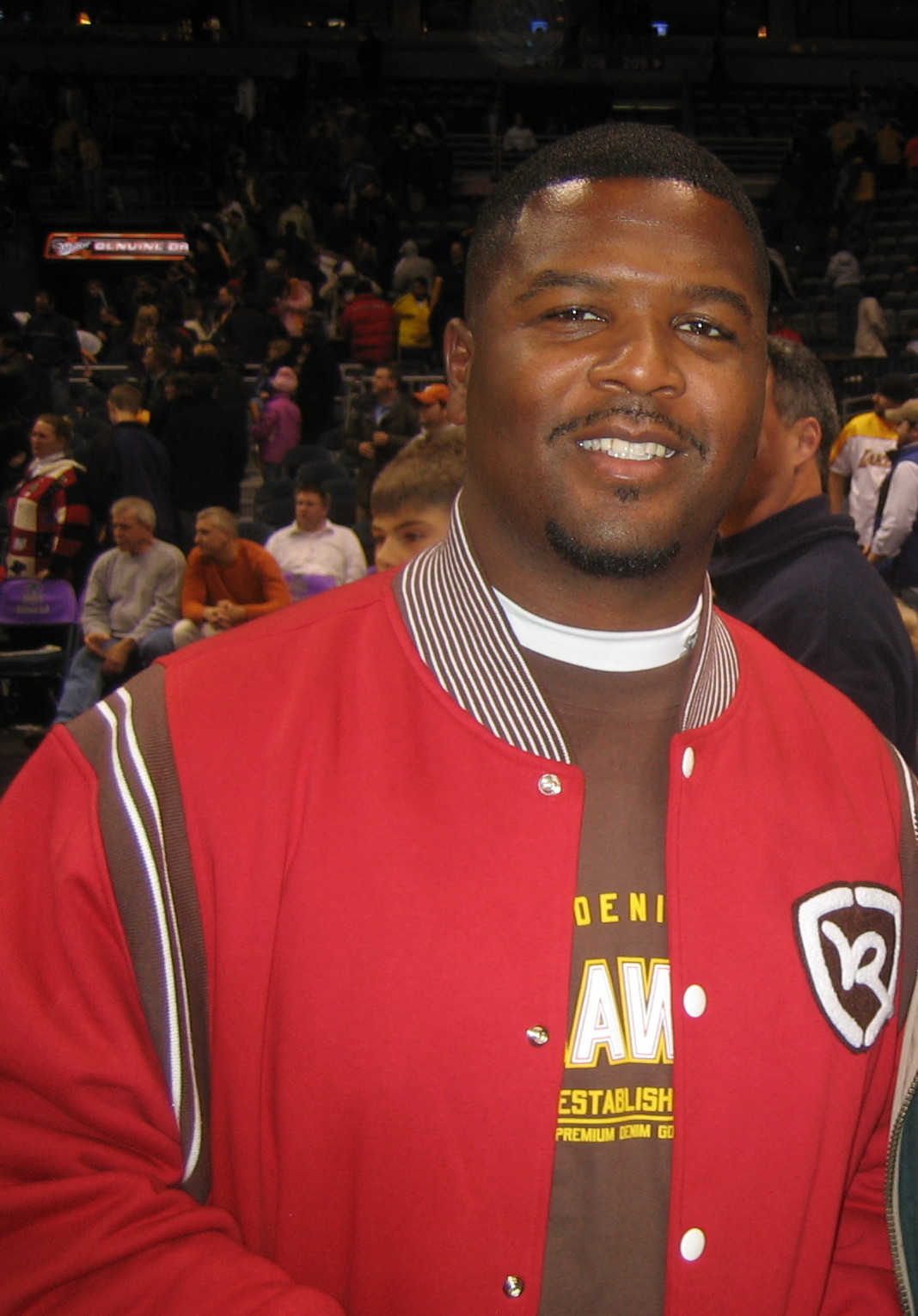
- Butler at the Bradley Center in Milwaukee in 2005

No. 36
- Position: Safety

Personal information
- Born: July 19, 1968 (age 58); Jacksonville, Florida, U.S.
- Listed height: 6 ft 0 in (1.83 m)
- Listed weight: 197 lb (89 kg)

Career information
- High school: Robert E. Lee (Jacksonville)
- College: Florida State (1986–1989)
- NFL draft: 1990: 2nd round, 48th overall pick

Career history
- Green Bay Packers (1990–2001)

Awards and highlights
- Super Bowl champion (XXXI); 4× First-team All-Pro (1993, 1996–1998); 4× Pro Bowl (1993, 1996–1998); NFL 1990s All-Decade Team; Green Bay Packers Hall of Fame; Consensus All-American (1989)

Career NFL statistics
- Tackles: 989
- Interceptions: 38
- Sacks: 20.5
- Forced fumbles: 13
- Stats at Pro Football Reference
- Pro Football Hall of Fame

LeRoy Butler III (born July 19, 1968) is an American former professional football player who spent his entire 12-year career from 1990 to 2001 as a safety for the Green Bay Packers of the National Football League (NFL). He was inducted into the Pro Football Hall of Fame in 2022.

Butler was born in Jacksonville, Florida, where he was challenged by physical problems which forced him to wear leg braces and use a wheelchair at times during his childhood. However, he overcame his disability and was able to excel at high school football; Butler was named one of the 33 best Florida High School football players of all time in 2007. He went on to be a three-year starter playing college football for the Florida State Seminoles, and after a successful college career, he was selected in the second round (48th overall) of the 1990 NFL draft by the Packers.

In his 12 seasons with the Packers, Butler was a four-time first-team All-Pro. Butler recorded a sack in the Packers' Super Bowl XXXI win over the New England Patriots, and he is recognized as the creator of the Lambeau Leap touchdown celebration. Butler was named a member of the NFL 1990s All-Decade Team and was enshrined in the Green Bay Packers Hall of Fame.

== Early life ==
Butler attended Robert E. Lee High School in Jacksonville, Florida, and played under the direction of the all-time wins leader for a high school football coach in the state of Florida's history, Corky Rogers. Rogers coached at Robert E. Lee High School from 1972 to 1988, where he coached Butler and fellow NFL star Edgar Bennett, and from 1989 to 2016 at The Bolles School in Jacksonville, having won a total of 8 football State Championships. Before moving onto Florida State, Butler was an astounding player for the Robert E. Lee High School Generals football program.

== College career ==
Butler played under head coach Bobby Bowden at Florida State University from 1986–1989. He was ineligible to participate during his freshman year due to his academics failing to meet standards, disqualifying him due to Prop–48. He played safety during his first two seasons at FSU and was only moved to cornerback in for his third season in order to replace Deion Sanders. His transition from safety to cornerback caused issues for him during the draft process, as teams were conflicted on which position he would play in the NFL. On September 2, 1989, the No. 6 FSU lost 30–26 in a huge upset in their season-opener to Southern Miss, led by Brett Favre.

He was a three-year starter, collecting 194 tackles and 9 interceptions, but he's most remembered by FSU fans for his role in the "puntrooskie." In 1988, against rival Clemson, FSU was backed up to its own 21-yard line, on fourth down, with a minute and 30 seconds left to play and the score tied at 21. Bowden called the famous trick play, a fake punt. The snap went to upback Dayne Williams and he slipped the ball to Butler, who ran 78 yards to set up the game-winning field goal.

== Professional career ==
=== Pre-draft ===
On January 22, 1990, Butler participated in the 1990 Senior Bowl as part of the South team, who was led by Philadelphia Eagles' head coach Buddy Ryan, as they lost 41–0 to the North team led by Kansas City Chiefs' head coach Marty Schottenheimer. He performed well, earning Top Player honors, along with Richmond Webb, Bryce Paup, and Terrance Mathis. He attended the NFL Scouting Combine and performed all of the positional and combined drills. The majority of NFL draft analysts projected Butler to be a late first to second round pick. Due to Butler playing free safety for his first two seasons and switching to cornerback in his third season in order to replace Deion Sanders, many teams were conflicted on which position Butler would play professionally. This had a possible effect on his draft stock due to teams preferring to draft players with a set position.

Pre-draft measurables
Height	Weight	Arm length	Hand span	40-yard dash	10-yard split	20-yard split	20-yard shuttle	Vertical jump	Broad jump	Bench press
5 ft 11 in (1.80 m)	193 lb (88 kg)	29 3/8 in (0.75 m)	9 1/4 in (0.23 m)	4.56 s	1.61 s	2.68 s	4.29 s	32 in (0.81 m)	9 ft 6 in (2.90 m)	9 reps
All values from NFL Combine

=== 1990 ===
The Green Bay Packers selected Butler in the second round (48th overall) of the 1990 NFL draft. He was the fourth cornerback drafted in 1990. While following the 1990 NFL Draft amongst family, friends, and coaches at his mother's apartment in Jacksonville, Butler became visibly discouraged after hearing the 44th overall selection by the New Orleans Saints was for cornerback Vince Buck from unknown Central State, a small HBCU NAIA Division I located in Wilberforce, Ohio. Central State is virtually unknown in reference to the NFL draft, as Vince Buck was only the fourth player ever selected (since 1967) and the first since 1979.

On July 26, 1990, the Green Bay Packers signed Butler to a three–year, $970,000 rookie contract that included a signing bonus of $270,000.

He entered training camp his rookie season as a cornerback and, at the time, there had been no plans for him to play safety. He provided depth following the departure of Van Jakes. On July 26, 1990, the Packers placed No. 1 starting cornerback Dave Brown on the physically unable-to-perform list due tendinitis in his Achilles tendon. Defensive coordinator Hank Bullough was tasked to name replacements for both starting roles, with candidates including Butler, Jerry Holmes, and Mark Lee. He considers Dave Brown and Mark Lee as his mentors. Head coach Lindy Infante named Butler a backup and listed him as the third cornerback on the depth chart to begin the season, behind starting cornerbacks Jerry Holmes and Mark Lee.

On September 9, 1990, Butler made his professional regular season debut in the Packers' home-opener against the Los Angeles Rams and had three solo tackles and one pass deflection during a 36–24 victory. On October 28, 1990, Butler made one solo tackle, two pass deflections, and set a season-high with two interceptions on passes thrown by Rich Gannon during a 10–24 win against the Minnesota Vikings. In Week 16, he set a season-high with six solo tackles, had one pass break-up, and intercepted a pass by Rodney Peete as the Packers lost 24–17 to the Detroit Lions. He finished his rookie season with (24 solo), six pass deflections, and three interceptions in 16 games with zero starts.

=== 1991 ===
The Green Bay Packers selected cornerback Vinnie Clark in the first round (19th overall) of the 1991 NFL draft, after they traded their original 1991 first round pick (8th overall) to the Philadelphia Eagles for their 1991 first round pick (19th overall) and 1992 first round pick (17th overall). This decision, to draft Vinnie Clark, became one of the main catalysts to set in motion events that would result in their upcoming success. With two cornerbacks selected in the first round of back-to-back drafts, would result in Butler moving to strong safety. The 1992 first round pick would be traded to the Atlanta Falcons in exchange for Brett Favre.

Throughout training camp, Butler competed against rookie Vinnie Clark, Jerry Holmes, and Roland Mitchell to be the No. 1 starting cornerback following the departure of Mark Lee. Head coach Lindy Infante named Butler and Jerry Holmes the starting cornerbacks to begin the season.

On September 1, 1991, Butler earned his first career start in the Green Bay Packers' home-opener against the Philadelphia Eagles and intercepted a pass by Jim McMahon during their 3–20 loss. In Week 13, Butler had his third interception of the season on a pass attempt thrown by Jeff George during a 10–14 victory against the Indianapolis Colts. He started all 16 games throughout the season and recorded a total of 63 combined tackles, had three interceptions, and made one fumble recovery. On December 22, 1991, the Green Bay Packers' new General Manager Ron Wolf announced his decision to fire head coach Lindy Infante after the 1991 NFL season concluded with a 4–12 record after a 27–7 win at the Miami Dolphins the previous day. This also included Infante's entire coaching staff. Wolf has officially taken over as General Manager the previous month, replacing Tom Braatz.

=== 1992 ===
On January 11, 1992 the Green Bay Packers hired San Francisco 49ers' offensive coordinator Mike Holmgren to be their new head coach. Holmgren hired 49ers' defensive backs coach Ray Rhodes as defensive coordinator. The Packers selected cornerback Terrell Buckley in the first round (5th overall) of the 1992 NFL draft and planned for him to start alongside 1991 first round pick Vinnie Clark.

With both starting cornerback roles already planned for, defensive coordinator, Ray Rhodes, presented Butler with the idea of moving him to free safety. He was open to it, but amended the change to switch to strong safety instead. On May 8, 1992, the Packers released long-time starting strong safety Mark Murphy after he requested it after he was informed of Butler's transition to strong safety and expected to probably lost his starting role. Head coach Mike Holmgren named Butler the starting strong safety to begin the season alongside free safety Chuck Cecil.

On October 13, 1992, the Green Bay Packers signed Butler to a two–year, $1.36 million contract extension that kept him under contract throughout the 1995 NFL season. On November 15, 1992, Butler helped lead the Packers to a 24–27 comeback victory against the Philadelphia Eagles by recovering a fumble with around five minutes remaining in the fourth quarter after running back Heath Sherman carried the ball to the 12–yard line before linebacker Ron Noble tackled forced a fumble by Sherman as he attempted to tackle him, causing them to collide with Chuck Cecil and Roland Miller. Butler returned it 17–yards and a field goal on the ensuing drive would tie the game 24–24. In Week 12, Butler had his lone interception of the season on a pass by backup quarterback Peter Tom Willis in the second half of a 17–3 victory at the Chicago Bears. On December 10, 1992, the NFL issued a one–game suspension to Butler for delivering a leaping forearm blow to the helmet of Lions' quarterback Andre Ware after he had already passed the ball in Week 14. He ended the season with 71 combined tackles, one forced fumble, one fumble recovery, and one interception in 15 games and 15 starts.

=== 1993 ===
Following the departure of 1993 Pro Bowl starting free safety Chuck Cecil to the Phoenix Cardinals, the Packers acquired Mike Prior as a free agent and selected George Teague in the first round (29th overall) of the 1993 NFL draft. Butler returned as the de facto starting strong safety under defensive backs coach Dick Jauron and began the season alongside Mike Prior.

On September 5, 1993, Butler started in the Green Bay Packers' home-opener against the Los Angeles Rams and made five combined tackles (four solo), set a season-high with four pass deflections, and had his first interception of the season on a pass by Jim Everett during a 6–36 victory. In Week 5, he set a season-high with nine solo tackles during a 14–36 loss at the Dallas Cowboys. On October 31, 1993, Butler made nine combined tackles (eight solo), one pass deflection, an interception, and sealed a 3–17 victory against the Chicago Bears by making his first career sack on John Harbaugh in the fourth quarter and forcing a fumble that he recovered as they led the Bears 10–3. In Week 11, he had six combined tackles (five solo), two pass deflections, and intercepted a pass by Wade Wilson during a 17–19 last second fourth quarter comeback at the New Orleans Saints. In Week 15, he made three solo tackles, two pass deflections, and set a career-high with his sixth interception of the season on a pass attempt thrown by Stan Humphries during a 20–13 win at the San Diego Chargers. He started all 16 games for the first time in his career and finished with 90 combined tackles (73 solo), 23 pass deflections, six interceptions, one sack, and scored one touchdown. He was selected to the 1994 Pro Bowl, marking the first of four Pro Bowl selections of his career.

The Green Bay Packers finished the 1993 NFL season in third place in the NFC Central division with a 9–7 record to clinch a Wild-Card position. On January 8, 1994, Butler started in the first postseason appearance of his career and recorded nine combined tackles (seven solo) during a 28–24 victory at the Detroit Lions in the NFC Wild-Card Game. On January 16, 1994, Butler started in the NFC Divisional Round at Texas Stadium and recorded seven solo tackles, made two pass deflections, recovered a fumble by Emmitt Smith, and intercepted a pass thrown by Troy Aikman as the Packers lost 17–27 to the Dallas Cowboys. The Dallas Cowboys would win Super Bowl XXVIII to mark back-to-back Super Bowl championships as they were in the midst of their dynasty.

==== Lambeau leap ====
On December 26, 1993, Butler recorded five combined tackles (three solo) and forced a fumble that led to the first touchdown of his career as the Packers routed the Los Angeles Raiders 0–28. His touchdown led to his celebration known as the "Lambeau Leap". During the fourth quarter, running back Randy Jordan caught a short shuffle pass from quarterback Vince Evans and was immediately met with a hit by Butler, to force a fumble, that bounced into the hands of defensive tackle Reggie White. After recovering the fumble, White turned to head towards the endzone, but was met with a tackle by guard Steve Wisniewski, who attempted to take White down, forcing him to fall out-of-bounds. Reggie White would spot LeRoy Butler in time to toss him the ball, leading to Butler returning it to the endzone for a touchdown. Excited by the turn of events, Butler ran towards the cheering crowd behind the endzone to celebrate and leapt into the embrace of the Packers' fans.

The move was later popularized by wide receiver Robert Brooks, who carried it a step further by leaping completely into the stands. This move is called the Lambeau Leap and now is used after most Packer touchdowns scored at Lambeau Field. Butler originated the touchdown celebration known as the Lambeau Leap.

=== 1994 ===
On June 13, 1994, the Green Bay Packers signed Butler to a three–year, $5.40 million contract extension that included a signing bonus of $800,000. The Packers hired Fritz Shurmur to be their new defensive coordinator after Ray Rhodes accepted the defensive coordinator job for the San Francisco 49ers. Fritz Shurmur would change the base defense from the normal 3-4 defense to a base 4-3 defense. The new defensive approach sharply increased the number of blitzes and began using Butler in numerous different positions to blitz or provide pressure to the quarterback. Head coach Mike Holmgren named him the starting strong safety to begin the season and paired him with George Teague. The defense this season also featured Reggie White, Steve McMichael, Sean Jones, and Bryce Paup.

On September 11, 1994, Butler made six combined tackles (five solo) and he had his first and only sack of the season on Dan Marino for an eight–yard loss as the Packers lost 24–14 to the Miami Dolphins. He was inactive for the next three games (Weeks 3–5) after he was hospitalized with viral pneumonia. In Week 10, he made three combined tackles (one solo) and picked off a pass by Scott Mitchell to wide receiver Herman Moore as the Packers defeated the Detroit Lions 30–38. In Week 12, he set a season-high with 13 combined tackles (ten solo) during a 20–29 loss at the Buffalo Bills. He finished the season with 63 combined tackles (47 solo), five pass deflections, a forced fumble, one sack, and three interceptions in 13 games and 13 starts.

=== 1995 ===
He returned as the starting strong safety to start the season and was once again paired with George Teague. In Week 6, Butler set a career-high with 13 solo tackles as the Peckers lost 24–34 to the Dallas Cowboys. In Week 11, Butler made seven combined tackles (five solo), one pass deflection, a sack, and helped secure a 28–36 victory at the Chicago Bears by intercepting a pass by Erik Kramer to tight end Ryan Wetnight with about two minutes remaining. The following week, Butler recorded four solo tackles, had a single pass deflection, and helped secure a 31–20 victory at the Cleveland Browns by picking off a pass Vinny Testaverde threw to wide receiver Andre Rison as Green Bay led 24–13 in the fourth quarter in Week 12. He returned is for a season-high 76–yards and it would lead to a four–yard rushing touchdown by quarterback Brett Favre two plays later. He started all 16 games and led the team with 100 combined tackles (82 solo), while also recording 13 pass deflections, five interceptions, a forced fumble, and a sack.

The Green Bay Packers finished the 1995 NFL season first in the NFC Central with an 11–5 record, clinching a playoff berth. They would defeat the Atlanta Falcons 37–20 in the NFC Wild-Card Game and follow up with a 27–17 win at the San Francisco 49ers' in the Divisional Round. On January 14, 1996, Butler started in the NFC Championship Game for the first time in his career and recorded seven combined tackles (four solo) as the Packers lost 27–38 at the Dallas Cowboys, marking their third consecutive playoff elimination to Dallas.

=== 1996 ===
On June 27, 1996, the Green Bay Packers traded defensive end Matt LaBounty to the Seattle Seahawks in return for two-time Pro Bowl free safety Eugene Robinson, who started in 152/160 games for them over the last ten seasons. On July 17, 1996, the Packers subsequently traded safety George Teague to the Atlanta Falcons for a conditional 1997 late-round draft selection. Entering training camp, Butler and Robinson were slated as the de facto starting safeties and would remain the starting pair throughout the season.

On September 1, 1996, Butler started in the Green Bay Packers' season-opener at the Tampa Bay Buccaneers and made five combined tackles (three solo), two pass deflections, and set a season-high with two interceptions on pass attempts by Trent Dilfer as they won 34–3. In Week 3, Butler made four combined tackles (three solo), set a season-high with three pass deflections, had two interceptions, and returned one of the interceptions by Stan Humphries 90–yards for a touchdown during a 10–42 win against the San Diego Chargers. In Week 7, Butler made four combined tackles (three solo), two pass deflections, and intercepted a pass by Elvis Grbac to fullback Tommy Vardell during a 23–20 overtime victory against the San Francisco 49ers. In Week 9, he set a season-high with 11 combined tackles (four solo), made 1.5 sacks, and had a pass deflection during a 13–7 win against the Tampa Bay Buccaneers.

On November 6, 1996, the Green Bay Packers signed Butler to a five–year, $15 million contract extension that includes a signing bonus of $5 million. In Week 13, Butler had six combined tackles (four solo) and set a career-high with two sacks on Tony Banks during a 24–9 win at the St. Louis Rams. He started all 16 games throughout the season and finished with 87 combined tackles (65 solo), 14 pass deflections, set a career-high with 6.5 sacks, had five interceptions, and scored a single touchdown. The addition of Eugene Robinson allowed defensive coordinator Fritz Shurmur to use Butler to shoot gaps on blitzes and also provide pass coverage over the top if any of the cornerbacks were beat in coverage as Robinson had impressive coverage ability that complemented the entire secondary. This combination earned Robinson six interceptions to tie for second in the NFC and Butler to record 6.5 sacks for the second most in a season by a defensive back in NFL history, finishing only behind Dave Duerson with seven in 1986. His performance earned him First-team All-Pro and a selection to the 1997 Pro Bowl.

==== Super Bowl XXXI ====
The Green Bay Packers finished the 1996 NFL season with a 13–3 record, which was the best record that season and earned them a first round bye and home-field advantage throughout the playoffs. They would easily defeat the San Francisco 49ers 35–14 in the NFC Divisional Round and the Carolina Panthers 30–13 in the NFC Championship Game. On January 26, 1997, Butler would start in Super Bowl XXXI against the New England Patriots and had a stellar performance, recording seven solo tackles and a sack on Drew Bledsoe as the Packers defeated the Patriots 35–21 in the Louisiana Superdome. This would earn Butler his first and only Super Bowl ring.

=== 1997 ===
The Green Bay Packers selected safety Darren Sharper in the second round (60th overall) of the 1997 NFL draft. Although Sharper arrived to the Packers, head coach Mike Holmgren chose to retain Butler and Eugene Robinson as the starting safeties to begin the season. In Week 3, Butler made six combined tackles (three solo), two pass deflections, and set a season-high with two interceptions off passes thrown by Brad Johnson as the Packers defeated the Minnesota Vikings 38–32. On October 27, 1997, Butler had six combined tackles (four solo), one fumble recovery, a sack, and intercepted a pass by Drew Bledsoe to wide receiver Vincent Brisby during a 28–10 win at the New England Patriots. The following week, he recorded eight combined tackles (six solo), had two pass break-ups, and also intercepted two pass attempts by Scott Mitchell during a 20–10 win against the Detroit Lions in Week 10. In Week 11, he set a season-high with nine combined tackles (eight solo) and sacked Tony Banks during a 17–7 win against the St. Louis Rams. He finished with a career-high 103 combined tackles (71 solo), made ten pass deflections, five interceptions, two sacks, one forced fumble, and a fumble recovery. He earned his third Pro Bowl of his career, but was unable to participate in the 1998 Pro Bowl due to the playoffs.

==== Super Bowl XXXII ====
The Green Bay Packers finished atop the NFC Central for the second season in-a-row with a 13–3 record to clinch a first-round bye. On January 4, 1998, he made five combined tackles (four solo) and had one sack during a 7–21 victory over the Tampa Bay Buccaneers in the Divisional Round. They followed it up with a 23–10 victory at the San Francisco 49ers in the NFC Championship Game. On January 25, 1998, Butler started in Super Bowl XXXII and recorded nine combined tackles (seven solo) as the Packers lost 24–31 to the Denver Broncos. The Denver Broncos would repeat as Super Bowl Champions the following season in 1998.

=== 1998 ===
After two seasons alongside 13-year veteran Eugene Robinson, Butler was paired with Darren Sharper after Robinson departed to the Atlanta Falcons in free agency after he was informed the Packers planned to demote him to backup behind third-year player, Darren Sharper.

"With LeRoy Butler, you never know. There's an awfully good football player, and Fritz uses him in any role he can. Sometimes he lines up as a linebacker. Sometimes he's strong safety, sometimes he blitzes. He'll come at you from any direction."

(December 7, 1998)

— Rich McKay (Bucs' General Manager)

On September 6, 1998, Butler started in the Packers' home-opener against the Detroit Lions and made six combined tackles (five solo), a pass deflection, and returned a fumble recovery that linebacker Brian Williams forced by quarterback Scott Mitchell for a 32–yard touchdown as they won 38–19. In Week 9, he recorded six combined tackles (five solo) and set a season-high with two sacks on Steve Young as the Packers defeated the San Francisco 49ers 36–22. In Week 11, Butler made five combined tackles (three solo), set a season-high with three pass deflections, and intercepted two passes by Danny Kanell during a 37–3 victory at the New York Giants. In Week 16, he set a season-high with ten combined tackles (eight solo) and had one pass break-up during a 30–22 win against the Tennessee Oilers. He started all 16 games for the third consecutive season and finished with 89 combined tackles (64 solo), 17 pass deflections, four sacks, three forced fumbles, three fumble recoveries, three interceptions, and scored one touchdown.

The Green Bay Packers finished the 1998 NFL season with an 11–5 record to finish second in the NFC Central. On January 3, 1999, the Packers lost the NFC Wild-Card Game 27–30 at the San Francisco 49ers.

=== 1999 ===
On January 8, 1999, the Seattle Seahawks announced Mike Holmgren as their Vice President of Operations and Head Coach after he chose not to return to the Packers. Defensive coordinator Fritz Shurmur accepted the same role with the Seahawks, but would be diagnosed with cancer in May.

On January 11, 1999, the Green Bay Packers announced their former defensive coordinator Ray Rhodes as their new head coach after he was fired after four seasons with the Philadelphia Eagles that concluded with a 3–13 record in 1998. Emmitt Thomas would accompany Rhodes from the Eagles to the Packers as the defensive coordinator. The Packers selected Antuan Edwards in the first round (25th overall) of the 1999 NFL draft as Butler's probable replacement.

On October 7, 1999, the Green Bay Packers signed Butler to a three–year, $21.50 million contract extension that includes a signing bonus of $1.63 million.

Nearing the end of the season, Butler openly voiced his displeasure with his different role under defensive coordinator Emmitt Thomas, due to the immense change in the play calling that limited time to only one sack in 1999. Under Fritz Shurmur, Butler was used to blitz and would constantly line up in different spots along the line of scrimmage to cause confusion. Under Emmitt Thomas, he saw his role being limited to only pass coverage with few plays using him to blitz the quarterback.

=== 2000 ===
On January 3, 2000, Green Bay Packers' General Manager Ron Wolf fired head coach Ray Rhodes after one season with an 8–8 record. On January 19, 2000, the Packers announced their decision to hire Seattle Seahawks' offensive coordinator Mike Sherman as their new head coach. Defensive coordinator Ed Donatell retained Butler and Darren Sharper as the starting safeties to begin the season.

On September 24, 2000, Butler made three combined tackles (two solo), set a season-high with two pass deflections, and intercepted a pass by Jake Plummer during a 29–3 victory at Arizona Cardinals. In Week 10, he set a season-high with 11 combined tackles (seven solo) and made one pass deflection during a 26–20 victory against the Minnesota Vikings. He started all 16 games and made 92 combined tackles (66 solo), seven pass deflections, two interceptions, two sacks, a forced fumble, and a fumble recovery.

=== 2001 ===
A broken shoulder blade sustained while tackling Atlanta Falcons running back Maurice Smith in the 2001 season forced him into retirement just before the 2002 season when it was discovered it had not healed properly. In 2007, he was inducted into the Green Bay Packers Hall of Fame.

=== 2002 ===
On June 12, 2002, the Green Bay Packers and Butler agreed to restructure his base salary for the from $2.25 million to $725,000 for the 2002 NFL season.

=== Legacy ===
He played in 181 games, earned a Super Bowl ring, for Super Bowl XXXI, following the 1996 season, was selected as an All-Pro four times and was selected to the Pro Bowl four times (1993, 1996, 1997, and 1998). He was named to the 1990s NFL All Decade Team, by the Pro Football Hall of Fame, and was later inducted into the Green Bay Packers Hall of Fame, in 2007.

On November 21, 2017, Butler was announced as one of 27 semi-finalists for the 2018 class of the Pro Football Hall of Fame. The nomination was not Butler's first to the Hall of Fame, but marked the first time he was named a semi-finalist for the honor.

On January 2, 2020, he was announced as one of the modern-era finalists for the 2020 class of the Hall of Fame. It was his first time being named as a finalist. He joined 14 other modern-era finalists for the class of 2020. On February 10, 2022, Butler was inducted into the Pro Football Hall of Fame.

During his 12 seasons with the Packers, he recorded 953 tackles, 38 interceptions, 553 return yards, 12 fumble recoveries, 3 defensive touchdowns and 20½ sacks. He led or tied for the team lead in interceptions in five different seasons. He was the first defensive back in NFL history to gain entrance in the 20 Sack/20 Interception Club.

== Personal life ==
He grew up on the west side of Jacksonville, Florida in the Blodgett Homes projects. When he was born, he had severe pigeon-toed feet that doctors performed a procedure intentionally breaking his feet at 8-months old. He struggled to walk and spent most of his early childhood in leg braces and a wheelchair until he learned to walk at 8-years old. His parents divorced when he was four–years old and his mother, Eunice, moved him and his four siblings into the Blodgett Homes projects. His mother supported the family as a single mother, working three jobs at some points, but mainly worked as a secretary and as a nurse later on. She died in 2016 from cancer. He has a sister, Vicki, as well as two older brothers, Michael and Darion. During the first two years of his career, Butler built and designed a home located in a country club community on the Southside of hometown, Jacksonville, Florida. He also had homes built earlier in his career for his mother and each one of his three siblings.

During his first two years in the NFL, Butler built himself a home on the Southside of Jacksonville and also built one for his mother and one for each sibling.

He considers his father figure and male role-model growing up as his uncle, Charles "Von" Durham. His uncle convinced his mother to let him begin playing organized youth football when he was 12–years old in a YMCA league.

He married Rhodesia Lee, whom he met as a senior at Florida State where she was a majorette. He has three daughters, LoReal, Gabrielle, and Danielle were conceived with Lee, while Sharon Goldson was from a previous relationship, but were raised by Lee and Butler. They are now divorced.

In 2022, Butler was residing in a modest home in Milwaukee with his current wife Genesis and still works as a radio show co-host on 1250AM The Fan in Milwaukee. He has a son named Leroy Butler Jr. (14 as of 2025) and six daughters that are all grown.

== NFL career statistics ==
Legend
	Won the Super Bowl
**Bold**	Career high

Year	Team	Games		Tackles				Fumbles				Interceptions					
Year	Team	GP	GS	Comb	Solo	Ast	Sacks	FF	FR	Yds	TD	Int	Yds	Avg	Lng	TD	PD
1990	GB	**16**	0	0	0	0	0.0	1	0	0	0	3	42	14.0	28	0	0
1991	GB	**16**	**16**	0	0	0	0.0	1	1	0	0	3	6	2.0	6	0	0
1992	GB	15	15	0	0	0	0.0	1	1	17	0	1	0	0.0	0	0	0
1993	GB	**16**	**16**	89	73	16	1.0	2	1	25	**1**	**6**	131	21.8	39	0	**23**
1994	GB	13	13	63	47	16	1.0	1	0	0	0	3	68	22.7	51	0	5
1995	GB	**16**	**16**	100	**82**	18	1.0	1	0	0	0	5	105	21.0	76	0	13
1996	GB	**16**	**16**	87	65	22	**6.5**	1	**2**	2	0	5	**149**	**29.8**	**90**	**1**	14
1997	GB	**16**	**16**	**102**	70	**32**	3.0	1	1	0	0	5	4	0.8	2	0	10
1998	GB	**16**	**16**	86	61	25	4.0	**3**	**2**	**32**	**1**	3	3	1.0	3	0	15
1999	GB	**16**	**16**	67	49	18	1.0	0	1	0	0	2	0	0.0	0	0	6
2000	GB	**16**	**16**	92	67	25	2.0	1	1	0	0	2	25	12.5	22	0	7
2001	GB	9	9	40	31	9	1.0	0	0	0	0	0	0	0.0	0	0	2
Career		181	165	726	545	181	20.5	13	10	76	2	38	533	14.0	90	1	95
