= Lambeau Leap =

Touchdown celebration popularized by the Green Bay Packers

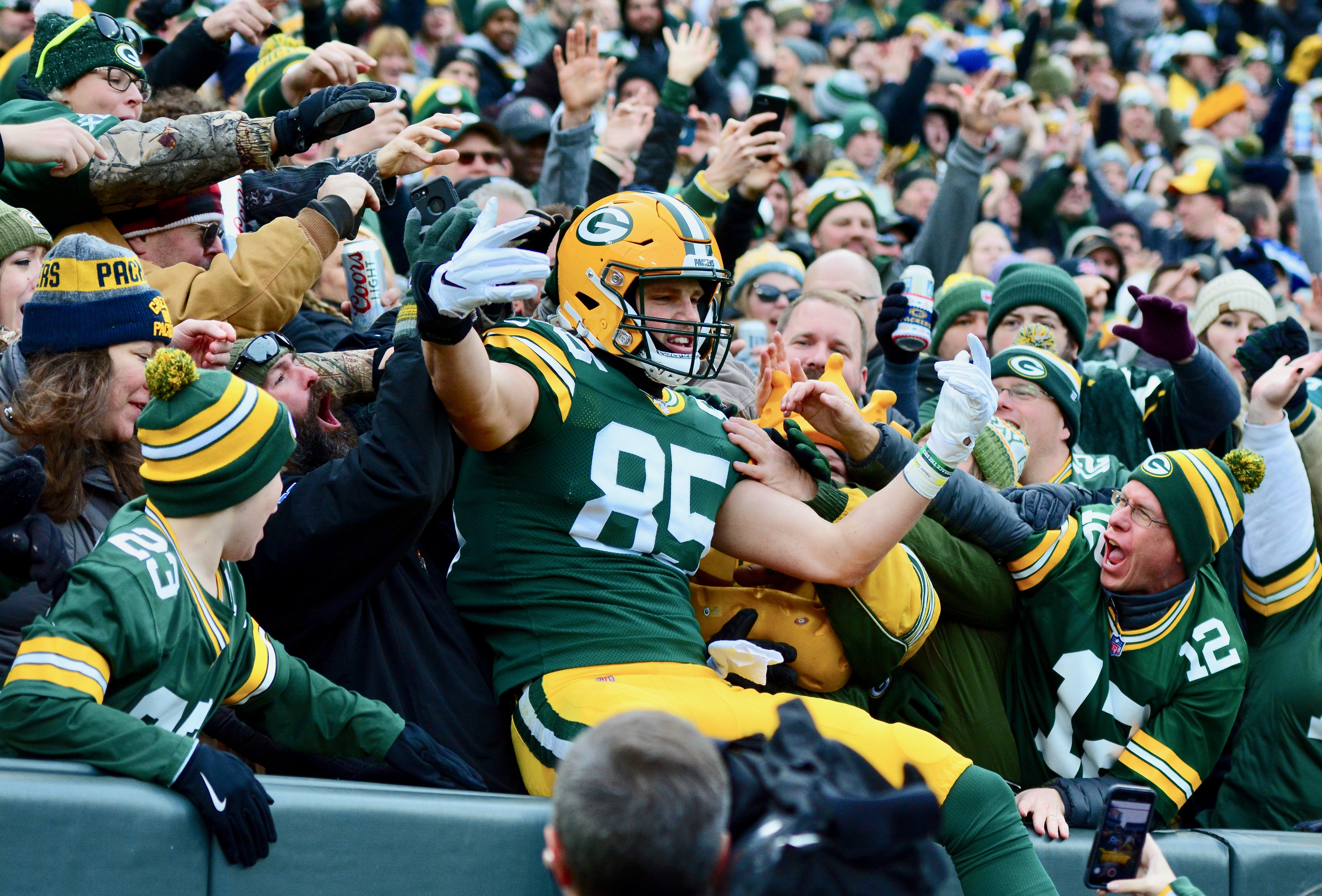
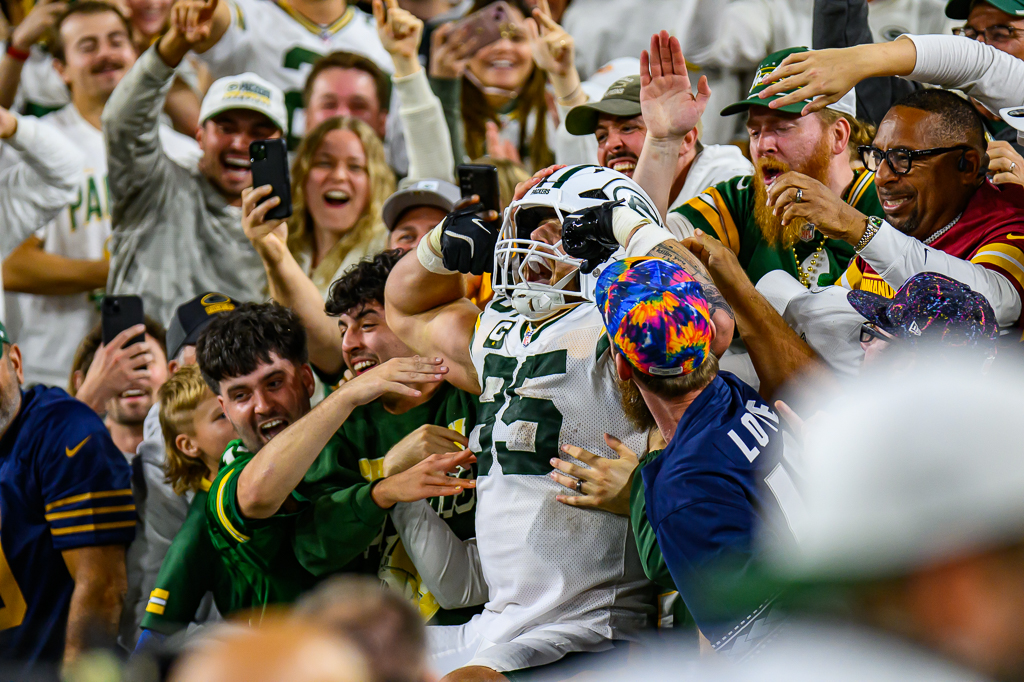
Tight ends Robert Tonyan (top, in 2019) and Tucker Kraft (bottom, in 2025) each performing the Lambeau Leap after a touchdown reception.

The Lambeau Leap is a touchdown celebration in American football in which a player leaps into the bleachers behind the end zone after scoring. The celebration was popularized after Green Bay Packers player LeRoy Butler jumped into the Lambeau Field bleachers after scoring a touchdown from a fumble recovery against the Los Angeles Raiders on December 26, 1993. The celebration has remained popular ever since, even as the National Football League (NFL) tightened rules on touchdown celebrations in the early 2000s. Some safety concerns have been noted by players and staff, including inappropriate touching by fans and the possibility of an injury to the player leaping into the bleachers. Although uncommon, the celebration has been attempted by multiple players from opposing teams at Lambeau Field. The Lambeau Leap is an important component of the history and traditions of the Packers.

== Background ==
The first Lambeau Leap occurred on December 26, 1993, in a historically cold game between the Green Bay Packers and the Los Angeles Raiders. With the Packers leading 14–0 in the fourth quarter, Raiders quarterback Vince Evans took the snap, rolled to his right, and completed a short pass to running back Randy Jordan. Jordan was immediately hit by Packers safety LeRoy Butler and fumbled the ball. The ball bounced directly into Packers defensive lineman Reggie White's hands; White turned around and tried to run to the end zone. However, Raiders guard Steve Wisniewski got a hold of White and slowly tackled him. As White was falling out of bounds, he tossed the ball to Butler, who ran the ball the rest of the way to the end zone for a touchdown. After Butler scored, he dropped the ball, pointed to the bleachers, and leaped into the first row of fans, who then proceeded to embrace him for a few seconds. Butler dropped back down to the field, recovered the ball, and celebrated the score with his teammates. The Packers went on to win the game 28–0. The win clinched the team's first playoff berth in 11 years. At the time, instant replay was not in use in the NFL. Broadcast replays clearly showed White stepping out of bounds prior to tossing the ball to Butler. The Raiders also argued that Jordan never fully completed catching the football and the pass should have been ruled incomplete.

Although other players would perform the Leap, it was popularized by wide receiver Robert Brooks, who would do it after every touchdown he scored. When the NFL updated rules regarding excessive celebrations in 2000 and 2014, the Lambeau Leap was grandfathered into the new rules, permitting it to continue, because it was an individual act of celebration that did not take on the form of taunting.

== Safety concerns ==
A few safety concerns have been noted by past Packers players and commentators. Primarily, there have been concerns for the player performing the Leap, specifically as they come down off the wall. In 2003, during a renovation of Lambeau Field, the wall between the field and stands was lowered, allowing for an easier leap for players. Players have also noted that they have been touched inappropriately while performing the Leap and have had various drinks and food spilled on them. Many players have also had trouble completing the Leap, either crashing into the wall too hard or not jumping high enough. Due to the COVID-19 pandemic, the NFL removed fans from the first six to eight rows of the stands during the 2020 NFL season in order to limit possible interactions or exposure between players and fans. As a result, the Lambeau Leap was effectively banned for the whole season. This did not prevent players from leaping into the empty stands to reenact a Lambeau Leap.

== Legacy ==
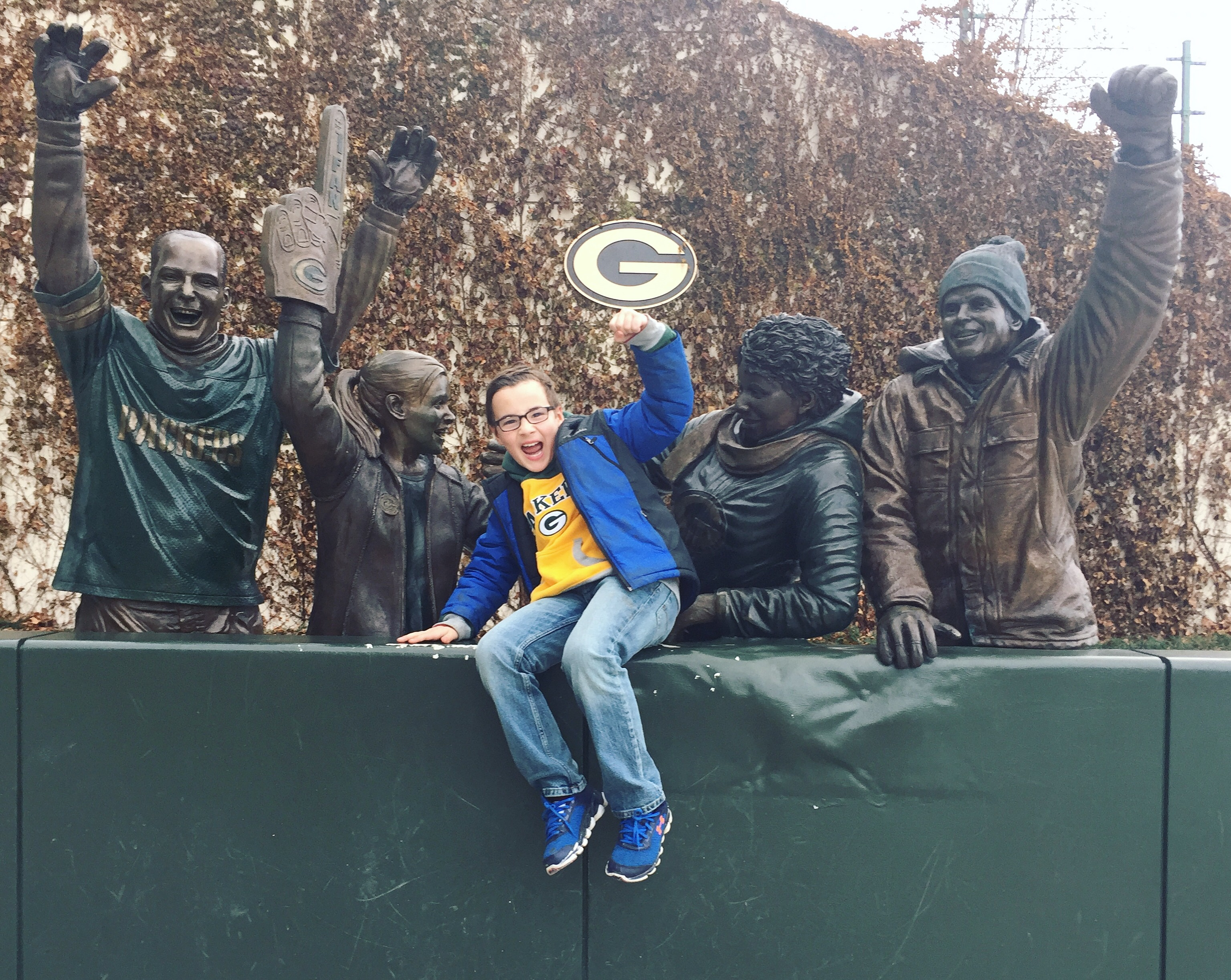
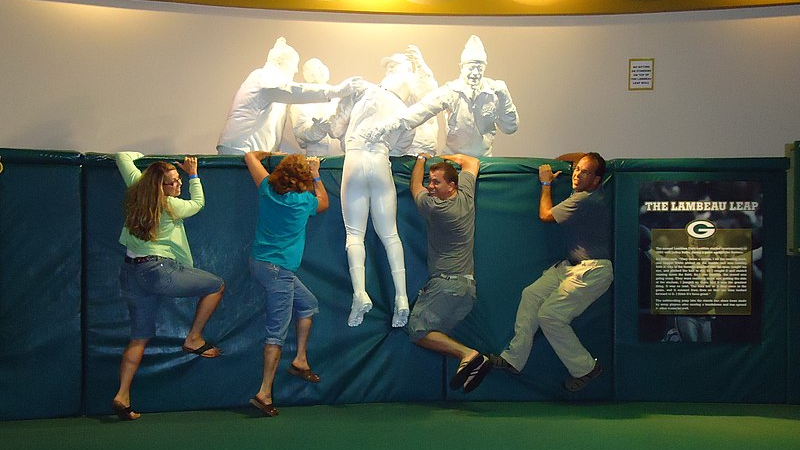
The Packers have two replica walls, one outside of Lambeau Field (top) and another in the Green Bay Packers Hall of Fame (bottom).

The Lambeau Leap has become an important part of the Green Bay Packers tradition. It is now an expectation that all Packers players who score at Lambeau Field perform the Leap. It also provides a connection between the players and the fans. In 2014, a statue was built outside of Lambeau Field commemorating the Leap. It featured a shortened replica of the end zone wall and four Packers fans, which allows visitors to pose for pictures while doing their own Lambeau Leap. Another replica wall was also built inside the Green Bay Packers Hall of Fame highlighting the history of the Leap while also allowing fans to perform their own Lambeau Leap.

The Packers have used the Lambeau Leap for various outreach events with fans. The Packers have hosted the Ultimate Lambeau Leap, a fundraiser event for the Special Olympics. In 2013, people who raised over $1,500 for the charity were given the opportunity to rappel down the side of Lambeau Field. Taking advantage of a pun on the word "leap", the Packers also promoted a Leap Day event on February 29, 2020, that allowed a select group of fans to perform the Lambeau Leap at Lambeau Field.

In 2020, the Milwaukee Journal Sentinel named the first Lambeau Leap as the 43rd greatest Wisconsin sports moment.

== Notable leaps ==
Occasionally, an opposing player will attempt a Lambeau Leap, with mixed results. During the 2007 NFC Championship game, New York Giants running back Brandon Jacobs faked a Lambeau Leap after scoring a touchdown, angering many Packers fans in the stands. Before a game against the Packers on September 20, 2009, Cincinnati Bengals wide receiver Chad Johnson, then known as Chad Ochocinco, announced he would do a Lambeau Leap if he scored a touchdown, and then followed through by leaping into the arms of pre-arranged fans wearing Bengals jerseys.

Packers kicker Mason Crosby performed his first career Lambeau Leap after kicking a game-winning field goal against the Detroit Lions in 2019. This was unique as it was Crosby's 13th season with the Packers and came after a field goal, not a touchdown.

== See also ==
- Touchdown celebrations
  - Ickey Shuffle
  - Spiking after scoring
