= Gabe Wilkins =

American football player (born 1971)

No. 98
- Positions: Defensive end, defensive tackle

Personal information
- Born: January 9, 1971 (age 55); Cowpens, South Carolina, U.S.
- Listed height: 6 ft 5 in (1.96 m)
- Listed weight: 305 lb (138 kg)

Career information
- High school: Broome (Spartanburg, South Carolina)
- College: Gardner–Webb
- NFL draft: 1994: 4th round, 126th overall pick

Career history
- Green Bay Packers (1994–1997); San Francisco 49ers (1998–1999)

Awards and highlights
- Super Bowl champion (XXXI)

Career NFL statistics
- Tackles: 124
- Sacks: 13.5
- Fumble recoveries: 3
- Stats at Pro Football Reference

Gabriel Nicholas Wilkins (born January 9, 1971) is an American former professional football player who was a defensive end for six seasons with the Green Bay Packers and San Francisco 49ers of the National Football League (NFL) from 1994 to 1999. He played college football for the Gardner–Webb Runnin' Bulldogs.

== Early life ==
He attended Gettys D. Broome High School in Spartanburg, South Carolina.

== College career ==
Attending NAIA Gardner–Webb University, Wilkins recorded 29 sacks and 53 tackles for loss (both school records), and participated in the 1992 NAIA Football Championship game.

== Professional career ==
=== Green Bay Packers ===
Wilkins was selected by the Green Bay Packers in the 1994 NFL draft (fourth round, 126th overall). After being used sparingly in his first three seasons, Wilkins performed well in relief of Reggie White during Super Bowl XXXI, recording a tackle and a deflected pass. Becoming a starter after Sean Jones retired in 1997, Wilkins finished the season with 50 tackles, 5.5 sacks, a 77-yard interception return touchdown, and a fumble recovery touchdown. However, Wilkins played only one drive of Super Bowl XXXII due to a knee injury.

=== San Francisco 49ers ===
Following the 1997 season, the San Francisco 49ers signed Wilkins to a 5-year, $20 million contract. After recording 30 tackles and a sack over two years in San Francisco and being injured late in his career, Wilkins retired after the 1999 season.

== NFL career statistics ==
Legend
	Won the Super Bowl
**Bold**	Career high

=== Regular season ===
Year	Team	Games		Tackles				Interceptions				Fumbles			
Year	Team	GP	GS	Comb	Solo	Ast	Sck	Int	Yds	TD	Lng	FF	FR	Yds	TD
1994	GNB	15	0	4	3	1	1.0	0	0	0	0	0	0	0	0
1995	GNB	13	8	15	12	3	3.0	0	0	0	0	0	0	0	0
1996	GNB	16	1	19	12	7	3.0	0	0	0	0	**2**	0	0	0
1997	GNB	16	16	**50**	**30**	**20**	**5.5**	**1**	**77**	**1**	**77**	1	**3**	**1**	**1**
1998	SFO	8	4	10	10	0	0.0	0	0	0	0	0	0	0	0
1999	SFO	16	15	26	17	9	1.0	0	0	0	0	0	0	0	0
		84	44	124	84	40	13.5	1	77	1	77	3	3	1	1

== Post-career life ==
Wilkins now lives in Spartanburg, South Carolina, with his wife and four daughters.
