= Bernardo Harris =

American football player (born 1971)

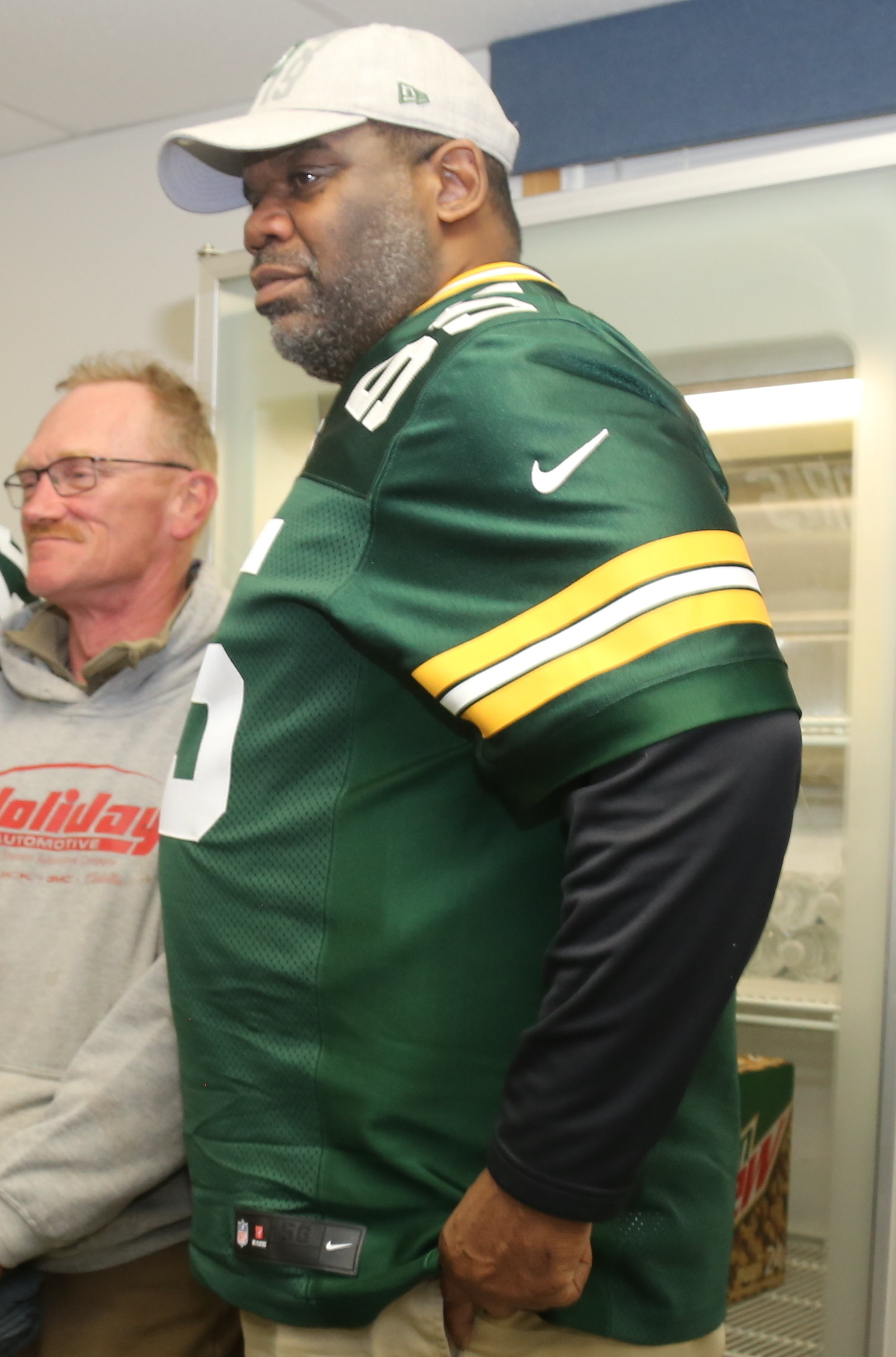
- Harris at Fort McCoy, Wisconsin in 2019

No. 54, 55, 51
- Position: Linebacker

Personal information
- Born: October 15, 1971 (age 55); Chapel Hill, North Carolina, U.S.
- Listed height: 6 ft 2 in (1.88 m)
- Listed weight: 247 lb (112 kg)

Career information
- High school: Chapel Hill
- College: North Carolina
- NFL draft: 1994: undrafted

Career history
- Kansas City Chiefs (1994)*; Green Bay Packers (1995–2001); Baltimore Ravens (2002–2003)
- * Offseason or practice squad member only

Awards and highlights
- Super Bowl champion (XXXI); Second-team All-ACC (1993)

Career NFL statistics
- Tackles: 612
- Sacks: 9.5
- Interceptions: 5
- Stats at Pro Football Reference

Bernardo Harris (born October 15, 1971) is an American former professional football player who was a linebacker in the National Football League. He attended Chapel Hill High School, graduating in 1990. He was recruited by Mack Brown to play college football for the North Carolina Tar Heels football. After not being drafted, he was signed as a free agent by the Kansas City Chiefs in 1994. At Kansas City, Harris injured his knee in the first week of training camp and was out of football.

Bernardo Harris became a free agent and was signed by the Green Bay Packers in 1995, playing in eleven games his rookie season. Harris played for the Packers for seven seasons and played on the 1996 Super Bowl XXXI and 1997 Super Bowl XXXII teams.

In 2002, Harris was signed as a free agent by the Baltimore Ravens, after a shoulder injury to Ray Lewis. In 2003, Bernardo Harris was placed on the injured reserved and subsequently retired.

== NFL career statistics ==
Legend
| | Won the Super Bowl |
| **Bold** | Career high |

=== Regular season ===
| Year | Team | Games | | Tackles | | | | Interceptions | | | | Fumbles | | | |
| Year | Team | GP | GS | Comb | Solo | Ast | Sck | Int | Yds | TD | Lng | FF | FR | Yds | TD |
|---|---|---|---|---|---|---|---|---|---|---|---|---|---|---|---|
| 1995 | GNB | 11 | 0 | 5 | 4 | 1 | 0.0 | 0 | 0 | 0 | 0 | 0 | 0 | 0 | 0 |
| 1996 | GNB | 16 | 0 | 8 | 7 | 1 | 0.0 | 0 | 0 | 0 | 0 | 0 | 0 | 0 | 0 |
| 1997 | GNB | 16 | 16 | **113** | 65 | **48** | 1.0 | 1 | 0 | 0 | 0 | 0 | 0 | 0 | 0 |
| 1998 | GNB | 16 | 16 | 105 | 67 | 38 | 2.0 | 0 | 0 | 0 | 0 | 0 | 0 | 0 | 0 |
| 1999 | GNB | 16 | 15 | 109 | 72 | 37 | 0.0 | 0 | 0 | 0 | 0 | **1** | 1 | 0 | 0 |
| 2000 | GNB | 16 | 16 | 97 | **76** | 21 | 2.0 | 0 | 0 | 0 | 0 | **1** | 0 | 0 | 0 |
| 2001 | GNB | 16 | 16 | 98 | 69 | 29 | **2.5** | **2** | **12** | 0 | 8 | **1** | **3** | 0 | 0 |
| 2002 | BAL | 13 | 10 | 77 | 62 | 15 | 2.0 | **2** | 11 | 0 | **11** | 0 | 0 | 0 | 0 |
| | | 120 | 89 | 612 | 422 | 190 | 9.5 | 5 | 23 | 0 | 11 | 3 | 4 | 0 | 0 |

=== Playoffs ===
| Year | Team | Games | | Tackles | | | | Interceptions | | | | Fumbles | | | |
| Year | Team | GP | GS | Comb | Solo | Ast | Sck | Int | Yds | TD | Lng | FF | FR | Yds | TD |
|---|---|---|---|---|---|---|---|---|---|---|---|---|---|---|---|
| 1995 | GNB | 3 | 0 | 2 | 2 | 0 | 0.0 | 0 | 0 | 0 | 0 | 0 | 0 | 0 | 0 |
| 1996 | GNB | 3 | 0 | 0 | 0 | 0 | 0.0 | 0 | 0 | 0 | 0 | 0 | 0 | 0 | 0 |
| 1997 | GNB | 3 | 3 | 7 | 5 | **2** | **1.0** | 0 | 0 | 0 | 0 | 0 | 0 | 0 | 0 |
| 1998 | GNB | 1 | 1 | **8** | **7** | 1 | 0.5 | 0 | 0 | 0 | 0 | 0 | 0 | 0 | 0 |
| 2001 | GNB | 2 | 2 | 7 | 6 | 1 | 0.0 | 0 | 0 | 0 | 0 | 0 | 0 | 0 | 0 |
| | | 12 | 6 | 24 | 20 | 4 | 1.5 | 0 | 0 | 0 | 0 | 0 | 0 | 0 | 0 |
