= Craig Newsome =

American football player (born 1971)

No. 21, 27
- Position: Cornerback

Personal information
- Born: August 10, 1971 (age 55); San Bernardino, California, U.S.
- Listed height: 6 ft 0 in (1.83 m)
- Listed weight: 190 lb (86 kg)

Career information
- High school: Eisenhower (Rialto, California)
- College: Arizona State
- NFL draft: 1995: 1st round, 32nd overall pick

Career history
- Green Bay Packers (1995–1998); San Francisco 49ers (1999)

Awards and highlights
- Super Bowl Champion (XXXI); First-Team All-Pac-10 (1993); All-Madden Team (1995)

Career NFL statistics
- Tackles: 219
- Interceptions: 4
- Forced fumbles: 1
- Stats at Pro Football Reference

Craig Newsome (born August 10, 1971) is an American former professional football player who was a cornerback in the National Football League (NFL). He was selected in the first round of the 1995 NFL draft by the Green Bay Packers, where he played for four years. He won Super Bowl XXXI with the Packers, beating the New England Patriots. He was later traded to the San Francisco 49ers in 1999.

== Amateur career ==
Newsome played for Eisenhower High School in Rialto, California, the same high school as Ronnie Lott, and attended San Bernardino Valley College before transferring to Arizona State.

== NFL career ==
Pre-draft measurables
Height	Weight	Arm length	Hand span	40-yard dash	10-yard split	20-yard split	20-yard shuttle	Vertical jump	Broad jump	Bench press
5 ft 11 1/2 in (1.82 m)	185 lb (84 kg)	31 in (0.79 m)	8 5/8 in (0.22 m)	4.74 s	1.70 s	2.73 s	4.56 s	32.0 in (0.81 m)	9 ft 7 in (2.92 m)	9 reps
All values from NFL Combine

The Packers selected Newsome in the first round with the 32nd pick in the 1995 NFL draft. He was the starting cornerback on the 1996 Green Bay Packers championship team. He also had a forced fumble and an interception in Super Bowl XXXI. On September 19, 1999, the Packers traded Newsome to the 49ers. Newsome was forced into retirement after the 1999 season, as three shattered vertebrae left him physically disabled.

== NFL career statistics ==
Legend
**Bold**	Career high

=== Regular season ===
Year	Team	Games		Tackles					Interceptions					Fumbles			
Year	Team	GP	GS	Cmb	Solo	Ast	Sck	TFL	Int	Yds	TD	Lng	PD	FF	FR	Yds	TD
1995	GNB	16	16	**75**	54	**21**	0.0	-	1	3	0	3	-	0	0	0	0
1996	GNB	16	16	71	**61**	10	0.0	-	**2**	22	0	20	-	**1**	**1**	0	0
1997	GNB	1	1	0	0	0	0.0	-	0	0	0	0	0	0	0	0	0
1998	GNB	13	13	57	49	8	0.0	-	1	**26**	0	**26**	-	0	0	0	0
1999	SFO	7	2	16	13	3	0.0	**3**	0	0	0	0	0	0	0	0	0
		53	48	219	177	42	0.0	3	4	51	0	26	0	1	1	0	0

=== Playoffs ===
Year	Team	Games		Tackles					Interceptions					Fumbles			
Year	Team	GP	GS	Cmb	Solo	Ast	Sck	TFL	Int	Yds	TD	Lng	PD	FF	FR	Yds	TD
1995	GNB	3	3	**15**	**14**	**1**	0.0	-	1	0	0	0	0	0	**1**	**31**	**1**
1996	GNB	3	3	7	6	**1**	0.0	-	**3**	**40**	0	**35**	0	0	0	0	0
1998	GNB	1	1	4	4	0	0.0	-	0	0	0	0	0	0	0	0	0
		7	7	26	24	2	0.0	0	4	40	0	35	0	0	1	31	1

== Post NFL career ==
Newsome coached the La Crosse River Rats of the Indoor Football League in 2000, located in La Crosse Wisconsin. He currently resides in Holmen, Wisconsin where he is a coach on the Holmen High School football team.
