= Michael Robinson (cornerback) =

American football player (born 1973)

No. 46
- Position: Cornerback

Personal information
- Born: June 24, 1973 (age 53); Richmond, Virginia, U.S.
- Listed height: 6 ft 1 in (1.85 m)
- Listed weight: 192 lb (87 kg)

Career information
- High school: King and Queen Central
- College: Hampton
- NFL draft: 1996: undrafted

Career history
- Minnesota Vikings (1996)*; Green Bay Packers (1996)
- * Offseason or practice squad member only

Awards and highlights
- Super Bowl champion (XXXI)

Career NFL statistics
- Tackles: 2
- Stats at Pro Football Reference

Michael F. Robinson (born June 24, 1973) is an American former professional football player who was a cornerback for the Green Bay Packers of the National Football League (NFL) in 1996, when they won Super Bowl XXXI. Robinson played college football for the Hampton Pirates.
