= Brian Williams (linebacker) =

American football player (born 1972)

No. 51, 99
- Position: Linebacker

Personal information
- Born: December 17, 1972 (age 53); Dallas, Texas, U.S.
- Listed height: 6 ft 1 in (1.85 m)
- Listed weight: 243 lb (110 kg)

Career information
- High school: Bishop Dunne Catholic School (Dallas)
- College: USC
- NFL draft: 1995: 3rd round, 73rd overall pick

Career history
- Green Bay Packers (1995–2000); Jacksonville Jaguars (2001)*; New Orleans Saints (2001); Detroit Lions (2001-2003)
- * Offseason or practice squad member only

Awards and highlights
- Super Bowl champion (XXXI); All-Pro (1997); Second-team All-Pac-10 (1994)

Career NFL statistics
- Tackles: 414
- Sacks: 6
- Interceptions: 4
- Stats at Pro Football Reference

Brian Marcee Williams (born December 17, 1972) is an American former professional football player who was a linebacker in the National Football League (NFL). He played college football for the USC Trojans.

== College career ==
Williams played college football at the University of Southern California.

== Professional career ==
Williams was selected in the third round of the 1995 NFL draft. Williams played for the Green Bay Packers, the Detroit Lions and the New Orleans Saints between 1995 and 2002.

== NFL career statistics ==
Legend
	Won the Super Bowl
**Bold**	Career high

=== Regular season ===
Year	Team	Games		Tackles				Interceptions				Fumbles			
Year	Team	GP	GS	Comb	Solo	Ast	Sck	Int	Yds	TD	Lng	FF	FR	Yds	TD
1995	GNB	13	0	0	0	0	0.0	0	0	0	0	0	0	0	0
1996	GNB	16	16	83	52	31	0.5	0	0	0	0	0	**3**	0	0
1997	GNB	16	16	100	62	**38**	1.0	**2**	30	0	25	0	1	0	0
1998	GNB	16	15	**108**	**77**	31	**2.0**	0	0	0	0	**2**	0	0	0
1999	GNB	7	7	70	48	22	**2.0**	**2**	**60**	0	**60**	0	1	0	0
2000	GNB	4	3	25	17	8	0.5	0	0	0	0	1	1	0	0
2001	NOR	4	0	0	0	0	0.0	0	0	0	0	0	1	0	0
2001	DET	2	1	17	15	2	0.0	0	0	0	0	0	0	0	0
2002	DET	3	3	11	8	3	0.0	0	0	0	0	0	0	0	0
Career		81	61	414	279	135	6.0	4	90	0	60	3	7	0	0

=== Postseason ===
Year	Team	Games		Tackles				Interceptions				Fumbles			
Year	Team	GP	GS	Comb	Solo	Ast	Sck	Int	Yds	TD	Lng	FF	FR	Yds	TD
1995	GNB	3	0	0	0	0	0.0	0	0	0	0	0	0	0	0
1996	GNB	3	3	**11**	**11**	0	0.0	**1**	**16**	0	**16**	0	**1**	0	0
1997	GNB	3	3	10	9	**1**	0.0	0	0	0	0	0	0	0	0
1998	GNB	1	1	6	6	0	0.0	0	0	0	0	0	0	0	0
Career		10	7	27	26	1	0.0	1	16	0	16	0	1	0	0
