= Robert Brooks (American football) =

American football player (born 1970)

No. 87, 85
- Position: Wide receiver

Personal information
- Born: June 23, 1970 (age 56); Greenwood, South Carolina, U.S.
- Listed height: 6 ft 0 in (1.83 m)
- Listed weight: 180 lb (82 kg)

Career information
- High school: Greenwood
- College: South Carolina
- NFL draft: 1992: 3rd round, 62nd overall pick

Career history
- Green Bay Packers (1992–1998); Denver Broncos (2000)

Awards and highlights
- Super Bowl champion (XXXI); Green Bay Packers Hall of Fame; PFWA Comeback Player of the Year (1997); First Team All-South Independent(1991); NFL record: Longest receiving touchdown: 99 yards (tied)

Career NFL statistics
- Receptions: 309
- Receiving yards: 4,276
- Receiving touchdowns: 32
- Stats at Pro Football Reference

Robert Darren Brooks (born June 23, 1970) is an American former professional football player who was a wide receiver in the National Football League (NFL). He played college football for the South Carolina Gamecocks. Brooks played in the NFL for the Green Bay Packers (1992–1998) and the Denver Broncos.

== Early life ==
Brooks started playing football in a pee wee league at the age of six. He then moved on to playing at Northside Junior High. He played running back until he reached college. In his senior year at Greenwood high school, he scored 14 touchdowns and gained over 700 yards. He was also a state champion track star in high school. He was considered one of the best track athletes in the world after winning the 110 meter high hurdles with a time of 13.9 seconds at the Keebler International Prep Track and Field Invitational in June 1988.

== College career ==
Brooks played collegiately for the University of South Carolina (1988–1991). He was a fan favorite throughout his college career, Brooks was known for his fluid running and sure hands. He was a Freshman All-American in 1988. Originally recruited as a running back, Brooks took to the field at wide receiver wearing the jersey number 49 for the Gamecocks. During the 1988 season, Brooks, then a freshman, made an exceptional over-the-shoulder one-handed catch for a touchdown against the Georgia Bulldogs.

== Professional career ==
Pre-draft measurables
Height	Weight	Arm length	Hand span	40-yard dash	10-yard split	20-yard split	20-yard shuttle	Vertical jump
6 ft 0 in (1.83 m)	175 lb (79 kg)	31 3/8 in (0.80 m)	9 5/8 in (0.24 m)	4.64 s	1.65 s	2.70 s	4.18 s	37.0 in (0.94 m)

Brooks was drafted in the third round, 62nd overall, of the 1992 NFL draft to the Green Bay Packers. He played for the Green Bay Packers (1992–1998) and the Denver Broncos (2000). He led the NFL in kickoff returns in 1993 with a 26.6-yard average. He came into his own in 1995, following a career-ending injury to teammate Sterling Sharpe. That year, he led the Packers with 102 receptions and 13 touchdowns, while racking up 1,497 receiving yards, a franchise record that stood until broken by Jordy Nelson in 2014. During the 1995 season, Brooks caught a 99-yard pass play from Brett Favre during a Monday Night Football game against the Chicago Bears September 11, 1995. This reception currently ties the records for longest pass play from scrimmage with twelve other receivers.

Brooks suffered a severe knee injury in week 7 of the 1996 season against the San Francisco 49ers, when Niners cornerback Tyronne Drakeford fought off a block and pulled him down tearing his anterior cruciate ligament and patellar tendon on the play. He missed the remainder of the season, and was unable to play in Super Bowl XXXI. The Packers beat the New England Patriots 35–21. Brooks vowed to return the next season, and in 1997 he won the NFL Comeback Player of the Year award, catching 60 passes for 1,010 yards and 7 touchdowns.

Brooks later developed back problems as he was forced to change his running mechanics. He suffered through a painful season in 1998, and briefly retired before attempting a comeback with the Broncos in 2000. He appeared in only a handful of games in Denver, before again retiring from the NFL. He finished his career with 309 receptions, 4,276 yards, and 32 touchdowns. In 2007, he was inducted into the Green Bay Packers Hall of Fame.

Brooks popularized the Lambeau Leap touchdown celebration.

As of 2019's NFL off-season, Robert Brooks held at least 3 Packers franchise records, including:

- Most Punt Ret Yds (playoff career): 214
- Most 100+ yard receiving games (season): 11 (1995, two in postseason)
- Most 100+ yard receiving games (playoffs): 3 (tied with Antonio Freeman and Greg Jennings)

== NFL career statistics ==
Legend
	Won the Super Bowl
	Led the league
**Bold**	Career high

=== Regular season ===
Year	Team	Games		Receiving				
Year	Team	GP	GS	Rec	Yds	Avg	Lng	TD
1992	GNB	**16**	1	12	126	10.5	18	1
1993	GNB	14	0	20	180	9.0	25	0
1994	GNB	**16**	**16**	58	648	11.2	35	4
1995	GNB	**16**	**16**	**102**	**1,497**	14.7	**99**	**13**
1996	GNB	7	7	23	344	15.0	38	4
1997	GNB	15	15	60	1,010	16.8	48	7
1998	GNB	12	12	31	420	13.5	30	3
2000	DEN	4	0	3	51	**17.0**	25	0
		100	67	309	4,276	13.8	99	32

=== Playoffs ===
Year	Team	Games		Receiving				
Year	Team	GP	GS	Rec	Yds	Avg	Lng	TD
1993	GNB	2	0	4	40	10.0	17	1
1994	GNB	2	2	15	226	15.1	59	0
1995	GNB	**3**	**3**	**17**	**281**	**16.5**	**73**	**3**
1997	GNB	**3**	**3**	7	73	10.4	21	0
1998	GNB	1	1	2	31	15.5	24	0
		11	9	45	651	14.5	73	4

== Post-football career ==
After his professional football career ended, members of Brooks family called him about going into the music industry, using the nickname “Shoo-in” which he had developed during his football-playing days. Brooks created the record label “Shoo-in 4 Life”. He also has produced two CD's entitled Jump and Down wit’ tha Bay. He is the wide receivers coach at Brophy College Preparatory, a high school in Phoenix Arizona. Brooks is now married and the father of three children — Robert, Elisha and Austin — residing in the Menomonie, WI area. He has become the minister of The River Of Life Church in Menomonie, WI
