= Matthew Dorsett =

American football player (born 1973)

No. 23
- Position: Cornerback

Personal information
- Born: August 23, 1973 (age 53); New Orleans, Louisiana, U.S.
- Listed height: 5 ft 11 in (1.80 m)
- Listed weight: 187 lb (85 kg)

Career information
- High school: Eleanor McMain (New Orleans)
- College: Southern
- NFL draft: 1995: undrafted

Career history
- Green Bay Packers (1995–1997); Kansas City Chiefs (1998)*; Nashville Kats (1999)
- * Offseason or practice squad member only

Awards and highlights
- Super Bowl champion (XXXI); Southern University HOF (2011)
- Stats at Pro Football Reference

Matthew Herbert Dorsett (born August 23, 1973) is an American former professional football player who was a cornerback for the Green Bay Packers of the National Football League (NFL). Dorsett signed as a free agent with the Packers. Dorsett was highly touted for his bump and run coverage abilities. Dorsett garnered the nickname "Baby Time" for his tenacious bump and run coverage.

Dorsett played college football for the Southern Jaguars. In the 1994 Heritage Bowl, he returned a fumble 12 yards for the game's only touchdown, leading the Jaguars to an 11–0 win over South Carolina State.

Dorsett signed with the Green Bay Packers as an undrafted free agent in 1995, recording 10 special team tackles in 10 games as a rookie. He intercepted Brett Favre, the reigning NFL Most Valuable Player, while playing with the second-team defense in an intrasquad scrimmage in 1996. However, he spent the entire 1996 season on the injured reserve list after tearing his anterior cruciate ligament in the preseason against the Pittsburgh Steelers. Dorsett was released on July 18, 1997. Dorsett signed with the Kansas City Chiefs in April 1998. He was later released on August 25. Dorsett signed with the Nashville Kats of the Arena Football League in June 1999. After just two days of practice, he recorded a team-record 14 tackles, along with four passes defended, in his team debut against the Arizona Rattlers.
