= Roderick Mullen =

American football player (born 1972)

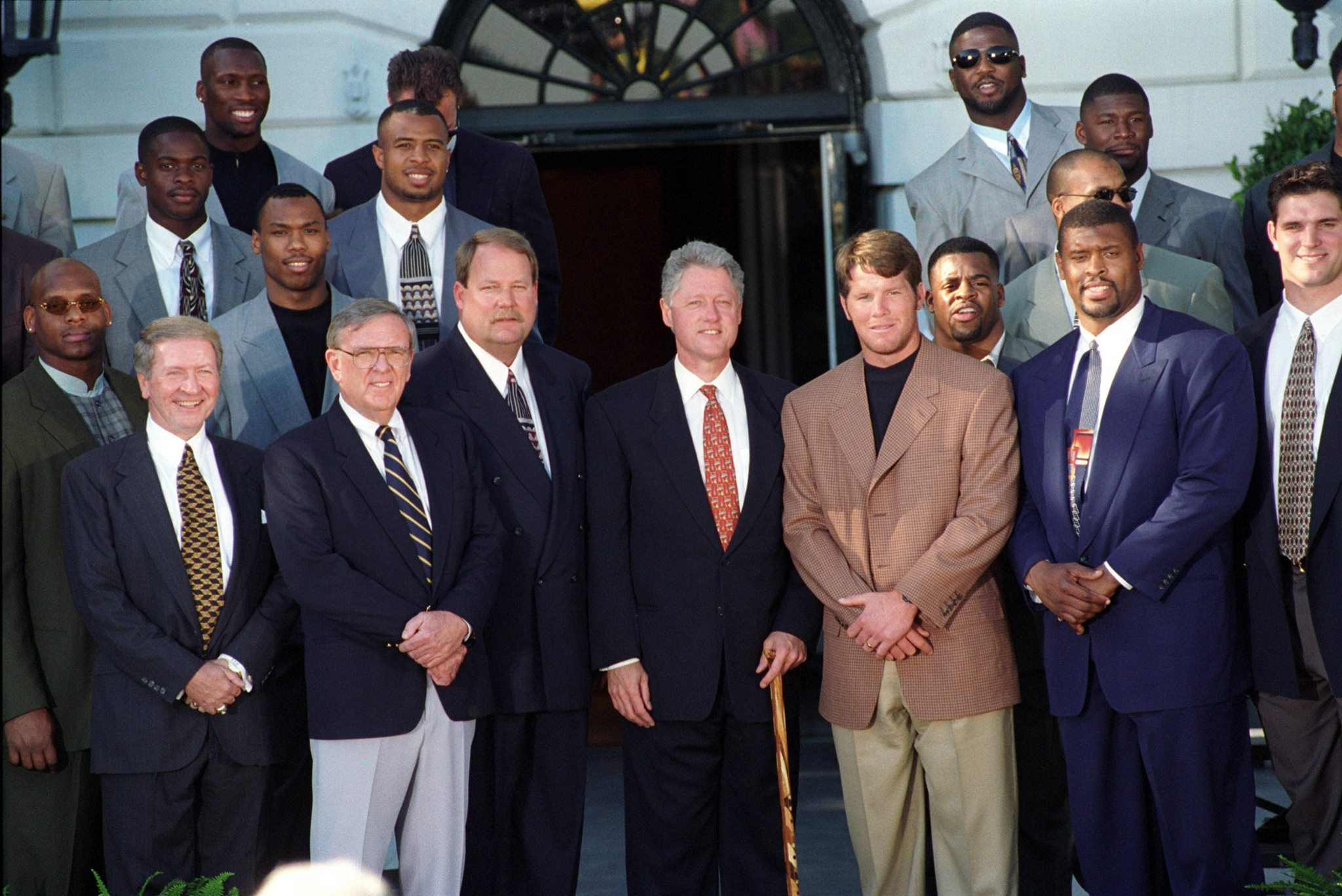
- Mullen in 1997

No. 28
- Position: Cornerback

Personal information
- Born: December 5, 1972 (age 53); Baton Rouge, Louisiana, U.S.
- Listed height: 6 ft 1 in (1.85 m)
- Listed weight: 202 lb (92 kg)

Career information
- High school: West Feliciana
- College: Grambling State
- NFL draft: 1995: 5th round, 153rd overall pick

Career history
- New York Giants (1995)*; Green Bay Packers (1995–1998); Carolina Panthers (1999); Minnesota Vikings (2000)*
- * Offseason or practice squad member only

Awards and highlights
- Super Bowl champion (XXXI)

Career NFL statistics
- Tackles: 71
- Interceptions: 1
- Fumble recoveries: 1
- Stats at Pro Football Reference

Roderick Louis Mullen (born December 5, 1972) is an American former professional football player who was a cornerback for the Green Bay Packers from 1995 to 1998 and Carolina Panthers in 1999 in the National Football League (NFL). With the Packers, he became a champion in Super Bowl XXXI. He played college football for the Grambling State Tigers.

== Professional career ==
=== New York Giants ===
Mullen was selected by the New York Giants in the 1995 NFL draft (fifth round, 153rd overall). Mullen was cut by the Giants on August 28, 1995. He was later signed to the practice squad.

=== Green Bay Packers ===
The Green Bay Packers signed Mullen off the Giants' practice squad in late October 1995. He made three tackles that first partial season. In 1996, Mullen played in 14 games as part of the Packers' Super Bowl XXXI championship team. Playing in nickel and dime situations as well as on special teams, he contributed in all 16 games in 1997. Mullen did not play at all in 1998 with a dislocated shoulder. After 1998, Mullen left the team.

=== Carolina Panthers ===
Ending his time as an unrestricted free agent, Mullen was signed by the Carolina Panthers in March 1999. He recorded 24 tackles in 15 games played in his lone season with the Panthers.

=== Minnesota Vikings ===
On June 15, 2000, the Minnesota Vikings signed Mullen. He was cut by the Vikings on August 27, 2000.

== Post-career life ==
After ending his playing career, Mullen invested in Subway as a restaurant franchiser near Los Angeles. He then relocated to Dallas and is now working as an executive for a gym company in the area.
