= Brian Satterfield =

American football player (born 1969)

No. 38
- Position: Fullback

Personal information
- Born: December 22, 1969 (age 56); Ducktown, Tennessee, U.S.
- Listed height: 6 ft 0 in (1.83 m)
- Listed weight: 225 lb (102 kg)

Career information
- High school: Fannin County (Blue Ridge, Georgia)
- College: North Alabama (1989–1993)
- NFL draft: 1994: undrafted

Career history
- Washington Redskins (1994)*; Green Bay Packers (1995–1996)
- * Offseason or practice squad member only

Awards and highlights
- Super Bowl champion (XXXI); NCAA Division II national champion (1993)
- Stats at Pro Football Reference

Brian Sydney Satterfield (born December 22, 1969) is an American former professional football player. A fullback, he played college football for the North Alabama Lions, winning the NCAA Division II national championship as a senior in 1993. He then signed with the Washington Redskins of the National Football League (NFL), but left the team during training camp. He returned to football in 1995 and signed with the Green Bay Packers. After being injured for the duration of the 1995 season, he played in his only career game in 1996 before another season-ending injury.

== Early life ==
Satterfield was born on December 22, 1969, in Ducktown, Tennessee. He attended Fannin County High School in Blue Ridge, Georgia, and after graduating from there, began attending the University of North Alabama (UNA) in 1989. He joined the North Alabama Lions football team, starting his freshman season as the backup fullback. That year, he ran 88 times for 390 yards and scored four touchdowns, averaging 4.4 yards per carry.

The following season, Satterfield helped the Lions reach the NCAA Division II playoffs while running 83 times for 374 yards, scoring six touchdowns, and averaging 4.4 yards per carry. He did not play during the 1991 season. He returned in 1992 and helped the Lions reach the NCAA playoffs again, running 147 times for 935 yards and recording a team-leading eight touchdowns. He averaged 6.4 yards per carry and was named first-team All-Gulf South Conference (GSC).

Satterfield opened his senior season by running for a school-record 243 yards and three touchdowns against Fort Valley State, but three weeks later suffered an injury which caused him to miss several games and limited him after his return. He attempted an early return against Central Arkansas, which worsened his injury. Nonetheless, he eventually came back and finished the season having totaled 147 carries for 1,087 yards and four touchdowns, an average of 7.4 yards per carry. He led the Lions to a perfect record of 14–0 and an appearance in the national championship, where he ran for 180 yards and two touchdowns in their defeat of the IUP Crimson Hawks.

Satterfield concluded his collegiate career having run for 2,817 yards, third in school history. He was named the school's male athlete of the year as a senior. He was named to the GSC 1990s Team of the Decade and to UNA's 50th anniversary all-time team. He was later inducted into the North Alabama Hall of Fame in 2012.

== Professional career ==
After going unselected in the 1994 NFL draft, Satterfield, along with North Alabama teammate Tyrone Rush, signed with the Washington Redskins as an undrafted free agent. He impressed in training camp for his blocking and receiving abilities and passed Cedric Smith on the depth chart. In a scrimmage against the Pittsburgh Steelers, he ran for a touchdown and caught three passes for 27 yards. However, towards the end of July, he abruptly announced that he was leaving the team, explaining that his "heart wasn't in it". He later noted that he had, per Pete Dougherty of the Green Bay Press-Gazette, "lingering knee and ankle injuries and a feeling he mentally was drained".

Satterfield returned home to Florence, Alabama, and began working for the United Parcel Service. He stopped working out for four months to recover from his injuries, and at the end of the year became interested in playing again. His agent contacted the Green Bay Packers, and he worked out with the team in January 1995. Although he was "out of shape", according to the Press-Gazette, and ran a slow 40-yard dash of 4.6 seconds, the team was interested enough in him and had him signed. He "quietly became one of their biggest surprises", according to the Press-Gazette, but in preseason, against the Steelers, "his left hamstring exploded". His injury had previously ended the careers of two other Packers, but Satterfield received surgery, and although he missed the entire 1995 season, was able to recover in time for offseason minicamp in 1996. While recovering from the injury, he began weight training and became one of the strongest players on the team, being able to rep 315 pounds (143 kg) 17 times on the bench press, one behind the team-best. He made the final roster and made his NFL debut in the team's season-opening win against the Tampa Bay Buccaneers, being used on special teams. However, he pulled his hamstring and was placed on injured reserve on September 4, 1996, ending his season. He was then released from injured reserve on December 3, ending his professional career.

== Personal life ==
Satterfield is married and has two children with his wife, Melanie. They live in Blue Ridge, Georgia. Satterfield's son Peyton also played college football for the North Alabama Lions.
