= Reggie White =

American football player (1961–2004)

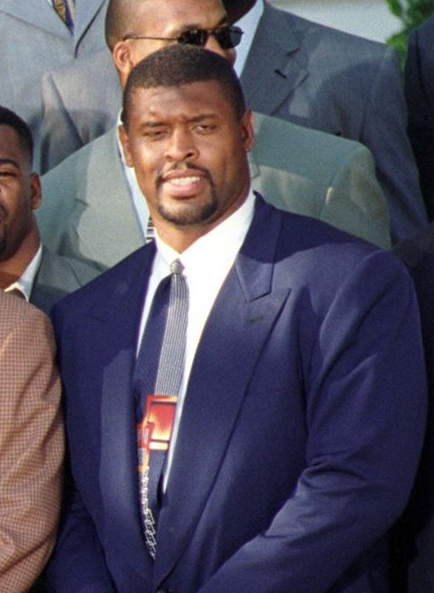
- White in 1997

No. 92, 91
- Position: Defensive end

Personal information
- Born: December 19, 1961; Chattanooga, Tennessee, U.S.
- Died: December 26, 2004 (aged 43); Cornelius, North Carolina, U.S.
- Listed height: 6 ft 5 in (1.96 m)
- Listed weight: 291 lb (132 kg)

Career information
- High school: Howard (Chattanooga)
- College: Tennessee (1980–1983)
- Supplemental draft: 1984: 1st round, 4th overall pick

Career history
- Memphis Showboats (1984–1985); Philadelphia Eagles (1985–1992); Green Bay Packers (1993–1998); Carolina Panthers (2000)

Awards and highlights
- Super Bowl champion (XXXI); 2× NFL Defensive Player of the Year (1987, 1998); 3× UPI NFC Defensive Player of the Year (1987, 1991, 1995); 8× First-team All-Pro (1986–1991, 1995, 1998); 5× Second-team All-Pro (1992–1994, 1996, 1997); 13× Pro Bowl (1986–1998); 2× NFL sacks leader (1987, 1988); NFL 1980s All-Decade Team; NFL 1990s All-Decade Team; NFL 75th Anniversary All-Time Team; NFL 100th Anniversary All-Time Team; Philadelphia Eagles Hall of Fame; Philadelphia Eagles 75th Anniversary Team; Philadelphia Eagles No. 92 retired; Green Bay Packers Hall of Fame; Green Bay Packers No. 92 retired; USFL Man of the Year (1985); First-team All-USFL (1985); Unanimous All-American (1983); SEC Player of the Year (1983); First-team All-SEC (1983); Tennessee Volunteers No. 92 retired; NFL records: Consec. seasons leading NFL in sacks: 2 (Note: Tied with Mark Gastineau and T. J. Watt); Most consecutive seasons with 10+ sacks: 9; Most seasons with 15+ sacks: 5

Career NFL statistics
- Tackles: 1,111
- Sacks: 198
- Forced fumbles: 15
- Fumble recoveries: 20
- Interceptions: 3
- Defensive touchdowns: 2
- Stats at Pro Football Reference
- Pro Football Hall of Fame
- College Football Hall of Fame

Reginald Howard White (December 19, 1961 – December 26, 2004) was an American professional football player who was a defensive end in the National Football League (NFL) for 15 seasons. White played college football for the Tennessee Volunteers, earning unanimous All-American honors. After playing two seasons for the Memphis Showboats of the United States Football League (USFL), he was selected in the first round of the 1984 NFL Supplemental Draft, and then played for the Philadelphia Eagles, the Green Bay Packers and the Carolina Panthers, becoming one of the most awarded defensive players in NFL history.

The two-time NFL Defensive Player of the Year, Super Bowl XXXI champion, 13-time Pro Bowl, and 13-time All-Pro selection holds second place all-time among NFL career sack leaders with 198. He was selected to the NFL 75th Anniversary All-Time Team, NFL 100th Anniversary All-Time Team, NFL 1990s All-Decade Team, and the NFL 1980s All-Decade Team. During his professional career, White is credited with pioneering free agency in sports. Outside of football he was also known for his Christian ministry as an ordained evangelical minister, leading to his nickname, "the Minister of Defense". White is a member of the College Football Hall of Fame and the Pro Football Hall of Fame.

== Early life ==
White was born and raised in Chattanooga, Tennessee. He played high school football at Howard High School under Coach Robert Pulliam, a former defensive lineman at Tennessee. During his senior year with the Hustlin' Tigers, White recorded 140 tackles (88 solo) and 10 sacks, and received All-American honors. He was rated the number one recruit in Tennessee by the Knoxville News Sentinel.

Reggie's mother, Thelma Collier, told Sports Illustrated that when he was 12 years old he announced to his family that he wanted to be two things: a football player and a minister.

== College career ==
White played college football at Tennessee from 1980 to 1983. He had worked hard into the starting lineup by the end of his freshman year, in which he registered 51 tackles (32 solo) and two sacks, recovered two fumbles, and blocked a punt that set up Tennessee's first score in the team's 23–10 win over then-rival Georgia Tech. He received the Andy Spiva Award, given annually to the Vols' most improved defensive player.

As a sophomore during the 1981 season, White registered 95 tackles (61 solo), a team-leading eight sacks, and a team-leading seven tackles-for-loss (of yards). He also blocked three extra-point attempts. He had 10 tackles and two sacks, one of which resulted in a safety, against Memphis State, and was named the team's "outstanding defensive player" for the game. For his performance in Tennessee's 10–7 win over Georgia Tech, which included a late fumble-recovery that sealed the Vols' victory, he was pronounced "Southeast Lineman of the Week" by UPI. White had eight tackles in Tennessee's 28–21 victory over Wisconsin in the 1981 Garden State Bowl, and was named the game's "Best Defensive Player". At the end of the 1981 season, he was named to the Sophomore All-American team by The Football News.

White was named a Preseason All-American going into the 1982 season, but was consistently bothered by an ankle injury, and his production dropped off. While he registered only 47 tackles (36 solo), he nevertheless led the team with seven sacks, and was third only to teammates Mike Cofer and Carlton Peoples in "big plays". His best game of the season came in the Vols' 24–24 tie against LSU, in which he registered eight tackles, including a sack and a fourth-down stop. He had eight tackles, two sacks, and a forced fumble in Tennessee's 28–22 loss to Iowa in the 1982 Peach Bowl.

Determined to improve upon what he considered a disappointing junior campaign, White erupted during his senior season in 1983, registering 100 tackles (72 solo), a school single-season record 15 sacks, 9 tackles-for-loss, and an interception. Although Pittsburgh defeated Tennessee 13–3 in the season opener, White consistently kept the Panthers' offense off balance, in spite of being lined up against the Panthers' All-American offensive lineman Bill Fralic. Reggie had two sacks in Tennessee's 31–6 win over New Mexico, and a school single-game record four sacks in the Vols' blowout win over The Citadel. White was named "Southeast Lineman of the Week" for his performance – which included 12 tackles and three sacks – in Tennessee's 20–6 win over LSU, and he twice sacked Alabama quarterback Walter Lewis in Tennessee's 41–34 win over the Tide. In Tennessee's 30–23 win over Maryland in the 1983 Florida Citrus Bowl, White sacked heralded Maryland quarterback Boomer Esiason in the second quarter, knocking him out of the game. White was a consensus All-American, SEC Player of the Year, and a Lombardi Award finalist.

During his tenure at the University of Tennessee, White registered 293 tackles (201 solo), 32 sacks, 19 tackles-for-loss, four fumble recoveries, and seven batted-down passes. His 15 sacks in a season (in 1983) remain a school record. His mark of 32 career sacks remained a school record until it was broken by Derek Barnett in 2016. His school single-game record of four sacks (against The Citadel in 1983) stood until 2013, when Corey Miller had four and a half sacks against Kentucky.

== Professional career ==
=== Memphis Showboats ===
After his college football career, White was chosen by the Memphis Showboats in the 1984 USFL Territorial Draft, and the opportunity to play pro football in the same state where he went to college was enough enticement for him to sign. He played for Memphis for 2 seasons, starting in 36 games. As a member of the Showboats, he racked up 23.5 sacks, one safety and one forced fumble recovered for a touchdown.

=== Philadelphia Eagles ===
When the USFL collapsed in 1985, White took a salary cut in Philadelphia. The Eagles signed him to a 4-year/$6 million contract (with a $400,000 signing bonus) after buying out the remaining three years on his Memphis contract. White was still considered an unproven entity, but his anonymity did not last long. He joined the Eagles after the 1985 season had begun, missing the first few games. When he finally did start, he made ten tackles and two-and-a-half sacks in his first game. By season's end he had turned in 13 sacks in as many games, and he was named NFC Defensive Rookie of the Year.

He played for the Eagles for eight seasons, totaling 121 games, and recorded 124 sacks, becoming the Eagles' all-time sack leader. He also set the Eagles' regular-season record with 21 sacks in a single season (1987, a season shortened to 12 games). The lowest number of sacks he ever recorded in Philadelphia was 11 in 1989. White also became the only player ever to accumulate 20 or more sacks in just 12 games. He set an NFL regular-season record during 1987 by averaging the most sacks per game, with 1.75. Over the course of his tenure with the Eagles, White actually accumulated more sacks than the number of games he played. In 2008, he was voted by ESPN Sportsnation as the greatest player in Eagles' franchise history. In 1991, he set the record for most passes defended in a single season by a defensive lineman with 13, a record that has been since broken by J. J. Watt. In 1992, he received the Bart Starr Award.

=== Green Bay Packers ===
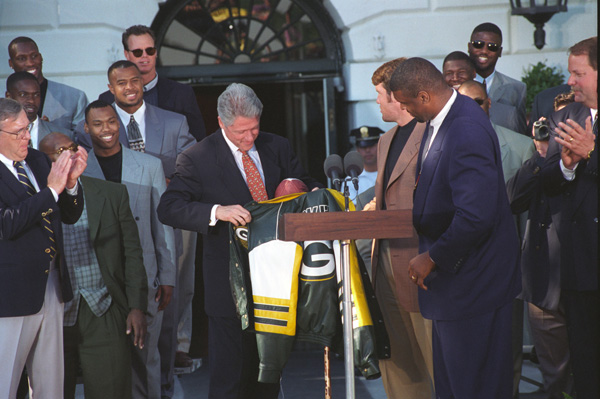
White with teammate Brett Favre (behind) presenting President Bill Clinton with a Packers team jacket at a 1997 ceremony following the Packers' win in Super Bowl XXXI

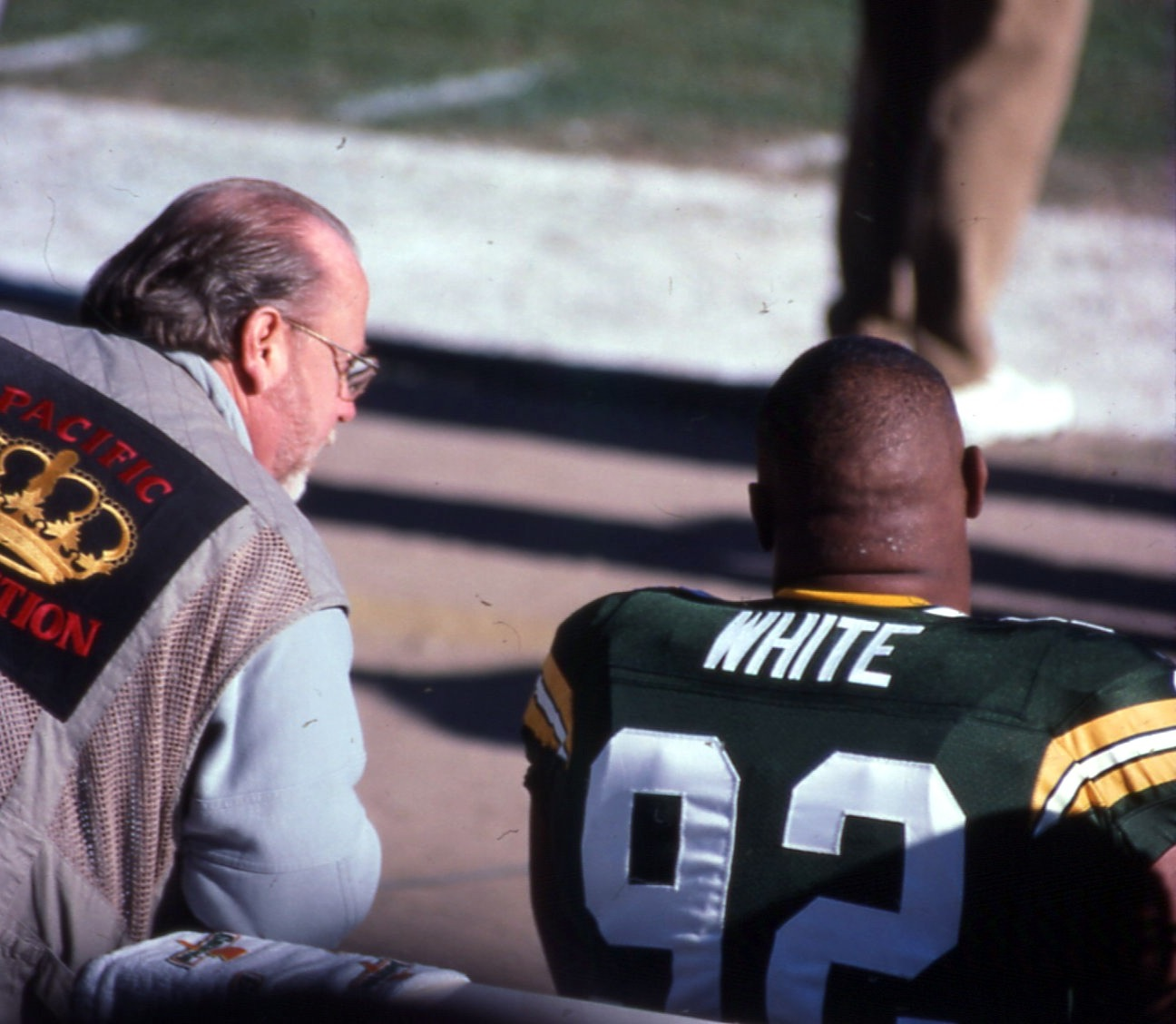
White at Lambeau Field in 1998

In 1993, White became a free agent. His transaction started a new era in the NFL of player-requested free agency. He was signed by the Green Bay Packers and agreed to a 4-year/$17 million contract. At the time, he was the 3rd highest paid player in the NFL, trailing only John Elway and Dan Marino. Playing for the Packers for six seasons, White picked up another 68.5 sacks to become, at the time, the Packers' all-time leader in that category (third now to Clay Matthews III and Kabeer Gbaja-Biamila). White was also just as valued for his role as a team leader. He helped the Packers win Super Bowl XXXI. During the game, White had three sacks to set the single game record for a Super Bowl, including a game-winning sack. That victory was his only championship at any level. In 1998, White was named the NFL Defensive Player of the Year for the second time in his career.

=== Carolina Panthers ===
In 2000, White came out of a one-year retirement and started all 16 games for the Carolina Panthers. This was his least performing season, as he had five and a half sacks and one forced fumble while with the team. He again retired at the end of the 2000 season.

== NFL career statistics ==
Legend
	NFL Defensive Player of the Year
	Won the Super Bowl
	Led the league
**Bold**	Career high

Year	Team	Games		Tackles				Fumbles			Interceptions			
Year	Team	GP	GS	Cmb	Solo	Ast	Sck	FF	FR	TD	Int	Yds	TD	PD
1985	PHI	13	12	100	—	—	13.0	0	2	0	0	0	0	0
1986	PHI	16	16	98	—	—	18.0	0	0	0	0	0	0	0
1987	PHI	12	12	76	—	—	**21.0**	0	1	**1**	0	0	0	0
1988	PHI	16	16	**133**	—	—	18.0	0	2	0	0	0	0	0
1989	PHI	16	16	123	—	—	11.0	0	1	0	0	0	0	0
1990	PHI	16	16	83	—	—	14.0	0	1	0	**1**	33	0	0
1991	PHI	16	16	100	—	—	15.0	0	**3**	0	**1**	0	0	0
1992	PHI	16	16	81	—	—	14.0	0	1	**1**	0	0	0	0
1993	GB	16	16	76	**57**	**19**	13.0	2	2	0	0	0	0	2
1994	GB	16	15	50	36	14	8.0	2	1	0	0	0	0	5
1995	GB	15	13	41	31	10	12.0	2	0	0	0	0	0	4
1996	GB	16	16	38	29	9	8.5	3	**3**	0	**1**	**46**	0	6
1997	GB	16	16	45	31	14	11.0	0	2	0	0	0	0	**7**
1998	GB	16	16	46	33	13	16.0	**4**	0	0	0	0	0	4
2000	CAR	16	16	16	15	1	5.5	1	1	0	0	0	0	1
Career		232	228	1,111	232	80	198.0	14	20	2	3	79	0	29

== Retirement ==
At the time of his retirement, White was the NFL's all-time sack leader with 198. (He has since been surpassed by Bruce Smith, who accumulated 200 in 47 more games played.) Counting his time in the USFL, White has a total of 221.5 sacks, making him professional football's all-time sack leader. White also recorded three interceptions, which he returned for 79 yards. He recovered 20 fumbles, which he returned for 137 yards and two touchdowns. His nine consecutive seasons (1985–1993) with at least 10 sacks remain an NFL record. He was named an All-Pro for 13 of his 15 seasons, including eight as a first-team selection. White is considered by many to be one of the best defensive players in NFL history.

== Professional wrestling ==
White appeared on screen at two professional wrestling events, wrestling one match. In April 1995, he was ringside as part of Lawrence Taylor's "All-Stars" for his match against Bam Bam Bigelow at WrestleMania XI. During the show, he participated in one backstage segment with the All-Stars, calling out The Million Dollar Corporation member King Kong Bundy. Before and during the actual match, the All-Stars and the Million Dollar Corporation were involved in a scuffle, in which White participated.

On May 18, 1997, White wrestled his only professional wrestling match for WCW at Slamboree. He wrestled fellow NFL (and LT's All-Star teammate) alumnus Steve McMichael. The two men emulated football tackles during their bout. White received a warm response from the professional wrestling crowd in Charlotte, North Carolina, but nonetheless lost to McMichael after being hit with a steel Zero Halliburton briefcase secretly given to McMichael by his Four Horsemen teammate, Jeff Jarrett.

== Christian ministry ==
White himself was a strong Christian and was open about his faith. He became involved with the Fellowship of Christian Athletes while at the University of Tennessee, and expressed an interest in becoming an evangelist as early as his sophomore year in 1981. He became an ordained Baptist minister during this period. He had acquired the nickname "Minister of Defense" by the time he was a senior.

In White's last year of football, a friend reportedly gave White a teaching CD from Messianic teacher Monte Judah. Following his retirement, White began studying the Torah (first five books of the Bible) and Torah-observant Messianic theology. White also studied Hebrew under Nehemia Gordon. In October 2003, White was interviewed by Messianic teacher and televangelist Michael Rood, and he discussed his studies of Torah. The interview was broadcast on February 4 and 6, 2005, on the Sky Angel cable channel. White went on to co-produce Rood's half-hour "A Rood Awakening From Israel" TV programs. Following White's death, the January 2005 edition of Messianic magazine Yavoh was dedicated to him as a "Messianic believer", leading to confusion regarding White's religious beliefs. Some reported – incorrectly – that White had abandoned Christianity and was studying Judaism.

White was touched by the black church arson scares during the mid-1990s. The Inner City Church in Knoxville, Tennessee, where White was an associate minister, was burned to the ground in 1996. More than $912,000 was collected to rebuild it, including $250,000 in small donations from Wisconsin fans, but the structure was never rebuilt and the congregation was dissolved. No explanation or accounting was ever offered and his reputation suffered. ("Where Did The Money Go?" The Green Bay News-Chronicle, December 8, 2000).

Also in 1996 he starred with Pat Morita in Reggie's Prayer, a Christian film. He played protagonist Reggie Knox, a football player who retires after the 1996 season to become a 10th grade history teacher and head coach of a high school football team in Portland, Oregon.

In an interview with ABC's 20/20, White made comments about homosexuals. White became an ally of organizations opposed to homosexuality; he appeared in a newspaper advertising campaign to convince gays and lesbians that they could "cease," or end, their homosexuality. As a result, CBS withdrew a 5-year, $6-million contract for being a part of The NFL Today because of his statements calling homosexuality a sin. Both the Green Bay Packers and the NFL objected to the ads, since White had appeared in his football uniform without the consent of the team or the league. Later versions of the advertisement removed the uniform.

On March 25, 1998, White was invited to address the Wisconsin Legislature and, in an infamous speech, stunned the assembly by reiterating his belief that homosexuality was sinful and a "decision," while also using racial tropes to stress why God made different races. He said that blacks are gifted at worship and celebration, Japanese and other Asians "can turn a TV into a watch," Hispanics are gifted at the "family structure" and "can put 20, 30 people into one home," Indians are gifted in spirituality, and "you guys (meaning the predominately white legislature) do a good job of building businesses and things of that nature, and you know how to tap into money." On April 2 he faxed the Milwaukee Journal Sentinel asking for forgiveness, but in 2000, shortly after signing with the Carolina Panthers, he reversed course by saying "I wouldn’t change anything" about the speech.

== Death and legacy ==
On the morning of December 26, 2004, White was rushed from his home in Cornelius, North Carolina, to a nearby hospital in Huntersville, North Carolina, where he was pronounced dead. It was later identified that the cause of his death was due to arrhythmia. According to the Mecklenburg County Medical Examiner's Office, the most likely cause of the arrhythmia was cardiac and pulmonary sarcoidosis, which White had lived with for years. It was also stated that sleep apnea, with which White had been diagnosed, may have contributed to his death.

White's widow, Sara, in conjunction with the Sleep Wellness Institute, founded the Reggie White Sleep Disorders Research and Education Foundation, dedicated to all people having access to treatment for sleep disorders, regardless of their socio-economic status.

"Crescent Rising" is another program of the Reggie White Foundation, begun in May 2007, that offers free demolition services to homeowners in the metropolitan New Orleans area affected by Hurricane Katrina. The Crescent Rising program was created to expedite demolition through the encouragement of private sector involvement in order to speed the recovery of the community from hurricane damage. The foundation demolished its first home in June 2007.

== Honors ==
=== Jersey number retirements ===
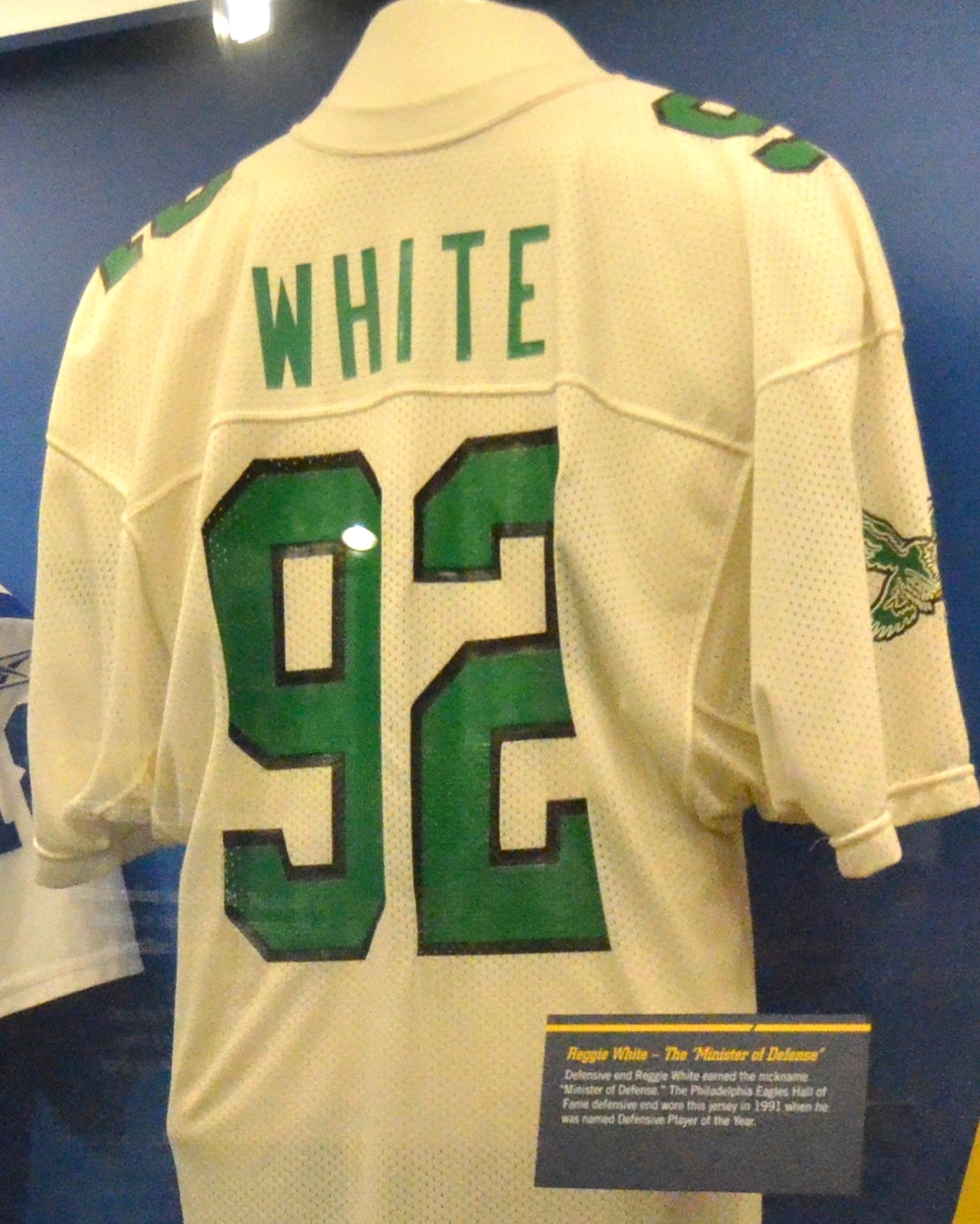
White's Philadelphia Eagles jersey on display at the Pro Football Hall of Fame in Canton, Ohio

During the 2005 season, the Philadelphia Eagles, the Green Bay Packers, and the University of Tennessee retired White's number 92 jersey.

The University of Tennessee retired White's jersey at a halftime presentation on October 1, 2005, during a game against Ole Miss, the 3rd of such retirement in the modern era of football at the school; a commemorative sign was also unveiled in the south end of Neyland Stadium. During a halftime presentation at Lambeau Field on September 18, 2005, White became the 5th Green Bay Packer to have his number retired by the franchise. On December 5, 2005, the Philadelphia Eagles retired his jersey in a halftime ceremony during the Eagles' Monday Night Football game against the Seattle Seahawks, which were coached by Mike Holmgren, White's former coach in Green Bay. White became the first and only player (as of January 2026) in NFL history to have his number officially retired by multiple teams. The Packers and the Eagles also wore a helmet decal honoring White for the remaining games in the season.

=== Hall of Fame election ===
White was posthumously elected to the Pro Football Hall of Fame on his first ballot on February 4, 2006. He was enshrined at a ceremony on August 5, 2006, in Canton, OH. Reggie's wife and now widow, Sara White, delivered her husband's acceptance speech at the ceremony. She was introduced by their son, Jeremy White.

White was elected to the Wisconsin Athletic Hall of Fame in 2005, the Green Bay Packers Hall of Fame in 2006, the Philadelphia Sports Hall of Fame in 2007, and the National High School Football Hall of Fame in 2024.

=== Named streets ===
The official sign-hanging for Reggie White Boulevard took place in 2008, at the intersection of 20th and Carter Street in Chattanooga, Tennessee.

Reggie White Way in Green Bay, Wisconsin, is off Lombardi Avenue near Lambeau Field.

== See also ==
- List of athletes who came out of retirement
- List of gridiron football players who became professional wrestlers
