= NFC Championship Game =

Semifinal championship football game in the NFL

- First played: January 3, 1971 (1970 season)
- Trophy: George Halas Trophy

2025 season
- Lumen Field; Seattle, Washington; January 25, 2026; Seattle Seahawks 31; Los Angeles Rams 27

The NFC Championship Game is the annual championship game of the National Football Conference (NFC) and one of the two semifinal playoff games of the National Football League (NFL), the largest professional American football league in the world. The game is played on the last Sunday in January by the two remaining playoff teams, following the NFC postseason's first two rounds. The NFC champion then advances to face the winner of the AFC Championship Game in the Super Bowl.

The game was established as part of the 1970 merger between the NFL and the American Football League (AFL), with the merged league realigning into two conferences. Since 1984, each winner of the NFC Championship Game has also received the George Halas Trophy, named after the co-founder of the NFL and founder and longtime owner of the Chicago Bears, George Halas.

== History ==
The first NFC Championship Game was played following the 1970 regular season after the merger between the NFL and the AFL. The game is considered the successor to the original NFL Championship, and its game results are listed with that of its predecessor in the annual NFL Record and Fact Book. Since the pre-merger NFL consisted of six more teams than the AFL (16 teams for the NFL and 10 for the AFL), a realignment was done as part of the merger to create two conferences with an equal number of teams: The NFL's Baltimore Colts, Cleveland Browns, and Pittsburgh Steelers joined the ten former AFL teams to form the AFC; while the remaining 13 pre-merger NFL clubs formed the NFC.

Every NFC team has played in an NFC Championship at least once. The Seattle Seahawks, who have been members in both the AFC and the NFC, hold the distinction of appearing in both conference title games. Only the Detroit Lions have yet to win or host an NFC Championship Game. The San Francisco 49ers have the most losses in the NFC Championship Game at 11, along with most appearances at 19, and have hosted the most at 11. Both the Dallas Cowboys and 49ers have won the most NFC Championships at 8 each.

The Los Angeles Rams are the only NFC team to appear in at least one NFC Championship game in every decade since 1970.

== Playoff structure ==
NFC Championship Game logo, 2008–2010 (Used with old shield since 2005)

The structure of the NFL playoffs has changed several times since 1970. At the end of each regular season, the top teams in the NFC qualify for the postseason, including all division champions (three division winners from the 1970–71 to 2001–02 seasons; four since the 2002–03 season) and a set number of "wild card" teams that possess the best win–loss records after the regular season yet fail to win their division (one wild card team from the 1970–71 to 1977–78 seasons; two wild cards from 1978–79 to 1989–90, and from 2002–03 to 2019–20; three from 1990–91 to 2001–02, and since 2020–21). The two teams remaining following the Wild Card round (first round) and the Divisional round (second round) play in the NFC Championship Game, with the winner advancing to the Super Bowl.

Initially, the site of the NFC Championship Game was determined on a rotating basis. Since the 1975–76 season, the site of the game has been based on playoff seeding based on the regular season won-loss record, with the highest surviving seed hosting the game. A wild card team can only host the game if both participants are wild cards; such an instance has yet to occur in the NFL.

== George Halas Trophy ==
External images
- The George Halas Trophy is held by a member of the media during the NFC Championship game between the Philadelphia Eagles and the Minnesota Vikings. Getty Images. January 21, 2018.
- The (former version of the) George Halas Trophy sits on a table at the Hyatt Union Station Hotel in St. Louis. UPI.com. January 25, 2002.

Beginning with the 1984–85 NFL playoffs, the winner of the NFC Championship Game has received the George Halas Trophy, named after the longtime owner and coach of the Chicago Bears, a charter member of the NFL. The original design consisted of a wooden base with a sculpted NFC logo in the front and a relief sculpture of various football players in the back. The Lamar Hunt Trophy, awarded to the AFC Champion, used a similar design with a sculpted AFC logo.

For the 2010–11 NFL playoffs, the two conference trophies were redesigned by Tiffany & Co. at the request of the NFL in an attempt to make both awards more significant. The trophies are now a new, silver design with the outline of a hollow football positioned on a small base to more closely resemble the Vince Lombardi Trophy, awarded to the winner of the Super Bowl.

In recent years conference championship rings are also awarded to members of the team who wins the AFC or NFC championship since they are the winners of the conference, even though they may not necessarily follow it up with a win in the Super Bowl.

The George Halas Trophy should not be confused with the Newspaper Enterprise Association's George Halas Trophy, which was awarded to the NFL's defensive player of the year from 1966 to 1996 or the Pro Football Writers Association's George S. Halas Courage Award.

Prior to the merger in 1970, the NFL champions were awarded the Ed Thorp Memorial Trophy, starting in 1934.

== List of NFC Championship Games ==
Numbers in parentheses in the winning team and losing team columns are NFC Championships won and lost by that team. Bold indicates team won Super Bowl that year. Numbers in parentheses in the city and stadium column is the number of times that metropolitan area and stadium has hosted a NFC Championship, respectively.

Season	Playoffs	Date	Winning team	Score	Losing team	Score	Location	Stadium
1970	1970–71	January 3, 1971	Dallas Cowboys (1)	17	San Francisco 49ers (1)	10	San Francisco, California (Note: San Francisco and Santa Clara are located in the San Francisco Bay Area.)	Kezar Stadium (Note: This was the final NFL game played at Kezar Stadium.)
1971	1971–72	January 2, 1972	**Dallas Cowboys** (2)	14	San Francisco 49ers (2)	3	Irving, Texas	Texas Stadium
1972	1972–73	December 31, 1972	Washington Redskins (1)	26	Dallas Cowboys (1)	3	Washington, D.C.	RFK Stadium (Note: The 1972 Dallas Cowboys were the first ever NFC wild card franchise to advance to the Conference championship game.)
1973	1973–74	December 30, 1973	Minnesota Vikings (1)	27	Dallas Cowboys (2)	10	Irving, Texas (2)	Texas Stadium (2)
1974	1974–75	December 29, 1974	Minnesota Vikings (2)	14	Los Angeles Rams (1)	10	Bloomington, Minnesota (Note: Bloomington and Minneapolis are located in the Minneapolis–Saint Paul area.)	Metropolitan Stadium
1975	1975–76	January 4, 1976	Dallas Cowboys (3)	37	Los Angeles Rams (2)	7	Los Angeles, California (Note: Los Angeles and Inglewood are located in the Greater Los Angeles Area.)	Los Angeles Memorial Coliseum (Note: The 1975 Dallas Cowboys were the first ever wild card franchise to advance to the Super Bowl.)
1976	1976–77	December 26, 1976	Minnesota Vikings (3)	24	Los Angeles Rams (3)	13	Bloomington, Minnesota (2)	Metropolitan Stadium (2)
1977	1977–78	January 1, 1978	**Dallas Cowboys** (4)	23	Minnesota Vikings (1)	6	Irving, Texas (3)	Texas Stadium (3)
1978	1978–79	January 7, 1979	Dallas Cowboys (5)	28	Los Angeles Rams (4)	0	Los Angeles, California (2)	Los Angeles Memorial Coliseum (2)
1979	1979–80	January 6, 1980	Los Angeles Rams (1)	9	Tampa Bay Buccaneers (1)	0	Tampa, Florida	Tampa Stadium
1980	1980–81	January 11, 1981	Philadelphia Eagles (1)	20	Dallas Cowboys (3)	7	Philadelphia, Pennsylvania	Veterans Stadium
1981	1981–82	January 10, 1982	**San Francisco 49ers** (1)	28	Dallas Cowboys (4)	27	San Francisco, California (2)	Candlestick Park (Note: Candlestick Park was also known as 3Com Park.)
1982	1982–83 (Note: Played on Saturday)	January 22, 1983	**Washington Redskins** (2)	31	Dallas Cowboys (5)	17	Washington, D.C. (2)	RFK Stadium (2)
1983	1983–84	January 8, 1984	Washington Redskins (3)	24	San Francisco 49ers (3)	21	Washington, D.C. (3)	RFK Stadium (3)
1984	1984–85	January 6, 1985	**San Francisco 49ers** (2)	23	Chicago Bears (1)	0	San Francisco, California (3)	Candlestick Park (2)
1985	1985–86	January 12, 1986	**Chicago Bears** (1)	24	Los Angeles Rams (5)	0	Chicago, Illinois	Soldier Field
1986	1986–87	January 11, 1987	**New York Giants** (1)	17	Washington Redskins (1)	0	East Rutherford, New Jersey	Giants Stadium
1987	1987–88	January 17, 1988	**Washington Redskins** (4)	17	Minnesota Vikings (2)	10	Washington, D.C. (4)	RFK Stadium (4)
1988	1988–89	January 8, 1989	**San Francisco 49ers** (3)	28	Chicago Bears (2)	3	Chicago, Illinois (2)	Soldier Field (2)
1989	1989–90	January 14, 1990	**San Francisco 49ers** (4)	30	Los Angeles Rams (6)	3	San Francisco, California (4)	Candlestick Park (3)
1990	1990–91	January 20, 1991	**New York Giants** (2)	15	San Francisco 49ers (4)	13	San Francisco, California (5)	Candlestick Park (4)
1991	1991–92	January 12, 1992	**Washington Redskins** (5)	41	Detroit Lions (1)	10	Washington, D.C. (5)	RFK Stadium (5)
1992	1992–93	January 17, 1993	**Dallas Cowboys** (6)	30	San Francisco 49ers (5)	20	San Francisco, California (6)	Candlestick Park (5)
1993	1993–94	January 23, 1994	**Dallas Cowboys** (7)	38	San Francisco 49ers (6)	21	Irving, Texas (4)	Texas Stadium (4)
1994	1994–95	January 15, 1995	**San Francisco 49ers** (5)	38	Dallas Cowboys (6)	28	San Francisco, California (7)	Candlestick Park (6)
1995	1995–96	January 14, 1996	**Dallas Cowboys** (8)	38	Green Bay Packers (1)	27	Irving, Texas (5)	Texas Stadium (5)
1996	1996–97	January 12, 1997	**Green Bay Packers** (1)	30	Carolina Panthers (1)	13	Green Bay, Wisconsin	Lambeau Field
1997	1997–98	January 11, 1998	Green Bay Packers (2)	23	San Francisco 49ers (7)	10	San Francisco, California (8)	3Com Park (7)
1998	1998–99	January 17, 1999	Atlanta Falcons (1)	30 (Note: Overtime)	Minnesota Vikings (3)	27	Minneapolis, Minnesota (3)	Hubert H. Humphrey Metrodome
1999	1999–00	January 23, 2000	**St. Louis Rams** (2)	11	Tampa Bay Buccaneers (2)	6	St. Louis, Missouri	Trans World Dome (Note: The Dome at America's Center was originally known as the Trans World Dome, then the Edward Jones Dome.)
2000	2000–01	January 14, 2001	New York Giants (3)	41	Minnesota Vikings (4)	0	East Rutherford, New Jersey (2)	Giants Stadium (2)
2001	2001–02	January 27, 2002	St. Louis Rams (3)	29	Philadelphia Eagles (1)	24	St. Louis, Missouri (2)	Edward Jones Dome (2)
2002	2002–03	January 19, 2003	**Tampa Bay Buccaneers** (1)	27	Philadelphia Eagles (2)	10	Philadelphia, Pennsylvania (2)	Veterans Stadium (2) (Note: This was the final NFL game played at Veterans Stadium.)
2003	2003–04	January 18, 2004	Carolina Panthers (1)	14	Philadelphia Eagles (3)	3	Philadelphia, Pennsylvania (3)	Lincoln Financial Field
2004	2004–05	January 23, 2005	Philadelphia Eagles (2)	27	Atlanta Falcons (1)	10	Philadelphia, Pennsylvania (4)	Lincoln Financial Field (2)
2005	2005–06	January 22, 2006	Seattle Seahawks (1)	34	Carolina Panthers (2)	14	Seattle, Washington	Qwest Field (Note: Lumen Field was also known as Seahawks Stadium, then Qwest Field, then CenturyLink Field.)
2006	2006–07	January 21, 2007	Chicago Bears (2)	39	New Orleans Saints (1)	14	Chicago, Illinois (3)	Soldier Field (3)
2007	2007–08	January 20, 2008	**New York Giants** (4)	23	Green Bay Packers (2)	20	Green Bay, Wisconsin (2)	Lambeau Field (2)
2008	2008–09	January 18, 2009	Arizona Cardinals (1)	32	Philadelphia Eagles (4)	25	Glendale, Arizona	University of Phoenix Stadium
2009	2009–10	January 24, 2010	**New Orleans Saints** (1)	31	Minnesota Vikings (5)	28	New Orleans, Louisiana	Louisiana Superdome (Note: Caesars Superdome was originally named the Louisiana Superdome, then Mercedes-Benz Superdome.)
2010	2010–11	January 23, 2011	**Green Bay Packers** (3)	21	Chicago Bears (3)	14	Chicago, Illinois (4)	Soldier Field (4)
2011	2011–12	January 22, 2012	**New York Giants** (5)	20	San Francisco 49ers (8)	17	San Francisco, California (9)	Candlestick Park (8)
2012	2012–13	January 20, 2013	San Francisco 49ers (6)	28	Atlanta Falcons (2)	24	Atlanta, Georgia	Georgia Dome
2013	2013–14	January 19, 2014	**Seattle Seahawks** (2)	23	San Francisco 49ers (9)	17	Seattle, Washington (2)	CenturyLink Field (2)
2014	2014–15	January 18, 2015	Seattle Seahawks (3)	28	Green Bay Packers (3)	22	Seattle, Washington (3)	CenturyLink Field (3)
2015	2015–16	January 24, 2016	Carolina Panthers (2)	49	Arizona Cardinals (1)	15	Charlotte, North Carolina	Bank of America Stadium
2016	2016–17	January 22, 2017	Atlanta Falcons (2)	44	Green Bay Packers (4)	21	Atlanta, Georgia (2)	Georgia Dome (2) (Note: This was the final NFL game played at the Georgia Dome.)
2017	2017–18	January 21, 2018	**Philadelphia Eagles** (3)	38	Minnesota Vikings (6)	7	Philadelphia, Pennsylvania (5)	Lincoln Financial Field (3)
2018	2018–19	January 20, 2019	Los Angeles Rams (4)	26	New Orleans Saints (2)	23	New Orleans, Louisiana (2)	Mercedes-Benz Superdome (2)
2019	2019–20	January 19, 2020	San Francisco 49ers (7)	37	Green Bay Packers (5)	20	Santa Clara, California (10)	Levi's Stadium
2020	2020–21	January 24, 2021	**Tampa Bay Buccaneers** (2)	31	Green Bay Packers (6)	26	Green Bay, Wisconsin (3)	Lambeau Field (3)
2021	2021–22	January 30, 2022	**Los Angeles Rams** (5)	20	San Francisco 49ers (10)	17	Inglewood, California (3)	SoFi Stadium (Note: This was the first Championship Game in either conference to be played at the same stadium of that season's Super Bowl.)
2022	2022–23	January 29, 2023	Philadelphia Eagles (4)	31	San Francisco 49ers (11)	7	Philadelphia, Pennsylvania (6)	Lincoln Financial Field (4)
2023	2023–24	January 28, 2024	San Francisco 49ers (8)	34	Detroit Lions (2)	31	Santa Clara, California (11)	Levi's Stadium (2)
2024	2024–25	January 26, 2025	**Philadelphia Eagles** (5)	55	Washington Commanders (2)	23	Philadelphia, Pennsylvania (7)	Lincoln Financial Field (5)
2025	2025–26	January 25, 2026	**Seattle Seahawks** (4)	31	Los Angeles Rams (7)	27	Seattle, Washington (4)	Lumen Field (4)

== Appearances, 1970–present ==
In the sortable table below, teams are ordered first by number of appearances, then by number of wins, and finally by year of first appearance.

#	Team	W	L	%	PF	PA	Last game	Last win	Home				Away			
#	Team	W	L	%	PF	PA	Last game	Last win	G	W	L	%	G	W	L	%
19	San Francisco 49ers	8	11	.421	402	391	2023	2023	11	6	5	.545	8	2	6	.250
14	Dallas Cowboys	8	6	.571	317	264	1995	1995	5	4	1	.800	9	4	5	.444
12	Los Angeles Rams (Note: Includes appearances during the Rams' first tenure in Los Angeles (the 1970 merger to 1994), where they went 1–6 in NFC Championship Games; and their period as the St. Louis Rams (1995–2015), where they went 2–0 in NFC Championship Games.)	5	7	.417	155	258	2025	2021	5	3	2	.600	7	2	5	.286
9	Philadelphia Eagles	5	4	.556	233	156	2024	2024	7	5	2	.714	2	0	2	.000
9	Minnesota Vikings	3	6	.333	143	213	2017	1976	3	2	1	.667	6	1	5	.167
9	Green Bay Packers	3	6	.333	210	238	2020	2010	3	1	2	.333	6	2	4	.333
7	Washington Commanders (Note: The Commanders were known as the Redskins during their first six NFC Championship appearances.)	5	2	.714	162	133	2024	1991	5	5	0	1.000	2	0	2	.000
5	New York Giants	5	0	1.000	116	50	2011	2011	2	2	0	1.000	3	3	0	1.000
5	Chicago Bears	2	3	.400	80	86	2010	2006	4	2	2	.500	1	0	1	.000
4	Seattle Seahawks (Note: The Seahawks were members of the NFC in 1976 and then members of the AFC from 1977 to 2001, before rejoining the NFC in 2002. Including their only appearance (1983) in the AFC Championship Game (0–1), they hold a combined 4–1 record between both Conference Championship Games.)	4	0	1.000	116	80	2025	2025	4	4	0	1.000	0	0	0	—N/a
4	Atlanta Falcons	2	2	.500	108	103	2016	2016	2	1	1	.500	2	1	1	.500
4	Carolina Panthers	2	2	.500	90	82	2015	2015	1	1	0	1.000	3	1	2	.333
4	Tampa Bay Buccaneers	2	2	.500	64	56	2020	2020	1	0	1	.000	3	2	1	.667
3	New Orleans Saints	1	2	.333	68	93	2018	2009	2	1	1	.500	1	0	1	.000
2	Arizona Cardinals	1	1	.500	47	74	2015	2008	1	1	0	1.000	1	0	1	.000
2	Detroit Lions	0	2	.000	41	75	2023	—N/a	0	0	0	—N/a	2	0	2	.000

== Appearances by year ==
In the sortable table below, teams are ordered first by number of appearances, then by number of wins, and finally by year of first appearance. In the "Season(s)" column, bold years indicate winning Conference Championship appearances.

Apps	Team	Wins	Losses	Win %	Season(s)
19	San Francisco 49ers	8	11	.421	1970, 1971, 1981, 1983, 1984, 1988, 1989, 1990, 1992, 1993, 1994, 1997, 2011, 2012, 2013, 2019, 2021, 2022, 2023
14	Dallas Cowboys	8	6	.571	1970, 1971, 1972, 1973, 1975, 1977, 1978, 1980, 1981, 1982, 1992, 1993, 1994, 1995
12	Los Angeles Rams	5	7	.417	1974, 1975, 1976, 1978, 1979, 1985, 1989, 1999, 2001, 2018, 2021, 2025
9	Philadelphia Eagles	5	4	.556	1980, 2001, 2002, 2003, 2004, 2008, 2017, 2022, 2024
9	Minnesota Vikings	3	6	.333	1973, 1974, 1976, 1977, 1987, 1998, 2000, 2009, 2017
9	Green Bay Packers	3	6	.333	1995, 1996, 1997, 2007, 2010, 2014, 2016, 2019, 2020
7	Washington Commanders	5	2	.714	1972, 1982, 1983, 1986, 1987, 1991, 2024
5	New York Giants	5	0	1.000	1986, 1990, 2000, 2007, 2011
5	Chicago Bears	2	3	.400	1984, 1985, 1988, 2006, 2010
4	Seattle Seahawks	4	0	1.000	2005, 2013, 2014, 2025
4	Tampa Bay Buccaneers	2	2	.500	1979, 1999, 2002, 2020
4	Carolina Panthers	2	2	.500	1996, 2003, 2005, 2015
4	Atlanta Falcons	2	2	.500	1998, 2004, 2012, 2016
3	New Orleans Saints	1	2	.333	2006, 2009, 2018
2	Arizona Cardinals	1	1	.500	2008, 2015
2	Detroit Lions	0	2	.000	1991, 2023

== Records by division ==
The table below shows NFC Championship Game records by division, based on the division the franchise was in during the season the championship game was played. The NFL realigned divisions prior to the 2002 season, renaming the NFC Central as the NFC North, creating the NFC South, and shifting several teams among the divisions.

Division	Total				1970–2001				2002–present			
Division	Apps	Wins	Losses	Win %	Apps	Wins	Losses	Win %	Apps	Wins	Losses	Win %
NFC East	35	23	12	.657	25	17 (Note: NFC East conference championship game victories. Pre-2002: 1970, 1971, 1972, 1975, 1977, 1978, 1980, 1982, 1983, 1986, 1987, 1990, 1991, 1992, 1993, 1995, 2000. Since 2002: 2004, 2007, 2011, 2017, 2022, 2024)	8 (Note: NFC East conference championship game losses. Pre-2002: 1972, 1973, 1980, 1981, 1982, 1986, 1994, 2001. Since 2002: 2002, 2003, 2008, 2024)	.680	10	6	4	.600
NFC North	27	8	19	.296	16	6 (Note: NFC North conference championship game victories. Pre-2002: 1973, 1974, 1976, 1985, 1996, 1997. Since 2002: 2006, 2010.)	10 (Note: NFC North conference championship game losses. Pre-2002: 1977, 1979, 1984, 1987, 1988, 1991, 1995, 1998, 1999, 2000. Since 2002: 2007, 2009, 2010, 2014, 2016, 2017, 2019, 2020, 2023)	.375	11	2	9	.182
NFC South	11	6	5	.545	—N/a				11	6 (Note: NFC South conference championship game victories: 2002, 2003, 2009, 2015, 2016, 2020)	5 (Note: NFC South conference championship game losses: 2004, 2005, 2006, 2012, 2018)	.545
NFC West	39	19	20	.487	23	9 (Note: NFC West conference championship game victories. Pre-2002: 1979, 1981, 1984, 1988, 1989, 1994, 1998, 1999, 2001. Since 2002: 2005, 2008, 2012, 2013, 2014, 2018, 2019, 2021, 2023, 2025)	14 (Note: NFC West conference championship game losses. Pre-2002: 1970, 1971, 1974, 1975, 1976, 1978, 1983, 1985, 1989, 1990, 1992, 1993, 1996, 1997. Since 2002: 2011, 2013, 2015, 2021, 2022, 2025)	.391	16	10	6	.625

== Most common matchups ==
Count	Matchup	Record	Years played
6	Dallas Cowboys vs. San Francisco 49ers	Cowboys, 4–2	1970, 1971, 1981, 1992, 1993, 1994
2	Dallas Cowboys vs. Washington Redskins / Commanders	Washington, 2–0	1972, 1982
2	Dallas Cowboys vs. Minnesota Vikings	Tie, 1–1	1973, 1977
2	Los Angeles / St. Louis Rams vs. Minnesota Vikings	Vikings, 2–0	1974, 1976
2	Dallas Cowboys vs. Los Angeles / St. Louis Rams	Cowboys, 2–0	1975, 1978
2	Los Angeles / St. Louis Rams vs. Tampa Bay Buccaneers	Rams, 2–0	1979, 1999
2	Chicago Bears vs. San Francisco 49ers	49ers, 2–0	1984, 1988
2	Los Angeles / St. Louis Rams vs. San Francisco 49ers	Tie, 1–1	1989, 2021
2	New York Giants vs. San Francisco 49ers	Giants, 2–0	1990, 2011
2	Green Bay Packers vs. San Francisco 49ers	Tie, 1–1	1997, 2019

== NFC Championship Game records ==
NFC Championship Game logo, 2001–2005

- Most victories: 8 (tie)
  - Dallas Cowboys (1970–1971, 1975, 1977–1978, 1992–1993, 1995)
  - San Francisco 49ers (1981, 1984, 1988, 1989, 1994, 2012, 2019, 2023)
- Most losses: 11** – San Francisco 49ers (1970–1971, 1983, 1990, 1992–1993, 1997, 2011, 2013, 2021–2022)
- Most appearances: 19** – San Francisco 49ers (1970–1971, 1981, 1983–1984, 1988–1990, 1992–1994, 1997, 2011–2013, 2019, 2021–2023)
- Most consecutive appearances: 4 (tie, 2 teams, 3 times)
  - Dallas Cowboys (1970–1973, 1992–1995)
  - Philadelphia Eagles (2001–2004)
- Most consecutive victories: 2 (tie, 6 teams, 8 times)
  - Dallas Cowboys (1970–1971, 1977–1978, 1992–1993)
  - Minnesota Vikings (1973–1974)
  - Washington Redskins (1982–1983)
  - San Francisco 49ers (1988–1989)
  - Green Bay Packers (1996–1997)
  - Seattle Seahawks (2013–2014)
- Most victories without a loss: 5** – New York Giants (1986, 1990, 2000, 2007, 2011)
- Most appearances without a win: 2 – Detroit Lions (1991, 2023)
- Most consecutive losses before first win: 4* – Los Angeles Rams (1974, 1975, 1976, 1978)
- Most consecutive appearances without a win: 6** – Minnesota Vikings (1977, 1987, 1998, 2000, 2009, 2017)
- Most defensive shutouts: 2* – New York Giants (1986, 17–0 vs Redskins and 2000, 41–0 vs Vikings)
- Most times shut out: 2** – Los Angeles Rams (1978, 0–28 vs Cowboys and 1985, 0–24 vs Bears)
- Most consecutive losses: 3* (tie, 3 times)
  - Los Angeles Rams (1974–1976)
  - Dallas Cowboys (1980–1982)
  - Philadelphia Eagles (2001–2003)
- Most games hosted: 11* – San Francisco 49ers (1970, 1981, 1984, 1989–1990, 1992, 1994, 1997, 2011, 2019, 2023)
- Most consecutive games hosted: 3 – Philadelphia Eagles (2002–2004)
- Most common matchup: 6** – Dallas Cowboys vs. San Francisco 49ers (1970–1971, 1981, 1992–1994)
- Most points scored: 55** – January 26, 2025 (2024) – Philadelphia Eagles (55) vs. Washington Commanders (23)
- Largest margin of victory: 41 points – January 14, 2001 (2000) – New York Giants (41) vs. Minnesota Vikings (0)
- Smallest margin of victory: 1 point** – January 10, 1982 (1981) – San Francisco 49ers (28) vs. Dallas Cowboys (27)
- Fewest points scored, winning team: 9** – January 6, 1980 (1979) – Los Angeles Rams (9) vs. Tampa Bay Buccaneers (0)
- Fewest points scored: 0* (tie, 5 teams, 6 times)
  - January 7, 1979 (1978) – Los Angeles Rams (0) vs Dallas Cowboys (28)
  - January 6, 1980 (1979) – Tampa Bay Buccaneers (0) vs Los Angeles Rams (9)
  - January 6, 1985 (1984) – Chicago Bears (0) vs San Francisco 49ers (23)
  - January 12, 1986 (1985) – Los Angeles Rams (0) vs Chicago Bears (24)
  - January 11, 1987 (1986) – Washington Redskins (0) vs New York Giants (17)
  - January 14, 2001 (2000) – Minnesota Vikings (0) vs New York Giants 41
- Most points scored, losing team: 31 – January 28, 2024 (2023) – Detroit Lions (31) vs. San Francisco 49ers (34)
- Most combined points scored: 78** – January 26, 2025 (2024) – Philadelphia Eagles (55) vs. Washington Commanders (23)
- Fewest combined points scored: 9** – January 6, 1980 (1979) – Los Angeles Rams (9) vs. Tampa Bay Buccaneers (0)
- Longest game: 71 minutes, 52 seconds** – January 17, 1999 (1998) – Atlanta Falcons (30) @ Minnesota Vikings (27), OT
- Most NFC Championships won in overtime: 2** – New York Giants (2007, 2011)
- Most NFC Championships lost in overtime: 2* (tie)
  - Green Bay Packers (2007, 2014)
  - Minnesota Vikings (1998, 2009)
- Current teams which have never hosted an NFC Championship Game: Detroit Lions (Note: The Lions last hosted and won the 1957 NFL Championship Game during the pre-Super Bowl era.)
- Current teams which have never won an NFC Championship: Detroit Lions (0–2)
- Longest drought without appearing in an NFC Championship Game: Dallas Cowboys (last appearance – 1995)
- Longest drought without an NFC Championship: Detroit Lions**
- Highest attendance: 88,919 – Dallas Cowboys vs. Los Angeles Rams at the Los Angeles Memorial Coliseum on January 4, 1976 (1975)
- Largest comeback: 17 points (tie)
  - San Francisco 49ers (trailed 17–0; won 28–24), 2012
  - San Francisco 49ers (trailed 24–7; won 34–31), 2023
- Overtime games:
  - 1998: Atlanta Falcons 30, Minnesota Vikings 27
  - 2007: New York Giants 23, Green Bay Packers 20
  - 2009: New Orleans Saints 31, Minnesota Vikings 28
  - 2011: New York Giants 20, San Francisco 49ers 17
  - 2014: Seattle Seahawks 28, Green Bay Packers 22
  - 2018: Los Angeles Rams 26, New Orleans Saints 23

Notes:
* Tied for Conference Championship record
** Conference Championship record

== TV ratings ==
- 2024: 44.2 million

== See also ==
- NFL Championship Game
