= 1997 NFC Championship Game =

1998 American football postseason game

Green Bay Packers (2) (13–3)	San Francisco 49ers (1) (13–3)
23	10
Head coach: Mike Holmgren	Head coach: Steve Mariucci
	1	2	3	4	Total
GB	3	10	0	10	23
SF	0	3	0	7	10
- Date: January 11, 1998
- Stadium: 3Com Park; San Francisco, California, U.S.
- Referee: Dick Hantak
- Attendance: 68,987

TV in the United States
- Network: Fox
- Announcers: Pat Summerall and John Madden

The 1997 National Football Conference (NFC) Championship Game was an American football game played between the Green Bay Packers and San Francisco 49ers on January 11, 1998, at 3Com Park in San Francisco, California, United States. Both the Packers and 49ers finished the season with identical 13–3 records, each winning their respective divisions. The 49ers received the first seed in the playoffs due to tie-breakers: the 49ers had a better conference record than the Packers (11–1 versus 10–2, respectively). Both teams received first round byes during the Wild Card round. The Packers faced off against the Tampa Bay Buccaneers in the Divisional Round, winning 21–7 and advancing to their third straight NFC Championship Game. The 49ers beat the Minnesota Vikings in the Divisional Round by a score of 38–22. With their higher seeding, the 49ers hosted the Packers in the NFC Championship Game.

The Packers took a 13–3 lead into halftime behind two field goals and a Brett Favre touchdown pass to Antonio Freeman. Ryan Longwell kicked another field goal in the fourth quarter before Dorsey Levens scored a touchdown with under four minutes left in the game. Even though the 49ers returned the ensuing kick off for a touchdown, the Packers were able to hold on for a 23–10 victory. The victory was the third straight year that the Packers beat the 49ers in the playoffs. The game continued the growing 49ers–Packers rivalry of the 1990s. The Packers advanced to Super Bowl XXXII, their second straight, where they lost 31–24 to the Denver Broncos. The two teams met again the next season in the playoffs, with the 49ers winning in dramatic fashion in what became known as The Catch II game.

== Background ==
The Green Bay Packers entered the 1997 NFL season as the defending champions after winning Super Bowl XXXI. The San Francisco 49ers had been defeated in the Divisional Round of the playoffs that season by the Packers 35–14, the second straight season the Packers beat the 49ers in the playoffs. The Packers began their season somewhat slowly, going 3–2 during their first five games. However they won their next five games before suffering a showing defeat to the Indianapolis Colts in Week 12, who at the time were 0–10. The Packers rebounded with another five game winning streak to finish the season with a record of 13–3. Brett Favre was named the AP NFL Most Valuable Player Award for the season, sharing the award with Barry Sanders.

The 49ers began the season with a loss against the Tampa Bay Buccaneers, but then went on an 11 game win streak. After losing 44–9 against the Kansas City Chiefs in Week 14, the 49ers won their next two games to secure the first seed in the playoffs. The 49ers lost to the Seattle Seahawks in the last game of the season, although they rested their starters, to finish with a record of 13–3. Because both teams finished with the same record, tie-breakers determined seeding. Since neither team played each other, the relevant tie-breaker was conference record, which the 49ers won after going 11–1 in interconference games (the Packers went 10–2).

Both teams were awarded bye weeks during the first round of the playoffs. The Packers hosted the Tampa Bay Buccaneers in the Divisional Round of the playoffs, while the 49ers hosted the Minnesota Vikings. Both teams won their playoff games, with the Packers winning 21–7 and the 49ers winning 38–22. With their higher seed, the 49ers earned the right to host the Packers in the NFC Championship Game, which would be played at 3Com Park on January 11, 1998. The Packers were 1.5 point favorites.

== Game summary ==
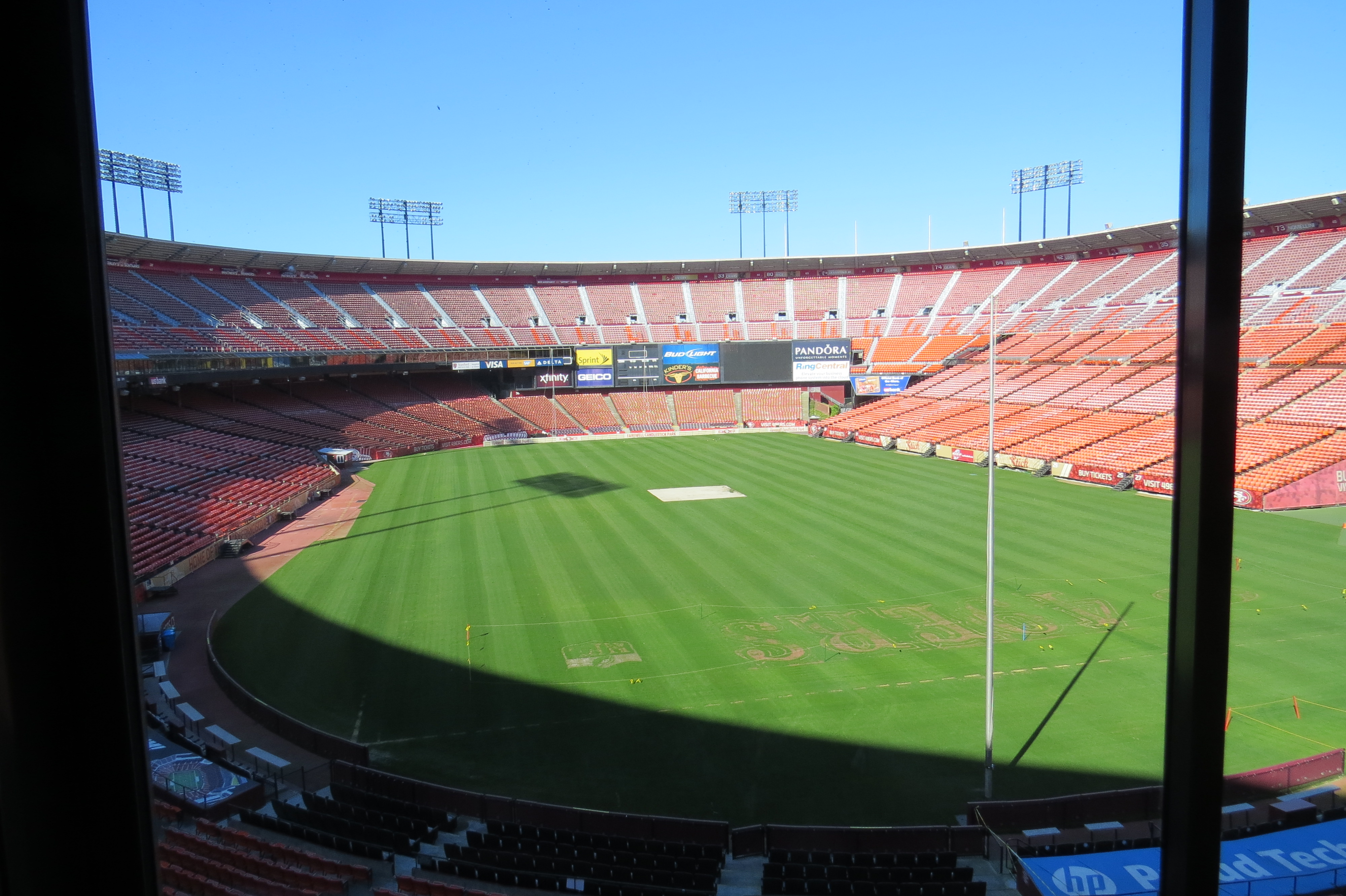
3Com Park, shown here in 2014, was the site of the NFC Championship Game.

=== First half ===
The 49ers began the game with the ball, moving to mid-field before being forced to punt. The Packers ensuing drive last 10 plays, going 76 yards before being stopped just short of the end zone. 49ers cornerback Rod Woodson was flagged for a 27-yard pass interference penalty on the drive. Ryan Longwell kicked a 19-yard field goal to give the Packers a 3–0 lead. Both teams traded three-and-outs before the 49ers took a six play, 60-yard drive into Packers' territory. However, Steve Young was intercepted by Eugene Robinson and returned 58 yards. The Packers scored two plays later on a 27-yard pass from Brett Favre to Antonio Freeman, increasing the Packers lead to 10–0. The 49ers punted on their ensuing drive. The Packers took over and drove 57 yards over 11 plays, although Longwell missed a 47-yard field goal attempt to give the ball back to the 49ers. The 49ers finally scored, with Gary Anderson converting a 28-yard field goal to cut into the Packers lead, 10–3. The drive was extended with a 48-yard catch from Young to J. J. Stokes on third-and-26. With less than a minute left in the half, the Packers drove 48 yards in 3 plays, including a 40-yard heave from Favre to Freeman, to give Longwell a shot at a 43-yard field goal, which he converted. The Packers took a 13–3 into halftime.

=== Second half ===
In the third quarter, neither team scored. The Packers and 49ers exchanged two punts each after drives that went less than 50 yards. The Packers and 49ers exchanged punts again at the beginning of the fourth quarter, before the Packers scored on a nine-play, 28 yard drive. Longwell converted a 25-yard field goal to put the Packers up 16–3. On the ensuing drive, the 49ers went for it on fourth down, although Young was sacked by Keith McKenzie, giving the ball to the Packers on their 11-yard line. Two plays later, Dorsey Levens ran in a five-yard touchdown to increase the Packers lead to 23–3. On the kickoff, Chuck Levy complete a 95-yard return for a touchdown, cutting the Packers lead to 23–10. The Packers went three-and-out on their next drive, punting the ball back to the 49ers. The 49ers moved the ball on their drive, but Young fumbled and the Packers recovered the ball. They ran one play to end the game, winning 23–10.

=== Box score ===
Green Bay Packers vs. San Francisco 49ers – Game summary

Quarter	1	2	3	4	Total
Packers	3	10	0	10	23
49ers	0	3	0	7	10

at 3Com Park, San Francisco, California

- Game time: 6:00 p.m. EST/3:00 p.m. PST
- Game weather: 57 °F (14 °C), rain
- Game attendance: 68,987
- Referee: Dick Hantak
- TV announcers (Fox): Pat Summerall and John Madden
- Sources: Pro-Football-Reference.com and the Green Bay Press-Gazette

Game information

First quarter

- GB – Ryan Longwell 19-yard field goal, 2:48. Packers 3–0. Drive: 10 plays, 76 yards, 5:16.

Second quarter

- GB – Antonio Freeman 27-yard pass from Brett Favre (Ryan Longwell kick), 11:30. Packers 10–0. Drive: 2 plays, 28 yards, 0:44.
- SF – Gary Anderson 28-yard field goal, 0:58. Packers 10–3. Drive: 9 plays, 52 yards, 3:25.
- GB – Ryan Longwell 43-yard field goal, 0:00. Packers 13–3. Drive: 3 plays, 48 yards, 0:58.

Third quarter

- No scoring

Fourth quarter

- GB – Ryan Longwell 25-yard field goal, 5:12. Packers 16–3. Drive: 9 plays, 28 yards, 5:02.
- GB – Dorsey Levens 5-yard rush (Ryan Longwell kick), 3:10. Packers 23–3. Drive: 2 plays, 11 yards, 0:48.
- SF – Chuck Levy 95-yard kickoff return (Gary Anderson kick), 2:52. Packers 23–10. Drive: 1 play, 95 yards, 0:18.

Green Bay Packers stats

Passing

- Brett Favre – 16/27, 222 yards, 1 touchdown

Rushing

- Dorsey Levens – 27 rushes, 114 yards, 1 touchdown
- William Henderson – 3 rushes, 2 yards
- Brett Favre – 2 rushes, -10 yards

Receiving

- Antonio Freeman – 9 receptions, 138 yards, 1 touchdown
- Dorsey Levens – 4 receptions, 27 yards
- Robert Brooks – 3 receptions, 36 yards
- Mark Chmura – 2 receptions, 18 yards
- Tyrone Davis – 1 reception, 17 yards
- Derrick Mayes – 1 reception, 10 yards
- William Henderson – 1 reception, 7 yards
San Francisco 49ers stats

Passing

- Steve Young – 23/38, 250 yards, 1 interception

Rushing

- Garrison Hearst – 8 rushes, 12 yards
- Terry Kirby – 6 rushes, 21 yards
- Steve Young – 2 rushes, 1 yard

Receiving

- Terrell Owens – 6 receptions, 100 yards
- J. J. Stokes – 6 receptions, 87 yards
- Terry Kirby – 4 receptions, 7 yards
- Garrison Hearst – 3 receptions, 14 yards
- Iheanyi Uwaezuoke – 2 receptions, 14 yards
- Greg Clark – 1 reception, 16 yards
- Brent Jones – 1 reception, 12 yards

=== Analysis ===
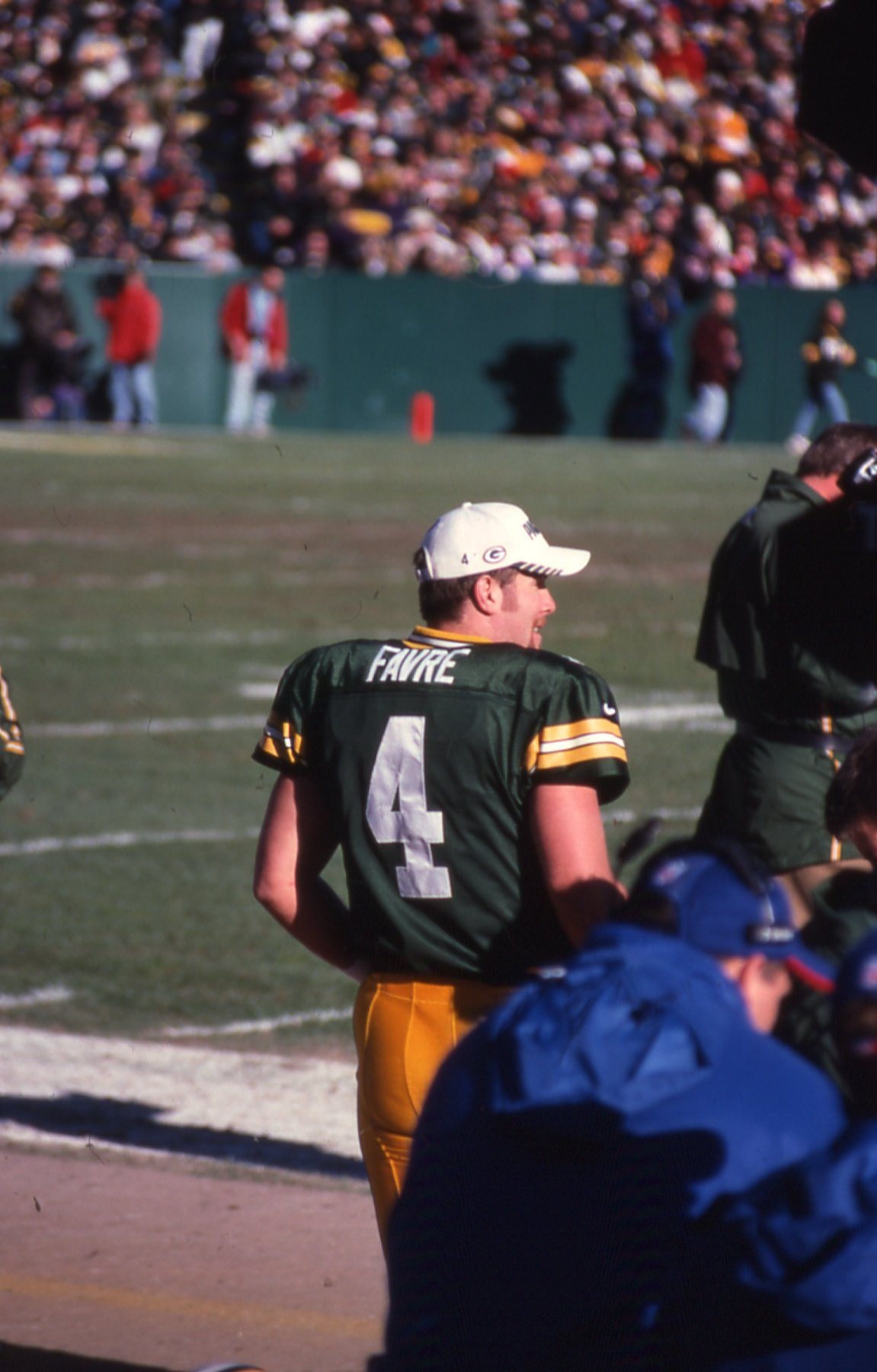
Brett Favre had a productive game, throwing for 222 yards and two touchdowns.

Post-game analysis focused on the Packers defense, especially its pass defense in the second half. Although Young began the game completing his first 10 passes, the Packers shut him down in the second half. They sacked Young four times, forced three fumbles, and held him to just 52 yards passing in the half. Young also threw an interception that swung momentum over to the Packers and led to a short touchdown drive. The 49ers only gained three first downs in the second half, with two of those occurring during the last minute of the game. The Packers defense also did not allow an offensive touchdown during the game, the first time it did that since 1965. The 49ers only touchdown came on a 95-yard kick-off return by Levy, which was the longest return and the first return for a touchdown against the Packers in the playoffs. The Packers did a good job preventing Young from scrambling, while the rainy conditions were better managed by the Packers. The Packers had a productive running game, while the 49ers fell flat. Levens increased his Packers single playoff game rushing record to 114 yards, while the 49ers only managed 33 yards rushing as a team. The Packers also balanced their offense well, with Favre throwing for 222 yards and two touchdowns, with most of the damage going to Freeman and Robert Brooks.

== Outcome ==
The Packers advanced to Super Bowl XXXII against the Denver Broncos; it was the Packers second consecutive trip to the Super Bowl. In a back-and-forth affair, the Broncos beat the Packers 31–24 after giving up 157 rushing yards and 3 touchdowns to running back Terrell Davis. Both the Packers and 49ers returned to the playoffs in the 1998 NFL season, facing each other in the playoffs for the fourth straight season. The 49ers finally beat the Packers, securing a last-minute victory in what became known as The Catch II game.

=== Legacy ===
The game marked the third straight season the Packers beat the 49ers in the playoffs, continuing a a growing rivalry between the teams that has been maintained into the 21st century. It was also a part of a personal rivalry between quarterbacks Brett Favre and Steve Young that ended up including four playoff games in the 1990s. It was the first time in at least 17 years that a team beat the 49ers four straight times. The game also gave the Packers their second consecutive berth into the Super Bowl, continuing their strong level of performance that decade. The 49ers and Packers would not meet in another NFC Championship Game until 2019. In 2020, the Milwaukee Journal Sentinel ranked the game as one of the greatest moments in Wisconsin sports history over the previous 50 years. In 2024, the newspaper also ranked it as one of the best games between the Packers and 49ers in their rivalry.
