= 49ers–Packers rivalry =

American football rivalry

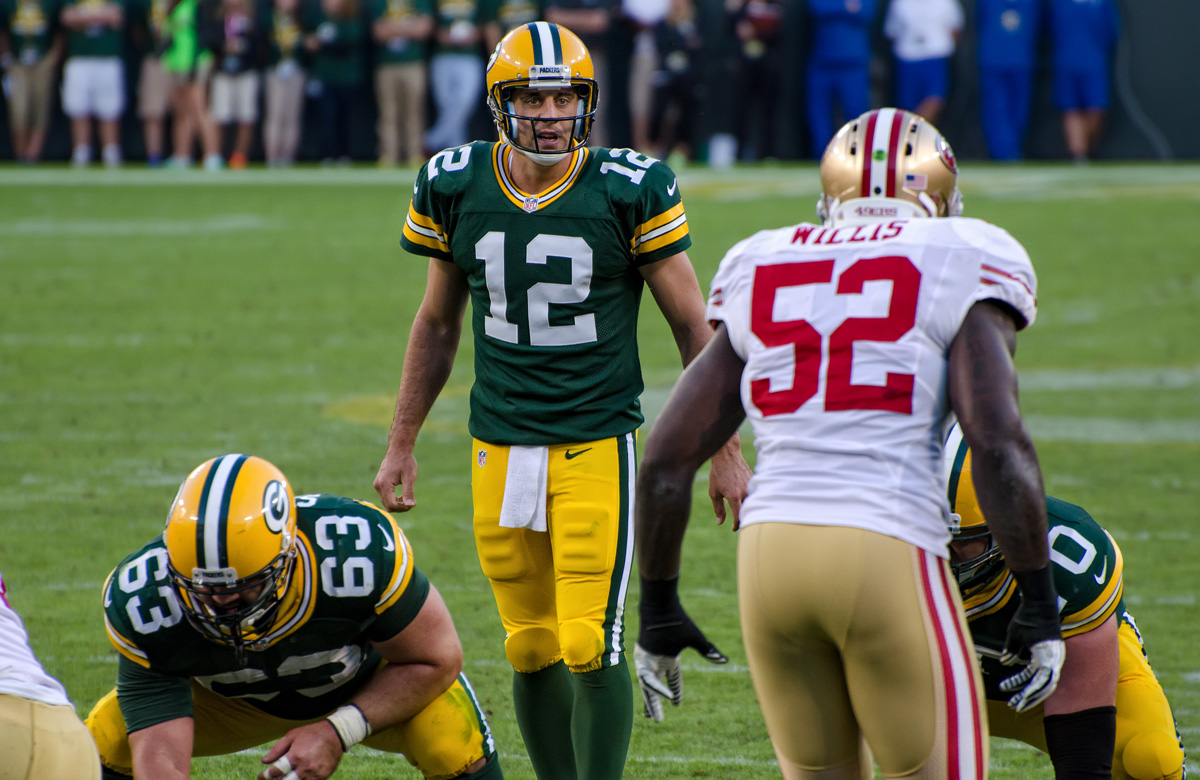
- Aaron Rodgers (#12) of the Packers lining up against Patrick Willis (#52) of the 49ers during a 2012 match-up

- San Francisco 49ers Green Bay Packers
- Location: San Francisco, Green Bay
- First meeting: November 26, 1950; Packers 25, 49ers 21
- Latest meeting: November 24, 2024; Packers 38, 49ers 10
- Next meeting: 2027
- Stadiums: 49ers: Levi's Stadium; Packers: Lambeau Field

Statistics
- Total meetings: 74
- All-time series: Packers: 39–34–1
- Regular season series: Packers: 35–28–1
- Postseason results: 49ers: 6–4
- Largest victory: 49ers: 35–0 (1954); Packers: 38–10 (2024)
- Most points scored: 49ers: 48 (1953), (1958); Packers: 41 (1960)
- Longest win streak: 49ers: 7 (1950–1954); Packers: 8 (1999–2010)
- Current win streak: Packers: 1 (2024–present)

Post-season history
- 1995 NFC Divisional: Packers won: 27–17; 1996 NFC Divisional: Packers won: 35–14; 1997 NFC Championship: Packers won: 23–10; 1998 NFC Wild Card: 49ers won: 30–27; 2001 NFC Wild Card: Packers won: 25–15; 2012 NFC Divisional: 49ers won: 45–31; 2013 NFC Wild Card: 49ers won: 23–20; 2019 NFC Championship: 49ers won: 37–20; 2021 NFC Divisional: 49ers won: 13–10; 2023 NFC Divisional: 49ers won: 24–21

The 49ers–Packers rivalry is an American football rivalry between the San Francisco 49ers and the Green Bay Packers. As the 49ers play in the NFC West, and the Packers play in the NFC North, both teams do not play every year; instead, they play once every three years and at least once every six seasons at each team's home stadium due to the NFL's rotating division schedules during which their divisions are paired up. Additionally, not only both teams could meet in the playoffs, but also if they finish in the same place in their respective divisions, they would play the ensuing season. The rivalry became prominent during the 1990s, as the Brett Favre-led Packers defeated the Steve Young-led 49ers in three of four playoff meetings. In the 2005 NFL draft, the 49ers selected Alex Smith with the first overall selection, passing on northern California native Aaron Rodgers; Green Bay later selected Rodgers with the 24th pick. Since Rodgers became the Packers' starter in 2008, the Packers and 49ers met in the playoffs five times, four with Rodgers, though the 49ers have won all five of these meetings.

The Packers lead the all-time series 39–34–1. The teams have met ten times in the playoffs, with the 49ers leading 6–4.

== Pre-rivalry history ==
=== Green Bay Packers (1919–1949) ===
The Green Bay Packers were founded in 1919 by Curly Lambeau and George Whitney Calhoun. After a few years of playing local teams, the Packers entered the National Football League (NFL) in 1921. Between 1929 and 1944, the Packers dominated the NFL, winning six championships and reaching the playoffs two other times. The advent of the forward pass under coach Curly Lambeau and wide receiver Don Hutson revolutionized the way football was played. After the retirement of Hutson and the eventual departure of Lambeau to the Chicago Cardinals, the Packers experienced poor results from 1945 to 1949.

=== San Francisco 49ers (1946–1949) ===
The San Francisco 49ers were founded in 1946 by businessman Tony Morabito in the All-America Football Conference (AAFC), a newly formed rival to the NFL. The 49ers competed in the Western Division of the AAFC from 1946 to 1948. Each season, they came in second place in the division behind the Cleveland Browns. In 1949, after the AAFC was reduced to seven teams, the league implemented a single division and used the Shaughnessy system to determine who made the playoffs. The 49ers again came in second behind the Browns, but with the new system were able to make the four-team playoffs. They defeated the New York Yankees 17–7 in the semifinal but lost to the Browns in the championship game 21–7. After the season, the NFL and AAFC completed a merger, with the Browns and Indianapolis Colts joining the 49ers as new teams in the NFL (the Los Angeles Dons merged with the Los Angeles Rams while the three other AAFC teams folded).

== Overview of rivalry ==
The 49ers and Packers emerged as rivals during the mid-1990s, meeting in the playoffs four consecutive years. During this period, the 49ers were led by Steve Young and Jerry Rice, while the Packers featured Brett Favre as their offensive leader, and Reggie White as their defensive anchor. The two teams' head coaches came from the Bill Walsh coaching tree, with 49ers head coach George Seifert having served under Walsh as a defensive coordinator, and Packers head coach Mike Holmgren having served as an offensive coordinator and quarterbacks coach. Both were on Walsh's staff when the 49ers won Super Bowl XXIII in 1988, and Holmgren served on Seifert's staff when the 49ers repeated as champions in Super Bowl XXIV in 1989. Before the 1992 season, Holmgren was hired as the Packers' head coach, and the Packers acquired Favre from the Atlanta Falcons.

Their first postseason encounter came in the 1995 Divisional Round. The 49ers entered the game as defending Super Bowl champions. In that game, the Packers jumped out to a 21–0 lead en route to a 27–17 victory at Candlestick Park. While Favre threw for 299 yards and two touchdowns, Young completed 32 of a record 65 pass attempts for 328 yards, with two interceptions and three sacks. The two teams met again in the 1996 Divisional Round, with Green Bay also winning the game 35–14 en route to claiming Super Bowl XXXI. This game was notorious for muddy conditions at Lambeau Field following a torrent of rain and snow. In a defensive battle, it was special teams player and eventual Super Bowl MVP Desmond Howard who stole the show, with a 71-yard punt return touchdown and a 46-yard return to set up another Packers touchdown. After this game, Seifert left the 49ers, and former Packers assistant Steve Mariucci took over as head coach.

Muddy field conditions and torrential rain also played a key role when the 49ers and Packers met for a third straight postseason in the 1997 NFC Championship Game at Candlestick Park. This game, which the Packers won 23–10 en route to a losing effort in Super Bowl XXXII, saw Favre complete a touchdown pass to Antonio Freeman in the second quarter to give the Packers a lead they never relinquished. But perhaps the most defining moment of the rivalry came in the 1998 Wild Card Round. Late in the fourth quarter, with the 49ers trailing 27–23, Young drove 76 yards to set up Terrell Owens' game-winning touchdown catch. This moment became known as The Catch II, in homage to a similar play in the 1981 NFC Championship Game. This was also the only time Young defeated Favre in the playoffs, and was also Favre's only career loss to San Francisco as a Packer.

The final playoff meeting involving Brett Favre came in the 2001 Wild Card Round. With the Packers trailing at home 7–6 entering the second half, Favre completed 16 of 21 passes for 226 yards, and led the Packers to four scoring drives. The last of those drives saw Ahman Green run nine yards for the game-sealing touchdown.

The rivalry between the two teams reignited during the 2005 NFL draft. After the 49ers finished 2–14 in 2004, they received the top overall pick in the draft. This draft featured two top quarterback prospects in Alex Smith and northern California native Aaron Rodgers, who grew up rooting for the 49ers and idolizing Joe Montana. In an infamous draft moment, the 49ers passed on Rodgers and selected Smith with the first pick. Meanwhile, Rodgers had to wait until the Packers selected him with the 24th overall pick. While Smith immediately became the starter for the 49ers, Rodgers backed up Favre for three seasons before becoming the Packers' starting quarterback in 2008. Between 2008 and 2012, Rodgers defeated Smith in two of three regular season encounters, before Smith was eventually traded to the Kansas City Chiefs in 2013.

During the Favre era, the Packers dominated the 49ers, with Favre having an 11–1 record against them (with the only loss being the aforementioned 1998 Wild Card game). During the Rodgers era, however, the 49ers had more success against the Packers, as Rodgers went 6–7 against the 49ers as a member of the Packers, including an 0–4 playoff record.

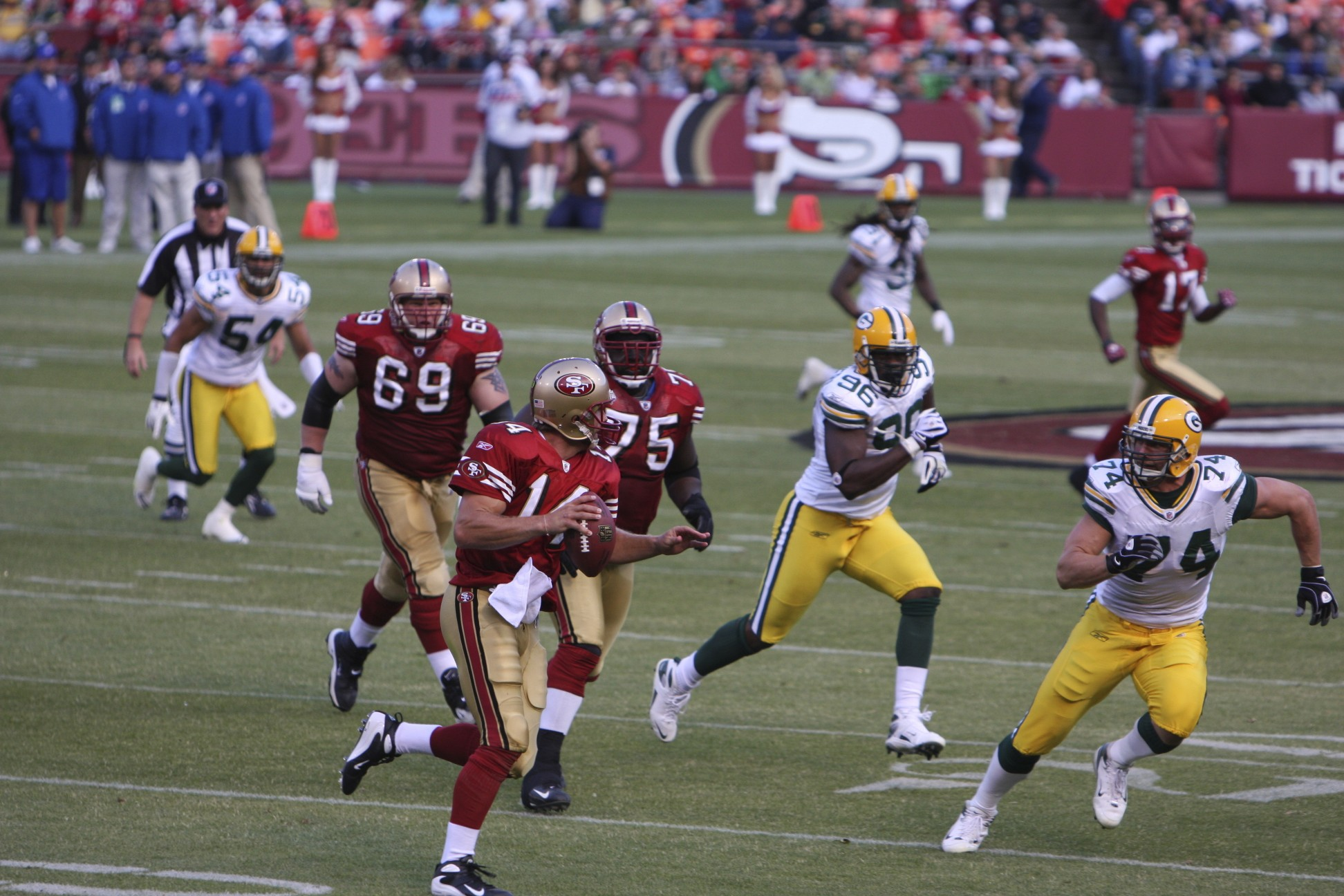
49ers quarterback J. T. O'Sullivan being chased by Packers defensive lineman Aaron Kampman during a 2008 preseason game

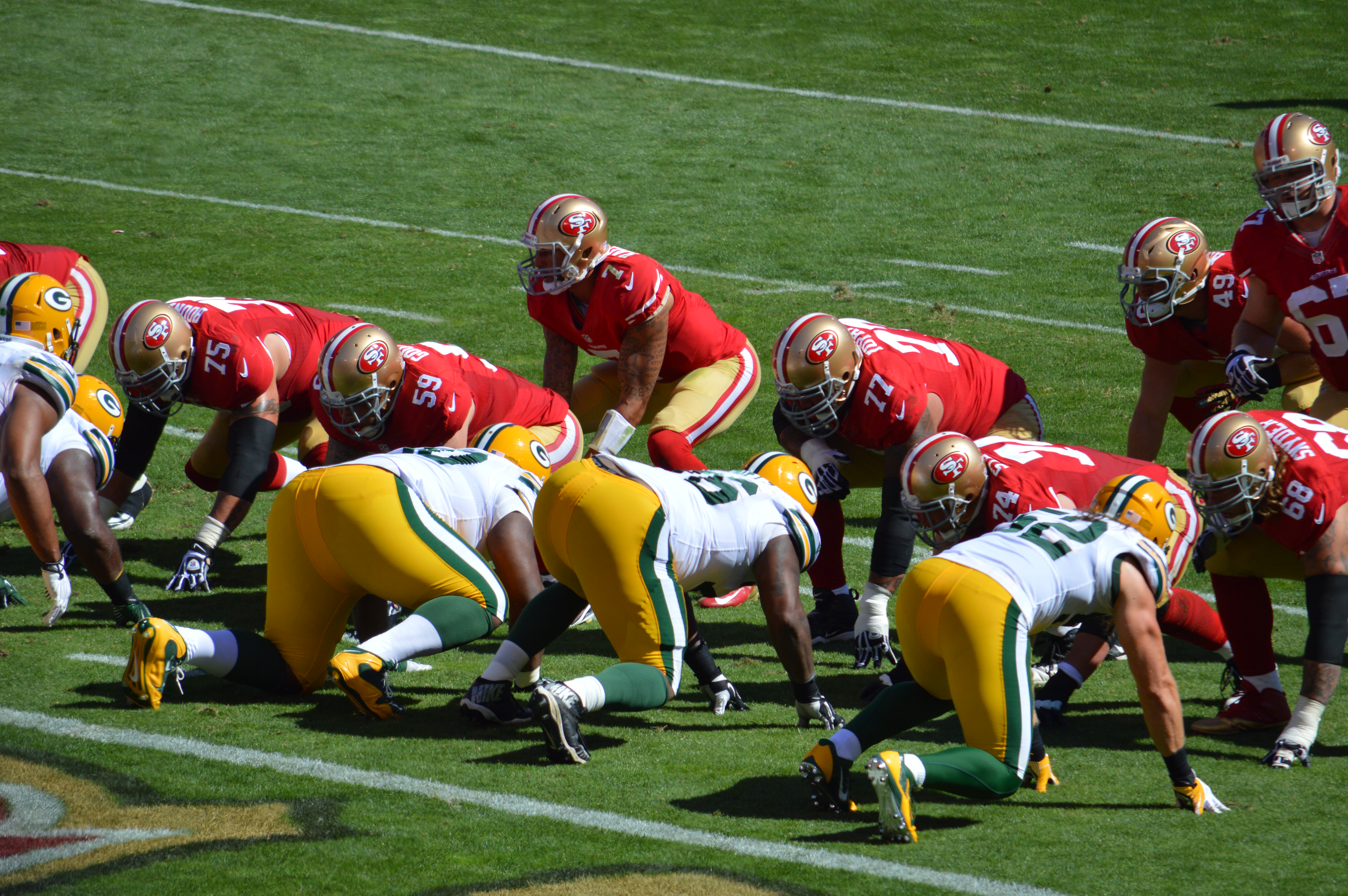
The 49ers offense lining up against the Packers defense in a 2013 game.

The 49ers and Packers renewed their playoff rivalry in the 2012 Divisional Round. This game saw the playoff debut of Colin Kaepernick, and he rewarded the home fans with a quarterback playoff record 181 rushing yards, 263 passing yards and four touchdowns. This marked the final playoff game at Candlestick Park. The following season, a rematch took place in Green Bay during the 2013 Wild Card Round. Despite the chilly conditions at Lambeau Field, the 49ers prevailed in a close-knit affair 23–20, with Phil Dawson scoring the game-winning field goal. Kaepernick ran for 98 yards and threw 227 yards. This was San Francisco's first playoff road victory over Green Bay. The 49ers and Packers also faced off in the 2019 NFC Championship Game, with running back Raheem Mostert scoring four touchdowns on 220 rushing yards. This game also featured two coaches who were fourth-generation descendants to the Bill Walsh coaching tree, as 49ers head coach Kyle Shanahan and Packers head coach Matt LaFleur both served under Kyle's father Mike Shanahan, who in turn succeeded Mike Holmgren as the 49ers' offensive coordinator under George Seifert.

Two years after the 2019 NFC Championship, the two teams met again in the 2021 Divisional Round. While the Packers entered the contest as the NFC's top seed, the sixth-seeded 49ers beat the Packers, 13–10. The game's turning point saw the 49ers' special teams score a game-tying touchdown late in the fourth quarter following a blocked punt on Packers punter Corey Bojorquez, and in the closing seconds, placekicker Robbie Gould kicked the game-winning field goal. This dropped Rodgers' playoff record against the 49ers to 0–4.

The two teams met again two years later in the 2023 Divisional Round for a record 10th playoff meeting between two teams. Each club had two new quarterbacks, Jordan Love for the Packers and Brock Purdy for the 49ers. The Packers had won against the teams' fellow rival Dallas Cowboys in the previous round, becoming the first 7 seed to win a playoff game against the 2 seed. Despite falling behind 21–14, the 49ers came back on their final drive to win 24–21, capped off with an interception by Dre Greenlaw off a pass by Love on Green Bay's final possession to end the close contest. The 49er victory sent them to their third consecutive NFC Championship Game and extended their playoff win streak to 5 against the Packers.

== Game results ==
The 49ers and Packers have played each other 74 times, with the Packers leading the all-time series 39–34–1. The Packers lead the all-time series 23–11 when they are the home team, while the 49ers lead the all-time series 17–12–1 when they are the home team. The 49ers and Packers have played each other ten times in the postseason, with the 49ers leadings the playoff series 6–4. The following game results are up-to-date through the 2024 season.

San Francisco 49ers vs. Green Bay Packers Season-by-Season Results
1950s (49ers, 13–5)

Season	Results	Location	Overall series	Notes
1950	Packers; 25–21	City Stadium	Packers; 1–0	First meeting at City Stadium.
1950	49ers 30–14	Kezar Stadium	Tied; 1–1	First meeting at Kezar Stadium.
1951	49ers 31–19	Kezar Stadium	49ers 2–1	
1952	49ers 24–14	Kezar Stadium	49ers 3–1	
1953	49ers 37–7	Milwaukee County Stadium	49ers 4–1	First meeting at Milwaukee County Stadium.
1953	49ers 48–14	Kezar Stadium	49ers 5–1	49ers score their most points in a game against the Packers.
1954	49ers 23–17	Milwaukee County Stadium	49ers 6–1	
1954	49ers 35–0	Kezar Stadium	49ers 7–1	49ers record their largest victory over the Packers with a 35-point differential.
1955	Packers; 27–21	Milwaukee County Stadium	49ers 7–2	
1955	Packers; 28–7	Kezar Stadium	49ers 7–3	
1956	49ers 17–16	City Stadium	49ers 8–3	Final meeting at City Stadium.
1956	49ers 38–20	Kezar Stadium	49ers 9–3	
1957	49ers 24–14	Milwaukee County Stadium	49ers 10–3	
1957	49ers 27–20	Kezar Stadium	49ers 11–3	
1958	49ers 33–12	Milwaukee County Stadium	49ers 12–3	
1958	49ers 48–21	Kezar Stadium	49ers 13–3	
1959	Packers; 21–20	Lambeau Field	49ers 13–4	First meeting at Lambeau Field (then called New City Stadium)
1959	Packers; 36–14	Kezar Stadium	49ers 13–5	

1960s (Packers, 12–4–1)

Season	Results	Location	Overall series	Notes
1960	Packers; 41–14	Milwaukee County Stadium	49ers 13–6	Packers score their most points in a game against the 49ers
1960	Packers; 13–0	Kezar Stadium	49ers 13–7	Packers lose 1960 NFL Championship.
1961	Packers; 30–10	Lambeau Field	49ers 13–7	
1961	49ers 22–21	Kezar Stadium	49ers 14–8	Packers win 1961 NFL Championship.
1962	Packers; 31–13	Milwaukee County Stadium	49ers 14–9	
1962	Packers; 31–21	Kezar Stadium	49ers 14–10	Packers win 1962 NFL Championship.
1963	Packers; 28–10	Milwaukee County Stadium	49ers 14–11	
1963	Packers; 21–17	Kezar Stadium	49ers 14–12	
1964	Packers; 24–14	Milwaukee County Stadium	49ers 14–13	
1964	49ers 24–14	Kezar Stadium	49ers 15–13	
1965	Packers; 27–10	Lambeau Field	49ers 15–14	
1965	Tie; 24–24	Kezar Stadium	49ers 15–14–1	Packers win 1965 NFL Championship.
1966	Packers; 20–7	Milwaukee County Stadium	Tied; 15–15–1	
1966	49ers 21–20	Kezar Stadium	49ers 16–15–1	Packers win 1966 NFL Championship and Super Bowl I.
1967	Packers; 13–0	Lambeau Field	Tied; 16–16–1	Packers win 1967 NFL Championship and Super Bowl II.
1968	49ers 27–20	Kezar Stadium	49ers 17–16–1	
1969	Packers; 14–7	Milwaukee County Stadium	Tied; 17–17–1	

1970s (49ers, 4–2)

Season	Results	Location	Overall series	Notes
1970	49ers 26–10	Kezar Stadium	49ers 18–17–1	
1972	Packers; 34–24	Milwaukee County Stadium	Tied; 18–18–1	
1973	49ers 20–6	Candlestick Park	49ers 19–18–1	First meeting at Candlestick Park.
1974	49ers 7–6	Candlestick Park	49ers 20–18–1	
1976	49ers 26–14	Lambeau Field	49ers 21–18–1	
1977	Packers; 16–14	Milwaukee County Stadium	49ers 21–19–1	

1980s (49ers, 3–2)

Season	Results	Location	Overall series	Notes
1980	Packers; 23–16	Milwaukee County Stadium	49ers 21–20–1	
1981	49ers 13–3	Milwaukee County Stadium	49ers 22–20–1	49ers win Super Bowl XVI.
1986	49ers 31–17	Milwaukee County Stadium	49ers 23–20–1	Last meeting at Milwaukee County Stadium.
1987	49ers 23–12	Lambeau Field	49ers 24–20–1	
1989	Packers; 21–17	Candlestick Park	49ers 24–21–1	49ers win Super Bowl XXIV.

1990s (Packers, 6–2)

Season	Results	Location	Overall series	Notes
1990	49ers 24–20	Lambeau Field	49ers 25–21–1	
1995 playoffs	Packers 27–17	Candlestick Park	49ers 25–22–1	NFC Divisional Round. First start in the series for Brett Favre.
1996	Packers; 23–20 (OT)	Lambeau Field	49ers 25–23–1	
1996 playoffs	Packers 35–14	Lambeau Field	49ers 25–24–1	NFC Divisional Round. Packers win Super Bowl XXXI.
1997 playoffs	Packers 23–10	3Com Park	Tied 25–25–1	NFC Championship Game. Packers lose Super Bowl XXXII.
1998	Packers; 36–22	Lambeau Field	Packers; 26–25–1	
1998 playoffs	49ers 30–27	3Com Park	Tied 26–26–1	NFC Wild Card Round. Game known as The Catch II.
1999	Packers; 20–3	3Com Park	Packers; 27–26–1	

2000s (Packers, 6–0)

Season	Results	Location	Overall series	Notes
2000	Packers; 31–28	Lambeau Field	Packers; 28–26–1	
2001 playoffs	Packers 25–15	Lambeau Field	Packers 29–26–1	NFC Wild Card Round.
2002	Packers; 20–14	3Com Park	Packers; 30–26–1	
2003	Packers; 20–10	Lambeau Field	Packers; 31–26–1	
2006	Packers; 30–19	Monster Park	Packers; 32–26–1	Last start in the series for Brett Favre.
2009	Packers; 30–24	Lambeau Field	Packers; 33–26–1	First start in the series for Aaron Rodgers.

2010s (49ers, 6–3)

Season	Results	Location	Overall series	Notes
2010	Packers; 34–16	Lambeau Field	Packers; 34–26–1	Packers win eight straight meetings. Packers win Super Bowl XLV.
2012	49ers 30–22	Lambeau Field	Packers; 34–27–1	
2012 playoffs	49ers 45–31	Candlestick Park	Packers 34–28–1	NFC Divisional Round. 49ers lose Super Bowl XLVII.
2013	49ers 34–28	Candlestick Park	Packers; 34–29–1	
2013 playoffs	49ers 23–20	Lambeau Field	Packers 34–30–1	NFC Wild Card Round.
2015	Packers; 17–3	Levi's Stadium	Packers; 35–30–1	First meeting at Levi's Stadium.
2018	Packers; 33–30	Lambeau Field	Packers; 36–30–1	
2019	49ers 37–8	Levi's Stadium	Packers; 36–31–1	
2019 playoffs	49ers 37–20	Levi's Stadium	Packers 36–32–1	NFC Championship Game. 49ers lose Super Bowl LIV.

2020s (Packers, 3–2)

Season	Results	Location	Overall series	Notes
2020	Packers; 34–17	Levi's Stadium	Packers; 37–32–1	No fans in attendance due to COVID-19 pandemic.
2021	Packers; 30–28	Levi's Stadium	Packers; 38–32–1	
2021 playoffs	49ers 13–10	Lambeau Field	Packers 38–33–1	NFC Divisional Round. Last start in the series for Aaron Rodgers.
2023 playoffs	49ers 24–21	Levi's Stadium	Packers 38–34–1	NFC Divisional Round. NFL record 10th postseason meeting between the two teams. First start in the series for Jordan Love and Brock Purdy. 49ers lose Super Bowl LVIII.
2024	Packers; 38–10	Lambeau Field	Packers; 39–34–1	Packers record their largest victory against the 49ers with a 28-point differential.

Summary of Results

Season	Season series	at Green Bay Packers	at San Francisco 49ers	Notes
Regular season	Packers 35–28–1	Packers 23–11	49ers 17–12–1	
Postseason	49ers 6–4	Tied 2–2	49ers 4–2	NFC Wild Card playoffs: 1998, 2001, 2013; NFC Divisional playoffs: 1995, 1996, 2012, 2021, 2023; NFC Championship Game: 1997, 2019
Regular and postseason	Packers 39–34–1	Packers 25–13	49ers 21–14–1	

== See also ==
- National Football League rivalries
