= 1997 Green Bay Packers season =

American football season

- Owner: Green Bay Packers, Inc.
- General manager: Ron Wolf
- President: Bob Harlan
- Head coach: Mike Holmgren
- Offensive coordinator: Sherman Lewis
- Defensive coordinator: Fritz Shurmur
- Home stadium: Lambeau Field

Results
- Record: 13–3
- Division place: 1st NFC Central
- Playoffs: Won Divisional Playoffs (vs. Buccaneers) 21–7; Won NFC Championship (at 49ers) 23–10; Lost Super Bowl XXXII (vs. Broncos) 24–31
- All-Pros: 3: QB Brett Favre (1st team); S LeRoy Butler (1st team); DE Reggie White (2nd team)
- Pro Bowlers: 6: QB Brett Favre; RB Dorsey Levens; TE Mark Chmura; DE Reggie White; SS LeRoy Butler; ST Travis Jervey

The 1997 Green Bay Packers season was their 79th season overall and their 77th in the National Football League (NFL). The season concluded with the team winning its second consecutive NFC championship, but losing 31–24 to John Elway's Denver Broncos in Super Bowl XXXII. The heavily favored team narrowly missed its opportunity to post back-to-back Super Bowl wins.

After a dominating 1996 campaign which ended with a victory in Super Bowl XXXI, many expected the Packers to repeat as champions in 1997. During training camp, star safety LeRoy Butler, among others, said that the Packers had the chance to run the table and go 19–0. This opinion drew increased coverage from the media as the Packers notched impressive victories in all five preseason games. The undefeated hype ended quickly, however, when Green Bay lost week 2 in Philadelphia.

Following a relatively slow 3–2 start, the Packers caught fire in the second half of the season, finishing with a 13–3 regular season record and 8–0 home record for the second consecutive year. In the playoffs, Green Bay defeated the Tampa Bay Buccaneers at Lambeau Field in the divisional round, and San Francisco 49ers at 3Com Park in the NFC Championship. Some in the media dubbed the NFC title game as "the real Super Bowl" because of the 49ers' and Packers' league dominance, and the relative inferiority of the AFC in recent Super Bowls. Green Bay's win marked the third consecutive year the team had defeated San Francisco in the playoffs.

The Packers entered Super Bowl XXXII as 11 1/2-point favorites. The point spread was likely determined by Green Bay's victory in the previous Super Bowl, the AFC's string of 13 consecutive Super Bowl losses, and Denver's blowout losses in their four previous Super Bowls appearances. The game itself was a seesaw battle, and one of the most exciting Super Bowls in history. The Broncos won the thriller 31–24, earning John Elway his first Super Bowl victory at the age of 37, and the first championship in franchise history. Years later, Brett Favre said the Broncos were far underrated, and credited Denver's innovative blitz packages and strategies, foreign to the league at that time, for confusing the Packers. Denver was also aided by a salary cap scandal, which allowed them to build a better team by covering parts of Elway and Terrell Davis' contracts with money outside of the team's designated salary.

Favre was named the league's MVP for the third year in a row in 1997. Favre is the first and only player in the history of the award to win three MVPs consecutively. The Packers became the first team to have six NFL MVP award winners.

The 1997 Packers are one of only four teams in NFL history to win seven games against teams that would go on to make the playoffs.

== Offseason ==
Additions	Subtractions
QB Steve Bono (Chiefs)	WR Desmond Howard (Raiders)
LB Seth Joyner (Cardinals)	

=== 1997 NFL draft ===
Despite picking last in the 1997 NFL draft, the Packers did well, picking up future all-pro tackle Ross Verba and free safety Darren Sharper.

1997 Green Bay Packers draft
Round	Pick	Player	Position	College	Notes
1	30	Ross Verba	Offensive tackle	Iowa	
2	60	Darren Sharper *	Safety	William & Mary	
3	90	Brett Conway	Kicker	Penn State	
4	126	Jermaine Smith	Defensive tackle	Georgia	
5	160	Anthony Hicks	Linebacker	Arkansas	
7	213	Chris Miller	Wide receiver	USC	
7	231	Terrance Lucas	Cornerback	Montana State	
7	240	Ronnie McAda	Quarterback	Army	Mr. Irrelevant
Made roster * Made at least one Pro Bowl during career

=== Undrafted free agents ===
1997 Undrafted free agents of note
Player	Position	College
Randy Kinder	Running back	Notre Dame

== Staff ==
1997 Green Bay Packers staff
Front office: President and chief executive officer – Bob Harlan; Executive vice president and general manager – Ron Wolf; Vice president of administration and chief financial officer – Mike Reinfeldt; Director of player personnel – Ted Thompson; Director of pro personnel – Reggie McKenzie; Director of college scouting – John Dorsey; Head coaches: Head coach – Mike Holmgren; Offensive coaches: Offensive coordinator – Sherman Lewis; Quarterbacks – Andy Reid; Running backs – Harry Sydney; Wide receivers – Gil Haskell; Offensive line – Tom Lovat; Assistant offensive line/tight ends – Mike Sherman	Defensive coaches: Defensive coordinator – Fritz Shurmur; Defensive line – Larry Brooks; Linebackers – Jim Lind; Defensive backs/secondary – Bob Valesente; Defensive assistant/quality control – Johnny Holland; Special teams coaches: Special teams – Nolan Cromwell; Strength and conditioning: Strength and conditioning – Kent Johnston; Assistant strength and conditioning – Barry Rubin

== Roster ==
1997 Green Bay Packers roster
Quarterbacks: 13 Steve Bono; 4 Brett Favre; 18 Doug Pederson; Running backs: 44 Chris Darkins; 24 Aaron Hayden; 30 William Henderson FB; 32 Travis Jervey; 25 Dorsey Levens; Wide receivers: 82 Don Beebe; 87 Robert Brooks; 86 Antonio Freeman; 80 Derrick Mayes; 85 Terry Mickens; 84 Bill Schroeder; Tight ends: 89 Mark Chmura; 81 Tyrone Davis; 83 Jeff Thomason	Offensive linemen: 70 Joe Andruzzi G; 67 Jeff Dellenbach C; 72 Earl Dotson OT; 77 John Michels OT; 62 Marco Rivera G; 73 Aaron Taylor G; 63 Adam Timmerman G; 78 Ross Verba OT; 64 Bruce Wilkerson OT; 52 Frank Winters C; Defensive linemen: 93 Gilbert Brown DT; 71 Santana Dotson DT; 97 Paul Frase DE; 90 Darius Holland DT; 94 Bob Kuberski DT; 95 Keith McKenzie DE; 99 Jermaine Smith DT; 92 Reggie White DE; 98 Gabe Wilkins DE	Linebackers: 55 Bernardo Harris MLB; 56 Lamont Hollinquest OLB; 54 Seth Joyner OLB; 53 George Koonce OLB; 51 Brian Williams OLB; Defensive backs: 36 LeRoy Butler SS; 26 Mark Collins FS; 33 Doug Evans CB; 38 Blaine McElmurry CB; 28 Roderick Mullen CB; 39 Mike Prior FS; 41 Eugene Robinson FS; 42 Darren Sharper SS; 37 Tyrone Williams CB; Special teams: 60 Rob Davis LS; 17 Craig Hentrich P; 8 Ryan Longwell K	Injured Reserve: 34 Edgar Bennett RB (IR); 10 Brett Conway K (IR); 58 Mike Flanagan C (PUP); 50 Anthony Hicks LB (IR); 7 Ronnie McAda QB (Military Reserve); 21 Craig Newsome CB (IR); Practice squad: 12 Ronnie Anderson WR; 29 Anthony Fogle CB; 96 Billy Lyon DT; 47 Kyle Wachholtz TE; 53 active, 6 inactive, 4 practice squad Rookies in italics

== Schedule ==
=== Preseason ===
Date	Opponent	Result	Game site	Record	Attendance
July 26, 1997	Miami Dolphins	**W** 20–0	Lambeau Field	1–0	59,089
July 31, 1997	New England Patriots	**W** 7–3	Lambeau Field	2–0	60,778
August 8, 1997	at Oakland Raiders	**W** 37–24	Oakland–Alameda County Coliseum	3–0	42,956
August 16, 1997	at Buffalo Bills	**W** 35–3	SkyDome (Toronto, ON)	4–0	53,896
August 22, 1997	New York Giants	**W** 22–17	Camp Randall Stadium (Madison, WI)	5–0	76,704

=== Regular season ===
The Packers finished the 1997 regular season with a 13–3 record, clinching first place in the NFC Central division, as well as a first-round playoff bye.

Week	Date	Opponent	Result	Record	Venue	Attendance
1	September 1	**Chicago Bears**	**W** 38–24	1–0	Lambeau Field	60,766
2	September 7	at Philadelphia Eagles	**L** 9–10	1–1	Veterans Stadium	66,803
3	September 14	Miami Dolphins	**W** 23–18	2–1	Lambeau Field	60,075
4	September 21	**Minnesota Vikings**	**W** 38–32	3–1	Lambeau Field	60,115
5	September 28	at **Detroit Lions**	**L** 15–26	3–2	Pontiac Silverdome	78,110
6	October 5	**Tampa Bay Buccaneers**	**W** 21–16	4–2	Lambeau Field	60,100
7	October 12	at **Chicago Bears**	**W** 24–23	5–2	Soldier Field	62,212
8	Bye					
9	October 27	at New England Patriots	**W** 28–10	6–2	Foxboro Stadium	59,972
10	November 2	**Detroit Lions**	**W** 20–10	7–2	Lambeau Field	60,126
11	November 6	St. Louis Rams	**W** 17–7	8–2	Lambeau Field	60,093
12	November 16	at Indianapolis Colts	**L** 38–41	8–3	RCA Dome	60,928
13	November 23	Dallas Cowboys	**W** 45–17	9–3	Lambeau Field	60,111
14	December 1	at **Minnesota Vikings**	**W** 27–11	10–3	Hubert H. Humphrey Metrodome	64,001
15	December 7	at **Tampa Bay Buccaneers**	**W** 17–6	11–3	Houlihan's Stadium	73,523
16	December 14	at Carolina Panthers	**W** 31–10	12–3	Ericsson Stadium	70,887
17	December 20	Buffalo Bills	**W** 31–21	13–3	Lambeau Field	60,108

Note: Intra-division opponents are in bold text.

== Game summaries ==
=== Week 1 ===
Team	1	2	3	4	Total
Bears	0	11	0	13	24
• Packers	3	15	6	14	38

- Date: September 1
- Location: Lambeau Field, Green Bay, Wisconsin
- Game start: 9:00 p.m. EST
- Game attendance: 60,766
- Game weather: 69 °F (21 °C), wind 8 mph (13 km/h)
- Television network: ABC

Scoring summary
1	GB	Ryan Longwell 38 yard field goal	Packers 3–0
2	CHI	Raymont Harris 1 yard run (Jim Flanigan pass from Todd Sauerbrun)	Bears 8–3
2	GB	Jeff Thomason 1 yard pass from Brett Favre (Dorsey Levens pass from Brett Favre)	Packers 11–8
2	CHI	Jeff Jaeger 42 yard field goal	Tie 11–11
2	GB	Robert Brooks 18 yard pass from Brett Favre (Ryan Longwell kick)	Packers 18–11
3	GB	Ryan Longwell 36 yard field goal	Packers 21–11
3	GB	Ryan Longwell 29 yard field goal	Packers 24–11
4	GB	Dorsey Levens 1 yard run (Ryan Longwell kick)	Packers 31–11
4	CHI	Ricky Proehl 22 yard pass from Erik Kramer (pass failed)	Packers 31–17
4	GB	Gabe Wilkins 1 yard fumble return (Ryan Longwell kick)	Packers 38–17
4	CHI	Raymont Harris 68 yard run (Jeff Jaeger kick)	Packers 38–24

=== Week 2 ===
Team	1	2	3	4	Total
Packers	0	6	3	0	9
• Eagles	0	0	3	7	10

- Date: September 7
- Location: Veterans Stadium, Philadelphia
- Game start: 4:00 p.m. EST
- Game attendance: 66,803
- Game weather: 70 °F (21 °C), wind 8 mph (13 km/h)
- Television network: FOX

Scoring summary
2	GB	Ryan Longwell 22 yard field goal	Packers 3–0
2	GB	Ryan Longwell 18 yard Field Goal	Packers 6–0
3	PHI	Chris Boniol 32 yard Field Goal	Packers 6–3
3	GB	Ryan Longwell 27 yard Field Goal	Packers 9–3
4	PHI	Freddie Solomon 2 yard pass from Ty Detmer (Chris Boniol Kick)	Eagles 10–9

=== Week 7 ===
Team	1	2	3	4	Total
• Packers	0	14	7	3	24
Bears	10	0	7	6	23

- Date: October 12
- Location: Soldier Field, Chicago
- Game start: 1:00 p.m. EST
- Game attendance: 62,212
- Game weather: 68 °F (20 °C); wind 15 mph (24 km/h)
- Television network: Fox

Scoring summary
Q1	CHI	Raymont Harris 1 yard run (Jeff Jaeger kick)	CHI 7–0
Q1	CHI	Jeff Jaeger 41 yard field goal	CHI 10–0
Q2	GB	Mark Chmura 2 yard pass from Brett Favre (Ryan Longwell kick)	CHI 10–7
Q2	GB	Dorsey Levens 1 yard run (Ryan Longwell kick)	GB 14–10
Q3	CHI	Erik Kramer 3 yard run (Jeff Jaeger kick)	CHI 17–14
Q3	GB	Mark Chmura 12 yard pass from Brett Favre (Ryan Longwell kick)	GB 21–17
Q4	GB	Ryan Longwell 37 yard field goal	GB 24–17
Q4	CHI	Chris Penn 22 yard pass from Erik Kramer (pass failed)	GB 24–23

=== Week 12 ===
The Packers suffered a shocking loss to the 0–10 Indianapolis Colts, but did not lose another game until the Super Bowl.

== Standings ==
NFC Central
	W	L	T	PCT	PF	PA	STK
^{(2)} Green Bay Packers	13	3	0	.813	422	282	W5
^{(4)} Tampa Bay Buccaneers	10	6	0	.625	299	263	W1
^{(5)} Detroit Lions	9	7	0	.563	379	306	W2
^{(6)} Minnesota Vikings	9	7	0	.563	354	359	W1
Chicago Bears	4	12	0	.250	263	421	L1

== Playoffs ==
Round	Date	Opponent (seed)	Result	Record	Stadium	Attendance
Wild Card	First-round bye					
NFC Divisional Playoff	January 4, 1998	Tampa Bay Buccaneers (4)	W 21–7	1–0	Lambeau Field	60,327
NFC Championship Game	January 11, 1998	San Francisco 49ers (1)	W 23–10	2–0	Candlestick Park	68,987
Super Bowl XXXII	January 25, 1998	Denver Broncos (A4)	L 31–24	2–1	Qualcomm Stadium	68,912

=== NFC Divisional Game vs. Tampa Bay Buccaneers ===
NFC Divisional Game vs. Tampa Bay Buccaneers – Game summary

Quarter	1	2	3	4	Total
Buccaneers	0	0	7	0	7
Packers	7	6	0	8	21

at Lambeau Field

- Date: January 4, 1998
- Game time: 11:30 p.m. PDT
- Game weather: 27 °F (−3 °C), relative humidity 79%, wind 17 mph (27 km/h)

=== NFC Championship Game at. San Francisco 49ers ===
NFC Championship at San Francisco 49ers – Game summary

Quarter	1	2	3	4	Total
Packers	3	10	0	10	23
49ers	0	3	0	7	10

at 3Com Park

- Date: January 11, 1998
- Game time: 1 p.m. PDT
- Game weather: 54 °F (12 °C), relative humidity 90%, wind 10 mph (16 km/h)

=== Super Bowl XXXII vs. Denver Broncos ===
Super Bowl XXXII vs. Denver Broncos – Game summary

Quarter	1	2	3	4	Total
Packers	7	7	3	7	24
Broncos	7	10	7	7	31

at Qualcomm Stadium

- Date: January 25, 1998
- Game time: 3:30 p.m. PDT
- Game weather: 59 °F (15 °C), relative humidity 79%, wind 6 mph (9.7 km/h)

The Packers advanced to their fourth Super Bowl appearance, which was also their second consecutive appearance. Despite being favored by double digits, they were denied their fourth ring, as well as their second consecutive championship, by John Elway and the Denver Broncos, who defeated them 31–24. To date, the loss is the only Packers' Super Bowl loss in team history.

== Awards and records ==
- Brett Favre, NFC leader, completions (304)
- Brett Favre, NFC leader, passing yards (3,867)
- Brett Favre, NFC leader, touchdown passes (35)
- Brett Favre, NFL most valuable player
- Brett Favre, NFC Pro Bowl selection
- Brett Favre, All-Pro selection
- Brett Favre, Best NFL Player ESPY Award
- Brett Favre, First Player to win Three Consecutive MVP Awards
- Robert Brooks, National Football League Comeback Player of the Year Award
