= The Catch II =

1999 National Football League playoff game

Green Bay Packers (5) (11–5)	San Francisco 49ers (4) (12–4)
27	30
Head coach: Mike Holmgren	Head coach: Steve Mariucci
	1	2	3	4	Total
GB	3	14	0	10	27
SF	7	3	10	10	30
- Date: January 3, 1999
- Stadium: 3Com Park; San Francisco, California, U.S.
- Favorite: 49ers by 3
- Referee: Gerald Austin
- Attendance: 66,506

TV in the United States
- Network: Fox
- Announcers: Pat Summerall and John Madden

The Catch II was a National Football League (NFL) Wild Card Playoff game between the Green Bay Packers and the San Francisco 49ers on January 3, 1999. The game, which was played at 3Com Park in San Francisco, California, United States, became notable after a completed pass with eight seconds left in the fourth quarter won the game for the 49ers. The 49ers, who had just lost the lead to the Packers late in the fourth, were facing third down and three yards to go, when San Francisco wide receiver Terrell Owens caught a 25-yard touchdown pass from quarterback Steve Young, enabling the 49ers to defeat the Packers, 30–27. It came at the end of a 9-play, 76-yard drive engineered by Young.

This game and moment mirrors a similar catch in 49ers history, when quarterback Joe Montana threw to receiver Dwight Clark in the 1981 NFC Championship Game, and is similarly regarded as one of the most memorable events in NFL history, and a significant moment in Owens's NFL career. Controversial decisions by the game officials led to rule changes related to challenging calls on the field and the use of instant replay. The game was the first postseason victory for the 49ers over the Packers in the previous four meetings and is an important part of the teams' rivalry.

== Background ==
The San Francisco 49ers went 12–4 during the 1998 NFL season and entered as the fourth seed in the playoffs after clinching a Wild Card berth. San Francisco won six out of their last eight games, but did not secure the NFC West, which was won by Atlanta Falcons. The Green Bay Packers went 11–5 and entered the playoffs as the fifth seed, also clinching a Wild Card berth. Green Bay won their last three games of the season, but the Vikings won the NFC Central after going 15–1. This was the fourth playoff game between the 49ers and Packers in the 1990s, which helped establish the teams' rivalry. The Packers had won the three previous games, including the 1997 NFC Championship Game. In the lead-up to the game, ESPN gave the Packers the overall advantage in a head-to-head comparison, noting that the 49ers only outpaced the Packers in their pass offense versus the Packers' pass defense. However, the 49ers were ultimately favored by three points.

== Game summary ==
=== First half ===
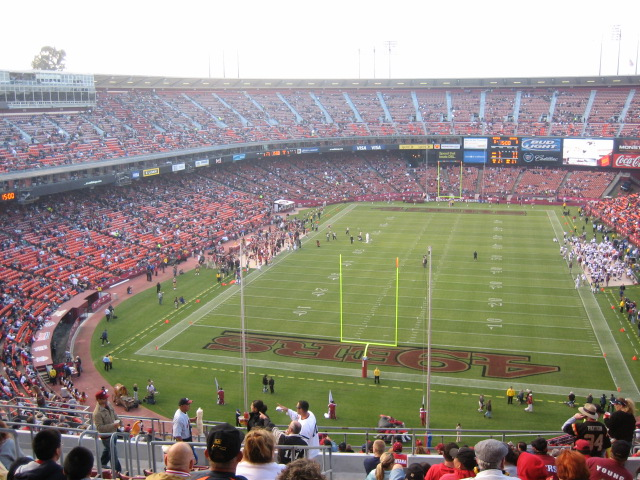
3Com Park in San Francisco, California, the site of the game.

The Packers scored first, with Ryan Longwell converting a 23-yard field goal on a 10-play, 48-yard drive. The Packers recovered Terrell Owens at mid-field to kick-off the drive and take an early 3–0 lead. Later in the first quarter, the 49ers returned the favor, recovering Dorsey Levens' fumble on the Packers 19-yard line. After two rushes gained 18 yards, Steve Young threw a 1-yard pass to Greg Clark for the touchdown putting the 49ers up 7–3. The Packers then drove 62 yards on 9 plays, scoring touchdown on a 2-yard pass from Brett Favre to Antonio Freeman. Levens converted a short 4th down play for 22 yards to put the Packers in scoring position. San Francisco quickly tied the game 10–10 on a 34-yard Wade Richey field goal, after a short 8-play, 37-yard drive. Just before the end of the half, Levens capped off a 7-play, 83-yard drive with a 2-yard touchdown run to put the Packers up 17–10. The Packers gained 30 yards on 2, 15-yard penalties on the 49ers during the same play.

=== Second half ===
The 49ers' Lee Woodall intercepted a Favre pass, kickstarting a 5-play, 33-yard drive that ended in an 8-yard touchdown catch by Clark to tie the game at 17–17. San Francisco took the lead later in the third quarter on an 11-play, 48-yard drive over at their own 22-yard line. From there, the 49ers' drive ended in a 48-yard field goal by Richey at the Packers' 33 to put the score at 20–17. The Packers scored right after the start the 4th quarter on a Longwell 37-yard field goal. The 11-play, 60-yard drive brought the score even again, 20–20. The 49ers took the lead again, driving 51 yards to convert a 40-yard field goal. The drive included a 34 yard, over-the-shoulder catch by Owens. Favre connected with Freeman for his second touchdown reception of the game, a 15-yard pass that ended a 9-play, 89-yard drive. The 49ers took possession of the ball with just under two minutes left to play in the game, down 27–23.

==== The play ====
Summerall: Three-man rush, and Young stumbles on the way back and fires up the middle—pass is caught by Owens! Owens made the catch!
Madden: Holy moly! Whew! This is amazing! Terrell Owens was having a rotten day, but on one play here, does he make up for it!

— Pat Summerall and John Madden calling the touchdown catch by Owens.

Facing 3rd and 3 with eight seconds left in the game, the 49ers lined up at the Green Bay 25-yard line. From the snap, Young stumbled and almost fell, but regained his balance. He then passed the ball down the middle to Owens, who was between five Packers defenders, catching the ball in the end zone near the goal line for the touchdown reception with three seconds left to play. Owens, securing the victory after a terrible offensive game, was overcome with emotion as he hugged head coach Steve Mariucci. After the game, Owens reflected on the catch, saying, "I was just happy I caught the ball. I knew I had to come back and make a big play after all those drops. I let the team down in the beginning, but luckily I got to come back and make a big play in the end." Coach Mariucci added, "[Owens] was beside himself. I couldn't tell if he was hurt or crying. It was just very emotional".

==== End of the game ====
On the ensuing kickoff, Roell Preston was able to return the ball to his team's own 45-yard line, but fumbled out of bounds as time expired, giving the 49ers the victory over the Packers, 30–27.

Young finished the game with 182 yards passing and three touchdowns, although he also had two interceptions. Favre threw for 292 yards and two passing touchdowns, although he also had two interceptions. Including two fumbles lost by Green Bay and one lost by San Francisco, the game had 7 total turnovers. The Packers also missed a field goal.

=== Box score ===
Wild Card: Green Bay Packers at San Francisco 49ers – Game summary

Quarter	1	2	3	4	Total
Packers	3	14	0	10	27
49ers	7	3	10	10	30

at 3Com Park, San Francisco, California

- Game time: 4:00 p.m. EST/1:00 p.m. PST
- Game weather: 54 °F (12 °C), clear
- Game attendance: 66,506
- Referee: Gerald Austin
- TV announcers (Fox): Pat Summerall (play-by-play) and John Madden (color commentator)
- Sources: Pro-Football-Reference.com and Green Bay Press-Gazette

Game information

1st quarter

- GB – Ryan Longwell 23-yard field goal, 10:14. Packers 3–0. Drive: 10 plays, 48888 yards, 4:26.
- SF – Greg Clark 1-yard pass from Steve Young (Wade Richey extra point), 5:01. 49ers 7–3. Drive: 3 plays, 19 yards, 1:26.

2nd quarter

- GB – Antonio Freeman 2-yard pass from Brett Favre (Ryan Longwell extra point), Packers 10–7. Drive: 9 plays, 62 yards, 4:14.
- SF – Wade Richey 34-yard field goal, 7:45. Tie 10–10. Drive: 8 plays, 37 yards, 3:55.
- GB – Dorsey Levens 2-yard run (Ryan Longwell extra point), 0:36. Packers 17–10. Drive: 7 plays, 83 yards, 3:22.

3rd quarter

- SF – Greg Clark 8-yard pass from Steve Young (Wade Richey extra point), 9:53. Tie 17–17. Drive: 5 plays, 33 yards, 2:01.
- SF – Wade Richey 48-yard field goal, 2:56. 49ers 20–17. Drive: 11 plays, 48 yards, 5:33.

4th quarter

- GB – Ryan Longwell 37-yard field goal, 12:33. Tie 20–20. Drive: 11 plays, 60 yards, 5:21.
- SF – Wade Richey 40-yard field goal, 7:08. 49ers 23–20. Drive: 10 plays, 51 yards, 5:39.
- GB – Antonio Freeman 15-yard pass from Brett Favre (Ryan Longwell extra point), 2:00. Packers 27–23. Drive: 9 plays, 89 yards, 2:23.
- SF – Terrell Owens 25-yard pass from Steve Young (Wade Richey extra point), 0:08. 49ers 30–27. Drive: 9 plays, 76 yards, 1:53.

Green Bay Packers stats

Passing

- Brett Favre – 20/35, 292 yards, 2 touchdowns, 1 interception

Rushing

- Dorsey Levens – 27 rushes, 116 yards, 1 touchdown
- Antonio Freeman – 1 rush, 5 yards

Receiving

- Dorsey Levens – 6 receptions, 37 yards
- Antonio Freeman – 4 receptions, 75 yards, 2 touchdowns
- William Henderson – 3 receptions, 55 yards
- Corey Bradford – 2 receptions, 53 yards
- Robert Brooks – 2 receptions, 31 yards
- Derrick Mayes – 1 reception, 20 yards
- Mark Chmura – 1 reception, 12 yards
- Tyrone Davis – 1 reception, 9 yards
San Francisco 49ers stats

Passing

- Steve Young – 18/32, 182 yards, 3 touchdowns, 2 interceptions

Rushing

- Garrison Hearst – 22 rushes, 128 yards
- Terry Kirby – 5 rushes, 32 yards
- Steve Young – 3 rushes, 16 yards
- Marc Edwards – 1 rushes, 2 yards

Receiving

- J. J. Stokes – 5 receptions, 58 yards
- Terrell Owens – 3 receptions, 73 yards, 1 touchdown
- Garrison Hearst – 3 receptions, 15 yards
- Greg Clark – 3 receptions, 13 yards, 2 touchdowns
- Terry Kirby – 2 receptions, 14 yards
- Jerry Rice – 1 receptions, 6 yards
- Marc Edwards – 1 receptions, 3 yards

=== Analysis ===
Dorsey Levens, as well as the Packers as a whole, set a number of records in the game. Levens set three career records and three single-game records, including becoming the team's leader in career postseason rushing yards. Antonio Freeman also set a new team postseason record with seven career receiving touchdowns. Roell Preston had 194 kick return yards in the game, beating the previous Packers' postseason record by 40 yards. The Packers set two team playoff game records: most total first downs (24) and most rushing first downs (20).

With 40 seconds left in the game during the 49ers' final drive, Young completed a pass to Jerry Rice for a gain of 6 yards to the Packers' 47. At the time, Rice had been held in check by the Packers' defense, having not recorded a catch up to that point. However, on the tackle by Bernardo Harris, a clear fumble was forced and recovered by the Packers, but not seen by the officials. On the television broadcast replay, the ball appeared to be forced out of Rice's hand, punched out by safety Scott McGarrahan, before Rice's knee hit the ground. At the time of this game, instant replay rules were not instated in the NFL, in which the play could be easily challenged and overturned. A fumble recovery would have given the Packers the ball and effectively ended the game for a Packers' victory. After the game, Rice deflected questions on whether he fumbled the ball. However, Packers' players, coaches and executive complained about the poor officiating and argued for the implementation of instant replay to avoid these types of impactful calls. Shortly after the missed fumble, the referees also called a pass as incomplete that Packers' players felt was an interception, a play which would have also effectively ended the game.

One of the biggest stories of the game was Terrell Owens and his struggles on offense prior to the game-winning touchdown catch. After the game, Owens commented on his performance before the historic catch saying: "I let the team down. I was horrible". He had fumbled early in the game and had four dropped passes. One of those dropped passes would have been a touchdown. He had only recorded 2 receptions for 48 yards before the game-winning touchdown catch.

== Outcome ==
The game ended up being Mike Holmgren's last as head coach of the Packers. Shortly after, he resigned to take the head coach and general manager positions with the Seattle Seahawks. The 49ers moved on to the NFC Divisional round, where they lost to the Atlanta Falcons 20–18. The Falcons intercepted Young three times, including a William White interception at midfield that sealed the victory for the Falcons. The 49ers took a hit when Garrison Hearst broke his leg on the first play from scrimmage.

=== Replay rule change ===
Following the missed Jerry Rice fumble, outcry rippled throughout the NFL and the Packers organization for the league to institute a new instant replay review system. Packers general manager Ron Wolf said about the NFL's missed calls, "It's time we do something about it in the NFL. To turn a game around like this...I'm not alone in this. This is not the regular season and next week you can strap it on and play again. We have to go home now". The NFL previously used a review system from 1986 to 1991. In response to the controversial calls during this game and others, during the 1999 off-season, the league implemented a new "challenge" system. Coaches were allowed two challenges per game before the final two minutes of each half to notify officials of a missed call: a lost challenge costs the team one available timeout, while a correct costs none. After the two-minute warning of both halves, and in overtime, all reviews will be initiated by the replay assistant in the press box replay booth, as many times as necessary. Though, before the 2006 season, an electronic pager was used instead of the modern-day challenge flag.

=== Legacy ===
The Catch II went down in 49ers–Packers history, as a culmination of San Francisco finally winning one of their many postseason meetings in the 1990s. The NFL called the game and the catch "one of the most amazing finishes in NFL postseason history" and was ranked as #24 on the NFL's top 100 greatest games. In June 2020, NBC Sports Bay Area put it at No. 12 in a top 20 list of great 49ers plays. As for Owens, the moment was one of his first memorable plays with the 49ers that eventually led to a Hall of Fame NFL career. Reflecting on the play in July 2019, Owens said, "I don't know where I would be if it weren't for that play to be honest. If you take that one catch, that one touchdown away from me, I don't know where I would be. It was a play that really catapulted my career".

Thirteen years later, another version of "The Catch", dubbed "The Catch III", went down in 49ers history in the 2011 NFC Divisional Playoffs against the New Orleans Saints. Once again, with San Francisco trailing late in the game, 49ers quarterback Alex Smith connected with tight end Vernon Davis in the end zone for the game winning touchdown reception with 9 seconds left to go in the game, giving San Francisco the victory over the Saints, 36–32.

== See also ==
- List of nicknamed NFL games and plays
