= Dorsey Levens =

American football player (born 1970)

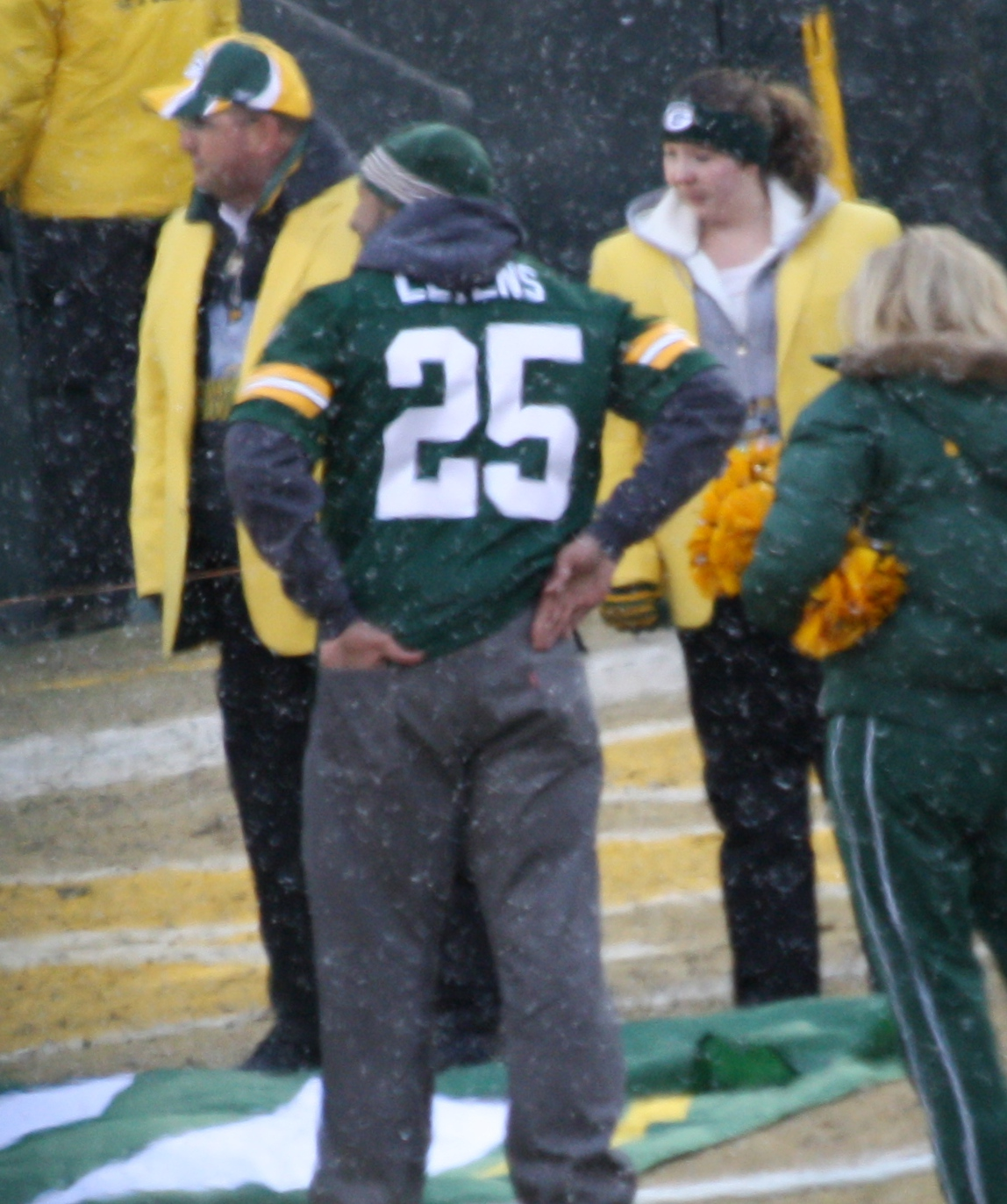

No. 25, 28
- Position: Running back

Personal information
- Born: May 21, 1970 (age 56); Syracuse, New York, U.S.
- Listed height: 6 ft 1 in (1.85 m)
- Listed weight: 230 lb (104 kg)

Career information
- High school: Nottingham (Syracuse)
- College: Notre Dame (1989–1990); Georgia Tech (1992–1993)
- NFL draft: 1994: 5th round, 149th overall pick

Career history
- Green Bay Packers (1994–2001); Philadelphia Eagles (2002); New York Giants (2003); Philadelphia Eagles (2004)

Awards and highlights
- Super Bowl champion (XXXI); Pro Bowl (1997); Green Bay Packers Hall of Fame; First-team All-ACC (1993)

Career NFL statistics
- Rushing yards: 4,955
- Rushing average: 4
- Rushing touchdowns: 36
- Receptions: 304
- Receiving yards: 2,334
- Receiving touchdowns: 17
- Stats at Pro Football Reference

Herbert Dorsey Levens (born May 21, 1970) is an American former professional football player who was a running back in the National Football League (NFL), primarily for the Green Bay Packers. He played college football for the Notre Dame Fighting Irish and later the Georgia Tech Yellow Jackets. Levens was selected by Green Bay in the fifth round of the 1994 NFL draft. He helped the Packers win the Vince Lombardi Trophy in Super Bowl XXXI against the New England Patriots.

In his career, Levens also played for the Philadelphia Eagles and New York Giants. While playing for the Packers, he rushed for 1,000 or more yards twice and was selected to the Pro Bowl after the 1997 season.

== Early life and amateur career ==
Levens was born in Syracuse, New York and attended Nottingham High School. He represented Central New York in basketball at the Empire State Games in 1987.

He began his college football career at the University of Notre Dame. However, he found himself in competition with Ricky Watters, Jerome Bettis, Rodney Culver, Reggie Brooks, and Anthony Johnson, all of whom would play in the NFL, at running back. Levens eventually earned the starting spot, but injured his knee before the season started.

The next year, he transferred to Georgia Tech, where—after sitting out a year—he set a school record by averaging 7.2 yards-per-carry. In his senior season, he was voted First-team All-ACC. He rushed for 823 yards and scored eight touchdowns that season.

- 1989 (Notre Dame): 25 carries for 132 yards and one touchdown. 3 catches for 27 yards.
- 1990 (Notre Dame): 13 carries for 53 yards and 2 touchdowns. 1 catch for 20 yards.
- 1992 (Georgia Tech): 55 carries for 213 yards and 2 touchdowns. 13 catches for 142 yards and one touchdown.
- 1993 (Georgia Tech): 114 carries for 823 yards and 8 touchdowns. 8 catches for 134 yards and one touchdown.

== Professional career ==
Due in part to his injury, Levens was considered to be a marginal pick in the 1994 NFL draft, and Mel Kiper Jr. labeled him the most overrated pick on the board. He was selected in the fifth round (149th overall) by the Green Bay Packers.

=== Green Bay Packers ===
In his first two seasons with the Packers, Levens was primarily used as a fullback, winning the starting job in 1995.

In 1996, he would play as back-up at halfback to starter Edgar Bennett, with William Henderson as the starter at fullback. In the 1996 NFC Championship game against the Carolina Panthers, Levens had a breakout game, carrying the ball 10 times for 88 yards and caught 5 passes including the Packers' first touchdown on a contested 29-yarder in the endzone in the first quarter of the 30–13 win. In Super Bowl XXXI, Levens was the Packers' leading rusher, carrying the ball 14 times for 61 yards, as the Packers won their first Super Bowl in 29 years, 35–21.

In 1997, Levens became the starting halfback after Edgar Bennett tore his achilles tendon in the 1997 pre-season. Levens rushed for over 1,400 yards and was voted to the Pro Bowl.

He broke his fibula during the 1998 season and was never the same. He was able to come back into the starting lineup late in the season, and showed some major flashes against the San Francisco 49ers in the Wild Card Round of the playoffs, rushing 27 times for 116 yards and a touchdown. He also caught 6 passes for 37 yards in a game that would later be dubbed The Catch II after Terrell Owens' last-second, game-winning touchdown catch.

He gained 1,034 yards for the Packers in the 1999 season, but suffered a pair of knee injuries during the 2000 season, and was mostly used in a reserve role after Ahman Green supplanted him as the starter.

During the final game of the 1999 NFL season, Levens and the Packers were involved in what has been described as a bizarre tie-breaking scenario, involving four teams that finished with 8–8 records fighting for two playoff spots. The two losers of the tie breaker would be eliminated. Going into their season finale against the Arizona Cardinals, the Packers needed to win their game, as well as have the Dallas Cowboys lose later that afternoon. In addition, the Packers also needed to win the net points scored tie-breaker vs. the Carolina Panthers (who were facing the New Orleans Saints). The Packers and Panthers were playing during the noon time slot and the Packers held a net 18 point advantage going into the day. As the games progressed, Carolina had built a sizable lead to the point that they were momentarily able to take the lead over the Packers in net points. Since both teams were neck and neck for the advantage in the tie breaker, both teams were frantically trying to score as many points as possible despite leading on the scoreboard by a blowout margin. The Cardinals and Saints also tried to score frantically as the game progressed to stop their opponents from gaining the net points advantage. Ultimately, the Packers prevailed in net points by +11. It was all for naught in the end, however, as the Cowboys won their afternoon contest against the New York Giants to claim the final playoff spot and thus eliminate the Packers from playoff contention. Levens ran for 146 yards and scored four times during the contest. The Packers won their game 49–24 and the Panthers won their game 45–13.

Levens was featured on the cover of EA Sports Madden NFL 2000 in the PAL editions. As a result, he is viewed as one of the first victims of the "Madden Curse".

Levens was released by the Packers after 2001. In 2009, he was inducted into the Green Bay Packers Hall of Fame.

=== Later career ===
During the 2002 season, Levens played for the Philadelphia Eagles, replacing the injured Correll Buckhalter, and in 2003, with the New York Giants, both times as a backup. He was released by the Giants after 2003. After Buckhalter was again injured during the 2004 preseason, Levens was signed by the Eagles as a free agent. He shared duties with Brian Westbrook through the season, also appearing in Super Bowl XXXIX that year. He retired during the 2006 offseason as a Green Bay Packer.

== NFL career statistics ==
Rushing stats

Year	Team	GP	Att	Yards	Avg	Lng	TD	FD	Fum	Lost
1994	GB	14	5	15	3.0	5	0	1	0	0
1995	GB	15	36	120	3.3	22	3	18	0	0
1996	GB	16	121	566	4.7	24	5	31	2	0
1997	GB	16	329	1,435	4.4	52	7	68	5	3
1998	GB	7	115	378	3.3	50	1	20	0	0
1999	GB	14	279	1,034	3.7	36	9	56	5	5
2000	GB	5	77	224	2.9	17	3	13	0	0
2001	GB	15	44	165	3.8	40	0	6	0	0
2002	PHI	16	75	411	5.5	47	1	13	1	1
2003	NYG	11	68	197	2.9	17	3	14	0	0
2004	PHI	15	94	410	4.4	45	4	24	0	0
Career		144	1,243	4,955	4.0	52	36	264	13	9

Receiving stats

Year	Team	GP	Rec	Yards	Avg	Lng	TD	FD	Fum	Lost
1994	GB	14	1	9	9.0	9	0	0	0	0
1995	GB	15	48	434	9.0	27	4	24	0	0
1996	GB	16	31	226	7.3	49	5	14	0	0
1997	GB	16	53	370	7.0	56	5	18	0	0
1998	GB	7	27	162	6.0	17	0	7	0	0
1999	GB	14	71	573	8.1	53	1	26	0	0
2000	GB	5	16	146	9.1	37	0	9	0	0
2001	GB	15	24	159	6.6	19	1	7	0	0
2002	PHI	16	19	124	6.5	24	1	6	0	0
2003	NYG	11	5	39	7.8	11	0	2	0	0
2004	PHI	15	9	92	10.2	23	0	5	0	0
Career		144	304	2,334	7.7	56	17	118	0	0

== Retirement ==
After retiring from the NFL, Levens became an NFL analyst for the sports website PlayerPress.com. There, he picks NFL games against the spread, and against other professional athletes and experts. He also became an analyst for Sprint Exclusive Entertainment's NFL Mobile Gamecenter, where he breaks down all the NFL games for viewers each week. In 2009, Levens was elected to the Green Bay Packers Hall of Fame.

In 2006, Levens had a cameo appearance as the head coach for Xavier in the film We Are Marshall.

In 2012, it was confirmed that Levens is to play the role of Coach James in Gridiron UK.

In 2015, Levens had a major role in Tyler Perry's play Madea on the Run.

In 2017, Levens had a recurring role as Benny on the 6th and final season of Tyler Perry's For Better or Worse
