= Ross Verba =

American football player (born 1973)

No. 78, 77, 73
- Position: Guard

Personal information
- Born: October 31, 1973 (age 53); Des Moines, Iowa, U.S.
- Listed height: 6 ft 4 in (1.93 m)
- Listed weight: 305 lb (138 kg)

Career information
- High school: Dowling Catholic (West Des Moines, Iowa)
- College: Iowa
- NFL draft: 1997: 1st round, 30th overall pick

Career history
- Green Bay Packers (1997–2000); Cleveland Browns (2001–2004); Detroit Lions (2006)

Awards and highlights
- First-team All-Big Ten (1996)

Career NFL statistics
- Games played: 113
- Games started: 107
- Fumble recoveries: 3
- Stats at Pro Football Reference

Ross Robert Verba (born October 31, 1973) is an American former professional football player in the National Football League (NFL). A 6'4", 305-lb. guard from the University of Iowa, Verba was a first-team All-Big Ten player in 1996. He was selected by the Green Bay Packers in the 1st round (30th overall) of the 1997 NFL draft.

Verba was the first rookie to ever start a Super Bowl at left tackle, when the Packers faced the Denver Broncos in Super Bowl XXXII. He played four seasons for the Packers from 1997 to 2000, and three with the Cleveland Browns from 2001 to 2004. In June 2005, having failed to obtain an upgraded contract, Verba rebated his offseason bonus in order to obtain his release from the Browns. After one season out of the league, Verba signed with the Detroit Lions for a final NFL season in 2006. He was released by the Lions on February 28, 2007, after spending eight games inactive with various injuries and being placed on injured reserve.

Verba was arrested on January 4, 2007, in Wisconsin on a felony warrant for writing bad checks in Nevada and released one day later. According to the Wisconsin State Patrol, Nevada authorities lifted the warrant after Verba resolved a misunderstanding regarding an outstanding debt of $50,000 at the Wynn Las Vegas casino. Subsequently, Verba was arrested in 2009 on another Nevada warrant for failing to pay a $26,000 gambling debt at the Palms Resort and Casino.
