= 2019 NFC Championship Game =

2020 American football postseason game

| Green Bay Packers (2) (13-3) | San Francisco 49ers (1) (13-3) |
|---|---|
| 20 | 37 |
| Head coach: Matt LaFleur | Head coach: Kyle Shanahan |
| | 1 | 2 | 3 | 4 | Total |
|---|---|---|---|---|---|
| GB | 0 | 0 | 7 | 13 | 20 |
| SF | 7 | 20 | 7 | 3 | 37 |
- Date: January 19, 2020
- Stadium: Levi's Stadium; Santa Clara, California, U.S.
- Favorite: 49ers by 7
- Referee: John Hussey
- Attendance: 72,211

TV in the United States
- Network: Fox
- Announcers: Joe Buck, Troy Aikman, Erin Andrews, Chris Myers and Mike Pereira

The 2019 National Football Conference (NFC) Championship Game was an American football game played between the Green Bay Packers and the San Francisco 49ers on January 19, 2020, at Levi's Stadium in Santa Clara, California, United States. Both the Packers and 49ers finished the season with 13–3 records, each winning their respective divisions. The 49ers got the first seed in the playoffs owing to their 37–8 victory over the Packers in Week 12, with the Packers taking the second seed. The Packers got the second seed over the 13–3 New Orleans Saints due to their better conference record.

Both teams received first round byes during the Wild Card round. The Packers faced the Seattle Seahawks in the Divisional Round, winning 28-23. The 49ers beat the Minnesota Vikings in the Divisional Round by a score of 27–10. With their higher seeding, the 49ers hosted the Packers in the NFC Championship game. The 49ers took a 27–0 lead into halftime behind the running of Raheem Mostert. Although the Packers scored in the second half, it was not enough to overcome their deficit. Mostert rushed for 220 yards and four touchdowns in the game, while quarterback Jimmy Garoppolo set an NFC Championship Game record for fewest pass attempts with just eight. The 49ers advanced to Super Bowl LIV, where they lost 31–20 to the Kansas City Chiefs.

== Background ==
Near the end of the 2018 NFL season, the Green Bay Packers fired longtime head coach Mike McCarthy after two consecutive poor seasons. During the offseason, the team hired Matt LaFleur to be the team's new head coach. They started the 2019 season winning their first three games; they entered their bye week in Week 11 with a record of 8–2. Coming out of their bye week, the Packers suffered their worst loss of the season to the San Francisco 49ers, losing 37–8. They finished the season on a five-game win streak to finish the season with a record of 13–3.

The 49ers won their first eight games of the season. Over the next six games, they won three and lost three; all three losses were by one score or less. Each loss also occurred on the last play of the game. The 49ers ended the season with back-to-back wins to also secure a record of 13–3. A third team, the New Orleans Saints, also finished the season with a record of 13–3. Playoff seeding thus was determined by tiebreakers. The 49ers were given the first seed, as they beat both the Packers and Saints in the regular season. The Packers were awarded the second seed, as they had a better conference record than the Saints, who were given the third seed.

Both the Packers and 49ers were awarded first-round byes in the Wild Card round. The Packers hosted the Seattle Seahawks and the 49ers hosted the Minnesota Vikings in the Divisional Round; both teams won, with the Packers beating the Seahawks 28-23 and the 49ers beating the Vikings 27–10. With their higher seeding, the 49ers hosted the Packers at Levi's Stadium in Santa Clara, California, for the NFC Championship Game on January 19, 2020. The 49ers were 7-point favorites.

== Game summary ==
Levi's Stadium, shown here in 2016, was the site of the NFC Championship Game.

=== First half ===
The 49ers started the game with the ball and went three-and-out. After the ensuing punt, the Packers drove to mid-field before their drive stalled and they were forced to punt. The 49ers scored first on a six-play, 89-yard drive that included a 30-yard reception by Deebo Samuel and a 36-yard rushing touchdown by Raheem Mostert. The Packers next drive ended in another punt, which was returned by the 49ers to mid-field. The 49ers moved the ball 15 yards, close enough for a field goal attempt, which was converted by Robbie Gould to increase the lead to 10–0. On the ensuing drive, Aaron Rodgers fumbled the ball on third down, which was recovered by the Packers but forced another punt. Packers' punter J. K. Scott kicked a short punt out-of-bounds, setting up a short 37-yard touchdown drive for the 49ers. Mostert again finished the drive with a rushing touchdown, this time from nine yards out to put the 49ers up 17–0. On the Packers next drive, they began to move the ball, starting with a 23-yard catch by Jake Kumerow. Aaron Jones rushed the ball four straight times, gaining 27 yards to put the Packers on the 25-yard line. However, Rodgers fumbled the snap, which was recovered by the 49ers. The 49ers put together another scoring drive, this time ending in another field goal to put them up 20–0. On the ensuing kickoff, Tyler Ervin, the Packers kick returner, muffed the return and was only able to move the ball to the eight-yard line. The Packers picked up a first down, but Rodgers threw a deep pass intended for Geronimo Allison that was intercepted, setting up another short field for the 49ers. Mostert ran the ball three straight times, scoring his third touchdown on an 18-yard rush. The Packers got the ball back with 45 seconds left in the half, but were again forced to punt. The half ended on the punt with the 49ers up 27–0.

=== Second half ===
The Packers started the second half with an 11-play, 75-yard scoring drive for their first points of the game. Rodgers completed nine passes on the drive, capped by a nine-yard receptions by Jones for a touchdown, cutting the 49ers lead to 27–7. The 49ers responded with a seven play drive consisting of all rushes, capped by a 22-yard touchdown rush for Mostert, his fourth of the game. The Packers put together another long scoring drive, going 75 yards in 10 plays. The longest play of the drive was a 42-yard reception by Jimmy Graham that brought the ball to the one-yard line. Jones scored on the next play on a one-yard rush. The Packers attempted a two-point conversion, which failed, leaving the score at 34–13. The Packers attempted an onside kick on the next kickoff; the 49ers recovered the ball. The Packers defense stopped the 49ers, holding them to a three-and-out and a punt. The Packers put together their longest drive of the game, going 92 yards in 7 plays to score their third straight touchdown. Rodgers completed a 65-yard pass to Davante Adams on the drive, which ended on an 8-yard touchdown catch by Jace Sternberger to make the score 34–20. The 49ers next drive lasted approximately five minutes and ended in a field goal to increase their lead to 37–20. On the next drive, the Packers converted a fourth down with 13 yards to go, but Rodgers threw his second interception of the game. The 49ers knelt the ball on the next three plays, ending the game for the victory.

=== Box score ===
Green Bay Packers vs. San Francisco 49ers – Game Summary

| Quarter | 1 | 2 | 3 | 4 | Total |
|---|---|---|---|---|---|
| Packers | 0 | 0 | 7 | 13 | 20 |
| 49ers | 7 | 20 | 3 | 7 | 37 |

at Levi's Stadium, Santa Clara, California

- Date: January 19, 2020
- Game time: 5:40 p.m. CST
- Game weather: Cloudy, 58 °F (14 °C)
- Game attendance: 72,211
- Referee: John Hussey
- TV announcers (Fox): Joe Buck, Troy Aikman, Erin Andrews, Chris Myers and Mike Pereira
- Sources: ESPN.com and Pro-Football-Reference.com

Game information

First quarter

- SF – Raheem Mostert 36-yard run (Robbie Gould kick), 5:55. 49ers 7–0. Drive: 6 plays, 89 yards, 3:38.

Second quarter

- SF – Robbie Gould 54-yard field goal, 14:55. 49ers 10–0. Drive: 5 plays, 15 yards, 2:21.
- SF – Raheem Mostert 9-yard run (Robbie Gould kick), 9:12. 49ers 17–0. Drive: 6 plays, 37 yards, 3:20.
- SF – Robbie Gould 27-yard field goal, 1:57. 49ers 20–0. Drive: 8 plays, 66 yards, 3:42.
- SF – Raheem Mostert 18-yard run (Robbie Gould kick), 0:45. 49ers 27–0. Drive: 3 plays, 30 yards, 0:16.

Third quarter

- GB – Aaron Jones 9-yard pass from Aaron Rodgers (Mason Crosby kick), 8:44. 49ers 27–7. Drive: 11 plays, 75 yards, 6:16.
- SF – Raheem Mostert 22-yard run (Robbie Gould kick), 4:49. 49ers 34–7. Drive: 7 plays, 79 yards, 3:55.

Fourth quarter

- GB – Aaron Jones 1-yard run (pass failed), 14:35. 49ers 34–13. Drive: 10 plays, 75 yards, 5:14.
- GB – Jace Sternberger 8-yard pass from Aaron Rodgers (Mason Crosby kick), 8:13. 49ers 34–20. Drive: 7 plays, 92 yards, 3:12.
- SF – Robbie Gould 42-yard field goal, 3:31. 49ers 37–20. Drive: 10 plays, 49 yards, 4:42.

Green Bay Packers stats

Passing

- Aaron Rodgers – 31/39, 326 yards, 2 touchdowns, 2 interceptions

Rushing

- Aaron Jones – 12 rushes, 56 yards, 1 touchdown
- Jamaal Williams – 3 rushes, 6 yards
- Aaron Rodgers – 1 rush, 0 yards

Receiving

- Davante Adams – 9 receptions, 138 yards
- Aaron Jones – 5 receptions, 27 yards, 1 touchdown
- Jimmy Graham – 4 receptions, 59 yards
- Allen Lazard – 3 receptions, 36 yards
- Jamaal Williams – 2 receptions, 1 yard
- Marcedes Lewis – 2 receptions, 14 yards
- Jace Sternberger – 2 receptions, 13 yards
- Geronimo Allison – 2 receptions, 8 yards
- Jake Kumerow – 1 reception, 23 yards
- Tyler Ervin – 1 reception, 7 yards
San Francisco 49ers stats

Passing

- Jimmy Garoppolo – 6/8, 77 yards

Rushing

- Raheem Mostert – 29 rushes, 220 yards, 4 touchdowns
- Deebo Samuel – 2 rushes, 43 yards
- Tevin Coleman – 6 rushes, 21 yards
- Matt Breida – 1 rush, 2 yards
- Jimmy Garoppolo – 4 rushes, -1 yards

Receiving

- Deebo Samuel – 2 receptions, 46 yards
- Raheem Mostert – 2 receptions, 6 yards
- George Kittle – 1 reception, 19 yards
- Kendrick Bourne – 1 reception, 6 yards

=== Analysis ===
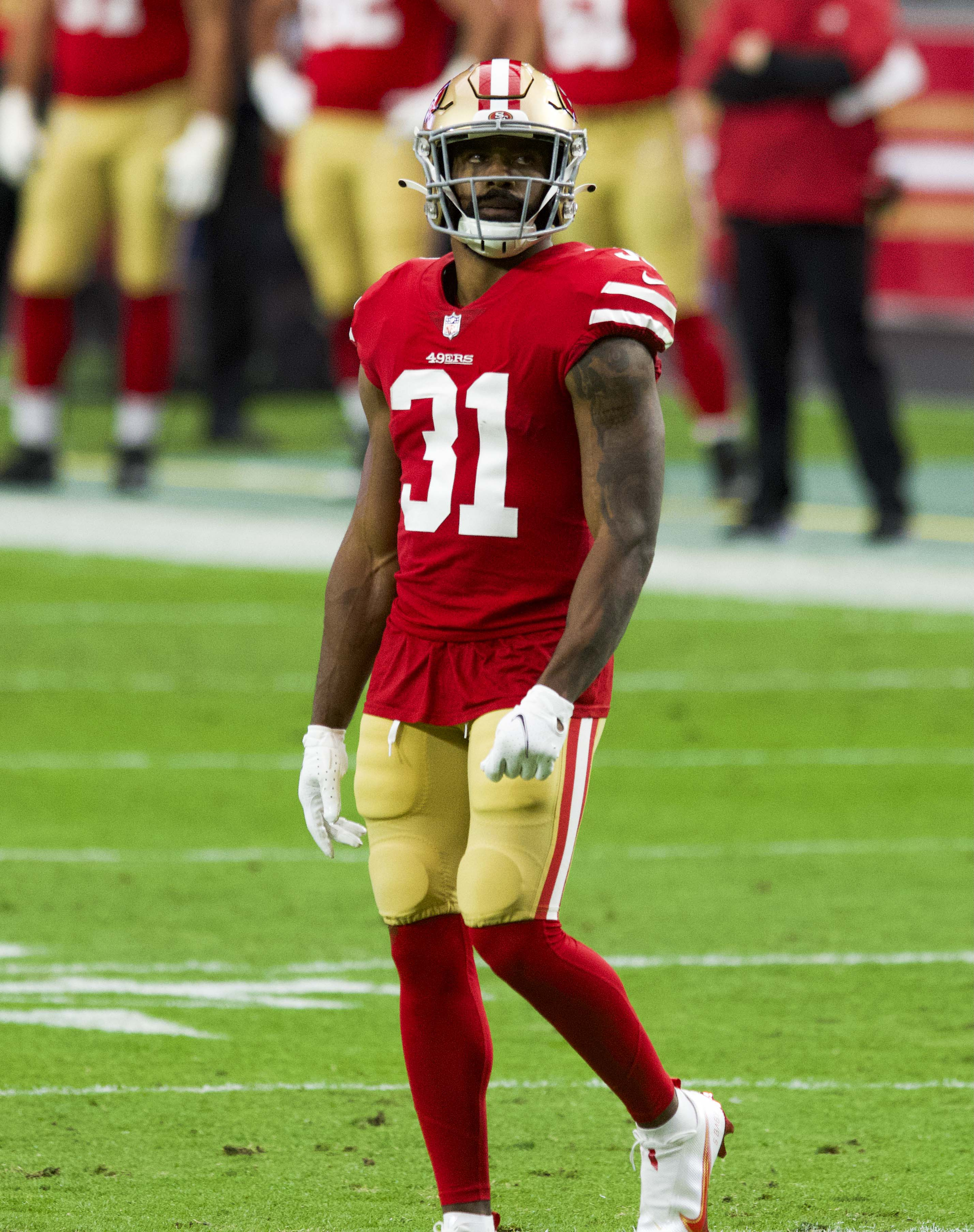
Raheem Mostert's 220-yard, 4-touchdown performance was widely recognized in post-game analysis.

From the 49ers perspective, post-game analysis focused on the large margin of victory, the rushing attack led by Mostert and the limited number of passes by Garoppolo. The poor defense by the Packers in the first half, especially in protecting against the rushing attack, was highlighted, as well as the Packers three turnovers. The 49ers game plan and play calls were widely praised. The 49ers employed a straightforward plan of attack, focusing on rushing at the Packers edge rushers, utilizing multiple tight ends to help block. The 49ers defensive performance, which included three takeaways and three sacks, was also recognized. Rodgers threw for over 300 yards and had two touchdown passes, primarily in the second half when then 49ers had a large lead. The 49ers also intercepted Rodgers twice and recovered a botched snap fumble that helped swing momentum early in the game.

== Outcome ==
The 49ers advanced to Super Bowl LIV, where they played the Kansas City Chiefs. The 49ers took a 20–10 lead into the fourth quarter, but the Chiefs rallied for three straight touchdowns in the fourth quarter to seal a 31–20 victory. The Packers returned to the NFC Championship Game the following season, again losing, this time 31–26 to the Tampa Bay Buccaneers. The 49ers went 6–10 the next season, missing the playoffs.

=== Legacy ===
The game was the eighth playoff match-up between the 49ers and Packers, extending the two teams' rivalry. The game was well known for the 49ers' overwhelmingly dominant rushing attack. It evoked a previous playoff game between the 49ers and Packers, where the 49ers again blew out the Packers with a strong rushing attack. Colin Kaepernick rush for a then-playoff record for a quarterback of 181 yards. That game also occurred in a season when the 49ers would go on to lose the Super Bowl. Mostert's 220 yards were the second-most in an NFL playoff game at the time, behind Eric Dickerson's 248 yards in 1986. He also became the first player in the NFL history to rush for more than 200 yards and score four touchdowns in a playoff game. His successful season and this playoff game helped solidify Mostert's tenure with the 49ers, after he had spent time on six different teams to start his career. The loss was the third NFC Championship Game loss for Rodgers, after the 2014 NFC Championship Game against the Seattle Seahawks and the 2016 NFC Championship Game against the Atlanta Falcons.
