= Antonio Freeman =

American football player (born 1972)

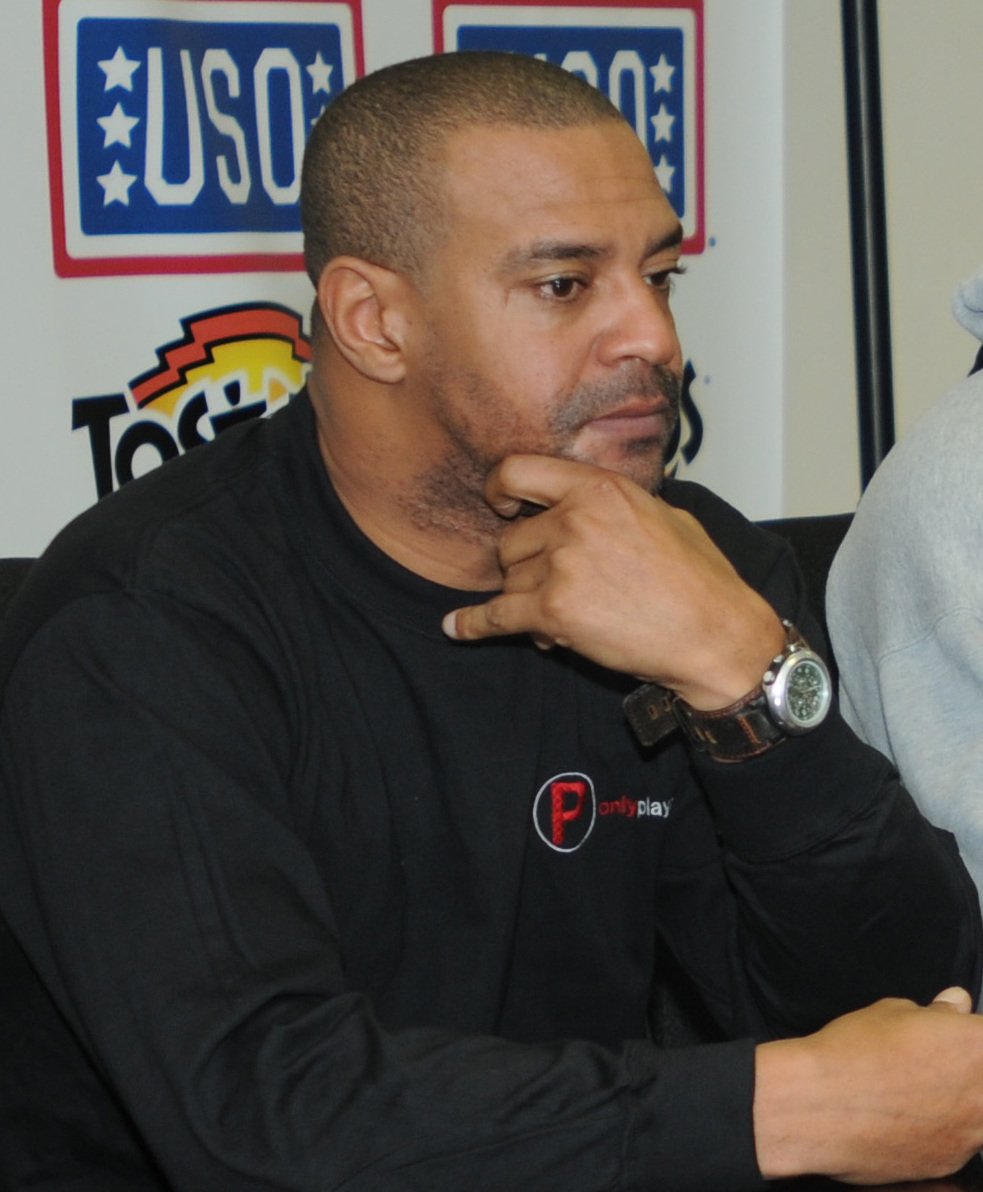
- Freeman in 2010

No. 86
- Position: Wide receiver

Personal information
- Born: May 27, 1972 (age 54); Baltimore, Maryland, U.S.
- Listed height: 6 ft 1 in (1.85 m)
- Listed weight: 198 lb (90 kg)

Career information
- High school: Baltimore Polytechnic
- College: Virginia Tech (1990–1994)
- NFL draft: 1995: 3rd round, 90th overall pick

Career history
- Green Bay Packers (1995–2001); Philadelphia Eagles (2002); Green Bay Packers (2003); Miami Dolphins (2004)*
- * Offseason or practice squad member only

Awards and highlights
- Super Bowl champion (XXXI); First-team All-Pro (1998); Pro Bowl (1998); NFL receiving yards leader (1998); Green Bay Packers Hall of Fame

Career NFL statistics
- Receptions: 477
- Receiving yards: 7,251
- Receiving touchdowns: 61
- Stats at Pro Football Reference

Antonio Michael Freeman (born May 27, 1972) is an American former professional football player who was a wide receiver in the National Football League (NFL), most notably for the Green Bay Packers. He attended the Baltimore Polytechnic Institute and Virginia Tech.

== College career ==
Freeman played college football at Virginia Tech, where he caught 121 passes for 2,207 yards and 22 touchdowns in four seasons. He also returned 64 punts for 652 yards and another touchdown, and rushed for 37 yards. His accomplishments earned him enshrinement in the Virginia Tech Sports Hall of Fame.

- 1991: 19 catches for 274 yards with 2 TD
- 1992: 32 catches for 703 yards with 6 TD
- 1993: 32 catches for 644 yards with 9 TD
- 1994: 38 catches for 586 yards with 5 TD

== Professional career ==
Pre-draft measurables
Height	Weight	Arm length	Hand span
6 ft 0 5/8 in (1.84 m)	180 lb (82 kg)	31 1/4 in (0.79 m)	8 3/8 in (0.21 m)
All values from NFL Combine

Freeman was drafted by the Green Bay Packers in the third round with the 90th overall pick in the 1995 NFL draft. In his rookie season, he returned a punt 76 yds for a touchdown during a playoff win over Atlanta. He went on to lead the Packers in receiving in four seasons from 1996 to 1999, and led the NFL in receiving in 1998.

The peak of Freeman's career occurred during his first tenure with the Green Bay Packers including a victory in Super Bowl XXXI in 1997 over the New England Patriots. During that Super Bowl, Freeman caught a then-Super Bowl record-length touchdown pass of 81 yards from Brett Favre. The record was eclipsed in Super Bowl XXXVIII when Muhsin Muhammad caught an 85-yard touchdown pass. That play would give the Packers the lead for good as they went on to win 35–21. Freeman finished the game with three receptions for 105 yards. The following year, Freeman gained over 1,200 receiving yards as Green Bay advanced to their second consecutive Super Bowl, where he caught 9 passes for 126 yards and 2 touchdowns in the 31–24 loss to the Denver Broncos. His 230 all-purpose yards in the game was the third highest total in Super Bowl history.

In 1998, Freeman had his best NFL season, catching 84 passes for a league leading 1,424 receiving yards and earning his only Pro Bowl appearance.

During overtime of a Monday night game on November 6, 2000, despite bad weather conditions, Freeman caught what initially appeared to be an incomplete pass while lying on his side—after almost being intercepted by Minnesota Vikings cornerback Cris Dishman, the ball actually bounced off multiple parts of Freeman's body without hitting the ground. Untouched by the defender, Freeman jumped to his feet and ran the ball in for the winning touchdown over the Vikings, the Packers' rival. The touchdown prompted ABC play-by-play announcer Al Michaels, who was stunned by the play, to shout, "He did WHAT?!" In 2005, ESPN labeled the catch as the greatest play in the history of Monday Night Football. Freeman has said it was the second best catch of his career (claiming his best to be an 81-yard touchdown reception in Super Bowl XXXI).

Freeman played for the Green Bay Packers from 1995 through the 2001 NFL season. After feuding with Packers Head Coach Mike Sherman in 2001, Freeman signed with the Philadelphia Eagles. His final game in his first Packers tenure was against the St. Louis Rams during the 2001 NFL playoffs. He then went on to play a year for the Eagles in 2002 before coming back to Green Bay for the 2003 season and a second tenure with the club. His final catch with the Packers occurred on the road in December 2003 during the fourth quarter of Brett Favre's phenomenal performance against the Oakland Raiders on ABC's Monday Night Football, following the death of Favre's father. He played his final game with Green Bay in the infamous "4th and 26" debacle in the NFL playoffs against the Philadelphia Eagles in January 2004. Freeman last played in the NFL with the Miami Dolphins during 2004 training camp.

In his ten NFL seasons, Freeman caught 477 passes for 7,251 yards, gained 1,007 yards returning kickoffs and punts, and scored 61 touchdowns. He played in the Pro Bowl in 1999. His teams made the playoffs in seven of his NFL seasons. He appeared in four NFC Championship Games and two Super Bowls. He ranks sixth all-time on the Green Bay Packers receivers list with 6,651 yards on 431 catches. Freeman had three 1,000 yard receiving seasons in his career, 1997–1999. Nicknamed "Free", in 2006 Freeman won a Pop Warner Award for his work with youth.

On June 16, 2007, Freeman signed with the Packers to retire with the team. He was inducted into the Green Bay Packers Hall of Fame in 2009.

== NFL career statistics ==
Legend
	Won the Super Bowl
	Led the league
**Bold**	Career high

=== Regular season ===
Year	Team	GP	Receiving						Punt returns					Kick returns				Fumbles	
Year	Team	GP	Rec	Yds	Avg	Lng	TD	FD	Ret	Yds	Lng	TD	FC	Ret	Yds	Lng	TD	Fum	Lost
1995	GB	11	8	106	13.3	28	1	7	**37**	**292**	**26**	0	3	**24**	**556**	**45**	0	0	0
1996	GB	12	56	933	16.7	51	9	46	—	—	—	—	—	1	16	16	0	**3**	**2**
1997	GB	16	81	1,243	15.3	58	12	**62**	—	—	—	—	—	—	—	—	—	1	1
1998	GB	15	**84**	**1,424**	**17.0**	**84**	**14**	59	—	—	—	—	—	—	—	—	—	0	0
1999	GB	16	74	1,074	14.5	51	6	51	—	—	—	—	—	—	—	—	—	1	0
2000	GB	15	62	912	14.7	67	9	47	—	—	—	—	—	—	—	—	—	1	1
2001	GB	16	52	818	15.7	63	6	40	17	114	29	0	**7**	2	28	24	0	0	0
2002	PHI	16	46	600	13.0	59	4	28	—	—	—	—	—	—	—	—	—	0	0
2003	GB	15	14	141	10.1	15	0	9	—	—	—	—	—	—	—	—	—	0	0
Career		132	477	7,251	15.2	84	61	349	54	406	29	0	10	27	600	45	0	6	4

== Post-playing career ==
Freeman occasionally participates as an analyst on ESPN First Take and NFL Live, mostly during NFL season. He has also appeared on ESPN College Gameday in support of his alma mater Virginia Tech. Freeman was also a commentator on Redskins Kickoff and Redskins Postgame Live for Comcast SportsNet Washington. Freeman was inducted into the Virginia Sports Hall of Fame in 2012.

Freeman has hosted his own radio show The End Zone with Antonio Freeman since 2010, the show currently airs on WTSO in Madison and WOKY in Milwaukee, Wisconsin.

== Personal life ==
He is the father of Alex Freeman, a soccer player who currently plays for Villarreal CF in La Liga, and received his first call-up to the United States men's national soccer team on May 22, 2025.
