= List of schools in Duval County, Florida =

The following is a list of the schools operated by the Duval County School Board, d/b/a Duval County Public Schools. Most of the schools listed are in Jacksonville, Florida, the county seat and its largest city by orders of magnitude. In 2021, the school board voted to rename the six schools named for Confederates.

== High schools ==
School	2021-22 enrollment	Grades	Year est.	Principal	Mascot	Notes
Alden Road Exceptional Student Center	155	6-12		Blitch, Joseph	Dolphins	School for special learning needs
Douglas Anderson School of the Arts	1,111	9-12	1985	Wilson, Tina	Puffin	Magnet school for the arts; admission only by audition or portfolio review
Atlantic Coast High School	2,414	9-12	2010	George, Michael	Stingrays	
Baldwin Middle-Senior High School	1,349	6-12	1948	Townsend, Mike	Indians	Combined middle school and high school that serves the westernmost portion of Duval County
Darnell-Cookman Middle/High School of the Medical Arts	1,130	6-12		Davis, Paul	Vikings	Beginning with the 2008-09 school year, Darnell-Cookman is transitioning from a middle school to a 6-11 (later 6-12) school.
Englewood High School	1,798	9-12		Chirino, Marleny	Rams	
First Coast High School	2,158	9-12	1990	Fluent, Justin	Buccaneers	
Duncan U. Fletcher High School	2,098	9-12	1937	Ledford, James	Senators	Named after U.S. Senator Duncan U. Fletcher
Westside High School	1,486	9-12	1958	Foster, Vincent	Wolverines	Formerly named Nathan B. Forrest High School
Grand Park Educational Center	135	9-12		Blue, Dr.Tyrone	Eagles	School for behaviorally and academically challenged students
Andrew Jackson High School	955	9-12	1928	Moreland, Truitte	Tigers	One of the two oldest high schools in Duval County. Original building shares same architectural design as Robert E. Lee High School. Many of the schools were "twinned" with other schools upon construction.
Riverside High School	1,581	9-12	1928	Feagins, Timothy	Generals	The oldest high school in Duval County. Original building shares same architectural design as Andrew Jackson High School.
Mandarin High School	2,435	9-12	1990	Bravo, Sara	Mustangs	
Marine Science Education Center	30	9-12	1968	Ledford, James		
Mt. Herman Exceptional Student Center	105	Ages 3–22		Cashen, Mark	Herons	School for profoundly mentally handicapped students
Palm Avenue Exceptional Student Center	183	6-12		Michael Alexander	Panthers	School for special learning needs and find students employment and open cases through Vocational Rehab for graduating seniors
Terry Parker High School	1,372	9-12		Hudson, Robert	Braves	
Paxon School for Advanced Studies	1,322	9-12		Turner, Royce	Eagles	A dedicated academic magnet school
Frank H. Peterson Academies of Technology	1,147	9-12		Mastromatto, Jessica	Eagles	Formerly known as the Westside Skills Center, offers several vocational programs
William M. Raines High School	1,243	9-12	1965	Hall, Vincent	Vikings	Named after a former Duval principal
A. Philip Randolph Academies of Technology	401	8-12	1979	Lewis, Robert	Jaguars	Formerly known as the Northside Skills Center, offers several vocational programs
Jean Ribault High School	1,373	9-12	1957	Bostic, Gregory D.	Trojans	named after a 16th-century French explorer
Sandalwood High School	2,752	9-12	1971	Dr.Saryn, V Hatcher	Saints	Largest school in Duval County; was originally built as a junior-senior high combination
Stanton College Preparatory School	1,420	9-12	1868	Majova-Seane, Nongongoma	Blue Devils	Founded through a program of the Freedman's Bureau, in 1980 became the county's first academic magnet school, oldest high school in Jacksonville by name
Edward H. White High School	1,453	9-12	1971	Battest, Traci	Commanders	Named after one of the astronauts who died in the Apollo 1 fire
Samuel W. Wolfson High School	901	9-12	1963	Begley, Christopher	Wolfpack	

== Middle schools ==
School	Enrollment	Grades	Established	Principal	Mascot	Notes
Alden Road Exceptional Student Center	155	6-12		Linda Leonard	Dolphins	School for special learning needs
Arlington Middle School	768	6-8	2000	Evan Dainels	Vikings	
Baldwin Middle-Senior High School	1,349	6-12		Denise Hall	Indians	
Eugene J. Butler Middle School				Trutie L. Moreland	Falcons	
Chaffee Trail Middle School		6-8	2024	Dr.Cicely Tyson-White	Mustangs	
Darnell-Cookman School of the Medical Arts	1,130	6-12		Tyrus Lyles	Vikings	
Charger Academy	884	6-8		Marshuana Bush	Chargers	
Alfred I. duPont Middle School	702	6-8		Marilyn Barnwell	Dragons	Formerly known as duPont Jr.-Sr. High School
Duncan U. Fletcher Middle School	1,172	6-8		Teresa Mowbray		
John E. Ford K-8 School	627	K-8		Tina Bennett	Royal Knights	
Fort Caroline Middle School	468	6-8		Chelvert Wellington	Cavaliers	
Matthew Gilbert Middle School	728	6-8		Jamelle Wilcox-Goodwin	Panthers	Served as a high school for black students before integration.
Highlands Middle School	685	6-8		Jackie Simmons	Wildcats	
James Weldon Johnson Middle School	999	6-8		Sharwonda Peek	Trojans	Magnet college preparatory; Best Practice School
Kernan Middle School	1,175	6-8		Kathy Kassees	Osprey	
Springfield Middle School	874	6-8	1923	Kenya Griffin	Comets	
Lake Shore Middle School	995	6-8		Caleb Gottberg	Warriors	
Landmark Middle School	1,075	6-8	1989	Michael Henry	Seahawks	
Julia Landon College Preparatory and Leadership Development School	858	6-8		Katrina Bledsoe	Lions	
LaVilla School of the Arts	958	6-8		Janelle Wagoner	N/A	
Mandarin Middle School	1,192	6-8		Joy Recla	Hawks	
Mayport Middle School	790	6-8	1977	Aaron Lakatos	Sharks	
Mt. Herman Exceptional Student Center	105	Ages 3–22		Mark Cashen	Herons	School for profoundly mentally handicapped students.
Northwestern Middle School				Shawn Platts	Yellow Jackets	
Oceanway School	1,041	6-8	1938	Elizabeth Stansel	Buccaneers	
Palm Avenue Exceptional Student Center	183	6-12		Michael Alexander	Panthers	School for special learning needs
Jean Ribault Middle School	687	6-8		Angela Maxey	Colts	
Mattie V. Rutherford Alternative Education Center	57	4-8		Maurice Nesmith	Wildcats	School for behaviorally and academically challenged students
Southside Middle School	851	6-8	1964	LaTanya McNeal	Knights	
Joseph Stilwell Middle School	576	6-8		Vincen	Patriots	
Westside Middle School	594	6-8		Gregory D. Bostic	Raiders	Formerly Nathan B. Forrest High School
Twin Lakes Academy Middle School	1,155	6-8		Aurelia Williams	Timberwolves	
Westview K-8 School	1,313	K-8		Michele Floyd Hatcher	Broncos	
Young Men's and Women's Leadership Academy	333	6-8	2015	Tamara Feagins	Falcons	

== Alternative schools ==
- Bridge To Success Academy (Grades 4-12)
- Mattie V. Rutherford Alternative Education Center (Grades 4-8)
- GRASP Academy (Grades 1-8)

== Elementary schools ==
- Abess Park Elementary School
- Alimacani Elementary School
- Anchor Academy Elementary School
- Andrew A. Robinson Elementary School
- Arlington Elementary School
- Arlington Heights Elementary School
- Atlantic Beach Elementary School
- Bartram Springs Elementary School
- Bayview Elementary School
- Beauclerc Elementary School
- Biltmore Elementary School
- Biscayne Elementary School
- Brookview Elementary School
- Cedar Hills Elementary School
- Central Riverside Elementary School
- Chaffee Trail Elementary School
- Chets Creek Elementary School
- Chimney Lakes Elementary School
- Crown Point Elementary School
- Crystal Springs Elementary School
- Dinsmore Elementary School
- Don Brewer Elementary School
- Englewood Elementary School
- Enterprise Learning Academy
- Fishweir Elementary School
- Fort Caroline Elementary School
- Garden City Elementary School
- George W. Carver Elementary School
- Greenfield Elementary School
- Greenland Pines Elementary School
- Gregory Drive Elementary School
- Hendricks Avenue Elementary School
- Hidden Oaks Elementary School
- Highlands Estates Academy
- Hogan-Spring Glenn Elementary School
- Holiday Hill Elementary School
- Hyde Grove Elementary School
- Hyde Park Elementary School
- J Allen Axson Elementary School
- Jacksonville Beach Elementary School
- Jacksonville Heights Elementary School
- John Love Early Learning Center(Pre-K)
- John N. C. Stockton Elementary School
- Kernan Trail Elementary School
- Lake Lucina Elementary School
- Lone Star Elementary School
- Long Branch Elementary School
- Loretto Elementary School
- Louis Sheffield Elementary School
- Love Grove Elementary School
- Mamie Agnes James Elementary School
- Mandarin Oaks Elementary School
- Mayport Elementary School
- Merrill Road Elementary School
- Neptune Beach Elementary School
- New Berlin Elementary School
- Normandy Village Elementary School
- North Shore Elementary School
- Northwestern Legends Elementary School
- Oak Hill Academy
- Oceanway Elementary School
- Ortega Elementary School
- Parkwood Heights Elementary School
- Pickett Elementary School
- Pine Estates Elementary School
- Pine Forest Elementary School
- Pinedale Elementary School
- Ramona Boulevard Elementary School
- Reynolds Lane Elementary School
- Richard L. Brown Elementary School
- Rufus E. Payne Elementary School
- Ruth N. Upson Elementary School
- Rutledge H. Pearson Elementary School
- Sabal Palm Elementary School
- Sadie T. Tillis Elementary School
- Sallye B. Mathis Elementary School
- Samuel A. Hull Elementary School
- San Jose Elementary School
- San Mateo Elementary School
- San Pablo Elementary School
- Seabreeze Elementary School
- Southside Estates Elementary School
- S. P. Livingston Elementary School
- Spring Park Elementary School
- Thomas Jefferson Elementary School
- Timucuan Elementary School
- Twin Lakes Academy
- Venetia Elementary School
- WaterleafWest Riverside Elementary School
- Whitehouse Elementary School
- Woodland Acres Elementary School
