= Urban Teacher Residency =

Teacher training program

Urban Teacher Residency (UTR) is a teacher-training program targeting specific high-needs school districts in urban areas. Reminiscent of medical residency models, UTR combines academic coursework with experiential learning under a teacher mentor. UTR programs work with partner universities and area school districts, giving aspiring teachers an opportunity to earn a master's degree while gaining first-hand teaching experience in a public school under the supervision of a veteran teacher. Models differ slightly between programs because they are specialized for the areas they serve. Teachers agree to serve at least three years in the classroom after they complete this residency.

== Mission ==
The UTR framework focuses on the best ways to recruit, prepare, and retain teachers for specific school districts. This relatively new approach to teacher training is a substitute for traditional teacher education curricula, while differing from the alternative teacher certification programs that have become popular throughout the past two decades. Thomas Payzant, former superintendent of Boston Public Schools (BPS), established Boston Teacher Residency, one of the earliest UTR programs, in 2003. Payzant aimed to resolve specific teaching issues within BPS by increasing teacher diversity, addressing teacher shortages in specific subject areas like science and math, and retaining teachers beyond three years in the classroom, as teacher turnover rates are typically high after this time span, especially in high-poverty schools. Lack of diversity, subject-teacher shortage, and teacher attrition remain the most important problems the UTR model seeks to address.

== Structure ==
Eventually, early residency programs in Boston, Denver, and Chicago joined forces with Urban Teacher Residency United (UTRU), a non-profit organization established in 2007 to support a network of residency programs across the United States. UTRU has developed a universal set of standards encouraging best practices for programs within its network. These standards specify a highly selective recruitment process for both residents and mentors, while outlining the residency curriculum and guidelines for post-residency development. Under the UTRU model, residents train as part of a group, creating a collaborative learning community. The residency lasts about a year, during which time residents remain in the classroom with their mentors, gradually moving from an observational role to a lead teaching role. Aspiring teachers also complete master's level coursework, and are typically evaluated through course grades, performance-based assessments, and projects based on a combination of research and experience in the classroom. Programs also extend development beyond the residency year, guiding these new teachers into jobs while providing continuing post-residency support in an effort to retain this teaching-force.

== Implementation ==
As each UTR caters to a specific district, they are able to train personnel with specific needs in mind. For example, the Philadelphia Teacher Residency program targets only science, technology, engineering, and math, while the Memphis Teacher Residency program recruits teachers for both the sciences and the humanities.

UTRU has 13 network partners across the country including:

- Academy for Urban School Leadership (Chicago Teacher Residency)
- Boston Teacher Residency
- Philadelphia Teacher Residency
- Richmond Teacher Residency
- Aspire Teacher Residency (California)
- Denver Teacher Residency
- Seattle Teacher Residency
- Indianapolis Urban Teacher Residency
- Memphis Teacher Residency
- Los Angeles Urban Teacher Residency
