= Corky Rogers =

American football player and coach (1943–2020)

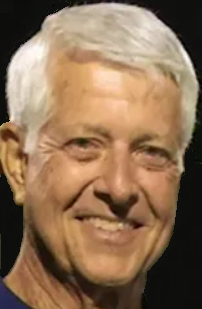

Biographical details
- Born: December 19, 1943; Bay City, Michigan, U.S.
- Died: February 27, 2020 (aged 76)

Playing career
- 1962–1965: Georgia Tech
- Positions: Quarterback, defensive back, wide receiver

Coaching career (HC unless noted)
- 1969–1971: Jean Ribault HS (FL) (assistant)
- 1972–1988: Robert E. Lee HS (FL)
- 1989–2016: Bolles School (FL)

Head coaching record
- Overall: 465–84–1

Accomplishments and honors

Championships
- 10 Florida state (1990, 1993, 1995, 1998, 2002, 2004, 2006, 2008, 2009, 2011)

Awards
- 2002 inducted into Florida Athletic Coaches Association Hall of Fame; 2004-5 National High School Coach of the Year; 2005 inducted into Florida High School Athletic Association Hall of Fame; 2007 Named coach of FHSAA All-Century Team; 2011 Most wins & state titles in Florida history 2012 inducted into Gator Bowl Hall of Fame; 2013 inducted into Florida Sports Hall of Fame

Charles Buxton "Corky" Rogers IV (December 19, 1943 – February 26, 2020) was an American football coach called "Florida’s best high school football coach" by Sports Illustrated. He served as the head football coach at two high schools in Jacksonville, Florida, Robert E. Lee High School from 1972 to 1988 and the Bolles School from 1989 to 2016.

== Youth ==
Rogers was born in Bay City, Michigan, where his father was stationed in 1943, but the family soon returned to Florida. His nickname "Corky" came from his father, Chuck, who read about World War II hero Colin Kelly from Madison, Florida, who called his own son Corky. Chuck worked 20 years as a correspondent for Associated Press before beginning a career with the City of Jacksonville in the Recreation Department.

There was a strong father-son tradition in the Rogers family. Chuck was a member of Robert E. Lee High School's first graduating class and played football there. Corky also graduated from Lee High School in 1961 where he was a three-sport athlete, playing for the Generals' 1960 unofficial state championship football team, the 1961 baseball state championship team and the basketball team. Chuck was football captain in his senior year at the University of Florida and Corky wanted to do likewise. Florida was not interested in Corky, so he enrolled at the Florida Military Academy prep school and spent a year under coaching icon Willard "Dub" Palmer. Georgia Tech Coach Bobby Dodd offered Rogers a scholarship, so he became a Yellow Jacket. Rogers was a quarterback on the Tech freshman team, a varsity defensive back for two seasons, then a wide receiver for his senior year in 1965. Coach Dodd made a big impression on the young Rogers and he told this story at an interview:

"Years later, (Coach Dodd) was down here for an alumni reception at a hotel out at the beach. My wife and I went out to see him. He was on the balcony where this elderly woman was serving boiled shrimp. Coach Dodd said, 'Y'know, if you tell that lady her hair looks nice, you're not going to run out of boiled shrimp all night, and what've you done? Something honest, fair and nice. Do that and people are going to want to do something nice for you.'
That's the best coaching lesson I ever got."

Rogers was drafted by the Baltimore Colts in 1966, but his college deferral had expired, so he was required to serve a year of active military duty in the Army Reserve. He was back in Baltimore the next season, but with receivers like Raymond Berry, Jimmy Orr and John Mackey on the roster, Rogers did not make the final cut. He began playing semi-pro football in Atlanta while taking classes to finish his college requirements. He married a flight attendant named Linda in 1968. After receiving a degree in Industrial Management from Georgia Tech, he returned with his wife to Jacksonville. The couple had two daughters, Tracy and Jennifer. Both are now married and there are several grandchildren. Rogers sold insurance for a short time until he was offered a job as an assistant football coach at Jean Ribault High School and teaching at Ribault Junior High.

== Lee ==
Rogers spent three years as an assistant at Ribault before taking the head coaching position at his alma mater, Lee High School, in 1972. He recorded 10 straight district titles from 1977 to 1986 and coached future Green Bay Packers Edgar Bennett and LeRoy Butler, who went on to become a four-time All-Pro safety. Rogers won his 100th game in 1984, but the goal that eluded him at Lee was a state championship, and it still bothered him:

"It certainly is one of the real disappointments in my career. We had the players to do it. We just didn't get it done and I'm the one that must answer for that. But I do think it was a growing period in my life where I learned what it takes. And maybe not winning one kept me that much more hungry when we came over to Bolles."

Lee's record in 1987 was 6–4, which ended a string of 10 consecutive district titles. A hit and run by a drunk driver left Rogers with a shattered left leg in March, 1988. He spent two months in St. Lukes Hospital, followed by almost a year on crutches and 18 surgeries over the years to correct the injury. At the time, Frank Callihan was Bolles' Athletic Director. While Rogers was hospitalized, Callihan made several visits and privately expressed his desire for Rogers to coach at Bolles. Rogers began to think about his future at Lee. The team's 1988 season improved to 8–2, while Bolles went 5-5, and the Bolles Athletic Director was ready to make a coaching change.

In 1989, Rogers decided to leave Lee High School after 17 successful seasons and a record of 141–39–1. He accepted the head football coach position at the Bolles School, a private school of the affluent (high school tuition in 2013 was $21,200) which was traditionally viewed with envy or as the enemy by the public-school system. Rogers kept his long-time assistant, Wayne Belger.

== Bolles ==
Rogers took over the football program at Bolles, a well-financed private school with both a strong academic and athletic reputation. In 2005, Sports Illustrated ranked it as the 9th-best high school athletics program in the country. The campus looks like a small college and contains sports facilities that many colleges would envy.

Rogers and his coaching staff began a year-round strength building program using weight training. All team members understand the importance and are committed to this requirement. Callihan commented:

"The first day Corky was introduced to the players in the weight room, he got down and bench-pressed more weight than any of them did. Wayne Belger did the same thing. That got the kids' attention. They won't tolerate the players not fulfilling their weight-room obligations."

The following year, Rogers was invited to coach the South team in the 1990 North-South All-Star Football Classic, the predecessor of the U.S. Army All-American Bowl. Since their arrival, Rogers and his coaching staff have transformed a good program into a great one. In 1994, his fourth year at Bolles, Rogers notched his 200th career win. The wing-T offense helped the Bulldogs win ten state championships and four runner-up finishes that span three school size classifications. The 300th win came in 2002, the same year he was named Sunshine Network Coach of the Year and FACA-Dairy Farmers Football Coach of the Year, and he was nominated for NFL High School Coach of the Year. Rogers' success has catapulted him to the top of the list of Florida's winningest high school football coaches. He took over the top spot with his 314th win in September 2004. Notably, among the Florida high school coaches with more than 300 wins, Rogers was the only coach with fewer than 100 losses. Public schools are generally limited to students living within the school district boundaries. Private schools can enroll students regardless of where they live. A common misconception about Bolles is that they recruit and their teams are composed of blue-chip college prospects. They usually are not, so Rogers had to maximize the potential of players with no chance of ever playing college ball. Rogers stated, "As coaches, we don't do a lot to make Division I football players; they pretty much make themselves. Where we come in is to have more influence on the guy who struggles just to be competitive." Rogers taught the character-building skills necessary to be successful in football, and more importantly, life. A stable coaching staff is beneficial, too. As of 2004, only three coaching assistants had left the Bolles program during Rogers' leadership; two of those have since returned. In 25 years at Bolles, his record was 244–33.

Prior to the 2005 season, Bolles was named as one of the "top 25 teams to watch in the nation" by Street & Smith's. Rogers was named USA Head Coach for NFL Global Junior Championships IX, and he received the Life Membership Award from the American Coaching Association "for outstanding contributions to high school athletics and the coaching profession". Bolles won their record ninth state championship in 2008, and 10th state championship the following year. After recording his 400th win early in the 2011 season, Rogers joined an exclusive group of eight coaches. At the end of the 2012 season, he was tied for 3rd place in most wins with G. A. Moore in Texas, who retired in 2011 with a record of 423–97–9. In second place is John T. Curtis, Jr. of Louisiana, who became the second coach to pass the 500-win milestone. Curtis's record going into the 2013 season was 520–54–6. The all-time leader is from South Carolina; Summerville High School's John McKissick is still active at 86, and his record is 601–148–13 after 61 seasons.

In 2013, his forty-second year of coaching, he led the Bolles School of Jacksonville, Florida to a 10–4 record, and they were runners-up in the class 4A state football championship. Three of the losses in 2013 were against teams that won a state championship. Rogers' career record at the end of 2013 was 433-77-1, including ten state championships, both state coaching records. The Florida Times-Union called Bolles-Rogers "one of the great dynasties in Florida prep football history".

== Corky Rogers Day ==
On December 18, 2005, during halftime of the Jacksonville Jaguars 10–9 victory over the San Francisco 49ers, Rogers received a silver tray celebrating his accomplishments and the honor of being the 2004-05 National High School Coach of the Year. A video of highlights in the coach's 34-year career was played on the stadium JumboTrons. Over 300 current and former players took the field during the presentation. Players from every team coached by Rogers participated. Some had not seen Rogers since their high school graduation. The reunion continued after the ceremony ended, with pictures and interaction between the coach and players. J.D. Hall, head football coach at Mandarin High School commented, "Corky is more than a just a football coach. He was a father figure to me."

== All Century Team ==
Bolles' Corky Rogers was named to the Florida High School Athletic Association's All-Century Team Coaching Staff. As part of its ongoing celebration of "100 Years of Florida High School Football," the FHSAA announced a 33-player and 12-member coaching staff for the All-Century Team. The FHSAA honored the All-Century Team players and coaches at halftime of the Class 5A state championship game in Orlando on December 14, 2007.

== Health ==
Following the 2011 season, the 68 year old Rogers was scheduled for shoulder replacement surgery. Prior to the operation, he had an electrocardiogram, which showed seven blocked arteries. He was immediately transported to the hospital by ambulance and the next day he had a septuple bypass. The cardiothoracic specialist who performed the procedure was a Bolles alumnae. Rogers took off two months for recovery and rehabilitation, but returned to school in late March and was back on the field in time for spring practice of the 2012 season.

When asked how long he planned to continue coaching, Rogers said, "You just don't know how you're going to feel from one year to the next". Coach Rogers will continue to coach until activities like fishing and golfing become more important or his health becomes an issue. After his heart surgery, he stated that if he cannot give 100% and do the job that the kids deserve, he will step down.

He became ill while on vacation during the summer of 2016 but returned to lead his team to a near-perfect season, losing in the state championship game. In March 2017 he retired due to declining health and began a personal fight against cancer. Less than three years later, the disease had spread to multiple organs and he died at age 76.

== Notable players coached ==
- Edgar Bennett, running back for the Green Bay Packers and the Chicago Bears
- Leroy Butler, strong safety for the Green Bay Packers
- Riley Skinner, quarterback for the Wake Forest Demon Deacons and, briefly, the New York Giants
- Jason Spitz, offensive guard for the Green Bay Packers and the Jacksonville Jaguars
- Dez White, wide receiver for the Chicago Bears and the Atlanta Falcons
- Hayden Hurst, tight end for the Cincinnati Bengals
- Mac Jones, quarterback for the New England Patriots and the Jacksonville Jaguars
