= Atlantic Coast High School =

Public high school in Jacksonville, Florida, United States

Location
- 9735 Stingray Parkway; Jacksonville, Florida 32256; United States; 30°12′8.00″N 81°30′21.00″W

Information
- Type: Public high school
- Established: 2010; 16 years ago
- Status: Open
- School district: Duval County School District
- Superintendent: Diana Greene
- School number: 268
- Principal: Marleny Chirino
- Staff: 118.00 (FTE)
- Grades: 9–12
- Enrollment: 2,768 (2023-2024)
- Student to teacher ratio: 23.46
- Hours in school day: 7:10 a.m. - 2:05 p.m.
- Campus size: 161 acres (0.65 km^{2})
- Campus type: Suburban
- Colours: Burnt orange, black, and white
- Slogan: "Making waves towards greatness"
- Mascot: Stingrays
- Website: dcps.duvalschools.org/achs

Atlantic Coast High School (ACHS) is a public high school in the Duval County Public Schools district, located in southeast Jacksonville, Florida, United States.

Its boundary includes the Duval County portion of the Nocatee development (which is not in the Nocatee census-designated place).

== Overview ==
Construction of the 302,000 square-meters building was completed during the spring of 2010 at a cost of nearly $78 million. The school was constructed to prevent overcrowding at Sandalwood High School, Englewood High School, Wolfson High School and Mandarin High School. Sandalwood is the largest high school in Duval County, followed by Mandarin High School. The main feeder schools are Kernan Middle School and Twin Lakes Academy.

The school graduated their first senior class in 2013. Atlantic Coast High School has a capacity of 2,300 students. The two-story school complex has an open courtyard between wings. The complex is divided into buildings, then further organized into 'pods', which holds the classrooms.

The gymnasium seats 1,621 and the auditorium's capacity is 840. The media center (library) has a television studio. The school mascot is the stingray, and their colors are burnt orange, black, and white.

== Academics ==
In addition to the standard high school curriculum and exceptional student education, the advanced scholars program gives students the option to participate in the rigorous programs of advanced placement, dual enrollment and honors courses, but not the Advanced International Certificate of Education or International Baccalaureate, which are available at several other Jacksonville schools such as, Jean Ribault High School, Stanton College Preparatory School, Mandarin High School, or Paxon School for Advanced Studies.

== Academies ==
Their curriculum offers an AP Honors academy program as well as an AP Capstone program. They also have a Career Academy program in the area of Information technology with concentration in Web Design, Commercial Arts and Television Production.

== Evacuation center ==
The school is designated as a Hurricane Evacuation center and a backup generator can provide electricity during power outages for individuals with "special needs".

== Notable alumni ==
- Pat Bryant, college football wide receiver for the Illinois Fighting Illini

== Notable faculty ==
- Joel Davis, former Major League Baseball pitcher, played professionally for the Chicago White Sox, coach at Atlantic Coast High School
