= Educators of Change =

Teacher-development program

Educators of Change is an alternative certification teacher-development program instituted in 2007 by Duval County Public Schools in Jacksonville, Florida.

== Purpose ==
Educators of Change was established to build a cohort of public school teachers consisting of professionals and other individuals who had achieved success outside of the education field. Currently in its second enrollment cycle, the program has attracted individuals from financial, business, communications, and non-profit areas. The program requires a Bachelor's degree and a subject-specific test of its applicants, and those who are selected are placed into an intensive preparatory program.

Individuals who join the program are either changing careers or returning to the workforce, including retirees. In addition to business experience gained from current or former jobs, candidates may exhibit a volunteer-based leadership background.

== Background ==
The program is one of many across American public school districts that have been enacted to improve the quality of students' education experience. For example, the New York City Teaching Fellows program, which encourages mature professionals to enter teaching, is credited with helping to narrow the teacher-qualification gap between poor and well-to-do schools from 2000 to 2005 as documented in a 2008 study by the nonpartisan National Bureau of Economic Research.
