= A. Philip Randolph Academies of Technology =

Coordinates: 30.367865°N 81.676915°W

- Jacksonville, Florida; United States

Information
- Other name: Randolph or APR
- Type: Magnet School
- Established: 1977
- Principal: Robert Lewis
- Teaching staff: 20.00 (FTE)
- Grades: 8–12
- Enrollment: 341 (2023–2024)
- Student to teacher ratio: 17.05
- Campus: Urban
- Colors: Green & Gold
- Mascot: Jaguars
- Website: www.duvalschools.org/aprtech

A. Philip Randolph Academies of Technology, also known as Randolph Skill Center High School and formerly known as Northside Skills Center, is one of twelve high schools in Jacksonville, Florida (of nineteen in the Duval County Public Schools network) to offer the advanced curriculum and skills training of Duval County's MAGNET programs. It was the first of three skill centers to be built in Jacksonville for the sole purpose of teaching trades (along with Westside Skills Center and Southside Skills Center, now known as Frank H. Peterson Academies of Technology and Southside Middle School, respectively) before being converted to academic use in 1997.

== Namesake ==
The school was named in honor of A. Philip Randolph, an African-American labor movement and civil rights leader, during a standing-room-only dedication ceremony in 1980 in which Reverend Jesse Jackson was the keynote speaker. While his namesake was included in the full name of the school, it was not common to refer to the school by his name (but instead "Northside Skills Center") until its reappropriation.

== Academic programs ==
=== Information technology (computer science) ===
The highest level of the building in the center is focused for this particular subject. The list included web design, presentation, along with programming and maintenance of computer systems to name a few.

=== Construction ===
Students get hands on experience with tools and they are taught how to practice safety and are taught to saw, nail, soft and hard soldering, arc welding etc. The can get their 10-hour online osha certificate which the student can go to on a job site show the construction manager and start working. They can also earn various other certificates from passing different tests that they take after reading chapters in the construction textbooks.

=== Brick masonry ===
Students get hands-on experience with tools and are taught safety with on-the-job training. They will learn the history behind how clay and shale brick is made and how its importance of the learning how graph plans. Also taught to make concrete mortar used in all Brick and block buildings, also to be an artist to create their own designs (draw plans) to construct their own brick projects and in three years of training, one would receive an apprentice brick masonry degree and also will have a trade that will always have use in the world.

=== Fire and Rescue ===
APR has partnered with the Jacksonville Fire and Rescue Department, to create the Fire and Rescue Career Academy. Students are prepared for a career in firefighting and/or Emergency Medical Services (EMS). Students can earn CPR Certification, First Responders Certification, Emergency Medical Technician Certification (EMT), Firefighter 1 Certification and college credits. This class is run by Mr. Alonza Bronner; who was the second African American firefighter in Jacksonville Florida.

=== Other programs ===
Many of the programs that were once featured at APR (or NSS before it, programs including automotive and communications) were disassembled and re-established at Frank H. Peterson Academies of Technology, what most consider to be APR's "brother school" in Jacksonville.

== Extracurricular activities ==
There are no sports activities at A. Philip Randolph, but there are extracurricular activities such as: Anime Club, Bible Study, Gentlemen of Randolph, Ladies of Randolph and a High School National Honours Society Scholarship Scheduled Meetings, and Student Council.

HOSA for the health academy

BPA for IT

== Advanced-placement curriculum ==
The school currently offers 11 Advanced Placement courses
