= Edgar Bennett =

American football player and coach (born 1969)

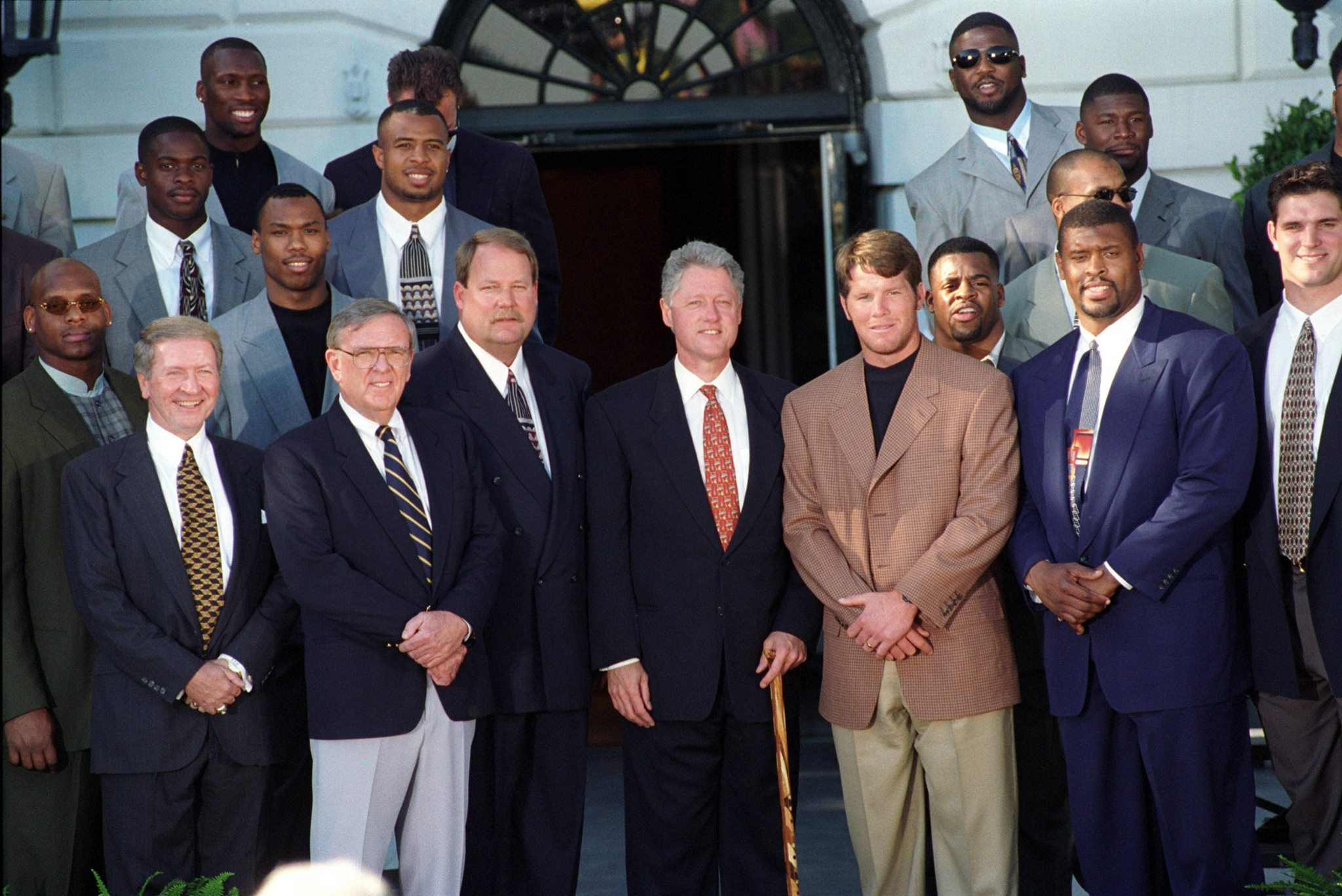
- Bennett in 1997

Jacksonville Jaguars
- Title: Wide receivers coach

Personal information
- Born: February 15, 1969 (age 57); Jacksonville, Florida, U.S.
- Listed height: 6 ft 0 in (1.83 m)
- Listed weight: 218 lb (99 kg)

Career information
- Position: Running back (No. 34, 32)
- High school: Lee (Jacksonville, Florida)
- College: Florida State
- NFL draft: 1992: 4th round, 103rd overall pick

Career history

Playing
- Green Bay Packers (1992–1997); Chicago Bears (1998–1999)

Coaching
- Green Bay Packers (2005–2010) Running backs coach; Green Bay Packers (2011–2014) Wide receivers coach; Green Bay Packers (2015–2017) Offensive coordinator; Oakland / Las Vegas Raiders (2018–2024) Wide receivers coach; Jacksonville Jaguars (2025–present) Wide receivers coach

Awards and highlights
- As player: Super Bowl champion (XXXI); Green Bay Packers Hall of Fame; Florida State Athletic Hall of Fame; Second Team All-South Independent(1990, 1991); As coach: Super Bowl champion (XLV)

Career NFL statistics
- Rushing yards: 3,992
- Rushing average: 3.6
- Rushing touchdowns: 21
- Receptions: 284
- Receiving yards: 2,245
- Receiving touchdowns: 10
- Stats at Pro Football Reference
- Coaching profile at Pro Football Reference

Edgar Bennett III (born February 15, 1969) is an American football coach and former running back who is the wide receivers coach for the Jacksonville Jaguars of the National Football League (NFL). Bennett played college football for the Florida State Seminoles and was selected by the Green Bay Packers in the fourth round of the 1992 NFL draft. He also played for the Chicago Bears.

== Early life ==
Bennett attended Robert E. Lee High School in Jacksonville, Florida and won varsity letters in football, basketball, and track. Influenced by football coach Corky Rogers, he was a Class 4A All-State running back, and was a SuperPrep All-Dixie selection.

== Playing career ==
=== College ===
Bennett attended Florida State University. He lined up primarily at fullback in a backfield that included future NFL running backs Amp Lee, Marquette Smith, William Floyd, Zach Crockett and Sean Jackson. When Lee was suspended for the Cotton Bowl, Bennett started at halfback. Bennett is considered one of the most versatile fullbacks in FSU history. His career all-purpose yardage totaled more than 2,300 on 389 touches, good for 20 touchdowns. He was an all-around player who ran a 4.5 40 and caught 93 passes for over 1,000 yards.

=== National Football League ===
Pre-draft measurables
Height	Weight	Arm length	Hand span	40-yard dash	10-yard split	20-yard split	20-yard shuttle	Vertical jump
5 ft 11 3/4 in (1.82 m)	208 lb (94 kg)	31 1/2 in (0.80 m)	9 1/4 in (0.23 m)	4.75 s	1.63 s	2.71 s	4.37 s	35.5 in (0.90 m)

==== Green Bay Packers ====
Bennett was drafted in the fourth round (103rd overall) by the Packers in the 1992 NFL draft. He started his Packer career as a fullback, but he became the starting running back in 1995 and gained 1,067 yards rushing. As both a fullback and a running back, Bennett excelled as a receiver leading the Packers in receptions. He continued as the starting running back throughout the 1996 season, but in the latter half, Dorsey Levens was receiving significant playing time at running back. Bennett's career as a Packer culminated in their Super Bowl XXXI victory. He ruptured his Achilles tendon in the 1997 preseason and did not play that year. He was inducted into the Green Bay Packers Hall of Fame in 2005.

==== Chicago Bears ====
Bennett played with the Chicago Bears in 1998 and 1999 before retiring after the 1999 season.

== NFL career statistics ==
Year	Team	GP	Att	Yds	Avg	Lng	TD	Rec	Yds	Avg	Lng	TD
1992	GB	16	61	214	3.5	18	0	13	93	7.2	22	0
1993	GB	16	159	550	3.5	19	9	59	457	7.7	39	1
1994	GB	16	178	623	3.5	39	5	78	546	7.0	40	4
1995	GB	16	316	1,067	3.4	23	3	61	648	10.6	35	4
1996	GB	16	222	899	4.0	23	2	31	176	5.7	25	1
1997	GB	0	Did not play due to injury									
1998	CHI	16	173	611	3.5	43	2	28	209	7.5	31	0
1999	CHI	16	6	28	4.7	15	0	14	116	8.3	34	0
Career		112	1,115	3,992	3.6	43	21	284	2,245	7.9	40	10

== Coaching career ==
=== Green Bay Packers ===
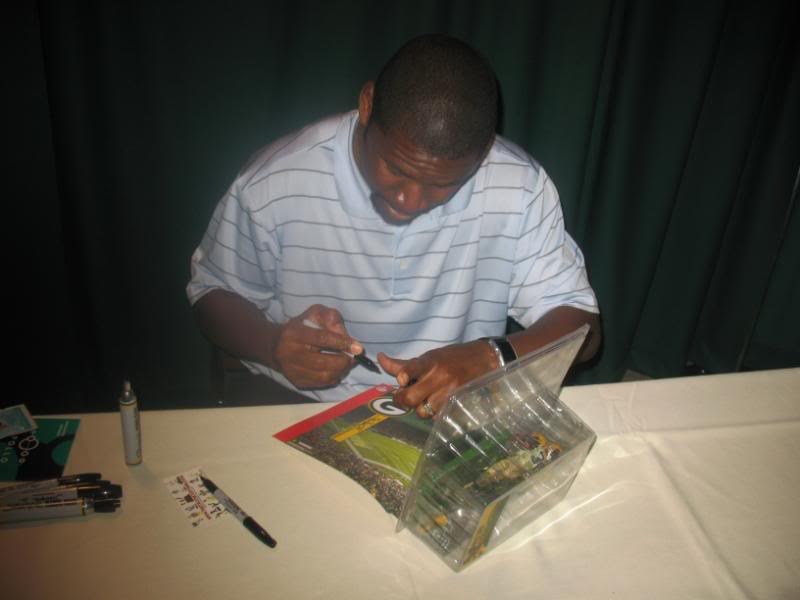
Bennett signing autographs in 2008

Bennett rejoined the Packer organization in 2001 as director of player development. He later served as running backs coach for six seasons. In February 2011, Bennett was named wide receivers coach. In February 2015, Packers head coach Mike McCarthy promoted Bennett to offensive coordinator.

=== Oakland / Las Vegas Raiders ===
On January 13, 2018, Bennett was hired by the Oakland Raiders as their wide receivers coach under head coach Jon Gruden. On February 2, 2022, the team announced it would retain Bennett under new head coach Josh McDaniels. On February 4, 2025, Bennett was dismissed by the Raiders.

=== Jacksonville Jaguars ===
On February 7, 2025, the Jacksonville Jaguars hired Bennett to serve as their wide receivers coach.

== Personal life ==
Edgar's daughter Elyse Bennett was the seventh overall pick in the 2022 NWSL Draft to KC Current.
