= James F. Rinehart =

American academic

James Forrest Rinehart (December 1, 1950 – May 10, 2015) was a professor of International Relations at Troy University. In addition, since 2012, he has served as Dean of the College of Arts & Sciences. Previously, Rinehart was Associate Dean (2008–11), and Chair of the Department of Political Science (2001–08).

Rinehart was born in Kansas City, Missouri. In 1951, his family relocated to Jacksonville, Florida. He is a 1968 graduate of Jean Ribault High School and holds a BA in Economics from the University of Florida, where he was inducted into Florida Blue Key Honor Fraternity.

He received his Ph.D. in International Relations from the Maxwell School of Citizenship and Public Affairs at Syracuse University where he studied with Michael Barkun and Louis Kriesberg. His research focuses on the functional role of religious and secular millenarianism in the onset and process of political violence, particularly revolution and terrorism. He is the author of two books: Revolution and the Millennium: China, Mexico, and Iran (Westport, CT: Praeger, 1997) and, Apocalyptic Faith and Political Violence: Prophets of Terror (New York: Palgrave Macmillan, 2006; Updated and Expanded Edition, 2010) as well as several articles and academic conference papers on the subjects of religion and international politics, revolution, terrorism, American foreign policy, and international law. He has been interviewed frequently by the media on these topics and has lectured in a variety of venues, both academic and military.

Previously, Dr. Rinehart was professor and academic director of the Graduate Program in International Relations at the United States Army John F. Kennedy Special Warfare Center and School (USAJFKSWCS), Ft. Bragg, North Carolina. In 1998, he participated in and was a teaching consultant in the Army After Next war game at the US Army War College and has been a consultant to the US Department of Homeland Security. In 2010, Rinehart was designated by the Secretary of the Army as an honorary member of the US Army Civil Affairs and Psychological Operations Regiment in recognition of his contributions to the CA and PSYOP community.

In the 1970s and 80s, Rinehart worked in the international OTC pharmaceutical and health care sector. During this time he held management and executive positions with Johnson & Johnson, Schering Laboratories (division of Merck & Co.), and most recently was a vice president of Chattem Laboratories (subsidiary of Sanofi US).

Rinehart died on May 10, 2015, at a hospital in Montgomery, Alabama.
