= Darnell-Cookman School of the Medical Arts =

Secondary school in Jacksonville, Florida

Location
- 1701 N Davis St; Jacksonville, Duval County, Florida 32209-6518; United States
- Coordinates: 30.345919°N 81.666166°W

Information
- School type: Public magnet secondary school
- Status: Open
- NCES District ID: 1200480
- School code: FL-16-1451
- NCES School ID: 120048002816
- Faculty: 53 (on an FTE basis)
- Grades: 6-12
- Enrollment: 1,003 (2022-2023)
  - Grade 6: 252
  - Grade 7: 232
  - Grade 8: 212
  - Grade 9: 93
  - Grade 10: 91
  - Grade 11: 47
  - Grade 12: 76
- Student to teacher ratio: 18.92:1
- USNWR ranking: 232
- Website: dcps.duvalschools.org/o/dchs
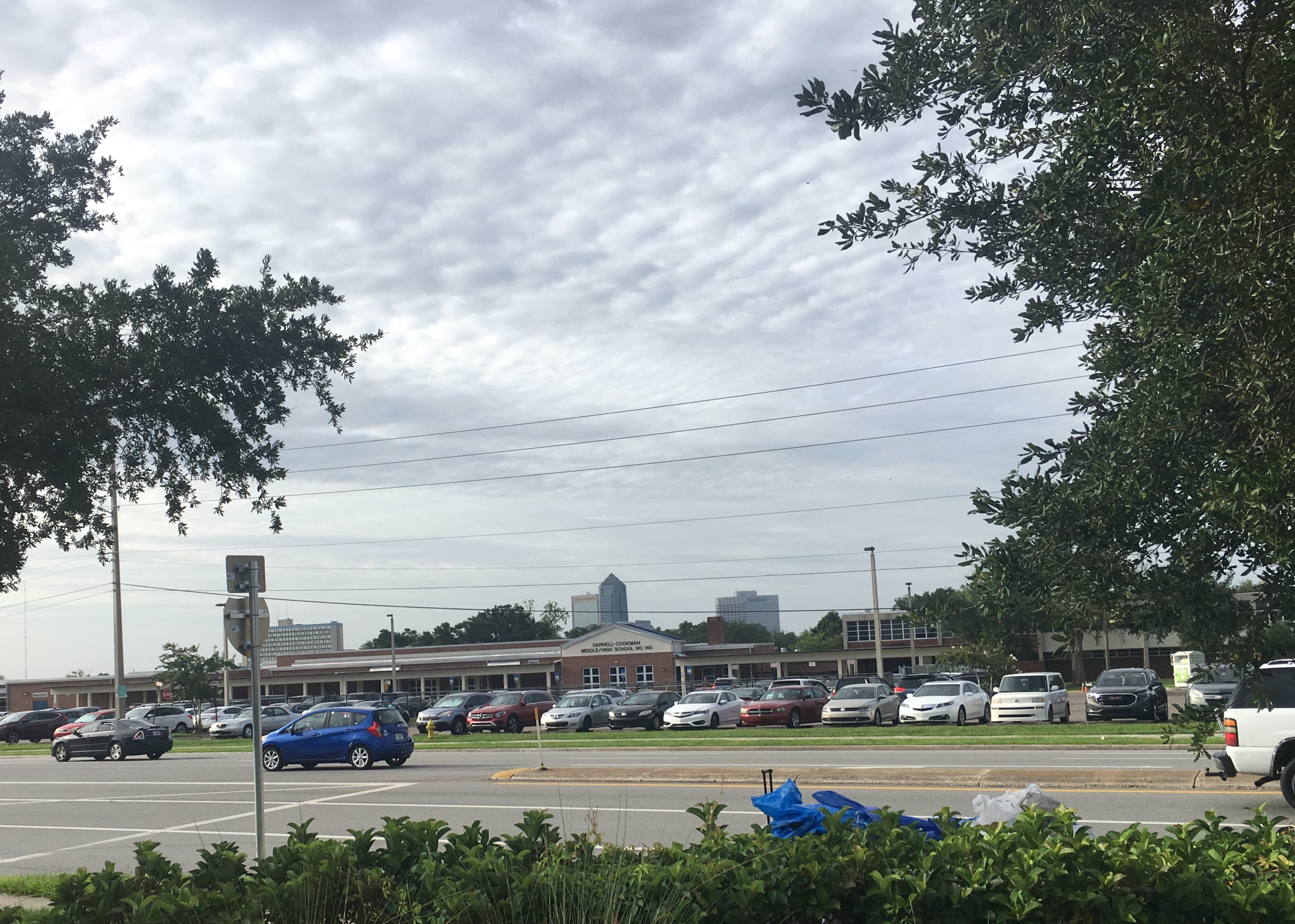
- Exterior view of school, August 2019

Darnell-Cookman School of the Medical Arts (DCSoMA) is a secondary school within the Duval County Public Schools system in Jacksonville, Florida, USA. It is a National Blue Ribbon School as recognized by the US Department of Education. It is also an "A" school in Florida's grading system. The school is across 8th Street from UF Health Shands Hospital. DCSoMA is a dedicated magnet school serving students in grades 6 through 12. The first graduating class received its diplomas in the spring of 2012. Admission to the school is through a magnet lottery system administered by the Duval County Public Schools.

== History ==
Samuel B. Darnell was a Methodist minister who moved to Jacksonville to serve as pastor of Ebenezer Methodist-Episcopal Church. In the late 1800s, he founded the Cookman Institute, which was located at Beaver and Hogan Streets. It was the first institution of higher education for African-Americans in the state of Florida specializing in the religious and academic preparation of teachers. Under the leadership of Darnell, the school served thousands of young black men and women until it was destroyed in the Great Jacksonville Fire of 1901. The school relocated when it was rebuilt to move from the town center. Alfred Cookman, a friend of Darnell's, helped raise money to rebuild the school. After rebuilding, the enrollment was about two hundred and fifty. The Cookman Institute for Boys had classes in all the elementary and four high school grades. There were special courses in normal training, music, domestic science, public speaking, printing, business, and agriculture. In 1923, the Cookman Institute merged with the Daytona Normal and Industrial Institute, forming what would later become Bethune-Cookman College. The Duval County School System later purchased the Cookman Institute facility. Eartha White, a well-known Jacksonville activist, suggested naming the Jacksonville school to honor Darnell and Cookman. In the succeeding years, the school served as a neighborhood middle school, an alternative school, and a school for young women.

In 2022, the school had an enrollment of 1,003 students in grades 6–12 with an instructional staff of 53. The school's colors are navy blue and gold, and the school mascot is a Viking. Darnell-Cookman Middle/High School is an "A" school in the State of Florida's school grading system and a National Blue Ribbon School as designated by the USDOE.

== Curriculum ==
The school offers only advanced, gifted, honors, accelerated, and Advanced Placement courses. The middle grades (6-8) curriculum is an accelerated math and science program. Middle-graders may complete math through Geometry and Science through Biology—high school-level courses to meet the graduation requirement. All courses in the middle grades are either advanced, accelerated, or gifted. The upper grades (9-12) curriculum is an Advanced Placement Honors/Scholars program. Students take an intensive and rigorous course load each year with extra emphasis on the sciences, math, and humanities. They will take at least 8 Advanced Placement (College Board) courses and may take up to 12.

== Awards ==
In 2015, The Washington Post ranked the school the 7th "Most Challenging" high school in America.
