= Pat Bryant =

American football player (born 2002)

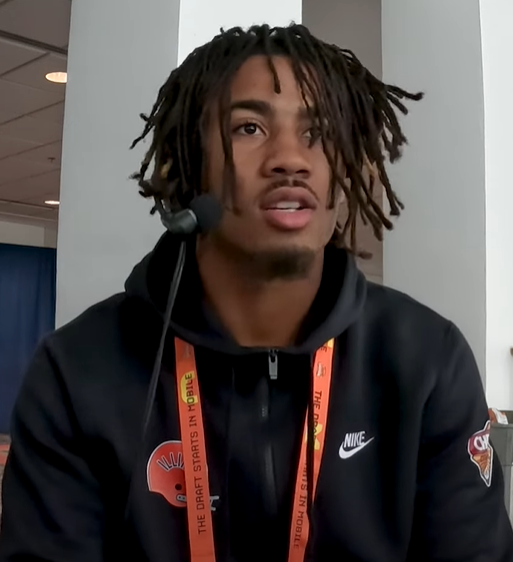
- Bryant in 2025

No. 13 – Denver Broncos
- Position: Wide receiver
- Roster status: Active

Personal information
- Born: December 10, 2002 (age 23); Jacksonville, Florida, U.S.
- Listed height: 6 ft 2 in (1.88 m)
- Listed weight: 204 lb (93 kg)

Career information
- High school: Atlantic Coast (Jacksonville, Florida)
- College: Illinois (2021–2024)
- NFL draft: 2025: 3rd round, 74th overall pick

Career history
- Denver Broncos (2025–present)

Awards and highlights
- Second-team All-Big Ten (2024)

Career NFL statistics as of Week 4, 2026
- Receptions: 40
- Receiving yards: 511
- Receiving touchdowns: 2
- Rushing yards: 16
- Stats at Pro Football Reference

Patrick Bryant II (born December 10, 2002) is an American professional football wide receiver for the Denver Broncos of the National Football League (NFL). He played college football for the Illinois Fighting Illini and was selected by the Broncos in the third round of the 2025 NFL draft.

== Early life ==
Bryant was born on December 10, 2002, in Jacksonville, Florida. He attended Atlantic Coast High School in Jacksonville. During his high school career, he had 128 receptions for 2,261 receiving yards and 23 touchdowns. He committed to the University of Illinois Urbana-Champaign to play college football.

== College career ==
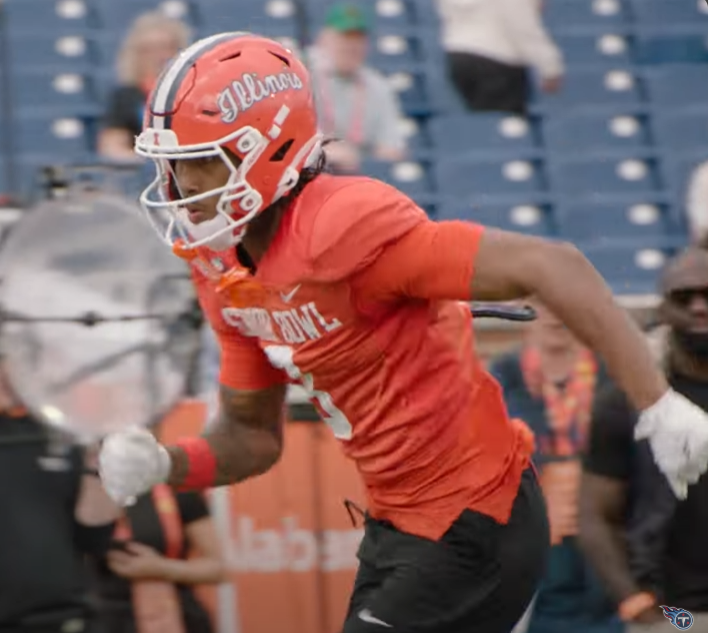
Bryant at the 2025 Senior Bowl

As a true freshman at Illinois in 2021, Bryant had six receptions for 98 yards. As a sophomore in 2022, he started 11 of 12 games and recorded 34 receptions for 453 yards and two touchdowns. As a junior in 2023, he had 43 receptions for 560 yards and seven touchdowns over 12 games and nine starts. Bryant returned to Illinois as the team's number one receiver his senior year in 2024, where he recorded 54 receptions for 984 yards and ten touchdowns over 12 games. In the game at Rutgers, Bryant had a 40-yard game-winning touchdown in the closing seconds of the game. He opted out of the Cheez-It Citrus Bowl so he could prepare for the draft.

== Professional career ==
Pre-draft measurables
Height	Weight	Arm length	Hand span	Wingspan	40-yard dash	10-yard split	20-yard split	Vertical jump	Broad jump
6 ft 2 1/4 in (1.89 m)	204 lb (93 kg)	31 1/8 in (0.79 m)	9 1/2 in (0.24 m)	6 ft 6 in (1.98 m)	4.61 s	1.56 s	2.69 s	37.5 in (0.95 m)	10 ft 4 in (3.15 m)
All values from NFL Combine

Bryant was selected by the Denver Broncos in the third round (74th overall) of the 2025 NFL draft.

To begin the season, Bryant saw a minor role in the Broncos' offense. He caught his first career reception in Week 2 against the Indianapolis Colts, and scored his first career touchdown on a back-shoulder pass from Bo Nix in Week 8 against the Dallas Cowboys.

As the season progressed, Bryant solidified himself as a regular contributor, posting 292 yards over the next seven games despite only having 86 yards during the first eight games of the season. During a Week 11 victory against the rival Kansas City Chiefs, Bryant recorded a season-high 82 yards on five receptions.

Near the end of the Broncos' Week 16 loss against the Jacksonville Jaguars, Bryant was carted off the field on a back board after taking a hit from cornerback Montaric Brown and subsequently taken to the hospital in an ambulance. It was later determined that Bryant had suffered a concussion, but escaped what was initially feared to have been a major neck injury.

For the remainder of the season, Bryant struggled to stay on the field. During the Divisional Round against the Buffalo Bills, he left the game early with another concussion, and had a similar premature exit in the AFC Championship against the New England Patriots after injuring his hamstring.

Bryant was placed on injured reserve on October 9, 2026, after suffering an ankle injury during a Week 4 game against the San Francisco 49ers. He was activated from injured reserve on November 7.

== NFL career statistics ==
Legend
**Bold**	Career high

=== Regular season ===
Year	Team	Games		Receiving						Fumbles	
Year	Team	GP	GS	Tgt	Rec	Yds	Avg	Lng	TD	Fmb	Lost
2025	DEN	15	7	49	31	378	12.2	48	1	0	0
Career		15	7	49	31	378	12.2	48	1	0	0

=== Postseason ===
Year	Team	Games		Receiving						Fumbles	
Year	Team	GP	GS	Tgt	Rec	Yds	Avg	Lng	TD	Fmb	Lost
2025	DEN	2	2	4	4	34	8.5	15	0	0	0
Career		2	2	4	4	34	8.5	15	0	0	0
