= Nigel Carr (American football) =

American football player (born 1990)

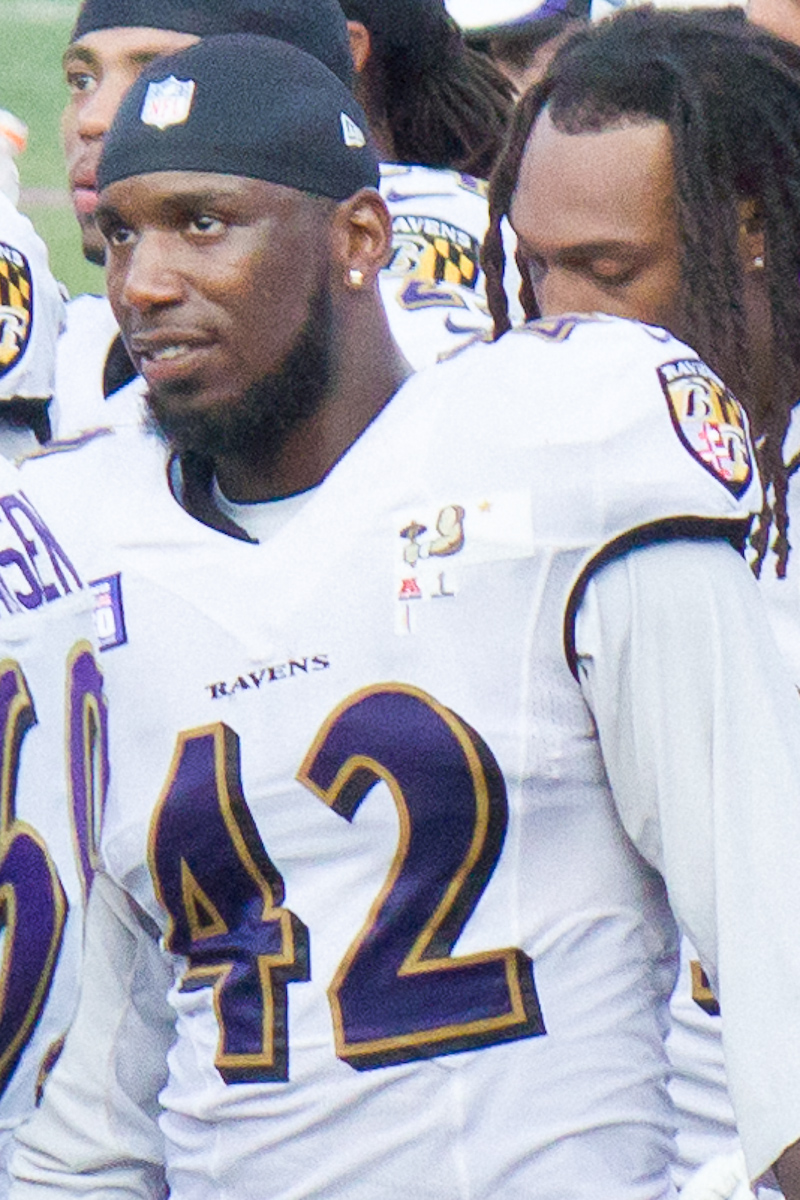
- Carr at Ravens M&T Bank Stadium practice in August 2013.

No. 42
- Position: Linebacker

Personal information
- Born: January 22, 1990 (age 36); Jacksonville, Florida, U.S.
- Listed height: 6 ft 2 in (1.88 m)
- Listed weight: 240 lb (109 kg)

Career information
- High school: Jacksonville (FL) First Coast
- College: Alabama State; Florida State
- NFL draft: 2012: undrafted

Career history
- Baltimore Ravens (2012)*
- * Offseason or practice squad member only

Awards and highlights
- Super Bowl champion (XLVII)

Nigel Carr (born January 22, 1990) is an American former football linebacker. He was a member of the Baltimore Ravens of the National Football League (NFL).

== Early life ==
A native of Jacksonville, Florida, Carr attended First Coast High School. Regarded as a four-star recruit, he was listed as the sixth-ranked inside linebacker prospect in his class.

== College career ==
Carr attended Alabama State, where he transferred from Florida State in 2010. He had been released from his scholarship after a series of felony and misdemeanor charges in August 2010.

== Professional career ==
Carr went undrafted in the 2012 NFL draft. He was subsequently signed by the Baltimore Ravens. After spending the season without a game appearance, Carr was cut by the Ravens before the 2013 NFL season.
