= Alternative teacher certification =

Alternative teacher certification is a process by which a person is awarded a teaching license even though that person has not completed a traditional teacher certification program. In the US, traditional teacher certification is earned through completing a bachelor's or master's degree in education, taking standardized tests (usually a Praxis test), and fulfilling additional state requirements. Alternatively certified teachers typically possess a bachelor's degree from an accredited college or university and are completing (or have completed) an alternative certification program while teaching full-time. Other state certification requirements, such as the type of education coursework or the length of practice teaching, may be modified or waived. In the United States, alternative certification is offered in forty-eight states and the District of Columbia.

Alternative certification programs first appeared in the 1980s. A decline in the number of students seeking a degree in education was creating a shortage of teachers in American elementary and high schools. States began to search for a way to recruit and train people who had already earned a four-year degree and wanted to become teachers. While the requirements for an alternative certification vary from state to state, there are certain commonalities found in the programs. A prospective teacher is usually required to complete an accelerated university program, pass the state licensing test, and submit to a series of interviews. The prospective teacher must be able to demonstrate a mastery of educational methods, and participate in a mentor program with a teacher who has completed a traditional education degree.

== See also ==
- Teach For America
- Academy for Urban School Leadership
- New Teacher Project
- American Board for Certification of Teacher Excellence (ABCTE)
- New York City Teaching Fellows
- Mississippi Teacher Corps
- Educators of Change
