= Willie Smith (tight end) =

American football player (born 1964)

No. 84
- Position: Tight end

Personal information
- Born: August 6, 1964 (age 62); Jacksonville, Florida, U.S.
- Listed height: 6 ft 2 in (1.88 m)
- Listed weight: 235 lb (107 kg)

Career information
- High school: Englewood (Jacksonville)
- College: Miami (FL)
- NFL draft: 1986: 10th round, 265th overall pick

Career history
- Tampa Bay Buccaneers (1987)*; Miami Dolphins (1987)
- * Offseason or practice squad member only

Awards and highlights
- National champion (1983); Consensus All-American (1985); Second-team All-American (1984)

Career NFL statistics
- Receptions: 2
- Receiving yards: 13
- Touchdowns: 1
- Stats at Pro Football Reference

Willie Smith (born August 6, 1964) is an American former professional football player who was a tight end for one season with the Miami Dolphins of the National Football League (NFL). He played college football for the Miami Hurricanes, earning consensus All-American honors in 1985. He was selected by the Cleveland Browns in the 10th round of the 1986 NFL draft.

== Early life ==
Willie Smith was born on August 6, 1964, in Jacksonville, Florida. He attended Englewood High School in Jacksonville. He earned first-team all-state honors at defensive back his junior year and second-team all-state honors at wide receiver his senior year. Smith was also named all-state in basketball and track.

== College career ==
Smith was a member of the 1983 Miami Hurricanes team that were consensus national champions. He caught 66 passes for 852 yards and five touchdowns in 1984, earning Associated Press second-team All-American honors. His 66 receptions was the most among independents that year. He recorded 48 receptions for 669 yards and one touchdown in 1985, garnering consensus All-American recognition. Smith skipped his senior year to enter the 1986 NFL draft. He was inducted into the University of Miami Sports Hall of Fame in 2023.

== Professional career ==
Smith was selected by the Cleveland Browns in the tenth round, with the 265th overall pick, of the 1986 NFL draft. On June 30, 1986, he was arrested and charged with possession of cocaine and carrying a concealed firearm. He agreed to enter into a pretrial intervention program instead of facing charges. On July 21, 1986, Smith's rights were relinquished by the Browns.

Smith signed with the Tampa Bay Buccaneers on February 19, 1987. He was released on April 20, 1987.

On September 22, 1987, Smith signed with the Miami Dolphins during the 1987 NFL players strike. He played in three games for the Dolphins during the 1987 season, catching two passes for 13 yards and one touchdown. He was released on October 19, 1987, after the strike ended.
