= Howard Smothers =

American football player (born 1973)

Profile
- Positions: Offensive lineman, defensive lineman

Personal information
- Born: November 16, 1973 (age 52)
- Listed height: 6 ft 5 in (1.96 m)
- Listed weight: 290 lb (132 kg)

Career information
- High school: Jean Ribault (Jacksonville, Florida)
- College: Bethune-Cookman
- NFL draft: 1995: 7th round, 248th overall pick

Career history
- Philadelphia Eagles (1995)*; Orlando Predators (1998); Buffalo Destroyers (1999–2001)
- * Offseason or practice squad member only

Awards and highlights
- ArenaBowl champion (1998)

Career AFL statistics
- Tackles: 8.5
- Stats at ArenaFan.com

Howard Smothers (born November 16, 1973) is an American former professional football offensive lineman who played three seasons in the Arena Football League (AFL) with the Orlando Predators and Buffalo Destroyers. He was selected by the Philadelphia Eagles in the seventh round of the 1995 NFL draft after playing college football at Bethune-Cookman.

== Early life ==
Smothers played high school football at Jean Ribault High School in Jacksonville, Florida.

== Professional career ==
Smothers was selected by the Philadelphia Eagles with the 248th pick in the 1995 NFL draft.

Smothers played for the Orlando Predators in 1998.

Smothers played for the Buffalo Destroyers from 1999 to 2000. He was released by the Destroyers on February 13, 2001.

== Personal life ==
His son, Howard Smothers, played college football at Prairie View A&M University.
