= Marine Science Education Center =

Coordinates: 30°23′38″N 81°25′41″W

Marine Science Education Center (MSEC) is a school in Atlantic Beach, Florida. It is located at 1347 Palmer Street and is part of Duval County Public Schools The school features 14 wet lab tanks, a small museum on local marine life and fishing, in a historic circa 1927 schoolhouse.

== History ==
The building that the MSEC is housed was originally built in 1927 and was known as Ribault Elementary School. It was named after French Explorer Jean Ribault who discovered the area in 1562. It provided the education for all the students in the Mayport Village area until they reached high school age when they then attended Stanton High School. The school then was closed in 1966 because of the building of Mayport Elementary. In 1968 the school was reopened and turned into the Marine Science Education Center with money from a Federal Grant. Three years later it became a part of the Duval County Public School System, where it has hosted many different programs.
