= Orr Academy High School =

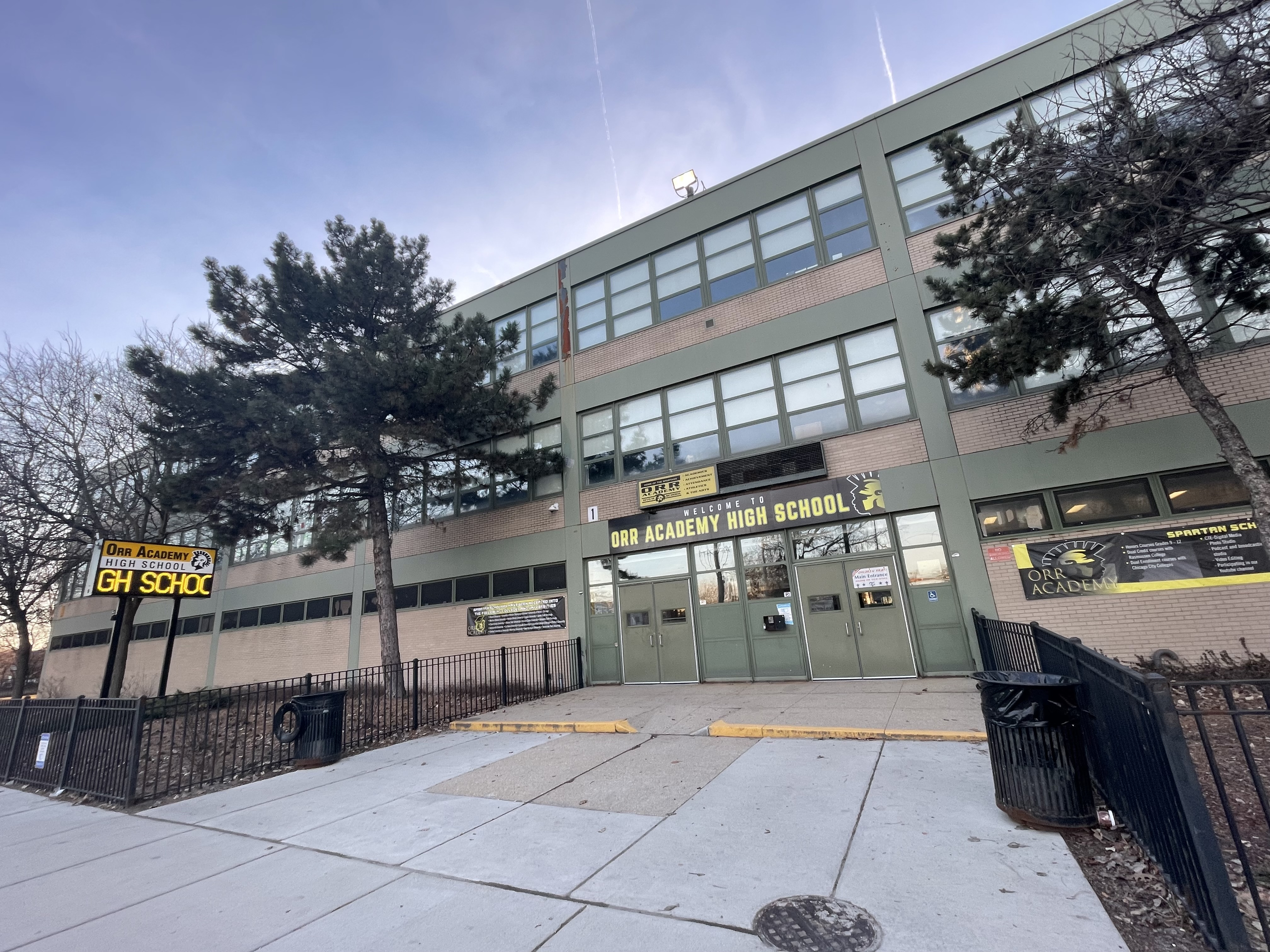

Location
- 730 N. Pulaski Road; Chicago, Illinois 60624; United States

Information
- School type: Public Secondary
- Opened: 1918; 1973 (present building)
- School district: Chicago Public Schools
- CEEB code: 140696
- Principal: Karen M. Carpenter
- Enrollment: 516 (2013–14)
- Colors: Gold; Black
- Athletics conference: Chicago Public League
- Team name: Spartans
- Accreditation: North Central Association of Colleges and Schools
- Website: orracademy.org

Rezin Orr Academy High School is a public four-year high school bordered between the neighborhoods of West Garfield and Humboldt Park located on the West Side of Chicago, Illinois. It is a part of the Chicago Public Schools district and is managed by the Academy for Urban School Leadership. The school is named after labor leader Rezin Orr.

== History ==
Orr traces its origins to 1918, when it was opened as an elementary school in a building, which is currently the Brian Piccolo Specialty School located at 1040 N. Keeler. Orr began hosting high school students in the 1920s, when it became a branch of Austin High School. From the 1940s to the 1950s, Orr was used a vocational school for seventh and eighth grade boys, and for a short period it served as a temporary home for Our Lady of the Angels School after that school was ravaged by a fire in 1958. Orr was then used as a branch of Marshall High School before becoming an independent high school in 1963.

Rezin Orr High School moved into a new building in 1973 under the leadership of principal, Kenneth Van Spankeren. The old Orr school building then became the Brian Piccolo Specialty School.

The current high school building was designed by the firm of Ludwig Mies van der Rohe.

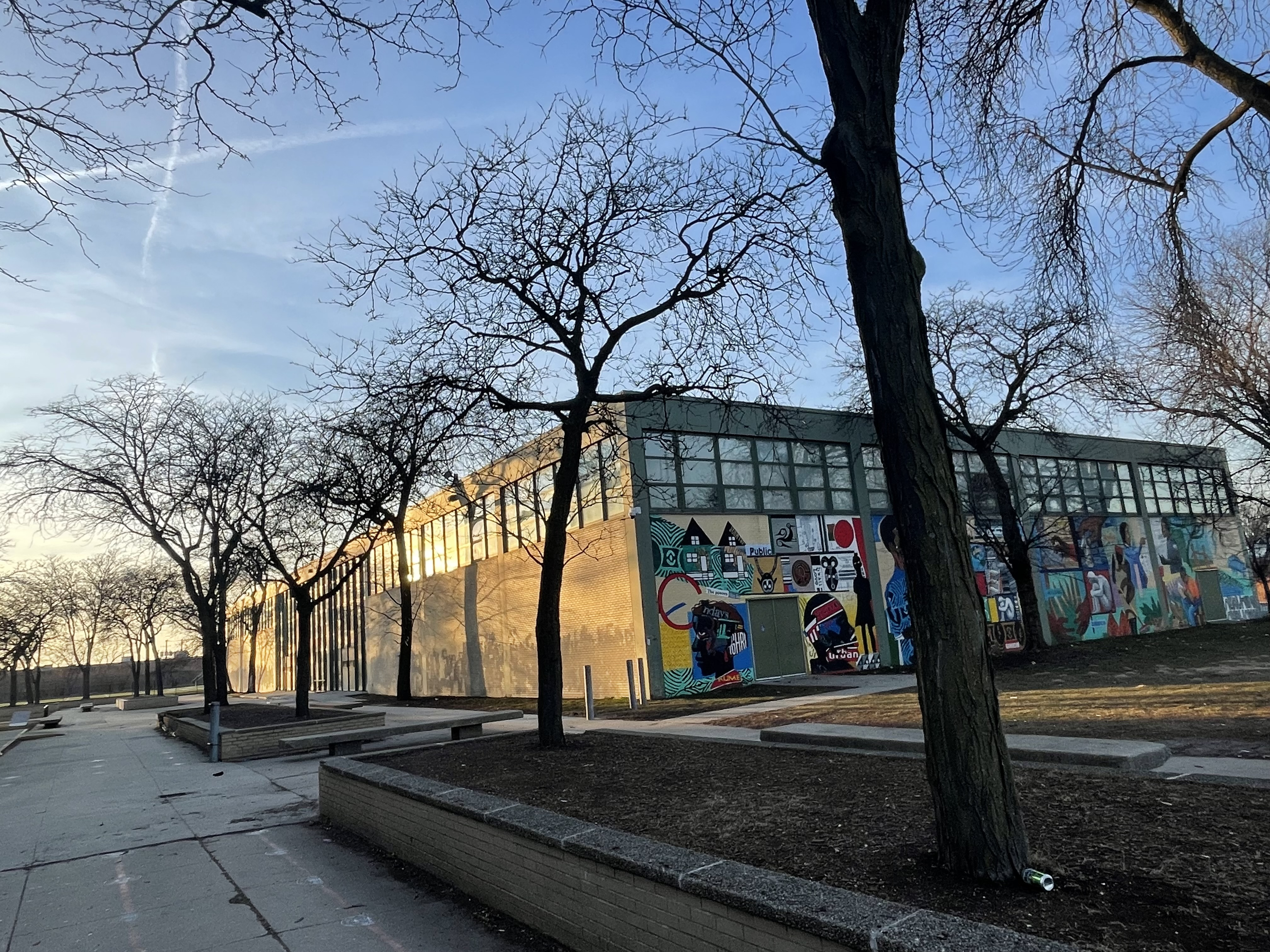

== Athletics ==
Orr competes in the Chicago Public League (CPL) and is a member of the Illinois High School Association (IHSA). The boys' basketball team were state champions in 2016-2017, 2017-2018 and 2018-2019.

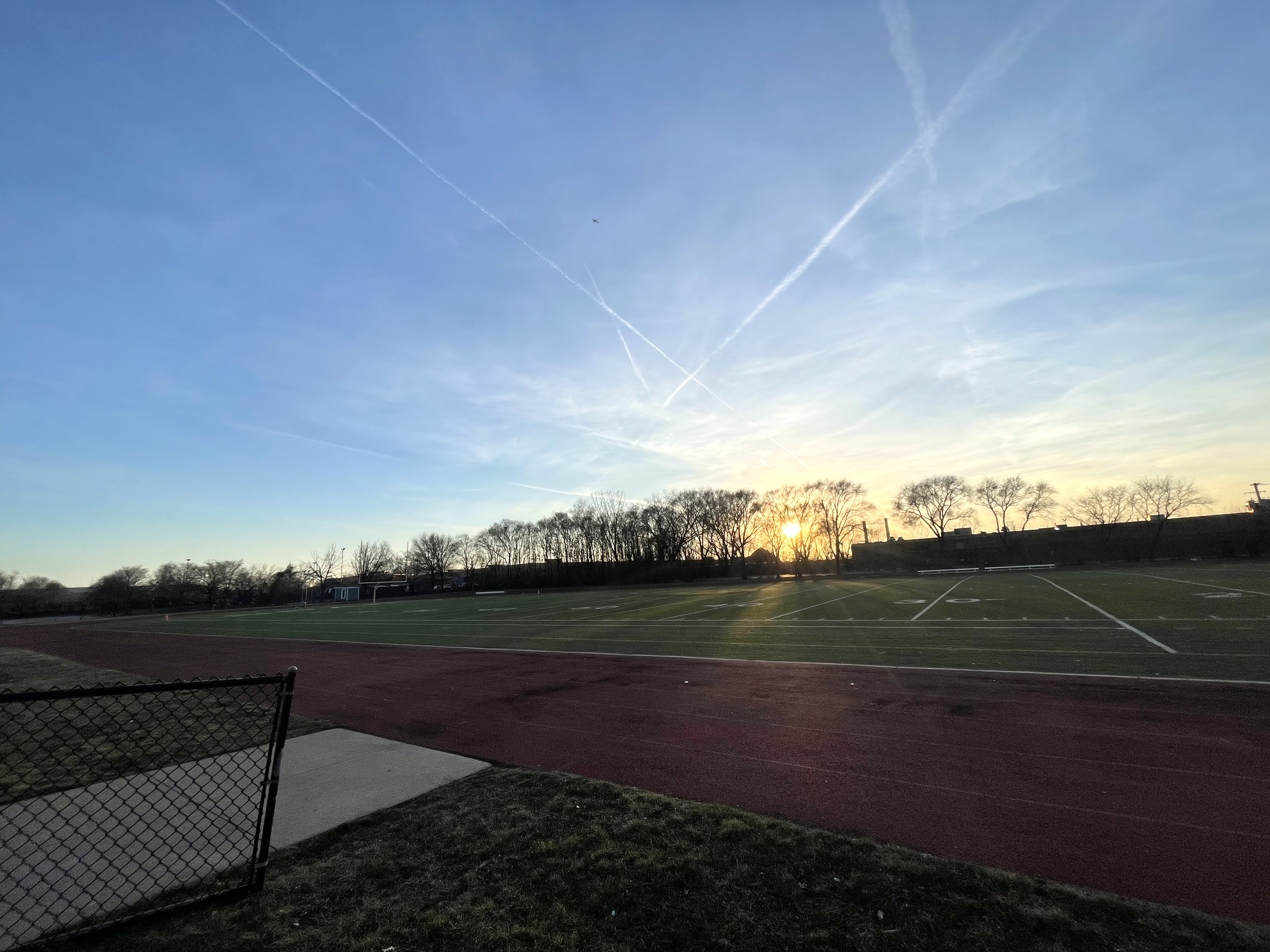
Rauner field

== Notable alumni ==
- Jay Davis (class of 1989), professional baseball player
- Myke Henry (class of 2011), professional basketball player
