= Andrew Farmer (American football) =

American football player (born 2000)

No. 50 – San Francisco 49ers
- Position: Linebacker
- Roster status: Injured reserve

Personal information
- Born: April 19, 2000 (age 26); Jacksonville, Florida, U.S.
- Listed height: 6 ft 4 in (1.93 m)
- Listed weight: 250 lb (113 kg)

Career information
- High school: First Coast (Jacksonville)
- College: Lane (2018–2022)
- NFL draft: 2023: undrafted

Career history
- Los Angeles Chargers (2023); Denver Broncos (2024)*; San Francisco 49ers (2025–present)
- * Offseason or practice squad member only

Career NFL statistics as of 2024
- Total tackles: 3
- Stats at Pro Football Reference

Andrew Farmer II (born April 19, 2000) is an American professional football linebacker for the San Francisco 49ers of the National Football League (NFL). He played college football for the Lane Dragons.

== College career ==
Farmer attended and played college football at Lane College. In Farmer's college career, he notched 140 tackles and 19.5 sacks.

== Professional career ==
Pre-draft measurables
Height	Weight	Arm length	Hand span	Wingspan	40-yard dash	10-yard split	20-yard split	20-yard shuttle	Three-cone drill	Vertical jump	Broad jump	Bench press
6 ft 3 in (1.91 m)	250 lb (113 kg)	32 1/4 in (0.82 m)	10 1/8 in (0.26 m)	6 ft 7 1/8 in (2.01 m)	4.79 s	1.68 s	2.68 s	4.59 s	7.72 s	38 in (0.97 m)	10 ft 5 in (3.18 m)	25 reps
All values from NFL HBCU Combine/Pro Day

=== Los Angeles Chargers ===
Farmer signed as an undrafted free agent with the Los Angeles Chargers. He was waived following final roster cuts on August 29, 2023 and subsequently signed to the practice squad. He made his NFL debut in Week 4 against the Las Vegas Raiders. On November 22, Farmer was signed to the active roster following an injury to Joey Bosa.

On August 27, 2024, Farmer was waived by the Chargers and re-signed to the practice squad, but released a few days later.

=== Denver Broncos ===
On September 17, 2024, Farmer was signed to the Denver Broncos' practice squad. He signed a reserve/future contract with Denver on January 13, 2025. On August 25, Farmer was waived by the Broncos.

=== San Francisco 49ers ===
On November 5, 2025, Farmer signed with the San Francisco 49ers' practice squad. On January 20, 2026, he signed a reserve/futures contract with San Francisco. On July 29, Farmer was waived by the 49ers with an injury designation and reverted to injured reserve the following day.
