= Jermaine Thomas =

American gridiron football player (born 1990)

No. 38
- Position: Running back

Personal information
- Born: January 10, 1990 (age 36); Jacksonville, Florida, U.S.
- Listed height: 5 ft 11 in (1.80 m)
- Listed weight: 196 lb (89 kg)

Career information
- College: Florida State
- NFL draft: 2012: undrafted

Career history
- Saskatchewan Roughriders (2014)*
- * Offseason or practice squad member only
- Stats at CFL.ca (archive)

Jermaine Thomas (born January 10, 1990) is a former professional American football running back. He played college football for the Florida State Seminoles.

== Early life ==
Thomas attended First Coast High School playing running back. Thomas was a member of the AJC Super Southern 100 and a second team 4A All-State selection.

== College career ==
Thomas went to college at Florida State, and played four seasons with the Seminoles. A true freshman in 2008, Thomas played 12 games registering 482 rushing yards. In 2009, Thomas played in all 13 games, including 10 starts, and had a team leading 10 touchdowns and ranked first in rushing with 832 yards, making it a 64 yards per game average. Thomas recorded three straight 100-yard rushing games in 2009.

However, in 2010, Thomas only made eight starts (including the first six games) but sat out for the rest with a knee sprain. Ran for 490 yards on 86 carries and six touchdowns. Made 12 receptions for 134 yards and one touchdown.

In his final season with the Seminoles in 2011, Thomas played eight games ranked second on the team in attempts with 61 and yards with 279. Thomas averaged 4.6 yards per rush and had nine receptions for 122 yards.

Thomas is ranked ninth all time in FSU rushing touchdowns with 19 and 12th all time in rushing yards with 2,083. In four seasons, Thomas had six 100-yard rushing games.

== Professional career ==
In January 2014, Thomas signed with the Saskatchewan Roughriders of the Canadian Football League. He was released by the Roughriders on June 22, 2014.
