= New York City Teaching Fellows =

Alternative certification program in New York City public schools

NYC Teaching Fellows
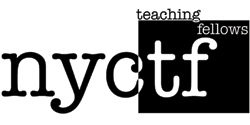
- Founded: 2000
- Headquarters: New York City,
- Key people: NYC Department of Education, TNTP
- Website: www.nycteachingfellows.org

The NYC Teaching Fellows is an alternative certification program that focuses on education quality in New York City public schools by attracting mid-career professionals, recent graduates, and retirees from all over the country. The program provides teacher training, coursework, and resources. Fellows are eligible for a fast track into full-time teaching positions in New York City public schools following pre-service training.

== History ==
The NYC Teaching Fellows program launched in the spring of 2000 as a collaboration between The New Teacher Project (TNTP) and the NYC Department of Education to address the most severe teacher shortage in New York's public school system in decades. Over the past ten years, NYC Teaching Fellows has become the largest alternative certification program in the country and has provided NYC public schools with over 13,500 new teachers.

Since 2000, the NYC Teaching Fellows program has helped to staff the highest need subject areas in New York City's highest-need schools. In 2009, 11% of current teachers in NYC public schools came through the Teaching Fellows program, with 8,800 teachers from the NYC Teaching Fellows program currently teaching NYC public school students as of the 2009-2010 school-year.

== Components of the Fellowship ==
As an alternative route to teaching certification, the NYC Teaching Fellows program is designed for individuals with no prior experience teaching in public schools. Rather than completing a traditional teacher education program prior to entering the classroom, Fellows go through an intensive pre-service training program and pursue a partially subsidized master's degree in education while teaching at a New York City public school.

Individuals that are already certified to teach or have extensive coursework in education are not eligible for the Fellowship.

While completing their master's degree, Fellows work under the Transitional B certificate issued by the New York State Department of Education. The Transitional B certificate is issued only to individuals who are enrolled in and remain in good standing with an alternative certification program. For Fellows, this means they must obtain a full-time teaching position at a NYC public school and must be working toward a master's degree in education.

Fellows are required to continue teaching at a NYC public school for the duration of their master's degree, which can take between two and five years to complete. Upon completion of the master's degree, Fellows are eligible to apply for the Initial Certificate with the New York State Department of Education. The Initial Certificate allows Fellows to teach anywhere in New York State; however, the NYC Teaching Fellows program encourages Fellows to continue teaching in NYC public schools beyond the duration of the Fellowship.

== Impact of the Program ==
NYC Teaching Fellows make up 11% of the entire teaching force in New York City, and each year, they account for a significant share of new teacher hires in high-need subject areas such as special education. Overall, 22% of all special education teachers, 18% of all science teachers, and 26% of all math teachers in New York City are Fellows. 84% of Fellows teach in schools that are eligible to receive funding due to a high population of students from low-income families (Title I).

A recently released report published by the Urban Institute credits the NYC Teaching Fellows for improving teacher quality in high-need schools in New York City, and consequently, helping to close the opportunity gap and produce better outcomes for students.

== Retention ==
The retention rate of New York City Teaching Fellows exceeds the national average, with 87% of NYC Teaching Fellows completing their first year of teaching and beginning a second year of teaching, 73% teaching for at least three years, and half teaching at least five years. Fellows have also begun taking on leadership positions, with 398 Fellows currently serving as Principals and Assistant Principals in NYC public schools.

== Placement ==
After successfully completing pre-service training, Fellows are eligible to secure a full-time teaching position at a NYC public school. The NYC Teaching Fellows program supports Fellows in their job search by providing them access to job postings, school interview events, and Department of Education job fairs. However, Fellows ultimately find their own teaching positions in order to ensure a good match between the teacher and the school. The NYC Teaching Fellows program recruits Fellows in the subject areas where there are anticipated vacancies and does not guarantee job placement for its Fellows in NYC public schools. As a result, some Fellows begin the school year without full-time teaching positions. Because Fellows benefit from a tuition subsidy from the NYC Department of Education, these Fellows are given a deadline to find positions or face dismissal from the program. June 2013 Fellows who did not secure positions by the beginning of the 2013–2014 school year have until January 2014. 96% of June 2013 Fellows secured teaching positions by the first day of school.

== Controversy ==
At the beginning of the school year of 2008, more than 100 first-year Fellows did not have a job, more than any other year. The NYC Teaching Fellows canceled the mid-year cohort for the first time in response to so many Fellows not finding a job. By the time the original December 5 deadline for finding a job came around, a little less than 100 were still without jobs. The United Federation of Teachers filed a lawsuit against the Department of Education, maintaining that the Fellows without an official placement, many of whom were still teaching full course loads, should not be laid off. The court granted an injunction, suspending the December 5th firing date until February 2, at the end of the semester. It is not known how many Fellows did not have a job by the new deadline.

== See also ==
- Alternative teaching certification
