= Baldwin Middle-Senior High School =

Public secondary school in Baldwin, Florida

Coordinates: 30.304365°N 81.978191°W

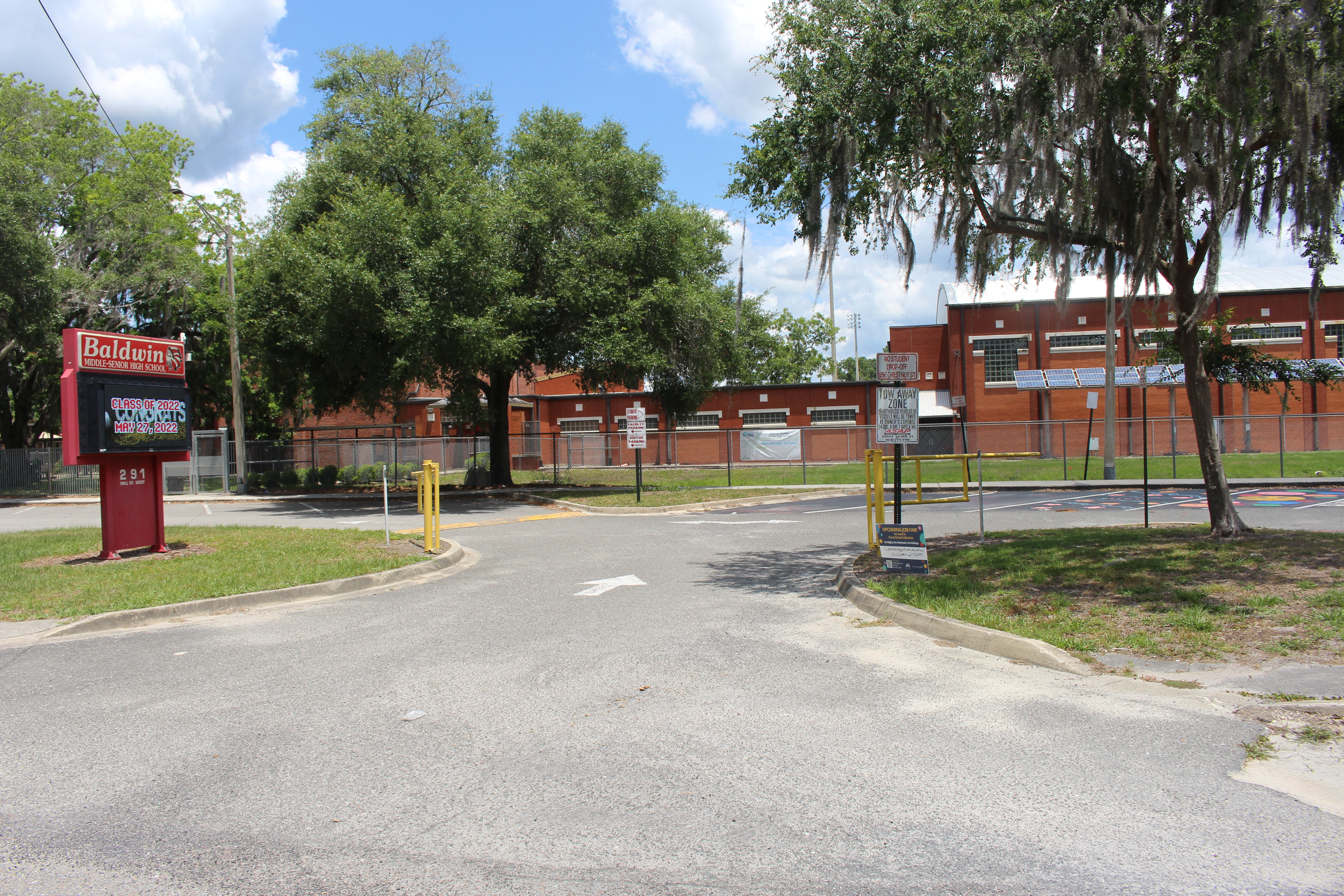

Location
- 291 Mill Street, West; Baldwin, Florida 32234; United States

Information
- Type: Public
- Motto: Bring Your A Game!
- Established: 1919
- Status: Open
- Principal: Mike Townsend
- Teaching staff: 71.00 (FTE)
- Grades: 6–12
- Enrollment: 1,479 (2023-2024)
- Student to teacher ratio: 20.83
- Hours in school day: 7:15 a.m. – 2:00 p.m
- Campus: Rural
- Colors: Red and white
- Nickname: Indians
- Newspaper: The Drum Beat (Middle School); Indian Trails (High School)
- Yearbook: Indian Pride
- Website: www.duvalschools.org/bmsh

Baldwin Middle-Senior High School is a public secondary school in Baldwin, Florida, United States, part of the Duval County School District. Located within the Baldwin city limits, the school has a middle school and a high school.

== Academics ==
The school currently has a "B" as of the 2022-2023 school year according to the Florida School Accountability Grading Scale.
