= Riverside High School (Florida) =

Location
- 1200 South McDuff Avenue; Jacksonville, Florida 32205-8098; United States; 30°18′26″N 81°42′14″W

Information
- Former name: Robert E. Lee High School (1927–2021)
- Type: Public magnet
- Motto: “Go Generals”
- Established: 1927
- School district: Duval County Public Schools
- Superintendent: Dr. Christopher Bernier
- Principal: Chris Koek
- Staff: 73.00 (FTE)
- Enrollment: 1,593 (2023-2024)
- Student to teacher ratio: 21.82
- Campus: Urban
- Colors: Lime green and royal blue
- Mascot: The Riverside Star
- Nickname: Generals
- Newspaper: The Traveler
- Yearbook: The Blue and Gray
- Website: Riverside HS website

Riverside High School is a four-year secondary institution in Jacksonville, Florida. It was originally named after Confederate States of America general Robert E. Lee. Located in the Riverside and Avondale neighborhood, it is the second oldest high school in Jacksonville operating at its original location, after its traditional rival, Andrew Jackson High School. The name was changed to Riverside High School in 2021 as part of the recommendation by the Naming Commission.

Riverside is part of the Duval County magnet school program. Eligible students at the school can earn concurrent credit through the Jacksonville Early College High School program. They receive high school credits from the school and college credit from Florida State College at Jacksonville for the same courses.

Riverside students can also specialize in courses through the Engineering Academy or the Math and Science Magnet Program. In addition, there is a Liberal Arts curriculum. The Early College, Engineering, Math and Science, plus Liberal Arts courses of study are known as the school's four learning communities.

Riverside is one of 20 high schools in the Duval County Public Schools. Riverside, like all other district schools, is accredited by the Southern Association of Colleges and Schools.

== History ==
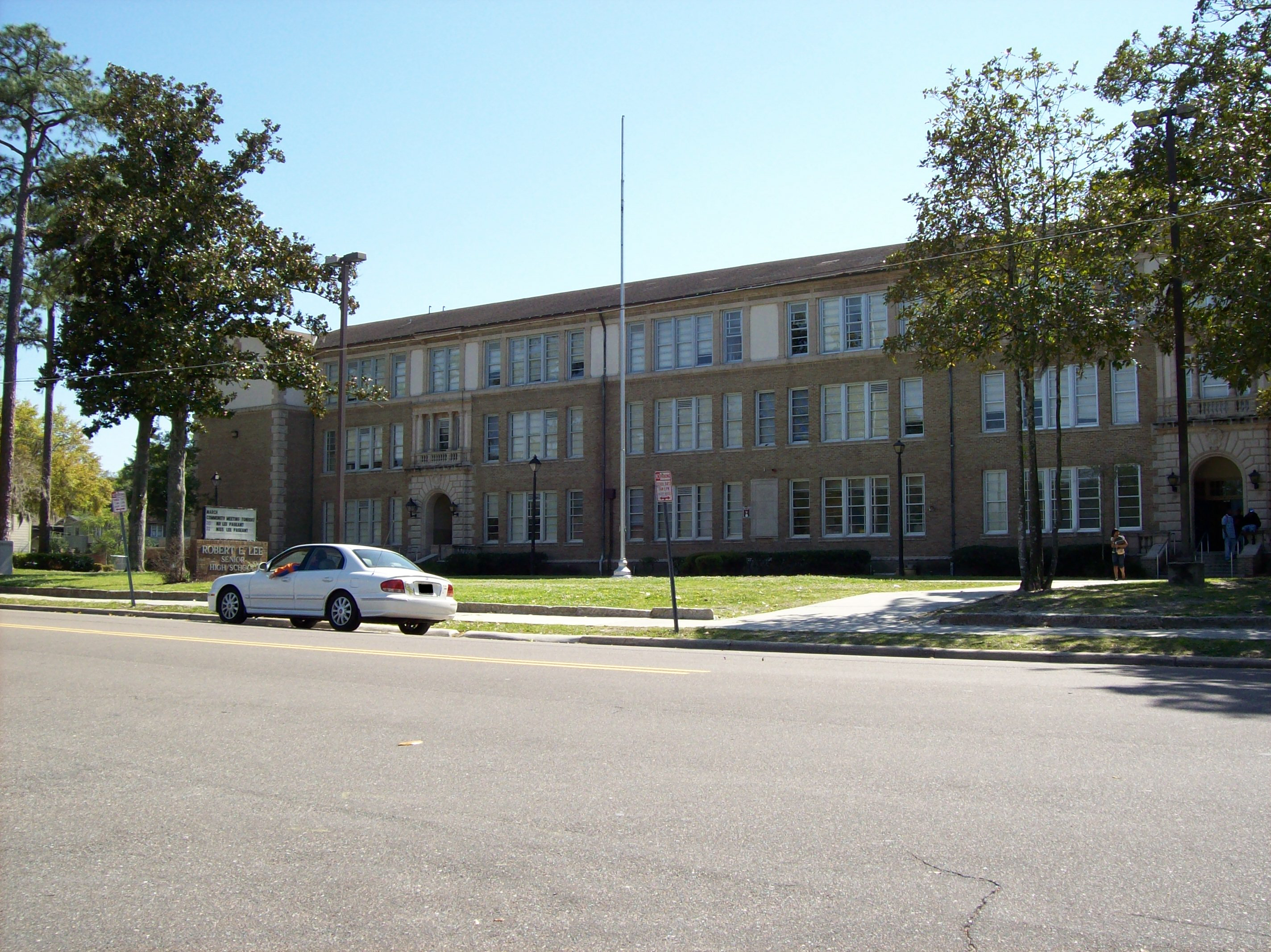
Riverside High School

Architect Victor Earl Mark (1876–1948) designed Lee High School with William B. Ittner of St. Louis in 1926–27. Both architects also designed the similarly designed Andrew Jackson High School.

The school was dedicated to Confederate general Robert E. Lee on his birthday, January 19, 1928. Jacksonville's three newly constructed high schools—Lee High, Andrew Jackson High, and Julia E. Landon High (named for a South Jacksonville teacher)—spread out students from the city's original whites-only high school, Duval High School (c. 1873–1927). Black students at the time attended Stanton High School, which moved to a new facility in 1953.

The main structure is notable for its beige bricks and top floor off-white stucco. It is framed by four gabled transepts, which in turn are framed by ground-to-roof stacks of alternating small and large cornerstones. The top floor stucco of the four transepts feature a coat of arms, in which a central figure reaches for a star on the left, while a tree occupies the right side. Also unique are the two front arch doorways, which sport an impressive amount of "radiating" stonework.

The main building has an auditorium and a large courtyard. A field house was added between the stadium and the back of the school in the 1940s. Later, a first floor addition on the original structure's right side accommodated a meeting room, a cafeteria expansion, and the boys' locker room. The basketball gym was built to the right of the school, and the shop and music buildings were located behind the original building to the left at end of Donald Street.

Around 1964, the school board converted Landon High School to a junior high school. This made Lee and Jackson the two oldest Jacksonville high schools operating at their original sites.

In 1965, a group of Lee students formed the band My Backyard. The band, led by singer Ronnie Van Zant, was renamed Lynyrd Skynyrd after coach Leonard Skinner sent guitarist Gary Rossington to the principal's office for wearing his hair long.

Lee underwent two desegregation cycles, with faculty integrated from 1968–71, then students in the 1971–72 school year.

In the early 1980s, the school constructed an outdoor pool between the gym and the original building. Before that time, the swim teams trained at the Episcopal Church of the Good Shepherd Pool, located about a mile north. Lee Pool is used by the athletic teams and physical education classes during the school year. In the summer, it becomes a free public pool operated by the City of Jacksonville Parks & Recreation Department.

On November 24, 1986, Lee was ravaged by a fire that destroyed the library and many classrooms. The fire damage was estimated at $4.5 million. After the fire, the Robert E. Lee High School Restoration Committee was formed by Lee alumni to help raise money for restoration.

The cafeteria and the library were expanded during the restoration. In 1991, a new two-floor classroom building was built behind the original structure to accommodate the addition of Ninth Grade. Lee had been a three-year high school since its opening in 1927. Part of the old shop building was torn down to make way for the new two-floor building. The field house was also expanded in 1991.

Lee was one of 11 schools nationwide selected by the College Board for inclusion in the 2006-10 EXCELerator School Improvement Model program. The educational partnership, funded by the Bill & Melinda Gates Foundation, was designed to raise Lee's graduation rate and improve college readiness, especially among minority and low income students.

In 2010, Lee's engineering magnet program was recognized as a Model Academy by the National Career Academy Coalition (NCAC). Only 16 schools in the United States have earned this title.

The engineering program also earned two honors from the Florida Engineering Society (FES). Jeffrey G. Cumber was recognized as the 2010 Teacher of the Year, and Lee won the School of the Year title. Cumber and Lee High School respectively received $500 checks from the affiliated Florida Engineering Foundation (FEF).

=== Architecture ===
The campus reflects the Open Air architectural values of the Progressive Education Movement (1875–1955). The Progressives felt that schools should resemble the outdoors as much as possible. The numerous windows bring in a lot of natural light. So, the original building is less dependent on artificial lighting. This is one of the "green" advantages of historic buildings.

The original building's courtyard, roomy stairwells, and ample hallways give students a healthy amount of physical space. Before air conditioning was installed in the late 1980s, the natural ventilation helped the school "breathe." Students found the air temperature very comfortable from October to April. Lee was also given radiators for the winter. September and May were the only months when the heat and humidity were a consideration. The Open Air Style was a reaction to the dark, crowded, and poorly ventilated buildings that plagued poor school districts.

=== Claim to oldest high school in Jacksonville ===
Riverside, and Andrew Jackson are the two oldest Jacksonville high schools still operating at their original sites, with Stanton the oldest overall continuing secondary education institution in Jacksonville, starting as a Freedmen's Bureau-run school in 1868 for Black students. That facility moved from its original West Ashley Street Building to a new West 13th Street building in 1953.

=== Renaming ===
The school name was the source of considerable controversy as many found the use of the Confederate general's name to be a symbol of white supremacy. By 2021 the school district's board of education began considering giving the school a different name. As a result, some residents argued against renaming. There was an online petition that, by March 25, 2021, got over 15,000 signatures asking for a name change.

In April 2021, Amy Donofrio, a Riverside teacher who co-founded a program promoting juvenile justice, EVAC Movement, was asked to take down a Black Lives Matter sign in her classroom. After complaining that the timing was retaliation for live streaming white members of community meetings making "questionable comments" about the name change, she was administratively reassigned. The Southern Poverty Law Center has filed a lawsuit against Duval County Public Schools.

The Duval County School Board decided on June 1, 2021, by a 5-2 vote, to rename Robert E. Lee High School "Riverside High School." The school board estimated renaming costs to be $366,302, with the Jacksonville Jaguars and Nike coming forward to pay for the change for the school's uniforms and other related items. The name change became official on August 3, 2021, seven days before the start of the 2021–2022 school year.

== Enrollment ==
Total enrollment rose from 954 the first year to about 2000 in the 1950s. It generally declined to about 1,200 in the late 70s. It reached a low of 777 during the 1990–91 school year. After the incorporation of ninth grade in 1991–92, the total number of students slowly rose to a high of 1900 in the 2005-06 year. As of February 2011, a total of 1,732 students attended Lee.

The racial composition of the school has varied since full integration of Duval County began in the 1971–72 school year. Robert E. Lee became a majority Black school in the late 1980s. Then, it was majority White during the years 1991–96. It has been majority Black since 1996–97.

A total of 1829 students attended during the 2008–09 school year. Of that total, 63.6% were black, 23.3% were white, 6.5% were Hispanic, and 4.5% were Asian. One student was Native American and 36 were of unspecified ethnicity. The number of Asian students surpassed 50 in the 1992-93 year, but the group has fluctuated between a high of 82 and a low of 44.

== Feeder schools ==
- Westside Middle School
  - Ortega
  - John Stockton
  - Venetia
- Eugene Butler/YMLA/YWLA Middle School
  - Central Riverside
  - S.P. Livingston
  - Ruth Upson
  - West Jacksonville
- John Gorrie Junior High School (Former feeder school)
- Lake Shore Middle School
  - Bayview
  - Fishweir
  - Hyde Park
  - Ortega
  - Pinedale
  - John Stockton
  - Ramona
  - Ruth Upson
  - Venetia
  - West Riverside
- Springfield Middle School
  - (Magnet school is fed by all other magnet elementary schools.)

== Athletics ==
The Generals have won 15 FHSAA state championships. The following sports are offered at Riverside:

- Boys Cross Country
  - State champs - 1947-1949 and 1967
- Boys Golf
- Cheerleading
- Football
- Girls Bowling
- Girls Golf
- Swimming and Diving
- Volleyball
- Boys Basketball
  - State champs - 1930 and 1940
- Girls Basketball
- Boys Soccer
- Girls Soccer
- Girls Weightlifting
- Slow Pitch Softball
- Wrestling
- Baseball
  - State champs - 1945 and 1961
- Boys Tennis
- Girls Tennis
- Boys Track
  - State champs - 1930, 1937 and 1943-1947
- Girls Track
- Fast Pitch Softball
- Girls Flag Football
- Lacrosse
- Girls Lacrosse

== Notable alumni ==
- Hoyt Axton, singer, song writer, actor played football at Oklahoma State
- Catie Ball, Olympic swimmer
- Edgar Bennett, Florida State University and Green Bay Packers running back, wide receivers coach Las Vegas Raiders
- Randall Berg, public interest lawyer, former president of the Florida chapter of the ACLU
- Don Bessent, Brooklyn/Los Angeles Dodgers pitcher
- Bob Burns, founding drummer of Lynyrd Skynyrd
- LeRoy Butler, Hall of Fame and four-time All-Pro NFL safety for the Green Bay Packers
- Foster Castleman, Major League Baseball infielder
- Ander Crenshaw, Representative for the 4th district of Florida
- Celso de Mello, 1963-1964 AFS exchange student from Brazil, Senior Justice Supreme Federal Court
- Clarence Denmark, Winnipeg Blue Bombers (CFL) Slotback
- Sheck Exley, pioneering cave diver
- Ken Fallin, caricaturist for the Wall Street Journal
- Alex Fudge, professional basketball player
- Stumpy Harris, eminent domain lawyer
- Stetson Kennedy, author, folklorist, human rights activist
- Earl Leggett, Chicago Bears tackle
- Angelo Liteky, chaplain in Vietnam, Medal of Honor recipient, later renounced
- Allen Lynch, soldier in Vietnam, Medal of Honor recipient
- Mark McCumber, professional golfer
- Ron Meeks, defensive coordinator for the Indianapolis Colts
- Jessica Morris, actress who has appeared on American soap opera One Life to Live
- Stephen Nicholas, National Football League player for the Atlanta Falcons
- Tahveon Nicholson, college football player
- Gary Rossington, founding guitarist of Lynyrd Skynyrd
- Corky Rogers, winningest football coach in Florida
- Hans Tanzler, former mayor of Jacksonville
- Donnie Van Zant, member of the band 38 Special
- Johnny Van Zant, current lead vocalist of Lynyrd Skynyrd
- Ronnie Van Zant, founding lead vocalist of Lynyrd Skynyrd
- Harmon Wages, Atlanta Falcons fullback, Gatorade actor
- Dale Willis, Major League Baseball pitcher
