= First Coast High School =

Public high school in Jacksonville, Florida, United States

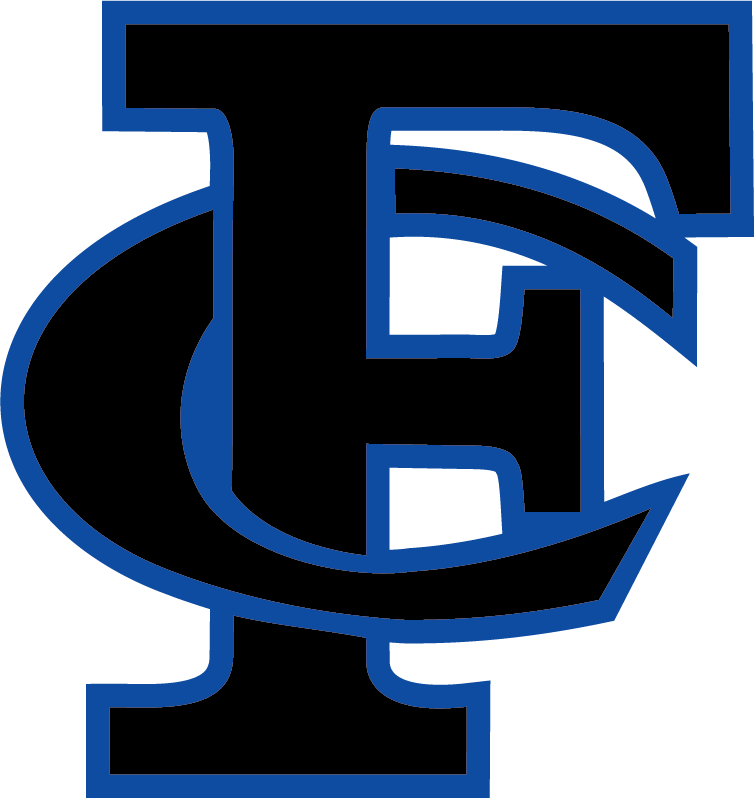

Location
- 590 Duval Station Road; Jacksonville, Florida 32218; United States; 30.482560°N 81.607680°W

Information
- Other names: First Coast, FCHS
- Type: Public high school
- Established: 1990; 36 years ago
- School district: Duval County Public Schools
- Superintendent: Christopher Bernier
- CEEB code: 100741
- NCES School ID: 120048002745
- Principal: Ronnie Williams
- Teaching staff: 92.00 (on an FTE basis)
- Grades: 9–12
- Enrollment: 2,137 (2023-2024)
- Student to teacher ratio: 23.23
- Campus type: Urban
- Colors: Black, Blue, & Silver
- Mascot: Buccaneer
- Website: dcps.duvalschools.org/fch

First Coast High School is a comprehensive public high school in Jacksonville, Florida, United States. It was opened concurrently with its sister school, Mandarin High School. The school is one of 47 high schools in the Duval County School District. Like all Duval County schools, it is accredited through the Southern Association of Colleges and Schools.

Duval County property appraiser states its campus size is 317,321 sqft.

== History ==
The school was opened in 1990. Its sister school, Mandarin High School, was opened concurrently using identical building plans. The school's design is unique for Jacksonville schools (other than Mandarin, which started with an identical layout). The school is built around a large paved courtyard, reminiscent of Spanish architecture from the colonial period of Latin America. In 2006, an additional wing was added to the school, to accommodate the explosive growth in North Jacksonville.

== Academics ==
As of the 2018–19 school year, First Coast High School had an enrollment of 1,991 and 94 classroom teachers (on an FTE basis), for a student-teacher ratio of 21:1. Of those 1,991 students, 49.2 percent (979) of them were eligible for free or reduced lunch under the National School Lunch Act.

In 2019, the school received a "B" on the Florida Department of Education's School Accountability Grading Scale. First Coast was one of 16 schools nationwide selected by College Board for inclusion in the 2007–08 EXCELerator School Improvement Model program. The educational partnership, funded by the Bill & Melinda Gates Foundation, was designed to raise the school's graduation rate and improve college readiness, especially among minority and low income students.

== Notable alumni ==
- Lil Duval (1995), recording artist and comedian
- Nigel Carr (2008), former NFL linebacker
- Jermaine Thomas (2008), former CFL running back
- Tavaris Barnes (2009), former NFL defensive end
- Justin Lawrence (2012), pitcher for the Pittsburgh Pirates
- Reggie Northrup (2012), former NFL linebacker and MMA fighter
- D. J. Killings (2013), former NFL cornerback
- De'Andre Johnson (2015), former USFL quarterback
- Jaylon McClain-Sapp (2016), former NFL defensive back
- Andrew Farmer (2018), linebacker for the San Francisco 49ers
