= Englewood High School (Florida) =

Location
- 4412 Barnes Road; Jacksonville, Florida 32207; United States; 30.277723°N 81.610791°W

Information
- Other name: EHS
- Type: Public high school
- School district: Duval County Public Schools
- NCES School ID: 120048000685
- Principal: Marleny Chirino
- Teaching staff: 83.00 (on an FTE basis)
- Grades: 9–12
- Enrollment: 1,896 (2024-2025)
- Student to teacher ratio: 22.84
- Colors: Black and gold
- Mascot: Ram
- Website: dcps.duvalschools.org/ehs

Englewood High School (EHS) is a public high school in Jacksonville, Florida, United States. It is part of the Duval County Public Schools district.

== Notable alumni ==
- Barbara Blank (2005), model, actress, reality television personality, and professional wrestler
- RJ Cyler, actor
- Ryan Freel (1994), MLB player
- Rashean Mathis (1999), NFL player
- Daniel Murphy (2003), MLB player
- Brett Myers (1999), MLB player
- Ray Nettles (1968), CFL player
- Willie Smith (1983), NFL player
- Butch Trucks, drummer
