= Academy for Urban School Leadership =

American school management organization

AUSL (Academy for Urban School Leadership)
- Founded: 2001
- Founder: Martin Koldyke
- Type: School Management Organization and Teacher Preparation Program
- Location: Chicago, IL
- Coordinates: 41.9419°N 87.7763°W
- Key people: Donald Feinstein, Ph.D., Executive Director Shana Hayes, Managing Director, External Affairs Scott Macdonald, Managing Director, Strategy and Operations Jarvis Sanford, Managing Director, Managing Director, AUSL Network Schools
- Website: auslchicago.org

AUSL (Academy for Urban School Leadership) is a Chicago nonprofit school management organization founded in 2001. Today, it manages 31 Chicago Public Schools serving more than 16,000 students. Over 1,045 teachers have graduated from the AUSL Chicago Teacher Residency.

== History ==
Former Chicago Public Schools (CPS) President Arne Duncan met with financier Martin Koldyke and CPS educator Dr. Donald Feinstein and developed the idea of creating a specialized training program for teachers in urban schools. That led to the development of the Chicago Teacher Residency.

== Chicago Teacher Residency Program ==
The Chicago Teacher Residency Class of 2012

The centerpiece of AUSL's efforts is the Chicago Teacher Residency program, a year-long urban teacher training program in Chicago's Public Schools. The 12-month, full-time, paid training program combines teacher preparation, licensure, and a master's degree.

After the training year, graduates commit to teach in an AUSL-managed Chicago Public School for at least four years.

== Network of Schools ==
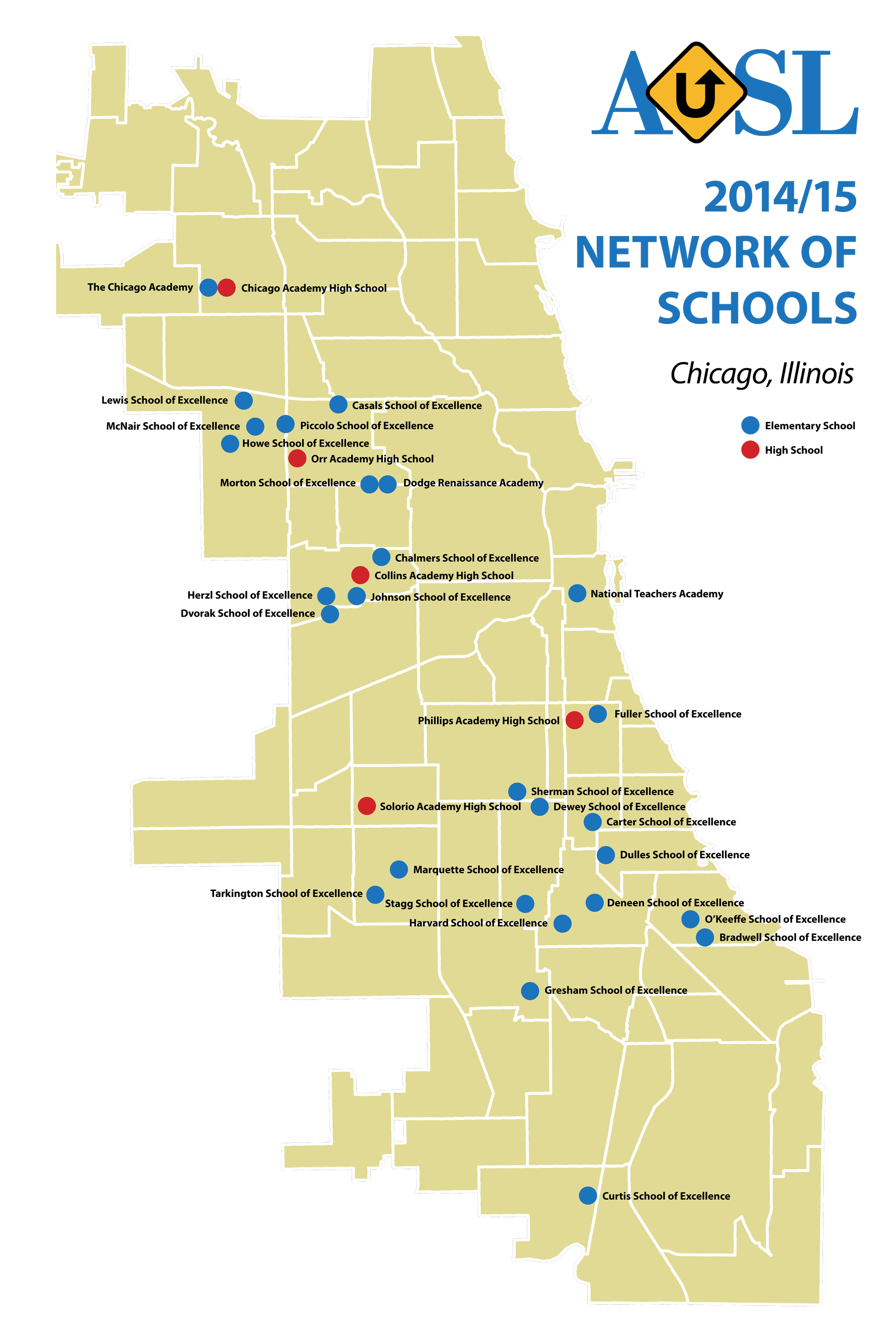
AUSL Network of Schools Map

AUSL manages 31 Chicago Public Schools serving over 16,000 students. AUSL schools operate within the CPS system.

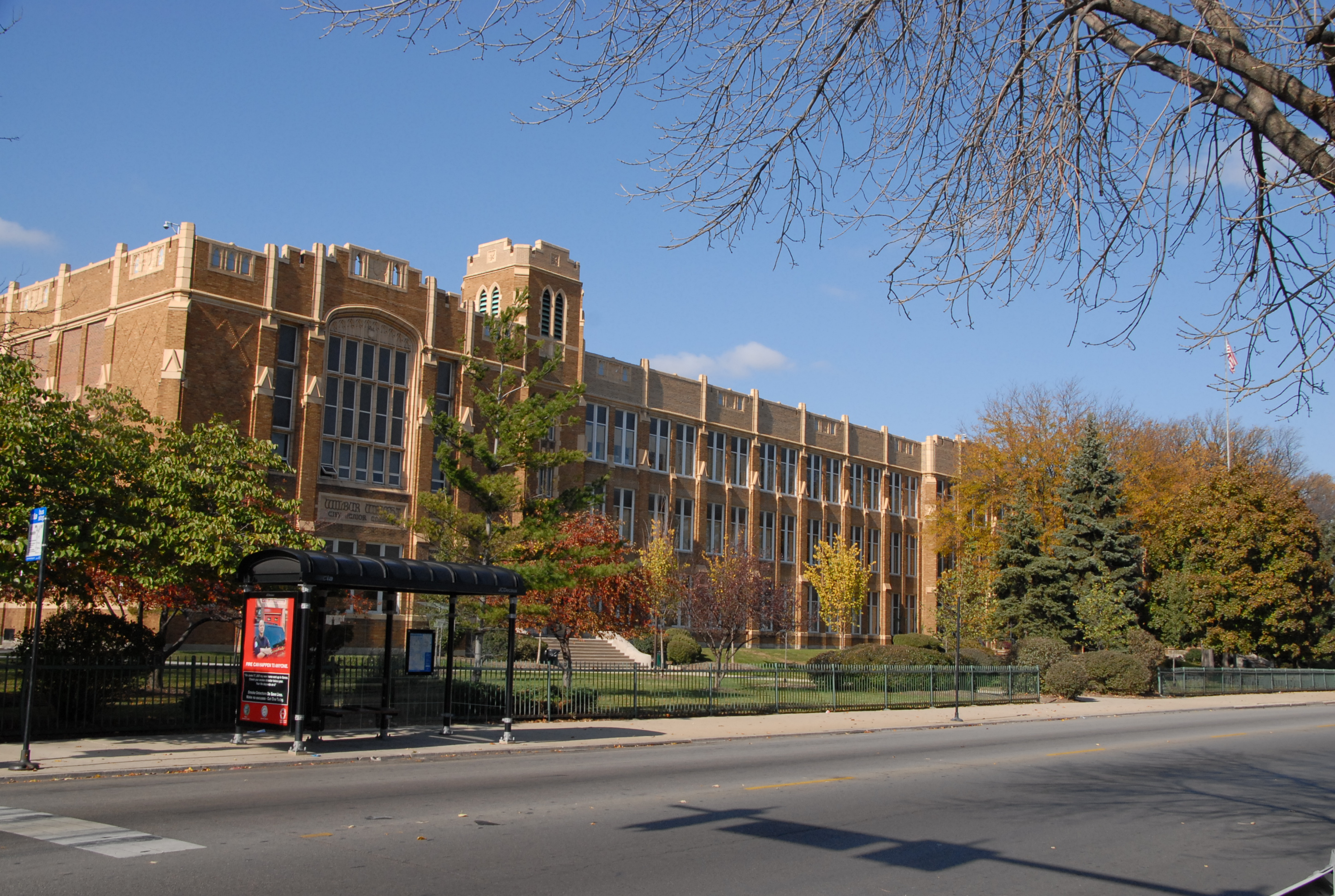
The Chicago Academy, housed in the former Wilbur Wright College building, is AUSL’s first teacher training site.

School name	Neighborhood	Grades
Bradwell School of Excellence	South Shore	Pre K-8
Carter School of Excellence	Washington Park	Pre K-8
Casals School of Excellence	Humboldt Park	Pre K-8
Chalmers School of Excellence	North Lawndale	Pre K-8
The Chicago Academy	Dunning	Pre K-8
Chicago Academy High School	Dunning	9-12
Collins Academy High School	North Lawndale	9-12
Curtis School of Excellence	Roseland	Pre K-8
Deneen School of Excellence	Greater Grand Crossing	Pre K-8
Dewey School of Excellence	New City	Pre K-8
Dulles School of Excellence	Greater Grand Crossing	Pre K-8
Dvorak School of Excellence	North Lawndale	Pre K-8
Fuller School of Excellence	Grand Boulevard	Pre K-8
Gresham School of Excellence	Auburn Gresham	Pre K-8
Harvard School of Excellence	Greater Grand Crossing	Pre K-8
Herzl School of Excellence	North Lawndale	Pre K-8
Howe School of Excellence	Austin	Pre K-8
Johnson School of Excellence	North Lawndale	Pre K-8
Lewis School of Excellence	Austin	Pre K-8
Marquette School of Excellence	Chicago Lawn	Pre K-8
McNair School of Excellence	Austin	Pre K-8
Morton School of Excellence	East Garfield Park	Pre K-8
National Teachers Academy	Near South Side	Pre K-8
O'Keeffe School of Excellence	South Shore	Pre K-8
Orr Academy High School	Humboldt Park	9-12
Phillips Academy High School	Douglas	9-12
Piccolo School of Excellence	Humboldt Park	Pre K-8
Sherman School of Excellence	New City	Pre K-8
Solorio Academy High School	Gage Park	9-12
Stagg School of Excellence	Englewood	Pre K-8
Tarkington School of Excellence	Chicago Lawn	Pre K-8

== Results ==
- U.S. News & World Report Education ranked Chicago Academy High School in the top ten best public high schools in the city of Chicago.
- Morton School of Excellence has maintained Level 1 status since school year 2010-11. In 2012, Morton School of Excellence surpassed the district ISAT average, the first school to achieve this milestone.
- In 2013, Phillips Academy High School achieved Level 1 status for the first time in its history.
- Every year since 2008, AUSL elementary schools, on average, have surpassed the district's growth on ISAT gains.

=== Independent Research ===
The University of Chicago Consortium on Chicago School Research and American Institutes for Research in 2012 released a summary from their independent research evaluating the effect of reform including AUSL schools The study concluded the following:

- Four years after intervention, the gap in test scores between reformed elementary/middle schools and the school system average closed by almost half in reading and by two-thirds in mathematics.
- The teacher workforce after intervention across all models was more likely to be white, younger, and less experienced, and were more likely to have provisional certification than teachers who were at those schools before the intervention.
- Without intervention, the comparison neighborhood schools saw minimal to no increases in average test scores.
- Furthermore, these significant results were achieved serving the same students as before intervention.
- Transformation of an elementary school is a process, not an event. The gains seen in the fourth year vs. the comparison schools are higher than those seen in the first year.
- High schools that underwent reform did not show significant improvements in absences or ninth grade on-track-to-graduate rates over matched comparison schools, but recent high school efforts look more promising than earlier ones.

== Criticism ==
A Chicago Tribune article on AUSL from February 2012 entitled "School reform organization gets average grades" stated that,

Most of AUSL turnarounds score below CPS averages on the percentage of students meeting or exceeding state benchmarks on standardized testing. Those schools that beat district averages have been accused of pushing out their lowest-performing students or those with discipline problems to artificially inflate their test scores.
