= Duval County Public Schools =

Public school district in the United States

Location
- 1701 Prudential Drive, Jacksonville, Duval County, Florida, 32207 United States

District information
- Motto: Every School. Every Classroom. Every Student. Every Day.
- Established: 1933
- Superintendent: Christopher Bernier
- Schools: 196
- Budget: $3.5 billion (FY2023)

Students and staff
- Students: 130,278
- Teachers: 8,284

Other information
- Language: English or bilingual with Spanish
- Website: www.duvalschools.org

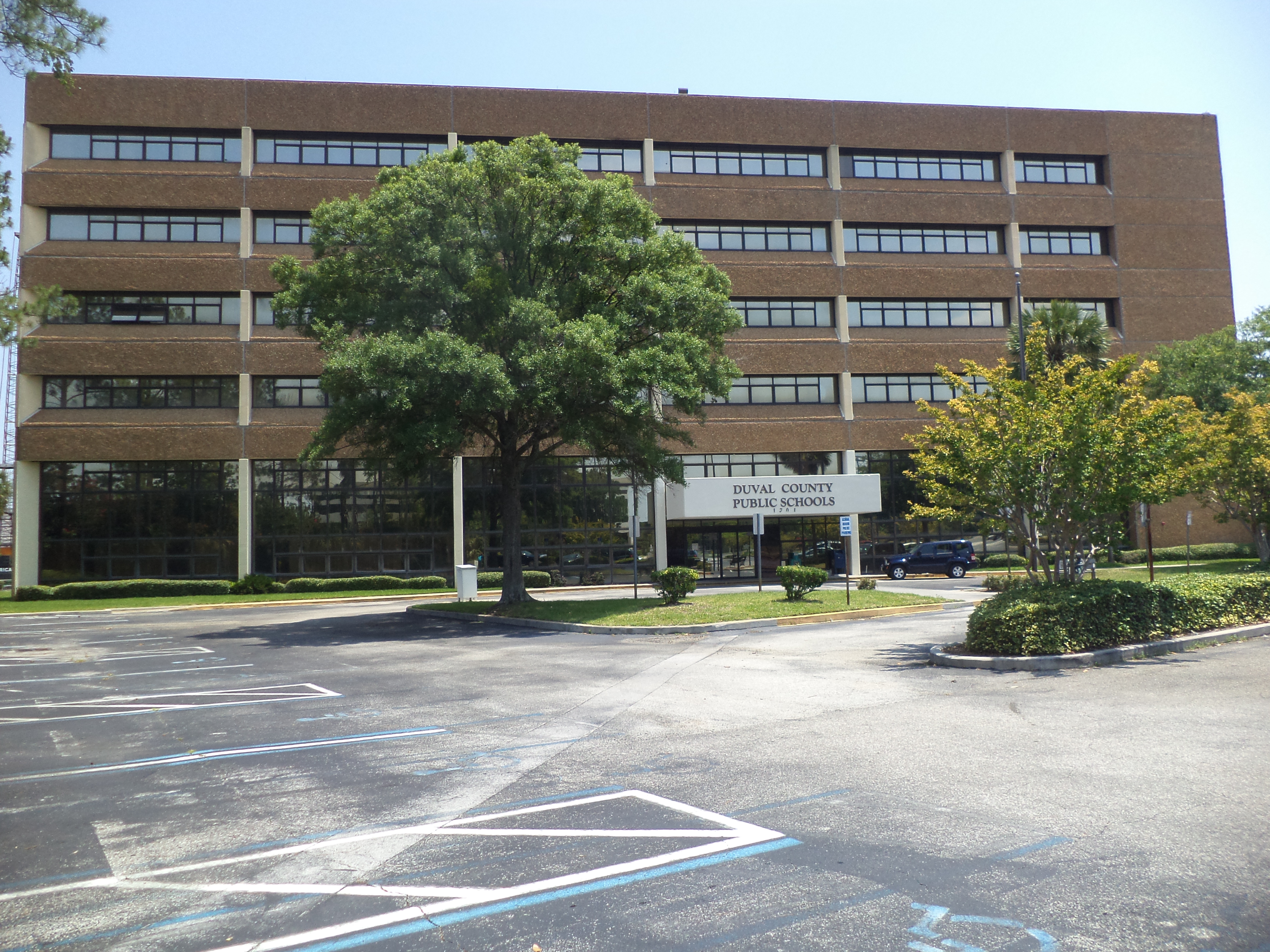
Headquarters

Duval County Public Schools (DCPS) is the public school district that serves the families and children residing in the urban, suburban, and rural areas of the City of Jacksonville and Duval County, Florida. As of 2015, the district had an enrollment of over 130,000 students, making it the 20th largest school district in the United States, and the 6th largest school district in Florida. The district's 196 schools are traditional neighborhood and magnet schools, charter schools, and alternative schools, all of which serve students of various needs.

The district is managed by the Duval County School Board and the Superintendent, Christopher Bernier. Current Duval County School Board members are Anthony Ricardo, District 1; Vice Chairman April Carney, District 2; Cindy Pearson, District 3; Darryl Willie, District 4; Reginald K. Blount, District 5; Chairman Charlotte Joyce, District 6; and Melody A. Bolduc, District 7.

DCPS has achieved an overall ranking of “B,” according to the Florida Department of Education's school grade system, which is based on the New Florida Standards and Florida Standard Assessments (FSA) test results.

Its boundaries parallel those of the county.

== History ==
In the spring of 1864, J.M. Hawks opened the first free public school in the state, located in Jacksonville. The school was later branded as the Stanton Normal Institute in 1868, with a student body of 400. Duval County paved the way for public education in Florida by establishing the first stand-alone high school in 1877, and the first large-scale public school transportation system in 1898.

== Leadership ==
=== Duval County School Board ===
Duval County Public Schools is governed by the Duval County School Board, a body of seven elected officers, each board member representing a particular geographic area. School Board districts are somewhat analogous to City Council districts in that there are two council districts in each school board district. Board members are elected every four years with two-term limits, with Districts 4 through 7 elected during midterm election cycles (next in 2026) and Districts 1 through 3 elected during presidential cycles (next in 2028).

=== Offices ===
The district's administrative offices are primarily located on the south bank of the St. Johns River in a six-story building at 1701 Prudential Drive. The building was constructed in 1980 and occupied since 1981. The structure is 45-years old and yearly maintenance exceeds $500,000. Since 2005, the district has explored opportunities to leave Prudential Drive. Its sale would allow for a larger, modern headquarters and generate funds for school repairs and replenish the capital reserve fund. It would also support downtown revitalization efforts.

=== Superintendents ===
Name	Years
2024-present	Christopher Bernier
2023-2024	Dana Kriznar
2018–2023	Diana Greene
2017–2018	Patricia Willis
2012–2017	Nikolai Vitti
2007–2012	Ed Pratt-Dannals
2005–2007	Joseph Wise
1998–2005	John Fryer
1989–1997	Larry Zenke
1976–1989	Herb Sang
1974–1976	John Gunning
1969–1974	Cecil Hardesty
1957–1969	Ishmael "Ish" Brant
1953–1957	Iva T. Sprinkle
1941–1953	Daniel Boyd
1933–1941	Robert C. Marshall
1928–1933	R. B. Rutherford
1924–1928	G. Elmer Wilbur

== Schools ==
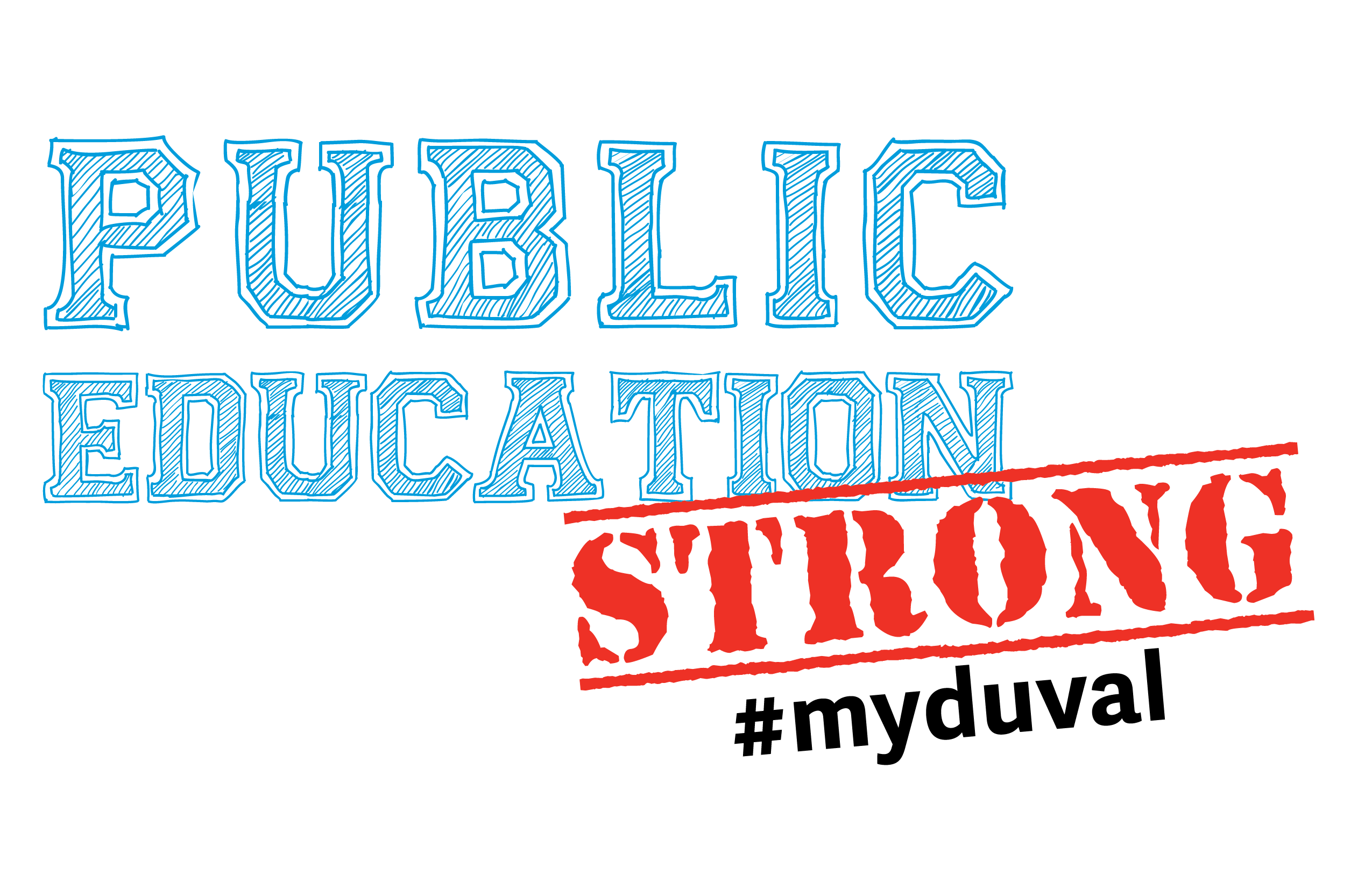

DCPS has 163 regular-attendance schools as of the 2015-16 school year: 102 elementary schools, 24 middle schools, 1 K-6 school, 2 K-8 schools, 2 6-12 schools and 19 high schools. The district also has an adult education system through its Bridge to Success program and Parent Academy, six dedicated ESE schools, as well as a hospital/homebound program, virtual school, and six alternative education centers.

DCPS has used an attendance model of Kindergarten through Grade 5 for elementary schools, Grades 6-8 for middle school and Grades 9-12 for high school since 1991. Before then, Grade 6 was part of elementary school and Grade 9 was part of middle school (called Junior High in DCPS prior to 1988). Pre-Kindergarten education is available to all children from the age of 4 through the Early Learning Coalition of Duval's Voluntary Pre-Kindergarten Program.

DCPS has a wide variety of programs available to students within the district, and schools are categorized as either neighborhood, choice, or magnet schools.

=== Magnet & School Choice ===
All DCPS schools offer at least one choice program, special program, or acceleration program to students. The majority of schools in Duval County are boundary-based and serve students residing within that boundary. Some schools, such as non-dedicated magnet schools serve both neighborhood students as well as students residing outside the school's specified boundary, who are selected via lottery. In February 2016, Duval County Public Schools received a 1.2 million dollar School Improvement Grant for use towards the development of STEM labs in 11 Title-1 schools.

A total of 64 schools offer magnet programs. In addition to the required courses, offer a theme or focus that allows students to explore a special interest, talent or skill in fields such as the arts, aviation, culinary skills, language, law & legal occupations, mathematics, public service, science and technology. Duval County Public Schools contains both dedicated magnets, which do not have set boundaries, and non-dedicated magnets, which are neighborhood schools that also have magnet programs.

=== Charter schools ===
Duval County also contains 34 charter schools. These schools are located within the boundaries of Duval County, and operate under a state sanctioned contract with Duval County Public Schools. While publicly funded, DCPS does not oversee the daily operations and governance of charter schools. In 2024, 91% of traditional or boundary schools performed at the A, B, or C grade, while 78% of charter schools in Duval County scored an A, B, or C grade.

=== School standings ===
In 2015, Stanton College Preparatory School and Paxon School for Advanced Studies were named of the top 25 most challenging high schools in the United States.

Newsweek also publishes a "Catching Up" list of 33 disadvantaged schools nationwide that challenge their students to participate in Advanced Placement programs which offer better instruction and a stimulating curriculum designed to improve academic skills and prepare for college. Because fewer than 10% of those sitting for the exams actually pass, the schools are excluded from the Best High Schools list. For 2010, six of the top 11 schools and twelve of the top 22 were located in Jacksonville:

1.	Riverside
2.	Baldwin (in Baldwin, Florida)
8.	Wolfson
9.	Terry Parker
10.	A. Philip Randolph
11.	Ribault

12.	First Coast
15.	Ed White
18.	Peterson Academy of Technology
19.	Raines
20.	Westside
22.	Jackson

In 2007, the district instituted the Educators of Change program to identify future teachers among professionals and other individuals who have achieved success outside of the education field.

On August 23, 2010, Atlantic Coast High School opened for the 2010-2011 school year. It was the first new public high school built in the county since 1990 and cost $78 million. The school was constructed primarily to relieve overcrowding at the two largest high schools in Duval County, Sandalwood and Mandarin.

==== Student enrollment ====
128,702

Elementary - 56,668

Middle - 21,138

High - 30,455

Exceptional Schools - 1,441

Virtual School - 303

Alternative Schools -2,319

Charter Schools - 11,951

Graduation Rate: 78.8%

==== Student ethnicity ====
African American- 43%

Caucasian - 34%

Hispanic - 13%

Multiracial - 5%

Asian - 5%

American Indian/Alaskan Native - <1%

== Controversies ==
On April 13, 2013, it was reported that towards the end of 2012, a teacher at Cedar Hills Elementary School had students in a 4th grade class write notes stating, "I am willing to give up some of my constitutional rights in order to be safer or more secure." The students were then told to sign the notes. Aaron Harvey, a father of one of the students, found his child's note, written in crayon, and brought it to public attention. In response, Nikolai Vitti, then the superintendent of Duval County Public Schools, stated "The Justice Teaching activity on constitutional rights that was conducted at Cedar Hills Elementary School is consistent with our efforts to broaden civics-based education and develop critical thinking skills among our students. The lesson builds awareness of First Amendment rights through a partnership with an association of local attorneys. Our possible concern rests with a follow-up activity that may have been conducted after the lesson."

== Renaming ==
Following a petition with 160,000 signatures, Nathan Bedford Forrest High School (1959), originally an all-white school named in protest against school desegregation, renamed Westside High School in 2014 after decades of controversy.

- Robert E. Lee High School was changed to Riverside High School
- Joseph Finegan Elementary School was changed to Anchor Academy
- Stonewall Jackson Elementary School was changed to Hidden Oaks Elementary School
- J. E. B. Stuart Middle School was changed to Westside Middle School
- Kirby-Smith Middle School was changed to Springfield Middle School
- Jefferson Davis Middle School was changed to Charger Academy

== See also ==
- List of schools in Duval County, Florida
