= Frank H. Peterson Academies of Technology =

Coordinates: 30.264520°N 81.768807°W

- Motto: “Activate Your Future”
- Type: High School
- Established: 1969
- Principal: Jessica Mastromatto
- Administrative staff: 54.00 (FTE)
- Students: 1,167 (2024-2025)
- Location: Jacksonville, Florida, USA
- Campus: Urban
- Colors: Blue and Silver
- Nicknames: Frank H., FHP, Peterson, Peterson Academy
- Mascot: Silver Eagles
- Website: dcps.duvalschools.org/o/fhp

Frank H. Peterson Academies of Technology is a public, magnet high school located in Jacksonville, Florida. The school encompasses seven National Model Academies based around Arts and Technology-based programs, such as agriscience and veterinary, automotive technology, aviation and aerospace technology, communications and digital arts, cosmetology, culinary arts, early childhood education, and robotics and manufacturing.

Students at Peterson earn an Industry Certificate of Completion as well as a High School Diploma. Frank H. Peterson is a Duval County Career and College Preparatory High School offering advanced placement courses.

Academies at Frank H. Peterson include:

Agriscience and Veterinary Academy: A science-centric academy with an emphasis on cellular biology and genetics. Students in the Agriscience and Vet Assisting academy are prepared for a career in agriculture and veterinary sciences.

Automotive Technology Academy: Automotive maintenance, repair, collision repair, and refinishing.

Aviation Academy: Aircraft design, maintenance, flight technology, and engineering. Student success is measured by a passing score on the FAA private pilot exam and the aviation maintenance General I exam.

Communications Academy: TV production, web design, commercial and graphic arts, digital media

Cosmetology Academy: The Cosmetology department teaches cosmetology skills - hair cutting, make-up, waxing, and all the basics in salon care.

Culinary Arts Academy: The Culinary Arts Academy teaches students food service, food preparation, and restaurant hospitality.

Early Childhood Education Academy: This academy is a certified national career academy that provides students with dual enrollment at FSCJ, Department of Children Certification, CPR, and first aid training. Students are prepared to achieve state certification in infant, toddler, preschool, school age, and special needs.

Robotics and Manufacturing Academy: The robotics academy provides students with principles and applications of robotics engineering, advanced manufacturing technology, and applied robotics.
