= Jean Ribault High School =

American public high school

Coordinates: 30.390038°N 81.707931°W

Location
- 3701 Winton Drive; Jacksonville, Florida; USA

Information
- Type: Public school
- Motto: Fight On
- Established: 1957
- Principal: Gregory D. Bostic
- Teaching staff: 59.00 (FTE)
- Enrollment: 1,331 (2023–2024)
- Student to teacher ratio: 22.56
- Campus: Urban
- Colors: Columbia Blue & White
- Mascot: Mighty Trojan
- Nickname: Ribault or Bault

Jean Ribault High School is a public high school located in North Jacksonville, Florida. It is part of Duval County Public Schools.

== Improvement ==
Ribault was one of 16 schools nationwide selected by the College Board for inclusion in the EXCELerator School Improvement Model program beginning the 2007–2008 school year. The project was funded by the Bill & Melinda Gates Foundation.

== Athletics ==
- The boys basketball team has won 4 State championships (1989, 1990, 1994, 1995).
- 3rd Most Tournament Games Played 163––Miami, 123 wins, 40 losses. 125––Malone, 87 wins, 38 losses. 105––Ribault (Jacksonville), 74 wins, 31 losses
- 3rd Most Tournament Games Won 123––Miami, 163 games. 87––Malone, 125 games. 74––Ribault (Jacksonville), 105 games
- The girls' basketball team has won 12 State championships (1988, 1993, 1994, 1999, 2000, 2001, 2002, 2003, 2013, 2014, 2016 and 2017), the highest total in the state. The team also has the highest state totals for consecutive championships (5), tournament appearances, consecutive appearances, tournament games played, and tournament games won. In 2016 the Lady Trojans won the 2016 National High School Invitational.
- The baseball team won the State championship in 1968.
- The boys' cross country team won the State championship in 1961.
- The boys' track and field team won the State championship in 1979 and 1991.
- The girls' track and field team won the State championship in 1976, 1977, 1990, 1992, and 1993.
- The Trojan Football team has made 12 appearances in the FHSAA Playoffs and have won numerous District Titles. The Trojan football team also plays in the Northwest Classic Football Game against arch rival William M. Raines High School each year in November.

== Notable alumni ==
- Mike Campbell, musician, guitarist, Tom Petty and the Heartbreakers. Fleetwood Mac
- Chandra Cheeseborough, Olympic champion sprinter in National Track and Field Hall of Fame
- Laveranues Coles, wide receiver, Washington Redskins, New York Jets
- Leon Gonzalez, wide receiver, Dallas Cowboys, Atlanta Falcons
- Keonta Jenkins, linebacker for the Buffalo Bills
- Jakob Johnson, football player for the Houston Texans
- Kelvin Martin, wide receiver, Dallas Cowboys
- Longineu Parsons II, trumpeter, associate professor of music at Florida A&M University
- James F. Rinehart, dean at College of Arts and Sciences, Troy University
- Howard Smothers, football player, selected by Philadelphia Eagles with 248th pick in 1995 NFL Draft
- Travis L. Taylor, wide receiver, member of the Super Bowl champion Baltimore Ravens
- Chris Terry, offensive tackle, Kansas City Chiefs
- Butch Trucks, musician, drummer, The Allman Brothers Band
- Erica White, professional women's basketball player
- Naz Worthen, football, track and field All-American triple jumper, 60th pick in 1989 NFL draft by KC Chiefs out of NC State Univ
