= 2001–02 NFL playoffs =

American football tournament

- Dates: January 12 – February 3, 2002
- Season: 2001
- Teams: 12
- Games played: 11
- Super Bowl XXXVI site: Louisiana Superdome; New Orleans, Louisiana
- Defending champions: Baltimore Ravens
- Champion: New England Patriots (1st title)
- Runner-up: St. Louis Rams
- Conference runners-up: Philadelphia Eagles; Pittsburgh Steelers
NFL playoffs
← 2000–01	2002–03 →

The National Football League playoffs for the 2001 season began on January 12, 2002. The postseason tournament concluded with the New England Patriots defeating the St. Louis Rams in Super Bowl XXXVI, 20–17, on February 3, at the Louisiana Superdome in New Orleans, Louisiana.

Until the 2020 season, this was the last season that three wild card teams qualified for the playoffs in each conference, and the last time a wild card team from each conference hosted a postseason game. The addition of the Houston Texans to the league in 2002 led to a realignment to eight divisions. The number of playoff berths remained six per conference, meaning one wild card berth per conference was eliminated and there would be no more meetings between wild card teams in the first round. As was the case prior to 2002, division champions retain priority for higher seeding and home field advantage regardless of records. Under the 2002 system, the only way two wild card teams in the same conference could meet in the playoffs would be for both teams to each win two road games to advance to the conference championship game hosted by the fifth seed, which never occurred. Under the current playoff format, wild card qualifiers can meet in any playoff round except the wild card round.

== Participants ==
Within each conference, the three division winners and the three non-division winners with the best overall regular season records qualified for the playoffs. The three division winners were seeded 1–3 based on the overall won-lost-tied record, and the three wild card teams were seeded 4–6. The NFL did not use a fixed bracket playoff system, and there were no restrictions regarding teams from the same division matching up in any round. In the first round, dubbed the wild-card playoffs or wild-card weekend, the third-seeded division winner hosted the sixth seed wild card, and the fourth seed hosted the fifth. The 1 and 2 seeds from each conference received a first-round bye. In the second round, the divisional playoffs, the number 1 seed hosted the worst-remaining seed from the first round (seed 4, 5, or 6), while the number 2 seed played the other team (seed 3, 4, or 5). The two winning teams from each conference's divisional playoff games then meet in the respective AFC and NFC Conference Championship games, hosted by the higher seed. Although the Super Bowl, the championship round of the playoffs, was played at a neutral site, the designated home team was based on an annual rotation by conference.

Playoff seeds
Seed	AFC	NFC
1	Pittsburgh Steelers (Central winner)	St. Louis Rams (West winner)
2	New England Patriots (East winner)	Chicago Bears (Central winner)
3	Oakland Raiders (West winner)	Philadelphia Eagles (East winner)
4	Miami Dolphins (wild card)	Green Bay Packers (wild card)
5	Baltimore Ravens (wild card)	San Francisco 49ers (wild card)
6	New York Jets (wild card)	Tampa Bay Buccaneers (wild card)

== Bracket ==
Jan 12 – Veterans Stadium	Jan 19 – Soldier Field
6	Tampa Bay	9
3	Philadelphia	33
3	Philadelphia	31	Jan 27 – Edward Jones Dome
2	Chicago	19
NFC
Jan 13 – Lambeau Field	3	Philadelphia	24
Jan 20 – Edward Jones Dome
1	St. Louis	29
5	San Francisco	15	NFC Championship
4	Green Bay	17
4	Green Bay	25	Feb 3 – Louisiana Superdome
1	St. Louis	45
Wild Card playoffs
Divisional playoffs
Jan 12 – Network Associates Coliseum	N1	St. Louis	17
Jan. 19 – Foxboro Stadium
A2	New England	20
6	NY Jets	24	Super Bowl XXXVI
3	Oakland	13
3	Oakland	38	Jan 27 – Heinz Field
2	New England	16*
AFC
Jan 13 – Pro Player Stadium	2	New England	24
Jan 20 – Heinz Field
1	Pittsburgh	17
5	Baltimore	20	AFC Championship
5	Baltimore	10
4	Miami	3
1	Pittsburgh	27

* Indicates OT victory

== Schedule ==
The September 11, 2001 terrorist attacks led the league to postpone its September 16–17 games and play them a week after the scheduled conclusion of the regular season. This caused the playoffs and Super Bowl to be delayed by one week. This thus marked the first time in NFL history that the Super Bowl was played in February. No bye week was originally scheduled between the conference championships and the Super Bowl this season, so the NFL had to work diligently to get the final game in New Orleans rescheduled, including having alternative plans to host the Super Bowl in another city.

For the first time, the NFL scheduled prime time playoff games for the first two rounds in an attempt to attract more television viewers. Saturday wild card and divisional playoff games were moved from 12:30 p.m. and 4 p.m. EST to 4:30 p.m. and 8 p.m., respectively. Concurrently, the league abandoned its general practice of scheduling colder, northern playoff games for daylight hours only; any stadium, regardless of evening January temperatures, could host prime time playoff games.

In the United States, ABC broadcast the first two Wild Card playoff games, then CBS broadcast the rest of the AFC playoff games. Fox televised the rest of the NFC games and Super Bowl XXXVI.

Round	Away team	Score	Home team	Date	Kickoff (ET / UTC-5)	TV	Viewers (millions)	TV Rating
Wild-card round	Tampa Bay Buccaneers	9–31	Philadelphia Eagles	January 12, 2002	4:30 p.m.	ABC	N/A	13.1
Wild-card round	New York Jets	24–38	Oakland Raiders	January 12, 2002	8:00 p.m.	ABC	22.0	13.9
Wild-card round	San Francisco 49ers	15–25	Green Bay Packers	January 13, 2002	12:30 p.m.	Fox	N/A	16.8
Wild-card round	Baltimore Ravens	20–3	Miami Dolphins	January 13, 2002	4:00 p.m.	CBS	N/A	16.8
Divisional round	Philadelphia Eagles	33–19	Chicago Bears	January 19, 2002	4:30 p.m.	Fox	26.6	17.1
Divisional round	Oakland Raiders	13–16 (OT)	New England Patriots	January 19, 2002	8:00 p.m.	CBS	28.7	17.4
Divisional round	Baltimore Ravens	10–27	Pittsburgh Steelers	January 20, 2002	12:30 p.m.	CBS	27.0	17.9
Divisional round	Green Bay Packers	17–45	St. Louis Rams	January 20, 2002	4:00 p.m.	Fox	30.8	19.5
Conference championships	New England Patriots	24–17	Pittsburgh Steelers	January 27, 2002	12:30 p.m.	CBS	33.3	21.2
Conference championships	Philadelphia Eagles	24–29	St. Louis Rams	January 27, 2002	4:00 p.m.	Fox	37.4	22.7
Super Bowl XXXVI Louisiana Superdome New Orleans, Louisiana	St. Louis Rams	17–20	New England Patriots	February 3, 2002	6:30 p.m.	Fox	86.8	40.4

== Wild-card round ==
=== Saturday, January 12, 2002 ===
==== NFC: Philadelphia Eagles 31, Tampa Bay Buccaneers 9 ====
Tampa Bay Buccaneers vs. Philadelphia Eagles – Game summary

Quarter	1	2	3	4	Total
Buccaneers	3	6	0	0	9
Eagles	3	14	7	7	31

at Veterans Stadium, Philadelphia, Pennsylvania

- Game time: 4:30 p.m. EST
- Game weather: 46 °F (8 °C), clear
- Game attendance: 65,846
- Referee: Larry Nemmers
- TV announcers (ABC): Mike Patrick (play-by-play), Joe Theismann, Paul Maguire (color commentators), and Suzy Kolber (sideline reporter)

Game information

First quarter

- TB – Martín Gramática 36-yard field goal, 10:48. Buccaneers 3–0. Drive: 7 plays, 21 yards, 3:10.
- PHI – David Akers 26-yard field goal, 6:18. Tied 3–3. Drive: 7 plays, 58 yards, 4:30.

Second quarter

- PHI – Chad Lewis 16-yard pass from Donovan McNabb (David Akers kick), 12:17. Eagles 10–3. Drive: 5 plays, 73 yards, 2:33.
- TB – Martín Gramática 32-yard field goal, 6:13. Eagles 10–6. Drive: 10 plays, 65 yards, 6:04.
- PHI – Duce Staley 23-yard pass from Donovan McNabb (David Akers kick), 0:35. Eagles 17–6. Drive: 6 plays, 31 yards, 1:11.
- TB – Martín Gramática 27-yard field goal, 0:00. Eagles 17–9. Drive: 5 plays, 53 yards, 0:35.

Third quarter

- PHI – Correll Buckhalter 25-yard run (David Akers kick), 6:57. Eagles 24–9. Drive: 6 plays, 60 yards, 2:30.

Fourth quarter

- PHI – Damon Moore 59-yard interception return (David Akers kick), 2:08. Eagles 31–9.

Top passers

- TB – Brad Johnson – 22/36, 202 yards, 4 INT
- PHI – Donovan McNabb – 16/25, 194 yards, 2 TD, INT

Top rushers

- TB – Mike Alstott – 12 rushes, 32 yards
- PHI – Donovan McNabb – 4 rushes, 57 yards

Top receivers

- TB – Keyshawn Johnson – 3 receptions, 75 yards
- PHI – Todd Pinkston – 5 receptions, 62 yards

Eagles quarterback Donovan McNabb threw for 194 yards and two touchdowns, while also rushing for 54 yards, as Philadelphia dominated Tampa Bay from start to finish. Bucs quarterback Brad Johnson was intercepted four times, twice by Damon Moore. It was the second consecutive season in which Philadelphia eliminated Tampa Bay from the playoffs during the wild card round, and two days later, Buccaneers coach Tony Dungy was fired.

On the Eagles first drive of the game, Buccaneers safety Dexter Jackson intercepted a pass from McNabb and returned it nine yards to the Eagles 36-yard line, setting up a 36-yard field goal from Martín Gramática. But McNabb made up for his mistake with a 39-yard run on third down and 5 on Philadelphia's ensuing possession, setting up a field goal for David Akers that tied the game, 3–3. In the second quarter, McNabb completed all four of his passes for 70 yards on a 73-yard drive, including a 41-yard completion to Todd Pinkston, that ended with a 16-yard touchdown pass to tight end Chad Lewis. Tampa responded with a 10-play, 65-yard drive, but once again could not dent the end zone and had to settle for another Gramatica field goal, cutting their deficit to 10–6. Later in the quarter, Eagles punter Sean Landeta pinned the Buccaneers back at their own 5-yard line and Tampa Bay could not get a first down with their next drive. After receiving Mark Royals' short 28-yard punt at the Buccaneers 31-yard line, McNabb threw a 23-yard touchdown pass to Duce Staley with 35 seconds left in the half. But Tampa Bay managed to respond with Gramatica's third field goal before halftime, set up by a 46-yard reception from Keyshawn Johnson, cutting their deficit to 17–9.

But Tampa Bay was completely dominated in the second half. Moore recorded his first interception from Brad Johnson at the Eagles 38-yard line on the Buccaneers opening drive of the third quarter. Later on, the Eagles drove 60 yards in six plays and scored on a 25-yard touchdown run from rookie Correll Buckhalter. Johnson tried to rally his team back with a pair of drives deep into Eagles territory, but both of them were ended with interceptions. First, cornerback Troy Vincent picked off a pass from Johnson in the end zone with 4:09 left in the third quarter. Then late in the fourth quarter, safety Brian Dawkins intercepted Johnson on Philadelphia's 3-yard line. Following a punt, Moore put the game away by recording his second interception and returning it 59 yards for a touchdown.

This was the third postseason meeting between the Buccaneers and Eagles. Both teams previously split the two prior meetings.

Previous playoff games
Tied 1–1 in all-time playoff games

1979

Philadelphia Eagles 17 @ Tampa Bay Buccaneers 24

1979 NFC Divisional playoffs

2000

Tampa Bay Buccaneers 3 @ Philadelphia Eagles 21

2000 NFC Wild Card playoffs

==== AFC: Oakland Raiders 38, New York Jets 24 ====
New York Jets vs. Oakland Raiders – Game summary

Quarter	1	2	3	4	Total
Jets	0	3	7	14	24
Raiders	6	10	0	22	38

at Network Associates Coliseum, Oakland, California

- Game time: 8:00 p.m. EST/5:00 p.m. PST
- Game weather: 53 °F (12 °C), clear
- Game attendance: 61,503
- Referee: Dick Hantak
- TV announcers (ABC): Al Michaels (play-by-play), Dan Fouts, Dennis Miller (color commentators), Melissa Stark, and Eric Dickerson (sideline reporters)

Game information

First quarter

- OAK – Sebastian Janikowski 21-yard field goal, 8:26. Raiders 3–0. Drive: 12 plays, 74 yards, 6:34.
- OAK – Sebastian Janikowski 41-yard field goal, 0:44. Raiders 6–0. Drive: 7 plays, 43 yards, 2:23.

Second quarter

- NYJ – John Hall 45-yard field goal, 12:45. Raiders 6–3. Drive: 6 plays, 21 yards, 2:59.
- OAK – Sebastian Janikowski 45-yard field goal, 6:45. Raiders 9–3. Drive: 10 plays, 43 yards, 6:00.
- OAK – Tim Brown 2-yard pass from Rich Gannon (Sebastian Janikowski kick), 0:22. Raiders 16–3. Drive: 7 plays, 66 yards, 2:43.

Third quarter

- NYJ – Wayne Chrebet 17-yard pass from Vinny Testaverde (John Hall kick), 11:36. Raiders 16–10. Drive: 8 plays, 72 yards, 3:24.

Fourth quarter

- OAK – Zack Crockett 2-yard run (Charlie Garner run), 14:57. Raiders 24–10. Drive: 4 plays, 55 yards, 1:33.
- NYJ – Richie Anderson 3-yard pass from Vinny Testaverde (John Hall kick), 10:18. Raiders 24–17. Drive: 10 plays, 64 yards, 4:39.
- OAK – Jerry Rice 21-yard pass from Rich Gannon (Sebastian Janikowski kick), 5:53. Raiders 31–17. Drive: 7 plays, 68 yards, 4:25.
- NYJ – Wayne Chrebet 4-yard pass from Testaverde (John Hall kick), 1:52. Raiders 31–24. Drive: 9 plays, 75 yards, 4:01.
- OAK – Charlie Garner 80-yard run (Sebastian Janikowski kick), 1:27. Raiders 38–24. Drive: 3 plays, 79 yards, 0:25.

Top passers

- NYJ – Vinny Testaverde – 26/40, 268 yards, 3 TD
- OAK – Rich Gannon – 23/29, 294 yards, 2 TD

Top rushers

- NYJ – Curtis Martin – 16 rushes, 106 yards
- OAK – Charlie Garner – 15 rushes, 158 yards, TD

Top receivers

- NYJ – Laveranues Coles – 8 receptions, 123 yards
- OAK – Jerry Rice – 9 receptions, 183 yards, TD

The Raiders defeated the Jets in a high scoring shootout, outgaining them in total yards 502 to 410, and holding them off in a wild, 36-point fourth quarter. Quarterback Rich Gannon completed 23 of 29 passes for 294 yards and two touchdowns. 39-year-old wide receiver Jerry Rice had a superb performance, catching nine passes for 183 yards and a touchdown. His nine receptions tied a franchise playoff record held by Cliff Branch and Fred Biletnikoff. Running back Charlie Garner ran 80 yards for a touchdown to clinch the game with 1:27 remaining. He finished the game with 156 rushing yards on just 15 carries, along with three receptions for 26 yards. Jets quarterback Vinny Testaverde threw for 277 yards and three touchdowns. Running back Curtis Martin added 106 rushing yards, while receiver Laveranues Coles caught eight passes for 123 yards.

Following a missed field goal by Jets kicker John Hall on the opening drive, Oakland kicker Sebastian Janikowski made two field goals to give his team a 6–0 first quarter lead. In the second quarter, Hall and Janikowski both made field goals before Oakland scored the first touchdown of the game on a 66-yard drive that ended with Tim Brown's 2-yard touchdown reception to make the score 16–3 with 22 seconds left in the half.

Early in the third quarter, Testaverde narrowed the score to 16–10 with a 17-yard touchdown pass to Wayne Chrebet. Later in the quarter, Raiders safety Johnnie Harris stripped the ball from fullback Richie Anderson and defensive tackle Grady Jackson recovered the ball for Oakland on their own 45-yard line. After a short run by Garner, Gannon's 47-yard completion to Rice moved the ball to the Jets 4-yard line. A few plays later, fullback Zack Crockett scored a 2-yard touchdown run on the first play of the fourth quarter, giving the Raiders a 24–10 lead. But instead of putting the game away, Crockett's score set off a wild scoring explosion from both teams, who ended up combining for 36 points in the final quarter as Testaverde desperately tried to rally his team back.

The Jets responded by driving 64 yards in 10 plays and scoring with Testaverde's 4-yard touchdown pass to Anderson. But Oakland stormed back with a 68-yard, seven play scoring drive. After a 21-yard completion to Rice and a 20-yard strike to Jerry Porter on third down and 8, Gannon threw a 21-yard touchdown pass to Rice with 5:53 left in regulation. Testaverde once again responded, completing a four-yard touchdown pass to Chrebet on fourth down and goal to make it 31–24 with 1:57 left. Because the Jets had two timeouts left, coach Herm Edwards decided not to attempt an onside kick. New York's defense managed to stuff running back Tyrone Wheatley on two straight plays, but on third down, Garner took off down the right sideline for an 80-yard touchdown run, the longest in Raiders postseason history.

This was the third postseason meeting between the Jets and Raiders. New York won both prior meetings.

Previous playoff games
New York leads 2–0 in all-time playoff games

1968

Oakland Raiders 23 @ New York Jets 27

1968 AFL Championship Game

1982

New York Jets 17 @ Los Angeles Raiders 14

1982 AFC second round playoffs

=== Sunday, January 13, 2002 ===
==== NFC: Green Bay Packers 25, San Francisco 49ers 15 ====
San Francisco 49ers vs. Green Bay Packers – Game summary

Quarter	1	2	3	4	Total
49ers	0	7	0	8	15
Packers	6	0	9	10	25

at Lambeau Field, Green Bay, Wisconsin

- Game time: 12:30 p.m. EST/11:30 a.m. CST
- Game weather: 28 °F (−2 °C), sunny
- Game attendance: 59,825
- Referee: Bernie Kukar
- TV announcers (Fox): Pat Summerall (play-by-play), John Madden (color commentator), and Ron Pitts (sideline reporter)

Game information

First quarter

- GB – Antonio Freeman 5-yard pass from Brett Favre (kick blocked), 7:03. Packers 6–0. Drive: 10 plays, 43 yards, 4:55.

Second quarter

- SF – Garrison Hearst 2-yard run (José Cortez kick), 0:15. 49ers 7–6. Drive: 15 plays, 86 yards, 6:51.

Third quarter

- GB – Ryan Longwell 26-yard field goal, 8:56. Packers 9–7. Drive: 12 plays, 72 yards, 5:56.
- GB – Bubba Franks 14-yard pass from Brett Favre (pass failed), 3:26. Packers 15–7. Drive: 4 plays, 81 yards, 1:54.

Fourth quarter

- SF – Tai Streets 14-yard pass from Jeff Garcia (Tai Streets pass from Jeff Garcia), 12:00. Tied 15–15. Drive: 6 plays, 61 yards, 3:26.
- GB – Ryan Longwell 45-yard field goal, 7:11. Packers 18–15. Drive: 10 plays, 49 yards, 4:49.
- GB – Ahman Green 9-yard run (Ryan Longwell kick), 1:55. Packers 25–15. Drive: 8 plays, 93 yards, 3:11.

Top passers

- SF – Jeff Garcia – 22/32, 233 yards, TD, INT
- GB – Brett Favre – 22/29, 269 yards, 2 TD, INT

Top rushers

- SF – Garrison Hearst – 13 rushes, 42 yards, TD
- GB – Ahman Green – 21 rushes, 86 yards, TD

Top receivers

- SF – J. J. Stokes – 4 receptions, 52 yards
- GB – Antonio Freeman – 6 receptions, 84 yards, TD

The 2001 NFC wild card game between the San Francisco 49ers and Green Bay Packers shares the title of the best wild card round matchup by record (along with the 1999 AFC Wild Card, between the 11–5 Buffalo Bills and 13–3 Tennessee Titans, and 2020 AFC Wild Card between the 11–5 Indianapolis Colts and 13–3 Buffalo Bills), with a combined mark of 24–8. The game was also the only wild card game in the sixteen game era to feature two teams with twelve or more regular season wins, as both teams finished with a 12–4 mark. In frigid temperatures, the 49ers came into Lambeau Field and stood toe-to-toe with the Packers for most of the afternoon until being put away by a superb second half performance from Packers quarterback Brett Favre.

Favre completed six of eight passes for 43 yards in the first half, including a 5-yard touchdown pass to Antonio Freeman that gave the Packers a 6–0 lead after San Francisco defensive tackle Dana Stubblefield blocked the extra point. The Packers defense limited San Francisco to just 53 yards and a blocked field goal on their first four drives, but the 49ers closed out the half with a 15-play, 86-yard drive that took seven minutes off the clock. Quarterback Jeff Garcia completed six of nine passes for 61 yards on the drive, and running back Garrison Hearst capped it off with a 2-yard touchdown run to give his team a 7–6 halftime lead. It marked the first time Green Bay had ever trailed at the end of the first half in a home playoff game since the famous Ice Bowl in 1967.

However, Favre dominated the 49ers defense in the second half, completing 16 of 21 passes for 226 yards and leading his team to four scoring drives. First, he led the Packers 72 yards in 12 plays, completing two passes for 21 yards to Bill Schroeder and a 22-yarder to Freeman en route to a 26-yard field goal by Ryan Longwell. After a San Francisco punt, Favre led his team to the end zone in just three plays, tossing a 12-yard completion to fullback William Henderson, following it up with a 51-yard strike to Corey Bradford, and then finishing the drive with a 19-yard touchdown pass to Bubba Franks with 3:26 left in the third quarter, giving the Packers a 15–7 lead after the 49ers defense tackled Donald Driver short of the end zone on a two-point conversion attempt.

In the fourth quarter, Hearst's 22-yard reception and 10-yard run set up a 14-yard touchdown pass from Garcia to Tai Streets, who also caught a subsequent 2-point conversion pass to tie the game at 15. But Green Bay responded with a 49-yard drive and retook the lead with a 45-yard field goal from Longwell. Then on San Francisco's ensuing possession, cornerback Mike McKenzie deflected a pass from Garcia into the arms of Tyrone Williams for an interception on the Packers 7-yard line. Favre took over from there, leading the Packers on an 8-play 93-yard drive for the game clinching touchdown, featuring two key third down completions by Favre. The first was a 37-yard completion to Freeman on third down and 7. Later, Driver caught a 12-yard pass on the 49ers 9-yard line on third down and 6. On the next play, running back Ahman Green scored on a 9-yard touchdown run with 1:55 left in regulation.

Favre completed 22 of 29 passes for 269 yards, two touchdowns, and an interception. Garcia completed 22 of 32 passes for 233 yards, a touchdown, and an interception.

This was the fifth postseason meeting between the 49ers and Packers. Green Bay previously won three of the four prior meetings.

Previous playoff games
Green Bay leads 3–1 in all-time playoff games

1995

Green Bay Packers 27 @ San Francisco 49ers 17

1995 NFC Divisional playoffs

1996

San Francisco 49ers 14 @ Green Bay Packers 35

1996 NFC Divisional playoffs

1997

Green Bay Packers 23 @ San Francisco 49ers 10

1997 NFC Championship Game

1998

Green Bay Packers 27 @ San Francisco 49ers 30

1998 NFC Wild Card playoffs

==== AFC: Baltimore Ravens 20, Miami Dolphins 3 ====
Baltimore Ravens vs. Miami Dolphins – Game summary

Quarter	1	2	3	4	Total
Ravens	0	7	7	6	20
Dolphins	3	0	0	0	3

at Pro Player Stadium, Miami, Florida

- Game time: 4:00 p.m. EST
- Game weather: 73 °F (23 °C), partly sunny
- Game attendance: 72,251
- Referee: Mike Carey
- TV announcers (CBS): Greg Gumbel (play-by-play), Phil Simms (color commentator), Armen Keteyian, and Bonnie Bernstein (sideline reporters)

Game information

First quarter

- MIA – Olindo Mare 33-yard field goal, 12:46. Dolphins 3–0. Drive: 4 plays, 9 yards, 2:03.

Second quarter

- BAL – Terry Allen 4-yard run (Matt Stover kick), 13:34. Ravens 7–3. Drive: 17 plays, 90 yards, 8:51.

Third quarter

- BAL – Travis Taylor 4-yard pass from Elvis Grbac (Matt Stover kick), 1:20. Ravens 14–3. Drive: 11 plays, 99 yards, 5:42.

Fourth quarter

- BAL – Matt Stover 35-yard field goal, 11:05. Ravens 17–3. Drive: 6 plays, 20 yards, 3:33.
- BAL – Matt Stover 40-yard field goal, 2:01. Ravens 20–3. Drive: 11 plays, 50 yards, 6:33.

Top passers

- BAL – Elvis Grbac – 12/18, 133 yards, TD
- MIA – Jay Fiedler – 15/28, 122 yards, INT

Top rushers

- BAL – Terry Allen – 25 rushes, 109 yards, TD
- MIA – Jay Fiedler – 3 rushes, 16 yards

Top receivers

- BAL – Travis Taylor – 2 receptions, 49 yards, TD
- MIA – Dedric Ward – 5 receptions, 55 yards

The Ravens recorded 222 rushing yards, while limiting the Dolphins to 151 total yards and nine first downs, while forcing three turnovers and three sacks. Baltimore running back Terry Allen ran for 109 yards and a touchdown, while quarterback Elvis Grbac completed 12 of 18 passes for 133 yards and a touchdown. Throughout the day, the Dolphins were unable to move the ball on the ground. Running backs Travis Minor and Lamar Smith were held to a combined total of 20 yards on 11 carries, while quarterback Jay Fiedler ended up as the leading rusher with 16 yards. In contrast, the Ravens called 50 running plays, gained 222 rushing yards, and held the ball for 38 minutes.

The Dolphins' only score was Olindo Mare's 33-yard field goal just two minutes into the game, after linebacker Tommy Hendricks recovered a fumble from Baltimore's Jermaine Lewis on the opening kickoff. In the second quarter, the Ravens finished a 17-play, 90-yard drive with a 4-yard touchdown run from Allen to take a 7–3 lead. Baltimore later had a chance to increase their lead before halftime when linebacker Peter Boulware recovered Minor's fumble on the Dolphins 41-yard line, but their ensuing drive ended without points when Matt Stover missed a 40-yard field goal attempt on the last play of the half.

Later in the game, Grbac led the Ravens on a 99-yard scoring drive, featuring a 45-yard completion to Travis Taylor on third down and 1. Taylor finished the drive with a 4-yard touchdown catch to give the Ravens a 14–3 lead with 1:20 left in the third quarter.

Early in the final quarter, Boulware forced a fumble while sacking Fiedler that Ravens defensive tackle Sam Adams recovered on the Dolphins 37-yard line, leading to Stover's 35-yard field goal with 11:26 left in the game. The Dolphins responded with a drive to the Ravens 41. On first and 10, Fiedler's 40-yard pass to James McKnight at the Ravens 5-yard line bounced off the receiver's shoulder and was intercepted by cornerback Duane Starks, who returned the ball 26 yards to the 28-yard line. Baltimore's offense subsequently drove 50 yards and took 6:30 off the clock, including five carries by Jason Brookins for 36 yards, setting up Stover's second field goal to put the game away.

This was the first postseason meeting between the Ravens and Dolphins.

== Divisional round ==
=== Saturday, January 19, 2002 ===
==== NFC: Philadelphia Eagles 33, Chicago Bears 19 ====
Philadelphia Eagles vs. Chicago Bears – Game summary

Quarter	1	2	3	4	Total
Eagles	6	7	7	13	33
Bears	0	7	7	5	19

at Soldier Field, Chicago, Illinois

- Game time: 4:30 p.m. EST/3:30 p.m. CST
- Game weather: 31 °F (−1 °C), partly cloudy
- Game attendance: 65,028
- Referee: Bill Carollo
- TV announcers (Fox): Dick Stockton (play-by-play), Troy Aikman, Daryl Johnston (color commentators), and Pam Oliver (sideline reporter)

Game information

First quarter

- PHI – David Akers 34-yard field goal, 9:04. Eagles 3–0. Drive: 12 plays, 61 yards, 5:56.
- PHI – David Akers 23-yard field goal, 3:22. Eagles 6–0. Drive: 9 plays, 63 yards, 4:05.

Second quarter

- CHI – Ahmad Merritt 47-yard run (Paul Edinger kick), 5:29. Bears 7–6. Drive: 1 play, 62 yards, 0:15.
- PHI – Cecil Martin 13-yard pass from Donovan McNabb (David Akers kick), 0:14. Eagles 13–7. Drive: 11 plays, 69 yards, 5:15.

Third quarter

- CHI – Jerry Azumah 39-yard interception return (Paul Edinger kick), 12:25. Bears 14–13.
- PHI – Duce Staley 6-yard pass from Donovan McNabb (David Akers kick), 5:55. Eagles 20–14. Drive: 5 plays, 36 yards, 2:36.

Fourth quarter

- CHI – Paul Edinger 38-yard field goal, 14:16. Eagles 20–17. Drive: 11 plays, 44 yards, 6:39.
- PHI – David Akers 40-yard field goal, 8:48. Eagles 23–17. Drive: 11 plays, 45 yards, 5:28.
- PHI – David Akers 46-yard field goal, 6:28. Eagles 26–17. Drive: 4 plays, 7 yards, 2:07.
- PHI – Donovan McNabb 5-yard run (David Akers kick), 3:21. Eagles 33–17. Drive: 3 plays, 20 yards, 0:55.
- CHI – Safety, Sean Landeta ran out of end zone, 0:00. Eagles 33–19.

Top passers

- PHI – Donovan McNabb – 26/40, 262 yards, 2 TD, INT
- CHI – Shane Matthews – 8/17, 66 yards, 2 INT

Top rushers

- PHI – Duce Staley – 18 rushes, 66 yards
- CHI – Ahmad Merritt – 1 rush, 47 yards, TD

Top receivers

- PHI – James Thrash – 7 receptions, 73 yards
- CHI – Dez White – 4 receptions, 30 yards

The Bears surprised everyone by finishing atop the NFC Central with a 13–3 record behind quarterback Jim Miller. But after the Eagles jumped to a 6–0 lead, Miller was taken out of the game in the second quarter with a separated shoulder. Although Miller's replacement, Shane Matthews, led the Bears to a touchdown (a 47-yard reverse by Ahmad Merritt), and Jerry Azumah's 39-yard interception return briefly put the Bears back in the lead early in the second half, the Eagles controlled most of the rest of the game. Matthews threw for only 66 yards and was intercepted twice. Meanwhile, Eagles quarterback Donovan McNabb threw for 262 yards and two touchdowns, and ran for another touchdown.

The Eagles controlled the first quarter, scoring with two field goals by David Akers while holding the Bears to 25 offensive yards and one first down. In the second quarter, Miller led the Bears to Philadelphia's 25-yard line before throwing an interception to safety Damon Moore. On the ensuing interception return, defensive end Hugh Douglas drove Miller to the ground, separating his shoulder and knocking him out of the game. Douglas was later fined $35,000 for the hit. Merritt's 47-yard touchdown run gave the Bears a 7–6 lead with 5:27 left in the quarter. But McNabb led the Eagles back, driving 69 yards in 11 plays, including a 9-yard completion to tight end Jeff Thomason on fourth down and 1 from the Bears 27-yard line. Four plays later, McNabb finished the drive with a 13-yard touchdown pass to fullback Cecil Martin, giving his team a 13–7 lead with just 14 seconds left in the half. The Eagles finished the half with 230 yards and held the ball over 20 minutes, while holding the Bears to 88 yards.

On the first drive of the second half, cornerback R. W. McQuarters deflected a pass from McNabb into the arms of Azumah, who returned it 39 yards for a touchdown to give the Bears a 14–13 lead. Later on, Chicago punter Brad Maynard's 15-yard punt gave the Eagles a first down on the Bears 36-yard line. Following a key 30-yard reception by Thomason on third down and 14, McNabb threw a 6-yard touchdown pass to Duce Staley, giving the Eagles a 20–14 lead with 5:55 left in the third quarter. Chicago responded with an 11-play, 44-yard drive that ended with a field goal from Paul Edinger, but the Eagles struck back with an 11-play drive of their own, driving 45 yards and scoring with Akers' third field goal. Then Autry Denson fumbled the ensuing kickoff and Philadelphia rookie Quinton Caver recovered it, setting up Akers' fourth field goal. McNabb added another touchdown on a 5-yard run with 3:21 left to put the game away, while the Bears only other score was an intentional safety from Eagles punter Sean Landeta on the last play of the game. This game was the last one ever played at the old Soldier Field as the stadium was closed for major renovations, thus marking the Philadelphia Eagles the last team to win at the legendary stadium.

This was the third postseason meeting between the Eagles and Bears. Both teams split the prior two meetings.

Previous playoff games
Tied 1–1 in all-time playoff games

1979

Chicago Bears 17 @ Philadelphia Eagles 27

1979 NFC Wild Card playoffs

1988

Philadelphia Eagles 12 @ Chicago Bears 20

1988 NFC Divisional playoffs

==== AFC: New England Patriots 16, Oakland Raiders 13 (OT) ====
Oakland Raiders vs. New England Patriots – Game summary

Quarter	1	2	3	4	OT	Total
Raiders	0	7	6	0	0	13
Patriots	0	0	3	10	3	16

at Foxboro Stadium, Foxborough, Massachusetts

- Game time: 8:00 p.m. EST
- Game weather: 19 °F (−7 °C), heavy snow
- Game attendance: 60,292
- Referee: Walt Coleman
- TV announcers (CBS): Greg Gumbel (play-by-play), Phil Simms (color commentator), and Armen Keteyian (sideline reporter)

Game information

First quarter

- No scoring plays

Second quarter

- OAK – James Jett 13-yard pass from Rich Gannon (Sebastian Janikowski kick), 12:14. Raiders 7–0. Drive: 8 plays, 50 yards, 3:44.

Third quarter

- NE – Adam Vinatieri 23-yard field goal, 8:39. Raiders 7–3. Drive: 12 plays, 62 yards, 6:21.
- OAK – Sebastian Janikowski 38-yard field goal, 4:14. Raiders 10–3. Drive: 10 plays, 43 yards, 4:25.
- OAK – Sebastian Janikowski 45-yard field goal, 1:41. Raiders 13–3. Drive: 7 plays, 24 yards, 1:38.

Fourth quarter

- NE – Tom Brady 6-yard run (Adam Vinatieri kick), 7:52. Raiders 13–10. Drive: 10 plays, 67 yards, 4:37.
- NE – Adam Vinatieri 45-yard field goal, 0:27. Tied 13–13. Drive: 8 plays, 26 yards, 1:39.

Overtime

- NE – Adam Vinatieri 23-yard field goal, 6:31. Patriots 16–13. Drive: 15 plays, 61 yards, 8:29.

Top passers

- OAK – Rich Gannon – 17/31, 159 yards, TD
- NE – Tom Brady – 32/52, 312 yards, INT

Top rushers

- OAK – Charlie Garner – 17 rushes, 64 yards
- NE – Antowain Smith – 20 rushes, 65 yards

Top receivers

- OAK – Jerry Rice – 4 receptions, 48 yards
- NE – David Patten – 8 receptions, 107 yards

This game has become a part of NFL lore. It was the final contest in the history of Foxboro Stadium, played under heavy snowfall. It is best remembered for a call near the end of the game with Oakland protecting a three-point lead. The referees initially ruled that New England quarterback Tom Brady had fumbled on a pass attempt. Invoking the "tuck rule", where a ball is ruled an incomplete pass after the quarterback starts any forward motion, the referee overturned the decision after reviewing the instant replay, calling the drop an incomplete pass rather than a fumble.

Both teams struggled in the heavy snow storm during the first half, combining for the same number of punts as first downs (11) and converting only one of 13 third downs. However, Raiders quarterback Rich Gannon was efficient, completing 10 of 14 passes for 87 yards. The closest either team would come to scoring in the first quarter would be New England's drive to the Oakland 31-yard line, which ended when Brady threw an incomplete pass on fourth and 2. With 1:12 left in the quarter, a 15-yard fair catch interference penalty against Patriots safety Je'Rod Cherry at the end of Ken Walter's 39-yard punt gave Oakland a first down at midfield, where they drove to a 7–0 lead on Gannon's 13-yard touchdown pass to James Jett. A few plays later, Raiders safety Johnnie Harris intercepted a pass from Brady on the Patriots 41-yard line, but New England's defense managed to force a punt, which would be the final result of every following drive until the end of the half.

In the second half, things began to open up, especially for New England, who almost completely abandoned their running game and relied on Brady. He ended up completing 26 of 39 passes for 238 yards in the second half. On the opening drive of the third quarter, he completed passes to David Patten for gains of 25 and 19 yards as he led the Patriots 62 yards in 12 plays to the Raiders' 5-yard line, where Adam Vinatieri made a 23-yard field goal to make it 7–3. Terry Kirby returned the ensuing kickoff 22 yards to the Oakland 37-yard line, where the Raiders responded with a 10-play, 43-yard drive to score on a 38-yard field goal from Sebastian Janikowski. Then after Walter's 33-yard punt gave the Raiders a first down on their own 49, a 22-yard reception by receiver Jerry Rice set up Janikowski's second field goal, giving the Raiders a 13–3 lead with two minutes left in the third quarter.

In the fourth quarter, Brady led the Patriots on a 10-play, 67-yard drive, completing nine consecutive passes for 61 yards and finishing it with a 6-yard touchdown run that made the score 13–10. Later in the quarter, Patriots receiver Troy Brown returned Shane Lechler's 37-yard punt 27 yards to the Patriots 46-yard line. Brown fumbled the ball at the end of the return, but Pats linebacker Larry Izzo recovered it with 2:06 left on the clock. A few plays later, the "tuck" incident occurred. As Brady dropped back to pass, he lost the ball while being tackled by former college teammate Charles Woodson, and Oakland linebacker Greg Biekert recovered it with 1:47 left. However, an official instant replay review caused referee Walt Coleman to overturn the fumble, ruling Brady's arm had been moving forward while being tackled and making the play an incomplete pass. Taking advantage of his second chance, Brady completed a 13-yard pass to Patten and rushed for a 1-yard gain that moved the team to the Raiders 28-yard line, where Vinatieri made a 45-yard field goal with 27 seconds left, a dramatic kick through heavy snowfall that barely cleared the crossbar, sending the game into overtime.

New England won the coin toss and drove 63 yards in 14 plays for the winning field goal, with Brady completing eight consecutive passes for 45 yards, including a 20-yard completion to J. R. Redmond and a 6-yard pass to Patten at the Raiders' 22-yard line on fourth down and 4 to keep the drive alive. While Vinatieri's game-tying kick had the wind at his back, this drive was into the wind and the Patriots wanted to move closer. Following five runs from Antowain Smith for 15 yards and one from Brady for 2, and after a drive of more than eight minutes, Vinatieri and Walter cleared snow away from where the ball would be spotted. Vinatieri then gave New England its first lead of the game, making a 23-yard field goal to win.

Patten was the sole offensive star of the day, catching eight passes for 107 yards.

This was the third postseason meeting between the Raiders and Patriots. Both teams previously split the prior two meetings.

Previous playoff games
Tied 1–1 in all-time playoff games

1976

New England Patriots 21 @ Oakland Raiders 24

1976 AFC Divisional playoffs

1985

New England Patriots 27 @ Los Angeles Raiders 20

1985 AFC Divisional playoffs

=== Sunday, January 20, 2002 ===
==== AFC: Pittsburgh Steelers 27, Baltimore Ravens 10 ====
Baltimore Ravens vs. Pittsburgh Steelers – Game summary

Quarter	1	2	3	4	Total
Ravens	0	3	7	0	10
Steelers	10	10	0	7	27

at Heinz Field, Pittsburgh, Pennsylvania

- Game time: 12:30 p.m. EST
- Game weather: 21 °F (−6 °C), mostly cloudy
- Game attendance: 63,976
- Referee: Tony Corrente
- TV announcers (CBS): Dick Enberg (play-by-play), Dan Dierdorf (color commentator), and Bonnie Bernstein (sideline reporter)

Game information

First quarter

- PIT – Kris Brown 21-yard field goal, 9:07. Steelers 3–0. Drive: 7 plays, 40 yards, 4:16.
- PIT – Amos Zereoué 1-yard run (Kris Brown kick), 3:49. Steelers 10–0. Drive: 7 plays, 51 yards, 3:13.

Second quarter

- PIT – Amos Zereoué 1-yard run (Kris Brown kick), 5:43. Steelers 17–0. Drive: 6 plays, 43 yards, 3:27.
- PIT – Kris Brown 46-yard field goal, 3:46. Steelers 20–0. Drive: 4 plays, 6 yards, 1:33.
- BAL – Matt Stover 26-yard field goal, 0:51. Steelers 20–3. Drive: 11 plays, 57 yards, 2:55.

Third quarter

- BAL – Jermaine Lewis 88-yard punt return (Matt Stover kick), 7:18. Steelers 20–10.

Fourth quarter

- PIT – Plaxico Burress 32-yard pass from Kordell Stewart (Kris Brown kick), 14:11. Steelers 27–10. Drive: 12 plays, 83 yards, 5:54.

Top passers

- BAL – Elvis Grbac – 18/37, 153 yards, 3 INT
- PIT – Kordell Stewart – 12/22, 154 yards, TD, INT

Top rushers

- BAL – Terry Allen – 4 rushes, 11 yards
- PIT – Amos Zereoué – 24 rushes, 63 yards, 2 TD

Top receivers

- BAL – Shannon Sharpe – 5 receptions, 56 yards
- PIT – Plaxico Burress – 5 receptions, 84 yards, TD

Steelers running back Jerome Bettis, sidelined for much of the regular season, was scheduled to make his return in the first playoff game at their new home, Heinz Field, but was sidelined at the last minute due to a painkiller mishap. It did not matter as the Pittsburgh offense rushed for 150 yards and held the ball for over 40 minutes. Their defense limited the defending champion Ravens to 150 yards and seven first downs, forced four turnovers, and recorded three sacks. Bettis' replacement, Amos Zereoué, rushed for two touchdowns. The first half was a disaster for Baltimore. Their first six drives resulted in two interceptions, three punts without gaining a first down, and a fumble. Steelers cornerback Chad Scott started out the dominance by intercepting Baltimore quarterback Elvis Grbac's first pass of the game and returning it 19 yards to the Ravens 43-yard line. Pittsburgh's offense subsequently gained 37 yards on their first three plays. Linebacker Jamie Sharper managed to halt the drive by tackling Chris Fuamatu-Maʻafala for a 1-yard loss on third down and goal, but Kris Brown kicked a field goal to give Pittsburgh a 3–0 lead. The next time Baltimore had the ball, they were forced to punt after linebacker Mike Jones sacked Grbac for a 10-yard loss on third down and 10. Pittsburgh's offense then drove 51 yards in seven plays, featuring two completions from Kordell Stewart to receivers Plaxico Burress and Hines Ward for gains of 17 and 20 yards. Zereoue finished the drive with a 2-yard touchdown run to make it 10–0.

In the second quarter, Baltimore cornerback Chris McAlister gave the offense a great chance to score when he intercepted a pass from Stewart and returned it 18 yards to the Steelers 7-yard line. But on the next play, safety Brent Alexander intercepted Grbac's pass in the end zone for a touchback. The Steelers took over and drove to the Ravens 9-yard line, but on third down, Stewart was sacked for an 8-yard loss by Larry Webster and Brown's ensuing field goal attempt was wide left. Following another three and out for Baltimore, receiver Troy Edwards returned their punt 27-yards to the Ravens 43-yard line, setting up Zereoue's second touchdown run. Then linebacker Jason Gildon recovered a fumble from Terry Allen on Baltimore's next drive and the Steelers capitalized with a 46-yard field goal from Brown, increasing their lead to 20–0 with 4:23 left in the half. After going all this time without a single first down, Baltimore finally managed to respond on their next drive. Tight end Shannon Sharpe caught four passes for 48 yards on an 11-play, 57-yard drive. Matt Stover capped it off with a 26-yard field goal, cutting their deficit to 20–3 at halftime.

Late in the third quarter, Baltimore receiver Jermaine Lewis returned a punt 88 yards for a touchdown. But the Steelers responded by driving 83 yards in 12 plays and scoring with Stewart's 32-yard touchdown pass to Burress.

This was the first postseason meeting between the Ravens and Steelers.

==== NFC: St. Louis Rams 45, Green Bay Packers 17 ====
Green Bay Packers vs. St. Louis Rams – Game summary

Quarter	1	2	3	4	Total
Packers	7	3	0	7	17
Rams	7	17	14	7	45

at The Dome at America's Center, St. Louis, Missouri

- Game time: 4:00 p.m. EST/3:00 p.m. CST
- Game weather: Played indoors, domed stadium
- Game attendance: 66,338
- Referee: Jeff Triplette
- TV announcers (Fox): Pat Summerall (play-by-play), John Madden (color commentator), and Ron Pitts (sideline reporter)

Game information

First quarter

- STL – Aeneas Williams 29-yard interception return (Jeff Wilkins kick), 9:11. Rams 7–0.
- GB – Antonio Freeman 22-yard pass from Brett Favre (Ryan Longwell kick), 2:35. Tied 7–7. Drive: 5 plays, 65 yards, 2:08.

Second quarter

- STL – Torry Holt 4-yard pass from Kurt Warner (Jeff Wilkins kick), 14:58. Rams 14–7. Drive: 6 plays, 66 yards, 2:37.
- STL – James Hodgins 4-yard pass from Kurt Warner (Jeff Wilkins kick), 12:36. Rams 21–7. Drive: 2 plays, 4 yards, 0:43.
- GB – Ryan Longwell 28-yard field goal, 4:18. Rams 21–10. Drive: 9 plays, 40 yards, 4:08.
- STL – Jeff Wilkins 27-yard field goal, 0:21. Rams 24–10. Drive: 8 plays, 61 yards, 3:57.

Third quarter

- STL – Marshall Faulk 7-yard run (Jeff Wilkins kick), 9:44. Rams 31–10. Drive: 4 plays, 69 yards, 1:43.
- STL – Tommy Polley 34-yard interception return (Jeff Wilkins kick), 8:12. Rams 38–10.

Fourth quarter

- STL – Aeneas Williams 32-yard interception return (Jeff Wilkins kick), 7:50. Rams 45–10.
- GB – Antonio Freeman 8-yard pass from Brett Favre (Ryan Longwell kick), 5:46. Rams 45–17. Drive: 5 plays, 55 yards, 2:04.

Top passers

- GB – Brett Favre – 26/44, 281 yards, 2 TD, 6 INT
- STL – Kurt Warner – 18/30, 216 yards, 2 TD, INT

Top rushers

- GB – Ahman Green – 16 rushes, 94 yards
- STL – Marshall Faulk – 16 rushes, 82 yards, TD

Top receivers

- GB – Corey Bradford – 5 receptions, 79 yards
- STL – Torry Holt – 5 receptions, 84 yards, TD

The matchup between two of the league's highly rated quarterbacks — the Packers' Brett Favre and Rams' Kurt Warner, who shared a combined total of five NFL MVP awards, became lopsided thanks to St. Louis' improved defense, which forced eight turnovers. Although Favre threw for 281 yards, he tied a playoff record by tossing six interceptions, three of which were returned for touchdowns. The Packers generated most of their offense early in the contest, but the turnovers gave the Rams a 24–10 halftime lead. The Rams then returned two interceptions in the second half to put the game away.

Rams cornerback Aeneas Williams opened up the scoring by returning an interception from Favre 29 yards for a touchdown. The next time Green Bay had the ball, they turned it over again when safety Kim Herring stripped the ball from Ahman Green and rookie Adam Archuleta recovered it. However, the Rams were unable to take advantage of this turnover. A few plays later, Warner's pass was intercepted by Darren Sharper on the Packers 35-yard line. Favre then completed a pair of passes to Corey Bradford and Donald Driver for gains of 27 and 16 yards, before tying the game with a 22-yard touchdown pass to Antonio Freeman. But the Rams stormed right back with a 15-yard completion to Az-Zahir Hakim and a 38-yard burst from running back Marshall Faulk advancing the ball to the Packers 11-yard line. Two plays later, Warner completed a 4-yard touchdown pass to Torry Holt to put the Rams back in the lead. Then on Green Bay's next drive, Herring intercepted a pass from Favre and returned it 45 yards to the Packers 4-yard line, setting up a 4-yard touchdown catch by fullback James Hodgins early in the second quarter. Allen Rossum returned the ensuing kickoff 95 yards for a touchdown, but a holding penalty on Torrance Marshall eliminated the score. Green Bay still managed to score with a Ryan Longwell field goal, but Rams kicker Jeff Wilkins responded with a field goal of his own to give the Rams a 24–10 halftime lead.

In the second half, the Rams scored two touchdowns in a span of 92 seconds. On Green Bay's opening drive, Green's 49-yard run moved the ball into Rams territory. But three plays later, Williams stripped the ball from Freeman, dove on it, then got up and returned it for a touchdown. A replay challenge overruled the score, showing Williams was down by contact when he recovered the fumble, but three plays later, Holt's 50-yard reception set up a 7-yard touchdown run by Faulk. Then on Green Bay's next possession, Rams defensive end Grant Wistrom deflected a pass from Favre into the arms of linebacker Tommy Polley, who returned the interception 34 yards for a touchdown.

In fourth quarter, the Rams defense scored again with another interception return from Williams, making him the first player ever to return two interceptions for touchdowns in a playoff game. Meanwhile, they managed to pin down the Packers, only allowing a meaningless score on an 8-yard touchdown pass from Favre to Freeman with 5:46 left in the game.

This was the second postseason meeting between the Packers and Rams, with Green Bay having won the only prior meeting when the Rams were previously in Los Angeles.

Previous playoff games
Green Bay leads 1–0 in all-time playoff games

1967

Los Angeles Rams 7 @ Green Bay Packers 28

1967 NFL Western Conf. playoff

== Conference championships ==
=== Sunday, January 27, 2002 ===
==== AFC: New England Patriots 24, Pittsburgh Steelers 17 ====
New England Patriots vs. Pittsburgh Steelers – Game summary

Quarter	1	2	3	4	Total
Patriots	7	7	7	3	24
Steelers	0	3	14	0	17

at Heinz Field, Pittsburgh, Pennsylvania

- Game time: 12:30 p.m. EST
- Game weather: 50 °F (10 °C), partly sunny
- Game attendance: 64,704
- Referee: Ed Hochuli
- TV announcers (CBS): Greg Gumbel (play-by-play), Phil Simms (color commentator), Armen Keteyian, and Bonnie Bernstein (sideline reporters)

Game information

First quarter

- NE – Troy Brown 55-yard punt return (Adam Vinatieri kick), 3:42. Patriots 7–0.

Second quarter

- PIT – Kris Brown 30-yard field goal, 13:33. Patriots 7–3. Drive: 10 plays, 65 yards, 5:09.
- NE – David Patten 11-yard pass from Drew Bledsoe (Adam Vinatieri kick), 0:58. Patriots 14–3. Drive: 7 plays, 70 yards, 1:44.

Third quarter

- NE – Antwan Harris 49-yard blocked field goal return (Adam Vinatieri kick), 8:51. Patriots 21–3.
- PIT – Jerome Bettis 1-yard run (Kris Brown kick), 5:11. Patriots 21–10. Drive: 8 plays, 79 yards, 3:40.
- PIT – Amos Zereoue 11-yard run (Kris Brown kick), 1:29. Patriots 21–17. Drive: 5 plays, 32 yards, 1:41.

Fourth quarter

- NE – Adam Vinatieri 44-yard field goal, 11:12. Patriots 24–17. Drive: 11 plays, 45 yards, 5:17.

Top passers

- NE – Tom Brady – 12/18, 115 yards
- PIT – Kordell Stewart – 24/42, 255 yards, 3 INT

Top rushers

- NE – Antowain Smith – 15 rushes, 47 yards
- PIT – Kordell Stewart – 8 rushes, 41 yards

Top receivers

- NE – Troy Brown – 8 receptions, 121 yards
- PIT – Plaxico Buress – 5 receptions, 67 yards

The Patriots' storybook season continued as Drew Bledsoe came into the game in the second quarter in place of an injured Tom Brady – who replaced Bledsoe himself early in the season when he suffered a sheared blood vessel.

Both defenses controlled the game early on, and with just over four minutes left in the first quarter, the Steelers had to punt the ball from their own 13-yard line. Josh Miller appeared to bail his team out with a 64-yard punt, but Steelers receiver Troy Edwards was penalized for going out of bounds before tackling Troy Brown on the return. This turned out to make a big difference, as the punt was redone and on the second attempt, Brown returned it 55 yards for a touchdown. Pittsburgh responded by driving 65 yards in 10 plays, one of them a 34-yard run by quarterback Kordell Stewart, and scoring with a 30-yard field goal from Kris Brown, cutting the score to 7–3.

Later on, with under two minutes left in the half, Brady completed a 28-yard pass to Brown at the Steelers 40-yard line, but was knocked out of the game by a hit from safety Lethon Flowers. Bledsoe took over without missing a beat, rushing for four yards and completing three passes to David Patten for 36 yards, the last one an 11-yard touchdown to give the Patriots a 14–3 lead.

On the first drive of the second half, New England linebacker Tedy Bruschi recovered a fumbled snap on the Steelers 35-yard line. But the Patriots gained only two yards on their next four plays and ended up turning the ball over on downs. Pittsburgh subsequently drove 52 yards to the 16-yard line to set up Brown's second field goal attempt, but this time his kick was blocked by defensive tackle Brandon Mitchell and Troy Brown recovered the ball. After returning it 11 yards, Brown threw a lateral pass to Antwan Harris, who took the ball the remaining 45 yards for a touchdown to increase New England's lead to 21–3.

The Steelers struck back with Stewart completing a 24-yard pass to Hines Ward and a 19-yard screen pass to Amos Zereoué on an 8-play, 79-yard drive. Jerome Bettis finished it off with a 1-yard touchdown run, cutting the score to 21–10 with 5:11 left in the third quarter. New England was forced to punt after linebacker Jason Gildon sacked Bledsoe on third down, and Edwards returned the punt 28 yards to the Patriots 32-yard line. Five plays later, Zereoue scored with an 11-yard touchdown run, making the score 21–17.

Early in the fourth quarter, Adam Vinatieri's 44-yard field goal at the end of a 45-yard drive increased New England's lead to 24–17. Later in the quarter, the Patriots made two key stops to clinch the victory. First, safety Tebucky Jones intercepted a pass from Stewart and returned it 19 yards to the Steelers 34-yard line. Pittsburgh's defense managed to prevent a first down and Vinatieri missed a 50-yard field goal attempt that would have sealed the game, giving the Steelers the ball back on their own 40-yard line, but a few plays later, Lawyer Milloy intercepted a pass from Stewart with 2:02 left to seal the game, and the Patriots were able to run out the clock.

Brown was the top offensive performer of the day with eight receptions for 121 yards, along with three punt returns for 80 yards. Brady completed 12 of 18 passes for 115 yards, while Bledsoe completed 10 of 21 passes for 102 yards and a touchdown.

This was the third postseason meeting between the Patriots and Steelers. Both teams split their two prior meetings.

Previous playoff games
Tied 1–1 in all-time playoff games

1996

Pittsburgh Steelers 3 @ New England Patriots 28

1996 AFC Divisional playoffs

1997

New England Patriots 6 @ Pittsburgh Steelers 7

1997 AFC Divisional playoffs

==== NFC: St. Louis Rams 29, Philadelphia Eagles 24 ====
Philadelphia Eagles vs. St. Louis Rams – Game summary

Quarter	1	2	3	4	Total
Eagles	3	14	0	7	24
Rams	10	3	9	7	29

at Edward Jones Dome, St. Louis, Missouri

- Game time: 4:00 p.m. EST/3:00 p.m. CST
- Game weather: Played indoors, domed stadium
- Game attendance: 66,502
- Referee: Gerald Austin
- TV announcers (Fox): Pat Summerall (play-by-play), John Madden (color commentator), Ron Pitts, and Pam Oliver (sideline reporters)

Game information

First quarter

- STL – Isaac Bruce 5-yard pass from Kurt Warner (Jeff Wilkins kick), 12:00. Rams 7–0. Drive: 5 plays, 21 yards, 2:43.
- PHI – David Akers 46-yard field goal, 5:44. Rams 7–3. Drive: 11 plays, 45 yards, 6:16.
- STL – Jeff Wilkins 27-yard field goal, 1:06. Rams 10–3. Drive: 9 plays, 54 yards, 4:38.

Second quarter

- PHI – Duce Staley 1-yard run (David Akers kick), 6:56. Tied 10–10. Drive: 5 plays, 57 yards, 2:48.
- STL – Jeff Wilkins 39-yard field goal, 3:52. Rams 13–10. Drive: 7 plays, 45 yards, 3:04.
- PHI – Todd Pinkston 12-yard pass from Donovan McNabb (David Akers kick), 0:46. Eagles 17–13. Drive: 9 plays, 64 yards, 3:06.

Third quarter

- STL – Jeff Wilkins 41-yard field goal, 8:01. Eagles 17–16. Drive: 12 plays, 44 yards, 6:59.
- STL – Marshall Faulk 1-yard run (pass failed), 1:18. Rams 22–17. Drive: 10 plays, 71 yards, 5:38.

Fourth quarter

- STL – Marshall Faulk 1-yard run (Jeff Wilkins kick), 6:55. Rams 29–17. Drive: 7 plays, 56 yards, 4:27.
- PHI – Donovan McNabb 3-yard run (David Akers kick), 2:56. Rams 29–24. Drive: 9 plays, 52 yards, 3:59.

Top passers

- PHI – Donovan McNabb – 18/30, 171 yards, TD, INT
- STL – Kurt Warner – 22/33, 212 yards, TD

Top rushers

- PHI – Correll Buckhalter – 6 rushes, 50 yards
- STL – Marshall Faulk – 31 rushes, 159 yards, 2 TD

Top receivers

- PHI – Duce Staley – 8 receptions, 58 yards
- STL – Isaac Bruce – 8 receptions, 84 yards, TD

The Eagles, a 12-point underdog, had a surprising 17–13 lead at halftime, and had not allowed more than 21 points per game during the season and playoffs. But the Rams roared back thanks to Kurt Warner completing two-thirds of his passes for 212 yards and Marshall Faulk's 159 yards rushing and two touchdowns to earn their second trip to the Super Bowl in three years.

Early in the first quarter, Donovan McNabb fumbled while being sacked by defensive end Leonard Little, and Brian Young recovered for the Rams at the Philadelphia 20-yard line. Five plays later, Warner threw a 5-yard touchdown pass to Isaac Bruce. Philadelphia responded with an 11-play, 50-yard drive, featuring a 20-yard run by Duce Staley, that ended with a 46-yard field goal by David Akers. Rams receiver Yo Murphy returned the ensuing kickoff 43 yards to his team's own 42-yard line before Warner completed a 20-yard pass to Az-Zahir Hakim and Faulk rushed for 15 yards to set up a 27-yard field goal from Jeff Wilkins, giving the Rams a 10–3 lead.

Early in the second quarter, Wilkins hit the crossbar on a 53-yard field goal attempt, and the Eagles took over on their 43-yard line. On the next play, rookie running back Correll Buckhalter broke off a 31-yard run to the St. Louis 26. A few plays later, Staley finished the drive with a 1-yard touchdown run to tie the game. But on the Rams next drive, a 31-yard run by Faulk set up 39-yard field goal by Wilkins, and the Rams retook the lead. But McNabb responded with two completions to James Thrash for 27 yards and a 12-yard throw to Chad Lewis before throwing a 12-yard touchdown pass to Todd Pinkston with 46 seconds left in the half.

St. Louis dominated the Eagles in the third quarter, holding the ball for 12:30 and limiting Philadelphia to just five offensive plays. Murphy fumbled the opening kickoff, but Rams rookie Nick Sorensen recovered it. Following seven runs by Faulk for 27 yards, Warner completed a 21-yard pass to Torry Holt at the Eagles 19-yard line, setting up Wilkins' third field goal to cut it to 17–16. Then after forcing a three-and-out, the Rams drove 71 yards in 10 plays, with Warner completing three passes to Bruce for 44 yards and a 16-yard pass to Holt at the Eagles 9-yard line. Faulk subsequently took the ball into the end zone with three consecutive running plays, giving the Rams a 22–17 lead after tight end Ernie Conwell dropped Warner's pass on a two-point conversion attempt.

Philadelphia went three-and-out again on its next two possessions, and Faulk took advantage of an Eagles' defense that was on the field for most of the second half. On the Rams drive after the second punt, he broke a 25-yard run on third down and 1, caught a 10-yard pass, and then ran for eight yards before finally scoring a 1-yard touchdown run to increase the Rams lead to 29–17 with 6:55 left in the game. A 41-yard kickoff return to the Rams 48-yard line from Brian Mitchell sparked an Eagles rally. McNabb led the Eagles 52 yards, completing an 11-yard pass to Lewis on fourth down and 8 and a 17-yard pass to Thrash before taking the ball across the goal line himself on a 3-yard run. After forcing a punt, the Eagles got the ball back on their own 45-yard line with 2:20 left. But on a fourth down and 7 conversion attempt, St. Louis cornerback Aeneas Williams intercepted a pass intended for Freddie Mitchell and the Rams held the ball for the rest of the game.

This was the third postseason meeting between the Eagles and Rams. Both teams split the two prior meetings when the Rams were previously in Los Angeles.

Previous playoff games
Tied 1–1 in all-time playoff games

1949

Philadelphia Eagles 14 @ Los Angeles Rams 0

1949 NFL Championship Game

1989

Los Angeles Rams 21 @ Philadelphia Eagles 7

1989 NFC Wild Card playoffs

== Super Bowl XXXVI: New England Patriots 20, St. Louis Rams 17 ==
Super Bowl XXXVI – St. Louis Rams vs. New England Patriots – Game summary

Quarter	1	2	3	4	Total
Rams (NFC)	3	0	0	14	17
Patriots (AFC)	0	14	3	3	20

at Louisiana Superdome, New Orleans, Louisiana

- Date: February 3, 2002
- Game attendance: 72,922
- Referee: Bernie Kukar
- TV announcers (Fox): Pat Summerall (play-by-play) and John Madden (color commentator)

This was the first postseason meeting between the Rams and Patriots.
