= 2001 Green Bay Packers season =

American football season

- General manager: Mike Sherman
- President: Bob Harlan
- Head coach: Mike Sherman
- Offensive coordinator: Tom Rossley
- Defensive coordinator: Ed Donatell
- Home stadium: Lambeau Field

Results
- Record: 12–4
- Division place: 2nd NFC Central
- Playoffs: Won Wild Card Playoffs (vs. 49ers) 25–15; Lost Divisional Playoffs (at Rams) 17–45
- All-Pros: 2: QB Brett Favre (2nd team); RB Ahman Green (2nd team)
- Pro Bowlers: 3: QB Brett Favre; RB Ahman Green; TE Bubba Franks

The 2001 Green Bay Packers season was their 83rd season overall and their 81st season in the National Football League.

The Packers returned to the postseason for the first time since 1998 after two years of missing the playoffs in the 1999 and 2000 seasons. They finished with a 12–4 record. In the Wild Card Round, the Packers easily beat the San Francisco 49ers 25–15. However, Green Bay's season ended with a 45–17 loss to the St. Louis Rams in the NFC divisional playoff game. That game saw quarterback Brett Favre throw a career high six interceptions.

This remains the last season in which the Packers defeated the 49ers in the playoffs as the Packers went on to lose 5 straight playoff games to them.

== Offseason ==
=== Notable transactions ===
- March 31, 2001 – The Green Bay Packers traded Matt Hasselbeck and their 1st-round pick to the Seattle Seahawks in exchange for the Seahawks 1st and 3rd-round picks.

==== Free agents ====
Additions	Subtractions
DT Jim Flanigan (Bears)	T/G Ross Verba (Browns)
QB Doug Pederson (Browns)	QB Danny Wuerffel (Bears)
	LB Brian Williams (Saints)
	LB Mike Morton (Colts)

=== 2001 NFL draft ===
With their first-round pick (10th overall) in the 2001 NFL draft, the Green Bay Packers selected defensive end Jamal Reynolds.

2001 Green Bay Packers draft
Round	Pick	Player	Position	College	Notes
1	10	Jamal Reynolds	Defensive end	Florida State	
2	41	Robert Ferguson	Wide receiver	Texas A&M	
3	71	Bhawoh Jue	Safety	Penn State	
3	72	Torrance Marshall	Linebacker	Oklahoma	
4	105	Bill Ferrario	Guard	Wisconsin	
6	198	David Martin	Tight end	Tennessee	
Made roster

==== Undrafted free agents ====
2001 undrafted free agents of note
Player	Position	College
DeVone Claybrooks	Defensive tackle	East Carolina
Donté Curry	Linebacker	Morris Brown
Damian Demps	Safety	Central Florida
Jason Franklin	Wide receiver	Delta State
Kevin Jordan	Offensive Tackle	Fresno State
DeAngelo Lloyd	Defensive end	Tennessee
Marques McFadden	Guard	Arizona
Kevin Stemke	Punter	Wisconsin
Brett Sterba	Kicker	William & Mary
Jacob Waasdorp	Defensive tackle	California

== Personnel ==
=== Staff ===
2001 Green Bay Packers staff
Front office: President and chief executive officer – Bob Harlan; Executive vice president and general manager – Mike Sherman; Senior vice president of administration – John Jones; Vice president of football operations – Mark Hatley; Director of Player Finance – Andrew Brandt; Director of college scouting – John Dorsey; Director of pro personnel – Reggie McKenzie; Assistant Director of College Scouting – Shaun Herock; Assistant Director of pro personnel – Sean Howard; Head coaches: Head coach – Mike Sherman; Offensive coaches: Offensive coordinator – Tom Rossley; Running backs – Sylvester Croom; Wide receivers – Ray Sherman; Tight ends – Jeff Jagodzinski; Offensive line – Larry Beightol; Assistant offensive line – Pat Ruel; Offensive assistant/quality control – Darrell Bevell	Defensive coaches: Defensive coordinator – Ed Donatell; Defensive line – Jethro Franklin; Linebackers – Bo Pelini; Defensive backs – Bob Slowik; Assistant Defensive Backs – Lionel Washington; Defensive assistant/quality control – Brad Miller; Special teams coaches: Special teams – Frank Novak; Quality Control Assistant/special teams-Offense – Stan Drayton; Strength and conditioning: Strength and conditioning – Barry Rubin; Strength and Conditioning Assistant – Mark Lovat; Weight Room Assistant – Vince Workman

=== Roster ===
2001 Green Bay Packers roster
Quarterbacks: 4 Brett Favre; 18 Doug Pederson; Running backs: 29 Herbert Goodman; 30 Ahman Green; 33 William Henderson FB; 25 Dorsey Levens; Wide receivers: 85 Corey Bradford; 80 Donald Driver; 89 Robert Ferguson; 86 Antonio Freeman; 82 Charles Lee; 84 Bill Schroeder; Tight ends: 81 Tyrone Davis; 88 Bubba Franks; 83 David Martin	Offensive linemen: 76 Chad Clifton OT; 72 Earl Dotson OT; 63 Bill Ferrario G; 58 Mike Flanagan C; 62 Marco Rivera G; 79 Barry Stokes OT; 65 Mark Tauscher G; 68 Mike Wahle G; 52 Frank Winters C; Defensive linemen: 93 Gilbert Brown DT; 71 Santana Dotson DT; 75 Jim Flanigan DT; 94 Kabeer Gbaja-Biamila DE; 90 Vonnie Holliday DE; 97 Cletidus Hunt DT; 98 Billy Lyon DE; 99 Jamal Reynolds DE; 95 Rod Walker DT	Linebackers: 59 Na'il Diggs OLB; 55 Bernardo Harris MLB; 56 Rob Holmberg OLB; 51 Torrance Marshall MLB; 54 Nate Wayne OLB; 50 K. D. Williams OLB; Defensive backs: 28 Matt Bowen FS; 47 Scott Frost FS; 23 Billy Jenkins SS; 21 Bhawoh Jue SS; 27 Tod McBride CB; 34 Mike McKenzie CB; 20 Allen Rossum CB; 42 Darren Sharper FS; 22 Keith Thibodeaux CB; 37 Tyrone Williams CB; Special teams: 9 Josh Bidwell P; 60 Rob Davis LS; 8 Ryan Longwell K	Injured Reserve: 36 LeRoy Butler S (IR); 24 Antuan Edwards S (IR); 57 Chris Gizzi MLB (IR); 78 Kevin Jordan OT (IR); 32 Rondell Mealey RB (IR); 91 John Thierry DE (IR); 96 Steve Warren DT (PUP); 16 Travis Williams WR (Military); Practice Squad: 10 Henry Burris QB; 35 Chris Gall FB; 17 Mike Horacek WR; 70 Ed Kehl DE; 46 Paris Lenon OLB; Rookies in italics 53 active, 8 inactive, 5 practice squad

== Preseason ==
Date	Opponent	Result	Game site	Record	Attendance
August 11	at Cleveland Browns	L 3–10	Cleveland Browns Stadium	0–1	71,218
August 20	Denver Broncos	W 22–7	Lambeau Field	1–1	59,177
August 25	Miami Dolphins	W 17–12	Lambeau Field	2–1	59,547
August 31	at Oakland Raiders	L 13–24	Network Associates Coliseum	2–2	38,783

== Regular season ==
=== Schedule ===
The second game in 2001 was the first time since 1988 that the Packers played the Washington Redskins. because before the admission of the Texans in 2002, NFL scheduling formulas for games outside a team's division were influenced much more by table position during the previous season, and there was no rotation of opponents in other divisions of a team's own conference. The Packers finished 12–4 overall, placing 2nd in the NFC Central Division (behind the Chicago Bears), and qualifying for a wild card playoff spot.

Week	Date	Opponent	Result	Record	Venue	Attendance
1	September 9	Detroit Lions	W 28–6	1–0	Lambeau Field	59,523
2 (Note: The Packers were originally scheduled to play the New York Giants during Week 2 of the original NFL schedule (September 16) at Giants Stadium in East Rutherford. However, due to the September 11 attacks, the game was rescheduled to Week 17.)	September 24	Washington Redskins	W 37–0	2–0	Lambeau Field	59,771
3	September 30	at Carolina Panthers	W 28–7	3–0	Ericsson Stadium	73,120
4	October 7	at Tampa Bay Buccaneers	L 10–14	3–1	Raymond James Stadium	65,510
5	October 14	Baltimore Ravens	W 31–23	4–1	Lambeau Field	59,866
6	October 21	at Minnesota Vikings	L 13–35	4–2	Hubert H. Humphrey Metrodome	64,165
7	Bye					
8	November 4	Tampa Bay Buccaneers	W 21–20	5–2	Lambeau Field	59,861
9	November 11	at Chicago Bears	W 20–12	6–2	Soldier Field	66,944
10	November 18	Atlanta Falcons	L 20–23	6–3	Lambeau Field	59,849
11	November 22	at Detroit Lions	W 29–27	7–3	Pontiac Silverdome	77,730
12	December 3	at Jacksonville Jaguars	W 28–21	8–3	Alltel Stadium	66,908
13	December 9	Chicago Bears	W 17–7	9–3	Lambeau Field	59,869
14	December 16	at Tennessee Titans	L 20–26	9–4	Adelphia Coliseum	68,804
15	December 23	Cleveland Browns	W 30–7	10–4	Lambeau Field	59,824
16	December 30	Minnesota Vikings	W 24–13	11–4	Lambeau Field	59,870
17	January 6	at New York Giants	W 34–25	12–4	Giants Stadium	78,601

=== Game summaries ===
==== Week 1: vs Detroit Lions ====
Week 1: Detroit Lions at Green Bay Packers – Game summary

Quarter	1	2	3	4	Total
Lions	3	3	0	0	6
Packers	21	0	7	0	28

at Lambeau Field, Green Bay, Wisconsin

- Date: September 9
- Game time: 11:00 a.m. CDT
- Game weather: 60 °F (16 °C)
- Game attendance: 59,523
- Referee: Aster Sizemore
- TV announcers (FOX): Curt Menefee, Brian Baldinger, Drew Smith
- Box score

Game information

First quarter

- GB – Ahman Green 31-yard run (Ryan Longwell kick), 12:27. Packers 7–0. Drive: 4 plays, 73 yards, 1:36.
- GB – Bill Schroeder 23-yard pass from Brett Favre (Ryan Longwell kick), 6:08. Packers 14–0. Drive: 5 plays, 65 yards, 2:46.
- GB – Ahman Green 83-yard run (Ryan Longwell kick), 4:29. Packers 21–0. Drive: 1 play, 83 yards, 0:14.
- DET – Jason Hanson 49-yard field goal, 2:12. Packers 21–3. Drive: 6 plays, 42 yards, 2:17.

Second quarter

- DET – Jason Hanson 39-yard field goal, 4:06. Packers 21–6. Drive: 10 plays, 31 yards, 4:49.

Third quarter

- GB – Bubba Franks 1-yard pass from Brett Favre (Ryan Longwell kick), 3:54. Packers 28–6. Drive: 12 plays, 75 yards, 6:47.

Fourth quarter

- No scoring plays

Top passers

- DET – Charlie Batch – 20/39, 276 yards, 2 INT
- GB – Brett Favre – 22/28, 260 yards, 2 TD

Top rushers

- DET – James Stewart – 13 rushes, 39 yards
- GB – Ahman Green – 17 rushes, 157 yards, 2 TD

Top receivers

- DET – Johnnie Morton – 5 receptions, 111 yards
- GB – Bill Schroeder – 4 receptions, 104 yards, TD

==== Week 3: at Carolina Panthers ====
Week 3: Green Bay Packers at Carolina Panthers – Game summary

Quarter	1	2	3	4	Total
Packers	0	6	15	7	28
Panthers	0	7	0	0	7

at Ericsson Stadium, Charlotte, North Carolina

- Date: September 30
- Game time: 12:00 p.m. CDT
- Game weather: 64 °F (18 °C)
- Game attendance: 73,120
- Referee: Tony Corrente
- TV announcers (Fox): Sam Rosen, Bill Maas, Paul Butler
- Recap

Game information

First quarter

- No scoring plays

Second quarter

- CAR – Wesley Walls 3-yard pass from Chris Weinke (John Kasay kick), 13:44. Panthers 7–0. Drive: 11 plays, 58 yards, 3:51.
- GB – Ryan Longwell 42-yard field goal, 8:26. Panthers 7–3. Drive: 9 plays, 69 yards, 3:50.
- GB – Ryan Longwell 46-yard field goal, 0:58. Panthers 7–6. Drive: 11 plays, 58 yards, 5:11.

Third quarter

- GB – Bill Schroeder 12-yard pass from Brett Favre (Antonio Freeman pass from Brett Favre), 12:20. Packers 14–7. Drive: 5 plays, 80 yards, 2:18.
- GB – Bubba Franks 6-yard pass from Brett Favre (Ryan Longwell kick), 8:30. Packers 21–7. Drive: 8 plays, 38 yards, 2:36.

Fourth quarter

- GB – Corey Bradford 5-yard pass from Brett Favre (Ryan Longwell kick), 12:23. Packers 28–7. Drive: 8 plays, 48 yards, 3:46.

Top passers

- GB – Brett Favre – 25/39, 308 yards, 3 TD, 2 INT
- CAR – Chris Weinke – 18/30, 160 yards, TD, INT

Top rushers

- GB – Ahman Green – 19 rushes, 53 yards
- CAR – Richard Huntley – 5 rushes, 19 yards

Top receivers

- GB – Ahman Green – 6 receptions, 75 yards
- CAR – Donald Hayes – 4 receptions, 52 yards

==== Week 6: at Minnesota Vikings ====
Week 6: Green Bay Packers at Minnesota Vikings – Game summary

Quarter	1	2	3	4	Total
Packers	0	0	7	6	13
Vikings	0	20	0	15	35

at Hubert H. Humphrey Metrodome, Minneapolis, Minnesota

- Date: October 21
- Game time: 3:15 p.m. CDT
- Game weather: None (indoor stadium)
- Game attendance: 64,165
- Referee: Ron Winter (14)
- TV announcers (FOX): Pat Summerall, John Madden, Ron Pitts
- Recap, Game Book

Game information

First quarter

- No scoring plays.

Second quarter

- MIN – Cris Carter 43-yard pass from Daunte Culpepper (Gary Anderson kick), 8:18. Vikings 7–0. Drive: 6 plays, 68 yards, 3:47.
- MIN – Kailee Wong 27-yard interception return (Gary Anderson kick), 7:56. Vikings 14–0.
- MIN – Gary Anderson 42-yard field goal, 3:29. Vikings 17–0. Drive: 7 plays, 22 yards, 3:31.
- MIN – Gary Anderson 36-yard field goal, 0:04. Vikings 20–0. Drive: 7 plays, 62 yards, 1:30.

Third quarter

- GB – Bubba Franks 2-yard pass from Brett Favre (Ryan Longwell kick), 10:20. Vikings 20–7. Drive: 8 plays, 73 yards, 4:40.

Fourth quarter

- MIN – Daunte Culpepper 14-yard run (Daunte Culpepper–Jake Reed pass), 14:07. Vikings 28–7. Drive: 11 plays, 63 yards, 6:33.
- MIN – Jim Kleinsasser 2-yard run (Gary Anderson kick), 2:47. Vikings 35–7. Drive: 14 plays, 73 yards, 9:34.
- GB – Charles Lee 3-yard pass from Brett Favre (pass failed), 0:45. Vikings 35–13. Drive: 8 plays, 69 yards, 2:02.

Top passers

- GB – Brett Favre – 21/35, 169 yards, 2 TD, INT
- MIN – Daunte Culpepper – 18/27, 184 yards, TD

Top rushers

- GB – Ahman Green – 11 rushes, 73 yards
- MIN – Doug Chapman – 22 rushes, 90 yards

Top receivers

- GB – Antonio Freeman – 5 receptions, 57 yards
- MIN – Randy Moss – 8 receptions, 73 yards

==== Week 9: at Chicago Bears ====
Week 9: Green Bay Packers at Chicago Bears

Quarter	1	2	3	4	Total
Packers	0	10	7	3	20
Bears	6	3	3	0	12

at Soldier Field, Chicago, Illinois

- Date: November 11, 2001
- Game time: 12:00 p.m. CST
- Game weather: Overcast, 48 °F (9 °C)
- Game attendance: 66,944
- TV announcers (Fox): Dick Stockton, Troy Aikman, Daryl Johnston, and Pam Oliver

Game information

First quarter

Second quarter

Third quarter

Fourth quarter

Top passers

- GB – Brett Favre – 19/32, 268 yards, 2 TD, INT
- CHI – Jim Miller – 28/47, 201 yards

Top rushers

- GB – Ahman Green – 18 rushes, 93 yards
- CHI – Anthony Thomas – 22 rushes, 45 yards

Top receivers

- GB – Bill Schroeder – 4 receptions, 100 yards, TD
- CHI – Marty Booker – 8 receptions, 81 yards

==== Week 11: at Detroit Lions ====
Week 11: Green Bay Packers at Detroit Lions

Quarter	1	2	3	4	Total
Packers	7	10	7	5	29
Lions	3	10	0	14	27

at Pontiac Silverdome, Pontiac, Michigan

- Date: November 22, 2001
- Game time: 11:36 p.m. CST/12:36 p.m. EST
- Game weather: None (indoor stadium)
- Game attendance: 77,730
- TV announcers (Fox): Pat Summerall and John Madden

Game information

First quarter

Second quarter

Third quarter

Fourth quarter

Top passers

- GB – Brett Favre – 18/26, 252 yards, 2 TD
- DET – Charlie Batch – 8/19, 118 yards, INT

Top rushers

- GB – Ahman Green – 22 rushes, 102 yards, TD
- DET – James Stewart – 14 rushes, 102 yards

Top receivers

- GB – Antonio Freeman – 6 receptions, 89 yards, TD
- DET – Johnnie Morton – 4 receptions, 67 yards

==== Week 12: at Jacksonville Jaguars ====
Week Twelve: Green Bay Packers at Jacksonville Jaguars – Game summary

Quarter	1	2	3	4	Total
Packers	0	7	14	7	28
Jaguars	3	10	8	0	21

at Alltel Stadium, Jacksonville, Florida

- Date: December 3, 2001
- Game time: 9:00 p.m. EST
- Game weather: 56 °F (13 °C)
- Game attendance: 66,908
- Referee: Mike Carey
- TV announcers (ABC): Al Michaels, Dan Fouts, Dennis Miller, Melissa Stark, and Eric Dickerson
- Recap, Game Book

Game information

First quarter

- JAX – Mike Hollis 34-yard field goal, 11:21. Jaguars 3–0. Drive: 8 plays, 48 yards, 3:39.

Second quarter

- JAX – Elvis Joseph 29-yard pass from Mark Brunell (Mike Hollis kick), 7:11. Jaguars 10–0. Drive: 7 plays, 58 yards, 2:49.
- JAX – Mike Hollis 30-yard field goal, 1:55. Jaguars 13–0. Drive: 8 plays, 42 yards, 4:22.
- GB – Ahman Green 13-yard pass from Brett Favre (Ryan Longwell kick), 0:25. Jaguars 13–7. Drive: 6 plays, 68 yards, 1:30.

Third quarter

- JAX – Ainsley Battles 60-yard fumble return (pass succeeded), 3:45. Jaguars 21–7.
- GB – Bill Schroeder 43-yard pass from Brett Favre (Ryan Longwell kick), 2:38. Jaguars 21–14. Drive: 3 plays, 55 yards, 1:07.
- GB – Bubba Franks 1-yard pass from Brett Favre (Ryan Longwell kick), 0:58. Tied 21–21. Drive: 3 plays, 32 yards, 1:29.

Fourth quarter

- GB – Brett Favre 6-yard run (Ryan Longwell kick), 1:30. Packer 28–21. Drive: 4 plays, 56 yards, 0:33.

Top passers

- GB – Brett Favre – 24/42, 362 yards, 3 TD
- JAX – Mark Brunell – 26/45, 311 yards, TD, 2 INT

Top rushers

- GB – Ahman Green – 17 rushes, 31 yards
- JAX – Stacey Mack – 16 rushes, 27 yards

Top receivers

- GB – Bill Schroeder – 6 receptions, 106 yards, TD
- JAX – Jimmy Smith – 8 receptions, 116 yards

==== Week 13: vs Chicago Bears ====
Week 13: Chicago Bears at Green Bay Packers

Quarter	1	2	3	4	Total
Bears	0	0	7	0	7
Packers	7	0	7	3	17

at Lambeau Field, Green Bay, Wisconsin

- Date: December 9, 2001
- Game time: 12:00 p.m. CST
- Game weather: Overcast, 33 °F (1 °C)
- Game attendance: 59,869
- TV announcers (Fox): Dick Stockton, Troy Aikman, Daryl Johnston, and Pam Oliver

Game information

First quarter

Second quarter

Third quarter

Fourth quarter

Top passers

- CHI – Jim Miller – 18/33, 139 yards, INT
- GB – Brett Favre – 10/25, 96 yards, TD, INT

Top rushers

- CHI – Anthony Thomas – 15 rushes, 54 yards, TD
- GB – Ahman Green – 29 rushes, 125 yards, TD

Top receivers

- CHI – Dez White – 5 receptions, 36 yards
- GB – Antonio Freeman – 2 receptions, 36 yards, TD

==== Week 15: vs Cleveland Browns ====
Week 15: Cleveland Browns at Green Bay Packers

Quarter	1	2	3	4	Total
Browns	0	7	0	0	7
Packers	13	10	0	7	30

at Lambeau Field, Green Bay, Wisconsin

- Date: December 23, 2001
- Game time: 3:15 p.m. CST
- Game weather: Overcast, 24 °F (−4 °C)
- Game attendance: 59,824
- TV announcers (CBS): Dick Enberg, Dan Dierdorf, Bonnie Bernstein

Game information

First quarter

Second quarter

Third quarter

Fourth quarter

Top passers

- CLE – Tim Couch – 22/33, 203 yards, TD, 3 INT
- GB – Brett Favre – 18/28, 139 yards, 3 TD

Top rushers

- CLE – Jamel White – 21 rushes, 131 yards
- GB – Anthony Thomas – 31 rushes, 96 yards, TD

Top receivers

- CLE – Jamel White – 9 receptions, 85 yards, TD
- GB – Bubba Franks – 4 receptions, 29 yards, 2 TD

==== Week 16: vs Minnesota Vikings ====
Week 16: Minnesota Vikings at Green Bay Packers – Game summary

Quarter	1	2	3	4	Total
Vikings	0	3	3	7	13
Packers	0	7	0	17	24

at Lambeau Field, Green Bay, Wisconsin

- Date: December 30
- Game time: 12:00 p.m. CDT
- Game weather: Partly cloudy, 19 °F (−7 °C)
- Game attendance: 59,870
- Referee: Larry Nemmers (20)
- TV announcers (FOX): Pat Summerall and John Madden
- Recap, Game Book

Game information

First quarter

- No scoring plays.

Second quarter

- MIN – Gary Anderson 44-yard field goal, 8:16. Vikings 3–0. Drive: 5 plays, 43 yards, 1:47.
- GB – Donald Driver 31-yard run (Ryan Longwell kick), 3:18. Packers 7–3. Drive: 7 plays, 70 yards, 4:58.

Third quarter

- MIN – Gary Anderson 42-yard field goal, 5:07. Packers 7–6. Drive: 4 plays, 8 yards, 1:14.

Fourth quarter

- GB – Ryan Longwell 24-yard field goal, 11:57. Packers 10–6. Drive: 6 plays, 19 yards, 2:55.
- MIN – Byron Chamberlain 47-yard pass from Spergon Wynn (Gary Anderson kick), 10:03. Vikings 13–10. Drive: 5 plays, 59 yards, 1:54.
- GB – Ahman Green 4-yard run (Ryan Longwell kick), 6:28. Packers 17–13. Drive: 7 plays, 79 yards, 3:35.
- GB – Mike McKenzie 38-yard interception return (Ryan Longwell kick), 5:25. Packers 24–13.

Top passers

- MIN – Spergon Wynn – 11/30, 114 yards, TD, 3 INT
- GB – Brett Favre – 18/29, 169 yards

Top rushers

- MIN – Michael Bennett – 25 rushes, 104 yards
- GB – Ahman Green – 16 rushes, 31 yards, TD

Top receivers

- MIN – Byron Chamberlain – 3 receptions, 66 yards, TD
- GB – Antonio Freeman – 3 receptions, 43 yards

==== Week 17: at New York Giants ====
Week 17: Green Bay Packers at New York Giants – game summary

Quarter	1	2	3	4	Total
Packers	14	3	17	0	34
Giants	7	3	0	15	25

at Giants Stadium, East Rutherford, New Jersey

- Date: January 6
- Game time: 1:00 p.m. EST
- Game weather: Overcast, 39 °F (4 °C)
- Game attendance: 78,601
- Referee: Johnny Grier
- TV announcers (Fox): Dick Stockton, Troy Aikman, Daryl Johnston and Pam Oliver
  - Original announcers for September 16, 2001: Pat Summerall, John Madden and Ron Pitts

Game information

First quarter

- GB – Bill Schroeder 26-yard pass from Brett Favre (Ryan Longwell kick), 11:04. Packers 7–0. Drive: 4 plays, 62 yards, 2:13.
- GB – Ahman Green 25-yard run (Ryan Longwell kick), 8:33. Packers 14–0. Drive: 3 plays, 44 yards, 1:02.
- NYG – Ike Hilliard 8-yard pass from Kerry Collins (Morten Andersen kick), 3:43. Packers 14–7. Drive: 8 plays, 67 yards, 4:50.

Second quarter

- NYG – Morten Andersen 27-yard field goal, 11:54. Packers 14–10. Drive: 5 plays, 66 yards, 1:15.
- GB – Ryan Longwell 44-yard field goal, 0:00. Packers 17–10. Drive: 6 plays, 59 yards, 1:04.

Third quarter

- GB – Ahman Green 1-yard run (Ryan Longwell kick), 12:07. Packers 24–10. Drive: 5 plays, 31 yards, 2:53.
- GB – Ryan Longwell 43-yard field goal, 7:52. Packers 27–10. Drive: 7 plays, 57 yards, 2:44.
- GB – Corey Bradford 54-yard pass from Brett Favre (Ryan Longwell kick), 4:35. Packers 34–10. Drive: 3 plays, 53 yards, 0:55.

Fourth quarter

- NYG – Tiki Barber 10-yard run (Morten Andersen kick), 12:45. Packers 34–17. Drive: 6 plays, 57 yards, 1:58.
- NYG – Ron Dayne 1-yard run (Dayne run), 2:50. Packers 34–25. Drive: 19 plays, 99 yards, 5:18.

Top passers

- GB – Brett Favre – 15/30, 315 yards, 2 TD
- NYG – Kerry Collins – 36/59, 386 yards, TD, 2 INT

Top rushers

- GB – Ahman Green – 23 rushes, 101 yards, 2 TD
- NYG – Ron Dayne – 10 rushes, 81 yards, TD

Top receivers

- GB – Corey Bradford – 3 receptions, 111 yards, TD
- NYG – Joe Jurevicius – 8 receptions, 82 yards

== Standings ==
NFC Central
	W	L	T	PCT	PF	PA	STK
^{(2)} Chicago Bears	13	3	0	.813	338	203	W4
^{(4)} Green Bay Packers	12	4	0	.750	390	266	W3
^{(6)} Tampa Bay Buccaneers	9	7	0	.563	324	280	L1
Minnesota Vikings	5	11	0	.313	290	390	L4
Detroit Lions	2	14	0	.125	270	424	W1

== Playoffs ==
Week	Date	Opponent	Result	Game site	TV Time	Attendance
Wild Card	January 13, 2002	San Francisco 49ers	W 25–15	Lambeau Field	FOX 12:00 pm	59,825
Divisional	January 20, 2002	at St. Louis Rams	L 17–45	Dome at America's Center	FOX 3:15 pm	66,368
