= 1998 Green Bay Packers season =

NFL team season

- Owner: Green Bay Packers, Inc.
- General manager: Ron Wolf
- President: Bob Harlan
- Head coach: Mike Holmgren
- Home stadium: Lambeau Field

Results
- Record: 11–5
- Division place: 2nd NFC Central
- Playoffs: Lost Wild Card Playoffs (at 49ers) 27–30
- All-Pros: 4: WR Antonio Freeman (1st team); DE Reggie White (1st team); SS LeRoy Butler (1st team); KR Roell Preston (2nd team)
- Pro Bowlers: 5: WR Antonio Freeman; TE Mark Chmura; DE Reggie White; SS LeRoy Butler; KR Roell Preston

The 1998 season was the Green Bay Packers' 78th in the National Football League (NFL) and their 80th overall. The Packers entered the 1998 campaign as the two-time defending NFC champions, losing the Super Bowl the year before. The season began with the team attempting to improve on their 13–3 record from 1997, three-peat as National Football Conference (NFC) champions, and win their second Super Bowl in three years.

With an 11–5 record on the season, during which the Minnesota Vikings brought an end to the Packers' 25-game home winning streak in Week 5, Green Bay finished second in the NFC Central, the first time in four years that they had not won the division. They qualified for the playoffs as the NFC's fifth seed, but they were beaten 30–27 by the San Francisco 49ers in the Wild Card round, with Steve Young throwing a 25-yard touchdown pass to Terrell Owens with three seconds left. This was the final season that the Packers would qualify for the postseason during the 1990s; they would not return to the playoffs until 2001. It was also the last season with the team for both head coach Mike Holmgren and Hall of Fame defensive end Reggie White.

== Offseason ==
Additions	Subtractions
P Sean Landeta (Buccaneers)	FS Eugene Robinson (Falcons)
LB Antonio London (Lions)	RB Edgar Bennett (Bears)
S Pat Terrell (Panthers)	CB Doug Evans (Panthers)
OT Matt Willig (Falcons)	DE Gabe Wilkins (49ers)
	OT Bruce Wilkerson (Raiders)
	WR Terry Mickens (Raiders)
	G Aaron Taylor (Chargers)
	QB Steve Bono (Rams)
	WR Don Beebe (retirement)
	P Craig Hentrich (Oilers)

=== 1998 NFL draft ===
Notably, the Packers drafted future all-pro quarterback Matt Hasselbeck in the 6th round (187th overall).

1998 Green Bay Packers draft
Round	Pick	Player	Position	College	Notes
1	19	Vonnie Holliday	Defensive end	North Carolina	
3	90	Jonathan Brown	Defensive end	Tennessee	
4	121	Roosevelt Blackmon	Cornerback	Morris Brown	
5	150	Corey Bradford	Wide receiver	Jackson State	
6	156	Scott McGarrahan	Safety	New Mexico	
6	187	Matt Hasselbeck *	Quarterback	Boston College	
7	218	Edwin Watson	Running back	Purdue	
Made roster * Made at least one Pro Bowl during career

=== Supplemental draft ===
1998 Green Bay Packers draft
Round	Pick	Player	Position	College	Notes
2	--	Mike Wahle *	Offensive tackle	Navy	
Made roster * Made at least one Pro Bowl during career

=== Undrafted free agents ===
1998 undrafted free agents of note
Player	Position	College
Magic Benton	Wide receiver	Miami (FL)
Mike Bowman	Wide receiver	Valdosta State
Keaton Cromartie	Linebacker	Tulane
Jason Davis	Punter	Oklahoma State
Terrell Farley	Cornerback	Nebraska
David Hoelscher	Defensive end	Eastern Kentucky
Chris McCoy	Running back	Navy
Jude Waddy	Linebacker	William & Mary

== Staff ==
1998 Green Bay Packers staff
Front office: President/Chief Executive Officer – Bob Harlan; Executive vice president/general manager – Ron Wolf; Director of player personnel – Ted Thompson; Director of pro personnel – Reggie McKenzie; Director of college scouting – John Dorsey; Pro personnel assistant – Will Lewis; Head coaches: Head coach – Mike Holmgren; Offensive coaches: Offensive coordinator – Sherman Lewis; Quarterbacks – Andy Reid; Running backs – Harry Sydney; Wide receivers – Nolan Cromwell; Offensive line – Tom Lovat; Assistant offensive line/tight ends – Mike Sherman; Offensive assistant/quality control – Gary Reynolds	Defensive coaches: Defensive coordinator – Fritz Shurmur; Defensive line – Larry Brooks; Linebackers – Jim Lind; Defensive backs/secondary – Bob Valesente; Defensive assistant/quality control – Ken Flajole; Special teams coaches: Special teams – Johnny Holland; Strength and conditioning: Strength and conditioning – Kent Johnston; Assistant strength and conditioning – Barry Rubin

== Roster ==
1998 Green Bay Packers roster
Quarterbacks: 4 Brett Favre; 13 Rick Mirer; 18 Doug Pederson; Running backs: 27 Michael Blair; 33 William Henderson FB; 22 Darick Holmes; 48 Jim Kitts FB; 25 Dorsey Levens; Wide receivers: 85 Corey Bradford; 87 Robert Brooks; 16 Russell Copeland; 86 Antonio Freeman; 82 Brian Manning; 80 Derrick Mayes; 88 Roell Preston RS; Tight ends: 89 Mark Chmura; 81 Tyrone Davis; 47 Scott Galbraith; 83 Jeff Thomason	Offensive linemen: 70 Joe Andruzzi G; 67 Jeff Dellenbach C; 72 Earl Dotson OT; 58 Mike Flanagan C; 62 Marco Rivera G; 63 Adam Timmerman G; 78 Ross Verba OT; 68 Mike Wahle G; 76 Matt Willig OT; Defensive linemen: 96 Vaughn Booker DE; 93 Gilbert Brown DT; 91 Jonathan Brown DE; 71 Santana Dotson DT; 90 Vonnie Holliday DE; 94 Bob Kuberski DT; 98 Billy Lyon DT; 95 Keith McKenzie DE; 92 Reggie White DE	Linebackers: 55 Bernardo Harris MLB; 56 Lamont Hollinquest OLB; 53 George Koonce OLB; 51 Brian Williams OLB; Defensive backs: 36 LeRoy Butler SS; 45 Kerry Cooks SS; 43 Scott McGarrahan SS; 21 Craig Newsome CB; 39 Mike Prior FS; 42 Darren Sharper FS; 31 Rod Smith CB; 40 Pat Terrell FS; 37 Tyrone Williams CB; Special teams: 60 Rob Davis LS; 7 Sean Landeta P; 8 Ryan Longwell K	Injured Reserve: 50 Anthony Hicks LB (IR); 32 Travis Jervey RB (IR); 57 Antonio London OLB (IR); -- Ronnie McAda QB (Military Reserve); 41 Chris McCoy RB (Military Reserve); 77 John Michels LT (IR); 28 Roderick Mullen CB (IR); 84 Bill Schroeder WR (IR); 99 Jermaine Smith DT (NF-inj.); 54 Jude Waddy MLB (Susp.); 35 Edwin Watson RB (IR); 52 Frank Winters C (IR) C; Practice squad: 11 Matt Hasselbeck QB; -- Taj Johnson WR; 23 Denorse Mosley CB; -- Jim Nelson MLB; -- Pat Palmer WR; 53 active, 12 inactive, 5 practice squad rookies in italics

== Schedule ==
=== Preseason ===
In the 1998 NFL Preseason, the Packers traveled to Japan to face off against the Kansas City Chiefs at the Tokyo Dome. It was the ninth American Bowl game to be staged at the 48,000 capacity stadium.

Week	Date	Opponent	Result	Record	Venue	Attendance
1	August 1	Kansas City Chiefs	**W** 27–24	1–0	Tokyo Dome	42,018
2	August 8	New Orleans Saints	**W** 31–7	2–0	Lambeau Field	60,080
3	August 16	Oakland Raiders	**L** 21–27	2–1	Lambeau Field	60,078
4	August 24	at Denver Broncos	**L** 31–34	2–2	Mile High Stadium	73,183
5	August 28	at Miami Dolphins	**L** 7–21	2–3	Pro Player Stadium	61,915

=== Regular season ===
The Packers finished the 1998 regular with an 11–5 record in 2nd place in the NFC Central (qualifying for an NFC Wild Card playoff game), behind the Randall Cunningham-led 15–1 Vikings.

Week	Date	Opponent	Result	Record	Venue	Attendance
1	September 6	**Detroit Lions**	**W** 38–19	1–0	Lambeau Field	60,102
2	September 13	**Tampa Bay Buccaneers**	**W** 23–15	2–0	Lambeau Field	60,124
3	September 20	at Cincinnati Bengals	**W** 13–6	3–0	Cinergy Field	56,346
4	September 27	at Carolina Panthers	**W** 37–30	4–0	Ericsson Stadium	69,723
5	October 5	**Minnesota Vikings**	**L** 24–37	4–1	Lambeau Field	59,849
6	Bye					
7	October 15	at **Detroit Lions**	**L** 20–27	4–2	Pontiac Silverdome	77,932
8	October 25	Baltimore Ravens	**W** 28–10	5–2	Lambeau Field	59,860
9	November 1	San Francisco 49ers	**W** 36–22	6–2	Lambeau Field	59,794
10	November 9	at Pittsburgh Steelers	**L** 20–27	6–3	Three Rivers Stadium	60,507
11	November 15	at New York Giants	**W** 37–3	7–3	Giants Stadium	76,272
12	November 22	at **Minnesota Vikings**	**L** 14–28	7–4	Hubert H. Humphrey Metrodome	64,471
13	November 29	Philadelphia Eagles	**W** 24–16	8–4	Lambeau Field	59,862
14	December 7	at **Tampa Bay Buccaneers**	**L** 22–24	8–5	Raymond James Stadium	65,497
15	December 13	**Chicago Bears**	**W** 26–20	9–5	Lambeau Field	59,813
16	December 20	Tennessee Oilers	**W** 30–22	10–5	Lambeau Field	59,888
17	December 27	at **Chicago Bears**	**W** 16–13	11–5	Soldier Field	58,393

Note: Intra-division opponents are in bold text

== Playoffs ==
Playoff round	Date	Opponent (seed)	Result	Record	Game site	Recap
Wild Card	January 3, 1999	San Francisco 49ers (4)	L 27–30	0–1	Candlestick Park	

== Standings ==
NFC Central
	W	L	T	PCT	PF	PA	STK
^{(1)} Minnesota Vikings	15	1	0	.938	556	296	W8
^{(5)} Green Bay Packers	11	5	0	.688	408	319	W3
Tampa Bay Buccaneers	8	8	0	.500	314	295	W1
Detroit Lions	5	11	0	.313	306	378	L4
Chicago Bears	4	12	0	.250	276	368	L1

== Season summary ==
=== Week 1 ===
Week One: Detroit Lions (0–0) at Green Bay Packers (0–0)

Quarter	1	2	3	4	Total
Lions	3	3	13	0	19
Packers	10	7	7	14	38

at Lambeau Field, Green Bay, Wisconsin

- Date: September 6, 1998
- Game time: 1:00 p.m. EST
- Game weather: 74 °F (23 °C)
- Game attendance: 60,102
- TV announcers (Fox): Dick Stockton and Matt Millen
- Pro-Football-Reference.com, The Football Database

Game information

First quarter

- GB – Ryan Longwell 32-yard field goal, 9:19. Packers 3–0. Drive: 11 plays, 58 yards, 5:41.
- GB – LeRoy Butler 32-yard interception return (Ryan Longwell kick), 6:23. Packers 10–0.
- DET – Jason Hanson 47-yard field goal, 1:10. Packers 10–3. Drive: 10 plays, 51 yards, 5:13.

Second quarter

- GB – Dorsey Levens 4-yard run (Ryan Longwell kick), 9:40. Packers 17–3. Drive: 13 plays, 80 yards, 6:30.
- DET – Jason Hanson 43-yard field goal. Packers 17–6. Drive: 11 plays, 63 yards, 2:11.

Third quarter

- DET – Herman Moore 25-yard pass from Scott Mitchell (pass failed), 12:39. Packers 17–12. Drive: 7 plays, 50 yards, 2:21.
- GB – Antonio Freeman 6-yard pass from Brett Favre (Ryan Longwell kick), 0:17. Packers 24–12. Drive: 18 plays, 85 yards, 9:34.
- DET – Terry Fair 101-yard kickoff return (Jason Hanson kick), 0:00. Packers 24–19.

Fourth quarter

- GB – Roell Preston 100-yard kickoff return (Ryan Longwell kick), 14:38. Packers 31–19.
- GB – Antonio Freeman 84-yard pass from Brett Favre (Ryan Longwell kick), 1:53. Packers 38–19. Drive: 3 plays, 86 yards, 0:29.

Top passers

- DET – Scott Mitchell – 23/44, 248 yards, TD, INT
- GB – Brett Favre – 24/32, 277 yards, 2 TD

Top rushers

- DET – Barry Sanders – 17 rushes, 70 yards
- GB – Dorsey Levens – 25 rushes, 59 yards, TD

Top receivers

- DET – Herman Moore – 9 receptions, 100 yards, TD
- GB – Antonio Freeman – 4 receptions, 110 yards, 2 TD

=== Week 5: vs Minnesota Vikings ===
Week 5: Minnesota Vikings at Green Bay Packers – Game summary

Quarter	1	2	3	4	Total
Vikings	3	21	3	10	37
Packers	0	10	0	14	24

at Lambeau Field, Green Bay, Wisconsin

- Date: October 5
- Game time: 7:20 p.m. CT
- Game weather: Light fog, scattered showers, 58 °F (14 °C)
- Game attendance: 59,849
- Referee: Gerry Austin (34)
- TV announcers (ABC): Al Michaels, Dan Dierdorf & Boomer Esiason
- Recap, Game Book

Game information

First quarter

- MIN – Gary Anderson 33-yard field goal, 3:14. Vikings 3–0. Drive: 14 plays, 65 yards, 7:00.

Second quarter

- GB – Ryan Longwell 40-yard field goal, 14:53. Tied 3–3. Drive: 10 plays, 45 yards, 3:21.
- MIN – Jake Reed 56-yard pass from Randall Cunningham (Gary Anderson kick), 12:09. Vikings 10–3. Drive: 5 plays, 80 yards, 2:44.
- GB – Roell Preston 101-yard kick return (Ryan Longwell kick), 11:52. Tied 10–10. Drive: 0 plays, 0 yards, 0:17.
- MIN – Randy Moss 52-yard pass from Randall Cunningham (Gary Anderson kick), 9:56. Vikings 17–10. Drive: 4 plays, 76 yards, 1:56.
- MIN – Robert Smith 24-yard pass from Randall Cunningham (Gary Anderson kick), 4:43. Vikings 24–10. Drive: 4 plays, 65 yards, 0:47.

Third quarter

- MIN – Gary Anderson 25-yard field goal, 11:17. Vikings 27–10. Drive: 9 plays, 48 yards, 3:43.

Fourth quarter

- MIN – Gary Anderson 25-yard field goal, 13:31. Vikings 30–10. Drive: 13 plays, 79 yards, 7:21.
- MIN – Randy Moss 44-yard pass from Randall Cunningham (Gary Anderson kick), 10:16. Vikings 37–10. Drive: 4 plays, 57 yards, 2:20.
- GB – Tyrone Davis 11-yard pass from Doug Pederson (Ryan Longwell kick), 3:03. Vikings 37–17. Drive: 6 plays, 65 yards, 1:17.
- GB – Bill Schroeder 16-yard pass from Doug Pederson (Ryan Longwell kick), 0:49. Vikings 37–24. Drive: 11 plays, 58 yards, 2:18.

Top passers

- MIN – Randall Cunningham – 20/32, 442 yards, 4 TD
- GB – Brett Favre – 13/23, 114 yards, 3 INT

Top rushers

- MIN – Robert Smith – 25 rushes, 78 yards
- GB – Travis Jervey – 8 rushes, 55 yards

Top receivers

- MIN – Randy Moss – 5 receptions, 190 yards, 2 TD
- GB – Antonio Freeman – 3 receptions, 53 yards

== Playoffs ==
=== NFC Wild Card Playoff ===
San Francisco 49ers 30, Green Bay Packers 27

Quarter	1	2	3	4	Total
Packers	3	14	0	10	27
49ers	7	3	10	10	30

at 3Com Park, San Francisco

- Game time: 4:00 p.m. EST/1:00 p.m. PST
- Game weather: 60 °F (16 °C), clear
- Game attendance: 66,506
- Referee: Gerald Austin
- TV announcers (Fox): Pat Summerall (play-by-play) and John Madden (color commentator)

The 49ers defeated the Packers, who had eliminated them from the playoffs in each of the past 3 seasons, in one of the wildest back-and-forth games in league playoff history. After a Brett Favre touchdown to Antonio Freeman with 1:55 to go, Steve Young began driving the Niners down field; Jerry Rice had just one catch for six yards all game, coming on this drive and when he fumbled the ball, but was ruled down by contact, but instant replay was not available at the time. The next play, Young's pass fell incomplete and was initially ruled intercepted. With eight seconds to go, Young from the Packers 25 dropped back, momentarily stumbled, then launched the ball where it was caught in the end zone by Terrell Owens, who had dropped several catches during the game.

== Awards and records ==
- Brett Favre, NFL leader, passing yards (4,212)
- Brett Favre, NFC leader, attempts (551)
- Brett Favre, NFC leader, completions (347)
- Brett Favre, NFC leader, pass completion percentage (63)
- Brett Favre, NFC leader (tied), interceptions (23)
- Reggie White, National Football League Defensive Player of the Year Award
- Reggie White, NFC leader, sacks (16.0)

=== Milestones ===
- Brett Favre, second 4,000-yard passing season (finished season with 4,212)
