= Jim Flanigan =

American football player (born 1971)

No. 68, 99, 75, 55, 79
- Position: Defensive tackle

Personal information
- Born: August 27, 1971 (age 55); Green Bay, Wisconsin, U.S.
- Listed height: 6 ft 2 in (1.88 m)
- Listed weight: 290 lb (132 kg)

Career information
- High school: Southern Door (Brussels, Wisconsin)
- College: Notre Dame
- NFL draft: 1994: 3rd round, 74th overall pick

Career history
- Chicago Bears (1994–2000); Green Bay Packers (2001); San Francisco 49ers (2002); Philadelphia Eagles (2003)

Awards and highlights
- Walter Payton NFL Man of the Year (2000)

Career NFL statistics
- Tackles: 342
- Sacks: 46
- Interceptions: 1
- Fumble recoveries: 7
- Receiving touchdowns: 3
- Stats at Pro Football Reference

James Michael Flanigan Jr. (born August 27, 1971) is an American former professional football player who was a defensive tackle in the National Football League (NFL) from 1994 to 2003. Most of his success came when he was with the Chicago Bears from 1994 to 2000. He was selected by the Bears in the third round of the 1994 NFL draft. He played college football for the Notre Dame Fighting Irish. His father, Jim Flanigan, Sr., also played in the NFL for the Green Bay Packers. Flanigan also played for the Philadelphia Eagles, Packers and San Francisco 49ers during his NFL career.

During his tenure with the Bears, primarily as a defensive tackle, he also saw limited action on offense as a tight end in short-yardage situations. From the 1994 through 1996 seasons, he made four receptions for four touchdowns. He also caught a surprise pass for the first two-point conversion in Bears' history on September 1, 1997, against the Packers.

== NFL career statistics ==
Legend
**Bold**	Career high

Year	Team	Games		Tackles				Interceptions				Fumbles			
Year	Team	GP	GS	Comb	Solo	Ast	Sck	Int	Yds	TD	Lng	FF	FR	Yds	TD
1994	CHI	14	0	11	10	1	0.0	0	0	0	0	0	0	0	0
1995	CHI	16	12	49	**39**	10	**11.0**	0	0	0	0	0	1	0	0
1996	CHI	14	14	41	36	5	5.0	0	0	0	0	0	0	0	0
1997	CHI	16	16	**50**	38	12	6.0	0	0	0	0	**2**	**3**	**3**	0
1998	CHI	16	16	46	32	**14**	8.5	0	0	0	0	1	1	0	0
1999	CHI	16	16	43	35	8	6.0	**1**	**6**	0	**6**	1	1	0	0
2000	CHI	16	14	46	33	13	4.0	0	0	0	0	0	1	0	0
2001	GNB	16	8	40	26	**14**	4.5	0	0	0	0	0	0	0	0
2002	SFO	15	1	12	7	5	1.0	0	0	0	0	0	0	0	0
2003	PHI	6	0	4	4	0	0.0	0	0	0	0	0	0	0	0
Career		145	97	342	260	82	46.0	1	6	0	6	4	7	3	0
