= Bhawoh Jue =

Liberian gridiron football player (born 1979)

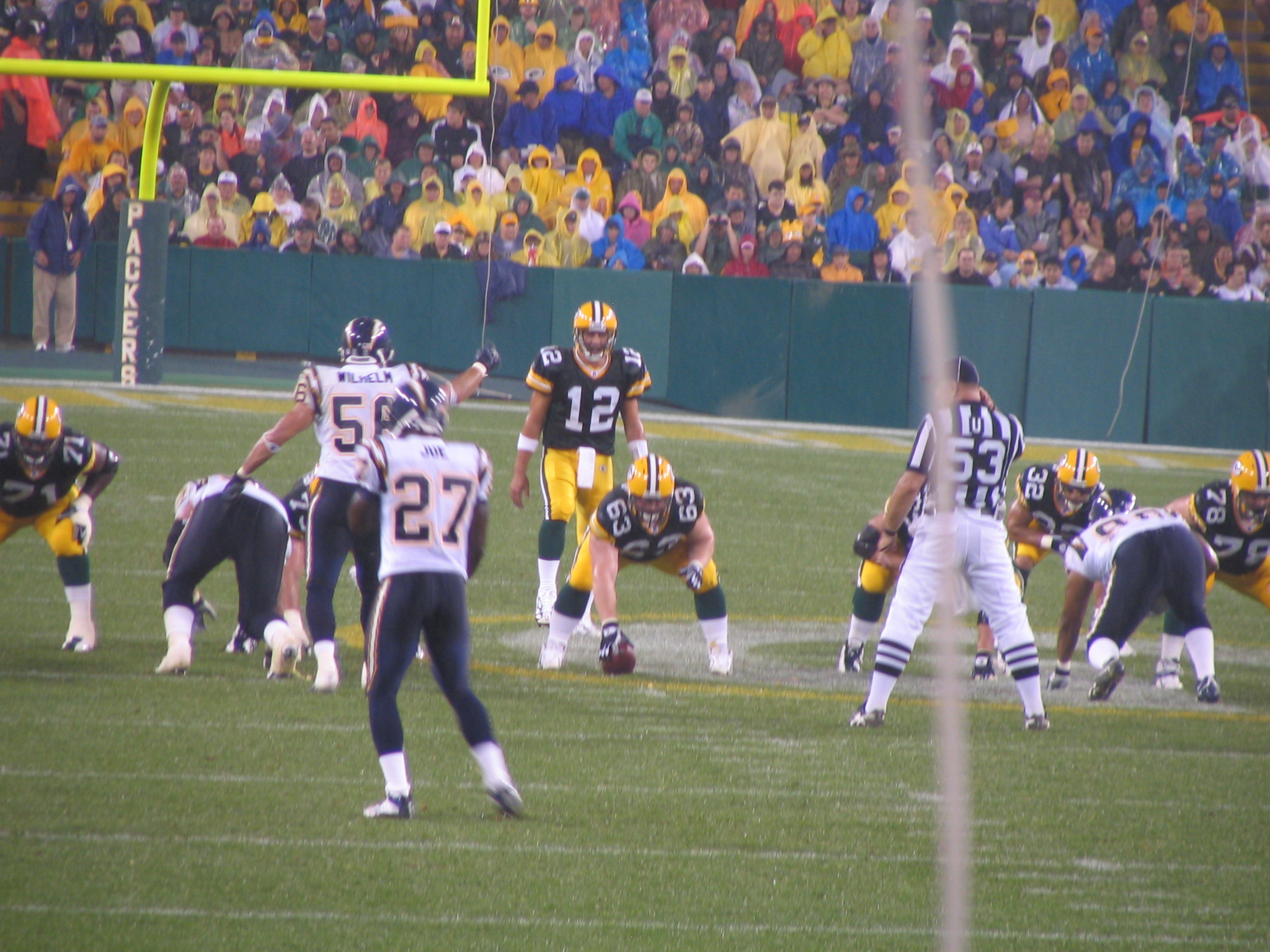
- Jue (27) in 2005

No. 21, 27, 34, 33
- Position: Safety

Personal information
- Born: May 24, 1979 (age 47); Monrovia, Liberia
- Listed height: 6 ft 0 in (1.83 m)
- Listed weight: 200 lb (91 kg)

Career information
- High school: Chantilly (Chantilly, Virginia)
- College: Penn State
- NFL draft: 2001: 3rd round, 71st overall pick

Career history
- Green Bay Packers (2001–2004); San Diego Chargers (2005–2006); St. Louis Rams (2007); Arizona Cardinals (2007); Florida Tuskers (2009)*
- * Offseason or practice squad member only

Career NFL statistics
- Total tackles: 184
- Sacks: 1.5
- Forced fumbles: 2
- Pass deflections: 26
- Interceptions: 6
- Stats at Pro Football Reference

Bhawoh Papi Jue (/ˌbaʊ ˈdʒuː/; born May 24, 1979) is a Liberian former professional American football safety. He was originally selected by the Green Bay Packers in the third round of the 2001 NFL draft. He played college football for the Penn State Nittany Lions.

He was also a member of the San Diego Chargers, St. Louis Rams, Arizona Cardinals, and Florida Tuskers. He is distinguished as being the first Liberian to play in the National Football League (NFL).

== Early life ==
Jue and his mother immigrated from Liberia to the US when he was a year old. He lived in California and Rhode Island before settling in Virginia.

Jue attended Chantilly High School in Chantilly, Virginia, where he was a two-sport letterman in American football and basketball. He also ran track and field. As a senior, he helped lead Chantilly to the 1996 Virginia State AAA Football title, making 73 tackles and 3 interceptions as a defensive back and rushing for over 1,200 yards and 21 touchdowns as a tailback. That year, he was named a USA Today All-America selection, and Associated Press first-team All-State on both offense and defense. He also earned Region Defensive Player of the Year, and Conference Player of the Year.

== College career ==
Jue attended Penn State University, from 1997 to 2001. He finished his career there with 99 tackles, 7 interceptions and 28 passes defended. As the Nittany Lion's starting left cornerback, he was named Honorable Mention All-Big Ten in 2000 and was selected to play in the 2001 Senior Bowl. During his college career, he also played in the Alamo Bowl and the Outback Bowl. Jue was roommates with three other future NFLers at Penn State: Omar Easy, John Gilmore and Tony Stewart.

== NFL career ==
=== 2001 NFL draft ===
Jue was selected with the 71st pick in the third round of the 2001 NFL draft by the Green Bay Packers after his college career.

Pre-draft measurables
Height	Weight	Arm length	Hand span	40-yard dash	10-yard split	20-yard split	20-yard shuttle	Three-cone drill	Vertical jump	Broad jump
6 ft 0 1/4 in (1.84 m)	199 lb (90 kg)	31 in (0.79 m)	8 1/2 in (0.22 m)	4.52 s	1.59 s	2.62 s	4.27 s	7.21 s	34.5 in (0.88 m)	9 ft 5 in (2.87 m)
All values from NFL Combine

=== Green Bay Packers ===
Jue began the season switching between cornerback and safety, but was eventually permanently placed as a safety when he took over for the injured LeRoy Butler midway through the season. He totaled forty-six tackles with two interceptions, and was named the Packers' Defensive Rookie of the Year. His sophomore season was limited to four games after suffering various injuries that put him on injured reserve early in the year. In 2003, he played in all games, primarily on special teams and had a career best 1.5 sacks, coupled with twenty-seven solo tackles. The following season saw him make forty-two tackles with an interception.

=== San Diego Chargers ===
After the 2004 season, Jue left to sign with the San Diego Chargers. He set new career highs with forty-seven tackles and three interceptions. He spent most of the 2006 season as a reserve due to injury. On 1 September 2007, they released him.

=== St. Louis Rams ===
On 10 October 2007, Jue signed with the St. Louis Rams. He was cut by the St. Louis Rams on 6 November 2007.

== NFL career statistics ==
Legend
**Bold**	Career high

=== Regular season ===
Year	Team	Games		Tackles					Interceptions					Fumbles			
Year	Team	GP	GS	Cmb	Solo	Ast	Sck	TFL	Int	Yds	TD	Lng	PD	FF	FR	Yds	TD
2001	GNB	15	7	**47**	34	**13**	0.0	0	2	**35**	0	**35**	4	**1**	0	0	0
2002	GNB	4	0	0	0	0	0.0	0	0	0	0	0	1	0	**1**	0	0
2003	GNB	**16**	0	33	29	4	**1.5**	**2**	0	0	0	0	3	**1**	0	0	0
2004	GNB	**16**	4	42	**38**	4	0.0	0	1	23	0	23	5	0	0	0	0
2005	SDG	14	**14**	**47**	34	**13**	0.0	0	**3**	28	0	20	**8**	0	0	0	0
2006	SDG	12	2	15	9	6	0.0	0	0	0	0	0	5	0	0	0	0
2007	ARI	1	0	0	0	0	0.0	0	0	0	0	0	0	0	0	0	0
2007	STL	1	0	0	0	0	0.0	0	0	0	0	0	0	0	0	0	0
		79	27	184	144	40	1.5	2	6	86	0	35	26	2	1	0	0

=== Playoffs ===
Year	Team	Games		Tackles					Interceptions					Fumbles			
Year	Team	GP	GS	Cmb	Solo	Ast	Sck	TFL	Int	Yds	TD	Lng	PD	FF	FR	Yds	TD
2001	GNB	**2**	0	3	3	0	0.0	0	0	0	0	0	**1**	0	0	0	0
2003	GNB	**2**	0	**5**	**5**	0	**1.0**	**1**	0	0	0	0	**1**	0	0	0	0
2004	GNB	1	0	1	1	0	0.0	0	0	0	0	0	0	0	0	0	0
2006	SDG	1	0	1	1	0	0.0	0	0	0	0	0	0	0	0	0	0
		6	0	10	10	0	1.0	1	0	0	0	0	2	0	0	0	0

== Personal ==
His name Bhawoh (pronounced "bau") means “very powerful man.” Jue's name is easily mispronounced, lending him the nickname of au jus.
