= Tyrone Williams (cornerback) =

American football player (born 1973)

No. 37
- Position: Cornerback

Personal information
- Born: May 31, 1973 (age 53); Bradenton, Florida, U.S.
- Listed height: 5 ft 11 in (1.80 m)
- Listed weight: 193 lb (88 kg)

Career information
- High school: Manatee (Bradenton)
- College: Nebraska
- NFL draft: 1996: 3rd round, 93rd overall pick

Career history
- Green Bay Packers (1996–2002); Atlanta Falcons (2003); Dallas Cowboys (2004)

Awards and highlights
- Super Bowl champion (XXXI); 2× National champion (1994, 1995); First-team All-Big Eight (1995); Big Eight Co-Defensive Newcomer-of-the-Year (1993)

Career NFL statistics
- Tackles: 469
- Interceptions: 19
- Touchdowns: 2
- Stats at Pro Football Reference

Upton Tyrone Williams (born May 31, 1973) is an American former professional football player who was a cornerback in the National Football League (NFL) for the Green Bay Packers, Atlanta Falcons and Dallas Cowboys. He played college football at the University of Nebraska–Lincoln.

== Early life ==
Williams attended Manatee High School, where he practiced football, basketball and track. In football, he was a two-way player at running back and cornerback. As a senior, he contributed to the team having a 12–1 record, along with teammate Tommie Frazier at quarterback.

== College career ==
He accepted a football scholarship from the University of Nebraska–Lincoln. He was forced to sit out his freshman season, due to the NCAA's Proposition 48 regulation. As a sophomore, he became the starter at right cornerback in the fourth game, collecting 29 tackles (tenth on the team), 14 solo tackles, one interception and 3 passes defensed (led the team), while being was named Big Eight Co-Defensive Newcomer-of-the-Year as the Huskers defensive player of the year. In the national championship game against Florida State University, he had career highs with 9 tackles (8 solo) and 3 passes defensed.

As a junior, he missed the game against West Virginia University. He finished with 38 tackles (eleventh on the team), 31 solo tackles, 3 interceptions (second on the team) and 5 passes defensed (second on the team). As a senior, he tallied 28 tackles (19 solo), one tackle for loss, one interception, 3 passes defensed, one quarterback hurry and one fumble recovery.

During his college career he recorded 95 tackles, 5 interceptions and 11 passes defensed, while contributing to a 36–1 record, 2 national championships and 3 Big Eight Conference titles.

In 2006, he was inducted into the Nebraska Football Hall of Fame.

== Professional career ==
=== Green Bay Packers ===
Williams was selected by the Green Bay Packers in the third round (93rd overall) of the 1996 NFL draft. As a rookie reserve behind Doug Evans, he made 25 tackles during the regular season and 3 more in the playoffs. He also had 4 passes defensed during the playoffs and made a critical interception late in the first half of the Packers 30-13 NFC championship win over the Carolina Panthers. He was a reserve for the Super Bowl XXXI winning team. Williams became the first NFL player to be sentenced to prison, stemming from a shooting incident from 1994, while he was still a student at Nebraska; he pleaded no contest to a felony charge of "unlawfully discharging a gun and misdemeanor assault".

In 1997, he became a full time starter at left cornerback after Craig Newsome suffered a left knee injury in the season opener. In 1998, he was named the starter at right cornerback alongside Newsome and led the team with 5 interceptions.

From 1998 to 2001, he posted at least 4 interceptions every season. He appeared in 111 out of 112 games with 94 starts, finishing with 445 tackles, 19 interceptions and 92 passes defensed.

=== Atlanta Falcons ===
On March 16, 2003, he was signed as a free agent by the Atlanta Falcons to a four-year $10.3 million contract with a $3 million signing bonus, to replace Ashley Ambrose at right cornerback. He reported overweight for training camp and was suspended for the fifth game against the Minnesota Vikings.

Williams started in only six games and was benched for the entire second half of the season, being declared inactive for the final nine contests. He registered 20 tackles, 2 passes defensed and no interceptions. He was released on June 2, 2004.

=== Dallas Cowboys ===
On September 30, 2004, he was signed by the Dallas Cowboys as a free agent for depth purposes, after Pete Hunter was lost for the season with a left knee injury. He passed Jacques Reeves on the depth chart, starting 2 games at right cornerback, making 6 tackles and one sack. On November 13, he was waived with a hamstring injury he suffered in the seventh game against the Detroit Lions and was later placed on the injured reserve list on November 15. He was released on December 14.

== NFL career statistics ==
Legend
	Won the Super Bowl
**Bold**	Career high

=== Regular season ===
Year	Team	Games		Tackles				Interceptions				Fumbles			
Year	Team	GP	GS	Comb	Solo	Ast	Sck	Int	Yds	TD	Lng	FF	FR	Yds	TD
1996	GB	16	0	25	22	3	0.0	0	0	0	0	0	1	0	0
1997	GB	16	15	66	49	**17**	0.0	1	0	0	0	**2**	0	0	0
1998	GB	16	16	69	61	8	0.0	**5**	40	0	15	0	0	0	0
1999	GB	16	16	65	53	12	0.0	4	12	0	12	0	**2**	**12**	0
2000	GB	16	16	59	51	8	0.0	4	105	**1**	46	0	0	0	0
2001	GB	16	16	**89**	**77**	12	0.0	4	**117**	**1**	**69**	1	1	0	0
2002	GB	15	15	69	60	9	**1.0**	1	0	0	0	0	0	0	0
2003	ATL	6	6	20	18	2	0.0	0	0	0	0	0	0	0	0
2004	DAL	3	2	7	7	0	**1.0**	0	0	0	0	0	0	0	0
		120	102	469	398	71	2.0	19	274	2	69	3	4	12	0

=== Playoffs ===
Year	Team	Games		Tackles				Interceptions				Fumbles			
Year	Team	GP	GS	Comb	Solo	Ast	Sck	Int	Yds	TD	Lng	FF	FR	Yds	TD
1996	GB	3	0	2	2	0	0.0	**1**	0	0	0	0	0	0	0
1997	GB	3	3	**9**	**8**	**1**	0.0	**1**	**14**	0	**14**	0	**1**	0	0
1998	GB	1	1	3	3	0	0.0	0	0	0	0	0	0	0	0
2001	GB	2	2	3	3	0	0.0	**1**	0	0	0	0	0	0	0
2002	GB	1	1	5	5	0	0.0	0	0	0	0	0	0	0	0
		10	7	22	21	1	0.0	3	14	0	14	0	1	0	0

== Personal life ==
In 2007, Williams pleaded no contest to charges of battery on a law enforcement officer and assault. He was sentenced to 35 days in jail and a year of probation. In 2009, Williams was arrested in conjunction with threatening his former wife.

Williams founded a sports management company named TruPros and got divorced.
