= Bill Schroeder (wide receiver) =

American football player (born 1971)

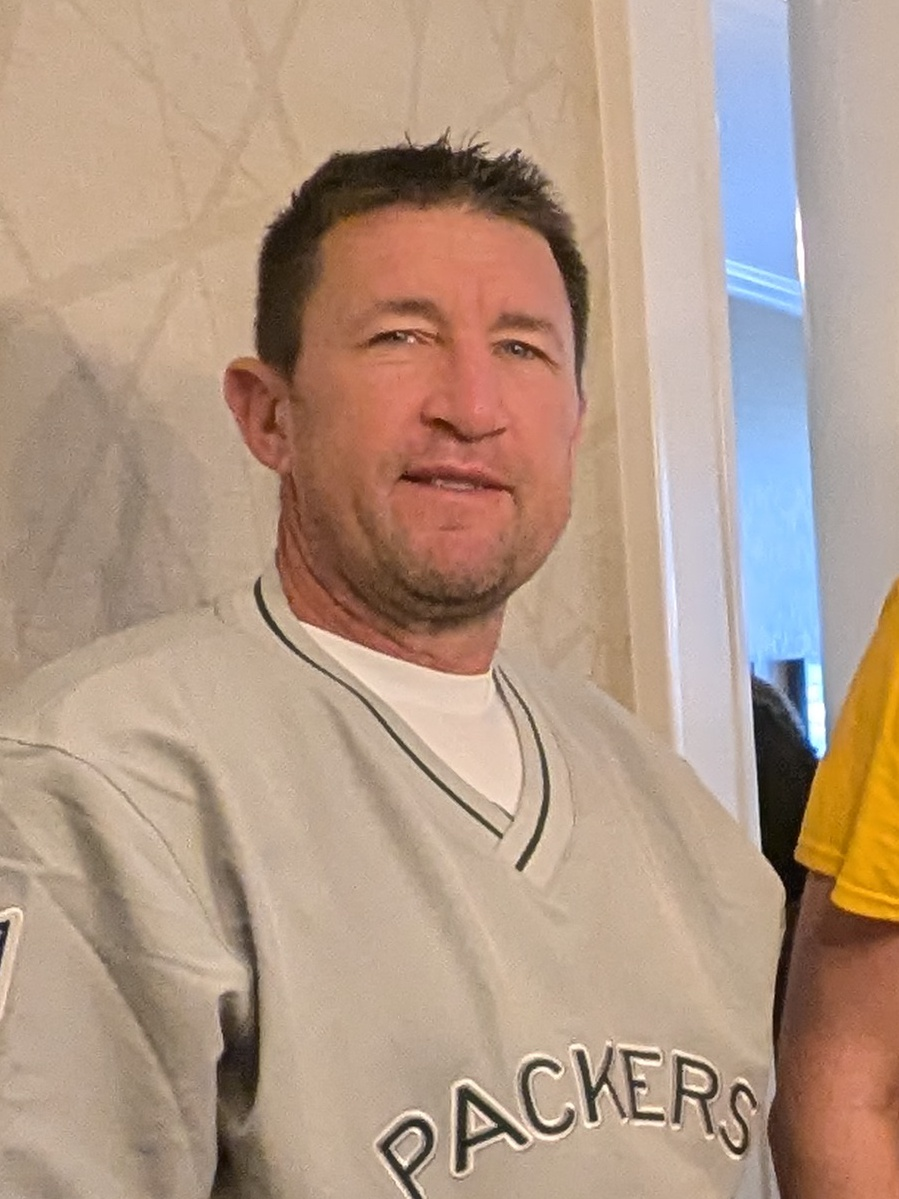
- Schroeder in 2025

No. 19, 84, 11
- Position: Wide receiver

Personal information
- Born: January 9, 1971 (age 55); Eau Claire, Wisconsin, U.S.
- Listed height: 6 ft 3 in (1.91 m)
- Listed weight: 200 lb (91 kg)

Career information
- High school: Sheboygan South (Sheboygan, Wisconsin)
- College: Wisconsin–La Crosse
- NFL draft: 1994: 6th round, 181st overall pick

Career history
- Green Bay Packers (1994); New England Patriots (1995); Green Bay Packers (1996–2001); → Rhein Fire (1997); Detroit Lions (2002–2003); Tampa Bay Buccaneers (2004)

Awards and highlights
- Super Bowl champion (XXXI)

Career NFL statistics
- Receptions: 304
- Receiving yards: 4,583
- Receiving touchdowns: 28
- Stats at Pro Football Reference

William Fredrich Schroeder (born January 9, 1971) is an American former professional football player who was a wide receiver in the National Football League (NFL). He played college football for the Wisconsin–La Crosse Eagles.

== College career ==
Schroeder attended Sheboygan South High School and then went on to the University of Wisconsin–La Crosse, where he starred in track and field. Schroeder joined their Eagle football team in only his fifth year of college after exhausting his eligibility to compete in track. Despite playing only one year, Schroeder's athleticism (4.26 second 40-yard dash and 44 inch vertical leap) drew the attention of NFL scouts.

== Professional career ==
Schroeder was selected in the sixth round (181st overall) of the 1994 NFL draft by the Green Bay Packers. He would wear jersey number 84. Schroeder spent the 1994 season on the practice squad, but was activated in the playoffs, though he did not have any receptions. The following year, he was traded to the New England Patriots, but suffered a broken foot before he was able to play a single down and was released. Then he went back to Green Bay, and after making the practice squad, he spent some time playing for NFL Europe before he finally made the active roster in the 1997 season. That year, he was the team's leading punt and kick returner as they advanced to Super Bowl XXXII. He went on to play until 2004. His best statistical season was 1999, when he caught 74 passes for 1,051 yards and 5 touchdowns. He last played with the Tampa Bay Buccaneers in 2004, wearing number 11 with the team as Joey Galloway had worn his traditional number of 84. On May 22, 2008, Schroeder informed Green Bay Packers general manager Ted Thompson that he would like to retire as a Packer. He signed with the Packers on May 21, 2008, and retired the next day. Schroeder was affectionately known as "The Sheboygan Flash", La Crosse Lightning, "Pro Bowl Bill" to many Packer fans.

== NFL career statistics ==
=== Regular season ===
Year	Team	Games		Receiving					Fumbles	
Year	Team	GP	GS	Rec	Yds	Avg	Lng	TD	FUM	Lost
1997	GB	15	1	2	15	7.5	8	1	4	3
1998	GB	13	3	31	452	14.6	46	1	1	0
1999	GB	16	16	74	1,051	14.2	51	5	3	1
2000	GB	16	16	65	999	15.4	55T	4	1	1
2001	GB	14	14	53	918	17.3	67T	9	1	0
2002	DET	14	13	36	595	16.5	46	5	0	0
2003	DET	16	13	36	397	11.0	26	2	0	0
2004	TB	7	2	7	156	22.3	54	1	2	0
Total		111	78	304	4,583	15.1	67	28	12	5
