= Edwin Watson (American football) =

American football player (born 1976)

Edwin David "Eddie" Watson II (born September 29, 1976) is an American former professional football running back in the National Football League (NFL) who played for the Philadelphia Eagles. He played college football for the Purdue Boilermakers. He also played in NFL Europe for the Berlin Thunder.he also bounced around multiple teams practice squads
