= Gary Reynolds =

American football coach (1966–2020)

Profile
- Position: Offensive assistant of quality control

Personal information
- Born: October 15, 1966
- Died: August 20, 2020 (aged 53)

Career information
- College: Texas A&M

Career history
- Texas A&M University; University of Tennessee; Green Bay Packers (1993–1998); Seattle Seahawks

Gary Reynolds (October 15, 1966 – August 20, 2020) was an American professional football coach in the National Football League (NFL) who served as the offensive assistant of quality control for the Seattle Seahawks, whom he started working for in 1999. He was also the Director of Football Operations/Research and Development at Texas A&M.

Reynolds started his coaching career as a graduate assistant and assistant recruiting coordinator at Texas A&M University in 1991. Before entering the NFL, he was also the assistant recruiting coordinator at the University of Tennessee in 1992.

Reynolds spent six years with the Green Bay Packers, where he served as an administrative assistant in football operations from 1993 to 1995, and as offensive assistant of quality control from 1996 to 1998.

Gary Reynolds died on August 20, 2020, of cancer.
