= 2008 Detroit Lions season =

NFL team season, first team in NFL history to go 0-16

- Owner: William Clay Ford Sr.
- General manager: Matt Millen (fired Week 4; 0–3 record); Martin Mayhew (interim; 0–13 record)
- Head coach: Rod Marinelli
- Offensive coordinator: Jim Colletto
- Defensive coordinator: Joe Barry
- Home stadium: Ford Field

Results
- Record: 0–16
- Division place: 4th NFC North
- Playoffs: Did not qualify

Uniform

The 2008 season was the Detroit Lions' 79th in the National Football League (NFL), and their 75th since moving to Detroit from Portsmouth, Ohio. The Lions made history by becoming the first team since the schedule was expanded to 16 games to finish winless. It is one of only four winless seasons since the merger.

2008 was the third season under head coach Rod Marinelli, and the Lions entered the season looking to improve upon their 7–9 record the year before, their best since the 2000 season. However, the Lions instead suffered one of the worst seasons in NFL history, finishing 0–16 and joining the expansion 1976 Tampa Bay Buccaneers as only the second team since the AFL–NFL merger to finish a full-length season winless, and the first under the 16-game schedule in place from 1978 to 2020. The Lions gave up a franchise-record 517 points during the season, coming within 16 of matching the 1981 Colts' record of 533 points allowed. The Lions' 32.31 points per game allowed on defense is the third worst of any NFL team since the 1960s, bettering only the 1966 Giants (35.79 PPG) and the aforementioned 1981 Colts (33.31 PPG). The 517 points-allowed mark has since been eclipsed by the 2020 team, who allowed 519 points.

The Lions were mathematically eliminated from playoff contention with a Week 11 loss to the Carolina Panthers. Embattled team president, general manager, and CEO Matt Millen, who had served in those roles since 2001, was fired on September 24, 2008. Marinelli was fired after the season ended along with most of his staff.

To celebrate their 75th season playing as the Lions, (Note: The franchise now known as the Detroit Lions played their first four seasons from 1930 to 1933 as the Portsmouth Spartans) the team wore a special throwback replica of the uniforms used in 1934, their first season as the Lions, for two home games. The uniforms had blue jerseys with silver lettering, solid silver pants, blue socks, and solid silver helmets (as helmets were leather back then). This replaced their black alternate jersey used in the 2005 to 2007 seasons.

While unique when it happened, (Note: The 1982 Baltimore Colts also went winless at 0–8–1, but that season was shortened by a player's strike between Week 3 and Week 10) the 2008 Lions' 0–16 record was later matched by the 2017 Cleveland Browns. Combined with the Lions' 2–14 record the next year, this was the worst two season record since the merger until it was surpassed by the Browns, who had a 1–15 record in 2016 followed by an 0–16 record in 2017. With the NFL later extending the season to 17 games beginning in 2021, an 0–16 record is now no longer a possibility, although such a start can be achieved, regardless of how the 17th game goes. As a result, the 2008 Lions and 2017 Browns are the only two teams to go winless in a 16-game season.

== Season ==
=== Notable roster losses and trades ===
- DT Shaun Rogers – Traded on February 29 to the Cleveland Browns in exchange for cornerback Leigh Bodden and a third-round pick in the 2008 NFL draft. (The Lions selected Andre Fluellen with this pick.)
- DE Kalimba Edwards – Released on March 13 – signed with the Oakland Raiders
- RB Kevin Jones – Released on March 13 – signed with the Chicago Bears

=== 2008 draft ===
Off-the-field issues marred three of the Lions' 2008 draft picks. First-round draft pick Gosder Cherilus was involved in a bar fight in Boston the previous July, and was sentenced to one year of probation, though he would go on to assume the starting offensive tackle role in Week 3 of the 2008 season, providing some youth to an aging offensive line. Second-round draft pick Jordon Dizon was arrested and charged with drunk-driving six days prior to the NFL Draft. Despite being drafted, military obligations prevented seventh-round pick Caleb Campbell from playing in the NFL until 2010.

However, among the Lions' later draft picks were Cliff Avril and Jerome Felton, both of whom went on to reach the Pro Bowl. Avril, who recorded 23 tackles and five sacks in his rookie season at Detroit, would go on to win Super Bowl XLVIII as a member of the Seattle Seahawks.

2008 Detroit Lions draft
Round	Pick	Player	Position	College	Notes
1	17	Gosder Cherilus	OT	Boston College	
2	45	Jordon Dizon	LB	Colorado	
3	64	Kevin Smith	RB	UCF	
3	87	Andre Fluellen	DT	Florida State	
3	92	Cliff Avril *	DE	Purdue	
5	136	Kenneth Moore	WR	Wake Forest	
5	146	Jerome Felton *	FB	Furman	
7	216	Landon Cohen	DT	Ohio	
7	218	Caleb Campbell	S	Army	
Made roster * Made at least one Pro Bowl during career

== Staff ==
Detroit Lions 2008 staff
Front office: Owner/chairman – William Clay Ford Sr.; Vice chairman – William Clay Ford Jr.; Executive vice president/interim CEO – Tom Lewand; Senior vice president/general manager – Martin Mayhew; Vice president of football operations – Cedric Saunders; Director of college scouting – Scott McEwen; Director of pro personnel – Sheldon White; Assistant director of college scouting – Lance Newmark; Assistant director of pro personnel – Dave Boller and Charlie Sanders; Head coaches: Head coach – Rod Marinelli; Assistant head coach/pass game coordinator – Kippy Brown; Offensive coaches: Offensive coordinator – Jim Colletto; Quarterbacks – Scot Loeffler; Running backs – Sam Gash; Wide receivers – Shawn Jefferson; Tight ends – Pat Carter; Assistant offensive line – Mike Barry; Offensive assistant – Eric Sutulovich	Defensive coaches: Defensive coordinator – Joe Barry; Defensive line – Joe Cullen; Linebackers – Phil Snow; Secondary – Jimmy Lake; Assistant secondary – Clayton Lopez; Defensive quality control – Don Clemons; Special teams coaches: Special teams – Stan Kwan; Assistant special teams – Bradford Banta; Strength and conditioning: Head strength and conditioning – Jason Arapoff; Assistant strength and conditioning – Malcolm Blacken; Assistant strength and conditioning – Kevin Tolbert

== Final roster ==
2008 Detroit Lions roster
Quarterbacks (QB): 11 Daunte Culpepper; 12 Drew Henson; 6 Dan Orlovsky; 5 Drew Stanton; Running backs (RB): 36 Aveion Cason; 45 Jerome Felton FB; 32 Rudi Johnson; 44 Moran Norris FB; 34 Kevin Smith; Wide receivers (WR): 19 Keary Colbert; 10 Chris Hannon; 80 Adam Jennings; 81 Calvin Johnson; 16 John Standeford; 17 Travis Taylor; Tight ends (TE): 82 Casey FitzSimmons; 86 Michael Gaines; 83 John Owens	Offensive linemen (OL): 76 Jeff Backus T; 77 Gosder Cherilus T; 74 Damion Cook G; 71 Junius Coston G; 72 George Foster T; 67 Andy McCollum C; 66 Stephen Peterman G; 51 Dominic Raiola C; 63 Manny Ramirez G; Defensive linemen (DL): 97 Ikaika Alama-Francis DE; 92 Cliff Avril DE; 75 Shaun Cody DT; 98 Landon Cohen DT; 91 Chuck Darby DT; 96 Andre Fluellen DE/DT; 79 Langston Moore DT; 93 Corey Smith DE; 99 Dewayne White DE	Linebackers (LB): 46 Darnell Bing OLB; 52 Anthony Cannon OLB; 53 Paris Lenon MLB; 55 Ryan Nece OLB; 50 Ernie Sims OLB; Defensive backs (DB): 28 Leigh Bodden CB; 27 Daniel Bullocks S; 21 Travis Fisher CB; 35 LaMarcus Hicks FS; 24 Kalvin Pearson FS; 33 Chris Roberson CB; 38 Ramzee Robinson CB; 39 Stuart Schweigert SS; 30 Dexter Wynn CB; Special teams (ST): 4 Jason Hanson K; 2 Nick Harris P; 48 Don Muhlbach LS	Practice squad: 62 Ben Claxton C/G; 25 Dowayne Davis S; 43 Allen Ervin RB; 18 Eric Fowler WR; 54 Chris Graham LB; 94 Rudolph Hardie DE; 85 Jake Nordin TE; 49 Jeff Shoate CB; Reserve: 42 Gerald Alexander S (IR); 13 Reggie Ball WR (IR); 40 Jon Bradley FB (IR); 29 Brian Calhoun RB (IR); 89 Dan Campbell TE (IR); 95 Jared DeVries DE (IR); 57 Jordon Dizon LB (IR); 87 Mike Furrey (IR); 8 Jon Kitna QB (IR); 60 Shemiah LeGrande DT (IR); 59 Alex Lewis LB (IR); 84 Shaun McDonald (IR); 64 Edwin Mulitalo G (IR); 78 Cory Redding DT (IR); 26 Dwight Smith S (IR); 23 Keith Smith CB (IR); 31 Stanley Wilson Jr. CB (IR); Rookies in italics 53 active, 17 reserve, 8 practice squad

== Schedule ==
=== Preseason ===
Week	Date	Opponent	Result	Record	Venue	Recap
1	August 7	New York Giants	W 13–10	1–0	Ford Field	Recap
2	August 17	at Cincinnati Bengals	W 27–10	2–0	Paul Brown Stadium	Recap
3	August 23	Cleveland Browns	W 26–6	3–0	Ford Field	Recap
4	August 28	at Buffalo Bills	W 14–6	4–0	Ralph Wilson Stadium	Recap

=== Regular season ===
In addition to their regular games against NFC North division rivals, the Lions played games against the NFC South and AFC South according to the NFL's schedule rotation established in 2002, and also played against the Washington Redskins, and the San Francisco 49ers, who had like the Lions finished third in their NFC division in 2007.

Week	Date	Opponent	Result	Record	Venue	Recap
1	September 7	at Atlanta Falcons	L 21–34	0–1	Georgia Dome	Recap
2	September 14	Green Bay Packers	L 25–48	0–2	Ford Field	Recap
3	September 21	at San Francisco 49ers	L 13–31	0–3	Candlestick Park	Recap
4	Bye					
5	October 5	Chicago Bears	L 7–34	0–4	Ford Field	Recap
6	October 12	at Minnesota Vikings	L 10–12	0–5	Hubert H. Humphrey Metrodome	Recap
7	October 19	at Houston Texans	L 21–28	0–6	Reliant Stadium	Recap
8	October 26	Washington Redskins	L 17–25	0–7	Ford Field	Recap
9	November 2	at Chicago Bears	L 23–27	0–8	Soldier Field	Recap
10	November 9	Jacksonville Jaguars	L 14–38	0–9	Ford Field	Recap
11	November 16	at Carolina Panthers	L 22–31	0–10	Bank of America Stadium	Recap
12	November 23	Tampa Bay Buccaneers	L 20–38	0–11	Ford Field	Recap
13	November 27	Tennessee Titans	L 10–47	0–12	Ford Field	Recap
14	December 7	Minnesota Vikings	L 16–20	0–13	Ford Field	Recap
15	December 14	at Indianapolis Colts	L 21–31	0–14	Lucas Oil Stadium	Recap
16	December 21	New Orleans Saints	L 7–42	0–15	Ford Field	Recap
17	December 28	at Green Bay Packers	L 21–31	0–16	Lambeau Field	Recap

NFC North
	W	L	T	PCT	DIV	CONF	PF	PA	STK
^{(3)} Minnesota Vikings	10	6	0	.625	4–2	8–4	379	333	W1
Chicago Bears	9	7	0	.563	4–2	7–5	375	350	L1
Green Bay Packers	6	10	0	.375	4–2	5–7	419	380	W1
Detroit Lions	0	16	0	.000	0–6	0–12	268	517	L16

== Game recaps ==
=== Week 1: at Atlanta Falcons ===
Week 1: Detroit Lions at Atlanta Falcons

Quarter	1	2	3	4	Total
Lions	0	14	7	0	21
Falcons	21	0	10	3	34

at Georgia Dome, Atlanta, Georgia

- Game time: 1:00 p.m. EDT
- Game weather: None (indoor stadium)
- Game attendance: 62,310
- Referee: Ron Winter
- TV announcers (Fox): Matt Vasgersian, J. C. Pearson and Nischelle Turner
- Recap, Game Book

Game information

First quarter

- ATL – Michael Jenkins 62-yard pass from Matt Ryan (Jason Elam kick), 13:33. Falcons 7–0. Drive: 3 plays, 74 yards, 1:27.
- ATL – Michael Turner 66-yard run (Jason Elam kick), 7:33. Falcons 14–0. Drive: 4 plays, 80 yards, 2:06.
- ATL – Michael Turner 5-yard run (Jason Elam kick), 3:20. Falcons 21–0. Drive: 6 plays, 38 yards, 3:11.

Second quarter

- DET – Kevin Smith 3-yard run (Jason Hanson kick), 4:06. Falcons 21–7. Drive: 12 plays, 64 yards, 6:56.
- DET – Roy Williams 21-yard pass from Jon Kitna (Jason Hanson kick), 0:16. Falcons 21–14. Drive: 4 plays, 67 yards, 0:39.

Third quarter

- ATL – Jason Elam 50-yard field goal, 9:45. Falcons 24–14. Drive: 5 plays, 17 yards, 2:25.
- ATL – Jerious Norwood 10-yard run (Jason Elam kick), 5:57. Falcons 31–14. Drive: 5 plays, 68 yards, 2:09.
- DET – Casey Fitzsimmons 1-yard pass from Jon Kitna (Jason Hanson kick), 1:40. Falcons 31–21. Drive: 8 plays, 75 yards, 4:17.

Fourth quarter

- ATL – Jason Elam 25-yard field goal, 10:27. Falcons 34–21. Drive: 12 plays, 86 yards, 6:17.

Top passers

- DET – Jon Kitna – 24/33, 262 yards, 2 TD, INT
- ATL – Matt Ryan – 9/13, 161 yards, TD

Top rushers

- DET – Kevin Smith – 16 rushes, 48 yards, TD
- ATL – Michael Turner – 22 rushes, 202 yards, 2 TD

Top receivers

- DET – Calvin Johnson – 7 receptions, 107 yards
- ATL – Michael Jenkins – 1 reception, 62 yards, TD

With Jon Kitna the opening week starter at QB, the Lions began 2008 at the Georgia Dome against the Atlanta Falcons, with then-rookie QB Matt Ryan and Mike Smith in his first year as the Falcons' head coach. A preseason poll on thespread.com said the Falcons were less likely to make the Super Bowl than the Lions. (Note: thespread.com poll said the Falcons were the least likely of all 32 NFL teams to make the Super Bowl, but contradicting preseason expectations, the Falcons would finish 11–5 before losing in the wild card round of the playoffs to the Arizona Cardinals.)

In the first quarter, Detroit trailed early as Ryan completed a 62-yard TD pass to WR Michael Jenkins, while RB Michael Turner scored twice on runs of 66 and 5 yards. The Lions responded in the second quarter when rookie RB Kevin Smith scored on a 3-yard TD run, and QB Kitna completed a 21-yard TD pass to WR Roy Williams. This cut the Falcons' lead to 7 going into halftime.

In the third quarter, Atlanta continued its dominant start with a 50-yard field goal by long-time Bronco star Jason Elam, playing his first game with the Falcons. Falcons RB Jerious Norwood proceeded to score on a 10-yard TD run. Although Detroit replied with a 1-yard TD pass by TE Casey FitzSimmons, the Falcons sealed the win in the fourth quarter with another Elam field goal, this time for 25 yards.

Turner and Norwood ripped through the Detroit defense like machetes ripping through palm leaves. Every time you looked up, they seemed to be pounding the Lions' front and the Lions' middle for 10 yards, 12 yards, 14 yards. When they got tired of running past them, they just ran through them.

— Mitch Albom, Detroit Free Press, September 8, 2008

Kitna finished the game completing 24 out of 33 pass attempts for 242 yards, two touchdowns and one interception (by Lawyer Milloy in the third quarter), getting sacked three times. Calvin Johnson, sharing snaps with Roy Williams in his second NFL season, hauled in seven catches for 107 yards, including a 38-yard completion during the Lions' second scoring drive. The Lions' main issue was their defense, especially their rush defense, which proved powerless against the strong Falcons RB Turner, who, in addition to two touchdowns, rushed for 220 yards on 22 carries. Jerious Norwood proved as dangerous, rushing for 93 yards on 14 carries with one touchdown. Overall, the Lions rush defense allowed 318 yards.

=== Week 2: vs. Green Bay Packers ===
Week 2: Green Bay Packers at Detroit Lions

Quarter	1	2	3	4	Total
Packers	7	14	3	24	48
Lions	0	3	6	16	25

at Ford Field, Detroit, Michigan

- Game time: 1:00 p.m. EDT
- Game weather: None (indoor stadium)
- Game attendance: 60,285
- Referee: Walt Coleman
- TV announcers (Fox): Matt Vasgersian, J. C. Pearson and Charissa Thompson
- Recap, Game Book

Game information

First quarter

- GB – James Jones 9-yard pass from Aaron Rodgers (Mason Crosby kick), 2:06. Packers 7–0. Drive: 15 plays, 86 yards, 8:10.

Second quarter

- GB – Donald Driver 2-yard pass from Aaron Rodgers (Mason Crosby kick), 11:07. Packers 14–0. Drive: 5 plays, 82 yards, 2:55.
- GB – Jordy Nelson 29-yard pass from Aaron Rodgers (Mason Crosby kick), 6:47. Packers 21–0. Drive: 4 plays, 63 yards, 2:14.
- DET – Jason Hanson 38-yard field goal, 0:14. Packers 21–3. Drive: 11 plays, 57 yards, 2:15.

Third quarter

- DET – Jason Hanson 49-yard field goal, 11:27. Packers 21–6. Drive: 10 plays, 43 yards, 3:33.
- DET – Jason Hanson 53-yard field goal, 8:15. Packers 21–9. Drive: 4 plays, −5 yards, 1:22.
- GB – Mason Crosby 25-yard field goal, 2:28. Packers 24–9. Drive: 13 plays, 65 yards, 5:47.

Fourth quarter

- DET – Calvin Johnson 38-yard pass from Jon Kitna (Jason Hanson kick), 13:17. Packers 24–16. Drive: 4 plays, 80 yards, 1:43.
- DET – Derrick Frost fumbles out of bounds in end zone for a safety, 11:41. Packers 24–18.
- DET – Calvin Johnson 47-yard pass from Jon Kitna (Jason Hanson kick), 7:41. Lions 25–24. Drive: 1 play, 57 yards, 0:10.
- GB – Mason Crosby 39-yard field goal, 5:17. Packers 27–25. Drive: 6 plays, 59 yards, 2:24.
- GB – Brandon Jackson 19-yard run (Jason Hanson kick), 3:31. Packers 34–25. Drive: 4 plays, 40 yards, 1:39.
- GB – Charles Woodson 41-yard interception return (Mason Crosby kick), 3:09. Packers 41–25.
- GB – Nick Collins 42-yard interception return (Jason Hanson kick), 2:07. Packers 48–25.

Top passers

- GB – Aaron Rodgers – 24/38, 328 yards, 3 TD
- DET – Jon Kitna – 21/41, 276 yards, 2 TD, 3 INT

Top rushers

- GB – Brandon Jackson – 7 rushes, 61 yards, TD
- DET – Kevin Smith – 10 rushes, 40 yards

Top receivers

- GB – Greg Jennings – 6 receptions, 167 yards
- DET – Calvin Johnson – 6 receptions, 129 yards, 2 TD

Hoping to rebound from their road loss to the Falcons, the Lions played their Week 2 home opener against their NFC North rival, the Green Bay Packers. For the second week in a row, they faced a team with a quarterback who was playing their first game as an official starter, this time being Aaron Rodgers, who took over after Brett Favre was traded to the New York Jets in the off-season.

Detroit started by trailing 21–0 for the second week in a row. Packers QB Rodgers dominated the first half, completing a 9-yard TD pass to WR James Jones in the first quarter, a 2-yard TD pass to WR Donald Driver and a 29-yard TD pass to WR Jordy Nelson in the second quarter. Detroit closed out the first half with kicker Jason Hanson nailing a 38-yard field goal.

Unfortunately when we needed it the most, I didn't get the job done.

— Jon Kitna,

In the third quarter, the Lions started hacking away at Green Bay's lead, as Hanson kicked a field goal for 49 yards. A sack-fumble by Rodgers was recovered by Dewayne White, leading to a 53-yard field goal by Hanson. Mason Crosby added to Green Bay's lead with a 25-yard field goal, and went on to kick another field goal for 39 yards in the fourth quarter. Detroit kept clawing away at the Packers' lead, as QB Jon Kitna completed a 38-yard TD pass to WR Calvin Johnson, Johnson's first touchdown of the season. The Lions earned a safety when a snap to Packers punter Derrick Frost went high, and through the back of his end zone.

The Lions took the lead on another Kitna pass to Calvin Johnson, this time for 47 yards, and seemed poised for a win in their home opener. However, Green Bay rebounded with several key defensive plays to reclaim the game. Kitna threw three consecutive interceptions in the fourth quarter that led to scoring plays. The first led to a 19-yard TD run by Brandon Jackson. The second and third were pick-six plays: CB Charles Woodson returned one 41 yards for a touchdown, and safety Nick Collins returned the other for a 42-yard touchdown.

=== Week 3: at San Francisco 49ers ===
Week 3: Detroit Lions at San Francisco 49ers

Quarter	1	2	3	4	Total
Lions	0	3	3	7	13
49ers	7	14	0	10	31

at Candlestick Park, San Francisco, California

- Game time: 1:05 p.m. PDT / 4:05 p.m. EDT
- Game weather: Sunny, 67 °F (19 °C)
- Game attendance: 67,249
- Referee: Bill Leavy
- TV announcers (Fox): Dick Stockton, Brian Baldinger, Brian Billick and Laura Okmin
- Recap, Game Book

Game information

First quarter

- SF – Isaac Bruce 6-yard pass from J. T. O'Sullivan (Joe Nedney kick), 2:16. 49ers 7–0. Drive: 6 plays, 49 yards, 3:15.

Second quarter

- SF – Frank Gore 4-yard run (Joe Nedney kick), 12:52. 49ers 14–0. Drive: 6 plays, 53 yards, 2:58.
- DET – Jason Hanson 44-yard field goal, 7:23. 49ers 14–3. Drive: 11 plays, 44 yards, 5:29.
- SF – Delanie Walker 24-yard pass from J. T. O'Sullivan (Joe Nedney kick), 5:48. 49ers 21–3. Drive: 3 plays, 72 yards, 1:35.

Third quarter

- DET – Jason Hanson 51-yard field goal, 1:48. 49ers 21–6. Drive: 5 plays, 29 yards, 1:23.

Fourth quarter

- SF – Allen Rossum 1-yard run (Joe Nedney kick), 9:31. 49ers 28–6. Drive: 12 plays, 77 yards, 7:12.
- DET – Rudi Johnson 34-yard pass from Jon Kitna (Jason Hanson kick), 6:57. 49ers 28–13. Drive: 9 plays, 78 yards, 2:34.
- SF – Joe Nedney 25-yard field goal, 4:25. 49ers 31–13. Drive: 4 plays, 5 yards, 2:32.

Top passers

- DET – Jon Kitna – 15/30, 146 yards, TD, INT
- SF – J. T. O'Sullivan – 16/23, 189 yards, 2 TD

Top rushers

- DET – Rudi Johnson – 14 rushes, 83 yards
- SF – Frank Gore – 27 rushes, 130 yards, TD

Top receivers

- DET – Rudi Johnson – 3 receptions, 41 yards, TD
- SF – Delanie Walker – 3 receptions, 44 yards, TD

The Lions visited Candlestick Park in San Francisco for a Week 3 duel with the 49ers. The contest brought the Lions directly against two former members who were part of the team in 2007. Mike Martz had overseen the Lions offense as their coordinator the previous two seasons, but had been fired after a promising start ended with a 7–9 record. J.T. O'Sullivan, the Lions' former third-string quarterback, filled in for both the injured Kitna and Dan Orlovsky for four games in 2007, including an overtime win, but became a free agent in the offseason. Martz took the offensive coordinator job in San Francisco, while O'Sullivan became the 49ers' starting QB.

Detroit began the game trailing their opponent for the third week in a row. In the first quarter, 49ers QB O'Sullivan completed a 6-yard TD pass to WR Isaac Bruce. In the second quarter, San Francisco increased its lead when RB Frank Gore scored on a 4-yard TD run. The Lions got on the board when kicker Jason Hanson hit a 44-yard field goal, but the 49ers closed out the half with an O'Sullivan completion to TE Delanie Walker for a 24-yard touchdown.

In 33 years of losing out here [at Candlestick Park], strange things have happened. This time, next season came in September.

— Rob Parker, Detroit News,

In the third quarter, Detroit scored first on a Jason Hanson 51-yard field goal. In the fourth quarter, San Francisco increased its lead when CB Allen Rossum scored on a 1-yard TD run. Although QB Jon Kitna completed a 34-yard TD pass to RB Rudi Johnson, this was as far as the Lions offense threatened the 49ers' dominance.

A combination of small detriments cost the Lions the game. The Lions were penalized 9 times for 61 yards, only converted 14 first downs to the 49ers' 25, reached the 49ers' red zone only once (leading to the Rudi Johnson touchdown), and turned the ball over twice, the second a Dan Orlovsky pass intercepted by Justin Smith with 2:41 left in the game.

Orlovsky came into the game in relief of Kitna in the fourth quarter. Kitna, who was sacked three times in the game, sprained his right knee.

=== Week 4: Bye week – Millen fired ===
Matt Millen took the helm as Lions President and CEO in 2001, despite having no management experience. Prior to his tenure, Matt Millen played a 12-year career as a linebacker for the Raiders, 49ers and Redskins, winning Super Bowls with all three teams. After retirement, he worked as a color commentator and studio analyst for CBS, Fox and NBC, as well as Westwood One radio, before his hiring by Lions ownership.

Calls for Millen's firing originated as early as 2005, when Millen received a contract extension despite four dismal seasons and the firing of head coach Steve Mariucci. The "Fire Millen" movement ranged from "Fire Millen" chants at other Detroit-area sporting events, such as Pistons games and WWE events, to angry Lions fan protests. Of lesser help was the fact that Millen was the second highest-paid general manager in the NFL. Going into the bye week in 2008, the team accumulated a league-worst record of 31 wins and 84 losses.

On September 24, 2008, after the Week 3 loss to the 49ers, Millen was fired. Martin Mayhew, Millen's assistant, took over as interim general manager. He would be retained as GM after the season ended, and served in the role until 2015.

=== Week 5: vs. Chicago Bears ===
Week 5: Chicago Bears at Detroit Lions

Quarter	1	2	3	4	Total
Bears	3	14	14	3	34
Lions	0	0	7	0	7

at Ford Field, Detroit, Michigan

- Game time: 1:00 p.m. EDT / 12:00 p.m. CDT
- Game weather: None (indoor stadium)
- Game attendance: 59,790
- Referee: Scott Green
- TV announcers (Fox): Matt Vasgersian, Brian Baldinger, Brian Billick and Laura Okmin
- Recap, Game Book

Game information

First quarter

- CHI – Robbie Gould 37-yard field goal, 6:48. Bears 3–0. Drive: 11 plays, 34 yards, 6:37.

Second quarter

- CHI – Matt Forte 9-yard pass from Kyle Orton (Robbie Gould kick), 5:27. Bears 10–0. Drive: 7 plays, 25 yards, 3:56.
- CHI – Devin Hester 12-yard pass from Kyle Orton (Robbie Gould kick), 1:56. Bears 17–0. Drive: 4 plays, 80 yards, 1:58.

Third quarter

- CHI – Matt Forte 1-yard run (Robbie Gould kick), 11:17. Bears 24–0. Drive: 9 plays, 65 yards, 3:43.
- CHI – Charles Tillman 26-yard interception return (Robbie Gould kick), 10:10. Bears 31–0.'
- DET – Kevin Smith 12-yard run (Jason Hanson kick), 7:08. Bears 31–7. Drive: 7 plays, 30 yards, 1:23.

Fourth quarter

- CHI – Robbie Gould 45-yard field goal, 11:58. Bears 34–7. Drive: 7 plays, 42 yards, 3:32.

Top passers

- CHI – Kyle Orton – 24/34, 334 yards, 2 TD
- DET – Dan Orlovsky – 13/23, 97 yards, INT

Top rushers

- CHI – Matt Forte – 15 rushes, 36 yards, TD
- DET – Kevin Smith – 8 rushes, 31 yards, TD

Top receivers

- CHI – Rashied Davis – 6 receptions, 97 yards
- DET – Roy Williams – 7 receptions, 96 yards

Coming off their bye week, the Lions played a Week 5 Black and Blue Division duel at home with the Chicago Bears. The first game after the firing of Matt Millen, fans who had previously called for Millen's firing either booed the team or left early.

The Bears put on an offensive clinic. After a field goal by Robbie Gould, a 9-yard touchdown pass from Kyle Orton to Matt Forte, and a 12-yard TD pass to Devin Hester, the Lions trailed 17–0 going into halftime. The onslaught continued in the second half, as Forté scored a rushing TD, and CB Charles Tillman intercepted a Dan Orlovsky pass and ran it for a touchdown. Detroit's only score of the game came in the third quarter, when rookie Kevin Smith scored on a 12-yard rushing TD. Another field goal by Gould added to the Bears' lead, a formality at that point. Rod Marinelli successfully challenged a fumble by Jerome Felton in the third quarter, review showing that Felton was down by contact before the fumble. However, Orlovsky was intercepted by Charles Tillman on the very next play.

Jon Kitna started the game for the Lions, but after a poor showing in the first half, Dan Orlovsky came into the game at QB. Both Lions quarterbacks ended up with injuries, Kitna with back spasms and Orlovsky with his ankle. The Lions only managed 185 total yards to the Bears' 425, and gave up 82 points in two home games, the greatest number of points given up in its first two home games since 1958.

=== Week 6: at Minnesota Vikings ===
Week 6: Detroit Lions at Minnesota Vikings

Quarter	1	2	3	4	Total
Lions	0	3	7	0	10
Vikings	2	0	7	3	12

at Hubert H. Humphrey Metrodome, Minneapolis, Minnesota

- Game time: 1:00 p.m. EDT / 12:00 p.m. CDT
- Game weather: None (indoor stadium)
- Game attendance: 62,867
- Referee: Tony Corrente
- TV announcers (Fox): Ron Pitts, Tony Boselli and Charissa Thompson
- Recap, Game Book

Game information

First quarter

- MIN – Dan Orlovsky sacked out of bounds in end zone by Jared Allen for a safety, 0:18. Vikings 2–0.

Second quarter

- DET – Jason Hanson 40-yard field goal, 1:56. Lions 3–2. Drive: 6 plays, 48 yards, 3:02.

Third quarter

- DET – Calvin Johnson 12-yard pass from Dan Orlovsky (Jason Hanson kick), 8:22. Lions 10–2. Drive: 10 plays, 69 yards, 6:38.
- MIN – Bernard Berrian 86-yard pass from Gus Frerotte (Ryan Longwell kick), 4:33. Lions 10–9. Drive: 1 play, 86 yards, 0:14.

Fourth quarter

- MIN – Ryan Longwell 26-yard field goal, 0:09. Vikings 12–10. Drive: 10 plays, 63 yards, 4:32.

Top passers

- DET – Dan Orlovsky – 12/21, 150 yards, TD
- MIN – Gus Frerotte – 18/33, 296 yards, TD, INT

Top rushers

- DET – Kevin Smith – 5 rushes, 62 yards
- MIN – Adrian Peterson – 25 rushes, 111 yards

Top receivers

- DET – Calvin Johnson – 4 receptions, 85 yards, TD
- MIN – Bernard Berrian – 5 receptions, 131 yards, TD

Third and ten. Here comes Jared Allen, and he's out of bounds. Poor guy, I don't even know if he realized it, and that's a safety.

— Ron Pitts, calling Dan Orlovsky's safety for NFL on Fox

The Lions traveled to Minneapolis in Week 6 to take on the Minnesota Vikings. Although the Vikings under Brad Childress would finish the season as NFC North champions, they struggled early in the season. After an 0–2 start, Childress benched his opening day starting QB Tarvaris Jackson in favor of veteran Gus Frerotte. The Lions, for their part, went to Dan Orlovsky for the start, as Kitna still had a back injury.

The first score of the game came with 21 seconds left in the first quarter, and cemented itself into Lions lore. The Lions benefited from a fumble by Adrian Peterson that was recovered by Dwight Smith, but the Lions began the drive on their own 1-yard line. After two incomplete passes and a timeout, on third down, Vikings defensive end Jared Allen broke through the Lions' offensive line and went after Orlovsky, who unintentionally ran out of the back of his endzone, giving the Vikings a safety. Despite the safety, the Lions took the lead in the second quarter, as Jason Hanson kicked a 40-yard field goal.

In the third quarter, Detroit increased its lead as Orlovsky completed a 12-yard TD pass to WR Calvin Johnson. Minnesota answered when QB Gus Frerotte completed an 86-yard TD pass to WR Bernard Berrian. However, another turnover by Adrian Peterson and an interception of a Frerotte pass by Leigh Bodden kept the game close going into the fourth quarter.

Although both teams' offensive struggles continued, a pair of controversial calls swung the game towards the Vikings' favor. Calvin Johnson, after catching an Orlovsky pass, but fumbled the ball after Darren Sharper and Ben Leber tackled him, and Leber recovered. Marinelli challenged the ruling, trying to argue that Johnson was down before the ball came loose, but upon review the play stood as called. The Lions held a glimmer of hope as the ensuing Vikings drive ended when Jared DeVries blocked a Ryan Longwell field goal. However, towards the end of the game, in a pivotal Vikings drive, after a Frerotte pass to Aundrae Allison went incomplete, Lions cornerback Leigh Bodden was called for pass interference, though his contact with Allison appeared to be minimal. The penalty placed the ball on the Lions' 26-yard line, and with time expiring, Longwell kicked a game-winning go-ahead 26-yard field goal.

=== Roster moves ===
On October 14, the Lions traded wide receiver Roy Williams to the Dallas Cowboys for first-, third- and sixth-round picks in the 2009 NFL draft. The Lions had drafted Williams in the first round in the 2004 NFL draft, his best season coming in 2006 when he made the Pro Bowl. The trade helped build the Lions' future draft potential, while the Cowboys paired Williams with Terrell Owens in preparation for a potential 2008 playoff run.

The same day, despite possible rumors he would be traded prior to the deadline, quarterback Jon Kitna was placed on injured reserve for the remainder of the season, due to chronic back pain stemming from a bulging disk causing a pinched nerve. Kitna expressed his displeasure with the move in an interview, saying the Lions used it as an excuse to make Orlovsky the starter. The Lions eventually traded Kitna to the Cowboys on February 28, 2009, for cornerback Anthony Henry.

=== Week 7: at Houston Texans ===
Week 7: Detroit Lions at Houston Texans

Quarter	1	2	3	4	Total
Lions	0	3	7	11	21
Texans	14	7	7	0	28

at Reliant Stadium, Houston, Texas

- Game time: 4:05 p.m. EDT / 3:05 p.m. CDT
- Game weather: Clear, 77 °F (25 °C)
- Game attendance: 70,081
- Referee: Bill Carollo
- TV announcers (Fox): Chris Rose, J. C. Pearson and Nischelle Turner
- Recap, Game Book

Game information

First quarter

- HOU – Owen Daniels 2-yard pass from Matt Schaub (Kris Brown kick), 10:50. Texans 7–0. Drive: 7 plays, 75 yards, 4:10.
- HOU – Ahman Green 1-yard run (Kris Brown kick), 5:44. Texans 14–0. Drive: 8 plays, 72 yards, 3:25.

Second quarter

- HOU – Steve Slaton 1-yard run (Kris Brown kick), 12:13. Texans 21–0. Drive: 10 plays, 74 yards, 5:10.
- DET – Jason Hanson 54-yard field goal, 6:28. Texans 21–3. Drive: 11 plays, 37 yards, 5:45.

Third quarter

- DET – Kevin Smith 26-yard run (Jason Hanson kick), 11:53. Texans 21–10. Drive: 3 plays, 47 yards, 0:39.
- HOU – Owen Daniels 1-yard pass from Matt Schaub (Kris Brown kick), 1:45. Texans 28–10. Drive: 15 plays, 79 yards, 10:08.

Fourth quarter

- DET – Calvin Johnson 96-yard pass from Dan Orlovsky (Dan Orlovsky–Calvin Johnson pass), 11:45. Texans 28–18. Drive: 1 play, 96 yards, 0:11.
- DET – Jason Hanson 54-yard field goal, 4:17. Texans 28–21. Drive: 11 plays, 61 yards, 4:50.

Top passers

- DET – Dan Orlovsky – 12/25, 265 yards, TD
- HOU – Matt Schaub – 26/31, 267 yards, 2 TD

Top rushers

- DET – Kevin Smith – 10 rushes, 61 yards, TD
- HOU – Steve Slaton – 17 rushes, 80 yards, TD

Top receivers

- DET – Calvin Johnson – 2 receptions, 154 yards, TD
- HOU – Andre Johnson – 11 receptions, 141 yards

In week 7, the Lions flew down to Houston, Texas for an interconference duel with the Houston Texans. In the first quarter, Detroit's slow start continued as Texans QB Matt Schaub completed a 2-yard TD pass to TE Owen Daniels, along with RB Ahman Green getting a 1-yard TD run. In the second quarter, Houston increased their lead as RB Steve Slaton got a 1-yard TD run. The Lions responded when kicker Jason Hanson completed a 54-yard field goal.

In the third quarter, Detroit began to catch up as rookie RB Kevin Smith got a 26-yard TD run, yet the Texans answered with Schaub completing a 1-yard TD pass to Daniels. In the fourth quarter, the Lions tried to come back as QB Dan Orlovsky completed a 96-yard TD pass to WR Calvin Johnson, along with Hanson nailing a 54-yard field goal. However, Houston's defense prevented any comeback from happening.

=== Week 8: vs. Washington Redskins ===
Week 8: Washington Redskins at Detroit Lions

Quarter	1	2	3	4	Total
Redskins	3	3	10	9	25
Lions	7	3	0	7	17

at Ford Field, Detroit, Michigan

- Game time: 1:00 p.m. EDT
- Game weather: None (indoor stadium)
- Game attendance: 54,312
- Referee: John Parry
- TV announcers (Fox): Thom Brennaman, Brian Billick and Charissa Thompson (blacked out locally)
- Recap, Game Book

Game information

First quarter

- WSH – Shaun Suisham 25-yard field goal, 8:12. Redskins 3–0. Drive: 11 plays, 73 yards, 6:48.
- DET – Rudi Johnson 11-yard run (Jason Hanson kick), 0:13. Lions 7–3. Drive: 4 plays, 49 yards, 1:29.

Second quarter

- DET – Jason Hanson 43-yard field goal, 10:28. Lions 10–3. Drive: 8 plays, 43 yards, 2:49.
- WSH – Shaun Suisham 47-yard field goal, 0:00. Lions 10–6. Drive: 8 plays, 53 yards, 2:22.

Third quarter

- WSH – Shaun Suisham 45-yard field goal, 11:02. Lions 10–9. Drive: 6 plays, 35 yards, 2:42.
- WSH – Santana Moss 50-yard pass from Jason Campbell (Shaun Suisham kick), 4:42. Redskins 16–10. Drive: 7 plays, 95 yards, 4:03.

Fourth quarter

- WSH – Santana Moss 80-yard punt return (pass failed), 11:29. Redskins 22–10.
- DET – Calvin Johnson 17-yard pass from Dan Orlovsky (Jason Hanson kick), 6:39. Redskins 22–17. Drive: 10 plays, 38 yards, 4:50.
- WSH – Shaun Suisham 42-yard field goal, 1:56. Redskins 25–17. Drive: 10 plays, 67 yards, 4:43.

Top passers

- WSH – Jason Campbell – 23/28, 328 yards, TD
- DET – Dan Orlovsky – 21/35, 223 yards, TD

Top rushers

- WSH – Clinton Portis – 24 rushes, 126 yards
- DET – Rudi Johnson – 8 rushes, 21 yards, TD

Top receivers

- WSH – Santana Moss – 9 receptions, 140 yards, TD
- DET – Shaun McDonald – 5 receptions, 68 yards

The Lions went home for a Week 8 duel with the Washington Redskins. This was the first ever regular season game at Ford Field that had failed to sell out by the 72-hour deadline and was, therefore, subject to local television blackout.

In the first quarter, Detroit trailed early as Redskins kicker Shaun Suisham got a 25-yard field goal. In what would be the first time in the season the Lions scored during the first quarter, RB Rudi Johnson got an 11-yard TD run. In the second quarter, Detroit increased its lead as kicker Jason Hanson got a 43-yard field goal. Washington closed out the half with Suisham getting a 47-yard field goal.

In the third quarter, the Redskins regained the lead as Suisham made a 45-yard field goal, along with QB Jason Campbell completing a 50-yard TD pass to WR Santana Moss. In the fourth quarter, the Lions' struggles continued as Moss returned a punt 80 yards for a touchdown. Detroit tried to rally as QB Dan Orlovsky completed a 17-yard TD pass to WR Calvin Johnson. However, Washington closed out the game with Suisham nailing a 42-yard field goal.

=== Signing of Daunte Culpepper ===
On October 28, the Lions discussed a contract with veteran quarterback Daunte Culpepper. He signed with the Lions on November 3 and played 4 games before suffering a shoulder injury.

=== Week 9: at Chicago Bears ===
Week 9: Detroit Lions at Chicago Bears

Quarter	1	2	3	4	Total
Lions	0	23	0	0	23
Bears	10	3	7	7	27

at Soldier Field, Chicago, Illinois

- Game time: 1:00 p.m. EDT / 12:00 p.m. CDT
- Game weather: Mostly cloudy, 60 °F (16 °C)
- Game attendance: 62,188
- Referee: Pete Morelli
- TV announcers (Fox): Sam Rosen, Tim Ryan and Chris Myers
- Recap, Game Book

Game information

First quarter

- CHI – Robbie Gould 36-yard field goal, 11:19. Bears 3–0. Drive: 6 plays, 34 yards, 2:21.
- CHI – Kyle Orton 5-yard run (Robbie Gould kick), 4:32. Bears 10–0. Drive: 10 plays, 58 yards, 4:46.

Second quarter

- DET – Kevin Smith 1-yard run (kick blocked), 13:21. Bears 10–6. Drive: 13 plays, 70 yards, 6:11.
- DET – Calvin Johnson 17-yard pass from Dan Orlovsky (Jason Hanson kick), 13:08. Lions 13–10. Drive: 1 play, 17 yards, 0:06.
- DET – Shaun McDonald 14-yard pass from Dan Orlovsky (Jason Hanson kick), 6:48. Lions 20–10. Drive: 8 plays, 55 yards, 4:02.
- CHI – Robbie Gould 41-yard field goal, 4:41. Lions 20–13. Drive: 6 plays, 37 yards, 2:07.
- DET – Jason Hanson 52-yard field goal, 1:05. Lions 23–13. Drive: 9 plays, 36 yards, 3:36.

Third quarter

- CHI – Rashied Davis 6-yard pass from Rex Grossman (Robbie Gould kick), 7:00. Lions 23–20. Drive: 5 plays, 49 yards, 1:37.

Fourth quarter

- CHI – Rex Grossman 1-yard run (Robbie Gould kick), 5:36. Bears 27–23. Drive: 7 plays, 54 yards, 3:01.

Top passers

- DET – Dan Orlovsky – 28/47, 292 yards, 2 TD, 2 INT
- CHI – Kyle Orton – 8/14, 108 yards

Top rushers

- DET – Kevin Smith – 14 rushes, 37 yards, TD
- CHI – Matt Forte – 22 rushes, 106 yards

Top receivers

- DET – Calvin Johnson – 8 receptions, 94 yards, TD
- CHI – Rashied Davis – 5 receptions, 64 yards, TD

Still trying to get their first win of the season, the Lions traveled to Soldier Field for a Week 9 NFC North rematch with the Chicago Bears. In the first quarter, Detroit trailed early as Bears kicker Robbie Gould got a 36-yard field goal, along with QB Kyle Orton getting a 5-yard TD run. In the second quarter, the Lions greatly responded with rookie RB Kevin Smith getting a 1-yard TD run (with a blocked PAT), along with QB Dan Orlovsky completing a 17-yard TD pass to WR Calvin Johnson and a 14-yard TD pass to WR Shaun McDonald. Chicago would respond with Gould getting a 41-yard field goal, yet Detroit answered with kicker Jason Hanson getting a 52-yard field goal.

In the third quarter, the Bears began to rally as QB Rex Grossman (who took over for Orton after he left the game in the second quarter with a right foot sprain) completed a 6-yard TD pass to WR Rashied Davis. In the fourth quarter, Chicago completed their rally as Grossman got a 1-yard TD run. The Lions tried to rally, but the Bears' defense prevented any possible comeback from happening.

With their ninth consecutive road loss, not only did the Lions fall to 0–8, but following the Bengals' victory over the Jaguars, became the only winless NFL team.

=== Week 10: vs. Jacksonville Jaguars ===
Week 10: Jacksonville Jaguars at Detroit Lions

Quarter	1	2	3	4	Total
Jaguars	3	21	7	7	38
Lions	7	0	0	7	14

at Ford Field, Detroit, Michigan

- Game time: 1:00 p.m. EDT
- Game weather: None (indoor stadium)
- Game attendance: 52,631
- Referee: Carl Cheffers
- TV announcers (CBS): Kevin Harlan and Rich Gannon (blacked out locally)
- Recap, Game Book

Game information

First quarter

- JAX – Josh Scobee 34-yard field goal, 12:37. Jaguars 3–0. Drive: 4 plays, 7 yards, 1:24.
- DET – John Owens 1-yard pass from Drew Stanton (Jason Hanson kick), 3:33. Lions 7–3. Drive: 9 plays, 82 yards, 5:07.

Second quarter

- JAX – Maurice Jones-Drew 6-yard run (Josh Scobee kick), 14:15. Jaguars 10–7. Drive: 8 plays, 80 yards, 4:18.
- JAX – Maurice Jones-Drew 1-yard run (Josh Scobee kick), 8:03. Jaguars 17–7. Drive: 9 plays, 77 yards, 4:27.
- JAX – Maurice Jones-Drew 8-yard run (Josh Scobee kick), 0:39. Jaguars 24–7. Drive: 7 plays, 58 yards, 1:39.

Third quarter

- JAX – Jerry Porter 7-yard pass from David Garrard (Josh Scobee kick), 5:40. Jaguars 31–7. Drive: 15 plays, 83 yards, 9:20.

Fourth quarter

- JAX – Troy Williamson 10-yard pass from David Garrard (Josh Scobee kick), 14:56. Jaguars 38–7. Drive: 8 plays, 55 yards, 4:18.
- DET – Kevin Smith 1-yard run (Jason Hanson kick), 6:02. Jaguars 38–14. Drive: 11 plays, 89 yards, 5:54.

Top passers

- JAX – David Garrard – 18/25, 238 yards, 2 TD
- DET – Daunte Culpepper – 5/10, 104 yards, INT

Top rushers

- JAX – Fred Taylor – 18 rushes, 80 yards
- DET – Kevin Smith – 23 rushes, 96 yards, TD

Top receivers

- JAX – Marcedes Lewis – 4 receptions, 64 yards
- DET – Calvin Johnson – 2 receptions, 92 yards

In week 10 the Lions went home, donned their throwback uniforms, and played an interconference game against the Jacksonville Jaguars. In the first quarter, Detroit trailed early as Jaguars kicker Josh Scobee got a 34-yard field goal. The Lions would respond as QB Drew Stanton made his NFL debut and completed a 1-yard TD pass to TE John Owens on his first NFL pass. In the second quarter, Jacksonville took a huge lead as RB Maurice Jones-Drew got a 6-yard, a 1-yard, and an 8-yard TD run.

In the third quarter, Detroit's misery continued as Jaguars QB David Garrard completed a 7-yard TD pass to WR Jerry Porter. In the fourth quarter, Jacksonville pulled away as Garrard completed a 10-yard TD pass to WR Troy Williamson. The Lions would end the game when rookie RB Kevin Smith scored on a 1-yard TD run.

=== Week 11: at Carolina Panthers ===
Week 11: Detroit Lions at Carolina Panthers

Quarter	1	2	3	4	Total
Lions	7	9	0	6	22
Panthers	0	21	3	7	31

at Bank of America Stadium, Charlotte, North Carolina

- Game time: 1:00 p.m. EDT
- Game weather: Sunny, 54 °F (12 °C)
- Game attendance: 73,349
- Referee: Bill Leavy
- TV announcers (Fox): Ron Pitts, Tony Boselli and Charissa Thompson
- Recap, Game Book

Game information

First quarter

- DET – Calvin Johnson 29-yard pass from Daunte Culpepper (Jason Hanson kick), 7:23. Lions 7–0. Drive: 12 plays, 81 yards, 7:37.

Second quarter

- DET – Jason Hanson 40-yard field goal, 12:59. Lions 10–0. Drive: 13 plays, 64 yards, 6:46.
- CAR – Jeff King 15-yard pass from Jake Delhomme (John Kasay kick), 8:19. Lions 10–7. Drive: 8 plays, 76 yards, 4:40.
- DET – Jason Hanson 56-yard field goal, 4:43. Lions 13–7. Drive: 7 plays, 34 yards, 3:36.
- CAR – DeAngelo Williams 56-yard run (John Kasay kick), 2:39. Panthers 14–13. Drive: 4 plays, 80 yards, 2:04.
- CAR – Jonathan Stewart 22-yard run (John Kasay kick), 1:03. Panthers 21–13. Drive: 5 plays, 42 yards, 1:21.
- DET – Jason Hanson 27-yard field goal, 0:04. Panthers 21–16. Drive: 7 plays, 38 yards, 0:59.

Third quarter

- CAR – John Kasay 29-yard field goal, 8:24. Panthers 24–16. Drive: 10 plays, 70 yards, 6:36.

Fourth quarter

- DET – Daunte Culpepper 1-yard run (run failed), 6:05. Panthers 24–22. Drive: 15 plays, 69 yards, 8:02.
- CAR – DeAngelo Williams 4-yard run (John Kasay kick), 4:44. Panthers 31–22. Drive: 1 play, 4 yards, 0:06.

Top passers

- DET – Daunte Culpepper – 20/35, 207 yards, TD, 2 INT
- CAR – Jake Delhomme – 10/19, 102 yards, TD

Top rushers

- DET – Kevin Smith – 24 rushes, 112 yards
- CAR – Jonathan Stewart – 15 rushes, 130 yards, TD

Top receivers

- DET – Calvin Johnson – 6 receptions, 65 yards, TD
- CAR – Steve Smith Sr. – 6 receptions, 63 yards

The still winless Lions next went to Bank of America Stadium in Charlotte, North Carolina for a Week 11 duel with the Carolina Panthers. In the first quarter, Detroit struck first as QB Daunte Culpepper completed a 29-yard TD pass to WR Calvin Johnson. In the second quarter, the Lions increased their lead when kicker Jason Hanson got a 40-yard field goal. The Panthers responded when QB Jake Delhomme completed a 15-yard TD pass to TE Jeff King. Detroit answered when Hanson completed a 56-yard field goal, yet Carolina took the lead as RB DeAngelo Williams scored a long 56-yard TD run. Later, Carolina RB Jonathan Stewart scored on a 22-yard TD run. The Lions closed out the half as Hanson completed a 27-yard field goal.

In the third quarter, the Panthers increased their lead when kicker John Kasay nailed a 29-yard field goal. In the fourth quarter, Detroit tried to come back as Culpepper got a 1-yard TD run (with a failed 2-point conversion due to a missed facemask call against Carolina), but Carolina pulled away as Williams scored on a 4-yard TD run. Losing this game eliminated the Lions from playoff contention.

=== Week 12: vs Tampa Bay Buccaneers ===
Week 12: Tampa Bay Buccaneers at Detroit Lions

Quarter	1	2	3	4	Total
Buccaneers	0	21	14	3	38
Lions	17	0	3	0	20

at Ford Field, Detroit, Michigan

- Game time: 1:00 p.m. EDT
- Game weather: None (indoor stadium)
- Game attendance: 49,096
- Referee: Bill Carollo
- TV announcers (Fox): Ron Pitts, Tony Boselli, & Charissa Thompson (blacked out locally)
- Recap, Game Book

Game information

First quarter

- DET – Calvin Johnson – 15-yard pass from Daunte Culpepper (Jason Hanson kick), 6:07. Lions 7–0. Drive: 7 plays, 71 yards, 3:23.
- DET – Daniel Bullocks 44-yard fumble return (Jason Hanson kick), 4:40. Lions 14–0.
- DET – Jason Hanson 38-yard field goal, 0:11. Lions 17–0. Drive: 6 plays, 36 yards, 3:00.

Second quarter

- TB – Warrick Dunn 13-yard run (Matt Bryant kick), 11:19. Lions 17–7. Drive: 7 plays, 50 yards, 3:52.
- TB – Ike Hilliard 36-yard pass from Jeff Garcia (Matt Bryant kick), 4:40. Lions 17–14. Drive: 9 plays, 69 yards, 4:51.
- TB – Jerramy Stevens 24-yard pass from Jeff Garcia (Matt Bryant kick), 3:00. Buccaneers 21–17. Drive: 1 play, 24 yards, 0:05.

Third quarter

- TB – Clifton Smith 70-yard punt return (Matt Bryant kick), 11:31. Buccaneers 28–17.
- TB – Ronde Barber 65-yard interception return (Matt Bryant kick), 9:01. Buccaneers 35–17.
- DET – Jason Hanson 40-yard field goal, 2:43. Buccaneers 35–20. Drive: 13 plays, 24 yards, 0:52.

Fourth quarter

- TB – Matt Bryant 48-yard field goal, 12:48. Buccaneers 38–20. Drive: 9 plays, 37 yards, 4:55.

Top passers

- TB – Jeff Garcia – 13/18, 165 yards, 2 TD
- DET – Daunte Culpepper – 8/20, 121 yards, TD, 2 INT

Top rushers

- TB – Warrick Dunn – 14 rushes, 90 yards, TD
- DET – Kevin Smith – 16 rushes, 86 yards

Top receivers

- TB – Ike Hilliard – 2 receptions, 51 yards, TD
- DET – Calvin Johnson – 3 receptions, 66 yards, TD

The Lions went home for a Week 12 duel with another NFC South team, the Tampa Bay Buccaneers. In the first quarter, Detroit struck first as QB Daunte Culpepper completed a 15-yard TD pass to WR Calvin Johnson. The Lions continued their early success as safety Daniel Bullocks returned a fumble 44 yards for a touchdown, while kicker Jason Hanson kicked a 38-yard field goal.

Although the 17–0 early advantage was the largest lead the Lions would obtain all year, it didn't even last until halftime. In the second quarter, the Buccaneers' RB Warrick Dunn got a 13-yard TD run, while QB Jeff Garcia completed a 36-yard TD pass to WR Ike Hilliard and a 24-yard TD pass to TE Jerramy Stevens.

In the third quarter, Tampa Bay added onto their lead as RB Clifton Smith returned a punt 70 yards for a touchdown, along with CB Ronde Barber returning an interception 65 yards for a touchdown. Detroit scored when Hanson got a 40-yard field goal. In the fourth quarter, only the Buccaneers scored when kicker Matt Bryant nailed a 48-yard field goal.

=== Week 13: vs. Tennessee Titans (Thanksgiving Day game) ===
Week 13: Tennessee Titans at Detroit Lions

Quarter	1	2	3	4	Total
Titans	21	14	6	6	47
Lions	3	7	0	0	10

at Ford Field, Detroit, Michigan

- Game time: 12:30 p.m. EDT
- Game weather: None (indoor stadium)
- Game attendance: 60,112
- Referee: Jeff Triplette
- TV announcers (CBS): Jim Nantz and Phil Simms
- Recap, Game Book

Game information

First quarter

- TEN – Chris Johnson 6-yard run (Rob Bironas kick), 13:30. Titans 7–0. Drive: 2 plays, 34 yards, 0:32.
- DET – Jason Hanson 53-yard field goal, 10:30. Titans 7–3. Drive: 8 plays, 45 yards, 3:00.
- TEN – Chris Johnson 58-yard run (Rob Bironas kick), 8:21. Titans 14–3. Drive: 4 plays, 77 yards, 2:09.
- TEN – Dave Ball 15-yard interception return (Rob Bironas kick), 2:22. Titans 21–3.

Second quarter

- TEN – LenDale White 6-yard run (Rob Bironas kick), 14:20. Titans 28–3. Drive: 4 plays, 31 yards, 1:24.
- TEN – LenDale White 2-yard run (Rob Bironas kick), 2:48. Titans 35–3. Drive: 15 plays, 92 yards, 8:25.
- DET – Michael Gaines 2-yard pass from Daunte Culpepper (Jason Hanson kick), 0:34. Titans 35–10. Drive: 2 plays, 2 yards, 0:17.

Third quarter

- TEN – Rob Bironas 49-yard field goal, 12:04. Titans 38–10. Drive: 5 plays, 29 yards, 2:56.
- TEN – Rob Bironas 41-yard field goal, 2:24. Titans 41–10. Drive: 9 plays, 39 yards, 4:14.

Fourth quarter

- TEN – Rob Bironas 45-yard field goal, 10:23. Titans 44–10. Drive: 8 plays, 11 yards, 2:22.
- TEN – Rob Bironas 43-yard field goal, 4:29. Titans 47–10. Drive: 7 plays, 61 yards, 4:27.

Top passers

- TEN – Kerry Collins – 11/18, 127 yards
- DET – Daunte Culpepper – 13/26, 134 yards, TD, INT

Top rushers

- TEN – Chris Johnson – 16 rushes, 125 yards, 2 TD
- DET – Kevin Smith – 12 rushes, 22 yards

Top receivers

- TEN – Ahmard Hall – 2 receptions, 53 yards
- DET – Calvin Johnson – 5 receptions, 66 yards

Later that week, the Lions stayed at home, donned their throwback uniforms again, and played their 69th annual Thanksgiving Day game against the Tennessee Titans. It was one of the Lions' 16th nationally televised game of the regular season and the only one amongst the final six home games that wasn't blacked out, although the Lions needed a 24-hour extension to sell out Ford Field. In the first quarter, Detroit trailed early as Titans RB Chris Johnson ran for a 6-yard TD. The Lions responded with Jason Hanson kicking a 53-yard field goal. Tennessee answered with Johnson running 58-yards for a score, along with DE Dave Ball returning an interception 15 yards for a TD. In the second quarter, Detroit's misery continued as RB LenDale White scored on runs of 6 yards and 2 yards. Detroit ended the half with QB Daunte Culpepper completing a 2-yard TD pass to TE Michael Gaines. In the third quarter, the Titans pulled away as kicker Rob Bironas kicked field goals of 49 and 41 yards. In the fourth quarter, Tennessee scored two more times when Bironas nailed 45 and 43-yard field goals.

Singer Jesse McCartney performed during halftime.

As Detroit fell to 0–12, the 47 points were the most points that the Lions had ever given up on Thanksgiving Day. This also made 2008 the second successive NFL season to see a team start 0–12 after the Miami Dolphins in 2007.

=== Week 14: vs. Minnesota Vikings ===
Week 14: Minnesota Vikings at Detroit Lions

Quarter	1	2	3	4	Total
Vikings	0	3	7	10	20
Lions	3	3	7	3	16

at Ford Field, Detroit, Michigan

- Game time: 1:00 p.m. EDT / 12:00 p.m. CDT
- Game weather: None (indoor stadium)
- Game attendance: 50,444
- Referee: Jerome Boger
- TV announcers (Fox): Sam Rosen, Tim Ryan and Chris Myers (blacked out locally)
- Recap, Game Book

Game information

First quarter

- DET – Jason Hanson 25-yard field goal, 1:01. Lions 3–0. Drive: 13 plays, 72 yards, 7:52.

Second quarter

- DET – Jason Hanson 23-yard field goal, 11:39. Lions 6–0. Drive: 8 plays, 47 yards, 3:37.
- MIN – Ryan Longwell 35-yard field goal, 4:55. Lions 6–3. Drive: 12 plays, 66 yards, 6:44.

Third quarter

- MIN – Chester Taylor 17-yard run (Ryan Longwell kick), 10:50. Vikings 10–6. Drive: 5 plays, 61 yards, 2:56.
- DET – Calvin Johnson 71-yard pass from Daunte Culpepper (Jason Hanson kick), 8:45. Lions 13–10. Drive: 3 plays, 80 yards, 2:05.

Fourth quarter

- MIN – Visanthe Shiancoe 11-yard pass from Tarvaris Jackson (Ryan Longwell kick), 11:22. Vikings 17–13. Drive: 11 plays, 90 yards, 5:35.
- DET – Jason Hanson 39-yard field goal, 5:44. Vikings 17–16. Drive: 10 plays, 61 yards, 5:38.
- MIN – Ryan Longwell 50-yard field goal, 0:22. Vikings 20–16. Drive: 10 plays, 57 yards, 5:22.

Top passers

- MIN – Tarvaris Jackson – 8/10, 105 yards, TD
- DET – Daunte Culpepper – 14/24, 220 yards, TD

Top rushers

- MIN – Adrian Peterson – 22 rushes, 105 yards
- DET – Kevin Smith – 21 rushes, 64 yards

Top receivers

- MIN – Visanthe Shiancoe – 5 receptions, 65 yards, TD
- DET – Calvin Johnson – 3 receptions, 84 yards, TD

Next, the Lions stayed at home for a Week 14 NFC North rematch with newly signed veteran quarterback Daunte Culpepper's former team, the Minnesota Vikings. In the first quarter, Detroit was on the board first as kicker Jason Hanson made a 25-yard field goal. In the second quarter, the Lions increased their lead as Hanson kicked a 23-yard field goal. The Vikings closed the half as kicker Ryan Longwell notched a 35-yard field goal.

During the first half, Moran Norris was ejected by referee Jerome Boger for throwing a punch at Minnesota's Napoleon Harris.

In the third quarter, Minnesota took the lead as RB Chester Taylor got a 17-yard TD run. Detroit responded with former Vikings QB Daunte Culpepper completing a 70-yard TD pass to WR Calvin Johnson. However, Minnesota took the lead again as QB Tarvaris Jackson completed an 11-yard TD pass to TE Visanthe Shiancoe. In the fourth quarter, the Lions tried to rally as Hanson made a 39-yard field goal. However, the Vikings pulled away as Longwell nailed a 50-yard field goal with 27 seconds left in the game. On the ensuing kickoff, Aveion Cason received the ball and returned it 25-yards to the Detroit 29-yard line. On the first offensive play, Culpepper was sacked by Ray Edwards for a 5-yard loss, with Culpepper spiking the ball on the next play with 2 seconds left in the game. For the last play of the game Drew Henson came in at quarterback for the Lions, but was sacked by Ellis Wyms to end the game.

Dominic Raiola was fined $7,500 by the Lions after flipping the bird at fans who heckled him during the loss. Raiola later expressed no remorse for his actions, expressing frustration at feeling like a doormat for criticism he felt singled him out for the Lions' ongoing woes.

=== Week 15: at Indianapolis Colts ===
Week 15: Detroit Lions at Indianapolis Colts

Quarter	1	2	3	4	Total
Lions	3	7	3	8	21
Colts	7	14	0	10	31

at Lucas Oil Stadium, Indianapolis, Indiana

- Game time: 1:00 p.m. EDT
- Game weather: None (roof closed)
- Game attendance: 66,281
- Referee: Pete Morelli
- TV announcers (Fox): Thom Brennaman and Brian Billick
- Recap, Game Book

Game information

First quarter

- IND – Dominic Rhodes 1-yard run (Adam Vinatieri kick), 7:38. Colts 7–0. Drive: 14 plays, 78 yards, 7:22.
- DET – Jason Hanson 51-yard field goal, 4:45. Colts 7–3. Drive: 8 plays, 9 yards, 1:15.

Second quarter

- IND – Chad Simpson 1-yard run (Adam Vinatieri kick), 5:29. Colts 14–3. Drive: 9 plays, 54 yards, 3:13.
- DET – Calvin Johnson 33-yard pass from Dan Orlovsky (Jason Hanson kick), 3:36. Colts 14–10. Drive: 3 plays, 69 yards, 1:53.
- IND – Dallas Clark 3-yard pass from Peyton Manning (Adam Vinatieri kick), 0:47. Colts 21–10. Drive: 8 plays, 78 yards, 2:49.

Third quarter

- DET – Jason Hanson 30-yard field goal, 10:00. Colts 21–13. Drive: 12 plays, 27 yards, 2:15.

Fourth quarter

- DET – Kevin Smith 1-yard run (Orlovsky pass to Fitzsimmons), 12:52. Tied 21–21. Drive: 13 plays, 91 yards, 7:39.
- IND – Dominic Rhodes 1-yard run (Adam Vinatieri kick), 8:39. Colts 28–21. Drive: 7 plays, 88 yards, 4:13.
- IND – Adam Vinatieri 31-yard field goal, 0:39. Colts 31–21. Drive: 11 plays, 66 yards, 4:42.

Top passers

- DET – Dan Orlovsky – 23/34, 233 yards, TD
- IND – Peyton Manning – 28/37, 318 yards, TD

Top rushers

- DET – Kevin Smith – 20 rushes, 88 yards, TD
- IND – Dominic Rhodes – 20 rushes, 86 yards, 2 TD

Top receivers

- DET – Calvin Johnson – 9 receptions, 110 yards, TD
- IND – Dallas Clark – 12 receptions, 142 yards, TD

In the last interconference duel of the season, the Lions traveled to Indianapolis to take on the Indianapolis Colts. The Colts struck first when Dominic Rhodes ran in a TD from 1 yard midway through the first quarter. The Lions responded a few minutes later with a 51-yard field goal by Jason Hanson. With just under 6 minutes left in the half, Chad Simpson of the Colts scored a TD from 2 yards. Calvin Johnson of the Lions responded a few minutes later by catching a 33-yard TD pass. The Colts struck back with just under a minute in the half, when Dallas Clark caught a 3-yard TD pass.

The only score by either team in the 3rd quarter was a Jason Hanson 30-yard field goal. In the fourth quarter, Kevin Smith ran in a TD from 1 yard out. The Lions decided to go for the 2-point conversion to tie the score and were successful when Casey Fitzsimmons caught a pass for the conversion. The Colts responded with another Dominic Rhodes 1-yard TD run and put the game out of reach with a 31-yard Adam Vinatieri field goal.

With the loss to the Colts, the Lions became the third team after the 1976 Buccaneers and the 1980 Saints to lose the first fourteen games of a regular season. They were the last team to start 0–14 until the 2016 Browns also did so.

With their 11th straight road loss, the Lions fell to 0–14 and 0–4 against AFC opponents.

=== Week 16: vs New Orleans Saints ===
Week 16: New Orleans Saints at Detroit Lions

Quarter	1	2	3	4	Total
Saints	14	14	14	0	42
Lions	0	7	0	0	7

at Ford Field, Detroit, Michigan

- Game time: 1:00 p.m. EDT
- Game weather: None (indoor stadium)
- Game attendance: 49,309
- Referee: Alberto Riveron
- TV announcers (Fox): Ron Pitts, Tony Boselli and Charissa Thompson (blacked out locally)
- Recap, Game Book

Game information

First quarter

- NO – Robert Meachem 20-yard run (Garrett Hartley kick), 12:23. Saints 7–0. Drive: 5 plays, 41 yards, 2:37.
- NO – Deuce McAllister 2-yard run (Garrett Hartley kick), 1:07. Saints 14–0. Drive: 17 plays, 97 yards, 8:23.

Second quarter

- DET – Kevin Smith 1-yard run (Jason Hanson kick), 9:45. Saints 14–7. Drive: 12 plays, 85 yards, 6:22.
- NO – Mike Bell 1-yard run (Garret Hartley kick), 4:40. Saints 21–7. Drive: 11 plays, 80 yards, 5:05.
- NO – Pierre Thomas 2-yard run (Garret Hartley kick), 0:47. Saints 28–7. Drive: 7 plays, 55 yards, 2:37.

Third quarter

- NO – Marques Colston 6-yard pass from Drew Brees (Garret Hartley kick), 9:33. Saints 35–7. Drive: 3 plays, 76 yards, 1:55.
- NO – Marques Colston 3-yard pass from Drew Brees (Garret Hartley kick), 3:04. Saints 42–7. Drive: 8 plays, 76 yards, 3:56.

Fourth quarter

- No scoring plays

Top passers

- NO – Drew Brees – 30/40, 351 yards, 2 TD
- DET – Dan Orlovsky – 10/23, 125 yards, 2 INT

Top rushers

- NO – Pierre Thomas – 13 rushes, 77 yards, TD
- DET – Kevin Smith – 24 rushes, 111 yards, TD

Top receivers

- NO – Marques Colston – 9 receptions, 99 yards, 2 TD
- DET – Calvin Johnson – 4 receptions, 64 yards

For their last home game of the season, the Lions took on the New Orleans Saints. Detroit trailed early in the first quarter as Saints wide receiver Robert Meachem scored on a 20-yard touchdown run and running back Deuce McAllister scored on a 2-yard touchdown run. The Lions responded in the second quarter with rookie running back Kevin Smith's 1-yard touchdown run. New Orleans answered with running back Mike Bell's 1-yard touchdown run, and running back Pierre Thomas's 2-yard touchdown run. The Saints then closed out the game's scoring in the third quarter with quarterback Drew Brees completing 6-yard and 3-yard touchdown passes to wide receiver Marques Colston.

With the loss, the Lions became the first team in NFL history to have a record of 0–15. They also became the second team to lose fifteen straight in a single season after the 2001 Carolina Panthers, who won their first game, then lost the remainder to finish 1–15. The 2008 Lions were the only team to start 0–15 until the 2017 Browns.

=== Week 17: at Green Bay Packers ===
Week 17: Detroit Lions at Green Bay Packers

Quarter	1	2	3	4	Total
Lions	0	7	7	7	21
Packers	14	0	0	17	31

at Lambeau Field, Green Bay, Wisconsin

- Game time: 1:00 p.m. EDT / 12:00 p.m. CDT
- Game weather: Partly cloudy, 22 °F (−6 °C)
- Game attendance: 70,141
- Referee: Ed Hochuli
- TV announcers (Fox): Chris Rose, John Lynch and Krista Voda
- Recap, Game Book

Game information

First quarter

- GB – DeShawn Wynn 73-yard run (Mason Crosby kick), 8:49. Packers 7–0. Drive: 3 plays, 79 yards, 0:58.
- GB – Jermichael Finley 3-yard pass from Aaron Rodgers (Mason Crosby kick), 1:29. Packers 14–0. Drive: 6 plays, 41 yards, 2:43.

Second quarter

- DET – Calvin Johnson 9-yard pass from Dan Orlovsky (Jason Hanson kick), 11:17. Packers 14–7. Drive: 12 plays, 56 yards, 5:12.

Third quarter

- DET – Calvin Johnson 14-yard pass from Dan Orlovsky (Jason Hanson kick), 10:20. Tied 14–14. Drive: 2 plays, 11 yards, 1:16.

Fourth quarter

- GB – Mason Crosby 36-yard field goal, 13:34. Packers 17–14. Drive: 12 plays, 42 yards, 5:48.
- GB – John Kuhn 5-yard pass from Aaron Rodgers (Mason Crosby kick), 8:34. Packers 24–14. Drive: 7 plays, 42 yards, 3:48.
- DET – Kevin Smith 9-yard run (Jason Hanson kick), 7:32. Packers 24–21. Drive: 4 plays, 80 yards, 1:02.
- GB – Donald Driver 71-yard pass from Aaron Rodgers (Mason Crosby kick), 7:16. Packers 31–21. Drive: 1 play, 71 yards, 0:16.

Top passers

- DET – Dan Orlovsky – 22/42, 225 yards, 2 TD, 2 INT
- GB – Aaron Rodgers – 21/31, 308 yards, 3 TD

Top rushers

- DET – Kevin Smith – 28 rushes, 92 yards, TD
- GB – DeShawn Wynn – 7 rushes, 106 yards, TD

Top receivers

- DET – Calvin Johnson – 9 receptions, 102 yards, 2 TD
- GB – Donald Driver – 6 receptions, 111 yards, TD

In their final opportunity to avoid becoming the first 0–16 team in NFL history, the Lions traveled to Green Bay, Wisconsin to take on their division rivals the Green Bay Packers, whom Detroit had not beaten on the road since 1991. The Packers struck first midway through the first quarter when Deshawn Wynn ran in a career long 73-yard TD. They made it 14–0 when Jermichael Finley caught a 3-yard TD pass near the end of the first quarter. The Lions got on the board in the second quarter when Calvin Johnson caught a 9-yard TD pass. At the end of the half, Will Blackmon called a fair catch as time expired, allowing Mason Crosby to attempt a rare 69-yard field goal. Crosby kicked it accurately but it fell just a yard short with the wind blowing against him. Before the game, Crosby also attempted a 64-yard field goal. Calvin Johnson scored another TD to tie it up in the 3rd quarter when he caught a 14-yard pass. The Packers responded just after the start of the 4th quarter with a 36-yard Mason Crosby field goal, and later with a John Kuhn 5-yard TD catch. The Lions responded less than a minute later with a Kevin Smith 9-yard TD run. The Packers eventually sealed the Lions' fate via a 71-yard TD pass caught by Donald Driver.

Allowing 31 points to the Packers brought the Lions' season total points allowed to 517. This is the third-highest point total allowed in a single season in NFL history, trailing only the 533 allowed by the 1981 Baltimore Colts, and the Lions themselves in 2020, when they allowed 519 points.

== Aftermath ==
A day following the Week 17 loss against the Packers, the Lions fired Rod Marinelli after a 10–38 record as head coach. Defensive coordinator Joe Barry, assistant offensive line coach Mike Barry, defensive line coach Joe Cullen, secondary coach Jimmy Lake, and assistant director of personnel Dave Boller were also fired. Offensive coordinator Jim Colletto was demoted to offensive line coach, and eventually parted ways with the Lions in February 2009.

In the same press release, the Lions announced that, in addition to general manager Martin Mayhew having the "interim" tag removed, Tom Lewand was promoted to team president.

With their guaranteed number-one overall pick in the 2009 NFL Draft, the Lions selected quarterback Matthew Stafford. As the Lions' subsequent franchise quarterback, Stafford set several dozen NFL and franchise records, including the most touchdowns in a game by a rookie quarterback during a Week 11 win against Cleveland in 2009.

== Legacy ==
The 2008 season also marked the end of the "fifty year curse" that ex-quarterback Bobby Layne supposedly placed on the club when he was traded away a half-century earlier. The "curse" is considered a hoax, as there was no reporting of such a statement in 1958, and Layne himself denied saying it. Even so, the phrase "the Lions will not win for fifty years" was grimly ironic, as the 2008 team failed to win even a single game, let alone a championship.

The Lions find themselves in a very familiar position. For 16 weeks, starting in Atlanta back in September, they took the field thinking this was gonna be their day. Sixteen times they were wrong, and now there are no Sundays left. By record, they are the worst team in league history. Zero and sixteen, those are the numbers that will forever be associated with the Detroit Lions.

— Dan Miller, Lions' radio play-by-play announcer on the Detroit Lions Radio Network, December 28, 2008, in the closing seconds of their Week 17 game against the Packers

The Lions became only the second NFL team of the post-merger era to go winless without a tie in the regular season, and the first to go 0–16. (Note: The 1976 Tampa Bay Buccaneers also went winless, but that was when the regular season only had fourteen games.) The Lions ended 2008 having lost 23 of their last 24 regular-season games, going back to the previous season, and a total of seventeen consecutive regular season losses. (Note: The NFL record is 26 by the Buccaneers, who lost the next twelve games following their winless season. The 2020 and 2021 Jacksonville Jaguars lost 20 consecutive games between beating the Indianapolis Colts in Week 1 of 2020 and defeating the Miami Dolphins in Week 6 of 2021.)

On the NFL Network's 'Top 10 Worst Teams of All Time', the 2008 Lions were placed at #1, with the aforementioned Buccaneers teams ranking as the second-worst team(s) ever. Dan Orlovsky's run out of the end zone for a safety during their Week 6 game against the Vikings topped the list of ESPN's Not Top 10 of 2008.

Calvin Johnson tied with Larry Fitzgerald for leading the league in receiving touchdowns, hauling in 12 in 2008. He went on to set an NFL record for most receiving yards in a season, recording 1,964 yards in 2012 and breaking Jerry Rice's previous record. Johnson was also inducted into the Hall of Fame in 2021. Three players went on to participate in Super Bowl XLVIII: Manny Ramirez and Paris Lenon for the Denver Broncos and Cliff Avril for the eventual champion Seattle Seahawks. Practice squad member Jake Nordin was a member of the Las Vegas Locomotives when they won the 2009 UFL Championship.

Defensive end Corey Smith, who recorded an interception and a fumble recovery in 2008, went missing after his boat capsized off of Florida's Gulf Coast, and was declared dead on March 1, 2009. The Lions retired his number 93 for the 2009 season in his honor. Guard Damion Cook died of a heart attack in 2015 at the age of 36.

The last remaining active member of the 2008 Detroit Lions was Don Muhlbach, who retired after the 2020 season.

Tight end Dan Campbell became the Lions head coach prior to the 2021 season. Jon Kitna was the quarterbacks coach for the Dallas Cowboys in 2019, reuniting him with former coach Marinelli, who was the Cowboys' defensive coordinator. Mike Furrey is now the wide receivers coach for the Chicago Bears. Drew Henson, who played for the New York Yankees prior to his NFL career, is now a professional scout in the Yankees organization. Dan Orlovsky retired in 2017, and is now an analyst for ESPN's coverage of NCAA and NFL football. Scot Loeffler went on to join the coaching staff of Urban Meyer at Florida, eventually helping Tim Tebow in his player development, and is now the head coach at Bowling Green. Strong safety Daniel Bullocks is now the safeties coach of the San Francisco 49ers.

== See also ==
- List of winless seasons
- The Curse of Bobby Layne
- 2017 Cleveland Browns season
