= 2007 Detroit Lions season =

NFL team season

- Owner: William Clay Ford Sr.
- General manager: Matt Millen
- Head coach: Rod Marinelli
- Home stadium: Ford Field

Results
- Record: 7–9
- Division place: 3rd NFC North
- Playoffs: Did not qualify
- Pro Bowlers: None

Uniform

The 2007 Detroit Lions season was the 78th season for the team in the National Football League (NFL). After achieving a 6–2 record at the halfway mark, the Lions lost seven of their last eight games. They finished with a 7–9 record for their seventh consecutive losing season. After the 6–2 start, the Lions would go 5–47 in their next 52 games, including a 19-game losing streak between Week 17 of 2007 and Week 2 of 2009, which resulted in the first-ever winless 16-game season in 2008. The Lions improved upon their 3–13 record in 2006 but failed to make the playoffs once again, extending their postseason drought to eight years. The 7–9 record was nonetheless the best record the Lions had in any season under general manager Matt Millen.

The 422 pass completions that Detroit surrendered in 2007 is an NFL record. The 70.1% completion percentage against the Lions defense was the worst in league history until it was broken by the Indianapolis Colts in 2011.

After beating the Chicago Bears, 16–7, at Soldier Field on October 28, the Lions would lose an NFL-record 26 road games in a row, and go 0–8 on the road in each of the following two seasons.

== Draft ==
Round	Pick	Player	Position	Team
1	2	Calvin Johnson	Wide Receiver	Georgia Tech
2	43	Drew Stanton	Quarterback	Michigan State
2	58	Ikaika Alama-Francis	Defensive End	Hawaii
2	61	Gerald Alexander	Safety	Boise State
4	105	A.J. Davis	Cornerback	North Carolina State
4	117	Manuel Ramirez	Guard	Texas Tech
5	158	Johnny Baldwin	Linebacker	Alabama A&M
7	255	Ramzee Robinson	Cornerback	Alabama

== Staff ==
Detroit Lions 2007 coaching staff
Front office: Owner/Chairman – William Clay Ford; Vice chairman – William Clay Ford Jr.; President/CEO – Matt Millen; Executive Vice President/COO – Tom Lewand; Director of pro personnel – Sheldon White; Head coaches: Head coach – Rod Marinelli; Offensive coaches: Offensive coordinator – Mike Martz; Quarterbacks – Adam Gase; Running backs – Wilbert Montgomery; Wide receivers – Kippy Brown; Tight ends – Pat Carter; Offensive line – Jim Colletto; Assistant offensive line – Mike Barry; Offensive assistant – Shawn Jefferson; Offensive assistant – Tim Martz	Defensive coaches: Defensive coordinator – Joe Barry; Defensive line – Joe Cullen; Linebackers – Phil Snow; Defensive backs – Clayton Lopez; Defensive assistant – Fred Reed; Defensive quality control – Don Clemons; Special teams coaches: Special teams – Stan Kwan; Assistant special teams – Sam Gash; Strength and conditioning: Coordinator of physical development – Jason Arapoff; Strength and conditioning – Malcolm Blacken

== Roster ==
Detroit Lions 2007 final roster
Quarterbacks: 8 Jon Kitna; 14 J. T. O'Sullivan; 6 Dan Orlovsky; Running backs: 28 Tatum Bell; 40 Jon Bradley FB; 36 Aveion Cason KR; 45 T. J. Duckett; 34 Kevin Jones; Wide receivers: 87 Mike Furrey PR; 81 Calvin Johnson; 84 Shaun McDonald; 10 Brandon Middleton KR; 86 Troy Walters; Tight ends: 82 Casey FitzSimmons; 49 Sean McHugh; 83 John Owens	Offensive linemen: 76 Jeff Backus T; 72 George Foster T; 64 Edwin Mulitalo G; 66 Stephen Peterman G; 51 Dominic Raiola C; 71 Manny Ramirez G; 67 Blaine Saipaia C/G; 68 Barry Stokes G/T; 65 Damien Woody G/T; Defensive linemen: 91 Ikaika Alama-Francis DE; 75 Shaun Cody DT; 95 Jared DeVries DE; 98 Kalimba Edwards DE; 79 Langston Moore DT; 78 Cory Redding DT; 92 Shaun Rogers DT; 93 Corey Smith DE; 99 Dewayne White DE	Linebackers: 97 Boss Bailey OLB; 52 Anthony Cannon OLB; 55 Buster Davis MLB; 54 Teddy Lehman OLB; 53 Paris Lenon MLB; 59 Alex Lewis OLB; 50 Ernie Sims OLB; Defensive backs: 42 Gerald Alexander FS; 24 Greg Blue SS; 47 Patrick Body CB/S; 25 Fernando Bryant CB; 33 Dovonte Edwards CB; 21 Travis Fisher CB; 26 Kenoy Kennedy SS; 38 Ramzee Robinson CB; 23 Keith Smith CB; Special teams: 4 Jason Hanson K; 2 Nick Harris P; 48 Don Muhlbach LS	Reserve lists: 44 Idrees Bashir S (IR); 27 Daniel Bullocks S (IR); 29 Brian Calhoun RB (IR); 89 Dan Campbell TE (IR); 61 Frank Davis G (IR); 9 John Deraney P (IR); 80 Devale Ellis WR (IR); 35 LaMarcus Hicks S (IR); 73 Jonathan Scott T (IR); 5 Drew Stanton QB (IR); 11 Roy Williams WR (IR); 31 Stanley Wilson Jr. CB (IR); Practice squad: 12 Reggie Ball WR; 16 Ronald Bellamy WR; 77 Jon Dunn T; 70 Claude Harriott DE; 85 Clark Harris LS; 63 Ben Noll G; 39 Israel Route CB; rookies in italics 53 active, 12 inactive, 7 practice squad

== Schedule ==
Week	Date	Opponent	Result	Record	Game site	NFL.com recap
1	September 9	at Oakland Raiders	W 36–21	1–0	Oakland–Alameda County Coliseum	Recap
2	September 16	Minnesota Vikings	W 20–17 (OT)	2–0	Ford Field	Recap
3	September 23	at Philadelphia Eagles	L 21–56	2–1	Lincoln Financial Field	Recap
4	September 30	Chicago Bears	W 37–27	3–1	Ford Field	Recap
5	October 7	at Washington Redskins	L 3–34	3–2	FedExField	Recap
6	Bye					
7	October 21	Tampa Bay Buccaneers	W 23–16	4–2	Ford Field	Recap
8	October 28	at Chicago Bears	W 16–7	5–2	Soldier Field	Recap
9	November 4	Denver Broncos	W 44–7	6–2	Ford Field	Recap
10	November 11	at Arizona Cardinals	L 21–31	6–3	University of Phoenix Stadium	Recap
11	November 18	New York Giants	L 10–16	6–4	Ford Field	Recap
12	November 22	Green Bay Packers	L 26–37	6–5	Ford Field	Recap
13	December 2	at Minnesota Vikings	L 10–42	6–6	Hubert H. Humphrey Metrodome	Recap
14	December 9	Dallas Cowboys	L 27–28	6–7	Ford Field	Recap
15	December 16	at San Diego Chargers	L 14–51	6–8	Qualcomm Stadium	Recap
16	December 23	Kansas City Chiefs	W 25–20	7–8	Ford Field	Recap
17	December 30	at Green Bay Packers	L 13–34	7–9	Lambeau Field	Recap

== Standings ==
NFC North
	W	L	T	PCT	DIV	CONF	PF	PA	STK
^{(2)} Green Bay Packers	13	3	0	.813	4–2	9–3	435	291	W1
Minnesota Vikings	8	8	0	.500	3–3	6–6	365	311	L2
Detroit Lions	7	9	0	.438	3–3	4–8	346	444	L1
Chicago Bears	7	9	0	.438	2–4	4–8	334	348	W2

== Regular season ==
=== Week 1: at Oakland Raiders ===
	1	2	3	4	Total
Lions	0	10	7	19	36
Raiders	0	0	14	7	21

at McAfee Coliseum, Oakland, California

Quarter	1	2	Total
{{{road}}}	{{{R1}}}	{{{R2}}}	0
{{{home}}}	{{{H1}}}	{{{H2}}}	0

at McAfee Coliseum, Oakland, California

- Date: September 9, 2007
- Game attendance: 61,547
- TV: Fox

The Lions began their 2007 campaign on the road in an interconference game against the Oakland Raiders. After a scoreless first quarter, Detroit got off to a fast start in the second quarter. QB Jon Kitna completed a 13-yard TD pass to WR Roy Williams and kicker Jason Hanson connected on a 46-yard field goal. In the third quarter, the Lions increased its lead with Kitna completing a 16-yard TD pass to rookie WR Calvin Johnson. The Raiders, however, started to catch up with QB Josh McCown completing a 4-yard TD pass to WR Ronald Curry along with RB LaMont Jordan getting a 12-yard TD run. In a wild fourth quarter, Hanson gave Detroit a 46-yard field goal, yet the Raiders took the lead with McCown's 7-yard TD pass to FB Justin Griffith. The Lions hung on to take the lead with Kitna's 32-yard TD pass to WR/PR Shaun McDonald, Hanson kicking a 23-yard field goal, and wrapping it up with RB Tatum Bell getting a 14-yard TD run.

With the win, Detroit began its season at 1–0.

=== Week 2: vs. Minnesota Vikings ===
	1	2	3	4	OT	Total
Vikings	0	7	10	0	0	17
Lions	0	10	7	0	3	20

at Ford Field, Detroit, Michigan

Following their road win over the Raiders, the Lions played their Week 2 home opener against their NFC North rival Minnesota Vikings for the lead in the division. After a scoreless first quarter, Detroit pounced first with QB Jon Kitna completing a 9-yard TD pass to WR Roy Williams. The Vikings tied the game with QB Tarvaris Jackson getting a 1-yard TD run. The Lions took the lead prior to halftime with kicker Jason Hanson's 30-yard field goal.

In the third quarter, when Kitna was temporarily out with a concussion, QB J. T. O'Sullivan came in and completed a 7-yard TD pass to Calvin Johnson to increase Detroit's lead. Minnesota, however, tied the game up with kicker Ryan Longwell getting a 32-yard field goal and DE Ray Edwards returning a fumble 9 yards for a touchdown. After both teams failed to score in the fourth quarter, the Vikings got the ball to begin overtime. The Lions forced a fumble nine plays into their drive and eventually got the win with Hanson's 37-yard field goal.

With the win, Detroit improved its record to 2–0.

=== Week 3: at Philadelphia Eagles ===
	1	2	3	4	Total
Lions	7	14	0	0	21
Eagles	21	21	7	7	56

at Lincoln Financial Field, Philadelphia, Pennsylvania

Following their impressive divisional home win over the Vikings, the Lions flew to Lincoln Financial Field for an intraconference fight with the throwback-clad Philadelphia Eagles.

In the first quarter, Detroit trailed early as Eagles RB Brian Westbrook ran 25 yards for a TD. The Lions tied the game on a Kevin Jones 2-yard TD run, but Philadelphia regained the lead with a Westbrook 5 yard TD run, along with QB Donovan McNabb's 68-yard TD pass to WR Kevin Curtis. In the second quarter, the points bonanza continued as McNabb and Curtis hooked up with each other again on a 12-yard TD pass and a 43-yard TD pass to increase the Eagles' lead. Detroit responded with QB Jon Kitna completing TD passes of 11 yards to WR Shaun McDonald and 91 yards to WR Roy Williams. Philadelphia capped the half with McNabb completing a 43-yard TD pass to Westbrook.

In the second half, the Eagles took control as RB Correll Buckhalter ran 1 yard for a TD run in the third quarter and RB Tony Hunt ran for a 1-yard TD in the fourth quarter.

With the loss, the Lions fell to 2–1.

=== Week 4: vs. Chicago Bears ===
	1	2	3	4	Total
Bears	0	7	6	14	27
Lions	3	0	0	34	37

at Ford Field, Detroit, Michigan

Trying to rebound from their road loss to the Eagles, the Lions went home for an NFC North duel with the defending NFC champion Chicago Bears. In the first quarter, Detroit drew first blood with kicker Jason Hanson nailing a 49-yard field goal for the only score of the period. However, in the second quarter, the Bears took the lead with QB Brian Griese (Rex Grossman was benched prior to the game) completing a 15-yard TD pass to WR Muhsin Muhammad for the only score of the period. In the third quarter, Chicago increased its lead with kicker Robbie Gould getting a 49-yard and a 41-yard field goal.

Afterwards, a high-flying fourth quarter began with QB Jon Kitna completing a 4-yard TD pass to WR Shaun McDonald, along with DB Keith Smith returning an interception 64 yards for a touchdown, giving the Lions the lead. However, the Bears regained the lead with WR/KR/PR Devin Hester returning a kickoff 97 yards for a touchdown. Detroit retook the lead with Kitna completing a 15-yard TD pass to WR Troy Edwards, along with RB Kevin Jones getting a 5-yard TD pass. Chicago came close with Griese completing a 1-yard TD pass to WR Bernard Berrian. Afterwards, the Lions sealed their impressive victory with TE Casey Fitzsimmons returning an onside kick 41 yards for a touchdown.

The Lions’ 34 points was the most fourth quarter points in NFL history. There was a combined total of 48 points in the fourth quarter, also an NFL record.

With their wild win, the Lions improved to 3–1.

=== Week 5: at Washington Redskins ===
	1	2	3	4	Total
Lions	0	0	3	0	3
Redskins	0	14	2	18	34

at FedExField, Landover, Maryland

Coming off of their surprising home win over the Bears, the Lions flew to FedExField for a Week 5 intraconference duel with the Washington Redskins. Heading into the game, Detroit had never won a game against the Redskins in Washington, D.C. (0–20)

After a scoreless first quarter, the Lions trailed as in the second quarter when Redskins QB Jason Campbell completed a 7-yard TD pass to TE Chris Cooley, followed by FB Mike Sellers getting a 1-yard TD run. In the third quarter, Detroit managed to get on the board with kicker Jason Hanson getting a 39-yard field goal. However, Washington came right back with DE Andre Carter sacking Lions QB Jon Kitna in the endzone for a safety. In the fourth quarter, the Redskins sealed Detroit's fate with Campbell completing an 8-yard TD pass to Sellers, kicker Shaun Suisham nailing a 28-yard field goal, and CB Carlos Rogers returning an interception 61 yards for a touchdown.

With the loss, not only did the Lions fall to 3–2 heading into their bye week, but lessened their record to 0–21 against the Redskins in Washington, D.C.

=== Week 7: vs. Tampa Bay Buccaneers ===
	1	2	3	4	Total
Buccaneers	0	7	0	9	16
Lions	10	3	3	7	23

at Ford Field, Detroit, Michigan

Coming off their bye week, the Lions were at home and wearing their alternate uniforms for a Week 7 duel with the Tampa Bay Buccaneers. In the first quarter, Detroit attacked first with kicker Jason Hanson getting a 34-yard field goal, along with RB Kevin Jones getting a 1-yard TD run. In the second quarter, the Buccaneers got on the board with QB Jeff Garcia completing a 5-yard TD pass to WR Ike Hilliard. Afterwards, the Lions ended the half with Hanson kicking a 42-yard field goal.

In the third quarter, Detroit increased its lead with Hanson nailing a 32-yard field goal for the only score of the period. In the fourth quarter, the Lions increased its lead with WR Calvin Johnson getting a 32-yard TD run. Afterwards, Tampa Bay worked on a comeback as Garcia completed a 4-yard TD pass to WR Maurice Stovall. Later, the Buccaneers recovered their onside kick and eventually turn it into kicker Matt Bryant's 48-yard field goal. But Detroit erased the Buccaneers' hopes of recovering another onside kick.

With the win, the Lions improved to 4–2, and also surpassed their 2006 win total.

=== Week 8: at Chicago Bears ===
	1	2	3	4	Total
Lions	0	13	0	3	16
Bears	0	0	7	0	7

at Soldier Field, Chicago

Coming off an impressive home win over the Buccaneers, the Lions flew to Soldier Field for Round 2 of their NFC North duel with the Chicago Bears. After a scoreless first quarter, Detroit jumped into the lead with kicker Jason Hanson getting a 26-yard field goal. Afterwards, the Lions increased its lead with RB Kevin Jones getting a 4-yard TD run, while Hanson nailed a 52-yard field goal.

In the third quarter, the Bears threatened Detroit's lead as QB Brian Griese completed a 20-yard TD pass to TE Greg Olsen for the only score of the period. Fortunately, in the fourth quarter, the Lions held on to win as Hanson got a 20-yard field goal.

Detroit's defense was a huge part of this victory, as they intercepted Griese four times, including three times in the endzone.

With their first season-sweep over Chicago since 2004, the Lions improved to 5–2. As a result of their winless 2008 and 2–14 2009 seasons, this became the Lions’ last win on the road until Week 15 of the 2010 season. This also remained their most recent win over a division rival until Week 14 of the 2010 season when the Lions beat the Packers.

=== Week 9: vs. Denver Broncos ===
	1	2	3	4	Total
Broncos	0	0	0	7	7
Lions	3	13	14	14	44

at Ford Field, Detroit, Michigan

Coming off their season-sweeping road win over the Bears, the Lions went home for a Week 9 interconference duel with the Denver Broncos. In the first quarter, Detroit attacked first with kicker Jason Hanson getting a 43-yard field goal for the first score of the game. In the second quarter, the Lions increased their lead with Hanson kicking a 53-yard field goal and QB Jon Kitna completing a 15-yard TD pass to WR Mike Furrey. Detroit ended the half with Hanson kicking a 38-yard field goal.

In the third quarter, the Lions continued their domination as DE Dewayne White returned a fumble 3 yards for a touchdown and Kitna completed a 49-yard TD pass to WR Shaun McDonald. In the fourth quarter, Detroit sealed Denver's doom with NT Shaun Rogers returning an interception 66 yards for a touchdown and RB T. J. Duckett scoring on a 3-yard TD run. The Broncos avoided getting shut out as QB Patrick Ramsey completed a 2-yard TD pass to WR Brandon Stokley.

With the win, the Lions improved to 6–2 for the first time since 1999.

=== Week 10: at Arizona Cardinals ===
	1	2	3	4	Total
Lions	7	0	7	7	21
Cardinals	3	14	7	7	31

at University of Phoenix Stadium, Glendale, Arizona

Coming off their blowout home win over the Broncos, the Lions flew to the University of Phoenix Stadium for a Week 10 duel with the Arizona Cardinals. In the first quarter, Detroit struck first with RB Kevin Jones getting a 4-yard TD run. The Cardinals responded with kicker Neil Rackers nailing a 23-yard field goal. In the second quarter, the Lions trailed as Arizona QB Kurt Warner completed a 1-yard TD pass to WR Larry Fitzgerald, while back-up QB Tim Rattay completed a 2-yard TD pass to TE Leonard Pope.

In the third quarter, the Cardinals increased their lead with Warner completing a 16-yard TD pass to Pope. Detroit responded with QB Jon Kitna completing a 7-yard TD pass to WR Roy Williams. In the fourth quarter, Arizona sealed the win with Warner hooking up with Fitzgerald again on a 20-yard TD pass. The Lions' last score for the game was another 7-yard TD pass from Kitna to Williams.

Along with committing 5 out the game's 9 turnovers, the Lions' rushing attack was held to an embarrassing −18 yards (the fewest in one game since 1946).

With the loss, Detroit fell to 6–3. This defeat marked the beginning of a stretch through week 13 of 2010 in which they went 5–47, which at the time was the worst 52-game stretch in NFL history. This mark has since been passed by the Cleveland Browns, who went 4–48 from 2014 to 2017.

=== Week 11: vs. New York Giants ===
	1	2	3	4	Total
Giants	3	7	3	3	16
Lions	0	0	3	7	10

at Ford Field, Detroit, Michigan

Hoping to rebound from their tough road loss to the Cardinals, the Lions went home for a Week 11 intraconference duel with the New York Giants. In the first quarter, Detroit trailed early as Giants kicker Lawrence Tynes managed to get a 28-yard field goal for the only score of the period. In the second quarter, the Lions continued to trail as QB Eli Manning completed a 10-yard TD pass to RB Brandon Jacobs as the only score.

In the third quarter, Detroit managed to get on the board with kicker Jason Hanson getting a 42-yard field goal, but New York responded with Tynes kicking a 46-yard field goal. In the fourth period, the Giants increased their lead with Tynes nailing a 20-yard field goal. The Lions tried to mount a comeback as QB Jon Kitna completed a 35-yard TD pass to WR Calvin Johnson, but New York managed to hold on for the win.

With the loss, Detroit fell to 6–4.

=== Week 12: vs. Green Bay Packers ===
	1	2	3	4	Total
Packers	0	17	14	6	37
Lions	6	3	3	14	26

at Ford Field, Detroit, Michigan

Trying to snap a two-game skid, the Lions stayed at home for a Week 12 Thanksgiving divisional duel with the Green Bay Packers. In the first quarter, Detroit took the early lead as kicker Jason Hanson got a 47-yard and a 41-yard field goal. However, in the second quarter, the Packers took the lead as QB Brett Favre completed an 11-yard TD pass to WR Greg Jennings, along with RB Ryan Grant getting a 5-yard TD run. The Lions tried to respond as Hanson kicked a 45-yard field goal, yet Green Bay answered with kicker Mason Crosby getting a 20-yard field goal.

In the third quarter, the Packers increased their lead with Favre completing a 4-yard TD pass to Jennings. Detroit continued to try to come back as Hanson kicked a 52-yard FG, yet Green Bay was one step ahead as Favre completed a 3-yard TD pass to WR Ruvell Martin. In the fourth quarter, the Packers added to their lead with Crosby kicking a 20-yard field goal. The Lions tried to mount a comeback as QB Jon Kitna completed a 6-yard TD pass to rookie WR Calvin Johnson, along with RB Kevin Jones getting a 1-yard TD run. However, Green Bay sealed the win with Crosby nailing a 26-yard field goal.

With their third-straight loss (along with their fourth-straight Thanksgiving loss), Detroit fell to 6–5. It would be the last time they would have a winning record at any point in a season until their opening day win over the Bucs in 2011.

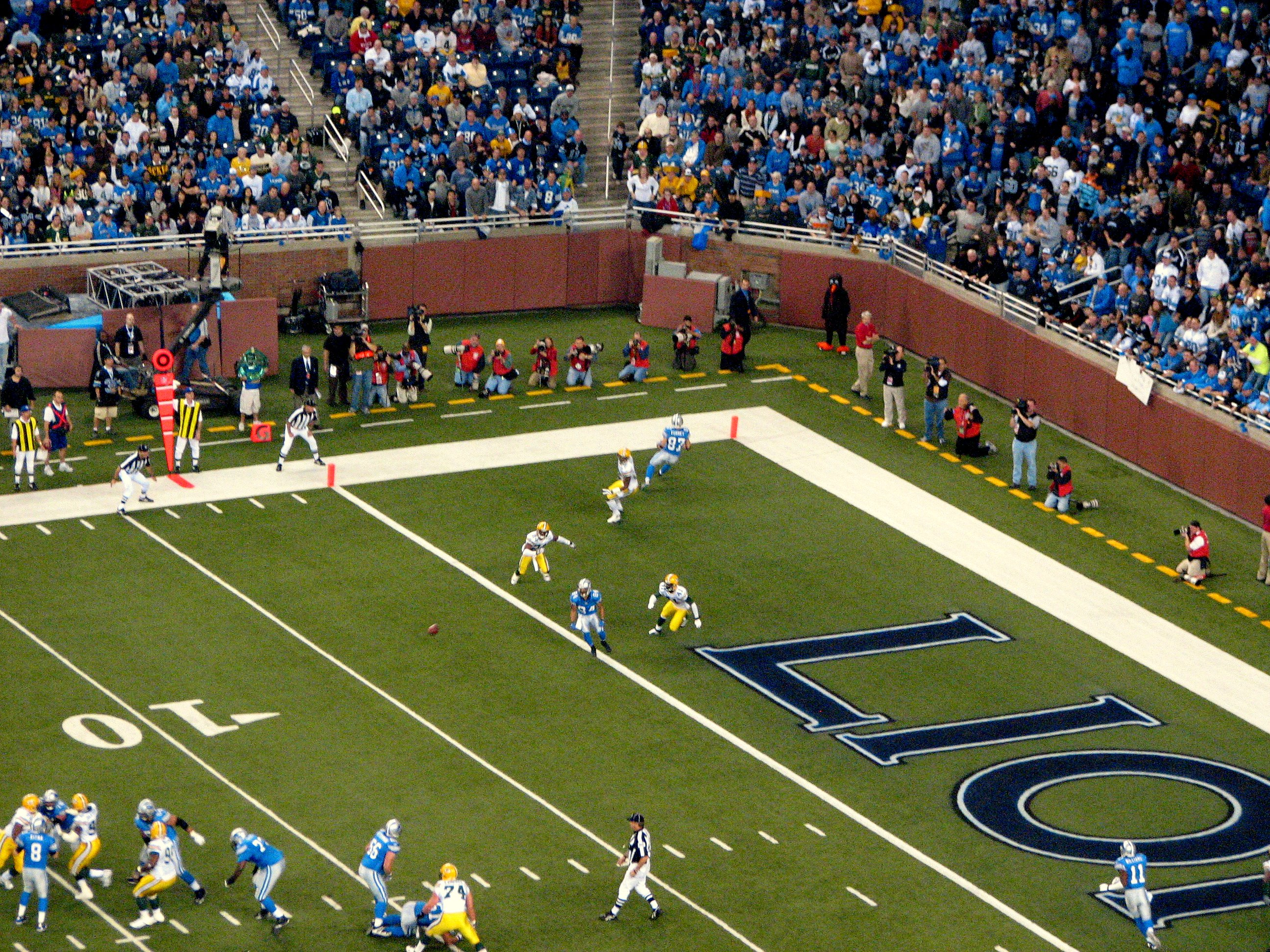
A Detroit passing play

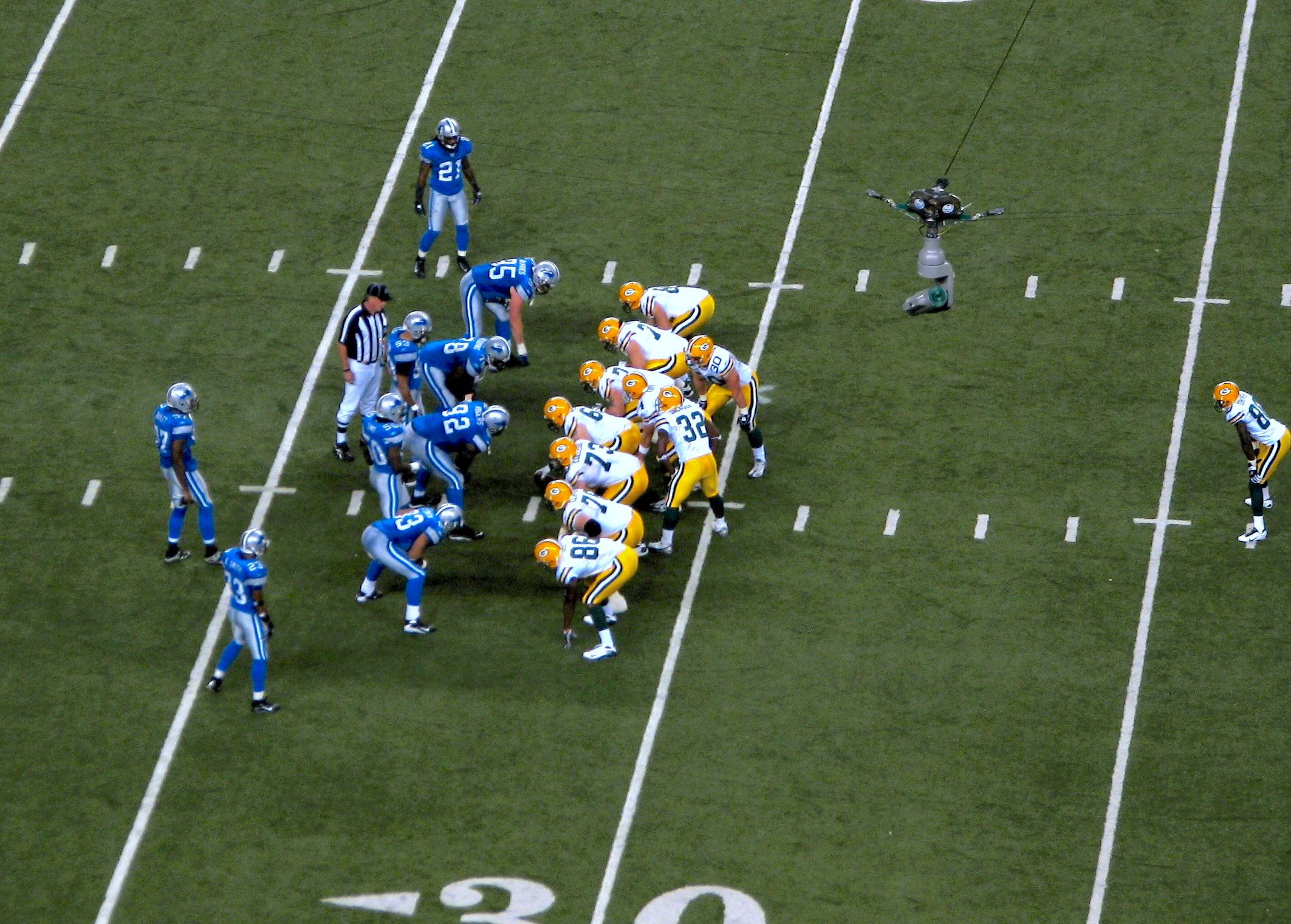
Brett Favre kneels at the end of the game

=== Week 13: at Minnesota Vikings ===
	1	2	3	4	Total
Lions	3	7	0	0	10
Vikings	7	28	7	0	42

at Hubert H. Humphrey Metrodome, Minneapolis, Minnesota

Trying to snap a three-game losing skid, the Lions flew to the Hubert H. Humphrey Metrodome for a Week 13 NFC North rematch with the Minnesota Vikings. In the first quarter, Detroit trailed early as Vikings RB Chester Taylor managed to get a 2-yard TD run. The Lions got on the board with kicker Jason Hanson nailing a 37-yard field goal. In the second quarter, Minnesota replied with RB Adrian Peterson scoring a TD, but Detroit responded with QB Jon Kitna completing a 1-yard TD pass to TE/FB Casey Fitzsimmons. However, the Vikings immediately began a pounding with WR Aundrae Allison returning the kickoff 103 yards for a touchdown, while QB Tarvaris Jackson completed a 6-yard TD pass to WR Bobby Wade, along with a 2-yard TD pass to WR Sidney Rice. In the third quarter, Minnesota ended its day with Peterson getting a 13-yard TD run for the only score of the half.

With their fourth-straight loss, the Lions fell to 6–6.

=== Week 14: vs. Dallas Cowboys ===
	1	2	3	4	Total
Cowboys	0	14	0	14	28
Lions	10	10	7	0	27

at Ford Field, Detroit, Michigan

Trying to end a four-game skid, the Lions went home for a Week 14 intraconference duel with the Dallas Cowboys. In the first quarter, Detroit struck first with RB T.J. Duckett getting a 32-yard TD run, while kicker Jason Hanson getting a 19-yard field goal. In the second quarter, the Cowboys got on the board with RB Marion Barber getting a 20-yard TD run. The Lions responded with Hanson nailing a 36-yard field goal, while RB Kevin Jones getting a 2-yard TD run. Dallas ended the half with QB Tony Romo completing an 8-yard TD pass to Barber.

In the third quarter, Detroit replied with Jones getting a 3-yard TD run for the only score of the period. However, in the fourth quarter, the Cowboys came back and won with Barber getting a 1-yard TD run, followed by Romo’s 16-yard TD pass to TE Jason Witten.

With their fifth straight loss, the Lions fell to 6–7.

=== Week 15: at San Diego Chargers ===
	1	2	3	4	Total
Lions	0	0	14	0	14
Chargers	27	7	10	7	51

at Qualcomm Stadium, San Diego, California

Trying to snap a five-game slide, the Lions flew to Qualcomm Stadium for a Week 15 interconference duel with the San Diego Chargers. In the first quarter, Detroit trailed early as Chargers RB LaDainian Tomlinson managed to get a 6-yard TD run, kicker Nate Kaeding getting a 22-yard field goal, and Tomlinson getting a 2-yard TD run. In the second quarter, the Lions' struggles continued as Kaeding kicked a 22-yard field goal and LB Shaun Phillips returning an interception 18 yards for a touchdown. The Lions got on the board with QB Jon Kitna completing a 9-yard TD pass to WR Brandon Middleton. San Diego ended the half with QB Philip Rivers completing a 1-yard TD to TE Brandon Manumaleuna.

In the third quarter, the Chargers continued their domination as RB Darren Sproles managed to get a 1-yard TD run, while Kaeding nailed a 45-yard field goal. Detroit replied via Kitna's 17-yard TD pass to WR Shaun McDonald. In the fourth quarter, San Diego sealed the win with Sproles getting an 11-yard TD run.

With their sixth-straight loss, the Lions fell to 6–8 and were eliminated from playoff contention the next day when the Minnesota Vikings defeated the Chicago Bears 20–13.

=== Week 16: vs. Kansas City Chiefs ===
	1	2	3	4	Total
Chiefs	0	14	0	6	20
Lions	9	10	3	3	25

at Ford Field, Detroit, Michigan

Trying to halt a six-game losing streak, the Lions returned home to Ford Field for an interconference matchup with the Kansas City Chiefs. Detroit got on the board early with a T.J. Duckett 11-yard TD run and a safety off a blocked Dustin Colquitt punt. In the second quarter, the Lions opened up a 19–0 lead with a Jason Hanson field goal and a Paris Lenon interception return for a touchdown. Kansas City fought back with a Jackie Battle 3-yard run and a 1-yard pass from Damon Huard to Jared Allen to make it 19–14, but the Lions’ Jason Hanson added two more field goals in the second half and the Chiefs could not convert a two-point conversion to Tony Gonzalez in the 3rd after a Dwayne Bowe receiving TD. Detroit held Kansas City off 25–20, ending their long skid.

With the win, the Lions improved to 7–8, 5–3 at home. This remained the Lions last regular-season victory until the third week of the 2009 season, when they would beat the Washington Redskins 19–14 after nineteen consecutive losses including all sixteen games in 2008.

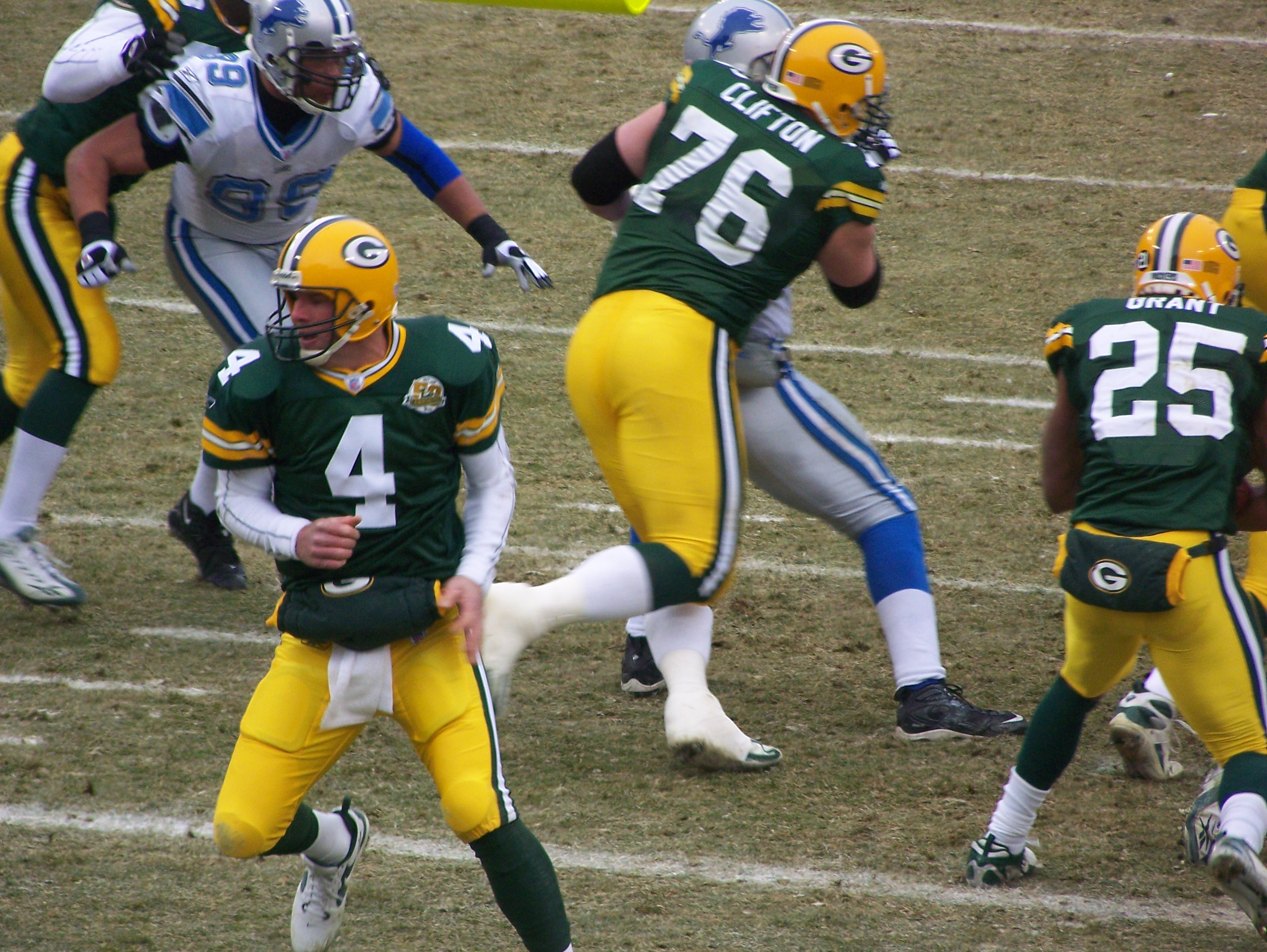
The Lions defensive line battles Green Bay, week 17

=== Week 17: at Green Bay Packers ===
	1	2	3	4	Total
Lions	3	7	3	0	13
Packers	14	7	10	3	34

at Lambeau Field, Green Bay, Wisconsin

Looking for their first win in the state of Wisconsin since 1991, the Lions headed to Lambeau Field for their second game of the year against Brett Favre and the Green Bay Packers. In the first quarter, after a Jason Hanson FG, Ryan Grant and Koren Robinson both scored touchdowns to make it 14–3 Green Bay. In the second quarter, Bubba Franks caught a 4-yard pass from Brett Favre to make it 21–3, but Shaun McDonald scored on a 30-yard pass from Jon Kitna to make it 21–10 at halftime. The teams exchanged field goals to start the third quarter, but on 4th and 2, Craig Nall found Ruvell Martin for a 32-yard score, putting the Packers up 31–13, icing the game. Rookie Mason Crosby added another FG in the fourth to seal up a 34–13 win for the Packers.

With the loss, Detroit closes out the season finishing 7–9.
