= Rod Marinelli =

American football coach (born 1949)

Personal information
- Born: July 13, 1949 (age 77); Rosemead, California, U.S.

Career information
- High school: Rosemead (CA)
- College: Cal Lutheran

Career history
- Rosemead HS (1973–1975) Defensive coordinator; Utah State (1976–1981) Defensive line coach; Utah State (1982) Offensive line coach & special teams coach; California (1983–1991); Defensive line coach (1983–1989); Assistant head coach & defensive line coach (1990–1991); Arizona State (1992–1994) Assistant head coach & defensive line coach; USC (1995) Defensive line coach; Tampa Bay Buccaneers (1996–2005); Defensive line coach (1996–2001); Assistant head coach & defensive line coach (2002–2005); Detroit Lions (2006–2008) Head coach; Chicago Bears (2009–2012); Assistant head coach & defensive line coach (2009); Assistant head coach & defensive coordinator (2010–2012); Dallas Cowboys (2013–2019); Defensive line coach (2013); Defensive coordinator & defensive line coach (2014–2019); Las Vegas Raiders (2020–2021); Defensive line coach (2020); Interim defensive coordinator (2020); Defensive line coach (2021)

Awards and highlights
- Super Bowl champion (XXXVII)

Head coaching record
- Regular season: 10–38 (.208)
- Coaching profile at Pro Football Reference

Rodney Henry Marinelli (born July 13, 1949) is an American former football coach. For 48 consecutive years, he had been a defensive coach for several college and professional teams, serving primarily as a defensive line coach when not assigned as coordinator. Marinelli was the head coach of the NFL's Detroit Lions from 2006 until 2008, during which time he presided over their infamous winless 2008 season.

== Coaching career ==
=== Early career ===
Marinelli's coaching career began in 1973 as an assistant at Rosemead High School in suburban Los Angeles from 1973 to 1975. He earned his first collegiate job in 1976, serving as an assistant to head coach Bruce Snyder at Utah State University until 1982. He then moved on to the University of California for nine seasons, serving as the defensive line coach and, later, the assistant head coach. Marinelli was on staff with Arizona State University for three seasons, again holding a dual role as defensive line coach and assistant head coach, between 1992 and 1994. He spent his final year in college football at the University of Southern California in 1995.

=== National Football League ===
==== Tampa Bay Buccaneers ====
Marinelli went to the Tampa Bay Buccaneers in 1996 and was the defensive line coach for six seasons under head coach Tony Dungy. In the latter four seasons, he also served as assistant head coach, winning a Super Bowl in 2002. He was known for his structured approach and his commitment for trying to get the most out of his players. Marinelli worked to develop linemen, such as Warren Sapp and Simeon Rice, into Hall of Fame caliber players. During Marinelli's tenure in Tampa Bay, the Buccaneers recorded more sacks than any other franchise.

==== Detroit Lions ====
On January 18, 2006, Marinelli was named the head coach of the Detroit Lions, replacing interim head coach Dick Jauron. Marinelli was the third head coach hired (within five seasons) by Lions CEO Matt Millen, preceded by Marty Mornhinweg and Steve Mariucci.

The Marinelli era began poorly, as the Lions lost the first five games of the 2006 season before edging the Buffalo Bills 20–17. The Lions lost seven games in a row between Weeks 10 and 16, before ending the year on a high note by defeating the Dallas Cowboys 39–31.

The 2007 season started off well for the Lions as they started 6–2. However, the Lions lost seven out of their last eight games, finishing third in the NFC North with a 7–9 record for the season.

Despite a perfect 4–0 preseason and being declared Preseason Champs, Marinelli coached the 2008 Lions to a winless 0–16 campaign, the first winless season for any NFL team since the 16-game regular season was instituted in 1978.

On December 29, 2008, Marinelli was fired, in addition to the majority of his coaching staff. The combined record during his three seasons with the Lions was 10–38, one of the worst in NFL history for a head coach with at least three years' experience. Among coaches with at least 10 career wins, only Bert Bell (coaching his own Eagles as an austerity measure) had a worse record (10–46–2); Steve Spagnuolo tied Marinelli's 10–38 record after spending three seasons with the St. Louis Rams from 2009 to 2011.

==== Chicago Bears ====
Marinelli joined the Chicago Bears in January 2009 as assistant head coach and defensive line coach, reuniting him with Lovie Smith, whom he worked with under head coach Tony Dungy in Tampa Bay from 1996 to 2000. Marinelli also interviewed with the Houston Texans and Seattle Seahawks before joining the Bears. He was promoted from defensive line coach to defensive coordinator in February 2010. In the 2010–2012 seasons, Marinelli's defenses ranked ninth, seventeenth, and fifth, respectively, in the league. In 2012, the Bears led the NFL in interceptions (24), as well as in takeaways (44). They were also sixth in third-down efficiency (35.5 percent) and eighth in sacks (41), while ranking third with the fewest points allowed (477). Marinelli left the Bears in January 2013.

==== Dallas Cowboys ====
On January 18, 2013, Marinelli joined the Dallas Cowboys as the defensive line coach. He was promoted to defensive coordinator after the demotion of Monte Kiffin on January 28, 2014.

The Cowboys posted a 12–4 record in Marinelli's first season as defensive coordinator, with his defense ranking 14th in the league.

On January 13, 2015, Marinelli signed a 3-year extension with the Cowboys to remain the defensive coordinator.

==== Las Vegas Raiders ====
On February 5, 2020, Marinelli was named the defensive line coach for the newly relocated Las Vegas Raiders. On December 13, Marinelli was promoted to interim defensive coordinator, following the firing of Paul Guenther.

On February 11, 2022, Marinelli announced that he would be retiring from coaching.

=== Head coaching record ===
| Team | Year | Regular season | | | | | Postseason | | | |
| Team | Year | Won | Lost | Ties | Win % | Finish | Won | Lost | Win % | Result |
|---|---|---|---|---|---|---|---|---|---|---|
| DET | 2006 | 3 | 13 | 0 | .188 | 4th in NFC North | | | | |
| DET | 2007 | 7 | 9 | 0 | .438 | 3rd in NFC North | | | | |
| DET | 2008 | 0 | 16 | 0 | .000 | 4th in NFC North | | | | |
| Total | | 10 | 38 | 0 | .208 | | | | | |

== Personal life ==
Marinelli and his wife, Barbara, have two daughters, Chris and Gina. Chris is married to Joe Barry, the Green Bay Packers' former defensive coordinator.

Marinelli is a veteran of the Vietnam War. He was wounded in Vietnam and contracted malaria.
