= Keith Smith (cornerback) =

American football player (born 1980)

No. 38, 23, 20, 25
- Position: Cornerback

Personal information
- Born: March 20, 1980 (age 46); Leesville, Louisiana, U.S.
- Listed height: 5 ft 11 in (1.80 m)
- Listed weight: 191 lb (87 kg)

Career information
- High school: Leesville
- College: McNeese State
- NFL draft: 2004: 3rd round, 73rd overall pick

Career history
- Detroit Lions (2004–2008); San Francisco 49ers (2009); Omaha Nighthawks (2011)

Career NFL statistics
- Total tackles: 164
- Forced fumbles: 2
- Fumble recoveries: 2
- Pass deflections: 13
- Interceptions: 4
- Defensive touchdowns: 1
- Stats at Pro Football Reference

Keith Smith (born March 20, 1980) is an American former professional football player who was a cornerback in the National Football League (NFL). He played college football for the McNeese State Cowboys before being selected by the Detroit Lions in the third round of the 2004 NFL draft.

Smith was also a member of the San Francisco 49ers and Omaha Nighthawks.

== Professional career ==
=== Detroit Lions ===
Keith Smith debuted for the Detroit Lions of the NFL in 2004. #23 was a solid backup for Detroit into 2008. In 2007, he returned an interception 64 yards for a touchdown.

=== San Francisco 49ers ===
As a free agent following the 2008 season, Keith Smith signed with the San Francisco 49ers. He had five tackles for them on 2010.

On June 18, 2010, San Francisco released Smith.

=== Omaha Nighthawks ===
Keith Smith was signed by the Omaha Nighthawks of the UFL on June 29, of 2011. With a #25 jersey on his back, Smith remained with Omaha through all of 2011.

== NFL career statistics ==
Legend
**Bold**	Career high

Year	Team	Games		Tackles					Interceptions					Fumbles			
Year	Team	GP	GS	Cmb	Solo	Ast	Sck	TFL	Int	Yds	TD	Lng	PD	FF	FR	Yds	TD
2004	DET	15	**2**	39	31	8	0.0	0	1	2	0	2	4	**1**	0	0	0
2005	DET	15	**2**	32	25	7	**1.0**	**2**	0	0	0	0	1	0	0	0	0
2006	DET	**16**	0	22	20	2	0.0	0	0	0	0	0	1	0	**2**	0	0
2007	DET	15	1	**50**	**38**	**12**	0.0	0	**3**	**64**	**1**	**64**	**7**	0	0	0	0
2008	DET	10	0	16	11	5	0.0	0	0	0	0	0	0	**1**	0	0	0
2009	SFO	3	0	5	5	0	0.0	0	0	0	0	0	0	0	0	0	0
		74	5	164	130	34	1.0	2	4	66	1	64	13	2	2	0	0
