= Damion Cook =

American gridiron football player (1979–2015)

No. 72, 71, 74
- Position: Guard

Personal information
- Born: April 16, 1979; Nashville, Tennessee, U.S.
- Died: June 26, 2015 (aged 36)
- Listed height: 6 ft 5 in (1.96 m)
- Listed weight: 330 lb (150 kg)

Career information
- College: Bethune–Cookman
- NFL draft: 2001: undrafted

Career history
- Baltimore Ravens (2001)*; Chicago Bears (2001); Miami Dolphins (2002)*; Baltimore Ravens (2002–2004); Cleveland Browns (2004); Miami Dolphins (2005)*; Hamilton Tiger-Cats (2006–2007); Tampa Bay Storm (2008)*; Detroit Lions (2008–2009); Omaha Nighthawks (2010–2011)
- * Offseason or practice squad member only

Career NFL statistics
- Games played: 26
- Games started: 10
- Total tackles: 2
- Stats at Pro Football Reference
- Stats at CFL.ca (archive)

Damion Lamar Cook (April 16, 1979 – June 26, 2015) was an American professional football guard. He was signed by the Baltimore Ravens as an undrafted free agent in 2001. He played college football at Bethune–Cookman.

Cook was also a member of the Chicago Bears, Miami Dolphins, Detroit Lions, Cleveland Browns, Hamilton Tiger-Cats and Omaha Nighthawks.

Cook made an appearance on Episode 5 of the 2001 Ravens Hard Knocks, remembered for his performance in the rookie talent show.

Cook died from a heart attack on June 26, 2015, at the age of 36.
