= John Owens (American football) =

American football player (born 1980)

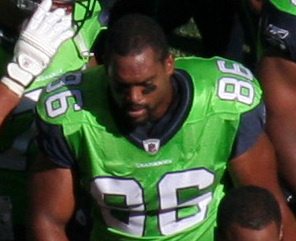
- Owens with the Seattle Seahawks in 2009

No. 83, 82, 86
- Position: Tight end

Personal information
- Born: January 10, 1980 (age 46); Washington, D.C., U.S.
- Listed height: 6 ft 3 in (1.91 m)
- Listed weight: 255 lb (116 kg)

Career information
- High school: DeMatha Catholic (Hyattsville, Maryland)
- College: Notre Dame
- NFL draft: 2002: 5th round, 138th overall pick

Career history
- Detroit Lions (2002–2004); Chicago Bears (2004); Miami Dolphins (2005)*; Cleveland Browns (2005); New Orleans Saints (2006–2007); Detroit Lions (2007–2008); Seattle Seahawks (2009); Oakland Raiders (2010)*
- * Offseason or practice squad member only

Career NFL statistics
- Receptions: 22
- Receiving yards: 178
- Receiving touchdowns: 1
- Stats at Pro Football Reference

John Wesley Owens (born January 10, 1980) is an American former professional football player who was a tight end in the National Football League (NFL). He was selected by the Detroit Lions in the fifth round of the 2002 NFL draft. He played college football for the Notre Dame Fighting Irish.

Owens was also a member of the Chicago Bears, Miami Dolphins, Cleveland Browns, New Orleans Saints, Seattle Seahawks, and Oakland Raiders.

== Early life ==
Owens played high school football at DeMatha Catholic High School in Hyattsville, Maryland as a tight end and defensive end, earning USA Today honorable mention All-American honors. He was also a three-year starter in basketball, averaging 12.7 points and 13.9 rebounds per game his senior year.

== College career ==
Owens played college football for the Notre Dame Fighting Irish from 1998 to 2001. He was a tight end for the majority of his college career, except for his junior year in 2001, where he spent the majority of the year at defensive end. He played in 10 games in 1998 and nine games in 1999. Owens appeared in 12 games in 2000, accumulating nine tackles (seven of which were solo tackles). He caught six passes for 79 yards and one touchdown his senior season in 2001.

== Professional career ==
Owens was selected by the Detroit Lions in the fifth round, with the 138th overall pick, of the 2002 NFL draft. He officially signed with the team on July 22, 2002. He played in 15 games, starting eight, for the Lions in 2002, catching five passes for 49 yards and making one solo tackle. Owens appeared in seven games, starting one, during the 2003 season but recorded no statistics. He was waived by the Lions on October 23, 2004.

Owens signed with the Chicago Bears on October 25, 2004. He played in two games for the Bears in 2004, recording one solo tackle.

On August 29, 2005, He was traded to the Miami Dolphins for Brendon Ayanbadejo. Owens was waived on September 3, 2005.

Owens signed with the Cleveland Browns on December 28, 2005. He was waived by the Browns on September 2, 2006.

He was signed by the New Orleans Saints on November 8, 2006. Owens played in five games for the Saints in 2006, totaling four receptions for 44 yards and one solo tackle. He appeared in eight games during the 2007 season, catching one pass for four yards and making three solo tackles. He was waived on November 10, 2007.

Owens signed with the Lions on November 12, 2007. He played in seven games for the Lions in 2007, totaling one reception for nine yards. He re-signed with the Lions on March 3, 2008. Owens appeared in all 16 games, starting seven, in 2008, catching eight passes for 56 yards and his only NFL touchdown. He also made two solo tackles in 2008.

He was signed by the Seattle Seahawks on March 5, 2009. He played in 16 games, starting three, during the 2009 season, recording three receptions for 16 yards. He was released by the Seahawks on April 6, 2010.

Owens signed with the Oakland Raiders on April 30, 2010. He was released on September 4, 2010.
