= Mike Barry (American football) =

American football coach and former player

Biographical details
- Born: October 18, 1946 (age 80)

Playing career
- 1965–1966: Nebraska
- 1967–1969: Southern Illinois
- Position: Center

Coaching career (HC unless noted)
- 1970–1972: Carbondale HS (IL) (assistant)
- 1973–1976: Fenwick HS (IL) (assistant)
- 1977–1980: Southern Illinois (OL)
- 1980–1983: Arizona (OL)
- 1984: San Antonio Gunslingers (OL)
- 1985: Portland Breakers (OL)
- 1986: Iowa State (OL)
- 1987–1992: Colorado (OL)
- 1993–1997: USC (OL)
- 1998–2002: Tennessee (OL)
- 2003–2005: NC State (OL)
- 2006–2008: Detroit Lions (assistant OL)

Mike Barry (born 10/18/1946) is an American former offensive line coach. He coached for Carbondale Community High School, Fenwick High School, Southern Illinois, Arizona, Iowa State, Colorado, USC, Tennessee, NC State, and the San Antonio Gunslingers and Portland Breakers of the United States Football League (USFL), and the Detroit Lions of the National Football League (NFL). He played college football for Nebraska and Southern Illinois as a center.

== Personal life ==
Barry's son, Joe, was the defensive coordinator for the Green Bay Packers of the National Football League (NFL) from 2021 to 2023.
