= Tom Lewand =

American football executive

Thomas J. Lewand is a Detroit-area business leader and a former executive for the Detroit Lions. The son of lawyer and Detroit economic development leader F. Thomas Lewand, Tom Lewand began his career with the Detroit Lions in 1995. By 2008, he was serving as executive vice president and chief operating officer. On December 29, 2008, he was named President of the Detroit Lions, succeeding Matt Millen, after the team finished the first 0-16 season in NFL history. In his role as president, Lewand oversaw all aspects of the Lions organization. Lewand was fired by the Lions on November 5, 2015.

== Post-Lions career ==
In 2016, Lewand was appointed the CEO of Detroit-based leather and watch company Shinola. He served in that role until the end of 2019. Since March 2020, Lewand has served as the CEO of the Marygrove Conservancy, the non-profit the continues to operate the former Marygrove College campus in Detroit. In September 2021, Lewand took on additional work and returned to the football world as a consultant to Major League Football, a spring football league.

== Personal ==
In his formal education, Lewand holds B.A. (1991), J.D., and M.B.A. degrees (1996) from the University of Michigan. He is married with four daughters.
