= Joe Barry =

American football coach (born 1970)

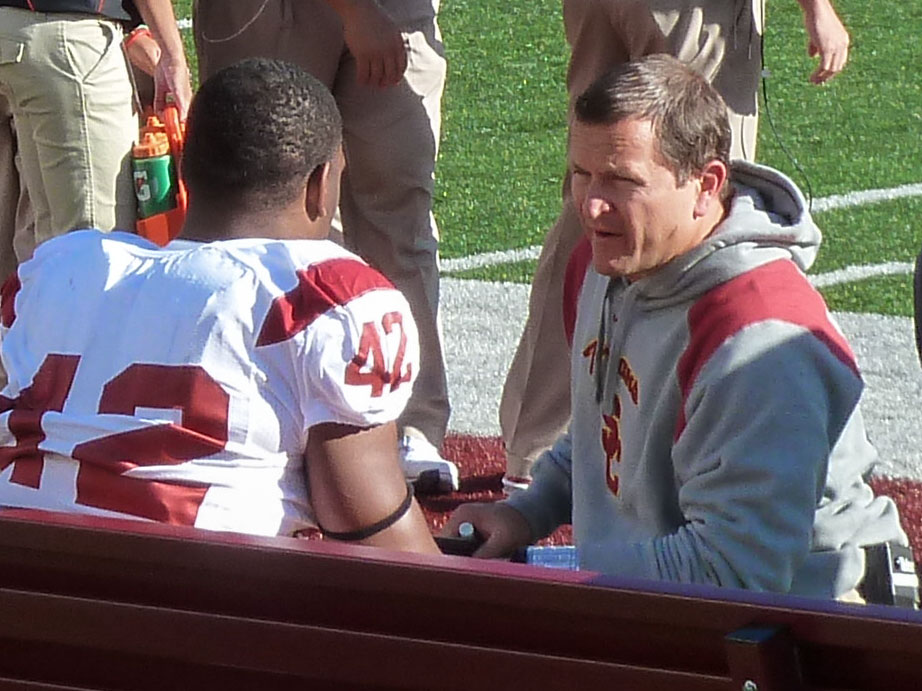
- Barry at USC in 2010

Miami Dolphins
- Title: Run game coordinator/senior defensive assistant

Personal information
- Born: July 5, 1970 (age 56); Boulder, Colorado, U.S.

Career information
- Position: Linebacker
- High school: Fairview (Boulder, Colorado)
- College: Michigan (1989–1990); USC (1991–1993)

Career history
- USC (1994) Video coordinator; USC (1995) Defensive graduate assistant; Northern Arizona (1996–1998) Linebackers coach & defensive ends coach; UNLV (1999) Linebackers coach; San Francisco 49ers (2000) Defensive quality control coach; Tampa Bay Buccaneers (2001–2006) Linebackers coach; Detroit Lions (2007–2008) Defensive coordinator; Tampa Bay Buccaneers (2009) Linebackers coach; USC (2010–2011) Linebackers coach; San Diego Chargers (2012–2014) Linebackers coach; Washington Redskins (2015–2016) Defensive coordinator; Los Angeles Rams (2017–2020) Assistant head coach & linebackers coach; Green Bay Packers (2021–2023) Defensive coordinator; Miami Dolphins (2024–present); Linebackers coach & run game coordinator (2024–2025); Run game coordinator/senior defensive assistant (2026–present)

Awards and highlights
- Super Bowl champion (XXXVII)
- Coaching profile at Pro Football Reference

Joe Barry (born July 5, 1970) is an American football coach who is the run game coordinator and a senior defensive assistant for the Miami Dolphins of the National Football League (NFL). His career includes having served as the assistant head coach and linebackers coach for the Los Angeles Rams, as well as serving as the defensive coordinator for the Washington Redskins, Detroit Lions, and Green Bay Packers. Barry also previously served as an assistant coach for the San Diego Chargers, the Tampa Bay Buccaneers and the San Francisco 49ers. Barry is the son of former coach Mike Barry.

== Early life ==
Barry played linebacker at the University of Michigan from 1989 to 1990 before transferring to the University of Southern California.

== Coaching career ==
=== Early career ===
In 1994, Barry began his coaching career at the University of Southern California (USC), his alma mater, first as a video coordinator for one season, before spending the 1995 season as a graduate assistant, working in particular with the defensive line. In 1996, Barry joined Northern Arizona University as their linebackers and defensive ends coach, and would serve in that role from 1996 to 1998 before being hired as the linebackers coach at UNLV in 1999.

=== San Francisco 49ers ===
In 2000, Barry was hired by the San Francisco 49ers as a defensive quality control coach under defensive coordinator Jim Mora and head coach Steve Mariucci.

=== Tampa Bay Buccaneers (first stint) ===
In 2001, Barry was hired by the Tampa Bay Buccaneers as their linebackers coach under defensive coordinator Monte Kiffin and head coach Tony Dungy. In 2002, Barry, along with Kiffin, were retained by the Buccaneers' new head coach Jon Gruden. That season, the Buccaneers went to Super Bowl XXXVII and defeated the Oakland Raiders to win their first Super Bowl title.

=== Detroit Lions ===
In 2007, Barry was hired by the Detroit Lions as their defensive coordinator under head coach Rod Marinelli, who is also Barry's father-in-law.

At a press conference on December 21, 2008, following the Lions' 42–7 loss to the New Orleans Saints, Detroit News sports columnist Rob Parker addressed a question about Barry to Rod Marinelli, inquiring whether Marinelli wished that his daughter had "married a better defensive coordinator." On January 6, 2009, the Detroit News announced that Parker had resigned from the newspaper the previous week. Following the firing of Marinelli a week after the press conference, Barry was not retained by the Lions. The team finished the season with the first-ever 0-16 record in NFL history.

=== Tampa Bay Buccaneers (second stint) ===
In 2009, Barry was re-hired by the Tampa Bay Buccaneers as their linebackers coach under defensive coordinator Jim Bates and head coach Raheem Morris.

=== USC (second stint) ===
On January 26, 2010, Barry left Tampa Bay to coach under DC Monte Kiffin and HC Lane Kiffin at USC.

=== San Diego Chargers ===
In 2012, Barry was hired by the San Diego Chargers as their linebackers coach under defensive coordinator John Pagano and head coach Norv Turner. In 2013, Barry was retained by new Chargers head coach Mike McCoy.

=== Washington Redskins ===
In 2015, Barry was hired by the Washington Redskins as their defensive coordinator under head coach Jay Gruden. Following the 2016 season, Barry was fired.

=== Los Angeles Rams ===
On January 14, 2017, Barry was hired by the Los Angeles Rams as their assistant head coach and linebackers coach under new head coach Sean McVay. McVay was with Barry as the former offensive coordinator for Washington, who was hired by the Rams two days prior.

=== Green Bay Packers ===
On February 8, 2021, Barry was hired by the Green Bay Packers as their defensive coordinator under head coach Matt LaFleur, replacing Mike Pettine. In his first year coordinating the unit, he developed veteran linebacker De'Vondre Campbell, who was signed as a free agent for a $2 million contract, to First-Team All-Pro honors. His unit finished as the NFL's 9th ranked defense by yards allowed, despite missing star pass-rusher Za'Darius Smith and star cornerback Jaire Alexander for most of the season. During Week 11, his unit shut out Seattle Seahawks quarterback Russell Wilson for the first time in his career.

In their Divisional Round playoff game against the San Francisco 49ers, the Packers' defense intercepted quarterback Jimmy Garoppolo once, while sacking him four times, limiting him to 3 points through 55 minutes, as the Packers led by 7. However, the Packers went on to lose 13–10 after their special teams unit allowed a blocked punt to be returned for a game-tying touchdown with 4:41 left to play. While the Packers' offense was unable to produce on the following drive and was forced to punt with 2 minutes remaining, Barry's defense was unable to come up with a final stop.

After their 2023 season Wild Card playoff game win against the Dallas Cowboys, the Packers became the first #7 seed to advance to the Divisional Round. Barry's defense held Dallas to 16 points, while Green Bay scored 41, until the end of the third quarter.

Green Bay went on to narrowly lose in the Divisional Round playoff game to the 49ers after Barry's defense gave up a 6-yard rushing touchdown from Christian McCaffrey with 1:07 left in the fourth quarter. Green Bay had a seven point lead going into the fourth quarter.

Barry was fired on January 24, 2024.

=== Miami Dolphins ===
On February 19, 2024, Barry was confirmed to be hired by the Miami Dolphins as their linebackers coach/run game coordinator under head coach Mike McDaniel.

== Personal life ==
Barry is married to his wife, Chris Marinelli Barry, and they have four children together: daughters Camryn and Lauren and sons Sam and Nick. Through his marriage with Chris, Barry is the son-in-law to former NFL coach Rod Marinelli.
