= Joe Cullen (American football) =

American football coach (born 1967)

Kansas City Chiefs
- Title: Defensive line coach

Personal information
- Born: December 15, 1967 (age 58); Quincy, Massachusetts, U.S.

Career information
- Position: Nose guard
- College: UMass

Career history
- UMass (1990) Running backs coach; UMass (1991) Defensive line coach; Richmond (1992–1996) Defensive line coach; Richmond (1997–1998) Defensive coordinator; LSU (1999) Defensive line coach; Richmond (2000) Defensive coordinator; Memphis (2001) Defensive line coach; Indiana (2002–2003) Defensive line coach; Indiana (2004) Defensive coordinator; Illinois (2005) Defensive assistant; Detroit Lions (2006–2008) Defensive line coach; Idaho State (2009) Defensive line coach; Jacksonville Jaguars (2010–2012) Defensive line coach; Cleveland Browns (2013) Defensive line coach; Tampa Bay Buccaneers (2014–2015) Defensive line coach; Baltimore Ravens (2016–2020) Defensive line coach; Jacksonville Jaguars (2021) Defensive coordinator; Kansas City Chiefs (2022–present) Defensive line coach

Awards and highlights
- 2× Super Bowl champion (LVII, LVIII)
- Coaching profile at Pro Football Reference

Joe Cullen (born December 15, 1967) is an American football coach who is the defensive line coach for the Kansas City Chiefs of the National Football League (NFL). He previously served as the defensive line coach for the Baltimore Ravens, Tampa Bay Buccaneers, Cleveland Browns and Detroit Lions.

== Early years ==
Cullen was a four-year starting nose guard at the University of Massachusetts Amherst, where he started 45 straight games. He was a three-time All-Yankee Conference selection and was the Minutemen's team MVP in 1989.

He graduated from UMass in 1990 with a bachelor's degree in sports management. He spent a year as a graduate assistant there before becoming a position coach.

== Coaching career ==
=== Early career ===
Cullen's first coaching job was in 1992–98 at the University of Richmond. He coached the defensive line at Louisiana State University in 1999 and at the University of Memphis in 2001. From 2002 to 2003 he was Indiana University's defensive line coach and in 2004 was promoted to defensive coordinator. He was at the University of Illinois in 2005.

=== Detroit Lions ===
In 2006, Cullen was hired by the Detroit Lions as their defensive line coach. Under Cullen, four different Lions players recorded career-high sack numbers.

=== Idaho State ===
In 2009, Cullen joined Idaho State University as their defensive line coach.

=== Jacksonville Jaguars ===
In 2010, Cullen was hired by the Jacksonville Jaguars as their defensive line coach. Under Cullen, the Jaguars overall ranked sixth in yards allowed and fifth in yards per carry.

=== Cleveland Browns ===
In 2013, Cullen was hired by the Cleveland Browns as their defensive line coach. The Browns recorded 41 sacks and allowed 3.9 yards a carry that season. Both were the best the franchise had done in the previous 18 years.

=== Tampa Bay Buccaneers ===
In 2014, Cullen was hired by the Tampa Bay Buccaneers as their defensive line coach under head coach Lovie Smith. Over those two seasons, the Bucs ranked seventh in combined sacks and tackles for loss.

=== Baltimore Ravens ===
In 2016, Cullen was hired by the Baltimore Ravens as their defensive line coach under head coach John Harbaugh.

=== Jacksonville Jaguars (second stint) ===
On February 11, 2021, Cullen was hired by the Jacksonville Jaguars as their defensive coordinator under head coach Urban Meyer. Cullen was not retained following the conclusion of the 2021 season.

=== Kansas City Chiefs ===
On February 5, 2022, Cullen was hired by the Kansas City Chiefs as the team's defensive line coach for the 2022 season. Cullen became a Super Bowl champion in his first season with the Chiefs when they defeated the Philadelphia Eagles 38–35 in Super Bowl LVII. In 2023, Cullen won his second straight Super Bowl when the Chiefs defeated the San Francisco 49ers 25-22 in Super Bowl LVIII.

== Personal life ==
Joe and his wife, Andrea, were married in June 2013 and have three daughters: Julia, Justina, and Jenna.

Cullen has attended Alcoholics Anonymous and been sober since 2006.

Cullen was fired in 2005, shortly after his hire at the University of Mississippi after being charged with drunk and disorderly conduct after passing out in a local Subway.

Cullen was arrested in 2006 for driving under the influence as the defensive line coach of the Detroit Lions. In another incident, also during the 2006 pre-season, he was arrested after he drove through a Wendy's drive-thru naked. He was fined $20,000 and suspended for one game by the NFL for "conduct detrimental to the league" and sentenced by a judge to 10 days of community service and to attend Alcoholics Anonymous meetings.
