= LaMarcus Hicks =

American football player and coach (born 1983)

Northwestern Wildcats
- Title: Cornerbacks coach

Personal information
- Born: April 15, 1983 (age 43); Clarksdale, Mississippi, U.S.
- Listed height: 6 ft 0 in (1.83 m)
- Listed weight: 189 lb (86 kg)

Career information
- Position: Safety (No. 35)
- College: Iowa State
- NFL draft: 2007: undrafted

Career history

Playing
- Detroit Lions (2007–2008)

Coaching
- Rhodes College (2010) Wide receivers coach; Truman HS (MI) (2011–2012) Defensive coordinator & defensive backs coach; Concordia University Ann Arbor (2013) Defensive backs; North Texas (2014–2015) Cornerbacks coach; Jackson State (2016–2017) Safeties coach; Bowling Green (2018–2019) Defensive backs coach; Eastern Michigan (2020–2021) Cornerbacks coach; Utah State (2022–2023) Cornerbacks coach; Northwestern Wildcats (2023–present) Cornerbacks coach

Awards and highlights
- 2× First-team All-Big 12 (2005, 2006)

Career NFL statistics
- Total tackles: 12
- Stats at Pro Football Reference

LaMarcus Hicks (born April 15, 1983) is an American former professional football player who was a safety in the National Football League (NFL). He played college football for the Iowa State Cyclones and was signed by the Detroit Lions as an undrafted free agent in 2007.

Hicks, a defensive back with Iowa State who played professionally with the Detroit Lions, comes to North Texas after spending last season at Concordia University as the defensive backs coach. Hicks played for McCarney at Iowa State for two seasons and earned first-team All-Big 12 honors in 2005 while leading the conference in interceptions. He earned Big 12 Defensive Player of the Week twice that season. Hicks spent 2011 and 2012 at Truman High School in Michigan as the defensive coordinator and defensive backs coach. In his first season at Truman in 2011, he helped the Cougars improve 15 points per game in scoring defense. In 2012, Truman went 9–2 and won their second playoff game in school history while allowing only 11.2 points per game. Hicks began coaching in 2010 at Rhodes College as wide receivers coach. Three players at the position were selected as All-SCAC. Prior to coaching, Hicks played professionally for the Detroit Lions at defensive back. He spent two seasons with the Lions. Hicks received his bachelor's degree from ISU in 2006. A native of Clarksdale, Mississippi, he and his wife Ashley are the parents of Markia, La’Marcus ll, and two sets of twins, Ashton, Auston, Landon, and Layton Hicks.

== Coaching career ==
Hicks has coached defensive backs at numerous institutions, and is currently the cornerbacks coach at Northwestern University.
