= Jon Bradley =

American football player and coach (born 1981)

Kennesaw State Owls
- Title: Defensive line coach

Personal information
- Born: January 13, 1981 (age 45); West Helena, Arkansas, U.S.
- Listed height: 6 ft 0 in (1.83 m)
- Listed weight: 301 lb (137 kg)

Career information
- High school: Barton (AR)
- College: Arkansas State
- NFL draft: 2004: undrafted

Career history

Playing
- Philadelphia Eagles (2004)*; Tampa Bay Buccaneers (2004–2006); Detroit Lions (2007–2008)
- * Offseason or practice squad member only

Coaching
- Arkansas State (2011–2012) Graduate assistant; North Carolina Central (2014–2018) Assistant defensive line coach; Arkansas–Pine Bluff (2019–2021) Associate head coach, defensive coordinator, & defensive line coach; Alcorn State (2022) Co-defensive coordinator & defensive line coach; Jackson State (2023) Defensive coordinator & defensive line coach; South Alabama (2024) Defensive line coach; Kennesaw State (2025–present) Defensive line coach

Awards and highlights
- First-team All-Sun Belt (2003)

Career NFL statistics
- Total tackles: 21
- Sacks: 1
- Rushing attempts: 5
- Rushing yards: 9
- Receptions: 2
- Receiving yards: 10
- Stats at Pro Football Reference

Jon Bradley (born January 13, 1981) is an American college football coach and former defensive tackle. He is the defensive line coach for Kennesaw State University, a position he has held since 2025. He spent his first years in the league as a defensive tackle before switching to fullback in 2007 Detroit Lions mini-camp.
