= Anthony Cannon =

American football player (born 1984)

No. 99, 52
- Position: Linebacker

Personal information
- Born: December 31, 1984 (age 41); Pensacola, Florida, U.S.
- Listed height: 6 ft 0 in (1.83 m)
- Listed weight: 228 lb (103 kg)

Career information
- High school: Stephenson (Stone Mountain, Georgia)
- College: Tulane
- NFL draft: 2006: 7th round, 247th overall pick

Career history
- Detroit Lions (2006–2008); Toronto Argonauts (2011–2012)

Awards and highlights
- First-team All-Conference USA (2005); Third-team All-Conference USA (2004)

Career NFL statistics
- Total tackles: 23
- Fumble recoveries: 1
- Stats at Pro Football Reference

Anthony Devon Cannon (born December 31, 1984) is an American former professional football player who was a linebacker in the National Football League (NFL). He was selected by the Detroit Lions in the seventh round of the 2006 NFL draft. He played college football for the Tulane Green Wave. He was also a member of the Toronto Argonauts of the Canadian Football League (CFL).

== Professional career ==
=== Detroit Lions ===
The Lions drafted Cannon in the seventh round in 2006. He played in 32 games for Detroit over three seasons and made 21 tackles. Cannon was released by the Lions on March 16, 2009, after three seasons with the team.

=== Toronto Argonauts ===
On January 6, 2011, Cannon signed with the Toronto Argonauts of the Canadian Football League. In the 2011 CFL season Cannon accumulated 51 tackles. Cannon was released by the Argonauts prior to the start of the 2012 CFL season
