= 2006 Detroit Lions season =

NFL team season

- Owner: William Clay Ford Sr.
- General manager: Matt Millen
- Head coach: Rod Marinelli
- Offensive coordinator: Mike Martz
- Defensive coordinator: Donnie Henderson
- Home stadium: Ford Field

Results
- Record: 3–13
- Division place: 4th NFC North
- Playoffs: Did not qualify
- Pro Bowlers: WR Roy Williams

Uniform

The 2006 season was the Detroit Lions' 77th in the National Football League (NFL), their 73rd as the Detroit Lions, their fifth playing home games at Ford Field, and their first under head coach Rod Marinelli. The Lions failed to improve on their 5–11 record from the 2005 season, finishing 3–13 and missing the postseason.

The Lions began 2–6 before dropping 7 straight games and falling to a 3–13 record at the end of the season. The offense finished below-average while the defense was the third-worst in the league. Wide receiver Roy Williams was named to the Pro Bowl, finishing with 82 receptions, 1,310 receiving yards, and seven touchdowns; he was the only Lion named to the Pro Bowl.

The passing game was led by full-time starter Jon Kitna, who the Lions acquired in free agency. Kitna passed for 4,208 yards, a career high, and finished with a 21–22 touchdown–interception ratio. The run game was led by third-year running back Kevin Jones who finished with 1209 scrimmage yards and 8 total touchdowns. Dré Bly, Terrence Holt, and Jamar Fletcher finished with a team-high three interceptions, while DL Cory Redding finished with a team-high 8.0 sacks.

== Offseason ==
=== Coaching changes ===
On November 28, 2005, the Lions fired head coach Steve Mariucci and promoted defensive coordinator Dick Jauron to interim head coach. The Lions also fired offensive line coach Pat Morris and tight ends coach Andy Sugarman, while also demoting offensive coordinator Ted Tollner to tight ends coach. Greg Olson was named the offensive coordinator. In the search for their new head coach, San Francisco 49ers assistant head coach Mike Singletary was reportedly interviewed for the job, though later 49ers head coach Mike Nolan would go on to say Singletary was removed from the list of candidates. Jim Haslett, who most recently was the head coach of the New Orleans Saints, also interviewed with the Lions. On January 18, it was reported that Rod Marinelli was nearing a deal with the Lions. A day later, the Lions announced Marinelli as their new head coach. Marinelli had been the defensive line coach for the Tampa Bay Buccaneers since their 1996 season. Marinelli was also interviewed by the Oakland Raiders. After a second interview, Marinelli was scheduled to leave Detroit, but he stayed to negotiate his contract.

On January 29, the Lions named Donnie Henderson as their new defensive coordinator. Henderson had been the defensive coordinator for the New York Jets for the previous two seasons. They also announced Phil Snow as the new linebackers coach. A week later, the Lions would announce Mike Martz as their new offensive coordinator and quarterbacks coach. Martz had been the head coach of the St. Louis Rams since the 2000 season and was fired after a 6–10 season. The Lions also hired Mike Barry as assistant offensive line coach and Clayton Lopez as defensive backs coach.

=== Free agency ===
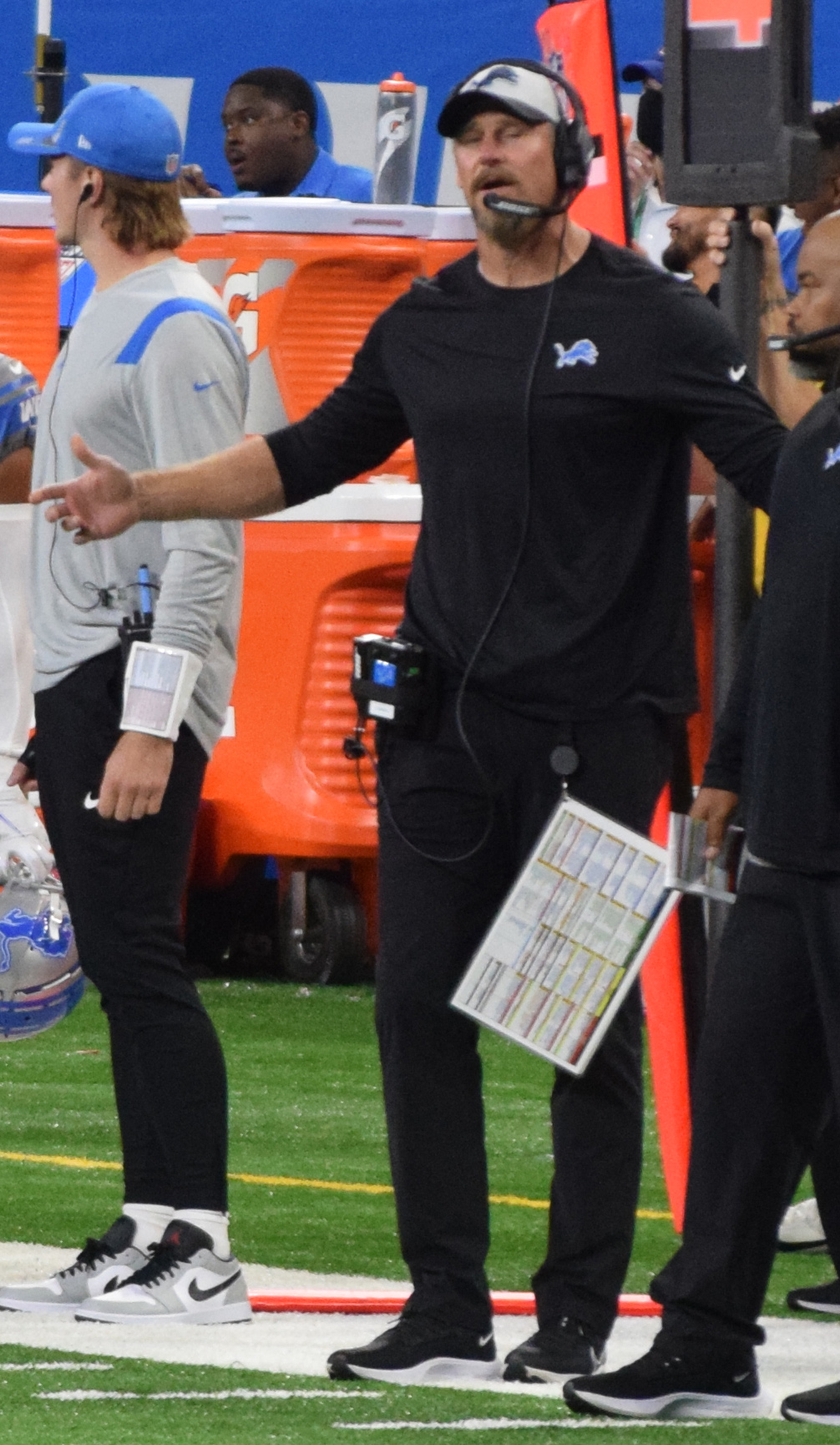
In the offseason, the Lions would acquire tight end and future head coach Dan Campbell.

Offensively, the Lions franchise tagged right tackle Jeff Backus who signed the offer in May. Backus would eventually sign a six-year contract with the team. They also signed quarterback Shaun King to a one-year contract, though he was released a few months later after signing offensive guard Ross Verba. The Lions also re-signed contracts with tight end Casey FitzSimmons, while letting offensive tackle Victor Rogers walk and cutting offensive guard David Loverne. They also signed wide receivers Corey Bradford and Mike Furrey to four and one-year contracts respectively. The Lions would add veteran quarterback Jon Kitna in free agency, while re-signing defensive end Kalimba Edwards and kick returner Eddie Drummond to five-year deals. They also signed quarterback Josh McCown. Shortly after they signed Kitna and McCown, the Lions would trade quarterback and former Lions' third overall pick Joey Harrington to the Miami Dolphins for an undisclosed conditional draft selection. Harrington spent four seasons with the team where he went 18–37 as a starter and accumulated a 60–62 touchdown–interception ratio. The Lions re-signed running back Shawn Bryson to a three-year contract, signed tight end Dan Campbell to a five-year deal, signed offensive tackles Barry Stokes and Courtney Van Buren to three and one-year contracts respectively, and signed center Brock Gutierrez and guard Tyrone Hopson. After the season began, the Lions signed wide receiver and return specialist Az-Zahir Hakim to a one-year deal. Hakim was with the team from 2002 to 2004.

Wide receiver Charles Rogers, whom the Lions picked second overall during the 2003 draft, was cut by the Lions alongside 20 other players shortly before the regular season began. Rogers compiled 36 receptions for 440 yards and four touchdowns in his three seasons with the team. His first two seasons ended with collarbone injuries; during practice in 2003 and during a regular season game in 2004. He was suspended in 2005 for violating the NFL's substance abuse policy. After getting suspended, the Lions filed a grievance with the league and sought to recuperate $10.1 million of his $14.4 million signing bonus. In 2008, the NFL granted the Lions their grievance in amount of $8.2 million. After sitting out of practice and two preseason games, the Lions cut Rogers on September 2. Rogers was reportedly dealing with a sore knee during the offseason which slowed him during training camp, and Marinelli grew disinterested in keeping Rogers on the team.

Defensively, the Lions re-signed defensive end Jared DeVries to a five-year contract, and linebacker LeVar Woods and safety Terrence Holt to one-year deals. They also signed free agent linebacker Paris Lenon to a three-year deal, defensive end Tyoka Jackson to a two-year deal, and safety Idrees Bashir and defensive end Cory Redding to one-year deals. The Lions also released defensive tackle Dan Wilkinson while re-signing linebacker James Davis.

=== Draft ===
2006 Detroit Lions draft
Round	Pick	Player	Position	College	Notes
1	9	Ernie Sims	LB	Florida State	
2	40	Daniel Bullocks	SS	Nebraska	
3	74	Brian Calhoun	RB	Wisconsin	
5	141	Jonathan Scott	OT	Texas	
6	179	Dee McCann	CB	West Virginia	
7	217	Fred Matua	G	USC	
7	247	Anthony Cannon	LB	Tulane	
Made roster † Pro Football Hall of Fame * Made at least one Pro Bowl during career

== Staff ==
2006 Detroit Lions staff
Front office: Owner and chairman – William Clay Ford Sr.; Vice chairman – William Clay Ford Jr.; President and chief executive officer – Matt Millen; Executive vice president and chief operating officer – Tom Lewand; Senior vice president and assistant general manager – Martin Mayhew; Director of pro personnel – Sheldon White; Director of college scouting – Scott McEwen; Assistant director of pro personnel – Charlie Sanders; Head coaches: Head coach – Rod Marinelli; Offensive coaches: Offensive coordinator/quarterbacks – Mike Martz; Running backs – Tom Rathman; Wide receivers – Kippy Brown; Tight ends – Pat Carter; Offensive line – Larry Beightol; Assistant offensive line/tight ends – Sean Kugler; Offensive assistant – Stan Kwan; Coaching assistant – Shawn Jefferson	Defensive coaches: Defensive line – Larry Brooks; Linebackers – Johnny Holland; Defensive backs – George Catavolos; Defensive assistant/quality control – Don Clemons; Defensive assistant – Phil Snow; Special teams coaches: Special teams coordinator – Chuck Priefer; Assistant special teams – Stan Kwan; Strength and conditioning: Strength and conditioning – Jason Arapoff; Assistant strength and conditioning – Malcolm Blacken

== Final roster ==
2006 Detroit Lions roster
Quarterbacks (QB): 8 Jon Kitna; 12 Josh McCown; 9 Dan Orlovsky; Running backs (RB): 36 Aveion Cason KR; 41 Lamar Gordon; 33 Arlen Harris; 30 Cory Schlesinger FB; Wide receivers (WR): 17 Corey Bradford; 18 Eddie Drummond PR; 80 Devale Ellis KR/PR; 87 Mike Furrey; 88 Mike Williams; 11 Roy Williams; Tight ends (TE): 89 Dan Campbell; 82 Casey FitzSimmons; 49 Sean McHugh; 81 Marcus Pollard	Offensive linemen (OL): 76 Jeff Backus T; 61 Frank Davis G; 64 Rick DeMulling G; 60 Dave Pearson C; 66 Stephen Peterman G; 51 Dominic Raiola C; 72 Jonathan Scott T; 77 Clint Stickdorn T; Defensive linemen (DL): 71 Anthony Bryant DT; 95 Jared DeVries DE; 98 Kalimba Edwards DE; 70 Claude Harriott DE; 91 Tyoka Jackson DT; 79 Langston Moore DT; 62 Cleveland Pinkney DT; 78 Cory Redding DE/DT; 93 Corey Smith DE	Linebackers (LB): 97 Boss Bailey OLB; 99 Anthony Cannon OLB; 55 Donté Curry MLB/OLB; 54 Teddy Lehman OLB; 53 Paris Lenon MLB; 59 Alex Lewis OLB; 50 Ernie Sims OLB; Defensive backs (DB): 32 Dré Bly CB/PR; 27 Daniel Bullocks SS; 21 Jamar Fletcher CB; 42 Terrence Holt FS; 26 Kenoy Kennedy SS; 45 Dee McCann CB; 38 Jon McGraw FS/SS; 23 Keith Smith CB; 31 Stanley Wilson Jr. CB; Special teams (ST): 4 Jason Hanson K; 2 Nick Harris P; 48 Don Muhlbach LS	Practice squad: 47 Ran Carthon RB; 46 Marcus Demps S (IR); 84 Glenn Martinez WR (IR); 63 Ben Noll G; 35 Etric Pruitt DB; 58 Matthew Rice DE; 16 Craphonso Thorpe WR; 52 Dave Yovanovits G; Reserve: 94 Marcus Bell DT (IR); 25 Fernando Bryant CB (IR); 24 Shawn Bryson RB (IR); 29 Brian Calhoun RB (IR); 75 Shaun Cody DT (IR); 96 James Hall DE (IR); 69 Tyrone Hopson G (IR); 34 Kevin Jones RB (IR); 43 Will Matthews FB (IR); 92 Shaun Rogers DT (IR); 67 Blaine Saipaia G (IR); 68 Barry Stokes T (IR); 90 Bill Swancutt DE (IR); 74 Rex Tucker T (IR); 73 Ross Verba G (IR); 65 Damien Woody G (IR); Rookies in italics 53 active, 18 reserve, 7 practice squad

== Preseason ==
=== Schedule ===
Week	Date	Opponent	Result	Record	Game site	NFL.com recap
1	August 11	Denver Broncos	W 20–13	1–0	Ford Field	Recap
2	August 18	at Cleveland Browns	L 16–20	1–1	Cleveland Browns Stadium	Recap
3	August 25	at Oakland Raiders	L 3–21	1–2	McAfee Coliseum	Recap
4	August 31	Buffalo Bills	L 13–20	1–3	Ford Field	Recap

== Regular season ==
=== Overview ===
The Lions had two losing streaks, a five-game streak to start the season and a seven-game streak nearing the close of the season. They suffered their sixth-straight losing season finishing 3–13, finished last in the NFC North, and extended their postseason drought to seven seasons. The team finished 21st in offense and 30th in defense. The offense turned the ball over 39 times, good for third-worst in the league. Though the passing game, headed by full-time starter Jon Kitna, attempted the second-most passes in the league, they finished 13th in touchdowns and 27th in interceptions. The run game, headed by Kevin Jones, finished last in the league for attempts and rushing yards. The Lions converted 32.6% of their third downs and scored a touchdown on 40.0% of their red zone visits. Kitna finished with 4,208 yards, a 21–22 touchdown–interception ratio, and a 79.9 passer rating. Jones finished with 1,209 scrimmage yards and 8 scrimmage touchdowns. Wide receiver Roy Williams finished with 1,310 receiving yards and 7 receiving touchdowns, earning himself a Pro Bowl nod. Wide receiver Mike Furrey also finished with 1,086 receiving yards and 6 receiving touchdowns.

Starting linebacker Teddy Lehman was placed on the physically unable to perform (PUP) list, sidelining him for at least six weeks due to a foot injury suffered last season. After the second-half kickoff of the Week 4 matchup against the St. Louis Rams, offensive guard Frank Davis went down with a neck injury and was taken off the field in a stretcher. The next week against the Minnesota Vikings, offensive guard Damien Woody sprained his foot and missed the rest of the season. The Lions also lost starting offensive linemen Ross Verba and Rex Tucker to injuries during the season. Defensive end James Hall, who had five sacks in seven games going into the bye week, and running back Brian Calhoun were put on the injured reserve. After being suspended for four games for violating the NFL's substance use policy after using a substance to help control his weight, defensive tackle Shaun Rogers was placed on the injured reserve. The team also lost running back Kevin Jones to a foot injury and placed him on season-ending injured reserve.

=== Schedule ===
Week	Date	Opponent	Result	Record	Game site	NFL.com recap
1	September 10	Seattle Seahawks	L 6–9	0–1	Ford Field	Recap
2	September 17	at Chicago Bears	L 7–34	0–2	Soldier Field	Recap
3	September 24	Green Bay Packers	L 24–31	0–3	Ford Field	Recap
4	October 1	at St. Louis Rams	L 34–41	0–4	Edward Jones Dome	Recap
5	October 8	at Minnesota Vikings	L 17–26	0–5	Hubert H. Humphrey Metrodome	Recap
6	October 15	Buffalo Bills	W 20–17	1–5	Ford Field	Recap
7	October 22	at New York Jets	L 24–31	1–6	Giants Stadium	Recap
8	Bye					
9	November 5	Atlanta Falcons	W 30–14	2–6	Ford Field	Recap
10	November 12	San Francisco 49ers	L 13–19	2–7	Ford Field	Recap
11	November 19	at Arizona Cardinals	L 10–17	2–8	University of Phoenix Stadium	Recap
12	November 23	Miami Dolphins	L 10–27	2–9	Ford Field	Recap
13	December 3	at New England Patriots	L 21–28	2–10	Gillette Stadium	Recap
14	December 10	Minnesota Vikings	L 20–30	2–11	Ford Field	Recap
15	December 17	at Green Bay Packers	L 9–17	2–12	Lambeau Field	Recap
16	December 24	Chicago Bears	L 21–26	2–13	Ford Field	Recap
17	December 31	at Dallas Cowboys	W 39–31	3–13	Texas Stadium	Recap

== Standings ==
NFC North
	W	L	T	PCT	DIV	CONF	PF	PA	STK
^{(1)} Chicago Bears	13	3	0	.813	5–1	11–1	427	255	L1
Green Bay Packers	8	8	0	.500	5–1	7–5	301	366	W4
Minnesota Vikings	6	10	0	.375	2–4	6–6	282	327	L3
Detroit Lions	3	13	0	.188	0–6	2–10	305	398	W1

== Regular season ==
=== Week 1: vs. Seattle Seahawks ===
	1	2	3	4	Total
Seahawks	0	6	0	3	9
Lions	3	0	0	3	6

at Ford Field, Detroit, Michigan

The Lions opened the regular season at home against the Seattle Seahawks on September 10. The Lions would score first on kicker Jason Hanson’s 44-yard field goal in the first quarter. However, in the second quarter, Seattle would get back in the game with kicker Josh Brown’s 20-yard and 51-yard field goals. After a scoreless third quarter, the Lions would tie in the fourth quarter with Hanson booting a 37-yard field goal, but Seattle got a last-second win with a 42-yard field goal in the closing seconds. With the season-opening loss, the Lions were 0–1.

=== Week 2: at Chicago Bears ===
	1	2	3	4	Total
Lions	0	0	7	0	7
Bears	10	14	7	3	34

at Soldier Field, Chicago, Illinois

The Lions played their first road game of the year, as in Week 2, they played an NFC North battle against the Chicago Bears. From the get-go, the Lions trailed, as they allowed 24 first half points. It came in the form of opposing QB Rex Grossman’s 3-yard TD pass to TE John Gilmore and opposing kicker Robbie Gould’s 32-yard field goal in the first quarter. It also came in the form of a 41-yard TD pass to WR Bernard Berrian and a 31-yard TD pass to TE Desmond Clark. The Lions only score of the game came in the form of QB Jon Kitna getting a 1-yard QB sneak for a TD in the third quarter. The Bears put the game well-out of reach, as a 5-yard TD to TE John Gilmore later in the quarter and a 45-yard field goal by Gould in the fourth quarter sealed Detroit's fate. With the loss, the Lions dropped to 0–2.

=== Week 3: vs. Green Bay Packers ===
	1	2	3	4	Total
Packers	14	3	7	7	31
Lions	14	0	7	3	24

at Ford Field, Detroit, Michigan

Hoping to get win #1, the Lions returned home for an NFC North battle with the Green Bay Packers. The game started off with a close first quarter, as QB Brett Favre threw his 400th career touchdown pass, by completing a short pass to rookie WR Greg Jennings who took the ball 75 yards for a touchdown. Detroit would tie the game up as QB Jon Kitna completed a 37-yard TD pass to RB Shawn Bryson. Green Bay would take the lead again as DB Marquand Manuel returned an interception 29 yards for a touchdown, but the Lions would tie the game again as Kitna completed a 42-yard TD pass to WR Roy Williams as time ran out of the quarter. In the second quarter, however, the Packers retook the lead for the only score of the period, as kicker Dave Rayner booted a 24-yard field goal. In the third quarter, both sides shared a touchdown with each other. Green Bay got a 5-yard TD pass to WR Donald Driver and Detroit got a 5-yard TD run by RB Kevin Jones. In the fourth quarter, the Packers got some distance, as Favre completed a 4-yard TD pass to RB Ahman Green. The Lions would get a 40-yard field goal by kicker Jason Hanson, but that would be as close as Detroit would get, as they dropped yet another game for the 2006 season as the team fell to 0–3.

=== Week 4: at St. Louis Rams ===
	1	2	3	4	Total
Lions	3	14	10	7	34
Rams	13	3	14	11	41

at the Edward Jones Dome, St. Louis, Missouri

The Lions traveled to the Edward Jones Dome to take on the St. Louis Rams, where in this game, Lions Offensive Coordinator Mike Martz would go up against his former team. Detroit fell behind early, as kicker Jeff Wilkins nailed a 42-yard and a 19-yard field goal to give the Rams an early lead. The Lions would get a field goal of their own, as kicker Jason Hanson got a 29-yard field goal. However, before the end of the period, St. Louis increased their lead with QB Marc Bulger completing a 16-yard TD pass to rookie TE Joe Klopfenstein. In the second quarter, Detroit would start to rally, as QB Jon Kitna and WR Mike Furrey connected on two touchdown passes (a 1-yarder and a 10-yarder). The Rams would trail by 1 at halftime, as Wilkins got a 46-yard field goal to end the half as the score was 17 to 16 Lions. In the third quarter, the points continued to climb, St. Louis would regain the lead with Bulger completing a 16-yard TD pass to WR Torry Holt. The Lions would respond with Hanson getting a 20-yard field goal and RB Kevin Jones running 35 yards for a touchdown. However, RB Steven Jackson would help the Rams respond with a 1-yard TD run. In the fourth quarter, Detroit would score again as Jones got a 7-yard TD run. That would be as far as the Lions would get in the game, as the Rams scored 10 unanswered points to end the game, as Wilkins nailed a 47-yard field goal, and Bulger connected with WR Isaac Bruce on a 5-yard TD pass. With their loss, the Lions fell to 0–4.

=== Week 5: at Minnesota Vikings ===
	1	2	3	4	Total
Lions	0	10	7	0	17
Vikings	3	0	0	23	26

at Hubert H. Humphrey Metrodome, Minneapolis, Minnesota

Still looking for their first win, the Lions flew to the Hubert H. Humphrey Metrodome for Week 5, as they played an NFC North match-up with the Minnesota Vikings. The Lions started off with a small deficit as Vikings kicker Ryan Longwell kicked a 26-yard field goal for the only score of the first quarter. In the second quarter, Detroit started to show some offensive dominance, as QB Jon Kitna ran 8 yards for a touchdown, while kicker Jason Hanson kicked a 53-yard field goal. In the third quarter, the Lions seemed to wrap up the victory as TE Dan Campbell caught a 12-yard TD pass for the only score of the period. The Lions fell apart in the fourth quarter, as Vikings QB Brad Johnson completed a 3-yard TD pass to WR Travis Taylor, Vikings LB Ben Leber recovered a fumble in Detroit's endzone for a touchdown, Longwell kicked a 20-yard field goal, and OLB E.J. Henderson returned an interception 45 yards for a touchdown. With their heart-breaking loss, the Lions dropped to 0–5 on the year.

=== Week 6: vs. Buffalo Bills ===
	1	2	3	4	Total
Bills	0	10	0	7	17
Lions	10	7	0	3	20

at Ford Field, Detroit, Michigan

Still searching for their first win, the Lions returned home for a Week 6 match-up with the Buffalo Bills. In the first quarter, Detroit got off to a good start with kicker Jason Hanson kicking a 43-yard field goal and RB Kevin Jones getting a 7-yard TD run. In the second quarter, Buffalo started to catch up with QB J. P. Losman completing a 44-yard TD pass to WR Roscoe Parrish. Fortunately, the Lions responded with QB Jon Kitna throwing a 28-yard pass to WR Roy Williams. The Bills would get a 53-yard field goal by kicker Rian Lindell as time ran out on the half. After a scoreless third quarter, Hanson helped Detroit increase their lead with a 29-yard field goal. The Bills would get one last touchdown, as Losman completed a 4-yard TD pass to TE Ryan Neufeld. As of 2026, however, the Lions haven't beaten the Bills since.

=== Week 7: at New York Jets ===
	1	2	3	4	Total
Lions	0	7	3	14	24
Jets	14	7	0	10	31

at Giants Stadium, East Rutherford, New Jersey

Hoping to build on their win over the Bills, the Lions flew to The Meadowlands and took on the New York Jets. From the get-go, Detroit trailed early as N.Y. RB Leon Washington got a 5-yard TD run, while QB Chad Pennington completed a 44-yard TD pass to WR Justin McCareins. In the second quarter, the Lions got on the board with QB Jon Kitna completing a 22-yard TD pass to WR Roy Williams. However, the Jets responded with RB Kevan Barlow running three yards for a touchdown. In the third quarter, New York continued to fly high as kicker Mike Nugent completed a 33-yard field goal. Even though Detroit would get another touchdown, with Kitna completing a 9-yard TD pass to RB Kevin Jones, the "Gang Green" would finish off the Lions with Washington's 16-yard TD run.

=== Week 9: vs. Atlanta Falcons ===
	1	2	3	4	Total
Falcons	7	7	0	0	14
Lions	10	7	3	10	30

at Ford Field, Detroit, Michigan

Coming off their Bye Week, the Lions were at home for Week 9 as they faced the Atlanta Falcons. In the first quarter, the Lions got off to a fast start, as kicker Jason Hanson nailed a 28-yard field goal, while RB Kevin Jones ran 35 yards for a touchdown. Atlanta would reply with QB Michael Vick completing a 19-yard TD pass to TE Alge Crumpler. In the second quarter, Jones would get a 2-yard TD run for Detroit, while Falcons RB Warrick Dunn got a 1-yard TD run. In the third quarter, the Lions would start to gain huge momentum as Hanson nailed a 19-yard field goal. In the fourth quarter, Detroit put the game away with QB Jon Kitna completing a 60-yard TD pass to WR Roy Williams and Hanson kicking a 36-yard field goal. With the amazing upset victory, the Lions improved to 2–6.

=== Week 10: vs. San Francisco 49ers ===
	1	2	3	4	Total
49ers	10	3	3	3	19
Lions	0	3	7	3	13

at Ford Field, Detroit, Michigan

Hoping to build on their win over the Falcons, the Lions stayed at home for their match-up against the San Francisco 49ers. In the first quarter, the Lions trailed as Niners RB Frank Gore got a 61-yard TD run, while kicker Joe Nedney got a 28-yard field goal. In the second quarter, Nedmey helped San Francisco get a 23-yard field goal, while Lions kicker Jason Hanson got a 25-yard field goal. In the third quarter, Nedney gave the 49ers a 23-yard field goal, while Lions QB Jon Kitna threw an 8-yard TD pass to TE Dan Campbell. In the fourth quarter, Nedney helped the Niners get a 47-yard field goal, while the Lions could only get a 33-yard field goal by Hanson. With the loss, the Lions fell to 2–7.

=== Week 11: at Arizona Cardinals ===
	1	2	3	4	Total
Lions	0	0	3	7	10
Cardinals	0	10	7	0	17

at University of Phoenix Stadium, Glendale, Arizona

Hoping to shake off their home loss to 49ers, the Lions traveled to the University of Phoenix Stadium for a match-up with the Arizona Cardinals. After a scoreless first quarter, the Lions trailed early as QB Matt Leinart hooked up with WR Bryant Johnson on a 2-yard TD pass, while kicker Neil Rackers kicked a 36-yard field goal. In the third quarter, things got more complicated for Detroit as Leinart ran the ball in on a 9-yard TD run. The Lions would finally get on the board with kicker Jason Hanson nailing a 32-yard field goal. In the fourth quarter, even though Detroit would get a 2-yard TD run by RB Arlen Harris, Arizona's defense held the Lions long enough for the win. With the loss, Detroit would fall to 2–8.

=== Week 12: vs. Miami Dolphins ===
	1	2	3	4	Total
Dolphins	7	7	10	3	27
Lions	10	0	0	0	10

at Ford Field, Detroit, Michigan

Trying to snap their two-game losing streak, the Lions went home for their match-up against the Miami Dolphins in the annual Thanksgiving Day game. In the first quarter, the Lions started off strong with QB Jon Kitna completing a 2-yard TD pass to TE Dan Campbell, while kicker Jason Hanson nailed a 52-yard field goal. The Dolphins would respond with QB Joey Harrington (who formerly played for the Lions) threw his first Thanksgiving Day TD pass in the form of an 8-yard TD pass to WR Marty Booker. From there, Miami took control for the rest of the game. In the second quarter, Harrington would throw a 5-yard TD pass to TE Randy McMichael for the only score of the period. In the third quarter, kicker Olindo Mare would nail a 42-yard field goal, while Harrington and Booker hooked up with each other again on a 19-yard TD pass. In the fourth quarter, Mare would kick a 28-yard field goal for the only score of the period, while the Dolphin defense ended up shutting down Detroit's offense. With the loss, the Lions ended up at 2–9.

The game also featured a “Super Bowl”-esque halftime show featuring John Fogerty, who also performed at the Denver Broncos/Kansas City Chiefs game.

=== Week 13: at New England Patriots ===
	1	2	3	4	Total
Lions	0	10	8	3	21
Patriots	3	10	0	15	28

at Gillette Stadium, Foxboro, Massachusetts

Trying to snap their three-game losing streak, the Lions flew to Gillette Stadium for a Week 13 fight with the New England Patriots. In the first quarter, Detroit trailed early as kicker Stephen Gostkowski nailed a 25-yard field goal for the only score of the period. In the second quarter, the Lions took the lead with QB Jon Kitna completing a 5-yard TD pass to WR Mike Furrey, while kicker Jason Hanson got a 29-yard field goal. However, New England would reclaim the lead with RB Corey Dillon’s 6-yard TD run and Gostkowski's 27-yard field goal. In the third quarter, Detroit came right back with Hanson's 38-yard and 49-yard field goal, while DE Jared DeVries sacked Pats QB Tom Brady in his endzone for a safety. In the fourth quarter, Hanson would kick a 26-yard field goal. However, their lead would vanish for good, as Dillon got a 2-yard TD run, which was followed up with Brady successfully completing a 2-point conversion pass to WR Troy Brown. Dillon would then wrap the game up with a 4-yard TD run. With their fourth-straight loss, the Lions fell to 2–10.

=== Week 14: vs. Minnesota Vikings ===
	1	2	3	4	Total
Vikings	14	6	3	7	30
Lions	0	10	3	7	20

at Ford Field, Detroit, Michigan

Trying to snap a four-game skid, the Lions went home for an NFC North rematch with the Minnesota Vikings. In the first quarter, the Lions trailed as Vikings RB Artose Pinner (a former Lion) got a 3-yard and a 4-yard TD run. In the second quarter, Detroit's struggles continued as Vikes QB Brad Johnson got a 3-yard TD run, yet the 2-point conversion failed. Afterwards, the Lions finally got on the board with DB Jamar Fletcher returning an interception 88 yards for a touchdown, while kicker Jason Hanson nailed a 53-yard field goal. In the third quarter, Detroit held Minnesota to a 30-yard field goal by kicker Ryan Longwell, while Hanson kicked a 45-yard field goal. In the fourth quarter, Pinner wrapped things up for the Vikings with a 1-yard TD run. Even though the Lions would get a touchdown, from QB Jon Kitna’s 23-yard strike to RB Kevin Jones, Detroit was plagued with 6 turnovers. They pulled within 10 in the 4th qtr and had a fourth and goal with less than four minutes to play. Needing two scores, inexplicably the Lions went for a touchdown and failed, thus killing any hope for a last minute victory. With their fifth-straight loss, the Lions fell to 2–11.

=== Week 15: at Green Bay Packers ===
	1	2	3	4	Total
Lions	3	0	3	3	9
Packers	3	7	0	7	17

at Lambeau Field, Green Bay, Wisconsin

Still looking for their first road win of 2006 and trying to break a now five-game losing streak, the Lions went to Wisconsin to take on the Green Bay Packers. After the teams traded first-quarter field goals, the Packers took a 10–3 halftime lead thanks to a 14-yard TD run by Vernand Morency. Detroit closed to within a point with two more Jason Hanson field goals, but the Packers settled matters with another touchdown run by Morency, this one from 21 yards out with less than three minutes remaining. Packers quarterback Brett Favre broke Dan Marino’s career completions record during the contest, but also threw three interceptions.

=== Week 16: vs. Chicago Bears ===
	1	2	3	4	Total
Bears	3	14	0	9	26
Lions	7	0	14	0	21

at Ford Field, Detroit, Michigan

Trying to snap a six-game losing skid, the Lions returned home for an NFC North rematch the-now 2-time NFC North champion Chicago Bears. In the first quarter, the Bears struck first with kicker Robbie Gould nailing a 36-yard field goal. Afterwards, the Lions took the lead with QB Jon Kitna completing a 23-yard TD pass to TE Dan Campbell. In the second quarter, Chicago bounced back with QB Rex Grossman completing a 13-yard TD pass to WR Bernard Berrian. Afterwards, RB Adrian Peterson got a 2-yard TD run. In the third quarter, Detroit retook the lead with Kitna completing a 20-yard TD pass to WR Mike Furrey and a 2-yard TD pass to WR Roy Williams. However, in the fourth quarter, the inconsistency that continues to plague the Lions showed as the Bears won with Gould getting a 36-yard field goal, a 39-yard field goal, and a 44-yard field goal and on a dropped pass by Mike Williams in the endzone on the last play of the game. With their seventh-straight loss, the Lions fell to 2–13 as they were swept by their division rivals.

=== Week 17: at Dallas Cowboys ===
	1	2	3	4	Total
Lions	13	7	10	9	39
Cowboys	0	14	10	7	31

at Texas Stadium, Irving, Texas

Trying to end their season on a high note, the Lions played their last game of the year at Texas Stadium against the Dallas Cowboys, where Detroit won 39–31. Jon Kitna threw four touchdown passes. An impressive last-second comeback drive by the Cowboys saw Dallas QB Tony Romo be denied of what could have been the tying score, as he attempted to scramble into the end zone, but was tackled at the Detroit 2. The Lions finished 3–13 on the season, finishing ahead of only the Raiders, who finished 2–14, and clinched the second overall pick in the 2007 NFL draft. They later used this pick on Calvin Johnson.
