= 2003 Detroit Lions season =

NFL team season

- Owner: William Clay Ford Sr.
- General manager: Matt Millen
- Head coach: Steve Mariucci
- Home stadium: Ford Field

Results
- Record: 5–11
- Division place: 4th NFC North
- Playoffs: Did not qualify
- All-Pros: CB Dré Bly (2nd team)
- Pro Bowlers: CB Dré Bly

Uniform

The 2003 season was the Detroit Lions' 74th season in the National Football League (NFL), their 70th as the Detroit Lions, and their first under head coach Steve Mariucci. The team improved upon their 3–13 record from the previous season, finishing 5–11. However, they failed to make the playoffs for the fourth consecutive year, finishing last in the NFC North.

The Lions selected Charles Rogers with the second overall selection in the 2003 NFL draft and brought in a number of defensive free agents, including cornerback Dré Bly on a five-year deal. However, injuries to the defense would hinder the Lions as they finished with the 25th ranked defense in points allowed. The offense performed poorly as they finished 26th in points scored. The run game finished 32nd in yards while the pass game finished 24th in yards. The Lions failed to win more than 5 games, nor did they win a single road game for the third consecutive season. The Lions did, however, allow the least amount of sacks in football for the second consecutive season, with 11.

== Offseason ==
=== Coaching changes ===
After the 2002 season, general manager Matt Millen said that head coach Marty Mornhinweg would return in 2003 despite compiling a 5–27 record over his two seasons with the team. However, Mornhinweg was fired 27 days later. The team hired former San Francisco 49ers head coach Steve Mariucci to a five-year, $25 million contract. Mariucci was fired after the 49ers loss in the 2003 postseason; he had compiled a 57–39 record with the team and two division titles in his six-year head coaching tenure with the team. The hiring process drew allegations that the team violated the Rooney Rule, an NFL policy requiring NFL teams to consider at least one minority candidate for head coach. The league investigated and fined general manager Matt Millen $200,000 for "failing to interview a minority head coaching candidate". Owner William Clay Ford Sr. said that Commissioner Paul Tagliabue was "singling out the Lions" and that he had "lost a lot of respect for [him]."

The Lions' previous offensive coordinator and running backs coach Maurice Carthon was hired by the Dallas Cowboys. The Lions hired Sherman Lewis as their offensive coordinator and wide receivers coach, while hiring Bobby Williams as their running backs coach. They also fired wide receivers coach Larry Kirksey and linebackers coach Glenn Pires.

=== Free agency ===
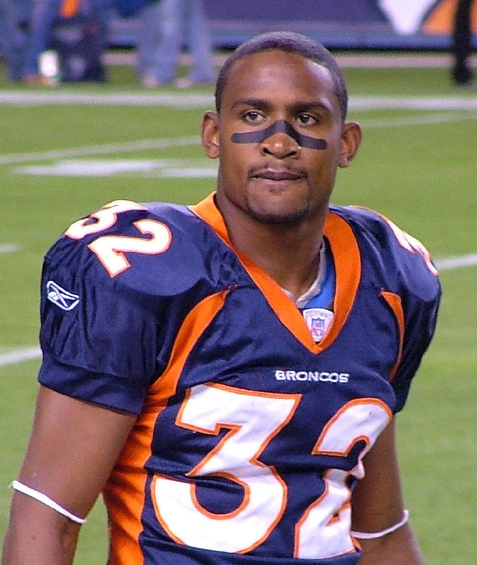
The Lions signed cornerback Dré Bly, a highly touted free agent, to a five-year, $24.5 million contract.

The Lions bolstered their defense by signing linebackers Earl Holmes and Wali Rainer, defensive lineman Dan Wilkinson, and cornerbacks Dré Bly and Otis Smith. After losing linebacker Chris Claiborne, the Lions signed Rainer and Holmes to one-year and three-year contracts respectively, with Holmes coming in as a seven-year veteran. Wilkinson was signed after starting tackle Luther Elliss suffered a torn pectoral. Bly signed a five-year, $24.5 million deal and was rated as the best corner in free agency. They lost cornerback Todd Lyght to retirement and brought back linebacker Brian Williams and defensive tackle Jared DeVries on a one-year and three-year deal respectively.

Adding to their offense, they signed wide receiver Shawn Jefferson to a one-year deal. They also signed fullback Cory Schlesinger to a two-year extension and brought in running back Shawn Bryson on a one-year deal. Tight end Mikhael Ricks was re-signed to a three-year deal.

The Lions released wide receivers Germane Crowell and former Super Bowl MVP Desmond Howard. Following a 2-day team minicamp, the Lions released wide receiver Jacquez Green and quarterback Jonathan Beasley.

=== NFL draft ===
With the second overall selection, the Lions chose wide receiver Charles Rogers. Rogers was a fan favorite in Michigan and set school records for receiving yards and touchdowns for Michigan State. He also signed endorsements with Pepsi and EA Sports prior to his selection. However, Rogers' career was marred by injuries and suspensions, leading to him playing only three years in the league. Their second round pick, linebacker Boss Bailey, played for the Lions until 2007 and produced 7.0 sacks and thirteen passes defended. Third round selection defensive end Cory Redding moved to defensive tackle and became the highest paid player at his position in 2007. He would be traded away following the 2008 season. Running back Artose Pinner, the Lions' fourth round selection, accumulated 915 total yards and 5 total touchdowns over his three seasons with Detroit. Defensive back Terrence Holt, who eventually moved to free safety in 2005, racked up eight interceptions in his four years with the Lions.

2003 Detroit Lions draft
Round	Pick	Player	Position	College	Notes
1	2	Charles Rogers	WR	Michigan State	
2	34	Boss Bailey	LB	Georgia	
3	66	Cory Redding	DT	Texas	
4	99	Artose Pinner	RB	Kentucky	
5	137	Terrence Holt	S	NC State	
5	144	James Davis	LB	West Virginia	
6	175	David Kircus	WR	Grand Valley State	
7	216	Ben Johnson	OT	Wisconsin	
7	220	Blue Adams	CB	Cincinnati	From Arizona
7	236	Brandon Drumm	RB	Colorado	From Cleveland via San Diego and Dallas
7	260	Travis Anglin	WR	Memphis	supplemental compensatory
Made roster † Pro Football Hall of Fame * Made at least one Pro Bowl during career

=== Undrafted free agents ===
2003 undrafted free agents of note
Player	Position	College
Curt Anes	Quarterback	Grand Valley State
Casey FitzSimmons	Tight end	Carroll (MT)
Chris Kern	Defensive back	Mount Union

== Personnel ==
=== Staff / Coaches ===
2003 Detroit Lions staff
Front office: Owner and chairman – William Clay Ford Sr.; Vice chairman – William Clay Ford Jr.; President and chief executive officer – Matt Millen; Executive vice president and chief operating officer – Tom Lewand; Senior vice president of football administration/legal counsel – Martin Mayhew; Director of pro personnel – Sheldon White; Director of college scouting – Scott McEwen; Assistant director of pro personnel – Charlie Sanders; College scouting coordinator – Russ Bolinger; Head coaches: Head coach – Steve Mariucci; Assistant head coach/linebackers – Richard Smith; Offensive coaches: Offensive coordinator – Sherman Lewis; Quarterbacks – Kevin Higgins; Running backs – Tom Rathman; Wide receivers – Bobby Williams; Tight ends – Sean Kugler; Offensive line – Carl Mauck; Offensive assistant – Andy Sugarman	Defensive coaches: Defensive coordinator – Kurt Schottenheimer; Defensive line – George Dyer; Secondary – Ray Horton; Defensive assistant – Don Clemons; Defensive assistant – Johnny Holland; Special teams coaches: Special teams – Chuck Priefer; Assistant special teams/offense – Kevin O'Dea; Strength and conditioning: Strength and conditioning – Jason Arapoff; Assistant strength and conditioning – Malcolm Blacken; Assistant strength and conditioning – Mondray Gee

=== Roster ===
2003 Detroit Lions roster
Quarterbacks (QB): 14 Ty Detmer; 3 Joey Harrington; 8 Mike McMahon; Running backs (RB): 24 Shawn Bryson; 31 Avon Cobourne; 33 Olandis Gary; 21 Artose Pinner; 30 Cory Schlesinger FB; 40 Paul Smith FB; 36 Stephen Trejo FB; Wide receivers (WR): 18 Eddie Drummond; 81 Az-Zahir Hakim; 11 David Kircus; 84 Bill Schroeder; 10 Reggie Swinton; 16 James Williams; Tight ends (TE): 82 Casey FitzSimmons; 83 John Owens; 86 Mikhael Ricks	Offensive linemen (OL): 76 Jeff Backus T; 77 Kerlin Blaise G/T; 61 Ray Brown G; 75 Matt Joyce G/T; 70 Josh Lovelady G; 73 Stockar McDougle T; 51 Dominic Raiola C; Defensive linemen (DL): 90 Colin Cole DT; 95 Jared DeVries DE; 94 Luther Elliss DT; 96 James Hall DE; 91 Robert Porcher DE; 93 Kelvin Pritchett DT; 78 Cory Redding DE; 92 Shaun Rogers DT; 72 Dan Wilkinson DT	Linebackers (LB): 97 Boss Bailey OLB; 55 Donté Curry OLB; 52 James Davis MLB; 59 Jeff Gooch OLB; 54 Barrett Green OLB; 50 Earl Holmes MLB; 58 Wali Rainer OLB; Defensive backs (DB): 32 Dré Bly CB; 44 Julius Curry FS; 39 Doug Evans CB; 31 Terrence Holt SS; 41 Leonard Myers CB; 23 Otis Smith CB; 28 Bracy Walker SS; 45 Brian Walker FS; Special teams (ST): 4 Jason Hanson K; 2 Nick Harris P; 57 Jody Littleton LS	Practice squad: 43 Charles Drake S; 74 Ben Johnson T; 27 Chris Kern CB; 60 David Miller G; 66 Kaulana Noa T; Reserve: 88 Scotty Anderson WR (IR); 89 Bradford Banta LS (IR); 79 Eric Beverly G (IR); 26 Rod Babers CB (IR); 29 Chris Cash CB (IR); 98 Kalimba Edwards DE (IR); 35 André Goodman CB (IR); 25 Corey Harris S (IR); 87 Shawn Jefferson WR (IR); 19 John Jett P (IR); 67 Shawn Lazarus DT (IR); 80 Charles Rogers WR (IR); 71 Victor Rogers T (IR); 34 James Stewart RB (IR); 99 Brian Williams LB (IR); Rookies in italics 53 active, 15 reserve, 5 practice squad

== Preseason ==
Detroit played their first preseason game against the Pittsburgh Steelers. To begin the game, punter John Jett was able to pin the Steelers within their 2-yard line which paid off when Lions Barrett Green sacked Tommy Maddox in the endzone for the safety and early 2–0 lead. The Steelers tacked on two field goals before the Lions scored on a Joey Harrington pass to Scotty Anderson. Detroit extended their lead with a Mike McMahon rushing touchdown and a Cory Redding fumble recovery touchdown. The Steelers could only muster another touchdown before the Lions sealed the 26–13 win with a field goal. For their second game of the preseason, the Lions traveled to Paul Brown Stadium to face off against the Cincinnati Bengals. After three punts, the Bengals scored on three straight Neil Rackers field goals with the Lions adding their own field goal before the half with the Bengals up 9–3. The Bengals scored on a Carson Palmer touchdown pass to Jeremi Johnson before another Palmer pass, this time to T. J. Houshmandzadeh, put them up 23–3 heading into the fourth. The Lions tacked on another touchdown to reach the final score of 23–10.

For their third preseason game, the Lions hosted the Cleveland Browns. The Browns failed to capitalize on an early Harrington interception and punted. Detroit started the scoring off with a Hanson 23-yard field goal before the Browns responded with a 6-yard touchdown pass. After punting, the Lions got the ball back after the Browns fumbled and scored on a 4-yard touchdown pass to go up 10–7. The Browns tied it up with 30 seconds left on a 46-yard field goal, but the Lions scored their own field goal to put the halftime score at 13–10. The Lions blew the game wide open with a Hanson field goal and then two McMahon touchdown passes before the Browns responded with a Tim Couch touchdown pass to go into the fourth quarter with the score at 31–17. Detroit was able to score another touchdown to solidify the final score of 38–17. For their final preseason game, the Lions traveled to Ralph Wilson Stadium to face off against the Buffalo Bills. The Bills opened up the scoring when they returned the first punt of the game 75 yards for the touchdown. They extended their lead with a 34-yard touchdown pass to go up 14–0 heading into the second quarter. The Lions got on the board when a Buffalo fumble at their own 4-yard line was recovered in the endzone for the score. They scored two Hanson field goals to end the first half down 14–13. Beginning the second half, the Lions scored a go-ahead 46-yard field goal. The Bills responded on an eleven-minute touchdown drive to get to the final score of 22–16.

Week	Date	Opponent	Result	Record	Venue	Attendance
1	August 9	Pittsburgh Steelers	W 26–13	1–0	Ford Field	58,735
2	August 16	at Cincinnati Bengals	L 10–23	1–1	Paul Brown Stadium	39,956
3	August 21	Cleveland Browns	L 38–17	2–1	Ford Field	59,333
4	August 28	at Buffalo Bills	L 16–22	2–2	Ralph Wilson Stadium	45,593

== Regular season ==
=== Overview ===
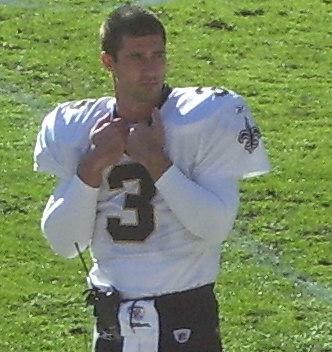
In his sophomore season, quarterback Joey Harrington started all 16 games for Detroit, throwing a career high 22 interceptions.

The Lions were plagued with injuries before the regular season began. In May, wide receiver Scotty Anderson was stabbed outside a nightclub alongside his brother. Starting defensive tackle Luther Elliss suffered a torn pectoral in July, although it wouldn't require surgery and he would be back on the field before the regular season started. Two rookies were injured; Charles Rogers dislocated his finger in training camp and required stitches and James Davis injured his ribs. Two starters were lost to season ending injuries: James Stewart and Chris Cash to shoulder and knee injuries respectively. After the regular season began, injuries still piled up. Charles Rogers broke his collarbone in practice on October 7, ending his rookie season. They also lost punter John Jett to a calf injury and signed Nick Harris. During the Week 3 matchup against the Minnesota Vikings, André Goodman dislocated his shoulder and was out for the season. Dré Bly, Robert Porcher, Rod Babers, and Jimmy Wyrick also dealt with injuries. Victor Rogers and Chris Watson suffered back injuries and were put on injured reserve. During the Week 14 matchup against the San Diego Chargers, safety Corey Harris and long snapper Bradford Banta were lost for the season with a torn hamstring and broken collarbone respectively.

The Lions began their season 1–6 and finished 5–11, fourth in the NFC North and thirteenth in the NFC, and were eliminated from playoff contention in Week 14. The offense finished last in the league in yards and 26th in points scored. The passing game, led by second year quarterback and third overall pick Joey Harrington, had the fourth-most attempts but finished 24th in passing yards. The rushing game was the league's worst; 32nd in both rushing attempts and yards, and 30th in rushing touchdowns. The defense finished 25th and 24th in points allowed and yards allowed respectively, with the passing defense finishing 28th and 29th in yards and touchdowns and the rushing defense finishing in the middle of the league at 15th in rushing yards allowed. The Lions broke an NFL record for the most consecutive road losses with 24, one more than the previous record holder Houston Oilers from 1981 to 1984. They broke the record in their last road game of the season in a Week 16 game against the Carolina Panthers. Individually, quarterback Harrington threw a career-high 22 interceptions in his 16 starts. Az-Zahir Hakim led the team in receiving yards with 449 and Shawn Bryson lead the team in rushing yards with 606. Cornerback Dré Bly, on the back of six interceptions, 15 passes defended, and 60 combined tackles, was named to the Pro Bowl and second team All-Pro, the only Lion to make either team.

=== Schedule ===
In addition to their regular games with NFC North divisional rivals, the Lions played teams from the NFC West and AFC West according to the NFL's schedule rotation, and also played games against the Carolina Panthers and Dallas Cowboys, who had finished fourth in their respective divisions in 2002.

Week	Date	Opponent	Result	Record	Venue	Attendance
1	September 7	Arizona Cardinals	**W** 42–24	1–0	Ford Field	60,691
2	September 14	at **Green Bay Packers**	**L** 6–31	1–1	Lambeau Field	70,244
3	September 21	**Minnesota Vikings**	**L** 13–23	1–2	Ford Field	60,865
4	September 28	at Denver Broncos	**L** 16–20	1–3	Invesco Field at Mile High	75,719
5	October 5	at San Francisco 49ers	**L** 17–24	1–4	Candlestick Park	67,365
6	Bye					
7	October 19	Dallas Cowboys	**L** 7–38	1–5	Ford Field	61,160
8	October 26	at **Chicago Bears**	**L** 16–24	1–6	Soldier Field	61,428
9	November 2	Oakland Raiders	**W** 23–13	2–6	Ford Field	61,561
10	November 9	**Chicago Bears**	**W** 12–10	3–6	Ford Field	61,492
11	November 16	at Seattle Seahawks	**L** 14–35	3–7	Seahawks Stadium	65,865
12	November 23	at **Minnesota Vikings**	**L** 14–24	3–8	Hubert H. Humphrey Metrodome	63,946
13	November 27	**Green Bay Packers**	**W** 22–14	4–8	Ford Field	62,123
14	December 7	San Diego Chargers	**L** 7–14	4–9	Ford Field	61,544
15	December 14	at Kansas City Chiefs	**L** 17–45	4–10	Arrowhead Stadium	77,922
16	December 21	at Carolina Panthers	**L** 14–20	4–11	Ericsson Stadium	72,835
17	December 28	St. Louis Rams	**W** 30–20	5–11	Ford Field	61,006
Note: Intra-division opponents are in **bold** text

=== Game summaries ===
All game reports use the Pro Football Researchers' gamebook archive as a source.

==== Week 1: vs. Arizona Cardinals ====
Week 1: Arizona Cardinals at Detroit Lions – Game summary

Quarter	1	2	3	4	Total
Cardinals	7	7	10	0	**24**
**Lions**	7	7	14	14	**42**

at Ford Field, Detroit, Michigan

- Date: September 7, 2003
- Game time: 1:00 p.m. EDT/11:00 p.m. MDT
- Game weather: None (indoor stadium)
- Game attendance: 60,691
- Referee: Bill Carollo
- Box score

Game information

**First quarter**

- ARI – Anquan Boldin 7-yard pass from Jeff Blake (Bill Gramatica kick good), 5:48. Arizona 7–0 **Drive: 11 plays, 80 yards, 6:39.**
- DET – Charles Rogers 4-yard pass from Joey Harrington (Jason Hanson kick good), 2:00. Tied 7–7 **Drive: 8 plays, 58 yards, 3:48.**

**Second quarter**

- DET – Charles Rogers 13-yard pass from Joey Harrington (Jason Hanson kick good), 11:27. Detroit 14–7 **Drive: 6 plays, 29 yards, 3:03.**
- ARI – Freddie Jones 12-yard pass from Jeff Blake (Bill Gramatica kick good), 5:35. Tied 14–14 **Drive: 9 plays, 71 yards, 5:52.**

**Third quarter**

- ARI – Anquan Boldin 71-yard pass from Jeff Blake (Bill Gramatica kick good), 13:59. Arizona 21–14 **Drive: 3 plays, 72 yards, 1:01.**
- DET – Eddie Drummond 57-yard punt return (Jason Hanson kick good), 8:21. Tied 21–21
- DET – Cory Schlesinger 8-yard pass from Joey Harrington (Jason Hanson kick good), 3:12. Detroit 28–21 **Drive: 2 plays, 35 yards, 0:50.**
- ARI – Bill Gramatica 38-yard field goal, 0:44. Detroit 28–24 **Drive: 7 plays, 41 yards, 2:28.**

**Fourth quarter**

- DET – Bill Schroeder 5-yard pass from Joey Harrington (Jason Hanson kick good), 11:43. Detroit 35–24 **Drive: 6 plays, 36 yards, 2:51.**
- DET – Dré Bly 48-yard interception return (Jason Hanson kick good), 10:50. Detroit 42–24

**Top passers**

- ARI – Jeff Blake – 28/46, 358 yards, 3 TD, INT
- DET – Joey Harrington – 17/30, 195 yards, 4 TD

**Top receivers**

- ARI – Anquan Boldin – 10 receptions, 217 yards, 2 TD
- DET – Mikhael Ricks – 2 receptions, 43 yards

**Top rushers**

- ARI – Emmitt Smith – 13 rushes, 64 yards
- DET – Olandis Gary – 12 rushes, 44 yards

For their season and home opener, the Lions hosted the Arizona Cardinals. The Lions took the opening kickoff and were forced to punt. The Cardinals took their first drive 11 plays to reach the endzone on an Anquan Boldin pass from Jeff Blake. The Lions responded with a touchdown of their own from Joey Harrington to Charles Rogers to tie the game at 7 apiece. A short Cardinals punt left the Lions with great field position, which they capitalized on with a Harrington touchdown pass to Rogers to go up 14–7. The Cardinals responded with another long scoring drive when Freddie Jones brought in a 12-yard touchdown pass to put the score at 14–14 going into halftime.

The Cardinals took the second half kickoff and scored with a Blake 71-yard pass to Boldin. The Lions punted on the responding drive. The Lions defense held the Cardinals to a three-and-out. On the punt return, Eddie Drummond returned the punt 57-yards for the touchdown to tie the game again at 21–21. The Cardinals failed to respond and punted. The Lions were held to a three-and-out and punted. On the catch, Boldin muffed the ball and it was recovered by Donté Curry. The Lions capitalized with a Cory Schlesinger 8-yard pass from Harrington to give the Lions their first lead of the day at 28–21. The Cardinals responded with a field goal drive to bring them within 4 at 28–24. The Lions punted on their next drive. On the first play of the next Cardinals drive, Blake was strip sacked which was recovered by James Hall. The Lions once again capitalized with a Bill Schroeder 5-yard score. The Cardinals failed to respond when Blake threw an errant pass that was intercepted by Dré Bly and returned 48 yards for the touchdown to bring the Lions lead to 42–24. The Cardinals had two drives to score but punted on each, sealing the Lions' first win of the season.

==== Week 2: at Green Bay Packers ====
Week 2: Detroit Lions at Green Bay Packers – Game summary

Quarter	1	2	3	4	Total
Lions	0	6	0	0	**6**
**Packers**	14	3	7	7	**31**

at Lambeau Field, Green Bay, Wisconsin

- Date: September 14, 2003
- Game time: 1:00 p.m. EDT/12:00 p.m. CST
- Game weather: Rain, 63 °F (17.2 °C)
- Game attendance: 70,244
- Referee: Bernie Kukar
- Box score

Game information

**First quarter**

- GB – Ahman Green 65-yard rush (Ryan Longwell kick good), 14:08. Green Bay 7–0 **Drive: 2 plays, 78 yards, 0:58.**
- GB – Tony Fisher 5-yard pass from Brett Favre (Ryan Longwell kick good), 4:26. Green Bay 14–0 **Drive: 13 plays, 59 yards, 8:42.**

**Second quarter**

- DET – Jason Hanson 22-yard field goal, 12:20. Green Bay 14–3 **Drive: 6 plays, 11 yards, 2:40.**
- GB – Ryan Longwell 46-yard field goal, 8:22. Green Bay 17–3 **Drive: 9 plays, 43 yards, 3:58.**
- DET – Jason Hanson 52-yard field goal, 0:00. Green Bay 17–6 **Drive: 5 plays, 21 yards, 0:33.**

**Third quarter**

- GB – Robert Ferguson 14-yard pass from Brett Favre (Ryan Longwell kick good), 10:18. Green Bay 24–6 **Drive: 3 plays, 19 yards, 0:49.**

**Fourth quarter**

- GB – Al Harris 56-yard interception return (Ryan Longwell kick good), 10:18. Green Bay 31–6

**Top passers**

- DET – Joey Harrington – 26/55, 241 yards, 3 INT
- GB – Brett Favre – 15/28, 132 yards, 2 TD, INT

**Top receivers**

- DET – Shawn Bryson – 5 receptions, 48 yards
- GB – Antonio Freeman – 4 receptions 32 yards

**Top rushers**

- DET – Shawn Bryson – 7 rushes, 43 yards
- GB – Ahman Green – 23 rushes, 160 yards, TD

For their first road game of the season, the Lions visited the Green Bay Packers. The Packers took the opening kickoff and scored on the third play with an Ahman Green 65-yard rushing touchdown. The Lions were held to a three-and-out before the Packers scored again on a Brett Favre pass to Tony Fisher. After three straight punts, the Lions scored on a Jason Hanson 22-yard field goal. The Packers responded with a 46-yard field goal from Ryan Longwell. After five more punts, Dré Bly nabbed an interception from Favre with 0:33 left in the first half. The Lions scored with a Hanson 52-yard field goal to end the first half.

The Lions opened the second half with the ball, but gave it away on a Harrington interception. The Packers were held to a three-and-out and punted, but got it right back when Harrington threw another interception. The Packers capitalized with a Favre pass to Robert Ferguson. Six drives with no scores preceded an Al Harris 56-yard interception return touchdown to put the Packers up 31–6. The Lions failed to score on their last two drives to solidify their 6–31 loss and dropped to 1–1.

==== Week 3: vs. Minnesota Vikings ====
Week 3: Minnesota Vikings at Detroit Lions – Game summary

Quarter	1	2	3	4	Total
**Vikings**	0	16	7	0	**23**
Lions	10	0	3	0	**13**

at Ford Field, Detroit, Michigan

- Date: September 21, 2003
- Game time: 1:00 p.m. EDT/12:00 p.m. CST
- Game weather: None (indoor stadium)
- Game attendance: 60,865
- Referee: Tom White
- Box score

Game information

**First quarter**

- DET – Shawn Bryson 5-yard run (Jason Hanson kick good), 11:00. Detroit 7–0 **Drive: 7 plays, 59 yards, 4:00.**
- DET – Jason Hanson 27-yard field goal, 0:52. Detroit 10–0 **Drive: 7 plays, 16 yards, 2:52.**

**Second quarter**

- MIN – Daunte Culpepper 14-yard run (Aaron Elling bad snap), 12:02. Detroit 10–6 **Drive: 3 plays, 36 yards, 0:57.**
- MIN – Daunte Culpepper 2-yard run (Aaron Elling kick good), 4:57. Minnesota 13–10 **Drive: 6 plays, 98 yards, 2:51.**
- MIN – Aaron Elling 21-yard field goal, 0:05. Minnesota 16–10 **Drive: 6 plays, 77 yards, 0:38.**

**Third quarter**

- DET – Jason Hanson 37-yard field goal, 10:21. Minnesota 16–13 **Drive: 8 plays, 39 yards, 4:21.**
- MIN – Kelly Campbell 72-yard pass from Gus Frerotte (Aaron Elling kick good), 7:52. Minnesota 23–13 **Drive: 6 plays, 85 yards, 2:29.**

**Fourth quarter**

- No scoring plays

**Top passers**

- MIN – Gus Frerotte – 8/19, 184 yards, TD, INT
- DET – Joey Harrington – 24/42, 235 yards, 3 INT

**Top receivers**

- MIN – Randy Moss – 3 receptions, 85 yards
- DET – Charles Rogers – 6 receptions, 54 yards

**Top rushers**

- MIN – Moe Williams – 13 rushes, 95 yards
- DET – Shawn Bryson – 17 rushes, 49 yards, TD

In Week 3, the Lions hosted the Minnesota Vikings. The Lions took the opening kickoff and scored with a Shawn Bryson 5-yard run. The Vikings responded by driving down field and attempting a 37-yard field goal, but Aaron Elling missed it wide right. Both teams punted before the Lions began their next drive with great field position after an Eddie Drummond return. The Lions settled for a Jason Hanson 27-yard field goal, which was made to bring the Lions' lead to 10–0. After two punts, the Vikings ended the shutout with a Daunte Culpepper 14-yard rushing touchdown, which, after a bad snap on the extra point, brought the score to 10–6. Joey Harrington threw an interception on the next drive, and the Vikings capitalized by taking the lead with a Culpepper 2-yard rushing touchdown. On that touchdown, Culpepper was injured and ruled out. After a Lions punt, the Vikings extended their lead with an Elling field goal to bring the halftime score to 16–10.

The second half began with a Gus Frerotte interception which the Lions capitalized on with a 37-yard field goal to bring the score to 16–13. The Vikings responded with a Kelly Campbell 72-yard touchdown pass that put the score at 23–13. On their next five drives, the Lions failed to score as Harrington was intercepted twice, the team punted twice, and one turnover on downs as the Lions lost to drop to 1–2.

==== Week 4: at Denver Broncos ====
Week 4: Detroit Lions at Denver Broncos – Game summary

Quarter	1	2	3	4	Total
Lions	7	3	0	6	**16**
**Broncos**	7	7	3	3	**20**

at Invesco Field at Mile High, Denver, Colorado

- Date: September 28, 2003
- Game time: 4:15 p.m. EDT/2:15 p.m. MDT
- Game weather: Sunny, 66 °F (18.9 °C)
- Game attendance: 75,719
- Referee: Ron Blum
- Box score

Game information

**First quarter**

- DET – Charles Rogers 33-yard pass from Joey Harrington (Jason Hanson kick good), 7:07. Detroit 7–0 **Drive: 5 plays, 73 yards, 3:01.**
- DEN – Ashley Lelie 29-yard pass from Jake Plummer (Jason Elam kick good), 1:56. Tied 7–7 **Drive: 9 plays, 80 yards, 5:11.**

**Second quarter**

- DEN – Shannon Sharpe 1-yard pass from Jake Plummer (Jason Elam kick good), 10:36. Denver 14–7 **Drive: 8 plays, 56 yards, 4:41.**
- DET – Jason Hanson 53-yard field goal, 6:00. Denver 14–10 **Drive: 10 plays, 45 yards, 4:36.**

**Third quarter**

- DEN – Jason Elam 53-yard field goal, 1:17. Denver 17–10 **Drive: 9 plays, 57 yards, 4:43.**

**Fourth quarter**

- DET – Scotty Anderson 43-yard pass from Joey Harrington (Jason Hanson kick no good), 13:36. Denver 17–16 **Drive: 7 plays, 70 yards, 2:41.**
- DEN – Jason Elam 41-yard field goal, 3:13. Denver 20–16 **Drive: 10 plays, 57 yards, 4:29.**

**Top passers**

- DET – Joey Harrington – 15/33, 149 yards, 2 TD
- DEN – Jake Plummer – 25/34, 277, 2 TD

**Top receivers**

- DET – Charles Rogers – 4 receptions, 62 yards, TD
- DEN – Ashley Lelie – 4 receptions, 76 yards, TD

**Top rushers**

- DET – Shawn Bryson – 13 rushes, 73 yards
- DEN – Jake Plummer – 6 rushes, 40 yards

In Week 4, the Lions traveled to Mile High to face the Denver Broncos. Both teams punted on their opening possession. The Lions began their second drive by converting a third down with a Shawn Bryson run, before a big 28-yard Bryson run brought them into Denver territory. On the next play, Joey Harrington connected with Charles Rogers for a 33-yard touchdown to take the early lead. The Broncos responded with a 9 play, 80-yard drive that ended with a Jake Plummer 29-yard bomb to Ashley Lelie to tie the game at 7 apiece. The Lions went three-and-out before the Broncos scored on a Plummer pass to Shannon Sharpe to take a 14–7 lead. The Lions responded by converting a Jason Hanson 53-yard field goal to bring them within 4. The Broncos were poised to score before Plummer fumbled on Detroit's 13, turning it over to end the first half.

Both teams punted twice before Denver scored on a Jason Elam 37-yard field goal to take the 17–10 lead. The Lions looked to tie it up when Harrington connected with Scotty Anderson who took it 43-yards for the score. However, Hanson missed the extra point, keeping it a one-point game at 17–16. Both teams punted before the Broncos extended the lead with an Elam 41-yard field goal. Four straight incompletions ended the next Lions drive as they fell 16–20.

==== Week 5: at San Francisco 49ers ====
Week 5: Detroit Lions at San Francisco 49ers – Game summary

Quarter	1	2	3	4	Total
Lions	0	10	0	7	**17**
**49ers**	10	7	7	0	**24**

at San Francisco Stadium at Candlestick Point, San Francisco, California

- Date: October 5, 2003
- Game time: 4:15 p.m. EDT/1:15 p.m. PDT
- Game weather: Sunny, 66 °F (18.9 °C)
- Game attendance: 67,365
- Referee: Mike Carey
- Box score

Game information

**First quarter**

- SF – Terrell Owens 6-yard pass from Jeff Garcia (Owen Pochman kick good), 11:39. San Francisco 7–0 **Drive: 6 plays, 23 yards, 2:33.**
- SF – Owen Pochman 48-yard field goal, 4:52. San Francisco 10–0 **Drive: 8 plays, 33 yards, 4:12.**

**Second quarter**

- SF – Aaron Walker 14-yard pass from Jeff Garcia (Owen Pochman kick good), 12:18. San Francisco 17–0 **Drive: 11 plays, 90 yards, 5:54.**
- DET – Jason Hanson 28-yard field goal, 5:57. San Francisco 17–3 **Drive: 8 plays, 76 yards, 3:05.**
- DET – Mikhael Ricks 6-yard pass from Joey Harrington (Jason Hanson kick good), 2:58. San Francisco 17–10 **Drive: 6 plays, 34 yards, 2:52.**

**Third quarter**

- SF – Jeff Garcia 1-yard rush (Owen Pochman kick good), 1:01. San Francisco 24–10 **Drive: 3 plays, 38 yards, 1:23.**

**Fourth quarter**

- DET – Olandis Gary 2-yard rush (Jason Hanson kick good), 11:44. San Francisco 24–17 **Drive: 8 plays, 60 yards, 4:17.**

**Top passers**

- DET – Joey Harrington – 19/35, 200 yards, TD, 2 INT
- SF – Jeff Garcia – 15/27, 192 yards, 2 TD, INT

**Top receivers**

- DET – Mikhael Ricks – 4 receptions, 76 yards, TD
- SF – Terrell Owens – 5 receptions, 79 yards, TD

**Top rushers**

- DET – Olandis Gary – 14 rushes, 64 yards, TD
- SF – Garrison Hearst – 19 rushes, 74 yards

In Week 5, the Lions traveled to San Francisco to face the San Francisco 49ers. On the opening drive of the game, Joey Harrington threw an interception to Ahmed Plummer on the second play. The 49ers capitalized as Jeff Garcia connected with Terrell Owens for the 6-yard score. The Lions couldn't respond and punted on their next drive. The 49ers extended their lead with an Owen Pochman 48-yard field goal. After another Lions punt, Garcia found Aaron Walker for a 14-yard touchdown to go up 17–0. After both teams traded punts, the Lions got on the board with a Jason Hanson 28-yard field goal. After an interception by Dré Bly on the first play of the 49ers next drive, the Lions scored on a Mikhael Ricks 6-yard reception from Joey Harrington to put them within 7 as the half came to a close.

After five straight punts and an interception by Harrington, the 49ers capped off a 3-play scoring drive with a Garcia 1-yard rush. The Lions were able to respond with a scoring drive of their own after Olandis Gary scored on a 2-yard run to bring the Lions within 7 again. After two punts, the 49ers looked to seal the game with a Pochman 37-yard field goal, but he missed it wide left to keep the game within 7 points. The Lions next drive ended with a punt before the 49ers ran the rest of the clock out to seal the final score of 24–17, dropping the Lions to 1–4 and last in the NFC North.

==== Week 7: vs. Dallas Cowboys ====
Week 7: Dallas Cowboys at Detroit Lions – Game summary

Quarter	1	2	3	4	Total
**Cowboys**	7	21	7	3	**38**
Lions	7	0	0	0	**7**

at Ford Field, Detroit, Michigan

- Date: October 19, 2003
- Game time: 1:00 p.m. EDT/12:00 p.m. CDT
- Game weather: None (indoor stadium)
- Game attendance: 61,160
- Referee: Terry McAulay
- Box score

Game information

**First quarter**

- DET – Dré Bly 67-yard fumble return (Jason Hanson kick good), 8:23. Detroit 7–0
- DAL – Terry Glenn 20-yard pass from Quincy Carter (Billy Cundiff kick good), 4:58. Tied 7–7 **Drive: 6 plays, 78 yards, 3:25.**

**Second quarter**

- DAL – Terry Glenn 19-yard pass from Quincy Carter (Billy Cundiff kick good), 11:31. Dallas 14–7 **Drive: 7 plays, 83 yards, 3:18.**
- DAL – Terry Glenn 8-yard pass from Quincy Carter (Billy Cundiff kick good), 10:21. Dallas 21–7 **Drive: 1 play, 8 yards, 0:06.**
- DAL – Mario Edwards 27-yard interception return (Billy Cundiff kick good), 4:20. Dallas 28–7

**Third quarter**

- DAL – Troy Hambrick 3-yard rush (Billy Cundiff kick good), 7:33. Dallas 35–7 **Drive: 14 plays, 81 yards, 7:27.**

**Fourth quarter**

- DAL – Billy Cundiff 23-yard field goal, 14:57. Dallas 38–7 **Drive: 12 plays, 59 yards, 6:35.**

**Top passers**

- DAL – Quincy Carter – 18/25, 190 yards, 3 TD
- DET – Mike McMahon – 5/20, 51 yards, INT

**Top receivers**

- DAL – Terry Glenn – 6 receptions, 75 yards, 3 TD
- DET – Scotty Anderson – 3 receptions, 27 yards

**Top rushers**

- DAL – Troy Hambrick – 24 rushes, 74 yards, TD
- DET – Olandis Gary – 11 rushes, 37 yards

In Week 7 after their bye, the Lions hosted the Dallas Cowboys. The game started with three punts. On the first play from scrimmage after a Lions punt, Dallas running back Troy Hambrick fumbled which was forced by Corey Harris and picked up by Dré Bly and brought back 67 yards for the score. The Cowboys recovered and answered with a Quincy Carter 20-yard pass to Terry Glenn to tie the game at 7 apiece. After a Lions punt, the Cowboys took the lead on another Carter pass to Glenn. After a Joey Harrington interception, the Cowboys took a 21–7 lead with the third straight Carter to Glenn touchdown pass. After trading punts, Harrington was intercepted by Mario Edwards which was brought back 27 yards for a pick-6. After that play, the Lions benched Harrington for Mike McMahon and the half came to a close.

The Cowboys began the second half with a Troy Hambrick 3-yard touchdown run to take a 35–7 lead. After a Lions punt, the Cowboys tacked on to the blowout with a Billy Cundiff 23-yard field goal. No more scoring would be seen as the Lions fell 38–7.

==== Week 8: at Chicago Bears ====
Week 8: Detroit Lions at Chicago Bears – Game summary

Quarter	1	2	3	4	Total
Lions	0	0	8	8	**16**
**Bears**	0	10	14	0	**24**

at Soldier Field, Chicago, Illinois

- Date: October 26, 2003
- Game time: 1:00 p.m. EST/12:00 p.m. CST
- Game weather: Mostly cloudy, 46 °F (7.8 °C)
- Game attendance: 61,428
- Referee: Larry Nemmers
- Box score

Game information

**First quarter** *No scoring plays **Second quarter**

- CHI – Justin Gage 21-yard pass from Chris Chandler (Paul Edinger kick good), 7:22. Chicago 7–0 **Drive: 3 plays, 24 yards, 1:25.**
- CHI – Paul Edinger 37-yard field goal, 0:00. Chicago 10–0 **Drive: 7 plays, 64 yards, 1:03.**

**Third quarter**

- CHI – Jerry Azumah 89-yard kickoff return (Paul Edinger kick good), 14:46. Chicago 17–0
- CHI – Brock Forsey 8-yard rush (Paul Edinger kick good), 5:23. Chicago 24–0 **Drive: 8 plays, 58 yards, 3:37.**
- DET – Reggie Swinton 96-yard kickoff return (Joey Harrington–Az-Zahir Hakim pass good), 5:10. Chicago 24–8

**Fourth quarter**

- DET – Mikhael Ricks 3-yard pass from Joey Harrington (Joey Harrington–Scotty Anderson pass good), 0:53. Chicago 24–16 **Drive: 5 plays, 43 yards, 0:45.**

**Top passers**

- DET – Joey Harrington – 23/40, 180 yards, TD, 2 INT
- CHI – Chris Chandler – 20/31, 207 yards, TD

**Top receivers**

- DET – Scotty Anderson – 4 receptions, 39 yards
- CHI – Justin Gage – 2 receptions, 58 yards, TD

**Top rushers**

- DET – Shawn Bryson – 14 rushes, 67 yards
- CHI – Brock Forsey – 19 rushes, 56 yards, TD

In Week 8, the Lions traveled to Soldier Field to play against division rival Chicago Bears. Both teams punted thrice to start the game before Joey Harrington threw a pick to Charles Tillman on the first play of Detroit's fourth drive. The Bears took advantage of the field position with a Chris Chandler 21-yard touchdown pass to Justin Gage. After three punts, the Bears tacked on a Paul Edinger field goal to take a 10–0 lead going into halftime.

The Bears would receive the ball to start the second half. On the kickoff return, Jerry Azumah returned it 89 yards for the touchdown. The Lions failed to respond when Harrington threw an interception to Azumah. Both teams traded punts before the Bears added to their lead with a Brock Forsey 8-yard rushing touchdown to go up 24–0. The Lions ended the shutout after Reggie Swinton returned the ensuing kickoff 96 yards for the score. They made it a two-score game with a Harrington pass to Az-Zahir Hakim two-point conversion. After two punts, the Bears looked to make it a three-score game with an Edinger 32-yard field goal. On the attempt, James Hall was able to block it to keep the Lions' comeback hopes alive. On the ensuing drive, the Lions were able to get down to the Bears' 3-yard line. On 4th and 2, Harrington was unable to connect with Hakim as they turned it over on downs. The Lions were able to get the ball back with 1:38 left in the game. They marched down the field and scored with a Harrington pass to Mikhael Ricks, and brought it to a one-score game with a Harrington two-point pass to Scotty Anderson. On the onside kick attempt, the kick was recovered by Lions' Bill Schroeder, but the kick did not travel the necessary 10 yards for recovery by the kicking team. This sealed the 24–16 loss for Detroit to fall to 1–6.

==== Week 9: vs. Oakland Raiders ====
Week 9: Oakland Raiders at Detroit Lions – Game summary

Quarter	1	2	3	4	Total
Raiders	0	3	7	3	**13**
**Lions**	10	0	7	6	**23**

at Ford Field, Detroit, Michigan

- Date: November 2, 2003
- Game time: 1:00 p.m. EST/10:00 a.m. PST
- Game weather: None (indoor stadium)
- Game attendance: 61,561
- Referee: Jeff Triplette
- Box score

Game information

**First quarter**

- DET – Jason Hanson 54-yard field goal, 12:54. Detroit 3–0 **Drive: 4 plays, 8 yards, 1:26.**
- DET – Olandis Gary 2-yard run (Jason Hanson kick good), 0:58. Detroit 10–0 **Drive: 4 plays, 12 yards, 1:26.**

**Second quarter**

- OAK – Sebastian Janikowski 55-yard field goal, 0:00. Detroit 10–3 **Drive: 13 plays, 48 yards, 1:51.**

**Third quarter**

- DET – Cory Schlesinger 33-yard pass from Joey Harrington (Jason Hanson kick good), 11:06. Detroit 17–3 **Drive: 7 plays, 66 yards, 3:54.**
- OAK – Charlie Garner 7-yard run (Sebastian Janikowski kick good), 2:55. Detroit 17–10 **Drive: 14 plays, 79 yards, 8:11.**

**Fourth quarter**

- DET – Jason Hanson 42-yard field goal, 12:45. Detroit 20–10 **Drive: 11 plays, 44 yards, 5:10.**
- OAK – Sebastian Janikowski 24-yard field goal, 9:14. Detroit 20–13 **Drive: 4 plays, 3 yards, 0:52.**
- DET – Jason Hanson 39-yard field goal, 5:52. Detroit 23–13 **Drive: 6 plays, 16 yards, 3:22.**

**Top passers**

- OAK – Rick Mirer – 15/28, 125 yards, 2 INT
- DET – Joey Harrington – 13/21, 117 yards, TD, INT

**Top receivers**

- OAK – Jerry Rice – 8 receptions, 71 yards
- DET – Cory Schlesinger – 4 receptions, 53 yards, TD

**Top rushers**

- OAK – Charlie Garner – 15 rushes, 66 yards, TD
- DET – Shawn Bryson – 12 rushes, 53 yards

In Week 9, the Lions hosted the Oakland Raiders. On the opening drive of the game, Raiders quarterback Marques Tuiasosopo threw an interception to Otis Smith. The Lions capitalized with a Jason Hanson 54-yard field goal. The Raiders attempted to mount a response, setting up a 55-yard field goal for kicker Sebastian Janikowski. However, he missed it wide right. The Lions went three-and-out on their next possession, but they got the ball back when Jerry Rice fumbled a pass that was recovered by Barrett Green and brought to Oakland's 12-yard line. The Lions scored with an Olandis Gary 2-yard rushing touchdown. After three punts, Joey Harrington threw an interception. Despite Tuiasosopo being benched for Rick Mirer, the Raiders punted. The Lions punted on their next possession as Janikowski kicked a 55-yard field goal to end the first half 10–3.

The Lions took the second half kickoff and scored with a Harrington 33-yard touchdown pass to Cory Schlesinger to go up 17–3. The Raiders responded with a long 14 play, 79-yard drive that took up half of the third quarter, scoring on a Charlie Garner 7-yard rushing touchdown. The Lions responded with a Hanson 42-yard field goal. The teams traded field goals to reach the final score of 23–13.

==== Week 10: vs. Chicago Bears ====
Week 10: Chicago Bears at Detroit Lions – Game summary

Quarter	1	2	3	4	Total
Bears	0	3	7	0	**10**
**Lions**	3	3	3	3	**12**

at Ford Field, Detroit, Michigan

- Date: November 9, 2003
- Game time: 1:00 p.m. EST/12:00 p.m. CST
- Game weather: None (indoor stadium)
- Game attendance: 61,492
- Referee: Bernie Kukar
- Box score

Game information

**First quarter**

- DET – Jason Hanson 24-yard field goal, 1:53. Detroit 3–0 **Drive: 7 plays, 44 yards, 3:55.**

**Second quarter**

- CHI – Paul Edinger 43-yard field goal, 11:28. Tied 3–3 **Drive: 11 plays, 44 yards, 5:25.**
- DET – Jason Hanson 25-yard field goal, 2:40. Detroit 6–3 **Drive: 11 plays, 55 yards, 5:06.**

**Third quarter**

- CHI – Desmond Clark 12-yard pass from Chris Chandler (Paul Edinger kick good), 7:52. Chicago 10–6 **Drive: 8 plays, 50 yards, 3:55.**
- DET – Jason Hanson 30-yard field goal, 2:49. Chicago 10–9 **Drive: 10 plays, 49 yards, 5:03.**

**Fourth quarter**

- DET – Jason Hanson 48-yard field goal, 0:39. Detroit 12–10 **Drive: 7 plays, 35 yards, 1:48.**

**Top passers**

- CHI – Chris Chandler – 16/28, 149 yards, TD, INT
- DET – Joey Harrington – 24/38, 238 yards

**Top receivers**

- CHI – Desmond Clark – 4 receptions, 39 yards, TD
- DET – Scotty Anderson – 5 receptions, 77 yards

**Top rushers**

- CHI – Anthony Thomas – 21 rushes, 61 yards
- DET – Reggie Swinton – 1 rush, 9 yards

In Week 10, the Lions hosted the Chicago Bears. The teams traded punts before Detroit began their drive at Chicago's side of the field due to a poor punt by Brad Maynard. Detroit capitalized with a Hanson 24-yard field goal to open up the scoring. Chicago responded with an 11-play drive capped off by a Paul Edinger 43-yard field goal to tie it up at 3 apiece. After a Lions fake punt failed to convert, the Bears attempted a 48-yard field goal that was blocked by Jared DeVries to keep the game tied. Harrington led the Lions down the field as they converted on another Hanson field goal to put them up 6–3 at the half.

Both teams traded a punt with Chicago getting the ball at the 50-yard line to start their second drive of the half. The Bears marched down the field and scored on a Chris Chandler pass to Desmond Clark to go up 10–6. The Lions responded with a 10-play drive that ended with a Hanson 30-yard field goal to bring the score within a point. Chicago looked poised to score again on an Edinger 41-yard field goal, but Edinger missed it wide left. Both teams proceeded to punt before the Lions got the ball back with 2:27 left to play. Six straight Harrington passes set up a Hanson 48-yard field goal, which he made to put Detroit up 12–10. On the first play of Chicago's ensuing drive, Chandler threw an interception to Corey Harris that sealed the 12–10 victory for Detroit, who won two straight for the first time since 2000.

==== Week 11: at Seattle Seahawks ====
Week 11: Detroit Lions at Seattle Seahawks – Game summary

Quarter	1	2	3	4	Total
Lions	7	7	0	0	**14**
**Seahawks**	14	21	0	0	**35**

at Seahawks Stadium, Seattle, Washington

- Date: November 16, 2003
- Game time: 4:15 p.m. EST/1:15 p.m. PST
- Game weather: Cloudy, intermittent rain, 46 °F (7.8 °C)
- Game attendance: 65,865
- Referee: Mike Carey
- Box score

Game information

**First quarter**

- SEA – Matt Hasselbeck 4-yard run (Josh Brown kick good), 11:33. Seattle 7–0 **Drive: 8 plays, 80 yards, 3:27.**
- SEA – Shaun Alexander 1-yard run (Josh Brown kick good), 0:52. Seattle 14–0 **Drive: 13 plays, 87 yards, 7:41.**
- DET – Scotty Anderson 72-yard pass from Joey Harrington (Jason Hanson kick good), 0:38. Seattle 14–7 **Drive: 1 play, 72 yards, 0:14.**

**Second quarter**

- SEA – Koren Robinson fumble recovery in endzone (Josh Brown kick good), 11:05. Seattle 21–7 **Drive: 8 plays, 76 yards, 4:33.**
- SEA – Bobby Engram 34-yard pass from Matt Hasselbeck (Josh Brown kick good), 6:38. Seattle 28–7 **Drive: 1 play, 34 yards, 0:07.**
- SEA – Bobby Engram 83-yard punt return (Josh Brown kick good), 3:51. Seattle 35–7.
- DET – Az-Zahir Hakim 15-yard pass from Joey Harrington (Jason Hanson kick good), 0:41. Seattle 35–14 **Drive: 9 plays, 71 yards, 3:10.**

**Top passers**

- DET – Joey Harrington – 26/48, 285 yards, 2 TD, 2 INT
- SEA – Matt Hasselbeck – 21/28, 207 yards, TD

**Top receivers**

- DET – Scotty Anderson – 2 receptions, 87 yards, TD
- SEA – Bobby Engram – 3 receptions, 59 yards, TD

**Top rushers**

- DET – Olandis Gary – 6 rushes, 43 yards
- SEA – Shaun Alexander – 20 rushes, 110 yards, TD

In Week 11, the Lions traveled to Seattle to play the Seattle Seahawks. Seattle won the opening toss, elected to receive, and took the opening drive 80 yards for the Matt Hasselbeck 4-yard rushing touchdown. The Lions failed to respond and punted. On their second drive, the Seahawks drove downfield to score on a Shaun Alexander 1-yard run to go up 14–0. The Lions responded instantly with a Harrington 72-yard bomb to Anderson to bring the score to 14–7 to end the first quarter. The Seahawks extended their lead when Hasselbeck ran to the Lions' 3 before DeVries forced a fumble that was recovered by Seattle's Koren Robinson for the score. After three straight punts, Seattle capitalized on good field position and scored on a Hasselbeck pass to Bobby Engram to extend their lead to 28–7. The Lions failed to get anything going and punted. On the punt return, Engram ran it back 83 yards for the score to go up 35–7. Detroit finally responded on a Harrington pass to Hakim to put the score at 35–14 entering halftime.

After trading punts to start the second half, Detroit lurched downfield and made it to Seattle's 3-yard line on 2nd and 3. However, Harrington threw three straight incompletions to turn the ball over on downs. After a Seattle punt, the Lions once again ran downfield deep into Seattle territory. On fourth and goal from Seattle's 10, Harrington threw an interception to Shawn Springs to turn the ball over once again. After three more punts, Detroit made it into Seattle territory before Harrington turned the ball over on an interception to Reggie Tongue to seal the 14–35 loss.

==== Week 12: at Minnesota Vikings ====
Week 12: Detroit Lions at Minnesota Vikings – Game summary

Quarter	1	2	3	4	Total
Lions	0	0	7	7	**14**
**Vikings**	7	0	0	17	**24**

at Metrodome, Minneapolis, Minnesota

- Date: November 23, 2003
- Game time: 1:00 p.m. EST/12:00 p.m. CST
- Game weather: None (indoor stadium)
- Game attendance: 63,946
- Referee: Peter Morelli
- Box score

Game information

**First quarter**

- MIN – Michael Bennett 25-yard run (Aaron Elling kick good), 7:29. Minnesota 7–0 **Drive: 7 plays, 62 yards, 3:41.**

**Second quarter**

- No scoring plays

**Third quarter**

- DET – Corey Harris 35-yard fumble return (Jason Hanson kick good), 12:11. Tied 7–7

**Fourth quarter**

- MIN – Aaron Elling 24-yard field goal, 2:45. Minnesota 10–7 **Drive: 15 plays, 73 yards, 8:49.**
- MIN – Corey Chavous 32-yard interception return (Aaron Elling kick good), 2:26. Minnesota 17–7
- MIN – Brian Williams 42-yard interception return (Aaron Elling kick good), 2:06. Minnesota 24–7
- DET – Az-Zahir Hakim 5-yard pass from Joey Harrington (Jason Hanson kick good), 0:35. Minnesota 24–14 **Drive: 8 plays, 57 yards, 1:31.**

**Top passers**

- DET – Joey Harrington – 21/41, 167 yards, TD, 4 INT
- MIN – Daunte Culpepper – 20/30, 196 yards, INT

**Top receivers**

- DET – Az-Zahir Hakim – 7 receptions, 61 yards, TD
- MIN – Randy Moss – 5 receptions, 56 yards

**Top rushers**

- DET – Joey Harrington – 2 rushes, 34 yards
- MIN – Michael Bennett – 15 rushes, 73 yards, TD

In Week 12, the Lions traveled to the Metrodome to face the Minnesota Vikings. Both teams punted on their opening possessions before the Vikings scored on a Michael Bennett 25-yard run to put the Vikings up 7–0. The Lions looked poised to respond, marching into Minnesota territory. However, Harrington threw an interception to Brian Williams. The Vikings failed to capitalize as both teams traded punts. Minnesota crossed into Detroit territory before Daunte Culpepper tossed an interception to Brian Walker. The Lions handed it right back to Minnesota with a Harrington interception to Williams. The Vikings failed to capitalize again and punted. The Lions attempted to put points on the board heading into the half, but Hanson missed his first (and only) field goal of the season, a 43-yarder, wide right.

The Lions punted to begin the second half. However, on Minnesota's first drive to start the half, a fumble by Moe Williams landed in the hands of Dre Bly, who ran it back 44 yards before lateraling it to Corey Harris who brought it the remaining 35 yards for the touchdown. After six straight punts, the Vikings orchestrated a 15-play, 73-yard drive capped off by an Aaron Elling 24-yard field goal. On the Lions ensuing drive, an errant Harrington pass intended for Hakim was intercepted by Corey Chavous and brought back 32 yards for the pick-6. On the first play of the Lions next drive, another Harrington pass was intercepted, this time by Williams, and brought back 42 yards for the second pick-6. The Lions scored on a Harrington pass to Hakim to clinch the final score of 24–14.

==== Week 13: vs. Green Bay Packers ====
Week 13: Green Bay Packers at Detroit Lions – Game summary

Quarter	1	2	3	4	Total
Packers	0	7	7	0	**14**
**Lions**	10	3	0	9	**22**

at Ford Field, Detroit, Michigan

- Date: November 27, 2003
- Game time: 12:30 p.m. EST/11:30 a.m. CST
- Game weather: None (indoor stadium)
- Game attendance: 62,123
- Referee: Ron Winter
- Box score

Game information

**First quarter**

- DET – Shawn Bryson 6-yard run (Jason Hanson kick good), 8:05. Detroit 7–0 **Drive: 10 plays, 56 yards, 4:46.**
- DET – Jason Hanson 42-yard field goal, 0:33. Detroit 10–0 **Drive: 8 plays, 64 yards, 4:08.**

**Second quarter**

- GB – Bubba Franks 5-yard pass from Brett Favre (Ryan Longwell kick good), 10:27. Detroit 10–7 **Drive: 8 plays, 84 yards, 5:06.**
- DET – Jason Hanson 28-yard field goal, 2:37. Detroit 13–7 **Drive: 14 plays, 62 yards, 7:50.**

**Third quarter**

- GB – Javon Walker 45-yard pass from Brett Favre (Ryan Longwell kick good), 3:48. Green Bay 14–13 **Drive: 3 plays, 65 yards, 1:22.**

**Fourth quarter**

- DET – Jason Hanson 49-yard field goal, 13:09. Detroit 16–14 **Drive: 4 plays, 0 yards, 1:44.**
- DET – Jason Hanson 46-yard field goal, 9:17. Detroit 19–14 **Drive: 4 plays, 8 yards, 1:33.**
- DET – Jason Hanson 32-yard field goal, 3:34. Detroit 22–14 **Drive: 8 plays, 41 yards, 4:39.**

**Top passers**

- GB – Brett Favre – 23/27, 296 yards, 2 TD, 3 INT
- DET – Joey Harrington – 21/32, 183 yards, INT

**Top receivers**

- GB – Javon Walker – 3 receptions, 93 yards, TD
- DET – Az-Zahir Hakim – 6 receptions, 65 yards

**Top rushers**

- GB – Ahman Green – 13 rushes, 57 yards
- DET – Shawn Bryson – 16 rushes, 50 yards, TD

In Week 13, the Lions hosted the Green Bay Packers on Thanksgiving. The Packers took the opening kickoff nowhere and punted. Detroit opened up the scoring with a Bryson 6-yard touchdown. Green Bay failed to respond and punted and Detroit extended their lead with a Hanson 42-yard field goal. Green Bay responded by driving downfield and scoring on a Favre 5-yard pass to Bubba Franks to put the Packers on the board 10–7. Detroit responded themselves with a 14-play, 62-yard drive culminating in a Hanson 28-yard field goal to give the Lions a 13–7 lead heading into halftime.

Detroit failed to get anything going on the opening drive of the second half and punted. The Packers made it nearly into the redzone before Favre threw an interception to Bly. The Lions failed to capitalize and punted before allowing a 45-yard touchdown pass to Javon Walker to fall behind 14–13. After three straight punts, Walker fumbled on an 18-yard run to give the Lions possession at Green Bay's 31. The Lions failed to move the ball, settling for a Hanson 49-yard field goal to take the lead 16–14. The Packers punted on their next possession, but got the ball back when Harrington threw an interception to Mike McKenzie. The Lions got the ball straight back when Brian Walker strip-sacked Favre, allowing Dan Wilkinson to recover. The Lions stretched their lead with a Hanson 46-yard field goal. On the Packers' responding drive, Favre threw another interception to Bly. The Lions put themselves up 22–14 with another Hanson field goal, this time from 32 yards out. Another Favre interception sealed the 22–14 victory for the Lions.

==== Week 14: vs. San Diego Chargers ====
Week 14: San Diego Chargers at Detroit Lions – Game summary

Quarter	1	2	3	4	Total
Chargers	7	7	0	0	**14**
**Lions**	0	0	0	7	**7**

at Ford Field, Detroit, Michigan

- Date: December 7, 2003
- Game time: 1:00 p.m. EST/10:00 a.m. PST
- Game weather: Cloudy, 29 °F (−1.7 °C)
- Game attendance: 61,544
- Referee: Bill Leavy
- Box score

Game information

**First quarter**

- KC – Tony Gonzalez 27-yard pass from Trent Green (Morten Andersen kick good), 6:54. Kansas City 7–0 **Drive: 10 plays, 80 yards, 4:27.**
- KC – Priest Holmes 14-yard run (Morten Andersen kick good), 2:41. Kansas City 14–0 **Drive: 4 plays, 50 yards, 2:14.**

**Second quarter**

- KC – Priest Holmes 9-yard run (Morten Andersen kick good), 12:08. Kansas City 21–0 **Drive: 9 plays, 65 yards, 4:34.**
- DET – Jason Hanson 29-yard field goal, 3:35. Kansas City 21–3 **Drive: 15 plays, 71 yards, 8:33.**
- KC –

**Third quarter** **Fourth quarter**

**Top passers**

- SD – Doug Flutie – 17/25, 244 yards, 2 TD, INT
- DET – Joey Harrington – 26/46, 208 yards, TD

**Top receivers**

- SD – LaDainian Tomlinson – 9 receptions, 148 yards, 2 TD
- DET – Reggie Swinton – 5 receptions, 54 yards

**Top rushers**

- SD – LaDainian Tomlinson – 25 rushes, 88 yards
- DET – Shawn Bryson – 10 rushes, 28 yards

In Week 14, the Lions hosted the San Diego Chargers. Both teams punted to begin the game, with San Diego opening up the scoring on a Doug Flutie 16-yard pass to LaDainian Tomlinson. After a Detroit punt, San Diego marched downfield before Flutie threw a redzone interception to Terrence Holt. After three punts, Flutie and Tomlinson connected on a 73-yard touchdown pass. After two punts, the Lions went into halftime down 14–0. Six straight punts opened up the second half before Harrington connected with Casey FitzSimmons to get on the board 14–7. After three more punts, the Lions took possession with 1:49 remaining in the game. Harrington was given control of the potential game-winning drive, taking the snap for all eleven plays. On fourth and 16, Harrington found Ricks for a 21-yard gain to cross midfield and end up at San Diego's 33 yard-line. However, Harrington threw three straight incompletions to turn the ball over on downs and solidify the 7–14 loss.

==== Week 15: at Kansas City Chiefs ====
Week 15: Detroit Lions at Kansas City Chiefs – Game summary

Quarter	1	2	3	4	Total
Lions	0	10	7	0	**17**
**Chiefs**	14	14	17	0	**45**

at Arrowhead Stadium, Kansas City, Missouri

- Date: December 14, 2003
- Game time: 1:00 p.m. EST/12:00 p.m. CST
- Game weather: Cloudy, 29 °F (−1.7 °C)
- Game attendance: 77,922
- Referee: Bill Leavy
- Box score

Game information

**First quarter**

- KC – Tony Gonzalez 27-yard pass from Trent Green (Morten Andersen kick good), 6:54. Kansas City 7–0 **Drive: 10 plays, 80 yards, 4:27.**
- KC – Priest Holmes 14-yard run (Morten Andersen kick good), 2:41. Kansas City 14–0 **Drive: 4 plays, 50 yards, 2:14.**

**Second quarter**

- KC – Priest Holmes 9-yard run (Morten Andersen kick good), 12:08. Kansas City 21–0 **Drive: 9 plays, 65 yards, 4:34.**
- DET – Jason Hanson 29-yard field goal, 3:35. Kansas City 21–3 **Drive: 15 plays, 71 yards, 8:33.**
- KC – Derrick Blaylock 63-yard pass from Trent Green (Morten Andersen kick good), 2:11. Kansas City 28–3 **Drive: 3 plays, 70 yards, 1:24.**
- DET – Az-Zahir Hakim 8-yard pass from Joey Harrington (Jason Hanson kick good), 0:18. Kansas City 28–10 **Drive: 11 plays, 57 yards, 1:53.**

**Third quarter**

- KC – Priest Holmes 3-yard run (Morten Andersen kick good), 10:30. Kansas City 35–10 **Drive: 9 plays, 46 yards, 4:30.**
- KC – Morten Andersen 35-yard field goal, 6:56. Kansas City 38–10 **Drive: 7 plays, 36 yards, 3:26.**
- DET – Shawn Bryson 1-yard rush (Jason Hanson kick good), 3:54. Kansas City 38–17 **Drive: 6 plays, 53 yards, 3:02.**
- KC – Tony Gonzalez 9-yard pass from Trent Green (Morten Andersen kick good), 1:02. Kansas City 45–17 **Drive: 6 plays, 77 yards, 2:52.**

**Fourth quarter**

- No scoring plays

**Top passers**

- DET – Joey Harrington – 20/36, 197 yards, TD, INT
- KC – Trent Green – 20/25, 341 yards, 3 TD

**Top receivers**

- DET – Az-Zahir Hakim – 6 receptions, 72 yards, TD
- KC – Derrick Blaylock – 5 receptions, 106 yards, TD

**Top rushers**

- DET – Shawn Bryson – 18 rushes, 105 yards, TD
- KC – Priest Holmes – 18 rushes, 94 yards, 3 TD

In Week 15, the Lions traveled to Arrowhead to face the Kansas City Chiefs. The Lions took the opening drive into Kansas City territory, but were stopped and forced to punt. Kansas City took their first drive 80 yards capped off by a Trent Green 27-yard pass to Tony Gonzalez for the early 7–0 lead. On the Lions' ensuing drive, Harrington threw an interception to Kawika Mitchell. The Chiefs capitalized with a Priest Holmes 14-yard rushing touchdown. After a Lions punt, the Chiefs extended their lead with another Holmes rushing touchdown to go up 21–0. The Lions responded with a 15-play, 71-yard drive ending with a Hanson 29-yard field goal. The Chiefs extended their lead with a Green 63-yard pass to Derrick Blaylock to go up 28–3. The Lions responded with a Harrington 8-yard pass to Hakim, bringing the halftime score to 28–10 after a Morten Andersen missed 48-yard field goal.

The Chiefs took the second half opening drive 46 yards for the score on a Holmes 3-yard run to extend their lead to 35–10. On the ensuing kickoff, Reggie Swinton fumbled the return, giving the ball to the Chiefs on their own 47-yard line. The Chiefs capitalized with a 35-yard field goal. The Lions quickly scored with a Shawn Bryson 1-yard run. The Chiefs tacked on another touchdown when Green connected with Gonzalez to bring the score to 45–17. The Lions last two possessions ended with a turnover on downs, sealing the 45–17 loss. With the loss, the Lions tied the Houston Oilers NFL-record of 23 straight road losses.

==== Week 16: at Carolina Panthers ====
Week 16: Detroit Lions at Carolina Panthers – Game summary

Quarter	1	2	3	4	Total
Lions	0	0	0	14	**14**
**Panthers**	7	10	3	0	**20**

at Ericsson Stadium, Charlotte, North Carolina

- Date: December 21, 2003
- Game time: 1:00 p.m. EST
- Game weather: Sunny, 42 °F (5.6 °C)
- Game attendance: 72,835
- Referee: Terry McAulay
- Box score

Game information

**First quarter**

- CAR – Steve Smith Sr. 20-yard pass from Jake Delhomme (John Kasay kick good), 10:30. Carolina 7–0 **Drive: 5 plays, 51 yards, 2:34.**

**Second quarter**

- CAR – DeShaun Foster 10-yard pass from Jake Delhomme (John Kasay kick good), 8:03. Carolina 14–0 **Drive: 9 plays, 84 yards, 5:23.**
- CAR – John Kasay 42-yard field goal, 1:54. Carolina 17–0 **Drive: 5 plays, 32 yards, 2:10.**

**Third quarter**

- CAR – John Kasay 44-yard field goal, 7:53. Carolina 20–0 **Drive: 12 plays, 51 yards, 7:07.**

**Fourth quarter**

- DET – Reggie Swinton 89-yard punt return (Jason Hanson kick good), 12:02. Carolina 20–7
- DET – Boss Bailey 62-yard defensive fumble return (Jason Hanson kick good), 3:44. Carolina 20–14

**Top passers**

- DET – Mike McMahon – 4/11, 36 yards, INT
- CAR – Jake Delhomme – 29/35, 260 yards, 2 TD, INT

**Top receivers**

- DET – David Kircus – 1 reception, 18 yards
- CAR – Steve Smith Sr. – 5 receptions, 81 yards, TD

**Top rushers**

- DET – Artose Pinner – 12 rushes, 22 yards
- CAR – DeShaun Foster – 21 rushes, 76 yards

In Week 16, the Lions traveled to Ericsson Stadium to face the eventual NFC-champion Carolina Panthers. The Lions punted on their first possession before the Panthers scored on a Steve Smith Sr. 20-yard pass from Jake Delhomme to take the early 7–0 lead. After three punts, the Lions got a takeaway when Delhomme threw an interception to Terrance Holt. But they couldn't capitalize, and punted. Carolina took their next possession 84 yards for the score, capped off by a Delhomme 10-yard pass to DeShaun Foster. After a Harrington redzone interception, Carolina scored on a John Kasay 42-yard field goal to take the 17–0 lead going into halftime.

The Panthers extended their lead on the opening drive of the second half with a Kasay 44-yard field goal. After two punts and a turnover on downs going into the fourth quarter, Detroit finally scored with a Swinton 89-yard punt return touchdown. After two more punts, Carolina moved into Detroit territory at the 40-yard line. A Foster reception from Delhomme was forced out by Bly and recovered by Boss Bailey for the 62-yard fumble return touchdown. Down one score with 3:38 left in the game, Detroit allowed Carolina to convert two third-downs to seal their 14–20 loss. With the loss, Detroit broke an NFL record for the most consecutive road losses with 24, having not won a road game since Week 16 of the 2000 season.

==== Week 17: vs. St. Louis Rams ====
Week 17: St. Louis Rams at Detroit Lions – Game summary

Quarter	1	2	3	4	Total
Rams	0	20	0	0	**20**
**Lions**	3	7	17	3	**30**

at Ford Field, Detroit, Michigan

- Date: December 28, 2003
- Game time: 1:00 p.m. EST
- Game weather: None (indoor stadium)
- Game attendance: 61,006
- Referee: Johnny Grier
- Box score

Game information

**First quarter**

- DET – Jason Hanson 39-yard field goal, 2:59. Detroit 3–0 **Drive: 13 plays, 53 yards, 7:06.**

**Second quarter**

- STL – Brandon Manumaleuna 8-yard pass from Marc Bulger (Jeff Wilkins kick good), 14:52. St. Louis 7–3 **Drive: 7 plays, 69 yards, 3:07.**
- DET – Bill Schroeder 13-yard pass from Joey Harrington (Jason Hanson kick good), 11:50. Detroit 10–7 **Drive: 6 plays, 64 yards, 3:02.**
- STL – Jeff Wilkins 51-yard field goal, 6:06. Tied 10–10 **Drive: 12 plays, 39 yards, 5:44.**
- STL – Marshall Faulk 2-yard rush (Jeff Wilkins kick good), 3:37. St. Louis 17–10 **Drive: 2 plays, 5 yards, 0:45.**
- STL – Jeff Wilkins 36-yard field goal, 0:23. St. Louis 20–10 **Drive: 8 plays, 34 yards, 1:28.**

**Third quarter**

- DET – Az-Zahir Hakim 13-yard pass from Joey Harrington (Jason Hanson kick good), 11:43. St. Louis 20–17 **Drive: 3 plays, 24 yards, 1:50.**
- DET – Casey FitzSimmons 2-yard pass from Joey Harrington (Jason Hanson kick good), 5:30. Detroit 24–20 **Drive: 8 plays, 51 yards, 3:53.**
- DET – Jason Hanson 38-yard field goal, 2:56. Detroit 27–20 **Drive: 4 plays, 8 yards, 1:25.**

**Fourth quarter**

- DET – Jason Hanson 50-yard field goal, 14:29. Detroit 30–20 **Drive: 6 plays, 14 yards, 2:12.**

**Top passers**

- STL – Marc Bulger – 18/31, 170 yards, TD, INT
- DET – Joey Harrington – 26/36, 238 yards, 3 TD, INT

**Top receivers**

- STL – Torry Holt – 5 receptions, 54 yards
- DET – Az-Zahir Hakim – 5 receptions, 58 yards, TD

**Top rushers**

- STL – Marshall Faulk – 12 rushes, 35 yards, TD
- DET – Artose Pinner – 18 rushes, 51 yards

In Week 17, the Lions hosted the heavily favored St. Louis Rams in Detroit's final game of the season. After trading punts, the Lions opened up the scoring with a Hanson 39-yard field goal. The Rams responded with a Brandon Manumaleuna 8-yard pass from Marc Bulger. The Lions themselves responded with a Harrington 13-yard touchdown pass to Schroeder to go up 10–7. St. Louis marched down the field on a 12-play, 39-yard drive that ended with a Jeff Wilkins 51-yard field goal to tie it at 10 apiece. After going three-and-out, Detroit's punt was blocked by Erik Flowers and went out of bounds at Detroit's five. With the great field position, St. Louis punched it in with a Marshall Faulk 2-yard run to go up 17–10. The Lions turned the ball over once again when a Harrington pass to Hakim was forced out by Pisa Tinoisamoa and recovered by safety Aeneas Williams at the Rams 48. The Lions defensive line batted two Bulger passes to force the Rams to settle for a Wilkins 36-yard field goal, which he made to put the score at 20–10 entering halftime.

The Rams got the ball to begin the second half, but fumbled it away when Shaun Rogers strip-sacked Bulger. The Lions capitalized on a Harrington 13-yard touchdown pass to Hakim to pull within three points. The Rams were forced to punt on a three-and-out before the Lions took the lead on a FitzSimmons 2-yard pass from Harrington to go up 24–20. On the responding drive, Bulger was intercepted by Boss Bailey who lateralled it to Bly to bring it to the Rams 28. Detroit extended their lead to 27–20 with a Hanson 38-yard field goal. After forcing another St. Louis punt, Detroit went up two scores with a Hanson 50-yarder. Detroit strip-sacked Bulger again before another Harrington interception gave it right back to the Rams. Concerned about the hits Bulger was taking, Bulger was benched and the Rams brought in Kurt Warner. Despite the change at quarterback, the Rams punted on their next drive, as did the Lions. With possession of the ball with 4:40 left in the game, Warner couldn't lead the Rams into Detroit territory and turned the ball over on downs to seal the 30–20 upset win for the Lions, forcing the Rams out of the #1 seed.

=== Standings ===
NFC North
	W	L	T	PCT	DIV	CONF	PF	PA	STK
^{(4)} Green Bay Packers	10	6	0	.625	4–2	7–5	442	307	W4
Minnesota Vikings	9	7	0	.563	4–2	7–5	416	353	L1
Chicago Bears	7	9	0	.438	2–4	4–8	283	346	L1
Detroit Lions	5	11	0	.313	2–4	4–8	270	379	W1

NFC
#	Team	Division	W	L	T	PCT	DIV	CONF	SOS	SOV	STK
**Division leaders**
1 (Note: Philadelphia was #1 NFC seed ahead of St. Louis based upon better conference record.)	Philadelphia Eagles	East	12	4	0	.750	5–1	9–3	.477	.438	W1
2	St. Louis Rams	West	12	4	0	.750	4–2	8–4	.434	.443	L1
3	Carolina Panthers	South	11	5	0	.688	5–1	9–3	.445	.398	W3
4	Green Bay Packers	North	10	6	0	.625	4–2	7–5	.488	.438	W4
**Wild cards**
5 (Note: Seattle was #5 NFC seed ahead of Dallas based upon strength of victory.)	Seattle Seahawks	West	10	6	0	.625	5–1	8–4	.465	.406	W2
6	Dallas Cowboys	East	10	6	0	.625	5–1	8–4	.461	.388	L1
**Did not qualify for the postseason**
7	Minnesota Vikings	North	9	7	0	.563	4–2	7–5	.457	.500	L1
8	New Orleans Saints	South	8	8	0	.500	3–3	7–5	.500	.375	W1
9 (Note: San Francisco finished ahead of Tampa Bay based upon head-to-head victory. Conference record tiebreak was used to eliminate Chicago.) (Note: San Francisco and Tampa Bay finished ahead of Chicago by virtue of better conference record.)	San Francisco 49ers	West	7	9	0	.438	2–4	6–6	.512	.473	L1
10	Tampa Bay Buccaneers	South	7	9	0	.438	2–4	6–6	.508	.438	L2
11	Chicago Bears	North	7	9	0	.438	2–4	4–8	.488	.366	L1
12 (Note: Atlanta finished ahead of Detroit based upon better win percentage against common opponents (Atlanta were 2–3 against Detroit’s 1–4 versus St. Louis, Carolina, Dallas and Minnesota). Conference record tiebreak was used to eliminate Washington.) (Note: Atlanta and Detroit finished ahead of Washington by virtue of better conference record.)	Atlanta Falcons	South	5	11	0	.313	2–4	4–8	.539	.463	W2
13	Detroit Lions	North	5	11	0	.313	2–4	4–8	.535	.463	W1
14	Washington Redskins	East	5	11	0	.313	1–5	3–9	.531	.488	L3
15 (Note: New York Giants finished ahead of Arizona based upon better win percentage against common opponents (New York Giants were 2–3 against Arizona’s 1–4 versus St. Louis, Carolina, Dallas and Minnesota).)	New York Giants	East	4	12	0	.250	1–5	3–9	.555	.500	L8
16	Arizona Cardinals	West	4	12	0	.250	1–5	3–9	.543	.531	W1
**Tiebreakers** (Note: When breaking ties for three or more teams under the NFL's rules, they are first broken within divisions, then comparing only the highest-ranked remaining team from each division.)
