= Eddie Drummond =

American football player (born 1980)

No. 18, 85
- Position: Wide receiver / Return specialist

Personal information
- Born: April 12, 1980 (age 46); Pittsburgh, Pennsylvania, U.S.
- Listed height: 5 ft 9 in (1.75 m)
- Listed weight: 190 lb (86 kg)

Career information
- High school: Linsly School (Wheeling, West Virginia)
- College: Penn State
- NFL draft: 2002: undrafted

Career history
- Detroit Lions (2002–2006); Kansas City Chiefs (2007); Pittsburgh Steelers (2008)*; Las Vegas Locomotives (2011)
- * Offseason or practice squad member only

Awards and highlights
- First-team All-Pro (2004); Pro Bowl (2004)

Career NFL statistics
- Receptions: 4
- Receiving yards: 7
- Return yards: 7,091
- Total touchdowns: 6
- Stats at Pro Football Reference

Edward Matthew Drummond (born April 12, 1980) is an American former professional football player who was a wide receiver and return specialist in the National Football League (NFL). He played college football for the Penn State Nittany Lions and was signed by the Detroit Lions as an undrafted free agent in 2002.

A Pro Bowl selection with the Lions in 2004, Drummond was also a member of the Kansas City Chiefs, Pittsburgh Steelers and Las Vegas Locomotives.

== Early life ==
Drummond was born on April 12, 1980 in the Pittsburgh area. He attended middle school at Rogers Middle School in Pittsburgh. Though his family lived in the Larmier area, his mother was worried about the gang violence in the area, and looked to move Drummond into a private school. His mother put him in The Linsly School in Wheeling, West Virginia, a former military institute turned into a boarding school.

In high school, Drummond competed in two sports: track and football. In track, Drummond ran 100 metres in 10.52 seconds and ran the 40-yard dash in 4.3 seconds. Going into his senior year of high school, he was ranked as the No. 2 running back in the country. In his high school career, Drummond finished with 5,729 all-purpose yards and 70 touchdowns. His 3,901 rushing yards and 55 rushing touchdowns were all school records.

== College career ==
Drummond received offers from Florida State, Michigan, Michigan State, Notre Dame, Ohio State, Penn State, West Virginia, and Wisconsin. He narrowed his decision down between Florida State, Michigan, Penn State and Notre Dame, eventually choosing the Nittany Lions. Although recruited by Joe Paterno as a running back, Drummond would spend his time at Pennsylvania State University switching between tailback and wide receiver. He finished his collegiate career with 71 receptions for 1,132 yards and five touchdowns and rushed the ball 40 times for 272 yards and one touchdown. He caught the attention of pro scouts when he finished the 2001 Blue–Gray Football Classic as the second leading rusher with 26 yards rushing on eight carries.

== Professional career ==
=== Detroit Lions ===
Drummond went undrafted in the 2002 NFL draft. On April 27, 2002, Drummond was signed by the Detroit Lions as an undrafted free agent. In the preseason, Drummond was competing against Desmond Howard and Larry Foster for the return job. He would win the backup role behind Howard, and made it on the 53-man roster. After Howard went down with a neck injury, Drummond became the starting return man in the Lions Week 3 matchup versus the Green Bay Packers. He returned the first kickoff return in Ford Field history, as the stadium opened up less than a month prior. Later in the game, Drummond would assist in a trick play where receiver Az-Zahir Hakim went 72 yards for a punt return touchdown.

=== Kansas City Chiefs ===
Drummond played in 12 games for the Kansas City Chiefs throughout the 2007 season.

=== Pittsburgh Steelers ===
On July 31, 2008, Drummond was signed by the Pittsburgh Steelers. A Steelers fan while growing up, Drummond stated his desire to end his career in Pittsburgh. He was released on August 30 during final cuts.

=== Las Vegas Locomotives ===
On June 13, 2011, Drummond signed with the Las Vegas Locomotives of the United Football League (UFL).

== Career statistics ==
=== NFL ===
Legend
| | Led the league |
| **Bold** | Career high |

| Year | Team | GS | GP | Punt returns | | | | | Kickoff returns | | | | |
| Year | Team | GS | GP | Ret. | Yds | PRTD | Lng | Y/Ret | Ret. | Yds | KRTD | Lng | Y/Ret |
|---|---|---|---|---|---|---|---|---|---|---|---|---|---|
| 2002 | DET | 9 | 0 | 18 | 138 | 1 | 73 | 7.7 | 40 | 1,039 | 0 | 91 | 26.0 |
| 2003 | DET | 6 | 0 | 12 | 151 | 1 | 57 | 12.6 | 21 | 469 | 0 | 38 | 22.3 |
| 2004 | DET | 11 | **1** | 24 | **316** | **2** | **83** | **13.2** | 41 | 1,092 | **2** | **99** | **26.6** |
| 2005 | DET | 12 | 0 | 26 | 157 | 0 | 38 | 6.0 | 49 | 1,077 | 0 | 48 | 22.0 |
| 2006 | DET | **14** | 0 | 28 | 296 | 0 | 40 | 10.6 | **62** | **1,349** | 0 | 65 | 21.8 |
| 2007 | KAN | 12 | 0 | **32** | 222 | 0 | 22 | 6.9 | 37 | 785 | 0 | 39 | 21.2 |
| Total | | 64 | 1 | 140 | 1,280 | 4 | 83 | 9.1 | 250 | 5,811 | 2 | 99 | 23.2 |

=== College ===
| Year | Team | GP | Receiving | | | | Rushing | | | |
| Year | Team | GP | Rec | Yds | Avg | TD | Att | Yds | Avg | TD |
|---|---|---|---|---|---|---|---|---|---|---|
| 1998 | Penn State | 8 | 1 | 12 | 12.0 | 0 | 0 | 0 | 0.0 | 0 |
| 1999 | Penn State | **12** | **35** | **652** | **18.6** | **5** | 5 | 118 | **23.6** | **1** |
| 2000 | Penn State | 10 | 29 | 365 | 12.6 | 0 | 2 | -2 | -1.0 | 0 |
| 2001 | Penn State | 11 | 6 | 103 | 17.2 | 0 | **33** | **156** | 4.7 | 0 |
| Total | | 41 | 71 | 1,132 | 15.9 | 5 | 40 | 272 | 6.8 | 1 |
