= Shaun Rogers (American football) =

American football player (born 1979)

No. 92, 95
- Position: Defensive tackle

Personal information
- Born: March 12, 1979 (age 47); Houston, Texas, U.S.
- Listed height: 6 ft 4 in (1.93 m)
- Listed weight: 350 lb (159 kg)

Career information
- High school: La Porte (La Porte, Texas)
- College: Texas
- NFL draft: 2001: 2nd round, 61st overall pick

Career history
- Detroit Lions (2001–2007); Cleveland Browns (2008–2010); New Orleans Saints (2011); New York Giants (2012–2013)

Awards and highlights
- Second-team All-Pro (2004); 3× Pro Bowl (2004, 2005, 2008); PFWA All-Rookie Team (2001); First-team All-Big 12 (1999)

Career NFL statistics
- Total tackles: 514
- Sacks: 37.5
- Forced fumbles: 6
- Fumble recoveries: 9
- Interceptions: 2
- Defensive touchdowns: 2
- Stats at Pro Football Reference

Shaun Christopher O. Rogers (born March 12, 1979), nicknamed "Big Baby", is an American former professional football player who was a defensive tackle in the National Football League (NFL). He played college football for the Texas Longhorns. He was selected by the Detroit Lions in the second round of the 2001 NFL draft with the 61st overall pick. Rogers has also played for the Cleveland Browns and New Orleans Saints. Running back Adrian Peterson considered Rogers one of the hardest-hitting players in the NFL.

== Early life ==
At La Porte High School in La Porte, Texas, Rogers was a two-way tackle, and also lettered in basketball. He is known for his athleticism, ability to rush the quarterback, and also his ability to stop the run. He was also known to play running back near the goal line. He had 17 attempts for 135 yards. His nickname in the locker room was Chunks.

== College career ==
Shaun Rogers played for the University of Texas, pairing with nose tackle Casey Hampton, and ranked third on the school's career-record list with 53 stops behind the line of scrimmage. He collected 199 tackles (108 solo) with 14 sacks and 54 pressures during his career. In 2000, he was named to the AP Honorable Mention All-Big 12 Team. That year, he played in nine games, starting six contests at right defensive tackle. He helped the Longhorns lead the nation in pass efficiency defense and rank seventh in total defense. He recorded 44 tackles (24 solos) with 3.5 sacks for minus 31 yards and 27 stops for losses of 56 yards.

== Professional career ==
=== 2001 NFL draft ===
Pre-draft measurables
Height	Weight	40-yard dash
6 ft 4 1/2 in (1.94 m)	320 lb (145 kg)	5.30 s
All values from NFL Combine

Prior to the draft, Rogers recorded a 5.3 sec 40-yard dash while weighing 320 pounds (145 kg). Rogers was selected by the Detroit Lions in the second round (61st overall) in the 2001 NFL draft.

=== Detroit Lions ===
In his rookie season, he recorded 90 tackles (68 solo), 3 sacks, 1 forced fumble, and 4 pass deflections in 16 starts. In 2002, Rogers finished with 48 tackles (26 solo), 2.5 sacks, and 2 pass deflections in 14 games. In 2003, he started in all 16 games and finished the season with 58 tackles (42 solo), 4 sacks, 1 forced fumble, and 5 pass deflections. His 2004 season was nearly identical to the previous one, as he again started in all 16 games and posted 68 tackles (48 solo), 4 sacks, and 5 pass deflections. He was selected as a Pro Bowl starter and was named an AP 2nd Team All-Pro. In 2005, Rogers recorded 39 tackles (29 solo), 5.5 sacks, 2 forced fumbles, and 2 pass deflections in 14 games and was selected as a Pro Bowl starter for the second straight year.

On October 18, 2006, Rogers was suspended four games for violating the NFL's substance abuse policy. His agent has stated that Rogers' appetite suppressant medication was the reason for his positive test, but that appealing would not help the situation. Rogers played in only 6 games during the 2006 season and finished with 20 tackles (19 solo) and 3 sacks.

On November 4, 2007, Rogers intercepted a pass from Denver Broncos quarterback Patrick Ramsey and returned it 66 yards for a touchdown. Rogers recorded 39 tackles (26 solo), 7 sacks, 1 interception, and 3 pass deflection in 16 games during the 2007 season.

=== Cleveland Browns ===
On February 29, 2008, Rogers was traded to the Cleveland Browns in exchange for Leigh Bodden and 2008 3rd round pick Andre Fluellen. The Browns ran a 3-4 defense, as opposed to the 4-3 defense Rogers played in for Detroit, and Rogers became the Browns' 3-4 nose tackle. In 2008, Rogers finished with 76 tackles (61 solo), 4.5 sacks, and 4 pass deflections in 16 games and was selected as a Pro Bowl reserve. On November 30, 2009, Rogers was placed on Injured Reserve due to a broken leg. He finished the 2009 season with 36 tackles (27 solo), 2 sacks, and 1 pass deflection. During the 2010 offseason, Rogers was involved in trade rumors, but the Browns ultimately decided to keep him and move him to 3-4 defensive end, which was believed to better suit his skills than the nose tackle position. On February 9, 2011, Rogers was released by the Browns.

=== New Orleans Saints ===
On March 1, 2011, the Saints signed Rogers to a one-year contract worth $4 million. It has been reported that he was offered $6 million to play elsewhere, but ultimately decided to play for the Saints to be closer to his family. Rogers decided not to resign to Saints after on ed year.

=== New York Giants ===
On April 26, 2012, the New York Giants signed Rogers to a contract. Due to a blood clot in his left calf, the team announced that Rogers would miss the entirety of the 2012-13 NFL season. However, after receiving a more encouraging second opinion on the injury, Giants coach Tom Coughlin maintained a "ray of hope" that Rogers could return before the season's end.

On August 31, 2012, Rogers was placed on season-ending injured reserve due to the clot. Then, the Giants re-signed Rogers on February 7, 2013.

== NFL career statistics ==
Year	Team	GP	Tackles				Fumbles			Interceptions					
Year	Team	GP	Cmb	Solo	Ast	Sck	FF	FR	Yds	Int	Yds	Avg	Lng	TD	PD
2001	DET	16	81	60	21	3.0	1	0	0	0	0	0.0	0	0	4
2002	DET	14	48	26	22	2.5	0	2	0	0	0	0.0	0	0	2
2003	DET	16	58	42	16	4.0	1	0	0	0	0	0.0	0	0	5
2004	DET	16	68	48	20	4.0	0	1	0	0	0	0.0	0	0	5
2005	DET	14	39	29	10	5.5	2	1	0	0	0	0.0	0	0	2
2006	DET	6	20	19	1	3.0	0	1	0	0	0	0.0	0	0	0
2007	DET	16	39	26	13	7.0	0	3	0	1	66	66.0	66	1	3
2008	CLE	16	76	61	15	4.5	0	0	0	0	0	0.0	0	0	4
2009	CLE	11	36	27	9	2.0	0	0	0	0	0	0.0	0	0	1
2010	CLE	15	17	14	3	2.0	0	0	0	0	0	0.0	0	0	0
2011	NO	16	22	14	8	0.0	0	0	0	0	0	0.0	0	0	1
2013	NYG	7	9	7	2	0.0	0	0	0	0	0	0.0	0	0	0
Career		163	513	373	140	37.5	4	8	0	1	66	66.0	66	1	27

== Personal life ==
In June 2007, Rogers was accused of sexually assaulting an exotic dancer. Charges were never filed due to lack of evidence.

On April 1, 2010, Rogers was arrested at Cleveland Hopkins Airport for having a loaded gun in his carry on luggage. The NFL fined Rodgers $400,000 for the incident.
