= Reggie Swinton =

American football player (born 1975)

No. 10, 80, 87, 88, 84
- Positions: Wide receiver, return specialist

Personal information
- Born: July 24, 1975 (age 51); Little Rock, Arkansas, U.S.
- Listed height: 6 ft 0 in (1.83 m)
- Listed weight: 186 lb (84 kg)

Career information
- High school: Little Rock Central
- College: Murray State
- NFL draft: 1998: undrafted

Career history
- Jacksonville Jaguars (1998)*; Toronto Argonauts (1999)*; Winnipeg Blue Bombers (1999); Edmonton Eskimos (1999); Seattle Seahawks (2000)*; Las Vegas Outlaws (2001)*; Arkansas Twisters (2001); Dallas Cowboys (2001–2003); Green Bay Packers (2003); Detroit Lions (2003–2004); Houston Texans (2005)*; Arizona Cardinals (2005)
- * Offseason or practice squad member only

Awards and highlights
- Second-team Division I-AA All-American (1996); All-OVC (1996)

Career NFL statistics
- Receptions: 41
- Receiving yards: 493
- Receiving touchdowns: 2
- Return yards: 6,230
- Return touchdowns: 4
- Stats at Pro Football Reference

Reginald Terrell Swinton (born August 24, 1975) is an American former professional football player who was a wide receiver and return specialist in the National Football League (NFL) for the Dallas Cowboys, Detroit Lions and Arizona Cardinals. He played college football for the Murray State Racers.

== Early life ==
Swinton attended Central High School and received All-State honors in football, basketball, baseball and track.

He accepted a football scholarship from Murray State University to play under head coach Houston Nutt.

As a junior in 1996, he became the first Murray State player to amass more than 1,000 receiving yards in a season (1,042), while being selected All-Ohio Valley Conference and second-team Division I-AA All-American. He also posted 66 receptions (led the team) and 8 receiving touchdowns (tied for the team lead). He contributed to the team winning back-to-back Ohio Valley Conference Championships and advancing to quarterfinals of the NCAA Division I-AA playoffs. He registered 10 receptions for 224 receiving yards (second in school history) and 3 touchdowns (tied school record) against Southern Illinois University. He set a school record with four 100-yard receiving games.

As a senior in 1997, head coach Nutt resigned after accepting the same job at Boise State University. It was later reported that Swinton fell out of favor with the coaching staff. He led the team with 35 receptions for 642 yards and 7 receiving touchdowns. He set a school record with an 80-yard reception against Austin Peay State University.

From 1994 to 1997, he established the school records for career receptions (144), career receiving yards (2,346), career receiving touchdowns (20) and 100-yard receiving games (7).

== Professional career ==
Swinton was signed as an undrafted free agent by the Jacksonville Jaguars after the 1998 NFL draft on April 23. He was waived on August 25.

His pro career began in February 1999 in the Canadian Football League (CFL) with the Toronto Argonauts, who in March traded him along with quarterback Kerwin Bell to the Winnipeg Blue Bombers in exchange for Eric Blount, wide receiver Mitch Running and two players on the team's negotiation list. The Blue Bombers signed him on July 13, only to be released on August 2. He was re-signed on August 9 and cut again on August 16. During his time with the team he ranked 10th in the CFL in kickoff returns with a 25.8-yard average and one touchdown. On September 13, 1999, he signed with the Edmonton Eskimos of the CFL, but was released on October 12.

On February 25, 2000, he was signed as a free agent by the Seattle Seahawks, but was cut before the start of the season on August 27.

In 2001, he was selected by the Las Vegas Outlaws in the 2001 XFL draft and was cut on January 29 before the start of the season. He resurfaced that same year with the Arkansas Twisters of the AF2, who initially released him before the stat of the season, only to re-sign him after the fourth game . Swinton led the team and set franchise records with 85 receptions for 1,463 yards, 33 touchdowns and 22 points in 13 games, while also setting the club single-game receiving record (174 yards).

His offensive coordinator with the Twisters (Ron Calcagni) recommended him to the Dallas Cowboys, who in turn would sign him on August 6, 2001. Swinton made the team and set single-season club records for kickoff returns (56), kickoff return yards (1,327), and combined kick return yards (1,741). His 13.7-yard average on punt returns ranked third in the NFL and second in the NFC, and his 23.7-yard average on kickoff returns was ninth in the NFL and seventh in the NFC. Even though he was not given punt return duties until week 7, his 414 punt return yards were the seventh most in club history and tied the mark combined kick returns (87). This production earned him second-team All-Pro honors from College and Pro Football Newsweekly as a punt returner.

In 2002, after missing the first two games with a hamstring strain, against the Philadelphia Eagles he broke the franchise record with 231 kickoff return yards in a game and ranked third in team history with 215 combined return yards. His 24.9-yard average on kickoff returns (including a touchdown) ranked tenth in the NFL. He averaged 7.4 yards on punt returns.

On September 29, 2003, he was traded to the Green Bay Packers in exchange for a conditional seventh-round draft pick, in order to groom rookie Zuriel Smith for the returner role. After being declared inactive for a week-5 game, he was cut on September 9, 2003.

On October 10, 2003, Swinton was claimed off waivers by the Detroit Lions, to replace Eddie Drummond who suffered a sprained knee and ankle against the Minnesota Vikings. He finished the season averaging 13.8 yards on punt returns, fourth-best in the NFL. He also was one of only two players in the league (with Kansas City's Dante Hall) to have both a kickoff and punt return for a touchdown that season.

On September 5, 2004, he was released by the Lions, but was re-signed on September 20 after Drummond was lost for the season with a shoulder injury. In 2004, he averaged 22.8 yards on kickoff returns and 6.5 yards on punt returns, and had his best year as a receiver, catching 18 passes for 410 yards.

On April 18, 2005, he signed as a free agent with the Houston Texans and was waived on September 3. On September 5, he was signed by the Arizona Cardinals, where as the team's primary kick returner he averaged 23.1 yards on kickoff returns and 8.0 yards on punt returns, after a hamstring and toe injury limited him during the season. He wasn't re-signed at the end of the year.

Swinton finished with four career NFL kick returns for touchdowns: two on punt returns and two on kickoff returns.

== Personal life ==
On September 17, 2012, he was named Amateur Athletic Union (AAU) Football Sports Director of Arkansas. In 2022, Swinton was inducted into the Kentucky Pro Football Hall of Fame.

Swinton has a blended family and is married to Patricia Walker-Swinton. They have four children: Craig Steele (CJ), Sydney Steele, Ryan Swinton, and Reggie Swinton, II. His father and uncle were selected in the Major League Baseball draft. In 2002, he released a rap CD entitled "Whatcha gone do?".
