= James Davis (linebacker) =

American football player (born 1979)

No. 52
- Position: Linebacker

Personal information
- Born: April 26, 1979 (age 47); Stuart, Florida, U.S.
- Listed height: 6 ft 2 in (1.88 m)
- Listed weight: 240 lb (109 kg)

Career information
- High school: Martin County (Stuart)
- College: West Virginia
- NFL draft: 2003: 5th round, 144th overall pick

Career history
- Detroit Lions (2003–2005); New York Giants (2007)*
- * Offseason or practice squad member only

Awards and highlights
- Second-team All-Big East (2002)

Career NFL statistics
- Tackles: 150
- Sacks: 3.5
- Fumble recoveries: 2
- Stats at Pro Football Reference

James "Dirty" Davis (born April 26, 1979) is an American former professional football player who was a linebacker in the National Football League (NFL). He played college football as a linebacker and defensive end for the West Virginia Mountaineers, earning All-Big East Conference second-team honors in 2002. He was selected by the Detroit Lions in the fifth round of the 2003 NFL draft.

== College career ==
Switching from defensive back, linebacker, and end in his four-year collegiate career at West Virginia University, James "Dirty" Davis became one of the better players in school history. The All-Big East second-team honoree in 2002 began his career in 1999 with 18 tackles and a forced fumble. The next season, 2000, Davis recorded 49 tackles, 12 tackles for a loss, and 6 sacks. In his junior season, 2001, Davis totaled 51 tackles, one forced fumble, two fumble recoveries, 14 tackles for a loss, and 8 sacks. In his senior season, 2002, Davis finished his career with a career-high 120 tackles, two forced fumbles, 13.5 tackles for a loss, and four sacks.

== Professional career ==
=== Detroit Lions ===
Davis was selected by the Detroit Lions in the 2003 NFL draft. The fifth round selection played in eight games on the season, recording 8 tackles and two pass break-ups.

In his sophomore season in the league, 2004, Davis played in all 16 games. He set career-highs with 83 tackles, 3.5 sacks, and three pass break-ups. The next season, 2005, Davis only recorded 59 tackles in all sixteen games of the season.

=== New York Giants ===
In 2006, Davis was signed by the New York Giants. He did not see any action during the season however, and was released at the beginning of the 2007 season. He now works as a coach for a local football team.

== NFL career statistics ==
Legend
**Bold**	Career high

Year	Team	Games		Tackles					Interceptions					Fumbles			
Year	Team	GP	GS	Cmb	Solo	Ast	Sck	TFL	Int	Yds	TD	Lng	PD	FF	FR	Yds	TD
2003	DET	8	1	8	8	0	0.0	0	0	0	0	0	2	0	0	0	0
2004	DET	**16**	**15**	**83**	**58**	**25**	**3.5**	**7**	0	0	0	0	**3**	0	**1**	0	0
2005	DET	**16**	14	59	35	24	0.0	3	0	0	0	0	0	0	**1**	0	0
Career		40	30	150	101	49	3.5	10	0	0	0	0	5	0	2	0	0
