= Az-Zahir Hakim =

American football player and coach (born 1977)

No. 81, 83
- Positions: Wide receiver, return specialist

Personal information
- Born: June 3, 1977 (age 49); Los Angeles, California, U.S.
- Listed height: 5 ft 10 in (1.78 m)
- Listed weight: 185 lb (84 kg)

Career information
- High school: Fairfax (Los Angeles)
- College: San Diego State (1994–1997)
- NFL draft: 1998: 4th round, 96th overall pick

Career history

Playing
- St. Louis Rams (1998–2001); Detroit Lions (2002–2004); New Orleans Saints (2005); Detroit Lions (2006); San Diego Chargers (2006); Miami Dolphins (2007)*; Las Vegas Locomotives (2009)*
- * Offseason or practice squad member only

Coaching
- San Diego Fleet (2019) Wide receivers coach; St. Louis BattleHawks (2020) Wide receivers coach

Awards and highlights
- Super Bowl champion (XXXIV); First-team All-Pro (2000); Second-team All-WAC (1995)

Career NFL statistics
- Receptions: 316
- Receiving yards: 4,191
- Receiving touchdowns: 28
- Return yards: 1,981
- Return touchdowns: 3
- Stats at Pro Football Reference

Az-Zahir Ali Hakim (born June 3, 1977) is an American former professional football player who was a wide receiver for nine seasons in the National Football League (NFL). He played college football for the San Diego State Aztecs. He was selected by the St. Louis Rams in the fourth round (96th overall) of the 1998 NFL draft. He also was a member of the Detroit Lions, New Orleans Saints, San Diego Chargers, Miami Dolphins, and Las Vegas Locomotives.

As a coach, he served as the wide receivers coach of the San Diego Fleet of the Alliance of American Football in 2019 and the St. Louis BattleHawks of the XFL in 2020.

== Early life ==
Hakim was an All-City selection as a quarterback, wide receiver, and defensive back at Fairfax High School in Los Angeles, where he also played basketball and ran track.

== College career ==
Hakim was a four-year letterman in football at San Diego State where he started eight games as a senior and caught 37 passes for 595 yards (16.1 avg.) and six touchdowns. He caught 36 passes as a junior for 635 yards and five touchdowns. He was an All-Western Athletic Conference second-team selection as a sophomore after he started 12 games and was fourth in conference with career-high 57 receptions for 1,022 yards (17.9 avg.) and eight touchdowns.

== Professional career ==
Pre-draft measurables
Height	Weight	Arm length	Hand span	40-yard dash	10-yard split	20-yard split	20-yard shuttle	Three-cone drill	Vertical jump
5 ft 9 5/8 in (1.77 m)	179 lb (81 kg)	30 1/2 in (0.77 m)	9 1/4 in (0.23 m)	4.45 s	1.57 s	2.58 s	4.25 s	7.44 s	36.0 in (0.91 m)
All values from NFL Combine

=== 1998 ===
Hakim was drafted by the St. Louis Rams in the fourth round (96th overall) of the 1998 NFL draft. He appeared in nine games including four starts during his rookie season, catching 20 passes for 247 yards and a touchdown. He collected three receptions in first career game at the Chicago Bears on November 8, 1998. He made his first start against the Carolina Panthers two weeks later, making two receptions for 25 yards. He scored two touchdowns (nine-yard touchdown reception, 34-yard run on reverse for a touchdown) in victory over the New England Patriots on December 13.

=== 1999 ===
1999 was quite possibly Hakim's best career season. He would also earn a Super Bowl ring after the Rams beat the Tennessee Titans in Super Bowl XXXIV. During the regular season, Hakim appeared in 15 games and caught 39 passes for 677 yards and eight touchdowns. His touchdown total was second on the team behind only Isaac Bruce's 12, while Hakim's 18.8 average also remains a personal best. Hakim also added his first punt return touchdown on the season.

Hakim had the best game of his career against the Cincinnati Bengals on October 3, becoming only the fourth player in team history to score four touchdowns in a game. The feat tied the mark previous reached by Bob Shaw (1949), Elroy Hirsch (1951), and Harold Jackson (1973). His 84-yard punt return for a touchdown tied for the fifth longest in team history and was the third longest in the league during the 1999 season. He also set the team record for punt return yards in a game with 147. All three of his receptions went for touchdowns (9, 51, 18), and he became the first Rams’ player with three receiving touchdowns in a game since December 15, 1996, when Eddie Kennison accomplished the feat against the Atlanta Falcons.

In addition to his career game, Hakim also posted his first 100-yard receiving game against the Carolina Panthers on December 5. Hakim's four receptions, 122 yards and two scores helped St. Louis clinch the division that day.

=== 2000 ===
Hakim continued his impressive production in 2000, setting career highs in multiple statistical categories. His 53 catches, 734 yards, long reception of 80 yards and 32 receptions for first downs remain personal bests. His four touchdowns on the year also represent the second-best total of his career. On special teams, Hakim's 15.8 punt return average led the NFC and was second in the NFL. He also returned his second punt for a score during the season.

The best game of the season for Hakim came in the regular season opener against the Denver Broncos on September 4. During the game, Hakim racked up five catches, 116 yards and two touchdowns. He set a career best with an 80-yard touchdown grab, and also took a punt 86 yards for a score. Hakim was one of three Rams players to surpass 100 yards on offense during the game (wide receiver Torry Holt and running back Marshall Faulk being the others), marking just the second time in franchise history the feat had been accomplished.

Other highlights on the season for Hakim include a November 5 contest against the Panthers when he had eight catches for 116 yards and a touchdown, as well as a 65-yard punt return in the NFC Wild Card playoff game against the New Orleans Saints on December 30. That game also featured a lowlight for Hakim, as he muffed a Saints' punt in the closing minute, allowing the Saints to retain possession and run out the clock, killing what was nearly an impressive Rams comeback.

=== 2001 ===
In his last season as a member of the Rams, Hakim totaled 39 receptions for 374 yards and three touchdowns. He appeared in all 16 games for the second straight season and started two of them. His punt return average took a significant dive from the year before, dropping from 15.3 in 2000 to just 9.2 in 2001.

In late September, Hakim joined Henry Ellard, LeRoy Irvin, and Eddie Kennison as the only Rams players to amass more than 1,000 career punt return yards. He passed Kennison to move into third place all-time the following month.

Also during the season, Hakim completed his first career pass with a 51-yard touchdown to Isaac Bruce. Hakim also had 90 receiving yards and five rushing yards in a Super Bowl XXXVI loss to the New England Patriots.

=== 2002 ===
Hakim joined the Detroit Lions as a free agent in 2002 and had a rebound season in the punt return game. He started all 10 games in which he appeared during the season, catching 37 passes for 541 yards and three touchdowns. He also posted a 14.8 punt return average and had his third career return touchdown.

It did not take long for Hakim to make a splash with his new team, as he holds the honor of scoring the first touchdown at Ford Field following the team's move from the Pontiac Silverdome. Other season highlights include a career-high nine receptions against the Miami Dolphins and seven catches for 143 yards against and a score on the first offensive play of the game against the Green Bay Packers.

Hakim suffered a hip injury on a shuffle pass against the New York Jets on November 17. He would miss the rest of the season due to the injury, and was the team's leading receiver when he was placed on Injured Reserve on November 10.

=== 2003 ===
Despite missing the first two games of the 2003 season recovering knee surgery, Hakim went on to start 12 of the 14 games he appeared in and become Detroit's leading receiver during the season. He finished the year with 49 catches for 449 yards and four touchdowns.

Highlights from the season include a 21-yard pass to fellow wideout Charles Rogers (the second pass and completion of his career), a two-point conversion on a pass from Joey Harrington against the Chicago Bears, and a crucial 18-yard catch on a game-winning drive in another contest against the Bears. He had 19 catches over a three-game span during the year, which was the most ever for him in that amount. However, his best game of the season came against his former team, as he totaled 101 yards on offense and scored a touchdown against the Rams.

=== 2004 ===
In 2004, Hakim finished second on the team in both receiving yards and receiving touchdowns despite missing four games due to ankle, back and groin injuries during the season. He finished with 31 receptions for 533 yards and three touchdowns.

Early in the season against the Houston Texans, Hakim eclipsed the 3,000-yard receiving mark for his career. In a game against the Minnesota Vikings, he and Roy Williams became the first Lions duo to each reach 100 receiving yards in the same game in nearly five years.

=== 2005 ===
Hakim was released by the Lions in April 2005. He received interest from multiple teams before and on June 15 it was believed he had signed with the Kansas City Chiefs. The move would have reunited him with former Rams head coach Dick Vermeil. However, some provisions in the contracts caused the league to void the deal, and Hakim and Vermeil decided it would be best if he did not join the team. Hakim signed a one-year deal with the New Orleans Saints on June 19.

During the season, Hakim was the team's third best receiver and finished with 34 catches for 489 yards and two touchdowns. He set a career-high with nine kickoff returns, while his punt return average was the lowest of his career at just 7.6 yards.

=== 2006 ===
Despite receiving some interest in the 2006 offseason, Hakim remained unsigned until the regular season began. He signed a one-year deal to return to the Lions in 2006, despite new head coach Rod Marinelli in charge. Not all was unfamiliar to Hakim, however, as this time around with the Lions he would be working with former Rams offensive coordinator and head coach Mike Martz, who was now the offensive coordinator in Detroit.

Hakim's second tenure with the Lions was not nearly as productive or long as the first. In six games with the team, he caught just 17 passes for 147 yards. He was eventually released on October 30, and remained unsigned until joining the San Diego Chargers on December 14 after wide receiver Malcom Floyd was placed on Injured Reserve. Hakim was inactive for all three games as a Charger, resulting in the first season of his professional career in which he did not score a touchdown.

=== Later career ===
After his contract expired following the 2006 season, Hakim once again became a free agent. On March 22, he signed a one-year contract with the Miami Dolphins. The move reunited him with new Dolphins head coach Cam Cameron, who was offensive coordinator in San Diego the previous season.

Hakim signed a contract in the UFL and the Las Vegas Locomotives.

== NFL career statistics ==
Year	Team	Games		Receiving					Rushing					Punt returns					Kickoff returns				
Year	Team	GP	GS	Rec	Yds	Avg	Lng	TD	Att	Yds	Avg	Lng	TD	Ret	Yds	Avg	Lng	TD	Ret	Yds	Avg	Lng	TD
1998	STL	9	4	20	247	12.4	22	1	2	30	15.0	34	1	—	—	—	—	0	—	—	—	—	0
1999	STL	15	0	36	677	18.8	75	8	4	44	11.0	31	0	44	461	10.5	84	1	2	35	17.5	20	0
2000	STL	16	4	53	734	13.8	80	4	5	19	3.8	5	0	32	489	15.3	86	1	1	2	2.0	2	0
2001	STL	16	1	39	374	9.6	33	3	11	50	4.5	12	0	36	330	9.2	32	0	—	—	—	—	0
2002	DET	10	10	37	541	14.6	64	3	4	3	0.8	10	0	10	148	14.8	72	1	—	—	—	—	0
2003	DET	14	12	49	449	9.2	28	4	3	51	17.0	35	0	9	85	9.4	20	0	—	—	—	—	0
2004	DET	12	5	31	533	17.2	39	3	1	0	0.0	0	0	—	—	—	—	0	—	—	—	—	0
2005	NO	12	2	34	489	14.4	42	2	—	—	—	—	0	34	260	7.6	42	0	9	171	19.0	29	0
2006	DET	6	0	17	147	8.6	23	0	1	1	1.0	1	0	—	—	—	—	0	—	—	—	—	0
Career		110	38	316	4,191	13.3	80	28	31	198	6.4	35	1	165	1,773	10.7	86	3	12	208	17.3	29	0

== Coaching career ==
In November 2018, Hakim was named the wide receivers coach for the San Diego Fleet of the Alliance of American Football. The following year, he joined the St. Louis BattleHawks of the XFL in the same position.
