= Casey FitzSimmons =

American football player (born 1980)

No. 82
- Position: Tight end

Personal information
- Born: October 10, 1980 (age 46); Wolf Point, Montana, U.S.
- Listed height: 6 ft 4 in (1.93 m)
- Listed weight: 258 lb (117 kg)

Career information
- High school: Chester (Chester, Montana)
- College: Carroll (1999–2002)
- NFL draft: 2003: undrafted

Career history
- Detroit Lions (2003–2009)

Awards and highlights
- NAIA national champion (2002); Frontier Conference MVP (2002); 4× First-team All-Frontier (1999–2002)

Career NFL statistics
- Receptions: 88
- Receiving yards: 677
- Receiving touchdowns: 5
- Stats at Pro Football Reference

Casey FitzSimmons (born October 10, 1980) is an American former professional football player who was a tight end for the Detroit Lions of the National Football League (NFL). He played college football for the Carroll Fighting Saints

== Early life ==
FitzSimmons attended Chester High School in Chester, Montana, and was an All-Conference, and an All-State honoree. He played four positions—wide receiver, tight end, defensive end and linebacker.

The high school he attended was so small that the football team played eight-man football. Prior to his junior year in high school, he was injured in a motorbike accident and missed the season. He was close to not playing his senior year, but was talked into it by some friends.

== College career ==
FitzSimmons attended Carroll College in Helena, Montana. He finished his college career with 244 receptions for 2,698 yards and 21 touchdowns. His 2001 totals included 78 receptions for 812 yards and five touchdowns and his 2000 totals included 70 catches for 686 yards and eight touchdowns. Also in 2000 and 2001, he earned second-team NAIA All-American honors and was a first-team All-Conference selection all four seasons at Carroll College.

He led the Fighting Saints to the 2002 NAIA National Championship with a 28–7 win over the two-time defending NAIA Champion Georgetown (Ky.). During his senior championship run, earned first-team All-American honors and was named the Frontier Conference MVP and finalist for the NAIA Player of the Year Award while catching 79 passes for 971 yards and six touchdowns.

== Professional career ==
FitzSimmons was undrafted in 2003. He then signed with the Detroit Lions. He returned a kickoff for a touchdown to seal the Lions' win over the Chicago Bears on September 30, 2007. The return made FitzSimmons the heaviest player in NFL history to return a kickoff for a touchdown. On April 14, 2010, FitzSimmons retired from the NFL.

=== Statistics ===
Year	Team	G/S	Rec	Yds	Avg	Lg	TD	STT
2003	Det	16/11	23	160	7.0	22	2	17
2004	Det	16/3	10	103	10.3	27	0	4
2005	Det	14/2	10	45	3.9	11	1	19
2006	Det	11/2	7	71	10.1	18	0	10
2007	Det	16/5	8	85	10.6	22	1	20
2008	Det	14/1	12	85	7.1	16	1	16
TOTALS		87/24	70	549	7.8	27	5	86
