= Dré Bly =

American football player and coach (born 1977)

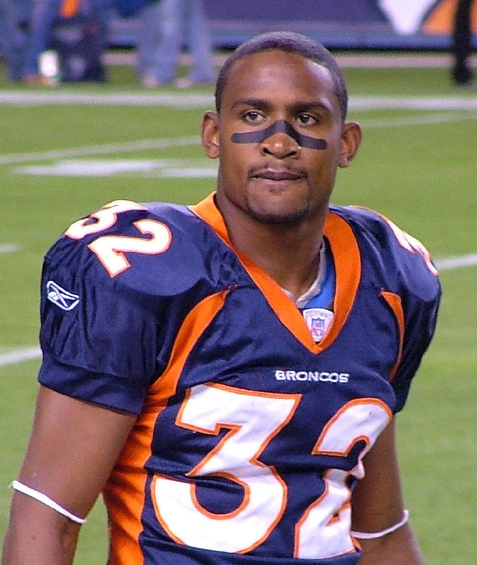
- Bly with the Denver Broncos in 2007

Profile
- Title: Assistant defensive backs coach

Personal information
- Born: May 22, 1977 (age 49); Chesapeake, Virginia, U.S.
- Listed height: 5 ft 10 in (1.78 m)
- Listed weight: 188 lb (85 kg)

Career information
- Position: Cornerback (No. 32, 31)
- High school: Western Branch (Chesapeake)
- College: North Carolina (1995–1998)
- NFL draft: 1999: 2nd round, 41st overall pick

Career history

Playing
- St. Louis Rams (1999–2002); Detroit Lions (2003–2006); Denver Broncos (2007–2008); San Francisco 49ers (2009); Detroit Lions (2010)*
- * Offseason or practice squad member only

Coaching
- North Carolina (2019–2022) Cornerbacks coach; Detroit Lions (2023) Cornerbacks coach; Charlotte (2024) Defensive analyst; New York Jets (2025) Assistant defensive backs coach

Awards and highlights
- Super Bowl champion (XXXIV); 2× Pro Bowl (2003, 2004); St. Louis Rams 10th Anniversary Team; 2× Consensus All-American (1996, 1997); First-team All-American (1998); 3× First-team All-ACC (1996, 1997, 1998); ACC Rookie of the Year (1996); North Carolina Tar Heels Jersey No. 31 honored

Career NFL statistics
- Total tackles: 484
- Sacks: 5
- Forced fumbles: 20
- Fumble recoveries: 9
- Interceptions: 43
- Total touchdowns: 8
- Stats at Pro Football Reference
- College Football Hall of Fame

Donald André Bly (born May 22, 1977) is an American football coach and former player who formerly served as the assistant defensive backs coach for the New York Jets of the National Football League (NFL). He played as a cornerback for 11 seasons in the NFL. He played college football for the North Carolina Tar Heels, earning All-American honors twice. Bly was selected by the St. Louis Rams in the second round of the 1999 NFL draft, and spent four seasons with the Rams, earning a Super Bowl ring with them in Super Bowl XXXIV. He was selected to two Pro Bowls during his four-year tenure with the Detroit Lions, and also played for the Denver Broncos and San Francisco 49ers.

He most-recently served as the cornerbacks coach for the Tar Heels before his departure in 2023.

== Early life ==
Bly was born in Portsmouth, Virginia. He graduated from Western Branch High School in Chesapeake, where he was an all-state high school football player as well as a decorated baseball player for Western Branch Bruins.

== College career ==
Bly attended the University of North Carolina at Chapel Hill, where he played for the North Carolina Tar Heels football team. In his redshirt freshman season at UNC, he led the nation with 11 interceptions. He received all-American honors, and at the time was only one of five players in NCAA history to achieve this honor as a freshman (Tony Dorsett, Herschel Walker, Bjorn Merten, and Marshall Faulk being the others). Bly was the only football player in UNC and Atlantic Coast Conference (ACC) history to receive consensus first-team All-America honors twice in his college career. In his sophomore year, he was one of three finalists for the Bronko Nagurski National Defensive Player of the Year Award. Bly set the ACC record for career interceptions (20), which was later broken by Alphonso Smith of Wake Forest (21). He was elected to the College Football Hall of Fame in 2014.

== Professional career ==
=== Pre-draft ===
Pre-draft measurables
Height	Weight	Arm length	Hand span	40-yard dash	10-yard split	20-yard split	20-yard shuttle	Three-cone drill	Vertical jump	Broad jump
5 ft 9 7/8 in (1.77 m)	186 lb (84 kg)	30 1/8 in (0.77 m)	9 1/8 in (0.23 m)	4.51 s	1.58 s	2.63 s	4.09 s	7.10 s	34.5 in (0.88 m)	9 ft 8 in (2.95 m)
All values from NFL Combine

=== St. Louis Rams ===
==== 1999 ====
The St. Louis Rams selected Bly in the second round (41st overall) of the 1999 NFL draft. He was the sixth cornerback selected in 1999. The Rams acquired the second-round pick (41st overall) they used to select Bly in a trade with the New Orleans Saints for wide receiver Eddie Kennison. He became the second highest drafted defensive back from North Carolina since 1967, following first-round pick (28th overall) Thomas Smith in the 1993 NFL draft.

On July 17, 1999, the Rams signed Bly to a four–year, $2.45 million rookie contract that included a signing bonus of $850,000.

Throughout training camp, he competed against Taje Allen to be a backup cornerback and special teams player under defensive coordinator Peter Giunta. Head coach Dick Vermeil named Bly a backup and listed him as the fourth cornerback on the depth chart to begin the season, behind Dexter McCleon, Todd Lyght, and Taje Allen.

On September 12, 1999, Bly made his professional regular season debut in the St. Louis Rams' home-opener against the Baltimore Ravens and recorded one solo tackle during a 27–10 victory. On October 10, 1999, Bly made one solo tackle, one pass deflection, and had his first career interception on a pass by Jeff Garcia to wide receiver J. J. Stokes as they defeated the San Francisco 49ers 42–20. The following week, he set a season-high with six solo tackles during a 41–13 victory at the Atlanta Falcons in Week 5. On December 5, 1999, Bly made one tackle, one pass deflection, and also intercepted a pass Steve Beuerlein threw to wide receiver Muhsin Muhammad and returned it 45–yards for the first touchdown of his career during a 34–21 victory at the Carolina Panthers. Entering Week 15, defensive coordinator Peter Giunta promoted Bly to the starting nickelback and listed him as the third cornerback on the depth chart, supplanting Taje Allen. In Week 16, Bly earned his first career start as a nickelback and recorded three solo tackles and made one pass deflection as they defeated the Chicago Bears 34–21. He finished his rookie season with 37 combined tackles (31 solo), eight pass deflections, three interceptions, and scored one touchdown in 16 games and two starts.

===== Super Bowl XXXIV =====
The St. Louis Rams finished the 1999 NFL season first in the NFC West with a 13–3 record, clinching a first-round bye. On January 16, 2000, Bly appeared in the first playoff game of his career and recorded four solo tackles during a 49–37 victory against the Minnesota Vikings in the Divisional Round. On January 23, 2000, Bly appeared in the NFC Championship Game against the Tampa Bay Buccaneers and led a comeback as the Rams were losing 6–5 in the fourth quarter. He intercepted a pass Shaun King threw to running back Warrick Dunn with 9:20 remaining in the fourth quarter and the turnover would lead to the game-winning 30–yard touchdown pass from Kurt Warner to wide receiver Ricky Proehl for an 11–6 win against the Buccaneers to advance to the Super Bowl. On January 30, 2000, Bly appeared in Super Bowl XXXIV as a backup cornerback and made one pass deflection as the Rams defeated the Tennessee Titans 23–16 in a closely-contented last second victory.

==== 2000 ====
On February 1, 2000, St. Louis Rams' general manager and head coach Dick Vermeil announced his retirement and offensive coordinator Mike Martz was promoted as his replacement as head coach. The St. Louis Rams selected Jacoby Shepherd in the second round (62nd overall) of the 2000 NFL draft. Throughout training camp, Bly competed against Jacoby Shepherd to be the third cornerback on the depth chart. Head coach Mike Martz named Bly the starting nickelback and listed him as the third cornerback on the depth chart, behind starting duo Dexter McCleon and Todd Lyght.

On September 17, 2000, Bly recorded one solo tackle, set a season-high with three pass deflections, and intercepted a pass by Jeff Garcia as the Rams defeated the San Francisco 49ers 41–24. The following week, he recorded three solo tackles, made one pass deflection, had his first career sack, and intercepted a pass Chris Chandler threw to wide receiver Shawn Jefferson during a 41–20 victory at the Atlanta Falcons in Week 4. He started in place of Todd Lyght for two games (Weeks 10–11) due to a hamstring injury to Lyght that rendered him inactive. On October 29, 2000, Bly earned his first career start as a starting outside cornerback and set a season-high with six solo tackles and had one pass break-up during a 34–24 victory against the San Francisco 49ers. He completed the season with 53 combined tackles (49 solo), ten pass deflections, three interceptions, one sack, and a fumble recovery in 16 games and three starts.

==== 2001 ====
On January 7, 2001, the St. Louis Rams hired Lovie Smith as their new defensive coordinator after firing Peter Giunta (American football). Bly returned to training camp as the No. 3 cornerback on the depth chart after the Rams signed Aeneas Williams as the No. 1 starting cornerback following the departure of Todd Lyght. Head coach Mike Martz named him the starting nickelback and listed him as the third cornerback on the depth chart to begin the season, behind Aeneas Williams and Dexter McCleon.

On September 9, 2001, Bly appeared in the St. Louis Rams' season-opener at the Philadelphia Eagles and set a season-high with three pass deflections and also intercepted a pass by Donovan McNabb to wide receiver Todd Pinkston during a 20–17 overtime victory. On October 8, 2001, Bly recorded six combined tackles (five solo), one pass break-up, and returned an interception by Ty Detmer to wide receiver Germane Crowell during a 36–0 victory at the Detroit Lions. In Week 12, Bly made three solo tackles, a pass deflection, and had his second pick-six of the season after intercepting a pass by Chris Chandler on the game's opening drive and returning it 56–yards for a touchdown during a 35–6 win at the Atlanta Falcons. On December 30, 2001, Bly set a season-high with seven solo tackles, made one pass deflection, and set a career-high with his sixth interception of the season, intercepting a pass Peyton Manning threw to wide receiver Marvin Harrison during a 41–17 win against the Indianapolis Colts. He finished the season with 30 combined tackles (28 solo), ten pass deflections, a forced fumble, and one fumble recovery in 16 games and four starts. He set a career-high with six interceptions and also set a career-high with two touchdowns on interception returns.

===== Super Bowl XXXVI =====
The St. Louis Rams finished the 2001 NFL season atop the NFC West with a 14–2 record to clinch a first-round bye and home-field advantage. On January 20, 2002, Bly recorded four solo tackles and made two pass deflections as the Rams defeated the Green Bay Packers 45–17 in the Divisional Round. In the NFC Championship Game, the Rams defeated the Philadelphia Eagles 24–29. On February 3, 2002, Bly appeared in Super Bowl XXXVI and recorded two solo tackles as the Rams lost 20–17 to the New England Patriots that would kickoff the Brady–Belichick era that would also win two of the next Super Bowls from 2002–2004.

==== 2002 ====
Throughout training camp, he competed for the role as the No. 2 starting cornerback against Dexter McCleon. Head coach Mike Martz named Bly and Aeneas Williams as the starting cornerbacks to begin the season. In Week 5, he set a season-high with eight solo tackles and made one pass deflection during a 37–13 loss at the San Francisco 49ers. On October 20, 2002, Bly had one solo tackle, one pass deflection, and intercepted a pass by Trent Dilfer to wide receiver James Williams as the Rams defeated the Seattle Seahawks 37–20. On December 30, 2002, Bly recorded four solo tackles, made one pass deflection, and led the Rams to a fourth quarter comeback to defeat the San Francisco 49ers 31–20 by forcing a fumble by running back Garrison Hearst and recovering it to return it 20–yards for a touchdown with 6:54 remaining as the Rams were down 20–17. He started all 16 games for the first time in his career and set a career-high with 64 combined tackles (58 solo) and a career-high 21 pass deflections. He also recorded a career-high four forced fumbles, made two fumble recoveries, had two interceptions, one sack, and one touchdown.

=== Detroit Lions ===
==== 2003 ====
On March 1, 2003, the Detroit Lions signed Bly to a five–year, $24.50 million contract that included an initial signing bonus of $6.50 million. The Lions signed Bly to takeover as a starting cornerback following the retirement of former Rams' teammate Todd Lyght. Head coach Steve Mariucci named him the No. 1 starting cornerback to begin the season and paired him with Andre Goodman. On September 3, 2003, the Lions signed Otis Smith after Bly and Chris Watson missed the entire preseason due to an injury.

On September 7, 2003, Bly started in the Detroit Lions' home-opener against the Arizona Cardinals and made an immediate impact with six solo tackles, one pass deflection, and a pick-six after intercepting a pass Jeff Blake to wide receiver Bryan Gilmore during a 42–24 victory. The following week, he recorded one solo tackle, two pass deflections, and intercepted a pass Brett Favre threw to wide receiver Robert Ferguson during a 31–6 loss at the Green Bay Packers in Week 2. In Week 3, Bly recorded five combined tackles (four solo), set a season-high with three pass deflections, and intercepted a pass Gus Frerotte threw to wide receiver Randy Moss during a 23–13 loss to the Minnesota Vikings. This marked his third consecutive game with an interception after debuting with Detroit.

On October 19, 2003, he made one tackle and returned a fumble recovery for a 67–yard touchdown after safety Corey Harris forced a fumble by running back Troy Hambrick during a 38–7 loss to the Dallas Cowboys. He was inactive for two games (Weeks 9–10) after suffering a hamstring injury. On Thanksgiving Day, November 27, 2003, Bly made two solo tackles, three pass deflections, and set a season-high with two interceptions on pass attempts by Brett Favre as the Lions defeated the Green Bay Packers 22–14. He finished the 2003 NFL season with 60 combined tackles (52 solo), 16 pass deflections, two fumble recoveries, and one sack in 14 games and 14 starts. He tied his career-highs with six interceptions and two touchdowns and set a new career-high with five forced fumbles. He was selected to the 2004 Pro Bowl, marking the first Pro Bowl selection of his career.

==== 2004 ====
The Detroit Lions hired Dick Jauron to be their new defensive coordinator following the departure of Kurt Schottenheimer. He entered training camp slated as the de facto No. 1 starting cornerback. Head coach Steve Mariucci named him and Fernando Bryant the starting cornerbacks to begin the season. He was inactive for three games (Weeks 2–4) after injuring his knee injury Week 1. In Week 7, he set a season-high with six combined tackles (four solo) during a 28–13 victory at the New York Giants. On October 31, 2004, Bly made three solo tackles, two pass deflections, set a season-high with two interceptions, and returned an interception he made on a pass Vinny Testaverde threw to wide receiver Keyshawn Johnson for a 55–yard touchdown during a 31–21 loss at the Dallas Cowboys. On December 5, 2004, Bly recorded four combined tackles (three solo), set a season-high with four pass deflections, and intercepted two passes by John Navarre as the Lions defeated the Arizona Cardinals 26–12. He finished the 2004 NFL season with 38 combined tackles (32 solo), 19 pass deflections, four interceptions, and scored one touchdown in 13 games and 13 starts.

==== 2005 ====
On June 10, 2005, the Detroit Lions signed cornerback R. W. McQuarters to compete for the job as the No. 2 starting cornerback against Fernando Bryant. He was named the No. 1 starting cornerback to begin the season and was paired with Fernando Bryant. On September 27, 2005, the Lions officially placed Fernando Bryant on season-ending injured reserve after he dislocated his shoulder in an accidental collision with safety Kenoy Kennedy.

On October 9, 2005, Bly made five combined tackles (four solo), two pass deflections, a forced fumble, a fumble recovery, and set a season-high with two interceptions on passes by Anthony Wright as the Lions defeated the Baltimore Ravens 35–17. In Week 7, Bly made one solo tackle, a pass deflection, and intercepted a pass Trent Dilfer threw to wide receiver Antonio Bryant during a 13–10 victory at the Cleveland Browns. He injured his wrist while making the play and immediately exited the game. His interception was his third consecutive game with a pick. He would remain inactive for the next four games (Weeks 8–11) after it was determined he had dislocated his right wrist and would immediately require surgery. In Week 14, Bly made five combined tackles (four solo), one pass deflection, and intercepted a pass Brett Favre threw to wide receiver Donald Driver during a 16–13 overtime loss at the Green Bay Packers. On November 28, 2005, the Lions fired head coach Steve Mariucci after they fell to a 4–7 record. The following day, on the NFL Network, Bly said Mariucci wouldn't have been fired had Jeff Garcia been healthy enough to play ahead of Joey Harrington all season. He later apologized to the team for being critical of Harrington, who he had blamed for Mariucci's firing. The following week, he set a career-high with 13 combined tackles (11 solo), made two pass deflections, and had his sixth interception of the season on a pass Carson Palmer threw to wide receiver Chad Johnson during a 41–17 loss against the Cincinnati Bengals. He finished the season with 45 combined tackles (41 solo), 13 pass deflections, six interceptions, three forced fumbles, and one fumble recovery in 12 games and 12 starts.

==== 2006 ====
On January 20, 2006, the Detroit Lions hired Rod Marinelli to be their new head coach. New defensive coordinator Donnie Henderson retained Bly as the No. 1 starting cornerback and paired him with Fernando Bryant following the departure of R. W. McQuarters. In Week 4, he recorded three solo tackles and set a season-high with four pass deflections during a 41–34 loss at the St. Louis Rams. In Week 7, he set a season-high with eight combined tackles (six solo) during a 31–24 loss at the New York Jets. He started all 16 games throughout the 2006 NFL season which became the first time he started all 16 games with the Detroit Lions. He finished with 59 combined tackles (51 solo), 18 pass deflections, four forced fumbles, three interceptions, and one fumble recovery.

=== Denver Broncos ===
==== 2007 ====
On March 1, 2007, the Denver Broncos traded running back Tatum Bell, offensive tackle George Foster, and a fifth-round pick (154th overall) in the 2007 NFL draft to the Detroit Lions in exchange for Bly. The Broncos were in immediate need of a starting caliber cornerback to replace their No. 2 starting cornerback Darrent Williams after he was murdered in a drive-by shooting outside of a nightclub while occupying a Hummer limousine.

On March 28, 2007, the Denver Broncos signed Bly to a five–year, $33 million contract extension that includes $16 million guaranteed and another $2 million with bonuses and incentives. The contract restructered his previous agreement with the Lions that had one–year and $4.2 million remaining. Head coach Mike Shanahan named him the No. 2 starting cornerback to begin the season and paired him with Champ Bailey.

On September 16, 2007, Bly made one tackle, one pass deflection, and helped lead the Broncos to a 23–20 overtime victory against the Oakland Raiders by intercepting a pass Josh McCown threw to Jerry Porter with 27 seconds remaining in the fourth quarter to send the game into overtime. In Week 7, Bly recorded three combined tackles (two solo), set a season-high with three pass deflections, and intercepted a pass thrown by Ben Roethlisberger to wide receiver Santonio Holmes during a 31–28 win against the Pittsburgh Steelers. In Week 10, he set a season-high with five solo tackles, made two pass deflections, and intercepted a pass Damon Huard threw to wide receiver Eddie Kennison during a 27–11 win at the Kansas City Chiefs. The following game, Bly recorded five combined tackles (four solo), tied his season-high of three pass deflections, and helped secure a 34–20 victory against the Tennessee Titans with an interception on a pass Vince Young threw to wide receiver Eric Moulds with 5:12 remaining in the fourth quarter. He started all 16 games for the second consecutive season and made 51 combined tackles (41 solo), 15 pass deflections, and led the team with five interceptions.

==== 2008 ====
On January 8, 2008, the Denver Broncos fired assistant head coach/defensive coordinator Jim Bates after a 7–9 record in 2007. Bobby Slowik was given full responsibility over the defense as defensive coordinator and chose to retain Bly and Champ Bailey as the starting cornerbacks. On February 18, 2008, the Denver Broncos and Bly agreed to restructure his contract to free up salary cap space. In Week 4, he set a season-high with six combined tackles (five solo) during a 33–19 loss at the Kansas City Chiefs. On November 16, 2008, Bly made five combined tackles (four solo), one pass deflection, and intercepted a pass Matt Ryan threw to wide receiver Roddy White during a 24–20 win at the Atlanta Falcons. In Week 13, he recorded three combined tackles (two solo), set a season-high with two pass deflections, and intercepted a pass from Brett Favre to wide receiver Laveranues Coles during a 34–17 victory at the New York Jets. Bly was promoted to the No. 1 starting cornerback after Champ Bailey tore a groin muscle and remained inactive for seven games (Weeks 9–15). On December 30, 2008, the Broncos fired head coach Mike Shanahan after they finished with an 8–8 record. He started all 16 games throughout the 2008 NFL season and finished with 62 combined tackles (54 solo), eight pass deflections, and two interceptions.

On January 11, 2009, the Denver Broncos hired Josh McDaniels as their new head coach. On February 17, 2009, the Broncos officially released Bly after only two seasons.

=== Later career ===
On May 21, 2009, Bly signed a one-year, $845,000 contract with the San Francisco 49ers. On July 2, 2010, Bly re-signed with the Detroit Lions, but was released on September 4.

== NFL career statistics ==
Legend
**Bold**	Career high

Year	Team	GP	Tackles				Fumbles				Interceptions					
Year	Team	GP	Cmb	Solo	Ast	Sck	FF	FR	Yds	TD	Int	Yds	Avg	Lng	TD	PD
1999	STL	16	19	16	3	0.0	0	0	0	0	3	53	17.6	53	1	8
2000	STL	16	43	39	4	**1.0**	0	1	0	0	3	44	14.6	22	0	10
2001	STL	16	29	27	2	0.0	1	1	15	0	**6**	**150**	25.0	**93**	**2**	9
2002	STL	16	59	**54**	5	**1.0**	4	2	33	**1**	2	0	0.0	0	0	**20**
2003	DET	14	55	47	8	**1.0**	**5**	**3**	**113**	**1**	**6**	89	14.8	48	1	15
2004	DET	13	38	32	6	0.0	0	0	0	0	4	107	**26.8**	55	1	19
2005	DET	12	42	38	4	0.0	3	1	0	0	**6**	54	9.0	28	0	15
2006	DET	16	57	49	8	0.0	4	1	5	0	3	13	4.3	8	0	18
2007	DEN	16	51	41	**10**	**1.0**	0	0	0	0	5	71	14.2	37	0	14
2008	DEN	16	**62**	**54**	8	0.0	1	0	0	0	2	5	2.5	5	0	8
2009	SF	16	29	26	3	**1.0**	2	**3**	3	0	3	66	22.0	31	0	13
Career		167	484	423	61	5.0	20	12	169	2	43	652	15.2	93	5	149

== Coaching career ==
In October 2018, Bly was named the defensive backs coach for the San Diego Fleet of the Alliance of American Football. However, in December prior to the start of the season, he joined North Carolina's coaching staff as their cornerbacks coach. He and the Tar Heels mutually parted ways on January 11, 2023. He was hired by the Detroit Lions as their cornerbacks coach on February 2, 2023.

On February 11, 2025, the New York Jets hired Bly to serve as their assistant defensive backs coach.

== Personal life ==
Bly and his wife, Kristyn, have four sons, Trey, Jordan, AJ, and Emanuel, and a daughter, Peyton. Trey was a cornerback at Charlotte. Jordan played wide receiver for the Orlando Storm. His nephews, Josh Downs and Caleb Downs, play for the Kansas City Chiefs and the Dallas Cowboys, respectively.

In 2017, Bly was voted into the Virginia Sports Hall of Fame.
