= 2005 Detroit Lions season =

NFL team season

- Owner: William Clay Ford Sr.
- General manager: Matt Millen
- Head coach: Steve Mariucci (fired on November 28, 4-7 record); Dick Jauron (interim, 1-4 record)
- Home stadium: Ford Field

Results
- Record: 5–11
- Division place: 3rd NFC North
- Playoffs: Did not qualify
- Pro Bowlers: DT Shaun Rogers

Uniform

The 2005 season was the Detroit Lions' 76th in the National Football League (NFL), their 72nd as the Detroit Lions, their fourth playing home games at Ford Field, and the third and final under head coach Steve Mariucci. The Lions failed to improve on their 6–10 record from 2004, dropping one more game than last year, and missed the postseason.

Following a Thanksgiving Day loss to the Atlanta Falcons, the Lions fired head coach Steve Mariucci, naming defensive coordinator and former Chicago Bears head coach Dick Jauron as their interim coach. Mariucci compiled a 15–28 record with the Lions.

The team started 3–3 before dropping 2 of their last 10 and finishing 5–11. The team finished bottom-tier in offense and below-average in defense. Defensive tackle Shaun Rogers was the only Lion named to the Pro Bowl, finishing his season with 5.5 sacks, 41 tackles, and 2 forced fumbles including a fumble recovery for a touchdown.

The passing game was headed by both fourth-year starter Joey Harrington and veteran Jeff Garcia, starting 11 and 5 games respectively. Harrington finished with 2,021 passing yards while throwing for 12 interceptions, matching last season's total. The receiving game was led by Roy Williams, while the run game was led by sophomore Kevin Jones.

== Offseason ==
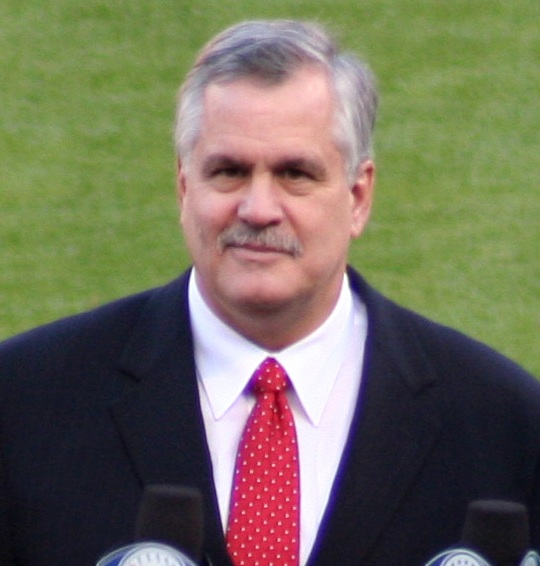
Matt Millen, president and general manager of the Detroit Lions, signed a five-year extension with the team.

=== Coaching changes ===
Offensive coordinator Sherman Lewis retired after a 37-year coaching career. The Lions hired Ted Tollner, the San Francisco 49ers' offensive coordinator during their 2004 season, to be their offensive coordinator. Fred Graves replaced Kevin Higgins as the wide receivers coach. After losing linebackers coach Richard Smith to the Miami Dolphins, the Lions elevated defensive assistant Johnny Holland to his position and hired former Washington defensive coordinator Phil Snow as defensive assistant. In July, president Matt Millen agreed to a five-year contract extension that would put him in Detroit through the 2010 season.

=== Free agency ===
On the defensive side of the ball, defensive tackle and two-time Pro-Bowler Shaun Rogers signed a six-year extension with the team. The Lions also re-signed safety Bracy Walker, defensive tackle Marcus Bell, linebackers Wali Rainer and Donté Curry, and cornerbacks Chris Cash and André Goodman. Offensively, the Lions re-signed full-time starter and center Dominic Raiola to a five-year deal. Kick returner and Pro Bowler Eddie Drummond, looking for a multi-year deal, held out for one week before signing a one-year contract. The Lions filled in needs at wide receiver with the signing of Kevin Johnson. On special teams, the Lions re-signed punter Nick Harris.

At quarterback, the Lions signed veteran and three-time Pro Bowlers Jeff Garcia, reuniting him with head coach Steve Mariucci, with whom he played for while Mariucci was coaching the San Francisco 49ers. Two weeks prior, the Cleveland Browns released Garcia after a turbulent season where he went for 1,731 yards, 10 touchdowns, and 9 interceptions while completing 57% of his passes. The Lions also signed safety Kenoy Kennedy, tight end Marcus Pollard, offensive linemen Rick DeMulling and Kyle Kosier, cornerback R. W. McQuarters, and running back Jamel White. The Lions cut wide receiver Az-Zahir Hakim, who posted 31 receptions for 533 yards in 2004. They also cut safety Brock Marion and offensive lineman Matt Joyce.

=== Legal issues ===
In May, defensive end Kalimba Edwards was pulled over by a state trooper in Southfield, Michigan. After refusing to produce a driver's license, the trooper ordered Edwards out of the vehicle, to which he complied. After attempting to arrest him, Edwards resisted and was pepper sprayed. In June, Edwards pleaded guilty to two charges and was sentenced to one year probation. Wide receiver David Kircus was arrested on June 25 for a DUI, pleading guilty on July 6 to the misdemeanor. He was ordered to pay $850 in fines and sentenced to one day time served.

In early October, the league suspended Charles Rogers for four games for violating the NFL's substance abuse policy. Nearly a month and a half later, the Lions filed a grievance against Rogers, seeking $10.1 million of Rogers' $14.4 million signing bonus alleging he violated his contract. In September 2008, the Lions would win their grievance, with an arbitrator ruling Rogers must pay the Lions $8.5 million.

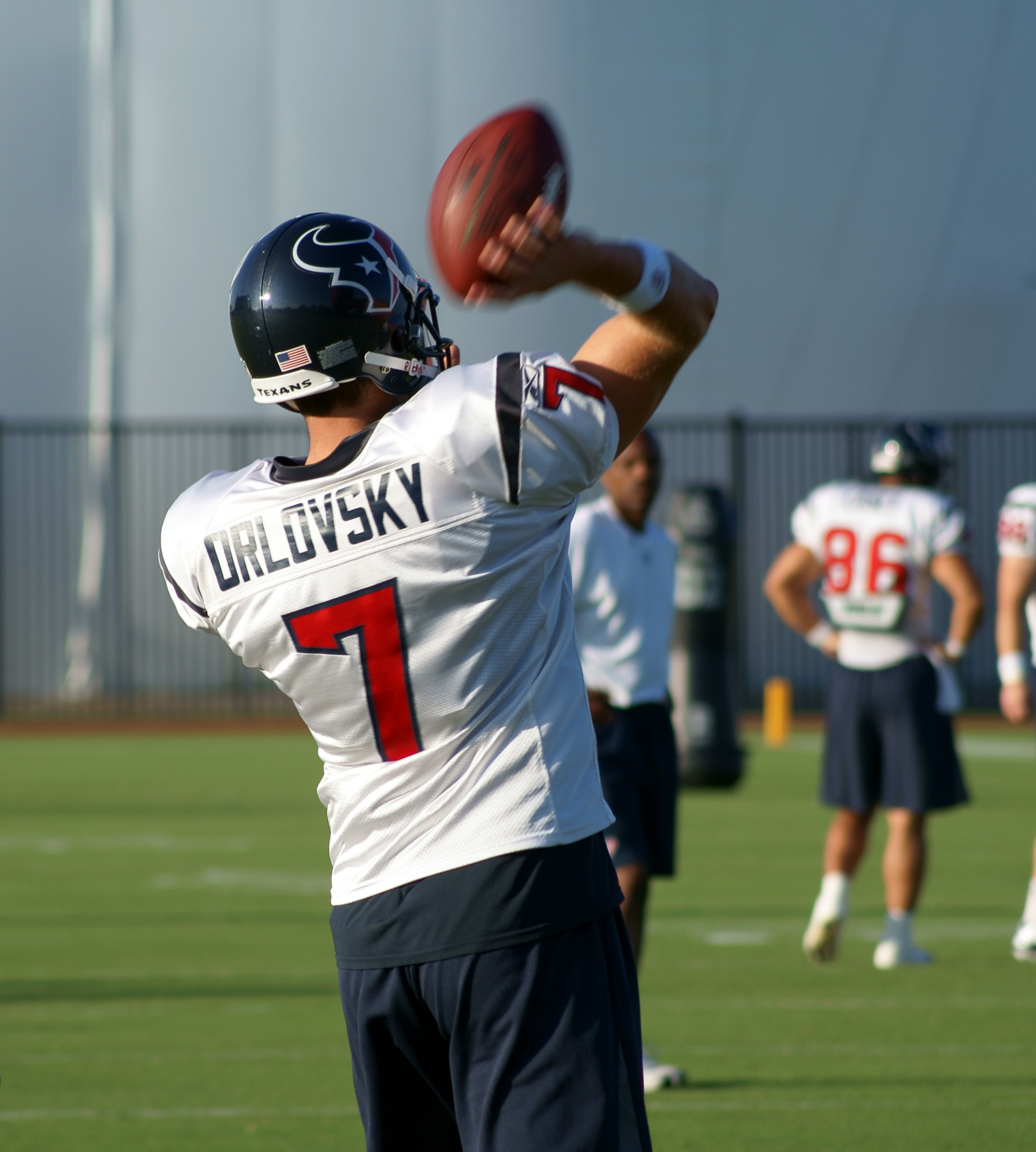
In the fifth round, the Lions would draft quarterback Dan Orlovsky, who would start one season out his seven total seasons with the team.

=== Draft ===
In the first round, the Lions drafted wide receiver Mike Williams out of USC. With the Lions, he put up 449 yards and 2 touchdowns. Williams was seen as another bust in a three-year stretch of the Lions drafting wide receivers in the first round and lasted just two seasons with the team. Second-round selection, Shaun Cody, played four seasons with the Lions, catching one interception, posting 1.5 sacks, and getting 92 tackles. Third-round pick Stanley Wilson Jr. played 32 games for the Lions, posting 89 tackles and 8 passes defended. Fifth-round selection, Dan Orlovsky, would sit on the bench for a few seasons in Detroit. In the 2008 season, he would play 10 games for the Lions, posting 1,616 yards with 8 touchdowns and interceptions as he went 0–7 in his starts. He would leave the Lions after 2008 before returning in 2014, playing two games total in 2015. Both sixth-round picks, Bill Swancutt and Johnathan Goddard, lasted one season in the league.

2005 Detroit Lions draft
Round	Pick	Player	Position	College	Notes
1	10	Mike Williams	Wide receiver	USC	
2	37	Shaun Cody	Defensive tackle	USC	
3	72	Stanley Wilson	Cornerback	Stanford	
5	145	Dan Orlovsky	Quarterback	Connecticut	from Arizona via New England
6	184	Bill Swancutt	Defensive end	Oregon State	
6	206	Johnathan Goddard	Linebacker	Marshall	
Made roster † Pro Football Hall of Fame * Made at least one Pro Bowl during career

== Staff ==
2005 Detroit Lions staff
Front office: Owner and chairman – William Clay Ford Sr.; Vice chairman – William Clay Ford Jr.; President and chief executive officer – Matt Millen; Executive vice president and chief operating officer – Tom Lewand; Senior vice president and assistant general manager – Martin Mayhew; Director of pro personnel – Sheldon White; Director of college scouting – Scott McEwen; Assistant director of pro personnel – Charlie Sanders; Head coaches: Head coach – Steve Mariucci; Interim head coach/defensive coordinator – Dick Jauron; Assistant to the head coach – Kevin Lartigue; Offensive coaches: Offensive coordinator – Ted Tollner; Quarterbacks – Greg Olson; Running backs – Tom Rathman; Wide receivers – Fred Graves; Tight ends – Andy Sugarman; Offensive line – Pat Morris; Assistant offensive line/tight ends – Sean Kugler; Offensive assistant – Adam Gase; Coaching assistant – Shawn Jefferson	Defensive coaches: Defensive line – Larry Brooks; Linebackers – Johnny Holland; Defensive backs – George Catavolos; Defensive assistant – Don Clemons; Defensive assistant – Phil Snow; Special teams coaches: Special teams coordinator – Chuck Priefer; Assistant special teams – Stan Kwan; Strength and conditioning: Strength and conditioning – Jason Arapoff; Strength and conditioning – Malcolm Blacken; Assistant strength and conditioning – Mondray Gee

== Roster ==
2005 Detroit Lions roster
Quarterbacks (QB): 5 Jeff Garcia; 3 Joey Harrington; 9 Dan Orlovsky; Running backs (RB): 24 Shawn Bryson; 34 Kevin Jones; 21 Artose Pinner; 30 Cory Schlesinger FB; 27 Paul Smith FB; Wide receivers (WR): 18 Eddie Drummond; 16 Troy Edwards; 80 Charles Rogers; 10 Scottie Vines; 88 Mike Williams; 11 Roy Williams; Tight ends (TE): 82 Casey FitzSimmons; 49 Sean McHugh; 81 Marcus Pollard	Offensive linemen (OL): 76 Jeff Backus OT; 79 Kelly Butler OT; 64 Rick DeMulling G; 63 Brock Gutierrez C; 69 Kyle Kosier G; 51 Dominic Raiola C; 71 Victor Rogers OT; 65 Damien Woody G; Defensive linemen (DL): 94 Marcus Bell DT; 75 Shaun Cody DT; 95 Jared DeVries DE; 98 Kalimba Edwards DE; 96 James Hall DE; 78 Cory Redding DE; 92 Shaun Rogers DT; 90 Bill Swancutt DE; 72 Dan Wilkinson DT	Linebackers (LB): 55 Donté Curry; 52 James Davis OLB; 48 Matt Grootegoed OLB; 58 Wali Rainer OLB; 53 Nate Wayne OLB; 57 LeVar Woods MLB; Defensive backs (DB): 32 Dré Bly CB; 36 Vernon Fox SS; 35 André Goodman CB; 26 Kenoy Kennedy SS; 44 Scott McGarrahan FS; 40 Jon McGraw FS; 31 R. W. McQuarters CB; 38 Keith Smith CB; 28 Bracy Walker FS; 29 Stanley Wilson Jr. CB; Special teams (ST): 4 Jason Hanson K; 2 Nick Harris P; 67 Don Muhlbach LS	Practice squad: 99 Sarth Benoit OLB; 77 Kevin Carberry DT; 86 Paris Hamilton WR (IR); 12 Glenn Martinez WR; 43 Will Matthews FB (IR); 74 Levi Newton G; 60 Dave Pearson C; 89 Jason Randall TE; 15 DeAndrew Rubin WR; 73 Clint Stickdorn OT; Reserve: 97 Boss Bailey OLB (IR); 25 Fernando Bryant CB (IR); 50 Earl Holmes OLB (IR); 42 Terrence Holt FS (IR); -- Cliff Johnson S (NF-Inj.); 85 Kevin Johnson WR (IR); 54 Teddy Lehman MLB (IR); 59 Alex Lewis MLB (IR); 62 David Loverne G (IR); -- Robby Valenzuela OT; Rookies in italics 53 active, 12 reserve, 8 practice squad

== Preseason ==
The Lions began their preseason schedule against the New York Jets. The Jets opened the scoring with a 1-yard touchdown run in the second quarter, with the Lions response being a Jason Hanson 22-yard field goal. The Jets would kick a field goal of their own in a turnover heavy game as the Lions fell 3–10. The two teams combined for five turnovers and ten punts.

Week	Date	Opponent	Result	Record	Attendance
1	August 12	New York Jets	L 3–10	0–1	77,865
2	August 20	at Cleveland Browns	L 13–21	0–2	58,371
3	August 29	at St. Louis Rams	L 13–37	0–3	58,625
4	September 2	Buffalo Bills	W 21–7	1–3	53,713

== Regular season ==
=== Overview ===
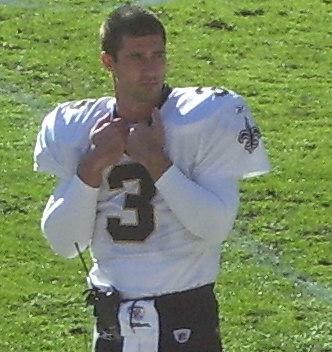
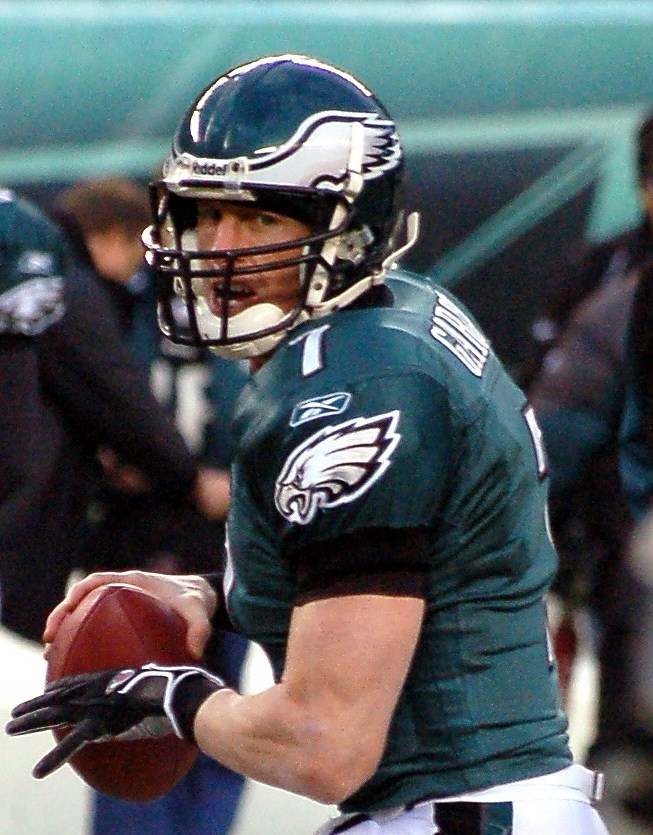
Joey Harrington (left) and Jeff Garcia (right) fought for the starting quarterback position throughout the season.

The Lions began their season 3–3, tied for first in the NFC North, before finishing 2–8 and ending the season 5–11, missing the playoffs. They suffered their fifth straight losing season and finished third in the North. The offense, headed first by coordinator Ted Tollner and then Greg Olson, finished bottom 6 in both points scored and yards. The passing and running game both finished 26th in yards. Fourth-year quarterback Joey Harrington led the team in passing yards with 2,021 and 12 touchdowns to 12 interceptions, while quarterback Jeff Garcia finished with 937 yards, three touchdowns, and six interceptions. The run game was headed by sophomore Kevin Jones, who rushed for 664 yards and 5 touchdowns. Wide receiver Roy Williams led the team in receiving with 687 yards and 8 touchdowns.

The quarterback situation in Detroit was tumultuous. In March, the Lions signed veteran quarterback Jeff Garcia in the offseason after losing Mike McMahon to the Philadelphia Eagles in free agency. Garcia was seen as an immediate competitor for the starting quarterback role. Garcia was coming off a season where he threw for 1,731 yards and a 10–9 touchdown–interception ratio. In the final game of the preseason, Garcia, filling in for the injured Joey Harrington, suffered a broken fibula after a hit from a defensive player. After finding out he wouldn't need surgery, Garcia's return was slated to be within six to eight weeks. The Lions named Harrington as the starter to begin the season. After Garcia returned to practice in mid-October, Mariucci benched Harrington in favor of Garcia: he led Detroit to a 13–10 victory over the Cleveland Browns. However, after just two games, Garcia was benched for Harrington after taking multiple shots in their Week 8 matchup versus the Chicago Bears. He was also sat for the Week 10 and 11 game due to issues with the same leg he broke in the preseason. On the Thanksgiving Day matchup versus the Atlanta Falcons, Harrington was benched in the first half for Garcia after throwing an interception. After Mariucci was fired, cornerback Dré Bly blamed Harrington for the firing of Mariucci, saying that he wouldn't have been fired if Garcia was the full-time starting quarterback. Harrington said of the statement: "I'm not ever going to validate what he said. I'm not going to get into a war of words with Dre'." Bly later apologized to the team. Interim head coach Dick Jauron named Garcia as the starter versus the Vikings. Garcia was benched for Harrington during the Week 15 matchup versus the Bengals, and Harrington was named the starter for the rest of the season.

In June, wide receiver Charles Rogers was cleared for contact after breaking his collarbone in each of the last two seasons. During the first game of the season, veteran kicker Jason Hanson injured his hamstring, leading the Lions to activate kicker Remy Hamilton. Cornerback Fernando Bryant went down in Week 2 with a separated right shoulder, ending his season. The Lions also lost Rogers to a four-game suspension in early October due to a violation of the NFL's substance abuse policy. They lost another wide receiver when, during the Week 5 matchup against the Baltimore Ravens, Roy Williams went down with a leg injury. Cornerback Dré Bly was out for three to four weeks due to a wrist injury suffered during Week 7. The Lions also lost running back Kevin Jones with a shoulder injury that sat him out of the Week 9 game. In the last four weeks of the season, the Lions put three linebackers on injured reserve: Teddy Lehman, Boss Bailey, and Earl Holmes. They also lost safety Terrence Holt to the injured reserve due to an elbow injury.

=== Schedule ===
Week	Date	Opponent	Result	Record	Venue	Attendance
1	September 11	Green Bay Packers	W 17–3	1–0	Ford Field	61,877
2	September 18	at Chicago Bears	L 6–38	1–1	Soldier Field	62,019
3	Bye					
4	October 2	at Tampa Bay Buccaneers	L 13–17	1–2	Raymond James Stadium	64,994
5	October 9	Baltimore Ravens	W 35–17	2–2	Ford Field	61,201
6	October 16	Carolina Panthers	L 20–21	2–3	Ford Field	61,083
7	October 23	at Cleveland Browns	W 13–10	3–3	Cleveland Browns Stadium	72,923
8	October 30	Chicago Bears	L 13–19 (OT)	3–4	Ford Field	61,814
9	November 6	at Minnesota Vikings	L 14–27	3–5	Hubert H. Humphrey Metrodome	63,813
10	November 13	Arizona Cardinals	W 29–21	4–5	Ford Field	61,091
11	November 20	at Dallas Cowboys	L 7–20	4–6	Texas Stadium	62,670
12	November 24	Atlanta Falcons	L 7–27	4–7	Ford Field	62,390
13	December 4	Minnesota Vikings	L 16–21	4–8	Ford Field	61,375
14	December 11	at Green Bay Packers	L 13–16 (OT)	4–9	Lambeau Field	70,019
15	December 18	Cincinnati Bengals	L 17–41	4–10	Ford Field	61,749
16	December 24	at New Orleans Saints	W 13–12	5–10	Alamodome	63,747
17	January 1	at Pittsburgh Steelers	L 21–35	5–11	Heinz Field	63,794

=== Game summaries ===
==== Week 1: vs. Green Bay Packers ====
Week 1: Green Bay Packers at Detroit Lions – Game summary

Quarter	1	2	3	4	Total
Packers	0	3	0	0	3
Lions	7	0	3	7	17

at Ford Field, Detroit, Michigan

- Date: September 11
- Game time: 3:15 p.m. CDT
- Game weather: None (indoor stadium)
- Game attendance: 61,877
- Referee: Jeff Triplette
- Recap

Game information

First quarter

- DET – Marcus Pollard 9-yard pass from Joey Harrington (Jason Hanson kick), 4:56. Lions 7–0. Drive: 8 plays, 68 yards, 3:54.

Second quarter

- GB – Ryan Longwell 50-yard field goal, 2:59. Lions 7–3. Drive: 11 plays, 37 yards, 4:51.

Third quarter

- DET – Jason Hanson 21-yard field goal, 8:34. Lions 10–3. Drive: 10 plays, 31 yards, 4:44.

Fourth quarter

- DET – Mike Williams 3-yard pass from Joey Harrington (Jason Hanson kick), 4:13. Lions 17–3. Drive: 7 plays, 58 yards, 3:22.

Top passers

- GB – Brett Favre – 27/44, 201 yards, 2 INT
- DET – Joey Harrington – 15/28, 167 yards, 2 TD

Top rushers

- GB – Ahman Green – 12 rushes, 58 yards
- DET – Kevin Jones – 25 rushes, 87 yards

Top receivers

- GB – Donald Driver – 4 receptions, 48 yards
- DET – Marcus Pollard – 5 receptions, 58 yards, TD

In their opening game of the season, the Lions hosted the Green Bay Packers. Both teams punted to begin their opening possessions. The Lions took their second drive 68 yards capped off by a Joey Harrington touchdown pass to Marcus Pollard to take the early 7–0 lead. The Packers responded with a 14-play drive that got them down to Detroit's 4-yard line. After lining up in field goal formation, the Packers ran a fake field goal that failed, ending in a fumble recovery for Detroit. The Lions would turn the ball over on downs in Packer territory. The Packers took their next drive 11 plays and 37 yards capped off by a Ryan Longwell 50-yard field goal. Three punts would end the first half with the Lions up 7–3.

The Packers fumbled their opening possession of the half, which the Lions capitalized on with a Jason Hanson 21-yard field goal. After eight straight punts brought the game into the fourth quarter, Brett Favre threw an interception to Kenoy Kennedy. After a Harrington pass to Charles Rogers went for 31, Harrington found Mike Williams for a 3-yard touchdown pass. The Packers brought their next drive past the two-minute warning where, with 0:30 left, Favre would throw an interception to Terrence Holt, sealing the 17–3 victory for the Lions and their third consecutive season-opener win.

==== Week 2: at Chicago Bears ====
Week 2: Detroit Lions at Chicago Bears – Game summary

Quarter	1	2	3	4	Total
Lions	6	0	0	0	6
Bears	10	21	0	7	38

at Soldier Field, Chicago, Illinois

- Date: September 18
- Game time: 12:00 p.m. CDT
- Game weather: Sunny, 76 °F (24 °C)
- Game attendance: 62,019
- Referee: Tony Corrente
- Recap

Game information

First quarter

- CHI – Thomas Jones 3-yard run (Doug Brien kick good), 10:10. Chicago 7–0 Drive: 7 plays, 43 yards, 3:39.
- DET – Roy Williams 51-yard pass from Joey Harrington (Remy Hamilton kick failed), 9:54. Chicago 7–6 Drive: 1 play, 51 yards, 0:16.
- CHI – Doug Brien 48-yard field goal, 6:04. Chicago 10–6 Drive: 9 plays, 32 yards, 3:50.

Second quarter

- CHI – Bobby Wade 73-yard punt return (Doug Brien kick good), 11:34. Chicago 17–6.
- CHI – Muhsin Muhammad 28-yard pass from Kyle Orton (Doug Brien kick good), 1:14. Chicago 24–6 Drive: 7 plays, 80 yards, 3:25.
- CHI – Mike Brown 41-yard interception return (Doug Brien kick good), 0:57. Chicago 31–6.

Third quarter

- No scoring plays

Fourth quarter

- CHI – Thomas Jones 16-yard rush (Doug Brien kick good), 12:13. Chicago 38–6 Drive: 2 plays, 38 yards, 0:39.

Top passers

- DET – Joey Harrington – 19/37, 196 yards, TD, 5 INT
- CHI – Kyle Orton – 14/21, 150 yards, TD

Top receivers

- DET – Muhsin Muhammad – 6 receptions, 81 yards, TD
- CHI – Roy Williams – 5 receptions, 96 yards, TD

Top rushers

- DET – Kevin Jones – 8 rushes, 22 yards
- CHI – Thomas Jones – 20 rushes, 139 yards, TD

In Week 2, the Lions went on the road to face the Chicago Bears. The Lions turned the ball over on the first possession with a Joey Harrington interception. The Bears capitalized with a Thomas Jones rushing touchdown. The Lions immediately answered on their first play from scrimmage with a Harrington 51-yard touchdown pass to Roy Williams. However, with kicker Jason Hanson out due to an injury, back-up kicker Remy Hamilton tried the extra point and missed, leaving the score at 6–7. The Bears turned their next possession into points with a Doug Brien 48-yard field goal. The Lions went three-and-out on their next possession, setting up a Brien 48-yard field goal for the Bears. However, it was missed wide left and kept the score at 6–10 going into the second quarter. After trading punts, the Lions had another three-and-out and punted the ball. Return man Bobby Wade took the ball at Chicago's 27 before running it back 73 yards for the score. The Lions look poised to respond, getting down to Chicago's 12 on the back of three third down conversions. However, on third and 3, Harrington was intercepted by Nathan Vasher. The Bears tacked onto their score with a 28-yard Kyle Orton touchdown pass. On the first play from scrimmage on their next drive, Harrington threw his third interception, this time for a pick-six, which put the score at 31–6 heading into halftime.

Three punts started the game before the Lions turned it over on downs. Heading into the fourth, the Bears tried a 36-yard field goal but missed it wide right. After another Harrington interception put the Bears at the Lions' 38, they scored on a Jones 16-yard run. Harrington threw his fifth interception of the day, and both teams benched their starters as the Lions fell 6–38.

==== Week 4: at Tampa Bay Buccaneers ====
Week 4: Detroit Lions at Tampa Bay Buccaneers – Game summary

Quarter	1	2	3	4	Total
Lions	0	10	0	3	13
Buccaneers	3	7	7	0	17

at Raymond James Stadium, Tampa, Florida

- Date: October 2
- Game time: 1:00 p.m. EDT
- Game weather: Partly cloudy, 87 °F (31 °C)
- Game attendance: 64,994
- Referee: Gerry Austin
- Recap

Game information

First quarter

- TAM – Matt Bryant 43-yard field goal, 7:59. Tampa Bay 3–0 Drive: 10 plays, 30 yards, 3:46.

Second quarter

- DET – Jason Hanson 44-yard field goal, 11:30. Tied 3–3 Drive: 4 plays, 7 yards, 2:14.
- DET – Kevin Jones 8-yard run (Jason Hanson kick good), 4:58. Detroit 10–3 Drive: 2 plays, 8 yards, 0:48.
- TAM – Michael Pittman 41-yard pass from Brian Griese (Matt Bryant kick good), 1:12. Tied 10–10 Drive: 10 plays, 90 yards, 3:46.

Third quarter

- TAM – Joey Galloway 80-yard pass from Brian Griese (Matt Bryant kick good), 14:05. Tampa Bay 17–10 Drive: 3 plays, 80 yards, 0:55.

Fourth quarter

- DET – Jason Hanson 23-yard field goal, 7:29. Tampa Bay 17–13 Drive: 7 plays, 18 yards, 3:37.

Top passers

- DET – Joey Harrington – 15/27, 137 yards
- TAM – Brian Griese – 22/39, 302 yards, 2 TD, 3 INT

Top receivers

- DET – Roy Williams – 3 receptions, 54 yards
- TAM – Joey Galloway – 7 receptions, 166 yards, TD

Top rushers

- DET – Kevin Jones – 12 rushes, 38 yards, TD
- TAM – Michael Pittman – 5 rushes, 30 yards

Following their Week 3 bye, the Lions traveled to Tampa, Florida to face the Tampa Bay Buccaneers. The Lions punted on the opening drive. The Buccaneers took their opening drive to Detroit's 24-yard line, kicking a 43-yard field goal to take the early 3–0 lead. After three straight punts, the Lions got the ball after Bucs quarterback Brian Griese was strip-sacked by Kalimba Edwards. They capitalized with a Hanson 44-yard field goal. After two punts, an errant pass by Griese was intercepted by Teddy Lehman. The Lions scored on a Kevin Jones 8-yard run to go up 10–3. On the next drive, the Lions nearly got the ball back again after André Goodman intercepted a Griese pass. However, Goodman was flagged for defensive holding, and the Bucs scored on a Michael Pittman Sr. 41-yard touchdown pass. The two teams traded turnovers to end the first half.

To open the second half, the Bucs scored on a Griese 80-yard deep shot to Joey Galloway to go up 17–10. After a Lions punt, the Bucs missed a 46-yard field goal from Matt Bryant. The Lions once again punted before getting the ball back after Terrence Holt intercepted Griese. The Lions kicked a 23-yard field goal to pull within 4 at 13–17. After a Buccaneers punt, the Lions would attempt a game-winning drive with 5:14 left. After converting a fourth down, the Lions got within Tampa Bay's red zone with 0:20 left. On 2nd and 1 from the 12-yard line, Harrington threw a pass to Marcus Pollard that was caught for an apparent game-winning touchdown. However, replay review determined that Pollard was out of bounds. Two Harrington incomplete passes secured the Lions 13–17 loss.

==== Week 5: vs. Baltimore Ravens ====
Week 5: Baltimore Ravens at Detroit Lions – Game summary

Quarter	1	2	3	4	Total
Ravens	0	10	0	7	17
Lions	14	0	7	14	35

at Ford Field, Detroit, Michigan

- Date: October 9
- Game time: 1:00 p.m. EDT
- Game weather: None (indoor stadium)
- Game attendance: 61,201
- Referee: Mike Carey
- Recap

Game information

First quarter

- DET – Kevin Jones 14-yard run (Jason Hanson kick good), 9:40. Detroit 7–0 Drive: 4 plays, 25 yards, 1:59.
- DET – Kevin Jones 1-yard run (Jason Hanson kick good), 4:40. Detroit 14–0 Drive: 9 plays, 61 yards, 3:18.

Second quarter

- BAL – Jamal Lewis 15-yard pass from Anthony Wright (Matt Stover kick good), 8:14. Detroit 14–7 Drive: 6 plays, 51 yards,. 2:57.
- BAL – Matt Stover 46-yard field goal, 0:00. Detroit 14–10 Drive: 5 plays, 34 yards, 1:18.

Third quarter

- DET – Artose Pinner 1-yard run (Jason Hanson kick good), 1:35. Detroit 21–10 Drive: 18 plays, 73 yards, 9:38.

Fourth quarter

- DET – Casey Fitzsimmons 2-yard pass from Joey Harrington (Jason Hanson kick good), 14:55. Detroit 28–10 Drive: 2 plays, 9 yards, 0:22.
- BAL – Todd Heap 6-yard pass from Anthony Wright (Matt Stover kick good), 8:59. Detroit 28–17 Drive: 11 plays, 89 yards, 5:56.
- DET – Shawn Bryson 77-yard run (Jason Hanson kick good), 7:05. Detroit 35–17 Drive: 3 plays, 82 yards, 1:54.

Top passers

- BAL – Anthony Wright – 20/37, 230 yards, 2 TD, 2 INT
- DET – Joey Harrington – 10/23, 97 yards, TD, 2 INT

Top receivers

- BAL – Derrick Mason – 6 receptions, 65 yards
- DET – Kevin Johnson – 3 receptions, 25 yards

Top rushers

- BAL – Jamal Lewis – 19 rushes, 95 yards
- DET – Shawn Bryson – 1 rush, 77 yards, TD

In Week 5, the Lions hosted the Baltimore Ravens. The Lions received the opening kickoff and immediately punted. However, they would get the ball back after an Anthony Wright interception by Dré Bly. The Lions immediately capitalized and scored on a Kevin Jones 14-yard touchdown run. After forcing the Ravens to punt, the Lions scored again on another Jones run, this time from a yard out, to take the 14–0 lead. The Ravens turned the ball over once again when Ovie Mughelli fumbled on a pass reception which was recovered by Cory Redding. The Lions took their next drive into the second quarter and into Ravens territory, but would turn the ball over on a Harrington interception. The Ravens would give the ball right back on an interception of their own, but the Lions failed to start a drive and punted. The Ravens scored on their next drive with a Wright touchdown pass to Jamal Lewis. The Lions attempt to respond ended with a Harrington interception in Baltimore territory. After two punts, the Ravens kicked a 46-yard field goal as time expired to close the lead at 14–10 heading into the half.

The Ravens moved into Lions territory, and made it down to the 33-yard line, but punted on 4th and 12. The Lions would construct an 18 play, 73 yard drive ending with an Artose Pinner 1-yard rushing touchdown. The Ravens punted on their next drive, and Lions' return man R. W. McQuarters returned the punt 49 yards to Baltimore's 9. The Lions would score in 2 plays with a Harrington pass to Casey FitzSimmons. The Ravens responded with a long touchdown drive of their own, capped off by a Wright 6-yard pass to Todd Heap. On the following drive, Shawn Bryson took the third snap of the drive 77 yards on a touchdown run, extending the Lions lead to 35–17. The Ravens fumbled on their next drive, followed by a Lions punt, then ending the game with a turnover on downs to secure the second win of the season for the Lions. This would be the Lions' last win against the Ravens until 2025. However, this is still their last home game against Baltimore.

==== Week 6: vs. Carolina Panthers ====
Week 6: Carolina Panthers vs. Detroit Lions – Game summary

Quarter	1	2	3	4	Total
Panthers	7	7	0	7	21
Lions	0	14	3	3	20

at Ford Field, Detroit, Michigan

- Date: October 16
- Game time: 1:00 p.m. EDT
- Game weather: None (indoor stadium)
- Game attendance: 61,083
- Referee: Larry Nemmers
- Recap

Game information

First quarter

- CAR – Rod Gardner 4-yard pass from Jake Delhomme (John Kasay kick good), 0:54. Carolina 7–0 Drive: 3 plays, 11 yards, 1:30.

Second quarter

- DET – Boss Bailey 34-yard interception return (Jason Hanson kick good), 14:17. Tied 7–7
- CAR – Steve Smith Sr. 80-yard pass from Jake Delhomme (John Kasay kick good), 14:00. Carolina 14–7 Drive: 1 plays, 80 yards, 0:17.
- DET – Kenoy Kennedy 64-yard interception return (Jason Hanson kick good), 8:28. Tied 14–14

Third quarter

- DET – Jason Hanson 52-yard field goal, 0:40. Detroit 17–14 Drive: 11 plays, 31 yards, 6:09.

Fourth quarter

- DET – Jason Hanson 25-yard field goal, 5:08. Detroit 20–14 Drive: 6 plays, 89 yards, 3:44.
- CAR – Ricky Proehl 3-yard pass from Chris Weinke (John Kasay kick good), 0:32. Carolina 21–20 Drive: 11 plays, 79 yards, 2:41.

Top passers

- CAR – Jake Delhomme – 15/25, 236 yards, 2 TD, 3 INT
- DET – Joey Harrington – 17/28, 201 yards, INT

Top receivers

- CAR – Steve Smith Sr. – 6 receptions, 123 yards, TD
- DET – Marcus Pollard – 3 receptions, 105 yards

Top rushers

- CAR – Stephen Davis – 13 rushes, 27 yards
- DET – Kevin Jones – 12 rushes, 21 yards

==== Week 7: at Cleveland Browns ====
Week 7: Detroit Lions at Cleveland Browns – Game summary

Quarter	1	2	3	4	Total
Lions	0	7	3	3	13
Browns	3	7	0	0	10

at Cleveland Browns Stadium, Cleveland, Ohio

- Date: October 23
- Game time: 1:00 p.m. EDT
- Game weather: Mostly cloudy, 47 °F (8 °C)
- Game attendance: 72,923
- Referee: Walt Coleman
- Recap

Game information

First quarter

- CLE – Phil Dawson 30-yard field goal, 8:30. Cleveland 3–0 Drive: 9 plays, 44 yards, 5:31.

Second quarter

- DET – Jeff Garcia 1-yard run (Jason Hanson kick good), 5:26. Detroit 7–3 Drive: 10 plays, 55 yards, 6:12.
- CLE – Josh Cribbs 90-yard kick return (Phil Dawson kick good), 5:14. Cleveland 10–7

Third quarter

- DET – Jason Hanson 47-yard field goal, 9:29. Tied 10–10 Drive: 8 plays, 29 yards, 3:37.

Fourth quarter

- DET – Jason Hanson 50-yard field goal, 14:07. Detroit 13–10 Drive: 12 plays, 48 yards, 6:07.

Top passers

- DET – Jeff Garcia – 22/34, 210 yards
- CLE – Trent Dilfer – 10/19, 73 yards

Top receivers

- DET – Mike Williams – 5 receptions, 95 yards
- CLE – Braylon Edwards – 3 receptions, 30 yards

Top rushers

- DET – Kevin Jones – 21 rushes, 74 yards
- CLE – Reuben Droughns – 19 rushes, 100 yards

==== Week 8: vs. Chicago Bears ====
Week 8: Chicago Bears vs. Detroit Lions – Game summary

Quarter	1	2	3	4	OT	Total
Bears	0	13	0	0	6	19
Lions	3	0	7	3	0	13

at Ford Field, Detroit, Michigan

- Date: October 30
- Game time: 1:00 p.m. EST/12:00 p.m. CST
- Game weather: None (indoor stadium)
- Game attendance: 61,814
- Referee: Bill Carollo
- Recap

Game information

First quarter

- DET – Jason Hanson 32-yard field goal, 4:11. Detroit 3–0 Drive: 12 plays, 56 yards, 6:09.

Second quarter

- CHI – Muhsin Muhammad 23-yard pass from Kyle Orton (Robbie Gould kick good), 9:29. Chicago 7–3 Drive: 10 plays, 99 yards, 6:02.
- CHI – Robbie Gould 38-yard field goal, 1:51. Chicago 10–3 Drive: 13 plays, 69 yards, 5:57.
- CHI – Robbie Gould 20-yard field goal, 0:17. Chicago 13–3 Drive: 5 plays, 33 yards, 0:53.

Third quarter

- DET – Kevin Jones 6-yard run (Jason Hanson kick good), 3:15. Chicago 13–10 Drive: 12 plays, 85 yards, 6:53.

Fourth quarter

- DET – Jason Hanson 30-yard field goal, 13:20. Tied 13–13 Drive: 8 plays, 52 yards, 3:21.

Overtime

- CHI – Charles Tillman 22-yard interception return, 8:43. Chicago 19–13

Top passers

- CHI – Kyle Orton – 17/31, 230 yards, TD
- DET – Jeff Garcia – 23/35, 197 yards, INT

Top receivers

- CHI – Mark Bradley – 5 receptions, 88 yards
- DET – Scottie Vines – 5 receptions, 61 yards

Top rushers

- CHI – Thomas Jones – 22 rushes, 72 yards
- DET – Kevin Jones – 18 rushes, 66 yards, TD

Despite coming back from a 13–3 deficit after holding the Bears scoreless in the second half, Jeff Garcia ended up throwing a game losing 22-yard pick six to defensive back Charles Tillman. As a result, the Lions were swept by Chicago for the first time since 2001.

==== Week 9: at Minnesota Vikings ====
Week 9: Detroit Lions at Minnesota Vikings – Game summary

Quarter	1	2	3	4	Total
Lions	0	7	0	7	14
Vikings	3	21	0	3	27

at Hubert H. Humphrey Metrodome, Minneapolis, Minnesota

- Date: November 6
- Game time: 1:00 p.m. EST/12:00 p.m. CST
- Game weather: None (indoor stadium)
- Game attendance: 63,813
- Referee: Bill Vinovich
- Recap

Game information

First quarter

- MIN – Paul Edinger 21-yard field goal, 5:55. Minnesota 3–0 Drive: 9 plays, 57 yards, 4:53.

Second quarter

- MIN – Michael Bennett 5-yard pass from Brad Johnson (Paul Edinger kick good), 7:26. Minnesota 10–0 Drive: 9 plays, 44 yards, 4:22.
- MIN – Ciatrick Fason 3-yard run (Paul Edinger kick good), 5:45. Minnesota 17–0 Drive: 3 plays, 14 yards, 1:22.
- MIN – Nate Burleson 15-yard pass from Brad Johnson (Paul Edinger kick good), 4:02. Minnesota 24–0 Drive: 3 plays, 11 yards, 0:53.
- DET – Artose Pinner 1-yard run (Jason Hanson kick good), 0:48. Minnesota 24–7 Drive: 9 plays, 75 yards, 3:14.

Third quarter No scoring plays Fourth quarter

- DET – Marcus Pollard 23-yard pass from Joey Harrington (Jason Hanson kick good), 14:55. Minnesota 24–14 Drive: 6 plays, 67 yards, 2:57.
- MIN – Paul Edinger 40-yard field goal, 7:30. Minnesota 27–14 Drive: 6 plays, 33 yards, 3:32.

Top passers

- DET – Joey Harrington – 28/48, 263 yards, TD, 2 INT
- MIN – Brad Johnson – 15/22, 136 yards, 2 TD

Top receivers

- DET – Scottie Vines – 9 receptions, 109 yards
- MIN – Travis Taylor – 4 receptions, 27 yards

Top rushers

- DET – Joey Harrington – 4 rushes, 17 yards
- MIN – Michael Bennett – 18 rushes, 106 yards

==== Week 10: vs. Arizona Cardinals ====
Week 10: Arizona Cardinals vs. Detroit Lions – Game summary

Quarter	1	2	3	4	Total
Cardinals	0	3	8	10	21
Lions	9	10	7	3	29

at Ford Field, Detroit, Michigan

- Date: November 13
- Game time: 1:00 p.m. EST/11:00 a.m. MST
- Game weather: None (indoor stadium)
- Game attendance: 61,091
- Referee: Scott Green
- Recap

Game information

First quarter

- DET – Roy Williams 7-yard pass from Joey Harrington (Jason Hanson kick good), 11:17. Detroit 7–0 Drive: 7 plays, 59 yards, 3:43.
- DET – Obafemi Ayanbadejo tackled in the endzone by Dan Wilkinson for a safety, 2:46. Detroit 9–0

Second quarter

- DET – Roy Williams 21-yard pass from Joey Harrington (Jason Hanson kick good), 11:13. Detroit 16–0 Drive: 5 plays, 69 yards, 3:21.
- ARI – Neil Rackers 51-yard field goal, 5:33. Detroit 16–3 Drive: 13 plays, 44 yards, 5:40.
- DET – Jason Hanson 26-yard field goal, . Detroit 19–3 Drive: 9 plays, 60 yards, 2:34.

Third quarter

- ARI – J.J. Arrington 1-yard run (Obafemi Ayanbadejo kick good), 9:53. Detroit 19–11 Drive: 9 plays, 79 yards, 5:07.
- DET – Roy Williams 29-yard pass from Joey Harrington (Jason Hanson kick good), 6:03. Detroit 26–11 Drive: 6 plays, 72 yards, 3:50.

Fourth quarter

- ARI – Neil Rackers 28-yard field goal, 14:09. Detroit 26–14 Drive: 9 plays, 67 yards, 3:48.
- DET – Jason Hanson 20-yard field goal, 8:35. Detroit 29–14 Drive: 10 plays, 78 yards, 5:34.
- ARI – Larry Fitzgerald 8-yard pass from Kurt Warner (Neil Rackers kick good), 2:24. Detroit 29–21 Drive: 6 plays, 62 yards, 1:11.

Top passers

- ARI – Kurt Warner – 29/45, 359 yards, TD
- DET – Joey Harrington – 21/31, 231 yards, 3 TD

Top receivers

- ARI – Larry Fitzgerald – 9 receptions, 141 yards, TD
- DET – Roy Williams – 7 receptions, 117 yards, 3 TD

Top rushers

- ARI – J.J. Arrington – 8 rushes, 24 yards, TD
- DET – Kevin Jones – 14 rushes, 81 yards

==== Week 11: at Dallas Cowboys ====
Week 11: Detroit Lions at Dallas Cowboys – Game summary

Quarter	1	2	3	4	Total
Lions	0	7	0	0	7
Cowboys	7	6	7	0	20

at Texas Stadium, Irving, Texas

- Date: November 20
- Game time: 1:00 p.m. EST/12:00 p.m. CST
- Game weather: 57 °F (14 °C)
- Game attendance: 62,670
- Referee: Ed Hochuli
- Recap

Game information

First quarter

- DAL – Marion Barber III 6-yard run (Billy Cundiff kick good), 6:58. Dallas 7–0 Drive: 14 plays, 84 yards, 8:02.

Second quarter

- DAL – Billy Cundiff 19-yard field goal, 6:39. Dallas 10–0 Drive: 13 plays, 89 yards, 6:43.
- DET – Kevin Jones 2-yard run (Jason Hanson kick good), 2:49. Dallas 10–7 Drive: 8 plays, 78 yards, 3:50.
- DAL – Billy Cundiff 56-yard field goal, 0:03. Dallas 13–7 Drive: 5 plays, 4 yards, 0:35.

Third quarter

- DAL – Marion Barber III 4-yard run (Billy Cundiff kick good), 2:21. Dallas 20–7 Drive: 12 plays, 48 yards, 6:03.

Fourth quarter No scoring plays

Top passers

- DET – Joey Harrington – 17/25, 169 yards
- DAL – Drew Bledsoe – 12/23, 110 yards

Top receivers

- DET – Roy Williams – 5 receptions, 72 yards
- DAL – Keyshawn Johnson – 5 receptions, 37 yards

Top rushers

- DET – Kevin Jones – 12 rushes, 29 yards, TD
- DAL – Julius Jones – 21 rushes, 92 yards

==== Week 12: vs. Atlanta Falcons ====
Week 12: Atlanta Falcons vs. Detroit Lions – Game summary

Quarter	1	2	3	4	Total
Falcons	10	7	10	0	27
Lions	0	0	0	7	7

at Ford Field, Detroit, Michigan

- Date: November 24
- Game time: 12:40 p.m. EST
- Game weather: None (indoor stadium)
- Game attendance: 62,390
- Referee: Peter Morelli
- Recap

Game information

First quarter

- ATL – Todd Peterson 21-yard field goal, 10:13. Atlanta 3–0 Drive: 9 plays, 77 yards, 4:47.
- ATL – T.J. Duckett 1-yard run (Todd Peterson kick ), 0:52. Atlanta 10–0 Drive: 8 plays, 42 yards, 4:21.

Second quarter

- ATL – Alge Crumpler 6-yard pass from Michael Vick (Todd Peterson kick good), 10:44. Atlanta 17–0 Drive: 7 plays, 60 yards, 3:37.

Third quarter

- ATL – Alge Crumpler 32-yard pass from Michael Vick (Todd Peterson kick good), 11:46. Atlanta 24–0 Drive: 4 plays, 45 yards, 2:04.
- ATL – Todd Peterson 23-yard field goal, 5:11. Atlanta 27–0 Drive: 11 plays, 46 yards, 5:34.

Fourth quarter

- DET – Roy Williams 31-yard pass from Jeff Garcia (Jason Hanson kick good), 9:18. Atlanta 27–7 Drive: 6 plays, 80 yards, 2:06.

Top passers

- ATL – Michael Vick – 12/22, 146 yards, 2 TD, INT
- DET – Jeff Garcia – 14/24, 154 yards, TD, INT

Top receivers

- ATL – Alge Crumpler – 7 receptions, 104 yards, 2 TD
- DET – Mike Williams – 6 receptions, 84 yards

Top rushers

- ATL – Warrick Dunn – 17 rushes, 116 yards
- DET – Kevin Jones – 4 rushes, 32 yards

==== Week 13: vs. Minnesota Vikings ====
Week 13: Minnesota Vikings vs. Detroit Lions – Game summary

Quarter	1	2	3	4	Total
Vikings	7	7	7	0	21
Lions	3	3	3	7	16

at Ford Field, Detroit, Michigan

- Date: December 4
- Game time: 1:00 p.m. EST/12:00 p.m. CST
- Game weather: None (indoor stadium)
- Game attendance: 61,375
- Referee: Tom White
- Recap

Game information

First quarter

- DET – Jason Hanson 45-yard field goal, 8:06. Detroit 3–0
- MIN – Koren Robinson 80-yard pass from Brad Johnson (Paul Edinger kick good), 7:56. Minnesota 7–3

Second quarter

- MIN – Michael Bennett 7-yard run (Paul Edinger kick good), 13:53. Minnesota 14–3
- DET – Jason Hanson 26-yard field goal, 0:08. Minnesota 14–6

Third quarter

- MIN – Michael Bennett 5-yard pass from Brad Johnson (Paul Edinger kick good), 10:45. Detroit 21–6
- DET – Jason Hanson 28-yard field goal, 1:51. Detroit 21–9

Fourth quarter

- DET – Artose Pinner 6-yard run (Jason Hanson kick good), 7:38. Detroit 21–16

Top passers

- MIN – Brad Johnson – 17/23, 256 yards, 2 TD
- DET – Jeff Garcia – 17/35, 126 yards, INT

Top receivers

- MIN – Koren Robinson – 4 receptions, 148 yards, TD
- DET – Roy Williams – 4 receptions, 34 yards

Top rushers

- MIN – Michael Bennett – 22 rushes, 79 yards, TD
- DET – Artose Pinner – 14 rushes, 64 yards, TD

==== Week 14: at Green Bay Packers ====
Week 14: Detroit Lions at Green Bay Packers – Game summary

Quarter	1	2	3	4	OT	Total
Lions	13	0	0	0	0	13
Packers	3	7	0	3	3	16

at Lambeau Field, Green Bay, Wisconsin

- Date: December 11
- Game time: 8:40 p.m. EST/7:40 p.m. CST
- Game weather: Partly cloudy, 14 °F (−10 °C)
- Game attendance: 70,019
- Referee: Mike Carey
- Recap

Game information

First quarter

- DET – Jason Hanson 19-yard field goal, 11:03. Detroit 3–0 Drive: 8 plays, 67 yards, 3:57.
- DET – Jason Hanson 23-yard field goal, 7:11. Detroit 6–0 Drive: 7 plays, 13 yards, 3:03.
- GNB – Ryan Longwell 36-yard field goal, 2:26. Detroit 6–3 Drive: 9 plays, 47 yards, 4:45.
- DET – Roy Williams 4-yard pass from Jeff Garcia (Jason Hanson kick good), 0:43. Detroit 13–3 Drive: 3 plays, 16 yards, 1:43.

Second quarter

- GNB – Samkon Gado 64-yard run (Ryan Longwell kick good), 4:56. Detroit 13–10 Drive: 3 plays, 77 yards, 1:24.

Third quarter No scoring plays

Fourth quarter

- GNB – Ryan Longwell 39-yard field goal, 14:22. Tied 13–13 Drive: 8 plays, 58 yards, 3:27.

Overtime

- GNB – Ryan Longwell 28-yard field goal, , 9:43. Green Bay 16–13 Drive: 10 plays, 56 yards, 5:17.

Top passers

- DET – Jeff Garcia – 13/24, 112 yards, TD
- GNB – Brett Favre – 21/31, 170 yards, INT

Top receivers

- DET – Roy Williams – 4 receptions, 53 yards
- GNB – David Martin – 5 receptions, 38 yards

Top rushers

- DET – Kevin Jones – 9 rushes, 63 yards
- GNB – Samkon Gado – 29 rushes, 171 yards, TD

==== Week 15: vs. Cincinnati Bengals ====
Week 15: Cincinnati Bengals vs. Detroit Lions – Game summary

Quarter	1	2	3	4	Total
Bengals	17	7	7	10	41
Lions	0	7	3	7	17

at Ford Field, Detroit, Michigan

- Date: December 18
- Game time: 4:05 p.m. EST
- Game weather: None (indoor stadium)
- Game attendance: 61,749
- Referee: Walt Anderson
- Recap

Game information

First quarter

- CIN – Shayne Graham 28-yard field goal, 11:41. Cincinnati 3–0 Drive: 7 plays, 13 yards, 3:09.
- CIN – Kelley Washington 18-yard pass from Carson Palmer (Shayne Graham kick good), 7:52. Cincinnati 10–0 Drive: 7 plays, 68 yards, 2:41.
- CIN – Chad Johnson 1-yard pass from Carson Palmer (Shayne Graham kick good), 2:59. Cincinnati 17–0 Drive: 7 plays, 45 yards, 2:48.

Second quarter

- DET – Roy Williams 5-yard pass from Jeff Garcia (Jason Hanson kick good), 12:42. Cincinnati 17–7 Drive: 9 plays, 74 yards, 5:17.
- CIN – T.J. Houshmandzadeh 7-yard pass from Carson Palmer (Shayne Graham kick good), 9:20. Cincinnati 24–7 Drive: 9 plays, 71 yards, 3:22.

Third quarter

- CIN – Rudi Johnson 4-yard run (Shayne Graham kick good), 9:32. Cincinnati 31–7 Drive: 11 plays, 64 yards, 5:28.
- DET – Jason Hanson 45-yard field goal, 5:22. Cincinnati 31–10 Drive: 9 plays, 38 yards, 4:10.

Fourth quarter

- CIN – Rudi Johnson 16-yard run (Shayne Graham kick good), 11:01. Cincinnati 38–10 Drive: 6 plays, 52 yards, 3:11.
- DET – Charles Rogers 35-yard pass from Joey Harrington (Jason Hanson kick good), 6:44. Cincinnati 38–17 Drive: 7 plays, 69 yards, 4:17.
- CIN – Shayne Graham 33-yard field goal, 1:55. Cincinnati 41–17 Drive: 9 plays, 22 yards, 4:49.

Top passers

- CIN – Carson Palmer – 28/39, 274 yards, 3 TD, 2 INT
- DET – Jeff Garcia – 13/21, 138 yards, TD, 3 INT

Top receivers

- CIN – Chad Johnson – 11 receptions, 99 yards, TD
- DET – Charles Rogers – 3 receptions, 71 yards, TD

Top rushers

- CIN – Rudi Johnson – 24 rushes, 117 yards, 2 TD
- DET – Artose Pinner – 15 rushes, 55 yards

==== Week 16: at New Orleans Saints ====
Week 16: Detroit Lions at New Orleans Saints – Game summary

Quarter	1	2	3	4	Total
Lions	0	7	0	6	13
Saints	0	3	6	3	12

at Alamo Dome, San Antonio, Texas

- Date: December 24
- Game time: 1:00 p.m. EST/12:00 p.m. CST
- Game weather: None (indoor stadium)
- Game attendance: 63,747
- Referee: Larry Nemmers
- Recap

Game information

First quarter No scoring plays Second quarter

- DET – Shaun Rogers 21-yard defensive fumble return (Jason Hanson kick good), 5:45. Detroit 7–0
- NOR – John Carney 35-yard field goal, 1:04. Detroit 7–3 Drive: 12 plays, 67 yards, 4:41.

Third quarter

- NOR – John Carney 47-yard field goal, 9:16. Detroit 7–6 Drive: 12 plays, 59 yards, 5:44.
- NOR – John Carney 33-yard field goal, 5:49. New Orleans 9–7 Drive: 4 plays, 6 yards, 1:38.

Fourth quarter

- DET – Jason Hanson 21-yard field goal, 7:14. Detroit 10–9 Drive: 11 plays, 89 yards, 6:47.
- NOR – John Carney 20-yard field goal, 1:52. New Orleans 12–10 Drive: 17 plays, 70 yards, 5:22.
- DET – Jason Hanson 39-yard field goal, 0:00. Detroit 13–12 Drive: 9 plays, 60 yards, 1:52.

Top passers

- DET – Joey Harrington – 17/30, 210 yards, INT
- NOR – Todd Bouman – 21/38, 233 yards

Top receivers

- DET – Roy Williams – 4 receptions, 111 yards
- NOR – Zach Hilton – 7 receptions, 83 yards

Top rushers

- DET – Artose Pinner – 20 rushes, 57 yards
- NOR – Antowain Smith – 13 rushes, 33 yards

==== Week 17: at Pittsburgh Steelers ====
Week 17: Detroit Lions at Pittsburgh Steelers – Game summary

Quarter	1	2	3	4	Total
Lions	14	0	7	0	21
Steelers	14	7	14	0	35

at Heinz Field, Pittsburgh, Pennsylvania

- Date: January 1
- Game time: 1:00 p.m. EST/12:00 p.m. CST
- Game weather: Cloudy, 39 °F (4 °C)
- Game attendance: 63,794
- Referee: Walt Coleman
- Recap

Game information

First quarter

- PIT – Antwaan Randle El 81-yard punt return (Jeff Reed kick good), 13:43. Pittsburgh 7–0
- DET – Marcus Pollard 11-yard pass from Joey Harrington (Jason Hanson kick good), 9:43. Tied 7–7 Drive: 8 plays, 59 yards, 4:00.
- DET – Cory Schlesinger 1-yard pass from Joey Harrington (Jason Hanson kick good), 3:33. Detroit 14–7 Drive: 7 plays, 81 yards, 3:46.
- PIT – Jerome Bettis 1-yard run (Jeff Reed kick good), 0:21. Tied 14–14 Drive: 6 plays, 33 yards, 3:12.

Second quarter

- PIT – Jerome Bettis 5-yard run (Jeff Reed kick good), 1:11. Pittsburgh 21–14 Drive: 4 plays, 37 yards, 1:24.

Third quarter

- PIT – Jerome Bettis 4-yard run (Jeff Reed kick good), 11:00. Pittsburgh 28–14 Drive: 7 plays, 77 yards, 4:00.
- DET – Roy Williams 15-yard pass from Joey Harrington (Jason Hanson kick good), 5:32. Pittsburgh 28–21 Drive: 12 plays, 63 yards, 5:28.
- PIT – Ben Roethlisberger 7-yard run (Jeff Reed kick good), 0:42. Pittsburgh 35–21 Drive: 8 plays, 82 yards, 4:50.

Fourth quarter No scoring plays

Top passers

- DET – Joey Harrington – 17/33, 212 yards, 3 TD
- PIT – Ben Roethlisberger – 7/16, 135 yards, 2 INT

Top receivers

- DET – Shawn Bryson – 1 reception, 63 yards
- PIT – Heath Miller – 3 receptions, 62 yards

Top rushers

- DET – Kevin Jones – 18 rushes, 78 yards
- PIT – Willie Parker – 26 rushes, 135 yards

=== Standings ===
==== Division ====
NFC North
	W	L	T	PCT	DIV	CONF	PF	PA	STK
^{(2)} Chicago Bears	11	5	0	.688	5–1	10–2	260	202	L1
Minnesota Vikings	9	7	0	.563	5–1	8–4	306	344	W1
Detroit Lions	5	11	0	.313	1–5	3–9	254	345	L1
Green Bay Packers	4	12	0	.250	1–5	4–8	298	344	W1

==== Conference ====
NFC
#	Team	Division	W	L	T	PCT	DIV	CONF	SOS	SOV	STK
Division leaders
1	Seattle Seahawks	West	13	3	0	.813	6–0	10–2	.430	.404	L1
2 (Note: Chicago clinched the #2 seed over Tampa Bay and NY Giants based on conference record. Division tie break was initially used to eliminate Carolina (see below).)	Chicago Bears	North	11	5	0	.688	5–1	10–2	.457	.398	L1
3 (Note: Tampa Bay clinched the NFC South over Carolina based on division record.) (Note: Tampa Bay finished ahead of NY Giants based on conference record, claiming the #3 seed.)	Tampa Bay Buccaneers	South	11	5	0	.688	5–1	9–3	.449	.426	W2
4	New York Giants	East	11	5	0	.688	4–2	8–4	.492	.432	W1
Wild cards
5	Carolina Panthers	South	11	5	0	.688	4–2	8–4	.449	.409	W1
6	Washington Redskins	East	10	6	0	.625	5–1	10–2	.539	.500	W5
Did not qualify for the postseason
7 (Note: Minnesota finished ahead of Dallas based on conference record.)	Minnesota Vikings	North	9	7	0	.563	5–1	8–4	.484	.382	W1
8	Dallas Cowboys	East	9	7	0	.563	3–3	7–5	.523	.465	L1
9	Atlanta Falcons	South	8	8	0	.500	2–4	5–7	.492	.344	L3
10 (Note: Philadelphia finished ahead of St. Louis based on head-to-head victory.)	Philadelphia Eagles	East	6	10	0	.375	0–6	3–9	.531	.385	L2
11	St. Louis Rams	West	6	10	0	.375	1–5	3–9	.484	.365	W1
12 (Note: Detroit finished ahead of Arizona based on head-to-head victory.)	Detroit Lions	North	5	11	0	.313	1–5	3–9	.504	.300	L1
13	Arizona Cardinals	West	5	11	0	.313	3–3	4–8	.508	.300	L1
14 (Note: Green Bay finished ahead of San Francisco based on conference record.)	Green Bay Packers	North	4	12	0	.250	1–5	4–8	.531	.453	W1
15	San Francisco 49ers	West	4	12	0	.250	2–4	3–9	.539	.391	W2
16	New Orleans Saints	South	3	13	0	.188	1–5	1–11	.523	.417	L5
Tiebreakers (Note: When breaking ties for three or more teams under the NFL's rules, they are first broken within divisions, then comparing only the highest-ranked remaining team from each division.)
