= Kevin Jones (American football) =

American football player (born 1982)

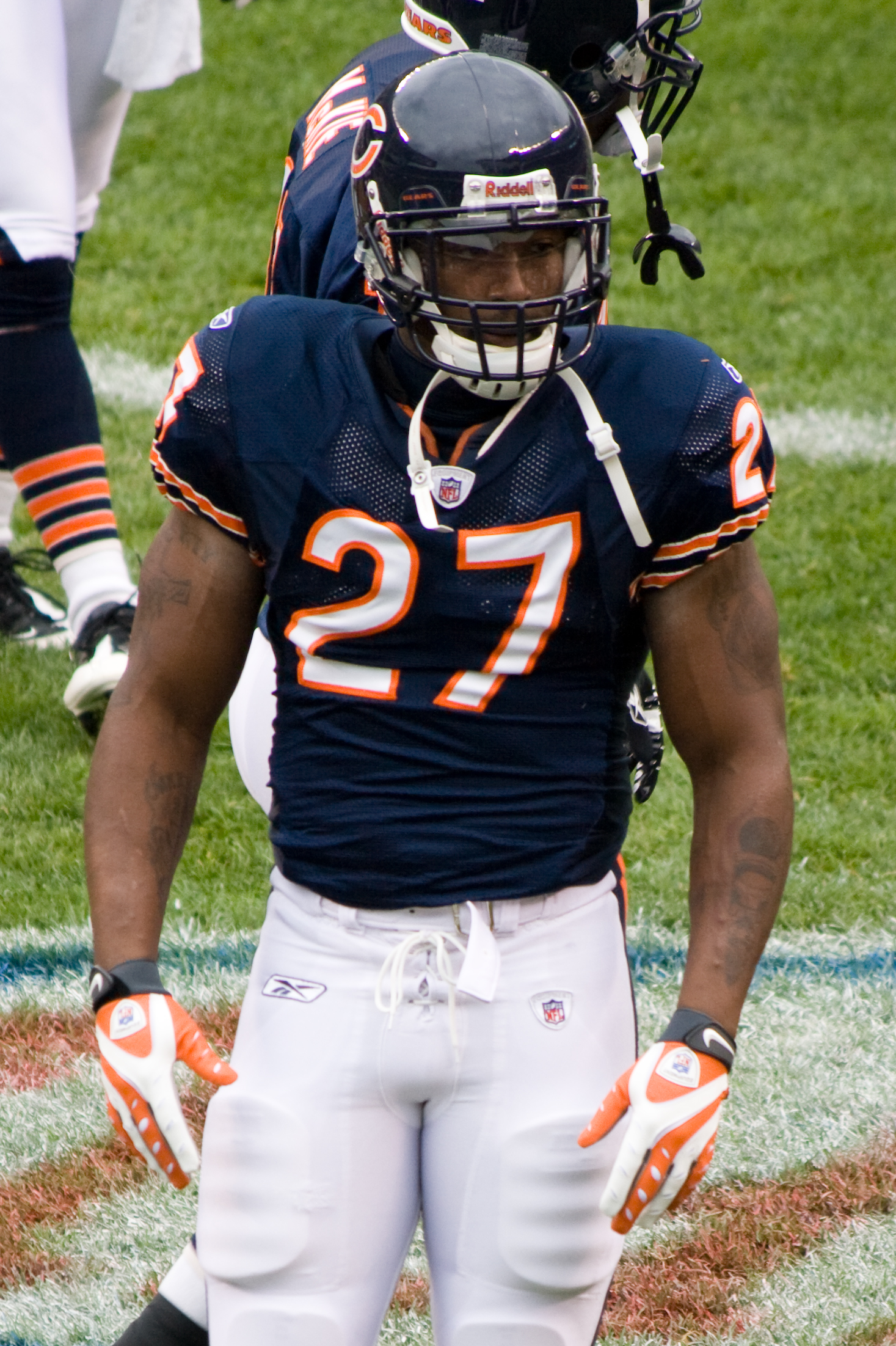
- Jones with the Chicago Bears in 2008

No. 34, 27, 25
- Position: Running back

Personal information
- Born: August 21, 1982 (age 44); Chester, Pennsylvania, U.S.
- Listed height: 6 ft 0 in (1.83 m)
- Listed weight: 225 lb (102 kg)

Career information
- High school: Cardinal O'Hara (Springfield, Pennsylvania)
- College: Virginia Tech (2000–2003)
- NFL draft: 2004: 1st round, 30th overall pick

Career history
- Detroit Lions (2004–2007); Chicago Bears (2008–2009); Hartford Colonials (2010)

Awards and highlights
- PFWA All-Rookie Team (2004); Consensus All-American (2003); First-team All-Big East (2003); Dudley Award (2003)

Career NFL statistics
- Rushing attempts: 795
- Rushing yards: 3,176
- Rushing touchdowns: 24
- Receptions: 143
- Receiving yards: 1,011
- Receiving touchdowns: 3
- Stats at Pro Football Reference

Kevin S. Jones (born August 21, 1982) is an American former professional football player who was a running back in the National Football League (NFL). He played college football for the Virginia Tech Hokies, earning consensus All-American honors in 2003. Jones was selected in the first round of the 2004 NFL draft. He played in the NFL for six seasons from 2004 to 2009 with the Detroit Lions and Chicago Bears.

== Early life ==
=== High school ===
Jones was born in Chester, Pennsylvania. With his natural ability and his father's training regimen, he became a highly conditioned athlete at a very young age. Jones was a multi-sport athlete in high school (1997–2001) and competed at the varsity level as a freshman at Cardinal O'Hara High School in Springfield Township, Delaware County, Pennsylvania.

==== Track and field ====
Jones was a star track and field athlete, excelling in the 60 meters (6.79 sec), 100 meters (10.59 sec), long jump (6.92 m) and triple jump (14.57 m).

==== Football ====
O'Hara Head football coach, George Stratts reluctantly started Jones as a freshman. Jones had immediate success on the field and was a four-year starter, breaking many school records. As a senior, he led his team to a Philadelphia Catholic League Championship and became the Catholic League's all-time leading rusher.

Jones is the inaugural winner of the U.S. Army Player of the Year Award, named the "Hall Trophy", which is presented to the best high school football player in the country. Other notable recipients of the award include: Adrian Peterson, Jimmy Clausen, and Terrelle Pryor.

==== College reveal ====
In 2000, Jones was the No.1 overall recruit in the nation. Courted by many colleges, Kevin narrowed had his choices to Penn State and Virginia Tech. To the surprise of many, Jones chose to become a Hokie, making his decision the day after a home visit from Virginia Tech Head Coach, Frank Beamer.

Jones said of his decision, "If you're a blue-chipper from Pennsylvania, you go to Penn State. But I've always been a little contrary. On the day of my press conference, I still hadn't decided between Virginia Tech and PSU. As I sat down in front of everybody, I had both jerseys with me. I pulled the Penn State jersey out of a bag and said, "I will ... not be attending Penn State." Then I ripped off my sweater and had a Mike Vick jersey on underneath. The entire room was flabbergasted."

Jones' college reveal was so highly anticipated that it was covered nationally, and televised by several local news stations. Since then, the use of props (hats, shirts, gear, music etc.) by recruits to announce their college choice has become a staple of the recruiting experience. The phenomenon can be credited to Jones, who was the first to ever do so with his reveal in 2000.

== College career ==
Jones played for Virginia Tech and Hall of Fame coach Frank Beamer, from 2000 to 2003. He is the highest rated recruit to ever commit to the Virginia Tech football program. During his freshman season, Jones assumed the starting job, after an injury to starter, Lee Suggs. Jones set a school record for rushing yards for a freshman. In 2002, Suggs and Jones split time at tailback, and were together called "The Untouchables" as a result of a fan contest for giving the duo a nickname.

Kevin finished his college career with 3,475 yards and 35 touchdowns on 616 carries (an average of 5.6 yards per carry), and 24 receptions for 229 yards (an average of 9.5 yards per reception). His 3,475 rushing yards and 35 touchdowns both rank second on the school's career-record list. He was elected to the Virginia Tech Sports Hall of Fame in 2016.

== Professional career ==
Pre-draft measurables
Height	Weight	Arm length	Hand span	Vertical jump	Broad jump
6 ft 0 1/8 in (1.83 m)	227 lb (103 kg)	30 7/8 in (0.78 m)	8 5/8 in (0.22 m)	38.0 in (0.97 m)	10 ft 0 in (3.05 m)
All values from NFL Combine

=== Detroit Lions ===
Jones had a successful rookie season with the Detroit Lions and became only the third running back in franchise history to rush for over 1,000 yards in his rookie season, joining the ranks of Billy Sims and Hall of Famer Barry Sanders. He was sidelined at the end of the 2006 season with a foot injury.

In 2007, Jones began the season in a backup role. He became the starter in Week 7 against the Tampa Bay Buccaneers. He rushed for 105 yards on 23 carries and one touchdown in a Week 8 victory over the division rival Chicago Bears. However, he suffered another season-ending injury. On March 13, 2008, the Lions released Jones.

=== Chicago Bears ===
On July 15, 2008, Jones signed a one-year, $605,000 contract with the Chicago Bears.

He was re-signed to a two-year contract worth approximately $3.5 million on March 6, 2009. The deal includes a $1 million bonus and $2 million in the first season. He was intended to be the primary backup to Matt Forte. On September 3, 2009, Jones was injured during a preseason game when he was hit out of bounds by Cleveland Browns linebacker Marcus Benard. He was out for the 2009 season with torn ligaments in his left ankle.

Jones was released on March 9, 2010, after the Bears signed Chester Taylor during the free agency period.

=== Hartford Colonials ===
On September 27, 2010, Jones signed with the Hartford Colonials of the UFL. In his only season with the Colonials, Jones played in two games where he rushed for 41 yards on 16 carries before being placed on injured reserve on October 21, 2010.

== Career statistics ==
=== NFL ===
Legend
**Bold**	Career high

Year	Team	Games		Rushing					Receiving				
Year	Team	GP	GS	Att	Yds	Avg	Lng	TD	Rec	Yds	Avg	Lng	TD
2004	DET	**15**	**14**	**241**	**1,133**	**4.7**	**74**	5	28	180	6.4	**34**	1
2005	DET	13	13	186	664	3.6	40	5	20	109	5.5	28	0
2006	DET	12	12	181	689	3.8	52	6	**61**	**520**	**8.5**	26	**2**
2007	DET	13	10	153	581	3.8	34	**8**	32	197	6.2	16	0
2008	CHI	11	0	34	109	3.2	16	0	2	5	2.5	3	0
Career		64	49	795	3,176	4.0	74	24	143	1,011	7.1	34	3

=== College ===
- 2001: 175 carries for 957 yards (5.47) and 5 TD. 6 catches for 47 yards.
- 2002: 160 carries for 871 yards (5.44) and 9 TD. 4 catches for 21 yards.
- 2003: 281 carries for 1647 yards (5.86) and 21 TD. 14 catches for 161 yards.

== Personal ==
Jones retired from football in 2011 and returned to Virginia Tech as a student later that year to study industrial design in the College of Architecture and Urban Studies. He graduated with a bachelor's degree in industrial design in 2014.

While interning at a furniture design company in Switzerland, Jones manned the position of "grinder" as the only American in a 22-man crew aboard the 68 ft. racing yacht, Caol ila R. By the summer of 2014, Jones had worked five races with the team.

In 2014, Virginia Tech hired Jones as "Special Assistant to the Athletic Director". Jones stepped down from the position on June 12, 2016.

In 2015, Jones co-founded the design firm Void Design Haus in Blacksburg, Virginia, with Alex Barrette. They changed the company name to JoBa in 2016, as a combination of their last names.

On June 3, 2019, the Tampa Bay Buccaneers introduced Jones as a Bill Walsh Coaching Fellow, in a running backs coaching position role for the 2019 Mini-Camp.
