= André Goodman =

American football player (born 1978)

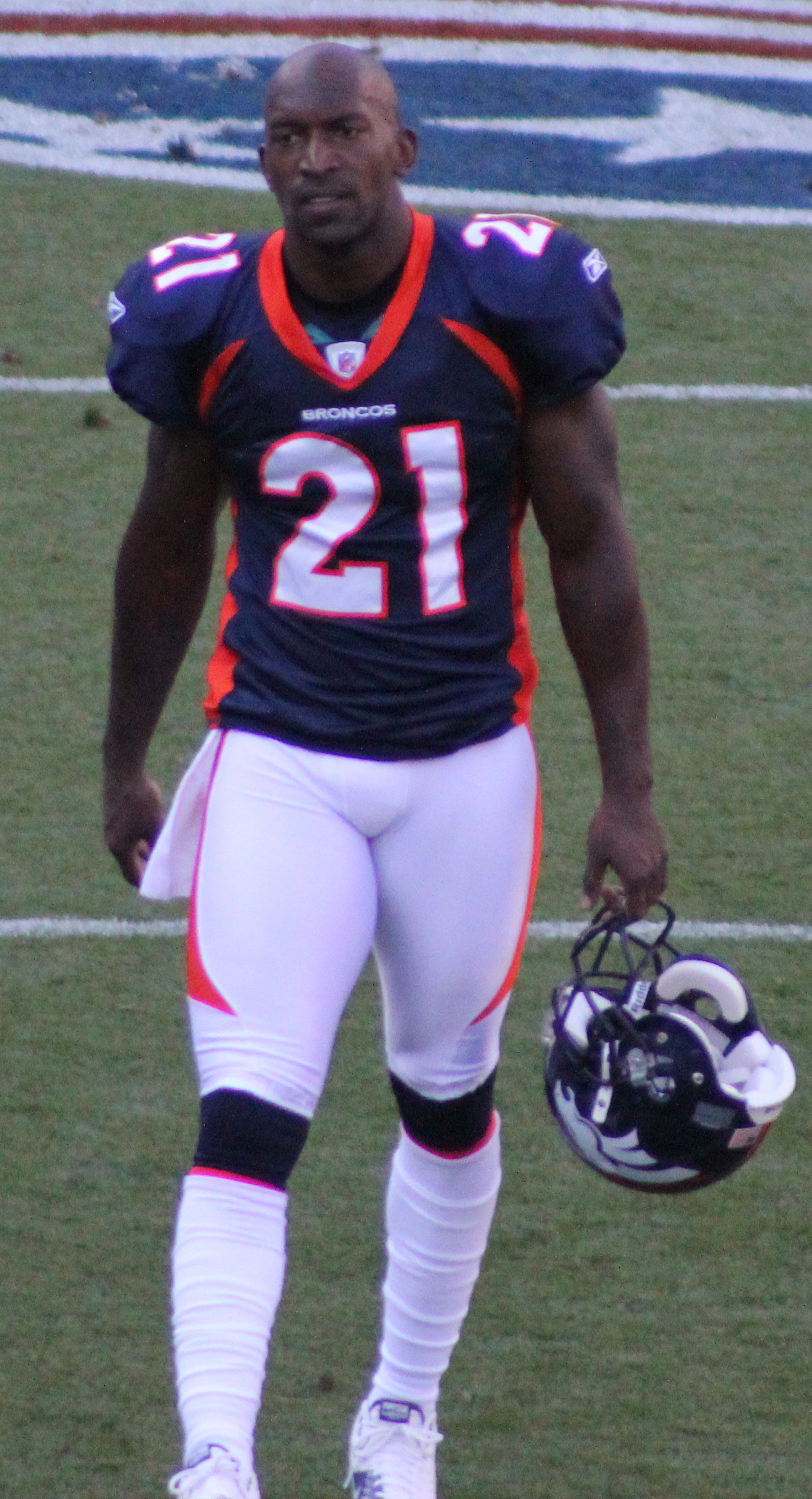
- Goodman with the Denver Broncos in 2011

No. 35, 29, 21
- Position: Cornerback

Personal information
- Born: August 11, 1978 (age 48); Greenville, South Carolina, U.S.
- Listed height: 5 ft 10 in (1.78 m)
- Listed weight: 185 lb (84 kg)

Career information
- High school: Taylors (SC) Eastside
- College: South Carolina
- NFL draft: 2002: 3rd round, 68th overall pick

Career history
- Detroit Lions (2002–2005); Miami Dolphins (2006–2008); Denver Broncos (2009–2011)

Career NFL statistics
- Total tackles: 344
- Sacks: 1
- Forced fumbles: 3
- Fumble recoveries: 8
- Interceptions: 19
- Defensive touchdowns: 2
- Stats at Pro Football Reference

André Goodman (born August 11, 1978) is an American former professional football player who was a cornerback in the National Football League (NFL). He was selected by the Detroit Lions in the third round, third pick of the 2002 NFL draft. He played college football for the South Carolina Gamecocks. Goodman also played for the Miami Dolphins and Denver Broncos.

== Early life ==
Goodman was an all-state wide receiver and defensive back at Eastside High School in Taylors, South Carolina. He was rated the No. 20 prospect by Super Prep during his senior season and was rated the No. 10 receiver in the Atlantic Coast region by Prep Star.

Goodman also excelled in track, setting personal bests of 10.5 seconds in the 100 meters and 22.4 in the 200 meters.

== College career ==
Goodman was a four-year letterman from 1998 to 2001 at the University of South Carolina, where he started the final two seasons for the Gamecocks. During his collegiate career, Goodman totaled 86 tackles, four interceptions and 20 pass break-ups.

As a junior in 2000, Goodman started the first two games at free safety before moving to left cornerback. He registered 35 tackles (28 solo), returned an interception 71 yards and ranked second on the team with 11 pass deflections. In 2001, Goodman started the first eight games and final three games, including the Outback Bowl, at left cornerback as a senior. In the year, he amassed 43 tackles (36 solo), eight pass deflections and was tied for the team high with three interceptions.

== Professional career ==
=== Pre-draft ===
Prior to the 2002 NFL draft, Goodman ran a 4.36 40-yard dash.

=== Detroit Lions ===
Goodman was selected by the Detroit Lions in the third round (68th overall) of the 2002 NFL draft.

As a rookie in 2002, Goodman appeared in 14 regular season games including six starts. He missed the team's first two games with an ankle injury. On the year, he had 48 tackles, an interception, 12 passes defensed, a fumble recovery and six special team tackles. He saw his first regular season against the Green Bay Packers on September 22, finishing with four tackles. He had a pass breakup in the end zone and five solo tackles, including one for a loss, in his first career start against the New Orleans Saints the following week. Against the Packers on November 10, Goodman registered two pass breakups and five tackles (four solo) before being forced out of the game with a thumb injury. The injury would force him to wear a cast on his right hand for the rest of the season. Nevertheless, during season finale against the Minnesota Vikings on December 29, Goodman had a career-high nine tackles and also recorded his first career interception on a pass from quarterback Daunte Culpepper.

Goodman started all three games in which he played in 2003, recording 13 tackles and four passes defensed. He suffered a dislocated shoulder against the Minnesota Vikings on September 21, and was placed on season-ending Injured Reserve four days later.

In 2004, Goodman started four of the 11 games in which he played. In the season, he had 23 tackles, an interception, three passes defensed and a forced fumble. He recorded his lone interception in the season opener against the Chicago Bears on September 12, picking off a Rex Grossman pass. However, he also suffered a thigh injury during the game and missed the following five contests. He started the final four games of the season filling in for injured cornerback Fernando Bryant, and recorded five tackles and a forced fumble against the Bears on December 26.

Goodman played in 15 games with eight starts for the Lions in 2005. He had 47 tackles and a career-high three interceptions, a figure which ranked second on the club, and also came up with a fumble recovery, 12 passes defensed and a five special teams tackles. He had a season-high six tackles on four occasions, all within the first two months of the regular season. His first interception of the year came in a 13–10 win over the Cleveland Browns on October 23, when he picked off a Trent Dilfer pass in the fourth quarter to help preserve the victory. Against the Cincinnati Bengals on December 18, he intercepted a Carson Palmer pass and returned it a career-long 21 yards. He intercepted a Ben Roethlisberger throw in the season finale against the Pittsburgh Steelers on January 1, 2006.

=== Miami Dolphins ===
After his rookie contract with the Lions expired following the 2005 season, Goodman became an unrestricted free agent. He visited with the Miami Dolphins on March 11 and officially signed with the team on March 13.

Ankle and knee injuries to Dolphins cornerback Travis Daniels allowed Goodman to see significant playing time throughout the season. Goodman started 13 of the 15 games in which he appeared in 2006, accumulating 41 tackles (26 solo), a forced fumble, two fumble recoveries and nine passes defensed. He recovered a Bo Scaife fumble against the Tennessee Titans on September 24 and Justin Gage fumble against the Chicago Bears on November 5. His lone forced fumble came against running back Maurice Jones-Drew and the Jacksonville Jaguars on December 3.

While he did not nab an interception on the year and the Dolphins' secondary struggled as a unit, Goodman was the team's most consistent downfield cover corner in 2006. He suffered a shoulder injury against the New York Jets on December 25, and was placed on season-ending Injured Reserve the following day. It would be the second time during the season a shoulder injury had permanently forced him out of a contest against the rival Jets, with the first such occasion taking place more than two months prior on October 15.

After the 2006 season, Goodman switched jersey numbers with fellow cornerback Travis Daniels. Goodman, who had worn No. 29 during his first season with the Dolphins, switched to No. 21 while Daniels took No. 29.

Goodman's shoulder problems from the previous year plagued him during the 2007 offseason. He underwent arthroscopic debridement on his left shoulder on January 18. After being unable to participate in the team's first May minicamp, Goodman underwent further tests and had more surgery on the shoulder on May 11. On July 23, he was placed on the Physically Unable to Perform list. He finished the season with 20 tackles and two interceptions in 13 games (four starts).

Goodman started all 16 games for the Dolphins in 2008, leading the team and setting a career high with five interceptions. He also recorded 39 tackles and a career-high 19 pass deflections during the season.

=== Denver Broncos ===
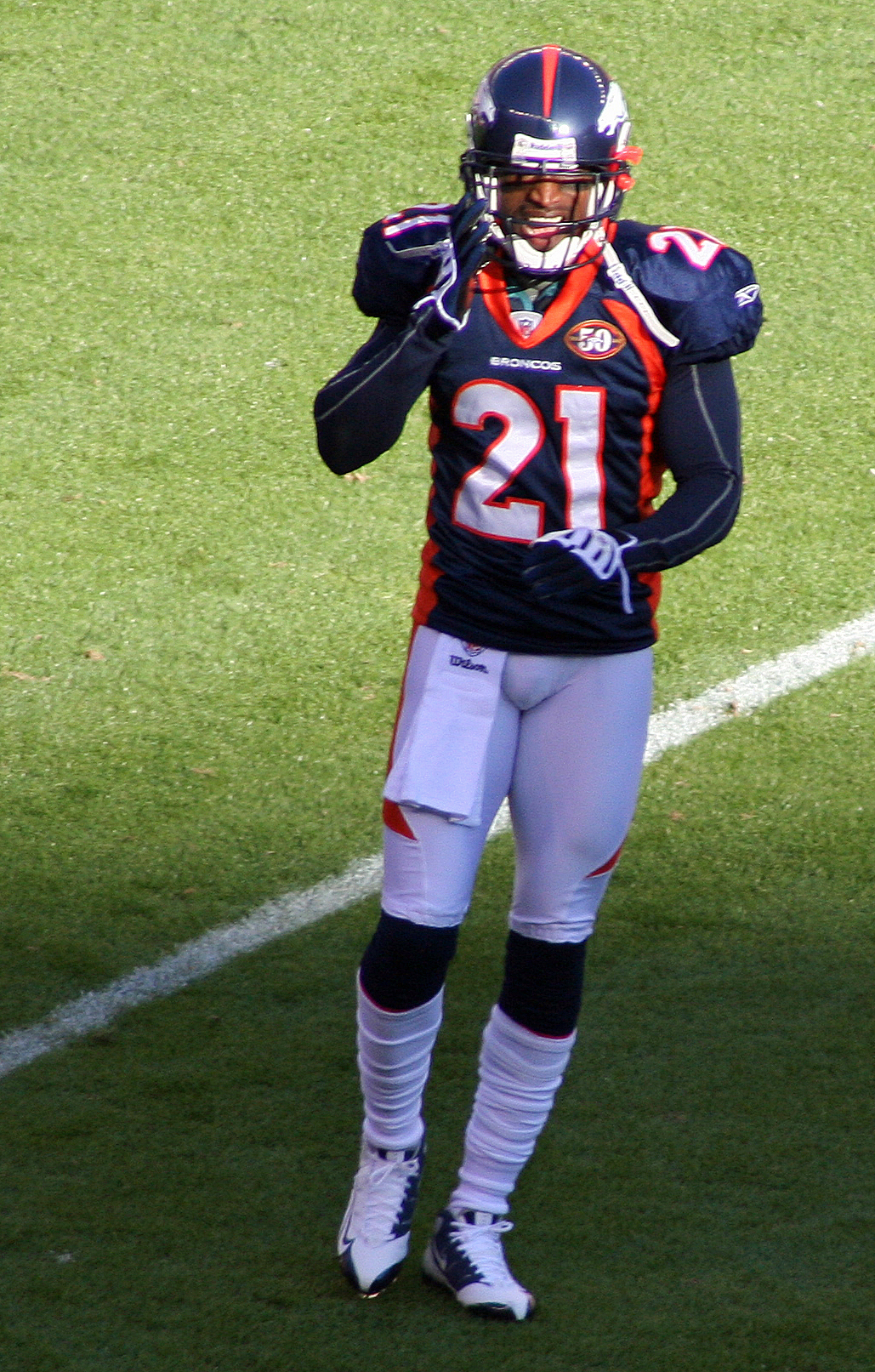
Goodman with the Broncos in 2009

On March 1, 2009, Goodman signed a five-year, $20.4 million contract with the Denver Broncos. The deal included $9.8 million guaranteed and Goodman having the potential to earn an additional $4.8 million if he played 75% of the defensive snaps. In 2009, Goodman had 44 tackles, and 5 interceptions, 1 sack, and a fumble recovery ran back for 30 yards into the end zone. On April 13, 2012, Goodman was released by the Denver Broncos.

== NFL career statistics ==
Legend
	Led the league
**Bold**	Career high

=== Regular season ===
Year	Team	Games		Tackles					Interceptions					Fumbles			
Year	Team	GP	GS	Cmb	Solo	Ast	Sck	TFL	Int	Yds	TD	Lng	PD	FF	FR	Yds	TD
2002	DET	14	6	46	38	8	0.0	2	1	2	0	2	13	0	1	20	0
2003	DET	3	3	11	11	0	0.0	0	0	0	0	0	2	0	0	0	0
2004	DET	11	4	29	24	5	0.0	0	1	0	0	0	2	**1**	0	0	0
2005	DET	15	8	47	**42**	5	0.0	0	3	17	0	21	11	0	1	15	0
2006	MIA	15	14	42	27	**15**	0.0	2	0	0	0	0	9	**1**	**2**	**64**	0
2007	MIA	13	4	20	15	5	0.0	0	2	23	0	18	4	0	0	0	0
2008	MIA	**16**	**16**	39	33	6	0.0	**3**	**5**	53	0	**55**	**19**	**1**	1	0	0
2009	DEN	**16**	**16**	44	40	4	**1.0**	1	**5**	**65**	0	30	17	0	1	30	**1**
2010	DEN	8	8	17	17	0	0.0	0	0	0	0	0	8	0	0	0	0
2011	DEN	**16**	**16**	**49**	41	8	0.0	1	2	46	**1**	26	10	0	**2**	0	0
		127	95	344	288	56	1.0	9	19	206	1	55	95	3	8	129	1

=== Playoffs ===
Year	Team	Games		Tackles					Interceptions					Fumbles			
Year	Team	GP	GS	Cmb	Solo	Ast	Sck	TFL	Int	Yds	TD	Lng	PD	FF	FR	Yds	TD
2008	MIA	1	1	1	1	0	0.0	0	0	0	0	0	0	0	0	0	0
2011	DEN	**2**	**2**	**5**	**5**	0	0.0	0	0	0	0	0	0	0	0	0	0
		3	3	6	6	0	0.0	0	0	0	0	0	0	0	0	0	0

== Post-football career ==
Goodman was director of football development at the University of South Carolina.

== Personal ==
His son, Fabian, will be walking on to the University of South Carolina as a member of the 2020 football recruiting class.
