= Kalimba Edwards =

American football player (born 1979)

No. 98, 58
- Position: Defensive end

Personal information
- Born: December 26, 1979 (age 46); Atlanta, Georgia, U.S.
- Listed height: 6 ft 6 in (1.98 m)
- Listed weight: 265 lb (120 kg)

Career information
- High school: East Point (GA) Tri-Cities
- College: South Carolina (1998-2001)
- NFL draft: 2002: 2nd round, 35th overall pick

Career history
- Detroit Lions (2002–2007); Oakland Raiders (2008)

Awards and highlights
- First-team All-American (2001); Third-team All-American (2000); 2× First-team All-SEC (2000, 2001)

Career NFL statistics
- Total tackles: 212
- Sacks: 31
- Forced fumbles: 10
- Fumble recoveries: 10
- Pass deflections: 11
- Stats at Pro Football Reference

Kalimba Edwards (born December 26, 1979) is an American former professional football player who was a defensive end in the National Football League (NFL). He played college football for the South Carolina Gamecocks and was selected by the Detroit Lions in the second round of the 2002 NFL draft.

Edwards also played for the Oakland Raiders.

== College career ==
Edwards played college football at South Carolina. During his sophomore year, he started every game at defensive end, recording 64 tackles and five sacks, earning an All-American selection. During his junior year, he moved to linebacker and finished third on the team in tackles with 74 and tied for the lead in sacks with seven. He also earned All-American third-team selection by the Associated Press and was a consensus All-Southeastern Conference first-team choice. During his senior year, he played both linebacker and defensive end and was a semifinalist for both the Lombardi Trophy and Butkus Award after finishing the season with 79 tackles and 3.5 sacks. He also earned an All-SEC first-team selection during his senior year.

== Professional career ==
Pre-draft measurables
Height	Weight
6 ft 5 3/8 in (1.97 m)	265 lb (120 kg)
Values from NFL Combine

=== Detroit Lions ===
Edwards was selected by the Detroit Lions in the second round of the 2002 NFL draft. During his rookie year he played in all 16 games and led the team in sacks with 6.5. In 2005, he led the Lions in sacks for the second time with seven. The Lions released him on March 13, 2008. He finished his career with the Lions with 160 tackles and 26 sacks.

=== Oakland Raiders ===
On March 28, 2008, Edwards was signed by the Oakland Raiders to a two-year, $5 million contract.

On February 20, 2009, Edwards was released by the Raiders. He finished his only season with the team starting 11 of 14 games, recording 48 tackles and five sacks.

== NFL career statistics ==
Legend
**Bold**	Career high

Year	Team	Games		Tackles					Interceptions					Fumbles			
Year	Team	GP	GS	Cmb	Solo	Ast	Sck	TFL	Int	Yds	TD	Lng	PD	FF	FR	Yds	TD
2002	DET	**16**	4	40	30	10	6.5	5	0	0	0	0	**4**	**2**	1	0	0
2003	DET	15	0	16	15	1	2.0	2	0	0	0	0	3	0	0	0	0
2004	DET	**16**	0	22	18	4	4.5	2	0	0	0	0	1	**2**	1	0	0
2005	DET	**16**	2	32	25	7	**7.0**	7	0	0	0	0	2	**2**	**3**	**10**	0
2006	DET	**16**	10	37	25	**12**	3.0	4	0	0	0	0	1	1	**3**	3	0
2007	DET	8	6	17	13	4	3.0	3	0	0	0	0	0	**2**	1	0	0
2008	OAK	14	**11**	**48**	**41**	7	5.0	**8**	0	0	0	0	0	1	1	0	0
Career		101	33	212	167	45	31.0	31	0	0	0	0	11	10	10	13	0
