= Fred Graves =

American football player and coach (born 1950)

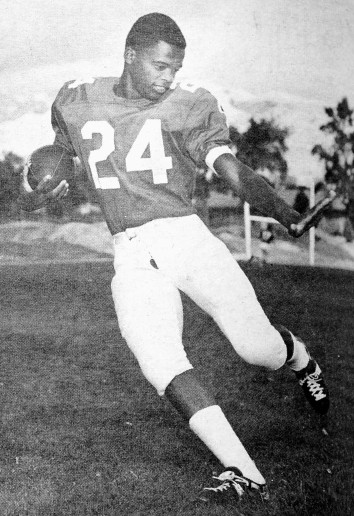
- Graves, circa 1968

Profile
- Position: Wide receiver

Personal information
- Born: March 2, 1950 (age 76); Los Angeles, California, U.S.

Career information
- College: Utah

Career history
- 1975–1976: NE Missouri State (WR, TE)
- 1977–1978: Western Illinois (WR, TE)
- 1979–1981: New Mexico State (WR, TE)
- 1982–1989: Utah (WR)
- 1990: Utah (RB)
- 1991–1993: Utah (WR)
- 1994: Utah (AHC, WR)
- 1995–1997: Utah (OC)
- 1998–2000: Utah (AHC, WR)
- 2001–2003: Buffalo Bills (WR)
- 2004: Cleveland Browns (WR)
- 2005: Detroit Lions (WR)
- 2007–2010: Tennessee Titans (WR)
- 2011–2012: Carolina Panthers (WR)
- 2013–2015: San Diego Chargers (WR)
- 2016: San Diego Chargers (senior offensive assistant)

Fred Graves (born March 2, 1950) is an American football coach, primarily a coach of wide receivers in the National Football League (NFL). He was previously employed by the San Diego Chargers, Carolina Panthers, Tennessee Titans, Detroit Lions, Cleveland Browns, and Buffalo Bills. Earlier, he coached at several universities.

== Playing career ==
Graves was a running back and wide receiver at the University of Utah from 1969 to 1971. As a senior, he led the team with 45 receptions.

== Coaching career ==
Graves' coaching career began at Northeast Missouri State where he served as the wide receivers and tight ends coach from 1975 to 1976. He later moved on to Western Illinois University and New Mexico State University where he held the same position. In 1982, Graves returned to Utah, his alma mater, and for the next eighteen years he served in a variety of positions including wide receivers coach, running backs coach, offensive coordinator, and assistant head coach.

In 2001, Graves went to the NFL to be the wide receivers coach for the Buffalo Bills for three season, then for a season with the Cleveland Browns in 2004. He went to the Detroit Lions in 2005 for two years, then joined head coach Jeff Fisher with the Tennessee Titans in 2007 as their wide receivers coach, a position he held for four years. In 2011, Graves became the wide receivers coach for the Carolina Panthers under new coach Ron Rivera. In 2013, Graves became the wide receivers coach for the San Diego Chargers under new head coach Mike McCoy.

Graves has been known to employ some unorthodox tactics as a coach; his receivers routinely catch bricks in order to improve their hands.

== Personal life ==
Fred and his wife Michele have two children: a daughter Amber, and a son Marcus.
