= Stanley Wilson Jr. =

American football player (1982–2023)

Stanley Wilson

No. 33, 31
- Position: Cornerback

Personal information
- Born: November 5, 1982; Oklahoma City, Oklahoma, U.S.
- Died: February 1, 2023 (aged 40); Norwalk, California, U.S.
- Listed height: 6 ft 0 in (1.83 m)
- Listed weight: 189 lb (86 kg)

Career information
- High school: Bishop Montgomery (Torrance, California)
- College: Stanford
- NFL draft: 2005: 3rd round, 72nd overall pick

Career history
- Detroit Lions (2005–2008)

Career NFL statistics
- Total tackles: 89
- Forced fumbles: 1
- Pass deflections: 8
- Stats at Pro Football Reference

Stanley Tobias Wilson Jr. (November 5, 1982 – February 1, 2023) was an American professional football player who was a cornerback for the Detroit Lions of the National Football League (NFL). He played college football for the Stanford Cardinal and was selected by the Lions in the third round of the 2005 NFL draft.

== Early life ==
The son of former Cincinnati Bengals running back Stanley Wilson Sr., Stanley Jr. grew up in Carson, California, with his grandparents and attended Bishop Montgomery High School in Torrance.

== College career ==
Recruited by Tyrone Willingham, Wilson enrolled at Stanford University in 2000. After redshirting his true freshman season, Wilson played four seasons on the Stanford Cardinal football team from 2001 to 2004, the last three under coach Walt Harris. Wilson became a regular starter as a sophomore in 2002, with 32 tackles (27 solo) and two interceptions. In 2003, Wilson had 27 tackles, six passes defended, and one interception. As a senior in 2004, Wilson recorded career highs with 54 tackles (41 solo and 2.5 for loss) and five passes defended, in addition to one interception returned for 51 yards, and earned honorable mention All-Pac-10 honors.

== Professional career ==
Pre-draft measurables
Height	Weight	Arm length	Hand span	40-yard dash	10-yard split	20-yard split	Vertical jump	Broad jump	Bench press
5 ft 11 3/4 in (1.82 m)	185 lb (84 kg)	30 1/4 in (0.77 m)	9 in (0.23 m)	4.39 s	1.55 s	2.58 s	39.5 in (1.00 m)	10 ft 3 in (3.12 m)	14 reps
All values from NFL Combine

In the 2005 NFL draft, the Detroit Lions picked Wilson in the third round (72nd overall). Wilson's NFL career lasted from 2005 to 2007, all with the Lions. In 32 games (nine starts) in the NFL, Wilson had 86 tackles (63 solo), eight passes deflected, and one forced fumble. On November 28, 2007, Wilson was placed on injured reserve due to a knee injury.

The Lions re-signed Wilson to a one-year deal on April 11, 2008. However, Wilson tore his Achilles tendon during an exhibition game against the New York Giants on August 7, an injury later revealed to be career-ending.

== Personal life ==
=== Legal issues ===
After his playing career concluded, Wilson started to show signs of Bipolar disorder, which manifested in manic episodes such as stripping naked in public; Wilson later told his mother about being molested as a child by a babysitter. Wilson had an episode in 2014 that saw a couple help him into a New York City hotel room and call his mother. On June 22, 2016, Wilson was shot by an elderly homeowner in Portland, Oregon, after Wilson attempted to break into the man's home while naked. He was hospitalized but recovered from his injuries and was charged with attempted burglary. In November 2016, Wilson tested positive for methamphetamines. He was arrested again in Portland on January 10, 2017, while again nude; the arresting officer noted he appeared to be on drugs when he was caught roaming naked around another neighborhood.

On February 13, 2017, Wilson was sentenced to 10 days in jail with three years of probation for the June incident where he was shot; the judge also ordered him to undergo drug treatment, pay restitution for damages caused to homes, and write apology letters. On February 18, 2017, Wilson was arrested naked a third time allegedly attempting to burglarize a home.

=== Death ===
In the last five months of his life, Wilson had been in the Twin Towers Correctional Facility in downtown Los Angeles after he had broken in a home in Hollywood Hills during a psychotic break. On February 1, 2023, he was transported by sheriff's deputies to Metropolitan State Hospital in Norwalk for psychiatric treatment. He died at the hospital that day. He was 40. Two separate autopsies stated that he died of a pulmonary thromboembolism, but accounts of whether he died at the facility or the hospital differed. These inconsistencies led the Wilson family to file a wrongful death lawsuit against the Sheriff's Department, the Department of State Hospitals and L.A. County in September 2023.

He is one of at least 345 NFL players to be diagnosed after death with chronic traumatic encephalopathy (CTE), which is caused by repeated hits to the head.
