= R. W. McQuarters =

American football player (born 1976)

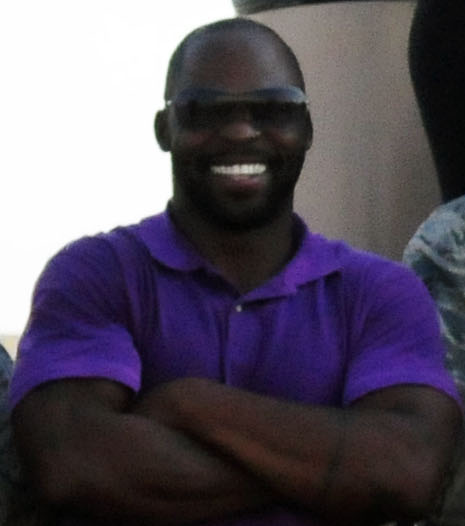
- McQuarters at the 380th Air Expeditionary Wing in 2011

No. 21, 25, 31
- Position: Cornerback

Personal information
- Born: December 21, 1976 (age 49); Tulsa, Oklahoma, U.S.
- Listed height: 5 ft 10 in (1.78 m)
- Listed weight: 194 lb (88 kg)

Career information
- High school: Booker T. Washington (Tulsa)
- College: Oklahoma State
- NFL draft: 1998: 1st round, 28th overall pick

Career history
- San Francisco 49ers (1998–1999); Chicago Bears (2000–2004); Detroit Lions (2005); New York Giants (2006–2008)

Awards and highlights
- Super Bowl champion (XLII); First-team All-Big 12 (1997); First-team All-Big Eight (1995)

Career NFL statistics
- Tackles: 483
- Sacks: 3
- Forced fumbles: 2
- Interceptions: 14
- Return yards: 3,389
- Total touchdowns: 7
- Stats at Pro Football Reference

Robert William McQuarters, II (born December 21, 1976) is an American former professional football player who was a cornerback in the National Football League (NFL). He was selected by the San Francisco 49ers in the first round of the 1998 NFL draft. He played college football for the Oklahoma State Cowboys.

== College career ==
McQuarters was known as one of the most versatile players in college football during his time at Oklahoma State, playing defensive back, wide receiver, and kick returner. He started nine games at wide receiver as a junior and finished his college career with eight receptions for 245 yards (30.6 avg.) and two touchdowns. He rushed for 69 yards on two carries and one touchdown. He ranked second in the nation and set a school record with 521 punt return yards for a 16.3-yard average and one touchdown and added 195 yards on eight kickoff returns for an average of 24.4 yards per attempt.

McQuarters played Oklahoma State Cowboys basketball for three years. Prior to attending OSU, McQuarters played basketball at Booker T. Washington High School in Tulsa. McQuarters played for coach Nate Harris who, in 1996, coached the West Team in the McDonald's High School All-American Game.

== Professional career ==
He is a favorite of former Detroit Lions coach Steve Mariucci, who drafted him with the 28th overall pick in the first round when Mariucci was head coach of the 49ers, then signed him as a free agent with the Lions.

Prior to the 2006 season, McQuarters signed with the New York Giants. As a member of the Giants, McQuarters had a key interception in a 2007 NFC divisional playoff game against the Dallas Cowboys that sealed New York's victory. McQuarters earned a Super Bowl ring with the Giants in Super Bowl XLII beating the New England Patriots.

== NFL career statistics ==
Legend
| | Won the Super Bowl |
| | Led the league |
| **Bold** | Career high |

=== Regular season ===
| Year | Team | Games | | Tackles | | | | Interceptions | | | | Fumbles | | | |
| Year | Team | GP | GS | Comb | Solo | Ast | Sck | Int | Yds | TD | Lng | FF | FR | Yds | TD |
|---|---|---|---|---|---|---|---|---|---|---|---|---|---|---|---|
| 1998 | SFO | 16 | 7 | 49 | 45 | 4 | 0.0 | 0 | 0 | 0 | 0 | 0 | **2** | 0 | 0 |
| 1999 | SFO | 11 | 4 | 29 | 26 | 3 | 0.0 | 1 | 25 | 0 | 25 | 0 | 0 | 0 | 0 |
| 2000 | CHI | 15 | 2 | 33 | 24 | 9 | **1.0** | 1 | 61 | **1** | **61** | 0 | 0 | 0 | 0 |
| 2001 | CHI | 16 | 16 | **79** | **65** | **14** | **1.0** | **3** | 47 | 0 | 43 | **1** | 1 | **69** | **1** |
| 2002 | CHI | 9 | 9 | 43 | 35 | 8 | 0.0 | 1 | 33 | 0 | 33 | 0 | 1 | 0 | 0 |
| 2003 | CHI | 16 | 6 | 46 | 38 | 8 | 0.0 | 2 | 72 | 0 | 43 | 0 | 0 | 0 | 0 |
| 2004 | CHI | 16 | 14 | 67 | 55 | 12 | 0.0 | 2 | **85** | **1** | 45 | 0 | **2** | 3 | 0 |
| 2005 | DET | 16 | 11 | 60 | 49 | 11 | 0.0 | 2 | 25 | 0 | 19 | 0 | 1 | 0 | 0 |
| 2006 | NYG | 16 | 10 | 56 | 51 | 5 | **1.0** | 2 | 67 | **1** | 27 | **1** | 0 | 0 | 0 |
| 2007 | NYG | 16 | 2 | 15 | 14 | 1 | 0.0 | 0 | 0 | 0 | 0 | 0 | 1 | 0 | 0 |
| 2008 | NYG | 9 | 0 | 6 | 4 | 2 | 0.0 | 0 | 0 | 0 | 0 | 0 | 1 | 0 | 0 |
| Career | | 156 | 81 | 483 | 406 | 77 | 3.0 | 14 | 415 | 3 | 61 | 2 | 9 | 72 | 1 |

=== Playoffs ===
| Year | Team | Games | | Tackles | | | | Interceptions | | | | Fumbles | | | |
| Year | Team | GP | GS | Comb | Solo | Ast | Sck | Int | Yds | TD | Lng | FF | FR | Yds | TD |
|---|---|---|---|---|---|---|---|---|---|---|---|---|---|---|---|
| 2001 | CHI | 1 | 1 | **10** | **10** | 0 | 0.0 | 0 | 0 | 0 | 0 | 0 | 0 | 0 | 0 |
| 2006 | NYG | 1 | 1 | 3 | 3 | 0 | 0.0 | 0 | 0 | 0 | 0 | 0 | **1** | 0 | 0 |
| 2007 | NYG | 4 | 1 | 5 | 4 | **1** | 0.0 | **3** | **11** | 0 | **11** | 0 | 0 | 0 | 0 |
| 2008 | NYG | 1 | 0 | 1 | 1 | 0 | 0.0 | 0 | 0 | 0 | 0 | 0 | 0 | 0 | 0 |
| Career | | 9 | 3 | 19 | 18 | 1 | 0.0 | 3 | 11 | 0 | 11 | 0 | 1 | 0 | 0 |

== Legal history ==
In October 2006, a Chicago judge dismissed McQuarters's claims that a bank wrongfully declared him in default on $1.3 million in loans. McQuarters claimed in a countersuit that the bank's representatives had violated consumer fraud acts and its employees had forged his signature on bank documents. The judge ordered him to pay the bank's legal fees of about $20,000.

== Personal life ==
McQuarters was known for his long dreadlocks which he cut in 2007 after growing them out starting in 1998. McQuarters donated the hair to Locks of Love. McQuarters is known for wearing a variety of band-aids under one or both eyes, including those depicting the Nickelodeon character SpongeBob SquarePants.

On April 29, 2011, McQuarters was shot once in the back as he departed a friend's house in Tulsa. McQuarters was not seriously hurt, and was able to drive himself to the hospital. He described the gunman as a man wearing a ski mask.
