= Kenoy Kennedy =

American football player (born 1977)

No. 28, 26
- Position: Safety

Personal information
- Born: November 15, 1977 (age 48); Dallas, Texas, U.S.
- Listed height: 6 ft 1 in (1.85 m)
- Listed weight: 215 lb (98 kg)

Career information
- High school: Terrell (TX)
- College: Arkansas
- NFL draft: 2000: 2nd round, 45th overall pick

Career history
- Denver Broncos (2000–2004); Detroit Lions (2005–2007)

Awards and highlights
- Third-team All-American (1999); First-team All-SEC (1999); Second-team All-SEC (1998)

Career NFL statistics
- Total tackles: 550
- Sacks: 6
- Forced fumbles: 7
- Fumble recoveries: 4
- Interceptions: 10
- Defensive touchdowns: 1
- Stats at Pro Football Reference

Kenoy Wayne Kennedy (born November 15, 1977) is an American former professional football player who was a safety in the National Football League (NFL). He played college football for the Arkansas Razorbacks and was selected by the Denver Broncos in the second round of the 2000 NFL draft. He also played for the Detroit Lions.

== College career ==
Kennedy signed with Arkansas in the 1996 recruiting class out of Terrell High School in Terrell, TX as a defensive back. He was recruited by then-head coach Danny Ford. Kennedy was a back-up at free safety his freshman year in 1996, then earned the starting job in 1997. Ford was fired after the "97 season and Houston Nutt was hired as the new head coach.

Kennedy was a mainstay in the Razorback secondary by 1998, helping Arkansas win a share of the SEC West Division championship. Kennedy earned 2nd Team All-SEC honors for a 9-3 Arkansas squad in "98. In 1999, Kennedy was named to the Coaches Poll 1st Team All-SEC squad, and was again SEC 2nd Team AP. His big-time hits and solid tackling helped the Razorbacks beat the Texas Longhorns in the 2000 Cotton Bowl Classic on an 8-4 team. It was Arkansas' first bowl victory since 1985 and their first Cotton Bowl win since 1976.

== Professional career ==
=== Denver Broncos ===
Kennedy was drafted in the second round by the Denver Broncos with the 45th overall pick in the 2000 NFL draft. He played five seasons with the team before becoming a free agent in 2005.

=== Detroit Lions ===
Kennedy signed with the Detroit Lions in the 2005 offseason. He played three seasons with the team before being released on March 14, 2008.

=== NFL statistics ===
Year	Team	Games	Combined tackles	Tackles	Assisted tackles	Sacks	Forced fumbles	Fumble recoveries	Fumble return yards	Interceptions	Interception return yards	Yards per interception return	Longest interception return	Interceptions returned for touchdown	Passes defended
2000	DEN	13	7	5	2	0.0	0	0	0	1	0	0	0	0	1
2001	DEN	16	73	54	19	2.0	0	0	0	1	6	6	6	0	6
2002	DEN	15	68	54	14	0.0	0	0	0	0	0	0	0	0	5
2003	DEN	13	56	41	15	1.0	1	1	0	1	0	0	0	0	6
2004	DEN	16	87	69	18	2.0	2	1	0	1	21	21	21	0	9
2005	DET	16	98	74	24	0.0	1	0	0	2	64	32	64	1	7
2006	DET	10	66	46	20	1.0	1	1	0	2	17	9	17	0	2
2007	DET	16	88	59	29	0.0	2	1	0	2	45	23	38	0	5
Career		115	544	402	142	6.0	7	4	0	10	153	15	64	1	41
