= Fernando Bryant =

American football player (born 1977)

No. 25
- Position: Cornerback

Personal information
- Born: March 26, 1977 (age 49); Albany, Georgia, U.S.
- Listed height: 5 ft 11 in (1.80 m)
- Listed weight: 184 lb (83 kg)

Career information
- High school: Riverdale (Murfreesboro, Tennessee)
- College: Alabama
- NFL draft: 1999: 1st round, 26th overall pick

Career history
- Jacksonville Jaguars (1999–2003); Detroit Lions (2004–2007); New England Patriots (2008)*; Pittsburgh Steelers (2008)
- * Offseason or practice squad member only

Awards and highlights
- Super Bowl champion (XLIII); PFWA All-Rookie Team (1999); First-team All-SEC (1998); 2× Second-team All-SEC (1996, 1997)

Career NFL statistics
- Total tackles: 472
- Forced fumbles: 2
- Fumble recoveries: 7
- Pass deflections: 79
- Interceptions: 7
- Stats at Pro Football Reference

Fernando Antoneyo Bryant (born March 26, 1977) is an American former professional football player who was a cornerback of the National Football League (NFL). He was selected by the Jacksonville Jaguars 26th overall in the 1999 NFL draft. He played college football for the Alabama Crimson Tide.

Bryant was also a member of the Detroit Lions, New England Patriots, and Pittsburgh Steelers. He won Super Bowl XLIII as a member of the Steelers.

== Early life ==
Bryant attended Riverdale High School in Murfreesboro, Tennessee, and starred in football as a wide receiver/defensive back and in track as a sprinter. In football, as a senior, he garnered All-American honors, and finished the year with six interceptions and 82 tackles on defense, and 48 receptions on offense.

== College career ==
At the University of Alabama, Bryant was an All-SEC second-team selection in 1996 and 1997, as well as an All-SEC first-team selection in 1998 and nicknamed TWO-FIVE.

== Professional career ==
=== Jacksonville Jaguars ===
Bryant was selected in the first round (26th overall) in the 1999 NFL draft by the Jacksonville Jaguars. He spent five years with the Jaguars.

=== Detroit Lions ===
On March 5, 2004, the Detroit Lions signed Bryant to a six–year, $24 million contract that included a signing bonus of $7.25 million.

On February 25, 2008, the Lions released Bryant.

=== New England Patriots ===
On March 20, 2008, he signed a one-year deal with the New England Patriots, he was cut by the team on August 30, 2008.

=== Pittsburgh Steelers ===
On November 11, 2008, Bryant was signed by the Pittsburgh Steelers where he was reunited with college teammate Deshea Townsend.

In June 2009, Bryant retired.

=== NFL statistics ===
Year	Team	GP	Tackles				Fumbles		Interceptions					
Year	Team	GP	Comb	Solo	Ast	Sack	FF	FR	Int	Yds	Avg	Lng	TD	PD
1999	JAX	16	69	60	9	0.0	0	3	2	0	0.0	0	0	16
2000	JAX	14	43	37	6	0.0	0	1	1	0	0.0	0	0	7
2001	JAX	10	54	49	5	0.0	0	0	0	0	0.0	0	0	6
2002	JAX	16	59	57	2	0.0	0	2	1	26	26.0	26	0	12
2003	JAX	16	70	61	9	0.0	0	0	1	0	0.0	0	0	9
2004	DET	10	51	42	9	0.0	0	0	0	0	0.0	0	0	9
2005	DET	2	8	7	1	0.0	1	0	0	0	0.0	0	0	1
2006	DET	10	46	36	10	0.0	0	1	0	0	0.0	0	0	6
2007	DET	16	69	59	10	0.0	1	0	2	0	0.0	0	0	13
2008	PIT	2	3	3	0	0.0	0	0	0	0	0.0	0	0	0
Career		112	472	411	61	0.0	2	7	7	26	3.7	26	0	79
