= 2002 Detroit Lions season =

NFL team season

- Owner: William Clay Ford Sr.
- General manager: Matt Millen
- Head coach: Marty Mornhinweg
- Home stadium: Ford Field

Results
- Record: 3–13
- Division place: 4th NFC North
- Playoffs: Did not qualify
- Pro Bowlers: None

Uniform

The 2002 season was the Detroit Lions' 73rd in the National Football League (NFL). It was the Lions’ inaugural season at the new Ford Field in Downtown Detroit and their first in the city since the team left Tiger Stadium after the 1974 season. Following the season, Marty Mornhinweg was fired and Steve Mariucci was hired as the Lions' head coach. The Lions entered the 2002 season looking to improve on their 2–14 record from 2001 and make the playoffs for the first time since 1999.

They improved on their record, winning 3 games. However, the new stadium didn't help the team overall, and they continued to disappoint, beginning the season with three consecutive losses. By week 9, the Lions had a 3–5 record after a win over the Dallas Cowboys. However, after that win, the Lions lost their remaining 8 games to finish the season 3–13 and failed to reach the playoffs. The Lions also went 0–8 on the road for the second straight season. As a result, Marty Mornhinweg was fired after the season. In his 2 seasons as head coach, the Lions went 5–27 for a winning percentage of .156.

== Offseason ==
Additions	Subtractions
G Ray Brown (49ers)	QB Charlie Batch (Steelers)
FS Corey Harris (Ravens)	LB Scott Kowalkowski (retirement)
WR Bill Schroeder (Packers)	WR Johnnie Morton (Chiefs)
TE Mikhael Ricks (Chiefs)	DE Tracy Scroggins (retirement)
LB Jeff Gooch (Buccaneers)	TE David Sloan (Saints)
WR Az-Zahir Hakim (Rams)	CB Terry Fair (Panthers)

=== NFL draft ===
2002 Detroit Lions draft
Round	Pick	Player	Position	College	Notes
1	3	Joey Harrington	Quarterback	Oregon	
2	35	Kalimba Edwards	Defensive end	South Carolina	
3	68	André Goodman	Cornerback	South Carolina	
4	134	Johnathan Taylor	Defensive end	Montana State	
5	138	John Owens	Tight end	Notre Dame	
6	175	Chris Cash	Cornerback	USC	
7	214	Luke Staley	Running back	BYU	
7	252	Matt Murphy	Tight end	Maryland	
7	259	Victor Rogers	Tackle	Colorado	
Made roster

=== Undrafted free agents ===
2002 undrafted free agents of note
Player	Position	College
Pierre Brown	Wide receiver	Wayne State
Robert Chapman	Linebacker	Southern
Crance Clemons	Cornerback	UTEP
Mike Collins	Defensive tackle	Ohio State
Eddie Drummond	Wide receiver	Penn State
Aaron Edmonds	Punter	BYU
Chris Glantzis	Defensive end	Bowling Green
Abdual Howard	Safety	Florida State
Marcel Howard	Tackle	Iowa State
Kenny Jackson	Defensive tackle	Ole Miss
Antwan Lake	Defensive tackle	West Virginia
James McCall	Tackle	West Virginia
Labrone Mitchell	Wide receiver	Georgia
James Mungro	Running back	Syracuse
Dave Pavich	Kicker	Kent State
Ken Philpot	Linebacker	Eastern Michigan
Kris Ryan	Fullback	Penn
Josh Thornhill	Linebacker	Michigan State

== Personnel ==
=== Staff ===
2002 Detroit Lions staff
Front office: Owner and chairman – William Clay Ford Sr.; Vice chairman – William Clay Ford Jr.; President and chief executive officer – Matt Millen; Executive vice president and chief operating officer – Tom Lewand; Senior director of football administration/staff counsel – Martin Mayhew; Executive director of player personnel – Bill Tobin; Director of pro personnel – Sheldon White; Director of college scouting – Russ Bolinger; Assistant director of pro personnel – Charlie Sanders; Head coaches: Head coach – Marty Mornhinweg; Offensive coaches: Offensive coordinator/running backs – Maurice Carthon; Quarterbacks – Kevin Higgins; Wide receivers – Larry Kirksey; Tight ends – Sean Kugler; Offensive line – Carl Mauck; Special assistant/offense – Sherman Lewis; Offensive assistant/quality control – Mike McHugh	Defensive coaches: Defensive coordinator – Kurt Schottenheimer; Defensive line – Charles Haley; Assistant defensive line – John Marshall; Linebackers – Glenn Pires; Secondary – Ray Horton; Defensive nickel package – Richard Selcer; Defensive assistant/quality control – Don Clemons; Special teams coaches: Special teams – Chuck Priefer; Assistant special teams – Kevin O'Dea; Strength and conditioning: Strength and conditioning – Jason Arapoff; Assistant strength and conditioning – Malcolm Blacken; Assistant strength and conditioning – Mondray Gee

== Roster ==
2002 Detroit Lions roster
Quarterbacks (QB): 14 Ty Detmer; 15 Dave Dickenson; 3 Joey Harrington; 8 Mike McMahon; Running backs (RB): 31 Aveion Cason; 23 Rafael Cooper; 40 Autry Denson; 30 Cory Schlesinger FB; 34 James Stewart; 36 Stephen Trejo FB; Wide receivers (WR): 88 Scotty Anderson; 82 Germane Crowell; 18 Eddie Drummond KR/PR; 87 Larry Foster KR; 12 Jacquez Green; 84 Bill Schroeder; Tight ends (TE): 49 Matt Murphy; 83 John Owens; 86 Mikhael Ricks	Offensive linemen (OL): 76 Jeff Backus T; 79 Eric Beverly C/G; 61 Ray Brown G; 64 Tyrone Hopson C/G; 75 Matt Joyce G/T; 70 Josh Lovelady G; 73 Stockar McDougle T; 51 Dominic Raiola C; 63 Frank Romero G; Defensive linemen (DL): 98 Kalimba Edwards DE; 96 James Hall DE; 67 Travis Kirschke DT; 68 Antwan Lake DE/DT; 91 Robert Porcher DE; 93 Kelvin Pritchett DT; 92 Shaun Rogers DT	Linebackers (LB): 50 Chris Claiborne MLB; 55 Donté Curry OLB; 59 Jeff Gooch OLB; 54 Barrett Green OLB; 58 Clint Kriewaldt OLB; 57 Josh Thornhill MLB; Defensive backs (DB): 39 Lamar Campbell FS; 29 Chris Cash CB; 26 Eric Davis CB/FS; 35 André Goodman CB; 41 Donovan Greer CB; 25 Corey Harris SS; 24 Todd Lyght CB; 45 Brian Walker FS; 27 Jimmy Wyrick CB; Special teams (ST): 89 Bradford Banta LS; 4 Jason Hanson K; 19 John Jett P	Practice squad: 11 Pierre Brown WR; 17 Kahlil Hill WR; 43 James Lewis S; 46 Jody Littleton LS; 53 Kenny Philpot LB; Reserve: 65 Kerlin Blaise T (IR); 95 Jared DeVries DE (IR); 94 Luther Elliss DT (IR); 81 Az-Zahir Hakim WR/PR (IR); 77 Anthony Herron DE (PUP); 80 Desmond Howard WR/KR/PR (IR); 52 Richard Jordan LB (IR); 72 Victor Rogers T (IR); 62 Tony Semple G (IR); 33 Luke Staley RB (IR); 90 Johnathan Taylor DE (IR); 28 Bracy Walker S (IR); 21 Lamont Warren RB (IR); 99 Brian Williams LB (IR); Rookies in italics 53 active, 14 reserve, 5 practice squad

== Regular season ==
In addition to their regular games against NFC North rivals, the Lions under the NFL's new scheduling formula played games against teams from the NFC South and from the AFC East. They also played the Dallas Cowboys and Arizona Cardinals, who had the fourth best records from 2001 of the teams placed in their respective divisions.

=== Schedule ===
Week	Date	Opponent	Result	Record	Venue	Recap
1	September 8	at Miami Dolphins	L 21–49	0–1	Pro Player Stadium	72,216
2	September 15	at Carolina Panthers	L 7–31	0–2	Ericsson Stadium	71,951
3	September 22	Green Bay Packers	L 31–37	0–3	Ford Field	61,505
4	September 29	New Orleans Saints	W 26–21	1–3	Ford Field	60,023
5	Bye					
6	October 13	at Minnesota Vikings	L 24–31	1–4	Hubert H. Humphrey Metrodome	64,013
7	October 20	Chicago Bears	W 23–20 (OT)	2–4	Ford Field	60,421
8	October 27	at Buffalo Bills	L 17–24	2–5	Ralph Wilson Stadium	72,710
9	November 3	Dallas Cowboys	W 9–7	3–5	Ford Field	61,789
10	November 10	at Green Bay Packers	L 14–40	3–6	Lambeau Field	63,313
11	November 17	New York Jets	L 14–31	3–7	Ford Field	61,720
12	November 24	at Chicago Bears	L 17–20 (OT)	3–8	Memorial Stadium	62,375
13	November 28	New England Patriots	L 12–20	3–9	Ford Field	62,109
14	December 8	at Arizona Cardinals	L 20–23 (OT)	3–10	Sun Devil Stadium	28,640
15	December 15	Tampa Bay Buccaneers	L 20–23	3–11	Ford Field	61,942
16	December 22	at Atlanta Falcons	L 15–36	3–12	Georgia Dome	69,307
17	December 29	Minnesota Vikings	L 36–38	3–13	Ford Field	60,233

=== Game summaries ===
==== Week 1: at Miami Dolphins ====
Week 1: Detroit Lions (0–0) at Miami Dolphins (0–0) – Game summary

Quarter	1	2	3	4	Total
Lions	0	7	7	7	21
Dolphins	7	21	14	7	49

at Pro Player Stadium, Miami Gardens, Florida

- Date: September 8, 2002
- Game time: 1:00 p.m.
- Game weather: Sunny, 87 °F (31 °C)
- Game attendance: 72,216
- Referee: Jeff Triplette (42)
- TV announcers (FOX): Dan Miller, Mark Carrier, Mike Di Pasquale
- Recap, Game Book

Game information

First quarter

- MIA – Ricky Williams 1-yard run (Olindo Mare kick), 3:07. Dolphins 7–0. Drive: 9 plays, 90 yards, 5:21.

Second quarter

- MIA – Trent Gamble fumble recovery in the end zone (Olindo Mare kick), 14:46. Dolphins 14–0.
- MIA – Randy McMichael 16-yard pass from Jay Fiedler (Olindo Mare kick), 10:11. Dolphins 21–0. Drive: 7 plays, 64 yards, 3:31.
- DET – Mike McMahon 2-yard run (Jason Hanson kick), 4:20. Dolphins 21–7. Drive: 14 plays, 80 yards, 5:51.
- MIA – Chris Chambers 9-yard pass from Jay Fiedler (Olindo Mare kick), 0:08. Dolphins 28–7. Drive: 8 plays, 66 yards, 1:28.

Third quarter

- MIA – Ricky Williams 2-yard run (Olindo Mare kick), 14:41. Dolphins 35–7. Drive: 1 play, 2 yards, 0:06.
- DET – Lamont Warren 13-yard pass from Mike McMahon (Jason Hanson kick), 6:19. Dolphins 35–14. Drive: 7 plays, 45 yards, 4:11.
- MIA – Robert Edwards 4-yard pass from Jay Fiedler (Olindo Mare kick), 3:59. Dolphins 42–14. Drive: 5 plays, 43 yards, 2:20.

Fourth quarter

- MIA – Robert Edwards 1-yard run (Olindo Mare kick), 10:39. Dolphins 49–14. Drive: 11 plays, 77 yards, 6:39.
- DET – Cory Schlesinger 2-yard run (Jason Hanson kick), 5:48. Dolphins 49–21. Drive: 11 plays, 77 yards, 4:51.

Top passers

- DET – Mike McMahon – 13/25, 179 yards, TD, INT
- MIA – Jay Fiedler – 18/27, 207 yards, 3 TD

Top rushers

- DET – Cory Schlesinger – 8 rushes, 28 yards, TD
- MIA – Ricky Williams – 20 rushes, 111 yards, 2 TD

Top receivers

- DET – Az-Zahir Hakim – 9 receptions, 97 yards
- MIA – Randy McMichael – 4 receptions, 73 yards, TD

==== Week 2: at Carolina Panthers ====
Week 2: Detroit Lions at Carolina Panthers

Quarter	1	2	3	4	Total
Lions	0	0	7	0	7
Panthers	0	10	14	7	31

at Ericsson Stadium, Charlotte, North Carolina

- Date: September 15, 2002
- Game time: 1:00 p.m.
- Game weather: Cloudy, 72 °F (22 °C)
- Game attendance: 71,951
- Referee: Gerald Austin (34)
- TV announcers (FOX): Kenny Albert and Tim Green
- Recap, Game Book

Game information

First quarter

- No scoring plays.

Second quarter

- CAR – John Kasay 23-yard field goal, 3:27. Panthers 3–0. Drive: 5 plays, 19 yards, 2:09.
- CAR – Muhsin Muhammad 22-yard pass from Rodney Peete (John Kasay kick), 0:16. Panthers 10–0. Drive: 5 plays, 69 yards, 0:46.

Third quarter

- DET – Mike McMahon 11-yard run (Jason Hanson kick), 8:21. Panthers 10–7. Drive: 5 plays, 76 yards, 3:10.
- CAR – Lamar Smith 3-yard run (John Kasay kick), 6:44. Panthers 17–7. Drive: 4 plays, 77 yards, 1:37.
- CAR – Mike Minter 40-yard interception return (John Kasay kick), 5:49. Panthers 24–7.

Fourth quarter

- CAR – Lamar Smith 1-yard run (John Kasay kick), 9:43. Panthers 31–7. Drive: 10 plays, 71 yards, 5:44.

Top passers

- DET – Mike McMahon – 9/23, 95 yards, INT
- CAR – Rodney Peete – 21/32, 310 yards, TD

Top rushers

- DET – James Stewart – 12 rushes, 53 yards
- CAR – Lamar Smith – 20 rushes, 60 yards, 2 TD

Top receivers

- DET – Scotty Anderson – 2 receptions, 31 yards
- CAR – Muhsin Muhammad – 8 receptions, 107 yards, TD

==== Week 3: vs. Green Bay Packers ====
Week 3: Green Bay Packers at Detroit Lions

Quarter	1	2	3	4	Total
Packers	7	10	14	6	37
Lions	7	10	0	14	31

at Ford Field, Detroit, Michigan

- Date: September 22, 2002
- Game time: 4:15 pm
- Game weather: None (indoor stadium)
- Game attendance: 61,505
- Referee: Bill Leavy (127)
- TV announcers (Fox): Joe Buck, Cris Collinsworth, and Troy Aikman
- Recap, Game Book

Game information

First quarter

- DET – Az-Zahir Hakim 72-yard punt return (Jason Hanson kick), 12:27. Lions 7–0.
- GB – Marques Anderson 78-yard interception return (Ryan Longwell kick), 7:17. Tied 7–7.

Second quarter

- GB – Donald Driver 21-yard pass from Brett Favre (Ryan Longwell kick), 14:56. Packers 14–7. Drive: 10 plays, 82 yards, 6:14.
- DET – Jason Hanson 33-yard field goal, 10:00. Packers 14–10. Drive: 4 plays, −5 yards, 0:56.
- GB – Ryan Longwell 46-yard field goal, 5:15. Packers 17–10. Drive: 12 plays, 53 yards, 4:45.
- DET – Lamont Warren 39-yard pass from Joey Harrington (Jason Hanson kick), 3:13. Tied 17–17. Drive: 4 plays, 64 yards, 2:02.

Third quarter

- GB – Robert Ferguson 8-yard pass from Brett Favre (Ryan Longwell kick), 7:56. Packers 24–17. Drive: 12 plays, 72 yards, 7:04.
- GB – Bubba Franks 3-yard pass from Brett Favre (Ryan Longwell kick), 1:30. Packers 31–17. Drive: 4 plays, 41 yards, 1:29.

Fourth quarter

- GB – Ryan Longwell 34-yard field goal, 10:27. Packers 34–17. Drive: 11 plays, 44 yards, 4:44.
- DET – Cory Schlesinger 1-yard run (Jason Hanson kick), 8:23. Packers 34–24. Drive: 4 plays, 45 yards, 2:04.
- DET – James Stewart 52-yard pass from Joey Harrington (Jason Hanson kick), 1:37. Packers 34–31. Drive: 8 plays, 95 yards, 2:02.
- GB – Ryan Longwell 47-yard field goal, 1:15. Packers 37–31. Drive: 4 plays, 6 yards, 0:22.

Top passers

- GB – Brett Favre – 31/47, 357 yards, 3 TD, INT
- DET – Joey Harrington – 15/35, 182 yards, 2 TD, 4 INT

Top rushers

- GB – Najeh Davenport – 22 rushes, 84 yards
- DET – James Stewart – 14 rushes, 88 yards

Top receivers

- GB – Donald Driver – 5 receptions, 94 yards, TD
- DET – James Stewart – 2 receptions, 56 yards, TD

==== Week 4: vs. New Orleans Saints ====
Week 4: New Orleans Saints at Detroit Lions

Quarter	1	2	3	4	Total
Saints	0	7	8	6	21
Lions	13	7	3	3	26

at Ford Field, Detroit, Michigan

- Date: September 29, 2002
- Game time: 1:03 pm
- Game weather: None (indoor stadium)
- Game attendance: 60,023
- Referee: Ron Winter (14)
- TV announcers (Fox): Curt Menefee, Tim Ryan, and Jennifer Hammond
- Recap, Game Book

Game information

First quarter

- DET – Jason Hanson 23-yard field goal, 12:03. Lions 3–0. Drive: 6 plays, 17 yards, 2:57.
- DET – James Hall 22-yard fumble return (Jason Hanson kick), 10:31. Lions 10–0.
- DET – Jason Hanson 34-yard field goal, 5:41. Lions 13–0. Drive: 7 plays, 36 yards, 3:42.

Second quarter

- DET – Bill Schroeder 38-yard pass from Joey Harrington (Jason Hanson kick), 4:53. Lions 20–0. Drive: 3 plays, 80 yards, 1:30.
- NO – Donte Stallworth 4-yard pass from Aaron Brooks (John Carney kick), 1:25. Lions 20–7. Drive: 12 plays, 91 yards, 3:28.

Third quarter

- DET – Jason Hanson 23-yard field goal, 7:24. Lions 23–7. Drive: 7 plays, 36 yards, 2:27.
- NO – Deuce McAllister 12-yard run (Aaron Brooks run), 3:41. Lions 23–15. Drive: 7 plays, 72 yards, 3:43.

Fourth quarter

- DET – Jason Hanson 38-yard field goal, 11:47. Lions 26–15. Drive: 7 plays, 17 yards, 2:58.
- NO – Jerome Pathon 6-yard pass from Aaron Brooks (Run Failed), 3:41. Lions 26–21. Drive: 9 plays, 82 yards, 2:22.

Top passers

- NO – Aaron Brooks – 27/48, 269 yards, 2 TD, 2 INT
- DET – Joey Harrington – 20/35, 267 yards, TD

Top rushers

- NO – Deuce McAllister – 12 rushes, 61 yards, TD
- DET – James Stewart – 18 rushes, 65 yards

Top receivers

- NO – Joe Horn – 6 receptions, 87 yards
- DET – Az-Zahir Hakim – 3 receptions, 98 yards

==== Week 6: at Minnesota Vikings ====
Week 6: Detroit Lions (1–3) at Minnesota Vikings (0–4) – Game summary

Quarter	1	2	3	4	Total
Lions	14	7	3	0	24
Vikings	3	7	7	14	31

at Hubert H. Humphrey Metrodome, Minneapolis, Minnesota

- Date: October 13, 2002
- Game time: 1:00 pm
- Game weather: None (indoor stadium)
- Game attendance: 64,013
- Referee: Larry Nemmers (20)
- TV announcers (Fox): Curt Menefee, Tim Green, and Mike Goldberg
- Recap, Game Book

Game information

First quarter

- DET – Mikhael Ricks 41-yard pass from Joey Harrington (Jason Hanson kick), 10:50. Lions 7–0. Drive: 4 plays, 80 yards, 2:04.
- DET – Chris Claiborne 20-yard interception return (Jason Hanson kick), 9:39. Lions 14–0.
- MIN – Gary Anderson 42-yard field goal, 5:54. Lions 14–3. Drive: 7 plays, 25 yards, 3:45.

Second quarter

- MIN – Jim Kleinsasser 1-yard pass from Daunte Culpepper (Gary Anderson kick), 12:34. Lions 14–10. Drive: 10 plays, 79 yards, 5:21.
- DET – Az-Zahir Hakim 20-yard pass from Joey Harrington (Jason Hanson kick), 1:11. Lions 21–10. Drive: 6 plays, 80 yards, 3:10.

Third quarter

- MIN – Daunte Culpepper 7-yard run (Gary Anderson kick), 9:51. Lions 21–17. Drive: 7 plays, 59 yards, 4:03.
- DET – Jason Hanson 49-yard field goal, 6:07. Lions 24–17. Drive: 8 plays, 28 yards, 3:44.

Fourth quarter

- MIN – Michael Bennett 45-yard pass from Daunte Culpepper (Gary Anderson kick), 5:25. Tied 24–24. Drive: 7 plays, 90 yards, 3:24.
- MIN – Moe Williams 2-yard run (Gary Anderson kick), 2:12. Vikings 31–24. Drive: 5 plays, 48 yards, 2:00.

Top passers

- DET – Joey Harrington – 25/41, 309 yards, 2 TD, INT
- MIN – Daunte Culpepper – 27/36, 295 yards, 2 TD, INT

Top rushers

- DET – James Stewart – 10 rushes, 42 yards
- MIN – Michael Bennett – 16 rushes, 68 yards

Top receivers

- DET – Mikhael Ricks – 3 receptions, 79 yards, TD
- MIN – Randy Moss – 9 receptions, 83 yards

==== Week 7: vs. Chicago Bears ====
Week 7: Chicago Bears (2–3) at Detroit Lions (1–4) – Game summary

Quarter	1	2	3	4	OT	Total
Bears	0	10	10	0	0	20
Lions	0	14	3	3	3	23

at Ford Field, Detroit, Michigan

- Date: October 20, 2002
- Game time: 1:00 p.m.
- Game weather: none (indoor stadium)
- Game attendance: 60,421
- Referee: Bernie Kukar (86)
- TV announcers (FOX): Dan Miller, Tim Green, and Jennifer Hammond
- Recap, Game Book

Game information

First quarter

- No scoring plays.

Second quarter

- CHI – Paul Edinger 53-yard field goal, 9:13. Bears 3–0. Drive: 10 plays, 36 yards, 4:58.
- DET – James Stewart 6-yard run (Jason Hanson kick), 4:59. Lions 7–3. Drive: 1 play, 6 yards, 0:03.
- DET – James Stewart 1-yard run (Jason Hanson kick), 1:11. Lions 14–3. Drive: 7 plays, 16 yards, 2:53.
- CHI – Marty Booker 14-yard pass from Chris Chandler (Paul Edinger kick), 0:05. Lions 14–10. Drive: 6 plays, 79 yards, 1:06.

Third quarter

- CHI – Anthony Thomas 1-yard run (Paul Edinger kick), 10:11. Bears 17–14. Drive: 8 plays, 75 yards, 4:49.
- CHI – Paul Edinger 42-yard field goal, 8:29. Bears 20–14. Drive: 4 plays, 1 yard, 0:13.
- DET – Jason Hanson 30-yard field goal, 0:34. Bears 20–17. Drive: 14 plays, 66 yards, 7:55.

Fourth quarter

- DET – Jason Hanson 24-yard field goal, 0:02. Tied 20–20. Drive: 11 plays, 72 yards, 2:19.

Overtime

- DET – Jason Hanson 48-yard field goal, 10:12. Lions 23–20. Drive: 8 plays, 30 yards, 4:48.

Top passers

- CHI – Chris Chandler – 16/25, 163 yards, TD, INT
- DET – Joey Harrington – 16/29, 199 yards

Top rushers

- CHI – Anthony Thomas – 26 rushes, 92 yards, TD
- DET – James Stewart – 32 rushes, 172 yards, 2 TD

Top receivers

- CHI – Dez White – 3 receptions, 70 yards
- DET – Aveion Cason – 3 receptions, 57 yards

==== Week 8: at Buffalo Bills ====
Week 8: Detroit Lions (2–4) at Buffalo Bills (4–3) – Game summary

Quarter	1	2	3	4	Total
Lions	0	14	0	3	17
Bills	7	7	10	0	24

at Ralph Wilson Stadium, Orchard Park, New York

- Date: October 27, 2002
- Game time: 1:00 p.m.
- Game weather: Cloudy, 47 °F (8 °C)
- Game attendance: 72,710
- Referee: Jeff Triplette (42)
- TV announcers (Fox): Ron Pitts, Tim Green and Bob Trimble
- Recap, Game Book

Game information

First quarter

- BUF – Travis Henry 5-yard run (Mike Hollis kick), 3:40. Bills 7–0. Drive: 2 plays, 47 yards, 0:45.

Second quarter

- DET – Az-Zahir Hakim 23-yard pass from Joey Harrington (Jason Hanson kick), 5:03. Tied 7–7. Drive: 8 plays, 80 yards, 4:02.
- DET – James Stewart 2-yard run (Jason Hanson kick), 3:00. Lions 14–7. Drive: 5 plays, 22 yards, 2:03.
- BUF – Peerless Price 59-yard pass from Drew Bledsoe (Mike Hollis kick), 1:04. Tied 14–14. Drive: 5 plays, 73 yards, 1:56.

Third quarter

- BUF – Mike Hollis 33-yard field goal, 11:09. Bills 17–14. Drive: 6 plays, 32 yards, 2:44.
- BUF – Travis Henry 5-yard run (Mike Hollis kick), 2:02. Bills 24–14. Drive: 11 plays, 60 yards, 4:38.

Fourth quarter

- DET – Jason Hanson 35-yard field goal, 3:07. Bills 24–17. Drive: 7 plays, 46 yards, 2:54.

Top passers

- DET – Joey Harrington – 20/42, 199 yards, TD, INT
- BUF – Drew Bledsoe – 21/36, 302 yards, TD

Top rushers

- DET – James Stewart – 24 rushes, 83 yards, TD
- BUF – Travis Henry – 19 rushes, 64 yards, 2 TD

Top receivers

- DET – James Stewart – 8 receptions, 53 yards
- BUF – Eric Moulds – 9 receptions, 123 yards

==== Week 9: vs. Dallas Cowboys ====
Week 9: Dallas Cowboys at Detroit Lions

Quarter	1	2	3	4	Total
Cowboys	0	0	0	7	7
Lions	0	0	6	3	9

at Ford Field, Detroit, Michigan

- Date: November 3, 2002
- Game time: 1:00 pm
- Game weather: None (indoor stadium)
- Game attendance: 64,013
- Referee: Walt Coleman (65)
- TV announcers (Fox): Pat Summerall, and Brian Baldinger
- Recap, Game Book

Game information

First quarter

- No scoring plays.

Second quarter

- No scoring plays.

Third quarter

- DET – Jason Hanson 42-yard field goal, 12:06. Lions 3–0. Drive: 4 plays, -7 yards, 2:08.
- DET – Jason Hanson 44-yard field goal, 6:09. Lions 6–0. Drive: 7 plays, 20 yards, 2:27.

Fourth quarter

- DAL – Troy Hambrick 3-yard run (Billy Cundiff kick), 7:42. Cowboys 7–6. Drive: 12 plays, 80 yards, 6:06.
- DET – Jason Hanson 43-yard field goal, 0:48. Lions 9–7. Drive: 9 plays, 38 yards, 2:59.

Top passers

- DAL – Chad Hutchinson – 22/39, 208 yards
- DET – Joey Harrington – 14/33, 104 yards, 2 INT

Top rushers

- DAL – Emmitt Smith – 16 rushes, 39 yards
- DET – James Stewart – 19 rushes, 50 yards

Top receivers

- DAL – Joey Galloway – 6 receptions, 56 yards
- DET – James Stewart – 4 receptions, 41 yards

==== Week 10: at Green Bay Packers ====
Week 10: Detroit Lions at Green Bay Packers

Quarter	1	2	3	4	Total
Lions	7	0	0	7	14
Packers	3	27	10	0	40

at Lambeau Field, Green Bay, Wisconsin

- Date: November 10, 2002
- Game time: 1:00 p.m.
- Game weather: Cloudy, 50 °F (10 °C)
- Game attendance: 63,329
- Referee: Dick Hantak (105)
- TV announcers (Fox): Joe Buck, Troy Aikman, Cris Collinsworth, and Pam Oliver
- Recap, Game Book

Game information

First quarter

- GB – Ryan Longwell 30-yard field goal, 7:47. Packers 3–0. Drive: 13 plays, 74 yards, 7:13.
- DET – Az-Zahir Hakim 64-yard pass from Joey Harrington (Jason Hanson kick), 7:32. Lions 7–3. Drive: 1 play, 64 yards, 0:15.

Second quarter

- GB – Bubba Franks 4-yard pass from Brett Favre (Ryan Longwell kick), 14:35. Packers 10–7. Drive: 9 plays, 64 yards, 4:52.
- GB – Ryan Longwell 40-yard field goal, 8:57. Packers 13–7. Drive: 9 plays, 65 yards, 4:03.
- GB – Ryan Longwell 36-yard field goal, 5:51. Packers 16–7. Drive: 7 plays, 17 yards, 1:47.
- GB - Marques Anderson 14-yard interception return (Ryan Longwell kick), 1:47. Packers 23–7.
- GB – Najeh Davenport 1-yard run (Ryan Longwell kick), 0:17. Packers 30–7. Drive: 6 plays, 68 yards, 1:03.

Third quarter

- GB – Ryan Longwell 33-yard field goal, 10:31. Packers 33–7. Drive: 6 plays, 51 yards, 2:35.
- GB – William Henderson 9-yard pass from Brett Favre (Ryan Longwell kick), 4:55. Packers 40–7. Drive: 9 plays, 69 yards, 4:21.

Fourth quarter

- DET – Mikhael Ricks 1-yard pass from Joey Harrington (Jason Hanson kick), 10:46. Packers 40–14. Drive: 5 plays, 65 yards, 1:56.

Top passers

- DET – Joey Harrington – 20/44, 236 yards, 2 TD, 2 INT
- GB – Brett Favre – 26/39, 351 yards, 2 TD

Top rushers

- DET – James Stewart – 15 rushes, 122 yards
- GB – Najeh Davenport – 10 rushes, 73 yards, TD

Top receivers

- DET – Az-Zahir Hakim – 7 receptions, 143 yards, TD
- GB – Donald Driver – 11 receptions, 130 yards

==== Week 11: vs. New York Jets ====
Week 11: New York Jets (4–5) at Detroit Lions (3–6) – Game summary

Quarter	1	2	3	4	Total
Jets	7	6	8	10	31
Lions	0	7	7	0	14

at Ford Field, Detroit, Michigan

- Date: November 17, 2002
- Game time: 4:15 p.m.
- Game weather: None (indoor stadium)
- Game attendance: 61,720
- Referee: Johnny Grier (23)
- TV announcers (CBS): Ian Eagle and Solomon Wilcots
- Recap, Game Book

Game information

First quarter

- NYJ – Santana Moss 10-yard pass from Chad Pennington (John Hall kick), 6:30. Jets 7–0. Drive: 12 plays, 80 yards, 6:16.

Second quarter

- NYJ – Wayne Chrebet 15-yard pass from Chad Pennington (kick blocked), 14:20. Jets 13–0. Drive: 7 plays, 77 yards, 4:47.
- DET – Bill Schroeder 37-yard pass from Joey Harrington (Jason Hanson kick), 11:20. Jets 13–7. Drive: 6 plays, 78 yards, 3:19.

Third quarter

- DET – Bill Schroeder 7-yard pass from Joey Harrington (Jason Hanson kick), 7:15. Lions 14–13. Drive: 8 plays, 80 yards, 4:32.
- NYJ – Wayne Chrebet 4-yard pass from Chad Pennington (Chad Pennington–Laveranues Coles pass), 0:41. Jets 21–14. Drive: 12 plays, 66 yards, 6:34.

Fourth quarter

- NYJ – John Hall 22-yard field goal, 11:20. Jets 24–14. Drive: 7 plays, 43 yards, 3:32.
- NYJ – Anthony Becht 1-yard pass from Chad Pennington (John Hall kick), 3:50. Jets 31–14. Drive: 10 plays, 77 yards, 6:26.

Top passers

- NYJ – Chad Pennington – 21/26, 229 yards, 4 TD, INT
- DET – Joey Harrington – 15/30, 171 yards, 2 TD, INT

Top rushers

- NYJ – Curtis Martin – 22 rushes, 112 yards
- DET – James Stewart – 15 rushes, 93 yards

Top receivers

- NYJ – Laveranues Coles – 7 receptions, 114 yards
- DET – Bill Schroeder – 3 receptions, 57 yards, 2 TD

==== Week 12: at Chicago Bears ====
Week 12: Detroit Lions (3–7) at Chicago Bears (2–8) – Game summary

Quarter	1	2	3	4	OT	Total
Lions	0	3	14	0	0	17
Bears	0	7	0	10	3	20

at Memorial Stadium, Champaign, Illinois

- Date: November 24, 2002
- Game time: 1:00 p.m.
- Game weather: Partly cloudy 45 °F (7 °C)
- Game attendance: 62,375
- Referee: Tony Corrente (99)
- TV announcers (FOX): Pat Summerall, Brian Baldinger and Dan Jiggetts
- Recap, Game Book

Game information

First quarter

- No scoring plays.

Second quarter

- CHI – Marcus Robinson 3-yard pass from Chris Chandler (Paul Edinger kick), 13:42. Bears 7–0. Drive: 5 plays, 14 yards, 2:18.
- DET – Jason Hanson 22-yard field goal, 5:46. Bears 7–3. Drive: 13 plays, 74 yards, 5:42.

Third quarter

- DET – Germane Crowell 1-yard pass from Joey Harrington (Jason Hanson kick), 5:09. Lions 10–7. Drive: 15 plays, 69 yards, 8:05.
- DET – James Stewart 23-yard run (Jason Hanson kick), 2:38. Lions 17–7. Drive: 4 plays, 35 yards, 1:35.

Fourth quarter

- CHI – Dez White 23-yard pass from Jim Miller (Paul Edinger kick), 2:33. Lions 17–14. Drive: 12 plays, 91 yards, 3:46.
- CHI – Paul Edinger 22-yard field goal, 0:00. Tied 17–17. Drive: 10 plays, 43 yards, 1:56.

Overtime

- CHI – Paul Edinger 40-yard field goal, 8:58. Bears 20–17. Drive: 13 plays, 43 yards, 6:02.

Top passers

- DET – Joey Harrington – 21/40, 213 yards, TD, INT
- CHI – Jim Miller – 21/35, 250 yards, TD

Top rushers

- DET – James Stewart – 22 rushes, 85 yards, TD
- CHI – Anthony Thomas – 14 rushes, 40 yards

Top receivers

- DET – Scotty Anderson – 5 receptions, 70 yards
- CHI – Marty Booker – 10 receptions, 157 yards

After winning the coin toss to begin overtime, because of the windy conditions, Marty Mornhinweg chose to have the Lions kick off instead of receive, affectionately known as "taking the wind". This decision backfired after the Bears took the ball and kicked a field goal on their drive. It was later mocked by Chris Berman on Monday Night Countdown the next night.

==== Week 13: vs. New England Patriots ====
Week 13: New England Patriots (6–5) at Detroit Lions (3–8) – Game summary

Quarter	1	2	3	4	Total
Patriots'	10	7	0	3	20
Lions	3	3	3	3	12

at Ford Field, Detroit, Michigan

- Date: November 28, 2002
- Game time: 12:30 pm
- Game weather: None (indoor stadium)
- Game attendance: 62,109
- Referee: Larry Nemmers (20)
- TV announcers (CBS): Greg Gumbel and Phil Simms
- Recap, Game Book

Game information

First quarter

- NE – Adam Vinatieri 31-yard field goal, 10:06. Patriots 3–0. Drive: 10 plays, 62 yards, 4:54.
- NE – Tedy Bruschi 27-yard interception return (Adam Vinatieri kick), 9:44. Patriots 10–0.
- DET – Jason Hanson 23-yard field goal, 0:08. Patriots 10–3. Drive: 12 plays, 77 yards, 6:04.

Second quarter

- NE – Antowain Smith 1-yard run (Adam Vinatieri kick), 2:24. Patriots 17–3. Drive: 4 plays, 19 yards, 1:42.
- DET – Jason Hanson 45-yard field goal, 0:30. Patriots 17–6. Drive: 11 plays, 53 yards, 1:54.

Third quarter

- DET – Jason Hanson 39-yard field goal, 4:12. Patriots 17–9. Drive: 13 plays, 64 yards, 5:51.

Fourth quarter

- NE – Adam Vinatieri 29-yard field goal, 13:17. Patriots 20–9. Drive: 12 plays, 64 yards, 5:55.
- DET – Jason Hanson 46-yard field goal, 9:46. Patriots 20–12. Drive: 9 plays, 33 yards, 3:31.

Top passers

- NE – Tom Brady – 18/30, 210 yards, INT
- DET – Joey Harrington – 22/44, 210 yards, 3 INT

Top rushers

- NE – Antowain Smith – 25 rushes, 80 yards, TD
- DET – James Stewart – 13 rushes, 57 yards

Top receivers

- NE – Troy Brown – 10 receptions, 111 yards
- DET – Germane Crowell – 5 receptions, 46 yards

==== Week 14: at Arizona Cardinals ====
Week 14: Detroit Lions at Arizona Cardinals

Quarter	1	2	3	4	OT	Total
Lions	14	3	3	0	0	20
Cardinals	7	7	3	3	3	23

at Sun Devil Stadium, Tempe, Arizona

- Date: December 8, 2002
- Game time: 4:05 p.m.
- Game weather: Sunny, 67 °F (19 °C)
- Game attendance: 28,640
- Referee: Gerald Austin (34)
- TV announcers (FOX): Ron Pitts, Dwight Clark, and Kevin McCabe
- Recap, Box Score

Game information

First quarter

- DET – Eddie Drummond 73-yard punt return (Jason Hanson kick), 13:15. Lions 7–0.
- ARI – Joel Makovicka 1-yard pass from Jake Plummer (Bill Gramatica kick), 9:47. Tied 7–7. Drive: 7 plays, 43 yards, 3:28.
- DET – Mikhael Ricks 6-yard pass from Joey Harrington (Jason Hanson kick), 0:05. Lions 14–7. Drive: 6 plays, 45 yards, 3:06.

Second quarter

- DET – Jason Hanson 26-yard field goal, 3:20. Lions 17–7. Drive: 4 plays, 12 yards, 2:12.
- ARI – Nate Poole 10-yard pass from Jake Plummer (Bill Gramatica kick), 0:38. Lions 17–14. Drive: 3 plays, 17 yards, 0:56.

Third quarter

- DET – Jason Hanson 20-yard field goal, 10:48. Lions 20–14. Drive: 8 plays, 24 yards, 4:12.
- ARI – Bill Gramatica 29-yard field goal, 5:18. Lions 20–17. Drive: 10 plays, 64 yards, 5:30.

Fourth quarter

- ARI – Bill Gramatica 41-yard field goal, 3:23. Tied 20–20. Drive: 13 plays, 40 yards, 5:38.

Overtime

- ARI – Bill Gramatica 42-yard field goal, 10:48. Cardinals 23–20. Drive: 7 plays, 34 yards, 4:12.

Top passers

- DET – Joey Harrington – 20/37, 152 yards, TD
- ARI – Jake Plummer – 24/43, 228 yards, 2 TD, INT

Top rushers

- DET – James Stewart – 13 rushes, 52 yards
- ARI – Marcel Shipp – 25 rushes, 85 yards

Top receivers

- DET – James Stewart – 3 receptions, 34 yards
- ARI – Kevin Kasper – 3 receptions, 49 yards

==== Week 15: vs. Tampa Bay Buccaneers ====
Week 15: Tampa Bay Buccaneers at Detroit Lions

Quarter	1	2	3	4	Total
Buccaneers	3	10	0	10	23
Lions	0	10	3	7	20

at Ford Field, Detroit, Michigan

- Date: December 15, 2002
- Game time: 1:00 pm
- Game weather: None (indoor stadium)
- Game attendance: 61,942
- Referee: Tom White (123)
- TV announcers (Fox): Curt Menefee, Tim Ryan, and Jennifer Hammond
- Recap, Game Book

Game information

First quarter

- TB – Martin Gramatica 20-yard field goal, 10:43. Buccaneers 3–0. Drive: 8 plays, 24 yards, 4:17.

Second quarter

- TB – Mike Alstott 1-yard run (Martin Gramatica kick), 14:17. Buccaneers 10–0. Drive: 12 plays, 96 yards, 6:32.
- DET – Bill Schroeder 18-yard pass from Mike McMahon (Jason Hanson kick), 11:24. Buccaneers 10–7. Drive: 6 plays, 79 yards, 2:53.
- DET – Jason Hanson 37-yard field goal, 5:35. Tied 10–10. Drive: 6 plays, 43 yards, 3:06.
- TB – Martin Gramatica 28-yard field goal, 0:17. Buccaneers 13–10. Drive: 14 plays, 67 yards, 5:18.

Third quarter

- DET – Jason Hanson 25-yard field goal, 12:02. Tied 13–13. Drive: 5 plays, 49 yards, 2:58.

Fourth quarter

- TB – Michael Pittman 4-yard run (Martin Gramatica kick), 10:08. Buccaneers 20–13. Drive: 6 plays, 58 yards, 3:04.
- DET – Mike McMahon 2-yard run (Jason Hanson kick), 9:44. Tied 20–20. Drive: 1 play, 2 yards, 0:24.
- TB – Martin Gramatica 38-yard field goal, 3:04. Buccaneers 23–20. Drive: 9 plays, 46 yards, 3:55.

Top passers

- TB – Brad Johnson – 24/41, 253 yards
- DET – Mike McMahon – 10/21, 158 yards, TD, INT

Top rushers

- TB – Mike Alstott – 11 rushes, 47 yards, TD
- DET – Aveion Cason – 10 rushes, 62 yards

Top receivers

- TB – Keyshawn Johnson – 6 receptions, 90 yards
- DET – Bill Schroeder – 4 receptions, 96 yards, TD

==== Week 16: at Atlanta Falcons ====
Week 16: Detroit Lions at Atlanta Falcons

Quarter	1	2	3	4	Total
Lions	0	0	0	15	15
Falcons	3	10	6	17	36

at Georgia Dome, Atlanta, Georgia

- Date: December 22, 2002
- Game time: 1:00 p.m.
- Game weather: none (indoor stadium)
- Game attendance: 69,307
- Referee: Walt Coleman (65)
- TV announcers (FOX): Dick Stockton, Daryl Johnston, and Ron Pitts
- Recap, Game Book

Game information

First quarter

- ATL – Jay Feely 23-yard field goal, 7:50. Falcons 3–0. Drive: 12 plays, 85 yards, 5:35.

Second quarter

- ATL – Jay Feely 23-yard field goal, 6:06. Falcons 6–0. Drive: 11 plays, 80 yards, 5:08.
- ATL – Quentin McCord 20-yard pass from Michael Vick (Jay Feely kick), 0:17. Falcons 13–0. Drive: 7 plays, 63 yards, 0:59.

Third quarter

- ATL – Jay Feely 36-yard field goal, 10:56. Falcons 16–0. Drive: 8 plays, 63 yards, 4:04.
- ATL – Jay Feely 20-yard field goal, 7:20. Falcons 19–0. Drive: 5 plays, 20 yards, 2:38.

Fourth quarter

- ATL – Jay Feely 39-yard field goal, 13:31. Falcons 22–0. Drive: 11 plays, 64 yards, 5:25.
- DET – James Stewart 1-yard pass from Mike McMahon (Mike McMahon-Bill Schroeder pass), 9:53. Falcons 22–8. Drive: 6 plays, 15 yards, 3:38.
- DET – Aveion Cason 15-yard pass from Mike McMahon (Jason Hanson kick), 9:31. Falcons 22–15. Drive: 2 plays, 15 yards, 0:10.
- ATL – Warrick Dunn 3-yard run (Jay Feely kick), 3:49. Falcons 29–15. Drive: 10 plays, 88 yards, 5:42.
- ATL – Brian Finneran 34-yard pass from Michael Vick (Jay Feely kick), 1:51. Falcons 36–15. Drive: 4 plays, 37 yards, 1:36.

Top passers

- DET – Mike McMahon – 11/33, 149 yards, 2 TD, 3 INT
- ATL – Michael Vick – 20/38, 337 yards, 2 TD, INT

Top rushers

- DET – James Stewart – 12 rushes, 34 yards
- ATL – Warrick Dunn – 30 rushes, 132 yards, TD

Top receivers

- DET – Bill Schroeder – 2 receptions, 60 yards
- ATL – Quentin McCord – 7 receptions, 182 yards, TD

==== Week 17: vs. Minnesota Vikings ====
Week 17: Minnesota Vikings (5–10) at Detroit Lions (3–12) – Game summary

Quarter	1	2	3	4	Total
Vikings	14	14	7	3	38
Lions	14	3	7	12	36

at Ford Field, Detroit, Michigan

- Date: December 29, 2002
- Game time: 1:00 pm
- Game weather: None (indoor stadium)
- Game attendance: 60,223
- Referee: Bill Carollo (63)
- TV announcers (Fox): Drew Goodman, Sean Jones, and Jennifer Hammond
- Recap, Game Book

Game information

First quarter

- DET – Aveion Cason 23-yard pass from Mike McMahon (Jason Hanson kick), 11:56. Lions 7–0. Drive: 7 plays, 61 yards, 3:04.
- MIN – Daunte Culpepper 2-yard run (Gary Anderson kick), 3:53. Tied 7–7. Drive: 14 plays, 69 yards, 8:03
- MIN – Corey Chavous 43-yard interception return (Gary Anderson kick), 3:00. Vikings 14–7.
- DET – Bill Schroeder 16-yard pass from Mike McMahon (Jason Hanson kick), 0:08. Tied 14–14. Drive: 6 plays, 71 yards, 2:52.

Second quarter

- MIN – Michael Bennett 2-yard run (Gary Anderson kick), 11:49. Vikings 21–14. Drive: 6 plays, 78 yards, 3:19.
- MIN – Kelly Campbell 10-yard pass from Daunte Culpepper (Gary Anderson kick), 5:54. Vikings 28–14. Drive: 5 plays, 84 yards, 2:22
- DET – Jason Hanson 37-yard field goal, 1:50. Vikings 28–17. Drive: 9 plays, 43 yards, 4:04.

Third quarter

- DET – Robert Porcher 0-yard fumble return (Jason Hanson kick), 5:41. Vikings 28–24.
- MIN – Kelly Campbell 27-yard pass from Daunte Culpepper (Gary Anderson kick), 0:58. Vikings 35–24. Drive: 7 plays, 73 yards, 4:43

Fourth quarter

- DET – Todd Lyght 75-yard blocked field goal return (pass failed), 10:56. Vikings 35–30.
- MIN – Gary Anderson 18-yard field goal, 1:09. Vikings 38–30. Drive: 13 plays, 72 yards, 6:40.
- DET – Scotty Anderson 20-yard pass from Mike McMahon (pass failed), 0:13. Vikings 38–36. Drive: 7 plays, 61 yards, 0:56.

Top passers

- MIN – Daunte Culpepper – 21/29, 312 yards, 2 TD, INT
- DET – Mike McMahon – 19/44, 293 yards, 3 TD, 3 INT

Top rushers

- MIN – Michael Bennett – 19 rushes, 82 yards, TD
- DET – Mike McMahon – 3 rushes, 43 yards

Top receivers

- MIN – Randy Moss – 6 receptions, 109 yards
- DET – Bill Schroeder – 6 receptions, 132 yards, TD

=== Standings ===
==== Division ====
NFC North
	W	L	T	PCT	DIV	CONF	PF	PA	STK
^{(3)} Green Bay Packers	12	4	0	.750	5–1	9–3	398	328	L1
Minnesota Vikings	6	10	0	.375	4–2	5–7	390	442	W3
Chicago Bears	4	12	0	.250	2–4	3–9	281	379	L2
Detroit Lions	3	13	0	.188	1–5	3–9	306	451	L8

==== Conference ====
NFC
#	Team	Division	W	L	T	PCT	DIV	CONF	SOS	SOV
Division leaders
1 (Note: Philadelphia finished ahead of Tampa Bay and Green Bay based on conference record (11–1 vs 9–3/9–3).)	Philadelphia Eagles	East	12	4	0	.750	5–1	11–1	.469	.432
2 (Note: Tampa Bay finished ahead of Green Bay based on head-to-head victory.)	Tampa Bay Buccaneers	South	12	4	0	.750	4–2	9–3	.482	.432
3	Green Bay Packers	North	12	4	0	.750	5–1	9–3	.451	.414
4	San Francisco 49ers	West	10	6	0	.625	5–1	8–4	.504	.450
Wild Cards
5	New York Giants	East	10	6	0	.625	5–1	8–4	.482	.450
6	Atlanta Falcons	South	9	6	1	.594	4–2	7–5	.494	.429
Did not qualify for the postseason
7	New Orleans Saints	South	9	7	0	.563	3–3	7–5	.498	.566
8 (Note: St. Louis finished ahead of Seattle based on division record (4–2 to 2–4).)	St. Louis Rams	West	7	9	0	.438	4–2	5–7	.508	.446
9	Seattle Seahawks	West	7	9	0	.438	2–4	5–7	.506	.433
10 (Note: Washington finished ahead of Carolina based on common games (2–3 to 1–4))	Washington Redskins	East	7	9	0	.438	1–5	4–8	.527	.438
11	Carolina Panthers	South	7	9	0	.438	1–5	4–8	.486	.357
12	Minnesota Vikings	North	6	10	0	.375	4–2	5–7	.498	.417
13 (Note: Arizona finished ahead of Dallas based on head-to-head victory.)	Arizona Cardinals	West	5	11	0	.313	1–5	5–7	.500	.400
14	Dallas Cowboys	East	5	11	0	.313	1–5	3–9	.500	.475
15	Chicago Bears	North	4	12	0	.250	2–4	3–9	.521	.430
16	Detroit Lions	North	3	13	0	.188	1–5	3–9	.494	.375
Tiebreakers (Note: When breaking ties for three or more teams under the NFL's rules, they are first broken within divisions, then comparing only the highest-ranked remaining team from each division.)
