= List of Grambling State Tigers in the NFL draft =

This is a list of Grambling State Tigers football players in the NFL draft.

== Key ==
B	Back	K	Kicker	NT	Nose tackle
C	Center	LB	Linebacker	FB	Fullback
DB	Defensive back	P	Punter	HB	Halfback
DE	Defensive end	QB	Quarterback	WR	Wide receiver
DT	Defensive tackle	RB	Running back	G	Guard
E	End	T	Offensive tackle	TE	Tight end

= Pro Bowler
= Hall of Famer

== Selections ==
Year	Round	Pick	Overall	Player	Team	Position
1955	19	4	221	Bob Carter	Green Bay Packers	T
1956	15	12	181	Willie Davis	Cleveland Browns	DE
1957	26	1	302	Al Richardson	Philadelphia Eagles	T
1957	26	11	312	Gehrig Harris	Chicago Bears	B
1958	19	10	227	Ronnie Mushatt	San Francisco 49ers	C
1959	16	11	191	Jamie Caleb	Cleveland Browns	RB
1961	4	6	48	Ernie Ladd	Chicago Bears	T
1961	7	13	97	Preston Powell	Cleveland Browns	B
1962	11	7	147	Jerry Robinson	Chicago Bears	RB
1962	11	11	151	Clifton McNeil	Cleveland Browns	E
1962	17	14	238	Buck Buchanan	Green Bay Packers	T
1963	1	1	1	Buck Buchanan	Kansas City Chiefs	DT
1963	15	13	209	Lane Howell	New York Giants	C
1963	19	13	265	Buck Buchanan	New York Giants	DT
1964	15	1	197	Jim Griffin	San Francisco 49ers	E
1964	18	11	249	Jim Garrett	New York Giants	B
1965	2	10	24	Alphonse Dotson	Green Bay Packers	T
1965	8	1	99	Willie Williams	New York Giants	B
1965	8	13	111	Mike Howell	Cleveland Browns	DB
1965	11	4	144	Frank Cornish Jr.	Chicago Bears	T
1966	4	2	50	Henry Dyer	Los Angeles Rams	RB
1966	7	14	109	Leroy Carter	Cleveland Browns	WR
1966	11	3	158	Charley Washington	Pittsburgh Steelers	RB
1966	20	12	302	Goldie Sellers	Chicago Bears	WR
1967	3	1	54	Norman Davis	Baltimore Colts	T
1967	4	12	92	Julian Gray	New York Jets	DB
1967	5	10	117	Louis Jackson	New York Jets	DB
1967	10	2	239	Dick Stebbins	New York Giants	WR
1968	2	15	42	Bob Atkins	St. Louis Cardinals	DB
1968	6	18	156	Essex Johnson	Cincinnati Bengals	DB
1968	7	27	192	Wes Bean	Cincinnati Bengals	LB
1968	11	15	288	Henry Davis	New York Giants	DE
1968	12	27	327	Harold Jones	Cincinnati Bengals	T
1969	4	15	93	Charlie Joiner	Houston Oilers	WR
1969	8	10	192	James Harris	Buffalo Bills	QB
1969	9	9	217	Henry Jones	Denver Broncos	RB
1969	9	13	221	Ed Watson	Houston Oilers	LB
1969	9	16	224	Hilton Crawford	San Francisco 49ers	DB
1969	12	6	292	Richard Lee	Boston Patriots	DT
1969	13	16	333	Roger Williams	Los Angeles Rams	DB
1969	17	6	422	George Muse	Boston Patriots	LB
1970	3	15	67	Glenn Alexander	Buffalo Bills	DB
1970	4	10	88	Delles Howell	New Orleans Saints	DB
1970	5	18	122	Billy Newsome	Baltimore Colts	DE
1970	11	5	265	Terry Williams	Buffalo Bills	RB
1970	11	6	266	Samuel Wallace	Cincinnati Bengals	T
1970	11	26	285	Bill O'Neal	Kansas City Chiefs	RB
1970	12	7	293	Robert Jones	Philadelphia Eagles	DT
1970	16	10	400	Cliff Gasper	New Orleans Saints	DT
1970	17	13	429	Walter Breaux	New York Giants	DT
1971	1	5	5	Richard Harris	Philadelphia Eagles	DE
1971	1	8	8	Frank Lewis	Pittsburgh Steelers	WR
1971	2	5	31	Sam Holden	New Orleans Saints	G
1971	2	16	42	Scott Lewis	Kansas City Chiefs	DE
1971	2	20	46	Virgil Robinson	Green Bay Packers	RB
1971	4	2	80	Joe Carter	Dallas Cowboys	TE
1971	5	5	109	Willie Armstrong	Houston Oilers	RB
1971	17	18	434	Coleman Zeno	New York Giants	WR
1972	3	3	55	John Mendenhall	New York Giants	DT
1972	3	23	75	Solomon Freelon	Houston Oilers	G
1972	4	16	94	Andrew Howard	Atlanta Falcons	DT
1972	11	15	275	Jack Phillips	Atlanta Falcons	WR
1973	8	8	190	Lee Fobbs	Buffalo Bills	RB
1973	10	6	240	Matthew Reed	Buffalo Bills	QB
1973	15	21	385	Walt Baisy	Dallas Cowboys	LB
1973	17	14	430	John Billizon	New York Giants	DE
1974	5	20	124	Charles Battle	New England Patriots	DE
1974	6	23	153	Bill Bryant	Cincinnati Bengals	DB
1974	8	2	184	Ezil Bibbs	New York Giants	DE
1974	15	4	368	Oliver Alexander	Chicago Bears	TE
1975	1	8	8	Gary Johnson	San Diego Chargers	DT
1975	2	25	51	Bob Barber	Pittsburgh Steelers	DE
1975	6	16	146	Jesse O'Neal	Houston Oilers	DE
1976	1	10	10	James Hunter	Detroit Lions	DB
1976	2	26	54	Sammy White	Minnesota Vikings	WR
1976	4	7	99	Mike St. Clair	Cleveland Browns	DE
1976	4	21	113	Ron Singleton	San Diego Chargers	TE
1976	5	31	155	Dwight Scales	Los Angeles Rams	WR
1976	6	12	168	Robert Pennywell	San Francisco 49ers	LB
1976	8	20	229	Bobby Simon	Houston Oilers	T
1976	10	13	278	Art Gilliam	Denver Broncos	DE
1978	1	17	17	Doug Williams	Tampa Bay Buccaneers	QB
1978	3	21	77	Carlos Pennywell	New England Patriots	WR
1978	5	24	134	Robert Woods	Kansas City Chiefs	WR
1979	3	21	77	Bruce Radford	Denver Broncos	DE
1979	4	19	101	Charles Johnson	Atlanta Falcons	DB
1980	7	7	172	Mike Smith	Atlanta Falcons	WR
1980	11	9	286	Joe Gordon	Buffalo Bills	DT
1981	10	2	250	Mike Barker	New York Giants	DT
1981	10	20	268	Robert Parham	San Diego Chargers	RB
1982	6	27	166	Arthur King	Cincinnati Bengals	DE
1983	3	5	61	Albert Lewis	Kansas City Chiefs	DB
1983	6	1	141	Trumaine Johnson	San Diego Chargers	WR
1984	6	6	146	Rufus Stevens	Kansas City Chiefs	WR
1984u	2	12	40	Robert Smith	Minnesota Vikings	DE
1986	3	8	63	Leonard Griffin	Kansas City Chiefs	DE
1987	4	17	101	Sean Smith	Chicago Bears	DE
1987	10	5	256	Anthony Anderson	San Diego Chargers	DB
1987	11	3	282	Patrick Scott	Green Bay Packers	WR
1987	11	11	290	Arthur Wells	New Orleans Saints	TE
1987	11	22	301	Calvin Nicholas	San Francisco 49ers	WR
1988	8	2	195	Curtis Maxey	Cincinnati Bengals	DT
1988	12	27	332	Johnny Carter	Denver Broncos	DT
1989	8	4	199	Bryan Tobey	Kansas City Chiefs	RB
1990	4	15	96	Fred Jones	Kansas City Chiefs	WR
1990	11	20	296	Clemente Gordon	Cleveland Browns	QB
1991	3	13	68	Jake Reed	Minnesota Vikings	WR
1991	6	10	149	Walter Dean	Green Bay Packers	RB
1991	7	11	178	Franklin Thomas	Detroit Lions	TE
1991	9	8	231	Darryl Milburn	Detroit Lions	DE
1991	10	24	274	Andrew Glover	Los Angeles Raiders	TE
1992	11	12	292	Nate Singleton	New York Giants	WR
1993	5	12	124	Herman Arvie	Cleveland Browns	T
1993	8	19	215	Stevie Anderson	Phoenix Cardinals	WR
1994	7	25	219	Tracy Greene	Kansas City Chiefs	TE
1995	5	19	153	Roderick Mullen	New York Giants	DB
1995	7	9	217	Curtis Ceaser	New York Jets	WR
2001	5	17	148	Scotty Anderson	Detroit Lions	WR
2005	7	13	227	Kenneth Pettway	Houston Texans	LB
2006	3	28	92	Jason Hatcher	Dallas Cowboys	DE
2017	3	33	98	Chad Williams	Arizona Cardinals	WR

== Notes ==
Robert Smith was drafted into the 1984 NFL Supplemental Draft.
