= 1999 Detroit Lions season =

70th season in franchise history

- Owner: William Clay Ford Sr.
- General manager: Chuck Schmidt
- Head coach: Bobby Ross
- Offensive coordinator: Sylvester Croom
- Defensive coordinator: Larry Peccatiello
- Home stadium: Pontiac Silverdome

Results
- Record: 8–8
- Division place: 3rd NFC Central
- Playoffs: Lost Wild Card Playoffs (at Redskins) 13–27
- All-Pros: None
- Pro Bowlers: 5: TE David Sloan; DT Luther Elliss; DE Robert Porcher; LB Stephen Boyd; K Jason Hanson

Uniform

The 1999 season was the Detroit Lions' 70th in the National Football League (NFL). They finished the season with an 8–8 record, an improvement on their 5–11 record from the previous season, and qualified for the playoffs as the third-placed team in the NFC Central. It was their sixth playoff appearance of the decade, capping one of the most successful 10-year stretches in franchise history.

In 2004, Football Outsiders' Mike Tanier named the 1999 Lions as one of the "worst playoff teams ever".

The Lions had just lost Barry Sanders to an abrupt retirement and started the season with second-year pro Charlie Batch at quarterback before he was lost to an injury and replaced by Gus Frerotte.

The team won six of their first eight games, including a victory over the eventual Super Bowl champion St. Louis Rams, which made the Lions a surprise contender at the midway point of the season; however, they managed only two more wins in the second half of the season and lost their final four games.

== Offseason ==
=== 1999 expansion draft ===
Lions selected during the expansion draft
Pick	Name	Position	Expansion team
1	Jim Pyne	Center	Cleveland Browns
36	Jerris McPhail	Running back	Cleveland Browns

=== NFL draft ===
1999 Detroit Lions draft
Round	Pick	Player	Position	College	Notes
1	9	Chris Claiborne	LB	USC	
1	27	Aaron Gibson	OT	Wisconsin	from Miami
3	70	Jared DeVries	DE	Iowa	from Miami
4	103	Sedrick Irvin	RB	Michigan State	
5	137	Tyree Talton	S	Northern Iowa	from Philadelphia
6	177	Clint Kriewaldt	LB	Wisconsin-Stevens Point	
7	215	Mike Pringley	DE	North Carolina	
Made roster * Made at least one Pro Bowl during career

Notes

- Detroit traded up from its second-round selection (39th) with Miami, receiving Miami's first-round selection (27th), which they had received from San Francisco, in return for Detroit's third- and fifth-round selections (70th and 142nd).
- Detroit traded up from a third-round selection (72nd) received from Baltimore as part of the trade of QB Scott Mitchell with Miami to the 70th pick, giving up a seventh-round selection (232nd) in return. Detroit had received the 232nd pick from Green Bay in exchange for RB Glyn Milburn.
- Detroit traded its fourth-round selection in 2000 to Philadelphia in exchange for the Eagles' fifth-round selection (137th).

=== Undrafted free agents ===
1999 undrafted free agents of note
Player	Position	College
Nikia Codie	Safety	Baylor
Darryl Daniel	Wide receiver	Syracuse
Charles Dorsey	Defensive tackle	Auburn
Henry Douglas	Wide receiver	North Carolina A&T
Brian Gowins	Kicker	Northwestern
Joey Hall	Linebacker	Appalachian State
Donnie Hart	Wide receiver	Texas Tech
Demetrius Johnson	Cornerback	Eastern Michigan
Sorie Kanu	Safety	Michigan State
Phil Nash	Cornerback	Syracuse
Jeremy Offutt	Center	Oklahoma State
Daniel Pope	Punter	Alabama
Marek Rubin	Tackle	Yale
Joe Tuipala	Linebacker	San Diego State

== Personnel ==
=== Staff ===
1999 Detroit Lions staff
Front office: Chairman and president – William Clay Ford Sr.; Vice chairman – William Clay Ford Jr.; Executive vice president and chief operating officer – Chuck Schmidt; Vice president of player personnel – Ron Hughes; Vice president of football administration – Larry Lee; Vice president of stadium development and salary cap – Tom Lewand; Director of pro scouting – Kevin Colbert; Head coaches: Head coach – Bobby Ross; Offensive coaches: Offensive coordinator – Sylvester Croom; Quarterbacks – Jim Zorn; Running backs – Frank Falks; Wide receivers – Jerry Sullivan; Tight ends – Danny Smith; Offensive line – Jack Henry; Offensive assistant – Stan Kwan; Quality Control–Offense/Administrative Assistant – John Misciagna	Defensive coaches: Defensive coordinator – Larry Peccatiello; Defensive line – Brian Baker; Linebackers – Gary Moeller; Defensive backs – Richard Selcer; Defensive assistant – Don Clemons; Quality Control–Defense – Dennis Murphy; Special teams coaches: Special teams – Chuck Priefer; Special teams assistant – Stan Kwan; Strength and conditioning: Strength and conditioning – Bert Hill; Assistant strength and conditioning – Rob Graf

=== Roster ===
1999 Detroit Lions roster
Quarterbacks (QB): 10 Charlie Batch; 12 Gus Frerotte; 16 Cory Sauter; Running backs (RB): 21 Greg Hill; 33 Sedrick Irvin; 36 Travis Reece; 34 Ron Rivers; 30 Cory Schlesinger FB; Wide receivers (WR): 82 Germane Crowell; 18 Desmond Howard; 84 Herman Moore; 87 Johnnie Morton; 83 Brian Stablein; 80 Iheanyi Uwaezuoke PR; Tight ends (TE): 89 Walter Rasby; 86 David Sloan; 45 Ed Smith	Offensive linemen (OL): 79 Eric Beverly C; 65 Kerlin Blaise G; 76 Barrett Brooks T; 77 Mike Compton; 64 Jeff Hartings G; 76 Paul Janus T; 75 Tony Ramirez T; 74 Juan Roque T; 62 Tony Semple; Defensive linemen (DL): 95 Jared DeVries DE; 94 Luther Elliss DT; 98 James Jones DT; 67 Travis Kirschke DE; 90 Dan Owens DT; 91 Robert Porcher DE; 92 Mike Pringley DE; 93 Kelvin Pritchett DT; 97 Tracy Scroggins DE	Linebackers (LB): 55 Allen Aldridge OLB; 57 Stephen Boyd MLB; 50 Chris Claiborne OLB; 52 Scott Kowalkowski OLB; 58 Clint Kriewaldt OLB; 59 Kevin O'Neill MLB; Defensive backs (DB): 35 Robert Bailey CB; 44 Corwin Brown FS; 31 J. B. Brown CB; 39 Lamar Campbell CB/S; 27 Mark Carrier FS; 38 Andre' Dixon CB; 40 Dwayne Harper CB; 28 Ron Rice SS; 25 Tyree Talton SS/KR; 32 Bryant Westbrook CB; Special teams (ST): 4 Jason Hanson K; 19 John Jett P	Practice squad: 41 Chris Cummings CB; 51 Scott Fields LB; 60 Paul Spicer DE; 96 Henry Taylor DT; 15 Corey Thomas WR; Reserve: 24 Kevin Abrams CB (IR); 81 Pete Chryplewicz TE (IR); 23 Terry Fair (NF-Inj.); 71 Aaron Gibson T (IR); 99 Richard Jordan LB (IR); 26 Brock Olivo (IR); 72 Ray Roberts T (IR); 54 Matt Russell LB (IR); 42 Ryan Stewart CB (IR); 29 Kywin Supernaw S (IR); Rookies in italics

== Regular season ==
The season had an inauspicious beginning as future Hall of Fame running back Barry Sanders suddenly retired on the eve of training camp. Undaunted, coach Bobby Ross led the Lions to a fast start, highlighted by a Week 9 win over the then 6–1 St. Louis Rams.

The following week, Ross made a questionable decision to go for a failed two-point conversion after a touchdown against Arizona. The game ended with Detroit trailing by four points in the red zone trying to score a game-winning touchdown. The Lions would lose at Green Bay the following week, but defeat Chicago at home to get back on track.

The following week, the Lions picked up the franchise's first win vs. Washington since 1965 and snapped an 18 game losing streak, putting the team at an 8–4 and in sole possession of the second seed in the NFC. However, the Lions collapsed down the stretch and lost their last four regular season games to finish 8–8.

Two other NFC teams—the Packers and Carolina Panthers—finished 8–8, but the Lions beat the Panthers 24–9 in Week 7 and they held the conference record tiebreaker over the Packers, thus allowing Detroit to make the playoffs as the sixth seed despite losing their final four games.

This would be the Lions' last playoff appearance until the 2011 season.

=== Schedule ===
Week	Date	Opponent	Result	Record	Venue	Attendance
1	September 12	at Seattle Seahawks	**W** 28–20	1–0	Kingdome	66,238
2	September 19	**Green Bay Packers**	**W** 23–15	2–0	Pontiac Silverdome	76,202
3	September 26	at Kansas City Chiefs	**L** 21–31	2–1	Arrowhead Stadium	78,384
4	Bye					
5	October 10	San Diego Chargers	**L** 10–20	2–2	Pontiac Silverdome	61,481
6	October 17	**Minnesota Vikings**	**W** 25–23	3–2	Pontiac Silverdome	76,516
7	October 24	at Carolina Panthers	**W** 24–9	4–2	Ericsson Stadium	64,322
8	October 31	**Tampa Bay Buccaneers**	**W** 20–3	5–2	Pontiac Silverdome	63,135
9	November 7	St. Louis Rams	**W** 31–27	6–2	Pontiac Silverdome	73,224
10	November 14	at Arizona Cardinals	**L** 19–23	6–3	Sun Devil Stadium	49,600
11	November 21	at **Green Bay Packers**	**L** 17–26	6–4	Lambeau Field	59,869
12	November 25	**Chicago Bears**	**W** 21–17	7–4	Pontiac Silverdome	77,905
13	December 5	Washington Redskins	**W** 33–17	8–4	Pontiac Silverdome	77,693
14	December 12	at **Tampa Bay Buccaneers**	**L** 16–23	8–5	Raymond James Stadium	65,536
15	December 19	at **Chicago Bears**	**L** 10–28	8–6	Soldier Field	50,256
16	December 25	Denver Broncos	**L** 7–17	8–7	Pontiac Silverdome	73,158
17	January 2	at **Minnesota Vikings**	**L** 17–24	8–8	Hubert H. Humphrey Metrodome	64,103
Note: Intra-division opponents are in **bold** text.

=== Standings ===
NFC Central
	W	L	T	PCT	PF	PA	STK
^{(2)} Tampa Bay Buccaneers	11	5	0	.688	270	235	W2
^{(4)} Minnesota Vikings	10	6	0	.625	399	335	W3
^{(6)} Detroit Lions	8	8	0	.500	322	323	L4
Green Bay Packers	8	8	0	.500	357	341	W1
Chicago Bears	6	10	0	.375	272	341	L2

== Postseason ==
=== Schedule ===
Week	Date	Opponent	Result	Record	Venue	Attendance
Wild Card	January 8	at Washington Redskins	L 13–27	0–1	Jack Kent Cooke Stadium	79,411

=== Game summaries ===
==== NFC Wild Card Game: at (#3) Washington Redskins ====
NFC Wild Card Game: (#6) Detroit Lions at (#3) Washington Redskins – Game summary

Quarter	1	2	3	4	Total
Lions	0	0	0	13	13
Redskins	14	13	0	0	27

at Jack Kent Cooke Stadium, Washington D.C.

- Date: January 8
- Game time: 4:05 p.m. EST/3:05 p.m. CST
- Game weather: Partly cloudy, 45 °F or 7.2 °C
- Game attendance: 79,411
- Game Book

Game information

First quarter

- WAS – Stephen Davis 1-yard run (Brett Conway kick), 9:09. Redskins 7–0. Drive: 9 plays, 69 yards, 3:38.
- WAS – Stephen Davis 4-yard run (Brett Conway kick), 2:28. Redskins 14–0. Drive: 8 plays, 87 yards, 3:36.

Second quarter

- WAS – Brett Conway 33-yard field goal, 13:50. Redskins 17–0. Drive: 4 plays, 24 yards, 1:55.
- WAS – Brett Conway 23-yard field goal, 9:50. Redskins 20–0. Drive: 6 plays, 45 yards, 2:53.
- WAS – Albert Connell 30-yard pass from Brad Johnson (Brett Conway kick), 1:19. Redskins 27–0. Drive: 8 plays, 82 yards, 3:36.

Third quarter

- No scoring plays.

Fourth quarter

- DET – Ron Rice 94-yard return of blocked field goal (pass failed), 9:23. Redskins 27–6.
- DET – Ron Rivers 5-yard pass from Gus Frerotte (Jason Hanson kick), 0:00. Redskins 27–13. Drive: 12 plays, 90 yards, 2:35.

Top passers

- DET – Gus Frerotte – 21/46, 251 yards, TD, 2 INT
- WAS – Brad Johnson – 15/31, 174 yards, TD, 2 INT

Top rushers

- DET – Cory Schlesinger – 7 rushes, 23 yards
- WAS – Stephen Davis – 15 rushes, 119 yards, 2 TD

Top receivers

- DET – Herman Moore – 3 receptions, 69 yards
- WAS – Larry Centers – 7 receptions, 61 yards
