= Marty Mornhinweg =

American football player and coach (born 1962)

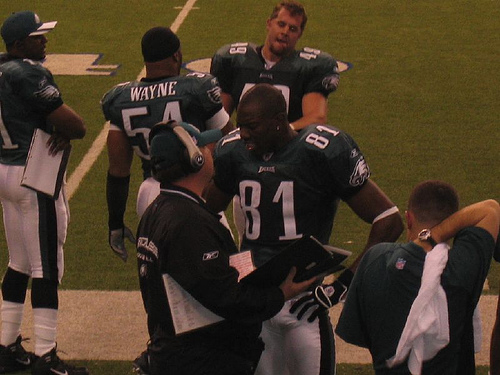
- Mornhinweg in 2004 talking to Terrell Owens

No. 11
- Position: Quarterback

Personal information
- Born: March 29, 1962 (age 64); Edmond, Oklahoma, U.S.
- Listed height: 5 ft 10 in (1.78 m)
- Listed weight: 185 lb (84 kg)

Career information
- High school: Oak Grove (San Jose, California)
- College: Montana
- NFL draft: 1985: undrafted

Career history

Playing
- Denver Dynamite (1987)

Coaching
- Montana (1985) Receivers coach; UTEP (1986–1987) Graduate assistant; Northern Arizona (1988) Running backs coach; Southeast Missouri State (1989–1990) Offensive coordinator & quarterbacks coach; Missouri (1991–1993) Tight ends & offensive line coach; Northern Arizona (1994) Offensive coordinator; Green Bay Packers (1995–1996); Offensive assistant & quality control coach (1995); Quarterbacks coach (1996); San Francisco 49ers (1997–2000) Offensive coordinator & quarterbacks coach; Detroit Lions (2001–2002) Head coach; Philadelphia Eagles (2003–2012); Senior assistant (2003); Assistant head coach (2004–2005); Assistant head coach & offensive coordinator (2006–2012); New York Jets (2013–2014) Offensive coordinator; Baltimore Ravens (2015–2018); Quarterbacks coach (2015–2016); Offensive coordinator (2016–2018); Philadelphia Eagles (2020) Senior offensive consultant

Awards and highlights
- As player: ArenaBowl champion (1987); As coach: Super Bowl champion (XXXI); NFL Conference 2004 Champion; PFWA NFL Assistant Coach of the Year (2010)

Head coaching record
- Career: 5–27 (.156)
- Coaching profile at Pro Football Reference
- Stats at ArenaFan.com

Marty Mornhinweg (born March 29, 1962) is an American football coach and former player who was most recently a senior offensive consultant for the Philadelphia Eagles of the National Football League (NFL). He was the offensive coordinator for the San Francisco 49ers from 1997 to 2000, head coach of the Detroit Lions from 2001 to 2002, offensive coordinator for the Eagles from 2006 to 2012, offensive coordinator for the New York Jets from 2013 to 2014, and offensive coordinator for the Baltimore Ravens from 2016 to 2018.

== Playing career ==
=== Early years ===
Born in Edmond, Oklahoma, Mornhinweg played high school football in San Jose, California. He led the Oak Grove Eagles to a Central Coast Section championship in 1978 with a 52–7 rout of defending champion St. Francis of Mountain View in the title game at Spartan Stadium.

Following the 1978 championship season as a junior, Mornhinweg was the 1979 Northern California Player of Year as a senior, after winning 23 consecutive games, the Eagles fell 32–29 in the semifinals to Salinas. For his performance during his time at Oak Grove, the school honored Mornhinweg and inducted him into its hall of fame.

=== College ===
Mornhinweg was a four-year starter at quarterback for the University of Montana in Missoula, established him as one of the most productive passers in program and Big Sky Conference history During his junior season in 1982, Mornhinweg led the Griz to its first Big Sky Conference championship in a dozen years.

A four-year starting quarterback for the Montana Grizzlies from 1978 to 1981, Mornhinweg set 15 individual and team passing records during his collegiate career and finished ranked first in school history and second in Big Sky Conference history in both career passing yards and total offense at the time of his graduation.

He was a two-time recipient of the Steve Carlson Award as the team’s Most Valuable Player and earned All-Big Sky honors twice, along with two honorable mention All-American selections by the Associated Press.

In addition to his on-field achievements, he was named to the First Team All-American Strength Team by the National Strength and Conditioning Association (NSCA), reflecting his physical preparation and conditioning. Mornhinweg played a central role in elevating Montana’s football program, guiding the team to a 7–3 record in 1981, which marked only the Grizzlies’ sixth winning season in the previous 32 years.

The following season, he led Montana to its first Big Sky Conference championship in 12 years and its first-ever berth in the NCAA Division I-AA playoffs, helping establish the foundation for the program’s later national prominence. He later delivered a standout performance in the 1984 Mirage Bowl in Tokyo against Army, earning Co-Offensive Player of the Game honors after passing for 425 yards and two touchdowns in an internationally staged postseason matchup.

Through Mornhinweg's performance, Montana inducted him into the Montana Hall of Fame. He earned his bachelor's degree in health and physical education/coaching, then went on to earn a master of science in health and physical education/sports administration from the University of Texas at El Paso. Mornhinweg was not selected in the 1985 NFL draft.

=== Professional ===
While a collegiate assistant coach, Mornhinweg became the starting quarterback for the Denver Dynamite in the Arena Football League in 1987. In his first start, he completed 3 of 4 passes for 30 yards and was sacked twice. Soon after, Mornhinweg blew out his knee. His team, however, went on to win the inaugural Arena Bowl I with a 45–16 victory over the Pittsburgh Gladiators.

== Coaching career ==
=== College ===
In 1985, Mornhinweg was the receivers coach at his alma mater, the University of Montana. Between 1988 and 1994, he coached at several universities, including: Northern Arizona (running backs), SE Missouri State (offensive coordinator / Quarterbacks), Missouri (tight ends and the offensive line), and again at Northern Arizona (offensive coordinator).

=== Professional ===
During 1995 and 1996, Mornhinweg coached with the Green Bay Packers, first as an offensive assistant, then as the quarterbacks coach under head coach Mike Holmgren. From 1997 to 2000, he was offensive coordinator and Quarterback Coach for the San Francisco 49ers, under Steve Mariucci.

In 2001, Mornhinweg became the head coach of the Detroit Lions, taking over a team that saw two head coaches leave in the previous season. He compiled a 5–27 record in two seasons.

His most notable moment as a head coach came in Week 12 during the 2002 season against the Chicago Bears, deciding to "take the wind" in an overtime loss.

In 2003, he joined the coaching staff of the Philadelphia Eagles. Mornhinweg masterminded the Eagles offense in the final six games of the 2006 season, and into the NFC playoffs. Coach Andy Reid gave Mornhinweg the play-calling responsibilities after the Eagles' disastrous loss to the Indianapolis Colts, 45–21. The Eagles won all six games, employing a more balanced run/pass attack. The wins included three consecutive December divisional road games, all with a back-up quarterback, Jeff Garcia. It was the only time Reid yielded play-calling responsibilities, a role Mornhinweg continued through the 2012 season, until Reid (and his staff) was fired at the end of that season. Instead of continuing to coach under Reid in Kansas City, Mornhinweg took an offensive coordinator position with the New York Jets in 2013.

On January 21, 2015, Mornhinweg was hired as quarterbacks coach for the Baltimore Ravens. On October 10, 2016, Mornhinweg was promoted from quarterbacks coach to offensive coordinator after Marc Trestman was fired.

After the 2018 season, Mornhinweg and Ravens parted ways on philosophical differences after finishing 9th in total offense and going 6-1 down the stretch to win the AFC, North Division with rookie Quarterback Lamar Jackson playing the last 7 games due to a hip injury suffered by Joe Flacco.

During his career as an offensive coordinator, Mornhinweg's offenses have finished 1st, 2nd, 4th (3 times), 5th, 9th, 10th, and 12th in total offense, and regularly highly ranked in big plays.

In all, Mornhinweg has coached a year of high school, ten years in the college ranks, and 25 years in the NFL. Throughout his coaching career, Mornhinweg has coached every position on the offensive side of the ball.

Mornhinweg has coached some of the great quarterbacks to have ever played in the NFL: Brett Favre, Steve Young, Jeff Garcia, Donovan McNabb, Nick Foles, Geno Smith, Lamar Jackson, Jalen Hurts and Michael Vick.

Mornhinweg was hired by the Eagles as a senior offensive consultant on March 5, 2020. Mornhinweg retired from the coaching career after the 2020 season.

=== Coaching Philosophy and Influence ===
Mornhinweg is known for adapting offensive schemes to maximize player strengths, particularly at the quarterback position. He has coached every offensive position during his career and was once the youngest quarterbacks coach, offensive coordinator, and head coach in the NFL. In 2010, he was named NFL Assistant Coach of the Year. He coordinated offenses that set franchise records for the San Francisco 49ers, Philadelphia Eagles, New York Jets, and Baltimore Ravens. While with the 49ers, his offense became the first team since the 1941 Chicago Bears to lead the NFL in both gross passing and rushing yards in a single season.

=== Players Coached ===
During his career, Mornhinweg coached numerous notable NFL players, including Brett Favre, Steve Young, Joe Flacco, Lamar Jackson, Jeff Garcia, Donovan McNabb, Nick Foles, Mike Vick, Geno Smith, and Jalen Hurts. Under his guidance, Favre earned an NFL MVP award and won Super Bowl XXXI, while Young and Garcia recorded some of the most productive seasons of their careers. He also coached prominent skill-position players such as Jerry Rice, Terrell Owens, DeSean Jackson, Steve Smith, Brian Westbrook, LeSean McCoy, and Mark Andrews.

=== Media career ===
Following his coaching career, Mornhinweg transitioned into football media. Since 2021, he has worked as a color commentator for Scripps Sports, contributed to radio broadcasts across multiple outlets, and appeared as an on-camera analyst for The 33rd Team.

== Honors and Recognition ==
Mornhinweg has been inducted into three halls of fame: • Oak Grove High School Hall of Fame • University of Montana Hall of Fame • State of Montana Pro Football Hall of Fame

=== Personal Contributions ===
For more than eight years, the Mornhinweg family has operated a nonprofit quarterback training program for high school athletes in the state of Montana.

== NFL head coaching record ==
| Team | Year | Regular season | | | | | Postseason | | | |
| Team | Year | Won | Lost | Ties | Win % | Finish | Won | Lost | Win % | Result |
|---|---|---|---|---|---|---|---|---|---|---|
| DET | 2001 | 2 | 14 | 0 | .125 | 5th in NFC Central | - | - | - | - |
| DET | 2002 | 3 | 13 | 0 | .188 | 4th in NFC North | - | - | - | - |
| Total | | 5 | 27 | 0 | .156 | | 0 | 0 | – | |

== Personal life ==
Mornhinweg and his wife, Lindsay have four children together.
