= Stevie Anderson =

American football player (born 1970)

No. 88, 82
- Position: Wide receiver

Personal information
- Born: May 12, 1970 (age 56); Monroe, Louisiana, U.S.
- Listed height: 6 ft 5 in (1.96 m)
- Listed weight: 215 lb (98 kg)

Career information
- High school: Jonesboro-Hodge (Jonesboro, Louisiana)
- College: Grambling State
- NFL draft: 1993: 8th round, 215th overall pick

Career history
- Phoenix Cardinals (1993)*; New York Jets (1993–1994); Arizona Cardinals (1995–1997); Baltimore Ravens (1998)*
- * Offseason or practice squad member only

Career NFL statistics
- Receptions: 16
- Receiving yards: 188
- Receiving touchdowns: 1
- Stats at Pro Football Reference

Stevie Darrell Anderson (born May 12, 1970) is an American former professional football player who was a wide receiver in the National Football League (NFL). He played college football for the Grambling State Tigers.

== College career ==
Anderson played college football at Grambling State University for four seasons. He averaged nearly 28 yards per reception over his junior and senior seasons.

== Professional career ==
Anderson was selected by the Phoenix Cardinals in the eighth round of the 1993 NFL draft with the 215th overall pick. He was cut during training camp and was later signed to the New York Jets practice squad. Anderson made the team in 1994 and caught nine passes for 90 yards. He was waived by the Jets during training camp the following season. Anderson was claimed off waivers by the Cardinals. He spent two seasons with the team before he was cut during training camp in 1997. Anderson finished his NFL career with 16 receptions for 188 yards and one touchdown.

== Personal life ==
Anderson's two of Anderson's brothers, Scotty Anderson and Anthony Anderson, both played in the NFL.
