= Anthony Anderson (defensive back) =

American football player (born 1964)

No. 24
- Position: Defensive back

Personal information
- Born: October 24, 1964 (age 62); Ruston, Louisiana, U.S.
- Listed height: 6 ft 2 in (1.88 m)
- Listed weight: 205 lb (93 kg)

Career information
- High school: Jonesboro-Hodge (Jackson Parish, Louisiana)
- College: Grambling State (1983—1986)
- NFL draft: 1987: 10th round, 256th overall pick

Career history
- San Diego Chargers (1987); Atlanta Falcons (1988)*; New Orleans Night (1991); Orlando Predators (1991)
- * Offseason or practice squad member only

Career NFL statistics
- Sacks: 0.5
- Stats at Pro Football Reference
- Stats at ArenaFan.com

Anthony Ray Anderson (born October 24, 1964) is an American former professional football player who was a defensive back for one season with the San Diego Chargers of the National Football League (NFL). He played college football for the Grambling State Tigers. He also played for the New Orleans Night and Orlando Predators of the Arena Football League (AFL).

== Early life and college ==
Anthony Ray Anderson was born on October 24, 1964, in Ruston, Louisiana. He attended Jonesboro-Hodge High School in Jackson Parish, Louisiana.

He played college football for the Grambling State Tigers from 1983 to 1986.

== Professional career ==
Pre-draft measurables
Height	Weight	Arm length	Hand span	40-yard dash	10-yard split	20-yard split	20-yard shuttle	Vertical jump	Broad jump
6 ft 1 5/8 in (1.87 m)	208 lb (94 kg)	32 1/2 in (0.83 m)	8 1/2 in (0.22 m)	4.69 s	1.65 s	2.74 s	4.48 s	31.0 in (0.79 m)	9 ft 3 in (2.82 m)
All values from NFL Combine

Anderson was selected by the San Diego Chargers in the tenth round, with the 256th overall pick, of the 1987 NFL draft. He officially signed with the team on July 28. He was released on August 29. On September 23, 1987, he was re-signed by the Chargers during the 1987 NFL players strike. Anderson played in three games for the Chargers, recording 0.5 sacks. He was released on October 19, 1987, after the strike ended.

Anderson signed with the Atlanta Falcons on February 21, 1988. He was later released on August 16, 1988.

Anderson played in two games for the New Orleans Night of the Arena Football League (AFL) in 1991, recording seven solo tackles, three interceptions, and four pass breakups. He also played three games for the AFL's Orlando Predators during the 1991 season, totaling three receptions for 31 yards and eight solo tackles. He played both offense and defense during his time in the AFL as the league played under ironman rules. Anderson was listed as a wide receiver/linebacker in the AFL.

== Personal life ==
Anderson's brothers Scotty Anderson and Stevie Anderson also played in the NFL.
