= 2001 Detroit Lions season =

72nd season in franchise history; last in the Pontiac Silverdome

- Owner: William Clay Ford Sr.
- General manager: Matt Millen
- Head coach: Marty Mornhinweg
- Offensive coordinator: Maurice Carthon
- Defensive coordinator: Vince Tobin
- Home stadium: Pontiac Silverdome

Results
- Record: 2–14
- Division place: 5th NFC Central
- Playoffs: Did not qualify
- All-Pros: None
- Pro Bowlers: DE Robert Porcher

Uniform

The 2001 Detroit Lions season was the franchise's 72nd season in the National Football League (NFL). Marty Mornhinweg was named the 21st head coach in franchise history on January 21, 2001, after owner William Clay Ford Sr. controversially fired 2000 interim coach Gary Moeller.

The season began with much optimism, with the Lions hoping to improve on their 9–7 record from 2000; however, the Lions were extremely disappointing and had the worst start to an NFL season since the 1986 Indianapolis Colts began 0–13. They were widely believed to be likely to suffer the NFL’s first 0–16 season before they defeated the Minnesota Vikings. Of the Lions' 14 losses, nine (all in a row, an NFL record)were by one possession.

Seven seasons later, the Lions went 0–16 after a week 17 loss to the Green Bay Packers.

This was the final season that the Lions played at the Pontiac Silverdome before moving to Ford Field the following season, as well as the final season for the NFC Central Division, which would dissolve following the NFL's realignment in 2002, although all NFC Central teams except the Tampa Bay Buccaneers formed the new NFC North Division.

The Lions closed the Silverdome by defeating the Dallas Cowboys 15–10 in the regular season finale. Coincidentally, the Cowboys defeated the Lions 36–10 in the first regular season game at the Silverdome (then known as Pontiac Metropolitan Stadium) in 1975.

This would also be the first season under new general manager Matt Millen, as he would be the team's general manager for the next six seasons and first 3 games of the 2008 season. This would start a stage of futility for the Lions, as they would fail to post a winning record with Millen as general manager.

== Offseason ==
Additions	Subtractions
QB Ty Detmer (Browns)	G Jeff Hartings (Steelers)
G Matt Joyce (Cardinals)	TE Walter Rasby (Redskins)
TE Pete Mitchell (Giants)	G Mike Compton (Patriots)
G Brendan Stai (Jaguars)	
CB Todd Lyght (Rams)	
CB Robert Bailey (Ravens)	

=== NFL draft ===
2001 Detroit Lions draft
Round	Pick	Player	Position	College	Notes
1	18	Jeff Backus	Offensive tackle	Michigan	
2	50	Dominic Raiola	Center	Nebraska	
2	61	Shaun Rogers *	Defensive tackle	Texas	
5	148	Scotty Anderson	Wide receiver	Grambling State	
5	149	Mike McMahon	Quarterback	Rutgers	
6	173	Jason Glenn	Linebacker	Texas A&M	
Made roster * Made at least one Pro Bowl during career

=== Undrafted free agents ===
2001 undrafted free agents of note
Player	Position	College
Neo Aoga	Quarterback	Azusa Pacific
Brad Bohn	Kicker	Utah State
Matt Childers	Defensive end	USC
Eugene Clinton	Safety	Mississippi State
Keith Cottrell	Punter	Florida State
Will Cuthbert	Tackle	Alabama
Versie Gaddis	Wide receiver	Indiana
Dennis Gibbs	Cornerback	Idaho
Toby Golliday	Defensive tackle	Mississippi State
Anthony Herron	Defensive end	Iowa
Chidi Iwuoma	Cornerback	California
Khary Jackson	Tight end	Oklahoma State
Ligarius Jennings	Cornerback	Tennessee State
Sly Johnson	Wide receiver	Miami (OH)
Loran Kaiser	Defensive tackle	Nebraska
Dustin Kroeker	Tackle	Cal Poly
Josh Lovelady	Guard	Houston
Donald Malloy	Safety	New Mexico State
Rich Mazza	Guard	Rutgers
Andre Offing	Linebacker	East Carolina
Jonathan Ordway	Cornerback	Boston College
Darnell Robinson	Linebacker	Oregon State
Wayne Rogers	Linebacker	Houston
Stephen Trejo	Fullback	Arizona State
Eric Wilson	Defensive tackle	Michigan

== Staff ==
2001 Detroit Lions staff
Front office: Owner and chairman – William Clay Ford Sr.; Vice chairman – William Clay Ford Jr.; President and chief executive officer – Matt Millen; Vice president of stadium development and salary cap – Tom Lewand; Senior director of football administration/staff counsel – Martin Mayhew; Executive director of player personnel – Bill Tobin; Director of pro personnel – Sheldon White; Director of college scouting – Russ Bolinger; Assistant director of pro personnel – Charlie Sanders; Head coaches: Head coach – Marty Mornhinweg; Offensive coaches: Offensive coordinator/running backs – Maurice Carthon; Quarterbacks – Kevin Higgins; Wide receivers – Larry Kirksey; Tight ends – Sean Kugler; Offensive line – Carl Mauck; Offensive assistant/quality control – Mike McHugh	Defensive coaches: Defensive coordinator – Vince Tobin; Defensive line – Bill Young; Assistant defensive line/pass rush specialist – Charles Haley; Linebackers – Glenn Pires; Defensive backs – Richard Selcer; Defensive assistant/quality control – Don Clemons; Special teams coaches: Special teams – Chuck Priefer; Strength and conditioning: Strength and conditioning – Jason Arapoff; Assistant strength and conditioning – Malcolm Blacken

== Roster ==
2001 Detroit Lions roster
Quarterbacks (QB): 14 Ty Detmer; 12 Scott Dreisbach; 8 Mike McMahon; Running backs (RB): 31 Aveion Cason; 21 Reuben Droughns; 26 Brock Olivo FB; 30 Cory Schlesinger FB; 34 James Stewart; 36 Stephen Trejo; 25 Lamont Warren; Wide receivers (WR): 88 Scotty Anderson; 83 Bert Emanuel; 81 Larry Foster; 80 Desmond Howard; 87 Johnnie Morton; Tight ends (TE): 89 Bradford Banta LS; 86 David Sloan	Offensive linemen (OL): 76 Jeff Backus T; 79 Eric Beverly C; 65 Kerlin Blaise G; 64 Tyrone Hopson G; 75 Matt Joyce G/T; 73 Stockar McDougle G/T; 51 Dominic Raiola C; 72 Tony Semple G; 66 Brendan Stai G; Defensive linemen (DL): 95 Jared DeVries DE; 94 Luther Elliss DT; 96 James Hall DE; 77 Anthony Herron DE; 67 Travis Kirschke DT; 91 Robert Porcher DE; 93 Kelvin Pritchett DT; 92 Shaun Rogers DT; 97 Tracy Scroggins DE	Linebackers (LB): 55 Allen Aldridge OLB; 50 Chris Claiborne MLB; 54 Barrett Green OLB; 52 Scott Kowalkowski MLB; 58 Clint Kriewaldt OLB; 59 Khari Samuel MLB; 99 Brian Williams OLB; Defensive backs (DB): 39 Lamar Campbell S; 38 Marty Carter SS; 23 Terry Fair; 40 Chidi Iwuoma CB; 24 Todd Lyght CB; 47 Ray McElroy CB/S; 45 Kurt Schulz FS; 32 Bryant Westbrook CB; 27 Jimmy Wyrick CB; Special teams (ST): 4 Jason Hanson K; 19 John Jett P	Practice squad: 15 Latef Grim WR; 60 Josh Lovelady G (IR); -- Eugene McCaslin LB; 53 Wayne Rogers LB; 46 John Waerig TE; Reserve: 35 Robert Bailey CB (IR); 10 Charlie Batch QB (IR); 42 Tommy Bennett S (Susp.); 57 Stephen Boyd LB (IR); 82 Germane Crowell WR (IR); 33 Sedrick Irvin RB (IR); 84 Herman Moore WR (IR); 28 Ron Rice S (IR); 29 Kywin Supernaw S (IR); Rookies in italics 53 active, 10 reserve, 4 practice squad

== Regular season ==
=== Schedule ===
Week	Date	Opponent	Result	Record	Venue	Recap
1	September 9	at **Green Bay Packers**	**L** 6–28	0–1	Lambeau Field	Recap
2 (Note: The Lions were originally scheduled to host the Dallas Cowboys during Week 2 of the original NFL schedule (September 16) at Pontiac Silverdome. However, due to the September 11 attacks, the game was rescheduled to Week 17.)	September 23	at Cleveland Browns	**L** 14–24	0–2	Cleveland Browns Stadium	Recap
3	Bye					
4	October 8	St. Louis Rams	**L** 0–35	0–3	Pontiac Silverdome	Recap
5	October 14	at **Minnesota Vikings**	**L** 26–31	0–4	Hubert H. Humphrey Metrodome	Recap
6	October 21	Tennessee Titans	**L** 24–27	0–5	Pontiac Silverdome	Recap
7	October 28	Cincinnati Bengals	**L** 27–31	0–6	Pontiac Silverdome	Recap
8	November 4	at San Francisco 49ers	**L** 13–21	0–7	3Com Park	Recap
9	November 11	**Tampa Bay Buccaneers**	**L** 17–20	0–8	Pontiac Silverdome	Recap
10	November 18	at Arizona Cardinals	**L** 38–45	0–9	Sun Devil Stadium	Recap
11	November 22	**Green Bay Packers**	**L** 27–29	0–10	Pontiac Silverdome	Recap
12	December 2	at **Chicago Bears**	**L** 10–13	0–11	Soldier Field	Recap
13	December 9	at **Tampa Bay Buccaneers**	**L** 12–15	0–12	Raymond James Stadium	Recap
14	December 16	**Minnesota Vikings**	**W** 27–24	1–12	Pontiac Silverdome	Recap
15	December 23	at Pittsburgh Steelers	**L** 14–47	1–13	Heinz Field	Recap
16	December 30	**Chicago Bears**	**L** 0–24	1–14	Pontiac Silverdome	Recap
17	January 6	Dallas Cowboys	**W** 15–10	2–14	Pontiac Silverdome	Recap
Note: Intra-division opponents are in **bold** text.

=== Game summaries ===
==== Week 1: at Green Bay Packers ====
Week 1: Detroit Lions at Green Bay Packers – Game summary

Quarter	1	2	3	4	Total
Lions	3	3	0	0	**6**
**Packers**	21	0	7	0	**28**

at Lambeau Field, Green Bay, Wisconsin

- Date: September 9
- Game time: 12:00 p.m. EDT/11:00 a.m. CDT
- Game weather: 60 °F (16 °C)
- Game attendance: 59,523
- Referee: Aster Sizemore
- TV announcers (FOX): Curt Menefee, Brian Baldinger, Drew Smith
- Box score

Game information

**First quarter**

- GB – Ahman Green 31-yard run (Ryan Longwell kick), 12:27. Packers 7–0. **Drive: 4 plays, 73 yards, 1:36.**
- GB – Bill Schroeder 23-yard pass from Brett Favre (Ryan Longwell kick), 6:08. Packers 14–0. **Drive: 5 plays, 65 yards, 2:46.**
- GB – Ahman Green 83-yard run (Ryan Longwell kick), 4:29. Packers 21–0. **Drive: 1 play, 83 yards, 0:14.**
- DET – Jason Hanson 49-yard field goal, 2:12. Packers 21–3. **Drive: 6 plays, 42 yards, 2:17.**

**Second quarter**

- DET – Jason Hanson 39-yard field goal, 4:06. Packers 21–6. **Drive: 10 plays, 31 yards, 4:49.**

**Third quarter**

- GB – Bubba Franks 1-yard pass from Brett Favre (Ryan Longwell kick), 3:54. Packers 28–6. **Drive: 12 plays, 75 yards, 6:47.**

**Fourth quarter**

- No scoring plays

**Top passers**

- DET – Charlie Batch – 20/39, 276 yards, 2 INT
- GB – Brett Favre – 22/28, 260 yards, 2 TD

**Top rushers**

- DET – James Stewart – 13 rushes, 39 yards
- GB – Ahman Green – 17 rushes, 157 yards, 2 TD

**Top receivers**

- DET – Johnnie Morton – 5 receptions, 111 yards
- GB – Bill Schroeder – 4 receptions, 104 yards, TD

==== Week 2: at Cleveland Browns ====
Week 2: Detroit Lions at Cleveland Browns – Game summary

Quarter	1	2	3	4	Total
Lions	0	0	7	7	**14**
**Browns**	7	7	10	0	**24**

at Cleveland Browns Stadium, Cleveland, Ohio

- Date: September 23
- Game time: 1:00 p.m. EDT
- Game weather: 66 °F (19 °C)
- Game attendance: 73,168
- Referee: Terry McAulay
- TV announcers (Fox): Kenny Albert, Tim Green
- Box score

Game information

**First quarter**

- CLE – Kevin Johnson 4-yard pass from Tim Couch (Phil Dawson kick), 8:55. Browns 7–0. **Drive: 7 plays, 57 yards, 2:50.**

**Second quarter**

- CLE – Shaun O'Hara 2-yard pass from Tim Couch (Phil Dawson kick), 13:21. Browns 14–0. **Drive: 6 plays, 53 yards, 3:36.**

**Third quarter**

- CLE – Phil Dawson 33-yard field goal, 11:36. Browns 17–0. **Drive: 4 plays, 2 yards, 0:49.**
- DET – Terry Fair 26-yard interception return (Jason Hanson kick), 7:26. Browns 17–7.
- CLE – Quincy Morgan 34-yard pass from Tim Couch (Phil Dawson kick), 4:25. Browns 24–7. **Drive: 1 play, 34 yards, 0:07.**

**Fourth quarter**

- DET – Johnnie Morton 14-yard pass from Ty Detmer (Jason Hanson kick), 11:25. Browns 24–14. **Drive: 9 plays, 84 yards, 4:13.**

**Top passers**

- DET – Ty Detmer – 22/42, 212 yards, TD, 7 INT
- CLE – Tim Couch – 12/20, 138 yards, 3 TD, 2 INT

**Top rushers**

- DET – James Stewart – 17 rushes, 71 yards
- CLE – James Jackson – 31 rushes, 124 yards

**Top receivers**

- DET – Johnnie Morton – 6 receptions, 100 yards, TD
- CLE – Quincy Morgan – 2 receptions, 38 yards, TD

Quarterback Ty Detmer made his first start for the Lions, ending the game with seven interceptions. Despite this, the Lions' defense kept the game somewhat close, picking off Cleveland quarterback Tim Couch twice, including a 26-yard pick six by cornerback Terry Fair.

==== Week 4: vs. St. Louis Rams ====
Week 4: St. Louis Rams at Detroit Lions – Game summary

Quarter	1	2	3	4	Total
**Rams**	7	14	0	14	**35**
Lions	0	0	0	0	**0**

at Pontiac Silverdome, Detroit, Michigan

- Date: October 8
- Game time: 9:00 p.m. EDT
- Game weather: None (played indoors)
- Game attendance: 77,765
- Referee: Tom White
- TV announcers (ABC): Al Michaels, Dan Fouts, and Melissa Stark
- Box score

Game information

**First quarter**

- STL – Az-Zahir Hakim 15-yard pass from Kurt Warner (Jeff Wilkins kick), 3:30. Rams 7–0. **Drive: 10 plays, 80 yards, 4:35.**

**Second quarter**

- STL – Torry Holt 36-yard pass from Kurt Warner (Jeff Wilkins kick), 13:31. Rams 14–0. **Drive: 5 plays, 70 yards, 1:57.**
- STL – Dré Bly 93-yard interception return (Jeff Wilkins kick), 3:04. Rams 21–0.

**Third quarter**

- No scoring plays

**Fourth quarter**

- STL – Ernie Conwell 1-yard pass from Kurt Warner (Jeff Wilkins kick), 10:14. Rams 28–0. **Drive: 10 plays, 63 yards, 5:53.**
- STL – Marshall Faulk 7-yard run (Jeff Wilkins kick), 4:32. Rams 35–0. **Drive: 6 plays, 45 yards, 3:54.**

**Top passers**

- STL – Kurt Warner – 29/37, 291 yards, 3 TD
- DET – Ty Detmer – 15/18, 149 yards, INT

**Top rushers**

- STL – Marshall Faulk – 14 rushes, 71 yards, TD
- DET – James Stewart – 13 rushes, 88 yards

**Top receivers**

- STL – Marshall Faulk – 9 receptions, 80 yards
- DET – Germane Crowell – 5 receptions, 65 yards

==== Week 11: vs Green Bay Packers ====
Week 11: Green Bay Packers at Detroit Lions

Quarter	1	2	3	4	Total
**Packers**	7	10	7	5	**29**
Lions	3	10	0	14	**27**

at Pontiac Silverdome, Pontiac, Michigan

- Date: November 22, 2001
- Game time: 12:36 p.m. EST
- Game weather: None (indoor stadium)
- Game attendance: 77,730
- TV announcers (Fox): Pat Summerall and John Madden

Game information

**First quarter**

**Second quarter**

**Third quarter**

**Fourth quarter**

Top passers

- GB – Brett Favre – 18/26, 252 yards, 2 TD
- DET – Charlie Batch – 8/19, 118 yards, INT

Top rushers

- GB – Ahman Green – 22 rushes, 102 yards, TD
- DET – James Stewart – 14 rushes, 102 yards

Top receivers

- GB – Antonio Freeman – 6 receptions, 89 yards, TD
- DET – Johnnie Morton – 4 receptions, 67 yards

==== Week 14: vs Minnesota Vikings ====
Week 14: Minnesota Vikings at Detroit Lions – Game summary

Quarter	1	2	3	4	Total
Vikings	7	0	17	0	**24**
**Lions**	14	6	0	7	**27**

at Pontiac Silverdome, Pontiac, Michigan

- Date: December 16
- Game time: 1:00 p.m. CDT
- Game weather: None (indoor stadium)
- Game attendance: 72,190
- Referee: Ed Hochuli (85)
- TV announcers (FOX): Kenny Albert, Tim Green and Jennifer Hammond
- Recap, Game Book

Game information

**First quarter**

- DET – Todd Lyght 59-yard interception return (Jason Hanson kick), 6:18. Lions 7–0.
- MIN – Tyrone Carter 46-yard fumble return (Gary Anderson kick), 2:11. Tied 7–7.
- DET – Mike McMahon 1-yard run (Jason Hanson kick), 0:55. Lions 14–7. **Drive: 4 plays, 71 yards, 1:16.**

**Second quarter**

- DET – Jason Hanson 44-yard field goal, 9:06. Lions 17–7. **Drive: 4 plays, 4 yards, 1:30.**
- DET – Jason Hanson 36-yard field goal, 0:00. Lions 20–7. **Drive: 10 plays, 57 yards, 2:48.**

**Third quarter**

- MIN – Gary Anderson 27-yard field goal, 12:23. Lions 20–10. **Drive: 6 plays, 24 yards, 2:37.**
- MIN – Randy Moss 66-yard pass from Todd Bouman (Gary Anderson kick), 7:12. Lions 20–17. **Drive: 4 plays, 90 yards, 2:42.**
- MIN – Randy Moss 13-yard pass from Todd Bouman (Gary Anderson kick), 1:51. Vikings 24–20. **Drive: 8 plays, 68 yards, 3:39.**

**Fourth quarter**

- DET – Cory Schlesinger 1-yard run (Jason Hanson kick), 10:36. Lions 27–24. **Drive: 13 plays, 80 yards, 6:15.**

**Top passers**

- MIN – Todd Bouman – 18/38, 243 yards, 2 TD, 2 INT
- DET – Mike McMahon – 15/28, 241 yards

**Top rushers**

- MIN – Michael Bennett – 10 rushes, 40 yards
- DET – James "Little Man" Stewart – 20 rushes, 91 yards

**Top receivers**

- MIN – Randy Moss – 7 receptions, 144 yards, 2 TD
- DET – Johnnie Morton – 4 receptions, 74 yards

==== Week 15: at Pittsburgh Steelers ====
Week 15: Detroit Lions at Pittsburgh Steelers

Quarter	1	2	3	4	Total
Lions	7	7	0	0	**14**
**Steelers**	14	13	10	10	**47**

at Heinz Field, Pittsburgh, Pennsylvania

- Date: December 23, 2001
- Game time: 1:00 p.m. EST
- Game weather: 45 °F (7 °C)
- Game attendance: 62,809
- TV announcers (Fox): Kenny Albert, Tim Green and Jennifer Hammond

Game information

**First quarter**

**Second quarter**

**Third quarter**

**Fourth quarter**

Top passers

- DET – Mike McMahon – 12/28, 118 yards, 2 TD, INT
- PIT – Kordell Stewart – 17/26, 226 yards, 3 TD

Top rushers

- DET – Lamont Warren – 9 rushes, 48 yards
- PIT – Chris Fuamatu-Ma'afala – 26 rushes, 126 yards

Top receivers

- DET – Bert Emanuel – 3 receptions, 35 yards
- PIT – Hines Ward – 7 receptions, 67 yards, TD

==== Week 17: vs Dallas Cowboys ====
Week 17: Dallas Cowboys at Detroit Lions

Quarter	1	2	3	4	Total
Cowboys	0	7	0	3	**10**
**Lions**	0	6	3	6	**15**

at Pontiac Silverdome, Pontiac, Michigan

- Date: January 6, 2002
- Game time: 1:00 p.m. EST
- Game weather: None (indoor stadium)
- Game attendance: 77,512
- TV announcers (Fox): Kenny Albert, Tim Green and Jennifer Hammond

Game information

**First quarter**

**Second quarter**

**Third quarter**

**Fourth quarter**

Top passers

- DAL – Quincy Carter – 11/26, 158 yards, INT
- DET – Ty Detmer – 24/40, 242 yards, 2 TD

Top rushers

- DAL – Emmitt Smith – 18 rushes, 77 yards, TD
- DET – James Stewart – 13 rushes, 69 yards

Top receivers

- DAL – Joey Galloway – 3 receptions, 58 yards
- DET – Johnnie Morton – 8 receptions, 86 yards, TD

=== Standings ===
NFC Central
	W	L	T	PCT	PF	PA	STK
^{(2)} Chicago Bears	13	3	0	.813	338	203	W4
^{(4)} Green Bay Packers	12	4	0	.750	390	266	W3
^{(6)} Tampa Bay Buccaneers	9	7	0	.563	324	280	L1
Minnesota Vikings	5	11	0	.313	290	390	L4
Detroit Lions	2	14	0	.125	270	424	W1
