= David Sloan (American football) =

American football player (born 1972)

No. 86, 88, 48
- Position: Tight end

Personal information
- Born: June 8, 1972 (age 54); Fresno, California, U.S.
- Listed height: 6 ft 6 in (1.98 m)
- Listed weight: 260 lb (118 kg)

Career information
- High school: Sierra (Tollhouse, California)
- College: New Mexico
- NFL draft: 1995: 3rd round, 70th overall pick

Career history
- Detroit Lions (1995–2001); New Orleans Saints (2002–2003)

Awards and highlights
- Pro Bowl (1999)

Career NFL statistics
- Receptions: 192
- Receiving yards: 2,151
- Touchdowns: 15
- Stats at Pro Football Reference

David Lyle Sloan (born June 8, 1972) is an American former professional football player and coach who was a tight end in the National Football League (NFL) for the Detroit Lions and New Orleans Saints.

== Early life ==
Sloan played football and basketball for Sierra High School in Tollhouse, California. He played tight end, linebacker as well as kicker. He was named all-North Sequoia League as a linebacker his senior season and played in the Central California All-Star football game where he contributed a 9 yard touchdown reception.

On the basketball court, Sloan earned first team all-North Sequoia League honors and was selected to play in the City-County all-star game.

== College career ==
Sloan initially bypassed football for basketball, enrolling at Fresno City College, a junior college in Fresno, California. He played basketball for the Rams as a freshman and sophomore, earning All-Conference academic honors both years and a scholarship for having the highest grade point average on the team with a 3.0.

After two seasons of basketball, Sloan failed to attract a four year college scholarship. Knowing he couldn't afford college, he decided to play football for one season at Fresno City College and played well enough to earn a scholarship to the University of New Mexico. Upon arriving in Albuquerque, he quickly impressed head coach Dennis Franchione who was pleasantly surprised by his blocking ability during spring drills and predicted he could be a future NFL draft pick.

Sloan played in every game his first season for the Lobos hauling in 13 receptions for 116 yards and 3 touchdowns. For his effort, he was awarded honorable mention All-WAC. His senior year he recorded 24 receptions for 320 yards and 1 touchdown and received first team all-WAC honors. He served as captain his senior season.

Following his senior year, Sloan participated in the Senior Bowl and Blue–Gray Football Classic where he logged 2 receptions for 37 yards and 2 receptions for 47 yards, respectively. He was also selected to participate in the NFL Scouting Combine prior to the 1995 NFL Draft.

== Professional career ==
Pre-draft measurables
Height	Weight	Arm length	Hand span	40-yard dash	10-yard split	20-yard split	20-yard shuttle	Vertical jump	Broad jump	Bench press
6 ft 6 in (1.98 m)	254 lb (115 kg)	33.5 in (0.85 m)	10.63 in (0.27 m)	4.91 s	1.73 s	2.83 s	4.29 s	31 in (0.79 m)	115 in (2.92 m)	20 reps
All values from NFL Draft combine.

Sloan was selected by the Detroit Lions in the third round (70th overall) of the 1995 NFL draft. He was the seventh tight end drafted. Sloan played for the Lions for seven seasons from 1995-2001.

Sloan's best season came in 1999 when he had 47 receptions for 591 yards and 4 touchdowns, earning him a spot on the 2000 NFC Pro Bowl team. He was the first tight end from the 1995 draft class to make a Pro Bowl, and was the first Lions tight end to make a Pro Bowl since David Hill in 1979. Sloan was also named as an alternate to the 2001 NFC Pro Bowl team.

Sloan signed a four-year, $7.05 million contract with the New Orleans Saints in 2002. He was released by the Saints following the 2003 season, and ultimately retired

During his career, Sloan dealt with numerous injuries including chronic knee and toe pain that required several surgeries. He also suffered a broken hand and had arthroscopic surgery on his shoulder.

Sloan finished his NFL career with 192 receptions for 2,151 yards and 15 touchdowns over 9 seasons.

== NFL career statistics ==
Year	Team	GP	Receiving				
Year	Team	GP	Rec	Yds	Avg	Lng	TD
1995	DET	16	17	184	10.8	24	1
1996	DET	4	7	51	7.3	18	0
1997	DET	14	29	264	9.1	25	0
1998	DET	10	11	146	13.3	33	1
1999	DET	16	47	591	12.6	74	4
2000	DET	15	32	379	11.8	59	2
2001	DET	15	37	409	11.1	27	7
2002	NO	16	12	127	10.6	29	0
Career		106	192	2,151	11.0	74	15

== Coaching career ==
In 2009, Sloan embarked on a coaching career, working as an assistant special teams and tight ends coach at Southwest Baptist University, an NCAA Division II school in Missouri. Sloan had enrolled in the NFLPA Coaching Intern program, which works with Division II/III schools to help former players begin a career in coaching.

In 2010, Sloan joined Rice University as a graduate assistant under Owls head coach David Bailiff. Baliff had previously served as an assistant coach at the University of New Mexico when Sloan was a player. He remained on staff for the 2011 season as a quality control assistant.

In 2012, Sloan was promoted to tight ends coach and assistant special teams coach. Sloan notably coached two tight ends who were both drafted in 2013: Luke Willson and Vance McDonald.

In 2014, Sloan picked up the title of recruiting coordinator in addition to coaching the tight ends. His primary recruiting area is the Dallas–Fort Worth metroplex

In 2020, Sloan is now a coach for Bellaire High School in Houston, Texas as an offensive lineman coach.

== Personal life ==
Sloan and his ex-wife have two daughters. He has since re-married. The couple have two daughters.

Sloan remains a fan of the Detroit Lions and keeps in touch with several former teammates. On September 30, 2008, he served as an honorary captain for a game against the Chicago Bears.
