= Chris Claiborne =

American football player and coach (born 1978)

No. 50, 55, 52
- Position: Linebacker

Personal information
- Born: July 26, 1978 (age 48); San Diego, California, U.S.
- Listed height: 6 ft 3 in (1.91 m)
- Listed weight: 255 lb (116 kg)

Career information
- High school: John W. North (Riverside, California)
- College: USC (1996–1998)
- NFL draft: 1999: 1st round, 9th overall pick

Career history

Playing
- Detroit Lions (1999–2002); Minnesota Vikings (2003–2004); St. Louis Rams (2005); New York Giants (2006); Jacksonville Jaguars (2007)*
- * Offseason or practice squad member only

Coaching
- Calabasas HS (2018–2019) Head coach; USC (2020) Quality control analyst; Arizona State (2021–2022) Linebackers coach; St. Louis Battlehawks (2023–2025) Linebackers coach

Awards and highlights
- NFL All-Rookie Team (1999); Unanimous All-American (1998); Dick Butkus Award (1998); Pac-10 Defensive Player of the Year (1998); 2× First-team All-Pac-10 (1997, 1998)

Career NFL statistics
- Total tackles: 562
- Sacks: 15
- Forced fumbles: 8
- Fumble recoveries: 8
- Interceptions: 8
- Defensive touchdowns: 2
- Stats at Pro Football Reference

Christopher Ashon Claiborne (born July 26, 1978) is an American football coach and former player who was a linebacker in the National Football League (NFL) for eight seasons. Claiborne played college football for the University of Southern California, and was recognized as a unanimous All-American. He was a first-round pick in the 1999 NFL draft, and played professionally for the Detroit Lions, Minnesota Vikings, St. Louis Rams, and New York Giants of the NFL.

After ending his playing career, he entered coaching at the high school level. In 2020, he returned to USC's football team as a quality control analyst and most recently was the Linebackers coach at Arizona State. He recently was the Linebackers coach for the St. Louis BattleHawks of the United Football League (UFL).

== Early life ==
Claiborne was born in San Diego, California. He attended John W. North High School in Riverside, California, and was a letterman in both football and basketball. In football, he won All-State honors at running back and linebacker as a senior under head coach Mark Paredes. Claiborne graduated from high school in 1996.

== College career ==
Claiborne accepted an athletic scholarship to attend the University of Southern California, where he played for the USC Trojans football team from 1996 to 1998. As a senior in 1998, he was recognized as a consensus first-team All-American. He is also USC's first and only Butkus award winner.

== Professional career ==
Pre-draft measurables
Height	Weight	Arm length	Hand span	40-yard dash	10-yard split	20-yard split	20-yard shuttle	Three-cone drill	Vertical jump	Broad jump	Bench press
6 ft 2 3/8 in (1.89 m)	248 lb (112 kg)	31 5/8 in (0.80 m)	8 5/8 in (0.22 m)	4.63 s	1.59 s	2.66 s	4.37 s	7.68 s	34.0 in (0.86 m)	9 ft 8 in (2.95 m)	16 reps
All values from NFL Combine

The Detroit Lions selected Claiborne in the first round (ninth pick overall) of the 1999 NFL draft, and he played for the Lions from 1999 to 2002. He later played for the Minnesota Vikings from 2003 to 2004, the St. Louis Rams in 2005, and the New York Giants in 2006. He signed with the Jacksonville Jaguars in August 2007 but was released before the start of the 2007 regular season.

Year	Team	Games	Combined tackles	Tackles	Assisted tackles	Sacks	Forced fumbles	Fumble recoveries	Fumble return yards	Interceptions	Interception return yards	Yards per interception return	Longest interception return	Interceptions returned for touchdown	Passes defended
1999	DET	15	66	50	16	1.5	1	3	0	0	0	0	0	0	2
2000	DET	16	101	62	39	0.5	3	0	0	1	1	1	1	0	4
2001	DET	16	119	77	42	4.0	1	1	0	2	11	6	6	0	6
2002	DET	16	100	72	28	4.5	0	1	0	3	63	21	43	1	7
2003	MIN	12	80	61	19	3.0	1	2	0	1	3	3	3	0	7
2004	MIN	12	56	38	18	1.0	1	1	0	1	15	15	15	1	5
2005	STL	14	38	33	5	0.5	1	0	0	0	0	0	0	0	0
2006	NYG	4	2	1	1	0.0	0	0	0	0	0	0	0	0	0
Career		105	562	394	168	15.0	8	8	0	8	93	12	43	2	31

== Coaching ==
In February 2013, Claiborne began coaching at Oaks Christian School in Westlake Village, California. He moved to Calabasas High School in 2014 as defensive coordinator, and took over as head coach in 2018. He resigned in December 2019; in two years as Calabasas' head coach, he went 17–6.

Claiborne returned to USC in 2020 as a quality control analyst; he had received his bachelor's degree from the university in 2019. On January 25, 2021, Claiborne was named linebackers coach at Arizona State.
