= Victor Rogers =

American football player (born 1963)

No. 71
- Position: Offensive tackle

Personal information
- Born: October 10, 1978 (age 48); Seattle, Washington, U.S.
- Listed height: 6 ft 6 in (1.98 m)
- Listed weight: 331 lb (150 kg)

Career information
- High school: Decatur (WA)
- College: Colorado
- NFL draft: 2002: 7th round, 259th overall pick

Career history
- Detroit Lions (2002–2005)
- Stats at Pro Football Reference

Victor Rogers (born October 10, 1978) is an American former professional football player who was an offensive tackle for the Detroit Lions from 2002 until 2005. He played college football for Colorado Buffaloes.

== Professional career ==
Rogers was selected in the seventh round, 259th overall by the Detroit Lions in the 2002 NFL draft. He agreed to terms with the team on July 17 and was expected to be a reserve offensive tackle.

While playing in a preseason game against the Pittsburgh Steelers, Rogers went down with an injured ankle and was placed on injured reserve, ending his rookie season.
