= Big Sky Conference Tournament =

Big Sky Conference Championship or Big Sky Conference Tournament may refer to:

- Big Sky Conference men's basketball tournament, the men's basketball championship tournament
- Big Sky Conference women's basketball tournament, the women's basketball championship
