= Andre' Dixon =

American football player (born 1975)

No. 38
- Position: Cornerback

Personal information
- Born: December 4, 1975 (age 50); Philadelphia, Pennsylvania, U.S.
- Listed height: 6 ft 1 in (1.85 m)
- Listed weight: 200 lb (91 kg)

Career information
- High school: Chestnut Hill Academy (Philadelphia)
- College: Northeastern (1994–1998)
- NFL draft: 1999: undrafted

Career history
- Green Bay Packers (1999)*; Detroit Lions (1999); New England Patriots (2000)*; Green Bay Packers (2001)*
- * Offseason or practice squad member only
- Stats at Pro Football Reference

Andre' Lee Dixon (born December 4, 1975) is an American former professional football cornerback who played for the Detroit Lions of the National Football League (NFL). He played college football for the Northeastern Huskies.

== Early life ==
Andre' Lee Dixon was born on December 4, 1975, in Philadelphia, Pennsylvania. He attended Chestnut Hill Academy in Philadelphia.

== College career ==
Dixon enrolled at Northeastern University to play college football for the Huskies. He redshirted the 1994 season and was a four-year letterman from 1995 to 1998. He was a three-year starter and posted career totals of 171 tackles and six interceptions.

== Professional career ==
After going undrafted in the 1999 NFL draft, Dixon signed with the Green Bay Packers on April 23. He was released on August 5, 1999, during training camp.

Dixon was signed to the practice squad of the Detroit Lions on October 6, 1999. He was promoted to the active roster on November 24, released on November 29, re-signed to the practice squad on November 30, promoted to the active roster again on December 18, and placed on injured reserve on January 4, 2000. He played in four games overall for the Lions during the 1999 season in a reserve role. He was listed as a cornerback during his time with the Lions but mostly played special teams. Dixon was released on August 22, 2000, after the third preseason game.

Dixon was signed to the New England Patriots' practice squad on October 11, 2000. He was released on October 18, 2000.

Dixon signed with the Packers again on June 5, 2001. He was released on July 23, re-signed on August 1, and released again on August 4, 2001.
