= Josh Thornhill =

American football player (born 1980)

No. 84, 57
- Position: Linebacker

Personal information
- Born: January 19, 1980 (age 46); Lansing, Michigan, U.S.
- Listed height: 6 ft 2 in (1.88 m)
- Listed weight: 243 lb (110 kg)

Career information
- High school: Eastern (Lansing)
- College: Michigan State
- NFL draft: 2002: undrafted

Career history
- Detroit Lions (2002)

Awards and highlights
- 2× First-team All-Big Ten (2000, 2001)

Career NFL statistics
- Games played: 7
- Stats at Pro Football Reference

Josh Thornhill (born January 19, 1980) is an American former professional football player who was a linebacker for the Detroit Lions of the National Football League (NFL) in 2002. He played college football for the Michigan State Spartans.

Thornhill was a four-year starter at Michigan State University, where he was awarded the Big Ten Medal of Honor in 2002. After going undrafted in the 2002 NFL draft, Thornhill joined the Detroit Lions in training camp. Thornhill was released on September 1, but rejoined the organization and was placed on the practice squad on September 3. He was signed to an NFL deal and placed on the active roster on September 28. Thornhill appeared in seven games that season.

During the Lions' 2003 mini-camp, Thornhill suffered a stress fracture in his foot that left him unable to play for over a month. He was released on July 23.
