= Johnathan Taylor =

American football player (born 1979)

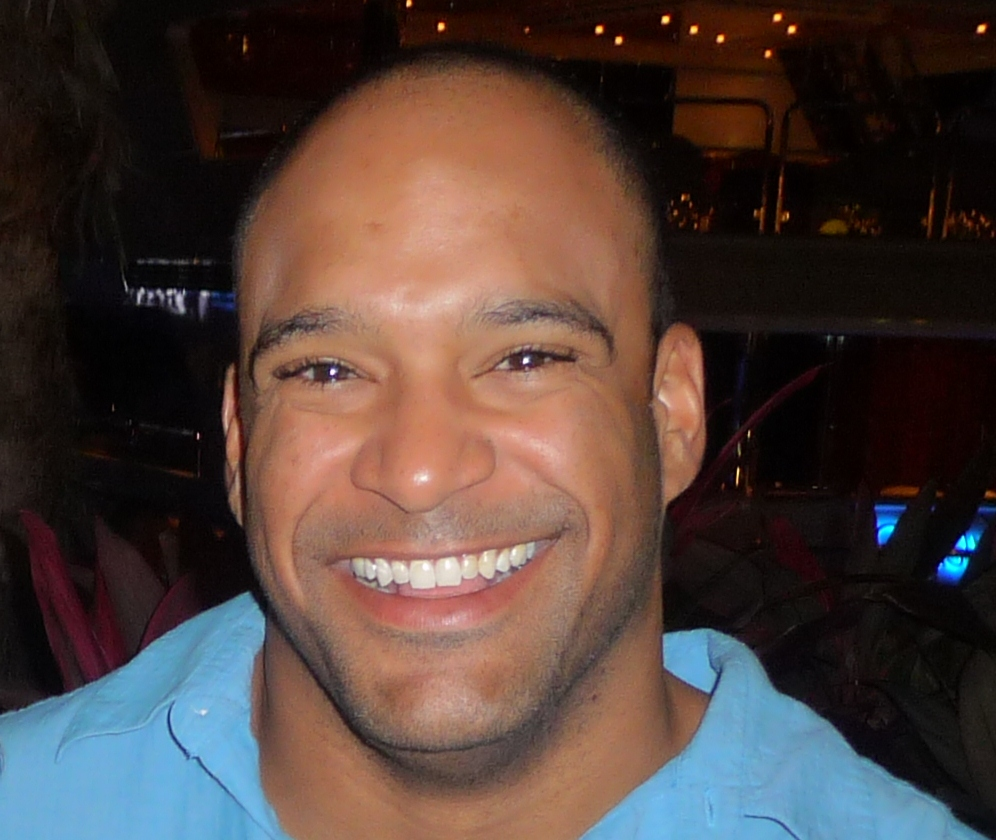
- Taylor in 2009

Profile
- Position: Defensive end

Personal information
- Born: August 29, 1979 (age 47); Denver, Colorado, U.S.
- Listed height: 6 ft 4 in (1.93 m)
- Listed weight: 260 lb (118 kg)

Career information
- College: Montana State University
- NFL draft: 2002: 4th round, 134th overall pick

Career history
- Detroit Lions (2002–2003); Los Angeles Avengers (2004); Dallas Cowboys (2004)*; Chicago Rush (2005); Atlanta Falcons (2005)*
- * Offseason or practice squad member only

Johnathan Ryan Taylor (born August 29, 1979) is an American former professional football defensive end in the National Football League (NFL). He was selected by the Detroit Lions out of Montana State University in the fourth round of the 2002 NFL draft. He also spent time with the NFL's Dallas Cowboys and the Atlanta Falcons, as well as the Los Angeles Avengers, and the Chicago Rush of the Arena Football League (AFL).

Taylor attended Montana State University and was a member of their football team, the Bobcats, graduating in 2002 with a degree in Health and Human Development. Shortly after retiring from professional football in 2005, he began a master's degree program (Higher Education Administration) at MSU, completing the program in 2009. Taylor later joined and became a staff member of the Montana State athletic department. He currently resides in Bozeman and works as a financial advisor with D.A. Davidson Companies.
