= Scotty Anderson =

American football player (born 1979)

No. 88
- Position: Wide receiver

Personal information
- Born: November 24, 1979 (age 46); Jonesboro, Louisiana, U.S.
- Listed height: 6 ft 2 in (1.88 m)
- Listed weight: 191 lb (87 kg)

Career information
- High school: Jonesboro-Hodge (LA)
- College: Grambling State
- NFL draft: 2001: 5th round, 148th overall pick

Career history
- Detroit Lions (2001–2003); Arizona Cardinals (2004)*; Tampa Bay Buccaneers (2005)*; Grand Rapids Rampage (2007)
- * Offseason or practice squad member only

Career NFL statistics
- Receptions: 54
- Receiving yards: 858
- Receiving TDs: 4
- Stats at Pro Football Reference

Scotty Anderson (born November 24, 1979) is an American former professional football player who was a wide receiver in the National Football League (NFL) and the Arena Football League (AFL). He played college football for the Grambling State Tigers.

== Early life ==
Anderson attended Jonesboro-Hodge High School in Louisiana and was a letterman in football.

== College career ==
As a wide receiver for the Grambling Tigers, Anderson had a total of 69 receptions for 1146 yards and 10 touchdowns his senior season. Anderson holds the Grambling State career record with 195 receptions for 3,334 yards and 35 touchdowns. Anderson, A three-year starter, he became the only player in school history to gain over 1,000 yards receiving in a season twice (1999–2000). He was an All-American first-team selection by the Associated Press, The Sports Network, Sports Xchange and Sheridan Broadcasting Network & Black College Sports as a senior.

== Professional career ==
=== Detroit Lions ===
Anderson was drafted 148th overall by the Detroit Lions in the 2001 NFL draft in the fifth round. He then spent 2001-2003 with them. His career totals in 34 games are 54 receptions for 858 yards and 4 touchdowns.

=== Arizona Cardinals ===
Anderson signed a contract with the Arizona Cardinals on August 24, 2004. He was waived by the team on August 26.

=== Tampa Bay Buccaneers ===
On January 5, 2005 he signed a Reserve/Future contract with the Tampa Bay Buccaneers. He was waived by the team on May 4, 2005.

=== AFL ===
He played for the Grand Rapids Rampage in the AFL in the 2007 season.

== NFL career statistics ==
Legend
**Bold**	Career high

Year	Team	Games		Receiving					
Year	Team	GP	GS	Tgt	Rec	Yds	Avg	Lng	TD
2001	DET	9	**4**	34	12	211	17.6	69	1
2002	DET	**16**	**4**	**56**	**25**	322	12.9	34	1
2003	DET	9	0	31	17	**325**	**19.1**	**72**	**2**
		34	8	121	54	858	15.9	72	4

== Family ==
His two brothers played in the NFL. His brother Anthony was a safety with the San Diego Chargers (1987), and Stevie was a wide receiver with the New York Jets (1994) and the Arizona Cardinals (1995–96).

== See also ==
- List of Arena Football League and National Football League players
