= Mark Carrier =

Mark Carrier may refer to:

- Mark Carrier (safety) (born 1968), American football safety, played for Chicago Bears, Detroit Lions and Washington Redskins
- Mark Carrier (wide receiver) (born 1965), American football, played for Tampa Bay Buccaneers, Cleveland Browns and Carolina Panthers
