= Mike Pringley =

American football player (born 1976)

No. 92, 72
- Position: Defensive end

Personal information
- Born: May 22, 1976 (age 50); Linden, New Jersey, U.S.
- Listed height: 6 ft 4 in (1.93 m)
- Listed weight: 277 lb (126 kg)

Career information
- High school: Linden (NJ)
- College: North Carolina
- NFL draft: 1999: 7th round, 215th overall pick

Career history
- Detroit Lions (1999–2000); San Diego Chargers (2000–2001)
- Stats at Pro Football Reference

Mike Pringley (born May 22, 1976) is an American former professional football defensive end. He played for the Detroit Lions in 1999 and for the San Diego Chargers in 2000.
