= Tyree Talton =

American football player (born 1976)

No. 25, 35
- Position: Safety

Personal information
- Born: May 10, 1976 (age 50); Beloit, Wisconsin, U.S.
- Listed height: 5 ft 11 in (1.80 m)
- Listed weight: 201 lb (91 kg)

Career information
- High school: F. J. Turner (Beloit)
- College: Northern Iowa
- NFL draft: 1999: 5th round, 137th overall pick

Career history
- Detroit Lions (1999); Oakland Raiders (1999); Detroit Lions (1999); New York/New Jersey Hitmen (2001)

Career NFL statistics
- Games played: 12
- Games started: 0
- Kick returns: 6
- Return yards: 121
- Stats at Pro Football Reference

Tyree Talton (born May 10, 1976) is an American former professional football player who was a defensive back in the National Football League (NFL) and the XFL. He was selected in the fifth round of the 1999 NFL draft. He played for the NFL's Detroit Lions in 1999. In 2001, he played for the New York/New Jersey Hitmen. He played college football for the Northern Iowa Panthers. He was selected by the Hitmen in the eighth round and 58th overall in the 2001 XFL draft.
