= North Sequoia League =

High school athletic league in California

The Northwest Sequoia League is a high school athletic league that is part of the CIF Central Section. There is a seasonal selection of All League players in the scope of sports administered by the league.

== Members ==
- Chowchilla High School
- Sierra High School
- Kerman High School
- Washington Union High School
- Liberty (Madera Ranchos) High School
- Yosemite High School
