= Jonesboro-Hodge High School =

Coordinates: 32.2471°N 92.7188°W

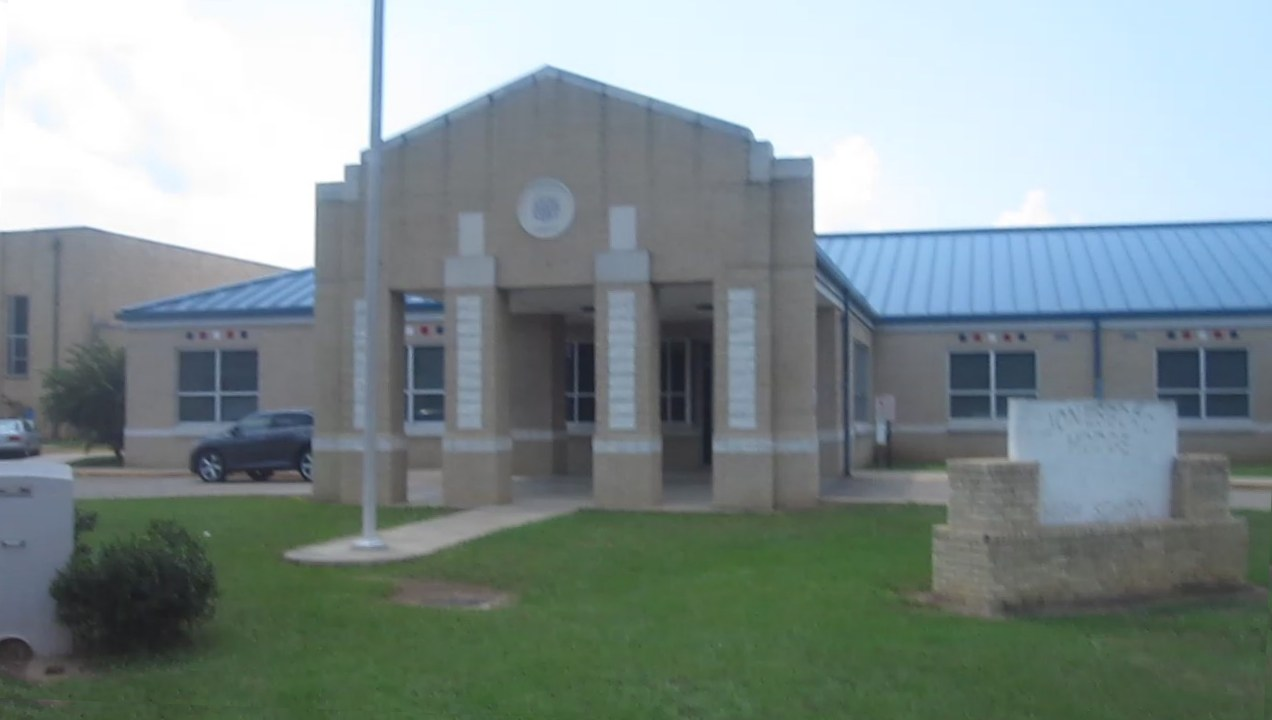
- Jonesboro-Hodge High School in Jonesboro

Location
- 225 Pershing Highway; Jonesboro, Louisiana; United States

Information
- Type: Public School
- Established: 1913
- School district: Jackson Parish School Board
- Principal: Chevonda Leonard
- Teaching staff: 23.40 (FTE)
- Grades: 9–12
- Enrollment: 222 (2023-2024)
- Student to teacher ratio: 9.49
- Colors: Scarlet Red & Royal Blue
- Mascot: Tiger
- Nickname: Tigers
- Website: jhhs.jpsb.us

Jonesboro-Hodge High School is a high school located in Jonesboro in Jackson Parish, Louisiana. The school mascot is the Tiger, named after LSU. The colors are scarlet and royal blue. The school, a part of the Jackson Parish School Board, serves the Town of Jonesboro and the Village of Hodge.

== School uniforms ==
The students are required to wear school uniforms with the choice of jeans and spirit shirts or jeans and regular uniform shirts.

== Athletics ==
Jonesboro-Hodge High is a Class 2A member of the LHSAA and competes in District 2.

Jonesboro-Hodge High School has a wide array of sports, including football, baseball, softball, basketball, track, golf, and dance (Tiger Paw Dance Line).

=== State championships ===
- (5) Football championships: 1930, 1945, 1987, 1988, 1989
- (2) Basketball championships: 1965, 1981

== Notable alumni ==
- Rodney Alexander, Class of 1964, former U.S. Representative
- Scotty Anderson, Class of 1997, former NFL football player
- Xavier Atkins, Attended from 2020-2022, college football player
- Marty Booker, Class of 1994, NFL football player
- John Garlington, Class of 1964, NFL football player
- Randy Moffett, Class of 1965, President of the University of Louisiana System
