= Stephen Trejo =

American football player (born 1977)

No. 36, 34, 33
- Position: Fullback

Personal information
- Born: November 20, 1977 (age 48); Mesa, Arizona, U.S.
- Listed height: 6 ft 2 in (1.88 m)
- Listed weight: 254 lb (115 kg)

Career information
- High school: Casa Grande Union (Casa Grande, Arizona)
- College: Arizona State (1997–2000)
- NFL draft: 2001: undrafted

Career history
- Detroit Lions (2001–2003); St. Louis Rams (2004); Detroit Lions (2004)
- Stats at Pro Football Reference

Stephen Trejo (born November 20, 1977) is an American former professional football player who was a fullback for the Detroit Lions and St. Louis Rams of the National Football League (NFL). He played college football for the Arizona State Sun Devils.

== Early life ==
Trejo attended Casa Grande High School, in Casa Grande, Arizona. He was an all-state selection as a junior and senior, after he had 178 carries for 1,458 yards and 19 touchdowns. On defense, he had 111 tackles, 6.5 sacks, two interceptions and one fumble recovery.

== College career ==
Trejo played college football at Arizona State University. He played linebacker and finished his Sun Devils career with 88 total tackles and three sacks, while playing in 43 games, over four years.

== Professional career ==
Trejo was signed by the Detroit Lions as an undrafted free agent following the 2001 NFL draft. During his rookie season in 2001, he made a career-long reception of 20 yards against the Dallas Cowboys on January 6, 2002. Trejo also completed a career-high of three catches for 26 yards on December 2, 2001. His first career catch came against the Green Bay Packers on November 22, 2001. In 2002, Trejo played in all 16 games, making two catches for 13 yards. Trejo served on special teams with 23 tackles for third on the Lions, 5 of those coming at Arizona, on December 8, 2002. In 2003, Trejo played in all 16 games, mostly on special teams, and saw limited action on offense at the end of the season. He was released on September 5, 2004.

Trejo signed with the St. Louis Rams on September 9, 2004. He played in two games for the Rams before being released on September 21, 2004.

He was signed by the Lions again on September 28, 2004. Trejo made his first career start against Green Bay on October 17, 2004. He became a free agent after the season.

== Personal life ==
Trejo currently lives in North Scottsdale, Arizona.
