= 2000 Green Bay Packers season =

NFL team season

- Owner: Green Bay Packers, Inc.
- General manager: Ron Wolf
- President: Bob Harlan
- Head coach: Mike Sherman
- Home stadium: Lambeau Field

Results
- Record: 9–7
- Division place: 3rd NFC Central
- Playoffs: Did not qualify
- All-Pros: 1: S Darren Sharper (1st team)
- Pro Bowlers: 1: FS Darren Sharper

The 2000 season was the Green Bay Packers' 80th in the National Football League (NFL) and their 82nd overall. It was the first season for which Mike Sherman was the head coach of the team. Sherman was the thirteenth head coach in franchise history. The Packers finished 9–7, failing to qualify for the playoffs. Both the Packers' total offense and total defense ranked 15th in the league.

== Offseason ==
=== Notable transactions ===
- March 31, 2000 – The New Orleans Saints send their 3rd round Pick and K. D. Williams to the Green Bay Packers in exchange for Quarterback Aaron Brooks and Tight End Lamont Hall.

Additions	Subtractions
RB Ahman Green (Seahawks)	DE Vaughn Booker (Bengals)
DT Russell Maryland (Raiders)	LB Anthony Davis (Ravens)
CB Allen Rossum (Eagles)	TE Jeff Thomason (Eagles)
DE John Thierry (Browns)	LB George Koonce (Seahawks)
TE Ryan Wetnight (Bears)	LB Jim Nelson (Bears)
QB Danny Wuerffel (Saints)	WR Desmond Howard (Lions)
LB Nate Wayne (Broncos)	DE Keith McKenzie (Browns)
LB Mike Morton (Rams)	CB Fred Vinson (Seahawks)

=== 2000 NFL draft ===
With their first pick (14th overall) in the 2000 NFL draft, the Packers selected future all-pro tight end Bubba Franks. Later in the draft, they selected future longtime starting offensive tackles Chad Clifton and Mark Tauscher, as well as pro bowl defensive end Kabeer Gbaja-Biamila.

2000 Green Bay Packers draft
Round	Pick	Player	Position	College	Notes
1	14	Bubba Franks *	Tight end	Miami (FL)	
2	44	Chad Clifton *	Offensive tackle	Tennessee	
3	74	Steve Warren	Defensive tackle	Nebraska	
4	98	Na'il Diggs	Linebacker	Ohio State	
4	114	Anthony Lucas	Wide receiver	Arkansas	
4	126	Gary Berry	Safety	Ohio State	
5	149	Kabeer Gbaja-Biamila *	Defensive end	San Diego State	
5	151	Joey Jamison	Wide receiver	Texas Southern	
7	224	Mark Tauscher	Offensive Tackle	Wisconsin	
7	229	Ron Moore	Defensive tackle	Northwestern Oklahoma State	
7	242	Charles Lee	Wide receiver	Central Florida	
7	249	Eugene McCaslin	Linebacker	Florida	
7	252	Rondell Mealey	Running back	LSU	
Made roster * Made at least one Pro Bowl during career

=== Undrafted free agents ===
2000 undrafted free agents of note
Player	Position	College
Bobby Brown	Wide receiver	Notre Dame
Kenny Coutain	Wide receiver	Memphis
Herbert Goodman	Running back	Graceland
Damian Johnson	Safety	Alabama State
Kevin Johnson	Linebacker	Ohio State
Adam Newman	Tight end	Boston College
Bradley Pittman	Cornerback	Southern
David Purnell	Punter	Northwest Missouri State
Travis Williams	Wide receiver	Navy

== Personnel ==
=== Staff ===
2000 Green Bay Packers staff
Front office: President and chief executive officer – Bob Harlan; Senior vice president of administration – John Jones; Executive vice president/general manager – Ron Wolf; Vice president of personnel – Ken Herock; Director of player finance/football operations – Andrew Brandt; Director of college scouting – John Dorsey; Director of pro personnel – Reggie McKenzie; Pro personnel assistant – Vince Workman; Head coaches: Head coach – Mike Sherman; Offensive coaches: Offensive coordinator – Tom Rossley; Running backs – Kippy Brown; Wide receivers – Ray Sherman; Tight ends – Jeff Jagodzinski; Offensive line – Larry Beightol; Assistant offensive line – Rich McGeorge; Offensive assistant/quality control – Darrell Bevell; Offensive assistant/quality control – Trent Miles	Defensive coaches: Defensive coordinator – Ed Donatell; Defensive line – Jethro Franklin; Linebackers – Bo Pelini; Defensive backs – Bob Slowik; Assistant defensive backs – Lionel Washington; Defensive assistant/quality control – Billy Davis; Special teams coaches: Special teams – Frank Novak; Strength and conditioning: Strength and conditioning – Barry Rubin; Strength and conditioning assistant – Mark Lovat

=== Roster ===
2000 Green Bay Packers roster
Quarterbacks (QB): 4 Brett Favre; 11 Matt Hasselbeck; 7 Danny Wuerffel; Running backs (RB): 29 Herbert Goodman; 30 Ahman Green; 33 William Henderson FB; 25 Dorsey Levens; 22 De'Mond Parker; 44 Matt Snider FB; Wide receivers (WR): 80 Donald Driver; 86 Antonio Freeman; 82 Charles Lee; 84 Bill Schroeder; Tight ends (TE): 81 Tyrone Davis; 88 Bubba Franks; 83 Ryan Wetnight	Offensive linemen (OL): 76 Chad Clifton LT; 72 Earl Dotson RT; 58 Mike Flanagan C; 63 Richard Mercier G; 62 Marco Rivera G; 79 Barry Stokes G; 65 Mark Tauscher RT; 78 Ross Verba G; 68 Mike Wahle LT; 52 Frank Winters C; Defensive linemen (DL): 96 David Bowens DE; 94 Kabeer Gbaja-Biamila DE; 90 Vonnie Holliday DE; 97 Cletidus Hunt DE; 98 Billy Lyon DE; 67 Russell Maryland DT; 99 Austin Robbins DT; 91 John Thierry DE	Linebackers (LB): 59 Na'il Diggs OLB; 57 Chris Gizzi MLB; 55 Bernardo Harris MLB; 56 Eugene McCaslin OLB; 53 Mike Morton OLB; 54 Nate Wayne OLB; 50 K. D. Williams OLB; Defensive backs (DB): 31 Chris Akins FS; 36 LeRoy Butler SS; 24 Antuan Edwards FS; 27 Tod McBride CB; 43 Scott McGarrahan SS; 34 Mike McKenzie CB; 20 Allen Rossum CB; 42 Darren Sharper FS; 37 Tyrone Williams CB; Special teams (ST): 9 Josh Bidwell P; 60 Rob Davis LS; 8 Ryan Longwell K	Practice squad: 10 Kenny Coutain WR; 46 Jason Gavadza TE; -- Warner Herndon S; 70 Ed Kehl G; 64 Tom Schau C; Reserve: 21 Gary Berry S (IR); 85 Corey Bradford WR (IR); 61 Scott Curry T (IR); 71 Santana Dotson DT (IR); 87 Anthony Lucas WR (PUP); 32 Rondell Mealey RB (IR); 95 Steve Warren DT (IR); 51 Brian Williams MLB (IR); 16 Travis Williams WR (Military); Rookies in italics 53 active, 10 reserve, 5 practice squad

== Preseason ==
Date	Opponent	Result	Record	Venue	Attendance
August 4	New York Jets	W 37–24	1–0	Lambeau Field	59,585
August 13	at Denver Broncos	L 20–26	1–1	Mile High Stadium	75,367
August 21	at Miami Dolphins	L 14–17	1–2	Pro Player Stadium	60,287
August 26	Cleveland Browns	W 34–33	2–2	Lambeau Field	59,687

== Regular season ==
=== Schedule ===
The Packers finished in third place in the NFC Central division with a 9–7 record, ahead of the Detroit Lions due to a divisional tiebreaker. This is to date the last season the Packers finished above .500 and missed the playoffs.

Week	Date	Opponent	Result	Record	Venue	Attendance
1	September 3	New York Jets	L 16–20	0–1	Lambeau Field	59,870
2	September 10	at Buffalo Bills	L 18–27	0–2	Ralph Wilson Stadium	72,722
3	September 17	Philadelphia Eagles	W 6–3	1–2	Lambeau Field	59,869
4	September 24	at Arizona Cardinals	W 29–3	2–2	Sun Devil Stadium	69,568
5	October 1	Chicago Bears	L 24–27	2–3	Lambeau Field	59,869
6	October 8	at Detroit Lions	L 24–31	2–4	Pontiac Silverdome	77,549
7	October 15	San Francisco 49ers	W 31–28	3–4	Lambeau Field	59,870
8	Bye					
9	October 29	at Miami Dolphins	L 20–28	3–5	Pro Player Stadium	73,740
10	November 6	Minnesota Vikings	W 26–20 (OT)	4–5	Lambeau Field	59,854
11	November 12	at Tampa Bay Buccaneers	L 15–20	4–6	Raymond James Stadium	65,621
12	November 19	Indianapolis Colts	W 26–24	5–6	Lambeau Field	59,869
13	November 27	at Carolina Panthers	L 14–31	5–7	Ericsson Stadium	73,295
14	December 3	at Chicago Bears	W 28–6	6–7	Soldier Field	66,944
15	December 10	Detroit Lions	W 26–13	7–7	Lambeau Field	59,854
16	December 17	at Minnesota Vikings	W 33–28	8–7	Hubert H. Humphrey Metrodome	64,183
17	December 24	Tampa Bay Buccaneers	W 17–14 (OT)	9–7	Lambeau Field	59,692

=== Game summaries ===
==== Week 5: vs. Chicago Bears ====
Week 5: Chicago Bears at Green Bay Packers

Quarter	1	2	3	4	Total
Bears	10	7	7	3	27
Packers	0	3	7	14	24

at Lambeau Field, Green Bay, Wisconsin

- Date: October 1, 2000
- Game time: 3:15 p.m. CST
- Game weather: Overcast, 72 °F (22 °C)
- Game attendance: 59,869
- Referee: Ron Winter
- TV announcers (Fox): Curt Menefee and Brian Baldinger

Game information

First quarter

Second quarter

Third quarter

Fourth quarter

Top passers

- CHI – Cade McNown – 11/20, 203 yards, 2 TD
- GB – Brett Favre – 31/48, 333 yards, 3 TD, 1 int

Top rushers

- CHI – James Allen – 24 rushes, 72 yards
- GB – Dorsey Levens – 11 rushes, 24 yards

Top receivers

- CHI – Marcus Robinson – 2 receptions, 126 yards, 2 TD
- GB – Bill Schroeder – 8 receptions, 108 yards, 2 TD

==== Week 10: vs. Minnesota Vikings ====
Week 10: Minnesota Vikings at Green Bay Packers

Quarter	1	2	3	4	OT	Total
Vikings	3	10	7	0	0	20
Packers	0	10	10	0	6	26

at Lambeau Field, Green Bay, Wisconsin

- Date: November 6, 2000
- Game time: 8:00 p.m. CST
- Game weather: Overcast, 50 °F (10 °C)
- Game attendance: 59,854
- Referee: Dick Hantak
- TV announcers (ABC): Al Michaels, Dan Fouts, Dennis Miller, Melissa Stark and Eric Dickerson
- Recap, Game Book

Game information

First quarter

- MIN – Gary Anderson 30-yard field goal, 8:25. Vikings 3–0. Drive: 10 plays, 53 yards, 5:36.

Second quarter

- GB – Ryan Longwell 24-yard field goal, 14:53. Tied 3–3. Drive: 15 plays, 81 yards, 8:32.
- MIN – Cris Carter 12-yard pass from Daunte Culpepper (Gary Anderson kick), 10:03. Vikings 10–3. Drive: 8 plays, 84 yards, 4:50.
- GB – Ahman Green 5-yard pass from Brett Favre (Ryan Longwell kick), 6:51. Tied 10–10. Drive: 6 plays, 87 yards, 3:12.
- MIN – Gary Anderson 48-yard field goal, 0:00. Vikings 13–10. Drive: 9 plays, 57 yards, 1:11.

Third quarter

- GB – Ryan Longwell 31-yard field goal, 8:48. Tied 13–13. Drive: 6 plays, 21 yards, 2:22.
- MIN – Robert Smith 45-yard pass from Daunte Culpepper (Gary Anderson kick), 4:00. Vikings 20–13. Drive: 8 plays, 73 yards, 4:48.
- GB – Ahman Green 2-yard run (Ryan Longwell kick), 3:32. Tied 20–20. Drive: 2 plays, 2 yards, 0:28.

Fourth quarter

- No scoring plays.

Overtime

- GB – Antonio Freeman 43-yard pass from Brett Favre, 11:21. Packers 26–20. Drive: 7 plays, 82 yards, 3:39.

Top passers

- MIN – Daunte Culpepper – 17/34, 276 yards, 2 TD, 3 int
- GB – Brett Favre – 17/36, 235 yards, 2 TD

Top rushers

- MIN – Robert Smith – 24 rushes, 122 yards
- GB – Ahman Green – 23 rushes, 68 yards, TD

Top receivers

- MIN – Randy Moss – 6 receptions, 130 yards
- GB – Antonio Freeman – 5 receptions, 118 yards, TD

Known for its dramatic walk-off victory by the Packers as Antonio Freeman caught a long pass for a walk-off touchdown. Freeman made the catch after the ball bounced off a defender and then himself, while laying on the ground, before getting up and running into the endzone. Announcer Al Michaels exclaimed during the immediate replay "He did what?", a phrase that is now associated with the game.

==== Week 12: vs Indianapolis Colts ====
Week 12: Green Bay Packers vs Indianapolis Colts

Quarter	1	2	3	4	Total
Colts	0	0	3	21	24
Packers	0	14	0	7	21

at Lambeau Field, Green Bay, Wisconsin

- Date: November 19, 2000
- Game time: 12:00 p.m. CST
- Game weather: Overcast, 27 °F (−3 °C)
- Game attendance: 59,869
- TV announcers (CBS): Ian Eagle and Mark May

Game information

First quarter

Second quarter

Third quarter

Fourth quarter

Top passers

- IND – Peyton Manning – 25/44, 294 yards, 3 TD, INT
- GB – Brett Favre – 23/36, 301 yards, 2 TD, INT

Top rushers

- IND – Edgerrin James – 17 rushes, 71 yards
- GB – Ahman Green – 24 rushes, 153 yards

Top receivers

- IND – E. G. Green – 6 receptions, 81 yards, TD
- GB – Bill Schroeder – 8 receptions, 155 yards

== Standings ==
NFC Central
	W	L	T	PCT	PF	PA	STK
^{(2)} Minnesota Vikings	11	5	0	.688	397	371	L3
^{(5)} Tampa Bay Buccaneers	10	6	0	.625	388	269	L1
Green Bay Packers	9	7	0	.563	353	323	W4
Detroit Lions	9	7	0	.563	307	307	L1
Chicago Bears	5	11	0	.313	216	355	W1

=== Best performances ===
- Brett Favre, Week 5, 333 Passing Yards vs. Chicago
- Brett Favre, Week 12, 301 Passing Yards vs. Indianapolis
- Antonio Freeman, Week 7, 116 receiving yards vs. San Francisco
- Antonio Freeman, Week 10, 118 receiving yards vs. Minnesota
- Ahman Green, Week 12, 153 rushing yards vs. Indianapolis
- Ahman Green, Week 15, 118 rushing yards vs. Detroit
- Ahman Green, Week 16, 161 rushing yards vs. Minnesota
- Bill Schroeder, Week 12, 155 receiving yards vs. Indianapolis
- Bill Schroeder, Week 14, 119 receiving yards vs. Chicago

== Awards and records ==
- Na'il Diggs, PFW/Pro Football Writers of America All-Rookie Team
- Brett Favre, NFC leader, passing attempts (580)
- Ryan Longwell, NFC Special Teams Player of the Week, week 3
- Ryan Longwell, NFC Special Teams Player of the Week, week 16
- Ryan Longwell, NFC leader, field goals made (33)
- Ryan Longwell, NFC leader, field goals attempted (38)
- Allen Rossum, NFC Special Teams Player of the Week, week 12
- Darren Sharper, NFL leader, interceptions (9)
- Darren Sharper, All-NFL Team (selected by Associated Press and Pro Football Weekly)
- Darren Sharper, Associated Press All-Pro selection
- Darren Sharper, Pro Football Writers of America All-Pro selection
