= 1999 Green Bay Packers season =

NFL team season

- Owner: Green Bay Packers, Inc.
- General manager: Ron Wolf
- President: Bob Harlan
- Head coach: Ray Rhodes
- Offensive coordinator: Sherman Lewis
- Defensive coordinator: Emmitt Thomas
- Home stadium: Lambeau Field

Results
- Record: 8–8
- Division place: 4th NFC Central
- Playoffs: Did not qualify
- All-Pros: None
- Pro Bowlers: None

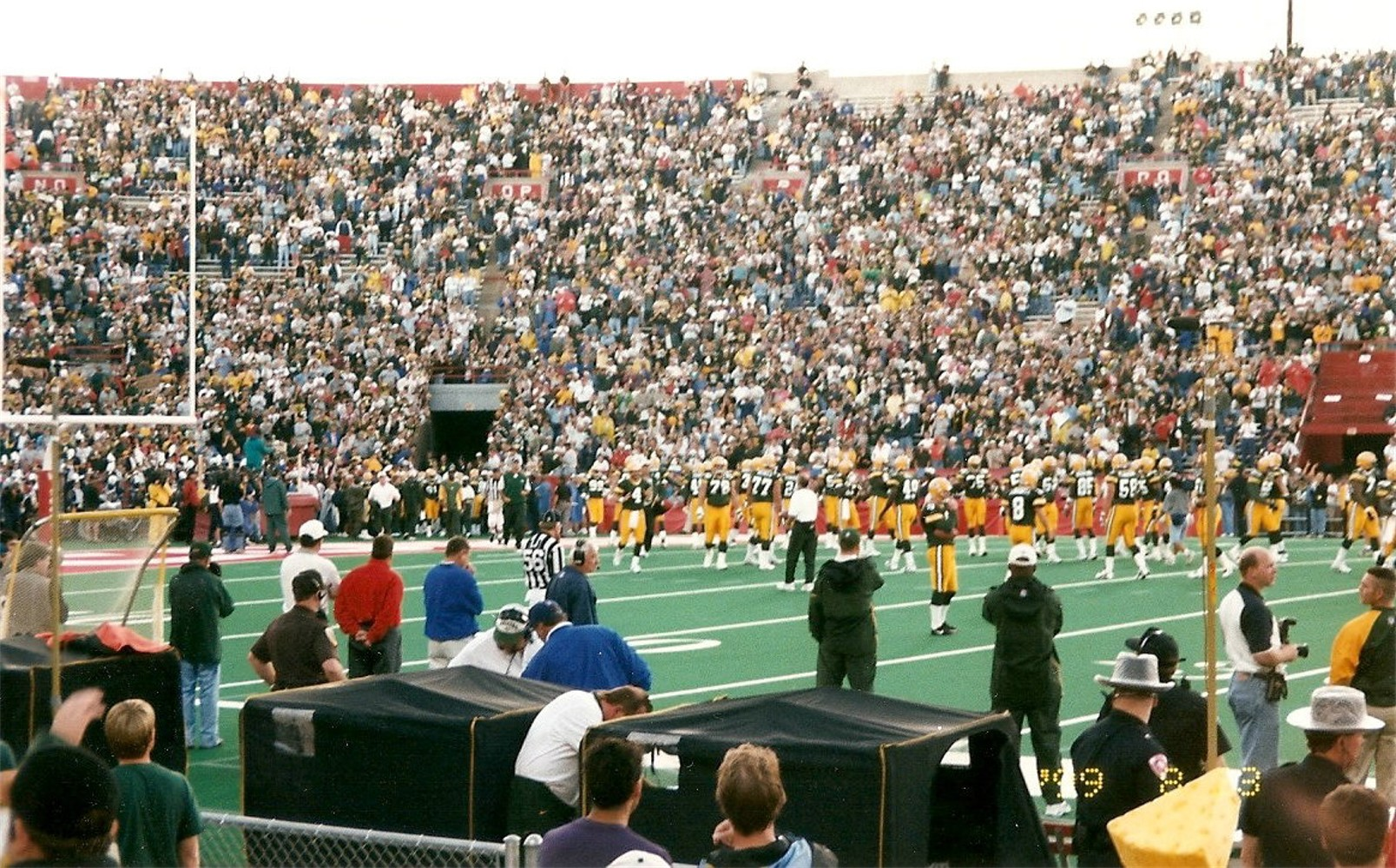
Green Bay hosts the Denver Broncos in preseason at Camp Randall Stadium on August 23, 1999

The 1999 season was the Green Bay Packers' 79th in the National Football League (NFL) and their 81st overall. It was the first and only season for head coach Ray Rhodes and the first time since 1992 Reggie White was not on the roster as he retired after the Packers loss to the 49ers in the playoffs. The Packers finished 8–8, posting their worst record since Brett Favre took over the helm as the Packers' starting quarterback, and also missing the playoffs for the first time since 1992.

== Offseason ==
Additions	Subtractions
LB Anthony Davis (Chiefs)	P Sean Landeta (Eagles)
G Raleigh McKenzie (Chargers)	DT Bob Kuberski (Patriots)
	G Adam Timmerman (Rams)

=== 1999 expansion draft ===
Packers selected during the expansion draft
Pick	Name	Position	Expansion team
25	Michael Blair	Running back	Cleveland Browns

=== 1999 NFL draft ===
In the 1999 NFL draft, the Packers selected free safety Antuan Edwards in the first round (25th overall). Notably, the Packers drafted future Pro Bowl wide receiver Donald Driver in the seventh round (213th overall).

1999 Green Bay Packers draft
Round	Pick	Player	Position	College	Notes
1	25	Antuan Edwards	Safety	Clemson	
2	47	Fred Vinson	Cornerback	Vanderbilt	
3	87	Mike McKenzie	Cornerback	Memphis	
3	94	Cletidus Hunt	Defensive tackle	Kentucky State	
4	131	Aaron Brooks	Quarterback	Virginia	
4	133	Josh Bidwell *	Punter	Oregon	
5	159	De'Mond Parker	Running back	Oklahoma	
5	163	Craig Heimburger	Guard	Missouri	
6	196	Dee Miller	Wide receiver	Ohio State	
6	203	Scott Curry	Offensive tackle	Montana	
7	212	Chris Akins	Safety	Arkansas–Pine Bluff	
7	213	Donald Driver *	Wide receiver	Alcorn State	
Made roster * Made at least one Pro Bowl during career

=== Undrafted free agents ===
1999 undrafted free agents of note
Player	Position	College
Jeremy Beutler	Linebacker	Ohio
Howard Burns	Defensive tackle	Lane
Alphonso Collins	Tight end	East Carolina
Zola Davis	Wide receiver	South Carolina
Andre' Dixon	Cornerback	Northeastern
Grant Garrett	Center	Arkansas
Deon Humphrey	Linebacker	Florida State
Tod McBride	Cornerback	UCLA
Kevin McCullar	Linebacker	Texas Tech
Basil Mitchell	Running back	TCU
Mike Newell	Center	Colorado State
Michael Vaughn	Wide receiver	Alabama

== Personnel ==
=== Staff ===
1999 Green Bay Packers staff
Front office: President and chief executive officer – Bob Harlan; Senior vice president of administration – John Jones; Executive vice president and general manager – Ron Wolf; Vice president of personnel – Ken Herock; Director of player personnel – Ted Thompson; Director of player finance/football operations – Andrew Brandt; Director of pro personnel – Reggie McKenzie; Pro personnel assistant – Vince Workman; Head coaches: Head coach – Ray Rhodes; Offensive coaches: Offensive coordinator – Sherman Lewis; Quarterbacks – Mike McCarthy; Running backs – Harry Sydney; Wide receivers – Charlie Baggett; Tight ends – Jeff Jagodzinski; Offensive line – Larry Beightol; Assistant offensive line – Irv Eatman; Offensive assistant/quality control – Ken Zampese	Defensive coaches: Defensive coordinator – Emmitt Thomas; Defensive line – Mike Trgovac; Linebackers – Johnny Holland; Defensive backs – Joe Vitt; Assistant defensive backs – Lionel Washington; Defensive assistant/quality control – Chuck Knox Jr.; Special teams coaches: Special teams – Steve Ortmayer; Strength and conditioning: Strength and conditioning – Barry Rubin; Strength and conditioning assistant – Mark Lovat

=== Roster ===
1999 Green Bay Packers roster
Quarterbacks (QB): 2 Aaron Brooks; 4 Brett Favre; 11 Matt Hasselbeck; Running backs (RB): 33 William Henderson FB; 25 Dorsey Levens; 28 Basil Mitchell; 29 Rashaan Salaam; 38 Matt Snider FB; Wide receivers (WR): 85 Corey Bradford; 80 Donald Driver; 86 Antonio Freeman; 20 Tyrone Goodson; 82 Charles Jordan; 84 Bill Schroeder; Tight ends (TE): 81 Tyrone Davis; 49 Lamont Hall; 83 Jeff Thomason	Offensive linemen (OL): 61 Scott Curry RT; 72 Earl Dotson RT; 58 Mike Flanagan C; 75 Craig Heimburger G; 63 Raleigh McKenzie G; 64 Mike Newell C; 62 Marco Rivera G; 78 Ross Verba LT; 68 Mike Wahle G; 52 Frank Winters C; Defensive linemen (DL): 94 Roy Barker DE; 96 Vaughn Booker DE; 93 Gilbert Brown DT; 71 Santana Dotson DT; 90 Vonnie Holliday DE; 97 Cletidus Hunt DE; 98 Billy Lyon DT; 95 Keith McKenzie DE; 99 Jermaine Smith DT	Linebackers (LB): 55 Bernardo Harris OLB; 53 George Koonce MLB; 56 Kivuusama Mays OLB; 57 Jim Nelson MLB; 54 Jude Waddy OLB; Defensive backs (DB): 47 Tyrone Bell CB; 36 LeRoy Butler SS; 24 Antuan Edwards FS; 27 Tod McBride CB; 34 Mike McKenzie CB; 42 Darren Sharper FS; 31 Fred Vinson CB; 23 Jamel Williams SS; 37 Tyrone Williams CB; Special teams (ST): 10 Louie Aguiar P; 60 Rob Davis LS; 8 Ryan Longwell K	Practice squad: -- Carl Hansen DE; -- Lawrence Hart TE; -- Steve Johnson CB; -- Doug Karczewski G; Reserve: 70 Joe Andruzzi G (IR); 88 Jahine Arnold WR (IR); 46 Rodney Artmore S (IR); 9 Josh Bidwell P (NF-Inj.); 89 Mark Chmura TE (IR); 50 Anthony Davis LB (IR); 41 Chris McCoy RB (Military Reserve); 43 Scott McGarrahan S (IR); 22 De'Mond Parker RB (IR); 51 Brian Williams OLB (IR); Rookies in italics 53 active, 10 reserve, 4 practice squad

== Preseason ==
Date	Opponent	Result	Record	Venue	Attendance
August 14	New York Jets	W 27–16	1–0	Lambeau Field	59,815
August 23	vs Denver Broncos	W 27–12	2–0	Camp Randall Stadium	78,184
August 28	at New Orleans Saints	W 38–17	3–0	Louisiana Superdome	53,074
September 2	Miami Dolphins	W 25–17	4–0	Lambeau Field	59,810

== Regular season ==
The Packers finished in fourth place in the NFC Central division with an 8–8 record, behind the 8–8 Detroit Lions due to a conference record tiebreaker.

=== Schedule ===
Week	Date	Opponent	Result	Record	Venue	Attendance
1	September 12	Oakland Raiders	**W** 28–24	1–0	Lambeau Field	59,872
2	September 19	at **Detroit Lions**	**L** 15–23	1–1	Pontiac Silverdome	76,202
3	September 26	**Minnesota Vikings**	**W** 23–20	2–1	Lambeau Field	59,868
4	Bye					
5	October 10	**Tampa Bay Buccaneers**	**W** 26–23	3–1	Lambeau Field	59,868
6	October 17	at Denver Broncos	**L** 10–31	3–2	Mile High Stadium	73,352
7	October 24	at San Diego Chargers	**W** 31–3	4–2	Qualcomm Stadium	68,274
8	November 1	Seattle Seahawks	**L** 7–27	4–3	Lambeau Field	59,869
9	November 7	**Chicago Bears**	**L** 13–14	4–4	Lambeau Field	59,867
10	November 14	at Dallas Cowboys	**L** 13–27	4–5	Texas Stadium	64,634
11	November 21	**Detroit Lions**	**W** 26–17	5–5	Lambeau Field	59,869
12	November 29	at San Francisco 49ers	**W** 20–3	6–5	3Com Park	68,304
13	December 5	at **Chicago Bears**	**W** 35–19	7–5	Soldier Field	66,944
14	December 12	Carolina Panthers	**L** 31–33	7–6	Lambeau Field	59,869
15	December 20	at **Minnesota Vikings**	**L** 20–24	7–7	Hubert H. Humphrey Metrodome	64,203
16	December 26	at **Tampa Bay Buccaneers**	**L** 10–29	7–8	Raymond James Stadium	65,273
17	January 2, 2000	Arizona Cardinals	**W** 49–24	8–8	Lambeau Field	59,818

Note: Intra-division opponents are in bold text.

=== Game summaries ===
==== Week 1 ====
Team	1	2	3	4	Total
Raiders	3	7	7	7	24
• Packers	7	0	7	14	28

- Date: September 12
- Location: Lambeau Field, Green Bay, Wisconsin
- Game start: 12:00 p.m.
- Game weather: 61 °F (16 °C), wind 9 mph (14 km/h)
- Referee: Tony Corrente
- TV announcers (CBS): Verne Lundquist, Dan Dierdorf and Bonnie Bernstein

Scoring summary
1	GB	Bill Schroeder 4 yard pass from Brett Favre (Ryan Longwell kick)	Packers 7–0
1	OAK	Michael Husted 41 yard field goal	Packers 7–3
2	OAK	Randy Jordan 1 yard run (Michael Husted kick)	Raiders 10–7
3	GB	Antonio Freeman 12 yard pass from Brett Favre (Ryan Longwell kick)	Packers 14–10
3	OAK	Tyrone Wheatley 5 yard run (Michael Husted kick)	Raiders 17–14
4	OAK	Randy Jordan 1 yard run (Michael Husted kick)	Raiders 24–14
4	GB	Corey Bradford 8 yard pass from Brett Favre (Ryan Longwell kick)	Raiders 24–21
4	GB	Jeff Thomason 1 yard pass from Brett Favre (Ryan Longwell kick)	Packers 28–24

==== Week 3: vs. Minnesota Vikings ====
Week 3: Minnesota Vikings at Green Bay Packers

Quarter	1	2	3	4	Total
Vikings	7	3	3	7	**20**
**Packers**	0	10	3	10	**23**

at Lambeau Field, Green Bay, Wisconsin

- Date: September 26
- Game time: 3:15 p.m. CDT
- Game weather: Cloudy, 82 °F (28 °C)
- Game attendance: 59,868
- Referee: Johnny Grier (23)
- TV announcers (Fox): Pat Summerall and John Madden
- Recap, Game Book

Game information

**First quarter**

- MIN – Leroy Hoard 2-yard run (Gary Anderson kick), 4:26. Vikings 7–0. **Drive: 14 plays, 94 yards, 7:37.**

**Second quarter**

- GB – Ryan Longwell 28-yard field goal, 14:07. Vikings 7–3. **Drive: 11 plays, 70 yards, 5:19.**
- GB – Antuan Edwards 26-yard interception return (Ryan Longwell kick), 7:37. Packers 10–7.
- MIN – Gary Anderson 34-yard field goal, 0:50. Tied 10–10. **Drive: 15 plays, 63 yards, 6:47.**

**Third quarter**

- MIN – Gary Anderson 22-yard field goal, 9:17. Vikings 13–10. **Drive: 13 plays, 61 yards, 5:43.**
- GB – Ryan Longwell 35-yard field goal, 3:05. Tied 13–13. **Drive: 14 plays, 66 yards, 6:12.**

**Fourth quarter**

- GB – Ryan Longwell 34-yard field goal, 4:25. Packers 16–13. **Drive: 13 plays, 64 yards, 5:47.**
- MIN – Randy Moss 10-yard pass from Randall Cunningham (Gary Anderson kick), 1:56. Vikings 20–16. **Drive: 5 plays, 80 yards, 2:29.**
- GB – Corey Bradford 23-yard pass from Brett Favre (Ryan Longwell kick), 0:12. Packers 23–20. **Drive: 7 plays, 77 yards, 1:44.**

**Top passers**

- MIN – Randall Cunningham – 18/32, 244 yards, TD, 2 INT
- GB – Brett Favre – 24/39, 304 yards, TD

**Top rushers**

- MIN – Robert Smith – 21 rushes, 85 yards
- GB – Dorsey Levens – 18 rushes, 49 yards

**Top receivers**

- MIN – Jake Reed – 6 receptions, 108 yards
- GB – Bill Schroeder – 5 receptions, 85 yards

==== Week 8: vs. Seattle Seahawks ====
Week 8: Seattle Seahawks at Green Bay Packers – Game summary

Quarter	1	2	3	4	Total
**Seahawks**	7	7	7	6	**27**
Packers	0	7	0	0	**7**

at Lambeau Field, Green Bay, Wisconsin

- Date: November 1
- Game time: 8:07pm CST
- Game weather: Clear, 40 °F (4 °C)
- Game attendance: 59,869
- Referee: Ron Blum (17)
- TV announcers (ABC): Al Michaels, Boomer Esiason and Lesley Visser
- Recap, Gamebook

Game information

**First quarter**

- SEA – Shawn Springs 61-yard return of blocked field goal (Todd Peterson kick), 4:45. Seahawks 7–0.

**Second quarter**

- GB – Corey Bradford 74-yard pass from Brett Favre (Ryan Longwell kick), 10:17. Tied 7–7. **Drive: 4 plays, 85 yards, 2:05.**
- SEA – Derrick Mayes 10-yard pass from Jon Kitna (Todd Peterson kick), 5:48. Seahawks 14–7. **Drive: 6 plays, 52 yards, 2:40.**

**Third quarter**

- SEA – Sean Dawkins 2-yard pass from Jon Kitna (Todd Peterson kick), 10:30. Seahawks 21–7. **Drive: 9 plays, 73 yards, 4:30.**

**Fourth quarter**

- SEA – Todd Peterson 19-yard field goal, 9:11. Seahawks 24–7. **Drive: 7 plays, 15 yards, 2:07.**
- SEA – Todd Peterson 29-yard field goal, 6:36. Seahawks 27–7. **Drive: 4 plays, 4 yards, 3:35.**

**Top passers**

- SEA – Jon Kitna – 12/19, 109 yards, 2 TD
- GB – Brett Favre – 14/35, 180 yards, TD, 4 INT

**Top rushers**

- SEA – Ricky Watters – 31 rushes, 125 yards
- GB – Dorsey Levens – 24 rushes, 104 yards

**Top receivers**

- SEA – Derrick Mayes – 4 receptions, 36 yards, TD
- GB – Corey Bradford – 3 receptions, 106 yards, TD

==== Week 9: vs. Chicago Bears ====
Week 9: Chicago Bears at Green Bay Packers

Quarter	1	2	3	4	Total
**Bears**	7	0	7	0	**14**
Packers	3	7	0	3	**13**

at Lambeau Field, Green Bay, Wisconsin

- Date: November 7, 1999
- Game time: 3:03 p.m. CST
- Game weather: Overcast, 51 °F (11 °C)
- Game attendance: 59,867
- Referee: Mike Carey
- TV announcers (Fox): Pat Summerall and John Madden

Game information

**First quarter**

**Second quarter**

**Third quarter**

**Fourth quarter**

**Top passers**

- CHI – Jim Miller – 16/29, 142 yards, 1 TD, 3 int
- GB – Brett Favre – 27/40, 267 yards, 1 TD, 1 int

**Top rushers**

- CHI – Curtis Enis – 20 rushes, 88 yards
- GB – Dorsey Levens – 26 rushes, 79 yards

**Top receivers**

- CHI – Marcus Robinson – 4 receptions, 66 yards
- GB – Bill Schroeder – 4 receptions, 57 yards

== Standings ==
NFC Central
	W	L	T	PCT	PF	PA	STK
^{(2)} Tampa Bay Buccaneers	11	5	0	.688	270	235	W2
^{(4)} Minnesota Vikings	10	6	0	.625	399	335	W3
^{(6)} Detroit Lions	8	8	0	.500	322	323	L4
Green Bay Packers	8	8	0	.500	357	341	W1
Chicago Bears	6	10	0	.375	272	341	L2

== Awards and records ==
- Brett Favre, NFC leader, pass attempts (595)

=== Milestones ===
- Brett Favre, third 4,000-yard passing season (finished season with 4,091)
