= 2002 Green Bay Packers season =

NFL team season

- Head coach: Mike Sherman
- Home stadium: Lambeau Field

Results
- Record: 12–4
- Division place: 1st NFC North
- Playoffs: Lost Wild Card Playoffs (vs. Falcons) 7–27
- All-Pros: 2: QB Brett Favre (2nd team); S Darren Sharper (2nd team)
- Pro Bowlers: 6: QB Brett Favre; RB Ahman Green; WR Donald Driver; TE Bubba Franks; G Marco Rivera; FS Darren Sharper

Uniform

The 2002 season was the Green Bay Packers' 82nd in the National Football League (NFL) and their 84th overall.

For the first time since 1989, LeRoy Butler was not on the opening day roster. This would be the last time until 2025 the Packers drafted a wide receiver in the first round of the NFL Draft.

This was the first of three consecutive NFC North titles for the Packers. They achieved a 12–4 record in the regular season, before losing in the NFC Wild Card playoffs round to quarterback Brett Favre's former team, the Atlanta Falcons, at Lambeau Field. This marked the first time in franchise history that the Packers had lost at home in the playoffs. They have done so six more times since: in 2004, 2007, 2011, 2013, 2020, and 2021.

After the season, Jeff Blackshear decided he had played his final NFL game.

== Background ==
In 2001, the Packers achieved the franchise's best record since 1997, finishing 12–4 and advancing to the divisional round of the playoffs. There, they lost to the eventual NFC champion St. Louis Rams. During the game, it became clear that the Packers would need wide receivers with greater speed and ability to compete with the conference's best teams. GM Mike Sherman spent the 2002 offseason revamping Green Bay's receiving corps. The team promoted Donald Driver to starter, acquired veteran Terry Glenn from the New England Patriots and drafted Javon Walker in the first round of the 2002 NFL draft. The influx of new players seemed to position the Packers as one of the strongest contenders in the NFC.

== Season summary ==
Green Bay started the season with eight wins in their first nine games, led by quarterback Brett Favre and running back Ahman Green. The Packers led the NFC North throughout the year, winning the division by a six-game margin. Green Bay became the first team to win the newly rechristened division, formerly known as the NFC Central. It was the Packers' first division title since 1997, and the team would go on to win the NFC North for three consecutive seasons.

For the first time in years, it appeared that the Packers had a legitimate chance of reaching the Super Bowl heading into the final Sunday of the regular season. With one game left, Green Bay was 12–3, and a victory away from clinching home field advantage throughout the playoffs after the Philadelphia Eagles failed to clinch home field advantage themselves one day prior in an overtime defeat to the New York Giants. The Packers had never lost a home playoff game in franchise history, had achieved an 8–0 record at home in 2002, and had established a run of Lambeau Field dominance since the Mike Holmgren era. As a result, playing home games at Lambeau Field would seemingly give the Packers a significant advantage in the playoffs. The final game was on the road against the New York Jets, who beat the Packers handily to win the AFC East division title. The loss which coincided with the Buccaneers winning was a blow to the Packers, who dropped down to the number three seed in the NFC and had an incredibly difficult road to the Super Bowl. Six days later, the Packers were beaten by Michael Vick's Atlanta Falcons, the first home playoff loss in Packers history.

The 2002 season was another memorable year for quarterback Brett Favre. Throughout the season, Favre was a favorite to win his fourth Most Valuable Player award. The Packers' lopsided loss to the Jets in the regular season finale may have swayed voters, as Favre lost the MVP award by merely two votes to Raiders quarterback Rich Gannon.

== Offseason ==
Additions	Subtractions
WR Terry Glenn (Patriots)	WR Bill Schroeder (Lions)
LB Hardy Nickerson (Jaguars)	DT Santana Dotson (Redskins)
DE Joe Johnson (Saints)	RB Dorsey Levens (Eagles)
WR Karsten Bailey (Seahawks)	WR Antonio Freeman (Eagles)
CB Darrien Gordon (Falcons)	LB Bernardo Harris (Ravens)
RB Ki-Jana Carter (Redskins)	OT Barry Stokes (Browns)
	S LeRoy Butler (retirement)
	DE John Thierry (Falcons)
	WR Corey Bradford (Texans)
	CB Allen Rossum (Falcons)
	S Billy Jenkins (Bills)

=== Draft ===
In the 2002 NFL draft, the Packers selected 20th overall, drafting future all-pro wide receiver Javon Walker with their first round pick.

2002 Green Bay Packers draft
Round	Pick	Player	Position	College	Notes
1	25	Javon Walker *	Wide receiver	Florida State	
3	92	Marques Anderson	Safety	UCLA	
4	135	Najeh Davenport	Running back	Miami (FL)	
5	156	Aaron Kampman *	Defensive end	Iowa	
5	164	Craig Nall	Quarterback	Northwestern State	
6	200	Mike Houghton	Offensive tackle	San Diego State	
Made roster * Made at least one Pro Bowl during career

=== Undrafted free agents ===
2002 undrafted free agents of note
Player	Position	College
Algie Atkinson	Linebacker	Kansas
Kevin Barry	Offensive Tackle	Arizona
Rob Bironas	Kicker	Georgia Southern
Marcus Brady	Quarterback	Cal State Northridge
Andy Eby	Center	Kansas State
Scott Elder	Punter	Oklahoma State
Tony Fisher	Running back	Notre Dame
John Gilmore	Defensive end	Tennessee State
Adrian Hollingshed	Linebacker	Georgia
Ken Kocher	Defensive Tackle	UCLA
Richard Lewis	Wide receiver	North Dakota State
Seneca McMillan	Cornerback	Nicholls State
Bill Seymour	Tight end	Michigan
Erwin Swiney	Cornerback	Nebraska
Jeremy Unertl	Safety	UW–La Crosse
Marcus Wilkins	Linebacker	Texas

== Personnel ==
=== Staff ===
2002 Green Bay Packers staff
Front office: President and chief executive officer – Bob Harlan; Executive vice president and chief operating officer – John Jones; Vice president of player finance/general counsel – Andrew Brandt; Vice president of football operations – Mark Hatley; Director of college scouting – John Dorsey; Director of pro personnel – Reggie McKenzie; Personnel analyst to general manager – John Schneider; Assistant director of college scouting – Shaun Herock; Assistant director of pro personnel – Sean Howard; Head coaches: Executive vice president/general manager/head coach – Mike Sherman; Assistant head coach/defensive backs – Bob Slowik; Offensive coaches: Offensive coordinator – Tom Rossley; Running backs – Sylvester Croom; Wide receivers – Ray Sherman; Tight ends – Jeff Jagodzinski; Offensive line – Larry Beightol; Assistant offensive line – Pat Ruel; Offensive assistant – Darrell Bevell	Defensive coaches: Defensive coordinator – Ed Donatell; Defensive line – Jethro Franklin; Linebackers – Bo Pelini; Assistant defensive backs – Lionel Washington; Defensive assistant/quality control – Brad Miller; Special teams coaches: Special teams – Frank Novak; Quality control assistant/special teams-offense – Stan Drayton; Strength and conditioning: Strength and conditioning – Barry Rubin; Strength and conditioning assistant – Mark Lovat; Weight room assistant – Vince Workman

=== Roster ===
2002 Green Bay Packers roster
Quarterbacks (QB): 4 Brett Favre; 12 Craig Nall; 18 Doug Pederson; Running backs (RB): 39 Tony Carter; 40 Tony Fisher; 30 Ahman Green; 33 William Henderson FB; 22 Eric Metcalf; Wide receivers (WR): 85 Karsten Bailey; 80 Donald Driver; 89 Robert Ferguson; 83 Terry Glenn; 84 Javon Walker; Tight ends (TE): 81 Tyrone Davis; 88 Bubba Franks; 87 David Martin	Offensive linemen (OL): 71 Kevin Barry LT; 69 Jeff Blackshear G; 72 Earl Dotson RT; 63 Bill Ferrario G; 58 Mike Flanagan C; 62 Marco Rivera RG; 68 Mike Wahle LG; 52 Frank Winters C; 77 Jerry Wisne LT; Defensive linemen (DL): 93 Gilbert Brown DT; 94 Kabeer Gbaja-Biamila DE; 90 Vonnie Holliday DE; 97 Cletidus Hunt DT; 74 Aaron Kampman DE; 98 Billy Lyon DT; 73 Keith McKenzie DE; 99 Jamal Reynolds DE; 95 Rod Walker DT; 96 Steve Warren DT	Linebackers (LB): 59 Na'il Diggs OLB; 53 Paris Lenon OLB; 51 Torrance Marshall MLB; 56 Hardy Nickerson MLB; 54 Nate Wayne OLB; 55 Marcus Wilkins OLB; Defensive backs (DB): 20 Marques Anderson FS; 28 Matt Bowen SS; 24 Antuan Edwards SS; 27 Tod McBride CB; 34 Mike McKenzie CB; 42 Darren Sharper FS; 26 Erwin Swiney CB; 32 Bryant Westbrook CB; 37 Tyrone Williams CB; Special teams (ST): 9 Josh Bidwell P; 60 Rob Davis LS; 8 Ryan Longwell K	Practice squad: 61 John Gilmore DE (IR); 79 Jay Humphrey RT; 82 Devin Lewis WR; 78 Terdell Sands DT; 43 Reggie White RB; 16 Greg Zolman QB; Reserve: 76 Chad Clifton LT (IR); 44 Najeh Davenport RB (IR); 91 Joe Johnson DE (IR); 21 Bhawoh Jue S (IR); 65 Mark Tauscher RT (IR); Rookies in italics 53 active, 6 reserve, 5 practice squad

== Preseason ==
Date	Opponent	Result	Record	Venue	Attendance
August 10, 2002	at Philadelphia Eagles	L 13–20	0–1	Veterans Stadium	58,546
August 17, 2002	at Arizona Cardinals	W 29–21	1–1	Sun Devil Stadium	35,716
August 26, 2002	Cleveland Browns	W 27–20	2–1	Lambeau Field	62,668
August 30, 2002	Tennessee Titans	W 21–20	3–1	Lambeau Field	62,485

== Regular season ==
=== Schedule ===
The Packers finished 12–4 overall, winning the NFC North crown by a six-game margin.

Week	Date	Opponent	Result	Record	Venue	Attendance
1	September 8	Atlanta Falcons	W 37–34 (OT)	1–0	Lambeau Field	63,127
2	September 15	at New Orleans Saints	L 20–35	1–1	Louisiana Superdome	67,958
3	September 22	at Detroit Lions	W 37–31	2–1	Ford Field	61,505
4	September 29	Carolina Panthers	W 17–14	3–1	Lambeau Field	63,329
5	October 7	at Chicago Bears	W 34–21	4–1	Memorial Stadium	63,226
6	October 13	at New England Patriots	W 28–10	5–1	Gillette Stadium	68,436
7	October 20	Washington Redskins	W 30–9	6–1	Lambeau Field	63,363
8	Bye					
9	November 4	Miami Dolphins	W 24–10	7–1	Lambeau Field	63,284
10	November 10	Detroit Lions	W 40–14	8–1	Lambeau Field	63,313
11	November 17	at Minnesota Vikings	L 21–31	8–2	Hubert H. Humphrey Metrodome	64,153
12	November 24	at Tampa Bay Buccaneers	L 7–21	8–3	Raymond James Stadium	65,672
13	December 1	Chicago Bears	W 30–20	9–3	Lambeau Field	64,196
14	December 8	Minnesota Vikings	W 26–22	10–3	Lambeau Field	64,070
15	December 15	at San Francisco 49ers	W 20–14	11–3	3Com Park	67,947
16	December 22	Buffalo Bills	W 10–0	12–3	Lambeau Field	64,106
17	December 29	at New York Jets	L 17–42	12–4	Giants Stadium	78,733

=== Game summaries ===
==== Week 1: vs. Atlanta Falcons ====
Week 1: Atlanta Falcons at Green Bay Packers

Quarter	1	2	3	4	OT	Total
Falcons	0	21	3	10	0	34
Packers	3	10	14	7	3	37

at Lambeau Field, Green Bay, Wisconsin

- Date: September 8, 2002
- Game time: 1:00 p.m.
- Game weather: Sunny, 83 °F (28 °C)
- Game attendance: 63,127
- Referee: Ron Winter (14)
- TV announcers (Fox): Curt Menefee, Tim Ryan, Drew Smith
- Recap, Game Book

Game information

First quarter

- GB – Ryan Longwell 28-yard field goal, 4:08. Packers 3–0. Drive: 15 plays, 77 yards, 8:45.

Second quarter

- ATL – Michael Vick 2-yard run (Jay Feely kick), 11:26. Falcons 7–3. Drive: 12 plays, 79 yards, 7:42.
- ATL – Warrick Dunn 3-yard run (Jay Feely kick), 8:43. Falcons 14–3. Drive: 4 plays, 28 yards, 2:31.
- GB – David Martin 3-yard pass from Brett Favre (Ryan Longwell kick), 5:54. Falcons 14–10. Drive: 6 plays, 80 yards, 2:49.
- ATL – Alge Crumpler 2-yard pass from Michael Vick (Jay Feely kick), 1:15. Falcons 21–10. Drive: 5 plays, 68 yards, 3:01.
- GB – Ryan Longwell 42-yard field goal, 0:00. Falcons 21–13. Drive: 9 plays, 56 yards, 1:15.

Third quarter

- GB – Rondell Mealey 2-yard run (Ryan Longwell kick), 12:48. Falcons 21–20. Drive: 4 plays, 59 yards, 2:12.
- ATL – Jay Feely 21-yard field goal, 5:24. Falcons 24–20. Drive: 15 plays, 76 yards, 7:24.
- GB – Javon Walker 13-yard pass from Brett Favre (Ryan Longwell kick), 0:30. Packers 27–24. Drive: 7 plays, 67 yards, 4:54.

Fourth quarter

- ATL – Warrick Dunn 2-yard run (Jay Feely kick), 8:07. Falcons 31–27. Drive: 6 plays, 45 yards, 3:36.
- GB – William Henderson 1-yard run (Ryan Longwell kick), 1:10. Packers 34–31. Drive: 14 plays, 80 yards, 6:57.
- ATL – Jay Feely 52-yard field goal, 0:05. Tied 34–34. Drive: 6 plays, 35 yards, 1:05.

Overtime

- GB – Ryan Longwell 34-yard field goal, 5:15. Packers 37–34. Drive: 7 plays, 44 yards, 4:15.

Top passers

- ATL – Michael Vick – 15/23, 209 yards, TD
- GB – Brett Favre – 25/36, 284 yards, 2 TD

Top rushers

- ATL – Michael Vick – 9 rushes, 72 yards, TD
- GB – Ahman Green – 27 rushes, 155 yards

Top receivers

- ATL – Willie Jackson – 4 receptions, 73 yards
- GB – Donald Driver – 7 receptions, 78 yards

==== Week 2: at New Orleans Saints ====
Week 2: Green Bay Packers at New Orleans Saints

Quarter	1	2	3	4	Total
Packers	0	10	7	3	20
Saints	7	14	7	7	35

at Louisiana Superdome, New Orleans, Louisiana

- Date: September 15, 2002
- Game time: 1:00 p.m.
- Game weather: None (indoor stadium)
- Game attendance: 67,958
- Referee: Johnny Grier (23)
- TV announcers (Fox): Dick Stockton, Daryl Johnston
- Recap, Game Book

Game information

First quarter

- NO – Deuce McAllister 4-yard run (John Carney kick), 9:19. Saints 7–0. Drive: 11 plays, 68 yards, 5:41.

Second quarter

- GB – Ryan Longwell 27-yard field goal, 10:23. Saints 7–3. Drive: 15 plays, 71 yards, 7:31.
- NO – Jerome Pathon 5-yard pass from Aaron Brooks (John Carney kick), 5:12. Saints 14–3. Drive: 5 plays, 21 yards, 2:53.
- NO – Donte Stallworth 34-yard pass from Aaron Brooks (John Carney kick), 2:03. Saints 21–3. Drive: 4 plays, 52 yards, 1:16.
- GB – Terry Glenn 14-yard pass from Brett Favre (Ryan Longwell kick), 0:40. Saints 21–10. Drive: 1 play, 14 yards, 0:08.

Third quarter

- NO – Keyuo Craver 28-yard fumble return (John Carney kick), 13:53. Saints 28–10.
- GB – Donald Driver 26-yard pass from Brett Favre (Ryan Longwell kick), 0:31. Saints 28–17. Drive: 6 plays, 71 yards, 2:31.

Fourth quarter

- GB – Ryan Longwell 36-yard field goal, 4:31. Saints 28–20. Drive: 12 plays, 61 yards, 6:03.
- NO – Deuce McAllister 2-yard run (John Carney kick), 2:00. Saints 35–20. Drive: 4 plays, 73 yards, 2:31.

Top passers

- GB – Brett Favre – 29/44, 270 yards, 2 TD, INT
- NO – Aaron Brooks – 16/28, 217 yards, 2 TD, 2 INT

Top rushers

- GB – Ahman Green – 17 rushes, 81 yards
- NO – Deuce McAllister – 21 rushes, 123 yards, 2 TD

Top receivers

- GB – Terry Glenn – 9 receptions, 81 yards, TD
- NO – Joe Horn – 6 receptions, 120 yards

==== Week 3: at Detroit Lions ====
Week 3: Green Bay Packers at Detroit Lions

Quarter	1	2	3	4	Total
Packers	7	10	14	6	37
Lions	7	10	0	14	31

at Ford Field, Detroit, Michigan

- Date: September 22, 2002
- Game time: 4:15 p.m.
- Game weather: None (indoor stadium)
- Game attendance: 61,505
- Referee: Bill Leavy (127)
- TV announcers (Fox): Joe Buck, Troy Aikman, Cris Collinsworth, Pam Oliver
- Recap, Game Book

Game information

First quarter

- DET – Az-Zahir Hakim 72-yard punt return (Jason Hanson kick), 12:27. Lions 7–0.
- GB – Marques Anderson 78-yard interception return (Ryan Longwell kick), 7:17. Tied 7–7.

Second quarter

- GB – Donald Driver 21-yard pass from Brett Favre (Ryan Longwell kick), 14:56. Packers 14–7. Drive: 10 plays, 82 yards, 6:14.
- DET – Jason Hanson 33-yard field goal, 10:00. Packers 14–10. Drive: 4 plays, −5 yards, 0:56.
- GB – Ryan Longwell 46-yard field goal, 5:15. Packers 17–10. Drive: 12 plays, 53 yards, 4:45.
- DET – Lamont Warren 39-yard pass from Joey Harrington (Jason Hanson kick), 3:13. Tied 17–17. Drive: 4 plays, 64 yards, 2:02.

Third quarter

- GB – Robert Ferguson 8-yard pass from Brett Favre (Ryan Longwell kick), 7:56. Packers 24–17. Drive: 12 plays, 72 yards, 7:04.
- GB – Bubba Franks 3-yard pass from Brett Favre (Ryan Longwell kick), 1:30. Packers 31–17. Drive: 4 plays, 41 yards, 1:29.

Fourth quarter

- GB – Ryan Longwell 34-yard field goal, 10:27. Packers 34–17. Drive: 11 plays, 44 yards, 4:44.
- DET – Cory Schlesinger 1-yard run (Jason Hanson kick), 8:23. Packers 34–24. Drive: 4 plays, 45 yards, 2:04.
- DET – James Stewart 52-yard pass from Joey Harrington (Jason Hanson kick), 1:37. Packers 34–31. Drive: 8 plays, 95 yards, 2:02.
- GB – Ryan Longwell 47-yard field goal, 1:15. Packers 37–31. Drive: 4 plays, 6 yards, 0:22.

Top passers

- GB – Brett Favre – 31/47, 357 yards, 3 TD, INT
- DET – Joey Harrington – 15/35, 182 yards, 2 TD, 4 INT

Top rushers

- GB – Najeh Davenport – 22 rushes, 84 yards
- DET – James Stewart – 14 rushes, 88 yards

Top receivers

- GB – Donald Driver – 5 receptions, 94 yards, TD
- DET – James Stewart – 2 receptions, 56 yards, TD

==== Week 4: vs. Carolina Panthers ====
Week 4: Carolina Panthers at Green Bay Packers

Quarter	1	2	3	4	Total
Panthers	7	0	0	7	14
Packers	3	7	0	7	17

at Lambeau Field, Green Bay, Wisconsin

- Date: September 29, 2002
- Game time: 1:00 p.m.
- Game weather: Overcast, 65 °F (18 °C)
- Game attendance: 63,329
- Referee: Bill Carollo (63)
- TV announcers (FOX): Pat Summerall and Brian Baldinger
- Recap, Game Book

Game information

First quarter

- GB – Ryan Longwell 30-yard field goal, 8:52. Packers 3–0. Drive: 11 plays, 73 yards, 5:07.
- CAR – Lamar Smith 3-yard run (Shayne Graham kick), 0:23. Panthers 7–3. Drive: 8 plays, 83 yards, 4:50.

Second quarter

- GB – Donald Driver 31-yard pass from Bubba Franks (Ryan Longwell kick), 1:43. Packers 10–7. Drive: 6 plays, 70 yards, 2:04.

Third quarter

- No scoring plays.

Fourth quarter

- CAR – Lamar Smith 2-yard run (Shayne Graham kick), 12:55. Panthers 14–10. Drive: 5 plays, 53 yards, 2:51.
- GB – Donald Driver 22-yard pass from Brett Favre (Ryan Longwell kick), 4:10. Packers 17–14. Drive: 4 plays, 65 yards, 2:19.

Top passers

- CAR – Rodney Peete – 10/24, 202 yards
- GB – Brett Favre – 18/32, 200 yards, TD, INT

Top rushers

- CAR – Lamar Smith – 22 rushes, 66 yards, 2 TD
- GB – Ahman Green – 17 rushes, 73 yards

Top receivers

- CAR – Steve Smith Sr. – 5 receptions, 116 yards
- GB – Donald Driver – 5 receptions, 97 yards, 2 TD

==== Week 5: at Chicago Bears ====
Week 5: Green Bay Packers at Chicago Bears

Quarter	1	2	3	4	Total
Packers	14	10	7	3	34
Bears	7	7	0	7	21

at Memorial Stadium, Champaign, Illinois

- Date: October 7, 2002
- Game time: 9:00 p.m.
- Game weather: Clear, 46 °F (8 °C)
- Game attendance: 63,226
- Referee: Ed Hochuli (85)
- TV announcers (ABC): Al Michaels, John Madden and Melissa Stark
- Recap, Game Book

Game information

First quarter

- GB – Donald Driver 85-yard pass from Brett Favre (Ryan Longwell kick), 10:56. Packers 7–0. Drive: 1 play, 85 yards, 0:12.
- GB – Tyrone Davis 19-yard pass from Brett Favre (Ryan Longwell kick), 3:32. Packers 14–0. Drive: 10 plays, 76 yards, 5:14.
- CHI – Marty Booker 4-yard pass from Jim Miller (Paul Edinger kick), 1:53. Packers 14–7. Drive: 3 plays, 37 yards, 1:39.

Second quarter

- GB – Bubba Franks 5-yard pass from Brett Favre (Ryan Longwell kick), 13:02. Packers 21–7. Drive: 8 plays, 74 yards, 3:51.
- CHI – John Davis 1-yard pass from Jim Miller (Paul Edinger kick), 2:50. Packers 21–14. Drive: 3 plays, 4 yards, 0:56.
- GB – Ryan Longwell 49-yard field goal, 0:00. Packers 24–14. Drive: 6 plays, 32 yards, 0:38.

Third quarter

- GB – Kabeer Gbaja-Biamila 72-yard interception return (Ryan Longwell kick), 8:53. Packers 31–14.

Fourth quarter

- GB – Ryan Longwell 35-yard field goal, 13:21. Packers 34–14. Drive: 7 plays, 48 yards, 2:44.
- CHI – John Davis 21-yard pass from Jim Miller (Paul Edinger kick), 6:50. Packers 34–21. Drive: 9 plays, 62 yards, 2:12.

Top passers

- GB – Brett Favre – 22/33, 359 yards, 3 TD
- CHI – Jim Miller – 27/49, 353 yards, 3 TD, 3 INT

Top rushers

- GB – Ahman Green – 27 rushes, 107 yards
- CHI – Anthony Thomas – 15 rushes, 45 yards

Top receivers

- GB – Terry Glenn – 8 receptions, 154 yards
- CHI – Marty Booker – 12 receptions, 141 yards, TD

==== Week 6: at New England Patriots ====
Week 6: Green Bay Packers (4–1) at New England Patriots (3–2) – Game summary

Quarter	1	2	3	4	Total
Packers	0	14	7	7	28
Patriots	0	3	0	7	10

at Gillette Stadium, Foxborough, Massachusetts

- Date: October 13, 2002
- Game time: 1:00 p.m.
- Game weather: Overcast, 61 °F (16 °C)
- Game attendance: 68,436
- Referee: Bernie Kukar (86)
- TV announcers (FOX): Dick Stockton, Troy Aikman, Cris Collinsworth, and Pam Oliver
- Recap, Game Book

Game information

First quarter

- No scoring plays.

Second quarter

- NE – Adam Vinatieri 32-yard field goal, 9:36. Patriots 3–0. Drive: 10 plays, 50 yards, 3:58.
- GB – William Henderson 3-yard pass from Brett Favre (Ryan Longwell kick), 3:46. Packers 7–3. Drive: 12 plays, 76 yards, 5:50.
- GB – Ahman Green 8-yard pass from Brett Favre (Ryan Longwell kick), 3:03. Packers 14–3. Drive: 1 play, 8 yards, 0:05.

Third quarter

- GB – Bubba Franks 2-yard pass from Brett Favre (Ryan Longwell kick), 3:50. Packers 21–3. Drive: 7 plays, 94 yards, 4:05.

Fourth quarter

- GB – Ahman Green 1-yard run (Ryan Longwell kick), 12:09. Packers 28–3. Drive: 7 plays, 65 yards, 4:16.
- NE – David Givens 4-yard pass from Tom Brady (Adam Vinatieri kick), 5:57. Packers 28–10. Drive: 6 plays, 44 yards, 2:03.

Top passers

- GB – Brett Favre – 17/27, 147 yards, 3 TD
- NE – Tom Brady – 24/44, 183 yards, TD, 3 INT

Top rushers

- GB – Ahman Green – 31 rushes, 136 yards, TD
- NE – Antowain Smith – 13 rushes, 75 yards

Top receivers

- GB – Bubba Franks – 5 receptions, 46 yards, TD
- NE – Deion Branch – 5 receptions, 38 yards

==== Week 7: vs. Washington Redskins ====
Week 7: Washington Redskins at Green Bay Packers

Quarter	1	2	3	4	Total
Redskins	3	3	3	0	9
Packers	7	10	0	13	30

at Lambeau Field, Green Bay, Wisconsin

- Date: October 20, 2002
- Game time: 4:15 p.m.
- Game weather: Partly cloudy, 44 °F (7 °C)
- Game attendance: 63,363
- Referee: Jeff Triplette (42)
- TV announcers (FOX): Sam Rosen, Bill Maas, Drew Smith
- Recap, Game Book

Game information

First quarter

- WAS – James Tuthill 25-yard field goal, 8:50. Redskins 3–0. Drive: 12 plays, 64 yards, 6:10.
- GB – Ahman Green 24-yard run (Ryan Longwell kick), 4:21. Packers 7–3. Drive: 8 plays, 69 yards, 4:29.

Second quarter

- WAS – James Tuthill 53-yard field goal, 7:57. Packers 7–6. Drive: 12 plays, 40 yards, 5:23.
- GB – Ahman Green 2-yard run (Ryan Longwell kick), 5:07. Packers 14–6. Drive: 5 plays, 73 yards, 2:50.
- GB – Ryan Longwell 36-yard field goal, 1:23. Packers 17–6. Drive: 5 plays, 37 yards, 2:03.

Third quarter

- WAS – James Tuthill 31-yard field goal, 5:55. Packers 17–9. Drive: 8 plays, 38 yards, 4:28.

Fourth quarter

- GB – Ryan Longwell 41-yard field goal, 9:21. Packers 20–9. Drive: 7 plays, 16 yards, 3:31.
- GB – Ahman Green 8-yard run (Ryan Longwell kick), 7:48. Packers 27–9. Drive: 3 plays, 23 yards, 1:14.
- GB – Ryan Longwell 28-yard field goal, 0:22. Packers 30–9. Drive: 9 plays, 27 yards, 5:36.

Top passers

- WAS – Patrick Ramsey – 10/24, 135 yards
- GB – Brett Favre – 11/14, 89 yards

Top rushers

- WAS – Stephen Davis – 24 rushes, 91 yards
- GB – Ahman Green – 24 rushes, 88 yards, 3 TD

Top receivers

- WAS – Derrius Thompson – 5 receptions, 89 yards
- GB – Donald Driver – 4 receptions, 44 yards

==== Week 9: vs. Miami Dolphins ====
Week 9: Miami Dolphins (5–2) at Green Bay Packers (6–1) – Game summary

Quarter	1	2	3	4	Total
Dolphins	0	0	0	10	10
Packers	0	14	10	0	24

at Lambeau Field, Green Bay, Wisconsin

- Date: November 4, 2002
- Game time: 9:00 p.m.
- Game weather: Clear, 30 °F (−1 °C)
- Game attendance: 63,284
- Referee: Tom White (123)
- TV announcers (ABC): Al Michaels, John Madden and Melissa Stark
- Recap, Game Book

Game information

First quarter

- No scoring plays.

Second quarter

- GB – Ahman Green 1-yard run (Ryan Longwell kick), 10:25. Packers 7–0. Drive: 8 plays, 52 yards, 4:27.
- GB – Ahman Green 23-yard pass from Brett Favre (Ryan Longwell kick), 0:46. Packers 14–0. Drive: 4 plays, 44 yards, 1:00.

Third quarter

- GB – Ryan Longwell 27-yard field goal, 9:52. Packers 17–0. Drive: 7 plays, 58 yards, 3:58.
- GB – Darren Sharper 89-yard interception return (Ryan Longwell kick), 0:00. Packers 24–0.

Fourth quarter

- MIA – Olindo Mare 46-yard field goal, 8:20. Packers 24–3. Drive: 9 plays, 24 yards, 3:59.
- MIA – Ray Lucas 1-yard run (Olindo Mare kick), 1:31. Packers 24–10. Drive: 9 plays, 73 yards, 1:53.

Top passers

- MIA – Ray Lucas – 22/39, 198 yards, 2 INT
- GB – Brett Favre – 16/25, 187 yards, TD, INT

Top rushers

- MIA – Ray Lucas – 9 rushes, 49 yards, TD
- GB – Ahman Green – 19 rushes, 72 yards, TD

Top receivers

- MIA – Chris Chambers – 5 receptions, 55 yards
- GB – Ahman Green – 6 receptions, 71 yards, TD

==== Week 10: vs. Detroit Lions ====
Week 10: Detroit Lions at Green Bay Packers

Quarter	1	2	3	4	Total
Lions	7	0	0	7	14
Packers	3	27	10	0	40

at Lambeau Field, Green Bay, Wisconsin

- Date: November 10, 2002
- Game time: 1:00 p.m.
- Game weather: Cloudy, 50 °F (10 °C)
- Game attendance: 63,329
- Referee: Dick Hantak (105)
- TV announcers (FOX): Joe Buck, Troy Aikman, Cris Collinsworth, Pam Oliver
- Recap, Game Book

Game information

First quarter

- GB – Ryan Longwell 30-yard field goal, 7:47. Packers 3–0. Drive: 13 plays, 74 yards, 7:13.
- DET – Az-Zahir Hakim 64-yard pass from Joey Harrington (Jason Hanson kick), 7:32. Lions 7–3. Drive: 1 play, 64 yards, 0:15.

Second quarter

- GB – Bubba Franks 4-yard pass from Brett Favre (Ryan Longwell kick), 14:35. Packers 10–7. Drive: 9 plays, 64 yards, 4:52.
- GB – Ryan Longwell 40-yard field goal, 8:57. Packers 13–7. Drive: 9 plays, 65 yards, 4:03.
- GB – Ryan Longwell 36-yard field goal, 5:51. Packers 16–7. Drive: 7 plays, 17 yards, 1:47.
- GB - Marques Anderson 14-yard interception return (Ryan Longwell kick), 1:47. Packers 23–7.
- GB – Najeh Davenport 1-yard run (Ryan Longwell kick), 0:17. Packers 30–7. Drive: 6 plays, 68 yards, 1:03.

Third quarter

- GB – Ryan Longwell 33-yard field goal, 10:31. Packers 33–7. Drive: 6 plays, 51 yards, 2:35.
- GB – William Henderson 9-yard pass from Brett Favre (Ryan Longwell kick), 4:55. Packers 40–7. Drive: 9 plays, 69 yards, 4:21.

Fourth quarter

- DET – Mikhael Ricks 1-yard pass from Joey Harrington (Jason Hanson kick), 10:46. Packers 40–14. Drive: 5 plays, 65 yards, 1:56.

Top passers

- DET – Joey Harrington – 20/44, 236 yards, 2 TD, 2 INT
- GB – Brett Favre – 26/39, 351 yards, 2 TD

Top rushers

- DET – James Stewart – 15 rushes, 122 yards
- GB – Najeh Davenport – 10 rushes, 73 yards, TD

Top receivers

- DET – Az-Zahir Hakim – 7 receptions, 143 yards, TD
- GB – Donald Driver – 11 receptions, 130 yards

==== Week 11: at Minnesota Vikings ====
Week 11: Green Bay Packers (8–1) at Minnesota Vikings (2–7) – Game summary

Quarter	1	2	3	4	Total
Packers	0	7	7	7	21
Vikings	14	0	7	10	31

at Hubert H. Humphrey Metrodome, Minneapolis, Minnesota

- Date: November 17, 2002
- Game time: 1:00 p.m.
- Game weather: None (indoor stadium)
- Game attendance: 64,153
- Referee: Ron Blum (7)
- TV announcers (FOX): Dick Stockton, Daryl Johnston, Jeff Grayson
- Recap, Game Book

Game information

First quarter

- MIN – Randy Moss 24-yard pass from Daunte Culpepper (Gary Anderson kick), 12:32. Vikings 7–0. Drive: 5 plays, 79 yards, 2:28.
- MIN – D'Wayne Bates 18-yard pass from Daunte Culpepper (Gary Anderson kick), 6:51. Vikings 14–0. Drive: 6 plays, 65 yards, 3:20.

Second quarter

- GB – Ahman Green 1-yard run (Ryan Longwell kick), 0:43. Vikings 14–7. Drive: 8 plays, 63 yards, 3:04.

Third quarter

- MIN – Daunte Culpepper 1-yard run (Gary Anderson kick), 9:00. Vikings 21–7. Drive: 9 plays, 81 yards, 4:20.
- GB – Bubba Franks 1-yard pass from Brett Favre (Ryan Longwell kick), 5:36. Vikings 21–14. Drive: 8 plays, 72 yards, 3:24.

Fourth quarter

- GB – Donald Driver 84-yard pass from Brett Favre (Ryan Longwell kick), 11:53. Tied 21–21. Drive: 3 plays, 84 yards, 1:27.
- MIN – Gary Anderson 32-yard field goal, 7:16. Vikings 24–21. Drive: 7 plays, 19 yards, 4:37.
- MIN – Moe Williams 3-yard run (Gary Anderson kick), 1:56. Vikings 31–21. Drive: 6 plays, 80 yards, 2:24.

Top passers

- GB – Brett Favre – 24/43, 296 yards, 2 TD, 3 INT
- MIN – Daunte Culpepper – 13/26, 217 yards, 2 TD, 2 INT

Top rushers

- GB – Ahman Green – 18 rushes, 71 yards, TD
- MIN – Michael Bennett – 20 rushes, 130 yards

Top receivers

- GB – Donald Driver – 4 receptions, 121 yards, TD
- MIN – Randy Moss – 6 receptions, 115 yards, TD

==== Week 12: at Tampa Bay Buccaneers ====
Week 12: Green Bay Packers at Tampa Bay Buccaneers

Quarter	1	2	3	4	Total
Packers	7	0	0	0	7
Buccaneers	0	3	11	7	21

at Raymond James Stadium, Tampa Bay, Florida

- Date: November 24, 2002
- Game time: 4:15 p.m.
- Game weather: Clear, 70 °F (21 °C)
- Game attendance: 65,672
- Referee: Johnny Grier (23)
- TV announcers (FOX): Joe Buck, Troy Aikman, Cris Collinsworth, and Pam Oliver
- Recap, Game Book

Game information

First quarter

- GB – Donald Driver 4-yard pass from Brett Favre (Ryan Longwell kick), 5:44. Packers 7–0. Drive: 6 plays, 30 yards, 2:57.

Second quarter

- TB – Martin Gramatica 38-yard field goal, 0:00. Packers 7–3. Drive: 3 plays, 39 yards, 0:23.

Third quarter

- TB – Martin Gramatica 51-yard field goal, 7:33. Packers 7–6. Drive: 7 plays, 27 yards, 2:57.
- TB – Joe Jurevicius 4-yard pass from Brad Johnson (Brad Johnson–Keyshawn Johnson pass), 5:00. Buccaneers 14–7. Drive: 4 plays, 18 yards, 2:13.

Fourth quarter

- TB – Ken Dilger 3-yard pass from Brad Johnson (Martin Gramatica kick), 7:24. Buccaneers 21–7. Drive: 3 plays, 2 yards, 1:18.

Top passers

- GB – Brett Favre – 20/38, 196 yards, TD, 4 INT
- TB – Brad Johnson – 15/25, 134 yards, 2 TD

Top rushers

- GB – Ahman Green – 18 rushes, 56 yards
- TB – Michael Pittman Sr. – 13 rushes, 50 yards

Top receivers

- GB – Terry Glenn – 4 receptions, 61 yards
- TB – Keyshawn Johnson – 2 receptions, 48 yards

==== Week 13: vs. Chicago Bears ====
Week 13: Chicago Bears at Green Bay Packers

Quarter	1	2	3	4	Total
Bears	7	7	0	6	20
Packers	3	3	10	14	30

at Lambeau Field, Green Bay, Wisconsin

- Date: December 1, 2002
- Game time: 1:00 p.m.
- Game weather: Cloudy, 23 °F (−5 °C)
- Game attendance: 64,196
- Referee: Ron Winter (14)
- TV announcers (FOX): Dick Stockton, Daryl Johnston and Ron Pitts
- Recap, Game Book

Game information

First quarter

- CHI – Dustin Lyman 12-yard pass from Brad Maynard (Paul Edinger kick), 2:31. Bears 7–0. Drive: 4 plays, 18 yards, 1:14.
- GB – Ryan Longwell 21-yard field goal, 2:31. Bears 7–3. Drive: 7 plays, 46 yards, 3:15.

Second quarter

- CHI – Dustin Lyman 8-yard pass from Jim Miller (Paul Edinger kick), 5:20. Bears 14–3. Drive: 12 plays, 72 yards, 6:04.
- GB – Ryan Longwell 31-yard field goal, 1:03. Bears 14–6. Drive: 11 plays, 52 yards, 4:17.

Third quarter

- GB – Bubba Franks 6-yard pass from Brett Favre (Ryan Longwell kick), 11:43. Bears 14–13. Drive: 7 plays, 62 yards, 3:17.
- GB – Ryan Longwell 27-yard field goal, 1:05. Packers 16–14. Drive: 14 plays, 90 yards, 6:21.

Fourth quarter

- GB – William Henderson 1-yard pass from Brett Favre (Ryan Longwell kick), 8:09. Packers 23–14. Drive: 7 plays, 35 yards, 3:39.
- GB – Tony Fisher 2-yard run (Ryan Longwell kick), 1:10. Packers 30–14. Drive: 7 plays, 58 yards, 2:11.
- CHI – Marcus Robinson 45-yard pass from Henry Burris (pass failed), 0:10. Packers 30–20. Drive: 4 plays, 68 yards, 1:00.

Top passers

- CHI – Jim Miller – 25/36, 191 yards, TD, INT
- GB – Brett Favre – 24/42, 221 yards, 2 TD, INT

Top rushers

- CHI – Leon Johnson – 11 rushes, 46 yards
- GB – Tony Fisher – 17 rushes, 91 yards, TD

Top receivers

- CHI – Dustin Lyman – 7 receptions, 58 yards, 2 TD
- GB – Donald Driver – 5 receptions, 65 yards

==== Week 14: vs. Minnesota Vikings ====
Week 14: Minnesota Vikings (3–9) at Green Bay Packers (9–3) – Game summary

Quarter	1	2	3	4	Total
Vikings	10	3	9	0	22
Packers	0	6	7	13	26

at Lambeau Field, Green Bay, Wisconsin

- Date: December 8, 2002
- Game time: 8:35 p.m.
- Game weather: Clear skies, 11 °F (−12 °C)
- Game attendance: 64,070
- Referee: Walt Coleman (65)
- TV announcers (ESPN): Mike Patrick, Joe Theismann and Suzy Kolber
- Recap, Game Book

Game information

First quarter

- MIN – Gary Anderson 23-yard field goal, 6:16. Vikings 10–0. Drive: 12 plays, 65 yards, 6:50.
- MIN – Randy Moss 3-yard pass from Daunte Culpepper (Gary Anderson kick), 1:02. Vikings 10–0. Drive: 4 plays, 30 yards, 2:00.

Second quarter

- MIN – Gary Anderson 22-yard field goal, 12:55. Vikings 13–0. Drive: 6 plays, 19 yards, 2:05.
- GB – Ryan Longwell 33-yard field goal, 6:43. Vikings 13–3. Drive: 11 plays, 59 yards, 6:12.
- GB – Ryan Longwell 19-yard field goal, 0:00. Vikings 13–6. Drive: 12 plays, 51 yards, 5:22.

Third quarter

- MIN – Daunte Culpepper 3-yard run (kick blocked), 11:29. Vikings 19–6. Drive: 7 plays, 74 yards, 3:31.
- GB – Robert Ferguson 21-yard pass from Brett Favre (Ryan Longwell kick), 7:57. Vikings 19–13. Drive: 8 plays, 67 yards, 3:32.
- MIN – Gary Anderson 37-yard field goal, 6:00. Vikings 22–13. Drive: 6 plays, 41 yards, 1:57.

Fourth quarter

- GB – Robert Ferguson 40-yard pass from Brett Favre (Ryan Longwell kick), 10:48. Vikings 22–20. Drive: 6 plays, 54 yards, 2:36.
- GB – Tony Fisher 14-yard run (run failed), 1:06. Packers 26–22. Drive: 9 plays, 85 yards, 3:26.

Top passers

- MIN – Daunte Culpepper – 15/28, 136 yards, TD, INT
- GB – Brett Favre – 22/32, 214 yards, 2 TD, INT

Top rushers

- MIN – Michael Bennett – 19 rushes, 120 yards
- GB – Tony Fisher – 25 rushes, 96 yards, TD

Top receivers

- MIN – D'Wayne Bates – 5 receptions, 71 yards
- GB – Robert Ferguson – 6 receptions, 105 yards, 2 TD

The game notably had a brawl between both sides after a game sealing pick.

==== Week 15: at San Francisco 49ers ====
Week 15: Green Bay Packers at San Francisco 49ers

Quarter	1	2	3	4	Total
Packers	3	0	14	3	20
49ers	0	6	8	0	14

at 3Com Park, San Francisco, California

- Date: December 15, 2002
- Game time: 4:15 p.m.
- Game weather: Light Rain, 58 °F (14 °C)
- Game attendance: 67,947
- Referee: Tony Corrente (99)
- TV announcers (FOX): Joe Buck, Troy Aikman, Cris Collinsworth, and Pam Oliver
- Recap, Game Book

Game information

First quarter

- GB – Ryan Longwell 48-yard field goao, 2:12. Packers 3–0. Drive: 10 plays, 16 yards, 4:37.

Second quarter

- SF – Jeff Chandler 47-yard field goal, 9:34. Tied 3–3. Drive: 5 plays, 23 yards, 1:46.
- SF – Jeff Chandler 42-yard field goal, 0:07. 49ers 6–3. Drive: 13 plays, 44 yards, 3:52.

Third quarter

- GB – Ahman Green 9-yard run (Ryan Longwell kick), 11:02. Packers 10–6. Drive: 9 plays, 79 yards, 3:58.
- GB – Donald Driver 5-yard pass from Brett Favre (Ryan Longwell kick), 5:35. Packers 17–6. Drive: 6 plays, 29 yards, 3:19.
- SF – Terrell Owens 45-yard pass from Jeff Garcia (Jeff Garcia run), 1:04. Packers 17–14. Drive: 8 plays, 73 yards, 4:31.

Fourth quarter

- GB – Ryan Longwell 28-yard field goal, 4:41. Packers 20–14. Drive: 11 plays, 53 yards, 4:59.

Top passers

- GB – Brett Favre – 25/33, 201 yards, TD
- SF – Jeff Garcia – 19/34, 156 yards, TD, INT

Top rushers

- GB – Ahman Green – 24 rushes, 90 yards, TD
- SF – Garrison Hearst – 12 rushes, 51 yards

Top receivers

- GB – Terry Glenn – 3 receptions, 46 yards
- SF – Terrell Owens – 8 receptions, 75 yards, TD

==== Week 16: vs. Buffalo Bills ====
Week 16: Buffalo Bills (7–7) at Green Bay Packers (11–3) – Game summary

Quarter	1	2	3	4	Total
Bills	0	0	0	0	0
Packers	0	3	0	7	10

at Lambeau Field, Green Bay, Wisconsin

- Date: December 22, 2002
- Game time: 1:00 p.m.
- Game weather: Snow flurries, 27 °F (−3 °C)
- Game attendance: 64,106
- Referee: Tom White (123)
- TV announcers (CBS): Kevin Harlan, Randy Cross and Beasley Reece
- Recap, Game Book

Game information

First quarter

- No scoring plays.

Second quarter

- GB – Ryan Longwell 33-yard field goal, 3:57. Packers 3–0. Drive: 10 plays, 37 yards, 4:15.

Third quarter

- No scoring plays.

Fourth quarter

- GB – Donald Driver 11-yard pass from Brett Favre (Ryan Longwell kick), 7:23. Packers 10–0. Drive: 4 plays, 39 yards, 1:30.

Top passers

- BUF – Drew Bledsoe – 18/36, 179 yards, 2 INT
- GB – Brett Favre – 15/33, 114 yards, TD, 2 INT

Top rushers

- BUF – Travis Henry – 20 rushes, 46 yards
- GB – Ahman Green – 26 rushes, 116 yards

Top receivers

- BUF – Eric Moulds – 5 receptions, 45 yards
- GB – Donald Driver – 5 receptions, 52 yards, TD

==== Week 17: at New York Jets ====
Week 17: Green Bay Packers (12–3) at New York Jets (8–7) – Game summary

Quarter	1	2	3	4	Total
Packers	0	10	0	7	17
Jets	0	14	14	14	42

at Giants Stadium, East Rutherford, New Jersey

- Date: December 29, 2002
- Game time: 4:15 p.m.
- Game weather: Cloudy, 40 °F (4 °C)
- Game attendance: 78,733
- Referee: Dick Hantak (105)
- TV announcers (Fox): Dick Stockton, Daryl Johnston and John DiScepolo
- Recap, Game Book

Game information

First quarter

- No scoring plays.

Second quarter

- NYJ – Richie Anderson 1-yard pass from Chad Pennington (John Hall kick), 14:02. Jets 7–0. Drive: 10 plays, 84 yards, 5:33.
- GB – Ryan Longwell 23-yard field goal, 4:26. Jets 7–3. Drive: 11 plays, 57 yards, 5:31.
- NYJ – Wayne Chrebet 12-yard pass from Chad Pennington (John Hall kick), 1:46. Jets 14–3. Drive: 8 plays, 67 yards, 2:42.
- GB – Terry Glenn 14-yard pass from Brett Favre (Ryan Longwell kick), 0:14. Jets 14–10. Drive: 10 plays, 76 yards, 1:35.

Third quarter

- NYJ – Curtis Martin 5-yard run (John Hall kick), 11:55. Jets 21–10. Drive: 6 plays, 60 yards, 3:14.
- NYJ – Santana Moss 13-yard pass from Chad Pennington (John Hall kick), 7:02. Jets 28–10. Drive: 7 plays, 76 yards, 3:41.

Fourth quarter

- NYJ – Wayne Chrebet 18-yard pass from Chad Pennington (John Hall kick), 14:53. Jets 35–10. Drive: 6 plays, 32 yards, 3:25.
- GB – Bubba Franks 20-yard pass from Doug Pederson (Ryan Longwell kick), 6:05. Jets 35–17. Drive: 10 plays, 53 yards, 4:55.
- NYJ – LaMont Jordan 3-yard run (John Hall kick), 2:20. Jets 42–17. Drive: 6 plays, 28 yards, 3:21.

Top passers

- GB – Brett Favre – 16/33, 172 yards, TD, INT
- NYJ – Chad Pennington – 17/24, 196 yards, 4 TD

Top rushers

- GB – Ahman Green – 14 rushes, 67 yards
- NYJ – Curtis Martin – 18 rushes, 83 yards, TD

Top receivers

- GB – Terry Glenn – 5 receptions, 76 yards, TD
- NYJ – Laveranues Coles – 6 receptions, 93 yards

=== Standings ===
==== Division ====
NFC North
	W	L	T	PCT	DIV	CONF	PF	PA	STK
^{(3)} Green Bay Packers	12	4	0	.750	5–1	9–3	398	328	L1
Minnesota Vikings	6	10	0	.375	4–2	5–7	390	442	W3
Chicago Bears	4	12	0	.250	2–4	3–9	281	379	L2
Detroit Lions	3	13	0	.188	1–5	3–9	306	451	L8

==== Conference ====
NFC
#	Team	Division	W	L	T	PCT	DIV	CONF	SOS	SOV
Division leaders
1 (Note: Philadelphia finished ahead of Tampa Bay and Green Bay based on conference record (11–1 vs 9–3/9–3).)	Philadelphia Eagles	East	12	4	0	.750	5–1	11–1	.469	.432
2 (Note: Tampa Bay finished ahead of Green Bay based on head-to-head victory.)	Tampa Bay Buccaneers	South	12	4	0	.750	4–2	9–3	.482	.432
3	Green Bay Packers	North	12	4	0	.750	5–1	9–3	.451	.414
4	San Francisco 49ers	West	10	6	0	.625	5–1	8–4	.504	.450
Wild Cards
5	New York Giants	East	10	6	0	.625	5–1	8–4	.482	.450
6	Atlanta Falcons	South	9	6	1	.594	4–2	7–5	.494	.429
Did not qualify for the postseason
7	New Orleans Saints	South	9	7	0	.563	3–3	7–5	.498	.566
8 (Note: St. Louis finished ahead of Seattle based on division record (4–2 to 2–4).)	St. Louis Rams	West	7	9	0	.438	4–2	5–7	.508	.446
9	Seattle Seahawks	West	7	9	0	.438	2–4	5–7	.506	.433
10 (Note: Washington finished ahead of Carolina based on common games (2–3 to 1–4))	Washington Redskins	East	7	9	0	.438	1–5	4–8	.527	.438
11	Carolina Panthers	South	7	9	0	.438	1–5	4–8	.486	.357
12	Minnesota Vikings	North	6	10	0	.375	4–2	5–7	.498	.417
13 (Note: Arizona finished ahead of Dallas based on head-to-head victory.)	Arizona Cardinals	West	5	11	0	.313	1–5	5–7	.500	.400
14	Dallas Cowboys	East	5	11	0	.313	1–5	3–9	.500	.475
15	Chicago Bears	North	4	12	0	.250	2–4	3–9	.521	.430
16	Detroit Lions	North	3	13	0	.188	1–5	3–9	.494	.375
Tiebreakers (Note: When breaking ties for three or more teams under the NFL's rules, they are first broken within divisions, then comparing only the highest-ranked remaining team from each division.)

== Playoffs ==
=== Schedule ===
Week	Date	Opponent	Result	Record	Venue	Attendance
Wild Card	January 4, 2003	Atlanta Falcons	L 7–27	0–1	Lambeau Field	65,358

=== Game summaries ===
==== NFC Wild Card: vs. Atlanta Falcons ====
NFC Wild Card Game: (6) Atlanta Falcons at (3) Green Bay Packers

Quarter	1	2	3	4	Total
Falcons	14	10	3	0	27
Packers	0	0	7	0	7

at Lambeau Field, Green Bay, Wisconsin

- Date: January 4, 2003
- Game time: 8:00 p.m.
- Game weather: Clear, 31 °F (−1 °C)
- Game attendance: 65,358
- Referee: Bernie Kukar (86)
- TV announcers (ABC): Al Michaels, John Madden and Melissa Stark
- Recap, Game Book

Game information

First quarter

- ATL – Shawn Jefferson 10-yard pass from Michael Vick (Jay Feely kick), 9:17. Falcons 7–0. Drive: 10 plays, 76 yards, 5:43.
- ATL – Artie Ulmer 1-yard return of blocked punt (Jay Feely kick), 6:38. Falcons 14–0.

Second quarter

- ATL – TJ Duckett 6-yard run (Jay Feely kick), 12:06. Falcons 21–0. Drive: 4 plays, 21 yards, 2:30.
- ATL – Jay Feely 22-yard field goal, 0:00. Falcons 24–0. Drive: 16 plays, 90 yards, 6:34.

Third quarter

- GB – Donald Driver 14-yard pass from Brett Favre (Ryan Longwell kick), 10:26. Falcons 24–7. Drive: 10 plays, 73 yards, 4:34.
- ATL – Jay Feely 23-yard field goal, 3:43. Falcons 27–7. Drive: 12 plays, 73 yards, 6:43.

Fourth quarter

- No scoring plays.

Top passers

- ATL – Michael Vick – 13/25, 117 yards, TD
- GB – Brett Favre – 20/42, 247 yards, TD, 2 INT

Top rushers

- ATL – Michael Vick – 10 rushes, 64 yards
- GB – Ahman Green – 11 rushes, 34 yards

Top receivers

- ATL – Warrick Dunn – 4 receptions, 40 yards
- GB – Javon Walker – 5 receptions, 104 yards

== Awards and records ==
- Brett Favre, NFC Leader, Attempts (551)
- Brett Favre, NFC Leader, Completions (341)
- Brett Favre, NFC Leader(tied), Touchdown Passes (27)
