= Basil Mitchell =

Basil Mitchell may refer to:

- Basil Mitchell (American football) (born 1975), former National Football League running back
- Basil Mitchell (academic) (1917–2011), British philosopher
