= Antuan Edwards =

American football player (born 1977)

No. 24, 21, 42
- Position: Safety

Personal information
- Born: May 26, 1977 (age 49); Starkville, Mississippi, U.S.
- Listed height: 6 ft 1 in (1.85 m)
- Listed weight: 210 lb (95 kg)

Career information
- High school: Starkville (MS)
- College: Clemson
- NFL draft: 1999: 1st round, 25th overall pick

Career history
- Green Bay Packers (1999–2003); Miami Dolphins (2004); St. Louis Rams (2004); New England Patriots (2005)*; Atlanta Falcons (2005); Washington Redskins (2006)*
- * Offseason or practice squad member only

Awards and highlights
- Second-team All-ACC (1997)

Career NFL statistics
- Games played: 71
- Tackles: 244
- Interceptions: 7
- Sacks: 3
- Stats at Pro Football Reference

Antuan Minye' Edwards (born May 26, 1977) is an American former professional football player who was a safety in the National Football League (NFL). Edwards was selected by the Green Bay Packers in the first round (25th overall) of the 1999 NFL draft out of Clemson University.

== Early life and college ==
He attended Starkville High School in Mississippi, where he played quarterback, safety, and running back. He was named All-American as a safety in his senior year. At Clemson, he started thirty-three games and recorded a total of 219 tackles, with eight interceptions. During his senior year, he was a first-team All-Atlantic Coast Conference and was a finalist for the Jim Thorpe Award.

== Professional career ==
=== Early career ===
Edwards was selected in the first round of the 1999 NFL Draft by the Green Bay Packers, the first of three consecutive defensive backs the Packers would take in that draft; the others being Fred Vinson and Mike McKenzie.

Edwards would play all sixteen games of his rookie season, starting one of them. During the course of the year, he made a total of thirty tackles (twenty-six solo), had four interceptions including one returned for a touchdown, and was named to the College & Pro Football Weekly All-Rookie team. The following season, he started three games but saw his tackle total go down to twenty-five, while defending nine passes and two interceptions. Edwards only played in three games in 2001 when he suffered a knee injury and was placed on injured reserve. In 2002, he started the season as the team's starting safety, but was replaced early on by rookie Marques Anderson following a forearm injury. He spent the rest of the season as a backup and totaled forty-four tackles.

=== Later career ===
He beat out Anderson for the starting job in 2003 and started a career-high twelve games, and recorded 51 tackles. He would finish the season on injured reserve following a late-season injury. He left the Packers at the end of the season to join the Miami Dolphins. He started eight games for the team and had 35 tackles when he was released from the team. He was claimed by the St. Louis Rams, where he ended the season with five starts and 30 more tackles. Edwards then signed with the New England Patriots but was cut, and signed with the Atlanta Falcons. He started one game and had eleven tackles for the season, but was cut early on. He joined the Washington Redskins, but was released early in camp.

=== NFL statistics ===
Year	Team	Games	Combined tackles	Tackles	Assisted tackles	Sacks	Interceptions	Forced fumbles	Fumble recoveries
1999	GB	16	31	26	5	0.0	4	0	0
2000	GB	12	26	21	5	0.0	2	0	0
2001	GB	3	5	5	0	0.0	0	0	1
2002	GB	12	44	28	16	1.0	0	1	1
2003	GB	10	51	43	8	1.0	0	0	0
2004	STL	6	30	24	6	0.0	1	0	0
2004	MIA	8	35	23	12	1.0	0	1	0
2005	ATL	4	11	11	0	0.0	0	0	0
Career		71	233	181	52	3.0	7	2	2
