= Vonnie Holliday =

American football player (born 1975)

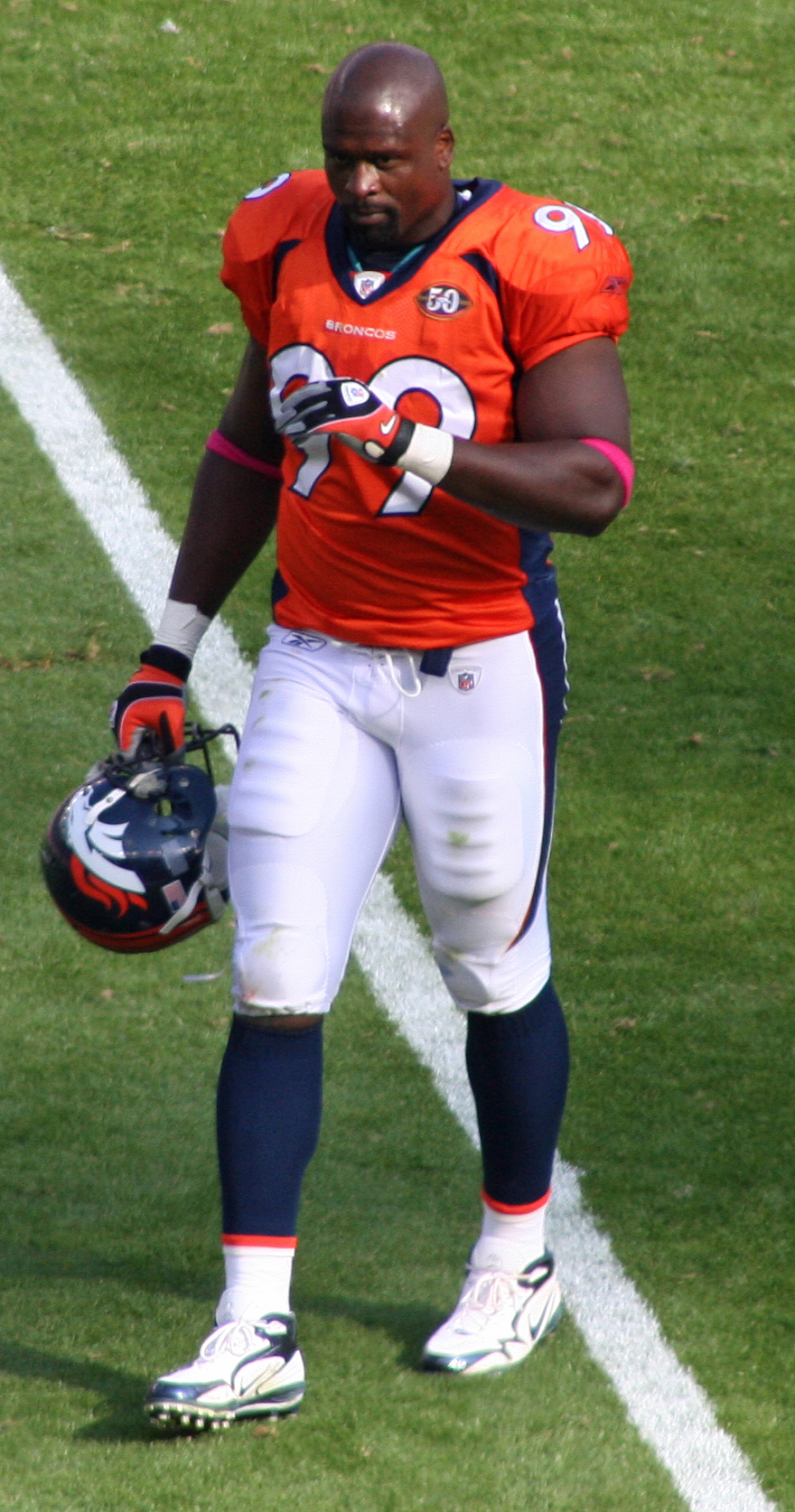
- Holliday with the Denver Broncos in 2009

No. 90, 99, 91
- Positions: Defensive end, defensive tackle

Personal information
- Born: December 11, 1975 (age 50); Camden, South Carolina, U.S.
- Listed height: 6 ft 5 in (1.96 m)
- Listed weight: 288 lb (131 kg)

Career information
- High school: Camden
- College: North Carolina
- NFL draft: 1998: 1st round, 19th overall pick

Career history
- Green Bay Packers (1998–2002); Kansas City Chiefs (2003–2004); Miami Dolphins (2005–2008); Denver Broncos (2009); Washington Redskins (2010); Arizona Cardinals (2011–2012)

Awards and highlights
- PFWA All-Rookie Team (1998); First-team All-ACC (1997)

Career NFL statistics
- Tackles: 599
- Sacks: 62.5
- Forced fumbles: 9
- Fumble recoveries: 12
- Passes defended: 37
- Interceptions: 2
- Stats at Pro Football Reference

Dimetry Giovonni Holliday (born December 11, 1975) is an American former professional football player who was a defensive end in the National Football League (NFL). He played college football for the North Carolina Tar Heels and was selected by the Green Bay Packers in the first round of the 1998 NFL draft with the 19th overall pick.

Holliday also played in the NFL for the Kansas City Chiefs, Miami Dolphins, Denver Broncos, Washington Redskins, and Arizona Cardinals.

== Early life ==
Holliday was a multi-sport star athlete at Camden High School in South Carolina. As a senior, Holliday was a first-team all-state selection and the Class 3A Lineman of the Year for his work on the gridiron. He was a three-time all-area and all-conference selection on defense, where he played defensive end, defensive tackle and linebacker. Holliday also played offense as a tight end and was an all-conference selection there as well.

In basketball, Holliday earned all-conference honors as a senior after leading his team to a record of 28-3 and the state semi-finals. He was also a three-time letterman in baseball where he played pitcher, catcher, first baseman, and third baseman.

== Professional career ==
Pre-draft measurables
Height	Weight	Arm length	Hand span
6 ft 4 3/4 in (1.95 m)	296 lb (134 kg)	35 1/2 in (0.90 m)	10 3/4 in (0.27 m)
All values from NFL Combine

=== Green Bay Packers ===
Holliday was selected in the first round with the 19th overall pick in the 1998 NFL draft by the Green Bay Packers - coincidentally with a pick acquired from Holliday's future team, the Miami Dolphins. He had an impressive rookie season, compiling 52 tackles (34 solo), a franchise rookie record 8 sacks, 2 fumble recoveries, and 5 pass deflections in 12 games. In the first round of the playoffs, Holliday recorded a sack against Pro Football Hall of Fame quarterback Steve Young of the San Francisco 49ers. For his performance in 1998, Holliday was a consensus all-rookie selection and finished second behind Oakland Raiders cornerback Charles Woodson for AP's Defensive Rookie of the Year award.

In 1999, Holliday played his first full pro season. He was once again impressive, leading all Packers linemen with 67 tackles and finishing second on the team with six sacks. He also added a forced fumble, fumble recovery and six passes defensed on the season.

Battling hamstring and ankle injuries, Holliday appeared in 12 games in 2000, starting nine. Holliday played well when he was on the field, totaling 47 tackles, five sacks, and four passes defensed. He also grabbed his first career interception in a September 10 contest against quarterback Rob Johnson and the Buffalo Bills.

Back at full health, Holliday had another good season in 2001. On the year, Holliday registered a career-high 81 tackles along with seven sacks, three fumble recoveries, a forced fumble and three passes defensed. Just as in 1999, Holliday placed first among Packers linemen in tackles and second on the team in sacks.

In his final season with the Packers, Holliday missed four games with a torn pectoral muscle and two with a knee injury. In the 10 games he did play, Holliday accumulated 26 tackles, six sacks, an interception, three forced fumbles and four passes defensed. His second career interception came in a December 15 contest against then San Francisco 49ers quarterback Jeff Garcia. Holliday posted the best game of his career on December 22 against the Buffalo Bills, in which he sacked Bills quarterback Drew Bledsoe five times and forced three fumbles - a Packers single game record. The performance against the Bills earned him NFC Defensive Player of the Week honors.

Though the Packers and Holliday discussed a contract extension prior to the 2002 season, the organization's decision to retain defensive tackle Cletidus Hunt - coupled with coach Mike Sherman being a fan of young defensive end Aaron Kampman - spelled the end of Holliday's tenure in Green Bay after the expiration of his rookie contract.

=== Kansas City Chiefs ===
As a free agent in 2003, Holliday received interest from multiple teams including the Arizona Cardinals and the Seattle Seahawks. However, it was the Kansas City Chiefs that landed him on April 7, inking him to a five-year deal worth $21.3 million and a signing bonus of $4 million. That being the case, the structure of the contract created what essentially would be a two-year deal due to a $5 million bonus owed before the third year. As things would turn out, those first two years would be the length of Holliday's tenure in Kansas City.

In Holliday's first year as a member of the Chiefs, he posted 80 tackles, 5.5 sacks, a forced fumble, and three passes defensed. He made a splash in his first game in red and gold, sacking San Diego Chargers quarterback Drew Brees three times. On a lackluster Chiefs defense, Holliday's 5.5 sacks were surprisingly best on the team.

Abdomen, groin and knee injuries limited Holliday in 2004 as he played in only nine games and started three. In the games he did play, Holliday totaled 13 tackles and two passes defensed. He was placed on injured reserve on December 24, ending his season and eventually his tenure in Kansas City.

Holliday was released by the team on February 28, 2005.

=== Miami Dolphins ===
The Miami Dolphins showed great interest in Holliday right from the start, and signed him to a contract less than two weeks after his release from the Chiefs. The two-year deal with the Dolphins included a $1 million signing bonus, minimum base salaries and over $5 million in possible incentives.

Holliday found a new home with the Dolphins at defensive tackle. Holliday's big, strong frame gave him the ability to play inside, where he displayed great ability against the run and rushing the passer. He started all 16 games as an interior defensive lineman that year, compiling 56 tackles, five sacks, two fumble recoveries and six passes defensed. Holliday's best game of the year came on November 27 against the Oakland Raiders, where he produced five tackles and two of the Dolphins' seven sacks that day.

Holliday started all 16 games for the second straight season in 2006. In one of the best seasons of his career, Holliday amassed 66 tackles, seven sacks, a fumble recovery and a pass defensed. Holliday's seven sacks in 2006 ranked second on the team behind only Defensive Player of the Year Jason Taylor's 13.5, and also ranked third in the league among defensive tackles. It was also the highest total for a Dolphins player at the position in more than two decades.

On February 21, 2007, the Dolphins re-signed Holliday to a four-year deal that would prevent the upcoming free agent from hitting the open market, where he was surely to cash in after a stellar 2006 campaign. The new deal was worth approximately $20 million, and he will make $7 million in the first year alone.

In November 2008, Holliday was selected by his teammates as the team's NFLPA player representative.

On March 2, 2009, Holliday was released by the Dolphins after failing to agree on a re-structured contract.

=== Denver Broncos ===
On September 4, 2009, Holliday signed with the Denver Broncos. Holliday recorded five sacks with the Broncos.

=== Washington Redskins ===
Holliday signed with the Washington Redskins on May 17, 2010.

=== Arizona Cardinals ===
Holliday was traded to the Arizona Cardinals along with a sixth round draft pick in exchange for running back Tim Hightower on July 31, 2011. Holliday re-signed with the Cardinals during the 2012 offseason for a fifteenth NFL season. The 2012 season would be Holliday's last with a professional team.

=== NFL statistics ===
Year	Team	Games	Combined tackles	Tackles	Assisted tackles	Sacks	Forced fumbles	Fumble recoveries
1998	GB	12	52	34	18	8.0	0	2
1999	GB	16	66	46	20	6.0	1	1
2000	GB	12	35	22	13	5.0	0	0
2001	GB	16	72	46	26	7.0	1	3
2002	GB	10	26	18	8	6.0	3	0
2003	KC	16	37	29	8	5.5	1	0
2004	KC	9	13	12	1	0.0	0	0
2005	MIA	16	51	36	15	5.0	0	2
2006	MIA	16	66	46	20	7.0	0	1
2007	MIA	12	42	33	9	2.0	1	0
2008	MIA	16	46	30	16	3.5	0	1
2009	DEN	16	33	24	9	5.0	2	1
2010	WSH	15	29	16	13	2.5	0	0
2011	ARI	16	16	14	2	0.0	0	0
2012	ARI	16	14	6	8	0.0	0	1
Career		214	598	412	186	62.5	9	12

== Personal life ==
Vonnie has a daughter, Kali, and a son, Joey. Holliday was the only boy in a household with five women, including his mother, grandmother, two sisters, and an aunt. He founded the Vonnie Holliday Foundation in 2001, which assists children's hospitals and the Camden Bulldogs football camp in South Carolina with visits and fund raising activities.
