= Scott McGarrahan =

American football player (born 1974)

No. 43, 41, 42, 44
- Position: Safety

Personal information
- Born: February 12, 1974 (age 52); Arlington, Texas, U.S.
- Listed height: 6 ft 1 in (1.85 m)
- Listed weight: 200 lb (91 kg)

Career information
- High school: Lamar (Arlington)
- College: New Mexico
- NFL draft: 1998: 6th round, 156th overall pick

Career history
- Green Bay Packers (1998–2000); Miami Dolphins (2001–2002); Green Bay Packers (2003)*; Tennessee Titans (2003–2004); San Diego Chargers (2005); Detroit Lions (2005)
- * Offseason or practice squad member only

Career NFL statistics
- Tackles: 149
- Sacks: 3
- Fumble recoveries: 2
- Interceptions: 1
- Stats at Pro Football Reference

Scott McGarrahan (born February 12, 1974) is an American former professional football player who was a safety in the National Football League (NFL) from 1998 to 2005. He played for the Green Bay Packers, Miami Dolphins, Tennessee Titans, San Diego Chargers, and Detroit Lions. He played college football for the New Mexico Lobos and was selected by the Packers in the sixth round of the 1998 NFL draft with the 156th overall pick.

== NFL career statistics ==
Legend
**Bold**	Career high

Year	Team	Games		Tackles				Interceptions				Fumbles			
Year	Team	GP	GS	Comb	Solo	Ast	Sck	Int	Yds	TD	Lng	FF	FR	Yds	TD
1998	GNB	15	0	11	8	3	0.0	0	0	0	0	0	0	0	0
1999	GNB	13	0	9	7	2	0.0	0	0	0	0	0	**1**	0	0
2000	GNB	16	0	24	19	5	0.5	0	0	0	0	0	0	0	0
2001	MIA	16	0	8	4	4	0.0	0	0	0	0	0	**1**	0	0
2002	MIA	14	0	8	3	5	**1.0**	0	0	0	0	0	0	0	0
2003	TEN	16	2	**47**	**35**	**12**	**1.0**	0	0	0	0	0	0	0	0
2004	TEN	16	1	41	32	9	0.5	**1**	**11**	0	**11**	0	0	0	0
2005	SDG	2	0	1	0	1	0.0	0	0	0	0	0	0	0	0
		108	3	149	108	41	3.0	1	11	0	11	0	2	0	0
