= Ryan Longwell =

American football player (born 1974)

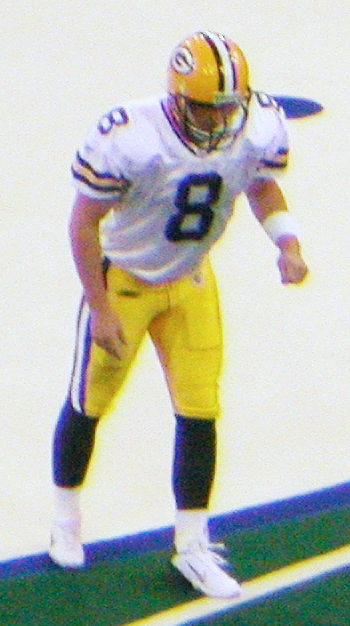
- Longwell with the Green Bay Packers in 2004

California Golden Bears
- Title: Senior analyst

Personal information
- Born: August 16, 1974 (age 52); Seattle, Washington, U.S.
- Listed height: 6 ft 0 in (1.83 m)
- Listed weight: 200 lb (91 kg)

Career information
- High school: Bend Senior (Bend, Oregon)
- College: California (1993–1996)
- NFL draft: 1997: undrafted

Career history

Playing
- San Francisco 49ers (1997)*; Green Bay Packers (1997–2005); Minnesota Vikings (2006–2011); Seattle Seahawks (2012)
- * Offseason or practice squad member only

Coaching
- California (2023–present) Senior analyst

Awards and highlights
- Green Bay Packers Hall of Fame; Minnesota Vikings All-Mall of America Field Team; First-team All-Pac-10 (1996); Second-team All-Pac-10 (1995)

Career NFL statistics
- Field goals made: 361
- Field goals attempted: 434
- Field goal %: 83.2
- Longest field goal: 55
- Points scored: 1,687
- Stats at Pro Football Reference

Ryan Walker Longwell (born August 16, 1974) is an American former professional football player who was a placekicker in the National Football League (NFL). After playing college football for the California Golden Bears, he started his professional career with the San Francisco 49ers, but never played a game for the franchise. He then played for the Green Bay Packers from 1997 to 2005. He played for the Minnesota Vikings from 2006 to 2011. He also played briefly for the Seattle Seahawks during the 2012 playoffs.

== Early life ==
Longwell attended high school in Bend, Oregon, where he played high school football for Bend High School's Lava Bears. A three-year letter winner in football as a kicker, Longwell also was the team's backup quarterback. He also played baseball as a third baseman, earning three letters in that sport. He earned all-conference honors in both sports.

In 1993, he started college at the University of California, Berkeley where he played football and earned four varsity letters. At California he served as both a punter and placekicker for the team, earning all-conference honors in the Pac-10 his senior year as a punter and second team honors as a kicker. Longwell graduated with a Bachelor of Arts degree in English.

== Professional football ==
=== Green Bay Packers ===
Longwell was acquired by the Green Bay Packers off waivers from the San Francisco 49ers in 1997. With the Packers, Longwell played in Super Bowl XXXII, where he kicked one field goal and three extra points in their 31–24 loss to the Denver Broncos. He spent his first 9 seasons playing for the Packers, and scored over 120 points during 6 of those seasons. By the end of his 7th season in Green Bay, Longwell had passed Hall of Famer Don Hutson to become the Packers all-time leading scorer. And while Mason Crosby has since passed him, Longwell remains second on Green Bay's all-time scoring list.

=== Minnesota Vikings ===
Longwell signed a free agent contract with the Vikings in the 2006 offseason. In his second game with the Minnesota Vikings, Longwell had one of the best performances of his career. He was responsible for all 16 of the Vikings points in a 16–13 win over the Carolina Panthers, kicking three field goals (including the game-winning field goal in overtime) and throwing a 16-yard touchdown pass on a fake field goal play in the fourth quarter. In the 2008 season finale against the New York Giants, he kicked a 50-yard field goal as time expired to help the Vikings clinch the division in a 20–19 victory.

During the 2010 offseason, Longwell, a close friend of Brett Favre, became a sort of unofficial spokesman for Favre, as the media frequently questioned him on whether Favre would return to the Vikings or retire. When Longwell picked Favre up at the airport in Minnesota on August 17, 2010, TV station helicopters followed Longwell's SUV all the way to Vikings headquarters. In 2018, he was inducted into the Green Bay Packers Hall of Fame.

=== Seattle Seahawks and retirement ===
On January 8, 2013, Longwell was signed by the Seattle Seahawks after Steven Hauschka suffered a calf injury. He kicked four extra points (with no field goal attempts) in the Divisional Round loss to Atlanta. On August 12, 2013, the Green Bay Packers announced that Longwell would retire as a Packer.

== Career regular season statistics ==
Career high/best bolded

Regular season statistics
Season	Team (record)	G	FGM	FGA	%	<20	20-29	30-39	40-49	50+	LNG	BLK	XPM	XPA	%	PTS
1997	GB (13–3)	16	24	30	80.0	**4–4**	7–8	10–13	2–4	1–1	50	2	48	48	**100.0**	120
1998	GB (11–5)	16	29	33	87.9	1–1	6–6	**13–15**	9–10	0–1	45	0	41	43	95.3	128
1999	GB (8–8)	16	25	30	83.3	0–0	8–9	8–9	8–10	1–2	50	**3**	38	38	**100.0**	113
2000	GB (9–7)	16	**33**	**38**	86.8	0–0	7–8	10–10	**13–15**	3–5	52	1	32	32	**100.0**	131
2001	GB (9–7)	16	20	31	64.5	0–0	3–4	9–10	7–14	1–3	54	2	44	45	97.8	104
2002	GB (12–4)	16	28	34	82.4	1–1	8–9	12–13	7–10	0–1	49	1	44	44	**100.0**	128
2003	GB (10–6)	16	23	26	88.5	0–0	5–5	11–11	6–9	1–1	50	0	51	51	**100.0**	120
2004	GB (10–6)	16	24	28	85.7	0–0	8–8	8–9	6–8	2–3	53	0	48	48	**100.0**	120
2005	GB (4–12)	16	20	27	74.1	0–0	7–7	6–10	3–5	4–5	53	1	30	31	96.8	90
2006	MIN (6–10)	16	21	25	84.0	2–2	7–7	8–8	4–6	0–2	49	2	27	28	96.4	90
2007	MIN (8–8)	16	20	24	83.3	0–0	3–3	6–6	10–11	1–4	**55**	1	39	40	96.9	99
2008	MIN (10–6)	16	29	34	85.3	0–0	**10–10**	7–9	6–9	**6–6**	54	2	40	40	**100.0**	127
2009	MIN (12–4)	16	26	28	92.9	1–1	**10–10**	5–6	8–9	2–2	52	2	**54**	**55**	98.2	**132**
2010	MIN (6–10)	16	17	18	**94.4**	0–0	7–7	8–9	2–2	0–0	48	1	30	31	96.8	81
2011	MIN (3–13)	16	22	28	78.6	0–0	7–7	7–8	6–10	2–3	53	1	38	39	97.4	104
Career (15 seasons)		240	361	434	83.2	9–9	103–108	128–146	97–132	24–39	55	19	604	613	98.5	1687

== Personal life ==
Longwell is the cousin of 1992 and 1996 Olympic athlete Michael Orr. He is married to Sarah Longwell, and they have two children, Shaye and Reece. Shaye played college tennis at LSU and Reece graduated from Georgia Tech.

In 2023, Longwell joined his alma mater, California, under head coach Justin Wilcox as a senior analyst.

== See also ==
- List of most consecutive starts and games played by National Football League players
