= Basil Mitchell (American football) =

American football player (born 1975)

No. 28, 36
- Position: Running back

Personal information
- Born: September 7, 1975 (age 51); Pittsburg, Texas
- Listed height: 5 ft 10 in (1.78 m)
- Listed weight: 207 lb (94 kg)

Career information
- High school: Mount Pleasant (TX)
- College: TCU
- NFL draft: 1999: undrafted

Career history
- Green Bay Packers (1999–2000); Denver Broncos (2001)*
- * Offseason or practice squad member only
- Stats at Pro Football Reference

Basil Mucktar Mitchell (born September 7, 1975) is a former National Football League running back. He played for two seasons with the Green Bay Packers.

== College career ==
A 4-year letterman at Mount Pleasant High School, Basil Mitchell ran for over 1,650 yards and 30 touchdowns during his senior campaign. This performance warranted recognition from several division I universities. He enrolled at TCU in 1994 and in two years was already their #1 running back. Basil is one of only 9 Horned Frogs to eclipse the 2,500 yard mark. He finished out his days as a Horned Frog with 2,783 yards which puts him at #6 all time. He had 12 career 100 yard rushing games, and is one of three Horned Frogs to have multiple 200 yard games, which came against UNLV in 1996 (220 yards) and Tulsa, also in '96 (215 yards). The two other members of the multiple 200 yard club are LaDainian Tomlinson with 8 and Kenneth Davis with 3.

During Mitchell's senior season at TCU, the Horned Frogs' feature running back helped the team earn a trip to the 1998 Sun Bowl in El Paso, Texas in a matchup against Carson Palmer and the highly touted USC Trojans. Mitchell led the 'Frogs with 185 yards and 2 touchdowns earning honors as the 1998 Norwest Sun Bowl MVP and his effort helped to give TCU their first bowl game victory since 1957, beating USC 28-19. Mitchell finished the season with 1,100 yards rushing, and led the country in yards per carry with a 6.7 average.

== Professional career ==
The 5'-10", 200 pound Mitchell was acquired by the Packers as a free agent on April 19, 1999. He played in 1999 and 2000. He played in 16 games in 1999. He had 29 rush attempts for 117 yards. That makes for an average of 4 yards per rush attempt. He also had six receptions for 48 yards. Next season, Mitchell only played one game and had two rush attempts for eight yards.

During the final game of the 1999 NFL season, Mitchell and the Packers were involved in what has been described as a bizarre tie-breaking scenario which resulted in four teams that finished with 8–8 records where two of the teams would qualify for the playoffs and the other two would be eliminated. Going into their season finale against the Arizona Cardinals, the Packers needed to win their game, have the Dallas Cowboys lose their game later that afternoon, and also needed the Packers to win the net points scored tie-breaker vs. the Carolina Panthers (who were facing the New Orleans Saints). The Packers and Panthers were playing during the noon time slot and the Packers held a net eighteen point advantage. As the game progressed, Carolina was winning their game by a sizable margin to the point that they had overtaken the Packers in net points for a brief time. Since both teams were neck and neck for the tie-break advantage, both teams were frantically trying to score as many points as possible despite leading on the scoreboard by a sizable margin. The Cardinals and Saints also tried to score frantically as the game progressed to stop their opponents from gaining the net points advantage. Ultimately, the Packers prevailed in net points by +11. In the end however, the Cowboys won their afternoon contest against the New York Giants to claim the final playoff spot and thus eliminate the Packers from playoff contention. Mitchell scored a key touchdown in the contest on an 88-yard kickoff return for a touchdown. The Packers won their game 49–24 and the Panthers won their game 45–13.

In 2000, Mitchell was drafted for the single season XFL by the Memphis Maniax, but never played in the league.

As of 2009, Mitchell resides in Mount Pleasant, Texas. He and his wife Sharay have a total of five children.
