= Ahman Green =

American gridiron football player (born 1977)

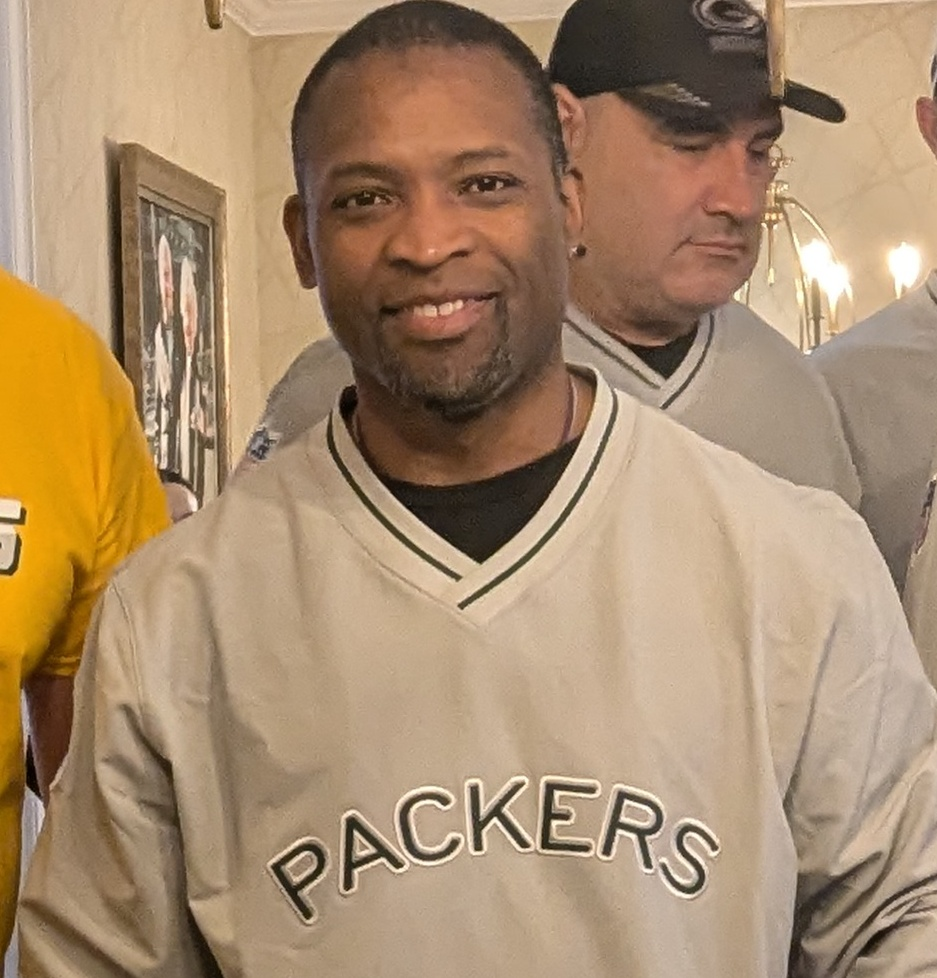
- Green in 2025

No. 30, 34
- Position: Running back

Personal information
- Born: February 16, 1977 (age 49); Omaha, Nebraska, U.S.
- Listed height: 6 ft 0 in (1.83 m)
- Listed weight: 218 lb (99 kg)

Career information
- High school: Omaha Central
- College: Nebraska (1995–1997)
- NFL draft: 1998: 3rd round, 76th overall pick

Career history

Playing
- Seattle Seahawks (1998–1999); Green Bay Packers (2000–2006); Houston Texans (2007–2008); Green Bay Packers (2009); Omaha Nighthawks (2010); Montreal Alouettes (2011)*
- * Offseason or practice squad member only

Operations
- Green Bay Blizzard (2012–2014) (co-owner)

Awards and highlights
- Second-team All-Pro (2001); 4× Pro Bowl (2001–2004); Green Bay Packers Hall of Fame; 2× Bowl Alliance national champion (1995, 1997); Second-team All-American (1997); First-team All-Big 12 (1997); First-team All-Big Eight (1995)

Career NFL statistics
- Rushing yards: 9,205
- Rushing average: 4.5
- Rushing touchdowns: 60
- Receptions: 378
- Receiving yards: 2,883
- Receiving touchdowns: 14
- Stats at Pro Football Reference
- Stats at CFL.ca (archive)

Ahman Rashad Green (/ɑːˈmɑːn/; born February 16, 1977) is an American former professional football running back who played 12 seasons in the National Football League (NFL). He played college football for the Nebraska Cornhuskers, earning second-team All-American honors in 1997. Green was selected by the Seattle Seahawks in the third round of the 1998 NFL draft, playing there for two seasons before being traded to the Green Bay Packers, with whom he played for eight of the next ten seasons. Green also played for the Houston Texans, and was a four-time Pro Bowl selection with the Packers, where he holds the franchise record for rushing yards. He was the head esports coach at Lakeland University until the end of 2022.

== Early life ==
Green was born in Omaha, Nebraska, and attended Omaha North before transferring to Omaha Central for high school. He was a high school All-American selection and state 'Player of the Year' as a senior.

In addition to football, he also ran track and field. He currently holds the 10th fastest 100 meter dash ever in the state of Nebraska, at 10.61 seconds.

Green also competed in powerlifting in high school, placing 2nd in the ADFPA High School National Powerlifting Championships in Des Moines, Iowa.

== College career ==
Green was a standout running back and three-year starter at the University of Nebraska–Lincoln. He was an integral component and key contributor on two national championship squads for the Cornhuskers.

=== Freshman (1995) ===
As a freshman, Green was perhaps overshadowed by his backfield mates running back Lawrence Phillips and quarterback Tommie Frazier. He was a major contributor during Nebraska's 1995 championship run. He rushed for 1,086 yards (still the school's single-season freshman rushing record) and 13 touchdowns on 141 carries (7.7 avg.) and was honored as a freshman All-America selection by Football News. In addition, he earned Big Eight all-conference and 'Freshman of the Year' honors.

=== Sophomore (1996) ===
As a sophomore in 1996, Green compiled a team-leading 917 yards on 155 carries and seven touchdowns, despite a turf toe injury. Green had a career-high 214 yards against Iowa State University that season.

=== Junior (1997) ===
As a junior, Green garnered All-Big 12 Conference recognition and was named second-team All-America by the Associated Press and The Sporting News as Nebraska again captured the national championship. He was a finalist for the Doak Walker Award, the annual honor for college football's top running back, in 1997. During that campaign he carried the ball 278 times for 1,877 yards (6.8 avg.) and 22 touchdowns (a school record for juniors). He posted 12 consecutive 100-yard games, including three contests with over 200 yards (he also had 99 yards on nine carries in the opener against Akron).

During his collegiate career, Green compiled 3,880 rushing yards and 42 touchdowns, both totals good for second place on the Cornhuskers' all-time list. He also posted 300 receiving yards and three touchdowns on 35 catches. One of Green's best collegiate performances came on January 2, 1998, in the Orange Bowl. He rushed for an Orange Bowl record 206 yards and two touchdowns in Nebraska's 42–17 victory over #3 Tennessee, breaking the previous 20-year-old record of 205 yards held by Arkansas running back Roland Sales. Green was also named the 1998 Orange Bowl MVP. The performance marked the Cornhuskers' record-setting third national championship in four years.

Green played in a bowl game each season he was at Nebraska. In the 1996 Fiesta Bowl, he rushed for 68 yards and one touchdown. In the 1996 Orange Bowl (played at the end of the year), he rushed for 52 yards, and in the 1998 Orange Bowl, he rushed for 206 yards and two touchdowns.

== Professional career ==
Pre-draft measurables
Height	Weight	Arm length	Hand span	40-yard dash	10-yard split	20-yard split	Vertical jump	Broad jump	Bench press
5 ft 11 3/4 in (1.82 m)	213 lb (97 kg)	31 1/4 in (0.79 m)	9 1/2 in (0.24 m)	4.44 s	1.53 s	2.58 s	38.5 in (0.98 m)	10 ft 9 in (3.28 m)	13 reps
All values from NFL Combine

=== Seattle Seahawks (1998–1999) ===
Green was drafted in the third round (76th overall) of the 1998 NFL draft by the Seattle Seahawks. Although Green produced a high rushing average (6.0 in 1998 and 4.6 in 1999) he had difficulty earning significant playing time behind established veteran Ricky Watters.

=== Green Bay Packers (2000–2006) ===
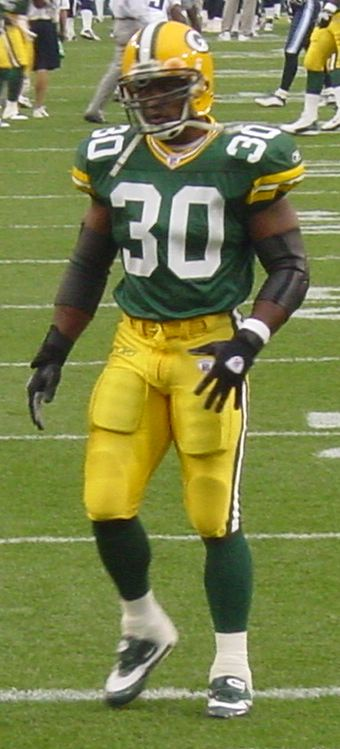
Green with the Green Bay Packers in 2003

In 2000, Green was traded along with a fifth round draft pick to the Green Bay Packers for Fred Vinson and a sixth round pick. He was selected to the NFL Pro Bowl from 2001 to 2004 and broke several franchise records. From the time he joined the Packers in 2000 up through the end of the 2004 season, Green gained more yards from scrimmage (9,036) and rushing yards (6,848) than any other NFL player. Green's highest rushing touchdown per game total came in 2002, when he scored three in a 30–9 win versus the then-Washington Redskins. In 2003, he had his best year as a professional and set the Green Bay franchise record by running for 1,883 yards in the regular season, and three of his highest rushing yardage games came that season (218, 192, 176). That year, he became the first and only player in NFL history to record at least 1,850 rushing yards, average 5.0 yards per carry, score 20 touchdowns and catch 50 passes in one season. He threw a touchdown pass on October 17, 2004 vs. the Detroit Lions. During his time with the Packers, Green became one of two players in NFL history to have two touchdown runs of 90 or more yards (Bo Jackson is the other). Despite his injury-shortened 2005 season, the Packers re-signed Green to a one-year, $2 million contract, with an extra $3 million in incentives. After the 2006 season he became a free agent. He signed a one-year deal to remain with the Packers.

=== Houston Texans (2007–2008) ===
On March 4, 2007, Green signed a four-year, $23 million deal with the Houston Texans. He was reunited with his former head coach and former Texans' assistant head coach Mike Sherman along with former Packers running back Samkon Gado. He was asked to handle the bulk of the load at running back after a 2006 season in which the Texans used a "running back by committee" approach. Across his two seasons with the Texans, Green rushed 144 times for 554 yards and two touchdowns and also caught 25 passes for 155 yards.

On February 10, 2009, Green was released by the Texans.

=== Return to the Green Bay Packers (2009) ===
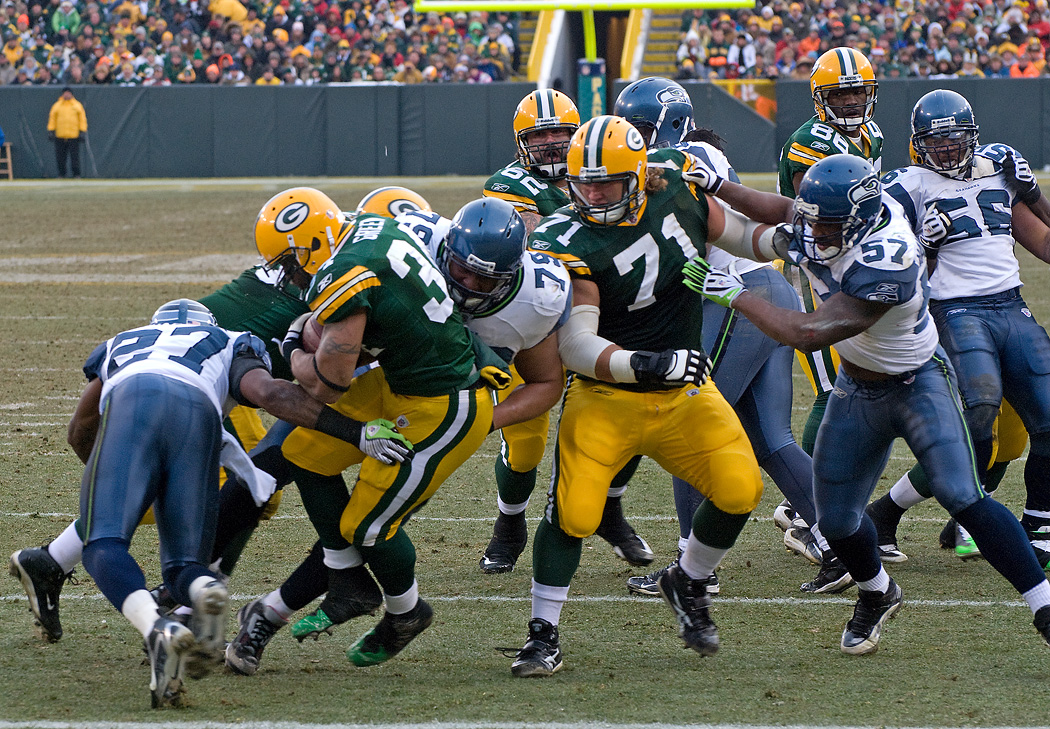
Ahman Green runs in for a touchdown against Seattle on December 27, 2009.

Ahman Green officially re-signed with the Green Bay Packers on October 21, 2009, after the Packers placed running back DeShawn Wynn on injured reserve. With his former number, 30, taken by fullback John Kuhn, Green wore No. 34, the same number as former Chicago Bears running back Walter Payton, whom Green idolized as a young player. On November 8, 2009, Green broke Jim Taylor's record to become the all-time leading rusher in Packer history. In his final NFL season, Green was primarily used in a reserve role, rushing 41 times for 160 yards and one touchdown and also catching 3 passes for 18 yards.

=== Omaha Nighthawks (2010) ===
Green joined the Omaha Nighthawks of the United Football League for the 2010 season. He was a part of the Nighthawks' 40-man protected roster, started 8 games for the Nighthawks.

=== Montreal Alouettes (2011) ===
On February 7, 2011, the Montreal Alouettes of the Canadian Football League announced they signed Green to a tryout contract, signing Green to an official contract in March of that year. Green was released on Sunday of training camp on June 5, 2011, after arriving with an injured hamstring.

=== Retirement ===
Green announced his retirement from football in August 2011.

== Career statistics ==
=== NFL ===
Rushing statistics

Year	Team	GP	Att	Yards	Avg	Lng	TD	FD	Fum	Lost
1998	SEA	16	35	209	6.0	64	1	8	1	1
1999	SEA	14	26	120	4.6	21	0	12	0	0
2000	GB	16	263	1,175	4.5	39	10	61	3	2
2001	GB	16	304	1,387	4.6	83T	9	57	5	4
2002	GB	14	286	1,240	4.3	43	7	54	3	2
2003	GB	16	355	1,883	5.3	98T	15	96	7	5
2004	GB	15	259	1,163	4.5	90T	7	55	6	4
2005	GB	5	77	255	3.3	13	0	11	1	0
2006	GB	14	266	1,059	4.0	70T	5	55	2	2
2007	HOU	6	70	260	3.7	18	2	17	0	0
2008	HOU	8	74	294	4.0	14	3	23	0	0
2009	GB	8	41	160	3.9	26	1	8	0	0
Career		148	2,056	9,205	4.5	98	60	457	28	20

Receiving statistics

Year	Team	GP	Rec	Yards	Avg	Lng	TD	FD	Fum	Lost
1998	SEA	16	3	2	0.7	3	0	0	0	0
2000	GB	16	73	559	7.7	31	3	29	3	2
2001	GB	16	62	594	9.6	42	2	24	0	0
2002	GB	14	57	393	6.9	23	2	19	1	1
2003	GB	16	50	367	7.3	27	5	19	0	0
2004	GB	15	40	275	6.9	48	1	17	1	0
2005	GB	5	19	147	7.7	20	0	8	0	0
2006	GB	14	46	373	8.1	20	1	14	2	0
2007	HOU	6	14	123	8.8	53	0	2	0	0
2008	HOU	8	11	32	2.9	8	0	0	0	0
2009	GB	8	3	18	6.0	12	0	2	0	0
Career		148	378	2,883	7.6	53	14	134	7	3

=== College ===
Year	School	G	Rush Att	Rush Yds	Rush Avg	Rush TD	Rec	Rec Yds	Rec Avg	Rec TD	Scri Plays	Scri Yds	Scri Avg	Scri TD
1995	Nebraska	11	141	1086	7.7	13	12	102	8.5	3	153	1188	7.8	16
1996	Nebraska	10	155	917	5.9	7	9	93	10.3	0	164	1010	6.2	7
1997	Nebraska	12	278	1877	6.8	22	14	105	7.5	0	292	1982	6.8	22
College Totals			574	3880	6.8	42	35	300	8.6	3	609	4180	6.9	45

Provided by CFB at Sports Reference: View Original Table Generated June 27, 2017.

== Career highlights ==
=== Awards and honors ===
NFL

- 4× Pro Bowl, 2001–2004
- NFC Offensive Player of the Year, 2003
- FedEx Ground Player of the Year (2003)
- Green Bay Packers Hall of Fame inductee

College

- 2× Bowl Alliance national championships, 1995, 1997
- 2nd Team All-American, 1997
- Honorable Mention All-American, 1995
- 1998 Orange Bowl MVP
- Big 8 Offensive Freshman of the Year, 1995
- Doak Walker Award finalist, 1997
- First-team All-Big 12, 1997
- First-team All-Big 8, 1995 Coaches Poll
- Second-team All-Big 8, 1995 AP Poll
- Third-team All-Big 12, 1996

High school

- Gatorade Circle of Champions Nebraska Player of the Year (1995)
- Offensive Player of the Year (1994, Lincoln Journal Star)
- Nebraska Male High School Athlete of the Year (1994–95, Omaha World-Herald)
- 2× First-team All-Nebraska (Omaha World-Herald)
- 2× First-team Super-State (Lincoln Journal Star)
- Parade All-American
- USA Today First-team All-American
- Bluechip Illustrated Dream Team, also Bluechip's top running prospect
- Reebok, Schutt High School, SuperPrep All-American

=== Green Bay Packers franchise records ===
- Most rushing yards, career: 8,322
- Most rushing yards at Lambeau Field, career: 4,507
- Most rushing yards at Lambeau Field, game: 218, vs. Denver Broncos, December 28, 2003
- Longest run from scrimmage at Lambeau Field, game: 98, vs. Denver Broncos, December 28, 2003
- Most rushing yards in a season: 1,883, 2003

== Personal life ==
Green was named after former NFL wide receiver and current broadcaster Ahmad Rashad. He has an uncle, Michael Green, who also attended Nebraska as a running back in the late 1960s. His uncle was drafted by the San Diego Chargers, but never appeared in a game.

In 2003, Green completed his undergraduate degree at Nebraska after taking classes at the University of Wisconsin–Green Bay, receiving a bachelor's degree in geography.

On September 21, 2012, Green was inducted into the University Of Nebraska Football Hall of Fame and was inducted into the Green Bay Packers Football Hall of Fame on July 19, 2014.

Green has lived in Green Bay since his retirement, and is an avid video-gamer and comic book fan – so much so that his nickname is "Batman", illustrated further by a calf tattoo of the superhero. He operates a sports training facility in the city, and serves as a spokesman for the Wisconsin Alzheimer's Association. From 2012 to 2014, Green served as co-owner of the Green Bay Blizzard, an arena football team.

In 2006, Green played a small role in the film Big Stan as the prisoner Lee Otis. Green also had a small role in Batman v Superman: Dawn of Justice as an unnamed thug, but his scene was cut from the final version of the film.

On June 26, 2017, Green was arrested on charges of child abuse and disorderly conduct after his daughter (from a previous marriage) claimed Green pushed her and struck her in the head over a dispute about chores. Green eventually entered a plea bargain where he pled no contest to reduced charges of criminal damage to property and disorderly conduct, claiming that he did not want to subject his daughter to a jury trial. He received 18 months probation.

In February 2020, Green was named head coach of Lakeland University's new varsity esports team.

In November 2021, Green hosted the finals of the first ever Mid-America Gamers Expo in Council Bluffs.

Green was announced as a professor in the University of Nebraska–Lincoln's College of Journalism and Mass Communications in 2023.

On July 29, 2026, Green announced that he was diagnosed with early-onset Parkinson's disease.
