= Rodney Artmore =

American football player (born 1974)

No. 46
- Position: Defensive back

Personal information
- Born: June 14, 1974 (age 52); Galveston, Texas, U.S.
- Listed height: 6 ft 0 in (1.83 m)
- Listed weight: 210 lb (95 kg)

Career information
- High school: Ball (Texas)
- College: Garden City CC (1994–1995); Baylor (1996–1997)

Career history
- Green Bay Packers (1998–1999)

Career statistics
- Games played: 5
- Stats at Pro Football Reference

Rodney Dwayne Artmore (born June 14, 1974) is an American former professional football player. A defensive back, he played college football for the Garden City Broncbusters and Baylor Bears. After college, he was signed by the Green Bay Packers as an undrafted free agent in 1998. He played for them in five games as a backup in 1999 before being released in 2000.

== Early life ==
Artmore was born on June 14, 1974, in Galveston, Texas. He attended Ball High School in Galveston where he played football and basketball. In 1991, he played at wide receiver and safety before focusing just on defense as a senior in 1992, as well as serving as long snapper. In his last year, he was named 5A all-state after recording nine interceptions, all of which occurred in the first six games. After high school, Artmore decided to play college football for the Garden City Broncbusters.

== College career ==
Artmore played for Garden City from 1994 to 1995. As a freshman while playing safety, he totaled 78 tackles and four interceptions. He then was named a first-team NJCAA All-American and the Region VI player of the year in 1995, after recording 101 tackles, four interceptions, nine pass breakups and three forced fumbles while helping the Broncbusters rank sixth nationally. Artmore helped Garden City win the 1995 Valley of the Sun Bowl. He transferred to the Baylor Bears for the 1996 season, where he joined his high school teammate George McCullough. He was a starter in 1996, finishing as Baylor's second-leading tackler, but then was academically ineligible as a senior in 1997. Head coach Dave Roberts said he removed Artmore from the team as "It's academics, but it's also some other things that I would rather not mention".

== Professional career ==
Artmore was granted special eligibility for the 1998 NFL draft, but went unselected. On December 31, 1998, he signed with the Green Bay Packers to the practice squad as an undrafted free agent. He re-signed for the 1999 season and made the team, making his NFL debut in Week 1 against the Oakland Raiders. He then was inactive until Week 12, when he posted his first career tackle against the San Francisco 49ers. He appeared in three additional games but was placed on injured reserve on December 20; he finished the season with seven tackles, including six solo and one assist, while being used as a reserve. He was released by the Packers on February 12, 2000, following charges of marijuana possession.
