= Vaughn Booker =

American football player (born 1968)

No. 99, 96
- Position: Defensive end

Personal information
- Born: February 24, 1968 (age 58); Cincinnati, Ohio, U.S.
- Listed height: 6 ft 5 in (1.96 m)
- Listed weight: 300 lb (136 kg)

Career information
- High school: Robert A. Taft (Cincinnati)
- College: Cincinnati
- NFL draft: 1992: undrafted

Career history
- Winnipeg Blue Bombers (1992–1993); Indianapolis Colts (1994)*; Kansas City Chiefs (1994–1997); Green Bay Packers (1998–1999); Cincinnati Bengals (2000–2002)
- * Offseason or practice squad member only

Career NFL statistics
- Tackles: 241
- Sacks: 14.5
- Fumble recoveries: 5
- Stats at Pro Football Reference

Vaughn Jamel Booker (born February 24, 1968) is an American former professional football player who was a defensive end for nine years in the National Football League (NFL). He played college football for the Cincinnati Bearcats before beginning his pro career playing two seasons for the Winnipeg Blue Bombers of the Canadian Football League (CFL).
