= Anthony Davis (linebacker) =

American football player (born 1969)

No. 50, 56
- Position: Linebacker

Personal information
- Born: March 17, 1969 (age 57); Kennewick, Washington, U.S.
- Listed height: 6 ft 0 in (1.83 m)
- Listed weight: 235 lb (107 kg)

Career information
- High school: Pasco (Pasco, Washington)
- College: Utah
- NFL draft: 1992: 11th round, 301st overall pick

Career history

Playing
- Houston Oilers (1992)*; Seattle Seahawks (1992–1993); Kansas City Chiefs (1994–1998); Green Bay Packers (1999); Baltimore Ravens (2000)
- * Offseason or practice squad member only

Coaching
- MidAmerica Nazarene (2008–2010) Linebackers coach

Awards and highlights
- Super Bowl champion (XXXV); First-team All-WAC (1990)

Career NFL statistics
- Tackles: 332
- Sacks: 12.5
- Interceptions: 5
- Stats at Pro Football Reference

Anthony Darvise Davis (born March 7, 1969) is an American former professional football player who was a linebacker in the National Football League (NFL) who played from 1993 to 2000. He was selected 301st overall by the Houston Oilers in the 11th round of the 1992 NFL draft. He played college football for the Utah Utes. In 2008, Anthony joined the coaching staff at MidAmerica Nazarene University in Olathe, Kansas to coach the linebackers.
