= Fred Vinson (American football) =

American football player (born 1977)

No. 31
- Position: Cornerback

Personal information
- Born: April 2, 1977 (age 49); North Augusta, South Carolina, U.S.
- Listed height: 5 ft 11 in (1.80 m)
- Listed weight: 180 lb (82 kg)

Career information
- High school: North Augusta
- College: Vanderbilt
- NFL draft: 1999: 2nd round, 47th overall pick

Career history
- Green Bay Packers (1999); Seattle Seahawks (2000); Carolina Panthers (2002)*; Carolina Cobras (2004)
- * Offseason or practice squad member only
- Stats at Pro Football Reference
- Stats at ArenaFan.com

Fred Vinson (born April 2, 1977) is an American former professional football player who was a cornerback in the National Football League (NFL). He played college football for the Vanderbilt Commodores.

He is the cousin of NFL safety Corey Chavous and is also related to Barney Chavous, former defensive end/defensive tackle for the Denver Broncos.

== Early life and college ==
When he was ten years old, Vinson competed in the Utah Junior Olympics, where his 40-yard dash time was 2/100ths behind the national best. He attended North Augusta High School, where he was an All-Area and All-Conference selection after recording ninety-nine tackles as a senior. He attended Vanderbilt University, where he played every game as a freshman, starting one and garnering thirty tackles. The following season, he won a full-time starting job and had a career-high fifty-three tackles, thirty-nine of them solo. In 1997, his total increased to forty-eight tackles, with forty-four of them solo. He began his senior season as the starter for Vanderbilt, but was injured in an early contest, forcing him to miss the rest of the season.

== Professional career ==
Despite the injury, Vinson was selected in the second round with the 47th overall selection in the 1999 NFL draft by the Green Bay Packers. He played as a nickelback and had nineteen tackles and two interceptions. After one season with the Packers, he was traded to the Seattle Seahawks for running back Ahman Green and a fifth-round draft pick. Vinson suffered a torn ACL during the preseason in a pickup basketball game and was forced to miss the season. After another injury the following offseason, he was released. He attempted a comeback with the Carolina Panthers, but did not a play a game.

He played in the Arena Football League with the Carolina Cobras. He had eighteen tackles, but did not play in the league again following the folding of the Cobras.

=== Career statistics ===
Season	Team	Games		Tackles				
Season	Team	GP	GS	Total	Solo	Ast	Sck	Int
1999	Green Bay Packers	16	1	14.0	9.0	5.0	1.0	2
	Total	16	1	14.0	9.0	5.0	1.0	2

== Post-football career ==
Fred Vinson is the founder of WebID and LocalOrganicRankings.com.
