= Matt Snider =

American football player (born 1976)

No. 38, 44
- Position: Fullback

Personal information
- Born: January 26, 1976; Des Moines, Iowa. U.S.
- Died: October 9, 2023 (aged 47); San Diego, California, U.S.
- Listed height: 6 ft 2 in (1.88 m)
- Listed weight: 241 lb (109 kg)

Career information
- High school: Lower Merion (PA)
- College: Richmond
- NFL draft: 1999: undrafted

Career history
- Carolina Panthers (1999)*; Green Bay Packers (1999–2000); Minnesota Vikings (2001); Houston Texans (2001–2002)*
- * Offseason or practice squad member only
- Stats at Pro Football Reference

Matthew Kale Snider (January 26, 1976 – October 9, 2023) was an American football fullback. He graduated from the University of Richmond in 1999 with a Bachelor of Arts in Sports Science and Health. The Carolina Panthers offered him an NFL free agent contract in April 1999, but he was waived from the Charlotte-based team in June.

The Green Bay Packers then offered him a two-year contract in July 1999, and Snider made the roster as the back-up fullback and special teams performer after coming into camp as the fourth-string fullback. One highlight of his career at Green Bay was a preseason 66-yard touchdown reception at Lambeau Field.

He played two seasons for Green Bay, who released him at the start of the 2001 season. The Minnesota Vikings picked him up soon after. Snider played four games with the Vikings before they released him, and for the rest of the 2001 season he was not on a roster. The newly formed Houston Texans signed Snider as a free agent in December 2001, making him one of the first ten players the franchise ever signed. The Texans released Snider after training camp in August 2002, ending his NFL career.

Snider graduated from Lower Merion High School in Ardmore, Pennsylvania, a suburb outside of Philadelphia, in 1994. He played football and basketball for the Lower Merion Aces, and he played two years of high school basketball with Kobe Bryant. In 1994, Snider's senior season and Bryant's sophomore season, he and Bryant were named team MVPs for the season. Snider was also named to the first-team all Philadelphia Main Line roster.

== Personal life ==
Snider died in San Diego on October 9, 2023, at the age of 47.
