= Tod McBride =

American football player (born 1976)

No. 27
- Position: Cornerback

Personal information
- Born: January 26, 1976 (age 50); Los Angeles, California, U.S.
- Listed height: 6 ft 1 in (1.85 m)
- Listed weight: 208 lb (94 kg)

Career information
- High school: Walnut (Walnut, California)
- College: UCLA
- NFL draft: 1999: undrafted

Career history
- Seattle Seahawks (1999)*; Green Bay Packers (1999–2002); Atlanta Falcons (2003); Seattle Seahawks (2004); St. Louis Rams (2004)
- * Offseason or practice squad member only

Career NFL statistics
- Tackles: 188
- Interceptions: 6
- Sacks: 2
- Stats at Pro Football Reference

Tod McBride (born January 26, 1976, in Los Angeles, California) is an American former professional football player who was a cornerback in the National Football League. He played college football for the UCLA Bruins and was signed by the Green Bay Packers as an undrafted free agent in 1999. McBride also played for the Atlanta Falcons, Seattle Seahawks, and St. Louis Rams.
