= Cletidus Hunt =

American football player (born 1976)

No. 97
- Position: Defensive tackle

Personal information
- Born: January 2, 1976 (age 50); Memphis, Tennessee, U.S.
- Listed height: 6 ft 4 in (1.93 m)
- Listed weight: 305 lb (138 kg)

Career information
- High school: Whitehaven (Memphis)
- College: Kentucky State
- NFL draft: 1999: 3rd round, 94th overall pick

Career history
- Green Bay Packers (1999–2004); New York Dragons (2007)

Career NFL statistics
- Tackles: 128
- Sacks: 17
- Forced fumbles: 3
- Stats at Pro Football Reference

Cletidus Marquell Hunt (born January 2, 1976) is an American former professional football player who was a defensive tackle in the National Football League (NFL) and Arena Football League (AFL).

== Early life ==
Hunt was born in Memphis, Tennessee, and played college football for Kentucky State University.

== Professional career ==
Hunt was selected in the third round with the 94th overall pick by the Green Bay Packers in the 1999 NFL draft. In his NFL career, he has amassed 119 tackles, 17 sacks, and played in 85 games.

Hunt signed with the New York Dragons of the Arena Football League on May 23, 2007. On November 2, 2007, Hunt was waived by the Dragons.

In 2020, Hunt was inducted into the Kentucky Pro Football Hall of Fame.
