= Super Bowl XXXII =

1998 National Football League championship game

Green Bay Packers (2) (NFC) (13–3)	Denver Broncos (4) (AFC) (12–4)
24	31
Head coach: Mike Holmgren	Head coach: Mike Shanahan
	1	2	3	4	Total
GB	7	7	3	7	24
DEN	7	10	7	7	31
- Date: January 25, 1998
- Kickoff time: 3:25 p.m. PST (UTC-8)
- Stadium: Qualcomm Stadium; San Diego, California
- MVP: Terrell Davis, running back
- Favorite: Packers by 11
- Referee: Ed Hochuli
- Attendance: 68,912

Ceremonies
- National anthem: Jewel
- Coin toss: Joe Gibbs, Doug Williams and Eddie Robinson
- Halftime show: Boyz II Men, Smokey Robinson, The Temptations, Martha Reeves, and Queen Latifah

TV in the United States
- Network: NBC
- Announcers: Dick Enberg, Phil Simms, Paul Maguire, Jim Gray, John Dockery, and Randy Cross
- Nielsen ratings: 44.5 (est. 90 million viewers)
- Market share: 67
- Cost of 30-second commercial: $1.3 million

Radio in the United States
- Network: Westwood One
- Announcers: Howard David and Matt Millen

Super Bowl XXXII was an American football game played between the National Football Conference (NFC) champion and defending Super Bowl XXXI champion Green Bay Packers and the American Football Conference (AFC) champion Denver Broncos to decide the National Football League (NFL) champion for the 1997 season. The Broncos upset the heavily favored Packers by the score of 31–24. The game was played on January 25, 1998, at Qualcomm Stadium in San Diego, California, the second time that the Super Bowl was held in that city. Super Bowl XXXII also made Qualcomm Stadium the only stadium in history to host both the Super Bowl and the World Series in the same year.

This was Denver's first league championship after suffering four previous Super Bowl losses, three of which were under Elway, and snapped a 13-game losing streak for AFC teams in the Super Bowl (the last win being the Los Angeles Raiders' win in Super Bowl XVIII after the 1983 season). The Broncos, who entered the game after posting a 12–4 regular-season record in 1997, became just the second wild card team to win a Super Bowl after the Raiders in Super Bowl XV. The Packers, who entered the game as the defending Super Bowl XXXI champions after posting a 13–3 regular-season record, were the first team favored to win by double digits to lose a Super Bowl since the Minnesota Vikings in Super Bowl IV.

The game was close throughout much of the contest. The Broncos converted two turnovers to take a 17–7 lead in the second quarter before the Packers cut the score to 17–14 at halftime. Green Bay kept pace with Denver in the second half, before tying the game with 13:31 remaining. Both defenses stiffened until Broncos running back Terrell Davis scored the go-ahead touchdown with 1:45 left. Despite suffering a migraine headache that caused him to miss most of the second quarter, Davis was named Super Bowl MVP. He ran for 157 yards, caught two passes for 8 yards, and scored a Super Bowl record three rushing touchdowns.

== Background ==
=== Host selection process ===
NFL owners voted to award Super Bowl XXXII to San Diego during their October 26, 1993, meeting in Chicago. The bidding process was scheduled to award two Super Bowl sites (XXXI and XXXII), the first time that multiple hosts were selected at the same meeting since XXIII and XXIV were voted on in 1985. This was the second time that San Diego hosted the game; the city previously hosted XXII ten years earlier. The Broncos played in both XXII and XXXII, the first franchise to play two different Super Bowls in the same stadium twice; they had already played twice at the Superdome (XII and XXIV).

Four cities entered the bidding for the two games: New Orleans (Superdome), San Diego (Jack Murphy Stadium), Los Angeles/Pasadena (Rose Bowl), and Tampa (Tampa Stadium). The New Orleans representatives bid only on XXXI, Los Angeles only bid on XXXII, while San Diego and Tampa made themselves available for both games. Rules required a candidate to receive a 3/4 vote (21 of 28 owners) in order to win the bidding. If no winner received the necessary votes after three rounds, the fourth round would revert to a simple majority.

New Orleans was selected for XXXI, at which time the voting for XXXII commenced. Tampa was eliminated during the first ballot, leaving San Diego and Los Angeles as the two finalists for XXXII. The prospects for Los Angeles suffered after Raiders owner Al Davis left the meeting before the presentation. San Diego representatives, meanwhile promised to add 12,000 temporary seats to Jack Murphy Stadium to counter the Rose Bowl's capacity advantage. In addition, since San Diego had not hosted the Super Bowl in a decade, and Pasadena had just hosted one nine months earlier, owners tipped towards San Diego. After two deadlocked rounds, San Diego won by simple majority on the fourth vote.

=== Green Bay Packers ===
The Packers entered the 1997 season coming off of their win in Super Bowl XXXI. They then repeated as NFC Central division champions, earning a 13–3 regular-season record. Green Bay's offense ranked 2nd in the league in points scored (only behind their eventual Super Bowl opponent, the Broncos) and 4th in yards gained, while their defense respectively ranked 5th and 7th in those two categories.

Quarterback Brett Favre had another Pro Bowl season and became the first player ever to win the NFL MVP award three times, winning it for the third consecutive year (Favre was named co-MVP in 1997 with Detroit Lions running back Barry Sanders). Favre led the league with 35 passing touchdowns and completed 304 out of 513 attempts for 3,867 yards, with 16 interceptions, while ranking second on the team in rushing with 187 yards and a touchdown. Wide receiver Antonio Freeman led the team in receptions with 81 catches for 1,243 yards and 12 touchdowns. Wide receiver Robert Brooks was also a major deep threat, catching 60 passes for 1,010 yards and 7 touchdowns. Pro Bowl tight end Mark Chmura recorded 38 receptions for 417 yards and 6 touchdowns. Pro Bowl halfback Dorsey Levens, who had the best season of his career, led the team in rushing with 1,435 yards and 7 touchdowns, while also catching 53 passes for 373 yards and 5 touchdowns. Fullback William Henderson rushed for 113 yards and caught 41 passes for 367 yards and a touchdown. On special teams, receiver Bill Schroeder led the team with 33 punt returns for 342 yards, while also gaining 562 yards on 24 kickoff returns.

On the Packers' defense, the line was led by veteran Pro Bowl selection Reggie White, who led the team with 11 sacks. Behind him, Santana Dotson recorded 37 tackles and 5.5 sacks. In the secondary, Pro Bowl defensive back LeRoy Butler led the team with 5 interceptions, while also adding 70 tackles. Safety Eugene Robinson led the team with 74 tackles while also recording 2.5 sacks, 2 fumble recoveries, and 1 interception. Cornerback Mike Prior recorded 4 interceptions, while rookie Darren Sharper recorded 2 of them, both of which he returned for touchdowns.

=== Denver Broncos ===
The Broncos entered Super Bowl XXXII after suffering four Super Bowl losses: Super Bowls XII, XXI, XXII, and XXIV from 1978, 1987, 1988, and 1990, respectively. In all of those losses, the Broncos never had the ability to rush well enough or score enough points to be competitive. Denver had been defeated by a large margin in each one, losing all four by a combined scoring margin of 163–50.

The previous three Super Bowl losses were under starting quarterback John Elway, whose ad-libbing skills enabled the Broncos to advance to the league's championship game in a span of three out of four seasons. Elway also led his team to the 1991 AFC Championship Game, but they lost in a defensive struggle to the Buffalo Bills, 10–7.

The team's fortunes changed when Mike Shanahan became head coach of the Broncos in 1995. Shanahan was previously Denver's offensive coordinator during Super Bowl XXI and XXII losses but was fired in 1991 after a power struggle between him and then-head coach Dan Reeves over the offensive personnel. Shanahan then served as the offensive coordinator for the San Francisco 49ers from 1992 to 1994, including the 49ers' Super Bowl XXIX win. Under Shanahan, the San Francisco offense ranked first in the league in total yards gained for all three of his seasons there.

When Shanahan returned to the Broncos in 1995, he selected running back Terrell Davis in the 6th round of the NFL draft. Davis became the cornerstone of Denver's rebuilt running game, leading the team with 1,117 rushing yards in just his rookie year. The Broncos finished the 1995 regular season with just an 8–8 record. By 1996, the Broncos had the league's best offense, gaining 5,791 total yards, and recorded the AFC's best regular-season record at 13–3, but they were upset by the second year Jacksonville Jaguars, 30–27 in the playoffs.

During the 1997 regular season, the Broncos once again had the league's best offense with 5,872 total yards and led the league in total points scored with 472. Although they recorded a 12–4 regular-season record, they finished in second place behind the 13–3 Kansas City Chiefs in the AFC West.

Davis, a Pro Bowl selection, remained the team's leading rusher, recording 1,750 yards and 15 touchdowns (first in the AFC and second in the NFL behind only co-league MVP Barry Sanders's 2,053 rushing yards), while also catching 42 passes for 287 yards. At 37 years old, Elway still posted a Pro Bowl season with 280 out of 502 completions for 3,635 yards, 27 touchdowns, and only 11 interceptions. He also rushed for 215 yards and another touchdown. Pro Bowl tight end Shannon Sharpe led the team with 72 receptions for 1,107 yards. Wide receiver Rod Smith, who was not drafted by any NFL team and recorded only 22 receptions for 389 yards and 3 touchdowns in his two previous seasons, had a breakout year with 70 receptions for 1,180 yards and 12 touchdowns. Wide receiver Ed McCaffrey, who played in Shanahan's 1994 49ers offense, recorded 45 receptions for 590 yards and 8 touchdowns. Denver's offensive line was led by seven-time Pro Bowl left tackle Gary Zimmerman and Pro Bowl center Tom Nalen.

On defense, the major acquisition to the team prior to the season was former Chiefs defensive lineman Neil Smith. Smith had a Pro Bowl season for the 6th time in his career with 28 tackles and 8.5 sacks. Defensive end Alfred Williams recorded 36 tackles, 8.5 sacks, and a fumble recovery. The linebacking corps was led by veteran Bill Romanowski, who had 55 tackles and 2 sacks, and John Mobley, who led the team with 97 tackles while also recording 4 sacks, a fumble recovery, and an interception.

The secondary was led by veteran defensive backs Tyrone Braxton, who led the team with 4 interceptions for 113 yards and 1 touchdown, and Steve Atwater, who had 53 tackles, 1 sack, 2 fumble recoveries, and 2 interceptions for 42 yards and 1 touchdown. Defensive back Darrien Gordon recorded 50 tackles, 2 sacks, 4 fumble recoveries, 4 interceptions, 64 return yards, and 1 touchdown. He also returned 40 punts for 543 yards and 3 touchdowns.

=== Playoffs ===
The Broncos entered the playoffs as a wild-card team and defeated the Jacksonville Jaguars, 42–17, the Kansas City Chiefs, 14–10, and the Pittsburgh Steelers, 24–21, making Denver the fifth wild-card team to make it to the Super Bowl. Meanwhile, the Packers were victorious against the Tampa Bay Buccaneers, 21–7, and the San Francisco 49ers, 23–10.

=== Super Bowl pregame news ===
The Packers came into the game as 11-point favorites, having compiled a 13–3 record regular-season record compared to the Broncos' 12–4 and coming in as defending Super Bowl champions after winning Super Bowl XXXI 35–21 over the New England Patriots. Furthermore, the Packers had easily crushed their two playoff opponents, while the Broncos had barely edged out their final two postseason victories by a margin of one score.

As the designated home team in the annual rotation between AFC and NFC teams, the Broncos chose to wear their newly unveiled home navy uniforms with white pants. The uniforms replaced the "Orange Crush" uniforms they previously wore in three of their four Super Bowl losses. The Packers wore their customary road white uniforms with gold pants. Both teams wore the Super Bowl XXXII logo on the left breast of their jersey. The Super Bowl logo was previously worn in Super Bowl XXV to commemorate the game's silver anniversary. All future Super Bowl teams would wear the game's logo on their jerseys.

== Broadcasting ==
The game was televised in the United States by NBC, with play-by-play announcer Dick Enberg (calling his eighth and final Super Bowl), color commentators Phil Simms and Paul Maguire, and sideline reporter Jim Gray. Greg Gumbel hosted all the events and was joined by co-host Ahmad Rashad and commentators Cris Collinsworth, Sam Wyche, and Joe Gibbs. This was Gumbel's final assignment for NBC as he returned to CBS for the 1998 season. During the game, NBC (partnering with Silicon Graphics Inc.) included real-time 3D computer graphics on SGI's Onyx2 computers to display a model of Qualcomm Stadium and simulating real-time animation of action such as receiver patterns and yards after the catch; along with a second model known as "Football Guy", which allowed viewers to see defensive players from the quarterback's vantage point, accompanied by commentary by Randy Cross.

This broadcast was the last for NBC as the AFC network after 33 years. CBS was awarded the AFC package for the 1998 season, and NBC would not return to covering the NFL until 2006 when they signed on to televise Sunday Night Football and then Super Bowl XLIII in February 2009. As a result of NBC losing NFL rights, among others, Gumbel and Simms moved on to become CBS's lead NFL broadcast team.

For the Super Bowl lead-out program, NBC broadcast an hour-long episode of 3rd Rock from the Sun, "36! 24! 36! Dick". As a transition from NBC's live Super Bowl coverage and the program, Gumbel played himself attempting to close the postgame show before he was "attacked" by show star John Lithgow. NBC's Denver affiliate KUSA instead broadcast its own 30-minute local postgame show before airing the episode. (WGBA-TV aired the Super Bowl in the Green Bay area.)

This was the last time Channel 4 in the United Kingdom showed the Super Bowl – and their last NFL coverage until 2010 – after they had been showing the event since 1983 (Super Bowl XVII). Only Sky Sports showed it live until Channel 5 joined them in 2003 (Super Bowl XXXVII). It also marked the last Super Bowl until 2007 for CTV in Canada after airing the NFL and the event since Super Bowl XVI (the lead out program rights were held by new rightsholder Global); from 1999 to 2006 the Super Bowl aired on the Global Television Network. CTV had aired NFL football since 1970 and the Super Bowl since 1982 (Super Bowl XVI). It was also the final NFL game for GMA Network in the Philippines until the 2006 season; GMA had aired NFL football since 1986 and the Super Bowl since Super Bowl XXI in 1987. The Super Bowl was broadcast on ABC 5, also from 1999 until 2006. It was also the final Super Bowl in which the Televisa family of networks aired on its own in Mexico, also until 2007, being broadcast on Canal 5; Televisa had aired NFL football since 1970 and the Super Bowl since 1988 (at the time, the only other Super Bowl in San Diego). Azteca 13 likewise exclusively aired all Super Bowls from 1999 until 2006, except for 2004, including Super Bowl XXXVII which was the next Super Bowl to be played at Qualcomm Stadium.

In Australia, Super Bowl was broadcast live on SBS.

This game was later featured on NFL's Greatest Games as This One's for John.

== Entertainment ==
=== Pregame ceremonies ===
The pregame show, narrated by actor and comedian Phil Hartman (who was murdered four months later), celebrated the music and history of California. It featured performances by The 5th Dimension, Lee Greenwood, and The Beach Boys. Singer Jewel later sang the U.S. national anthem. She was accompanied by the color guard from Camp Pendleton and an Army-Navy honor guard consisting of members of the ROTCs of Kent State University and University of Akron. The 43rd Airlift Wing from Pope Field provided the flyover and missing man formation after the National Anthem.

To honor the 10th anniversary of the Washington Redskins' win in Super Bowl XXII, the only other previous Super Bowl played in San Diego, the game's MVP, Doug Williams, and former head coach Joe Gibbs, participated during the coin toss ceremony. They were joined by the recently retired longtime college football head coach Eddie Robinson, who ran the Grambling State University Tigers football team from 1942 until 1997.

=== Halftime show ===
The halftime show was titled "A Tribute to Motown's 40th Anniversary" and featured Boyz II Men, Smokey Robinson, Queen Latifah, Martha Reeves and The Temptations. With her performance, Latifah was the first rapper to perform at the Super Bowl.

== Game summary ==
External videos
- Full game broadcast on NBC on YouTube

=== First quarter ===
Packers wide receiver Antonio Freeman returned the opening kickoff 19 yards to the Green Bay 24-yard line. On 3rd-and-9, quarterback Brett Favre completed a 13-yard pass to Freeman. Then running back Dorsey Levens rushed for 27 yards on three consecutive plays, advancing the ball to the Denver 35-yard line. Favre capped the drive with two completions to Freeman, a 13-yard gain followed by a 22-yard touchdown strike, giving the Packers a 7–0 lead. The touchdown-scoring drive on the opening kickoff was only the third in Super Bowl history, joining the Miami Dolphins in Super Bowl VIII and the San Francisco 49ers in Super Bowl XXIX).

The Broncos responded with a 10-play, 58-yard drive, ignited by running back Vaughn Hebron returning the kickoff 32 yards to the Denver 42-yard line. Denver then drove to the Green Bay 46-yard line. On 3rd-and-10, a holding penalty on Packers cornerback Doug Evans nullified quarterback John Elway's incomplete pass to wide receiver Willie Green and gave the Broncos a new set of downs down. On the next play, running back Terrell Davis reeled off his longest run of the game, a 27-yard gain to the Green Bay 14. After a 2-yard run by Davis, Elway scrambled 10 yards to set up 1st-and-goal at the 2-yard line. Two plays later Davis scored a 1-yard touchdown run to tie the game.

On the second play of the Packers' next possession, Broncos safety Tyrone Braxton intercepted a pass from Favre at the Green Bay 45-yard line. Davis ran for 16 yards on Denver's first play, bringing the ball to the 29. A combination of short passing and 10 yards gained on three more rushes by Davis (who was briefly taken out of the game during the drive because the onset of a migraine headache caused by an unintentional trip by defensive tackle Santana Dotson, which had severely impaired his vision) brought the ball to the Green Bay 1 yard line as the 1st quarter expired.

=== Second quarter ===
Denver head coach Mike Shanahan schemed a play-action rush for the first play of the second quarter. Believing that the Packers would not be fooled by a fake third-down handoff on the one yard line without Davis on the field, he reinserted the back. The misdirection worked, and Elway drove in for a touchdown, giving the Broncos a 14–7 lead. Davis later said his vision was so impaired that he was afraid Elway would call an audible at the line and try to hand him the ball. Instead, he perfectly executed the play, drawing the Green Bay defense into the middle of the line and allowing Elway to rush into the end zone on the right completely untouched. By halftime, Davis had taken migraine medication, and his vision had returned to normal, allowing him to play the rest of the game.

On the Packers' ensuing possession, Broncos safety Steve Atwater strip-sacked Favre, and defensive end Neil Smith recovered the fumble on the Green Bay 33-yard line. Despite being unable to get a first down, Denver nonetheless capitalized on the turnover when kicker Jason Elam kicked a 51-yard field goal, then the second-longest in Super Bowl history, to increase their lead to 17–7. Both teams exchanged punts on their next possessions, and Denver safety Dedrick Dodge downed punter Tom Rouen's 47-yard kick at Green Bay's 5-yard line with 7:38 left in the half. But the Packers stormed down the field on their ensuing drive, marching 95 yards in 17 plays, which featured two completions from Favre to tight end Mark Chmura for 32 yards (the first one being a 21-yard catch on 3rd-and-10 from his own 5-yard line), as well as three runs by Levens for 26 yards. The drive ended with Favre's 6-yard touchdown pass to Chmura with just 12 seconds left in the half, cutting Green Bay's deficit to 17–14.

=== Third quarter ===
On the first play after the second half kickoff, Davis fumbled the ball while surrounded by several defenders; Packers cornerback Tyrone Williams recovered, giving Green Bay excellent field position on the Denver 26-yard line. The Broncos' defense forced a three-and-out, but defensive end Alfred Williams was flagged for jumping offsides on 4th-and-4, negating a 39-yard field goal by Packers kicker Ryan Longwell and giving the Packers a new set of downs at the Broncos' 15-yard line. Back-to-back false starts by offensive linemen Adam Timmerman and Frank Winters pushed the Packers back to the 25-yard line. On third down and twenty Levens' 16-yard run run came up short of a first down; Longwell then kicked a 27-yard field goal, tying the game at 17–17.

Denver's offense stalled once more on their next possession, resulting in a punt, but their defense forced Green Bay into a third straight three-and-out. On the ensuing punt Broncos defensive back Tony Veland was called for an offsides penalty, giving the Packers another new set of downs near midfield. A fourth straight three-and-out forced another Green Bay punt.

The Broncos got a break during the ensuing punt when cornerback Darrien Gordon mishandled the ball and recovered it at his own 1-yard line. However, Green Bay was forced to replay the punt when long snapper Rob Davis was flagged for going downfield as an ineligible player, but punter Craig Hentrich's 51-yard kick pinned Denver back at their own 8-yard line. But the Green Bay defense could not stop Denver as they marched on a 13-play, 92-yard drive. Aided by a 36-yard reception by wide receiver Ed McCaffrey (the longest play of the game), the Broncos advanced to the Green Bay 12-yard line. On 3rd-and-6 from the 12-yard line, Elway scrambled for an 8-yard run and dove for the first down, a play in which he was hit so hard by three Packers defenders that he spun sideways in mid-air. This run was later referred to as "The Helicopter," and what many consider as Elway's career-defining moment and the defining moment of the game. Two plays later, Davis scored on another 1-yard touchdown run, giving the Broncos a 24–17 lead.

On the ensuing kickoff, Denver fullback Detron Smith ran full speed into the wedge of the Green Bay blockers, forcing Freeman outside, to his left. Freeman fumbled while being tackled by Veland, and cornerback Tim McKyer recovered the ball for the Broncos at the Green Bay 22. In the quarter's closing seconds, Denver immediately tried to capitalize on the turnover by trying a quick-strike touchdown pass, intended for wide receiver Rod Smith as he ran a post pattern following a fake handoff and a roll out by Elway, but Packers safety Eugene Robinson intercepted Elway's pass in the end zone and returned it to the 15-yard line. On the last play of the quarter after the turnover, Favre completed a 27-yard pass to Freeman to reach the Green Bay 42.

=== Fourth quarter ===
Freeman's reception was the start of a four-play, 85-yard drive on four straight Green Bay pass completions. After a 25-yard pass interference penalty on Gordon, Favre completed back-to-back passes to Freeman; the first for 17 yards, and the second for a 13-yard touchdown. On the scoring play, Freeman and wide receiver Robert Brooks ran a "criss-cross" pattern, with Freeman on the inside running towards the sidelines. Gordon hesitated as to which receiver to cover, and Favre hit Freeman for the score, tying the game once again, at 24–24.

After the ensuing kickoff, the Packers forced Denver's offense to punt from its 29 yard-line. With a short punt of only 33 yards, the Packers took possession with good field position, having 1st-and-10 at their own 48-yard line. On 3rd-and-8 from the Denver 39, Favre dropped back to pass and Denver's defense blitzed, leaving Brooks to face one-on-one coverage deep. Favre attempted the pass to a seemingly wide-open Brooks at the Denver 16-yard line, but Atwater knocked the pass away at the last second, leaving the Packers just outside of field goal range and forcing another punt.

The Broncos took over at their own 18 yard line and drove to the Packers 39 yard line. Despite being tired and having had to play from behind almost the entire game, the Packers' defense was still able to stop the Broncos' just outside of field goal range on the ensuing possession, forcing a punt and giving Green Bay a first down at their own 10-yard line with 5:25 remaining in the game. The Broncos' defense responded with its fifth three-and-out of the second half.

Hentrich then punted the ball 39 yards to the Packers' 49-yard line, giving Denver a chance for a potential game-winning drive with only 3:27 left in the game. On the first play of the ensuing drive, Packers defensive tackle Darius Holland committed a 15-yard face-mask penalty while tackling Davis on a 2-yard run, moving the ball to the 32-yard line. Two plays later, Elway completed a 23-yard pass to fullback Howard Griffith, aided by a powerful block by McCaffrey. A holding penalty on tight end Shannon Sharpe nullified an 8-yard touchdown run by Davis and pushed the Broncos back to the 18-yard line. Davis then rushed 17 yards to the 1-yard line, and the Broncos called a time-out, their first. This left the Broncos facing 2nd-and-goal with 1:47 left in the game. Both teams had two time-outs remaining.

Packers coach Mike Holmgren told his team to let the Broncos score to maximize the time the Packers would have on the clock for a potential game-tying drive. He admitted later that he had thought that it was 1st-and-goal rather than 2nd-and-goal, a crucial distinction in clock-management decision-making on the play. Davis then scored his third rushing touchdown, with 1:45 remaining in regulation, putting Denver ahead 31–24.

The Packers still had one more chance to either tie the game before the end of regulation and send the contest into overtime, or go for a two-point conversion for the win. Shanahan famously instructed his defensive coordinators to keep playing the same blitzing defense they had done throughout the game, instead of falling into a prevent defense. Freeman returned the Broncos' kickoff 22 yards to the 30-yard line. A 22-yard screen pass to Levens immediately advanced the ball to the Denver 48-yard line, with 1:30 remaining. Green Bay then hurried to the line of scrimmage and ran another screen to Levens, for no gain. The 19 seconds burned off the game clock caused the Packers to take their second time-out.

On the next play, Favre completed a 13-yard pass to Levens, who ran out of bounds at the Broncos' 35-yard line, stopping the clock. With 1:04 left, the Packers had a first down with one time-out still remaining.

On first down, Favre completed a 4-yard pass to Levens, who was stopped in bounds by linebacker John Mobley. Even with the Packers in hurry-up mode the short gain took 22 seconds off the clock before the next snap. With 42 seconds remaining Favre's pass to Freeman hit him in both hands and the chest at the Denver 15, but Broncos cornerback Darian Gordon stripped the ball loose. The incomplete pass stopped the clock, leaving the Packers with 3rd-and-6 and 37 seconds remaining. On third down Favre passed to Brooks, covered by cornerback Randy Hilliard, but a hard hit to both by Atwater broke it up (and sent all three players out of the game). Although play had been stopped for an injury time out, NFL rules governing the final two minutes of a game charged both teams with a time-out, erasing Green Bay's last. With 32 seconds remaining and Green Bay facing 4th-and-6 on the Denver 31-yard line, Favre threw a short pass over the middle intended to tight end Mark Chmura. Mobley broke it up, giving the ball back to the Broncos and cementing their first-ever Super Bowl victory.

=== Post-game ===
During the post-game victory celebration, Broncos owner Pat Bowlen held the Vince Lombardi Trophy aloft and said, "this one's for John!" saluting Elway's successful completion of his long quest for a Super Bowl victory. Eighteen years later, after the Broncos won Super Bowl 50, Elway, now the general manager for the team, would salute Bowlen, who had been diagnosed the year before with Alzheimer's disease, in the same fashion by raising the trophy and exclaiming "this one's for Pat!"

Denver's offensive performance had been so consistent that except for two penalties and Elway's kneel-downs to end each half, the Broncos did not lose yardage on any play from scrimmage. Green Bay's Reggie White, Gilbert Brown, LeRoy Butler and others were unable to register a sack against the Broncos' front line. Elway completed 12 out of 22 passes for 123 yards, with 1 interception. He became the sixth player to score touchdowns in three different Super Bowls, joining Lynn Swann, Franco Harris, Thurman Thomas, Jerry Rice, and Emmitt Smith. He was also the Broncos' second-leading rusher behind Terrell Davis, with 17 yards and a touchdown on 5 carries. Davis became the only player to rush for three touchdowns in a Super Bowl, and the only non-San Francisco 49er to score three in a Super Bowl - joining Roger Craig, Jerry Rice (twice), and Ricky Watters in the feat. Only New England running back James White has matched this achievement since, in Super Bowl LI. Davis's three touchdowns in this Super Bowl gave him a total of 48 points (8 touchdowns) during the postseason, an NFL record.

Denver's defense limited Green Bay to only 10 points in the second half, despite Green Bay having nine possessions during it. The Packers' first four possessions of the second half were all 3-and-out's. Their fifth possession of the second half resulted in a lost fumble by their kick return team, the sixth possession resulted in an 85-yard drive and a touchdown, the seventh ended in four plays and a punt, the eighth resulted in another 3-and-out, and the ninth and final possession ended on a fourth down stop.

Both Freeman and Favre had outstanding performances for the second Super Bowl game in a row. Favre completed 25 out of 42 passes for 256 yards and 3 touchdowns, with 1 interception. Freeman caught 9 passes for 126 yards and 2 touchdowns, and also gained another 104 yards on 6 kickoff returns, giving him 230 total yards, the third highest total in Super Bowl history. Freeman also tied himself for second all-time in touchdown catches in Super Bowls with three, joining Lynn Swann, John Stallworth, and Cliff Branch, trailing only Rice's eight. He also became just the third player to have at least 100 yards receiving in back-to-back Super Bowls, joining Rice and Stallworth. Levens was Green Bay's leading rusher with 90 yards, and was their second-leading receiver with 56 yards on 6 receptions.

Denver, which had been 0-4 in Super Bowls, became the first team with even a previous 0–2 record to win a Championship. The Broncos' victory snapped the NFC's 13-game winning streak in the Super Bowl, which traced back to the Los Angeles Raiders victory over the Washington Redskins in Super Bowl XVIII. Denver also became the first team to score on four 1-yard touchdown runs in a Super Bowl. The Packers became the third defending Super Bowl champion to lose, joining the Dallas Cowboys (1977–78: won Super Bowl XII, lost Super Bowl XIII) and the Washington Redskins (1982–83: won Super Bowl XVII, lost Super Bowl XVIII), and would be later joined by the Seattle Seahawks (2013–14: won Super Bowl XLVIII, lost Super Bowl XLIX), the New England Patriots (2016–17: won Super Bowl LI, lost Super Bowl LII) and the Kansas City Chiefs (twice, 2019-20: won Super Bowl LIV, lost Super Bowl LV, and 2023-24: won Super Bowl LVIII, lost Super Bowl LIX).

=== Box score ===
Super Bowl XXXII: Denver Broncos 31, Green Bay Packers 24

Quarter	1	2	3	4	Total
Packers (NFC)	7	7	3	7	24
Broncos (AFC)	7	10	7	7	31

at Qualcomm Stadium, San Diego, California

- Date: January 25, 1998
- Game time: 3:24 p.m. PST
- Game weather: 67 °F (19 °C), sunny

Scoring summary

Quarter	Time	Drive			Team	Scoring information	Score	
Quarter	Time	Plays	Yards	TOP	Team	Scoring information	GB	DEN
1	10:58	8	76	4:02	GB	Antonio Freeman 22-yard touchdown reception from Brett Favre, Ryan Longwell kick good	7	0
1	5:39	10	58	5:19	DEN	Terrell Davis 1-yard touchdown run, Jason Elam kick good	7	7
2	14:55	8	45	4:54	DEN	John Elway 1-yard touchdown run, Elam kick good	7	14
2	12:21	4	0	1:02	DEN	51-yard field goal by Elam	7	17
2	0:12	17	95	7:26	GB	Mark Chmura 6-yard touchdown reception from Favre, Longwell kick good	14	17
3	11:59	7	17	2:42	GB	27-yard field goal by Longwell	17	17
3	0:34	13	92	7:12	DEN	Davis 1-yard touchdown run, Elam kick good	17	24
4	13:32	4	85	1:39	GB	Freeman 13-yard touchdown reception from Favre, Longwell kick good	24	24
4	1:45	5	49	1:42	DEN	Davis 1-yard touchdown run, Elam kick good	24	31
"TOP" = time of possession. For other American football terms, see Glossary of American football.							24	31

== Final statistics ==
Sources: NFL.com Super Bowl XXXII, Super Bowl XXXII Play Finder Den, Super Bowl XXXII Play Finder GB

=== Statistical comparison ===
Statistic	Green Bay Packers	Denver Broncos
First downs	21	21
First downs rushing	4	14
First downs passing	14	5
First downs penalty	3	2
Third down efficiency	5/14	5/10
Fourth down efficiency	0/1	0/0
Net yards rushing	95	179
Rushing attempts	20	39
Yards per rush	4.8	4.6
Passing – Completions/attempts	25/42	12/22
Times sacked-total yards	1–1	0–0
Interceptions thrown	1	1
Net yards passing	255	123
Total net yards	350	302
Punt returns-total yards	0–0	0–0
Kickoff returns-total yards	6–104	5–95
Interceptions-total return yards	1–17	1–0
Punts-average yardage	4–35.5	4–36.5
Fumbles-lost	2–2	1–1
Penalties-total yards	9–59	7–65
Time of possession	27:35	32:25
Turnovers	3	2

=== Individual statistics ===
Packers passing
	C/ATT^{1}	Yds	TD	INT	Rating
Brett Favre	25/42	256	3	1	91.0
Packers rushing
	Car^{2}	Yds	TD	LG^{3}	Yds/Car
Dorsey Levens	19	90	0	16	4.74
Robert Brooks	1	5	0	5	5.00
Packers receiving
	Rec^{4}	Yds	TD	LG^{3}	Target^{5}
Antonio Freeman	9	126	2	27	13
Dorsey Levens	6	56	0	22	6
Mark Chmura	4	43	1	21	5
Robert Brooks	3	16	0	10	11
William Henderson	2	9	0	7	4
Terry Mickens	1	6	0	6	1
Derrick Mayes	0	0	0	0	2

Broncos passing
	C/ATT^{1}	Yds	TD	INT	Rating
John Elway	12/22	123	0	1	51.9
Broncos rushing
	Car^{2}	Yds	TD	LG^{3}	Yds/Car
Terrell Davis	30	157	3	27	5.23
John Elway	5	17	1	10	3.40
Vaughn Hebron	3	3	0	2	1.00
Howard Griffith	1	2	0	2	2.00
Broncos receiving
	Rec^{4}	Yds	TD	LG^{3}	Target^{5}
Shannon Sharpe	5	38	0	12	5
Ed McCaffrey	2	45	0	36	3
Terrell Davis	2	8	0	4	3
Howard Griffith	1	23	0	23	2
Vaughn Hebron	1	5	0	5	2
Dwayne Carswell	1	4	0	4	1
Rod Smith	0	0	0	0	3
Willie Green	0	0	0	0	3

^{1}Completions/attempts ^{2}Carries ^{3}Long gain ^{4}Receptions ^{5}Times targeted

=== Records set ===
One new record was set and several were tied in Super Bowl XXXII, according to the official NFL.com boxscore, the 2016 NFL Record & Fact Book and the ProFootball reference.com game summary.

Player records set
Most rushing touchdowns, game	3	Terrell Davis (Denver)
Records tied
Most points scored, game	18	Terrell Davis (Denver)
Most touchdowns, game	3	Terrell Davis (Denver)
Most interceptions thrown, career	7	John Elway (Denver)

Team records tied
Most rushing touchdowns	4	Broncos
Fewest times sacked	0	Broncos
Fewest passing touchdowns	0	Broncos
Fewest punt returns, game	0	Broncos; Packers
Fewest rushing touchdowns	0	Packers

Records tied, both team totals
	Total	Broncos	Packers
Most rushing touchdowns	4	4	0
Fewest times sacked	1	0	1
Fewest punt returns, game	0	0	0
Fewest punt return yards gained	0 yds	0	0

== Starting lineups ==
Hall of Fame‡

Green Bay	Position	Position	Denver
Offense
Antonio Freeman	WR		Rod Smith
Ross Verba	LT		Gary Zimmerman‡
Aaron Taylor	LG		Mark Schlereth
Frank Winters	C		Tom Nalen
Adam Timmerman	RG		Brian Habib
Earl Dotson	RT		Tony Jones
Mark Chmura	TE		Shannon Sharpe‡
Robert Brooks	WR		Ed McCaffrey
Brett Favre‡	QB		John Elway‡
Dorsey Levens	RB		Terrell Davis‡
William Henderson	FB		Howard Griffith
Defense
Reggie White‡	LE		Neil Smith
Santana Dotson	LDT		Keith Traylor
Gilbert Brown	RDT		Maa Tanuvasa
Gabe Wilkins	RE		Alfred Williams
Seth Joyner	LLB	WLB	John Mobley
Bernardo Harris	MLB		Allen Aldridge
Brian Williams	RLB	SLB	Bill Romanowski
Tyrone Williams	LCB		Ray Crockett
Doug Evans	RCB		Darrien Gordon
LeRoy Butler ‡	SS		Tyrone Braxton
Eugene Robinson	FS		Steve Atwater‡

== Officials ==
- Referee: Ed Hochuli #85 first Super Bowl
- Umpire: Jim Quirk #5 first Super Bowl
- Head linesman: John Schleyer #21 first Super Bowl
- Line judge: Ben Montgomery #117 first Super Bowl
- Back judge: Paul Baetz #22 third Super Bowl (XXIII, XXVI)
- Side judge: Doug Toole #4 first Super Bowl
- Field judge: Don Dorkowski #113 first Super Bowl
- Alternate referee: Dick Hantak #105 (back judge for XVII, referee for XXVII)
- Alternate umpire: Ed Coukart #71 first Super Bowl

NOTE: the titles of field judge and back judge were swapped before the next season.

John Robison was originally assigned as the field judge, but was pulled by Vice President of Officiating Jerry Seeman after he missed a call in the Vikings-Giants wild card game. Don Dorkowski, the field judge for the NFC championship game, was named as Robison's replacement.
