= Brady–Belichick era =

Sports dynasty of the New England Patriots

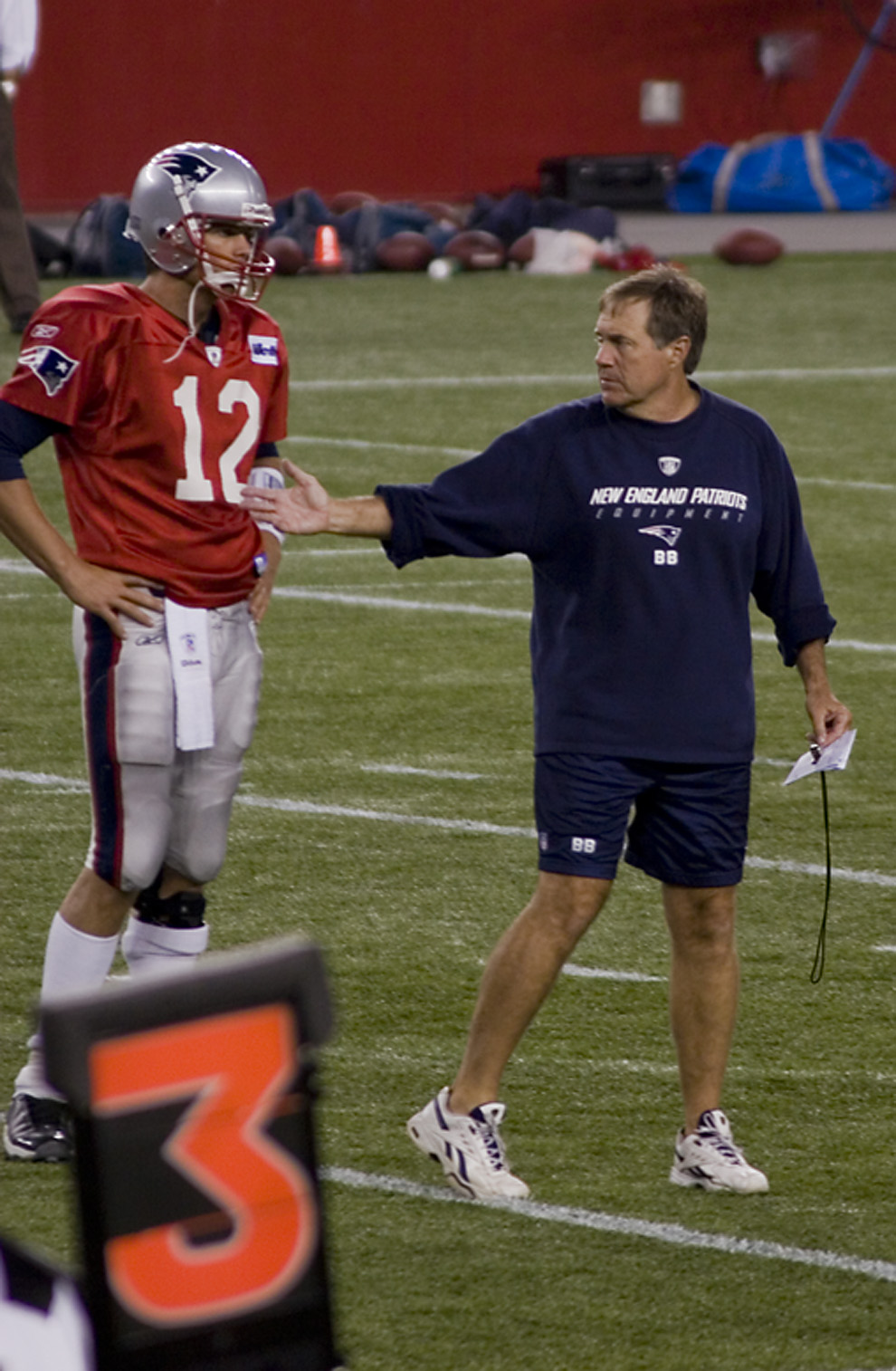
Brady and Belichick, pictured in 2009

The Tom Brady–Bill Belichick era, also known as the New England Patriots dynasty was a sports dynasty of the New England Patriots in the National Football League (NFL) that lasted from the 2000 to the 2019 season. The dynasty is named after quarterback Tom Brady and Patriots head coach Bill Belichick, who are regarded as among the greatest in their respective positions. Belichick and Brady are generally credited with the Patriots' success, and for creating one of the longest and most dominant dynasties in the history of professional sports. They are also credited with formulating the "Patriot Way"; a team culture that emphasized personal accountability, consistent improvement, and team success over personal gain.

Under Belichick and Brady, the Patriots played in nine Super Bowls during Brady's 18 seasons as the primary starter (Note: Brady missed the majority of the 2008 season due to injury.), which is more than any other NFL franchise. The Patriots won a league record of six Super Bowls (tied with the Pittsburgh Steelers). The team also recorded 19 successive winning seasons, 17 division titles (11 of which were consecutive from 2009 to 2019), 13 AFC Championship Game appearances (including eight consecutive from 2011 to 2018), and the league’s only undefeated 16-game regular season in 2007.

In addition to helping set the Patriots' franchise records, Brady and Belichick hold the records for the most Super Bowl appearances and victories by a player and head coach. Belichick also holds the records for the most playoff wins by a head coach (31) and Super Bowl appearances by an individual (12), while Brady holds the quarterback records for career wins (264), regular season wins (230), and playoff wins (34) and the record for Super Bowl MVP (Most Valuable Player) awards (five).

The era ended when Brady left the Patriots as a free agent for the Tampa Bay Buccaneers in March 2020, where he won his seventh Super Bowl. Belichick remained as head coach of the Patriots until the end of the 2023 NFL season, which coincided with Brady's retirement from the sport.

Despite their success, the Brady-Belichick era also faced controversy. In 2007, the Belichick and the Patriots were disciplined by the NFL for an incident involving unauthorized videotaping of opposing coaches'' signals, known as Spygate. Furthermore, in 2015, Brady was suspended for his alleged involvement in a controversy concerning the air pressure of footballs used during the Patriots' 2014 AFC Championship game.

== Bill Belichick ==
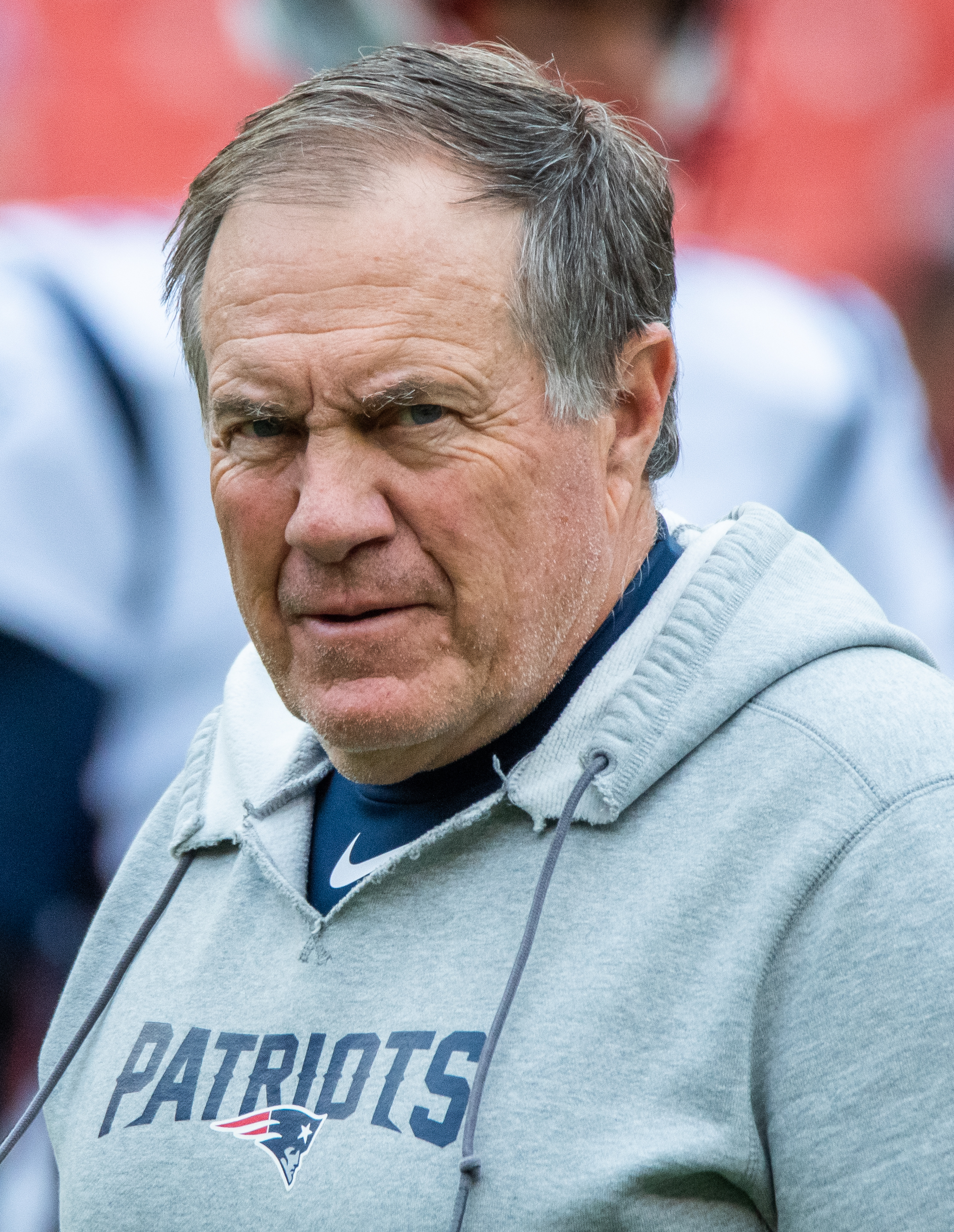
Bill Belichick was the head coach of the Patriots from 2000 to 2023

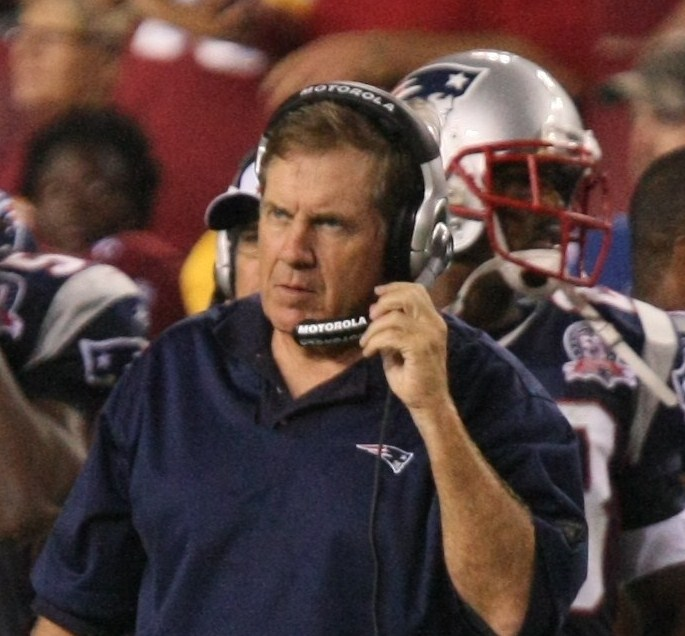
Belichick at the preseason game against the Washington Redskins in August 28, 2009

Belichick joined the Patriots in 1996 as an assistant head coach and defensive backs coach for Bill Parcells. He previously spent 13 years with the New York Giants from 1979 to 1990. During this period, he was the defensive coordinator during the Giants' 39–20 victory over the Denver Broncos in Super Bowl XXI and 20–19 victory over the Buffalo Bills in Super Bowl XXV. During Belichick's time with the Patriots, him and Brady recorded 153 regular-season wins, which is the most by any head coach and quarterback since the 1970 AFL-NFL merger.

The Patriots went 11–5 in 1996 and earned a trip to Super Bowl XXXI, but lost to the Green Bay Packers. With Belichick as head coach, the Patriots made the playoffs 18 of his 24 seasons. Belichick subsequently served as assistant head coach and defensive coordinator for the New York Jets. Belichick was supposed to be Bill Parcells, the Jets head coach, successor, but instead resigned and went to New England as their head coach. During his tenure in New England, the Patriots missed the playoffs only six times: 2000 (5–11), 2002 (9–7), 2008 (11–5), 2020 (7–9), 2022 (8–9), and 2023 (4–13). In 2008, Belichick coached the Patriots to an 11–5 record despite losing franchise quarterback Tom Brady in Week 1 versus the Kansas City Chiefs. A series of division tiebreakers left the 11–5 Miami Dolphins as AFC East champions, making the 2008 Patriots the second team in NFL history to go 11–5 and miss the playoffs.

In 2010, he was selected as the first-team head coach in the National Football League 2000s All-Decade Team. He has won the AP Coach of the Year award three times in his career, all during his time with the Patriots. As head coach, Belichick is 225–79 (.740 winning percentage) in regular season games and has coached the Patriots to 40 postseason games, winning 30. From 2010 to 2017, Belichick coached the Patriots to 8 consecutive 12+ win seasons, which is an NFL record. Since 2002, the Patriots have lost more than 5 games just three times. As the Patriots head coach, Belichick has had just four losing seasons, in 2000, 2020, 2022 and 2023. In 21 seasons from 2001 onwards, the Patriots have won 16 AFC East titles and earned a wild-card berth in 2021. Such dominance in the salary cap era, which limits teams in how much they can pay players and therefore forces parity, is credited to Belichick's football prowess.

Belichick is known for taking players who had lackluster or declining careers and making them productive for one or more seasons, including RB Corey Dillon, who gained 1,738 yards from scrimmage, including 1,635 rushing yards. For example, Hall of Fame wide receiver Randy Moss was traded to New England in 2007 after lackluster play for the Oakland Raiders, but went on to catch 23 touchdowns in 2007, setting an NFL record. Belichick drafted wide receiver Julian Edelman in the 7th round. Edelman went on to set a franchise record for postseason receptions and caught one of the most memorable catches in Super Bowl LI. He also earned a Super Bowl MVP award two years later. Most notably, Belichick is credited with drafting Brady with the 199th pick in the 2000 NFL Draft. Brady went on to help the Patriots form a dynasty that lasted from 2001 until 2019, and currently holds every NFL postseason passing record except yards per attempt and completion percentage.

Belichick is third all-time for wins as a coach. He was the longest tenured active coach in the NFL when he left the Patriots. He has the most postseason wins, recording 31. He is the only coach to win three Super Bowls in four years and the only head coach to have won six Super Bowls.

== Tom Brady ==
Quarterback Tom Brady was the Patriots' primary starter for 18 seasons

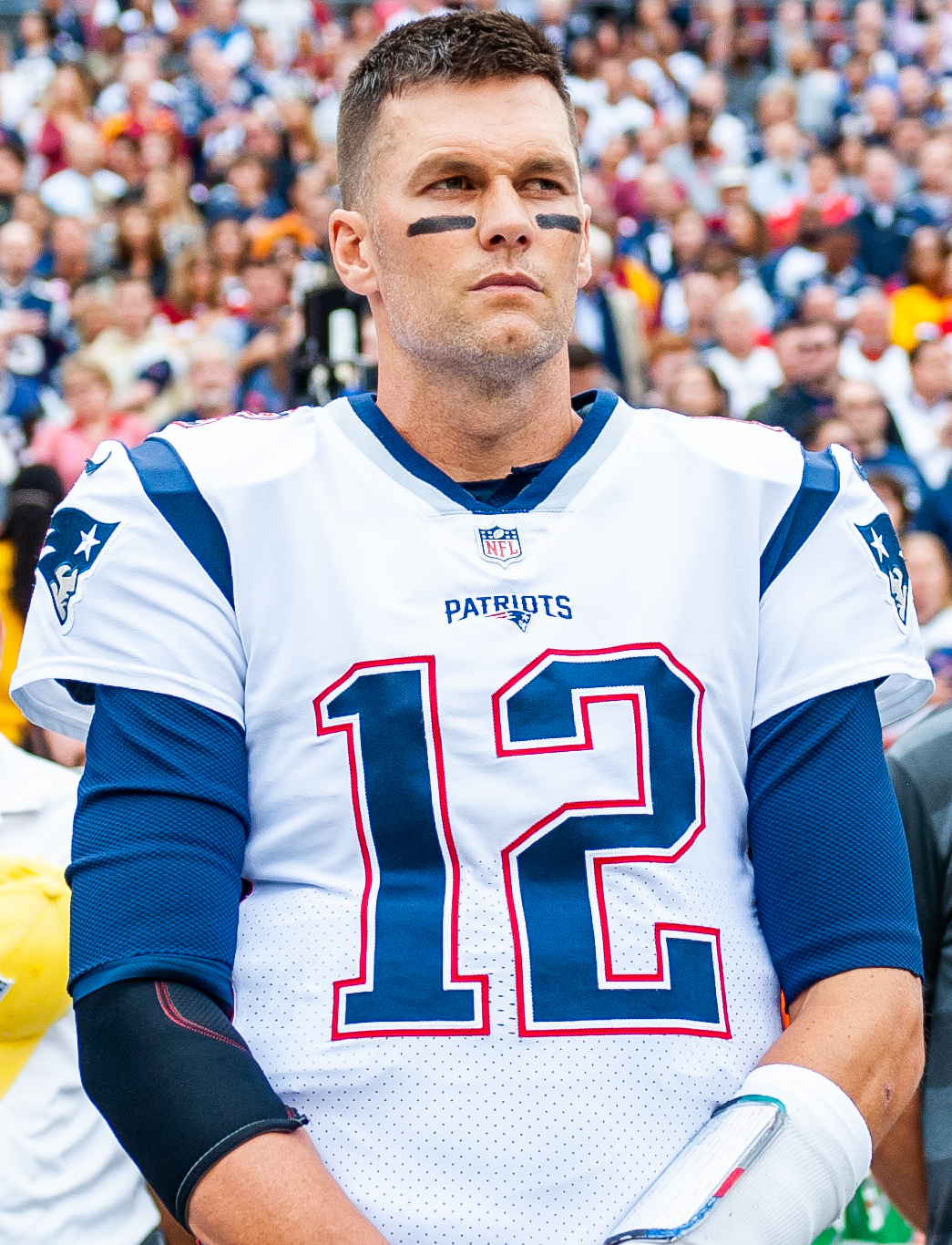
Brady in 2019

Brady attended college at the University of Michigan, where he battled for the starting role with Brian Griese and Drew Henson. He led the Wolverines to the 2000 Orange Bowl, with a record 10–2 as starter during the regular season. Despite trailing by two scores twice during the game, Brady led the Wolverines to an overtime win over the Alabama Crimson Tide, 35–34. His come-from-behind victory earned him the nickname "Comeback Kid".

Due to questions about his starting ability in college and uninspiring physical measurables, Brady fell in the 2000 draft until he was the seventh quarterback selected as pick 199 in the 6th round by the New England Patriots. He spent his rookie year as backup to franchise quarterback Drew Bledsoe and would not start a game until the next year when Bledsoe, who had signed a 10-year, $103 million contract that offseason, was seriously injured by a sideline hit by Jets linebacker Mo Lewis on September 23, 2001.

Brady went 11–3 as a starter in 2001, leading the Patriots to the Super Bowl XXXVI against the St. Louis Rams. After trailing 17–3 in the second half, the Rams stormed back to tie the game 17–17 with 1:30 left in the game. With no timeouts, the Patriots drove downfield to set up a 48-yard field goal by Adam Vinatieri to win the game in the closing seconds.

Brady holds the NFL postseason record for appearances, wins, pass attempts, completions, yards, and touchdowns. In the Super Bowl, Brady holds the record for most pass attempts, completions, touchdowns, and yards. In Super Bowl LI he helped the Patriots, who were down 28–3 in the third quarter against the Atlanta Falcons, score 31 unanswered points and win the game in overtime, 34–28, and set a Super Bowl record with 466 passing yards. The following year, he broke his own record by throwing for 505 yards in a loss to the Philadelphia Eagles.

Brady holds every Super Bowl record in passing except for completion percentage and interceptions. In his 10 appearances in 22 years, he has come away with 7 wins and 5 Super Bowl MVPs (including 1 appearance, win and MVP with the Tampa Bay Buccaneers).

With the Patriots, Brady threw touchdowns to 77 players, breaking the NFL record of 70 held by Vinny Testaverde. By retirement, he had extended his record to 96. Throughout Brady's career, he was widely considered as the greatest quarterback in NFL history, earning his nickname as the "GOAT" (Greatest of All Time) for his accomplishments, longevity, and success in the league.

== Brady–Belichick era ==
In the 2000 NFL draft, first year head coach Bill Belichick was looking for ways to improve a New England Patriots team that had not been to a Super Bowl since 1996. Belichick had been hired after 3rd-year head coach Pete Carroll was fired following the 1999 season. Before the draft the Patriots sent quarterbacks coach Dick Rehbein to scout quarterbacks for the draft. When Rehbein returned, he stated that Brady was the best quarterback prospect for the Patriots' system. Despite the Patriots already having a franchise quarterback in Drew Bledsoe, they drafted Tom Brady in the sixth round.

=== 2000–2002: Beginnings and first Super Bowl ===
The Patriots went 5–11 in 2000, the last losing season the Patriots had until 2020. Belichick, after a loss during the season, claimed that "I can't win games with 40 good players while the other team has 53" after many players showed up to camp out of condition.

In 2001, Belichick made major reforms. The beginning of the culture he brought to New England, dubbed the "Patriot Way", was beginning to show with wide receiver Terry Glenn's contract holdout. The Patriots could not afford to raise Glenn's salary, and Belichick suspended Glenn indefinitely after repeated failed drug tests. Glenn did not receive a ring when the Patriots won Super Bowl XXXVI that year.

The Patriots started 0–1, and faced a division rival in Week 2 against the New York Jets. Late in the game, down 10–3, quarterback Drew Bledsoe rolled out of the pocket and tried to scramble down the sideline, until he was hit by Jets linebacker Mo Lewis. In the hospital later that day, Bledsoe came perilously close to death resulting from internal bleeding sustained in the hit. The concussion alone had been more than enough to sideline him for the remainder of the game. The Patriots lost the game, moving to 0–2. Second year backup QB Tom Brady started the next game against the Indianapolis Colts, the first of 17 games in the famous Tom Brady–Peyton Manning rivalry. Brady led the team to a 44-13 win, taking the first of his 11 wins in the series which includes two playoff games. Although Bledsoe later recovered from his injury, Belichick announced that Brady would remain the starting quarterback for the remainder of the season. The Patriots finished the season on an 11–3 run to go 11–5 overall. The playoffs saw New England beat the Oakland Raiders in the Tuck Rule Game that closed Foxboro Stadium, then the Pittsburgh Steelers on the road; they ended the season with an upset of the heavily favored St. Louis Rams in Super Bowl XXXVI, 20–17.

The Patriots started off 2002 hot, winning their first three games to open up the new Gillette Stadium, but losing the next four. They ended with a 9–7 record, but a series of division and conference tiebreakers forced the Patriots out of the playoffs. It was one of only two times in the Brady–Belichick era that the Patriots missed the playoffs, and the only time with Brady as their starting quarterback. (They also missed the playoffs in 2008, when Matt Cassel replaced an injured Brady.)

=== 2003–2004: Back-to-back Super Bowls ===
Ahead of the 2003 season, Bill Belichick surprisingly released strong safety Lawyer Milloy five days before the 2003 season opener due to contract issues. As a replacement he signed hard-hitting enforcer Rodney Harrison, whose career appeared to be on the decline until that point. By the time Harrison retired in 2008, he held the NFL record for most sacks by a defensive back (30.5) and became the first defensive player to have 30 sacks and 30 interceptions. He also holds the Patriots' team record for postseason interceptions, with seven.

The Patriots lost their season opener 31–0 to the Buffalo Bills, who had signed Milloy days earlier. It was the worst loss of the Brady–Belichick era. However, what followed has been called one of the most successful two year stretches by a team in NFL history. The Patriots lost just three more games in 2003 and 2004 combined, culminating in back-to-back Super Bowl victories (Super Bowls XXXVIII over the Carolina Panthers and XXXIX over the Philadelphia Eagles). In 2004, they set the then-NFL record for consecutive victories, from Week 5, 2003 through Week 7, 2004. Until the 2023 Kansas City Chiefs, the 2003–04 Patriots were the last team to repeat as Super Bowl champions.

=== 2005–2006: Playoff disappointments ===
2005 was considered somewhat of a down year for the Patriots as they finished with a 10–6 record. The 2005 season featured injuries to many key players, including safety Rodney Harrison. Linebacker Tedy Bruschi also suffered a stroke and missed the beginning of the season before returning for the October 30 game against the Buffalo Bills. This forced the Patriots to start 45 different players throughout the season, an NFL record. Despite the injuries, the Patriots won the AFC East for the third straight time. They defeated the Jacksonville Jaguars in the Wild Card round, but lost to the Denver Broncos in the Divisional round, committing five turnovers.

In 2006, the Patriots came back strong, going 12–4 and winning the AFC East again. After beating the New York Jets and San Diego Chargers in the wildcard and divisional rounds, they squandered a 21–3 halftime lead against the Indianapolis Colts in the AFC Championship Game and lost 38–34.

=== 2007: 16–0 record, close to perfection ===
In 2007, the Patriots became the first and only team to win every regular season game since the NFL schedule was extended to 16 games. This season was also marked by the Spygate controversy, which resulted in Belichick receiving a $500,000 fine from the NFL. They outscored opposing teams by an average of 36–17. Brady won MVP for the first time in his career, throwing for 4800 yards and an NFL record 50 touchdowns. Wide receiver Randy Moss, traded to New England from the Oakland Raiders for a 4th round pick, caught an NFL record 23 touchdown passes that he still holds. After beating the Jacksonville Jaguars and San Diego Chargers in the playoffs, New England suffered their first defeat of the season at the hands of the New York Giants in Super Bowl XLII, 17–14, the same team New England had beaten in week 17 to cap the 16–0 record. Super Bowl XLII became renowned for the miraculous play made by Eli Manning and David Tyree, which became known as the Helmet Catch. With the loss, the Patriots failed to match the 1972 Miami Dolphins, the only team in NFL history to complete a perfect season (regular season and playoffs).

=== 2008–2010: Brady's injury and more playoff disappointments ===
The 2008 season started off with a disaster for the Patriots when Brady suffered a season-ending knee injury in Week 1 versus the Kansas City Chiefs. Despite the loss of Brady, Belichick coached the Patriots, with backup quarterback Matt Cassel under center, to a respectable 11–5 record. A series of division and conference tiebreakers made the 11–5 Miami Dolphins AFC East champions and allowed the 11–5 Baltimore Ravens to clinch the sixth and final conference playoff berth. The 2008 Patriots became the second 11-win team in NFL history to not make the playoffs (the other being the 1985 Denver Broncos).

The 2009 season was important for several reasons. They started the year with a comeback against the Buffalo Bills to go 1–0. In week 6 the Patriots beat the Tennessee Titans 59–0, tying the NFL record for the largest blowout since the 1970 merger. After a string of losses, including a heartbreaking road loss to the undefeated Indianapolis Colts, the Patriots finished 10–6 but lost to the Baltimore Ravens 33–14 in the Wild Card round. Brady had a comeback year, throwing for 4,300 yards and 28 touchdowns.

In 2010, the Patriots won the outright AFC East with a 14–2 record. Brady became the first unanimous NFL MVP, as well as the Offensive Player of the year. Despite all of the regular season hype, the Patriots failed to live up to it in the playoffs, losing in the Divisional Round to the division rival New York Jets 28–21.

=== 2011–2013: Super Bowl loss and consecutive losses in the AFC Championship Game ===
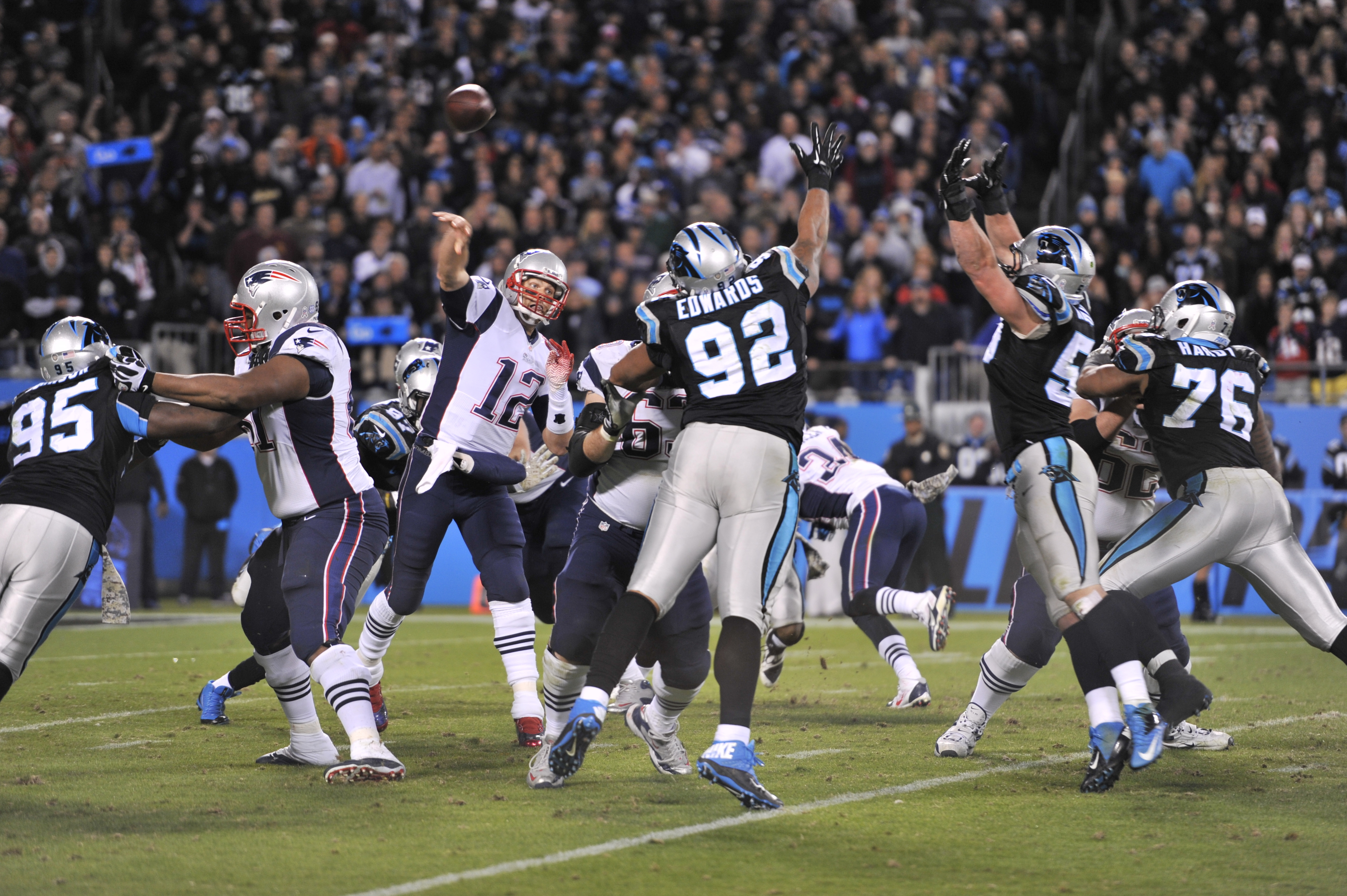
Brady attempts a pass against the Carolina Panthers in 2013

In 2011, the Patriots had another strong year, finishing with a 13–3 record, winning the AFC East, and making it to the Super Bowl. Tom Brady threw for 5,235 yards, still short of the NFL single-season record, which was set by Drew Brees in the same season. In Super Bowl XLVI against the New York Giants, Brady was pressured again and had difficulty scoring points. Another miracle play for the Giants offense made by Eli Manning on a pass to Mario Manningham allowed the Giants offense to take a late lead over the Patriots in the fourth quarter. The Giants won the game 21–17, marking the second time Brady and Belichick lost a Super Bowl to Manning and the Giants.

For the 2012 season, Brady threw for 4,827 yards and rushing for a career-high 4 touchdowns. After beating the Houston Texans in the Divisional round, they lost to the Baltimore Ravens in the AFC Championship Game 28–13.

Brady and Belichick led the 2013 Patriots team to a 12–4 record, earning the team a first round playoff bye week for the fourth consecutive year even despite Brady only throwing 25 touchdowns and adding 11 interceptions. The premier victory of the Patriots regular season came in Week 6 against the New Orleans Saints. Despite consecutive Patriots drives ending in a 3-and-out and Brady throwing a seemingly game-ending interception with 2:16 left in the fourth quarter, the Patriots defense forced the Saints to punt with 1:13 left in the game. Brady then led the Patriots to score with only 5 seconds left, throwing a touchdown to Kenbrell Thompkins in the corner of the end zone. In the playoffs, the Patriots easily made it to the AFC Championship Game, where they faced the Denver Broncos and their record-breaking offense. In another Tom Brady–Peyton Manning rivalry game, the Broncos won 26–16.

=== 2014: Fourth Super Bowl victory ===
The Patriots began the 2014 season with a rough 2–2 record, including an embarrassing loss of 41–14 to the Kansas City Chiefs in Week 4. Many sports writers were beginning to call for the end of the Patriots dynasty, which had not won a Super Bowl since the 2004 season. Still, the Patriots bounced back and went 10–2 down the stretch to finish the season 12–4. After coming back from two 14 point deficits to beat the Baltimore Ravens in the divisional round, the Patriots routed the Indianapolis Colts 45–7 in the AFC Championship Game, earning their sixth Super Bowl appearance since 2001.

In Super Bowl XLIX, after throwing two interceptions and leaving his team down by 10 points in the 4th quarter, Brady led the Patriots on two touchdown drives against the Seattle Seahawks. The Patriots capped off the comeback with a touchdown pass to Julian Edelman with just over two minutes remaining in regulation. On the ensuing Seahawks drive, quarterback Russell Wilson threw a deep pass to wide receiver Jermaine Kearse that was initially deflected by cornerback Malcolm Butler. Kearse juggled the ball on his chest and caught it, giving Seattle a first down on the 5 yard line. Color commentator Cris Collinsworth compared the acrobatic catch to David Tyree's iconic Helmet Catch against the Patriots in Super Bowl XLII. On the next play, running back Marshawn Lynch rushed to the 1 yard line, where he was tackled by Dont'a Hightower. Then with 26 seconds left in the game, Wilson's pass for Ricardo Lockette was intercepted by undrafted rookie cornerback Malcolm Butler on the goal line. The Patriots prevailed, 28–24.

=== 2015: AFC Championship loss ===
The Patriots had a hot start to the 2015 season, winning their first ten games. A series of injuries, including Julian Edelman, Rob Gronkowski, Brandon LaFell, Dion Lewis, and at one point, the entire offensive line, led to the Patriots to lose four of their next six games. After beating the Kansas City Chiefs in the Divisional round, Brady faced the vaunted Denver Broncos defense in the AFC Championship Game. The Patriots lost, 20–18 in what was Brady's last ever matchup with Peyton Manning in their rivalry, as Manning retired from the league following their Super Bowl victory over the Carolina Panthers.

=== 2016: Fifth Super Bowl victory ===
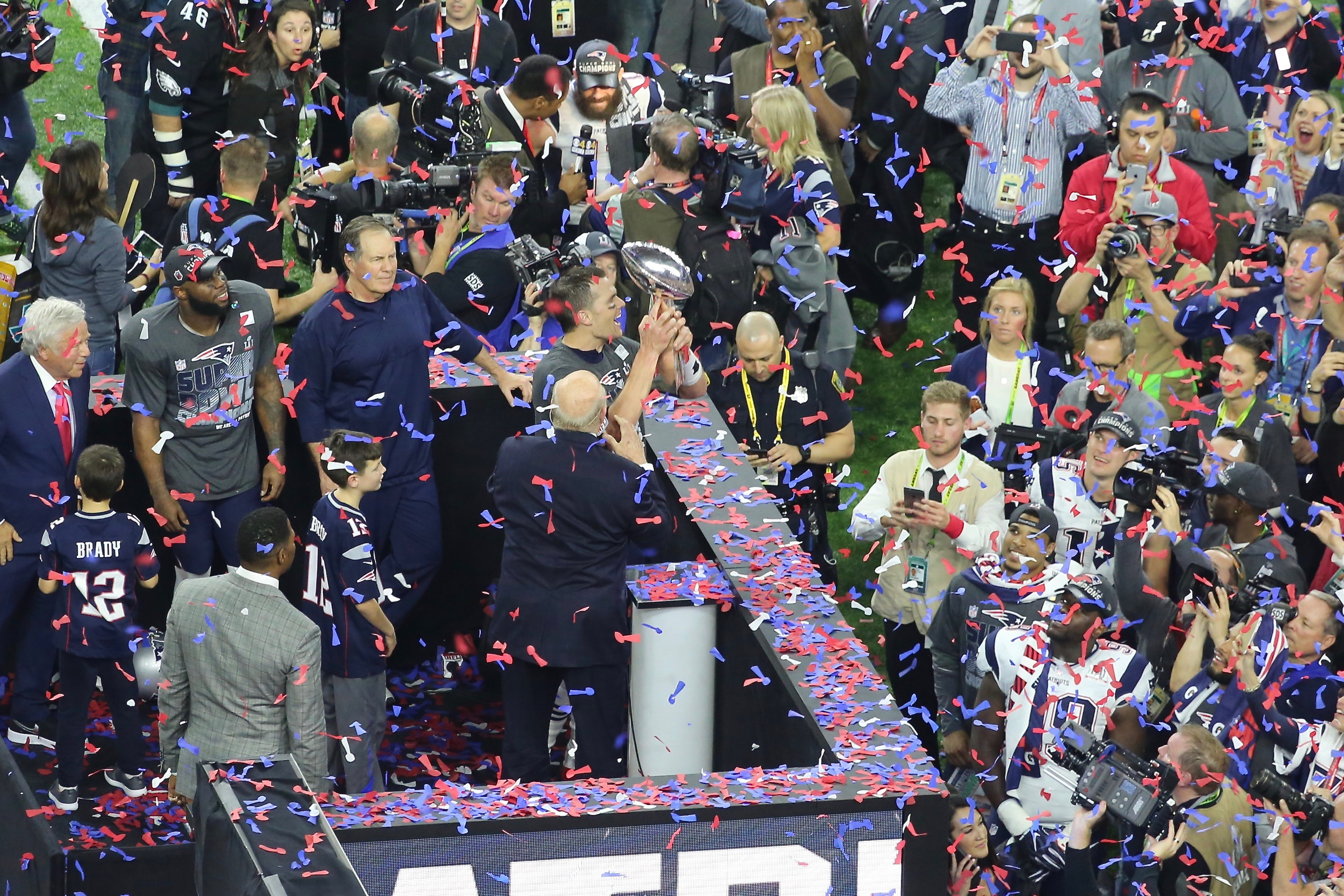
Belichick and Brady on stage for the Lombardi Trophy presentation after Super Bowl LI

As a result of his involvement in the Deflategate scandal, Brady was suspended for the first four games of the 2016 season. Belichick supported Brady during this controversy, stating that he believed his quarterback. Brady continously claimed that he had done nothing wrong and was not aware of anything. With backups Jimmy Garoppolo and Jacoby Brissett, the Patriots started the year 3–1. With Brady back in Week 5, the Patriots lost just one game the rest of the season and dominated on the way to a 14–2 finish. After beating the Houston Texans and the Pittsburgh Steelers in the playoffs, the Patriots, who finished as the #3 scoring offense and the #1 scoring defense faced the Atlanta Falcons and their top-ranked scoring offense and 27th-ranked scoring defense in Super Bowl LI.

Early on, the Patriots' defense could not stop the high-powered Falcons offense. Brady was inconsistent, off on his throws, and threw an interception to Robert Alford that was returned for a touchdown, the first pick-six in Brady's postseason career. By halftime, the score was 21–3. The Falcons scored again in the third quarter to make the score 28–3, a 25-point deficit. In the previous 50 Super Bowls, the largest deficit ever overcome was 10 points. The Patriots scored 31 unanswered points to win the Super Bowl 34–28 in overtime. It was the first Super Bowl to go to overtime, as well as the largest deficit overcome. Brady won his fourth Super Bowl MVP after setting a Super Bowl record with 466 passing yards. 30 Super Bowl records were broken or tied in Super Bowl LI.

=== 2017: Super Bowl loss ===
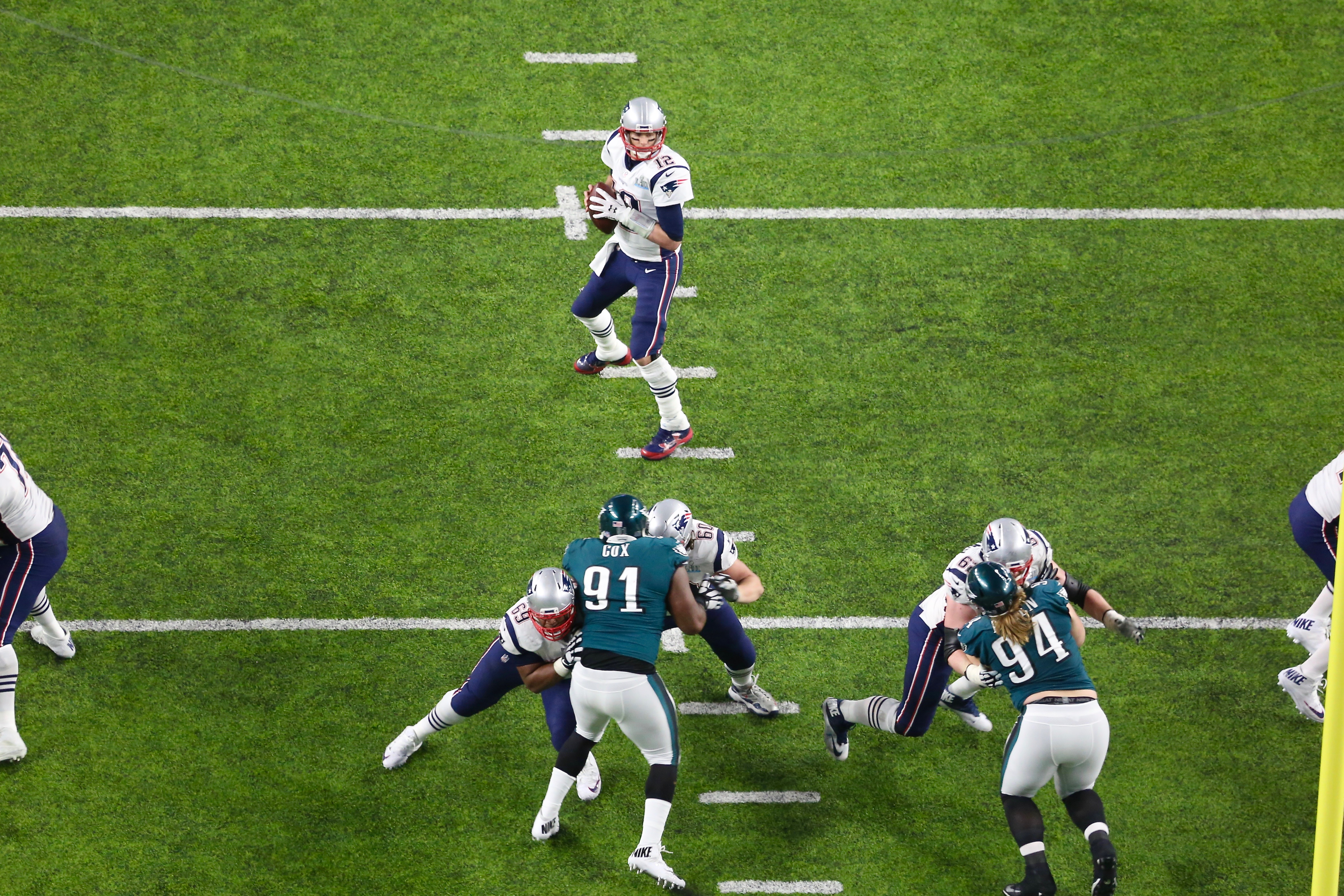
Tom Brady drops back to pass in the second half of Super Bowl LII (Brian Allen/VOA)

The Patriots started off the 2017 season slow yet again, going 2–2 before going 11–1 down the stretch to win another AFC East title and claiming the first seed in the AFC. Brady became the oldest MVP in the NFL, at 40. He also became the oldest quarterback to lead the NFL in passing with, 4,577 yards. After defeating the Tennessee Titans and Jacksonville Jaguars in the playoffs, they faced backup quarterback Nick Foles and the high-powered Philadelphia Eagles in Super Bowl LII. The Patriots were aiming to be the first team to win back-to-back Super Bowls since they themselves won back-to-back from 2003 to 2004. In a high-scoring shootout, Brady's attempt to lead the Patriots to another comeback victory late in the fourth quarter was stopped when Eagles defensive end Brandon Graham strip sacked Brady and the Eagles recovered the ball, securing a Patriots defeat, 41–33. Brady set another Super Bowl record with 505 passing yards, breaking the record he had set the year before.

=== 2018: Sixth Super Bowl victory ===
The Patriots drew much criticism in 2018 after losing to the Jacksonville Jaguars and the winless Detroit Lions in the first three weeks; both teams ended below a .500 winning percentage for the season. The Patriots bounced back with a string of wins, including a Sunday Night thriller at home against the undefeated Kansas City Chiefs, who were led by young quarterback Patrick Mahomes; Mahomes threw over 5,000 yards and 50 touchdowns for the season and won the NFL MVP award.

In Week 14 against the Miami Dolphins, the Patriots led with 7 seconds left in the game. On the last play, Dolphins quarterback Ryan Tannehill passed the ball to Kenny Stills, who lateraled the ball to DeVante Parker, who in turn tossed the ball to Kenyan Drake. Drake then ran the remaining 53 yards for the touchdown with no time on the clock, immortalizing the play in NFL lore as the Miracle in Miami.

For the first time in almost a decade, the Patriots finished the season with more than four losses, at 11–5, but secured the AFC East for a record 10th consecutive time and the AFC's second seed, behind the 12–4 Chiefs. After handily defeating the Los Angeles Chargers by a score of 41–28 in the Divisional round, the Patriots faced Mahomes and the vaunted Chiefs offense in the AFC Championship Game. After leading 14–0 at halftime, the Patriots fought a comeback by the Chiefs and forced the game to overtime at 31–31. On the first drive of OT the Patriots quickly moved downfield through critical third down completions to Julian Edelman and Rob Gronkowski, setting up a touchdown run by Rex Burkhead. Belichick and Brady earned their third straight trip to the Super Bowl and their ninth overall, more than any other coach/quarterback duo.

In Super Bowl LIII, the Patriots' stiff defense held the high-scoring Los Angeles Rams offense to three points all game, sacking quarterback Jared Goff four times, intercepting him once, and allowing only a 57.6 passer rating. The Patriots' offense started slow, with Brady throwing an early interception. They came back late in the fourth quarter, with Brady lobbing a 29-yard pass to Gronkowski, capped by a two-yard touchdown run by rookie Sony Michel. On the Patriots' next drive, kicker Stephen Gostkowski cemented the win, 13–3. It is the lowest-scoring Super Bowl ever, and Brady and Belichick's sixth and final Super Bowl win together. This victory also made Belichick the first head coach in NFL history to win six Super Bowl championships.

=== 2019: The end of the era ===
The Patriots started 8–0, but went 4–4 down the stretch to finish 12–4, including a stunning Week 17 loss to the Miami Dolphins at home, coached at the time by former Patriots assistant Brian Flores, who had coached for the Patriots organization from 2004 to 2018. The loss, which was their first home loss to the Dolphins since 2008, cost New England a first-round playoff bye, forcing them to play a wild card game for the first time since 2009. They faced the Tennessee Titans, coached by ex-Patriots linebacker and former Brady teammate Mike Vrabel, who played for the Patriots from 2001 to 2008. The Titans shocked the Patriots 20–13 at Gillette Stadium, avenging their 2003 and 2017 Divisional round defeats at the same venue. This also marked the first time the Patriots had not advanced to the AFC Championship Game since 2010 and was the Titans' first win at New England since 1993, when the club was known as the Houston Oilers. Brady's last pass as a Patriot was a pick-six to former teammate Logan Ryan, who joined the Titans in 2017 after spending his first four years with the Patriots and winning two Super Bowls (XLIX, LI).

== Aftermath ==
Brady joined the Tampa Bay Buccaneers on March 17, 2020, separating the Belichick and Brady duo, while the Patriots signed ex-Carolina Panthers quarterback and 2015 MVP Cam Newton as their quarterback for the 2020 season. Brady and the Buccaneers won Super Bowl LV in his first season in Tampa Bay, while Belichick, Newton, and Brian Hoyer, finished with the Patriots' first sub-.500 season in twenty years at 7–9. Following the season, the Patriots would draft quarterback Mac Jones with the 15th-overall pick in the 2021 NFL draft. Newton, Hoyer, Jarrett Stidham, and Jones competed for the starting quarterback position during training camp, with Jones winning the job.

During week 4 of the 2021 season, Brady's Buccaneers visited the Patriots. Tampa Bay narrowly won the game 19–17 off a missed field goal in the final seconds from Patriots kicker Nick Folk. In the week leading up to the matchup, both Brady and Belichick spoke fondly of their time with one another in the press, with Brady calling Belichick a "great mentor" and Belichick calling Brady a "special player". Patriots owner Robert Kraft greeted Brady outside of the locker room hours before the game, and the two exchanged warm words. Brady received a standing ovation at Gillette Stadium when he took the field for warmups, with Patriots fans chanting his name. The stadium's video screens showed a tribute video shortly before kickoff highlighting Brady's accomplishments during his 20-year tenure with the team. While fans gave Brady a warm reception before the game, the cheers turned to boos when he took the field with the Buccaneers offense.

During the game, Brady officially surpassed Drew Brees for the most career passing yards in NFL history. With the victory over his former team, Brady became the fourth quarterback in NFL history to record a win against all 32 current teams in the league, joining Brett Favre, Peyton Manning, and Drew Brees. In addition, he became the sixth quarterback to have a victory against every incumbent NFL franchise after Fran Tarkenton and Joe Montana, as the league only had 28 teams during the latter two's respective tenures.

Immediately after the Buccaneers victory, Brady and Belichick shared a quick embrace on the field before Brady greeted his former teammates and other members of the Patriots organization. Though fans criticized Belichick for his lack of warmth displayed towards his former quarterback, it was later reported that the two privately spoke at length in the Buccaneers locker room following the game.

Brady's return to New England became the second most-watched Sunday Night Football game on NBC. The broadcast also scored a 43.8 rating and 70 share in Boston, making it the city's second-biggest audience for a regular season Patriots game after New England clinched their undefeated season against the New York Giants in 2007.

Brady announced his retirement from football on February 1, 2022, but later reversed course. He retired again the next year on February 1, 2023, saying on social media that this was "for good." On September 10, Brady returned to Gillette Stadium for the first time as a non-player. In the presence of his family, he was honored by Kraft, Belichick, and the Patriots organization. In his speech, Brady declared that he was a "Patriot for life".

On January 11, 2024, Belichick and the Patriots mutually agreed to part ways. In his final four seasons following Brady's departure from the Patriots, Belichick went 29–38 (0.433). A 10-part docuseries covering the Brady–Belichick era, titled The Dynasty, aired on Apple TV+ in early 2024.

Long Snapper Joe Cardona was released by the team in April 2025. As the last survivor of the Super Bowl LIII roster, his departure was seen as a symbolic ending of the Brady-Belichick era heading into the 2025 season, which was ironically a season that saw the team reach its first Super Bowl after the Brady-Belichick era under new head coach Mike Vrabel, a stalwart of the first part of the era.

== The "Patriot Way" ==
According to many writers and analysts, the culture that Bill Belichick upheld in New England, dubbed the "Patriot Way", helped to sustain the team's success. Belichick has been known to be punctual and attentive to detail. Players such as Brady, All-Pro Safety Devin McCourty, and longtime Patriot Julian Edelman were known to keep the culture around New England alive. For example, Brady consistently took pay cuts despite his elite performance.

In 2017, Brady's cap value was only $14 million. Moreover, the total cash spent on Brady in 2017 was a mere $1 million. Despite such low pay, Brady played at an elite level and set several NFL records for a 40-year-old quarterback, culminating in an MVP award and a record-breaking 505 passing yards in a losing effort in Super Bowl LII. When asked why he accepted pay cuts and a salary below market value, Brady replied, "I think the thing I've always felt for me in my life, winning has been a priority. And my wife [model Gisele Bündchen] makes a lot of money. I'm a little smarter than you think... Actually, it's a salary cap. You can only spend so much and the more that one guy gets is less for others. And for a competitive advantage standpoint, I like to get a lot of good players around me." Brady's willingness to take pay cuts allowed the Patriots to spend that money elsewhere on additional skill players. A famous example of this was in the signing of Hall of Fame wide receiver Randy Moss in 2007. According to Patriots executives, Brady restructured his contract to allow the Patriots to acquire the cap space needed to sign Moss. Moss went on to set the NFL single-season receiving touchdown record.

Belichick's disciplinarianism was shown with running back Jonas Gray. In Week 11 of the 2014 season against the Indianapolis Colts, Gray rushed for 201 yards and scored four touchdowns, a franchise record. But he was late to practice the next week, something Belichick is known not to tolerate. Gray was active in only five more games for the Patriots, and was released less than a year later.

During Belichick's tenure, the philosophy in making personnel decisions and in game planning focused on the "team" concept, stressing preparation, strong work ethic, versatility, and lack of individual ego.

- Running game: the Erhardt-Perkins system traditionally had a reputation of being a smash-mouth offense that maximizes a team's time of possession and does not frequently call upon its running backs to serve as receivers. Erhardt often said, "throw to score, run to win." This may have been especially true during the years Bill Parcells ran this system as the head coach of the New York Giants.
- Passing game: the addition of Randy Moss and Wes Welker to the Patriots offense in 2007, the Patriots placed an emphasis on a wide open passing attack (with record setting results).
- Innovations: around 2011, Bill Belichick increasingly adopted an up-tempo, no-huddle offense for his team. In 2014, Belichick implemented creative substitution tactics in the playoffs versus the Baltimore Ravens and Indianapolis Colts. On three plays against the Ravens, the Patriots used four offensive linemen, but had a skill-position player (RB Shane Vereen twice, TE Michael Hoomanawanui once) in the position of an offensive lineman; in each case, Vereen and Hoomanawanui reported as an ineligible receiver, but split wide on the line, confusing the Ravens on which players to cover, similar to the A-11 offense. Taken by surprise, Ravens head coach John Harbaugh protested, but was told by the NFL that the formations were legal, and had been reported properly before each play. After the season, the NFL imposed rule changes prohibiting such substitutions; players who wear eligible numbers at ineligible positions must now place themselves closer to the center.
- Special teams: the Patriots' special teams strategies have not been as widely studied. Because of the team's offensive success, the team ranks near the bottom of the league in number of punts executed. Of note, the team has consistently employed left-footed punters (including one, Chris Hanson, who could kick with both legs); there has been no discernible statistical advantage to doing so, and the hypothesis that the ball's spin in the opposing direction makes it more difficult to field has never been verified. The Patriots have shown willingness to exploit some of the more esoteric special teams rules; they considered a fair catch kick during Super Bowl LI (opting against it because it was deemed too risky) and have used the drop kick several times: scoring the only known point off a drop kick in the modern era in the last game of the 2006 regular season and using the maneuver at least twice (both unsuccessfully) on onside kick attempts, in 2011 and 2015.

The team culture under Belichick, dubbed the "Patriot Way", included:

- A self-critical, perfectionist, and militaristic approach
- An emphasis on team, equality among players and lack of individual ego
- A strong work ethic, intelligence and high level of focus and preparation for each individual game
- Versatile players, able to play multiple positions
- Multiple schemes intended to take advantage of their opponent's weaknesses

Since 2000, the philosophy in making personnel decisions and in game planning has focused on the "team" concept, stressing preparation, strong work ethic, versatility, and lack of individual ego. This approach, which has led to six Super Bowl victories under Belichick, was analyzed in the 2004 book Patriot Reign as well as the 2021 documentary miniseries Man in the Arena.

For example, in Super Bowl XXXVI, the Patriots' defense used an aggressive bump and run nickel and dime package instead of their base 3–4 to disrupt the timing of the highly touted Air Coryell system employed by the Rams under Mike Martz (also known as "The Greatest Show on Turf"). This modifiable aspect of the Patriots system is in stark contrast to simpler systems like the Tampa 2 defense, in which the same scheme is often run repeatedly with the emphasis being on execution rather than on flexibility.

In his book How Football Explains America, Sal Paolantonio noted the many parallels between the Patriots' philosophy and military training taught at West Point. This is likely the result of Bill Parcells' having coached at West Point for four years and Bill Belichick's close ties with the Naval Academy.

== Controversies ==
Spygate was an incident during the 2007 NFL season, when the Patriots were disciplined by the league for videotaping New York Jets' defensive coaches' signals from an unauthorized location. Videotaping opposing coaches is not illegal in the NFL de jure, but there are designated areas allowed by the league to do such taping. Because the Patriots were instead videotaping the Jets' coaches from their own sideline, NFL Commissioner Roger Goodell deemed it to be in violation of league rules, stating that the act represented a calculated and deliberate attempt to avoid long-standing rules designed to encourage fair play and promote honest competition.

After an investigation, the NFL fined Belichick $500,000 (the maximum allowed by the league and the largest fine ever imposed on a coach in league history) for his role in the incident, fined the Patriots $250,000, and docked the team their first-round selection in the 2008 NFL Draft. After the original incident, several other allegations were made against the Patriots filming opposing teams.

Deflategate was a controversy involving the allegation that Brady ordered the deliberate deflating of footballs used in the Patriots' victory against the Indianapolis Colts in the 2014–15 AFC Championship Game. The controversy resulted in Brady being suspended for four games, the Patriots being fined $1 million and losing two draft picks, and saw the NFL later change the procedure for monitoring football pressure.

For his alleged part in the scandal, Brady was originally suspended by the league for four games of the 2015 regular season, but a federal judge later vacated his suspension and allowed Brady to resume his playing duties for the entirety of the 2015 season. However, the 2nd U.S. Circuit Court of Appeals reinstated Brady's four-game suspension, which became effective for the 2016 regular season. After serving his suspension, the Patriots would go on to win that season's Super Bowl LI.
