= Patriot Reign =

Book about the New England Patriots

- Hardcover, 1st edition cover
- Author: Michael Holley
- Cover artist: AP Photo by Jim Rogash
- Language: English
- Subject: Tom Brady, Bill Belichick, Robert Kraft, Jonathan Kraft, Scott Pioli, Bill Parcells, New England Patriots, National Football League, and so forth.
- Genre: Sports coverage, analysis and history
- Publisher: HarperCollins
- Publication date: 2004
- Publication place: United States
- Media type: hardcover, Trade Paperback
- Pages: 240 / ???
- ISBN: 0-06-075794-9
- OCLC: 56096413
- Dewey Decimal: 796.332/092 B 22
- LC Class: GV939.B45 H65 2004

Patriot Reign is a best-selling book by The Boston Globe/The New York Times sports writer Michael Holley resulting from two years he was given unprecedented access to the inner sanctums of the world champion New England Patriots football operations, as they worked to turn a season of good luck into a legitimate contender of a team. The book was published in 2004 by the William Morrow subsidiary of Harper-Collins books.

Holley spent his days tracking the behind the scenes operations in the New England Patriots organization between their first and second Super Bowl wins, sitting in on meetings, and never being asked to exclude anything. Prohibited from nothing, Holley roamed the managerial meetings and team areas normally closed to the press, and conducted in depth interviews with scouts, coaches, and other Patriots insiders, up to and including owner Robert Kraft, and his son, President of the Patriots, Jonathan Kraft.

Holley followed the team, day-to-day, from within the organization for nearly two full seasons as coach and de facto general manager Bill Belichick resumed the building of a model NFL franchise. The team's progression was interrupted by the Patriots' unexpected victory over the St Louis Rams — nicknamed "The Greatest Show on Turf" — in Super Bowl XXXVI. Shortly after the surprise victory, Holley pitched his book concept to Belichick. The idea was rubber stamped by the Krafts, and Holley took a leave of absence from his work at the Globe to immerse himself in the New England Patriots.

In February 2009, the book was cited by syndicated radio talk-show host Rush Limbaugh. Limbaugh discussed the passages in the book dealing with Belichick's philosophy that he found to be instructive on his program.

== Summary ==
=== Belichick's background ===
The first few chapters of the work set the stage and introduce the main Patriots 'characters' and their resumes. Rather than biographical minutiae, the book focuses on matters which would be most of interest to fans. The book begins by covering the early experiences of Bill Belichick as a young coach including his tutoring under his late father, Steven Belichick, a lifelong scout and coach for the United States Naval Academy football program whom he began to help "breaking down film" and recording (analyzing upcoming opponent) plays as early as age eleven. Belichick was so skilled at film analysis that when he took a position as a graduate intern where this was his job with the Baltimore Colts, his salary was doubled after only a few weeks.

The book shifts to focus on the early coaching career of Belichick (from age 23) as he went from graduate intern to jobs as various positions coach under four different coaches in three different football organizations including Ted Marchibroda in Baltimore and Rick Forzano of the Detroit Lions.

Holley all but ignores Belichick's ten years or so with the New York Giants as defensive co-ordinator and (eventually) as assistant coach — where he established himself as an important defensive mind — only touching on those years in passing. Only cursory mentions are made throughout the book of the achievements of Belichick's defenses, and the dominating Giants' teams he helped construct..

The book goes back to when Belichick was nearly hired as the head coach of the Phoenix Cardinals in 1987 before that team moved from St Louis.

=== Belichick's tenure in Cleveland ===
Patriot Reign addresses the era four years later when Belichick would coach the Cleveland Browns, from 1991–1995. At the time, Belichick was the youngest NFL head coach, and one considered average at the time. The media disliked Belichick's policies of restricting access to the team after they'd enjoyed years of free access. Holley relates the Cleveland press's changing views about Belichick, and that he "may be worthy of respect", as he had taken a 2-14 team to 11-5 and the AFC playoffs in just three years.

Holley covers the Browns' departure from Cleveland to Baltimore, that left Browns owner Art Modell the most hated man in Cleveland — so much so that, only a few years prior, Modell wouldn't attend the funeral of a long time friend and associate, for fear of his life.

Holley addresses mistakes that Belichick admits he made with the press, Browns' management and the eccentric owner Art Modell in his first position as head coach. This section reveals that Belichick resents the press's perception that he had been a Parcells disciple—which Belichick states is disrespectful of the other great coaches he worked under prior to working under Parcells.

The following chapters highlight the author's opinion of Belichick as a complex man, cerebral coach, teacher and parent. The book highlights Belichick's penchant for levity and storytelling, while being profane as is needed. This part of his history concludes with how Belichick parted ways with owner Art Modell and did not follow the team in the 1996–97 off season to Baltimore where it was reincarnated as today's Baltimore Ravens and enters near-contemporary history when Belichick first joined the New England Patriots.

=== Robert Kraft and Bill Parcells ===
The book continues, focusing on 1996, when Belichick was hired immediately as by his old boss Bill Parcells to be the Patriots' defensive coordinator. (Belichick had worked under Parcells previously with the New York Giants.) The passage exposes the complex interpersonal dynamics governing the management interactions of the 1996 Patriots, the relationships between the Krafts and Parcells, and exposes key points in their characters, philosophies, and history.

As the new assistant head coach for the New England Patriots, Belichick soon found he'd become the ombudsman to the novice owners Robert Kraft and his son Jonathan, who had a stormy relationship with Parcells, whom they inherited when Kraft bought the team. It was noted that there was "a history" between the owners and Parcells that was leading to a deterioration in the team's relationship.

The book then pauses to give a football background history of Robert Kraft, and then moving tangentially into the Krafts's business history, touches on Kraft's financial evaluation that the Patriots could not be successful economically as a franchise without also owning the stadium and its revenues. Kraft couldn't afford to buy the Patriots in 1988, but when former Patriots owner Billy Sullivan sold the team to Victor Kiam, Kraft prevented Sullivan and Foxboro Stadium from going bankrupt by purchasing the stadium, making him the team's landlord. This positioned Kraft — a lifelong Patriots fan — to purchase the team in 1994.

The reader learns how former Patriots owner James Orthwein, unable to move the team as he could not break the long term lease with Foxboro Stadium, put the team up for sale in 1994; this time Kraft was able to outbid all others for the team, even though he had to pay a large price for the team, $200,000,000. With the purchase, Kraft inherited a strong-minded head coach with whom he had no relationship.

Holley next sketches in how the Krafts' business acumen improved the team's revenues, and established an ever-increasing fan base (in no small part by ending the dubious practice of blocking out local television coverage when there were seats available) which has resulted in consecutively increasing sales every year since, and a sold-out stadium since the 1996 season, with a waiting list for season tickets that goes for years.

Despite the team's marketing successes in 1996, the relationship between Kraft and Parcells was strained, and got worse with time. The new owners, with their net worth on the line, were unwilling to give a carte blanche to Parcells to spend on football operations. The Krafts believed in giving management plenty of space, but not a blank check without occasional questions and answers.

Parcells felt the owner was interfering with his prerogatives and what was needed to run a successful winning football franchise, especially in light of the new NFL salary cap which took effect in 1994. The result was a stalemate that led to Belichick — as newly hired Assistant Head Coach — mediating between the two in the 1996 season. Prior to the Patriots' appearance in Super Bowl XXXI, rumors dominated the sports media that Parcells intended to leave the Patriots after the Super Bowl, despite the fact Parcells was under contract through the 1997 season. These news reports were categorized as distracting and disruptive to the team in the weeks leading up to the Super Bowl.

The team president of the Patriots (Jonathan Kraft) is quoted in the book as saying "It was a very, very strange time, and when you are not an expert at this business—you know we were still very new to the business—it can be educational. Big Bill (ie. Parcells) had kept us in the dark on a lot of things. He probably misled us on some things. And we didn't know how to go about questioning it."

After leaving New England, Parcells and Belichick were hired as the head coach and defensive coordinator for the New York Jets. Belichick was presumed to be the heir apparent to take over the Jets head coaching position after Parcells departure.

But Belichick's tenure at the Jets helm was to be short lived. He infamously resigned after just one day as the team's head coach. Holley reveals Belichick's resignation was one sentence, which simply read, "I resign as HC of the NYJ", and was hand-written on a sheet of loose-leaf paper.
