= Doug Evans (American football) =

American football player (born 1970)

No. 33, 39
- Position: Cornerback

Personal information
- Born: May 13, 1970 (age 56); Shreveport, Louisiana, U.S.
- Listed height: 6 ft 1 in (1.85 m)
- Listed weight: 188 lb (85 kg)

Career information
- High school: Haynesville (Haynesville, Louisiana)
- College: Louisiana Tech
- NFL draft: 1993: 6th round, 141st overall pick

Career history
- Green Bay Packers (1993–1997); Carolina Panthers (1998–2001); Seattle Seahawks (2002–2003); Detroit Lions (2003)

Awards and highlights
- Super Bowl champion (XXXI); Second-team All-Pro (1997); Second Team All-IFA (1992)

Career NFL statistics
- Tackles: 623
- Interceptions: 28
- Sacks: 6
- Stats at Pro Football Reference

Douglas Edwards Evans (born May 13, 1970) is an American former professional football player who was a cornerback in the National Football League (NFL). He played college football for the Louisiana Tech Bulldogs and was selected by the Green Bay Packers in the sixth round of the 1993 NFL draft with the 141st overall pick. He won Super Bowl XXXI with the 1996 Green Bay Packers against the New England Patriots. Evans also played for the Carolina Panthers, the Seattle Seahawks, and the Detroit Lions. In 2001, he set a Panthers franchise record with 8 interceptions.
