= Frank Winters =

American football player (born 1964)

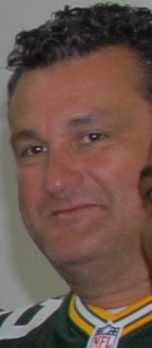
- Winters in 2015

No. 64, 69, 65, 52
- Positions: Center, guard

Personal information
- Born: January 23, 1964 (age 62); Hoboken, New Jersey, U.S.
- Listed height: 6 ft 3 in (1.91 m)
- Listed weight: 305 lb (138 kg)

Career information
- High school: Emerson (Union City, New Jersey)
- College: Western Illinois
- NFL draft: 1987: 10th round, 276th overall pick

Career history
- Cleveland Browns (1987–1988); New York Giants (1989); Kansas City Chiefs (1990–1991); Green Bay Packers (1992–2002)

Awards and highlights
- Super Bowl champion (XXXI); Pro Bowl (1996); Green Bay Packers Hall of Fame; First-team All-Gateway (1986)

Career NFL statistics
- Games played: 231
- Games started: 147
- Fumble recoveries: 5
- Stats at Pro Football Reference

Frank Mitchell Winters (born January 23, 1964) is an American former professional football player who was a center in the National Football League (NFL) for the Cleveland Browns, New York Giants, Kansas City Chiefs, and Green Bay Packers. He played college football for the Western Illinois Leathernecks.

== Early life ==
Frank Mitchell Winters was born in Hoboken, New Jersey. He lived in Union City, and played football at Emerson High School. Winters played American football at Western Illinois University, a Division I-AA school.

== Professional career ==
Pre-draft measurables
Height	Weight	Arm length	Hand span	40-yard dash	10-yard split	20-yard split	20-yard shuttle	Vertical jump	Broad jump	Bench press
6 ft 3 in (1.91 m)	273 lb (124 kg)	32 1/4 in (0.82 m)	9 1/4 in (0.23 m)	5.10 s	1.79 s	2.98 s	4.79 s	25.5 in (0.65 m)	8 ft 4 in (2.54 m)	20 reps
All values from NFL Combine

Winters was selected in the tenth round of the 1987 NFL draft by the Cleveland Browns. He spent two seasons with the team before playing for the Giants in 1989 and the Chiefs in 1990 and 1991. With all three teams, he primarily served as a long snapper.

Winters was the Packers' starting center serving for eight straight seasons (1993–2000). He played in the Pro Bowl and also earned USA Today All-Pro honors in 1999. His nickname was "Old Bag of Donuts".

On July 18, 2008, Winters was inducted into the Green Bay Packers Hall of Fame.
