= Super Bowl XXXI =

1997 National Football League championship game

New England Patriots (2) (AFC) (11–5)	Green Bay Packers (1) (NFC) (13–3)
21	35
Head coach: Bill Parcells	Head coach: Mike Holmgren
	1	2	3	4	Total
NE	14	0	7	0	21
GB	10	17	8	0	35
- Date: January 26, 1997
- Kickoff time: 5:25 p.m. CST (UTC-6)
- Stadium: Louisiana Superdome; New Orleans, Louisiana
- MVP: Desmond Howard, return specialist
- Favorite: Packers by 14
- Referee: Gerald Austin
- Attendance: 72,301

Ceremonies
- National anthem: Luther Vandross
- Coin toss: Past Super Bowl winning coaches: Hank Stram, Mike Ditka, Tom Flores, Tom Landry, Chuck Noll, George Seifert
- Halftime show: The Blues Brothers, James Brown, and ZZ Top

TV in the United States
- Network: Fox
- Announcers: Pat Summerall, John Madden, Ron Pitts, and Bill Maas
- Nielsen ratings: 43.3 (est. 87.87 million viewers)
- Market share: 65
- Cost of 30-second commercial: $1.2 million

Radio in the United States
- Network: Westwood One
- Announcers: Howard David and Matt Millen

Super Bowl XXXI was an American football game between the American Football Conference (AFC) champion New England Patriots and the National Football Conference (NFC) champion Green Bay Packers to decide the National Football League (NFL) champion for the 1996 season. The Packers defeated the Patriots 35–21 to win their third Super Bowl, which was their twelfth NFL championship in franchise history and first since Super Bowl II in 1968. It was also the last in a run of 13 straight Super Bowl victories by the NFC over the AFC. The game was played on January 26, 1997, at the Louisiana Superdome in New Orleans, Louisiana.

This Super Bowl featured two clubs that had recently returned to competitiveness. After 24 mostly dismal seasons since Vince Lombardi left, the Packers' fortunes turned after head coach Mike Holmgren and quarterback Brett Favre joined the team in 1992. After four losing seasons, the Patriots' rise began in 1993 when Bill Parcells was hired as head coach, and the team drafted quarterback Drew Bledsoe. Under their respective head coaches and quarterbacks, Green Bay posted an NFC-best 13–3 regular season record in 1996, while New England advanced to their second Super Bowl after recording an 11–5 record in what would be their first of eleven Super Bowl appearances under owner Robert Kraft.

The game began with the teams combining for 24 first-quarter points, the most in Super Bowl history. The Packers then scored 17 unanswered points in the second quarter, including Favre's then-Super Bowl record 81-yard touchdown pass to wide receiver Antonio Freeman. In the third quarter, the Patriots cut the lead to 27–21 due to running back Curtis Martin's 18-yard rushing touchdown. But on the ensuing kickoff, Desmond Howard returned the ball a then-Super Bowl record 99 yards for a touchdown. The score proved to be the last one, as both teams' defenses took over the rest of the game. Howard became the first special teams player ever to be named Super Bowl MVP. He gained a total of 154 kickoff return yards, and also recorded a then-Super Bowl record 90 punt return yards, thus tying the then-Super Bowl records of total return yards (244) and combined net yards gained (244).

This was the first Super Bowl broadcast by Fox under its first contract to carry NFL games. By a large margin it was the highest-rated program aired in Fox's history at the time.

== Background ==
=== Host selection process ===
NFL owners voted to award Super Bowl XXXI to New Orleans during their October 26, 1993, meeting in Chicago. The bidding process was scheduled to award two Super Bowl sites (XXXI and XXXII), the first time that multiple hosts were selected at the same meeting since XXIII and XXIV were voted on in 1985. This was the eighth time that New Orleans hosted the game, and fifth time it would be played in the Superdome.

Four cities entered the bidding for the two games: New Orleans (Superdome), San Diego (Jack Murphy Stadium), Los Angeles/Pasadena (Rose Bowl), and Tampa (Tampa Stadium). The New Orleans representatives bid only on XXXI, Los Angeles only bid on XXXII, while San Diego and Tampa made themselves available for both games. Rules required a candidate to receive a 3/4 vote (21 of 28 owners) in order to win the bidding. If no winner received the necessary votes after three rounds, the fourth round would revert to a simple majority.

Tampa was eliminated during the balloting, leaving New Orleans and San Diego as the two finalists for XXXI. New Orleans, an overwhelming favorite going into the meeting, was picked. San Diego would manage to win the vote for XXXII.

=== New England Patriots ===
After coach Raymond Berry benched and then cut future CFL record-setting MVP and champion Doug Flutie before being fired himself in 1989, the Patriots had three more losing seasons, including a dismal 1–15 regular season record in 1990. Then, in 1993, New England turned to veteran head coach Bill Parcells to lead the team, hoping to repeat the success he had with the New York Giants.

Although the Patriots posted a 5–11 regular season record during Parcells' first year, eight of their losses were by 7 points or fewer. To Parcells' credit, much of the improvement was the result of the contributions from their draft picks that they made before the season: linebackers Willie McGinest and Chris Slade. Tight end Ben Coates also became a major contributor as a favorite target of quarterback Drew Bledsoe, who was taken with the #1 overall pick in the 1993 draft. With that improvement, the team was sold to Robert Kraft in January 1994 for a then-record price of $200 million. It was an astonishing price considering the Patriots had long been considered a laughingstock by local and national media as well as opponents and had one of the worst stadiums in the league (Foxboro Stadium). During the losing spell they had rarely sold out, resulting in most games going without local television coverage. Sports in New England at that time centered on the beloved, successful, Celtics, Red Sox, and Bruins, not the NFL team orphaned in remote Foxborough, Massachusetts, thirty miles outside Boston. (During an earlier run of 13 years in the 1970s and 1980s with only 1 losing season, the very competitive Patriots sold out that venue regularly.) The team even flirted twice with the idea of relocating to Hartford to move into a metropolitan area and have a new stadium built.

The team then posted a 10–6 record in 1994 after starting the regular season at 3–6 but were eliminated by the Cleveland Browns in their first playoff game. The Krafts had also eliminated the practice of TV blackouts (and courted and nailed deals with local affiliates), and the season resulted in a resurgence of popularity in the NFL game across the region. New England then had a let down and failed to make the playoffs in 1995, a year when many organizations were coming to grips with the new salary cap put in by the NFL to improve competition in the league. In the offseason, Parcells hired his old Giants defensive coordinator, Bill Belichick, as assistant head coach and defensive backs coach. Part of the team's spotty performance that season might have been that the head coach, Parcells, and the new owner, Kraft, did not get along well. Belichick came to serve during the 1996 season as the head coach's interface with the Kraft family and the non-football operations side of the business.

After losing their first two games in the 1996 regular season with lackluster performances, the Patriots ran through the rest of the season competitive in every game, finishing with an 11–5 record (their best in the Parcells era) and winning the AFC East. The Patriots' offense became the 7th-best unit in the league in terms of yards, and 2nd-best (behind the Packers) in points. Their pass offense, led by Bledsoe and wide receiver Terry Glenn, ranked third in the NFL. Bledsoe threw for 4,086 yards and 27 touchdowns against 15 interceptions. Glenn set a rookie record with 90 receptions, which yielded 1,132 yards and 6 touchdowns. Tight end Ben Coates was also a big contributor, catching 62 passes for 682 yards and 9 touchdowns. Wide receiver Shawn Jefferson recorded 50 receptions for 771 yards and 4 touchdowns.

Running back Curtis Martin was the focal point of the rushing attack with his 1,152 yards and 14 touchdowns on the ground, while also catching 46 passes for another 333 yards and 3 touchdowns. Pro Bowl running back Dave Meggett provided the team with a good special teams threat, gaining 1,369 yards and a touchdown returning kickoffs and punts, while also rushing for 122 yards and catching 33 passes for 292 yards.

On defense, the team's main weapon was Pro Bowler McGinest, who recorded 49 tackles, 2 fumble recoveries, an interception which he returned 46 yards for a touchdown, and a team-leading 9.5 sacks. Linebacker Chris Slade added 7 sacks and 3 forced fumbles. New England also had a solid secondary, led by defensive backs Willie Clay (72 tackles, a fumble recovery, 4 interceptions, 50 return yards), Ty Law (56 tackles, 3 interceptions, 45 return yards, 1 touchdown), and Lawyer Milloy (54 tackles, 1 sack, 1 fumble recovery, 2 interceptions).

=== Green Bay Packers ===
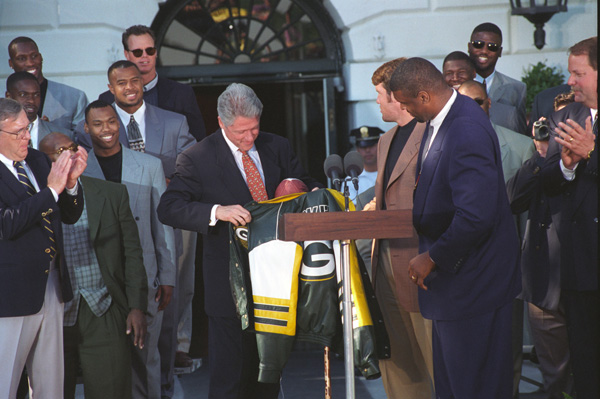
Brett Favre and Reggie White (front) present a Packers jacket to President Bill Clinton in May 1997.

After winning Super Bowl II after the 1967 regular season, the Packers became a losing team for much of the 1970s and 1980s, only making the playoffs in 1972 and the strike-shortened 1982 season. In addition to having the reputation of being a poor team, the Packers were unable to attract good players because many did not want to play in Green Bay's cold winter climate for a small market team.

All that changed when former San Francisco 49ers offensive coordinator Mike Holmgren became the Packers head coach in 1992. During his first year, the team improved to a 9–7 regular season record, barely missing the playoffs. One of the significant players on the 1992 Packers team was second-year quarterback Brett Favre, who spent his rookie season as a third-string quarterback for the Atlanta Falcons. During a September 20, 1992, game against the Cincinnati Bengals, Favre replaced injured starter Don Majkowski and proceeded to lead the team to a comeback victory. Afterwards, Favre became the starter for the rest of that season and held that position with the Packers until his purported retirement and subsequent conditional trade to the New York Jets in 2008 (followed by a departure for Minnesota in 2009).

Green Bay then made the playoffs in the 1993, 1994, and the 1995 seasons. As Holmgren, Favre, and the Packers continued to win, they were able to attract impact free agents like veteran defensive end Reggie White, nicknamed the "Minister of Defense", who joined the team in 1993.

In 1996, the Packers posted an NFC-best 13–3 regular season record after winning eight of their first nine games to start the season. After losing two straight games in November, they finished off the regular season winning their remaining five games, including dominating wins over two playoff teams: the Denver Broncos, 41–6, and the Minnesota Vikings, 38–10. The Packers' defense also led the league in both fewest points and yards allowed. They allowed 210 points and also scored an NFL-best 456 points, becoming the first team since the 1972 Miami Dolphins to score the most points in the league and allow the fewest. They set an NFL record with seven wins by at least 25 points.

Favre won the NFL Most Valuable Player Award for the second straight season after throwing for 3,899 yards and an NFC record 39 touchdown passes during the 1996 regular season, with only 13 interceptions. His 39 touchdown passes were the third-highest total in league history at that time. Favre was also a good runner, ranking third on the team with 136 rushing yards and scoring 2 touchdowns.

The Packers had another valuable asset in game-breaking kick returner Desmond Howard. The former Heisman Trophy winner's NFL career as a wide receiver was widely viewed as a disappointment up until this point, recording just 92 receptions in his first four NFL seasons. After joining Green Bay before the 1996 season, the team used him as a kick returner. Howard excelled in this role and ended up setting an NFL record with 875 punt return yards, while also leading the league in yards per return (15.1) and punt return touchdowns (3). He also caught 13 passes for 95 yards and added another 460 yards returning kickoffs.

Green Bay also had a number of offensive weapons. Wide receiver Antonio Freeman led the team with 933 yards and 9 touchdowns. Multi-talented veteran wide receiver Don Beebe, who had the best season of his career, was also a constant breakaway threat, catching 39 passes for 699 yards and 4 touchdowns and adding another 403 yards and a touchdown returning kickoffs. Beebe was a member of the Buffalo Bills during their four Super Bowl losses and was thus extremely eager for another shot at a Super Bowl win. Late in the season, after a string of injuries sent star receiver Robert Brooks out for the season and caused Freeman to miss four games, Green Bay made another big addition to their receiving corps by signing Andre Rison, who had been cut by the Jacksonville Jaguars and finished the season with 47 receptions for 593 yards and 3 touchdowns. The Packers also had two outstanding tight ends: Pro Bowler Keith Jackson recorded 40 catches for 504 yards and 10 touchdowns, and Mark Chmura had 28 receptions for 370 yards.

Although Green Bay's running game did not have any standout backs or Pro Bowlers, running backs Dorsey Levens and Edgar Bennett, and fullback William Henderson were all very good at blocking, running, and receiving. Bennett was the team's leading rusher with 899 yards, while also catching 31 passes for 176 yards and scored 3 touchdowns. Levens rushed for 566 yards, caught 31 passes for 226 yards, returned 5 kickoffs for 84 yards, and scored 10 touchdowns. Henderson had 130 rushing yards, caught 27 passes for 203 yards, and returned 2 kickoffs for 38 yards. Up front, Pro Bowl center Frank Winters anchored the offensive line, along with guard Adam Timmerman.

On defense, White continued to be a weapon, recording 29 tackles, 3 fumble recoveries, and led the team with 8.5 sacks. Defensive tackle Santana Dotson was also a big asset, recording 5.5 sacks and a fumble recovery. In the secondary, the team was led by safety Eugene Robinson, who recorded 55 tackles, 6 interceptions, and 107 return yards. Defensive back LeRoy Butler was also a major force, recording 65 tackles, 6.5 sacks, 2 fumble recoveries, and 5 interceptions for 149 return yards and a touchdown.

=== Playoffs ===
Aided by Martin's 166 rushing yards and 3 touchdowns, including a 78-yard touchdown run in the 2nd quarter, the Patriots first eliminated the defending AFC champion Pittsburgh Steelers, 28–3. New England gained a total of 346 yards in the game, while limiting Steelers quarterback Mike Tomczak to just 110 passing yards with no touchdowns and 2 interceptions.

The Patriots then defeated the Jacksonville Jaguars 20–6 in the AFC Championship Game. The Jaguars, an expansion team in 1995, advanced after upsetting the AFC's top seed, the Denver Broncos. However, New England took advantage of several key Jacksonville miscues in a game dominated by defense. A bad snap allowed Patriots defensive back Larry Whigham to tackle Jaguars punter Bryan Barker at the Jacksonville 4-yard line, setting up Martin's 1-yard touchdown run a few plays later. The Jaguars scored a field goal in the 2nd quarter, but Jacksonville punt returner Chris Hudson's fumble set up Patriots kicker Adam Vinatieri's 29-yard field goal. Eventually, the teams exchanged field goals, and the Patriots led 13–6 going into the 4th quarter. With under 4 minutes left in the game, the Jaguars reached the New England 5-yard line, but Patriots safety Willie Clay intercepted a pass in the end zone. After New England was forced to punt, cornerback Otis Smith recovered a fumble from Jaguars running back James Stewart and returned it 47 yards for a touchdown to put the game away.

Meanwhile, the Packers first eliminated the San Francisco 49ers, 35–14. Green Bay's defense and special teams dominated the game, forcing 5 turnovers, and helped the team score 35 points even though Favre was limited to just 79 passing yards. San Francisco starting quarterback Steve Young, who was still suffering from a rib injury sustained during the 49ers' 14–0 playoff win over the Philadelphia Eagles the previous week, had to leave the game in the 1st quarter. Howard opened up the scoring by returning a punt 71 yards for a touchdown. Later, he returned a punt 46 yards to set up Favre's 4-yard touchdown pass to Andre Rison. By the time the first half ended, Green Bay had a commanding 21–7 lead. San Francisco cut their deficit to 7 points with a 3rd-quarter touchdown, but the Packers responded by driving 72 yards to score a touchdown of their own, in which a fumble by Bennett was recovered in the end zone by Freeman. Green Bay then put the game away with an 11-yard touchdown run by Bennett.

Green Bay then defeated the Carolina Panthers 30–13 in the NFC Championship Game. Like the Jaguars, the Panthers were a 1995 expansion team that advanced to the conference title game. But unlike Jacksonville, Carolina came into the contest as the NFC's #2 seed and had eliminated the defending Super Bowl champion Dallas Cowboys, 26–17. In the NFC Championship Game, Carolina scored first with a 3-yard touchdown reception by Howard Griffith, but Green Bay scored on two touchdown passes by Favre and a field goal in the 2nd quarter to take a 17–10 halftime lead. The Packers then dominated the second half, only allowing one more field goal from the Panthers. Levens recorded 5 catches for 117 yards and a touchdown, along with 88 rushing yards. Bennett rushed for 99 yards and a touchdown. Favre threw for 292 yards and 2 touchdowns with 1 interception. Kicker Chris Jacke scored three field goals. By advancing to the Super Bowl, the Packers broke a streak since Super Bowl XXVI that had either the Dallas Cowboys or the San Francisco 49ers representing the NFC in the championship game. It also marked the Packers' first Super Bowl appearance since winning the first two to culminate their dynasty under Lombardi and Hall of Fame quarterback Bart Starr.

=== Super Bowl pregame news and notes ===
The Packers were favored to win the game by 14 points, largely because many thought the Patriots were a Cinderella team, and because of the recent dominance of the NFC in Super Bowl games.

The signing of Andre Rison by Green Bay late in the season had been a surprise to the league. Rison had been released by two teams over the previous two years and was known as a serious disciplinary problem for skipping team meetings. The previous year, the Packers had tried to sign Rison and Favre had spoken positively when a deal was not reached, stating "We saved a lot of money, and a lot of heartache because he was a problem internally." Rison later replied that if he were a defensive player, "I'd try to break his face." He also added "maybe a couple of years ago, I would have said he's a hillbilly jealous of a black man making money. But now I'm at this age. No comment."

Much of the pregame hype surrounded the conflict between Parcells and Patriots owner Robert Kraft. Kraft took control of the team after Parcells was hired, and the two of them had different ideas on how to run the organization. Six days before the Super Bowl, in an article by Will McDonough, The Boston Globe reported Parcells would leave the Patriots after the Super Bowl to become the coach of the New York Jets. The book Patriot Reign alleges the Patriots have cell phone records showing Parcells was in constant contact with the Jets during the week. Then-Patriots defensive backs coach (and former head coach) Bill Belichick is quoted as saying Parcells' plans to leave for the Jets were a distraction, "Yeah, I'd say it was a little bit of a distraction all the way around. I can tell you first-hand, there was a lot of stuff going on prior to the game. I mean, him talking to other teams. He was trying to make up his mind about what he was going to do. Which, honestly, I felt [was] totally inappropriate. How many chances do you get to play for the Super Bowl? Tell them to get back to you in a couple of days. I'm not saying it was disrespectful to me, but it was in terms of the overall commitment to the team." Parcells even refused to travel back with the rest of the Patriots after the game and was eventually hired by the rival Jets.

To honor former NFL commissioner Pete Rozelle, who died on December 6, 1996, each player wore a special helmet decal with Rozelle's signature, "Pete", printed across the NFL logo. Tributes to Rozelle were also published in the game program.

Starting with this game, through Super Bowl XXXVII, the Super Bowl logo was painted at the 50-yard line, and the teams' helmets were placed on the 30-yard lines. In the past Super Bowl games since Super Bowl VI, the NFL logo was painted on the 50-yard line, except for Super Bowls XXV and XXIX. The Super Bowl XXV logo was painted at midfield, and the NFL 75th Anniversary logo was painted at midfield in Super Bowl XXIX. The league started to put the NFL logo at midfield again for Super Bowl XXXVIII.

Coincidentally, the first Super Bowl appearance for the Patriots was also in the Superdome and against an NFC Central team on the same calendar day (January 26). In Super Bowl XX, the Patriots lost to the Chicago Bears, whose rivalry with the Packers is said to be the NFL's oldest. Also, this was the second time that the Packers faced a team from Boston for the league championship. The only other occurrence was in the 1936 NFL Championship Game, in which the Packers defeated the then-Boston Redskins.

As the designated home team, the Packers wore their home green uniforms and gold pants, while the Patriots went with their road white uniforms and silver pants.

== Broadcasting ==
The game was the first Super Bowl to be televised in the United States by Fox. Play-by-play announcer Pat Summerall and color commentator John Madden, both previously of CBS, called the game. This was the first of three Super Bowls to be called by Summerall and Madden while with Fox (Super Bowls XXXIII and XXXVI being the others). James Brown hosted all the pregame, halftime, and postgame coverage with help from his fellow Fox NFL Sunday cast members Terry Bradshaw, Howie Long, and Ronnie Lott.

Fox's broadcast was the first Super Bowl to have a constant, live-updating graphic for the score, time, and down and distance. Fox had introduced the "FoxBox" when it began its NFL coverage in 1994, and the graphic positioned over live action eventually became the norm in virtually all sports broadcasts at the national and regional production levels.

Continuing the trend of Super Bowl television ratings, the telecast broke the then-record for the highest-rated program in the history of the then-ten-year-old Fox network. For the Super Bowl lead-out program after the game, Fox televised The X-Files episode "Leonard Betts".

This was also the first time the NFL assumed production of game coverage for countries outside the United States, as would happen during the every subsequent year Fox has aired the Super Bowl. The game's broadcasters on CTV in Canada, Channel 4 in the United Kingdom, the Nine Network in Australia, ABC 5 in the Philippines, and other English-speaking countries were Gary Thorne, Don Lane and John Smith. Earl Mann narrated the NFL's Greatest Games episode Big Showdown in the Big Easy about this game.

== Entertainment ==
=== Pregame ceremonies ===
The pregame show featured Los del Río, who performed their multi-platinum smash hit "Macarena", the dance craze that became a worldwide summer hit in 1996. Country singer-songwriter Mary Chapin Carpenter and Cajun musical group BeauSoleil also appeared singing Carpenter's hit "Down at the Twist and Shout".

R&B singer Luther Vandross later sang the national anthem, and Miss Louisiana 1996 Erika Schwarz Wright performed sign language for the national anthem. The anthem concluded with a flyover of F-16 Fighting Falcons from the 78th Fighter Squadron of Shaw Air Force Base.

The coin toss ceremony featured the winning head coaches of the previous Super Bowl games played in New Orleans: Hank Stram (Super Bowl IV), Tom Landry (Super Bowl VI, Super Bowl XII), Chuck Noll (Super Bowl IX), Tom Flores (Super Bowl XV), Mike Ditka (Super Bowl XX), and George Seifert (Super Bowl XXIV). Hank Stram was given the honor of doing the coin toss.

=== Halftime show ===
The halftime show was titled "Blues Brothers Bash" and featured actors Dan Aykroyd, John Goodman, and Jim Belushi as The Blues Brothers. The show highlighted blues music and also had performances by singer James Brown and the rock band ZZ Top.

== Game summary ==
=== First quarter ===
The Packers forced the Patriots to punt on the opening possession of the game and started their first drive with great field position after wide receiver Desmond Howard returned the ball 32 yards to the Green Bay 46-yard line. Green Bay then opened up the scoring with quarterback Brett Favre's 54-yard touchdown pass to wide receiver Andre Rison on their second offensive play of the game, giving them an early 7–0 lead. Then on the second play of New England's ensuing drive, cornerback Doug Evans intercepted a pass from quarterback Drew Bledsoe at the Patriots' 28-yard line. On the first play after the turnover, Patriots defensive end Ferric Collons sacked Favre for a 10-yard loss, but Packers running back Dorsey Levens rushed for 4 yards and caught a pass for 14 over the next two plays, setting up kicker Chris Jacke's 37-yard field goal to increase Green Bay's lead to 10–0.

New England stormed back, scoring touchdowns on each of their next two possessions. On the second play of the Patriots' ensuing drive, Bledsoe completed a 32-yard screen pass to fullback Keith Byars and followed it up with a "dump-off" pass to running back Curtis Martin, who caught the ball near the line of scrimmage and ran 20 yards to the Packers' 27-yard line. Bledsoe then threw three straight incompletions, but on the third attempt, Packers cornerback Craig Newsome was called for pass interference in the end zone, which gave the Patriots a new set of downs at the 1-yard line. On the next play, Bledsoe completed a 1-yard touchdown pass to Byars to cut New England's deficit to 10–7.

The Patriots then forced the Packers to punt from their own 17-yard line after a three-and-out, giving the Patriots the ball back after running back Dave Meggett received Craig Hentrich's 39-yard punt at the New England 43-yard line. The Patriots advanced 57 yards in just four plays; after a 7-yard reception and a 2-yard run by Martin on their first two plays, Bledsoe completed a 44-yard pass to wide receiver Terry Glenn to advance to the Green Bay 4-yard line, and then tight end Ben Coates caught a 4-yard touchdown pass, giving New England their first lead of the game, 14–10. The Packers and Patriots combined for 24 points, the most ever scored in the first quarter of a Super Bowl. The Patriots became the first team in Super Bowl history to score two touchdowns in the first quarter and lose the game.

=== Second quarter ===
New England's lead did not last long. After the teams exchanged punts twice going into the second quarter, Favre threw a Super Bowl-record 81-yard touchdown pass to wide receiver Antonio Freeman, putting Green Bay back in front with a 17–14 lead, and they would not trail New England again for the rest of the game. On third down of the Patriots' next drive, safety LeRoy Butler powered through Meggett's block attempt and managed to drag Bledsoe down with one arm for a 9-yard sack, forcing a punt by Tom Tupa that Howard returned 34 yards to the Patriots' 47-yard line. Green Bay then drove to the New England 14, featuring a 23-yard reception by Rison and a 12-yard run by Levens, to score on Jacke's 31-yard field goal to increase their lead to 20–14.

Meggett returned the ensuing kickoff 21 yards to the Patriots 25-yard line. On the first play of the drive, Bledsoe completed a 19-yard pass to Coates to advance to their own 44-yard line. But two plays later, Packers safety Mike Prior intercepted a long pass intended for wide receiver Shawn Jefferson and returned it 8 yards to the Green Bay 26-yard line. After the turnover, Favre completed a 10-yard pass to tight end Keith Jackson, followed by a 22-yard pass to Freeman, and Levens rushed four times for 31 yards on a 9-play, 74-yard drive that took 5:59 off the clock. Favre finished the drive himself with a 2-yard touchdown run to give Green Bay a 27–14 lead with just 1:11 left in the half.

After a 24-yard kickoff return by Meggett, Bledsoe completed an 18-yard pass to Coates, and followed it up with a 10-yard pass to Glenn. Then after a 1-yard run by Meggett on the next play, Bledsoe completed a 7-yard pass to wide receiver Vincent Brisby to bring up 3rd-and-2 from the Packers' 42. However, Green Bay's defense forced back-to-back incompletions from Bledsoe, turning the ball over on downs with just 19 seconds left before halftime. The Packers tried to get into scoring range by calling a pass on the next play, but linebacker Willie McGinest sacked Favre for a 7-yard loss, and the score remained 27–14 at halftime.

=== Third quarter ===
Howard returned the second half kickoff 23 yards to the Green Bay 25-yard line. From there, Favre led the Packers all the way to the New England 37, aided by two passes to tight end Mark Chmura for 13 yards and two passes to fullback William Henderson for 14 yards. However, the Patriots' defense stood their ground on this drive. They stopped Levens for no gain on 3rd-and 1, and then linebacker Ted Johnson sacked him for a 7-yard loss on 4th down. Then after driving to the Green Bay 41-yard line, New England was forced to punt, but they managed to pin Green Bay deep in their own territory when Howard made a fair catch of Tupa's 29-yard punt at the 12-yard line. On the ensuing drive, a 7-yard sack by Patriots cornerback Otis Smith helped the Patriots' defense force the Packers to punt, and the Patriots got the ball back with great field position after Meggett returned Craig Hentrich's 48-yard punt 6 yards to the New England 47-yard line.

Desmond Howard's 99-yard kick return touchdown in the Superdome in Super Bowl XXXI
- Green Bay Packers return specialist Desmond Howard returns Adam Vinatieri's kickoff 99 yards for a touchdown in Super Bowl XXXI, January 26, 1997

Taking advantage of their excellent starting field position, New England drove 53 yards in 7 plays, which featured a 13-yard reception by Coates and three runs by Martin for 30 yards, the last of which was for an 18-yard touchdown to cut Green Bay's lead to 27–21. But the Packers immediately responded on the ensuing kickoff when Howard returned the ball 99 yards for a touchdown (the only kickoff Howard returned for a touchdown in his career) – the longest play in Super Bowl history (later broken in Super Bowl XLIII and broken again in Super Bowl XLVII). Favre then completed a pass to Chmura for a two-point conversion, giving the Packers a 35–21 lead. The conversion marked the only points Chmura scored all season.

=== Fourth quarter ===
Howard's touchdown proved to be the last score of the game, as the defenses of both teams took over for the rest of the game. After the teams exchanged punts twice, Bledsoe threw his third interception of the game to Newsome. Green Bay then advanced to the New England 30-yard line, only to have Jacke miss a 47-yard field goal attempt wide right. After another exchange of punts, Bledsoe was intercepted again, this time by linebacker Brian Williams, allowing the Packers to run out the clock for the win.

After the game, Favre reflected on his long road to becoming a Super Bowl champion, which included the death of his friend Mark Harvy in a car accident during the season. "Through everything I really believed I'd be here today. Right here in this stairwell, talking about being world champions. My best friend's gone forever. Trouble never seems to be far away, and the future won't be all rosy, but they can't take this away from me. Thirty years from now, the kids will be getting ready for Super Bowl LXI, and NFL Films will drag out Steve Sabol — he'll be around 102 then — and he'll talk about how Brett Favre fought through such adversity. And there will be other players and coaches. But I know this: We etched our place in history today."

The Packers outgained the Patriots 323 yards to 257 and intercepted Bledsoe four times. Freeman was the top receiver of the game, finishing with 105 receiving yards and a touchdown on only 3 receptions. Dorsey Levens was the game's leading rusher with 61 rushing yards and caught 3 passes for 23 yards. Favre completed 14 out of 27 passes for 246 yards and 2 touchdowns and had 12 rushing yards and another touchdown on 4 carries. Favre became the first Super Bowl-winning quarterback to have at least three touchdowns (Favre had 2 throwing, 1 rushing) and not be named Super Bowl MVP.

Bledsoe finished the game with 11 more pass completions (25) than Favre, but only 7 more total passing yards (253). His four interceptions tied a Super Bowl record. Martin was limited to just 41 rushing yards and 1 touchdown on 11 carries, but he also caught 3 passes for 28 yards. Meggett recorded 155 combined net yards (117 kick return, 30 punt return, 8 receiving). Coates was the Patriots' leading receiver with 6 catches for 67 yards and a touchdown.

This was the first Super Bowl played at the Superdome in which the losing team's point total was something other than 10. The Dallas Cowboys beat the Denver Broncos 27–10 in Super Bowl XII, the Oakland Raiders defeated the Philadelphia Eagles 27–10 in Super Bowl XV, the Chicago Bears beat the New England Patriots 46–10 in Super Bowl XX, and the San Francisco 49ers beat the Denver Broncos 55–10 in Super Bowl XXIV.

=== Box score ===
Super Bowl XXXI: Green Bay Packers 35, New England Patriots 21

Quarter	1	2	3	4	Total
Patriots (AFC)	14	0	7	0	21
Packers (NFC)	10	17	8	0	35

at Louisiana Superdome, New Orleans, Louisiana

- Date: January 26, 1997
- Game time: 5:25 p.m. CST
- Game weather: 67 °F (19 °C), played indoors, domed stadium

Scoring summary

Quarter	Time	Drive			Team	Scoring information	Score	
Quarter	Time	Plays	Yards	TOP	Team	Scoring information	NE	GB
1	11:28	2	55	0:51	GB	Andre Rison 54-yard touchdown reception from Brett Favre, Chris Jacke kick good	0	7
1	8:42	4	9	1:58	GB	37-yard field goal by Jacke	0	10
1	6:35	6	79	2:07	NE	Keith Byars 1-yard touchdown reception from Drew Bledsoe, Adam Vinatieri kick good	7	10
1	2:33	4	57	2:11	NE	Ben Coates 4-yard touchdown reception from Bledsoe, Vinatieri kick good	14	10
2	14:04	1	81	0:10	GB	Antonio Freeman 81-yard touchdown reception from Favre, Jacke kick good	14	17
2	8:15	8	33	2:58	GB	31-yard field goal by Jacke	14	20
2	1:11	9	74	5:59	GB	Favre 2-yard touchdown run, Jacke kick good	14	27
3	3:27	7	53	3:25	NE	Curtis Martin 18-yard touchdown run, Vinatieri kick good	21	27
3	3:10	—	—	—	GB	Desmond Howard 99-yard kickoff return for a touchdown, 2-point pass good (Favre to Mark Chmura)	21	35
"TOP" = time of possession. For other American football terms, see Glossary of American football.							21	35

== Final statistics ==
Sources: NFL.com Super Bowl XXXI, Super Bowl XXXI Play Finder GB, Super Bowl XXXI Play Finder NE

=== Statistical comparison ===
	New England Patriots	Green Bay Packers
First downs	16	16
First downs rushing	3	8
First downs passing	12	6
First downs penalty	1	2
Third down efficiency	4/14	3/15
Fourth down efficiency	0/2	0/1
Net yards rushing	43	115
Rushing attempts	13	36
Yards per rush	3.3	3.2
Passing – Completions/attempts	25/48	14/27
Times sacked-total yards	5–39	5–38
Interceptions thrown	4	0
Net yards passing	214	208
Total net yards	257	323
Punt returns-total yards	4–30	6–90
Kickoff returns-total yards	6–135	4–154
Interceptions-total return yards	0–0	4–24
Punts-average yardage	8–45.1	7–42.7
Fumbles-lost	0–0	0–0
Penalties-total yards	2–22	3–41
Time of possession	25:45	34:15
Turnovers	4	0

=== Individual statistics ===
Patriots passing
	C/ATT^{1}	Yds	TD	INT	Rating
Drew Bledsoe	25/48	253	2	4	46.6
Patriots rushing
	Car^{2}	Yds	TD	LG^{3}	Yds/Car
Curtis Martin	11	42	1	18	3.82
Drew Bledsoe	1	1	0	1	1.00
Dave Meggett	1	0	0	0	0.00
Patriots receiving
	Rec^{4}	Yds	TD	LG^{3}	Target^{5}
Ben Coates	6	67	1	19	8
Terry Glenn	4	62	0	44	7
Keith Byars	4	42	1	32	7
Shawn Jefferson	3	34	0	14	8
Curtis Martin	3	28	0	20	5
Dave Meggett	3	8	0	5	6
Vincent Brisby	2	12	0	7	4

Packers passing
	C/ATT^{1}	Yds	TD	INT	Rating
Brett Favre	14/27	246	2	0	107.9
Packers rushing
	Car^{2}	Yds	TD	LG^{3}	Yds/Car
Dorsey Levens	14	61	0	12	4.36
Edgar Bennett	17	40	0	10	2.35
Brett Favre	4	12	1	12	3.00
William Henderson	1	2	0	2	2.00
Packers receiving
	Rec^{4}	Yds	TD	LG^{3}	Target^{5}
Antonio Freeman	3	105	1	81	6
Dorsey Levens	3	23	0	14	5
Andre Rison	2	77	1	54	7
William Henderson	2	14	0	8	2
Mark Chmura	2	13	0	8	3
Keith Jackson	1	10	0	10	2
Edgar Bennett	1	4	0	4	1
Terry Mickens	0	0	0	0	1

^{1}Completions/attempts ^{2}Carries ^{3}Long gain ^{4}Receptions ^{5}Times targeted

=== Records set ===
The following records were set in Super Bowl XXXI, according to the official NFL.com boxscore, the 2016 NFL Record & Fact Book and the ProFootball reference.com game summary.
Some records have to meet NFL minimum number of attempts to be recognized. The minimums are shown (in parentheses).

Player records set
Longest pass	81 yards (TD)	Brett Favre (Green Bay)
Longest reception	81 yards (TD)	Antonio Freeman (Green Bay)
Longest scoring play	99 yards kickoff return	Desmond Howard (Green Bay)
Longest kickoff return	99 yards	Desmond Howard (Green Bay)
Highest kickoff return average, career (4 returns)	38.5 yards (4–154)	Desmond Howard (Green Bay)
Most punt return yards gained, game	90 yards	Desmond Howard (Green Bay)
Records tied
Most combined yardage^{†} gained, game	244	Desmond Howard (Green Bay)
Most kickoff returns for touchdowns, game	1	Desmond Howard (Green Bay)
Most punt returns, game	6	Desmond Howard (Green Bay)
Most punt returns, career	6	Desmond Howard (Green Bay)
Most punt returns, career	6	David Meggett (New England)
Most interceptions thrown, game	4	Drew Bledsoe (New England)
Most 2 point conversions, game	1	Mark Chmura (Green Bay)

- † This category includes rushing, receiving, interception returns, punt returns, kickoff returns, and fumble returns.

Team records set
Most punt returns yards gained	90 yards	Packers
Records tied
Most points, first quarter	14 points	Patriots
Most Interceptions by	4	Packers
Fewest turnovers, game	0	Packers
Most kickoff returns for touchdowns	1	Packers
Most punt returns, game	6	Packers

Turnovers are defined as the number of times losing the ball on interceptions and fumbles.

Records set, both team totals
	Total	Packers	Patriots
Most points, first quarter	24 points	10	14
Most punt returns, game	10	6	4
Most punt return yards gained	120 yards	90	30
Records tied, both team totals
Fewest rushing attempts	49	36	13
Most times sacked	10	5	5
Fewest fumbles	0	0	0

== Starting lineups ==
Hall of Fame‡

New England	Position	Position	Green Bay
Offense
Shawn Jefferson	WR		Antonio Freeman
Bruce Armstrong	LT		Bruce Wilkerson
William Roberts	LG		Aaron Taylor
Dave Wohlabaugh	C		Frank Winters
Todd Rucci	RG		Adam Timmerman
Max Lane	RT		Earl Dotson
Ben Coates	TE		Mark Chmura
Terry Glenn	WR		Andre Rison
Drew Bledsoe	QB		Brett Favre‡
Curtis Martin‡	RB		Edgar Bennett
Keith Byars	FB		William Henderson
Defense
Ferric Collons	LE		Reggie White‡
Mark Wheeler	LT	DT	Santana Dotson
Pio Sagapolutele	RT	NT	Gilbert Brown
Willie McGinest	RE		Sean Jones
Chris Slade	LLB		Wayne Simmons
Ted Johnson	MLB		Ron Cox
Todd Collins	RLB		Brian Williams
Ty Law‡	LCB		Craig Newsome
Otis Smith	RCB		Doug Evans
Lawyer Milloy	SS		LeRoy Butler‡
Willie Clay	FS		Eugene Robinson

== Aftermath ==
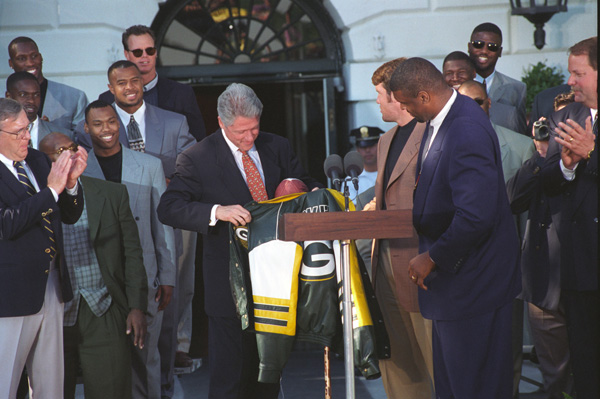
Brett Farve and Reggie White give President Bill Clinton a Packers jacket at the team's White House visit in 1997

=== Packers ===
The Packers returned to the Super Bowl the following year, losing to the Denver Broncos in Super Bowl XXXII in San Diego, California. In 2007, the Packers were favored to return to the Super Bowl to face the Patriots again but were upset at Lambeau Field by the eventual champion New York Giants, who went on to knock off the previously undefeated Patriots. It proved to be Favre's final game as a Packer, but three years later, Favre's successor Aaron Rodgers helped drive the Packers to regain the Vince Lombardi Trophy in Super Bowl XLV in Dallas against the Pittsburgh Steelers. Super Bowl XXXI was the Packers’ last win in the Superdome for 23 years; their next win wouldn't come until Week 3 of the 2020 season.

=== Patriots ===
Five years later, Belichick had returned to the Patriots and was in his second season as head coach, while Milloy, Law, Vinatieri, McGinest, Tedy Bruschi and Otis Smith, who all played in this Super Bowl, were still with the team when they made an unexpected return to the Superdome to face the "Greatest Show on Turf" St. Louis Rams in Super Bowl XXXVI. Bledsoe was also still there, but was now backing up Tom Brady, who was then just a second-year player who had thrown only three passes in his rookie season but had gone 11–3 as a starter to finish the regular season after Bledsoe had been knocked out in Week 2 against the Jets. (Bledsoe had replaced Brady after Pittsburgh's Lee Flowers knocked Brady out of the AFC Championship Game and proceeded to throw for a touchdown.) Law gave the Patriots a lead with an interception return for a touchdown off St. Louis' MVP Kurt Warner, and eventually, Vinatieri's 48-yard field goal as time expired following a clutch Brady drive – the first time a Super Bowl was won with a score on the final play – gave the Patriots a 20–17 upset victory and their first Super Bowl on their third visit to the Superdome on the NFL's ultimate stage. It also marked the birth of the Patriots' dynasty as the first of six Super Bowl victories in nine appearances under Brady and Belichick.

== Officials ==
- Referee: Gerald Austin #34 second Super Bowl (XXIV as side judge)
- Umpire: Ron Botchan #110 fourth Super Bowl (XX, XXVII, XXIX)
- Head linesman: Earnie Frantz #111 second Super Bowl (XXIV)
- Line judge: Jeff Bergman #32 first Super Bowl
- Back judge: Scott Steenson #88 first Super Bowl
- Side judge: Tom Fincken #47 second Super Bowl (XXIX)
- Field judge: Phil Luckett #59 first Super Bowl
- Alternate referee: Ed Hochuli #85
- Alternate umpire: Neil Gereb #50

Jeff Bergman and his father, Jerry Bergman Sr., became the first father-son combination to officiate Super Bowls. Jerry was the head linesman (now down judge) for four Super Bowls (XIII, XVI, XVIII, XXIII).
