= Santana Dotson =

American football player (born 1969)

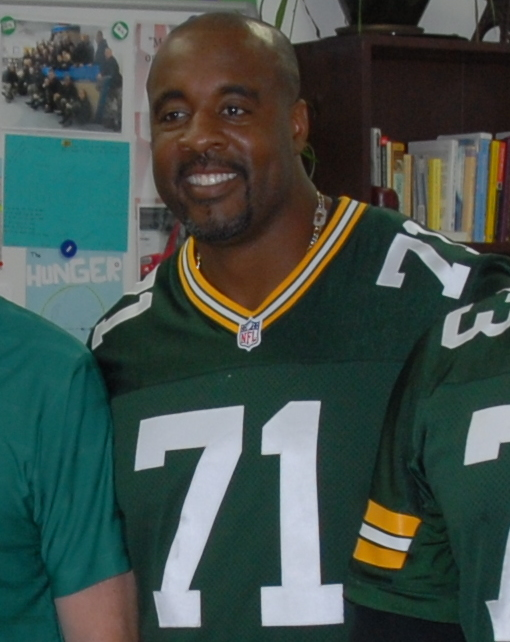
- Dotson in 2013

No. 71
- Positions: Defensive end, defensive tackle

Personal information
- Born: December 19, 1969 (age 56); New Orleans, Louisiana, U.S.
- Listed height: 6 ft 5 in (1.96 m)
- Listed weight: 287 lb (130 kg)

Career information
- High school: Yates (Houston, Texas)
- College: Baylor
- NFL draft: 1992: 5th round, 132nd overall pick

Career history
- Tampa Bay Buccaneers (1992–1995); Green Bay Packers (1996–2001); Washington Redskins (2002)

Awards and highlights
- Super Bowl champion (XXXI); Sporting News Rookie of the Year (1992); PFWA All-Rookie Team (1992); Unanimous All-American (1991); 2× First-team All-SWC (1990, 1991); Second Team All-SWC (1989)

Career NFL statistics
- Tackles: 460
- Sacks: 49
- Fumble recoveries: 6
- Stats at Pro Football Reference

Santana N. Dotson (born December 19, 1969) is an American former professional football player who was a defensive tackle in the National Football League (NFL). He was a part of Houston's Yates High School football team when it won the 1985 5A state championship. Dotson played college football for the Baylor Bears, earning unanimous All-American honors in 1991. He was selected 132nd overall by the Tampa Bay Buccaneers in the fifth round of the 1992 NFL draft. He won the 1992 NFL Defensive Rookie of the Year with the Tampa Bay Buccaneers as he registered 10 sacks and then played in two Super Bowls with the Green Bay Packers. He won Super Bowl XXXI with the Packers.

Pre-draft measurables
Height	Weight	Arm length	Hand span	40-yard dash	10-yard split	20-yard split	20-yard shuttle	Vertical jump	Broad jump	Bench press
6 ft 4 1/4 in (1.94 m)	267 lb (121 kg)	33 3/4 in (0.86 m)	9 5/8 in (0.24 m)	5.03 s	1.86 s	3.00 s	4.62 s	28.5 in (0.72 m)	9 ft 1 in (2.77 m)	17 reps

Santana Dotson is working to become an NFL broadcaster, and currently appears on the "Bob & Brian Show," on WHQG Radio in Milwaukee, during the NFL season.

There are several other prominent football players in the Dotson family. Alphonse Dotson, father of Santana played at Grambling University then went on to play for several teams in the NFL, ending with the Oakland Raiders. Santana Dotson also has a nephew, Alonzo Dotson, who played for the Oklahoma Sooners, then was picked up as a free agent by the Washington Redskins, whom now in his 4th season with the New York Jets as a College Area Scout (South East) after spending 5 seasons with the Green Bay Packers as an area Scout.
