= Favre's Dad Game =

Notable 2003 regular season NFL game

Green Bay Packers (8–6)	Oakland Raiders (4–10)
41	7
Head coach: Mike Sherman	Head coach: Bill Callahan
	1	2	3	4	Total
GB	14	17	3	7	41
OAK	7	0	0	0	7
- Date: December 22, 2003
- Stadium: Network Associates Coliseum; Oakland, California, U.S.
- Favorite: Packers by 5.5
- Referee: Tony Corrente
- Attendance: 62,298

TV in the United States
- Network: ABC
- Announcers: Al Michaels, John Madden & Lisa Guerrero

Favre's Dad Game was a National Football League (NFL) regular season game played on December 22, 2003, between the Oakland Raiders (now known as the Las Vegas Raiders) and the Green Bay Packers. The game, which was broadcast on television nationally on Monday Night Football (MNF), was held at Network Associates Coliseum in Oakland, California, United States, during the 2003 NFL season. Brett Favre, the Packers quarterback and a future Pro Football Hall of Famer, had started 204 consecutive games leading up to the game against the Raiders, a record for NFL quarterbacks. The day before the game, Favre's father Irvin died after having a heart attack while driving. In the build-up to the game, there was much discussion by sports commentators regarding whether Favre would play, with Favre ultimately deciding to suit up and continue his consecutive start streak.

The game, which had playoff implications for the Packers, ended up being one of Favre's best statistical performances of his career, as he threw for 399 yards and 4 touchdowns en route to a 41–7 blowout. Post-game analysis focused on Favre's resolve to play even after his father's death, his successful completion of numerous high-difficulty passes and the Packers path to the playoffs. The Packers ended up making the playoffs, beating the Seattle Seahawks in the Wild Card round before losing in the Divisional round to the Philadelphia Eagles in the 4th and 26 game. In 2019, the NFL identified this game as the 52nd best in league history.

== Background ==
Both the Green Bay Packers and Oakland Raiders entered the 2003 NFL season after going to the playoffs the previous year, with the Raiders losing Super Bowl XXXVII to the Tampa Bay Buccaneers. After starting the season 2–2, the Raiders lost 8 of their next 9 games before beating the Baltimore Ravens in Week 15 to give them a record of 4–10. Through 10 games, the Packers record was 5–5; they won 3 of their next 4 games to put them at 8–6 and in position to secure a playoff berth. The Packers were set to travel to Network Associates Coliseum in Oakland, California, for a Monday Night Football game against the Raiders in Week 16, the second to last game of the year for each team. The Packers were favored by 5.5 points.

On December 21, 2003, a Sunday night the day before the scheduled game, Brett Favre's father Irvin died while driving in Mississippi. Favre, the Packers star quarterback at the time, had started 204 straight games, an NFL record for quarterbacks at the time. Irvin was instrumental to his son's growth as a football player early in his career, including coaching him in high school. There was much discussion that evening and the next day by sports commentators on whether Favre would play in the game, which would not only continue his streak of consecutive starts, but was also necessary for the Packers to maintain their chances of making the playoffs. Though the Packers gave Favre the option to sit out the game, Favre decided to play, stating his belief that his father would have wanted him to play. It was later determined that Irvin died of a heart attack while driving, causing him to swerve off of the road.

== Game summary ==
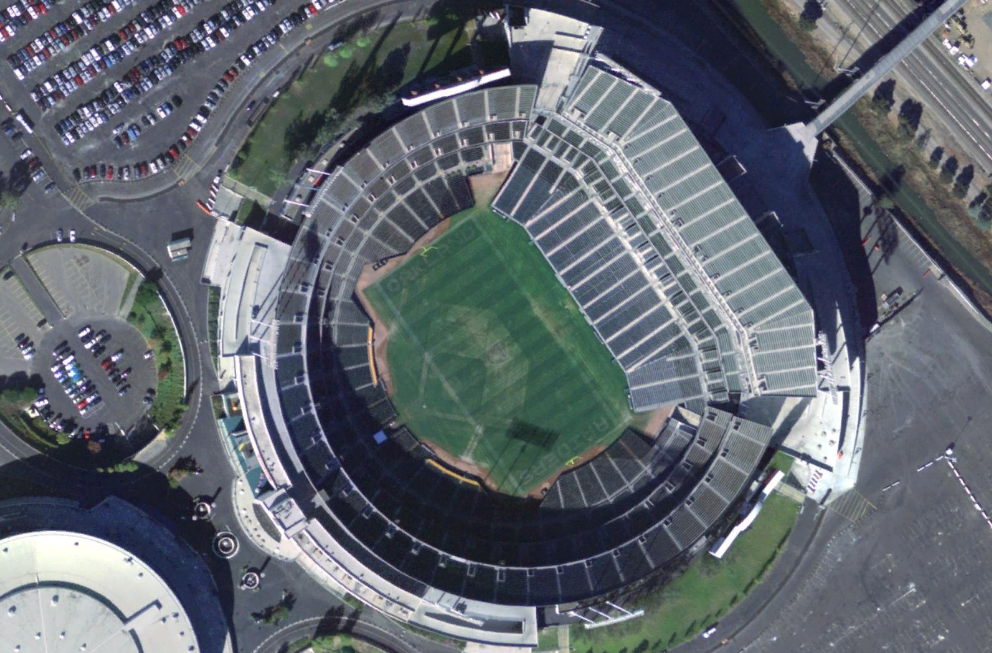
Network Associates Coliseum, shown here in 2007, was the site of the game.

=== First half ===
The Raiders started the game with possession of the ball and punted after a quick first down. The Packers then drove 80 yards in 6 plays, punctuated by a 47-yard reception by Robert Ferguson, that ended in a 22-yard touchdown pass from Brett Favre to Wesley Walls. The Raiders punted again on their next drive. After a 10-yard penalty and two short plays, Favre completed consecutive passes to Tony Fisher and Javon Walker for 32 and 23 yards respectively, with the last pass going for a touchdown. The Raiders took over down 14–0 near the end of the first quarter, beginning their only scoring drive of the game. Over a 6-play, 61-yard drive the Raiders rushed the ball 5 times, culminating in a 25-yard touchdown by Charlie Garner. On the next drive, the Packers drove down to the 13-yard line in 10 plays, with Favre connecting on passes for 12 yards, 11 yards and 32 yards. The Packers settled for a field goal by Ryan Longwell to go up 17–7 at the beginning of the second quarter. After a three-and-out by the Raiders, the Packers started their next drive on the 11-yard line and quickly scored on a 5-play, 89-yard drive that ended with a 43-yard touchdown reception by Walker. Both teams exchanged punts and then the Raiders were stopped on fourth down, turning the ball over on downs. The Packers drove 62 yards in 5 plays, with 46 of those yards coming from a 46-yard catch by Walker. Favre threw his fourth touchdown pass of the first half to David Martin to put the Packers up 31–7. The next Raiders' drive again ended in a turnover on downs, with the Packers running one play before the end of the half.

=== Second half ===
The Packers started the second half with the ball. They put together a short drive that ended in a 27-yard field goal to put the team up 34–7. The Raiders drove down the field, but quarterback Rick Mirer was intercepted in the end zone by Michael Hawthorne, giving the Packers the ball at the 20-yard line. The Packers moved the ball 50 yards over 10 plays, but ended up punting the ball back to the Raiders. Both teams exchanged punts after short drives, and then the Raiders again turned the ball over on downs after moving the ball 53 yards on 9 plays. The Packers finished off the scoring with a 9-play, 77-yard drive that ended in a 7-yard touchdown run by Ahman Green. Donald Driver caught a 41-yard pass earlier in the drive, which left the Packers up 41–7. Quarterback Rob Johnson, who replaced Mirer, was intercepted on the next Raiders drive, while the Packers subsequently turned the ball over on downs. The Raiders' last drive ended in a fumble by Tee Martin that was recovered by the Packers, which allowed them to run out the remainder of the clock.

=== Box score ===
Week Sixteen: Green Bay Packers at Oakland Raiders – Game summary

Quarter	1	2	3	4	Total
Packers	14	17	3	7	41
Raiders	7	0	0	0	7

at Network Associates Coliseum, Oakland, California

- Date: December 22, 2003
- Game time: 9:05pm EST
- Game weather: clear, 54 °F (12 °C), 83% humidity, wind 6 miles per hour (9.7 km/h)
- Game attendance: 62,298
- Referee: Tony Corrente
- TV announcers (ABC): Al Michaels, John Madden & Lisa Guerrero
- Sources: ESPN.com and Pro-Football-Reference.com

Game information

First quarter

- GB – Wesley Walls 22-yard pass from Brett Favre (Ryan Longwell kick), 9:18. Packers 7–0. Drive: 6 plays, 80 yards, 3:33.
- GB – Javon Walker 23-yard pass from Brett Favre (Ryan Longwell kick), 5:17. Packers 14–0. Drive: 4 plays, 53 yards, 0:41.
- OAK – Charlie Garner 25-yard run (Sebastian Janikowski kick), 2:03. Packers 14–7. Drive: 6 plays, 61 yards, 0:51.

Second quarter

- GB – Ryan Longwell 31-yard field goal, 11:35. Packers 17–7. Drive: 10 plays, 51 yards, 13:36.
- GB – Javon Walker 43-yard pass from Brett Favre (Ryan Longwell kick), 7:06. Packers 24–7. Drive: 5 plays, 89 yards, 2:30.
- GB – David Martin 6-yard pass from Brett Favre (Ryan Longwell kick), 0:54. Packers 31–7. Drive: 5 plays, 62 yards, 0:56.

Third quarter

- GB – Ryan Longwell 27-yard field goal, 13:00. Packers 34–7. Drive: 6 plays, 21 yards, 1:40.

Fourth quarter

- GB – Ahman Green 7-yard run (Ryan Longwell kick), 4:46. Packers 41–7. Drive: 9 plays, 77 yards, 3:43.

Green Bay Packers stats

Passing

- Brett Favre – 22/30, 399 yards, 4 touchdowns

Rushing

- Ahman Green – 24 rushes, 127 yards, 1 touchdown
- Najeh Davenport – 5 rushes, 18 yards
- Tony Fisher – 6 rushes, 13 yards

Receiving

- Javon Walker – 4 receptions, 124 yards, 2 touchdowns
- Robert Ferguson – 3 receptions, 85 yards
- Donald Driver – 3 receptions, 78 yards
- Bubba Franks – 3 receptions, 23 yards
- David Martin – 2 receptions, 4 yards, 1 touchdown
- Tony Fisher – 1 reception, 32 yards
- Wesley Walls – 1 reception, 22 yards, 1 touchdown
- Antonio Freeman – 1 reception, 13 yards
- Nick Luchey – 1 reception, 12 yards
- Najeh Davenport – 1 reception, 3 yards
- Ahman Green – 1 reception, 2 yards
- William Henderson – 1 reception, 1 yard
Oakland Raiders stats

Passing

- Rick Mirer – 12/23, 114 yards, 1 interception
- Rob Johnson – 6/13, 54 yards, 1 interception
- Tee Martin – 4/5, 55 yards

Rushing

- Tyrone Wheatley – 10 rushes, 56 yards
- Charlie Garner – 3 rushes, 27 yards, 1 touchdown
- Rob Johnson – 2 rushes, 15 yards
- Tee Martin – 1 rush, 6 yards

Receiving

- Jerry Rice – 10 receptions, 159 yards
- Tim Brown – 4 receptions, 30 yards
- Charlie Garner – 4 receptions, 19 yards
- Alvis Whitted – 1 reception, 8 yards
- Chris Hetherington – 1 reception, 6 yards
- Ronald Curry – 1 reception, 1 yard
- Teyo Johnson – 1 reception, 0 yards

=== Analysis ===
The Packers' blow-out victory kept their playoff hopes alive. Post-game analysis though noted Favre's fortitude to play, his spectacular performance and the emotional response from fans, teammates and his family during and after the game. At the end of the first half, Favre had thrown for 311 yards and 4 touchdown passes, giving him a perfect 158.3 passer rating. With the game well in hand, the Packers pulled Favre, although he still finished the game with 399 yards (the second-most of his career at the time). The Packers' wide receivers were also praised for their performance, successfully completing multiple high-difficulty catches. Fans, including Raiders fans, his teammates and family all showed Favre support before, during and after the game. In its post-game recap, the Milwaukee Journal Sentinel called Favre's performance "one of the greatest games of his fabulous career".

== Outcome ==
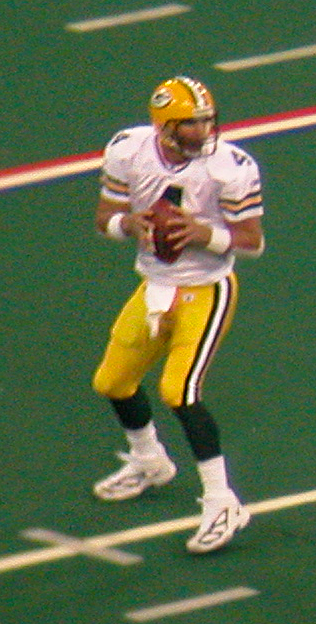
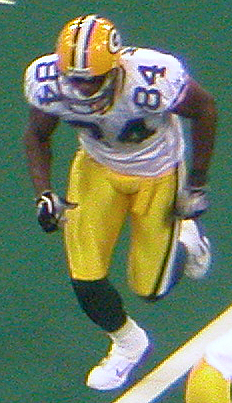
Brett Favre (left) and Javon Walker (right) combined for four catches, 124 yards and 2 touchdowns during the game.

After beating the Raiders, the Packers entered the last week of the season needing both their own victory over the Denver Broncos and a Vikings loss against the 3–12 Arizona Cardinals in order to win the NFC North and make the playoffs. The Packers beat the Broncos 31–3, giving them a record of 10–6, while the Vikings took a 17–6 lead into the fourth quarter. However, Cardinals' quarterback Josh McCown threw a touchdown pass to Nate Poole with no time left on the clock to give the Cardinals a win, giving the Packers the NFC North and a playoff berth while ending the Vikings season. The Raiders lost their last game of the year to the San Diego Chargers to give them a final record of 4–12.

The Packers hosted the Seattle Seahawks in the Wild Card round the next week. With the score tied at the end of regulation, the game went into overtime. After winning the coin flip for possession in the overtime period, Seahawks' quarterback Matt Hasselbeck proclaimed "we want the ball and we're going to score!" After a possession by each team, Hasselbeck threw an interception that was returned for a touchdown by Packers' cornerback Al Harris, giving the Packers a 33–27 victory. The next week, the Packers traveled to Philadelphia to play the Eagles in the Divisional round of the playoffs, in what became known as the 4th and 26 game. The Packers had a 17–14 lead with just over a minute left in the game, and the Eagles faced a fourth down with 26 yards to go. Eagles quarterback Donovan McNabb completed a 28-yard pass to Freddie Mitchell for the first down and ultimately led the team down the field for a game-tying field goal. In overtime, the Eagles kicked a game-winning field goal to win 20–17.

=== Legacy ===
In honor of the league's 100th anniversary, the NFL announced a list of the 100 greatest games, with Favre's performance against the Raiders ranking 52nd. It was also ranked by the Milwaukee Journal Sentinel as one of the greatest moments in Wisconsin sports history. Favre was praised by sports commentators for his resilience in the face of adversity, with the game going down as one of the greatest performances of his hall of fame career. His reputation for playing in every game grew stronger, as he continued his streak of consecutive starts. Favre started the game completing nine consecutive passes, with multiple catches by his receivers being contested catches with low probability for completion. The Raiders' crowd, usually well known for its ferocity towards opponents, showed its support for Favre. His teammates embraced him throughout the game and Favre's wife came down on the field during the game to support him. In reflecting on the game, Favre expressed his desire to go out and play a great game, while also stating "I knew that my dad would have wanted me to play. I love him so much, and I love this game".

== See also ==
- List of nicknamed NFL games and plays
