= 4th and 26 =

Notable NFL playoff game

Green Bay Packers (4) (10–6)	Philadelphia Eagles (1) (12–4)
17	20
Head coach: Mike Sherman	Head coach: Andy Reid
	1	2	3	4	OT	Total
GB	14	0	0	3	0	17
PHI	0	7	0	10	3	20
- Date: January 11, 2004
- Stadium: Lincoln Financial Field; Philadelphia, Pennsylvania, U.S.
- Favorite: Eagles by 5.5
- Referee: Ed Hochuli
- Attendance: 67,707

TV in the United States
- Network: Fox
- Announcers: Joe Buck, Troy Aikman and Cris Collinsworth

4th and 26 was a National Football League (NFL) Divisional Playoff game between the Green Bay Packers and Philadelphia Eagles on January 11, 2004. The Packers traveled to Lincoln Financial Field in Philadelphia, Pennsylvania, after beating the Seattle Seahawks in a wild card game the week before. After taking an early 14–0 lead, the Eagles tied the game in the fourth quarter, 14–14. After the Packers regained the lead on a late field goal, the Eagles got the ball with only a few minutes left to tie or take the lead. After a penalty and a sack pushed the Eagles back 16 yards, they faced a fourth down with 26 yards to go with just 1:12 left on the game clock. Eagles' quarterback Donovan McNabb completed a 28-yard pass to wide receiver Freddie Mitchell for a first down.

The Eagles continued their drive with a field goal to send the game into overtime. After the Eagles intercepted Packers' quarterback Brett Favre, kicker David Akers kicked a game-winning field goal to advance the Eagles to the NFC Championship Game, which they would lose 14–3 to the Carolina Panthers. The game gained notoriety for the improbable comeback by the Eagles, with one source stating that the odds of the Eagles conversion on fourth down with 26 yards to go and subsequent game-tying field goal was 1 out of 175.

== Background ==
The Green Bay Packers went 10–6 during the 2003 NFL season, enough to win the NFC North after ending the year on a 4-game winning streak. This included a 17–14 regular season loss to the Philadelphia Eagles in Week 10. The Eagles won the NFC East after going 12–4, which included a 9-game winning streak in the middle of the season. This record was enough to secure the 1st seed in the 2003–04 NFL playoffs and a first-round bye. The Packers saw success throughout the season behind the passing acumen of Brett Favre, who threw for 32 touchdowns and over 3,300 yards, and the rushing success of Ahman Green, who ran for 15 touchdowns and a team-record 1,883 yards. The Eagles offensive success primarily came from quarterback Donovan McNabb, who accumulated almost 3,600 yards combined passing and rushing. The Eagles relied on a "running back-by-committee" approach with Brian Westbrook, Correll Buckhalter and Duce Staley all rushing for over 450 yards for the season. Both teams employed defensive units ranked in the top 15 by scoring.

The Packers hosted the Seattle Seahawks in the first round of the playoffs, winning 33–27 in overtime courtesy of an interception returned for a touchdown by former Eagle Al Harris (known as the We want the ball and we're going to score! game). As the first seed in the playoffs, the Eagles secured home-field advantage throughout the playoffs. Thus, the divisional round playoff game was hosted by the Eagles at Lincoln Financial Field in Philadelphia, Pennsylvania, scheduled for the evening of Sunday, January 11, 2004. This would be the second postseason meeting between the Packers and Eagles; the previous meeting was back in the 1960 NFL Championship Game, which the Eagles won 17–13. The Eagles were 5.5 point favorites over the Packers.

== Game summary ==
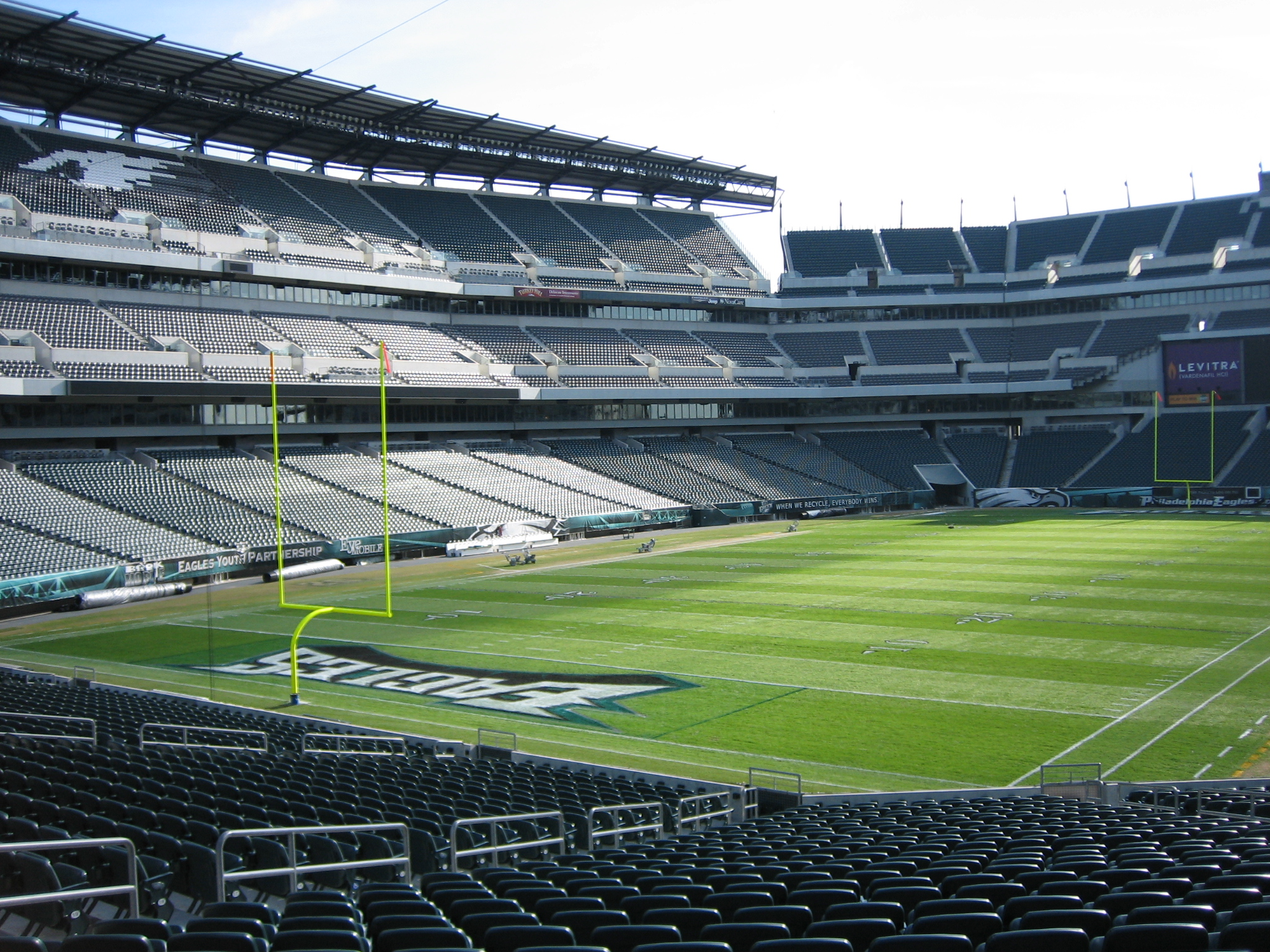
Lincoln Financial Field in South Philadelphia, the site of the game.

=== First half ===
The game began with four consecutive punts, two by each team. Midway through the first quarter, Eagles' quarterback Donovan McNabb fumbled the ball on the Eagles' 40-yard line, which Packers' linebacker Nick Barnett recovered. Packers' quarterback Brett Favre threw a 40-yard touchdown pass on the first play to Robert Ferguson to put the Packers on the scoreboard with a 7–0 lead. James Thrash returned the ensuing kickoff 36 yards to the 44-yard line. McNabb rushed for 41 yards on the first play to get the ball to the Packers 15-yard line. After a short rush and two incomplete passes, Eagles' kicker David Akers missed a 30-yard field goal attempt. After the missed field goal, Favre led the Packers on an 8-play, 88 -yard drive, which included a 26-yard run by Ahman Green. Favre threw his second touchdown pass to Ferguson from the 17-yard line, giving the Packers a 14–0 lead with 1:16 left in the first quarter. Both teams traded punts, before McNabb led the Eagles on their first scoring drive, completing five consecutive passes for 77 yards, including a 45-yard pass to Todd Pinkston. On the last play, his 7-yard touchdown pass to Duce Staley cut the lead to 14–7. The Packers took the ensuing kickoff and drove 67 yards to the Eagles' 1-yard line, featuring a 33-yard run by Green. On fourth down, Green was tackled for no gain. The Packers turned the ball over on downs and the Eagles ran out the rest of the time in the first half of the game.

=== Second half ===
The third quarter started with three short drives, each ending in a punt (two by the Packers and one by the Eagles). Late in the third quarter, the Eagles began an 8-play, 88-yard touchdown drive, despite two 10-yard penalties against them on the drive. McNabb was responsible for all of the yards on the drive, rushing for 37 yards and completing four passes for 72, including a 12-yard touchdown pass to Pinkston that tied the game at 14 on the first play of the fourth quarter. Each team punted once before the Packers began a 5-play, 48-yard drive that ended in a field goal. Starting at mid-field, Favre completed a 44-yard pass to Javon Walker, but the Packers were unable to get into the end zone. Ryan Longwell kicked a 21-yard field goal to give the Packers a 17–14 lead. The Eagles went three-and-out on the next drive and punted the ball. The Packers drove 33 yards on 10 plays but after a penalty on fourth down, they punted the ball back to the Eagles. Their drive started with a 22-yard run by Duce Staley, but on the next play, McNabb threw for an incomplete pass. On second down, the Eagles were penalized 5 yards for a false start and then a sack pushed the Eagles back to their own 26-yard line, and on third down, McNabb threw another incompletion. The Eagles, faced with a fourth down and 26 yards, needed to convert for a first down, with only 1:12 remaining and one timeout left.

==== 4th and 26 ====
The fourth down play (74 Double Go) called for a slant route to Freddie Mitchell. McNabb threw a deep pass to Mitchell and the Packers' Cover 2 defensive coverage broke down, allowing the reception. Darren Sharper played past the first down marker, positioning himself for an interception rather than preventing any play in front of the line to gain. The only other player that was close to making a play, Packers' safety Bhawoh Jue, was playing the sidelines and was too late to prevent the catch or first down. Mitchell completed the catch and was brought down at the Packers 46, giving the Eagles a first down.

==== End of the game ====
The Eagles gained another 27 yards, almost running the clock out, before Akers made a game-tying, 37-yard field goal, which led to the game going into overtime. The Eagles got the ball first, but punted after going three-and-out. On the first play of the Packers' drive, Eagles' safety Brian Dawkins intercepted a Favre pass and returned it 35 yards. The Eagles gained 21 yards to get into field goal range. Akers kicked a 31-yard, game-winning field goal attempt, giving the Eagles a 20–17 victory.

=== Box score ===
Divisional Playoffs: Green Bay Packers at Philadelphia Eagles – Game summary

Quarter	1	2	3	4	OT	Total
Packers	14	0	0	3	0	17
Eagles	0	7	0	10	3	20

at Lincoln Financial Field in Philadelphia, Pennsylvania

- Date: Sunday, January 11, 2004
- Game time: 4:46pm
- Game attendance: 67,707
- Referee: Ed Hochuli
- TV announcers (Fox): Joe Buck, Troy Aikman and Cris Collinsworth
- Sources: ESPN.com and Pro-Football-Reference.com

Game information

First quarter

- GB – Robert Ferguson 40-yard pass from Brett Favre (Ryan Longwell extra point), 7:54. Packers 7–0. Drive: 1 play, 40 yards, 0:17.
- GB – Robert Ferguson 17-yard pass from Brett Favre (Ryan Longwell extra point), 1:31. Packers 14–0. Drive: 8 plays, 86 yards, 3:30.

Second quarter

- PHI – Duce Staley 17-yard pass from Donovan McNabb (David Akers extra point), 6:32. Packers 14–7. Drive: 6 plays, 77 yards, 6:32.

Third quarter

- No scoring

Fourth quarter

- PHI – Todd Pinkston 17-yard pass from Donovan McNabb (David Akers extra point), 14:48. Tied 14–14. Drive: 8 plays, 89 yards, 15:27.
- GB – Ryan Longwell 21-yard field goal, 10:22. Packers 17–14. Drive: 5 plays, 48 yards, 0:57.
- PHI – David Akers 37-yard field goal, 0:05. Tied 17–17. Drive: 12 plays, 61 yards, 2:11.

Overtime

- PHI – David Akers 31-yard field goal, 10:18. Eagles 20–17. Drive: 6 plays, 21 yards, 2:39.

Green Bay Packers stats

Passing

- Brett Favre – 15/28, 180 yards, 2 touchdowns, 1 interception

Rushing

- Ahman Green – 25 rushes, 156 yards
- Najeh Davenport – 9 rushes, 42 yards
- Tony Fisher – 2 rushes, 9 yards
- Brett Favre – 1 rush, 3 yards

Receiving

- Robert Ferguson – 8 receptions, 146 yards, 2 touchdown
- Javon Walker – 1 reception, 44 yards
- Donald Driver – 2 receptions, 25 yards
- Ahman Green – 3 receptions, 16 yards
- Tony Fisher – 2 receptions, 13 yards
- Wesley Walls – 1 reception, 7 yards
- Bubba Franks – 1 reception, 6 yards
- William Henderson – 1 reception, 4 yards
Philadelphia Eagles stats

Passing

- Donovan McNabb – 21/39, 248 yards, 2 touchdowns

Rushing

- Donovan McNabb – 11 rushes, 107 yards
- Duce Staley – 5 rushes, 45 yards
- Joique Bell – 8 rushes, 5 yards
- Correll Buckhalter – 9 rushes, 12 yards

Receiving

- Todd Pinkston – 7 receptions, 95 yards, 1 touchdown
- Freddie Mitchell – 2 receptions, 37 yards
- Chad Lewis – 4 receptions, 37 yards
- L. J. Smith – 2 receptions, 31 yards
- Duce Staley – 3 receptions, 26 yards, 1 touchdown
- James Thrash – 1 reception, 9 yards
- Reno Mahe – 1 reception, 8 yards
- Correll Buckhalter – 1 reception, 5 yards

=== Analysis ===
The Eagles became just the second team in NFL history up to that point to win a playoff game after trailing by 14 points or more after the first quarter. The Milwaukee Journal Sentinel identified two series of events that led to the Eagles victory. First, in the second quarter the Packers were on the two-yard line, close to scoring. Najeh Davenport was stopped inches short of the goal line, and then on fourth down, Ahman Green was again stopped short after Mark Tauscher was unable to complete his block, leading to a turnover on downs. A touchdown or even a field goal would have likely changed the dynamic of the game. The second key moment came in the fourth quarter, when the Packers were at mid-field with a fourth down and less than a yard to go. Even though the Eagles' defense seemed exhausted, the Packers decided to punt the ball instead of go for the first down, which likely would have ended the game. McNabb was recognized for his ability to extend plays, with Sports Illustrated commenting that he "spent much of the second half turning busted plays into big gainers", while also noting that Favre's only real mistake came at the worst time (the interception in overtime). Lastly, the Packers' defense was criticized for its strategy and execution on the fourth and 26 play. Even though the Packers had kept McNabb under constant pressure during the game, they chose to only rush four players on the fourth down play and go into a soft zone coverage. Darren Sharper appeared to position himself for an interception instead of trying to stop Mitchell from gaining the first down, while other Packers players in the secondary gave the Eagles too much space and time.

== Outcome ==
Less than a week after the game, Packers defensive coordinator Ed Donatell was fired following criticisms from the media and fans after the 4th and 26 play. The Eagles' win advanced them to the NFC Championship Game, which they lost to the Carolina Panthers, 14–3, ending their season.

=== Legacy ===
In 2011 and 2012, the 4th and 26 play was noted in respective articles published in Advanced Football Analytics and the Journal of Quantitative Analysis in Sports. Both articles discussed the author's use of a Markov chain to estimate the probability of a series of football events. Author Keith Goldner stated that his Markov model found "the odds that a drive containing a 4th-and-26 from the 25 would end with a successful field goal" was "1 out of 175". Prior to a 2016 meeting in Philadelphia, the Eagles' scoreboard operator posted "4th and 26" as the down and distance to remind the Packers and their fans of that play. However, the Packers went on to win this game, 27–13.

4th and 26 was quickly compared to other notable plays in NFL history, such as The Catch or the Immaculate Reception. As such, it has become an important part of the histories of each franchise, as well as a key part of the rivalry between the two teams. In 2019, during the NFL's celebration of its 100th season, the NFL listed the 4th and 26 game as #69 on its list of the NFL's 100 greatest games.

== See also ==
- List of nicknamed NFL games and plays
