= 2003 Green Bay Packers season =

NFL team season

- Head coach: Mike Sherman
- Home stadium: Lambeau Field

Results
- Record: 10–6
- Division place: 1st NFC North
- Playoffs: Won Wild Card Playoffs (vs. Seahawks) 33–27 (OT); Lost Divisional Playoffs (at Eagles) 17–20 (OT)
- All-Pros: 1: G Marco Rivera (2nd team)
- Pro Bowlers: 6: QB Brett Favre; RB Ahman Green; TE Bubba Franks; G Marco Rivera; C Mike Flanagan; DE Kabeer Gbaja-Biamila

Uniform

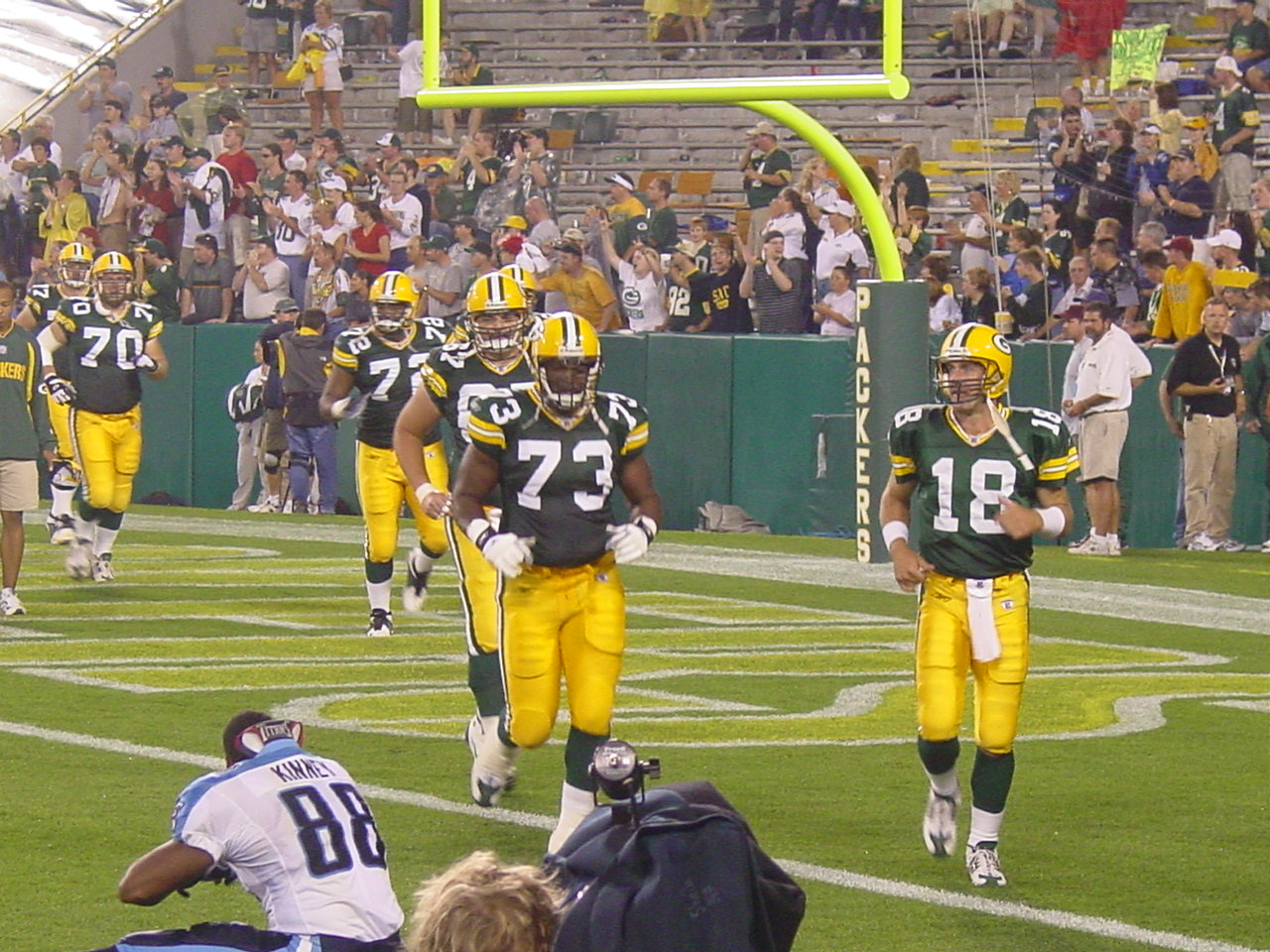
Packers (including QB Doug Pederson) at their preseason game against Tennessee, August 28, 2003

The 2003 Green Bay Packers season was the franchise's 85th season overall and their 83rd in the National Football League (NFL).

The Packers won the division on the last play of the season. Needing a win and a Minnesota Vikings loss to clinch the division, the Packers routed the Denver Broncos 31–3, while the Vikings lost 18–17 on a last second touchdown by the 3–12 Arizona Cardinals.

The Packers defeated the Seattle Seahawks in the wild card round in overtime off an interception return for a touchdown by Al Harris after Seahawks quarterback Matt Hasselbeck proclaimed "We want the ball and we're going to score!" after the overtime coin toss. However, the season finished with an overtime loss to the Philadelphia Eagles in the Divisional round of the playoffs after failing to stop the Eagles on 4th and 26, where a defensive stand on the play would have sealed the team a trip to the NFC Championship Game for the first time since 1997 as the Eagles had only one timeout remaining and just over a minute left in regulation.

In the Week 16 Monday night game, Brett Favre threw for 399 yards and four touchdowns in a 41–7 win over the Oakland Raiders, one night after his father died of a heart attack.

== Offseason ==
The Packers were able to add Al Harris to their starting lineup from a trade with Philadelphia. They lost starters Terry Glenn to a trade and Vonnie Holliday to free agency.

Additions	Subtractions
FB Nick Luchey (Bengals)	LB Nate Wayne (Eagles)
LB Hannibal Navies (Panthers)	S Matt Bowen (Redskins)
C Grey Ruegamer (Patriots)	CB Tyrone Williams (Falcons)
DE Chukie Nwokorie (Colts)	CB Tod McBride (Falcons)
OT Reggie Coleman (Bengals)	DE Vonnie Holliday (Chiefs)
RB Lamar Smith (Panthers)	WR Terry Glenn (Cowboys)
OT Marcus Spriggs (Dolphins)	LB Hardy Nickerson (retirement)
CB Al Harris (Eagles)	

=== NFL draft ===
2003 Green Bay Packers draft
Round	Pick	Player	Position	College	Notes
1	29	Nick Barnett	LB	Oregon State	
3	79	Kenny Peterson	DE	Ohio State	
5	147	James Lee	OT	Oregon State	
5	166	Hunter Hillenmeyer	LB	Vanderbilt	
6	212	Brennan Curtin	OT	Notre Dame	
7	245	Chris Johnson	CB	Louisville	
7	253	DeAndrew Rubin	WR	South Florida	
7	256	Carl Ford	WR	Toledo	
7	257	Steve Josue	LB	Carson-Newman	
Made roster

=== Undrafted free agents ===
2003 undrafted free agents of note
Player	Position	College
Keith Burnell	Cornerback	Delaware
Tommy Collins	Fullback	UConn
Quentus Cumby	Safety	Kentucky
Cullen Jenkins	Defensive end	Central Michigan
Shantee Orr	Linebacker	Michigan
David Porter	Guard/Tackle	Iowa
Eric Powell	Defensive end	Florida State
Jamil Soriano	Guard/Tackle	Harvard
J. R. Taylor	Running back	Eastern Illinois

== Personnel ==
=== Staff ===
2003 Green Bay Packers staff
Front office: President and chief executive officer – Bob Harlan; Executive vice president and Chief Operating Officer – John Jones; Vice president of Player Finance/General Counsel – Andrew Brandt; Vice president of football operations – Mark Hatley; Director of college scouting – John Dorsey; Director of pro personnel – Reggie McKenzie; Personnel analyst to general manager – John Schneider; Assistant director of college scouting – Shaun Herock; Assistant director of pro personnel – Sean Howard; Head coaches: Executive vice president/general manager/head coach – Mike Sherman; Assistant head coach/defensive backs – Bob Slowik; Offensive coaches: Offensive coordinator – Tom Rossley; Quarterbacks – Darrell Bevell; Running backs – Sylvester Croom; Wide receivers – Ray Sherman; Tight ends – Jeff Jagodzinski; Offensive line – Larry Beightol; Assistant offensive line – Joe Philbin; Offense Quality Control – Stan Drayton	Defensive coaches: Defensive coordinator – Ed Donatell; Defensive line – Jethro Franklin; Assistant defensive line – Brad Miller; Linebackers – Mark Duffner; Assistant Defensive Backs – Lionel Washington; Special teams coaches: Special Teams Coordinator – John Bonamego; Assistant special teams – Stan Drayton; Special Teams Consultant – Frank Novak; Strength and conditioning: Strength and conditioning – Barry Rubin; Strength and Conditioning Assistant – Mark Lovat; Weight Room Assistant – Vince Workman

=== Roster ===
2003 Green Bay Packers roster
Quarterbacks: 4 Brett Favre; 16 Craig Nall; 18 Doug Pederson; Running backs: 44 Najeh Davenport; 40 Tony Fisher; 30 Ahman Green; 33 William Henderson FB; 23 Nick Luchey FB; Wide receivers: 83 Antonio Chatman; 80 Donald Driver; 89 Robert Ferguson; 86 Antonio Freeman; 84 Javon Walker; Tight ends: 88 Bubba Franks; 87 David Martin; 85 Wesley Walls	Offensive linemen: 71 Kevin Barry OT; 76 Chad Clifton OT; 69 Brennan Curtin OT; 58 Mike Flanagan C; 62 Marco Rivera G; 67 Grey Ruegamer C; 79 Marcus Spriggs G; 65 Mark Tauscher OT; 68 Mike Wahle G; Defensive linemen: 93 Gilbert Brown DT; 94 Kabeer Gbaja-Biamila DE; 97 Cletidus Hunt DT; 74 Aaron Kampman DE; 75 Grady Jackson DT; 90 Chukie Nwokorie DE; 98 Kenny Peterson DT; 99 Jamal Reynolds DE; 96 Larry Smith DT	Linebackers: 56 Nick Barnett MLB; 59 Na'il Diggs OLB; 53 Paris Lenon OLB; 51 Torrance Marshall MLB; 50 Hannibal Navies OLB; 55 Marcus Wilkins OLB; Defensive backs: 20 Marques Anderson SS; 45 Derek Combs CB; 29 Curtis Fuller FS; 31 Al Harris CB; 27 Michael Hawthorne CB; 21 Bhawoh Jue SS; 34 Mike McKenzie CB; 42 Darren Sharper FS; 26 Erwin Swiney CB; 25 James Whitley CB; Special teams: 9 Josh Bidwell P; 60 Rob Davis LS; 8 Ryan Longwell K	Injured Reserve: -- Earl Cochran DE (IR); 24 Antuan Edwards S (IR); -- Carl Ford WR (IR); -- Bobby Jackson S (IR); 37 Chris Johnson CB (IR); 91 Joe Johnson DE (IR); 64 James Lee DT (IR); 82 Devin Lewis WR (IR); 95 Rod Walker DT (IR); 32 Bryant Westbrook CB (IR); 19 Travis Williams WR (NF-Inj.); Practice Squad: 41 Calvin Carlyle S; 28 Dahrran Diedrick RB; 73 Jason Jimenez OT; 54 Steve Josue OLB; 13 Frank Rice WR; 17 Scottie Vines WR (IR); Rookies in italics 53 active, 12 inactive, 5 practice squad

== Preseason ==
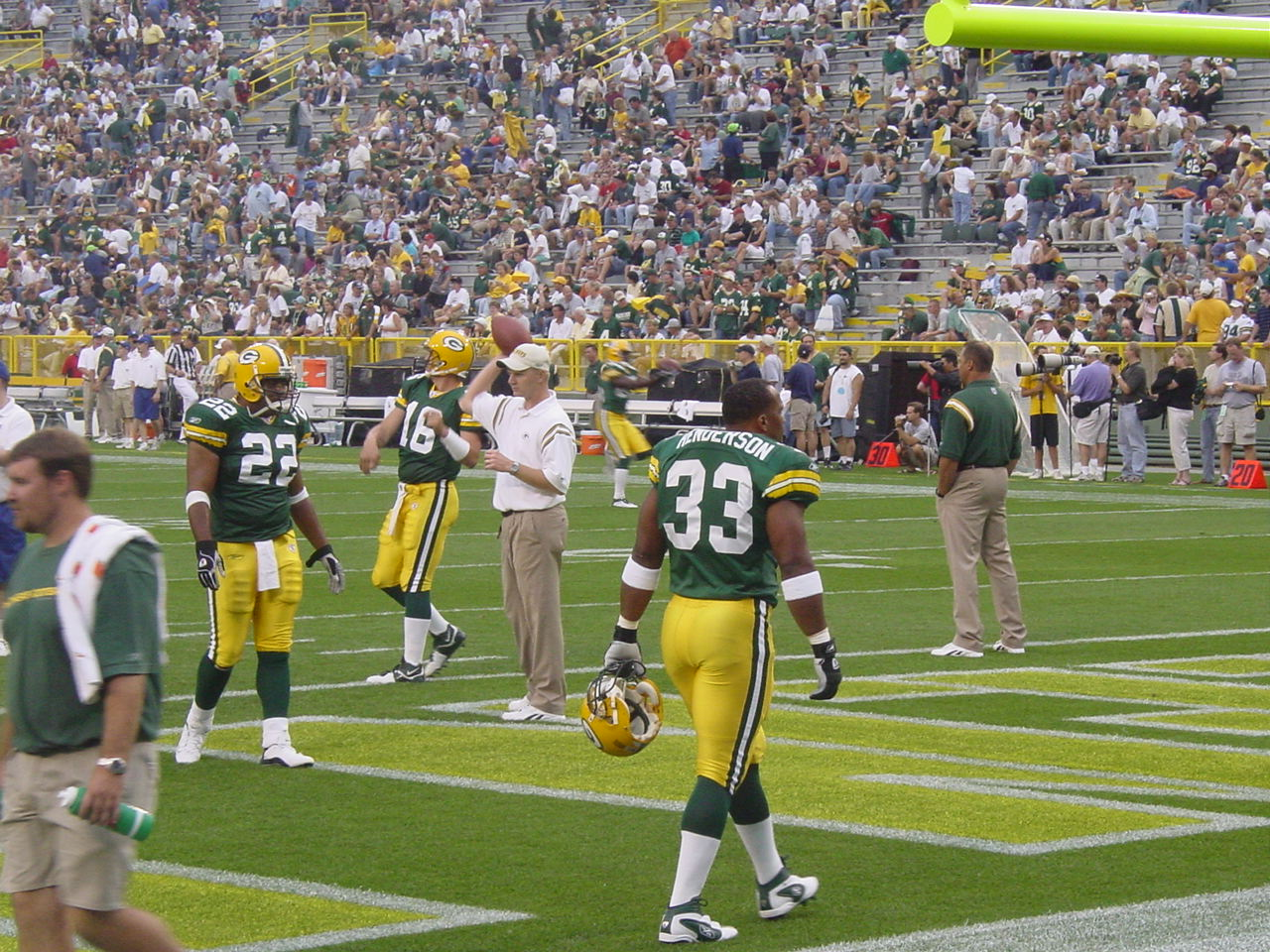
Luchey, Nall, and Henderson at the Tennessee preseason game

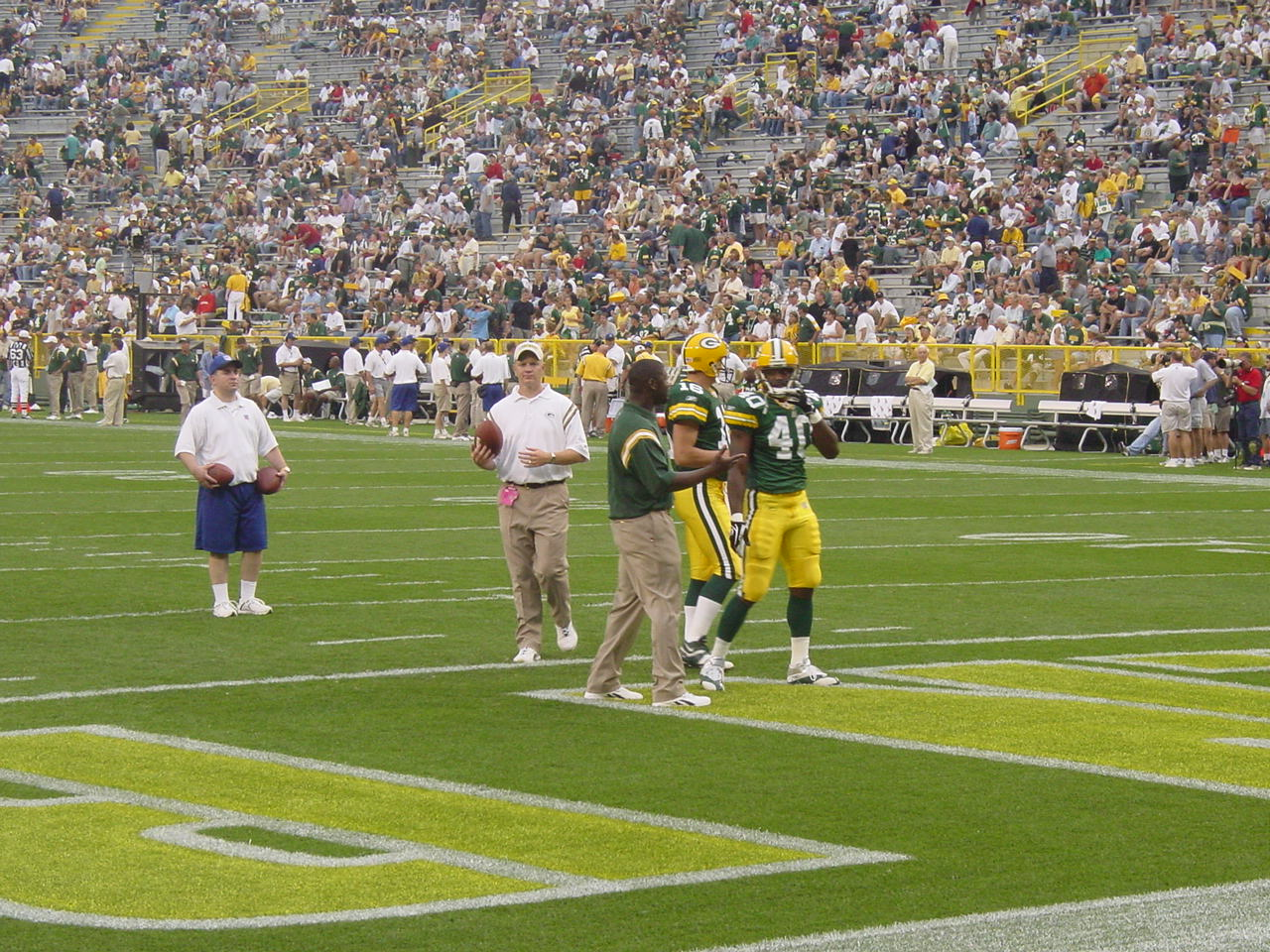
Tony Fisher and others, August 28

== Regular season ==
The Packers finished the season 10–6 and advanced to the Divisional round of the playoffs.

Week	Date	Opponent	Result	Game site	Attendance
1	September 7	**Minnesota Vikings**	**L** 25–30	Lambeau Field	70,505
2	September 14	**Detroit Lions**	**W** 31–6	Lambeau Field	70,244
3	September 21	at Arizona Cardinals	**L** 13–20	Sun Devil Stadium	58,784
4	September 29	at **Chicago Bears**	**W** 38–23	Soldier Field	61,500
5	October 5	Seattle Seahawks	**W** 35–13	Lambeau Field	70,365
6	October 12	Kansas City Chiefs	**L** 34–40 (OT)	Lambeau Field	70,407
7	October 19	at St. Louis Rams	**L** 24–34	Edward Jones Dome	66,201
8	Bye				
9	November 2	at **Minnesota Vikings**	**W** 30–27	Hubert H. Humphrey Metrodome	64,482
10	November 10	Philadelphia Eagles	**L** 14–17	Lambeau Field	70,291
11	November 16	at Tampa Bay Buccaneers	**W** 20–13	Raymond James Stadium	65,614
12	November 23	San Francisco 49ers	**W** 20–10	Lambeau Field	70,250
13	November 27	at **Detroit Lions**	**L** 14–22	Ford Field	62,123
14	December 7	**Chicago Bears**	**W** 34–21	Lambeau Field	70,458
15	December 14	at San Diego Chargers	**W** 38–21	Qualcomm Stadium	64,978
16	December 22	at Oakland Raiders	**W** 41–7	Network Associates Coliseum	62,298
17	December 28	Denver Broncos	**W** 31–3	Lambeau Field	70,299
Note: Intra-division opponents are in **bold** text

=== Game summaries ===
==== Week 1: vs Minnesota Vikings ====
Week One: Minnesota Vikings at Green Bay Packers – Game summary

Quarter	1	2	3	4	Total
**Vikings**	10	10	7	3	**30**
Packers	0	3	8	14	**25**

at Lambeau Field, Green Bay, Wisconsin

- Date: September 7
- Game time: 12:00pm local
- Game weather: clear, 71 °F (22 °C), 78% humidity, wind 4 miles per hour (6.4 km/h)
- Game attendance: 70,505
- Referee: Pete Morelli
- TV announcers (Fox): Kenny Albert, Brian Baldinger & Drew Smith

Game information

**First quarter**

- Min – John Avery 11-yard pass from Daunte Culpepper (Aaron Elling kick), 9:28 (Min 7–0)
- Min – Aaron Elling 22-yard field goal, 1:52 (Min 10–0)

**Second quarter**

- GB – Ryan Longwell 27-yard field goal, 11:02 (Min 10–3)
- Min – D'Wayne Bates 2-yard pass from Daunte Culpepper (Aaron Elling kick), 5:34 (Min 17–3)
- Min – Aaron Elling 46-yard field goal, 0:04 (Min 20–3)

**Third quarter**

- Min – Randy Moss 13-yard pass from Daunte Culpepper (Aaron Elling kick), 8:47 (Min 27–3)
- GB – Ahman Green 8-yard run (Bubba Franks pass from Brett Favre), 1:30 (Min 27–11)

**Fourth quarter**

- Min – Aaron Elling 34-yard field goal, 10:07 (Min 30–11)
- GB – Ahman Green 1-yard run (Ryan Longwell kick), 6:27 (Min 30–18)
- GB – Javon Walker 24-yard pass from Brett Favre (Ryan Longwell kick), 1:55 (Min 30–25)

**Top passers**

- Min – Daunte Culpepper: 15/30, 195 yds, 3 TD
- GB – Brett Favre: 25/41, 248 yds, 1 TD, 4 INT

**Top rushers**

- Min – Moe Williams: 22 car, 80 yds
- GB – Ahman Green: 15 car, 53 yds, 2 TD

**Top receivers**

- Min – Randy Moss: 9 rec, 150 yds, 1 TD
- GB – Javon Walker: 5 rec, 84 yds, 1 TD

**Team** – pass – rush – total – to

- Min – 183 – 154 – 337 – 2
- GB – 242 – 62 – 304 – 5

==== Week 2: vs Detroit Lions ====
Week Two: Detroit Lions at Green Bay Packers – Game summary

Quarter	1	2	3	4	Total
Lions	0	6	0	0	**6**
**Packers**	14	3	7	7	**31**

at Lambeau Field, Green Bay, Wisconsin

- Date: September 14
- Game time: 12:00pm local
- Game weather: clear, 63 °F (17 °C), 93% humidity, wind 12 miles per hour (19 km/h)
- Game attendance: 70,244
- Referee: Bernie Kukar
- TV announcers (Fox): Sam Rosen, Bill Maas & Chris Myers

Game information

**First quarter**

- GB – Ahman Green 65-yard run (Ryan Longwell kick), 14:08 (GB 7–0)
- GB – Tony Fisher 5-yard pass from Brett Favre (Ryan Longwell kick), 4:26 (GB 14–0)

**Second quarter**

- Det – Jason Hanson 22-yard field goal, 12:20 (GB 14–3)
- GB – Ryan Longwell 46-yard field goal, 8:22 (GB 17–3)
- Det – Jason Hanson 52-yard field goal, 0:00 (GB 17–6)

**Third quarter**

- GB – Robert Ferguson 14-yard pass Brett Favre (Ryan Longwell kick), 10:18 (GB 24–6)

**Fourth quarter**

- GB – Al Harris 56-yard interception return (Ryan Longwell kick), 10:18 (GB 31–6)

**Top passers**

- Det – Joey Harrington: 26/55, 241 yds, 3 INT
- GB – Brett Favre: 15/28, 132 yds, 2 TD, 1 INT

**Top rushers**

- Det – Shawn Bryson: 7 car, 43 yds
- GB – Ahman Green: 23 car, 160 yds, 1 TD

**Top receivers**

- Det – Shawn Bryson: 5 rec, 48 yds
- GB – Antonio Freeman: 4 rec, 32 yds

**Team** – pass – rush – total – to

- Det – 237 – 56 – 293 – 3
- GB – 132 – 200 – 332 – 2

==== Week 3: at Arizona Cardinals ====
Week Three: Green Bay Packers at Arizona Cardinals – Game summary

Quarter	1	2	3	4	Total
Packers	0	10	0	3	**13**
**Cardinals**	7	3	3	7	**20**

at Sun Devil Stadium, Phoenix, Arizona

- Date: September 21
- Game time: 3:05pm local
- Game weather: clear, 102 °F (39 °C), 7% humidity, wind 4 miles per hour (6.4 km/h)
- Game attendance: 58,784
- Referee: Mike Carey
- TV announcers (Fox): Kenny Albert, Brian Baldinger & Kevin McCabe

Game information

**First quarter**

- Ari – Jeff Blake 1-yard run (Bill Gramatica kick), 4:16 (Ari 7–0)

**Second quarter**

- GB – David Martin 4-yard pass from Brett Favre (Ryan Longwell kick), 6:44 (Tie 7–7)
- GB – Ryan Longwell 40-yard field goal, 1:17 (GB 10–7)
- Ari – Bill Gramatica 21-yard field goal, 0:05 (Tie 10–10)

**Third quarter**

- Ari – Bill Gramatica 37-yard field goal, 7:31 (Ari 13–10)

**Fourth quarter**

- GB – Ryan Longwell 40-yard field goal, 11:08 (Tie 13–13)
- Ari – James Hodgins 1-yard pass from Jeff Blake (Bill Gramatica kick), 3:59 (Ari 20–13)

**Top passers**

- GB – Brett Favre: 23/33, 245 yds, 1 TD, 1 INT
- Ari – Jeff Blake: 20/31, 273 yds, 1 TD, 1 INT

**Top rushers**

- GB – Ahman Green: 21 car, 53 yds
- Ari – Emmitt Smith: 20 car, 50 yds

**Top receivers**

- GB – William Henderson: 3 rec, 47 yds
- Ari – Anquan Boldin: 5 rec, 99 yds

**Team** – pass – rush – total – to

- GB – 245 – 66 – 311 – 2
- Ari – 273 – 81 – 354 – 1

==== Week 4: at Chicago Bears ====
Week Four: Green Bay Packers at Chicago Bears – Game summary

Quarter	1	2	3	4	Total
**Packers**	17	7	0	14	**38**
Bears	0	6	3	14	**23**

at Soldier Field, Chicago, Illinois

- Date: September 29
- Game time: 8:00pm local
- Game weather: clear, 58 °F (14 °C), 46% humidity, wind 3 miles per hour (4.8 km/h)
- Game attendance: 60,257
- Referee: Jeff Triplette
- TV announcers (ABC): Al Michaels, John Madden & Lisa Guerrero

Game information

**First quarter**

- GB – Ahman Green 60-yard run (Ryan Longwell kick), 11:55 (GB 7–0)
- GB – Ryan Longwell 34-yard field goal, 2:32 (GB 10–0)
- GB – Ahman Green 6-yard run (Ryan Longwell kick), 0:19 (GB 17–0)

**Second quarter**

- Chi – Paul Edinger 31-yard field goal, 9:07 (GB 17–3)
- GB – William Henderson 14-yard pass from Brett Favre (Ryan Longwell kick), 3:51 (GB 24–3)
- Chi – Paul Edinger 38-yard field goal, 0:48 (GB 24–6)

**Third quarter**

- Chi – Paul Edinger 41-yard field goal, 0:02 (GB 24–9)

**Fourth quarter**

- Chi – Anthony Thomas 67-yard run (Paul Edinger kick), 12:36 (GB 24–16)
- GB – Javon Walker 9-yard pass from Brett Favre (Ryan Longwell kick), 8:51 (GB 31–16)
- GB – Bubba Franks 1-yard pass from Brett Favre (Ryan Longwell kick), 4:21 (GB 38–16)
- Chi – Kordell Stewart 1-yard run (Paul Edinger kick), 1:28 (GB 38–23)

**Top passers**

- GB – Brett Favre: 21/29, 179 yds, 3 TD, 1 INT
- Chi – Kordell Stewart: 25/44, 201 yds, 2 INT

**Top rushers**

- GB – Ahman Green: 19 car, 176 yds, 2 TD
- Chi – Anthony Thomas: 13 car, 110 yds, 1 TD

**Top receivers**

- GB – Donald Driver: 4 rec, 50 yds
- Chi – Desmond Clark: 6 rec, 63 yds

**Team** – pass – rush – total – to

- GB – 193 – 187 – 380 – 1
- Chi – 180 – 181 – 361 – 2

==== Week 5: vs Seattle Seahawks ====
Week Five: Seattle Seahawks at Green Bay Packers – Game summary

Quarter	1	2	3	4	Total
Seahawks	7	6	0	0	**13**
**Packers**	7	14	14	0	**35**

at Lambeau Field, Green Bay, Wisconsin

- Date: October 5
- Game time: 12:00pm local
- Game weather: clear, 48 °F (9 °C), 49% humidity, wind 5 miles per hour (8.0 km/h)
- Game attendance: 70,365
- Referee: Larry Nemmers
- TV announcers (Fox): Dick Stockton, Daryl Johnston & Chris Myers

Game information

**First quarter**

- GB – Donald Driver 34-yard pass from Brett Favre (Ryan Longwell kick), 9:54 (GB 7–0)
- SEA – Shaun Alexander 1-yard run (Josh Brown kick), 5:31 (Tied 7–7)

**Second quarter**

- GB – Ahman Green 1-yard run (Ryan Longwell kick), 13:13 (GB 14–7)
- SEA – Josh Brown 27-yard field goal, 5:28 (GB 14–10)
- GB – Ahman Green 3-yard run (Ryan Longwell kick), 0:36 (GB 21–10)
- SEA – Josh Brown 58-yard field goal, 0:00 (GB 21–13)

**Third quarter**

- GB – Tony Fisher 11-yard run (Ryan Longwell kick), 11:09 (GB 28–13)
- GB – William Henderson 2-yard pass from Brett Favre (Ryan Longwell kick), 0:39 (GB 35–13)

**Fourth quarter**

- No scoring plays

**Top passers**

- SEA – Matt Hasselbeck: 23/39, 225 yds, 1 INT
- GB – Brett Favre: 19/25, 185 yds, 2 TD

**Top rushers**

- SEA – Shaun Alexander: 20 car, 102 yds, 1 TD
- GB – Ahman Green: 27 car, 118 yds, 2 TD

**Top receivers**

- SEA – Koren Robinson: 8 rec, 76 yds
- GB – Donald Driver: 7 rec, 72 yds, 1 TD

**Team** – pass – rush – total – to

- SEA – 215 – 128 – 343 – 2
- GB – 177 – 159 – 336 – 0

==== Week 6: vs Kansas City Chiefs ====
Week Six: Kansas City Chiefs at Green Bay Packers – Game summary

Quarter	1	2	3	4	OT	Total
**Chiefs**	7	7	0	20	6	**40**
Packers	14	7	10	3	0	**34**

at Lambeau Field, Green Bay, Wisconsin

- Date: October 12
- Game time: 12:00pm local
- Game weather: clear, 60 °F (16 °C), 57% humidity, wind 17 miles per hour (27 km/h)
- Game attendance: 70,407
- Referee: Ron Winter
- TV announcers (CBS): Dick Enberg, Dan Dierdorf & Bonnie Bernstein

Game information

**First quarter**

- GB – Bubba Franks 1-yard pass from Brett Favre (Ryan Longwell kick), 7:14 (GB 7–0)
- GB – Ahman Green 4-yard run (Ryan Longwell kick), 2:39 (GB 14–0)
- KC – Tony Gonzalez 26-yard pass from Trent Green (Morten Anderson kick), 0:36 (GB 14–7)

**Second quarter**

- KC – Johnnie Morton 10-yard pass from Trent Green (Morten Anderson kick), 9:16 (Tied 14–14)
- GB – Ahman Green 11-yard pass from Brett Favre (Ryan Longwell kick), 2:14 (GB 21–14)

**Third quarter**

- GB – Najeh Davenport 18-yard run (Ryan Longwell kick), 10:47 (GB 28–14)
- GB – Ryan Longwell 50-yard field goal, 6:01 (GB 31–14)

**Fourth quarter**

- KC – Priest Holmes 1-yard run (Morten Anderson kick), 12:20 (GB 31–21)
- KC – Jerome Woods 79-yard interception return (Morten Anderson kick), 8:46 (GB 31–28)
- KC – Morten Anderson 34-yard field goal, 5:41 (Tied 31–31)
- GB – Ryan Longwell 34-yard field goal, 2:43 (GB 34–31)
- KC – Morten Anderson 31-yard field goal, 0:01 (Tied 34–34)

**Overtime**

- KC – Eddie Kennison 51-yard pass from Trent Green (Morten Anderson kick), 8:42 (KC 40–34)

**Top passers**

- KC – Trent Green: 27/45, 400 yds, 3 TD
- GB – Brett Favre: 25/36, 272 yds, 2 TD, 1 INT

**Top rushers**

- KC – Priest Holmes: 22 car, 81 yds, 1 TD
- GB – Ahman Green: 26 car, 139 yds, 1 TD

**Top receivers**

- KC – Tony Gonzalez: 4 rec, 121 yds, 1 TD
- GB – Wesley Walls: 4 rec, 64 yds

**Team** – pass – rush – total – to

- KC – 400 – 82 – 482 – 0
- GB – 257 – 183 – 400 – 2

==== Week 7: at St. Louis Rams ====
Week Seven: Green Bay Packers at St. Louis Rams – Game summary

Quarter	1	2	3	4	Total
Packers	3	7	7	7	**24**
**Rams**	14	7	7	6	**34**

at Edward Jones Dome, St. Louis, Missouri

- Date: October 19
- Game time: 12:00pm local
- Game weather: none, (Dome)
- Game attendance: 66,201
- Referee: Pete Morelli
- TV announcers (Fox): Dan Miller & Brian Baldinger

Game information

**First quarter**

- GB – Ryan Longwell 33-yard field goal, 10:08 (GB 3–0)
- Stl – Torry Holt 39-yard pass from Marc Bulger (Jeff Wilkins kick), 7:24 (Stl 7–3)
- Stl – Arlen Harris 33-yard run (Jeff Wilkins kick), 3:47 (Stl 14–3)

**Second quarter**

- GB – Ahman Green 21-yard pass from Brett Favre (Ryan Longwell kick), 13:23 (Stl 14–10)
- Stl – Torry Holt 9-yard pass from Marc Bulger, 0:57 (Stl 21–10)

**Third quarter**

- GB – William Henderson 1-yard pass from Brett Favre (Ryan Longwell kick), 11:56 (Stl 21–17)
- Stl – Dane Looker 20-yard pass from Marc Bulger (Jeff Wilkins kick), 4:11 (Stl 28–17)

**Fourth quarter**

- Stl – Jeff Wilkins 39-yard field goal, 4:52 (Stl 31–17)
- Stl – Jeff Wilkins 43-yard field goal, 2:56 (Stl 34–17)
- GB – Najeh Davenport 76-yard run (Ryan Longwell kick), 1:48 (Stl 34–24)

**Top passers**

- GB – Brett Favre: 23/32, 268 yds, 2 TD, 1 INT
- Stl – Marc Bulger: 22/34, 247 yds, 3 TD, 2 INT

**Top rushers**

- GB – Najeh Davenport: 5 car, 74 yds, 1 TD
- Stl – Arlen Harris: 18 car, 85 yds, 1 TD

**Top receivers**

- GB – Ahman Green: 6 rec, 62 yds, 1 TD
- Stl – Isaac Bruce: 9 rec, 129 yds

**Team** – pass – rush – total – to

- GB – 256 – 116 – 372 – 4
- Stl – 239 – 131 – 370 – 2

==== Week 9: at Minnesota Vikings ====
Week Nine: Green Bay Packers at Minnesota Vikings – Game summary

Quarter	1	2	3	4	Total
**Packers**	6	14	0	10	**30**
Vikings	7	7	6	7	**27**

at Hubert H. Humphrey Metrodome, Minneapolis, Minnesota

- Date: November 2
- Game time: 7:30pm local
- Game weather: none, (Dome)
- Game attendance: 64,482
- Referee: Bernie Kukar
- TV announcers (ESPN): Mike Patrick, Joe Theismann & Suzy Kolber

Game information

**First quarter**

- GB – Ryan Longwell 21-yard field goal, 11:14 (GB 3–0)
- Min – Randy Moss 43-yard pass from Daunte Culpepper (Aaron Elling kick), 8:33 (Min 7–3)
- GB – Ryan Longwell 43-yard field goal, 5:42 (Min 7–6)

**Second quarter**

- GB – Ahman Green 5-yard pass from Brett Favre (Ryan Longwell kick), 12:18 (GB 13–7)
- Min – Jim Kleinsasser 4-yard pass from Daunte Culpepper (Aaron Elling kick), 2:07 (Min 14–13)
- GB – Javon Walker 12-yard pass from Brett Favre (Ryan Longwell kick), 0:21 (GB 20–14)

**Third quarter**

- Min – Aaron Elling 47-yard field goal, 8:53 (GB 20–17)
- Min – Aaron Elling 37-yard field goal, 2:26 (Tied 20–20)

**Fourth quarter**

- GB – Javon Walker 12-yard pass from Brett Favre (Ryan Longwell kick), 13:14 (GB 27–20)
- GB – Ryan Longwell 27-yard field goal, 2:37 (GB 30–20)
- Min – Daunte Culpepper 1-yard run (Aaron Elling kick), 0:33 (GB 30–27)

**Top passers**

- GB – Brett Favre: 18/28, 194 yds, 3 TD, 1 INT
- Min – Daunte Culpepper: 21/34, 202 yds, 2 TD

**Top rushers**

- GB – Ahman Green: 21 car, 137 yds
- Min – Moe Williams: 12 car, 63 yds

**Top receivers**

- GB – Ahman Green: 5 rec, 52 yds, 1 TD
- Min – Randy Moss: 6 rec, 87 yds, 1 TD

**Team** – pass – rush – total – to

- GB – 190 – 261 – 451 – 1
- Min – 198 – 125 – 323 – 0

==== Week 10: vs Philadelphia Eagles ====
Week Ten: Philadelphia Eagles at Green Bay Packers – Game summary

Quarter	1	2	3	4	Total
**Eagles**	0	0	3	14	**17**
Packers	0	7	0	7	**14**

at Lambeau Field, Green Bay, Wisconsin

- Date: November 10
- Game time: 8:00pm local
- Game weather: clear, 39 °F (4 °C), 96% humidity, wind 8 miles per hour (13 km/h)
- Game attendance: 70,291
- Referee: Bill Carollo
- TV announcers (ABC): Al Michaels, John Madden & Lisa Guerrero

Game information

**First quarter**

- No scoring plays

**Second quarter**

- GB – Ahman Green 24-yard pass from Brett Favre (Ryan Longwell kick), 0:40 (GB 7–0)

**Third quarter**

- Phi – David Akers 21-yard field goal, 9:29 (GB 7–3)

**Fourth quarter**

- Phi – Donovan McNabb 1-yard run (David Akers kick), 9:22 (Phi 10–7)
- GB – Ahman Green 45-yard run (Ryan Longwell kick), 7:03 (GB 14–10)
- Phi – Todd Pinkston 6-yard pass from Donovan McNabb (David Akers kick), 0:27 (Phi 17–14)

**Top passers**

- Phi – Donovan McNabb: 15/31, 198 yds, 1 TD
- GB – Brett Favre: 14/22, 109 yds, 1 TD, 1 INT

**Top rushers**

- Phi – Duce Staley: 10 car, 53 yds
- GB – Ahman Green: 29 car, 192 yds, 1 TD

**Top receivers**

- Phi – James Thrash: 2 rec, 55 yds
- GB – Ahman Green: 3 rec, 32 yds, 1 TD

**Team** – pass – rush – total – to

- Phi – 190 – 92 – 282 – 0
- GB – 68 – 241 – 309 – 3

Five days before the game, the Packers claimed defensive tackle Grady Jackson off waivers from the Saints. Jackson helped the Packers allow only 95.38 rushing yards per game over the final 8 games, after allowing over 117 yards per game in the first 8 games. Jackson signed a two-year contract extension on December 29, 2003.

==== Week 11: at Tampa Bay Buccaneers ====
Week Eleven: Green Bay Packers at Tampa Bay Buccaneers – Game summary

Quarter	1	2	3	4	Total
**Packers**	7	6	0	7	**20**
Buccaneers	0	6	7	0	**13**

at Raymond James Stadium, Tampa, Florida

- Date: November 16
- Game time: 3:15pm local
- Game weather: clear, 80 °F (27 °C), 47% humidity, wind 5 miles per hour (8.0 km/h)
- Game attendance: 65,614
- Referee: Walt Coleman
- TV announcers (Fox): Joe Buck, Troy Aikman, Cris Collinsworth & Pam Oliver

Game information

**First quarter**

- GB – Tony Fisher 5-yard pass from Brett Favre (Ryan Longwell kick), 7:31 (GB 7–0)

**Second quarter**

- GB – Ryan Longwell 31-yard field goal, 13:04 (GB 10–0)
- TB – Martin Gramatica 24-yard field goal, 10:36 (GB 10–3)
- GB – Ryan Longwell 33-yard field goal, 7:52 (GB 13–3)
- TB – Martin Gramatica 47-yard field goal, 0:00 (GB 13–6)

**Third quarter**

- TB – Keenan McCardell 3-yard pass from Brad Johnson (Martin Gramatica kick), 12:29 (Tied 13–13)

**Fourth quarter**

- GB – Ahman Green 1-yard run (Ryan Longwell kick), 8:54 (GB 20–13)

**Top passers**

- GB – Brett Favre: 13/28, 92 yds, 1 TD, 1 INT
- TB – Brad Johnson: 17/28, 149 yds, 1 TD, 2 INT

**Top rushers**

- GB – Ahman Green: 21 car, 109 yds, 1 TD
- TB – Thomas Jones: 9 car, 134 yds

**Top receivers**

- GB – Robert Ferguson: 4 rec, 46 yds
- TB – Keenan McCardell: 5 rec, 55 yds, 1 TD

**Team** – pass – rush – total – to

- GB – 92 – 190 – 282 – 1
- TB – 131 – 154 – 285 – 3

==== Week 12: vs San Francisco 49ers ====
Week Twelve: San Francisco 49ers at Green Bay Packers – Game summary

Quarter	1	2	3	4	Total
49ers	0	3	7	0	**10**
**Packers**	7	10	0	3	**20**

at Lambeau Field, Green Bay, Wisconsin

- Date: November 23
- Game time: 12:00pm local
- Game weather: clear, 38 °F (3 °C), 100% humidity, wind 10 miles per hour (16 km/h)
- Game attendance: 70,250
- Referee: Jeff Triplette
- TV announcers (Fox): Dick Stockton, Daryl Johnston & Tony Siragusa

Game information

**First quarter**

- GB – Javon Walker 66-yard pass from Brett Favre (Ryan Longwell kick), 11:31 (GB 7–0)

**Second quarter**

- GB – Robert Ferguson 16-yard pass Brett Favre (Ryan Longwell kick), 8:00 (GB 14–0)
- SF – Todd Peterson 24-yard field goal, 2:00 (GB 14–3)
- GB – Ryan Longwell 38-yard field goal, 0:00 (GB 17–3)

**Third quarter**

- SF – Terrell Owens 24 yard pass from Tim Rattay (Todd Peterson kick), 1:33 (GB 17–10)

**Fourth quarter**

- GB – Ryan Longwell 37-yard field goal, 7:44 (GB 20–10)

**Top passers**

- SF – Tim Rattay: 14/30, 142 yds, 1 TD, 1 INT
- GB – Brett Favre: 10/15, 138 yds, 2 TD, 3 INT

**Top rushers**

- SF – Garrison Hearst: 16 car, 59 yds
- GB – Ahman Green: 27 car, 154 yds

**Top receivers**

- SF – Terrell Owens: 5 rec, 49 yds, 1 TD
- GB – Javon Walker: 1 rec, 66 yds, 1 TD

**Team** – pass – rush – total – to

- SF – 119 – 73 – 192 – 1
- GB – 136 – 243 – 379 – 3

==== Week 13: at Detroit Lions ====
Week Thirteen: Green Bay Packers at Detroit Lions – Game summary

Quarter	1	2	3	4	Total
Packers	0	7	7	0	**14**
**Lions**	10	3	0	9	**22**

at Ford Field, Detroit, Michigan

- Date: November 27
- Game time: 11:30am local
- Game weather: none, (Dome)
- Game attendance: 62,123
- Referee: Ron Winter
- TV announcers (Fox): Joe Buck, Troy Aikman, Cris Collinsworth & Pam Oliver

Game information

**First quarter**

- Det – Shawn Bryson 6-yard run (Jason Hanson kick), 8:05 (Det 7–0)
- Det – Jason Hanson 42-yard field goal, 0:33 (Det 10–0)

**Second quarter**

- GB – Bubba Franks 5-yard pass from Brett Favre (Ryan Longwell kick), 10:27 (Det 10–7)
- Det – Jason Hanson 28-yard field goal, 2:37 (Det 13–7)

**Third quarter**

- GB – Javon Walker 45-yard pass from Brett Favre (Ryan Longwell kick), 3:48 (GB 14–13)

**Fourth quarter**

- Det – Jason Hanson 49-yard field goal, 13:09 (Det 16–14)
- Det – Jason Hanson 46-yard field goal, 9:17 (Det 19–14)
- Det – Jason Hanson 32-yard field goal, 3:34 (Det 22–14)

**Top passers**

- GB – Brett Favre: 23/37, 296 yds, 2 TD, 3 INT
- Det – Joey Harrington: 21/32, 183 yds, 1 INT

**Top rushers**

- GB – Ahman Green: 13 car, 57 yds
- Det – Shawn Bryson: 16 car, 50 yds, 1 TD

**Top receivers**

- GB – Javon Walker: 3 rec, 93 yds, 1 TD
- Det – Az-Zahir Hakim: 6 rec, 65 yds

**Team** – pass – rush – total – to

- GB – 268 – 52 – 320 – 5
- Det – 172 – 94 – 266 – 1

==== Week 14: vs Chicago Bears ====
Week Fourteen: Chicago Bears at Green Bay Packers – Game summary

Quarter	1	2	3	4	Total
Bears	14	0	0	7	**21**
**Packers**	0	13	6	15	**34**

at Lambeau Field, Green Bay, Wisconsin

- Date: December 7
- Game time: 12:00pm local
- Game weather: clear, 35 °F (2 °C), 78% humidity, wind 16 miles per hour (26 km/h)
- Game attendance: 70,458
- Referee: Ed Hochuli
- TV announcers (Fox): Dick Stockton, Daryl Johnston & Dan Jiggetts

Game information

**First quarter**

- Chi – Marty Booker 61-yard pass from Kordell Stewart (Paul Edinger kick), 1:46 (Chi 7–0)
- Chi – Lance Briggs 45-yard interception return (Paul Edinger kick), 0:50 (Chi 14–0)

**Second quarter**

- GB – Ryan Longwell 24-yard field goal, 11:12 (Chi 14–3)
- GB – Ryan Longwell 38-yard field goal, 9:57 (Chi 14–6)
- GB – Javon Walker 22-yard pass from Brett Favre (Ryan Longwell kick), 2:43 (Chi 14–13)

**Third quarter**

- GB – Ryan Longwell 35-yard field goal, 6:52 (GB 16–14)
- GB – Ryan Longwell 45-yard field goal, 0:43 (GB 19–14)

**Fourth quarter**

- GB – Mike McKenzie 90-yard interception return (Bubba Franks pass from Brett Favre), 9:16 (GB 27–14)
- GB – Ahman Green 2-yard run (Ryan Longwell kick), 2:26 (GB 34–14)
- Chi – Jerry Azumah 88-yard kickoff return (Paul Edinger kick), 2:13 (GB 34–21)

**Top passers**

- Chi – Kordell Stewart: 17/40, 256 yds, 1 TD, 3 INT
- GB – Brett Favre: 22/33, 210 yds, 1 TD, 1 INT

**Top rushers**

- Chi – Anthony Thomas: 9 car, 22 yds
- GB – Ahman Green: 30 car, 80 yds, 1 TD

**Top receivers**

- Chi – Marty Booker: 5 rec, 115 yds, 1 TD
- GB – Robert Ferguson: 7 rec, 79 yds

**Team** – pass – rush – total – to

- Chi – 231 – 44 – 275 – 5
- GB – 210 – 97 – 307 – 1

==== Week 15: at San Diego Chargers ====
Week Fifteen: Green Bay Packers at San Diego Chargers – Game summary

Quarter	1	2	3	4	Total
**Packers**	7	10	0	21	**38**
Chargers	3	0	3	15	**21**

at Qualcomm Stadium, San Diego, California

- Date: December 14
- Game time: 3:15pm local
- Game weather: clear, 61 °F (16 °C), 52% humidity, wind 8 miles per hour (13 km/h)
- Game attendance: 64,978
- Referee: Ron Blum
- TV announcers (Fox): Sam Rosen, Bill Maas & Drew Smith

Game information

**First quarter**

- GB – Ahman Green 4-yard run (Ryan Longwell kick), 10:59 (GB 7–0)
- SD – Steve Christie 20-yard field goal, 6:02 (GB 7–3)

**Second quarter**

- GB – Ryan Longwell 32-yard field goal, 8:59 (GB 10–3)
- GB – Donald Driver 7-yard pass from Brett Favre (Ryan Longwell kick), 0:33 (GB 17–3)

**Third quarter**

- SD – Steve Christie 26-yard field goal, 8:52 (GB 17–6)

**Fourth quarter**

- SD – LaDainian Tomlinson 7-yard pass from Drew Brees (David Boston pass from Drew Brees), 14:56 (GB 17–14)
- SD – LaDainian Tomlinson 68-yard pass from Drew Brees (Steve Christie kick), 12:10 (SD 21–17)
- GB – Robert Ferguson 40-yard pass from Brett Favre (Ryan Longwell kick), 11:18 (GB 24–21)
- GB – Ahman Green 1-yard pass from Brett Favre (Ryan Longwell kick), 8:37 (GB 31–21)
- GB – Robert Ferguson 16-yard pass from Brett Favre (Ryan Longwell kick), 3:58 (GB 38–21)

**Top passers**

- GB – Brett Favre: 23/33, 278 yds, 4 TD, 1 INT
- SD – Drew Brees: 28/48, 363 yds, 2 TD, 1 INT

**Top rushers**

- GB – Ahman Green: 19 car, 75 yds, 1 TD
- SD – LaDainian Tomlinson: 20 car, 51 yds

**Top receivers**

- GB – Donald Driver: 8 rec, 112 yds, 1 TD
- SD – LaDainian Tomlinson: 11 rec, 144 yds, 2 TD

**Team** – pass – rush – total – to

- GB – 278 – 83 – 361 – 1
- SD – 336 – 88 – 424 – 4

==== Week 16: at Oakland Raiders ====
Week Sixteen: Green Bay Packers at Oakland Raiders – Game summary

Quarter	1	2	3	4	Total
**Packers**	14	17	3	7	**41**
Raiders	7	0	0	0	**7**

at Network Associates Coliseum, Oakland, California

- Date: December 22
- Game time: 8:00pm local
- Game weather: clear, 54 °F (12 °C), 83% humidity, wind 6 miles per hour (9.7 km/h)
- Game attendance: 62,298
- Referee: Tony Corrente
- TV announcers (ABC): Al Michaels, John Madden & Lisa Guerrero

Game information

**First quarter**

- GB – Wesley Walls 22-yard pass from Brett Favre (Ryan Longwell kick), 9:18 (GB 7–0)
- GB – Javon Walker 23-yard pass from Brett Favre (Ryan Longwell kick), 5:17 (GB 14–0)
- Oak – Charlie Garner 25-yard run (Sebastian Janikowski kick), 2:03 (GB 14–7)

**Second quarter**

- GB – Ryan Longwell 31-yard field goal, 11:35 (GB 17–7)
- GB – Javon Walker 43-yard pass from Brett Favre (Ryan Longwell kick), 7:06 (GB 24–7)
- GB – David Martin 6-yard pass from Brett Favre (Ryan Longwell kick), 0:54 (GB 31–7)

**Third quarter**

- GB – Ryan Longwell 27-yard field goal, 13:00 (GB 34–7)

**Fourth quarter**

- GB – Ahman Green 7-yard run (Ryan Longwell kick), 4:46 (GB 41–7)

**Top passers**

- GB – Brett Favre: 22/30, 399 yds, 4 TD
- Oak – Rick Mirer: 12/23, 114 yds, 1 INT

**Top rushers**

- GB – Ahman Green: 24 car, 127 yds, 1 TD
- Oak – Tyrone Wheatley: 10 car, 56 yds

**Top receivers**

- GB – Javon Walker: 4 rec, 124 yds, 2 TD
- Oak – Jerry Rice: 10 rec, 159 yds

**Team** – pass – rush – total – to

- GB – 392 – 156 – 548 – 0
- Oak – 194 – 104 – 298 – 3

The day before the game, Brett Favre's father Irvin died suddenly of a heart attack. Favre elected to play and threw four touchdowns in the first half, and 399 yards in a 41–7 blowout win over the Raiders. After the game, he said, "I knew that my dad would have wanted me to play. I love him so much and I love this game. It's meant a great deal to me, to my dad, to my family, and I didn't expect this kind of performance. But I know he was watching tonight."

==== Week 17: vs Denver Broncos ====
Week Seventeen: Denver Broncos at Green Bay Packers – Game summary

Quarter	1	2	3	4	Total
Broncos	0	0	3	0	**3**
**Packers**	7	3	7	14	**31**

at Lambeau Field, Green Bay, Wisconsin

- Date: December 28
- Game time: 3:15pm local
- Game weather: clear, 45 °F (7 °C), 89% humidity, wind 15 miles per hour (24 km/h)
- Game attendance: 70,299
- Referee: Bill Carollo
- TV announcers (CBS): Greg Gumbel, Phil Simms & Armen Keteyian

Game information

**First quarter**

- GB – Bubba Franks 2-yard pass from Brett Favre (Ryan Longwell kick), 8:49 (GB 7–0)

**Second quarter**

- GB – Ryan Longwell 33-yard field goal, 4:43 (GB 10–0)

**Third quarter**

- Den – Jason Elam 31-yard field goal, 4:00 (Tied 10–3)
- GB – Ahman Green 2-yard run (Ryan Longwell kick), 1:35 (GB 17–3)

**Fourth quarter**

- GB – Ahman Green 98-yard run (Ryan Longwell kick), 13:18 (GB 24–3)
- GB – Marcus Wilkins 0-yard fumble return (Ryan Longwell kick), 13:10 (GB 31–3)

**Top passers**

- Den – Danny Kanell: 9/18, 61 yds, 1 INT
- GB – Brett Favre: 12/21, 116 yds, 1 TD, 1 INT

**Top rushers**

- Den – Quentin Griffin: 21 car, 74 yds
- GB – Ahman Green: 20 car, 218 yds, 2 TD

**Top receivers**

- Den – Jeb Putzier: 4 rec, 34 yds
- GB – Javon Walker: 3 rec, 41 yds

**Team** – pass – rush – total – to

- Den – 102 – 114 – 216 – 3
- GB – 104 – 262 – 366 – 1

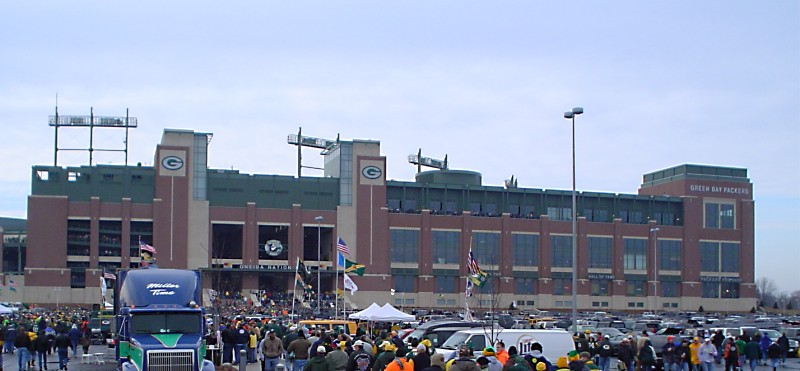
Lambeau Field on a game day, December 2003

With the blowout win, along with the Vikings' loss to the Cardinals, the Packers clinched the NFC North.

== Playoffs ==
=== vs. Seattle Seahawks ===
Quarter	1	2	3	4	OT	Total
Seahawks	3	3	14	7	0	27
Packers	0	13	0	14	6	33

at Lambeau Field, Green Bay, Wisconsin

- Game time: 1:00 p.m. EST/12:00 p.m. CST
- Game weather: 20 °F (−7 °C), cloudy
- Game attendance: 71,457
- Referee: Bernie Kukar
- TV announcers (Fox): Joe Buck (play-by-play), Troy Aikman, Cris Collinsworth (color commentators), and Chris Myers (sideline reporter)

Packers defensive back Al Harris returned an interception 52 yards for the game-winning touchdown. The game was sent into overtime on Seattle running back Shaun Alexander's third touchdown of the day. Ahman Green scored two touchdowns for Green Bay and Bubba Franks caught a 23-yard touchdown in the second quarter. The game is memorable for Seahawks quarterback Matt Hasselbeck's ironic comment after winning the coin toss for the start of overtime, telling the referee "We want the ball and we're going to score!" It remains one of two times in NFL history that a playoff game has ended with a defensive touchdown in overtime (the other being the January 10, 2010 Wild Card game between the Cardinals and the Packers).

Quarterback Brett Favre completed 26 of 38 passes for 319 yards and a touchdown.

This would be the last playoff win for the Packers without Aaron Rodgers until 2023 when Jordan Love led the team past the Cowboys 48–32. Despite the close final, the Packers led 27–0 late in the second quarter. Favre's last playoff win would come in 2007 when Green Bay beat Seattle in the Divisional Round 42–20 before falling to the New York Giants in the NFC Championship the following week.

=== vs. Philadelphia Eagles ===
Quarter	1	2	3	4	OT	Total
Packers	14	0	0	3	0	17
Eagles	0	7	0	10	3	20

at Lincoln Financial Field, Philadelphia, Pennsylvania

- Game time: 4:30 p.m. EST
- Game weather: 25 °F (−4 °C), clear
- Game attendance: 67,707
- Referee: Ed Hochuli
- TV announcers (Fox): Joe Buck (play-by-play), Troy Aikman, Cris Collinsworth (color commentators), and Pam Oliver (sideline reporter)

Ahman Green's franchise postseason record 156 rushing yards was not enough to lift the Packers to victory. Facing fourth down and 26 yards to go, with 1:12 left in the fourth quarter and the Packers leading 17–14, Eagles quarterback Donovan McNabb completed a 28-yard pass to Freddie Mitchell on a famous play now known as "4th and 26". The play set up David Akers' 37-yard field goal to send the game into overtime. In the overtime Favre's deep pass was intercepted, and Akers then kicked a 31-yard field goal, giving the Eagles the victory.

McNabb had a spectacular performance in the game, completing 21 of 39 passes for 248 yards and 2 touchdowns, while also rushing for 107 yards on 11 carries.

== Standings ==
NFC North
	W	L	T	PCT	DIV	CONF	PF	PA	STK
^{(4)} Green Bay Packers	10	6	0	.625	4–2	7–5	442	307	W4
Minnesota Vikings	9	7	0	.563	4–2	7–5	416	353	L1
Chicago Bears	7	9	0	.438	2–4	4–8	283	346	L1
Detroit Lions	5	11	0	.313	2–4	4–8	270	379	W1

== Awards and honors ==
- Brett Favre, NFC Leader, Completion Percentage (65.4)
- Brett Favre, NFC Leader, Touchdown Passes (32)
