= NFL 100 Greatest Games =

Selection of American football games

The National Football League 100 Greatest Games was voted on by a panel consisting of media members, former players and league personnel in 2019 to honor the greatest games of the first 100 years of the National Football League (NFL).

== Selection process ==
The games were chosen by a panel of 26 voters—coaches, team and front office executives, former players and members of the media—between April and June 2018. New England Patriots head coach Bill Belichick and Pro Football Hall of Fame head coach and former color commentator John Madden, both voters, were in charge of looking over film and issuing a report to the committee on players in the early years of the league.

The games were unveiled over six weeks on NFL Network by host Rich Eisen alongside Cris Collinsworth from NBC Sports and Belichick.

== NFL 100 Greatest Games ==
Rank	Year	Teams	Week/Playoffs	Nickname
1	1958	Baltimore Colts vs. New York Giants	NFL Championship Game	Greatest Game Ever Played
2	1981	San Francisco 49ers vs. Dallas Cowboys	NFC Championship Game	The Catch
3	1967	Green Bay Packers vs. Dallas Cowboys	NFL Championship Game	The Ice Bowl
4	1981	San Diego Chargers vs. Miami Dolphins	AFC Divisional Round	Epic in Miami
5	2007	New York Giants vs. New England Patriots	Super Bowl XLII	The Helmet Catch
6	1968	New York Jets vs. Baltimore Colts	Super Bowl III	The Guarantee
7	1992	Buffalo Bills vs. Houston Oilers	AFC Wild Card	The Comeback
8	2014	New England Patriots vs. Seattle Seahawks	Super Bowl XLIX	The Interception
9	2016	New England Patriots vs. Atlanta Falcons	Super Bowl LI	28–3
10	1990	New York Giants vs. Buffalo Bills	Super Bowl XXV	Wide Right
11	1986	Denver Broncos vs. Cleveland Browns	AFC Championship Game	The Drive
12	2008	Pittsburgh Steelers vs. Arizona Cardinals	Super Bowl XLIII	
13	1972	Pittsburgh Steelers vs. Oakland Raiders	AFC Divisional Round	The Immaculate Reception
14	2017	Philadelphia Eagles vs. New England Patriots	Super Bowl LII	Philly Special
15	2001	New England Patriots vs. Oakland Raiders	AFC Divisional Round	The Tuck Rule
16	1999	St. Louis Rams vs. Tennessee Titans	Super Bowl XXXIV	One Yard Short
17	1978	Pittsburgh Steelers vs. Dallas Cowboys	Super Bowl XIII	Battle of Champions
18	1971	Kansas City Chiefs vs. Miami Dolphins	AFC Divisional Round	The NFL's Longest Game
19	1988	San Francisco 49ers vs. Cincinnati Bengals	Super Bowl XXIII	Isn't that John Candy?
20	2001	New England Patriots vs. St. Louis Rams	Super Bowl XXXVI	A Dynasty Born
21	2006	Indianapolis Colts vs. New England Patriots	AFC Championship Game	Peyton's Revenge
22	1987	Denver Broncos vs. Cleveland Browns	AFC Championship Game	The Fumble
23	1974	Oakland Raiders vs. Miami Dolphins	AFC Divisional Round	The Sea of Hands
24	2017	Minnesota Vikings vs. New Orleans Saints	NFC Divisional Round	Minneapolis Miracle
25	1990	San Francisco 49ers vs. New York Giants	NFC Championship Game	There Will Be No Three-Peat
26	1999	Tennessee Titans vs. Buffalo Bills	AFC Wild Card	Music City Miracle
27	1997	Green Bay Packers vs. Denver Broncos	Super Bowl XXXII	This One's for John
28	1977	Baltimore Colts vs. Oakland Raiders	AFC Divisional Round	Ghost to the Post
29	1985	Miami Dolphins vs. Chicago Bears	Week 13	No Perfect Season
30	2012	Baltimore Ravens vs. San Francisco 49ers	Super Bowl XLVII	The Blackout Bowl/Harbaugh Bowl
31	2015	Arizona Cardinals vs. Green Bay Packers	NFC Divisional Round	Hail Larry
32	1950	Cleveland Browns vs. Los Angeles Rams	NFL Championship Game	
33	2018	Kansas City Chiefs vs. Los Angeles Rams	Week 11	Highest scoring game of all time
34	1998	Minnesota Vikings vs. Atlanta Falcons	NFC Championship Game	Andersen and Anderson
35	1972	Dallas Cowboys vs. San Francisco 49ers	NFC Divisional Round	Staubach 15-point comeback
36	2018	Kansas City Chiefs vs. New England Patriots	AFC Championship Game	Brady vs. Mahomes
37	2003	New England Patriots vs. Carolina Panthers	Super Bowl XXXVIII	
38	1966	Dallas Cowboys vs. Green Bay Packers	NFL Championship Game	
39	2002	New York Giants vs. San Francisco 49ers	NFC Wild Card	One Wild Finish
40	2012	Denver Broncos vs. Baltimore Ravens	AFC Divisional Round	Mile High Miracle
41	1968	New York Jets vs. Oakland Raiders	Week 11	The Heidi Game
42	2009	Minnesota Vikings vs. New Orleans Saints	NFC Championship Game	Favre's Final Playoff Game
43	2000	New York Jets vs. Miami Dolphins	Week 8	Monday Night Miracle
44	2014	Seattle Seahawks vs. Green Bay Packers	NFC Championship Game	Fourth Quarter Comeback
45	1975	Dallas Cowboys vs. Pittsburgh Steelers	Super Bowl X	
46	1998	San Francisco 49ers vs. Green Bay Packers	NFC Wild Card	The Catch II
47	2009	Arizona Cardinals vs. Green Bay Packers	NFC Wild Card	Highest Scoring Postseason Game
48	1978	New York Giants vs. Philadelphia Eagles	Week 12	Miracle at the Meadowlands
49	1972	New York Jets vs. Baltimore Colts	Week 2	Namath Unitas Shootout
50	1988	Chicago Bears vs. Philadelphia Eagles	NFC Divisional Round	The Fog Bowl
51	1933	Chicago Bears vs. New York Giants	NFL Championship Game	The NFL's First Scheduled Championship Game
52	2003	Green Bay Packers vs. Oakland Raiders	Week 16	Favre's legendary MNF game after his dad passed away
53	1966	Green Bay Packers vs. Kansas City Chiefs	Super Bowl I	The First AFL-NFL Championship Game
54	2007	Green Bay Packers vs. New York Giants	NFC Championship Game	The Chilling Championship
55	1994	Kansas City Chiefs vs. San Francisco 49ers	Week 7	Montana outduels Elway
56	1978	Oakland Raiders vs. San Diego Chargers	Week 2	The Holy Roller
57	2018	Los Angeles Rams vs. New Orleans Saints	NFC Championship Game	No Call
58	1989	San Francisco 49ers vs. Philadelphia Eagles	Week 3	Montana's Finest Hour
59	2006	New Orleans Saints vs. Atlanta Falcons	Week 3	Rebirth
60	1992	San Francisco 49ers vs. Dallas Cowboys	NFC Championship Game	Changing of the Guard
61	2013	Indianapolis Colts vs. Kansas City Chiefs	AFC Wild Card	The Lucky Comeback
62	1934	New York Giants vs. Chicago Bears	NFL Championship Game	The Sneakers Game
63	1983	San Francisco 49ers vs. Washington Redskins	NFC Championship Game	The Forgotten Classic
64	2011	San Francisco 49ers vs. New Orleans Saints	NFC Divisional Round	The Catch III
65	2003	Indianapolis Colts vs. Tampa Bay Buccaneers	Week 5	Late 4th quarter comeback
66	1991	Houston Oilers vs. Denver Broncos	AFC Divisional Round	Elway comeback
67	1981	Cincinnati Bengals vs. San Diego Chargers	AFC Championship Game	The Freezer Bowl
68	2013	Seattle Seahawks vs. San Francisco 49ers	NFC Championship Game	The Tip/Immaculate Deflection
69	2003	Philadelphia Eagles vs. Green Bay Packers	NFC Wild Card	4th and 26
70	1993	Dallas Cowboys vs. New York Giants	Week 18	Emmitt Beats the Giants with One Arm
71	1980	Cleveland Browns vs. Oakland Raiders	AFC Divisional Round	Red Right 88
72	2003	Green Bay Packers vs. Seattle Seahawks	NFC Wild Card	We're Gonna Score
73	1982	Washington Redskins vs. Miami Dolphins	Super Bowl XVII	John Riggins Run for The Ages
74	1980	Dallas Cowboys vs. Atlanta Falcons	NFC Divisional Round	Duel in Dixie
75	1983	Washington Redskins vs. Green Bay Packers	Week 7	Most points scored in MNF history
76	1957	Detroit Lions vs. San Francisco 49ers	Western Conference Championship	Lions 20 point come back
77	1945	Cleveland Rams vs. Washington Redskins	NFL Championship Game	Baugh Hits the Post
78	1996	Jacksonville Jaguars vs. Denver Broncos	AFC Divisional Round	Ambush at Mile High
79	1985	Miami Dolphins vs. Cleveland Browns	AFC Divisional Round	Marino 18-pt comeback
80	1986	Cleveland Browns vs. New York Jets	AFC Divisional Round	Marathon by the Lake
81	1925	Chicago Bears vs. Chicago Cardinals	Week 11	Red Grange's NFL Debut
82	1932	Chicago Bears vs. Portsmouth Spartans	NFL Playoff Game	The NFL's First Playoff Game
83	1994	Miami Dolphins vs. New York Jets	Week 13	Marino's Fake Spike
84	2006	Dallas Cowboys vs. Seattle Seahawks	NFC Wild Card	Romo drops the hold
85	1987	Washington Redskins vs. Denver Broncos	Super Bowl XXII	
86	2003	St. Louis Rams vs. Carolina Panthers	NFC Divisional Round	Panthers Win in Double OT
87	1995	Pittsburgh Steelers vs. Indianapolis Colts	AFC Championship Game	60 Minutes/The Immaculate Deflection
88	2010	Philadelphia Eagles vs. New York Giants	Week 15	Miracle at the Meadowlands II
89	2005	Indianapolis Colts vs. Pittsburgh Steelers	AFC Divisional Round	The Immaculate Redemption
90	1994	Dallas Cowboys vs. San Francisco 49ers	NFC Championship Game	
91	1986	New York Jets vs. Miami Dolphins	Week 3	Marino vs O'Brien duel
92	1979	Pittsburgh Steelers vs. Los Angeles Rams	Super Bowl XIV	
93	1948	Philadelphia Eagles vs. Chicago Cardinals	NFL Championship Game	The Philly Blizzard
94	1982	New England Patriots vs. Miami Dolphins	Week 16	The Snowplow Game
95	2006	Chicago Bears vs. Arizona Cardinals	Week 6	The Bears are Who We Thought They Were!
96	1980	Minnesota Vikings vs. Cleveland Browns	Week 15	Miracle at the Met
97	2009	New Orleans Saints vs. Indianapolis Colts	Super Bowl XLIV	
98	2008	Pittsburgh Steelers vs. Baltimore Ravens	AFC Championship Game	
99	1999	St. Louis Rams vs. Tampa Bay Buccaneers	NFC Championship Game	
100	1982	New York Jets vs. Miami Dolphins	AFC Championship Game	The Mud Bowl
