= David Martin (tight end) =

American football player and coach (born 1979)

No. 83, 87, 88, 80
- Position: Tight end

Personal information
- Born: March 13, 1979 (age 47); Fort Campbell, Kentucky, U.S.
- Listed height: 6 ft 4 in (1.93 m)
- Listed weight: 264 lb (120 kg)

Career information
- High school: Norview (VA)
- College: Tennessee (1997-2000)
- NFL draft: 2001: 6th round, 198th overall pick

Career history
- Green Bay Packers (2001–2006); Miami Dolphins (2007–2009); Buffalo Bills (2010–2011)

Awards and highlights
- BCS national champion (1998)

Career NFL statistics
- Receptions: 159
- Receiving yards: 1,562
- Receiving touchdowns: 15
- Stats at Pro Football Reference

David Earl Martin (born March 13, 1979) is an American former professional football tight end who is currently the tight ends coach at Maryville College. He was selected by the Green Bay Packers in the sixth round of the 2001 NFL draft. He also played for the Miami Dolphins and Buffalo Bills. He played college football at Tennessee.

== Early life ==
Martin did not play football until his final two years at Norview High School in Norfolk, Virginia, yet was rated as the ninth-best prospect in Virginia by SuperPrep at the end of his senior season. He received all-district and All-Tidewater Area honors, in addition to being named as the conference offensive player of the year as a senior, when he caught 35 passes for 690 yards and 11 touchdowns. Aside from being a wide receiver, he was a free safety on defense.

Martin was also a four-time letterman for the school's basketball team, averaging double figures in points his final two seasons.

== College career ==
Martin played college football at Tennessee as a wide receiver. During his career he caught 46 passes for 543 yards and five touchdowns in 39 games.

== Professional career ==
=== Green Bay Packers ===
Martin was selected by the Green Bay Packers in the sixth round of the 2001 NFL draft with the 198th overall pick with the intentions of converting him to a tight end. He spent most of his Packers career backing up Bubba Franks. Altogether he played six years for the Packers making 87 receptions for 766 yards and nine touchdowns.

=== Miami Dolphins ===
On March 5, 2007, Martin signed a three-year deal with the Miami Dolphins. The team signed him to replace Randy McMichael who was released. During his first year with the Dolphins he started all 15 games he played in making 34 receptions and two touchdowns.

Serving as the Dolphins' second tight end behind Anthony Fasano in 2008, Martin caught 31 passes for 450 yards and three touchdowns.

Martin was placed on season-ending injured reserve on September 6, 2009, after tight end Davon Drew was claimed off waivers.

Martin was waived on December 8, 2009, from the Dolphins, and was re-signed by the Dolphins on August 6, 2010. He was cut on September 4, 2010.

=== Buffalo Bills ===
Martin was signed by the Buffalo Bills on September 5, 2010, replacing J. P. Foschi as the second tight end on the Bills roster. He was released on September 27, 2011.

== NFL career statistics ==
Legend
**Bold**	Career high

=== Regular season ===
Year	Team	Games		Receiving					
Year	Team	GP	GS	Tgt	Rec	Yds	Avg	Lng	TD
2001	GNB	14	1	20	13	144	11.1	31	1
2002	GNB	8	2	11	8	33	4.1	7	1
2003	GNB	**16**	3	17	13	79	6.1	14	2
2004	GNB	9	3	12	5	88	**17.6**	35	0
2005	GNB	12	8	39	27	224	8.3	21	**3**
2006	GNB	11	4	36	21	198	9.4	23	2
2007	MIA	15	**15**	**51**	**34**	303	8.9	28	2
2008	MIA	**16**	7	45	31	**450**	14.5	**61**	**3**
2010	BUF	**16**	9	8	7	43	6.1	15	1
2011	BUF	3	0	0	0	0	0.0	0	0
		120	52	239	159	1,562	9.8	61	15

=== Playoffs ===
Year	Team	Games		Receiving					
Year	Team	GP	GS	Tgt	Rec	Yds	Avg	Lng	TD
2002	GNB	1	0	1	0	0	0.0	0	0
2003	GNB	**2**	**1**	2	1	2	2.0	2	0
2008	MIA	1	0	**5**	**3**	**16**	**5.3**	**15**	0
		4	1	8	4	18	4.5	15	0
