= Robert Ferguson (American football) =

American football player (born 1979)

- Ferguson with the Minnesota Vikings in 2008

No. 89
- Position: Wide receiver

Personal information
- Born: December 17, 1979 (age 46); Houston, Texas, U.S.
- Listed height: 6 ft 1 in (1.85 m)
- Listed weight: 219 lb (99 kg)

Career information
- College: Texas A&M
- NFL draft: 2001: 2nd round, 41st overall pick

Career history
- Green Bay Packers (2001–2006); Minnesota Vikings (2007–2008); Atlanta Falcons (2009)*; Omaha Nighthawks (2010)
- * Offseason or practice squad member only

Awards and highlights
- First-team All-Big 12 (2000); Big 12 Offensive Newcomer of the Year (2000)

Career NFL statistics
- Receptions: 151
- Receiving yards: 1,993
- Receiving touchdowns: 13
- Stats at Pro Football Reference

Robert Charles Ferguson (born December 17, 1979) is an American former professional football player who was a wide receiver who played in the National Football League (NFL). He was selected by the Green Bay Packers in the second round of the 2001 NFL draft. He played college football for the Texas A&M Aggies.

Ferguson was also a member of the Minnesota Vikings, Atlanta Falcons and Omaha Nighthawks.

== Early life ==
Ferguson played free safety and wide receiver at Spring Woods High School in Houston, where he was a four-time letter winner. He was named Defensive Player of the Year by the Houston Touchdown Club as a 1997 senior, when he made 96 tackles and 6 interceptions. On offense, he caught 32 passes for 999 yards and 5 touchdowns during his senior year. He won all-district and All-Greater Houston honors on both sides of the ball and was named offensive MVP of the Houston Coaches' Classic All-star game the summer after his senior year. He also earned four letters for the school's basketball team, earning all-district and all-city honors and ran track, where he was the district champion in the long jump.

== College career ==
Originally signed as a safety with Texas A&M, grade troubles forced him to begin his career at Tyler Junior College. Was a junior college All-American in both 1998 and 1999 for TJC. He played safety and receiver but also spent time at cornerback and linebacker. He led the team with 36 receptions for 539 yards during his final year at Tyler.

He established himself as one of the best receivers in the Big 12 Conference while earning first-team conference honors and being named conference Newcomer of the Year during his lone season (2000) at Texas A&M. He was the conference leader in receptions per game and ranked No. 2 in receiving yards.

He was also named the Aggies' offensive MVP when he led the team in catches with 58, receiving yards with 885, receiving touchdowns with 6, and all-purpose yards with 885. His 58 catches ranked No. 5 in school history for a single season, his 885 receiving yards ranked No. 2 and his receiving TD total tied for No. 5. He had three 100-yard receiving games, including 174 against Wyoming which tied for No. 5 in school history. He also had a career-best 11 catches against Oklahoma State.

== Professional career ==
Pre-draft measurables
Height	Weight	40-yard dash	10-yard split	20-yard split	20-yard shuttle	Three-cone drill	Vertical jump	Broad jump
6 ft 1 1/4 in (1.86 m)	205 lb (93 kg)	4.48 s	1.54 s	2.61 s	4.07 s	7.24 s	36.5 in (0.93 m)	10 ft 0 in (3.05 m)
All values from NFL Combine

=== Green Bay Packers ===
Ferguson was selected in the second round of the 2001 NFL draft. He played sparingly in his first year but slowly progressed. 2003 was his best year statistically as he caught 38 passes for 520 yards and 4 touchdowns.

On December 19, 2004, Ferguson sustained a sprained neck and briefly lost feeling in his legs after a clothesline tackle by Jacksonville Jaguars safety Donovin Darius, who was ejected and fined $75,000 for the hit.

On December 19, 2005, he caught Aaron Rodgers' first passing yards, since Rodgers' first completion earlier in the season was for zero (0) yards.

=== Minnesota Vikings ===
He was released by the Packers in 2007 and picked up by the Minnesota Vikings. He was released after the 2008 season.

=== Atlanta Falcons ===
Ferguson signed with the Atlanta Falcons on August 6, 2009, after wide receiver Harry Douglas suffered a season-ending knee injury. He was released at the end of preseason.

=== Omaha Nighthawks ===
Ferguson was signed by the Omaha Nighthawks of the United Football League on August 21, 2010.

== NFL career statistics ==
Legend
**Bold**	Career high

=== Regular season ===
Year	Team	Games		Receiving					
Year	Team	GP	GS	Tgt	Rec	Yds	Avg	Lng	TD
2001	GB	1	0	0	0	0	0.0	0	0
2002	GB	**16**	1	52	22	293	13.3	40	3
2003	GB	15	**12**	60	**38**	**520**	13.7	47	**4**
2004	GB	13	5	49	24	367	**15.3**	48	1
2005	GB	11	7	57	27	366	13.6	51	3
2006	GB	4	1	13	5	31	6.2	10	1
2007	MIN	15	8	**61**	32	391	12.2	**71**	1
2008	MIN	8	0	5	3	25	8.3	9	0
		83	34	297	151	1,993	13.2	71	13

=== Playoffs ===
Year	Team	Games		Receiving					
Year	Team	GP	GS	Tgt	Rec	Yds	Avg	Lng	TD
2002	GB	1	**1**	**9**	3	17	5.7	10	0
2003	GB	**2**	**1**	7	**5**	**73**	**14.6**	**40**	**2**
		3	2	16	8	90	11.3	40	2

== Personal life ==
=== Legal Trouble ===
Ferguson and his wife, Tiffany Ferguson, were accused of assaulting Demond Demas and Demas' relative, shortly after Demas was accused of assaulting his girlfriend.
