= Najeh Davenport =

American football player (born 1979)

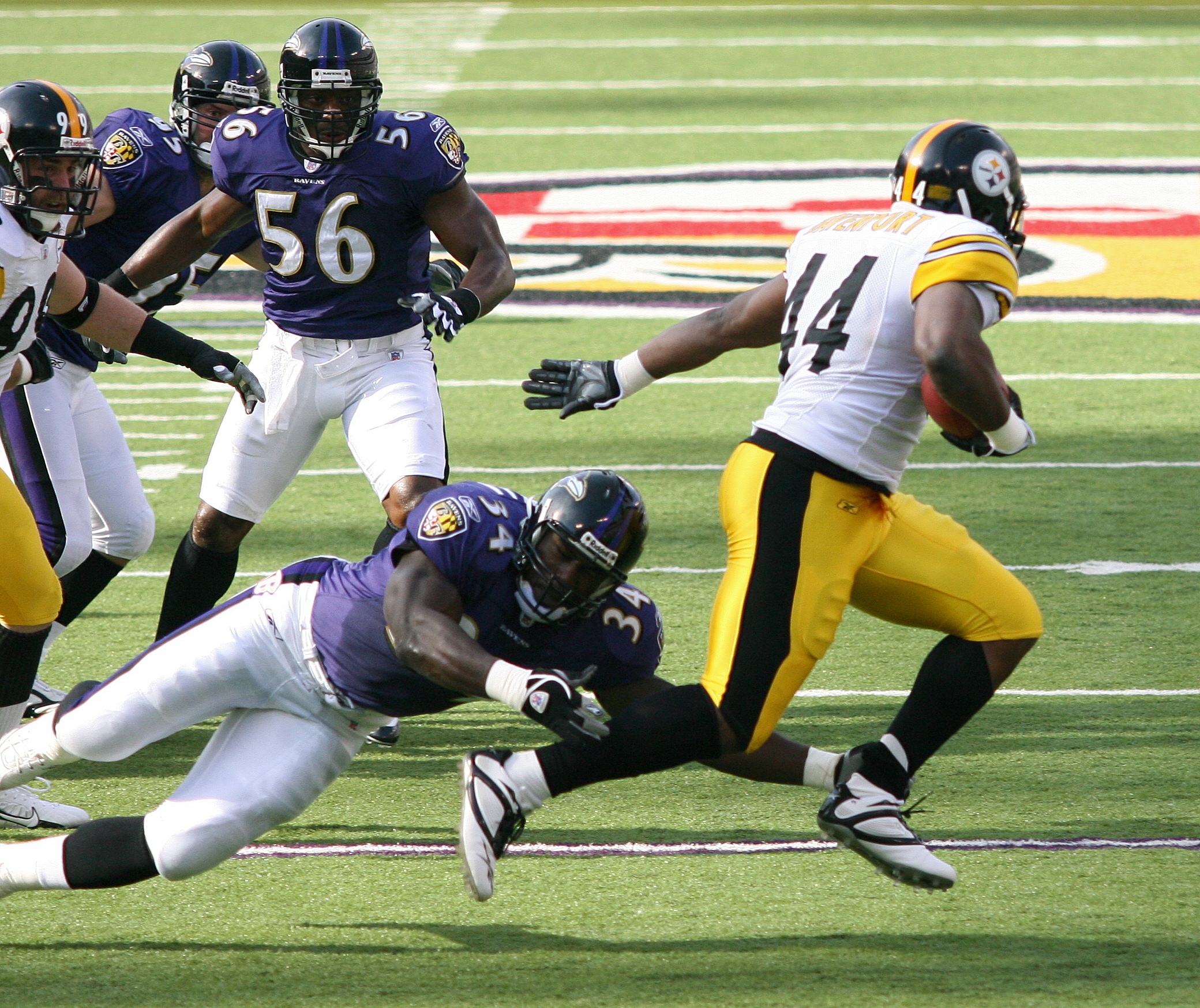
- Davenport with the Pittsburgh Steelers in 2006

No. 44, 49
- Position: Running back

Personal information
- Born: February 8, 1979 (age 47); Raleigh, North Carolina, U.S.
- Listed height: 6 ft 1 in (1.85 m)
- Listed weight: 247 lb (112 kg)

Career information
- High school: Miami Central (West Little River, Florida)
- College: Miami (FL) (1998–2001)
- NFL draft: 2002: 4th round, 135th overall pick

Career history
- Green Bay Packers (2002–2005); Pittsburgh Steelers (2006–2008); Indianapolis Colts (2008)

Awards and highlights
- BCS national champion (2001)

Career NFL statistics
- Rushing attempts: 394
- Rushing yards: 1,819
- Rushing touchdowns: 13
- Receptions: 54
- Receiving yards: 538
- Receiving touchdowns: 3
- Stats at Pro Football Reference

Najeh Trenadious Monté Davenport (born February 8, 1979) is an American former professional football player who was a running back in the National Football League. He played college football for the Miami Hurricanes and was selected by the Green Bay Packers in the fourth round of the 2002 NFL draft. In addition to the Packers, Davenport played in the NFL for the Pittsburgh Steelers and Indianapolis Colts.

== College career ==
Davenport attended the University of Miami, where he played primarily as a halfback. Chosen as the offensive captain, he won an NCAA Division I-A national football championship as a member of the Hurricanes in 2001. He earned a Bachelor of Arts degree in theatre with a minor in education at the University of Miami. He was chosen by the Packers in the fourth round of the 2002 NFL draft with the 135th overall pick.

== Professional career ==
=== Green Bay Packers ===
During his NFL career, Davenport struggled with fumbles and with injuries that kept him off the playing field. Davenport's abilities exceed a fourth-round selection, but as many scouts predicted, Davenport was plagued by injuries throughout his career. In his rookie campaign, he rushed for a respectable 4.7 yards per carry average before fracturing his left eye socket.

In 2003, injuries were minimal and he rushed for 5.45 yards per carry, good for the second highest in the NFL, and 30.1 yards per kick return. However, in the 2004 season, Davenport started the season with a lingering hamstring injury that kept him out for a month. On November 29, 2004, Davenport, in his first NFL start, rushed for 178 yards, third highest debut start yardage in the NFL for the past 20 years. Later that year, Davenport broke his ribs, resulting in playing at far less than 100 percent.

In 2005, after starting running back Ahman Green went down with a quadriceps injury, Davenport took over as starter. In what would be his only start of the season, versus the New Orleans Saints, Davenport scored two first-half touchdowns before breaking his ankle. He was subsequently placed on injured reserve, effectively ending his season.

=== Pittsburgh Steelers ===
Davenport was released by the Packers on September 2, 2006, when the team made their final roster cuts. Six days later, on September 8, 2006, however, Davenport was signed to the roster of the Pittsburgh Steelers. He finished the 2006 season with a total of 221 rushing yards.

After the Steelers signed veteran running back Kevan Barlow, Davenport was facing competition with Barlow for the second and third string positions. However, Barlow was cut during training camp, and Davenport assumed the second-string responsibilities for Pittsburgh's opener against Cleveland. Davenport rushed for 43 yards on eight carries in the Steelers' 34–7 win.

Arguably his best game with the Steelers came on Thursday, December 20, 2007, against the St. Louis Rams. Davenport had 24 carries for 123 yards and a touchdown, as well as two catches for 44 yards and another touchdown. Davenport came into the game to relieve Willie Parker, who broke his fibula in the first quarter.

The Steelers released Davenport on June 28, 2008. He was re-signed on September 30 following injuries to Willie Parker, Rashard Mendenhall and Carey Davis. The Steelers released him again on November 8, only to re-sign him on November 27 due to the injury to Parker. Davenport was released once more on December 2.

=== Indianapolis Colts ===
Davenport was signed by the Indianapolis Colts on December 9, 2008. In two games with the Colts, he had eight rushes for 26 yards and caught four passes for 54 yards. He was released on January 3, 2009, after the team elevated offensive tackle Michael Toudouze from the practice squad.

=== NFL statistics ===
Rushing Statistics

Year	Team	Games	Carries	Yards	Yards per carry	Longest carry	Touchdowns	First downs	Fumbles	Fumbles lost
2002	GB	8	39	184	4.7	43	1	8	1	1
2003	GB	15	77	420	5.5	76	2	18	4	1
2004	GB	11	71	359	5.1	40	2	16	0	0
2005	GB	5	30	105	3.5	24	2	9	1	0
2006	PIT	13	60	221	3.7	48	1	9	1	0
2007	PIT	15	107	499	4.7	45	5	37	1	0
2008	PIT	4	2	5	2.5	3	0	2	0	0
2008	IND	2	8	26	3.3	8	0	1	0	0
Career		73	394	1,819	4.6	76	13	100	8	2

Receiving Statistics

Year	Team	Games	Receptions	Targets	Yards	Yards per Reception	Longest Reception	Touchdowns	First Downs	Fumbles	Fumbles Lost
2002	GB	8	5	-	33	6.6	13	0	2	0	0
2003	GB	15	6	-	38	6.3	12	0	2	0	0
2004	GB	11	4	-	33	8.3	12	0	1	0	0
2005	GB	5	2	-	3	1.5	2	0	0	0	0
2006	PIT	13	15	21	193	12.9	32	1	9	0	0
2007	PIT	15	18	27	184	10.2	32	2	6	0	0
2008	IND	2	4	4	54	13.5	33	0	2	0	0
Career		73	54	52	538	10.0	33	3	22	0	0

Returning Statistics

Year	Team	Games	Kickoff Return Attempts	Kickoff Return Yards	Kickoffs Returned for Touchdown	Longest Kickoff Return
2002	GB	8	6	130	0	27
2003	GB	15	16	505	0	60
2004	GB	11	14	286	0	27
2005	GB	5	10	189	0	27
2006	PIT	13	21	448	0	40
2007	PIT	15	7	123	0	29
2008	PIT	4	10	217	0	27
2008	IND	2	5	107	0	26
Career		73	89	2,005	0	60

== Personal life ==
=== Burglary and criminal mischief charge ===
Prior to entering the NFL, Davenport broke into the dorm room of a Barry University woman and defecated in a laundry basket on April 1, 2002. A woman sleeping in the room told police she was startled by a strange grunting sound and observed Davenport in a squatted position, evacuating his bowels and voiding into a laundry hamper in her closet. In a plea bargain, his felony charge of second-degree burglary and misdemeanor count of criminal mischief were dropped in exchange for his completing 100 hours of community service. Davenport maintained his innocence after the hearing, demanding outside of the courthouse, "Where's the evidence? Where's the manure? I know I didn't do it – I just wanted to get it over with."

During his career, Davenport was given the nicknames "Dookie" and "The Dump Truck." While playing for the Packers, a portable commode was placed inside of his locker during training camp as a rookie hazing prank, and a spirited letter writing campaign to the Green Bay team equipment manager asked in jest that he be issued jersey Number Two for practice, which was referenced for many years during the opening of the "D-List" show on WAUK ESPN 540 in Milwaukee before the station flipped format from sports talk to progressive talk. All are plays on the incident.

=== Alleged domestic violence ===
Davenport was charged in Cleveland with domestic violence, endangering, and unlawful restraint in an October 2007 incident involving the mother of his five-year-old son. He entered a plea of not guilty days later and the case went to trial on April 4, 2008. After a four-day trial, an eight-member jury spent three and a half hours deliberating before finding Davenport not guilty of all counts.

=== Race-based Discrimination in NFL Concussion Settlement ===
On October 25, 2020, Davenport and another ex-NFL player, Kevin Henry (cousin of professional wrestling great Mark Henry and coincidentally also an ex-Steeler), filed a lawsuit against the NFL stating the NFL used "race-norming" as a factor to determine neurocognitive impairment as part of the NFL's Concussion Settlement. The complaint stated that Black players' neurocognitive impairment score was adjusted by making an assumption that Black players started with a lower cognitive ability than a non-Black player. This adjustment made it more difficult for Black players to prove cognitive decline compared to non-Black players. On October 21, 2021, the NFL and lawyers for thousands of retired NFL players reached an agreement to end race-based adjustments in cognitive testing related to the NFL's Concussion Settlement.
