= Nick Luchey =

American football player (born 1977)

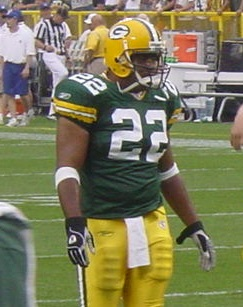
- Luchey in 2003

No. 30, 22, 39
- Position: Fullback

Personal information
- Born: March 30, 1977 (age 49); Royal Oak, Michigan, U.S.
- Listed height: 6 ft 2 in (1.88 m)
- Listed weight: 270 lb (122 kg)

Career information
- High school: Harrison (Farmington Hills, Michigan)
- College: Miami (FL)
- NFL draft: 1999: 5th round, 135th overall pick

Career history
- Cincinnati Bengals (1999–2002); Green Bay Packers (2003–2004); Cincinnati Bengals (2005); Houston Texans (2006)*; Baltimore Ravens (2006)
- * Offseason or practice squad member only

Career NFL statistics
- Games played: 75
- Rushing attempts: 44
- Rushing yards: 170
- Rushing touchdowns: 2
- Receptions: 27
- Receiving yards: 258
- Stats at Pro Football Reference

James Nicolas Luchey (born James Nicolas Williams March 30, 1977) is an American former professional football player who was a fullback in the National Football League (NFL). Luchey played college football for the Miami Hurricanes before being selected by the Cincinnati Bengals in the fifth round of the 1999 NFL draft. He played high school football at Harrison High School in Farmington Hills, Michigan, where he won two state football championships (1993 and 1994) before graduating in 1995. He entered the NFL using the name Nick Williams but changed his surname to Luchey in August 2002 to honor his father and grandfather.

== Career ==
- Cincinnati Bengals (1999–2002, 2005)
- Green Bay Packers (2003–2004)
- Baltimore Ravens (2006)
