= William Henderson (American football) =

American football player (born 1971)

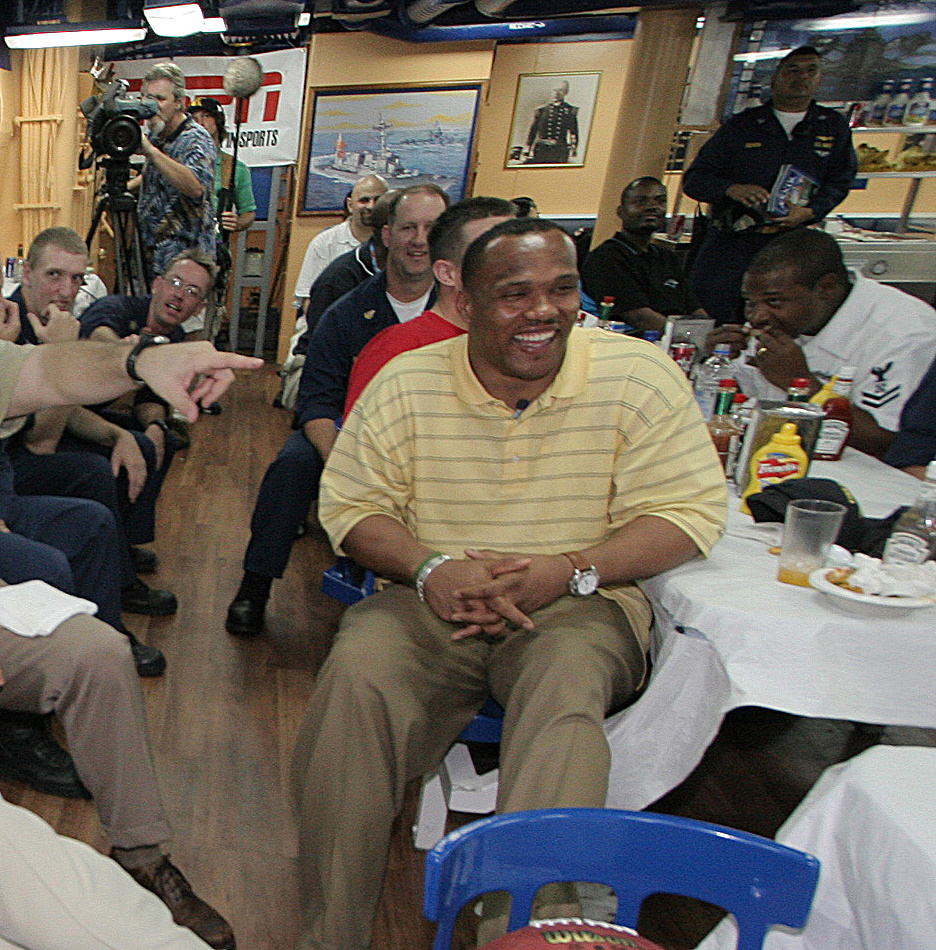
- Henderson and sailors watch Super Bowl XXXIX in the galley of USS Russell.

No. 30, 33
- Position: Fullback

Personal information
- Born: February 19, 1971 (age 55); Richmond, Virginia, U.S.
- Listed height: 6 ft 1 in (1.85 m)
- Listed weight: 252 lb (114 kg)

Career information
- High school: Thomas Dale (Chester, Virginia)
- College: North Carolina
- NFL draft: 1995: 3rd round, 66th overall pick

Career history
- Green Bay Packers (1995–2006)

Awards and highlights
- Super Bowl champion (XXXI); First-team All-Pro (2004); Pro Bowl (2004); Green Bay Packers Hall of Fame

Career NFL statistics
- Rushing yards: 426
- Rushing average: 3.5
- Rushing touchdowns: 5
- Receptions: 320
- Receiving yards: 2,409
- Receiving touchdowns: 14
- Stats at Pro Football Reference

William Terrelle Henderson (born February 19, 1971) is an American former professional football player who was a fullback for 12 seasons with the Green Bay Packers of the National Football League (NFL), with whom he won Super Bowl XXXI against the New England Patriots. He played college football for the North Carolina Tar Heels, and was chosen by the Packers in the third round of the 1995 NFL draft.

== Early life and college ==
Henderson attended Thomas Dale High School in Chester, Virginia. He played varsity football as a freshman, sophomore, and junior, but sat out his senior year due to a knee injury.

At the University of North Carolina at Chapel Hill, Henderson finished his career with 145 carries for 750 yards (5.17 yards per carry avg.) and 14 receptions for 97 yards (6.93 yards per rec. avg.).

== Professional career ==
Henderson was drafted 66th overall in the third round by the Green Bay Packers in 1995, and played every season in his career with the Packers. He came into the league as number 30, but after cornerback Doug Evans left, changed his number to 33.

Henderson was durable and effective for the Packers, solidifying the team at fullback after moving into the starting role in 1996. Nine times in his first 11 seasons he played in all 16 games. He was selected to 2004 Pro Bowl. His consistent play, especially in his later years, had many Packer players and fans calling him "Old Reliable."

Henderson played in 188 games for the Green Bay Packers putting him in 7th place for "Most Games Played" in the team's history. Only Mason Crosby (258), Brett Favre (255), Aaron Rodgers (230), Donald Driver (205), Bart Starr (196) and Ray Nitschke (190) played in more games for the Packers. He also blocked for six of the top nine individual rushing efforts in team annals — Dorsey Levens' 1,435 yards in 1997 (third), Ahman Green's 1,883 in 2003 (first), 1,387 in 2001 (fourth), 1,240 in 2002 (sixth), 1,175 in 2000 (seventh) and 1,163 in 2004 (ninth). Henderson would be the lead blocker for a 1,000-yard running back for 9 of his 12 NFL seasons, for three different running backs: Edgar Bennett, Dorsey Levens, and Ahman Green.

Henderson was also valuable as pass catcher out of the backfield. As of 2008, he stands tenth all-time on the Packers' career receptions list with 320 (for 2,409 yards), and first among running backs. He also has 123 career rushing attempts for 426 yards.

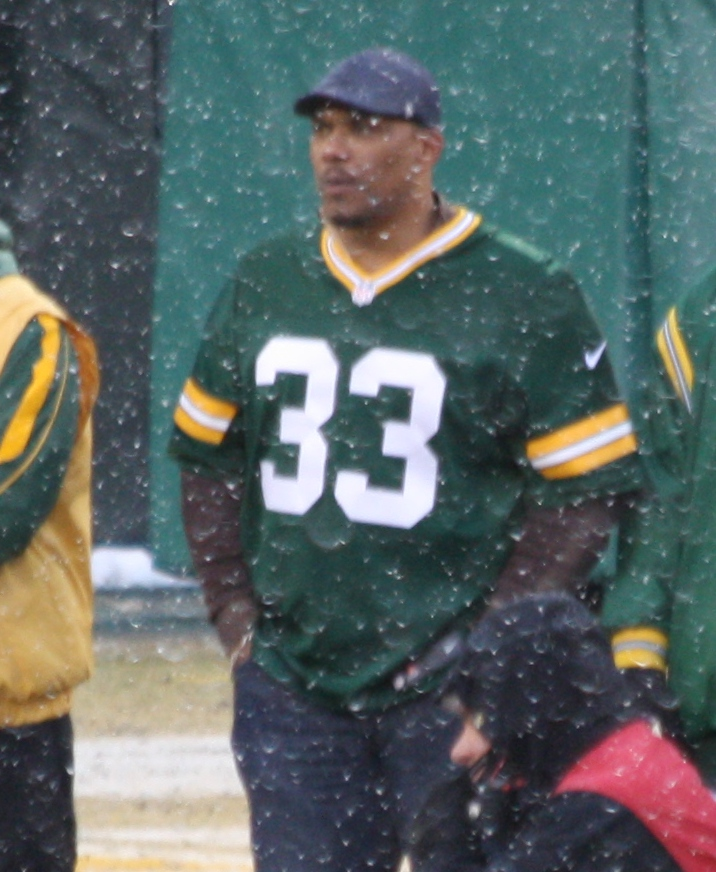
Henderson in 2013 at Green Bay after his retirement

On March 7, 2007, the Packers released Henderson amidst rumors that the Packers were trying to sign fullback Justin Griffith. GM Ted Thompson released the following statement. "We are releasing William at this point so he can pursue other opportunities within the National Football League," GM Ted Thompson said. "The Packers organization is extremely appreciative of his efforts over the past 12 seasons. His leadership and work ethic set an excellent example for everyone in our locker room. It is difficult to part with a high-character individual like William. He has been an influential person on several outstanding Packers teams over his career. He always will be considered a Packer." He was inducted into the Green Bay Packers Hall of Fame in 2011.

=== NFL statistics ===
Rushing stats

| Year | Team | Games | Carries | Yards | Yards per carry | Longest carry | Touchdowns | First downs | Fumbles | Fumbles lost |
|---|---|---|---|---|---|---|---|---|---|---|
| 1995 | GB | 15 | 7 | 35 | 5.0 | 17 | 0 | 1 | 0 | 0 |
| 1996 | GB | 16 | 39 | 130 | 3.3 | 14 | 0 | 12 | 0 | 0 |
| 1997 | GB | 16 | 31 | 113 | 3.6 | 15 | 0 | 11 | 0 | 0 |
| 1998 | GB | 16 | 23 | 70 | 3.0 | 9 | 2 | 10 | 0 | 0 |
| 1999 | GB | 16 | 7 | 29 | 4.1 | 10 | 2 | 2 | 0 | 0 |
| 2000 | GB | 16 | 2 | 16 | 8.0 | 12 | 0 | 0 | 0 | 0 |
| 2001 | GB | 16 | 6 | 11 | 1.8 | 4 | 0 | 2 | 0 | 0 |
| 2002 | GB | 15 | 7 | 27 | 3.9 | 10 | 1 | 2 | 0 | 0 |
| 2005 | GB | 16 | 1 | -5 | -5.0 | -5 | 0 | 0 | 1 | 1 |
| Career | | 188 | 123 | 426 | 3.5 | 17 | 5 | 40 | 1 | 1 |

Receiving stats

| Year | Team | Games | Receptions | Yards | Yards per Reception | Longest Reception | Touchdowns | First Downs | Fumbles | Fumbles Lost |
|---|---|---|---|---|---|---|---|---|---|---|
| 1995 | GB | 15 | 3 | 21 | 7.0 | 9 | 0 | 0 | 0 | 0 |
| 1996 | GB | 16 | 27 | 203 | 7.5 | 27 | 1 | 13 | 1 | 0 |
| 1997 | GB | 16 | 41 | 367 | 9.0 | 25 | 1 | 17 | 1 | 1 |
| 1998 | GB | 16 | 37 | 241 | 6.5 | 15 | 1 | 13 | 1 | 1 |
| 1999 | GB | 16 | 30 | 203 | 6.8 | 22 | 1 | 11 | 1 | 1 |
| 2000 | GB | 16 | 35 | 234 | 6.7 | 25 | 1 | 9 | 1 | 1 |
| 2001 | GB | 16 | 21 | 193 | 9.2 | 26 | 0 | 8 | 0 | 0 |
| 2002 | GB | 15 | 26 | 168 | 6.5 | 17 | 3 | 12 | 0 | 0 |
| 2003 | GB | 16 | 24 | 214 | 8.9 | 22 | 3 | 14 | 0 | 0 |
| 2004 | GB | 16 | 34 | 239 | 7.0 | 38 | 3 | 15 | 0 | 0 |
| 2005 | GB | 16 | 30 | 264 | 8.8 | 32 | 0 | 13 | 0 | 0 |
| 2006 | GB | 14 | 12 | 62 | 5.2 | 13 | 0 | 3 | 0 | 0 |
| Career | | 188 | 320 | 2,409 | 7.5 | 38 | 14 | 128 | 5 | 4 |

Returning stats

| Year | Team | Games | Kickoffs Return Attempts | Kickoff Return Yards | Kickoffs Returned for Touchdown | Kickoffs Fair Caught | Longest Kickoff Return |
|---|---|---|---|---|---|---|---|
| 1996 | GB | 16 | 2 | 38 | 0 | 0 | 23 |
| 1999 | GB | 16 | 2 | 23 | 0 | 0 | 16 |
| 2000 | GB | 16 | 5 | 80 | 0 | 0 | 22 |
| 2001 | GB | 16 | 6 | 62 | 0 | 0 | 14 |
| 2003 | GB | 16 | 3 | 33 | 0 | 0 | 15 |
| 2004 | GB | 16 | 0 | 16 | 0 | 0 | 10 |
| 2005 | GB | 16 | 2 | 20 | 0 | 0 | 10 |
| 2006 | GB | 14 | 4 | 41 | 0 | 0 | 16 |
| Career | | 126 | 26 | 313 | 0 | 0 | 23 |

== Broadcasting career ==
Henderson has eight years (1999–2006) of broadcasting experience as co-host of Monday Night Kickoff, a show produced by Green Bay TV station WBAY. He also worked as an analyst as part of ESPN's NFL draft coverage April 2006.

Henderson resides in Richmond, Virginia. He was selected as Green Bay's 2001 'Unsung Hero,' in recognition of his efforts both on the field and in the community.
