= Bubba Franks =

American football player (born 1978)

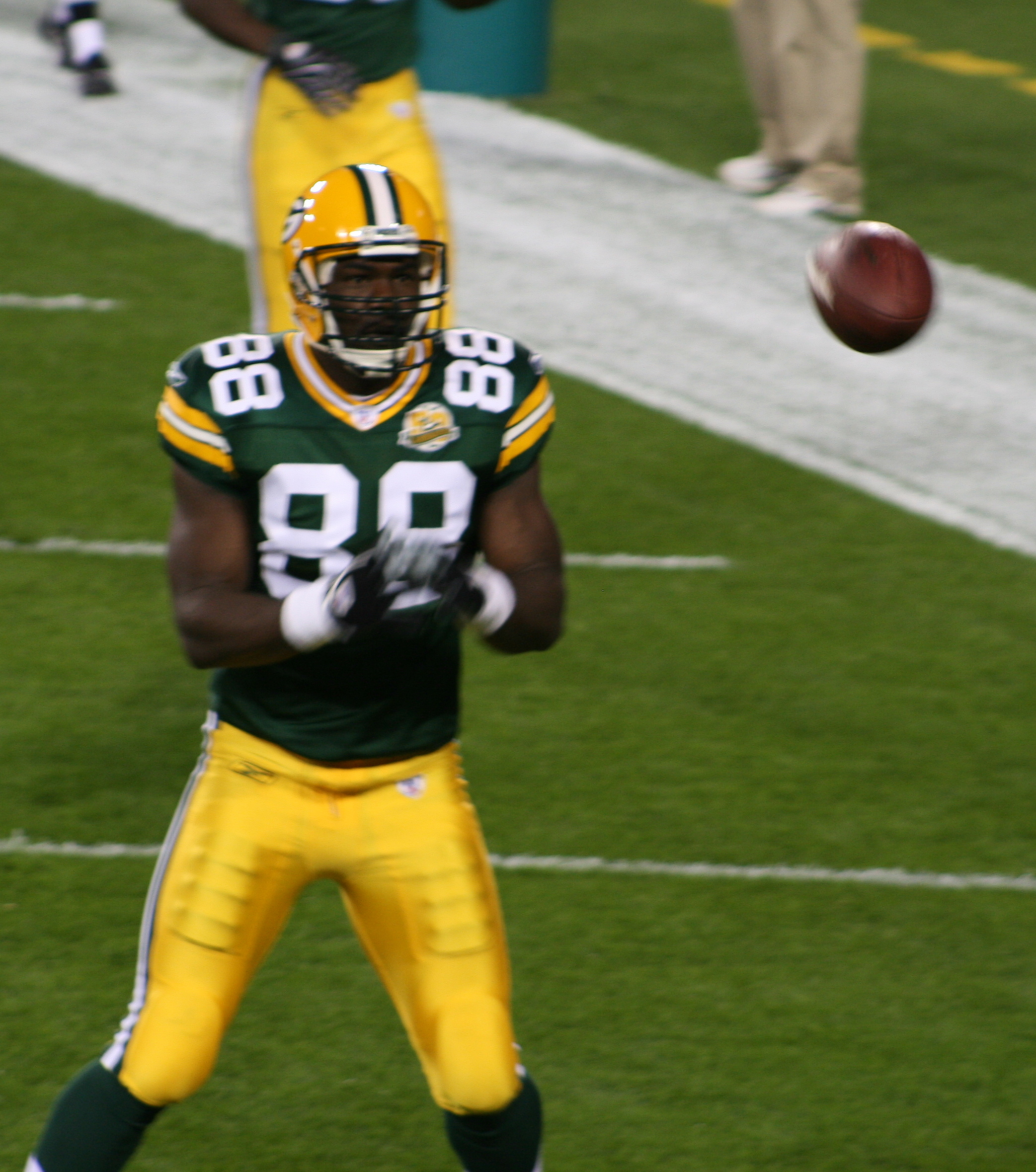
- Franks with the Green Bay Packers in 2007

No. 88
- Position: Tight end

Personal information
- Born: January 6, 1978 (age 48); Riverside, California, U.S.
- Listed height: 6 ft 6 in (1.98 m)
- Listed weight: 265 lb (120 kg)

Career information
- High school: Big Spring (Big Spring, Texas)
- College: Miami (FL) (1996–1999)
- NFL draft: 2000: 1st round, 14th overall pick

Career history
- Green Bay Packers (2000–2007); New York Jets (2008)

Awards and highlights
- 3× Pro Bowl (2001–2003); NFL Alumni Tight End of the Year (2002); First-team All-American (1999); Freshman All-American (1997); 2× First-team All-Big East (1998, 1999); Second-team All-Big East (1997)

Career NFL statistics
- Receptions: 262
- Receiving yards: 2,347
- Receiving touchdowns: 32
- Stats at Pro Football Reference

Daniel Lamont "Bubba" Franks (born January 6, 1978) is an American former professional football player who was a tight end for nine seasons in the National Football League (NFL). He played college football for the Miami Hurricanes, earning first-team All-American honors in 1999. He was selected by the Green Bay Packers in the first round of the 2000 NFL draft with the 14th overall pick.

== Early life ==
Bubba attended Big Spring High School in Big Spring, Texas and was an all state tight end there.

== College career ==
Franks played collegiate football at the University of Miami, where he was known for his extraordinary one-handed receptions. He redshirted in 1996, but was very productive in the 1997, 1998, and 1999 seasons, setting the University of Miami record for most touchdowns by a tight end, with 12. He was also named to the All-Big East team twice and was named as an All-American in 1999.

Franks waived his final year of eligibility to enter the 2000 NFL draft and was selected in the first round, with the 14th overall selection, by the Green Bay Packers.

=== Awards and honors ===
- Second-team All-Big East (1997)
- Sporting News Freshman All-American (1997)
- First-team All-Big East (1998–1999)
- First-team All-American (1999)

== Professional career ==
=== Green Bay Packers ===
After a promising but unspectacular rookie season, he reached the Pro Bowl his second NFL year, during which he caught nine touchdown passes in the 2001 season. Franks went to three Pro Bowls altogether (2001, 2002, and 2003). He missed much of the 2005 season with knee and neck injuries.

On February 20, 2008, Franks was released by the Packers after an unproductive and injury-plagued 2007 season in which he was demoted to second string tight end behind Donald Lee.

=== New York Jets ===
On March 16, 2008, Franks agreed to terms with the New York Jets on a one-year deal. Franks was released on July 13, 2009.

== NFL career statistics ==
Season	Team	GP	Receiving							
Season	Team	GP	Rec	Yds	Avg	Lng	TD	FD	Fum	Lost
2000	GB	16	34	363	10.7	27	1	16	1	0
2001	GB	16	36	322	8.9	31	9	22	0	0
2002	GB	16	54	442	8.2	20	7	28	0	0
2003	GB	16	30	241	8.0	24	4	13	0	0
2004	GB	16	34	361	10.6	29	7	20	0	0
2005	GB	10	25	207	8.3	24	1	12	0	0
2006	GB	16	25	232	9.3	19	0	13	2	1
2007	GB	8	18	132	7.3	24	3	7	0	0
2008	NYJ	8	6	47	7.8	25	0	2	0	0
Career		122	262	2,347	9.0	31	32	133	3	1

== Personal ==
Has a wife, Raquel, son, Daniel II, and daughter, Sienna.
