= Tony Fisher (American football) =

American football player (born 1979)

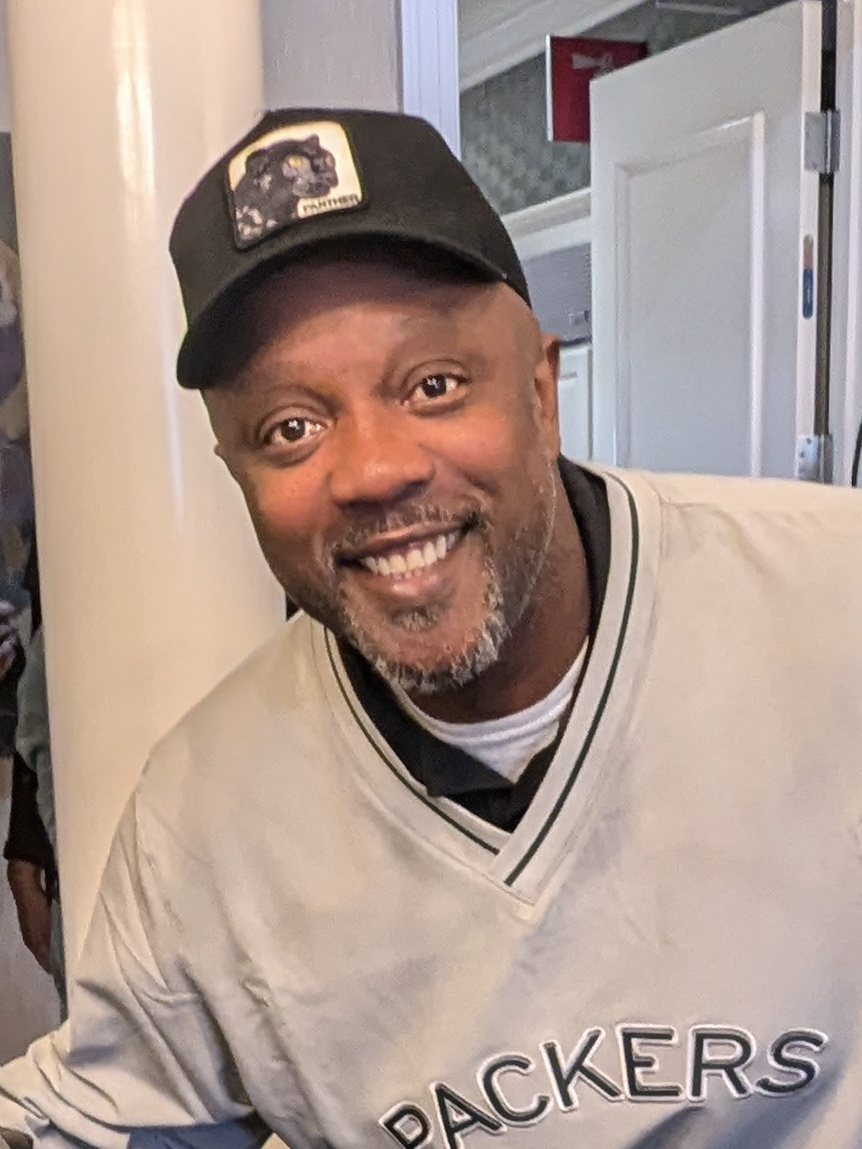
- Fisher in 2025

No. 40, 30
- Position: Running back

Personal information
- Born: October 12, 1979 (age 47); Euclid, Ohio, U.S.
- Listed height: 6 ft 1 in (1.85 m)
- Listed weight: 222 lb (101 kg)

Career information
- High school: Euclid
- College: Notre Dame
- NFL draft: 2002: undrafted

Career history
- Green Bay Packers (2002–2005); St. Louis Rams (2006); New York Jets (2007)*
- * Offseason or practice squad member only

Career NFL statistics
- Rushing yards: 889
- Rushing average: 3.7
- Rushing touchdowns: 4
- Stats at Pro Football Reference

Tony Fisher (born October 12, 1979) is an American former professional football player who was a running back in the National Football League (NFL). After playing college football for the Notre Dame Fighting Irish, he was signed by the Green Bay Packers as a free agent. He also played for the St. Louis Rams. He was signed by the New York Jets on July 27, 2007, but was released just two weeks later.

In 1997, Fisher won the prestigious Mr. Football Award as the player deemed to be the best high school football player in the state of Ohio.

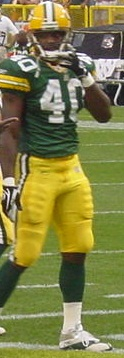
Fisher in 2003
