= 2005 Green Bay Packers season =

NFL team season

- General manager: Ted Thompson
- Head coach: Mike Sherman
- Home stadium: Lambeau Field

Results
- Record: 4–12
- Division place: 4th NFC North
- Playoffs: Did not qualify

Uniform

The 2005 season was the Green Bay Packers' 85th in the National Football League (NFL), their 87th overall and the sixth and final under head coach Mike Sherman. It would be the first and only losing season the franchise would have involving quarterback Brett Favre.

The Packers failed to improve their overall record of 10–6 from 2004 and failed to make the playoffs for the first time since 2000. This would be their first losing season since 1991. As of the 2025 season, this is the only season since divisional realignment the Packers finished in last place in the NFC North.

The Packers suffered injuries to wide receivers Javon Walker and Robert Ferguson and running backs Ahman Green, Najeh Davenport, Tony Fisher, and Samkon Gado. As a result of the lackluster season, most of the team's coaches were fired, including head coach Mike Sherman.

== Offseason ==
The Packers lost veteran guards Marco Rivera (Dallas Cowboys) and Mike Wahle (Carolina Panthers) to free agency. Starting safety Darren Sharper was released by Green Bay Packers, signing with the Minnesota Vikings. With the 24th pick of the 2005 NFL draft the Green Bay Packers selected quarterback Aaron Rodgers, the second quarterback taken in the draft. Rodgers became the Packers' starting quarterback in the 2008 season after Brett Favre's trade to the New York Jets and has since become a four-time NFL MVP and he led the Packers to victory in Super Bowl XLV.

Additions	Subtractions
LB Robert Thomas (Rams)	G Marco Rivera (Cowboys)
G Matt O'Dwyer (Buccaneers)	G Mike Wahle (Panthers)
G Adrian Klemm (Patriots)	FS Darren Sharper (Vikings)
S Earl Little (Browns)	LB Hannibal Navies (Bengals)
S Todd Franz (Redskins)	CB Michael Hawthorne (Rams)
	FS Bhawoh Jue (Chargers)
	QB Doug Pederson (retirement)
	P Bryan Barker (Rams)
	FB Nick Luchey (Bengals)

=== NFL draft ===
2005 Green Bay Packers draft
Round	Pick	Player	Position	College	Notes
1	24	Aaron Rodgers *	Quarterback	California	
2	51	Nick Collins *	Safety	Bethune–Cookman	from New Orleans
2	58	Terrence Murphy	Wide receiver	Texas A&M	
4	115	Marviel Underwood	Safety	San Diego State	from Carolina
4	125	Brady Poppinga	Linebacker	BYU	
5	143	Junius Coston	Center	North Carolina A&T	from Oakland
5	167	Mike Hawkins	Cornerback	Oklahoma	from Philadelphia
6	180	Michael Montgomery	Defensive tackle	Texas A&M	from Oakland
6	195	Craig Bragg	Wide receiver	UCLA	from Baltimore via New England
7	245	Kurt Campbell	Cornerback	Albany (NY)	from Philadelphia
7	246	Will Whitticker	Guard	Michigan State	from New England
Made roster * Made at least one Pro Bowl during career

=== Undrafted free agents ===
2005 undrafted free agents of note
Player	Position	College
Bryce Benekos	Punter	UTEP
Vince Butler	Wide receiver	Northwestern Oklahoma State
Garrett Cross	Tight end	California
Patrick Dendy	Cornerback	Rice
Steve Fleming	Tight end	Arizona
Samkon Gado	Running back	Liberty
A. J. Lindsay	Defensive tackle	Temple
Roy Manning	Linebacker	Michigan
Chris Samp	Wide receiver	Winona State
Leigh Torrence	Cornerback	Stanford
Chris White	Center	Southern Miss
Chaz Williams	Running back	Georgia Southern
Zac Woodfin	Linebacker	UAB

== Personnel ==
=== Staff ===
2005 Green Bay Packers staff
Front office: President and chief executive officer – Bob Harlan; Executive vice president, general manager and director of football operations – Ted Thompson; Executive vice president and chief operating officer – John Jones; Vice president of player finance/general counsel – Andrew Brandt; Director of college scouting – John Dorsey; Director of pro personnel – Reggie McKenzie; Personnel analyst to general manager – John Schneider; Assistant director of college scouting – Shaun Herock; Head coaches: Executive vice president/head coach – Mike Sherman; Offensive coaches: Offensive coordinator – Tom Rossley; Quarterbacks – Darrell Bevell; Running backs – Edgar Bennett; Wide receivers – James Franklin; Tight ends/assistant offensive line – Joe Philbin; Offensive line – Larry Beightol; Assistant offensive line/quality control – James Campen	Defensive coaches: Defensive coordinator – Jim Bates; Defensive tackles – Robert Nunn; Defensive ends – Bob Sanders; Linebackers – Mark Duffner; Secondary/safeties – Joe Baker; Defensive nickel package/cornerbacks – Lionel Washington; Defensive quality control – Charlie Jackson; Special teams coaches: Special teams coordinator – John Bonamego; Assistant special teams – Brad Miller; Strength and conditioning: Strength and conditioning – Barry Rubin; Strength and conditioning assistant – Mark Lovat; Weight room assistant – Vince Workman

=== Roster ===
2005 Green Bay Packers roster
Quarterbacks (QB): 4 Brett Favre; 16 Craig Nall; 12 Aaron Rodgers; Running backs (RB): 40 Tony Fisher; 35 Samkon Gado; 33 William Henderson FB; 23 Noah Herron; 48 Vonta Leach FB; Wide receivers (WR): 83 Antonio Chatman; 80 Donald Driver; 82 Rod Gardner; 19 Jamal Jones; 81 Andrae Thurman; Tight ends (TE): 49 Tory Humphrey; 86 Donald Lee; 87 David Martin; 82 Ben Steele	Offensive linemen (OL): 71 Kevin Barry RT; 76 Chad Clifton LT; 62 Junius Coston C; 58 Mike Flanagan C; 70 Adrian Klemm RG; 67 Grey Ruegamer C; 65 Mark Tauscher RT; 63 Scott Wells LG; 68 Chris White RG; 79 Will Whitticker RG; Defensive linemen (DL): 90 Colin Cole DT; 94 Kabeer Gbaja-Biamila DE; 74 Aaron Kampman DE; 75 Grady Jackson DT; 77 Cullen Jenkins DT; 96 Michael Montgomery DE; 98 Kenny Peterson DT; 95 Donnell Washington DT; 99 Corey Williams DT	Linebackers (LB): 56 Nick Barnett MLB; 59 Na'il Diggs OLB; 57 John Leake OLB; 53 Paris Lenon MLB; 54 Roy Manning OLB; Defensive backs (DB): 47 Atari Bigby SS; 28 Ahmad Carroll CB; 36 Nick Collins FS; 34 Patrick Dendy CB; 39 Therrian Fontenot CB; 43 Todd Franz SS; 31 Al Harris CB; 37 Mike Hawkins CB; 20 Mark Roman SS; 25 Marviel Underwood FS; 41 Jerron Wishom CB; Special teams (ST): 60 Rob Davis LS; 6 Ryan Flinn P; 8 Ryan Longwell K	Practice squad: 19 Vince Butler WR; 45 Ran Carthon RB; 46 Jimmy Dixon FB; 10 Chad Lucas WR; 18 Ruvell Martin WR; 69 Tim McGill DT; Reserve: 52 Kurt Campbell LB (IR); 44 Najeh Davenport RB (IR); 89 Robert Ferguson WR (IR); 88 Bubba Franks TE (IR); 30 Ahman Green RB (IR); 26 Jason Horton CB (IR); 32 ReShard Lee RB (IR); 21 Earl Little S (IR); 85 Terrence Murphy WR (IR); 51 Brady Poppinga LB (IR); 11 B. J. Sander P (IR); 55 Robert Thomas OLB (IR); 38 Jeremy Thornburg S (IR); 84 Javon Walker WR (IR); 42 Chaz Williams RB (IR); 29 Walter Williams RB (IR); Rookies in italics 53 active, 13 reserve, 6 practice squad

== Regular season ==
=== Schedule ===
Week	Date	Opponent	Result	Record	Venue	Attendance
1	September 11	at Detroit Lions	L 3–17	0–1	Ford Field	61,877
2	September 18	Cleveland Browns	L 24–26	0–2	Lambeau Field	70,400
3	September 25	Tampa Bay Buccaneers	L 16–17	0–3	Lambeau Field	70,518
4	October 3	at Carolina Panthers	L 29–32	0–4	Bank of America Stadium	73,657
5	October 9	New Orleans Saints	W 52–3	1–4	Lambeau Field	70,580
6	Bye					
7	October 23	at Minnesota Vikings	L 20–23	1–5	Hubert H. Humphrey Metrodome	64,278
8	October 30	at Cincinnati Bengals	L 14–21	1–6	Paul Brown Stadium	65,940
9	November 6	Pittsburgh Steelers	L 10–20	1–7	Lambeau Field	70,607
10	November 13	at Atlanta Falcons	W 33–25	2–7	Georgia Dome	71,001
11	November 21	Minnesota Vikings	L 17–20	2–8	Lambeau Field	70,610
12	November 27	at Philadelphia Eagles	L 14–19	2–9	Lincoln Financial Field	67,665
13	December 4	at Chicago Bears	L 7–19	2–10	Soldier Field	62,177
14	December 11	Detroit Lions	W 16–13 (OT)	3–10	Lambeau Field	70,019
15	December 19	at Baltimore Ravens	L 3–48	3–11	M&T Bank Stadium	70,604
16	December 25	Chicago Bears	L 17–24	3–12	Lambeau Field	69,757
17	January 1	Seattle Seahawks	W 23–17	4–12	Lambeau Field	69,928

=== Week 1: at Detroit Lions ===
Week 1: Green Bay Packers at Detroit Lions – Game summary

Quarter	1	2	3	4	Total
Packers	0	3	0	0	3
Lions	7	0	3	7	17

at Ford Field, Detroit, Michigan

- Date: September 11
- Game time: 3:15 CDT/4:15 p.m. EDT
- Game weather: None (indoor stadium)
- Game attendance: 61,877
- Referee: Jeff Triplette (42)
- TV announcers (Fox): Kenny Albert, Brian Baldinger, and Chris Myers
- Recap, Game Book

Game information

First quarter

- DET – Marcus Pollard 9-yard pass from Joey Harrington (Jason Hanson kick), 4:56. Lions 7–0. Drive: 8 plays, 68 yards, 3:54.

Second quarter

- GB – Ryan Longwell 50-yard field goal, 2:59. Lions 7–3. Drive: 11 plays, 37 yards, 4:51.

Third quarter

- DET – Jason Hanson 21-yard field goal, 8:34. Lions 10–3. Drive: 10 plays, 31 yards, 4:44.

Fourth quarter

- DET – Mike Williams 3-yard pass from Joey Harrington (Jason Hanson kick), 4:13. Lions 17–3. Drive: 7 plays, 58 yards, 3:22.

Top passers

- GB – Brett Favre – 27/44, 201 yards, 2 INT
- DET – Joey Harrington – 15/28, 167 yards, 2 TD

Top rushers

- GB – Ahman Green – 12 rushes, 58 yards
- DET – Kevin Jones – 25 rushes, 87 yards

Top receivers

- GB – Donald Driver – 4 receptions, 48 yards
- DET – Marcus Pollard – 5 receptions, 58 yards, TD

The Packers opened the 2005 NFL season with a loss to the Detroit Lions. Starting wide receiver Javon Walker injured his right knee and did not play the rest of the season. This would be the Lions last win over the Packers until the 2010 season.

=== Week 2: vs. Cleveland Browns ===
Quarter	1	2	3	4	Total
Browns	7	6	6	7	26
Packers	7	0	0	17	24

at Lambeau Field, Green Bay, Wisconsin

- TV announcers (CBS): Jim Nantz, Phil Simms, and Bonnie Bernstein

The Packers lost this game to the Cleveland Browns as quarterback Trent Dilfer threw for 336 yards. The Packers retired the great Reggie White's number 92 at halftime after his unexpected death in December 2004.

=== Week 3: vs. Tampa Bay Buccaneers ===
Quarter	1	2	3	4	Total
Buccaneers	7	10	0	0	17
Packers	6	7	0	3	16

at Lambeau Field, Green Bay, Wisconsin

- TV announcers (Fox): Joe Buck, Troy Aikman, and Pam Oliver

The Tampa Bay Buccaneers won this close game as Carnell Williams rushed for 158 yards. Packers kicker Ryan Longwell missed an extra point and a field goal. It was the Buccaneers' first victory at Lambeau Field since 1989. It was also the Packers' first 0–3 start since 1988.

=== Week 4: at Carolina Panthers ===
Quarter	1	2	3	4	Total
Packers	7	0	6	16	29
Panthers	7	16	3	6	32

at Bank of America Stadium, Charlotte, North Carolina

- TV announcers (ABC): Al Michaels, John Madden, Michele Tafoya, and Sam Ryan

The Carolina Panthers caused the worst start in 17 years for the Packers as they could not complete a fourth quarter comeback to win the game. The Packers lost promising rookie Terrence Murphy in a career ending helmet to helmet collision on a kick return.

=== Week 5: vs. New Orleans Saints ===
Quarter	1	2	3	4	Total
Saints	3	0	0	0	3
Packers	14	21	10	7	52

at Lambeau Field, Green Bay, Wisconsin

- TV announcers (Fox): Kenny Albert, Brian Baldinger, and Drew Smith

After starting the season 0–4, the Packers defeat the New Orleans Saints in this blowout. Running back Najeh Davenport ended his season with an ankle injury in the second quarter. This was the largest blowout in Brett Favre's career.

This game marked the first NFL game that Aaron Rodgers played.

=== Week 7: at Minnesota Vikings ===
Quarter	1	2	3	4	Total
Packers	0	17	0	3	20
Vikings	0	0	10	13	23

at Hubert H. Humphrey Metrodome, Minneapolis, Minnesota

- TV announcers (Fox): Sam Rosen and Bill Maas

The Minnesota Vikings scored 23 second-half points after being shut out 17–0 in the first half. Paul Edinger kicked a career-long 56-yard field goal as time ran out to win the game. Packers running back Ahman Green ended his season with a career-threatening knee injury.

=== Week 8: at Cincinnati Bengals ===
Quarter	1	2	3	4	Total
Packers	0	7	0	7	14
Bengals	7	7	0	7	21

at Paul Brown Stadium, Cincinnati, Ohio

- TV announcers (Fox): Sam Rosen and Bill Maas

Brett Favre threw five interceptions as the Cincinnati Bengals won this close game. It is also noteworthy for the fact that a fan ran onto the field in the closing moments of the 4th quarter and disrupted the game by taking the ball away from Favre.

=== Week 9: vs. Pittsburgh Steelers ===
Quarter	1	2	3	4	Total
Steelers	6	7	0	7	20
Packers	3	0	7	0	10

at Lambeau Field, Green Bay, Wisconsin

- TV announcers (CBS): Jim Nantz, Phil Simms, and Bonnie Bernstein

The Pittsburgh Steelers, who were held without a third down conversion, forced three turnovers that turned into 17 points to help them defeat the Packers. Packers running back Samkon Gado scored his first career touchdown and ended the day with 62 yards.

=== Week 10: at Atlanta Falcons ===
Team	1	2	3	4	Total
• Packers	14	3	6	10	33
Falcons	0	14	0	11	25

- Date: November 13
- Location: Georgia Dome, Atlanta, Georgia
- Game start: 4:15 p.m. EST
- Game weather: indoors (dome)
- Referee: Bernie Kukar
- TV announcers (Fox): Dick Stockton, Daryl Johnston, and Tony Siragusa

Scoring summary
1	GB	Samkon Gado 9-yard run (Ryan Longwell kick)	Packers 7–0
1	GB	Samkon Gado 1-yard pass from Brett Favre (Ryan Longwell kick)	Packers 14–0
2	ATL	Warrick Dunn 21-yard pass from Michael Vick (Todd Peterson kick)	Packers 14–7
2	ATL	Michael Vick 1-yard run (Todd Peterson kick)	Tie 14–14
2	GB	Ryan Longwell 46-yard field goal	Packers 17–14
3	GB	Ryan Longwell 23-yard field goal	Packers 20–14
3	GB	Ryan Longwell 53-yard field goal	Packers 23–14
4	ATL	Todd Peterson 37-yard field goal	Packers 23–17
4	GB	Ryan Longwell 51-yard field goal	Packers 26–17
4	GB	Samkon Gado 2-yard run (Ryan Longwell kick)	Packers 33–17
4	ATL	Roddy White 19-yard pass from Michael Vick (Michael Vick–Brian Finneran pass)	Packers 33–25

On his 24th birthday, running back Samkon Gado made his first career start against the Atlanta Falcons and finished the day with 103 yards and three touchdowns to help the Packers win their second game of the year.

=== Week 11: vs. Minnesota Vikings ===
Quarter	1	2	3	4	Total
Vikings	0	7	7	6	20
Packers	7	7	0	3	17

at Lambeau Field, Green Bay, Wisconsin

- TV announcers (ABC): Al Michaels, John Madden, Michele Tafoya and Sam Ryan

The Minnesota Vikings won their second game against the Packers with another field goal as time expired. The Packers had only 21 yards rushing.

=== Week 12: at Philadelphia Eagles ===
Quarter	1	2	3	4	Total
Packers	7	7	0	0	14
Eagles	10	0	3	6	19

at Lincoln Financial Field, Philadelphia, Pennsylvania

- TV announcers (Fox): Joe Buck, Troy Aikman, and Pam Oliver

The Philadelphia Eagles beat the Packers as backup quarterback Mike McMahon led his team to victory.

=== Week 13: at Chicago Bears ===
Quarter	1	2	3	4	Total
Packers	0	7	0	0	7
Bears	0	9	0	10	19

at Soldier Field, Chicago, Illinois

- TV announcers (Fox): Dick Stockton and Daryl Johnston

The Chicago Bears beat the Packers at Soldier Field for the first time since 1993.

=== Week 14: vs. Detroit Lions ===
Quarter	1	2	3	4	OT	Total
Lions	13	0	0	0	0	13
Packers	3	7	0	3	3	16

at Lambeau Field, Green Bay, Wisconsin

- TV announcers (ESPN): Mike Patrick, Joe Theismann, Paul Maguire and Suzy Kolber

Samkon Gado helped the Packers win this overtime game over the Detroit Lions by rushing for 171 yards and a touchdown.

=== Week 15: at Baltimore Ravens ===
Quarter	1	2	3	4	Total
Packers	3	0	0	0	3
Ravens	14	10	10	14	48

at M&T Bank Stadium, Baltimore, Maryland

- TV announcers (ABC): Al Michaels, John Madden, and Sam Ryan

The Baltimore Ravens beat the Packers by 45 points as Kyle Boller passes for 253 yards and three touchdowns.

=== Week 16: vs. Chicago Bears ===
Quarter	1	2	3	4	Total
Bears	7	7	10	0	24
Packers	0	7	0	10	17

at Lambeau Field, Green Bay, Wisconsin

- TV announcers (Fox): Sam Rosen and Bill Maas

With the loss, the Packers were swept by the Bears for the first time since 1991.

=== Week 17: vs. Seattle Seahawks ===
Quarter	1	2	3	4	Total
Seahawks	0	7	7	3	17
Packers	6	7	7	3	23

at Lambeau Field, Green Bay, Wisconsin

- TV announcers (Fox): Curt Menefee, J.C. Pearson, and Drew Smith

The Packers win their last game of the season over the Seattle Seahawks. Packers fans gave Brett Favre a standing ovation at the beginning and end of the game as it was possibly his last game, which turned out not to be the case.

== Standings ==
NFC North
	W	L	T	PCT	DIV	CONF	PF	PA	STK
^{(2)} Chicago Bears	11	5	0	.688	5–1	10–2	260	202	L1
Minnesota Vikings	9	7	0	.563	5–1	8–4	306	344	W1
Detroit Lions	5	11	0	.313	1–5	3–9	254	345	L1
Green Bay Packers	4	12	0	.250	1–5	4–8	298	344	W1

== Season statistical leaders ==
- Passing yards: Brett Favre 3,881 Yards
- Passing touchdowns: Brett Favre 20 TD
- QB rating: Brett Favre, 70.9
- Rushing yards: Samkon Gado, 582 Yards
- Rushing touchdowns: Samkon Gado, 6 TD
- Receiving yards: Donald Driver, 1,221 Yards
- Receiving touchdowns: Donald Driver, 5 TD
- Points: Ryan Longwell, 90 points
- Kickoff return yards: Ahmad Carroll, 390 Yards
- Punt return yards: Antonio Chatman, 381 Yards
- Tackles: Nick Barnett, 91 Tackles
- Sacks: Kabeer Gbaja-Biamila, 8.0 Sacks
- Interceptions: Al Harris, 3 Interceptions

=== NFC leaders ===
- Brett Favre, NFC leader, Attempts (607)
- Brett Favre, NFC leader, Completions (372)
- Brett Favre, NFC leader, Passing yards (3,881)
- Brett Favre, NFC leader (tied), Interceptions (29)
