= 2004 Green Bay Packers season =

NFL team season

- General manager: Mike Sherman
- Head coach: Mike Sherman
- Home stadium: Lambeau Field

Results
- Record: 10–6
- Division place: 1st NFC North
- Playoffs: Lost Wild Card Playoffs (vs. Vikings) 17–31
- All-Pros: 1: FB William Henderson (1st team)
- Pro Bowlers: 4: RB Ahman Green; FB William Henderson; WR Javon Walker; G Marco Rivera

Uniform

The 2004 season was the Green Bay Packers' 84th in the National Football League (NFL) and their 86th overall. The team started the season by losing four of their first five games, before winning their next six in a row, followed by victories over their three divisional opponents in their last five to finish with a 10–6 record and qualify for the playoffs for the fourth year in a row. As the number three seed in the NFC, they hosted their divisional rivals, the Minnesota Vikings in the Wild Card round, but lost 31–17; it was the second time the Packers had lost a playoff game at Lambeau Field.

== Offseason ==
The Packers did not make many offseason moves, signing safety Mark Roman, cornerback Chris Watson, as well as quarterback Tim Couch who was cut after the preseason. They lost punter Josh Bidwell and safety Antuan Edwards to free agency and released defensive tackle Gilbert Brown, defensive end Jamal Reynolds, and wide receiver Travis Williams.

Additions	Subtractions
FS Mark Roman (Bengals)	FS Marques Anderson (Raiders)
QB Tim Couch (Browns)	S Antuan Edwards (Dolphins)
CB Chris Watson (Lions)	P Josh Bidwell (Buccaneers)
P Bryan Barker (Redskins)	LB Marcus Wilkins (Cardinals)

=== NFL draft ===
With the 25th pick of the 2004 NFL draft, the Packers selected cornerback Ahmad Carroll from the University of Arkansas.

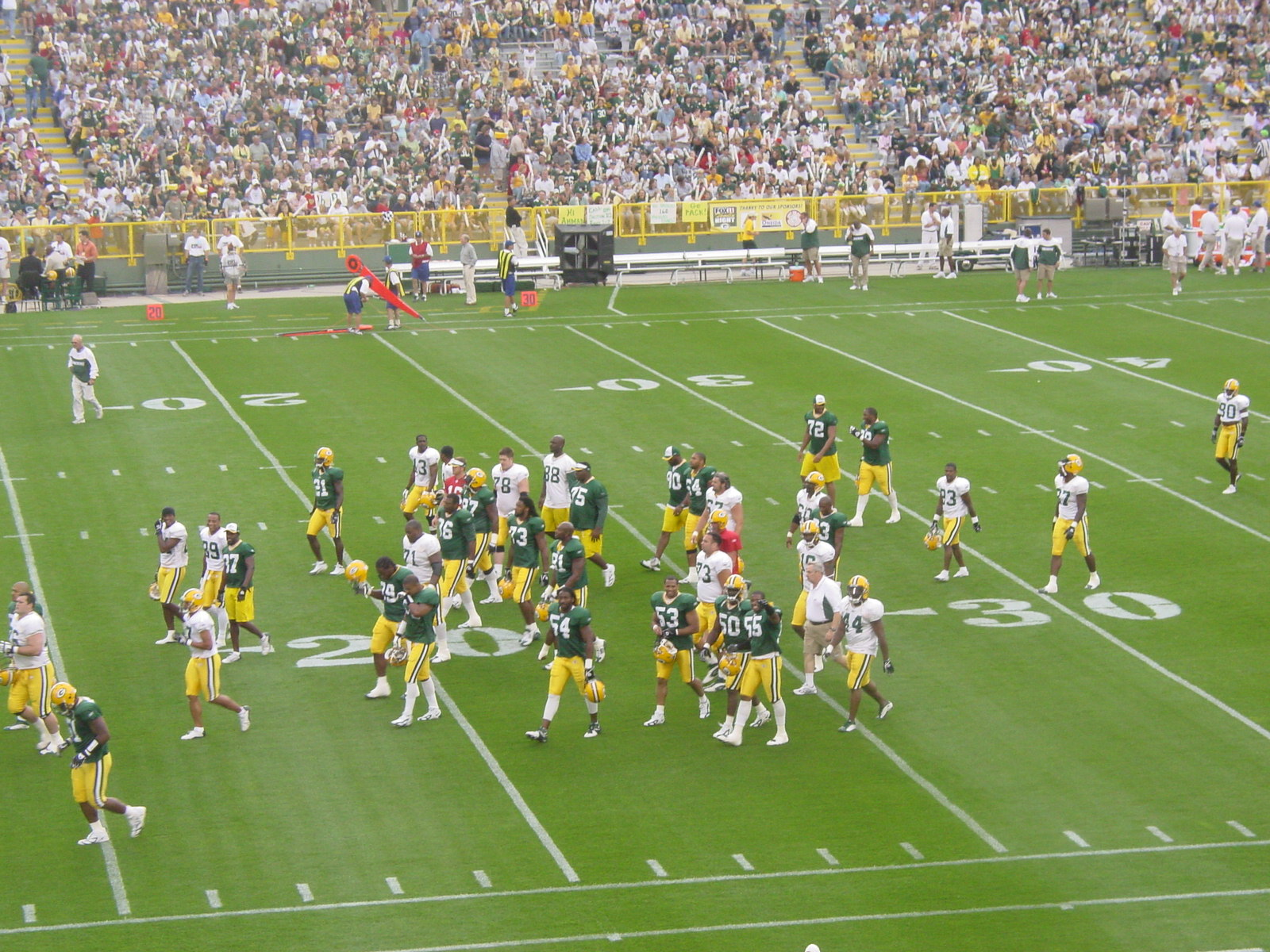
The team leaving the field after the inter-squad scrimmage in preseason, August 2004

2004 Green Bay Packers draft
Round	Pick	Player	Position	College	Notes
1	25	Ahmad Carroll	CB	Arkansas	
3	70	Joey Thomas	CB	Montana State	
3	72	Donnell Washington	DT	Clemson	
3	87	B.J. Sander	P	Ohio State	
6	179	Corey Williams	DT	Arkansas State	
7	251	Scott Wells	C	Tennessee	
Made roster † Pro Football Hall of Fame * Made at least one Pro Bowl during career

=== Undrafted free agents ===
2004 undrafted free agents of note
Player	Position	College
Sam Breeden	Wide receiver	Northwest Oklahoma State
Kris Briggs	Fullback	SMU
Nathan Chapman	Punter	
Chris Day	Wide receiver	Grambling State
Junior Glymph	Defensive end	Carson–Newman
Joe Hayes	Offensive tackle	San Jose State
Atlas Herrion	Guard	Alabama
Jason Hilliard	Offensive tackle	Louisville
Vonta Leach	Fullback	East Carolina
Scott McBrien	Quarterback	Maryland

== Personnel ==
=== Staff ===
2004 Green Bay Packers staff
Front office: President and chief executive officer – Bob Harlan; Executive vice president and chief operating officer – John Jones; Vice president of player finance/general counsel – Andrew Brandt; Director of college scouting – John Dorsey; Director of pro personnel – Reggie McKenzie; Personnel analyst to general manager – John Schneider; Assistant director of college scouting – Shaun Herock; Assistant director of pro personnel – Marc Lillibridge; Head coaches: Executive vice president/general manager/head coach – Mike Sherman; Assistant Head Coach/Defensive Coordinator – Bob Slowik; Offensive coaches: Offensive coordinator – Tom Rossley; Quarterbacks – Darrell Bevell; Running backs – Johnny Roland; Wide receivers – Ray Sherman; Tight ends/assistant offensive line – Joe Philbin; Offensive line – Larry Beightol; Assistant offensive line/quality control – James Campen	Defensive coaches: Defensive line – Jethro Franklin; Assistant defensive line – Brad Miller; Linebackers – Mark Duffner; Defensive backs – Kurt Schottenheimer; Assistant defensive backs – Lionel Washington; Special assistant – Vince Tobin; Special teams coaches: Special teams coordinator – John Bonamego; Special teams consultant – Frank Novak; Strength and conditioning: Strength and conditioning – Barry Rubin; Strength and conditioning assistant – Mark Lovat; Weight room assistant – Vince Workman

=== Roster ===
2004 Green Bay Packers roster
Quarterbacks (QB): 4 Brett Favre; 16 Craig Nall; 7 J.T. O'Sullivan; Running backs (RB): 44 Najeh Davenport; 40 Tony Fisher; 30 Ahman Green; 33 William Henderson FB; 48 Vonta Leach FB; 22 Nick Luchey FB; Wide receivers (WR): 83 Antonio Chatman; 80 Donald Driver; 89 Robert Ferguson; 81 Andrae Thurman; 84 Javon Walker; Tight ends (TE): 88 Bubba Franks; 85 Sean McHugh; 82 Ben Steele	Offensive linemen (OL): 71 Kevin Barry RT; 72 Brad Bedell G; 76 Chad Clifton LT; 78 Steve Morley G; 67 Grey Ruegamer C; 62 Marco Rivera RG; 65 Mark Tauscher RT; 68 Mike Wahle LG; 63 Scott Wells C; Defensive linemen (DL): 90 Colin Cole DT; 94 Kabeer Gbaja-Biamila DE; 97 Cletidus Hunt DT; 74 Aaron Kampman DE; 75 Grady Jackson DT; 77 Cullen Jenkins DT; 98 Kenny Peterson DE; 91 R-Kal Truluck DE; 99 Corey Williams DT	Linebackers (LB): 56 Nick Barnett MLB; 59 Na'il Diggs OLB; 54 Steve Josue OLB; 53 Paris Lenon OLB; 50 Hannibal Navies OLB; 55 Nick Rogers LB; Defensive backs (DB): 28 Ahmad Carroll CB; 31 Al Harris CB; 27 Michael Hawthorne CB; 26 Jason Horton CB; 37 Chris Johnson CB; 21 Bhawoh Jue FS; 23 Mark Roman SS; 42 Darren Sharper FS; 24 Joey Thomas CB; 25 James Whitley CB; Special teams (ST): 9 Bryan Barker P; 60 Rob Davis LS; 8 Ryan Longwell K; 11 B. J. Sander P	Practice squad: 41 Julius Curry S; 47 Ike Emodi LB; 57 Atlas Herrion G; 2 Jamal Jones WR; 13 Kelvin Kight WR (IR); -- Mike Marker WR; 45 Nick McNeil LB; 38 Chris Robertson RB; -- Art Smith G; Reserve: 69 Brennan Curtin OT (IR); 17 Shockmain Davis WR (IR); 58 Mike Flanagan C (IR); 64 James Lee DT (IR); 51 Torrance Marshall MLB (IR); 87 David Martin TE (IR); 18 Doug Pederson QB (IR); 95 Donnell Washington DT (IR); 32 Walter Williams RB (IR); Rookies in italics 53 active, 10 reserve, 8 practice squad

== Schedule ==
=== Regular season ===
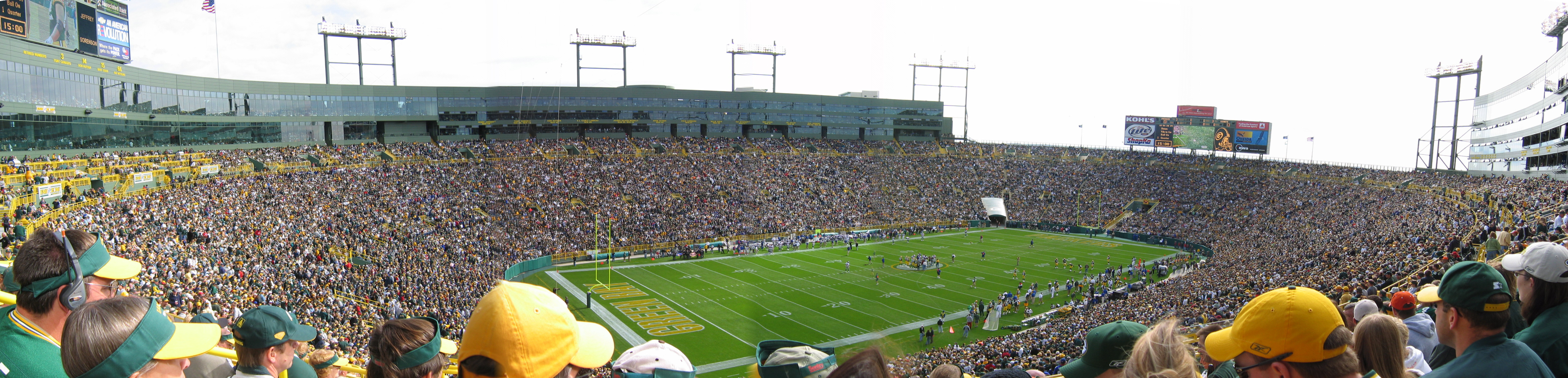
Panorama of Lambeau Field during the week 4 game between Green Bay and the New York Giants, October 3

Week	Date	Opponent	Result	Venue	Attendance
1	September 13	at Carolina Panthers	W 24–14	Bank of America Stadium	73,656
2	September 19	Chicago Bears	L 10–21	Lambeau Field	70,688
3	September 26	at Indianapolis Colts	L 31–45	RCA Dome	57,280
4	October 3	New York Giants	L 7–14	Lambeau Field	70,623
5	October 11	Tennessee Titans	L 27–48	Lambeau Field	70,420
6	October 17	at Detroit Lions	W 38–10	Ford Field	62,938
7	October 24	Dallas Cowboys	W 41–20	Lambeau Field	70,679
8	October 31	at Washington Redskins	W 28–14	FedExField	89,295
9	Bye week				
10	November 14	Minnesota Vikings	W 34–31	Lambeau Field	70,671
11	November 21	at Houston Texans	W 16–13	Reliant Stadium	70,769
12	November 29	St. Louis Rams	W 45–17	Lambeau Field	70,385
13	December 5	at Philadelphia Eagles	L 17–47	Lincoln Financial Field	67,723
14	December 12	Detroit Lions	W 16–13	Lambeau Field	70,497
15	December 19	Jacksonville Jaguars	L 25–28	Lambeau Field	70,437
16	December 24	at Minnesota Vikings	W 34–31	Hubert H. Humphrey Metrodome	64,311
17	January 2, 2005	at Chicago Bears	W 31–14	Soldier Field	62,197

=== Playoffs ===
Week	Date	Opponent	Result	Venue	Attendance
Wild Card	January 9, 2005	Minnesota Vikings	L 17–31	Lambeau Field	71,075

== Game summaries ==
=== Week 1 ===
Team	1	2	3	4	Total
• Packers	3	7	14	0	24
Panthers	0	7	0	7	14

- Date: September 13
- Location: Bank of America Stadium, Charlotte, North Carolina
- Game start: 9:00 p.m.
- Game attendance: 73,656
- Game weather: 71 °F (22 °C); wind 7 mph (11 km/h)
- Referee: Walt Coleman
- TV announcers (ABC): Al Michaels, John Madden, & Michele Tafoya

Scoring summary
Q1	3:28	GB	Ryan Longwell 41 yard field goal	GB 3–0
Q2	7:43	CAR	Brad Hoover 1 yard pass from Jake Delhomme (John Kasay kick)	CAR 7–3
Q2	3:25	GB	Ahman Green 6 yard run (Ryan Longwell kick)	GB 10–7
Q3	10:59	GB	Ahman Green 3 yard run (Ryan Longwell kick)	GB 17–7
Q3	2:01	GB	Ahman Green 3 yard pass from Brett Favre (Ryan Longwell kick)	GB 24–7
Q4	4:46	CAR	Muhsin Muhammad 30 yard pass from Jake Delhomme (John Kasay kick)	GB 24–14

Ahman Green 33 Rush, 119 Yds

=== Week 2 ===
Team	1	2	3	4	Total
• Bears	0	14	7	0	21
Packers	3	0	7	0	10

- Date: September 19
- Location: Lambeau Field
- Game start: 1:00 p.m.
- Game attendance: 70,688
- Game weather: 74 °F (23 °C), wind 15 mph (24 km/h)
- Referee: Bernie Kukar
- TV announcers (Fox): Dick Stockton, Daryl Johnston, and Tony Siragusa

Scoring summary
1	GB	Ryan Longwell 25 yard field goal	Packers 3–0
2	Chi	Bryan Johnson 11 yard pass from Rex Grossman (Paul Edinger kick)	Bears 7–3
2	Chi	Mike Brown 95 yard fumble return (Paul Edinger kick)	Bears 14–3
3	Chi	Thomas Jones 1 yard run (Paul Edinger kick)	Bears 21–3
3	GB	Robert Ferguson 18 yard pass from Brett Favre (Ryan Longwell kick)	Bears 21–10

=== Week 3 ===
Team	1	2	3	4	Total
Packers	14	3	7	7	31
• Colts	21	14	0	10	45

- Date: September 26
- Location: RCA Dome, Indianapolis, Indiana
- Game start: 4:25 p.m.
- Game attendance: 57,280
- Game weather: None, (Dome)
- Referee: Ed Hochuli
- TV announcers (Fox): Joe Buck, Troy Aikman, Cris Collinsworth & Pam Oliver

Scoring summary
1	Ind	Reggie Wayne 36 yard pass from Peyton Manning (Mike Vanderjagt kick)	Colts 7–0
1	GB	Javon Walker 36 yard pass from Brett Favre (Ryan Longwell kick)	Tie 7–7
1	Ind	Marvin Harrison 28 yard pass from Peyton Manning (Mike Vanderjagt kick)	Colts 14–7
1	GB	Javon Walker 79 yard pass from Brett Favre (Ryan Longwell kick)	Tie 14–14
1	Ind	Brandon Stokley 34 yard pass from Peyton Manning (Mike Vanderjagt kick)	Colts 21–14
2	Ind	Brandon Stokley 27 yard pass from Peyton Manning (Mike Vanderjagt kick)	Colts 28–14
2	GB	Ryan Longwell 38 yard field goal	Colts 28–17
2	Ind	James Mungro 1 yard pass from Peyton Manning (Mike Vanderjagt kick)	Colts 35–17
3	GB	Javon Walker 12 yard pass from Brett Favre (Ryan Longwell kick)	Colts 35–24
4	Ind	Mike Vanderjagt 45 yard field goal	Colts 38–24
4	GB	Donald Driver 27 yard pass from Brett Favre (Ryan Longwell kick)	Colts 38–31
4	Ind	Edgerrin James 1 yard run (Mike Vanderjagt kick)	Colts 45–31

=== Week 4 ===
Team	1	2	3	4	Total
• Giants	0	0	7	7	14
Packers	0	0	7	0	7

- Date: October 3
- Location: Lambeau Field
- Game start: 1:00 p.m.
- Game attendance: 70,623
- Game weather: 61 °F (16 °C), wind 18 mph (29 km/h)
- Referee: Pete Morelli
- TV announcers (Fox): Joe Buck, Troy Aikman, Cris Collinsworth & Pam Oliver

Scoring summary
3	GB	Javon Walker 28 yard pass from Brett Favre (Ryan Longwell) kick	Packers 7–0
3	NYG	Tiki Barber 52 yard run (Steve Christie kick)	Tie 7–7
4	NYG	Jeremy Shockey 4 yard pass from Kurt Warner (Steve Christie kick)	Giants 14–7

=== Week 5 ===
Team	1	2	3	4	Total
• Titans	17	10	7	14	48
Packers	3	10	0	14	27

- Date: October 11
- Location: Lambeau Field
- Game start: 9:00 p.m.
- Game attendance: 70,420
- Game weather: 50 °F (10 °C), wind 2 mph (3.2 km/h)
- Referee: Bill Vinovich
- TV announcers (ABC): Al Michaels, John Madden, & Michele Tafoya

Scoring summary
1	Ten	Chris Brown 37 yard run (Gary Anderson) kick	Titans 7–0
1	Ten	Chris Brown 29 yard run (Gary Anderson kick)	Titans 14–0
1	Ten	Gary Anderson 36 yard field goal	Titans 17–0
1	GB	Ryan Longwell 39 yard field goal	Titans 17–3
2	Ten	Troy Fleming 14 yard pass from Steve McNair (Gary Anderson kick)	Titans 24–3
2	GB	Bubba Franks 1 yard pass from Brett Favre (Ryan Longwell kick)	Titans 24–10
2	Ten	Gary Anderson 38 yard field goal	Titans 27–10
2	GB	Ryan Longwell 53 yard field goal	Titans 27–13
3	Ten	Eddie Berlin 11 yard pass from Steve McNair (Gary Anderson kick)	Titans 34–13
4	Ten	Derrick Mason 26 yard pass from Drew Bennett (Gary Anderson kick)	Titans 41–13
4	GB	Bubba Franks 11 yard pass from Brett Favre (Ryan Longwell kick)	Titans 41–20
4	Ten	Antowain Smith 15 yard run (Gary Anderson kick)	Titans 48–20
4	GB	Javon Walker 1 yard pass from Craig Nall (Ryan Longwell kick)	Titans 48–27

=== Week 6 ===
Team	1	2	3	4	Total
• Packers	7	10	14	7	38
Lions	7	3	0	0	10

- Date: October 17
- Location: Ford Field
- Game start: 1:00 p.m.
- Game attendance: 62,938
- Game weather: indoors (dome)
- Referee: Bill Leavy
- TV announcers (Fox): Dan Miller, Brian Baldinger, and Jennifer Hammond

Scoring summary
1	GB	Donald Driver 7 yard pass from Brett Favre (Ryan Longwell kick)	Packers 7–0
1	DET	Az-Zahir Hakim 28 yard pass from Joey Harrington (Jason Hanson kick)	Tie 7–7
2	GB	Tony Fisher 13 yard pass from Brett Favre (Ryan Longwell kick)	Packers 14–7
2	DET	Jason Hanson 48 yard field goal	Packers 14–10
2	GB	Ryan Longwell 50 yard field goal	Packers 17–10
3	GB	Darren Sharper 36 yard interception return (Ryan Longwell kick)	Packers 24–10
3	GB	Najeh Davenport 13 yard run (Ryan Longwell kick)	Packers 31–10
4	GB	Donald Driver 20 yard pass from Ahman Green (Ryan Longwell kick)	Packers 38–10

=== Week 7 ===
Team	1	2	3	4	Total
Cowboys	6	0	7	7	20
• Packers	3	17	21	0	41

- Date: October 24
- Location: Lambeau Field
- Game start: 4:15 p.m.
- Game attendance: 70,679
- Game weather: 55 °F (13 °C), wind 8 mph (13 km/h)
- Referee: Larry Nemmers
- TV announcers (Fox): Dick Stockton, Troy Aikman, Cris Collinsworth and Pam Oliver

Scoring summary
1	Dal	Billy Cundiff 46 yard field goal	Cowboys 3–0
1	GB	Ryan Longwell 26 yard field goal	Tie 3–3
1	Dal	Billy Cundiff 24 yard field goal	Cowboys 6–3
2	GB	Ahman Green 1 yard run (Ryan Longwell kick)	Packers 10–6
2	GB	Javon Walker 5 yard pass from Brett Favre (Ryan Longwell kick)	Packers 17–6
2	GB	Ryan Longwell 40 yard field goal	Packers 20–6
3	GB	Bubba Franks 8 yard pass from Tony Fisher (Ryan Longwell kick)	Packers 27–6
3	Dal	Jason Witten 42 yard pass from Vinny Testaverde (Billy Cundiff kick)	Packers 27–13
3	GB	Donald Driver 33 yard pass from Brett Favre (Ryan Longwell kick)	Packers 34–13
3	GB	Ahman Green 90 yard run (Ryan Longwell kick)	Packers 41–13
4	Dal	Eddie George 5 yard run (Billy Cundiff kick)	Packers 41–20

=== Week 8 ===
Team	1	2	3	4	Total
• Packers	3	14	3	8	28
Redskins	0	7	0	7	14

- Date: October 31
- Location: FedEx Field, Landover, Maryland
- Game start: 1:00 p.m.
- Game attendance: 89,295
- Game weather: 78 °F (26 °C); wind 9 mph (14 km/h)
- Referee: Tom White
- TV announcers (Fox): Dan Miller, Brian Baldinger, & Jay Glazer

Scoring summary
Q1	5:55	GB	Ryan Longwell 37 yard field goal	GB 3–0
Q2	13:41	GB	Ahman Green 1 yard run (Ryan Longwell kick)	GB 10–0
Q2	6:28	GB	Javon Walker 9 yard pass from Brett Favre (Ryan Longwell kick)	GB 17–0
Q2	1:50	Was	Rod Gardner 12 yard pass from Mark Brunell (Ola Kimrin kick)	GB 17–7
Q3	12:49	GB	Ryan Longwell 39 yard field goal	GB 20–7
Q4	4:46	Was	Rod Gardner 12 yard pass from Mark Brunell (Ola Kimrin kick)	GB 20–14
Q4	1:44	GB	Ahman Green 11 yard run (Robert Ferguson pass from Brett Favre)	GB 28–14

=== Week 10 ===
Team	1	2	3	4	Total
Vikings	7	3	7	14	31
• Packers	7	17	0	10	34

- Date: November 14
- Location: Lambeau Field
- Game start: 4:15 p.m.
- Game attendance: 70,671
- Game weather: 46 °F (8 °C), wind 7 mph (11 km/h)
- Referee: Ron Winter
- TV announcers (Fox): Joe Buck, Troy Aikman, Cris Collinsworth and Pam Oliver

Scoring summary
1	GB	Javon Walker 50 yard pass from Brett Favre (Ryan Longwell kick)	Packers 7–0
1	Min	Jermaine Wiggins 13 yard pass from Daunte Culpepper (Morten Anderson kick)	Tie 7–7
2	GB	Tony Fisher 2 yard pass from Brett Favre	Packers 14–7
2	Min	Morten Anderson 40 yard field goal	Packers 14–10
2	GB	Bubba Franks 17 yard pass from Brett Favre (Ryan Longwell kick)	Packers 21–10
2	GB	Ryan Longwell 43 yard field goal	Packers 24–10
3	Min	Nate Burleson 8 yard pass from Daunte Culpepper (Morten Anderson kick)	Packers 24–17
4	GB	William Henderson 6 yard pass from Brett Favre (Ryan Longwell kick)	Packers 31–17
4	Min	Onterrio Smith 2 yard pass from Daunte Culpepper (Morten Anderson kick)	Packers 31–24
4	Min	Moe Williams 17 yard pass from Daunte Culpepper (Ryan Longwell kick)	Tie 31–31
4	GB	Ryan Longwell 33 yard field goal	Packers 34–31

=== Week 11 ===
Team	1	2	3	4	Total
• Packers	0	3	0	13	16
Texans	0	13	0	0	13

- Date: November 21
- Location: Reliant Stadium
- Game start: 8:30 p.m.
- Game attendance: 70,769
- Game weather: indoors (dome)
- Referee: Pete Morelli
- TV announcers (ESPN): Mike Patrick, Joe Theismann, Paul Maguire, and Suzy Kolber

Scoring summary
2	GB	Ryan Longwell 23 yard field goal	Packers 3–0
2	Hou	Domanick Williams 6 yard pass from David Carr (Kris Brown kick)	Texans 7–3
2	Hou	Kris Brown 46 yard field goal	Texans 10–3
2	Hou	Kris Brown 40 yard field goal	Texans 13–3
4	GB	Donald Driver 24 yard pass from Brett Favre (Ryan Longwell kick)	Texans 13–10
4	GB	Ryan Longwell 39 yard field goal	Tie 13–13
4	GB	Ryan Longwell 46 yard field goal	Packers 16–13

=== Week 12 ===
Team	1	2	3	4	Total
Rams	0	10	0	7	17
• Packers	7	14	7	17	45

- Date: November 28
- Location: Lambeau Field, Green Bay, Wisconsin
- Game start: 9:00 p.m. EST
- Game attendance: 70,385
- Game weather: 27 °F (−3 °C) (Clear)
- Referee: Tony Corrente
- TV announcers (ABC): Al Michaels, John Madden, & Michele Tafoya

Scoring summary
Q1	12:23	GB	Ahmad Carroll 40 yard fumble return (Ryan Longwell kick)	GB 7–0
Q2	12:47	STL	Jeff Wilkins 34 yard field goal	GB 7–3
Q2	7:25	GB	Bubba Franks 7 yard pass from Brett Favre (Ryan Longwell kick)	GB 14–3
Q2	2:50	GB	Javon Walker 10 yard pass from Brett Favre (Ryan Longwell kick)	GB 21–3
Q2	:30	STL	Isaac Bruce 4 yard pass from Marc Bulger (Jeff Wilkins kick)	GB 21–10
Q3	1:44	GB	Donald Driver 16 yard pass from Brett Favre (Ryan Longwell kick)	GB 28–10
Q4	14:19	STL	Marshall Faulk 8 yard pass from Marc Bulger (Jeff Wilkins kick)	GB 28–17
Q4	8:29	GB	Ryan Longwell 27 yard field goal	GB 31–17
Q4	1:52	GB	Najeh Davenport 40 yard run (Ryan Longwell kick)	GB 38–17
Q4	:46	GB	Michael Hawthorne 34 yard fumble return (Ryan Longwell kick)	GB 45–17

- Brett Favre 18/27, 215 Yds, 3 TD (200th start)

=== Week 13 ===
Team	1	2	3	4	Total
Packers	0	3	0	14	17
• Eagles	7	28	9	3	47

- Date: December 5
- Location: Lincoln Financial Field, Philadelphia, Pennsylvania
- Game start: 4:25 p.m.
- Game attendance: 67,723
- Game weather: 55 °F (13 °C) (Clear)
- Referee: Scott Green
- TV announcers (Fox): Joe Buck, Troy Aikman, Cris Collinsworth & Pam Oliver

Scoring summary
1	Phi	Terrell Owens 41 yard pass from Donovan McNabb (David Akers kick)	Eagles 7–0
2	Phi	Brian Westbrook 9 yard pass from Donovan McNabb (David Akers kick)	Eagles 14–0
2	Phi	Brian Westbrook 41 yard pass from Donovan McNabb (David Akers kick)	Eagles 21–0
2	Phi	L.J. Smith 6 yard pass from Donovan McNabb (David Akers kick)	Eagles 28–0
2	Phi	Brian Westbrook 12 yard pass from Donovan McNabb (David Akers kick)	Eagles 35–0
2	GB	Ryan Longwell 40 yard field goal	Eagles 35–3
3	Phi	David Akers 22 yard field goal	Eagles 38–3
3	Phi	David Akers 45 yard field goal	Eagles 41–3
3	Phi	David Akers 47 yard field goal	Eagles 44–3
4	Phi	David Akers 22 yard field goal	Eagles 47–3
4	GB	William Henderson 1 yard pass from Craig Nall (Ryan Longwell kick)	Eagles 47–10
4	GB	Javon Walker 17 yard pass from Craig Nall (Ryan Longwell kick)	Eagles 47–17

=== Week 14 ===
Team	1	2	3	4	Total
Lions	3	10	0	0	13
• Packers	0	0	10	6	16

- Date: December 12
- Location: Lambeau Field
- Game start: 4:15 p.m.
- Game attendance: 70,497
- Game weather: 33 °F (1 °C), wind 28 mph (45 km/h)
- Referee: Larry Nemmers
- TV announcers (Fox): Dick Stockton, Daryl Johnston, and Tony Siragusa

Scoring summary
1	Det	Jason Hanson 31 yard field goal	Lions 3–0
2	Det	Kevin Jones 24 yard run (Jason Hanson kick)	Lions 10–0
2	Det	Jason Hanson 36 yard field goal	Lions 13–0
3	GB	Ryan Longwell 36 yard field goal	Lions 13–3
3	GB	Donald Driver 23 yard pass from Brett Favre (Ryan Longwell kick)	Lions 13–10
4	GB	Ryan Longwell 28 yard field goal	Tie 13–13
4	GB	Ryan Longwell 23 yard field goal	Packers 16–13

=== Week 15 ===
Team	1	2	3	4	Total
• Jaguars	7	7	7	7	28
Packers	0	10	7	8	25

- Date: December 19
- Location: Lambeau Field
- Game start: 4:15 p.m.
- Game attendance: 70.437
- Game weather: 12 °F (−11 °C), wind 13 mph (21 km/h)
- Referee: Ed Hochuli
- TV announcers (CBS): Dick Enberg, Dan Dierdorf, & Armen Keteyian

Scoring summary
1	Jax	Jimmy Smith 31 yard pass from Byron Leftwich (Josh Scobee kick)	Jaguars 7–0
2	GB	Ryan Longwell 35 yard field goal	Jaguars 7–3
2	GB	Darren Sharper 15 yard fumble return (Ryan Longwell kick)	Packers 10–7
2	Jax	Jimmy Smith 16 yard pass from Byron Leftwich (Josh Scobee kick)	Jaguars 14–10
3	GB	Donald Driver 32 yard pass from Brett Favre (Ryan Longwell kick)	Packers 17–14
3	Jax	Fred Taylor (Josh Scobee kick)	Jaguars 21–17
4	Jax	Greg Jones 1 yard run (Josh Scobee kick)	Jaguars 28–17
4	GB	Antonio Chatman 6 yard pass from Brett Favre (Donald Driver pass from Brett Favre)	Jaguars 28–25

=== Week 16 ===
Team	1	2	3	4	Total
• Packers	0	17	7	10	34
Vikings	0	21	0	10	31

- Date: December 24
- Location: Hubert H. Humphrey Metrodome, Minneapolis, Minnesota
- Game start: 3:00 p.m.
- Game attendance: 64,311
- Game weather: None, (Dome)
- Referee: Bill Leavy
- TV announcers (Fox): Joe Buck, Troy Aikman, Cris Collinsworth & Pam Oliver

Scoring summary
2	Min	Randy Moss 12 yard pass from Daunte Culpepper (Morten Anderson kick)	Vikings 7–0
2	GB	Ahman Green 1 yard run (Ryan Longwell kick)	Tie 7–7
2	Min	Nate Burleson 68 yard pass from Daunte Culpepeer (Morten Anderson kick)	Vikings 14–7
2	GB	Bubba Franks 22 yard pass from Brett Favre (Ryan Longwell kick)	Tie 14–14
2	Min	Michael Bennett 38 yard pass from Daunte Culpepper (Morten Anderson kick)	Vikings 21–14
2	GB	Ryan Longwell 42 yard field goal	Vikings 21–17
3	GB	Javon Walker 9 yard pass from Brett Favre (Ryan Longwell kick)	Packers 24–21
4	Min	Morten Anderson 29 yard field goal	Tie 24–24
4	Min	Chris Claiborne 15 yard interception return (Morten Anderson kick)	Vikings 31–24
4	GB	Donald Driver 3 yard pass from Brett Favre (Ryan Longwell kick)	Tie 31–31
4	GB	Ryan Longwell 29 yard field goal	Packers 34–31

=== Week 17 ===
Team	1	2	3	4	Total
• Packers	7	21	3	0	31
Bears	7	0	7	0	14

- Date: January 2
- Location: Soldier Field, Chicago, Illinois
- Game start: 1:00 p.m.
- Game attendance: 62,197
- Game weather: 43 °F (6 °C) • Wind 12 mph (19 km/h)
- Referee: Ron Winter
- TV announcers (Fox): Joe Buck, Troy Aikman, Cris Collinsworth, and Pam Oliver

Scoring summary
1	CHI	Thomas Jones 2 yard run (Paul Edinger kick)	Bears 7–0
1	GB	Bubba Franks 17 yard pass from Brett Favre (Ryan Longwell kick)	Tie 7–7
2	GB	William Henderson 38 yard pass from Brett Favre (Ryan Longwell kick)	Packers 14–7
2	GB	Darren Sharper 43 yard interception return (Ryan Longwell kick)	Packers 21–7
2	GB	Javon Walker 25 yard pass from Craig Nall (Ryan Longwell kick)	Packers 28–7
3	CHI	Thomas Jones 1 yard run (Paul Edinger kick)	Packers 28–14
3	GB	Ryan Longwell 20 yard field goal	Packers 31–14

=== Wild Card ===
Team	1	2	3	4	Total
• Vikings	17	7	0	7	31
Packers	3	7	0	7	17

- Date: January 9
- Location: Lambeau Field
- Game start: 4:40 p.m.
- Game attendance: 71,075
- Game weather: 26 °F (−3 °C), wind 4 mph (6.4 km/h)
- Referee: Walt Anderson
- TV announcers (Fox): Joe Buck, Troy Aikman, Cris Collinsworth and Pam Oliver

Scoring summary
1	Min	Moe Williams 68 yard pass from Daunte Culpepper (Morten Anderson kick)	Vikings 7–0
1	Min	Randy Moss 20 yard pass from Daunte Culpepper (Morten Anderson kick)	Vikings 14–0
1	Min	Morten Anderson 35 yard field goal	Vikings 17–0
1	GB	Ryan Longwell 43 yard field goal	Vikings 17–3
2	GB	Bubba Franks 4 yard pass from Brett Favre (Ryan Longwell kick)	Vikings 17–10
2	Min	Nate Burleson 19 yard pass from Daunte Culpepper (Morten Anderson kick)	Vikings 24–10
4	GB	Najeh Davenport 1 yard run (Ryan Longwell kick)	Vikings 24–17
4	Min	Randy Moss 34 yard pass from Daunte Culpepper (Morten Anderson kick)	Vikings 31–17

== Standings ==
NFC North
	W	L	T	PCT	DIV	CONF	PF	PA	STK
^{(3)} Green Bay Packers	10	6	0	.625	5–1	9–3	424	380	W2
^{(6)} Minnesota Vikings	8	8	0	.500	3–3	5–7	405	395	L2
Detroit Lions	6	10	0	.375	2–4	5–7	296	350	L1
Chicago Bears	5	11	0	.313	2–4	4–8	231	331	L4

NFC
#	Team	Division	W	L	T	PCT	DIV	CONF	SOS	SOV	STK
Division leaders
1	Philadelphia Eagles	East	13	3	0	.813	6–0	11–1	.453	.409	L2
2	Atlanta Falcons	South	11	5	0	.688	4–2	8–4	.420	.432	L2
3	Green Bay Packers	North	10	6	0	.625	5–1	9–3	.457	.419	W2
4	Seattle Seahawks	West	9	7	0	.563	3–3	8–4	.445	.368	W2
Wild cards
5 (Note: St. Louis clinched the NFC #5 seed instead of Minnesota or New Orleans based on better conference record (7–5 to Minnesota’s 5–7 to New Orleans’ 6–6).)	St. Louis Rams	West	8	8	0	.500	5–1	7–5	.488	.438	W2
6 (Note: Minnesota clinched the NFC #6 seed instead of New Orleans based on head-to-head victory.)	Minnesota Vikings	North	8	8	0	.500	3–3	5–7	.480	.406	L2
Did not qualify for the postseason
7	New Orleans Saints	South	8	8	0	.500	3–3	6–6	.465	.427	W4
8	Carolina Panthers	South	7	9	0	.438	3–3	6–6	.496	.366	L1
9 (Note: Detroit finished ahead of Arizona and New York Giants based upon head-to-head record (2–0 versus Arizona’s 1–1 and New York Giants’ 0–2). Division tiebreak was initially used to eliminate Dallas and Washington.)	Detroit Lions	North	6	10	0	.375	2–4	5–7	.496	.417	L2
10	Arizona Cardinals	West	6	10	0	.375	2–4	5–7	.461	.417	W1
11 (Note: New York Giants finished ahead of Dallas and Washington in the NFC East based on better head-to-head record (3–1 to Dallas‘ 2–2 to Washington’s 1–3).)	New York Giants	East	6	10	0	.375	3–3	5–7	.516	.417	W1
12 (Note: Dallas finished ahead of Washington in the NFC East based on head-to-head sweep.)	Dallas Cowboys	East	6	10	0	.375	2–4	5–7	.516	.375	L1
13	Washington Redskins	East	6	10	0	.375	1–5	6–6	.477	.333	W1
14 (Note: Tampa Bay finished ahead of Chicago based upon head-to-head victory.)	Tampa Bay Buccaneers	South	5	11	0	.313	2–4	4–8	.477	.413	L4
15	Chicago Bears	North	5	11	0	.313	2–4	4–8	.465	.388	L4
16	San Francisco 49ers	West	2	14	0	.125	2–4	2–10	.488	.375	L3
Tiebreakers (Note: When breaking ties for three or more teams under the NFL's rules, they are first broken within divisions, then comparing only the highest-ranked remaining team from each division.)

== Season statistical leaders ==
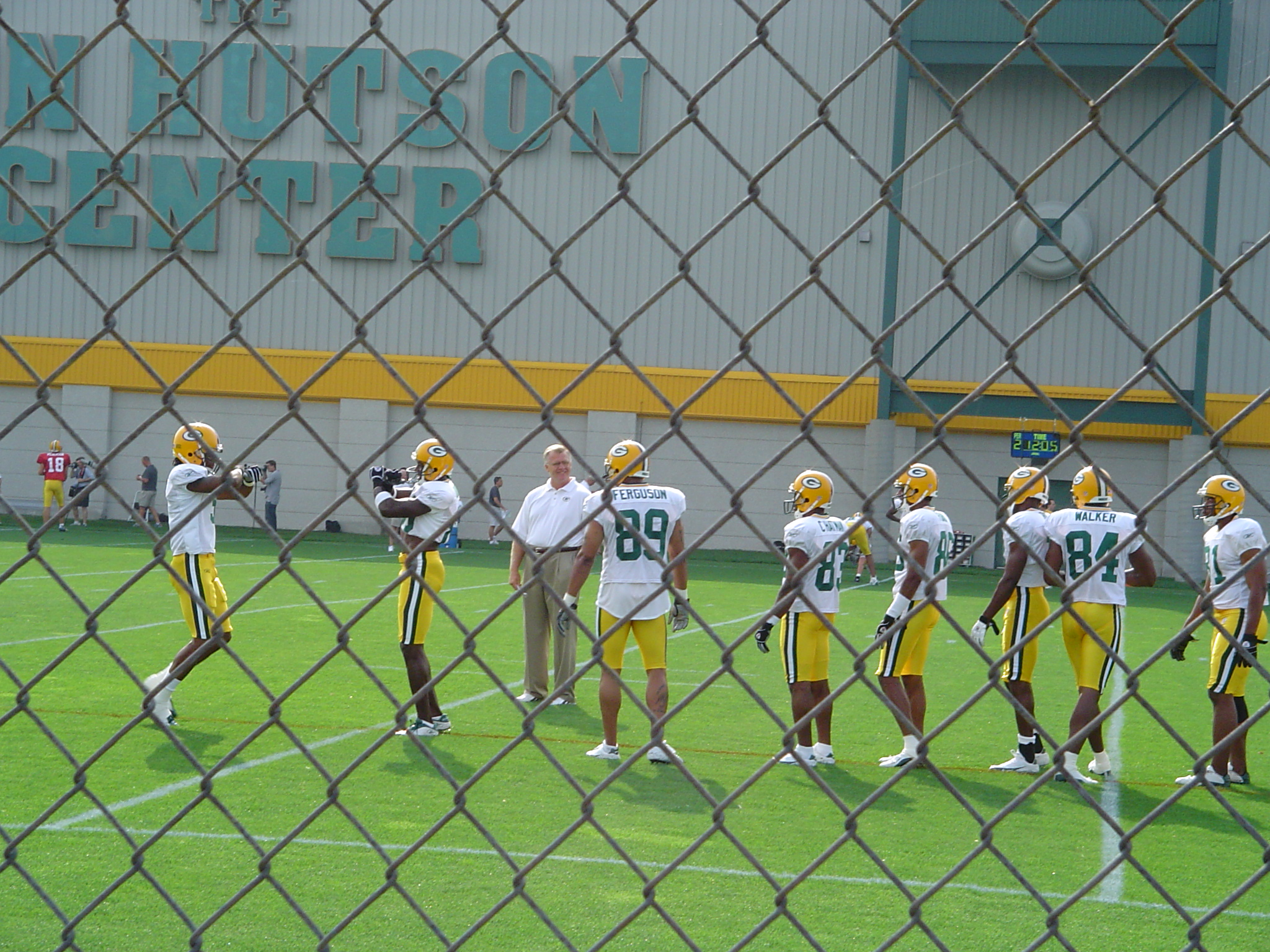
Training camp in August 2004. L-R: #89 wide receiver Robert Ferguson; #83 kick returner Antonio Chatman, #86 wide receiver Carl Ford, #84 wide receiver Javon Walker, and #81 wide receiver Andrae Thurman

- Passing Yards: Brett Favre 4,088 Yards
- Passing Touchdowns: Brett Favre 30 TD
- Rushing Yards: Ahman Green, 1,163 Yards
- Rushing Touchdowns: Ahman Green, 7 TD
- Receiving Yards: Javon Walker, 1,382 Yards
- Receiving Touchdowns: Javon Walker, 12 TD
- Points: Ryan Longwell, 120 points
- Kickoff Return Yards: Antonio Chatman, 565 Yards
- Punt Return Yards: Antonio Chatman, 242 Yards
- Tackles: Nick Barnett, 121 Tackles
- Sacks: Kabeer Gbaja-Biamila, 13.5 Sacks
- Interceptions: Darren Sharper, 4 Interceptions
