= List of William & Mary Tribe in the NFL draft =

This is a list of William & Mary Tribe football players in the NFL draft.

== Key ==
B	Back	K	Kicker	NT	Nose tackle
C	Center	LB	Linebacker	FB	Fullback
DB	Defensive back	P	Punter	HB	Halfback
DE	Defensive end	QB	Quarterback	WR	Wide receiver
DT	Defensive tackle	RB	Running back	G	Guard
E	End	T	Offensive tackle	TE	Tight end

== Selections ==
Year	Round	Pick	Overall	Player	Team	Position
1943	6	3	43	Harvey Johnson	Brooklyn Dodgers	B
1943	11	6	96	Glenn Knox	New York Giants	E
1943	14	4	124	Buster Ramsey	Chicago Cardinals	G
1943	16	1	141	Marvin Bass	Detroit Lions	T
1943	22	6	206	John Korczkowski	New York Giants	B
1944	13	9	129	Bob Longacre	Pittsburgh Steelers	B
1944	17	4	168	Jack Freeman	Philadelphia Eagles	B
1945	25	4	256	Bill Iancelli	Boston Yanks	E
1945	29	8	304	Nick Forkovitch	Chicago Bears	B
1946	10	8	88	Al Vandeweghe	Philadelphia Eagles	E
1946	11	3	93	Doc Holloway	Pittsburgh Steelers	G
1946	16	8	148	Buddy Hubbard	Philadelphia Eagles	B
1946	20	9	188	Dave Butcher	Philadelphia Eagles	B
1947	13	3	108	Bob Steckroth	Washington Redskins	E
1947	28	3	256	Ralph Sazio	Pittsburgh Steelers	T
1948	3	3	16	Tommy Thompson	Washington Redskins	C
1948	5	7	32	Knox Ramsey	Chicago Bears	G
1948	10	1	76	Stan Magdziak	New York Giants	B
1948	11	7	92	Jim McDowell	Chicago Bears	G
1948	18	10	165	Harry Caughron	Chicago Cardinals	T
1948	23	3	208	Lou Hoitsma	Washington Redskins	E
1948	26	8	243	Lou Creekmur	Philadelphia Eagles	T
1949	14	7	138	Pat Haggerty	Washington Redskins	E
1949	16	2	153	Jack Bruce	Boston Yanks	B
1950	3	7	34	George Hughes	Pittsburgh Steelers	G
1950	6	3	69	Jack Cloud	Green Bay Packers	B
1950	9	8	113	Vito Ragazzo	Chicago Cardinals	E
1950	10	12	130	Frank O'Pella	Cleveland Browns	B
1950	24	4	304	Jim McDowell	Detroit Lions	G
1951	17	6	201	Ted Gehlmann	Pittsburgh Steelers	T
1952	20	12	241	Ed Weber	Los Angeles Rams	B
1953	8	4	89	John Kreamcheck	Chicago Bears	T
1953	18	12	217	Ed Mioduszewski	Detroit Lions	B
1954	3	12	37	Bill Bowman	Detroit Lions	B
1954	5	12	61	George Parozzo	Detroit Lions	T
1954	19	1	218	Jerry Sazio	Chicago Cardinals	T
1954	22	5	258	Charlie Sumner	Chicago Bears	B
1954	28	1	326	Tom Koller	Chicago Cardinals	B
1955	7	10	83	Bruce Sturgess	Chicago Bears	B
1955	28	7	332	Al Crow	New York Giants	T
1956	6	1	62	Bob Lusk	Detroit Lions	C
1956	14	12	169	Charlie Sidwell	Cleveland Browns	B
1958	10	12	121	Elliot Schaubach	Detroit Lions	T
1959	17	1	193	Tom Secules	Green Bay Packers	B
1959	22	8	260	Lennie Rubels	Chicago Bears	B
1964	5	10	66	T. W. Alley	Pittsburgh Steelers	T
1964	11	10	150	Bob Soleau	Pittsburgh Steelers	G
1964	12	2	156	John Sapinsky	Philadelphia Eagles	T
1968	13	9	336	Dan Darragh	Buffalo Bills	QB
1968	16	4	412	Adin Brown	Denver Broncos	LB
1971	15	19	383	Andy Giles	Oakland Raiders	DE
1972	14	20	358	Dennis Cambal	Oakland Raiders	RB
1972	15	25	389	Bill Davis	Miami Dolphins	DT
1973	11	12	272	David Knight	New York Jets	WR
1974	16	15	405	Barry Beers	Kansas City Chiefs	G
1975	12	12	298	Richard Pawlewicz	Philadelphia Eagles	RB
1976	16	16	447	Craig McCurdy	Detroit Lions	LB
1982	3	28	83	John Cannon	Tampa Bay Buccaneers	DE
1985	10	9	261	Mark Kelso	Philadelphia Eagles	DB
1987	7	25	193	Archie Harris	Chicago Bears	T
1987	8	23	218	Pinball Clemons	Kansas City Chiefs	RB
1987	9	9	232	Ken Lambiotte	Philadelphia Eagles	QB
1991	7	3	170	Tyrone Shelton	Los Angeles Rams	RB
1992	4	28	112	Chris Hakel	Washington Redskins	QB
1997	2	30	60	Darren Sharper	Green Bay Packers	DB
2009	3	9	73	Derek Cox	Jacksonville Jaguars	DB
2010	6	15	184	Adrian Tracy	New York Giants	LB
2010	7	27	234	Sean Lissemore	Dallas Cowboys	DT
2013	4	17	114	B. W. Webb	Dallas Cowboys	DB
2015	7	28	245	Tre McBride	Tennessee Titans	WR
2016	6	10	185	DeAndre Houston-Carson	Chicago Bears	DB
2023	5	18	152	Colby Sorsdal	Detroit Lions	T
2025	3	35	99	Charles Grant	Las Vegas Raiders	T
