= Junius Coston =

American football player (born 1983)

No. 62
- Position: Guard

Personal information
- Born: November 5, 1983 (age 43); Raleigh, North Carolina, U.S.
- Listed height: 6 ft 3 in (1.91 m)
- Listed weight: 313 lb (142 kg)

Career information
- High school: Broughton (Raleigh)
- College: North Carolina A&T
- NFL draft: 2005: 5th round, 143rd overall pick

Career history
- Green Bay Packers (2005–2008); Oakland Raiders (2008); Detroit Lions (2008); Omaha Nighthawks (2010); Calgary Stampeders (2011)*; Edmonton Eskimos (2011)
- * Offseason or practice squad member only

Career NFL statistics
- Games played: 16
- Games started: 7
- Stats at Pro Football Reference

Junius Coston (born November 5, 1983) is an American former professional football player who was a guard in the National Football League (NFL) and Canadian Football League (CFL). He was selected 143rd overall by the Green Bay Packers in the fifth round of the 2005 NFL draft. He played high school football at Needham B. Broughton High School and college football for the North Carolina A&T Aggies.

Coston was also a member of the Oakland Raiders, Detroit Lions, Omaha Nighthawks, and Edmonton Eskimos.
