= Terrence Murphy (American football) =

American football player (born 1982)

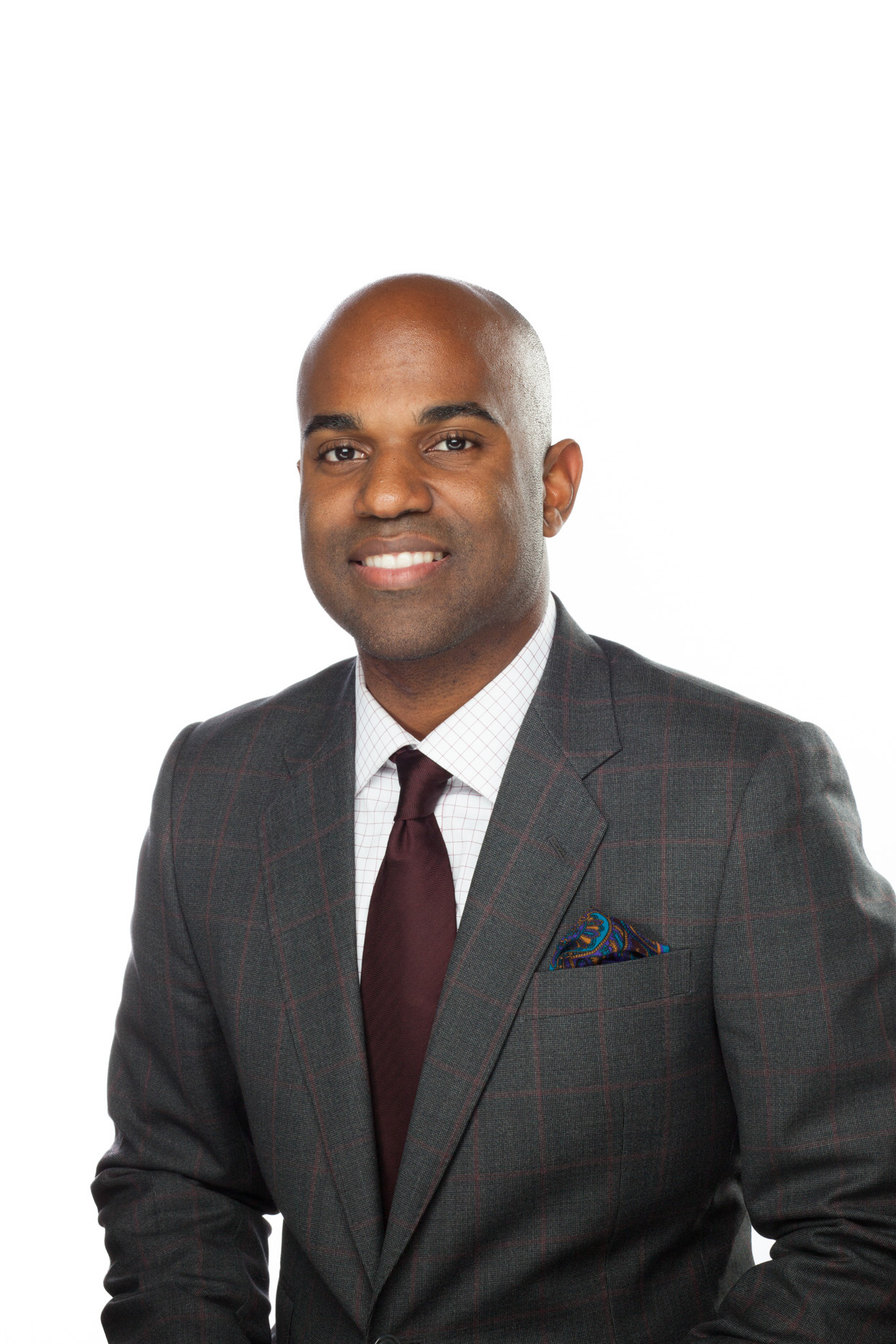

No. 85
- Position: Wide receiver

Personal information
- Born: December 15, 1982 (age 43); Tyler, Texas, U.S.
- Listed height: 6 ft 1 in (1.85 m)
- Listed weight: 202 lb (92 kg)

Career information
- High school: Chapel Hill (Tyler)
- College: Texas A&M
- NFL draft: 2005: 2nd round, 58th overall pick

Career history
- Green Bay Packers (2005)

Awards and highlights
- First-team All-Big 12 (2004)

Career NFL statistics
- Receptions: 5
- Receiving yards: 36
- Stats at Pro Football Reference

Terrence Cardene Murphy (born December 15, 1982) is a former Texas A&M and NFL wide receiver drafted in the 2nd round by the Green Bay Packers, turned real estate entrepreneur, venture capitalist and has completed over $4B+ in sales and acquisitions in his career.

Terrence founded an independent start-up real estate brokerage named TM5 Team and has brokered $2 Billion + in sales volume and has been involved in over 8,000 real estate transactions. TM5 merged with eXp Realty in 2021, where Terrence is a 3X ICON agent and his organization completed over $1.269B in total sales in 2023.

Terrence is a founder or investor in over 70+ companies under the Terrence Murphy Companies brand and has now moved into professional sports ownership. He is a real estate developer and home builder whose company Murphy Signature Homes recently won the Inc. 5000 award for one of America's fastest growing private owned companies. Terrence is on the board of Alumni Ventures, Texas A&M’s VC fund Ring Ventures.

== Early life ==
Terrence was born on December 15, 1982, and grew up outside of Tyler, TX in Chapel Hill.

Murphy attended Chapel Hill High School in Tyler, Texas, where he had a core GPA of 3.6. He also played quarterback and in his two years at quarterback, he passed for more than 2,500 yards, rushed for over 1,100 yards, and totaled over 25 touchdowns in combined seasons at Chapel Hill. He was the Offensive 16-4A District MVP in 2000 and signed with Texas A&M. He was the first and only Tyler Chapel Hill player to be drafted in the first two rounds of the NFL Draft.

== College career ==
Murphy attended Texas A&M University, where he became one of the best receivers in school history. He was two-time 1st Team All-Big 12 (wide receiver and kick returner) and was three-time Academic All-Big 12 in his four seasons at A&M. He switched to wide receiver and returned kickoffs after never playing either position before in his career. He was a team captain twice, in 2003 and 2004, and finished his career with a school record 172 receptions for 2,600 yards (15.1 yards per rec. avg.) and ten touchdowns, 17 rushing attempts for 209 yards (12.3 yards per rush avg.), and 31 kickoff returns for 761 yards (24.55 yards per kickoff ret. avg). He finished his career with 3,615 total all-purpose yards in four seasons, the most ever by an Aggie receiver. He was named to Sporting News All-American Team twice in his career, in 2001 and 2003. He is the Texas A&M record holder in the vertical jump (for all varsity sports including basketball) with a jump of 42 inches. He was named to the Texas A&M All-Decade Team. He played in two bowl games during his career, the 2001 Galleryfurniture.com Bowl and the 2005 Cotton Bowl Classic. He also was the first wide receiver to break 2,000 receiving yards in school history.

== Professional career ==
Murphy was selected in the second round (pick 58) of the 2005 NFL draft by the Green Bay Packers. He played in three games in the regular season, catching five passes for 36 yards. He was also a punt returner - having 5 returns with 91 yards. He was injured in October of his rookie year on a helmet-to-helmet hit from the Carolina Panthers' Thomas Davis during a kickoff return and subsequently placed on injured reserve. Murphy's teammate Najeh Davenport fumbled on the return, and when Murphy tried to retrieve the ball, he was hit hard by Davis. Tests later showed Murphy has spinal stenosis, a narrowing of the spine near the neck. As a result, the Packers released Murphy on April 20, 2006. On April 19, 2007, Murphy officially announced his retirement from the NFL.

== Coaching career ==
Murphy also served as a coaching intern for the Green Bay Packers.

== Personal life ==
Murphy is married to Erica Murphy, who is also a Realtor and co-owner of Terrence Murphy Companies. They have 3 children and are now living in Bryan, Texas.

After retiring from the NFL, Murphy relocated back to Bryan-College Station. He has started several businesses as well as the Terrence Murphy Camp, a 501c3 that focuses on faith, finance, and football. He is the CEO, Broker for TM5 Properties, a real estate company specializing in residential, land and investments in Brazos County, Texas. TM5 received the Aggie 100 award from Texas A&M University Mays Business School for being one of the fastest-growing Aggie-owned and Aggie-operated companies in the world in 2015, 2016 & 2018.
