= Todd Franz =

American football player (born 1976)

No. 22, 37, 49, 29, 43
- Position: Safety

Personal information
- Born: April 12, 1976 (age 50); Enid, Oklahoma, U.S.
- Listed height: 6 ft 0 in (1.83 m)
- Listed weight: 202 lb (92 kg)

Career information
- High school: Weatherford
- College: Tulsa
- NFL draft: 2000: 5th round, 145th overall pick

Career history
- Detroit Lions (2000)*; New Orleans Saints (2000); Cleveland Browns (2000); New York Jets (2001–2002)*; Green Bay Packers (2002); Washington Redskins (2002–2004); Green Bay Packers (2005)
- * Offseason or practice squad member only
- Stats at Pro Football Reference

Stephen Todd Franz (born April 12, 1976) is a former safety in the National Football League (NFL). He played professionally for the Cleveland Browns, New Orleans Saints, Green Bay Packers and Washington Redskins.

== Biography ==
Franz was born in Enid, Oklahoma and attended Weatherford High School. He played college football at the University of Tulsa. He earned a degree in accounting from the University of Tulsa.

He was drafted by the Detroit Lions in the fifth round (145th overall) of the 2000 NFL draft. Franz played in 46 games over a six-year career.

After leaving the NFL, Franz became a Real Estate Professional in the Oklahoma City Metro Area. He and his wife Tisha have two children and reside in Edmond, Oklahoma.
