= Darren Sharper =

American football player (born 1975)

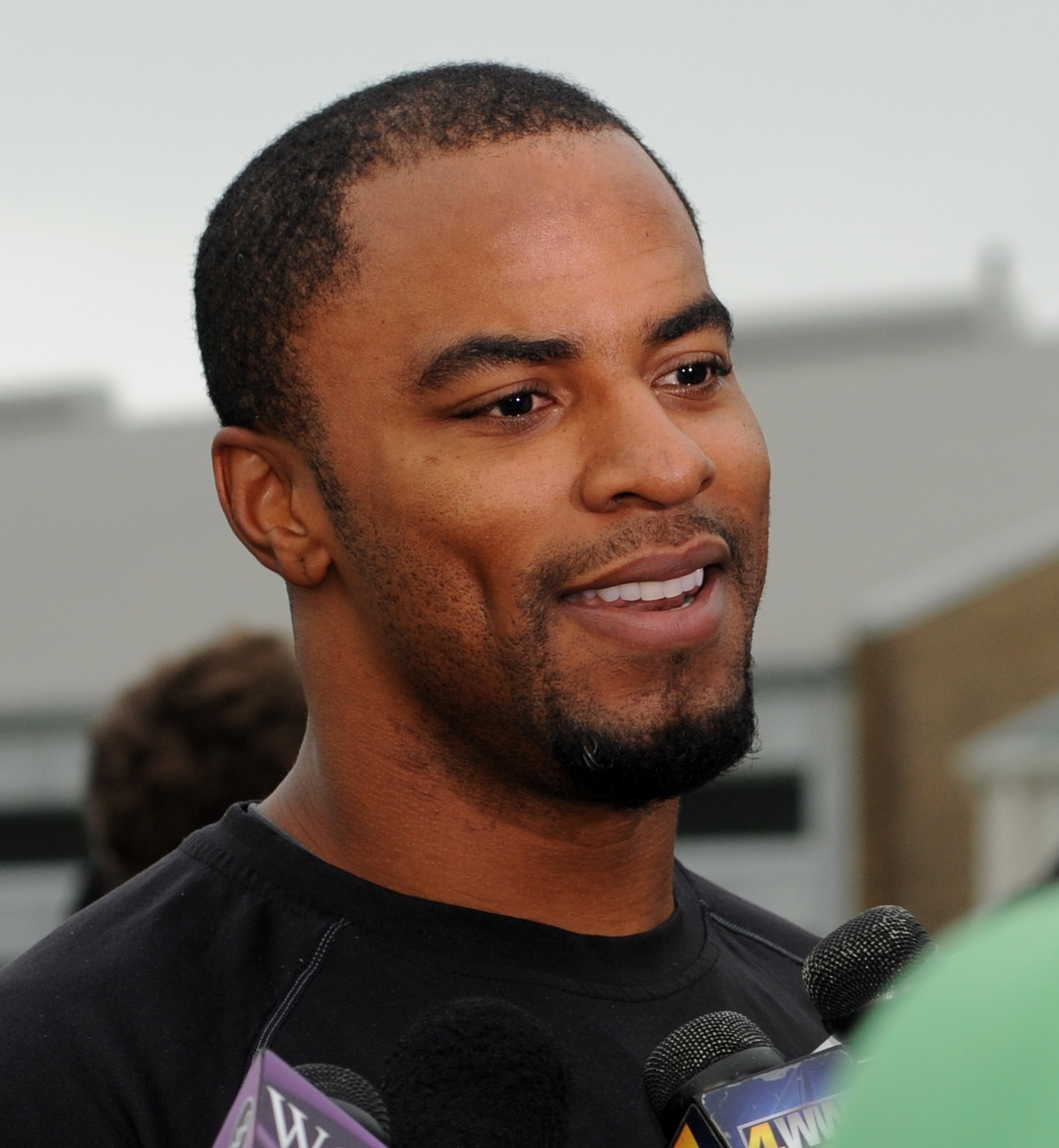
- Sharper in 2011

No. 42
- Position: Safety

Personal information
- Born: November 3, 1975 (age 51); Richmond, Virginia, U.S.
- Listed height: 6 ft 2 in (1.88 m)
- Listed weight: 210 lb (95 kg)

Career information
- High school: Hermitage (Henrico, Virginia)
- College: William & Mary (1993–1996)
- NFL draft: 1997: 2nd round, 60th overall pick

Career history
- Green Bay Packers (1997–2004); Minnesota Vikings (2005–2008); New Orleans Saints (2009–2010)

Awards and highlights
- Super Bowl champion (XLIV); 2× First-team All-Pro (2000, 2009); 4× Second-team All-Pro (2002, 2005, 2007, 2010); 5× Pro Bowl (2000, 2002, 2005, 2007, 2009); 2× NFL interceptions leader (2000, 2009); NFL 2000s All-Decade Team; NFL records: Most interception return yards in a season: 376 (2009); Most seasons leading league in interception return yards: 3 (2002, 2005, 2009)

Career NFL statistics
- Total tackles: 949
- Sacks: 7.5
- Forced fumbles: 8
- Pass deflections: 123
- Interceptions: 63
- Defensive touchdowns: 13
- Stats at Pro Football Reference

Darren Mallory Sharper (born November 3, 1975) is an American former professional football safety who played in the National Football League (NFL) for 14 seasons. He played college football for the William & Mary Tribe and was selected in the second round of the 1997 NFL draft by the Green Bay Packers, where he spent eight seasons. Sharper played his next four seasons with the Minnesota Vikings and his final two with the New Orleans Saints.

Recognized as one of the league's top defensive backs during his career, Sharper was a five-time Pro Bowl selection and a two-time first-team All-Pro, along with being named to the second-team of the 2000s All-Decade Team. He ranks sixth in interceptions and is tied with Charles Woodson and Rod Woodson for the most defensive touchdowns.

Following Sharper's 2010 retirement, allegations surfaced that he drugged and raped several women across various states, leading to him being charged in 2014. Sharper pleaded guilty to the rape and drug-related charges and was sentenced in 2016 to 20 years in prison. As a result of his guilty plea, he was removed from the College of William & Mary Athletics Hall of Fame. Although the conviction did not disqualify his Pro Football Hall of Fame eligibility, Sharper never progressed beyond nomination in the voting process.

== Early life ==
Sharper has an older sister, Monica, and an older brother, Jamie. The Sharpers attended Hermitage High School in Henrico County, Virginia. Jamie played for the high school football team as a linebacker. Darren played for the varsity football and basketball teams. He was named to the honor roll, had perfect attendance in three of his four years, and was active in the foreign language club and student council. Hermitage honored Sharper with a display on their "Wall of Fame". Sharper graduated from Hermitage in 1993. Following the rape allegations being substantiated, Hermitage removed all Sharper memorabilia from its school grounds.

== College career ==
Sharper attended the College of William and Mary, where he played for the William & Mary Tribe football team. In high school, Sharper primarily played quarterback. He wanted to be a quarterback at William & Mary, as well. The college coach, Jimmye Laycock, hinted to him that, as an alternative, Sharper might join the NFL (as a defensive back). During his college career, he earned All-America honors twice and was named first-team All-Yankee Conference selection three times. As a senior in 1996, he was the Yankee Conference Defensive Player of the Year after intercepting 10 passes for a season. He finished his college career with a school record 24 career interceptions and a I-AA record 468 career interception return yards. He also set the school record with 1,027 career punt return yards.

== Professional career ==
=== Pre-draft ===
Sharper participated at the annual NFL Scouting Combine, and completed all of the combine and positional drills. Although he performed well, his overall performance was mediocre compared others amongst his position group. NFL draft analysts and scouts projected Sharper to be selected in the third or fourth round of the 1997 NFL Draft. ESPN analyst Mel Kiper Jr. ranked Sharper as the second best safety prospect available in the draft, following Tremain Mack (Miami). Mel Kiper Jr. predicted the Packers would select Sharper in the third round in his mock draft.

Pre-draft measurables
Height	Weight	Arm length	Hand span	40-yard dash	10-yard split	20-yard split	20-yard shuttle	Three-cone drill	Vertical jump	Broad jump	Bench press
6 ft 1 3/4 in (1.87 m)	206 lb (93 kg)	31 7/8 in (0.81 m)	9 1/4 in (0.23 m)	4.64 s	1.61 s	2.73 s	4.24 s	6.97 s	39.0 in (0.99 m)	10 ft 1 in (3.07 m)	16 reps
All values from NFL Combine

=== Green Bay Packers ===
==== 1997 ====
The Green Bay Packers selected Sharper in the second round (60th overall) of the 1997 NFL draft. He was the fifth safety drafted and surpassed 1982 third round pick (83rd overall) John Cannon to become the highest drafted player from William & Mary since the common draft was established in 1967. His brother, Jamie Sharper, was also selected in the second round (34th overall) by the Baltimore Ravens.

On July 12, 1997, the Packers signed Sharper to a four—year, $1.82 million rookie contract that includes a signing bonus of $580,000.

He entered training camp following a brief contract dispute and was projected spend his rookie season as a backup safety and eventually replaced 34-year old Eugene Robinson who mentored him throughout the beginning of his career. Head coach Mike Holmgren named Sharper the primary backup safety to begin the season, behind starters Eugene Robinson and LeRoy Butler.

On September 1, 1997, Sharper made his professional regular season debut in the Green Bay Packers' home-opener against the Chicago Bears and recorded one solo tackle as they won 38–24. In Week 4, he set a season-high with three solo tackles as the Packers defeated the Minnesota Vikings 38–32. He was inactive for two games (Weeks 6–7) due to a knee injury. On November 2, 1997, Sharper made one solo tackle, a pass deflection, and returned the first interception of his career for a touchdown during a 20–10 loss to the Detroit Lions. During the second quarter, Sharper intercepted a pass Scott Mitchell threw to wide receiver Herman Moore and returned it 50–yards to score the first touchdown of his career. In Week 13, Sharper recorded two combined tackles (one solo) and scored his second touchdown of the season after he recovered a fumble by running back Sherman Williams and returned it for a 34–yard touchdown in the fourth quarter of a 45–17 win against the Dallas Cowboys. On December 20, 1997, Sharper made two combined tackles (one solo), a forced fumble, a pass deflection, and returned an interception for his third defensive touchdown of the season as the Packers defeated the Buffalo Bills 31–21. His third touchdown occurred on a pick-six after he intercepted a pass Alex Van Pelt threw to wide receiver Mitchell Galloway and returned it for a 20–yard touchdown to seal a victory in the fourth quarter. His third interception broke the franchise record for most defensive touchdowns by a rookie in a single season which stood for 64 years. He also tied Herb Adderley (1964) for the single season franchise record for defensive touchdowns. He finished his rookie season with 18 combined tackles (16 solo), two pass deflections, two interceptions, a forced fumble, a fumble recovery, and three touchdowns in 14 games without any starts.

The Green Bay Packers finished first in the NFC Central with a 13–3 record and earned a first round bye. On January 4, 1998, Sharper played in his first career playoff game and recorded four solo tackles and a pass deflection in the Packers' 21–7 victory against the Tampa Bay Buccaneers in the NFC Divisional Round. The Packers reached Super Bowl XXXII after they defeated the San Francisco 49ers 23–10 in the NFC Championship Game. On January 25, 1998, Sharper appeared in Super Bowl XXXII as the Packers lost to the Denver Broncos 31–24 and failed to repeat as Super Bowl Champions.

==== 1998 ====
He entered training camp slated as the starting free safety under defensive coordinator Fritz Shurmur following the departure of Eugene Robinson. Head coach Mike Holmgren officially named Sharper the starting free safety to begin the regular season, alongside strong safety LeRoy Butler.

On September 6, 1998, Sharper earned his first career start in the Green Bay Packers' season-opener against the Detroit Lions and made three combined tackles (two solo) and two pass deflections in their 38–19 victory. In Week 7, he set a season-high with ten combined tackles (five solo) during a 27–20 loss at the Detroit Lions. In Week 15, he recorded seven solo tackles and set a season-high with three pass deflections as the Packers defeated the Chicago Bears 26–20. He started in all 16 games in 1998 and recorded 73 combined tackles (53 solo) and nine pass deflections.

The Green Bay Packers finished the 1998 season second in the NFC Central with an 11–5 record and earned a playoff berth. On January 3, 1999, Sharper started his first career playoff game and recorded five combined tackles (four solo), deflected a pass, made a sack, forced a fumble, and intercepted a pass Steve Young threw to wide receiver J. J. Stokes during a 27–30 loss at the San Francisco 49ers in the NFC Wildcard Game.

==== 1999 ====
On January 8, 1999, head coach Mike Holmgren accepted the general manager/head coaching position with the Seattle Seahawks. On January 12, 1999, the Green Bay Packers hired Ray Rhodes as the new head coach. Defensive coordinator Emmitt Thomas retained Sharper and LeRoy Butler as the starting safeties to start the regular season.

On October 10, 1999, Sharper made seven combined tackles (four solo), a pass deflection, and secured a 26–23 victory against the Tampa Bay Buccaneers by intercepting a pass Trent Dilfer threw to wide receiver Reidel Anthony with 23 seconds remaining in the fourth quarter. In Week 9, he set a recorded 11 combined tackles (10 solo), set a season-high with two pass deflections, and intercepted a pass Jim Miller threw to wide receiver Marcus Robinson during a 14–13 loss to the Chicago Bears. On November 14, 1999, Sharper recorded 11 combined tackles (10 solo) and made his first career sack on quarterback Jason Garrett during a 27–13 loss at the Dallas Cowboys. On December 26, 1999, Sharper collected a season-high 12 combined tackles (eight solo) during a 29–10 loss at the Tampa Bay Buccaneers in Week 16. He started in all 16 games for the second consecutive season and finished the 1999 season with a career-high 113 combined tackles (86 solo), five pass deflections, and three interceptions.

==== 2000 ====
On January 2, 2000, the Green Bay Packers fired head coach Ray Rhodes after they finished with an 8–8 record. On January 17, 2000, the Green Bay Packers hired Mike Sherman as their new general manager/head coach. Defensive coordinator Ed Donatell named Sharper and LeRoy Butler as the starting safeties to begin the season.

On September 3, 2000, Sharper started in the Green Bay Packers' home-opener against the New York Jets and made eight combined tackles (seven solo), one pass deflection, and intercepted a pass Vinny Testaverde threw to Wayne Chrebet as they lost 16–20. In Week 4, Sharper set a season-high with ten combined tackles (seven solo), four pass deflections, and intercepted two passes by Jake Plummer during a 29–3 victory at the Arizona Cardinals. In Week 10, he recorded seven combined tackles (six solo) and intercepted two pass attempts by Daunte Culpepper during a 26–20 win against the Minnesota Vikings. In Week 16, he made three solo tackles, a pass deflection, and set a career-high with his ninth interception of the season on a pass Daunte Culpeper threw to Cris Carter during a 33–28 victory at the Minnesota Vikings. On December 14, 2000, it was announced that Sharper was selected for the 2001 Pro Bowl, marking the first Pro Bowl selection of his career. He started in all 16 games in 2000 and recorded 92 combined tackles (72 solo), 17 pass deflections, one sack, and led the entire league with nine interceptions.

==== 2001 ====
On February 21, 2001, the Green Bay Packers signed Sharper to a six—year, $30 million contract that includes a signing bonus of $7 million.

Head coach Mike Sherman retained Sharper and LeRoy Butler as the starting safety duo in 2001. He started in the Green Bay Packers' season-opener against the Detroit Lions and recorded four solo tackles, deflected two passes, and intercepted two passes by quarterback Charlie Batch in their 28–6 victory. On October 4, 2001, he made ten combined tackles (eight solo), two pass deflections, and an interception in 31–23 win against the Baltimore Ravens in Week 5. In Week 14, Sharper collected a season-high ten combined tackles (nine solo) during a 26–20 loss at the Tennessee Titans. Sharper started in all 16 games in 2001 and recorded 94 combined tackles (70 solo), 17 pass deflections, six interceptions, two sacks, and a forced fumble.

The Green Bay Packers finished second in the NFC Central with a 12–4 record. On January 13, 2002, Sharper made nine combined tackles, deflected a pass, and made a sack in a 25–15 win against the San Francisco 49ers in the NFC Wildcard Game. The following week, he made seven combined tackles, a pass deflection, and intercepted a pass by quarterback Kurt Warner during a 45–17 loss at the St. Louis Rams in the NFC Divisional Round.

==== 2002 ====
Head coach Mike Sherman named Sharper the starting free safety to begin the regular season, alongside strong safety Marques Anderson. This became Sharpers' first season without LeRoy Butler who retired due to a shoulder injury. Sharper was inactive for two games (Weeks 6–7) due to a hamstring injury. On November 4, 2002, Sharper recorded seven combined tackles, deflected two passes, and returned an interception for a touchdown as the Packers defeated the Miami Dolphins 24–10 in Week 7. Sharper intercepted a pass by Dolphins' quarterback Ray Lucas and returned it for an 89-yard touchdown in the third quarter. In Week 15, he collected a season-high eight combined tackles during a 20–14 win at the San Francisco 49ers. He was sidelined during the Packers' Week 17 loss at the New York Jets after injuring his hamstring the previous week. On December 19, 2002, Sharper was announced as a 2003 Pro Bowl selection. He finished the 2002 season with 68 combined tackles (51 solo), seven interceptions, two pass deflections, and a touchdown in 13 games and 13 starts.

==== 2003 ====
Sharper returned as the starting free safety in his fourth year under defensive coordinator Ed Donatell. He was paired with strong safety Antuan Edwards and played alongside cornerbacks Al Harris and Mike McKenzie. On September 21, 2003, he collected a season-high nine combined tackles during the Packers' 20–13 loss at the Arizona Cardinals in Week 3. The following week, he recorded six solo tackles and made a career-high two sacks on Bears' quarterback Kordell Stewart in a 38–23 win at the Chicago Bears in Week 4. In Week 15, he tied his season-high of nine combined tackles, deflected a pass, and returned an interception by quarterback Drew Brees for a 50-yard gain during a 38–21 win at the San Diego Chargers. Sharper finished the 2003 season with 82 combined tackles (69 solo), 13 pass deflections, five interceptions, two sacks, and two forced fumbles in 15 games and 15 starts.

The Green Bay Packers finished first in the NFC North with a 10–6 record. On January 4, 2004, Sharper recorded 11 combined tackles (nine solo) in the Packers' 33–27 overtime victory in the NFC Wildcard Game against the Seattle Seahawks and led by his former head coach Mike Holmgren. The following week, he made eight combined tackles, deflected two passes, and recorded a sack during a 20–17 overtime loss at the Philadelphia Eagles in the NFC Divisional Round.

==== 2004 ====
On January 16, 2004, head coach Mike Sherman announced the dismissal of defensive coordinator Ed Donatell after the Packers' defense ranked 17th in 2003 and allowed the Philadelphia Eagles to convert on fourth and 26th in the NFC Divisional Round. Sherman elected to promote defensive backs coach Bob Slowik to defensive coordinator. Sharper was retained as the starting free safety in 2003, but was paired with strong safety Mark Roman.

On September 26, 2004, Sharper collected a season-high nine combined tackles in a 45–31 loss at the Indianapolis Colts in Week 3. On October 17, 2004, he made four combined tackles, broke up a pass, and returned an interception for a touchdown during a 38–10 victory at the Detroit Lions. Sharper intercepted a pass by Lions' quarterback Joey Harrington and returned it for a 36-yard touchdown in the third quarter. Sharper was inactive for the Packers' Week 8 victory at the Washington Redskins due to an injury to his shin. In Week 15, he recorded six combined tackles and returned a fumble recovery for a 15-yard touchdown in the second quarter of a 28–25 loss to the Jacksonville Jaguars in Week 15. In Week 17, Sharper recorded five combined tackles, deflected a pass, and returned an interception by Chad Hutchinson for a 43-yard touchdown in the second quarter of the Packers' 31–14 win at the Chicago Bears. He finished the 2004 season with 70 combined tackles (57 solo), seven pass deflections, four interceptions, three interceptions, two forced fumbles, and a fumble recovery. He tied the franchise record of three defensive touchdowns he set in his rookie season in 1997.

On January 24, 2005, the Packers replaced defensive coordinator Bob Slowik with Jim Bates. On March 10, 2005, the Green Bay Packers released Sharper after he declined to take a pay cut. The Packers avoided paying him a $2.60 million roster bonus and cleared $3.40 million in salary cap space by releasing him. He finished his eight-year career in Green Bay ranked fifth with 36 interceptions. He also recorded 616 combined tackles, six sacks, 677 interception return yards, and 7 defensive touchdowns.

=== Minnesota Vikings ===
==== 2005 ====
On March 12, 2005, the Minnesota Vikings signed Sharper to a four—year, $14.20 million contract that includes $4.90 million guaranteed and a signing bonus of $1.00 million.

Sharper entered training camp slated as the starting free safety. Head coach Mike Tice officially named Sharper the starter to begin the regular season, along with strong safety Corey Chavous and cornerbacks Fred Smoot and Brian Williams.

He started in the Minnesota Vikings' season-opener against the Tampa Bay Buccaneers and collected a season-high nine combined tackles, deflected two passes, forces a fumble, and returned an interception for a touchdown during a 24–13 loss. Sharper intercepted a pass by quarterback Brian Griese and returned it for an 88-yard touchdown in the first quarter. He was sidelined for two games (Weeks 3–4) after injuring his quadriceps. On November 13, 2005, Sharper recorded four combined tackles, deflected five passes, made a career-high three interceptions, and returned an interception for a touchdown during a 24–21 win at the New York Giants in Week 10. Sharper intercepted a pass by Giants' quarterback Eli Manning and returned it for a 92-yard touchdown in the first quarter. On December 20, 2005, it was announced that Sharper was selected to the 2006 Pro Bowl. He finished his first season with the Minnesota Vikings with a total of 51 combined tackles (41 solo), 16 pass deflections, tied his career-high of nine interceptions, forced a fumble, and scored two touchdowns in 14 games and 14 starts.

==== 2006 ====
On January 2, 2006, the Minnesota Vikings fired head coach Mike Tice after they finished with a 9–7 record in 2005. On January 6, 2006, the Minnesota Vikings announced the hiring of former Philadelphia Eagles' offensive coordinator Brad Childress as their new head coach. Defensive coordinator Mike Tomlin installed the Tampa 2 defense and chose to move Sharper to strong safety. Head coach Brad Childress named Shaper the starting strong safety to begin the regular season, alongside free safety Tank Williams. Dwight Smith replaced Williams to begin the regular season due to an injury.

In Week 8, he collected a season-high seven solo tackles, deflected a pass, and made an interception during a 31–7 loss to the New England Patriots. On November 11, 2006, in a game against the Miami Dolphins, Sharper bumped a member of the officiating crew, but he was not immediately penalized, later the following week the NFL fined him $15,000 for the infraction. On December 17, 2006, he collected a season-high eight combined tackles during a 26–13 loss to the New York Jets in Week 15. He started in all 16 games in 2006 and recorded 67 combined tackles (55 solo), nine pass deflections, four interceptions, and a sack.

==== 2007 ====
On February 8, 2007, the Minnesota Vikings hired Indianapolis Colts' defensive backs coach Leslie Frazier to be the new defensive coordinator after Mike Tomlin accepted the head coaching position with the Pittsburgh Steelers. Frazier opted to run the Tampa 2 defense and retained Sharper and Dwight as the starting safeties in 2007.

On September 16, 2007, Sharper collected a season-high eight solo tackles, deflected two passes, and made two interceptions during a 20–17 overtime loss at the Detroit Lions in Week 2. His two interceptions brought his career total to 50 and earned him the distinction as the 22nd player to surpass 50 interceptions. In Week 12, he made two solo tackles, broke up a pass, and returned an interception for a touchdown in the Vikings' 41–17 win at the New York Giants. Sharper intercepted a pass by quarterback Eli Manning and returned it for a 20-yard touchdown in the first quarter. On December 18, 2007, Sharper was announced as a 2008 Pro Bowl selection. He started in all 16 games in 2007 and recorded 63 combined tackles (49 solo), eight pass deflections, four interceptions, and a forced fumble.

==== 2008 ====
Head coach Brad Childress named Sharper the starting strong safety to begin the 2008 season, alongside free safety Madieu Williams. In Week 14, he collected a season-high eight solo tackles during a 20–16 win at the Detroit Lions. Sharper started in all 16 games for the third consecutive season and recorded 69 combined tackles (60 solo), five pass deflections, and an interception. He finished his four-year career in Minnesota with 18 interceptions, 250 tackles, 359 interception yards, three touchdowns, and a sack.

=== New Orleans Saints ===
==== 2009 ====
On March 18, 2009, the New Orleans Saints signed Sharper to a one—year, $1.70 million contract that includes a signing bonus of $200,000. Throughout training camp, Sharper competed to be the starting free safety against Usama Young. Head coach Sean Payton named Sharper the starting free safety to begin regular season, alongside strong safety Roman Harper and cornerbacks Jabari Greer and Tracy Porter.

He started in the New Orleans Saints' season-opener against the Detroit Lions and recorded one tackle, deflected two passes, and made two interceptions off pass attempts by quarterback Matthew Stafford during a 45–27 victory. The following week, Sharper recorded three solo tackles, broke up a pass, and returned an interception by quarterback Kevin Kolb for a 97-yard touchdown during the fourth quarter of a 48–22 win at the Philadelphia Eagles in Week 2. On October 4, 2009, Sharper made nine combined tackles, two pass deflections, two interceptions, and a touchdown during a 24–10 win against the New York Jets in Week 4. Sharper intercepted a pass by Jets' quarterback Mark Sanchez and returned it for a 99-yard touchdown in the second quarter. The return for touchdown became his second 95+ yard interception return of the season. In Week 7, Sharper made four combined tackles, broke up a pass, and returned an interception by Chad Henne for a 42-yard touchdown during a 46–34 win at the Miami Dolphins. Sharper was inactive for the Saints' Week 10 victory at the St. Louis Rams after straining his left knee. On December 27, 2009, Sharper made seven combined tackles, two pass deflections, and returned an interception by Josh Freeman for a 21-yard gain during a 20–17 loss to the Tampa Bay Buccaneers in Week 16. The 21-yard interception brought his season return yards to 376-yards and earned him the record for most interception return yards in a single season. He surpassed Ed Reed who set the record in 2004. It was the 63rd interception of Sharper's NFL career, tying him for sixth on the all-time list. On December 29, 2009, it was announced that Sharper was selected to play in the 2010 Pro Bowl. Sharper finished the season with 71 combined tackles (51 solo), 15 pass deflections, nine interceptions, three touchdowns, and was credited with half a sack in 14 games and 14 starts.

The New Orleans Saints finished first in the NFC South with a 13–3 record and earned a first round bye. They defeated the Arizona Cardinals 45–14 in the NFC Divisional Round. On January 24, 2010, Sharper recorded 11 combined tackles (seven solo) as the Saints defeated the Minnesota Vikings 31–28 in the NFC Championship Game. On February 7, 2010, Sharper started in Super Bowl XLIV and made three combined tackles during a 31–17 victory against the Indianapolis Colts. The game was decided when cornerback Tracy Porter intercepted a Peyton Manning pass late in the fourth quarter and returned it 74-yards for the game-winning touchdown.

==== 2010 ====
During the offseason, Shaper underwent micro-fracture arthroscopic surgery on his left knee. On March 5, 2010, Sharper became an unrestricted free agent and went on a visit with the Jacksonville Jaguars. On May 3, 2010, the New Orleans Saints signed Sharper to a one-year, $2.25 million contract with a signing bonus of $75,000. Throughout training camp, Sharper competed to retain his position as the starting free safety against Malcolm Jenkins who was converted from cornerback.

On September 3, Sharper was placed on the physically unable to perform (PUP) list, causing him to miss the first six weeks of the 2010 NFL season. He was activated on October 24, but he later missed another two games after a further injury. Sharper finished the 2010 season with 16 combined tackles (11 solo) and a pass deflection in eight games and one start. He was selected as a second-team All Pro, despite having missed much of the season.

=== Retirement ===
After workouts with the Denver Broncos, New England Patriots, and Green Bay Packers without a contract offer, Sharper announced his retirement after a 14-year career. He finished with 63 career regular season interceptions, placing him sixth all time. He took 11 of them back for touchdowns, which ranks him tied for second with Charles Woodson and only behind Hall of Famer Rod Woodson, with 12. Sharper's 13 career defensive touchdowns (11 interception returns, two fumble returns) is tied for first in NFL history with both Woodsons.

=== Hall of Fame consideration ===
On April 13, 2015, Sharper was removed from the William & Mary Athletics Hall of Fame.

In 2016, he became eligible for induction into the Pro Football Hall of Fame, leading to a debate as to whether his criminal convictions disqualify him. Sports Illustrated writer Peter King, who is on the Hall of Fame voting committee, has said that Sharper must be considered because voters are prohibited from taking off-field issues into account. While Sharper was nominated for the Hall of Fame, he never progressed beyond nomination in the voting process.

== Post-playing career ==
In August 2012, after retiring, Sharper worked briefly for WWL-TV as an analyst before leaving to take a position with NFL Network. On February 28, 2014, Sharper was officially fired from NFL Network in connection with his arrest for aggravated rape.

== NFL career statistics ==
Legend
	Won the Super Bowl
	NFL record
	Led the league
**Bold**	Career high

=== Regular season ===
Year	Team	GP	Tackles				Interceptions						Fumbles			
Year	Team	GP	Cmb	Solo	Ast	Sck	PD	Int	Yds	Avg	Lng	TD	FF	FR	Yds	TD
1997	GB	14	13	11	2	0.0	2	2	70	35.0	50	2	1	1	**34**	**1**
1998	GB	16	73	53	20	0.0	9	0	0	0.0	0	0	0	0	0	0
1999	GB	16	**113**	**84**	**29**	1.0	6	3	12	4.0	9	0	0	1	9	0
2000	GB	16	92	72	20	1.0	**17**	**9**	109	12.1	47	0	0	0	0	0
2001	GB	16	94	70	24	**2.0**	**17**	6	78	13.0	23	0	1	1	17	0
2002	GB	13	68	51	17	0.0	9	7	233	33.3	89	1	0	0	0	0
2003	GB	15	82	69	13	**2.0**	13	5	78	15.3	50	0	**2**	0	0	0
2004	GB	15	70	57	13	0.0	7	4	97	24.2	43	2	**2**	1	15	**1**
2005	MIN	14	51	41	10	0.0	16	**9**	276	30.7	92	2	1	1	14	0
2006	MIN	16	68	52	16	1.0	9	4	10	2.5	10	0	1	0	0	0
2007	MIN	16	63	49	14	0.0	8	4	61	15.2	41	1	1	0	0	0
2008	MIN	16	69	60	9	0.0	5	1	12	12.0	12	0	0	**2**	20	0
2009	NO	14	71	51	20	0.5	15	**9**	**376**	**41.8**	**99**	**3**	0	0	0	0
2010	NO	8	16	11	5	0.0	1	0	0	0.0	0	0	0	1	11	0
Career		205	943	731	212	7.5	134	63	1,412	22.4	99	11	9	8	120	2

== Convictions of rape and drug distribution ==
=== Allegations ===
- On March 18, 2011, two women filed a criminal complaint against Sharper with the Miami Beach Police Department alleging they were possibly sexually assaulted after passing out at Sharper's condo on his couch and waking up to find their underwear missing. The women were in Miami for spring break and were students from the University of Georgia. On March 17, 2011, the women had been brought to Sharper's condo by a mutual friend, nightclub promoter Wascar Payano, and had passed out on Sharper's couch. One of the women claimed she woke up to a man attempting to place his penis in her mouth, but pushed the man away. She stated that when she woke up again a man was lifting her dress. She immediately woke up her friend and told Payano about the incident. Both women discovered their underwear was missing and were taken to the hospital by Payano where they underwent rape examination. On March 23, 2011, Miami Beach Police Department closed the investigation five days after the incident. The Miami Beach Police Department's records show no evidence the detective in charge of the case sent the rape kits for a detailed examination, had spoken to Darren Sharper, or had visited Sharper's condo where the accuser said the assault had taken place.
- On February 2, 2013, Sharper was accused of helping drug a woman who was working as a model at a pre-Super Bowl party in New Orleans and was consequently raped by Sharper's friend Brandon Licciardi.
- On August 31, 2013, Sharper was accused of raping a woman in New Orleans.
- On September 23, 2013, Sharper was accused of drugging two women in New Orleans. One of the victims filed a report with the New Orleans Police Department. Sharper and his friend, Erik Nunez, raped the women.
- On October 30, 2013, Sharper was accused of drugging two women and raped one of the women in Los Angeles after meeting them in a West Hollywood night club and bringing them back to his hotel room. On November 7, 2013, the victim filed a police report with the Los Angeles Police Department.
- On November 20, 2013, Sharper, after meeting three female Arizona State University students in Tempe, Arizona, was accused of raping two of them after drugging them. Both women immediately underwent assault examinations within 12 hours of the assault and filed a police report with the Tempe Police Department.
- On January 14, 2014, Sharper, after meeting two women in West Hollywood night clubs and taking them to his hotel room, was accused of drugging them and raping one of them. Both victims reported the incident to the Los Angeles Police Department and underwent rape examinations.
- On January 15, 2014, after meeting two women and a man in a nightclub in Las Vegas, Sharper was accused of drugging all three, before taking the women to his hotel room and sexually assaulting both of them.

=== Prosecutions ===
==== California state ====
On January 17, 2014, Sharper was arrested in Los Angeles on two separate counts of sexual assault. The incidents were said to have happened in October 2013 and January 2014.

On February 14, 2014, Sharper was officially charged with two counts of rape, by use of drugs, and five related felony counts. Sharper was released on $200,000 bond, which at the request of the prosecution was raised to $1,000,000. Sharper pleaded not guilty to the charges. Conditions of his bail required him not to frequent any drinking establishment, as well as not to be alone with any women he had no relationship with prior to October 13, 2013, the date of his first alleged rape described in the indictment. Sharper faced up to 30 years in prison if convicted of all counts.

==== Louisiana state and federal ====
In January 2014, USA Today reported the New Orleans Police Department was investigating a sexual assault allegation against Sharper which was filed on September 24, 2013.

Officials in Orleans Parish, Louisiana, filed two charges of aggravated rape against Sharper and another two counts against Erik Nunez, 26, on February 27, 2014, related to the alleged September 2013 incident in New Orleans. Investigators said a second woman came forward with a complaint following an initial report shortly after the alleged rape. WDSU noted, "Louisiana law states that a person convicted of committing aggravated rape shall be punished by life imprisonment at hard labor without benefit of parole, probation or suspension of sentence." Also on February 27, 2014, Sharper surrendered to the police in Los Angeles after an arrest warrant was issued by the authorities in Louisiana.

On December 12, 2014, an Orleans Parish grand jury indicted Sharper on two counts of aggravated rape, stating that, if convicted, he will face a mandatory life sentence. On the same day, a federal grand jury in the US District Court for the Eastern District of Louisiana returned an indictment for conspiracy to distribute a controlled substance (1 count) and distribution of a controlled substance (2 counts).

==== Arizona state ====
On March 12, 2014, Sharper was charged with sexual assault in Arizona. Under Arizona state law, a person commits sexual assault by knowingly engaging in sexual intercourse or oral sexual contact with another person without that person's consent. No consent was given if the victim was incapable of consenting by reason of drugs, alcohol, sleep, or a similar impairment, and such impairment was known or should have been known to the defendant.

==== Nevada state ====
On March 20, 2015, Sharper was charged with two sexual assaults in Las Vegas. The purported crimes took place in January 2014 and involved two women. Nevada state legislation provides that a person subjecting another person to sexual penetration against that person's will, or under conditions in which the perpetrator knows or should know that the victim is mentally or physically incapable of resisting or understanding the nature of the perpetrator's conduct, is guilty of sexual assault. The notion of sexual penetration includes sexual intercourse in its ordinary meaning.

=== Guilty pleas and sentencing ===
==== California and Arizona ====
Later on March 20, Sharper's lawyer said that Sharper had reached a plea agreement to resolve all of the charges against him. He appeared in court in Los Angeles on March 23 to enter guilty pleas to sexual assault in Arizona, by video-conferencing, and no contest in California to raping two women he knocked out with a potent sedative mixed with alcohol. The Arizona judge sentenced him immediately to nine years in prison, with no chance for early release.

On November 29, 2016, Sharper was sentenced to 20 years in prison by Los Angeles County Superior Court Judge Michael Pastor. Sharper's plea deal allows serving half that time, minus time already served. As a non-violent criminal, Sharper might also be eligible for parole since raping an intoxicated person is a non-violent crime in the state of California.

==== Nevada ====
On March 24, 2015, Sharper pleaded guilty to a single count of attempted sexual assault on two women in Las Vegas. He agreed to serve three to eight years for this crime. He was formally sentenced on October 27, 2016.

==== Louisiana and federal ====
On May 29, 2015, Sharper pleaded guilty, in federal court, to conspiracy to distribute alprazolam (Xanax), diazepam (Valium) and zolpidem (Ambien) with intent to commit rape and two counts of distributing these substances with intent to commit rape. He accepted a nine-year sentence in a plea deal for all charges against him. However, on February 18, 2016, U.S. District Judge Jane Triche-Milazzo rejected the deal saying, "This court cannot accept this plea agreement", and noted that a federal pre-sentence report called for a range of 15–20 years. On March 22, 2016, judge Triche-Milazzo approved a new deal under which the proposed length of imprisonment fits the above range.

On August 18, 2016, Sharper was sentenced to 220 months (18 years and 4 months) of incarceration, followed by 3 years of supervised release, and a $20,000 fine. The following week, he was sentenced by a Louisiana State judge to 20 years in prison, stemming from three counts of rape.

All imprisonments will run concurrently. Time served will count towards every charge in every state as if running all at the same time. Once out of prison, Sharper must register as a sex offender and comply with a "sex treatment condition", as part of the 3-year supervision program. Court records list the total of 9 victims involved, nationwide. But, according to the judge, there may be as many as 16.

=== Incarceration ===
Sharper was imprisoned in FCI Elkton. He is scheduled to be released in late 2028. On June 9, 2026, Sharper was transferred to a halfway house near Elkton, Ohio.

=== Co-defendants ===
Two accomplices — Brandon Licciardi of Meraux, Louisiana, and Erik Nunez of New Orleans — pleaded guilty in connection with the alleged drug-and-rape plot. Licciardi is a former sheriff's deputy in the New Orleans suburb of St. Bernard Parish. He had been on the force since 2002, but resigned after charges were filed.

On February 27, 2014, Nunez was arrested and charged, in state court, with two counts of aggravated rape purportedly taking place September 23, 2013, at Sharper's residence in New Orleans. Additionally, he was charged with obstruction of justice between September 23, 2013, and February 28, 2014.

On December 12, 2014, Licciardi was indicted by a federal grand jury on six criminal counts including tampering with a witness (2 counts), impeding an investigation, conspiracy to distribute a controlled substance, and distribution of a controlled substance (2 counts).

On February 6, 2015, Licciardi pleaded innocent to state charges against him, including aggravated rape on February 2, 2013, and three counts of human trafficking to facilitate sexual conduct. Additionally, he was charged with battery using a dangerous weapon.

On July 24, 2015, Nunez was federally charged with conspiracy to impede an investigation. On July 11, 2016, in exchange for a 10-year sentence, he pleaded guilty, before judge Triche-Milazzo, to conspiracy to distribute controlled substances without victim's knowledge and with the intent to commit a sexual battery, to which he entered two separate guilty pleas in a state court of Louisiana. Under Louisiana state law, sexual battery includes touching of the victim's private body parts while the victim is incapable of understanding the nature of the act, and this inability is, or should have been, known to the defendant.

On July 15, 2016, Licciardi pleaded guilty, before the same judge, to conspiracy to distribute controlled substances with the intent to commit crimes of violence, including rape. In state court, he pleaded guilty to three counts of human trafficking and one count of forcible rape. He agreed to a 17-year prison sentence.

On October 20, 2016, both men were formally sentenced by the federal court. On October 27, they were sentenced on Louisiana state charges. Criminal District Judge Karen Herman ordered that each defendant's prison term mirror and run concurrently with his federal sentence.

=== Analysis ===
Since February 27, 2014 – Sharper's last day at liberty – the lingering question was how he managed to hurt at least nine women over many months and still avoid incarceration despite investigation being already underway.

A criminal justice official speculated that the answer may lie in the perpetrator's high social and financial status affording him well-qualified lawyers prosecutors hesitated to confront. "If his name was John Brown, he would have been in jail", the official said. "If a woman says, 'He's the guy that raped me,' and you have corroborating evidence to show they were together and she went to the hospital and she can identify him, that guy goes to jail".

Another official elaborated: "The D.A.'s position and the administration's position was, because this was a high-profile case, we want to make sure we do this the right way. It was mainly because of the celebrity-ness".

Over time, Sharper's actions became more and more sophisticated. He did not make self-incriminating statements. He traveled often. His criminal activity spanned four states, making it hard to detect. Prescription sedatives mixed with alcohol made the victims unconscious and unable to remember, undermining their credibility with the police.

=== Further proceedings ===
In July 2019, Sharper filed a motion to undo his 2016 plea deal arguing that he was not adequately advised by his previous lawyers on the consequences of his guilty plea. However, the judge dismissed his motion citing that Sharper had twice admitted in open court that he understood the terms of his plea agreement.
