= Donnell Washington =

American football player (born 1981)

Profile
- Position: Defensive tackle

Personal information
- Born: February 6, 1981 (age 45); Beaufort, South Carolina, U.S.
- Listed height: 6 ft 6 in (1.98 m)
- Listed weight: 330 lb (150 kg)

Career information
- College: Clemson
- NFL draft: 2004: 3rd round, 72nd overall pick

Career history
- Green Bay Packers (2004–2005); Oakland Raiders (2006)

Awards and highlights
- Second-team All-ACC (2003)

Donnell Washington (born February 6, 1981) is an American former professional football defensive tackle. He was born in Beaufort, South Carolina.

== College career ==
Washington played college football at Clemson University but forwent his senior season to enter the NFL draft.

== Professional career ==
Washington was drafted by the Green Bay Packers in the 2004 NFL draft but missed his rookie season due to a foot injury. The following season, he was inactive for 15 of 16 games. He was released by the club in June 2006 without having appeared in any regular season games. The same month, he was signed as a free agent with the Oakland Raiders. He was cut by the Raiders in September the same year.
