= 2005 Miami Dolphins season =

40th season in franchise history

- Owner: Wayne Huizenga
- General manager: Randy Mueller
- Head coach: Nick Saban
- Home stadium: Dolphins Stadium

Results
- Record: 9–7
- Division place: 2nd AFC East
- Playoffs: Did not qualify
- Pro Bowlers: WR Chris Chambers; DE Jason Taylor; LB Zach Thomas

The 2005 Miami Dolphins season was the franchise’s 40th overall, the 36th as a member of the National Football League. The Dolphins managed to improve upon their previous season’s output of 4–12, posting a winning record of 9–7. They finished the season on a six-game win streak, being eliminated from playoff contention by week 15 after the Chargers and Steelers won, and ended their season with an upset over the defending back-to-back Super Bowl champion New England Patriots, the Dolphins' second straight year beating them as defending champions.

== Offseason ==
=== NFL draft ===
2005 Miami Dolphins draft
Round	Pick	Player	Position	College	Notes
1	2	Ronnie Brown *	Running back	Auburn	
2	46	Matt Roth	Defensive end	Iowa	
3	70	Channing Crowder	Linebacker	Florida	
4	104	Travis Daniels	Cornerback	LSU	
5	162	Anthony Alabi	Offensive tackle	TCU	
7	216	Kevin Vickerson	Defensive tackle	Michigan State	
Made roster † Pro Football Hall of Fame * Made at least one Pro Bowl during career

=== NFL supplemental draft ===
2005 Miami Dolphins draft
Round	Pick	Player	Position	College	Notes
5	—	Manuel Wright	Defensive tackle	USC	Replaced 5th round pick of the 2006 draft
Made roster † Pro Football Hall of Fame * Made at least one Pro Bowl during career

=== Notable undrafted free agent ===
2005 Miami Dolphins draft
Round	Pick	Player	Position	College	Notes
—	—	John Denney *	Long snapper	BYU	
Made roster † Pro Football Hall of Fame * Made at least one Pro Bowl during career

== Staff ==
2005 Miami Dolphins staff
Front office: Owner/chairman of the board – Wayne Huizenga; Chief executive officer – Joe Bailey; Executive vice president/chief operating officer – Bryan Wiedmeier; General manager – Randy Mueller; Head coaches: Head coach – Nick Saban; Assistant head coach/offense/wide receivers – Charlie Baggett; Assistant head coach/defense – Will Muschamp; Offensive coaches: Offensive coordinator – Scott Linehan; Quarterbacks – Jason Garrett; Running backs – Bobby Williams; Tight ends – Derek Dooley; Offensive line – Hudson Houck; Assistant offensive line – Tim Davis; Offensive quality control – Judd Garrett; Offensive assistant – James Coley	Defensive coaches: Defensive coordinator – Richard Smith; Defensive line – Dan Quinn; Assistant defensive line – Travis Jones; Linebackers – George Edwards; Secondary – Mel Phillips; Defensive quality control – Glenn Pires; Special teams coaches: Special teams – Keith Armstrong; Special teams assistant – Dameyune Craig; Strength and conditioning: Strength and conditioning – John Gamble; Associate strength and conditioning – Bert Hill; Assistant strength and conditioning – Eric Fears

== Roster ==
2005 Miami Dolphins roster
Quarterbacks (QB): 11 Gus Frerotte; 17 Cleo Lemon; 18 Sage Rosenfels; Running backs (RB): 36 Darian Barnes; 23 Ronnie Brown; 28 Travis Minor; 31 Sammy Morris; 34 Ricky Williams; Wide receivers (WR): 86 Marty Booker; 84 Chris Chambers; 82 Bryan Gilmore; 88 Cliff Russell; 83 Wes Welker; Tight ends (TE): 89 Alex Holmes; 81 Randy McMichael; 87 Lorenzo Diamond	Offensive linemen (OL): 79 Anthony Alabi OT; 65 Joe Berger G; 69 C.J. Brooks G; 72 Vernon Carey OT; 63 Alonzo Ephraim C; 66 Rex Hadnot G; 78 Jeno James G; 73 Stockar McDougle OT; 77 Damion McIntosh OT; Defensive linemen (DL): 96 David Bowens DE; 93 Kevin Carter DE; 91 Vonnie Holliday DT; 98 Matt Roth DE; 99 Jason Taylor DE; 94 Keith Traylor NT; 75 Manuel Wright DT; 90 Jeff Zgonina DT	Linebackers (LB): 52 Channing Crowder OLB; 51 Jason Glenn OLB; 53 Mike Labinjo MLB; 56 Derrick Pope OLB; 50 Nick Rogers OLB; 59 Donnie Spragan OLB; 54 Zach Thomas MLB; 57 Lester Towns MLB; Defensive backs (DB): 37 Yeremiah Bell SS; 21 Travis Daniels CB; 25 Reggie Howard CB; 35 Eddie Jackson CB; 42 Norman LeJeune FS; 29 Sam Madison CB; 30 Lance Schulters FS; 20 Kiwaukee Thomas CB; 26 Travares Tillman SS; Special teams (ST): 97 John Denney LS; 5 Donnie Jones P; 10 Olindo Mare K	Practice squad: 9 Chris Davis WR; 16 Fred Gibson WR; 43 Kay-Jay Harris RB; 49 Jack Hunt S; 41 Jason Rader TE; 61 Orrin Thompson OT; -- Chris Van Hoy DT; 15 Jason Willis WR; Reserve: 80 David Boston WR (IR); 38 Kyle Eckel FB (Military); 24 Tebucky Jones S (IR); 68 Seth McKinney C (IR); 45 Shirdonya Mitchell CB (NF-Inj.); 58 Eddie Moore LB (IR); 14 Kendall Newson WR (IR); 27 Will Poole CB (IR); 55 Junior Seau LB (IR); 74 Wade Smith OT (IR); 92 Kevin Vickerson DT (IR); 62 Eric Wilson DT (IR); Rookies in italics 53 active, 12 reserve, 8 practice squad

== Schedule ==
In addition to their regular games with AFC East rivals, the Dolphins played teams from the AFC West and NFC South as per the schedule rotation, and also played intraconference games against the Browns and the Titans based on divisional positions from 2004.

Week	Date	Opponent	Result	Record	Venue	Attendance
1	September 11	Denver Broncos	W 34–10	1–0	Dolphins Stadium	72,324
2	September 18	at New York Jets	L 7–17	1–1	Giants Stadium	77,918
3	September 25	Carolina Panthers	W 27–24	2–1	Dolphins Stadium	72,288
4	Bye					
5	October 9	at Buffalo Bills	L 14–20	2–2	Ralph Wilson Stadium	72,160
6	October 16	at Tampa Bay Buccaneers	L 13–27	2–3	Raymond James Stadium	65,168
7	October 21	Kansas City Chiefs	L 20–30	2–4	Dolphins Stadium	68,350
8	October 30	at New Orleans Saints	W 21–6	3–4	Tiger Stadium	61,643
9	November 6	Atlanta Falcons	L 10–17	3–5	Dolphins Stadium	72,187
10	November 13	New England Patriots	L 16–23	3–6	Dolphins Stadium	73,405
11	November 20	at Cleveland Browns	L 0–22	3–7	Cleveland Browns Stadium	72,773
12	November 27	at Oakland Raiders	W 33–21	4–7	McAfee Stadium	49,097
13	December 4	Buffalo Bills	W 24–23	5–7	Dolphins Stadium	72,051
14	December 11	at San Diego Chargers	W 23–21	6–7	Qualcomm Stadium	65,026
15	December 18	New York Jets	W 24–20	7–7	Dolphins Stadium	72,650
16	December 24	Tennessee Titans	W 24–10	8–7	Dolphins Stadium	72,001
17	January 1	at New England Patriots	W 28–26	9–7	Gillette Stadium	68,756

=== Game summaries ===
==== Week 1: vs. Denver Broncos ====
Week 1: Denver Broncos at Miami Dolphins – Game summary

Quarter	1	2	3	4	Total
Broncos	0	3	0	7	10
Dolphins	3	3	7	21	34

at Dolphins Stadium, Miami Gardens, Florida

- Date: September 11
- Game time: 1:00 p.m. EDT
- Game weather: Partly cloudy, 89 °F (32 °C)
- Game attendance: 72,324
- Referee: Bill Leavy
- TV announcers (CBS): Verne Lundquist, Dan Dierdorf, and Armen Keteyian
- Box score

Game information

First quarter

- MIA – Olindo Mare 29-yard field goal, 5:50. Dolphins 3–0. Drive: 9 plays, 69 yards, 3:53.

Second quarter

- MIA – Olindo Mare 44-yard field goal, 12:36. Dolphins 6–0. Drive: 14 plays, 54 yards, 6:03.
- DEN – Jason Elam 28-yard field goal, 1:51. Dolphins 6–3. Drive: 7 plays, 32 yards, 2:31.

Third quarter

- MIA – Randy McMichael 2-yard pass from Gus Frerotte (Olindo Mare kick), 4:47. Dolphins 13–3. Drive: 9 plays, 61 yards, 4:23.

Fourth quarter

- MIA – Sammy Morris 9-yard run (Olindo Mare kick), 13:11. Dolphins 20–3. Drive: 10 plays, 68 yards, 4:49.
- DEN – Kyle Johnson 2-yard pass from Jake Plummer (Jason Elam kick), 9:19. Dolphins 20–10. Drive: 6 plays, 26 yards, 2:17.
- MIA – Marty Booker 60-yard pass from Gus Frerotte (Olindo Mare kick), 9:09. Dolphins 27–10. Drive: 1 play, 60 yards, 0:10.
- MIA – Jason Taylor 85-yard fumble return (Olindo Mare kick), 0:00. Dolphins 34–10.

Top passers

- DEN – Jake Plummer – 22/48, 251 yards, TD, 2 INT
- MIA – Gus Frerotte – 24/36, 275 yards, 2 TD, INT

Top rushers

- DEN – Tatum Bell – 13 rushes, 47 yards
- MIA – Chris Chambers – 1 rush, 61 yards

Top receivers

- DEN – Rod Smith – 7 receptions, 90 yards
- MIA – Marty Booker – 5 receptions, 104 yards, TD

==== Week 2: at New York Jets ====
Week 2: Miami Dolphins at New York Jets – Game summary

Quarter	1	2	3	4	Total
Dolphins	0	0	0	7	7
Jets	7	3	0	7	17

at Giants Stadium, East Rutherford, New Jersey

- Date: September 18
- Game time: 4:00 p.m. EDT
- Game weather: Sunny, 82 °F (28 °C)
- Game attendance: 77,918
- Referee: Ron Winter
- TV announcers (CBS): Ian Eagle and Solomon Wilcots
- Box score

Game information

First quarter

- NYJ – Laveranues Coles 7-yard pass from Chad Pennington (Mike Nugent kick), 9:32. Jets 7–0. Drive: 9 plays, 80 yards, 5:28.

Second quarter

- NYJ – Mike Nugent 41-yard field goal, 1:02. Jets 10–0. Drive: 7 plays, 20 yards, 2:21.

Third quarter

- No scoring plays

Fourth quarter

- MIA – Randy McMichael 4-yard pass from Gus Frerotte (Olindo Mare kick), 14:13. Jets 10–7. Drive: 7 plays, 41 yards, 3:29.
- NYJ – Jerald Sowell 1-yard pass from Chad Pennington (Mike Nugent kick), 8:19. Jets 17–7. Drive: 10 plays, 80 yards, 5:54.

Top passers

- MIA – Gus Frerotte – 20/43, 177 yards, TD, INT
- NYJ – Chad Pennington – 19/30, 190 yards, 2 TD

Top rushers

- MIA – Ronnie Brown – 12 rushes, 35 yards
- NYJ – Curtis Martin – 31 rushes, 72 yards

Top receivers

- MIA – Randy McMichael – 8 receptions, 77 yards, TD
- NYJ – Justin McCareins – 5 receptions, 87 yards

==== Week 3: vs. Carolina Panthers ====
Week 3: Carolina Panthers at Miami Dolphins – Game summary

Quarter	1	2	3	4	Total
Panthers	3	14	0	7	24
Dolphins	14	7	0	6	27

at Dolphins Stadium, Miami Gardens, Florida

- Date: September 25
- Game time: 1:00 p.m. EDT
- Game weather: Partly cloudy, 85 °F (29 °C)
- Game attendance: 72,288
- Referee: Bill Vinovich
- TV announcers (Fox): Sam Rosen, Bill Maas, and Chris Myers
- Box score

Game information

First quarter

- MIA – Ronnie Brown 1-yard run (Olindo Mare kick), 10:09. Dolphins 7–0. Drive: 11 plays, 85 yards, 4:51.
- CAR – John Kasay 52-yard field goal, 7:11. Dolphins 7–3. Drive: 7 plays, 36 yards, 2:58.
- MIA – Randy McMichael 18-yard pass from Gus Frerotte (Olindo Mare kick), 0:10. Dolphins 14–3. Drive: 2 plays, 16 yards, 0:45.

Second quarter

- CAR – Steve Smith Sr. 1-yard pass from Jake Delhomme (John Kasay kick), 5:44. Dolphins 14–10. Drive: 9 plays, 56 yards, 5:40.
- MIA – Chris Chambers 42-yard pass from Gus Frerotte (Olindo Mare kick), 3:39. Dolphins 21–10. Drive: 5 plays, 60 yards, 2:05.
- CAR – Steve Smith Sr. 3-yard pass from Jake Delhomme (John Kasay kick), 0:54. Dolphins 21–17. Drive: 9 plays, 80 yards, 2:45.

Third quarter

- No scoring plays

Fourth quarter

- MIA – Olindo Mare 27-yard field goal, 7:32. Dolphins 24–17. Drive: 10 plays, 87 yards, 4:49.
- CAR – Steve Smith Sr. 53-yard pass from Jake Delhomme (John Kasay kick), 7:12. Tied 24–24. Drive: 2 plays, 80 yards, 0:20.
- MIA – Olindo Mare 32-yard field goal, 0:04. Dolphins 27–24. Drive: 5 plays, 11 yards, 1:47.

Top passers

- CAR – Jake Delhomme – 19/35, 285 yards, 3 TD, INT
- MIA – Gus Frerotte – 14/33, 171 yards, 2 TD, INT

Top rushers

- CAR – Stephen Davis – 16 rushes, 36 yards
- MIA – Ronnie Brown – 23 rushes, 132 yards, TD

Top receivers

- CAR – Steve Smith Sr. – 11 receptions, 170 yards, 3 TD
- MIA – Chris Chambers – 6 receptions, 93 yards, TD

==== Week 5: at Buffalo Bills ====
Week 5: Miami Dolphins at Buffalo Bills – Game summary

Quarter	1	2	3	4	Total
Dolphins	0	0	7	7	14
Bills	10	7	0	3	20

at Ralph Wilson Stadium, Orchard Park, New York

- Date: October 9
- Game time: 1:00 p.m. EDT
- Game weather: Partly cloudy, 50 °F (10 °C)
- Game attendance: 72,160
- Referee: Walt Coleman
- TV announcers (CBS): Kevin Harlan and Randy Cross
- Box score

Game information

First quarter

- BUF – Willis McGahee 1-yard run (Rian Lindell kick), 11:23. Bills 7–0. Drive: 8 plays, 67 yards, 3:37.
- BUF – Rian Lindell 24-yard field goal, 4:15. Bills 10–0. Drive: 11 plays, 51 yards, 5:38.

Second quarter

- BUF – Eric Moulds 2-yard pass from Kelly Holcomb (Rian Lindell kick), 8:08. Bills 17–0. Drive: 12 plays, 45 yards, 6:52.

Third quarter

- MIA – Will Heller 1-yard pass from Gus Frerotte (Olindo Mare kick), 5:50. Bills 17–7. Drive: 4 plays, 90 yards, 2:24.

Fourth quarter

- MIA – Randy McMichael 30-yard pass from Gus Frerotte (Olindo Mare kick), 8:18. Bills 17–14. Drive: 3 plays, 35 yards, 1:21.
- BUF – Rian Lindell 47-yard field goal, 4:35. Bills 20–14. Drive: 7 plays, 4 yards, 3:43.

Top passers

- MIA – Gus Frerotte – 21/33, 226 yards, 2 TD, 3 INT
- BUF – Kelly Holcomb – 20/26, 169 yards, TD

Top rushers

- MIA – Ronnie Brown – 17 rushes, 97 yards
- BUF – Willis McGahee – 31 rushes, 86 yards, TD

Top receivers

- MIA – Marty Booker – 3 receptions, 72 yards
- BUF – Lee Evans – 3 receptions, 65 yards

==== Week 6: at Tampa Bay Buccaneers ====
Week 6: Miami Dolphins at Tampa Bay Buccaneers – Game summary

Quarter	1	2	3	4	Total
Dolphins	3	0	3	7	13
Buccaneers	10	0	17	0	27

at Raymond James Stadium, Tampa, Florida

- Date: October 16
- Game time: 1:00 p.m. EDT
- Game weather: Sunny, 81 °F (27 °C)
- Game attendance: 65,168
- Referee: Ed Hochuli
- TV announcers (CBS): Kevin Harlan and Randy Cross
- Box score

Game information

First quarter

- TB – Joey Galloway 7-yard pass from Brian Griese (Matt Bryant kick), 9:05. Buccaneers 7–0. Drive: 10 plays, 78 yards, 5:55.
- MIA – Olindo Mare 47-yard field goal, 5:16. Buccaneers 7–3. Drive: 10 plays, 43 yards, 3:49.
- TB – Matt Bryant 36-yard field goal, 1:10. Buccaneers 10–3. Drive: 9 plays, 62 yards, 4:06.

Second quarter

- No scoring plays

Third quarter

- MIA – Olindo Mare 53-yard field goal, 11:46. Buccaneers 10–6. Drive: 7 plays, 38 yards, 3:14.
- TB – Matt Bryant 32-yard field goal, 4:32. Buccaneers 13–6. Drive: 14 plays, 66 yards, 7:14.
- TB – Michael Pittman Sr. 57-yard run (Matt Bryant kick), 1:32. Buccaneers 20–6. Drive: 3 plays, 66 yards, 1:34.
- TB – Will Allen 33-yard fumble return (Matt Bryant kick), 0:06. Buccaneers 27–6.

Fourth quarter

- MIA – Ronnie Brown 8-yard run (Olindo Mare kick), 9:56. Buccaneers 27–13. Drive: 1 play, 8 yards, 0:06.

Top passers

- MIA – Gus Frerotte – 21/43, 267 yards
- TB – Brian Griese – 12/16, 120 yards, TD

Top rushers

- MIA – Chris Chambers – 3 rushes, 25 yards
- TB – Michael Pittman Sr. – 15 rushes, 127 yards, TD

Top receivers

- MIA – Wes Welker – 3 receptions, 97 yards
- TB – Joey Galloway – 9 receptions, 96 yards, TD

==== Week 7: vs. Kansas City Chiefs ====
Week 7: Kansas City Chiefs at Miami Dolphins – Game summary

Quarter	1	2	3	4	Total
Chiefs	7	7	10	6	30
Dolphins	0	6	7	7	20

at Dolphins Stadium, Miami Gardens, Florida

- Date: October 21
- Game time: 7:00 p.m. EDT
- Game weather: Cloudy, 78 °F (26 °C)
- Game attendance: 68,350
- Referee: Gerry Austin
- TV announcers (CBS): Gus Johnson and Steve Tasker
- Box score

Game information

First quarter

- KC – Priest Holmes 5-yard run (Lawrence Tynes kick), 10:28. Chiefs 7–0. Drive: 8 plays, 80 yards, 4:32.

Second quarter

- MIA – Olindo Mare 33-yard field goal, 7:22. Chiefs 7–3. Drive: 4 plays, -4 yards, 1:52.
- KC – Larry Johnson 2-yard run (Lawrence Tynes kick), 1:56. Chiefs 14–3. Drive: 10 plays, 80 yards, 5:26.
- MIA – Olindo Mare 23-yard field goal, 0:05. Chiefs 14–6. Drive: 9 plays, 67 yards, 1:51.

Third quarter

- MIA – Ronnie Brown 65-yard run (Olindo Mare kick), 14:40. Chiefs 14–13. Drive: 1 play, 65 yards, 0:20.
- KC – Priest Holmes 35-yard run (Lawrence Tynes kick), 13:59. Chiefs 21–13. Drive: 2 plays, 59 yards, 0:41.
- KC – Lawrence Tynes 30-yard field goal, 3:37. Chiefs 24–13. Drive: 14 plays, 73 yards, 7:53.

Fourth quarter

- KC – Lawrence Tynes 51-yard field goal, 13:25. Chiefs 27–13. Drive: 9 plays, 42 yards, 3:52.
- KC – Lawrence Tynes 52-yard field goal, 10:41. Chiefs 30–13. Drive: 5 plays, 29 yards, 1:39.
- MIA – Chris Chambers 77-yard pass from Sage Rosenfels (Olindo Mare kick), 2:35. Chiefs 30–20. Drive: 1 play, 77 yards, 0:12.

Top passers

- KC – Trent Green – 20/34, 289 yards
- MIA – Gus Frerotte – 11/29, 125 yards, INT

Top rushers

- KC – Larry Johnson – 23 rushes, 93 yards, TD
- MIA – Ronnie Brown – 8 rushes, 95 yards, TD

Top receivers

- KC – Tony Gonzalez – 7 receptions, 67 yards
- MIA – Chris Chambers – 2 receptions, 88 yards, TD

==== Week 8: at New Orleans Saints ====
Week 8: Miami Dolphins at New Orleans Saints – Game summary

Quarter	1	2	3	4	Total
Dolphins	3	6	2	10	21
Saints	3	0	3	0	6

at Tiger Stadium, Baton Rouge, Louisiana

- Date: October 30
- Game time: 4:00 p.m. EST/3:00 p.m. CST
- Game weather: Sunny, 76 °F (24 °C)
- Game attendance: 61,643
- Referee: Tom White
- TV announcers (CBS): Gus Johnson and Steve Tasker
- Box score

Game information

First quarter

- NO – John Carney 26-yard field goal, 6:48. Saints 3–0. Drive: 10 plays, 57 yards, 5:01.
- MIA – Olindo Mare 37-yard field goal, 0:33. Tied 3–3. Drive: 7 plays, 10 yards, 3:14.

Second quarter

- MIA – Olindo Mare 36-yard field goal, 7:18. Dolphins 6–3. Drive: 14 plays, 62 yards, 5:34.
- MIA – Olindo Mare 41-yard field goal, 0:00. Dolphins 9–3. Drive: 8 plays, 37 yards, 1:43.

Third quarter

- NO – John Carney 49-yard field goal, 3:37. Dolphins 9–6. Drive: 4 plays, -2 yards, 1:05.
- MIA – Aaron Brooks sacked in own end zone by Kevin Carter, 1:52. Dolphins 11–6.

Fourth quarter

- MIA – Chris Chambers 12-yard pass from Gus Frerotte (Olindo Mare kick), 14:09. Dolphins 18–6. Drive: 5 plays, 51 yards, 2:43.
- MIA – Olindo Mare 46-yard field goal, 9:28. Dolphins 21–6. Drive: 8 plays, 33 yards, 3:46.

Top passers

- MIA – Gus Frerotte – 16/28, 168 yards, TD, INT
- NO – Aaron Brooks – 14/31, 181 yards, INT

Top rushers

- MIA – Ronnie Brown – 23 rushes, 106 yards
- NO – Aaron Brooks – 6 rushes, 34 yards

Top receivers

- MIA – David Boston – 1 reception, 54 yards
- NO – Joe Horn – 7 receptions, 99 yards

==== Week 9: vs. Atlanta Falcons ====
Week 9: Atlanta Falcons at Miami Dolphins – Game summary

Quarter	1	2	3	4	Total
Falcons	7	7	3	0	17
Dolphins	0	10	0	0	10

at Dolphins Stadium, Miami Gardens, Florida

- Date: November 6
- Game time: 1:00 p.m. EST
- Game weather: Partly cloudy, 80 °F (27 °C)
- Game attendance: 72,187
- Referee: Scott Green
- TV announcers (Fox): Dick Stockton, Daryl Johnston, Tony Siragusa
- Box score

==== Week 10: vs. New England Patriots ====
Week 10: New England Patriots at Miami Dolphins – Game summary

Quarter	1	2	3	4	Total
Patriots	0	3	9	11	23
Dolphins	0	7	0	9	16

at Dolphins Stadium, Miami Gardens, Florida

- Date: November 13
- Game time: 1:00 p.m. EST
- Game weather: Mostly cloudy, 82 °F (28 °C)
- Game attendance: 73,405
- Referee: Mike Carey
- TV announcers (CBS): Jim Nantz, Phil Simms, and Bonnie Bernstein
- Box score

==== Week 11: at Cleveland Browns ====
Week 11: Miami Dolphins at Cleveland Browns – Game summary

Quarter	1	2	3	4	Total
Dolphins	0	0	0	0	0
Browns	9	3	10	0	22

at Cleveland Browns Stadium, Cleveland, Ohio

- Date: November 20
- Game time: 1:00 p.m. EST
- Game weather: Sunny, 48 °F (9 °C)
- Game attendance: 72,773
- Referee: Bernie Kukar
- TV announcers (CBS): Don Criqui and Steve Beuerlein
- Box score

Game information

First quarter

- CLE – Reuben Droughns 75-yard run (kick failed), 13:09. Browns 6–0. Drive: 1 play, 75 yards, 0:18.
- CLE – Phil Dawson 23-yard field goal, 7:03. Browns 9–0. Drive: 10 plays, 55 yards, 5:12.

Second quarter

- CLE – Phil Dawson 40-yard field goal, 0:00. Browns 12–0. Drive: 14 plays, 57 yards, 5:58.

Third quarter

- CLE – Terrelle Smith 6-yard pass from Trent Dilfer (Phil Dawson kick), 5:24. Browns 19–0. Drive: 5 plays, 28 yards, 2:07.
- CLE – Phil Dawson 24-yard field goal, 1:35. Browns 22–0. Drive: 7 plays, 35 yards, 3:35.

Fourth quarter

- No scoring plays

Top passers

- MIA – Gus Frerotte – 4/18, 53 yards
- CLE – Trent Dilfer – 11/18, 137 yards, TD

Top rushers

- MIA – Ricky Williams – 13 rushes, 83 yards
- CLE – Reuben Droughns – 30 rushes, 166 yards, TD

Top receivers

- MIA – Bryan Gilmore – 1 reception, 39 yards
- CLE – Braylon Edwards – 6 receptions, 90 yards

==== Week 12: at Oakland Raiders ====
Week 12: Miami Dolphins at Oakland Raiders – Game summary

Quarter	1	2	3	4	Total
Dolphins	7	7	9	10	33
Raiders	0	7	7	7	21

at McAfee Stadium, Oakland, California

- Date: November 27
- Game time: 4:00 p.m. EST/1:00 p.m. PST
- Game weather: Partly cloudy, 52 °F (11 °C)
- Game attendance: 49,097
- Referee: Ron Winter
- TV announcers (CBS): Ian Eagle and Solomon Wilcots
- Box score

==== Week 13: vs. Buffalo Bills ====
Week 13: Buffalo Bills at Miami Dolphins – Game summary

Quarter	1	2	3	4	Total
Bills	21	0	2	0	23
Dolphins	0	3	0	21	24

at Dolphins Stadium, Miami Gardens, Florida

- Date: December 4
- Game time: 1:00 p.m. EST
- Game weather: Partly cloudy, 77 °F (25 °C)
- Game attendance: 72,051
- Referee: Ed Hochuli
- TV announcers (CBS): Don Criqui and Steve Beuerlein
- Box score

Game information

First quarter

- BUF – Lee Evans 46-yard pass from J. P. Losman (Rian Lindell kick), 12:47. Bills 7–0. Drive: 4 plays, 61 yards, 2:13.
- BUF – Lee Evans 56-yard pass from J. P. Losman (Rian Lindell kick), 11:07. Bills 14–0. Drive: 1 play, 56 yards, 0:11.
- BUF – Lee Evans 4-yard pass from J. P. Losman (Rian Lindell kick), 2:14. Bills 21–0. Drive: 6 plays, 26 yards, 2:43.

Second quarter

- MIA – Olindo Mare 23-yard field goal, 0:43. Bills 21–3. Drive: 11 plays, 57 yards, 2:15.

Third quarter

- BUF – Gus Ferotte sacked in own end zone by London Fletcher, 10:12. Bills 23–3.

Fourth quarter

- MIA – Ricky Williams 5-yard run (Olindo Mare kick), 11:35. Bills 23–10. Drive: 9 plays, 70 yards, 2:18.
- MIA – Ronnie Brown 23-yard pass from Sage Rosenfels (Olindo Mare kick), 7:35. Bills 23–17. Drive: 8 plays, 49 yards, 2:18.
- MIA – Chris Chambers 4-yard pass from Sage Rosenfels (Olindo Mare kick), 0:06. Dolphins 24–23. Drive: 10 plays, 73 yards, 1:45.

Top passers

- BUF – J. P. Losman – 13/26, 224 yards, 3 TD, INT
- MIA – Sage Rosenfels – 22/37, 272 yards, 2 TD, INT

Top rushers

- BUF – Willis McGahee – 27 rushes, 81 yards
- MIA – Ricky Williams – 11 rushes, 46 yards, TD

Top receivers

- BUF – Lee Evans – 5 receptions, 117 yards, 3 TD
- MIA – Chris Chambers – 15 receptions, 238 yards, TD

==== Week 14: at San Diego Chargers ====
Week 14: Miami Dolphins at San Diego Chargers – Game summary

Quarter	1	2	3	4	Total
Dolphins	0	3	17	3	23
Chargers	7	0	0	14	21

at Qualcomm Stadium, San Diego, California

- Date: December 11
- Game time: 4:00 p.m. EST/1:00 p.m. PST
- Game weather: Sunny, 69 °F (21 °C)
- Game attendance: 65,026
- Referee: Tony Corrente
- TV announcers (CBS): Gus Johnson, Steve Tasker, and Scott Kaplan
- Box score

==== Week 15: vs. New York Jets ====
Week 15: New York Jets at Miami Dolphins – Game summary

Quarter	1	2	3	4	Total
Jets	0	10	7	3	20
Dolphins	7	3	0	14	24

at Dolphins Stadium, Miami Gardens, Florida

- Date: December 18
- Game time: 1:00 p.m. EST
- Game weather: Cloudy, 78 °F (26 °C)
- Game attendance: 72,650
- Referee: Walt Coleman
- TV announcers (CBS): Ian Eagle and Solomon Wilcots
- Box score

==== Week 16: vs. Tennessee Titans ====
Week 16: Tennessee Titans at Miami Dolphins – Game summary

Quarter	1	2	3	4	Total
Titans	3	0	0	7	10
Dolphins	0	17	0	7	24

at Dolphins Stadium, Miami Gardens, Florida

- Date: December 24
- Game time: 1:00 p.m. EST
- Game weather: Partly cloudy, 60 °F (16 °C)
- Game attendance: 72,001
- Referee: Walt Anderson
- TV announcers (CBS): Don Criqui and Steve Beuerlein
- Box score

Game information

First quarter

- TEN – Rob Bironas 24-yard field goal, 1:49. Titans 3–0. Drive: 4 plays, 4 yards, 1:31.

Second quarter

- MIA – Olindo Mare 25-yard field goal, 7:31. Tied 3–3. Drive: 8 plays, 34 yards, 2:52.
- MIA – Chris Chambers 7-yard pass from Gus Frerotte (Olindo Mare kick), 2:48. Dolphins 10–3. Drive: 8 plays, 61 yards, 3:49.
- MIA – Chris Chambers 7-yard pass from Gus Frerotte (Olindo Mare kick), 0:27. Dolphins 17–3. Drive: 8 plays, 48 yards, 1:16.

Third quarter

- No scoring plays

Fourth quarter

- TEN – Drew Bennett 55-yard pass from Billy Volek (Rob Bironas kick), 12:20. Dolphins 17–10. Drive: 1 play, 55 yards, 0:10.
- MIA – Ricky Williams 19-yard run (Olindo Mare kick), 1:48. Dolphins 24–10. Drive: 5 plays, 63 yards, 0:33.

Top passers

- TEN – Billy Volek – 14/24, 132 yards, TD
- MIA – Gus Frerotte – 14/30, 151 yards, 2 TD, INT

Top rushers

- TEN – Travis Henry – 16 rushes, 65 yards
- MIA – Ricky Williams – 26 rushes, 172 yards, TD

Top receivers

- TEN – Drew Bennett – 4 receptions, 70 yards, TD
- MIA – Chris Chambers – 5 receptions, 51 yards, 2 TD

==== Week 17: at New England Patriots ====
Week 17: Miami Dolphins at New England Patriots – Game summary

Quarter	1	2	3	4	Total
Dolphins	7	6	5	10	28
Patriots	7	3	3	13	26

at Gillette Stadium, Foxborough, Massachusetts

- Date: January 1, 2006
- Game time: 1:00 p.m. EST
- Game weather: Cloudy, 25 °F (−4 °C)
- Game attendance: 68,756
- Referee: Tom White
- TV announcers (CBS): Kevin Harlan and Randy Cross
- Box score

Game information

First quarter

- MIA – Ricky Williams 2-yard run (Olindo Mare kick), 3:59. Dolphins 7–0. Drive: 12 plays, 83 yards, 5:14.
- NE – Deion Branch 11-yard pass from Tom Brady (Adam Vinatieri kick), 0:58. Tied 7–7. Drive: 6 plays, 24 yards, 3:01.

Second quarter

- MIA – Olindo Mare 36-yard field goal, 5:51. Dolphins 10–7. Drive: 11 plays, 35 yards, 6:03.
- MIA – Olindo Mare 38-yard field goal, 0:38. Dolphins 13–7. Drive: 11 plays, 44 yards, 4:06.
- NE – Adam Vinatieri 49-yard field goal, 0:00. Dolphins 13–10. Drive: 5 plays, 38 yards, 0:38.

Third quarter

- MIA – Olindo Mare 41-yard field goal, 8:57. Dolphins 16–10. Drive: 12 plays, 54 yards, 6:03.
- NE – Adam Vinatieri 33-yard field goal, 4:41. Dolphins 16–13. Drive: 9 plays, 46 yards, 4:16.
- MIA – Matt Cassel sacked in own end zone by Reggie Howard, 1:24. Dolphins 18–13.

Fourth quarter

- MIA – Marty Booker 15-yard pass from Gus Frerotte (Olindo Mare kick), 9:07. Dolphins 25–13. Drive: 8 plays, 51 yards, 3:51.
- NE – Tim Dwight 9-yard pass from Matt Cassel (Doug Flutie kick), 6:10. Dolphins 25–20. Drive: 5 plays, 54 yards, 2:57.
- MIA – Olindo Mare 42-yard field goal, 1:55. Dolphins 28–20. Drive: 9 plays, 36 yards, 4:15.
- NE – Benjamin Watson 9-yard pass from Matt Cassel (pass failed), 0:00. Dolphins 28–26. Drive: 11 plays, 62 yards, 1:55.

Top passers

- MIA – Gus Frerotte – 22/35, 239 yards, TD
- NE – Matt Cassel – 11/20, 168 yards, 2 TD

Top rushers

- MIA – Ricky Williams – 28 rushes, 108 yards, TD
- NE – Patrick Pass – 9 rushes, 26 yards

Top receivers

- MIA – Marty Booker – 7 receptions, 86 yards, TD
- NE – André Davis – 2 receptions, 47 yards

== Standings ==
AFC East
	W	L	T	PCT	DIV	CONF	PF	PA	STK
^{(4)} New England Patriots	10	6	0	.625	5–1	7–5	379	338	L1
Miami Dolphins	9	7	0	.563	3–3	7–5	318	317	W6
Buffalo Bills	5	11	0	.313	2–4	5–7	271	367	L1
New York Jets	4	12	0	.250	2–4	3–9	240	355	W1
