= Marty Booker =

American football player (born 1976)

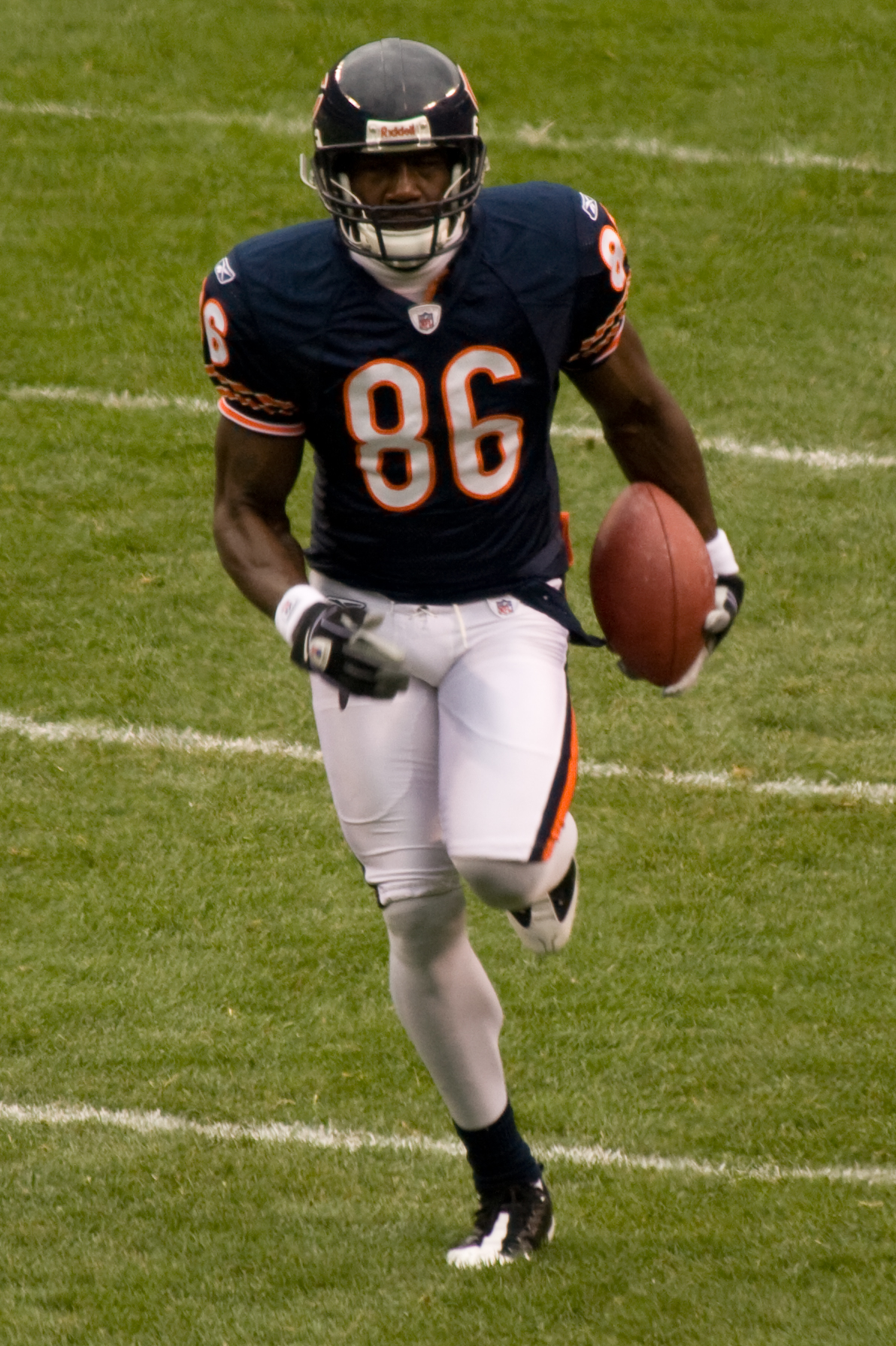
- Booker with the Chicago Bears in 2008

No. 86, 80
- Position: Wide receiver

Personal information
- Born: July 31, 1976 (age 50); Marrero, Louisiana, U.S.
- Listed height: 6 ft 0 in (1.83 m)
- Listed weight: 205 lb (93 kg)

Career information
- High school: Jonesboro-Hodge (Jonesboro, Louisiana)
- College: Louisiana-Monroe
- NFL draft: 1999: 3rd round, 78th overall pick

Career history
- Chicago Bears (1999–2003); Miami Dolphins (2004–2007); Chicago Bears (2008); Atlanta Falcons (2009)

Awards and highlights
- Pro Bowl (2002); First-team All-Independent (1998)

Career NFL statistics
- Receptions: 539
- Receiving yards: 6,703
- Receiving touchdowns: 37
- Stats at Pro Football Reference

Marty Montez Booker (born July 31, 1976) is an American former professional football player who was a wide receiver who played 11 seasons in the National Football League (NFL). After playing college football for the Louisiana–Monroe Warhawks, he was selected by the Chicago Bears in the third round of the 1999 NFL draft. During his first tenure with the Bears, he earned a Pro Bowl selection in 2002. He also played for the Miami Dolphins from 2004 to 2007, Bears in 2008, and Atlanta Falcons in 2009.

== Early life ==
Marty Montez Booker was born July 31, 1976, to Vera and Calvin Booker of Marrero, La. Booker attended Jonesboro-Hodge High School in Jonesboro, Louisiana. He was a two-sport standout in both football and track. In football, he was a quarterback and passed for 3,418 yards (3,125 m) and 48 combined touchdowns as a senior, at a college meet, he was told that he was super athletic, and quarterback wasn't the right spot for him, he chose WR. Following his senior season, he finished as the runner-up for the national Gatorade High School Player of the Year award. In track, he was ranked second in the state high jump finals as a senior. Booker also was a standout basketball player.

== College career ==
Marty Booker attended the University of Louisiana-Monroe where he was a three-year starter. He finished his college career with 178 receptions for 2,784 yards (15.6 avg.) and 23 touchdowns. He was an All-Independent first-team selection as a senior with 75 catches for 1,168 yards (1,068 m) and 11 touchdowns, averaging 106.2 yards (97.1 m) per game. He ranks second in school history for career receptions.

== Professional career ==
Pre-draft measurables
Height	Weight	Arm length	Hand span	40-yard dash	10-yard split	20-yard split	Vertical jump	Broad jump
5 ft 11 3/4 in (1.82 m)	214 lb (97 kg)	32 3/4 in (0.83 m)	9 1/8 in (0.23 m)	4.64 s	1.55 s	2.66 s	37.0 in (0.94 m)	10 ft 1 in (3.07 m)
All values from NFL Combine

=== Chicago Bears (first stint) ===
Booker was selected in the third round (78th overall) in the 1999 NFL draft by the Chicago Bears. He started four of the nine games in which he played during his rookie season, catching 19 passes for 219yd and three touchdowns. He did not play in each of the first six games of the season, with his first regular season action coming on an October 24 contest against the Tampa Bay Buccaneers. Booker's first career reception occurred on November 15 against the Minnesota Vikings, when he grabbed seven passes for 134yd and two touchdowns in what was also the first start of his career. He became the first Bears rookie to register a 100-yard (91 m) receiving game since Willie Gault in 1983. Booker also combined with Marcus Robinson to become the 15th tandem in Bears history to record 100-yard (91 m) receiving games in the same contest.

In 2000, Booker started seven of the 15 games in which he played, finishing third on the team with 47 receptions for 490 yards (450 m) and a pair of scores . He was inactive for a September 17 game against the New York Giants with a shoulder injury. He had five catches for 56 yards (51 m) against the Detroit Lions on September 24 - a game which began his streak of 82 straight games with a reception.

In 2001, Booker started all 16 games and set a Bears single-season reception record with 100, breaking the old mark of 93 set by Johnny Morris in 1964. That total also ranked second in the NFC and sixth in the NFL. On the season, he totaled 1,071 receiving yards, good for ninth in the NFC. He became just the seventh receiver (8th time) in Bears history to post a 1,000-yard (910 m) receiving season. He collected a season-high nine receptions on five occasions, including each of the first two games. In a 31–3 win at the Atlanta Falcons on October 7, he had a 63-yard (58 m) TD catch from Jim Miller and a 34-yard (31 m) TD pass to Marcus Robinson. He hauled in seven passes for 165 yards (151 m) and a career-high three touchdowns in 27–24 win at the Tampa Bay Buccaneers on November 18, including a career-long 66-yard (60 m) TD catch (from Miller) in the game.

Booker earned the first Pro Bowl berth of his career in 2002 as he accumulated 97 receptions for 1,189 yards (1,087 m) and six touchdowns. He became the first Bears wide receiver to earn Pro Bowl status since Dick Gordon in 1972. Booker's reception total was second in team history, trailing only his 100 catches from 2001, while his yardage total was the fourth-best single-season figure. His reception total also was third in the NFC and tied for sixth in the NFL in 2002 while yardage figure was seventh in the NFC and ninth in the NFL. He became just the second Bear to account for multiple 1,000-yard (910 m) receiving seasons in a career, joining Harlon Hill (1954, 1956) Booker tied for fourth in the NFL with 20 receptions of 20 yards (18 m) or longer, while placing seventh in the NFC with 54 first-down catches and sixth in the conference with 24 third-down receptions. He amassed a career-high three 100-yard (91 m) receiving games on the season, including the opener against the Minnesota Vikings on September 8 when he produced 198 yards (181 m) - tied for the third highest single-game total in Bears history. His second 100-yard (91 m) game of the season occurred against the Green Bay Packers on October 7, when he hauled in a career-high 12 passes - the fourth-highest single-game total in team history. Booker also threw a 44-yard (40 m) touchdown pass to Marcus Robinson against the New England Patriots on November 10.

Booker started all 13 games in which he played in 2003 and was the Bears’ leading receiver for the third straight year, catching 52 passes for 715 yards (654 m) and four touchdowns. He was inactive for three games in October and November with an ankle injury. He compiled the seventh 100-yard (91 m) receiving game of his career as he totaled 115 yards (105 m) on five receptions, including a 61-yard (56 m) TD catch, at Green Bay on December 7, when he tied Neal Anderson for fifth on Chicago's all-time receiving list with 302. Booker caught six passes for 92 yards (84 m) in finale at the Kansas City Chiefs on December 28, as he set a Bears record for consecutive games with a reception (58).

Booker concluded his Chicago career with 315 receptions for 3,684 yards (3,369 m) and 23 touchdowns. He ranks fifth on the team's all-time chart for receptions and sixth for receiving yards. His reception total was the most by any Bear in his first five years with the club while his yardage figure was third during this same time span.

On August 23, 2004, the Bears traded Booker and their third-round draft pick in 2005 to the Miami Dolphins in exchange for defensive end Adewale Ogunleye, who was coming off a career-high 15 sacks with the Dolphins in 2003. The following April, the Dolphins used the third-round draft choice acquired from the Bears on Florida linebacker Channing Crowder, who developed into a productive starter for Miami during his 6 years.

=== Miami Dolphins ===
Booker started 15 games during his first season with the Dolphins in 2004. He finished third on the team with 50 receptions for 638 yards and a touchdown, behind fellow wide receiver Chris Chambers and tight end Randy McMichael. He had a reception in every game that he played for the fourth year in a row. Booker turned in his most productive receiving day of the season at the New England Patriots on October 10, when he hauled in seven passes for 123 yards. His entire receiving total from the game came in the second half as he became the first Dolphin to account for 100 yards receiving in a half since December 15, 2002, when Chris Chambers had 117 yards in the first half against the Oakland Raiders. Booker tossed a 48-yard completion to Chambers against the St. Louis Rams on October 24 for the third and longest completion of his career. That led to a Sammy Morris eight-yard touchdown run on the next play from scrimmage for the Dolphins’ first score of a game they went on to win, 31–14, as they earned their initial victory of the season. He was inactive for finale at the Baltimore Ravens on January 2, 2005, with an ankle injury.

In 2005, Booker started 12 of the 15 games in which he played, and was inactive for one contest. The three games he did not start occurred when Dolphins opened with two tight ends. He caught 39 passes for 686 yards and three touchdowns on the season. His reception total ranked third on the team, behind Chris Chambers and Randy McMichael while his yardage figure was second (behind only Chambers). Booker's average per catch of 17.6 was the best on the team among players with more than five receptions, and also marked a personal best. It also was the best figure by a Dolphin since 2002 when James McKnight put together an 18.2 mark. Booker accounted for a pair of 100-yard receiving games on the year, including the season opener against the Denver Broncos when he hauled in five passes for 104 yards. Included in that total was a 60-yard touchdown reception from quarterback Gus Frerotte - the second-longest pass play by the Dolphins in 2005. It was also Booker's fourth career catch of 60 yards or longer and his longest since he had a 61-yard touchdown catch on December 7, 2003, at Green Bay as a member of the Chicago Bears. He had five catches for 102 yards against the New England Patriots on November 13, marking the first time since 2002 that he had two or more 100-yard receiving games in the same season. He was held without a catch at Cleveland on November 20, snapping his streak of 82 straight games with a reception. Prior to that, the last time he did not have a catch was on September 10, 2000, at Tampa Bay as a member of the Chicago Bears. Booker had two receptions for 56 yards on December 18 against the New York Jets, including a 50-yard touchdown catch from Sage Rosenfels 4:05 into the fourth quarter, which broke a 17–17 tie as the Dolphins held on for a 24–20 victory. Booker hauled in a 15-yard touchdown pass from Gus Frerotte in fourth quarter of a January 1 contest against the New England Patriots, giving the Dolphins a 25–13 lead in their 28–26 victory.

In 2006, Booker finished first on the team in reception yardage and in touchdown receptions with 55 catches for 747 yards and six touchdowns. He had two other receptions for two-point conversions and also has three rushes for 19 yards. His receiving totals were his highest in all three categories since his 2002 season as a member of the Chicago Bears. In addition, his six touchdown receptions is tied for the second highest single season total of his career (along with his six TD catches in 2002 as a member of the Bears), surpassed only by his eight touchdown catches in 2001 with the Bears. Booker because a favorite target of quarterback Joey Harrington later in the season, with four touchdown catches in three games from Weeks 11 to 13. Booker started 14 games during the season and was inactive twice - on December 25 against the New York Jets due to an ankle injury and on October 15 at the New York Jets due to a chest injury.

A projected starter in 2007, it was reported on April 26 that Booker was on the trade bloc.

However, Booker remained with the Dolphins as their No. 2 receiver behind Chris Chambers, with the team trying to work rookie first round pick Ted Ginn Jr. and Derek Hagan more into the offense.

Following a disastrous start to the season for the Dolphins, Chris Chambers was traded on October 16 to the Chargers for their second round draft pick in 2008. Booker then became the only experienced receiver for rookie QB John Beck and career back-up Cleo Lemon to throw to for the rest of the season.

During the following offseason on February 11, 2008, Booker was one of nine players released by the Dolphins.

=== Chicago Bears (second stint) ===
On March 4, 2008, Booker agreed to a two-year contract with the Chicago Bears worth $3.5 million. He caught only 14 passes for 211 yards and 2 touchdowns, including a 51-yard touchdown reception. Booker was released by the Bears on February 13, 2009.

=== Atlanta Falcons ===
Booker signed with the Atlanta Falcons on August 6, 2009, after the team waived undrafted rookie wide receiver Bradon Godfrey. Booker became an unrestricted free agent at the end of the 2009 season.

== NFL career statistics ==
Year	Team	Games		Receiving					Rushing				
Year	Team	GP	GS	Rec	Yds	Avg	Lng	TD	Att	Yds	Avg	Lng	TD
1999	CHI	9	4	19	219	11.5	57	3	1	8	8.0	8	0
2000	CHI	15	7	47	490	10.4	41	2	2	-1	-0.5	5	0
2001	CHI	16	16	100	1,071	10.7	66	8	4	8	2.0	13	0
2002	CHI	16	16	97	1,189	12.3	54	6	—	—	—	—	0
2003	CHI	13	13	52	715	13.8	61	4	3	-7	-2.3	1	0
2004	MIA	15	15	50	638	12.8	45	1	1	-8	-8.0	-8	0
2005	MIA	15	12	39	686	17.6	60	3	—	—	—	—	0
2006	MIA	14	13	55	747	13.6	52	6	3	19	6.3	18	0
2007	MIA	15	15	50	556	11.1	26	1	2	12	6.0	12	0
2008	CHI	13	5	14	211	15.1	51	2	1	3	3.0	3	0
2009	ATL	16	1	16	181	11.3	27	1	1	7	7.0	7	0
Career		157	117	539	6,703	12.4	66	37	18	41	2.3	18	0
