= 2006 Miami Dolphins season =

41st season in franchise history

- Owner: Wayne Huizenga
- General manager: Randy Mueller
- Head coach: Nick Saban
- Home stadium: Dolphin Stadium

Results
- Record: 6–10
- Division place: 4th AFC East
- Playoffs: Did not qualify
- All-Pros: Jason Taylor; Zach Thomas
- Pro Bowlers: DE Jason Taylor; LB Zach Thomas

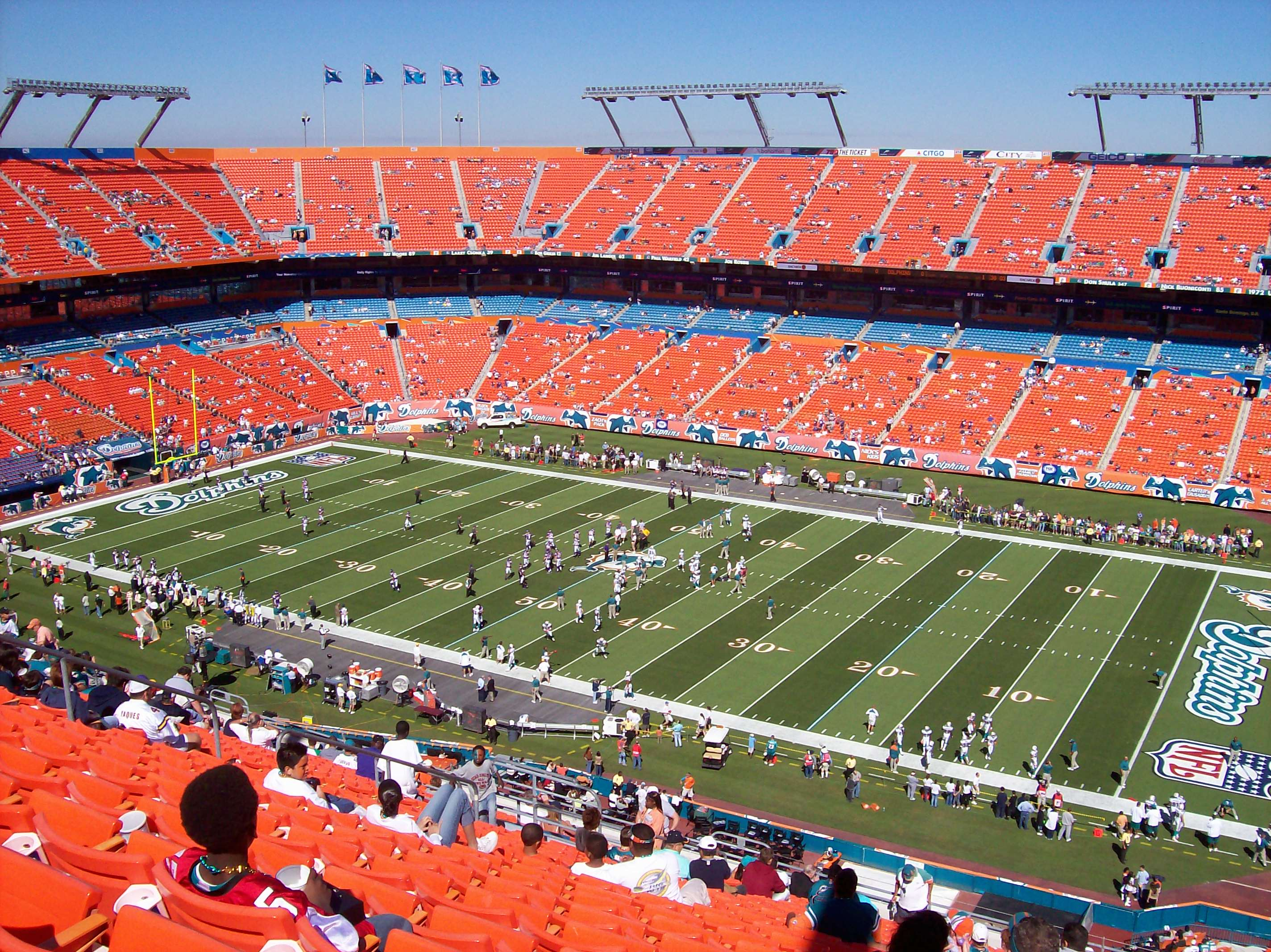
Inside of Dolphin Stadium taken before the Dolphins/Vikings game November 19, 2006

The 2006 season was the Miami Dolphins' 37th season in the National Football League (NFL), their 41st overall, their second under general manager Randy Mueller and second and final under head coach Nick Saban.

The Dolphins had high expectations after winning their last six games of the 2005 season, and were picked by Sports Illustrated to reach Super Bowl XLI. Instead, the Dolphins failed to improve on their 9–7 record in 2005, and they finished the 2006 season 6–10, which was just their second losing season since 1988. After the season, Dolphins coach Nick Saban abandoned his contract to coach college football for the Alabama Crimson Tide, despite saying repeatedly that he would stay in Miami.

This season was also notorious for the Dolphins almost signing former San Diego Chargers quarterback Drew Brees, as they were one of the two teams (the other being the New Orleans Saints) interested in acquiring the released quarterback. However the Dolphins later declined the idea after doctors informed them that Brees’ shoulder injury was too severe, and they ended up signing Daunte Culpepper instead.

== Offseason ==
On March 14, 2006, the Dolphins traded a second round draft pick to the Minnesota Vikings to acquire quarterback Daunte Culpepper. Miami also acquired offensive tackle L. J. Shelton from Cleveland and cornerback Will Allen from the New York Giants, replacing longtime Dolphin Sam Madison, who had taken Allen's old spot with the Giants. The Dolphins had also nearly signed former-Saints quarterback Drew Brees, following his release by the San Diego Chargers and prior to the signing of Culpepper.

In the 2006 NFL draft, the Dolphins used their first pick on Tennessee safety Jason Allen. They then used their next pick on Arizona State wide receiver Derek Hagan. The rest of their picks included Washington offensive tackle Joe Toledo, Texas State/San Marcos defensive tackles Fred Evans and Rodrique Wright, and Auburn wide receiver Devin Aromashodu.

On May 12, 2006, the Dolphins completed a trade with the Detroit Lions for quarterback Joey Harrington, and the Lions received a fifth round pick after Harrington met performance stipulations in Miami. They also signed Marcus Vick (ex-Virginia Tech quarterback and younger brother of Atlanta Falcons star Michael Vick) to a contract after he attended their annual rookie minicamp.

On August 12, Miami lost, 23–19, to the Jacksonville Jaguars in their first preseason game of the year. The Dolphins' pulled out starting QB Daunte Culpepper after throwing only two passes. (1–2, 2 yds) All of the opposing Jaguars' touchdowns came on plays longer than 25 yards.

On August 14, the Dolphins signed free agent defensive tackle Dan "Big Daddy" Wilkinson, a former 1st overall draft pick of the Cincinnati Bengals (1994), and who had last played for the Detroit Lions.

On August 14, perennial All-Pro outside linebacker Junior Seau (who had been with the Dolphins for three seasons until he was released in March 2006) announced his retirement after 16 years in the NFL. However, he eventually joined the Dolphins' division rival, the New England Patriots.

== Draft ==
2006 Miami Dolphins Draft
Round	Selection	Player	Position	College
1	16	Jason Allen	FS	Tennessee
3	82	Derek Hagan	WR	Arizona State
4	114	Joe Toledo	OT	Washington
7	212	Fred Evans	DT	Texas State
7	226	Rodrique Wright	DT	Texas
7	233	Devin Aromashodu	WR	Auburn

== Staff ==
2006 Miami Dolphins staff
Front office: Owner/chairman of the board – Wayne Huizenga; Chief executive officer – Joe Bailey; Executive vice president/chief operating officer – Bryan Wiedmeier; General manager – Randy Mueller; Director of player development/special assistant to the head coach – John Gamble; Head coaches: Head coach – Nick Saban; Assistant head coach/wide receivers – Charlie Baggett; Offensive coaches: Offensive coordinator – Mike Mularkey; Quarterbacks – Jason Garrett; Running backs – Bobby Williams; Tight ends – Derek Dooley; Offensive line – Hudson Houck; Assistant offensive line – Tim Davis; Offensive assistant – James Coley	Defensive coaches: Defensive coordinator – Dom Capers; Defensive line – Dan Quinn; Assistant defensive line – Travis Jones; Assistant defensive line – Bo Davis; Linebackers – George Edwards; Secondary – Mel Phillips; Safeties – Kirby Smart; Defensive quality control – Glenn Pires; Special teams coaches: Special teams – Keith Armstrong; Strength and conditioning: Associate strength and conditioning – Bert Hill; Assistant strength and conditioning – Eric Fears

== Roster ==
2006 Miami Dolphins roster
Quarterbacks (QB): 3 Joey Harrington; 17 Cleo Lemon; 9 Shane Matthews; 16 Marcus Vick; Running backs (RB): 36 Darian Barnes FB; 23 Ronnie Brown; 38 Patrick Cobbs; 40 Kyle Eckel+ FB; 28 Travis Minor; 31 Sammy Morris; Wide receivers (WR): 86 Marty Booker; 84 Chris Chambers; 82 Derek Hagan; 83 Wes Welker; Tight ends (TE): 89 Tim Massaquoi; 81 Randy McMichael; 87 Justin Peelle	Offensive linemen (OL): 79 Anthony Alabi OT; 72 Vernon Carey OT; 71 Toniu Fonoti G; 66 Rex Hadnot C; 64 Kendyl Jacox C/G; 77 Damion McIntosh G/OT; 70 L. J. Shelton G/OT; 73 Dan Stevenson C/G; Defensive linemen (DL): 96 David Bowens DE; 93 Kevin Carter DE; 62 Fred Evans DT; 91 Vonnie Holliday DT; 76 Chase Page DT; 98 Matt Roth DE; 99 Jason Taylor DE; 92 Kevin Vickerson DT; 90 Jeff Zgonina DT	Linebackers (LB): 57 Keith Adams OLB; 52 Channing Crowder OLB; 53 Jim Maxwell OLB; 51 Robert McCune OLB; 56 Derrick Pope MLB; 59 Donnie Spragan OLB; 54 Zach Thomas MLB; Defensive backs (DB): 32 Jason Allen FS; 25 Will Allen CB; 37 Yeremiah Bell SS; 21 Travis Daniels CB; 24 Renaldo Hill FS; 43 Jack Hunt FS; 30 Michael Lehan CB; 42 Norman LeJeune FS; 27 Shirdonya Mitchell CB; 26 Travares Tillman SS; Special teams (ST): 97 John Denney LS; 5 Donnie Jones P; 10 Olindo Mare K	Practice squad: 18 Fred Gibson WR; 61 Lee Gray OT; 73 Tony Pape G; 85 Jason Rader TE; 14 P. K. Sam WR; 49 Guss Scott S; 15 Jason Willis WR; +Roster Exemption Reserve: 63 Bennie Anderson G (IR); 8 Daunte Culpepper QB (IR); 29 André Goodman CB (IR); 20 Eddie Jackson CB (IR); 78 Jeno James G (IR); 4 Eric Kimble WR (PUP); 68 Seth McKinney C (IR); 67 Joe Toledo OT (IR); 94 Keith Traylor DT (IR); 95 Dan Wilkinson DT (IR); 34 Ricky Williams RB (Susp.); -- Rodrique Wright DT (NF-Inj.); 75 Manuel Wright DT (NF-Ill.); Rookies in italics 53 active, 13 reserve, 7 practice squad

== Schedule ==
Week	Date	Opponent	Result	Record	Venue	Attendance
1	September 7	at Pittsburgh Steelers	L 17–28	0–1	Heinz Field	64,927
2	September 17	Buffalo Bills	L 6–16	0–2	Dolphin Stadium	72,797
3	September 24	Tennessee Titans	W 13–10	1–2	Dolphin Stadium	72,733
4	October 1	at Houston Texans	L 15–17	1–3	Reliant Stadium	70,071
5	October 8	at New England Patriots	L 10–20	1–4	Gillette Stadium	68,756
6	October 15	at New York Jets	L 17–20	1–5	Giants Stadium	77,439
7	October 22	Green Bay Packers	L 24–34	1–6	Dolphin Stadium	73,548
8	Bye					
9	November 5	at Chicago Bears	W 31–13	2–6	Soldier Field	62,206
10	November 12	Kansas City Chiefs	W 13–10	3–6	Dolphin Stadium	73,132
11	November 19	Minnesota Vikings	W 24–20	4–6	Dolphin Stadium	73,070
12	November 23	at Detroit Lions	W 27–10	5–6	Ford Field	61,562
13	December 3	Jacksonville Jaguars	L 10–24	5–7	Dolphin Stadium	73,160
14	December 10	New England Patriots	W 21–0	6–7	Dolphin Stadium	74,033
15	December 17	at Buffalo Bills	L 0–21	6–8	Ralph Wilson Stadium	71,011
16	December 25	New York Jets	L 10–13	6–9	Dolphin Stadium	73,500
17	December 31	at Indianapolis Colts	L 22–27	6–10	RCA Dome	57,310

== Standings ==
AFC East
	W	L	T	PCT	DIV	CONF	PF	PA	STK
^{(4)} New England Patriots	12	4	0	.750	4–2	8–4	385	237	W3
^{(5)} New York Jets	10	6	0	.625	4–2	7–5	316	295	W3
Buffalo Bills	7	9	0	.438	3–3	5–7	300	311	L2
Miami Dolphins	6	10	0	.375	1–5	3–9	260	283	L3

== Regular season ==
=== Week 1: at Pittsburgh Steelers ===
	1	2	3	4	Total
Dolphins	0	10	7	0	17
Steelers	0	14	0	14	28

at Heinz Field, Pittsburgh, Pennsylvania

The Dolphins opened the regular season in the annual Thursday NFL Kickoff Game against the Pittsburgh Steelers on September 7. Even though newly acquired QB Daunte Culpepper was doing a pretty good job on the pass and RB Ronnie Brown provided a touchdown, the Dolphins trailed 14–10 going into the second half, until Brown got another rushing touchdown. An 87-yard touchdown pass to Steeler tight end Heath Miller and a 42-yard interception return by ROLB Joey Porter sealed the Dolphins' fate. Head coach Nick Saban attempted to challenge Miller's touchdown reception on the grounds that he stepped out of bounds before reaching the goal line (which television replays proved was correct), however, officials failed to see Saban throw the red flag before the Steelers kicked the extra point, and the Dolphins were unable to challenge the call.

Of more concern than simply the loss was the performance of the Dolphins' prized offseason acquisition. Daunte Culpepper threw two interceptions, and floated several passes that were almost intercepted. This performance has sparked debate as to whether he will be able to return to his 2004 form or if he will have a repeat of his terrible 2005 campaign.

One positive from the game was slot WR Wes Welker. He had 67 yards receiving and set up the first TD for Miami.

With the loss, the Dolphins fell to 0–1.

=== Week 2: vs. Buffalo Bills ===
	1	2	3	4	Total
Bills	3	0	13	0	16
Dolphins	0	0	0	6	6

at Dolphin Stadium, Miami Gardens, Florida

The Dolphins were hoping to rebound by playing an AFC East bout with the visiting Buffalo Bills in their Week 2 home-opener. From the start, the Dolphins were unable to get anything going, as the Bills' Rian Lindell kicked a 33-yard field goal in the first quarter, while Buffalo's defense prevented Miami from getting any points throughout the first half. In the third quarter, things only got worse, as opposing QB J. P. Losman threw a 4-yard TD pass to opposing WR Josh Reed, while Lindell booted two field goals (45 & 43-yarders). The Dolphins finally managed to get some points as WR Chris Chambers caught a 23-yard TD pass, but Miami failed on the two-point conversion. What made this loss even more frustrating was that Dolphins QB Daunte Culpepper got sacked seven times and fumbled twice, making Miami wonder if acquiring Culpepper was the right idea in the first place. With the loss, the Dolphins were 0–2.

=== Week 3: vs. Tennessee Titans ===
	1	2	3	4	Total
Titans	0	7	3	0	10
Dolphins	3	0	7	3	13

at Dolphin Stadium, Miami Gardens, Florida

The Dolphins, still looking for their first win of the year, stayed at home for a Week 3 match-up with the Tennessee Titans. Miami drew first blood in the first quarter with kicker Olindo Mare kicking a 40-yard field goal. In the second quarter, the Dolphins got a bit of a scare as Titans QB Kerry Collins completed a 27-yard pass to TE Bo Scaife for a touchdown and the lead. In the third quarter, Miami reclaimed the lead with QB Daunte Culpepper getting a touchdown on a 5-yard scramble. However, the Titans didn't go down quietly, as kicker Rob Bironas kicked a 22-yard field goal for Tennessee, putting the game in a 10–10 tie. In the fourth quarter, Mare finally helped Miami get win their first win of the season with a 39-yard field goal.

=== Week 4: at Houston Texans ===
	1	2	3	4	Total
Dolphins	0	3	3	9	15
Texans	0	3	0	14	17

at Reliant Stadium, Houston, Texas

The Dolphins hoped to carry the momentum from their Week 3 victory, as they traveled to Reliant Stadium to take on the Houston Texans. After a scoreless first quarter, Miami got on the board first with kicker Olindo Mare getting a 52-yard field goal, but the Texans got a field goal for themselves, as kicker Kris Brown got one from 32 yards out. In the third quarter, the Dolphins got another field goal, as Mare got one from 29 yards out for the only score of the period. However, in the fourth quarter, things got very ugly as the Texans got two touchdowns, with QB David Carr on a 1-yard run and WR Andre Johnson getting a 3-yard touchdown reception. Miami valiantly tried to fight back, as Mare got a 22-yard field goal and QB Daunte Culpepper completed a 16-yard TD pass to WR Chris Chambers, but in the end, a failed two-point conversion spelled doom for the Dolphins, as Miami failed to come back and fell to 1–3.

=== Week 5: at New England Patriots ===
	1	2	3	4	Total
Dolphins	0	10	0	0	10
Patriots	3	10	0	7	20

at Gillette Stadium, Foxborough, Massachusetts

With Daunte Culpepper being ineffective, QB Joey Harrington got the start for Week 5 as the Dolphins flew to Gillette Stadium for an AFC East match-up with the New England Patriots. Miami got off to a rough start, as they fell behind 3–0 with Patriots kicker Stephen Gostkowski kicking a 35-yard field goal for the only score of the first quarter. In the second quarter, Miami continued to trail, as Gostkowski kicked a 31-yard field goal, while Pats QB Tom Brady completed a 10-yard TD pass to WR Troy Brown. The Dolphins got back in the game before halftime, as RB Ronnie Brown got a 2-yard TD run and kicker Olindo Mare got a 40-yard field goal to help the Dolphins trail by three at halftime. In the third quarter, the defense ruled as both teams failed to get a single point. In the fourth quarter, New England scored another touchdown, as Brady completed a 1-yard strike to FB Heath Evans. From there, Miami failed to catch up, and their record fell to 1–4.

=== Week 6: at New York Jets ===
	1	2	3	4	Total
Dolphins	0	0	3	14	17
Jets	3	0	10	7	20

at Giants Stadium, East Rutherford, New Jersey

Still searching for win #2, the Dolphins kept QB Joey Harrington in the starting line-up as they flew to The Meadowlands for an AFC East fight with the New York Jets. From the get-go, the Dolphins struggled as Jets kicker Mike Nugent kicked a 33-yard field goal for the only score of the first quarter and of the half. In the third quarter, Nugent increased New York's lead again with another 33-yard field goal. The Dolphins finally got on the board, as kicker Olindo Mare got a 21-yard field goal. However, the Jets didn't let Miami regain itself, as QB Chad Pennington completed a 58-yard TD pass to WR Laveranues Coles. In the fourth quarter, they hooked up with each other again on a 22-yard TD pass. The Dolphins attempted a fourth-quarter comeback, with Harrington completing a 2-yard TD pass to WR Chris Chambers and RB Ronnie Brown ran 1 yard for a TD, but when Mare missed a field goal attempt in the final minute, and the Dolphins sank to 1–5.

=== Week 7: vs. Green Bay Packers ===
	1	2	3	4	Total
Packers	0	6	14	14	34
Dolphins	7	3	3	11	24

at Dolphin Stadium, Miami Gardens, Florida

QB Joey Harrington had 414 yards off a record 62 attempts (33 of them were complete), but he also threw 3 INT's (one returned for a TD). Packers RB Ahman Green rushed for about 100 yards, including a 70 yd TD. Packers QB Brett Favre had 206 yards throwing and two 2 TD's and is closing on Dan Marino's all-time completions and touchdown records. Meanwhile, Favre's favorite WR Donald Driver had 10 receptions for 93 yards and a touchdown. With the Dolphins, RB Ronnie Brown was limited to just 59 yards rushing on 15 carries and 63 yards receiving on 5 receptions. The leading receiver for Miami was WR Marty Booker, who had 7 receptions for 110 yards and a touchdown. With the loss, the Dolphins fell to 1–6.

=== Week 9: at Chicago Bears ===
	1	2	3	4	Total
Dolphins	0	14	7	10	31
Bears	3	7	3	0	13

at Soldier Field, Chicago, Illinois

Coming off their bye week, the Dolphins got their second win of the season against the previously undefeated Chicago Bears at Soldier Field. Just as the 1985 Dolphins ended the Bears' attempt at a perfect season (they finished 18–1), this year's Dolphins again protected the 1972 Perfect Season on their own. QB Joey Harrington was 16/32, for 137 yards, and 3 touchdowns, despite 2 interceptions. The Dolphins fumbled twice, but recovered both times, and the Bears also fumbled twice, but both times Miami came away with the ball. The Dolphins were also able to capitalize on 3 interceptions on Rex Grossman passes. Ronnie Brown rushed for a career-high 157 yards, carrying 29 times. Jason Taylor forced a fumble and returned an interception 20 yards for a touchdown, helping Miami in its 31–13 victory. The spirit of the 1972 Dolphins looked alive and well as Miami improved to 2–6 on the year.

=== Week 10: vs. Kansas City Chiefs ===
	1	2	3	4	Total
Chiefs	0	0	0	10	10
Dolphins	3	10	0	0	13

at Dolphin Stadium, Miami Gardens, Florida

Coming off their amazing upset road win against the Bears, the Dolphins returned home for a Week 10 match-up with the Kansas City Chiefs. The Dolphins dominated the first half with kicker Olindo Mare getting a 40-yard field goal in the first quarter and a 22-yarder in the second quarter. Also in the second period, RB Ronnie Brown got a 1-yard TD run. After a scoreless third quarter, the Chiefs offense finally got going in the final period. Kicker Lawrence Tynes nailed a 27-yard field goal, while RB Larry Johnson got a 2-yard TD. Miami held on to its small lead and advanced to 3–6 on the year.

=== Week 11: vs. Minnesota Vikings ===
	1	2	3	4	Total
Vikings	7	0	3	10	20
Dolphins	0	10	0	14	24

at Dolphin Stadium, Miami Gardens, Florida

Coming off a two-game winning streak, the Dolphins stayed at home for a Week 11 fight against teammate Daunte Culpepper's former team, the Minnesota Vikings. In the first quarter, the Vikings struck first as RB Chester Taylor got a 1-yard TD run for the only score of the period. In the second quarter, the Dolphins took to the water as kicker Olindo Mare nailed a 44-yard field goal, while QB Joey Harrington got an 11-yard TD pass to TE Justin Peelle. In the third quarter, Minnesota came closer with kicker Ryan Longwell nailing a 35-yard field goal for the only score of the period. In the fourth quarter, the Vikings took a three-point lead, as Longwell kicked a 19-yard field goal. However, the Miami defense stepped up and made decisive plays. Free safety Renaldo Hill returned a fumble 48 yards for a touchdown, and DE Jason Taylor returned an interception 51 yards for a touchdown. Minnesota got one more touchdown (another 1-yard TD run by Taylor), but Miami ran out the clock to preserve their third victory in a row. With the win, the Dolphins improved to 4–6. The Dolphins' rushing yardage was a franchise low (−3 yards), and a team record for the Vikings' defense. NFL.com | Official Site of the National Football League

=== Week 12: at Detroit Lions ===
	1	2	3	4	Total
Dolphins	7	7	10	3	27
Lions	10	0	0	0	10

at Ford Field, Detroit, Michigan

Going for their fourth-straight win, the Dolphins traveled to Ford Field for a Thanksgiving fight with the Detroit Lions. This game was Dolphins' QB Joey Harrington's return to Detroit, and he was constantly booed throughout the contest. In the first quarter, Miami trailed as Lions QB Jon Kitna got Detroit off to a fast start. Kitna completed a 2-yard TD pass to TE Dan Campbell, while kicker Jason Hanson nailed a 52-yard field goal. Afterwards, Harrington started to get the Dolphins back into business as he completed his first-ever Thanksgiving touchdown pass on an 8-yard strike to WR Marty Booker. In the second quarter, Harrington acquired the only score of the period on a 5-yard TD pass to TE Randy McMichael. In the third quarter, kicker Olindo Mare nailed a 42-yard field goal, while Harrington and Booker connected with each other again on a 19-yard TD pass. In the fourth quarter, Mare managed to put the game away with a 28-yard field goal.

RB Ronnie Brown only had 68 yards rushing (with 5 yards receiving), as he left the game early with a broken left hand. He is currently week-to-week and will likely miss the team's next game against Jacksonville.

With the Dolphins victory, not only did the Dolphins improve to 5–6, but Harrington also got his second-ever Thanksgiving Day victory and 1st, 2nd, and 3rd touchdown pass ever on Thanksgiving Day.

=== Week 13: vs. Jacksonville Jaguars ===
	1	2	3	4	Total
Jaguars	3	14	0	7	24
Dolphins	7	0	0	3	10

at Dolphin Stadium, Miami Gardens, Florida

After a fine performance on Thanksgiving Day against the Lions, the Dolphins returned home for a Week 13 got off to a good start when QB Joey Harrington completed a 17-yard TD pass to WR Marty Booker. The Jaguars responded with kicker Josh Scobee's 48-yard field goal. In the second quarter, things started looking grim for Miami as QB David Garrard completed two TD passes to WR Matt Jones (for 15 yards) and TE George Wrighster (for 16 yards). After a scoreless third quarter, Jacksonville continued its dominance with RB Maurice Jones-Drew getting a 32-yard TD run. The Dolphins' only response was kicker Olindo Mare getting a 42-yard field goal. With the loss, the Dolphins fell to 5–7.

=== Week 14: vs. New England Patriots ===
	1	2	3	4	Total
Patriots	0	0	0	0	0
Dolphins	3	3	7	8	21

at Dolphin Stadium, Miami Gardens, Florida

Hoping to rebound from their loss to Jaguars, the Dolphins stayed at home for an AFC East rematch with the New England Patriots. From start to finish, Miami stayed in the driver's seat and lead throughout the game. In the first quarter, the Dolphins' dominating day began with kicker Olindo Mare getting a 35-yard field goal in the first quarter, while also getting a 33-yard field goal in the second quarter. In the third quarter, Miami continued their hot day as QB Joey Harrington completed a 32-yard TD pass to WR Marty Booker for the only score of the period. In the fourth quarter, RB Sammy Morris got a 3-yard TD run, which was followed up by a completed 2-point conversion pass from Harrington to Booker. An impressive Dolphins defense held the Patriots to just 189 total yards of offense, while sacking Pats QB Tom Brady four times. With the win, Miami improved to 6–7.

=== Week 15: at Buffalo Bills ===
	1	2	3	4	Total
Dolphins	0	0	0	0	0
Bills	0	7	7	7	21

at Ralph Wilson Stadium, Orchard Park, New York

Coming off their dominating win over the Patriots, the Dolphins flew to Ralph Wilson Stadium for an AFC East rematch with the Buffalo Bills. After a scoreless first quarter, Miami trailed early as in the second quarter, Bills QB J. P. Losman completed a 33-yard TD pass to TE Robert Royal for the only score of the period. In the third quarter, things got worse as Losman completed a 27-yard TD pass to WR Josh Reed for the only score of the period. In the fourth quarter, the Dolphins' playoff hopes were completely erased when Losman completed a 21-yard TD pass to WR Lee Evans. With the loss, not only did Miami fall to 6–8, but they were unable to make the playoffs (and thus unable to play Super Bowl XLI on their home turf as they were the host city for that game) as the Jets (8–6) and Jacksonville (8–6) would win by tiebreakers even if they lost their remaining two games.

=== Week 16: vs. New York Jets ===
	1	2	3	4	Total
Jets	0	0	3	10	13
Dolphins	0	0	0	10	10

at Dolphin Stadium, Miami Gardens, Florida

Coming off an embarrassing loss to the Bills, the Dolphins played their final home game of the year on a rainy Monday Night in an AFC East fight with the New York Jets. After a scoreless first half with QB Joey Harrington playing a mediocre 7/15 for 42 yards, back-up Cleo Lemon came in to begin the second half. In the third quarter, New York broke first with kicker Mike Nugent getting a 22-yard field goal for the only score of the period. In the fourth quarter, Miami finally went on the attack with Lemon completing a 7-yard TD pass to TE Randy McMichael. However, the Jets responded with QB Chad Pennington completing a 32-yard TD pass to WR Jerricho Cotchery. Even though the Dolphins managed to tie the game with kicker Olindo Mare's 25-yard field goal. New York made sure that head coach Nick Saban got his first losing season with the Dolphins after Nugent nailed the game-winning 30-yard field goal with ten seconds left. With the loss, Miami fell to 6–9.

=== Week 17: at Indianapolis Colts ===
	1	2	3	4	Total
Dolphins	3	3	6	10	22
Colts	0	17	3	7	27

at the RCA Dome, Indianapolis, Indiana

Trying to end their season on a high note, the Dolphins flew to the RCA Dome to take on the playoff-bound Indianapolis Colts. In the first quarter, Miami struck first with kicker Olindo Mare getting a 28-yard field goal for the only score of the period. In the second quarter, the Colts respond with QB Peyton Manning completing a 2-yard TD pass to DT Dan Klecko. The Dolphins answered with Mare kicking a 38-yard field goal. However, Indianapolis struck back with Manning getting an 11-yard TD run, while kicker Adam Vinatieri getting a 46-yard field goal to end the half. In the third quarter, Miami tried to fight back with Mare's 42-yard field goal, yet the Colts matched them with Vinatieri's 34-yard field goal. The Dolphins got another field goal from Mare as he kicked one from 27 yards out. In the fourth quarter, Mare and Miami drew closer with a 34-yard field goal, yet Indianapolis ran away with the win as Manning completing a 27-yard TD pass to WR Marvin Harrison. The Dolphins got a touchdown as QB Cleo Lemon completed a 6-yard TD pass to TE Randy McMichael. However, the Colts' performance showed why they continue to be an elite NFL team.

With the loss, Miami ended its season at 6–10 and out of the playoffs.

== Random facts ==
- In 2006, the Dolphins shut out the New England Patriots 21–0 the previous week and were shut out by the Buffalo Bills by the same deficit the next week.
- Starting quarterback Joey Harrington won the CBS All-Iron Award for his performance on Thanksgiving and got to sample Phil Simms' mother's blackberry cobbler.
- When Daunte Culpepper was signed by the Dolphins, Las Vegas odds-makers elevated the Dolphins' Super Bowl chances from 25-to-1 to 10-to-1.
- In the Thanksgiving game against the Detroit Lions, Taylor Swift sang the national anthem.
