= Fred Evans (defensive tackle) =

American football player (born 1983)

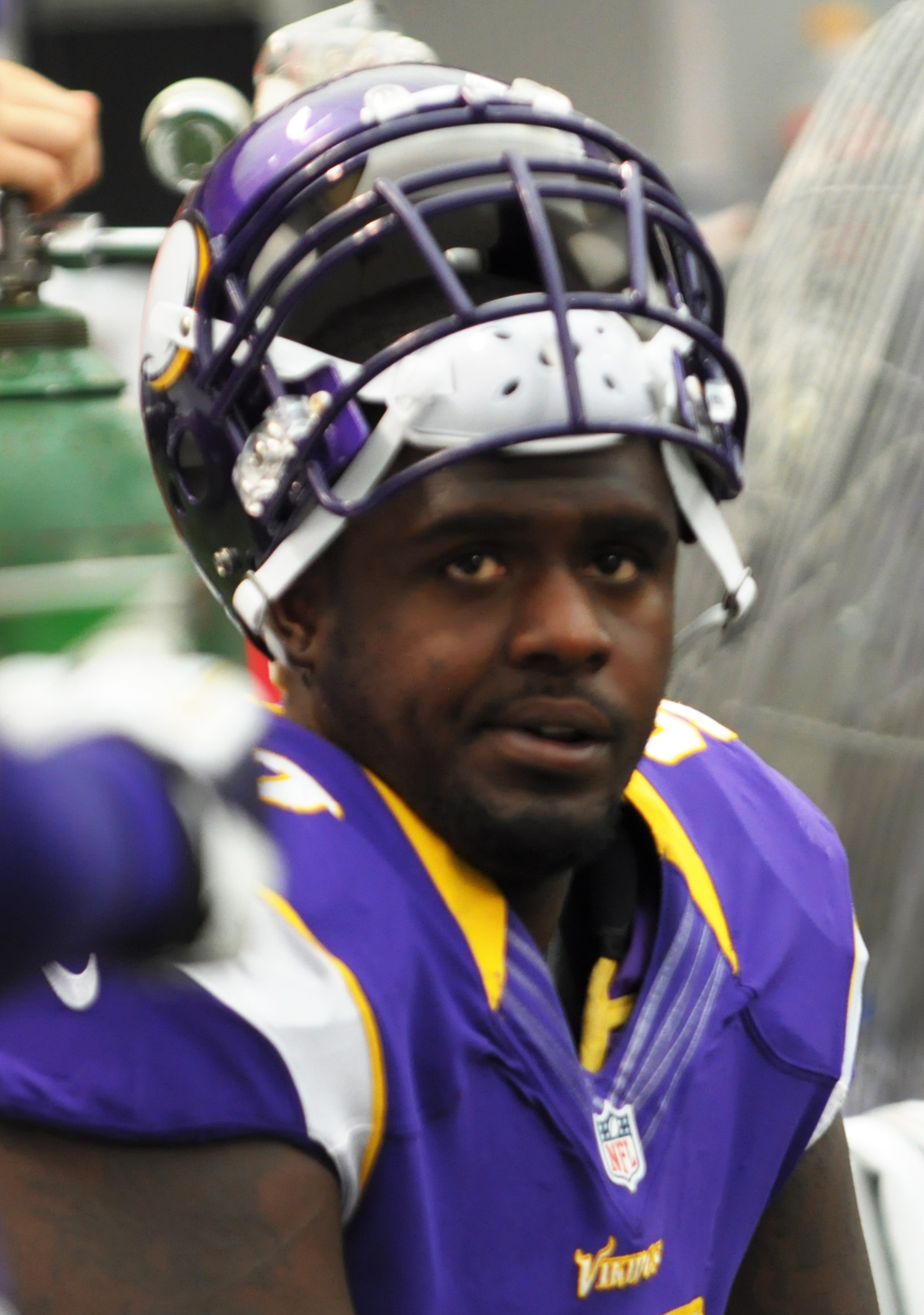
- Evans with the Minnesota Vikings in 2012

No. 62, 90
- Position: Defensive tackle

Personal information
- Born: November 6, 1983 (age 42); Chicago, Illinois, U.S.
- Listed height: 6 ft 4 in (1.93 m)
- Listed weight: 305 lb (138 kg)

Career information
- High school: Morgan Park (Chicago)
- College: Texas State
- NFL draft: 2006: 7th round, 212th overall pick

Career history
- Miami Dolphins (2006); Minnesota Vikings (2007–2013)

Awards and highlights
- First-team All-Southland (2005)

Career NFL statistics
- Total tackles: 100
- Sacks: 3
- Forced fumbles: 1
- Stats at Pro Football Reference

Frederick H. Evans (born November 6, 1983) is an American former professional football player who was a defensive tackle in the National Football League (NFL). He was selected by the Miami Dolphins in the seventh round of the 2006 NFL draft. He played college football at the College of DuPage for two years before transferring to the Texas State Bobcats program.

== Early life ==
Evans was a two-way starting lineman at Chicago's Morgan Park High School, which is generally recognized as one of the top five high schools in the Chicago Public School system. While there he played alongside future NFL linebacker Corey Mays.

== College career ==
=== Dupage ===
Evans played two seasons for the Chaparrals at College of DuPage in Glen Ellyn, Illinois. He earned Second-team All-North Central Community College Conference (N4C) honors as well as All-Region IV at the school known as the Midwest's largest single campus community college. He played on the offensive line as a sophomore after being moved from defensive line where he played his rookie year.

=== Texas State ===
At Texas State University in 2004, Evans was moved back to the defensive line during the first week of spring practices. He registered 33 total tackles for the Bobcats, including 17.5 for losses to account for -61 yards. He had 26 solo stops and 14 assists in his first season for the Bobcats and led the team with 6.5 quarterback sacks for 35 lost yards. He also had a pass breakup and officially was credited with five quarterback hurries. He forced a fumble in the Bobcats' game against Division I-A Florida Atlantic. He was credited with at least a share of a quarterback sack in each of Texas State's first three games. He registered 4.5 tackles, including four solo hits, in the Bobcats' game at Baylor and had two tackles for loss against the Big 12 Conference school, including a quarterback sack and was credited with a quarterback hurry.

As a senior in 2005, Evans earned a First-team All-Southland Conference selection for the second straight year. He registered 55 total tackles, 24 solo stops and 31 assists during the year. He led the Southland Conference with five quarterback sacks for 35 lost yards and 18 tackles for 72 lost yards. He had at least one tackle for loss in the Bobcats' first five games. He participated in the Hula Bowl after the season.

== Professional career ==
Pre-draft measurables
Height	Weight	40-yard dash	20-yard shuttle	Three-cone drill	Vertical jump	Broad jump	Bench press
6 ft 3 7/8 in (1.93 m)	305 lb (138 kg)	5.12 s	4.65 s	7.70 s	35.0 in (0.89 m)	9 ft 1 in (2.77 m)	18 reps
All values from Pro Day

=== Miami Dolphins ===
Evans was selected by the Miami Dolphins in the seventh round (212th overall) of the 2006 NFL draft and signed a four-year contract on July 26, 2006. He had a fairly impressive preseason as a rookie, but was active for only one of the 16 regular season contests. He made his NFL debut in the season finale against the Indianapolis Colts on December 31 and had two tackles.

In the early morning of 2007-06-23 Evans was arrested in Miami Beach. According to the police report, Evans was in a dispute with a taxi driver, and refused to leave the cab at the request of the officers called to the scene. Evans reportedly engaged in a physical struggle with the officers when they tried to handcuff him, with one officer being bitten on his left wrist. The officers then used tasers to subdue Evans. He was charged with battery on a police officer, disorderly conduct, resisting arrest and trespassing. Complicating matters could be the fact that Evans was already on probation in Colorado County, Texas, for possession of marijuana.

In a team-released statement, Dolphins head coach Cam Cameron said: "We are aware that Fred Evans was arrested this morning. We will not condone this type of behavior. I assure everyone it will be dealt with seriously". Cameron made good on his word a few days later, as Evans was waived by the team on June 28.

=== Minnesota Vikings ===
Evans then signed with the Minnesota Vikings. However, he had limited playing time as a backup for the Vikings premier lineman Pat Williams. Evans played in 11 games and finished the year with 3 tackles and 1 sack.

In 2008, Fred Evans played in all 16 games. December 21 in a week sixteen game against the Atlanta Falcons, Evans made his first NFL start due to Williams injuring his shoulder the week before. Evans would go to start the following week and in the wild card playoff game.(where he recovered a fumble after Jared Allen stripped the ball from Donovan McNabb)

A restricted free agent in the 2009 offseason, Evans re-signed with the Vikings on April 6.

On March 13, 2014, Evans re-signed with the Vikings on a one-year deal.

== NFL career statistics ==
Legend
**Bold**	Career high

=== Regular season ===
Year	Team	Games		Tackles					Interceptions					Fumbles			
Year	Team	GP	GS	Cmb	Solo	Ast	Sck	TFL	Int	Yds	TD	Lng	PD	FF	FR	Yds	TD
2006	MIA	1	0	2	2	0	0.0	1	0	0	0	0	0	0	0	0	0
2007	MIN	11	0	3	3	0	1.0	1	0	0	0	0	0	0	0	0	0
2008	MIN	**16**	2	16	6	**10**	0.0	0	0	0	0	0	0	0	0	0	0
2009	MIN	13	0	9	6	3	0.0	0	0	0	0	0	0	0	0	0	0
2010	MIN	8	0	4	4	0	0.0	1	0	0	0	0	0	0	0	0	0
2011	MIN	**16**	0	22	13	9	0.0	3	0	0	0	0	0	0	0	0	0
2012	MIN	**16**	1	**24**	**16**	8	**2.0**	**5**	0	0	0	0	2	0	0	0	0
2013	MIN	14	**3**	20	**16**	4	0.0	3	0	0	0	0	**3**	**1**	0	0	0
		95	6	100	66	34	3.0	14	0	0	0	0	5	1	0	0	0

=== Playoffs ===
Year	Team	Games		Tackles					Interceptions					Fumbles			
Year	Team	GP	GS	Cmb	Solo	Ast	Sck	TFL	Int	Yds	TD	Lng	PD	FF	FR	Yds	TD
2008	MIN	1	**1**	3	2	1	0.0	0	0	0	0	0	0	0	**1**	0	0
2009	MIN	**2**	0	**6**	**6**	0	0.0	**1**	0	0	0	0	0	0	0	0	0
2012	MIN	1	0	**6**	4	**2**	0.0	0	0	0	0	0	0	0	0	0	0
		4	1	15	12	3	0.0	1	0	0	0	0	0	0	1	0	0

== Personal life ==
Evans is a cousin of Los Angeles Angels of Anaheim outfielder Gary Matthews Jr. Evans's sister Aja "Storm" Evans competed on the women's US bobsleigh team at the 2014 Olympic Winter Games in Sochi and at the 2018 Olympic Winter Games in Pyeongchang, South Korea.
