= Chris Chambers =

American football player (born 1978)

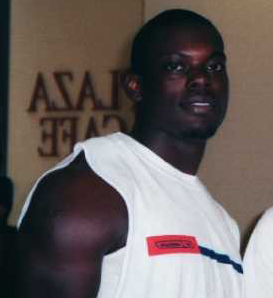
- Chambers in 2002

No. 84
- Position: Wide receiver

Personal information
- Born: August 12, 1978 (age 48); Cleveland, Ohio, U.S.
- Listed height: 5 ft 11 in (1.80 m)
- Listed weight: 210 lb (95 kg)

Career information
- High school: Bedford (Bedford, Ohio)
- College: Wisconsin (1997–2000)
- NFL draft: 2001: 2nd round, 52nd overall pick

Career history

Playing
- Miami Dolphins (2001–2007); San Diego Chargers (2007–2009); Kansas City Chiefs (2009–2010)

Coaching
- Fort Lauderdale (2021) Head coach; Keiser (2022) Wide receivers coach

Awards and highlights
- Pro Bowl (2005); PFWA All-Rookie Team (2001); Second-team All-Big Ten (2000)

Career NFL statistics
- Receptions: 540
- Receiving yards: 7,648
- Receiving touchdowns: 58
- Stats at Pro Football Reference

Christopher J. Chambers (born August 12, 1978) is an American former professional football player who was a wide receiver for ten seasons in the National Football League (NFL). He played college football for the Wisconsin Badgers. He was selected by the Miami Dolphins in the second round of the 2001 NFL draft, and also played for the San Diego Chargers and Kansas City Chiefs.

After his playing career, Chambers served in 2021 as the first-ever University of Fort Lauderdale head football coach.

== Early life ==
Chambers attended Bedford High School in Bedford, Ohio. While there, he was a three-sport letterman in football, basketball and track. In football, he won All-America accolades and was a two-time all-state selection. In basketball, he was a third-team all-state performer as a senior. He was a high school teammate of wide receiver Lee Evans, who also played for the Wisconsin Badgers.

In track, he won the state championship in the 400-meter dash as a senior with a time of 47.1 seconds. He also ran the 200-meter dash in 21.4 seconds.

== College career ==
Following high school, Chambers was a four-year letterman at the University of Wisconsin–Madison. Chambers played in 43 games during his career, starting the final 33. He was also a backup guard on the Badgers basketball team during his freshman year in 1997–98.

Chambers topped the football team in receiving his sophomore season when he totaled 28 catches for 563 yards and seven touchdowns, including an eighty-yard grab against Michigan. He missed two games as a junior with a broken finger, but still led the team in receiving with 41 catches for 578 yards and four scores, and was an honorable mention All-Big Ten selection. Despite playing in only nine games as a senior because of a stress fracture in his right foot, Chambers put together the most productive season of his career with 52 receptions for 813 yards and five touchdowns. He was a second-team All-Big Ten Conference selection. He had the best game of his career when he hauled in 11 passes for 191 yards against Iowa. That game came one week after he had 11 receptions for 173 yards and a touchdown against Purdue.

He finished his collegiate career with 127 receptions for 2,004 yards and 16 touchdowns. He also rushed for 17 yards on two carries, returned one kickoff for 15 yards and fielded five punts for two yards. He currently ranks fourth on the school's all-time list for receptions and yardage, and fifth in receiving touchdowns. He was part of Badger teams that won the Rose Bowl following the 1998 and 1999 seasons.

== Professional career ==
Pre-draft measurables
Height	Weight	Arm length	Hand span	40-yard dash	20-yard shuttle	Vertical jump	Broad jump
5 ft 11 5/8 in (1.82 m)	210 lb (95 kg)	34 in (0.86 m)	9 in (0.23 m)	4.33 s	4.00 s	45.0 in (1.14 m)	11 ft 2 in (3.40 m)
All values from NFL Combine

=== Miami Dolphins ===
==== 2001 ====
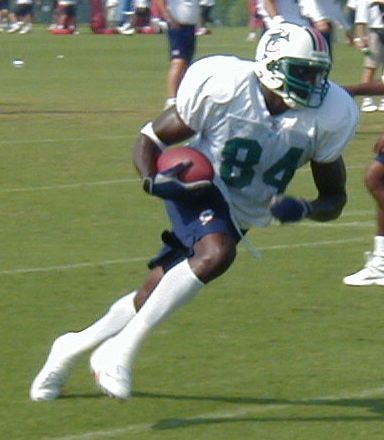
Chambers during his tenure with the Miami Dolphins.

Chambers was drafted by the Miami Dolphins 52nd overall in the second round of the 2001 NFL draft. Chambers turned in one of the most productive seasons of any rookie wide receiver in club history. He started seven of the sixteen games in which he played, and finished with 48 receptions for 883 yards and seven touchdowns. His yardage and touchdown totals both led the team, as did his 18.4-yards per reception average. His reception figure ranked third on the team behind those of fellow receivers Oronde Gadsden and James McKnight. Chambers finished the year ranked 18th in the AFC in receiving yards, while his average per catch was first among the top 20 receivers in both the AFC and NFC. Chambers topped the 100-yard receiving mark three times. He also returned 36 kickoffs for a 22.5-yard average with a long of 47. Chambers missed the team's first-round playoff game on January 13, 2002, against the Baltimore Ravens due to a sprained ankle suffered the last week of the regular season.

==== 2002 ====
In 2002, Chambers started all fifteen games in which he played. He missed the team's October 20 contest against the Buffalo Bills while recovering from a concussion suffered on a hit by then-Denver Broncos safety Kenoy Kennedy. Chambers led team with 52 receptions for 734 yards and also scored three touchdowns. He totaled 78 rushing yards on six carries, including a long run of 45 yards. He had seven catches of 25 yards or longer (second-most on the team), trailing only James McKnight (9). Chambers led the team in receptions five times and in receiving yards on five occasions as well. His rushing total on the year was the fourth-highest single-season total by a Dolphins wide receiver at the time, and it was the highest figure since Nat Moore had 89 yards in 1977.

==== 2003 ====
Chambers started all sixteen games in 2003, becoming the first Dolphins wide receiver to do so since Oronde Gadsden in 2000. He finished the season with 64 catches for 963 yards and 11 touchdowns, leading the team in all three categories. His reception total tied for 14th in the AFC, while his yardage figure ranked seventh. He tied for fifth in the conference in overall touchdowns and was first in the AFC and third in the NFL in receiving scores. Chambers accounted for the most catches by a Dolphin since 1999 when Tony Martin had 67 receptions. Chambers' yardage total was the most by a Dolphin since Martin had 1,037 yards in 1999, and his 11 touchdowns were the most since Mark Clayton hauled in 12 receiving scores in 1991. Of Chambers' 64 receptions, eight went for 25 yards or longer, topping the team. Over the course of the season, he led the team in receptions nine times and in receiving yards on nine occasions. His average per reception of 15.0 tied for the ninth-highest figure among the top 50 receiving yardage leaders in the AFC. He also rushed for 30 yards on four attempts on the year.

==== 2004 ====
Chambers started fifteen games in 2004, missing only an October 3 contest against the New York Jets with a knee injury. He led Miami in both receiving yards and touchdowns with 898 yards and seven scores. His 69 receptions were second on the team only to tight end Randy McMichael's 73. It marked the fourth straight year in which Chambers led the team in receiving yardage, which made him just the third Dolphin ever to achieve this feat, joining Paul Warfield (1970–1973) and Nat Moore (1974–1977). Chambers had six receptions of 25 yards or longer – the most on the team. He also rushed for 76 yards on nine attempts during the course of the season, including a season-long 24-yard run against the Arizona Cardinals on November 7. He led team in receptions seven times and in receiving yards on five occasions during the course of the season. His reception total was 15th in the AFC while his yardage figure ranked 18th. Chambers accounted for four 100-yard receiving games on the year, tied for the sixth-highest single-season figure in club history and the most by a Dolphin since Tony Martin had five in 1999.

==== 2005 ====
In 2005, Chambers started all sixteen games in which he played. He led Miami with 82 receptions for 1,118 yards and 11 touchdowns – figures which earned him his first Pro Bowl selection. His reception total tied for sixth in the AFC and 13th in the NFL, while his yardage figure was third in the conference and 12th in the league. His eleven touchdown catches tied for the second-highest figure in the conference and third in the NFL, trailing only Indianapolis' Marvin Harrison (12) and Carolina's Steve Smith (12). Chambers set career highs for both receptions and receiving yards, while his touchdown total equaled his career best from 2003. Over the final six games of the season, he recorded 43 catches for 620 yards and six touchdowns. With 82 catches on the year, Chambers became the first wide receiver to increase his receiving totals in each of his first five NFL seasons since Muhsin Muhammad did it from 1996 to 2000 with the Carolina Panthers. In addition, Chambers became just the second Dolphins wide receiver to do it, joining O.J. McDuffie (1993–1997). He became the first Dolphin to record 1,000 or more receiving yards since Tony Martin had 1,037 receiving yards in 1999. Overall, it marked the 14th time a Dolphin had a 1,000 receiving yard season, and he is the sixth different Dolphin player to reach that plateau, joining Mark Clayton (five times), Mark Duper (four), Irving Fryar (two), O.J. McDuffie (one) and Tony Martin (one). Chambers also rushed for 92 yards on 12 attempts during the course of the season, good for third on the team in rushing.

Chambers' best game of the season (and his career) came on December 4 against the Buffalo Bills. In the game, which the Dolphins trailed by 20 points entering the fourth quarter, Chambers caught 15 passes for 238 yards and a touchdown. Key receptions included a 57-yard grab on the final drive with under two minutes left, as well as the game-winning touchdown on a pass from Sage Rosenfels with only six seconds remaining. His impressive performance earned him AFC Offensive Player of the Week honors. His yardage total was the highest for any player in the NFL in 2005, and the most by any player since Plaxico Burress had 253 yards for the Pittsburgh Steelers in 2002.

A high school and college teammate, Bills wide receiver Lee Evans, also had a career day during the game with 117 receiving yards and three touchdowns—both personal bests.

==== 2006 ====
Chambers suffered a down season in 2006 after a Pro Bowl performance the year before. The Dolphins' offense struggled as a whole, and he never seemed to be a favorite target for quarterback Joey Harrington, and finished third on the team in both receptions and receiving yards. He also ranked third on the team in rushing with eight rushes for 95 yards. Chambers led the team in receptions four times and in reception yardage four times during a season in which he started all 16 games. He was held without a catch on December 17 at the Buffalo Bills, breaking his streak of making at least one reception in 60 consecutive games.

=== San Diego Chargers ===
==== 2007 ====
Just before the October 16, 2007 NFL trade deadline, the San Diego Chargers acquired wide receiver Chris Chambers from the Miami Dolphins for a 2nd round pick in the upcoming 2008 NFL draft. Signed through 2009, Chambers was reunited with Chargers coach Norv Turner, who was Miami's offensive coordinator in 2002–03. The Chargers hoped that Chambers' experience this season with Dolphins head coach Cam Cameron, whose offense is a derivative of the Norv Turner offense, would help make the transition to the Chargers smoother. The decision to go after Chambers was made after the team realized that receiver Eric Parker's toe injury was not healing fast enough for him to have an impact in 2007 and he was subsequently placed on injured reserve to make room on the roster for Chambers.

The Chargers are responsible for $3.5M of Chambers' $5.4M 2007 salary. Chambers was scheduled to earn $5.1M and $4.55M in 2008 and 2009 respectively.

In Chambers' first games with the Chargers, he caught two passes for 35 yards and a touchdown. On the season, Chambers had 66 receptions for 970 yards and 4 touchdowns. While with the Chargers, Chambers produced 35 receptions, 555 yards, and 4 touchdowns, in addition another 16 catches for 268 yards, and one more score in their three playoff games that year.

==== 2008 ====
As of Week 15 in the 2008 season with the San Diego Chargers, Chambers had 26 receptions for 357 yards with 5 touchdowns, and 1 rushing yard on 1 rushing attempt. Chambers' was inactive in weeks 6 and 7 due to an ankle injury sustained during a game against the Miami Dolphins. Chambers finished the 2008 season with 33 receptions for 462 yards and 5 touchdowns.

==== 2009 ====
Chambers was released by the Chargers on November 2. At the time of his release, Chambers had only 9 receptions for 122 yards with 1 touchdown.

=== Kansas City Chiefs ===
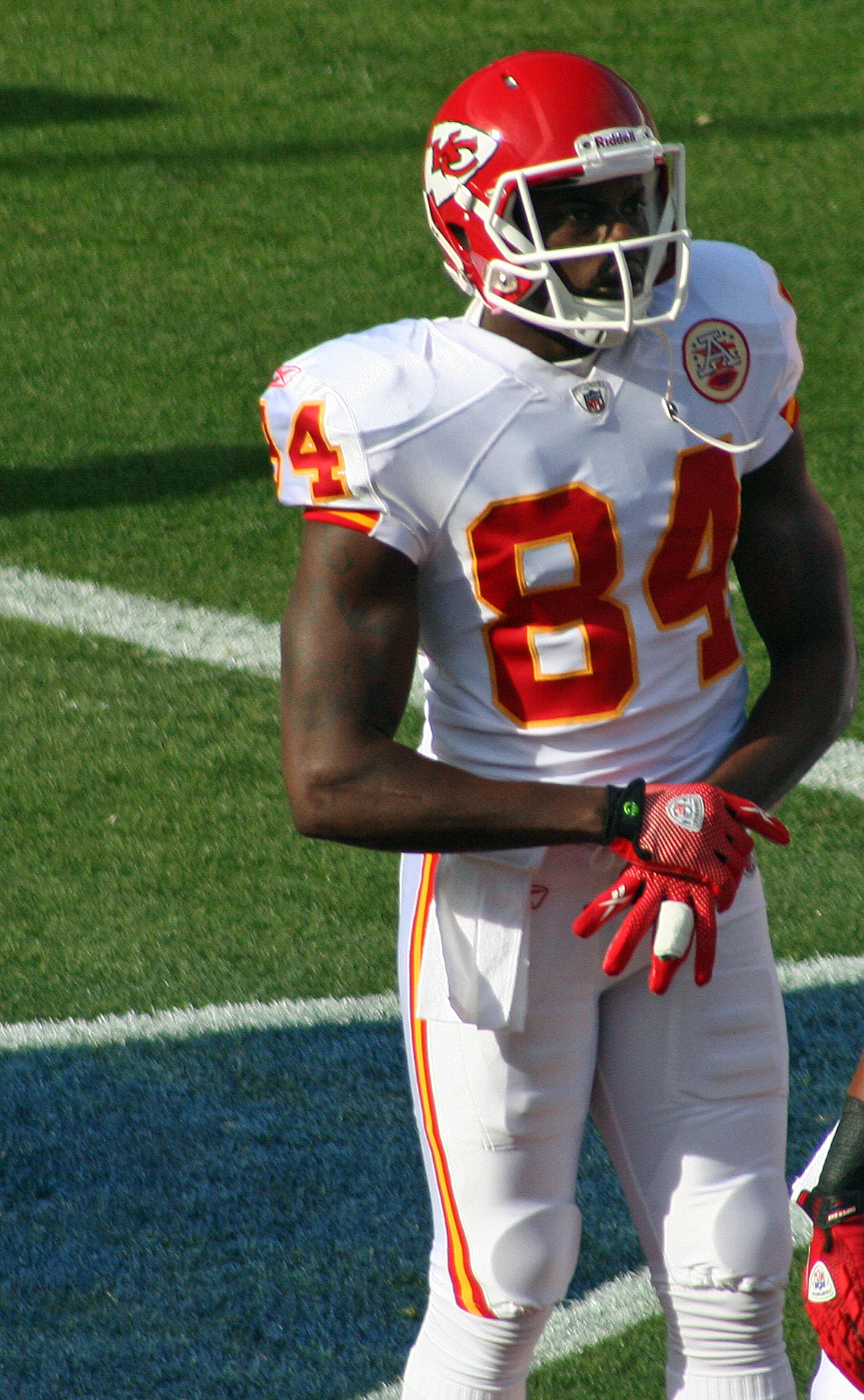
Chambers with the Kansas City Chiefs in 2010

Chambers was claimed off waivers by the Kansas City Chiefs on November 3. He made his Chiefs debut in week 9, catching 3 passes for 70 yards and 2 touchdowns. On November 22, Chambers helped the Chiefs upset the defending Super Bowl Champion Pittsburgh Steelers with 119 receiving yards, including a 61-yard catch and run in overtime that set up the Chiefs' game-winning field goal.

On March 8, 2010, Chambers re-signed a three-year, $15 million contract with the Kansas City Chiefs. He was released on July 28, 2011.

On April 19, 2018, Chambers signed a one-day contract to retire as a member of the Dolphins.

== NFL career statistics ==
Legend
	Led the league
**Bold**	Career high

=== Regular season ===
Year	Team	Games		Receiving					
Year	Team	GP	GS	Tgt	Rec	Yds	Avg	Lng	TD
2001	MIA	**16**	7	90	48	883	**18.4**	74	7
2002	MIA	15	15	100	52	734	14.1	59	3
2003	MIA	**16**	**16**	130	64	963	15.0	57	**11**
2004	MIA	15	15	140	69	898	13.0	76	7
2005	MIA	**16**	**16**	**166**	**82**	**1,118**	13.6	**77**	**11**
2006	MIA	**16**	**16**	154	59	677	11.5	46	4
2007	MIA	6	5	66	31	415	13.4	28	0
2007	SD	10	7	63	35	555	15.9	44	4
2008	SD	14	9	65	33	462	14.0	48	5
2009	SD	7	5	31	9	122	13.6	20	1
2009	KAN	9	9	61	36	608	16.9	61	4
2010	KAN	13	7	43	22	213	9.7	26	1
Career		153	127	1,109	540	7,648	14.2	77	58

=== Playoffs ===
Year	Team	Games		Receiving					
Year	Team	GP	GS	Tgt	Rec	Yds	Avg	Lng	TD
2007	SDG	**3**	**2**	**27**	**16**	**278**	**17.4**	**39**	**1**
2008	SDG	2	0	11	8	129	16.1	25	0
Career		5	2	38	24	407	17.0	39	1

== Coaching career ==
Chambers served in 2021 as the first-ever University of Fort Lauderdale head football coach. He was later the wide receivers coach at Keiser University.

== Personal life ==
Chambers majored in sociology and law at Wisconsin. He did a commercial for Reebok in which he is seen catching three footballs, one with each hand, then caught the third one between the two.

In 2010, Chambers married Stacey Saunders.

== Head coaching record ==
Year	Team	Overall	Conference	Standing	Bowl/playoffs
**Fort Lauderdale Eagles** (National Christian College Athletic Association) (2021)
2021	Fort Lauderdale	0–7	0–0	N/A	
Fort Lauderdale:		0–7	0–0		
Total:		0–7			
