= Joey Harrington =

American football player (born 1978)

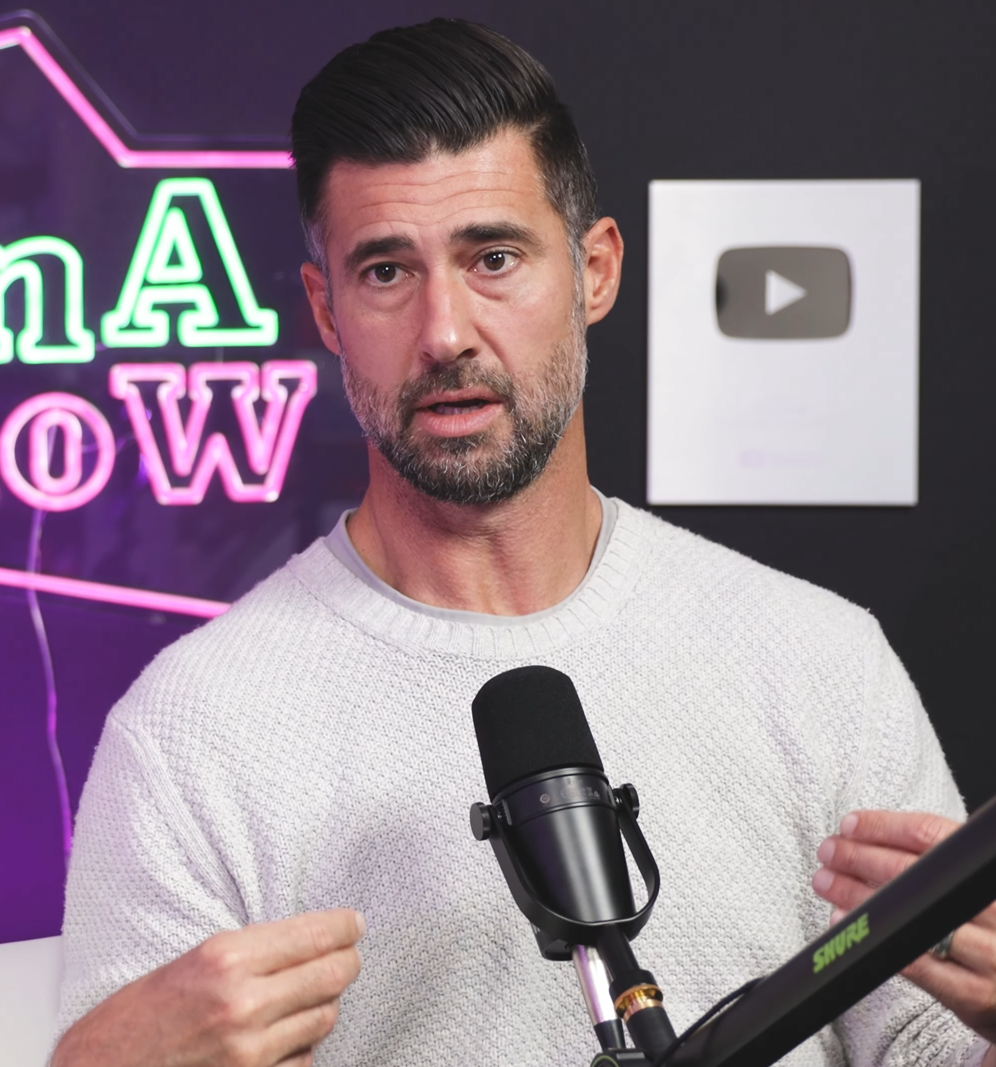
- Harrington in 2023

No. 3, 13
- Position: Quarterback

Personal information
- Born: October 21, 1978 (age 48); Portland, Oregon, U.S.
- Listed height: 6 ft 4 in (1.93 m)
- Listed weight: 210 lb (95 kg)

Career information
- High school: Central Catholic (Portland)
- College: Oregon (1997–2001)
- NFL draft: 2002: 1st round, 3rd overall pick

Career history
- Detroit Lions (2002–2005); Miami Dolphins (2006); Atlanta Falcons (2007); New Orleans Saints (2008)

Awards and highlights
- Pac-10 Offensive Player of the Year (2001); First-team All-Pac-10 (2001); Second-team All-Pac-10 (2000)

Career NFL statistics
- Passing attempts: 2,538
- Passing completions: 1,424
- Completion percentage: 56.1%
- TD–INT: 79–85
- Passing yards: 14,693
- Passer rating: 69.4
- Stats at Pro Football Reference

John Joseph Harrington (born October 21, 1978) is an American former professional football player who was a quarterback in the National Football League (NFL) for seven seasons. He played college football for the Oregon Ducks, winning Pac-10 Offensive Player of the Year in 2001. Harrington was selected third overall by the Detroit Lions in the 2002 NFL draft, but his tenure lasted only four seasons due to inconsistent play. He spent his final three seasons as the primary starter for the Miami Dolphins and Atlanta Falcons and as a backup with the New Orleans Saints.

== Early life ==
Harrington was born and raised in Portland, Oregon. He graduated from Central Catholic High School in Portland, and finished his high school career with more than 4,200 yards and 50 touchdowns rushing and passing.

Harrington's grandfather and father played quarterback for the Universities of Portland and Oregon, respectively, and upon hearing of Joey's birth, legendary Oregon Ducks' coach Len Casanova jokingly sent his parents a letter-of-intent.

== College career ==
Harrington is a graduate of the University of Oregon, and was a three-year starter on the Oregon Ducks football team. In his senior season at Oregon, he threw for 2,415 yards and 23 touchdowns, and he finished his college career with a 25–3 record (including bowl wins against #12 Texas and #3 Colorado), 512 completions in 928 attempts (55.2%), 6,911 passing yards, 59 touchdowns, 23 interceptions, and 210 rushing yards and 18 scores on 145 carries. A business administration major with a 3.23 GPA (twice earning honors with a 3.34 GPA), Harrington's 7,121 yards of total offense rank sixth in University of Oregon history.

Harrington finished fourth in the voting for the Heisman Trophy in 2001, following a campaign for the award that included a billboard in Times Square promoting him as "Joey Heisman." He earned numerous honors, including first-team All-American, Pac-10 Offensive Player of the Year, and second-team honors from The Sporting News. He was one of five finalists for the Johnny Unitas Golden Arm Award in 2001. EA Sports selected him for the cover of the 2003 edition of their NCAA Football video game series. Harrington was given the nickname "Captain Comeback" among fans for his ability to lead Oregon to victory in late game situations, accumulating a record of 11–2 in games in which the Ducks trailed or were tied in the fourth quarter.

== Professional career ==
Pre-draft measurables
Height	Weight	Arm length	Hand span	40-yard dash	10-yard split	20-yard split	20-yard shuttle	Three-cone drill	Vertical jump	Broad jump	Wonderlic
6 ft 4 in (1.93 m)	215 lb (98 kg)	31 1/2 in (0.80 m)	9 3/4 in (0.25 m)	4.80 s	1.65 s	2.84 s	4.21 s	7.00 s	32.0 in (0.81 m)	9 ft 4 in (2.84 m)	32
All values from NFL Combine

=== Detroit Lions ===
==== 2002 season: Rookie year ====
Harrington was selected by the Detroit Lions with the third pick overall in the 2002 NFL draft and signed his contract in mid-July. He was cited by head coach Marty Mornhinweg as the quarterback of the future, though wasn't ready to name him the starting quarterback, instead placing him behind starter Mike McMahon and backup Ty Detmer. Harrington debuted in a Week 1 blowout loss versus the Miami Dolphins, completing 4 out of 11 passes for 41 yards. After Week 2, Harrington was named the starter ahead of McMahon. Making his first start in the Week 3 matchup and opening debut of Ford Field versus the Green Bay Packers, Harrington threw for 182 yards and two touchdowns to four interceptions. Down 17 late, the Lions rallied back with two touchdowns, including a 52-yard touchdown pass from Harrington to pull within 3. Harrington had a chance for a game-winning drive with 1:03 left before throwing an interception to seal the loss. Harrington got his first NFL victory with a 26–21 win over the New Orleans Saints, throwing for 267 yards and a touchdown with no turnovers or sacks. In Week 6 versus the Minnesota Vikings, the Lions were down 24–31 and at Minnesota's 8-yard line. However, Harrington threw a pass into the endzone that was picked off, leading to a Lions loss. In the Week 15 game versus the Tampa Bay Buccaneers, Harrington was taken out due to an irregular heartbeat, leading him to miss the final two games of the season. He underwent a procedure to fix the irregular heartbeat a day later. In fourteen games played, Harrington finished his rookie season passing for 2,294 yards, 12 touchdowns, and 16 interceptions while completing just over 50% of his passes, and a 3–9 record.

==== 2003 season: Sophomore season, league-leading interceptions ====
In the season-opener, Harrington threw for 195 yards, four touchdowns, and no interceptions to defeat the Arizona Cardinals 42–24. However, the Lions proceeded to go on a six-game losing streak as Harrington threw for 12 interceptions to 4 touchdowns in that time. In the Week 12 game versus the Minnesota Vikings, Harrington threw for 167 yards, 1 touchdown, and 4 interceptions, including two back-to-back pick-6's to fall 14–24. In the season-finale, the Lions upset the one-seeded St. Louis Rams as Harrington threw for 238 yards, 3 touchdowns and an interception in the 30–20 win. Harrington finished his season throwing for 2,880 yards, 17 touchdowns, and a league-leading 22 interceptions.

==== 2004 season ====
Facing the David Carr-led Houston Texans in Week 2, Harrington tossed for 176 yards, three touchdowns, and one interception while leading the Lions to their first 2–0 start since the 2000 season. In Week 7, Harrington threw for 230 yards and 2 touchdowns while leading the Lions to a 28–13 win and a 4–2 record. However, the Lions would go on another losing streak, losing five-straight before their next win in Week 13 against the Arizona Cardinals where Harrington threw for 196 yards, 1 touchdown, and 1 interception in the 26–12 win. In the week before, Harrington was benched in the second half for McMahon after throwing for 156 yards in a blowout 9–41 loss against the Indianapolis Colts. In Week 14 against the Green Bay Packers, Harrington completed 5 of 22 passes for 47 yards as the Lions gave up a 13–0 lead. Lions head coach Steve Mariucci was hesitant to name a starter for the next game, but stuck with Harrington. Harrington finished his season with a career-high 3,047 yards, 19 touchdowns, and 12 interceptions while completing 56% of his passes as the Lions went 6–10.

==== 2005 season: Quarterback competition and final season in Detroit ====
In the offseason prior to the 2005 season, Lions signed veteran quarterback Jeff Garcia, who was seen as an immediate competitor for the starting quarterback role. However, Garcia broke his fibula in the preseason, putting Harrington firmly in the starting quarterback position. In the season opener versus the Green Bay Packers, Harrington threw for 167 yards and two touchdowns in a 17–3 victory. In the next week versus the Chicago Bears, he threw for 196 yards, one touchdown, and five interceptions in the 6–38 blowout loss. He passed for 2,021 yards, 12 touchdowns, and 12 interceptions as the Lions went 5–11.

=== Miami Dolphins ===
After the 2005 season, Detroit signed free agents Jon Kitna and Josh McCown, and traded Harrington to the Miami Dolphins on May 12, 2006, for a fifth-round draft pick in 2007, after meeting performance stipulations in Miami (the pick was later traded to the New Orleans Saints). Harrington started the 2006 season as a backup behind new Dolphins quarterback Daunte Culpepper. During his tenure with the Lions, Harrington started 55 games and had a record of 18 wins and 37 losses.

In 2006, Harrington did not play in the Dolphins' first four games, backing up Culpepper. Culpepper injured his shoulder prior to Miami's fifth game against the New England Patriots, forcing Harrington into the starting role. Harrington lost his first three starts, before leading Miami to a 31–13 win over the previously unbeaten (7–0 at the time) Chicago Bears. Harrington followed that game with four consecutive victories. Harrington capped off this winning streak in front of a national television audience on Thanksgiving Day in Detroit with a 27–10 victory at Ford Field against his former team. Harrington passed for 3 touchdowns and 213 yards against Detroit, compiling a passer rating of 107.4, his highest single game rating for 2006. Harrington struggled after the Lions' game. Against the Buffalo Bills in Week 15, Harrington went 5-for-17 for 20 yards, throwing two interceptions. His passer rating for the game was 0.0, the minimum possible under the complex NFL formula. Harrington was pulled midway through Miami's next game against the New York Jets, replaced in the 13–10 Christmas night loss by Cleo Lemon. Harrington did not appear in Miami's Week 17 finale against the Indianapolis Colts. Overall, Harrington played in and started eleven games, leading Miami to a 5–6 record (Miami finished 6–10 for the season as a whole).

=== Atlanta Falcons ===
On April 9, 2007, Harrington agreed to a two-year, $6 million contract with the Atlanta Falcons to compete with D. J. Shockley and Chris Redman to be the backup quarterback to Michael Vick.

Harrington was elevated to starting quarterback after the suspension of Vick for the 2007 NFL season. Harrington performed well in the preseason, but after going 0–2, Atlanta signed quarterback Byron Leftwich as a possible replacement for Harrington. During the Week 3 Atlanta home opener against the division rival Carolina Panthers, Harrington completed 31-of-44 passes with two touchdowns and no interceptions for a 110.1 passer rating in a 27–20 loss. In Week 4 against the Houtson Texans, Harrington improved on his numbers with a 121.7 passer rating, completing 23-of-29 passes for two touchdowns with no interceptions, leading the Falcons to their first win of the 2007 season. In the 2007 season, he passed for 2,215 yards, seven touchdowns, and eight interceptions in 12 games as the Falcons went 4–12.

On March 5, 2008, the Falcons released Harrington in a salary cap move. He was re-signed by the team seven days later but was again released in August after the Falcons completed their preseason schedule.

=== New Orleans Saints ===
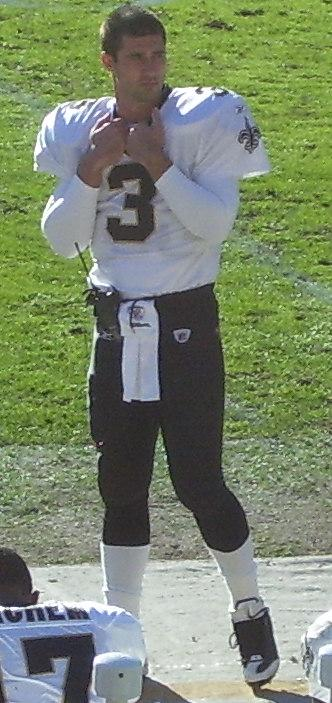
Harrington with the New Orleans Saints in 2008

Harrington signed with the New Orleans Saints on September 19, 2008. He was the third-string quarterback behind Drew Brees and Mark Brunell for one game against the Denver Broncos. He was released only five days later on September 24, 2008, due to increasing injuries on the Saints roster. After the Saints' injury situation became more manageable, Harrington was re-signed on September 30, but was cut again on October 6. He once again re-signed with the Saints on October 12, 2008, as an inactive third-string quarterback.

On March 30, 2009, Harrington was re-signed to a one-year deal by the Saints. He was released by the team again on September 5, 2009.

After being cut by the Saints, Harrington would not sign with another NFL team.

=== Performance assessment ===
Harrington was first given the label of "Savior" by fans and media in Detroit - then deemed a "bust" when he did not meet high expectations. Many speculate that his premature start in the NFL, along with lack of surrounding talent, poor coaching, and questionable offensive lines have affected his performance severely. Many other quarterbacks, such as Tim Couch and David Carr, were also drafted highly and eventually lost their starting jobs.

In 2005, former quarterback Troy Aikman wrote that Harrington "can still be a really good quarterback in this league," and does not deserve the blame for what happened in Detroit: "The focus on Joey's play has given every other player a hall pass, and that's not right."

Former quarterback Phil Simms said in 2006 that Harrington got a bad rap in Detroit. "I am not a Joey Harrington basher. The quarterback can't overcome bad coaching and bad players." Former quarterback Dan Marino said that he did not believe that Harrington had the necessary pieces around him in Detroit to be successful, but that he might be okay in a different place.

When Lions head coach Steve Mariucci was fired by general manager Matt Millen, Lions cornerback Dré Bly told the Detroit Free Press that he blamed Harrington for the dismissal of Mariucci. Bly later apologized to the Lions, but not to Harrington directly.

Some fingers were also pointed at the Lions' management and coaching staff. Fellow Lions quarterback Jeff Garcia publicly questioned the team's front office, saying on WXYT that "You start to question whether the organization has the people in place who can go about making the proper selections." Former defensive end Howie Long said that Millen made a mistake by drafting Harrington, along with signing Garcia instead of Brad Johnson.

== Career statistics ==
=== NFL ===
Year	Team	Games		Passing							
Year	Team	GP	GS	Cmp	Att	Pct	Yds	Avg	TD	Int	Rtg
2002	DET	14	12	215	429	50.1	2,294	5.3	12	16	59.9
2003	DET	16	16	309	554	55.8	2,880	5.2	17	22	63.9
2004	DET	16	16	274	489	56.0	3,047	6.2	19	12	77.5
2005	DET	12	11	188	330	57.0	2,021	6.1	12	12	72.0
2006	MIA	11	11	223	388	57.5	2,236	5.8	12	15	68.2
2007	ATL	12	10	215	348	61.8	2,215	6.4	7	8	77.2
2008	NO	0	0	DNP							
Career		81	76	1,424	2,538	56.1	14,693	5.8	79	85	69.4

=== College ===
Season	Team	Games			Passing								Rushing			
Season	Team	GP	GS	Record	Cmp	Att	Pct	Yds	Avg	TD	Int	Rate	Att	Yds	Avg	TD
1998	Oregon	2	0	—	0	1	0.0	0	0.0	0	0	0.0	0	0	0.0	0
1999	Oregon	7	4	4–0	64	115	55.7	948	8.2	9	3	145.5	18	39	2.2	2
2000	Oregon	11	11	9–2	195	375	52.0	2,694	7.2	20	13	123.0	61	125	2.0	6
2001	Oregon	11	11	10–1	186	322	57.8	2,415	7.5	23	5	141.2	55	56	1.0	7
Totals		31	26	23–3	445	813	54.7	6,057	7.5	52	21	133.3	134	220	1.6	15

== Awards and honors ==
NFL

- FedEx Air Player of the Week – Week 1, 2003

College

- Pac-10 Offensive Player of the Year (2001)
- First-team All-Pac-10 (2001)
- Second-team All-Pac-10 (2000)

Other honors

- Oregon Sports Hall of Fame

== Personal life ==
Harrington married Emily Hatten on March 10, 2007. They have two sons, born in 2009 and 2012. Emily is a nurse practitioner, and Harrington spoke about them opening a medical clinic to serve the homeless in Portland, after he retired from football. Harrington is an accomplished jazz pianist who has occasionally performed with artists such as Jason Mraz, Blues Traveler, and Third Eye Blind. On February 1, 2008, Harrington appeared as a guest chef on a special Super Bowl episode of The Rachael Ray Show. Harrington is a distant cousin of professional golfer Pádraig Harrington and professional poker player Dan Harrington. Harrington's brother, Michael, played football at the University of Idaho, and was also a quarterback.

Harrington was the guest on the February 2, 2008, episode of NPR's Wait, Wait...Don't Tell Me!, in the 'Not My Job' segment.

Harrington and his family moved back to Portland after his release from the Saints in September 2009. He is spending more time with his wife and family, and the numerous charities in which he is involved. He co-owned the Pearl Tavern, a restaurant in Portland's Pearl District, which opened in 2016 and closed in 2018.

On July 31, 2011, Harrington was struck by an SUV while riding his bicycle in Portland, Oregon. Harrington suffered a broken collarbone, a punctured lung, and fractured his first two ribs below his collarbone. He also got six staples in his head behind his right ear due to the accident.

=== Broadcasting ===
In 2009, Harrington worked as an NFL and college football commentator for Fox Sports Radio. In 2010, he served as a color analyst for Oregon Ducks football games on Oregon Sports Network. Currently, Harrington is a college football analyst for Fox College Football on FX and Fox. He is also a general assignment reporter with KGW Television on a part-time basis in Portland, Oregon.

=== Philanthropy ===
Harrington established the Harrington Family Foundation in 2003 as a nonprofit organization with the goal of supporting youth education and activities as well as other miscellaneous benefits. Harrington's parents, John and Valerie Harrington, run the foundation.

The foundation began with a portion of Joey's signing bonus with the Detroit Lions. It raises further money by selling memorabilia items and booking events. After being given the New York Times Square "Joey Heisman" billboard by the former Oregon Ducks Athletic Director Bill Moos, he proceeded to cut it up and sell the pieces for charity. All the proceeds from the sales went toward scholarships for the University of Oregon.

== See also ==
- O (gesture), a hand signal popularized by Harrington
