= Cleo Lemon =

American gridiron football player and coach (born 1979)

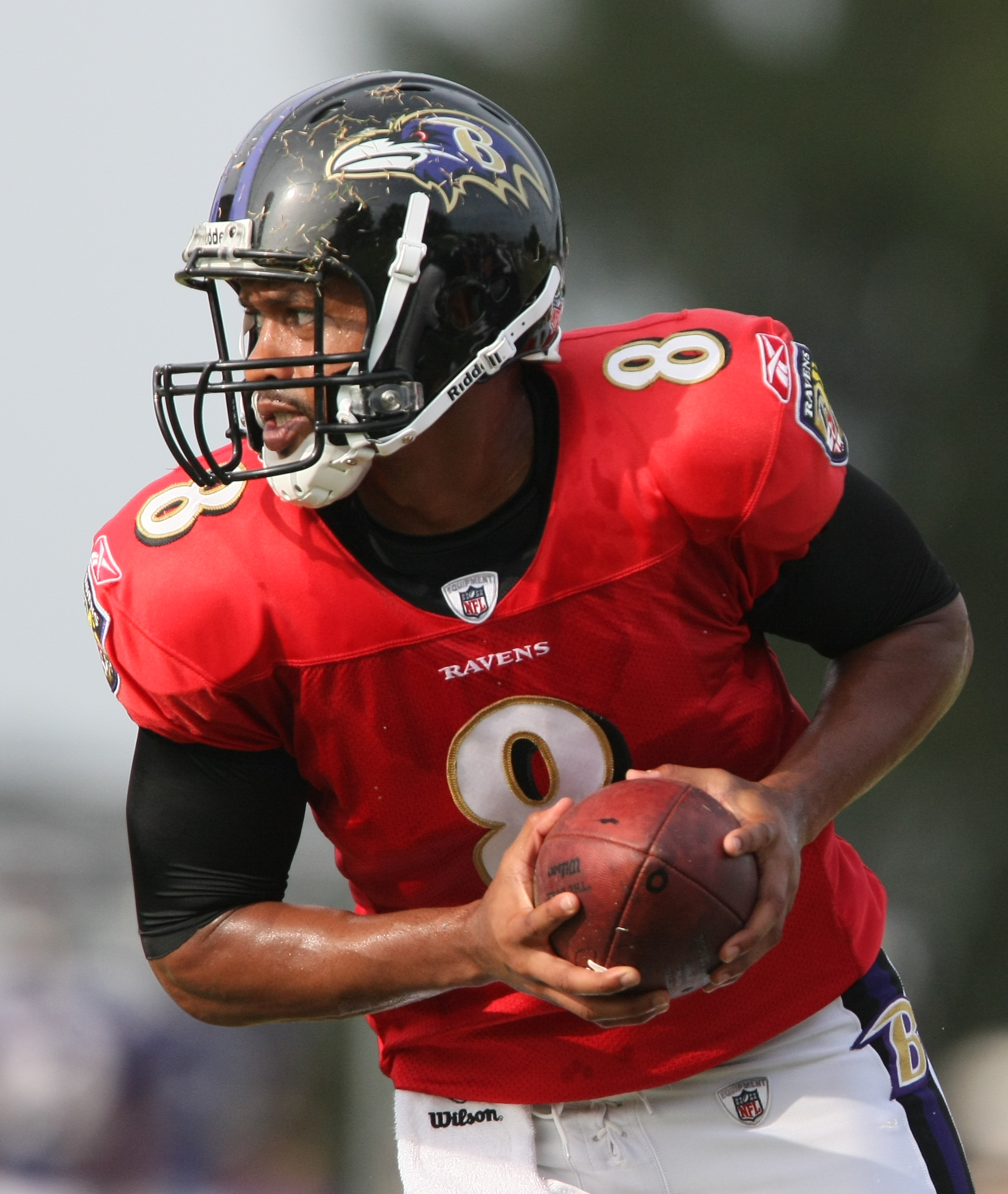
- Lemon at Baltimore Ravens training camp in 2009

Personal information
- Born: August 16, 1979 (age 47); Greenwood, Mississippi, U.S.
- Listed height: 6 ft 2 in (1.88 m)
- Listed weight: 215 lb (98 kg)

Career information
- High school: Greenwood
- College: Arkansas State (1997–2000)
- NFL draft: 2001: undrafted

Career history

Playing
- Green Bay Packers (2001)*; Baltimore Ravens (2002)*; Memphis Xplorers (2003); San Diego Chargers (2003–2005); Miami Dolphins (2005–2007); Jacksonville Jaguars (2008); Baltimore Ravens (2009)*; Toronto Argonauts (2010–2011)
- * Offseason or practice squad member only

Coaching
- First Coast HS (FL) (2013–2015) Offensive coordinator; Pittsburgh Steelers (2015) Coaching intern; Findlay (2015) Wide receivers coach; Dallas Cowboys (2016) Coaching intern; Pearl River (2016–2017) Offensive coordinator; Jacksonville State (2017–2020) Wide receivers coach; New Orleans Saints (2019) Coaching intern

Career NFL statistics
- Passing attempts: 379
- Passing completions: 211
- Completion percentage: 55.7%
- TD–INT: 8–7
- Passing yards: 2,185
- Passer rating: 71.8
- Stats at Pro Football Reference

Career CFL statistics
- TD–INT: 22–23
- Passing yards: 5,069
- Passer rating: 82.5
- Stats at CFL.ca (archived)

Cleo Lemon Jr. (born August 16, 1979) is an American former professional football player who was a quarterback in the National Football League (NFL) and Canadian Football League (CFL). He played college football for the Arkansas State Red Wolves. Lemon was signed by the Green Bay Packers as an undrafted free agent in 2001. He was also a member of the San Diego Chargers, Miami Dolphins, Jacksonville Jaguars, Baltimore Ravens, and Toronto Argonauts.

== Professional career ==
=== Memphis Xplorers ===
In February 2003, Lemon signed with the af2's Memphis Xplorers.

=== San Diego Chargers ===
Lemon was signed by the San Diego Chargers on April 4, 2003. He was waived prior to the start of the season, then re-signed to the Chargers' practice squad where he spent the entire 2003 season.

Lemon was re-signed by the Chargers on January 12, 2004. In preseason, Lemon completed 17 of 27 passes (63.0%) for 178 yards and one interception. After a contract holdout by Philip Rivers forced the first-round pick to miss most of training camp, Lemon was able to make the team as the No. 3 quarterback behind Drew Brees and Doug Flutie. He was inactive for all 16 regular season games and Wild Card playoff contest.

In the 2005 preseason with San Diego, Lemon completed 34 of 49 passes (69.4%) for 369 yards with three touchdowns, no interceptions and a passer rating of 111.7. He served as the team's third-string quarterback until October 18, 2005, when he was traded to the Miami Dolphins in exchange for quarterback A. J. Feeley and a sixth-round draft choice in 2006.

=== Miami Dolphins ===
Lemon was inactive as the third quarterback for all 11 games with the Dolphins in 2005.

In the 2006 preseason, Lemon was 42–59 for 450 yards with two touchdowns and no interceptions for a rating of 104.5. In his start on August 31 against the St. Louis Rams, he was 21–27 for 271 yards with one touchdown and no interceptions for a rating of 120.8. Lemon served as the third-string quarterback for the first four games of 2006, and became the primary backup after Daunte Culpepper became inactive starting Week 5.

On December 17 in a game against the Buffalo Bills, Lemon replaced starter Joey Harrington and threw for 98 yards on 9 of 16 passing with no touchdowns and no interceptions. While Harrington started the following week, Lemon replaced him at halftime eight days later versus the New York Jets. He finished the game 11 of 16 passing for 104 yards (68.8%) and one touchdown, earning a 107.3 passer rating. However, he could not lead the Dolphins to victory as the Jets won on a last-minute field goal.

After a career as a backup, Lemon started the first regular season game of his career in the season finale against the Indianapolis Colts on December 31. Lemon played fairly well against the eventual Super Bowl champions, completing 18 of 36 passes for 210 yards, a touchdown and an interception. He also led the team to 10 fourth-quarter points as the Dolphins fell just short, losing 27–22.

Lemon, who was a restricted free agent in the 2007 offseason, was tendered a one-year, $1.3 million contract by the Dolphins on March 3. He signed the tender on May 29. New head coach Cam Cameron was offensive coordinator for the Chargers during Lemon's entire tenure there.

With Joey Harrington moving on to the Atlanta Falcons, Lemon became backup to the newly acquired Trent Green. With an injury to Green in Week 5, Lemon was named the starter for the Dolphins' away game against Cleveland. After shaking off some early rust, Lemon led the Dolphins to near victory against the Browns with several successful drives (including a drive where the Dolphins lost 20 yards on penalties that was capped with a 4th and 1 touchdown). Showing amazing determination, Lemon brought victory within their grasp, with his two touchdown rushes, two touchdown passes, and an impressive 107.3 QB rating, but the Dolphins' defense could not stop the Browns. His next start was in Miami's 49–28 loss to New England, going 24 for 37, with 1 rushing touchdown and 236 passing yards. But in Week 11, Lemon was replaced by rookie quarterback John Beck. Lemon was renamed the Dolphins' starting Quarterback in Week 15 against the Ravens. He threw a game-winning touchdown to Greg Camarillo in overtime to beat Baltimore, 22–16, giving Miami their first (and only) win of the season.

=== Jacksonville Jaguars ===
On February 29, 2008, Lemon signed with the Jacksonville Jaguars. The three-year deal was worth just under $9 million. He played in only two games and missed in both pass attempts in his first season with the Jaguars.

He was released on June 17, 2009, after struggling to pick up the Jaguars' system.

=== Baltimore Ravens (second stint) ===
After originally joining the Baltimore Ravens as a street free agent in 2002, Lemon re-signed with Baltimore on August 16, 2009. The move reunited him with Ravens offensive coordinator Cam Cameron, whom Lemon had previously played for with both the San Diego Chargers and Miami Dolphins. He was waived on September 1 because of family issues.

=== Toronto Argonauts ===
On March 17, 2010, Lemon signed with the Toronto Argonauts. On June 22, Lemon was named the starting quarterback of the Argonauts.

With him at the helm, Toronto returned to the playoffs in 2010 after a three-year absence with a 9–9 record, though his individual stats were not overly impressive.

On September 6, 2011, Lemon was released by the Argonauts after the team went just 2–6 with him under center up to that point in the 2011 season.

== Career statistics ==
Cleo Lemon CFL and NFL career statistics
Year	Team	Games		Passing								Rushing				Fumbles	
Year	Team	GP	GS	Cmp	Att	Pct	Yds	Avg	TD	Int	Rtg	Att	Yds	Avg	TD	Fum	Lost
2006	MIA	4	1	38	68	55.9	412	6.1	2	1	77.6	3	7	2.3	0	0	0
2007	MIA	9	7	173	309	56.0	1,773	5.7	6	6	71.0	31	102	3.3	4	7	3
2008	JAX	2	0	0	2	0.0	0	0.0	0	0	39.6	2	−3	−1.5	0	0	0
2010	TOR	17	17	285	462	61.7	3,433	7.4	15	19	78.1	39	274	7.0	2	13	—
2011	TOR	8	8	145	218	66.5	1,636	7.5	7	4	91.8	12	102	8.5	2	4	—
NFL totals		15	8	211	379	55.7	2,185	5.8	8	7	71.8	36	106	2.9	4	7	3
CFL totals		25	25	430	680	63.2	5,069	7.5	22	23	82.5	51	376	7.4	4	17	—

== Personal life ==
His father, Cleo Lemon Sr. served as his high school football coach.
