= Glenn Pires =

American football coach (born 1958)

Personal information
- Born: 1958 (age 67–68); New Bedford, Massachusetts

Career information
- High school: New Bedford (New Bedford, Massachusetts)
- College: Springfield (MA)

Career history
- Melrose HS (MA) (1981–1982) Assistant coach; Syracuse (1983–1984) Assistant coach; Dartmouth (1985–1988) Assistant coach; Syracuse (1989–1994) Assistant coach; Michigan State (1995) Assistant coach; Arizona Cardinals (1996–2000) Assistant linebackers coach; Detroit Lions (2001–2002) Assistant linebackers coach; Miami Dolphins (2003–2007) Linebackers coach; Atlanta Falcons (2008–2014) Linebackers coach; Chicago Bears (2015–2018) Linebackers coach

Glenn M. Pires (born 1958) is an American football coach.

== Early life ==
Pires was born and raised in New Bedford, Massachusetts. He attended school locally, where he became a three-year letter winner in both football and track. He also played in the football team as an offensive guard and linebacker and was selected for several postseason all-star teams. He later played football for Springfield College, where he became a two-year NCAA Division II All-ECAC and All-New England selection.

In the track and field teams at New Bedford High and Springfield College, Pires mostly competed in the field events. He was a Southeastern Massachusetts Conference champion in both the shot put and discus in addition to being a Class A and All State finalist in the discus. His throw of 170–9 remains a New Bedford record. In 1979, he was the Division 2 National Champion in the 35-pound weight hammer throw. Based on these achievements, Pires (as a member of the class of 1976) was inducted into the New Bedford High School Hall of Fame on May 11, 2002.

== Coaching career ==
Pires's first coaching role came as an assistant at Melrose High School. He then returned to his former high school at New Bedford, becoming an assistant to his former coach, Bruce MacPherson. Pires then gained collegiate positions at Syracuse University, Dartmouth College and Michigan State University.

In 1996, he moved from College football to the National Football League (NFL) when he became an assistant linebackers coach with the Arizona Cardinals until 2000. He later praised the work he conducted with Ronald McKinnon, who was undrafted and unsigned, but Pires took pride in enabling the player to perform for ten years in the NFL. When he joined the Detroit Lions immediately afterwards, Pires remained in the same position he had undertaken for the Cardinals.

When he moved to work with the Miami Dolphins for five years, initially as an assistant defensive line coach for two seasons, then as a defensive quality control coach, before becoming the assistant linebacker coach in 2007. He then moved to work with the Atlanta Falcons over the next seven years as the linebacker coach. In 2014, with the support of Pires, Paul Worrilow was ranked fifth in the NFL for tackles with 142.

Pires joined the Chicago Bears in 2015, saying "The tradition of this team is always something that's been very appealing to any coach, especially me, the Midwest and the Chicago Bears, that's where it's at. The tradition of linebackers for the Chicago Bears, the tradition of what they've upheld in the history of the NFL, that's a great challenge I'm looking forward to [maintaining]." He was not retained by the Bears after the 2018 season as defensive coordinator Vic Fangio departed the team.

== Personal life ==
Pires' family came from Cape Verde, through his maternal grandmother.
