= Travis Jones (American football coach) =

American football player and coach (born 1972)

Personal information
- Born: June 6, 1972 (age 54); Irwinton, Georgia, U.S.
- Listed height: 6 ft 3 in (1.91 m)
- Listed weight: 255 lb (116 kg)

Career information
- High school: Wilkinson County (GA)
- College: Georgia

Career history

Playing
- Baltimore Stallions (1995); Florida Bobcats (1996)

Coaching
- Georgia (1997) Graduate assistant; Appalachian State (1998–2000) Linebackers coach; Kansas (2001–2002) Defensive line coach; LSU (2003–2004) Defensive line coach; Miami Dolphins (2005) Assistant defensive line coach; Miami Dolphins (2006) Linebackers coach; Miami Dolphins (2007) Defensive ends coach; New Orleans Saints (2008–2012) Assistant defensive line coach; Seattle Seahawks (2013–2016) Defensive line coach; Seattle Seahawks (2017) Senior defensive assistant; Atlanta Falcons (2018–2019) Assistant defensive line coach

Awards and highlights
- 2× Super Bowl champion (XLIV, XLVIII); BCS national champion (2003)
- Stats at ArenaFan.com

Travis Jones (born June 6, 1972) is an American former football player and coach. He played college football for the Georgia Bulldogs from 1990 to 1992 and 1994 and professional football for the Baltimore Stallions of the Canadian Football League in 1995 and the Florida Bobcats of the Arena Football League in 1996. In a coaching career of more than 20 years, he was a member of Nick Saban's staff at LSU that led the 2003 team to the national championship. He was also an assistant coach on teams that won Super Bowl championships, first with the 2009 New Orleans Saints and later with the 2013 Seattle Seahawks. He was most recently an assistant coach for the Atlanta Falcons of the National Football League (NFL).

== Playing career ==
Jones played college football as a linebacker and later defensive tackle for the Georgia Bulldogs from 1990 to 1992 and 1994. He played for the 1992 Georgia team that recorded a 10–2 record and a No. 8 ranking. In the 1993 Citrus Bowl, he recovered a fumble from Ohio State quarterback Kirk Herbstreit in the fourth quarter to set up the winning score.

Jones was regarded as Georgia's best defensive lineman coming into the 1993 season. However, in August 1993, he was hospitalized with rhabdonmyolysis, a condition that results in the secretion of more waste than the kidneys can handle. Because the condition was exacerbated by exercise, some recommended that Jones retire from playing football. In mid-September, Jones announced his intention to return to the team. However, the team doctor opposed the comeback, and Jones was redshirted for the 1993 season. In October 1993, he was named to the College Football Association's Good Works Team for his work with Special Olympics and a local homeless shelter.

Jones made a comeback with Georgia in 1994.

After graduating from Georgia, Jones played two years of professional football. He spent the 1995 season with the Baltimore Stallions of the Canadian Football League. In 1996, he played for the Florida Bobcats of the Arena Football League.

== Coaching career ==
Jones began his coaching career as a graduate assistant at Georgia. He has since spent more than 20 years as an assistant coach in college and professional football, including stints with Appalachian State (1998–2000), Kansas (2001–2002), LSU (2003–2004), Miami Dolphins (2005–2007), New Orleans Saints (2008–2012), Seattle Seahawks (2013–2017), and Atlanta Falcons (2018-2019).

Jones was a member of Nick Saban's staff at LSU that led the 2003 team to the national championship. He was also the position coach for 2003 SEC Defensive Player of the Years Chad Lavalais. He has also twice served as an assistant coach on teams that won Super Bowl championships, first with the 2009 New Orleans Saints and later as the defensive line coach for the 2013 Seattle Seahawks.

In 2010, he pled guilty to conspiracy to commit mail fraud and was suspended by the New Orleans Saints for 30 days for his role in a Texas real estate scam.

On April 9, 2018, Jones was hired as the assistant defensive line coach with the Atlanta Falcons. Jones returns to work under Coach Dan Quinn as Quinn's first season as Seattle’s defensive coordinator coincided with Jones' first season as defensive line coach with the Seahawks.

The Atlanta Falcons announced in January 2020 that Jones would not return to the coaching staff for the 2020 season.
