= Jack Hunt (American football) =

American football player (born 1981)

Profile
- Position: Safety

Personal information
- Born: November 30, 1981 (age 44); Ruston, Louisiana, U.S.

Career information
- High school: Ruston
- College: Louisiana State
- NFL draft: 2004: undrafted

Career history
- Tampa Bay Buccaneers (2004)*; Berlin Thunder (2005); Miami Dolphins (2005–2006)
- * Offseason or practice squad member only

Awards and highlights
- BCS national champion (2003)
- Stats at Pro Football Reference

Jack Hunt (born November 30, 1981) is an American former professional football safety. He most recently played for the Miami Dolphins.

== Early life ==
Hunt played football at Ruston High School in Ruston, Louisiana.

In high school, Hunt played various positions. He started at wingback and did just as an outstanding job on the defensive side of the ball. He lettered as a sophomore and won various city and state honors in his schools classification, 5A.

== College career ==
He signed with LSU and played with the Tigers for four years (2000–03). He started out as a wide receiver in his freshman year, playing in seven games and catching three receptions for 37 yards, and also assisted with a tackle. He caught 3 passes for 37 yards the following year. In 2002, his junior year, Hunt moved over to safety, playing 13 games and starting at five. He started 13 games at strong safety as a senior, recording 48 tackles, 25 assists and making four interceptions for 94 yards, returning two for touchdowns.

Hunt is most famous for being the player erroneously referred to by LSU radio announcer Jim Hawthorne as catching the Bluegrass Miracle Hail Mary game winning touchdown pass in LSU's 2002 victory over Kentucky, a pass actually caught by Devery Henderson.

== Professional career ==
=== 2005 ===
Hunt was signed by the Dolphins as a free agent, but played with the Berlin Thunder of the NFL Europe League in the spring. He played seven games with Miami and had one start, while recording 28 tackles. He was waived by the Dolphins on September 3 and signed to the practice squad on September 13 for the final 15 games. Hunt was then signed by Dolphins to their reserve/2006 future contract on January 3, 2006.

=== 2006 ===
Hunt was waived again by the Dolphins on September 2. On October 8, Hunt was signed to the Dolphins' practice squad and then released on October 30. He was re-signed to the practice squad on December 27 and was activated on December 30 in time to play in the season finale at Indianapolis on December 31. On February 14, 2007, Hunt was released by the Dolphins.
