= 2007 Miami Dolphins season =

42nd season and lowest win total in franchise history

- Owner: Wayne Huizenga
- General manager: Randy Mueller
- Head coach: Cam Cameron
- Home stadium: Dolphin Stadium

Results
- Record: 1–15
- Division place: 4th AFC East
- Playoffs: Did not qualify
- Pro Bowlers: DE Jason Taylor

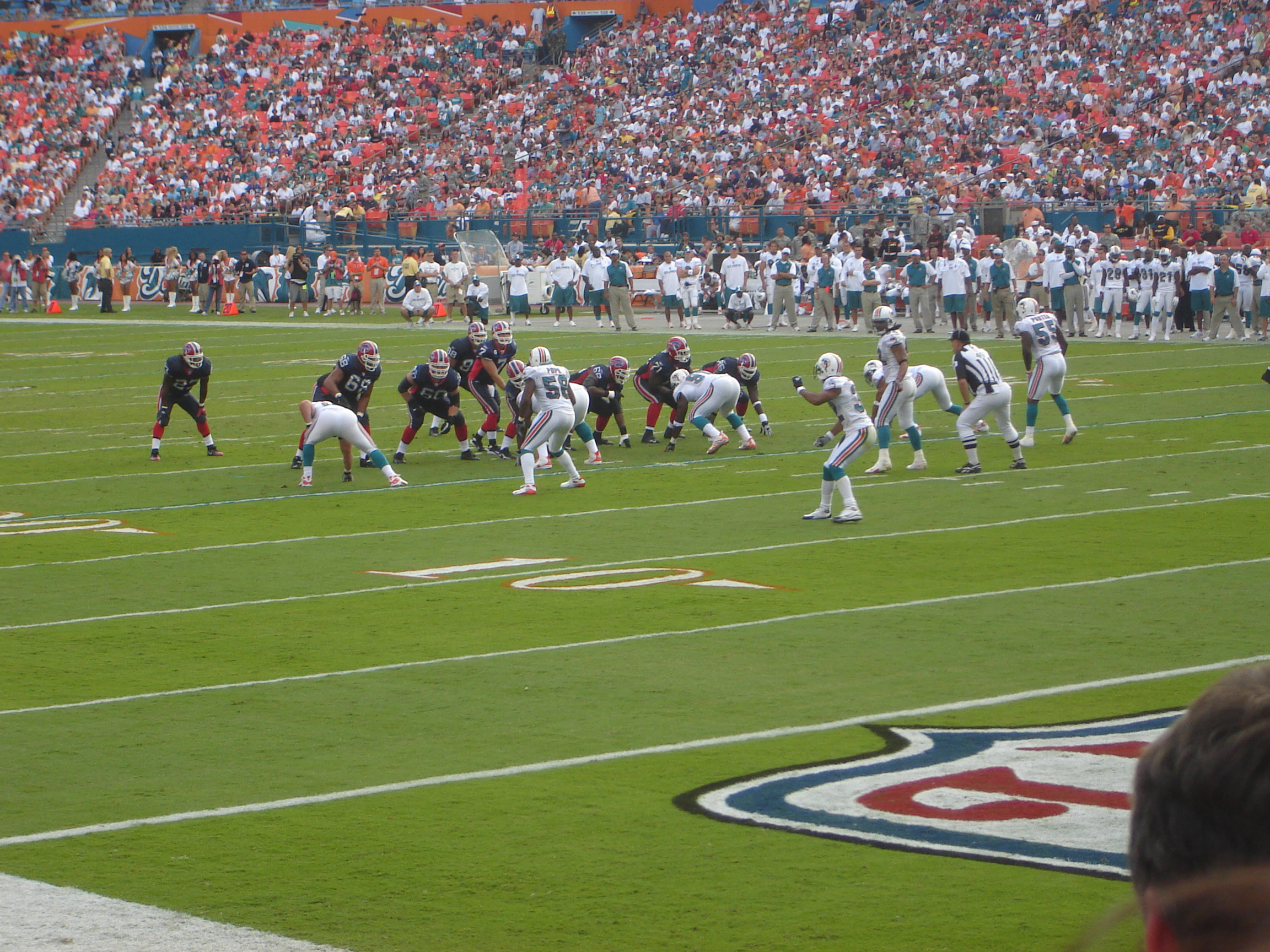
The Dolphins on defense at home to Buffalo, November 11, 2007

The 2007 season was the Miami Dolphins' 38th season in the National Football League, their 42nd overall, the third and final under general manager Randy Mueller and first and only under head coach Cam Cameron.

The Dolphins failed to improve upon their 6–10 record in 2006, falling to 1–15. The team narrowly avoided going winless, with their only win coming on a close overtime upset over the Baltimore Ravens on December 16. (Note: The Detroit Lions became the first team to go 0–16 the following season) It was the Dolphins' first and only season under head coach Cam Cameron, after former head coach Nick Saban unexpectedly resigned to become the head coach at the University of Alabama. Both Cameron and Mueller were fired after the season.

As of 2025, the 2007 record stands as the worst win-loss record in Dolphins history.

One of the few bright spots was defensive end Jason Taylor, who recorded 47 solo tackles and nine assists along with 11 sacks and forced and recovered 3 fumbles.

== Notable offseason events ==
=== Resignation of Nick Saban ===
During the 2006 season, rumors persisted of then-Dolphins head coach Nick Saban leaving for the University of Alabama at the end of the season. Saban denied these rumors throughout the season, to the point where on December 21 he told the South Florida media "I'm not going to be the Alabama coach." Whether or not he meant it at the time is unknown, but Saban's stance softened after the season, and on January 3, 2007, Saban resigned from the Dolphins to become the new head coach of the Alabama Crimson Tide.

=== Historic game in London ===
On February 2, 2007, NFL commissioner Roger Goodell announced that the Dolphins and New York Giants would play a game at London, England's Wembley Stadium. The game — the second regular season NFL game to take place outside of the United States and first outside of North America — counted as a home game for the Dolphins. It took place Sunday, October 28 (Week 8) with kickoff at 1:00 pm EST (5:00 pm local time). The Dolphins lost the game to the Giants by a score of 13–10.

In the 72 hours following the announcement, over half a million ticket requests were received. On May 17, 40,000 tickets were made available to people randomly selected from the initial requests. The tickets sold in 90 minutes.

=== Failed trade of Dan Wilkinson ===
On March 2, the Denver Broncos acquired defensive tackle Dan Wilkinson from the Dolphins in exchange for a sixth-round draft choice in the 2007 NFL draft. A condition of the trade was that Wilkinson report to the Broncos for a physical by Friday, March 16. He did not report for the physical, and although neither team was able to reach Wilkinson by phone the deadline for him to report was extended in hopes of eventually closing the deal.

On March 29, the deal between the Broncos and Dolphins was finally voided. The sixth-round pick reverted to the Broncos, and Wilkinson's rights were once again held by the Dolphins. After failing to attend offseason workouts with the Dolphins in the months that followed, the Dolphins finally terminated Wilkinson's contract on June 18.

=== Legal troubles ===
==== Joey Porter-Levi Jones altercation ====
After five seasons as AFC North rivals, former Pittsburgh Steelers linebacker Joey Porter (who had signed with the Dolphins earlier in the offseason) and Cincinnati Bengals offensive tackle Levi Jones were involved in an altercation in a Las Vegas casino on March 18.

==== Arrest and release of Fred Evans ====
In the early morning of 2007-06-23, 23-year-old Dolphins defensive tackle Fred Evans was arrested in Miami Beach. According to the police report, Evans was in a dispute with a taxi driver, and refused to leave the cab at the request of the officers called to the scene. Evans reportedly engaged in a physical struggle with the officers when they tried to handcuff him, with one officer being bitten on his left wrist. The officers then used tasers to subdue Evans. He was charged with battery on a police officer, disorderly conduct, resisting arrest and trespassing. Complicating matters could be the fact that Evans is already on probation in Colorado County, Texas for possession of marijuana.

In a team-released statement, Dolphins head coach Cam Cameron said: "We are aware that Fred Evans was arrested this morning. We will not condone this type of behavior. I assure everyone it will be dealt with seriously". Cameron made good on his word a few days later, as Evans was waived by the team on June 28.

==== Arrest and release of Kelly Campbell ====
Re-signed by the Dolphins in March after spending 2006 training camp with the team, wide receiver Kelly Campbell had his contract terminated on July 6. It was not until July 24, however, that it was revealed that Campbell's release stemmed from an arrest on drug charges in Atlanta, Georgia on July 3. Campbell was charged with felony possession of marijuana and Ecstasy and a misdemeanor charge of providing false information to police officers. It was Campbell's second arrest in Fulton County. In 2005, Campbell was arrested and charged with marijuana possession and theft by receiving stolen property involving a handgun. He reached a plea deal to avoid a trial.

==== Arrest of Chris Chambers ====
On the morning of Saturday, July 14, Pro Bowl wide receiver Chris Chambers was arrested in Charlotte, North Carolina and charged with driving while impaired and speeding. He was arrested around 2:30 am and later released on $1,750 bond. According to Charlotte-Mecklenburg police Capt. Lisa Goelz, Chambers faced charges of driving while impaired, speeding and reckless driving. On August 15, it was reported that a lawyer for Chambers said he would plead not guilty to driving while impaired. Chambers was charged despite his blood-alcohol content being below the legal limit, although North Carolina law says he can still be convicted.

On September 25, it was reported that Chambers would enter a plea deal in which he would plead guilty to speeding. Under the terms of the plea deal, the charges of driving while impaired and reckless driving were dismissed. He did not have to appear in court.

== Offseason personnel moves ==
=== Front office ===
On June 26, general manager Randy Mueller signed a contract extension that is expected to keep him with the team through at least 2010. Mueller will also receive a salary adjustment, however financial details were unavailable. After Nick Saban left following the 2006 season, Mueller's role was altered to give him control of personnel.

=== Coaches ===
After the departure of Nick Saban, Dolphins owner H. Wayne Huizenga went on a nationwide search for his next head coach. More than a dozen candidates were interviewed, and on January 19 Cam Cameron agreed to become the seventh head coach in franchise history. Cameron had previously served as offensive coordinator for the San Diego Chargers from 2002 to 2006. He received a four-year contract worth $10 million.

Upon Cameron's arrival, multiple changes were made to the coaching staff. Running backs coach Bobby Williams, wide receivers coach Charlie Baggett, defensive line coach Dan Quinn and strength and conditioning coach Bert Hill were fired. The team extended the contracts of special teams coordinator Keith Armstrong and outside linebackers coach Travis Jones (later reassigned as defensive ends coach). The Dolphins also signed a three-year, $8.1 million contract with defensive coordinator Dom Capers to retain his services. Outside additions to the staff were:

- Mike Dumas (Defensive Secondary Coaches Assistant)
- Steve Hoffman (Assistant Special Teams)
- Bobby Jackson (Running Backs)
- Marvin Marshall (Offensive Quality Control)
- Brett Maxie (Secondary – Safeties)
- Brad Ohrt (Assistant Strength and Conditioning)
- Diron Reynolds (Defensive Line – Tackles)
- Terry Robiskie (Wide Receivers)
- Matthew Schiotz (Strength and Conditioning)
- Terry Shea (Quarterbacks)
- Chad Walker (Defensive Quality Control)

Finally, previous offensive coordinator Mike Mularkey was retained, but was reassigned to the role of tight ends coach. Cameron stated he would call the offensive plays himself in 2007.

=== Players ===
==== Departures ====
- February 14 – Waived wide receiver Chris Davis.
- February 14 – Waived safety Jack Hunt.
- February 14 – Waived safety Norman LeJeune.
- March 1 – Terminated the contract of offensive guard Bennie Anderson.
- March 1 – Terminated the contract of offensive guard Seth McKinney.
- March 1 – Waived wide receiver Eric Kimble.
- March 2 – Terminated the contract of defensive end Kevin Carter.
- March 2 – Terminated the contract of offensive guard Jeno James.
- March 3 – Offensive tackle Damion McIntosh signed with the Kansas City Chiefs.
- March 3 – Running back Sammy Morris signed with the New England Patriots.
- March 5 – Defensive end Kevin Carter signed with the Tampa Bay Buccaneers.
- March 5 – Terminated the contract of quarterback Joey Harrington.
- March 5 – Terminated the contract of tight end Randy McMichael.
- March 7 – Running back Travis Minor signed with the St. Louis Rams.
- March 8 – Fullback Darian Barnes signed with the New York Jets.
- March 8 – Tight end Randy McMichael signed with the St. Louis Rams.
- March 13 – Defensive tackle Jeff Zgonina signed with the Houston Texans.
- March 14 – Offensive guard Toniu Fonoti signed with the Atlanta Falcons.
- March 14 – Offensive guard Seth McKinney signed with the Cleveland Browns.
- March 19 – Cornerback Eddie Jackson signed with the New England Patriots.
- March 27 – Defensive end David Bowens signed with the New York Jets.
- April 9 – Quarterback Joey Harrington signed with the Atlanta Falcons.
- April 18 – Opted not to match the St. Louis Rams' offer sheet to punter Donnie Jones.
- May 1 – Waived linebacker Bobby Iwuchukwu.
- May 1 – Waived wide receiver Marcus Vick.
- May 1 – Waived defensive tackle Manuel Wright.
- June 18 – Released defensive tackle Dan Wilkinson.
- June 28 – Waived defensive tackle Fred Evans.
- July 6 – Released wide receiver Kelly Campbell.
- July 17 – Released quarterback Daunte Culpepper.

==== Re-signings ====
- February 21 – Re-signed UFA defensive tackle Vonnie Holliday to a four-year, $20 million contract.
- March 8 – Re-signed UFA defensive tackle Keith Traylor to a two-year contract.
- March 9 – Re-signed UFA defensive tackle Kevin Vickerson to a one-year contract. (He was originally slated to become an exclusive-rights free agent, but was not tendered and became an unrestricted free agent before being re-signed.)
- March 19 – Re-signed ERFA fullback Kyle Eckel to a one-year contract.
- March 19 – Re-signed UFA cornerback Michael Lehan to a one-year contract.
- March 22 – Re-signed ERFA long snapper John Denney to a one-year contract.
- April 13 – Re-signed UFA safety Travares Tillman to a one-year contract.
- April 25 – Re-signed UFA linebacker Donnie Spragan to a one-year contract.
- May 18 – Re-signed RFA safety Yeremiah Bell to a one-year, $1.3 million contract.
- May 29 – Re-signed RFA quarterback Cleo Lemon to a one-year, $1.3 million contract.

==== Signings ====
- January 2 – Signed placekicker Matt Prater.
- January 2 – Signed tight end Jason Rader.
- January 2 – Signed wide receiver P.K. Sam.
- January 18 – Signed defensive tackle Steve Fifita.
- January 25 – Signed linebacker Akbar Gbaja-Biamila.
- January 25 – Signed linebacker Bobby Iwuchukwu.
- February 6 – Signed quarterback Gibran Hamdan.
- February 14 – Signed tight end Aaron Halterman.
- February 19 – Signed punter Ryan Flinn.
- February 22 – Signed running back Jesse Chatman.
- March 5 – Signed tight end David Martin (Packers) to a three-year, $3.57 million contract with a $1.2 million signing bonus.
- March 7 – Signed linebacker Joey Porter (Steelers) to a five-year, $32 million contract with a $12 million signing bonus.
- March 8 – Signed wide receiver Kelly Campbell.
- March 8 – Signed placekicker Jay Feely (Giants) to a three-year, $6 million contract.
- March 8 – Signed safety Cameron Worrell (Bears) to a two-year, $2 million contract with a $285,000 signing bonus.
- March 15 – Signed fullback Cory Schlesinger (Lions) to a two-year, $2 million contract.
- March 22 – Signed wide receiver Az-Zahir Hakim (Chargers) to a one-year contract.
- March 22 – Signed offensive guard Chris Liwienski (Cardinals) to a one-year contract.
- April 13 – Signed offensive tackle Mike Rosenthal (Vikings) to a one-year, $760,000 contract.
- April 16 – Signed center Johnathan Ingram.
- April 16 – Signed running back Ray Perkins.
- May 15 – Awarded cornerback Derrick Johnson off waivers from the Atlanta Falcons.
- June 27 – Signed safety Chris Harrell.
- June 28 – Assigned wide receiver Marvin Allen as their NFL Europa International Practice Squad player.

==== Trades ====
- March 5 – Traded wide receiver Wes Welker to the New England Patriots in exchange for second- and seventh-round picks in the 2007 NFL draft.
- April 3 – Traded placekicker Olindo Mare to the New Orleans Saints in exchange for a sixth-round pick in the 2007 NFL Draft.
- June 6 – Traded a conditional fifth-round draft pick in the 2008 NFL draft to the Kansas City Chiefs in exchange for quarterback Trent Green.
- October 16 – Traded wide receiver Chris Chambers to the San Diego Chargers in exchange for second round pick in the 2008 NFL draft

==== Free agents ====
RFA: Restricted free-agent, UFA: Unrestricted free-agent, ERFA: Exclusive rights free agent

Position	Player	Free agency status	Date signed	2007 team
LB	Keith Adams	UFA	December 12	Cleveland Browns
FB	Darian Barnes	UFA	March 8	New York Jets
S	Yeremiah Bell	RFA	May 18	Miami Dolphins
DE	David Bowens	UFA	March 27	New York Jets
LS	John Denney	ERFA	March 22	Miami Dolphins
FB	Kyle Eckel	ERFA	March 19	Miami Dolphins
OG	Toniu Fonoti	UFA	March 14	Atlanta Falcons
DT	Vonnie Holliday	UFA	February 21	Miami Dolphins
CB	Eddie Jackson	UFA	March 19	New England Patriots
OG	Kendyl Jacox	UFA		
P	Donnie Jones	RFA	April 18	St. Louis Rams
CB	Michael Lehan	UFA	March 19	Miami Dolphins
QB	Cleo Lemon	RFA	May 29	Miami Dolphins
QB	Shane Matthews	UFA/Retired		
OT	Damion McIntosh	UFA	May 3	Kansas City Chiefs
RB	Travis Minor	UFA	March 7	St. Louis Rams
RB	Sammy Morris	UFA	March 4	New England Patriots
LB	Donnie Spragan	UFA	April 25	Miami Dolphins
S	Travares Tillman	UFA	April 13	Miami Dolphins
DT	Keith Traylor	UFA	March 8	Miami Dolphins
DT	Kevin Vickerson	UFA	March 9	Miami Dolphins
WR	Wes Welker	RFA	March 5	New England Patriots
DT	Jeff Zgonina	UFA	March 13	Houston Texans

==== NFL Europa ====
The following Dolphins players were allocated to and participated in NFL Europa in the spring:

- DT Steve Fifita, Frankfurt Galaxy
- CB Shirdonya Mitchell, Frankfurt Galaxy
- WR P.K. Sam, Rhein Fire
- DT Kevin Vickerson, Cologne Centurions
- WR T.R. Dues, Frankfurt Galaxy

For their performances, Mitchel, Dues, and Vickerson were selected to the 2007 All-NFL Europa team after the season. Meanwhile, Sam led Rhein in receiving with 32 receptions, 529 yards and three touchdowns.

Upon the conclusion of the 2007 NFL Europa season, the Dolphins were assigned 24-year-old wide receiver Marvin Allen as their international practice squad player. Allen joined the team for training camp, and will not count toward the team's roster or eight-player practice squad. He also could not be signed by any NFL team during the 2007 season.

==== 2007 NFL draft ====
The follow players were drafted by the Dolphins in the 2007 NFL draft, which took place on April 28–29:

Draft		Player name	Position	College	Height	Weight
Rnd	Pick	Player name	Position	College	Height	Weight
1	9	Ted Ginn Jr.	Wide receiver	Ohio State	5 ft 11 in	178 lbs
2	40	John Beck	Quarterback	BYU	6 ft 2 in	215 lb
2	60	Samson Satele	Center/Guard	Hawaii	6 ft 2 in	300 lb
3	71	Lorenzo Booker	Running back	Florida State	5 ft 10 in	191 lb
4	108	Paul Soliai	Defensive tackle	Utah	6 ft 4 in	344 lb
6	181	Reagan Mauia	Fullback	Hawaii	6 ft 0 in	270 lb
6	199	Drew Mormino	Center	Central Michigan	6 ft 3 in	299 lb
7	219	Kelvin Smith	Linebacker	Syracuse	6 ft 2 in	233 lb
7	225	Brandon Fields	Punter	Michigan State	6 ft 6 in	235 lb
7	238	Abraham Wright	Linebacker	Colorado	6 ft 3 in	245 lb

- The Dolphins' last second-round pick (60th overall) was acquired from the New England Patriots in the Wes Welker trade. The team's final pick in the draft (238th overall) was also acquired in the deal.
- The team's fifth-round pick became property of the Detroit Lions due to the Joey Harrington trade from the previous offseason.
- The team's second sixth-round pick (199th overall) was acquired from the New Orleans Saints for kicker Olindo Mare.
- The team's middle seventh-round pick (225th overall) was acquired from the St. Louis Rams when they signed restricted free agent punter Donnie Jones.

===== Draft pick signings =====
The Dolphins got a handful of their draft picks signed within a month of the draft, inking four-year deals with running back Lorenzo Booker, punter Brandon Fields, fullback Reagan Mauia, linebacker Kelvin Smith and linebacker Abraham Wright between May 23–25. The Dolphins signed one draft pick in June – defensive tackle Paul Soliai, who also received a four-year deal. Offensive lineman Samson Satele signed for four years on July 18, while quarterback John Beck and center Dew Mormino signed four-year contracts on July 23. At that time, first-round pick Ted Ginn Jr. was the only unsigned draft pick. However, on the same day that second-round pick Beck was signed, it was reported that the Dolphins and Ginn were close to contract agreement.

==== Undrafted free agents ====
Between May 4–17, the Dolphins signed 16 undrafted free agents following the draft. They were:

- DE Mkristo Bruce (Washington State)
- S Courtney Bryan (New Mexico State)
- T Marion Dukes (Clemson)
- G Tala Esera (Hawaii)
- CB Tuff Harris (Montana)
- WR Gabe Hatchett (Southern Oregon)
- S David Lofton (Stanford)
- DT Marquay Love (Houston)
- WR Michael Malone (Sam Houston State)
- LB Edmond Miles (Iowa)
- G Stephen Parker (Arkansas)
- CB Geoff Pope (Howard)
- WR Kerry Reed (Michigan State)
- WR David Sutton (Texas El-Paso)
- S Christopher Vedder (San Jose State)
- T Julius Wilson (Alabama-Birmingham)

Unlike the other 15, Hatchett stuck with the team less than two weeks. On May 18, Hatchett was waived upon the signings of Lofton and Malone, as well as the re-signing of restricted free agent Yeremiah Bell. On July 23, the Dolphins signed defensive tackle Brian Soi of Utah State. Soi declared for the NFL's Supplemental Draft in July but went undrafted.

== Uniforms ==
- The Miami Dolphins entered the 2007 season using the same uniform combinations as they used in 2006.
- It was announced during the offseason that the Dolphins would make slight alterations to their uniforms. The navy blue outline on the numbers will be thinned in hopes of making them easier to read for viewers.
- As with many teams that play in warm climates, the Dolphins wear all-white at home and the aqua jersey-white pants scheme only at home night games.
- While the team still has an all-aqua alternate scheme and an alternate orange jersey, they wore neither in the two years under head coach Nick Saban.
- Beginning in 2007, the Dolphins' practice jerseys now have last names on the back.

== Staff ==
Miami Dolphins 2007 coaching staff
Front office: Owner/Chairman – H. Wayne Huizenga; President/COO – Bryan Wiedmeier; General manager – Randy Mueller; Head coaches: Head coach – Cam Cameron; Offensive coaches: Quarterbacks – Terry Shea; Running backs – Bobby Jackson; Wide receivers – Terry Robiskie; Tight ends – Mike Mularkey; Offensive line – Hudson Houck; Assistant offensive line – Tim Davis; Offensive quality control – Marvin Marshall; Special teams coaches: Special teams coordinator – Keith Armstrong; Assistant special teams – Steve Hoffman	Defensive coaches: Defensive coordinator – Dom Capers; Defensive ends – Travis Jones; Defensive tackles – Diron Reynolds; Linebackers – George Edwards; Assistant linebackers – Glenn Pires; Secondary (Cornerbacks) – Mel Phillips; Secondary (Safeties) – Brett Maxie; Defensive secondary coaches assistant – Mike Dumas; Defensive quality control – Chad Walker; Strength and conditioning: Strength and conditioning – Matthew Schiotz; Assistant Athletic Trainer - Troy Maurer; Assistant strength and conditioning – Brad Ohrt

== Training camp ==
In 2007, Miami Dolphins training camp took place at the Dolphins Training Center in Davie, Florida. Rookies reported July 22, and veterans July 27. Training camp ended for veterans and married players on August 24, when they were allowed to check out of the team hotel and return home. Training camp ended for the remaining players on Saturday, August 26.

=== Opening training camp roster ===
The following is the Miami Dolphins' roster at the time 2007 training camp opened on July 27:

Miami Dolphins 2007 Opening training camp roster
Quarterbacks: 9 John Beck; 10 Trent Green; 7 Gibran Hamdan; 17 Cleo Lemon; Running backs: 20 Lorenzo Booker; 23 Ronnie Brown; 28 Jesse Chatman; 38 Patrick Cobbs; 40 Kyle Eckel FB; 45 Reagan Mauia FB; 33 Ray Perkins; 30 Cory Schlesinger FB; Wide receivers: 86 Marty Booker; 84 Chris Chambers; 19 Ted Ginn Jr. WR/KR; 82 Derek Hagan; 81 Az-Zahir Hakim; 83 Michael Malone; 15 Kerry Reed; 14 P. K. Sam; 18 David Sutton; Tight ends: 49 Aaron Halterman; 88 David Martin; 89 Tim Massaquoi; 87 Justin Peelle; 85 Jason Rader	Offensive linemen: 79 Anthony Alabi T; 72 Vernon Carey T; 71 Marion Dukes T; 69 Tala Esera G; 66 Rex Hadnot G; 68 Johnathan Ingram C; 76 Chris Liwienski G; 77 Drew Mormino C/G; 63 Stephen Parker G; 78 Mike Rosenthal T; 64 Samson Satele C; 70 L. J. Shelton T; 73 Dan Stevenson G; 65 Julius Wilson T; Defensive linemen: 74 Mkristo Bruce DE; 60 Steve Fifita DT; 91 Vonnie Holliday DT; 61 Marquay Love DT; 95 Chase Page DE/DT; 98 Matt Roth DE; 96 Paul Soliai NT; 94 Keith Traylor NT; 92 Kevin Vickerson DT; 90 Rodrique Wright DT	Linebackers: 52 Channing Crowder OLB; 93 Akbar Gbaja-Biamila OLB; 57 Jim Maxwell LB; 51 Robert McCune ILB; 48 Edmond Miles OLB; 56 Derrick Pope LB; 58 Kelvin Smith ILB; 59 Donnie Spragan OLB; 53 Abraham Wright OLB; Defensive backs: 32 Jason Allen CB/FS; 25 Will Allen CB; 37 Yeremiah Bell SS; 47 Courtney Bryan S; 29 Travis Daniels CB; 41 Chris Harrell FS; 35 Tuff Harris CB; 24 Renaldo Hill FS; 36 Derrick Johnson CB; 22 Michael Lehan CB; 42 David Lofton S; 27 Shirdonya Mitchell CB; 43 Geoff Pope CB; 26 Travares Tillman SS; 31 Christopher Vedder FS; 44 Cameron Worrell FS	Special teams: 97 John Denney LS; 3 Jay Feely K; 4 Brandon Fields P; 6 Ryan Flinn P; 1 Matt Prater K; Active/Physically Unable to Perform: 21 André Goodman CB; 67 Joe Toledo G/T; Active/Non-Football Injury: 75 Brian Soi DT; Injured Reserve: currently vacant; Suspended: 34 Ricky Williams RB; Practice squad: 16 Marvin Allen WR ^{Int'l}; rookies in italics

=== Transactions ===
On the eve of training camp on July 23, cornerback André Goodman and offensive lineman Joe Toledo were placed on the Physically Unable to Perform list due to lingering injuries. Undrafted rookie defensive tackle Brian Soi was immediately placed on the Non-Football Injury list upon being signed. The following transactions were made during training camp, which began on July 27:

- July 28: Activated defensive tackle Brian Soi from the Non-Football Injury list.
- July 28: Awarded tight end Courtney Anderson off waivers from the Oakland Raiders.
- July 28: Waived safety David Lofton.
- July 28: Placed offensive tackle Marion Dukes on the Left Squad list.
- August 26: Placed offensive tackle Mike Rosenthal on Injured Reserve.

=== Aug 6 depth chart ===
The following is the first depth chart released by the Dolphins during training camp, dated August 6.

Offense

Pos.	First Team	Second Team	Third Team
QB	10 Trent Green; 17 Cleo Lemon	9 John Beck	7 Gibran Hamdan
RB	23 Ronnie Brown	28 Jesse Chatman; 38 Patrick Cobbs	20 Lorenzo Booker; 33 Ray Perkins
FB	30 Cory Schlesinger	45 Reagan Mauia	89 Tim Massaquoi; 40 Kyle Eckel
WR	86 Marty Booker	19 Ted Ginn Jr. 15 Kerry Reed	81 Az-Zahir Hakim; 83 Michael Malone
WR	84 Chris Chambers	82 Derek Hagan; 18 David Sutton	14 P. K. Sam; 16 Marvin Allen
TE	88 David Martin	87 Justin Peelle; 49 Courtney Anderson	85 Jason Rader
LT	72 Vernon Carey	65 Julius Wilson	
LG	76 Chris Liwienski	69 Tala Esera	
C	64 Samson Satele	68 Johnathan Ingram	73 Dan Stevenson
RG	77 Drew Mormino	65 Rex Hadnot	63 Stephen Parker
RT	79 Anthony Alabi	70 L. J. Shelton	78 Mike Rosenthal

Defense

Pos.	First Team	Second Team	Third Team
DE	99 Jason Taylor	93 Akbar Gbaja-Biamila	74 Mkristo Bruce
NT	94 Keith Traylor	96 Paul Soliai	61 Marquay Love; 60 Steve Fifita
DT	91 Vonnie Holliday	90 Rodrique Wright	75 Brian Soi
DE	98 Matt Roth	95 Chase Page	92 Kevin Vickerson
WLB	52 Channing Crowder	56 Derrick Pope	48 Edmond Miles
MLB	54 Zach Thomas	51 Robert McCune	58 Kelvin Smith
SLB	55 Joey Porter	59 Donnie Spragan	57 Jim Maxwell; 53 Abraham Wright
LCB	25 Will Allen	22 Michael Lehan	36 Derrick Johnson; 43 Geoff Pope
RCB	29 Travis Daniels	32 Jason Allen	27 Shirdonya Mitchell
FS	24 Renaldo Hill	44 Cameron Worrell	35 Tuff Harris; 41 Chris Harrell
SS	37 Yeremiah Bell	26 Travares Tillman	47 Courtney Bryan; 31 Christopher Vedder

Special teams

Pos.	First Team	Second Team	Third Team
P	4 Brandon Fields	6 Ryan Flinn	
K	3 Jay Feely	1 Matt Prater	
LS	97 John Denney	99 Jason Taylor	80 Aaron Halterman
PR	19 Ted Ginn Jr.	86 Marty Booker	81 Az-Zahir Hakim
KR	19 Ted Ginn Jr.	23 Ronnie Brown	20 Lorenzo Booker
H	4 Brandon Fields	6 Ryan Flinn	

=== Quarterback competition ===
During training camp, Cameron held a battle for the starting quarterback job between Trent Green and Cleo Lemon. Green started the team's first two preseason games and completed 45 percent of his passes for 101 yards with one interception. Lemon was the second quarterback to play in each contest and completed 76 percent of his passes for 108 yards. Nevertheless, Cameron announced that Green would be the team's starting quarterback in 2007. The announcement came on August 20 with two preseason games left to be played. Lemon, who had primarily been no higher than third string in his NFL career, is slated to be the backup to Green in 2007.

== Preseason ==
=== Schedule ===
Week	Date	Opponent	Result	Record	Venue	Recap
1	August 11	Jacksonville Jaguars	W 18–17	1–0	Dolphin Stadium	Recap
2	August 16	at Kansas City Chiefs	W 11–10	2–0	Arrowhead Stadium	Recap
3	August 25	Tampa Bay Buccaneers	L 28–31	2–1	Dolphin Stadium	Recap
4	August 30	at New Orleans Saints	L 0–7	2–2	Louisiana Superdome	Recap

=== Game summaries ===
==== Week 1: vs. Jacksonville Jaguars ====
	1	2	3	4	Total
Jaguars	0	10	7	0	17
Dolphins	0	3	7	8	18

at Dolphin Stadium, Miami Gardens, Florida

==== Week 2: at Kansas City Chiefs ====
	1	2	3	4	Total
Dolphins	0	3	0	8	11
Chiefs	0	7	0	3	10

at Arrowhead Stadium, Kansas City, Missouri

==== Week 3: vs. Tampa Bay Buccaneers ====
	1	2	3	4	Total
Buccaneers	7	10	0	14	31
Dolphins	14	0	7	7	28

at Dolphin Stadium, Miami Gardens, Florida

=== Cutdown to 75 ===
With NFL rules mandating team rosters must be cut down to 75 players by August 28, the Dolphins released nine players the day before to reach the limit. Those released were: placekicker Matt Prater, punter Ryan Flinn, wide receiver David Sutton, tight end Jason Rader, cornerback Shirdonya Mitchell, safeties Chris Harrell and Christopher Vedder, running back Ray Perkins and cornerback TR Dues.

The team made two extra roster moves on the cutdown day. Offensive guard/tackle Joe Toledo was moved to the Reserve/Physically Unable to Perform list, meaning he would be eligible to return Week 7 of the regular season. Free agent linebacker/defensive end Jorge Cordova was added to the roster. Cordova had been released by the Jacksonville Jaguars, with which he had spent the previous three seasons.

=== Cutdown to 53 and subsequent moves ===
On September 1, the Dolphins were required to trim the roster to 53 for the regular season. With 22 roster moves needed in all, the Dolphins waived 16 players, waived/injured four and terminated the contracts of two.

The two veterans that had their contracts terminated were fullback Cory Schlesinger and wide receiver Az-Zahir Hakim. The four waived/injured players were guard Dan Stevenson, wide receiver P. K. Sam and linebackers Jim Maxwell and Robert McCune. In addition, the 16 players that were waived outright were:

- TE Courtney Anderson
- DE Mkristo Bruce
- DE Jorge Cordova
- FB Kyle Eckel
- G Tala Esera
- TE Aaron Halterman
- QB Gibran Hamdan
- S Tuff Harris
- CB Derrick Johnson
- G Marquay Love
- WR Michael Malone
- TE Tim Massaquoi
- G Stephen Parker
- CB Geoff Pope
- DT Brian Soi
- OT Julius Wilson

The Dolphins' roster was not finalized immediately after cuts, however. Three players were claimed off waivers by the Dolphins from other teams, requiring an additional three roster moves. On September 2, wide receiver Kerry Reed and center Johnathan Ingram were waived, while rookie center/guard Drew Mormino was played in season-ending Injured Reserve with a shoulder injury. The Dolphins claimed two players off waivers from the San Diego Chargers – wide receiver Greg Camarillo and offensive tackle Cory Lekkerkerker. Meanwhile, offensive lineman Gene Mruczkowski was claimed off waivers from the New England Patriots.

Five days later, defensive end Rob Ninkovich was claimed off waivers from the New Orleans Saints. To make room for him, rookie linebacker Kelvin Smith was waived.

Two Dolphins players changed their jersey numbers following the preseason. Long snapper John Denney, who wore No. 97 the first two years of his career, switched to No. 92. Undrafted rookie linebacker Edmond Miles switched from No. 48 to 50 to comply with NFL rules.

=== Practice squad ===
On September 2 the Dolphins made five additions to their practice squad, all of which among the players cut by the team the day before. Those players were tight end Aaron Halterman, safety Tuff Harris, guard Marquay Love and offensive tackle Julius Wilson and wide receiver Marvin Allen. As the international practice squad player, Allen must remain on the team's practice squad all year and does not count toward the eight-man limit.

Two days later, the Dolphins signed three more players – guard Tala Esera, wide receiver Kerry Reed and wide receiver Chandler Williams – to their practice squad. Esera and Reed were with the Dolphins in preseason and released earlier in the month. Chandler, meanwhile, was a seventh-round pick by the Minnesota Vikings in the 2007 NFL draft out of Florida International University. He was waived by the team during final cuts on September 1.

== Regular season ==
=== Schedule ===
Week	Date	Opponent	Result	Record	Venue	Recap
1	September 9	at Washington Redskins	L 13–16 (OT)	0–1	FedExField	Recap
2	September 16	Dallas Cowboys	L 20–37	0–2	Dolphin Stadium	Recap
3	September 23	at New York Jets	L 28–31	0–3	Giants Stadium	Recap
4	September 30	Oakland Raiders	L 17–35	0–4	Dolphin Stadium	Recap
5	October 7	at Houston Texans	L 19–22	0–5	Reliant Stadium	Recap
6	October 14	at Cleveland Browns	L 31–41	0–6	Cleveland Browns Stadium	Recap
7	October 21	New England Patriots	L 28–49	0–7	Dolphin Stadium	Recap
8	October 28	New York Giants	L 10–13	0–8	(United Kingdom) Wembley Stadium (London)	Recap
9	Bye					
10	November 11	Buffalo Bills	L 10–13	0–9	Dolphin Stadium	Recap
11	November 18	at Philadelphia Eagles	L 7–17	0–10	Lincoln Financial Field	Recap
12	November 26	at Pittsburgh Steelers	L 0–3	0–11	Heinz Field	Recap
13	December 2	New York Jets	L 13–40	0–12	Dolphin Stadium	Recap
14	December 9	at Buffalo Bills	L 17–38	0–13	Ralph Wilson Stadium	Recap
15	December 16	Baltimore Ravens	W 22–16 (OT)	1–13	Dolphin Stadium	Recap
16	December 23	at New England Patriots	L 7–28	1–14	Gillette Stadium	Recap
17	December 30	Cincinnati Bengals	L 25–38	1–15	Dolphin Stadium	Recap

=== Opening day roster ===
Miami Dolphins 2007 opening day roster
Quarterbacks: 9 John Beck; 10 Trent Green; 17 Cleo Lemon; Running backs: 20 Lorenzo Booker; 23 Ronnie Brown; 28 Jesse Chatman; 38 Patrick Cobbs; 45 Reagan Mauia FB; Wide receivers: 86 Marty Booker; 83 Greg Camarillo; 84 Chris Chambers; 19 Ted Ginn Jr.; 82 Derek Hagan; Tight ends: 88 David Martin; 87 Justin Peelle	Offensive linemen: 79 Anthony Alabi T; 72 Vernon Carey T; 66 Rex Hadnot G; 71 Cory Lekkerkerker T; 76 Chris Liwienski G; 63 Gene Mruczkowski G; 64 Samson Satele C; 70 L. J. Shelton T; Defensive linemen: 60 Steve Fifita NT; 93 Akbar Gbaja-Biamila DE; 91 Vonnie Holliday DT; 97 Rob Ninkovich DE; 95 Chase Page DE; 98 Matt Roth DE; 96 Paul Soliai NT; 99 Jason Taylor DE; 94 Keith Traylor NT; 90 Rodrique Wright DT	Linebackers: 52 Channing Crowder OLB; 50 Edmond Miles OLB; 56 Derrick Pope OLB; 55 Joey Porter OLB; 59 Donnie Spragan OLB; 54 Zach Thomas ILB; 53 Abraham Wright OLB; Defensive backs: 32 Jason Allen CB; 25 Will Allen CB; 37 Yeremiah Bell SS; 47 Courtney Bryan SS; 29 Travis Daniels CB; 21 André Goodman CB; 24 Renaldo Hill FS; 22 Michael Lehan CB; 26 Travares Tillman SS; 44 Cameron Worrell FS; Special teams: 92 John Denney LS; 3 Jay Feely K; 4 Brandon Fields P	Reserve lists: -- Marion Dukes OT (Left Squad); 57 Jim Maxwell OLB (Waived/Injured); 51 Robert McCune ILB (Waived/Injured); 77 Drew Mormino G/C (IR); 78 Mike Rosenthal OT (IR); 14 P. K. Sam WR (Waived/Injured); 73 Dan Stevenson C (Waived/Injured); 67 Joe Toledo G (PUP); 34 Ricky Williams RB (Susp.); Practice squad: 16 Marvin Allen WR ^{Int'l}; 69 Tala Esera G; 80 Aaron Halterman TE; 35 Tuff Harris FS; 61 Marquay Love G; 15 Kerry Reed WR; 18 Chandler Williams WR; 65 Julius Wilson OT; rookies in italics

=== Final roster ===
Miami Dolphins 2007 final roster
Quarterbacks: 9 John Beck; 7 Casey Bramlet; 17 Cleo Lemon; Running backs: 20 Lorenzo Booker; 28 Jesse Chatman; 38 Patrick Cobbs; 27 Samkon Gado; 45 Reagan Maui'a FB; Wide receivers: 86 Marty Booker; 83 Greg Camarillo; 19 Ted Ginn Jr. KR/PR; 82 Derek Hagan; Tight ends: 80 Aaron Halterman; 88 David Martin; 87 Justin Peelle	Offensive linemen: 79 Anthony Alabi T; 72 Vernon Carey T; 66 Rex Hadnot G; 71 Cory Lekkerkerker G/T; 76 Chris Liwienski G; 63 Gene Mruczkowski C/G; 68 Ikechuku Ndukwe G/T; 64 Samson Satele C; 70 L. J. Shelton T; 65 Julius Wilson T; Defensive linemen: 62 Anthony Bryant DT; 60 Steve Fifita DT; 91 Vonnie Holliday DE/DT; 74 Quentin Moses DE/DT; 93 Rob Ninkovich DE; 75 Derreck Robinson DE; 98 Matt Roth DE; 96 Paul Soliai DT; 99 Jason Taylor DE; 94 Keith Traylor DT; 90 Rodrique Wright DT	Linebackers: 50 Edmond Miles OLB; 56 Derrick Pope MLB; 55 Joey Porter OLB; 58 Kelvin Smith MLB; 59 Donnie Spragan OLB; 51 Mark Washington OLB; Defensive backs: 32 Jason Allen FS; 25 Will Allen CB; 47 Courtney Bryan SS; 29 Travis Daniels CB; 35 Tuff Harris FS; 22 Michael Lehan CB; 33 Jereme Perry CB/S; 31 Lance Schulters SS; Special teams: 92 John Denney LS; 3 Jay Feely K; 4 Brandon Fields P	Reserve lists: 37 Yeremiah Bell S (IR); 23 Ronnie Brown RB (IR); 52 Channing Crowder LB (IR); 21 André Goodman CB (IR); 10 Trent Green QB (IR); 24 Renaldo Hill S (IR); 77 Drew Mormino C/G (IR); 95 Chase Page DE/DT (IR); 78 Mike Rosenthal T (IR); 54 Zach Thomas LB (IR); 26 Travares Tillman S (IR); 67 Joe Toledo G/T (PUP); 34 Ricky Williams RB (IR); 44 Cameron Worrell S (IR); 53 Abraham Wright LB (IR); Practice squad: 16 Marvin Allen WR ^{Int'l}; -- Marcello Church LB; 69 Tala Esera G; -- Stefan Logan RB; 61 Marquay Love G; 15 Kerry Reed WR; -- Jacoby Watkins CB; 18 Chandler Williams WR; rookies in italics 53 active, 15 inactive, 8 practice squad

=== Game summaries ===
==== Week 1: at Washington Redskins ====
Quarter	1	2	3	4	OT	Total
Dolphins	0	7	3	3	0	13
Redskins	0	3	7	3	3	16

at FedExField, Landover, Maryland

- Game time: 1:00 pm EST
- Game weather: 82 °F or 27.8 °C (sunny)
- Game attendance: 90,163
- Referee: Gene Steratore
- TV announcers (CBS): Greg Gumbel (play-by-play) and Dan Dierdorf (color commentator)

Game information

First quarter

- No scoring plays

Second quarter

- WAS – Shaun Suisham 31-yard field goal, 12:00. Redskins 3–0. Drive: 13 plays, 67 yards, 6:42.
- MIA – Justin Peelle 1-yard pass from Trent Green (Jay Feely kick), 0:00. Dolphins 7–3. Drive: 11 plays, 61 yards, 4:23.

Third quarter

- WAS – Clinton Portis 19-yard run (Shaun Suisham kick), 11:47. Redskins 10–7. Drive: 6 plays, 26 yards, 3;13.
- MIA – Jay Feely 20-yard field goal, 3:40. Tied 10–10. Drive: 9 plays, 38 yards, 4:36.

Fourth quarter

- WAS – Shaun Suisham 44-yard field goal, 5:35. Redskins 13–10. Drive: 9 plays, 36 yards, 6:13.
- MIA – Jay Feely 36-yard field goal, 2:00. Tied 13–13. Drive: 8 plays, 71 yards, 3:35.

Overtime

- WAS – Shaun Suisham 39-yard field goal, 9:27. Redskins 16–13. Drive: 10 plays, 57 yards, 5:36.

Top passers

- MIA – Trent Green – 24/38, 219 yards, TD
- WAS – Jason Campbell – 12/21, 222 yards, 2 INT

Top rushers

- MIA – Ronnie Brown – 11 rushes, 32 yards
- WAS – Clinton Portis – 17 rushes, 98 yards, TD

Top receivers

- MIA – Chris Chambers – 6 receptions, 92 yards
- WAS – Antwaan Randle El – 5 receptions, 162 yards

The Dolphins began their 2007 campaign on the road against the Washington Redskins. After a scoreless first quarter, the Redskins made the first move with kicker Shaun Suisham getting a 31-yard field goal three minutes into the second quarter. Miami took the lead before the end of the half with a one-yard touchdown pass from Trent Green to tight end Justin Peelle as time expired.

Washington took a 10–7 lead on a 19-yard Clinton Portis touchdown run with just under 12 minutes remaining in the third quarter. Dolphins kicker Jay Feely tied the game at 10 later in the quarter on a 20-yard field goal, and each team notched another field goal in the fourth quarter. With four seconds remaining and the ball on the Washington 43-yard line, Redskins quarterback Jason Campbell launched a last-second Hail Mary pass that was batted by Dolphins defensive end Jason Taylor in the end zone. Redskins wide receiver Antwaan Randle El caught the ball at the six but was tackled at the three-yard line before he could score the winning touchdown.

The Redskins won the coin toss to begin overtime and promptly mounted a 10-play, 62-yard drive that included just two passes. Suisham made his third field goal of the game, this time from 39 yards out, to win the game 16–13 and hand Miami their first loss of the season as they started out 0–1 and 0–1 against NFC Opponents.

==== Week 2: vs. Dallas Cowboys ====
Quarter	1	2	3	4	Total
Cowboys	3	7	10	17	37
Dolphins	3	3	7	7	20

at Dolphin Stadium, Miami Gardens, Florida

- Game time: 4:05 pm EST
- Game weather: 89 °F or 31.7 °C (Mostly Cloudy)
- Game attendance: 71,615
- Referee: Terry McAulay
- TV announcers (Fox): Kenny Albert (play-by-play), Daryl Johnston (color commentator), & Tony Siragusa (sideline reporter)

Game information

First quarter

- MIA – Jay Feely 37-yard field goal, 7:07. Dolphins 3–0. Drive: 12 plays, 44 yards, 6:50.
- DAL – Nick Folk 26-yard field goal, 0:07. Tied 3–3. Drive: 12 plays, 67 yards, 7:00.

Second quarter

- DAL – Marion Barber III 1-yard run (Nick Folk kick), 1:54. Cowboys 10–3. Drive: 12 plays, 32 yards, 6:28.
- MIA – Jay Feely 45-yard field goal, 0:00. Cowboys 10–6. Drive: 13 plays, 55 yards, 1:49.

Third quarter

- MIA – Marty Booker 18-yard pass from Trent Green (Jay Feely kick), 9:41. Dolphins 13–10. Drive: 10 plays, 73 yards, 5:19.
- DAL – Tony Curtis 2-yard pass from Tony Romo (Nick Folk kick), 4:41. Cowboys 17–13. Drive: 3 plays, 30 yards, 1:14.
- DAL – Nick Folk 28-yard field goal, 2:14. Cowboys 20–13. Drive: 4 plays, 5 yards, 1:34.

Fourth quarter

- DAL – Nick Folk 47-yard field goal, 11:03. Cowboys 23–13. Drive: 9 plays, 19 yards, 5:16.
- DAL – Terrell Owens 34-yard pass from Tony Romo (Nick Folk kick), 4:01. Cowboys 30–13. Drive: 4 plays, 39 yards, 1:43.
- MIA – Derek Hagan 21-yard pass from Trent Green (Jay Feely kick), 3:26. Cowboys 30–20. Drive: 3 plays, 49 yards, 0:35.
- DAL – Marion Barber III 40-yard run (Nick Folk kick), 3:17. Cowboys 37–20. Drive: 1 play, 40 yards, 0:09.

Top passers

- DAL – Tony Romo – 14/29, 186 yards, 2 TD
- MIA – Trent Green – 23/40, 287 yards, 2 TD, 4 INT

Top rushers

- DAL – Marion Barber III – 14 rushes, 89 yards, 2 TD
- MIA – Ronnie Brown – 11 rushes, 33 yards

Top receivers

- DAL – Terrell Owens – 5 receptions, 97 yards, TD
- MIA – Chris Chambers – 9 receptions, 109 yards

Attempting to rebound from their overtime road loss to the Redskins in Week 1, the Dolphins hosted the Dallas Cowboys in Week 2. In the first quarter, Miami got the first points of the game when kicker Jay Feely converted a 37-yard field goal. The Cowboys responded with a 26-yard field goal by Nick Folk. In the second quarter, Dallas took the lead on a 1-yard Marion Barber III touchdown run. Feely made a 45-yard field goal attempt as the half ended with the Cowboys leading 10–6.

In the third quarter, Miami regained the lead with quarterback Trent Green completing an 18-yard TD pass to wide receiver Marty Booker. However, the Cowboys jumped back out in front with quarterback Tony Romo completing a 2-yard touchdown pass to tight end Tony Curtis, which was followed by Folk kicking a 28-yard field goal. In the fourth quarter, Dallas extended the lead with Folk's 47-yard field goal and Romo's 34-yard touchdown pass to wide receiver Terrell Owens. The Dolphins tried to come back as Green completed a 21-yard touchdown pass to wide receiver Derek Hagan, but the Cowboys put the game away with Barber's 40-yard touchdown run as Miami fell to 0–2 and 0–2 against NFC opponents.

==== Week 3: at New York Jets ====
Quarter	1	2	3	4	Total
Dolphins	0	13	0	15	28
Jets	7	14	3	7	31

at The Meadowlands, East Rutherford, New Jersey

- Game time: 1:00 pm EST
- Game weather: 72 °F or 22.2 °C (clear)
- Game attendance: 77,197
- Referee: Bill Leavy
- TV announcers (CBS): Greg Gumbel (play-by-play) and Dan Dierdorf (color commentator)

Game information

First quarter

- NYJ – Laveranues Coles 3-yard pass from Chad Pennington (Mike Nugent kick), 1:02. Jets 7–0. Drive: 10 plays, 55 yards, 5:39.

Second quarter

- MIA – Ronnie Brown 1-yard run (Jay Feely kick), 13:00. Tied 7–7. Drive: 6 plays, 76 yards, 3:02.
- NYJ – Leon Washington 98-yard kick return (Mike Nugent kick), 12:47. Jets 14–7.
- MIA – Jay Feely 31-yard field goal, 7:32. Jets 14–10. Drive: 10 plays, 15 yards, 5:28.
- MIA – Jay Feely 39-yard field goal, 1:40. Jets 14–13. Drive: 9 plays, 58 yards, 3:29.
- NYJ – Chris Baker 4-yard pass from Chad Pennington (Mike Nugent kick), 0:02. Jets 21–13. Drive: 10 plays, 57 yards, 2:00.

Third quarter

- NYJ – Mike Nugent 21-yard field goal, 8:01. Jets 24–13. Drive: 14 plays, 62 yards, 7:03.

Fourth quarter

- NYJ – Chad Pennington 2-yard run (Mike Nugent kick), 12:51. Jets 31–13. Drive: 15 plays, 74 yards, 7:36.
- MIA – Ronnie Brown 2-yard run (Ronnie Brown run), 8:56. Jets 31–21. Drive: 8 plays, 76 yards, 3:55.
- MIA – Ronnie Brown 22-yard pass from Trent Green (Jay Feely kick), 1:15. Jets 31–28. Drive: 10 plays, 81 yards, 2:19.

Top passers

- MIA – Trent Green – 23/36, 318 yards, TD, INT
- NYJ – Chad Pennington – 15/22, 124 yards, 2 TD

Top rushers

- MIA – Ronnie Brown – 23 rushes, 112 yards, 2 TD
- NYJ – Thomas Jones – 25 rushes, 110 yards

Top receivers

- MIA – Chris Chambers – 6 receptions, 101 yards
- NYJ – Jerricho Cotchery – 5 receptions, 54 yards

Trying to snap a two-game skid, the Dolphins flew to The Meadowlands for Week 3 in an AFC East duel against the New York Jets, who were also 0–2 heading into the game. In the first quarter, the Jets flew out first with QB Chad Pennington completing a 3-yard TD pass to WR Laveranues Coles for the only score of the period. In the second quarter, Miami took the lead with RB Ronnie Brown's 1-yard TD run. However, it was short lived as on the ensuing kickoff, RB Leon Washington returned the kick 98 yards for a touchdown. The Dolphins drew closer with kicker Jay Feely's 31-yard and 39-yard field goal. However, New York responded with Pennington completing a 4-yard TD pass to TE Chris Baker.

In the third quarter, the Jets increased their lead with kicker Mike Nugent's 21-yard field goal for the only score of the period. In the fourth quarter, New York settled with Pennington getting a 2-yard TD run. Miami nearly had a comeback as Brown got a 2-yard TD run, a 2-point conversion run, and a 22-yard TD pass from QB Trent Green. However, the Jets managed to hold on to win the game.

With their third-straight loss, the Dolphins fell to 0–3.

==== Week 4: vs. Oakland Raiders ====
Quarter	1	2	3	4	Total
Raiders	14	0	7	14	35
Dolphins	0	7	10	0	17

at Dolphin Stadium, Miami Gardens, Florida

- Game time: 1:32 pm EST
- Game weather: 82 °F or 27.8 °C (Cloudy with Intermittent Rain)
- Game attendance: 70,621
- Referee: Scott Green
- TV announcers (CBS): Gus Johnson (play-by-play) and Steve Tasker (color commentator)

Still searching for their first win of the year, the Dolphins went home for a Week 4 duel with the Oakland Raiders, featuring former teammate Daunte Culpepper. The game was delayed for 30 minutes due to thunderstorms in the area.

In the first quarter, Miami trailed early as Culpepper completed a 7-yard TD pass to WR Jerry Porter. He even got a 2-yard TD run. In the second quarter, the Dolphins managed to get on the board with RB Ronnie Brown getting a 9-yard TD run for the only score of the period. In the third quarter, the 'Fins managed to get closer with kicker Jay Feely getting a 29-yard field goal, yet Oakland answered with Culpepper getting a 5-yard TD run. Miami ended the period with QB Trent Green completing a 3-yard TD pass to TE Justin Peelle. In the fourth quarter however, Culpepper delivered the final blows by hooking up with Porter again on a 27-yard TD pass and getting a 3-yard TD run.

With their fourth-straight loss, the Dolphins fell to 0–4.

==== Week 5: at Houston Texans ====
Quarter	1	2	3	4	Total
Dolphins	10	6	0	3	19
Texans	7	3	6	6	22

at Reliant Stadium, Houston, Texas

- Game time: 1:00 pm EST/12:00 pm CST
- Game weather: Game Played With Dome Closed
- Game attendance: 70,156
- Referee: Tony Corrente
- TV announcers (CBS): Kevin Harlan (play-by-play) and Rich Gannon (color commentator)

Still searching for their first win of the year, the Dolphins flew to Reliant Stadium for a Week 5 showdown with the Houston Texans. In the first quarter, Miami's struggles continued with Texans RB Ron Dayne getting a 1-yard TD run. The Dolphins answered with kicker Jay Feely getting a 23-yard field goal. However, with less than 4 minutes to go in the period, history came back to haunt QB Trent Green. During an offensive play, WR Ted Ginn Jr. was running with the ball and Green went low to block DT Travis Johnson. Trent got hit in the head with Johnson's knee, knocking him unconscious with a concussion (his second after suffering one with the Chiefs the previous year in week 1). Johnson would then get flagged for taunting the unconscious Trent Green. With Green out of the game, back-up Cleo Lemon came in and helped the Dolphins take the lead with RB Ronnie Brown getting a 3-yard TD run. In the second quarter, Miami increased its lead with Feely getting a 40-yard and a 33-yard field goal. Houston ended the half with kicker Kris Brown getting a 54-yard field goal.

In the third quarter, the Dolphins' lead was erased with Brown giving Houston a 43-yard and a 54-yard field goal. In the fourth quarter, Miami reclaimed the lead with Feely kicking a 48-yard field goal. However, the Texans would pull out the win with Brown getting not only a 20-yard field goal, but a gut-punching 57-yard field goal.

With their fifth-straight loss, not only did the Dolphins fall to 0–5, but they also suffered their first 8-straight losing streak since 1967.

==== Week 6: at Cleveland Browns ====
Quarter	1	2	3	4	Total
Dolphins	3	7	14	7	31
Browns	14	13	0	14	41

at Cleveland Browns Stadium, Cleveland, Ohio

- Game time: 1:03 pm EST
- Game weather: 58 °F or 14.4 °C (sunny)
- Game attendance: 73,198
- Referee: Larry Nemmers
- TV announcers (CBS): Ian Eagle (play-by-play) and Solomon Wilcots (color commentator)

Still looking for their first win of the year, the Dolphins flew to Cleveland Browns Stadium for a Week 6 intraconference duel with the Cleveland Browns. With QB Trent Green still suffering from a concussion from last week, back-up QB Cleo Lemon was given the start.

In the first quarter, Miami trailed early as Browns RB Jason Wright got a 1-yard TD run. The 'Fins would respond with kicker Jay Feely getting a 43-yard field goal. However, Cleveland increased its lead with QB Derek Anderson getting a 1-yard TD run. In the second quarter, Miami's struggles continued with Browns kicker Phil Dawson getting a 40-yard field goal, along with Anderson completing a 24-yard TD pass to WR Braylon Edwards. The Dolphins answered with Lemon completing a 14-yard TD pass to TE David Martin, yet Cleveland managed to get a 20-yard field goal from Dawson as time ran out.

In the third quarter, the 'Fins started to retaliate with Lemon getting a 5-yard and a 1-yard TD run. Unfortunately, in the fourth quarter, the Browns would pull away with Anderson and Edwards hooking up with each other on a 5-yard and a 16-yard TD pass. Miami's only response would be Lemon's 4-yard TD pass to Martin.

With the loss, not only did the Dolphins fall to 0–6 for the first time since 2004, but they also suffered their ninth consecutive loss, for the worst losing streak in franchise history.

Along with the St. Louis Rams, it marked the first time since 2000 (Bengals and Chargers) that two teams began a season at 0–6.

==== Week 7: vs New England Patriots ====
Quarter	1	2	3	4	Total
Patriots	14	28	0	7	49
Dolphins	0	7	0	21	28

at Dolphin Stadium, Miami Gardens, Florida

- Game time: 1:00 pm EST
- Game weather: 85 °F or 29.4 °C (sunny)
- Game attendance: 71,951
- Referee: Peter Morelli
- TV announcers (CBS): Greg Gumbel (play-by-play) and Dan Dierdorf (color commentator)

Still searching for their first win of the year, the Dolphins returned home for a Week 7 AFC East duel with the undefeated New England Patriots. In the first quarter, Miami's struggles continued as Patriots QB Tom Brady completed a 30-yard TD pass to WR Donté Stallworth and a 2-yard TD pass to TE Kyle Brady. In the second quarter, the Dolphins got their only score of the half with QB Cleo Lemon getting a 4-yard TD run. Afterwards, New England continued its pounding with CB Willie Andrews returning a kickoff 77 yards for a touchdown, along with Brady and WR Randy Moss hooking up with each other on a 35-yard and a 50-yard TD pass. The Patriots would end the half with Brady hooking up with WR Wes Welker on a 14-yard TD pass.

After a scoreless third quarter, Miami tried to make a comeback in the fourth quarter. It began with RB Patrick Cobbs getting a 1-yard TD run, along with DE Jason Taylor returning an interception 36 yards for a touchdown. However, New England made sure that they sealed their victory with Brady hooking up with Welker again on a 16-yard TD pass. Afterwards, the 'Fins ended the game with RB Jesse Chatman getting a 7-yard TD run.

With the loss, not only did the Dolphins fall to 0–7 for the first time in franchise history, but they also lost RB Ronnie Brown for the year, as he tore his ACL in the third quarter while trying to stop an interception return.

==== Week 8: vs. New York Giants ====
Quarter	1	2	3	4	Total
Giants	3	10	0	0	13
Dolphins	0	0	3	7	10

at Wembley Stadium, London, England

- Game time: 1:00 pm EST
- Game weather: 59 °F or 15 °C (overcast with light rain)
- Game attendance: 81,176
- Referee: Gerry Austin
- TV announcers (Fox): Thom Brennaman (play-by-play), Daryl Johnston (color commentator), & Tony Siragusa (sideline reporter)

Still trying to get their first win, the Dolphins flew to Wembley Stadium for their special international interconference game against the eventual Super Bowl XLII champion New York Giants. For the game, Miami was listed as the home team. In the first quarter, the Dolphins trailed early as Giants kicker Lawrence Tynes nailed a 20-yard field goal for the only score of the period. In the second quarter, Miami's struggles continued with N.Y. QB Eli Manning getting a 10-yard TD run, along with Tynes nailing a 41-yard field goal.

In the third quarter, the 'Fins started to make a comeback as former Giants kicker Jay Feely got a 29-yard field goal for the only score of the period. In the fourth quarter, Miami drew close as QB Cleo Lemon completing a 21-yard TD pass to rookie WR Ted Ginn Jr. However, New York managed to hold on to their lead for the win.

With their eleventh consecutive loss, the Dolphins entered their bye week at 0–8.

==== Week 10: vs. Buffalo Bills ====
Quarter	1	2	3	4	Total
Bills	0	0	2	11	13
Dolphins	3	0	7	0	10

at Dolphin Stadium, Miami Gardens, Florida

- Game time: 1:00 pm EDT
- Game weather: 80 °F or 26.7 °C (Partly Cloudy)
- Game attendance: 70,615
- Referee: Bill Carollo
- TV announcers (CBS): Gus Johnson (play-by-play) and Steve Tasker (color commentator)

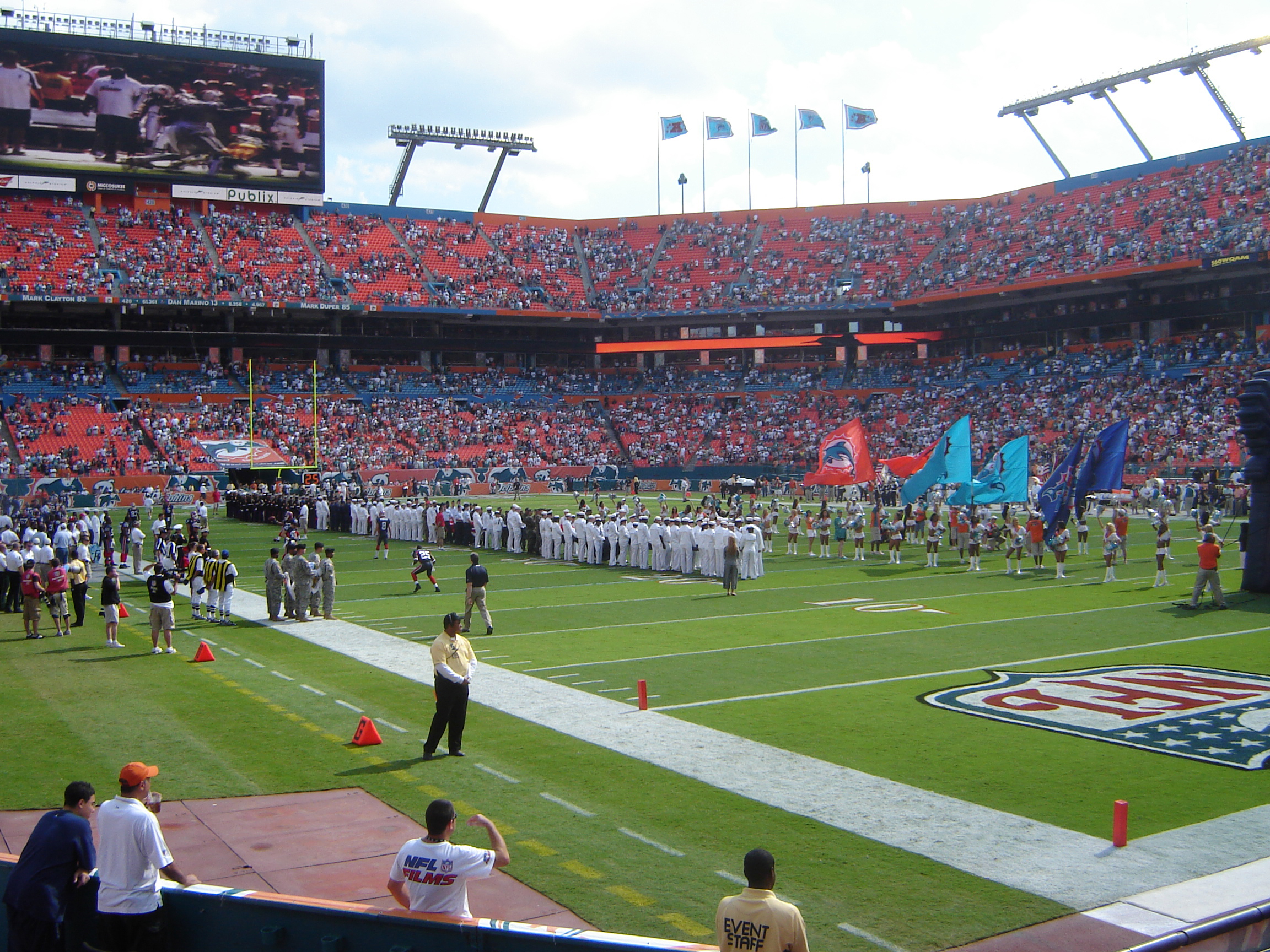
Pregame ceremony, week 10

Coming off their bye week and still looking for their first win, the Dolphins went home for an AFC East duel with the Buffalo Bills. In the first quarter, Miami struck first as kicker Jay Feely managed to get a 38-yard field goal for the only score of the period. In the third quarter, the Bills got on the board with DE Chris Kelsay sacking QB Cleo Lemon in the endzone for a safety. Fortunately, the 'Fins responded with Lemon getting a 5-yard TD run. Unfortunately, in the fourth quarter, Miami's year-long struggles continued as Buffalo RB Marshawn Lynch got a 3-yard TD run, along with a 2-point conversion run. Later, the Bills sealed the win as kicker Rian Lindell nailed the game-winning 34-yard field goal.

With their ninth-straight loss, the Dolphins fell to 0–9, despite outgaining Buffalo in total offensive yards (269 to 214) and time of possession (36:59 to 23:01).

This marked the fifth occasion during the season that Miami lost by 3 points.

With the Rams' win over the Saints that same week the Dolphins became the NFL's only winless team.

==== Week 11: at Philadelphia Eagles ====
Quarter	1	2	3	4	Total
Dolphins	0	7	0	0	7
Eagles	0	3	7	7	17

at Lincoln Financial Field, Philadelphia

- Game time: 1:00 pm EST
- Game weather: 42 °F or 5.6 °C (cloudy)
- Game attendance: 68,934
- Referee: Jerome Boger
- TV announcers (CBS): Kevin Harlan (play-by-play) and Rich Gannon (color commentator)

Still searching for their first win, the Dolphins flew to Lincoln Financial Field for a Week 11 interconference duel with the Philadelphia Eagles. This game would mark the NFL debut of rookie QB John Beck.

After a scoreless first quarter, Miami got the first splash as rookie WR/KR/PR Ted Ginn Jr. returned a punt 87 yards for a touchdown (the first TD punt return for the Dolphins since 2000). The Eagles would end the half with kicker David Akers nailing a 34-yard field goal. In the third quarter, Miami's year-long struggles continued as Philadelphia took the lead with RB Correll Buckhalter getting an 8-yard TD run for the only score of the period. In the fourth quarter, the Eagles sealed the win with QB A. J. Feeley (a former Dolphin) completing a 4-yard TD pass to WR Jason Avant.

With the loss, the Dolphins fell to 0–10, and were both swept by the NFC East and they were eliminated from playoff contention for the 5th consecutive year. This would be the first time since the 2001 Detroit Lions (Note: The 2001 Lions actually began their season 0–12 before winning.) that a team began a season 0–10.

==== Week 12: at Pittsburgh Steelers ====
Quarter	1	2	3	4	Total
Dolphins	0	0	0	0	0
Steelers	0	0	0	3	3

at Heinz Field, Pittsburgh, Pennsylvania

- Game time: 8:55 pm EST (Monday Night Football; game was delayed 25 minutes due to lightning)
- Game weather: 59 °F or 15 °C, rain and thunderstorms
- Game attendance: 57,704
- Referee: Jeff Triplette
- TV announcers (ESPN): Mike Tirico (play by play), Ron Jaworski and Tony Kornheiser (color commentators), Suzy Kolber and Michele Tafoya (sideline reporters)

Game information

First quarter

- No scoring plays

Second quarter

- No scoring plays

Third quarter

- No scoring plays

Fourth quarter

- PIT – Jeff Reed 24-yard field goal, 0:17. Steelers 3–0. Drive: 9 plays, 36 yards, 3:56.

Top passers

- MIA – John Beck – 14/23, 132 yards
- PIT – Ben Roethlisberger – 18/21, 165 yards, INT

Top rushers

- MIA – Jesse Chatman – 11 rushes, 17 yards
- PIT – Willie Parker – 24 rushes, 84 yards

Top receivers

- MIA – Marty Booker – 5 receptions, 54 yards
- PIT – Hines Ward – 9 receptions, 88 yards

Still trying to get their first win of the year, the Dolphins flew to Heinz Field for a Week 12 Monday Night intraconference duel with the Pittsburgh Steelers. For LB Joey Porter, it would be his first game in Pittsburgh against his former team. This would also mark the NFL return of RB Ricky Williams.

Playing in heavy rain with a delay due to lightning, the game (also known as the Heinz Field Fiasco) remained scoreless through over 59 minutes, becoming the longest scoreless tie since 1943. The game would end with Miami falling yet again as Steelers’ kicker Jeff Reed got the only points of the game on a fourth-quarter 24-yard field goal with 0:17 left.

With the loss, not only did the Dolphins fall to 0–11, but this would also mark a franchise worst, sixth losses by 3 points or less.

In his first NFL game since New Year's Day of 2006, reinstated running back Ricky Williams had only six carries for 15 yards. He left the game in the second quarter with a torn pectoral muscle after fumbling and being stepped on by Lawrence Timmons. Williams would later be placed on the injured reserve list, ending his season.

This 3–0 score remains the lowest scoring affair in the history of Monday Night Football.

==== Week 13: vs. New York Jets ====
Quarter	1	2	3	4	Total
Jets	7	13	3	17	40
Dolphins	3	10	0	0	13

- Game time: 1:00 pm EST
- Game weather: 81 °F or 27.2 °C (sunny)
- Game attendance: 71,109
- Referee: Mike Carey
- TV announcers (CBS): Gus Johnson (play-by-play) and Steve Tasker (color commentator)

Still trying to get their first win of the year, the Dolphins went home for a Week 13 AFC East rematch with the throwback-clad New York Jets. In the first quarter, Miami trailed early as Jets RB Leon Washington got an 18-yard TD run. The Dolphins ended the period with kicker Jay Feely getting a 53-yard field goal. In the second quarter, Miami drew closer as Feely kicked a 44-yard field goal, yet New York replied with kicker Mike Nugent getting a 29-yard field goal. Afterwards, the Dolphins took the lead as CB Michael Lehan returned a fumble 43 yards for a touchdown. However, the Jets regained the lead with QB Kellen Clemens completing a 19-yard TD pass to WR Brad Smith, along with Nugent kicking a 40-yarder and a 35-yard field goal.

In the third quarter, New York increased their lead with Nugent kicking a 35-yard field goal for the only score of the period. In the fourth quarter, the Jets sealed the win with RB Thomas Jones getting a 1-yard TD run, Nugent nailing a 26-yard field goal, and Washington getting a 12-yard TD run.

With the loss, Miami fell to 0–12, and had lost 15 straight games dating back to game 14 of 2006. This also marked the first time since the 2001 Detroit Lions that a team began a season 0–12.

==== Week 14: at Buffalo Bills ====
Quarter	1	2	3	4	Total
Dolphins	7	0	10	0	17
Bills	24	7	0	7	38

at Ralph Wilson Stadium, Orchard Park, New York

- Game time: 1:00 pm EST
- Game weather: 30 °F or −1.1 °C (overcast)
- Game attendance: 71,018
- Referee: Scott Green
- TV announcers (CBS): Ian Eagle (play-by-play) & Solomon Wilcots (color commentator)

Still trying to get their first win, the Dolphins flew to Ralph Wilson Stadium for a Week 14 AFC East rematch with the Buffalo Bills. In the first quarter, Miami's year-long struggles continued as Bills QB Trent Edwards completed a 13-yard and a 28-yard TD pass to TE Robert Royal, while rookie QB John Beck had the ball slip out of his hand and have it caught by Buffalo Safety George Wilson, who would return it 20 yards for a touchdown. The Dolphins would get on the board with RB Samkon Gado getting a 12-yard TD run, yet the Bills answered with kicker Rian Lindell getting a 51-yard field goal. In the second quarter, Buffalo continued its dominance as Edwards completed a 9-yard TD pass to WR Lee Evans for the only score of the period.

In the third quarter, the 'Fins tried to rally as Gado got a 20-yard TD run, while kicker Jay Feely got a 41-yard field goal. However, in the fourth quarter, the Bills sealed the win with Edwards and Evans hooking up with each other again on a 70-yard TD pass.

With yet another loss, the Dolphins fell to 0–13.

This would mark their 16th-straight loss, dating back to last season. Also, Miami became the 5th team in NFL history to begin a season at 0–13.

Despite getting the start, Beck only lasted for the first three series, due to a dismal performance (1/2 for 6 yards).

==== Week 15: vs. Baltimore Ravens ====
Quarter	1	2	3	4	OT	Total
Ravens	3	10	0	3	0	16
Dolphins	0	3	7	6	6	22

at Dolphin Stadium, Miami Gardens, Florida

- Game time: 1:00 pm EST
- Game weather: 79 °F or 26.1 °C (mostly cloudy)
- Game attendance: 70,287
- Referee: John Parry
- TV announcers (CBS): Kevin Harlan (play-by-play) & Rich Gannon (color commentator)

Game information

First quarter

- BAL – Matt Stover 27-yard field goal, 9:32. Ravens 3–0. Drive: 10 plays, 51 yards, 5:32.

Second quarter

- BAL – Matt Stover 39-yard field goal, 10:08. Ravens 6–0. Drive: 11 plays, 42 yards, 4:42.
- MIA – Jay Feely 23-yard field goal, 3:21. Ravens 6–3. Drive: 13 plays, 69 yards, 6:45.
- BAL – Derrick Mason 17-yard pass from Kyle Boller (Matt Stover kick), 0:47. Ravens 13–3. Drive: 8 plays, 73 yards, 2:30.

Third quarter

- MIA – Samkon Gado 7-yard run (Jay Feely kick), 6:51. Ravens 13–10. Drive: 10 plays, 50 yards, 4:24.

Fourth quarter

- MIA – Jay Feely 22-yard field goal, 12:09. Tied 13–13. Drive: 15 plays, 82 yards, 7:38.
- MIA – Jay Feely 29-yard field goal, 2:00. Dolphins 16–13. Drive: 11 plays, 33 yards, 4:02.
- BAL – Matt Stover 18-yard field goal, 0:12. Tied 16–16. Drive: 11 plays, 60 yards, 1:48.

Overtime

- MIA – Greg Camarillo 64-yard pass from Cleo Lemon, 8:26. Dolphins 22–16. Drive: 3 plays, 66 yards, 1:41.

Top passers

- BAL – Kyle Boller – 10/19, 159 yards, TD, INT
- MIA – Cleo Lemon – 23/39, 315 yards, TD

Top rushers

- BAL – Willis McGahee – 29 rushes, 104 yards
- MIA – Samkon Gado – 18 rushes, 43 yards, TD

Top receivers

- BAL – Devard Darling – 4 receptions, 56 yards
- MIA – Greg Camarillo – 3 receptions, 109 yards, TD

Still in the hunt for their first win of the year, the Dolphins went home for a Week 15 intraconference duel with the Baltimore Ravens. In the first quarter, Miami trailed early as Ravens kicker Matt Stover managed to get a 27-yard field goal for the only score of the period. In the second quarter, the Dolphins continued to trail as Stover kicked a 39-yard field goal. Afterwards, the 'Fins got on the board as kicker Jay Feely managed to get a 23-yard field goal. Baltimore would end the half with QB Kyle Boller completing a 17-yard TD pass to WR Derrick Mason.

In the third quarter, Miami began to gain steam as RB Samkon Gado managed to get a 7-yard TD run for the only score of the period. In the fourth quarter, the Dolphins took the lead as Feely kicked a 29-yard and an 18-yard field goal. Afterwards, the Ravens tied the game with Stover nailing an 18-yard field goal. In overtime, the Dolphins nearly lost again as Stover missed a potential game winning 44 yard field goal. However, the demons were lifted as QB Cleo Lemon completed the game-winning 64-yard TD pass to WR Greg Camarillo. Soon after players and coaches rejoiced in the locker room after a long-awaited first win.

With the win, not only did Miami improve to 1–13, but it also snapped a 16-game losing streak dating back to last season's December 10 win over the New England Patriots, notching their first win of the 2007 season and avoiding their becoming the first team in NFL history to go 0–16. This was their only win in a 1–15 season and would keep them from being possibly labeled as the worst team in NFL history. They also avoided having to play with a 0–14 record against a New England Patriots team carrying the complementary 14–0 record, and widely expected to become the first team to match the perfect season feat originally posted by the 1972 Dolphins.

Cleo Lemon got his first career 300-yard game, as he completed 23 out of 39 passes for 315 yards and 1 touchdown.

==== Week 16: at New England Patriots ====
Quarter	1	2	3	4	Total
Dolphins	0	0	7	0	7
Patriots	7	21	0	0	28

at Gillette Stadium, Foxboro, Massachusetts

- Game time: 4:15 pm EST
- Game weather: 43 °F or 6.1 °C (cloudy and mild with rain)
- Game attendance: 68,756
- Referee: Ron Winter
- TV announcers (CBS): Jim Nantz (play-by-play) and Phil Simms (color commentator)

Game information

First quarter

- NE – Randy Moss 11-yard pass from Tom Brady (Stephen Gostkowski kick), 8:47. Patriots 7–0. Drive: 10 plays, 75 yards, 5:15.

Second quarter

- NE – Randy Moss 1-yard pass from Tom Brady (Stephen Gostkowski kick), 13:32. Patriots 14–0. Drive: 5 plays, 79 yards, 2:10.
- NE – Laurence Maroney 59-yard run (Stephen Gostkowski kick), 10:04. Patriots 21–0. Drive: 3 plays, 69 yards, 1:20.
- NE – Jabar Gaffney 48-yard pass from Tom Brady (Stephen Gostkowski kick), 3:33. Patriots 28–0. Drive: 6 plays, 80 yards, 3:00.

Third quarter

- MIA – Greg Camarillo 21-yard pass from Cleo Lemon (Jay Feely kick), 1:13. Patriots 28–7. Drive: 7 plays, 65 yards, 3:47.

Fourth quarter

- No scoring plays

Top passers

- MIA – Cleo Lemon – 18/41, 171 yards, TD
- NE – Tom Brady – 18/33, 215 yards, 3 TD, 2 INT

Top rushers

- MIA – Lorenzo Booker – 8 rushes, 56 yards
- NE – Laurence Maroney – 14 rushes, 156 yards, TD

Top receivers

- MIA – David Martin – 2 receptions, 31 yards
- NE – Jabar Gaffney – 5 receptions, 82 yards, TD

Coming off their home win over the Ravens, the Dolphins flew to Gillette Stadium for a Week 16 AFC East rematch with the undefeated New England Patriots. In the first quarter, Miami trailed early as Patriots QB Tom Brady completed an 11-yard TD pass to WR Randy Moss for the only score of the period. In the second quarter, New England pulled away with Brady & Moss hooked up with each other again on a 1-yard TD pass, RB Laurence Maroney getting a 59-yard TD run, and Brady completing a 48-yard TD pass to WR Jabar Gaffney. In the third quarter, the Dolphins would get on the board as QB Cleo Lemon completed a 21-yard TD pass to WR Greg Camarillo. However, the Patriots' defense took over for the rest of the game.

==== Week 17: vs. Cincinnati Bengals ====
Quarter	1	2	3	4	Total
Bengals	7	14	7	10	38
Dolphins	3	7	0	15	25

at Dolphin Stadium, Miami Gardens, Florida

- Game time: 1:00 pm EST
- Game weather: 81 °F (27 °C)
- Game attendance: 70,461
- Referee: Walt Coleman
- TV announcers (CBS): Gus Johnson (play-by-play) and Steve Tasker (color commentator)

Hoping to finish their horrendous season on a high note, the Dolphins went home for a Week 17 intraconference duel with the Cincinnati Bengals. In the first quarter, Miami struck first as kicker Jay Feely managed to get a 49-yard field goal. The Bengals would take the lead as QB Carson Palmer completed a 2-yard TD pass to WR Chad Johnson. In the second quarter, the 'Fins regained the lead as QB Cleo Lemon completed a 5-yard TD to rookie WR Ted Ginn Jr., yet Cincinnati retook the lead with Palmer completing a 70-yard TD pass to Chad Johnson and a 4-yard TD pass to WR Antonio Chatman.

In the third quarter, the Bengals increased their lead with Safety Chinedum Ndukwe returning a fumble 54 yards for a touchdown. In the fourth quarter, the Dolphins tried to come back as rookie QB John Beck got a 2-yard TD run, but Cincinnati pulled away as RB Kenny Watson got a 2-yard TD run and kicker Shayne Graham nailing a 30-yard field goal. Miami ended the game with Beck completing a 22-yard TD pass to WR Derek Hagan.

With the loss, the Dolphins finished dead last in the NFL at a franchise worst 1–15 (0-4 against the AFC North) and 0-8 on the road. As a result of this loss, the Dolphins clinched the #1 pick for the 2008 NFL Draft via becoming the 8th team in NFL history (first since the 2001 Panthers) to finish 1-15. (Note: The previous seven had been the 1980 Saints, the 1989 Cowboys, the 1990 Patriots, the 1991 Colts, the 1996 Jets, the 2000 Chargers, and the 2001 Panthers. The 2009 Rams, the 2016 Browns, and the 2020 Jaguars would later finish 1–15, although they had been surpassed by the 2008 Lions and 2017 Browns who finished winless in 16 games.) As of 2025, this remains the last time the Dolphins finished with less than 3 wins in a season.

=== Standings ===
AFC East
	W	L	T	PCT	DIV	CONF	PF	PA	STK
^{(1)} New England Patriots	16	0	0	1.000	6–0	12–0	589	274	W16
Buffalo Bills	7	9	0	.438	4–2	6–6	252	354	L3
New York Jets	4	12	0	.250	2–4	4–8	268	355	W1
Miami Dolphins	1	15	0	.063	0–6	1–11	267	437	L2

=== Transactions ===
==== September ====
During the Dolphins' Week 1 loss to the Redskins, starting strong safety Yeremiah Bell suffered a torn Achilles' tendon. As a result, he was placed on season-ending Injured Reserve on September 11. The team also waived backup defensive end Akbar Gbaja-Biamila, who did not play in the season opener. With two open spots on the 53-man roster, the team signed contracts with veteran safeties and Donovin Darius and Lamont Thompson. They were waived by the Oakland Raiders and Tennessee Titans, respectively, at the end of the preseason. The same day, rookie linebacker Kelvin Smith, who was waived four days earlier, was re-signed to the team's practice squad.

==== October ====
On the first day of the month, linebacker Robert McCune was waived from injured reserve. Linebacker Jim Maxwell suffered the same fate eight days later.

The Dolphins' active roster remained unchanged for nearly a month after the season opener. The first transactions since came on October 10, when defensive tackle Sam Rayburn was signed and safety Lamont Thompson was released. Thompson appeared in one game for the Dolphins after being signed on September 11 and made one tackle. Rayburn went to training camp with the San Francisco 49ers in 2007 after spending the first four years of his career with the Philadelphia Eagles.

On October 16, Miami traded their No. 1 receiver, seven-year veteran Chris Chambers, to the San Diego Chargers in exchange for a second-round pick in the 2008 NFL draft. In 100 games with the Dolphins since being drafted in the second round of the 2001 NFL draft, Chambers caught 405 passes for 5,688 yards and 43 touchdowns. He earned his first Pro Bowl selection in 2005. In the team's first six games of the 2007 season, he caught 31 passes for 415 yards with no touchdowns. On the same day, the team also released safety Donovin Darius and placed defensive tackle Chase Page on injured reserve.

To fill the three roster spots vacated by Chambers, Darius and Page, the Dolphins signed three defensive linemen – tackles Anthony Bryant and Jesse Mahelona and end Derreck Robinson. Bryant was on the practice squad of the Baltimore Ravens prior to his signing. Mahelona and Robinson had been released by the Tennessee Titans and San Diego Chargers, respectively, in September.

After suffering a concussion in the team's Week 5 game against the Houston Texans, starting quarterback Trent Green was placed on injured reserve on October 20. Wide receiver Kerry Reed – an undrafted free agent from Michigan State – was promoted to the active roster from the practice squad.

Three days later, defensive tackle Jesse Mahelona was waived after being inactive for one game with the team. Starting running back Ronnie Brown and starting free safety Renaldo Hill were both placed on injured reserve with torn ACLs suffered in the team's Week 7 game against the New England Patriots. Brown was leading the NFL in offensive yards at the time of the injury.

On October 24, two of the three roster spots were filled from outside the organization as the Dolphins signed defensive end Quentin Moses and safety Lance Schulters. Moses was originally drafted by the Oakland Raiders in the third round of the 2007 NFL draft and was claimed off waivers by the Arizona Cardinals on September 2. He was inactive for six games before being waived. Schulters spent the latter part of the 2006 season with the Atlanta Falcons after starting for the Dolphins in 2005. Tight end Aaron Halterman was also promoted from the practice squad.

Additionally, running back Samkon Gado was claimed off waivers from the Houston Texans. The team was granted a one-game roster exemption, as Gado was unable to meet the Dolphins in time for their October 28 game in London. On October 30, defensive tackle Sam Rayburn was waived to make room for Gado on the active roster.

The Dolphins also filled two practice squad spots vacated by Reed and Halterman with quarterback Casey Bramlet and tight end Buck Ortega. A seventh-round pick by the Cincinnati Bengals in 2004, Bramlet spent 2007 training camp with the Atlanta Falcons. Ortega had been waived by the Cleveland Browns in late August.

==== November ====
On November 6, the Dolphins placed linebacker Abraham Wright – one of the team's seventh-round picks in 2007 – on injured reserve with a knee injury. He had inactive for all eight of the team's games in 2007. Practice squad tight end Buck Ortega was released the same day. The following day, defensive back Jereme Perry was signed to the active roster an undrafted free agent wide receiver Stefan Logan (South Dakota) was signed to the practice squad. Perry had spent the 2006 season and 2007 training camp with the Cleveland Browns.

On November 14, safety Travares Tillman was placed on injured reserve with a knee injury. Tuff Harris – an undrafted defensive back from Montana – was promoted from the practice squad to the active roster. Placekicker Matt Prater, who spent training camp with the Dolphins, was re-signed to the practice squad. Prater briefly held the kicking job for the Atlanta Falcons, but was waived on September 19 after going 1-for-4 on field goal in two games.

On November 19, running back Ricky Williams was reinstated by the NFL. Williams had been suspended since the 2006 offseason for his fourth violation of the league substance abuse policy. The team was granted a one-week roster exemption for Williams.

Williams' return to the Dolphins did not last long, however. After being activated by the Dolphins when running back Samkon Gado was waived on November 26, Williams suffered a torn pectoral muscle against the Pittsburgh Steelers. He was placed on injured reserve on November 28 and Gado was re-signed.

Despite returning to practice on November 6, offensive lineman Joe Toledo – on the physically unable-to-perform list since training camp – was unable to return to the active roster for the 2007 season. His practice period expired on November 27, forcing him to remain on the PUP list for the remainder of the season.

==== December ====
On December 4, starting middle linebacker Zach Thomas was placed on injured reserve with lingering effects of a concussion suffered earlier in the season. Safety Cameron Worrell became the third starting strong safety to be placed on injured reserve after suffering a torn ACL in the team's Week 13 game against the New York Jets. Wide receiver Kerry Reed was also waived by the team after spending six games on the active roster.

To fill two of the roster spots, linebacker Kelvin Smith and offensive tackle Julius Wilson were promoted to the active roster from the practice squad. Both rookies, Smith had originally been drafted in the seventh round out of Syracuse in 2007 while Wilson was signed as an undrafted free agent out of UAB. Filling the third spot was rookie linebacker Mark Washington, who was signed off the practice squad of the San Francisco 49ers.

Wide receiver Kerry Reed was re-signed to the practice squad after being waived by the team, and linebacker Marcello Church was signed to the practice squad as well. Church went undrafted out of Florida State in 2006 and had spent part of the 2007 offseason with the Pittsburgh Steelers.

=== Awards and honors ===
Dolphins players received two weekly honors during the 2007 season. Wide receiver Ted Ginn Jr. won Diet Pepsi NFL Rookie of the Week honors for his performance against the Philadelphia Eagles in Week 11, during which he returned a punt 87 yard for a touchdown (the first of his career) and also caught four passes for 52 yards.

In Week 15, quarterback Cleo Lemon won AFC Offensive Player of the Week honors for leading the Dolphins to their first victory of the season against the Baltimore Ravens. In the game, Lemon went 23-for-39 for 315 yards and threw a game-winning 64-yard touchdown pass to Greg Camarillo in overtime.

On December 18, it was announced that defensive end Jason Taylor was selected to the 2008 Pro Bowl – his fourth straight selection and sixth overall. Taylor finished the 2007 season with 56 tackles (47 solo), 11 sacks, four passes defensed and an interception returned for a touchdown.

== See also ==
- 2007 NFL season

== Notes ==
Preceded by 2006 Miami Dolphins season	2007 Miami Dolphins season	Succeeded by 2008 Miami Dolphins season
