= Ryan Flinn =

Ryan Flinn may refer to:

- Ryan Flinn (American football) (born 1980), former American football punter
- Ryan Flinn (ice hockey) (born 1980), Canadian ice hockey winger
