= Geoff Pope (American football) =

American football player (born 1984)

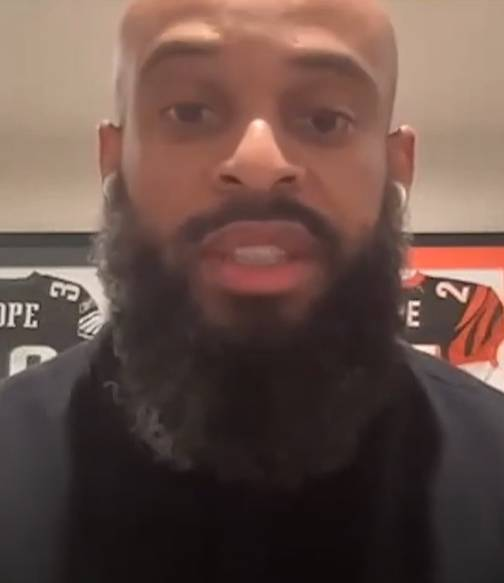
- Pope in 2023

No. 33, 24, 30
- Position: Cornerback

Personal information
- Born: June 21, 1984 (age 42); Detroit, Michigan, U.S.
- Listed height: 6 ft 0 in (1.83 m)
- Listed weight: 190 lb (86 kg)

Career information
- High school: University of Detroit Jesuit
- College: Howard
- NFL draft: 2007: undrafted

Career history
- Miami Dolphins (2007)*; New York Giants (2007); Cincinnati Bengals (2008–2009); Philadelphia Eagles (2009)
- * Offseason or practice squad member only

Awards and highlights
- Super Bowl champion (XLII); Second-team All-MEAC (2006)

Career NFL statistics
- Total tackles: 4
- Pass deflections: 1
- Stats at Pro Football Reference

Geoffrey Glenn Pope (born June 21, 1984) is an American former professional football player who was a cornerback in the National Football League (NFL). He played college football for the Howard Bison and was signed by the Miami Dolphins as an undrafted free agent in 2007.

Pope was also a member of the New York Giants, Cincinnati Bengals and Philadelphia Eagles. He earned a Super Bowl ring with the Giants in Super Bowl XLII over the heavily favored New England Patriots.

== Early life ==
Pope attended the University of Detroit Jesuit High School and Academy where he was a track and football standout. He ran the 100m dash in 10.38 seconds, which is the high school and meet record.

== College career ==
=== Eastern Michigan ===
Pope originally attended Eastern Michigan, where he appeared in 25 games and racked up 24 tackles and two pass breakups from 2002 to 2004. Pope red-shirted his freshman year. In 2003, he clocked 4.35 seconds in the 40 yard dash during underclassman testing. Pope also ran indoor track in the offseason and placed 3rd in the 60 meter dash (6.87 seconds) at the 2004 MAC Indoor Championships. Shortly after finishing all conference at the 2004 indoor championships, Pope ran the 40 yard dash in 4.29 seconds for underclassman testing. He tore his quadriceps in off-season workouts that spring and clashed with coaches about his rehab program and treatment. Pope missed half the 2004 season due to his injury. In 2005, Pope was 100% healthy and ran the 40m dash in 4.20 seconds on junior day. He decided not to run track and focus solely on football. Despite being healthy, Pope was the last corner on the depth chart in 2005 during spring practices. Pope decided to transfer that summer.

=== Howard ===
In 2005, Pope transferred to Howard. He played 22 games over two seasons for the Bison, totaling 76 tackles, seven pass breakups and four interceptions. He broke his foot in training camp and broke his hand mid-season; however, he did not miss a game his senior season. Pope earned all conference honors as a Bison.

== Professional career ==
=== Pre-draft ===
Pope ran a 4.25 40-yard dash at his Pro Day prior to the 2007 NFL draft.

=== Miami Dolphins ===
After going undrafted in the 2007 NFL draft, Pope signed a free agent contract with the Miami Dolphins.

On the Dolphins' first official depth chart of training camp, released August 6, Pope was listed as the seventh and final cornerback. In the team's first preseason game against the Jacksonville Jaguars on August 11, Pope registered two tackles while playing primarily on special teams and on defense in the second half.

Pope made it through the first round of cuts but was released by the team on September 1 as the roster was trimmed to 53 for the regular season. The following day, the New York Giants signed Pope to their practice squad.

=== New York Giants ===
Pope spent the entire 2007 regular season on the Giants' practice squad. With cornerback Sam Madison injured, the Giants activated Pope from the practice squad on December 31. He replaced safety Craig Dahl on the roster. Pope was inactive for the team's Wild Card contest, but made his NFL debut on January 13 in the team's divisional round matchup against the Dallas Cowboys. He saw extensive playing time on defensive and special teams, recording one tackle in the contest. On January 20, Pope participated in the NFC Championship game against the Green Bay Packers at Lambeau Field and recorded one tackle.

Pope was released by the Giants during final cuts on August 30, 2008. The next day he was signed to the teams' practice squad, only to be released the following day on September 1.

=== Cincinnati Bengals ===
The same day he was released from the Giants' practice squad, Pope was signed to the Cincinnati Bengals' practice squad on September 1, 2008. He was promoted to the active roster on September 16 and played in 8 games that season. Pope played in 4 games in 2009, but was waived by the Bengals on September 23 after the team signed cornerback Jamar Fletcher. He was re-signed to the practice squad the following day.

Pope was released from the Bengals on October 8, 2009, and re-signed to the practice squad on October 9.

=== Philadelphia Eagles ===
Pope was signed off the Bengals practice squad on November 24 by the Philadelphia Eagles. He was waived on September 3, 2010.
