= Marvin Allen (wide receiver) =

English American football player (born 1983)

No. 16, 13
- Position: Wide receiver

Personal information
- Born: 5 March 1983 (age 43); Dorking, Surrey, England
- Listed height: 5 ft 10 in (1.78 m)
- Listed weight: 192 lb (87 kg)

Career information
- College: Northwood University

Career history
- London Olympians (2001–2004); Frankfurt Galaxy (2005–2006); Rhein Fire (2006); Amsterdam Admirals (2006); Pittsburgh Steelers (2006)*; Rhein Fire (2007); Miami Dolphins (2007)*; Pittsburgh Steelers (2008)*; London Warriors (2008–2011)
- * Offseason or practice squad member only

Awards and highlights
- Super Bowl champion (XLIII); 3× BritBowl champion (2001–2003)

Marvin Allen (born 5 March 1983) is an English former American football wide receiver. He was raised in Croydon, Greater London, England. He is a coach for the London Warriors. He was first signed by the London Olympians in 2001.

Allen has also played for the Frankfurt Galaxy, Rhein Fire and Amsterdam Admirals of NFL Europa. He was an international practice squad player for the Pittsburgh Steelers in 2006, the Miami Dolphins in 2007 and the Steelers again in 2008.

== Professional career ==
Allen started his career with the London Olympians in 2001- 2004. In 2005, Allen played for the Frankfurt Galaxy and he caught 12 passes for 136 yards (11.3 yards per catch) with a long of 21 during his rookie year. In 2006, Allen played for three teams in NFL Europa. During the regular season he played for the Frankfurt Galaxy and Rhein Fire. He played for the Amsterdam Admirals in Yello Strom World Bowl XIV. He caught six passes for 79 yards (13.2 yards per catch).

Allen was signed by the Steelers in July 2006. He was put on the practice squad in accordance with the NFL International Development Practice Squad program. After a season with the Miami Dolphins in the same role, he went back to the Pittsburgh Steelers for the 2008 season. He remained on the practice squad with Pittsburgh throughout the regular and post-season. He was on the team sideline during Super Bowl XLIII when the team defeated the Arizona Cardinals.

Allen played for the London Warriors as a wide receiver from 2008 to 2011, and is now on the team's coaching staff.

== Personal ==
Allen is the son of NFL Europa's Director of International Player and Football Development, Tony Allen.
