= Jim Maxwell (American football) =

American gridiron football player (born 1981)

No. 57, 53, 50, 58
- Position: Linebacker

Personal information
- Born: August 8, 1981 (age 45); Johnsonville, South Carolina, U.S.
- Listed height: 6 ft 4 in (1.93 m)
- Listed weight: 240 lb (109 kg)

Career information
- High school: Johnsonville
- College: Gardner–Webb
- NFL draft: 2004: undrafted

Career history
- New York Giants (2004); San Francisco 49ers (2005); Miami Dolphins (2006–2007); Cincinnati Bengals (2007–2008); Saskatchewan Roughriders (2010)*
- * Offseason or practice squad member only

Awards and highlights
- First-team All-Big South (2003); Big South Student-Athlete of the Year (2003)

Career NFL statistics
- Total tackles: 39
- Sacks: 1
- Fumble recoveries: 1
- Stats at Pro Football Reference

James Maxwell (born August 8, 1981) is an American former professional football player who was a linebacker in the National Football League (NFL). He played college football for the Gardner–Webb Runnin' Bulldogs and was signed by the New York Giants as an undrafted free agent in 2004.

Maxwell also played for the San Francisco 49ers, Miami Dolphins, and Cincinnati Bengals.

== Early life ==
Maxwell attended Johnsonville High School in Johnsonville, South Carolina, where he was a letterman in football. Maxwell graduated from Johnsonville in 1999 as salutatorian.

== College career ==
Maxwell started all 42 games in which he played during his four-year collegiate career at Gardner–Webb University from 2000 to 2003. He finished his career with 306 tackles, 10 sacks, four interceptions, 11 fumble recoveries and eight forced fumbles. He was a first-team All-Big South Conference selection as a senior in 2003 when he tallied 116 tackles, three sacks and an interception. He graduated with a degree in business administration.

== Professional career ==
=== New York Giants ===
Maxwell went undrafted in the 2004 NFL draft and was signed as an undrafted free agent by the New York Giants on April 27, 2004. He was waived by the team following training camp on August 30 but was re-signed to the practice squad. Maxwell was promoted to the active roster on September 14 and remained there the final 14 games of the regular season. He recorded seven tackles and a sack on defense and 11 stops on special teams.

Prior to the 2005 season, Maxwell was recognized by the NFL for completing his college studies and earning an MBA from Gardner–Webb. He was able to earn the degree by taking advantage of the Continuing Education Program, offered by the NFL Player Development Department.

In 2005, Maxwell once again was waived by the Giants at the conclusion of the preseason.

=== San Francisco 49ers ===
On October 11, the San Francisco 49ers signed him to their active roster, where he stayed for 11 games. On the year, he recorded seven tackles on defense, and finished third on team on with 14 stops on special teams. He also recovered a fumble on special teams.

Maxwell was waived by the 49ers on September 2, 2006.

=== Miami Dolphins ===
With linebacker Derrick Pope nursing a hamstring injury prior to Week 6, the Dolphins signed Maxwell to their active roster on October 11. He ended up playing in a reserve role eight games during the season and was inactive three times. He made his Dolphin debut in a special teams role on October 15 against the New York Jets. He finished the season with three solo tackles and one assisted tackle.

=== Cincinnati Bengals ===
Jim Maxwell's debut with the Cincinnati Bengals came on December 15, 2007, in a 13–20 loss at San Francisco. Despite the team loss, Maxwell recorded his first two tackles as a Bengal. He was released during final cuts on August 30, 2008.

The Bengals re-signed Maxwell on December 17 after linebacker Victor Hobson was waived.
