= Courtney Bryan =

American football player (born 1984)

No. 47
- Position: Safety

Personal information
- Born: October 2, 1984 (age 42); San Jose, California, U.S.
- Listed height: 6 ft 0 in (1.83 m)
- Listed weight: 202 lb (92 kg)

Career information
- High school: Lincoln (San Jose)
- College: New Mexico State
- NFL draft: 2007: undrafted

Career history
- Miami Dolphins (2007–2008); Saskatchewan Roughriders (2011)

Awards and highlights
- Second-team All-WAC (2006)

Career NFL statistics
- Games played: 19
- Total tackles: 14
- Fumble recoveries: 1
- Stats at Pro Football Reference

Courtney Jamaal Bryan (born October 2, 1984) is an American former professional football player who was a safety in the National Football League (NFL). He played college football for the New Mexico State Aggies. He was signed by the Miami Dolphins as an undrafted free agent in 2007.

He is the younger brother of NFL defensive end Copeland Bryan.

== Early life ==
Bryan was born in San Jose, California, where he attended Lincoln High School and was a letterman in football, basketball, and track. Now he works as a Sheriff at Santa Clara County.
