= Chase Page =

American football player (born 1983)

No. 95
- Position: Defensive tackle

Personal information
- Born: May 20, 1983 (age 43); Charleston, South Carolina, U.S.
- Listed height: 6 ft 4 in (1.93 m)
- Listed weight: 295 lb (134 kg)

Career information
- High school: Summerville (Summerville, South Carolina)
- College: North Carolina
- NFL draft: 2006: 7th round, 225th overall pick

Career history
- San Diego Chargers (2006)*; Miami Dolphins (2006–2007)
- * Offseason or practice squad member only

Career NFL statistics
- Total tackles: 5
- Stats at Pro Football Reference

Chase Frederick Page (born May 20, 1983) is an American former professional football player who was a defensive tackle for the Miami Dolphins of the National Football League (NFL). He was selected by the San Diego Chargers in the seventh round (225th overall) of the 2006 NFL draft. He played college football for the North Carolina Tar Heels.

== Early life ==
Page attended Summerville High School in Summerville, South Carolina, during his senior season after transferring from Wando High School in Charleston and Tuckahoe Middle School in Richmond, Virginia. He did not play football until his sophomore season. As a senior, he helped lead Summerville to an 11–2 record and a berth in the state playoffs. He started the season at tight end and moved to offensive tackle early in the season. He also played defensive tackle. He was named all-region and selected All-Low Country by the Palmetto Touchdown Club.

== College career ==
At the University of North Carolina at Chapel Hill, Page was a four-year letterman and three-year starter at defensive tackle for the Tar Heels. He appeared in 40 games including 35 starts and accumulated 123 tackles and 6.5 sacks.

Page was one of seven true freshmen to see game action for the Tar Heels in 2001. He began the season at tight end and played in five games at offensive guard. His most extensive action of the season came against rival Duke.

In the spring prior to the 2002 season, Page was moved from offensive guard to defensive tackle. He started all 12 games and was sixth on the team with 49 tackles, including 24 solo stops and 25 assists. The first sack of his career came against the Duke Blue Devils.

Page started all 12 games in 2003, playing defensive tackle for the first nine games and switching to defensive end for the final three. He finished seventh on the team with 47 tackles, including 30 primary stops and 17 assists. He had five tackles for losses of 19 yards and 1.5 sacks for nine yards. Page earned the coaches' praise for his effort in games against Virginia and East Carolina.

Page received a medical redshirt in 2004 after tearing a tendon in his left hand in preseason practice. He had surgery to repair the tendon was able to recover for the following season.

As a senior in 2005, Page ranked second on the squad with a career-high four sacks.

== Professional career ==
Page was selected by the San Diego Chargers in the seventh-round (225th overall) of the 2006 NFL draft. Sprained ligaments in his knee suffered in early August forced him to miss most of the preseason and he was released by the team on September 2. He was signed to the team's practice squad the following day.

On December 21, the Miami Dolphins signed Page to their active roster from the Chargers' practice squad. He filled a roster spot vacated by veteran defensive tackle Dan Wilkinson, who was placed on Injured Reserve. Page was inactive for the final two games of the season.

Following very limited playing time in the 2007 season, the Dolphins did not offer Page a contract for the 2008 season.
