= Stephen Parker (American football) =

American football player (born 1984)

Profile
- Position: Guard

Personal information
- Born: August 2, 1984 (age 42); El Dorado, Arkansas, U.S.

Career information
- College: University of Arkansas

Awards and highlights
- Second-team All-SEC (2006)
- Stats at Pro Football Reference

Stephen Parker (born August 2, 1984) was an American football offensive guard who was a free agent in the National Football League (NFL). He was originally signed by the Miami Dolphins as an undrafted free agent in 2007. He played collegiately at Arkansas, where he garnered "All American" honors in 2006 from The Sporting News. He played high school football at St. Paul's Catholic High School in Covington, Louisiana.

Stephen served as an offensive graduate assistant at Oklahoma State from 2010 to 2011. He worked as the offensive coordinator at New Mexico Highlands University in 2012 and 2014. In March 2014, he became the offensive coordinator of the Munich Cowboys in the German Football League. With his offense, the team made the playoffs, where they lost 28–69 in the quarterfinal to the later champion New Yorker Lions. However, those 28 points were 17 above average of what the Lions' defense had allowed against other teams that year. In November 2014, he left Germany's south for the north and took over the head coach position of the Kiel Baltic Hurricanes. In October 2015, he also left the Kiel Baltic Hurricanes after a playoff loss against the Allgäu Comets.
