= Johnathan Ingram =

American football player (born 1980)

No. 66, 60
- Position: Offensive lineman

Personal information
- Born: September 20, 1980 (age 46); Indio, California, U.S.
- Listed height: 6 ft 2 in (1.88 m)
- Listed weight: 290 lb (132 kg)

Career information
- College: San Diego State
- NFL draft: 2003: undrafted

Career history
- Kansas City Chiefs (2003–2006); → Frankfurt Galaxy (2004); Miami Dolphins (2007)*; Arizona Rattlers (2008)
- * Offseason or practice squad member only

Awards and highlights
- Second-team All-MW (2002)
- Stats at Pro Football Reference

Johnathan Jerome Ingram (born September 20, 1980) is an American former professional football player who was an offensive lineman in the National Football League (NFL) and Indoor Football League (IFL). He was originally signed by the Kansas City Chiefs as an undrafted free agent in 2003. He played college football at San Diego State.

== Early life ==
Ingram attended high school at La Quinta High School in La Quinta, California.

== College career ==
Ingram started 32 of the 36 games in which he appeared with the San Diego State Aztecs. He was redshirted in 1998 and practiced at tight end.

He played in four games for 127 snaps as a redshirt freshman the following season. As a sophomore, he started eight games at offensive guard and missed three others with a knee sprain. As a junior in 2001, Ingram started 11 games at center and earned honorable mention All-Mountain West Conference honors, while also being named the team's most improved player. He started all 13 games at center as a senior.

== Professional career ==
=== 2003 ===
Ingram went undrafted in the 2003 NFL draft and subsequently signed a two-year contract with the Kansas City Chiefs on May 20. He was released by the team on August 25 and spent the rest of the year out of football.

=== 2004 ===
On January 27, 2004 Ingram was re-signed by the Chiefs and allocated to NFL Europa. The following spring he started all 10 games on the offensive line, helping the Frankfurt Galaxy to 1,066 rushing yards as a team. He also started in the World Bowl versus the Berlin Thunder on June 12.

Ingram then attended training camp with the Chiefs for the second straight year, but was let go during final cutdowns on September 3. He was added to the team's practice squad four days later, where he remained until being elevated to the active roster on November 25 after signing a three-year contract. He spent the remaining six regular season games inactive.

=== 2005 ===
Ingram made the Chiefs' team out of training camp in 2005 and played in his first regular season contest against the New York Jets on September 11. He also played on the placement protection unit in the following three games. Ingram was released on October 4 and signed to the practice squad two days later, where he spent the remainder of the season.

=== 2006 ===
Ingram attended his fourth consecutive training camp with the Chiefs in 2006. He was released by the team on September 2 and was signed to the practice squad two days later.

=== 2007 ===
After his contract expired following the conclusion of the 2006 season, Ingram became a free agent. He attended a Miami Dolphins minicamp from April 13–15 on a tryout basis. He was then signed by the team on April 16 and was assigned No. 68, which had most recently been worn by Seth McKinney - now with the Cleveland Browns - for the previous five seasons. He initially survived the team's final cuts on September 1, but was released a day later when center/guard Gene Mruczkowski was claimed off waivers from the New England Patriots.
