= Shirdonya Mitchell =

American football player (born 1982)

No. 27
- Position: Cornerback

Personal information
- Born: May 16, 1982 (age 44); Dallas, Texas, U.S.
- Listed height: 5 ft 11 in (1.80 m)
- Listed weight: 193 lb (88 kg)

Career information
- College: Missouri
- NFL draft: 2005: undrafted

Career history
- Miami Dolphins (2005–2006); Frankfurt Galaxy (2007); Detroit Lions (2007)*; Tennessee Titans (2008)*
- * Offseason or practice squad member only

Awards and highlights
- All-NFL Europa (2007)

Career NFL statistics
- Tackles: 1
- Stats at Pro Football Reference

Shirdonya Chablis Mitchell (born May 16, 1982) is an American former professional football player who was a cornerback in the National Football League (NFL). He was signed by the Miami Dolphins as an undrafted free agent in 2005. He played college football for the Missouri Tigers.

Mitchell was also a member of the Frankfurt Galaxy, Detroit Lions, and Tennessee Titans.

== Early life ==
Mitchell attended Sam Houston High School in Arlington, Texas, where he was a first-team 5A All-State selection as a wide receiver. He also lettered in basketball and track.

== College career ==
After being redshirted in 2000, Mitchell was a four-year letterman at Missouri from 2001 to 2004. He played wide receiver his first two years with the Tigers before being moved to cornerback for his junior season of 2003. He totaled eight receptions for 53 yards over his first two seasons. In his two years as a cornerback, he registered 57 tackles, five interceptions, 10 pass breakups and a forced fumble. As a senior, he notched 39 tackles and a team-high four interceptions.

Mitchell also served as a return man throughout his career. He averaged 22.9 on 49 kickoffs returns, including a 24.1-yard norm as both a sophomore and junior. He also fielded three punts for a 7.7-yard average in his career. He played in the Gridiron Classic All-Star Game following his senior season.

== Professional career ==
=== Miami Dolphins ===
Upon the conclusion of his collegiate career, Mitchell was not invited to the NFL Combine. On March 10, 2005 Mitchell reportedly pulled up with a sprained knee during his Pro Day. Further tests revealed he suffered a torn anterior cruciate ligament. He had previously run the 40-yard dash in 4.29 and 4.34 times.

Due to the injury and the long rehabilitation process that follows, Mitchell was not selected in the 2005 NFL draft. He was signed by the Miami Dolphins as an undrafted free agent on April 26. He spent the entire season on the Reserve/Non-Football Injury List recovering from his injury.

Mitchell was able to participate in training camp in 2006, but was waived prior to the regular season on September 2. He spent the team's first 15 games of the regular season on the practice squad. On December 27, Mitchell was promoted to the active roster when cornerbacks Andre' Goodman and Eddie Jackson were placed on Injured Reserve. He appeared in the season finale against the Indianapolis Colts, registering one tackle.

On February 24, 2007 Mitchell was assigned to the Frankfurt Galaxy of NFL Europa. In nine starts for the Galaxy, Mitchell recorded 31 tackles, two interceptions (including one returned 81 yards for a touchdown) and nine passes defensed. He was selected to the All-NFL Europa team. However, he was released by the team during the preseason.

=== Detroit Lions ===
Mitchell remained unsigned for the majority of the 2007 season, until he was signed to the practice squad of the Detroit Lions on December 19. He was released just two days later.

=== Tennessee Titans ===
On January 5, 2008, Mitchell was signed to a future contract by the Tennessee Titans. He was waived by the team on July 18.
