= Chris Harrell =

American football player (born 1983)

No. 41
- Position: Safety

Personal information
- Born: January 29, 1983 (age 43); Euclid, Ohio, U.S.
- Listed height: 6 ft 0 in (1.83 m)
- Listed weight: 209 lb (95 kg)

Career information
- College: Penn State
- NFL draft: 2006: undrafted

Career history
- Arizona Cardinals (2006)*; Miami Dolphins (2007)*
- * Offseason or practice squad member only

Christopher Mychal Harrell (born January 29, 1983) is an American former football player. He spent a brief time with the Berlin Thunder of NFL Europa, Harrell was signed to the practice squad with the Arizona Cardinals. He ran a 4.7 and he played collegiately at Penn State University and attended Euclid High School in Euclid, Ohio.

During the 2005 season, the 6'1", 210-pound Harrell was an honorable mention All-Big Ten selection at Penn State. After sitting out 2004 with an injury, He helped the Nittany Lions defense in 2005, and made 88 tackles. There he earned a Bachelor of Arts in Economics in 2005.

Pre-draft measurables
Height	Weight	Arm length	Hand span	40-yard dash	10-yard split	20-yard split	20-yard shuttle	Three-cone drill	Vertical jump	Broad jump	Bench press
6 ft 0 3/8 in (1.84 m)	209 lb (95 kg)	31 in (0.79 m)	9 1/4 in (0.23 m)	4.75 s	1.62 s	2.74 s	4.12 s	7.02 s	40.5 in (1.03 m)	9 ft 11 in (3.02 m)	15 reps
All values from NFL Combine
