= David Sutton (American football) =

American football player (born 1984)

Profile
- Position: Wide receiver

Personal information
- Born: May 30, 1984 (age 42); Westminster, California
- Listed height: 6 ft 6 in (1.98 m)
- Listed weight: 225 lb (102 kg)

Career information
- High school: Long Beach (CA) Polytechnic
- College: Texas-El Paso
- NFL draft: 2007: undrafted

Career history
- Miami Dolphins (2007)*; San Jose SaberCats (2008); Utah Blaze (2008–2009)*; Dallas Vigilantes (2010)*
- * Offseason or practice squad member only

David Deion Sutton (born May 30, 1984) is a former Arena football wide receiver. He was signed by the Miami Dolphins as an undrafted free agent in 2007. He played College football at Texas-El Paso.

== Early life ==
Sutton grew up in Compton, California, and went to high school in Long Beach.

He played football his senior year at Long Beach Polytechnic High School, though he did not get much playing time. However, he was a two-year letterman in track and field, competing in the high jump and long jump. He also competed in volleyball in high school, earning team MVP his junior year and most-improved player his sophomore season.

== College career ==
Sutton first attended Lincoln (Mo.) University beginning in 2003. As a freshman, he set a freshman record with an 89-yard reception, and ended the 2003 season with 16 receptions for 445 yards and six touchdowns. He then transferred to Compton Community College for one year. In 2004, he recorded 15 receptions for 400 yards with two touchdowns. He then transferred to UTEP in 2005, where he played in eight of 12 games his first season. He recorded two receptions for 12 yards, including a touchdown against Texas Southern. His first career reception was a two-yard touchdown pass from Jordan Palmer. As a senior in 2006, Sutton played in 12 games with two starts. He recorded four receptions for 18 yards.

== Professional career ==
=== Miami Dolphins ===
Sutton went unselected in the 2007 NFL draft, he was signed by the Miami Dolphins as a free agent on May 4, 2007. He was released by the team on August 27.

=== Utah Blaze ===
Sutton was signed to the practice squad of the Arena Football League's Utah Blaze on March 4, 2009

== Personal ==
Sutton is a cousin of former UCLA and NBA player Tyus Edney.
