= Abraham Wright =

American gridiron football player (born 1984)

No. 53
- Position: Defensive end

Personal information
- Born: October 15, 1984 (age 42); Tulsa, Oklahoma, U.S.
- Listed height: 6 ft 3 in (1.91 m)
- Listed weight: 245 lb (111 kg)

Career information
- High school: Southeast (Oklahoma City, Oklahoma)
- College: Colorado
- NFL draft: 2007: 7th round, 238th overall pick

Career history
- Miami Dolphins (2007); BC Lions (2009)*
- * Offseason or practice squad member only

Awards and highlights
- First-team All-Big 12 (2006)

Abraham Winston Wright (born October 15, 1984) is an American former professional football defensive end. He was selected by the Miami Dolphins in the seventh round of the 2007 NFL draft. He played college football at Colorado.

== Early life ==
Wright was a three-year letterman and starter at defensive end and linebacker for Southeast High School in Oklahoma City, Oklahoma. As a senior, he earned first-team All-District honors with 110 tackles, including 14 for losses and 7.5 quarterback sacks. In a game against Guymon High School as a senior, he had eight tackles, a sack, and an interception which preserved the close win.

== College career ==
=== Northeast Oklahoma A&M ===
Prior to attending Colorado, Wright played one season at Northeastern Oklahoma A&M College in Miami, Oklahoma. He redshirted in 2002 while he made the transition from linebacker to defensive end. In 2003, Wright had 68 tackles (38 solo), with 14 tackles for loss including eight quarterback sacks and a pass defensed. He helped NEO to a 10-2 record, the Southwest Junior College Football Conference championship and a No. 11 national ranking. In a 34-20 win over Blinn College he recorded six tackles and three sacks.

Wright was named to SuperPrep’s JUCO Top 100 List, ranked as the No. 62 JUCO player overall, and the No. 5 defensive end. Rivals.com named him as the 59th best non-high school prospect.

=== University of Colorado ===
After transferring the University of Colorado in 2004, Wright appeared in all 13 games as a sophomore and started the final three regular season contests. On the year, he recorded 23 tackles (17 solo), tying for second on the team in quarterback sacks with 4.5 and had six tackle for a loss. He also had six pressures, which was good for second best on the team. His first career sack came against Washington State, and his first multi-sack game came against Kansas. He set a season-high with five tackles against Kansas State.

In 2005, Wright started all 13 games including the 2005 Champs Sports Bowl at defensive end. On the year, he accumulated 27 tackles (19 solo), five sacks, two forced fumbles and an interception. He earned CU athlete of the week and lineman of the week honors for a game against Oklahoma State, in which he totaled four solo tackles, a sack, an interception, a caused interception, a forced fumbled and a third-down stop. He reached a season high four tackles on three occasions, and had three tackles in the team's bowl game against Clemson.

Entering his senior season, Wright was on the preseason watch list for the Ted Hendricks Award, given to the nation's top defensive end, and was also on the official preseason All-America watch list by the Football Writer’s Association of America. He played in all 12 games in 2006, taking part in the second most defensive snaps of any player on the team and the most for all non-defensive backs. On the year, he had a career high 57 tackles (39 solo) along with 11.5 sacks, 17 quarterback pressures, a forced fumbled and three pass break-ups. His sack total lead the team and was nine sacks higher than anyone else on the squad in 2006. Wright's season highlights included a six-tackle performance in the opener against Montana State, two sacks against Baylor and a personal best three sacks against rival Colorado State.

== Professional career ==
=== Miami Dolphins ===
Wright was selected by the Miami Dolphins in the seventh round, with the 238th overall pick, of the 2007 NFL draft. The pick used to select Wright had been acquired earlier in the offseason in the trade that sent wide receiver Wes Welker to the New England Patriots.

On November 7, 2007, he was placed on season-ending injured reserve with a knee injury. He was waived by the Dolphins on May 5, 2008.

=== BC Lions ===
Wright signed a practice roster agreement with the BC Lions on October 14, 2009. He was invited to the Lions' 2010 training camp in Kamloops. He was released by the Lions on June 5, 2010.

== Personal life ==
Wright began learning sign language in the summer of 2004, and has a genuine interest in working with the deaf once his playing days are over. In 2017, Abe Wright became the Community Evangelist for Emmanuel Enid, Oklahoma. Abe, along with Wade Burleson (Lead Pastor, Emmanuel Enid, Oklahoma), offer a weekly podcast called The WAbe, which can be heard on all podcast streaming services. In 2018, he accepted a Teaching Pastoral position at Council Road Baptist Church in Oklahoma City, Oklahoma.

Abraham is married with 4 children. Named Trinity, Bailey, Isaac, and Jacob Now he got his PHD at Liberty University.
