= Edmond Miles =

American football player (born 1984)

No. 50, 52
- Position: Linebacker

Personal information
- Born: July 6, 1984 (age 42); Tallahassee, Florida, U.S.
- Listed height: 5 ft 11 in (1.80 m)
- Listed weight: 227 lb (103 kg)

Career information
- College: Iowa
- NFL draft: 2007: undrafted

Career history
- Miami Dolphins (2007); New York Giants (2008); Atlanta Falcons (2009)*
- * Offseason or practice squad member only

Awards and highlights
- Sporting News Freshman All-Big Ten (2003)

Career NFL statistics
- Total tackles: 18
- Forced fumbles: 1
- Stats at Pro Football Reference

Edmond Miles (born July 6, 1984) is an American former professional football player who was a linebacker in the National Football League (NFL). He played college football for the Iowa Hawkeyes and was signed by the Miami Dolphins as an undrafted free agent in 2007.

Miles played 18 games with the Dolphins and the New York Giants before signing as a free agent with the Atlanta Falcons in 2009. He was released from the Falcons on August 25, 2009.

After his NFL career he currently coaches the Cedar Rapids Jefferson J-Hawks football team.
