= Aaron Halterman =

American football player (born 1982)

No. 80
- Position: Tight end

Personal information
- Born: March 31, 1982 (age 44); Indianapolis, Indiana, U.S.
- Listed height: 6 ft 5 in (1.96 m)
- Listed weight: 265 lb (120 kg)

Career information
- High school: Center Grove (Greenwood, Indiana)
- College: Indiana
- NFL draft: 2004: undrafted

Career history
- Houston Texans (2005–2006)*; → Rhein Fire (2006); Miami Dolphins (2006)*; San Diego Chargers (2006)*; Indianapolis Colts (2006)*; Miami Dolphins (2007–2008)
- * Offseason or practice squad member only

Awards and highlights
- Super Bowl champion (XLI)

Career NFL statistics
- Receptions: 1
- Receiving yards: 7
- Stats at Pro Football Reference

Aaron Halterman (born March 31, 1982) is an American former professional football player who was a tight end in the National Football League (NFL). He was signed by the Houston Texans as an undrafted free agent in 2005. He played college football for the Indiana Hoosiers.

Halterman was also a member of the San Diego Chargers, Indianapolis Colts and Miami Dolphins. He earned a Super Bowl ring as a member of the Colts' practice squad in Super Bowl XLI.

== Early life ==
Halterman attended Center Grove High School in Greenwood, Indiana, and was a letterman in football and track.

== College career ==
He started 35 of the 44 games in which he appeared during his four-year collegiate career at Indiana University from 2001 to 2004 under former Dolphins head coach Cam Cameron. During that time, he totaled 66 receptions for 711 yards and three touchdowns. At Indiana, he majored in psychology.

== Professional career ==
=== Houston Texans ===
Halterman originally went to camp with Houston as an undrafted college free agent in 2005, and spent his entire rookie season on the Texans’ practice squad. He also played with the Rhein Fire of NFL Europa in the spring of 2006, before being waived by the Texans on September 1, 2006.

=== Indianapolis Colts ===
After brief stints on the practice squads of the Miami Dolphins and San Diego Chargers in 2006, Halterman finished the season as a member of the Indianapolis Colts practice squad, where he spent the final two regular season games and all four playoff contests.

=== Miami Dolphins (second stint) ===
After his contract expired, Halterman signed with the Miami Dolphins on February 14, 2007, reuniting him with the Dolphins' head coach Cam Cameron, who mentored him both at Indiana and during his brief tenure with the Chargers.

In August 2008, Halterman was waived/injured with a back injury and subsequently placed on season-ending injured reserve. An exclusive-rights free agent in the 2009 offseason, Halterman was non-tendered and became an unrestricted free agent.

== Personal life ==
After back injuries prematurely ended Halterman's playing career, he began to pursue a master's degree in counseling and educational psychology with a minor in sports from Indiana University-Bloomington. Halterman took a job as an intern in the guidance office at Center Grove High School for the 2011–2012 school year as part of his master's program. Halterman graduated with a PhD in counseling psychology from Indiana University-Bloomington in 2019.
