= Joe Toledo =

American football player (born 1982)

No. 67
- Position: Offensive tackle

Personal information
- Born: October 20, 1982 (age 44); Omaha, Nebraska, U.S.
- Listed height: 6 ft 5 in (1.96 m)
- Listed weight: 300 lb (136 kg)

Career information
- High school: La Costa Canyon (Carlsbad, California)
- College: Washington
- NFL draft: 2006: 4th round, 114th overall pick

Career history
- Miami Dolphins (2006–2007); Green Bay Packers (2008); San Francisco 49ers (2008–2009); San Diego Chargers (2009); Seattle Seahawks (2010); Philadelphia Eagles (2011)

Awards and highlights
- UW Most Outstanding Freshman Award (2002)
- Stats at Pro Football Reference

Joseph Christopher Toledo (born October 20, 1982) is an American former professional football offensive tackle. He was selected by the Miami Dolphins in the fourth round of the 2006 NFL draft. He played college football at Washington.

Toledo was also a member of the Green Bay Packers, San Francisco 49ers, San Diego Chargers, Seattle Seahawks, and Philadelphia Eagles.

== Early life ==
Toledo lived in Carlsbad, California while attending La Costa Canyon High School his Junior and Senior year of High School. Prior to that, he attended Ralston High School in Ralston, Nebraska where he lettered in football, basketball and baseball. During his senior season, he made 34 receptions for 931 yards and 11 touchdowns. He also played well as a defensive end, recording 51 tackles, five sacks, and three forced fumbles. He finished his career with 75 receptions for 1,792 yards and 19 touchdowns. He also lettered in baseball and basketball.

== College career ==
Toledo was a four-year letterman at the University of Washington from 2002 to 2005, playing in 32 games with 23 starts. He was redshirted in 2001, and played tight end before moving to the offensive line prior to the 2005 season. Toledo collected 291 yards with a pair of touchdowns on 27 receptions (10.8 avg) in 26 games as a tight end.

After being redshirted in 2001, Toledo started five of the 13 games in which he appeared at tight end in 2002. He made three catches for 19 yards on the season, including a two-catch, 16-yard performance against Southern California.

Toledo started just three games in 2003, bothered most of the season with a bulging disc. On the year, he caught five passes for 70 yards, including three catches for 26 yards against Ohio State in the season opener. He had a career long 35-yard reception against Indiana.

Toledo appeared in 10 games in 2004, starting nine times. He did not play in season opener against Fresno State with a groin injury. Toledo tied for second on the team with 19 receptions for 202 yards (10.6 avg.). He also had a pair of touchdown catches, with his first career score coming on a 24-yard toss from Isaiah Stanback against Oregon State. He was the team's leading receiver against Arizona with six catches for 62 yards.

Toledo shifted to offensive tackle during his senior season in 2005. He started six games as a senior - three each at right and left tackle. He suffered a high ankle sprain in the season opener against Air Force that sidelined him for next five games. On the year, he graded 83.6 percent for blocking consistency and produced 37 key blocks/knockdowns with six resulting in touchdowns. He also allowed only one quarterback sack on an offense that averaged 358.0 yards per game. Following the season, he participated in the East-West Shrine Game.

== Professional career ==
=== Pre-draft ===
Pre-draft measurables
Height	Weight	Arm length	Hand span	40-yard dash	10-yard split	20-yard split	20-yard shuttle	Three-cone drill	Vertical jump	Broad jump	Bench press
6 ft 5 1/2 in (1.97 m)	337 lb (153 kg)	32 3/4 in (0.83 m)	10 1/8 in (0.26 m)	5.19 s	1.83 s	3.02 s	4.65 s	7.90 s	29.0 in (0.74 m)	8 ft 3 in (2.51 m)	32 reps
All values from NFL Combine/Washington's Pro Day

At Washington's Pro Day in 2006, Toledo measured a height of 6-5 3/8 and a weight of 332 pounds. He finished the short shuttle in 4.66 seconds and the three-cone drill in 7.92 seconds.

=== Miami Dolphins ===
Toledo was selected in the fourth round (114th overall) in the 2006 NFL draft by the Miami Dolphins and former head coach Nick Saban. On July 19, he signed a four-year deal containing base salaries of $275,000 for 2006, $360,000 for 2007, $445,000 for 2008 and $530,000 for 2009. The contract also included incentive clauses that could have pushed the worth of the deal to nearly $3 million. It included an estimated signing bonus of $430,000.

After working at offensive guard during the team's May 2006 mini-camp, Toledo practiced at both guard and tackle during training camp. When projected starting right guard Seth McKinney was injured, Toledo was given a chance to win the job. Reports indicated he was leading the race over recently signed Bennie Anderson, but a knee injury on August 15 slowed his development. Toledo only played in one game during the preseason, and was placed on Injured Reserve on September 3, ending his rookie season.

Due to lingering injuries, Toledo was placed on the Physically Unable to Perform list on July 23. On February 11, 2008, Toledo was one of nine players released by the Dolphins.

=== Green Bay Packers ===
On February 28, 2008, Toledo was signed by the Green Bay Packers.

=== San Francisco 49ers ===
On June 10, 2008, Toledo was signed by the San Francisco 49ers.

After spending the entire 2008 season on the practice squad, Toledo was re-signed to a future contract on December 29. He was waived on September 3, 2009.

=== San Diego Chargers ===
Toledo was signed by the San Diego Chargers on October 27, 2009.

=== Seattle Seahawks ===
On May 2, 2010, Toledo signed a contract with the Seattle Seahawks.

=== Omaha Nighthawks ===
Toledo was drafted by the Omaha Nighthawks in the third round (12th overall) of the 2011 UFL draft on May 2, 2011.

=== Philadelphia Eagles ===
Toledo signed with the Philadelphia Eagles on August 13, 2011. He was waived on August 15.

== Personal life ==
Toledo holds a B.A. from the University of Washington, and majored in law, society, and justice.
