= Brian Soi =

American football player (born 1985)

No. 75, 62
- Position: Defensive tackle

Personal information
- Born: May 3, 1985 (age 41); Honolulu, Hawaii, U.S.
- Listed height: 6 ft 3 in (1.91 m)
- Listed weight: 334 lb (151 kg)

Career information
- High school: Provo (UT) Timpview
- College: Utah State
- NFL draft: 2007: undrafted

Career history
- Miami Dolphins (2007)*; New York Giants (2008)*; Green Bay Packers (2009); Utah Blaze (2010)
- * Offseason or practice squad member only

Brian Soi (born May 3, 1985) is an American former football defensive tackle. He was signed by the Miami Dolphins as an undrafted free agent in 2007. He played college football at Utah State.

Soi was also a member of the New York Giants, Green Bay Packers, and Utah Blaze.

== Professional career ==
=== Green Bay Packers ===
Soi was signed by the Green Bay Packers on April 13, 2009. He was later released. It was announced the Soi would be a member of the Utah Blaze for the 2010 season.
