= Julius Wilson =

American football player (born 1983)

No. 55, 78, 72
- Position: Offensive tackle

Personal information
- Born: October 17, 1983 (age 43); Bradenton, Florida, U.S.
- Listed height: 6 ft 4 in (1.93 m)
- Listed weight: 315 lb (143 kg)

Career information
- College: UAB
- NFL draft: 2007: undrafted

Career history
- Miami Dolphins (2007); St. Louis Rams (2008)*; Tampa Bay Buccaneers (2008–2009)*; Florida Tuskers (2009); Orlando Predators (2010); Omaha Nighthawks (2010); Tampa Bay Storm (2012); Orlando Predators (2013–2014); Los Angeles KISS (2014–2015)
- * Offseason or practice squad member only

Awards and highlights
- Second-team All-Conference USA (2006); Third-team All-Conference USA (2005)

Career AFL statistics
- Receptions: 11
- Receiving yards: 147
- Receiving touchdowns: 2
- Total tackles: 4
- Fumble recoveries: 1
- Stats at ArenaFan.com

Julius Wilson (born October 17, 1983) is an American former professional football offensive tackle. He was signed by the Miami Dolphins as an undrafted free agent in 2007. He played college football at UAB.

Wilson was also a member of the St. Louis Rams, Tampa Bay Buccaneers, Florida Tuskers, Orlando Predators, Omaha Nighthawks, Tampa Bay Storm, and Los Angeles KISS.

On December 14, 2010, Wilson worked out for the Baltimore Ravens, but was not signed.
