= Mark Washington (linebacker) =

American football player and coach (born 1985)

No. 51
- Position: Linebacker

Personal information
- Born: August 20, 1985 (age 41); Harbor City, California, U.S.
- Listed height: 6 ft 3 in (1.91 m)
- Listed weight: 250 lb (113 kg)

Career information
- High school: Long Beach Polytechnic (Long Beach, California)
- College: Texas State
- NFL draft: 2007: undrafted

Career history

Playing
- San Francisco 49ers (2007)*; Miami Dolphins (2007); San Francisco 49ers (2009)*; Arizona Cardinals (2009–2010)*; Minnesota Vikings (2011)*
- * Offseason or practice squad member only

Coaching
- Humboldt State (OLB) (2015)

Career NFL statistics
- Total tackles: 1
- Stats at Pro Football Reference

Mark Terrell Washington II (born August 20, 1985) is an American former professional football player who was a linebacker in the National Football League (NFL). He played college football for the Texas State Bobcats.

== Early life and college career ==
Washington was born in Harbor City, California. His father, also named Mark Washington, was a defensive end at the University of Colorado Boulder. Growing up in Long Beach, Washington graduated from Long Beach Polytechnic High School in 2003. As a senior, Washington was a first-team all-state honor on defense in 2002. He helped Long Beach Poly win the CIF Southern Section Division I title in 2001.

USA Today ranked Washington the no. 3 linebacker in the nation, and Scout.com rated Washington three stars out of five. In 2003, Washington began his college football career at Arizona State under head coach Dirk Koetter. Playing in eight games, Washington had seven tackles and a sack. After his freshman season, Washington left the football team to focus on academics.

In the spring of 2006, Washington transferred to Texas State, then a Division I-AA program coached by David Bailiff. Starting nine games at defensive tackles out of 11 games played in 2006, Washington had 29 tackles, including 7.5 tackles for loss and 3.5 sacks, and one sack.

== Professional career ==
On July 4, 2007, Washington was declared eligible for the 2007 NFL Supplemental draft. The San Francisco 49ers signed Washington as an undrafted free agent on July 18, 2007. Following the preseason, Washington was waived on September 1 but signed with the 49ers practice squad three days later.

On December 5, 2007, Washington signed with Miami Dolphins to the active roster. He played in the Dolphins' final three games of the season and had one tackle. The Dolphins released Washington on April 24, 2008.

Washington signed again with the 49ers on March 16, 2009, and was cut after the preseason on September 5. On December 11, 2009, Washington signed with the Arizona Cardinals and was placed on the practice squad. He then signed a futures contract with the Cardinals on January 18, 2010. Following an injury, Washington was waived on September 3. On July 31, 2011, Washington signed with the Minnesota Vikings. He was released nearly a month later on August 26.

== Coaching career ==
In 2015, Washington was outside linebackers coach at Humboldt State. The 2015 Humboldt State team went 10–2 with a second round appearance in the NCAA Division II playoffs.
