= Drew Mormino =

American football player (born 1983)

No. 77
- Position: Center

Personal information
- Born: November 20, 1983 (age 42); Palmer, Alaska, U.S.
- Listed height: 6 ft 4 in (1.93 m)
- Listed weight: 301 lb (137 kg)

Career information
- College: Central Michigan
- NFL draft: 2007: 6th round, 199th overall pick

Career history
- Miami Dolphins (2007); San Diego Chargers (2009)*
- * Offseason or practice squad member only

Awards and highlights
- Second-team All-MAC (2006)

Drennan Charles Mormino (born November 20, 1983) is an American former professional football center who played college football at Central Michigan. He was selected 199th overall by the Miami Dolphins in the sixth round in the 2007 NFL draft. In May 2008, he was waived by the Dolphins after having spent the season on the injury list.
