= Chad Walker =

American football coach

Personal information
- Born: New Orleans, Louisiana, U.S.

Career information
- College: LSU

Career history
- LSU (2000) Student assistant; West Virginia (2001) Graduate assistant; Louisiana–Monroe (2002) Graduate assistant; LSU (2003–2004) Defensive graduate assistant; Miami Dolphins (2005–2007) Defensive quality control coach; Bryant (2008–2009) Defensive backs coach; Bryant (2010) Co-defensive coordinator & defensive backs coach; Mississippi College (2011–2012) Defensive coordinator & defensive backs coach; Oklahoma (2013–2014) Defensive quality control coach; Atlanta Falcons (2015–2016) Defensive assistant; Arkansas (2017) Outside linebackers coach; Atlanta Falcons (2018–2019) Offensive assistant; Atlanta Falcons (2020) Safeties coach

Awards and highlights
- BCS national champion (2003)

Chad Walker is an American football coach who last was the safeties coach for the Atlanta Falcons. Chad spent his first two seasons in Atlanta as the assistant defensive backs coach. He was formerly a quality control assistant at the University of Oklahoma before he joined the Falcons as a defensive assistant.

Walker was hired in 2013 by Oklahoma University to help transform the defense to a 3-4 scheme. Prior to joining the Sooners staff, Walker spent two seasons as the defensive coordinator at Division III Mississippi College. He spent three years at Bryant University, first as defensive backs coach in 2009 before being promoted to defensive coordinator in 2010. Walker helped the Bulldogs post a 19–14 record over their first three years as an FCS program.

The New Orleans, Louisiana, native worked as a defensive quality control coach for three seasons with the Miami Dolphins (2005–2007). Before moving to the NFL, Walker spent two seasons as a defensive assistant on Nick Saban's staff at Louisiana State University. During that time the Tigers won the 2003 SEC championship and national title. Walker served as a graduate assistant at Louisiana-Monroe and West Virginia before landing at LSU. He began his coaching career as a student assistant at LSU in 2000 after graduating with a degree in education.

In the 2016 season, Walker and the Atlanta Falcons would reach Super Bowl LI. Against the New England Patriots, the Falcons would fall in a 34–28 overtime defeat.

On February 10, 2017, Walker was hired by the University of Arkansas as the outside linebackers coach. On February 14, 2018, Walker was yet again hired by the Falcons, only this time to serve as an offensive assistant.

On May 19, 2022, Loganville Christian Academy announced that Walker would be their new athletic director.
