= Dan Stevenson =

American football player (born 1982)

Daniel Stevenson
No. 63
- Position: Guard / Center

Personal information
- Born: October 4, 1982 (age 44); Chicago, Illinois, U.S.
- Listed height: 6 ft 5 in (1.96 m)
- Listed weight: 300 lb (136 kg)

Career information
- High school: Barrington (IL)
- College: Notre Dame
- NFL draft: 2006: 6th round, 205th overall pick

Career history
- New England Patriots (2006)*; Miami Dolphins (2006–2007); Houston Texans (2007–2008)
- * Offseason or practice squad member only

Awards and highlights
- All-American (2000)

Daniel Whitney Stevenson (born October 4, 1982) is an American former professional football offensive lineman. He was selected by the New England Patriots in the sixth round of the 2006 NFL draft. He played college football at Notre Dame. Stevenson was also a member of the Miami Dolphins.

== Early life ==
Stevenson attended Barrington High School in Barrington, Illinois. He was a PARADE All-American, rated 95th on the Chicago Sun-Times list of the nation's top 100 prospects and rated the top offensive lineman in the Midwest. He earned three letters in football, helping his team win two league titles as a junior and senior. The team captain, he made 63 pancake blocks as a senior in 2000.

He also won three letters in track and field, qualifying for the state meet in the discus and shot put. He served twice as the track team's captain, earning All-League honors as a senior. He also played volleyball on the junior varsity for two years as a freshman and a sophomore.

== College career ==
Stevenson played in 45 games with 35 starts over four seasons (2002–2005) at Notre Dame and was a three-year starter at offensive guard. He was redshirted in 2001.

After being redshirted in 2001, played in 11 games (including one start) in 2002. He began the year as a reserve guard and moved to tackle and into the starting lineup for the Gator Bowl against N.C. State, in place of Brennan Curtin. Stevenson made his first career appearance for the Fighting Irish against Maryland. He became a regular part of the offensive line rotation and saw increased playing time as the season progressed.

Stevenson started 10 games at right guard as a sophomore in 2003, while also making 12 special teams appearances. He made his only collegiate reception when he grabbed a tipped pass at the line against Michigan State. Stevenson helped running back Julius Jones (now with the Seattle Seahawks) rush for a school-record 262 yards against Pittsburgh. Jones recorded three games with 200-plus yards rushing, becoming the first player in Notre Dame history to achieve the feat.

In 2004, Stevenson started all 12 games at right guard and helped the Fighting Irish average 345.5 yards per game. He collected 56 key blocks/knockdowns with six touchdown-resulting blocks, playing on a line that allowed just 25 sacks. He also made 40 special teams appearances on the season. Stevenson blocked for the Irish to rush for 195 yards against national champion Southern California - the most rushing yards allowed by the Trojans in two years.

As senior, Stevenson was the winner of the Guardian Insurance Guardian of the Year Award, presented annually to Notre Dame's top offensive lineman. He was an All-Independent first-team selection by the NFL Draft Report. Starting all 12 games at right guard, he helped an explosive offense that averaged 36.7 points and 477.3 yards per game (330.2 passing, 147.1 rushing). He helped lead the way as halfback Darius Walker eclipsed 100 rushing yards in seven games. On the year, Stevenson produced 78 key blocks/knockdowns with eight touchdown-resulting blocks, as the offensive line allowed only 21 sacks. He also made 71 special teams appearances. He helped the offense churn out more than 500 yards in five separate games and exceed 600 yards once (621 yards against Purdue).

== Professional career ==
=== Pre-draft ===
Pre-draft measurables
Height	Weight	Arm length	Hand span	40-yard dash	10-yard split	20-yard split	20-yard shuttle	Three-cone drill	Vertical jump	Broad jump	Bench press
6 ft 5 1/8 in (1.96 m)	300 lb (136 kg)	33 1/4 in (0.84 m)	9 7/8 in (0.25 m)	5.34 s	1.86 s	3.09 s	4.54 s	7.32 s	24.5 in (0.62 m)	8 ft 4 in (2.54 m)	24 reps
All values from NFL Combine/Notre Dame's Pro Day

At the Notre Dame pro day, Stevenson measured a height of 6-5 1/4 and a weight of 300 pounds. He ran the 40-yard dash twice with a time of 5.34 seconds. His short shuttle time was 4.55 seconds and his 3 cone drill time was 7.33 seconds.

=== New England Patriots ===
Stevenson was selected by the New England Patriots in the sixth round (205th overall) of the 2006 NFL draft. He was waived by the Patriots on September 2, 2006, following training camp, and proceeded to spend the first eight games of the regular season on the team's practice squad before being released November 7.

=== Miami Dolphins ===
Two days after his release from the Patriots, the Dolphins signed Stevenson to their practice squad. They elevated to the active roster on December 19. He was inactive the final two games of the season. Stevenson was released by the Dolphins during final cuts on September 1, 2007.

=== Houston Texans ===
The Texans signed Stevenson to their practice squad on December 4, 2007. He was signed to a future contract by the Texans on January 15, 2008, was waived/injured on July 22, 2008, cleared waivers, and was placed on injured reserve two days later, ending his season. Stevenson was not re-signed following the season.

== Personal life ==
Dan's father, Mark Stevenson, played at Missouri, in the USFL for the Chicago Blitz (1983) and Arizona Wranglers (1984) before playing with the Detroit Lions as a center/guard in 1985. Dan's brother, Tony, played football at Arizona State while another brother, Joey, played football at Arizona Western.
