= Marvin Marshall =

American football player (born 1972)

No. 89, 1
- Positions: Wide receiver, Return specialist

Personal information
- Born: June 21, 1972 (age 54); Aschaffenburg, West Germany
- Listed height: 5 ft 10 in (1.78 m)
- Listed weight: 162 lb (73 kg)

Career information
- High school: George P. Butler (Augusta, Georgia)
- College: South Carolina State (1990–1994)
- NFL draft: 1995: undrafted

Career history
- Indianapolis Colts (1995)*; Tampa Bay Buccaneers (1995–1998); → Barcelona Dragons (1996); Carolina Cobras (2000)
- * Offseason or practice squad member only

Awards and highlights
- Black college national champion (1994); 2× MEAC Offensive Player of the Year (1993, 1994); 2× First-team All-MEAC (1993, 1994)

Career NFL statistics
- Games played: 5
- Receptions: 2
- Receiving yards: 27
- Return yards: 359
- Stats at Pro Football Reference
- Stats at ArenaFan.com

Marvin Ali Marshall (born June 21, 1972) is an American former professional football player who was a wide receiver and return specialist for the Tampa Bay Buccaneers of the National Football League (NFL). He played college football for the South Carolina State Bulldogs.

== Early life ==
Marshall was born on June 21, 1972, in Aschaffenburg, West Germany but grew up in Augusta, Georgia, U. S. He attended George P. Butler High School in Augusta. As a quarterback, Marshall committed to play college football at South Carolina State University.

== College career ==
Marshall played college football for the South Carolina State Bulldogs from 1990 to 1994 and was a four-year letterman from 1991 to 1994. He was twice named to the first-team All-Mid-Eastern Athletic Conference team and was the conferences' Offensive Player of the Year in 1993 and 1994. As a senior, Marshall passed for 1,715 yards and 18 touchdowns with 1,201 rushing yards and ten scores on the ground. His total offense numbers of 2,916 set a single-season school record.

== Professional career ==
=== Indianapolis Colts ===
After going unselected in the 1995 NFL draft, Marshall signed with the Indianapolis Colts as an undrafted free agent. He transitioned to wide receiver during training camp but he was waived on August 22.

=== Tampa Bay Buccaneers ===
On November 28, 1995, Marshall was signed by the Tampa Bay Buccaneers to the practice squad. On December 20, he was elevated to the active roster. On August 25, 1996, Marshall was waived by the team. On August 27, he was signed to the practice squad. On November 9, Marshall was elevated to the active roster. He played in five games, where he caught two passes for 27 yards and had 359 total return yards. On August 18, 1997, Marshall was placed on season-ending injured reserve with a knee injury. On August 25, 1998, he was released by the team.

=== Barcelona Dragons ===
On February 18, 1996, Marshall was allocated to the Barcelona Dragons of the World League of American Football (WLAF). He had 16 receptions for 243 yards with 243 punt return and 419 kickoff return yards.

=== Carolina Cobras ===
On March 10, 2000, Marshall signed with the Carolina Cobras of the Arena Football League (AFL). He played in five games with eight receptions for 90 yards and a touchdown. On defense, Marshall had 24 tackles, five pass break ups and an interception.
