= Kelvin Smith =

American football player (born 1984)

No. 58, 56
- Position: Linebacker

Personal information
- Born: March 20, 1984 (age 42); Spring Valley, New York, U.S.
- Listed height: 6 ft 2 in (1.88 m)
- Listed weight: 240 lb (109 kg)

Career information
- High school: North Rockland (NY)
- College: Syracuse
- NFL draft: 2007: 7th round, 219th overall pick

Career history
- Miami Dolphins (2007–2008); New York Giants (2009)*; Carolina Panthers (2009); Chicago Bears (2010)*; Dallas Cowboys (2010–2011)*; Carolina Panthers (2011)*
- * Offseason or practice squad member only

Awards and highlights
- Sporting News Big East All-Freshman (2003); Third-team Freshman All-American (2003)

Career NFL statistics
- Games played: 7
- Total tackles: 1
- Stats at Pro Football Reference

Kelvin Vincent Smith (born March 20, 1984) is an American former professional football player who was a linebacker in the National Football League (NFL) for the Miami Dolphins and Carolina Panthers. He was selected by the Dolphins in the seventh round of the 2007 NFL draft. He played college football for the Syracuse Orange.

== Early life ==
Smith attended North Rockland High School in Thiells, New York where he played defensive end, middle linebacker and fullback.

As a senior, he posted 150 tackles, 6 interceptions, 3 fumble recoveries, 700 rushing yards and 7 touchdowns. He received New York Sportswriters Association First-team Class AA All-State Defense, New York Sportswriters Association Section 1 Player of the Year and PrepStar All-American honors.

== College career ==
Smith accepted a football scholarship from Syracuse University. As a freshman, he started 11 out of 12 games after, after linebacker Jameel Dumas suffered a knee injury in the season opener. He made 68 tackles (6 for loss), one sack and one interception.

As a sophomore, he started all 12 games, registering 53 tackles (4 for loss), 2 two interceptions, including one returned for a touchdown. As a junior, he started all 11 games, recording 84 tackles (led the team), 2 sacks, 7 tackles for loss and one interception.

As senior, he started all 12 games, collecting 115 tackles (second in the Big East Conference), 2.5 sacks, 4.5 tackles for loss, one interception, 2 forced fumbles and 2 fumble recoveries.

He finished his college career after starting 46 straight games, including 2 seasons at outside linebacker and 2 at middle linebacker. He made 320 tackles, 21.5 tackles for loss (11th in school history), 4.5 sacks and 5 interceptions.

== Professional career ==
Smith was selected by the Miami Dolphins in the seventh round (219th overall) of the 2007 NFL draft. He was waived on September 7 and later signed to the practice squad. He was promoted to the active roster on December 4, 2007. In 2008, he suffered a serious knee injury in the first preseason game against the Tampa Bay Buccaneers. He was waived/injured on August 11 and reverted to injured reserve the next day. In January 2009, he was re-signed. He was released on February 10, 2009.

On May 10, 2009, he was signed by the New York Giants. He was released on July 30, 2009.

On August 9, 2009, he was signed by the Carolina Panthers. On November 10, he was promoted to the active roster after linebacker Thomas Davis was lost for the season with a knee injury. He was waived injured on December 1, 2009.

On August 11, 2010, he was signed by the Chicago Bears. He was released on September 3, 2010.

In 2010, he was signed to the Dallas Cowboys practice squad. On January 3, 2011, he was re-signed. He was released on July 28, 2011.

On July 31, 2011, he was claimed off waivers by the Panthers. He was waived/injured on August 7 and reverted to injured reserve the next day. Smith was waived by the Panthers on August 16, 2011.

== Personal life ==
Smith is the nephew of former NFL linebacker and fellow Syracuse alum Keith Bulluck.
