= Ryan Flinn (American football) =

American football player (born 1980)

No. 6
- Position: Punter

Personal information
- Born: February 14, 1980 (age 46); Ft. Myers, Florida, U.S.
- Listed height: 6 ft 5 in (1.96 m)
- Listed weight: 210 lb (95 kg)

Career information
- College: UCF
- NFL draft: 2003: undrafted

Career history
- Dallas Cowboys (2004)*; Atlanta Falcons (2005)*; Green Bay Packers (2005); Miami Dolphins (2007)*; Team Michigan (2008)*
- * Offseason or practice squad member only

Awards and highlights
- All-Mid-American Conference (2002)

Career NFL statistics
- Games played: 2
- Stats at Pro Football Reference

Ryan Patric Flinn (born February 14, 1980) is an American former professional football player who was a punter in the National Football League (NFL). He played college football for the UCF Knights.

== College career ==
Flinn attended the University of Central Florida. As a senior he won All-Mid-American Conference honors after averaging 41.8 yards per punt.

== Professional career ==
Flinn made his NFL debut with the Green Bay Packers on December 25, 2005, in a game against the Chicago Bears. He had previously spent time in training camp with the Dallas Cowboys and Atlanta Falcons but was cut in August both times.

On February 19, 2007, Flinn was signed by the Miami Dolphins. He was released by the team on August 27, losing out to rookie punter Brandon Fields.
