= 2008 Chicago Bears season =

NFL team season

- Owner: The McCaskey Family
- General manager: Jerry Angelo
- Head coach: Lovie Smith
- Offensive coordinator: Ron Turner
- Defensive coordinator: Bob Babich
- Home stadium: Soldier Field

Results
- Record: 9–7
- Division place: 2nd NFC North
- Playoffs: Did not qualify
- Pro Bowlers: LB Lance Briggs

Uniform

The 2008 season was the Chicago Bears' 89th season in the National Football League (NFL), and the fifth under head coach Lovie Smith. They finished the 2008 season with a 9–7 record, improving upon their 7–9 record from the 2007 season. The Bears failed to qualify for the playoffs for the second consecutive season.

== Offseason ==
=== Offseason transactions ===
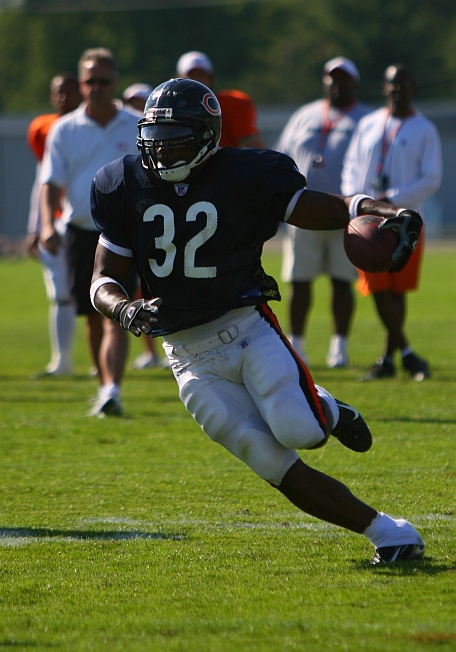
Cedric Benson, who led the Bears in rushing yards during the 2007 season, was waived from the team following two alcohol-related arrests.

Following their 7–9 finish in the 2007 season, the Bears were faced with many issues to address heading into the 2008 NFL season. In an interview, Jerry Angelo, the team's general manager, stated the Bears will seek to bring stability to their offense by creating competition for their current running backs and quarterbacks through free agency and the upcoming draft. The team's running game ranked near last in almost every statistical category, while the Bears had to rely on three different quarterbacks to finish the season. Additionally, the Bears were faced with many questions pertaining to their aging offensive line, which was ridden with injuries and inconsistent play throughout the 2007 season. A week before free agency started, the Bears opted to extend Alex Brown's contract, who recorded three sacks, two tackles for loss, one interception, five pass breakups, two forced fumbles, and one fumble recovery after reclaiming his starting job. The same day, the Bears parted with Muhsin Muhammad, Fred Miller, and Darwin Walker. A few days later, Jerry Angelo stated the franchise would not re-sign Ruben Brown, and suggested the team was in the process of rebuilding their offensive line. The Bears then focused their attention to their quarterbacks; re-signing Rex Grossman, and extending Kyle Orton's contract for another year. The team considered releasing Brian Griese in order to avoid a $300,000 dollar bonus, but eventually traded him to the Tampa Bay Buccaneers for a sixth round draft pick in the 2009 NFL Draft.

Finally, the Bears were left to deal with their top three free agents, Brendon Ayanbadejo, Bernard Berrian, and Lance Briggs. Berrian left the Bears to play with the Minnesota Vikings, agreeing to a six-year contract worth $42-million dollars. On the same day, the Bears signed Briggs to a six-year, $36 million contract. The Bears also decided not to pursue Ayanbadejo, and allowed him to sign with the Baltimore Ravens. With their top-two wide receivers gone, the team re-acquired Marty Booker, who had been released from the Miami Dolphins. The Bears also signed former Washington Redskins wide receiver Brandon Lloyd. The team then signed restricted free agent Rashied Davis to a one-year, $927,000 tender on April 18, and later signed him to a three-year contract worth $5.86 million. The Bears then released safety Adam Archuleta after the 2008 NFL draft.

The Bears were forced to also part with Cedric Benson after two run-ins with the law in Austin, Texas. Benson was first arrested for allegedly operating a boat while under the influence of alcohol. Only weeks after the incident, he was arrested again for reportedly driving while intoxicated. Benson denied the allegations that he was drunk and claimed that he was mistreated by the police on the first occasion. Angelo and Smith voiced a general sense of disappointment towards Benson's actions, and eventually opted to terminate his career with the organization. With Benson's departure the team had lost their passing (Griese), receiving (Berrian), and rushing (Benson) leaders from the previous season.

The Bears were reluctant to sign free agents to fill vacancies on their team. Angelo stated that he believed "free agency begins at home". The team invested a great deal of money in order to re-sign various players, including place kicker Robbie Gould, defensive tackle Tommie Harris, tight end Desmond Clark, and wide receiver Rashied Davis. Various veteran running backs, such as Kevin Jones, Ron Dayne, and Shaun Alexander, were reportedly interested in filling Benson's absence, The team acquired P.J. Pope and rookie Matt Lawrence for competition and depth, and later Jones in mid-July.

=== NFL draft ===
The Bears held the fourteenth overall pick in the 2008 NFL draft. In addition to their six other regular picks, the team acquired an additional third-round draft pick as a result of a trade with the San Diego Chargers. The Bears also traded third-round picks with the San Francisco 49ers, and obtained their fifth round pick as a result of attempting to negotiate with Lance Briggs's agent, Drew Rosenhaus, before the trading deadline in October 2007. The League has also awarded the Bears with three compensatory picks, which are all in the draft's seventh round.

As widely speculated by many draft analysts, The Bears used their first three draft picks to select offensive players. The team drafted Chris Williams from Vanderbilt to address holes in their offensive lines, Matt Forte from Tulane to help solidify their running game, and Earl Bennett to assist their wide receiver corp. Other rookies, such as Craig Steltz and Marcus Monk were drafted to provide additional depth and competition to their respective positions. The team also acquired several undrafted rookie after the draft. Caleb Hanie and Nick Hill were signed to add competition and extra depth to the Bears quarterback position. The Bears signed Williams, their last unsigned draft pick, on July 23, 2008.

As of the 2012 season, half of the drafted rookies (Marcus Harrison, Ervin Baldwin, Chester Adams, Joey LaRocque, Kirk Barton and Marcus Monk) are not on the team, with every 7th round pick (Baldwin, Adams, LaRocque, Barton, and Monk) by the team being gone by the end of the season (Baldwin is the lone exception).

2008 Chicago Bears draft
Round	Pick	Player	Position	College	Notes
1	14	Chris Williams	OT	Vanderbilt	
2	44	Matt Forte *	RB	Tulane	
3	70	Earl Bennett	WR	Vanderbilt	
3	90	Marcus Harrison	DT	Arkansas	
4	120	Craig Steltz	S	LSU	
5	142	Zack Bowman	CB	Nebraska	
5	158	Kellen Davis	TE	Michigan St	
7	208	Ervin Baldwin	DE	Michigan St	
7	222	Chester Adams	OG	Georgia	
7	243	Joey LaRocque	LB	Oregon State	
7	247	Kirk Barton	OT	Ohio St	
7	248	Marcus Monk	WR	Arkansas	
Made roster † Pro Football Hall of Fame * Made at least one Pro Bowl during career

=== Undrafted free agents ===
Name	Position	College
Zac Atterberry	Punter	Lindenwood
Cody Balogh	Tackle	Montana
Trey Brown	Cornerback	UCLA
Joe Clermond	Defensive end	Pittsburgh
Caleb Hanie	Quarterback	Colorado State
Nick Hill	Quarterback	Southern Illinois
Matt Lawrence	Running back	UMass
Gerard Lee	Defensive end	Oregon State
Shane Longest	Kicker	St. Xavier
Leslie Majors	Cornerback	Indiana
Nick Osborn	Defensive end	San Diego State
Ryan Poles	Guard	Boston College
Marcus Stone	Tight end	NC State

=== Mini camps ===
The Bears held several scattered mini-camp and Organized Team Activity (OTA) workouts throughout May, and up to mid-June. Brian Urlacher, who had previously stated he would forgo the team's mini-camps in order due to issues with his contract, was among several Bears players to attend the training sessions. All players who were previously injured in the previous season, including veteran safety Mike Brown and cornerback Nathan Vasher, were cleared to practice. The Bears concluded their mini-camp sessions on June 18, with rookie Matt Forte as the team's top running back.

=== Training camp ===
All members of the Bears reported to the team's summer training facility at Olivet Nazarene University in Bourbonnais, Illinois, except for Devin Hester, who missed the first two days of camp due to a contract dispute. Chris Williams, the team's top draft pick, missed the camp's first weekend after sustaining a minor back injury. He was later diagnosed with separate injury, a herniated disc, which required minor surgery to repair. The Bears had not given a time table pertaining to Williams' return. His fellow offensive lineman, Terrence Metcalf was also required to have surgery to repair his knee, and is also sidelined indefinitely. The Bears held their last training camp session of the summer on August 15, 2008. Lovie Smith was generally pleased with team's progress, and stated, "Guys were fighting for positions. All of them have stepped up and we'll just keep that evaluation going. To me, a successful camp a lot of times is when you get out injury free and we've done that for the most part. And again we've gotten good work done."

=== Gallery ===
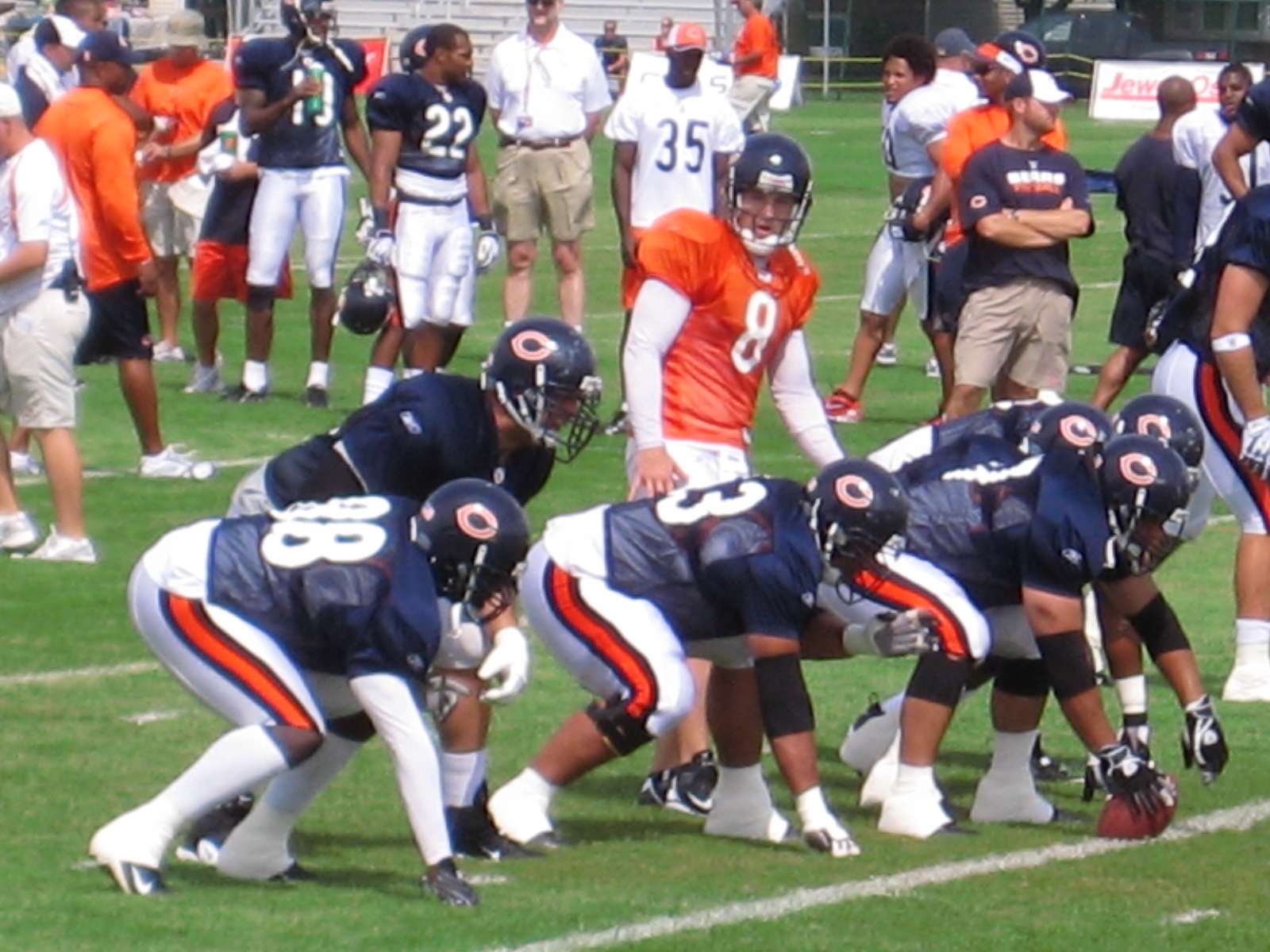
Quarterback Rex Grossman taking the snap

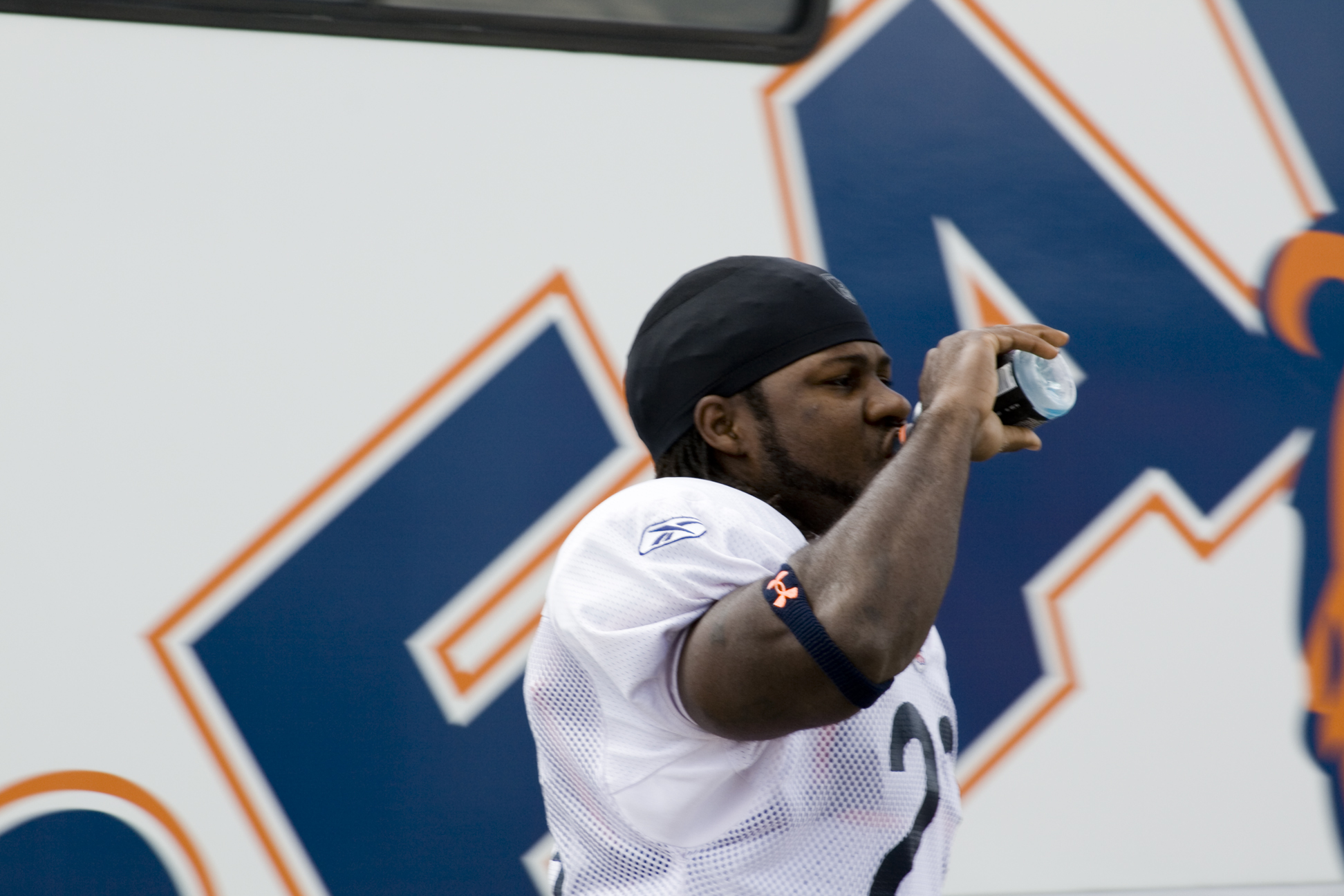
Receiver and returner Devin Hester during camp

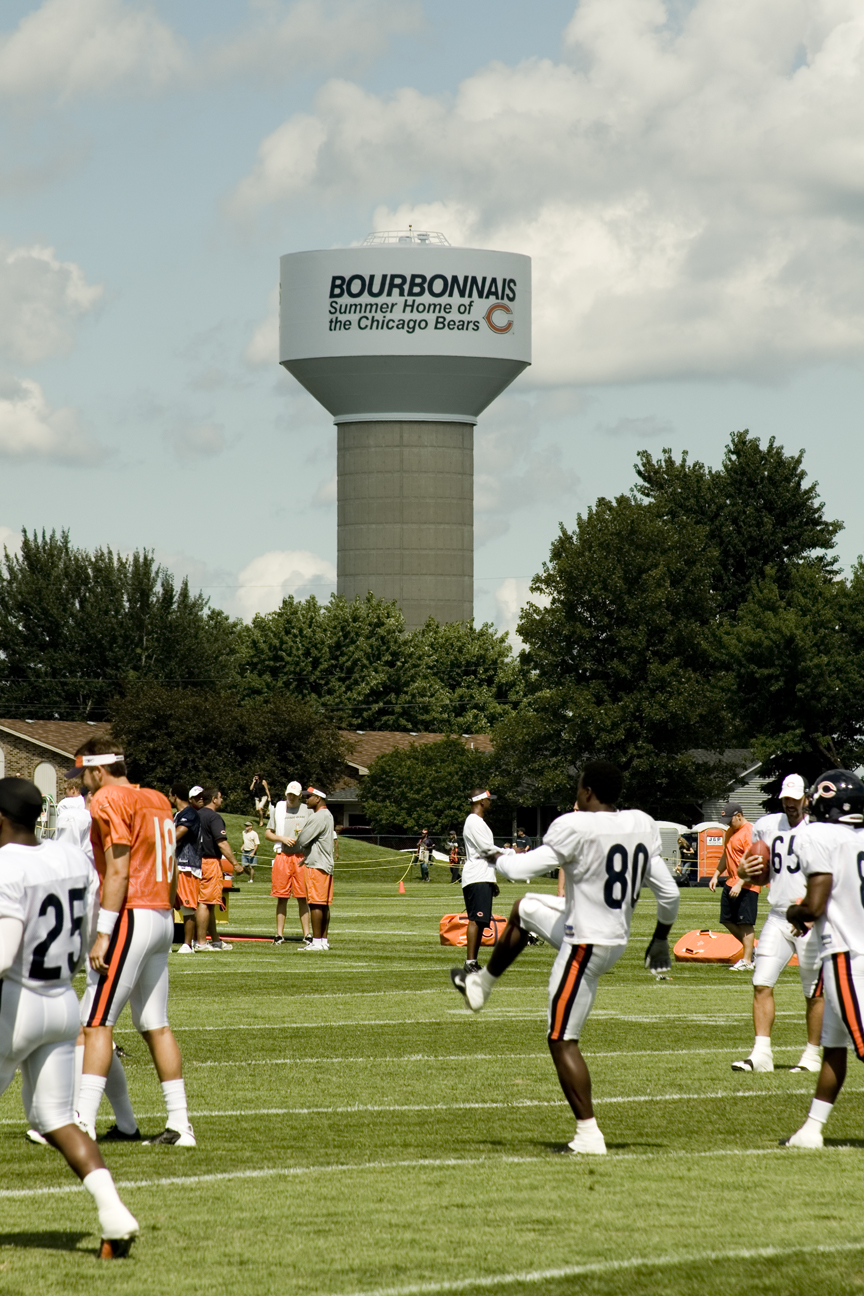
Players stretch during camp

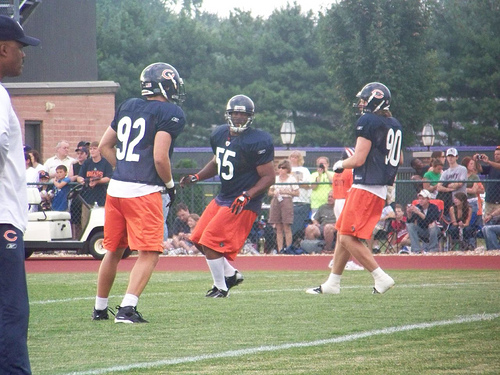
Linebackers Hunter Hillenmeyer (92) and Lance Briggs (55) during camp

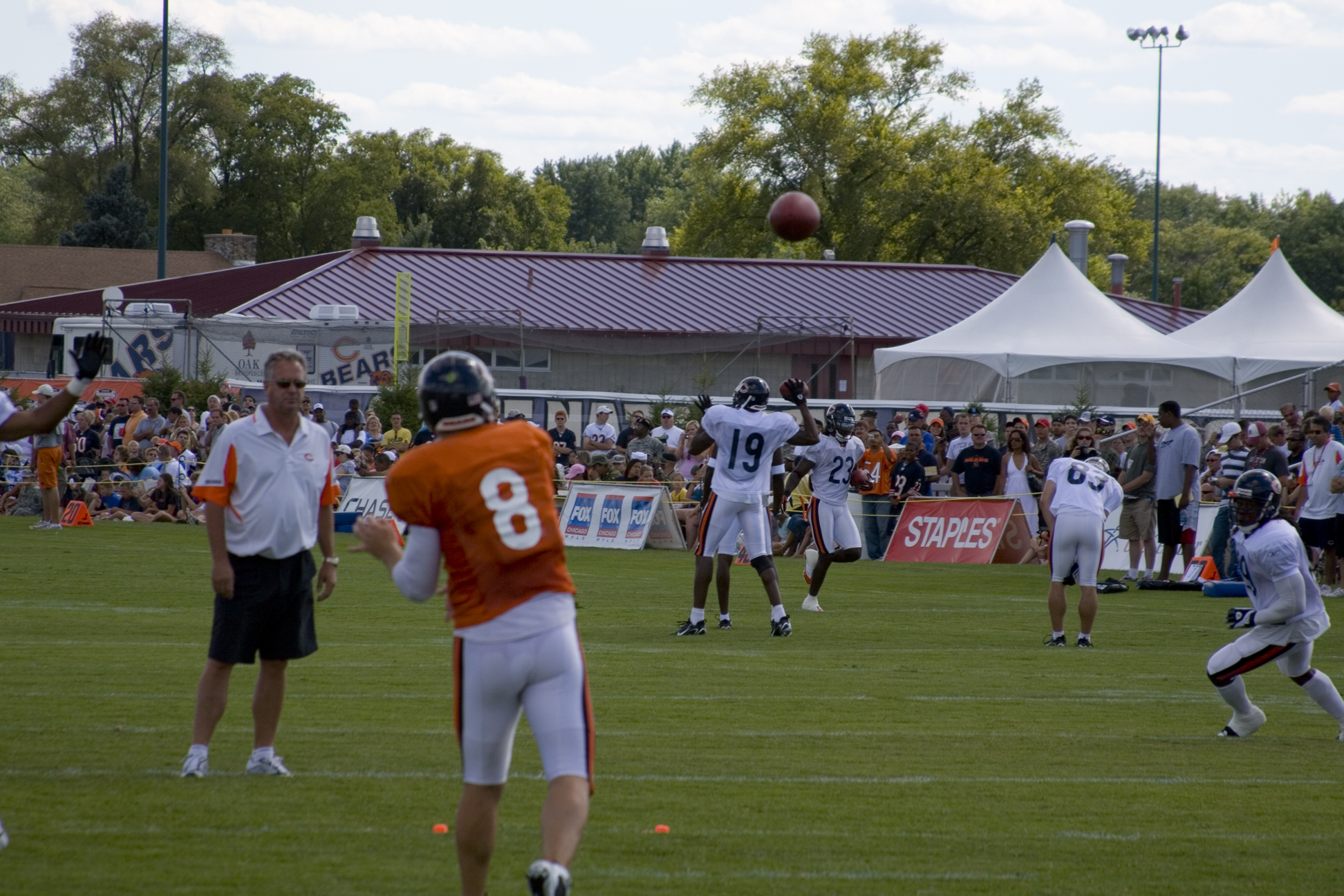
Grossman passes

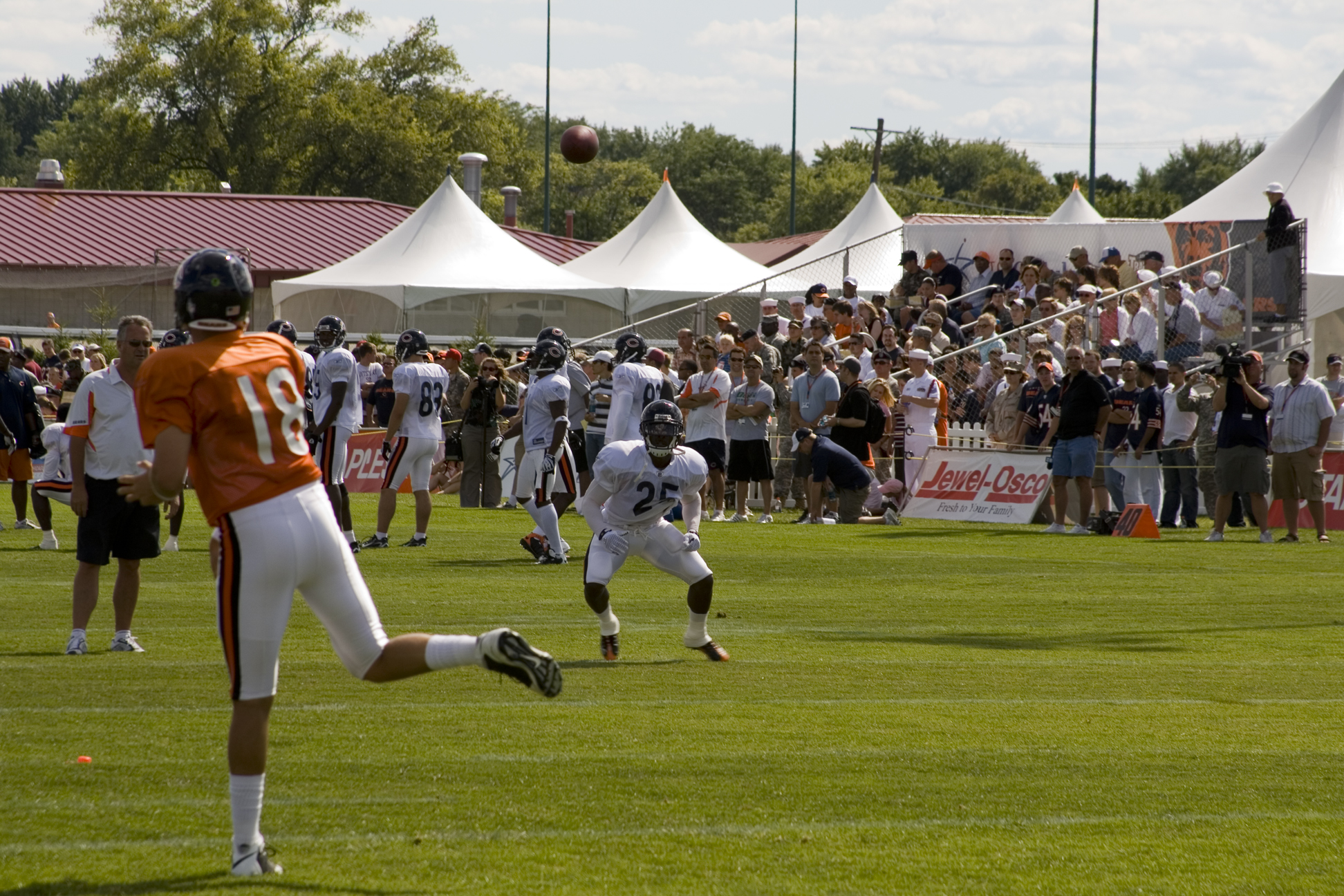
Grossman's counterpart and eventual starting quarterback Kyle Orton passes to running back Garrett Wolfe

== Staff ==
Chicago Bears 2008 staff
Front office: Owner – Virginia Halas McCaskey; Chairman – Michael McCaskey; President/CEO – Ted Phillips; General manager – Jerry Angelo; Senior director of football administration/general counsel – Cliff Stein; Director of pro personnel – Bobby DePaul; Director of college scouting – Greg Gabriel; Head coaches: Head coach – Lovie Smith; Football operations assistant – Andrew Hayes-Stoker; Offensive coaches: Offensive coordinator – Ron Turner; Quarterbacks – Pep Hamilton; Running backs – Tim Spencer; Wide receivers – Darryl Drake; Tight ends – Rob Boras; Offensive line – Harry Hiestand; Offensive assistant/assistant offensive line – Luke Butkus; Offensive assistant/assistant wide receivers – Charles London	Defensive coaches: Defensive coordinator – Bob Babich; Defensive line – Brick Haley; Linebackers – Lloyd Lee; Defensive backs – Steven Wilks; Safeties – Gill Byrd; Defensive assistant/assistant defensive backs – Eric Washington; Special teams coaches: Special teams – Dave Toub; Assistant special teams – Chris Tabor; Strength and conditioning: Director of physical development – Rusty Jones; Strength and conditioning – Jim Arthur; Assistant strength and conditioning – Ryan George

== Roster ==
2008 Chicago Bears roster
Quarterbacks (QB): 8 Rex Grossman; 12 Caleb Hanie; 18 Kyle Orton; Running backs (RB): 43 Jason Davis FB; 22 Matt Forte; 27 Kevin Jones; 37 Jason McKie FB; 29 Adrian Peterson; Wide receivers (WR): 19 Devin Aromashodu; 85 Earl Bennett; 86 Marty Booker; 81 Rashied Davis; 23 Devin Hester; 80 Brandon Lloyd; 84 Brandon Rideau; Tight ends (TE): 88 Desmond Clark; 87 Kellen Davis; 82 Greg Olsen	Offensive linemen (OL): 67 Josh Beekman G; 72 Dan Buenning G; 63 Roberto Garza G; 57 Olin Kreutz C; 60 Terrence Metcalf G; 78 John St. Clair T; 76 John Tait T; 74 Chris Williams T; Defensive linemen (DL): 95 Anthony Adams DT; 97 Mark Anderson DE; 99 Ervin Baldwin DE; 96 Alex Brown DE; 91 Tommie Harris DT; 94 Marcus Harrison DT; 71 Israel Idonije DE/DT; 93 Adewale Ogunleye DE; 75 Matt Toeaina DT	Linebackers (LB): 55 Lance Briggs OLB; 59 Gilbert Gardner MLB; 92 Hunter Hillenmeyer OLB; 90 Joey LaRocque OLB; 53 Nick Roach OLB; 54 Brian Urlacher MLB; 52 Jamar Williams OLB; Defensive backs (DB): 21 Corey Graham CB; 24 Marcus Hamilton CB; 38 Danieal Manning FS/KR; 26 Trumaine McBride CB; 44 Kevin Payne SS; 20 Craig Steltz SS; 33 Charles Tillman CB; 45 Cameron Worrell SS; Special teams (ST): 9 Robbie Gould K; 65 Patrick Mannelly LS; 4 Brad Maynard P	Practice squad: 79 Cody Balogh T; 15 John Broussard WR; 14 Rudy Burgess WR; 70 Joe Clermond DE; 83 Mike Hass WR; 89 Fontel Mines TE; 64 Tyler Reed G; 59 Marcus Riley LB; Reserve: 35 Zack Bowman CB (IR); 30 Mike Brown S (IR); 98 Dusty Dvoracek DT (IR); 58 Darrell McClover LB (IR); 36 Brandon McGowan S (IR); 69 Fred Miller T (IR); 31 Nathan Vasher CB (IR); 25 Garrett Wolfe RB (IR); Rookies in italics 53 active, 8 reserve, 8 practice squad

== Preseason ==
=== Schedule ===
Week	Date	Opponent	Result	Record	Venue	Recap
1	August 7	Kansas City Chiefs	L 20–24	0–1	Soldier Field	Recap
2	August 16	at Seattle Seahawks	L 26–29	0–2	Qwest Field	Recap
3	August 21	San Francisco 49ers	L 30–37	0–3	Soldier Field	Recap
4	August 28	at Cleveland Browns	W 16–10	1–3	Cleveland Browns Stadium	Recap

== Regular season ==
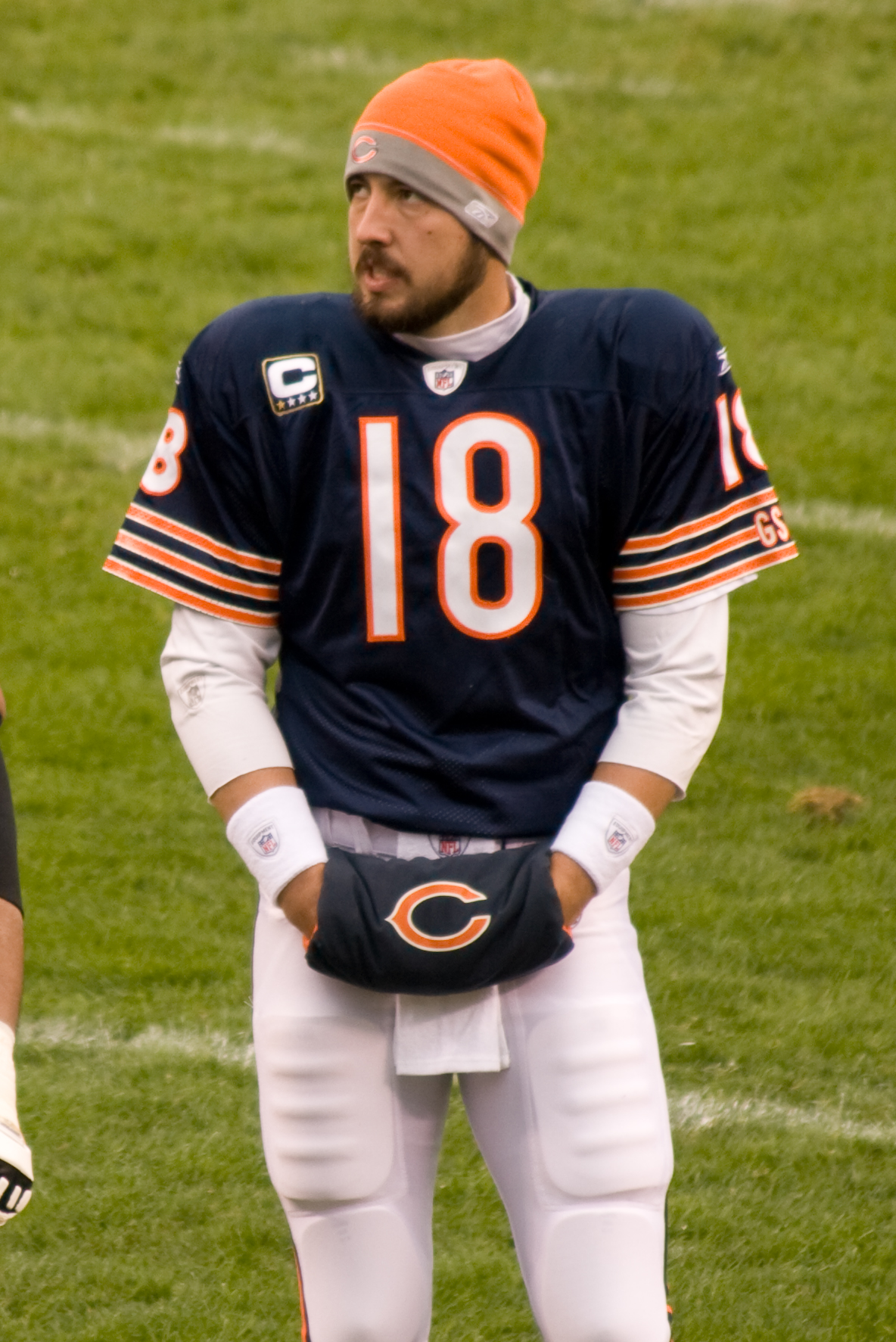
Lovie Smith named Kyle Orton as the team's starting quarterback for the 2008 season.

=== Schedule ===
Week	Date	Opponent	Result	Record	Venue	Recap
1	September 7	at Indianapolis Colts	W 29–13	1–0	Lucas Oil Stadium	Recap
2	September 14	at Carolina Panthers	L 17–20	1–1	Bank of America Stadium	Recap
3	September 21	Tampa Bay Buccaneers	L 24–27 (OT)	1–2	Soldier Field	Recap
4	September 28	Philadelphia Eagles	W 24–20	2–2	Soldier Field	Recap
5	October 5	at Detroit Lions	W 34–7	3–2	Ford Field	Recap
6	October 12	at Atlanta Falcons	L 20–22	3–3	Georgia Dome	Recap
7	October 19	Minnesota Vikings	W 48–41	4–3	Soldier Field	Recap
8	Bye					
9	November 2	Detroit Lions	W 27–23	5–3	Soldier Field	Recap
10	November 9	Tennessee Titans	L 14–21	5–4	Soldier Field	Recap
11	November 16	at Green Bay Packers	L 3–37	5–5	Lambeau Field	Recap
12	November 23	at St. Louis Rams	W 27–3	6–5	Edward Jones Dome	Recap
13	November 30	at Minnesota Vikings	L 14–34	6–6	Hubert H. Humphrey Metrodome	Recap
14	December 7	Jacksonville Jaguars	W 23–10	7–6	Soldier Field	Recap
15	December 11	New Orleans Saints	W 27–24 (OT)	8–6	Soldier Field	Recap
16	December 22	Green Bay Packers	W 20–17 (OT)	9–6	Soldier Field	Recap
17	December 28	at Houston Texans	L 24–31	9–7	Reliant Stadium	Recap

=== Standings ===
NFC North
	W	L	T	PCT	DIV	CONF	PF	PA	STK
^{(3)} Minnesota Vikings	10	6	0	.625	4–2	8–4	379	333	W1
Chicago Bears	9	7	0	.563	4–2	7–5	375	350	L1
Green Bay Packers	6	10	0	.375	4–2	5–7	419	380	W1
Detroit Lions	0	16	0	.000	0–6	0–12	268	517	L16

=== Week 1: at Indianapolis Colts ===
The Bears began their 2008 season by recording an upset victory over the Indianapolis Colts at the newly opened Lucas Oil Stadium. The team won the Super Bowl XLI rematch, by a score of 29–13. The Bears offensive attack featured the debut of rookie running back Matt Forté, becoming the first Bears rookie running back to start a game since Walter Payton in 1975, coincidentally against the Baltimore Colts (Anthony Thomas also started as a running back for the Bears in 2001). Forte carried the ball 23 times for 123 yards, including a 50-yard touchdown run. The Colts and Bears exchanged field goals, and then Joseph Addai was dropped for a safety. A Robbie Gould 25-yard field goal on the following drive ended the 1st half.

Peyton Manning helped the Colts narrow their deficit by throwing a six-yard touchdown pass to Reggie Wayne. Later in the 3rd quarter, Bears cornerback Charles Tillman forced a fumble, which Lance Briggs picked up and returned for a 21-yard touchdown. The Bears defense was able to contain the Colts the rest of the way, including a key fourth down and one yard stop near midfield early in the fourth quarter. The Bears essentially sealed their victory with 8:56 left on a one-yard touchdown run by fullback Jason McKie. After the game, Al Michaels and John Madden awarded Forte with the Sunday Night Football's "Horse Trailer Player of the Game" award. Adewale Ogunleye received the NFC Defensive Player of the Week award for recording a safety, three tackles-for-loss, and making a key fourth down stop during the game.

Week One: Chicago Bears at Indianapolis Colts— Game summary

- Game time: 8:15 PM EDT/7:15 PM CDT
- Game weather: 74 °F (23 °C), Mostly cloudy
- TV announcers (NBC): Al Michaels, John Madden and Andrea Kremer
- Game attendance: 66,822 at Lucas Oil Stadium, Indianapolis, Indiana
- Referee: John Parry

First quarter

- IND – 5:52 – Adam Vinatieri 39 yd FG (IND 3–0)
- CHI – 4:59 – Matt Forté 50 yd TD run (Robbie Gould kick) (CHI 7–3)

Second quarter

- IND – 9:38 – Adam Vinatieri 34 yd FG (CHI 7–6)
- CHI – 4:43 – Robbie Gould 41 yd FG (CHI 10–6)
- CHI – 4:05 – Safety, Joseph Addai tackled in end zone by Adewale Ogunleye (CHI 12–6)
- CHI – 0:00 – Robbie Gould 25 yd FG (CHI 15–6)

Third quarter

- IND – 9:18 – 6 yd TD pass from Peyton Manning to Reggie Wayne (Vinatieri kick) (CHI 15–13)
- CHI – 1:52 – Lance Briggs 21 yd fumble return TD (Gould kick) (CHI 22–13)

Fourth quarter

- CHI – 8:56 – Jason McKie 1 yd TD run (Gould kick) (CHI 29–13)

	1	2	3	4	Total
Bears	7	8	7	7	29
Colts	3	3	7	0	13

Top passers

- CHI – Orton – 13/21, 150 yards, 0 TD – 0 INT
- IND – Manning – 30/49, 257 yards, 1 TD – 0 INT

Top rushers

- CHI – Forté – 23 carries, 123 yards, 1 TD
- IND – Addai – 12 carries, 44 yards

Top receivers

- CHI – Clark – 2 receptions, 46 yards
- IND – Wayne – 10 receptions, 86 yards

Top tacklers

- CHI – Urlacher – 8 tackles
- IND – Keiaho – 8 tackles

=== Week 2: at Carolina Panthers ===
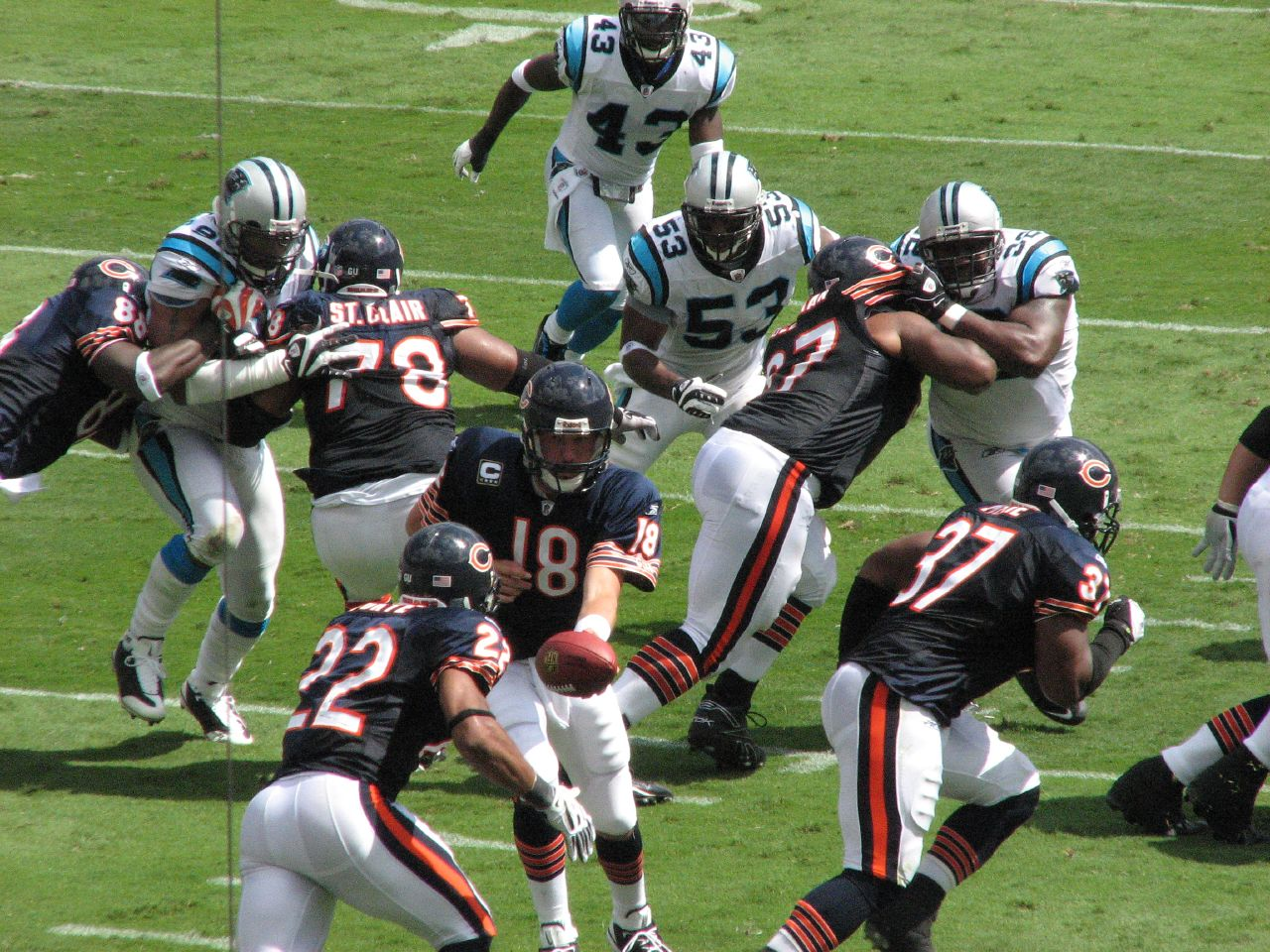
Kyle Orton handing the ball off to Matt Forté

Coming off their upset road win over the Colts, the Bears flew to Bank of America Stadium for a Week 2 intraconference duel with the Carolina Panthers. In the first quarter, Chicago struck first as WR Brandon Lloyd returned a blocked punt 9 yards for a touchdown. In the second quarter, the Bears added onto their lead as kicker Robbie Gould got a 26-yard field goal. The Panthers would respond with kicker John Kasay getting a 37-yard field goal. In the third quarter, Chicago added onto its lead with FB Jason McKie getting a 1-yard TD run. However, Carolina started to rally as Kasay nailed a 45-yard field goal, along with RB Jonathan Stewart getting a 4-yard TD run. In the fourth quarter, the Panthers closed out its game-winning rally with Stewart getting a 1-yard TD run.

With the loss, the Bears fell to 1–1.

Week Two: Chicago Bears vs. Carolina Panthers— Game summary

- Game time: 1:00 PM EST/12:00 PM CST
- Game weather: 88 °F (31 °C) (Partly Cloudy)
- Game attendance: 73,828 at Bank of America Stadium, Charlotte, North Carolina
- Referee: Ron Winter
- TV announcers (Fox): Sam Rosen, Tim Ryan, & Chris Myers

First quarter

- CHI – 13:00 – Brandon Lloyd 9 yd blocked punt return TD (Robbie Gould kick) (CHI 7–0)

Second quarter

- CHI – 7:51 – Robbie Gould 26 yd FG (CHI 10–0)
- CAR – 0:12 – John Kasay 37 yd FG (CHI 10–3)

Third quarter

- CHI – 9:23 – Jason McKie 1 yd TD run (Gould kick) (CHI 17–3)
- CAR – 5:23 – John Kasay 45 yd FG (CHI 17–6)
- CAR – 2:18 – Jonathan Stewart 4 yd TD run (Kasay kick) (CHI 17–13)

Fourth quarter

- CAR – 3:52 – Jonathan Stewart 1 yd TD run (Kasay kick) (CAR 20–17)

	1	2	3	4	Total
Bears	7	3	7	0	17
Panthers	0	3	10	7	20

Top passers

- CHI – Orton – 19/32, 149 yards, 0 TD – 0 INT
- CAR – Delhomme – 12/21, 128 yards, 0 TD – 1 INT

Top rushers

- CHI – Forte – 23 carries, 92 yards
- CAR – Stewart – 14 carries, 77 yards, 2 TDs

Top receivers

- CHI – Clark – 5 receptions, 66 yards
- CAR – Muhammad – 5 receptions, 59 yards

Top tacklers

- CHI – Payne – 6 tackles
- CAR – Beason – 8 tackles

=== Week 3: vs. Tampa Bay Buccaneers ===
	1	2	3	4	OT	Total
Buccaneers	7	7	0	10	3	27
Bears	6	3	8	7	0	24

at Soldier Field, Chicago

- Game time: Sunday September 21, 2008 – 1:00 p.m. EDT / 12:00 p.m. CDT
- Game weather: 76 °F (24 °C), Partly cloudy
- Television announcers (Fox): Sam Rosen, Tim Ryan, & Chris Myers
- Game attendance: 62,051
- Referee: Tony Corrente

Hoping to rebound from their road loss to the Panthers, the Bears played their Week 3 home opener against the Tampa Bay Buccaneers, who were led by former Bears QB Brian Griese.

In the first quarter, Chicago got the early lead as kicker Robbie Gould got a 40-yard and a 43-yard field goal. The Buccaneers would respond with Griese completing a 4-yard TD pass to WR Ike Hilliard. In the second quarter, Tampa Bay increased its lead with DE Gaines Adams returning an interception 45 yards for a touchdown. The Bears closed out the half with Gould's 28-yard field goal.

In the third quarter, Chicago took the lead with QB Kyle Orton completing a 6-yard TD pass to rookie RB Matt Forté (along with Orton's 2-point conversion pass to WR Brandon Lloyd). In the fourth quarter, the Bears increased their lead with Orton completing a 19-yard TD pass to Lloyd. However, the Buccaneers rallied with kicker Matt Bryant getting a 35-yard field goal, along with Griese's 1-yard TD pass to TE Jerramy Stevens. In overtime, Tampa Bay got the victory as Bryant nailed the game-winning 21-yard field goal. The loss represented the Bears second consecutive loss as a result of a blown fourth quarter lead.

With the loss, the Bears fell to 1–2.

==== Scoring summary ====
Q1 – CHI – 12:43 – Robbie Gould 40 yd FG (CHI 3–0)

Q1 – CHI – 6:10 – Robbie Gould 43 yd FG (CHI 6–0)

Q1 – TB – 1:50 – 4 yd TD pass from Brian Griese to Ike Hilliard (Matt Bryant kick) (TB 7–6)

Q2 – TB – 5:26 – Gaines Adams 45 yd interception return TD (Bryant kick) (Bryant kick) (TB 14–6)

Q2 – CHI – 0:00 – Robbie Gould 28 yd FG (TB 14–9)

Q3 – CHI – 2:54 – 6 yd TD pass from Kyle Orton to Matt Forté (2-pt conversion pass from Kyle Orton to Brandon Lloyd) (CHI 17–14)

Q4 – CHI – 6:38 – 19 yd TD pass from Kyle Orton to Brandon Lloyd (Gould kick) (CHI 24–14)

Q4 – TB – 3:11 – Matt Bryant 35 yd FG (CHI 24–17)

Q4 – TB – 0:07 – 1 yd TD pass from Brian Griese to Jerramy Stevens (Bryant kick) (Tied 24–24)

OT – TB – 4:21 – Matt Bryant 21 yd FG (TB 27–24)

=== Week 4: vs. Philadelphia Eagles ===
	1	2	3	4	Total
Eagles	7	7	3	3	20
Bears	7	14	0	3	24

at Soldier Field, Chicago

- Game time: 8:15 p.m. EDT/7:15 p.m. CDT
- Game weather: 65 °F (18 °C) (Cloudy)
- Television announcers (NBC): Al Michaels, John Madden, & Andrea Kremer
- Game attendance: 62,099
- Referee: Walt Coleman

The Bears remained a home for week four's Sunday night duel with the Philadelphia Eagles, led by Chicago native Donovan McNabb.

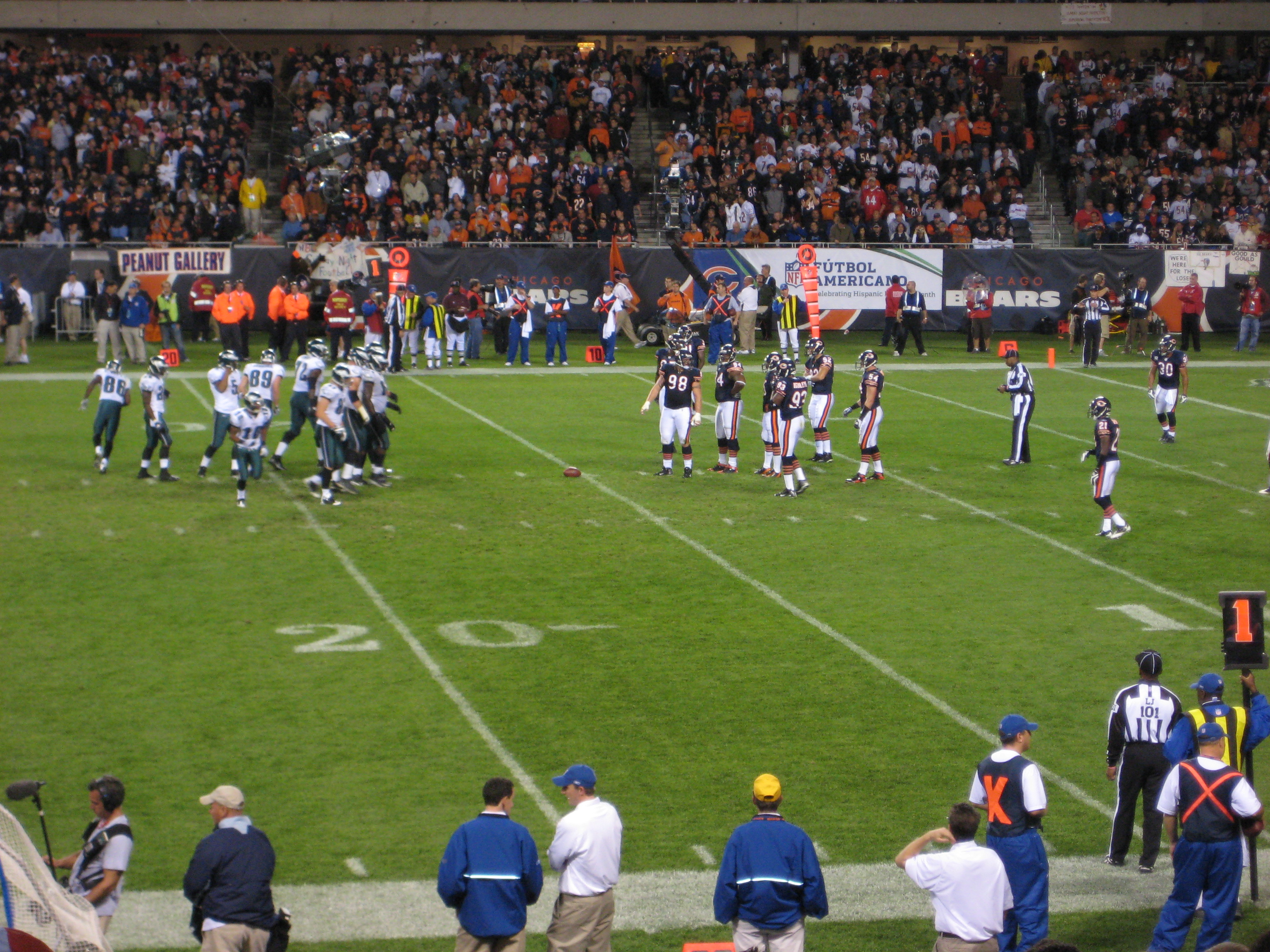
The Bears defense and Eagles offense head to the line of scrimmage

In the first quarter, the Bears drew first blood as QB Kyle Orton completed a 19-yard TD pass to TE Greg Olsen. The Eagles responded with McNabb completing a 22-yard TD pass to WR DeSean Jackson. In the second quarter, Chicago responded with Orton completing a 23-yard TD pass to WR Marty Booker. Philadelphia responded with RB Correll Buckhalter getting a 1-yard TD run. The Bears closed out the half with Orton completing a 20-yard TD pass to WR/KR Devin Hester.

In the third quarter, the Eagles drew closer as kicker David Akers got a 24-yard field goal. In the fourth quarter, Philadelphia got even closer with Akers kicking a 31-yard field goal. Chicago answered with kicker Robbie Gould nailing a 41-yard field goal. The Eagles were able to mount an offensive drive in the fourth quarter, but after getting a first down at CHI 4, the Eagles were stopped on 3 straight plays from the 1, turning the ball over on downs. The Bears managed to get a first down on the subsequent drive, milking most of the remaining time and allowed the Bears to walk away with a 24–20 victory.

==== Scoring summary ====
Q1 – CHI – 13:05 – 19 yd TD pass from Kyle Orton to Greg Olsen (Robbie Gould kick) (CHI 7–0)

Q1 – PHI – 8:49 – 22 yd TD pass from Donovan McNabb to DeSean Jackson (David Akers kick (7–7)

Q2 – CHI – 13:58 – 23 yd TD pass from Kyle Orton to Marty Booker (Gould kick) (CHI 14–7)

Q2 – PHI – 11:40 – Correll Buckhalter 1 yd TD run (Akers kick) (14–14)

Q2 – CHI – 1:16 – 20 yd TD pass from Kyle Orton to Devin Hester (Gould kick) (CHI 21–14)

Q3 – PHI – 4:22 – David Akers 24 yd FG (CHI 21–17)

Q4 – PHI – 13:21 – David Akers 31 yd FG (CHI 21–20)

Q4 – CHI – 10:28 – Robbie Gould 41 yd FG (CHI 24–20)

=== Week 5: at Detroit Lions ===
	1	2	3	4	Total
Bears	3	14	14	3	34
Lions	0	0	7	0	7

at Ford Field, Detroit, Michigan

- Game time: 1:00 PM EDT/12:00 PM CDT
- Game weather: None (Domed Stadium)
- TV announcers (Fox): Matt Vasgersian, Brian Baldinger, Brian Billick, & Laura Okmin
- Game attendance: 59,790
- Referee: Scott Green

Coming off their Sunday night home win over the Eagles, the Bears flew to Ford Field for a Week 5 NFC North duel with the Detroit Lions. In the first quarter, Chicago drew first blood as kicker Robbie Gould got a 37-yard field goal. In the second quarter, the Bears increased their lead with QB Kyle Orton completing a 9-yard TD pass to rookie RB Matt Forté and a 12-yard TD pass to WR/KR Devin Hester. In the third quarter, Chicago continued its domination with Forté getting a 1-yard TD run, along with CB Charles Tillman returning an interception 26 yards for a touchdown. Afterwards, the Lions would get their only score of the game as RB Kevin Smith got a 12-yard TD run. In the fourth quarter, the Bears closed out the game with Gould nailing a 45-yard field goal.

With the win, Chicago improved to 3–2.

==== Scoring summary ====
Q1 – CHI – 6:48 – Robbie Gould 37 yd FG (CHI 3–0)

Q2 – CHI – 5:27 – 9 yd TD pass from Kyle Orton to Matt Forté (Gould kick) (CHI 10–0)

Q2 – CHI – 1:56 – 12 yd TD pass from Kyle Orton to Devin Hester (Gould kick) (CHI 17–0)

Q3 – CHI – 11:17 – Matt Forté 1 yd TD run (Gould kick) (CHI 24–0)

Q3 – CHI – 10:10 – Charles Tillman 26 yd interception return TD (Gould kick) (CHI 31–0)

Q4 – DET – 7:08 – Kevin Smith 12 yd TD run (Jason Hanson kick) (CHI 31–7)

Q4 – CHI – 11:58 – Robbie Gould 45 yd FG (CHI 34–7)

=== Week 6: at Atlanta Falcons ===
	1	2	3	4	Total
Bears	0	3	7	10	20
Falcons	6	3	3	10	22

at Georgia Dome, Atlanta

- Game time: 1:00 PM EDT/12:00 PM CDT
- Game weather: None (Domed Stadium)
- TV announcers (Fox): Thom Brennaman & Brian Billick
- Game attendance: 64,096
- Referee: Alberto Riveron

Coming off their divisional road win over the Lions, the Bears flew to the Georgia Dome for a Week 6 duel with the Atlanta Falcons. In the first quarter, Chicago trailed early as Falcons kicker Jason Elam got a 29-yard and a 48-yard field goal. In the second quarter, Atlanta increased its lead with Elam getting a 32-yard field goal. The Bears would get on the board as kicker Robbie Gould got a 36-yard field goal.

In the third quarter, the Falcons kept increasing their lead as Elam kicked a 41-yard field goal. Chicago began to threaten as rookie RB Matt Forté got a 3-yard TD run. In the fourth quarter, Atlanta answered with QB Matt Ryan completing a 3-yard TD pass to WR Roddy White. The Bears would take the lead as Gould got a 32-yard field goal, and QB Kyle Orton completed an apparent game-winning 17-yard TD pass to WR Rashied Davis with 11 seconds remaining. However, after a poorly performed squib kick and a quick 26-yd pass play which got the Falcons to within the CHI 30 with only 1 second left, the Falcons escaped with a win as Elam nailed the game-winning 48-yard field goal.

With the loss, the Bears fell to 3–3.

==== Scoring summary ====
Q1 – ATL – 9:13 – Jason Elam 29 yd FG (ATL 3–0)

Q1 – ATL – 0:59 – Jason Elam 48 yd FG (ATL 6–0)

Q2 – ATL – 7:49 – Jason Elam 32 yd FG (ATL 9–0)

Q2 – CHI – 4:02 – Robbie Gould 36 yd FG (ATL 9–3)

Q3 – ATL – 10:36 – Jason Elam 41 yd FG (ATL 12–3)

Q3 – CHI – 2:24 – Matt Forté 3 yd TD run (Gould kick) (ATL 12–10)

Q4 – ATL – 13:25 – 3 yd TD pass from Matt Ryan to Roddy White (Elam kick) (ATL 19–10)

Q4 – CHI – 4:00 – Robbie Gould 32 yd FG (ATL 19–13)

Q4 – CHI – 0:11 – 17 yd TD pass from Kyle Orton to Rashied Davis (Gould kick) (CHI 20–19)

Q4 – ATL – 0:00 – Jason Elam 48 yd FG (ATL 22–20)

=== Week 7: vs. Minnesota Vikings ===
	1	2	3	4	Total
Vikings	14	10	7	10	41
Bears	14	13	14	7	48

at Soldier Field, Chicago

- Game time: 1:00 p.m. EDT / 12:00 p.m. CDT
- Game weather: 58 °F (14 °C) (Partly Cloudy)
- Television announcers (Fox): Sam Rosen, Tim Ryan, & Charissa Thompson
- Game attendance: 62,235
- Referee: Carl Cheffers

Hoping to rebound from their last-second road loss to the Falcons, the Bears went home, donned their alternate uniforms, and played a Week 7 NFC North duel with the Minnesota Vikings. In the first quarter, Chicago trailed early as Vikings RB Adrian Peterson got a 1-yard TD run. The Bears responded with QB Kyle Orton completing an 18-yard TD pass to TE Greg Olsen, along with RB Garrett Wolfe returning a blocked punt 17 yards for a touchdown. Minnesota would answer with QB Gus Frerotte completing a 24-yard TD pass to TE Visanthe Shiancoe. In the second quarter, it was back and forth. Chicago kicker Robbie Gould would get a 26-yard field goal, while Vikings kicker Ryan Longwell got a 42-yard field goal. Bears rookie CB Zackary Bowman would recover a fumble from Minnesota's endzone for a touchdown, while Vikings RB Chester Taylor got a 1-yard TD run. Chicago closed out the half as Gould got a 48-yard field goal.

In the third quarter, the high-scoring mayhem continued as WR Rashied Davis recovered a fumble within Minnesota's endzone for a touchdown. The Vikings would reply with Peterson getting a 54-yard TD run. Afterwards, the Bears increased their lead as Orton completed a 51-yard TD pass to WR Marty Booker. In the fourth quarter, Chicago continued its run as rookie RB Matt Forté got a 1-yard TD run. Minnesota tried to rally as Longwell nailed a 23-yard field goal, along with Frerotte completing a 5-yard TD pass to former Bears WR Bernard Berrian. Fortunately, Chicago's defense got the game-winning interception to seal the deal.

With the win, the Bears went into their bye week at 4–3.

The 89 combined points became the highest single-game scoring total in the history of the Bears/Vikings rivalry.

==== Scoring summary ====
Q1 – MIN – 9:18 – Adrian Peterson 1 yd TD run (Ryan Longwell kick) (MIN 7–0)

Q1 – CHI – 6:43 – 18 yd TD pass from Kyle Orton to Greg Olsen (Robbie Gould kick) (7–7)

Q1 – CHI – 5:43 – Garrett Wolfe 17 yd blocked punt return TD (Gould kick) (CHI 14–7)

Q1 – MIN – 2:18 – 24 yd TD pass from Gus Frerotte to Visanthe Shiancoe (Longwell kick) (14–14)

Q2 – CHI – 13:33 – Robbie Gould 26 yd FG (CHI 17–14)

Q2 – MIN – 9:10 – Ryan Longwell 42 yd FG (17–17)

Q2 – CHI – 4:58 – Zackary Bowman 0 yd fumble return TD (Gould kick) (CHI 24–17)

Q2 – MIN – 0:22 – Chester Taylor 1 yd TD run (Longwell kick) (24–24)

Q2 – CHI – 0:00 – Robbie Gould 48 yd FG (CHI 27–24)

Q3 – CHI – 12:12 – Rashied Davis 0 yd fumble recovery TD (Gould kick) (CHI 34–24)

Q3 – MIN – 10:40 – Adrian Peterson 54 yd TD run (Longwell kick) (CHI 34–31)

Q3 – CHI – 2:35 – 51 yd TD pass from Kyle Orton to Marty Booker (Gould kick) (CHI 41–31)

Q4 – CHI – 14:53 – Matt Forté 1 yd TD run (Gould kick) (CHI 48–31)

Q4 – MIN – 5:54 – Ryan Longwell 23 yd FG (CHI 48–34)

Q4 – MIN – 3:00 – 5 yd TD pass from Gus Frerotte to Bernard Berrian (Longwell kick) (CHI 48–41)

=== Week 9: vs. Detroit Lions ===
	1	2	3	4	Total
Lions	0	23	0	0	23
Bears	10	3	7	7	27

at Soldier Field, Chicago

- Game time: 1:00 PM EDT / 12:00 PM CDT
- Game weather: 60 °F (16 °C) (Mostly cloudy)
- Game attendance: 62,188
- Referee: Pete Morelli
- TV announcers: (Fox): Sam Rosen, Tim Ryan and Chris Myers

Coming off their bye week, the Bears stayed at home for a Week 9 NFC North rematch with the Detroit Lions. In the first quarter, Chicago drew first blood as kicker Robbie Gould got a 36-yard field goal, while QB Kyle Orton got a 5-yard TD run. In the second quarter, the Lions responded with RB Kevin Smith getting a 1-yard TD run, along with QB Dan Orlovsky completing a 17-yard TD pass to WR Calvin Johnson and a 14-yard TD pass to WR Shaun McDonald. The Bears would respond with Gould getting a 41-yard field goal, yet Detroit replied with kicker Jason Hanson getting a 52-yard field goal.

In the third quarter, Chicago began to rally as QB Rex Grossman completed a 6-yard TD pass to WR Rashied Davis. In the fourth quarter, the Bears completed their comeback as Grossman got a 1-yard TD run. The Lions tried to come back, but Chicago's defense prevented any possible rally from happening.

With the season-sweep, the Bears improved to 5–3.

Kyle Orton (8/14 for 108 yards) left the game in the second quarter with a sprained right ankle.

==== Scoring summary ====
Q1 – CHI – 11:19 – Robbie Gould 36 yd FG (CHI 3–0)

Q1 – CHI – 4:40 – Kyle Orton 5 yd TD run (Gould kick) (CHI 10–0)

Q2 – DET – 13:25 – Kevin Smith 1 yd TD run (Jason Hanson kick blocked) (CHI 10–6)

Q2 – DET – 13:14 – 17 yd TD pass from Dan Orlovsky to Calvin Johnson (Hanson kick) (DET 13–10)

Q2 – DET – 6:55 – 14 yd TD pass from Dan Orlovsky to Shaun McDonald (Hanson kick) (DET 20–10)

Q2 – CHI – 4:46 – Robbie Gould 41 yd FG (DET 20–13)

Q2 – DET – 1:10 – Jason Hanson 52 yd FG (DET 23–13)

Q3 – CHI – 7:05 – 6 yd TD pass from Rex Grossman to Rashied Davis (Gould kick) (DET 23–20)

Q4 – CHI – 5:44 – Rex Grossman 1 yd TD run (Gould kick) (CHI 27–23)

=== Week 10: vs. Tennessee Titans ===
	1	2	3	4	Total
Titans	0	7	7	7	21
Bears	7	0	0	7	14

at Soldier Field, Chicago

- Game time: 1:00 PM EDT / 12:00 PM CDT
- Game weather: 37 °F (3 °C) (Cloudy)
- Game attendance: 62,124
- Referee: Ed Hochuli
- TV announcers: (CBS): Greg Gumbel & Dan Dierdorf

Coming off their season-sweep over the Lions, the Bears stayed at home for a Week 10 interconference duel with the unbeaten Tennessee Titans. With QB Kyle Orton nursing an almost-healed right ankle, QB Rex Grossman was given the start.

In the first quarter, Chicago struck first as Grossman completed a 5-yard TD pass to rookie RB Matt Forté. In the second quarter, the Titans responded with QB Kerry Collins completing a 10-yard TD pass to TE Bo Scaife. In the third quarter, Tennessee took the lead as Collins completed a 12-yard TD pass to former Bears WR Justin Gage. In the fourth quarter, the Titans increased their lead as RB LenDale White got a 2-yard TD run. Chicago tried to rally as Grossman got a 1-yard TD run. However, Tennessee's defense stiffened for the win.

With the loss, the Bears fell to 5–4.

==== Scoring summary ====
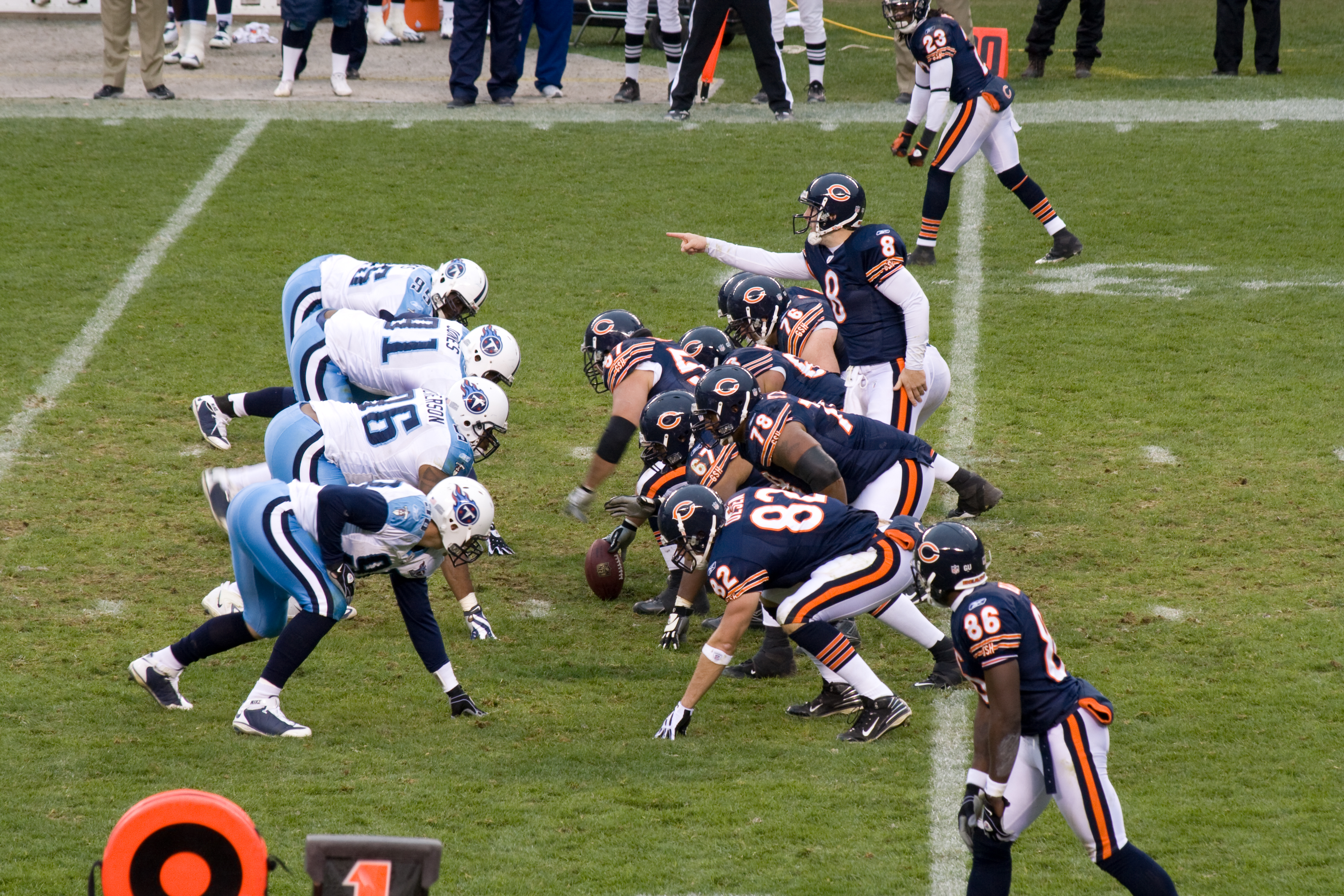
Rex Grossman points out the defense scheme before the snap.

Q1 – CHI – 7:11 – 5 yd TD pass from Rex Grossman to Matt Forté (Robbie Gould kick) (CHI 7–0)

Q2 – TEN – 8:45 – 10 yd TD pass from Kerry Collins to Bo Scaife (Rob Bironas kick) (7–7)

Q3 – TEN – 11:34 – 12 yd TD pass from Kerry Collins to Justin Gage (Bironas kick) (TEN 14–7)

Q4 – TEN – 12:09 – LenDale White 2 yd TD run (Bironas kick) (TEN 21–7)

Q4 – CHI – 5:00 – Rex Grossman 1 yd TD run (Gould kick) (TEN 21–14)

=== Week 11: at Green Bay Packers ===
Hoping to rebound from their home loss to the Titans, the Bears flew to Lambeau Field for a Week 11 NFC North duel with their hated rival, the Green Bay Packers. In the first quarter, Chicago trailed early as Packers QB Aaron Rodgers completed a 3-yard TD pass to WR Greg Jennings. In the second quarter, the Bears got on the board with kicker Robbie Gould getting a 35-yard field goal. Green Bay would answer with RB Ryan Grant getting a 4-yard TD run, along with kicker Mason Crosby getting a 53-yard field goal.

In the third quarter, Chicago continued to trail as Rodgers completed a 5-yard TD pass to TE Donald Lee. In the fourth quarter, the Packers pulled away as Crosby made a 33-yard field goal, DE Jason Hunter returned a fumble 54 yards for a touchdown, and Crosby nailing a 45-yard field goal.

With the loss, the Bears fell to 5–5.

Week Eleven: Chicago Bears at Green Bay Packers— Game summary

- Game time: 1:00 p.m. EDT/12:00 p.m. CDT
- Game weather: 33 °F (1 °C) (Mostly Cloudy)
- Game attendance: 71,040 at Lambeau Field, Green Bay, Wisconsin
- Referee: Walt Anderson
- TV announcers (Fox): Joe Buck, Troy Aikman, & Pam Oliver

First quarter

- GB – 2:30 – 3 yd TD pass from Aaron Rodgers to Greg Jennings (Mason Crosby kick) (GB 7–0)

Second quarter

- CHI – 12:16 – Robbie Gould 35 yd FG (GB 7–3)
- GB – 1:15 – Ryan Grant 4 yd TD run (Crosby kick) (GB 14–3)
- GB – 0:20 – Mason Crosby 53 yd FG (GB 17–3)

Third quarter

- GB – 3:06 – 5 yd TD pass from Aaron Rodgers to Donald Lee (Crosby kick) (GB 24–3)

Fourth quarter

- GB – 9:54 – Mason Crosby 33 yd FG (GB 27–3)
- GB – 7:43 – Jason Hunter 54 yd fumble return TD (Crosby kick) (GB 34–3)
- GB – 2:00 – Mason Crosby 45 yd FG (GB 37–3)

	1	2	3	4	Total
Bears	0	3	0	0	3
Packers	7	10	7	13	37

Top passers

- CHI – Orton – 13/26, 133 yards, 0 TD – 0 INT
- GB – Rodgers – 23/30, 227 yards, 2 TD – 1 INT

Top rushers

- CHI – Forté – 16 carries, 64 yards, 0 TD
- GB – Grant – 25 carries, 145 yards, 1 TD

Top receivers

- CHI – Olsen – 4 receptions, 45 yards
- GB – Jennings – 5 receptions, 64 yards

Top tacklers

- CHI – Briggs – 8 tackles
- GB – Hawk – 6 tackles

=== Week 12: at St. Louis Rams ===
Hoping to rebound from their embarrassing divisional road loss to the Packers, the Bears flew to the Edward Jones Dome for a Week 12 duel with the St. Louis Rams. In the first quarter, Chicago drew first blood as rookie RB Matt Forté got a 13-yard TD run, while QB Kyle Orton completed a 7-yard TD pass to FB Jason McKie. In the second quarter, the Bears continued their domination as Forté got a 47-yard TD run. The Rams would respond as kicker Josh Brown got a 43-yard field goal. Chicago would close out the half with kicker Robbie Gould getting a 43-yard field goal. In the third quarter, the Bears pulled away as Gould nailed a 38-yard field goal. From there on out, Chicago's defense kept St. Louis in check.

With the win, the Bears improved to 6–5.

Week Twelve: Chicago Bears at St. Louis Rams— Game summary

- Game time: 1:00 PM EDT/12:00 PM CDT
- Game weather: None (Domed Stadium)
- TV announcers (Fox): Dick Stockton, Brian Baldinger, & Laura Okmin
- Game attendance: 61,994 at Edward Jones Dome, St. Louis, Missouri
- Referee: Terry McAulay

First quarter

- CHI – 13:10 – Matt Forté 13 yd TD run (Robbie Gould kick) (CHI 7–0)
- CHI – 1:48 – 7 yd TD pass from Kyle Orton to Jason McKie (Gould kick) (CHI 14–0)

Second quarter

- CHI – 9:31 – Matt Forté 47 yd TD run (Gould kick) (CHI 21–0)
- STL – 5:06 – Josh Brown 43 yd FG (CHI 21–3)
- CHI – 1:43 – Robbie Gould 43 yd FG (CHI 24–3)

Third quarter

- CHI – 5:17 – Robbie Gould 38 yd FG (CHI 27–3)

	1	2	3	4	Total
Bears	14	10	3	0	27
Rams	0	3	0	0	3

Top passers

- CHI – Orton – 18/29, 139 yards, 1 TD – 0 INT
- STL – Green – 16/30, 219 yards, 0 TD – 4 INT

Top rushers

- CHI – Forté – 20 carries, 132 yards, 2 TD
- STL – Darby – 7 carries, 10 yards

Top receivers

- CHI – Hester – 5 receptions, 57 yards
- STL – Holt – 4 receptions, 84 yards

Top tacklers

- CHI – Payne/Roach – 5 tackles
- STL – Witherspoon – 8 tackles

=== Week 13: at Minnesota Vikings ===
Coming off their easy road win over the Rams, the Bears flew to the Hubert H. Humphrey Metrodome for a Week 13 NFC North rematch with the Minnesota Vikings, with first place in the division on the line. In the first quarter, Chicago struck first as QB Kyle Orton completed a 65-yard TD pass to WR Devin Hester. In the second quarter, the Vikings responded with kicker Ryan Longwell getting a 23-yard field goal. After a Matt Forte 26-yd run got the Bears to the MIN 1, they failed on 4 attempts from the 1-yard line to get a TD. Subsequently, QB Gus Frerotte completed a 99-yard TD pass to former Bears WR Bernard Berrian on the next play, changing momentum in the Vikings favor with a 10-7 lead, and later got a 1-yard TD run for a 17-7 Vikings halftime lead.

In the third quarter, Chicago tried to rally as Orton completed a 2-yard TD pass to Forté, yet Minnesota answered with RB Chester Taylor getting a 21-yard TD run. In the fourth quarter, the Vikings pulled away as RB Adrian Peterson got a 1-yard TD run, while Longwell converted a 27-yard field goal.

With the loss, the Bears fell to 6–6.

Week Thirteen: Chicago Bears at Minnesota Vikings— Game summary

- Game time: 8:15 PM EDT/7:15 PM CDT
- Game weather: None (Domed Stadium)
- TV announcers (NBC): Al Michaels, John Madden, & Andrea Kremer
- Game attendance: 63,722 at Hubert H. Humphrey Metrodome, Minneapolis, Minnesota
- Referee: Bill Leavy

First quarter

- CHI – 8:04 – 65 yd TD pass from Kyle Orton to Devin Hester (Robbie Gould kick) (CHI 7–0)

Second quarter

- MIN – 12:45 – Ryan Longwell 23 yd FG (CHI 7–3)
- MIN – 4:48 – 99 yd TD pass from Gus Frerotte to Bernard Berrian (Longwell kick) (MIN 10–7)
- MIN – 0:48 – Gus Frerotte 1 yd TD run (Longwell kick) (MIN 17–7)

Third quarter

- CHI – 8:53 – 2 yd TD pass from Kyle Orton to Matt Forté (Gould kick) (MIN 17–14)
- MIN – 4:27 – Chester Taylor 21 yd TD run (Longwell kick) (MIN 24–14)

Fourth quarter

- MIN – 8:25 – Adrian Peterson 1 yd TD run (Longwell kick) (MIN 31–14)
- MIN – 4:18 – Ryan Longwell 27 yd FG) (MIN 34–14)

	1	2	3	4	Total
Bears	7	0	7	0	14
Vikings	0	17	7	10	34

Top passers

- CHI – Orton – 11/29, 139 yards, 2 TD – 3 INT
- MIN – Frerotte – 16/25, 210 yards, 1 TD – 1 INT

Top rushers

- CHI – Forté – 22 carries, 96 yards, 0 TD
- MIN – Peterson – 28 carries, 131 yards, 1 TD

Top receivers

- CHI – Hester – 3 receptions, 67 yards, 1 TD
- MIN – Berrian – 4 receptions, 122 yards, 1 TD

Top tacklers

- CHI – Graham/Urlacher – 6 tackles
- MIN – M. Williams – 8 tackles

=== Week 14: vs. Jacksonville Jaguars ===
With a divisional road loss to the Vikings behind them, the Bears went home for a Week 14 interconference duel with the Jacksonville Jaguars. Chicago got off to a fast start in the first quarter as QB Kyle Orton completed a 2-yard TD pass to TE Desmond Clark. The Jaguars would respond with kicker Josh Scobee getting a 46-yard field goal, yet kicker Robbie Gould replied by giving the Bears a 22-yard field goal. Chicago would greatly increase their lead in the second quarter as Gould got a 36-yard field goal, along with Orton completing a 22-yard TD pass to TE Greg Olsen. After a scoreless third quarter, Jacksonville tried to come back in the fourth quarter, as QB David Garrard completed a 4-yard TD pass to RB Maurice Jones-Drew. Afterwards, after Gould nailed a 35-yard field goal, the Bears defense stiffened for the rest of the game.

With the win, Chicago improved to 7–6.

Rookie RB Matt Forté (21 carries for 69 yards and 5 catches for 37 yards) would surpass Gale Sayers for the most rookie scrimmage yards in franchise history with 1,476 yards.

Week Fourteen: Jacksonville Jaguars vs. Chicago Bears— Game summary

- Game time: 1:00 PM EDT/12:00 PM CDT
- Game weather: 19 °F (−7 °C) (Mostly Cloudy)
- TV announcers (CBS): Greg Gumbel & Dan Dierdorf
- Game attendance: at Soldier Field, Chicago
- Referee: Bill Carollo

First quarter

- CHI – 12:36 – 2 yd TD pass from Kyle Orton to Desmond Clark (Robbie Gould kick) (CHI 7–0)
- JAC – 6:28 – Josh Scobee 42 yd FG (CHI 7–3)
- CHI – 0:19 – Gould 22 yd FG (CHI 10–3)

Second quarter

- CHI – 2:44 – Gould 36 yd FG (CHI 13–3)
- CHI – 0:18 – 22 yd TD pass from Orton to Greg Olsen (Gould kick) (CHI 20–3)

Fourth quarter

- JAC – 12:09 – 4 yd TD pass from David Garrard to Maurice Jones-Drew (Scobee kick) (CHI 20–10)
- CHI – 8:58 – Gould 35 yd FG (CHI 23–10)

	1	2	3	4	Total
Jaguars	3	0	0	7	10
Bears	10	10	0	3	23

Top passers

- JAC – David Garrard – 19/38 for 178 yards, 1 TD, 1 INT
- CHI – Kyle Orton – 20/34 for 219 yards, 2 TDs, 1 INT

Top rushers

- JAC – Maurice Jones-Drew – 12 carries, 55 yards
- CHI – Matt Forté- 21 carries, 69 yards

Top receivers

- JAC – Maurice Jones-Drew – 7 receptions, 47 yards, 1 TD
- CHI – Devin Hester – 5 receptions, 80 yards

Top tacklers

- JAC – Brian Williams (8)
- CHI – Anthony Adams, Mike Brown, Charles Tillman (6)

=== Week 15: vs. New Orleans Saints ===
Fresh off their win over the Jaguars, the Bears stayed at home for a Week 15 Thursday night battle with the New Orleans Saints. Chicago immediately got the lead as free safety Danieal Manning returned the game's opening kickoff 83 yards for a touchdown. The Saints would respond in the second quarter with quarterback Drew Brees completing a 2-yard touchdown pass to running back Pierre Thomas, yet the Bears answered with rookie running back Matt Forté getting a 1-yard touchdown run, while quarterback Kyle Orton got a 6-yard touchdown run.

New Orleans would begin to rally in the third quarter as Thomas got a 42-yard touchdown run. In the fourth quarter, the Sains took the lead as kicker Garrett Hartley made a 30-yard field goal, along with Brees completing an 11-yard touchdown pass to wide receiver Marques Colston. Afterwards, Chicago replied with a game-tying 28-yard field goal from kicker Robbie Gould. In overtime, the Bears clinched the victory as Gould nailed the game-winning 35-yard field goal.

With the win, Chicago kept its playoff hopes alive by improving to 8–6. This would the Bears last win over the Saints until 2025.

Week Fifteen: New Orleans Saints vs. Chicago Bears— Game summary

- Game time: 8:15 PM EDT/7:15 PM CDT
- Game weather: 28 °F (−2 °C) (Partly Cloudy)
- TV announcers (NFLN): Bob Papa & Cris Collinsworth
- Game attendance: 61,692 at Soldier Field, Chicago
- Referee: Mike Carey

First quarter

- CHI – 14:48 – Danieal Manning 83 yd kickoff return TD (Robbie Gould kick) (CHI 7–0)

Second quarter

- NO – 9:52 – 2 yd TD pass from Drew Brees to Pierre Thomas (Garrett Hartley kick) (7–7)
- CHI – 7:42 – Matt Forté 1 yd TD run (Gould kick) (CHI 14–7)
- CHI – 0:49 – Kyle Orton 6 yd TD run (Gould kick) (CHI 21–7)

Third quarter

- NO – 3:44 – Thomas 42 yd TD run (Hartley kick) (CHI 21–14)

Fourth quarter

- NO – 9:07 – Hartley 30 yd FG (CHI 21–17)
- NO – 3:05 – 11 yd TD pass from Brees to Marques Colston (Hartley kick) (NO 24-21)
- CHI – 0:00 – Gould 28 yd FG (24–24)

Overtime

- CHI – 12:14 – Gould 35 yd FG (CHI 27–24)

	1	2	3	4	OT	Total
Saints	0	7	7	10	0	24
Bears	7	14	0	3	3	27

Top passers

- NO – Drew Brees – 24/43 for 232 yards, 2 TDs, 2 INTs
- CHI – Kyle Orton – 24/40 for 172 yards, 2 INTs

Top rushers

- NO – Pierre Thomas – 22 carries, 87 yards, 1 TD
- CHI – Matt Forté- 11 carries, 34 yards, 1 TD

Top receivers

- NO – Marques Colston – 6 receptions, 84 yards, 1 TD
- CHI – Devin Hester – 4 receptions, 46 yards

Top tacklers

- NO – Scott Fujita (7)
- CHI – Lance Briggs, Brian Urlacher (7)

=== Week 16: vs. Green Bay Packers ===
Coming off their overtime win over the Saints, the Bears stayed at home for a Week 16 NFC North rematch with their hated rival, the Green Bay Packers. After a scoreless first quarter, Chicago would trail in the second quarter as Packers quarterback Aaron Rodgers completed a 7-yard touchdown pass to wide receiver Greg Jennings. The Bears would respond with a 31-yard field goal from kicker Robbie Gould. Green Bay would end the half with Rodgers completing a 17-yard touchdown to running back Ryan Grant.

In the third quarter, Chicago would begin to rally as quarterback Kyle Orton completed a 3-yard touchdown pass to tight end Greg Olsen. The Packers would answer in the fourth quarter with kicker Mason Crosby making a 28-yard field goal. The Bears would reply with rookie running back Matt Forté getting a 3-yard touchdown run. After defensive end Alex Brown blocked a Crosby field goal attempt to force overtime, Chicago would seal the victory as Gould nailed the game-winning 38-yard field goal.

With the win, the Bears kept their playoff hopes alive at 9–6.

Week Sixteen: Green Bay Packers vs. Chicago Bears— Game summary

- Game time: 8:30 PM EDT/7:30 PM CDT
- Game weather: 2 °F (−17 °C) (Cloudy)
- TV announcers (ESPN): Mike Tirico, Ron Jaworski, Tony Kornheiser, Michele Tafoya, & Suzy Kolber
- Game attendance: 62,151 at Soldier Field, Chicago
- Referee: Ron Winter

Second quarter

- GB – 6:21 – 7 yd TD pass from Aaron Rodgers to Greg Jennings (Mason Crosby kick) (GB 7–0)
- CHI – 4:06 – Gould 31 yd FG (GB 7–3)
- GB – 1:04 – 17 yd TD pass from Aaron Rodgers to Ryan Grant (Crosby kick) (GB 14–3)

Third quarter

- CHI – 10:59 – 3 yd TD pass from Kyle Orton to Greg Olsen (Gould kick) (GB 14–10)

Fourth quarter

- GB – 13:02 – Crosby 28 yd FG (GB 17–10)
- CHI – 3:11 – Matt Forté 3 yd TD run (Gould kick) (17–17)

Overtime

- CHI – 11:28 – Gould 38 yd FG (CHI 20–17)

	1	2	3	4	OT	Total
Packers	0	14	0	3	0	17
Bears	0	3	7	7	3	20

Top passers

- GB – Aaron Rodgers – 24/39 for 260 yards, 2 TDs, 1 INT
- CHI – Kyle Orton – 14/27 for 142 yards, 1 TD, 2 INTs

Top rushers

- GB – Ryan Grant – 25 carries, 61 yards
- CHI – Matt Forté - 23 carries, 73 yards, 1 TD

Top receivers

- GB – Donald Driver – 6 receptions, 63 yards
- CHI – Greg Olsen – 5 receptions, 49 yards, 1 TD

Top tacklers

- GB – Brandon Chillar (7)
- CHI – Corey Graham (9)

=== Week 17: at Houston Texans ===
Needing a win to stay alive in the playoff picture, the Bears flew to Reliant Stadium for a crucial Week 17 interconference battle with the Houston Texans. Chicago got off to a fast first-quarter start as quarterback Kyle Orton completed a 4-yard touchdown pass to wide receiver Brandon Lloyd, followed by kicker Robbie Gould's 37-yard field goal. The Texans responded in the second quarter with quarterback Matt Schaub completing a 43-yard and a 3-yard touchdown pass to wide receiver Andre Johnson.

In the third quarter, Houston added to their lead as running back Ryan Moats got a 2-yard touchdown run. The Bears tried to rally as Orton completed a 1-yard touchdown pass to tight end Greg Olsen. However, in the fourth quarter, the Texans struck back as kicker Kris Brown nailed a 22-yard field goal, followed by running back Steve Slaton's 2-yard touchdown run. Chicago tried to come back as Orton got a 1-yard touchdown run, but Houston's defense stopped any other attempt.

With the loss, in addition to the Vikings' win over the Giants, the Bears' season ended at 9–7.

Week Seventeen: Chicago Bears vs. Houston Texans— Game summary

- Game time: 1:00 PM EDT/12:00 PM CDT
- Game weather: 46 °F (8 °C) (Cloudy)
- TV announcers (Fox): Matt Vasgersian, J. C. Pearson, & Nischelle Turner
- Game attendance: 70,838 at Reliant Stadium, Houston, Texas
- Referee: Carl Cheffers

First quarter

- CHI – 5:57 – 4 yd TD pass from Kyle Orton to Brandon Lloyd (Gould kick) (CHI 7–0)
- CHI – 3:30 – Gould 37 yd FG (CHI 10–0)

Second quarter

- HOU – 5:50 – 43 yd TD pass from Matt Schaub to Andre Johnson (Brown kick) (CHI 10–7)
- HOU – 1:54 – 3 yd TD pass from Matt Schaub to Andre Johnson (Brown kick) (HOU 14–10)

Third quarter

- HOU – 8:30 – Ryan Moats 2 yd TD run (Brown kick) (HOU 21–10)
- CHI – 10:59 – 1 yd TD pass from Kyle Orton to Greg Olsen (Gould kick) (HOU 21–17)

Fourth quarter

- HOU – 11:55 – Brown 37 yd FG (HOU 24–17)
- HOU – 3:24 – Slaton 2 yd TD run (Brown kick) (HOU 31–17)
- CHI – 1:31 – Orton 1 yd TD run (Gould kick) (HOU 31–24)

	1	2	3	4	Total
Bears	10	0	7	7	24
Texans	0	14	7	10	31

Top passers

- CHI – Kyle Orton – 22/37, 244 yards, 2 TDs
- HOU – Matt Schaub – 27/36, 328 yards, 2 TDs

Top rushers

- CHI – Matt Forté – 13 carries, 50 yards
- HOU – Steve Slaton – 20 carries, 92 yards, 1 TD

Top receivers

- CHI – Devin Hester – 6 receptions, 85 yards
- HOU – Andre Johnson – 10 receptions, 148 yards, 2 TDs

Top tacklers

- CHI – Charles Tillman (9)
- HOU – DeMeco Ryans (8)

== Player stats ==
Updated as of January 23, 2009

=== Offense ===
Passing Statistics
Player	Att	Comp	Yds	Comp %	Yds/Att	TD	TD %	INT	INT %	Long	Sck	Sack/Lost	Rating
Kyle Orton	465	272	2972	58.5	6.4	18	3.9	12	2.6	65	27	160	79.6
Rex Grossman	62	32	257	51.6	4.1	2	3.2	2	3.2	29	2	8	59.7
Brad Maynard	1	0	0	0.0	0.0	0	0.0	0	0.0	–	0	0	39.6
Total	528	304	3229	57.6	6.1	20	3.8	14	2.7	65	29	168	77.1

Rushing Statistics
Player	Att	Yards	RushAvg	Long	TD
Matt Forte	316	1238	3.9	50	8
Kevin Jones	34	109	3.2	16	0
Kyle Orton	24	49	2.0	12	3
Adrian Peterson	20	100	5.0	16	0
Garrett Wolfe	15	69	4.6	38	0
Jason McKie	11	26	2.4	6	2
Devin Hester	6	61	10.2	20	0
Rashied Davis	3	14	4.7	17	0
Rex Grossman	3	4	1.3	2	2
Marty Booker	1	3	3.0	3	0
Jason Davis	1	0	0.0	0	0
Total	434	1673	3.9	50	15

Receiving Statistics
Player	Rec	Yards	RecAvg	Long	TD
Matt Forte	63	477	7.6	19	4
Greg Olsen	54	574	10.6	52	5
Devin Hester	51	665	13.0	65	3
Desmond Clark	41	367	9.0	35	1
Rashied Davis	35	445	12.7	36	2
Brandon Lloyd	26	364	14.0	32	2
Marty Booker	14	211	15.1	51	2
Jason McKie	11	64	5.8	12	1
Kevin Jones	2	5	2.5	3	0
Jason Davis	1	12	12.0	12	0
Total	298	3229	10.8	65	20

=== Defense ===
Defense
Player	GP	Tackles	Sacks	INTs	FF	FR	Def TD
Lance Briggs	16	110	0.5	3	1	1	1
Charles Tillman	15	93	0.0	3	n/a	n/a	1
Total							

=== Special teams ===
Kicking
Player	GP	FGM	FGA	FG %	XPM	XPA	XP %	Lng
Robbie Gould	16	26	29	89.7	41	41	100.0	48
Total	16	26	29	89.7	41	41	100.0	48

Punting
Player	GP	Punts	Yards	LNG	Blocked	TB	Net	Avg
Brad Maynard	16	53	n/a	67	0	n/a	n/a	40.6
Total	9	96	n/a	67	0	5	n/a	41.2

Kick Return
Player	GP	Ret	Yards	Avg	FC	TD	LNG
Danieal Manning	16	36	1070	29.7	1	1	83
Devin Hester	15	31	679	21.9	n/a	0	51
Garrett Wolfe	13	5	98	19.6	n/a	0	33
Total							

Punt Return
Player	GP	Ret	Yards	Avg	TD	LNG
Total						
