= Greg Olsen (American football) =

American football player and sportscaster (born 1985)

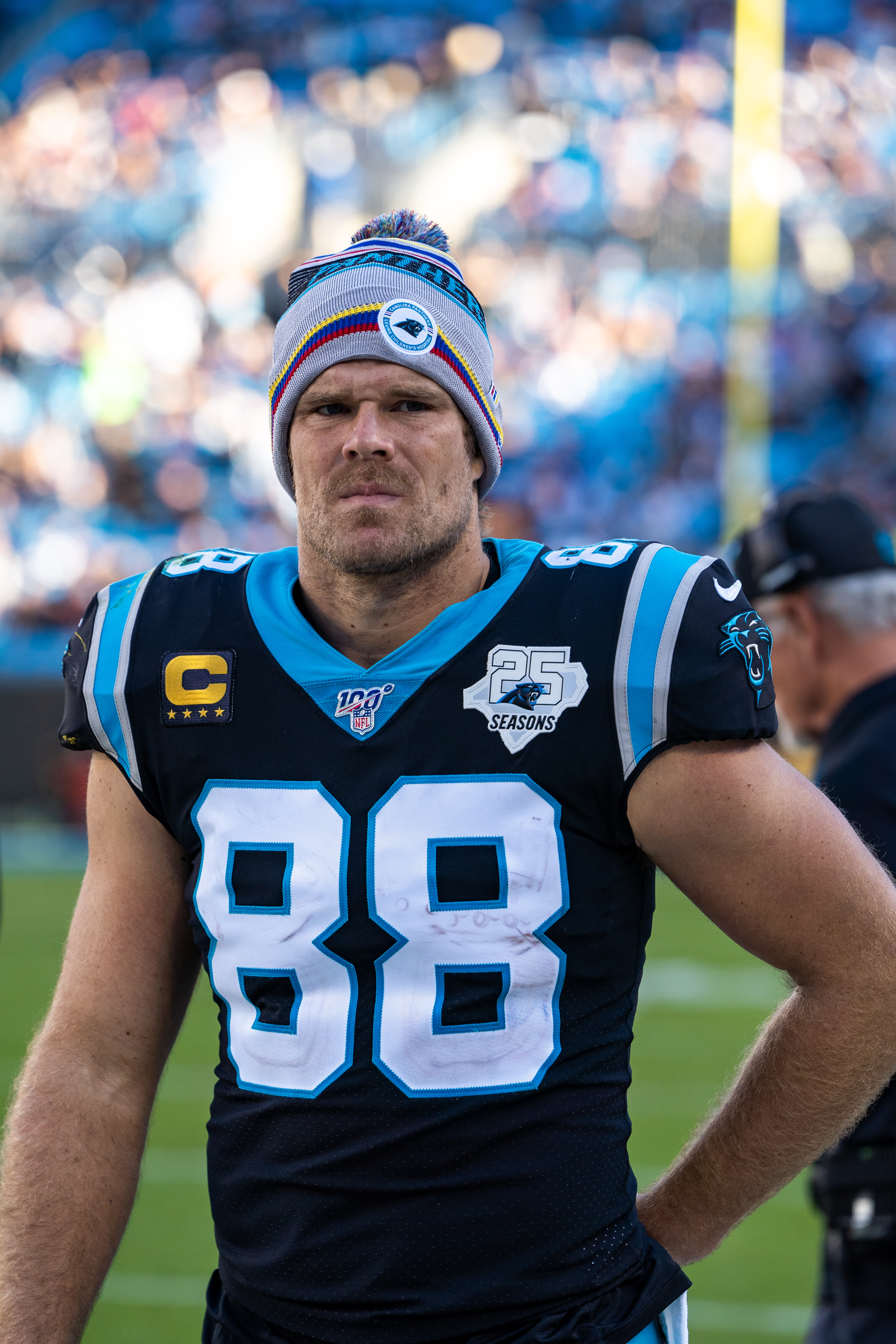
- Olsen with the Carolina Panthers in 2019

No. 82, 88
- Position: Tight end

Personal information
- Born: March 11, 1985 (age 41); Paterson, New Jersey, U.S.
- Listed height: 6 ft 6 in (1.98 m)
- Listed weight: 255 lb (116 kg)

Career information
- High school: Wayne Hills (Wayne, New Jersey)
- College: Miami (FL) (2003–2006)
- NFL draft: 2007: 1st round, 31st overall pick

Career history
- Chicago Bears (2007–2010); Carolina Panthers (2011–2019); Seattle Seahawks (2020)

Awards and highlights
- 2× Second-team All-Pro (2015, 2016); 3× Pro Bowl (2014–2016); PFWA All-Rookie Team (2007); First-team All-ACC (2006)

Career NFL statistics
- Receptions: 742
- Receiving yards: 8,683
- Receiving touchdowns: 60
- Stats at Pro Football Reference

Gregory Walter Olsen Jr. (born March 11, 1985) is an American professional football sportscaster and former tight end who played for 14 seasons in the National Football League (NFL). He played college football for the Miami Hurricanes and was selected by the Chicago Bears in the first round of the 2007 NFL draft. Olsen played most of his career for the Carolina Panthers, with whom he made three Pro Bowls, and became the first tight end in NFL history to record three consecutive seasons with at least 1,000 receiving yards. Olsen played his final season with the Seattle Seahawks in 2020. Following his retirement Olsen joined Fox as a sportscaster and is formerly the lead color commentator for the NFL on Fox.

== Early life ==
Olsen grew up in Wayne, New Jersey, and attended Wayne Hills High School, where he played football and basketball under his father, Chris Olsen Sr. As a high school senior he was one of three finalists for the Gatorade Player of the Year award, along with former Miami Hurricane teammate Kyle Wright. He was a USA Today first-team All-American as a senior in 2002. He finished his career with 73 receptions for 1,474 yards, and a school-record 27 touchdowns. He played in the 2003 U.S. Army All-American Bowl.

Considered a five-star recruit by Rivals.com, Olsen was listed as the No. 2 tight end in the nation in 2003, and the No. 2 prospect in New Jersey behind Nate Robinson.

In track and field, Olsen competed in the throwing events and as a sprinter. He recorded a personal-best time of 11.40 seconds in the 100 meters. He placed 2nd in the shot put event at the 2003 NJSIAA Meet of Champions, recording a career-best throw of 18.03 meters. He also had top-throws of 46.63 meters in the discus throw and 59.83 meters in the javelin throw.

== College career ==
Olsen originally enrolled at the University of Notre Dame, but transferred as a freshman to the University of Miami in 2003. In 2003, he was on the Hurricanes' scout team before suffering a shoulder injury and being redshirted. He became the starter of the Miami Hurricanes in his sophomore season in 2005 after Kevin Everett was drafted in the third round by the Buffalo Bills. In his career, he totaled 87 receptions for 1,215 yards and six touchdowns.

In 2003, Olsen was one of the players who participated in the University of Miami's rap group, the 7th Floor Crew, under the pseudonym Third Leg Greg. Many media sources ridiculed him for his involvement in the group, which earned national notoriety for their sexually explicit and vulgar lyrics.

== Professional career ==
Pre-draft measurables
Height	Weight	Arm length	Hand span	40-yard dash	10-yard split	20-yard split	20-yard shuttle	Three-cone drill	Vertical jump	Broad jump	Bench press
6 ft 5 7/8 in (1.98 m)	254 lb (115 kg)	32 1/2 in (0.83 m)	10 1/2 in (0.27 m)	4.51 s	1.62 s	2.66 s	4.48 s	7.04 s	35 1/2 in (0.90 m)	9 ft 6 in (2.90 m)	23 reps
All values from NFL Combine.

=== Chicago Bears ===
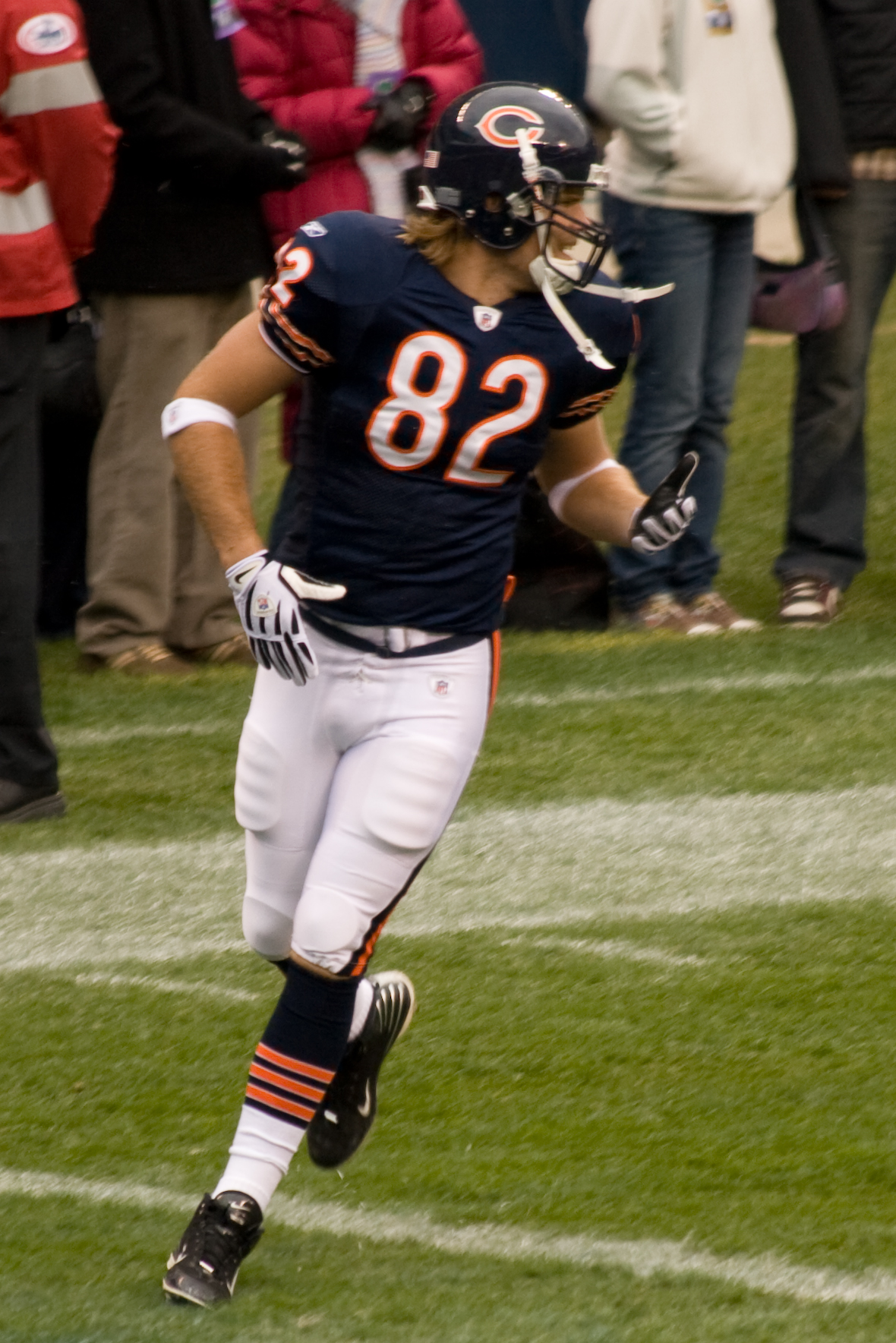
Olsen with the Chicago Bears in 2008

The Chicago Bears selected Olsen in the first round as the 31st overall pick in the 2007 NFL draft. He signed a five-year contract with the team on July 3, which made him the first player of the draft's top 64 selections to come to terms with their team. He sustained a knee injury during the Bears' final preseason game in 2007, and consequently, he missed the team's first two games while recovering. He made his NFL debut on September 23, 2007, against the Dallas Cowboys, catching two passes for twenty-eight yards. Olsen caught his first touchdown two weeks later during a Week 5 match-up against the Green Bay Packers. Olsen finished the season with 39 receptions for 391 yards and two touchdowns.

Olsen saw his playing time increase during his second season. He started 7 of 16 games, making 54 receptions for 574 yards and five touchdowns. He led the team in receiving touchdowns, while finishing second in receptions and receiving yards. Olsen was selected as a second alternate for the 2009 Pro Bowl. Chicago's Comcast SportsNet named Olsen the Bears Player of the Year.

In 2009, Olsen quickly developed a rapport with Jay Cutler, whom the Bears had acquired from the Denver Broncos. Olsen and Cutler connected for 60 receptions, for 612 yards, and eight touchdowns. He led the Bears in receptions and touchdowns, while finishing behind Devin Hester for most receiving yards. Before the 2010 season the Bears fired Ron Turner and hired Mike Martz as offensive coordinator. His numbers dropped compared to his 2008 and 2009 seasons, as he recorded 41 receptions for 404 yards, and five touchdowns. However, Olsen helped the Bears win their first 2011 playoff game against the Seattle Seahawks, catching three passes for 113 yards and two touchdowns.

=== Carolina Panthers ===
On July 28, 2011, Olsen was traded to the Carolina Panthers for a 2012 third-round draft pick.

==== 2011 season ====
During his first year with the Carolina Panthers, Olsen recorded 45 receptions for 540 yards and five touchdowns.

==== 2012 season ====
In Week 10 of the 2012 season, against the Denver Broncos, Olsen recorded nine receptions for 102 yards and two touchdowns in the 36–14 loss. In the 2012 season, he recorded 69 receptions for 843 receiving yards and five receiving touchdowns.

==== 2013 season ====
In the 2013 season, Olsen recorded 73 receptions for 816 receiving yards and six receiving touchdowns as the Panthers finished with a 12–4 record.

==== 2014 season ====
Olsen finished the 2014 regular season with a career-high 84 catches, 1,008 receiving yards, as well as six touchdowns en route to the Panthers second consecutive NFC South division title. He had three games going over 100 receiving yards and one game with two touchdowns on the year. Olsen finished third in the NFL for receptions by a tight end and second for both yards on the season and yards per game.

For his efforts during the 2014–15 season, he was voted to the 2015 Pro Bowl.

He was ranked 89th by his fellow players on the NFL Top 100 Players of 2015.

==== 2015 season ====
On March 5, 2015, the Panthers signed Olsen to a three-year extension worth $22.5 million. The extension included a $12 million signing bonus with an average annual salary of $7.5 million, according to Olsen's agent Drew Rosenhaus.

After wide receiver Kelvin Benjamin suffered an ACL tear and did not play for the entire year, Olsen was tasked with being the main target of soon-to-be NFL MVP Cam Newton.

In Week 3 against the New Orleans Saints, Olsen caught eight passes including two touchdowns and a career-high 134 receiving yards. He tied a career long reception of 52 yards. In Week 6, he continued his high level of play against the Seattle Seahawks. Olsen caught seven catches for 131 yards along with a game-winning touchdown with under a minute to play. The touchdown helped keep the Panthers undefeated season alive as they improved to 5–0 on the season. During the Panthers' 41–38 victory over the New Orleans Saints to improve them to 12–0, he caught nine passes for 129 yards and, during the game, passed Walls for most career receptions by a TE in Panthers' history.

In the 2015 season, Olsen set Panthers records for career receiving yards and receptions for a tight end, both previously held by former Panther Wesley Walls. Olsen finished with 77 receptions with 1,104 yards and seven touchdowns. He was selected for his second consecutive Pro Bowl and to the AP All-Pro second-team. He was ranked 38th on the NFL Top 100 Players of 2016.

In the NFC Divisional Round, Olsen had six receptions for 77 yards and a touchdown to help the Panthers to a 31–24 win over the Seattle Seahawks and an NFC Championship matchup with the Arizona Cardinals. He caught six passes for 113 yards against the Cardinals to help the Panthers in their 49–15 win and a Super Bowl 50 berth against the Denver Broncos.

In Super Bowl 50, he had four catches for 41 yards, but the Panthers lost 24–10.

==== 2016 season ====
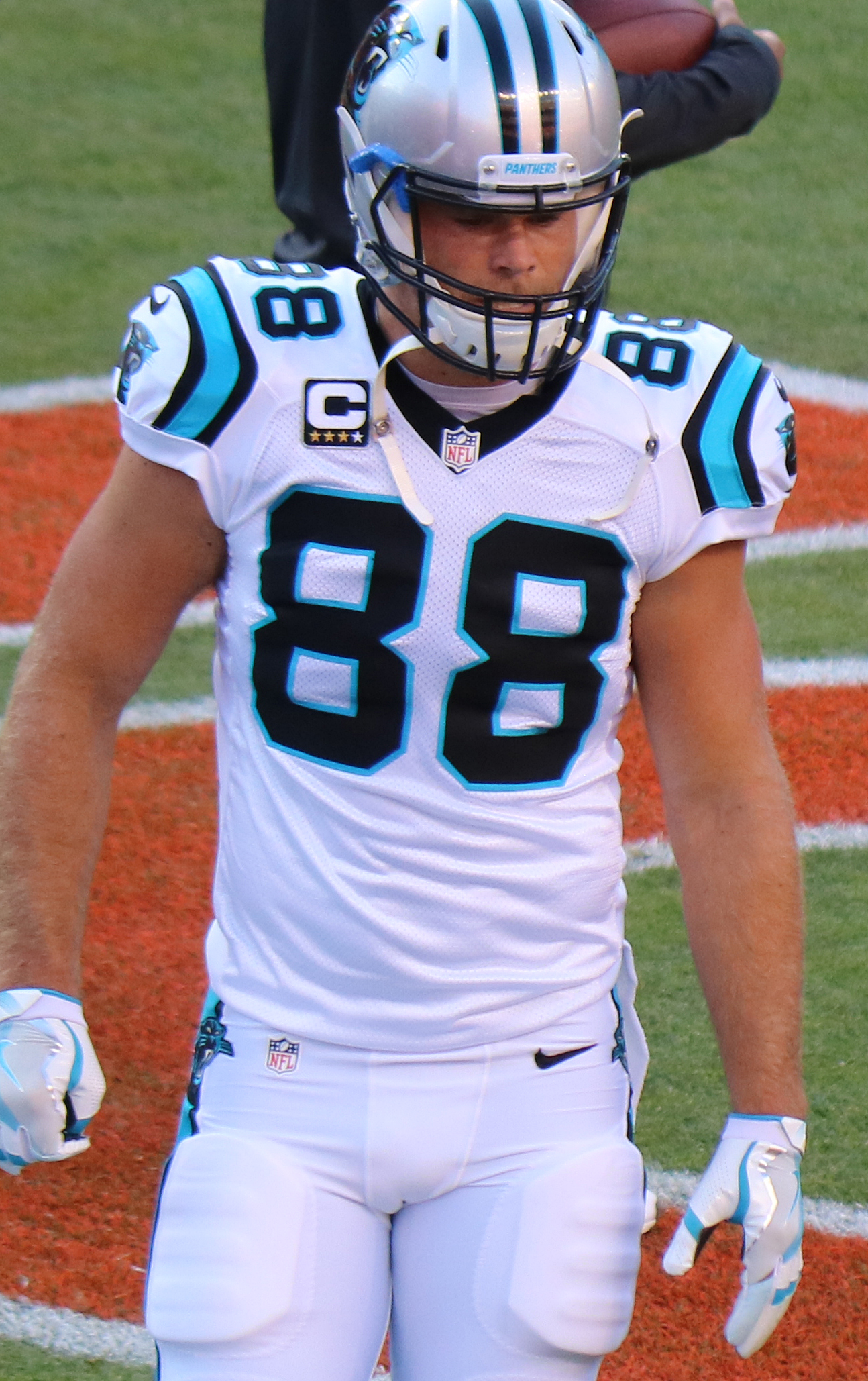
Olsen with the Carolina Panthers in 2016

In 2016, the Panthers failed to return to the playoffs following their Super Bowl 50 appearance, but Olsen still had a productive season.

In Week 2, against the San Francisco 49ers, he had five receptions for 122 receiving yards and a touchdown in the 46–27 victory. In Week 5, against the Tampa Bay Buccaneers, he had nine receptions for 181 receiving yards in the 17–14 loss.

In Week 16 against the Atlanta Falcons, with a 17-yard catch in the second quarter, Olsen set an NFL record, becoming the first tight end in NFL history to record three consecutive 1,000-yard receiving seasons.

He finished the 2016 season with 80 receptions for 1,073 yards and three touchdowns. He was named to his third consecutive Pro Bowl. He was also ranked 67th by his peers on the NFL Top 100 Players of 2017.

==== 2017 season ====
In Week 2 against the Buffalo Bills, Olsen left the game with a foot injury. Olsen later confessed that his foot was broken, which was positive after an X-ray test. It required surgery, causing him to miss 6–8 weeks. He was placed on injured reserve on September 19, 2017.

On November 19, Olsen served as a guest analyst on FOX Sports, calling a matchup between the Vikings and the Rams. On November 24, 2017, Olsen was activated off injured reserve to the active roster. He played the next game against the New York Jets, aggravated his surgically repaired foot, and was taken out of the game.

==== 2018 season ====
On April 26, 2018, Olsen signed a two-year extension with the Panthers worth $17.1 million with a potential maximum of $20.1 million.

In the season opener against the Dallas Cowboys, Olsen left the game in the second quarter with a foot injury. It was confirmed that he had re-fractured his right foot and would be sidelined indefinitely.

On December 2, Olsen ruptured his plantar fascia in the second quarter during a 24–17 loss to the Tampa Bay Buccaneers. He was placed on season-ending injured reserve on December 5, 2018. He finished the 2018 season with 27 receptions for 291 receiving yards and four receiving touchdowns in nine games.

==== 2019 season ====
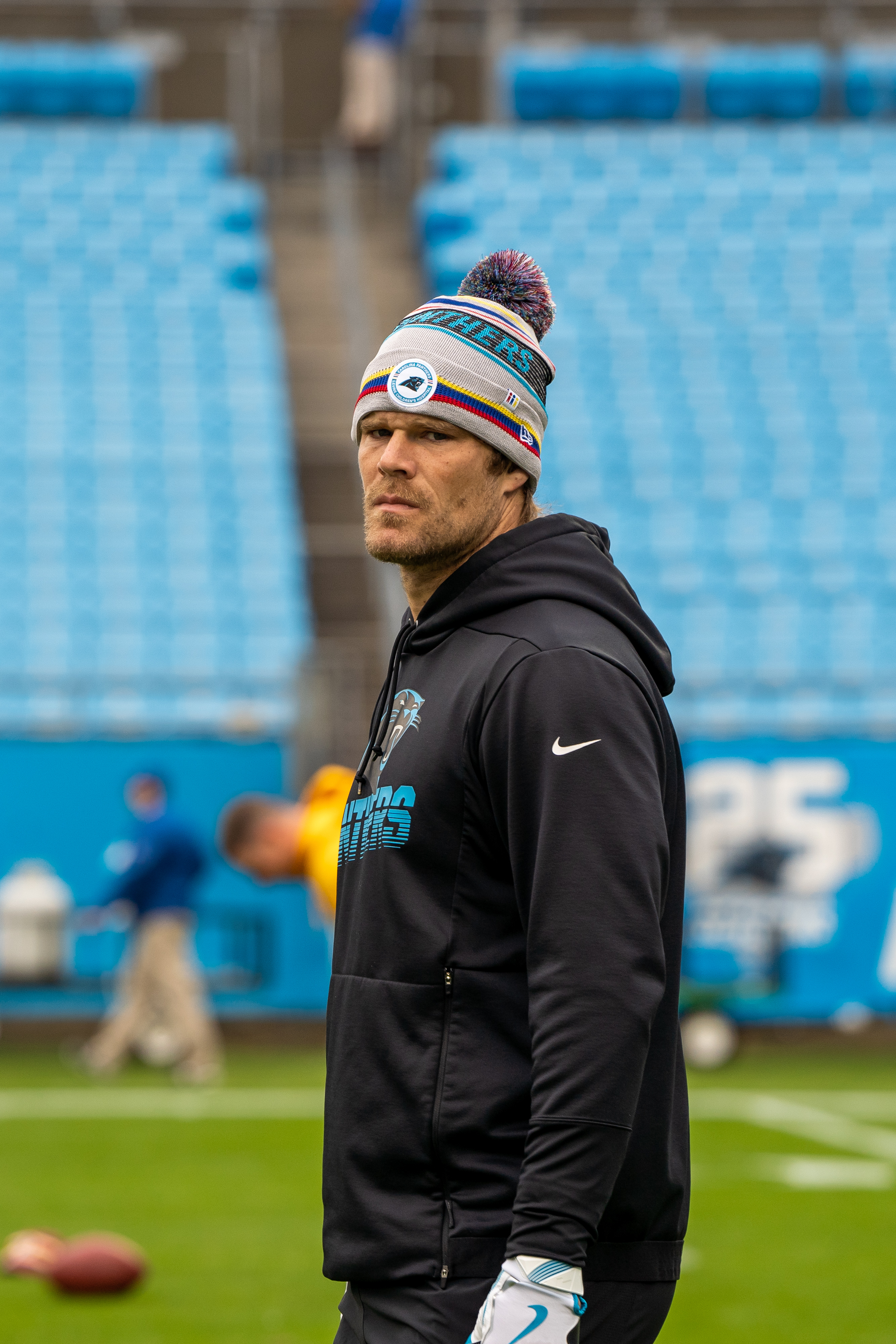
Olsen with the Carolina Panthers in 2019

In Week 2 against the Tampa Bay Buccaneers, Olsen caught six passes for 110 yards as the Panthers lost 20–14. In Week 3 against the Arizona Cardinals, Olsen caught six passes for 75 yards and two touchdowns as the Panthers won 38–20. Overall, Olsen finished the season with 52 receptions for 597 yards and two receiving touchdowns.

On February 3, 2020, the Panthers released Olsen after nine seasons.

=== Seattle Seahawks ===
On February 18, 2020, Olsen signed a one-year, $7 million contract with the Seattle Seahawks.

Olsen made his debut with the Seahawks in Week 1 against the Atlanta Falcons and caught four passes for 24 receiving yards and a receiving touchdown during the 38–25 victory.

In Week 11, he suffered a plantar fascia tear and was placed on injured reserve on November 23, 2020. On December 26, 2020, Olsen was activated off of injured reserve.

He finished the 2020 season with 24 receptions for 239 receiving yards and one receiving touchdown.

He was released by the Seahawks on March 4, 2021.

=== Retirement ===
On January 24, 2021, Olsen announced his retirement and that he would be joining Fox Sports as a full-time broadcaster. Olsen signed a one-day contract with the Carolina Panthers on March 11, 2021, that allowed him to retire as a member of the team.

== NFL career statistics ==
Legend
**Bold**	Career high

=== Regular season ===
Year	Team	Games		Receiving					Fumbles	
Year	Team	GP	GS	Rec	Yds	Avg	Lng	TD	Fum	Lost
2007	CHI	14	4	39	391	10.0	31	2	0	0
2008	CHI	16	7	54	574	10.6	52	5	**2**	**2**
2009	CHI	16	15	60	612	10.2	41	**8**	0	0
2010	CHI	16	13	41	404	9.9	39	5	**2**	1
2011	CAR	16	13	45	540	12.0	44	5	1	1
2012	CAR	16	16	69	843	12.2	47	5	0	0
2013	CAR	16	16	73	816	11.2	31	5	0	0
2014	CAR	16	16	**84**	1,008	12.0	38	6	1	0
2015	CAR	16	16	77	**1,104**	**14.3**	52	7	1	1
2016	CAR	16	16	80	1,073	13.4	**78**	3	0	0
2017	CAR	7	7	17	191	11.2	30	1	0	0
2018	CAR	9	9	27	291	10.8	23	4	0	0
2019	CAR	16	16	52	597	11.5	41	2	0	0
2020	SEA	11	8	24	239	10.0	22	1	0	0
Total		199	170	742	8,683	11.7	78	60	7	5

=== Postseason ===
Year	Team	Games		Receiving					Fumbles	
Year	Team	GP	GS	Rec	Yds	Avg	Lng	TD	Fum	Lost
2010	CHI	2	2	6	143	**23.8**	**58**	**1**	0	0
2013	CAR	1	1	4	55	13.8	35	0	0	0
2014	CAR	2	2	7	95	13.6	31	0	0	0
2015	CAR	3	3	**16**	**231**	14.4	54	**1**	0	0
2017	CAR	1	1	8	107	13.4	24	**1**	0	0
2020	SEA	1	0	0	0	0.0	0	0	0	0
Total		10	9	41	629	15.3	58	3	0	0

== In media ==
=== Sportscasting ===
Olsen is a color commentator for NFL games on Fox Sports. He began doing color commentary during bye weeks towards the end of his playing career and went full time in the profession in 2021, working with Kevin Burkhardt.

After Olsen's first full-time year at Fox, the pair were promoted to the #1 team just before the 2022 season, replacing Joe Buck and Troy Aikman, who left Fox to join ESPN and call Monday Night Football. The duo called Fox's Super Bowl LVII broadcast. Olsen is now part of Fox's second team with play-by-play announcer Joe Davis for the 2024 NFL season, after Tom Brady joined Fox Sports. Olsen makes weekly appearances, in a segment with Jon Gruden, every Monday during the football season on Wake Up Barstool. He garnered slight controversy when he had some friendly banter with Dave Portnoy over Olsen's attire, which some fans did not realize was a friendly interaction.

=== Podcast network and production company ===
In March 2022, Olsen, along with Vince Vaughn and Ryan Kalil, launched a podcast network and production company named Audiorama. The first podcast available from the network, called Youth, Inc., focuses on youth sports.

== Personal life ==
Olsen's older brother, Chris Olsen Jr., played quarterback for the University of Virginia in Charlottesville, Virginia. His younger brother, Kevin, was recruited to Greg's alma mater, Miami. Greg announced his brother Chris Jr.'s death in February 2026 from cancer.

Olsen founded Receptions For Research: The Greg Olsen Foundation in 2009, which helps fund cancer research. His mother Sue is a cancer survivor and inspired the creation of his foundation. One of his fundraising events includes Kicks for a Cure Kickball Tournament, the world's largest charity kickball tournament. The large-scale event is held annually each summer in Chicago's Grant Park. Over 1,000 people compete on kickball teams and have fun while raising money for cancer research.

Olsen's first child was born in early June 2011. In 2012 he and his wife, Kara, became parents of twins; one was born with hypoplastic left heart syndrome and on June 4, 2021, received a successful heart transplant. Olsen is Catholic.

Preceded by Troy Aikman	Lead color commentator, The NFL on Fox; 2022–2023	Succeeded by Tom Brady
Preceded by Troy Aikman	Super Bowl television color commentator (NFC package carrier); 2023	Succeeded by Tom Brady
