= Zack Bowman =

American football player (born 1984)

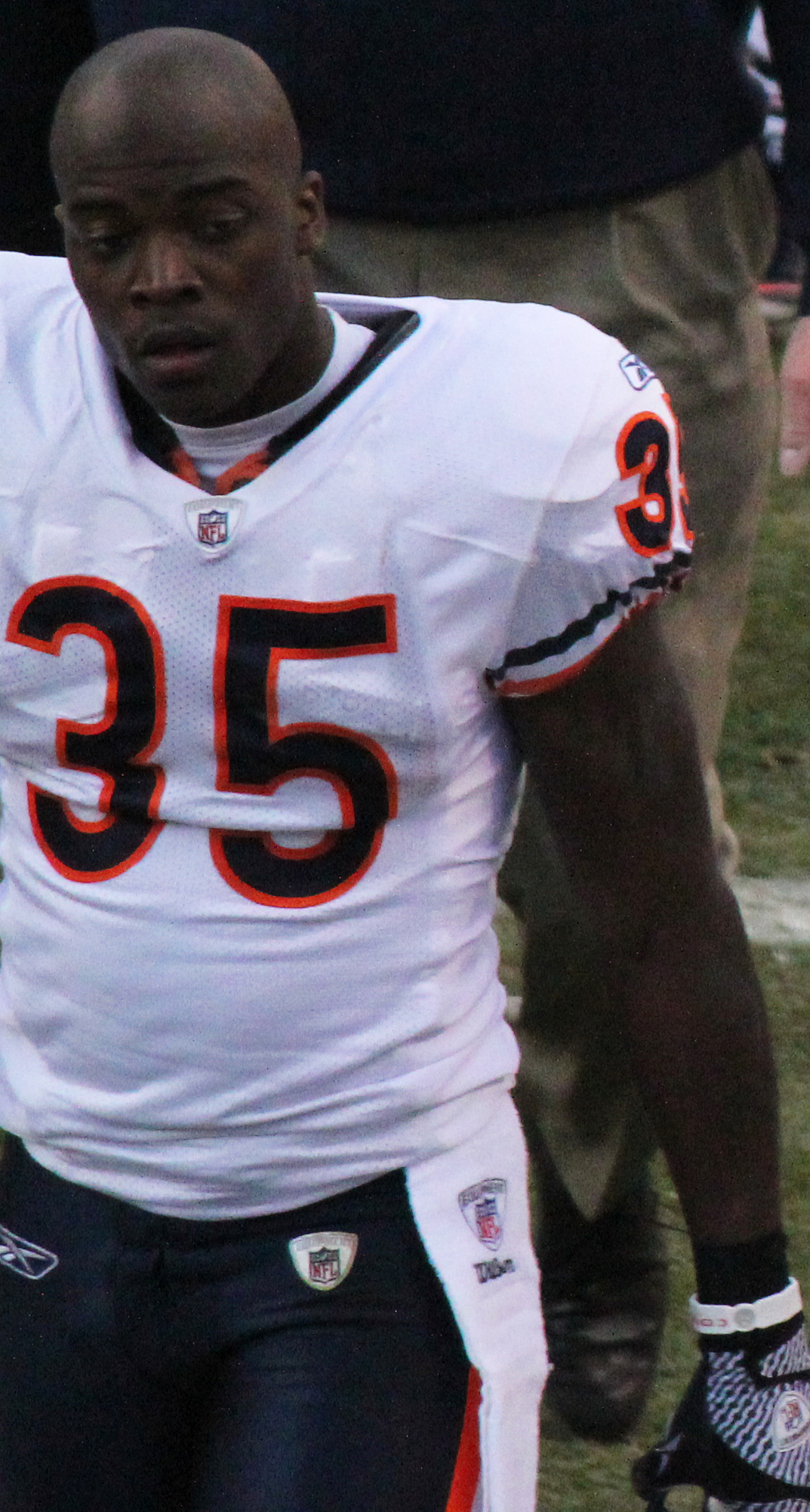
- Bowman with the Chicago Bears in 2011

No. 35, 38, 31, 30
- Position: Cornerback

Personal information
- Born: November 18, 1984 (age 42); Columbia, South Carolina, U.S.
- Listed height: 6 ft 1 in (1.85 m)
- Listed weight: 210 lb (95 kg)

Career information
- High school: Bartlett (Anchorage, Alaska)
- College: Nebraska
- NFL draft: 2008: 5th round, 142nd overall pick

Career history
- Chicago Bears (2008–2011); Minnesota Vikings (2012)*; Chicago Bears (2012–2013); New York Giants (2014); Miami Dolphins (2015)
- * Offseason or practice squad member only

Career NFL statistics
- Total tackles: 204
- Forced fumbles: 3
- Fumble recoveries: 6
- Pass deflections: 29
- Interceptions: 13
- Defensive touchdowns: 3
- Stats at Pro Football Reference

Zackary Bowman (born November 18, 1984) is an American former professional football player who was a cornerback in the National Football League (NFL). He played college football for the Nebraska Cornhuskers and New Mexico Military Broncos. Bowman was selected by the Chicago Bears in the fifth round of the 2008 NFL draft. He also played for the New York Giants and Miami Dolphins.

== Early life ==
Bowman attended Batesburg-Leesville High School in Batesburg, South Carolina, and later attended Bartlett High School in Anchorage, Alaska, and graduated in 2003.

== College career ==
After Bowman attended New Mexico Military Institute, he attended University of Nebraska–Lincoln. In his two seasons at Nebraska, Bowman had a total of 56 tackles, 20 pass breakups, and three interceptions; he played in 22 games, nine of which he started.

Bowman had to redshirt the 2006 season due to torn anterior cruciate ligament in his left knee on the third day of fall practice and missed the season.

== Professional career ==
Pre-draft measurables
Height	Weight	Arm length	Hand span	40-yard dash	10-yard split	20-yard split	20-yard shuttle	Three-cone drill	Vertical jump	Broad jump	Bench press
6 ft 0 1/8 in (1.83 m)	197 lb (89 kg)	33 in (0.84 m)	10 1/4 in (0.26 m)	4.39 s	1.51 s	2.54 s	4.21 s	7.10 s	32.0 in (0.81 m)	10 ft 5 in (3.18 m)	18 reps
All values from NFL Combine/Pro Day

=== Chicago Bears (first stint) ===
The Chicago Bears selected in the fifth round of the 2008 NFL draft. He made the team's opening day roster but was relegated to the practice squad to make room for guard Dan Buenning, who was acquired in a trade. The Bears signed Bowman off the practice squad in week seven, after their top three cornerbacks were ruled out of a game against the Minnesota Vikings due to injuries. Bowman played a crucial role in the Bears victory over the Vikings by recovering a fumbled punt in the endzone for a touchdown. Bowman sustained an injury in the fourth quarter, which should have left him sidelined for the remainder of the game, but he insisted on returning due to the Bears shallow depth at the cornerback position. He recorded his first career interception upon returning, which also prevented the Vikings from engineering a last second touchdown drive. Bowman required surgery to repair the injury he sustained during the game, and was placed on the team's injury reserve for the remainder of the season. His efforts during the week merited him the "NFC Special Teams Player of the Week" Award.

In training camp 2009, coaches were very impressed with Bowman's abilities and play on the practice field. Despite missing most of the preseason with a hamstring injury, Bowman was expected to be a key part of the Bears secondary in 2009 with teammates Nathan Vasher and Charles Tillman.

In Week 2 of the regular season, Bowman took over Vasher's starting spot at cornerback. He recorded 66 tackles, six interceptions, and one forced fumble over the course of the season.

During the Bears 2010 mini camp, head coach Lovie Smith announced that Bowman would replace Charles Tillman as the team's left side cornerback. In a typical Cover 2 defense, teams usually place their best cornerback on the left side of their defensive formations.

=== Minnesota Vikings ===
Bowman signed a one-year deal with the Minnesota Vikings on March 26, 2012. On September 2, 2012, he was waived to make room for A. J. Jefferson.

=== Chicago Bears (second stint) ===
Bowman was later re-signed by the Bears. In Week 16 against the Arizona Cardinals, Bowman recovered Beanie Wells' fumble in the endzone for a Bears touchdown, as the Bears won 28–13. In 2013, Bowman was an unrestricted free agent, but signed a one-year deal with the Bears. During the season, Bowman played in all 16 games while starting in seven, and recorded 49 tackles along with three interceptions.

=== New York Giants ===
On March 31, 2014, Bowman signed a one-year deal with the New York Giants.

=== Miami Dolphins ===
On April 13, 2015, Bowman signed a deal with the Miami Dolphins. He was released on September 6, however, re-signed later that day. He was waived on November 24.

== NFL career statistics ==
Legend
	Led the league
**Bold**	Career high

=== Regular season ===
Year	Team	Games		Tackles					Interceptions					Fumbles			
Year	Team	GP	GS	Cmb	Solo	Ast	Sck	TFL	Int	Yds	TD	Lng	PD	FF	FR	Yds	TD
2008	CHI	1	0	2	1	1	0.0	0	1	0	0	0	1	0	1	0	**1**
2009	CHI	**16**	**12**	**66**	**59**	**7**	0.0	0	**6**	**67**	0	39	**10**	**1**	0	0	0
2010	CHI	13	3	32	28	4	0.0	1	0	0	0	0	0	**1**	1	0	0
2011	CHI	**16**	1	14	13	1	0.0	0	0	0	0	0	0	**1**	1	0	0
2012	CHI	11	0	11	10	1	0.0	1	0	0	0	0	2	0	**2**	**1**	**1**
2013	CHI	**16**	7	48	45	3	0.0	**2**	3	**67**	**1**	**43**	8	0	0	0	0
2014	NYG	**16**	5	24	19	5	0.0	0	2	25	0	18	6	0	1	0	0
2015	MIA	10	0	7	6	1	0.0	0	1	38	0	38	2	0	0	0	0
Total		99	28	204	181	23	0.0	4	13	197	1	43	29	3	6	1	2

=== Playoffs ===
Year	Team	Games		Tackles					Interceptions					Fumbles			
Year	Team	GP	GS	Cmb	Solo	Ast	Sck	TFL	Int	Yds	TD	Lng	PD	FF	FR	Yds	TD
2010	CHI	**2**	0	0	0	0	0.0	0	0	0	0	0	0	0	0	0	0
Total		2	0	0	0	0	0.0	0	0	0	0	0	0	0	0	0	0

== Personal life ==
Bowman was a sociology major and earned his degree in December 2007. He is married and has three sons.
