= Marcus Harrison =

American football player (born 1984)

- Harrison with the Chicago Bears in 2008

No. 94, 99, 90
- Position: Defensive tackle

Personal information
- Born: July 10, 1984 (age 42); Little Rock, Arkansas, U.S.
- Listed height: 6 ft 3 in (1.91 m)
- Listed weight: 316 lb (143 kg)

Career information
- High school: Mills (Little Rock)
- College: Arkansas
- NFL draft: 2008: 3rd round, 90th overall pick

Career history
- Chicago Bears (2008–2010); New England Patriots (2011)

Awards and highlights
- Second-team All-SEC (2007)

Career NFL statistics
- Total tackles: 55
- Sacks: 3
- Stats at Pro Football Reference

Marcus Harrison (born July 10, 1984) is an American former professional football player who was a defensive tackle in the National Football League (NFL). He was selected by the Chicago Bears in the third round of the 2008 NFL draft after playing college football for the Arkansas Razorbacks.

== Early life ==
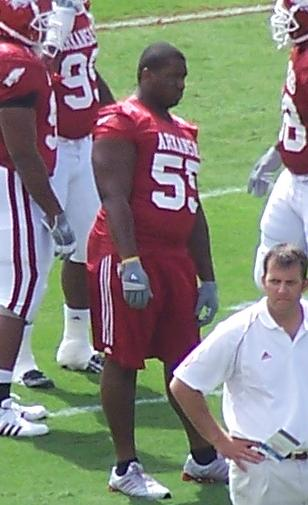
Harrison with the Razorbacks in 2006

Harrison played high school football at Mills High School in Little Rock. After a successful career as an Arkansas Razorback, Harrison stepped up for the Chicago Bears and had a productive rookie season, rotating in and playing extensively alongside Tommie Harris.

== Professional career ==
On September 4, 2011, Harrison was claimed off waivers by the Carolina Panthers. However, he failed his physical and was placed back on waivers.

On October 14, Harrison was signed by the New England Patriots, and to make room, the Patriots released Phillip Adams. He was released on October 15, 2011.
