= Joey LaRocque =

American football player (born 1986)

No. 90, 54
- Position: Linebacker

Personal information
- Born: March 15, 1986 (age 40); Agoura Hills, California, U.S.
- Listed height: 6 ft 2 in (1.88 m)
- Listed weight: 228 lb (103 kg)

Career information
- High school: Agoura (Agoura Hills)
- College: Oregon State
- NFL draft: 2008: 7th round, 243rd overall pick

Career history
- Chicago Bears (2008); Omaha Nighthawks (2010); New York Jets (2011)*
- * Offseason or practice squad member only

Awards and highlights
- Second-team All-Pac-10 (2007)

Career NFL statistics
- Total tackles: 6
- Stats at Pro Football Reference

Joey LaRocque (born March 15, 1986) is an American former professional football player who was a linebacker in the National Football League (NFL). He was selected by the Chicago Bears in the seventh round of the 2008 NFL draft. He played college football at College of the Canyons before transferring to the Oregon State Beavers. He was also a member of the Omaha Nighthawks and New York Jets.

== Professional career ==
=== Chicago Bears ===
LaRocque was selected by the Bears in the seventh round of the 2008 NFL draft with the 243rd overall pick. He was signed to a four-year contract May 30, 2008. After beginning his rookie season on the team's practice squad, he was signed to the active roster on September 19. He appeared in 14 games for the Bears as a rookie, recording six tackles.

LaRocque was waived by the Bears on July 30, 2009.

=== New York Jets ===
LaRocque was signed to a future contract by the New York Jets on January 5, 2011. He was waived on September 2.
