= Rashied Davis =

American football player and coach (born 1979)

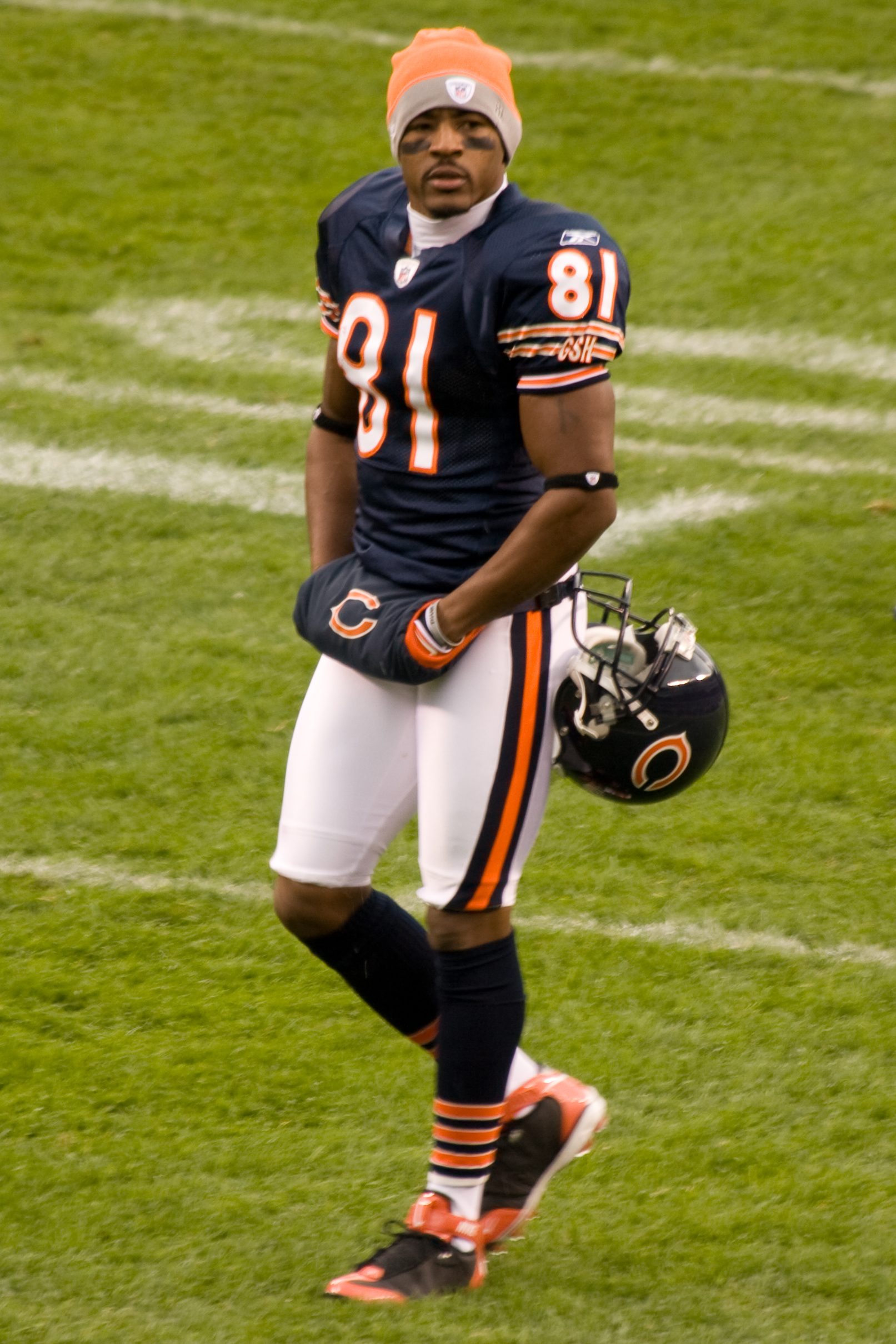
- Davis with the Chicago Bears in 2008

No. 21, 81, 82
- Position: Wide receiver

Personal information
- Born: July 24, 1979 (age 47); Los Angeles, California, U.S.
- Listed height: 5 ft 9 in (1.75 m)
- Listed weight: 187 lb (85 kg)

Career information
- High school: John F. Kennedy (Los Angeles)
- College: West Los Angeles (1998–1999); San Jose State (2000–2001)
- NFL draft: 2002: undrafted

Career history

Playing
- San Jose SaberCats (2002−2005); Chicago Bears (2005−2010); Detroit Lions (2011); Chicago Bears (2012)*; San Jose SaberCats (2013)
- * Offseason or practice squad member only

Coaching
- West Valley (2004) (running back coach); Carmel High School (IL) (assistant)

Awards and highlights
- 2× ArenaBowl champion (2002, 2004)

Career NFL statistics
- Receptions: 92
- Receiving yards: 1,095
- Receiving touchdowns: 5
- Stats at Pro Football Reference

Career AFL statistics
- Receptions: 163
- Receiving yards: 2,106
- Receiving touchdowns: 35
- Stats at ArenaFan.com

Rashied Khalid Davis (born July 24, 1979) is an American former professional football player who was a wide receiver in the National Football League (NFL). He played college football for the San Jose State Spartans and was signed by the San Jose SaberCats of the Arena Football League (AFL) as an undrafted free agent in 2002. He played in the NFL for the Chicago Bears and Detroit Lions.

== Early life ==
Davis was born in Los Angeles, California, and attended John F. Kennedy High School in Granada Hills, Los Angeles. His father was murdered when Davis was only eight years old. Davis and his eight other siblings were raised by their mother and aunt. Unlike most other football players on the team, Davis had not played organized football prior to his sophomore year in high school. He did not start a single game in high school, and spent most of the time on the bench.

He later attended West Los Angeles College, where he played football as wide receiver and defensive back for the college's team. He was the team's most productive player as a junior. He later finished his collegiate career at San Jose State. In 2004, Davis was a running backs coach at West Valley College in Saratoga, California. Davis earned his B.A. in sociology from San Jose State in 2006.

== Professional career ==
=== San Jose SaberCats (first stint) ===
Davis signed with the San Jose SaberCats of the Arena Football League (AFL) in 2002 and played as a wide receiver and cornerback. Davis missed much of the SaberCats' 2002 ArenaBowl championship season due to injury and joined the team practice squad after recovery. Davis debuted professionally in 2003 with the SaberCats. His best years came in 2004 and 2005, in which Davis emerged as one of the team's most productive players, posting a team leading 1,785 all-purpose yards. In 2005, Davis scored 44 touchdowns and 264 points as a return specialist and wide receiver. He caught 100 passes for 1,420 yards and 30 touchdowns, which was a franchise record, and also scored eight rushing touchdowns. Davis's feats earned him recognition as the team's most valuable player and offensive player of the year.

=== Chicago Bears (first stint) ===
Davis left the AFL in hopes of finding new opportunities in the National Football League. He tried out for the San Francisco 49ers, but failed to make the team. The Oakland Raiders planned to offer Davis a contract, but later retracted their offer. The Chicago Bears finally signed Davis to a contract in 2005. He initially started his career as a cornerback, but was converted into a wide receiver with two interceptions before the 2006 season.

Davis mainly played on special teams and was behind wide receivers Muhsin Muhammad, Bernard Berrian, and Mark Bradley on the team's depth chart. He appeared in all 16 games for the Bears during the 2006 NFL season where he recorded 22 catches for 303 yards and 2 touchdowns. He caught the game-winning touchdown against the Minnesota Vikings during Week 3, and later tallied a pivotal 30-yard reception that setup the game-winning field goal during the Divisional Round of the 2006–07 playoffs against the Seattle Seahawks.

A restricted free agent in the 2008 offseason, Davis signed his one-year, $1,927,000 tender offer on April 18. Davis caught a career-high 35 passes, for 445 yards and 2 touchdowns. At one point during the 2008 season, the Bears were prepared to use Davis as a reserve cornerback due to several injuries in their secondary. During the 2009 preseason, Davis was locked in fierce competition with Devin Aromashodu and Brandon Rideau for a spot on the team's final 53-man roster. Despite only catching three passes during the entire preseason, Davis, a key special teams contributor, beat out Rideau for the final wide receiver spot. Davis only recorded five receptions during the entire 2009 season, and spent most of his time on special teams.

Davis continued to be a regular member of the Bears special teams in 2010. He finished the 2010 season with nine receptions, for 84 yards and one touchdown.

=== Detroit Lions ===
On July 29, 2011, Davis signed with the Detroit Lions, where he was expected to see most of his playing time on special teams while also adding depth at the wide receiver position.

During a 2011 game against the Green Bay Packers on Thanksgiving, Davis filled in at cornerback, as the Lions had suffered a rash of injuries in the secondary. It was the first time he had played the position since 2005, as a player for the Bears. He finished the game with two tackles. Davis finished the 2011 season with four receptions, seven tackles, and two kick returns.

=== Chicago Bears (second stint) ===
On August 6, 2012, Davis signed a one-year contract with the Bears after Devin Thomas retired. On August 29, Davis was waived by the team.

=== San Jose SaberCats (second stint) ===
On July 25, 2013, Davis was assigned to the SaberCats. In the SaberCats' final regular season game on July 27, a 65–40 win over the Chicago Rush, Davis returned one kick for 17 yards. On July 29, the SaberCats placed Davis on injured reserve.

== Personal life ==
He has a wife named Dianna, a daughter named Alanna Lilly, and a son named Eli Rashied. Rashied Davis also worked at a Best Buy in San Jose while playing for the SaberCats.

After retiring from professional football, Davis joined his former teammate Jason McKie to coach football at Carmel Catholic High School. Davis also operates Saturday Place, a charity and community outreach program, that assists public school students in Chicago.

== See also ==
- List of Arena Football League and National Football League players
