= Chester Adams =

American football player (born 1985)

Profile
- Position: Guard

Personal information
- Born: February 6, 1985 (age 41); Luverne, Alabama, U.S.
- Listed height: 6 ft 4 in (1.93 m)
- Listed weight: 323 lb (147 kg)

Career information
- High school: Luverne
- College: Georgia
- NFL draft: 2008: 7th round, 222nd overall pick

Career history
- Chicago Bears (2008)*
- * Offseason or practice squad member only

Awards and highlights
- SEC All-Freshman (2004)
- Stats at Pro Football Reference

Chester Adams (born February 6, 1985) is an American former professional football player who was a guard in the National Football League (NFL). He was selected by the Chicago Bears in the seventh round of the 2008 NFL draft with the 222nd overall pick. He played college football for the Georgia Bulldogs.

== Early life ==
Adams played high school football at Luverne High School in Luverne, Alabama under former University of Alabama head coach Mike Dubose.
