= 2003 Chicago Bears season =

NFL team season

- Owner: The McCaskey Family
- General manager: Jerry Angelo
- Head coach: Dick Jauron
- Home stadium: Soldier Field

Results
- Record: 7–9
- Division place: 3rd NFC North
- Playoffs: Did not qualify

The 2003 Chicago Bears season was the franchise's 84th season in the National Football League (NFL). The team improved to a 7–9 record over its 4–12 record from 2002 under head coach Dick Jauron. The team was once again in a quarterbacking carousel with quarterbacks Kordell Stewart, Chris Chandler, and rookie Rex Grossman. In the end, head coach Dick Jauron was fired after the conclusion of the season.

== Offseason ==
| Additions | Subtractions |
|---|---|
| QB Kordell Stewart (Steelers) | QB Jim Miller (Colts) |
| T Aaron Gibson (Cowboys) | WR Marcus Robinson (Ravens) |
| TE Desmond Clark (Dolphins) | LB Rosevelt Colvin (Patriots) |
| | G Kevin Dogins (Falcons) |
| | LB Mike Caldwell (Panthers) |
| | DT Ted Washington (Patriots) |

=== Draft ===
2003 Chicago Bears draft
| Round | Pick | Player | Position | College | Notes |
| 1 | 14 | Michael Haynes | DE | Penn State | |
| 1 | 22 | Rex Grossman | QB | Florida | |
| 2 | 35 | Charles Tillman * | CB | Louisiana-Lafayette | |
| 3 | 68 | Lance Briggs * | LB | Arizona | |
| 4 | 100 | Todd Johnson | S | Florida | |
| 4 | 116 | Ian Scott | DT | Florida | |
| 5 | 139 | Bobby Wade | WR | Arizona | |
| 5 | 143 | Justin Gage | WR | Missouri | |
| 5 | 171 | Tron LaFavor | DT | Florida | |
| 6 | 191 | Joe Odom | LB | Purdue | |
| 6 | 206 | Brock Forsey | RB | Boise State | |
| 7 | 261 | Bryan Anderson | OG | Pittsburgh | |
Made roster † Pro Football Hall of Fame * Made at least one Pro Bowl during career

=== Undrafted free agents ===
2003 undrafted free agents of note
| Player | Position | College |
|---|---|---|
| Brooks Barnard | Punter | Maryland |
| Tony Benford | Defensive Tackle | Florida State |
| Julius Curry | Safety | Michigan |
| Jason Gross | Cornerback | TCU |
| Patrick Hughes | Tight end | Florida State |
| Robert Johnson | Tight end | Auburn |
| Pete Lougheed | Tackle | Purdue |
| Jerry Schumacher | Linebacker | Illinois |
| James Thornton | Cornerback | Morris Brown |
| Tim Vincent | Tackle | Northern Illinois |
| Alex Walls | Kicker | Tennessee |
| Billy Wingfield | Wide receiver | Boise State |
| Cameron Worrell | Safety | Fresno State |

== Stadium changes and new mascot ==
During this season, the team returns to its original home, Soldier Field, after a year of renovations and rebuilding during the previous season; in which the home games were temporary held at Memorial Stadium in the campus of the University of Illinois in Champaign. The first 2 preseason games were held at Memorial Stadium, August 9 against the Indianapolis Colts and on August 16 against the Denver Broncos. The first home game held at the newly renovated Soldier Field was the primetime game against Green Bay Packers on September 29, 2003, televised on ABC's Monday Night Football.

Also introducing this season is the team's brand new mascot Staley Da Bear. Staley was introduced during the team's home game on September 29, 2003 against the Green Bay Packers. Prior to the start of this season, Don Wachter says that he will no longer wear the team's unofficial mascot "Bearman," but he continued to appear in the team's 2004 and 2005 seasons. Staley was officially selected as a mascot for the 2004 Pro Bowl.

== Broadcasting changes ==
Beginning this season, the television broadcasts of the Bears preseason games were moved back to NBC Owned-and-operated station WMAQ-TV as part of a five-year broadcast partnership with the station and the team, these marked the return of the Bears preseason games on the station for the first time since the 1993 season and the return of the NFL games on the station for the first time since the 1997 season after the NBC network lost the rights of the American Football Conference to CBS (locally thru WBBM-TV) beginning with the 1998 season; ending its 9-year relationship with the team and WBBM-TV. the Pre-game show Bears Gameday Live and the Post-game show Bears Gamenight were also premiered on the station at the start of the regular season. Telemundo Owned-and-operated station WSNS-TV provided the spanish language broadcasts of the preseason games following the purchase of the station and the network by NBC. WBBM-AM regained their radio rights for the third season.

== Staff ==
2003 Chicago Bears staff
| Front office {{{front_office}}} Head coaches: Head coach – Dick Jauron; Offensive coaches: Offensive coordinator – John Shoop; Quarterbacks – Greg Olson; Running backs – Earle Mosley; Wide receivers – Todd Haley; Tight ends – Pat Flaherty; Offensive line – Bob Wylie; Offensive quality control – Charlie Coiner | Defensive coaches: Defensive coordinator – Greg Blache; Defensive line coach – Larry Brooks; Assistant defensive line – Richard Dent; Linebackers – Gary Moeller; Defensive backs – Vance Bedford; Assistant defensive backs/secondary/assistant special teams/defensive quality control – Chuck Bullough; Special teams coaches: Special teams – Mike Sweatman; Strength and conditioning: Strength coach – Russ Riederer |

== Roster ==
2003 Chicago Bears roster
| Quarterbacks (QB): 12 Chris Chandler; 8 Rex Grossman; 10 Kordell Stewart; Running backs (RB): 27 Rabih Abdullah; 44 Brock Forsey; 37 Jason McKie FB; 36 Stanley Pritchett FB; 35 Anthony Thomas; Wide receivers (WR): 86 Marty Booker; 87 Justin Gage; 18 Daryl Jones; 81 Ahmad Merritt KR; 83 David Terrell; 84 Bobby Wade; Tight ends (TE): 88 Desmond Clark; 85 John Gilmore; 48 Gabe Reid | Offensive linemen (OL): 68 Bryan Anderson G; 79 Steve Edwards G; 69 Mike Gandy T; 78 Aaron Gibson T; 57 Olin Kreutz C; 63 Corbin Lacina G; 60 Terrence Metcalf G/T; 58 Chris Villarrial G; 67 Josh Warner C; Defensive linemen (DL): 70 Alfonso Boone DT; 96 Alex Brown DE; 93 Phillip Daniels DE; 97 Michael Haynes DE; 74 Charles Hill DT; 73 Tron LaFavor DT; 98 Bryan Robinson DT; 95 Ian Scott DT; 99 Joe Tafoya DE; 94 Keith Traylor NT | Linebackers (LB): 55 Lance Briggs OLB; 92 Hunter Hillenmeyer MLB; 53 Warrick Holdman OLB; 90 Bryan Knight OLB; 54 Brian Urlacher MLB; Defensive backs (DB): 23 Jerry Azumah CB/KR; 30 Mike Brown FS; 25 Bobby Gray SS; 26 Todd McMillon CB; 21 R. W. McQuarters CB/PR; 33 Charles Tillman CB; 22 Brock Williams CB; 24 Cameron Worrell SS; Special teams (ST): 16 Brooks Barnard P; 2 Paul Edinger K; 65 Patrick Mannelly LS; 4 Brad Maynard P | Practice squad: 49 Mark Anelli TE; 38 Dwone Hicks RB; 71 Israel Idonije DE; 52 Marcus Reese LB; 76 Cliff Washburn DT; Reserve: 75 Marc Colombo T (IR); 43 Mike Green S (IR); 82 Robert Johnson TE (IR); 32 Todd Johnson S (IR); 89 Dustin Lyman TE (IR); 72 Qasim Mitchell T (IR); 59 Joe Odom LB (IR); 29 Adrian Peterson RB (IR); 64 Rex Tucker T (IR); 80 Dez White WR (IR); Rookies in italics 53 active, 10 reserve, 5 practice squad |

== Schedule ==
=== Preseason ===
| Week | Date | Opponent | Result | Record | Venue |
|---|---|---|---|---|---|
| 1 | August 9 | Indianapolis Colts | W 20–18 | 1–0 | Memorial Stadium |
| 2 | August 16 | Denver Broncos | L 10–15 | 1–1 | Memorial Stadium |
| 3 | August 22 | at Arizona Cardinals | L 17–27 | 1–2 | Sun Devil Stadium |
| 4 | August 27 | at New England Patriots | L 23–38 | 1–3 | Gillette Stadium |

=== Regular season ===
| Week | Date | Opponent | Result | Record | Venue |
|---|---|---|---|---|---|
| 1 | September 7 | at San Francisco 49ers | L 7–49 | 0–1 | Candlestick Park |
| 2 | September 14 | at Minnesota Vikings | L 13–24 | 0–2 | Hubert H. Humphrey Metrodome |
| 3 | Bye | | | | |
| 4 | September 29 | Green Bay Packers | L 23–38 | 0–3 | Soldier Field |
| 5 | October 5 | Oakland Raiders | W 24–21 | 1–3 | Soldier Field |
| 6 | October 12 | at New Orleans Saints | L 13–20 | 1–4 | Louisiana Superdome |
| 7 | October 19 | at Seattle Seahawks | L 17–24 | 1–5 | Seahawks Stadium |
| 8 | October 26 | Detroit Lions | W 24–16 | 2–5 | Soldier Field |
| 9 | November 2 | San Diego Chargers | W 20–7 | 3–5 | Soldier Field |
| 10 | November 9 | at Detroit Lions | L 10–12 | 3–6 | Ford Field |
| 11 | November 16 | St. Louis Rams | L 21–23 | 3–7 | Soldier Field |
| 12 | November 23 | at Denver Broncos | W 19–10 | 4–7 | Invesco Field at Mile High |
| 13 | November 30 | Arizona Cardinals | W 28–3 | 5–7 | Soldier Field |
| 14 | December 7 | at Green Bay Packers | L 21–34 | 5–8 | Lambeau Field |
| 15 | December 14 | Minnesota Vikings | W 13–10 | 6–8 | Soldier Field |
| 16 | December 21 | Washington Redskins | W 27–24 | 7–8 | Soldier Field |
| 17 | December 28 | at Kansas City Chiefs | L 3–31 | 7–9 | Arrowhead Stadium |

== Game summaries ==
=== Week 1: at San Francisco 49ers ===
at Candlestick Park in San Francisco

| | 1 | 2 | 3 | 4 | Total |
|---|---|---|---|---|---|
| Bears | 0 | 7 | 0 | 0 | 7 |
| 49ers | 10 | 23 | 6 | 10 | 49 |

==== Scoring summary ====
Q1 – SF – 7:51 – Jeff Chandler 22 yd FG (SF 3–0)

Q1 – SF – 3:23 – 12 yd TD pass from Jeff Garcia to Garrison Hearst (Chandler kick) (SF 10–0)

Q2 – CHI – 12:05 – 3 yd TD pass from Kordell Stewart to Desmond Clark (Paul Edinger kick) (SF 10–7)

Q2 – SF – 6:01 – Jeff Garcia 3 yd TD run (Chandler kick) (SF 17–7)

Q2 – SF – 3:18 – 16 yd TD pass from Jeff Garcia to Tai Streets (kick failed) (SF 23–7)

Q2 – SF – 0:44 – Ahmed Plummer 68 yd interception return TD (Chandler kick) (SF 30–7)

Q2 – SF – 0:00 – Jeff Chandler 29 yd FG (SF 33–7)

Q3 – SF – 7:29 – Jeff Chandler 28 yd FG (SF 36–7)

Q3 – SF – 2:37 – Jeff Chandler 24 yd FG (SF 39–7)

Q4 – SF – 14:05 – Jeff Chandler 26 yd FG (SF 42–7)

Q4 – SF – 12:16 – Garrison Hearst 1 yd TD run (Chandler kick) (SF 49–7)

Attendance – 67,554

=== Week 2: at Minnesota Vikings ===
at Hubert H. Humphrey Metrodome in Minneapolis, Minnesota

| | 1 | 2 | 3 | 4 | Total |
|---|---|---|---|---|---|
| Bears | 3 | 7 | 3 | 0 | 13 |
| Vikings | 7 | 10 | 0 | 7 | 24 |

==== Scoring summary ====
Q1 – MIN – 13:57 – Moe Williams 1 yd TD run (Aaron Elling kick) (MIN 7–0)

Q1 – CHI – 10:35 – Paul Edinger 42 yd FG (MIN 7–3)

Q2 – MIN – 11:18 – Aaron Elling 23 yd FG (MIN 10–3)

Q2 – MIN – 1:55 – 3 yd TD pass from Daunte Culpepper to Jim Kleinsasser (Elling kick) (MIN 17–3)

Q2 – CHI – 0:39 – 14 yd TD pass from Kordell Stewart to David Terrell (Edinger kick) (MIN 17–10)

Q3 – CHI – 4:43 – Paul Edinger 43 yd FG (MIN 17–13)

Q4 – MIN – 2:56 – 11 yd TD pass from Daunte Culpepper to Jim Kleinsasser (Elling kick) (MIN 24–13)

Attendance – 64,144

=== Week 4: vs Green Bay Packers ===
at Soldier Field in Chicago

| | 1 | 2 | 3 | 4 | Total |
|---|---|---|---|---|---|
| Packers | 17 | 7 | 0 | 14 | 38 |
| Bears | 0 | 6 | 3 | 14 | 23 |

==== Scoring summary ====
Q1 – GB – 11:55 – Ahman Green 60 yd TD run (Ryan Longwell kick) (GB 7–0)

Q1 – GB – 2:32 – Ryan Longwell 34 yd FG (GB 10–0)

Q1 – GB – 0:19 – Ahman Green 6 yd TD run (Longwell kick) (GB 17–0)

Q2 – CHI – 9:07 – Paul Edinger 31 yd FG (GB 17–3)

Q2 – GB – 3:51 – 14 yd TD pass from Brett Favre to William Henderson (Longwell kick) (GB 24–3)

Q2 – CHI – 0:48 – Paul Edinger 38 yd FG (GB 24–6)

Q3 – CHI – 0:02 – Paul Edinger 41 yd FG (GB 24–9)

Q4 – CHI – 12:36 – Anthony Thomas 67 yd TD run (Edinger kick) (GB 24–16)

Q4 – GB – 8:51 – 9 yd TD pass from Brett Favre to Javon Walker (Longwell kick) (GB 31–16)

Q4 – GB – 4:21 – 1 yd TD pass from Brett Favre to Bubba Franks (Longwell kick) (GB 38–16)

Q4 – CHI – 1:28 – Kordell Stewart 1 yd TD run (Edinger kick) (GB 38–23)

Attendance – 61,500

=== Week 5: vs Oakland Raiders ===
at Soldier Field in Chicago

| | 1 | 2 | 3 | 4 | Total |
|---|---|---|---|---|---|
| Raiders | 6 | 12 | 0 | 3 | 21 |
| Bears | 0 | 3 | 3 | 18 | 24 |

==== Scoring summary ====
Q1 – OAK – 6:10 – Zack Crockett 1 yd TD run (kick failed) (OAK 6–0)

Q2 – CHI – 11:05 – Paul Edinger 35 yd FG (OAK 6–3)

Q2 – OAK – 7:35 – Sebastian Janikowski 36 yd FG (OAK 9–3)

Q2 – OAK – 6:19 – Sebastian Janikowski 39 yd FG (OAK 12–3)

Q2 – OAK – 1:51 – Sebastian Janikowski 32 yd FG (OAK 15–3)

Q2 – OAK – 0:00 – Sebastian Janikowski 33 yd FG (OAK 18–3)

Q3 – CHI – 5:37 – Paul Edinger 50 yd FG (OAK 18–6)

Q4 – CHI – 14:53 – 14 yd TD pass from Kordell Stewart to Marty Booker (Edinger kick) (OAK 18–13)

Q4 – CHI – 6:58 – Stanley Pritchett 8 yd TD run (Kordell Stewart 2 pt conversion run) (CHI 21–18)

Q4 – OAK – 3:30 – Sebastian Janikowski 49 yd FG (21–21)

Q4 – CHI – 0:00 – Paul Edinger 48 yd FG (CHI 24–21)

Attendance – 61,500

=== Week 6: at New Orleans Saints ===
at Louisiana Superdome in New Orleans, Louisiana

| | 1 | 2 | 3 | 4 | Total |
|---|---|---|---|---|---|
| Bears | 0 | 3 | 0 | 10 | 13 |
| Saints | 3 | 3 | 7 | 7 | 20 |

==== Scoring summary ====
Q1 – NO – 7:53 – John Carney 50 yd FG (NO 3-0)

Q2 – CHI – 7:35 – Paul Edinger 28 yd FG (3–3)

Q2 – NO – 0:00 – John Carney 30 yd FG (NO 6-3)

Q3 – NO – 12:01 – 9 yd TD pass from Aaron Brooks to Ernie Conwell (Carney kick) (NO 13-3)

Q4 – CHI – 13:18 – Paul Edinger 31 yd FG (NO 13-6)

Q4 – NO – 7:18 – 6 yd TD pass from Aaron Brooks to Joe Horn (Carney kick) (NO 20-6)

Q4 – CHI – 2:10 – 4 yd TD pass from Kordell Stewart to Dez White (Edinger kick) (NO 20-13)

Attendance – 68,390

=== Week 7: at Seattle Seahawks ===
at Seahawks Stadium in Seattle

| | 1 | 2 | 3 | 4 | Total |
|---|---|---|---|---|---|
| Bears | 3 | 3 | 0 | 11 | 17 |
| Seahawks | 0 | 14 | 3 | 7 | 24 |

==== Scoring summary ====
Q1 – CHI – 3:08 – Paul Edinger 50 yd FG (CHI 3–0)

Q2 – SEA – 12:41 – Shaun Alexander 1 yd TD run (Josh Brown kick) (SEA 7–3)

Q2 – SEA – 8:47 – 25 yd TD pass from Matt Hasselbeck to Bobby Engram (Brown kick) (SEA 14–3)

Q2 – CHI – 1:49 – Paul Edinger 35 yd FG (SEA 14–6)

Q3 – SEA – 5:37 – Josh Brown 45 yd FG (SEA 17–6)

Q4 – CHI – 13:28 – Paul Edinger 40 yd FG (SEA 17–9)

Q4 – CHI – 4:12 – Stanley Pritchett 1 yd TD run (Chris Chandler 2 pt conversion run) (17–17)

Q4 – SEA – 0:58 – Shaun Alexander 25 yd TD run (Brown kick) (SEA 24–17)

Attendance – 65,671

=== Week 8: vs Detroit Lions ===
at Soldier Field in Chicago

| | 1 | 2 | 3 | 4 | Total |
|---|---|---|---|---|---|
| Lions | 0 | 0 | 8 | 8 | 16 |
| Bears | 0 | 10 | 14 | 0 | 24 |

==== Scoring summary ====
Q2 – CHI – 7:22 – 22 yd TD pass from Chris Chandler to Justin Gage (Paul Edinger kick) (CHI 7–0)

Q2 – CHI – 0:00 – Paul Edinger 37 yd FG (CHI 10–0)

Q3 – CHI – 14:46 – Jerry Azumah 89 yd kickoff return TD (Edinger kick) (CHI 17–0)

Q3 – CHI – 5:23 – Brock Forsey 8 yd TD run (Edinger kick) (CHI 24–0)

Q3 – DET – 5:10 – Reggie Swinton 96 yd kickoff return TD (2 pt conversion pass from Joey Harrington to Az-Zahir Hakim) (CHI 24–8)

Q4 – DET – 0:53 – 3 yd TD pass from Joey Harrington to Mikhael Ricks (2 pt conversion pass from Joey Harrington to Scotty Anderson) (CHI 24–16)

Attendance – 61,428

=== Week 9: vs San Diego Chargers ===
at Soldier Field in Chicago

| | 1 | 2 | 3 | 4 | Total |
|---|---|---|---|---|---|
| Chargers | 0 | 0 | 0 | 7 | 7 |
| Bears | 3 | 7 | 3 | 7 | 20 |

==== Scoring summary ====
Q1 – CHI – 8:33 – Paul Edinger 38 yd FG (CHI 3–0)

Q2 – CHI – 9:27 – Anthony Thomas 1 yd TD run (Edinger kick) CHI 10–0)

Q3 – CHI – 4:27 – Paul Edinger 22 yd FG (CHI 13–0)

Q4 – SD – 9:13 – LaDainian Tomlinson 3 yd TD run (Steve Christie kick) (CHI 13–7)

Q4 – CHI – 0:21 – Anthony Thomas 1 yd TD run (Edinger kick) (CHI 20–7)

Attendance – 61,500

=== Week 10: at Detroit Lions ===
at Ford Field in Detroit, Michigan

| | 1 | 2 | 3 | 4 | Total |
|---|---|---|---|---|---|
| Bears | 0 | 3 | 7 | 0 | 10 |
| Lions | 3 | 3 | 3 | 3 | 12 |

==== Scoring summary ====
Q1 – DET – 1:53 – Jason Hanson 24 yd FG (DET 3–0)

Q2 – CHI – 11:28 – Paul Edinger 43 yd FG (3–3)

Q2 – DET – 2:40 – Jason Hanson 25 yd FG (DET 6–3)

Q3 – CHI – 7:52 – 12 yd TD pass from Chris Chandler to Desmond Clark (Edinger kick) (CHI 10–6)

Q3 – DET – 2:49 – Jason Hanson 30 yd FG (CHI 10–9)

Q4 – DET – 0:39 – Jason Hanson 48 yd FG (DET 12–10)

Attendance – 61,492

=== Week 11: vs St. Louis Rams ===
at Soldier Field in Chicago

| | 1 | 2 | 3 | 4 | Total |
|---|---|---|---|---|---|
| Rams | 3 | 0 | 7 | 13 | 23 |
| Bears | 0 | 14 | 0 | 7 | 21 |

==== Scoring summary ====
Q1 – STL – 1:14 – Jeff Wilkins 41 yd FG (STL 3–0)

Q2 – CHI – 10:25 – R. W. McQuarters 60 yd punt return TD (Paul Edinger kick (CHI 7–3)

Q2 – CHI – 3:04 – Anthony Thomas 1 yd TD run (Edinger kick) (CHI 14–3)

Q3 – STL – 3:48 – 4 yd TD pass from Marc Bulger to Torry Holt (Wilkins kick) (CHI 14–10)

Q4 – STL – 12:46 – 4 yd TD pass from Marc Bulger to Brandon Manumaleuna (Wilkins kick) (STL 17–14)

Q4 – STL – 7:21 – Jeff Wilkins 44 yd FG (STL 20–14)

Q4 – CHI – 5:58 – 11 yd TD pass from Chris Chandler to Dez White (Edinger kick) (CHI 21–20)

Q4 – STL – 0:38 – Jeff Wilkins 31 yd FG (STL 23–21)

Attendance – 61,820

=== Week 12: at Denver Broncos ===
at INVESCO Field at Mile High in Denver, Colorado

| | 1 | 2 | 3 | 4 | Total |
|---|---|---|---|---|---|
| Bears | 3 | 6 | 0 | 10 | 19 |
| Broncos | 7 | 0 | 3 | 0 | 10 |

==== Scoring summary ====
Q1 – DEN – 3:59 – 1 yd TD pass from Jake Plummer to Rod Smith (Jason Elam kick) (DEN 7–0)

Q1 – CHI – 1:31 – Paul Edinger 33 yd FG (DEN 7–3)

Q2 – CHI – 1:57 – Paul Edinger 23 yd FG (DEN 7–6)

Q2 – CHI – 0:03 – Paul Edinger 54 yd FG (CHI 9–7)

Q3 – DEN – 11:41 – Jason Elam 25 yd FG (DEN 10–9)

Q4 – CHI – 12:45 – Kordell Stewart 1 yd TD run (Edinger kick) (CHI 16–10)

Q4 – CHI – 8:46 – Paul Edinger 47 yd FG (CHI 19–10)

Attendance – 75,540

=== Week 13: vs Arizona Cardinals ===
at Soldier Field in Chicago

| | 1 | 2 | 3 | 4 | Total |
|---|---|---|---|---|---|
| Cardinals | 3 | 0 | 0 | 0 | 3 |
| Bears | 7 | 0 | 0 | 21 | 28 |

==== Scoring summary ====
Q1 – CHI – 8:50 – 2 yd TD pass from Kordell Stewart to Marty Booker (Paul Edinger kick) (CHI 7–0)

Q1 – ARZ – 2:37 – Neil Rackers 32 yd FG (CHI 7–3)

Q4 – CHI – 13:55 – 10 yd TD pass from Kordell Stewart to Dez White (Edinger kick) (CHI 14–3)

Q4 – CHI – 7:46 – Kordell Stewart 8 yd TD run (Edinger kick) (CHI 21–3)

Q4 – CHI – 3:33 – Brock Forsey 9 yd TD run (Edinger kick) (CHI 28–3)

Attendance – 61,550

=== Week 14: at Green Bay Packers ===
at Lambeau Field in Green Bay, Wisconsin

| | 1 | 2 | 3 | 4 | Total |
|---|---|---|---|---|---|
| Bears | 14 | 0 | 0 | 7 | 21 |
| Packers | 0 | 13 | 6 | 15 | 34 |

==== Scoring summary ====
Q1 – CHI – 1:46 – 61 yd TD pass from Kordell Stewart to Marty Booker (Paul Edinger kick) (CHI 7–0)

Q1 – CHI – 0:50 – Lance Briggs 45 yd interception return TD (Edinger kick) (CHI 14–0)

Q2 – GB – 11:12 – Ryan Longwell 24 yd FG (CHI 14–3)

Q2 – GB – 9:57 – Ryan Longwell 38 yd FG (CHI 14–6)

Q2 – GB – 2:43 – 22 yd TD pass from Brett Favre to Javon Walker (Longwell kick) (CHI 14–13)

Q3 – GB – 6:52 – Ryan Longwell 35 yd FG (GB 16–14)

Q3 – GB – 0:43 – Ryan Longwell 45 yd FG (GB 19–14)

Q4 – GB – 9:16 – Mike McKenzie 90 yd interception return TD (2 pt conversion pass from Brett Favre to Bubba Franks) (GB 27–14)

Q4 – GB – 2:26 – Ahman Green 2 yd TD run (Longwell kick) (GB 34–14)

Q4 – CHI – 2:13 – Jerry Azumah 88 yd kickoff return TD (Edinger kick) (GB 34–21)

Attendance – 70,458

=== Week 15: vs Minnesota Vikings ===
at Soldier Field in Chicago

| | 1 | 2 | 3 | 4 | Total |
|---|---|---|---|---|---|
| Vikings | 0 | 3 | 0 | 7 | 10 |
| Bears | 3 | 7 | 3 | 0 | 13 |

==== Scoring summary ====
Q1 – CHI – 13:10 – Paul Edinger 38 yd FG (CHI 3–0)

Q2 – CHI – 10:53 – Anthony Thomas 1 yd TD run (Edinger kick) (CHI 10–0)

Q2 – MIN – 1:10 – Aaron Elling 22 yd FG (CHI 10–3)

Q3 – CHI – 4:09 – Paul Edinger 22 yd FG (CHI 13–3)

Q4 – MIN – 10:23 – 16 yd TD pass from Daunte Culpepper to Randy Moss (Elling kick) (CHI 13–10)

Attendance – 61,804

=== Week 16: vs Washington Redskins ===
at Soldier Field in Chicago

| | 1 | 2 | 3 | 4 | Total |
|---|---|---|---|---|---|
| Redskins | 10 | 7 | 0 | 7 | 24 |
| Bears | 10 | 0 | 14 | 3 | 27 |

==== Scoring summary ====
Q1 – WAS – 10:12 – John Hall 27 yd FG (WAS 3–0)

Q1 – CHI – 9:57 – 59 yd TD pass from Rex Grossman to Marty Booker (Paul Edinger kick) (CHI 7–3)

Q1 – CHI – 2:45 – Paul Edinger 19 yd FG (CHI 10–3)

Q1 – WAS – 0:48 – 36 yd TD pass from Rod Gardner to Chad Morton (Hall kick) (10–10)

Q2 – WAS – 0:16 – 14 yd TD pass from Tim Hasselbeck to Laveranues Coles (Hall kick) (WAS 17–10)

Q3 – CHI – 8:23 – 11 yd TD pass from Rex Grossman to Justin Gage (Edinger kick) (17–17)

Q3 – CHI – 0:34 – Anthony Thomas 3 yd TD run (Edinger kick) (CHI 24–17)

Q4 – WAS – 12:52 – 19 yd TD pass from Tim Hasselbeck to Laveranues Coles (Hall kick) (24–24)

Q4 – CHI – 0:05 – Paul Edinger 45 yd FG (CHI 27–24)

Attendance – 61,719

=== Week 17:at Kansas City Chiefs ===
at Arrowhead Stadium in Kansas City, Missouri

| | 1 | 2 | 3 | 4 | Total |
|---|---|---|---|---|---|
| Bears | 0 | 0 | 3 | 0 | 3 |
| Chiefs | 0 | 14 | 7 | 10 | 31 |

==== Scoring summary ====
Q2 – KC – 13:40 – Priest Holmes 1 yd TD run (Morten Andersen kick) (KC 7–0)

Q2 – KC – 7:07 – 6 yd TD pass from Trent Green to Eddie Kennison (Andersen kick) (KC 14–0)

Q3 – CHI – 9:24 – Paul Edinger 48 yd FG (KC 14–3)

Q3 – KC – 0:58 – Priest Holmes 2 yd TD run (Andersen kick) (KC 21–3)

Q4 – KC – 10:03 – Morten Andersen 38 yd FG (KC 24–3)

Q4 – KC – 3:40 – Larry Johnson 5 yd TD run (Andersen kick) (KC 31–3)

Attendance – 78,413

== Standings ==
NFC North
| | W | L | T | PCT | DIV | CONF | PF | PA | STK |
|---|---|---|---|---|---|---|---|---|---|
| ^{(4)} Green Bay Packers | 10 | 6 | 0 | .625 | 4–2 | 7–5 | 442 | 307 | W4 |
| Minnesota Vikings | 9 | 7 | 0 | .563 | 4–2 | 7–5 | 416 | 353 | L1 |
| Chicago Bears | 7 | 9 | 0 | .438 | 2–4 | 4–8 | 283 | 346 | L1 |
| Detroit Lions | 5 | 11 | 0 | .313 | 2–4 | 4–8 | 270 | 379 | W1 |
