= 2003 NFL draft =

2003 American football draft

General information
- Date: April 26–27, 2003
- Time: Noon EDT (April 26); 11:00 am EDT (April 27)
- Location: Theater at MSG in New York City, New York
- Networks: ESPN, ESPN2

Overview
- 262 total selections in 7 rounds
- League: NFL
- First selection: Carson Palmer, QB; Cincinnati Bengals
- Mr. Irrelevant: Ryan Hoag, WR; Oakland Raiders
- Most selections (12): Chicago Bears
- Fewest selections (3): Washington Redskins
- Hall of Famers: 3: WR Andre Johnson; SS Troy Polamalu; TE Antonio Gates

The 2003 NFL draft was the procedure by which National Football League (NFL) teams selected amateur college football players. The draft is known officially as the "NFL Annual Player Selection Meeting" and has been conducted annually since 1936. The draft was held April 26–27, 2003, at the Theatre at Madison Square Garden in New York City, New York. The league also held a supplemental draft after the regular draft and before the regular season.

The draft was broadcast on ESPN and ESPN2 beginning at noon on Saturday, April 26 and beginning at 11:00 am on Sunday, April 27. The draft consisted of seven rounds, with teams selecting in the reverse order of the finish the previous season. There were 32 compensatory picks distributed among 15 teams, with five teams each receiving four additional selections. In addition, the Houston Texans, who started play as an expansion franchise the previous season, were granted a supplemental selection in the middle of each of the draft's final five rounds, plus the final selection in the final two rounds.

There was little drama when the draft began with the Cincinnati Bengals selecting Carson Palmer, as Palmer had agreed to contract terms with the Bengals the previous day. He became the first Heisman Trophy winner selected first overall in the draft since Vinny Testaverde in 1987. The event ended nearly 30 hours later with Ryan Hoag being chosen by the Oakland Raiders with the final pick and thus gaining the distinction of "Mr. Irrelevant".

The draft took an odd turn with the Minnesota Vikings and their pick (7th) in the first round. The Vikings were apparently attempting to consummate a trade when their 15-minute time allowance elapsed. The Jaguars who selected next were quick to pounce, turning in their card to select QB Byron Leftwich immediately after the Vikings' time elapsed. The Panthers also took advantage of the gaffe, selecting OT Jordan Gross before the Vikings recovered and selected DT Kevin Williams. Nevertheless, the mistake may have worked in the Vikings' favor as Williams went on to be a mainstay in their team, missing only four games in his first 10 seasons in the NFL and making six Pro Bowls.

The colleges with the most players selected in the draft were Florida, Miami and Tennessee which each had eight players chosen. Meanwhile, Penn State and Miami each had four players selected in the first round. Eleven defensive linemen were selected in round one, eclipsing the previous record of nine, set in 2001. Ten underclassmen were taken in the first round, including three of the first four overall selections. The first round lasted nearly five hours. The Buffalo Bills selection of Miami's Willis McGahee as the first running back off the board was notable because he was recovering from a career-threatening injury he suffered in the Fiesta Bowl which it was believed could have caused him to miss the upcoming season.

This draft is notable for its excellent undrafted players, including longtime Dallas Cowboys quarterback Tony Romo and San Diego Chargers Hall of Famer tight end Antonio Gates.

The 262 players chosen in the draft were in the following positions:

- 53 defensive backs
- 36 wide receivers
- 30 linebackers
- 24 defensive ends
- 25 defensive tackles
- 23 running backs
- 21 offensive tackles
- 14 guards
- 14 tight ends
- 13 quarterbacks
- 10 centers
- 2 punters
- 1 kicker

== Player selections ==
*	Compensatory selection
^	Supplemental compensatory selection
¤	Extra selection awarded to expansion team
†	Pro Bowler
‡	Hall of Famer

Positions key
Offense	Defense	Special teams
QB — Quarterback; RB — Running back; FB — Fullback; WR — Wide receiver; TE — Tight end; OL — Offensive lineman; T — Tackle; G — Guard; C — Center	DL — Defensive lineman; DT — Defensive tackle (Note: Includes nose tackle (NT)); DE — Defensive end; EDGE — Edge rusher; LB — Linebacker (Note: Includes middle linebacker (MLB/MIKE), weakside linebacker (WILL), strongside linebacker (SAM), off-ball linebacker, and outside linebacker (OLB)); DB — Defensive back; CB — Cornerback; S — Safety (Note: Includes free safety (FS) and strong safety (SS))	K — Kicker (Note: Also known as a placekicker (PK)); P — Punter; LS — Long snapper; RS — Return specialist (Note: Includes kickoff and punt returners)

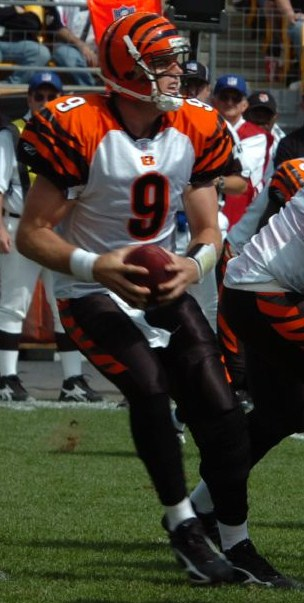
First overall pick Carson Palmer found early success as the starting quarterback for the Cincinnati Bengals before conflicts with team ownership. He was then traded to the Oakland Raiders before finishing his career strong with the Arizona Cardinals.

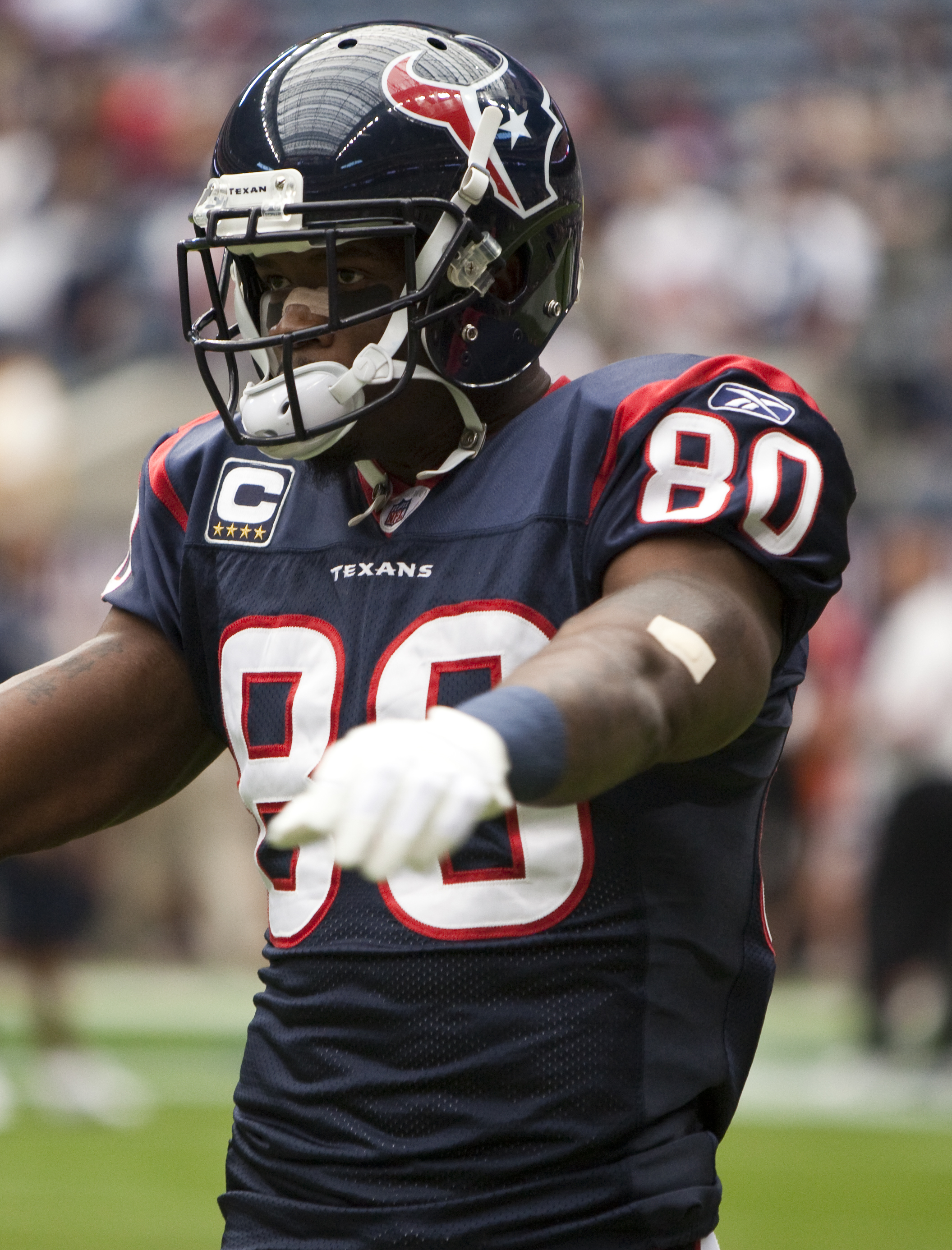
Wide receiver Andre Johnson was one of the first offensive superstars for the newly formed Houston Texans.

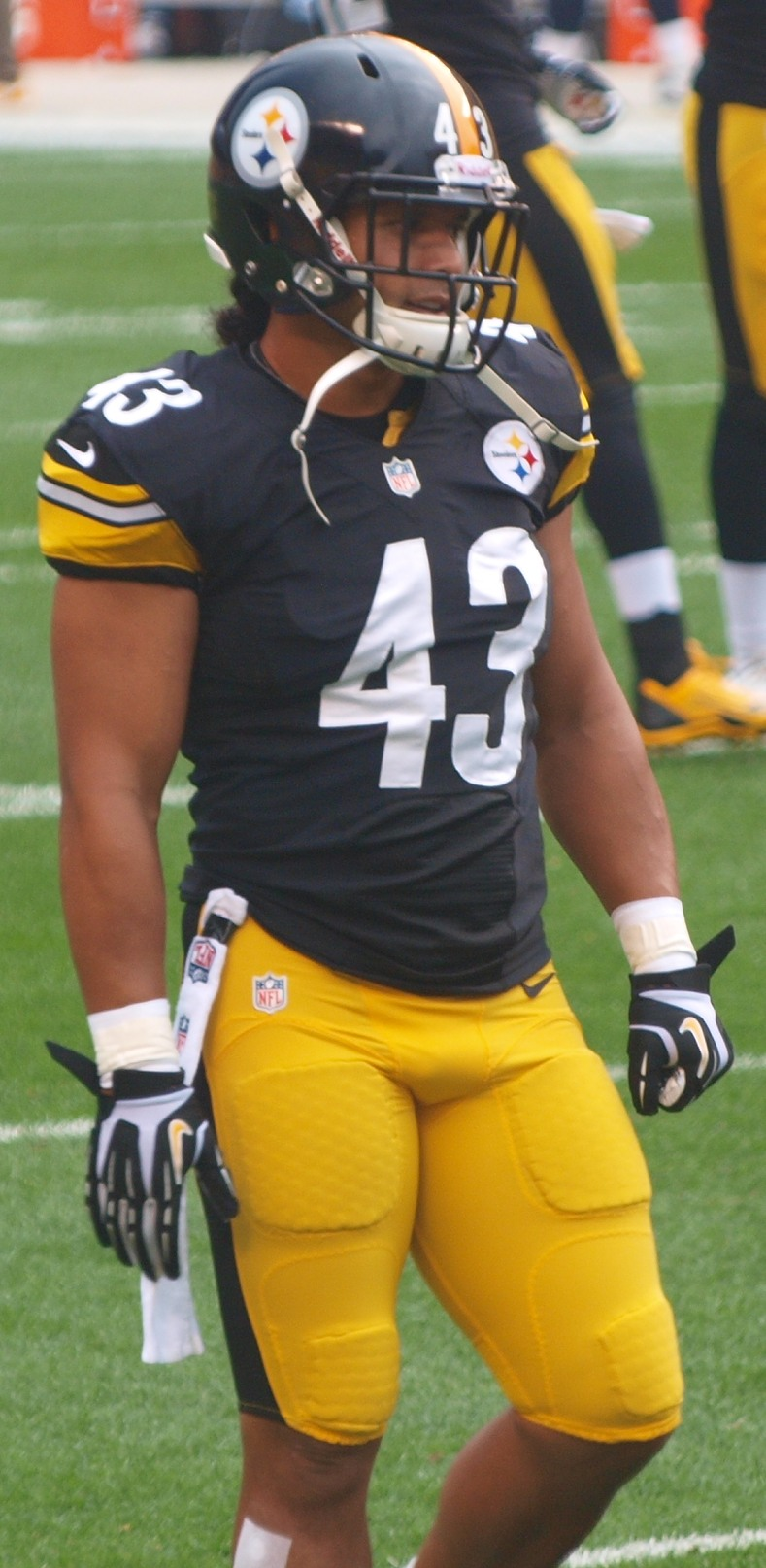
Troy Polamalu was the highest-picked safety in the draft and won two Super Bowls including multiple Pro Bowl and All-Pro selections with the Pittsburgh Steelers. He has since been inducted into the Pro Football Hall of Fame.

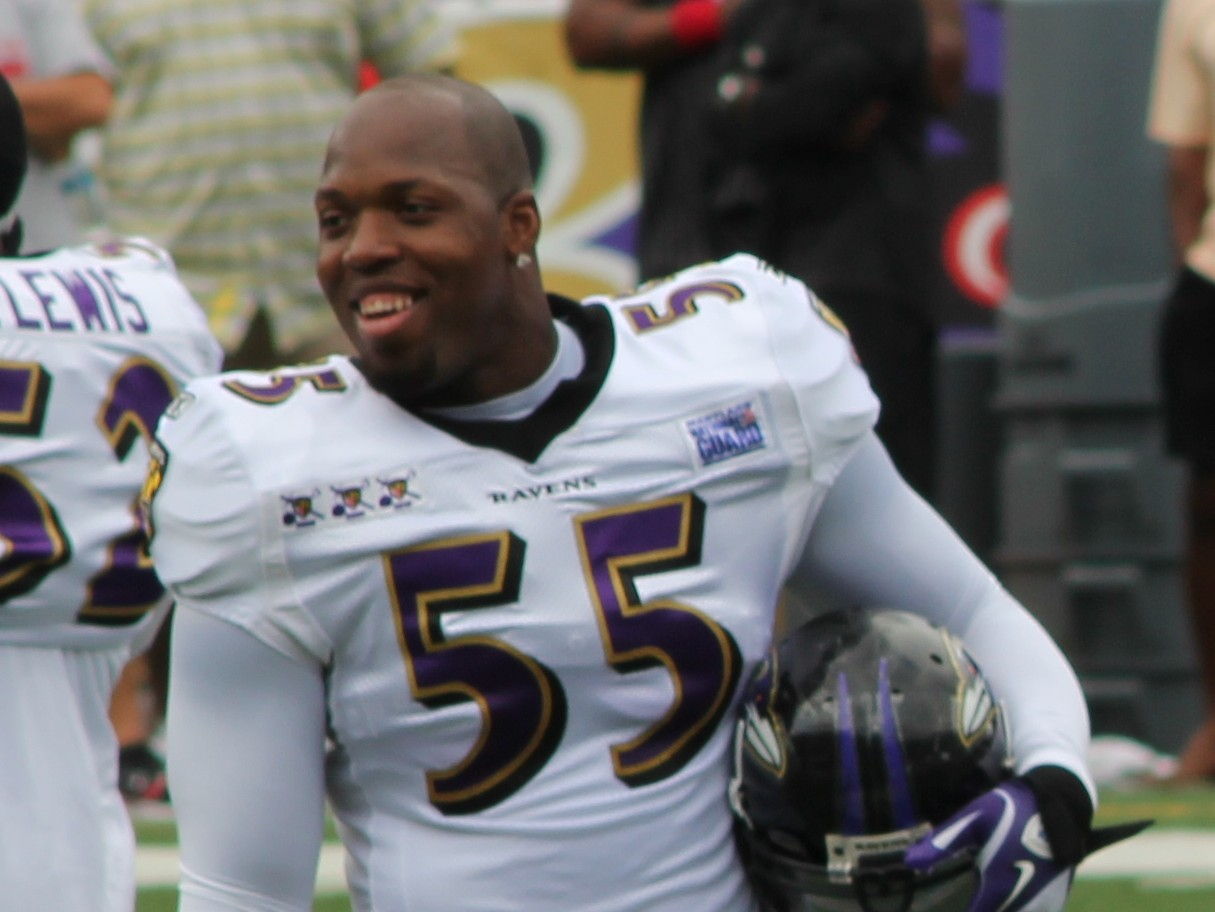
Terrell Suggs was drafted by the Baltimore Ravens and went on to win the 2011 AP NFL Defensive Player of the Year Award and Super Bowl XLVII.

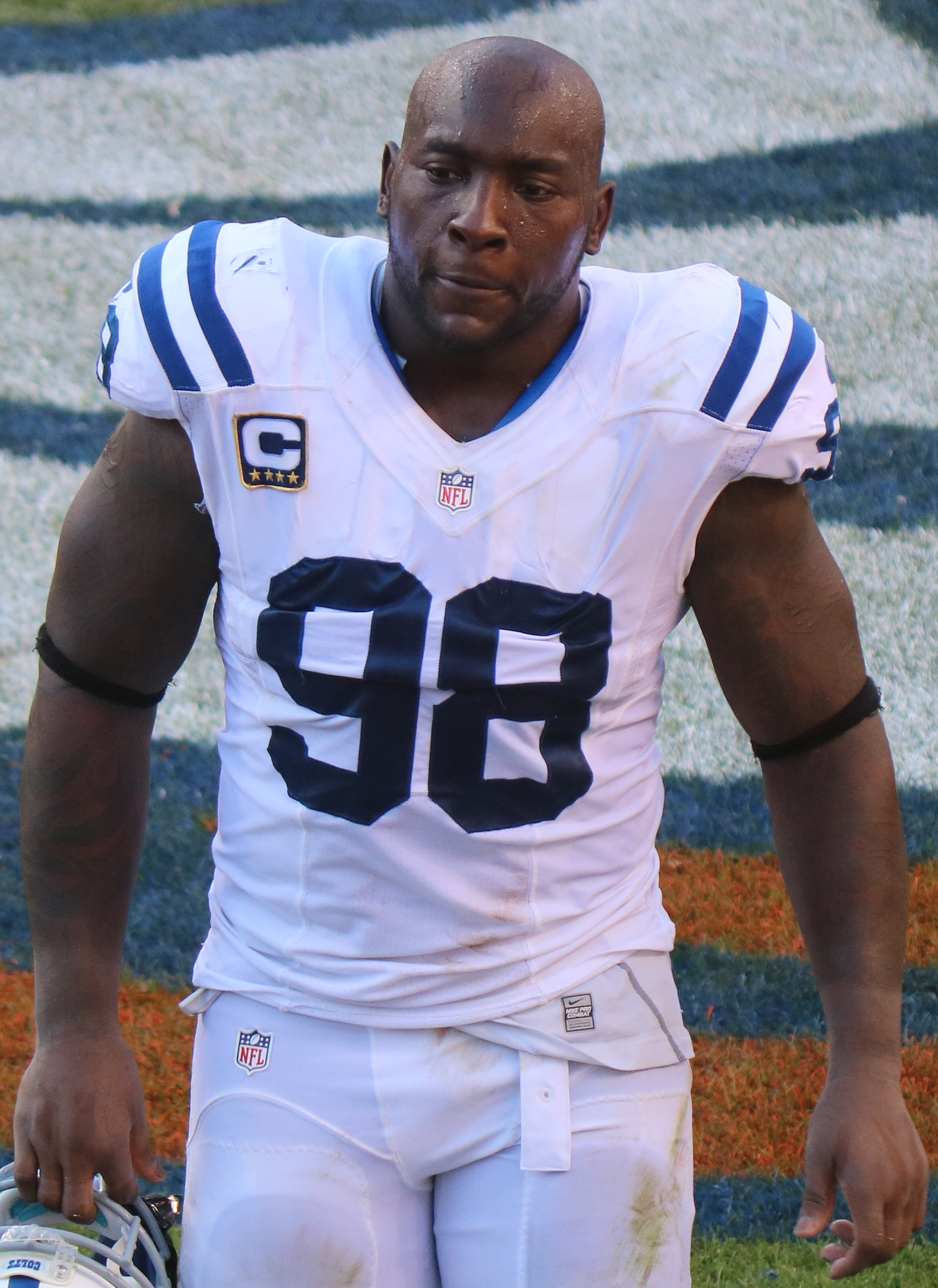
Fifth-round pick Robert Mathis went on to win a Super Bowl with the Indianapolis Colts and is the NFL's all-time leader in forced fumbles.

Rnd.	Pick	Team	Player	Pos.	College	Notes
1	1	Cincinnati Bengals	Carson Palmer ^{†}	QB	USC	2002 Heisman Trophy winner
1	2	Detroit Lions	Charles Rogers	WR	Michigan State	
1	3	Houston Texans	Andre Johnson^{‡}^{†}	WR	Miami (FL)	
1	4	New York Jets	Dewayne Robertson	DT	Kentucky	from Chicago (Note: No. 4: Chicago → NY Jets (PD). Chicago traded a first-round selection (4th overall) to the NY Jets in exchange for two first-round selections and a fourth-round selection (13th, 22nd and 116th overall).)
1	5	Dallas Cowboys	Terence Newman ^{†}	CB	Kansas State	
1	6	New Orleans Saints	Johnathan Sullivan	DT	Georgia	from Arizona (Note: No. 6: Arizona → New Orleans (D). Arizona traded first-, second- and fourth-round selections (6th, 37th and 102nd overall) to New Orleans in exchange for two first-round selections and a second-round selection (17th, 18th and 54th overall).)
1	7	Jacksonville Jaguars	Byron Leftwich	QB	Marshall	In place of Minnesota (time expired) (Note: No. 7: Minnesota held the 7th pick, but did not make their selection in the allotted time. By rule, they could make a selection at any time afterwards, but Jacksonville and Carolina were able to make their own picks before Minnesota could make its own.)
1	8	Carolina Panthers	Jordan Gross ^{†}	T	Utah	In place of Minnesota (time expired) (Note: No. 8: See No. 7.)
1	9	Minnesota Vikings	Kevin Williams ^{†}	DT	Oklahoma State	Instead of No. 7 (time expired) (Note: No. 9: See No. 7.)
1	10	Baltimore Ravens	Terrell Suggs ^{†}	DE	Arizona State	
1	11	Seattle Seahawks	Marcus Trufant ^{†}	CB	Washington State	
1	12	St. Louis Rams	Jimmy Kennedy	DT	Penn State	
1	13	New England Patriots	Ty Warren	DE	Texas A&M	from Washington via NY Jets and Chicago (Note: No. 13: Washington → NY Jets → Chicago → New England. Multiple trades: Washington → NY Jets (PD). Washington sent a first-round selection (13th overall) to the NY Jets as compensation for signing restricted free agent WR Laveranues Coles. NY Jets → Chicago (PD). See Round 1: Chicago → NY Jets Chicago → New England (D). Chicago traded a first-round selection (13th overall) to New England in exchange for first- and sixth-round selections (14th and 193rd overall).)
1	14	Chicago Bears	Michael Haynes	DE	Penn State	from Buffalo via New England (Note: No. 14: Buffalo → New England → Chicago. Multiple trades: Buffalo → New England (PD). Buffalo traded a first-round selection (14th overall) to New England in exchange for QB Drew Bledsoe. (Note: "Bills acquire QB Bledsoe from Patriots". Sports Illustrated. April 21, 2002.) New England → Chicago (D). See Round 1: Chicago → New England)
1	15	Philadelphia Eagles	Jerome McDougle	DE	Miami (FL)	from San Diego (Note: No. 15: San Diego → Philadelphia (D). San Diego traded a first-round selection (15th overall) to Philadelphia in exchange for first- and second-round selections (30th and 62nd overall).)
1	16	Pittsburgh Steelers	Troy Polamalu^{‡}^{†}	S	USC	from Kansas City (Note: No. 16: Kansas City → Pittsburgh (D). Kansas City traded a first-round selection (16th overall) to Pittsburgh in exchanege for first-, third- and sixth-round selections (27th, 92nd and 200th overall).)
1	17	Arizona Cardinals	Bryant Johnson	WR	Penn State	from New Orleans (Note: No. 17: New Orleans → Arizona (D). See Round 1: Arizona → New Orleans)
1	18	Arizona Cardinals	Calvin Pace	LB	Wake Forest	from Miami via New Orleans (Note: No. 18: Miami → New Orleans → Arizona. Multiple trades: Miami → New Orleans (PD). Miami traded a conditional first-round selection and a 2002 first-round selection to New Orleans in exchange for RB Ricky Williams. The conditional first-rounder was upgraded from the second round after Williams rushed for over 1,500 yards for Miami in 2002. New Orleans → Arizona (D). See Round 1: Arizona → New Orleans)
1	19	Baltimore Ravens	Kyle Boller	QB	California	from New England (Note: No. 19: New England → Baltimore (D). New England traded a first-round selection (19th overall) to Baltimore in exchange for a second-round selection (41st overall) and a 2004 first-round selection.)
1	20	Denver Broncos	George Foster	T	Georgia	
1	21	Cleveland Browns	Jeff Faine	C	Notre Dame	
1	22	Chicago Bears	Rex Grossman	QB	Florida	from NY Jets (Note: No. 22: NY Jets → Chicago (PD). See Round 1: Chicago → NY Jets)
1	23	Buffalo Bills	Willis McGahee ^{†}	RB	Miami (FL)	from Atlanta (Note: No. 23: Atlanta → Buffalo (PD). Atlanta traded a first-round selection (23rd overall) to Buffalo in exchange for WR Peerless Price.)
1	24	Indianapolis Colts	Dallas Clark ^{†}	TE	Iowa	
1	25	New York Giants	William Joseph	DT	Miami (FL)	
1	26	San Francisco 49ers	Kwame Harris	T	Stanford	
1	27	Kansas City Chiefs	Larry Johnson ^{†}	RB	Penn State	from Pittsburgh (Note: No. 27: Pittsburgh → Kansas City (D). See Round 1: Kansas City → Pittsburgh)
1	28	Tennessee Titans	Andre Woolfolk	CB	Oklahoma	
1	29	Green Bay Packers	Nick Barnett	LB	Oregon State	
1	30	San Diego Chargers	Sammy Davis	CB	Texas A&M	from Philadelphia (Note: No. 30: Philadelphia → San Diego (D). See Round 1: San Diego → Philadelphia)
1	31	Oakland Raiders	Nnamdi Asomugha ^{†}	CB	California	
1	32	Oakland Raiders	Tyler Brayton	DE	Colorado	from Tampa Bay (Note: No. 32: Tampa Bay → Oakland (PD). Tampa Bay traded a first-round selection (32nd overall), 2002 first- and second-round selections, and a 2004 second-round selection to Oakland in exchange for the rights to head coach Jon Gruden.)
2	33	Cincinnati Bengals	Eric Steinbach	G	Iowa	
2	34	Detroit Lions	Boss Bailey	LB	Georgia	
2	35	Chicago Bears	Charles Tillman ^{†}	CB	Louisiana–Lafayette	
2	36	New England Patriots	Eugene Wilson	CB	Illinois	from Houston (Note: No. 36: Houston → New England (D). Houston traded second- and fourth-round selections (36th and 117th overall) to New England in exchange for second- and third-round selections (41st and 75th overall).)
2	37	New Orleans Saints	Jon Stinchcomb ^{†}	T	Georgia	from Arizona (Note: No. 37: Arizona → New Orleans (D). See Round 1: Arizona → New Orleans)
2	38	Dallas Cowboys	Al Johnson	C	Wisconsin	
2	39	Jacksonville Jaguars	Rashean Mathis ^{†}	CB	Bethune–Cookman	
2	40	Minnesota Vikings	E.J. Henderson ^{†}	LB	Maryland	
2	41	Houston Texans	Bennie Joppru	TE	Michigan	from Baltimore via New England (Note: No. 41: Baltimore → New England → Houston. Multiple trades: Baltimore → New England (D). See Round 1: New England → Baltimore New England → Houston (D). See Round 2: Houston → New England)
2	42	Seattle Seahawks	Ken Hamlin ^{†}	S	Arkansas	
2	43	St. Louis Rams	Pisa Tinoisamoa	LB	Hawaii	
2	44	Washington Redskins	Taylor Jacobs	WR	Florida	
2	45	New England Patriots	Bethel Johnson	WR	Texas A&M	from Carolina (Note: No. 45: Carolina → New England (D). Carolina traded a second-round selection (45th overall) to New England in exchange for second- and fourth-round selections (50th and 120th overall).)
2	46	San Diego Chargers	Drayton Florence	CB	Tuskegee	
2	47	Kansas City Chiefs	Kawika Mitchell	LB	South Florida	
2	48	Buffalo Bills	Chris Kelsay	DE	Nebraska	
2	49	Miami Dolphins	Eddie Moore	LB	Tennessee	
2	50	Carolina Panthers	Bruce Nelson	C	Iowa	from New England (Note: No. 50: New England → Carolina (D). See Round 2: Carolina → New England)
2	51	Denver Broncos	Terry Pierce	LB	Kansas State	
2	52	Cleveland Browns	Chaun Thompson	LB	West Texas A&M	
2	53	New York Jets	Victor Hobson	LB	Michigan	
2	54	Arizona Cardinals	Anquan Boldin ^{†}	WR	Florida State	from New Orleans (Note: No. 54: New Orleans → Arizona (D). See Round 1: Arizona → New Orleans)
2	55	Atlanta Falcons	Bryan Scott	S	Penn State	
2	56	New York Giants	Osi Umenyiora ^{†}	DE	Troy State	
2	57	San Francisco 49ers	Anthony Adams	DT	Penn State	
2	58	Indianapolis Colts	Mike Doss	S	Ohio State	
2	59	Pittsburgh Steelers	Alonzo Jackson	LB	Florida State	
2	60	Tennessee Titans	Tyrone Calico	WR	Middle Tennessee	
2	61	Philadelphia Eagles	L.J. Smith	TE	Rutgers	
2	62	San Diego Chargers	Terrence Kiel	S	Texas A&M	from Green Bay via Philadelphia (Note: No. 62: Green Bay → Philadelphia → San Diego. Multiple trades: Green Bay → Philadelphia (PD). Green Bay traded a second-round selection (62nd overall) to Philadelphia in exchange for a fourth-round selection (120th overall) and CB Al Harris. Philadelphia → San Diego (D). See Round 1: San Diego → Philadelphia)
2	63	Oakland Raiders	Teyo Johnson	TE	Stanford	
2	64	Tampa Bay Buccaneers	Dewayne White	DE	Louisville	
3	65	Cincinnati Bengals	Kelley Washington	WR	Tennessee	
3	66	Detroit Lions	Cory Redding	DT	Texas	
3	67	Houston Texans	Antwan Peek	LB	Cincinnati	
3	68	Chicago Bears	Lance Briggs ^{†}	LB	Arizona	
3	69	Dallas Cowboys	Jason Witten ^{†}	TE	Tennessee	
3	70	Arizona Cardinals	Gerald Hayes	LB	Pittsburgh	
3	71	Minnesota Vikings	Nate Burleson	WR	Nevada	
3	72	Jacksonville Jaguars	Vince Manuwai	G	Hawaii	
3	73	Seattle Seahawks	Wayne Hunter	T	Hawaii	
3	74	St. Louis Rams	Kevin Curtis	WR	Utah State	
3	75	Houston Texans	Seth Wand	T	Northwest Missouri State	from Washington via New England (Note: No. 75: Washington → New England → Houston. Multiple trades: Washington → New England (PD). Washington traded a third-round selection (75th overall) and a 2004 fourth-round selection to New England in exchange for third- and fifth-round selections (81st and 140th overall). (Note: Felger, Michael (April 13, 2003). "Pats win 'Skins game". Boston Herald.) New England → Houston (D). See Round 2: Houston → New England)
3	76	Carolina Panthers	Mike Seidman	TE	UCLA	
3	77	Baltimore Ravens	Musa Smith	RB	Georgia	
3	78	Miami Dolphins	Wade Smith ^{†}	T	Memphis	from Kansas City via New Orleans and New England (Note: No. 78: Kansas City → New Orleans → New England → Miami. Multiple trades: Kansas City → New Orleans (PD). Kansas City traded a third-round selection (78th overall) to New Orleans in exchange for OT Willie Roaf. New Orleans → New England (D). New Orleans traded third- and seventh-round selections (78th and 239th overall) to New England in exchange for S Tebucky Jones. New England → Miami (PD). New England traded a third-round selection (78th overall) to Miami in exchange for a 2004 second-round selection.)
3	79	Green Bay Packers	Kenny Peterson	DT	Ohio State	from Buffalo (Note: No. 79: Buffalo → Green Bay (D). Buffalo traded a third-round selection (79th overall) to Green Bay in exchange for third- and fourth-round selections (94th and 127th overall).)
3	80	San Diego Chargers	Courtney Van Buren	T	Arkansas–Pine Bluff	
3	81	Washington Redskins	Derrick Dockery	G	Texas	from New England (Note: No. 81: New England → Washington (PD). See Round 3: Washington → New England.)
3	82	Carolina Panthers	Ricky Manning	CB	UCLA	from Denver (Note: No. 82: Denver → Carolina (D). Denver traded a third-round selection (82nd overall) to Carolina in exchange for two fourth-round selections and a seventh-round selection (108th, 120th and 227th overall).)
3¤	83	Oakland Raiders	Sam Williams	DE	Fresno State	from Houston (Note: No. 83: Houston → Oakland (D). Houston traded third- and seventh-round selections (83rd and 262nd overall) to Oakland in exchange for a 2004 second-round selection.)
3	84	Cleveland Browns	Chris Crocker	S	Marshall	
3	85	New York Jets	B. J. Askew	FB	Michigan	
3	86	New Orleans Saints	Cie Grant	LB	Ohio State	
3	87	Miami Dolphins	Taylor Whitley	G	Texas A&M	
3	88	Houston Texans	Dave Ragone	QB	Louisville	from Atlanta (Note: No. 88: Atlanta → Houston (PD). Atlanta traded a third-round selection (88th overall) to Houston in exchange for a 2002 fourth-round selection.)
3	89	San Francisco 49ers	Andrew Williams	DE	Miami (FL)	
3	90	Indianapolis Colts	Donald Strickland	CB	Colorado	
3	91	New York Giants	Visanthe Shiancoe	TE	Morgan State	
3	92	Kansas City Chiefs	Julian Battle	CB	Tennessee	from Pittsburgh (Note: No. 92: Pittsburgh → Kansas City (D). See Round 1: Kansas City → Pittsburgh)
3	93	Tennessee Titans	Chris Brown	RB	Colorado	
3	94	Buffalo Bills	Angelo Crowell	LB	Virginia	from Green Bay (Note: No. 94: Green Bay → Buffalo (D). See Round 3: Buffalo → Green Bay.)
3	95	Philadelphia Eagles	Billy McMullen	WR	Virginia	
3	96	Oakland Raiders	Justin Fargas	RB	USC	
3	97	Tampa Bay Buccaneers	Chris Simms	QB	Texas	
4	98	Cincinnati Bengals	Dennis Weathersby	CB	Oregon State	
4	99	Detroit Lions	Artose Pinner	RB	Kentucky	
4	100	Chicago Bears	Todd Johnson	S	Florida	
4	101	Houston Texans	Domanick Davis	RB	LSU	
4	102	New Orleans Saints	Montrae Holland	G	Florida State	from Arizona (Note: No. 102: Arizona → New Orleans (D). See Round 1: Arizona → New Orleans.)
4	103	Dallas Cowboys	Bradie James	LB	LSU	
4	104	Jacksonville Jaguars	George Wrighster	TE	Oregon	
4	105	Minnesota Vikings	Onterrio Smith	RB	Oregon	
4	106	St. Louis Rams	Shaun McDonald	WR	Arizona State	
4	107	St. Louis Rams	DeJuan Groce	CB	Nebraska	from Washington (Note: No. 107: Washington → St. Louis (PD). Washington traded a fourth-round selection (107th overall) and G David Loverne to St. Louis in exchange for RB Trung Canidate.)
4	108	Denver Broncos	Quentin Griffin	RB	Oklahoma	from Carolina (Note: No. 108: Carolina → Denver (D). See Round 3: Denver → Carolina.)
4	109	Baltimore Ravens	Jarret Johnson	DE	Alabama	
4	110	Seattle Seahawks	Seneca Wallace	QB	Iowa State	
4	111	Buffalo Bills	Terrence McGee ^{†}	CB	Northwestern State	
4	112	San Diego Chargers	Matt Wilhelm	LB	Ohio State	
4	113	Kansas City Chiefs	Brett Williams	T	Florida State	
4	114	Denver Broncos	Nick Eason	DT	Clemson	
4	115	Cleveland Browns	Lee Suggs	RB	Virginia Tech	
4	116	Chicago Bears	Ian Scott	DT	Florida	from NY Jets (Note: No. 116: NY Jets → Chicago (PD). See Round 1: Chicago → NY Jets)
4¤	117	New England Patriots	Dan Klecko	LB	Temple	from Houston (Note: No. 117: Houston → New England (D). See Round 2: Houston → New England.)
4	118	Cincinnati Bengals	Jeremi Johnson	FB	Western Kentucky	from New Orleans (Note: No. 118: New Orleans → Cincinnati (PD). New Orleans traded a fourth-round selection (118th overall) to Cincinnati in exchange for RB Curtis Keaton.)
4	119	Carolina Panthers	Colin Branch	S	Stanford	from Miami (Note: No. 119: Miami → Carolina (PD). Miami traded a fourth-round selection (119th overall) and DE Al Wallace to Carolina in exchange for DE Jay Williams.)
4	120	New England Patriots	Asante Samuel ^{†}	CB	UCF	from New England via Carolina and Denver (Note: No. 120: New England → Carolina → Denver → New England. Multiple trades: New England → Carolina (D). See Round 2: Carolina → New England. Carolina → Denver (D). See Round 3: Denver → Carolina. Denver → New England (D). Denver traded a fourth-round selection (120th overall) to New England in exchange for fourth- and fifth-round selections (128th and 157th overall).)
4	121	Atlanta Falcons	Justin Griffith	FB	Mississippi State	
4	122	Indianapolis Colts	Steve Sciullo	G	Marshall	
4	123	New York Giants	Rod Babers	CB	Texas	
4	124	San Francisco 49ers	Brandon Lloyd ^{†}	WR	Illinois	
4	125	Pittsburgh Steelers	Ike Taylor	CB	Louisiana–Lafayette	
4	126	Tennessee Titans	Rien Long	DT	Washington State	
4	127	Buffalo Bills	Sam Aiken	WR	North Carolina	from Philadelphia via Green Bay (Note: No. 127: Philadelphia → Green Bay → Buffalo. Multiple trades: Philadelphia → Green Bay (PD). See Round 2: Green Bay → Philadelphia. Green Bay → Buffalo (D). See Round 3: Buffalo → Green Bay.)
4	128	Denver Broncos	Bryant McNeal	DE	Clemson	from Green Bay via New England (Note: No. 128: Green Bay → New England → Denver. Multiple trades: Green Bay → New England (PD). Green Bay traded a fourth-round selection (128th overall) and a 2002 fourth-round selection to New England in exchange for WR Terry Glenn. New England → Denver (D). See Round 4: Denver → New England.)
4	129	Oakland Raiders	Shurron Pierson	DE	South Florida	
4	130	Tampa Bay Buccaneers	Lance Nimmo	T	West Virginia	
4*	131	Philadelphia Eagles	Jamaal Green	DE	Miami (FL)	
4*	132	Jacksonville Jaguars	LaBrandon Toefield	RB	LSU	
4*	133	Tampa Bay Buccaneers	Austin King	C	Northwestern	
4*	134	Baltimore Ravens	Ovie Mughelli ^{†}	FB	Wake Forest	
4*	135	Seattle Seahawks	Solomon Bates	LB	Arizona State	
5	136	Cincinnati Bengals	Khalid Abdullah	LB	Mars Hill	
5	137	Detroit Lions	Terrence Holt	S	NC State	
5	138	Indianapolis Colts	Robert Mathis ^{†}	DE	Alabama A&M	from Houston (Note: No. 138: Houston → Indianapolis (D). Houston traded a fifth-round selection (138th overall) to Indianapolis in exchange for a 2004 fourth-round selection.)
5	139	Chicago Bears	Bobby Wade	WR	Arizona	
5	140	New York Jets	Derek Pagel	S	Iowa	from Dallas via New England via Washington Redskins (Note: No. 140: Dallas → New England → Washington → NY Jets. Multiple trades: Dallas → New England (PD). Dallas traded a fifth-round selection (140th overall) and a 2002 seventh-round selection to New England in exchange for a 2002 fifth-round selection. New England → Washington (PD). See Round 3: Washington → New England. Washington → NY Jets (PD). Washington sent a fifth-round selection (140th overall) to the NY Jets as compensation for signing restricted free agent KR Chad Morton.)
5	141	Arizona Cardinals	Kenny King	DE	Alabama	
5	142	Cleveland Browns	Ryan Pontbriand ^{†}	C	Rice	from Minnesota (Note: No. 142: Minnesota → Cleveland (PD). Minnesota traded a fifth-round selection (142nd overall) to Cleveland in exchange for DL Stalin Colinet.)
5	143	Chicago Bears	Justin Gage	WR	Missouri	from Jacksonville (Note: No. 143: Jacksonville → Chicago (D). Jacksonville traded a fifth-round selection (143rd overall) to Chicago in exchange for two sixth-round selections and a seventh-round selection (176th, 193rd and 218th overall).)
5	144	Detroit Lions	James Davis	LB	West Virginia	from Washington (Note: No. 144: Washington → Detroit (D). Washington traded a fifth-round selection (144th overall) to Detroit in exchange for G Brenden Stai.)
5	145	Carolina Panthers	Kindal Moorehead	DT	Alabama	
5	146	Baltimore Ravens	Aubrayo Franklin	DT	Tennessee	
5	147	Green Bay Packers	James Lee	DT	Oregon State	from Seattle (Note: No. 147: Green Bay → Seattle (D). Seattle traded a fifth-round selection (147th overall) to Green Bay in exchange for fifth- and sixth-round selections (165th and 203rd overall).)
5	148	St. Louis Rams	Dan Curley	TE	Eastern Washington	
5	149	San Diego Chargers	Mike Scifres	P	Western Illinois	
5	150	New York Jets	Matt Walters	DE	Miami (FL)	from Kansas City (Note: No. 150: Kansas City → NY Jets (D). Kansas City traded fifth- and sixth-round selections (150th and 200th overall) to the NY Jets in exchange for fifth- and sixth-round selections (153rd and 189th overall).)
5	151	Buffalo Bills	Ben Sobieski	G	Iowa	
5	152	Cleveland Browns	Michael Lehan	CB	Minnesota	
5	153	Kansas City Chiefs	Jordan Black	T	Notre Dame	from NY Jets (Note: No. 153: NY Jets → Kansas City (D). See Round 5: Kansas City → NY Jets.)
5¤	154	Tennessee Titans	Donnie Nickey	S	Ohio State	from Houston via New England (Note: No. 154: Houston → New England → Tennessee. Multiple trades: Houston → New England (PD). Houston traded a fifth-round selection (154th overall) to New England in exchange for OT Greg Randall. New England → Tennessee (D). New England traded fifth- and seventh-round selections (154th and 225th overall) to Tennessee in exchange for fifth-, sixth- and seventh-round selections (164th, 201st and 243rd overall).)
5	155	New Orleans Saints	Melvin Williams	DE	Kansas State	
5	156	Miami Dolphins	Donald Lee	TE	Mississippi State	
5	157	Denver Broncos	Ben Claxton	C	Ole Miss	from New England (Note: No. 157: New England → Denver (D). See Round 4: Denver → New England.)
5	158	Denver Broncos	Adrian Madise	WR	TCU	
5	159	Atlanta Falcons	Jon Olinger	WR	Cincinnati	
5	160	New York Giants	David Diehl ^{†}	T	Illinois	
5	161	San Francisco 49ers	Aaron Walker	TE	Florida	
5	162	Indianapolis Colts	Keyon Whiteside	LB	Tennessee	
5	163	Pittsburgh Steelers	Brian St. Pierre	QB	Boston College	
5	164	New England Patriots	Dan Koppen ^{†}	C	Boston College	from Tennessee (Note: No. 164: Tennessee → New England (D). See Round 5: New England → Tennessee.)
5	165	Seattle Seahawks	Chris Davis	FB	Syracuse	from Green Bay (Note: No. 165: Green Bay → Seattle (D). See Round 5: Green Bay → Seattle.)
5	166	Green Bay Packers	Hunter Hillenmeyer	LB	Vanderbilt	from Philadelphia (Note: No. 166: Philadelphia → Green Bay (D). Philadelphia traded a fifth-round selection (166th overall) to Green Bay in exchange for sixth- and seventh-round selections (185th and 244th overall).)
5	167	Oakland Raiders	Doug Gabriel	WR	UCF	
5	168	Tampa Bay Buccaneers	Sean Mahan	G	Notre Dame	
5*	169	Miami Dolphins	J. R. Tolver	WR	San Diego State	
5*	170	St. Louis Rams	Shane Walton	S	Notre Dame	
5*	171	Chicago Bears	Tron LaFavor	DT	Florida	
5*	172	St. Louis Rams	Kevin Garrett	CB	SMU	
5*	173	Baltimore Ravens	Tony Pashos	T	Illinois	
6	174	Cincinnati Bengals	Langston Moore	DT	South Carolina	
6	175	Detroit Lions	David Kircus	WR	Grand Valley State	
6	–	Houston Texans	selection forfeited due to use of sixth-round selection to choose Milford Brown in 2002 supplemental draft.			
6	176	Jacksonville Jaguars	Brandon Green	DE	Rice	from Chicago Bears (Note: No. 176: Chicago → Jacksonville (D). See Round 5: Jacksonville → Chicago.)
6	177	Arizona Cardinals	Reggie Wells	G	Clarion	
6	178	Dallas Cowboys	B. J. Tucker	CB	Wisconsin	
6	179	Jacksonville Jaguars	David Young	S	Georgia Southern	
6	180	Minnesota Vikings	Eddie Johnson	P	Idaho State	
6	181	Miami Dolphins	Corey Jenkins	LB	South Carolina	from Carolina (Note: No. 181: Carolina → Miami (D). Carolina traded a sixth-round selection (181st overall) to Miami in exchange for two seventh-round selections (226th and 247th overall).)
6	182	Baltimore Ravens	Gerome Sapp	S	Notre Dame	
6	183	Seattle Seahawks	Rashad Moore	DT	Tennessee	
6	184	St. Louis Rams	Scott Tercero	G	California	
6	185	Philadelphia Eagles	Jeremy Bridges	T	Southern Miss	from Washington via Green Bay (Note: No. 185: Washington → Green Bay → Philadelphia. Multiple trades: Washington → Green Bay (PD). Washington sent a sixth-round selection (185th overall) to Green Bay as compensation for signing restricted free agent S Matt Bowen. Green Bay → Philadelphia (D). See Round 5: Philadelphia → Green Bay.)
6	186	Dallas Cowboys	Zuriel Smith	WR	Hampton	from Kansas City (Note: No. 186: Kansas City → Dallas (PD). Kansas City traded a sixth-round selection (186th overall), and 2002 first- and third-round selections to Dallas in exchange for a 2002 first-round selection. (Note: Tucker, Doug (April 20, 2002). "Chiefs Trade Up for UNC Defensive Tackle Ryan Sims". UNC (website) from AP.))
6	187	Buffalo Bills	Lauvale Sape	DT	Utah	
6	188	San Diego Chargers	Hanik Milligan ^{†}	S	Houston	
6	189	Kansas City Chiefs	Jimmy Wilkerson	DE	Oklahoma	from NY Jets (Note: No. 189: NY Jets → Kansas City (D). See Round 5: Kansas City → NY Jets.)
6	190	Minnesota Vikings	Michael Nattiel	LB	Florida	from New Orleans (Note: No. 190: New Orleans → Minnesota (PD). New Orleans traded a sixth-round selection (190th overall) to Minnesota in exchange for QB Todd Bouman.)
6	191	Chicago Bears	Joe Odom	LB	Purdue	from Miami (Note: No. 191: Miami → Chicago (PD). Miami traded a sixth-round selection (191st overall) and a 2002 sixth-round selection to Chicago in exchange for a 2002 seventh-round selection and QB Cade McNown.)
6¤	192	Houston Texans	Drew Henson	QB	Michigan	
6	193	Jacksonville Jaguars	Marques Ogden	T	Howard	from New England via Chicago (Note: No. 193: New England → Chicago → Jacksonville. Multiple trades: New England → Chicago (D). See Round 1: Chicago → New England Chicago → Jacksonville (D). See Round 5: Jacksonville → Chicago.)
6	194	Denver Broncos	Aaron Hunt	DE	Texas Tech	
6	195	Cleveland Browns	Antonio Garay	DT	Boston College	
6	196	Atlanta Falcons	LaTarence Dunbar	WR	TCU	
6	197	San Francisco 49ers	Arnaz Battle	WR	Notre Dame	
6	198	Indianapolis Colts	Cato June ^{†}	LB	Michigan	
6	199	New York Giants	Willie Ponder	WR	Southeast Missouri State	
6	200	New York Jets	Brooks Bollinger	QB	Wisconsin	from Pittsburgh via Kansas City (Note: No. 200: Pittsburgh → Kansas City → NY Jets. Multiple trades: Pittsburgh → Kansas City (D). See Round 1: Kansas City → Pittsburgh Kansas City → NY Jets (D). See Round 5: Kansas City → NY Jets.)
6	201	New England Patriots	Kliff Kingsbury	QB	Texas Tech	from Tennessee (Note: No. 201: Tennessee → New England (D). See Round 5: New England → Tennessee.)
6	202	Atlanta Falcons	Waine Bacon	CB	Alabama	from Philadelphia (Note: No. 202: Philadelphia → Atlanta (PD). Philadelphia traded a sixth-round selection (202nd overall) and a 2004 fourth-round selection to Atlanta in exchange for LB Mark Simoneau.)
6	203	New Orleans Saints	Kareem Kelly	WR	USC	from Green Bay via Seattle (Note: No. 203: Green Bay → Seattle → New Orleans. Multiple trades: Green Bay → Seattle (D). See Round 5: Green Bay → Seattle. Seattle → New Orleans (D). Seattle traded a sixth-round selection (203rd overall) to New Orleans in exchange for DT Norman Hand.)
6	204	Oakland Raiders	Dustin Rykert	T	BYU	
6	205	Tampa Bay Buccaneers	Torrie Cox	CB	Pittsburgh	
6*	206	Chicago Bears	Brock Forsey	RB	Boise State	
6*	207	New York Giants	Frank Walker	CB	Tuskegee	
6*	208	Indianapolis Colts	Makoa Freitas	T	Arizona	
6*	209	Miami Dolphins	Tim Provost	T	San Jose State	
6*	210	Arizona Cardinals	Tony Gilbert	LB	Georgia	
6*	211	New York Giants	David Tyree ^{†}	WR	Syracuse	
6*	212	Green Bay Packers	Brennan Curtin	T	Notre Dame	
6*	213	Miami Dolphins	Yeremiah Bell ^{†}	S	Eastern Kentucky	
6¤	214	Houston Texans	Keith Wright	DT	Missouri	
7	215	Cincinnati Bengals	Scott Kooistra	T	NC State	
7	216	Detroit Lions	Ben Johnson	T	Wisconsin	
7	217	Houston Texans	Curry Burns	S	Louisville	
7	218	Jacksonville Jaguars	Malaefou MacKenzie	FB	USC	from Chicago Bears (Note: No. 218: Chicago → Jacksonville (D). See Round 5: Jacksonville → Chicago.)
7	219	Dallas Cowboys	Justin Bates	G	Colorado	
7	220	Detroit Lions	Blue Adams	CB	Cincinnati	from Arizona (Note: No. 220: Arizona → Detroit (D). Arizona traded a seventh-round selection (220th overall) to Detroit in exchange for WR Larry Foster.)
7	221	Minnesota Vikings	Keenan Howry	WR	Oregon	
7	222	Seattle Seahawks	Josh Brown ^{†}	K	Nebraska	from Jacksonville (Note: No. 222: Jacksonville → Seattle (PD). Jacksonville traded a seventh-round selection (222nd overall) to Seattle in exchange for LB Ike Charlton.)
7	223	Baltimore Ravens	Trent Smith	TE	Oklahoma	
7	224	Seattle Seahawks	Taco Wallace	WR	Kansas State	
7	225	Tennessee Titans	Todd Williams	T	Florida State	from St. Louis via New England (Note: No. 225: St. Louis → New England → Tennessee. Multiple trades: St. Louis → New England (PD). St. Louis traded a seventh-round selection (225th overall) to New England in exchange for OT Grant Williams. New England → Tennessee (D). See Round 5: New England → Tennessee.)
7	226	Carolina Panthers	Walter Young	WR	Illinois	from Washington via Miami (Note: No. 226: Washington → Miami → Carolina. Multiple trades: Washington → Miami (PD). Washington sent a seventh-round selection (226th overall) to Miami as compensation for signing restricted free agent DT Jermaine Haley. Miami → Carolina (D). See Round 6: Carolina → Miami.)
7	227	Denver Broncos	Clint Mitchell	DE	Florida	from Carolina (Note: No. 227: Carolina → Denver (D). See Round 3: Denver → Carolina.)
7	228	Buffalo Bills	Mario Haggan	LB	Mississippi State	
7	229	San Diego Chargers	Andrew Pinnock	FB	South Carolina	
7	230	Kansas City Chiefs	Montique Sharpe	DT	Wake Forest	
7	231	New Orleans Saints	Talman Gardner	WR	Florida State	
7	232	Washington Redskins	Gibran Hamdan	QB	Indiana	from Miami (Note: No. 232: Miami → Washington (PD). Miami traded a seventh-round selection (232nd overall) to Washington in exchange for QB Sage Rosenfels.)
7¤	233	Houston Texans	Chance Pearce	C	Texas A&M	
7	234	New England Patriots	Spencer Nead	FB	BYU	
7	235	Denver Broncos	Ahmaad Galloway	RB	Alabama	
7	236	Detroit Lions	Brandon Drumm	RB	Colorado	from Cleveland via San Diego and Dallas (Note: No. 236: Cleveland → San Diego → Dallas → Detroit. Multiple trades: Cleveland → San Diego (PD). Cleveland traded a seventh-round selection (236th overall) to San Diego in exchange for TE Steve Heiden. San Diego → Dallas (PD). San Diego traded a seventh-round selection (236th overall) to Dallas in exchange for OT Kelvin Garmon. Dallas → Detroit (D). Dallas traded a seventh-round selection (236th overall) to Detroit in exchange for RB Aveion Cason.)
7	237	New York Jets	Dave Yovanovits	G	Temple	
7	238	Atlanta Falcons	Demetrin Veal	DE	Tennessee	
7	239	New England Patriots	Tully Banta-Cain	LB	California	from Indianapolis via New Orleans (Note: No. 239: Indianapolis → New Orleans → New England. Multiple trades: Indianapolis → New Orleans (PD). Indianapolis traded a seventh-round selection (239th overall) to New Orleans in exchange for RB Ricky A. Williams. New Orleans → New England (D). See Round 3: New Orleans → New England.)
7	240	New York Giants	Charles Drake	S	Michigan	
7	241	San Francisco 49ers	Ken Dorsey	QB	Miami (FL)	
7	242	Pittsburgh Steelers	J. T. Wall	RB	Georgia	
7	243	New England Patriots	Ethan Kelley	DT	Baylor	from Tennessee (Note: No. 243: Tennessee → New England (D). See Round 5: New England → Tennessee.)
7	244	Philadelphia Eagles	Norman LeJeune	S	LSU	from Green Bay (Note: No. 244: Green Bay → Philadelphia (D). See Round 5: Philadelphia → Green Bay.)
7	245	Green Bay Packers	Chris Johnson	CB	Louisville	from Philadelphia (Note: No. 245: Philadelphia → Green Bay (D). Philadelphia traded a seventh-round selection (245th overall) to Green Bay in exchange for a 2004 sixth-round selection.)
7	246	Oakland Raiders	Siddeeq Shabazz	S	New Mexico State	
7	247	Carolina Panthers	Casey Moore	RB	Stanford	from Tampa Bay via Miami (Note: No. 247: Tampa Bay → Miami → Carolina. Multiple trades: Tampa Bay → Miami (D). Tampa Bay traded a seventh-round selection (247th overall) to Miami in exchange for OT Cornell Green. (Note: "Dolphins Trade Cornell Green To Tampa Bay". Miami Dolphins. August 20, 2002.) Miami → Carolina (D). See Round 6: Carolina → Miami.)
7*	248	Miami Dolphins	Davern Williams	DT	Troy State	
7*	249	New York Giants	Wayne Lucier	C	Colorado	
7*	250	Baltimore Ravens	Mike Mabry	C	UCF	
7*	251	St. Louis Rams	Scott Shanle	LB	Nebraska	
7*	252	Kansas City Chiefs	Willie Pile	S	Virginia Tech	
7*	253	Green Bay Packers	DeAndrew Rubin	WR	South Florida	
7*	254	St. Louis Rams	Richard Angulo	TE	Western New Mexico	
7*	255	New York Giants	Kevin Walter	WR	Eastern Michigan	
7*	256	Green Bay Packers	Carl Ford	WR	Toledo	
7*	257	Green Bay Packers	Steve Josue	LB	Carson–Newman	
7*	258	Baltimore Ravens	Antwoine Sanders	CB	Utah	
7^	259	Cincinnati Bengals	Elton Patterson	DE	UCF	
7^	260	Detroit Lions	Travis Anglin	WR	Memphis	
7^	261	Chicago Bears	Bryan Anderson	G	Pittsburgh	
7¤	262	Oakland Raiders	Ryan Hoag	WR	Gustavus Adolphus	from Houston Texans (Note: No. 262: Houston → Oakland (D). See Round 3: Houston → Oakland.)

== Trades ==
In the explanations below, (D) denotes trades that took place during the draft, while (PD) indicates trades completed pre-draft.

Round 1

Round 2

Round 3

Round 4

Round 5

Round 6

Round 7

== Supplemental draft selections ==
For each player selected in the supplemental draft, the team forfeited its pick in that round in the draft of the following season.

Rnd.	Pick	Team	Player	Pos.	College	Notes
2	—	Houston Texans	Tony Hollings	RB	Georgia Tech	

== Notable undrafted players ==
^{†}	Pro Bowler
‡	Hall of Famer

Original NFL team	Player	Pos.	College	Notes
Atlanta Falcons	Travaris Robinson	S	Auburn	
Baltimore Ravens	Todd Devoe	WR	Central Missouri State	
Buffalo Bills	Antonio Brown	WR	West Virginia	
Buffalo Bills	Jon Dorenbos ^{†}	LS	UTEP	
Buffalo Bills	Fred Jackson	RB	Coe	
Carolina Panthers	Vinny Ciurciu	LB	Boston College	
Chicago Bears	Cameron Worrell	S	Fresno State	
Cincinnati Bengals	Terrell Roberts	CB	Oregon State	
Cleveland Browns	Leigh Bodden	CB	Duquesne	
Cleveland Browns	Enoch DeMar	G	Indiana	
Cleveland Browns	Israel Idonije	DE	Manitoba	
Dallas Cowboys	Erik Bickerstaff	RB	Wisconsin	
Dallas Cowboys	Ryan Flinn	P	UCF	
Dallas Cowboys	ReShard Lee	RB	Middle Tennessee	
Dallas Cowboys	Keith O'Neil	LB	Northern Arizona	
Dallas Cowboys	Tony Romo ^{†}	QB	Eastern Illinois	
Dallas Cowboys	Shaun Smith	DE	South Carolina	
Dallas Cowboys	Torrin Tucker	T	Southern Miss	
Denver Broncos	Mat McBriar ^{†}	P	Hawaii	
Denver Broncos	Cecil Sapp	RB	Colorado State	
Detroit Lions	Casey FitzSimmons	TE	Carroll	
Green Bay Packers	Earl Cochran	DE	Alabama State	
Green Bay Packers	Cullen Jenkins	DE	Central Michigan	
Green Bay Packers	Shantee Orr	LB	Michigan	
Green Bay Packers	Scottie Vines	WR	Wyoming	
Indianapolis Colts	Gary Brackett	LB	Rutgers	
Indianapolis Colts	Anthony Floyd	S	Louisville	
Indianapolis Colts	Tom Lopienski	FB	Notre Dame	
Indianapolis Colts	Aaron Moorehead	WR	Illinois	
Jacksonville Jaguars	Cortez Hankton	WR	Texas Southern	
Jacksonville Jaguars	Seth Marler	K	Tulane	
Minnesota Vikings	Colin Cole	DT	Iowa	
Minnesota Vikings	Adam Goldberg	T	Wyoming	
Minnesota Vikings	Ben Nelson	WR	St. Cloud State	
New Orleans Saints	Kenderick Allen	DT	LSU	
New York Jets	Mark Brown	LB	Auburn	
Philadelphia Eagles	Alonzo Ephraim	C	Alabama	
Philadelphia Eagles	Roderick Hood	CB	Auburn	
Philadelphia Eagles	Jamaal Jackson	C	Delaware State	
Philadelphia Eagles	Derrick Frost	P	Northern Iowa	
Philadelphia Eagles	Greg Lewis	WR	Illinois	
Philadelphia Eagles	Reno Mahe	WR	BYU	
Philadelphia Eagles	Quintin Mikell ^{†}	S	Boise State	
Philadelphia Eagles	Sam Rayburn	DT	Tulsa	
Pittsburgh Steelers	Russell Stuvaints	S	Youngstown State	
San Diego Chargers	Phil Bogle	G	New Haven	
San Diego Chargers	Jacques Cesaire	DE	Southern Connecticut	
San Diego Chargers	Stephen Cooper	LB	Maine	
San Diego Chargers	Kris Dielman ^{†}	G	Indiana	
San Diego Chargers	Antonio Gates^{‡}^{†}	TE	Kent State	Played college basketball
San Diego Chargers	Kassim Osgood ^{†}	WR	San Diego State	
San Francisco 49ers	Joselio Hanson	CB	Texas Tech	
San Francisco 49ers	Ray Wells	LB	Arizona	
Seattle Seahawks	Jerheme Urban	WR	Trinity (TX)	
Tampa Bay Buccaneers	Earnest Graham	RB	Florida	
Tampa Bay Buccaneers	Will Heller	TE	Georgia Tech	
Washington Redskins	Chris Clemons	DE	Georgia	
Washington Redskins	Kevin Ware	TE	Washington	

== Hall of Famers ==
- Troy Polamalu, strong safety from USC, taken 1st round 16th overall by the Pittsburgh Steelers.

Inducted: Professional Football Hall of Fame Class of 2020

- Andre Johnson, wide receiver from Miami (FL), taken 1st round 3rd overall by the Houston Texans.

Inducted: Professional Football Hall of Fame Class of 2024.

- Antonio Gates, tight end from Kent State, undrafted.

Inducted: Professional Football Hall of Fame Class of 2025.
