= 2003 Oakland Raiders season =

NFL team season

- Owner: Al Davis
- General manager: Al Davis
- Head coach: Bill Callahan
- Home stadium: Network Associates Coliseum

Results
- Record: 4–12
- Division place: 3rd AFC West
- Playoffs: Did not qualify
- Pro Bowlers: None

The 2003 Oakland Raiders season was the 44th season of professional football for the Oakland Raiders franchise, their 34th season as members of the National Football League (NFL), and their ninth season since returning to Oakland. They were led by head coach Bill Callahan in his second and final year as head coach of the Raiders. The Raiders played their home games at Network Associates Coliseum as members of the AFC West. They finished the season 4–12 to finish in a tie with the Chargers for last place, but the Raiders finished in 3rd place because they had a better conference record than the Chargers did. It marked the first time since 1999 that the Raiders failed to make the playoffs and finished with a losing record for the first time since 1997.

Quarterback Rich Gannon, who had been the league MVP the previous season, injured his shoulder in seventh game of the season and was put on injured reserve for the remainder of the season. He was replaced by Marques Tuiasosopo and Rick Mirer. The Raiders had a five-game losing streak in the middle of the season and lost seven games by a touchdown or less. Their 4–12 record tied them with the San Diego Chargers, New York Giants, and Arizona Cardinals as the worst team in football in 2003 and they received the second pick in the 2004 NFL draft.

The season was the last year in Oakland for wide receivers Tim Brown and Jerry Rice. Both future Hall of Fame members were held to four total touchdowns for the season.

Following the season, Raiders owner Al Davis fired head coach Bill Callahan and replaced him with Norv Turner.

The 2003 season marked a turning point in Oakland/Las Vegas Raiders history, as it started a long period of futility and decline for the team. From 2003 to present, the Raiders only made the playoffs twice in 2016 and 2021 with only 5 seasons with a .500 or better record in the same timespan.

In Week 13, after a 22-8 loss to the Denver Broncos, head coach Bill Callahan stated "We've got to be the dumbest team in America in terms of playing the game. I'm highly critical because of the way we give games away. We give 'em away! Period. It's embarrassing, and I represent that. And I apologize for that, but that’s the best we can do, and that’s a sad product.”

== Previous season ==
The Raiders finished the 2002 season 11–5 to win the AFC West. As the No. 1 seed in the AFC playoffs, they defeated the Jets and Titans to advance to their first Super Bowl since 1984, where they were defeated by the Buccaneers who were led by former Raider head coach Jon Gruden.

== Offseason ==
The Raiders lost defensive tackle Sam Adams, cornerback Tory James, defensive end Regan Upshaw and fullback Jon Ritchie in free agency.

=== NFL draft ===
2003 Oakland Raiders draft
Round	Pick	Player	Position	College	Notes
1	31	Nnamdi Asomugha *	CB	California	
1	32	Tyler Brayton	DE	Colorado	
2	63	Teyo Johnson	TE	Stanford	
3	83	Sam Williams	LB	Fresno State	
3	96	Justin Fargas	RB	USC	
4	129	Shurron Pierson	DE	South Florida	
5	167	Doug Gabriel	WR	UCF	
6	204	Dustin Rykert	OT	BYU	
7	246	Siddeeq Shabazz	SS	New Mexico State	
7	262	Ryan Hoag	WR	Gustavus Adolphus	
Made roster † Pro Football Hall of Fame * Made at least one Pro Bowl during career

== Staff ==
2003 Oakland Raiders staff
Head coaches: Head coach – Bill Callahan; Offensive coaches: Offensive coordinator – Marc Trestman; Running backs – Skip Peete; Wide receivers – Fred Biletnikoff; Tight ends – Jay Norvell; Offensive line – Aaron Kromer; Senior assistant – John Morton; Offensive assistant – Jim Harbaugh; Offensive assistant – Chris Turner	Defensive coaches: Defensive coordinator – Chuck Bresnahan; Defensive line – Mike Waufle; Linebackers – Fred Pagac; Defensive backs – Ron Lynn; Quality control/defense – Chris Griswold; Quality control/defense – Don Martin; Squad development – Willie Brown; Special teams coaches: Special teams coordinator – Bob Casullo; Strength and conditioning: Strength and conditioning – Tim Adams

== Roster ==
2003 Oakland Raiders roster
Quarterbacks: 7 Rob Johnson; 17 Tee Martin; 3 Rick Mirer; Running backs: 32 Zack Crockett FB; 25 Charlie Garner; 44 Chris Hetherington FB; 27 J. R. Redmond; 47 Tyrone Wheatley; Wide receivers: 81 Tim Brown; 89 Ronald Curry; 85 Doug Gabriel KR; 84 Jerry Porter; 80 Jerry Rice; 86 John Stone; 87 Alvis Whitted; Tight ends: 82 Teyo Johnson; 88 Doug Jolley; 83 O. J. Santiago	Offensive linemen: 70 Brad Badger G; 71 Corey Hulsey G; 72 Lincoln Kennedy T; 63 Barret Robbins C; 60 Blaine Saipaia C/G; 65 Barry Sims T; 78 Chad Slaughter G/T; 62 Adam Treu C; 66 Langston Walker G/T; 77 Joe Wong G/T; Defensive linemen: 91 Tyler Brayton DE; 95 Lorenzo Bromell DE; 57 Rod Coleman DT; 75 Chris Cooper DT; 98 Akbar Gbaja-Biamila DE; 90 Sean Gilbert DT; 99 DeLawrence Grant DE; 96 Grant Irons DE; 92 Terdell Sands DT; 94 Dana Stubblefield DT	Linebackers: 50 Eric Barton OLB; 58 Napoleon Harris OLB; 51 Tim Johnson MLB; 55 Shurron Pierson OLB; Defensive backs: 21 Nnamdi Asomugha CB/FS; 31 Phillip Buchanon CB/PR; 33 Anthony Dorsett FS/SS; 36 Derrick Gibson SS; 41 Eric Johnson SS; 38 Clarence Love CB; 37 Carey Scott CB/S; 22 Terrance Shaw CB; 24 Charles Woodson CB; Special teams: 11 Sebastian Janikowski; 9 Shane Lechler	Injured Reserve: 93 Trace Armstrong DE (IR); 73 Mo Collins G (IR); 20 Justin Fargas RB/KR (IR); 12 Rich Gannon QB (IR); 79 Frank Middleton G (IR); -- Scottie Montgomery WR (IR); 42 Keyon Nash S (IR); 97 John Parrella DT (IR); 53 Bill Romanowski LB (IR); 56 Travian Smith LB (IR); 74 Matt Stinchcomb T (IR); 8 Marques Tuiasosopo QB (IR); 54 Sam Williams LB (IR); 26 Rod Woodson FS (IR); Practice squad: 48 James Adkisson TE; 28 Keith Burnell RB; 52 Donny Green LB; 49 David Newman TE; 76 Jared Peck T; rookies in italics 53 active, 14 inactive, 5 practice squad

== Regular season ==
=== Schedule ===
Week	Date	Opponent	Result	Record	Venue	Attendance
1	September 7	at Tennessee Titans	L 20–25	0–1	The Coliseum	68,809
2	September 14	Cincinnati Bengals	W 23–20	1–1	Network Associates Coliseum	50,135
3	September 22	at Denver Broncos	L 10–31	1–2	Invesco Field at Mile High	76,753
4	September 28	San Diego Chargers	W 34–31 (OT)	2–2	Network Associates Coliseum	54,078
5	October 5	at Chicago Bears	L 21–24	2–3	Soldier Field	61,099
6	October 12	at Cleveland Browns	L 7–13	2–4	Cleveland Browns Stadium	73,318
7	October 20	Kansas City Chiefs	L 10–17	2–5	Network Associates Coliseum	62,391
8	Bye					
9	November 2	at Detroit Lions	L 13–23	2–6	Ford Field	61,561
10	November 9	New York Jets	L 24–27 (OT)	2–7	Network Associates Coliseum	51,909
11	November 16	Minnesota Vikings	W 28–18	3–7	Network Associates Coliseum	56,653
12	November 23	at Kansas City Chiefs	L 24–27	3–8	Arrowhead Stadium	78,889
13	November 30	Denver Broncos	L 8–22	3–9	Network Associates Coliseum	57,201
14	December 7	at Pittsburgh Steelers	L 7–27	3–10	Heinz Field	53,079
15	December 14	Baltimore Ravens	W 20–12	4–10	Network Associates Coliseum	45,398
16	December 22	Green Bay Packers	L 7–41	4–11	Network Associates Coliseum	62,298
17	December 28	at San Diego Chargers	L 14–21	4–12	Qualcomm Stadium	62,222

=== Standings ===
AFC West
	W	L	T	PCT	DIV	CONF	PF	PA	STK
^{(2)} Kansas City Chiefs	13	3	0	.813	5–1	10–2	484	332	W1
^{(6)} Denver Broncos	10	6	0	.625	5–1	9–3	381	301	L1
Oakland Raiders	4	12	0	.250	1–5	3–9	270	379	L2
San Diego Chargers	4	12	0	.250	1–5	2–10	313	441	W1

== Game summaries ==
=== Week 1: at Tennessee Titans ===
Week 1: Oakland Raiders at Tennessee Titans – Game summary

Quarter	1	2	3	4	Total
Raiders	3	7	0	10	20
Titans	6	6	3	10	25

at The Coliseum, Nashville, Tennessee

- Date: September 7
- Game time: 5:30 p.m. PDT/7:30 p.m. CDT
- Game weather: Partly cloudy, 75 °F (24 °C)
- Game attendance: 68,809
- Referee: Ron Blum
- TV announcers (ESPN): Mike Patrick, Joe Theismann, Paul Maguire, and Suzy Kolber
- Box score

Game information

First quarter

- TEN – Tyrone Calico 11-yard pass from Steve McNair (kick failed), 6:47. Titans 6–0. Drive: 7 plays, 90 yards, 4:18.
- OAK – Sebastian Janikowski 47-yard field goal, 1:29. Titans 6–3. Drive: 4 plays, 4 yards, 2:53.

Second quarter

- TEN – Joe Nedney 50-yard field goal, 8:32. Titans 9–3. Drive: 8 plays, 19 yards, 4:06.
- OAK – Charlie Garner 46-yard pass from Rich Gannon (Sebastian Janikowski kick), 1:06. Raiders 10–9. Drive: 7 plays, 76 yards, 2:49.
- TEN – Craig Hentrich 49-yard field goal, 0:00. Titans 12–10. Drive: 5 plays, 41 yards, 1:06.

Third quarter

- TEN – Craig Hentrich 34-yard field goal, 2:52. Titans 15–10. Drive: 11 plays, 64 yards, 5:09.

Fourth quarter

- OAK – Sebastian Janikowski 47-yard field goal, 13:51. Titans 15–13. Drive: 9 plays, 39 yards, 4:01.
- TEN – Derrick Mason 3-yard pass from Steve McNair (Craig Hentrich kick), 7:51. Titans 22–13. Drive: 7 plays, 54 yards, 4:06.
- OAK – Tim Brown 25-yard pass from Rich Gannon (Sebastian Janikowski kick), 3:30. Titans 22–20. Drive: 5 plays, 65 yards, 1:27.
- TEN – Craig Hentrich 33-yard field goal, 0:32. Titans 25–20. Drive: 7 plays, 54 yards, 2:58.

Top passers

- OAK – Rich Gannon – 24/38, 264 yards, 2 TD
- TEN – Steve McNair – 25/38, 269 yards, 2 TD, INT

Top rushers

- OAK – Charlie Garner – 7 rushes, 22 yards
- TEN – Eddie George – 20 rushes, 42 yards

Top receivers

- OAK – Charlie Garner – 8 receptions, 112 yards, TD
- TEN – Derrick Mason – 10 receptions, 99 yards, TD

=== Week 2: vs. Cincinnati Bengals ===
Week 2: Cincinnati Bengals at Oakland Raiders – Game summary

Quarter	1	2	3	4	Total
Bengals	3	7	3	7	20
Raiders	10	0	3	10	23

at Network Associates Coliseum, Oakland, California

- Date: September 14
- Game time: 1:15 p.m. PDT/4:15 p.m. EDT
- Game weather: 80 °F (27 °C)
- Game attendance: 50,135
- Referee: Ed Hochuli
- TV announcers (CBS): Bill Macatee, Jerry Glanville
- Box score

Game information

First quarter

- OAK – Sebastian Janikowski 40-yard field goal, 12:12. Raiders 3–0. Drive: 4 plays, 8 yards, 1:20.
- OAK – Tyrone Wheatley 2-yard run (Sebastian Janikowski kick), 9:27. Raiders 10–0. Drive: 4 plays, 68 yards, 1:54.
- CIN – Shayne Graham 31-yard field goal, 5:14. Raiders 10–3. Drive: 9 plays, 68 yards, 4:13.

Second quarter

- CIN – Corey Dillon 1-yard run (Shayne Graham kick), 11:46. Tied 10–10. Drive: 14 plays, 84 yards, 7:20.

Third quarter

- OAK – Sebastian Janikowski 26-yard field goal, 8:18. Raiders 13–10. Drive: 7 plays, 38 yards, 3:28.
- CIN – Shayne Graham 22-yard field goal, 0:30. Tied 13–13. Drive: 16 plays, 70 yards, 7:48.

Fourth quarter

- OAK – Phillip Buchanon 83-yard interception return (Sebastian Janikowski kick), 3:46. Raiders 20–13.
- CIN – Peter Warrick 8-yard pass from Jon Kitna (Shayne Graham kick), 1:18. Tied 20–20. Drive: 6 plays, 53 yards, 2:28.
- OAK – Sebastian Janikowski 39-yard field goal, 0:09. Raiders 23–20. Drive: 8 plays, 55 yards, 1:09.

Top passers

- CIN – Jon Kitna – 25/41, 303 yards, TD, 2 INT
- OAK – Rich Gannon – 13/28, 103 yards

Top rushers

- CIN – Corey Dillon – 19 rushes, 84 yards, TD
- OAK – Charlie Garner – 13 rushes, 63 yards

Top receivers

- CIN – Chad Johnson – 8 receptions, 131 yards
- OAK – Jerry Rice – 4 receptions, 40 yards

=== Week 3: at Denver Broncos ===
Week 3: Oakland Raiders at Denver Broncos – Game summary

Quarter	1	2	3	4	Total
Raiders	0	0	7	3	10
Broncos	21	3	7	0	31

at Invesco Field at Mile High, Denver, Colorado

- Date: September 22
- Game time: 6:00 p.m. PDT/7:00 p.m. MDT
- Game weather: Clear, 72 °F (22 °C)
- Game attendance: 76,753
- Referee: Larry Nemmers
- TV announcers (ABC): Al Michaels, John Madden, and Lisa Guerrero
- Box score

Game information

First quarter

- DEN – Shannon Sharpe 18-yard pass from Jake Plummer (Jason Elam kick), 9:28. Broncos 7–0. Drive: 7 plays, 60 yards, 4:03.
- DEN – Ashley Lelie 44-yard pass from Jake Plummer (Jason Elam kick), 4:14. Broncos 14–0. Drive: 6 plays, 55 yards, 2:51.
- DEN – Jake Plummer 6-yard run (Jason Elam kick), 0:54. Broncos 21–0. Drive: 4 plays, 50 yards, 2:23.

Second quarter

- DEN – Jason Elam 20-yard field goal, 2:28. Broncos 24–0. Drive: 12 plays, 78 yards, 6:14.

Third quarter

- DEN – Mike Anderson 1-yard run (Jason Elam kick), 12:11. Broncos 31–0. Drive: 6 plays, 80 yards, 2:49.
- OAK – Zack Crockett 4-yard run (Sebastian Janikowski kick), 5:21. Broncos 31–7. Drive: 13 plays, 80 yards, 6:50.

Fourth quarter

- OAK – Sebastian Janikowski 41-yard field goal, 12:26. Broncos 31–10. Drive: 4 plays, -2 yards, 0:53.

Top passers

- OAK – Rich Gannon – 14/29, 149 yards
- DEN – Jake Plummer – 14/21, 197 yards, 2 TD

Top rushers

- OAK – Tyrone Wheatley – 5 rushes, 16 yards
- DEN – Mike Anderson – 14 rushes, 70 yards, TD

Top receivers

- OAK – Jerry Rice – 4 receptions, 61 yards
- DEN – Ashley Lelie – 3 receptions, 108 yards, TD

=== Week 4: vs. San Diego Chargers ===
Week 4: San Diego Chargers at Oakland Raiders – Game summary

Quarter	1	2	3	4	OT	Total
Chargers	7	14	3	7	0	31
Raiders	7	7	0	17	3	34

at Network Associates Coliseum, Oakland, California

- Date: September 29
- Game time: 1:05 p.m. PDT
- Game weather: Partly cloudy, 63 °F (17 °C)
- Game attendance: 54,078
- Referee: Peter Morelli
- TV announcers (CBS): Dick Enberg, Dan Dierdorf, and Bonnie Bernstein
- Box score

Game information

First quarter

- OAK – Tim Brown 36-yard pass from Rich Gannon (Sebastian Janikowski kick), 11:26. Raiders 7–0. Drive: 7 plays, 78 yards, 3:34.
- SDG – Drew Brees 21-yard pass from LaDainian Tomlinson (Steve Christie kick), 6:46. Tied 7–7. Drive: 8 plays, 71 yards, 4:40.

Second quarter

- SDG – Justin Peelle 7-yard pass from Drew Brees (Steve Christie kick), 13:19. Chargers 14–7. Drive: 3 plays, 18 yards, 1:29.
- OAK – Doug Jolley 2-yard pass from Rich Gannon (Sebastian Janikowski kick), 8:14. Tied 14–14. Drive: 11 plays, 92 yards, 5:05.
- SDG – LaDainian Tomlinson 55-yard run (Steve Christie kick), 6:44. Chargers 21–14. Drive: 3 plays, 74 yards, 1:30.

Third quarter

- SDG – Steve Christie 32-yard field goal, 10:41. Chargers 24–14. Drive: 8 plays, 20 yards, 4:19.

Fourth quarter

- OAK – Sebastian Janikowski 23-yard field goal, 9:29. Chargers 24–17. Drive: 16 plays, 75 yards, 7:05.
- SDG – Lorenzo Neal 3-yard run (Steve Christie kick), 5:59. Chargers 31–17. Drive: 7 plays, 66 yards, 3:30.
- OAK – Alvis Whitted 36-yard pass from Rich Gannon (Sebastian Janikowski kick), 4:38. Chargers 31–24. Drive: 4 plays, 60 yards, 1:21.
- OAK – Charlie Garner 24-yard run (Sebastian Janikowski kick), 1:24. Tied 31–31. Drive: 5 plays, 64 yards, 1:27.

Overtime

- OAK – Sebastian Janikowski 46-yard field goal, 5:01. Raiders 34–31. Drive: 9 plays, 64 yards, 4:44.

Top passers

- SDG – Drew Brees – 21/31, 187 yards, TD, INT
- OAK – Rich Gannon – 26/43, 348 yards, 3 TD, INT

Top rushers

- SDG – LaDainian Tomlinson – 28 rushes, 187 yards, TD
- OAK – Charlie Garner – 12 rushes, 70 yards, TD

Top receivers

- SDG – Dondre Gilliam – 4 receptions, 67 yards
- OAK – Jerry Rice – 7 receptions, 126 yards

The Chargers jumped out to a 31–17 lead with just under 6 minutes left in regulation, but the Raiders scored 17 unanswered points to tie the game with 1:24 left in the 4th quarter. San Diego started the following drive at its own 20-yard line and made it to the Oakland 32-yard line, but ran out of time before being able to score, and the game went into overtime. The Chargers received the opening kickoff in overtime, but only gained 12 yards before punting. The two teams would trade punts before Oakland kicker Sebastian Janikowski made a 46-yard field goal to win the game for the Raiders.

=== Week 5: at Chicago Bears ===
Week 5: Oakland Raiders at Chicago Bears – Game summary

Quarter	1	2	3	4	Total
Raiders	6	12	0	3	21
Bears	0	3	3	18	24

at Soldier Field, Chicago, Illinois

- Date: October 5
- Game time: 10:00 a.m. PDT/12:00 p.m. CDT
- Game weather: 58 °F (14 °C)
- Game attendance: 61,099
- Referee: Walt Anderson
- TV announcers (CBS): Dick Enberg, Dan Dierdorf, and Bonnie Bernstein
- Box score

=== Week 6: at Cleveland Browns ===
Week 6: Oakland Raiders at Cleveland Browns – Game summary

Quarter	1	2	3	4	Total
Raiders	7	0	0	0	7
Browns	0	3	7	3	13

at Cleveland Browns Stadium, Cleveland, Ohio

- Date: October 12
- Game time: 10:00 a.m. PDT/1:00 p.m. EDT
- Game weather: Sunny, 62 °F (17 °C)
- Game attendance: 73,318
- Referee: Johnny Grier
- TV announcers (CBS): Kevin Harlan, Randy Cross
- Box score

=== Week 7: vs. Kansas City ===
Week 7: Kansas City Chiefs at Oakland Raiders – Game summary

Quarter	1	2	3	4	Total
Chiefs	7	3	0	7	17
Raiders	0	0	0	10	10

at Network Associates Coliseum, Oakland, California

- Date: October 20
- Game time: 6:00 p.m. PDT
- Game weather: Sunny, 75 °F (24 °C)
- Game attendance: 62,391
- Referee: Mike Carey
- TV announcers (ABC): Al Michaels, John Madden, and Lisa Guerrero
- Box score

Game information

First quarter

- KC – Trent Green 2-yard run (Morten Andersen kick), 4:16. Chiefs 7–0. Drive: 3 plays, 44 yards, 1:18.

Second quarter

- KC – Morten Andersen 37-yard field goal, 1:07. Chiefs 10–0. Drive: 7 plays, 55 yards, 3:19.

Third quarter

- No scoring plays.

Fourth quarter

- OAK – Sebastian Janikowski 27-yard field goal, 8:06. Chiefs 10–3. Drive: 13 plays, 80 yards, 5:49.
- KC – Priest Holmes 2-yard run (Morten Andersen kick), 4:57. Chiefs 17–3. Drive: 3 plays, 11 yards, 1:24.
- OAK – Zack Crockett 1-yard run (Sebastian Janikowski kick), 2:25. Chiefs 17–10. Drive: 7 plays, 65 yards, 2:32.

Top passers

- KC – Trent Green – 11/22, 206 yards, INT
- OAK – Marques Tuiasosopo – 16/28, 224 yards, INT

Top rushers

- KC – Priest Holmes – 27 rushes, 123 yards, TD
- OAK – Charlie Garner – 10 rushes, 32 yards

Top receivers

- KC – Tony Gonzalez – 3 receptions, 87 yards
- OAK – Charlie Garner – 8 receptions, 71 yards

=== Week 9: at Detroit Lions ===
Week 9: Oakland Raiders at Detroit Lions – Game summary

Quarter	1	2	3	4	Total
Raiders	0	3	7	3	13
Lions	10	0	7	6	23

at Ford Field, Detroit, Michigan

- Date: November 2
- Game time: 10:00 a.m. PST/1:00 p.m. EST
- Game weather: None (played indoors)
- Game attendance: 61,561
- Referee: Jeff Triplette
- TV announcers (CBS): Kevin Harlan, Randy Cross, Marcus Allen
- Box score

Game information

First quarter

- DET – Jason Hanson 54-yard field goal, 12:54. Lions 3–0 Drive: 4 plays, 8 yards, 1:26.
- DET – Olandis Gary 2-yard run (Jason Hanson kick good), 0:58. Lions 10–0 Drive: 4 plays, 12 yards, 1:26.

Second quarter

- OAK – Sebastian Janikowski 55-yard field goal, 0:00. Lions 10–3 Drive: 13 plays, 48 yards, 1:51.

Third quarter

- DET – Cory Schlesinger 33-yard pass from Joey Harrington (Jason Hanson kick good), 11:06. Lions 17–3 Drive: 7 plays, 66 yards, 3:54.
- OAK – Charlie Garner 7-yard run (Sebastian Janikowski kick good), 2:55. Lions 17–10 Drive: 14 plays, 79 yards, 8:11.

Fourth quarter

- DET – Jason Hanson 42-yard field goal, 12:45. Lions 20–10 Drive: 11 plays, 44 yards, 5:10.
- OAK – Sebastian Janikowski 24-yard field goal, 9:14. Lions 20–13 Drive: 4 plays, 3 yards, 0:52.
- DET – Jason Hanson 39-yard field goal, 5:52. Lions 23–13 Drive: 6 plays, 16 yards, 3:22.

Top passers

- OAK – Rick Mirer – 15/28, 125 yards, 2 INT
- DET – Joey Harrington – 13/21, 117 yards, TD, INT

Top receivers

- OAK – Jerry Rice – 8 receptions, 71 yards
- DET – Cory Schlesinger – 4 receptions, 53 yards, TD

Top rushers

- OAK – Charlie Garner – 15 rushes, 66 yards, TD
- DET – Shawn Bryson – 12 rushes, 53 yards

=== Week 10: vs. New York Jets ===
Week 10: New York Jets at Oakland Raiders – Game summary

Quarter	1	2	3	4	OT	Total
Jets	7	3	0	14	3	27
Raiders	7	14	0	3	0	24

at Network Associates Coliseum, Oakland, California

- Date: November 9
- Game time: 1:15 p.m. PST
- Game weather: Cloudy, 61 °F (16 °C)
- Game attendance: 51,909
- Referee: Tony Corrente
- TV announcers (CBS): Gus Johnson, Brent Jones
- Box score

=== Week 11: vs. Minnesota Vikings ===
Week 11: Minnesota Vikings at Oakland Raiders – Game summary

Quarter	1	2	3	4	Total
Vikings	0	3	7	8	18
Raiders	7	7	7	7	28

at Network Associates Coliseum, Oakland, California

- Date: November 16
- Game time: 1:15 p.m. PST
- Game weather: Mostly cloudy, 55 °F (13 °C)
- Game attendance: 56,653
- Referee: Bill Leavy
- TV announcers (FOX): Sam Rosen, Bill Maas, Chris Meyers
- Box score

Game information

First quarter

- OAK – Phillip Buchanon 64-yard interception return (Sebastian Janikowski kick), 14:11. Raiders 7–0.

Second quarter

- MIN – Aaron Elling 35-yard field goal, 11:24. Raiders 7–3. Drive: 9 plays, 54 yards, 3:43.
- OAK – Zack Crockett 1-yard run (Sebastian Janikowski kick), 8:22. Raiders 14–3. Drive: 1 play, 1 yard, 0:07.

Third quarter

- OAK – Tyrone Wheatley 2-yard run (Sebastian Janikowski kick), 11:23. Raiders 21–3. Drive: 7 plays, 74 yards, 3:37.
- MIN – Daunte Culpepper 11-yard run (Aaron Elling kick), 2:12. Raiders 21–10. Drive: 4 plays, 70 yards, 1:52.

Fourth quarter

- MIN – Kelly Campbell 29-yard pass from Daunte Culpepper (Daunte Culpepper pass to Hunter Goodwin), 8:32. Raiders 21–18. Drive: 2 plays, 81 yards, 0:44.
- OAK – Zack Crockett 2-yard run (Sebastian Janikowski kick), 2:16. Raiders 28–18. Drive: 4 plays, 11 yards, 0:30.

Top passers

- MIN – Daunte Culpepper – 27/49, 396 yards, TD, 3 INT
- OAK – Rick Mirer – 9/13, 195 yards

Top rushers

- MIN – Daunte Culpepper – 7 rushes, 42 yards, TD
- OAK – Tyrone Wheatley – 32 rushes, 109 yards, TD

Top receivers

- MIN – Kelly Campbell – 4 receptions, 115 yards, TD
- OAK – O. J. Santiago – 2 receptions, 53 yards

=== Week 12: at Kansas City Chiefs ===
Week 12: Oakland Raiders at Kansas City Chiefs – Game summary

Quarter	1	2	3	4	Total
Raiders	0	7	7	10	24
Chiefs	14	7	3	3	27

at Arrowhead Stadium, Kansas City, Missouri

- Date: November 23
- Game time: 1:15 p.m. PST/3:15 p.m. CST
- Game weather: Overcast, 30 °F (−1 °C)
- Game attendance: 78,889
- Referee: Larry Nemmers
- TV announcers (CBS): Greg Gumbel, Phil Simms, and Armen Keteyian
- Box score

Game information

First quarter

- KC – Derrick Blaylock 25-yard run (Morten Andersen kick), 9:05. Chiefs 7–0. Drive: 5 plays, 84 yards, 2:47.
- KC – Priest Holmes 2-yard run (Morten Andersen kick), 0:28. Chiefs 14–0. Drive: 6 plays, 68 yards, 2:47.

Second quarter

- OAK – Rick Mirer 13-yard run (Sebastian Janikowski kick), 1:50. Chiefs 14–7. Drive: 9 plays, 65 yards, 3:31.
- KC – Jason Dunn 2-yard pass from Trent Green (Morten Andersen kick), 0:22. Chiefs 21–7. Drive: 8 plays, 69 yards, 1:28.

Third quarter

- OAK – Tyrone Wheatley 15-yard run (Sebastian Janikowski kick), 10:19. Chiefs 21–14. Drive: 9 plays, 70 yards, 4:41.
- KC – Morten Andersen 43-yard field goal, 7:12. Chiefs 24–14. Drive: 5 plays, 23 yards, 3:07.

Fourth quarter

- OAK – Jerry Rice 47-yard pass from Rick Mirer (Sebastian Janikowski kick), 14:26. Chiefs 24–21. Drive: 6 plays, 77 yards, 2:31.
- OAK – Sebastian Janikowski 41-yard field goal, 2:18. Tied 24–24. Drive: 7 plays, 18 yards, 1:33.
- KC – Morten Andersen 35-yard field goal, 0:04. Chiefs 27–24. Drive: 8 plays, 38 yards, 2:14.

Top passers

- OAK – Rick Mirer – 19/31, 219 yards, TD
- KC – Trent Green – 23/33, 244 yards, TD

Top rushers

- OAK – Tyrone Wheatley – 19 rushes, 77 yards, TD
- KC – Priest Holmes – 21 rushes, 91 yards, TD

Top receivers

- OAK – Jerry Porter – 7 receptions, 89 yards
- KC – Priest Holmes – 6 receptions, 100 yards

=== Week 13: vs. Denver Broncos ===
Week 13: Denver Broncos at Oakland Raiders – Game summary

Quarter	1	2	3	4	Total
Broncos	0	14	0	8	22
Raiders	5	3	0	0	8

at Network Associates Coliseum, Oakland, California

- Date: November 30
- Game time: 1:15 p.m. PST
- Game weather: Light rain, 55 °F (13 °C)
- Game attendance: 57,201
- Referee: Ron Blum
- TV announcers (CBS): Kevin Harlan and Randy Cross
- Box score

Game information

First quarter

- OAK – Punt blocked by O. J. Santiago out of bounds in the end zone for a safety, 7:49. Raiders 2–0
- OAK – Sebastian Janikowski 46-yard field goal, 4:36. Raiders 5–0. Drive: 8 plays, 34 yards, 3:13.

Second quarter

- DEN – Shannon Sharpe 4-yard pass from Jake Plummer (Jason Elam kick), 11:00. Broncos 7–5. Drive: 13 plays, 65 yards, 8:36.
- OAK – Sebastian Janikowski 48-yard field goal, 9:03. Raiders 8–7. Drive: 5 plays, 47 yards, 1:57.
- DEN – Clinton Portis 1-yard run (Jason Elam kick), 4:24. Broncos 14–8. Drive: 9 plays, 60 yards, 4:39.

Third quarter

- No scoring plays

Fourth quarter

- DEN – Clinton Portis 1-yard run (Clinton Portis run), 3:15. Broncos 22–8. Drive: 10 plays, 68 yards, 6:04.

Top passers

- DEN – Jake Plummer – 11/20, 105 yards, TD, INT
- OAK – Rick Mirer – 13/30, 153 yards

Top rushers

- DEN – Clinton Portis – 34 rushes, 170 yards, 2 TD
- OAK – Tyrone Wheatley – 8 rushes, 85 yards

Top receivers

- DEN – Ed McCaffrey – 4 receptions, 39 yards
- OAK – Jerry Porter – 3 receptions, 49 yards

=== Week 14: at Pittsburgh Steelers ===
Week 14: Oakland Raiders at Pittsburgh Steelers – Game summary

Quarter	1	2	3	4	Total
Raiders	7	0	0	0	7
Steelers	0	17	7	3	27

at Heinz Field, Pittsburgh, Pennsylvania

- Date: December 7
- Game time: 10:00 a.m. PST/1:00 p.m. EST
- Game weather: Partly cloudy, 30 °F (−1 °C)
- Game attendance: 53,079
- Referee: Johnny Grier
- TV announcers (CBS): Gus Johnson and Brent Jones
- Box score

=== Week 15: vs. Baltimore Ravens ===
Week 15: Baltimore Ravens at Oakland Raiders – Game summary

Quarter	1	2	3	4	Total
Ravens	3	3	6	0	12
Raiders	10	7	0	3	20

at Network Associates Coliseum, Oakland, California

- Date: December 14
- Game time: 1:05 p.m. PST
- Game weather: Partly cloudy, 55 °F (13 °C)
- Game attendance: 45,398
- Referee: Ed Hochuli
- TV announcers (CBS): Ian Eagle, Solomon Wilcots
- Box score

=== Week 16: vs. Green Bay Packers ===
Week 16: Green Bay Packers at Oakland Raiders – Game summary

Quarter	1	2	3	4	Total
Packers	14	17	3	7	41
Raiders	7	0	0	0	7

at Network Associates Coliseum, Oakland, California

- Date: December 22
- Game time: 6:00 p.m. PST
- Game weather: Clear, 54 °F (12 °C)
- Game attendance: 62,298
- Referee: Tony Corrente
- TV announcers (ABC): Al Michaels, John Madden, and Lisa Guerrero
- Box score

The day before the game, Irvin Favre, father of Packers' quarterback Brett Favre, died suddenly of a heart attack. Favre elected to play and passed for four touchdowns in the first half, and 399 yards in a 41–7 defeat of the Raiders. Afterwards, Favre said, "I knew that my dad would have wanted me to play. I love him so much and I love this game. It's meant a great deal to me, to my dad, to my family, and I didn't expect this kind of performance. But I know he was watching tonight."

=== Week 17: at San Diego Chargers ===
Week 17: Oakland Raiders at San Diego Chargers – Game summary

Quarter	1	2	3	4	Total
Raiders	0	14	0	0	14
Chargers	7	7	0	7	21

at Qualcomm Stadium, San Diego, California

- Date: December 29
- Game time: 1:15 p.m. PST
- Game weather: Sunny, 61 °F (16 °C)
- Game attendance: 62,222
- Referee: Bill Leavy
- TV announcers (CBS): Bill Macatee, Beasley Reece, and Scott Kaplan
- Box score

Game information

First quarter

- SDG – LaDainian Tomlinson 2-yard run (Steve Christie kick), 7:44. Chargers 7–0. Drive: 10 plays, 62 yards, 5:19.

Second quarter

- OAK – Phillip Buchanon 80-yard punt return (Sebastian Janikowski kick), 4:39. Tied 7–7.
- SDG – David Boston 18-yard pass from Drew Brees (Steve Christie kick), 0:43. Chargers 14–7. Drive: 6 plays, 81 yards, 0:59.
- OAK – Doug Gabriel 85-yard kickoff return (Sebastian Janikowski kick), 0:24. Tied 14–14. Drive: 0 plays, 0 yards, 0:19.

Third quarter

- No scoring plays.

Fourth quarter

- SDG – LaDainian Tomlinson 2-yard run (Steve Christie kick), 11:42. Chargers 21–14. Drive: 5 plays, 63 yards, 2:23.

Top passers

- OAK – Rick Mirer – 4/11, 21 yards
- SDG – Drew Brees – 15/28, 97 yards, TD

Top rushers

- OAK – Zack Crockett – 10 rushes, 39 yards
- SDG – LaDainian Tomlinson – 31 rushes, 243 yards, 2 TD

Top receivers

- OAK – Jerry Rice – 2 receptions, 14 yards
- SDG – David Boston – 4 receptions, 43 yards, TD

== See also ==
- List of NFL teams affected by internal conflict
