= Tron LaFavor =

American football player (born 1979)

No. 73
- Position: Defensive tackle

Personal information
- Born: November 27, 1979 (age 46); Fort Lauderdale, Florida, U.S.
- Listed height: 6 ft 2 in (1.88 m)
- Listed weight: 290 lb (132 kg)

Career information
- High school: Dillard (Fort Lauderdale)
- College: Florida
- NFL draft: 2003: 5th round, 171st overall pick

Career history
- Chicago Bears (2003); Carolina Panthers (2004)*; Dallas Cowboys (2004); Baltimore Ravens (2005)*
- * Offseason or practice squad member only

Career NFL statistics
- Games played: 4
- Stats at Pro Football Reference

Trahern "Tron" LaFavor (born November 27, 1979) is an American former professional football player who was a defensive tackle in the National Football League (NFL) for the Chicago Bears. He played college football for the Florida Gators.

== Early life ==
LaFavor was born in Fort Lauderdale, Florida in 1979. He attended Cardinal Gibbons High School, where he was a three-year starter, playing different positions on the defense. He transferred his senior year to Dillard High School in Fort Lauderdale,

As a senior in 1998, he played defensive end making 86 tackles with 20 sacks, while receiving Florida Class 6A first-team All-state and USA Today honorable-mention high school All-American honors.

== College career ==
LaFavor accepted a football scholarship to attend the University of Florida in Gainesville, Florida. He played for coach Steve Spurrier and coach Ron Zook's Florida Gators football team from 1999 to 2002. As a freshman, he played in 9 out of 12 games as a backup defensive end.

As a sophomore, he was moved to defensive tackle at the end of the first month of the season. He played in all 12 games with one start at defensive end, registering 13 tackles (4 for loss), one interception and one fumble recovery. In 2000, he was a member of the Gators' Southeastern Conference (SEC) championship team.

As a junior, he played in 11 games with 9 starts at defensive tackle, posting 42 tackles (2 for loss), 6 quarterback pressures, 2 passes defensed and one fumble recovery. As a senior, he played in 13 games with 3 starts at defensive tackle. He was mostly a reserve player behind Ian Scott, collecting 51 tackles (32 solo), 2 sacks, 3 tackles for loss, 6 quarterback pressures, one pass defensed and one fumble recovery. He had 7 tackles, one quarterback pressure and one pass defensed against the University of South Carolina. LaFavor graduated from the University of Florida with a bachelor's degree in sociology in 2003.

== Professional career ==
Pre-draft measurables
Height	Weight	Arm length	Hand span	Vertical jump	Broad jump	Bench press
6 ft 1 in (1.85 m)	290 lb (132 kg)	31 3/4 in (0.81 m)	9 3/4 in (0.25 m)	28 in (0.71 m)	8 ft 10 in (2.69 m)	26 reps
All values from NFL Combine.

LaFavor was selected by the Chicago Bears in the fifth round (171st pick overall) of the 2003 NFL draft. As a rookie, he played in four games and was declared inactive in 12 contests. He was waived on August 30, 2004.

On October 13, 2004, he was signed by Carolina Panthers to their practice squad.

On November 23, 2004, he was signed by the Dallas Cowboys to their practice squad. On December 28, he was promoted to the active roster and was declared inactive for the last game of the season. He was released on May 3, 2005.

On August 4, 2005, he was signed as a free agent by the Baltimore Ravens. He was released on August 29.

== See also ==
- List of Chicago Bears players
- List of Florida Gators in the NFL draft
- List of University of Florida alumni
