= Bryan Anderson (American football) =

American football player (born 1980)

No. 68
- Position: Guard

Personal information
- Born: March 30, 1980 (age 46); Philadelphia, Pennsylvania, U.S.
- Listed height: 6 ft 4 in (1.93 m)
- Listed weight: 320 lb (145 kg)

Career information
- High school: John Bartram (Philadelphia)
- College: Pittsburgh
- NFL draft: 2003: 7th round, 261st overall pick

Career history
- Chicago Bears (2003–2004); New England Patriots (2005)*; Tampa Bay Buccaneers (2005)*
- * Offseason or practice squad member only

Awards and highlights
- First-team All-Big East (2002)

Career NFL statistics
- Games played: 4
- Games started: 0
- Stats at Pro Football Reference

Bryan Anderson (born March 30, 1980) is an American former professional football player who was an offensive guard in the National Football League (NFL). He was selected by the Chicago Bears in the seventh round of the 2003 NFL draft. He played college football for the Pittsburgh Panthers.

== Early life ==
Anderson played high school football at John Bartram High School in Philadelphia.

== College career ==
Anderson played college football for the Pittsburgh Panthers and was a four-year starter. He started 47 career games. He earned first-team All-Big East Conference honors his senior season in 2002.

== Professional career ==
=== Chicago Bears ===
Anderson was selected by the Chicago Bears in the seventh round, with the 261st overall pick, of the 2003 NFL draft. He officially signed with the team on July 9, 2003. He was waived on August 31 and signed to the team's practice squad on September 2. Anderson was promoted to the active roster on December 23, 2003.

He was waived by the Bears on September 5, 2004 and signed to the practice squad on September 7. He was released on September 17 and re-signed to the practice squad on September 21. Anderson was promoted to the active roster on December 11 and played in four games for the Bears during the 2004 season. He was waived on June 15, 2005.

=== New England Patriots ===
Anderson signed with the New England Patriots on June 23, 2005. He was waived on July 29, 2005.

=== Tampa Bay Buccaneers ===
Anderson was signed by the Tampa Bay Buccaneers on August 15, 2005. He was waived on August 17, 2005.
