= Cameron Worrell =

American football player (born 1979)

No. 24, 44, 45
- Position: Safety

Personal information
- Born: December 14, 1979 (age 46); Merced County, California, U.S.
- Listed height: 5 ft 11 in (1.80 m)
- Listed weight: 194 lb (88 kg)

Career information
- High school: Chowchilla (Chowchilla, California)
- College: Fresno State
- NFL draft: 2003: undrafted

Career history
- Chicago Bears (2003–2006); Miami Dolphins (2007); New York Jets (2008)*; Chicago Bears (2008)
- * Offseason or practice squad member only

Awards and highlights
- First-team All-WAC (2002)

Career NFL statistics
- Total tackles: 106
- Sacks: 2
- Forced fumbles: 2
- Fumble recoveries: 4
- Pass deflections: 1
- Stats at Pro Football Reference

Cameron Joseph Worrell (born December 14, 1979) is an American former professional football player who was a safety in the National Football League (NFL). He played college football for the Fresno State Bulldogs and was signed by the Chicago Bears as an undrafted free agent in 2003.

Worrell was also a member of the Miami Dolphins and New York Jets.

== Early life ==
Worrell was a two-year starter at both running back and safety at Chowchilla High School in Chowchilla, California. He earned North Sequoia League Offensive Player of the Year honors as a senior. He was also named to the All-Section team, gaining 1,300 yards on 160 carries with 16 touchdowns on offense and two interceptions on defense.

== College career ==
Worrell originally attended Fresno State University, but did not play as a redshirt freshman in 1999 and subsequently transferred to Fresno City College where he helped the Rams to a perfect regular season.

As a junior in 2001, Worrell appeared in 14 games and recorded 31 tackles with two sacks, four tackles for a loss, two interceptions and one fumble recovery.

In his first year as a starter for Fresno State, Worrell earned All-Western Athletic Conference honors. He started all 14 games as a senior and led the Bulldogs with career-highs of 106 tackles and five interceptions, including one returned for a touchdown. He added four sacks, two forced fumbles, one fumble recovery and seven passes defensed on the year.

== Professional career ==
=== Chicago Bears (first stint) ===
Worrell was undrafted in the 2003 NFL draft, but was signed by the Chicago Bears after a tryout during a post-draft minicamp. He was the only undrafted free agent to make the team out of training camp in 2003.

During his rookie season, Worrell saw action in 14 games on special teams and in a reserve role at safety. He recorded eight special teams tackles on the year and he also recovered an R. W. McQuarters fumble on a punt return.

Worrell played in 13 games during the 2004 season, amassing 16 tackles, a sack and a forced fumble. He missed the final two games of the season after being placed on Injured Reserve with an ankle injury.

A shoulder injury suffered in Week 3 of the preseason caused Worrell to miss the entire 2005 regular season.

Worrell had the best statistical year of his career to date in 2006. He appeared in all 16 games for the first time in his career and totaled 21 tackles, a sack, a forced fumble and three fumble recoveries. He played in a reserve role against the Indianapolis Colts in Super Bowl XLI, but did not accumulate any statistics.

=== Miami Dolphins ===
As an unrestricted free agent the following offseason, Worrell signed with the Miami Dolphins on March 8, 2007. He received a two-year contract from the team worth $2 million and including a $285,000 signing bonus. Worrell suffered a torn ACL in Week 13 and was placed on season-ending injured reserve.

The Dolphins waived Worrell on April 24, 2008, after he failed a physical.

=== New York Jets ===
Worrell signed with the New York Jets on June 8, 2008. He was assigned No. 45. He was placed on injured reserve on August 30 and released on September 3, 2008.

=== Chicago Bears (second stint) ===
Worrell after being injured for the whole 2008 season was signed on December 26, 2008, when Mike Brown was placed on injured reserve. He became a free agent following the season.

== Personal life ==
Worrell is the son of Dale Worrell and Polly Welk Worrell. His grandfather, Richard Welk, is the nephew of famous band leader Lawrence Welk. He is also a distant relative of American swimmer Michael Worrell.
