= Jared Peck (American football) =

American football player (born 1979)

No. 71, 73
- Position: Tackle

Personal information
- Born: May 6, 1979 (age 47); Bloomington, Minnesota, U.S.
- Listed height: 6 ft 5 in (1.96 m)
- Listed weight: 290 lb (132 kg)

Career information
- High school: Jefferson (Bloomington)
- College: North Dakota State (1998–2001)
- NFL draft: 2002: undrafted

Career history
- Denver Broncos (2002)*; St. Louis Rams (2002)*; New Orleans Saints (2003)*; Oakland Raiders (2003)*; Atlanta Falcons (2004–2005); Carolina Panthers (2006)*; → Cologne Centurions (2006)
- * Offseason or practice squad member only

Awards and highlights
- 2× First-team All-NCC (2000, 2001)

Career NFL statistics
- Games played: 1
- Stats at Pro Football Reference

Jared Richard Peck (born May 6, 1979) is an American former professional football tackle who played for the Atlanta Falcons of the National Football League (NFL). He played college football for the North Dakota State Bison. Peck had stints with the Denver Broncos, St. Louis Rams, New Orleans Saints, Oakland Raiders and Carolina Panthers.

== Early life ==
Peck was born on May 6, 1979, in Bloomington, Minnesota. He attended Jefferson High School in Bloomington.

== College career ==
Peck played college football for the North Dakota State Bison from 1998 to 2001 and was a four-year letterman at tight end. In 43 games. he had 52 receptions for 637 yards and seven touchdowns. Peck was a two-time All-North Central Conference selection in 2000 and 2001.

== Professional career ==
=== Denver Broncos ===
After going undrafted in the 2002 NFL draft, Peck signed with the Denver Broncos as an undrafted free agent. On August 26, he was waived by the team.

=== St. Louis Rams ===
On September 26, 2002, Peck was signed to the practice squad of the St. Louis Rams. On October 21, he was released. On November 4, Peck was re-signed to the practice squad. He was released again on November 19.

=== New Orleans Saints ===
On January 28, 2003, Peck signed with the New Orleans Saints. On August 25, he was released by the team.

=== Oakland Raiders ===
On December 16, 2003, Peck was signed to the practice squad of the Oakland Raiders.

=== Atlanta Falcons ===
On December 30, 2003, Peck signed a reserve/futures contract with the Atlanta Falcons. On September 4, 2004, he was released and signed to the practice squad. On September 15, Peck was elevated to the active roster and played against the St. Louis Rams on special teams. He spent the remainder of the season on the practice squad. On September 3, 2005, Peck was released by the Falcons.

=== Carolina Panthers ===
On January 11, 2006, Peck signed a reserve/futures contract with the Carolina Panthers. On July 28, he was placed on the reserve/did not report list after not appearing at training camp. Through his agents, Peck stated that he planned to retire from football.

=== Cologne Centurions ===
On January 27, 2006, Peck was allocated to the Cologne Centurions of NFL Europe. He played in ten games at right tackle.
