= Ian Scott (American football) =

American football player and coach (born 1981)

No. 95, 98
- Positions: Defensive tackle, nose tackle

Personal information
- Born: November 8, 1981 (age 44); Greenville, South Carolina, U.S.
- Listed height: 6 ft 3 in (1.91 m)
- Listed weight: 315 lb (143 kg)

Career information
- High school: Gainesville (Gainesville, Florida)
- College: Florida
- NFL draft: 2003: 4th round, 116th overall pick

Career history

Playing
- Chicago Bears (2003–2006); Philadelphia Eagles (2007); Carolina Panthers (2008)*; San Diego Chargers (2008–2009)
- * Offseason or practice squad member only

Coaching
- Florida (graduate assistant) (2017–2018); UCF (assistant defensive line) (2018–2021); Central Michigan (defensive line) (2021-2023); Gainesville (head coach) (2023–2026); South Forsyth (defensive assistant) (2026–present)

Awards and highlights
- Second-team All-SEC (2001)

Career NFL statistics
- Total tackles: 120
- Sacks: 3
- Fumble recoveries: 2
- Stats at Pro Football Reference

Josef Ian Scott (born November 8, 1981) is an American former professional football player who was a nose tackle for six seasons in the National Football League (NFL) during the 2000s. Scott played college football for the Florida Gators, and thereafter, he played in the NFL for the Chicago Bears and San Diego Chargers.

== Early life ==
Scott was born in Greenville, South Carolina, in 1981. He attended Gainesville High School in Gainesville, Florida, where he played high school football for the Gainesville Purple Hurricanes and he was a member of the Purple Hurricanes' 1999 Florida state championship basketball team. Scott was a member of the National Honor Society and the valedictorian of his graduating class in 2000.

== College career ==
Scott accepted an athletic scholarship to attend the University of Florida in Gainesville, where he majored in industrial engineering and played for coach Steve Spurrier and coach Ron Zook's Gators football teams from 2000 to 2002. After starting for the Gators in 2001 and 2002, he was a second-team All-Southeastern Conference (SEC) selection both seasons. After his junior year, Scott decided to forgo his final season of NCAA eligibility and entered the NFL draft.

== Professional career ==
Pre-draft measurables
Height	Weight	Arm length	Hand span	40-yard dash	10-yard split	20-yard split	20-yard shuttle	Three-cone drill	Vertical jump	Broad jump	Bench press
6 ft 2 3/8 in (1.89 m)	312 lb (142 kg)	30 1/4 in (0.77 m)	9 7/8 in (0.25 m)	5.19 s	1.76 s	3.01 s	5.00 s	8.12 s	28.5 in (0.72 m)	8 ft 3 in (2.51 m)	28 reps
All values from NFL Combine.

=== Chicago Bears ===
Scott was selected 116th overall by the Chicago Bears in the fourth round of the 2003 NFL draft. He played for the Bears for four seasons from 2003 to 2006.

=== Philadelphia Eagles ===
After being released by the Bears following the 2006 season, Scott was signed to a one-year contract by the Philadelphia Eagles on May 3, 2007, but was placed on injured reserve before the start of the season and did not appear in a regular season game during 2007.

=== Carolina Panthers ===
On April 29, 2008, Scott was signed by the Carolina Panthers. He was released on August 20.

=== San Diego Chargers ===
On September 23, 2008, Scott was signed by the San Diego Chargers after the team released cornerback DeJuan Tribble. On October 14, 2009, he was re-signed by the Chargers after the team released safety Clinton Hart. Scott played in sixteen games for the Chargers in 2008 and 2009, and started in seven of them in 2009. He was released on June 21, 2010.

In his six-season NFL career, Scott played in sixty-five games and started forty of them. He totaled 112 tackles, two fumble recoveries and an interception.

== Coaching career ==
On December 5, 2022, the Carolina Panthers hired Scott to serve as their assistant defensive line coach. Steve Wilks made the hire after the incumbent, Terrance Knighton, departed the staff to join Matt Rhule's coaching staff at the University of Nebraska-Lincoln.

== See also ==
- List of Chicago Bears players
- List of Florida Gators in the NFL draft
- List of Philadelphia Eagles players
