= 2005 St. Louis Rams season =

NFL team season

- Owner: Georgia Frontiere
- Head coach: Mike Martz (Weeks 1–5); Joe Vitt (Interim; Weeks 6–17)
- Home stadium: Edward Jones Dome

Results
- Record: 6–10
- Division place: 2nd NFC West
- Playoffs: Did not qualify
- Pro Bowlers: OT Orlando Pace; WR Torry Holt

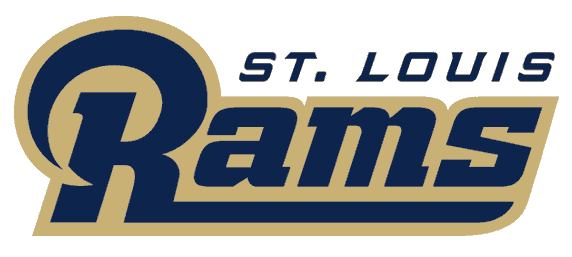
Script logo for the NFL franchise St. Louis Rams.

The 2005 season was the St. Louis Rams' 68th in the National Football League (NFL) and their 11th in St. Louis. They tried to improve on their previous output in which they won eight games. Instead, they collapsed and finished the season with a 6–10 record and finished the season with double-digit losses for the first time since 1998. The Rams also missed the playoffs for the first time since 2002. From 2006 onwards the Rams continued to crumble: during the subsequent nine seasons in St. Louis, the team neither made it into the playoffs nor finished with a winning record (though they almost made it into the 2010 playoffs, but lost to the Seahawks in their last game to lose the division). Their 6–42 record between 2007 and 2009 was the worst for such a period by any team between the World War II Chicago Cardinals and the 2015 to 2017 Cleveland Browns.

On October 10, news broke out that head coach Mike Martz announced he was leaving the team indefinitely after being diagnosed with a bacterial infection. A day before that, he coached his last game in a home loss against Seattle. Joe Vitt took over the sidelines for the rest of the season. Though Martz was medically cleared to return, management refused to let him do so and he was fired the day after the final regular season game. Several players said they enjoyed having Martz as their head coach.

As second-year running back Steven Jackson earned the starting position, this year was the final season for future Hall of Famer Marshall Faulk as he missed the following season because of reconstructive knee surgery, which ultimately led to his retirement in 2007.

== Offseason ==
=== NFL draft ===
2005 St. Louis Rams draft
Round	Pick	Player	Position	College	Notes
1	19	Alex Barron	Tackle	Florida State	
2	50	Ron Bartell	Cornerback	Howard	
3	66	O. J. Atogwe	Safety	Stanford	from Miami
3	81	Richie Incognito *	Center	Nebraska	
4	117	Jerome Carter	Safety	Florida State	
4	134	Claude Terrell	Guard	New Mexico	
5	144	Jerome Collins	Tight end	Notre Dame	from NY Giants via San Diego and Tampa Bay
6	192	Dante Ridgeway	Wide receiver	Ball State	
6	210	Reggie Hodges	Punter	Ball State	
7	250	Ryan Fitzpatrick	Quarterback	Harvard	
7	251	Madison Hedgecock	Fullback	North Carolina	
Made roster * Made at least one Pro Bowl during career

=== Undrafted free agents ===
2005 undrafted free agents of note
Player	Position	College
Zach Bray	Guard	TCU
Jeremy Calahan	Defensive tackle	Rice
Jeremy Cater	Wide receiver	Western Carolina
Clifford Dukes	Defensive end	Michigan State
Vontrell Jamison	Defensive end	Clemson
Matt McChesney	Defensive tackle	Colorado
Dominic Robinson	Wide receiver	Florida State
Dominique Thompson	Wide receiver	William & Mary
Duvol Thompson	Cornerback	Penn

== Roster ==
2005 St. Louis Rams roster
Quarterbacks (QB): 12 Ryan Fitzpatrick; 11 Jamie Martin; 15 Jeff Smoker; Running backs (RB): 26 Aveion Cason; 28 Marshall Faulk; 33 Arlen Harris; 44 Madison Hedgecock FB; 39 Steven Jackson; Wide receivers (WR): 80 Isaac Bruce; 83 Kevin Curtis; 81 Torry Holt; 89 Dane Looker; 84 Shaun McDonald; Tight ends (TE): 48 Jerome Collins; 86 Brandon Manumaleuna; 87 Aaron Walker	Offensive linemen (OL): 70 Alex Barron OT; 67 Andy McCollum C; 71 Matt Morgan OT; 63 Ben Noll G; 76 Orlando Pace OT; 75 Claude Terrell G; 62 Adam Timmerman G; 66 Rex Tucker G/OT; 63 Larry Turner C; Defensive linemen (DL): 90 Jeremy Calahan DT; 93 Brandon Green DE; 95 Anthony Hargrove DE; 98 Brian Howard DT; 73 Jimmy Kennedy DT; 97 Tyoka Jackson DE; 92 Damione Lewis DT; 91 Leonard Little DE; 79 Ryan Pickett DT	Linebackers (LB): 54 Brandon Chillar OLB; 99 Clifford Dukes OLB; 57 Trev Faulk MLB; 51 Mike Goolsby MLB; 56 Jeremy Loyd OLB; 50 Pisa Tinoisamoa OLB; 58 Drew Wahlroos OLB; Defensive backs (DB): 20 Dwight Anderson CB; 31 Adam Archuleta SS; 21 Oshiomogho Atogwe FS; 32 Ron Bartell CB; 27 Dwaine Carpenter FS; 25 Mike Furrey FS; 24 DeJuan Groce CB; 35 Corey Ivy CB; 37 Chris Johnson CB; Special teams (ST): 4 Bryan Barker P; 45 Chris Massey LS; 14 Jeff Wilkins K	Practice squad: 16 Jeremy Carter WR; 65 Toby Cecil C; 41 Terry Holley S; 34 Derrick Knight RB; 19 Brandon Middleton WR; 77 Drew Strojny OT; 17 Dominique Thompson WR; 82 Darius Williams TE; Reserve: 10 Marc Bulger QB (IR); 23 Jerametrius Butler CB (IR); 42 Jerome Carter S (IR); 55 Chris Claiborne OLB (IR); 52 Dexter Coakley OLB (IR); 30 Terry Fair CB (IR); 22 Travis Fisher CB (IR); 68 Richie Incognito G (NF-Inj.); 61 Tom Nütten G (IR); 60 Blaine Saipaia OT (IR); 88 Roland Williams TE (IR); Rookies in italics 53 active, 11 reserve, 8 practice squad

== Schedule ==
Week	Date	Opponent	Result	Record	Venue	Attendance
1	September 11	at **San Francisco 49ers**	**L** 25–28	0–1	Monster Park	67,918
2	September 18	at **Arizona Cardinals**	**W** 17–12	1–1	Sun Devil Stadium	45,160
3	September 25	Tennessee Titans	**W** 31–27	2–1	Edward Jones Dome	65,835
4	October 2	at New York Giants	**L** 24–44	2–2	Giants Stadium	78,453
5	October 9	**Seattle Seahawks**	**L** 31–37	2–3	Edward Jones Dome	65,707
6	October 17	at Indianapolis Colts	**L** 28–45	2–4	RCA Dome	57,307
7	October 23	New Orleans Saints	**W** 28–17	3–4	Edward Jones Dome	64,586
8	October 30	Jacksonville Jaguars	**W** 24–21	4–4	Edward Jones Dome	65,251
9	Bye					
10	November 13	at **Seattle Seahawks**	**L** 16–31	4–5	Qwest Field	67,192
11	November 20	**Arizona Cardinals**	**L** 28–38	4–6	Edward Jones Dome	65,750
12	November 27	at Houston Texans	**W** 33–27 (OT)	5–6	Reliant Stadium	70,010
13	December 4	Washington Redskins	**L** 9–24	5–7	Edward Jones Dome	65,701
14	December 11	at Minnesota Vikings	**L** 13–27	5–8	Hubert H. Humphrey Metrodome	64,005
15	December 18	Philadelphia Eagles	**L** 16–17	5–9	Edward Jones Dome	65,382
16	December 24	**San Francisco 49ers**	**L** 20–24	5–10	Edward Jones Dome	65,473
17	January 1, 2006	at Dallas Cowboys	**W** 20–10	6–10	Texas Stadium	63,131

Note: Intra-division opponents are in bold text.

== Season summary ==
=== Week 2: at Arizona Cardinals ===
Week Two: St. Louis Rams (0–1) at Arizona Cardinals (0–1)

Quarter	1	2	3	4	Total
Rams	7	3	7	0	17
Cardinals	3	3	3	3	12

at Sun Devil Stadium, Tempe, Arizona

- Date: September 18
- Game time: 4:05 p.m. EST
- Game weather: 94 °F (34 °C)
- Game attendance: 45,160
- Referee: Jeff Triplette
- TV announcers (Fox): Ron Pitts & Tim Ryan
- Pro-Football-Reference.com

Game information

First quarter

- STL – Torry Holt 19-yard pass from Marc Bulger (Jeff Wilkins kick), 11:42. Rams 7–0. Drive: 7 plays, 80 yards, 3:18.
- ARI — Neil Rackers 29-yard field goal, 5:38. Rams 7–3. Drive: 10 plays, 57 yards, 3:19.

Second quarter

- ARI – Neil Rackers 26-yard field goal, 8:44. Rams 7–6. Drive: 8 plays, 37 yards, 3:59.
- STL – Jeff Wilkins 29-yard field goal, 3:42. Rams 10–6. Drive: 10 plays, 69 yards, 5:02.

Third quarter

- ARI – Neil Rackers 48-yard field goal, 10:23. Rams 10–9. Drive: 9 plays, 45 yards, 4:37.
- STL – Steven Jackson 7-yard run (Jeff Wilkins kick), 5:45. Rams 17–9. Drive: 8 plays, 76 yards, 4:38.

Fourth quarter

- ARI – Neil Rackers 35-yard field goal, 6:59. Rams 17–12. Drive: 9 plays, 56 yards, 5:48.

Top passers

- STL – Marc Bulger – 18/29, 216 yards, TD, INT
- ARI – Kurt Warner – 29/42, 327 yards, INT

Top rushers

- STL – Steven Jackson – 18 rushes, 93 yards, TD
- ARI – Marcel Shipp – 12 rushes, 54 yards

Top receivers

- STL – Torry Holt – 4 receptions, 70 yards, TD
- ARI – Anquan Boldin – 8 receptions, 119 yards

== Standings ==
NFC West
	W	L	T	PCT	DIV	CONF	PF	PA	STK
^{(1)} Seattle Seahawks	13	3	0	.813	6–0	10–2	452	271	L1
St. Louis Rams	6	10	0	.375	1–5	3–9	363	429	W1
Arizona Cardinals	5	11	0	.313	3–3	4–8	311	387	L1
San Francisco 49ers	4	12	0	.250	2–4	3–9	239	428	W2
