= 2004 St. Louis Rams season =

NFL team sports season

- Owner: Georgia Frontiere
- Head coach: Mike Martz
- Home stadium: Edward Jones Dome

Results
- Record: 8–8
- Division place: 2nd NFC West
- Playoffs: Won Wild Card Playoffs (at Seahawks) 27–20; Lost Divisional Playoffs (at Falcons) 17–47
- Pro Bowlers: WR Torry Holt; OT Orlando Pace

The 2004 season was the St. Louis Rams' 67th in the National Football League (NFL) and their tenth in St. Louis. For the first time since 1997, Kurt Warner was not on the opening day roster.

Although the Rams’ record was good enough to qualify for the postseason, they did so without posting a winning record. Statistics site Football Outsiders calculates that the 2004 Rams were, play for play, the worst team to make the playoffs in the site's rating history. This was also the last time the Rams made the playoffs in St. Louis; the team returned to the playoffs in 2017, their second season after the franchise returned to Los Angeles.

The season is memorable for the Rams drafting running back Steven Jackson with the 24th pick of the 2004 NFL Draft. During the season, the Rams relied less on Marshall Faulk, who was slowed by age and injuries, forcing Jackson to garner a bulk of the carries. He finished the season with 673 rushing yards despite seeing limited action.

The Rams, in the playoffs, defeated their rival Seattle Seahawks in the Wild Card round, but their 10th season in St. Louis ended in a 47–17 blowout to the Atlanta Falcons in the Divisional round. The Rams would not make the playoffs again until 2017 when they moved back to Los Angeles.

For the first time this season, the Rams completed a 2–0 regular season sweep of the rival Seahawks. They would not accomplish this again until 2015.

== Offseason ==
=== Draft ===
2004 St. Louis Rams draft
| Round | Pick | Player | Position | College | Notes |
| 1 | 24 | Steven Jackson | RB | Oregon State | |
| 3 | 91 | Tony Hargrove | DE | Georgia Tech | |
| 4 | 130 | Brandon Chillar | LB | North Texas | |
| 5 | 158 | Jason Shivers | S | Arizona State | |
| 6 | 201 | Jeff Smoker | QB | Michigan State | |
| 7 | 237 | Erik Jensen | TE | Iowa | |
| 7 | 238 | Larry Turner | OT | Eastern Kentucky | |
Made roster † Pro Football Hall of Fame * Made at least one Pro Bowl during career

== Roster ==
2004 St. Louis Rams roster
| Quarterbacks (QB): 10 Marc Bulger; 12 Chris Chandler; 11 Jamie Martin; 9 Jeff Smoker; Running backs (RB): 27 Aveion Cason; 28 Marshall Faulk; 44 Joey Goodspeed FB; 33 Arlen Harris; 39 Steven Jackson; Wide receivers (WR): 80 Isaac Bruce; 83 Kevin Curtis; 82 Mike Furrey; 81 Torry Holt; 89 Dane Looker; 84 Shaun McDonald; Tight ends (TE): 47 Nick Burley; 87 Cam Cleeland; 86 Brandon Manumaleuna | Offensive linemen (OL): 72 Darnell Alford G; 69 Matt Lehr G; 67 Andy McCollum C; 61 Tom Nütten G; 76 Orlando Pace OT; 60 Blaine Saipaia OT; 62 Adam Timmerman G; 64 Larry Turner C; 77 Grant Williams OT; Defensive linemen (DL): 94 Bryce Fisher DE; 96 Erik Flowers DE; 95 Anthony Hargrove DE; 98 Brian Howard DT; 97 Tyoka Jackson DT; 73 Jimmy Kennedy DT; 92 Damione Lewis DT; 91 Leonard Little DE; 79 Ryan Pickett DT | Linebackers (LB): 54 Brandon Chillar OLB; 57 Trev Faulk MLB; 52 Tommy Polley OLB; 55 Robert Thomas MLB; 50 Pisa Tinoisamoa OLB; 58 Drew Wahlroos OLB; Defensive backs (DB): 20 Dwight Anderson CB; 31 Adam Archuleta SS; 23 Jerametrius Butler CB; 25 Rich Coady S; 42 Antuan Edwards FS; 22 Travis Fisher CB; 21 Kevin Garrett CB; 24 DeJuan Groce CB; Special teams (ST): 45 Chris Massey LS; 2 Kevin Stemke P; 14 Jeff Wilkins K | Practice squad: 47 Mike Brake TE; 65 Toby Cecil C; 88 Michael Coleman WR; 36 Dusty McGrorty RB; 8 Russ Michna QB; 19 Brandon Middleton WR; 71 Matt Morgan OT; 51 Tony Newson OLB; Reserve: 37 Zack Bronson SS (IR); 66 Chris Dishman G (IR); 49 Erik Jensen TE (IR); 56 Jeremy Loyd OLB(IR); 63 Scott Tercero OT (IR); 68 Kyle Turley OT (IR); 35 Aeneas Williams FS (IR); Rookies in italics 53 active, 7 reserve, 8 practice squad |

== Regular season ==
=== Schedule ===
| Week | Date | Opponent | Result | Record | Venue | Attendance |
|---|---|---|---|---|---|---|
| 1 | September 12 | **Arizona Cardinals** | **W** 17–10 | 1–0 | Edward Jones Dome | 65,538 |
| 2 | September 19 | at Atlanta Falcons | **L** 17–34 | 1–1 | Georgia Dome | 70,882 |
| 3 | September 26 | New Orleans Saints | **L** 25–28 (OT) | 1–2 | Edward Jones Dome | 65,856 |
| 4 | October 3 | at **San Francisco 49ers** | **W** 24–14 | 2–2 | 3Com Park | 66,696 |
| 5 | October 10 | at **Seattle Seahawks** | **W** 33–27 (OT) | 3–2 | Qwest Field | 66,940 |
| 6 | October 18 | Tampa Bay Buccaneers | **W** 28–21 | 4–2 | Edward Jones Dome | 66,040 |
| 7 | October 24 | at Miami Dolphins | **L** 14–31 | 4–3 | Pro Player Stadium | 72,945 |
| 8 | Bye | | | | | |
| 9 | November 7 | New England Patriots | **L** 22–40 | 4–4 | Edward Jones Dome | 66,107 |
| 10 | November 14 | **Seattle Seahawks** | **W** 23–12 | 5–4 | Edward Jones Dome | 66,044 |
| 11 | November 21 | at Buffalo Bills | **L** 17–37 | 5–5 | Ralph Wilson Stadium | 72,393 |
| 12 | November 28 | at Green Bay Packers | **L** 17–45 | 5–6 | Lambeau Field | 70,385 |
| 13 | December 5 | **San Francisco 49ers** | **W** 16–6 | 6–6 | Edward Jones Dome | 65,793 |
| 14 | December 12 | at Carolina Panthers | **L** 7–20 | 6–7 | Bank of America Stadium | 73,306 |
| 15 | December 19 | at **Arizona Cardinals** | **L** 7–31 | 6–8 | Sun Devil Stadium | 40,070 |
| 16 | December 27 | Philadelphia Eagles | **W** 20–7 | 7–8 | Edward Jones Dome | 66,129 |
| 17 | January 2 | New York Jets | **W** 32–29 (OT) | 8–8 | Edward Jones Dome | 65,877 |
Note: Intra-division opponents are in **bold** text.

=== Week 1 ===
| Team | 1 | 2 | 3 | 4 | Total |
|---|---|---|---|---|---|
| Cardinals | 0 | 3 | 7 | 0 | 10 |
| • Rams | 0 | 6 | 3 | 8 | 17 |

- Date: September 12
- Location: Edward Jones Dome
- Game attendance: 65,538
- Game weather: Indoors (dome)
- Referee: Bill Carollo
- TV announcers (FOX): Dan Miller, JC Pearson

Scoring summary
| Q2 | 11:21 | STL | Wilkins 50 yard field goal | STL 3–0 |
| Q2 | 8:10 | ARI | Rackers 22 yard field goal | Tie 3–3 |
| Q2 | 2:39 | STL | Wilkins 28 yard field goal | STL 6–3 |
| Q3 | 5:50 | STL | Wilkins 22 yard field goal | STL 9–3 |
| Q3 | 0:57 | ARI | Smith 11 yard run (Rackers kick) | ARI 10–9 |
| Q4 | 14:27 | STL | Bruce 8 yard pass from Bulger (Faulk run) | STL 17–10 |

- Marshall Faulk 22 Rush, 128 Yds
- Isaac Bruce 9 Rec, 112 Yds

== Standings ==
NFC West
| | W | L | T | PCT | DIV | CONF | PF | PA | STK |
|---|---|---|---|---|---|---|---|---|---|
| ^{(4)} Seattle Seahawks | 9 | 7 | 0 | .563 | 3–3 | 8–4 | 371 | 373 | W2 |
| ^{(5)} St. Louis Rams | 8 | 8 | 0 | .500 | 5–1 | 7–5 | 319 | 392 | W2 |
| Arizona Cardinals | 6 | 10 | 0 | .375 | 2–4 | 5–7 | 284 | 322 | W1 |
| San Francisco 49ers | 2 | 14 | 0 | .125 | 2–4 | 2–10 | 259 | 452 | L3 |

NFC
| # | Team | Division | W | L | T | PCT | DIV | CONF | SOS | SOV | STK |
|---|---|---|---|---|---|---|---|---|---|---|---|
Division leaders
| 1 | Philadelphia Eagles | East | 13 | 3 | 0 | .813 | 6–0 | 11–1 | .453 | .409 | L2 |
| 2 | Atlanta Falcons | South | 11 | 5 | 0 | .688 | 4–2 | 8–4 | .420 | .432 | L2 |
| 3 | Green Bay Packers | North | 10 | 6 | 0 | .625 | 5–1 | 9–3 | .457 | .419 | W2 |
| 4 | Seattle Seahawks | West | 9 | 7 | 0 | .563 | 3–3 | 8–4 | .445 | .368 | W2 |
Wild cards
| 5 (Note: St. Louis clinched the NFC #5 seed instead of Minnesota or New Orleans based on better conference record (7–5 to Minnesota’s 5–7 to New Orleans’ 6–6).) | St. Louis Rams | West | 8 | 8 | 0 | .500 | 5–1 | 7–5 | .488 | .438 | W2 |
| 6 (Note: Minnesota clinched the NFC #6 seed instead of New Orleans based on head-to-head victory.) | Minnesota Vikings | North | 8 | 8 | 0 | .500 | 3–3 | 5–7 | .480 | .406 | L2 |
Did not qualify for the postseason
| 7 | New Orleans Saints | South | 8 | 8 | 0 | .500 | 3–3 | 6–6 | .465 | .427 | W4 |
| 8 | Carolina Panthers | South | 7 | 9 | 0 | .438 | 3–3 | 6–6 | .496 | .366 | L1 |
| 9 (Note: Detroit finished ahead of Arizona and New York Giants based upon head-to-head record (2–0 versus Arizona’s 1–1 and New York Giants’ 0–2). Division tiebreak was initially used to eliminate Dallas and Washington.) | Detroit Lions | North | 6 | 10 | 0 | .375 | 2–4 | 5–7 | .496 | .417 | L2 |
| 10 | Arizona Cardinals | West | 6 | 10 | 0 | .375 | 2–4 | 5–7 | .461 | .417 | W1 |
| 11 (Note: New York Giants finished ahead of Dallas and Washington in the NFC East based on better head-to-head record (3–1 to Dallas‘ 2–2 to Washington’s 1–3).) | New York Giants | East | 6 | 10 | 0 | .375 | 3–3 | 5–7 | .516 | .417 | W1 |
| 12 (Note: Dallas finished ahead of Washington in the NFC East based on head-to-head sweep.) | Dallas Cowboys | East | 6 | 10 | 0 | .375 | 2–4 | 5–7 | .516 | .375 | L1 |
| 13 | Washington Redskins | East | 6 | 10 | 0 | .375 | 1–5 | 6–6 | .477 | .333 | W1 |
| 14 (Note: Tampa Bay finished ahead of Chicago based upon head-to-head victory.) | Tampa Bay Buccaneers | South | 5 | 11 | 0 | .313 | 2–4 | 4–8 | .477 | .413 | L4 |
| 15 | Chicago Bears | North | 5 | 11 | 0 | .313 | 2–4 | 4–8 | .465 | .388 | L4 |
| 16 | San Francisco 49ers | West | 2 | 14 | 0 | .125 | 2–4 | 2–10 | .488 | .375 | L3 |
Tiebreakers (Note: When breaking ties for three or more teams under the NFL's rules, they are first broken within divisions, then comparing only the highest-ranked remaining team from each division.)

== Playoffs ==
| Round | Date | Opponent (seed) | Result | Record | Venue | Attendance |
|---|---|---|---|---|---|---|
| Wildcard | January 8 | at Seattle Seahawks (4) | W 27–20 | 1–0 | Qwest Field | 65,397 |
| Divisional | January 15 | at Atlanta Falcons (2) | L 17–47 | 1–1 | Georgia Dome | 70,709 |

=== Wild Card ===
| Team | 1 | 2 | 3 | 4 | Total |
|---|---|---|---|---|---|
| • Rams | 7 | 7 | 3 | 10 | 27 |
| Seahawks | 3 | 7 | 3 | 7 | 20 |

- Date: January 8
- Location: Qwest Field
- Game attendance: 65,397
- Referee: Walt Coleman

Scoring summary
| Q1 | 11:33 | STL | Holt 15 yard pass from Bulger (Wilkins kick) | STL 7–0 |
| Q1 | 2:05 | SEA | Brown 47 yard field goal | STL 7–3 |
| Q2 | 13:32 | STL | Faulk 1 yard run (Wilkins kick) | STL 14–3 |
| Q2 | 6:28 | SEA | Engram 19 yard pass from Hasselbeck (Brown kick) | STL 14–10 |
| Q3 | 8:02 | SEA | Brown 30 yard field goal | STL 14–13 |
| Q3 | 2:35 | STL | Wilkins 38 yard field goal | STL 17–13 |
| Q4 | 13:43 | SEA | Jackson 23 yard pass from Hasselbeck (Brown kick) | SEA 20–17 |
| Q4 | 8:07 | STL | Wilkins 27 yard field goal | Tie 20–20 |
| Q4 | 2:11 | STL | Cleeland 17 yard pass from Bulger (Wilkins kick) | STL 27–20 |

- Marc Bulger 18/32, 313 Yds
- Torry Holt 6 Rec, 108 Yds
- Kevin Curtis 4 Rec, 107 Yds
