= 2001 St. Louis Rams season =

NFL team season

- Owner: Georgia Frontiere
- General manager: Mike Martz and Charley Armey
- Head coach: Mike Martz
- Offensive coordinator: Bobby Jackson
- Defensive coordinator: Lovie Smith
- Home stadium: The Dome at America's Center/Edward Jones Dome

Results
- Record: 14–2
- Division place: 1st NFC West
- Playoffs: Won Divisional Playoffs (vs. Packers) 45–17; Won NFC Championship (vs. Eagles) 29–24; Lost Super Bowl XXXVI (vs. Patriots) 17–20
- All-Pros: QB Kurt Warner (1st team); RB Marshall Faulk (1st team); TE Ernie Conwell (2nd team); OT Orlando Pace (1st team); G Adam Timmerman (2nd team); CB Aeneas Williams (1st team)
- Pro Bowlers: QB Kurt Warner; RB Marshall Faulk; WR Isaac Bruce; WR Torry Holt; T Orlando Pace; G Adam Timmerman; CB Aeneas Williams

The 2001 season was the St. Louis Rams' 65th in the National Football League (NFL), their seventh in St. Louis and their second under head coach Mike Martz. The Rams finished 14–2, including a perfect 8–0 record in road games. Their 14 regular season wins remain a franchise record. The Rams became the first team in NFL history to open three consecutive seasons with six straight wins and the first to score 500 or more points in three consecutive seasons. Quarterback Kurt Warner won his second league MVP award, marking the third consecutive season that the MVP was awarded to a Ram (Warner in 1999, Marshall Faulk in 2000).

The Rams returned to the Super Bowl for a second time after winning their first Super Bowl and third overall NFL title two years earlier, but this time against the 11–5 New England Patriots, led by second-year head coach Bill Belichick and by a young Tom Brady. The Rams were expected by many to win their 2nd Super Bowl title, but lost 20–17 after Patriots placekicker Adam Vinatieri kicked the game-clinching field goal. This was the Rams' last Super Bowl appearance until the 2018 season, when they defeated the New Orleans Saints 26–23 in the NFC Championship game, and would meet the New England Patriots in Super Bowl LIII in a rematch of Super Bowl XXXVI, but lost to them again 13–3. By that time the Rams would be based in Los Angeles after relocating from St. Louis in 2016. The Rams, however, would win Super Bowl LVI, defeating the Cincinnati Bengals.

This was also the final season with the Rams as "The Greatest Show on Turf" as Kurt Warner struggled the following two seasons with the team. He was then replaced by Marc Bulger.

Prior to the season, Trans World Airlines filed for bankruptcy and was later acquired by AMR Corporation, the parent company of American Airlines, which terminated the naming rights deal to what had been the Trans World Dome. The Rams' home stadium reverted to its original name of The Dome at America's Center throughout the 2001 season until January 25, 2002 when Edward Jones Investments was announced as the franchise's new naming rights partner. Beginning with the NFC Championship Game, the stadium was rechristened as the Edward Jones Dome, a name it would retain for the remainder of the Rams franchise's presence in St. Louis.

== Offseason ==
With one of the worst defenses in the NFL in 2000 (allowing 471 points), the Rams knew an overhaul was needed in this area. First, Lovie Smith was hired away from the Tampa Bay Buccaneers to serve as defensive coordinator. Smith brought some of his key contributors from the 1999 Tampa Bay Buccaneers team, who the Rams beat in the NFC Championship Game, namely linebacker Don Davis and defensive linemen Chidi Ahanotu and Tyoka Jackson. Linebacker Mark Fields, who led the 2000 New Orleans Saints in tackles, and defensive back Kim Herring, a key member of the defending Super Bowl champion Baltimore Ravens defense, were both acquired via trade or free agency. The Rams had three first-round draft picks, and all were used on defense. Defensive tackles Damione Lewis and Ryan Pickett, and Adam Archuleta, a linebacker at Arizona State who would be converted to strong safety, were all drafted, along with Florida State linebacker Tommy Polley in the third round. All would be key contributors.

The most important acquisition (other than Smith), however, was the trade for veteran cornerback Aeneas Williams. Williams' leadership was the key element in a much-improved Rams defense in 2001.

Additions	Subtractions
CB Aeneas Williams (Cardinals)	CB Taje Allen (Chiefs)
FS Kim Herring (Ravens)	WR Tony Horne (Chiefs)
LB Don Davis (Buccaneers)	LB Michael Jones (Steelers)
C/G Frank Garcia (Panthers)	CB Todd Lyght (Lions)
T Rod Jones (Bengals)	WR Chris Thomas (Chiefs)
LB Mark Fields (Saints)	S Keith Lyle (Redskins)
QB Jamie Martin (Jaguars)	TE Roland Williams (Raiders)
DT Tyoka Jackson (Buccaneers)	
DE Chidi Ahanotu (Buccaneers)	

=== NFL draft ===
2001 St. Louis Rams draft
Round	Pick	Player	Position	College	Notes
1	12	Damione Lewis	Defensive tackle	Miami (FL)	from Kansas City
1	20	Adam Archuleta	Strong safety	Arizona State	
1	29	Ryan Pickett	Defensive tackle	Ohio State	from Tennessee
2	42	Tommy Polley	Linebacker	Florida State	
3	83	Brian Allen	Linebacker	Florida State	
4	116	Milton Wynn	Wide receiver	Washington State	
4	129	Brandon Manumaleuna	Tight end	Arizona	
5	145	Jerametrius Butler	Cornerback	Kansas State	
6	197	Francis St. Paul	Wide receiver	Northern Arizona	
Made roster

== Personnel ==
2001 St. Louis Rams staff
Front office: Chairman – Georgia Frontiere; Vice chairman – Stan Kroenke; President – John Shaw; President of football operations – Jay Zygmunt; General manager – Mike Martz and Charley Armey (Martz has final say on personnel decisions); Senior vice president of administration – Bob Wallace; Director of scouting – Lawrence McCutcheon; Administrator of pro personnel – Jack Faulkner; Head coaches: Head coach – Mike Martz; Associate head coach / offensive coordinator / running backs – Bobby Jackson; Assistant head coach / offensive line – John Matsko; Offensive coaches: Quarterbacks – John Ramsdell; Wide receivers – Ken Zampese; Tight ends – Wilbert Montgomery; Offensive line – Jim Hanifan; Offensive assistant – Henry Ellard	Defensive coaches: Defensive coordinator – Lovie Smith; Defensive line – Bill Kollar; Linebackers – Mike Haluchak; Secondary – Ron Meeks; Defensive assistant/quality control – Matt Sheldon; Special teams coaches: Special teams – Bobby April; Strength and conditioning: Strength and conditioning – Chris Clausen; Strength and conditioning – Dana LeDuc

== Roster ==
St. Louis Rams 2001 final roster
Quarterbacks: 10 Marc Bulger; 12 Jamie Martin; 13 Kurt Warner; Running backs: 24 Trung Canidate; 28 Marshall Faulk; 42 James Hodgins FB; 25 Robert Holcombe; 33 Justin Watson FB; Wide receivers: 80 Isaac Bruce; 81 Az-Zahir Hakim; 88 Torry Holt; 83 Yo Murphy; 87 Ricky Proehl; Tight ends: 84 Ernie Conwell; 86 Brandon Manumaleuna	Offensive linemen: 65 Frank Garcia C/G; 60 Rod Jones T; 67 Andy McCollum C; 71 Kaulana Noa G; 61 Tom Nütten G; 76 Orlando Pace T; 73 Cameron Spikes G; 70 John St. Clair T; 62 Adam Timmerman G; 50 Ryan Tucker T; Defensive linemen: 72 Chidi Ahanotu DE; 97 Tyoka Jackson DT; 91 Leonard Little DE; 77 Sean Moran DE; 79 Ryan Pickett DT; 98 Grant Wistrom DE; 66 Brian Young DT; 90 Jeff Zgonina DT	Linebackers: 51 Brian Allen MLB; 57 O. J. Brigance OLB; 56 Dustin Cohen OLB; 58 Don Davis OLB; 55 Mark Fields OLB; 59 London Fletcher MLB; 52 Tommy Polley OLB; Defensive backs: 31 Adam Archuleta SS; 32 Dré Bly CB; 23 Jerametrius Butler; 38 Rich Coady SS; 30 Willie Gary FS; 20 Kim Herring FS; 21 Dexter McCleon CB; 41 Nick Sorensen SS; 35 Aeneas Williams CB; Special teams: 4 John Baker P; 14 Jeff Wilkins K; 45 Jeff Robinson LS	Reserve lists: 89 Damon Griffin WR (IR); 94 Cedric Jones DE (IR); 16 Paul Justin QB (IR); 92 Damione Lewis DT (IR); 22 Jacoby Shepherd CB (IR); Practice squad: 93 Jonathan Brown DE; 54 Troy Evans LB; 19 Sherrod Gideon WR; 65 Mike Newell C; 82 Francis St. Paul WR; 52 active, 5 inactive, 5 practice squad

== Preseason ==
Week	Date	Opponent	Result	Record	Venue
HOF	August 6	vs. Miami Dolphins	W 17–10	1–0	Fawcett Stadium (Canton, Ohio)
1	August 12	at Buffalo Bills	W 24–10	2–0	Ralph Wilson Stadium
2	August 17	Tennessee Titans	L 10–23	2–1	The Dome at America's Center
3	August 25	at San Diego Chargers	L 10–13 (OT)	2–2	Qualcomm Stadium
4	August 31	Kansas City Chiefs	W 21–17	3–2	The Dome at America's Center

== Regular season ==
=== Schedule ===
Week	Date	Opponent	Result	Record	Venue	Recap
1	September 9	at Philadelphia Eagles	**W** 20–17 (OT)	1–0	Veterans Stadium	Recap
2 (Note: The Rams were originally scheduled to host the Atlanta Falcons during Week 2 of the original NFL schedule (September 16) at the Dome at America's Center. However, due to the September 11 attacks, the game was rescheduled to Week 17.)	September 23	at **San Francisco 49ers**	**W** 30–26	2–0	3Com Park at Candlestick Point	Recap
3	September 30	Miami Dolphins	**W** 42–10	3–0	The Dome at America's Center	Recap
4	October 8	at Detroit Lions	**W** 35–0	4–0	Pontiac Silverdome	Recap
5	October 14	New York Giants	**W** 15–14	5–0	The Dome at America's Center	Recap
6	October 21	at New York Jets	**W** 34–14	6–0	Giants Stadium	Recap
7	October 28	**New Orleans Saints**	**L** 31–34	6–1	The Dome at America's Center	Recap
8	Bye					
9	November 11	**Carolina Panthers**	**W** 48–14	7–1	The Dome at America's Center	Recap
10	November 18	at New England Patriots	**W** 24–17	8–1	Foxboro Stadium	Recap
11	November 26	Tampa Bay Buccaneers	**L** 17–24	8–2	The Dome at America's Center	Recap
12	December 2	at **Atlanta Falcons**	**W** 35–6	9–2	Georgia Dome	Recap
13	December 9	**San Francisco 49ers**	**W** 27–14	10–2	The Dome at America's Center	Recap
14	December 17	at **New Orleans Saints**	**W** 34–21	11–2	Louisiana Superdome	Recap
15	December 23	at **Carolina Panthers**	**W** 38–32	12–2	Ericsson Stadium	Recap
16	December 30	Indianapolis Colts	**W** 42–17	13–2	The Dome at America's Center	Recap
17	January 6	**Atlanta Falcons**	**W** 31–13	14–2	The Dome at America's Center	Recap
Note: Intra-division opponents are in **bold** text.

== Postseason ==
Playoff round	Date	Opponent (seed)	Result	Record	Game site	Recap
Wild Card	First-round bye					
Divisional	January 20, 2002	Green Bay Packers (4)	W 45–17	1–0	The Dome at America's Center	Recap
NFC Championship	January 27, 2002	Philadelphia Eagles (3)	W 29–24	2–0	Edward Jones Dome	Recap
Super Bowl XXXVI	February 3, 2002	vs. New England Patriots (A2)	L 17–20	2–1	Louisiana Superdome	Recap

=== Standings ===
NFC West
	W	L	T	PCT	PF	PA	STK
^{(1)} St. Louis Rams	14	2	0	.875	503	273	W6
^{(5)} San Francisco 49ers	12	4	0	.750	409	282	W1
New Orleans Saints	7	9	0	.438	333	409	L4
Atlanta Falcons	7	9	0	.438	291	377	L2
Carolina Panthers	1	15	0	.063	253	410	L15

== Playoffs ==
=== Divisional Round Rams vs. Packers ===
Quarter	1	2	3	4	Total
Packers	7	3	0	7	17
Rams	7	17	14	7	45

at The Dome at America's Center, St. Louis, Missouri

- Game time: 4:00 p.m. EST/3:00 p.m. CST
- Game weather: Played indoors, domed stadium
- Game attendance: 66,338
- Referee: Jeff Triplette
- TV announcers (Fox): Pat Summerall (play-by-play) and John Madden (color commentator)

The matchup between two of the league's highly rated quarterbacks — the Packers' Brett Favre and the Rams Kurt Warner, who shared a combined total of five NFL MVP awards, became lopsided thanks to St. Louis' improved defense, which forced 8 turnovers. Although Favre threw for 281 yards, he tied a playoff record by tossing six interceptions, three of which were returned for touchdowns. The Packers generated most of their offense early in the contest, but the turnovers gave the Rams a 24–10 halftime lead. The Rams then returned two interceptions in the second half to put the game away.

Rams defensive back Aeneas Williams opened up the scoring by returning an interception from Favre 29 yards for a touchdown. The next time Green Bay had the ball, they turned it over again when safety Kim Herring stripped the ball from Ahman Green and rookie Adam Archuleta recovered it. However, the Rams were unable to take advantage of this turnover. A few plays later, Warner's pass was intercepted by Darren Sharper on the Packers 35-yard line. Favre then completed a pair of passes to Corey Bradford and Donald Driver for gains of 27 and 16 yards, before tying the game with a 22-yard touchdown pass to Antonio Freeman. But the Rams stormed right back with a 15-yard completion to Az-Zahir Hakim and a 38-yard burst from running back Marshall Faulk advancing the ball to the Packers 11-yard line. Two plays later, Warner completed a 4-yard touchdown pass to Torry Holt to put the Rams back in the lead. Then on Green Bay's next drive, Herring intercepted a pass from Favre and returned it 45 yards to the Packers 4-yard line, setting up a 4-yard touchdown catch by fullback James Hodgins early in the second quarter. Allen Rossum returned the ensuing kickoff 95 yards for a touchdown, but a holding penalty on Torrance Marshall eliminated the score. Green Bay still managed to score with a Ryan Longwell field goal, but Rams kicker Jeff Wilkins responded with a field goal of his own to give the Rams a 24–10 halftime lead.

In the second half, the Rams scored two touchdowns in a span of 92 seconds. On Green Bay's opening drive, Green's 49-yard run moved the ball into Rams territory. But on the three plays later, Williams stripped the ball from Freeman, dove on it, then got up and returned it for a touchdown. A replay challenge overruled the score, showing Williams was down by contact when he recovered the fumble, but three plays later, Holt's 50-yard reception set up a 7-yard touchdown run by Faulk. Then on Green Bay's next possession, Rams lineman Grant Wistrom deflected a pass from Favre into the arms of linebacker Tommy Polley, who returned the interception 34 yards for a touchdown.

In fourth quarter, the Rams defense scored again with another interception return from Williams, making him the first player ever to return two interceptions for touchdowns in a playoff game. Meanwhile, they managed to pin down the Packers, only allowing a meaningless score on an 8-yard touchdown pass from Favre to Freeman with 5:46 left in the game.

- Scoring
  - STL – Williams 29-yard interception return (Wilkins kick) STL 7–0
  - GB – Freeman 22-yard pass from Favre (Longwell kick) Tie 7–7
  - STL – Holt 4-yard pass from Warner (Wilkins kick) STL 14–7
  - STL – Hodgins 4-yard pass from Warner (Wilkins kick) STL 21–7
  - GB – field goal Longwell 28 yards STL 21–10
  - STL – field goal Wilkins 27 yards STL 24–10
  - STL – Faulk 7-yard run (Wilkins kick) STL 31–10
  - STL – Polley 34-yard interception return (Wilkins kick) STL 38–10
  - STL – Williams 32-yard interception return (Wilkins kick) STL 45–10
  - GB – Freeman 8 yard from Favre (Longwell kick) STL 45–17

=== NFC Championship Game Rams vs. Eagles ===
Quarter	1	2	3	4	Total
Eagles	3	14	0	7	24
Rams	10	3	9	7	29

at Edward Jones Dome, St. Louis, Missouri

- Game time: 4:00 p.m. EST/3:00 p.m. CST
- Game weather: Played indoors, domed stadium
- Game attendance: 66,502
- Referee: Gerald Austin
- TV announcers (Fox): Pat Summerall (play-by-play) and John Madden (color commentator)

Prior to the game, a new naming rights deal was announced as the Rams partnered with Edward Jones Investments. Company logos and signage were added on the field and within the stadium, which was renamed the Edward Jones Dome.

The Eagles had a 17–13 lead at halftime, and had not allowed more than 21 points per game during the season and playoffs. But the Rams roared back thanks to Kurt Warner completing two-thirds of his passes for 212 yards and Marshall Faulk's 159 yards rushing and two touchdowns to earn their second trip to the Super Bowl in three years.

Early in the first quarter, Donovan McNabb fumbled while being sacked by defensive end Leonard Little, and Brian Young recovered for the Rams at the Philadelphia 20-yard line. Five plays later, Warner threw a 5-yard touchdown pass to Isaac Bruce. Philadelphia responded with an 11-play, 50-yard drive, featuring a 20-yard run by Duce Staley, that ended with a 46-yard field goal by David Akers. Rams receiver Yo Murphy returned the ensuing kickoff 43 yards his own 42-yard line before Warner completed a 20-yard pass to Az-Zahir Hakim and Faulk rushed for 15 yards to set up a 27-yard field from Jeff Wilkins, giving the Rams a 10–3 lead.

Early in the second quarter, Wilkins hit the upright on a 53-yard field goal attempt, and the Eagles took over on their 43-yard line. On the next play, rookie running back Correll Buckhalter broke off a 31-yard run to the St. Louis 26. A few plays later, Staley finished the drive with a 1-yard touchdown run to tie the game. But on the Rams next drive, a 31-yard run by Faulk set up 39-yard field goal by Wilkins, and the Rams retook the lead. But they didn't hold it. McNabb responded with 2 completions to James Thrash for 27 yards and a 12-yard throw to Chad Lewis before throwing a 12-yard touchdown pass to Todd Pinkston with 46 seconds left in the half.

But St. Louis dominated the Eagles in third quarter, holding the ball for 12:30 and limiting Philadelphia to just five offensive plays. Murphy fumbled the opening kickoff, but Rams rookie Nick Sorensen recovered it. Following seven runs by Faulk for 27 yards, Warner completed a 21-yard pass to Torry Holt at the Eagles 19-yard line, setting up Wilkins' third field goal to cut their deficit to 17–16. Then after forcing a three-and-out, the Rams drove 71 yards in 10 plays, with Warner completing three passes to Bruce for 44 yards and a 16-yard pass to Holt at the Eagles 9-yard line. Faulk subsequently took the ball into the end zone with three consecutive running plays, giving the Rams a 22–17 lead after tight end Ernie Conwell dropped Warner's pass on a two-point conversion attempt.

Philadelphia went three-and-out again on its next two possessions, and Faulk took advantage of an Eagles' defense that was on the field for most of the second half. On the Rams drive after the second punt, he broke a 25-yard run on third down and 1, caught a 10-yard pass, and then ran for 8 yards before finally scoring a 1-yard touchdown run to increase the Rams lead to 29–17 with 6:55 left in the game. But a 41-yard kickoff return to the Rams 48-yard line from Brian Mitchell sparked an Eagles rally. McNabb led the Eagles 52 yards, completing an 11-yard pass to Chad Lewis on fourth down and 8 and a 17-yard pass to Thrash before taking the ball across the goal line himself on a 3-yard run. After forcing a punt, the Eagles got the ball back on their own 45-yard line with 2:20 left. But on a fourth down and 7 conversion attempt, St. Louis defensive back Aeneas Williams intercepted a pass intended for Freddie Mitchell and the Rams held the ball for the next two minutes, giving the Eagles one more chance to win. Taking a play that the Giants had run against them in Week 16, the Eagles ran a hook and lateral. The Rams quickly stopped the play to win the game.

- Scoring
  - STL – Bruce 5-yard pass from Warner (Wilkins kick) STL 7–0
  - PHI – field goal Akers 46 yards STL 7–3
  - STL – field goal Wilkins 27 yards STL 10–3
  - PHI – Staley 1-yard run (Akers kick) Tie 10–10
  - STL – field goal Wilkins 39 yards STL 13–10
  - PHI – Pinkston 12-yard pass from McNabb (Akers kick) PHI 17–13
  - STL – field goal Wilkins 41 yards PHI 17–16
  - STL – Faulk 1-yard run (Two-point conversion failed) STL 22–17
  - STL – Faulk 1-yard run (Wilkins kick) STL 29–17
  - PHI – McNabb 3-yard run (Akers kick) STL 29–24

=== Super Bowl XXXVI St. Louis Rams vs. New England Patriots ===
Quarter	1	2	3	4	Total
Rams	3	0	0	14	17
Patriots	0	14	3	3	20

at the Louisiana Superdome, New Orleans, Louisiana

- Game time: 6:30 p.m. EST
- Game weather: Played indoors, domed stadium
- Game attendance: 72,922
- Referee: Bernie Kukar
- TV announcers (Fox): Pat Summerall (play-by-play), John Madden (color commentator), Ron Pitts, and Pam Oliver (sideline reporters)

The Patriots dispensed with the traditional individual player introductions, choosing to enter the stadium as a team. Even though the Rams outgained the Patriots 427–267 in total yards, New England forced three turnovers and converted them into 17 points, while committing no turnovers themselves.

The Rams scored first midway through the first quarter, driving 48 yards in 10 plays to set up a 50-yard field goal by kicker Jeff Wilkins. The rest of the quarter was scoreless as both teams' defenses took control. Early in the second quarter, the Rams drove to New England's 34-yard line, but quarterback Kurt Warner threw an incompletion on third down, and Wilkins' subsequent 52-yard field goal attempt sailed wide left.

In the second quarter, with 8:49 left on the clock, New England defensive back Ty Law intercepted a pass intended for receiver Isaac Bruce and took off for a 47-yard touchdown return to give the Patriots a 7–3 lead. With less than two minutes left in the first half, Warner completed a pass to receiver Ricky Proehl at the Patriots 40-yard line, but New England defensive back Antwan Harris forced a fumble while tackling him. Patriots defensive back Terrell Buckley recovered the ball. New England quarterback Tom Brady would lead a drive that culminated with an 8-yard touchdown pass to receiver David Patten with just 31 seconds left in the half to give New England a 14–3 halftime lead. It was the first time during the entire season that St. Louis fell behind in a game by more than eight points.

The Patriots took the opening kickoff of the second half, but could only reach the St. Louis 43-yard line before being forced to punt. Aided by a 20-yard reception by wide receiver Az-Zahir Hakim, a 22-yard reception by Bruce, and a defensive pass interference penalty on Patriots defensive back Otis Smith, the Rams advanced to the New England 41-yard line. But on the next play, linebacker Mike Vrabel and defensive lineman Richard Seymour sacked Warner for a 9-yard loss. Warner then threw 2 consecutive incomplete passes, forcing the Rams to punt.

Later in the third quarter, Smith intercepted a pass intended for Rams wide receiver Torry Holt after Holt slipped while coming off the line of scrimmage, and returned the ball 30 yards to the Rams 33-yard line. St. Louis' defense kept the Patriots out of the end zone, but kicker Adam Vinatieri made a 37-yard field goal to increase New England's lead to 17–3.

The Rams responded by driving to the Patriots' 3-yard line on their ensuing drive. On fourth-and-goal, the Rams decided to go for the touchdown with a quarterback sneak by Warner. However, Warner fumbled the ball while being tackled by linebacker Roman Phifer. Defensive back Tebucky Jones recovered the fumble and returned it 97 yards for an apparent touchdown that would have increased the Patriots lead to 24–3. However, the play was nullified by a holding penalty on linebacker Willie McGinest, giving the Rams a first down on the 1-yard line instead. New England kept the Rams out of the end zone for one more play, but Warner scored on a second down, 2-yard touchdown run to cut the deficit to 17–10.

After Warner's touchdown, the Rams defense forced the Patriots to a three-and-out. St. Louis then drove from their own 7-yard line to the New England 36-yard line, aided by a 30-yard reception by Proehl. However, McGinest sacked Warner for a 16-yard loss on second down, pushing the Rams back to their 46-yard line. St. Louis ended up punting after Warner's third down pass was incomplete.

The Rams forced New England to another three-and-out, and they got the ball back on their own 45-yard line with 1:51 left in the game. Warner threw three consecutive completions: an 18-yard pass to Hakim, an 11-yard one to receiver Yo Murphy, and finally a 26-yard touchdown completion to Proehl to tie the game 17–17 with 1:30 left in the fourth quarter.

The Patriots had no timeouts left for their ensuing drive, causing color commentator John Madden to famously declare that the Patriots should run out the clock and go to overtime. Instead, New England decided to go for the win, as Brady opened the drive with three completions to running back J.R. Redmond, which moved the ball to their 41-yard line with 33 seconds left. After an incomplete pass, Brady completed a 23-yard pass to wide receiver Troy Brown, and followed it up with a 6-yard completion to tight end Jermaine Wiggins to advance to the Rams' 30-yard line. Brady then spiked the ball with seven seconds left, setting up Vinatieri's 48-yard field goal attempt. Vinatieri's game-winning kick sailed through the uprights as time expired, marking the first time in Super Bowl history that a game had been won by a score on the final play.

Warner finished the game with 28 completions out of 44 passes for 365 yards, 1 touchdown, and 2 interceptions, and rushed 3 times for 6 yards and a touchdown. Warner's 365 passing yards were the second highest total in Super Bowl history behind his own record of 414 yards set in Super Bowl XXXIV. Hakim was the top receiver of the game with 5 catches for 90 yards, and also rushed once for 5 yards. Rams running back Marshall Faulk led the team with 76 rushing yards, and also caught 4 passes for 54 yards. Patriots running back Antowain Smith was the top rusher of the game with 92 yards, and caught a pass for 4 yards. Troy Brown was the Patriots leading receiver with 6 catches for 89 yards, a 15-yard kickoff return, and a 4-yard punt return, giving him 108 total yards.

- Scoring
  - STL – field goal Wilkins 50 yards STL 3–0
  - NWE – Law 47-yard interception return (Vinatieri kick) NWE 7–3
  - NWE – Patten 8-yard pass from Brady (Vinatieri kick) NWE 14-3
  - NWE – field goal Vinatieri 37 yards NWE 17-3
  - STL – Warner 2-yard run (Wilkins kick) NWE 17-10
  - STL - Proehl 26-yard pass from Warner (Wilkins kick) Tie 17-17
  - NWE – field goal Vinatieri 48 yards NWE 20-17

== Awards and records ==
- Marshall Faulk, Bert Bell Award
- Marshall Faulk, Daniel F. Reeves Memorial Award
- Marshall Faulk, NFL Offensive Player of the Year Award
- Marshall Faulk, All-Pro Selection
- Marshall Faulk, Pro Bowl Selection
- Kurt Warner, NFL Most Valuable Player
- Kurt Warner, Pro Bowl Selection
- Kurt Warner, All-Pro Selection
- Isaac Bruce, Pro Bowl Selection
- Torry Holt, Pro Bowl Selection
- Aeneas Williams, All-Pro Selection
- Aeneas Williams, Pro Bowl Selection
- Orlando Pace, All-Pro Selection
- Orlando Pace, Pro Bowl Selection
- Adam Timmerman, Pro Bowl Selection
