= 2002 St. Louis Rams season =

NFL team season

- Owner: Georgia Frontiere
- Head coach: Mike Martz
- Home stadium: Edward Jones Dome

Results
- Record: 7–9
- Division place: 2nd NFC West
- Playoffs: Did not qualify
- Pro Bowlers: RB Marshall Faulk; LT Orlando Pace

The 2002 season was the St. Louis Rams' 65th in the National Football League (NFL), their eighth in St. Louis and their third under head coach Mike Martz.

Fresh off their trip from Super Bowl XXXVI which ended with a loss to the 11–5 Patriots, the Rams collapsed and missed the playoffs for the first time since 1998, losing their first five games.

The season saw the emergence of new quarterback Marc Bulger, who filled in for an injured Kurt Warner and Jamie Martin. The Rams won six straight games where Bulger started and finished, but his season ended in Week 16 at Seattle.

However, the Rams did end the season on a high note with a 31–20 victory at home against the 49ers in Week 17 and they finished the season with a 7–9 record.

== History ==
Beginning in the offseason before the 1999 season, the Rams traded for Marshall Faulk, a running back. They then signed the quarterback, Trent Green and drafted a young wide receiver prospect, Torry Holt thereby making significant changes to their front line. Unfortunately, Green experienced a season-ending injury which brought in Kurt Warner, a relatively unknown player with little experience in the NFL

The injury marked the decline of Kurt Warner and the end of the so called "Greatest Show On Turf." This also marked the first season where the Rams did not make the playoffs under Mike Martz.

Star running back Marshall Faulk started in just 10 games due to ankle injury he suffered against San Diego. This weakened the Rams' running game and he finished the season with just 953 yards rushing, his lowest since 1996, where he rushed for 587 yards. At that time, he was a member of the Indianapolis Colts. His 953 rushing yards this season ended his streak of five straight 1,000 yard rushing seasons. Despite a down year, Faulk was still voted to play in the Pro Bowl after the season for the seventh and final time in his Hall of Fame career.

For the season, the team changed their uniforms, removing the side panels on the jersey.

== Offseason ==
| Additions | Subtractions |
|---|---|
| FS Chad Cota (Colts) | T Ryan Tucker (Browns) |
| FB Chris Hetherington (Panthers) | S Rich Coady (Titans) |
| WR Terrence Wilkins (Colts) | LB Mark Fields (Panthers) |
| LB Jamie Duncan (Buccaneers) | LB London Fletcher (Bills) |
| WR Troy Edwards (Steelers) | WR Az-Zahir Hakim (Lions) |
| P Mitch Berger (Vikings) | RB Robert Holcombe (Titans) |
| | TE/LS Jeff Robinson (Cowboys) |
| | DE Sean Moran (49ers) |

=== 2002 expansion draft ===
St. Louis Rams selected during the expansion draft
| Round | Overall | Name | Position | Expansion team |
|---|---|---|---|---|
| —— | 18 | Brian Allen | Linebacker | Houston Texans |

=== Draft ===
2002 St. Louis Rams draft
| Round | Pick | Player | Position | College | Notes |
| 1 | 31 | Robert Thomas | LB | UCLA | |
| 2 | 64 | Travis Fisher | CB | Central Florida | |
| 3 | 84 | Lamar Gordon | RB | North Dakota State | |
| 3 | 95 | Eric Crouch | WR | Nebraska | |
| 4 | 130 | Travis Scott | G | Arizona St | |
| 5 | 167 | Courtland Bullard | LB | Ohio St | |
| 6 | 205 | Steve Bellisari | QB | Ohio St | |
| 7 | 243 | Chris Massey | FB | Marshall | |
Made roster † Pro Football Hall of Fame * Made at least one Pro Bowl during career

=== Undrafted free agents ===
2002 undrafted free agents of note
| Player | Position | College |
|---|---|---|
| James Broyles | Guard | Southwest Missouri State |
| Alonzo Cunningham | Guard | Iowa |
| Maurice Douglas | Running back | Northwest Missouri State |
| Marques Glaze | Running back | Bloomsburg |
| Todd Howard | Cornerback | Michigan |
| Andy King | Guard | Illinois State |
| Michael Malan | Running back | Brown |

== Roster ==
2002 St. Louis Rams roster
| Quarterbacks (QB): 10 Marc Bulger; 4 Scott Covington; 12 Jamie Martin; Running backs (RB): 24 Trung Canidate; 28 Marshall Faulk; 34 Lamar Gordon; 44 Chris Hetherington FB; 42 James Hodgins FB; 25 J. R. Niklos FB; Wide receivers (WR): 80 Isaac Bruce; 88 Troy Edwards; 81 Torry Holt; 89 Dane Looker; 87 Ricky Proehl; 18 Terrence Wilkins; Tight ends (TE): 84 Ernie Conwell; 86 Brandon Manumaleuna | Offensive linemen (OL): 60 James Broyles G; 50 Andy Eby G; 65 Frank Garcia C; 63 Heath Irwin; 68 Andy King G; 67 Andy McCollum C; 76 Orlando Pace T; 70 John St. Clair T; 62 Adam Timmerman G; Defensive linemen (DL): 94 Bryce Fisher DE; 97 Tyoka Jackson DE; 92 Damione Lewis DT; 91 Leonard Little DE; 79 Ryan Pickett DT; 98 Grant Wistrom DE; 66 Brian Young DT; 90 Jeff Zgonina DT | Linebackers (LB): 53 Hakim Akbar MLB; 57 O. J. Brigance OLB; 51 Courtland Bullard OLB; 58 Don Davis OLB; 59 Jamie Duncan MLB; 52 Tommy Polley OLB; 55 Robert Thomas OLB; Defensive backs (DB): 31 Adam Archuleta SS; 32 Dré Bly CB; 23 Jerametrius Butler CB; 37 Chad Cota SS; 22 Travis Fisher CB; 20 Kim Herring FS; 21 Dexter McCleon CB; 41 Nick Sorensen SS; 27 James Whitley CB; Special teams (ST): 17 Mitch Berger P; 45 Chris Massey LS; 14 Jeff Wilkins K | Practice squad: 49 Dauntae Finger TE; 75 Robert Haws T; 15 Ryan Helming QB; 73 Gary Hobbs G; 39 Todd Howard CB; Reserve: 54 Kole Ayi LB (IR); 30 Steve Bellisari S (IR); 61 Tom Nütten G (IR); 64 Travis Scott G (IR); 13 Kurt Warner QB (IR); 35 Aeneas Williams CB (IR); 77 Grant Williams T (IR); Rookies in italics 53 active, 7 reserve, 5 practice squad |

== Regular season ==
=== Schedule ===
| Week | Date | Opponent | Result | Record | Venue | Attendance |
|---|---|---|---|---|---|---|
| 1 | September 8 | at Denver Broncos | **L** 16–23 | 0–1 | Invesco Field | 75,710 |
| 2 | September 15 | New York Giants | **L** 21–26 | 0–2 | Edward Jones Dome | 65,932 |
| 3 | September 23 | at Tampa Bay Buccaneers | **L** 14–26 | 0–3 | Raymond James Stadium | 65,652 |
| 4 | September 29 | Dallas Cowboys | **L** 10–13 | 0–4 | Edward Jones Dome | 66,165 |
| 5 | October 6 | at **San Francisco 49ers** | **L** 13–37 | 0–5 | 3Com Park | 67,853 |
| 6 | October 13 | Oakland Raiders | **W** 28–13 | 1–5 | Edward Jones Dome | 66,070 |
| 7 | October 20 | **Seattle Seahawks** | **W** 37–20 | 2–5 | Edward Jones Dome | 65,931 |
| 8 | Bye | | | | | |
| 9 | November 3 | at **Arizona Cardinals** | **W** 27–14 | 3–5 | Sun Devil Stadium | 47,819 |
| 10 | November 10 | San Diego Chargers | **W** 28–24 | 4–5 | Edward Jones Dome | 66,093 |
| 11 | November 18 | Chicago Bears | **W** 21–16 | 5–5 | Edward Jones Dome | 66,250 |
| 12 | November 24 | at Washington Redskins | **L** 17–20 | 5–6 | FedExField | 79,823 |
| 13 | December 1 | at Philadelphia Eagles | **L** 3–10 | 5–7 | Veterans Stadium | 65,552 |
| 14 | December 8 | at Kansas City Chiefs | **L** 10–49 | 5–8 | Arrowhead Stadium | 78,601 |
| 15 | December 15 | **Arizona Cardinals** | **W** 30–28 | 6–8 | Edward Jones Dome | 65,939 |
| 16 | December 22 | at **Seattle Seahawks** | **L** 10–30 | 6–9 | Seahawks Stadium | 63,953 |
| 17 | December 30 | **San Francisco 49ers** | **W** 31–20 | 7–9 | Edward Jones Dome | 66,118 |
Note: Intra-division opponents are in **bold** text.

=== Game summaries ===
==== Week 7: vs. Seattle Seahawks ====
Week 7: Seattle Seahawks (1–4) at St. Louis Rams (1–5) – Game summary

| Quarter | 1 | 2 | 3 | 4 | Total |
|---|---|---|---|---|---|
| Seahawks | 0 | 14 | 0 | 6 | **20** |
| **Rams** | 7 | 6 | 10 | 14 | **37** |

at Edward Jones Dome, St. Louis, Missouri

- Date: October 20
- Game time: 12:02pm local
- Game weather: indoors
- Game attendance: 65,931
- Referee: Terry McAulay
- TV announcers (Fox): Scott Graham, Sean Jones, Martin Kilcoyne
- Gamecenter, Gamebook

Game information

**First quarter**

- STL – Marshall Faulk 6-yard pass from Marc Bulger (Jeff Wilkins kick), 6:00 (STL 7–0)

**Second quarter**

- STL – Jeff Wilkins 31-yard field goal, 7:11 (STL 10–0)
- SEA – Koren Robinson 79-yard pass from Trent Dilfer (Rian Lindell kick), 6:51 (STL 10–7)
- STL – Jeff Wilkins 45-yard field goal, 0:29 (STL 13–7)
- SEA – Maurice Morris 97-yard kickoff return (Rian Lindell kick), 0:16 (SEA 14–13)

**Third quarter**

- STL – Marshall Faulk 3-yard run (Jeff Wilkins kick), 5:08 (STL 20–14)
- STL – Jeff Wilkins 47-yard field goal, 3:23 (STL 23–14)

**Fourth quarter**

- STL – Marshall Faulk 2-yard run (Jeff Wilkins kick), 12:12 (STL 30–14)
- STL – Marshall Faulk 1-yard run (Jeff Wilkins kick), 6:05 (STL 37–14)
- SEA – Chad Eaton 1-yard fumble return (PAT failed), 3:28 (STL 37–20)

**Top passers**

- SEA – Trent Dilfer: 8/25, 232 yds, 1 TD, 2 INT
- STL – Marc Bulger: 22/40, 265 yds, 1 TD, 1 INT

**Top rushers**

- SEA – Shaun Alexander: 12 car, 30 yds
- STL – Marshall Faulk: 32 car, 183 yds, 3 TD

**Top receivers**

- SEA – Koren Robinson: 3 rec, 166 yds, 1 TD
- STL – Torry Holt: 3 rec, 71 yds

**Team** – pass – rush – total – to

- SEA – 240 – 50 – 290 – 3
- STL – 260 – 218 – 478 – 2

==== Week 9: vs. St. Louis Rams ====
Week 9: St. Louis Rams (2–5) at Arizona Cardinals (4–3) – Game summary

| Quarter | 1 | 2 | 3 | 4 | Total |
|---|---|---|---|---|---|
| **Rams** | 7 | 10 | 0 | 10 | **27** |
| Cardinals | 0 | 7 | 0 | 7 | **14** |

at Sun Devil Stadium, Tempe, Arizona

- Date: November 3
- Game time: 2:15 p.m. MST
- Game weather: 76 °F (24 °C)
- Game attendance: 47,819
- Referee: Ron Blum
- TV announcers (FOX): Curt Menefee, Tim Ryan
- Box Score

Game information

**First quarter**

- STL – Ricky Proehl 31-yard pass from Marc Bulger (Jeff Wilkins kick), 11:18. Rams 7–0.

**Second quarter**

- STL – Jeff Wilkins 24-yard field goal, 13:09. Rams 10–0.
- ARI – Frank Sanders 8-yard pass from Jake Plummer (Bill Gramática kick), 2:31. Rams 10–7.
- STL – Torry Holt 7-yard pass from Marc Bulger (Jeff Wilkins kick), 0:53. Rams 17–7.

**Third quarter**

- No scoring plays

**Fourth quarter**

- ARI – Justin Lucas 35-yard interception run (Bill Gramática kick), 10:36. Rams 17–14.
- STL – Jeff Wilkins 42-yard field goal, 3:46. Rams 20–14.
- STL – Marshall Faulk 13-yard run (Jeff Wilkins kick), 1:53. Rams 27–14.

**Top passers**

- STL – Marc Bulger – 20/29, 245 yards, 2 TD, 2 INT
- ARI – Jake Plummer – 19/30, 193 yards, TD, INT

**Top rushers**

- STL – Marshall Faulk – 27 rushes, 178 yards, TD
- ARI – Thomas Jones – 12 rushes, 25 yards

**Top receivers**

- STL – Troy Edwards – 4 receptions, 63 yards
- ARI – Frank Sanders – 6 receptions, 67 yards, TD

**Team** – pass – rush – total – to

- STL – 245 – 192 – 415 – 2
- ARI – 193 – 64 – 235 – 3

==== Week 10: vs. San Diego Chargers ====
Week 10: San Diego Chargers (6–2) at St. Louis Rams (3–5) – Game summary

| Quarter | 1 | 2 | 3 | 4 | Total |
|---|---|---|---|---|---|
| Chargers | 7 | 10 | 7 | 0 | **24** |
| **Rams** | 7 | 0 | 7 | 14 | **28** |

at Edward Jones Dome, St. Louis, Missouri

- Date: November 10
- Game time: 12:00 p.m. CST
- Game weather: N/A (game played indoors)
- Game attendance: 66,093
- Referee: Ed Hochuli
- TV announcers (CBS): Gus Johnson and Brent Jones
- Box score, Game Book

Game information

**First quarter**

- STL – Ernie Conwell 17-yard pass from Marc Bulger (Jeff Wilkins kick), 11:43. Rams 7–0. **Drive: 5 plays, 85 yards, 3:17.**
- SDG – Ryan McNeil 5-yard fumble return (Steve Christie kick), 7:36. Tied 7–7.

**Second quarter**

- SDG – Steve Christie 41-yard field goal, 14:01. Chargers 10–7. **Drive: 12 plays, 52 yards, 6:50.**
- SDG – LaDainian Tomlinson 1-yard run (Steve Christie kick), 8:54. Chargers 17–7. **Drive: 7 plays, 56 yards, 3:26.**

**Third quarter**

- STL – Isaac Bruce 27-yard pass from Marc Bulger (Jeff Wilkins kick), 9:12. Chargers 17–14. **Drive: 6 plays, 87 yards, 2:22.**
- SDG – Donnie Edwards 82-yard fumble return (Steve Christie kick), 5:09. Chargers 24–14.

**Fourth quarter**

- STL – Isaac Bruce 34-yard pass from Marc Bulger (Jeff Wilkins kick), 3:06. Chargers 24–21. **Drive: 6 plays, 94 yards, 1:52.**
- STL – Isaac Bruce 7-yard pass from Marc Bulger (Jeff Wilkins kick), 1:14. Rams 28–24. **Drive: 9 plays, 54 yards, 1:52.**

**Top passers**

- SDG – Drew Brees – 12/20, 139 yards, 2 INT
- STL – Marc Bulger – 36/48, 453 yards, 4 TD

**Top rushers**

- SDG – LaDainian Tomlinson – 24 rushes, 120 yards, TD
- STL – Marshall Faulk – 13 rushes, 36 yards

**Top receivers**

- SDG – Tim Dwight – 4 receptions, 53 yards
- STL – Isaac Bruce – 10 receptions, 163 yards, 3 TD

==== Week 11: vs. Chicago Bears ====
Week 11: Chicago Bears (2–7) at St. Louis Rams (4–5) – Game summary

| Quarter | 1 | 2 | 3 | 4 | Total |
|---|---|---|---|---|---|
| Bears | 0 | 6 | 7 | 3 | **16** |
| **Rams** | 7 | 7 | 0 | 7 | **21** |

at Edward Jones Dome, St. Louis, Missouri

- Date: November 18, 2002
- Game time: 9:00 p.m.
- Game weather: None (indoor stadium)
- Game attendance: 66,250
- Referee: Gerry Austin (34)
- TV announcers (ABC): Al Michaels, John Madden and Melissa Stark
- Recap, Game Book

Game information

**First quarter**

- STL – Ernie Conwell 1-yard run (Jeff Wilkins kick), 10:05. Rams 7–0. **Drive: 10 plays, 65 yards, 4:55.**

**Second quarter**

- CHI – Paul Edinger 37-yard field goal, 14:10. Rams 7–3. **Drive: 13 plays, 66 yards, 6:59.**
- CHI – Paul Edinger 48-yard field goal, 6:15. Rams 7–6. **Drive: 4 plays, 3 yards, 2:08.**
- STL – Lamar Gordon 22-yard pass from Marc Bulger (Jeff Wilkins kick), 0:42. Rams 14–6. **Drive: 4 plays, 81 yards, 0:46.**

**Third quarter**

- CHI – Anthony Thomas 13-yard run (Paul Edinger kick), 9:23. Rams 14–13. **Drive: 11 plays, 64 yards, 5:37.**

**Fourth quarter**

- STL – Ricky Proehl 8-yard pass from Marc Bulger (Jeff Wilkins kick), 9:01. Rams 21–13. **Drive: 10 plays, 82 yards, 5:14.**
- CHI – Paul Edinger 50-yard field goal, 3:48. Rams 21–16. **Drive: 6 plays, 32 yards, 3:04.**

**Top passers**

- CHI – Chris Chandler – 20/33, 157 yards
- STL – Marc Bulger – 21/35, 347 yards, 2 TD, INT

**Top rushers**

- CHI – Anthony Thomas – 14 rushes, 61 yards, TD
- STL – Lamar Gordon – 16 rushes, 45 yards

**Top receivers**

- CHI – Marty Booker – 7 receptions, 65 yards
- STL – Isaac Bruce – 6 receptions, 141 yards

==== Week 14: at Kansas City Chiefs ====
Week 14: St. Louis Rams (5–7) at Kansas City Chiefs (6–6) – Game summary

| Quarter | 1 | 2 | 3 | 4 | Total |
|---|---|---|---|---|---|
| Rams | 10 | 0 | 0 | 0 | **10** |
| **Chiefs** | 14 | 21 | 0 | 14 | **49** |

at Arrowhead Stadium, Kansas City, Missouri

- Date: December 8
- Game time: 12:00 p.m. CST
- Game weather: Mostly cloudy, 38 °F (3 °C)
- Game attendance: 78,601
- Referee: Bill Leavy
- TV announcers (Fox): Sam Rosen, Bill Maas, and Joel Goldberg
- Recap, Game Book

Game information

**First quarter**

- STL – Jeff Wilkins 36-yard field goal, 12:01. Rams 3–0. **Drive: 5 plays, 13 yards, 1:47.**
- KC – Dante Hall 88-yard kickoff return (Morten Andersen kick), 11:49. Chiefs 7–3.
- KC – Duane Clemons 42-yard fumble return (Morten Andersen kick), 10:16. Chiefs 14–3.
- STL – Isaac Bruce 8-yard pass from Jamie Martin (Jeff Wilkins kick), 1:43. Chiefs 14–10. **Drive: 4 plays, 51 yards, 2:05.**

**Second quarter**

- KC – Priest Holmes 2-yard run (Morten Andersen kick), 8:52. Chiefs 21–10. **Drive: 8 plays, 66 yards, 4:56.**
- KC – Dante Hall 86-yard punt return (Morten Andersen kick), 6:58. Chiefs 28–10.
- KC – Priest Holmes 1-yard run (Morten Andersen kick), 1:57. Chiefs 35–10. **Drive: 7 plays, 57 yards, 3:25.**

**Third quarter**

- No scoring plays.

**Fourth quarter**

- KC – Marc Boerigter 6-yard pass from Trent Green (Morten Andersen kick), 9:56. Chiefs 42–10. **Drive: 12 plays, 89 yards, 7:48.**
- KC – Mike Cloud 1-yard run (Morten Andersen kick), 5:24. Chiefs 49–10. **Drive: 7 plays, 56 yards, 3:56.**

**Top passers**

- STL – Jamie Martin – 24/35, 218 yards, TD, 2 INT
- KC – Trent Green – 10/15, 100 yards, TD

**Top rushers**

- STL – Lamar Gordon – 5 rushes, 14 yards
- KC – Priest Holmes – 24 rushes, 132 yards, 2 TD

**Top receivers**

- STL – Isaac Bruce – 5 receptions, 47 yards, TD
- KC – Tony Gonzalez – 5 receptions, 38 yards

==== Week 16: at Seattle Seahawks ====
Week 16: St. Louis Rams (6–8) at Seattle Seahawks (5–9) – Game summary

| Quarter | 1 | 2 | 3 | 4 | Total |
|---|---|---|---|---|---|
| Rams | 0 | 3 | 7 | 0 | **10** |
| **Seahawks** | 3 | 10 | 10 | 7 | **30** |

at Seahawks Stadium, Seattle

- Date: December 22
- Game time: 1:05pm local
- Game weather: cloudy, 45 °F (7 °C), 76% humidity, wind SE 5 miles per hour (8.0 km/h)
- Game attendance: 63,953
- Referee: Mike Carey
- TV announcers (Fox): Kenny Albert, Tim Green & Brent Ringenbach
- Gamecenter, Gamebook

Game information

**First quarter**

- SEA – Rian Lindell 31-yard field goal, 8:46 (SEA 3–0)

**Second quarter**

- SEA – Rian Lindell 36-yard field goal, 12:12 (SEA 6–0)
- STL – Jeff Wilkins 45-yard field goal, 5:43 (SEA 6–3)
- SEA – Shaun Alexander 1-yard run (Rian Lindell kick), 3:43 (SEA 13–3)
- SEA – Shaun Alexander 1-yard run (Rian Lindell kick), 8:58 (SEA 20–3)

**Third quarter**

- STL – Torry Holt 5-yard pass from Jamie Martin (Jeff Wilkins kick), 3:17 (SEA 20–10)
- SEA – Rian Lindell 22-yard field goal, 0:06 (SEA 23–10)

**Fourth quarter**

- SEA – Darrell Jackson 38-yard pass from Matt Hasselbeck (Rian Lindellc kick), 11:16 (SEA 30–10)

**Top passers**

- STL – Jamie Martin: 31/48, 259 yds, 1 TD, 3 INT
- SEA – Matt Hasselbeck: 20/32, 303 yds, 1 TD

**Top rushers**

- STL – Marshall Faulk: 9 car, 13 yds
- SEA – Shaun Alexander: 26 car, 79 yds, 2 TD

**Top receivers**

- STL – Torry Holt: 9 rec, 92 yds, 1 TD
- SEA – Koren Robinson: 4 rec, 94 yds

**Team** – pass – rush – total – to

- STL – 254 – 17 – 271 – 5
- SEA – 292 – 100 – 392 – 1

== Standings ==
=== Division ===
NFC West
| | W | L | T | PCT | DIV | CONF | PF | PA | STK |
|---|---|---|---|---|---|---|---|---|---|
| ^{(4)} San Francisco 49ers | 10 | 6 | 0 | .625 | 5–1 | 8–4 | 367 | 351 | L1 |
| St. Louis Rams | 7 | 9 | 0 | .438 | 4–2 | 5–7 | 316 | 369 | W1 |
| Seattle Seahawks | 7 | 9 | 0 | .438 | 2–4 | 5–7 | 355 | 369 | W3 |
| Arizona Cardinals | 5 | 11 | 0 | .313 | 1–5 | 5–7 | 262 | 417 | L3 |

^{h} St. Louis finished ahead of Seattle in the NFC West based on better division record (4–2 to 2–4).

=== Conference ===
NFC
| # | Team | Division | W | L | T | PCT | DIV | CONF | SOS | SOV |
|---|---|---|---|---|---|---|---|---|---|---|
Division leaders
| 1 (Note: Philadelphia finished ahead of Tampa Bay and Green Bay based on conference record (11–1 vs 9–3/9–3).) | Philadelphia Eagles | East | 12 | 4 | 0 | .750 | 5–1 | 11–1 | .469 | .432 |
| 2 (Note: Tampa Bay finished ahead of Green Bay based on head-to-head victory.) | Tampa Bay Buccaneers | South | 12 | 4 | 0 | .750 | 4–2 | 9–3 | .482 | .432 |
| 3 | Green Bay Packers | North | 12 | 4 | 0 | .750 | 5–1 | 9–3 | .451 | .414 |
| 4 | San Francisco 49ers | West | 10 | 6 | 0 | .625 | 5–1 | 8–4 | .504 | .450 |
Wild Cards
| 5 | New York Giants | East | 10 | 6 | 0 | .625 | 5–1 | 8–4 | .482 | .450 |
| 6 | Atlanta Falcons | South | 9 | 6 | 1 | .594 | 4–2 | 7–5 | .494 | .429 |
Did not qualify for the postseason
| 7 | New Orleans Saints | South | 9 | 7 | 0 | .563 | 3–3 | 7–5 | .498 | .566 |
| 8 (Note: St. Louis finished ahead of Seattle based on division record (4–2 to 2–4).) | St. Louis Rams | West | 7 | 9 | 0 | .438 | 4–2 | 5–7 | .508 | .446 |
| 9 | Seattle Seahawks | West | 7 | 9 | 0 | .438 | 2–4 | 5–7 | .506 | .433 |
| 10 (Note: Washington finished ahead of Carolina based on common games (2–3 to 1–4)) | Washington Redskins | East | 7 | 9 | 0 | .438 | 1–5 | 4–8 | .527 | .438 |
| 11 | Carolina Panthers | South | 7 | 9 | 0 | .438 | 1–5 | 4–8 | .486 | .357 |
| 12 | Minnesota Vikings | North | 6 | 10 | 0 | .375 | 4–2 | 5–7 | .498 | .417 |
| 13 (Note: Arizona finished ahead of Dallas based on head-to-head victory.) | Arizona Cardinals | West | 5 | 11 | 0 | .313 | 1–5 | 5–7 | .500 | .400 |
| 14 | Dallas Cowboys | East | 5 | 11 | 0 | .313 | 1–5 | 3–9 | .500 | .475 |
| 15 | Chicago Bears | North | 4 | 12 | 0 | .250 | 2–4 | 3–9 | .521 | .430 |
| 16 | Detroit Lions | North | 3 | 13 | 0 | .188 | 1–5 | 3–9 | .494 | .375 |
Tiebreakers (Note: When breaking ties for three or more teams under the NFL's rules, they are first broken within divisions, then comparing only the highest-ranked remaining team from each division.)
