= Jeff Wilkins =

American football player (born 1972)

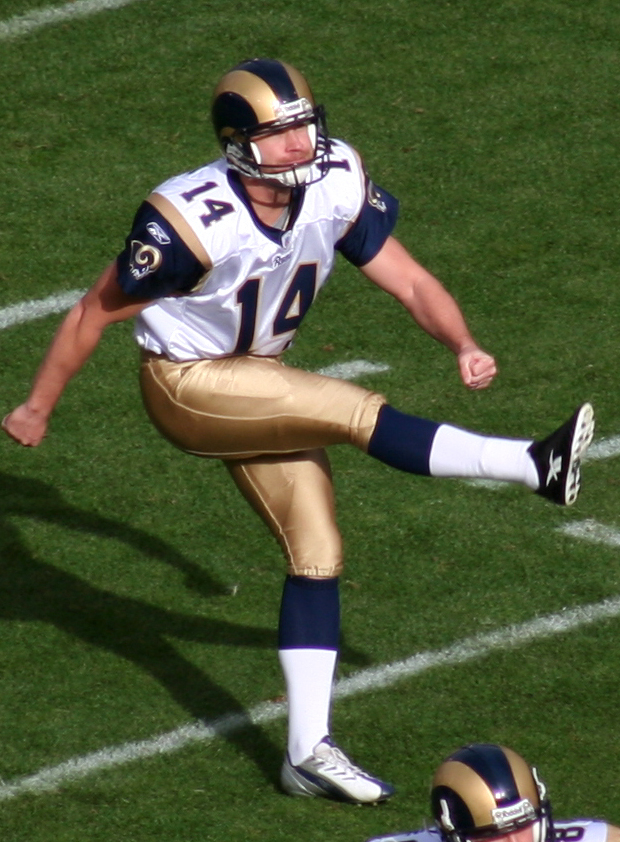
- Wilkins with the St. Louis Rams in 2007

No. 14
- Position: Placekicker

Personal information
- Born: April 19, 1972 (age 54); Youngstown, Ohio, U.S.
- Listed height: 6 ft 2 in (1.88 m)
- Listed weight: 205 lb (93 kg)

Career information
- High school: Austintown Fitch (Austintown, Ohio)
- College: Youngstown State (1990–1993)
- NFL draft: 1994: undrafted

Career history
- Dallas Cowboys (1994)*; Philadelphia Eagles (1994); San Francisco 49ers (1995–1996); St. Louis Rams (1997–2007)
- * Offseason or practice squad member only

Awards and highlights
- Super Bowl champion (XXXIV); Second-team All-Pro (2003); Pro Bowl (2003); NFL scoring leader (2003)

Career NFL statistics
- Field goals attempted: 375
- Field goals made: 307
- Field goal percentage: 81.9%
- Longest field goal: 57
- Extra points attempted: 498
- Extra points made: 495
- Extra point percentage: 99.4%
- Points scored: 1,416
- Stats at Pro Football Reference

Jeffrey Allen Wilkins (born April 19, 1972), nicknamed "Money", is an American former professional football player who was a placekicker for the San Francisco 49ers, Philadelphia Eagles and St. Louis Rams of the National Football League (NFL). With the Rams, he won Super Bowl XXXIV. He played college football for the Youngstown State Penguins. Wilkins is currently tied for second place all-time in most consecutive PATs without a miss at 371.

== Early life ==
Wilkins played for Austintown Fitch High School in the Austintown, Ohio suburb of Youngstown.

== College career ==
At Youngstown State University, Wilkins made a school record 66 field goals, with a long of 54 (a school record). While at Youngstown State, the Penguins won the 1991 and 1993 Division I-AA National Championships under head coach Jim Tressel. Wilkins was inducted in the YSU Sports Hall of Fame in 2003.

== Professional career ==
Wilkins signed with the Philadelphia Eagles in 1994, but played in just six games and did not attempt a single field goal or extra point. The following season, he joined the 49ers. While he only played in seven games, he had a superb season, kicking 12 of 13 field goals. In 1996, he finally saw duty as his team's full-time kicker and did not disappoint, kicking 30 of 34 field goals and all 40 extra point attempts.

In 1997, he joined the Rams, where he played the remainder of his career and became the team's all-time leading scorer. Wilkins assisted his team to a championship win in Super Bowl XXXIV, kicking three of four field goals and two extra points in the Rams 23–16 win over the Tennessee Titans. He also kicked a 50-yard field goal in the Rams 20–17 loss in Super Bowl XXXVI.

Some consider Wilkins to be the last player to kick barefoot in the NFL, doing so for the first seven games of the 2002 season. However, many years later, Wilkins told ESPN writer Sam Borden that he did not consider himself to have been a barefoot kicker because his kicking foot was heavily taped as a short-lived attempt to fix his kicking woes.

In 2003, Wilkins kicked an NFL record-tying 39 field goals (then shared with former Miami Dolphins, New Orleans Saints, Seattle Seahawks and Chicago Bears kicker Olindo Mare), which stood until surpassed by Neil Rackers' 40 field goals in 2005.

In St. Louis' opening game of the 2006 season, Wilkins set a franchise record by kicking six field goals in their 18–10 win over the Denver Broncos. He also became the first Rams player ever to score over 1,000 points.

On November 11, 2007, Wilkins kicked his 300th career field goal against the New Orleans Saints. Wilkins announced his retirement from the NFL on February 29, 2008.

== NFL career statistics ==
Year	Team	GP	Field goals				Extra points			Points
Year	Team	GP	FGA	FGM	Lng	Pct	XPA	XPM	Pct	Points
1994	PHI	6	0	0	—	—	0	0	—	0
1995	SF	7	13	12	40	92.3	29	27	93.1	63
1996	SF	16	34	30	49	88.2	40	40	100.0	130
1997	STL	16	37	25	52	67.6	32	32	100.0	107
1998	STL	16	26	20	57	76.9	26	25	96.2	85
1999	STL	16	28	20	51	71.4	64	64	100.0	124
2000	STL	11	17	17	51	100.0	38	38	100.0	89
2001	STL	16	29	23	54	79.3	58	58	100.0	127
2002	STL	16	25	19	47	76.0	37	37	100.0	94
2003	STL	16	42	39	53	92.9	46	46	100.0	163
2004	STL	16	24	19	53	79.2	32	32	100.0	89
2005	STL	16	31	27	53	87.1	36	36	100.0	117
2006	STL	16	37	32	53	86.5	35	35	100.0	131
2007	STL	16	32	24	53	75.0	25	25	100.0	97
Career		200	375	307	57	81.9	498	495	99.4	1,416
