= Adam Archuleta =

American football player (born 1977)

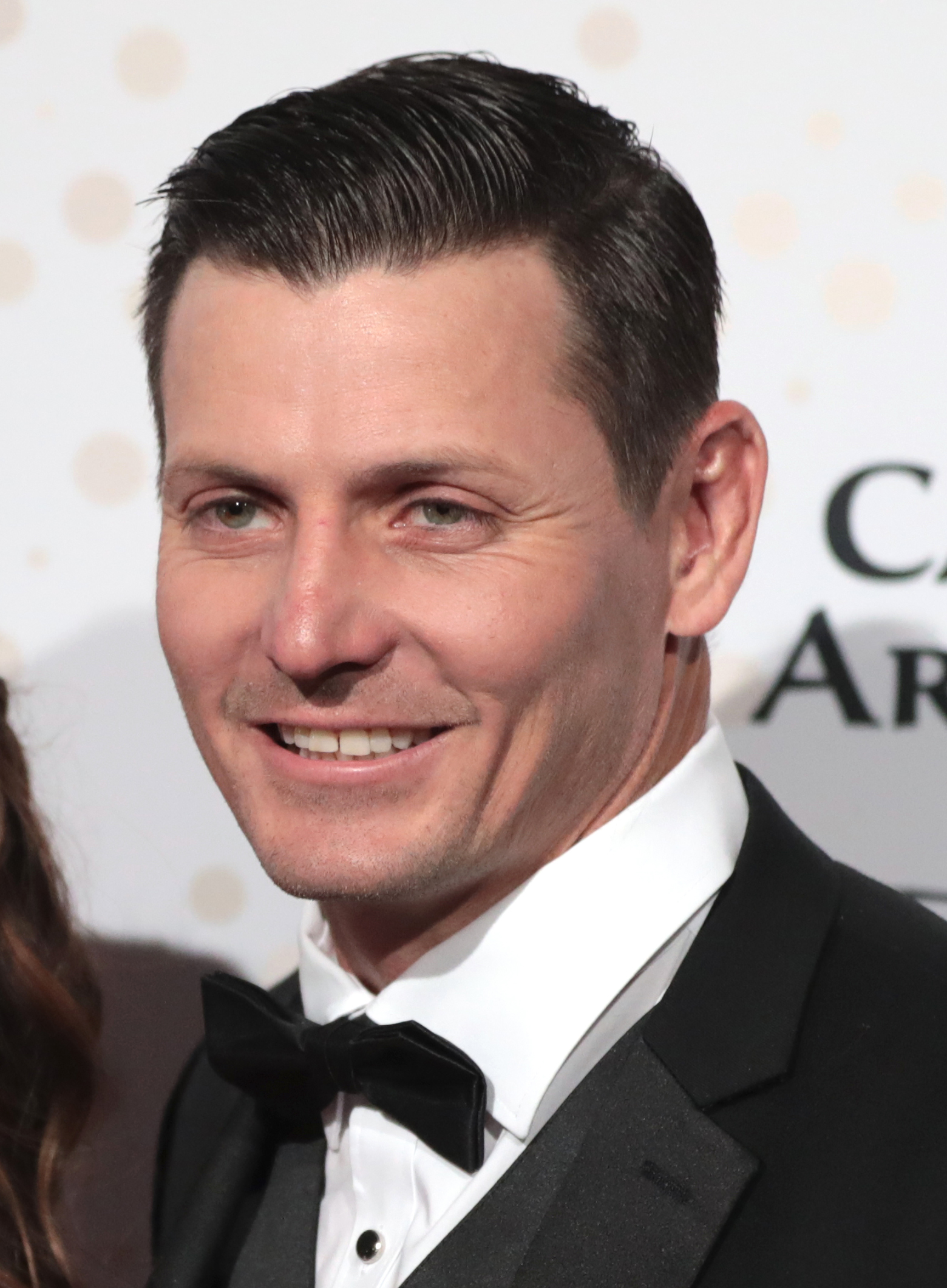
- Archuleta in 2023

No. 31, 40, 20
- Position: Safety

Personal information
- Born: November 27, 1977 (age 48); Rock Springs, Wyoming, U.S.
- Listed height: 5 ft 11 in (1.80 m)
- Listed weight: 215 lb (98 kg)

Career information
- High school: Chandler (Chandler, Arizona)
- College: Arizona State (1996–2000)
- NFL draft: 2001: 1st round, 20th overall pick

Career history
- St. Louis Rams (2001–2005); Washington Redskins (2006); Chicago Bears (2007); Oakland Raiders (2008)*
- * Offseason or practice squad member only

Awards and highlights
- PFWA All-Rookie Team (2001); St. Louis Rams 10th Anniversary Team; Second-team All-American (2000); Pac-10 Defensive Player of the Year (2000); 2× First-team All-Pac-10 (1999, 2000)

Career NFL statistics
- Total tackles: 530
- Sacks: 18
- Forced fumbles: 4
- Fumble recoveries: 6
- Interceptions: 4
- Defensive touchdowns: 3
- Stats at Pro Football Reference

Adam Jason Archuleta (born November 27, 1977) is an American former professional football player who was a safety for seven seasons in the National Football League (NFL). He played college football for the Arizona State Sun Devils, and was selected in the first round of the 2001 NFL draft by the St. Louis Rams with the 20th overall pick.

After five seasons with the Rams, Archuleta played a season each for the Washington Redskins and Chicago Bears, and was in camp with the Oakland Raiders in 2008.

== Early life ==
Born in Rock Springs, Wyoming, Archuleta attended Chandler High School in Chandler, Arizona, a suburb southeast of Phoenix. He was a letterman in football in which he was a two-time first-team All-Central Region honoree and a two-time All-State Honorable Mention honoree. Jerry Loper was his high school head football coach.

== College career ==
Archuleta played college football at nearby Arizona State University, where he started three years as a linebacker. Initially without a scholarship, he redshirted as a true freshman in 1996 after making the team as a walk-on.

Archuleta played in every game during his redshirt freshman season in 1997 as a reserve inside linebacker, recording 17 tackles (11 solos) while appearing mostly on special teams.

He moved into the starting lineup as a sophomore at weakside linebacker, playing in every game in 1998 and finished with 75 tackles (39 solos), five sacks and 18 stops for losses. As a junior in 1999, he was named to the All-Pac-10 Conference First Team as well as team most valuable player. He started the final eleven games at weakside outside linebacker and led the team with 111 tackles (59 solos) with five sacks and 21 stops for losses.

As a senior in 2000, he was named the Pac-10 Defensive Player of the Year and was a First-team All-Pac-10 Conference selection as a linebacker. He also was one of three finalists for the Butkus Award, given annually to the top linebacker in college football. As a senior, he started at weakside outside linebacker and led ASU with a career-high 127 tackles (93 solos) with four sacks and 15 stops for losses. He was a First-team All-America selection by The Sports Xchange and earned Second-team All-American from the Walter Camp Foundation.

During his four-year career Archuleta ranks fourth in school history with 54 stops behind the line of scrimmage while recording 330 tackles (202 solos) with 14 quarterback sacks, six fumble recoveries and five forced fumbles.

== Professional career ==
=== Pre-draft ===
Pre-draft measurables
Height	Weight	Arm length	Hand span	40-yard dash	Bench press
5 ft 11 7/8 in (1.83 m)	211 lb (96 kg)	30 1/2 in (0.77 m)	7 3/4 in (0.20 m)	4.46 s	31 reps
All values from NFL Combine

=== St. Louis Rams ===
The St. Louis Rams drafted Archuleta in the first round with the 20th overall selection in the 2001 NFL draft. He spent his first five years in St. Louis, where he excelled in Lovie Smith's Cover 2 base defense. He signed a five-year $7 million contract with the Rams, with a signing bonus of $3 million.

In 2001 Archuleta was named to All-rookie teams by The Football News and Pro Football Weekly after playing in 13 games and starting 12 at strong safety. He finished sixth on the Rams with 81 tackles (43 solo) and tied for second with seven tackles for loss while notching two sacks, five passes defensed, two forced fumbles and one fumble recovery. In 2002, he started all 16 contests, 15 at strong safety, one at weakside linebacker and he led team with 149 tackles (101 solo) with 2.5 sacks, one interception, four passes defensed, three QB pressures, one fumble recovery, three tackles for loss, and eight special teams tackles. In 2003, he started 13 games at strong safety and had his second consecutive 100-plus tackle season, collecting 101 stops (77 solo) and had five sacks, five tackles for loss, one interception, eight passes defensed, nine QB pressures, one forced fumble, and one fumble recovery. His Five sacks led all NFL defensive backs in 2003, was the most sacks by an NFL defensive back since 2000. He was also named NFC Defensive Player of the Month for November 2003.

In 2004 Archuleta played in all 16 regular season games, starting 14, and started both playoff games despite being hampered by a back injury. He had his third consecutive 100-plus tackle season, collecting 123 tackles (73 solo) and had two sacks, five tackles for loss, three passes defensed, one forced fumble, one fumble recovery, and nine special teams tackles. He earned Co-"Horse Trailer Player of the Game" honors (along with Torry Holt) for his performance on Monday Night Football vs. Tampa Bay Buccaneers 10/18, as he collected six tackles (three solo) and forced Bucs' RB Michael Pittman to fumble, recovering the fumble, and returned it 93 yards for a touchdown. Had 10 tackles (six solo), and earned NFC Special Teams Player of the Week honors with two solo special teams tackles vs. Seattle Seahawks November 14, 2004. In 2005 Archuleta appeared in and started 14 games and collected 93 tackles (66 solo), 3.5 sacks, five pass deflections and one interception. In Week 3 against the Tennessee Titans, he intercepted a pass and returned it 85 yards for a touchdown. He also recorded six tackles, all solo, in that game. A month later, in Week 7 vs. New Orleans Saints, he recorded two sacks, seven tackles (six solo) and logged a fumble recovery.

=== Washington Redskins ===
After the 2005 season ended, he was one of the most sought after free agent safeties. The Redskins made him the highest paid safety, up to that point, in NFL history by signing Archuleta to a six-year, $30 million contract (with approximately $10 million guaranteed) on March 14, 2006. Archuleta started at strong safety for 7 of 16 games played with the Redskins, registering 50 tackles and one sack to go along with career-high 17 special teams tackles. He appeared in all 16 regular season contests for the third time in his career, registering a sack for sixth consecutive season, the longest active streak for an NFL safety. However, after struggles in the deep passing game for the Redskins, Archuleta was replaced at the strong safety position with Troy Vincent, and played only on special teams the last half of the season. On December 28, 2006, Archuleta expressed his displeasure with the way the Redskins were using him, and the lack of communication from the coaching staff, under head coach Joe Gibbs.

=== Chicago Bears ===
On March 20, 2007, the Redskins traded Archuleta to the Chicago Bears for their sixth round selection in the upcoming 2007 NFL draft. The Bears agreed to pay him $8.1 million over three years. Archuleta was reunited with Lovie Smith, but never lived up to the expectations the team had for him during the 2007 season. Archuleta played 15 games with only ten starts and he intercepted a pass, forced a fumble and recovered a fumble. He knocked down three passes and had 61 tackles, numbers that were below his career averages. The Bears released him on May 6, 2008. In his season with the Bears, Archuleta was paid $5.1 million of his contract, which the Bears picked up from the Redskins.

=== Oakland Raiders ===
On August 11, 2008, the Oakland Raiders signed Archuleta with the intention of moving him to linebacker. He was released on August 30 in final roster cuts, to comply with the 53-man roster requirement.

== Post NFL ==
Archuleta is a local and national sports commentator for ESPN, Fox, and CBS, and was inducted into ASU's Sports Hall of Fame in 2011.

Archuleta joined the new Pac-12 Network in 2012 as a game analyst for college football telecasts. After one season Archuleta joined CBS Sports Network as an analyst for Conference USA and Mountain West Conference games; despite declining to play for the UFL, he did call the league's games when they aired on CBS Sports Network in 2012. He also joined the NFL on CBS in 2013 as a game analyst alongside Andrew Catalon, in 2014-16 alongside Tom McCarthy, in 2021–22 with Greg Gumbel, and in 2017–19, and 2023 alongside Spero Dedes, replacing Randy Cross.

As of the 2023 season, Archuleta is partnered with Spero Dedes.

== NFL statistics ==
Year	Team	Games		Tackles				Fumbles				Interceptions					
Year	Team	G	GS	Comb	Total	Ast	Sack	FF	FR	Yds	FT	Int	Yds	Avg	Lng	TD	PD
2001	STL	13	12	56	47	9	2.0	1	1	24	0	0	0	0	0	0	3
2002	STL	16	16	116	102	14	2.5	0	1	0	0	1	2	2	2	0	5
2003	STL	13	13	79	72	7	5.0	1	1	45	1	1	22	22	22	0	7
2004	STL	16	14	88	75	13	2.0	1	1	93	1	0	0	0	0	0	3
2005	STL	14	14	70	53	17	3.5	0	1	0	0	1	85	85	85	1	4
2006	WAS	16	7	60	49	11	1.0	0	0	0	0	0	0	0	0	0	1
2007	CHI	15	10	61	54	7	2.0	1	1	0	0	1	4	4	4	0	2
Career		103	86	530	452	78	18.0	4	6	162	2	4	113	28.25	85	1	25

== Personal life ==
Archuleta married Playboy Playmate Jennifer Walcott in 2010. They had their first child, a son, on April 10, 2008. The family was featured on an episode of Football Wives on E! True Hollywood Story in 2009. He was also featured in Moves magazine alongside his wife, Jennifer.
