= Kim Herring =

American football player (born 1975)

No. 20, 22
- Position: Safety

Personal information
- Born: September 10, 1975 (age 51); Detroit, Michigan, U.S.
- Listed height: 6 ft 0 in (1.83 m)
- Listed weight: 212 lb (96 kg)

Career information
- High school: Solon (Solon, Ohio)
- College: Penn State
- NFL draft: 1997: 2nd round, 58th overall pick

Career history
- Baltimore Ravens (1997–2000); St. Louis Rams (2001–2003); Cincinnati Bengals (2004–2005)

Awards and highlights
- Super Bowl champion (XXXV); First-team All-American (1996); First-team All-Big Ten (1996)

Career NFL statistics
- Tackles: 408
- Interceptions: 8
- Sacks: 2
- Stats at Pro Football Reference

Kimani Masai Herring (born September 10, 1975) is an American former professional football player who was a safety in the National Football League (NFL).

== Early life ==
Herring attended Solon High School (Solon, Ohio) and was a letterman in football and track.

== Professional career ==
A second round draft pick in the 1997 NFL draft, the 6'0", 212 lb. Herring played in 54 games for the Baltimore Ravens, including a victory and an interception in Super Bowl XXXV. After racking up 178 tackles, 2 sacks and 3 interceptions in his four seasons with Baltimore, he signed as a free agent with the St. Louis Rams in 2001. There he made another Super Bowl appearance that season in a 20–17 loss to the New England Patriots in Super Bowl XXXVI.

Herring started his first 32 games for the Rams until an injury forced him to spend the 2003 season on injured reserve. After signing with the Cincinnati Bengals in 2004, injuries continued to plague Herring. He played in 12 games for Cincinnati in 2004, but was sidelined for the entire 2005 season with a shoulder injury, and was released by the Bengals on March 31, 2006, in a salary cap move.

== NFL career statistics ==
Legend
	Won the Super Bowl
**Bold**	Career high

=== Regular season ===
Year	Team	Games		Tackles				Interceptions				Fumbles			
Year	Team	GP	GS	Comb	Solo	Ast	Sck	Int	Yds	TD	Lng	FF	FR	Yds	TD
1997	BAL	15	4	52	44	8	**1.0**	0	0	0	0	1	1	0	0
1998	BAL	7	7	27	20	7	0.0	0	0	0	0	0	0	0	0
1999	BAL	16	16	67	55	12	0.0	0	0	0	0	0	**2**	0	0
2000	BAL	16	16	61	52	9	**1.0**	**3**	**74**	0	30	**2**	0	0	0
2001	STL	16	15	59	53	6	0.0	1	15	0	15	1	0	0	0
2002	STL	16	16	**78**	**68**	10	0.0	**3**	38	0	**36**	0	1	**3**	0
2004	CIN	12	10	64	51	**13**	0.0	1	0	0	0	1	0	0	0
		98	84	408	343	65	2.0	8	127	0	36	5	4	3	0

=== Playoffs ===
Year	Team	Games		Tackles				Interceptions				Fumbles			
Year	Team	GP	GS	Comb	Solo	Ast	Sck	Int	Yds	TD	Lng	FF	FR	Yds	TD
2000	BAL	2	2	2	2	0	0.0	**1**	2	0	2	0	0	0	0
2001	STL	3	3	**10**	**10**	0	0.0	**1**	**45**	0	**45**	**1**	0	0	0
		5	5	12	12	0	0.0	2	47	0	45	1	0	0	0
