= Tommy Polley =

American football player (born 1978)

No. 52, 50
- Position: Linebacker

Personal information
- Born: January 18, 1978 (age 48); Baltimore, Maryland, U.S.
- Listed height: 6 ft 3 in (1.91 m)
- Listed weight: 230 lb (104 kg)

Career information
- High school: Dunbar (Baltimore)
- College: Florida State
- NFL draft: 2001: 2nd round, 42nd overall pick

Career history
- St. Louis Rams (2001–2004); Baltimore Ravens (2005); New Orleans Saints (2006)

Awards and highlights
- BCS national champion (1999); 2× First-team All-ACC (1999, 2000)

Career NFL statistics
- Tackles: 392
- Pass deflections: 26
- Sacks: 6
- Forced fumbles: 4
- Interceptions: 4
- Stats at Pro Football Reference

Tommy William Polley (born January 18, 1978) is an American former professional football player who was a linebacker for six seasons in the National Football League (NFL). He originally played for the St. Louis Rams from 2001 to 2004 before signing with the Baltimore Ravens as a free agent in 2005. He played only one season with the Ravens before signing with the Saints on June 2, 2006. Polley grew up in Baltimore and played football for Dunbar High School. He was a Top 50 Basketball prospect according to Hoop Scoop.

== Early life ==
Polley was hailed as one of the top prep athletes in the nation during his senior year at Dunbar High School in Baltimore, which is regarded as one of the top producers of basketball talent in the country. He was USA Today’s Player-of-the-Year in Maryland after recording 208 tackles (136 solo), 16 sacks and eight interceptions as a senior. He also caught 34 passes for 567 yards and three TDs. He led his team to back-to-back state championships as a junior and senior and was named Baltimore area Defensive Player-of-the-Year after both his junior and senior campaigns. He was also regarded as one of the country's top 60 basketball prospects, and led the Poets to four straight state titles—averaged 20.4 points, 10.7 rebounds, and 8.1 assists per game as a senior.

== College career ==
Polley enrolled at Florida State University as a scholarship player. He ended his collegiate career with 289 tackles (170 solo) and was a semi-finalist for the Butkus Award, third-team Football News All-American, First-team All-ACC selection, and a finalist for the ACC's Brian Piccolo Award (as a result of his courageous comeback from the injury he suffered in the Sugar Bowl). In his final season at FSU, Polley had 100 tackles with 53 solo tackles, 7 tackles for a loss, 2 sacks, broke up 7 passes, recovered a team-high 3 fumbles, and forced one. The defensive leader and captain took the Seminoles to another National Championship (2001 Orange Bowl), even though his team ultimately lost 13–2 to the Oklahoma Sooners. In his junior year in 1999, Polley had an outstanding season when he led Florida State with 109 tackles (67 solos) and also had six stops for loss. He earned First-team All-ACC accolades. In his Sophomore Year (1998) he started 12 of 13 games at both outside linebacking posts and had 59 total tackles (37 solo) and had two tackles for loss. 1997 was his freshman Year (and he totaled 21 tackles with 13 solo stops in the first year of action and played in all 12 games and had at least one tackle in eight games. In 1996, he Redshirted along with most of his class.

== Professional career ==
Polley was selected by the St. Louis Rams in the second round of the 2001 NFL draft. He finished his rookie season with 67 tackles (50 solo). Polley went on to have a 6-year NFL career, amassing 304 tackles with 224 solo stops, and retired in 2007 after a shoulder injury sidelined him for most of the season. After 4 seasons with the Rams, he finished his career by spending one year with the Baltimore Ravens and his final year with the New Orleans Saints.

== NFL career statistics ==
Legend
**Bold**	Career high

=== Regular season ===
Year	Team	Games		Tackles					Interceptions					Fumbles			
Year	Team	GP	GS	Cmb	Solo	Ast	Sck	TFL	Int	Yds	TD	Lng	PD	FF	FR	Yds	TD
2001	STL	**16**	11	85	68	17	0.0	4	0	0	0	0	3	0	0	0	0
2002	STL	12	11	61	46	15	0.0	1	0	0	0	0	2	**2**	**1**	0	0
2003	STL	14	14	70	58	12	0.0	**6**	**4**	**32**	0	**22**	**12**	1	**1**	0	0
2004	STL	15	13	79	66	13	2.0	5	0	0	0	0	6	1	0	0	0
2005	BAL	**16**	**15**	**97**	**73**	**24**	**4.0**	5	0	0	0	0	3	0	**1**	**2**	0
		73	64	392	311	81	6.0	21	4	32	0	22	26	4	3	2	0

=== Playoffs ===
Year	Team	Games		Tackles					Interceptions					Fumbles			
Year	Team	GP	GS	Cmb	Solo	Ast	Sck	TFL	Int	Yds	TD	Lng	PD	FF	FR	Yds	TD
2001	STL	**3**	**3**	**30**	**22**	**8**	0.0	0	**2**	35	**1**	34	**4**	0	0	0	0
2003	STL	1	1	7	7	0	0.0	**1**	1	**37**	0	**37**	1	0	0	0	0
2004	STL	2	2	18	14	4	0.0	0	0	0	0	0	2	0	**1**	0	0
		6	6	55	43	12	0.0	1	3	72	1	37	7	0	1	0	0

== Coaching career ==
Polley coaches for Belleville West High School in Belleville, Illinois as the defensive coordinator.
