= Tyoka Jackson =

American football player (born 1971)

No. 97, 91
- Positions: Defensive tackle Defensive end

Personal information
- Born: November 22, 1971 (age 54); Washington, D.C., U.S.
- Listed height: 6 ft 2 in (1.88 m)
- Listed weight: 280 lb (127 kg)

Career information
- High school: Bishop McNamara (Forestville, Maryland)
- College: Penn State
- NFL draft: 1994: undrafted

Career history
- Atlanta Falcons (1994)*; Miami Dolphins (1994); Tampa Bay Buccaneers (1995–2000); St. Louis Rams (2001–2005); Detroit Lions (2006)
- * Offseason or practice squad member only

Career NFL statistics
- Tackles: 196
- Sacks: 29
- Forced fumbles: 6
- Fumble recoveries: 3
- Interceptions: 1
- Stats at Pro Football Reference

Tyoka Jackson (born November 22, 1971) is an American former professional football player who was a defensive tackle for 12 seasons in the National Football League (NFL). He played for the Miami Dolphins, Tampa Bay Buccaneers, St. Louis Rams, and Detroit Lions. He retired from football following the 2006 NFL season.

== Early life ==
Jackson attended Bishop McNamara High School in Forestville, Maryland, and was a student and a starting defensive tackle on the football team. As a senior football player, he garnered 12 quarterback sacks and more than 100 tackles, and earned All-Metro honors from The Washington Post.

== College career ==
Jackson was a standout on defense at Penn State. As a sophomore, he posted a team-leading 9.5 sacks, and 25 tackles. He earned Defensive Most Valuable Player honors at the 1992 Fiesta Bowl during his sophomore year. His junior season, he won second team All-East honors and garnered three sacks and 25 tackles. As a senior, he was a Football News All-American honorable mention pick, and named first team All-Big Ten. He posted a team-leading eight sacks, in addition to 41 tackles. As a senior, Jackson was a starter in the Senior Bowl All-Star Game. During his college career, he twice led his team in sacks, and graduated from Penn State as the school's second all-time leader in sacks. Jackson was chosen for Penn State's All-Decade team for the 1990s. In 1994, Jackson earned a Bachelor of Arts in Labor and Industrial Relations from Penn State University with a minor in Business Administration.

== Professional career ==
Although he went undrafted, Jackson played in the NFL for 12 years, the fifth-longest among former Penn State players in the NFL. He signed with the Atlanta Falcons as an undrafted free agent defensive end, and spent most of the 1994 NFL season on the practice squad. He was active to play at defensive end with the Miami Dolphins, under Hall of Fame coach Don Shula during the playoffs in 1994–95. Jackson joined the Tampa Bay Buccaneers in late 1996, and played five seasons with the team for Hall of Famer Tony Dungy. Jackson signed with the St. Louis Rams and head coach Mike Martz's “Greatest Show on Turf” in May 2001. He played in Super Bowl XXXVI for the Rams, a loss to the New England Patriots. Chosen as the team's defensive captain from 2003 to 2005, Jackson was named Captain in Perpetuity in 2005. In 2004, Jackson won the local media's annual “Go To Guy” award, given to the best interview in the Rams’ locker room. In 2005, Jackson was named to the St. Louis Rams’ 10th Anniversary Team in a vote by the fans. He was also selected as one of the St. Louis Rams’ top-10 all-time free agent signings. Jackson finished his career as a member of the Detroit Lions, playing both as a reserve defensive end and tackle and on special teams in 2006–07.

== NFL career statistics ==
Legend
**Bold**	Career high

Year	Team	Games		Tackles				Interceptions				Fumbles			
Year	Team	GP	GS	Comb	Solo	Ast	Sck	Int	Yds	TD	Lng	FF	FR	Yds	TD
1994	MIA	1	0	0	0	0	0.0	0	0	0	0	1	**1**	0	0
1996	TB	13	2	11	9	2	0.0	0	0	0	0	0	0	0	0
1997	TB	12	0	7	5	2	2.5	0	0	0	0	1	0	0	0
1998	TB	16	12	27	21	6	3.0	0	0	0	0	1	0	0	0
1999	TB	6	0	7	5	2	1.0	0	0	0	0	0	0	0	0
2000	TB	16	1	11	8	3	2.0	0	0	0	0	0	0	0	0
2001	STL	16	0	20	13	**7**	3.0	0	0	0	0	1	**1**	0	0
2002	STL	16	0	17	14	3	3.5	0	0	0	0	0	0	0	0
2003	STL	16	3	29	23	6	**5.5**	**1**	**11**	0	**11**	**2**	**1**	0	0
2004	STL	14	0	**33**	**30**	3	4.0	0	0	0	0	0	0	0	0
2005	STL	16	2	22	18	4	2.5	0	0	0	0	0	0	0	0
2006	DET	15	0	12	8	4	2.0	0	0	0	0	0	0	0	0
Career		157	20	196	154	42	29.0	1	11	0	11	6	3	0	0

== Personal life ==
As he was beginning his NFL career, Jackson was also beginning his career as an entrepreneur, founding The Jackson Investment Company, LLC in 1995, and serving as its president. The company specializes in the purchase and development of residential real estate for urban renewal projects.

The company also was responsible for bringing the first IHOP franchise to Washington, D.C. It was the first sit-down franchise in the history of the city's 8th Ward. He has since opened a second location in The Columbia Heights neighborhood of D.C.

He has served on the board of directors of the Blue Roof Franchisee Association, a member association representing IHOP franchisees, since 2012.

Jackson founded “Tyoka’s Troops” in 1999. For 10 years, Tyoka's Troops conducted a variety of service projects including blood drives in Tampa and St. Louis, and partnered with Florida Blood Services and the American Red Cross to raise awareness about the importance of regular blood and bone marrow donation.

In 2008–09, Tyoka's Troops also created an incentive program at Malcolm X Elementary School in Jackson's hometown of Washington, D.C.

Since 2009, Jackson has been a board member of the YMCA of the Capitol Area (Capitol View Chapter). Additionally, Tyoka Jackson Field is the renamed home football field at his high school alma mater, Bishop McNamara High School.
