= Ryan Pickett =

American football player (born 1979)

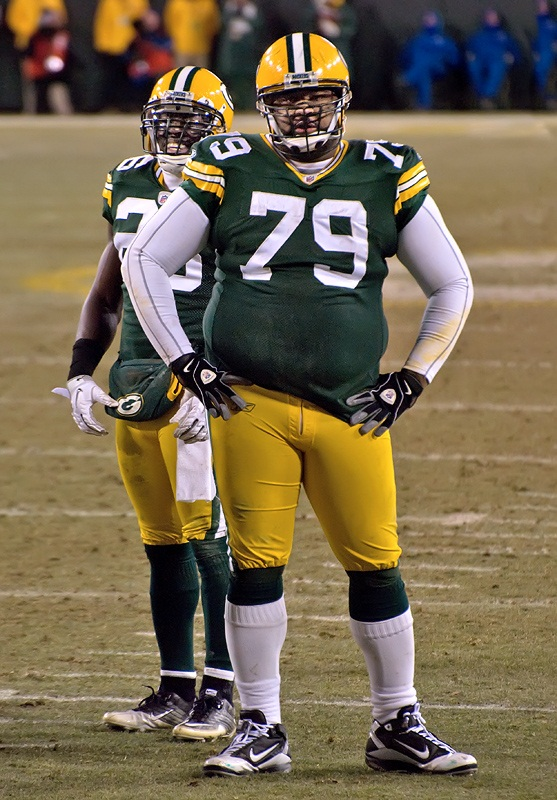
- Pickett with the Green Bay Packers in 2011

No. 79, 94
- Position: Nose tackle

Personal information
- Born: October 8, 1979 (age 47); Zephyrhills, Florida, U.S.
- Listed height: 6 ft 2 in (1.88 m)
- Listed weight: 340 lb (154 kg)

Career information
- High school: Zephyrhills
- College: Ohio State (1998–2000)
- NFL draft: 2001: 1st round, 29th overall pick

Career history
- St. Louis Rams (2001–2005); Green Bay Packers (2006–2013); Houston Texans (2014)

Awards and highlights
- Super Bowl champion (XLV); St. Louis Rams 10th Anniversary Team

Career NFL statistics
- Total tackles: 583
- Sacks: 9.5
- Forced fumbles: 1
- Fumble recoveries: 2
- Pass deflections: 33
- Stats at Pro Football Reference

Ryan Lamonte Pickett Sr. (born October 8, 1979) is an American former professional football player who was a nose tackle for 14 seasons in the National Football League (NFL). He played college football for the Ohio State Buckeyes. Pickett was selected with the 29th pick of the first round in the 2001 NFL draft by the St. Louis Rams. He also played for the Green Bay Packers and Houston Texans. With the Packers, he beat the Pittsburgh Steelers in Super Bowl XLV.

== Early life ==
Pickett was a consensus All-American selection, named one of the top 25 players in the country by the National Recruiting Advisor and earned All-State honors at Zephyrhills High. He recorded 119 tackles with seven sacks as a senior.

Pickett was also a force for the Zephyrhills basketball team, averaging 10 points and 10 rebounds per game. He also was the school's first baseman on the baseball team until his senior season.

== College career ==
Pickett played college football at Ohio State University from 1998 to 2000. He was a three-year starter and played both defensive tackle positions. Pickett played in every game as a true freshman and started the final nine games at right defensive tackle. He totaled 22 stops (17 solo), two sacks, and five tackles for loss. As a sophomore, Ryan started the whole season at right defensive tackle. He also was named All-Big Ten honorable mention with career-highs of 48 tackles (34 solo) and three sacks. In Pickett's junior season, he switched sides and played left defensive tackle. He totaled 39 tackles (21 solo), three sacks and two forced fumbles in 1999. After Pickett's junior season he chose to forgo his senior season and enter the NFL draft.

== Professional career ==
Pre-draft measurables
| Height | Weight | 40-yard dash | 20-yard shuttle | Vertical jump |
|---|---|---|---|---|
| 6 ft 2 1/8 in (1.88 m) | 309 lb (140 kg) | 4.98 s | 4.48 s | 30 in (0.76 m) |
All values from Ohio State Pro Day, except for height and weight, which were measured at the NFL Combine

=== St. Louis Rams ===
Pickett was selected with the 29th pick of the first round in the 2001 NFL draft by the St. Louis Rams. On July 28, 2001, Pickett signed a five-year, $5.995 million contract with the Rams. Pickett's contract includes a $2.615 million signing bonuses. His base salaries were $504,000 in 2001, $530,000 in 2002, $656,000 in 2003, $782,000 in 2004 and $908,000 in 2005.

In his rookie season with the Rams, Pickett took a backup role on the defensive front along with playing some special teams. He played 11 games during his rookie year with 19 tackles and half a sack. He helped the Rams into Super Bowl XXXVI, eventually to lose to the New England Patriots 17–20. In 2002, Pickett had a breakout year starting 14 games at left defensive tackle and finishing the season second on the team in tackles with 67 (45 solo). In 2003 and 2004 he maintained his above average play at the defensive tackle and nose tackle positions for the St. Louis Rams and was a vital part of their defense both in the regular season and in playoff contests. In 2005, Pickett had his highest statistical season to date. He started all 16 of the Rams games and racked up a career high 65 tackles (47 solo), which was the highest total for any defensive lineman in the NFL that season. After the 2005 season Pickett became a highly touted unrestricted free agent.

=== Green Bay Packers ===
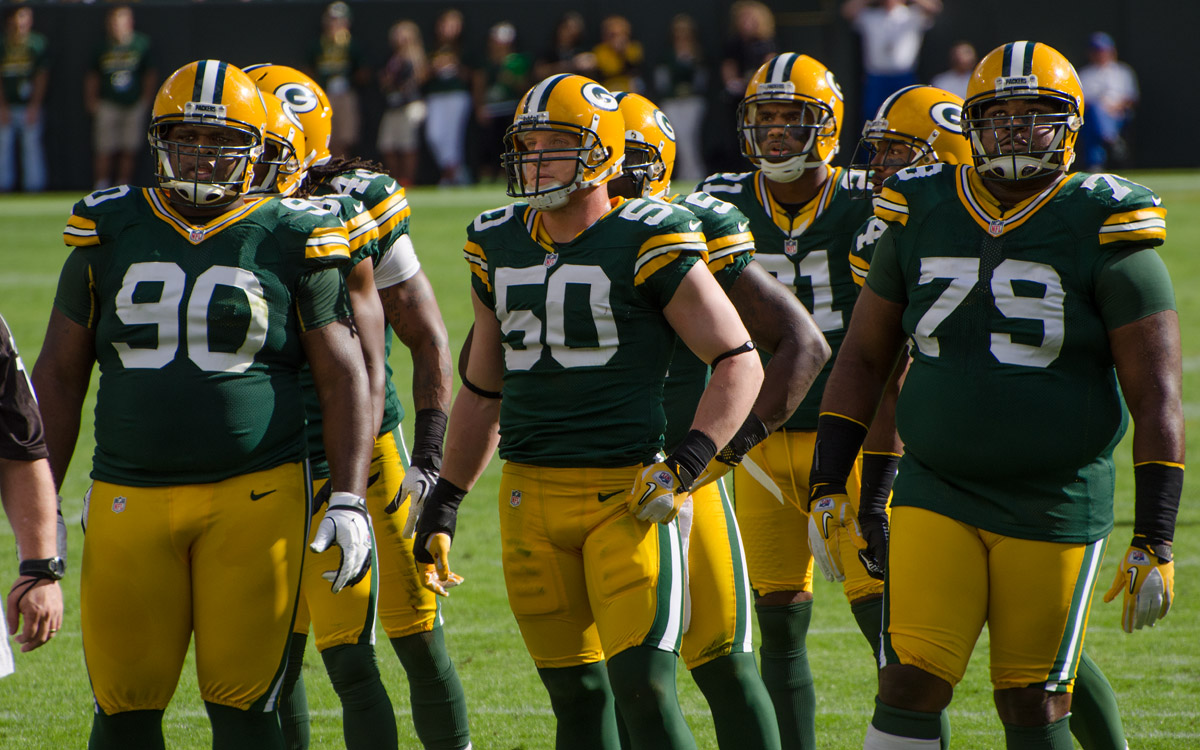
Ryan Pickett (right) with B. J. Raji and A. J. Hawk.

On March 17, 2006, the Green Bay Packers signed Pickett to a four-year, $14-million free-agent contract. In his first season with the Packers, Pickett started in all 16 of the Packers regular season games and collected 92 tackles (45 solo), one fumble recovery, and a career-best seven passes defensed. In 2007 Pickett played in 14 games (14 starts) and totaled 39 tackles and recorded his first sack as a Packer. In 2008, he had 48 tackles, started all 16 games, and registered 1.5 sacks and knocked away three passes. In 2009, Pickett accepted the new role to the sole nose tackle position with Dom Capers using the new 3–4 defense style. Pickett started 13 games with 33 tackles and 2 passes defended.

On February 25, 2010, the Packers applied their Franchise Tag on Pickett, but eventually signed him to a 4-year, $28 million deal on March 12, 2010. With B. J. Raji gaining playing time, Pickett transition to defensive end as the Packers mostly used a 3–4 type defense but sometimes played defensive tackle during 4–3 scheme usages. During the 2010 year, Pickett played 14 games with 32 tackles, 1 sack, 1 pass defended, and 1 fumble recovery.

Pickett trailed only Charles Woodson as the longest-tenured NFL player on the Packers' defense. He started and had two tackles in Super Bowl XLV but, more importantly, was instrumental in one of the game's biggest plays. On the first play of the fourth quarter, the Pittsburgh Steelers were trailing the Packers 21–17, but had a second-and-two at the Packers' 33-yard-line. Steelers running back Rashard Mendenhall took a handoff and was immediately met in the backfield by Pickett. Pickett had Mendelhall wrapped up, allowing Clay Matthews to force a fumble by sandwiching Mendenhall between himself and Pickett. Packers' linebacker Desmond Bishop recovered the fumble and the Packers offense would march down the field to extend their lead to 28–17. The Packers would go on to a 31–25 victory, bringing Green Bay their first championship title in fourteen years.

In the 2011 season, Pickett continued his role at defensive end while B. J. Raji took over as the sole nose tackle. Pickett finished the year starting 14 games with 33 tackles and 2 passes defended. The Packers finished the season with a 15–1 record for an NFC North pennant, but lost to the New York Giants by a score of 20–37 in the divisional round.

In the 2012 season, Pickett started all 16 games with 51 tackles and 1 pass defended. The Packers clinched another NFC North pennant with an 11–5 record, but lost in the divisional round to the San Francisco 49ers by a score of 31–45.

In the 2013 season, the defensive line was marred by various injuries, as Pickett regained his role as the sole nose tackle while B. J. Raji played defensive end. Pickett played all 16 games at nose tackle with 19 tackles and 2 passes defended. The Packers clinched yet another NFC North pennant with an 8–7–1 record, but again lost to the 49ers 20–23 in the Wild Card round.

=== Houston Texans ===
In response of Louis Nix III going on injured reserve due to knee injuries, Pickett was signed by the Houston Texans on September 24, 2014. Pickett made 13 starts with 20 tackles and 3 passes defended.

== NFL career statistics ==
Legend
| **Bold** | Career high |

=== Regular season ===
| Year | Team | Games | | Tackles | | | | | Interceptions | | | | | Fumbles | | | |
| Year | Team | GP | GS | Cmb | Solo | Ast | Sck | TFL | Int | Yds | TD | Lng | PD | FF | FR | Yds | TD |
|---|---|---|---|---|---|---|---|---|---|---|---|---|---|---|---|---|---|
| 2001 | STL | 11 | 0 | 24 | 13 | 11 | 0.5 | 3 | 0 | 0 | 0 | 0 | 0 | 0 | 0 | 0 | 0 |
| 2002 | STL | **16** | 14 | **67** | 45 | 22 | 0.5 | 8 | 0 | 0 | 0 | 0 | 4 | 0 | 0 | 0 | 0 |
| 2003 | STL | **16** | 13 | 42 | 30 | 12 | 1.0 | 4 | 0 | 0 | 0 | 0 | 3 | 0 | 0 | 0 | 0 |
| 2004 | STL | **16** | **16** | 46 | 42 | 4 | **2.0** | 5 | 0 | 0 | 0 | 0 | 2 | **1** | 0 | 0 | 0 |
| 2005 | STL | **16** | **16** | 65 | **47** | 18 | **2.0** | **14** | 0 | 0 | 0 | 0 | 3 | 0 | 0 | 0 | 0 |
| 2006 | GNB | **16** | **16** | 64 | 31 | **33** | 0.0 | 1 | 0 | 0 | 0 | 0 | **5** | 0 | **1** | 0 | 0 |
| 2007 | GNB | 14 | 14 | 39 | 28 | 11 | 1.0 | 3 | 0 | 0 | 0 | 0 | 2 | 0 | 0 | 0 | 0 |
| 2008 | GNB | **16** | **16** | 48 | 26 | 22 | 1.5 | 3 | 0 | 0 | 0 | 0 | 3 | 0 | 0 | 0 | 0 |
| 2009 | GNB | 13 | 9 | 33 | 22 | 11 | 0.0 | 3 | 0 | 0 | 0 | 0 | 2 | 0 | 0 | 0 | 0 |
| 2010 | GNB | 14 | 12 | 32 | 24 | 8 | 1.0 | 3 | 0 | 0 | 0 | 0 | 1 | 0 | **1** | 0 | 0 |
| 2011 | GNB | 14 | 14 | 33 | 25 | 8 | 0.0 | 2 | 0 | 0 | 0 | 0 | 2 | 0 | 0 | 0 | 0 |
| 2012 | GNB | **16** | **16** | 51 | 27 | 24 | 0.0 | 2 | 0 | 0 | 0 | 0 | 1 | 0 | 0 | 0 | 0 |
| 2013 | GNB | **16** | **16** | 19 | 15 | 4 | 0.0 | 1 | 0 | 0 | 0 | 0 | 2 | 0 | 0 | 0 | 0 |
| 2014 | HOU | 13 | 13 | 20 | 11 | 9 | 0.0 | 0 | 0 | 0 | 0 | 0 | 3 | 0 | 0 | 0 | 0 |
| | | 207 | 185 | 583 | 386 | 197 | 9.5 | 52 | 0 | 0 | 0 | 0 | 33 | 1 | 2 | 0 | 0 |

=== Playoffs ===
| Year | Team | Games | | Tackles | | | | | Interceptions | | | | | Fumbles | | | |
| Year | Team | GP | GS | Cmb | Solo | Ast | Sck | TFL | Int | Yds | TD | Lng | PD | FF | FR | Yds | TD |
|---|---|---|---|---|---|---|---|---|---|---|---|---|---|---|---|---|---|
| 2001 | STL | 3 | 0 | 3 | 1 | 2 | 0.0 | 1 | 0 | 0 | 0 | 0 | 0 | 0 | 0 | 0 | 0 |
| 2003 | STL | 1 | 1 | 4 | 3 | 1 | 0.0 | 1 | 0 | 0 | 0 | 0 | **1** | 0 | 0 | 0 | 0 |
| 2004 | STL | 2 | 2 | **12** | 8 | **4** | 0.0 | **2** | 0 | 0 | 0 | 0 | **1** | 0 | 0 | 0 | 0 |
| 2007 | GNB | 2 | 2 | 7 | 6 | 1 | 0.0 | 1 | 0 | 0 | 0 | 0 | 0 | 0 | 0 | 0 | 0 |
| 2009 | GNB | 1 | 0 | 2 | 2 | 0 | 0.0 | 0 | 0 | 0 | 0 | 0 | 0 | 0 | 0 | 0 | 0 |
| 2010 | GNB | **4** | **4** | 9 | **9** | 0 | 0.0 | 0 | 0 | 0 | 0 | 0 | 0 | 0 | 0 | 0 | 0 |
| 2011 | GNB | 1 | 0 | 4 | 3 | 1 | 0.0 | 1 | 0 | 0 | 0 | 0 | 0 | 0 | 0 | 0 | 0 |
| 2012 | GNB | 2 | 2 | 6 | 4 | 2 | 0.0 | 0 | 0 | 0 | 0 | 0 | 0 | 0 | 0 | 0 | 0 |
| 2013 | GNB | 1 | 1 | 5 | 4 | 1 | 0.0 | 0 | 0 | 0 | 0 | 0 | 0 | 0 | 0 | 0 | 0 |
| | | 17 | 12 | 52 | 40 | 12 | 0.0 | 6 | 0 | 0 | 0 | 0 | 2 | 0 | 0 | 0 | 0 |

== Personal life ==
Pickett is a Christian.

In 2012, he formed The Ryan Pickett Foundation, which addresses issues in foster care by providing emotional and monetary relief to children who were placed within the foster care system. Proceeds are split equally between The American Foundation of Counseling Services of Green Bay and Casa de Amparo in San Diego.

Through his foundation, Pickett hosted his first Celebrity Golf Classic in 2013 at the Barona Creek Golf Course in Lakeside, California, just outside San Diego. His celebrity guests included Aaron Rodgers, Clay Matthews, Marshall Faulk and Sterling Sharpe among others.
