= Damione Lewis =

American football player and coach (born 1978)

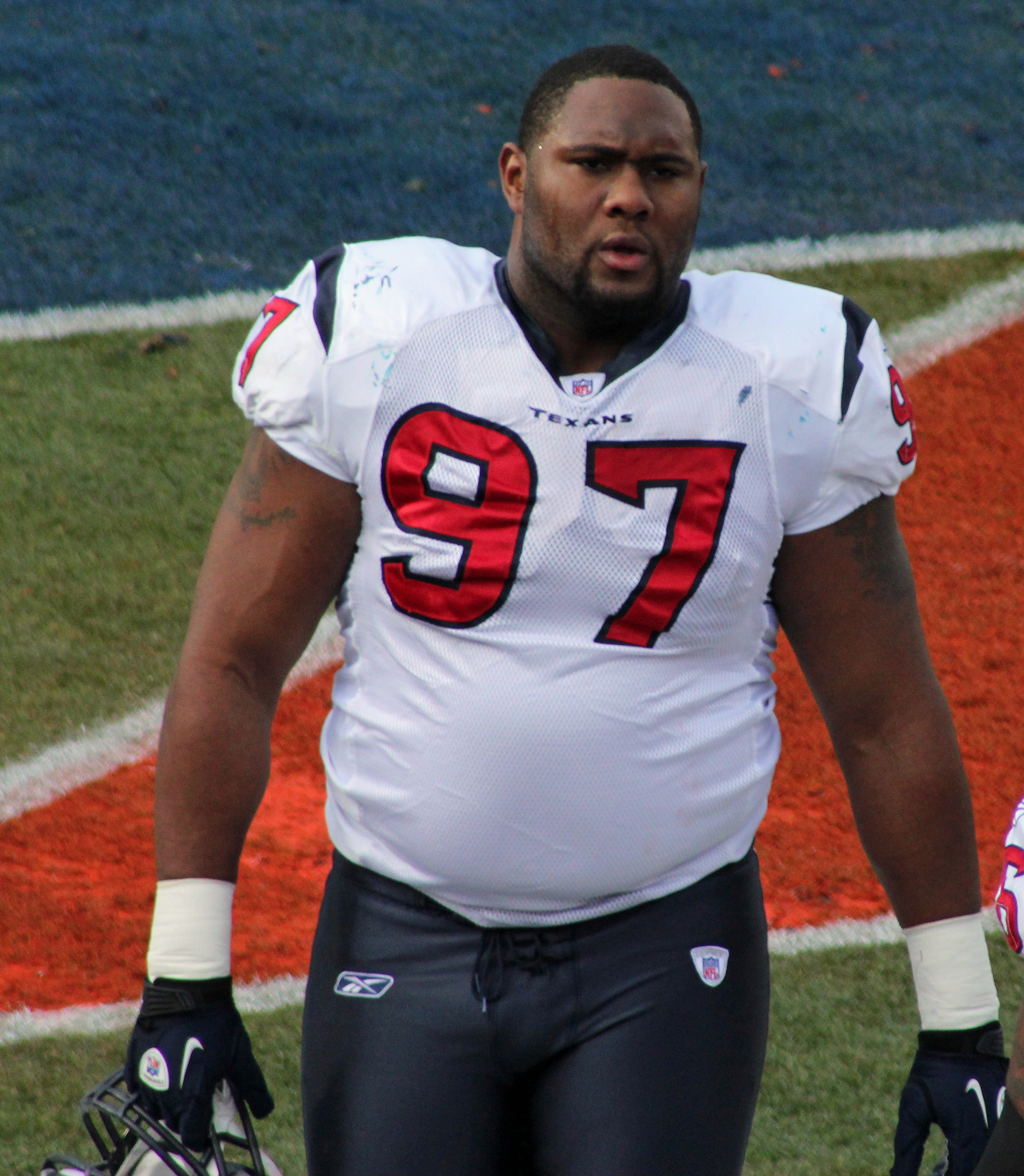
- Lewis with the Houston Texans in 2010

Miami Hurricanes
- Title: Defensive line coach

Personal information
- Born: March 1, 1978 (age 48); Sulphur Springs, Texas, U.S.
- Listed height: 6 ft 2 in (1.88 m)
- Listed weight: 301 lb (137 kg)

Career information
- High school: Sulphur Springs
- College: Miami (FL) (1996–2000)
- NFL draft: 2001: 1st round, 12th overall pick

Career history

Playing
- St. Louis Rams (2001–2005); Carolina Panthers (2006–2009); New England Patriots (2010)*; Houston Texans (2010)
- * Offseason or practice squad member only

Coaching
- Seattle Seahawks (2020–2023); Defensive line coach (2020–2021); Defensive tackles coach & assistant defensive line coach (2022–2023); Colorado (2024) Defensive line coach; Miami (FL) (2025–present) Defensive line coach

Operations
- FIU (2019) Assistant athletic director of football player development

Awards and highlights
- First-team All-Big East (2000); Second-team All-Big East (1999)

Career NFL statistics
- Total tackles: 277
- Sacks: 23.5
- Forced fumbles: 4
- Fumble recoveries: 5
- Pass deflections: 16
- Stats at Pro Football Reference

Damione Ramon Lewis (born March 1, 1978) is an American football coach and former player who is currently the defensive line coach for Miami (FL). He played professionally as a defensive end in the National Football League (NFL). Lewis played college football for the Miami Hurricanes before being selected by the St. Louis Rams in the first round of the 2001 NFL draft. He also played in the NFL for the Carolina Panthers, New England Patriots, and Houston Texans. After his playing career, he became a defensive assistant for the Seattle Seahawks.

== Early life ==
Lewis attended Sulphur Springs High School in Sulphur Springs, Texas.

== College career ==
Lewis played college football at the University of Miami. After redshirting as a true freshman, Lewis started in his second year and produced a career-high 72 tackles, four sacks, and one forced fumble. As a sophomore in 1998 he led all Hurricanes defensive linemen with 52 tackles and registered two sacks. In 1999, as a junior Lewis posted 57 tackles, 6.5 sacks, two forced fumbles and one fumble recovery and was named to the second-team All-Big East. As a senior, he recorded 39 tackles, three sacks, and two forced fumbles. He was named first-team All-Big East and Third-team All-American by the Sporting News.

Lewis started 41 of 43 games at Miami and finished his career with 220 career tackles, 15.5 sacks, and five forced fumbles.

== Professional career ==
=== Pre-draft measurables ===
Pre-draft measurables
Height	Weight	40-yard dash	Vertical jump	Bench press
6 ft 2 3/4 in (1.90 m)	293 lb (133 kg)	4.91 s	30 in (0.76 m)	35 reps
Height/weight and bench press from NFL Combine, 40-yard dash from Miami Pro Day

=== St. Louis Rams ===
Lewis was selected by the St. Louis Rams with the 12th overall pick in the 2001 NFL draft. On July 27, 2001, Lewis agreed to a five-year, $7.5 million contract with the Rams. As a rookie in 2001, Lewis played in nine games with three starts prior to being placed on injured reserve with a broken right foot, keeping him out of the Rams' Super Bowl XXXVI loss to the New England Patriots. The following year, he played in 16 games with two starts (one at defensive end and one a defensive tackle). He posted 44 tackles, four sacks, 14 quarterback pressures and one pass defensed.

In 2003, Lewis played in 12 games (starting the first seven of the season). He registered 34 tackles, half a sack, 13 quarterback pressures, one forced fumble and one pass defensed. A sprained ankle against the Pittsburgh Steelers hampered his playing time in the second half of the season.

In 2004, Lewis again earned the starting job at the outset of the season, starting the first 10 contests and playing in all 16. He amassed career highs of 61 tackles and five sacks in addition to recording eight quarterback pressures, one forced fumble and two passes defensed. The next season, he played in 16 games with seven starts. However, in 2005, he was in the starting lineup for the final seven contests. He produced 45 tackles, one sack, 23 quarterback pressures, one forced fumble and one fumble recovery.

Lewis played for the Rams for five years, starting 29 of 69 games, and recording 10.5 sacks.

=== Carolina Panthers ===
On March 14, 2006, the Carolina Panthers signed him to a two-year deal worth about $3.5 million.

In 2006, Lewis played in 16 games with three starts in his first season in Carolina. He posted 30 tackles, 4.5 sacks, 11 quarterback pressures, one forced fumble and three pass deflections. Lewis contributed to defense that finished seventh in the NFL in total defense and tied for eighth in scoring defense, allowing 19.1 points per game. He also helped unit rank 11th in the league in rushing yards per game, third in third-down efficiency and seventh in sacks per pass play. The 41 sacks by defense was the fourth-highest total in team history. In 2007, Lewis played 15 games with two starts, which brought his career totals to 100 career games and 34 career starts. For the season Lewis recorded 32 tackles, 3.5 sacks, a pass deflected and a fumble recovery.

After the 2007 season the Panthers re-signed Lewis to a new three-year $14 million extension.

In 2008, Lewis became a full-time starter after Kris Jenkins was traded. Lewis started 15 games on the year missing one start due to injury. He had 43 tackles, 3.5 sacks, and 1 forced fumble during the year.

He was released on March 4, 2010.

=== New England Patriots ===
Lewis signed with the New England Patriots on April 2, 2010, and was released during final cuts on September 3, 2010.

=== Houston Texans ===
Lewis signed with the Houston Texans on October 25, 2010. He was released on September 2, 2011.

=== NFL statistics ===
Year	Team	Games	Combined tackles	Tackles	Assisted tackles	Sacks	Forced fumbles	Fumble recoveries
2001	STL	9	10	9	1	0.0	0	1
2002	STL	16	20	14	6	4.0	0	0
2003	STL	12	15	11	4	0.5	1	0
2004	STL	16	36	26	10	5.0	1	0
2005	STL	16	34	27	7	1.0	0	1
2006	CAR	16	17	13	4	4.5	1	0
2007	CAR	15	29	16	13	3.5	0	1
2008	CAR	15	43	33	10	3.5	1	1
2009	CAR	16	41	29	12	0.5	0	1
2010	HOU	10	17	13	4	1.0	0	0
Career		141	262	191	71	23.5	4	5

== Coaching career ==
After spending 2019 at FIU as the Panthers’ Assistant Athletic Director of Football/Player Development. In 2020 Lewis became a coach under Pete Carroll for the Seattle Seahawks. In March 2023, Lewis was hired as a defensive analyst for the Colorado Buffaloes. In 2024, Lewis was promoted to be the defensive line coach of the Buffaloes.
