= Mark Fields (linebacker) =

American football player (born 1972)

No. 55, 58
- Position: Linebacker

Personal information
- Born: November 9, 1972 (age 53); Los Angeles California, U.S.
- Listed height: 6 ft 2 in (1.88 m)
- Listed weight: 244 lb (111 kg)

Career information
- High school: Washington Preparatory (Los Angeles)
- College: Washington State
- NFL draft: 1995: 1st round, 13th overall pick

Career history
- New Orleans Saints (1995–2000); St. Louis Rams (2001); Carolina Panthers (2002–2004)

Awards and highlights
- 2× Pro Bowl (2000, 2004); PFWA All-Rookie Team (1995); George Halas Award (2005); Third-team All-American (1994); Pac-10 Defensive Player of the Year (1994); First-team All-Pac-10 (1994)

Career NFL statistics
- Tackles: 769
- Sacks: 34.5
- Interceptions: 5
- Stats at Pro Football Reference

Mark Lee Fields (born November 9, 1972) is an American former professional football player who was a linebacker in the National Football League (NFL). He had a ten-year career with the New Orleans Saints, St. Louis Rams, and the Carolina Panthers before missing the 2005 NFL season due to being diagnosed with Hodgkin lymphoma for the second time in three seasons and subsequently retiring.

== Early life ==
Born and raised in Inglewood, California, Fields started his football career as a youth playing in the Junior All American Football League alongside another NFL notable teammate Curtis Conway. Coached by Thaddeus "Coach" Belloue Mark Fields was an exceptional player and an inspiration to his team. Mark attended Washington Preparatory High School, Southwest College, and Compton College. He transferred to Washington State University in Pullman, and played middle linebacker under head coach Mike Price. As a senior in 1994, he was All-Pac-10, and its Defensive Player of the Year.

== NFL ==
Fields was the thirteenth overall selection in the first round of the 1995 NFL draft, taken by the New Orleans Saints. He played six years in New Orleans, leading or coming close to the team lead in tackles. He later played one year with the St. Louis Rams, appearing in Super Bowl XXXVI (losing to the New England Patriots) then signed with the Carolina Panthers in 2002.

However, before the start of the 2003 season, he learned he had Hodgkin's disease, and he was forced to sit the season out. Both he and linebackers coach Sam Mills were sources of inspiration for the team, which made it to Super Bowl XXXVIII, but Fields again lost to the New England Patriots. Fields returned to play in 2004

Fields learned before the start of the 2005 season that his Hodgkin's had returned, and so he turned down a new contract offer from Carolina.

== NFL career statistics ==
Legend
**Bold**	Career high

=== Regular season ===
Year	Team	Games		Tackles					Interceptions					Fumbles			
Year	Team	GP	GS	Cmb	Solo	Ast	Sck	TFL	Int	Yds	TD	Lng	PD	FF	FR	Yds	TD
1995	NOR	**16**	3	40	31	9	1.0	-	-	-	0	-	-	0	0	0	0
1996	NOR	**16**	**15**	107	85	22	2.0	-	-	-	0	-	-	1	1	20	0
1997	NOR	**16**	**15**	108	**88**	20	**8.0**	-	-	-	0	-	-	**4**	**2**	28	**1**
1998	NOR	15	**15**	**109**	82	**27**	6.0	-	-	-	0	-	-	1	1	**36**	**1**
1999	NOR	14	14	80	63	17	4.0	7	**2**	0	0	0	5	2	1	0	0
2000	NOR	**16**	14	83	63	20	2.0	3	0	0	0	0	1	0	0	0	0
2001	STL	14	12	63	48	15	0.0	4	1	30	0	**30**	6	0	0	0	0
2002	CAR	15	**15**	103	76	**27**	7.5	**14**	1	**37**	0	**30**	**7**	0	**2**	0	0
2004	CAR	14	10	62	50	12	4.0	10	1	14	0	14	3	1	1	0	0
		136	113	755	586	169	34.5	38	5	81	0	30	22	9	8	84	2

=== Playoffs ===
Year	Team	Games		Tackles					Interceptions					Fumbles			
Year	Team	GP	GS	Cmb	Solo	Ast	Sck	TFL	Int	Yds	TD	Lng	PD	FF	FR	Yds	TD
2000	NOR	2	**1**	**7**	**5**	**2**	0.0	**1**	-	-	0	-	-	0	0	0	0
2001	STL	**3**	0	2	2	0	0.0	0	-	-	0	-	-	0	0	0	0
		5	1	9	7	2	0.0	1	-	-	-	-	0	0	0	0	0

== Personal life ==
On August 10, 2010, Fields was arrested for assaulting the mother of his then-six-year-old daughter while she was picking her daughter up from daycare. Mark would be charged for aggravated assault, endangerment, disorderly conduct, and interfering with an educational institution as a result.

His son, Mark Fields II played cornerback in the NFL.
