= Jerametrius Butler =

American football player (born 1978)

No. 23, 38
- Position: Cornerback

Personal information
- Born: November 28, 1978 (age 47); Cleveland, Mississippi, U.S.
- Listed height: 5 ft 10 in (1.78 m)
- Listed weight: 181 lb (82 kg)

Career information
- High school: Dallas Carter (Dallas, Texas)
- College: Kansas State
- NFL draft: 2001: 5th round, 145th overall pick

Career history
- St. Louis Rams (2001–2006); Washington Redskins (2007)*; Buffalo Bills (2007); New Orleans Saints (2008)*
- * Offseason or practice squad member only

Awards and highlights
- First-team All-Big 12 (2000)

Career NFL statistics
- Total tackles: 206
- Forced fumbles: 1
- Fumble recoveries: 4
- Pass deflections: 34
- Interceptions: 9
- Stats at Pro Football Reference

Jerametrius Tarell Butler (born November 28, 1978) is an American former professional football player who was a cornerback in the National Football League (NFL). He was selected by the St. Louis Rams in the fifth round of the 2001 NFL draft. He played college football for the Kansas State Wildcats.

Butler was also a member of the Washington Redskins, Buffalo Bills and New Orleans Saints. He retired prior to the 2008 season.

== College career ==
After a high school career at Carter High School in Dallas, Texas, Butler committed to play cornerback at Kansas State. He played from 1998 to 2000, which included 10 interceptions, 6 of which came in 2000, leading him to earn first-team All-Big 12 honors.

== Professional career ==
=== Pre-draft ===
Pre-draft measurables
Height	Weight	40-yard dash	10-yard split	20-yard split	20-yard shuttle	Three-cone drill	Vertical jump	Broad jump	Bench press
5 ft 10 in (1.78 m)	181 lb (82 kg)	4.43 s	1.43 s	2.43 s	4.35 s	7.18 s	38 in (0.97 m)	10 ft 6 in (3.20 m)	17 reps
All from NFL Combine.

=== St. Louis Rams ===
Butler was selected in the fifth round with the 145th overall pick. On June 26, 2001, Butler signed a three-year $1.01 million contract with the Rams. Butler played his first six professional seasons with the St. Louis Rams. Jerametrius Butler earned the starting left cornerback job for 2003 season. Leading the Rams in interception and pass break ups. He also finished sixth on the team in tackles. On March 6, 2004, Butler, a now a restricted free agent, signed a six-year, $15 million offer sheet with Washington. On March 11, 2004, the Rams opted to match the Washington offer. In 2004, he had five interceptions leading the team again while giving up only one touchdown. Butler finished the season ranked fourth on the team in tackles. With 82. He suffered a season-ending knee injury (PCL) in training camp in 2005, causing him to miss the entire 2005 season. He was released by the Rams on June 5, 2007.

=== Washington Redskins ===
Butler signed with the Washington Redskins on June 7, 2007, but was released on August 28.

=== Buffalo Bills ===
Butler was signed by the Buffalo Bills as an unrestricted free agent on September 25, 2007. It was a two-year one million dollar contract. After being sidelined with a leg injury for the last four games On February 27, 2008, the Bills released him.

=== New Orleans Saints ===
Butler signed with the Saints on June 2, 2008. However, on July 23, he opted to retire. The Saints terminated his contract on February 12, 2009.

== NFL career statistics ==
Legend
**Bold**	Career high

=== Regular season ===
Year	Team	Games		Tackles					Interceptions					Fumbles			
Year	Team	GP	GS	Cmb	Solo	Ast	Sck	TFL	Int	Yds	TD	Lng	PD	FF	FR	Yds	TD
2001	STL	**16**	0	27	24	3	0.0	1	0	0	0	0	3	0	0	0	0
2002	STL	9	0	4	3	1	0.0	0	0	0	0	0	0	0	0	0	0
2003	STL	**16**	15	72	65	**7**	0.0	1	4	**72**	0	**45**	10	**1**	**2**	0	0
2004	STL	**16**	**16**	**79**	**73**	6	0.0	0	**5**	15	0	10	**19**	0	1	**2**	0
2006	STL	7	0	5	5	0	0.0	**2**	0	0	0	0	0	0	1	0	0
2007	BUF	7	1	19	16	3	0.0	1	0	0	0	0	2	0	0	0	0
		71	32	206	186	20	0.0	5	9	87	0	45	34	1	4	2	0

=== Playoffs ===
Year	Team	Games		Tackles					Interceptions					Fumbles			
Year	Team	GP	GS	Cmb	Solo	Ast	Sck	TFL	Int	Yds	TD	Lng	PD	FF	FR	Yds	TD
2001	STL	**3**	0	1	1	0	0.0	0	0	0	0	0	0	0	0	0	0
2003	STL	1	1	7	7	0	0.0	0	0	0	0	0	0	0	0	0	0
2004	STL	2	**2**	**13**	**13**	0	0.0	0	0	0	0	0	**1**	0	0	0	0
		6	3	21	21	0	0.0	0	0	0	0	0	1	0	0	0	0

== Personal life ==
Butler's son, Jerametrius Butler Jr., is a freshman on the Tarleton State Texans football team in Stephenville, Texas.
