= Brian Howard (rugby union) =

American rugby union player (born 1981)

- Born: September 9, 1981 (age 45) Seattle, Washington, U.S.
- Height: 1.90 m (6 ft 3 in)
- Weight: 130 kg (287 lb)

Rugby union career
- Position: Prop
- Current team: Old Puget Sound Beach
Amateur team(s)
Years	Team	Apps	(Points)
- Old Puget Sound Beach
International career
Years	Team	Apps	(Points)
2010	USA	0	(0)
- Correct as of November 18, 2010

Brian Howard (born September 9, 1981 in Seattle, Washington) is an American rugby union player. He plays prop for his club, Old Puget Sound Beach RFC. Howard was selected to tour with the USA national rugby union team, the USA Eagles XV, for the Autumn 2010 tour of Europe. He was first selected to the Eagles XV squad in 2010 during the Churchill Cup. Howard also spent two years (2004–2005) playing in the NFL for the St. Louis Rams.
