= Adam Timmerman =

American football player (born 1971)

No. 63, 62
- Position: Guard

Personal information
- Born: August 14, 1971 (age 55); Cherokee, Iowa, U.S.
- Listed height: 6 ft 4 in (1.93 m)
- Listed weight: 310 lb (141 kg)

Career information
- High school: Cherokee (IA) Washington
- College: South Dakota State
- NFL draft: 1995: 7th round, 230th overall pick

Career history
- Green Bay Packers (1995–1998); St. Louis Rams (1999–2006)

Awards and highlights
- 2× Super Bowl champion (XXXI, XXXIV); Second-team All-Pro (2001); Pro Bowl (2001); St. Louis Rams 10th Anniversary Team

Career NFL statistics
- Games played: 187
- Games started: 172
- Fumble recoveries: 5
- Stats at Pro Football Reference

Adam Larry Timmerman (born August 14, 1971) is an American former professional football player who was a guard in the National Football League (NFL). He was a Super Bowl champion for the St. Louis Rams and Green Bay Packers.

He played for Green Bay and St. Louis between 1995 and 2006. A second-team All-Pro selection in 2001, Timmerman went to four Super Bowls in his career, winning Super Bowl XXXI with the Packers and Super Bowl XXXIV with the Rams.

== Early life ==
Timmerman was born in Cherokee, Iowa. He attended Washington High School in Cherokee, Iowa, and starred in football, basketball, and track. In football, he won All-Conference honors, and was an All-State Honorable Mention honoree. In track, he finished eighth in the state track meet on the 110 high hurdles as a senior. Timmerman graduated from Washington High School in Cherokee, Iowa, in 1989.

== College career ==
Timmerman attended South Dakota State University for agribusiness and played college football at South Dakota State. While there, he won two Division II All-America honors, was a two-time First-team Academic All-Conference pick, and as a senior, won the "Jim Langer Award", which is given to the nation's top Division II lineman.

== Professional career ==
=== Green Bay Packers ===
Timmermann was drafted by the Green Bay Packers in the seventh round (230th overall) of the 1995 NFL draft. He played his first four seasons with the Green Bay Packers, making it to two Super Bowls and winning Super Bowl XXXI. Timmerman started every game for the Packers in the 1996–1998 seasons.

=== St. Louis Rams ===
In 1999, Timmerman joined the Rams and won his second Super Bowl ring in Super Bowl XXXIV. He played for the Rams in Super Bowl XXXVI, losing to the New England Patriots. Timmerman was selected for the Pro Bowl in 1999 and 2001, and in 2001 he was called to play in the Pro Bowl due to injuries to other National Football Conference guards. The Rams released Timmerman on February 27, 2007, and he officially retired following the 2006 season.

== Life after football ==
Timmerman returned to his agricultural farming back in Cherokee and became the general manager for ICON Ag and Turf (a John Deere dealer).
