= 2008 New Orleans Saints season =

NFL team season

- Owner: Tom Benson
- General manager: Mickey Loomis
- Head coach: Sean Payton
- Home stadium: Louisiana Superdome

Results
- Record: 8–8
- Division place: 4th NFC South
- Playoffs: Did not qualify
- All-Pros: Drew Brees (2nd team)
- Pro Bowlers: Drew Brees (QB); Jammal Brown (OT)

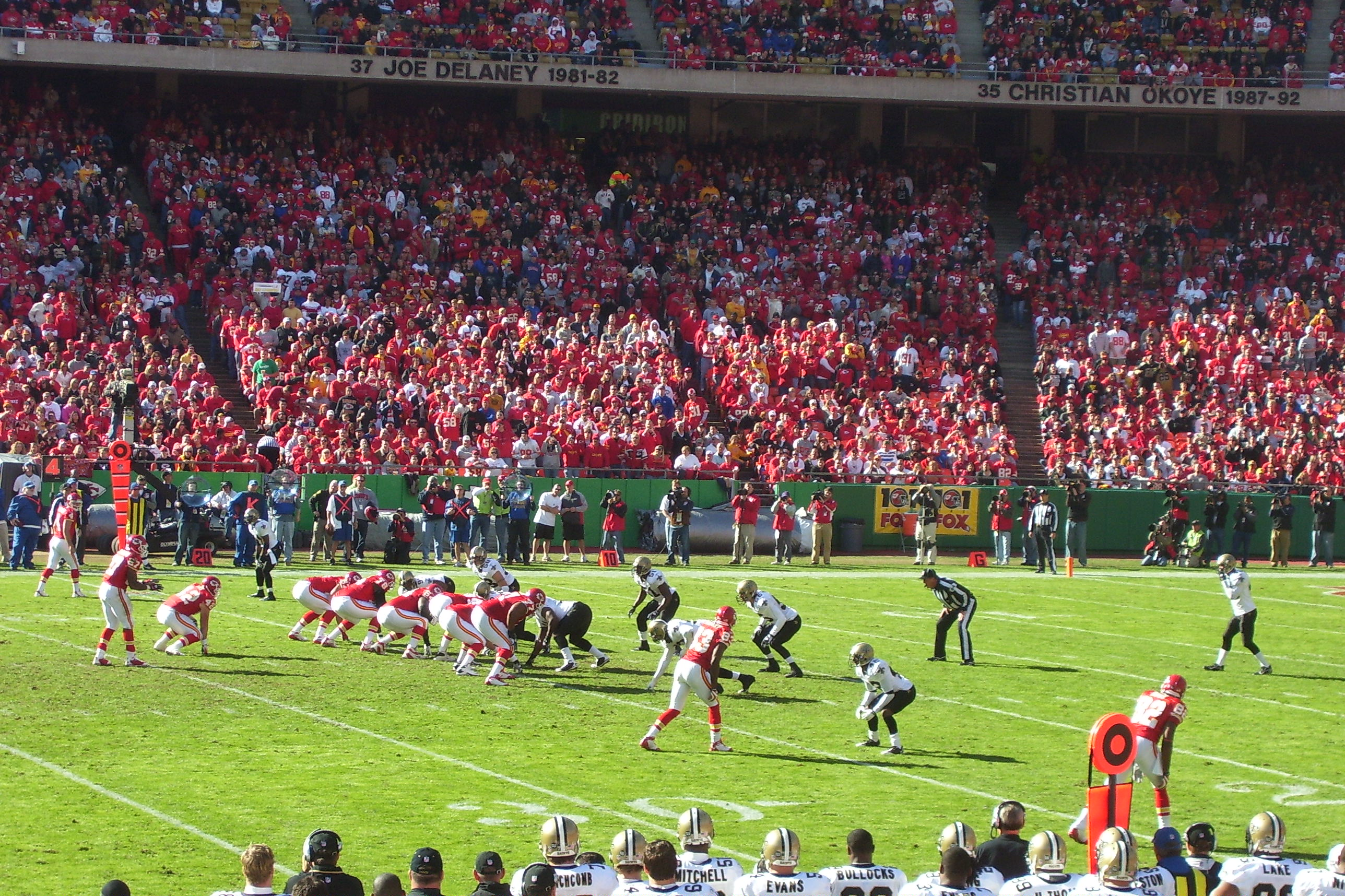
The Saints line up on defense at the Kansas City Chiefs on November 16 in week 11

The 2008 season was the New Orleans Saints' 42nd in the National Football League (NFL), their 33rd playing home games at the Louisiana Superdome and their third under head coach Sean Payton. The Saints improved on their 7–9 record from the 2007 season with an 8–8 record, however, they would miss the playoffs for the second consecutive season. This was the only season under Drew Brees that they finished last in the division, and the Saints would not finish last in the division again until 2024. Despite this, Brees became just the second quarterback to throw for over 5,000 passing yards and won the NFL Offensive Player of the Year Award.

The Saints played the AFC West this season, beating three out of the four teams in that division. They lost to the Denver Broncos, but won against the San Diego Chargers, Oakland Raiders, and Kansas City Chiefs.

== Offseason ==
=== NFL draft ===
2008 New Orleans Saints draft
Round	Pick	Player	Position	College	Notes
1	7	Sedrick Ellis	Defensive tackle	USC	
2	40	Tracy Porter	Cornerback	Indiana	
5	144	DeMario Pressley	Defensive tackle	North Carolina State	
5	164	Carl Nicks *	Offensive tackle	Nebraska	
6	178	Taylor Mehlhaff	Placekicker	Wisconsin	
7	237	Adrian Arrington	Wide receiver	Michigan	
Made roster * Made at least one Pro Bowl during career

== Personnel ==
=== Staff ===
2008 New Orleans Saints staff
Front office: Owner/president – Tom Benson; Owner/executive vice president – Rita Benson LeBlanc; Executive vice president/general manager – Mickey Loomis; Director of football administration – Khai Harley; Director of pro scouting – Ryan Pace; Director of college scouting – Rick Reiprish; Head coaches: Head coach – Sean Payton; Assistant head coach/linebackers – Joe Vitt; Offensive coaches: Offensive coordinator/offensive line – Doug Marrone; Quarterbacks/passing game – Pete Carmichael, Jr.; Running backs – Aaron Kromer; Wide receivers – Curtis Johnson; Tight ends – Terry Malone; Offensive assistant – Joe Lombardi	Defensive coaches: Defensive coordinator – Gary Gibbs; Defensive line – Ed Orgeron; Assistant defensive line – Travis Jones; Secondary – Dennis Allen; Assistant secondary – Tony Oden; Defensive assistant – Joe Alley; Special teams coaches: Special teams coordinator – Greg McMahon; Assistant special teams – Mike Mallory; Strength and conditioning: Head strength and conditioning – Dan Dalrymple; Assistant strength and conditioning – Adam Bailey

== Roster ==
2008 New Orleans Saints roster
Quarterbacks (QB): 9 Drew Brees; 11 Mark Brunell; 3 Joey Harrington; Running backs (RB): 40 Mike Bell; 30 Lynell Hamilton; 44 Mike Karney FB; 26 Deuce McAllister; 23 Pierre Thomas; Wide receivers (WR): 12 Marques Colston; 10 Skyler Green; 19 Devery Henderson; 17 Robert Meachem; 16 Lance Moore; 81 David Patten; Tight ends (TE): 83 Billy Miller; 86 Buck Ortega; 88 Jeremy Shockey	Offensive linemen (OL): 70 Jammal Brown T; 74 Jermon Bushrod T; 73 Jahri Evans G; 76 Jonathan Goodwin C; 68 Matt Lehr C; 68 Jamar Nesbit G; 77 Carl Nicks G; 78 Jon Stinchcomb T; 64 Zach Strief T; Defensive linemen (DL): 92 Remi Ayodele DT; 97 Jeff Charleston DE; 71 Kendrick Clancy DT; 98 Sedrick Ellis DT; 96 Antwan Lake DT; 93 Bobby McCray DE; 79 Rob Ninkovich DE; 91 Will Smith DE; 99 Hollis Thomas DT	Linebackers (LB): 56 Jo-Lonn Dunbar OLB; 54 Troy Evans OLB; 55 Scott Fujita OLB; 50 Marvin Mitchell MLB; 58 Scott Shanle OLB; 51 Jonathan Vilma MLB; Defensive backs (DB): 29 Josh Bullocks FS; 42 Jason David CB; 20 Randall Gay CB; 41 Roman Harper SS; 21 Terrence Holt FS; 35 Michael Lehan CB; 39 Chris Reis SS; 24 Leigh Torrence CB; 28 Usama Young CB; Special teams (ST): 5 Garrett Hartley K; 47 Kevin Houser LS; 4 Glenn Pakulak P	Practice squad: 38 Jermaine Allen RB ^{Int'l}; 36 Marquice Cole CB; 75 Tim Duckworth G; 13 Chris Francies WR; 82 Kolo Kapanui TE; 62 Marvin Philip C; 95 Josh Savage DE; Reserve: 87 Adrian Arrington WR (IR); 25 Reggie Bush RB/PR (IR); 80 Mark Campbell TE (IR); 31 Aaron Glenn CB (IR); 1 Martin Gramatica K (IR); 94 Charles Grant DE (IR); 43 Kevin Kaesviharn FS (IR); 34 Mike McKenzie CB (IR); 22 Tracy Porter CB (IR); 90 DeMario Pressley DT (IR); 60 James Reed DT (IR); 15 Courtney Roby WR/KR (IR); 53 Mark Simoneau LB (IR); 33 Olaniyi Sobomehin FB (IR); 72 Montavious Stanley DT (IR); 27 Aaron Stecker RB (IR); 66 Brian Young DE (IR); Rookies in italics 53 active, 17 reserve, 7 practice squad

== Preseason ==
=== Schedule ===
Week	Date	Opponent	Result	Record	Venue	Recap
1	August 7	Arizona Cardinals	W 24–10	1–0	University of Phoenix Stadium	Recap
2	August 16	Houston Texans	L 27–31	1–1	Louisiana Superdome	Recap
3	August 23	Cincinnati Bengals	W 13–0	2–1	Paul Brown Stadium	Recap
4	August 28	Miami Dolphins	L 10–14	2–2	Louisiana Superdome	Recap

== Regular season ==
=== Schedule ===
Week	Date	Opponent	Result	Record	Venue	Recap
1	September 7	Tampa Bay Buccaneers	W 24–20	1–0	Louisiana Superdome	Recap
2	September 14	at Washington Redskins	L 24–29	1–1	Fedex Field	Recap
3	September 21	at Denver Broncos	L 32–34	1–2	Invesco Field	Recap
4	September 28	San Francisco 49ers	W 31–17	2–2	Louisiana Superdome	Recap
5	October 6	Minnesota Vikings	L 27–30	2–3	Louisiana Superdome	Recap
6	October 12	Oakland Raiders	W 34–3	3–3	Louisiana Superdome	Recap
7	October 19	at Carolina Panthers	L 7–30	3–4	Bank of America Stadium	Recap
8	October 26	San Diego Chargers	W 37–32	4–4	(United Kingdom) Wembley Stadium (London)	Recap
9	Bye					
10	November 9	at Atlanta Falcons	L 20–34	4–5	Georgia Dome	Recap
11	November 16	at Kansas City Chiefs	W 30–20	5–5	Arrowhead Stadium	Recap
12	November 24	Green Bay Packers	W 51–29	6–5	Louisiana Superdome	Recap
13	November 30	at Tampa Bay Buccaneers	L 20–23	6–6	Raymond James Stadium	Recap
14	December 7	Atlanta Falcons	W 29–25	7–6	Louisiana Superdome	Recap
15	December 11	at Chicago Bears	L 24–27	7–7	Soldier Field	Recap
16	December 21	at Detroit Lions	W 42–7	8–7	Ford Field	Recap
17	December 28	Carolina Panthers	L 31–33	8–8	Louisiana Superdome	Recap

== Summary ==
=== Week 1: vs. Tampa Bay Buccaneers ===
Quarter	1	2	3	4	Total
Buccaneers	7	3	3	7	20
Saints	7	0	10	7	24

at Louisiana Superdome, New Orleans, Louisiana

- Game time: 12:00 pm CDT
- Game weather: None (Domed Stadium)
- Game attendance: 69,881
- Referee: Alberto Riveron
- TV announcers (Fox): Thom Brennaman & Brian Billick

The Saints began their 2008 campaign at home against their NFC South foe, the Tampa Bay Buccaneers. In the first quarter, New Orleans drew first blood as QB Drew Brees completed a 39-yard TD pass to WR David Patten. The Buccaneers replied with CB Phillip Buchanon returning an interception 26 yards for a touchdown. In the second quarter, Tampa Bay took the lead with kicker Matt Bryant getting a 37-yard field goal. In the third quarter, the Saints responded with kicker Martín Gramática getting a 34-yard field goal. The Buccaneers answered with Bryant nailing a 33-yard field goal, but New Orleans regained the lead with Brees completing an 84-yard TD pass to WR Devery Henderson. In the fourth quarter, Tampa Bay jumped ahead again as QB Jeff Garcia completed a 2-yard TD pass to WR Ike Hilliard. The Bayou faithful got the last laugh as Brees completed the game-winning 42-yard TD pass to RB Reggie Bush.

With the win, the Saints began their season at 1–0.

=== Week 2: at Washington Redskins ===
Quarter	1	2	3	4	Total
Saints	0	10	14	0	24
Redskins	3	6	6	14	29

at FedExField, Landover, Maryland

- Game time: 1:00 p.m. EDT/12:00 p.m. CDT
- Game weather: 90 °F (32 °C) (Sunny)
- Game attendance: 88,246
- Referee: Bill Carollo
- TV announcers (Fox): Dick Stockton, Brian Baldinger, Brian Billick, & Laura Okmin

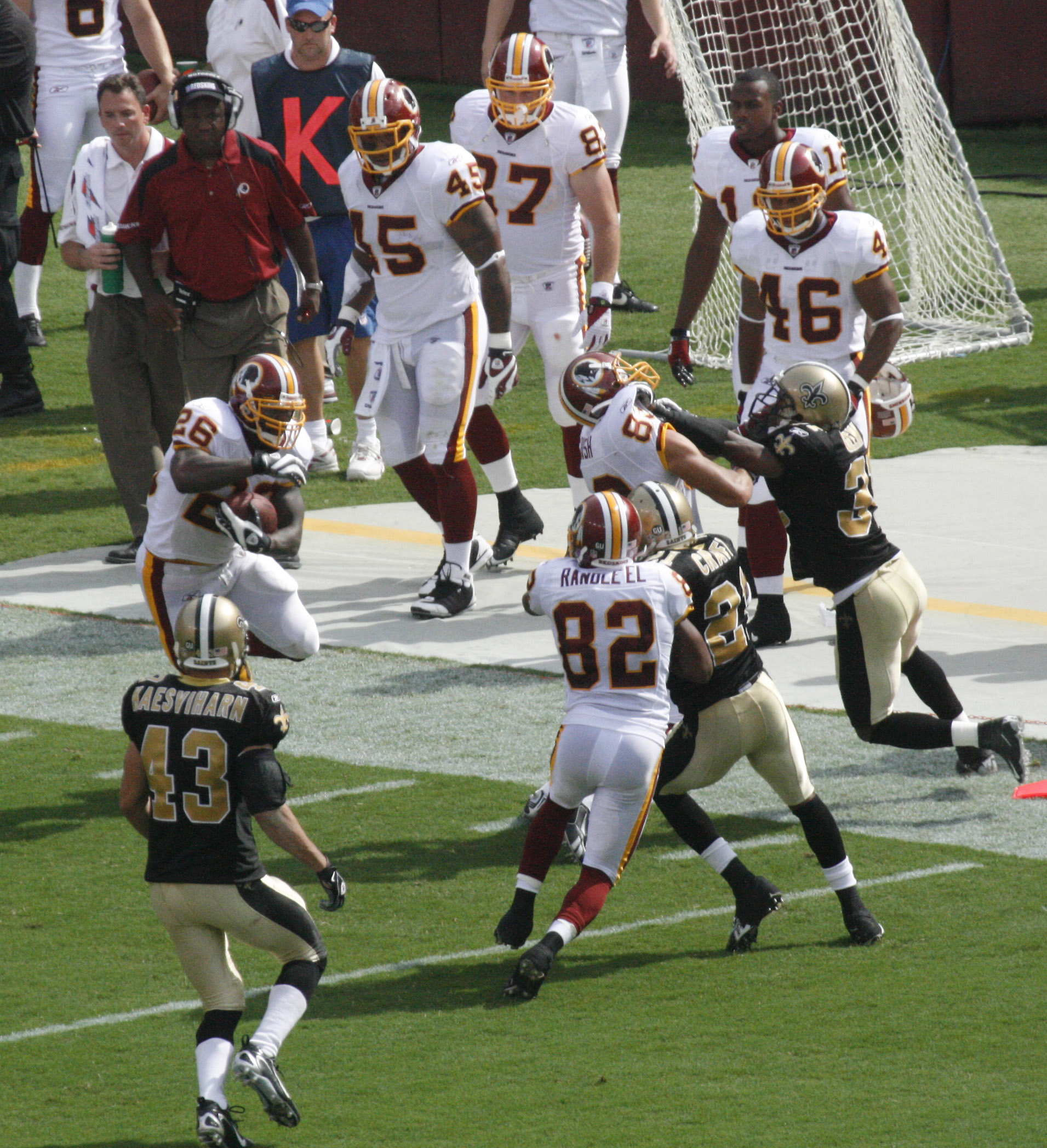
At Washington in week 2

Coming off their divisional home win over the Buccaneers, the Saints flew to FedExField for a Week 2 duel with the Washington Redskins.

In the first quarter, New Orleans trailed early as Redskins kicker Shaun Suisham got a 22-yard field goal. In the second quarter, Washington increased its lead with Suisham's 36-yard field goal. Afterward, the Saints took the lead with RB Pierre Thomas getting a 1-yard TD run and kicker Martín Gramática nailing a 49-yard field goal.

In the third quarter, New Orleans increased its lead with QB Drew Brees completing a 19-yard TD pass to WR Robert Meachem. The Redskins started to fight back as RB Clinton Portis got a 9-yard TD run (with a failed 2-point conversion). New Orleans responded with RB Reggie Bush returning a punt 55 yards for a touchdown. However, Washington rallied with Portis' 8-yard TD run and QB Jason Campbell's 67-yard TD pass to WR Santana Moss.

With the loss, the Saints fell to 1–1.

=== Week 3: at Denver Broncos ===
Quarter	1	2	3	4	Total
Saints	3	16	7	6	32
Broncos	14	10	10	0	34

at Invesco Field at Mile High, Denver, Colorado

- Game time: 2:05 p.m. MDT/3:05 p.m. CDT
- Game weather: 75 °F (24 °C) (Partly Cloudy)
- Game attendance: 75,713
- Referee: Ron Winter
- TV announcers (Fox): Joe Buck, Troy Aikman, & Pam Oliver

Hoping to rebound from their road loss to the Redskins, the Saints flew to Invesco Field at Mile High for a Week 3 interconference duel with the Denver Broncos. In the first quarter, New Orleans trailed early as Broncos QB Jay Cutler completed a 1-yard TD pass to TE Nate Jackson. The Saints answered with kicker Martín Gramática getting a 43-yard field goal. Denver replied with Cutler completing a 35-yard TD pass to WR Brandon Marshall. In the second quarter, New Orleans continued to struggle as Broncos LB Nate Webster returned a fumble 34 yards for a touchdown. The Saints started to rally as RB Pierre Thomas got a 5-yard TD run, while RB Reggie Bush got a 23-yard TD run. Denver answered with kicker Matt Prater getting a 27-yard field goal. New Orleans closed out the half with DE Charles Grant tackling RB Andre Hall in his endzone for a safety.

In the third quarter, the Broncos replied with RB Michael Pittman getting a 2-yard TD run. The Saints answered with QB Drew Brees completing a 6-yard TD pass to Bush, but Denver responded with Prater nailing a 34-yard field goal. In the fourth quarter, New Orleans tried to rally as Thomas got a 10-yard TD run (with a failed 2-point conversion). They even recovered a fumble and got into field goal position. However, Gramática's 43-yard attempt went wide right, ending any hope of a comeback.

With the loss, the Saints fell to 1–2.

=== Week 4: vs. San Francisco 49ers ===
Quarter	1	2	3	4	Total
49ers	3	3	3	8	17
Saints	0	21	0	10	31

at Louisiana Superdome, New Orleans, Louisiana

- Game time: 12:00 pm CDT
- Game weather: None (Domed Stadium)
- Game attendance: 70,008
- Referee: Jeff Triplette
- TV announcers (Fox): Sam Rosen, Tim Ryan, & Chris Myers

Trying to snap a two-game losing streak, the Saints went home for a Week 4 duel with the San Francisco 49ers. In the first quarter, New Orleans trailed early as 49ers kicker Joe Nedney got a 47-yard field goal. In the second quarter, the Saints responded with QB Drew Brees completing a 5-yard and a 33-yard TD pass to WR Lance Moore. San Francisco tried to catch up as Nedney kicked a 49-yard field goal, but New Orleans continued its dominance as Brees completed a 47-yard TD pass to WR Robert Meachem.

In the third quarter, the 49ers tried to rally as Nedney got a 38-yard field goal. In the fourth quarter, the Saints continued its victory march as RB Deuce McAllister got a 1-yard TD run. San Francisco tried to come back as QB J.T. O'Sullivan completed a 5-yard TD pass to WR Isaac Bruce, but New Orleans sealed the win with kicker Martín Gramática nailing a 31-yard field goal.

With the win, the Saints improved to 2–2.

=== Week 5: vs. Minnesota Vikings ===
Quarter	1	2	3	4	Total
Vikings	10	10	0	10	30
Saints	10	0	7	10	27

at Louisiana Superdome, New Orleans, Louisiana

- Game time: 7:30 pm CDT
- Game weather: None (Domed Stadium)
- Game attendance: 70,015
- Referee: Ed Hochuli
- TV announcers (ESPN): Mike Tirico, Ron Jaworski, Tony Kornheiser, Michele Tafoya, & Suzy Kolber

Coming off their home win over the 49ers, the Saints stayed at home for a Week 5 Monday Night duel with the Minnesota Vikings. In the first quarter, New Orleans was first out of the gate as QB Drew Brees completed a 17-yard TD pass to WR Devery Henderson. The Vikings responded with CB Antoine Winfield returning a blocked field goal 59 yards for a touchdown. The Saints answered with kicker Martín Gramática getting a 35-yard field goal. Minnesota replied with kicker Ryan Longwell getting a 53-yard field goal. In the second quarter, the Vikings took the lead as RB Chester Taylor completed a 4-yard TD pass to TE Visanthe Shiancoe, along with Longwell kicking a 33-yard field goal.

In the third quarter, New Orleans began to rally as RB Reggie Bush returned a punt 71 yards for a touchdown. In the fourth quarter, the Saints took the lead with Gramática making a 53-yard field goal and Bush returning a punt 64 yards for a touchdown. However, Minnesota rallied with QB Gus Frerotte completing a 33-yard TD pass to WR Bernard Berrian, along with Longwell nailing the game-winning 30-yard field goal.

With the loss, the Saints fell to 2–3.

This game was the first time in NFL history that a game had a combination of a blocked field goal, a TD pass by a non-quarterback, two field goals of 50+ yards, and two punts returned for touchdowns.

=== Week 6: vs. Oakland Raiders ===
Quarter	1	2	3	4	Total
Raiders	3	0	0	0	3
Saints	0	10	14	10	34

at Louisiana Superdome, New Orleans, Louisiana

- Game time: 12:00 pm CDT
- Game weather: None (Domed Stadium)
- Game attendance: 70,068
- Referee: Terry McAulay
- TV announcers (CBS): Kevin Harlan & Rich Gannon

Hoping to rebound from their MNF home loss to the Vikings, the Saints stayed at home for a Week 6 interconference duel with the Oakland Raiders. In the first quarter, New Orleans trailed early as Raiders Sebastian Janikowski got a 24-yard field goal. In the second quarter, the Saints took the lead as RB Reggie Bush got a 3-yard TD run, along with kicker Taylor Mehlhaff (recently signed due to Martín Gramática out for the year) getting a 44-yard field goal.

In the third quarter, New Orleans added on to their lead as QB Drew Brees completed an 8-yard TD pass to RB Aaron Stecker and a 15-yard TD pass to Bush. In the fourth quarter, the Saints closed out the game with Mehlhaff nailing a 33-yard field goal and Brees completing a 2-yard TD pass to TE Mark Campbell.

With the win, New Orleans improved to 3–3.

With a 21-yard reception in the first quarter, Reggie Bush (14 att/27 yds, 3 rec/40 yards and 2 TDs), collected his 200th reception in his NFL career over the span of just 34 games, tying Anquan Boldin for the NFL record fewest games needed to do so.

=== Week 7: at Carolina Panthers ===
Quarter	1	2	3	4	Total
Saints	0	7	0	0	7
Panthers	3	10	14	3	30

at Bank of America Stadium, Charlotte, North Carolina

- Game time: 1:00 p.m. EDT/12:00 p.m. CDT
- Game weather: 65 °F (18 °C) (Sunny)
- Game attendance: 73,687
- Referee: Peter Morelli
- TV announcers (Fox): Matt Vasgersian, Brian Baldinger, Brian Billick & Laura Okmin

Coming off their home win over the Raiders, the Saints began their road trip at the Bank of America Stadium for a Week 7 NFC South duel with the Carolina Panthers. In the first quarter, New Orleans trailed early as Panthers kicker John Kasay got a 39-yard field goal. In the second quarter, the Saints responded with FB Mike Karney getting a 1-yard TD run. However, Carolina answered with RB Jonathan Stewart getting an 18-yard TD run.

In the third quarter, the Panthers added on to their lead as QB Jake Delhomme completed a 39-yard TD pass to WR Steve Smith and a 4-yard TD pass to WR DeAngelo Williams. In the fourth quarter, Carolina closed out the game with Kasay nailing a 28-yard field goal.

With the loss, New Orleans fell to 3–4.

=== Week 8: vs. San Diego Chargers ===
Quarter	1	2	3	4	Total
Chargers	3	14	3	12	32
Saints	3	20	7	7	37

at Wembley Stadium, London, England

- Game time: 5:00 p.m. GMT/12:00 p.m. CDT
- Game weather: 54 °F (12 °C) (Mostly Cloudy)
- Game attendance: 83,226
- Referee: Tony Corrente
- TV announcers (CBS): Jim Nantz & Phil Simms

Hoping to rebound from their road loss to the Panthers, the Saints flew to Wembley Stadium for the 2008 International Series game with quarterback Drew Brees' former team, the San Diego Chargers. For the game, New Orleans was registered as the home team.

In the first quarter, the Saints drew first blood as rookie kicker Taylor Mehlhaff got a 23-yard field goal. The Chargers responded with kicker Nate Kaeding getting a 33-yard field goal. In the second quarter, New Orleans got a huge lead as Brees completed a 12-yard TD pass to WR Devery Henderson (with a failed PAT), along with RB Deuce McAllister getting a 1-yard TD run. San Diego answered with QB Philip Rivers completing a 12-yard TD pass to RB LaDainian Tomlinson, but the Saints increased their lead as Brees completed a 30-yard TD pass to WR Lance Moore. The Chargers closed out the half as Rivers completed a 12-yard TD pass to TE Antonio Gates.

In the third quarter, New Orleans added on to their lead as Brees completed a 1-yard TD pass to TE Mark Campbell, but San Diego continued to hang around as Kaeding got a 24-yard field goal. In the fourth quarter, the Saints continued its scoring with FB Mike Karney getting a 1-yard TD run. The Chargers tried to rally as Kaeding nailed a 31-yard field goal, Rivers completed a 14-yard TD run to WR Vincent Jackson, and Brees giving San Diego a safety by throwing an incomplete pass into the back of his own end zone. New Orleans' defense held on for the victory.

With the win, the Saints went into their bye week at 4–4.

=== Week 10: at Atlanta Falcons ===
Quarter	1	2	3	4	Total
Saints	3	3	0	14	20
Falcons	7	10	3	14	34

at Georgia Dome, Atlanta, Georgia

- Game time: 1:00 p.m. EDT
- Game weather: None (Domed Stadium)
- Game attendance: 64,826
- Referee: Gene Steratore
- TV announcers (Fox): Ron Pitts, Tony Boselli, & Charissa Thompson

Coming off their bye week, the Saints flew to the Georgia Dome for a Week 10 NFC South duel with the Atlanta Falcons. In the first quarter, New Orleans trailed early as Falcons QB Matt Ryan completed a 16-yard TD pass to WR Roddy White. The Saints responded with rookie kicker Garrett Hartley getting a 24-yard field goal. In the second quarter, Atlanta answered with RB Michael Turner getting a 2-yard TD run. New Orleans replied with Hartley making a 44-yard field goal. The Falcons ended the half with kicker Jason Elam getting a 22-yard field goal.

In the third quarter, Atlanta increased its lead with Elam nailing a 27-yard field goal. In the fourth quarter, the Falcons began to pull away as Ryan completed a 67-yard TD pass to RB Jerious Norwood. The Saints attempted to rally as QB Drew Brees completed a 15-yard TD pass to RB Deuce McAllister, but Atlanta sealed the win with CB Chevis Jackson returning an interception 95 yards for a touchdown. New Orleans ended the game with a meaningless 32-yard TD pass from Brees to WR Lance Moore.

With the loss, not only did the Saints fall to 4–5, but their 4-game winning streak against the Falcons was also snapped as they lost for the first time since 2005.

=== Week 11: at Kansas City Chiefs ===
Quarter	1	2	3	4	Total
Saints	3	10	14	3	30
Chiefs	7	3	3	7	20

at Arrowhead Stadium, Kansas City, Missouri

- Game time: 1:00 p.m. EDT
- Game weather: 53 °F (12 °C) (Sunny)
- Game attendance: 74,159
- Referee: John Parry
- TV announcers (Fox): Thom Brennaman & Brian Billick

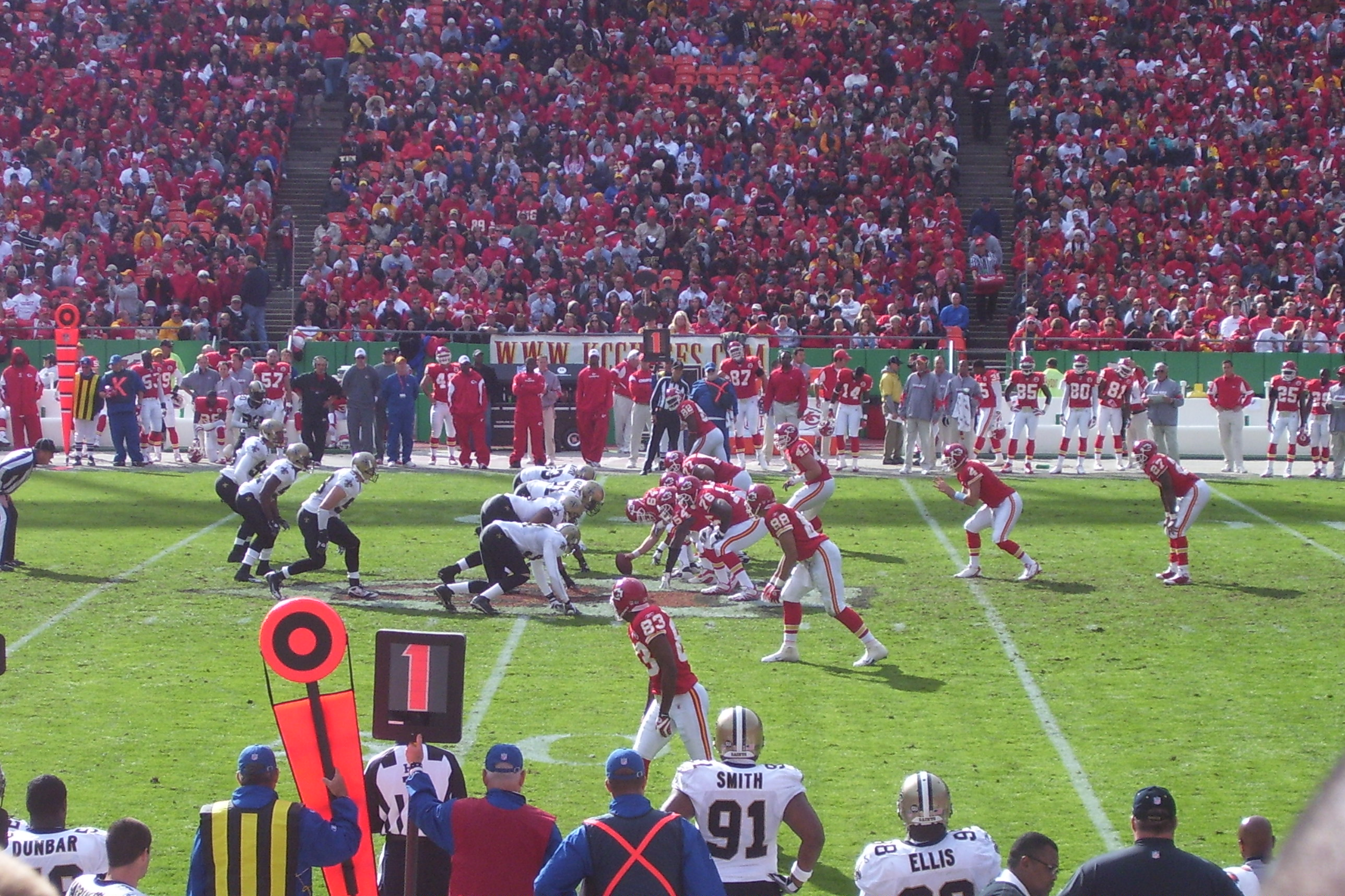
New Orleans at Kansas City, week 11

Hoping to rebound from their divisional road loss to the Falcons, the Saints flew to Arrowhead Stadium for a Week 11 interconference duel with the Kansas City Chiefs. In the first quarter, New Orleans trailed early as Chiefs QB Tyler Thigpen completed a 6-yard TD pass to WR Dwayne Bowe. The Saints responded with rookie kicker Garrett Hartley getting a 30-yard field goal. In the second quarter, New Orleans took the lead as RB Deuce McAllister got a 1-yard TD run. Kansas City answered with kicker Connor Barth getting a 20-yard field goal, but the Saints closed out the half with Hartley making a 23-yard field goal.

In the third quarter, New Orleans increased their lead as QB Drew Brees completed a 47-yard TD pass to WR Lance Moore. The Chiefs replied with Barth getting a 21-yard field goal, but the Saints answered with RB Pierre Thomas getting a 1-yard TD run. In the fourth quarter, Kansas City tried to rally as Thigpen hooked up with Bowe again on a 5-yard TD pass, but New Orleans closed out the scoring as Hartley nailed a 35-yard field goal.

With the win, the Saints improved to 5–5.

=== Week 12: vs. Green Bay Packers ===
Quarter	1	2	3	4	Total
Packers	7	14	0	8	29
Saints	14	10	21	6	51

at Louisiana Superdome, New Orleans, Louisiana

- Game time: 8:30 p.m. EDT/7:30 p.m. CDT
- Game weather: None (Domed Stadium)
- Game attendance: 70,668
- Referee: Walt Coleman
- TV announcers (ESPN): Mike Tirico, Ron Jaworski, Tony Kornheiser, Michele Tafoya, & Suzy Kolber

Coming off their road win over the Chiefs, the Saints went home for a Week 12 MNF duel with the Green Bay Packers. In the first quarter, New Orleans trailed early as Packers FB John Kuhn got a 1-yard TD run. The Saints took the lead as QB Drew Brees completed a 70-yard TD pass to WR Lance Moore (which gave him his 9th-straight game of throwing a pass of 40+ yards, an NFL record), while RB Pierre Thomas got a 4-yard TD run. In the second quarter, Green Bay responded with QB Aaron Rodgers completing a 7-yard TD pass to WR Greg Jennings. New Orleans answered with Brees hooking up with Moore again on a 14-yard TD pass. The Packers tied the game as Rodgers got a 10-yard TD run, but New Orleans regained the lead prior to halftime as rookie kicker Garrett Hartley made a 30-yard field goal.

In the third quarter, the Saints' offense exploded as Brees completed a 16-yard TD pass to TE Billy Miller, RB Deuce McAllister got a 3-yard TD run (which was his 49th career touchdown, making him the franchise's all-time career TD leader), and Brees completed a 70-yard TD pass to WR Marques Colston. In the fourth quarter, Green Bay tried to rally as Rodgers completed a 4-yard TD pass and a 2-point conversion pass to WR Ruvell Martin. Afterward, New Orleans closed out the game with Thomas' 31-yard TD run (with a failed 2-point conversion).

With the win, the Saints kept their playoff hopes alive at 6–5.

=== Week 13: at Tampa Bay Buccaneers ===
Quarter	1	2	3	4	Total
Saints	3	7	0	10	20
Buccaneers	0	6	14	3	23

at Raymond James Stadium, Tampa, Florida

- Game time: 1:00 p.m. EST/12:00 pm CDT
- Game weather: 74 °F (23 °C) (Overcast)
- Game attendance: 64,430
- Referee: Jerome Boger
- TV announcers (Fox): Dick Stockton, Brian Baldinger, & Laura Okmin

Coming off their Monday Night home win over the Packers, the Saints flew to Raymond James Stadium for a Week 13 NFC South rematch with the Tampa Bay Buccaneers. In the first quarter, New Orleans struck first as rookie kicker Garrett Hartley got a 47-yard field goal. In the second quarter, the Buccaneers took the lead as kicker Matt Bryant got a 38-yard and a 23-yard field goal. The Saints regained the lead as QB Drew Brees completed a 13-yard TD pass to WR Lance Moore.

In the third quarter, Tampa Bay regained the lead as RB Carnell "Cadillac" Williams got an 8-yard TD run, along with QB Jeff Garcia completing a 39-yard TD pass to WR Antonio Bryant. In the fourth quarter, New Orleans tied the game as Brees completed a 20-yard TD pass to RB Pierre Thomas, along with Hartley getting a 43-yard field goal. However, the Buccaneers regained the lead as Bryant nailed a 37-yard field goal. The Saints tried to rally, but Brees' third interception prevented any hope of a comeback.

With the loss, New Orleans fell to 6–6.

=== Week 14: vs. Atlanta Falcons ===
Quarter	1	2	3	4	Total
Falcons	0	14	3	8	25
Saints	7	9	0	13	29

at Louisiana Superdome, New Orleans, Louisiana

- Game time: 1:00 pm EDT/12:00 pm CDT
- Game weather: None (Domed Stadium)
- Game attendance: 70,011
- Referee: Bill Leavy
- TV announcers (Fox): Dick Stockton, Brian Baldinger, Brian Billick, & Laura Okmin

Coming off a loss to Tampa Bay, the New Orleans Saints returned home to host the Atlanta Falcons. The Falcons appeared to be on the move on their first drive, but they came up empty after Saints cornerback Jason David intercepted Falcons rookie quarterback Matt Ryan at the Saints' 26-yard line. From there, it took New Orleans only three plays to get into the end zone as Reggie Bush ran for 43 yards and then caught a 5-yard touchdown pass from Drew Brees for the only score of the quarter.

In the second quarter, the Saints added to their lead with a 26-yard field goal from Garrett Hartley. The Atlanta offense finally woke up from there as Ryan completed a 59-yard pass to Roddy White, leading to an eventual 5-yard touchdown run by Michael Turner, cutting the deficit to 10–7. New Orleans responded with a 10-play, 3:39 drive that culminated in a 46-yard field goal by Hartley, extending the Saints' lead to 13–7. Ryan then completed five of six passes on the Falcons' next drive, the last of which was a 2-yard touchdown pass to Brian Finneran, giving the Falcons a 14–13 lead. The Saints then used the final 2:13 of the half to drive to the Falcons' 7-yard line and closed out the half on a 25-yard field goal by Hartley to take a 16–14 halftime lead.

After an exchange of punts to begin the second half, Atlanta drove down to the Saints' 5-yard line by virtue of a long 18-play, 9:15 drive, only to settle for a 23-yard field goal by Jason Elam, which nevertheless gave the Falcons a 17–16 lead. New Orleans responded with an 11-play drive bridging the third and fourth quarters, which ended with Brees' 7-yard touchdown pass to Pierre Thomas, with a failed two-point conversion. The Falcons then marched 73 yards in 11 plays, the last being a 12-yard touchdown scramble by Ryan, plus a successful two-point conversion to Michael Jenkins. But thanks to an 88-yard return by Thomas on the ensuing kickoff, the Saints' drive started off at the Falcons' 16-yard line. With the Saints facing 4th-and 1 at the 7-yard line, New Orleans coach Sean Payton elected to go for it rather than attempt a game-tying 25-yard field goal. Fullback Mike Karney came through for the Saints, getting a first down, and then Thomas gave the Saints a 29–25 lead with a 5-yard touchdown run. The Falcons could not get past their own 35-yard line on the ensuing drive, and they chose to punt the ball back to the Saints' offense, which ran out the clock.

With the win, the Saints kept their slim playoff hopes alive at 7–6. Pierre Thomas piled up 197 all-purpose yards, including 109 yards from scrimmage, 102 of it rushing. This was also the second time in a row that the Saints followed a loss to the Buccaneers with a win over the Falcons.

=== Week 15: at Chicago Bears ===
Quarter	1	2	3	4	OT	Total
Saints	0	7	7	10	0	24
Bears	7	14	0	3	3	27

at Soldier Field, Chicago, Illinois

- Game time: 8:15 p.m. EDT/7:15 pm CDT
- Game weather: 28 °F (−2 °C) (Partly cloudy)
- Game attendance: 61,692
- Referee: Mike Carey
- TV announcers (NFLN): Bob Papa and Cris Collinsworth

With a divisional home win to the Falcons behind them, the Saints flew to Soldier Field for a Week 15 Thursday night battle with the Chicago Bears. New Orleans immediately trailed as Bears safety Danieal Manning returned the game's opening kickoff 83 yards for a touchdown. The Saints answered with quarterback Drew Brees' 2-yard touchdown pass to running back Pierre Thomas, but Chicago struck right back as running back Matt Forte got a 1-yard touchdown run, along with quarterback Kyle Orton getting a 6-yard touchdown run.

The Saints rallied in the third quarter, as Thomas got a 42-yard touchdown run. In the fourth quarter, New Orleans took the lead as kicker Garrett Hartley got a 30-yard field goal, along with Brees completing an 11-yard touchdown pass to wide receiver Marques Colston. However, the Bears tied the game as kicker Robbie Gould made a 28-yard field goal. In overtime, Chicago sealed New Orleans' fate as Gould nailed the game-winning 35-yard field goal.

With the loss, the Saints fell to 7–7 and were eliminated from playoff contention for the second year in a row after Atlanta's 13–10 overtime win over Tampa Bay on December 14.

This marked New Orleans' last loss to the Bears until 2025.

=== Week 16: at Detroit Lions ===
Quarter	1	2	3	4	Total
Saints	14	14	14	0	42
Lions	0	7	0	0	7

at Ford Field, Detroit, Michigan

- Game time: 12:00 pm CDT
- Game weather: None (Domed Stadium)
- Game attendance: 49,309
- Referee: Alberto Riveron
- TV announcers (Fox): Ron Pitts, Tony Boselli, and Charissa Thompson

Coming off their loss to the Bears, the Saints flew to Ford Field for a Week 16 duel with the winless Detroit Lions. New Orleans got the early first quarter lead as wide receiver Robert Meachem got a 20-yard touchdown run, followed by running back Deuce McAllister's 2-yard touchdown run. In the second quarter, the Lions answered with running back Kevin Smith getting a 1-yard touchdown run, but the Saints answered with running back Mike Bell's 1-yard touchdown run, followed by running back Pierre Thomas's 2-yard touchdown run. New Orleans closed out the scoring with quarterback Drew Brees completing 6-yard and a 3-yard touchdown passes to wide receiver Marques Colston.

With the win, the Saints improved to 8–7.

=== Week 17: vs. Carolina Panthers ===
Quarter	1	2	3	4	Total
Panthers	6	17	7	3	33
Saints	0	10	0	21	31

at Louisiana Superdome, New Orleans, Louisiana

- Game time: 1:00 pm EST/12:00 pm CDT
- Game weather: None (Domed Stadium)
- Game attendance: 69,999
- Referee: Jerome Boger
- TV announcers (Fox): Kenny Albert, Daryl Johnston, and Tony Siragusa

Coming off their road win over the Lions, the Saints closed out their season at home in a Week 17 NFC South rematch with the Carolina Panthers. New Orleans trailed early in the first quarter as Panthers kicker John Kasay made 45-yard and 26-yard field goals. In the second quarter, the Saints responded as rookie kicker Garrett Hartley made a 21-yard field goal, but Carolina answered with Kasay's 34-yard field goal, quarterback Jake Delhomme's 8-yard touchdown pass to wide receiver Muhsin Muhammad, and cornerback Dante Wesley's 12-yard fumble return for a touchdown. New Orleans closed out the first half scoring with quarterback Drew Brees completing a 26-yard touchdown pass to wide receiver Marques Colston.

The Panthers added to their lead in the third quarter as running back Jonathan Stewart got a 2-yard touchdown run. In the fourth quarter, the Saints rallied to take the lead as Brees completed a 7-yard touchdown pass to wide receiver Robert Meachem, along with a 9-yard and a 13-yard touchdown pass to wide receiver Lance Moore. However, Carolina took the lead for good as Kasay nailed the game-winning 42-yard field goal.

After being swept by the Panthers, the Saints ended their season at 8–8.

Despite falling 16 yards shy of surpassing Dan Marino for the most single-season passing yards, Brees (30/49 for 386 yards, 4 TDs, 1 INT) joined Marino as the only quarterbacks to throw for 5,000+ yards in a season (5,069).

== Standings ==
NFC South
	W	L	T	PCT	DIV	CONF	PF	PA	STK
^{(2)} Carolina Panthers	12	4	0	.750	4–2	8–4	414	329	W1
^{(5)} Atlanta Falcons	11	5	0	.688	3–3	8–4	391	325	W3
Tampa Bay Buccaneers	9	7	0	.563	3–3	8–4	361	323	L4
New Orleans Saints	8	8	0	.500	2–4	5–7	463	393	L1

== Statistics ==
Final Stats

Source: ESPN

=== Passing ===
Player	G	QB Rat.	Comp.	Att.	Pct.	Yards	TD	INT	Long	Sack
Drew Brees	16	96.2	413	635	65.0	5069	34	17	84	13
Lance Moore	0	0.0	0	1	0	0.0	0	1	0	0

=== Rushing ===
Player	Att.	Yards	Avg.	Long	TD
Reggie Bush	106	404	3.8	43	2
Deuce McAllister	107	418	3.9	19	5
Pierre Thomas	129	625	4.8	42	9
Drew Brees	22	−1	0.0	9	0
Aaron Stecker	8	43	5.4	12	0
Mike Karney	8	10	1.3	3	2
Mike Bell	13	42	3.2	15	1
Devery Henderson	4	33	8.3	30	0
Robert Meachem	1	20	20.0	20	1

=== Receiving ===
Player	Rec.	Yards	Avg.	Long	TD
Reggie Bush	52	440	8.5	42	4
Lance Moore	79	928	11.7	70	10
Jeremy Shockey	50	483	9.7	26	0
Devery Henderson	32	793	24.8	84	3
David Patten	11	162	14.7	39	1
Mark Campbell	12	121	10.1	29	2
Robert Meachem	12	289	24.1	74	3
Billy Miller	45	579	12.9	41	1
Pierre Thomas	31	284	9.2	24	3
Mike Karney	9	18	2.0	7	0
Marques Colston	47	760	16.2	70	5
Deuce McAllister	18	128	7.1	20	1
Olaniyi Sobomehin	2	8	4.0	10	0
Aaron Stecker	9	52	5.8	12	1
Sean Ryan	2	7	3.5	5	0
Buck Ortega	1	3	3	3	0
Mike Bell	1	14	14	14	0

=== Place Kicking ===
Player	1–19 A	1–19 M	20–29 A	20–29 M	30–39 A	30–39 M	40–49 A	40–49 M	+50 A	+50 M	LNG	TOT	PCT	XPM/A	XP PCT	PTS
Martín Gramática	0	0	0	0	3	3	5	2	2	1	53	6/10	60%	16/16	100%	34
Taylor Mehlhaff	0	0	1	1	2	1	1	1	0	0	44	3/4	75%	9/10	90%	18
Garrett Hartley	0	0	5	5	4	4	4	4	0	0	47	13/13	100%	28/28	100%	67

=== Punting ===
Player	Punt	Yards	Avg.	In20	TB	Long
Steve Weatherford	26	1094	42.1	5	3	61
Ben Graham	3	126	42	1	0	44
Glenn Pakulak	24	1144	47.7	3	2	70
