= Scott Shanle =

American football player (born 1979)

No. 54, 58
- Position: Linebacker

Personal information
- Born: November 23, 1979 (age 46); Genoa, Nebraska, U.S.
- Listed height: 6 ft 2 in (1.88 m)
- Listed weight: 245 lb (111 kg)

Career information
- High school: St. Edward (NE)
- College: Nebraska
- NFL draft: 2003: 7th round, 251st overall pick

Career history
- St. Louis Rams (2003); Dallas Cowboys (2003–2005); New Orleans Saints (2006–2012)

Awards and highlights
- Super Bowl champion (XLIV)

Career NFL statistics
- Total tackles: 585
- Sacks: 9
- Forced fumbles: 6
- Fumble recoveries: 4
- Interceptions: 3
- Stats at Pro Football Reference

Scott Allen Shanle (born November 23, 1979) is an American former professional football player who was a linebacker in the National Football League (NFL) for the St. Louis Rams, Dallas Cowboys, and New Orleans Saints. He played college football for the Nebraska Cornhuskers.

== Early life ==
Shanle attended St. Edward High School, where he played eight-man football as a running back and defensive back. After having a 3–6 record in his freshman season, his team went 29–3 over final three seasons. As a senior, he earned All-State and Player of the Year honors.

In track he ran the 100, 200 and 4x100 meter relay. He set school records in both the 100M and 200M with times of 10.67 and 22.3 seconds. He also earned varsity letters in basketball.

== College career ==
Shanle walked-on at the University of Nebraska–Lincoln and earned a football scholarship after he redshirted in the fall of 1998. As a redshirt freshman in 1999, he appeared in every game, mainly as the up-front blocker on the punt return team.

As a sophomore in 2000, he played in all twelve games with ten starts at strongside linebacker, making 55 tackles (fifth on the team), 4 tackles for loss, one sack, 4 quarterback pressures, 2 passes defensed, one interception and one forced fumble.

As a junior in 2001, he made 56 tackles (fifth on the team), 8 tackles for loss, 3 sacks, one fumble recovery and 8 passes defensed that tied the school's linebacker record. As a senior in 2002, he posted 71 tackles (fourth on the team), 5 tackles for loss, 2 sacks, 6 quarterback pressures, one pass defensed and one forced fumble.

== Professional career ==
Pre-draft measurables
Height	Weight	40-yard dash	10-yard split	20-yard split	20-yard shuttle	Three-cone drill	Vertical jump	Broad jump	Bench press	Wonderlic
6 ft 2 1/8 in (1.88 m)	245 lb (111 kg)	4.57 s	1.62 s	2.75 s	4.32 s	7.27 s	36 in (0.91 m)	10 ft 3 in (3.12 m)	20 reps	25
Broad jump from Tennessee Pro Day, all others from NFL Combine.

=== St. Louis Rams ===
Shanle was selected by the St. Louis Rams in the seventh round (251st overall) of the 2003 NFL draft. He made his NFL debut against the New York Giants on September 7. As a rookie, he played on special teams and had 4 tackles, after battling a hamstring injury for most of the season. He was waived on December 10, to make room for guard Scott Tercero who was promoted from the practice squad.

In 2015, he was named one of the best 50 draft picks in the St. Louis Rams history (not counting Los Angeles) by the St. Louis Post-Dispatch newspaper.

In a 2025 ESPN review of all time greatest draft picks by pick Shanle was named the best pick in NFL history for pick number 251. https://www.espn.com/nfl/story/_/id/45597769/picking-best-nfl-draft-picks-ever-every-slot-common-era-1967-2024

=== Dallas Cowboys ===
On December 11, 2003, he was claimed off waivers by the Dallas Cowboys. He was declared inactive for the last 3 games and the playoffs.

In 2004, he ranked fourth on the Cowboys roster with 15 special teams tackles. He became the starter at strongside linebacker in the team's new 3–4 defense for the final three games, in place of an injured Al Singleton, registering 26 tackles which led the team over that span.

In 2005, he served as the Cowboys' nickel middle linebacker. After injuries forced Dat Nguyen into retirement, Shanle moved into the starting lineup at weakside linebacker. He battled injury setbacks (ankle) in the season's final games, tying for seventh on the team with 50 tackles and tied for eleventh with 8 special teams tackles.

On April 28, 2006, he was re-signed to a one-year contract. On August 23, he was traded to the New Orleans Saints in exchange for a seventh round pick (#237-Alan Ball).

=== New Orleans Saints ===
In 2006, he was acquired to improve the linebacker corps, reuniting with head coach Sean Payton, who was the offensive coordinator with the Cowboys. He became a starter at weakside linebacker, leading the team with 77 solo tackles, he was second with 117 total tackles, while registering four sacks, a forced fumble and one pass defensed and helped lead the Saints to the NFC Championship Game vs Chicago.

On February 9, 2007, he signed a four-year extension contract. He started 14 games, recording 96 tackles (56 solo), a pass defensed, a forced fumble, a fumble recovery and one tackle for a loss.

In 2008, he was named the Saints Defensive MVP, after finishing with 145 tackles, 79 solo tackles (second on the team), 8 passes defensed, 2 sacks and one forced fumble.

In 2009, he was a starting weakside linebacker on the Saints' Super Bowl championship team. He started 14 games, missing the last two regular season contests with a concussion. He recorded 106 tackles (74 solo), 2 interceptions, 4 pass defensed and 2 fumble recoveries. He was the team's leading tackler during their playoff run that included wins over opposing quarterbacks Kurt Warner, Brett Favre and Peyton Manning in Super Bowl XLIV.

In 2010, he started 14 games at weakside linebacker, missing contests with a hamstring injury against the Tampa Bay Buccaneers and Cleveland Browns. He posted 98 tackles (46 solo), 3 passes defensed, one forced fumble, one fumble recovery and one special teams tackle.

On July 29, 2011, he signed a two-year contract with the Saints after the Kansas City Chiefs offered a free agent contract. He appeared in 16 games with 14 starts from both the strongside and weakside positions, collecting 84 tackles, one sack, one interception, 5 passes defensed, one forced fumble and 3 special teams tackles.

Shanle finished his 7-year Saints career after playing in a total of 97 games with 94 starts and 673 total tackles (top ten in team history). Since Payton took over as the Saints head coach in 2006, no other linebacker has more tackles than Shanle, and he ranks second defensively in total tackles behind strong safety Roman Harper.

== NFL career statistics ==
Legend
**Bold**	Career high

=== Regular season ===
Year	Team	Games		Tackles					Interceptions					Fumbles			
Year	Team	GP	GS	Cmb	Solo	Ast	Sck	TFL	Int	Yds	TD	Lng	PD	FF	FR	Yds	TD
2003	STL	5	0	3	3	0	0.0	0	0	0	0	0	0	0	0	0	0
2004	DAL	**16**	3	47	35	12	0.0	1	0	0	0	0	1	0	0	0	0
2005	DAL	15	8	45	34	11	1.5	1	0	0	0	0	2	0	0	0	0
2006	NOR	**16**	15	**99**	**74**	25	**4.0**	6	0	0	0	0	1	1	0	0	0
2007	NOR	14	14	69	43	26	0.0	2	0	0	0	0	1	**2**	1	**26**	0
2008	NOR	**16**	**16**	87	60	**27**	2.0	**7**	0	0	0	0	**5**	1	0	0	0
2009	NOR	14	14	69	57	12	0.0	3	**2**	**16**	0	**13**	3	0	**2**	12	0
2010	NOR	14	14	76	55	21	0.0	2	0	0	0	0	2	1	1	0	0
2011	NOR	**16**	15	69	43	26	1.0	5	1	12	0	12	**5**	1	0	0	0
2012	NOR	7	6	21	12	9	0.5	0	0	0	0	0	1	0	0	0	0
		133	105	585	416	169	9.0	27	3	28	0	13	21	6	4	38	0

=== Playoffs ===
Year	Team	Games		Tackles					Interceptions					Fumbles			
Year	Team	GP	GS	Cmb	Solo	Ast	Sck	TFL	Int	Yds	TD	Lng	PD	FF	FR	Yds	TD
2006	NOR	2	2	8	8	0	**1.0**	0	0	0	0	0	0	0	0	0	0
2009	NOR	**3**	**3**	**24**	**20**	**4**	0.0	0	0	0	0	0	**2**	0	0	0	0
2010	NOR	1	1	6	3	3	**1.0**	**1**	0	0	0	0	0	0	0	0	0
2011	NOR	2	2	5	3	2	0.0	0	0	0	0	0	1	0	0	0	0
		8	8	43	34	9	2.0	1	0	0	0	0	3	0	0	0	0
