= 2003 St. Louis Rams season =

NFL team season

- Owner: Georgia Frontiere
- Head coach: Mike Martz
- Home stadium: Edward Jones Dome

Results
- Record: 12–4
- Division place: 1st NFC West
- Playoffs: Lost Divisional Playoffs (vs. Panthers) 23–29 (2OT)
- Pro Bowlers: QB Marc Bulger; WR Torry Holt; T Orlando Pace; DE Leonard Little; S Aeneas Williams; K Jeff Wilkins

The 2003 season was the St. Louis Rams' 66th in the National Football League, their ninth season in St. Louis and their fourth under head coach Mike Martz. The Rams were coming off a disappointing 7–9 season and former MVP Kurt Warner was demoted to backup quarterback; Marc Bulger earned the starting job after replacing Warner in 2002 and winning six of his seven starts. Though many agree that The Greatest Show on Turf ended after the 2001 season, the Rams nonetheless finished 12–4, winning the NFC West, only to lose to the eventual NFC champions Carolina Panthers in double overtime. This would be the last time the Rams won the NFC West until the 2017 NFL season, a year after their return to Los Angeles.

It was the Rams' first home loss in the playoffs since the 1984 season, and ultimately their only home playoff loss during their tenure in St. Louis. 2003 was also the last winning season that the Rams would achieve in St. Louis and was their last winning season anywhere until 2017 in Los Angeles. They did make the playoffs the following season despite a mediocre 8–8 record, considered one of the worst teams to make the playoffs, along with the 2010 Seahawks (7–9), the 1999 Lions (8–8), and the 1998 Cardinals (9–7).

Bulger was voted to play in the Pro Bowl following the season and was the game's MVP. As for Kurt Warner, he was released after the season in order to clear up cap space, and Bulger would spend the next six seasons as the Rams' starting quarterback.

== Offseason ==
Departures: Running Back Trung Canidate was traded to the Washington Redskins for guard David Loverne. Wide receiver Ricky Proehl went to the Panthers. Full back James Hodgins went to the Cardinals. Tight end Ernie Conwell went to the Saints. Wide receiver Troy Edwards went to the Jaguars. Cornerback Dre Bly went to the Lions.

Acquisitions: Acquired offensive tackle Kyle Turley from the Saints in a trade.

=== Draft ===
2003 St. Louis Rams draft
| Round | Pick | Player | Position | College | Notes |
| 1 | 12 | Jimmy Kennedy | DT | Penn State | |
| 2 | 43 | Pisa Tinoisamoa | LB | Hawaii | |
| 3 | 74 | Kevin Curtis | WR | Utah State | |
| 4 | 106 | Shaun McDonald | WR | Arizona State | |
| 4 | 107 | DeJuan Groce | CB | Nebraska | |
| 5 | 148 | Dan Curley | TE | Eastern Washington | |
| 5 | 170 | Shane Walton | S | Notre Dame | Compensatory pick |
| 5 | 172 | Kevin Garrett | CB | SMU | Compensatory pick |
| 6 | 184 | Scott Tercero | G | California | |
| 7 | 251 | Scott Shanle | LB | Nebraska | Compensatory pick |
| 7 | 254 | Richard Angulo | TE | Western New Mexico | Compensatory pick |
Made roster † Pro Football Hall of Fame * Made at least one Pro Bowl during career

== Roster ==
2003 St. Louis Rams roster
| Quarterbacks (QB): 10 Marc Bulger; 4 Scott Covington; 13 Kurt Warner; Running backs (RB): 28 Marshall Faulk; 44 Joey Goodspeed FB; 34 Lamar Gordon; 33 Arlen Harris; Wide receivers (WR): 80 Isaac Bruce; 83 Kevin Curtis; 82 Mike Furrey; 81 Torry Holt; 89 Dane Looker; 84 Shaun McDonald; Tight ends (TE): 87 Cam Cleeland; 86 Brandon Manumaleuna | Offensive linemen (OL): 65 Andy King G; 61 David Loverne G; 67 Andy McCollum G; 76 Orlando Pace T; 70 John St. Clair T; 63 Scott Tercero G; 62 Adam Timmerman G; 68 Kyle Turley T; 77 Grant Williams T; 64 Dave Wohlabaugh C; Defensive linemen (DL): 94 Bryce Fisher DE; 96 Erik Flowers DE; 97 Tyoka Jackson DE; 73 Jimmy Kennedy DT; 92 Damione Lewis DT; 91 Leonard Little DE; 79 Ryan Pickett DT; 98 Grant Wistrom DE; 66 Brian Young DT | Linebackers (LB): 59 Jamie Duncan MLB; 56 Jeremy Loyd MLB; 52 Tommy Polley OLB; 53 Justin Smith OLB; 55 Robert Thomas MLB; 50 Pisa Tinoisamoa OLB; Defensive backs (DB): 31 Adam Archuleta SS; 23 Jerametrius Butler CB; 25 Rich Coady SS; 22 Travis Fisher CB; 21 Kevin Garrett CB; 24 DeJuan Groce CB; 42 Jason Sehorn FS; 32 Fred Weary CB; 35 Aeneas Williams FS; Special teams (ST): 5 Sean Landeta P; 45 Chris Massey LS; 14 Jeff Wilkins K | Practice squad: 90 Nick Burley DE; 16 Michael Coleman WR; 39 Todd Howard CB; 57 Jason McWilliams LB; 47 Spencer Nead TE; Reserve: 58 Andy Eby C (IR); 20 Kim Herring S (IR); 38 Shane Walton S (IR); Rookies in italics 52 active, 3 reserve, 5 practice squad |

== Regular season ==
=== Schedule ===
| Week | Date | Opponent | Result | Record | Venue | Attendance |
|---|---|---|---|---|---|---|
| 1 | September 7 | at New York Giants | **L** 13–23 | 0–1 | Giants Stadium | 78,666 |
| 2 | September 14 | **San Francisco 49ers** | **W** 27–24 (OT) | 1–1 | Edward Jones Dome | 65,990 |
| 3 | September 21 | at **Seattle Seahawks** | **L** 23–24 | 1–2 | Seahawks Stadium | 65,841 |
| 4 | September 28 | **Arizona Cardinals** | **W** 37–13 | 2–2 | Edward Jones Dome | 65,758 |
| 5 | Bye | | | | | |
| 6 | October 13 | Atlanta Falcons | **W** 36–0 | 3–2 | Edward Jones Dome | 66,075 |
| 7 | October 19 | Green Bay Packers | **W** 34–24 | 4–2 | Edward Jones Dome | 66,201 |
| 8 | October 26 | at Pittsburgh Steelers | **W** 33–21 | 5–2 | Heinz Field | 62,665 |
| 9 | November 2 | at **San Francisco 49ers** | **L** 10–30 | 5–3 | San Francisco Stadium | 67,812 |
| 10 | November 9 | Baltimore Ravens | **W** 33–22 | 6–3 | Edward Jones Dome | 66,085 |
| 11 | November 16 | at Chicago Bears | **W** 23–21 | 7–3 | Soldier Field | 61,820 |
| 12 | November 23 | at **Arizona Cardinals** | **W** 30–27 (OT) | 8–3 | Sun Devil Stadium | 42,089 |
| 13 | November 30 | Minnesota Vikings | **W** 48–17 | 9–3 | Edward Jones Dome | 66,134 |
| 14 | December 8 | at Cleveland Browns | **W** 26–20 | 10–3 | Cleveland Browns Stadium | 73,108 |
| 15 | December 14 | **Seattle Seahawks** | **W** 27–22 | 11–3 | Edward Jones Dome | 66,152 |
| 16 | December 21 | Cincinnati Bengals | **W** 27–10 | 12–3 | Edward Jones Dome | 66,061 |
| 17 | December 28 | at Detroit Lions | **L** 20–30 | 12–4 | Ford Field | 61,006 |
Note: Intra-division opponents are in **bold** text.

== Notable Games ==
- September 7 @ New York Giants

Kurt Warner was given one more shot as starter for the Rams and passed for 353 yards and one touchdown to Torry Holt. However, Warner was sacked six times and fumbled on five of them, losing three. The Giants, still smarting from their chaotic playoff loss to the 49ers the previous season, bullied the Rams by recovering the three fumbles and wracking up 146 rushing yards by Tiki Barber en route to a 23–13 win. Warner was briefly hospitalized with a concussion and Rams coach Mike Martz would start Marc Bulger at QB for the remainder of the season.

- September 14 vs. San Francisco 49ers

The Rams and Niners squared off in a tight contest where the game lead tied or changed seven times. Tai Streets and Torry Holt traded touchdown catches in the first quarter, and after a Jeff Chandler field goal put the Niners up 10–7 at the half the game kicked up a gear as Marshall Faulk and Kevan Barlow traded rushing scores in the third, then after two Marc Bulger drives produced ten Rams points and a 24–17 lead Jeff Garcia drove the Niners down field and Terrell Owens' 13-yard catch with 19 seconds to go forced overtime. A missed 43-yard field goal try by Chandler wound up dooming the Niners as the Rams whipped down field in the opening two minutes of overtime and former Niner Jeff Wilkins sank his old team from 28 yards out, and a 27–24 Rams win.

- September 21 @ Seattle Seahawks

The Rams butted their way to a 23–10 lead in the third quarter, but in the fourth it all went away as Matt Hasselbeck found Darrell Jackson in the opening minute of the fourth, then finished off the Rams on Koren Robinson's three yard catch in the closing minute of the fourth and a 24–23 Seahawks win.

Already without Kurt Warner, star running back Marshall Faulk left the game with a fractured left hand, which would sideline him for the next five weeks.

- September 28 vs. Arizona Cardinals

The Rams limited the Cardinals to 161 total yards of offense and put up 401 yards themselves even though Marshall Faulk did not play. Lamar Gordon picked up the slack with 81 rushing yards and a touchdown while Marc Bulger ran in one score and threw touchdowns to Torry Holt and Dane Looker in a 37–13 rout.

- October 13 Monday Night Football vs. Atlanta Falcons

Coming out of their bye week, the Rams hosted the Falcons in the two clubs' first meeting since 2002 divisional realignment put the Falcons into the now-second year NFC South. With Michael Vick sidelined with injury, the Falcons' season was essentially over at 1–4 entering the game, and the Rams merely added more punishment; they downed T. J. Duckett in the Falcons endzone for a safety and put up 496 yards of offense and 36 points in a 36–0 shutout; the last touchdown came when Travis Fisher picked off Kurt Kittner and ran back a 74-yard touchdown.

- October 19 vs. Green Bay Packers

The Rams faced the Packers for the first time since their 45–17 embarrassment of Green Bay in the 2001 playoffs. Marc Bulger's two first-half scores to Torry Holt kept Green Bay from making any serious run as St. Louis stormed to a 34–17 lead, and not even a 76-yard Najeh Davenport touchdown run in the fourth could stop a 34–24 Rams win.

- October 26 @ Pittsburgh Steelers

In a rematch of Super Bowl XIV the Rams faced their former backup quarterback Tommy Maddox. The game lead tied or changed six times as Maddox tossed a pair of scores to Hines Ward but was intercepted three times. Bulger threw for 375 yards and a 36-yard score to Torry Holt. With Marshall Faulk still sidelined, Arlen Harris ran for three touchdowns as the Rams won 33–21.

- November 2 @ San Francisco 49ers

The Rams' four-game win streak ended in a 30–10 thumping at Candlestick Park. Cedrick Wilson opened up scoring with a 95-yard kickoff return score, and it never got better for the Rams. Tim Rattay unloaded three touchdowns to Brandon Lloyd, Terrell Owens, and Tai Streets while Bulger was sacked five times and picked off twice. The Rams run game was limited to nine total yards, all by Arlen Harris.

- November 9 vs. Baltimore Ravens

The Rams faced the Ravens four years after Week One of 1999, and the Rams got back on track. Marshall Faulk returned and despite only 48 rushing yards and three catches for six yards, he managed two touchdowns. The game was a spree of turnovers; the Rams fumbled twice while Marc Bulger was picked off twice (by Ray Lewis and Ed Reed), but the Ravens were even worse; they fumbled four times (Adam Archuleta ran back one fumble 45 yards for the score) while Baltimore quarterbacks (Chris Redman and Kyle Boller) were intercepted three times. The end result was a 33–22 Rams win.

- November 16 @ Chicago Bears

Marshall Faulk exploded to his first 100-yard rushing day of the season as he reached 103 yards. The Bears behind Chris Chandler led 14–3 before the Rams rallied to a 20–14 lead in the fourth. Chandler drove the Bears down and found Dez White for an 11-yard touchdown with 6:03 to go. Bulger was intercepted on the next possession, but the Bears had to punt with 2:55 to go. Bulger completed five passes to the Bears 19, and after a Faulk run Jeff Wilkins booted the winning field goal from 31 yards out and a 23–21 Rams win.

- November 23 @ Arizona Cardinals

The Arizona portion of the Rams' annual New St. Louis vs. Old St. Louis rivalry turned into a wild affair after Marshall Faulk and Isaac Bruce put them up 14–3 in the second quarter. Marc Bulger was picked off by Renaldo Hill and Hill ran back a 70-yard touchdown. In the third Travis Fisher picked off Jeff Blake and stormed 57 yards for a Rams score. Blake found rookie Anquan Boldin, who bounced off two defenders and carried a 54-yard touchdown throw, then early in the fourth another Renaldo Hill pick set up a three-yard Blake score to Boldin. Bulger was then strip-sacked by Ronald McKinnon and the subsequent Neil Rackers field goal put the Cardinals up 27–24. But Bulger completed a key fourth-down throw and Jeff Wilkins drilled a 24-yarder as time expired. In overtime Bulger then ran 18 yards for a key first down, and Wilkins finished off the Cardinals from 49 yards out, ending a 30–27 win, the third overtime game (after the Seahawks-Ravens and Patriots-Houston overtime shootouts earlier that day) of the league weekend.

- November 30 vs. Minnesota Vikings

Despite ten catches for 160 yards and a fifteen-yard touchdown catch, Randy Moss could not help the Vikings stop a 48–17 rout by the Rams. The Rams sacked Daunte Culpepper eight times and forced three Minnesota turnovers. Marc Bulger threw for 222 yards but the longest pass play came when Isaac Bruce completed a 41-yarder to Dane Looker in the third quarter.

- December 8 Monday Night Football @ Cleveland Browns

The 4–8 Browns fell to 4–9 after two interceptions (one a pick-six by Aeneas Williams) and two fumbles aided the Rams to a 26–20 win. Marshall Faulk broke 100 yards for the fourth straight game. They defeated all AFC North opponents for the season.

- December 14 vs. Seattle Seahawks

Entering the game at 10–3, the Rams slammed the door on any Seattle hope for the NFC West title. After Marc Bulger was sacked for a safety, the Rams erupted with 21 first half points, including two Bulger touchdowns, one a 40-yard strike to Torry Holt. Two additional field goals stiff-armed the Seahawks as Matt Hasselbeck led the Seahawks to 20 additional points, insufficient as the Rams salted away a 27–22 win and the division, leaving the Seahawks at 8–6.

- December 21 vs. Cincinnati Bengals

The Rams were now in a tight race with the Eagles for the top seed in the NFC playoffs, and the 49ers gave the Rams some help by winning in overtime at Philly that same day. The Rams for their part picked off Jon Kitna three times and Marshall Faulk had his highest rushing game of the year (121 yards and a score). The 27–10 win put the Rams at 12–3 with the Eagles falling to 11–4.

- December 28 @ Detroit Lions

The NFL held three games on Saturday, and the Eagles routed the Washington Redskins 31–7 to finish 12–4. The Rams needed to defeat the 4–11 Lions to secure the NFC top seed; they were already guaranteed a playoff bye as a top-two seed. Marc Bulger threw for 170 yards and a touchdown as the Rams scored 20 points in the second quarter. But in the second half the Lions erupted; former Ram Az-Zahir Hakim caught a 13-yard touchdown from Joey Harrington as the Lions scored 20 unanswered points. Kurt Warner replaced Bulger in the final ten minutes of the game and completed only four passes for 23 yards; they were the final plays by Warner in a Rams uniform. The 30–20 loss put the Eagles as the NFC's top playoff seed.

=== Standings ===
NFC West
| | W | L | T | PCT | DIV | CONF | PF | PA | STK |
|---|---|---|---|---|---|---|---|---|---|
| ^{(2)} St. Louis Rams | 12 | 4 | 0 | .750 | 4–2 | 8–4 | 447 | 328 | L1 |
| ^{(5)} Seattle Seahawks | 10 | 6 | 0 | .625 | 5–1 | 8–4 | 404 | 327 | W2 |
| San Francisco 49ers | 7 | 9 | 0 | .438 | 2–4 | 6–6 | 384 | 337 | L1 |
| Arizona Cardinals | 4 | 12 | 0 | .250 | 1–5 | 3–9 | 225 | 452 | W1 |

== Playoffs ==
| Round | Date | Opponent | Result | Venue | Attendance | NFL.com recap |
|---|---|---|---|---|---|---|
| Wild Card | First-round bye | | | | | |
| Divisional | January 10, 2004 | Carolina Panthers | L 23–29 (2OT) | Edward Jones Dome | 66,165 | |
