= 2007 New Orleans Saints season =

NFL team season

- Owner: Tom Benson
- General manager: Mickey Loomis
- Head coach: Sean Payton
- Home stadium: Louisiana Superdome

Results
- Record: 7–9
- Division place: 3rd NFC South
- Playoffs: Did not qualify
- Pro Bowlers: None

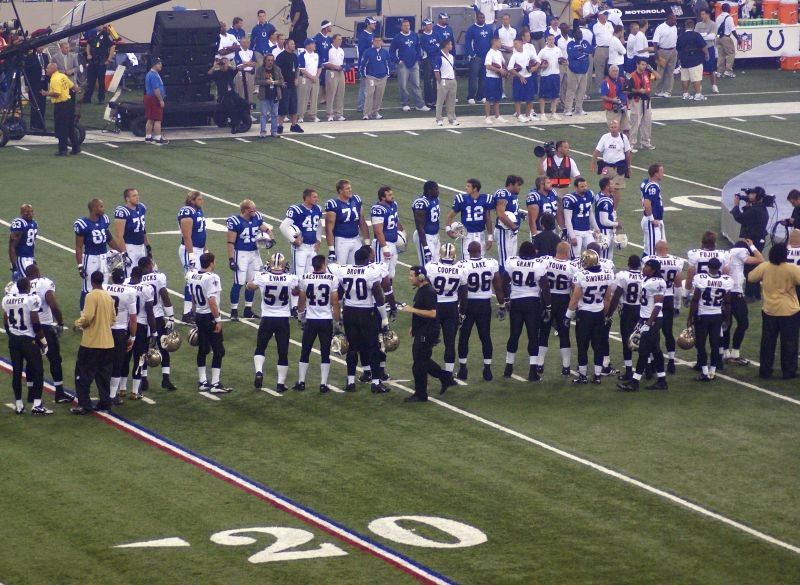
Indianapolis Colts and Saints players line up on NFL opening day, September 6, 2007

The 2007 season was the New Orleans Saints' 41st season in the National Football League (NFL), their 32nd playing home games at the Louisiana Superdome and their second under head coach Sean Payton. The team tried to improve upon its 10–6 record in 2006 and its third division title—the Saints' first in the NFC South. Their other two division titles were in the NFC West, prior to the league's 2002 realignment. After opening up the pre-season in the Pro Football Hall of Fame Game against the Pittsburgh Steelers on August 5, 2007, the Saints ended with a 3–2 pre-season record. The Saints opened the regular season with a nationally televised game against the defending Super Bowl XLI champion Indianapolis Colts, but ultimately had a disappointing season, finishing 2007 with a 7–9 record and were officially eliminated from postseason contention for the first time since 2005. The Saints also had no player make the Pro Bowl for the first time since their 1–15 1980 season.

== Offseason ==
=== NFL draft ===
2007 New Orleans Saints draft
Round	Pick	Player	Position	College	Notes
1	27	Robert Meachem	Wide receiver	Tennessee	
3	66	Usama Young	Safety	Kent State	
3	88	Andy Alleman	Guard	Akron	
4	107	Antonio Pittman	Running back	Ohio State	
4	125	Jermon Bushrod	Offensive tackle	Towson	
5	145	David Jones	Cornerback	Wingate	
7	220	Marvin Mitchell	Linebacker	Tennessee	
Made roster

== Personnel ==
=== Staff ===
2007 New Orleans Saints staff
Front office: Owner/president – Tom Benson; Owner/executive vice president – Rita Benson LeBlanc; Executive vice president/general manager – Mickey Loomis; Vice president of football administration – Russ Ball; Vice president of player personnel – Rick Mueller; Director of college scouting – Rick Reiprish; Director of pro scouting – Ryan Pace; Head coaches: Head coach – Sean Payton; Assistant head coach/linebackers – Joe Vitt; Offensive coaches: Offensive coordinator/offensive line – Doug Marrone; Quarterbacks/passing game – Pete Carmichael, Jr.; Senior offensive assistant/running backs – George Henshaw; Wide receivers – Curtis Johnson; Tight ends – Terry Malone; Offensive assistant – Joe Lombardi	Defensive coaches: Defensive coordinator – Gary Gibbs; Defensive line – Marion Hobby; Assistant defensive line – Dennis Allen; Defensive backs – Tom Hayes; Defensive assistant/secondary – Tony Oden; Defensive assistant – Joe Alley; Special teams coaches: Special teams coordinator – John Bonamego; Assistant special teams – Greg McMahon; Strength and conditioning: Head strength and conditioning – Dan Dalrymple; Assistant strength and conditioning – Adam Bailey

=== Roster ===
2007 New Orleans Saints roster
Quarterbacks (QB): 9 Drew Brees; 10 Jamie Martin; 3 Tyler Palko; Running backs (RB): 24 Chris Barclay; 25 Reggie Bush; 44 Mike Karney FB; 27 Aaron Stecker; 23 Pierre Thomas; Wide receivers (WR): 12 Marques Colston; 18 Terrance Copper; 19 Devery Henderson; 17 Robert Meachem; 16 Lance Moore; 81 David Patten; Tight ends (TE): 85 Ronnie Ghent; 82 Eric Johnson; 83 Billy Miller	Offensive linemen (OL): 65 Andy Alleman G; 70 Jammal Brown T; 74 Jermon Bushrod T; 73 Jahri Evans G; 52 Jeff Faine C; 76 Jonathan Goodwin C; 67 Jamar Nesbit G; 78 Jon Stinchcomb T; 64 Zach Strief T; Defensive linemen (DL): 71 Kendrick Clancy DT; 97 Josh Cooper DE; 94 Charles Grant DE; 92 Orien Harris DT; 96 Antwan Lake DT; 91 Will Smith DE; 99 Hollis Thomas DT; 98 Renaldo Wynn DE	Linebackers (LB): 54 Troy Evans OLB; 55 Scott Fujita OLB; 59 Matt McCoy OLB; 50 Marvin Mitchell MLB; 58 Scott Shanle OLB; 51 Brian Simmons OLB; 53 Mark Simoneau MLB; Defensive backs (DB): 20 Jay Bellamy SS; 29 Josh Bullocks FS; 21 Jason Craft CB; 42 Jason David CB; 41 Roman Harper SS; 43 Kevin Kaesviharn FS; 39 Chris Reis SS; 22 Fred Thomas CB; 38 Usama Young CB; Special teams (ST): 47 Kevin Houser LS; 1 Martin Gramatica K; 7 Steve Weatherford P	Practice squad: 84 Aaron Brown WR; 75 Tim Duckworth G; 40 Kevin Dudley FB; 62 Marcus Green DT; 86 Buck Ortega TE; 36 Anwar Phillips CB; 88 Dante Ridgeway WR (IR); 93 Josh Savage DE; Reserve: 69 McKinley Boykin DT (IR); 35 Jamaal Branch RB (IR); 80 Mark Campbell TE (IR); 37 Steve Gleason S (IR); 2 Olindo Mare K (IR); 26 Deuce McAllister RB (IR); 34 Mike McKenzie CB (IR); 66 Brian Young DT (IR); Rookies in italics 53 active, 9 reserve, 7 practice squad

== Preseason ==
=== Schedule ===
Week	Date	Opponent	Result	Record	Venue	Recap
HOF	August 5	vs. Pittsburgh Steelers	L 7–20	0–1	Fawcett Stadium (Canton, Ohio)	Recap
1	August 10	Buffalo Bills	L 10–13	0–2	Louisiana Superdome	Recap
2	August 18	Cincinnati Bengals	W 27–19	1–2	Paul Brown Stadium	Recap
3	August 23	at Kansas City Chiefs	W 30–7	2–2	Arrowhead Stadium	Recap
4	August 30	Miami Dolphins	W 7–0	3–2	Louisiana Superdome	Recap

== Regular season ==
=== Schedule ===
Week	Date	Opponent	Result	Record	Venue	Recap
1	September 6	at Indianapolis Colts	L 10–41	0–1	RCA Dome	Recap
2	September 16	at Tampa Bay Buccaneers	L 14–31	0–2	Raymond James Stadium	Recap
3	September 24	Tennessee Titans	L 14–31	0–3	Louisiana Superdome	Recap
4	Bye					
5	October 7	Carolina Panthers	L 13–16	0–4	Louisiana Superdome	Recap
6	October 14	at Seattle Seahawks	W 28–17	1–4	Qwest Field	Recap
7	October 21	Atlanta Falcons	W 22–16	2–4	Louisiana Superdome	Recap
8	October 28	at San Francisco 49ers	W 31–10	3–4	Monster Park	Recap
9	November 4	Jacksonville Jaguars	W 41–24	4–4	Louisiana Superdome	Recap
10	November 11	St. Louis Rams	L 29–37	4–5	Louisiana Superdome	Recap
11	November 18	at Houston Texans	L 10–23	4–6	Reliant Stadium	Recap
12	November 25	at Carolina Panthers	W 31–6	5–6	Bank of America Stadium	Recap
13	December 2	Tampa Bay Buccaneers	L 23–27	5–7	Louisiana Superdome	Recap
14	December 10	at Atlanta Falcons	W 34–14	6–7	Georgia Dome	Recap
15	December 16	Arizona Cardinals	W 31–24	7–7	Louisiana Superdome	Recap
16	December 23	Philadelphia Eagles	L 23–38	7–8	Louisiana Superdome	Recap
17	December 30	at Chicago Bears	L 25–33	7–9	Soldier Field	Recap

== Standings ==
NFC South
	W	L	T	PCT	DIV	CONF	PF	PA	STK
^{(4)} Tampa Bay Buccaneers	9	7	0	.563	5–1	8–4	334	270	L2
Carolina Panthers	7	9	0	.438	3–3	7–5	267	347	W1
New Orleans Saints	7	9	0	.438	3–3	6–6	379	388	L2
Atlanta Falcons	4	12	0	.250	1–5	3–9	259	414	W1

== Week-by-week results ==
=== Week 1: at Indianapolis Colts ===
Quarter	1	2	3	4	Total
Saints	0	10	0	0	10
Colts	7	3	14	17	41

at RCA Dome, Indianapolis, Indiana

- Game time: 8:30 p.m. EDT/7:30 p.m. CDT
- Game weather: Game played indoors (Domed stadium)
- Game attendance: 57,361
- Referee: Walt Anderson
- TV announcers (NBC): Al Michaels and John Madden

==== Game summary ====
The 2007 New Orleans Saints began their regular season in the annual Thursday night Kickoff game against the defending Super Bowl champion Indianapolis Colts. In the first quarter, New Orleans trailed early as Super Bowl XLI MVP Peyton Manning completed a 27-yard TD pass to WR Marvin Harrison for the score of the period. In the second quarter, the Saints managed to get their only touchdown of the game as CB Jason David (a former Colt) returned a fumble 55 yards to the endzone. Afterwards, New Orleans took the lead with kicker Olindo Mare getting a 34-yard field goal. Indianapolis tied the game prior to halftime with kicker Adam Vinatieri nailing a 33-yard field goal. In the second half, the Colts dominated the rest of the game. During the third quarter, RB Joseph Addai got a 2-yard TD run, while Manning hooked up with WR Reggie Wayne on a 29-yard TD pass. For the fourth quarter, Indianapolis wrapped up the game with Vinatieri getting a 33-yard field goal, Manning & Wayne hooking up with each other again on a 45-yard TD pass, and safety Matt Giordano returning an interception 83 yards for a touchdown.

With the loss, the Saints began the year at 0–1.

==== Scoring summary ====
Q1 – IND – 1:36 – 27-yard TD pass from Peyton Manning to Marvin Harrison (Adam Vinatieri kick) (IND 7–0)

Q2 – NO – 11:32 – Jason David 55-yard fumble return TD (Olindo Mare kick) (7–7)

Q2 – NO – 6:30 – Olindo Mare 34-yard FG (NO 10-7)

Q2 – IND – 0:45 – Adam Vinatieri 33-yard FG (10–10)

Q3 – IND – 9:45 – Joseph Addai 2-yard TD run (Vinatieri kick) (IND 17–10)

Q3 – IND – 6:11 – 29-yard TD pass from Peyton Manning to Reggie Wayne (Vinatieri kick) (IND 24–10)

Q4 – IND – 14:12 – Adam Vinatieri 33-yard FG (IND 27–10)

Q4 – IND – 10:05 – 45-yard TD pass from Peyton Manning to Reggie Wayne (Vinatieri kick) (IND 34–10)

Q4 – IND – 0:55 – Matt Giordano 83-yard interception return TD (Vinatieri kick) (IND 41–10)

=== Week 2: at Tampa Bay Buccaneers ===
Quarter	1	2	3	4	Total
Saints	0	0	7	7	14
Buccaneers	7	14	7	3	31

at Raymond James Stadium, Tampa, Florida

- Game time: 1:00 p.m. EDT/12:00 p.m. CDT
- Game weather: 88 °F (31 °C) (Partly Cloudy)
- Game attendance: 65,178
- Referee: Gerry Austin
- TV announcers (Fox): Sam Rosen (play-by-play) and Tim Ryan (color commentator)

==== Game summary ====
Following their season opening loss to the Colts, the Saints flew to Raymond James Stadium for an NFC South duel with the Tampa Bay Buccaneers. In the first quarter, New Orleans trailed early as Bucs RB Carnell "Cadillac" Williams got a 1-yard TD run for the only score of the period. In the second quarter, the Saints continued to struggle as Tampa Bay QB Jeff Garcia hooked up with WR Joey Galloway on a 69-yard TD pass and a 24-yard pass.

In the third quarter, the Buccaneers extended their lead with Williams getting another 1-yard TD run. Afterwards, New Orleans finally got on the board with FB Mike Karney getting a 1-yard TD run. However, in the fourth quarter, Tampa Bay closed out the game with kicker Matt Bryant's 27-yard field goal. The Saints got the final score of the game as QB Drew Brees completed a 4-yard TD pass to WR Marques Colston.

With the loss, the Saints fell to 0–2.

Scoring summary
Q	Team	Time	Scoring play	Score
1	TB	5:30	Williams 1-yard TD run (Bryant kick)	TB 7–0
2	TB	13:23	69-yard TD pass from Garcia to Galloway (Bryant kick)	TB 14–0
2	TB	1:12	24-yard TD pass from Garcia to Galloway (Bryant kick)	TB 21–0
3	TB	4:32	Williams 1-yard TD run (Bryant kick)	TB 28–0
3	NO	5:55	Karney 1-yard TD run (Mare kick)	TB 28–7
4	TB	7:35	Bryant 27-yard FG	TB 31–7
4	NO	2:56	4-yard TD pass from Brees to Colston (Mare kick)	TB 31–14

=== Week 3: vs. Tennessee Titans ===
Quarter	1	2	3	4	Total
Titans	10	0	7	14	31
Saints	0	7	7	0	14

at Louisiana Superdome, New Orleans, Louisiana

- Game weather: Game Played Indoors (Domed Stadium)
- Game attendance: 70,002
- Referee: Mike Carey
- TV announcers (ESPN): Mike Tirico (play-by-play), Tony Kornheiser (color commentator), Ron Jaworski (color commentator), Michele Tafoya (sideline reporter), & Suzy Kolber (sideline reporter)

Trying to snap a two-game skid, the Saints played their Week 3 Monday night homeopener, as they played an interconference duel with the Tennessee Titans. In the first quarter, New Orleans' struggles continued as Titans kicker Rob Bironas nailed a 33-yard field goal, while QB Vince Young completed a 35-yard TD pass to WR Brandon Jones. In the second quarter, the Saints managed to get the only score of the period as RB Reggie Bush got a 1-yard TD run. In the third quarter, New Orleans took the lead with Bush getting another 1-yard TD run. However, Tennessee regained the lead with RB LenDale White's 1-yard TD run. In the fourth quarter, the Titans took over as Young completed a 3-yard TD pass to TE Bo Scaife, while Vincent Fuller ended the game with an interception return of 61 yards for a touchdown. In the game, QB Drew Brees was 29 of 45 for 225 yards with 4 interceptions (3 of them coming from LB Keith Bulluck).

With the loss, the Saints entered their Bye Week at 0–3.

Scoring summary
Q	Team	Time	Scoring play	Score
1	TEN	2:44	Bironas 33-yard FG	TEN 3–0
2	TEN	12:55	Jones 35-yard TD pass from Young (Bironas kick)	TEN 10–0
2	NO	1:00	Bush 1-yard TD run (Mare kick)	TEN 10–7
3	NO	7:55	Bush 1-yard TD run (Mare kick)	NO 14-10
3	TEN	2:19	White 1-yard TD run (Bironas kick)	TEN 17–14
4	TEN	8:55	Scaife 3-yard TD pass from Young (Bironas kick)	TEN 24–14
4	TEN	2:39	Fuller 61-yard interception return TD (Bironas kick)	TEN 31–14

=== Week 5: vs. Carolina Panthers ===
Quarter	1	2	3	4	Total
Panthers	3	3	0	10	16
Saints	3	3	7	0	13

at Louisiana Superdome, New Orleans, Louisiana

- Game time: 1:00 p.m. EDT/12:00 p.m. CDT
- Game weather: Game Played Indoors (Domed Stadium)
- Game attendance: 70,001
- Referee: Gene Steratore
- TV announcers (Fox): Chris Myers (play-by-play) and Brian Baldinger (color commentator)

==== Game summary ====
Coming off their bye week and still in search of their first win of the year, the Saints stayed at home at played a Week 5 divisional duel with the Carolina Panthers. In the first quarter, New Orleans trailed early as Panthers kicker John Kasay got a 23-yard field goal. The Saints responded with kicker Olindo Mare getting a 25-yard field goal. In the second quarter, the Panthers retook the lead with Kasay's 35-yard field goal. New Orleans responded with Mare kicking a 28-yard field goal.

In the third quarter, the Saints took the lead with FB Mike Karney getting a 2-yard TD run for the only score of the period. However, in the fourth quarter, Carolina came back to win with QB David Carr completing a 17-yard TD pass to WR Steve Smith, along with Kasay's 52-yard field goal as time ran out.

With the loss, the Saints fell to their first 0–4 start since 1996.

=== Week 6: at Seattle Seahawks ===
Quarter	1	2	3	4	Total
Saints	7	21	0	0	28
Seahawks	0	10	0	7	17

at Qwest Field, Seattle

- Game time: 5:15 PM PDT
- Game weather: Sunny; 68 °F (20 °C); Humidity: 47%; Wind: SW 4 mph (6.4 km/h)
- Game attendance: 68,296
- Referee: Jeff Triplette
- TV announcers (NBC): Al Michaels and John Madden

Scoring summary:

Q1 – NO – 12:38 – Pierre Thomas 5-yard fumble return (Olindo Mare kick) [NO 7-0 SEA]

Q2 – NO – 14:28 – Eric Johnson 3-yard pass from Drew Brees (Olindo Mare kick) (13–86, 7:04) [NO 14-0 SEA]

Q2 – NO – 5:18 – Lance Moore 7-yard run (Olindo Mare kick) (6–66, 2:48) [NO 21-0 SEA]

Q2 – SEA – 2:16 – Ben Obomanu 17-yard pass from Matt Hasselbeck (Josh Brown kick) (7–63 3:02) [NO 21-7 SEA]

Q2 – NO – 0:30 – Marques Colston 2-yard pass from Drew Brees (Olindo Mare kick) (9–80 1:46) [NO 28-7 SEA]

Q2 – SEA – 0:02 – Josh Brown 52-yard FG (4–38 0:28) [NO 28-10 SEA]

Q4 – SEA – 6:39 – Nate Burleson 22-yard pass from Matt Hasselbeck (Josh Brown kick) (6–80 1:31) [NO 28-17 SEA]

=== Week 7: vs. Atlanta Falcons ===
Quarter	1	2	3	4	Total
Falcons	3	10	0	3	16
Saints	7	0	7	8	22

at Louisiana Superdome, New Orleans, Louisiana

- Game time: 1:00 p.m. EDT/12:00 p.m. CDT
- Game weather: Game Played Indoors (Domed Stadium)
- Game attendance: 69,994
- Referee: Walt Anderson
- TV announcers (Fox): Chris Rose (play-by-play) and Terry Donahue (color commentator)

Coming off of their road win over the Seahawks, the Saints went home for a Week 7 divisional duel with the Atlanta Falcons. In the first quarter, New Orleans drew first blood as QB Drew Brees completed a 37-yard TD pass to WR Devery Henderson. The Falcons replied with former Saints kicker Morten Andersen getting a 38-yard field goal. In the second quarter, Atlanta took lead with Andersen kicking a 33-yard field goal, along with QB Byron Leftwich completing a 9-yard TD pass to WR Roddy White.

In the third quarter, New Orleans regained the lead with rookie RB Pierre Thomas getting a 24-yard TD run for the only score of the period. In the fourth quarter, the Falcons tried to rally as Andersen kicked a 21-yard field goal. The Saints sealed the win with Brees completing a 4-yard TD pass to RB Reggie Bush, with Bush getting the 2-point conversion on the ground.

With the win, New Orleans improved to 2–4.

=== Week 8: at San Francisco 49ers ===
Quarter	1	2	3	4	Total
Saints	10	14	0	7	31
49ers	0	0	3	7	10

at Bill Walsh Field at Monster Park, San Francisco, California

- Game time: 1:17 PM PDT
- Game weather: 63 °F (17 °C) (Sunny)
- Game attendance: 68,244
- Referee: John Parry
- TV announcers (Fox): Matt Vasgersian (play-by-play) and J.C. Pearson (color commentator)

Coming off their divisional home win over the Falcons, the Saints flew to Monster Park for a Week 8 intraconference duel with the San Francisco 49ers. In the first quarter, New Orleans drew first blood with QB Drew Brees completing a 17-yard TD pass to WR Marques Colston, along with kicker Olindo Mare getting a 26-yard field goal. In the second quarter, the Saints continued their offensive revival with Brees completing a 2-yard TD pass to WR Terrance Copper, along with a 3-yard TD pass to Colston.

In the third quarter, the 49ers tried to come back as kicker Joe Nedney nailed a 29-yard field goal. In the fourth quarter, New Orleans managed to put the game out of reach with Brees and Colston hooking up with each other one last time on a 15-yard TD pass. Afterwards, San Francisco's only response was by QB Alex Smith completing a 7-yard TD pass to TE Vernon Davis.

With the win, the Saints improved to 3–4.

=== Week 9: vs. Jacksonville Jaguars ===
Quarter	1	2	3	4	Total
Jaguars	17	0	7	0	24
Saints	17	7	14	3	41

at Louisiana Superdome, New Orleans, Louisiana

- Game attendance: 70,009
- Referee: Gerry Austin
- TV announcers (CBS): Dick Enberg (play-by-play) & Randy Cross (color commentator)

Coming off their road win over the 49ers, the Saints went home for a Week 9 interconference duel with the Jacksonville Jaguars. In the first quarter, New Orleans drew first blood as kicker Olindo Mare managed to get a 46-yard field goal, while RB Reggie Bush got a 1-yard TD run. The Jaguars responded with QB Quinn Gray completing an 80-yard TD pass to WR Reggie Williams, along with former Saints kicker John Carney getting a 30-yard field goal. New Orleans responded with QB Drew Brees completing a 2-yard TD pass to Bush. However, Jacksonville immediately answered as RB Maurice Jones-Drew returned a kickoff 100 yards for a touchdown to end the period. In the second quarter, the Saints regained the lead as Brees completed an 8-yard TD pass to WR Lance Moore for the only score of the period.

In the third quarter, New Orleans increased its lead with CB Mike McKenzie returning an interception 75 yards for a touchdown, while Brees completed a 4-yard TD pass to WR David Patten. In the fourth quarter, the Jaguars tried to come back as Gray completed a 15-yard TD pass to WR Dennis Northcutt. The Saints closed out the game with Mare nailing a 34-yard field goal.

With the win, New Orleans improved to 4–4.

=== Week 10: vs. St. Louis Rams ===
Quarter	1	2	3	4	Total
Rams	7	10	10	10	37
Saints	7	0	0	22	29

at Louisiana Superdome, New Orleans, Louisiana

- Game weather: Game Played Indoors (Domed Stadium)
- Game attendance: 70,003
- Referee: Scott Green
- TV announcers (Fox): Sam Rosen (play-by play) & Tim Ryan (color commentator)

Coming off a 41–24 victory over the Jaguars, the Saints stayed home to face the winless St. Louis Rams. The Saints started the game with an impressive opening drive that culminated in a 7-yard burst by Reggie Bush to give the Saints an early 7–0 lead. However, Rams running back Stephen Jackson answered with a 1-yard run of his own to tie the game toward the end of the 1st quarter.

Midway through the 2nd quarter, tight end Randy McMichael gave the Rams a 14–7 lead on a 2-yard pass from Jackson. Jeff Wilkins made it a two-score game with a 49-yard field goal three minutes later. The Saints went to the locker room trailing 17–7.

In the 2nd half, Wilkins kicked his 2nd field goal of the game, a 21-yard attempt, to increase the lead to 13. Toward the end of the 3rd, Isaac Bruce caught a 9-yard pass by Marc Bulger to make it a 27–7 lead, putting the Saints in danger of losing their first game since early October.

Drew Bennett added to the St. Louis lead by catching a three-yard pass by Bulger to give Bulger his second touchdown of the game, and to give St. Louis a surprising 34–7 lead. Drew Brees and Billy Miller hooked up for a 1-yard pass with 11:36 left to cut the lead to 34–13. The Saints then converted a two-point conversion on a Bush run, to make it 34–15. Aaron Stecker then scored on a two-yard run with 4:42 remaining to cut it to 34–21. This time, however, they failed on the two-point conversion. With 1:55 left, a Wilkins field goal made it 37–21. The Saints scored another touchdown with 37 seconds left, but their attempt to recover the ball from an onside kick failed, and the Rams held on to defeat the Saints 37–29, giving the Rams their first victory in 2007 and dropping the Saints to 4–5.

=== Week 11: at Houston Texans ===
Quarter	1	2	3	4	Total
Saints	3	7	0	0	10
Texans	7	10	0	6	23

at Reliant Stadium, Houston, Texas

- Game time: 1:00 p.m. EDT/12:00 p.m. CDT
- Game weather: Dome Closed
- Game attendance: 70,780
- Referee: Mike Carey
- TV announcers (Fox): Chris Rose (play-by-play) and Terry Donahue (color commentator)

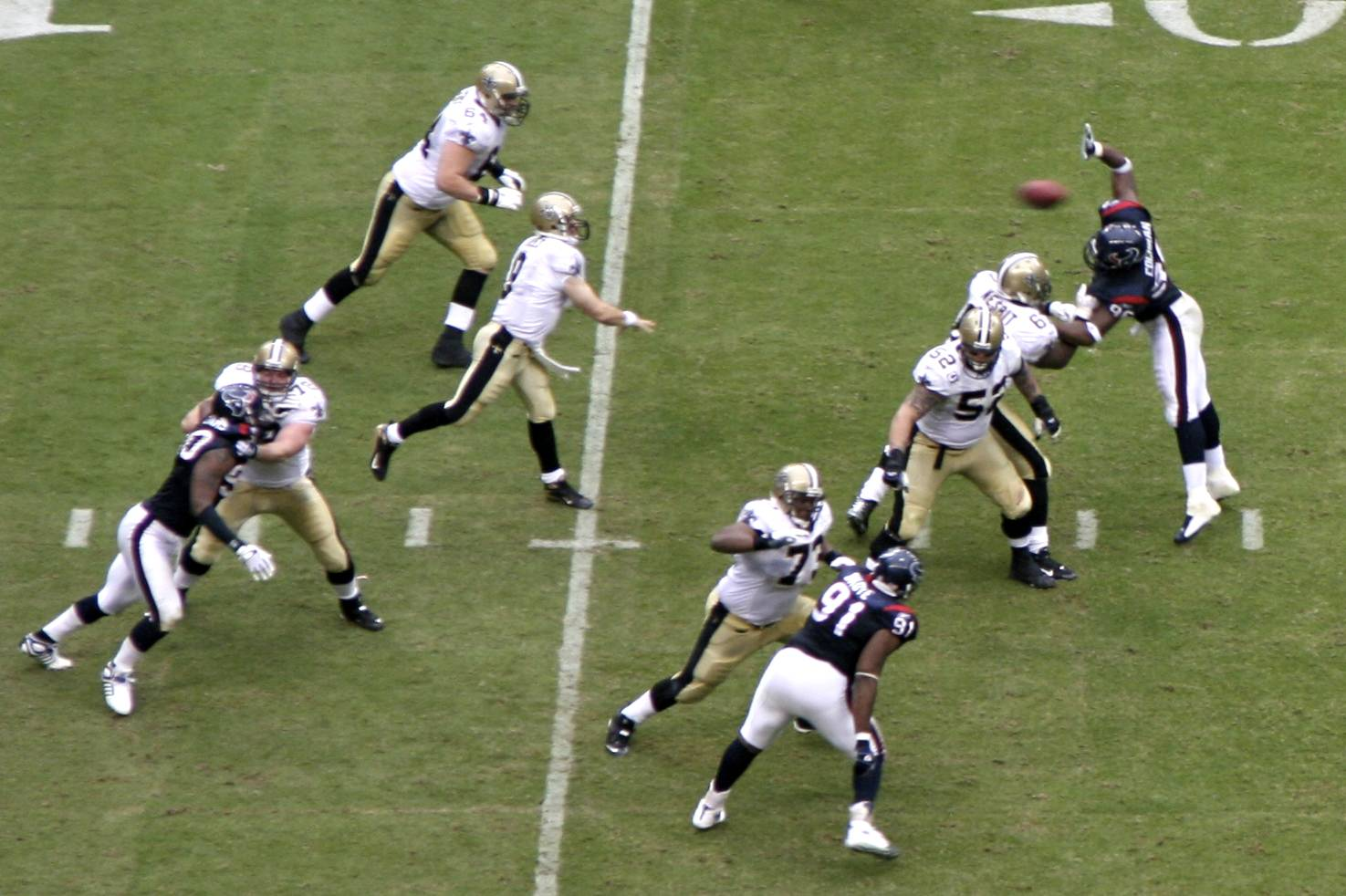
Brees passing against the Houston Texans, week 11

Hoping to rebound from their loss to the Rams, the Saints flew to Reliant Stadium for a Week 11 interconference showdown with the Houston Texans.

In the first quarter, New Orleans got the early lead as kicker Olindo Mare managed to get a 52-yard field goal. However, the Texans took the lead with QB Matt Schaub completing a 73-yard TD pass to WR Andre Johnson. In the second quarter, the Saints regained the lead with QB Drew Brees completing a 6-yard TD pass to WR Devery Henderson. However, Houston retook the lead with Schaub completing a 10-yard TD pass to TE Joel Dreessen.

After a scoreless third quarter, the Texans sealed the win as kicker Kris Brown nailed a 36-yarder, a 53-yarder, and a 23-yard field goal.

With the loss, New Orleans fell to 4–6. So far, all 6 of their losses came when they committed at least 2 turnovers in a game.

=== Week 12: at Carolina Panthers ===
Quarter	1	2	3	4	Total
Saints	0	10	21	0	31
Panthers	3	3	0	0	6

at Bank of America Stadium, Charlotte, North Carolina

- Game time: 1:03 PM EDT
- Game weather: 46 °F (8 °C) (Cloudy)
- Game attendance: 72,032
- Referee: Jerome Boger
- TV announcers (Fox): Dick Stockton (play-by-play) & Brian Baldinger (color commentator)

Trying to snap a two-game losing skid, the Saints flew to Bank of America Stadium for a Week 12 NFC South rematch against the Carolina Panthers with second place on the line.

In the first quarter, New Orleans trailed early as Panthers kicker John Kasay managed to get a 45-yard field goal for the only score of the period. In the second quarter, the Saints took the lead with QB Drew Brees completing a 1-yard TD pass to TE Lance Moore, along with kicker Olindo Mare kicking a 46-yard field goal. Carolina ended the half as Kasay nailing a 29-yard field goal.

In the third quarter, New Orleans ran away with the game as Brees completed a 1-yard TD pass to WR Billy Miller, got an 8-yard TD run, and completed a 4-yard TD pass to WR Marques Colston.

With the win, the Saints improved to 5–6.

For Marques Colston, this marked his fifth-straight game of having at least 65 reception yards in one game.

=== Week 13: vs. Tampa Bay Buccaneers ===
Quarter	1	2	3	4	Total
Buccaneers	3	10	7	7	27
Saints	7	7	7	2	23

at Louisiana Superdome, at New Orleans, Louisiana

- Game time: 4:15 PM EDT
- Game weather: Game Played Indoors (Domed Stadium)
- Game attendance: 70,009
- Referee: Ron Winter
- TV announcers (Fox): Sam Rosen (play-by-play) & Tim Ryan (color commentator)

Coming off their divisional road win over the Panthers, the Saints went home for a Week 13 NFC South rematch with the Tampa Bay Buccaneers. In the first quarter, New Orleans trailed early with Buccaneers kicker Matt Bryant getting a 27-yard field goal. Afterwards, the Saints took the lead with QB Drew Brees completing a 4-yard TD pass to WR Terrance Copper. In the second quarter, Tampa Bay regained the lead with QB Luke McCown completing a 1-yard TD pass to TE Anthony Becht, along with Bryant nailing a 31-yard field goal. Afterwards, New Orleans retook the lead with Brees completing a 45-yard TD pass to WR Devery Henderson.

In the third quarter, the Buccaneers regained the lead with RB Earnest Graham getting a 25-yard TD run. Later, the Saints retook the lead with CB Mike McKenzie returning an interception 53 yards for a touchdown. In the fourth quarter, New Orleans increased its lead with DE Will Smith taking McCown down in the endzone for a safety. However, an attempted double reverse resulted in a lost fumble. It allowed Tampa Bay to get into position for the win, as McCown completed a 4-yard TD pass to TE Jerramy Stevens.

With the loss, the Saints fell to 5–7.

=== Week 14: at Atlanta Falcons ===
Quarter	1	2	3	4	Total
Saints	7	10	14	3	34
Falcons	7	0	0	7	14

at Georgia Dome, Atlanta

- Game time: 8:30 p.m. EDT/7:30 p.m. CDT
- Game weather: Game Played Indoors (Domed Stadium)
- Game attendance: 69,553
- Referee: Gene Steratore
- TV announcers (ESPN): Mike Tirico (play-by-play), Ron Jaworski, Tony Kornheiser (color commentators), Michele Tafoya, & Suzy Kolber (sideline reporters)

Hoping to rebound from their divisional home loss to the Buccaneers, the Saints flew to the Georgia Dome for a Week 14 Monday Night NFC South rematch with the Atlanta Falcons. In the first quarter, New Orleans drew first blood as QB Drew Brees completed a 25-yard TD pass to WR David Patten. The Falcons responded with QB Chris Redman completing a 33-yard TD pass to WR Roddy White. In the second quarter, the Saints started to pull away as kicker Olindo Mare managed to get a 23-yard field goal, while Brees completed a 15-yard TD pass to WR Marques Colston.

In the third quarter, New Orleans pulled away as Brees hooked up with Colston again on a 2-yard TD pass, while Safety Roman Harper returned an interception 31 yards for a touchdown. In the fourth quarter, Atlanta got their last strike of the game as Redman completed a 13-yard TD pass to WR Michael Jenkins. The Saints wrapped up their victory with Mare nailing a 36-yard field goal.

With their second-straight season-sweeping win over the Falcons, New Orleans improved to 6–7.

=== Week 15: vs. Arizona Cardinals ===
Quarter	1	2	3	4	Total
Cardinals	7	7	7	3	24
Saints	7	14	10	0	31

at Louisiana Superdome, New Orleans, Louisiana

- Game time: 1:00 PM EDT/10:00 AM PDT
- Game weather: Game Played Indoors (Domed Stadium)
- Game attendance: 70,007
- Referee: Ed Hochuli
- TV announcers (Fox): Ron Pitts (play-by-play) & Tony Boselli (color commentator)

Coming off their Monday night divisional road win over the Falcons, the Saints went home for a Week 15 intraconference duel with the Arizona Cardinals. In the first quarter, New Orleans trialed early as Cardinals QB Kurt Warner completed a 1-yard TD pass to TE Troy Bienemann. The Saints responded with QB Drew Brees completing a 19-yard TD pass to WR Marques Colston. In the second quarter, New Orleans took the lead with RB Aaron Stecker getting a 1-yard TD run. Arizona tied the game with Warner completing an 18-yard TD pass to WR Larry Fitzgerald, yet the Saints regained the lead prior to halftime with Brees completing a 32-yard TD pass to WR David Patten.

In the third quarter, New Orleans increased its lead with Stecker getting a 6-yard TD run. The Cardinals responded with Warner completing a 3-yard TD pass to TE Ben Patrick. The Saints replied with kicker Martín Gramática getting a 31-yard field goal. In the fourth quarter, Arizona tried to rally as kicker Neil Rackers nailed a 26-yard field goal. New Orleans' defense held on for the victory.

With the win, the Saints improved to 7–7. At this point, Drew Brees had thrown 10 touchdowns and only 1 interception over the past four games.

=== Week 16: vs. Philadelphia Eagles ===
Quarter	1	2	3	4	Total
Eagles	21	3	7	7	38
Saints	14	3	0	6	23

at Louisiana Superdome, New Orleans, Louisiana

- Game time: 1:00 PM EDT/10:00 AM PDT
- Game weather: Game Played Indoors (Domed Stadium)
- TV announcers (Fox): Sam Rosen (play-by-play) & Tim Ryan (color commentator)

Coming off the win against the Cardinals. The Saints stayed home for a Week 16 matchup against the Eagles, who they beat at home twice in the previous season, including in the playoffs. In the first quarter, the Eagles scored first as Kevin Curtis recovered a McNabb (38-yard run) fumble in the end zone putting Philly up 7–0, while the Saints responded with RB Aaron Stecker scoring 2 TD's (3-yard run & 1-yard run) to put the Saints up 14–7. The lead did not last long, as Eagles RB Correll Buckhalter scored a 20 yard TD run, following the Eagles' next possession as McNabb completed a 30-yard TD pass to Reggie Brown as the Eagles went up 21–14 after both Gramatica and Akers traded field goals apiece in the 2nd quarter.

In the third quarter, the Eagles took advantage of the goal line stand and capped a 99-yard touchdown drive with McNabb completing a 9-yard touchdown pass to Greg Lewis. In the 4th quarter, the Saints tried to rally back with M. Gramatica kicking 35- and 26-yard field goals. The Eagles sealed the game with Kevin Curtis hauling in a 9-yard touchdown catch, allowing them to get the Saints back for the previous season.

With the loss, the Saints fell to 7–8 but barely kept their playoff hopes alive when the Washington Redskins defeated the Minnesota Vikings 32–21 Sunday night.

=== Week 17: at Chicago Bears ===
Quarter	1	2	3	4	Total
Saints	0	17	0	8	25
Bears	10	14	7	2	33

at Soldier Field, Chicago

- Game time: 1:00 PM EDT/10:00 AM PDT
- Referee: Bill Leavy
- TV announcers (Fox): Dick Stockton and Brian Baldinger

Coming off that home loss against the Eagles, the Saints in Week 17 travel to Soldier Field for a NFC Championship rematch from 2006 Conference against the Bears. New Orleans coming in this game needing a win and both losses by the Redskins & Vikings to clinch the final playoff spot in the NFC Playoff race. New Orleans trails right away in the 1st quarter as Bears K Robbie Gould connecting a 39-yard field goal, along with Kyle Orton completing a 19-yard pass to Mark Bradley for a 10–0 lead. As the Saints managed to get on the board in the second quarter with Drew Brees completing a 3-yard Touchdown pass to Marques Colston. The Bears continue to roll with Orton hooking a 9-yard TD to Bernard Berrian. New Orleans responds with Drew Brees connecting to M. Colston for a 21-yard touchdown reception. Both the Bears & Saints then closed out the first half with Orton completing a 55-yard TD pass to D. Hester, Along with Saints K Martin Gramatica kicks a 48-yard Field Goal.

In the third quarter the Saints continue to fall behind with Devin Hester returning a 64-yard punt for a touchdown. Then the Bears in the 4th quarter add on more points recording a Safety due to Jahri Evans being penalized in the end zone. While Drew Brees managed to hooked up to Pierre Thomas for an 11-yard touchdown strike (along with the 2 pt conversion). Afterwards the Saints failed to recover the onside kick allowing Chicago to preserve the win.

With the loss, the Saints fell to 7–9 and were eliminated from postseason contention.
