= Sean Ryan (tight end) =

American football player (born 1980)

No. 80, 81, 88, 89
- Position: Tight end

Personal information
- Born: March 27, 1980 (age 46); Buffalo, New York, U.S.
- Listed height: 6 ft 5 in (1.96 m)
- Listed weight: 260 lb (118 kg)

Career information
- High school: St. Joseph's Collegiate Institute (Tonawanda, New York)
- College: Boston College
- NFL draft: 2004: 5th round, 144th overall pick

Career history
- Dallas Cowboys (2004–2005); New York Jets (2006–2007); Miami Dolphins (2008); New Orleans Saints (2008); San Francisco 49ers (2008); Kansas City Chiefs (2009); Washington Redskins (2010)*; Tennessee Titans (2010)*
- * Offseason or practice squad member only

Awards and highlights
- All-Big East (2003); Second-team All-Big East (2002)

Career NFL statistics
- Receptions: 26
- Receiving yards: 240
- Receiving touchdowns: 2
- Stats at Pro Football Reference

Sean P. Ryan (born March 27, 1980) is an American former professional football player who was a tight end in the National Football League (NFL) for the Dallas Cowboys, New York Jets, Miami Dolphins, New Orleans Saints, San Francisco 49ers and Kansas City Chiefs. He played college football for the Boston College Eagles and was selected by the Dallas Cowboys in the fifth round of the 2004 NFL draft.

== Early life ==
Ryan attended St. Joseph's Collegiate Institute, where he played defensive end. He was a three-time all-league and all-city selection. He was named to the All-state team as a senior. He also practiced basketball and lacrosse. After his senior season he enrolled at Worcester Academy to improve his academic grades.

He accepted a football scholarship from Boston College. As a redshirt freshman. He appeared in 11 games, with 7 starts including the Aloha Bowl at defensive end, posting 29 tackles (3 for loss) and one sack.

As a sophomore, he was converted into a tight end and became a regular starter, registering 17 receptions (fifth on the team), 223 yards and 3 touchdowns. As a junior, he tallied 23 receptions, 280 yards, 3 touchdowns and 10 special teams tackles (led the team). He was called the "most competitive player in the Big East" by USA Today, excelling in blocking and receiving second-team All-Big East honors.

As a senior, he registered 35 receptions (second on the team), 447 yards, 6 touchdowns and 9 special teams tackles. His 35 catches were the most by an Eagle tight end since Pete Mitchell had 55 in 1994. He also received the Orie T. Scarminach award, annually given to the MVP of the Boston College-Syracuse game, posting 6 receptions for 105 yards and one touchdown, while helping pave the way for running back Derrick Knight to rush for 170 yards and 2 touchdowns.

He finished his career with 50 games (44 starts), 75 receptions for 950 yards, 12 touchdowns (second in school history for tight ends) and 19 special teams tackles.

== Professional career ==
Pre-draft measurables
Height	Weight	Arm length	Hand span	Vertical jump	Broad jump	Bench press
6 ft 4 1/2 in (1.94 m)	268 lb (122 kg)	33 in (0.84 m)	10 3/8 in (0.26 m)	32.5 in (0.83 m)	9 ft 7 in (2.92 m)	22 reps
All values from NFL Combine

=== Dallas Cowboys ===
Ryan was selected by the Dallas Cowboys in the 5th round (144th overall) of the 2004 NFL draft. On September 6, he was waived and signed to the practice squad two days later. On November 24, with starter Dan Campbell on injured reserve, he was promoted to the active roster and appeared in 6 games as the blocking tight end.

He fractured his foot in training camp and missed all of the 2005 preseason. On September 3 he was released, but was still signed to the practice squad. On November 23, after third-string tight end Brett Pierce suffered a season ending injury, Ryan was promoted to the active roster.

On August 31, 2006, he was traded to the New York Jets in exchange for a seventh-round draft choice (#212-Courtney Brown).

=== New York Jets ===
In 2006, Ryan was expected to fill the role of backup tight end for the Jets, behind Chris Baker. He had 3 starts and 6 catches for a combined 44 yards. The next year, he played in 10 games (one start, 6 games inactive) and registered 3 receptions for 46 yards and an 18-yard kickoff return.

=== Miami Dolphins ===
On February 29, 2008, he signed a one-year contract as an unrestricted free agent with the Miami Dolphins, reuniting with former Dallas Cowboys head coach Bill Parcells. He played in one game before being released on September 12.

=== New Orleans Saints ===
On September 24, 2008, Ryan was signed by the New Orleans Saints after starting tight end Jeremy Shockey suffered a sports hernia. He was waived prior to their next game on September 28 in order to activate fullback Olaniyi Sobomehin from the practice squad. He was re-signed on October 8 after the team waived tight end Buck Ortega. He was released on October 16.

=== San Francisco 49ers ===
On November 3, 2008, the San Francisco 49ers signed him after releasing fullback David Kirtman. He wasn't re-signed at the end of the season.

=== Kansas City Chiefs ===
Ryan signed a one-year contract with the Kansas City Chiefs on April 21, 2009. He scored his first career touchdown in the season opener against the Baltimore Ravens. After appearing in 10 games (8 starts), he finished with career-highs in receptions (14 for 135 yards) and touchdowns (2). He wasn't re-signed at the end of the season.

=== Washington Redskins ===
On March 11, 2010, he signed as an unrestricted free agent with the Washington Redskins. He was waived on June 9.

=== Tennessee Titans ===
Ryan signed a one-year contract with the Tennessee Titans on July 14, 2010. He was released on September 4.

== Personal life ==
In December 2011, Ryan announced that he and a group of 11 other professional players had filed a lawsuit against the NFL. Ryan and his attorneys allege that the League failed to properly treat head injuries in spite of prevailing medical evidence, leading the players to develop effects of brain injury ranging from chronic headaches to depression.
