= Jason David =

American football player (born 1982)

No. 42
- Position: Cornerback

Personal information
- Born: June 12, 1982 (age 44); Edmonton, Alberta, Canada
- Listed height: 5 ft 8 in (1.73 m)
- Listed weight: 180 lb (82 kg)

Career information
- High school: Charter Oak (Covina, California, U.S.)
- College: Washington State
- NFL draft: 2004: 4th round, 125th overall pick

Career history
- Indianapolis Colts (2004–2006); New Orleans Saints (2007–2008); Detroit Lions (2009)

Awards and highlights
- Super Bowl champion (XLI); First-team All-Pac-10 (2003)

Career NFL statistics
- Total tackles: 225
- Forced fumbles: 2
- Fumble recoveries: 5
- Pass deflections: 55
- Interceptions: 16
- Defensive touchdowns: 2
- Stats at Pro Football Reference

Jason Aeron Walter David (born June 12, 1982) is a Canadian-born former professional American football cornerback in the National Football League (NFL). He was selected by the Indianapolis Colts in the fourth round of the 2004 NFL draft. Later, he won Super Bowl XLI with the Colts. He played college football at Washington State.

David also played for the New Orleans Saints and Detroit Lions.

== College career ==
David grew up in Covina, California and attended Charter Oak High School before attending Washington State University on a football scholarship and majoring in communications. Jason went on to be a three-year letterman at Washington State. He was teammates with fellow cornerback Marcus Trufant and wide receiver Devard Darling.

== Professional career ==
=== Indianapolis Colts ===
David was a fourth-round draft pick by the Indianapolis Colts in 2004. In 2004, he had 52 total tackles, 4 interceptions, and one forced fumble. He also won a Super Bowl with the Colts in 2006 as a starter.

=== New Orleans Saints ===
On April 18, 2007, David signed a 4-year offer sheet with the New Orleans Saints that the Colts had 7 days to match. Indianapolis declined to match New Orleans' offer, and was awarded the Saints' 4th-round draft pick as compensation.

He was waived on August 17, 2009.

=== Detroit Lions ===
David was signed by the Detroit Lions on November 3, 2009. He was waived on November 9, 2009.

== NFL career statistics ==
Legend
**Bold**	Career high

=== Regular season ===
Year	Team	Games		Tackles					Interceptions					Fumbles			
Year	Team	GP	GS	Cmb	Solo	Ast	Sck	TFL	Int	Yds	TD	Lng	PD	FF	FR	Yds	TD
2004	IND	16	11	52	**48**	4	0.0	**2**	4	36	**1**	34	**15**	**1**	0	0	0
2005	IND	16	16	44	32	**12**	0.0	0	2	13	0	13	10	0	**2**	5	0
2006	IND	16	16	**55**	**48**	7	0.0	1	2	16	0	16	9	0	1	5	0
2007	NOR	13	12	51	47	4	0.0	0	3	21	0	19	11	**1**	1	**55**	**1**
2008	NOR	14	6	23	21	2	0.0	1	**5**	**83**	0	**42**	10	0	1	17	0
		75	61	225	196	29	0.0	4	16	169	1	42	55	2	5	82	1

=== Playoffs ===
Year	Team	Games		Tackles					Interceptions					Fumbles			
Year	Team	GP	GS	Cmb	Solo	Ast	Sck	TFL	Int	Yds	TD	Lng	PD	FF	FR	Yds	TD
2004	IND	2	2	6	3	**3**	0.0	0	0	0	0	0	**4**	0	0	0	0
2005	IND	1	1	1	1	0	0.0	0	0	0	0	0	0	0	0	0	0
2006	IND	4	3	**7**	**5**	2	0.0	0	0	0	0	0	2	0	0	0	0
		7	6	14	9	5	0.0	0	0	0	0	0	6	0	0	0	0
