= Travis Fisher =

American football player and coach (born 1979)

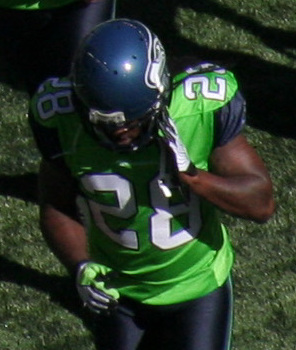
- Fisher with the Seattle Seahawks in 2009

UCF Knights
- Title: Senior defensive analyst

Personal information
- Born: September 12, 1979 (age 47); Tallahassee, Florida, U.S.
- Listed height: 5 ft 10 in (1.78 m)
- Listed weight: 194 lb (88 kg)

Career information
- High school: Godby (Tallahassee)
- College: UCF
- NFL draft: 2002: 2nd round, 64th overall pick

Career history

Playing
- St. Louis Rams (2002–2006); Detroit Lions (2007–2008); Seattle Seahawks (2009); Baltimore Ravens (2010)*
- * Offseason or practice squad member only

Coaching
- UCF (2013–2014) Defensive quality assistant; Southeast Missouri State (2014–2015) Cornerbacks coach; UCF (2015–2016) Cornerbacks coach; UCF (2016–2017) Defensive backs coach; Nebraska (2018–2022) Defensive backs coach; Syracuse (2023) Cornerbacks coach; UCF (2025–present) Senior defensive analyst

Career NFL statistics
- Total tackles: 343
- Forced fumbles: 2
- Fumble recoveries: 3
- Pass deflections: 39
- Interceptions: 9
- Defensive touchdowns: 2
- Stats at Pro Football Reference

Travis Lamon Fisher (born September 12, 1979) is an American former professional football player who was a cornerback and current coach for UCF. He played college football for the UCF Knights and was selected by the St. Louis Rams in the second round of the 2002 NFL draft.

Fisher also played for the Detroit Lions and Seattle Seahawks.

== Early life ==
Fisher attended Godby High School in Tallahassee, Florida and won varsity letters in football and track. In track, he won state championships on the 100 meter dash, the 200 meter dash, and was a member of the 4×100 meter relay, which placed first at the state championship.

== College career ==
At UCF, Fisher started 23-of-33 games and registered 130 tackles (91 solo) with four interceptions and 35 pass defenses. As a senior, he started 11 games and finished season with 61 tackles, (39 solo), two interceptions, 13 passes defensed, and three tackles for losses. The prior season, as a junior, started 11 games and finished season with 37 tackles (27 solo), had 11 passes defensed, and two interceptions. As a sophomore, he played in 11 games with onestart and ended year with 32 tackles and tied for team lead with 11 passes defensed. Fisher played one season at Coffeyville Community College (Kan.), where he led team to number four national ranking in pass defense. He redshirted as a true freshman.

== Playing career ==
=== Pre-draft ===
Fisher was timed at pre-draft workouts as having a 4.37 40-yard time, a vertical jump of 34 1/2 in (880 mm), measured height of 5 ft 9 7/8 in (1.775 m), and weight of 188 lb (85 kg).

=== St. Louis Rams ===
He was selected in the second round by the St. Louis Rams with the 64th overall pick of the 2002 NFL draft. He signed a five-year, $3 million contract with the Rams. The contract called for a $1.15 million signing bonus. In his rookie season he played in 14 games and started 11, and recorded 67 tackles, 2 interceptions, and 14 passes defended. 2003 was his best year as he played in 15 games and recorded 75 tackles, 4 interceptions, and 12 passes defended. He returned two of his four interceptions for touchdowns (57, 74) and also tied for the NFL lead with 205 total interception return yards. In 2004, he sustained a broken right arm in preseason game at forcing him to miss the first six games of the season. He returned to play and start in 10 games and finished season with 42 tackles (35 solo), an interception, a forced fumble and six pass defenses. In 2005, he was the starting right cornerback for eight of the first nine games. Missed five of six games before being placed on reserve/injured list December 14, 2005, with groin injury. In 2006 Fisher played and started in nine games for the Rams and registered 31 tackles (25 solo) and two pass defenses. He left the Week 10 game at Seattle (11/12) in fourth quarter with fractured right arm and was placed on reserve/injured list November 14, 2006. This was the second time in the previous three seasons he broke his arm.

=== Detroit Lions ===
He signed a one-year $2.25 million deal with the Lions March 13, 2007, as an unrestricted free agent. Fisher re-signed a three-year $9 million contract (with $4 million in guarantees) with the Lions on March 12, 2008, after recording a career-high 85 tackles during his first year with Detroit in which started 13 of the 16 games he played. In 2008, he had 39 tackles, two passes defensed after starting 8 of the 15 games he played. On May 1, 2009, the Lions released Fisher.

=== Seattle Seahawks ===
Fisher signed with the Seattle Seahawks on August 2, 2009. He was waived on November 2.

=== Baltimore Ravens ===
Fisher signed with the Baltimore Ravens on May 17, 2010. He was released on September 4.

== NFL career statistics ==
Legend
	Led the league
**Bold**	Career high

=== Regular season ===
Year	Team	Games		Tackles					Interceptions					Fumbles			
Year	Team	GP	GS	Cmb	Solo	Ast	Sck	TFL	Int	Yds	TD	Lng	PD	FF	FR	Yds	TD
2002	STL	14	11	61	54	7	0.0	0	2	0	0	0	9	**1**	**1**	0	0
2003	STL	15	**15**	61	56	5	0.0	0	**4**	**205**	**2**	**74**	**11**	0	**1**	0	0
2004	STL	10	10	35	32	3	0.0	0	1	30	0	30	5	**1**	0	0	0
2005	STL	8	8	37	37	0	0.0	0	0	0	0	0	3	0	**1**	0	0
2006	STL	9	9	30	29	1	0.0	0	0	0	0	0	1	0	0	0	0
2007	DET	**16**	13	**77**	**59**	**18**	0.0	**3**	2	25	0	13	5	0	0	0	0
2008	DET	14	8	37	30	7	0.0	0	0	0	0	0	5	0	0	0	0
2009	SEA	4	0	5	4	1	0.0	0	0	0	0	0	0	0	0	0	0
		90	74	343	301	42	0.0	3	9	260	2	74	39	2	3	0	0

=== Playoffs ===
Year	Team	Games		Tackles					Interceptions					Fumbles			
Year	Team	GP	GS	Cmb	Solo	Ast	Sck	TFL	Int	Yds	TD	Lng	PD	FF	FR	Yds	TD
2003	STL	1	1	9	8	**1**	0.0	**2**	0	0	0	0	0	0	0	0	0
2004	STL	**2**	**2**	**12**	**12**	0	0.0	0	**1**	0	0	0	**1**	**1**	0	0	0
		3	3	21	20	1	0.0	2	1	0	0	0	1	1	0	0	0

== Coaching career ==
Fisher has been a college assistant coach for nearly a decade, ranging from quality control assistant to defensive backs coach. He began his coaching career at UCF under Scott Frost.

Fisher was the defensive backs coach at Nebraska from 2018 to 2022 and at UCF from 2015 to 2017. Under Fisher's coaching, nine of his defensive backs from 2018 to 2022 have signed NFL contracts, including junior college transfer Mike Hughes, who became an All-American and first-round NFL pick in one season.

In January 2023, Fisher was hired by the Syracuse Orange football team as defensive backs coach.
