= Mike McKenzie (American football) =

American football player (born 1976)

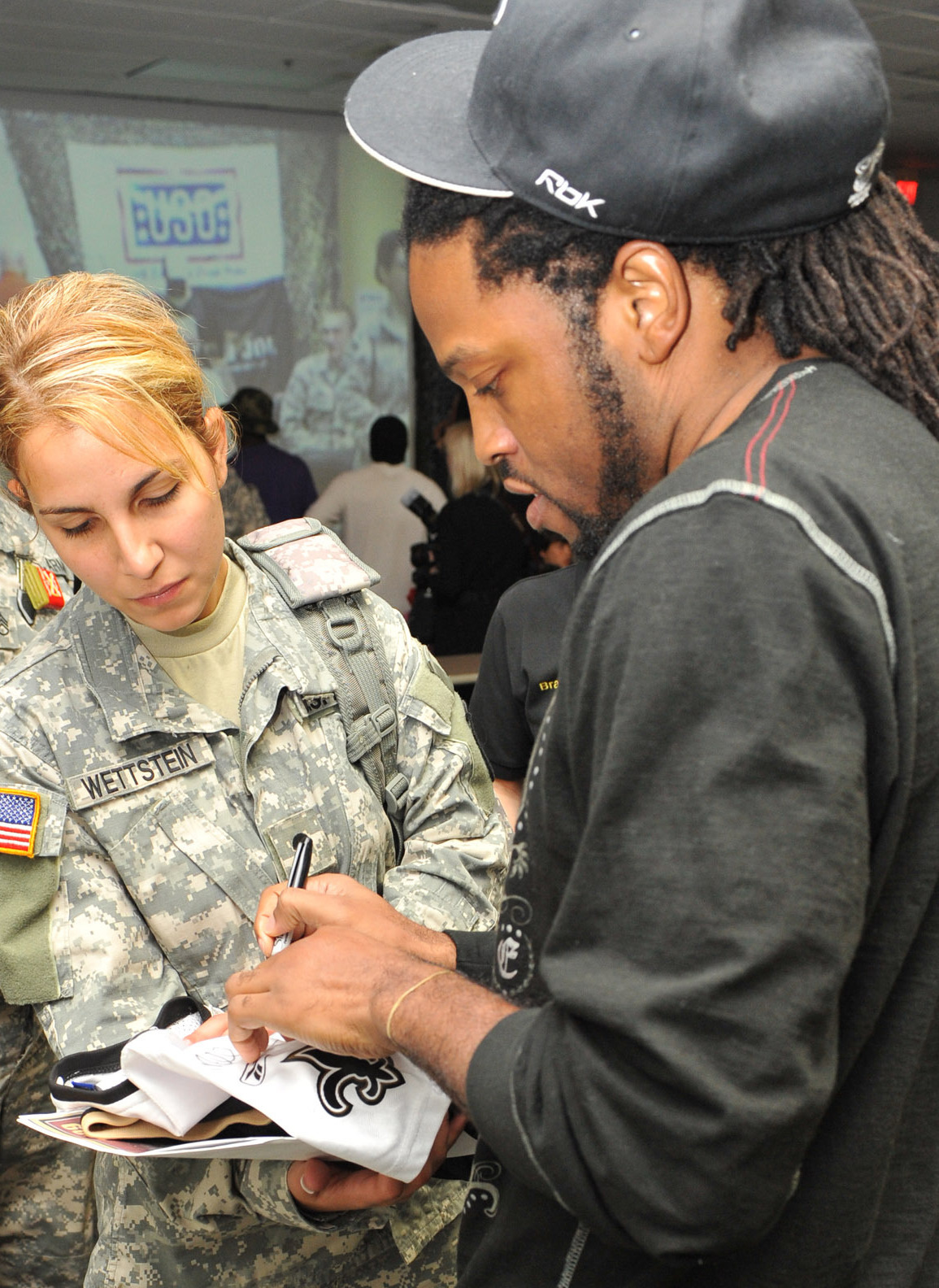
- McKenzie (right) in 2009

No. 34, 43
- Position: Cornerback

Personal information
- Born: April 26, 1976 (age 50); Miami, Florida, U.S.
- Listed height: 6 ft 0 in (1.83 m)
- Listed weight: 194 lb (88 kg)

Career information
- High school: Miami Norland (Miami Gardens, Florida)
- College: Memphis
- NFL draft: 1999: 3rd round, 87th overall pick

Career history
- Green Bay Packers (1999–2004); New Orleans Saints (2004–2009)

Awards and highlights
- Super Bowl champion (XLIV)

Career NFL statistics
- Total tackles: 487
- Forced fumbles: 2
- Fumble recoveries: 1
- Pass deflections: 122
- Interceptions: 28
- Defensive touchdowns: 4
- Stats at Pro Football Reference

Michael Terrance McKenzie (born April 26, 1976) is an American former professional football player who was a cornerback in the National Football League (NFL). He played college football for the Memphis Tigers. He was selected by the Green Bay Packers in the third round of the 1999 NFL draft. He also played for the New Orleans Saints.

== Early life ==
McKenzie graduated from Miami Norland High School in Miami Gardens, Florida, and was an all-Dade county selection at free safety as a senior.

== College career ==
McKenzie was a three-year letterman at the University of Memphis, and majored in business management. He played in 32 consecutive games for the Tigers, with 26 straight starts. McKenzie was named First-team All-Conference USA as a sophomore and junior, and finished his career with 234 tackles, six interceptions, and two fumble recoveries.

== Professional career ==
=== Green Bay Packers ===
McKenzie was drafted by the Packers in the third round of the 1999 NFL draft and immediately made the starting lineup. In 2002 McKenzie signed a 5-year, $17.1 million extension with the Packers. Following a contract holdout that lasted until mid-September, on October 4, 2004, he was traded along with a future draft choice to the New Orleans Saints in exchange for third string Quarterback J. T. O'Sullivan and a second round draft pick. He spent five full seasons with the Packers.

=== New Orleans Saints ===
Immediately following the trade, McKenzie became the Saints' starting right cornerback for the final 10 games of the 2004 NFL season. He led the club in interceptions from 2004 to 2008 with 12.

McKenzie was placed on injured reserve for the final game of 2007 after tearing his ACL the week before. McKenzie came back from the injury to start in 6 games in 2008, but once again suffered a major knee injury in early November. He was again placed on injured reserve, this time with a fractured right kneecap.

McKenzie was released by the Saints on March 19, 2009. He tried out with the Seattle Seahawks and Houston Texans during summer 2009 but did not sign. When the Saints, in the midst of their most successful season in team history, suffered a rash of injuries and were left with almost no healthy cornerbacks on the roster, the team re-signed McKenzie on November 23, 2009, after he had called head coach Sean Payton to ask for his job back. In his first game in more than a year, a highly anticipated, nationally televised match with New England, McKenzie intercepted an early pass by the Patriots' Tom Brady, and went on to play a key role in the team's dominant win.

Ultimately, McKenzie appeared in five games (two starts) for the Saints in 2009, recording 11 tackles and an interception. When the team's starting cornerbacks had recovered from their injuries, McKenzie was waived prior to the regular season finale on January 2, 2010, allowing the team to promote quarterback Chase Daniel to the active roster. Although McKenzie was no longer on the roster when the Saints won Super Bowl XLIV, the team awarded him with a Super Bowl ring in recognition of his contributions.

== Personal ==
McKenzie currently owns a home in New Orleans, Louisiana and splits his offseason residence between Miami, Florida and Memphis, Tennessee. McKenzie established a non-profit organization, the 34 Ways Foundation to help underprivileged youth. The Foundation serves various regions including Miami, Florida, New Orleans, Louisiana, Memphis, Tennessee, and Los Angeles, California. He was awarded the 2007 New Orleans Saints Man of the Year Award for this work. McKenzie has also established a winemaking business specializing in a wine made from orange moscato grapes. McKenzie was the first Packers player to wear dreadlocks.
