= DeMario Pressley =

American football player (born 1985)

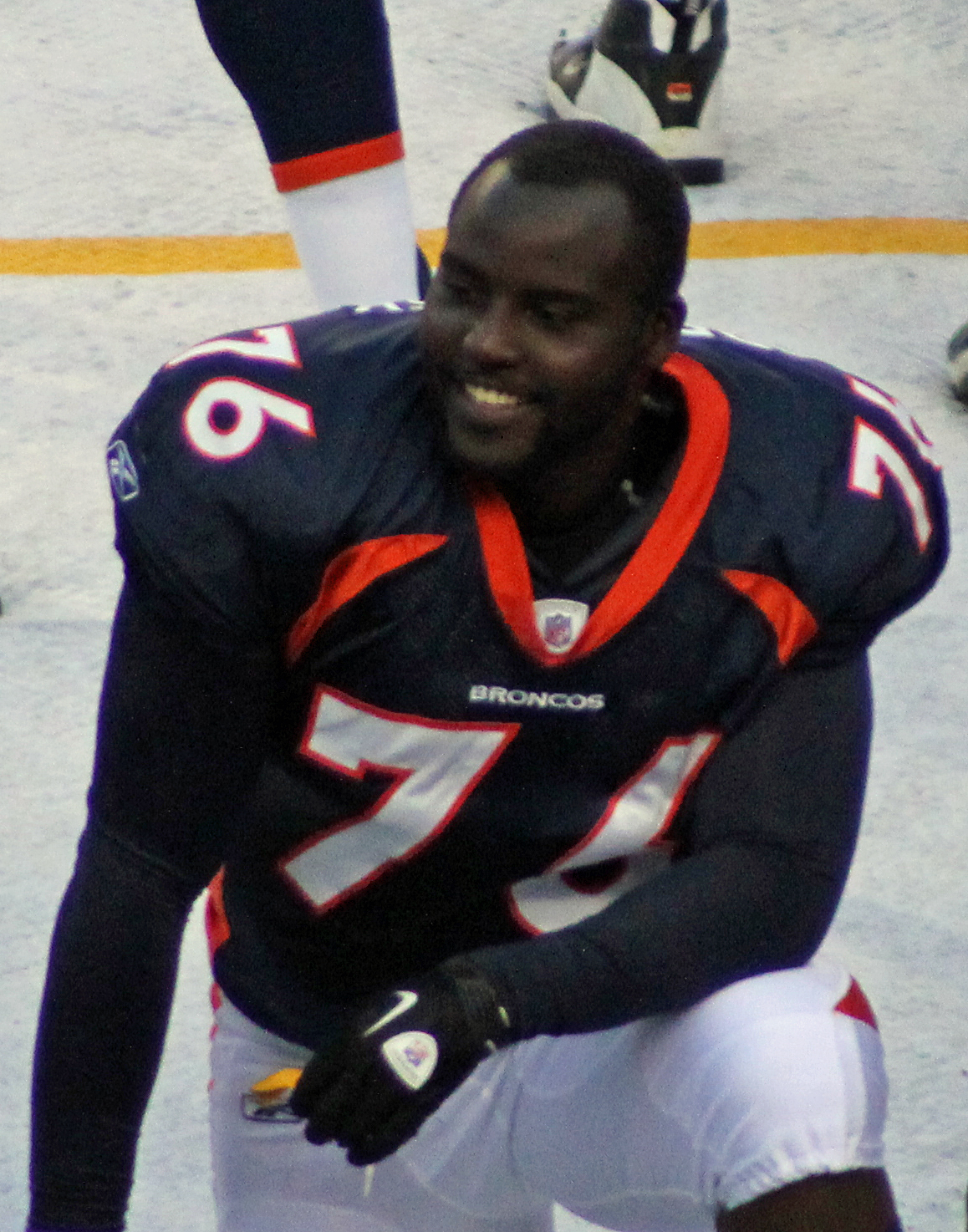
- Pressley with the Denver Broncos in 2011

No. 90, 61, 95
- Position: Defensive tackle

Personal information
- Born: November 3, 1985 (age 41); Greensboro, North Carolina, U.S.
- Listed height: 6 ft 3 in (1.91 m)
- Listed weight: 301 lb (137 kg)

Career information
- High school: James B. Dudley (Greensboro)
- College: North Carolina State
- NFL draft: 2008: 5th round, 144th overall pick

Career history
- New Orleans Saints (2008–2010); Houston Texans (2010); Indianapolis Colts (2011)*; Denver Broncos (2011)*; Omaha Nighthawks (2011); Carolina Panthers (2011); Chicago Bears (2012)
- * Offseason or practice squad member only

Awards and highlights
- Super Bowl champion (XLIV)

Career NFL statistics
- Total tackles: 20
- Pass deflections: 1
- Stats at Pro Football Reference

DeMario Pressley (born November 3, 1985) is an American former professional football player who was a defensive tackle in the National Football League (NFL). He played college football for the NC State Wolfpack and was selected by the New Orleans Saints in the fifth round of the 2008 NFL draft with the 144th overall pick.

Pressley was also a member of the Houston Texans, Indianapolis Colts, Denver Broncos, Carolina Panthers, and Chicago Bears.

== Professional career ==
On February 22, 2011, Pressley was acquired by the Colts after being waived by Houston, but was waived on August 16. He was claimed by Denver the next day but later released. Pressley was promoted to the active roster of the Carolina Panthers on December 30, 2011, played in the final game of the season, then was waived on March 16, 2012.

On April 11, 2012, Pressley signed with the Bears.

On August 21, 2012, Pressley was waived/injured by the Bears, and subsequently reverted to injured reserve on August 22.
