= Scott Tercero =

American football player (born 1981)

No. 63
- Position: Guard

Personal information
- Born: October 28, 1981 (age 45); Whittier, California, U.S.
- Listed height: 6 ft 4 in (1.93 m)
- Listed weight: 303 lb (137 kg)

Career information
- High school: Loyola (Los Angeles, California)
- College: California
- NFL draft: 2003: 6th round, 184th overall pick

Career history
- St. Louis Rams (2003–2004)

Awards and highlights
- Second-team All-Pac-10 (2002)

Career NFL statistics
- Games played: 8
- Games started: 4
- Stats at Pro Football Reference

Scott Eliott Tercero (born October 28, 1981) is an American former professional football player who was a guard in the National Football League (NFL). He was selected by the St. Louis Rams in the sixth round of the 2003 NFL draft. He played college football for the California Golden Bears.

== Early life ==
Tercero played high school football at Loyola High School in Los Angeles, California. He earned second-team all state honors his senior year.

== College career ==
Tercero played college football for the California Golden Bears at the University of California, Berkeley, from 1999 to 2002. He garnered Sporting News third-team Freshman All-America recognition in 1999. He started all 11 games at right guard in 2001, earning honorable mention All-Pac-10 honors and winning the team's Brick Muller Award for best offensive lineman. Tercero was named second-team All-Pac-10 his senior season in 2002.

== Professional career ==
Pre-draft measurables
Height	Weight	40-yard dash	10-yard split	20-yard split	20-yard shuttle	Three-cone drill	Vertical jump	Broad jump	Bench press	Wonderlic
6 ft 3 7/8 in (1.93 m)	303 lb (137 kg)	5.23 s	1.77 s	3.01 s	4.51 s	7.81 s	40 1/2 in (1.03 m)	8 ft 7 in (2.62 m)	25 reps	31
All from NFL Combine.

Tercero was selected by the St. Louis Rams in the sixth round, with the 184th overall pick, of the 2003 NFL draft. He officially signed with the Rams on July 16, 2003. He was waived on August 28, 2003 and signed to the team's practice squad on September 2. He was promoted to the active roster on December 11, 2003.

Tercero played in eight games, starting four, for the Rams during the 2004 season, before being placed on injured reserve on November 16, 2004. He re-signed with the Rams on March 2, 2005. He was waived on July 27, 2005.
