= Mike Karney =

American football player (born 1981)

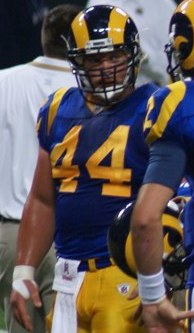
- Karney with the St. Louis Rams in 2009

No. 44
- Position: Fullback

Personal information
- Born: July 6, 1981 (age 45); San Jose, California, U.S.
- Listed height: 5 ft 11 in (1.80 m)
- Listed weight: 260 lb (118 kg)

Career information
- High school: Covington (WA) Kentwood
- College: Arizona State
- NFL draft: 2004: 5th round, 156th overall pick

Career history
- New Orleans Saints (2004–2008); St. Louis Rams (2009–2010)

Awards and highlights
- All-Pro (2006); All-Pac-10 (2001)

Career NFL statistics
- Rushing attempts: 47
- Rushing yards: 99
- Rushing touchdowns: 5
- Receptions: 64
- Receiving yards: 325
- Receiving touchdowns: 2
- Stats at Pro Football Reference

Michael John Mario Karney (born July 6, 1981) is an American former professional football player who was a fullback for seven seasons in the National Football League (NFL). He played college football for the Arizona State Sun Devils. He was selected by the New Orleans Saints in the fifth round of the 2004 NFL draft, and also played for the NFL's St. Louis Rams.

== Early life ==
Karney was born in San Jose, California. He was raised in Kent, Washington and attended Kentwood High School in Covington, Washington and garnered varsity letters in football and baseball. In football, he was a USA Today High School All-American selection, a PrepStar all-region honoree, named the No. 15 player in the Northwest. Karney rushed for 800 yards and 22 touchdowns as a senior as his team went to the Class 4A state title game, its first appearance in 10 years.

== College career ==
While attending Arizona State University, Karney played for the Sun Devils football team. He started 28 of 46 games for the Sun Devils and had 78 yards on 32 carries and 37 receptions for 308 yards and a touchdown. Karney is said to have trained in college by strapping his car to his back and attempt to pull it around. As a senior, he recorded 14 catches for 106 yards and in 2002, opened 11 of 14 games, posting 20 rushing yards on eight carries and hauling in 13 passes for 121 yards. All Pac-10 selection in 2001, opening seven games and playing in every contest. That season had six carries for 18 yards and caught six passes for 39 yards, including a seven-yard touchdown vs. San Diego State.

== Professional career ==
=== Pre-draft ===
Pre-draft measurables
Height	Weight	Arm length	Hand span	40-yard dash	10-yard split	20-yard split	Vertical jump	Broad jump	Bench press	Wonderlic
5 ft 11 3/8 in (1.81 m)	254 lb (115 kg)	29 1/4 in (0.74 m)	9 1/4 in (0.23 m)	5.05 s	1.76 s	2.91 s	30.0 in (0.76 m)	8 ft 7 in (2.62 m)	25 reps	
All values from NFL Combine

Karney was rated as one of the top fullbacks coming out of college.

=== New Orleans Saints ===
Karney was selected in the fifth round of the 2004 NFL draft by the New Orleans Saints with the 156th overall pick. Karney was signed to three-year $1.3 million contract on July 29, 2004, and proved to be a solid lead blocker and average receiver out of the backfield. The Saints gave up two picks to draft Karney. In his first two seasons he started 22 of 32 games. He was re-signed to a contract extension prior to the 2006 season (July 13, 2006). The extension was for a reported four-years and $5.6 million including incentives, and included a $1.2 million signing bonus. On December 10, 2006, against the Dallas Cowboys on Sunday Night Football, Karney had his best NFL game, scoring two receiving and one rushing touchdowns, his first three touchdowns in the NFL. After the 2006 season, Karney was voted All-pro.

=== St. Louis Rams ===
Karney signed a three-year, $4.9 million contract with the St. Louis Rams on March 11, 2009. The deal includes $1.7 million guaranteed. Karney was needed because, according to ESPN's John Clayton, "The Rams have been struggling at that position since they released Madison Hedgecock early in 2007." Hedgecock ended up starting for the New York Giants in Super Bowl XLII and was Second-team All-Pro . On the day of the Karney signing, Rams head coach Steve Spagnuolo said, "Mike has proven to be a solid fullback since entering the league in 2004. We are excited that he is now a Ram and we looking forward to him being an effective part of our offense in the future." Steven Jackson echoed that saying, "I've seen the holes that he's opened up...I'm looking forward to working with him."

On February 8, 2011, the Rams released Karney.

=== Seattle Seahawks ===
Karney visited with the Seahawks on August 30, 2011, but was not signed to a contract by Seattle.
