= Olaniyi Sobomehin =

American football player (born 1984)

No. 33
- Position: Fullback

Personal information
- Born: October 11, 1984 (age 42); Portland, Oregon, U.S.
- Listed height: 6 ft 1 in (1.85 m)
- Listed weight: 230 lb (104 kg)

Career information
- College: Portland State
- NFL draft: 2008: undrafted

Career history
- New Orleans Saints (2008–2009)

Awards and highlights
- Second-team All-Big Sky (2007)
- Stats at Pro Football Reference

Olaniyi "Nee" Sobomehin [OH-la-nee-yee Shuh-BO-muh-heen] (born October 11, 1984) is an American former football fullback. He played college football at Portland State. He was signed by the New Orleans Saints as an undrafted free agent in 2008. After getting injured, he spent his rookie season on Injured Reserve.

== Early life ==
Sobomehin was born in Portland, Oregon. He attended The Catlin Gabel School in Portland, where he lettered in basketball and track. Because his high school did not field a football team, he played for Cleveland High School in Portland.

== College career ==
Sobomehin played in 19 games with eight starts after transferring to Portland State. He was PSU's leading rusher as a senior, gaining 515 yards on 110 carries with eight TDs.
