= Buck Ortega =

American football player (born 1981)

No. 86
- Position: Tight end

Personal information
- Born: November 22, 1983 (age 42); Miami, Florida, U.S.
- Listed height: 6 ft 4 in (1.93 m)
- Listed weight: 250 lb (113 kg)

Career information
- High school: Gulliver Prep (Pinecrest, Florida)
- College: Miami (Fla.)
- NFL draft: 2006: undrafted

Career history
- Washington Redskins (2006)*; Cleveland Browns (2006–2007)*; Miami Dolphins (2007)*; New Orleans Saints (2007–2009)
- * Offseason or practice squad member only

Career NFL statistics
- Receptions: 1
- Receiving yards: 3
- Stats at Pro Football Reference

Buck Ortega (born November 22, 1981) is an American former professional football player who was a tight end in the National Football League (NFL). He played college football for the Miami Hurricanes and was signed by the Washington Redskins as an undrafted free agent in 2006.

Ortega was also a member of the Cleveland Browns, New Orleans Saints and Miami Dolphins.

== Personal life ==
Buck played college football at the University of Miami. At UM he played quarterback, tight end and special teams.

Buck played his high school football at Gulliver Prep in Miami, Florida. At Gulliver he played with deceased former NFL Star Sean Taylor. These two future NFL players led Gulliver to the 2000 2A State Football championship.

Following his time at the University of Miami, Buck played for the Washington Redskins, Cleveland Browns, and finally the New Orleans Saints.

His father, Ralph Ortega, played at the University of Florida, where he is enshrined among the hundred greatest players in that program's history as well as being selected to the hundred greatest player's in Florida High School football history after an impressive career at Coral Gables High School. Ralph was selected as the third pick in the second round of the 1975 NFL Draft by the Atlanta Falcons. He also played for the Miami Dolphins.

In 2024 and 2025, Buck was the outside linebacker coach for the Elmwood Raiders in Rogers, Arkansas, coaching his son, Bear Ortega, to follow in Buck's and Ralph's footsteps. In 2026, Buck followed his son into the Rogers High School Mountaineers football program where he now is an assistant coach, helping his son along the path that he himself took.
