= 2007 St. Louis Rams season =

NFL team season

- Owner: Georgia Frontiere
- Head coach: Scott Linehan
- Home stadium: Edward Jones Dome

Results
- Record: 3–13
- Division place: 4th NFC West
- Playoffs: Did not qualify
- Pro Bowlers: WR Torry Holt
- Team MVP: Will Witherspoon
- Team ROY: Adam Carriker

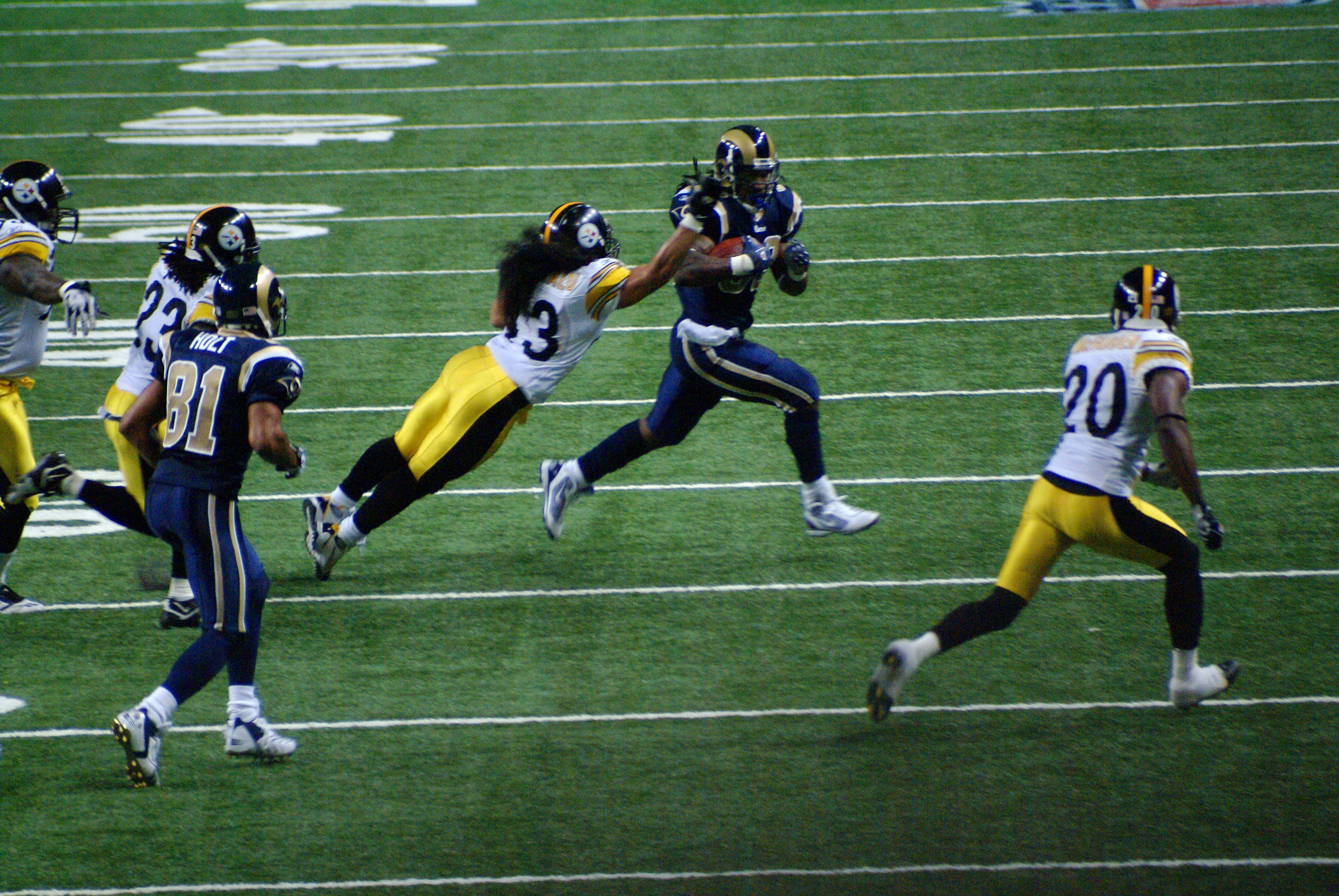
The Rams host the Pittsburgh Steelers in week 16 of 2007

The 2007 season was the St. Louis Rams' 70th in the National Football League (NFL) and their 13th in St. Louis. This would prove the fourth-worst season for the Rams during their time in St. Louis. The team looked to improve on an 8–8 record from 2006. However, the Rams slumped early, losing their first eight games of the season heading into their bye week. Following their bye, they would beat both New Orleans and San Francisco on the road before losing 5 of their last 6 games to conclude the season. The Rams 0–8 start to the season is the worst in franchise history and matched their 3rd ever longest losing streak. The Rams also went 1–7 at home in 2007, the worst in franchise history until it was broken by the 2009 team two years later. The Rams' defense was dismal and was the biggest scar on the team the entire season, as they allowed the second-most points in the league during the season with 438.

The 2007 season was the fourth of 13 consecutive seasons that the franchise did not have a winning season, a streak that was broken in 2017 when the Los Angeles Rams posted an 11–5 record.

== Offseason ==
Head coach Scott Linehan made several coaching changes. Al Roberts replaced Bob Ligashesky as the special teams coach. Mike Cox was given the position as the defensive quality control coach to replace Joe Baker who left to become the Denver Broncos' linebackers coach. Keith Murphy was named the offensive quality control coach to replace Randy Hanson who went to the Oakland Raiders. Murphy coached at the University of Washington with Linehan from 1996 to 1999.

On February 23, 2007, the Rams allocated five players to NFL Europa: Mike Brown and Josh Lay went to the Berlin Thunder; and Jeremy Parquet, Tim Sandidge, and John David Washington went to the Hamburg Sea Devils.

=== Free agency ===
On opening day of the free agency, the Rams traded a fifth round draft choice to the Detroit Lions for James Hall. On March 3, 2007, the Rams signed Drew Bennett to a six-year, $30 million deal. Unrestricted free agents Todd Steussie and Travis Minor re-signed with the Rams each for a one-year deal. The Rams acquired B.J. Sander in case the team lost Matt Turk. On March 8, 2007, the Rams signed Randy McMichael to a three-year contract and acquired Todd Johnson from the Chicago Bears who signed a four-year contract. On March 21, 2007, the Rams signed Randy McMichael to a three-year deal. On March 26, 2007, Marshall Faulk announced his retirement from the NFL.

On April 18, 2007, the Rams signed punter Donnie Jones to a five-year $5.59 million deal. The Rams also gave up a seventh round draft choice to the Miami Dolphins for Jones. Sander was released from the Rams two days later.

On April 30, 2007, a day after the NFL Draft, the Rams added nineteen undrafted free agents to their roster. The most notable addition was Iowa quarterback Drew Tate. The Rams brought four wide receivers: North Carolina State's Lamart Barrett, Wake Forest's Nate Morton, Hofstra's Shaine Smith and Texas State's Markee White. They added Boise State fullback Brad Lau, Nevada running back Robert Hubbard, University of Pittsburgh tight end Steve Buches, University of Washington guard Stanley Daniels, and Massachusetts guard David Thompson to the Rams' offense. They also added four defensive backs: Alabama free safety Jeffery Dukes, Kent State strong safety Andre Kirklan, Arkansas cornerback Darius Vinnett and Villanova cornerback Terrance Reaves. They added LSU defensive end Ryan Willis and Albany State defensive end Alton Pettway to the Rams' defense. The Rams added Cincinnati kicker Kevin Lovell.

=== NFL draft ===
Round	Pick	Player	Position	College
1	13	Adam Carriker	Defensive end	Nebraska
2	52	Brian Leonard	Fullback	Rutgers
3	84	Jonathan Wade	Cornerback	Tennessee
5	139	Dustin Fry	Center	Clemson
5	154	Clifton Ryan	Defensive tackle	Michigan State
6	190	Ken Shackleford	Offensive tackle	Georgia
7	248	Keith Jackson	Defensive Tackle	Arkansas
7	249	Derek Stanley	Wide receiver	Wisconsin–Whitewater

The 2007 NFL draft began on April 28, 2007, and with the thirteenth pick overall, the Rams selected Defensive end Adam Carriker from Nebraska. The Rams have said that Carriker would be moved to the Defensive tackle position to help with the run defense. With the Rams second round pick they selected Fullback Brian Leonard out of Rutgers. His style of play is similar to that of Jim Taylor.

On the second day of the draft the Rams selected Cornerback Jonathan Wade from Tennessee in the third round. With a 4.4 second 40-yard dash, Wade will add some speed at the cornerback position. In the fifth round the Rams selected Center Dustin Fry out of Clemson. With Andy McCollum and Brett Romberg competing for the starting position at Center, Fry will likely be the third stringer at that position. Later in the fifth round the Rams selected Defensive tackle Clifton Ryan from Michigan State. The Rams stated that he will be used as a Nose Tackle. In the sixth round the Rams selected Offensive tackle Ken Shackleford from Georgia. Coach Linehan commented that he could develop into a starter over the next couple of years. The Rams had two compensatory picks and selected Arkansas Defensive Tackle Keith Jackson, son of former NFL Pro Bowl tight end Keith Jackson, and Wisconsin–Whitewater wide receiver Derek Stanley.

The Rams traded their fourth-round selection (117th overall) for the Detroit Lions two of their three fifth-round selections (139th and 154th overall). The Rams traded their seventh-round selection (225th overall) to the Miami Dolphins in exchange for signing restricted free agent Donnie Jones. The Rams received two seventh-round picks (248th and 249th overall) as compensatory selections.

== Staff ==
St. Louis Rams 2007 staff
Head coaches: Head coach – Scott Linehan; Assistant head coach/linebackers – Rick Venturi; Offensive coaches: Offensive coordinator – Greg Olson; Quarterbacks – Doug Nussmeier; Running backs – Wayne Moses; Wide receivers – Henry Ellard; Tight ends – Judd Garrett; Offensive line – Paul T Boudreau; Assistant offensive line – Jim Chaney; Offensive assistant/special assistant – Jeff Horton; Offensive quality control – Keith Murphy	Defensive coaches: Defensive coordinator – Jim Haslett; Defensive line – Brian Baker; Assistant linebackers/assistant secondary – Ron Milus; Defensive quality control/defensive line – Mike Cox; Special teams coaches: Special teams coordinator – Al Roberts; Assistant special teams/defensive assistant – Todd Downing; Strength and conditioning: Head strength and conditioning – Dana LeDuc; Assistant strength and conditioning – Brad Roll

== Roster ==
2007 St. Louis Rams roster
Quarterbacks (QB): 3 Brock Berlin; 10 Marc Bulger; 12 Gus Frerotte; Running backs (RB): 33 Rich Alexis; 39 Steven Jackson; 23 Brian Leonard; 30 Antonio Pittman; Wide receivers (WR): 83 Drew Bennett; 80 Isaac Bruce; 15 Marques Hagans KR; 81 Torry Holt; 89 Dane Looker; 19 Derek Stanley KR; 16 Brandon Williams KR/PR; Tight ends (TE): 86 Dominique Byrd; 88 Joe Klopfenstein; 84 Randy McMichael; 49 Richard Owens	Offensive linemen (OL): 70 Alex Barron T; 72 Milford Brown G/T; 62 Dustin Fry C; 77 Brandon Gorin T; 60 Nick Leckey C; 75 Mark LeVoir T; 67 Andy McCollum C/G; 71 Rob Petitti T; 65 Brett Romberg G; 79 Todd Steussie G; Defensive linemen (DL): 94 Victor Adeyanju DE; 90 Adam Carriker DT; 97 La'Roi Glover DT; 96 James Hall DE; 93 Trevor Johnson DE; 92 Eric Moore DE; 95 Clifton Ryan DT; 99 Claude Wroten DT	Linebackers (LB): 54 Brandon Chillar OLB; 53 Quinton Culberson OLB; 52 Chris Draft OLB; 59 Tim McGarigle MLB; 51 Will Witherspoon MLB; Defensive backs (DB): 21 Oshiomogho Atogwe FS; 24 Ron Bartell CB; 41 Eric Bassey CB/S; 34 Fakhir Brown CB; 25 Corey Chavous SS; 35 Todd Johnson SS; 37 Hanik Milligan FS; 31 Darius Vinnett CB; 20 Jonathan Wade CB; Special teams (ST): 5 Donnie Jones P; 45 Chris Massey LS; 14 Jeff Wilkins K	Practice squad: 98 C. J. Ah You DE; 58 Larry Edwards LB; 18 Eric Fowler WR; 32 Justin Phinisee CB; 61 Donovan Raiola C; 17 Dominique Thompson WR; 36 John David Washington RB; Reserve: 42 Jerome Carter S (IR); 73 Adam Goldberg T (IR); 82 Dante Hall WR/KR/PR (IR); 26 Tye Hill CB (IR); 68 Richie Incognito G (IR); 91 Leonard Little DE (IR); 22 Travis Minor RB (IR); 76 Orlando Pace T (IR); 66 Mark Setterstrom C (IR); 56 Raonall Smith LB (IR); 50 Pisa Tinoisamoa LB (IR); 87 Aaron Walker TE (IR); Rookies in italics 53 active, 12 reserve, 7 practice squad

== Preseason ==
Week	Date	Opponent	Result	Record	Game site	NFL.com recap
1	August 10	at Minnesota Vikings	W 13–10	1–0	Hubert H. Humphrey Metrodome	Recap
2	August 18	San Diego Chargers	L 13–30	1–1	Edward Jones Dome	Recap
3	August 24	at Oakland Raiders	L 10–20	1–2	McAfee Coliseum	Recap
4	August 30	Kansas City Chiefs	W 10–3	2–2	Edward Jones Dome	Recap

== Schedule ==
Week	Date	Opponent	Result	Record	Game site	NFL.com recap
1	September 9	Carolina Panthers	L 13–27	0–1	Edward Jones Dome	Recap
2	September 16	San Francisco 49ers	L 16–17	0–2	Edward Jones Dome	Recap
3	September 23	at Tampa Bay Buccaneers	L 3–24	0–3	Raymond James Stadium	Recap
4	September 30	at Dallas Cowboys	L 7–35	0–4	Texas Stadium	Recap
5	October 7	Arizona Cardinals	L 31–34	0–5	Edward Jones Dome	Recap
6	October 14	at Baltimore Ravens	L 3–22	0–6	M&T Bank Stadium	Recap
7	October 21	at Seattle Seahawks	L 6–33	0–7	Qwest Field	Recap
8	October 28	Cleveland Browns	L 20–27	0–8	Edward Jones Dome	Recap
9	Bye					
10	November 11	at New Orleans Saints	W 37–29	1–8	Louisiana Superdome	Recap
11	November 18	at San Francisco 49ers	W 13–9	2–8	Monster Park	Recap
12	November 25	Seattle Seahawks	L 19–24	2–9	Edward Jones Dome	Recap
13	December 2	Atlanta Falcons	W 28–16	3–9	Edward Jones Dome	Recap
14	December 9	at Cincinnati Bengals	L 10–19	3–10	Paul Brown Stadium	Recap
15	December 16	Green Bay Packers	L 14–33	3–11	Edward Jones Dome	Recap
16	December 20	Pittsburgh Steelers	L 24–41	3–12	Edward Jones Dome	Recap
17	December 30	at Arizona Cardinals	L 19–48	3–13	University of Phoenix Stadium	Recap

== Standings ==
NFC West
	W	L	T	PCT	DIV	CONF	PF	PA	STK
^{(3)} Seattle Seahawks	10	6	0	.625	5–1	8–4	393	291	L1
Arizona Cardinals	8	8	0	.500	3–3	5–7	404	399	W2
San Francisco 49ers	5	11	0	.313	3–3	4–8	219	364	L1
St. Louis Rams	3	13	0	.188	1–5	3–9	263	438	L4

== Week-by-week results ==
=== Week 1: vs. Carolina Panthers ===
Quarter	1	2	3	4	Total
Panthers	7	0	7	13	27
Rams	7	3	3	0	13

at Edward Jones Dome, St. Louis, Missouri

- Game time: 1:00 pm EDT/12:00 pm CDT
- Game weather: Indoors
- Game attendance: 65,307
- TV: FOX

The Rams began their 2007 campaign at home against the Carolina Panthers. In the first quarter, St. Louis trailed early as Panthers quarterback Jake Delhomme completed a 10-yard touchdown pass to wide receiver Drew Carter. The Rams would tie the game with quarterback Marc Bulger completing a 3-yard touchdown pass to wide receiver Torry Holt. In the second quarter, St. Louis would take the lead with kicker Jeff Wilkins getting a 42-yard field goal for the only score of the period. In the third quarter, Wilkins added to the Rams' lead with a 28-yard field goal. However, this was all wiped out as Delhomme completed a 68-yard touchdown pass to wide receiver Steve Smith. In the fourth quarter, Carolina took over for the remainder of the game as kicker John Kasay nailed a 34-yard field goal, Delhomme and Carter hooked up with each other again on a 9-yard touchdown pass, and Kasay finished the game with 32-yard field goal.

The game was notable when offensive tackle Orlando Pace had a season-ending injury. This injury severely hurt the Rams' offense.

With the loss, St. Louis began its season at 0–1.

=== Week 2: vs. San Francisco 49ers ===
Quarter	1	2	3	4	Total
49ers	0	7	7	3	17
Rams	7	6	0	3	16

at Edward Jones Dome, St. Louis, Missouri

- Game time: 1:00 pm EDT/10 AM PDT
- Game weather: 78 °F or 25.6 °C (Sunny) (Game was played indoors)
- Game attendance: 65,295
- Referee: Jeff Triplette
- TV: FOX

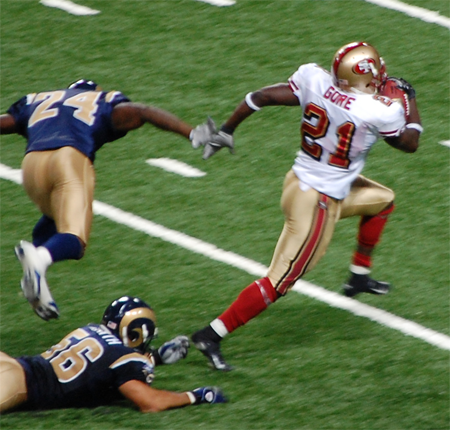
The 49ers' Frank Gore scores on a 4th down and short play in week 2

Hoping to rebound from their loss to the Panthers, the Rams stayed at home for a Week 2 divisional duel against the San Francisco 49ers.

In the first quarter, St. Louis got on the board first with quarterback Marc Bulger completing a 12-yard touchdown pass to wide receiver Torry Holt for the only score of the period. In the second quarter, the 49ers tied the game up with running back Frank Gore getting a 1-yard touchdown run. The Rams would respond with kicker Jeff Wilkins getting a 27 and a 29-yard field goal.

In the third quarter, San Francisco took the lead with Gore getting an amazing 43-yard touchdown run for the only score of the period.

In the fourth quarter, St. Louis retook the lead with Wilkins getting a 53-yard field goal. However, when the Rams were on the receiving end of a kickoff, a muffed catch led to 49ers kicker Joe Nedney getting a 40-yard field goal. With little time left in the game, Bulger got his team into position for a game-winning field goal. Unfortunately, Wilkins' 56-yard attempt fell about a yard short of the crossbar.

With the loss, St. Louis fell to 0–2.

=== Week 3: at Tampa Bay Buccaneers ===
Quarter	1	2	3	4	Total
Rams	0	0	0	3	3
Buccaneers	0	3	7	14	24

at Raymond James Stadium, Tampa, Florida

- Game time: Sunday September 23, 2007 – 1:00 p.m. EDT
- Game weather: 89 °F or 31.7 °C (Sunny)
- Game attendance: 65,257
- TV announcers (FOX): Sam Rosen, Tim Ryan, & Chris Myers

Trying to snap a two-game skid, the Rams flew to Raymond James Stadium for an intraconference duel with the Tampa Bay Buccaneers. After a scoreless first quarter, Tampa Bay managed to strike first prior to halftime with kicker Matt Bryant getting a 27-yard field goal. After a scoreless third quarter, St. Louis got its only score of the game with kicker Jeff Wilkins getting a 25-yard field goal to begin the fourth quarter. Afterwards, the Buccaneers ended the game with running back Earnest Graham getting an 8-yard and a 28-yard touchdown run.

With the loss, the Rams fell to 0–3.

=== Week 4: at Dallas Cowboys ===
Quarter	1	2	3	4	Total
Rams	0	7	0	0	7
Cowboys	0	14	21	0	35

- Game time: 1:00 pm EST
- Game weather: 85 °F or 29.4 °C (Sunny)
- Game attendance: 62,866
- Referee: Walt Anderson
- TV announcers (FOX): Joe Buck (play-by-play), Troy Aikman (color commentator), & Pam Oliver (sideline reporter)

Still searching for their first win of the year, the Rams flew to Texas Stadium for a Week 4 showdown with the Dallas Cowboys. After a scoreless first quarter, St. Louis trailed early as Cowboys running back Julius Jones got a 2-yard touchdown run. Later in the period, the Rams would get their only score of the game as wide receiver Dante Hall returned a punt 85 yards for a touchdown. Afterwards, Dallas regained the lead with quarterback Tony Romo getting a 15-yard touchdown run.

In the third quarter, the Cowboys managed to put the game away with Romo hooking up with wide receiver Patrick Crayton on a 59-yard and a 37-yard touchdown pass. Afterwards, the scoring ended with Romo's 17-yard touchdown pass to tight end Jason Witten.

With no touchdowns in their last 30 offensive possessions to go with their fourth-straight loss, the Rams fell to 0–4.

=== Week 5: vs. Arizona Cardinals ===
Quarter	1	2	3	4	Total
Cardinals	3	14	3	14	34
Rams	3	10	7	11	31

at Edward Jones Dome, St. Louis, Missouri

- Game time: 1:00 pm EDT/12:00 pm CDT
- Game weather: 90 °F or 32.2 °C (Sunny) (Game was played indoors)
- Game attendance: 61,788
- Referee: Gerry Austin
- TV: FOX

Still searching for their first win of the year, the Rams went home for a Week 5 divisional duel with the Arizona Cardinals. With quarterback Marc Bulger out with an injured rib cage, back-up quarterback Gus Frerotte got the start. In the first quarter, St. Louis took the early lead with kicker Jeff Wilkins getting a 46-yard field goal. The Cardinals would tie the game with kicker Neil Rackers getting a 50-yard field goal. In the second quarter, the Rams regained the lead with Frerotte completing a 16-yard touchdown pass to wide receiver Drew Bennett. However, Arizona tied the game with running back Edgerrin James fumbling at the 1-yard line and offensive guard Reggie Wells recovering the ball in the end zone. Afterwards, St. Louis regained the lead with Wilkins kicking a 35-yard field goal. However, the Cardinals took the lead prior to halftime with quarterback Kurt Warner getting a 1-yard touchdown run.

In the third quarter, the Rams regained the lead with Frerotte completing an 11-yard touchdown pass to wide receiver Torry Holt. Afterwards, Arizona tied the game with Rackers nailing a 32-yard field goal. In the fourth quarter, St. Louis continued its struggles with Cardinals cornerback Roderick Hood returning an interception 68 yards for a touchdown. The Rams would answer with Wilkins getting a 31-yard field goal, but the Cardinals increased its lead with Warner completing a 7-yard touchdown pass to wide receiver Larry Fitzgerald. St. Louis tried to come back as Frerotte completed a 29-yard touchdown pass to tight end Randy McMichael, along with Frerotte's 2-point conversion pass to Holt. Unfortunately, Arizona held on to win.

With yet another loss, the Rams fell to 0–5.

=== Week 6: at Baltimore Ravens ===
Quarter	1	2	3	4	Total
Rams	0	0	3	0	3
Ravens	3	10	3	6	22

- Game time: 1:00 pm EST
- Game weather: 65 °F or 18.3 °C (Sunny)
- Game attendance: 71,175
- Referee: Tony Corrente
- TV: FOX

Still looking for their first win of the year, the Rams flew to M&T Bank Stadium for a Week 6 interconference duel with the Baltimore Ravens. With Marc Bulger still out with injuries, quarterback Gus Frerotte was given the start. In the first quarter, St. Louis' struggles continued with Ravens kicker Matt Stover getting a 43-yard field goal for the only score of the period. In the second quarter, Baltimore increased its lead with Stover kicking a 42-yard field goal, along with running back Willis McGahee getting a 6-yard touchdown run.

In the third quarter, the Rams continued its struggles with Stover giving the Ravens a 23-yard field goal. Afterwards, St. Louis got its only score of the game with kicker Jeff Wilkins getting a 32-yard field goal. In the fourth quarter, Baltimore finished the game with Stover getting a 31-yard and a 36-yard field goal.

With yet another loss, the Rams fell to 0–6 for the first time since 1962. It would be the second time in franchise history the Rams began a season 0–6.

During the loss, St. Louis committed 6 turnovers, with 5 of them being Frerotte interceptions.

Along with the Miami Dolphins, it marked the first time since the Bengals and Chargers in 2000 that two teams began a season at 0–6.

=== Week 7: at Seattle Seahawks ===
Quarter	1	2	3	4	Total
Rams	3	0	3	0	6
Seahawks	7	3	13	10	33

at Qwest Field, Seattle

- Game time: 4:15 pm EST
- Game weather: 52 °F or 11.1 °C (Rainy)
- Game attendance: 68,164
- Referee: Jerome Boger
- TV: FOX

Still trying to get their first win of the year, the Rams flew to Qwest Field for a Week 7 divisional duel with the Seattle Seahawks. In the first quarter, St. Louis trailed early as Seahawks quarterback Matt Hasselbeck completed a 1-yard touchdown pass to tight end Will Heller. The Rams would reply with kicker Jeff Wilkins getting a 31-yard field goal. In the second quarter, the Seahawks increased its lead with kicker Josh Brown getting a 38-yard field goal for the only score of the period.

In the third quarter, Seattle flew further into the lead with wide receiver Nate Burleson returning the half's opening kickoff 91 yards for a touchdown. St. Louis would answer with Wilkins kicking a 29-yard field goal, yet the Seahawks continued its domination with Brown kicking a 48-yard and a 45-yard field goal. In the fourth quarter, Seattle sealed the win with Brown getting a 43-yard field goal, while Hasselbeck and Heller hooked up with each other again on an 11-yard touchdown pass.

With the loss, the Rams fell to 0–7 for the first time in franchise history.

=== Week 8: vs. Cleveland Browns ===
Quarter	1	2	3	4	Total
Browns	3	14	7	3	27
Rams	14	3	3	0	20

at Edward Jones Dome, St. Louis, Missouri

- Game time: 1:00 pm EDT/12:00 pm CDT
- Game weather: Indoors
- Game attendance: 62,777
- Referee: Mike Carey
- TV: CBS

Still trying to get their first win of the year, the Rams came home for their Week 8 interconference duel with the Cleveland Browns. In the first quarter, running back Steven Jackson (in his first game back from a groin injury) helped St. Louis off to an early start with a 2-yard touchdown run. Afterwards, the Rams added onto their score with quarterback Marc Bulger completing a 1-yard touchdown pass to wide receiver Torry Holt. The Browns would get on the board with kicker Phil Dawson getting a 35-yard field goal. In the second quarter, St. Louis' struggles continued as Cleveland took the lead with quarterback Derek Anderson completing a 12-yard touchdown pass to wide receiver Braylon Edwards and a 21-yard touchdown pass to tight end Kellen Winslow. The Rams' remaining response of the half was kicker Jeff Wilkins getting a 40-yard field goal.

In the third quarter, St. Louis continued to strain itself as Anderson and Edwards hooked up again to give the Browns a 5-yard touchdown pass. The Rams tried to come back as Wilkins kicked a 46-yard field goal. Unfortunately, St. Louis once again fell as Dawson nailed a 45-yard field goal for Cleveland.

With the loss, not only did the Rams enter their bye week at 0–8, but they became the first team since the 2001 Detroit Lions to begin a season 0–8 after finishing the previous season at .500 or better.

=== Week 10: at New Orleans Saints ===
Quarter	1	2	3	4	Total
Rams	7	10	10	10	37
Saints	7	0	0	22	29

at Louisiana Superdome, New Orleans

- Game weather: Game played indoors (domed stadium)
- Game attendance: 70,003
- Referee: Scott Green
- TV: FOX

Coming off their bye week, the winless Rams headed into New Orleans to face the streaking Saints, who had won four straight games headed into the game. It looked much the same on the Saints opening drive that culminated in a 7-yard burst by Reggie Bush to give the Saints an early 7–0 lead. However, Steven Jackson answered with a 1-yard run of his own to tie the game toward the end of the first quarter.

Midway through the second quarter, Randy McMichael gave the Rams a 14–7 lead on a 2-yard pass from Jackson. Jeff Wilkins made it a two-score game with a 49-yard field goal three minutes later. The Rams went to the locker room leading 17–7.

In the second half, Wilkins kicked his 2nd field goal of the game, a 21-yard attempt, to increase the Rams lead to 13. Toward the end of the third quarter, Isaac Bruce caught a 9-yard pass by Marc Bulger to make it a 27–7 lead, and put the Rams in position for their first victory of 2007.

Drew Bennett added to the St. Louis lead by catching a three-yard pass by Bulger to give Bulger his second touchdown of the game, and to give St. Louis a surprising 34–7 lead. Drew Brees and Billy Miller hooked up for a 1-yard pass with 11:36 left to cut the lead to 34–13. The Saints then converted a two-point conversion on a Reggie Bush run, to make it 34–15. Aaron Stecker then scored on a two-yard run with 4:42 remaining to cut it to 34–21. This time, however, they failed on the two-point conversion. With 1:55 left, a Wilkins field goal made it 37–21, and, despite another New Orleans touchdown with 37 seconds left, the Rams held on for their first victory of 2007, a 37–29 win over the Saints.

With the win, the Rams improved to 1–8.

=== Week 11: at San Francisco 49ers ===
Quarter	1	2	3	4	Total
Rams	7	3	0	3	13
49ers	3	0	0	6	9

at Bill Walsh Field at Monster Park, San Francisco

- Game time: 4:15 pm EDT/3:15 pm CDT
- Game weather: 62 °F or 16.7 °C (Cloudy)
- Referee: Ed Hochuli
- TV announcers (FOX): Chris Myers (play-by-play) and Rod Woodson (color commentator)

Coming off their first win of the year against the Saints, the Rams flew to Bill Walsh Field at Monster Park for a Week 11 NFC West rematch with the throwback-clad San Francisco 49ers. In the first quarter, St. Louis drew first blood as quarterback Marc Bulger completed a 3-yard touchdown pass to wide receiver Torry Holt. The 49ers responded with kicker Joe Nedney getting a 28-yard field goal. In the second quarter, the Rams increased their lead with kicker Jeff Wilkins getting a 49-yard field goal for the only score of the period.

After a scoreless third quarter, St. Louis continued its domination as Wilkins kicked a 35-yard field goal. San Francisco tried to come back as Nedney nailed a 38-yard and a 46-yard field goal, yet St. Louis managed to hold a late drive to seal the victory.

With the win, not only did the Rams improve to 2–8, but they also became the sixth NFL franchise to reach 500 overall wins.

Wide receiver Isaac Bruce ended this game with 13,795 career receiving yards (6th All-Time).

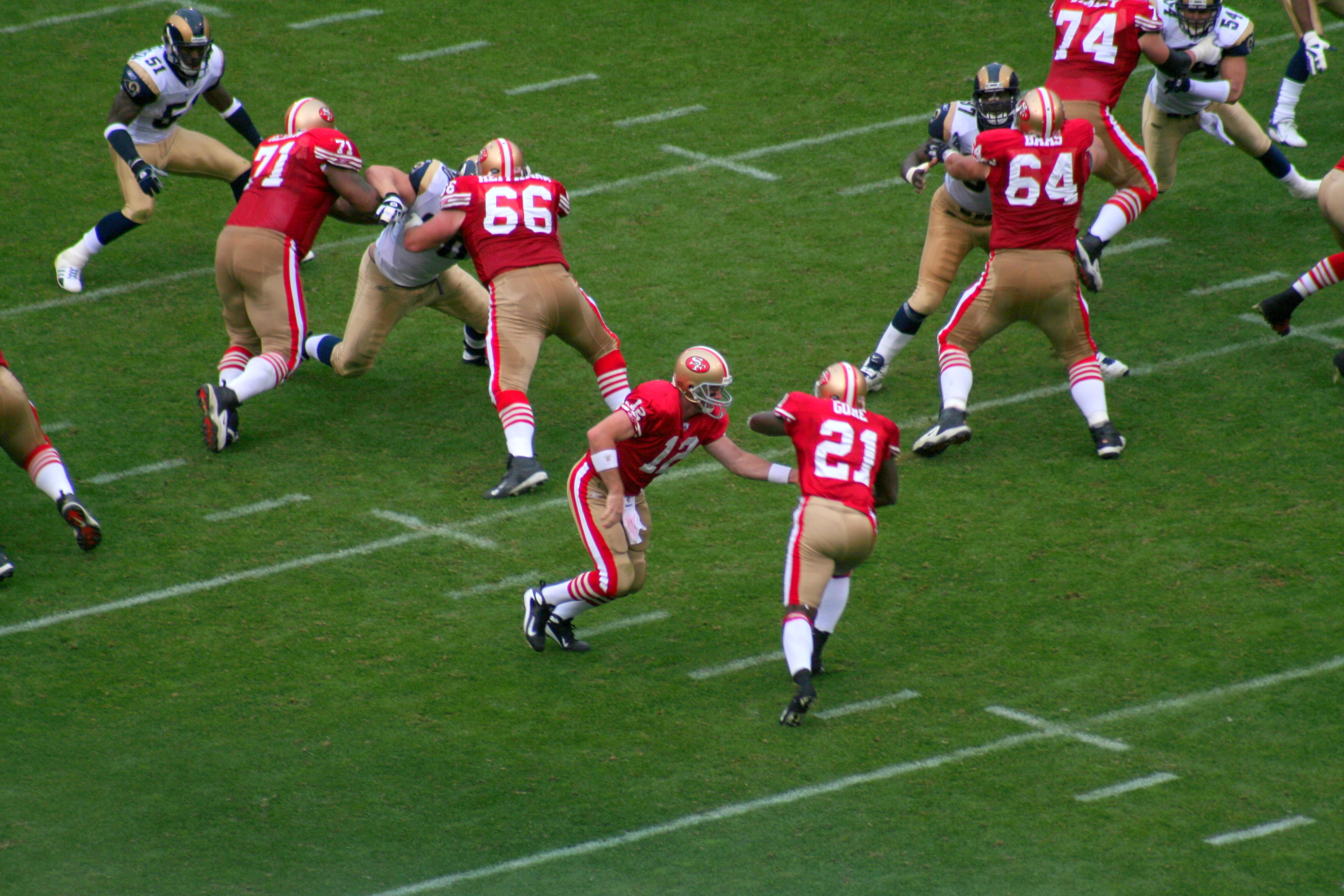
Frank Gore takes a handoff

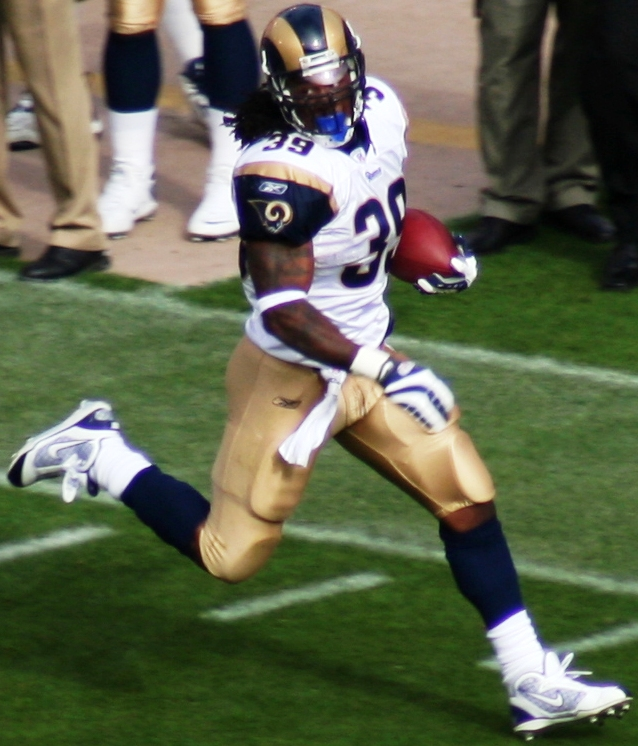
Rams running back Steven Jackson at the 49ers

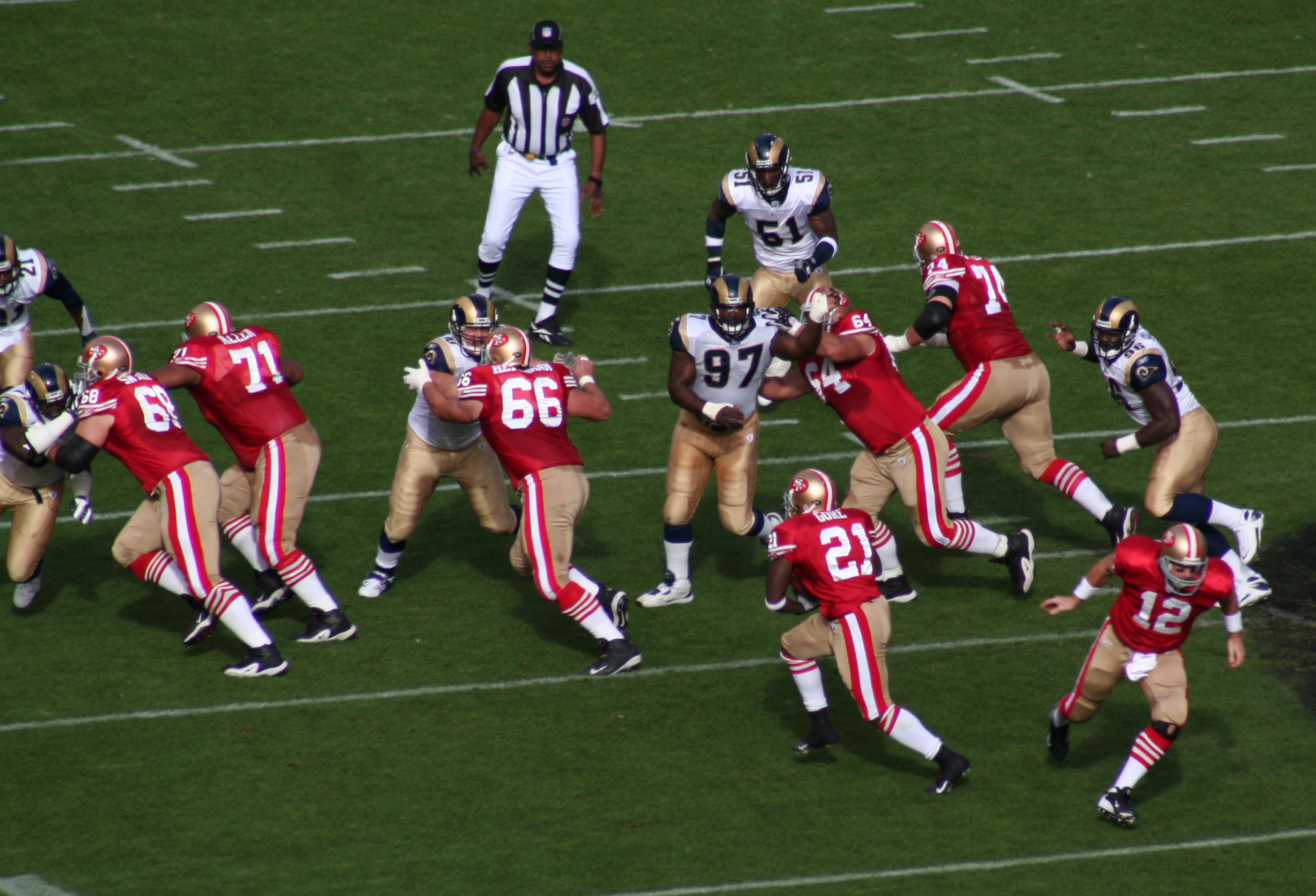
Gore runs up the middle

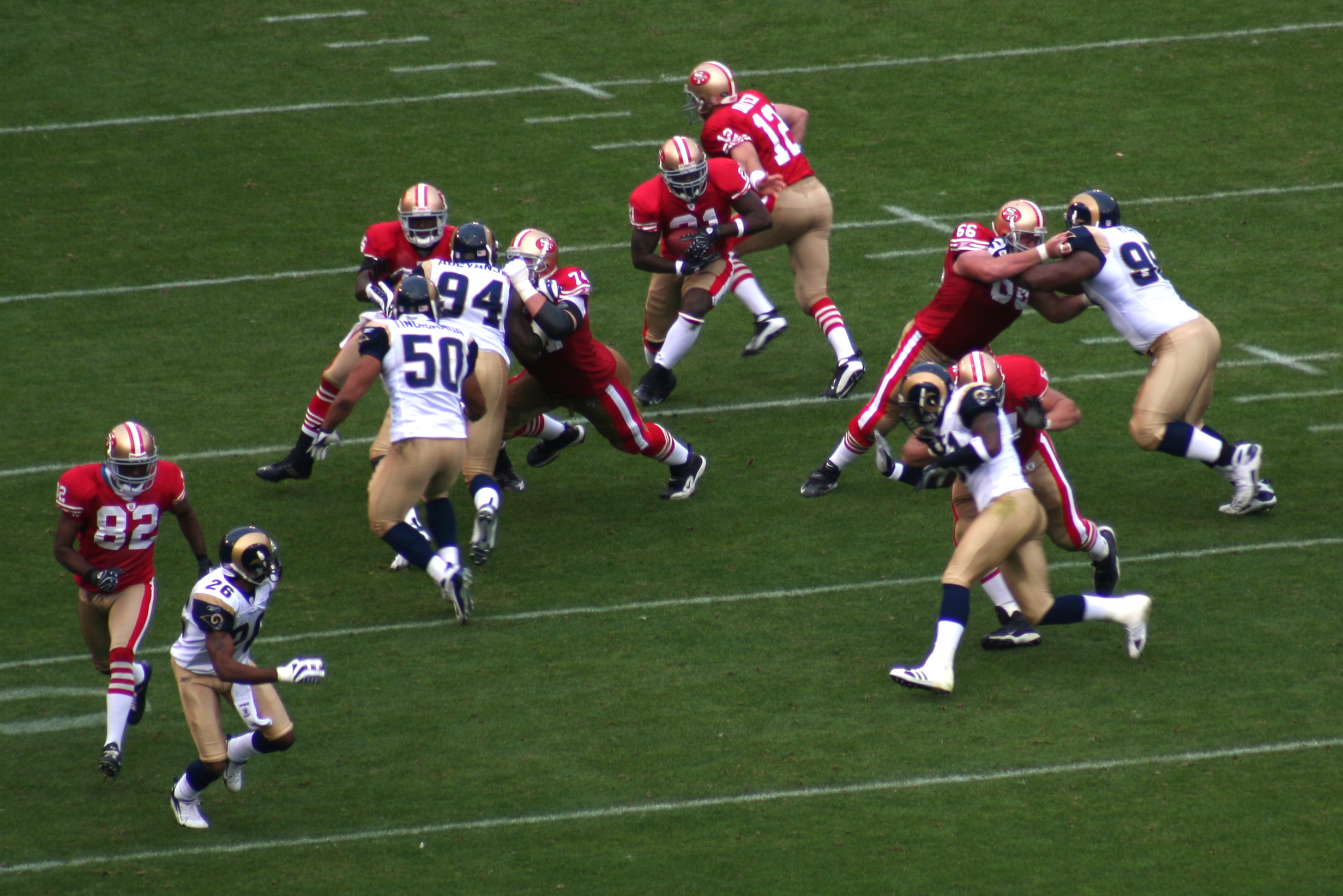
Trent Dilfer hands off to Gore

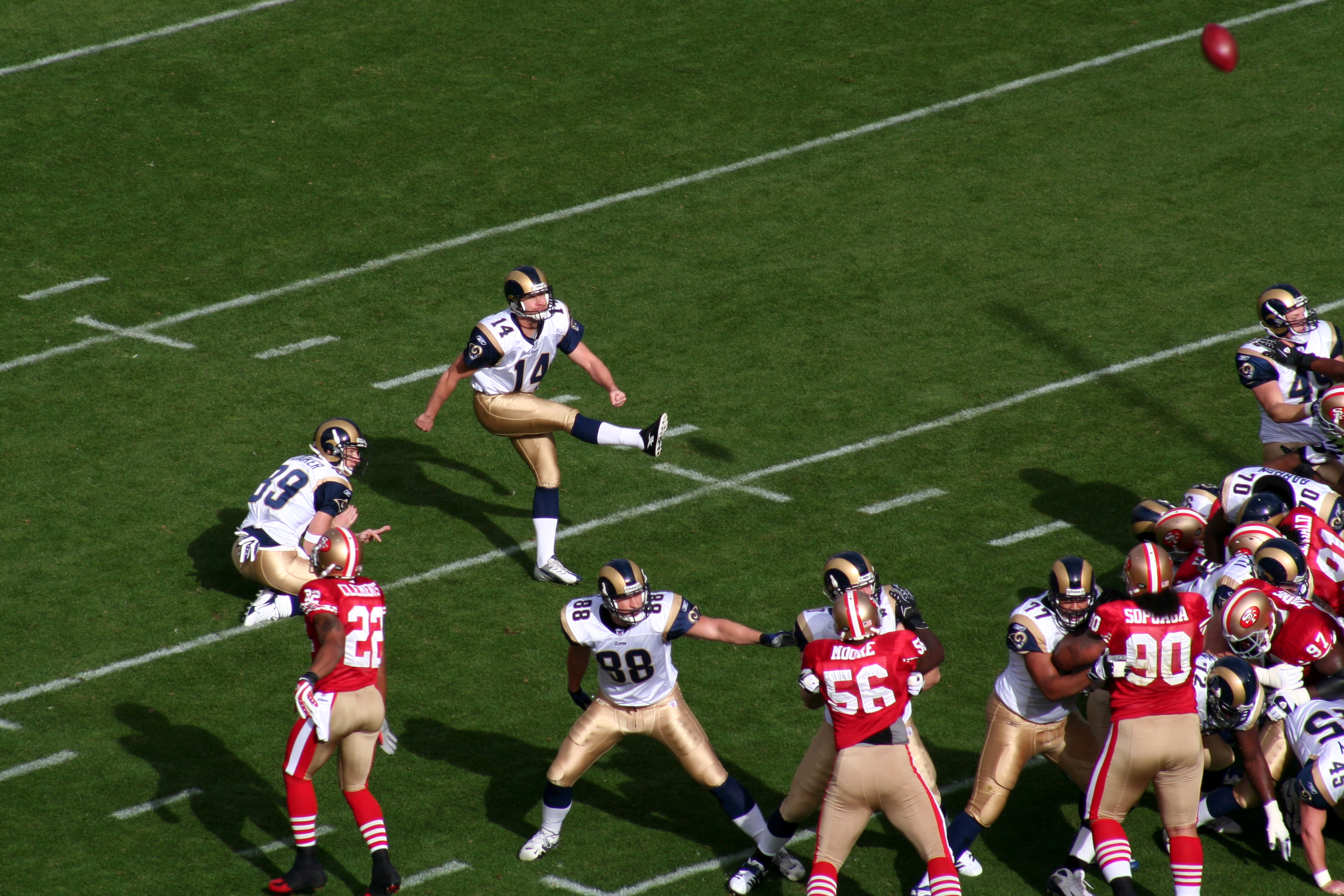
Jeff Wilkins attempts a kick for the Rams

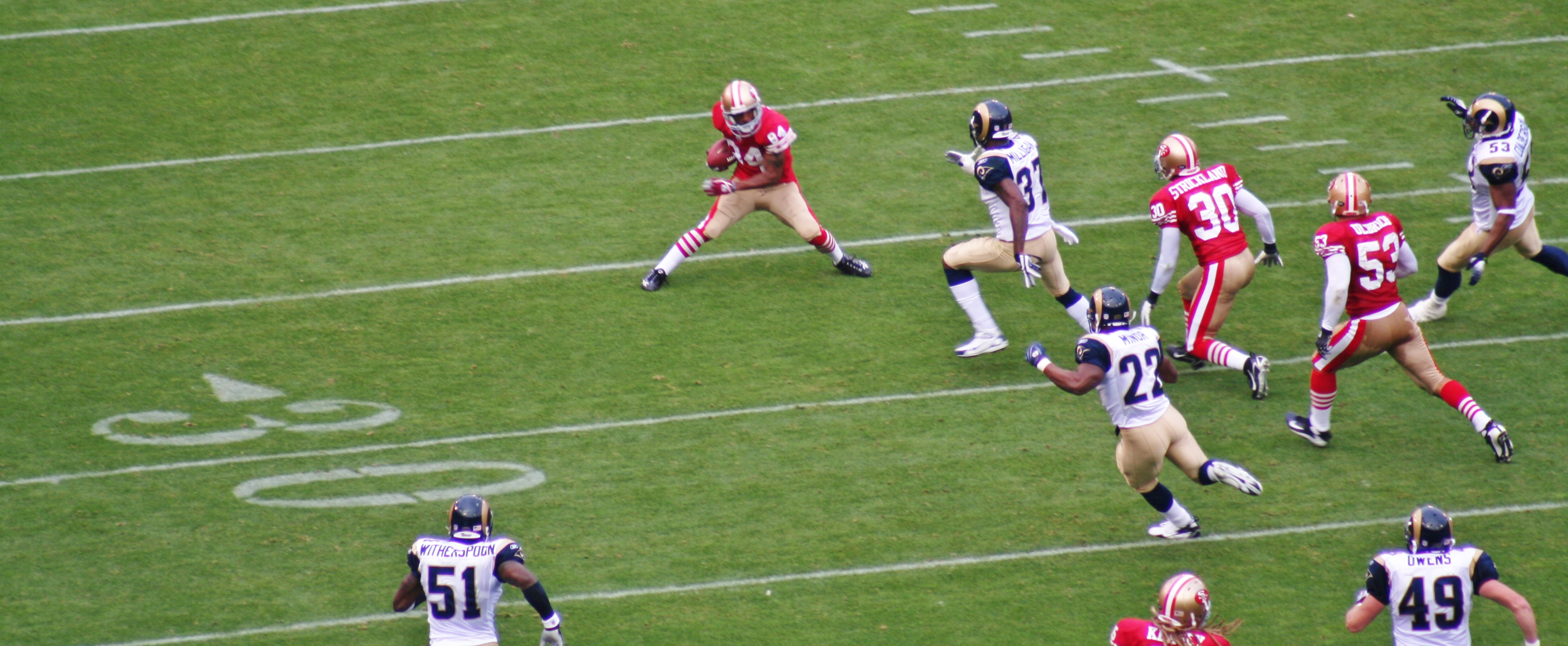
49ers punt return by Michael Lewis (wide receiver)

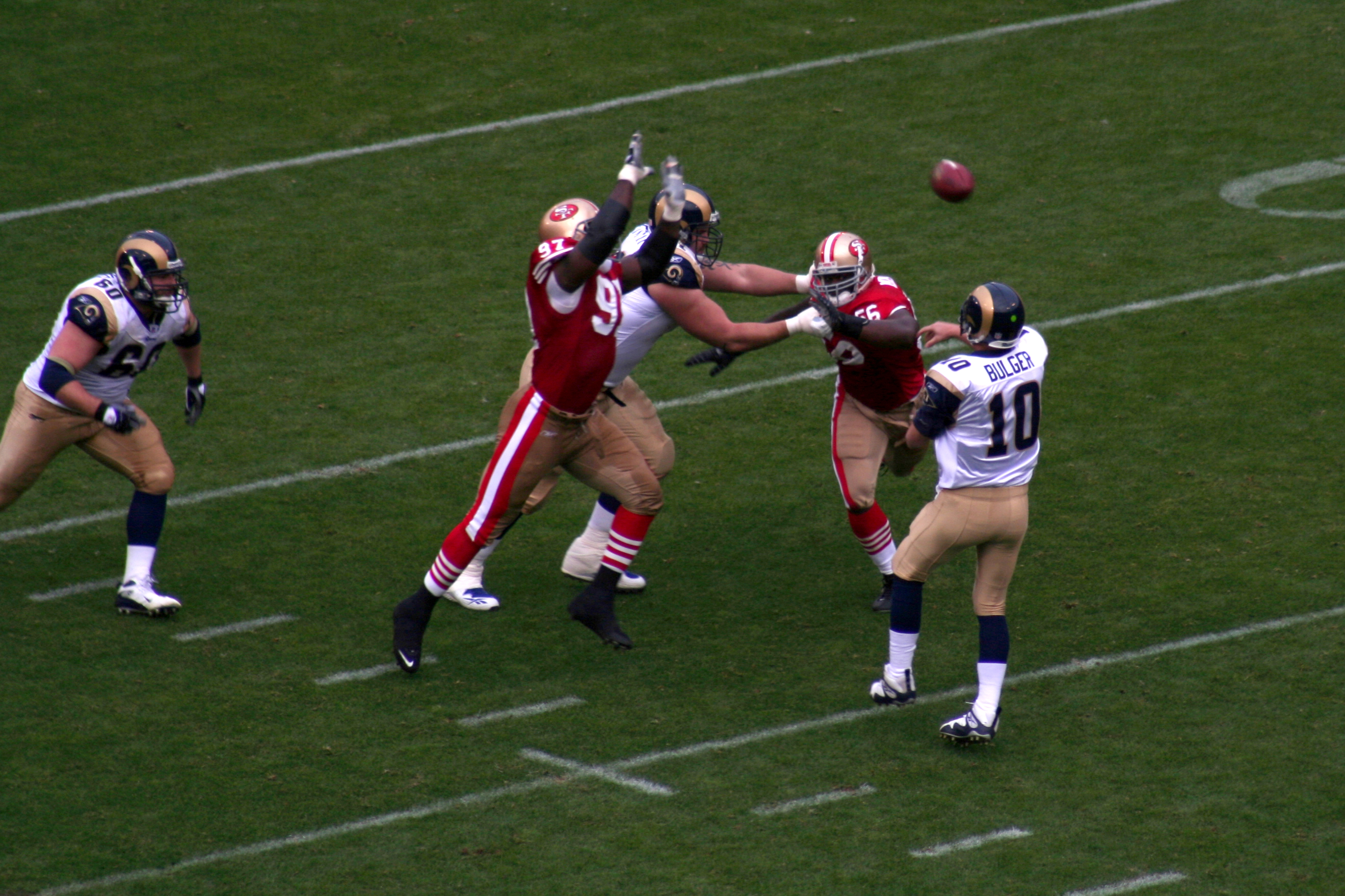
Rams quarterback Marc Bulger attempts a pass behind Brandon Moore (linebacker)

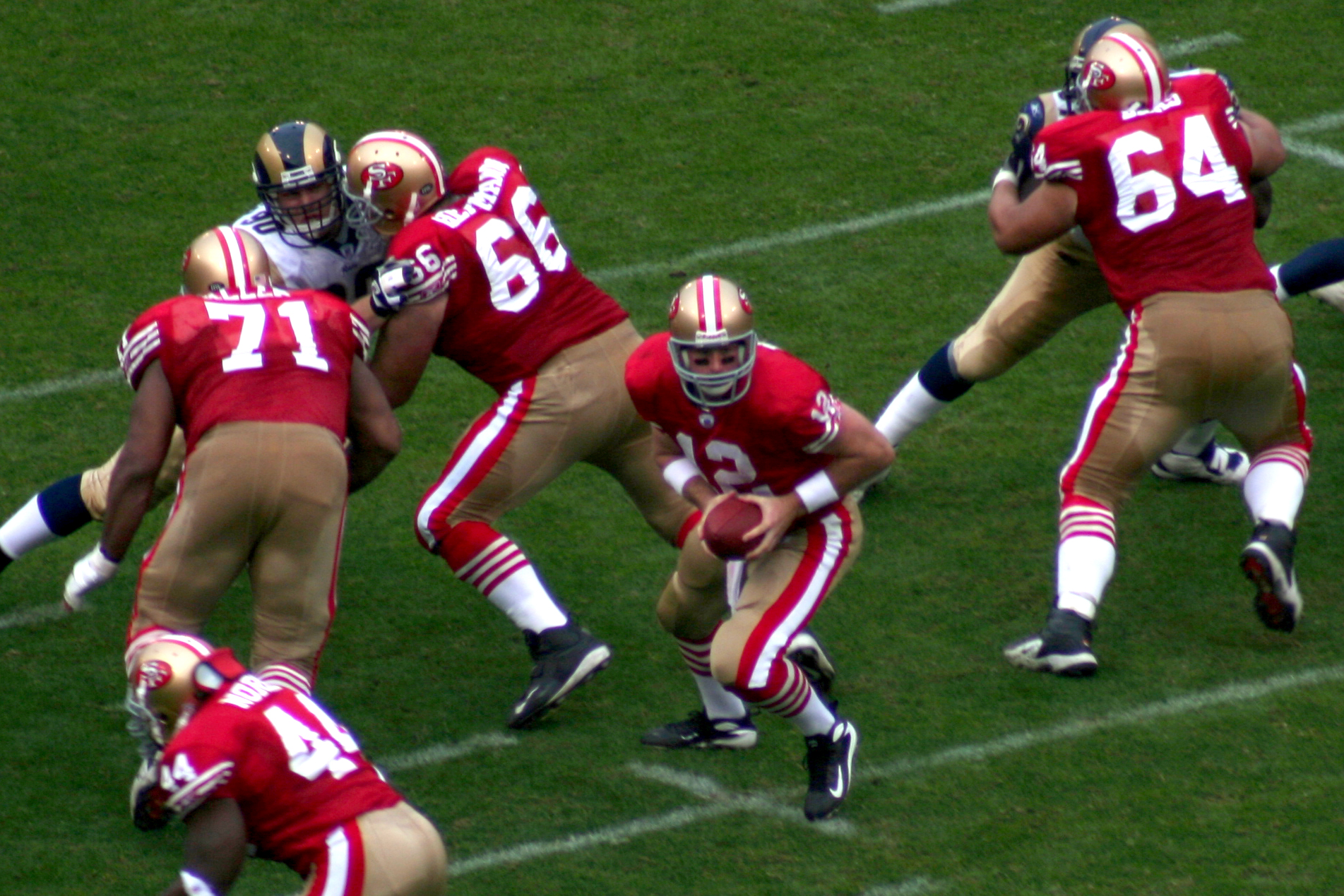
The 49ers on offense

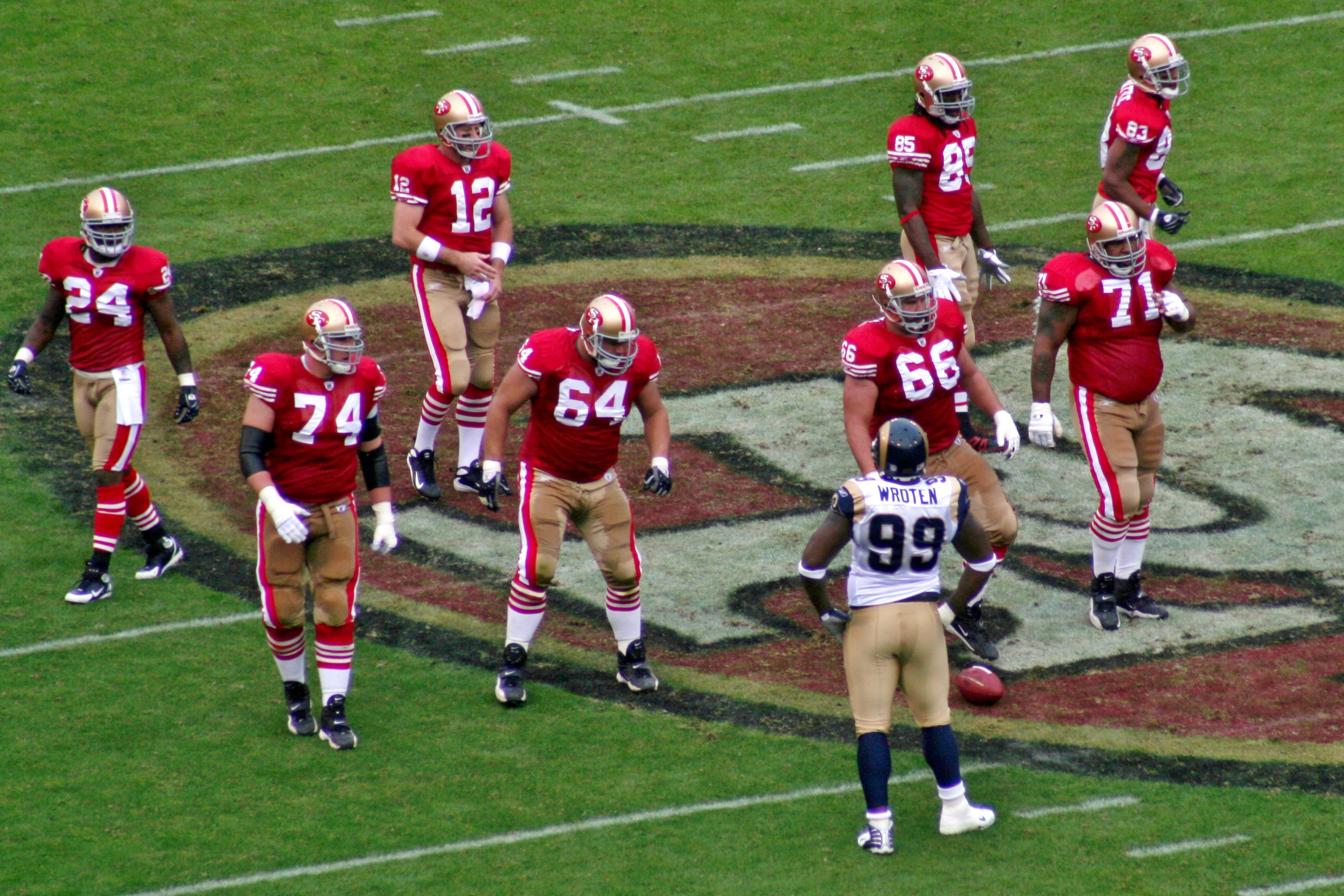
49ers offensive line sets up

=== Week 12: vs. Seattle Seahawks ===
Quarter	1	2	3	4	Total
Seahawks	7	0	10	7	24
Rams	16	3	0	0	19

at Edward Jones Dome, St. Louis, Missouri

- Game time: 4:15 pm EDT/3:15 pm CDT
- Game weather: Game played indoors (Domed Stadium)
- Game attendance: 65,423
- Referee: Walt Coleman
- TV announcers (FOX): Matt Vasgersian (play-by-play) & J. C. Pearson (color commentator)

Coming off their divisional road win over the 49ers, the Rams went home for a Week 12 NFC West rematch with the Seattle Seahawks. In the first quarter, St. Louis got off to a fast start as rookie nose tackle Adam Carriker tackled Seahawks running back Maurice Morris in Seattle's end zone for a safety, while running back Steven Jackson got a 53-yard touchdown run. The Seahawks immediately answered as cornerback Josh Wilson returned a kickoff 89 yards for a touchdown. Afterwards, the Rams went back to work as quarterback Gus Frerotte completed a 15-yard touchdown pass to wide receiver Isaac Bruce. In the second quarter, St. Louis improved its lead with kicker Jeff Wilkins getting a 23-yard field goal.

In the third quarter, Seattle drew closer as kicker Josh Brown nailed a 33-yard field goal, while quarterback Matt Hasselbeck completed a 9-yard touchdown pass to wide receiver Deion Branch. In the fourth quarter, the Seahawks took the lead as running back Leonard Weaver got a 5-yard touchdown run. Near the end of the game, St. Louis managed to get into position to score from the Seahawks' 5-yard line. However, on four-straight downs the Rams were kept out and Seattle managed to get the win.

With their sixth-straight loss to the Seahawks, the Rams fell to 2–9.

Quarterback Marc Bulger (3/5 for 32 yards and 1 interception) left the game in the first quarter with a concussion and did not make a return.

=== Week 13: vs. Atlanta Falcons ===
Quarter	1	2	3	4	Total
Falcons	0	0	3	13	16
Rams	14	7	0	7	28

at Edward Jones Dome, St. Louis, Missouri

- Game time: 1:00 p.m. EST
- Game weather: Game played indoors (Domed stadium)
- Game attendance: 52,051
- Referee: Peter Morelli
- TV announcers (FOX): Ron Pitts (play-by-play) & Tony Boselli (color commentator)

Hoping to rebound from their divisional home loss to the Seahawks, the Rams stayed at home for a Week 13 intraconference duel with the Atlanta Falcons. With quarterback Marc Bulger out with a concussion, veteran back-up quarterback Gus Frerotte got the start.

In the first quarter, St. Louis drew first blood as Frerotte completed a 1-yard touchdown pass to tight end Randy McMichael and a 31-yard touchdown pass to wide receiver Torry Holt. In the second quarter, the Rams increased their lead with Frerotte completing an 8-yard touchdown pass to wide receiver Isaac Bruce for the only score of the period.

In the third quarter, the Falcons got on the board with kicker Morten Andersen nailing a 41-yard field goal for the only score of the period. In the fourth quarter, Atlanta drew close with quarterback Chris Redman completing a 15-yard touchdown pass to wide receiver Roddy White and a 5-yard touchdown to wide receiver Michael Jenkins. Afterwards, St. Louis pulled away with running back Steven Jackson getting a 50-yard touchdown run.

With the win, the Rams improved to 3–9.

For Isaac Bruce, he ended this game with 13,911 career receiving yards, surpassing Cris Carter for 5th All-Time.

=== Week 14: at Cincinnati Bengals ===
Quarter	1	2	3	4	Total
Rams	0	0	7	3	10
Bengals	7	3	6	3	19

at Paul Brown Stadium, Cincinnati

- Game time: 1:00 pm EDT/12:00 pm CDT
- Game weather: 38 °F or 3.3 °C (Light rain)
- Game attendance: 65,143
- Referee: Larry Nemmers
- TV announcers (FOX): Pat Summerall (play-by-play) & Brian Baldinger (color commentator)

Coming off their home win over the Falcons, the Rams flew to Paul Brown Stadium for a Week 14 interconference duel with the Cincinnati Bengals. With quarterback Marc Bulger out with a concussion and veteran back-up quarterback Gus Frerotte out with a shoulder injury, rookie quarterback Brock Berlin got his first NFL start.

In the first quarter, St. Louis trailed early as Bengals running back Rudi Johnson got a 1-yard touchdown run for the only score of the period. In the second quarter, the Rams continued to trail as kicker Shayne Graham gave Cincinnati a 27-yard field goal for the only score of the period.

In the third quarter, St. Louis got on the board as cornerback Fakhir Brown returned an interception 36 yards for a touchdown, yet the Bengals responded with Graham kicking a 38-yard and a 32-yard field goal. In the fourth quarter, the Rams tried to come back as kicker Jeff Wilkins managed to get a 50-yard field goal. However, Cincinnati sealed the win with Graham nailing a 46-yard field goal.

With the loss, St. Louis fell to 3–10.

This would also be the 5th time this year that the Rams were held to 10 or fewer points.

On a positive note, wide receiver Torry Holt went over 1,000 receiving yards for the eighth-straight year.

=== Week 15: vs. Green Bay Packers ===
Quarter	1	2	3	4	Total
Packers	7	10	10	6	33
Rams	7	7	0	0	14

at Edward Jones Dome, St. Louis, Missouri

- Game time: 1:00 pm EDT
- Game weather: Game Played Indoors (Domed Stadium)
- Game attendance: 66,008
- Referee: Ron Winter
- TV announcers (FOX): Kenny Albert (play-by-play), Daryl Johnston (color commentator), & Tony Siragusa (sideline reporter)

Hoping to rebound from their road loss to the Bengals, the Rams went home for a Week 15 duel with the Green Bay Packers. In the first quarter, St. Louis trailed early as Packers running back Ryan Grant completed a 1-yard touchdown run. Afterwards, the Rams tied the game with quarterback Marc Bulger completing a 4-yard touchdown pass to wide receiver Torry Holt. In the second quarter, St. Louis trailed again as quarterback Brett Favre completed a 4-yard touchdown pass to tight end Donald Lee. The Rams would tie again as running back Steven Jackson getting a 46-yard touchdown run. Green Bay would end the half with kicker Mason Crosby getting a 44-yard field goal.

In the third quarter, St. Louis began to trail big as Crosby kicked a 50-yard field goal, along with Favre completing a 44-yard touchdown pass to wide receiver Greg Jennings. In the fourth quarter, the Packers sealed the win as Crosby nailed a 25-yard and a 46-yard field goal.

With the loss, the Rams fell to 3–11. With the 49ers' win over the Bengals on Saturday night, the Rams dropped back down to last in the NFC West.

=== Week 16: vs. Pittsburgh Steelers ===
Quarter	1	2	3	4	Total
Steelers	7	17	7	10	41
Rams	7	10	7	0	24

at Edward Jones Dome, St. Louis, Missouri

- Game time: 8:15 pm EDT
- Game weather: Game Played Indoors (Domed Stadium)
- Game attendance: 65,705
- Referee: Walt Anderson
- TV announcers (NFL Network): Bryant Gumbel (play-by-play), Marshall Faulk, & Deion Sanders (color commentators)

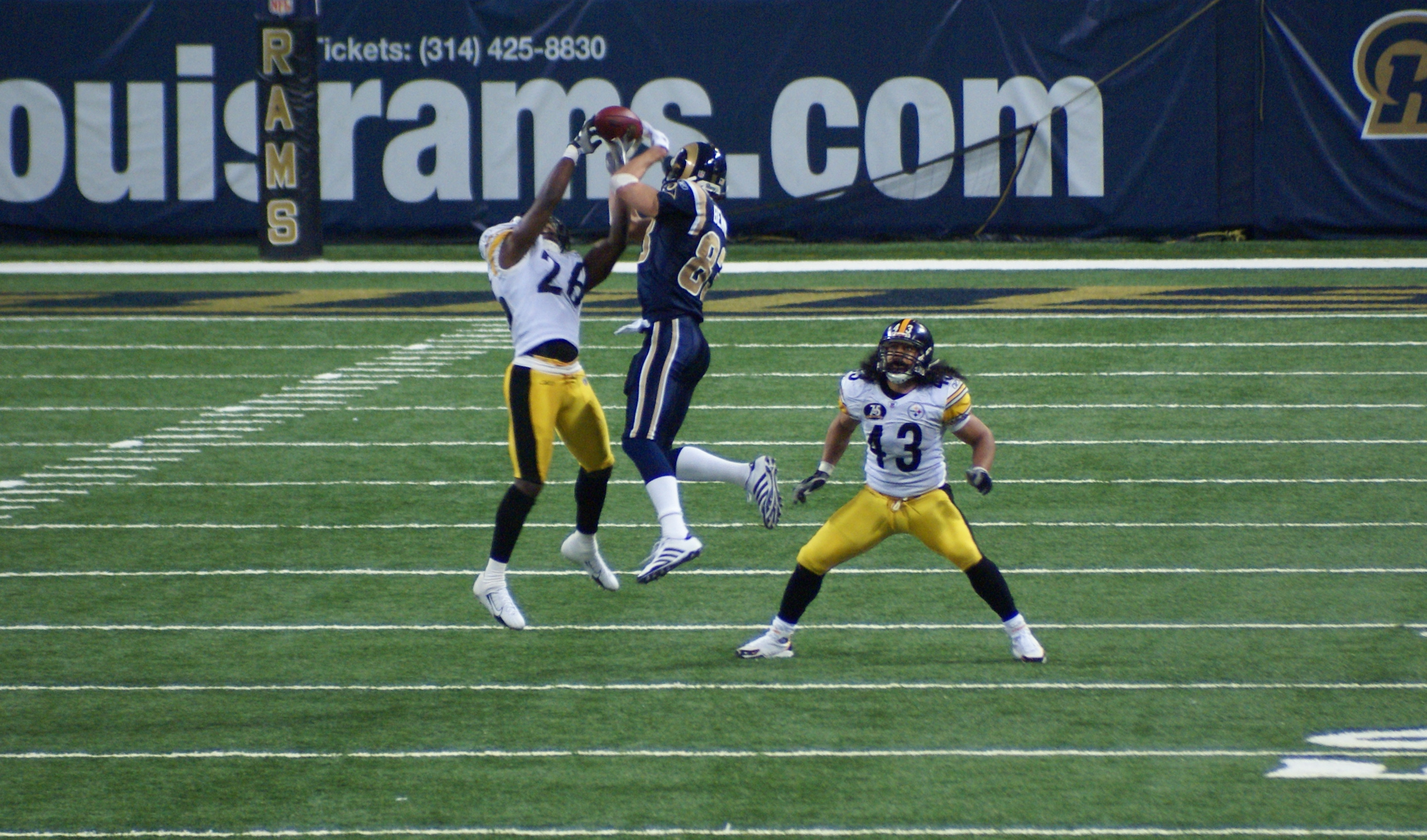
Drew Bennett competes for a catch

Trying to snap a two-game skid, the Rams stayed at home for a Week 16 Thursday night interconference duel with the Pittsburgh Steelers. In the first quarter, St. Louis trailed early as Steelers quarterback Ben Roethlisberger completed a 17-yard touchdown pass to wide receiver Nate Washington. Afterwards, the Rams would tie the game as quarterback Marc Bulger completed a 12-yard touchdown pass to running back Steven Jackson. In the second quarter, Pittsburgh responded with kicker Jeff Reed getting a 21-yard field goal. Afterwards, St. Louis took the lead with Bulger completing a 12-yard touchdown pass to wide receiver Isaac Bruce. However, the Steelers retook the lead with Roethlisberger completing a 33-yard touchdown pass to Washington and a 12-yard touchdown pass to running back Najeh Davenport. The Rams would end the half with kicker Jeff Wilkins getting a 52-yard field goal.

In the third quarter, Pittsburgh increased their lead with Davenport getting a 1-yard touchdown run. St. Louis would reply with Bulger completing a 23-yard touchdown pass to wide receiver Drew Bennett. However, in the fourth quarter, the Steelers sealed the win with Reed nailing a 29-yard field goal and cornerback Ike Taylor returning an interception 51 yards for a touchdown. Cameras caught Torry Holt lash out an obscenity-laced tirade at Scott Linehan after the interception.

The Rams recorded their first home loss to the Steelers, ending a 10-game home winning streak and an 11-game home unbeaten streak against them (which included a tie in 1939).

During halftime, former Rams running back Marshall Faulk's #28 jersey was retired. Also, Isaac Bruce improved to third on the all-time receiving yards list with 14,012 career yards, behind Jerry Rice and Tim Brown.

=== Week 17: at Arizona Cardinals ===
Quarter	1	2	3	4	Total
Rams	3	3	13	0	19
Cardinals	3	21	7	17	48

at Edward Jones Dome, St. Louis, Missouri

- Game time: 4:15 pm EDT/2:15 pm CDT
- Game weather: indoors
- Game attendance: 64,671
- TV: FOX

With the loss, the Rams finished the season at 3–13.
