= Torry Holt =

American football player (born 1976)

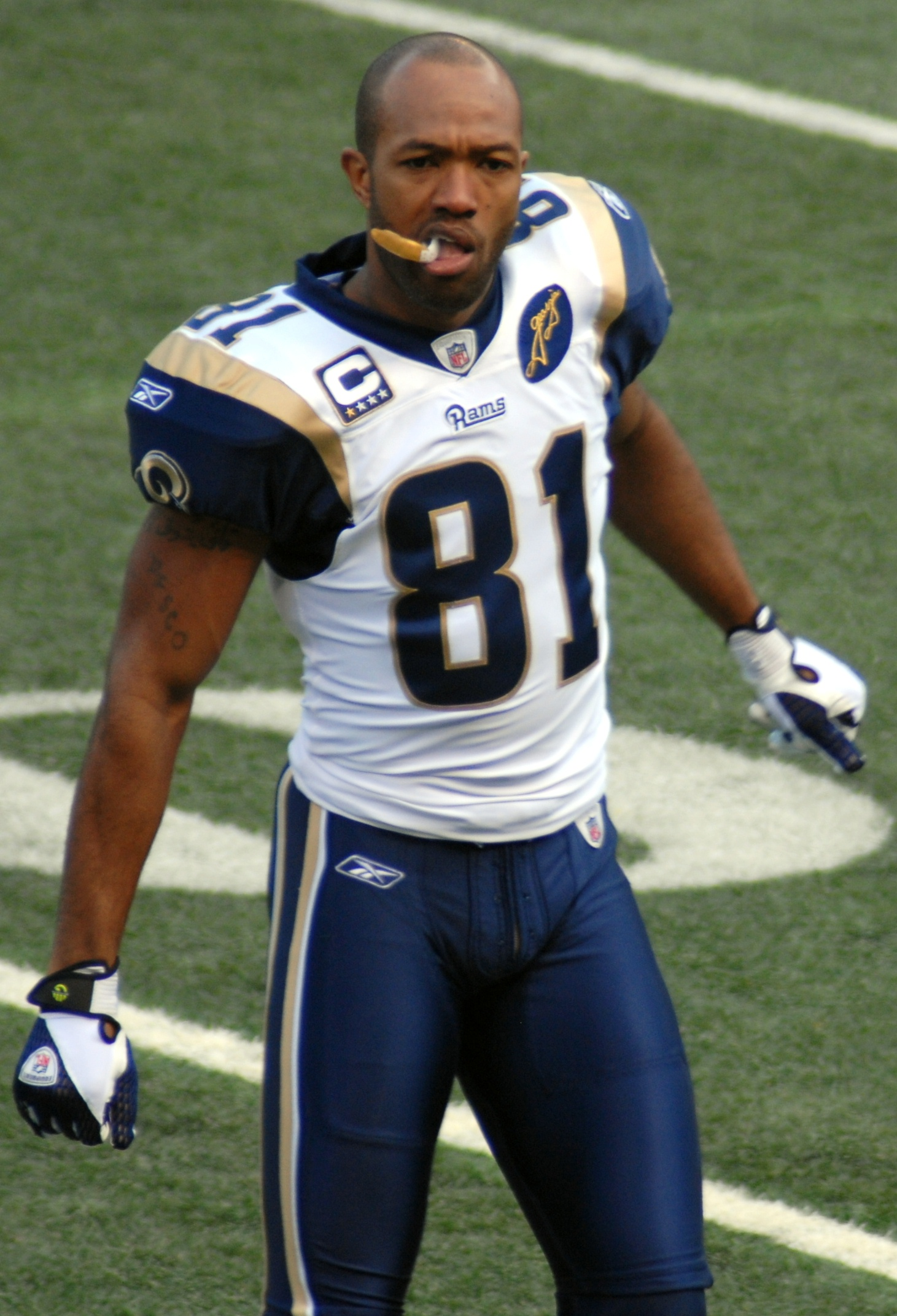
- Holt with the St. Louis Rams in 2008

No. 88, 81
- Position: Wide receiver

Personal information
- Born: June 5, 1976 (age 50); Gibsonville, North Carolina, U.S.
- Listed height: 6 ft 0 in (1.83 m)
- Listed weight: 200 lb (91 kg)

Career information
- High school: Eastern Guilford (Gibsonville)
- College: NC State (1995–1998)
- NFL draft: 1999: 1st round, 6th overall pick

Career history
- St. Louis Rams (1999–2008); Jacksonville Jaguars (2009); New England Patriots (2010)*
- * Offseason or practice squad member only

Awards and highlights
- Super Bowl champion (XXXIV); First-team All-Pro (2003); Second-team All-Pro (2006); 7× Pro Bowl (2000, 2001, 2003–2007); 2× NFL receiving yards leader (2000, 2003); NFL receptions leader (2003); NFL 2000s All-Decade Team; PFWA All-Rookie Team (1999); Consensus All-American (1998); ACC Player of the Year (1998); ACC Offensive Player of the Year (1998); 2× First-team All-ACC (1997, 1998 (Note: Selected as wide receiver and punt returner this season)); NC State Wolfpack No. 81 retired

Career NFL statistics
- Receptions: 920
- Receiving yards: 13,382
- Receiving touchdowns: 74
- Stats at Pro Football Reference
- College Football Hall of Fame

Torry Jabar Holt (born June 5, 1976) is an American former professional football player who was a wide receiver for 11 seasons in the National Football League (NFL). He was named to the Pro Bowl seven times and retired with the 10th most receiving yards, including a record six consecutive seasons with 1,300 yards. Nickanmed "Big Game", he played college football for the NC State Wolfpack, and earned consensus All-American honors.. He was selected by the St. Louis Rams in the first round of the 1999 NFL draft, and spent the next ten years with the Rams and is remembered as one of the members of "The Greatest Show on Turf".

== Early life ==
Holt grew up in Gibsonville, North Carolina. He was Prep Football Report All-America selection, adding all-state honors at Eastern Guilford High School in Gibsonville. While there, he caught 129 passes during his career, gaining 2,573 yards and scoring 42 touchdowns including 56 receptions for 983 yards and 17 touchdowns as senior. He also returned three punts and three kickoffs for touchdowns during his career. Additionally, Holt was a standout defensive back who posted 62 tackles and four interceptions as senior. He was named one of the Top 25 players in the state by the Charlotte Observer. After high school, Holt attended Hargrave Military Academy in 1994. There he caught 21 passes for 524 yards and six touchdowns.

== College career ==
Holt attended North Carolina State University, and played wide receiver for the NC State Wolfpack football team from 1995 to 1998. In his senior year, Holt was named Atlantic Coast Conference Offensive Player of the Year. That season, he set ACC records of 88 receptions (since broken by Kenneth Moore of Wake Forest) for 1,604 yards and an NC State record of 16 touchdown receptions. Holt was a consensus first-team All-American as senior. He was also a finalist for the Fred Biletnikoff Award, given to the nation's top receiver. As a junior, he led the team, setting Wolfpack season records with 62 receptions for 1,099 yards, topping marks of 55 by Naz Worthen (1988) while becoming the first player in team history to gain more than 1,000 yards in a season. He started in five of the first seven games as sophomore. He majored in sociology. Holt's number, 81, was retired in 1999.

== Professional career ==
=== Pre-draft ===
Pre-draft measurables
Height	Weight	Arm length	Hand span	40-yard dash	10-yard split	20-yard split	Vertical jump	Broad jump	Bench press
6 ft 0 1/4 in (1.84 m)	192 lb (87 kg)	30 1/4 in (0.77 m)	9 5/8 in (0.24 m)	4.38 s	1.57 s	2.62 s	37 in (0.94 m)	9 ft 10 in (3.00 m)	15 reps
40-yard dash result is from NC State Pro Day workout, all other values from 1999 NFL Scouting Combine.

After injuring his knee at the Senior Bowl, Holt, at 192 pounds, ran a 4.44 second 40-yard dash and had a vertical jump of 37 inches at the 1999 NFL Combine

=== St. Louis Rams ===
==== 1999 season ====
Holt was the sixth overall draft pick in the first round of the 1999 NFL draft and the first selection made by the St. Louis Rams. On July 23, 1999, Holt signed a five-year, $10 million contract, including a $5.4 million signing bonus, with the Rams. In his NFL debut in Week 1 of the 1999 season, he scored a touchdown against the Baltimore Ravens in a 27–10 win. In Week 12, against the New Orleans Saints, he had two touchdown receptions in the 43–12 win. In Week 14, he had six receptions for 113 yards in a 30–14 win over the Saints. In Week 17, he had five receptions for 122 yards and two touchdowns in a 38–31 loss to the Philadelphia Eagles. In his rookie season, he posted 52 receptions, 788 total yards and six touchdowns on the way to the Super Bowl XXXIV championship. In the Super Bowl, he had seven receptions for 109 yards and a third-quarter touchdown in the 23–16 win over the Tennessee Titans. He was name to the PFWA NFL All-Rookie Team.

==== 2000 season ====
Holt started the 2000 season with back-to-back games with over 100 receiving yards. In Week 4, he had three receptions for 189 yards and two touchdowns in a 41–20 win over the Atlanta Falcons. In Week 10, he had four receptions for 130 yards in a 27–24 loss to the Carolina Panthers. In Week 12, against Washington, he had four receptions for 125 yards in a 33–20 loss. In Week 15, against the Minnesota Vikings, he had nine receptions for 172 yards in a 40–29 win. In Week 16, a road 38–35 loss against the Tampa Bay Buccaneers, he had nine receptions for 165 yards and a touchdown. In the 2000 season, Holt finished with 82 receptions for 1,635 yards and six touchdowns. Holt received Pro Bowl honors for the first time for his performance in the 2000 season.

==== 2001 season ====
In Week 11 of the 2001 season, Holt had eight receptions for 139 yards in the 24–17 loss to the Tampa Bay Buccaneers. In Week 16, a 42–17 win over the Indianapolis Colts, he had seven receptions for 203 yards and two touchdowns. In the 2001 season, he finished with 81 receptions for 1,363 yards and seven touchdowns. He received Pro Bowl honors for the 2001 season. From 1999 to 2001, the Rams scored over 500 points each season, and their offense was dubbed "The Greatest Show on Turf".

==== 2002 season ====
Holt came into the NFL as #88, but in 2002 changed his number to 81 (worn by Az-Zahir Hakim previously). In Week 3 of the 2002 season, he had 12 receptions for 139 yards in a 26–14 road loss to the Tampa Bay Buccaneers. In Week 15, a 30–28 win over the Arizona Cardinals, he had seven receptions for 141 yards and a touchdown. He finished the 2002 season with 91 receptions for 1,302 yards and four touchdowns.

==== 2003 season ====
Prior to the 2003 season, Holt agreed to a 7-year $42 million contract extension that included a $12.5 million signing bonus. In Week 4 of the 2003 season, he had 12 receptions for 133 yards and a touchdown in the 37–13 win over the Arizona Cardinals. In Week 6, a 36–0 win over the Atlanta Falcons, he had 11 receptions for 161 yards and two touchdowns. In the following game, a 34–24 win over the Green Bay Packers, he had two receiving touchdowns. In the following game, he had seven receptions 174 yards and a touchdown in the 33–21 win over the Pittsburgh Steelers. Holt was named NFC Offensive Player of the Month for October 2003. In Week 9, he had 11 receptions for 200 yards and a touchdown in the 30–10 loss to the San Francisco 49ers. In Week 11, he had nine receptions for 124 yards and a touchdown in the 23–21 on the road against the Chicago Bears. In the following game, he had nine receptions for 145 yards in a 30–27 overtime loss on the road against the Arizona Cardinals. In Week 16, he had ten receptions for 124 yards and a touchdown in the 27–10 win against the Cincinnati Bengals. He was named to his third career Pro Bowl. He was named first team All-Pro for the first time. He finished the 2003 season with 117 receptions for 1,696 yards and 12 touchdowns.

==== 2004 season ====
In Week 2, Holt had nine receptions for 121 yards and a touchdown in the 34–17 loss to the Atlanta Falcons. In Week 6, against the Tampa Bay Buccaneers, he had six receptions for 124 yards and two touchdowns in the 28–21 win. In Week 9, against the New England Patriots, he had six receptions for 111 yards and a touchdown in the 40–22 loss. In Week 13, against the San Francisco 49ers, he had ten receptions for 160 yards and a touchdown in the 16–6 win. In Week 14, against the Carolina Panthers, he had six receptions for 151 yards and a touchdown in the 20–7 loss. In Week 17, a 32–29 overtime win over the New York Jets, he had seven receptions for 116 yards and two touchdowns. He was named to his fourth career Pro Bowl. In the 2004 season, Holt finished with 94 receptions for 1,372 yards and ten touchdowns.

In the Wild Card Round, a 27–20 road win over the Seattle Seahawks, Holt had six receptions for 108 yards and a touchdown. In the Divisional Round, he had a receiving touchdown in the 47–17 road loss to the Atlanta Falcons.

==== 2005 season ====
In the Rams' 2005 season opener, Holt had ten receptions for 125 yards in a 28–25 loss to the San Francisco 49ers. From Weeks 2–5, he had a receiving touchdown in four consecutive games. In Week 3, a 31–27 win over the Tennessee Titans, he had nine receptions for 163 yards and a touchdown. In Week 5, a 37–31 win over the Seattle Seahawks, he had eight receptions for 126 yards and a touchdown. In Week 11, he had 11 receptions for 129 yards and a touchdown in the 38–28 loss to the Arizona Cardinals. In Week 12, he had ten receptions for 130 yards and a touchdown in the 33–27 overtime win over the Houston Texans. In Week 16, a 24–20 loss to the 49ers, he had ten receptions for 163 yards and a touchdown. He was named to his fifth career Pro Bowl, which was also his third consecutive nomination. In the 2005 season, Holt finished with 102 receptions for 1,331 yards and nine touchdowns.

==== 2006 season ====
From Week 2 to Week 6, Holt had at least one receiving touchdown in five consecutive games. In that stretch, he had three games with over 100 receiving yards. In Week 6, Holt had eight receptions for 154 yards and three touchdowns in a 30–28 loss to the Seattle Seahawks. In Week 14, a 42–27 loss to the Chicago Bears, he had two receiving touchdowns. He was named to his fourth consecutive and sixth career Pro Bowl. In the 2006 season, he had 93 receptions for 1,188 yards and ten touchdowns.

==== 2007 season ====
In Week 10 of the 2007 season, Holt had eight receptions for 124 yards in a 37–29 win over the New Orleans Saints. In Week 13, he had six receptions for 135 yards and a touchdown in the 28–16 win over the Atlanta Falcons. He was named to his fifth consecutive Pro Bowl. In the 2007 season, he had 93 receptions for 1,189 yards and seven touchdowns.

==== 2008 season ====
In the 2008 season, Holt had 64 receptions for 796 yards and three touchdowns as the Rams went 2–14.

==== Legacy ====
For the six seasons from 2000 to 2005, Holt reached at least 1,300 yards every season, a league record of six consecutive seasons. Holt's streak was broken in 2006, due to injuries to himself and other teammates that hindered the offense for parts of the season.

Holt's career also includes seven Pro Bowls (2000, 2001, 2003–2007) including five straight, 74 career touchdowns for 448 points (including two successful two-point conversions) and 920 career receptions. At the time of his retirement, Holt ranked among the top 10 active leaders in receiving yards, receiving touchdowns, and receptions, and, from 2003-2007, finished in the top ten of those three categories for five straight seasons. Holt has also led the league in receiving yardage on two occasions (2000, 2003), and receptions once (2003).

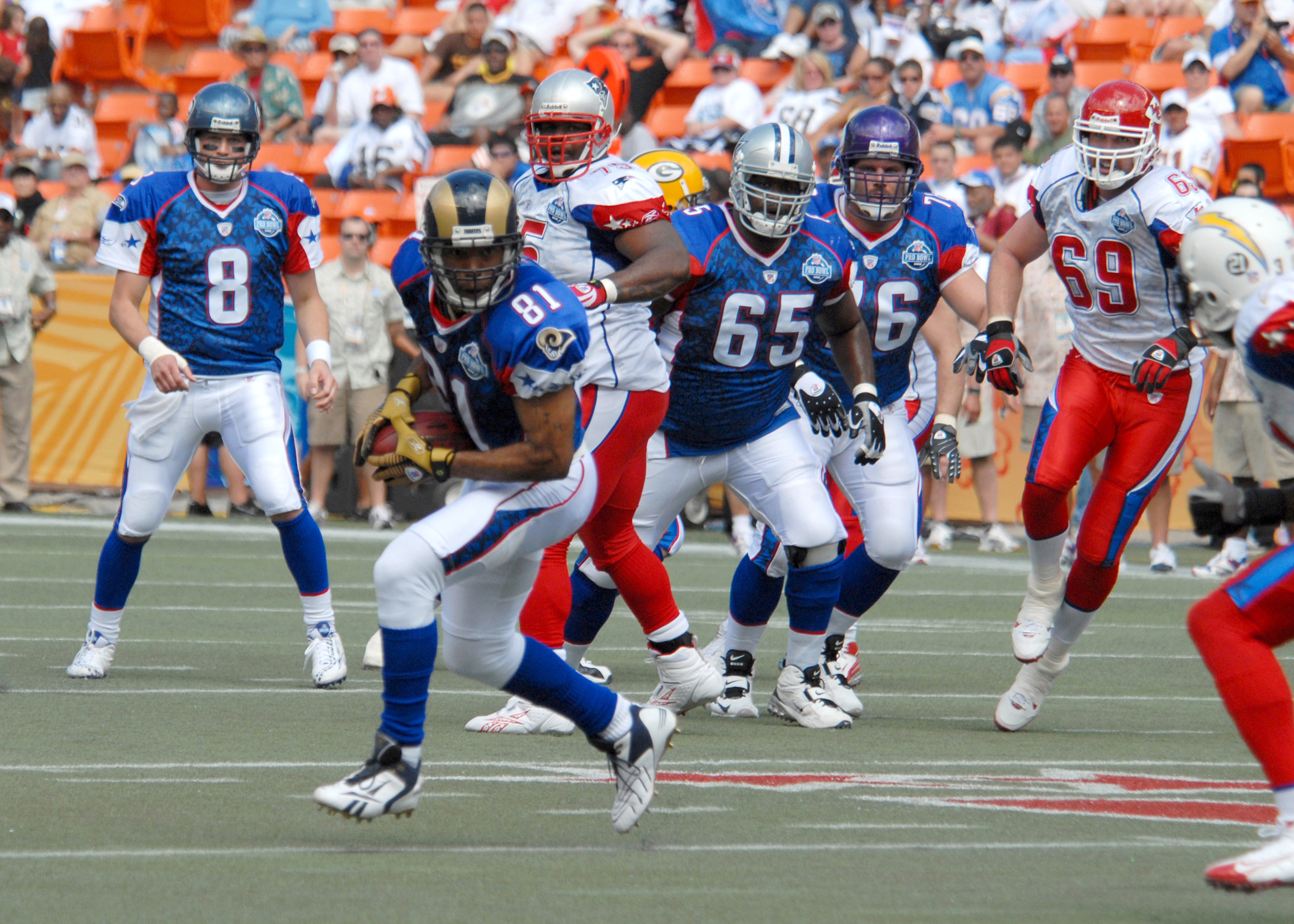
Holt makes a reception at the 2008 Pro Bowl.

Holt led the NFL in receptions in 2003 and led the NFL in receiving yardage in 2000 and 2003. He was a First-team All-Pro in 2003 and a Second-team selection in 2006. On October 15, 2006, Holt became the fastest player in NFL history to reach 10,000 receiving yards doing so in the sixth game of his eighth season and also to 11,000 yards.

His request for a release was granted by the Rams on March 13, 2009. If he was not released, he would have been due $5.65 and $6.65 million in the last two years of his contract.

Holt finished his 10-year career with the Rams starting 147 of 158 games, recording 869 receptions for 12,660 yards, and 74 touchdowns—ranking second in Rams' history in each category behind Isaac Bruce.

=== Jacksonville Jaguars ===
Holt was signed by the Jacksonville Jaguars on April 20, 2009, to a 3-year, $20 million deal. In Week 6, a 23–20 overtime win against his former team, Holt had five receptions for 101 yards against the Rams. Holt had 51 catches and 722 receiving yards. Holt was released by the team on February 11, 2010, and only earned $3.45 million of the $20 million contract.

=== Injuries and retirement ===
On April 20, 2010, Holt signed a one-year, $1.7 million contract with the New England Patriots, but was placed on injured reserve on August 15, 2010, as a result of a knee injury that required surgery and was released by the team on August 17, 2010, with an injury settlement.

On April 4, 2012, Holt signed a ceremonial contract with the St. Louis Rams to retire with the team. He retired from professional football ranked 10th in league history with 13,382 yards receiving and 13th with 920 receptions.

=== Hall of Fame voting ===
As of 2024, Holt has been eligible for the Pro Football Hall of Fame for ten years in a row. He has made it to the semifinalist stage every year and has even been a finalist for five years in a row.

== Career statistics ==
Legend
	Won the Super Bowl
	Led the league
**Bold**	Career high

=== NFL ===
Year	Team	Games		Receiving					Fumbles	
Year	Team	GP	GS	Rec	Yds	Avg	Lng	TD	Fum	Lost
1999	STL	16	15	52	788	15.2	63	6	**3**	**2**
2000	STL	16	15	82	1,635	**19.9**	**85**	6	2	**2**
2001	STL	16	14	81	1,363	16.8	51	7	2	0
2002	STL	16	11	91	1,302	14.3	58	4	1	1
2003	STL	16	15	**117**	**1,696**	14.5	48	**12**	1	0
2004	STL	16	16	94	1,372	14.6	75	10	**3**	1
2005	STL	14	14	102	1,331	13.0	44	9	2	1
2006	STL	16	16	93	1,188	12.8	67	10	2	1
2007	STL	16	16	93	1,189	12.8	40	7	2	1
2008	STL	16	14	64	796	12.4	45	3	0	0
2009	JAX	15	12	51	722	14.2	63	0	1	1
Career		173	158	920	13,382	14.5	85	74	19	10

=== College ===
Season	Team	GP	Receiving		
Season	Team	GP	Rec	Yds	TD
1995	NC State	11	17	261	1
1996	NC State	7	24	415	3
1997	NC State	11	62	1,099	**16**
1998	NC State	11	**88**	**1,604**	11
Total		40	191	3,379	31

== Career highlights ==
=== Awards and honors ===
NFL

- Super Bowl champion (XXXIV)
- First-team All-Pro (2003)
- Second-team All-Pro (2006)
- 7× Pro Bowl (2000, 2001, 2003–2007)
- 2× NFL receiving yards leader (2000, 2003)
- NFL receptions leader (2003)
- NFL 2000s All-Decade Team
- PFWA All-Rookie Team (1999)

College

- Consensus All-American (1998)
- ACC Player of the Year (1998)
- ACC Offensive Player of the Year (1998)
- 2× First-team All-ACC (1997, 1998 (Note: Selected as wide receiver and punt returner this season))
- NC State Wolfpack No. 81 retired

Other

- North Carolina Sports Hall of Fame

=== NFL records ===
- Consecutive seasons with at least 1,300 yards receiving (6) (2000–2005 seasons)
- Consecutive seasons with 90+ receptions (6) (2002–2007 seasons)
- Seasons with 1,600 yards receiving (2, tied with Marvin Harrison, Julio Jones, Antonio Brown, Calvin Johnson, Justin Jefferson and, Tyreek Hill)
- Highest average gain, game (3 receptions +), 63.00, September 24, 2000
- Receptions in a single decade (868, 2000–2009)
- Receiving yards in a single decade (12,594, 2000–2009)

== Post-playing career ==
On November 20, 2010, during the Raycom Sports broadcast of the annual NCSU game with UNC-Chapel Hill, sideline reporter Mike Hogewood prefaced an interview with Holt stating that he had retired. Holt has since gotten into broadcasting with Fox Sports, providing commentary for their NFL coverage.

Holt joined NFL Network in 2010 as an analyst on the network's signature show, NFL Total Access, as well as other NFL Network shows and specials. He made his debut as an analyst on the NFL Total Access: Pro Bowl Selection Show on December 28, 2010.

He is the older brother of safety Terrence Holt. The brothers co-own Holt Brothers, Inc..

Beginning in 2015, Holt became Heritage High School's (NC) assistant football coach and wide receiver's coach, along with former NFL players Dewayne Washington and Willie Parker.
