= Adam Carriker =

American football player (born 1984)

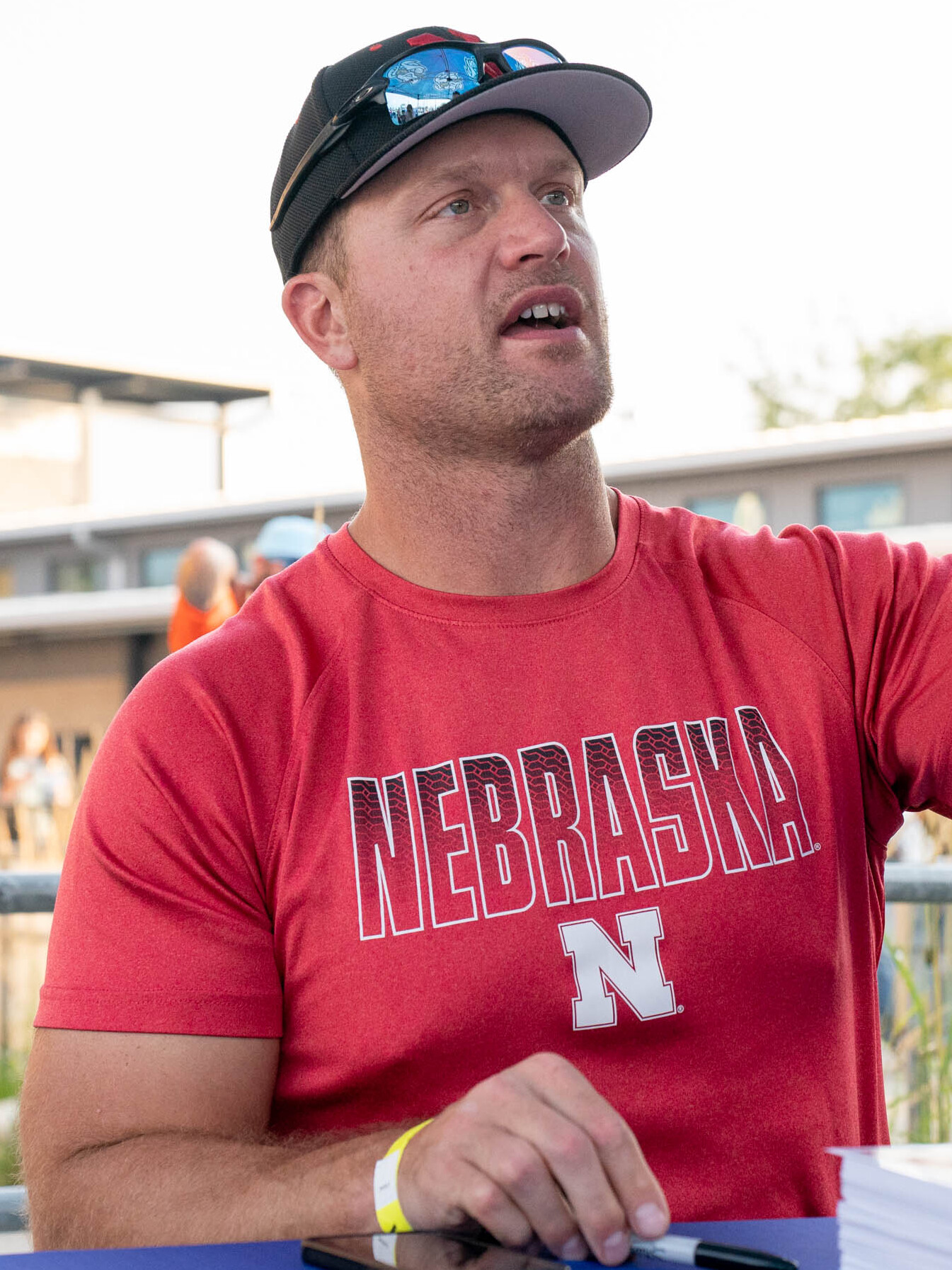
- Carriker in 2025

No. 90, 94
- Position: Defensive end

Personal information
- Born: May 6, 1984 (age 42); Hastings, Nebraska, U.S.
- Listed height: 6 ft 6 in (1.98 m)
- Listed weight: 300 lb (136 kg)

Career information
- High school: Kennewick (WA)
- College: Nebraska (2002–2006)
- NFL draft: 2007: 1st round, 13th overall pick

Career history
- St. Louis Rams (2007–2009); Washington Redskins (2010–2013)

Awards and highlights
- Big 12 Defensive Lineman of the Year (2006); 2× First-team All-Big 12 (2005, 2006)

Career NFL statistics
- Total tackles: 126
- Sacks: 9.0
- Fumble recoveries: 3
- Stats at Pro Football Reference

Adam Eugene Carriker (born May 6, 1984) is an American former professional football player who was a defensive end in the National Football League (NFL). He was selected by the St. Louis Rams in the first round of the 2007 NFL draft. He played college football at the University of Nebraska–Lincoln. He also played for the Washington Redskins.

== Early life ==
Carriker was born in Hastings, Nebraska. He moved to Kennewick, Washington, at the age of three, and attended Kennewick High School, where he played quarterback and defensive end. He was a three-year starter at quarterback and team captain for three years. In his only season at defensive end (his senior season), he recorded 25 tackles, 15 sacks, and four forced fumbles in a winless season. Regardless, he was named to Second-team All-Big 9 Honors. Carriker visited Oregon, Oregon State and Washington State before committing to Nebraska. Additionally, Carriker was a three-time All-Conference selection in baseball.

== College career ==
Carriker redshirted in 2002. In his 2003 freshman season he played extensively in passing situations before injuring his ankle against Utah State. Against the University of Colorado he had three quarterback hurries and ended a CU drive in the third quarter with a nine-yard sack of quarterback Joel Klatt. He finished the year with three tackles and three quarterback hurries. He played in his first bowl game, the 2003 Alamo Bowl after the regular season. In his 2004 sophomore year Carriker was hampered for the second straight season by an ankle injury. He played in 10 games with eight starts in the 2004 campaign, and finished with 36 tackles, including seven tackles for loss and three sacks for 18 yards. Carriker added seven quarterback hurries during his sophomore season.

As a junior in 2005 Carriker started all 12 games at the base end spot, and finished with 9.5 sacks for 84 yards and 17 tackles for loss for 96 yards. His 9½ sacks tied for the Big 12 Conference lead and ranked 19th nationally. He also led Nebraska with 21 quarterback hurries, 10 more than any other Husker defender. Carriker's 43 total tackles ranked seventh on the team and tied for the most among defensive linemen. He began his junior season by notching two of the Huskers' school-record tying 11 sacks in the team's 25–7 win over Maine. Carriker capped 2005 with one tackle in the Alamo Bowl victory over the University of Michigan. Adam was voted 2005 Nebraska Defensive MVP.

As a senior in 2006 Adam Carriker completed a dominant career in the 2006 season Cotton Bowl Classic against Auburn University. In 2006, Carriker earned Nebraska's Defensive MVP honor for the second straight season, and was honored as the Big 12 Defensive Lineman of the Year by the league's coaches. Carriker finished the season with a team-leading seven sacks and ranked second on the team with 16 tackles behind the line of scrimmage. His 52 total tackles led all Nebraska defensive linemen, and he also paced the Blackshirt defense with 12 quarterback hurries, while registering his first career interception. In addition to his selection as Big 12 Defensive Lineman of the Year, Carriker was a First-team All-Big 12 pick by the Big 12 Coaches and the Associated Press. He was also a Third-team All-America selection by Rivals.com.

The strong senior season put Carriker's name in a prominent position in the NU record books. He finished with 41 career tackles for loss to rank fifth in the program's history. Carriker has 20½ career sacks to rank sixth on the Cornhusker charts. Carriker graduated with a degree in business administration.

=== College statistics ===
Year	Team	GP	GS	TT	Solo	Ast	TFL	Sack	PDef	INT	FF	FR	Hurr	BK	TD
2003	Nebraska	9	0	3	2	1	1	0	0	0	0	0	3	0	0
2004	Nebraska	10	8	36	19	17	7	3	0	0	0	0	7	0	0
2005	Nebraska	12	12	43	26	17	17	9½	3	0	0	1	21	0	0
2006	Nebraska	14	14	52	24	28	16	7	3	1	1	0	12	0	0
Career	Nebraska	45	34	134	71	63	41	19½	6	1	1	1	43	0	0

== Professional career ==
Pre-draft measurables
Height	Weight	Arm length	Hand span	40-yard dash	10-yard split	20-yard split	20-yard shuttle	Three-cone drill	Vertical jump	Broad jump	Bench press
6 ft 6 in (1.98 m)	296 lb (134 kg)	33 1/2 in (0.85 m)	9 1/2 in (0.24 m)	4.72 s	1.58 s	2.70 s	4.18 s	7.06 s	33.5 in (0.85 m)	9 ft 2 in (2.79 m)	33 reps
All values from NFL Combine/Pro Day.

=== St. Louis Rams ===
Carriker was selected in the first round, with the 13th overall pick, by the St. Louis Rams. On July 26, 2007, Carriker signed a five-year $14.5 million contract, with guarantees of $9.5 million. Carriker started all 16 games of his rookie season at defensive tackle instead of his college position, defensive end. Carriker, who bulked up from the 296 pounds he weighed at the NFL Scouting Combine, weighed in the 305-pound range during the 2007 season.

He was voted the Rams Rookie of the Year called the Carroll Rosenbloom Memorial Award, finishing with 2 sacks, 32 tackles, and a safety. Carriker missed the entire 2009 NFL season due to injury.

=== Washington Redskins ===
Carriker was traded to the Washington Redskins on April 20, 2010. In exchange, the teams swapped fifth and seventh-round draft picks in 2010. After initial shock, Carriker was pleased about his trade and the chance to revitalize his career.

In Washington, Carriker earned the starting left defensive end position for the Washington Redskins in a 3-4 defensive scheme. With the Rams he was a "3-technique" defensive tackle in a 4-3 defensive scheme which did not work out and led to his trade to the Washington Redskins. "In St. Louis, we tried to make him a 3-technique and up-the-field rusher," said defensive coordinator Jim Haslett. "For a guy who ran the 40 in 4.7 and was 6-6, 315 pounds, you'd think he could do that. But that's not what he wants to do. He wants to play with strength and power, and he does a pretty good job of it. He feels so much more comfortable in this." Carriker's 315 pounds is ideal, and he reported at the beginning of the 2010 season that he bench pressed 500 pounds, which helps him in his new position.

Early in the 2010 season the change drew positive reviews, said Rich Campbell of Fredericksburg.com, "I'm buying Carriker as an impact 3-4 end right now. He's strong enough to set the edge on running plays, and he's even generating a pass rush on occasion. Carriker stopped Houston RB Arian Foster for a 2-yard loss in the second quarter after he made a quick step inside the pulling left guard. He also beat a double team on the first play of the second half to stop Foster for a gain of one. Carriker isn't dominant—but he is flashing."

On March 13, 2012, Carriker re-signed with the Washington Redskins for four years on a $20 million contract with $7 million guaranteed. In Week 2 of the 2012 season against the St. Louis Rams, he suffered a right knee injury early in the first quarter. The next day it was confirmed that he tore quad tendon in his right leg and he would need surgery and would be placed on injured reserve.

Carriker had his contract restructured to help with the salary cap penalty that the Washington Redskins faced last season on March 11, 2013. On July 25, he was placed on the PUP list after the team announced that he had a third surgery on his right knee and would be out for four or five months. On December 12, he was placed on injured reserve. He was released on March 4, 2014.

Carriker participated in the first NFL Veteran Combine in March 2015. He was the only player at the Veteran Combine to do the bench press and performed 40 reps of 225 pounds, which was three more reps than the highest total at the 2015 NFL Combine. In April 2015, he attended minicamp with the Atlanta Falcons on tryout basis.

=== NFL statistics ===
Year	Team	GP	COMB	TOTAL	AST	SACK	FF	FR	FR YDS	INT	IR YDS	AVG IR	LNG	TD	PD
2007	STL	16	30	21	9	2.0	0	0	0	0	0	0	0	0	0
2008	STL	15	23	22	1	0	0	0	0	0	0	0	0	0	0
2010	WSH	16	37	22	15	1.5	0	0	0	0	0	0	0	0	0
2011	WSH	16	34	19	15	5.5	0	0	0	0	0	0	0	0	1
2012	WSH	2	1	1	0	0	0	0	0	0	0	0	0	0	0
Career		65	125	85	40	9.0	0	0	0	0	0	0	0	0	1

== Post-playing career ==
Carriker has used his Business degree and his TV prowess to appear multiple times on Fox News and Fox Business, as a frequently requested business and political analyst.

Carriker has also made multiple public appearances with Nebraska congressional representatives in Washington, D.C.

Carriker also does weekly national writing and radio segments called the "Carriker Chronicles," where he discusses the current state of the NFL and Nebraska Cornhusker football. His other weekly show appearances include "Chad Dukes vs The World" on the largest sports station in Washington, D.C., to discuss his opinion and give his take on the Washington Commanders game every week. In the state of Nebraska he appears every week on "The Bottom Line," the largest sports talk show in the state which is hosted by Mike'l Severe, to give his take on the state of Nebraska football as well.

In April 2012, Carriker began his radio career as co-host of 4th & Pain along with Chuck Carroll. Carriker, an avid WWE fan, touts 4th & Pain as being the only pro wrestling and football radio show hosted by an NFL player and a guy who lost 250 pounds, an homage to his co-host. The show airs weekly online.

The show has gained in popularity and they've interviewed NFL stars such as Robert Griffin III, DeAngelo Hall and Chris Cooley. In June 2012, the show gained notoriety among wrestling fans after Carriker conducted his first interview with WWE wrestler Heath Slater. Since then the show and its audience has continued to grow with interviews of wrestling stars such as Jeff Hardy, Roman Reigns and Bill Goldberg. Goldberg has appeared on the show himself over 20 different times. He has a cited a friendship with Carriker during his interviews on the show as the reason for his frequent appearances. The show also talks Nebraska football from time to time and has had such Husker legends as Eric Crouch and Tommie Frazier join them.

Carriker has also served as a recurring motivational speaker as well.
