= Marc Bulger =

American football player (born 1977)

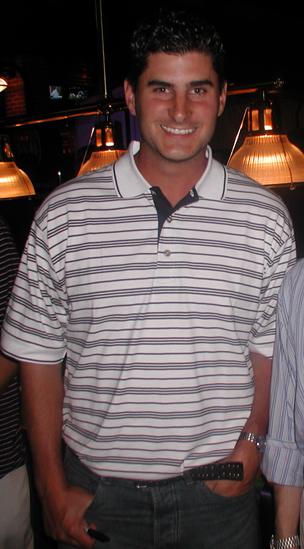
- Bulger in 2004

No. 10
- Position: Quarterback

Personal information
- Born: April 5, 1977 (age 49); Pittsburgh, Pennsylvania, U.S.
- Listed height: 6 ft 2 in (1.88 m)
- Listed weight: 208 lb (94 kg)

Career information
- High school: Central Catholic (Pittsburgh)
- College: West Virginia (1995–1999)
- NFL draft: 2000: 6th round, 168th overall pick

Career history
- New Orleans Saints (2000)*; Atlanta Falcons (2000)*; St. Louis Rams (2000–2009); Baltimore Ravens (2010)
- * Offseason or practice squad member only

Awards and highlights
- 2× Pro Bowl (2003, 2006); Second-team All-Big East (1998)

Career NFL statistics
- Passing attempts: 3,171
- Passing completions: 1,969
- Completion percentage: 62.1%
- TD–INT: 122–93
- Passing yards: 22,814
- Passer rating: 84.4
- Stats at Pro Football Reference

Marc Robert Bulger (/ˈbʊldʒər/; born April 5, 1977) is an American former professional football quarterback who played in the National Football League (NFL) for nine seasons with the St. Louis Rams. He made his first roster spot with the Rams in 2001 after signing with them the previous year, becoming the starter by his third season. Bulger led the Rams to two consecutive playoff appearances and one division title, while earning two Pro Bowl selections. Following his St. Louis tenure, Bulger spent a year as a backup for the Baltimore Ravens before retiring.

== Early life ==
Marc Robert Bulger was born on April 5, 1977, in Pittsburgh, Pennsylvania. He attended Central Catholic High School in Pittsburgh.

== College career ==
Bulger played college football for the West Virginia Mountaineers. He finished with career totals of 8,153 passing yards, 59 passing touchdowns, and 34 interceptions. He was a sport management major.

== Professional career ==
Pre-draft measurables
Height	Weight	Arm length	Hand span	40-yard dash	10-yard split	20-yard split	20-yard shuttle	Three-cone drill	Broad jump	Wonderlic
6 ft 1 5/8 in (1.87 m)	208 lb (94 kg)	30 5/8 in (0.78 m)	9 1/4 in (0.23 m)	4.97 s	1.68 s	2.87 s	4.34 s	7.46 s	8 ft 4 in (2.54 m)	29
All values from NFL Combine

=== New Orleans Saints / Atlanta Falcons ===
Bulger was selected by the New Orleans Saints in the sixth round of the 2000 NFL draft, 168th overall, and spent training camp with the team before being waived. He was the fifth quarterback taken in the draft and one of the six taken before Tom Brady.

Bulger then spent two weeks on the practice squad of the Atlanta Falcons during the 2000 season.

=== St. Louis Rams ===
==== 2000–2001 ====
The St. Louis Rams signed Bulger to the practice squad late in the 2000 season. He re-signed with the Rams on January 12, 2001. As the third-string quarterback in 2001, Bulger did not see any playing time as the team advanced to Super Bowl XXXVI.

==== 2002 ====
In 2002, after the Rams started 0–5, Bulger filled in for an injured Jamie Martin, who had been filling in for the injured Kurt Warner, who was the reigning league MVP. Bulger finished the season with a 6–0 record in games that he both started and finished, but he was injured early in a game against the Seattle Seahawks, and the Rams ended the season at 7–9 and missed the playoffs one year removed from their NFC Championship.

==== 2003 ====
Bulger entered the 2003 season as Warner's backup, but was promoted to No. 1 on the depth chart after Warner committed five turnovers and suffered a concussion in an opening week loss to the New York Giants. Bulger then led the Rams to a regular-season record of 12–4, securing the NFC West title and a first-round bye. The Rams went on to lose a double-overtime thriller to the eventual NFC Champion Carolina Panthers in the divisional round of the playoffs. Bulger made the Pro Bowl where he was the game's MVP.

==== 2004 ====
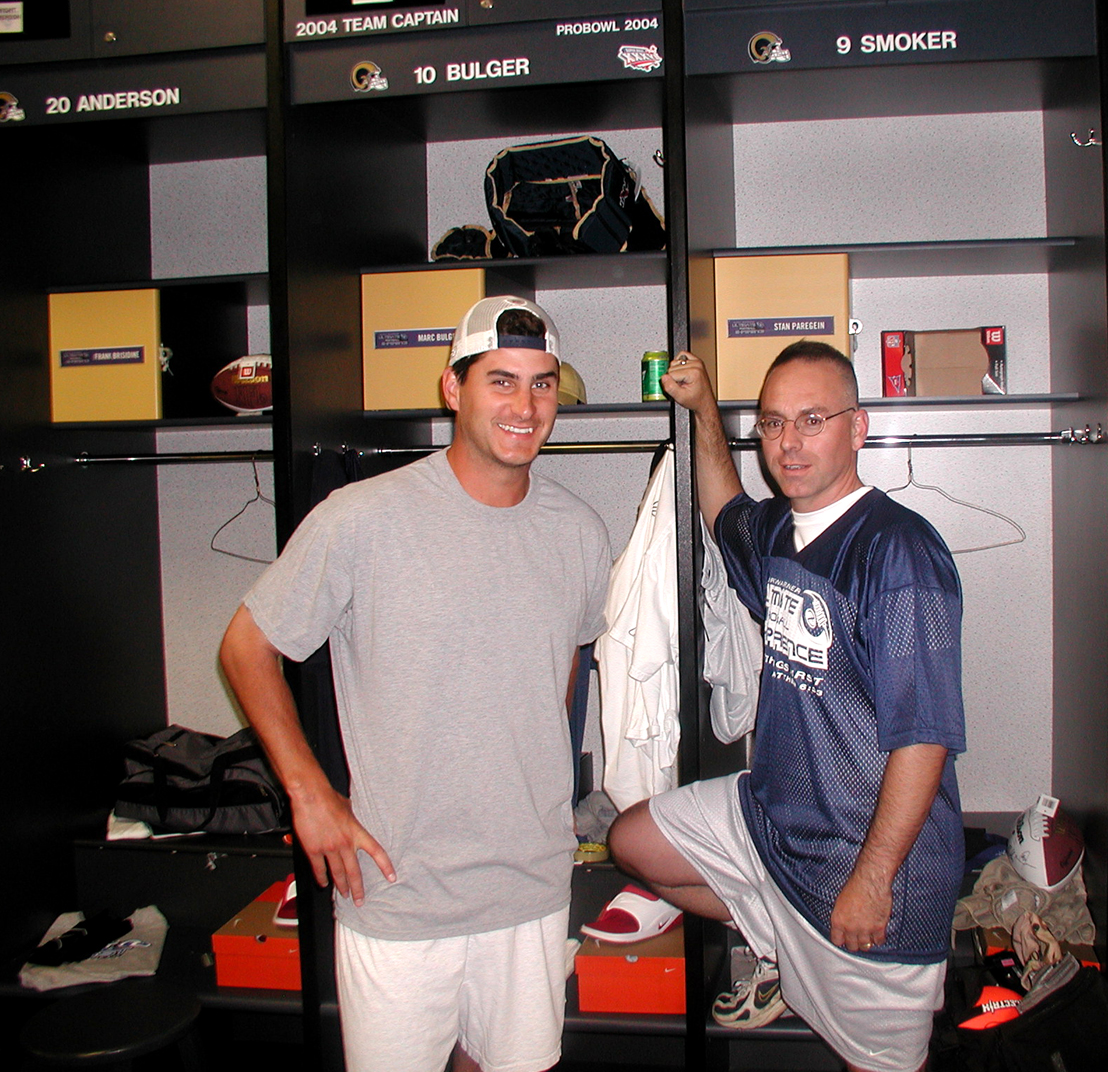
Bulger with a fan in October 2004

Bulger's performance in 2003 solidified his position as the Rams' starting quarterback. Warner was released in June 2004, and the Rams signed Bulger to a four-year, $19.1 million contract. The Rams went 8–8 in 2004, narrowly losing the division to the heavily favored Seattle Seahawks, but earned a wild-card berth in a mediocre NFC.

The Rams defeated Seattle for a third time in the wild-card round, but lost the following week at the hands of the Atlanta Falcons in the Divisional Round by a wide 17–47 margin.

==== 2005 ====
On October 17, against the Indianapolis Colts, Bulger injured his right shoulder. After missing two games, he returned to the field on November 20 against the Arizona Cardinals where he re-injured his shoulder. He was then placed on IR on Christmas Day. He finished the 2005 season with 14 touchdowns, nine interceptions and a 94.4 passer rating.

==== 2006 ====
On September 10, 2006, in a game against the Denver Broncos, Bulger reached 1,000 completions faster than any quarterback in NFL history. Bulger achieved this in 45 games, two games fewer than ex-Rams QB Kurt Warner. Drew Bledsoe and Peyton Manning needed 48 games, and it took Dan Marino 49.

==== 2007 ====
On July 28, 2007, Bulger signed a six-year, $62.5 million contract extension with the Rams, making him the highest-paid player in Rams history. The contract included $27 million in guaranteed money and put him in a group of six quarterbacks making $10 million a year or more. Bulger had one year remaining on a four-year, $19.1 million contract, which would have paid him $4 million in 2007. In the 2007 season, Bulger was plagued with injuries through the entire season as was the entire team. Injuries on the offensive line took effect as he threw more interceptions than touchdowns for the first time in his career. He was considered one of the biggest disappointments of the season, which saw the Rams slump to 3–13.

==== 2008 ====
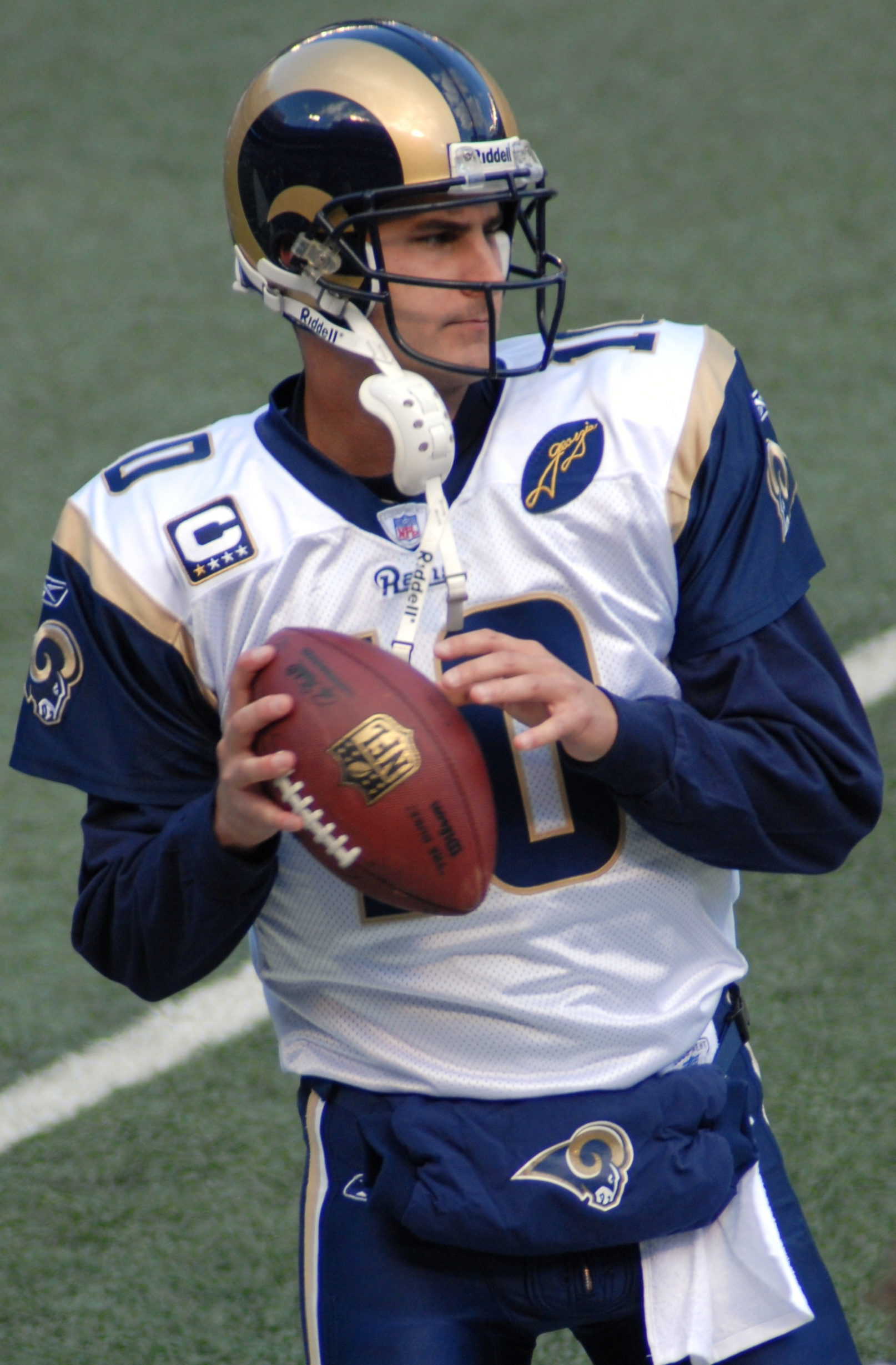
Bulger in November 2008

On September 23, 2008, after starting 0–3, Bulger lost his starting role to Trent Green. However, seven days later, new head coach Jim Haslett named Marc Bulger the starting quarterback for the rest of the season. On November 9, 2008, vs the Jets, Haslett replaced Bulger with Green after halftime after the Jets took a 40–0 lead in the first half, cued by four first half Rams turnovers.

A week later he was put back in as starting quarterback. His performances improved slightly as the year went on, but he still turned in another lackluster season with more interceptions than touchdowns and continuously declining completion percentages.

==== 2009 ====
Bulger was placed on season-ending injured reserve on December 26, 2009, as the Rams slumped to a franchise-worst 1–15 record, and a 6–42 record for the three seasons from 2007 to 2009. He had thrown just five touchdown passes during the 2009 season, although his statistics remained similar to 2007 and 2008, and his interception percentage had improved from 4 percent to 2.4 percent.

Bulger asked for, and was granted, his release by the Rams on April 5, 2010, his 33rd birthday.

=== Baltimore Ravens ===
On June 23, 2010, Bulger reached an agreement with the Baltimore Ravens on a one-year, $3.8 million deal that also had the possibility of increasing to $5.8 million through incentives. However, Bulger spent the entire season backing up Joe Flacco and never played a single snap.

=== Retirement ===
Although several teams were interested in signing him, Bulger announced his retirement from football on August 2, 2011.

== Career statistics ==
Legend
	Led the league
**Bold**	Career high

=== NFL ===
Year	Team	Games			Passing								Sacks	
Year	Team	GP	GS	Record	Comp	Att	Pct	Yards	Avg	TD	Int	Rate	Sck	SckY
2001	STL	0	0	–	DNP									
2002	STL	7	7	6–1	138	214	64.5	1,826	**8.5**	14	6	**101.5**	12	102
2003	STL	15	15	**12–3**	336	532	63.2	3,845	7.2	22	**22**	81.4	37	288
2004	STL	14	14	8–6	321	485	66.2	3,964	8.2	21	14	93.7	41	302
2005	STL	8	8	2–6	192	287	**66.9**	2,297	8.0	14	9	94.4	26	188
2006	STL	16	16	8–8	**370**	**558**	62.9	**4,301**	7.3	**24**	8	92.9	**49**	**366**
2007	STL	12	12	2–10	221	378	58.5	2,392	6.3	11	15	70.3	37	269
2008	STL	15	15	2–13	251	440	57.0	2,720	6.2	11	13	71.4	38	263
2009	STL	9	8	1–7	140	247	56.7	1,469	5.9	5	6	70.7	14	85
2010	BAL	0	0	–	DNP									
Total		96	95	41–54	1,969	3,171	62.1	22,814	7.2	122	93	84.4	254	1,863

=== College ===
Season	Team	GP	Passing								Rushing			
Season	Team	GP	Comp	Att	Pct	Yds	Y/A	TD	Int	Rtg	Att	Yds	Avg	TD
1996	West Virginia	6	19	42	45.2	352	8.4	3	1	134.4	3	-17	-5.7	0
1997	West Virginia	12	192	323	59.4	2,465	7.6	14	10	131.7	**52**	-93	-1.8	**2**
1998	West Virginia	12	**274**	**419**	**65.4**	**3,607**	**8.6**	**31**	10	**157.3**	33	-92	-2.8	0
1999	West Virginia	8	145	239	60.7	1,729	7.2	11	**13**	125.7	19	**-124**	**-6.5**	0
Total		38	630	1,023	61.6	8,153	8.0	59	34	140.9	107	-326	-3.0	2

== Personal life ==
Bulger was born in Pittsburgh, Pennsylvania and graduated from Sacred Heart Middle School and Central Catholic High School in Pittsburgh. He comes from a family of collegiate athletes. His father, Jim, was a quarterback for Notre Dame from 1970 to 1973. His brother Jim was on the Notre Dame golf team, sister Kate was selected into the WNBA, and youngest sister Meg was a standout guard for his alma mater, West Virginia. Bulger married Mavis Armbruster and has two daughters. His mother is of Irish descent. As of 2017, he now lives in Brentwood, Tennessee.

Since retirement, Bulger has picked up the sport of curling. He played in the 2018 Curl Mesabi Classic, which is an event of the World Curling Tour. He threw lead rocks for the John Benton team, which included fellow former football player Jared Allen.
