= Brian Leonard =

American football player (born 1984)

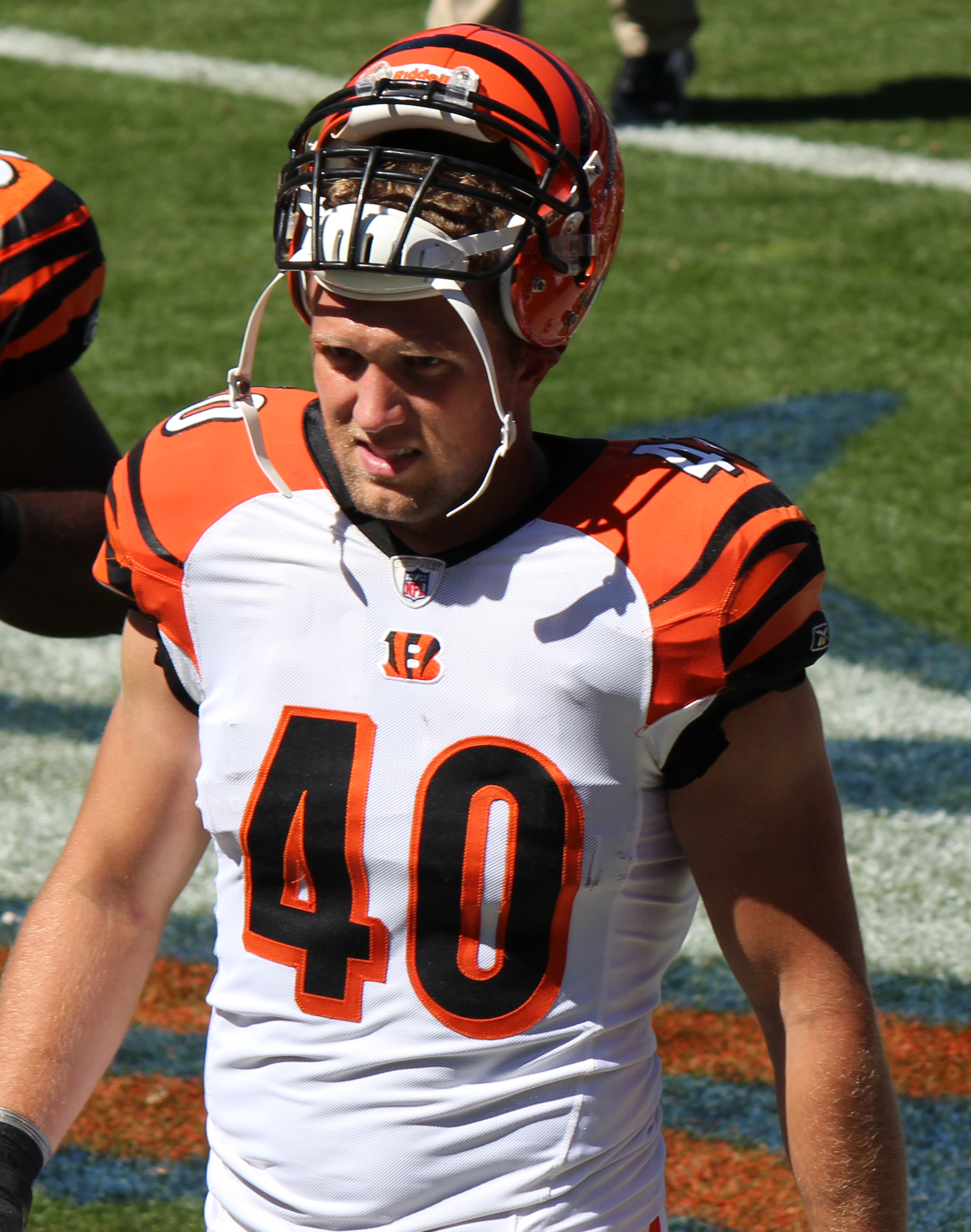
- Leonard with the Cincinnati Bengals in 2011

No. 23, 40, 30
- Position: Fullback

Personal information
- Born: February 3, 1984 (age 42); Gouverneur, New York, U.S.
- Listed height: 6 ft 1 in (1.85 m)
- Listed weight: 230 lb (104 kg)

Career information
- High school: Gouverneur
- College: Rutgers (2003–2006)
- NFL draft: 2007: 2nd round, 52nd overall pick

Career history
- St. Louis Rams (2007–2008); Cincinnati Bengals (2009–2012); Tampa Bay Buccaneers (2013); New Orleans Saints (2014)

Awards and highlights
- NFF Draddy Trophy (2006); Freshman All-American (2003); 2× First-team All-Big East (2004, 2005)

Career NFL statistics
- Rushing yards: 828
- Rushing average: 3.7
- Receptions: 142
- Receiving yards: 1,008
- Receiving touchdowns: 1
- Stats at Pro Football Reference

Brian Leonard (born February 3, 1984) is an American former professional football player who was a fullback in the National Football League (NFL).He played college football for the Rutgers Scarlet Knights and was selected by the St. Louis Rams in the second round of the 2007 NFL draft.

Leonard also played for the Cincinnati Bengals, Tampa Bay Buccaneers, and New Orleans Saints.

== College career ==
Leonard committed to play football at Rutgers University in August 2001. As a high school senior he was a 3-star (out of 5) recruit, according to Rivals.com, and had scholarship offers from several prominent schools including Penn State University and Syracuse University. In track & field, Leonard competed in the 100- and 200-meter dashes and the long jump. He posted impressive wins in both the 100 and 200 at the Section VII/X Track and Field Championships. Leonard was a four-time honor roll student. In high school, he was projected to play linebacker at the next level. Leonard largely credits his brother, Nate Leonard, for why he chose Rutgers.

Nate was also recruited to play football in college before injuring his knee. Unlike other Big East and ACC teams who stopped recruiting him as a collegiate football player due to his injury, Rutgers then-coach Terry Shea honored his scholarship offer to the elder Leonard brother, and Nate Leonard came to Rutgers to play football. Brian valued Rutgers's loyalty to his brother and ultimately decided to play football at Rutgers.

Beginning in his sophomore campaign, Leonard became known nationally for hurdling over would-be tacklers. During the opening game of the 2005 campaign in Urbana-Champaign against Illinois, he brought himself to the attention of sportscasters and pundits in the third quarter, taking a pitch from quarterback Ryan Hart on a 2nd down and 4 play from Rutgers's 17 yard line. Running left, Leonard hurdled over the top of a waiting linebacker at the 24 yard line and ran 83 yards for a touchdown in an ultimately losing effort against the Illini. The play was named the top college football highlight of that season's opening weekend by ESPN. In 2006, he was promoted as a Heisman Trophy candidate. A video clip of Leonard, concluding with the slogan "Leonard for Heisman," was aired on the NBC Astrovision screen in New York City’s Times Square. Despite being acknowledged as a Heisman candidate, Leonard elected to take on a diminished role as a blocker and allow Ray Rice to become a star. He was also named starting fullback on the 2007 Senior Bowl North Squad, where he finished with 16 yards rushing and 13 yards receiving, 3rd overall on the team in total yardage.

"He's a very, very, very, very, very underrated player...he's the best running back I've played against since I've been in college." (This includes Kevin Jones, Julius Jones, and Darius Walker) "That combination of power and speed is amazing. Some of the runs he makes in the open field, he can cut like a tailback. He jumps over safeties when they try and cut him, but then he runs over linebackers and defensive linemen. His combination of power and speed just makes him the best at what he does."
- Former Pitt and former Washington Redskins LB H.B. Blades on Brian Leonard

He was renowned for his athleticism due to his size, hands, and speed. Leonard developed a signature move—jumping over would-be tacklers. Fans dubbed this move The Leonard Leap which helped many of his wins.

=== School records ===
Leonard finished his Rutgers' career ranked fourth all-time rushing yards (2,775), fourth all-time rushing touchdowns (32), sixth all-time receiving yards (1,864), first all-time receptions (207), tied for fourth all-time receiving touchdowns (13), second all-time all-purpose yards (4,639), first all-time combined touchdowns (45), and first all-time career points scored (272).

=== Awards ===
- 2006 National Football Foundation Draddy Trophy
- First-Team Pro Football Weekly All-American 2004
- First-Team Pro Football Weekly All-American 2005
- First-Team Pro Football Weekly, ESPN.com, and Scout.com All-American 2006
- First-Team All-Big East 2004 and 2005, Second-Team All-Big East 2006
- Freshman All-American 2003
- College Football News Big East Freshman of the Year 2003
- 2006 ARA Sportsmanship Award

He graduated with a degree in labor studies.

== Professional career ==
=== Pre-draft ===
As an NFL prospect, Leonard was targeted by almost every draft expert and website to be the top fullback (as well as one of the higher-ranked halfbacks) and most likely would be playing a hybrid halfback / fullback / H-Back position in the pros. Leonard was projected as a day one selection, as high as the first round. At the 2007 NFL Combine Leonard was timed at 4.49 in the 40-yard dash, which is exceptionally fast for a fullback and above average for a running back; also, he bench pressed 225 lbs 28 times (most of any running back). NFL Network's Mike Mayock had Leonard ranked as the #4 running back in the draft. SportingNews said Leonard that he was "misused as a traditional fullback... would prosper in a one-back set..."

Pre-draft measurables
Height	Weight	40-yard dash	10-yard split	20-yard split	20-yard shuttle	Three-cone drill	Vertical jump	Broad jump	Bench press
6 ft 1 1/2 in (1.87 m)	226 lb (103 kg)	4.49 s	1.54 s	2.60 s	4.22 s	6.88 s	34 1/2 in (0.88 m)	10 ft 2 in (3.10 m)	28 reps
All values from NFL Combine.

=== St. Louis Rams ===
On April 28, 2007, Leonard was selected by the St. Louis Rams in the second round with the 52nd overall pick of the 2007 NFL draft. He signed a four-year, $2.8 million contract on July 24, 2007, that included $1.55 million in guaranteed money. Coach Scott Linehan decided to use Leonard as a fullback, running back, and a special third-down back, in relief of Steven Jackson. Linehan also stated that Leonard would see 15-20 snaps per game. In rookie training camp, Leonard was one of only two running backs, the other being Brad Lau. “We only have two backs right now so I am running in single back and halfback so I will be the running back unless we get another running back in here,” Leonard said. “It’s nice to get the reps, but it is tiring.” Leonard ran for the Rams' first touchdown of the year against the Minnesota Vikings in preseason on August 10, 2007. He had his first 100-yard rushing game, typically a milestone among running backs, on October 7, 2007, at home against the Arizona Cardinals.

Leonard underwent surgery on both his shoulders after the season.

=== Cincinnati Bengals ===
Leonard was traded to the Cincinnati Bengals on May 7, 2009, for defensive tackle Orien Harris. His struggle for a roster spot was chronicled in the HBO series Hard Knocks with several parts focusing on the battle between Leonard and DeDe Dorsey for the final running back spot.

Over the course of 2009 season, Leonard didn't see much rushing action because the team was using Cedric Benson as their primary running back and also signed Larry Johnson, limiting the number of Leonard's rushing attempts. However, he was often targeted on third- and fourth down passing plays and made several key conversions for the Bengals. For example, on September 27 in a game against the defending Super Bowl Champions Pittsburgh Steelers, Leonard caught a pass from Carson Palmer on 4th down, converting for the first down with 31 seconds left, extending the eventual winning drive. On December 27, he recorded an eight-yard reception in a 3rd-and-7 situation to keep what would eventually be the game-winning drive against the Kansas City Chiefs alive.

=== Tampa Bay Buccaneers ===
On April 1, 2013, the Tampa Bay Buccaneers signed Leonard, reuniting him with his former head coach at Rutgers, Greg Schiano.

=== New Orleans Saints ===
Leonard was brought in by multiple teams during training camp in 2014, but failed to secure a roster spot. Eventually, he signed with the New Orleans Saints on November 12, 2014, but was released one week later.

== Personal life ==
Leonard has been active in the community, especially doing considerable work with children. In 2006, Peter King wrote an article in Sports Illustrated selecting Leonard as his personal candidate for Sportsman of the Year, due to Leonard's on- and off-field accomplishments. Leonard currently resides in Morristown, New Jersey.

Since its inception in 2009, the Brian Leonard Football Camp has brought young football players together with skilled coaches and NFL pros to provide a learning experience to improve participant play and provide recruitment opportunities. The annual camp is held at Sandstoner Park, in Potsdam, New York, which is close to Brian's hometown of Gouverneur.
