= Eastern Guilford High School =

American secondary school in North Carolina

Location
- 415 Peeden Drive; Gibsonville, North Carolina 27249; United States; 36°05′36″N 79°36′56″W

Information
- Motto: "We Are Family"
- Established: 1974 (52 years ago)
- School district: Guilford County Schools
- CEEB code: 341475
- Principal: Darrell Harris
- Teaching staff: 75.39 (FTE)
- Grades: 9–12
- Enrollment: 1,228 (2023–2024)
- Student to teacher ratio: 16.29
- Schedule type: Block
- Colors: Blue and gold
- Mascot: Wildcat
- Website: gcsnc.com/eastern_guilford_high

Eastern Guilford High School is a secondary school located in Gibsonville, North Carolina. The school opened in 1974. Today, it serves Grades 9 through 12, with an enrollment of 1,228 students.

== Fire ==
On November 1, 2006 at approximately 2:08 PM, a fire broke out in a rear chemistry lab office on the second floor of the building. The fire spread throughout the school via the cockloft above the classrooms due to the lack of sprinklers or firewalls. All of the students were evacuated and there were no injuries; however, parts of the school were destroyed and the building had to be demolished due to safety concerns. On December 7, 2006, it was reported that the cause of the fire was ruled as arson, and a $7,000 reward was being offered for information leading to the arrest of the person or persons responsible for setting the fire. The Guilford County Sheriff's Department have spoken with "people of interest" who they believe may have been involved with the arson. On November 8, 2006, seniors and juniors resumed their classes at Guilford Technical Community College's Greensboro campus. Shortly thereafter, on November 14, 2006, sophomores and freshmen resumed classes at the vacant Central North Carolina School for the Deaf campus. Students would finish out the school year at their respective campuses.

== New school construction ==
The students of Eastern Guilford were attending classes at a "pod village" during construction of the new and current Eastern Guilford High School facility. The school is of the same architectural design as the recently constructed Northern Guilford High School, and was designed to accommodate approximately 1,200 students, with a core capacity of up to 1,600. The original estimated date of completion was January 2009, but construction was not completed until April 2009. Students began attending classes in the new building when they returned from spring break.

== Notable alumni ==
- Terrence Holt — former NFL safety and younger brother of Torry Holt
- Torry Holt — former NFL wide receiver, 7x Pro Bowl selection and Super Bowl XXXIV champion with the St. Louis Rams
