= Dustin Fry =

American football player and coach (born 1983)

Current position
- Title: Head Coach
- Team: Polk County Wolverines

Biographical details
- Born: October 3, 1983 (age 43); Summerville, South Carolina, U.S.

Playing career
- 2002–2006: Clemson
- 2007–2008: St. Louis Rams
- 2008–2009: Cleveland Browns
- 2009: Carolina Panthers
- 2010: Denver Broncos
- Position: Center

Coaching career (HC unless noted)
- 2012–2014: Clemson (GA)
- 2015–2017: SMU (OL)
- 2018–2019: Arkansas (OL)

Accomplishments and honors

Awards
- Second-team All-ACC (2006)

Dustin W. Fry (born October 3, 1983) is an American former professional football player who was a center in the National Football League (NFL). He played college football for the Clemson Tigers and was selected by the St. Louis Rams in the fifth round of the 2007 NFL draft.

Fry was also a member of the Cleveland Browns, Carolina Panthers and Denver Broncos. After his playing career, he was an offensive line coach for Arkansas Razorbacks and SMU Mustangs.

== College career ==
Fry played college football for the Clemson Tigers where he played in 47 games, starting 36, registering 171 knockdown blocks on 2,192 plays. He was a sports management major.

== Professional career ==
=== Pre-draft ===
Fry pulled a muscle during the NFL combine and did not attempt the agility drills, however, he bench pressed 225 pounds 34 times and ran a 5.28 forty-yard dash.

=== St. Louis Rams ===
Fry was selected by the St. Louis Rams in the fifth round (139th overall) of the 2007 NFL Draft. In his rookie season he played in four games and made his NFL debut at the Cincinnati Bengals on December 9.

Fry was released from the Rams' practice squad on October 28, 2008, to make room for offensive tackle Jason Capizzi.

=== Cleveland Browns ===
Fry was signed to the practice squad of the Cleveland Browns on November 5, 2008. After finishing the season on the practice squad, he was re-signed to a future contract on January 7, 2009. He was waived during final cuts on September 5.

=== Carolina Panthers ===
Fry was signed to the practice squad of the Carolina Panthers on September 6, 2009.

=== Denver Broncos ===
Fry signed a future contract with the Denver Broncos on January 7, 2010.

On August 18, 2010, he was waived by the Broncos.
