= Ken Shackleford =

American football player (born 1985)

No. 79
- Position: Offensive tackle

Personal information
- Born: February 20, 1985 (age 41); Villa Rica, Georgia, U.S.
- Listed height: 6 ft 5 in (1.96 m)
- Listed weight: 366 lb (166 kg)

Career information
- High school: Villa Rica (GA)
- College: Georgia
- NFL draft: 2007: 6th round, 190th overall pick

Career history
- St. Louis Rams (2007)*; Kansas City Chiefs (2008)*; West Texas Roughnecks (2010); Cleveland Gladiators (2012)*; Orlando Predators (2013)*
- * Offseason or practice squad member only
- Stats at ArenaFan.com

Kendrick Shackleford (born February 20, 1985) is an American former football offensive tackle. He was selected by the St. Louis Rams with the 190th overall pick in the sixth round of the 2007 NFL draft, but released prior to the start of the season. He played college football at Georgia.

== Professional career ==
Pre-draft measurables
| Height | Weight | 40-yard dash | 10-yard split | 20-yard split | 20-yard shuttle | Three-cone drill | Vertical jump | Broad jump | Bench press |
|---|---|---|---|---|---|---|---|---|---|
| 6 ft 4 7/8 in (1.95 m) | 322 lb (146 kg) | 5.30 s | 1.87 s | 3.03 s | 5.05 s | 8.35 s | 24 1/2 in (0.62 m) | 8 ft 6 in (2.59 m) | 28 reps |
All from NFL Combine.
