= Brad Lau =

Brad Lau, better known by his pseudonym LadyIronChef, is a Singaporean online personality and food writer. He is the chief editor and founder of the food and travel website, ladyironchef.com, which is among the leading food and travel websites in Singapore".

== Career ==
Lau founded the food and travel blog, ladyironchef.com, in 2007. According to the website, the name "ladyironchef" has no proper etymology. However, there is a Hong Kong produced Cantonese language film with a title that translates to The Lady Iron Chef which was also released in 2007. The ladyironchef.com website was viewed about 1.5 million times in December 2012. Time Out described Lau as "one of Singapore’s most prolific food bloggers".

== Controversy ==
On 9 August 2010, Lau was reported to have not paid the bill after dining at a restaurant. Many articles started floating around the internet then. Lau was eventually proven guilty and he confessed that everyone should be more careful with such media tasting invitations moving forward.
