= 2010 Chicago Bears season =

NFL team season

- Owner: The McCaskey Family
- General manager: Jerry Angelo
- Head coach: Lovie Smith
- Offensive coordinator: Mike Martz
- Defensive coordinator: Rod Marinelli
- Home stadium: Soldier Field

Results
- Record: 11–5
- Division place: 1st NFC North
- Playoffs: Won Divisional Playoffs (vs. Seahawks) 35–24; Lost NFC Championship (vs. Packers) 14–21
- All-Pros: DE Julius Peppers; KR Devin Hester; LB Brian Urlacher (2nd team); S Chris Harris (2nd team)
- Pro Bowlers: DE Julius Peppers; OLB Lance Briggs; MLB Brian Urlacher; PR/KR Devin Hester

Uniform
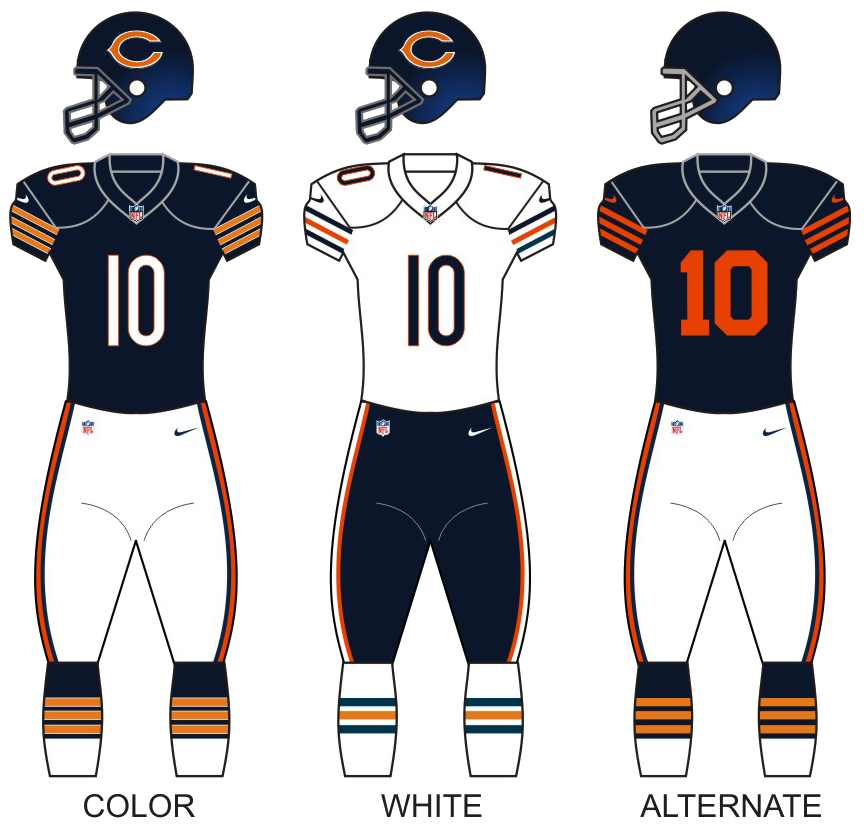

The 2010 season was the Chicago Bears' 91st in the National Football League (NFL) and their seventh under head coach Lovie Smith.

Coming off a 7–9 record in the 2009 season and failing to qualify for the NFL playoffs for a third consecutive season, the Bears sought to develop their roster and improve on their record in 2010, particularly their standing in the NFC North. All Bears home games were scheduled to be played at Soldier Field. With their final regular season record at 11–5, the Bears improved drastically on their 2009 record. Their regular season finished with their first playoff appearance since the Super Bowl season of 2006, winning the NFC North division and earning a bye as the NFC's second seed. The Bears won their first game in the Divisional round of the playoffs, defeating the Seattle Seahawks, to advance to the NFC Championship game. However, their season came to an end with a 21–14 loss to their longtime rivals and eventual Super Bowl champion Green Bay Packers.

This was the last time the Bears won the NFC North and appeared in the postseason until 2018. This was also the most recent season in which the Bears had won a playoff game until 2025, when they defeated Green Bay in the Wild Card round.

== Offseason ==
=== Coaching changes ===
On January 5, 2010, Chicago fired offensive coordinator Ron Turner as well as position coaches Pep Hamilton (quarterbacks), Rob Boras (tight ends), and Harry Hiestand (offensive line). Quality control assistants Luke Butkus and Charles London did not have their respective contracts renewed. While it's unclear whether or not former defensive coordinator Bob Babich will be brought back as a linebackers coach or released, his contract will not be extended under its current terms.

Former Minnesota Vikings head coach Mike Tice was selected to succeed Hiestand as the Bears' offensive line coach on January 15.

After nearly a month-long search for Turner's replacement, on February 1, 2010, former St. Louis Rams head coach Mike Martz was hired to the Chicago coaching staff as offensive coordinator.

Following the Martz hire, Mike DeBord, former college head coach and Seattle Seahawks position coach, as a tight ends coach.

With the addition of Martz and DeBord in the offseason, the amount of experience on the staff grew. These two offseason acquisitions joined defensive line coach (and former Detroit Lions head coach), Rod Marinelli.

In a series of moves finalizing their 2010 coaching roster, the Bears hired former San Francisco 49ers quarterbacks coach Shane Day (an assistant to Mike Martz during his tenure in San Francisco) and quality control coaches Andrew Hayes-Stoker and Mikal Smith, assigned to the offense and defense, respectively. Defensive line coach Rod Marinelli was promoted to defensive coordinator and his assistant, Eric Washington, was promoted to the vacated position.

On April 27, 2010, the Bears allowed the contract of director of college scouting, Greg Gabriel, a member of the Bears scouting staff since 2001, to expire. There has been no announcement regarding who will succeed him.

In a long anticipated move, on April 30, the Bears welcomed former Seattle Seahawks officer Tim Ruskell to assume the post of director of pro personnel at Halas Hall.

=== 2010 NFL draft ===
==== Draft pick trades ====
- In 2009, Chicago traded their second round pick to the Tampa Bay Buccaneers for Gaines Adams.
- In 2009, the Bears traded their 2010 first round pick (along with 2009 NFL draft selections and quarterback Kyle Orton) to the Denver Broncos for quarterback Jay Cutler.

==== 2010 Chicago Bears draft choices ====
**2010 Chicago Bears draft**
Round	Pick	Player	Position	College	Notes
3	75	Major Wright	Safety	Florida	
4	109	Corey Wootton	Defensive end	Northwestern	
5	140	Joshua Moore	Cornerback	Kansas State	
6	181	Dan LeFevour	Quarterback	Central Michigan	
7	218	J'Marcus Webb	Offensive tackle	West Texas A&M	
Made roster

=== Undrafted free agents ===
Name	Position	College
Freddie Barnes	Wide receiver	Bowling Green
Cornelius Brown	Cornerback	UTEP
Vic Hall	Wide receiver	Virginia
Levi Horn	Tackle	Montana
Greg Matthews	Wide receiver	Michigan
Matt Mayberry	Linebacker	Indiana
Brandon Minor	Running back	Michigan
Antonio Robinson	Wide receiver	Nicholls State
Jimmy Saddler-McQueen	Defensive tackle	Texas A&M–Kingsville
Quentin Scott	Safety	Northern Iowa
Averell Spicer	Defensive tackle	USC
Barry Turner	Defensive end	Nebraska
Vince Vance	Guard	Georgia
Tim Walter	Center	Colorado State

=== Training Camp ===
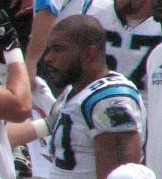
The Bears made a splash in free agency by signing Julius Peppers (pictured), Chester Taylor, and Brandon Manumaleuna.

The Bears announced in April that the first Training Camp session will be held on July 30, 2010, at Olivet Nazarene University in Bourbonnais. This is preceded by the official Rookie Mini-Camp which traditionally is held the weekend following the NFL Draft at Halas Hall, this year beginning on April 30.

==== Rookie Mini-Camp ====
A total of 54 players were listed on the roster sheet for the Chicago Bears' April 30 – May 3 Rookie Mini-Camp at Halas Hall. In addition to the five drafted rookies and the 13 rookie signees, the Bears invited 31 undrafted free agents to participate on a try-out basis.

Chicago Bears 2010 Rookie Mini-Camp Roster
**Quarterbacks**: 15 **Dan LeFevour**; -- Juice Williams; **Running backs**: -- Shamar Graves FB; 39 Brandon Minor; -- Jake Sharp; **Wide receivers**: 83 Freddie Barnes; -- Justin Buckhalter; 84 Vic Hall; -- Zeke Markshausen; 16 Greg Mathews; -- Nick Merchut; 18 Antonio Robinson; -- Steven Turner	**Tight ends**: -- Craig Carey; **Offensive linemen**: -- Dennis Conley G; 79 Levi Horn T; -- Austin Steichen C; -- Vince Vance G; 64 Tim Walter C; 73 **J'Marcus Webb** T; **Defensive linemen**: -- Brian Coulter DE; -- Kyle Harrington DT; 73 Jimmy Saddler-McQueen DT; -- Averell Spicer DT; 96 Barry Turner DE; 94 Lawrence Wilson DE; 98 **Corey Wootton** DE	**Linebackers**: -- Malcolm Arrington; -- Chris Johnson; 52 Kevin Malast* ILB; 64 Matt Mayberry OLB; -- Damaso Munoz; -- Blaze Soares; **Defensive backs**: 39 Cornelius Brown CB; -- Ryan McFoy S; -- Raeshon McNeil CB; 31 **Josh Moore** CB; -- Cam Nelson S; -- Wopamo Osaisai CB; -- Roderick Rollins CB; 37 Quentin Scott SS; 47 Woodny Turenne* CB; -- Justin Woodall S; 27 **Major Wright** FS	**Special teams**: -- Will Batson P; -- Desi Cullen P; -- Tom Harrington LS; -- Thomas Mante K; -- Andrew Pitz LS; -- Mike Salerno K; -- Chase Turner P; Drafted players in bold Undrafted signees in italics Non-Rookie Participants marked with asterisks (*) 54 Total, 5 Drafted, 13 Signed, 31 Unsigned

=== Summary of offseason roster changes ===
Chicago Bears 2010 Offseason Roster Changes
**Departures**: Gaines Adams DE – Died of cardiac arrest; Brett Basanez QB – Released; Alex Brown DE – Released; Dusty Dvoracek DT – Unsigned RFA; Marcus Freeman OLB – Waived; Kevin Jones RB – Released; Fontel Mines TE – Waived; Darrell McClover OLB – Unsigned UFA; Adewale Ogunleye DE – Unsigned UFA; Orlando Pace OT – Waived; Kevin Payne FS – Traded to St. Louis; Adrian Peterson RB – Unsigned UFA; Tyler Reed OG – Waived; Nathan Vasher CB – Released; Jamar Williams OLB – Traded to Carolina	**Resigned Free Agents**; Unrestricted Free Agents: Pisa Tinoisamoa OLB; Restricted Free Agents: Josh Bullocks SS; Nick Roach OLB; Exclusive-Rights FAs: Kahlil Bell RB; Tim Shaw ILB; Matt Toeaina DT	**Undrafted Free Agents**: Freddie Barnes WR; Cornelius Brown CB; Vic Hall WR; Levi Horn OT; Greg Matthews WR; Matt Mayberry LB; Jimmy Saddler-McQueen DT; Brandon Minor RB; Antonio Robinson WR; Quentin Scott S; Averell Spicer DT; Barry Turner DE; Tim Walter C; Lawrence Wilson DE	**2010 NFL Draft Additions**: Major Wright S; Corey Wootton DE; Joshua Moore CB; Dan LeFevour QB; J'Marcus Webb OT; **Free Agency Additions**: Tim Jennings CB (Indianapolis); Brandon Manumaleuna TE (San Diego); Julius Peppers DE (Carolina); Chester Taylor RB (Minnesota); Eddie Williams FB (Washington); **Acquired via Trade**: Chris Harris S (reacquired from Carolina); Rookies in italics Roster updated April 24, 2010; Depth Chart • Transactions; 15 Departures, 25 Additions, 8 Resigned Players; 10 Net Additions

== Final roster ==
2010 Chicago Bears roster
Quarterbacks (QB): 10 Todd Collins; 6 Jay Cutler; 12 Caleb Hanie; Running backs (RB): 32 Kahlil Bell; 22 Matt Forte; 29 Chester Taylor; 25 Garrett Wolfe; Wide receivers (WR): 19 Devin Aromashodu; 80 Earl Bennett; 81 Rashied Davis; 23 Devin Hester PR; 13 Johnny Knox; Tight ends (TE): 88 Desmond Clark; 87 Kellen Davis; 86 Brandon Manumaleuna; 82 Greg Olsen	Offensive linemen (OL): 63 Roberto Garza G/C; 67 Herman Johnson T/G; 57 Olin Kreutz C; 60 Lance Louis G; 68 Frank Omiyale T; 78 Kevin Shaffer T; 73 J'Marcus Webb T; 74 Chris Williams G/T; 70 Edwin Williams G; Defensive linemen (DL): 95 Anthony Adams DT; 91 Tommie Harris DT; 99 Marcus Harrison DT; 71 Israel Idonije DE; 69 Henry Melton DE; 90 Julius Peppers DE; 75 Matt Toeaina DT; 98 Corey Wootton DE	Linebackers (LB): 55 Lance Briggs OLB; 52 Brian Iwuh OLB; 53 Nick Roach OLB; 59 Pisa Tinoisamoa OLB; 54 Brian Urlacher MLB; 58 Rod Wilson OLB; Defensive backs (DB): 35 Zack Bowman CB; 36 Josh Bullocks SS; 21 Corey Graham CB; 46 Chris Harris FS; 26 Tim Jennings CB; 38 Danieal Manning; 30 D. J. Moore CB; 31 Joshua Moore CB; 20 Craig Steltz FS; 33 Charles Tillman CB; 27 Major Wright FS; Special teams (ST): 9 Robbie Gould K; 65 Patrick Mannelly LS; 4 Brad Maynard P	Practice squad: 62 Johan Asiata G; 94 Ervin Baldwin DE; 24 K. J. Gerard CB; 11 Rashaun Greer WR; 79 Levi Horn T; 17 Juaquin Iglesias WR; 93 Chris Johnson LB; 43 Eddie Williams FB; Reserve: 92 Hunter Hillenmeyer MLB (IR); 48 Harvey Unga RB (IR); Rookies in italics 53 active, 2 reserve, 8 practice squad

== Staff ==
Chicago Bears 2010 staff
Front office: Secretary of the board of directors – Virginia Halas McCaskey; Chairman – Michael McCaskey; Vice chairman – George McCaskey; President/CEO – Ted Phillips; General manager – Jerry Angelo; Director of player personnel – Tim Ruskell; Senior director of football administration/general counsel – Cliff Stein; Assistant director of pro personnel – Kevin Turks; Area scout – Chris Ballard; Area scout – Marty Barrett; Area scout – Rex Hogan; Area scout – Mark Sadowski; Head coaches: Head coach – Lovie Smith; Assistant head coach/defensive coordinator – Rod Marinelli; Offensive coaches: Offensive coordinator – Mike Martz; Quarterbacks – Shane Day; Running backs – Tim Spencer; Wide receivers – Darryl Drake; Tight ends – Mike DeBord; Offensive line – Mike Tice; Offensive quality control – Andrew Hayes-Stoker	Defensive coaches: Defensive line – Eric Washington; Linebackers – Bob Babich; Defensive backs – Jon Hoke; Assistant Defensive Backs (Safeties) – Gill Byrd; Defensive quality control – Mikal Smith; Special teams coaches: Special teams coordinator – Dave Toub; Assistant special teams – Chris Tabor; Strength and conditioning: Director of physical development – Rusty Jones; Strength and conditioning – Jim Arthur

== Schedule ==
=== Preseason ===
The Bears preseason schedule was announced on March 31, 2010.

Week	Date	Kickoff	Opponent	Results		Game site	TV	NFL.com recap
Week	Date	Kickoff	Opponent	Final score	Team record	Game site	TV	NFL.com recap
1	August 14	8:00 p.m.	at San Diego Chargers	**L** 10–25	0–1	Qualcomm Stadium		Recap
2	August 21	7:30 p.m.	Oakland Raiders	**L** 17–32	0–2	Soldier Field		Recap
3	August 28	7:30 p.m.	Arizona Cardinals	**L** 9–14	0–3	Soldier Field		Recap
4	September 2	7:00 p.m.	at Cleveland Browns	**L** 10–13	0–4	Cleveland Browns Stadium		Recap

=== Regular season ===
Week	Date	Kickoff	Opponent	Results		Game site	TV	NFL.com recap
Week	Date	Kickoff	Opponent	Final score	Team record	Game site	TV	NFL.com recap
1	September 12	12:00 p.m.	**Detroit Lions**	**W** 19–14	1–0	Soldier Field	Fox	Recap
2	September 19	12:00 p.m.	at Dallas Cowboys	**W** 27–20	2–0	Cowboys Stadium	Fox	Recap
3	September 27	7:30 p.m.	**Green Bay Packers**	**W** 20–17	3–0	Soldier Field	ESPN	Recap
4	October 3	7:30 p.m.	at New York Giants	**L** 3–17	3–1	New Meadowlands Stadium	NBC	Recap
5	October 10	12:00 p.m.	at Carolina Panthers	**W** 23–6	4–1	Bank of America Stadium	Fox	Recap
6	October 17	12:00 p.m.	Seattle Seahawks	**L** 20–23	4–2	Soldier Field	Fox	Recap
7	October 24	12:00 p.m.	Washington Redskins	**L** 14–17	4–3	Soldier Field	Fox	Recap
8	Bye							
9	November 7	12:00 p.m.	at Buffalo Bills	**W** 22–19	5–3	(Canada) Rogers Centre (Toronto)	Fox	Recap
10	November 14	12:00 p.m.	**Minnesota Vikings**	**W** 27–13	6–3	Soldier Field	Fox	Recap
11	November 18	7:20 p.m.	at Miami Dolphins	**W** 16–0	7–3	Sun Life Stadium	NFLN	Recap
12	November 28	3:15 p.m.	Philadelphia Eagles	**W** 31–26	8–3	Soldier Field	Fox	Recap
13	December 5	12:00 p.m.	at **Detroit Lions**	**W** 24–20	9–3	Ford Field	Fox	Recap
14	December 12	3:15 p.m.	New England Patriots	**L** 7–36	9–4	Soldier Field	CBS	Recap
15	December 20	7:30 p.m.	at **Minnesota Vikings**	**W** 40–14	10–4	TCF Bank Stadium**	ESPN	Recap
16	December 26	12:00 p.m.	New York Jets	**W** 38–34	11–4	Soldier Field	CBS	Recap
17	January 2	3:15 p.m.	at **Green Bay Packers**	**L** 3–10	11–5	Lambeau Field	Fox	Recap
Notes: All times are Central. Division opponents are in **bold** text. Color key: § The Bears were the visiting team in the Bills Toronto Series. # Games played with white uniforms. # Games played with color uniforms. # Games played with 1940s throwback uniforms. ** The game was moved from Mall of America Field to TCF Bank Stadium due to the collapse of the Metrodome roof.

== Standings ==
NFC North
	W	L	T	PCT	DIV	CONF	PF	PA	STK
^{(2)} Chicago Bears	11	5	0	.688	5–1	8–4	334	286	L1
^{(6)} Green Bay Packers	10	6	0	.625	4–2	8–4	388	240	W2
Detroit Lions	6	10	0	.375	2–4	5–7	362	369	W4
Minnesota Vikings	6	10	0	.375	1–5	5–7	281	348	L1

== Regular season ==
=== Week 1: vs. Detroit Lions ===
Week 1: Detroit Lions at Chicago Bears – Game summary

Quarter	1	2	3	4	Total
Lions	7	7	0	0	14
Bears	3	10	0	6	19

at Soldier Field, Chicago, Illinois

- Date: September 12
- Game time: 12:00 p.m. CDT
- Game weather: 77°F (Sunny)
- Game attendance: 62,080 (100.9% full)
- Referee: Gene Steratore
- TV announcers (Fox): Thom Brennaman, Brian Billick & Charissa Thompson
- Recap

Game information

First quarter

- CHI – Robbie Gould 20-yard field goal, Bears 3–0, Drive: 11 plays, 64 yards, 5:57.
- DET – Jahvid Best 7-yard run (Jason Hanson kick), Lions 7–3, Drive: 7 plays, 42 yards, 3:18.

Second quarter

- DET – Jahvid Best 4-yard run (Jason Hanson kick), Lions 14–3, Drive: 10 plays, 60 yards, 4:33.
- CHI – Matt Forte 89-yard pass from Jay Cutler (Robbie Gould kick), Lions 14–10, Drive: 1 plays, 79 yards, 0:27.
- CHI – Robbie Gould 31-yard field goal, Lions 14–13, Drive: 4 plays, 24 yards, 0:20.

Third quarter

- No scoring plays

Fourth quarter

- CHI – Matt Forte 28-yard pass from Jay Cutler (pass failed), Bears 19–14, Drive: 6 plays, 56 yards, 1:49.

Top passers

- DET – Shaun Hill – 9/19, 88 yards, 1 interception
- CHI – Jay Cutler – 23/35, 372 yards, 2 touchdowns, 1 interception

Top rushers

- DET – Jahvid Best – 14 rushes, 20 yards, 2 touchdowns
- CHI – Matt Forte – 17 rushes, 50 yards

Top receivers

- DET – Calvin Johnson – 4 receptions, 45 yards
- CHI – Matt Forte – 7 receptions, 151 yards, 2 touchdowns

Top tacklers

- DET – Kyle Vanden Bosch – 10 tackles, 1 assist
- CHI – Lance Briggs – 9 tackles, 1 assist, 1 forced fumble

The Bears kicked off their season at home with an NFC North duel against the Detroit Lions. In the first quarter, the Bears took the early lead with kicker Robbie Gould nailing a 20-yard field goal. The Lions responded with 2 TD runs (7 and 4 yards) by running back Jahvid Best in the second quarter. The Bears fought back with quarterback Jay Cutler completing an 89-yard screen pass to running back Matt Forté for a TD, followed by Gould's 31-yard field goal after a Stafford fumble. The Bears increased their lead in the fourth quarter when Cutler threw a 28-yard TD pass to Matt Forté. The Bears tried to extend their lead to 7, but failed on their 2-point conversion. The game ended in somewhat controversial fashion, however, as an apparent touchdown reception in the final minute by Detroit receiver Calvin Johnson was overturned via a little known rule (completing the process of a catch) and ruled incomplete.

With the win, Chicago began the season at 1–0.

=== Week 2: at Dallas Cowboys ===
Week 2: Chicago Bears at Dallas Cowboys – Game summary

Quarter	1	2	3	4	Total
Bears	10	10	0	7	27
Cowboys	7	7	3	3	20

at Cowboys Stadium, Arlington, Texas

- Date: September 19
- Game time: 1:00 PM EDT/12:00 PM CDT
- Game weather: Played indoors, retractable roof closed
- Game attendance: 85,168 (106.5% full)
- Referee: Scott Green
- TV announcers (Fox): Joe Buck, Troy Aikman, & Pam Oliver
- Recap

Game information

First quarter

- CHI – Robbie Gould 38-yard field goal, Bears 3–0, Drive: 4 plays, 3 yards, 2:37.
- DAL – Dez Bryant 62-yard punt return (David Buehler kick), Cowboys 7–3.
- CHI – Greg Olsen 39-yard pass from Jay Cutler (Robbie Gould kick), Bears 10–7, Drive: 3 plays, 58 yards, 1:35.

Second quarter

- DAL – Chris Gronkowski 1-yard pass from Tony Romo (David Buehler kick), Cowboys 14–10, Drive: 13 plays, 73 yards, 7:53.
- CHI – Devin Hester 9-yard pass from Jay Cutler (Robbie Gould kick), Bears 17–14, Drive: 6 plays, 74 yards, 4:38.
- CHI – Robbie Gould 40-yard field goal, Bears 20–14, Drive: 9 plays, 25 yards, 1:19.

Third quarter

- DAL – David Buehler 28-yard field goal, Bears 20–17, Drive: 8 plays, 56 yards, 4:24.

Fourth quarter

- CHI – Matt Forte 3-yard pass from Jay Cutler (Robbie Gould kick), Bears 27–17, Drive: 4 plays, 66 yards, 2:07.
- DAL – David Buehler 48-yard field goal, Bears 27–20, Drive: 8 plays, 50 yards, 1:28.

Top passers

- CHI – Jay Cutler – 21/29, 277 yards, 3 touchdowns
- DAL – Tony Romo – 3451, 374 yards, 1 touchdown, 2 interceptions

Top rushers

- CHI – Matt Forte – 10 rushes, 29 yards
- DAL – Marion Barber – 11 rushes, 31 yards

Top receivers

- CHI – Johnny Knox – 4 receptions, 86 yards
- DAL – Miles Austin – 10 receptions, 142 yards

Top tacklers

- CHI – Zack Bowman – 8 tackles, 2 assists
- DAL – Bradie James – 5 tackles, 1 assist

Hoping to continue their winning streak, the Bears flew to Cowboys Stadium for an NFC matchup with the Cowboys. In the first quarter Chicago took the early lead as kicker Robbie Gould nailed a 38-yard field goal. Then they trailed with WR Dez Bryant returning a punt 62 yards to the endzone for a touchdown. While the Cowboys were able to pressure quarterback Jay Cutler in the early stages of the game, the Bears' offense made adjustments and regained momentum. The Bears got the lead back when Cutler made a 39-yard TD pass to tight end Greg Olsen. In the second quarter the Bears trailed again when QB Tony Romo made a 1-yard touchdown pass to RB Chris Gronkowski, but took the lead with Cutler making a nine-yard TD pass to WR Devin Hester. The Bears increased their lead when kicker Robbie Gould made a 40-yard field goal. In the third quarter Dallas would reply with kicker David Buehler nailing a 28-yard field goal. The Bears increased their lead in the fourth quarter when Cutler made a three-yard TD pass to RB Matt Forte. The Cowboys made the final score of the game with Buehler hitting a 48-yard field goal.

With the win, Chicago improved to 2–0.

=== Week 3: vs. Green Bay Packers ===
Week 3: Green Bay Packers at Chicago Bears – Game summary

Quarter	1	2	3	4	Total
Packers	7	3	0	7	17
Bears	0	7	0	13	20

at Soldier Field, Chicago, Illinois

- Date: September 27
- Game time: 7:30 p.m. CDT
- Game weather: 55°F (Cloudy)
- Game attendance: 62,179 (100.1% full)
- Referee: Terry McAulay
- TV announcers (ESPN): Mike Tirico, Ron Jaworski, Jon Gruden, Suzy Kolber, & Michele Tafoya
- Recap

Game information

First quarter

- GB – Greg Jennings 7-yard pass from Aaron Rodgers (Mason Crosby kick), Packers 7–0, Drive: 6 plays, 60 yards, 3:56.

Second quarter

- GB – Mason Crosby 38-yard field goal, Packers 10–0, Drive: 14 plays, 73 yards, 7:47.
- CHI – Greg Olsen 9-yard pass from Jay Cutler (Robbie Gould kick), Packers 10–7, Drive: 4 plays, 44 yards, 1:24.

Third quarter

- No scoring plays

Fourth quarter

- CHI – Devin Hester 62-yard punt return (Robbie Gould kick), Bears 14–10.
- GB – Aaron Rodgers 3-yard run (Mason Crosby kick), Packers 17–14, Drive: 12 plays, 72 yards, 7:47.
- CHI – Robbie Gould 25-yard field goal, Tied 17–17, Drive: 7 plays, 67 yards, 2:53.
- CHI – Robbie Gould 19-yard field goal, Bears 20–17, Drive: 7 plays, 45 yards, 2:14.

Top passers

- GB – Aaron Rodgers – 34/45, 316 yards, 1 touchdown, 1 interception
- CHI – Jay Cutler – 16/27, 221 yards, 1 touchdown, 1 interception

Top rushers

- GB – John Kuhn – 6 rushes, 31 yards
- CHI – Jay Cutler – 3 rushes, 37 yards

Top receivers

- GB – Jermichael Finley – 9 receptions, 115 yards
- CHI – Johnny Knox – 4 receptions, 94 yards

Top tacklers

- GB – Tramon Williams – 7 tackles, 1 sack
- CHI – Lance Briggs, Brian Urlacher – 9 tackles

Coming off their road win over the Cowboys, the Bears went home, donned their throwback uniforms, and played a Week 3 Monday night duel with their so-called hated rival, the Green Bay Packers. Chicago would trail in the first quarter as Packers quarterback Aaron Rodgers completed a seven-yard touchdown pass to wide receiver Greg Jennings. Green Bay would add onto their lead in the second quarter with a 38-yard field goal from kicker Mason Crosby. Afterwards, the Bears answered with quarterback Jay Cutler connecting with tight end Greg Olsen on a nine-yard touchdown pass. After a scoreless third quarter, Chicago took the lead as wide receiver Devin Hester returned a punt 62 yards for a touchdown. However, the Packers struck back as Rodgers got a three-yard touchdown run. The Bears would get the last laugh as kicker Robbie Gould booted 25-yard and 19-yard field goals, the latter in the closing seconds of the game to put the Bears on top.

With the win, Chicago improved to 3–0.

=== Week 4: at New York Giants ===
Week 4: Chicago Bears at New York Giants – Game summary

Quarter	1	2	3	4	Total
Bears	0	0	0	3	3
Giants	3	0	7	7	17

at New Meadowlands Stadium, East Rutherford, New Jersey

- Date: October 3
- Game time: 8:20 p.m. EDT
- Game weather: 59°F (Scattered showers)
- Game attendance: 77,716 (94.1% full)
- Referee: Carl Cheffers
- TV announcers (NBC): Al Michaels, Cris Collinsworth, & Andrea Kremer
- Game Book Recap

Game information

First quarter

- NYG – Lawrence Tynes 22-yard field goal, Giants 3–0, Drive: 11 plays, 76 yards, 5:08.

Second quarter

- No scoring plays

Third quarter

- NYG – Ahmad Bradshaw 3-yard run (Lawrence Tynes kick), Giants 10–0, Drive: 8 plays, 90 yards, 5:18.

Fourth quarter

- CHI – Robbie Gould 40-yard field goal, Giants 10–3, Drive: 4 plays, 7 yards, 0:52.
- NYG – Brandon Jacobs 2-yard run (Lawrence Tynes kick), Giants 17–3, Drive: 2 plays, 32 yards, 0:50.

Top passers

- CHI – Jay Cutler – 8/11, 42 yards, 1 interception
- NYG – Eli Manning – 18/30, 195 yards

Top rushers

- CHI – Matt Forte – 12 rushes, 26 yards
- NYG – Ahmad Bradshaw – 23 rushes, 129 yards, 1 touchdown

Top receivers

- CHI – Greg Olsen – 5 receptions, 39 yards
- NYG – Hakeem Nicks – 8 receptions, 110 yards

Top tacklers

- CHI – Danieal Manning – 8 tackles, 3 assists
- NYG – Jonathan Goff – 5 tackles, 5 assists, 0.5 sack

Scoring summary

Quarter	Time	Drive			Team	Scoring information	Score	
Quarter	Time	Plays	Yards	TOP	Team	Scoring information	Bears	Giants
1	3:29		76	5:08	Giants	22-yard field goal by Lawrence Tynes	0	3
3	2:48		90	5:18	Giants	Ahmad Bradshaw 3-yard touchdown run, Lawrence Tynes kick good	0	10
4	10:58		7	:52	Bears	40-yard field goal by Robbie Gould	3	10
4	4:31		32	:50	Giants	Brandon Jacobs 2-yard touchdown run, Lawrence Tynes kick good	3	17
"TOP" = time of possession. For other American football terms, see Glossary of American football.							3	17

Coming off their Monday night home win over the Packers, the Bears flew to New Meadowlands Stadium for a Week 4 Sunday night duel with the New York Giants. Chicago would trail early in the first quarter as Giants kicker Lawrence Tynes got a 22-yard field goal. Both teams went scoreless in the second quarter, but pressure on Bears quarterback Jay Cutler was mounting. By the half's end, Cutler had already been sacked nine times. Cutler would leave the game early in the third quarter with a concussion and would be replaced by backup Todd Collins. The Bears' deficit increased in the third quarter as running back Ahmad Bradshaw got a three-yard touchdown run. Chicago would finally get on the board in the fourth quarter as kicker Robbie Gould got a 40-yard field goal, but New York would come right back as running back Brandon Jacobs scored on a two-yard touchdown run.

With the loss, Chicago fell to 3–1.

=== Week 5: at Carolina Panthers ===
Week 5: Chicago Bears at Carolina Panthers – Game summary

Quarter	1	2	3	4	Total
Bears	17	0	0	6	23
Panthers	3	0	3	0	6

at Bank of America Stadium, Charlotte, North Carolina

- Date: October 10
- Game time: 12:00 p.m. CDT
- Game weather: 81°F (Sunny)
- Game attendance: 73,464 (99.6% full)
- Referee: Mike Carey
- TV announcers (Fox): Sam Rosen & Tim Ryan
- Recap

Game information

First quarter

- CHI – Matt Forte 18-yard run (Robbie Gould kick), Bears 7–0, Drive: 4 plays, 38 yards, 1:45.
- CAR – John Kasay 24-yard field goal, Bears 7–3, Drive: 9 plays, 55 yards, 5:23.
- CHI – Matt Forte 68-yard run, Bears 14–3, Drive: 1 plays, 68 yards, 0:17.
- CHI – Robbie Gould 28-yard field goal, Bears 17–3, Drive: 5 plays, 17 yards, 1:43.

Second quarter

- No scoring plays

Third quarter

- CAR – John Kasay 53-yard field goal, Bears 17–6, Drive: 7 plays, 8 yards, 2:52.

Fourth quarter

- CHI – Robbie Gould 53-yard field goal, Bears 20–6, Drive: 6 plays, 15 yards, 2:27.
- CHI – Robbie Gould 43-yard field goal, Bears 23–6, Drive: 4 plays, −2 yards, 1:27.

Top passers

- CHI – Todd Collins – 6/16, 32 yards, 4 interceptions
- CAR – Jimmy Clausen – 9/22, 61 yards, 1 interception

Top rushers

- CHI – Matt Forte – 22 rushes, 166 yards, 2 touchdowns
- CAR – DeAngelo Williams – 12 rushes, 51 yards

Top receivers

- CHI – Matt Forte – 2 receptions, 22 yards
- CAR – David Gettis – 3 receptions, 32 yards

Top tacklers

- CHI – Chris Harris – 5 tackles, 2 assists
- CAR – Dan Connor – 6 tackles, 5 assists

Hoping to rebound from their loss to the Giants the Bears flew to Bank of America Stadium for a matchup against the Carolina Panthers. The Bears took the lead in the first quarter as RB Matt Forte got an 18-yard TD run. The Panthers replied with kicker John Kasay making a 24-yard field goal. The lead increased with Forte making a 68-yard TD run, followed by a 28-yard field goal from kicker Robbie Gould. In the third quarter the Panthers replied with Kasay making a 53-yard field goal, but in the fourth quarter the Bears pulled away when Gould made 53- and 43-yard field goals.

With the win, Chicago improved to 4–1.

=== Week 6: vs. Seattle Seahawks ===
Week 6: Seattle Seahawks at Chicago Bears – Game summary

Quarter	1	2	3	4	Total
Seahawks	7	7	2	7	23
Bears	7	6	0	7	20

at Soldier Field, Chicago, Illinois

- Date: October 17
- Game time: 12:00 p.m. CDT
- Game weather: 63°F (Sunny)
- Game attendance: 62,137 (101% full)
- Referee: Alberto Riveron
- TV announcers (Fox): Chris Myers, Brian Billick & Charissa Thompson
- Recap

Game information

First quarter

- CHI – Matt Forte 6-yard run (Robbie Gould kick), Bears 7–0, Drive: 4 plays, 80 yards, 2:18.
- SEA – Deon Butler 22-yard pass from Matt Hasselbeck (Olindo Mare kick), Tied 7–7, Drive: 6 plays, 80 yards, 2:39.

Second quarter

- SEA – Justin Forsett 9-yard run (Olindo Mare kick), Seahawks 14–7, Drive: 7 plays, 37 yards, 2:41.
- CHI – Robbie Gould 34-yard field goal, Seahawks 14–10, Drive: 7 plays, 65 yards, 3:00.
- CHI – Robbie Gould 24-yard field goal, Seahawks 14–13, Drive: 7 plays, 86 yards, 2:19.

Third quarter

- SEA – Jay Cutler tackled in end zone by Jordan Babineaux for a safety, Seahawks 16–13.

Fourth quarter

- SEA – Marshawn Lynch 1-yard run (Olindo Mare kick), Seahawks 23–13, Drive: 11 plays, 92 yards, 5:43.
- CHI – Devin Hester 89-yard punt return (Robbie Gould kick), Seahawks 23–20.

Top passers

- SEA – Matt Hasselbeck – 25/40, 242 yards, 1 touchdown
- CHI – Jay Cutler – 17/39, 290 yards

Top rushers

- SEA – Justin Forsett – 10 rushes, 67 yards, 1 touchdown
- CHI – Chester Taylor – 4 rushes, 31 yards

Top receivers

- SEA – Mike Williams – 10 receptions, 123 yards
- CHI – Johnny Knox – 5 receptions, 120 yards

Top tacklers

- SEA – Marcus Trufant – 4 tackles, 2 assists
- CHI – Brian Iwuh – 8 tackles, 1 assist

Hoping to increase their winning streak the Bears returned to Chicago for an NFC duel with the Seattle Seahawks. The Bears took the early lead as RB Matt Forte got a six-yard TD run. But the Seahawks answered back with QB Matt Hasselbeck getting a 22-yard TD pass to WR Deon Butler, followed in the second quarter by RB Justin Forsett getting a 9-yard TD run. Then the Bears responded with kicker Robbie Gould making a 34 and a 24-yard field goal. In the third quarter the Bears fell further behind when QB Jay Cutler was sacked in the endzone by free safety Jordan Babineaux for a safety. This was followed in the fourth quarter by RB Marshawn Lynch getting a 1-yard TD run. The Bears tried to come back into the game but only came away with a touchdown after WR Devin Hester returned a punt 89 yards to the endzone for a touchdown.

With the loss, Chicago fell to 4–2.

=== Week 7: vs. Washington Redskins ===
Week 7: Washington Redskins at Chicago Bears – Game summary

Quarter	1	2	3	4	Total
Redskins	7	3	7	0	17
Bears	7	7	0	0	14

at Soldier Field, Chicago, Illinois

- Date: October 24
- Game time: 1:00 p.m. EDT
- Game weather: 66°F (Partly Cloudy)
- Game attendance: 62,155 (101.1% full)
- Referee: Walt Anderson
- TV announcers (Fox): Thom Brennaman, Troy Aikman & Pam Oliver
- Recap

Game information

First quarter

- CHI – D.J. Moore 54-yard interception return (Robbie Gould kick), Bears 7–0.
- WAS – Santana Moss 24-yard pass from Donovan McNabb (Graham Gano kick), Tied 7–7, Drive: 9 plays, 72 yards, 4:55.

Second quarter

- WAS – Graham Gano 46-yard field goal, Redskins 10–7, Drive: 6 plays, 22 yards, 2:41.
- CHI – Johnny Knox 9-yard pass from Jay Cutler (Robbie Gould kick), Bears 14–10, Drive: 7 plays, 70 yards, 3:49.

Third quarter

- WAS – DeAngelo Hall 92-yard interception return (Robbie Gould kick), Redskins 17–14.

Fourth quarter

- No scoring plays

Top passers

- WAS – Donovan McNabb – 17/32, 200 yards, 1 touchdown, 2 interceptions
- CHI – Jay Cutler – 26/40, 281 yards, 1 touchdown, 4 interceptions

Top rushers

- WAS – Ryan Torain – 21 rushes, 125 yards
- CHI – Matt Forte – 10 rushes, 41 yards

Top receivers

- WAS – Santana Moss – 5 receptions, 63 yards, 1 touchdown
- CHI – Johnny Knox – 6 receptions, 86 yards, 1 touchdown

Top tacklers

- WAS – Rocky McIntosh – 6 tackles, 2 assists, 1.0 sack, 1 forced fumble
- CHI – Charles Tillman – 7 tackles, 1 assist, 2 forced fumbles

The Bears' seventh game was an NFC duel with the Redskins at home. In the first quarter, the Bears took a sudden lead as CB D.J. Moore returned an interception 54 yards for a touchdown. However, their defense was broken down as QB Donovan McNabb completed a 24-yard TD pass to WR Santana Moss. In the second quarter, they trailed after kicker Graham Gano nailed a 46-yard field goal. The Bears' offense broke through as QB Jay Cutler got a 9-yard TD pass to WR Johnny Knox, but was closed off in the third quarter as Cutler's pass was intercepted by DeAngelo Hall and returned 92 yards for a touchdown. Hall intercepted four passes during the game, which is an NFL record.

With the loss, Chicago fell to 4–3 heading into their bye week.

=== Week 9: at Buffalo Bills (Bills International Series) ===
Week 9: Chicago Bears at Buffalo Bills – Game summary

Quarter	1	2	3	4	Total
Bears	0	7	7	8	22
Bills	0	7	6	6	19

at Rogers Centre, Toronto, Ontario, Canada

- Date: November 7
- Game time: 1:00 p.m. EST
- Game weather: None (Dome Closed)
- Game attendance: 50,746 (94% full)
- Referee: Gene Steratore
- TV announcers (Fox): Sam Rosen & Tim Ryan
- Recap

Game information

First quarter Second quarter

- CHI – Greg Olsen 4-yard pass from Jay Cutler (Robbie Gould kick), Bears 7–0, Drive: 14 plays, 81 yards, 8:03.
- BUF – Roscoe Parrish 14-yard pass from Ryan Fitzpatrick (Rian Lindell kick), Tied 7–7, Drive: 11 plays, 68 yards, 1:32.

Third quarter

- CHI – Chester Taylor 1-yard run (Robbie Gould kick), Bears 14–7, Drive: 9 plays, 60 yards, 4:54.
- BUF – Fred Jackson 4-yard run (kick blocked), Bears 14–13, Drive: 8 plays, 80 yards, 3:19.

Fourth quarter

- BUF – Corey McIntyre 1-yard run (run failed), Bills 19–14, Drive: 8 plays, 51 yards, 4:21.
- CHI – Earl Bennett 2-yard pass from Jay Cutler (Jay Cutler – Matt Forte pass), Bears 22–19, Drive: 6 plays, 23 yards, 2:22.

Top passers

- CHI – Jay Cutler – 17/30, 188 yards, 2 touchdowns
- BUF – Ryan Fitzpatrick – 31/51, 299 yards, 1 touchdown, 2 interceptions

Top rushers

- CHI – Matt Forte – 14 rushes, 49 yards
- BUF – C. J. Spiller – 7 rushes, 20 yards

Top receivers

- CHI – Earl Bennett – 4 receptions, 52 yards, 1 touchdown
- BUF – Stevie Johnson – 11 receptions, 145 yards

Top tacklers

- CHI – Lance Briggs – 7 tackles, 1 forced fumble
- BUF – Donte Whitner – 7 tackles, 1 assist

Coming off their bye week, the Bears flew to the Rogers Centre for their Week 9 interconference duel with the winless Buffalo Bills. After a scoreless first quarter, Chicago delivered the opening strike in the second quarter as quarterback Jay Cutler found tight end Greg Olsen on a 4-yard touchdown pass. The Bills responded with quarterback Ryan Fitzpatrick completing a 14-yard touchdown pass to wide receiver Roscoe Parrish.

The Bears regained the lead in the third quarter with a 1-yard touchdown run from running back Chester Taylor. Buffalo answered with running back Fred Jackson getting a 4-yard touchdown run (with a blocked extra point). Chicago trailed in the fourth quarter as fullback Corey McIntyre got a 1-yard touchdown run, yet they came right back as Cutler found wide receiver Earl Bennett on a 2-yard touchdown pass, followed by a successful two-point conversion pass to running back Matt Forté. The Bears would eventually take the win as a Fitzpatrick throw was intercepted by cornerback Tim Jennings.

With the win, Chicago improved to 5–3.

=== Week 10: vs. Minnesota Vikings ===
Week 10: Minnesota Vikings at Chicago Bears – Game summary

Quarter	1	2	3	4	Total
Vikings	3	7	3	0	13
Bears	0	14	6	7	27

at Soldier Field, Chicago, Illinois

- Date: November 14
- Game time: 12:00 p.m. CST
- Game weather: 48°F (Cloudy, wind gusts up to 29 mph)
- Game attendance: 62,206 (101.1% full)
- Referee: Tony Corrente
- TV announcers (Fox): Kenny Albert, Daryl Johnston & Tony Siragusa
- Recap

Game information

First quarter

- MIN – Ryan Longwell 36-yard field goal, Vikings 3–0, Drive: 11 plays, 62 yards, 6:32.

Second quarter

- CHI – Greg Olsen 17-yard pass from Jay Cutler (Robbie Gould kick), Bears 7–3, Drive: 11 plays, 71 yards, 5:13.
- MIN – Percy Harvin 53-yard pass from Brett Favre (Ryan Longwell kick), Vikings 10–7, Drive: 1 plays, 53 yards, 0:09.
- CHI – Devin Hester 19-yard pass from Jay Cutler (Robbie Gould kick), Bears 14–10, Drive: 8 plays, 49 yards, 2:33.

Third quarter

- CHI – Robbie Gould 34-yard field goal, Bears 17–10, Drive: 4 plays, −6 yards, 0:59.
- MIN – Ryan Longwell 33-yard field goal, Bears 17–13, Drive: 4 plays, 42 yards, 1:05.
- CHI – Robbie Gould 37-yard field goal, Bears 20–13, Drive: 7 plays, 14 yards, 2:48.

Fourth quarter

- CHI – Kellen Davis 19-yard pass from Jay Cutler (Robbie Gould kick), Bears 27–13, Drive: 8 plays, 55 yards, 4:31.

Top passers

- MIN – Brett Favre – 18/31, 170 yards, 1 touchdown, 3 interceptions
- CHI – Jay Cutler – 22/35, 237 yards, 3 touchdowns, 2 interceptions

Top rushers

- MIN – Adrian Peterson – 17 rushes, 51 yards
- CHI – Matt Forte – 21 rushes, 69 yards

Top receivers

- MIN – Percy Harvin – 4 receptions, 64 yards, 1 touchdown
- CHI – Johnny Knox – 5 receptions, 90 yards

Top tacklers

- MIN – E.J. Henderson – 9 tackles, 1 assist
- CHI – Brian Urlacher – 7 tackles

Coming off their win over the Bills the Bears played on home ground for an NFC North rivalry match against the Vikings. In the first quarter the Bears trailed early after kicker Ryan Longwell hit a 36-yard field goal. They took the lead in the second quarter when QB Jay Cutler threw a 17-yard TD pass to TE Greg Olsen. They fell behind after QB Brett Favre completed a 53-yard TD pass to WR Percy Harvin. They got the lead back when Cutler got a 19-yard TD pass to WR Devin Hester. The Bears extended their lead in the third quarter after kicker Robbie Gould nailed a 34-yard field goal. The Vikings replied with Longwell making a 33-yard field goal, but the Bears continued to score with Gould hitting a 37-yard field goal, and in the 4th quarter with Cutler making a 19-yard TD pass to TE Kellen Davis.

With the win, the Bears improved to 6–3.

=== Week 11: at Miami Dolphins ===
Week 11: Chicago Bears at Miami Dolphins – Game summary

Quarter	1	2	3	4	Total
Bears	3	3	10	0	16
Dolphins	0	0	0	0	0

at Sun Life Stadium, Miami Gardens, Florida

- Date: November 18
- Game time: 8:20 p.m. EST
- Game weather: 75°F (Clear)
- Game attendance: 68,752 (91.4% full)
- Referee: Bill Leavy
- TV announcers (NFLN): Bob Papa, Matt Millen & Joe Theismann
- Recap

Game information

First quarter

- CHI – Robbie Gould 47-yard field goal, Bears 3–0, Drive: 8 plays, 32 yards, 4:27

Second quarter

- CHI – Robbie Gould 24-yard field goal, Bears 6–0, Drive: 13 plays, 40 yards, 6:50

Third quarter

- CHI – Robbie Gould 50-yard field goal, Bears 9–0, Drive: 7 plays, 38 yards, 3:13
- CHI – Matt Forte 2-yard run, Bears 16–0, Drive: 13 plays, 60 yards, 7:26

Fourth quarter

Top passers

- CHI – Jay Cutler – 16/25, 156 yards, 1 interception
- MIA – Tyler Thigpen – 17/29, 187 yards, 1 interception

Top rushers

- CHI – Matt Forte – 25 rushes, 97 yards, 1 touchdown
- MIA – Tyler Thigpen – 6 rushes, 27 yards

Top receivers

- CHI – Johnny Knox – 5 receptions, 55 yards
- MIA – Brian Hartline – 5 receptions, 70 yards

Top tacklers

- CHI – Lance Briggs – 7 tackles
- MIA – Karlos Dansby – 10 tackles, 1 sack

Coming off their home win over the Vikings, the Bears flew to Sun Life Stadium for a Week 11 interconference duel with the Miami Dolphins on Thursday night. Chicago delivered the game's opening strike in the first quarter with a 46-yard field goal from kicker Robbie Gould. The Bears added onto their lead in the second quarter with Gould's 24-yard field goal.

Chicago went back to work in the third quarter as Gould booted a 50-yard field goal, followed by a 2-yard touchdown run from running back Matt Forté. As they had done all game, the Bears defense continued to stifle any offensive production by the Dolphins, thus completing the shutout, the first shutout recorded by the Bears since 2006. As of 2025, this remains the final shutout by the team.

With the win, not only did the Bears improve to 7–3, but they also won their 700th game in franchise history (the first NFL team to do so).

Ironically, 25 years prior, the Bears lost to the Dolphins, with the score of the 2010 matchup being the record the 1985 team was vying for had they been able to defeat the Dolphins.

=== Week 12: vs. Philadelphia Eagles ===
Week 12: Philadelphia Eagles at Chicago Bears – Game summary

Quarter	1	2	3	4	Total
Eagles	3	10	0	13	26
Bears	14	7	10	0	31

at Soldier Field, Chicago, Illinois

- Date: November 28
- Game time: 4:15 p.m. EST
- Game weather: 39 °F (4 °C), (Partly Cloudy)
- Game attendance: 62,147 (101.1% full)
- Referee: Scott Green
- TV announcers (Fox): Kenny Albert, Daryl Johnston & Tony Siragusa
- Recap

Game information

First quarter

- PHI – David Akers 45-yard field goal, Eagles 3–0, Drive: 6 plays, 23 yards, 2:24.
- CHI – Earl Bennett 10-yard pass from Jay Cutler (Robbie Gould kick), Bears 7–3, Drive: 4 plays, 79 yards, 1:55.
- CHI – Johnny Knox 20-yard pass from Jay Cutler (Robbie Gould kick), Bears 14–3, Drive: 4 plays, 59 yards, 2:13.

Second quarter

- PHI – Jeremy Maclin 8-yard pass from Michael Vick (David Akers kick), Bears 14–10, Drive: 10 plays, 65 yards, 4:07.
- PHI – David Akers 36-yard field goal, Bears 14–13, Drive: 8 plays, 41 yards, 3:25.
- CHI – Earl Bennett 6-yard pass from Jay Cutler (Robbie Gould kick), Bears 21–13, Drive: 6 plays, 63 yards, 1:12.

Third quarter

- CHI – Greg Olsen 9-yard pass from Jay Cutler (Robbie Gould kick), Bears 28–13, Drive: 3 plays, 54 yards, 1:31.
- CHI – Robbie Gould 23-yard field goal, Bears 31–13, Drive: 17 plays, 83 yards, 10:05.

Fourth quarter

- PHI – David Akers 22-yard field goal, Bears 31–16, Drive: 11 plays, 65 yards, 4:35.
- PHI – David Akers 36-yard field goal, Bears 31–19, Drive: 8 plays, 58 yards, 3:32.
- PHI – Brent Celek 30-yard pass from Michael Vick (David Akers kick), Bears 31–26, Drive: 9 plays, 86 yards, 2:30.

Top passers

- PHI – Michael Vick – 29/44, 333 yards, 2 touchdowns, 1 interception
- CHI – Jay Cutler – 14/21, 247 yards, 4 touchdowns

Top rushers

- PHI – LeSean McCoy – 10 rushes, 53 yards
- CHI – Matt Forte – 14 rushes, 117 yards

Top receivers

- PHI – Jason Avant – 8 receptions, 83 yards
- CHI – Devin Hester – 3 receptions, 86 yards

Top tacklers

- PHI – Stewart Bradley, Ernie Sims – 5 tackles
- CHI – Brian Urlacher – 9 tackles, 1 assist

Coming off their win over the Dolphins, the Bears played on home ground for an NFC duel with the Eagles. The Bears trailed early with kicker David Akers nailing a 45-yard field goal. They took the lead after QB Jay Cutler completed a 10 and a 20-yard TD pass to wide receivers Earl Bennett and Johnny Knox respectively. The lead was narrowed with QB Michael Vick getting an 8-yard TD pass to WR Jeremy Maclin, followed by Akers hitting a 36-yard field goal. The Bears increased their lead as Cutler got a 6 and a 9-yard TD pass to Bennett and Greg Olsen. This was followed by kicker Robbie Gould making a 23-yard field goal. The Eagles tried to narrow the lead as Akers got a 22 and a 36-yard field goal, followed by Vick throwing a 30-yard TD pass to TE Brent Celek, but they failed to recover the onside kick which could have given them one last shot to win.

With the win, Chicago improved to 8–3.

=== Week 13: at Detroit Lions ===
Week 13: Chicago Bears at Detroit Lions – Game summary

Quarter	1	2	3	4	Total
Bears	7	7	3	7	24
Lions	7	10	3	0	20

at Ford Field, Detroit, Michigan

- Date: December 5
- Game time: 12:00 p.m. CST
- Game weather: None (dome stadium)
- Game attendance: 58,119 (90.1% full)
- Referee: Ed Hochuli
- TV announcers (Fox): Sam Rosen, Tim Ryan & Jennifer Hammond
- Recap

Game information

First quarter

- DET – Drew Stanton 3-yard run (Dave Rayner kick), Lions 7–0, Drive: 7 plays, 38 yards, 2:25.
- CHI – Chester Taylor 1-yard run (Robbie Gould kick), Tied 7–7, Drive: 13 plays, 76 yards, 6:33.

Second quarter

- DET – Dave Rayner 50-yard field goal, Lions 10–7, Drive: 10 plays, 39 yards, 5:32.
- CHI – Matt Forte 14-yard run (Robbie Gould kick), Bears 14–10, Drive: 8 plays, 83 yards, 4:51.
- DET – Calvin Johnson 46-yard pass from Drew Stanton (Dave Rayner kick), Lions 17–14, Drive: 2 plays, 91 yards, 0:19.

Third quarter

- DET – Dave Rayner 25-yard field goal, Lions 20–14, Drive: 4 plays, 2 yards, 1:32.
- CHI – Robbie Gould 54-yard field goal, Lions 20–17, Drive: 4 plays, −5 yards, 2:49.

Fourth quarter

- CHI – Brandon Manumaleuna 7-yard pass from Jay Cutler (Robbie Gould kick), Bears 24–20, Drive: 6 plays, 60 yards, 3:16.

Top passers

- CHI – Jay Cutler – 21/26, 234 yards, 1 touchdown
- DET – Drew Stanton – 16/24, 178 yards, 1 touchdown

Top rushers

- CHI – Matt Forte – 13 rushes, 64 yards, 1 touchdown
- DET – Jahvid Best – 9 rushes, 65 yards

Top receivers

- CHI – Earl Bennett – 7 receptions, 104 yards
- DET – Calvin Johnson – 3 receptions, 66 yards, 1 touchdown

Top tacklers

- CHI – Brian Urlacher – 10 tackles, 7 assists, 1 forced fumble
- DET – Louis Delmas – 5 tackles, 3 assists

The Bears' twelfth game was an NFC North rivalry match against the Lions at Ford Field. In the first quarter the Bears trailed early as QB Drew Stanton scrambled 3 yards to the endzone for a touchdown. They replied with RB Chester Taylor getting a 1-yard TD run. The tie did not last long as kicker Dave Rayner hit a 50-yard field goal. They took the lead with RB Matt Forte getting a 14-yard TD run. They fell behind again after Stanton completed a 46-yard TD pass to WR Calvin Johnson, followed by Rayner nailing a 25-yard field goal. The Bears responded to take the win with kicker Robbie Gould making a 54-yard field goal, followed by QB Jay Cutler making a 7-yard TD pass to TE Brandon Manumaleuna.

With the win, Chicago improved to 9–3.

=== Week 14: vs. New England Patriots ===
Week 14: New England Patriots at Chicago Bears – Game summary

Quarter	1	2	3	4	Total
Patriots	7	26	3	0	36
Bears	0	0	7	0	7

at Soldier Field, Chicago, Illinois

- Date: December 12
- Game time: 3:15 p.m. CST
- Game weather: 24 °F (Snow, windy with gusts to 53 m.p.h., temps falling to low 20s)
- Game attendance: 62,347 (101.4% full)
- Referee: Mike Carey
- TV announcers (CBS): Jim Nantz & Phil Simms
- Recap

Game information

First quarter

- NE – Rob Gronkowski 7-yard pass from Tom Brady (Shayne Graham kick), Patriots 7–0, Drive: 12 plays, 85 yards, 5:16.

Second quarter

- NE – Danny Woodhead 3-yard run (Shayne Graham kick), Patriots 14–0, Drive: 11 plays, 87 yards, 4:44.
- NE – Gary Guyton 35-yard fumble return (Shayne Graham kick), Patriots 21–0.
- NE – Shayne Graham 30-yard field goal, Patriots 24–0, Drive: 7 plays, 18 yards, 3:33.
- NE – Shayne Graham 25-yard field goal, Patriots 27–0, Drive: 4 plays, 2 yards, 1:01.
- NE – Deion Branch 59-yard pass from Tom Brady (kick failed, wr), Patriots 33–0, Drive: 5 plays, 80 yards, 1:38.

Third quarter

- NE – Shayne Graham 29-yard field goal, Patriots 36–0, Drive: 7 plays, 52 yards, 2:55.
- CHI – Chester Taylor 1-yard run (Robbie Gould kick), Patriots 36–7, Drive: 6 plays, 35 yards, 2:13.

Fourth quarter

Top passers

- NE – Tom Brady – 27/40, 369 yards, 2 touchdowns
- CHI – Jay Cutler – 12/26, 152 yards, 2 interceptions

Top rushers

- NE – BenJarvus Green-Ellis – 21 rushes, 87 yards
- CHI – Matt Forte – 9 rushes, 25 yards

Top receivers

- NE – Deion Branch – 8 receptions, 151 yards, 1 touchdown
- CHI – Earl Bennett – 3 receptions, 53 yards

Top tacklers

- NE – Pat Chung – 4 tackles, 2 assists
- CHI – Brian Urlacher – 9 tackles, 2 assists, 1.0 sack

Hoping to make it 6-straight the Bears played an interconference duel with the Patriots at home. The Bears trailed early as the Patriots commanded the first half with QB Tom Brady throwing a 7-yard TD pass to TE Rob Gronkowski, followed by RB Danny Woodhead getting a 3-yard TD run, then with ILB Gary Guyton recovering a fumble 35 yards for a touchdown. This was followed by kicker Shayne Graham getting a 30 and a 25-yard field goal, and then by Brady completing a 59-yard TD pass to WR Deion Branch. The Bears fell further behind with Graham getting a 29-yard field goal. The Bears tried to come back, but only came away with a 1-yard TD run by Chester Taylor, with the fourth quarter controlled by the defense, giving them a loss.

With the loss, Chicago fell to 9–4.

=== Week 15: at Minnesota Vikings ===
Week 15: Chicago Bears at Minnesota Vikings – Game summary

Quarter	1	2	3	4	Total
Bears	10	7	20	3	40
Vikings	7	0	7	0	14

at TCF Bank Stadium, Minneapolis, Minnesota (moved from Mall of America Field due to the collapse of the Metrodome roof)

- Date: December 20
- Game time: 7:30 p.m. CST
- Game weather: 23°F (Snow)
- Game attendance: 40,504 (79.9% full)
- Referee: Carl Cheffers
- TV announcers (ESPN): Mike Tirico, Ron Jaworski, Jon Gruden, Michele Tafoya & Suzy Kolber
- Game Book, Recap

Game information

First quarter

- MIN – Percy Harvin 23-yard pass from Brett Favre (Ryan Longwell kick), Vikings 7–0, Drive: 6 plays, 60 yards, 3:38.
- CHI – Robbie Gould 29-yard field goal, Vikings 7–3, Drive: 4 plays, 3 yards, 1:25.
- CHI – Johnny Knox 67-yard pass from Jay Cutler (Robbie Gould kick), Bears 10–7, Drive: 1 plays, 47 yards, 0:55.

Second quarter

- CHI – Devin Hester 15-yard pass from Jay Cutler (Robbie Gould kick), Bears 17–7, Drive: 8 plays, 70 yards, 4:17.

Third quarter

- CHI – Robbie Gould 23-yard field goal, Bears 20–7, Drive: 4 plays, 1 yards, 0:54.
- CHI – Devin Hester 64-yard punt return (Robbie Gould kick), Bears 27–7.
- MIN – Joe Webb 13-yard run (Ryan Longwell kick), Bears 27–14, Drive: 4 plays, 68 yards, 2:19.
- CHI – Rashied Davis 9-yard pass from Jay Cutler (Robbie Gould kick), Bears 34–13, Drive: 7 plays, 53 yards, 4:31.
- CHI – Robbie Gould 34-yard field goal, Bears 37–14, Drive: 7 plays, 29 yards, 3:39.

Fourth quarter

- CHI – Robbie Gould 20-yard field goal, Bears 40–14, Drive: 7 plays, 30 yards, 3:26.

Top passers

- CHI – Jay Cutler – 14/24, 194 yards, 3 touchdowns, 1 interception
- MIN – Joe Webb – 15/26, 129 yards, 2 interceptions

Top rushers

- CHI – Matt Forte – 17 rushes, 92 yards
- MIN – Toby Gerhart – 16 rushes, 77 yards

Top receivers

- CHI – Johnny Knox – 2 receptions, 78 yards, 1 touchdown
- MIN – Percy Harvin – 5 receptions, 72 yards, 1 touchdown

Top tacklers

- CHI – Brian Urlacher – 7 tackles, 1 assist
- MIN – Husain Abdullah – 6 tackles, 1 assist

With the Monday night game having been moved to the University of Minnesota's TCF Bank Stadium due to the snow-induced collapse of the Metrodome roof, Chicago looked to rebound from the previous week's rout in the first outdoor NFL game held in Minnesota in over two decades. Quarterback Brett Favre made a surprise start for the Vikings after having been ruled out earlier in the week due to injury.

Minnesota started strong with an impressive opening drive that culminated in a touchdown pass from Favre to Percy Harvin, but the Bears soon took control in all three phases as the Vikings would be outscored 40–7 over the rest of the game. Jay Cutler connected with Johnny Knox, Devin Hester, and Rashied Davis for three touchdown passes, and Robbie Gould was 4-for-4 on field goal attempts. Chicago wide receiver/kick returner Devin Hester ran his way into the record books in the third quarter, scoring a touchdown on a punt return off the foot of the Vikings' Chris Kluwe and becoming the all-time NFL leader in combined punt and kick returns for touchdowns. Minnesota quarterback Joe Webb (who entered the game in the second quarter after Favre was injured while being sacked by Bears rookie Corey Wootton) scrambled for a touchdown in the third quarter.

With the win, Chicago improved to 10–4 and clinched the NFC North division title.

=== Week 16: vs. New York Jets ===
Week 16: New York Jets at Chicago Bears – Game summary

Quarter	1	2	3	4	Total
Jets	0	24	7	3	34
Bears	10	7	21	0	38

at Soldier Field, Chicago, Illinois

- Date: December 26
- Game time: 12:00 p.m. CST
- Game weather: 32°F (Light Snow)
- Game attendance: 62,310 (101.3% full)
- Referee: Walt Coleman
- TV announcers (CBS): Jim Nantz & Phil Simms
- Box Score Recap

Game information

First quarter

- CHI – Robbie Gould 37-yard field goal, Bears 3–0, Drive: 9 plays, 47 yards, 5:20.
- CHI – Matt Forte 22-yard run (Robbie Gould kick), Bears 10–0, Drive: 4 plays, 45 yards, 1:53.

Second quarter

- NYJ – Shonn Greene 3-yard run (Nick Folk kick), Bears 10–7, Drive: 8 plays, 80 yards, 4:58.
- NYJ – Dwight Lowery 20-yard interception return (Nick Folk kick), Jets 14–10.
- NYJ – LaDainian Tomlinson 3-yard run (Nick Folk kick), Jets 21–10, Drive: 6 plays, 36 yards, 2:39.
- CHI – Jay Cutler 2-yard run (Robbie Gould kick), Jets 21–17, Drive: 7 plays, 64 yards, 3:00.
- NYJ – Nick Folk 26-yard field goal, Jets 24–17, Drive: 9 plays, 59 yards, 2:32.

Third quarter

- CHI – Johnny Knox 40-yard pass from Jay Cutler (Robbie Gould kick), Tied 24–24, Drive: 1 plays, 40 yards, 0:08.
- CHI – Devin Hester 25-yard pass from Jay Cutler (Robbie Gould kick), Bears 31–24, Drive: 3 plays, 32 yards, 1:37.
- NYJ – Santonio Holmes 23-yard pass from Mark Sanchez (Nick Folk kick), Tied 31–31, Drive: 4 plays, 66 yards, 1:53.
- CHI – Johnny Knox 26-yard pass from Jay Cutler (Robbie Gould kick), Bears 38–31, Drive: 5 plays, 49 yards, 2:30.

Fourth quarter

- NYJ – Nick Folk 34-yard field goal, Bears 38–34, Drive: 12 plays, 51 yards, 6:14.

Top passers

- NYJ – Mark Sanchez – 24/37, 269 yards, 1 touchdown, 1 interception
- CHI – Jay Cutler – 13/25, 215 yards, 3 touchdowns, 1 interception

Top rushers

- NYJ – Shonn Greene – 12 rushes, 70 yards, 1 touchdown
- CHI – Matt Forté – 19 rushes, 113 yards, 1 touchdown

Top receivers

- NYJ – Dustin Keller – 7 receptions, 79 yards
- CHI – Johnny Knox – 4 receptions, 92 yards, 2 touchdowns

Top tacklers

- NYJ – David Harris, Calvin Pace, Darrelle Revis – 4 tackles
- CHI – Chris Harris – 10 tackles, 1 assist, 1 interception

Coming off their win over the Vikings the Bears played on home ground for an interconference duel with the Jets. In the first quarter the Bears took the lead as kicker Robbie Gould got a 37-yard field goal, followed by Matt Forte getting a 22-yard TD run. They trailed with RB Shonn Greene getting a 3-yard TD run, followed by CB Dwight Lowery returning an interception 20 yards for a touchdown, followed by RB LaDainian Tomlinson getting a 3-yard TD run letting the Jets lead 21–10. The Bears tried to cut the lead as QB Jay Cutler scrambled 2 yards for a touchdown, but the lead was soon extended as kicker Nick Folk made a 26-yard field goal. They got the lead back with Cutler completing a 40 and a 25-yard TD pass to wide receivers Devin Hester and Johnny Knox respectively, but soon the game was tied with QB Mark Sanchez throwing a 23-yard TD pass to WR Santonio Holmes. The Bears escaped the tie with Cutler finding Knox again on a 26-yard TD pass. After a 34-yard field goal from Folk, and the Bears punting, the Jets attempted to score with less than a minute left in the game, but a Chris Harris interception would seal the game for the Bears.

With the win, Chicago improved to 11–4, and clinched a first-round bye when the Eagles lost to the Vikings.

=== Week 17: at Green Bay Packers ===
Week 17: Chicago Bears at Green Bay Packers – Game summary

Quarter	1	2	3	4	Total
Bears	0	3	0	0	3
Packers	0	0	3	7	10

at Lambeau Field, Green Bay, Wisconsin

- Date: January 2
- Game time: 3:15 p.m. CST
- Game attendance: 70,833 (96.9% full)
- Referee: Alberto Riveron
- TV announcers (Fox): Joe Buck, Troy Aikman, & Pam Oliver
- Recap

Game information

First quarter Second quarter Third quarter Fourth quarter

Top passers

- CHI –
- GB –

Top rushers

- CHI –
- GB –

Top receivers

- CHI –
- GB –

Top tacklers

- CHI –
- GB –

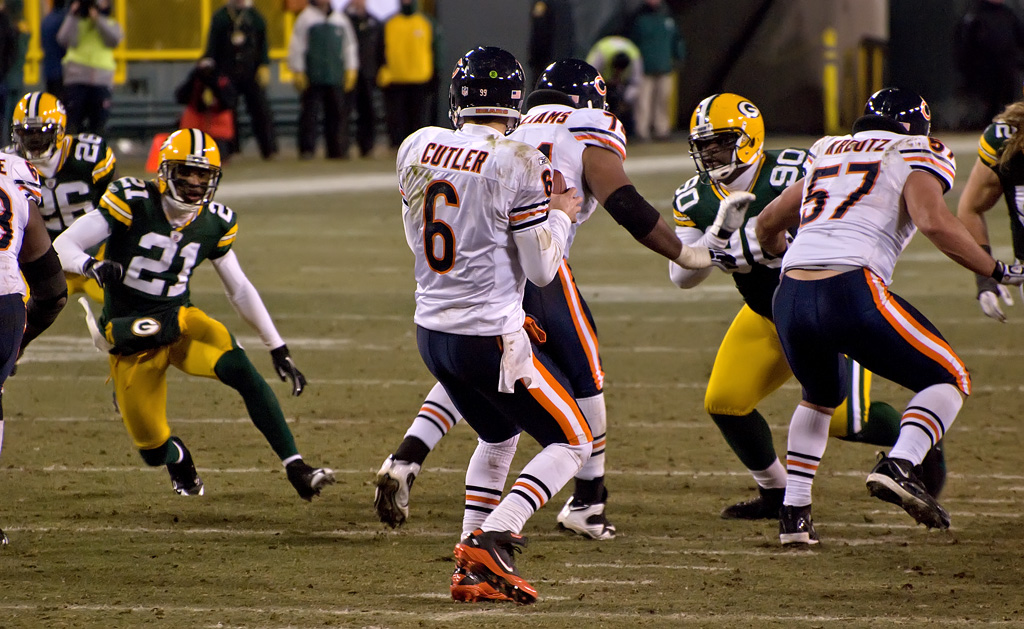
Jay Cutler passes against the Packers

The Bears' final game was an NFC North rivalry rematch against the Packers. While the Bears scored first with kicker Robbie Gould nailing a 30-yard field goal, the Packers tied the game with kicker Mason Crosby hitting a 23-yard field goal, and then eventually found the winning score with QB Aaron Rodgers throwing a 1-yard TD pass to TE Donald Lee.

With the loss, the Bears finished with an 11–5 regular season record.

== Postseason schedule ==
Week	Date	Kickoff (CST)	Opponent (seed)	Final Score	Team record	Game site	TV	NFL.com recap
Wild Card	First-round bye							
Divisional	January 16	12:00 p.m.	Seattle Seahawks (4)	**W** 35–24	12–5	Soldier Field	Fox	Recap
NFC Championship	January 23	2:00 p.m.	**Green Bay Packers** (6)	**L** 14–21	12–6	Soldier Field	Fox	Recap
NOTES: All times are Central. Division opponents are in **bold** text. COLOR KEY: # Games played with white uniforms. # Games played with color uniforms.

== Postseason results ==
=== Divisional round vs. Seattle Seahawks ===
Divisional round: Seattle Seahawks at Chicago Bears – Game summary

Quarter	1	2	3	4	Total
Seahawks	0	0	3	21	**24**
**Bears**	14	7	7	7	**35**

at Soldier Field, Chicago, Illinois

- Date: January 16, 2011
- Game time: 12:00 p.m. CST
- Game weather: 24°F (Cloudy, occasional flurries)
- Game attendance: 62,265 (101.2% full)
- Referee: Alberto Riveron
- TV announcers (FOX): Kenny Albert, Daryl Johnston, & Tony Siragusa
- Reference, Gamebook

Game information

**First quarter**

- CHI – Greg Olsen 58-yard pass from Jay Cutler (Robbie Gould kick), Bears 7–0, **Drive: 3 plays, 66 yards, 1:17.**
- CHI – Chester Taylor 1-yard run (Robbie Gould kick), Bears 14–0, **Drive: 8 plays, 50 yards, 4:05.**

**Second quarter**

- CHI – Jay Cutler 6-yard run (Robbie Gould kick), Bears 21–0, **Drive: 9 plays, 63 yards, 4:11.**

**Third quarter**

- CHI – Jay Cutler 9-yard run (Robbie Gould kick), Bears 28–0, **Drive: 14 plays, 70 yards, 7:59.**
- SEA – Olindo Mare 30-yard field goal, Bears 28–3, **Drive: 7 plays, 18 yards, 2:20.**

**Fourth quarter**

- SEA – Mike Williams 2-yard pass from Matt Hasselbeck (Olindo Mare kick), Bears 28–10, **Drive: 9 plays, 33 yards, 2:01.**
- CHI – Kellen Davis 39-yard pass from Jay Cutler (Robbie Gould kick), Bears 35–10, **Drive: 3 plays, 48 yards, 1:37.**
- SEA – Mike Williams 3-yard pass from Matt Hasselbeck (Olindo Mare kick), Bears 35–17, **Drive: 7 plays, 74 yards, 2:24.**

**Top passers** **Top passers**

- SEA – Matt Hasselbeck – 26/46, 274 yards, 3 touchdowns
- CHI – Jay Cutler – 15/27, 274 yards, 2 touchdowns

**Top rushers**

- SEA – Golden Tate – 1 rushes, 13 yards
- CHI – Matt Forté – 25 rushes, 80 yards

**Top receivers**

- SEA – Brandon Stokley – 8 rec, 85 yards, 1 touchdown
- CHI – Greg Olsen – 3 rec, 113 yards, 1 touchdown

**Top tacklers**

- SEA – David Hawthorne – 8 tackles, 1 assist
- CHI – Brian Urlacher – 7 tackles

Entering the postseason as the NFC's #2 seed, the Bears began their playoff run at home against the #4 Seattle Seahawks, hoping to avenge their Week 6 loss. Chicago delivered the game early strike in the first quarter as quarterback Jay Cutler found tight end Greg Olsen on a 58-yard touchdown pass, followed by a 1-yard touchdown run from running back Chester Taylor. The Bears added onto their lead in the second quarter with a 6-yard touchdown run from Cutler.

Chicago continued their dominating day in the third quarter with a 9-yard touchdown run from Cutler. Seattle would finally get on the board as kicker Olindo Mare got a 30-yard field goal. The Seahawks tried to rally as quarterback Matt Hasselbeck completed a 38-yard touchdown pass to wide receiver Mike Williams, yet the Bears pulled away with Cutler hooking up with tight end Kellen Davis on a 39-yard touchdown pass. Seattle closed out the game with Hasselbeck completing a 3-yard touchdown pass to Williams, followed by a 9-yard touchdown pass to wide receiver Brandon Stokley.

With the win, Chicago improved their overall record to 12–5.

=== NFC Championship vs. Green Bay Packers ===
NFC Championship: Green Bay Packers at Chicago Bears – Game summary

Quarter	1	2	3	4	Total
**Packers**	7	7	0	7	**21**
Bears	0	0	0	14	**14**

at Soldier Field, Chicago, Illinois

- Date: January 23, 2011
- Game time: 2:00 p.m. CST
- Game weather: 20°F (Partly Cloudy)
- Game attendance: 62,377 (101.4% full)
- Referee: Terry McAulay
- TV announcers (FOX): Joe Buck, Troy Aikman, Pam Oliver, & Chris Myers
- Recap, Gamebook

Game information

**First quarter**

- GB – Aaron Rodgers 1-yard run (Mason Crosby kick), Packers 7–0, **Drive: 7 plays, 84 yards, 4:10.**

**Second quarter**

- GB – James Starks 4-yard run (Mason Crosby kick), Packers 14–0, **Drive: 5 plays, 44 yards, 2:53.**

**Third quarter**

- No scoring plays

**Fourth quarter**

- CHI – Chester Taylor 1-yard run (Robbie Gould kick), Packers 14–7, **Drive: 8 plays, 67 yards, 3:55.**
- GB – B.J. Raji 18-yard interception return (Mason Crosby kick), Packers 21–7
- CHI – Earl Bennett 35-yard pass from Caleb Hanie (Robbie Gould kick), Packers 21–14, **Drive: 4 plays, 60 yards, 1:21.**

**Top passers** **Top passers**

- GB – Aaron Rodgers – 17/30, 244 yards, 2 interceptions
- CHI – Caleb Hanie – 13/20, 153 yards, 1 touchdown, 2 interceptions

**Top rushers**

- GB – James Starks – 22 rushes, 74 yards, 1 touchdown
- CHI – Matt Forté – 17 rushes, 70 yards

**Top receivers**

- GB – Greg Jennings – 8 rec, 130 yards
- CHI – Matt Forté – 10 rec, 90 yards

**Top tacklers**

- GB – Desmond Bishop – 7 tackles, 1 assist
- CHI – Brian Urlacher – 9 tackles, 1 assist, 1 sack, 1 interception

Coming off their win over the Seahawks, the Bears stayed at home for the NFC Championship Game against their historic rival, the #6 Green Bay Packers (who were coming off their victory over the top-seeded Atlanta Falcons), in Round 3 of their 2010 series. This would be the second playoff meeting between the two teams, the first since defeating Green Bay 33–14 in 1941.

Chicago trailed early in the first quarter as Packers quarterback Aaron Rodgers got a 1-yard touchdown run. Green Bay added onto their lead in the second quarter as running back James Starks got a 4-yard touchdown run. Bears center Olin Kreutz had a Lisfranc injury on the first play of the second half, but he played through the entire second half, even though he couldn't block anyone, because no one else on the active roster could effectively play center. Starting Bears quarterback Jay Cutler left the game early in the third quarter with a knee injury. After a scoreless third quarter, Chicago finally got on the board in the fourth quarter with a 1-yard touchdown run from running back Chester Taylor. However, the Packers came right back with nose tackle B. J. Raji returning an interception 18 yards for a touchdown. The Bears tried to rally with quarterback Caleb Hanie finding wide receiver Earl Bennett on a 35-yard touchdown pass, but Green Bay's Sam Shields intercepted a pass with 37 seconds left in the game.

With the loss, Chicago's season came to an end with an overall record of 12–6. This marked their last playoff appearance until 2018. In addition, this was their last playoff game against the Packers until 2025. This remains the Bears only playoff loss to the Packers.
