= NFLPA Game =

NFLPA Game may refer to:

- NFLPA Collegiate Bowl, a bowl game owned and operated by the National Football League Players Association (NFLPA)
- Texas vs The Nation, a bowl game formerly sponsored by the NFLPA
