= Eagle Stadium =

High school football stadium

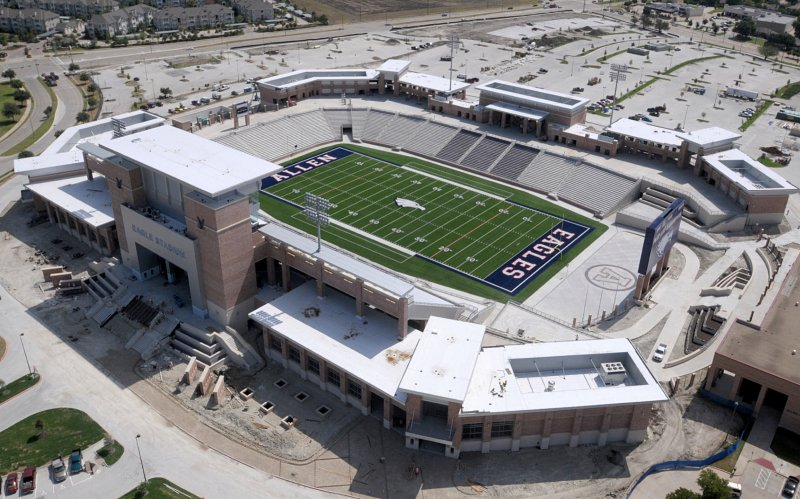
- Interactive map of Eagle Stadium
- Location: 155 Rivercrest Boulevard; Allen, Texas 75002
- Coordinates: 33°6′51″N 96°39′32″W
- Owner: Allen Independent School District
- Operator: Allen Independent School District
- Capacity: 18,000
- Surface: Matrix artificial turf
- Scoreboard: Daktronics scoreboard 75' × 45' with 38' × 23' HD screen
- Record attendance: 21,766 (2012 vs. Southlake Carroll)
- Acreage: 72

Construction
- Groundbreaking: 2010
- Opened: August 31, 2012
- Cost: US$60 million
- Architect: PBK Architects

Tenant
- Allen High School (UIL) 2012–present

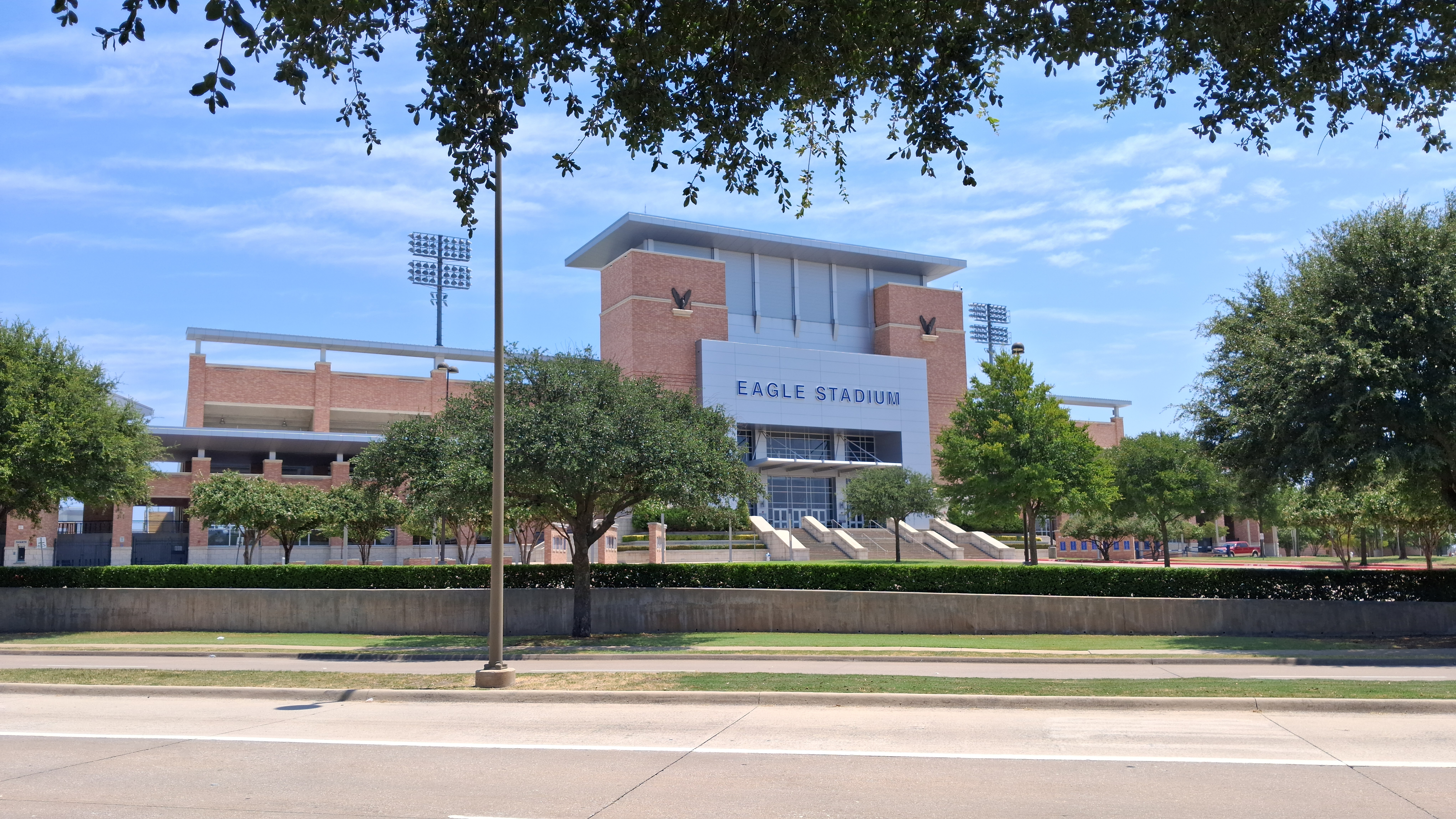
Entrance

Eagle Stadium is a football stadium in Allen, Texas. It is owned and operated by the Allen Independent School District and is home of the Allen High School Eagles.

== History ==
The stadium opened on August 31, 2012, with a non-district matchup between Allen and Southlake Carroll, who at the time was the defending 5A state champion and the No. 1 ranked team in the state. In an upset, Allen prevailed, 24–0, en route to its own state title later that year. The Eagles have enjoyed remarkable success since opening the stadium winning 54 consecutive games in the stadium from 2012–2021. Atascocita became the first team to beat the Eagles at the venue on September 3, 2021. Allen has won four state championships (2012, 2013, 2014, and 2017) since Eagle Stadium opened, and five overall (2008).

Eagle Stadium is notable (and controversial) for its size (it has a capacity of 18,000 spectators, the fifth largest high school stadium in Texas, and the largest which serves as home field for only one high school) and its cost of completion (just under US$60 million). The 18,000 seats include 9,000 home-side seats (including 1,000 reserved for the Allen Escadrille), 4,000 end-zone seats for students and general admission (located in the north end zone), and 5,000 visitor-side seats.

Beneath the grandstand, there are spaces for a wrestling room, golf simulator practice area, and a weight room.

The final Texas vs The Nation college football all-star bowl game was held at Eagle Stadium in February, 2013.

The field at the stadium is named Steve Williams Field at Eagle Stadium after former athletic director, Steve Williams. Williams retired at the end of the 2020–2021 school year, after 46 years with the Allen ISD, 21 of those years as the district's athletic director. His career achievements at Allen resulted in his induction into the Texas High School Athletic Director Association’s 2020 Hall of Honor.

=== Cracking and temporary closure ===
On February 27, 2014, the stadium was closed due to cracking in concrete making it unsafe to use. All scheduled events were canceled until further notice. Lawyers for the school district wrote a letter to the design and construction companies for the stadium, citing "construction failures" that exacerbated an "already deficient design." Repairs costing more than $10 million were made at the expense of the builder and architect, and the stadium was officially reopened on June 5, 2015, for graduation. The 2014 varsity football season played every game on the road, going undefeated and winning their third consecutive title earning the nickname "Road Warriors" by the local media.
