= Allen Eagles football =

High school football team

Allen Eagles Football
- First season: 1936
- Athletic director: Kim Garner
- Head coach: Lee Wiginton; 2022 season, 29–10–0 (.744)
- Location: Allen, Texas
- Stadium: Eagle Stadium (capacity: 18,000)
- Field: Steve Williams Field
- Conference: UIL
- Division: 6A I
- Colors: Navy, White, and Red
- All-time record: 641–257–14 (.711)

National championships
- Claimed: 2012, 2013, 2014
- Mascot: American Bald Eagle
- Marching band: Allen Escadrille
- Dance Team: Allen Tallenettes
- Website: Allen Football

The Allen Eagles Football team represents Allen High School in Texas high school football at the 6A Division 1 level in the Texas University Interscholastic League. Thirteen players from Allen have made their way to play professionally in the NFL. The Eagles play their home games at Eagle Stadium in Allen, Texas. Lee Wiginton is the head coach and has served since 2022.

== History ==
The program began in 1936, and over the past 25 years has been one of the top high school football programs in Texas, with five state championships since 2008, ten final fours since 2003, 26 consecutive playoff berths (1999–2024) with a won-loss record of 303–49 (.860) over that time, and 16 consecutive district titles (2006–2021). The Eagles claim three national titles (2012, 2013, 2014), two national runner ups (2008, 2017), has 26 seasons of 10 wins or more, and had a streak of 84 regular season wins from 2012 to 2021.

== State championships ==
Allen's first state championship in 2008 was won over Fort Bend Hightower, 21–14. The team's record that year was 15–1, and the state title win gave them a MaxPreps national ranking of 5.

2012 marked the beginning of a record-setting win streak for the Eagles. Allen went 15–1 on the season, only losing to Coppell in week 5. The team finished the season on a 10–0 run, winning the program's second state championship, the 5A Division I championship, 35–21 against Houston Lamar.

The Eagles continued their winning ways in 2013, running off a 16–0 record en route to an undefeated season and their second consecutive 5A Division I championship, 63–28 against Pearland High School.

2014 was a carbon copy undefeated season at 16–0, with the Eagles’ winning their third championship in a row, 6A Division I, 47–16 against Cypress Ranch High School. The team overcame not being able to play on their home field the entire season due to structural damage to their stadium. The championship win made Allen the fourth high school in Texas history to win the football state championship three years in a row, and the first to do so in the state's largest classification.

In 2015, Allen was 10–0 in the regular season and 4–0 in the playoffs, but lost a state semi-final game to Westlake High School (Texas), snapping a program-best 57-game winning streak and end the season at 14–1. The win streak is the second longest for 11-man football in the state, behind 68 games by Celina High School (1998–2002).

The Eagle's fifth state title came in 2017, a 6A Division I championship, by defeating Lake Travis High School 35–33 in the title game. Over the seven seasons from 2012 to 2018, Allen won the state title four times, and reached the final four in the other three seasons.

== State competition ==
State champion
State finalist
State final four
State quarterfinalist

Season	Conf	Dist	Coach	Overall record	District record	Playoff record	UIL Ref
1936	C	3	Frank Smith (4–10)	2-4			
1937	C	3	Frank Smith (4–10)	0–5			
1938	C	10	Frank Smith (4–10)	2–0			
1939	C	10	Frank Smith (4–10)	0–1			
1940	6-Man	4	Jack Murray (10–0)	9–0			
1941	6-Man	4	Jack Murray (10–0)	1–0			
1942	6-Man	11	No season WW II				
1943	6-Man	11	No season WW II				
1944	6-Man	9	No season WW II				
1945	6-Man	9	W.H. Moseley (23–4)	0–1			
1946	6-Man	10	W.H. Moseley (23–4)	4–1		0–1	
1947	6-Man	10	W.H. Moseley (23–4)	4–1		0–1	
1948	6-Man	12	W.H. Moseley (23–4)	9–0		1–0	
1949	6-Man	12	W.H. Moseley (23–4)	6–1		0–1	
1950	6-Man	15	Gene Curtis (33–4–1)	9–1		0–1	
1951	6-Man	15	Gene Curtis (33–4–1)	7–1			
1952	6-Man	14	Gene Curtis (33–4–1)	8–1–1		0–1	
1953	6-Man	14	Gene Curtis (33–4–1)	9–1			
1954	6-Man	14	Lee Roundtree (14–6)	10–1		1–1	
1955	6-Man	14	Lee Roundtree (14–6)	4–5			
1956	6-Man	15	Max Vaughn (68–21–6)	7–2–1		0–1	
1957	6-Man	15	Max Vaughn (68–21–6)	7–2			
1958	8-Man	7	Max Vaughn (68–21–6)	10–0		1–0	
1959	8-Man	7	Max Vaughn (68–21–6)	10–0		1–0	
1960	8-Man	7	Max Vaughn (68–21–6)	12–0		2–0	
1961	8-Man	7	Max Vaughn (68–21–6)	8–2–2			
1962	B	12	Max Vaughn (68–21–6)	9–2–1		1–1	
1963	B	12	Max Vaughn (68–21–6)	0–9–1			
1964	B	10	Max Vaughn (68–21–6)	5–4–1			
1965	B	10	Bob Painter (25–27)	6–5		0–1	
1966	B	9	Bob Painter (25–27)	4–6			
1967	B	9	Bob Painter (25–27)	3–7			
1968	B	12	Bob Painter (25–27)	5–5			
1969	B	12	Bob Painter (25–27)	7–4		0–1	
1970	1A	13	Pete Turman	1–9			
1971	1A	13	Jim Clark (23–16–3)	2–5–3			
1972	1A	16	Jim Clark (23–16–3)	6–4			
1973	1A	16	Jim Clark (23–16–3)	8–4		0–1	
1974	1A	15	Jim Clark (23–16–3)	7–3			
1975	1A	15	John Pearce (50–21–1)	6–4			
1976	2A	12	John Pearce (50–21–1)	6–4			
1977	2A	12	John Pearce (50–21–1)	2–8			
1978	2A	12	John Pearce (50–21–1)	8–2			
1979	2A	12	John Pearce (50–21–1)	9–1			
1980	3A	11	John Pearce (50–21–1)	11–1		1–1	
1981	3A	11	John Pearce (50–21–1)	8–1–1			
1982	4A	5	Ken Purcell (69–66–2)	6–4			
1983	4A	5	Ken Purcell (69–66–2)	10–1		0–1	
1984	4A	7	Ken Purcell (69–66–2)	1–9			
1985	4A	7	Ken Purcell (69–66–2)	3–7			
1986	4A	5	Ken Purcell (69–66–2)	10–3		1–1	
1987	4A	5	Ken Purcell (69–66–2)	10–3		1–1	
1988	4A	9	Ken Purcell (69–66–2)	6–4			
1989	4A	9	Ken Purcell (69–66–2)	5–5			
1990	4A	9	Ken Purcell (69–66–2)	6–4			
1991	4A	9	Ken Purcell (69–66–2)	3–6			
1992	5A	30	Ken Purcell (69–66–2)	5–5			
1993	5A	30	Ken Purcell (69–66–2)	2–7			
1994	5A I	5	Ken Purcell (69–66–2)	2–8			
1995	5A I	5	Todd Graham (35–30–1)	4–5–1			
1996	5A I	10	Todd Graham (35–30–1)	7–5		1–1	
1997	5A I	10	Todd Graham (35–30–1)	4–7		0–1	
1998	5A II	9	Todd Graham (35–30–1)	3–7			
1999	5A II	9	Todd Graham (35–30–1)	8–3		0–1	
2000	5A II	9	Todd Graham (35–30–1)	9–3		1–1	
2001	5A II	9	Joe Martin (31–9)	10–3		2–1	
2002	5A II	9	Joe Martin (31–9)	8–4		1–1	
2003	5A II	9	Joe Martin (31–9)	13–2		4–1	
2004	5A I	8	Tom Westerberg (150–17)	9–3	6–1	1–1	
2005	5A I	8	Tom Westerberg (150–17)	9–3	6–1	1–1	
2006	5A II	9	Tom Westerberg (150–17)	13–2	7–0	4–1	
2007	5A II	9	Tom Westerberg (150–17)	10–1	7–0	0–1	
2008	5A I	8	Tom Westerberg (150–17)	15–1	6–0	6–0	
2009	5A I	8	Tom Westerberg (150–17)	12–2	6–0	1–1	
2010	5A I	8	Tom Westerberg (150–17)	10–2	6–1	1–1	
2011	5A I	8	Tom Westerberg (150–17)	11–1	7–0	1–1	
2012	5A II	10	Tom Westerberg (150–17)	15–1	5–0	6–0	
2013	5A II	10	Tom Westerberg (150–17)	16–0	5–0	6–0	
2014	6A I	6	Tom Westerberg (150–17)	16–0	8–0	6–0	
2015	6A I	6	Tom Westerberg (150–17)	14–1	8–0	4–1	
2016	6A I	6	Terry Gambill (65–4)	14–1	7–0	4–1	
2017	6A I	6	Terry Gambill (65–4)	16–0	7–0	6–0	
2018	6A II	9	Terry Gambill (65–4)	14–1	7–0	4–1	
2019	6A II	9	Terry Gambill (65–4)	11–1	7–0	1–1	
2020	6A I	5	Terry Gambill (65–4)	10–1	6–0	2–1	
2021	6A I	5	Chad Morris	11–3	5–1	3–1	
2022	6A I	5	Lee Wiginton (29–10)	7–4	5–2	0–1	
2023	6A I	5	Lee Wiginton (29–10)	9–5	5–2	3–1	
2024	6A I	6	Lee Wiginton (29–10)	13–1	8–0	3–1	
Totals	6A I			641–257–14	134–8 (Note: District record since 2004. Research into prior records is ongoing.)	82–37	

Additional table references: MaxPreps, Texas High School Football History, and Lone Star Football.

== National rankings ==
- 2008
  - ESPN Rise #1 in the Southwest Region
  - ESPN Rise #2 in the country
  - Yahoo! Rivals High School #2
  - MaxPreps #5
- 2012
  - High School Football America co-national champions with John Curtis from Louisiana
  - CalPreps National Champion
  - Massey Ratings National Champion
- 2013
  - High School Football America national champion
  - Blue Star Media National Runner-Up
- 2014
  - High School Football America national champion
  - Blue Star Media National Champion
  - MaxPreps National Champion
  - National Sports News Service National Champion
- 2017
  - High School Football America national runner-up
- 2018
  - High School Football America national #21
