= Shane Day =

American football coach (born 1974)

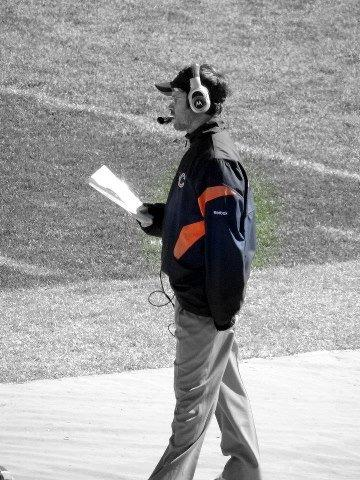
- Day with the Chicago Bears

Los Angeles Chargers
- Title: Passing game coordinator & quarterbacks coach

Personal information
- Born: September 27, 1974 (age 52); Manhattan, Kansas, U.S.

Career information
- Position: Wide receiver
- High school: Manhattan High School
- College: Kansas State

Career history
- Auburn Riverside HS (WA) (2001-2004); Wide receivers coach (2001); Quarterbacks coach (2002); Offensive coordinator & quarterbacks coach (2003-2004); Michigan (2006) Offensive quality control coach; San Francisco 49ers (2007–2009) Offensive quality control coach; Chicago Bears (2010–2011) Quarterbacks coach; Connecticut (2012–2013) Quarterbacks coach; Washington Redskins (2014–2015) Assistant offensive line coach; Miami Dolphins (2016–2018) Tight ends coach; San Francisco 49ers (2019–2020) Quarterbacks coach; Los Angeles Chargers (2021–2022) Passing game coordinator & quarterbacks coach; Houston Texans (2023) Senior offensive assistant; Los Angeles Chargers (2024-present); Quarterbacks coach (2024-2025); Passing game coordinator & quarterbacks coach (2026-present)

Shane Paul Day (born September 27, 1974) is an American football coach who is the quarterbacks coach for the Los Angeles Chargers of the National Football League (NFL). He has previously served as an assistant coach for the Houston Texans, San Francisco 49ers, Miami Dolphins, Washington Redskins, and Chicago Bears. Day has also served as an assistant coach for Connecticut and Michigan.

== Early life ==
Day was a two sport athlete at Rhodes College, playing both football and baseball. He graduated from Kansas State University in 1999 with a degree in English.

== Coaching career ==
=== Auburn Riverside High School ===
In 2001, Day began his coaching career as the wide receivers coach at Auburn Riverside High School. He then spent the next three years as the quarterbacks coach for the high school, as well as taking on the role of offensive coordinator during the final two years.

=== University of Michigan ===
In 2006, Day was hired as an offensive quality control coach at the University of Michigan, where he worked with future NFL quarterback Chad Henne.

=== San Francisco 49ers ===
In 2007, Day was hired by the San Francisco 49ers as an offensive quality control coach. He held the position for three years, two years under offensive coordinator Mike Martz, who later hired Day to work for him in Chicago. Day oversaw the quarterbacks in 2007, running backs in 2008, and the offensive line in 2009. He was also part of the staff that coached the South team during the 2008 Senior Bowl.

=== Chicago Bears ===
On February 5, 2010, Day was hired by the Chicago Bears as their quarterbacks coach. He was recommended for the job by Chicago's offensive coordinator Mike Martz, with whom Day had worked with for two seasons in San Francisco. Day helped the Bears reach the NFC Championship game in 2010.

=== University of Connecticut ===
On January 24, 2012, Day was hired as the quarterbacks coach at the University of Connecticut, replacing Joe Moorhead, who had left for the head coach position at Fordham University. Day called plays for the Husky offense the final 3 games of 2013 in which the offense took off, setting several school records, and leading to 3 consecutive wins against Temple, Rutgers, and Memphis.

=== Washington Redskins ===
On January 23, 2014, Day was hired by the Washington Redskins as their assistant offensive line coach.

=== Miami Dolphins ===
On January 12, 2016, Day was hired by the Miami Dolphins as their tight ends coach.

=== San Francisco 49ers (second stint) ===
In 2019, Day returned to the San Francisco 49ers after he was hired as their quarterbacks coach under head coach Kyle Shanahan.

=== Los Angeles Chargers ===
On January 28, 2021, Day was hired to be the Los Angeles Chargers quarterbacks coach. On the heels of a Chargers loss in their AFC Wild Card game against the Jacksonville Jaguars where they blew a 27–point lead, he and offensive coordinator Joe Lombardi were both fired on January 17, 2023.

=== Houston Texans ===
On February 19, 2023, Day was hired to be the Houston Texans' senior offensive assistant.

=== Los Angeles Chargers (second stint) ===
On February 8, 2024, Day was hired to return to the Los Angeles Chargers as quarterbacks coach under new head coach Jim Harbaugh.

On May 21, 2026, after Marcus Brady followed Jesse Minter to the Baltimore Ravens, Day was promoted to the position of passing game coordinator, having previously served in the same capacity from 2021-2022. He remains the Chargers' quarterbacks coach.

== Personal life ==
Day is married to his wife, Christie. They have one daughter.
