= Chad Morris =

American football coach (born 1968)

Current position
- Title: Offensive coordinator
- Team: Clemson
- Conference: ACC

Biographical details
- Born: December 4, 1968 (age 57); Edgewood, Texas, U.S.
- Education: Texas A&M University

Coaching career (HC unless noted)
- 1994–1997: Eustace HS (TX)
- 1998–1999: Elysian Fields HS (TX)
- 2000–2002: Bay City HS (TX)
- 2003–2007: Stephenville HS (TX)
- 2008–2009: Lake Travis HS (TX)
- 2010: Tulsa (AHC/OC/QB)
- 2011–2014: Clemson (OC/QB)
- 2015–2017: SMU
- 2018–2019: Arkansas
- 2020: Auburn (OC/QB)
- 2021: Allen HS (TX)
- 2022: South Florida (off. analyst)
- 2023: Clemson (off. analyst)
- 2024: Texas State (WR/PGC)
- 2026–present: Clemson (OC)

Head coaching record
- Overall: 18–40 (college); 178–43 (high school)

Chad Allen Morris (born December 4, 1968) is an American football coach. Since January 2026, he has been the offensive coordinator at Clemson, a role he previously held from 2011 to 2014. He was previously the wide receivers coach and passing game coordinator at Texas State University. He served as the head football coach at Southern Methodist University (SMU) from 2015 to 2017 and the University of Arkansas from 2018 to 2019.

== Coaching career ==
=== High School ===
Prior to his collegiate coaching career, he was a high school head coach in Texas for 16 seasons compiling a 169–38 record (.816 winning overall). Most recently he was the head coach of the Lake Travis High School football team from 2008 to 2009. He coached the team, starring quarterback Garrett Gilbert, to back-to-back 16–0, state title seasons.

=== Tulsa ===
Morris made the move to college in 2010 when he became the offensive coordinator and associate head coach at the University of Tulsa. He would spend only one season at Tulsa before moving to Clemson University as offensive coordinator.

=== Clemson (first stint) ===
The 2 years prior to Morris' arrival, Clemson went a combined 15–12, including a record of 6–7 in 2010. Morris introduced a hurry-up, spread offense that helped Clemson to a 42–11 mark over the next four seasons. In December 2011, Morris became tied with Gus Malzahn as the highest paid assistant in college football after Clemson University gave Morris a six-year contract worth $1.3 million annually.

In December 2012, Morris interviewed for the Texas Tech head coaching vacancy, which had been created by the departure of Tommy Tuberville for Cincinnati. However, the job would be filled by Texas A&M offensive coordinator, and Texas Tech alumnus, Kliff Kingsbury.

=== SMU ===
Morris got his first opportunity to head coach at the collegiate level when he became head coach at the Southern Methodist University on December 1, 2014. Morris' first two classes of recruits at SMU were all from Texas high schools, making SMU the only school in the country with all-Texas recruiting classes during that time. Morris completed his tenure at SMU compiling a 14–22 record over 3 seasons. Morris improved his record each year at SMU going 2–10 in 2015, 5–7 in 2016 and 7–5 in 2017.

=== Arkansas ===
On December 6, 2017, Morris was hired as the head coach of the Arkansas Razorbacks, signing a six-year, $21 million contract. In his first year, Morris led the Razorbacks to a 2–10 record, notching the team's first ten-loss season in school history. This included a winless record in SEC play.

After a 2–8 start to the 2019 season and a 45–19 loss to Group of 5 opponent Western Kentucky, Arkansas dismissed Morris in his second season. All four of his wins as head coach were over Group of Five (Tulsa, Colorado State) or FCS (Eastern Illinois, Portland State) competition. To date, he is the only full-time Razorback coach to have left the school without a conference win. His 4–18 record is the worst record for a non-interim coach in Arkansas history.

=== Auburn ===
On December 10, 2019, Gus Malzahn hired Morris to serve as the offensive coordinator and quarterbacks coach at Auburn. Auburn fired Malzahn following the 2020 season. New head coach Bryan Harsin did not retain Morris, instead hiring Mike Bobo.

=== Clemson (second stint) ===
On January 5, 2026, Morris returned to Clemson as its offensive coordinator.

== Personal life ==
Morris went to Edgewood High School in Edgewood, Texas, where he was the quarterback of the Bulldogs. He attended Texas A&M and earned a bachelor's degree in mathematics with a minor in statistics in 1992. Morris did not play football at the collegiate level. He and his wife, Paula, have two children, a daughter, Mackenzie, and son, Chandler, who played football at Oklahoma and TCU before transferring to North Texas following the 2023 season. Chandler Morris transferred from North Texas to Virginia following the 2024 season and was the Cavaliers' starting quarterback in 2025.

== Head coaching record ==
=== College ===
Year	Team	Overall	Conference	Standing	Bowl/playoffs
SMU Mustangs (American Athletic Conference) (2015–2017)
2015	SMU	2–10	1–7	T–5th (West)	
2016	SMU	5–7	3–5	5th (West)	
2017	SMU	7–5 (Note: Morris served as SMU's head coach for the 2017 regular season before resigning to take the head coaching job at the University of Arkansas. Sonny Dykes coached the Mustangs in the 2017 Frisco Bowl. SMU finished the season with an overall record of 7–6.)	4–4	T–3rd (West)	Frisco
SMU:		14–22	8–16	* Departed SMU for Arkansas before bowl game	
Arkansas Razorbacks (Southeastern Conference) (2018–2019)
2018	Arkansas	2–10	0–8	7th (Western)	
2019	Arkansas	2–8 (Note: Morris served as Arkansas's head coach for the first ten games of the 2019 season before he was fired. Special teams coordinator and tight ends coach Barry Lunney Jr. was appointed as interim head coach for the last two games of the season. Arkansas finished the year with an overall record of 2–10 and a conference mark of 0–8, placing last out of seven teams in the Western Division of the Southeastern Conference.)	0–6	(Western)	
Arkansas:		4–18	0–14		
Total:		18–40			

=== High school ===
Year	Team	Overall	Conference	Standing	Bowl/playoffs
Eustace Bulldogs (UIL) (1994–1997)
1994	Eustace	5–5			
1995	Eustace	5–5			
1996	Eustace	5–5			
1997	Eustace	11–1		1st	
Eustace:		26–16			
Elysian Fields Yellow Jackets () (1998–1999)
1998	Elysian Fields	12–4		2nd	
1999	Elysian Fields	14–2		1st	
Elysian Fields:		26–6			
Bay City Blackcats () (2000–2002)
2000	Bay City	14–1		1st	
2001	Bay City	14–2		1st	
2002	Bay City	6–5		3rd	
Bay City:		34–8			
Stephenville Yellow Jackets () (2003–2007)
2003	Stephenville	6–4			
2004	Stephenville	10–1	5–0	1st	
2005	Stephenville	13–1	5–0	1st	
2006	Stephenville	10–2	6–1	3rd	
2007	Stephenville	10–2	6–1	2nd	
Stephenville:		49–10			
Lake Travis Cavaliers () (2008–2009)
2008	Lake Travis	16–0	6–0	1st	
2009	Lake Travis	16–0	6–0	1st	
Lake Travis:		32–0	12–0		
Allen Eagles (UIL) (2021)
2021	Allen	11–3	5–1	1st	
Allen:		11–3	5–1		
Total:		178–43			
National championship Conference title Conference division title or championship game berth
