= Joshua Moore (American football) =

American football player (born 1988)

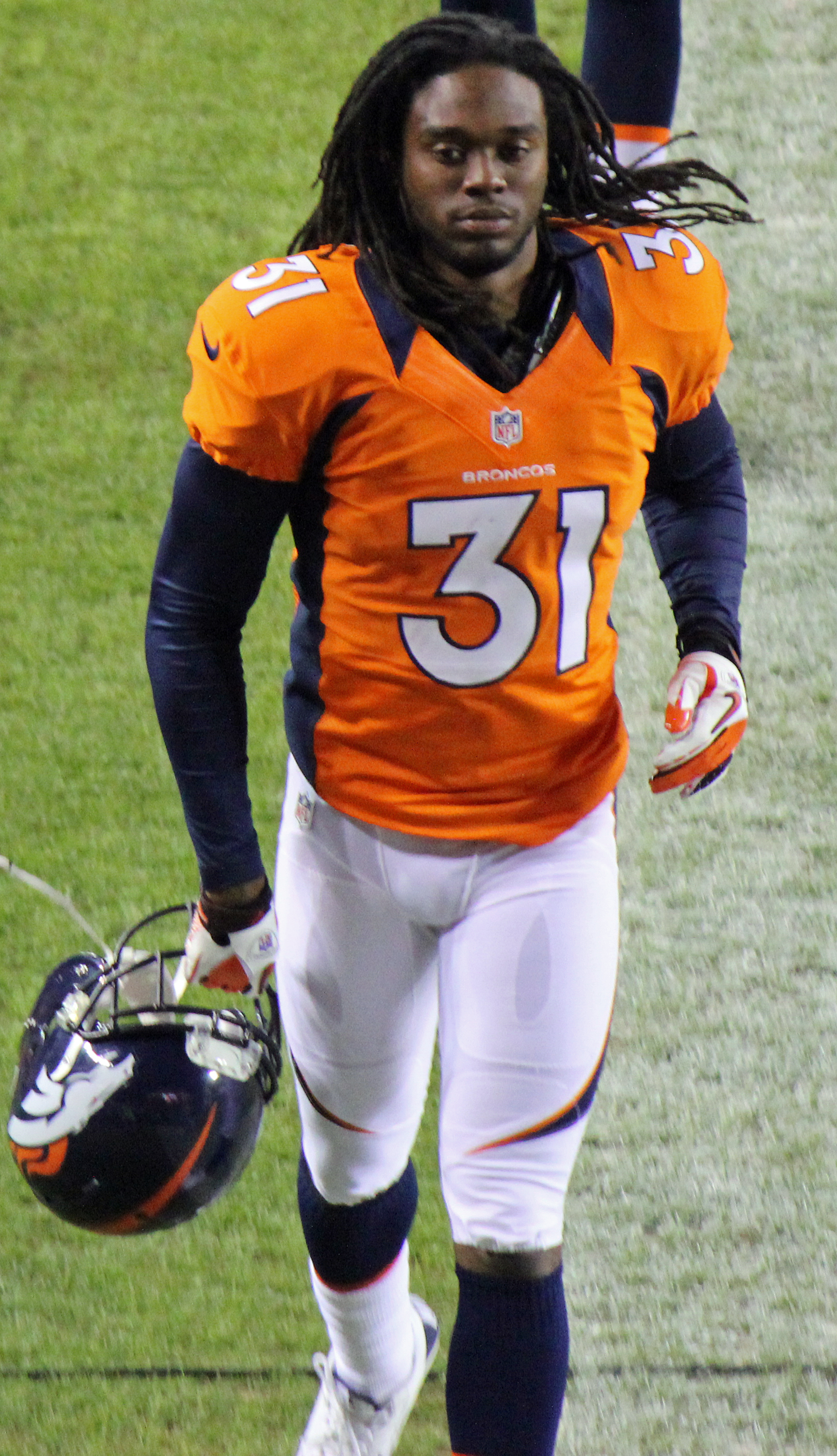
- Moore with the Denver Broncos in 2012

No. 31
- Position: Cornerback

Personal information
- Born: August 20, 1988 (age 38); Ft. Lauderdale, Florida, U.S.
- Listed height: 5 ft 11 in (1.80 m)
- Listed weight: 184 lb (83 kg)

Career information
- High school: Blanche Ely (Pompano Beach, Florida)
- College: Kansas State
- NFL draft: 2010: 5th round, 141st overall pick

Career history
- Chicago Bears (2010–2011); Denver Broncos (2012)*
- * Offseason or practice squad member only

Career NFL statistics
- Total tackles: 1
- Stats at Pro Football Reference

Joshua J. Moore (born August 20, 1988) is an American former professional football player who was a cornerback for the Chicago Bears of the National Football League (NFL). He played college football for the Kansas State Wildcats and was selected by the Bears in the fifth round of the 2010 NFL draft.
