= Mike Martz =

American football coach (born 1951)

Personal information
- Born: May 13, 1951 (age 75); Sioux Falls, South Dakota, U.S.

Career information
- High school: James Madison (San Diego, California)
- College: Fresno State
- NFL draft: 1973: undrafted

Career history
- Bullard HS (CA) (1973) Assistant coach; San Diego Mesa (1974) Assistant coach; San Jose State (1975) Assistant coach; San Diego Mesa (1976–1977) Assistant coach; Santa Ana (1978) Assistant coach; Fresno State (1979) Assistant coach; Pacific (CA) (1980–1981) Assistant coach; Minnesota (1982) Assistant coach; Arizona State (1983–1991); Quarterbacks coach & wide receivers coach (1983–1987); Offensive assistant (1988–1991); Los Angeles/St. Louis Rams (1992–1996); Quarterbacks coach (1992–1994); Wide receivers coach (1995–1996); Washington Redskins (1997–1998) Quarterbacks coach; St. Louis Rams (1999–2005); Offensive coordinator (1999); Head coach (2000–2005); Detroit Lions (2006–2007) Offensive coordinator; San Francisco 49ers (2008) Offensive coordinator; Chicago Bears (2010–2011) Offensive coordinator; San Diego Fleet (2019) Head coach

Awards and highlights
- Super Bowl champion (XXXIV)

Head coaching record
- Regular season: 53–32 (.624)
- Postseason: 3–4 (.429)
- Career: 56–36 (.609)
- Coaching profile at Pro Football Reference

Michael Martz (born May 13, 1951) is an American football coach. Best known for his coaching tenure with the St. Louis Rams of the National Football League (NFL), he served as the offensive coordinator for the Rams' Greatest Show on Turf offense in 1999 that led the franchise to its first Super Bowl title in Super Bowl XXXIV. Martz subsequently served as the head coach of the Rams from 2000 to 2005, where his teams reached the playoffs four times, won two division titles, and achieved a franchise-best 14–2 record in 2001 en route to an appearance in Super Bowl XXXVI.

== Early career ==
Martz played tight end at San Diego Mesa College, University of California, Santa Barbara, and Fresno State University and graduated summa cum laude from Washington University in St. Louis in 1972. The following year his coaching career began at Bullard High School in Fresno, California. From 1974 to 1991, he was an assistant coach at seven colleges and universities, including two stints as offensive coordinator at Arizona State University.

In 1992, Martz was hired as quarterback coach for the Los Angeles Rams and held that post through 1994. In 1995, when the team moved to St. Louis, he served as wide receivers coach in 1995–96. Under his teaching, Isaac Bruce exploded onto the NFL scene, going from 21 receptions in 1994 to 119 and 1,781 yards in 1995 and being voted to his first Pro Bowl in 1996.

Martz left the Rams in 1997 to become quarterback coach at the Washington Redskins and helped develop Trent Green, who signed to be Rams QB in 1999, the season Martz was hired to be the offensive coordinator.

== NFL coaching career ==
=== St. Louis Rams ===
In 1999, Martz returned to the Rams as Dick Vermeil's offensive coordinator. During the season, Martz's number one ranked offense scored 526 points, the fourth highest in NFL history, en route to returning the Rams to the playoffs after a 10-year absence and winning Super Bowl XXXIV Regarding Martz's impact on the season, Vermeil stated, "I can't think, in my history of coaching, of any assistant who came into an NFL franchise and made the immediate impact that Mike Martz did." Vermeil further added, "Kurt Warner came off the street, and he made him NFL player of the year...I have great respect for him, and I think he has great respect for me. We took a team to the Super Bowl. Without him we don't go."

Quarterback Marc Bulger said about Martz, "He was by far the smartest football mind I've ever been around. The things he was teaching was so far ahead of what others were teaching."

==== Head coach ====
Vermeil retired on February 2, 2000 (although he soon returned to coach the Kansas City Chiefs), and Martz was promoted to the head coaching position that same day. He led the Rams to a 10–6 regular season record, but they lost in the 1st round of the playoffs to the New Orleans Saints 31–28.

2001 saw the Rams cruise to a 14–2 record (with Martz's signature, fast-paced, quick-striking offense—nicknamed "the Greatest Show on Turf" by the media—quarterbacked by two-time league MVP Kurt Warner) and the NFC West title. Martz's Rams went on to win the NFC Championship against the Philadelphia Eagles to set up a matchup in Super Bowl XXXVI against the New England Patriots. In a game where they were favored by two touchdowns, the Rams lost in a 20-17 upset. Martz was questioned for sticking with a passing attack despite New England sending in extra defensive backs for plays that had them "latch on to the receivers and hang on"; star running back Marshall Faulk ran for just 17 carries for 76 yards while Warner threw two interceptions (one returned for a touchdown). In 2002, the Rams had a see-saw season in which Warner played despite injuries to his throwing hand that saw him commit an unusually high number of turnovers. Faulk was no longer the factor he had been in previous years—although many critics blamed this on Martz's tendency to emphasize pass plays at the expense of running plays. By this point, Martz clashed with team president of football operations Jay Zygmunt over personnel decisions.

In 2003, Marc Bulger's first full year as a starter, the Rams fielded a much-improved defense under defensive coordinator Lovie Smith and led the NFL in forced turnovers, and they posted a 12–4 regular season record and made the playoffs. However, the Rams lost at home in the NFC divisional playoffs to the Carolina Panthers in a game that would have put them in the NFC title game. In that game, the Rams had the ball on the Panthers' 15-yard line with 42 seconds remaining and trailing by three points. Rather than go for the win in regulation, Martz made the controversial decision to run out the clock and settle for a game-tying field goal and overtime. The decision proved costly for the Rams as they lost in double overtime.

In 2004, the Rams got off to a slow start and Martz's popularity with the fans began to wane; the "online community" was particularly hostile. Despite the early struggles, a late-season rally combined with a weak NFC West allowed the Rams to sneak into the playoffs as a wild-card with an 8–8 record. They had to overcome an unusual number of injuries, but still managed to beat the Seattle Seahawks in the first round of the playoffs—making NFL history by becoming the first team with a non-winning (regular season) record to win a postseason game. The Rams would go on to lose to the Falcons in the divisional round. The loss of defensive coordinator Lovie Smith, who left to become head coach of the Chicago Bears—and took two of his assistant coaches with him—impacted the team's performance on the field. Draft picks overseen by Martz such as Trung Canidate not panning out did little to help matters.

On October 10, 2005, Martz took a leave of absence from the Rams to treat a persistent bacterial infection in his heart. His assistant head coach, Joe Vitt, became the interim coach for the rest of the season, and offensive coordinator Steve Fairchild chose the offensive plays. Martz told the Rams that after being examined and evaluated by his treating physician (Dr. Victoria Fraser), his illness would prevent him from performing his duties. Martz immediately announced that he would miss the rest of the season.

Martz allegedly had several conflicts with the Rams' front office over the years, which reportedly came to a climax in 2005, as well. While Martz was watching a Rams game on live television while recuperating at home, Team President John Shaw prevented him from relaying a play call to Fairchild by phone. Despite being on leave, Martz also periodically appeared in-person at team practices late in the season. Martz was given medical clearance to coach the Rams' last regular season game, on New Year's Day, 2006; however, management refused to let him do so, and fired him the day after that game.

=== Detroit Lions ===
Martz interviewed for head coaching vacancies in Oakland and New Orleans. After the interview, he withdrew his candidacy for the position in Oakland. After initially rejecting an offer due to financial considerations, on February 8, 2006, Martz accepted an offer from the Detroit Lions to be their offensive coordinator and their quarterbacks coach.

In 2006, his first season, the passing game improved considerably, ranking 7th overall behind quarterback Jon Kitna, who had his first 4,000-yard season at age 34. Detroit lost its first five games with Martz and finished 3–13 in his first season as coordinator. Though the offense obviously had its woes, Martz wasn't blamed for very much of the team's issues, as the defense was also bad and there were various injury and personnel issues.

In 2007, expectations were high despite the previous year's disaster, and it appeared Martz's system was actually beginning to work. The Lions looked to be playoff contenders, almost in competition with Green Bay for the division title at mid-season when they sat comfortably at 6–2. Though Kitna was still sacked far too much during this span due mostly due to seven step drops and his inability to quickly read defenses, it was still a great improvement from the year before, and sacks aside, Detroit possessed a decent passing game. Shaun McDonald was their leading receiver with 943 yards. However, the team won only one more game that season and finished 7–9. When even players began to complain of Martz's pass-happy and unbalanced offense, the Lions fired him in the offseason. However, the following season the Lions plummeted in the offensive rankings, and some players (most notably Kitna) were openly frustrated with the conservative play calling that replaced Martz' system as the Lions became the first ever 0–16 team after firing Martz.

=== San Francisco 49ers ===
On January 8, 2008, Martz signed a two-year deal to become the offensive coordinator of the San Francisco 49ers, who hoped that a fourth offensive coordinator in four years could re-energize the offense (and, most notably, quarterback Alex Smith's career).

Smith would injure his shoulder in the preseason, however, and miss the entire 2008 season. Martz lobbied for journeyman J. T. O'Sullivan to come in as his replacement, but O'Sullivan and the 49ers offense struggled in the first half of the season. After 49ers head coach Mike Nolan was fired and Mike Singletary was brought in as interim head coach, the team gave Shaun Hill a chance to establish himself as the starting quarterback.

Martz was let go as offensive coordinator after the 49ers named Singletary head coach. Singletary reportedly wanted more of a ball-control, run-oriented offense than Martz is known for crafting. San Francisco ranked 23rd out of 32 teams in points scored, 24th in total yards, 13th in passing yards per game and 22nd in net passing yards per attempt, which represents an improvement over 2007 (when San Francisco ranked dead last in all three categories), but they ranked 26th in rushing yards and last in total turnovers. However, in 2007 the 49ers only turned the ball over one fewer time than in 2008 under Martz.

=== Chicago Bears ===
On February 1, 2010, Martz was hired by the Chicago Bears as their offensive coordinator. During his first year in Chicago, the Bears offense was 28th in passing and 22nd in rushing despite having no significant injuries as the Bears made the playoffs and fell seven points short of the Super Bowl.

Martz was known for aggressive play-calling, and the calls for a pass-happy offense led to quarterback Jay Cutler getting repeatedly sacked. The issue caused Cutler to curse at Martz on-air in a game against the Minnesota Vikings in 2011. Ironically, offensive statistics revealed the Bears had a more balanced offense that leaned toward the run as they were ranked ninth in the NFL in rushing, ninth in rushing attempts, and 27th in passing attempts.

On January 3, 2012, Martz resigned his position with the Bears. He reportedly departed over philosophical differences with Bears head coach Lovie Smith. Martz's final year was marked by a 7–3 start until season-ending injuries to quarterback Cutler and running back Matt Forte. On January 16, he announced his retirement from coaching.

Martz eventually became an analyst for Fox Sports. He interviewed for the Cleveland Browns' offensive coordinator position after the 2014 season, but did not get the job.

From 2015 to 2018, Martz served as the head coach of the National Team for the NFLPA Collegiate Bowl, which features some of the nation's top draft-eligible players. Martz's team won in each of his four appearances as head coach.

== Alliance of American Football ==
The Alliance of American Football named Martz the head coach of the San Diego Fleet in 2018, making Martz the first person to coach a professional football team in the city of San Diego since Mike McCoy coached the Chargers' last season there in 2016. The Fleet opened the 2019 AAF season with a 15–6 loss to the San Antonio Commanders. A week later, Martz and the Fleet recorded their first win in a 24–12 victory over the Atlanta Legends.

== Personal life ==
Martz married his James Madison High School sweetheart Julie in 1971.

== In popular culture ==
Martz was portrayed by actor Chance Kelly in the 2021 film American Underdog about Kurt Warner, who played quarterback for Martz between 1999 and 2003.

== Head coaching record ==
=== NFL ===
Team	Year	Regular season					Postseason			
Team	Year	Won	Lost	Ties	Win %	Finish	Won	Lost	Win %	Result
STL	2000	10	6	0	.563	2nd in NFC West	0	1	.000	Lost to New Orleans Saints in NFC Wild Card Game
STL	2001	14	2	0	.875	1st in NFC West	2	1	.667	Lost to New England Patriots in Super Bowl XXXVI
STL	2002	7	9	0	.438	2nd in NFC West	–	–	–	–
STL	2003	12	4	0	.750	1st in NFC West	0	1	.000	Lost to Carolina Panthers in NFC Divisional Game
STL	2004	8	8	0	.500	2nd in NFC West	1	1	.500	Lost to Atlanta Falcons in NFC Divisional Game
STL	2005	2	3	0	.400	2nd in NFC West	–	–	–	–
STL Total		53	32	0	.624		3	4	.429	
Total		53	32	0	.624		3	4	.429	

=== AAF ===
Team	Year	Regular season					Postseason			
Team	Year	Won	Lost	Ties	Win %	Finish	Won	Lost	Win %	Result
SD	2019	3	4	0	.429		–	–	–	–
SD total		3	4	0	.429		–	–	–	–
Total		3	4	0	.429		–	–	–	–
