= Victoria J. Fraser =

American physician

Victoria J. Fraser is an American physician.

Fraser graduated from William Woods College before earning a medical degree from the University of Missouri School of Medicine. After completing her residency at the University of Colorado Health Sciences Center, she joined the Washington University School of Medicine faculty in 1991. Fraser was subsequently named J. William Campbell Professor of Medicine, serving until her appointment as Adolphus Busch Professor of Medicine and department chair in 2012.
