= Levi Horn =

American gridiron football player (born 1986)

Levi C. Horn
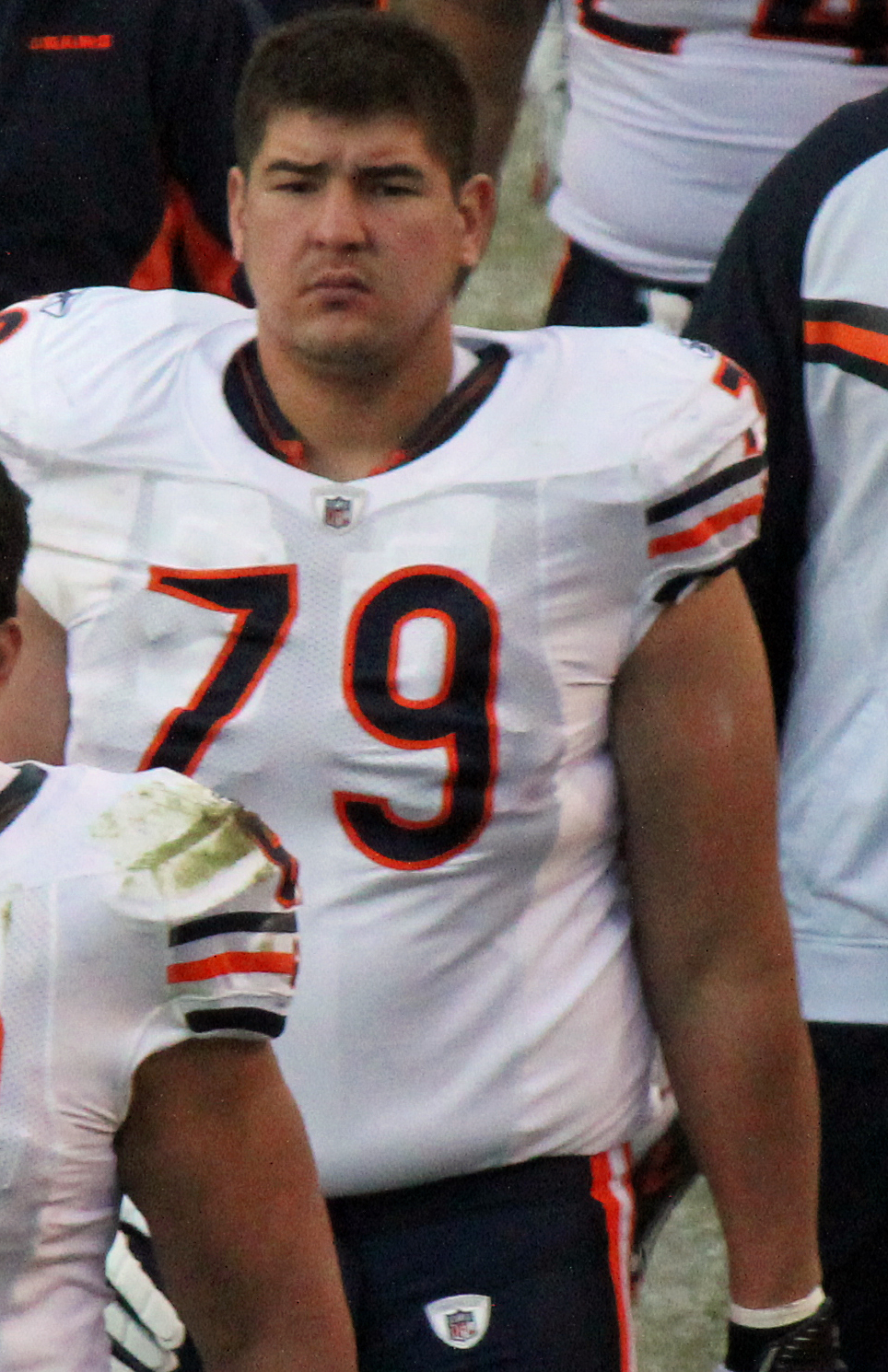
- Horn in 2011

No. 79
- Position: Offensive tackle

Personal information
- Born: October 2, 1986 (age 40); Spokane, Washington, U.S.
- Listed height: 6 ft 7 in (2.01 m)
- Listed weight: 315 lb (143 kg)

Career information
- High school: John R. Rogers (Spokane)
- College: Montana
- NFL draft: 2010: undrafted

Career history
- Chicago Bears (2010–2011); Minnesota Vikings (2012)*; Spokane Shock (2013)*; BC Lions (2013)*; Spokane Shock (2014)*; New Mexico Stars (2014); Los Angeles Kiss (2014)
- * Offseason or practice squad member only

Awards and highlights
- First-team FCS All-American (2009); All-Big Sky (2009) (unanimous)
- Stats at Pro Football Reference
- Stats at CFL.ca (archive)
- Stats at ArenaFan.com

Levi C. Horn (born October 2, 1986) is an American former professional football offensive tackle. He played college football for the Oregon Ducks and the Montana Grizzlies, where he was a unanimous All-Big Sky Conference player and an FCS All-American. Horn was signed by the Chicago Bears of the National Football League (NFL) as an undrafted free agent in 2010.

== Early life ==
Horn graduated from John R. Rogers High School in Spokane, Washington in 2005. He was a Class 4A first-team all-state tight end by the Associated Press and WashingtonPreps.com.

He redshirted at University of Oregon while moving from tight end to offensive tackle. He left after the 2005 season along with three other players citing a desire for more playing time. He then transferred to the University of Montana. He was a first-team All-Big Sky Conference selection while at Montana. He was a unanimous selection to the 2009 All-Big Sky Conference team. He was also an NCAA Division I Football Championship Subdivision All-American selection: American Football Coaches Association (first-team), Associated Press (third-team), and The Sports Network (third-team).

== Professional career ==
=== Chicago Bears ===
After going undrafted in the 2010 NFL draft, Horn signed with the Chicago Bears as an undrafted free agent on April 25, 2010. He was waived on September 4, 2010, and signed to the Bears' practice squad the next day. On January 4, 2011, Horn signed a future contract with the Bears. Horn was released on September 3, 2011, but he was signed to the practice squad the next day. On November 18, he was activated from the practice squad when Gabe Carimi was placed on injured reserve. The Bears waived Horn on May 14, 2012.

=== Minnesota Vikings ===
Horn signed with the Minnesota Vikings on May 18, 2012. On August 25, 2012, he was released by the Vikings.

=== 2013 ===
Horn signed with the Spokane Shock of the Arena Football League on March 14, 2013. He signed with the BC Lions of the Canadian Football League on March 26, 2013.

=== 2014 ===
In 2014 Horn played four games for the New Mexico Stars of the Lone Star Football League before signing with the expansion Los Angeles Kiss of the Arena League in late April. The Kiss placed him on recallable reassignment on May 5. Later that month, he returned to the New Mexico Stars.

== Personal life ==
Horn is a registered member of the Northern Cheyenne Tribe and has been active in the Native American community. He was a spokesman for Michelle Obama's Let's Move! campaign.
