= Jimmy Saddler-McQueen =

American football player (born 1987)

No. 66, 63
- Position: Defensive tackle

Personal information
- Born: August 4, 1987 (age 39); Houston, Texas, U.S.
- Listed height: 6 ft 2 in (1.88 m)
- Listed weight: 299 lb (136 kg)

Career information
- High school: Houston (TX) Forest Brook
- College: Texas A&M–Kingsville
- NFL draft: 2010: undrafted

Career history
- Chicago Bears (2010)*; Dallas Cowboys (2010)*; St. Louis Rams (2010)*; Dallas Cowboys (2010); St. Louis Rams (2010−2011)*; Dallas Cowboys (2011)*; Tampa Bay Storm (2012); Jacksonville Sharks (2012); Orlando Predators (2012); Houston Texans (2012); Detroit Lions (2012–2013)
- * Offseason or practice squad member only

Career AFL statistics
- Total tackles: 5
- Sacks: 1
- Stats at ArenaFan.com
- Stats at Pro Football Reference

Jimmy Saddler-McQueen (born August 4, 1987) is an American former professional football player who was a defensive tackle in the National Football League (NFL) and Arena Football League (AFL). He was signed by the Chicago Bears as an undrafted free agent in 2010 and was signed to the Detroit Lions practice squad on October 3, 2012.

Saddler-McQueen attended Forest Brook High School in Houston, Texas, and played college football at Texas A&M-Kingsville.

In addition to the Bears and the Lions, he has been a member of the St. Louis Rams, Dallas Cowboys, Tampa Bay Storm, and Jacksonville Sharks.

== Professional career ==
=== Pre-draft measurables ===
Pre-draft measurables
Height	Weight	40-yard dash	10-yard split	20-yard split	20-yard shuttle	Three-cone drill	Vertical jump	Broad jump	Bench press
6 ft 3 3/8 in (1.91 m)	296 lb (134 kg)	5.07 s	1.73 s	2.93 s	4.83 s	8.20 s	31 1/2 in (0.80 m)	8 ft 11 in (2.72 m)	21 reps
All values from Texas AM-Kingsville Pro Day .

=== Chicago Bears ===
After going undrafted in the 2010 NFL draft, Saddler-McQueen signed with the Chicago Bears as an undrafted free agent on April 25, 2010. He was waived on July 21, 2010.

=== First stint with Cowboys ===
Saddler-McQueen signed with the Dallas Cowboys on July 29, 2010. After training camp and the preseason, the Cowboys cut him during the roster cuts.

=== First stint with Rams ===
Saddler-McQueen was signed to Rams practice squad on October 4, 2010. On October 28, 2010, he was deleted from the Rams' practice squad and then added again on October 28, 2010.

=== Second stint with Cowboys ===
The Cowboys re-signed Saddler-McQueen on November 10, 2010. He played in his first career game on November 14, 2010, against the New York Giants. He was later cut on November 29, 2010.

=== Second stint with Rams ===
The Rams again signed Saddler-McQueen to their practice squad on December 14, 2010. He was then signed to a future contract by the St. Louis Rams on January 4, 2011.

=== Third stint with Cowboys ===
On August 1, 2011, Dallas claimed Saddler-McQueen off waivers.

=== Tampa Bay Storm ===
Saddler-McQueen played for the Storm in 2012, appearing in four games. He recorded 5 tackles and a pass breakup in Week 4 against the Jacksonville Sharks.

=== Jacksonville Sharks ===
On May 17, 2012, Saddler-McQueen was signed by the Sharks.

=== Houston Texans ===
The Houston Texans signed Saddler-McQueen on August 4, 2012.

=== Detroit Lions ===
The Detroit Lions signed Saddler-McQueen to their practice squad on October 3, 2012. The Lions waived former Alabama standout Lorenzo Washington to make room on the roster.
