= Texas vs The Nation =

Former college football All-star bowl game

Texas vs The Nation (defunct)
- Stadium: Eagle Stadium (2013); Alamodome (2011); Sun Bowl (2007–2010)
- Location: Allen, Texas (2013); San Antonio, Texas (2011); El Paso, Texas (2007–2010)
- Operated: 2007–2011, 2013

Texas vs The Nation was an American college football all-star bowl game played from 2007 to 2013. Originally played at the Sun Bowl, the format of the game pitted 50 top-rated college seniors who played college or high school football in Texas against a squad of 50 top-rated seniors from the other 49 states. In its first year, 73% of players who participated in the game were signed by National Football League (NFL) teams. In 2011, the game moved from El Paso to San Antonio, and the National Football League Players Association (NFLPA) became the named sponsor of the game. In 2012, the NFLPA began its own all-star game, the NFLPA Collegiate Bowl, and the Texas vs The Nation game was not held. The game was revived in 2013 at Eagle Stadium in Allen, but did not return in 2014.

== Game results ==
Date	Winning team	Score	Team Texas coach	Team Nation coach	Site	Attendance	Notes
February 2, 2007	Team Nation	24–20	Mike Price	Buddy Ryan	Sun Bowl; El Paso, TX	21,528	
February 2, 2008	Team Texas	41–14	Gene Stallings	Buddy Ryan	Sun Bowl; El Paso, TX	26,821	
January 31, 2009	Team Nation	27–24	Gene Stallings	Howard Schnellenberger	Sun Bowl; El Paso, TX	42,387	
February 6, 2010	Team Texas	36–17	Bill Bates	Howard Schnellenberger	Sun Bowl; El Paso, TX	26,041	
February 5, 2011	Team Texas	13–7	Bill Bates	Jerry Glanville	Alamodome; San Antonio, TX		
February 2, 2013	Team Nation	24–13	Bill Bates	Howard Schnellenberger	Eagle Stadium; Allen, TX		

== Game MVPs ==
Year	Name	Position	College	Notes
2007	Ryan Moore	WR	Miami (FL)	
2008	Xavier Omon	RB	Northwest Missouri State	
2009	Frantz Joseph	LB	Florida Atlantic	
2010	Cornelius Brown	CB	UTEP	
2011	Taylor Potts	QB	Texas Tech	
2013	Ryan Griffin	QB	Tulane	
