= Cornelius Brown (American football) =

American gridiron football player (born 1988)

No. 39
- Position: Cornerback

Personal information
- Born: February 26, 1988 (age 38); Houston, Texas, U.S.
- Listed height: 5 ft 11 in (1.80 m)
- Listed weight: 198 lb (90 kg)

Career information
- High school: Forest Brook (Houston)
- College: UTEP
- NFL draft: 2010: undrafted

Career history
- Chicago Bears (2010)*; Indianapolis Colts (2010–2011); Chicago Bears (2012)*; San Diego Chargers (2013)*; Hamilton Tiger-Cats (2014)*
- * Offseason or practice squad member only

Awards and highlights
- Texas vs The Nation MVP (2010)

Career NFL statistics
- Total tackles: 24
- Pass deflections: 3
- Stats at Pro Football Reference

Cornelius Brown (born February 26, 1988) is an American former professional football player who was a cornerback in the National Football League (NFL) for the Indianapolis Colts in 2010. He played college football for the UTEP Miners.

== Early life and college ==
Brown was born in Houston, Texas, and attended Forest Brook High School. Brown was a four-year letterman for the Miners at the University of Texas at El Paso. He played 48 career games at defensive back and totaled 130 tackles. He also had 24 passes defensed, which is tied for second-most in school history, and was the MVP of the Texas vs The Nation game played on February 6, 2010.

== Professional career ==
Brown was signed as a free agent with the Chicago Bears on April 25, 2010, before being waived on September 4, 2010. He was signed to the Indianapolis Colts practice squad two days later, on September 6. He was signed as a free agent for the Colts on November 1, 2010. With the 2010 Indianapolis Colts, Brown played in 10 NFL games, registering 22 total tackles (17 solo). He also returned five kicks, for a total of 102 yards.

Brown later rejoined the Bears on June 15, 2012. He was waived by Chicago on August 31. On April 8, 2013, Brown was signed by the San Diego Chargers. He was signed to the practice roster of the Hamilton Tiger-Cats of the Canadian Football League (CFL) on June 23, 2014. He was released by the Tiger-Cats on November 14, 2014.
