= Antonio Robinson =

American football player (born 1985)

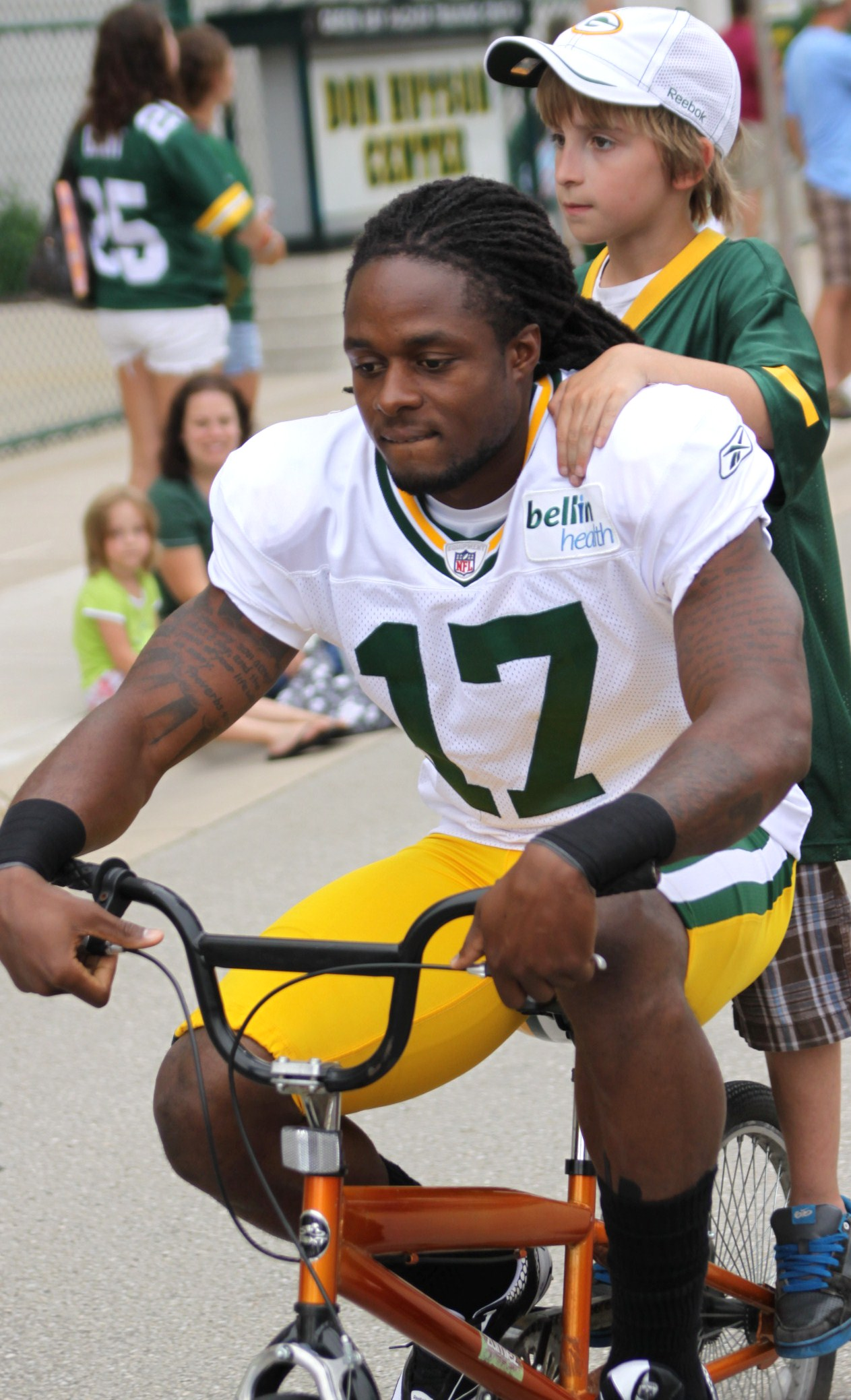
- Robinson with the Packers in 2011

No. 17, 12, 82
- Position: Wide receiver

Personal information
- Born: November 30, 1985 (age 40); Miami, Florida, U.S.
- Listed height: 6 ft 3 in (1.91 m)
- Listed weight: 195 lb (88 kg)

Career information
- High school: South Dade (FL)
- College: Nicholls State
- NFL draft: 2010: undrafted

Career history
- Chicago Bears (2010)*; Green Bay Packers (2010–2011)*; Seattle Seahawks (2010)*; Omaha Nighthawks (2012); New Orleans VooDoo (2013–2014); Winnipeg Blue Bombers (2014); Orlando Predators (2015)*
- * Offseason or practice squad member only

Awards and highlights
- Super Bowl champion (XLV)

Career AFL statistics
- Receptions: 15
- Receiving yards: 180
- Receiving average: 12
- Receiving touchdowns: 3
- Stats at ArenaFan.com
- Stats at Pro Football Reference

Antonio Robinson (born November 11, 1985) is an American former professional football player. He played college football for Nicholls State Colonels and was signed by the Chicago Bears of the National Football League (NFL) as an undrafted free agent in 2010. He later won Super Bowl XLV as a member of the Green Bay Packers, defeating the Pittsburgh Steelers.

== Professional career ==
=== Green Bay Packers ===
For the 2010 and 2011 seasons, Robinson was a member of the Green Bay Packers in the NFL.

=== Seattle Seahawks ===
Robinson was signed to the Seattle Seahawks' practice squad on November 9, 2010, and was released on November 23.

=== Omaha Nighthawks ===
In 2012, Robinson played for the Omaha Nighthawks in the United Football League.

=== New Orleans VooDoo ===
Robinson was assigned to the New Orleans VooDoo of the Arena Football League on June 5, 2013.
