= 2013 Chicago Bears season =

American football league team season

- Owner: The McCaskey Family
- General manager: Phil Emery
- Head coach: Marc Trestman
- Home stadium: Soldier Field

Results
- Record: 8–8
- Division place: 2nd NFC North
- Playoffs: Did not qualify
- Pro Bowlers: 5: RB Matt Forte; WR Brandon Marshall; WR Alshon Jeffery; RG Kyle Long; CB Tim Jennings

Uniform
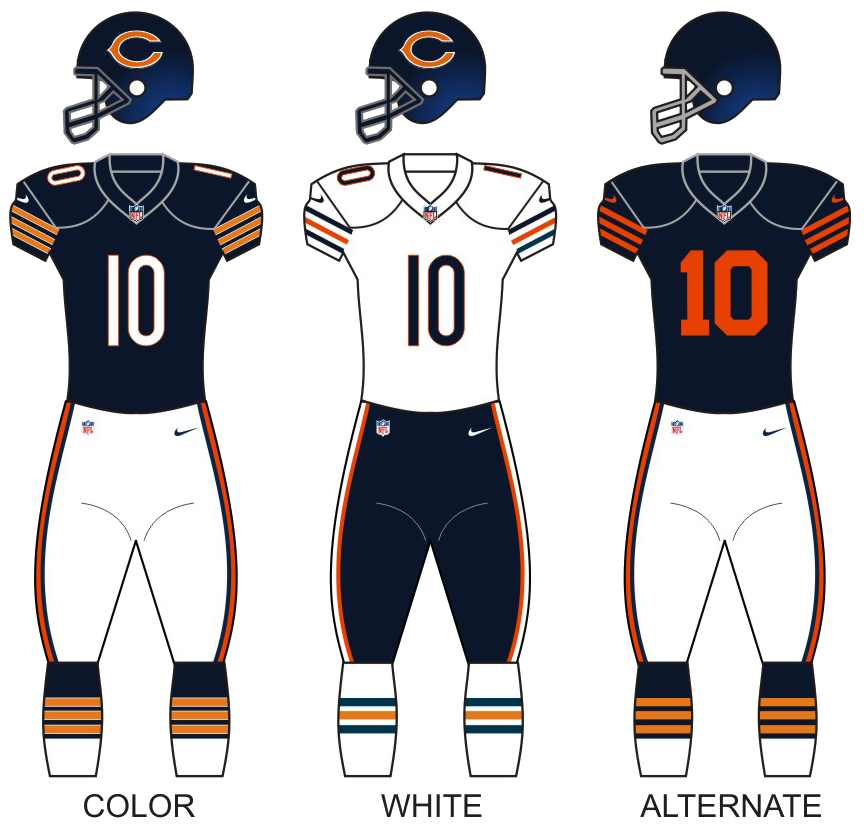

The 2013 season was the Chicago Bears' 94th in the National Football League (NFL) and their first under head coach Marc Trestman after Lovie Smith was fired on December 31, 2012. The Chicago Bears played at Soldier Field for the 11th season since its reconstruction in 2001. For the sixth time in seven years since the Super Bowl XLI loss in the 2006 NFL Season, they failed to qualify for the playoffs with an 8–8 record.

For the first time since 1999, linebacker Brian Urlacher was not on the opening day roster. The Bears won their first three games in the regular season against the Cincinnati Bengals, Minnesota Vikings, and Pittsburgh Steelers, before losing in weeks four and five to the Detroit Lions and New Orleans Saints. After defeating the New York Giants, the Bears faced a challenge when quarterback Jay Cutler suffered a groin injury in a loss to the Washington Redskins. The Bears entered the bye week at 4–3. With Cutler out, Josh McCown stepped in against the Green Bay Packers in week nine and led the Bears to victory. Cutler returned for the next game against the Detroit Lions, although he was unable to play due to an ankle injury leading McCown to fill in for the next four games. During the four-game span under McCown, the Bears went 2–2 while he excelled, throwing thirteen touchdowns and one interception. Jay Cutler returned to full health and the starting lineup in Week 15 against the Cleveland Browns despite McCown's play.

The Lions lost the day after the Bears defeated the Browns, allowing the Bears the opportunity to clinch the NFC North in Week 16, needing a victory over the Philadelphia Eagles and both the Packers and Lions to lose. Both division rivals lost, but the Bears also lost 54–11 against the Eagles. Chicago still had an opportunity to win the division in Week 17, but they were eliminated from playoff contention with a 33–28 loss to the Packers.

== Offseason ==
=== Organizational changes ===
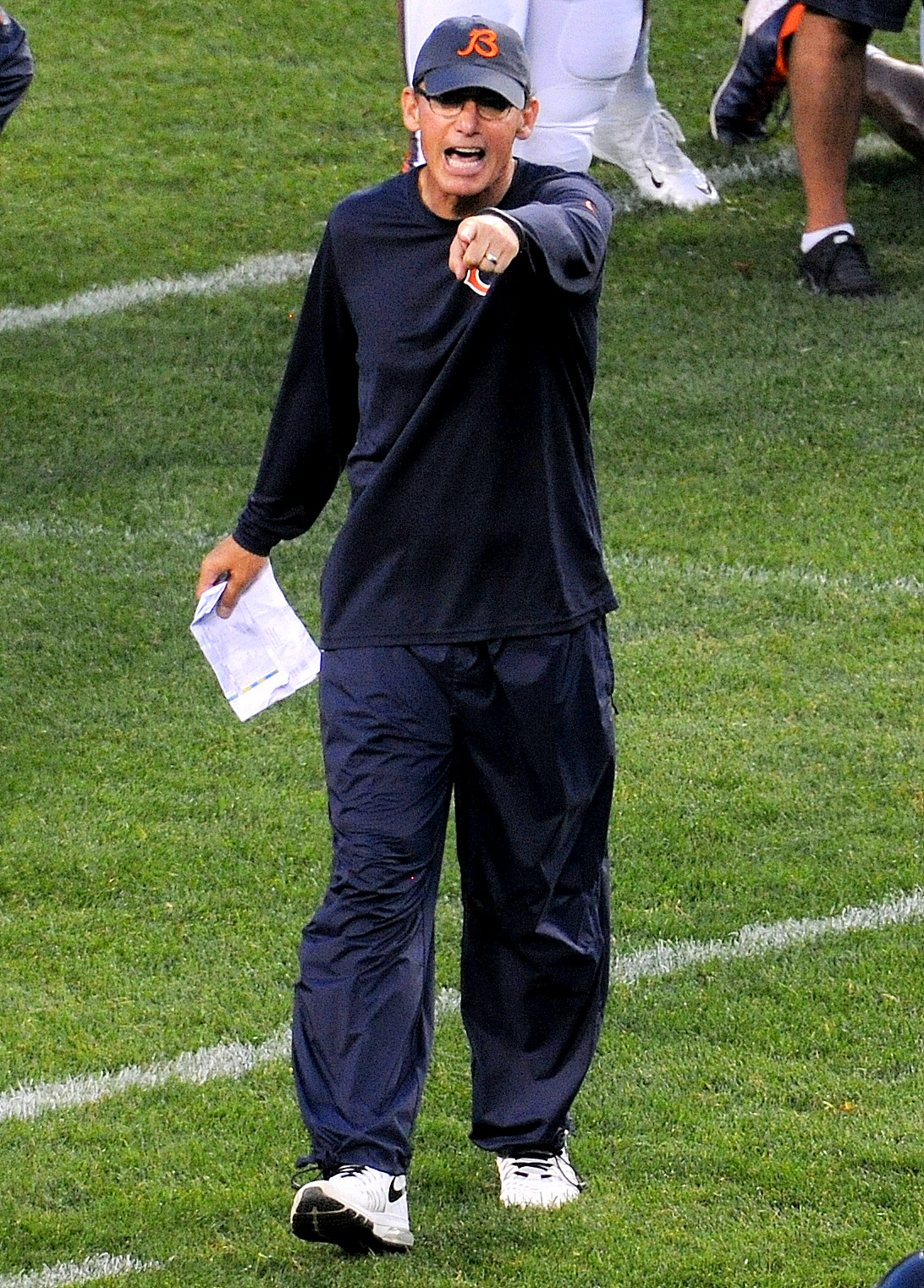
Marc Trestman was hired as the team's 13th head coach on January 15

On December 31, 2012, nine-year head coach Lovie Smith was fired. After Smith's firing, the Bears requested interviews with thirteen coaches, twelve from the NFL plus Montreal Alouettes, of the Canadian Football League, head coach Marc Trestman. The hunt later narrowed down to Trestman, Seattle Seahawks offensive coordinator Darrell Bevell, and Indianapolis Colts offensive coordinator Bruce Arians. Ultimately, Trestman was hired on January 15, 2013.

Trestman then hired New Orleans Saints offensive line coach Aaron Kromer as offensive coordinator. The Dallas Cowboys later reported that Joe DeCamillis, who had been among the Bears' 13 head coaching candidates, would join the Bears as the team's assistant head coach/special teams coordinator. Trestman also hired Andy Bischoff and Michael Sinclair as tight ends and defensive line coaches, respectively. Both coaches worked with Trestman in Montreal. Alouettes offensive coordinator Pat Meyer also joined the Bears as offensive line coach, along with Purdue defensive coordinator and colleague of Trestman, Tim Tibesar, as linebackers coach. Former Alouettes coaches Brendan Nugent and Carson Walch were hired as offensive quality control assistants.

On January 15, special teams coordinator Dave Toub announced that he was leaving the Bears for the Kansas City Chiefs. Two days later, it was announced defensive coordinator Rod Marinelli would not return to the team either. Eight assistants were also dismissed: quarterbacks coach Jeremy Bates, running backs coach Tim Spencer, wide receivers coach Darryl Drake, tight ends coach Mike DeBord, offensive line coach Tim Holt, linebackers coach Bob Babich, defensive backs coach Gill Byrd, and offensive coordinator Mike Tice. To replace Bates and Spencer, Chicago hired Matt Cavanaugh and Skip Peete as quarterbacks and running backs coach, respectively. To take Marinelli's place, the Bears hired Jacksonville Jaguars' defensive coordinator Mel Tucker. On February 21, Trestman's staff was completed after the Bears hired Alabama Crimson Tide coach Mike Groh as wide receivers coach.

On January 19, Bears director of physical development Rusty Jones announced his retirement after 28 years in the NFL. He was eventually replaced by Mike Clark. On January 28, Chicago hired former Bears safety Chris Harris as defensive quality control, with Sean Desai serving the same position, along with Dwayne Stukes as assistant special teams coordinator.

On May 3, Bears pro scouting director Chris Ballard, who had been hired by general manager Phil Emery, left the team for the Chiefs and was replaced by assistant director of college scouting Kevin Turks. Regional scout James Kirkland was also let go. On May 6, executive director and Southeastern Conference overseer, Ted Monago, joined the St. Louis Rams. On the same day, Kevin Turks and Dwayne Joseph were promoted to director of pro personnel and assistant director of pro personnel, respectively.

=== Roster changes ===
Position	Player	Free agency tag	Date signed	2013 team
QB	Josh McCown	UFA	March 29	Chicago Bears
RB	Kahlil Bell	UFA	August 11	New York Jets
OG	Lance Louis	UFA	March 27	Miami Dolphins
OG	Chris Spencer	UFA	April 1	Tennessee Titans
OG	Chilo Rachal	UFA	April 10	Arizona Cardinals
OT	Jonathan Scott	UFA	March 25	Chicago Bears
DE	Israel Idonije	UFA	June 25	Detroit Lions
DT	Amobi Okoye	UFA	–	–
LB	Geno Hayes	UFA	March 13	Jacksonville Jaguars
LB	Nick Roach	UFA	March 15	Oakland Raiders
CB	Zack Bowman	UFA	March 15	Chicago Bears
CB	Kelvin Hayden	UFA	March 26	Chicago Bears
CB	D. J. Moore	UFA	March 19	Carolina Panthers
S	Troy Nolan	UFA	July 29	Tampa Bay Buccaneers
K	Olindo Mare	UFA	–	–
RFA: Restricted free agent, UFA: Unrestricted free agent, ERFA: Exclusive rights free agent LEGEND – Light green background indicates a player re-signed by the Bears. – Light red background indicates a player who departed from the Bears.

The Bears entered free agency with 16 unrestricted free agents that season.

==== Acquisitions ====
The Bears acquired free agents Cheta Ozougwu, Brittan Golden, Matt Blanchard, Terrence Toliver, Patrick Trahan, Brody Eldridge, Fendi Onobun, Lawrence Wilson, Cyhl Quarles, Tom Nelson, and LeQuan Lewis in the pre-free agency signing period.

NFL free agency opened on March 12, with the Bears signing New York Giants tight end Martellus Bennett and New Orleans Saints offensive lineman Jermon Bushrod. From March 20 to 24, the Bears signed at least one player per day, starting with Turk McBride. Steve Maneri, D. J. Williams, Tom Zbikowski, James Anderson, Matt Slauson, Andre Fluellen, Kyle Moore, Taylor Boggs, Eben Britton, and Austin Signor followed. The only signing in May was undrafted rookie Maurice Jones on May 12. On June 10, the Bears signed Devin Aromashodu, Jerrell Jackson and Tony Fiammetta, followed by Sedrick Ellis the next day.

==== Departures ====
The first departure of the team was receiver Johnny Knox on February 12, who had suffered a serious injury in 2011 and missed the entire 2012 season. On March 13, tight ends Kellen Davis and Matt Spaeth were waived. There was only one departure in April, occurring on April 2, with the release of defensive lineman Matt Toeaina. On June 9, offensive lineman and the team's first-round draft pick in 2011, Gabe Carimi, were traded to the Tampa Bay Buccaneers for a sixth-round pick in the 2014 draft. The following day, Evan Rodriguez, Dale Moss and Demetrius Fields were waived.

Eleven of the Bears' UFAs did not return, nine of whom joined other teams, starting with linebacker Geno Hayes' signing with the Jacksonville Jaguars on March 13. The Bears lost another linebacker in Nick Roach on March 15, when he joined the Oakland Raiders, and another defensive player was lost when cornerback D. J. Moore was signed by the Carolina Panthers four days later. On March 20, eight-time Pro Bowler and 13-year linebacker Brian Urlacher was not retained for the 2013 season. Six days later, Jason Campbell was signed by the Cleveland Browns, and the next day, Lance Louis joined the Miami Dolphins.

=== 2013 draft class ===
The Bears entered the draft with needs at positions including offensive lineman, linebacker, defensive lineman, and cornerback. In the first round, with the twentieth pick, the Bears selected Oregon offensive tackle Kyle Long. In the second round, with the fiftieth pick, the Bears selected Jon Bostic, a linebacker from Florida. Two rounds later, the Bears used their 117th overall pick on Rutgers linebacker Khaseem Greene and in the fifth round, the Bears traded down ten spots with the Atlanta Falcons to draft Louisiana Tech offensive tackle Jordan Mills. In the sixth round, Chicago selected Georgia Bulldogs defensive end Cornelius Washington. Using a seventh-rounder acquired in the trade with Atlanta, the Bears drafted Washington State wide receiver Marquess Wilson.

The Bears draft class received average grades, with questions from some graders questioning the selections of Long and Bostic, including Jason Cole of Yahoo! Sports, who gave the class a grade of "C+". ESPN draft analyst Mel Kiper, Jr. stated he "wasn't in love with the value" of Long's talent, classifying the draft class as a "C+", while Sports Illustrated writer Chris Burke asked why Chicago selected Bostic over Kansas State linebacker Arthur Brown. However, Burke praised Washington's selection as a potential steal, giving a grade of "B−". Thad Novak of the International Business Times gave Long the lowest grade of the players drafted by Chicago with a "C−", considering him a "raw" player; Mills was awarded a "C+", due to not blocking against many top defenders in college. Washington and Wilson were given a "B−" and "B+", respectively. Novak noted the former, despite being a linebacker, could adjust into the Bears' 4-3 defense. Linebackers Bostic and Greene were given an "A" and "A+", the latter being considered a steal who could add depth to the linebacking corps. Vinny Iyer of Sporting News gave the class a "C", stating Long should start as a guard before switching to tackle, which would be filled by Mills; Iyer also considered Bostic a "textbook replacement" for Brian Urlacher, while stating that Greene could replace Nick Roach as a strong-side linebacker. After the 2013 season, Kiper improved the Bears' class to a "B".

All six drafted players agreed to four-year contracts. Mills and Washington were the first players to sign on May 1, followed by Greene and Wilson the following day. Bostic was the next player to sign, agreeing to a contract on May 9, and Long was the final player to sign, signing his contract on May 17.

2013 Chicago Bears draft
Round	Pick	Player	Position	College	Notes
1	20	Kyle Long *	Offensive tackle	Oregon	
2	50	Jon Bostic	Linebacker	Florida	
4	117	Khaseem Greene	Linebacker	Rutgers	
5	163	Jordan Mills	Offensive tackle	Louisiana Tech	
6	188	Cornelius Washington	Defensive end	Georgia	From Atlanta Falcons
7	236	Marquess Wilson	Wide receiver	Washington State	From Atlanta Falcons
Made roster † Pro Football Hall of Fame * Made at least one Pro Bowl during career

Notes

- The team traded its third-round selection along with a 2012 third-round selection to the Miami Dolphins in exchange for wide receiver Brandon Marshall.
- The team traded its seventh-round selection to the Tampa Bay Buccaneers in exchange for defensive tackle Brian Price.

Draft Day Trades
Round	Overall	Team	Received
5	40	to Atlanta Falcons	Atlanta's fifth round pick (163rd overall); Atlanta's seventh round pick (236th overall)

=== Undrafted free agents ===
After the draft's conclusion, the Bears announced they had contracted ten undrafted free agents: LSU running back Michael Ford and center P. J. Lonergan, Rutgers receiver Mark Harrison, Oklahoma cornerback Demontre Hurst and punter Tress Way, Iowa State receiver Josh Lenz, Montana State linebacker Zach Minter, Memphis receiver Marcus Rucker, Georgia Southern defensive tackle Brent Russell, and NC State cornerback C. J. Wilson.

== Preseason ==
=== Transactions ===
Preseason roster changes

Additions

- On August 10, the Bears signed Brandon Hartson.
- On August 11, the Bears signed Derrick Martin.
- On August 13, the Bears signed Curtis Brinkley.
- On August 16, the Bears signed Jordan Palmer.
- On August 17, the Bears signed Eric Foster.
- On August 18, the Bears signed Trent Edwards.
- On September 1, the Bears signed David Bass.
- On September 2, the Bears signed Dante Rosario.
- On September 3, the Bears signed Kyle Adams.

Departures

- On August 11, the Bears released Cyhl Quarles.
- On August 13, the Bears released Marcus Rucker.
- On August 17, the Bears released Jamaal Anderson and Andrew Starks.
- On August 18, the Bears released Jerrell Jackson.
- On August 25, the Bears released Devin Aromashodu, Leonard Pope, Tom Zbikowski, Patrick Trahan, Curtis Brinkley, Eric Foster, A. J. Lindeman, P. J. Lonergan, Derrick Martin, Kyle Moore, Gabe Miller, Brent Russell, Tress Way and Lawrence Wilson.
- On August 27, the Bears released Matt Blanchard via an injury settlement.
- On August 30, the Bears released J'Marcus Webb, Jordan Palmer, Trent Edwards, Brittan Golden, Josh Lenz, Edwin Williams, Derek Dennis, Jerry Franklin, Fendi Onobun, Harvey Unga, Aston Whiteside, Josh Williams, Christian Tupou, Tom Nelson, Demontre Hurst and Brandon Hartson.
- On August 31, the Bears released Brandon Hardin, J. T. Thomas, Terrence Toliver, Corvey Irvin and Cory Brandon.
- On September 1, the Bears released Cheta Ozougwu.
- On September 2, the Bears released Kyle Adams.
- On September 3, the Bears released Jonathan Scott.

Practice squad additions

- On September 1, the Bears added Demontre Hurst, Fendi Onobun, Jerry Franklin, Aston Whiteside, Harvey Unga, Jerrod Johnson and Ricardo Lockette to the practice squad.
- On September 2, the Bears added Jamaal Johnson-Webb to the practice squad.

=== Schedule ===
The Bears' pre-season opponents and schedule were announced on April 4. Chicago opened the preseason on the road against the Carolina Panthers, followed by an ESPN-televised game against the San Diego Chargers. The Bears then visited the Oakland Raiders, for whom head coach Marc Trestman, offensive coordinator/offensive line coach Aaron Kromer, and running backs coach Skip Peete worked during their run to Super Bowl XXXVII, before ending the preseason against frequent preseason opponent Cleveland Browns, the tenth consecutive meeting between the two teams.

Week	Date	Opponent	Result	Record	Game site	GameBook	NFL.com recap
1	August 9	at Carolina Panthers	L 17–24	0–1	Bank of America Stadium	GameBook	Recap
2	August 15	San Diego Chargers	W 33–28	1–1	Soldier Field	GameBook	Recap
3	August 23	at Oakland Raiders	W 34–26	2–1	O.co Coliseum	GameBook	Recap
4	August 29	Cleveland Browns	L 16–18	2–2	Soldier Field	GameBook	Recap

=== Game summaries ===
Against the Panthers, the Bears' defense forced three turnovers in the first half, which included a 51-yard interception return for touchdown by Jon Bostic, followed by Zack Bowman intercepting Derek Anderson and Sherrick McManis forcing Kenjon Barner to fumble; the Bears recorded a total of four takeaways in the game. However, the offense allowed seven sacks and had three turnovers, one of which was a fumble by Armando Allen. Panthers cornerback Josh Norman had two interceptions, one of which set up the first score of the game via Cam Newton's three-yard touchdown pass to Brandon LaFell early in the game. Bostic's pick-six tied up the game, followed by Robbie Gould's 35-yard field goal in the second quarter. With 18 seconds left in the first half, Carolina scored again on Kenjon Barner's 5-yard touchdown run; the Panthers scored the lone points of the third quarter after Norman intercepted Matt Blanchard, scoring on the 60-yard return. Though the Bears retaliated after Blanchard threw a 58-yard pass to Marquess Wilson to Carolina's 4-yard line, followed by Michael Ford's touchdown run, Graham Gano's 50-yard field goal was the final score of the game, as the Panthers triumphed 24–17.

Playing San Diego, Chicago opened with touchdowns by Brandon Marshall and Matt Forte and led 20–0 late in the second quarter. The defense forced four turnovers in the first half off Chris Conte's interception, Major Wright's fumble recovery, Blake Costanzo recovering a muffed punt, and Corvey Irvin's recovery of a blocked punt. The Chargers began to rally, scoring on Fozzy Whittaker's rushing touchdown in the second quarter, followed by two more touchdowns in the third quarter, which Chicago countered with Michael Ford's 100-yard kickoff return to San Diego's 4-yard line. Afterwards, Michael Bush ran for a 3-yard touchdown, and while San Diego managed to score two more touchdowns, but the Bears held on to win 33–28.

Against Oakland, the Bears scored 23 unanswered points in the first half, along with outgaining the Raiders 222 yards to 34 with a little over 10 minutes remaining in the first half. The Bears scored first off Forte's 32-yard touchdown, followed by Bush scoring two rushing touchdowns of ten and one yard each, and the first half ended with a 27–3 lead for Chicago. Meanwhile, the defense forced four turnovers off Tim Jennings and Isaiah Frey intercepting Matt Flynn and C. J. Wilson and Jerry Franklin intercepting Matt McGloin. As for Oakland, Terrelle Pryor replaced Flynn in the second half, and led the Raiders to two touchdowns and a field goal to narrow the gap to 27–20. The Bears retaliated with Michael Ford scoring a 15-yard touchdown, and the Raiders responded with McGloin's 5-yard touchdown pass to Jaime Olawale, but failed the two-point conversion, and the Bears sealed the game with Franklin's interception to win 34–26.

In Cleveland, the Bears started strong after Demontre Hurst intercepted Brian Hoyer's pass, which led to Robbie Gould's field goal, followed by Jordan Palmer's touchdown pass to Joseph Anderson, which Cleveland retaliated with James-Michael Johnson intercepting Trent Edwards and scoring. Late in the game, the Bears led 16–9, and Sherrick McManis intercepted Hoyer, who made up for the pick by throwing a touchdown pass to Dan Gronkowski. Later, Armonty Bryant forced Harvey Unga to fumble, which was recovered by Cleveland's L. J. Foyt, which led to Spencer Lanning kicking the go-ahead field goal to put the Browns up 18–16. With a little over a minute left in the game, Gould missed a 57-yard kick wide left, giving Cleveland the win.

== Regular season ==
=== Transactions ===
Regular season roster changes

Additions

- On September 9, the Bears signed Jonathan Scott.
- On September 27, the Bears signed Landon Cohen.
- On October 9, the Bears promoted Christian Tupou to the active roster.
- On October 18, the Bears promoted Jerry Franklin to the active roster.
- On October 28, the Bears signed Jordan Palmer and Larry Grant.
- On November 2, the Bears signed Jeremiah Ratliff.
- On November 6, the Bears signed Jeremy Cain.
- On November 13, the Bears signed Derrick Martin.
- On November 16, the Bears promoted Cheta Ozougwu to the active roster.
- On November 22, the Bears promoted Tracy Robertson to the active roster.
- On November 29, the Bears promoted Sean Cattouse to the active roster.
- On December 18, the Bears signed Joe Long.
- On December 26, the Bears signed Chris Williams.
- On December 30, the Bears signed Brandon Hartson, Demontre Hurst, C. J. Wilson, Fendi Onobun, Jerrod Johnson, Lawrence Wilson, Rogers Gaines, Sean Cattouse, Terrence Toliver, Tracy Robertson and Zach Miller.
- On December 31, the Bears signed Drew Butler and Willie Carter.

Departures

- On September 9, the Bears released Kyle Adams.
- On October 21, the Bears released Steve Maneri.
- On October 28, the Bears released C. J. Wilson.
- On November 5, the Bears released Zach Minter.
- On November 11, the Bears released Joseph Anderson.
- On November 16, the Bears released Larry Grant.
- On November 19, the Bears released Jeremy Cain.
- On November 29, the Bears released Tracy Robertson.
- On December 17, the Bears released Sean Cattouse.
- On December 26, the Bears released Christian Tupou.

Practice squad additions

- On September 9, the Bears added Jerrod Johnson to the practice squad.
- On September 24, the Bears added Cheta Ozougwu and Rogers Gaines to the practice squad.
- On October 1, the Bears added Sean Cattouse to the practice squad.
- On October 14, the Bears added Tracy Robertson to the practice squad.
- On October 28, the Bears added C. J. Wilson and Terrence Toliver to the practice squad.
- On November 19, the Bears added Lawrence Wilson to the practice squad.
- On December 3, the Bears added Tracy Robertson to the practice squad.
- On December 19, the Bears signed Sean Cattouse to the practice squad.

Practice squad departures

- On September 9, the Bears removed Derek Dennis from the practice squad.
- On September 24, the Bears removed Jerrod Johnson and Jamaal Johnson-Webb from the practice squad.
- On October 1, the Bears removed Harvey Unga from the practice squad.
- On October 21, the Bears removed Ricardo Lockette from the practice squad.

Reserve lists

- On September 27, the Bears placed Henry Melton on injured reserve.
- On October 9, the Bears placed Nate Collins on injured reserve.
- On October 18, the Bears placed D. J. Williams on injured reserve.
- On November 5, the Bears placed Joseph Anderson on injured reserve.
- On November 11, the Bears placed Charles Tillman on injured reserve.

=== Schedule ===
The Bears' schedule was released on April 18, 2013. Aside from the six games against their NFC North rivals, the Bears had the AFC North and NFC East on the schedule, along with two intraconference games against opponents with the same division placing as the Bears in the previous season. As a result, the Bears were assigned the St. Louis Rams and New Orleans Saints. NFL.com ranked the Bears' schedule as the sixteenth-strongest in the league, with all opponents having a combined 2012 record of 128–127–1, and a winning percentage total of .502.

Week	Date	Opponent	Result	Record	Game site	GameBook	NFL.com recap
1	September 8	Cincinnati Bengals	**W** 24–21	1–0	Soldier Field	Gamebook	Recap
2	September 15	**Minnesota Vikings**	**W** 31–30	2–0	Soldier Field	Gamebook	Recap
3	September 22	at Pittsburgh Steelers	**W** 40–23	3–0	Heinz Field	Gamebook	Recap
4	September 29	at **Detroit Lions**	**L** 32–40	3–1	Ford Field	Gamebook	Recap
5	October 6	New Orleans Saints	**L** 18–26	3–2	Soldier Field	Gamebook	Recap
6	October 10	New York Giants	**W** 27–21	4–2	Soldier Field	Gamebook	Recap
7	October 20	at Washington Redskins	**L** 41–45	4–3	FedExField	Gamebook	Recap
8	Bye						
9	November 4	at **Green Bay Packers**	**W** 27–20	5–3	Lambeau Field	Gamebook	Recap
10	November 10	**Detroit Lions**	**L** 19–21	5–4	Soldier Field	Gamebook	Recap
11	November 17	Baltimore Ravens	**W** 23–20 (OT)	6–4	Soldier Field	Gamebook	Recap
12	November 24	at St. Louis Rams	**L** 21–42	6–5	Edward Jones Dome	Gamebook	Recap
13	December 1	at **Minnesota Vikings**	**L** 20–23 (OT)	6–6	Mall of America Field	Gamebook	Recap
14	December 9	Dallas Cowboys	**W** 45–28	7–6	Soldier Field	Gamebook	Recap
15	December 15	at Cleveland Browns	**W** 38–31	8–6	FirstEnergy Stadium	Gamebook	Recap
16	December 22	at Philadelphia Eagles	**L** 11–54	8–7	Lincoln Financial Field	Gamebook	Recap
17	December 29	**Green Bay Packers**	**L** 28–33	8–8	Soldier Field	Gamebook	Recap
NOTE: Intra-division opponents are in **bold** text. LEGEND # Games played with color uniforms. # Games played with white uniforms. # Games played with 1940s throwback uniforms. – Light green background indicates a victory. – Light red background indicates a loss.

=== Game summaries ===
==== Week 1: vs. Cincinnati Bengals ====
Week One: Cincinnati Bengals at Chicago Bears – Game summary

Quarter	1	2	3	4	Total
Bengals	7	7	7	0	**21**
**Bears**	7	3	7	7	**24**

at Soldier Field, Chicago, Illinois

- Date: September 8
- Game time: 12:00 p.m. CDT
- Game weather: 73 °F (23 °C), cloudy
- Game attendance: 62,213
- Referee: Carl Cheffers
- TV announcers (CBS): Jim Nantz and Phil Simms
- Recap, Game book

Game information

**First quarter**

- CHI – Martellus Bennett 8-yard pass from Jay Cutler, Robbie Gould XP good, 9:52 (CHI 7–0)
- CIN – A. J. Green 2-yard pass from Andy Dalton, Mike Nugent XP good, 2:34 (TIE 7–7)

**Second quarter**

- CIN – A. J. Green 45-yard pass from Andy Dalton, Mike Nugent XP good, 2:53 (CIN 14–7)
- CHI – Robbie Gould 58-yard field goal, 0:11 (CIN 14–10)

**Third quarter**

- CIN – BenJarvus Green-Ellis 5-yard run, Mike Nugent XP good, 7:52 (CIN 21–10)
- CHI – Matt Forté 1 yard run, Robbie Gould XP good, 3:22 (CIN 21–17)

**Fourth quarter**

- CHI – Brandon Marshall 19-yard pass from Jay Cutler, Robbie Gould XP good, 7:58 (CHI 24–21)

**Top passers**

- CIN – Andy Dalton, 26/33, 282 yards, 2 TD, 2 INT
- CHI – Jay Cutler, 21/33, 242 yards, 2 TD, INT

**Top rushers**

- CIN – BenJarvus Green-Ellis, 14 carries, 25 yards, TD
- CHI – Matt Forté, 19 carries, 50 yards, TD

**Top receivers**

- CIN – A. J. Green, 9 receptions, 162 yards, 2 TD
- CHI – Brandon Marshall, 8 receptions, 104 yards, TD

**Top tacklers**

- CIN – Vontaze Burfict, 8 tackles
- CHI – Tim Jennings, 8 tackles

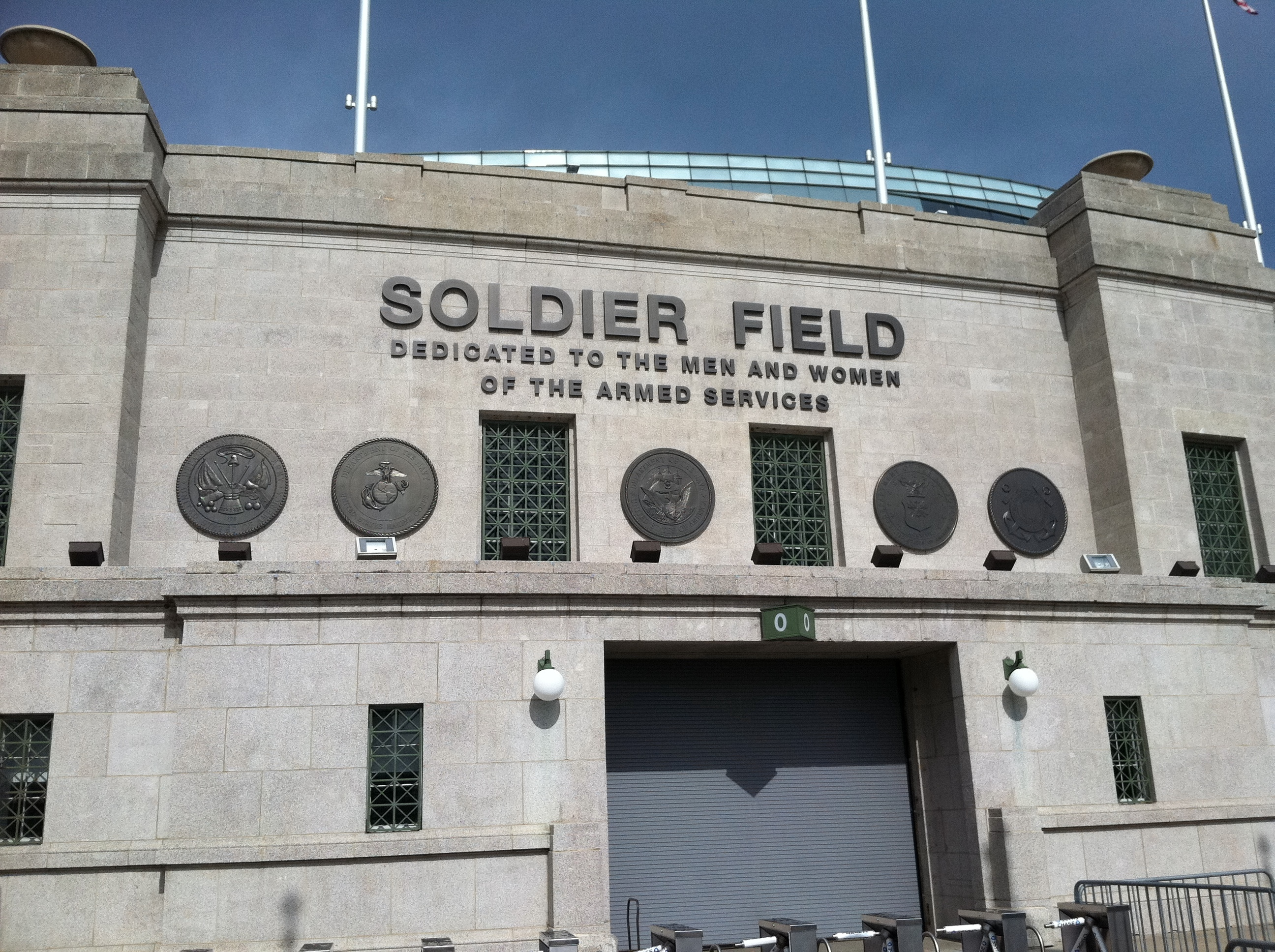
The Bears played all of their home games at Soldier Field

The Bears kicked off the regular season at home against the Cincinnati Bengals. The two teams entered with defenses that ranked in the top six in 2012. However, the Bears were ranked 16th in scoring at 23.4 points per game and 28th overall on offense, while the Bengals had an average score of 24.4 PPG and were 22nd in total offense. The Bears' offensive line allowed 44 sacks in 2012, and as a result, changed the line by adding veterans Jermon Bushrod and Matt Slauson to supplement Roberto Garza on the left, while rookies Kyle Long and Jordan Mills joined Garza on the right side, marking the first time the Bears offensive line featured two rookies since Jim Covert and Rob Fada in 1983. The Bears team captains for the season, starting with the Bengals game, were Cutler and Roberto Garza on offense, Lance Briggs and Julius Peppers on defense and Patrick Mannelly on special teams. 2013 was Mannelly's sixth consecutive season as captain, the fifth season for Cutler, third for Garza, fourth for Peppers and first for Briggs.

Chicago struck first with Charles Tillman intercepting Dalton, which was followed by Cutler's eight-yard touchdown pass to Martellus Bennett, which the Bengals responded to with a two-yard touchdown pass to Green. On the Bengals' first drive of the second quarter, Green was stripped by Tim Jennings, but the fumble went out of bounds. However, Dalton would be intercepted again by Tillman, his career-high second pick of the game, but the Bears failed to capitalize, and the Bengals scored again on Dalton's 45-yard touchdown pass to Greene. The Bears' Robbie Gould connected on a team record 58-yard field goal to close out the first half. In the second half, the Bengals scored again, after Tillman was penalized for pass interference, via BenJarvus Green-Ellis' 5-yard touchdown run, which the Bears retaliated with Matt Forté's one-yard touchdown run. In the fourth quarter, Cutler was intercepted by Vontaze Burfict, but the Bears got the ball back after Jennings forced Mohamed Sanu to fumble. On the next drive, the Bears converted a fourth down and Cutler threw the go ahead and eventual game-winning 19-yard touchdown pass to Brandon Marshall with 8:06 remaining. The Bengals failed to score on the next drive with 6:38 left, and the Bears clinched the game after Rey Maualuga was called for a personal foul after Michael Bush was stopped on third down. The Bears were able to run out the clock due to Cincinnati misusing its time-outs.

With the win, Trestman became the fourth head coach in franchise history to win his head coaching debut, after George Halas, Neill Armstrong and Dick Jauron. The Bears comeback in the second half marked the first time since 1980 the Bears came back from an 11-point deficit to win with two touchdown drives of 80 yards or more. The offense allowed zero sacks, the first time the Bears did not allow a sack in a season opener since 1998 against the Jacksonville Jaguars.

==== Week 2: vs. Minnesota Vikings ====
Week Two: Minnesota Vikings at Chicago Bears – Game summary

Quarter	1	2	3	4	Total
Vikings	7	14	3	6	**30**
**Bears**	14	10	0	7	**31**

at Soldier Field, Chicago, Illinois

- Date: September 15
- Game time: 12:00 pm. CDT
- Game weather: 60 °F (16 °C), rain
- Game attendance: 62,181
- Referee: Ed Hochuli
- TV announcers (Fox): Thom Brennaman, Brian Billick and Laura Okmin
- Recap, Game book

Game information

**First quarter**

- MIN – Cordarrelle Patterson 105-yard kickoff return, Blair Walsh XP good, 14:47 (MIN 7–0)
- CHI – Martellus Bennett 1 yard pass from Jay Cutler, Robbie Gould XP good, 12:12 (TIE 7–7)
- CHI – Brandon Marshall 34-yard pass from Jay Cutler, Robbie Gould XP good, 01:04 (CHI 14–7)

**Second quarter**

- MIN – Brian Robison 61-yard fumble return, Blair Walsh XP good, 07:34 (TIE 14–14)
- CHI – Tim Jennings 44-yard interception return, Robbie Gould XP good, 02:51 (CHI 21–14)
- MIN – Kyle Rudolph 20-yard pass from Christian Ponder, Blair Walsh XP good, 01:11 (TIE 21–21)
- CHI – Robbie Gould 20-yard field goal, 00:00 (CHI 24–21)

**Third quarter**

- MIN – Blair Walsh 28-yard field goal, 02:32 (TIE 24–24)

**Fourth quarter**

- MIN – Blair Walsh 28-yard field goal, 08:05 (MIN 27–24)
- MIN – Blair Walsh 22-yard field goal, 03:15 (MIN 30–24)
- CHI – Martellus Bennett 16-yard pass from Jay Cutler, Robbie Gould XP good, 00:10 (CHI 31–30)

**Top passers**

- MIN – Christian Ponder, 16/30, 227 yards, TD, INT
- CHI – Jay Cutler, 27/38, 292 yards, 3 TD, 2 INT

**Top rushers**

- MIN – Adrian Peterson, 26 carries, 100 yards
- CHI – Matt Forté, 20 carries, 88 yards

**Top receivers**

- MIN – Greg Jennings, 5 receptions, 84 yards
- CHI – Brandon Marshall, 7 receptions, 113 yards, TD

**Top tacklers**

- MIN – Chad Greenway, 11 tackles
- CHI – Major Wright, 11 tackles, pass deflection

In week two, the Bears played rival Minnesota, in the second home game of the season. The Bears fell behind early after Cordarrelle Patterson's 105-yard kickoff return for a touchdown. Devin Hester attempted to respond on the ensuing kickoff, but was pushed out of bounds at the Vikings' 32-yard line. The Bears fought back with a one-yard touchdown pass by Jay Cutler to Martellus Bennett. Chicago added to it with Cutler's touchdown pass to Brandon Marshall. In the second quarter, Jared Allen stripped the ball from Cutler, and Brian Robison returned the fumble 61 yards for a touchdown with 7:34 to go in the half. Afterwards, Hester returned the kickoff 80 yards to Minnesota's 23-yard line. The Bears offense later reached Minnesota's one-yard line, but Cutler had his pass intercepted by Kevin Williams in the end zone for a touchback. The Vikings failed to capitalize on the turnover after Tim Jennings intercepted Christian Ponder and scored on a 44-yard interception return. Minnesota retaliated with Ponder's 20-yard touchdown pass to Kyle Rudolph with 1:11 remaining, and the half ended with the Bears settling for a field goal. In the second half, the Vikings scored two field goals from Blair Walsh to take the 30–24 lead. However, the Bears scored on Cutler's 16-yard touchdown pass to Bennett, and ultimately prevailed after recovering an onside kick.

The win marked the second time in franchise history that the Bears won their first two games after trailing in the fourth quarter, the first being in 1971. During halftime, the team honored the 1963 Bears, two days following the death of running back Rick Casares, who was the team's leading rusher until Walter Payton surpassed him. When asked about Casares, defensive end Ed O'Bradovich stated, "Oh my God, I think when you talk to my fellow teammates over here, what was all right, true and good about professional football was embodied in Rick Casares. Nobody loved the game more than him."

==== Week 3: at Pittsburgh Steelers ====
Week Three: Chicago Bears at Pittsburgh Steelers – Game summary

Quarter	1	2	3	4	Total
**Bears**	17	7	3	13	**40**
Steelers	0	10	10	3	**23**

at Heinz Field, Pittsburgh, Pennsylvania

- Date: September 22
- Game time: 8:30 p.m. EDT/7:30 pm. CDT
- Game weather: 56 °F (13 °C), cloudy
- Game attendance: 61,575
- Referee: Pete Morelli
- TV announcers (NBC): Al Michaels, Cris Collinsworth and Michele Tafoya
- Recap, Game book

Game information

**First quarter**

- CHI – Robbie Gould 47-yard field goal, 08:02 (CHI 3–0)
- CHI – Matt Forté 5-yard run, Robbie Gould XP good, 05:05 (CHI 10–0)
- CHI – Michael Bush 1 yard run, Robbie Gould XP good, 02:01 (CHI 17–0)

**Second quarter**

- PIT – Shaun Suisham 27-yard field goal, 13:36 (CHI 17–3)
- CHI – Major Wright 38-yard interception return, Robbie Gould XP good, 08:57 (CHI 24–3)
- PIT – Antonio Brown 33-yard pass from Ben Roethlisberger, Shaun Suisham XP good, 06:27 (CHI 24–10)

**Third quarter**

- CHI – Robbie Gould 32-yard field goal, 10:54 (CHI 27–10)
- PIT – Shaun Suisham 36-yard field goal, 05:38 (CHI 27–13)
- PIT – Antonio Brown 21-yard pass from Ben Roethlisberger, Shaun Suisham XP good, 01:50 (CHI 27–20)

**Fourth quarter**

- PIT – Shaun Suisham 44-yard field goal, 10:38 (CHI 27–23)
- CHI – Earl Bennett 17-yard pass from Jay Cutler, Robbie Gould XP good, 05:48 (CHI 34–23)
- CHI – Julius Peppers 42-yard fumble return, Robbie Gould XP blocked, (CHI 40–23)

**Top passers**

- CHI – Jay Cutler, 20/30, 159 yards, TD
- PIT – Ben Roethlisberger, 26/41, 406 yards, 2 TD, 2 INT

**Top rushers**

- CHI – Matt Forté, 16 carries, 87 yards, TD
- PIT – Jonathan Dwyer, 12 carries, 39 yards

**Top receivers**

- CHI – Brandon Marshall, 5 receptions, 52 yards
- PIT – Antonio Brown, 9 receptions, 196 yards, 2 TD

**Top tacklers**

- CHI – Chris Conte, 8 tackles, 2 pass deflections
- PIT – Lawrence Timmons, 9 tackles, 2 pass deflections

The Bears travelled to Heinz Field to face the winless Pittsburgh Steelers in their first NBC Sunday Night Football matchup of the season. Pittsburgh had lost the previous week to Cincinnati to fall to 0–2 for the first time in 11 years. In the last game between the two in 2009, the Bears triumphed 17–14. Chicago started the game with Robbie Gould's field goal, followed by Matt Forté and Michael Bush's touchdown runs to take a 17–0 lead in the first quarter. Pittsburgh then scored on Shaun Suisham's 27-yard field goal, but the Bears then scored after Major Wright returned Roethlisberger's interception 38 yards for a touchdown for the 24–3 lead at halftime. In the second half, the Steelers began to rally with Roethlisberger throwing two touchdown passes of 33 and 21 yards to Antonio Brown, followed by Suisham kicking two more field goals to narrow the margin to 27–23. However, Jay Cutler threw a 17-yard touchdown pass to Earl Bennett; the pass was initially ruled incomplete but was reversed. Eventually, Lance Briggs stripped Roethlisberger, and Julius Peppers returned the fumble 42 yards for a touchdown. Although the eventual extra point by Gould was blocked by Troy Polamalu, the Bears finished the game with Chris Conte intercepting Roethlisberger with 1:39 left in the game for the fifth takeaway by Chicago on the night and the 40–23 win, dropping the Steelers to 0–3 for the first time since 1986.

==== Week 4: at Detroit Lions ====
Week Four: Chicago Bears at Detroit Lions – Game summary

Quarter	1	2	3	4	Total
Bears	3	10	3	16	**32**
**Lions**	3	27	7	3	**40**

at Ford Field, Detroit, Michigan

- Date: September 29
- Game time: 1:00 pm. EDT/12:00 pm. CDT
- Game weather: Played indoors (dome stadium)
- Game attendance: 64,552
- Referee: Mike Carey
- TV announcers (Fox): Thom Brennaman, Brian Billick and Laura Okmin
- Recap, Game book

Game information

**First quarter**

- CHI – Robbie Gould 34-yard field goal, 08:34 (CHI 3–0)
- DET – David Akers 23-yard field goal, 02:38 (TIE 3–3)

**Second quarter**

- DET – David Akers 31-yard field goal, 14:28 (DET 6–3)
- CHI – Matt Forté 53-yard run, Robbie Gould XP good, 13:44 (CHI 10–6)
- DET – David Akers 41-yard field goal, 10:19 (CHI 10–9)
- DET – Matthew Stafford 1 yard run, David Akers XP good, 06:09 (DET 16–10)
- DET – Calvin Johnson 2-yard pass from Matthew Stafford, David Akers XP good, 06:27 (DET 23–10)
- DET – Reggie Bush 37-yard run, David Akers XP good, 02:43 (DET 30–10)
- CHI – Robbie Gould 28-yard field goal, 00:00 (DET 30–13)

**Third quarter**

- CHI – Robbie Gould 25-yard field goal, 09:05 (DET 30–16)
- DET – Nick Fairley 4-yard fumble return, David Akers XP good, 00:20 (DET 37–16)

**Fourth quarter**

- DET – David Akers 43-yard field goal, 08:57 (DET 40–16)
- CHI – Alshon Jeffery 14-yard pass from Jay Cutler, Jay Cutler pass to Alshon Jeffery for two-point conversion, 04:00 (DET 40–24)
- CHI – Earl Bennett 10-yard pass from Jay Cutler, Jay Cutler pass to Brandon Marshall for two-point conversion, 00:43 (DET 40–32)

**Top passers**

- CHI – Jay Cutler, 27/47, 317 yards, 2 TD, 3 INT
- DET – Matthew Stafford, 23/35, 242 yards, TD, INT

**Top rushers**

- CHI – Matt Forté, 14 carries, 95 yards, TD
- DET – Reggie Bush, 18 carries, 139 yards, TD

**Top receivers**

- CHI – Alshon Jeffery, 5 receptions, 107 yards, TD
- DET – Kris Durham, 3 receptions, 58 yards

**Top tacklers**

- CHI – Lance Briggs, 13 tackles
- DET – Stephen Tulloch, 14 tackles, sack

The second divisional game of the year for the 3–0 Bears, looking for their first 4–0 start in seven seasons, took place at Ford Field against the 2–1 Detroit Lions. The Bears defense, ranked 19th in scoring defense with 24.7 points per game and 25th in yards allowed with 383.0, had to keep up with the Lions' 4th-ranked offense, who recorded 410.7 yards per game 27.3 PPG, sixth in the league. Neither team scored a touchdown in the first quarter, instead both scoring field goals, which extended into the first score of the second quarter. Later in the quarter, Matt Forté scored on a 53-yard run, allowing the Bears to take the 10–6 lead. However, after a David Akers field goal, the Lions would score three unanswered touchdowns, all within 3 minutes, 26 seconds: Micheal Spurlock's 57-yard punt return led to Matthew Stafford's 1-yard run, while Jay Cutler was intercepted by Glover Quin, which set up Stafford's 2-yard pass to Calvin Johnson; finally, the Lions scored after Reggie Bush found a hole and hurdled over Bears' safety Major Wright en route to a 37-yard touchdown. The 27 points scored in the quarter was the most by the Lions since September 30, 2007 against the Bears. The Bears ended the half with a field goal, but continued to trail 30–13. After the Bears kicked a field goal in the third quarter, Cutler was intercepted again, this time by Louis Delmas. However, Chicago regained possession after Stafford's pass to Johnson was kicked and caught by Wright. Three plays later, Cutler was sacked by Ndamukong Suh, and fumbled; the ball was picked up by Nick Fairley, who ran four yards for the touchdown. In the fourth quarter, Akers kicked another field goal to put the Lions up 40–16. Afterwards, the Bears began to mount a charge, with Cutler throwing a 14-yard touchdown pass to Alshon Jeffery with less than four minutes in the game, followed by a two-point conversion on another pass to Jeffery. With 43 seconds remaining, a ten-yard pass to Earl Bennett and a two-point conversion off a throw to Brandon Marshall drew the Bears within eight points, but the eventual onside kick was recovered by Lions receiver Kris Durham, allowing the Lions to clinch the 40–32 victory.

Statistically, the Bears offense struggled. Cutler completed 27 of 47 passes for 317 yards, two touchdowns, three interceptions and a 65.6 passer rating. Cutler's three interceptions and fumble tied his turnover amount in the first three games. The offense also had trouble on third down; despite being ranked ninth in third down efficiency, the Bears failed to convert until there were 47 seconds left in the game to end the game converting just 1 of 13 third downs.

==== Week 5: vs. New Orleans Saints ====
Week Five: New Orleans Saints at Chicago Bears – Game summary

Quarter	1	2	3	4	Total
**Saints**	6	14	3	3	**26**
Bears	0	7	3	8	**18**

at Soldier Field, Chicago, Illinois

- Date: October 6
- Game time: 12:00 pm. CDT
- Game weather: 60 °F (16 °C), sunny
- Game attendance: 62,361
- Referee: Scott Green
- TV announcers (Fox): Joe Buck, Troy Aikman and Pam Oliver
- Recap, Game book

Game information

**First quarter**

- NO – Garrett Hartley 47-yard field goal, 07:38 (NO 3–0)
- NO – Garrett Hartley 19-yard field goal, 06:00 (NO 6–0)

**Second quarter**

- NO – Pierre Thomas 2-yard pass from Drew Brees, Garrett Hartley XP good, 05:57 (NO 13–0)
- CHI – Alshon Jeffery 3-yard pass from Jay Cutler, Robbie Gould XP good, 02:41 (NO 13–7)
- NO – Pierre Thomas 25-yard pass from Drew Brees, Garrett Hartley XP good, 00:23 (NO 20–7)

**Third quarter**

- NO – Garrett Hartley 36-yard field goal, 08:03 (NO 23–7)
- CHI – Robbie Gould 27-yard field goal, 04:56 (NO 23–10)

**Fourth quarter**

- NO – Garrett Hartley 48-yard field goal, 03:01 (NO 26–10)
- CHI – Brandon Marshall 2-yard pass from Jay Cutler, Matt Forté run for two-point conversion, 02:11 (NO 26–18)

**Top passers**

- NO – Drew Brees, 29/35, 288 yards, 2 TD
- CHI – Jay Cutler, 24/33, 358 yards, 2 TD

**Top rushers**

- NO – Pierre Thomas, 19 carries, 36 yards
- CHI – Matt Forté, 12 carries, 55 yards

**Top receivers**

- NO – Jimmy Graham, 10 receptions, 135 yards
- CHI – Alshon Jeffery, 10 receptions, 218 yards, TD

**Top tacklers**

- NO – Curtis Lofton, 9 tackles
- CHI – Lance Briggs, 14 tackles, sack, 3 TFL

The Bears entered week six against the undefeated New Orleans Saints, the team Marc Trestman and offensive coordinator Aaron Kromer worked for. The previous meeting between the two teams occurred in 2012, with the Saints winning 30–13. As a result, offensively, the two teams were similar conceptually.

After the Bears punted, Garrett Hartley kicked a 47-yard field goal. On the ensuing possession, Malcolm Jenkins forced Jay Cutler to fumble, and Cameron Jordan recovered the loose ball and reached the Bears' 6-yard line. After failing to score a touchdown, Hartley kicked a 19-yard field goal. In the second quarter, the Saints scored off Drew Brees' two-yard screen pass to Pierre Thomas to increase the lead to 13 points. On Chicago's next drive, the offense traveled 70 yards within eight plays, which ended in Jay Cutler's three-yard touchdown pass to Alshon Jeffery. The final score of the half was by Thomas, who caught a 25-yard pass from Brees. In the third quarter, after Hartley kicked a 36-yard field goal, the Bears traveled 71 yards to the Saints' 5-yard line. However, a penalty on Kyle Long for being an ineligible downfield player, followed by three consecutive incomplete passes forced Robbie Gould to kick a 27-yard field goal. Early in the following quarter, Chicago reached New Orleans' 25-yard line, but turned the ball over on downs after Cutler's pass to Earl Bennett on 4th and 2 was dropped. On the Saints' next drive, a neutral zone infraction penalty by Lance Briggs on 4th and 1 allowed Hartley to kick a 48-yard field goal to extend the Saints' lead to 26–10. However, the Bears attempted to rally, with Cutler throwing three consecutive passes to Jeffery, the final throw going 58 yards to the Saints' 2-yard line, where Brandon Marshall scored. Matt Forté's two-point conversion allowed the Bears to narrow the gap to eight points, but the onside kick was recovered by the Saints. Although the Saints were forced to punt, with 21 seconds remaining, Cutler could only manage to throw a pass to Jeffery which reached the Bears' 41-yard line, as time ran out, giving the Saints the 26–18 win. The win marked the first time the Saints defeated the Bears in an away game since 2002, although that game occurred at Memorial Stadium in Champaign, Illinois.

Jeffery broke the franchise record for most receiving yards in franchise history with 218, which surpassed Harlon Hill's 214 yards against the San Francisco 49ers in 1954. Meanwhile, Marshall was targeted only five times during the game (15 percent of targets on the Bears), the lowest since Marshall's arrival in Chicago; the Bears fell to 0–4 in games when Marshall's target percentage was less than 20 percent.

==== Week 6: vs. New York Giants ====
Week Six: New York Giants at Chicago Bears – Game summary

Quarter	1	2	3	4	Total
Giants	7	7	7	0	**21**
**Bears**	7	17	3	0	**27**

at Soldier Field, Chicago, Illinois

- Date: October 10
- Game time: 7:25 pm. CDT
- Game weather: 63 °F (17 °C), clear
- Game attendance: 62,374
- Referee: John Parry
- TV announcers (NFLN): Brad Nessler, Mike Mayock and Alex Flanagan
- Recap, Game book

Game information

**First quarter**

- CHI – Tim Jennings 48-yard interception return, Robbie Gould XP good, 09:50 (CHI 7–0)
- NYG – Brandon Jacobs 4-yard run, Josh Brown XP good, 03:48 (TIE 7–7)

**Second quarter**

- CHI – Brandon Marshall 10-yard pass from Jay Cutler, Robbie Gould XP good, 14:18 (CHI 14–7)
- NYG – Rueben Randle 37-yard pass from Eli Manning, Josh Brown XP good, 10:31 (TIE 14–14)
- CHI – Brandon Marshall 3-yard pass from Jay Cutler, Robbie Gould XP good, 05:20 (CHI 21–14)
- CHI – Robbie Gould 40-yard field goal, 00:02 (CHI 24–14)

**Third quarter**

- CHI – Robbie Gould 52-yard field goal, 11:23 (CHI 27–14)
- NYG – Brandon Jacobs 1 yard run, Josh Brown XP good, 00:06 (CHI 27–21)

**Fourth quarter**

- No scoring

**Top passers**

- NYG – Eli Manning, 14/26, 239 yards, TD, 3 INT
- CHI – Jay Cutler, 24/36, 262 yards, 2 TD

**Top rushers**

- NYG – Brandon Jacobs, 22 carries, 106 yards, 2 TD
- CHI – Matt Forté, 19 carries, 67 yards

**Top receivers**

- NYG – Rueben Randle, 3 receptions, 75 yards, TD
- CHI – Brandon Marshall, 9 receptions, 87 yards, 2 TD

**Top tacklers**

- NYG – Jon Beason, 12 tackles
- CHI – Major Wright, 11 tackles

In week six, the Bears and the winless New York Giants met on Thursday night. On the third play from scrimmage, Zack Bowman intercepted Manning's pass intended for Rueben Randle at New York's 36-yard line and reached the 12-yard line, but Jay Cutler threw an incomplete pass to Brandon Marshall on fourth-and-two, giving the ball back to the Giants. On the eventual drive for the Giants, Tim Jennings intercepted Manning and scored the first touchdown of the night on a 48-yard interception return. The Giants eventually scored on Brandon Jacobs' 4-yard run after an 80-yard drive. On the Bears' next possession, Marshall scored on a 10-yard touchdown catch, which New York answered with Randle's 37-yard touchdown reception. Afterwards, Marshall caught a 3-yard pass to increase the score to 21–14, which was extended by Robbie Gould's 40-yard field goal with two seconds remaining in the half. On the first possession of the second half, Gould scored on a 52-yarder, his twelfth-consecutive 50+-yard field goal, tying Viking Blair Walsh's record. New York later engineered a 91-yard drive, which ended in Jacobs scoring on a 1-yard run. Jacobs ended the night with 106 rushing yards, his first 100-yard rushing game since week fourteen of 2011. After getting the ball back, the Giants reached the Bears' 35-yard line, but with 1:35 to go, Manning's pass to Brandon Myers was overthrown, and was tipped off his fingers towards Jennings for Manning's third interception of the night. The Bears ran out the clock to claim the victory, snap their two-game losing streak and gave the Giants their first 0–6 start since 1976.

The Bears recorded a season-high 26 first downs, and allowed neither a sack nor a turnover in a game for the first time since December 23, 2007 against Green Bay.

==== Week 7: at Washington Redskins ====
Week Seven: Chicago Bears at Washington Redskins – Game summary

Quarter	1	2	3	4	Total
Bears	10	7	7	17	**41**
**Redskins**	3	21	7	14	**45**

at FedExField, Landover, Maryland

- Date: October 20
- Game time: 1:00 pm. EDT/12:00 pm. CDT
- Game weather: 61 °F (16 °C), sunny
- Game attendance: 83,147
- Referee: Clete Blakeman
- TV announcers (Fox): Kenny Albert, Daryl Johnston and Tony Siragusa
- Recap, Game book

Game information

**First quarter**

- WAS – Kai Forbath 38-yard field goal, 11:28 (WAS 3–0)
- CHI – Robbie Gould 47-yard field goal, 07:03 (TIE 3–3)
- CHI – Matt Forté 2-yard run, Robbie Gould XP good, 06:02 (CHI 10–3)

**Second quarter**

- WAS – Roy Helu, Jr. 14-yard run, Kai Forbath XP good, 13:44 (TIE 10–10)
- WAS – Brian Orakpo 29-yard interception return, Kai Forbath XP good, 13:27 (WAS 17–10)
- CHI – Devin Hester 81-yard punt return, Robbie Gould XP good, 05:57 (TIE 17–17)
- WAS – Jordan Reed 3-yard pass from Robert Griffin III, Kai Forbath XP good, 00:27 (WAS 24–17)

**Third quarter**

- CHI – Matt Forté 50-yard run, Robbie Gould XP good, 06:34 (TIE 24–24)
- WAS – Roy Helu Jr. 3-yard run, Kai Forbath XP good, 03:19 (WAS 31–24)

**Fourth quarter**

- CHI – Matt Forté 6-yard run, Robbie Gould XP good, 12:44 (TIE 31–31)
- WAS – Aldrick Robinson 45-yard pass from Robert Griffin III, Kai Forbath XP good, 10:55 (WAS 38–31)
- CHI – Robbie Gould 49-yard field goal, 08:39 (WAS 38–34)
- CHI – Martellus Bennett 7-yard pass from Josh McCown, Robbie Gould XP good, 03:57 (CHI 41–38)
- WAS – Roy Helu Jr. 3-yard run, Kai Forbath XP good, 00:45 (WAS 45–41)

**Top passers**

- CHI – Josh McCown, 14/20, 204 yards, TD
- WAS – Robert Griffin III, 18/29, 298 yards, 2 TD, INT

**Top rushers**

- CHI – Matt Forté, 16 carries, 91 yards, 3 TD
- WAS – Alfred Morris, 19 carries, 95 yards

**Top receivers**

- CHI – Alshon Jeffery, 4 receptions, 105 yards
- WAS – Jordan Reed, 9 receptions, 134 yards, TD

**Top tacklers**

- CHI – Charles Tillman, 8 tackles, INT
- WAS – Perry Riley, 8 tackles

In week seven, the Bears traveled to Landover, Maryland's FedExField to play the 1–4 Washington Redskins. Since 2001, the Redskins had won five of the previous seven meetings, including the last four games. However, the Redskins were 0–2 at home in 2013, and were hoping to avoid going 0–3 at home since 1998. The Redskins struck first with Kai Forbath's 38-yard field goal, which was answered by Robbie Gould's 47-yarder. On Washington's ensuing drive, Griffin was intercepted by Charles Tillman, who returned the pick to the Redskins' 10-yard line, which set up Matt Forté's two-yard touchdown run. In the following quarter, Roy Helu scored on a 14-yard run to tie the game, and Washington pulled ahead after Brian Orakpo intercepted Cutler, scoring on the 29-yard return. Cutler later tore a groin muscle after getting sacked by Chris Baker, and Josh McCown took his role. Afterwards, Devin Hester returned a punt 81 yards for the touchdown, tying Deion Sanders' record for the most return touchdowns all-time with 19. However, the Redskins ended the first half as the leader after Griffin threw a three-yard touchdown pass to Jordan Reed. On the Bears' first drive of the second half, Gould missed a field goal wide right, but Chicago compensated for the miss with Forté's 50-yard touchdown run. Washington ended the third quarter with Helu's three-yard touchdown run to lead 31–24. On Chicago's next drive, the Bears were forced to kick a field goal after blitzes rendered the Bears unable to score a touchdown. Afterwards, the Bears successfully converted an onside kick, but were offsides, and were forced to kick off. Forté scored again on a six-yard run, which Griffin answered with a 45-yard touchdown pass to Aldrick Robinson. The Bears then pulled ahead with McCown's seven-yard touchdown pass to Martellus Bennett. With 3:57 left, the Redskins successfully reached the Bears' three-yard line, where Helu scored again with 45 seconds remaining. On the final play of the game, McCown was sacked by Barry Cofield and Ryan Kerrigan, ending the game with a 45–41 loss.

The game marked the first time in team history that the Bears have allowed 21 points or more in their first seven games, and the first time since 1969 that Chicago has allowed at least 40 points in two consecutive away games. Cutler was projected to be out for the next four weeks, with McCown serving as his replacement.

Statistics-wise, Cutler struggled, completing 3 of 8 passes for 28 yards with one interception and an 8.3 passer rating, while McCown completed 14 of 20 passes for 204 yards with one touchdown and a 119.6 passer rating. On the ground, Forté became the first Bears running back since Rashan Salaam to score three rushing touchdowns in a game. On defense, James Anderson was the only Bear to record a sack.

==== Week 8: Bye week ====
The Bears entered their bye week in third in the division behind Green Bay and Detroit. The team was attempting to recover from the injuries suffered by seven players in the previous week against the Redskins. Jay Cutler and Lance Briggs were projected to be out for four weeks, while Brandon Marshall, Alshon Jeffery, Charles Tillman, Major Wright and Blake Costanzo, the other five players hurt, used the bye to heal. Marc Trestman preferred to use the week to rest his players, stating, "I think we did a good thing by letting these guys rest. They came back with a lot of energy [at practice Monday]. There was very little rust in terms of executing and getting through the practice." During Trestman's tenure with the Montreal Alouettes, the Alouettes were 5–4 (.556) in games after bye weeks, and 3–1 (.750) in the postseason after byes. At practice on October 28, rookie Khaseem Greene filled in for Briggs, and was expected to start against the Packers. Greene and fellow rookie Jon Bostic eventually started for the Bears against the Packers. Lorin Cox of Pro Football Central predicted the Bears would finish the second half of the season with a 4–5 record, and a final record of 8–8.

==== Week 9: at Green Bay Packers ====
Week Nine: Chicago Bears at Green Bay Packers – Game summary

Quarter	1	2	3	4	Total
**Bears**	7	10	7	3	**27**
Packers	10	0	10	0	**20**

at Lambeau Field, Green Bay, Wisconsin

- Date: November 4
- Game time: 7:40 pm. CST
- Game weather: 49 °F (9 °C), cloudy
- Game attendance: 78,122
- Referee: Walt Anderson
- TV announcers (ESPN): Mike Tirico, Jon Gruden and Lisa Salters
- Recap, Game book

Game information

**First quarter**

- GB – Mason Crosby 30-yard field goal, 12:24 (GB 3–0)
- CHI – Brandon Marshall 23-yard pass from Josh McCown, Robbie Gould XP good, 09:48 (CHI 7–3)
- GB – James Starks 32-yard run, Mason Crosby XP good, 03:38 (GB 10–7)

**Second quarter**

- CHI – Matt Forté 1 yard run, Robbie Gould XP good, 09:26 (CHI 14–10)
- CHI – Robbie Gould 24-yard field goal, 00:00 (CHI 17–10)

**Third quarter**

- GB – Eddie Lacy 1 yard run, Mason Crosby XP good, 13:04 (TIE 17–17)
- GB – Mason Crosby 23-yard field goal, 08:45 (GB 20–17)
- CHI – Alshon Jeffery 6-yard pass from Josh McCown, Robbie Gould XP good, 02:41 (CHI 24–20)

**Fourth quarter**

- CHI – Robbie Gould 27-yard field goal, 00:50 (CHI 27–20)

**Top passers**

- CHI – Josh McCown, 22/41, 272 yards, 2 TD
- GB – Seneca Wallace, 11/19, 114 yards, INT

**Top rushers**

- CHI – Matt Forté, 24 carries, 125 yards, TD
- GB – Eddie Lacy, 22 carries, 150 yards, TD

**Top receivers**

- CHI – Brandon Marshall, 7 receptions, 107 yards, TD
- GB – Jordy Nelson, 4 receptions, 67 yards

**Top tacklers**

- CHI – Major Wright, 8 tackles
- GB – Morgan Burnett, 10 tackles

Coming off their bye week, the Bears traveled to Lambeau Field to play the Green Bay Packers in the 189th meeting (Note: 189 games including postseason games.) between the two rivals. The Bears had struggled regarding scoring against Green Bay in the last nine games between the two prior to 2013, and including the 2010 NFC title game, had scored 127 points, an average of 14.11 points. The two teams entered with among the top three scoring offenses, with Chicago and Green Bay ranked second and third, respectively, with 30.4 and 30.3 points per game, both of which rank behind the Denver Broncos.

On the Packers' first drive, Rodgers failed to recognize the Bears' zone defense, having expected a man-to-man defense, and Shea McClellin escaped Don Barclay's block and, along with Isaiah Frey, pulled Rodgers down, who landed on his shoulder and injured his left collarbone, and was replaced by Seneca Wallace for the remainder of the game. Afterwards, Mason Crosby kicked the 30-yard field goal to give the Packers the lead. On Chicago's first drive, McCown escaped pressure from Mike Neal and threw towards Brandon Marshall for the 7–3 lead. Once the Packers got the ball back, Wallace's pass for Jordy Nelson was tipped and intercepted by Julius Peppers, and was returned 14 yards to Green Bay's 45-yard line, but after the Bears failed to convert on third down, Adam Podlesh's punt was blocked by Jamari Lattimore. Eventually, James Starks ran 32 yards for the touchdown. However, the Bears traveled 60 yards on two plays, and Forté scored on the 1-yard run. The Bears ended the first half with Robbie Gould's 24-yard field goal to expand the lead to 17–10. In the third quarter, the Packers forced the Bears to punt, and Lacy ran 56 yards to the Bears' 1, and scored on the ensuing play. On the eventual kickoff, the Packers successfully attempted a surprise onside kick, which was recovered by Lattimore. Crosby kicked a 23-yarder on the drive. On the Bears' next drive, McCown threw a six-yard pass to Alshon Jeffery, whose size kept the ball from being knocked away by Davon House. After both teams exchanged punts in the fourth quarter, on the Bears' next drive, began attempting to run out the clock. On 4th and 1 at the Bears' 32 with 7:50 remaining, Forté ran three yards for the conversion and continuing the drive, which ended with Gould's 27-yard field goal. The drive lasted 18 plays and took up 8:58, leaving only 50 seconds remaining in the game. Despite a 15-yard pass by Wallace to Nelson, sacks by Corey Wootton and McClellin ended the game with a 27–20 victory for the Bears.

McCown ended the night completing 22 of 41 passes for 272 yards and two touchdowns, while Wallace completed 11 of 19 for 114 yards and an interception. The win marked the first time the Packers lost at home to an NFC North opponent since 2009, and the first win for the Bears at Lambeau Field since 2007.

==== Week 10: vs. Detroit Lions ====
Week Ten: Detroit Lions at Chicago Bears – Game summary

Quarter	1	2	3	4	Total
**Lions**	7	0	7	7	**21**
Bears	7	0	3	9	**19**

at Soldier Field, Chicago, Illinois

- Date: November 10
- Game time: 12:00 pm. CST
- Game weather: 47 °F (8 °C), mostly sunny
- Game attendance: 62,431
- Referee: Bill Leavy
- TV announcers (Fox): Kenny Albert, Daryl Johnston and Tony Siragusa
- Recap, Game book

Game information

**First quarter**

- CHI – Brandon Marshall 32-yard pass from Jay Cutler, Robbie Gould XP good, 12:37 (CHI 7–0)
- DET – Kris Durham 5-yard pass from Matthew Stafford, David Akers XP good, 05:57 (TIE 7–7)

**Second quarter**

- – No Scoring

**Third quarter**

- DET – Calvin Johnson 4-yard pass from Matthew Stafford, David Akers XP good, 12:58 (DET 14–7)
- CHI – Robbie Gould 25-yard field goal, 07:25 (DET 14–10)

**Fourth quarter**

- CHI – Robbie Gould 32-yard field goal, 09:17 (DET 14–13)
- DET – Calvin Johnson 14-yard pass from Matthew Stafford, David Akers XP good, 02:22 (DET 21–13)
- CHI – Brandon Marshall 11-yard pass from Josh McCown, Two-point conversion rush failed, 00:40 (DET 21–19)

**Top passers**

- DET – Matthew Stafford, 18/35, 219 yards, 3 TD, INT
- CHI – Jay Cutler, 21/40, 250 yards, TD, INT

**Top rushers**

- DET – Reggie Bush, 14 carries, 105 yards
- CHI – Matt Forté, 17 carries, 33 yards

**Top receivers**

- DET – Calvin Johnson, 6 receptions, 83 yards, 2 TD
- CHI – Brandon Marshall, 7 receptions, 139 yards, 2 TD

**Top tacklers**

- DET – Rashean Mathis, 8 tackles, TFL
- CHI – James Anderson, 6 tackles, TFL

Week ten featured the Bears attempting to avoid suffering the first sweep by the Lions since 2007, while also trying to claim the division lead; the last time the two teams faced each other in a late-season game for the division lead was in 1991, which ended in a Chicago 20–10 win. However, the Bears had won the last five games against the Lions at Soldier Field.

Chicago scored first after Cutler's 32-yard touchdown pass to Brandon Marshall capped a 65-yard drive that took just 2:23. However, the Lions would travel 85 yards to tie on Matthew Stafford's 5-yard pass to Kris Durham. In the following quarter, the Bears reached the Lions' 4-yard line, but Cutler's pass was tipped by Ndamukong Suh, and intercepted by DeAndre Levy in the endzone; both teams would fail to score in the quarter. During the quarter, Cutler began showing signs of struggling due to an ankle injury. In the third quarter, the Lions would score on Stafford's four-yard touchdown to Johnson. Afterwards, the Bears were forced to settle for a 25-yard field goal, narrowing the gap to one point. In the fourth, Stafford was intercepted by Chris Conte, who reached Detroit's 9-yard line, and Cutler would then throw a 14-yard touchdown pass to Alshon Jeffery, which was eventually nullified. After an incomplete pass, Gould kicked a 32-yard field goal to draw the score to 14–13. However, Johnson would catch a 14-yard pass from Stafford to increase the lead to 21–13, and with 2:22 remaining, Josh McCown entered the game in favor of Cutler, and guided the Bears' offense 74 yards, culminating in McCown's 11-yard touchdown pass to Marshall with 40 seconds to go. On the two-point conversion, McCown's pass to tight end Dante Rosario fell incomplete, but Willie Young was penalized for roughing the passer, allowing the Bears a second chance, which failed after Matt Forté was tackled by Nick Fairley in the backfield. The Bears' onside kick would backfire, as Joique Bell recovered, sealing a season sweep for the Lions.

Despite stating he was "100 percent" healthy after the groin injury suffered two games prior, it appeared the injury was still lingering; after throwing a pass during the third quarter, Cutler fell down and grabbed his groin, before standing back up. Regarding the injuries, Cutler stated, "It held up OK. It's all on the same leg so I think that was a problem. But the groin, you take the ankle out of the equation and I would have been fine, I think." Cutler ended the game having completed 21 of 40 passes for 250 yards with a touchdown, interception and a 69.8 passer rating. Despite x-rays on his ankle being negative, Cutler was ruled out of the next week's game against the Baltimore Ravens with a high ankle sprain. During the second quarter, Charles Tillman was also injured, suffering a torn right triceps brachii muscle, and was placed on injured reserve with the designation to return, allowing him to practice after six weeks and play in games two weeks after; as a result, Tillman missed the entire regular season.

==== Week 11: vs. Baltimore Ravens ====
Week Eleven: Baltimore Ravens at Chicago Bears – Game summary

Quarter	1	2	3	4	OT	Total
Ravens	10	7	0	3	0	**20**
**Bears**	0	13	0	7	3	**23**

at Soldier Field, Chicago, Illinois

- Date: November 17
- Game time: 12:00 pm. CST
- Game weather: 68 °F (20 °C), cloudy with thunderstorms, wind gusts to 34 mph
- Game attendance: 62,367
- Referee: Gene Steratore
- TV announcers (CBS): Jim Nantz and Phil Simms
- Recap, Game book

Game information

**First quarter**

- BAL – Ray Rice 1 yard run, Justin Tucker XP good, 09:58 (BAL 7–0)
- BAL – Justin Tucker 52-yard field goal, 04:51 (BAL 10–0)

**Second quarter**

- CHI – Robbie Gould 20-yard field goal, 08:50 (BAL 10–3)
- CHI – David Bass 24 interception return, Robbie Gould XP good, 08:38 (TIE 10–10)
- BAL – Torrey Smith 5-yard pass from Joe Flacco, Justin Tucker XP good, 04:08 (BAL 17–10)
- CHI – Robbie Gould 46-yard field goal, 00:00 (BAL 17–13)

**Third quarter**

- – No Scoring

**Fourth quarter**

- CHI – Matt Forté 14-yard pass from Josh McCown, Robbie Gould XP good, 10:33 (CHI 20–17)
- BAL – Justin Tucker 21-yard field goal, 00:03 (TIE 20–20)

**Overtime**

- CHI – Robbie Gould 38-yard field goal, 08:41 (CHI 23–20)

**Top passers**

- BAL – Joe Flacco, 17/31, 162 yards, TD, 2 INT
- CHI – Josh McCown, 19/31, 216 yards, TD

**Top rushers**

- BAL – Ray Rice, 25 carries, 131 yards, TD
- CHI – Matt Forté, 18 carries, 83 yards

**Top receivers**

- BAL – Torrey Smith, 5 receptions, 32 yards, TD
- CHI – Alshon Jeffery, 7 receptions, 83 yards

**Top tacklers**

- BAL – Corey Graham, 9 tackles, sack
- CHI – Julius Peppers, 11 tackles, 2 sacks, 4 TFL

Against the Baltimore Ravens in week eleven, the Bears wore their 1940s alternate uniforms. The Bears last played the Ravens in 2009, which ended with a Baltimore 31–7 victory.

The Ravens opened the game with Ray Rice gaining a 47-yard run, his longest of the year up to that point (his previous highest in 2013 was 14 yards), which led to Rice's 1-yard run with 9:58 in the first. The Ravens added to the score with Justin Tucker's 52-yarder, bringing the score to 10–0. With 4:51 left in the first quarter, the game was suspended due to inclement weather, which included a tornado watch, which was eventually elevated to a tornado warning. Fans were ordered to evacuate the stands and enter the covered concourses, while the teams returned to the locker rooms. The evacuation marked the first time Soldier Field had an evacuation since the stadium's opening in 1921. The game resumed play at 3:25 pm. ET, after a 1-hour, 53-minute-delay. In the second quarter, Robbie Gould kicked a 20-yard field goal, and eventually, rookie defensive end David Bass escaped a chop block by Rice and intercepted Flacco, scoring on a 24-yard return and tying the game. The Ravens eventually scored on Torrey Smith's five-yard touchdown catch, and after Flacco had a pass intercepted by Jon Bostic, Gould ended the half kicking a 46-yarder. After a scoreless third period, Matt Forté caught a 14-yard pass from McCown and scored with 10:33 in the fourth, the Bears finally taking the lead 20–17. Now behind by three, the Ravens engineered an 82-yard drive to Chicago's 2-yard line, but Rice failed to score twice, and a botched snap from Gino Gradkowski slowed down the Ravens, and Flacco's pass towards Smith was overthrown. As a result, the Ravens resorted to a 21-yard field goal with three seconds in regulation to force overtime. In overtime, Flacco's pass for Tandon Doss fell incomplete, and the Ravens punted to the Bears. McCown then completed a 43-yard pass to Martellus Bennett, and Gould kicked the game-winning 38-yard field goal with 8:41 remaining to win the game 23–20, which lasted five hours, 16 minutes.

==== Week 12: at St. Louis Rams ====
Week Twelve: Chicago Bears at St. Louis Rams – Game summary

Quarter	1	2	3	4	Total
Bears	7	7	0	7	**21**
**Rams**	21	3	3	15	**42**

at Edward Jones Dome, St. Louis, Missouri

- Date: November 24
- Game time: 12:00 pm. CST
- Game weather: Played indoors (dome stadium)
- Game attendance: 66,024
- Referee: Jerome Boger
- TV announcers (Fox): Kenny Albert, Daryl Johnston and Tony Siragusa
- Recap, Game book

Game information

**First quarter**

- STL – Tavon Austin 65-yard run, Greg Zuerlein XP good, 13:30 (STL 7–0)
- STL – Zac Stacy 1 yard run, Greg Zuerlein XP good, 12:36 (STL 14–0)
- CHI – Alshon Jeffery 7-yard pass from Josh McCown, Robbie Gould XP good, 6:14 (STL 14–7)
- STL – Jared Cook 6-yard pass from Kellen Clemens, Greg Zuerlein XP good, 1:27 (STL 21–7)

**Second quarter**

- CHI – Brandon Marshall 3-yard pass from Josh McCown, Robbie Gould XP good, 5:19 (STL 21–14)
- STL – Greg Zuerelein 29-yard field goal, 1:11 (STL 24–14)

**Third quarter**

- STL – Greg Zuerlein 40-yard field goal, 3:59 (STL 27–14)

**Fourth quarter**

- CHI – Michael Bush 1 yard run, Robbie Gould XP good, 7:15 (STL 27–21)
- STL – Benny Cunningham 9-yard run, Kellen Clemens pass to Isaiah Pead for two-point conversion, 3:05 (STL 35–21)
- STL – Robert Quinn 31-yard fumble return, Greg Zuerlein XP good (STL 42–21)

**Top passers**

- CHI – Josh McCown, 36/47, 352 yards, 2 TD, 1 INT
- STL – Kellen Clemens, 10/22, 167 yards, 1 TD

**Top rushers**

- CHI – Matt Forté, 16 carries, 77 yards
- STL – Benny Cunningham, 13 carries, 109 yards, 1 TD

**Top receivers**

- CHI – Brandon Marshall, 10 receptions, 117 yards, 1 TD
- STL – Jared Cook, 4 receptions, 80 yards, 1 TD

**Top tacklers**

- CHI – Khaseem Greene, 6 tackles
- STL – Alec Ogletree, 10 tackles

The Bears visited Edward Jones Dome in St. Louis to play the Rams, again without Jay Cutler. However, the Rams were also without starting quarterback Sam Bradford, and instead had Kellen Clemens as backup. The Bears had won four consecutive games against the Rams. St. Louis scored first on Austin's 65-yard run, and would reclaim the ball after James Carvalho stripped Matt Forté, leading to Stacy's one-yard touchdown run. The Bears would then score on McCown's seven-yard touchdown pass to Bennett, but the Rams ended the quarter with a 21–7 lead after Clemens' six-yard touchdown pass to Jared Cook. In the second quarter, McCown threw an incomplete pass, which appeared to be a fumble, and after Rams cornerback Trumaine Johnson picked up the ball, Bears fullback Tony Fiammetta pulled him to the ground by the facemask. Kyle Long would then be involved in an incident with Rams defensive lineman William Hayes, which led to Long kicking Hayes, causing Long's brother Chris Long to restrain Kyle, who would then be penalized for a personal foul. McCown and Fiammetta would also be penalized, for intentional grounding and facemasking, respectively. Halfway through the quarter, Chicago scored after McCown threw a three-yard pass to Marshall, but Greg Zuerlein would score on a 29-yard field goal to give the Rams a 24–14 lead at halftime. The lone score of the third quarter was Zuerlein's 40-yard kick.

Early in the fourth quarter, Hester recorded a 62-yard punt return for a touchdown, which was overruled by Craig Steltz's holding penalty. The Bears reached the Rams' one-yard line, but required eight plays: Michael Bush's run went for no gain; McCown's pass to Jeffery was incomplete, but a holding penalty on Brandon McGee gave the Bears a first down; Bush lost two yards on the following run; McCown's touchdown pass to Bennett was nullified by Jermon Bushrod's holding penalty; McCown's 13-yard touchdown pass to Forté was also nullified, after Forté failed to break the plane, instead placing the Bears back on the one-yard line; McCown was then sacked by Michael Brockers, but Brockers was penalized for roughing the passer; Bush failed to gain a yard on the next play; the Bears finally scored on the drive on Bush's one-yard run. On the Rams' ensuing drive, Benny Cunningham gained 27 yards, while the offense gained 48 yards from Clemens' 19 and 29 yards passes to Chris Givens and Cook, respectively. Four plays later, Cunningham scored on a nine-yard run, while Isaiah Pead scored on the two-point conversion. Devin Hester would fumble on the following kickoff but recovered at the Bears' ten-yard line. After the Bears' offense reached their own 39-yard line, Quinn stripped McCown and scored on the following fumble return. The game marked the third time the Bears allowed 40 points during the season for the first time since 1964.

McCown set the team record for most completions with 36, two greater than Jim Miller's and Brian Griese's 34 set on November 14, 1999 and September 30, 2007, respectively. Forté recorded 77 yards in the game, adding to 6,178 career rushing yards, surpassing Neal Anderson to become the second-highest rushing leader in team history. The Bears' defense recorded the second-worst defensive output in 2013, with a negative-11.4, making the team's defense the second-worst in the NFL.

==== Week 13: at Minnesota Vikings ====
Week Thirteen: Chicago Bears at Minnesota Vikings – Game summary

Quarter	1	2	3	4	OT	Total
Bears	3	3	14	0	0	**20**
**Vikings**	0	7	3	10	3	**23**

at Mall of America Field at the Hubert H. Humphrey Metrodome, Minneapolis, Minnesota

- Date: December 1
- Game time: 12:00 pm. CST
- Game weather: Played indoors (dome stadium)
- Game attendance: 64,134
- Referee: Carl Cheffers
- TV announcers (Fox): Thom Brennaman, Brian Billick and Laura Okmin
- Recap, Game book

Game information

**First quarter**

- CHI – Robbie Gould 30-yard field goal, 1:06 (CHI 3–0)

**Second quarter**

- MIN – Cordarrelle Patterson 33-yard run, Blair Walsh XP good, 7:27 (MIN 7–3)
- CHI – Robbie Gould 40-yard field goal, 2:47 (MIN 7–6)

**Third quarter**

- CHI – Alshon Jeffery 80-yard pass from Josh McCown, Robbie Gould XP good, 14:08 (CHI 13–7)
- MIN – Blair Walsh 32-yard field goal, 7:08 (CHI 13–10)
- CHI – Alshon Jeffery 46-yard pass from Josh McCown, Robbie Gould XP good, 5:15 (CHI 20–10)

**Fourth quarter**

- MIN – Greg Jennings 8-yard pass from Matt Cassel, Blair Walsh XP good, 7:41 (CHI 20–17)
- MIN – Blair Walsh 30-yard field goal, 0:20 (TIE 20–20)

**Overtime**

- MIN – Blair Walsh 34-yard field goal, 1:43 (MIN 23–20)

**Top passers**

- CHI – Josh McCown, 23/36, 355 yards, 2 TD
- MIN – Matt Cassel, 20/33, 240 yards, TD, INT

**Top rushers**

- CHI – Matt Forté, 23 carries, 120 yards
- MIN – Adrian Peterson, 35 carries, 211 yards

**Top receivers**

- CHI – Alshon Jeffery, 12 receptions, 249 yards, 2 TD
- MIN – Greg Jennings, 7 receptions, 67 yards, TD

**Top tacklers**

- CHI – Craig Steltz, 9 tackles
- MIN – Chad Greenway, 6 tackles

In week thirteen, the Bears visited the Hubert H. Humphrey Metrodome to play the Vikings, whom the Bears trailed 50–53–2 in the all-time series. Josh McCown was given the start for the third straight week, with an expectation that Jay Cutler would return the following week. McCown entered the game having a 65.5 completion percentage for 1,106 yards, seven touchdowns, an interception, and a 100.8 passer rating. As a result, McCown had an advantage over the Vikings' pass defense, which ranked 29th in the league with 282 passing yards allowed, while also allowing quarterbacks to record a 65 completion percentage, 40 attempts per game, and a 97.7 passer rating. Also, the Vikings allowed 31.5 points per game, the worst in the NFL, while recording only 14 turnovers. However, the Bears' defense was a weakness, ranking last in rushing yards allowed per game (145.2), total yards (1,597), and first-downs allowed (89); the defense was 31st in the NFL in yards per carry (4.9), first-down percentage (27.1) and 20-plus yard runs (12). Additionally, the defense allowed running backs in the previous five games to rush for 999 yards, average 5.8 yards per carry, and 197 yards per game. Adrian Peterson ran for an average of 108 yards per game in his career against the Bears, including 120.6 in the last three meetings between the two. Minnesota's rushing game also ran for a year-best 232 yards in the previous week. Cutler, Lance Briggs, Major Wright, Anthony Walters, James Brown, Jonathan Scott, and Cornelius Washington were inactive for the Bears.

In the first quarter, McCown had a pass intercepted by Chad Greenway, but an offsides penalty on Robert Blanton nullified the play; the drive would end with the only score of the first quarter via Robbie Gould's 30-yard field goal. In the second quarter, Cordarrelle Patterson's 33-yard touchdown run gave the Vikings the lead; Gould would subsequently kick a 40-yard field goal. Before the half ended, Christian Ponder suffered from symptoms of a concussion and left. On the Bears' first drive of the second half, McCown threw an 80-yard touchdown pass to Alshon Jeffery. After the Vikings responded with Blair Walsh's 32-yard field goal, Jeffery caught a 46-yard touchdown pass over Viking cornerback Chris Cook to give Chicago the lead 20–10; Cook would eventually be ejected from the game for shoving side judge Laird Hayes. On Minnesota's first possession of the final quarter, Matt Cassel threw an eight-yard touchdown to Greg Jennings, and on Chicago's next drive, McCown's flip pass for Kyle Long was deflected and stripped by Audie Cole, with Marvin Mitchell recovering. Despite starting the drive in the Bears' red zone and reaching the six-yard line, Cassel's pass for Rhett Ellison was tipped and intercepted by Khaseem Greene. After the Bears punted, Cassel fumbled on the first play, but recovered. Afterwards, the Vikings drove from their own six-yard line to the Bears' 12, where Walsh tied the game with a 30-yard field goal, making the score 20–20. On the final play of regulation, Gould's attempted 66-yard field goal fell short. In overtime, the Bears' opening drive ended after McCown was sacked by Jared Allen and fumbled, with Jermon Bushrod recovering, prompting the Bears to punt. On the Vikings' first drive of the period, Walsh's 39-yard field goal was overruled by Ellison's facemasking penalty; Walsh would miss the eventual 57-yarder. The Bears would reach the Vikings' 29-yard line, and on second down, Gould missed the 47-yard kick wide right. The Vikings would reach Chicago's 16-yard line, allowing Walsh to kick the game-winning 34-yard field goal.

Marc Trestman received criticism for calling Gould to attempt the 47-yard field goal on second down, with the Chicago Sun-Times calling the choice "an indefensible case of playing scared." Trestman responded by stating he did not want to lose a fumble or suffer a penalty. Jeffery set the team record for the most receiving yards in one game with 249, surpassing his previous record set against the Saints in week 5.

==== Week 14: vs. Dallas Cowboys ====
Week Fourteen: Dallas Cowboys at Chicago Bears – Game summary

Quarter	1	2	3	4	Total
Cowboys	7	7	0	14	**28**
**Bears**	7	17	11	10	**45**

at Soldier Field, Chicago, Illinois

- Date: December 9
- Game time: 7:40 pm. CST
- Game weather: 8 °F (−13 °C), partly cloudy
- Game attendance: 62,291
- Referee: Terry McAulay
- TV announcers (ESPN): Mike Tirico, Jon Gruden and Lisa Salters
- Recap, Game book

Game information

**First quarter**

- DAL – Dez Bryant 2-yard pass from Tony Romo, Dan Bailey XP good, 9:02 (DAL 7–0)
- CHI – Earl Bennett 8-yard pass from Josh McCown, Robbie Gould XP good, 1:39 (TIE 7–7)

**Second quarter**

- CHI – Josh McCown 7-yard run, Robbie Gould XP good, 8:58 (CHI 14–7)
- DAL – Jason Witten 10-yard pass from Tony Romo, Dan Bailey XP good, 3:36 (TIE 14–14)
- CHI – Robbie Gould 27-yard FG, 1:33 (CHI 17–14)
- CHI – Alshon Jeffery 25 pass from Josh McCown, Robbie Gould XP good, 0:17 (CHI 24–14)

**Third quarter**

- CHI – Robbie Gould 34-yard FG, 2:58 (CHI 27–14)
- CHI – Matt Forté 4-yard pass from Josh McCown, Brandon Marshall 2 pt conversion, 2:20 (CHI 35–14)

**Fourth quarter**

- CHI – Michael Bush 17-yard pass from Josh McCown, Robbie Gould XP good, 14:24 (CHI 42–14)
- DAL – Cole Beasley 9-yard pass from Tony Romo, Dan Bailey XP good, 10:52 (CHI 42–21)
- CHI – Robbie Gould 23-yard FG, 7:05 (CHI 45–21)
- DAL – Joseph Randle 1 yard run, Dan Bailey XP good, 0:06 (CHI 42–28)

**Top passers**

- DAL – Tony Romo, 11/20, 104 yards, 3 TD
- CHI – Josh McCown, 27/36, 348 yards, 4 TD, 1 RUSH TD

**Top rushers**

- DAL – DeMarco Murray, 18 carries, 146 yards
- CHI – Matt Forté, 20 carries, 102 yards

**Top receivers**

- DAL – Terrance Williams, 2 receptions, 36 yards
- CHI – Matt Forté, 7 receptions, 73 yards, TD

**Top tacklers**

- DAL – Kyle Wilber, 9 tackles
- CHI – Zack Bowman, 7 tackles

The Bears announced on May 24, 2013, that they would retire former tight end and head coach Mike Ditka's number 89 jersey at the Bears-Cowboys halftime ceremony. The number was the last to be retired by the organization, with team chairman George McCaskey stating, "If there is going to be a last one, there is no more appropriate one than 89." During the ceremony, players from the 1985 Bears congratulated Ditka through messages on the videoboard. Ditka concluded his speech by saying, "Thank you, thank you, thank you. Go Bears!" The two teams had split their meetings 2–2 since 2004, Dallas winning in 2004 and 2007, and Chicago winning in 2010 and 2012.

Dallas opened the game with a 12-play, 75-yard drive ending with Tony Romo's 2-yard touchdown pass to Dez Bryant. The Bears scored the final touchdown of the first quarter on Josh McCown's 4-yard pass to Earl Bennett, the result of a 78-yard drive. With 8:58 left in the first half, McCown scored on a 7-yard run to take the lead 14–7, which the Cowboys answered with Romo's 10-yard pass to Jason Witten. After Robbie Gould kicked a 27-yard field goal, the Bears scored again after McCown threw a 25-yard touchdown pass to Alshon Jeffery, who caught the ball over B. W. Webb in the back of the endzone with 0:17 left in the half. On the first drive of the third quarter, Gould kicked a 34-yard field goal, which was bolstered by Matt Forté's 5-yard touchdown catch and Brandon Marshall scoring on a 2-point conversion to increase the score to 35–14. In the fourth quarter, Michael Bush scored on a 17-yard touchdown reception, and the Cowboys responded with a 9-yard touchdown catch by Cole Beasley. Gould eventually kicked a 23-yarder, while the Cowboys scored Joseph Randle's 1-yard run with six seconds to go. On the ensuing onside kick, the ball was recovered by Marshall, and McCown ran the clock out to seal the 45–28 win.

==== Week 15: at Cleveland Browns ====
Week Fifteen: Chicago Bears at Cleveland Browns – Game summary

Quarter	1	2	3	4	Total
**Bears**	0	10	7	21	**38**
Browns	3	7	14	7	**31**

at FirstEnergy Stadium, Cleveland, Ohio

- Date: December 15
- Game time: 1:00 pm. EST/12:00 pm. CST
- Game weather: 25 °F (−4 °C), flurries
- Game attendance: 71,513
- Referee: Jeff Triplette
- TV announcers (Fox): Thom Brennaman, Brian Billick and Laura Okmin
- Recap, Game book

Game information

**First quarter**

- CLE – Billy Cundiff 35-yard field goal, 7:26 (CLE 3–0)

**Second quarter**

- CHI – Robbie Gould 23-yard field goal, 12:55 (TIE 3–3)
- CLE – Tashaun Gipson 44-yard interception return, Billy Cundiff XP good, 8:01 (CLE 10–3)
- CHI – Brandon Marshall 5-yard pass from Jay Cutler, Robbie Gould XP good, 0:24 (TIE 10–10)

**Third quarter**

- CHI – Zack Bowman 43 interception return, Robbie Gould XP good, 13:48 (CHI 17–10)
- CLE – Edwin Baker 2-yard run, Billy Cundiff XP good, 8:20 (TIE 17–17)
- CLE – T. J. Ward 51-yard fumble return, Billy Cundiff XP good, 3:40 (CLE 24–17)

**Fourth quarter**

- CHI – Alshon Jeffery 45-yard pass from Jay Cutler, Robbie Gould XP good, 10:59 (TIE 24–24)
- CHI – Earl Bennett 4-yard pass from Jay Cutler, Robbie Gould XP good, 5:41 (CHI 31–24)
- CHI – Michael Bush 40-yard run, Robbie Gould XP good, 1:55 (CHI 38–24)
- CLE – Josh Gordon 43-yard pass from Jason Campbell, 0:59 (CHI 38–31)

**Top passers**

- CHI – Jay Cutler, 22/31, 265 yards, 3 TD, 2 INT
- CLE – Jason Campbell, 23/39, 273, TD, 2 INT

**Top rushers**

- CHI – Matt Forté, 24 carries, 127 yards
- CLE – Edwin Baker, 8 carries, 38 yards

**Top receivers**

- CHI – Brandon Marshall, 6 receptions, 95 yards, 1 TD
- CLE – Chris Ogbonnaya, 5 receptions, 39 yards

**Top tacklers**

- CHI – James Anderson, 11 tackles
- CLE – D'Qwell Jackson, 6 tackles

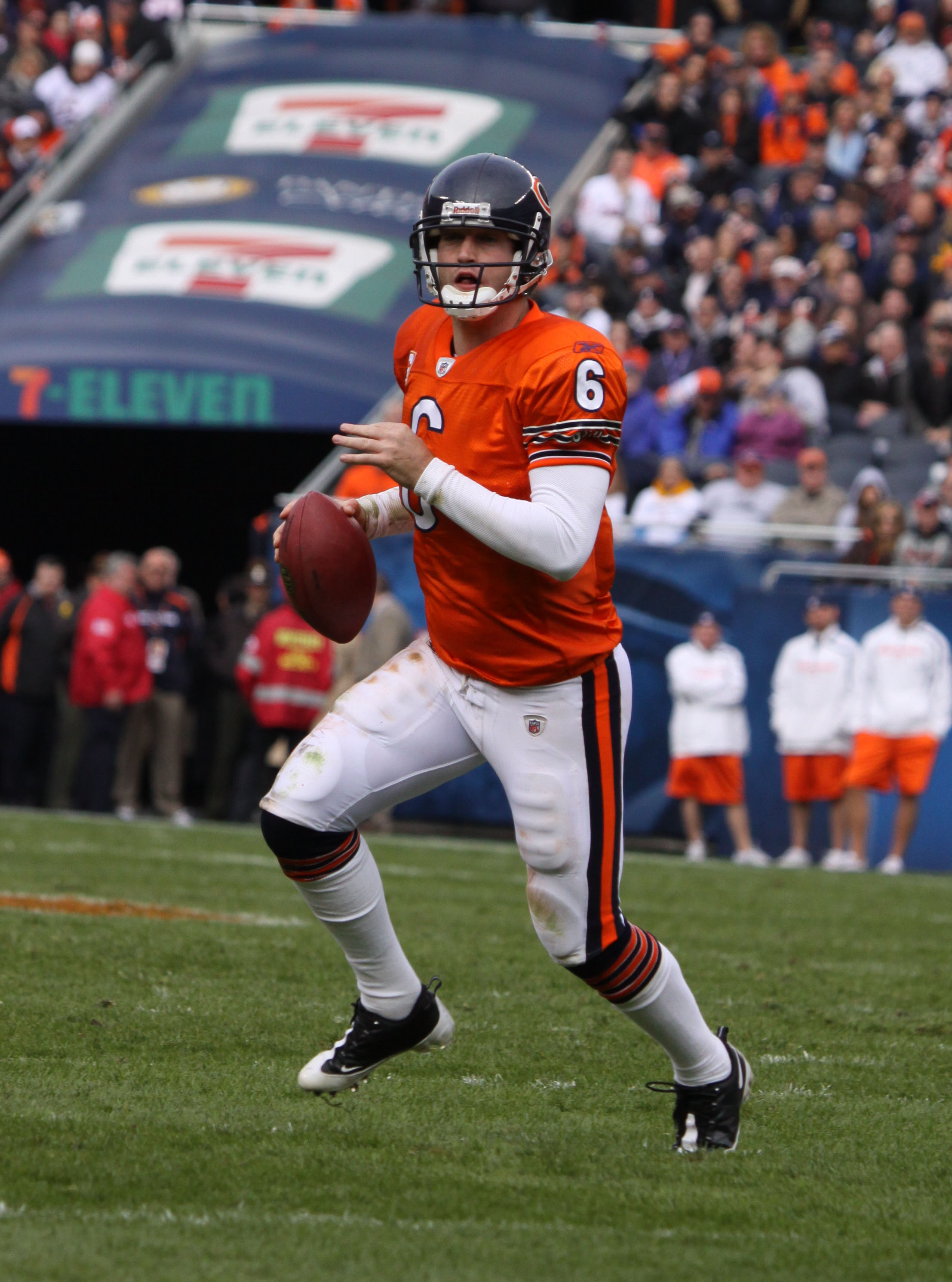
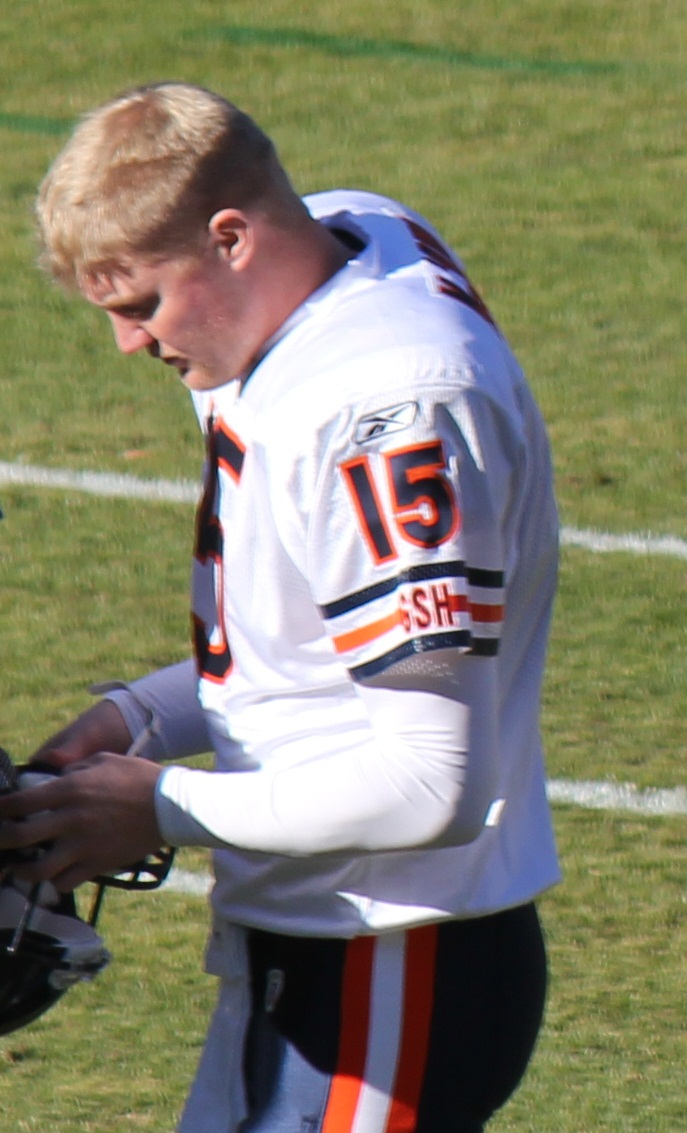
Controversy erupted over whether Jay Cutler (left) or Josh McCown (right) should be the starting quarterback

Jay Cutler made his return to action against the 4–9 Cleveland Browns, a move that was criticized by fans. In November, a poll conducted by the Chicago Sun-Times revealed that fans favored Josh McCown with 66.87 percent, with Cutler earning 29.31 percent. On December 9, ESPN analyst Skip Bayless tweeted, "As much as I've supported Vanderbilt's own Jay Cutler, I must admit Josh McCown runs this offense like he owns it." Bleacher Report's Dilan Ames stated that although Cutler is the better quarterback, his injury tendencies and inability to play a full season since 2009 had affected him, along with the statistics comparison between the two quarterbacks: Cutler has recorded 1,908 yards, 13 touchdowns and eight interceptions, while McCown has thrown for 1,809 yards, 13 touchdowns and one interception. However, Brandon Marshall defended Cutler's status as the starter, stating:

"Yes, Josh is doing well. You have to give him credit – he's playing lights out – one of the best quarterbacks playing right now. But Jay Cutler, he's a special guy. There are some things he can do that other quarterbacks can't. That's the physical part. But I put Jay Cutler in any room in the NFL, and he's the smartest guy in the room. So he brings a lot to the table.

McCown also acknowledged his backup position on the team, and told the Chicago Tribune, "The way that I serve my team is to play when the starter is not healthy. Jay is our starting quarterback, there is no doubt about that."

The Bears' opening drive ended at Cleveland's 14-yard line when Cutler had his pass tipped in the endzone by T. J. Ward and intercepted by Tashaun Gipson. The Browns then scored on Billy Cundiff's 35-yard field goal, which was tied by Robbie Gould kicking a 23-yarder. Eventually, the Bears reached the Browns' 24-yard line on another drive, and after a penalty on Alshon Jeffery forced the Bears to kick a 46-yard field goal, the score was nullified by Corey Wootton's holding penalty, forcing Chicago to punt. With 8:01 in the first half, Cutler was again intercepted by Gipson, who returned the pick 44 yards for a touchdown and the 10–3 lead. With 24 seconds remaining in the half, Cutler connected on a 5-yard touchdown pass with Marshall to close the half at 10–10. Cutler ended the first half with 13 of 19 passes completed for 168 yards, a touchdown and two interceptions. Early in the third quarter, Jason Campbell's pass for Greg Little was intercepted by Zack Bowman and returned 43 yards for the score. Cleveland's Edwin Baker eventually scored his first career NFL touchdown on a 2-yard run, and the Browns added to the score when Billy Winn punched the ball from Martellus Bennett, and Ward returned the fumble 52 yards for the 24–17 advantage. Eventually, Cutler guided the Bears from their own 5-yard line, culminating in a 45-yard touchdown pass to Jeffery after Gipson made an ill-timed leap and Julian Posey being unable to interrupt the play with 10:59 remaining. With 5:41 left in the game, Cutler threw a 5-yard pass to Earl Bennett to take the 31–24 lead, which was extended by Michael Bush on a 40-yard touchdown run. Cutler's touchdown pass to Bennett was the twenty-ninth passing touchdown of the season, which ties the team record set in 1947 and 1995. With 1:03 to go, Campbell threw a 43-yard touchdown pass to Josh Gordon, but the Bears recovered the ensuing onside kick to seal the victory, 38–31. The win marked the third time since 1970 that the Bears won all four games against an AFC division, and the first since 1986.

The following night, the Bears would jump to first place of the NFC North after the Lions were defeated by the Ravens. The Bears had the opportunity to clinch the division in week sixteen by defeating the Philadelphia Eagles, in addition to losses by the Packers and Lions.

==== Week 16: at Philadelphia Eagles ====
Week Sixteen: Chicago Bears at Philadelphia Eagles – Game summary

Quarter	1	2	3	4	Total
Bears	0	3	8	0	**11**
**Eagles**	21	3	9	21	**54**

at Lincoln Financial Field, Philadelphia, Pennsylvania

- Date: December 22
- Game time: 8:30 pm. EST/7:30 pm. CST
- Game weather: 62 °F (17 °C), cloudy
- Game attendance: 69,144
- Referee: Mike Carey
- TV announcers (NBC): Al Michaels, Cris Collinsworth and Michele Tafoya
- Recap, Game book

Game information

**First quarter**

- PHI – Riley Cooper, 5-yard pass from Nick Foles, Alex Henery XP good, 10:00 (PHI 7–0)
- PHI – LeSean McCoy, 1 yard run, Alex Henery XP good, 7:48 (PHI 14–0)
- PHI – Brent Celek, 10-yard pass from Foles, Alex Henery XP good, 1:33 (PHI 21–0)

**Second quarter**

- PHI – Alex Henery 49-yard field goal, 1:10 (PHI 24–0)
- CHI – Robbie Gould 50-yard field goal, 0:03 (PHI 24–3)

**Third quarter**

- PHI – Matt Forté tackled in end zone by Cedric Thornton for a safety, 9:52 (PHI 26–3)
- PHI – McCoy, 1 yard run, Alex Henery XP good, 7:17 (PHI 33–3)
- CHI – Brandon Marshall, 6-yard pass from Jay Cutler, Cutler pass to Earl Bennett for two-point conversion good, 0:00 (PHI 33–11)

**Fourth quarter**

- PHI – Chris Polk, 11-yard run, Alex Henery XP good, 11:19 (PHI 40–11)
- PHI – Brandon Boykin, 54-yard interception return, Alex Henery XP good, 8:10 (PHI 47–11)
- PHI – Bryce Brown, 65-yard run, Henery XP good, 6:14 (PHI 54–11)

**Top passers** **Top passers**

- CHI – Jay Cutler – 20/35, 222 yards, TD, INT
- PHI – Nick Foles – 21/25, 230 yards, 2 TD

**Top rushers**

- CHI – Matt Forté – 9 rushes, 29 yards
- PHI – LeSean McCoy – 18 rushes, 133 yards, 2 TD

**Top receivers**

- CHI – Martellus Bennett – 5 receptions, 85 yards; Alshon Jeffery – 6 receptions, 76 yards
- PHI – Brent Celek – 3 receptions, 58 yards, TD; McCoy – 6 receptions, 29 yards

**Top tacklers**

- CHI – Chris Conte – 10 tackles
- PHI – Bradley Fletcher – 7 tackles

Chicago entered week sixteen with a chance to clinch the NFC North in the event that the Packers and Lions lost. The Packers and Lions eventually lost to the Steelers and Giants, respectively, putting the Bears in position to win the division by defeating the Eagles. The last game between the Bears and Eagles was in 2011, when the Bears won 30–24; the Bears also lead the all-time series 30–12–1, though the Eagles had won six of the last ten meetings.

The Bears fell behind early in the first quarter when Nick Foles threw a 5-yard touchdown pass to Riley Cooper with 9:54 to go, followed by Devin Hester getting the ball stripped on the ensuing kickoff and Cary Williams recovering the loose ball. LeSean McCoy eventually scored on a 1-yard run with 7:44 in the first, and Philadelphia added to the scoring with Foles throwing a 10-yard touchdown pass to Brent Celek. After Alex Henery kicked a 49-yard field goal, the Bears scored their first points of the game with Robbie Gould's 50-yard field goal on the last play of the first half. In the second half, the Eagles scored off a safety after Cedric Thornton tackled Matt Forté. Philadelphia scored again after McCoy recorded another rushing touchdown. The Bears scored their first touchdown after Jay Cutler threw a 6-yard pass to Brandon Marshall, followed by a two-point conversion off Cutler's pass to Earl Bennett. With 11:19 remaining, Chris Polk scored on a 10-yard run to increase the score to 40–11, added by Brandon Boykin intercepting Cutler and scoring on a 54-yard return. Afterwards, Josh McCown filled in for Cutler. The Eagles scored again after Bryce Brown ran 65 yards for the touchdown to make the final score 54–11, the biggest blowout since a 47–0 loss to the Houston Oilers in 1977 and the second-most points allowed in team history, behind a 55–20 loss to Detroit in 1997.

The Bears failed to score 18 points for the first time in 2013, while allowing a season-high five sacks. Chicago also allowed two 100-yard rushers in the same game for the first time since 1976 against the Denver Broncos, with Norris Weese (120 yards) and Otis Armstrong (116 yards) guiding the Broncos to 28–14 win. After the game, Marc Trestman stated, "We are a team that was ready to play this game and we played a terrible football game for lack of a better word. I'm not going to use any word other than that. We were terrible in all three phases. We didn't play well in any phase of football."

==== Week 17: vs. Green Bay Packers ====
Week Seventeen: Green Bay Packers at Chicago Bears – Game summary

Quarter	1	2	3	4	Total
**Packers**	0	13	7	13	**33**
Bears	7	0	14	7	**28**

at Soldier Field, Chicago, Illinois

- Date: December 29
- Game time: 3:25 pm. CST
- Game weather: 26 °F (−3 °C), rain/snow mix
- Game attendance: 62,708
- Referee: Clete Blakeman
- TV announcers (Fox): Joe Buck, Troy Aikman and Pam Oliver
- Recap, Game book

Game information

**First quarter**

- CHI – Matt Forté 4-yard pass from Jay Cutler, Robbie Gould XP good, 02:12 (CHI 7–0)

**Second quarter**

- GB – Mason Crosby 33-yard field goal good, 08:04 (CHI 7–3)
- GB – Jarrett Boykin 15-yard run, Mason Crosby XP good, 03:34 (GB 10–7)
- GB – Mason Crosby 27-yard field goal good, 00:07 (GB 13–7)

**Third quarter**

- CHI – Matt Forté 5-yard run, Robbie Gould XP good, 10:51 (CHI 14–13)
- GB – Randall Cobb 7 yd. TD pass from Aaron Rodgers, Mason Crosby XP good, 07:32 (GB 20–14)
- CHI – Matt Forté 1 yard run, Robbie Gould XP good, 05:07 (CHI 21–20)

**Fourth quarter**

- CHI – Brandon Marshall 5-yard pass from Jay Cutler, Robbie Gould XP good, 15:00 (CHI 28–20)
- GB – Eddie Lacy 6-yard run, Mason Crosby XP good, 11:43 (CHI 28–27)
- GB – Randall Cobb 48-yard pass from Aaron Rodgers, Mason Crosby XP good, 00:46 (GB 33–28)

**Top passers**

- GB – Aaron Rodgers – 25/39, 318 yards, 2 TD, 2 INT
- CHI – Jay Cutler – 15/24, 226 yards, 2 TD, 1 INT

**Top rushers**

- GB – James Starks – 11 carries, 88 yards
- CHI – Matt Forté – 22 carries, 110 yards, 2 TD

**Top receivers**

- GB – Jordy Nelson – 10 receptions, 161 yards
- CHI – Alshon Jeffery – 3 receptions, 80 yards

**Top tacklers**

- GB – Mike Neal – 5 tackles, 1 assists
- CHI – James Anderson – 12 tackles, 1 sack

In the season-ender against the Packers for the NFC North title, Aaron Rodgers made his return to action for the first time since week 9 against the Bears, who intend to sweep the Packers for the first time since 2007. The Packers had fallen to 2–5–1 without Rodgers, and entered the game with a 7–7–1 record.

After the Bears punted on the opening drive, the Packers reached Chicago's five-yard line, but Rodgers was intercepted by Chris Conte. Chicago scored on the following possession with Forté's four-yard run. In the second quarter, Rodgers was intercepted by Tim Jennings. After the Packers scored on Mason Crosby's 33-yard field goal, Devin Hester fumbled on the kickoff, but recovered; the Bears would be forced to punt. After Green Bay reached Chicago's 17-yard line, Rodgers was hit by Julius Peppers, with the ball leaving his hand as his arm went forward; the players did not attempt to recover the ball, as if it was an incompletion, but the referees did not consider the play dead. Jarrett Boykin subsequently picked up the ball, and scored on the play. On the Bears' next drive, Cutler's pass to Alshon Jeffery was stripped by Tramon Williams, and was recovered by Morgan Burnett. Crosby scored the final score of the first half with a 27-yard field goal. In the third quarter, the Bears regained the lead with Forté's five-yard touchdown run. Both teams exchanged scores on the next two drives of the game, with the Packers scoring on Rodgers' seven-yard touchdown throw to Randall Cobb, followed by Forté's one-yard touchdown run, ending the quarter with the Bears leading 21–20. On the first play of the final quarter, Cutler threw a five-yard touchdown pass to Brandon Marshall, which the Packers retaliated with Eddie Lacy's six-yard touchdown run. After the Bears punted, the Packers reached the Bears' 48-yard line with 48 seconds left. Defensive coordinator Mel Tucker called a blitz, but Conte failed to apply man-to-man coverage, allowing Cobb to score the game-winning touchdown. However, the Packers failed the two-point conversion, making the score 33–28. The Bears received the ball with 38 seconds left, and reached the Packers' 45-yard line, where Cutler's Hail Mary pass for Marshall was intercepted by Sam Shields as time expired.

The season marked the sixth time in the previous seven years the Bears missed the playoffs. Despite forcing two turnovers, the Bears defense allowed the Packers to record 473 yards, convert 9 of 18 third down plays, a 35:09 time of possession and run 76 plays in comparison to Chicago's 49.

=== Standings ===
==== Division ====
NFC North
	W	L	T	PCT	DIV	CONF	PF	PA	STK
^{(4)} Green Bay Packers	8	7	1	.531	3–2–1	6–5–1	417	428	W1
Chicago Bears	8	8	0	.500	2–4	4–8	445	478	L2
Detroit Lions	7	9	0	.438	4–2	6–6	395	376	L4
Minnesota Vikings	5	10	1	.344	2–3–1	4–7–1	391	480	W1

==== Conference ====
NFC
#	Team	Division	W	L	T	PCT	DIV	CONF	SOS	SOV	STK
**Division winners**
1	Seattle Seahawks	West	13	3	0	.813	4–2	10–2	.490	.445	W1
2	Carolina Panthers	South	12	4	0	.750	5–1	9–3	.494	.451	W3
3	Philadelphia Eagles	East	10	6	0	.625	4–2	9–3	.453	.391	W2
4	Green Bay Packers	North	8	7	1	.531	3–2–1	6–5–1	.453	.371	W1
**Wild cards**
5	San Francisco 49ers	West	12	4	0	.750	5–1	9–3	.494	.414	W6
6	New Orleans Saints	South	11	5	0	.688	5–1	9–3	.516	.455	W1
**Did not qualify for the postseason**
7	Arizona Cardinals	West	10	6	0	.625	2–4	6–6	.531	.444	L1
8 (Note: Chicago defeated Dallas head-to-head (Week 14, 45–28).)	Chicago Bears	North	8	8	0	.500	2–4	4–8	.465	.469	L2
9	Dallas Cowboys	East	8	8	0	.500	5–1	7–5	.484	.363	L1
10 (Note: The NY Giants and Detroit finished with a better conference record than St. Louis.) (Note: The NY Giants defeated Detroit head-to-head (Week 16, 23–20 (OT)).)	New York Giants	East	7	9	0	.438	3–3	6–6	.520	.366	W2
11 (Note: Detroit finished with a better conference record than St. Louis.)	Detroit Lions	North	7	9	0	.438	4–2	6–6	.457	.402	L4
12	St. Louis Rams	West	7	9	0	.438	1–5	4–8	.551	.446	L1
13	Minnesota Vikings	North	5	10	1	.344	2–3–1	4–7–1	.512	.450	W1
14 (Note: Atlanta finished with a better conference record than Tampa Bay.)	Atlanta Falcons	South	4	12	0	.250	1–5	3–9	.553	.313	L2
15	Tampa Bay Buccaneers	South	4	12	0	.250	1–5	2–10	.574	.391	L3
16	Washington Redskins	East	3	13	0	.188	0–6	1–11	.516	.438	L8
**Tiebreakers** (Note: When breaking ties for three or more teams under the NFL's rules, they are first broken within divisions, then comparing only the highest-ranked remaining team from each division.)

== Statistics ==
Statistically, the Bears offense greatly improved from its 2012 counterpart. The 2013 offense ended the year with the second-best scoring offense with 445 points, behind the Denver Broncos; the previous year the Bears offense ranked 16th at 375 total points and 23.4 PPG. The 2012 team also was ranked 29th in passing yards with 2999, while the 2013 team improved to fifth with 4,281 yards. The offense also broke team records in total yards (6,109), passing yards (4,450), passing touchdowns (32), first downs (344) and passer rating (96.9), while falling short of the 1985 team's record of points scored in a season by 11, ending with 445.

However, the defense struggled mightily throughout the season, ranking 30th in the NFL, with injuries ending the seasons of five players: defensive tackles Henry Melton and Nick Collins, cornerbacks Kelvin Hayden and Charles Tillman, and linebacker D. J. Williams. After having the fifth-ranked defense in the league in 2012, the 2013 team allowed franchise-records in yards allowed (6,313), rushing yards allowed (2,583) and points (478), ranking 29th in the NFL in points allowed per game with 29.9. The team also allowed a league-worst 5.35 rushing yards per carry, making the 2013 Bears the only team in the NFL to allow five yards per carry during the season. In third-down stops, the Bears ranked 25th. Additionally, the defense tied the Jacksonville Jaguars for the fewest sacks in the league with 31. Regarding the defense, Chicago Tribune writer Steve Rosenbloom wrote, "Under Angelo and Smith, the Bears couldn't win enough games where they needed only three offensive touchdowns. Under Emery and Trestman, the Bears couldn't win enough games where they needed to hold opponents to only three offensive touchdowns."

=== Position reviews ===
Together, quarterbacks Jay Cutler and Josh McCown broke team records in touchdown passes (32), passing yards (4,450), completion percentage (64.4) and passer rating (96.9). Individually, in eleven games, Cutler completed 63.1 percent of his passes for 2,621 yards with 19 touchdowns, 12 interceptions, and a career-high 89.2 passer rating. In the other five games, McCown completed 66.8 percent of passes for 1,829 yards, 13 touchdowns, one interception, and a 109 passer rating, which ranked third in the NFL behind Denver's Peyton Manning and Philadelphia's Nick Foles. Running back Matt Forte had 1,339 rushing yards, a career-high, while wide receivers Brandon Marshall and Alshon Jeffery had 1,200 receiving yards each, as the Bears became the first team to accomplish the feat since the 2002 Buffalo Bills. Marshall was also ranked the best receiver by Pro Football Focus with a score of 37.8, 13.1 higher than Green Bay's Jordy Nelson. The offensive line was also drastically changed from its 2012 counterpart, allowing the fourth-fewest sacks in the league with 30, compared to allowing the eighth-most in 2012 with 44.

On special teams, Robbie Gould tied his team record for the highest field goal percentage with 89.7 by converting 26 of 29 field goals. Gould also became the second player in franchise history to reach 1,000 career points during the season. However, punter Adam Podlesh ranked 33rd in the league in gross average punting yards with 40.6. In comparison with his 2012 stats, Podlesh was 18th in the league in net punting average with 39.4 yards, 34 punts landing inside the 20-yard line with 6 touchbacks. In 2013, he dropped to 29th in the former category with 37.9 yards, 27 punts inside the 20 and four fewer touchbacks. The punting corps also ranked last in the league in gross punting with 40 yards. In the return game, Devin Hester led the league in kickoff return yards with 1,442 and was fifth in kickoff return average with 27.7 yards. Linebacker Blake Costanzo led all Bears gunners with 17 tackles. Cornerback Sherrick McManis ranked second with 15, followed by safety Craig Steltz (14), receiver Eric Weems (13) and safety Anthony Walters (10). Ultimately, the Bears' special teams ranked 23rd in the NFL, leading the league in kickoff coverage after allowing 18.7 yards per return.

== Awards and records ==
=== Awards ===
On December 27, Brandon Marshall and Matt Forte were named to the 2014 Pro Bowl, the fewest Bears sent since 2009, when two were also sent, and the first time a Bears defensive player was not invited since 2004. On January 14, 2014, Marshall and Forte were named to the Pro Football Writers Association's All-NFC Team. On January 3, 2014, the Associated Press released its annual All-Pro team, with no Bears named. On January 9, 2014, Alshon Jeffery was named to the Pro Bowl after an injury to Calvin Johnson. Jeffery was later named the PFWA's Most Improved Player on January 17. On January 20, Tim Jennings and Kyle Long were named to the Pro Bowl, replacing Richard Sherman of the Seattle Seahawks, who advanced to Super Bowl XLVIII and Mike Iupati suffered an injury, respectively. Long's invitation marked the first time a Bears rookie was invited since special teamer Johnny Knox in 2009, and the first offensive rookie since Gale Sayers in 1965. The four offensive Pro Bowlers are the most sent by the Bears since 1985, when Jim McMahon, Walter Payton, Jay Hilgenberg and Jim Covert were invited to the game. Forte, Marshall and Jeffery's invitations also marked the first time since 1985 the Bears sent multiple skill position players, and the most sent by the team since 1963 with Bill Wade, Joe Marconi and Mike Ditka. Forte, Marshall and Jeffery were eventually drafted in the fantasy draft by Team Rice, while Long and Jennings were assigned to Team Sanders. In the 22–21 victory for Team Rice, Forte ran for 31 yards on six attempts while catching three passes for 24 yards. Jeffery and Marshall recorded two and one catch for 22 and 21 yards, respectively. For Team Sanders, Jennings recorded three tackles, while Long assisted in shoving Cam Newton into the endzone.

On January 8, 2014, Long was named to the Pro Football Focus All-Rookie Team. On January 15, Gil Brandt named Long to the NFL.com All-Rookie Team. On January 24, Josh McCown and Matt Slauson were named to the USA Today All-Joe Team, which honors players who have never been invited to a Pro Bowl. Prior to the 3rd NFL Honors, Matt Forte was nominated for FedEx Ground Player of the Year against Philadelphia's LeSean McCoy and Kansas City's Jamaal Charles, but lost to McCoy. During the show, Charles Tillman was awarded the Walter Payton NFL Man of the Year Award for his charitable work in the Chicago area.

==== Weekly awards ====
- In week two against the Vikings, Devin Hester was named NFC Special Teams Player of the Week on September 18.
- In week nine against the Packers, Shea McClellin recorded three sacks, and was named NFC Defensive Player of the Week on November 6.
- After scoring five touchdowns in week fourteen against the Cowboys, the most by a Bears quarterback since Jack Concannon in 1972, Josh McCown was named the NFC Offensive Player of the Week on December 11.

=== Records ===
==== Team ====
===== Season =====
- The Bears offense broke four team records in 2013: the most total yards with 6,109, the most passing yards with 4,450, the most passing touchdowns with 32, and the most first downs with 344.
- The defense set three franchise records during the season, which included allowing the most yards in team history with 6,313, along with the most rushing yards allowed with 2,583, and the most points allowed with 478.

==== Individual ====
===== Game =====
- In week one against the Bengals, Robbie Gould kicked and made the longest field goal attempt in franchise and Soldier Field history with a 58-yard attempt made in week one against the Bengals.
- In week two, Devin Hester set a franchise record for the most kick return yards in a game with 249 kickoff return yards against the Vikings. The previous record of 225 yards was also held by Hester.
- In week thirteen against Minnesota, Alshon Jeffery broke the franchise record for the most receiving yards in a game.

== Staff ==
2013 Chicago Bears staff
Front office: Secretary of the board of directors – Virginia Halas McCaskey; Chairman – George McCaskey; President/CEO – Ted Phillips; general manager – Phil Emery; Vice president of football administration/general counsel – Cliff Stein; Director of pro personnel – Kevin Turks; Assistant director of pro personnel – Dwayne Joseph; Director of college scouting – Marty Barrett; Head coaches: Head coach – Marc Trestman; Assistant head coach/special teams coordinator – Joe DeCamillis; Offensive coaches: Offensive coordinator/offensive line – Aaron Kromer; Quarterbacks – Matt Cavanaugh; Running backs – Skip Peete; Wide receivers – Mike Groh; Tight ends – Andy Bischoff; Assistant offensive line – Pat Meyer; Offensive quality control – Brendan Nugent; Offensive quality control – Carson Walch	Defensive coaches: Defensive coordinator – Mel Tucker; Defensive line – Mike Phair; Assistant defensive line – Michael Sinclair; Linebackers – Tim Tibesar; Defensive backs – Jon Hoke; Defensive quality control – Chris Harris; Defensive quality control – Sean Desai; Special teams coaches: Assistant special teams – Dwayne Stukes; Strength and conditioning: Strength and conditioning – Mike Clark; Strength and conditioning assistant – Jim Arthur; Conditioning assistant – Phil Brauch

== Final roster ==
2013 Chicago Bears roster
Quarterbacks (QB): 6 Jay Cutler; 12 Josh McCown; 2 Jordan Palmer; Running backs (RB): 29 Michael Bush; 43 Tony Fiammetta FB; 32 Michael Ford; 22 Matt Forté; Wide receivers (WR): 80 Earl Bennett; 17 Alshon Jeffery; 15 Brandon Marshall; 14 Eric Weems; 82 Chris Williams; 10 Marquess Wilson; Tight ends (TE): 83 Martellus Bennett; 88 Dante Rosario	Offensive linemen (OL): 60 Taylor Boggs C; 62 Eben Britton G/T; 78 James Brown T/G; 74 Jermon Bushrod T; 63 Roberto Garza C; 76 Joe Long T; 75 Kyle Long G; 67 Jordan Mills T; 79 Jonathan Scott T; 68 Matt Slauson G; Defensive linemen (DL): 91 David Bass DE; 97 Landon Cohen DT; 99 Shea McClellin DE; 95 Cheta Ozougwu DE; 92 Stephen Paea DT; 90 Julius Peppers DE; 96 Jay Ratliff DT; 94 Cornelius Washington DE; 98 Corey Wootton DT/DE	Linebackers (LB): 50 James Anderson OLB; 57 Jon Bostic MLB; 55 Lance Briggs OLB; 52 Blake Costanzo OLB; 53 Jerry Franklin MLB; 59 Khaseem Greene OLB; Defensive backs (DB): 38 Zack Bowman CB; 47 Chris Conte FS; 31 Isaiah Frey CB; 26 Tim Jennings CB; 39 Derrick Martin CB; 27 Sherrick McManis CB; 20 Craig Steltz SS; 37 Anthony Walters FS; 21 Major Wright SS; Special teams (ST): 9 Robbie Gould K; 23 Devin Hester RS; 65 Patrick Mannelly LS; 8 Adam Podlesh P	Practice squad: 36 Sean Cattouse S; 70 Rogers Gaines T; 30 Demontre Hurst CB; 84 Fendi Onobun TE; 72 Tracy Robertson DT; 81 Terrence Toliver WR; 25 C. J. Wilson CB; 49 Lawrence Wilson LB; Reserve: 93 Nate Collins DT (IR); 24 Kelvin Hayden CB (IR); 69 Henry Melton DT (IR); 33 Charles Tillman CB (IR/DFR); 58 D. J. Williams MLB (IR); Rookies in italics 53 active, 5 reserve, 8 practice squad
