= Brandon Hartson =

American football player (born 1989)

Profile
- Position: Long snapper

Personal information
- Born: October 3, 1989 (age 37); Houston, Texas, U.S.
- Listed height: 6 ft 4 in (1.93 m)
- Listed weight: 245 lb (111 kg)

Career information
- High school: Fairfield HS
- College: Houston
- NFL draft: 2013: undrafted

Career history
- Chicago Bears (2013–2014)*; Kansas City Chiefs (2014–2015)*; Pittsburgh Steelers (2015)*; Tampa Bay Buccaneers (2015)*; Dallas Cowboys (2016)*
- * Offseason or practice squad member only

Awards and highlights
- Second-team All-C-USA (2012)
- Stats at Pro Football Reference

Brandon Hartson (born October 3, 1989) is an American former football player who was a long snapper. He played college football at Houston.

== Professional career ==
=== Chicago Bears ===
Hartson was signed by the Chicago Bears as an undrafted free agent on August 10, 2013, and released by the team on August 30. He re-signed with the Bears on December 30, 2013, and was released on August 31, 2014.

=== Kansas City Chiefs ===
Hartson signed with the Kansas City Chiefs on January 20, 2015. He was released by the Chiefs on April 16, 2015.

=== Pittsburgh Steelers ===
Hartson was acquired from waivers by the Pittsburgh Steelers on April 17, 2015, and released by the team on May 9.

=== Tampa Bay Buccaneers ===
Hartson signed with the Tampa Bay Buccaneers on August 27, 2015. He was released by the Buccaneers on August 30, 2015.

=== Dallas Cowboys ===
On March 31, 2016, Hartson signed with the Dallas Cowboys. He was released by the team on May 16, 2016.
