= Fendi Onobun =

American football player (born 1986)

No. 48, 85
- Position: Tight end

Personal information
- Born: November 17, 1986 (age 39); Houston, Texas, U.S.
- Listed height: 6 ft 6 in (1.98 m)
- Listed weight: 249 lb (113 kg)

Career information
- High school: Alief Taylor (Houston)
- College: Houston
- NFL draft: 2010: 6th round, 170th overall pick

Career history
- St. Louis Rams (2010); Seattle Seahawks (2011)*; Washington Redskins (2011)*; Jacksonville Jaguars (2011); Buffalo Bills (2011); Chicago Bears (2013–2014)*; Jacksonville Jaguars (2014)
- * Offseason or practice squad member only

Career NFL statistics
- Receptions: 2
- Receiving yards: 15
- Stats at Pro Football Reference

Fendi Onobun (born November 17, 1986) is an American former professional football player who was a tight end in the National Football League (NFL). He was selected by the St. Louis Rams in the sixth round of the 2010 NFL draft. He played college football for the Houston Cougars. He was also a member of the Seattle Seahawks, Washington Redskins, Jacksonville Jaguars, Buffalo Bills, and Chicago Bears.

== College career ==
Onobun began his college career playing basketball at The University of Arizona in 2006. He was recruited by Lute Olson.

Onobun played four years of basketball at the University of Arizona. He joined the Houston Cougars football team in 2009 and played an important role on special teams. He appeared in 11 games and hauled in a 15-yard catch against SMU for the first reception of his career. Onobun blocked two extra points against C-USA rival Southern Miss and caught an 18-yard touchdown against Memphis.

== Professional career ==
Pre-draft measurables
Height	Weight	Arm length	Hand span	40-yard dash	10-yard split	20-yard split	20-yard shuttle	Three-cone drill	Vertical jump	Broad jump	Bench press	Wonderlic
6 ft 5 1/2 in (1.97 m)	252 lb (114 kg)	32 3/4 in (0.83 m)	10 1/4 in (0.26 m)	4.48 s	x s	x s	4.15 s	6.78 s	37 1/2 in (0.95 m)	11 ft 1 in (3.38 m)	16 reps	x
Values from Houston NFL pro day

=== St. Louis Rams ===
Onobun signed a four-year $1.92 million deal with a signing bonus of $129,000. Onobun, considered a risky pick, made the St. Louis Rams opening day roster in 2010. He was waived during final cuts on September 3, 2011.

=== Seattle Seahawks ===
On September 13, 2011, the Seattle Seahawks signed Onobun to their practice squad.

=== Washington Redskins ===
Onobun was signed to the practice squad of the Washington Redskins on November 9, 2011.

=== Jacksonville Jaguars (first stint) ===
The Jacksonville Jaguars signed Onobun off of the Washington Redskins' practice squad on November 14, 2011. He was waived on December 6.

=== Buffalo Bills ===
The Buffalo Bills signed Onobun on December 9, 2011. He was cut on August 26, 2012.

=== Chicago Bears ===
On January 10, 2013, the Chicago Bears signed Onobun. Onobun was cut on August 30, 2013. On September 1, Onobun was signed to the Bears practice squad. Onobun was cut on June 19, 2014.

=== Jacksonville Jaguars (second stint) ===
Onobun was signed by the Jaguars on August 7, 2014. He was waived/injured on August 20 and spent the season on injured reserve. He became a free agent after the 2014 season.
