= Rogers Gaines =

American gridiron football player (born 1989)

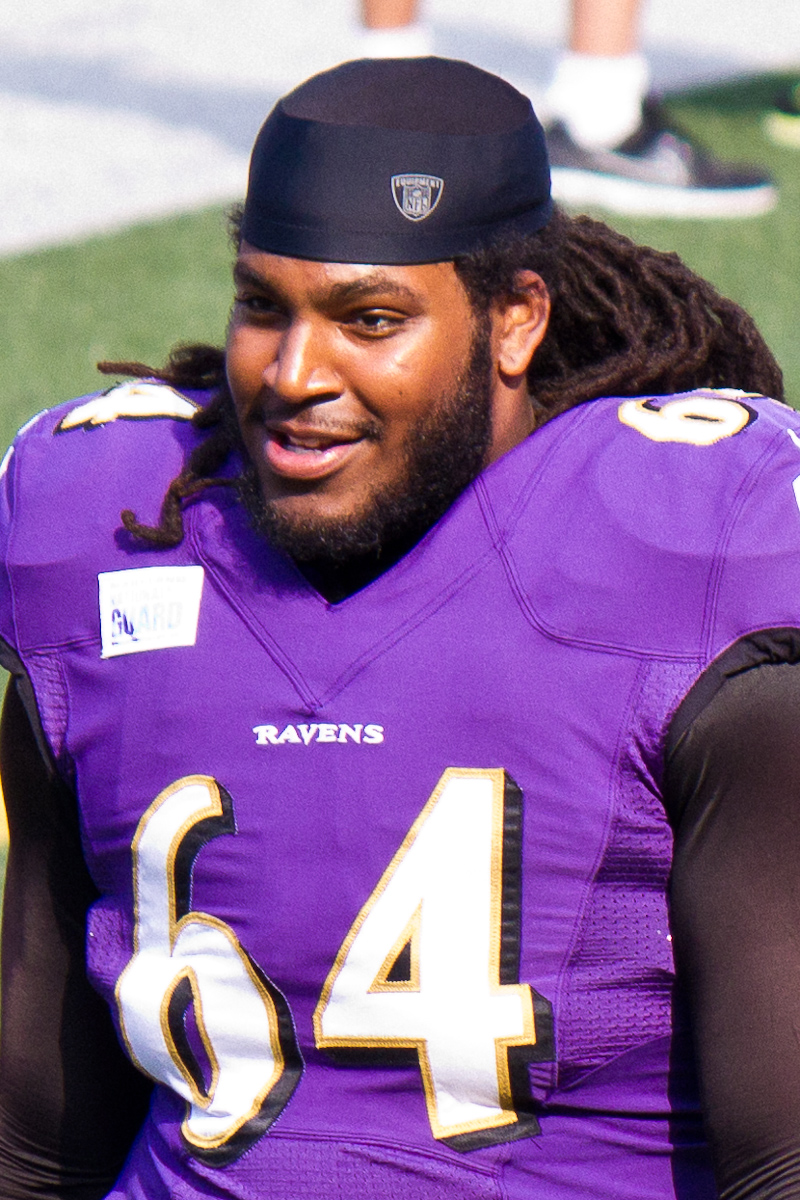
- Gaines at Ravens' M&T Bank Stadium practice in August 2013.

No. 59
- Position: Offensive tackle

Personal information
- Born: June 24, 1989 (age 37); Goodlettsville, Tennessee
- Listed height: 6 ft 6 in (1.98 m)
- Listed weight: 323 lb (147 kg)

Career information
- College: Tennessee State
- NFL draft: 2013: undrafted

Career history
- Baltimore Ravens (2013)*; Chicago Bears (2013–2014)*; New York Giants (2014); BC Lions (2016)*
- * Offseason or practice squad member only
- Stats at Pro Football Reference

Rogers Gaines (born June 24, 1989) is an American former football offensive tackle. He played college football at Tennessee State.

== Early life ==
He is the son of Rogers and Laurita Gaines.

He attended White House High School (Sumner County) in White House, TN. He was selected to the All-Region and All-State teams while he was at high school.

Gaines was a two-year starter at defensive tackle and then switched to offense at left tackle for his senior season for the Blue Devils, grading out at 85 percent blocking with 80 pancake blocks and no sacks allowed in 133 attempts. The Blue Devils had two 1,000-yard rushers and a 1,000-yard passer behind Gaines, and he was rewarded for his efforts as a top-three finalist for the Tennessee Titans Mr. Football Awards in Class 3-A for Lineman. The winner of the award in his category was future Alabama and National Football League standout Don't'a Hightower of Marshall County.

The Blue Devils were the Region 4-3A co-champions in 2007 and finished 9-4 with a trip to the state quarterfinals in Class 3-A. For his career on defense, he had 92 tackles including 13 for losses, one forced fumble and five sacks. He participated in the 2006 Elite Football Combine as one of the top 60 players in the state of Tennessee.

For his achievements, as a senior, he was named the Region 4-3A Offensive Lineman of the Year, and a member of The All-Midstate Team (The Tennessean), The All-County Team (The News Examiner) and the All-State teams for the Tennessee Football Coaches Association and the Tennessee Sports Writers Association.

The 6-foot-7, 332-pound lineman was also an All-State basketball player for the Blue Devils.

== College career ==
He was selected to the 2011 All-OVC Second-team. He also was selected to the 2012 Preseason Phil Steele Second-team All-American team.

As a senior, he was First-team Ohio Valley Conference. Gaines was named to the HBCU Huddle/College Sporting News All-American Team for 2012, his senior season. Gaines was a part of a TSU offensive line that led the Ohio Valley Conference in rushing at 175.7 yards per game. The senior did not give up a sack all season and graded out at a 93.6. Gaines was also named to the BOXTOROW All-American Team and The Sports Network FCS and Associated Press All-American Team.

== Professional career ==
=== 2013 NFL Combine ===
Pre-draft measurables
Height	Weight	Arm length	Hand span	40-yard dash	20-yard shuttle	Vertical jump	Bench press
6 ft 6 in (1.98 m)	334 lb (151 kg)	36 1/4 in (0.92 m)	10 5/8 in (0.27 m)	5.24 s	5.24 s	23.0 in (0.58 m)	28 reps
All values from the NFL Combine

Gaines graded out at 60.9 and was a late-round NFL draft projection, but was not selected in the NFL draft and signed as an undrafted free agent.

=== Baltimore Ravens ===
On May 3, 2013, he signed with the Baltimore Ravens as an undrafted free agent.

=== Chicago Bears ===
On September 24, 2013, he was signed to the Chicago Bears' practice squad.

=== New York Giants ===
On May 31, 2014, he was signed to the New York Giants.

=== BC Lions ===
On April 12, 2016, Gaines signed with the BC Lions of the Canadian Football League. He was released by the team on June 12, 2016.
