= Sean Cattouse =

American football player (born 1988)

No. 43, 36
- Position: Safety

Personal information
- Born: October 4, 1988 (age 38); Chicago, Illinois, U.S.
- Listed height: 6 ft 2 in (1.88 m)
- Listed weight: 206 lb (93 kg)

Career information
- High school: Hubbard (Chicago)
- College: California (2007–2011)
- NFL draft: 2012: undrafted

Career history
- San Diego Chargers (2012); Chicago Bears (2013)
- Stats at Pro Football Reference

Sean Cattouse (born October 4, 1988) is an American former professional football safety who played for the San Diego Chargers and Chicago Bears of the National Football League (NFL). He played college football at the University of California, Berkeley.

== Early life and college ==
Sean Cattouse was born October 4, 1988, in Chicago, Illinois. He attended Hubbard High School in Chicago.

Cattouse played college football for the California Golden Bears of the University of California, Berkeley. He was redshirted in 2007 and was a four-year letterman from 2008 to 2011.

== Professional career ==
Cattouse was signed by the NFL's San Diego Chargers on April 30, 2012, after going undrafted in the 2012 NFL draft. He made his NFL debut on December 30, 2012, against the Oakland Raiders. He was released by the Chargers on August 30, 2013.

Cattouse spent the 2013 season with the Chicago Bears of the NFL. He was released by the Bears on June 19, 2014.

== Personal life ==
Cattouse began to work as a physical education teacher at Muchin College Prep during the 2015–16 school year. He is currently a physical education teacher at Rauner College Prep High School in Chicago.
