= Cyhl Quarles =

American football player (born 1989)

No. 43, 44
- Position: Strong safety

Personal information
- Born: April 6, 1989 (age 37); Tucker, Georgia
- Listed height: 6 ft 3 in (1.91 m)
- Listed weight: 212 lb (96 kg)

Career information
- High school: Norcross (GA) Meadowcreek
- College: Wake Forest
- NFL draft: 2012: undrafted

Career history
- Baltimore Ravens (2012)*; New England Patriots (2012)*; Chicago Bears (2013)*
- * Offseason or practice squad member only
- Stats at Pro Football Reference

Cyhl Quarles (pronounced "Kyle") (born April 6, 1989) is an American former football strong safety. He signed with the Baltimore Ravens as an undrafted free agent. He played college football at Wake Forest.

== Early life ==
Quarles grew up on Singleton Road in the neighborhood of Gladiator, which is located in Norcross, Georgia. Quarles attended Meadowcreek High School, also in Norcross. Quarles was ranked as the 88th-best safety nationally by Scout and also was ranked as 49th-best prospect of the state of Georgia. He was a sprinter on the track high school team in which he ran the 100 meter dash 10.68 seconds. Quarles was named the Atlanta Journal-Constitution Defensive Player of the Week once during high school.

College recruiting
Name	Hometown	School	Height	Weight	40^{‡}	Commit date
Cyhl Quarles; Outside linebacker	Norcross, Georgia	Meadowcreek High School	6 ft 1 in (1.85 m)	191 lb (87 kg)	4.92	Sep 21, 2006
Cyhl Quarles; Outside linebacker	Recruit ratings: Scout: Rivals:					
Overall recruit ranking: Scout: 90 (S) Rivals: -- (OLB), -- (G)
‡ Refers to 40-yard dash; Note: In many cases, Scout, Rivals, 247Sports, On3, and ESPN may conflict in their listings of height, weight and 40 time.; In these cases, the average was taken. ESPN grades are on a 100-point scale.; Sources: "Wake Forest Football Commitments". Rivals.; "2007 Wake Forest Football Recruiting Commits". Scout.; "Scout.com Team Recruiting Rankings". Scout.; "2007 Team Ranking". Rivals.com.

== College career ==
Quarles played at Wake Forest. For his career at Wake Forest, he finished with 239 tackles, 2 interceptions, 6 passes defended and one forced fumble.

In his senior year, he had a career-high 101 tackles, 3 passes defended and 2 fumble recoveries. On September 1, 2011, he had 10 tackles against Syracuse in the season opener but Wake Forest loss 36-29 in overtime. On September 10, 2011, he recorded 12 tackles along with one pass deflection against North Carolina State helping Wake Forest win 34-27. On September 17, 2011, he recorded 5 tackles against Gardner–Webb helping Wake Forest win that game 48-5.

In his junior year, he had 71 tackles, one interception, one forced fumble and one passes defended.

In his sophomore year, he had 62 tackles, one interception, 2 passes defended for the season.

In his freshman year, he only had 5 tackles for the entire season.

== Professional career ==
=== 2012 NFL Combine ===
Pre-draft measurables
Height	Weight	Arm length	Hand span	40-yard dash	20-yard shuttle	Three-cone drill	Vertical jump	Broad jump	Bench press
6 ft 1 in (1.85 m)	223 lb (101 kg)	32 in (0.81 m)	9 in (0.23 m)	4.53 s	4.32 s	7.21 s	32.5 in (0.83 m)	119 ft 0 in (36.27 m)	19.0 reps
All values from the NFL Combine

=== Baltimore Ravens ===
On April 30, 2012, Quarles signed with the Baltimore Ravens as an undrafted free agent. On August 31, 2012, he was released.

=== New England Patriots ===
On September 12, 2012, Quarles signed with the New England Patriots to join their practice squad. On September 28, 2012, Quarles was released from the practice squad. On December 26, 2012, Quarles re-signed with the team to join the practice squad.

=== Chicago Bears ===
On January 28, 2013, Quarles signed with the Chicago Bears to a reserve/future contract.

On August 11, 2013, Quarles was waived by the Bears.
