= C. J. Wilson (cornerback) =

American football player (born 1989)

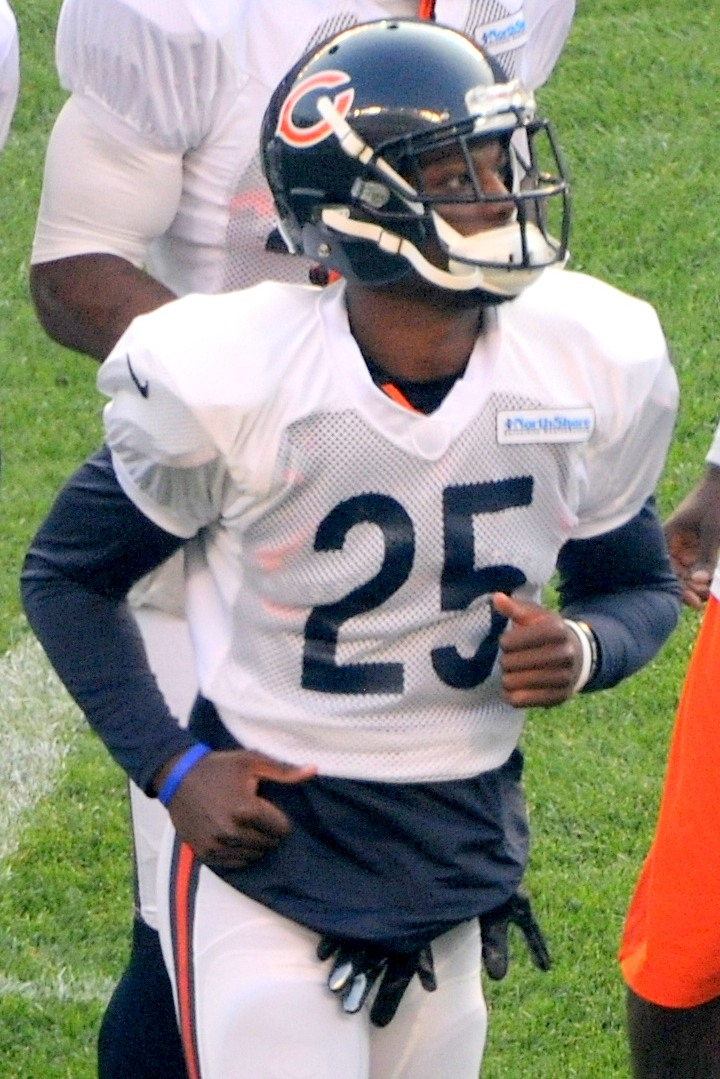
- Wilson at Chicago Bears training camp in 2014

No. 25, 41
- Position: Cornerback

Personal information
- Born: November 18, 1989 (age 37); Lincolnton, North Carolina, U.S.
- Listed height: 5 ft 11 in (1.80 m)
- Listed weight: 187 lb (85 kg)

Career information
- High school: Lincolnton
- College: NC State (2008–2012)
- NFL draft: 2013: undrafted

Career history
- Chicago Bears (2013); Tampa Bay Buccaneers (2014)

Career NFL statistics
- Total tackles: 5
- Stats at Pro Football Reference

C. J. Wilson (born November 18, 1989) is an American former professional football player who was a cornerback in the National Football League (NFL). He was signed by the Chicago Bears as an undrafted free agent in 2013. He was also a member of the Tampa Bay Buccaneers. Wilson played college football for the NC State Wolfpack.

== Early life ==
Wilson attended Lincolnton High School in Lincolnton, North Carolina. In 2007, he helped lead the Lincolnton football team to the NCHSAA 2A state championship title. In the state championship game, he rushed for 67 yards and two touchdowns, caught two passes for 41 yards and made five tackles.

== College career ==
Wilson played college football at NC State. During his career with the Wolfpack, he recorded 114 tackles, 4 interceptions and had 3 interceptions returned for touchdowns.

== Professional career ==
=== Chicago Bears ===
On April 28, 2013, Wilson signed with the Chicago Bears as an undrafted free agent. He was waived on October 28, 2013, but was brought back onto the practice squad.

=== Tampa Bay Buccaneers ===
Wilson signed with the Tampa Bay Buccaneers on September 8, 2014. On July 4, 2015, Wilson lost two fingers in a fireworks accident. Wilson's agent announced he was stepping away from football due to his injury on July 24, 2015.
