= Jamaal Johnson-Webb =

American football player (born 1990)

Profile
- Position: Offensive tackle

Personal information
- Born: March 6, 1990 (age 36); Atlanta, Georgia
- Listed height: 6 ft 6 in (1.98 m)
- Listed weight: 306 lb (139 kg)

Career information
- High school: Jonesboro (GA) Mundy's Mill
- College: Alabama A&M
- NFL draft: 2013: undrafted

Career history
- Arizona Cardinals (2013)*; Chicago Bears (2013)*; Minnesota Vikings (2013)*; Buffalo Bills (2013)*; New York Giants (2014)*
- * Offseason or practice squad member only

Career NFL statistics
- Games played: --
- Games started: --
- Fumble recoveries: --
- Stats at Pro Football Reference

Jamaal Johnson-Webb (born March 6, 1990) is an American former professional football offensive tackle of the National Football League (NFL) He played college football at Alabama A&M.

== Professional career ==
=== Arizona Cardinals ===
On April 27, 2013, he signed with the Arizona Cardinals as an undrafted free agent following the 2013 NFL draft.

=== Chicago Bears ===
On September 2, 2013, he signed with the Chicago Bears practice squad. He was released on September 24.

=== Minnesota Vikings ===
On November 13, 2013, he was signed to the practice squad of the Minnesota Vikings.

=== Buffalo Bills ===
On December 3, 2013, he was signed to the Buffalo Bills practice squad.

=== New York Giants ===
On May 14, 2014, he was claimed off waivers by the New York Giants.
