= 2012 Chicago Bears season =

American football league team season

- Owner: The McCaskey Family
- General manager: Phil Emery
- Head coach: Lovie Smith
- Home stadium: Soldier Field

Results
- Record: 10–6
- Division place: 3rd NFC North
- Playoffs: Did not qualify
- All-Pros: 4: WR Brandon Marshall (first team); CB Charles Tillman (first team); DE Julius Peppers (second team); CB Tim Jennings (second team)
- Pro Bowlers: 5: WR Brandon Marshall; DE Julius Peppers; DT Henry Melton; CB Charles Tillman; CB Tim Jennings

Uniform
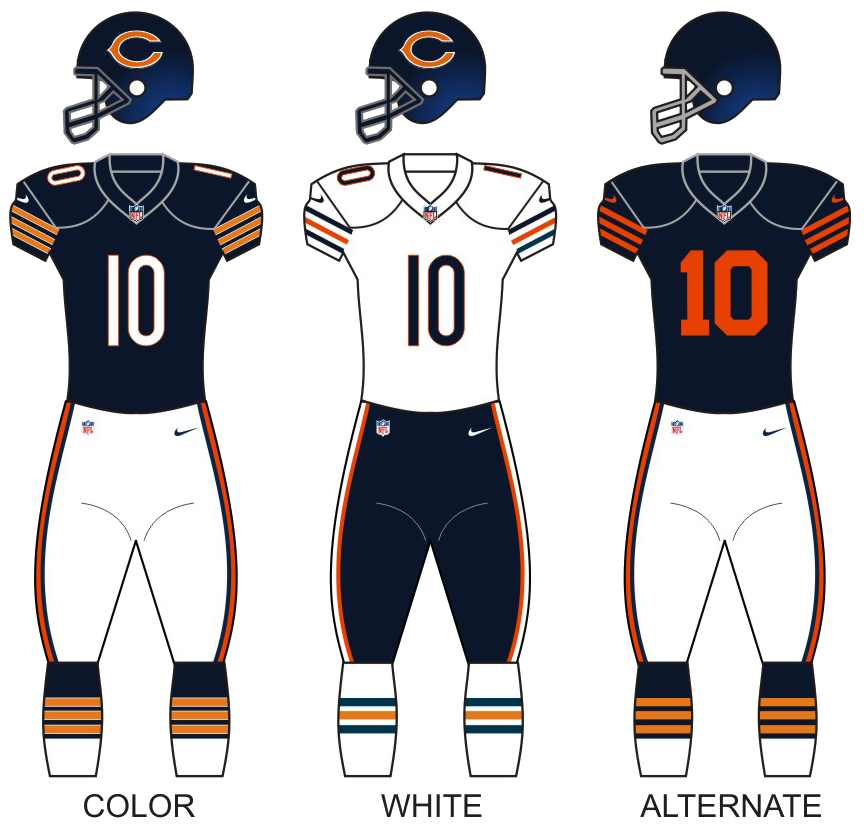

The 2012 season was the Chicago Bears' 93rd in the National Football League (NFL), as well as their ninth and final season under head coach Lovie Smith. The Bears played at Soldier Field for the 10th season since its reconstruction in 2001.

The Bears entered the 2012 season looking to improve on their 8–8 record in 2011. They acquired wide receiver Brandon Marshall from the Miami Dolphins, who had played with Bears Quarterback, Jay Cutler with the Denver Broncos from 2006 to 2008. The Bears were expected to be a wild card team by ten ESPN experts, and four NFL.com analysts predicted that the team would finish second in the NFC North. By the season's midpoint, the Bears had proven to be among the league's elite teams, having a record of 7–1 in their first eight games, something they had not accomplished since their 2006 Super Bowl season, along with a scoring differential of +120, which led the league. The team trailed the San Francisco 49ers in scoring defense with 15 points per game allowed, and third in scoring offense with 29.5, trailing the New England Patriots and Houston Texans. The defense also recorded six interceptions returned for touchdowns in the first seven games of the season, an NFL record; the Bears then recorded two more in the season, one shy of the record set by the 1961 San Diego Chargers. However, during the second half of the season, the Bears went 3–5, and after scoring 19 touchdowns in the first eight games, the Bears scored ten fewer in the second half of the season. Despite defeating the Detroit Lions in the season finale to have a record of 10–6, the Minnesota Vikings, who also had a record of 10–6, had a better division record than Chicago after they defeated the Green Bay Packers 37–34 the same week, thus earning the second wild-card spot and ending the Bears’ season. As a result, the Bears became the first team since the 1996 Washington Redskins to start the season 7–1 and miss the playoffs. On December 31, Smith was fired, and was replaced by Montreal Alouettes head coach Marc Trestman.

The Bears finished the season by leading the NFL in takeaways with 44, sixth in third-down efficiency (35.5 percent) and eighth in sacks with 41, while ranking third in the league in fewest points allowed with 277; Chicago was the lone team in the top five in that category to not qualify for the playoffs. The Bears also had a +20 turnover margin, second behind the New England Patriots; the Bears and New York Giants were the only teams in the top 11 of the category to not make the playoffs. This was the last winning season for the Bears until 2018.

== Offseason ==
=== Organizational changes ===
On January 3, the team fired eleven-year general manager Jerry Angelo. In the search for a new general manager, the Bears considered New York Giants director of college scouting Marc Ross, San Diego Chargers director of player personnel Jimmy Raye III, New England Patriots director of pro personnel Jason Licht, and Kansas City Chiefs director of college scouting Phil Emery, along with in-house candidate Tim Ruskell (Ruskell and the Bears would mutually part ways on January 30). The hunt later narrowed down to Emery and Licht, and Emery was ultimately chosen as the new general manager on January 28.

Offensive coordinator Mike Martz later resigned from his position, and on January 7, the Bears promoted offensive line coach Mike Tice to Martz's role. On January 8, Tim Holt was hired to take Tice's place. In the team's search for a new offensive coordinator/quarterbacks coach after Shane Day's resignation, they originally considered former Bears quarterback coach Greg Olson (though he later declined) and Alex Van Pelt. Tice had expressed interest in hiring Dirk Koetter, who worked with Tice in Jacksonville, though Koetter would later be hired by the Atlanta Falcons. The Bears eventually hired former Seattle Seahawks quarterbacks coach Jeremy Bates. The team also re-signed special-teams coordinator Dave Toub back on the team to a two-year extension; Toub had been among the candidates for the Miami Dolphins head coach position, but failed to get hired.

The Bears, after head athletic trainer Tim Bream left for Penn State, promoted former assistant athletic trainer Chris Hanks to Bream's role, as well as director of rehabilitation Bobby Slater to Hanks's role. The Bears' scouting team was expanded after hiring Chris Ballard as director of pro scouting, Marty Barrett as college scouting director, while adding seven new scouts and four scouting assistants. Among the new scouts is former Bears cornerback Dwayne Joseph, who was hired as a pro scout.

=== Roster changes ===
Chicago opened free agency with an NFC North-leading $24 million in cap space.

==== Acquisitions ====
The first transaction of 2012 was on January 6, when the Bears signed Donovan Warren, Reggie Stephens, and Draylen Ross to future/reserve contracts. On March 13, the first day of free agency, Chicago acquired wide receiver Brandon Marshall from the Miami Dolphins for two third round draft picks, along with Jason Campbell and Blake Costanzo. The following day, Eric Weems was signed, followed by Michael Bush eight days later. The final signing of March was New York Giants receiver Devin Thomas. On April 4, the Bears signed cornerbacks Kelvin Hayden and Jonathan Wilhite, and offensive guard Chilo Rachal on April 18. The following day saw Chicago signing Buccaneers linebacker Geno Hayes. The first signings of May occurred on May 10, when the Bears signed John McCargo, DeMario Pressley, and Cheta Ozougwu, and 13 days later, Nate Collins was signed. On June 15, the Bears signed Cornelius Brown and Cory Brandon. Two days later, Chicago signed Lorenzo Booker.

==== Departures ====
The first departures were on March 1, when the Bears released Anthony Adams and Frank Omiyale. Six days later, the Bears announced that they will not bring back quarterback Caleb Hanie, who was subsequently signed by the Denver Broncos. On March 23, the Bears lost Marion Barber to retirement, and unrestricted free agent Corey Graham to the Baltimore Ravens. Three days later, Zack Bowman was signed by the Minnesota Vikings, followed by Amobi Okoye to Tampa Bay on April 7. On April 19, the Bears released Max Komar, and Winston Venable was released on May 3. Eleven days later, Chicago waived Levi Horn, Reggie Stephens, and Andre Smith. On June 12, Donovan Warren was released, followed by Nathan Enderle and Mansfield Wrotto on June 14. On July 17, undrafted free agent Alvester Alexander was released.

=== 2012 draft class ===
In the first round, the Bears selected Boise State defensive end Shea McClellin with the 19th overall pick. Though McClellin played defensive end and linebacker at college, Bears general manager Phil Emery stated that McClellin will exclusively play defensive end with the Bears. In the second round, the Bears traded their second round pick (50th overall) and their fifth rounder (150th overall) to the St. Louis Rams in exchange for their second rounder (45th overall), which was used on South Carolina wide receiver Alshon Jeffery. Emery considered Jeffery one of the best receivers in the draft, placing him ahead of Justin Blackmon and Michael Floyd. In round three, the Bears drafted Oregon State safety Brandon Hardin 79th overall, despite missing the entire 2011 college football season with a shoulder injury. Hardin's selection marked the eighth consecutive year the team spent a draft pick on a safety. In the next round, the Bears selected Temple tight end Evan Rodriguez. Though he played tight end, he was envisioned as a fullback by the team, and was primarily intended to be a blocker. Rodriguez stated that he has been a blocker at Temple during Al Golden's tenure as offensive coordinator. The Bears closed out the draft by drafting two cornerbacks, Nevada's Isaiah Frey (184th overall) and TCU's Greg McCoy (220th overall), despite the team already having six cornerbacks. McCoy was sixth in the nation in kickoff return yards, having averaged 30.6 yards per return, and scoring two touchdowns. Draft analysts gave the Bears draft grades mainly C's. The entire draft class was signed by May 15.

**2012 Chicago Bears draft**
Round	Pick	Player	Position	College	Notes
1	19	Shea McClellin	Defensive end	Boise State	
2	45	Alshon Jeffery *	Wide receiver	South Carolina	From St. Louis Rams
3	79	Brandon Hardin	Safety	Oregon State	
5	111	Evan Rodriguez	Fullback/Tight end	Temple	
6	184	Isaiah Frey	Cornerback	Nevada	
7	220	Greg McCoy	Cornerback/Kick returner	TCU	
Made roster † Pro Football Hall of Fame * Made at least one Pro Bowl during career

Draft Day Trades
Round	Overall	Team	Received
2	50	to St. Louis Rams	St. Louis's second round pick (45th overall)
5	150	to St. Louis Rams	St. Louis's second round pick (45th overall)

=== Undrafted free agents ===
After the conclusion of the draft, the Bears announced coming to terms with eleven undrafted free-agents.

- Alvester Alexander, RB (Wyoming)
- James Brown, OT (Troy)
- Ronnie Cameron, DT (Old Dominion)
- Adrien Cole, LB (Louisiana Tech)
- Trevor Coston, S (Maine)
- Terriun Crump, WR (Western Illinois)
- Brittan Golden, WR (West Texas A&M)
- A. J. Greene, OT (Auburn)
- Jeremy Jones, S (Wayne State)
- Chris Summers, WR (Liberty)
- Ronnie Thornton, LB (Southern Mississippi)

=== Offseason workouts ===
==== Rookie minicamp ====
51 rookies worked out with the team at Rookie Minicamp, consisting of closed two-hour practices. The rookies included 6 draft picks, 11 undrafted free agents and 34 others.

Chicago Bears 2012 Rookie Mini-Camp Roster
**Quarterbacks**: 4 Matt Blanchard; 18 Ronnie Fouch; **Running backs**: 38 Alvester Alexander; 37 Embry Peeples; **Wide receivers**: 12 Joseph Anderson; 11 Willie Clark; 81 Terriun Crump; 82 Brittan Golden; 17 **Alshon Jeffery**; 19 David Mosley; 16 Keith Nichol; 83 Chris Summers	**Tight ends**: 88 **Evan Rodriguez**; 85 Brandon Venson; 86 Alejandro Villanueva; **Offensive linemen**: 78 James Brown; 64 Mike Garrity; 75 A. J. Greene; 76 Tyler Hendrickson; 70 Jarvis Jones; 52 Anthony Mihota; 68 Trevor Olson; 62 Nick Pieschel; **Defensive linemen**: 79 Ronnie Cameron; 76 Myles Caragein; 93 T. J. Greenstone; 70 Eli Joseph; 99 **Shea McClellin**; 68 Josue Ortiz; 94 Jason Peters; 97 Zary Stewart	**Linebackers**: 52 Josh Biezuns; 95 Adrien Cole; 58 Archie Donald; 62 Tyler Holmes; 64 Ronnie Thornton; 59 Youri Yenga; **Defensive backs**: 43 Trevor Coston S; 31 **Isaiah Frey** CB; 35 **Brandon Hardin** S; 46 Jeremy Jones S; 39 **Greg McCoy** CB; 48 Matthew Pearson S; 49 Brian Peters S	**Special teams**: 59 Brad Fortney LS; 1 Kevin Goessling K; 2 Ryan Quigley P; 14 David Teggart K; 10 Philip Welch K; 58 Kyle Wojta LS; Drafted players in bold Undrafted signees in italics 50 Total, 6 Drafted, 7 Signed, 37 Unsigned

==== OTA workouts ====
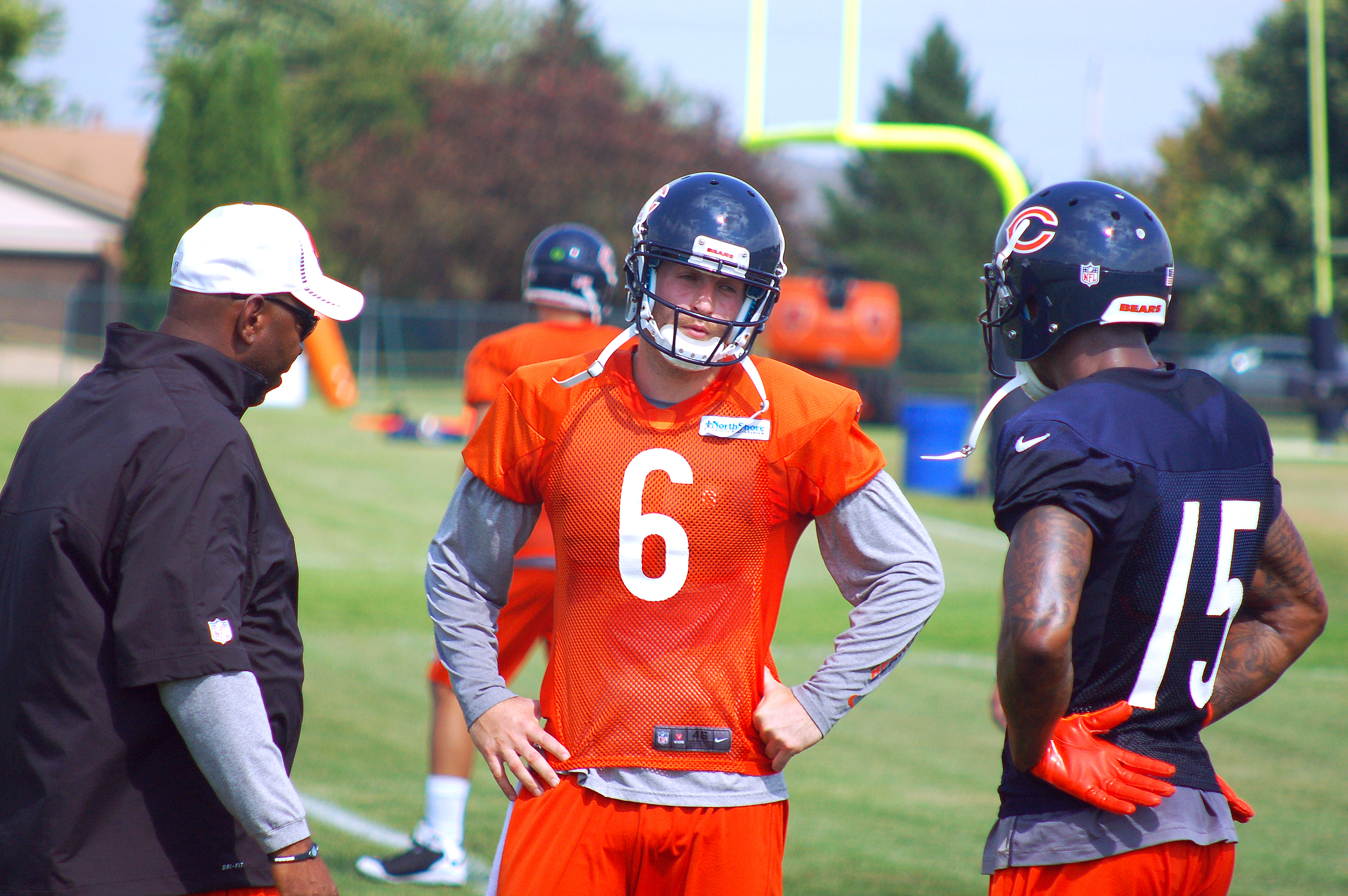
Quarterback Jay Cutler (center) talks with Brandon Marshall (right) during training camp

On May 22, the Bears began their organized team activity (OTA) workouts, with workouts being from May 29–31 and June 4–7, with a mandatory full squad workout in June. Under the new collective bargaining agreement between the league and the NFLPA, offseason programs will last 9 weeks, instead of the former 14 weeks, and will be in 3 phases. In the first phase, activities were limited to strength, conditioning, and physical rehabilitation, with only strength and conditioning coaches allowed on the field. Players cannot wear helmets, and footballs are limited to quarterbacks and their receivers. In the second phase, all coaches are allowed on the field, and players will perform 7-on-7 and 11-on-11 non-contact drills. In the third and final phase, players may wear helmets, but one-on-one drills involving the offense and defense are prohibited. Running back Matt Forté skipped the workouts due to a contract dispute. Middle linebacker Brian Urlacher, cornerback Charles Tillman, wide receiver Devin Hester and kicker Robbie Gould did not attend the workouts. Tight end Matt Spaeth, rookie receiver Alshon Jeffery, receiver Johnny Knox and cornerback Jonathan Wilhite were present, but did not participate. Julius Peppers held out of team drills, and Chauncey Davis was called to take first team reps at defensive end. Kyle Adams replaced Spaeth at tight end. Dom DeCicco and Nick Roach replaced Urlacher at linebacker. Patrick Mannelly also did not practice due to an injury.

==== Minicamp ====
During Bears minicamp, Matt Forte still held out, and remained unavailable. Forte had a July 16 deadline to agree to a long-term deal, and eventually signed it on the day of the deadline. Newcomer Michael Bush was called to take Forte's place before the signing.

=== Training Camp ===
The team held training camp at Olivet Nazarene University for the eleventh consecutive year, which ran from July 25 to August 17. The Bears held their annual Family Fest at Soldier Field on August 3 in front of a crowd of 27,352.

The first transaction of Training Camp occurred on July 26, when the Bears traded with the Buccaneers, with the Buccaneers sending Brian Price to Chicago in exchange for an undisclosed 2013 NFL draft pick. The last signing of July happened two days later, when Jeremy Ware was signed. The first acquisition of August was former Bears receiver Rashied Davis after Devin Thomas announced his retirement, and Derek Walker was signed the next day.

The first departure during Training Camp was David Teggart on July 28, and on August 5, Devin Thomas announced his retirement. The final two departures before preseason occurred on August 7, when the Bears released Tyler Hendrickson, and August 8, when Draylen Ross was released.

== Preseason ==
=== Transactions ===
Preseason roster changes

Additions

- On August 11, the Bears signed Xavier Adibi, K. C. Asiodu and Aston Whiteside.
- On August 20, the Bears signed Mark LeGree.
- On August 29, the Bears signed Terriun Crump.
- On August 31, the Bears acquired Sherrick McManis via trade for Tyler Clutts.
- On September 3, the Bears signed Amobi Okoye.

Departures

- On August 11, the Bears waived Jeremy Ware and Ronnie Cameron.
- On August 20, the Bears waived Ronnie Thornton.
- On August 23, the Bears waived Kahlil Bell.
- On August 25, the Bears waived Chris Summers and Derek Walker.
- On August 26, the Bears waived John McCargo, K. C. Asiodu, Matt Blanchard, Trevor Coston, Terriun Crump, and Thaddeus Gibson.
- On August 27, the Bears waived Harvey Unga.
- On August 29, the Bears waived Dom DeCicco.
- On August 31, the Bears traded away Tyler Clutts for Sherrick McManis.
- On August 31, the Bears waived Josh McCown, Joseph Anderson, Terriun Crump, Brittan Golden, Xavier Adibi, Chauncey Davis, James Brown, A. J. Greene, Cornelius Brown, Isaiah Frey, Greg McCoy, Ricky Henry, Mark LeGree, Jordan Miller, Brandon Venson, Aston Whiteside, and Jabara Williams.
- On September 3, the Bears waived Brian Price.

Practice squad additions

- On September 1, the Bears added Armando Allen, Joseph Anderson, Matt Blanchard, Cory Brandon, James Brown Isaiah Frey, Harvey Unga and Aston Whiteside to the practice squad.

Reserve list

- On August 26, the Bears placed Johnny Knox on the Physically Unable to Play (PUP) list and Brandon Hardin on IR.
- On August 31, the Bears placed Nate Collins on the reserve/suspended list.

=== Schedule ===
The Bears' preseason schedule was announced on April 4, 2012. The Bears took on the Broncos, Peyton Manning, and former Bear Caleb Hanie, playing in their first game as Broncos, a game the Bears lost 31–3. Though safety Major Wright was able to intercept Manning, and rookie Shea McClellin managed to sack Hanie in the first quarter, the team, playing without Jay Cutler, Matt Forte, Brian Urlacher, and Julius Peppers, the offense failed to convert any third down attempts, and only managed to get into Broncos territory once in the first half, which resulted in Josh McCown getting sacked. The defense also allowed Denver to convert 8 out of 16 third down conversions. In the second half, the Broncos scored three touchdowns on Xavier Omon's run, Brock Osweiler's pass to Jason Hill, and Adam Weber's pass to Cornelius Ingram. In the second game, the Bears faced rookie first-round draft pick Robert Griffin III and the Redskins, and forced Griffin to fumble. The Bears would lead 30–10, but Washington would take the lead in the fourth quarter after scoring 21 points on two Kirk Cousins passes and a Brandon Banks punt return, but Robbie Gould would tie the Bears record (that he himself set) for the longest field goal to give the Bears the victory. Against the defending champion New York Giants, though Cutler only completed 9 of 21 passes for 96 yards, he threw a 21-yard touchdown pass to Brandon Marshall, and Gould kicked two field goals. The Giants would go on to score two touchdowns in the second-quarter, and led 17–7, though the Bears would later regain the lead 20–17. Late in the fourth quarter, Bears rookie Isaiah Frey intercepted a David Carr pass that was tipped by Anthony Walters to give the Bears the victory. In the final preseason game against the Cleveland Browns, a frequent preseason opponent, the Bears took an early lead that they never relinquished for the rest of the game on two Josh McCown touchdown passes, an interception return by rookie Greg McCoy, and a blocked punt returned 22 yards for a touchdown by Brittan Golden, leading to a Bears 28–20 victory.

Week	Date	Opponent	Result	Record	Game site	NFL.com GameBook	NFL.com recap
1	August 9	Denver Broncos	L 3–31	0–1	Soldier Field	Gamebook	Recap
2	August 18	Washington Redskins	W 33–31	1–1	Soldier Field	Gamebook	Recap
3	August 24	at New York Giants	W 20–17	2–1	MetLife Stadium	Gamebook	Recap
4	August 30	at Cleveland Browns	W 28–20	3–1	Cleveland Browns Stadium	Gamebook	Recap

== Regular season ==
=== Transactions ===
Regular season roster changes

Additions

- On September 8, the Bears elevated Armando Allen to the 53-man roster from the practice squad.
- On September 10, the Bears signed Jonathan Scott.
- On September 15, the Bears signed Kahlil Bell.
- On October 15, the Bears signed Brody Eldridge.
- On October 16, the Bears signed Zack Bowman.
- On November 13, the Bears signed Josh McCown.
- On November 21, the Bears elevated James Brown to the 53-man roster from the practice squad.
- On November 27, the Bears signed Andre Gurode.
- On December 4, the Bears signed Dom DeCicco.
- On December 11, the Bears signed Olindo Mare and Jerry Franklin.
- On December 11, the Bears elevated Joseph Anderson to the 53-man roster from the practice squad.
- On December 12, the Bears signed Amobi Okoye.
- On December 17, the Bears elevated Cory Brandon to the 53-man roster from the practice squad.
- On December 18, the Bears signed Kahlil Bell.
- On December 26, the Bears signed Troy Nolan.
- On December 28, the Bears elevated Harvey Unga to the 53-man roster from the practice squad.

Departures

- On September 8, the Bears waived Patrick Trahan.
- On September 10, the Bears released Ryan Quigley.
- On September 14, the Bears lost Dedrick Epps to the New York Jets.
- On September 15, the Bears released Jeremy Jones.
- On September 18, the Bears released Lorenzo Booker.
- On October 9, the Bears waived Harvey Unga.
- On October 15, the Bears released Kahlil Bell.
- On October 16, the Bears released Chris Williams.
- On October 30, the Bears waived Joseph Anderson.
- On November 6, the Bears waived Kamar Aiken.
- On November 13, the Bears released Brody Eldridge.
- On November 21, Chilo Rachal left the Bears for personal reasons.
- On November 27, the Bears released Amobi Okoye, Raymond Radway, and Chris Riley.
- On December 4, the Bears released Patrick Trahan and Matt Blanchard.
- On December 11, the Bears released Andre Gurode.
- On December 24, the Bears released Dane Sanzenbacher.
- On December 28, the Bears released Cheta Ozougwu.

Miscellaneous

- On September 8, the Bears placed Lorenzo Booker on injured reserve.
- On November 22, the Bears placed Chilo Rachal on the reserve/non-football injury list.
- On November 26, the Bears placed Lance Louis on injured reserve.
- On December 11, the Bears placed Robbie Gould, Craig Steltz and Sherrick McManis on injured reserve.
- On December 17, the Bears placed Matt Toeaina on injured reserve.
- On December 18, the Bears placed Michael Bush on injured reserve.

Practice squad additions

- On September 10, the Bears added Dedrick Epps to the practice squad.
- On September 14, the Bears added Gabe Miller to the practice squad.
- On October 9, the Bears added Kamar Aiken to the practice squad.
- On October 17, the Bears added Cory Brandon to the practice squad.
- On October 30, the Bears added Raymond Radway to the practice squad.
- On November 6, the Bears added Joseph Anderson to the practice squad.
- On November 22, the Bears added Chris Riley to the practice squad.
- On November 27, the Bears added Derek Dennis and Dale Moss to the practice squad.
- On December 4, the Bears added Harvey Unga to the practice squad.
- On December 11, the Bears added Chris Riley to the practice squad.
- On December 19, the Bears added Reggie Stephens to the practice squad.

=== Schedule ===
The team's schedule was announced on April 17. Besides the team's divisional opponents, the Bears played the AFC South, NFC West, along with the Dallas Cowboys and Carolina Panthers. The team had the twentieth strongest schedule in the NFL, tied with the Detroit Lions, New York Jets, and Kansas City Chiefs with opponents having a combined record of 126–130 (.492) in 2011. The team captains for the season remained the same as the previous season; the Bears selected Jay Cutler, Roberto Garza, Patrick Mannelly, Julius Peppers and Brian Urlacher as captains.

Week	Date	Opponent	Result	Record	Game site	NFL.com GameBook	NFL.com recap
1	September 9	Indianapolis Colts	**W** 41–21	1–0	Soldier Field	Gamebook	Recap
2	September 13	at **Green Bay Packers**	**L** 10–23	1–1	Lambeau Field	Gamebook	Recap
3	September 23	St. Louis Rams	**W** 23–6	2–1	Soldier Field	Gamebook	Recap
4	October 1	at Dallas Cowboys	**W** 34–18	3–1	Cowboys Stadium	Gamebook	Recap
5	October 7	at Jacksonville Jaguars	**W** 41–3	4–1	EverBank Field	Gamebook	Recap
6	Bye						
7	October 22	**Detroit Lions**	**W** 13–7	5–1	Soldier Field	Gamebook	Recap
8	October 28	Carolina Panthers	**W** 23–22	6–1	Soldier Field	Gamebook	Recap
9	November 4	at Tennessee Titans	**W** 51–20	7–1	LP Field	Gamebook	Recap
10	November 11	Houston Texans	**L** 6–13	7–2	Soldier Field	Gamebook	Recap
11	November 19	at San Francisco 49ers	**L** 7–32	7–3	Candlestick Park	Gamebook	Recap
12	November 25	**Minnesota Vikings**	**W** 28–10	8–3	Soldier Field	Gamebook	Recap
13	December 2	Seattle Seahawks	**L** 17–23 (OT)	8–4	Soldier Field	Gamebook	Recap
14	December 9	at **Minnesota Vikings**	**L** 14–21	8–5	Mall of America Field	Gamebook	Recap
15	December 16	**Green Bay Packers**	**L** 13–21	8–6	Soldier Field	Gamebook	Recap
16	December 23	at Arizona Cardinals	**W** 28–13	9–6	University of Phoenix Stadium	Gamebook	Recap
17	December 30	at **Detroit Lions**	**W** 26–24	10–6	Ford Field	Gamebook	Recap
NOTE: Intra-division opponents are in **bold** text. LEGEND # Games played with color uniforms. (Note: The Bears announced their uniform combinations for the season and the dates in which they would wear their 1940s throwbacks. Rumors were also debunked of the "orange pants" combination the team dons in the Madden NFL 13 video game.) # Games played with white uniforms. # Games played with 1940s throwback uniforms. – Light green background indicates a victory. – Light red background indicates a loss.

=== Game summaries ===
==== Week 1: vs. Indianapolis Colts ====
Week One: Indianapolis Colts at Chicago Bears – Game summary

Quarter	1	2	3	4	Total
Colts	7	7	0	7	**21**
**Bears**	7	17	10	7	**41**

at Soldier Field, Chicago, Illinois

- Date: September 9
- Game time: 12:00 p.m. CDT
- Game weather: 69 °F (21 °C), partly cloudy
- Game attendance: 62,341
- Referee: Wayne Elliott (Note: Replacement officials used due to the ongoing referee labor dispute.)
- TV announcers (CBS): Greg Gumbel and Dan Dierdorf
- Gamebook

Game information

**First quarter**

- IND – Jerrell Freeman 4-yd interception return (A. Vinatieri kick, IND 0–7)
- CHI – Michael Bush 1-yd run (R. Gould kick, TIE 7–7)

**Second quarter**

- CHI – Brandon Marshall 3-yd pass from Jay Cutler (R. Gould kick, CHI 14–7)
- CHI – Robbie Gould 35-yd FG (CHI 17–7)
- IND – Donald Brown 18-yd run (A. Vinatieri kick, CHI 17–14)
- CHI – Michael Bush 1-yd run (R. Gould kick, CHI 24–14)

**Third quarter**

- CHI – Matt Forte 6-yd run (R. Gould kick, CHI 31–14)
- CHI – Robbie Gould 26-yd FG (CHI 34–14)

**Fourth quarter**

- IND – Donnie Avery 4-yd pass from Andrew Luck (A. Vinatieri kick, CHI 34–21)
- CHI – Alshon Jeffery 42-yd pass from Jay Cutler (R. Gould kick, CHI 41–21)

**Top passers**

- IND – Andrew Luck – 23/45, 309 yds, 1 TD, 3 INT
- CHI – Jay Cutler – 21/35, 333 yds, 2 TD, 1 INT

**Top rushers**

- IND – Donald Brown, 9 car, 48 yds, 1 TD
- CHI – Matt Forte, 16 car, 80 yds, 1 TD

**Top receivers**

- IND – Reggie Wayne, 9 rec, 135 yds
- CHI – Brandon Marshall, 9 rec, 119 yds, 1 TD

**Top tacklers**

- IND – Antoine Bethea, 9 tkls
- CHI – Major Wright, 6 tkls, 1 ast

The Bears opened the season against the Indianapolis Colts and first overall draft pick Andrew Luck at Soldier Field. The Bears opened the game on a sour note when Jay Cutler's pass to Matt Forte was intercepted by Jerrell Freeman and returned for a touchdown, giving the Colts a 7–0 lead. Cutler would only complete 30 percent of his passes (3 of 10) for 21 yards for a 4.9 passer rating. Despite this, in the second quarter, Cutler would complete 15 of 17 for 228 yards, one touchdown and a passer rating of 80.5, as the Bears would score twice on a Michael Bush 1-yard touchdown run and Brandon Marshall's 3-yard touchdown catch to give Chicago a 14–7 lead. The Bears defense was not able to sack Luck, but the Colts offense was only able to convert 1 of 4 third down attempts, and Tim Jennings was able to intercept Luck. In the third quarter, the Bears scored on a 6-yard rushing touchdown by Forte to increase the lead to 31–14. In the final quarter, Luck threw his first career touchdown to Donnie Avery to close the gap by 13 points, but the Bears would retaliate when Cutler threw a 42-yard touchdown pass to Alshon Jeffery. The Colts attempted to score, but Luck's pass would be intercepted by Jennings with less than two minutes left in the game.

With the win, the Bears opened the season with a 1–0 record. The 41 points scored by the Bears were the most in a season opener since the 1986 season, when the Bears defeated the Cleveland Browns 41–31, and is also the first time the Bears scored 41 points without a defensive/special teams touchdown since 1993.

==== Week 2: at Green Bay Packers ====
Week Two: Chicago Bears at Green Bay Packers – Game summary

Quarter	1	2	3	4	Total
Bears	0	0	3	7	**10**
**Packers**	0	13	0	10	**23**

at Lambeau Field, Green Bay, Wisconsin

- Date: September 13
- Game time: 7:20 p.m. CDT
- Game weather: 60 °F (16 °C), cloudy
- Game attendance: 70,543
- Referee: Gerald Wright
- TV announcers (NFLN): Brad Nessler, Mike Mayock and Alex Flanagan
- Gamebook

Game information

**First quarter**

**Second quarter**

- GB – Mason Crosby 48-yd FG (GB 0–3)
- GB – Tom Crabtree 27-yd pass from Tim Masthay (M. Crosby kick, GB 0–10)
- GB – Mason Crosby 35-yd FG (GB 0–13)

**Third quarter**

- CHI – Robbie Gould 45-yd FG (GB 3–13)

**Fourth quarter**

- GB – Mason Crosby 54-yd FG (GB 3–16)
- GB – Donald Driver 26-yd pass from Aaron Rodgers (M. Crosby kick, GB 3–23)
- CHI – Kellen Davis 21-yd pass from Jay Cutler (R. Gould kick, GB 10–23)

**Top passers**

- CHI – Jay Cutler – 11/27, 126 yds, 1 TD, 4 INT
- GB – Aaron Rodgers – 22/32, 219 yds, 1 TD, 1 INT

**Top rushers**

- CHI – Michael Bush – 14 car, 54 yds
- GB – Cedric Benson – 20 car, 81 yds

**Top receivers**

- CHI – Matt Forte – 4 rec, 49 yds
- GB – Jordy Nelson – 6 rec, 84 yds

**Top tacklers**

- CHI – Lance Briggs – 7 tkls, 3 ast
- GB – Morgan Burnett – 4 tkls, 2 ast

In a Thursday Night showdown against the rival Green Bay Packers, the Bears struggled throughout much of the game, and the offense was only able to muster one touchdown and 168 yards. Quarterback Jay Cutler was sacked seven times, and completed 11 of 27 passes for 126 yards with one touchdown, four interceptions and a 28.2 passer rating. Cutler's counterpart Aaron Rodgers was sacked five times, and ended the game by completing 22 of 32 passes for 219 yards and a touchdown, an interception and a passer rating of 85.3. In the first quarter, Packers kicker Mason Crosby opened the game with a field goal, and the Bears would fall behind even more when Packers holder Tim Masthay threw a pass to tight end Tom Crabtree on a fake field goal. In the third quarter, Matt Forte sustained an ankle injury (originally reported as a high ankle sprain), and was lost for the game. After Cutler was later intercepted by Tramon Williams, Bears linebacker Lance Briggs dropped a possible interception, as Green Bay later increased the lead on another field goal. The Bears would later score on a Robbie Gould field goal, but the Packers later scored ten points (a Crosby field goal and a Rodgers 26-yard touchdown pass to Donald Driver) in 21 seconds early in the fourth quarter. After Tim Jennings intercepted a Rodgers pass, Cutler connected with Kellen Davis to narrow the score to 23–10 with 6:49 left in the game, but the Packers would hold for the win.

The loss dropped the Bears to a 1–1 record.

==== Week 3: vs. St. Louis Rams ====
Week Three: St. Louis Rams at Chicago Bears – Game summary

Quarter	1	2	3	4	Total
Rams	0	3	3	0	**6**
**Bears**	3	7	0	13	**23**

at Soldier Field, Chicago, Illinois

- Date: September 23
- Game time: 12:00 p.m. CDT
- Game weather: 56 °F (13 °C), partly cloudy
- Game attendance: 62,224
- Referee: Jerry Hughes
- TV announcers (Fox): Dick Stockton, John Lynch and Jennifer Hale
- Gamebook

Game information

**First quarter**

- CHI – Robbie Gould 54-yd FG (CHI 3–0)

**Second quarter**

- CHI -Michael Bush 3-yd run (R. Gould, CHI 10–0)
- STL – Greg Zuerlein 56-yd FG (CHI 10–3)

**Third quarter**

- STL – Greg Zuerlein 46-yd FG (10–6)

**Fourth quarter**

- CHI – Robbie Gould 22-yd FG (CHI 13–6)
- CHI – Major Wright 45-yd interception return (R. Gould, CHI 20–6)
- CHI – Robbie Gould 37-yd FG (CHI 23–6)

**Top passers**

- STL – Sam Bradford – 18/35, 152 yds, 2 INT
- CHI – Jay Cutler – 17/31, 183 yds, 1 INT

**Top rushers**

- STL – Steven Jackson – 11 car, 29 yds
- CHI – Michael Bush – 18 car, 55 yds, 1 TD

**Top receivers**

- STL – Danny Amendola – 5 rec, 66 yds
- CHI – Brandon Marshall – 5 rec, 71 yds

**Top tacklers**

- STL – James Laurinaitis – 11 tkls
- CHI – Lance Briggs – 7 tkls

Attempting to bounce back from the Week 2 loss to the Packers, the Bears faced the St. Louis Rams. Throughout the course of the game, the Bears defense sacked Rams quarterback Sam Bradford six times, marking the first time the Bears defense has recorded at least five sacks in back-to-back games since the team's 2001 season. The six sacks increased the Bears season sack total to 14, which led the league, and is the most they have recorded in the first three games since 1987. On the offensive side, however, Jay Cutler completed only 17 of 31 passes for 183 yards and an interception (by Cortland Finnegan; Finnegan appeared to fumble on the return, and the ball was recovered by Bears receiver Devin Hester, but the fumble was overturned), and a mere passer rating of 58.9. With running back Matt Forte out for the game, the Bears rushing attack ran for 103 yards and Michael Bush ran for a 3-yard touchdown. In the second quarter, Rams kicker Greg Zuerlein kicked a 56-yard field goal, the longest in Soldier Field history. In the fourth quarter, Bears cornerback Tim Jennings deflected a Bradford pass intended for Danny Amendola to Major Wright, who returned the interception 45 yards for a touchdown.

The victory gave the Bears a 2–1 record.

==== Week 4: at Dallas Cowboys ====
Week Four: Chicago Bears at Dallas Cowboys – Game summary

Quarter	1	2	3	4	Total
**Bears**	0	10	14	10	**34**
Cowboys	0	7	3	8	**18**

at Cowboys Stadium, Arlington, Texas

- Date: October 1
- Game time: 7:30 p.m. CDT
- Game weather: 80 °F (27 °C), clear
- Game attendance: 90,080
- Referee: Walt Anderson
- TV announcers (ESPN): Mike Tirico, Jon Gruden and Lisa Salters
- Gamebook

Game information

**First quarter**

**Second quarter**

- CHI – Robbie Gould 43-yd FG (CHI 3–0)
- CHI – Charles Tillman 25-yd interception return (R. Gould kick, CHI 10–0)
- DAL – Miles Austin 10 yd-pass from Tony Romo (D. Bailey kick, CHI 10–7)

**Third quarter**

- CHI – Devin Hester 34 yd-pass from Jay Cutler (R. Gould, CHI 17–7)
- CHI – Lance Briggs 74 yd-interception return (R. Gould, CHI 24–7)
- DAL – Dan Bailey 39-yd FG (CHI 24–10)

**Fourth quarter**

- CHI – Brandon Marshall 31-yd pass from Jay Cutler (R. Gould kick, CHI 34–10)
- DAL – Jason Witten 5-yd pass from Kyle Orton (2 pt, CHI 34 – 18)

**Top passers**

- CHI – Jay Cutler – 18/24, 275 yds, 2 TD
- DAL – Tony Romo – 31/43, 307 yds, 1 TD, 5 INT

**Top rushers**

- CHI – Matt Forte – 13 car, 52 yds
- DAL – DeMarco Murray – 11 car, 24 yds

**Top receivers**

- CHI – Brandon Marshall – 7 rec, 138 yds, 1 TD
- DAL – Jason Witten – 13 rec, 112 yds, 1 TD

**Top tacklers**

- CHI – Chris Conte – 8 tkls, 3 ast
- DAL – Sean Lee – 10 tkls, 4 ast

In week 4, the Bears played against the Dallas Cowboys on Monday Night Football in Dallas. After a scoreless first quarter and Robbie Gould's field goal, Charles Tillman intercepted Tony Romo, returning the pick for a touchdown. The interception would be the first of Romo's five interceptions. Romo would later hit Miles Austin for a 10-yard touchdown. In the second half, Cutler was able to hit Devin Hester on a 34-yard touchdown pass to extend the Bears lead. Later, Romo's pass was intercepted by Bears linebacker Lance Briggs, who then returned the interception for a touchdown to increase the lead 24–7. The pick-six marked Bears' fourteenth forced turnover, which led the league, and also leads the league in interceptions (11). Cutler would then throw another touchdown pass to Brandon Marshall. Cutler would have his highest performance of the season, completing 18 of 24 passes for 275 yards, along with two touchdowns. His 140.1 passer rating was the third highest of his career. Marshall caught seven passes for 138 yards, a season-best. With 34 seconds left in the game, Romo was replaced by former Bears quarterback Kyle Orton, who threw a 5-yard touchdown pass to Jason Witten, and the Cowboys had a two-point conversion, but the Bears would then win 34–18.

With the win, the Bears shared the NFC North lead with the Minnesota Vikings with a 3–1 record.

==== Week 5: at Jacksonville Jaguars ====
Week Five: Chicago Bears at Jacksonville Jaguars – Game summary

Quarter	1	2	3	4	Total
**Bears**	3	0	10	28	**41**
Jaguars	0	3	0	0	**3**

at EverBank Field, Jacksonville, Florida

- Date: October 7
- Game time: 4:05 p.m. EDT/3:05 p.m. CDT
- Game weather: 88 °F (31 °C), cloudy
- Game attendance: 67,012
- Referee: Ron Winter
- TV announcers (Fox): Kenny Albert, Daryl Johnston and Tony Siragusa
- Gamebook

Game information

**First quarter**

- CHI – Robbie Gould 32-yd FG (CHI 3–0)

**Second quarter**

- JAC – Josh Scobee 31-yd FG (TIE 3–3)

**Third quarter**

- CHI – Robbie Gould 31-yd FG (CHI 6–3)
- CHI – Charles Tillman 36-yd interception return (R. Gould kick, CHI 13–3)

**Fourth quarter**

- CHI – Alshon Jeffery 10-yd pass from Jay Cutler (R. Gould kick, CHI 20–3)
- CHI – Brandon Marshall 24-yd pass from Jay Cutler (R. Gould kick, CHI 27–3)
- CHI – Lance Briggs 36-yd interception return (R. Gould kick, CHI 34–3)
- CHI – Armando Allen 46-yd run (R. Gould kick, CHI 41–3)

**Top passers**

- CHI – Jay Cutler – 23/39, 292 yds, 2 TD, 1 INT
- JAC – Blaine Gabbert – 17/33, 142 yds, 2 INT

**Top rushers**

- CHI – Matt Forte – 22 car, 107 yds
- JAC – Maurice Jones-Drew – 12 car, 56 yds

**Top receivers**

- CHI – Brandon Marshall – 12 rec, 144 yds, 1 TD
- JAC – Marcedes Lewis – 5 rec, 24 yds

**Top tacklers**

- CHI – Tim Jennings – 6 tkls
- JAC – Paul Posluszny – 8 tkls, 1 ast

In week 5, the Bears recorded the highest margin of victory of the season, defeating the Jacksonville Jaguars 41–3. In the first quarter, the Bears scored first on a Robbie Gould 32-yard field goal, though Jacksonville would respond in the next quarter on Josh Scobee's 31-yard kick. In the second half, the Bears broke the deadlock by kicking another field goal and cornerback Charles Tillman returning a Blaine Gabbert interception 36 yards for a touchdown, breaking former Bears safety Mike Brown's franchise record for the most pick-sixes in a career. Tillman also tied Donnell Woolford for the most interceptions by a cornerback in team history. In the fourth quarter, the Bears scored on Jay Cutler's 10-yard touchdown pass to Alshon Jeffery. Chicago would then extend their lead on Cutler's 24-yard pass to Brandon Marshall to increase the lead to 27–3. Bears linebacker Lance Briggs would then intercept Gabbert and score on a 36-yard return. Briggs and Tillman would become the first pair in league history to return interceptions for touchdowns in consecutive games, and the Bears became the first team in NFL history to return five interceptions for touchdowns in the first five games of a season. The Bears would close out the game with backup running back Armando Allen scoring on a 46-yard touchdown run.

The victory improved the team's record to 4–1. The victory is the most lopsided win for the Bears since their 1985 44–0 victory over the Cowboys, and the 38 points scored in the second half are the most since the team scoring 49 second half points in the 1941 win over the Philadelphia Eagles.

==== Week 7: vs. Detroit Lions ====
Week Seven: Detroit Lions at Chicago Bears – Game summary

Quarter	1	2	3	4	Total
Lions	0	0	0	7	**7**
**Bears**	10	0	3	0	**13**

at Soldier Field, Chicago, Illinois

- Date: October 22
- Game time: 7:30 p.m. CDT
- Game weather: 63 °F (17 °C), cloudy
- Game attendance: 62,300
- Referee: Alberto Riveron
- TV announcers (ESPN): Mike Tirico, Jon Gruden and Lisa Salters
- Gamebook

Game information

**First quarter**

- CHI – Brandon Marshall 7-yd pass from Jay Cutler (R. Gould kick, CHI 7–0)
- CHI – Robbie Gould 39-yd FG (CHI 10–0)

**Second quarter**

**Third quarter**

- CHI – Robbie Gould 21-yd FG (CHI 13–0)

**Fourth quarter**

- DET – Ryan Broyles 12-yd pass from Matthew Stafford (J. Hanson kick, CHI 13–7)

**Top passers**

- DET – Matthew Stafford – 28/46, 261 yds, 1 TD, 1 INT
- CHI – Jay Cutler – 16/31, 150 yds, 1 TD

**Top rushers**

- DET – Mikel Leshoure – 12 car, 63 yds
- CHI – Matt Forte – 22 car, 96 yds

**Top receivers**

- DET – Titus Young – 6 rec, 81 yds
- CHI – Brandon Marshall – 6 rec, 81 yds, 1 TD

**Top tacklers**

- DET – Amari Spievey – 6 tkls, 2 ast
- CHI – Tim Jennings – 7 tkls, 2 ast

Coming off a bye week, the Bears battled rival Detroit Lions on Monday Night Football. The team kept the Lions from scoring until the fourth quarter, and forced four takeaways. The first turnover forced was in the first half, when Lance Briggs stripped the ball from Mikel Leshoure, which was recovered by Julius Peppers. The second and third turnovers were forced in the third quarter on Zack Bowman's muffed punt recovery, and Brian Urlacher recovering Joique Bell's fumble. The final turnover occurred when Lions quarterback Matthew Stafford's pass was intercepted by D. J. Moore. The Bears struck first on Jay Cutler's touchdown pass to Brandon Marshall, and Robbie Gould kicked a field goal to increase the first half score to 10–0. During the game, Lions defensive tackle Ndamukong Suh threw Cutler to the ground, injuring his ribs. Cutler was eventually replaced by Jason Campbell for a play, before returning to the game. In the second half, Gould kicked another field goal, and prevented the Lions from scoring until the final 36 seconds of the game, when Stafford threw a 12-yard touchdown pass to Ryan Broyles to narrow the margin to six points, but the Bears sealed the victory by recovering the ensuring onside kick.

The victory increased the team's record to 5–1.

==== Week 8: vs. Carolina Panthers ====
Week Eight: Carolina Panthers at Chicago Bears – Game summary

Quarter	1	2	3	4	Total
Panthers	3	10	6	3	**22**
**Bears**	7	0	0	16	**23**

at Soldier Field, Chicago, Illinois

- Date: October 28
- Game time: 12:00 p.m. CDT
- Game weather: 49 °F (9 °C), cloudy – wind gusts to 25mph
- Game attendance: 62,254
- Referee: Ed Hochuli
- TV announcers (Fox): Kenny Albert, Daryl Johnston and Tony Siragusa
- Gamebook

Game information

**First quarter**

- CHI – Matt Forte 13-yd run (R. Gould kick, CHI 7–0)
- CAR – Justin Medlock 34-yd FG (CHI 7–3)

**Second quarter**

- CAR – Louis Murphy fumble recovery in end zone (J. Medlock kick, CAR 7–10)
- CAR – Justin Medlock 31-yd FG (CAR 7–13)

**Third quarter**

- CAR – Justin Medlock 22-yd FG (CAR 7–16)
- CAR – Justin Medlock 43-yd FG (CAR 7–19)

**Fourth quarter**

- CHI – Kellen Davis 12-yd pass from Jay Cutler (R. Gould kick, CAR 14–19)
- CHI – Tim Jennings 25-yd interception return (2pt conversion failed, CHI 20–19)
- CAR – Justin Medlock 45-yd FG (CAR 20–22)
- CHI – Robbie Gould 41-yd FG (CHI 23–22)

**Top passers**

- CAR – Cam Newton – 20/39, 314 yds, 2 INT
- CHI – Jay Cutler – 19/28, 186 yds, 1 TD, 1 INT

**Top rushers**

- CAR – Jonathan Stewart – 17 car, 42 yds
- CHI – Matt Forte – 15 car, 70 yds

**Top receivers**

- CAR – Steve Smith – 7 rec, 118 yds
- CHI – Brandon Marshall – 9 rec, 98 yds

**Top tacklers**

- CAR – Luke Kuechly – 8 tkls, 3 ast
- CHI – Tim Jennings – 8 tkls

In Week 8, the Bears donned their 1940s throwback uniforms against the Carolina Panthers, who had the worst record in the NFC. The Bears scored first on Matt Forte's 13-yard touchdown run, which would be countered by Justin Medlock's 34-yard field goal. The Panthers then took the lead on Louis Murphy's fumble recovery; Panthers quarterback Cam Newton ran with the ball, and lost the ball when Bears safety Major Wright tackled him at the 1-yard line. The ball rolled into the endzone, where Murphy recovered it. Medlock would then kick three more field goals, and by the fourth quarter, the Panthers led 19–7. The tide eventually turned when Panthers punter Brad Nortman shanked a 6-yard punt, and Jay Cutler hit Kellen Davis on a 12-yard touchdown pass with less than seven minutes left in the game. On the first play of the Panthers' next drive, Tim Jennings intercepted Newton and returned the pick 25 yards to regain the lead 20–19, after Cutler's two-point conversion passing attempt was intercepted. Medlock later kicked another field goal to reclaim the lead 22–20 with 2:27 left in the game. Cutler would lead the Bears downfield, and Gould kicked a 41-yard field goal as time expired to give Chicago the victory. The kick was Gould's tenth game-winning field goal, and the first since 2010.

The win gave Chicago a 6–1 record.

==== Week 9: at Tennessee Titans ====
Week Nine: Chicago Bears at Tennessee Titans – Game summary

Quarter	1	2	3	4	Total
**Bears**	28	3	6	14	**51**
Titans	2	3	7	8	**20**

at LP Field, Nashville, Tennessee

- Date: November 4
- Game time: 12:00 p.m. CST
- Game weather: 50 °F (10 °C), sunny
- Game attendance: 69,143
- Referee: Terry McAulay
- TV announcers (Fox): Thom Brennaman, Brian Billick and Laura Okmin
- Gamebook

Game information

**First quarter**

- CHI – Corey Wootton 5-yd blocked punt return (R. Gould kick, CHI 7–0)
- TEN – Penalty on J'Marcus Webb in endzone for safety (CHI 7–2)
- CHI – Matt Forte 8-yd run (R. Gould kick, CHI 14–2)
- CHI – Brian Urlacher 46-yd interception return (R. Gould kick, CHI 21–2)
- CHI – Brandon Marshall 13-yd pass from Jay Cutler (R. Gould kick, CHI 28–2)

**Second quarter**

- CHI – Robbie Gould 40-yd FG (CHI 31–2)
- TEN – Rob Bironas 39-yd FG (CHI 31–5)

**Third quarter**

- TEN – Nate Washington 30-yd pass from Matt Hasselbeck (R. Bironas kick, CHI 31–12)
- CHI – Robbie Gould 25-yd FG (CHI 34–12)
- CHI – Robbie Gould 22-yd FG (CHI 37–12)

**Fourth quarter**

- CHI – Brandon Marshall 39-yd pass from Jay Cutler (R. Gould kick, CHI 44–12)
- CHI – Brandon Marshall 5-yd pass from Jay Cutler (R. Gould kick, CHI 51–12)
- TEN – Chris Johnson 80-yd run (2 pt, CHI 51–20)

**Top passers**

- CHI – Jay Cutler – 19/26, 229 yds, 3 TD
- TEN – Matt Hasselbeck – 20/35, 200 yds, 1 TD, 1 INT

**Top rushers**

- CHI – Matt Forte – 12 car, 103 yds, 1 TD
- TEN – Chris Johnson – 16 car, 141 yds, 1 TD

**Top receivers**

- CHI – Brandon Marshall – 9 rec, 122 yds, 3 TD
- TEN – Kenny Britt – 5 rec, 67 yds

**Top tacklers**

- CHI – Charles Tillman – 9 tkls
- TEN – Zach Brown – 7 tkls, 3 ast

Against the Tennessee Titans, the Bears recorded a franchise record 28 points in the first quarter. The Bears defense recorded five turnovers; Charles Tillman recorded four forced fumbles by stripping Kenny Britt and Jared Cook once, and Chris Johnson twice (a league first), while Brian Urlacher recorded an interception. The Bears scored the first touchdown of the game when Sherrick McManis blocked Brett Kern's punt, which was recovered by Corey Wootton, who returned the blocked punt five yards for his first career touchdown. The Titans later recorded a safety when J'Marcus Webb was penalized for illegal-hands-to-the-face while blocking in the end zone. The Bears then scored on Matt Forte's eight-yard run, followed by Urlacher intercepting Matt Hasselbeck and returning the pick for another touchdown. Jay Cutler later hit Brandon Marshall to end the quarter with the Bears leading 28–2. The Bears became the first team in league history to score a touchdown pass, a touchdown run, an interception returned for a touchdown, and a kick/punt blocked for a score in a quarter. Titans kicker Rob Bironas later ended the half on a 39-yard field goal. The Titans would finally score a touchdown on Hasselbeck's 30-yard touchdown pass to Nate Washington in the third quarter. After Robbie Gould's three field goals, the Bears scored two more touchdowns on Cutler's passes to Marshall. With ten minutes left in the game, Johnson scored on an 80-yard run to narrow the score to 51–20, but the game would still be out of reach for the Titans.

With the win, the Bears improved to 7–1. The 51 points scored by the Bears were the most by the team since the 1980 victory over the Green Bay Packers, when the team triumphed 61–7. The points scored were also the highest by the Bears in a road game since their 1963 win over the Los Angeles Rams by a score of 52–14. In addition, Urlacher was named the NFC Defensive Player of the Week while McManis was named the NFC Special Teams Player of the Week. It was the first time teammates have won weekly awards since 2008.

==== Week 10: vs. Houston Texans ====
Week Ten: Houston Texans at Chicago Bears – Game summary

Quarter	1	2	3	4	Total
**Texans**	3	7	0	3	**13**
Bears	0	3	3	0	**6**

at Soldier Field, Chicago, Illinois

- Date: November 11
- Game time: 7:20 p.m. CST
- Game weather: 54 °F (12 °C), rain
- Game attendance: 62,410
- Referee: Gene Steratore
- TV announcers (NBC): Al Michaels, Cris Collinsworth and Michele Tafoya
- Gamebook

Game information

**First quarter**

- Shayne Graham 20-yd FG (HOU 0–3)

**Second quarter**

- Robbie Gould 51-yd FG (TIE 3–3)
- Arian Foster 2-yd pass from Matt Schaub (S. Graham kick, HOU 3–10)

**Third quarter**

- Robbie Gould 24-yd FG (HOU 6–10)

**Fourth quarter**

- Shayne Graham 42-yd FG (HOU 6–13)

**Top passers**

- HOU – Matt Schaub – 14/26, 95 yds, 1 TD
- CHI – Jason Campbell – 11/19, 94 yds

**Top rushers**

- HOU – Arian Foster – 29 car, 102 yds
- CHI – Matt Forte – 16 car, 39 yds

**Top receivers**

- HOU – Arian Foster – 5 rec, 15 yds, 1 TD
- CHI – Brandon Marshall – 8 rec, 107 yds

**Top tacklers**

- HOU – Tim Dobbins – 5 tkls, 2 ast
- CHI – Brian Urlacher – 7 tkls, 1 ast

In a game that various analysts considered a potential Super Bowl XLVII preview, the 7–1 Bears faced the also 7–1 Houston Texans on Sunday Night Football, in a game waged in the rain. The first half proved disastrous for Chicago, as Kellen Davis had the ball stripped by former Bear Danieal Manning, and recovered by Texans linebacker Tim Dobbins. Shayne Graham later kicked a 20-yard field goal to give Houston the first points of the game. On Chicago's next possession, Michael Bush fumbled, and the Texans recovered again. The Texans drive wouldn't last long, as Tim Jennings would intercept Matt Schaub. However, the Bears failed to take advantage of the turnover, as Jay Cutler's pass would get intercepted by Manning. A quarter later, Jennings once again intercepted Schaub, which set up a Robbie Gould 51-yard field goal. Later in the quarter, Justin Forsett broke a 25-yard run to the Bears 3-yard line, which set up Arian Foster's 2-yard touchdown catch. Late in the first half, Cutler was hit by Dobbins, giving him a concussion, which sidelined him for the rest of the game, and was replaced by Jason Campbell. With less than two minutes left in the third quarter, Gould hit a 24-yard field goal to draw the Bears within four points, but Graham would make a 42-yarder to increase the deficit to seven with less than five minutes left in the game. Gould had attempted a 48-yard field goal earlier in the fourth quarter, but the ball hit the left upright.

The loss snapped Chicago's six-game winning streak, the longest since their seven-game streak in 2006, and dropped Chicago to a 7–2 record, and 0–3 all-time against the Texans.

==== Week 11: at San Francisco 49ers ====
Week Eleven: Chicago Bears at San Francisco 49ers – Game summary

Quarter	1	2	3	4	Total
Bears	0	0	7	0	**7**
**49ers**	10	10	7	5	**32**

at Candlestick Park, San Francisco, California

- Date: November 19
- Game time: 7:30 p.m. CST/5:30 p.m. PST
- Game weather: 64 °F (18 °C), cloudy
- Game attendance: 69,732
- Referee: Tony Corrente
- TV announcers (ESPN): Mike Tirico, Jon Gruden and Lisa Salters
- Gamebook

Game information

**First quarter**

- SF – David Akers 32-yd FG (SF 0–3)
- SF – Vernon Davis 3-yd pass from Colin Kaepernick (D. Akers kick, SF 0–10)

**Second quarter**

- SF – Kendall Hunter 14-yd run (D. Akers kick, SF 0–17)
- SF – David Akers 37-yd FG (SF 0–20)

**Third quarter**

- SF – Michael Crabtree 10-yd pass from Colin Kaepernick (D. Akers kick, SF 0–27)
- CHI – Brandon Marshall 13-yd pass from Jason Campbell (R. Gould kick, SF 7–27)

**Fourth quarter**

- SF – David Akers 32-yd FG (SF 7–30)
- SF – Chilo Rachal tackled in endzone (SF 7–32)

**Top passers**

- CHI – Jason Campbell – 14/22, 107 yds, 1 TD, 2 INT
- SF – Colin Kaepernick – 16/23, 243 yds, 2 TD

**Top rushers**

- CHI – Matt Forte – 21 car, 63 yds
- SF – Frank Gore – 17 car, 78 yds

**Top receivers**

- CHI – Devin Hester – 3 rec, 23 yds
- SF – Vernon Davis – 6 rec, 83 yds, 1 TD

**Top tacklers**

- CHI – Major Wright – 8 tkls
- SF – NaVorro Bowman – 11 tkls, 1 ast

The Bears faced off on Monday night against the San Francisco 49ers in a battle of backup quarterbacks between Jason Campbell and Colin Kaepernick after Jay Cutler and Alex Smith were lost for the game due to concussions. With Campbell and Kaepernick making their first starts of the 2012 season, the game marked the first time two quarterbacks made their first starts of the season on Monday Night Football in a non-strike season (besides Week 1) since 1979 between Los Angeles Rams and Atlanta Falcons quarterbacks Vince Ferragamo and June Jones in Week 12. In Kaepernick's first career start, he completed 16 of 23 passes for 243 yards with two touchdowns and a 133.1 rating, while Campbell struggled, completing 14 of 22 passes for 107 yards with one touchdown, two interceptions and a 52.7 passer rating. Campbell was also sacked six times, including 5.5 times by Aldon Smith, the most by an individual on Chicago's opposing team. After David Akers made a 32-yard field goal, and the Bears went three-and-out, Kaepernick completed a 57-yard touchdown pass to Kyle Williams to give the 49ers a 10–0 lead in the first quarter. In the second quarter, 49ers running back Kendall Hunter scored on a 14-yard run, followed by Akers' 37-yard field goal. In the second half, the 49ers continued their dominance, with Kaepernick hitting Michael Crabtree on a 10-yard touchdown pass, which was countered by Campbell hitting Brandon Marshall on a 13-yard pass. In the final quarter, Akers hit a 32-yard field goal, and San Francisco recorded a safety when Campbell fumbled while getting sacked, with the ball being recovered by Bears offensive lineman Chilo Rachal in the endzone, making the final score 32–7.

The loss dropped Chicago to a 7–3 record, tying them with the Packers for the division lead. The loss was the eighth consecutive loss at Candlestick Park since 1985.

==== Week 12: vs. Minnesota Vikings ====
Week Twelve: Minnesota Vikings at Chicago Bears – Game summary

Quarter	1	2	3	4	Total
Vikings	3	0	7	0	**10**
**Bears**	10	15	3	0	**28**

at Soldier Field, Chicago, Illinois

- Date: November 25
- Game time: 12:00 p.m. CST
- Game weather: 41 °F (5 °C), partly cloudy
- Game attendance: 62,306
- Referee: Scott Green
- TV announcers (Fox): Kenny Albert, Daryl Johnston and Tony Siragusa
- Gamebook

Game information

**First quarter**

- MIN – Blair Walsh 40-yd FG (MIN 0–3)
- CHI – Michael Bush 1-yd run (R. Gould kick, CHI 7–3)
- CHI – Robbie Gould 47-yd FG (CHI 10–3)

**Second quarter**

- CHI – Michael Bush 1-yd run (2 pt, CHI 18–3)
- CHI – Matt Spaeth 13-yd pass from Jay Cutler (R. Gould kick, CHI 25–3)

**Third quarter**

- MIN – Kyle Rudolph 2-yd pass from Christian Ponder (B. Walsh kick, CHI 25–10)
- CHI – Robbie Gould 46-yd FG (CHI 28–10)

**Fourth quarter**

**Top passers**

- MIN – Christian Ponder – 22/43, 159 yds, 1 TD, 1 INT
- CHI – Jay Cutler – 23/31, 188 yds, 1 TD, 1 INT

**Top rushers**

- MIN – Adrian Peterson – 18 car, 108 yds
- CHI – Michael Bush – 21 car, 60 yds, 2 TD

**Top receivers**

- MIN – Jarius Wright – 7 rec, 49 yds
- CHI – Brandon Marshall – 12 rec, 92 yds

**Top tacklers**

- MIN – Erin Henderson – 8 tkls, 1 ast
- CHI – Nick Roach – 6 tkls, 1 ast

The Bears fought their rival Minnesota Vikings in Week 12. The game was an injury-laden game for both teams, with a total of seven players lost for both teams, with Chicago losing five (Lance Louis [knee], Chris Spencer [knee], Matt Forte [ankle], Devin Hester [concussion], and Charles Tillman [ankle]), while Minnesota lost Kyle Rudolph and Harrison Smith to concussions. The Bears first offensive play resulted in Matt Forte fumbling for the first time all season when he ran into Evan Rodriguez, and had the ball recovered by Vikings linebacker Chad Greenway. The Vikings then scored on Blair Walsh's 40-yard field goal. The Bears then struck back when Nick Roach stripped the ball from Adrian Peterson, which was recovered by Tillman. Jay Cutler, returning from the concussion he sustained two weeks prior, moved the ball downfield to the Vikings one-yard line, where Michael Bush ran in to give the Bears the lead. The Bears closed out the quarter with a 10–3 lead after Gould kicked a 47-yard field goal. In the second quarter, the Bears scored again on Bush's second one-yard touchdown run. On the ensuing extra point, holder Adam Podlesh faked the kick and ran in to give the Bears two points. Chris Conte would eventually intercept Christian Ponder at the 48-yard line and return the interception 35 yards to the Vikings 13-yard line. Cutler then hit Matt Spaeth in the left corner of the end zone to increase the score to 25–3. Early in the second half, Minnesota would record their first touchdown of the game on Ponder's two-yard pass to Rudolph, and Gould would then make a 46-yard field goal late in the third quarter to end the game with a Chicago victory.

In his return, Cutler completed 15 of 17 passes for 117 yards with one touchdown and a 115.0 passer rating in the first half, and would end the game with stats of 23 of 31 passes completed for 188 yards with one touchdown, one interception and an 86.5 passer rating. Receiver Brandon Marshall recorded 12 catches for 92 yards, and passed the 1,000 yards receiving mark for the sixth time in his career with 1,017 yards, making him the first Bears receiver to record 1,000 yards in a season since Marty Booker in 2002.

With the win, Chicago improved to 8–3, snapping their two-game losing streak.

==== Week 13: vs. Seattle Seahawks ====
Week Thirteen: Seattle Seahawks at Chicago Bears – Game summary

Quarter	1	2	3	4	OT	Total
**Seahawks**	0	10	0	7	6	**23**
Bears	7	0	7	3	0	**17**

at Soldier Field, Chicago, Illinois

- Date: December 2
- Game time: 12:00 p.m. CST
- Game weather: 61 °F (16 °C), cloudy
- Game attendance: 60,103
- Referee: Mike Carey
- TV announcers (Fox): Chris Myers, Tim Ryan and Jaime Maggio
- Gamebook

Game information

**First quarter**

- CHI – Earl Bennett 12-yd pass from Jay Cutler (R. Gould kick, CHI 7–0)

**Second quarter**

- SEA – Marshawn Lynch 4-yd run (S. Hauschka kick, TIE 7–7)
- SEA – Steven Hauschka 31-yd FG (SEA 7–10)

**Third quarter**

- CHI – Matt Forte 12-yd pass from Jay Cutler (R. Gould kick, CHI 14–10)

**Fourth quarter**

- SEA – Golden Tate 14-yd pass from Russell Wilson (S. Hauschka kick, SEA 14–17)
- CHI – Robbie Gould 46-yd FG (TIE 17–17)

**Overtime**

- SEA – Sidney Rice 13-yd pass from Russell Wilson (SEA 17–23)

**Top passers**

- SEA – Russell Wilson – 23/37, 293 yds, 2 TD
- CHI – Jay Cutler – 17/26, 233 yds, 2 TD

**Top rushers**

- SEA – Marshawn Lynch – 19 car, 87 yds, 1 TD
- CHI – Matt Forte – 21 car, 66 yds

**Top receivers**

- SEA – Sidney Rice – 6 rec, 99 yds
- CHI – Brandon Marshall – 10 rec, 165 yds

**Top tacklers**

- SEA – Bobby Wagner – 9 tkls, 2 ast
- CHI – Charles Tillman – 8 tkls, 1 ast, 1 FF

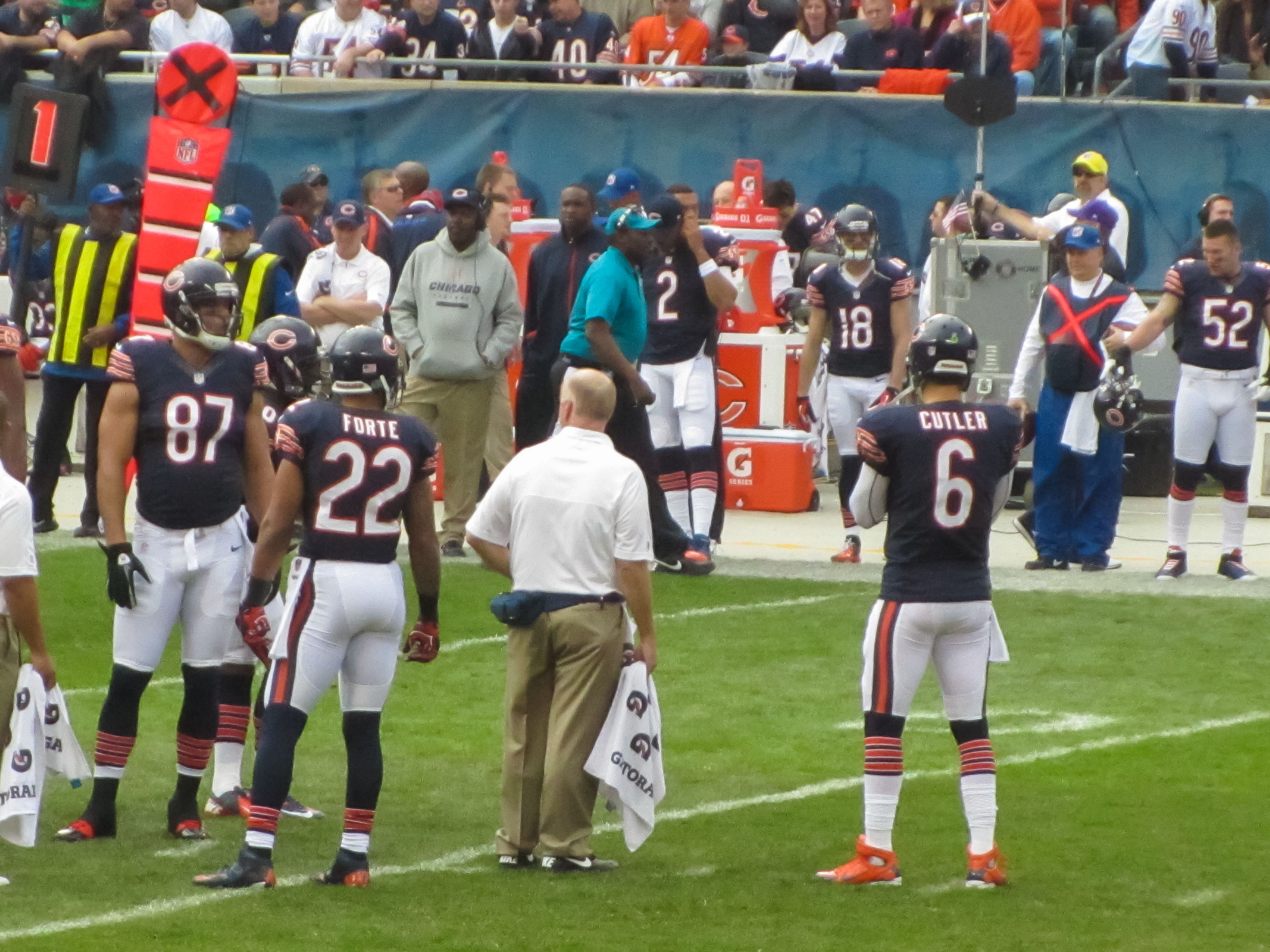
The Bears offense during a TV timeout

The Bears hosted the 6–5 Seattle Seahawks in Week 13, who had lost five of their first six road games. The Bears started the game strong, with Brian Urlacher forcing Marshawn Lynch to fumble, and the ball was recovered by Kelvin Hayden, and Jay Cutler eventually hit Earl Bennett on a 12-yard touchdown pass. The Bears would later fail twice to expand their lead; first, Lovie Smith called for Michael Bush to run up the middle on fourth-and-one at the Seattle 15, and he was stopped for no gain. On the second occasion, Bennett dropped a potential 62-yard touchdown pass. The Seahawks capitalized on the two blunders, with rookie quarterback Russell Wilson hitting Golden Tate on a 49-yard pass, and eventually scored on Lynch's 4-yard touchdown run. Wilson would complete 23 of 37 passes for 293 yards with two touchdowns and a 104.9 passer rating while rushing for 71 yards on nine carries. Seattle then took the lead on Steven Hauschka's 31-yard field goal to close the half. Seattle would have scored a touchdown on the previous play, but Braylon Edwards dropped the potential 10-yard touchdown pass in the end zone. In the third quarter, Chicago regained the lead on Cutler's 12-yard touchdown pass to Matt Forte, but Wilson would lead the Seahawks 97 yards to take back the lead on a touchdown pass to Tate. Cutler would then hit Brandon Marshall on a 56-yard pass to set up Robbie Gould's game-tying 46-yard field goal. In overtime, the Seahawks won the toss, and Wilson took the offense 80 yards, and threw the game-winning touchdown pass to Sidney Rice. On the play, Major Wright hit Rice while he was catching the ball, appearing to knock Rice unconscious and the ball out of his hands, but the review upheld the touchdown, giving Seattle the victory.

The loss dropped Chicago down to 8–4, once again tying them with the Packers for the NFC North lead. The 459 yards allowed are the most by the team all season.

This would mark Urlacher's final game in a Bears' uniform. Urlacher was inactive for the final four games of the 2012 season, and he retired from the NFL on May 22, 2013.

==== Week 14: at Minnesota Vikings ====
Week Fourteen: Chicago Bears at Minnesota Vikings – Game summary

Quarter	1	2	3	4	Total
Bears	0	7	0	7	**14**
**Vikings**	14	0	7	0	**21**

at Mall of America Field, Minneapolis, Minnesota

- Date: December 9
- Game time: 12:00 p.m. CST
- Game weather: Played indoors (dome stadium)
- Game attendance: 64,134
- Referee: Walt Coleman
- TV announcers (Fox): Kenny Albert, Daryl Johnston and Tony Siragusa
- Gamebook

Game information

**First quarter**

- MIN – Adrian Peterson 1-yd run (B. Walsh kick, MIN 0–7)
- MIN – Adrian Peterson 1-yd run (B. Walsh kick, MIN 0–14)

**Second quarter**

- CHI – Alshon Jeffery 23-yd pass from Jay Cutler (R. Gould kick, MIN 7–14)

**Third quarter**

- MIN – Harrison Smith 56-yd interception return (B. Walsh kick, MIN 7–21)

**Fourth quarter**

- CHI – Brandon Marshall 16-yd pass from Jason Campbell (R. Gould kick, MIN 14–21)

**Top passers**

- CHI – Jay Cutler – 22/44, 260 yds, 1 TD, 2 INT
- MIN – Christian Ponder – 11/16, 91 yds, 1 INT

**Top rushers**

- CHI – Matt Forte – 13 car, 85 yds
- MIN – Adrian Peterson – 31 car, 154 yds, 2 TD

**Top receivers**

- CHI – Brandon Marshall – 10 car, 160 yds, 1 TD
- MIN – Michael Jenkins – 4 rec, 36 yds

**Top tacklers**

- CHI – Lance Briggs – 6 tkls, 5 ast
- MIN – Jasper Brinkley – 9 tkls, 3 ast

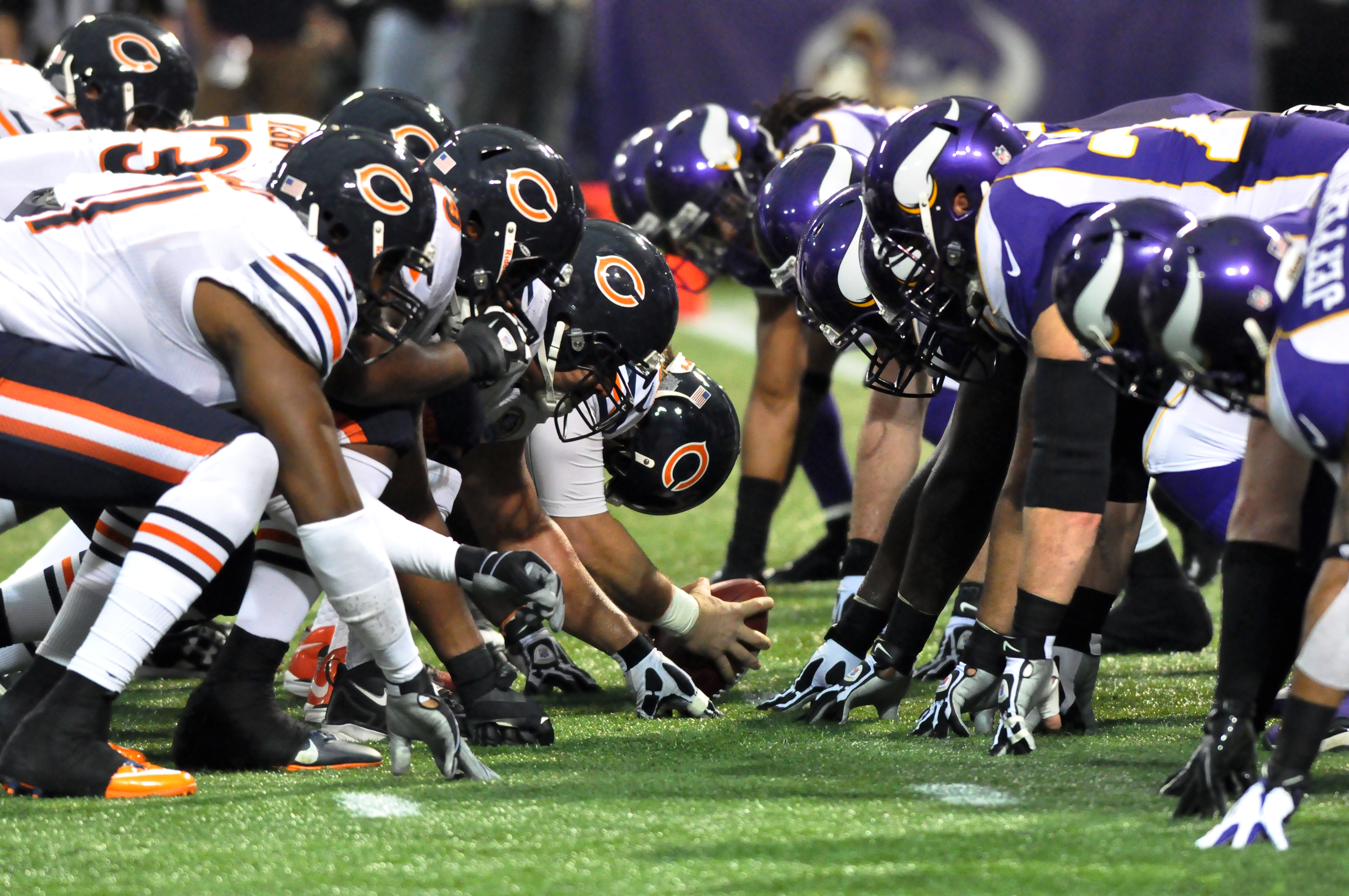
Chicago playing at the Minnesota Vikings on December 9, 2012

Two weeks after their last meeting, the Bears faced the Vikings again, this time in Minnesota. During pregame warmups, the Bears lost kicker Robbie Gould to a left calf sprain, and was replaced by punter Adam Podlesh, though Gould would eventually kick the Bears extra points and an onside kick. Like the previous meeting, the game was injury-laden for the Bears, having lost Brian Urlacher, Tim Jennings, Stephen Paea and Earl Bennett before the game, while Henry Melton, Shea McClellin, Craig Steltz and Sherrick McManis were lost during the game. On the game's first play from scrimmage, Adrian Peterson broke free for a 51-yard gain, and scored on a one-yard touchdown run a few plays later. On Chicago's first drive, Jay Cutler's pass intended for Alshon Jeffery was intercepted by Josh Robinson, who returned the pick to the five-yard line, setting up Peterson's second one-yard touchdown run. Peterson would end the game rushing for a Vikings-record 104 yards. The Bears would finally score on Cutler's 23-yard touchdown pass to Jeffery to end the first half. The Vikings, however, scored once again when rookie Harrison Smith intercepted Cutler and returned the pick 56-yards for a touchdown. Cutler would later be lost for the game due to a neck injury when he was hit by Everson Griffen, and was replaced by Jason Campbell, who threw a 16-yard touchdown pass to Brandon Marshall to bring the Bears seven points behind. Marshall caught ten passes for 160 yards in the game, and surpassed Marty Booker's 2002 franchise season reception record with 101. However, Gould's onside kick was recovered by Kyle Rudolph, ending the game with a Vikings victory, and snapping the Bears six-game winning streak in the rivalry.

With the loss, the Bears dropped to 8–5. The loss is the sixth straight by the Bears in December, dating back to the 2011 season. The Bears also dropped behind the Packers in the NFC North after the latter defeated the Detroit Lions 27–20.

==== Week 15: vs. Green Bay Packers ====
Week Fifteen: Green Bay Packers at Chicago Bears – Game summary

Quarter	1	2	3	4	Total
**Packers**	0	14	7	0	**21**
Bears	0	7	3	3	**13**

at Soldier Field, Chicago, Illinois

- Date: December 16
- Game time: 12:00 p.m. CST
- Game weather: 45 °F (7 °C), cloudy
- Game attendance: 62,534
- Referee: Walt Anderson
- TV announcers (Fox): Joe Buck, Troy Aikman and Pam Oliver
- Gamebook

Game information

**First quarter**

**Second quarter**

- CHI – Brandon Marshall 15-yd pass from Jay Cutler (R. Gould kick, CHI 7–0)
- GB – James Jones 29-yd pass from Aaron Rodgers (M. Crosby kick, TIE 7–7)
- GB – James Jones 8-yd pass from Aaron Rodgers (M. Crosby kick, GB 7–14)

**Third quarter**

- GB – James Jones 6-yd pass from Aaron Rodgers (M. Crosby kick, GB 7–21)
- CHI – Olindo Mare 34-yd FG (GB 10–21)

**Fourth quarter**

- CHI – Olindo Mare 34-yd FG (GB 13–21)

**Top passers**

- GB – Aaron Rodgers – 23/36, 291 yds, 3 TD
- CHI – Jay Cutler – 12/21, 135 yds, 1 TD, 1 INT

**Top rushers**

- GB – Alex Green – 13 car, 35 yds
- CHI – Matt Forte – 20 car, 69 yds

**Top receivers**

- GB – Randall Cobb – 6 rec, 115 yds
- CHI – Brandon Marshall – 6 rec, 56 yds, 1 TD

**Top tacklers**

- GB – Brad Jones – 6 tkls, 2 ast
- CHI – Lance Briggs – 5 tkls, 4 ast

The Bears donned their 1940s throwbacks in their second game against the Green Bay Packers in an NFC North showdown, with a division title on the line for the Packers. After a scoreless first quarter, the Bears scored on Jay Cutler's 15-yard touchdown pass to Brandon Marshall. However, the Packers scored three unanswered touchdowns on Aaron Rodgers' touchdown passes to James Jones. The defending league MVP completed 23 of 36 passes for 291 yards, along with the touchdown passes. Cutler completed 12 of 21 passes for 135 yards with one touchdown, one interception and a 72.5 passer rating, and was sacked four times. After the Packers scored their first touchdown on Rodgers' touchdown pass to Jones late in the first half, Cutler's pass intended for Devin Hester was intercepted by Casey Hayward, which then became an eight-yard touchdown pass. The Packers then opened the second half when Rodgers threw another touchdown pass to Jones. Bears receiver Alshon Jeffery was later flagged for pass interference, nullifying a touchdown pass, and the Bears had to resort to Olindo Mare-substituting for Robbie Gould-kicking a 34-yard field goal. On the Bears following drive, they went three-and-out, and on the punt return, Randall Cobb threw a lateral to Jeremy Ross, who fumbled the ball. Anthony Walters then recovered the ball, but the Bears failed to capitalize on the turnover, failing to gain a yard, and the team had to resort to Mare's second 34-yard field goal. However, the Packers would hang on to defeat Chicago 21–13, clinching the NFC North.

With the Bears' sixth straight loss to the Packers in the rivalry, the Bears dropped to 8–6. The ten penalties committed for 91 yards by the Bears are a season high.

==== Week 16: at Arizona Cardinals ====
Week Sixteen: Chicago Bears at Arizona Cardinals – Game summary

Quarter	1	2	3	4	Total
**Bears**	7	14	7	0	**28**
Cardinals	3	3	0	7	**13**

at University of Phoenix Stadium, Glendale, Arizona

- Date: December 23
- Game time: 3:25 p.m. CST/2:25 p.m. MST
- Game weather: 62 °F (17 °C), sunny
- Game attendance: 62,734
- Referee: Terry McAulay
- TV announcers (Fox): Dick Stockton, John Lynch and Jennifer Hale
- Gamebook

Game information

**First quarter**

- CHI – Zack Bowman 1-yd fumble return (O. Mare kick, CHI 7–0)
- ARI – Jay Feely 49-yd FG (CHI 7–3)

**Second quarter**

- CHI – Matt Forte 4-yd run (O. Mare kick, CHI 14–3)
- ARI – Jay Feely 35-yd FG (CHI 14–6)
- CHI – Brandon Marshall 11-yd pass from Jay Cutler (O. Mare kick, CHI 21–6)

**Third quarter**

- CHI – Charles Tillman 10-yd interception return (O. Mare kick, CHI 28–6)

**Fourth quarter**

- ARI – Justin Bethel 82-yd blocked field goal return (J. Feely kick, CHI 28–13)

**Top passers**

- CHI – Jay Cutler – 12/26, 146 yds, 1 TD
- ARI – Ryan Lindley – 17/30, 141 yds, 1 INT

**Top rushers**

- CHI – Matt Forte – 12 car, 88 yds, 1 TD
- ARI – LaRod Stephens-Howling – 10 car, 19 yds

**Top receivers**

- CHI – Brandon Marshall – 6 rec, 68 yds, 1 TD
- ARI – Larry Fitzgerald – 8 rec, 111 yds

**Top tacklers**

- CHI – Charles Tillman – 8 tkls, 1 INT
- ARI – Calais Campbell – 7 tkls, 1 ast, 1 sck

The Bears fought to continue their playoff chances against the Arizona Cardinals, with a loss knocking the Bears out of contention. Jay Cutler began the game having his first six passes fall incomplete, though he ended the game completing 12 of 26 for 146 yards and a touchdown. The Bears started the game on a strong note when Cardinals running back Beanie Wells fumbled the ball, and was recovered by Zack Bowman in the end zone, giving the Bears the lead. Arizona then settled for Jay Feely's 49-yard field goal. On the following drive, Matt Forte broke free for a 36-yard run, followed by Brandon Marshall's 30-yard catch reaching the Cardinals 4-yard line, where Forte ran in untouched to increase the score to 14–3. The Cardinals later tried a fake field goal instead of attempting a 50-yard field goal, but failed. Later in the game, D. J. Moore muffed Dave Zastudil's punt, which was recovered by Arizona's Michael Adams. However, the Cardinals were only able to get a field goal. On Chicago's final possession of the first half, Cutler completed all of his passes, and the Bears scored on Cutler's 11-yard pass to Marshall. In the second half, Charles Tillman intercepted Ryan Lindley, and had the pick returned 10-yards for a touchdown. The interception return is the eighth by the team, one shy of the NFL record. Lindley was later replaced by Brian Hoyer, who was also ineffective, having a pass intercepted by Kelvin Hayden, who took it 39 yards to the Arizona 10. The Bears failed to take advantage of the interception, as Olindo Mare's field goal was blocked by Adrian Wilson, which was recovered by Justin Bethel, who returned the blocked kick 82 yards for the Cardinals lone touchdown.

With the win, the Bears kept their playoff hopes alive, as their record improved to 9–6. In order for the Bears to qualify for the playoffs, they must defeat the Lions in Week 17, while having the Packers defeat the Vikings.

==== Week 17: at Detroit Lions ====
Week Seventeen: Chicago Bears at Detroit Lions – Game summary

Quarter	1	2	3	4	Total
**Bears**	10	10	3	3	**26**
Lions	3	7	7	7	**24**

at Ford Field, Detroit, Michigan

- Date: December 30
- Game time: 1:00 p.m. EST/12:00 p.m. CST
- Game weather: Played indoors (dome stadium)
- Game attendance: 64,451
- Referee: Bill Leavy
- TV announcers (Fox): Kenny Albert, Daryl Johnston and Tony Siragusa
- Gamebook

Game information

**First quarter**

- DET – Jason Hanson 44-yd FG (DET 0–3)
- CHI – Earl Bennett 60-yd pass from Jay Cutler (O. Mare kick, CHI 7–3)
- CHI – Olindo Mare 33-yd FG (CHI 10–3)

**Second quarter**

- CHI – Matt Forte 1-yd run (O. Mare kick, CHI 17–3)
- CHI – Olindo Mare 40-yd FG (CHI 20–3)
- DET – Kris Durham 25-yd pass from Matthew Stafford (J. Hanson kick, CHI 20–10)

**Third quarter**

- DET – Will Heller 10-yd pass from Matthew Stafford (J. Hanson kick, CHI 20–17)
- CHI – Olindo Mare 28-yd FG (CHI 23–17)

**Fourth quarter**

- CHI – Olindo Mare 20-yd FG (CHI 26–17)
- DET – Brian Robiskie 9-yd pass from Matthew Stafford (J. Hanson kick, CHI 26–24)

**Top passers**

- CHI – Jay Cutler – 18/31, 257 yds, 1 TD
- DET – Matthew Stafford – 24/42, 272 yds, 3 TD, 1 INT

**Top rushers**

- CHI – Matt Forte – 24 car, 103 yds, 1 TD
- DET – Mikel Leshoure – 15 car, 57 yds

**Top receivers**

- CHI – Earl Bennett – 5 rec, 109 yds, 1 TD
- DET – Calvin Johnson – 5 rec, 72 yds

**Top tacklers**

- CHI – Nick Roach – 7 tkls, 1 ast
- DET – Ron Bartell – 6 tkls, 3 ast

In the final week of the season, the Bears played their second game against the Lions with a spot in the playoffs on the line. The Bears fell behind the Lions after the Bears drive stalled, and Jason Hanson kicked a field goal. Chicago then struck back, with Jay Cutler throwing a swing pass to Earl Bennett, who ran 60 yards for the touchdown; the pass is the longest completion of the season for the Bears. On the eventual kickoff, Joique Bell fumbled, and the Bears scored on a field goal. In the second quarter, Lions quarterback Matthew Stafford fumbled, and the ball was recovered by Julius Peppers, who reached Detroit's 10-yard line, and Matt Forte later scored on a one-yard run. The Bears recorded another takeaway when Tim Jennings intercepted Stafford and returned the pick to Detroit's 23-yard line, and the Bears scored another field goal. Detroit scored the final points of the half on Stafford's 25-yard touchdown pass to Kris Durham to make the score at halftime 20–10 in Chicago's favor. In the second half, the Lions scored again on Stafford's 10-yard touchdown pass to Will Heller. The Bears then had to settle for Olindo Mare kicking another field goal after Cutler failed to connect with Brandon Marshall. Chicago later had to kick another field goal when Cutler again failed to connect with Marshall. The Lions then drew within two points when Stafford threw a nine-yard touchdown pass to Brian Robiskie. However, Detroit would fail to score again and keep Chicago from running out the clock.

With the win, Chicago eliminated the New York Giants from playoff contention, but the Bears would also miss the playoffs after the Vikings defeated the Packers 37–34. The Bears ended the season with a 10–6 record.

=== Standings ===
NFC North
	W	L	T	PCT	DIV	CONF	PF	PA	STK
^{(3)} Green Bay Packers	11	5	0	.688	5–1	8–4	433	336	L1
^{(6)} Minnesota Vikings	10	6	0	.625	4–2	7–5	379	348	W4
Chicago Bears	10	6	0	.625	3–3	7–5	375	277	W2
Detroit Lions	4	12	0	.250	0–6	3–9	372	437	L8

==== Standings breakdown ====
	W	L	T	Pct.	PF	PA
Home	5	3	0	.625	164	123
Away	5	3	0	.625	211	154
NFC North Opponents	3	3	0	.500	104	106
AFC Opponents	3	1	0	.750	139	57
NFC Opponents	7	5	0	.583	234	220
By Stadium Type
Indoors	1	1	0	.500	40	45
Outdoors (Note: The retractable roofs were open during the Cowboys' and Cardinals' games.)	9	5	0	.643	324	232

== Statistical leaders ==
Table key
§	Bears franchise record

=== Regular season ===
Category	Player(s)	Value	NFL Rank	NFC Rank
Passing yards	Jay Cutler	3,033 yards	24th	12th
Passing touchdowns	Jay Cutler	19 TDs	21st	11th
Rushing yards	Matt Forte	1,094 yards	T-12th	6th
Rushing touchdowns	Michael Bush/Matt Forte	5 TDs	T-20th	T-11th
Receptions	Brandon Marshall	118 rec §	T-2nd	2nd
Receiving yards	Brandon Marshall	1,508 yards §	3rd	2nd
Receiving touchdowns	Brandon Marshall	11 TDs	T-4th	3rd
Points	Robbie Gould	96 points	25th	13th
Kickoff Return Yards	Devin Hester	295 yards	22nd	10th
Punt return Yards	Devin Hester	621 yards	32nd	6th
Tackles (combined)	Lance Briggs	40 tackles	40th	T-22nd
Sacks	Julius Peppers	11.5 sacks	T-9th	T-5th
Interceptions	Tim Jennings	9 INTs	1st	1st

Stats updated to the end of the season (Week 17).

=== Statistical league rankings ===
- Total Offense (YPG): 310.6 yds (28th NFL)
- Passing (YPG): 187.4 yds (29th NFL)
- Rushing (YPG): 123.1 yds (10th NFL)
- Points (PPG): 23.4 (16th NFL)
- Total Defense (YPG): 315.6 yds (5th NFL)
- Passing (YPG): 213.9 yds (8th NFL)
- Rushing (YPG): 101.7 yds (8th NFL)
- Points (PPG): 17.3 (3rd NFL)

Stats updated to the end of the season (Week 17).

== Awards and records ==
=== Awards ===
==== Weekly awards ====
- CB Charles Tillman was named the NFC Defensive Player of the Week for games played during Week 5.
- CB Charles Tillman was named the NFC Defensive Player of the Week for games played during Week 7.
- MLB Brian Urlacher was named the NFC Defensive Player of the Week for games played during Week 9.
- CB Sherrick McManis was named the NFC Special Teams Player of the Week for games played during Week 9.
- DE Julius Peppers was named the NFC Defensive Player of the Week for games played during Week 16.

==== Monthly awards ====
- CB Tim Jennings was named the NFC Defensive Player of the Month for the month of September.
- CB Charles Tillman was named the NFC Defensive Player of the Month for the month of October.

=== Records ===
==== Team ====
===== Game =====
- The Bears set a franchise record for most points scored in the first quarter with 28 points. The mark was set against the Tennessee Titans in Week 9. The previous mark was 24 points set against the San Francisco 49ers in 2006.
- The Bears became the first team in NFL history to score a passing touchdown, rushing touchdown, defensive interception return for a touchdown, and a blocked punt return for a touchdown in the same quarter by completing the feat against the Tennessee Titans in Week 9 during the first quarter of the game.

===== Season =====
- The Bears set a franchise record for most consecutive games with an interception return for a touchdown with 3 games. The record occurred in games against the St. Louis Rams (Week 3), Dallas Cowboys (Week 4), and Jacksonville Jaguars (Week 5). The previous record was 2 consecutive games.
- The Bears became the first team in NFL history to return five interceptions for touchdowns in the first five contests in a season.
- The Bears became the first team in NFL history to return six interceptions for touchdowns in the first seven contests in a season.
- The Bears became the first team in NFL history to return seven interceptions for touchdowns in the first eight contests in a season.
- The Bears set a franchise record for most defensive interceptions returned for a touchdown in a season with 9. The initial mark of 6 touchdowns was set over the first 7 games. The previous record of 5 was set in 2004 over a full 16-game season.

==== Individual ====
===== Game =====
- CB Charles Tillman and LB Lance Briggs became the first teammates in NFL history to score defensive touchdowns in consecutive games. The pair first scored against the Dallas Cowboys in Week 4, before scoring again against the Jacksonville Jaguars in Week 5.
- CB Charles Tillman became the first player in NFL history to force four fumbles in one game. The feat came against the Tennessee Titans in Week 9.

===== Season =====
- WR Brandon Marshall set the Bears franchise record for most receptions, single season with 118 receptions. The previous record of 100 receptions was set by WR Marty Booker during the 2001 season.
- WR Brandon Marshall set the Bears franchise record for most receiving yards, single season with 1,508 receiving yards. The previous record of 1,400 receiving yards was set by WR Marcus Robinson during the 1999 season.
- WR Brandon Marshall set the Bears franchise record for most 100+ yard receiving yards in a game, single season with 7 games.
- CB Charles Tillman set the Bears franchise record for most forced fumbles, single season with 10 forced fumbles during the season.

===== Career =====
- LS Patrick Mannelly set the Bears franchise record for the most seasons in a Bears uniform with 15 when he stepped on the field in Week 1 against the Indianapolis Colts. The previous mark of 14 seasons was held by Bill George and Doug Buffone.
- CB Charles Tillman set the Bears franchise record for the most defensive touchdowns in a career with 8 when he returned an interception for a touchdown against the Jacksonville Jaguars in Week 5. Tilman ended the season by extending the franchise mark to 9 defensive touchdowns. The previous mark of 7 touchdowns was held by FS Mike Brown.
- CB Charles Tillman set the Bears franchise record for most forced fumbles in a career with 37 forced fumbles. Tillman set the mark by forcing 10 fumbles during the 2012 season. The previous mark was held by DE Richard Dent with 34 forced fumbles over his career.

== Staff ==
2012 Chicago Bears staff
Front office: Secretary of the board of directors – Virginia Halas McCaskey; Chairman – George McCaskey; President/CEO – Ted Phillips; General manager – Phil Emery; Vice president of football administration/general counsel – Cliff Stein; Director of pro scouting – Chris Ballard; Director of college scouting – Marty Barrett; Assistant director of pro scouting – Dwayne Joseph; Assistant director of pro scouting – Kevin Turks; Head coaches: Head coach – Lovie Smith; Assistant head coach/defensive coordinator – Rod Marinelli; Offensive coaches: Offensive coordinator – Mike Tice; Quarterbacks – Jeremy Bates; Running backs – Tim Spencer; Wide receivers – Darryl Drake; Tight ends – Mike DeBord; Offensive line – Tim Holt; Offensive assistant/wide receivers – Andrew Hayes-Stoker	Defensive coaches: Defensive line – Mike Phair; Linebackers – Bob Babich; Defensive backs – Jon Hoke; Assistant Defensive Backs (Safeties) – Gill Byrd; Defensive assistant/nickelbacks – Mikal Smith; Special teams coaches: Special teams coordinator – Dave Toub; Assistant special teams – Kevin O'Dea; Strength and conditioning: Strength and conditioning coordinator – Rusty Jones; Strength and conditioning assistant – Jim Arthur; Conditioning assistant – Phil Brauch

== Final roster ==
2012 Chicago Bears roster
Quarterbacks (QB): 2 Jason Campbell; 6 Jay Cutler; 12 Josh McCown; Running backs (RB): 25 Armando Allen; 32 Kahlil Bell; 22 Matt Forte; 48 Evan Rodriguez FB; 45 Harvey Unga FB; Wide receivers (WR): 19 Joseph Anderson; 80 Earl Bennett; 23 Devin Hester RS; 17 Alshon Jeffery; 15 Brandon Marshall; 14 Eric Weems; Tight ends (TE): 86 Kyle Adams; 87 Kellen Davis; 89 Matt Spaeth	Offensive linemen (OL): 76 Cory Brandon T; 78 James Brown G; 72 Gabe Carimi G/T; 63 Roberto Garza C; 79 Jonathan Scott T; 67 Chris Spencer C/G; 73 J'Marcus Webb T; 70 Edwin Williams G; Defensive linemen (DL): 93 Nate Collins DT; 71 Israel Idonije DE/DT; 99 Shea McClellin DE; 69 Henry Melton DT; 91 Amobi Okoye DT; 92 Stephen Paea DT; 90 Julius Peppers DE; 98 Corey Wootton DE	Linebackers (LB): 55 Lance Briggs OLB; 52 Blake Costanzo OLB; 57 Dom DeCicco MLB; 59 Jerry Franklin OLB; 58 Geno Hayes OLB; 53 Nick Roach; 97 J. T. Thomas OLB; 54 Brian Urlacher MLB; Defensive backs (DB): 38 Zack Bowman CB; 47 Chris Conte FS; 24 Kelvin Hayden CB; 26 Tim Jennings CB; 30 D. J. Moore CB; 43 Troy Nolan SS; 33 Charles Tillman CB; 37 Anthony Walters FS; 21 Major Wright SS; Special teams (ST): 65 Patrick Mannelly LS; 10 Olindo Mare K; 8 Adam Podlesh P	Practice squad: 74 Derek Dennis T; 31 Isaiah Frey CB; 85 Gabe Miller TE; 83 Dale Moss WR; 68 Chris Riley G; 64 Reggie Stephens C; 94 Aston Whiteside DE; Reserve: 29 Michael Bush RB (IR); 35 Brandon Hardin SS (IR); 13 Johnny Knox WR (PUP); 60 Lance Louis G (IR); 9 Robbie Gould K (IR); 27 Sherrick McManis CB (IR); -- Nick Pieschel G (IR); 62 Chilo Rachal G (NF-Inj.); 20 Craig Steltz SS (IR); 75 Matt Toeaina DT (IR); Rookies in italics 53 active, 10 reserve, 7 practice squad

=== Depth charts ===
==== Week One depth chart ====
Defense

FS
Chris Conte
Anthony Walters

WLB	MLB	SLB
⋅	Brian Urlacher	⋅
Geno Hayes	Geno Hayes	⋅

SS
Major Wright
Craig Steltz

CB
Charles Tillman
Sherrick McManis

DE	DT	DT	DE
Julius Peppers	Stephen Paea	Henry Melton	Israel Idonije
Shea McClellin	Matt Toeaina	Stephen Paea	Shea McClellin

CB
Tim Jennings
Kelvin Hayden

Offense

WR
Brandon Marshall
Earl Bennett

LT	LG	C	RG	RT
J'Marcus Webb	Chris Spencer	Roberto Garza	Lance Louis	Gabe Carimi
Chris Williams	Chilo Rachal	Edwin Williams	Chilo Rachal	Chris Williams

TE
Kellen Davis
Matt Spaeth

WR
Alshon Jeffery
Eric Weems

QB
Jay Cutler
Jason Campbell

RB
Matt Forté
Armando Allen

FB
Evan Rodriguez
Harvey Unga

Special teams
PK Robbie Gould
P Adam Podlesh
P Ryan Quigley
KR Devin Hester
PR Devin Hester
LS Patrick Mannelly
H Adam Podlesh
