= Reggie Stephens =

Reggie Stephens may refer to:

- Reggie Stephens (offensive lineman), American football offensive lineman
- Reggie Stephens (cornerback), American football cornerback
