= James Brown (American football guard) =

American football player (born 1988)

No. 78
- Position: Guard

Personal information
- Born: November 30, 1988 (age 37); Chicago, Illinois, U.S.
- Listed height: 6 ft 4 in (1.93 m)
- Listed weight: 306 lb (139 kg)

Career information
- High school: Amite County (Liberty, Mississippi)
- College: Troy
- NFL draft: 2012: undrafted

Career history
- Chicago Bears (2012–2013); Cleveland Browns (2014)*
- * Offseason or practice squad member only

Awards and highlights
- First-team All-Sun Belt (2011)

Career NFL statistics
- Games played: 5
- Games started: 3
- Stats at Pro Football Reference

James Brown (born November 30, 1988) is an American former professional football player who was a guard in the National Football League (NFL). He went undrafted in the 2012 NFL draft, and was signed by the Chicago Bears after the draft. He played college football for the Troy Trojans. He was also a member of the Cleveland Browns.

== Early life ==
Brown was born on November 30, 1988, in Chicago, Illinois, to Paulina Harness and Ellis Jackson. Brown has three siblings: Ellis Ray Magee, Joseph Harness, and Elaine Brown. He attended Amite County High School in Liberty, Mississippi, where he was teammates with Gabe Jackson. Brown started playing football in eighth grade, and said that football saved his life in 2004, when he opted to workout instead of visiting family, where a cousin of his and a friend were involved in an altercation that later led to them being sentenced to death.

At Amite County, Brown was a two-way lineman. As a freshman, he was named Amite County's Rookie of the Year. He also won 2005 Mississippi state weightlifting championship in 2005. In his sophomore year, he earned Defensive Player of the Year after recording 103 tackles and 14 sacks on the season. After he had a class 2A high 108 pancake blocks in his junior year, he was an All-State selection, and repeated in his senior year.

Regarded as a two-star recruit by Rivals.com, Brown was not ranked among the top offensive lineman prospects of his class. He initially drew interest from Mississippi and Louisiana State, but that began to fade when his academic struggles became clear. On National Signing Day 2008, Brown chose to attend Southern Mississippi, over offers from Alcorn State, Arkansas State, and Jackson State, but never managed to meet the qualification standards. Instead, he had to opt for the junior college route.

== College career ==
Before enrolling at Troy University, Brown played at Southwest Mississippi Community College, and was eventually named to the second-team All-Mississippi Junior College team in his sophomore year. In his three seasons at Troy, Brown excelled, with 66 pancakes in 13 games in 2009. However, he also led the team with 9 penalties, as well as allowing 3.5 sacks. His best performance that year was in a victory over Florida Atlantic when he recorded a season-high 13 pancakes. Before the 2011 season, Brown was placed on the Outland Trophy watchlist, making him only one of just 10 players on the watch list from non-automatic qualifying programs in the FBS, as well as being the only player from the Sun Belt Conference included on the list. He was later invited to the 2012 Senior Bowl. He majored in Criminal Justice.

== Professional career ==
Pre-draft measurables
Height	Weight	Arm length	Hand span	40-yard dash	10-yard split	20-yard split	20-yard shuttle	Three-cone drill	Vertical jump	Broad jump	Bench press
6 ft 3 3/8 in (1.91 m)	306 lb (139 kg)	34 1/2 in (0.88 m)	10 1/4 in (0.26 m)	5.19 s	1.81 s	3.03 s	4.78 s	7.70 s	25 1/2 in (0.65 m)	8 ft 6 in (2.59 m)	24 reps
All values from the NFL Combine

Brown was projected as a mid-round pick, being named the 54th best player in the draft by Mel Kiper and the 93rd best by Pro Football Weekly. Despite his athleticism, Brown wasn't drafted in the 2012 NFL draft, and was named by Scouts and NFL analyst Gil Brandt as the second-best undrafted free agent. Analysts believed that Brown's use of marijuana was a factor of him being undrafted, along with concerns about his speed and strength. Brown was ultimately signed by the Chicago Bears along with 10 others. During rookie minicamps, Brown stood out and impressed Bears head coach Lovie Smith. Smith commented on Brown, stating "He has stood out in the drills. You notice him. He's slim, athletic, good size, smile on his face and he was a pretty good player in college. However (he went undrafted), we're just glad he's in our camp."

He was released on August 31. He was eventually assigned to the practice squad. On November 21, Brown was elevated to the active roster after Chilo Rachal left the team. The Bears waived Brown on August 26, 2014.
