= Terriun Crump =

American football player (born 1989)

Profile
- Position: Wide receiver

Personal information
- Born: July 23, 1989 (age 37); Chicago, Illinois
- Listed height: 6 ft 2 in (1.88 m)
- Listed weight: 223 lb (101 kg)

Career information
- College: Western Illinois
- NFL draft: 2012: undrafted

Career history
- Chicago Bears (2012)*; Edmonton Eskimos (2012)*; Tampa Bay Buccaneers (2013)*
- * Offseason or practice squad member only

Terriun Crump (born July 23, 1989, in Chicago, Illinois) is an American football wide receiver who is currently a free agent. Born in the Chicago area, he attended Rich Central High School and the College of DuPage before enrolling at Western Illinois University.

== College career ==
He played collegiate football for the Western Illinois Leathernecks. In his senior year, he caught 61 passes for 944 yards and 6 touchdowns. By the conclusion of his college career he had amassed 135 receptions for 2,067 yards and 11 touchdowns in three seasons.

== Professional career ==
=== NFL ===
Crump went undrafted in the 2012 NFL draft, but was later signed by the Chicago Bears. He was waived by the Bears on August 26. Crump was re-signed by the Bears on August 29, after the team waived LB Dom DeCicco. Crump was later waived again on August 31.

=== CFL ===
He was added to the practice roster of the Edmonton Eskimos on October 22, 2012. He spent the remainder of the 2012 CFL season on the practice roster. Was released by the Eskimos on April 18, 2013.

=== Tampa Bay Buccaneers ===
On May 22, 2013, Crump signed with the Tampa Bay Buccaneers. On August 27, 2013, he was waived by the Buccaneers.
