= Nick Roach =

American football player (born 1985)

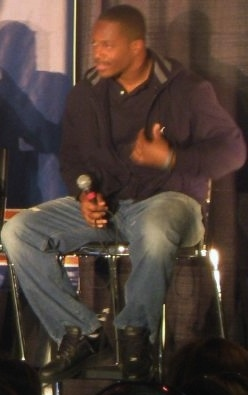
- Roach at the Chicago Bears' 2009 "Football 101" event

No. 53
- Position: Linebacker

Personal information
- Born: June 16, 1985 (age 41); Milwaukee, Wisconsin, U.S.
- Listed height: 6 ft 1 in (1.85 m)
- Listed weight: 234 lb (106 kg)

Career information
- High school: Lutheran (Milwaukee)
- College: Northwestern
- NFL draft: 2007: undrafted

Career history
- San Diego Chargers (2007)*; Chicago Bears (2007–2012); Oakland Raiders (2013–2014)
- * Offseason or practice squad member only

Career NFL statistics
- Total tackles: 349
- Sacks: 9
- Forced fumbles: 8
- Fumble recoveries: 3
- Interceptions: 1
- Stats at Pro Football Reference

Nicholas Alexander Roach (born June 16, 1985) is an American former professional football player who was a linebacker in the National Football League (NFL). He played college football for the Northwestern Wildcats and was signed by the San Diego Chargers as an undrafted free agent in 2007.

Roach was also a member of the Chicago Bears and Oakland Raiders.

== Early life ==
Roach attended high school at Milwaukee Lutheran High School in Milwaukee, Wisconsin where he lettered in football, basketball, and track.

== College career ==
Roach attended Northwestern (2003–06) where he started 32 career games. He finished his career with 241 tackles, 9.0 sacks, 16 TFLs and 2 interceptions. He was named Academic All-Big Ten and team co-MVP as a senior despite having his season cut short due to a broken leg. He led the Wildcats with 62 tackles despite playing in just eight games in 2006. He was Northwestern’s second-leading tackler as a junior with 77 stops, Roach earned NGN Defensive Newcomer of the Year Award as a sophomore after finishing second on the team with 7.5 TFLs. He played in all 13 games as a freshman.

== Professional career ==
=== Chicago Bears ===
Roach went undrafted in 2007 and was signed by the Chicago Bears after being cut from the Chargers. That season, he played in only 3 games, starting none. In 2008, he saw increased playing time, starting nine games and tallying 28 solo tackles in addition to nine assists. 2009 saw Roach make his biggest impact yet on defense, starting 15 games for the Bears. He had 54 solo tackles, 28 assists, two sacks and three fumble recoveries.

On March 6, 2011, Roach was a guest on Chalk Them Up Radio to review the Chicago Bears run to the NFC Championship Game.

In 2012, Roach and Stephen Paea were awarded the Brian Piccolo Award.

=== Oakland Raiders ===
Roach signed with the Oakland Raiders on March 15, 2013. Roach played in all 16 games and lead the team in tackles during the 2013 season.

Due to lingering concussion symptoms that involve issues with his balance and vision, the Raiders released him on March 6, 2015.

== NFL career statistics ==
Legend
| **Bold** | Career high |

=== Regular season ===
| Year | Team | Games | | Tackles | | | | | Interceptions | | | | | Fumbles | | | |
| Year | Team | GP | GS | Cmb | Solo | Ast | Sck | TFL | Int | Yds | TD | Lng | PD | FF | FR | Yds | TD |
|---|---|---|---|---|---|---|---|---|---|---|---|---|---|---|---|---|---|
| 2007 | CHI | 3 | 0 | 3 | 3 | 0 | 0.0 | 0 | 0 | 0 | 0 | 0 | 0 | 0 | 0 | 0 | 0 |
| 2008 | CHI | 14 | 9 | 39 | 30 | 9 | 0.0 | 3 | 0 | 0 | 0 | 0 | 2 | 0 | **1** | 0 | 0 |
| 2009 | CHI | **16** | 15 | 75 | 54 | 21 | 2.0 | **8** | 0 | 0 | 0 | 0 | 3 | 3 | **1** | 0 | 0 |
| 2010 | CHI | 15 | 6 | 16 | 11 | 5 | 0.0 | 0 | 0 | 0 | 0 | 0 | 1 | 0 | 0 | 0 | 0 |
| 2011 | CHI | **16** | 15 | 38 | 31 | 7 | 0.0 | 6 | 0 | 0 | 0 | 0 | **4** | 0 | 0 | 0 | 0 |
| 2012 | CHI | **16** | 14 | 66 | 51 | 15 | 1.5 | 5 | 0 | 0 | 0 | 0 | **4** | 1 | **1** | 0 | 0 |
| 2013 | OAK | **16** | **16** | **112** | **83** | **29** | **5.5** | **8** | **1** | 0 | 0 | 0 | 3 | **4** | 0 | 0 | 0 |
| | | 96 | 75 | 349 | 263 | 86 | 9.0 | 30 | 1 | 0 | 0 | 0 | 17 | 8 | 3 | 0 | 0 |

=== Playoffs ===
| Year | Team | Games | | Tackles | | | | | Interceptions | | | | | Fumbles | | | |
| Year | Team | GP | GS | Cmb | Solo | Ast | Sck | TFL | Int | Yds | TD | Lng | PD | FF | FR | Yds | TD |
|---|---|---|---|---|---|---|---|---|---|---|---|---|---|---|---|---|---|
| 2010 | CHI | **2** | 0 | **3** | **2** | **1** | 0.0 | 0 | 0 | 0 | 0 | 0 | 0 | 0 | 0 | 0 | 0 |
| | | 2 | 0 | 3 | 2 | 1 | 0.0 | 0 | 0 | 0 | 0 | 0 | 0 | 0 | 0 | 0 | 0 |

== Personal life ==
Roach married on February 18, 2012.
