= Patrick Trahan =

American football player (born 1986)

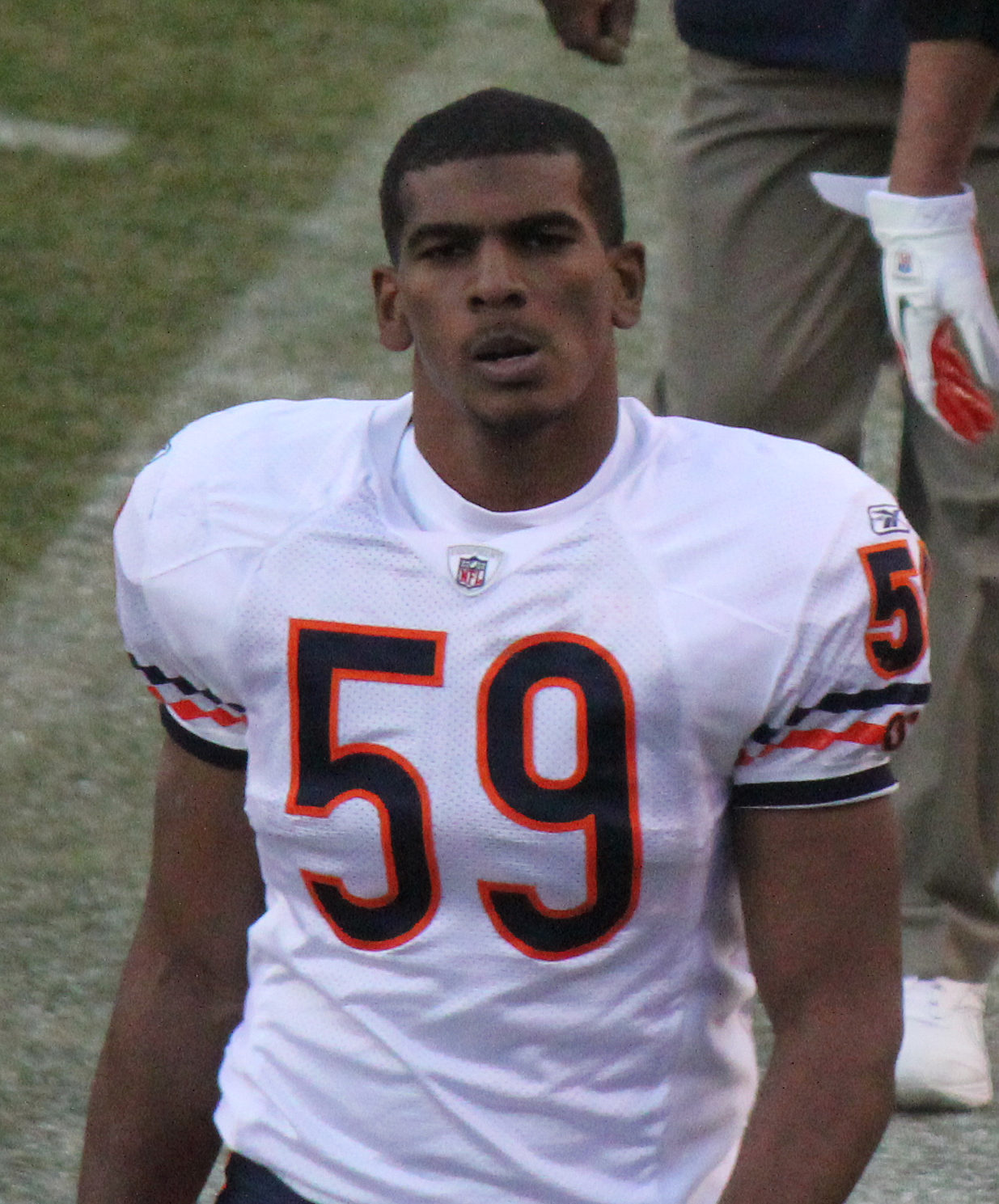
- Trahan in 2011.

No. 48, 59
- Position: Linebacker

Personal information
- Born: November 7, 1986 (age 39); Baton Rouge, Louisiana, U.S.
- Listed height: 6 ft 2 in (1.88 m)
- Listed weight: 236 lb (107 kg)

Career information
- High school: St. Augustine (New Orleans, Louisiana)
- College: Mississippi
- NFL draft: 2010: undrafted

Career history
- Tennessee Titans (2010)*; Chicago Bears (2011−2012); Edmonton Eskimos (2014)
- * Offseason or practice squad member only

Career NFL statistics
- Total tackles: 1
- Stats at Pro Football Reference

Patrick Trahan (born November 7, 1986) is an American former professional football player who was a linebacker in the National Football League (NFL). He was signed by the Tennessee Titans as an undrafted free agent in 2010. He attended Northwest Mississippi Community College for a year before playing college football for one year with the Auburn Tigers and two for the Ole Miss Rebels, with whom he recorded 98 tackles, 7 sacks, 16.5 tackles for loss, one quarterback pressure, two interceptions, three forced fumbles and one fumble recovery. In January 2011, Trahan was signed to the Chicago Bears practice squad after the termination of Rashaun Greer's contract. In November 2011, Trahan was promoted to the active roster after waiving Brian Iwuh.

Trahan was released by the Bears on September 8, 2012. He was once again waived by the Bears on December 4. Trahan was brought back on January 8, 2013, and was again released on August 25.
