= Joseph Anderson (American football) =

American gridiron football player (born 1988)

Joe Anderson
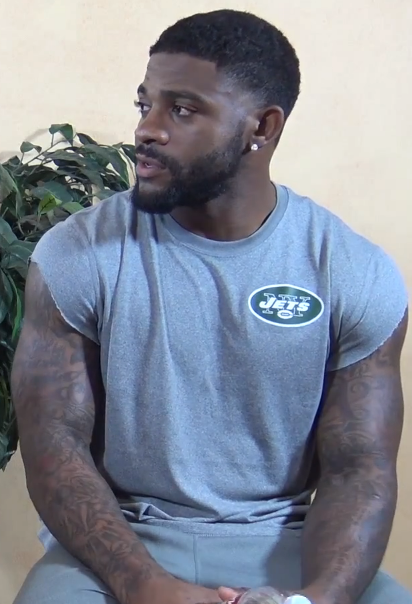
- Anderson in 2016

No. 19
- Position: Wide receiver

Personal information
- Born: November 21, 1988 (age 37); Texarkana, Texas, U.S.
- Listed height: 6 ft 1 in (1.85 m)
- Listed weight: 196 lb (89 kg)

Career information
- High school: Texas (Texarkana)
- College: Texas Southern
- NFL draft: 2012: undrafted

Career history
- Chicago Bears (2012–2013); Philadelphia Eagles (2014)*; New York Jets (2015–2016)*; Montreal Alouettes (2018)*
- * Offseason or practice squad member only

Career NFL statistics
- Return yards: 82
- Total tackles: 4
- Forced fumbles: 1
- Stats at Pro Football Reference

Joseph Anderson (born November 21, 1988) is an American former professional football player who was a wide receiver in the National Football League (NFL). He was signed by the Chicago Bears after going undrafted in the 2012 NFL draft. He played college football for the Louisiana Tech Bulldogs and Texas Southern Tigers.

He was also a member of the Philadelphia Eagles, New York Jets and Montreal Alouettes.

== College career ==
After graduating from Texas High School, Anderson attended Louisiana Tech University before transferring to Texas Southern, where he played for three years, playing in 34 games. He recorded 154 catches for 2010 yards and 13 touchdowns. Anderson also served as return specialist, returning 16 kickoffs for 289 yards. In his final season, Anderson caught 47 passes for 638 yards and four touchdowns, finishing sixth in the Southwestern Athletic Conference for receptions per game and ninth for receiving yards per game.

== Professional career ==
=== Chicago Bears ===
Anderson was not drafted in the 2012 NFL draft, and was later called by the Chicago Bears. After rookie minicamp, Anderson was officially signed by the team. In the third preseason game against the New York Giants, Anderson broke free to score the game-winning touchdown. On August 31, Anderson was among the final cuts, but was signed to the practice squad the following day. On October 30, Anderson was released from the practice squad, and replaced by Raymond Radway. Anderson was later brought back on November 6. He was later activated to the active roster after Robbie Gould was placed on injured reserve. After being activated to the active roster, Anderson stated that he would be active against the Green Bay Packers. Anderson was mainly used on special teams, and against the Packers, Anderson nearly blocked a punt, and made a fierce tackle of Randall Cobb on a kickoff, though the Bears still lost 21–13.

On November 5, 2013, Anderson was placed on injured reserve with an abdominal and groin injury. On November 11, Anderson was placed on waived/injured.

=== Philadelphia Eagles ===
Anderson signed with the Philadelphia Eagles on February 7, 2014. He was waived on March 14, 2014.

=== New York Jets ===
In November 2015, Anderson stood outside the Houston Texans stadium, NRG Stadium, with a sign requesting a spot on the team. Six weeks later, on December 22, he was signed by the New York Jets to the practice squad. After the 2015 season, the Jets released Anderson to open up roster space for their incoming rookies.

=== Montreal Alouettes ===
After participating in The Spring League, he signed with the Montreal Alouettes of the Canadian Football League in October 2018, but was released from the practice roster later that month.
