= Brittan Golden =

American football player (born 1988)

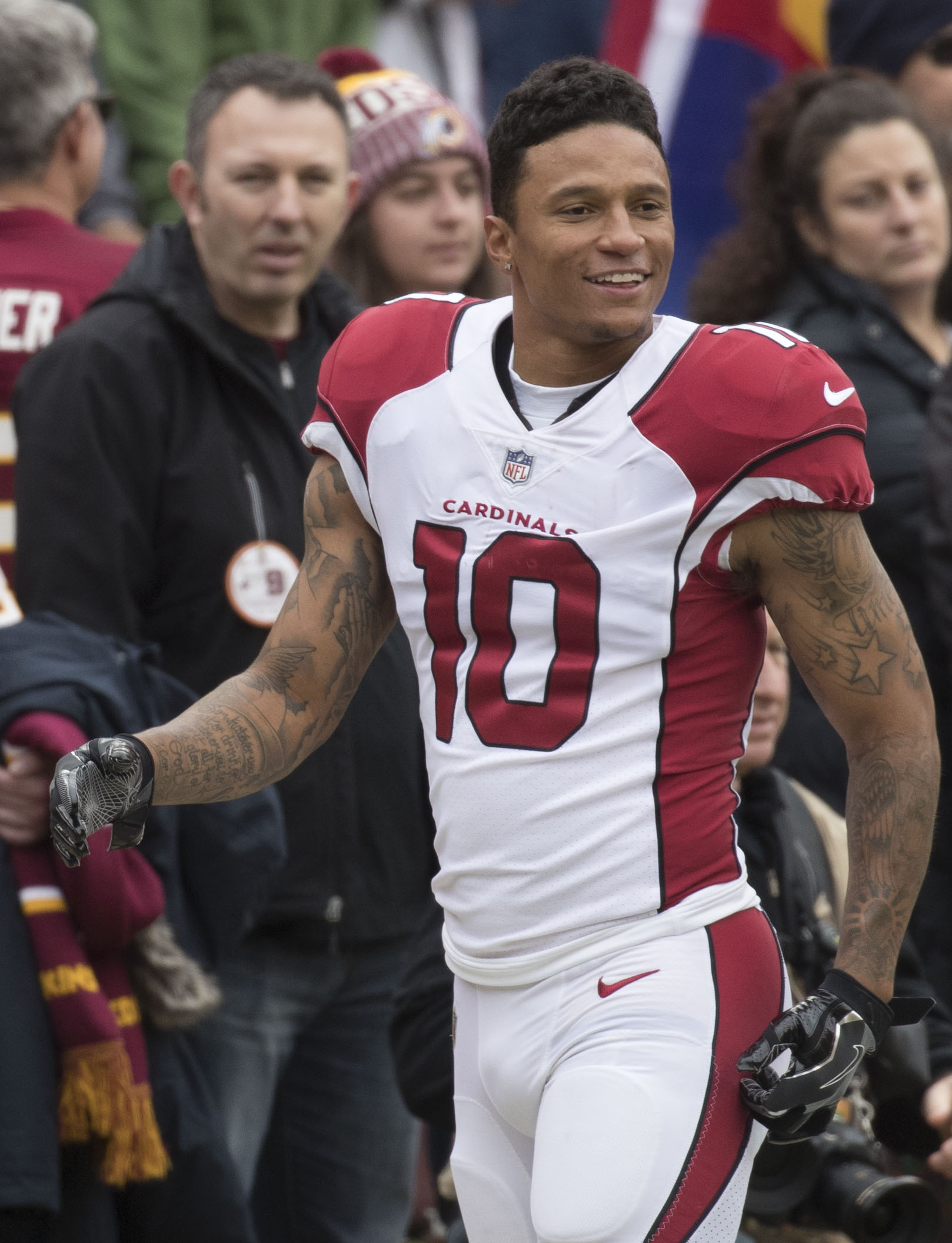
- Golden with the Arizona Cardinals in 2017

No. 10
- Position: Wide receiver

Personal information
- Born: July 20, 1988 (age 38); Lubbock, Texas, U.S.
- Listed height: 5 ft 11 in (1.80 m)
- Listed weight: 186 lb (84 kg)

Career information
- High school: Denver City (Denver City, Texas)
- College: West Texas A&M (2007–2011)
- NFL draft: 2012: undrafted

Career history
- Chicago Bears (2012)*; Jacksonville Jaguars (2012)*; Chicago Bears (2013)*; Arizona Cardinals (2013–2017); New York Giants (2019)*
- * Offseason or practice squad member only

Career NFL statistics
- Receptions: 18
- Receiving yards: 293
- Receiving touchdowns: 1
- Stats at Pro Football Reference

Brittan Golden (born July 20, 1988) is an American former professional football player who was a wide receiver in the National Football League (NFL). He played college football for the West Texas A&M Buffaloes. He was signed by the Chicago Bears after going unselected in the 2012 NFL draft. He also played for the Jacksonville Jaguars, Arizona Cardinals, and New York Giants.

== Professional career ==
=== Chicago Bears (first stint) ===
Golden signed with the Chicago Bears as an undrafted free agent on April 29, 2012. In the final preseason game against the Cleveland Browns, Golden returned a blocked punt 22 yards for a touchdown. However, he was waived on August 31.

=== Jacksonville Jaguars ===
Golden was signed to the Jacksonville Jaguars' practice squad on December 18, 2012.

=== Chicago Bears (second stint) ===
On January 4, 2013, Golden was brought back by the Bears. He was among the final roster cuts on August 30.

=== Arizona Cardinals ===
Golden was signed to the Arizona Cardinals' practice squad on September 17, 2013. Later the same season Golden was promoted 53-man roster. The Cardinals released Golden on August 30, 2014. He was signed back to the active roster on December 16, 2014.

On September 3, 2016, Golden was released by the Cardinals and was signed to the practice squad the next day. He was promoted to the active roster on October 4, 2016. He caught his first career touchdown in Week 14 on a 9-yard pass from Carson Palmer. He played in 12 games with one start in 2016, recording eight receptions for 82 yards and one touchdown.

Golden played in 13 games in 2017, recording five receptions for 70 yards. He suffered a broken arm in Week 15 and was placed on injured reserve on December 18, 2017.

=== New York Giants ===
On January 2, 2019, Golden signed a reserve/future contract with the New York Giants. He was placed on injured reserve on August 31, 2019. He was released from injured reserve with an injury settlement on September 9.
