= Brandon Hardin =

American football player (born 1989)

No. 35
- Position: Safety

Personal information
- Born: October 30, 1989 (age 37); Kealakekua, Hawaii, U.S.
- Listed height: 6 ft 3 in (1.91 m)
- Listed weight: 217 lb (98 kg)

Career information
- High school: Honolulu (HI) Kamehameha
- College: Oregon State (2007–2011)
- NFL draft: 2012: 3rd round, 79th overall pick

Career history
- Chicago Bears (2012–2013); New York Jets (2014)*
- * Offseason or practice squad member only
- Stats at Pro Football Reference

Brandon Hardin (born October 30, 1989) is an American former professional football player who was a safety for two seasons in the National Football League (NFL). He played college football for the Oregon State Beavers before being selected by the Chicago Bears in the third round of the 2012 NFL draft.

== College career ==
In his college career, he registered 105 tackles, one interception, three forced fumbles and one fumble recovery in 38 games. He started all 12 games at right cornerback in 2010, recording 63 tackles and three forced fumbles. He missed the 2011 season due to injury, but played in the East-West Shrine Game anyway.

== Professional career ==
=== Chicago Bears ===
The Chicago Bears chose Hardin in the third round of the 2012 NFL draft despite him missing the entire 2011 college football season with a shoulder ailment and having an extensive injury history during his career at Oregon State. NFL Network draft analyst Mike Mayock called Hardin "a big, good-looking kid who will definitely play inside in Chicago."

On May 15, the Bears signed Hardin to a 4-year contract, making him the last of the Bears draft picks to sign. Hardin was also reunited with Stephen Paea. "If I had one word to describe him, it would be a beast," Hardin said. "He’s just strong as hell. When he was our d-tackle and I was playing corner, it was good knowing he was in there rushing the quarterback."

On August 18, 2012, during a pre-season game against the Washington Redskins, Hardin left the 3rd quarter with a neck injury, and had to be carted off the field. The injury came when he was tackling Redskins tight end Logan Paulsen, which caused him to lie on the field for 10 minutes. His head was immobilized, but he showed mobility in his arms. Hardin was later released from the hospital a day later. Hardin was placed on injured reserve shortly later.

In the 2013 preseason finale against the Cleveland Browns, Hardin broke his scapula, and was subsequently released on August 31.

=== New York Jets ===
Hardin was signed by the New York Jets to a future/reserve contract on January 15, 2014. Hardin was released on August 1.

== Personal life ==
In June 2012, Hardin graduated with a degree in business administration.
