= Alvester Alexander =

American gridiron football player (born 1990)

Profile
- Position: Running back

Personal information
- Born: October 17, 1990 (age 36); Houston, Texas, U.S.
- Listed height: 5 ft 11 in (1.80 m)
- Listed weight: 212 lb (96 kg)

Career information
- High school: C.E. King High School
- College: Wyoming
- NFL draft: 2012: undrafted

Career history
- Chicago Bears (2012)*; Indianapolis Colts (2012)*; Tennessee Titans (2012)*; Indianapolis Colts (2013)*; Tennessee Titans (2013)*; Pittsburgh Steelers (2013–2014)*; Ottawa Redblacks (2015)*
- * Offseason or practice squad member only
- Stats at Pro Football Reference

Alvester Alexander (born October 17, 1990) is an American former football player. He played college football for the Wyoming Cowboys.

== Professional career ==
On April 29, 2012, the Chicago Bears signed Alexander as an undrafted free agent. On July 17, 2012, he was cut from the Bears roster.

On August 14, 2012, he signed with the Indianapolis Colts. On December 11, 2012, he was cut.

On December 26, he signed with the Tennessee Titans.

On August 17, 2013, he signed with the Pittsburgh Steelers. He spent the entire 2013 season on their practice squad. At the end of the season the Steelers signed him to Reserve/Future Contract. He signed with the Ottawa Redblacks in 2015.

Alexander participated in The Spring League in 2017.
