= Dwayne Joseph =

American football player and executive (born 1972)

Detroit Lions
- Title: Vice President of Player Personnel

Personal information
- Born: June 2, 1972 (age 54); Miami, Florida, U.S.
- Listed height: 5 ft 9 in (1.75 m)
- Listed weight: 186 lb (84 kg)

Career information
- High school: Carol City
- College: Syracuse (1990-1993)
- NFL draft: 1994: undrafted

Career history

Playing
- Chicago Bears (1994–1996)

Operations
- Chicago Bears (1998–2003); Coordinator of player programs (1998-2000); Director of player development (2001-2003); Miami Dolphins (2004–2011); Regional scout (2004-2006); Assistant director of pro personnel (2007); Regional scout (2008-2011); Chicago Bears (2012–2014); Assistant director of college scouting (2012); Assistant director of pro personnel (2013-2015); Philadelphia Eagles (2015–2018) Director of pro personnel; Oakland / Las Vegas Raiders (2019–2023) Director of pro scouting; Detroit Lions (2024–Present); Director of scouting (2024-2025); Vice president of player personnel (2026-present)

Awards and highlights
- Super Bowl champion (LII)

Career NFL statistics
- Total tackles: 34
- Forced fumbles: 1
- Interceptions: 2
- Stats at Pro Football Reference

Dwayne Leonard Joseph (born June 2, 1972) is an American football executive and former player who is the vice president of player personnel for the Detroit Lions of the National Football League (NFL).

== Playing career ==
=== College ===
Joseph was a letterman in his college career and was the captain of the Syracuse Orange football team in his senior year.

=== National Football League ===
==== Chicago Bears ====
Pre-draft measurables
Height	Weight	Arm length	Hand span	40-yard dash	10-yard split	20-yard split	20-yard shuttle	Vertical jump	Broad jump	Bench press
5 ft 9 3/8 in (1.76 m)	188 lb (85 kg)	31 in (0.79 m)	10 in (0.25 m)	4.74 s	1.58 s	2.67 s	4.35 s	34.5 in (0.88 m)	10 ft 0 in (3.05 m)	15 reps
All values from NFL Combine

After going undrafted, Joseph played for the Bears from 1994 to 1996. He spent much of his rookie season with the practice squad. In 1995, Joseph recorded his first career interception in his pro debut. He eventually played in all 16 games, and started one. During the 1995 season, Joseph recorded two interceptions, four passes defended, and a forced fumble. He spent the 1996 season on injured reserve, and was released in training camp a year later.

== Executive career ==
=== Chicago Bears ===
Three years after his playing career ended, Joseph was hired by the Bears to be the Coordinator of Player Programs, and was promoted to Director of Player Development in 2001.

=== Miami Dolphins ===
In 2004, Joseph was hired as a pro scout for the Miami Dolphins.

In 2005, Joseph became the Dolphins representative at the NFL-Stanford University Program for Managers. In 2007, Joseph became the Dolphins assistant director of pro personnel.

=== Chicago Bears (second stint) ===
In 2012, Joseph was hired by new Bears general manager Phil Emery as assistant director of pro scouting.

On May 6, 2013, Joseph was promoted to assistant director of pro personnel.

=== Philadelphia Eagles ===
Joseph was hired as the director of pro personnel of Philadelphia Eagles in May 2015. Joseph won his first Super Bowl when the Eagles defeated the New England Patriots in Super Bowl LII.

=== Oakland / Las Vegas Raiders ===
In 2019, Joseph was hired by the Oakland Raiders as their director of pro scouting.

=== Detroit Lions ===
In 2024, Joseph joined the Detroit Lions as the team's director of scouting. On August 12, 2026, Joseph was promoted to vice president of player personnel.

== Personal life ==
Joseph attended college at Syracuse University, and earned his undergraduate degree in human development, along with a master's degree in education leadership at DePaul University.

Father to Damien Joseph who goes to St. Augustine Prep and lives in Mullica Hill, 16 years old.
