= Reggie Stephens (offensive lineman) =

American football player (born 1987)

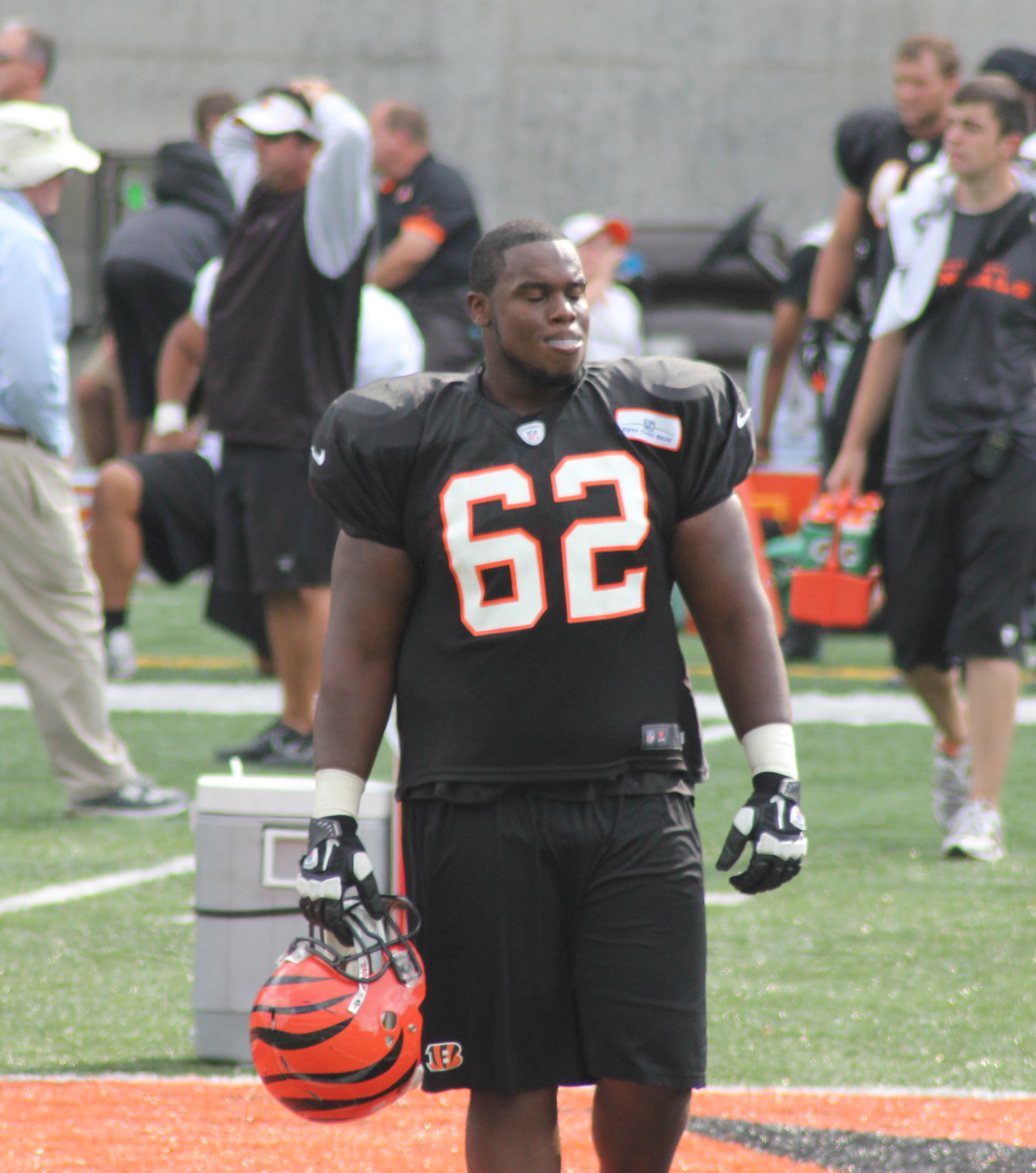
- Stephens at the Bengals' training camp in 2012

No. 61, 62
- Positions: Guard, center

Personal information
- Born: August 28, 1987 (age 39); Rowlett, Texas, U.S.
- Listed height: 6 ft 3 in (1.91 m)
- Listed weight: 325 lb (147 kg)

Career information
- High school: Jesuit (Dallas, Texas)
- College: Iowa State
- NFL draft: 2010: 7th round, 228th overall pick

Career history
- Cincinnati Bengals (2010); Chicago Bears (2011–2012)*; Cincinnati Bengals (2012)*; Buffalo Bills (2012)*; Chicago Bears (2012)*; Baltimore Ravens (2013–2014)*
- * Offseason or practice squad member only

Awards and highlights
- Super Bowl champion (XLVII)
- Stats at Pro Football Reference

Reginald Stephens (born August 28, 1987) is an American former professional football center and guard. He was selected by the Cincinnati Bengals in the seventh round of the 2010 NFL draft. He played college football for Iowa State University. He was also a member of the Chicago Bears, Buffalo Bills, and Baltimore Ravens.

== Early life ==
Stephens attended and played high school football at Jesuit College Preparatory School of Dallas. His family attended all of his games and supports his choices and career.

== College career ==
Stephens played college football at Iowa State University.

== Professional career ==
=== Cincinnati Bengals ===
Stephens was selected in the seventh round of the 2010 NFL draft by the Cincinnati Bengals with the 228th overall pick. He was waived on September 4, 2011.

=== Chicago Bears (first stint) ===
On January 6, 2012, Stephens was signed by the Chicago Bears, as a backup for Roberto Garza.

On May 14, 2012, he was waived by the Bears.

=== Buffalo Bills ===
On October 8, 2012, he signed with the Buffalo Bills.

=== Chicago Bears (second stint) ===
On December 19, 2012, Stephens was brought back by the Bears onto the practice squad.

=== Baltimore Ravens ===
On January 8, 2013, Stephens was signed by the Ravens to the practice squad. The Ravens waived Stephens on August 29, 2014.
