= Dom DeCicco =

American football player and scout (born 1988)

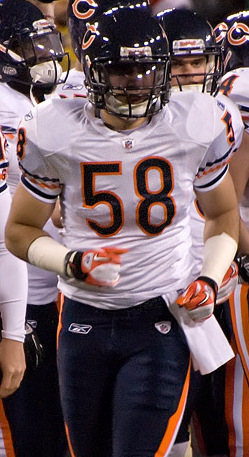
- DeCicco with the Chicago Bears in 2011

San Francisco 49ers
- Title: Director of college scouting

Personal information
- Born: September 11, 1988 (age 38); Jefferson Hills, Pennsylvania, U.S.
- Listed height: 6 ft 4 in (1.93 m)
- Listed weight: 230 lb (104 kg)

Career information
- High school: Jefferson (Jefferson Hills)
- College: Pittsburgh (2007–2010)
- NFL draft: 2011: undrafted

Career history

Playing
- Chicago Bears (2011−2012); Tampa Bay Buccaneers (2013); Minnesota Vikings (2014)

Operations
- San Francisco 49ers (2016 - present); Scouting assistant (2016-2017); Area scout (2018-2021); National scout (2022-2023); Director of college scouting (2024-present)

Awards and highlights
- First-team All-Big East (2010); Second-team All-Big East (2009); PIAA champion; 2× WPIAL champion

Career NFL statistics
- Total tackles: 12
- Stats at Pro Football Reference

Dominic John DeCicco (born September 11, 1988) is an American professional football scout and former linebacker who is the director of college scouting for the San Francisco 49ers of the National Football League (NFL).

He was signed by the Chicago Bears as an undrafted free agent in 2011, and was also a member of the Tampa Bay Buccaneers and Minnesota Vikings. He played college football for the Pittsburgh Panthers.

== Early life ==
DeCicco went to Thomas Jefferson High School, where he played wide receiver, quarterback, safety, cornerback, and kick/punt returner. He was called one of the most diverse athletes in the state his senior year throwing for over 1,000 yards, rushing for over 1,000 yards, and also returning a kick and punt for a touchdown. He would go on to win one PIAA and two Western Pennsylvania Interscholastic Athletic League championships. DeCicco was also a four-year letterman in basketball and 1,000-point scorer.

College recruiting
Name	Hometown	School	Height	Weight	40^{‡}	Commit date
Dom DeCicco; Wide receiver	Jefferson Hills, Pennsylvania	Thomas Jefferson	6 ft 3 in (1.91 m)	196 lb (89 kg)	4.59	Jun 17, 2006
Dom DeCicco; Wide receiver	Recruit ratings: Rivals:					
Overall recruit ranking: Rivals: 21
‡ Refers to 40-yard dash; Note: In many cases, Scout, Rivals, 247Sports, On3, and ESPN may conflict in their listings of height, weight and 40 time.; In these cases, the average was taken. ESPN grades are on a 100-point scale.; Sources: "2007 Pittsburgh Football Commitment List". Rivals.; "2007 Team Ranking". Rivals.com.

== College career ==
DeCicco played for the Panthers as a strong safety. As a true freshman in 2007, DeCicco played in 10 games primarily on special teams, and garnered six tackles. In 2008, he played in all 13 games, while starting 11 at safety, recording 56 tackles and a team high four interceptions. In 2009, he was named to the second-team All-Big East team after having 88 tackles, three interceptions, and a forced fumble. He also was named Big East Defensive Player of the Week for week 8 against the USF Bulls, where he recorded 10 tackles. DeCicco ranked seventh among Big East defenders with 7.8 tackles per game.

== Professional career ==
=== Chicago Bears ===
DeCicco went undrafted in the 2011 NFL draft, and was signed by the Bears. He played in all 16 games, and recorded 12 special teams tackles, which ranks second on the team. In 2012, DeCicco filled in for Brian Urlacher at middle linebacker during OTAs while he was out with a knee injury. On August 29, DeCicco was released by Chicago. On December 4, DeCicco was brought back by the Bears on a two-year contract. On May 13, 2013, DeCicco was released.

=== Tampa Bay Buccaneers ===
On July 31, 2013, DeCicco was signed by the Tampa Bay Buccaneers.

=== Minnesota Vikings ===
DeCicco signed with the Minnesota Vikings in May 2014. He was waived/injured by the Vikings on August 18, 2014. He was placed on the team's injured reserve list on August 19, 2014.

== Post-playing career ==
In 2016, DeCicco was a scouting intern with the San Francisco 49ers before joining the organization as a scouting department assistant the following year.
