= Chilo Rachal =

American football player (born 1986)

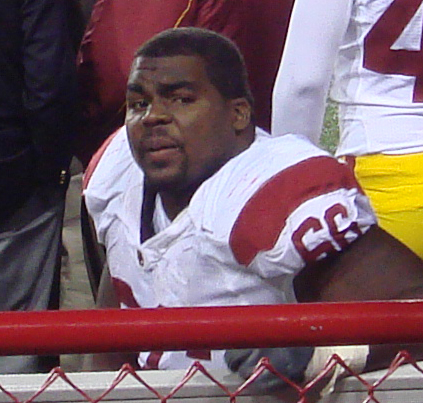
- Rachal with the USC Trojans in 2007

No. 62
- Position: Guard

Personal information
- Born: March 15, 1986 (age 40); Compton, California, U.S.
- Listed height: 6 ft 5 in (1.96 m)
- Listed weight: 323 lb (147 kg)

Career information
- High school: Dominguez (Compton)
- College: USC
- NFL draft: 2008: 2nd round, 39th overall pick

Career history
- San Francisco 49ers (2008–2011); Chicago Bears (2012); Arizona Cardinals (2013)*
- * Offseason or practice squad member only

Awards and highlights
- First-team All-Pac-10 (2007); Second-team All-Pac-10 (2006)

Career NFL statistics
- Games played: 64
- Games started: 46
- Stats at Pro Football Reference

Chilo Rachal (born March 15, 1986) is an American former professional football player who was a guard in the National Football League (NFL). He played college football for the USC Trojans and was selected by the San Francisco 49ers in the second round of the 2008 NFL draft.

== Early life ==
He played high school football at Dominguez High School in Compton, where he was a 2003 Super Prep and Prep Star All-American his senior year. Regarded as a four-star recruit by Rivals.com, Rachal was listed as the No. 12 offensive tackle prospect in the class of 2004.

== College career ==
Rachal redshirted his freshman year at offensive guard and tackle in the 2004 season. In the 2005 season he appeared in all 13 games as a backup offensive guard and on special teams. As a redshirt sophomore, he started all 12 games at right offensive guard in the 2006 season, earning a spot on the All-Pacific-10 Conference second-team.

For the 2007 season, the redshirt junior again started at right guard. Despite missing three games due to a sprained knee suffered against Washington, Rachal was named to the 2007 All-Pacific-10 Conference First-team Offense. At the end of the season, Rachal's father, Charles, mentioned that his son had told him he was declaring for the 2008 NFL draft due to family medical issues. The month following his father's comment, Rachal stated his 64-year-old father, who works in construction, had recently suffered two hernias, and has tendinitis in his knees and his mother had been diagnosed with an abdominal growth the size of a six-month-old child, though he was unclear whether it was benign or malignant. His mother had informed him of her condition after the 2007 regular season. The only underclassman at USC to leave that year, Rachal stated "I had to do what was best for my family."

== Professional career ==
Pre-draft measurables
| Height | Weight | 40-yard dash | 10-yard split | 20-yard split | 20-yard shuttle | Three-cone drill | Vertical jump | Broad jump | Bench press |
|---|---|---|---|---|---|---|---|---|---|
| 6 ft 5 in (1.96 m) | 315 lb (143 kg) | 5.16 s | 1.80 s | 3.01 s | 5.14 s | 8.01 s | 25 1/2 in (0.65 m) | 9 ft 0 in (2.74 m) | 28 reps |
All values from NFL Combine

=== San Francisco 49ers ===
Rachal was selected in the second round with the 39th overall pick by the San Francisco 49ers in the 2008 NFL draft.

Rachal was signed to a four-year deal.

Rachal started the last 6 games of the 2008 season, then started 15 of 16 games in 2009. Rachal started 14 of 15 games played in 2010. During the 2011 season, Rachal was assigned to second string behind starting Right Guard Adam Snyder, although he did start 3 games at the position.

=== Chicago Bears ===
On April 18, 2012, he signed a contract with the Chicago Bears to a one-year deal. It was announced on November 21, 2012 that Rachal had left the team for "personal reasons". He was placed on the reserve/left squad list. On November 22, Rachal was placed on reserve/non-football injury, and was ruled out for the remainder of the 2012 season.

=== Arizona Cardinals ===
On April 10, 2013 Rachal signed with the Arizona Cardinals. He was released on August 30, 2013.
