= 2011 Chicago Bears season =

American football league team season

- Owner: The McCaskey Family
- General manager: Jerry Angelo
- Head coach: Lovie Smith
- Home stadium: Soldier Field

Results
- Record: 8–8
- Division place: 3rd NFC North
- Playoffs: Did not qualify
- All-Pros: PR/KR Devin Hester (2nd team)
- Pro Bowlers: RB Matt Forte; OLB Lance Briggs; MLB Brian Urlacher; CB Charles Tillman; CB Corey Graham

Uniform
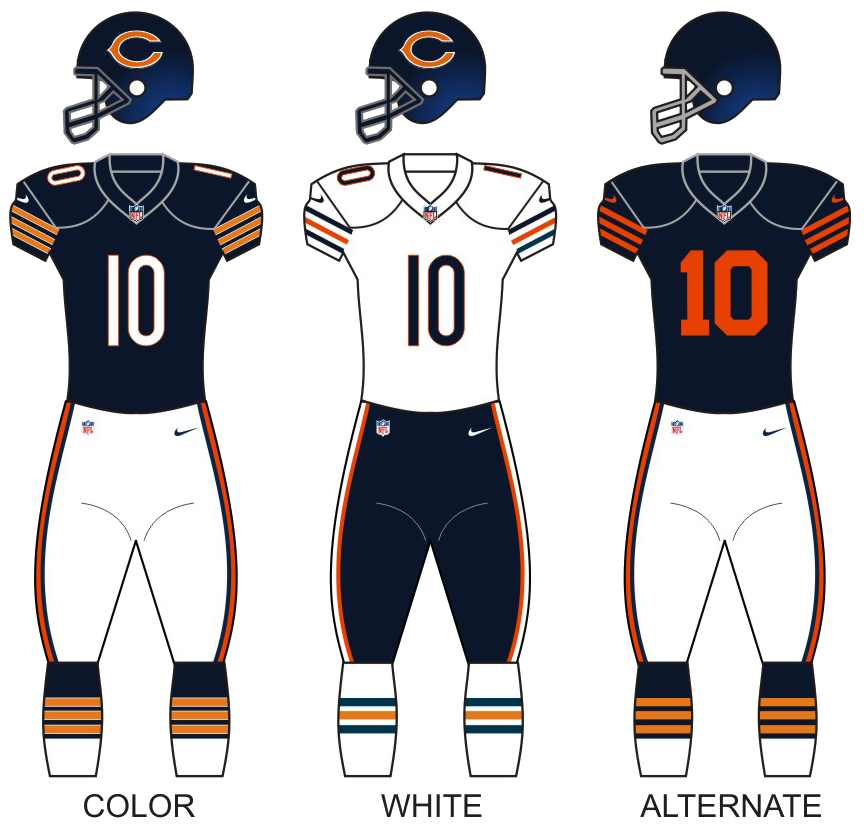

The 2011 season was the Chicago Bears' 92nd in the National Football League (NFL) and their eighth under head coach Lovie Smith. The defending NFC North champion Bears attempted a return to the playoffs after falling in the NFC Championship Game to their arch-rival Green Bay Packers in 2010. The Bears were scheduled to appear in the Pro Football Hall of Fame Game but due to the lockout, the game was cancelled. The Bears traveled to Wembley Stadium in London to take on the Tampa Bay Buccaneers in the NFL International Series and played the Green Bay Packers on Christmas Day evening in the only scheduled game on that day. Despite starting the season with a 7–3 record, starting quarterback Jay Cutler broke the thumb on his throwing hand and was forced to undergo season-ending surgery. After losing Cutler for the rest of the year, the Bears went 1–5, finishing the season with an 8–8 record and not qualifying for the playoffs. The season would begin somewhat of a lengthy playoff drought for the organization, as they would not return to the playoffs again until 2018.

== Offseason ==
After the 2010 season ended, the NFL entered its longest work stoppage in history. The lockout began after a failure to reach an agreement between the owners and the union in early March. Both sides agreed to extend the deadline another week. However, the talks broke down and the union officially decertified, after which a group of 10 players filed an antitrust lawsuit against the league. After months of failed negotiations, the two sides finally reached an agreement in late July. The owners announced on July 21 that it had approved a new collective bargaining agreement by a 31–0–1 margin (the Oakland Raiders abstained). On July 25, the players association's executive board voted to approve the new collective agreement and the players voted to ratify it on August 4. The delayed start to the season brought free agency and the opening of training camps to coincide. This gave clubs a short period of time to get a full roster signed before camp opened.

=== Coaching changes ===
- On January 31, defensive line coach Eric Washington left the team to take the same position with the Carolina Panthers.
- On February 3, the Bears hired Mike Phair as their new defensive line coach.

==== Acquisitions ====
- On July 29, the Bears signed former Dallas Cowboys WR Roy Williams, former Pittsburgh Steelers TE Matt Spaeth for a three-year deal, former Jacksonville Jaguars P Adam Podlesh for a five-year deal, and former New York Jets DE Vernon Gholston.
- On July 29, the Bears agreed to three-year contracts with DE Jake Laptad, TE Draylen Ross, RB Dan Dierking and T Mike Lamphear.
- On July 30, the Bears signed former Dallas Cowboys RB Marion Barber and former Houston Texans DT Amobi Okoye.
- On July 31, the Bears signed former Seattle Seahawks C Chris Spencer.
- On August 2, the Bears resigned TE Desmond Clark on a 1-year deal.
- On September 4, the Bears signed S Brandon Meriweather.

==== Departures ====
- On July 28, the Bears released TE Brandon Manumaleuna after a failed physical.
- On July 30, the Bears waived G Herman Johnson
- On August 1, the Bears waived P Richmond McGee and DT Sean Murnane.
- On August 2, the Bears waived S K.J. Gerard.
- On August 3, the Bears waived TE Draylen Ross.
- On August 8, the Bears waived RB Dan Dierking and QB Matt Gutierrez.
- On October 27, the Bears released S Chris Harris.
- On December 16, the Bears released WR Sam Hurd.

==== Free agents ====
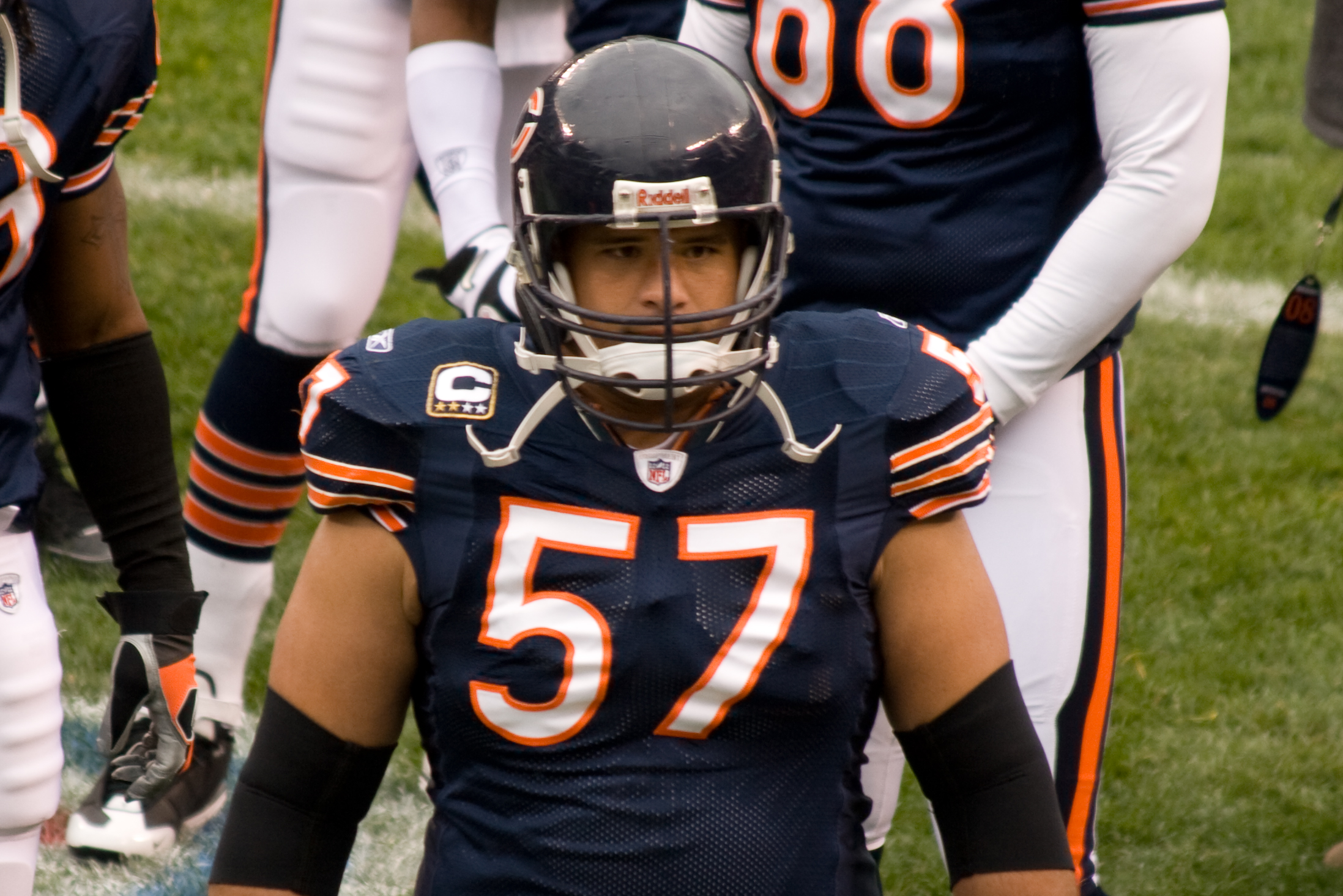
Bears did not come to terms with 13-year-veteran Olin Kreutz. Kreutz would go on and sign a 2-year deal with the New Orleans Saints.

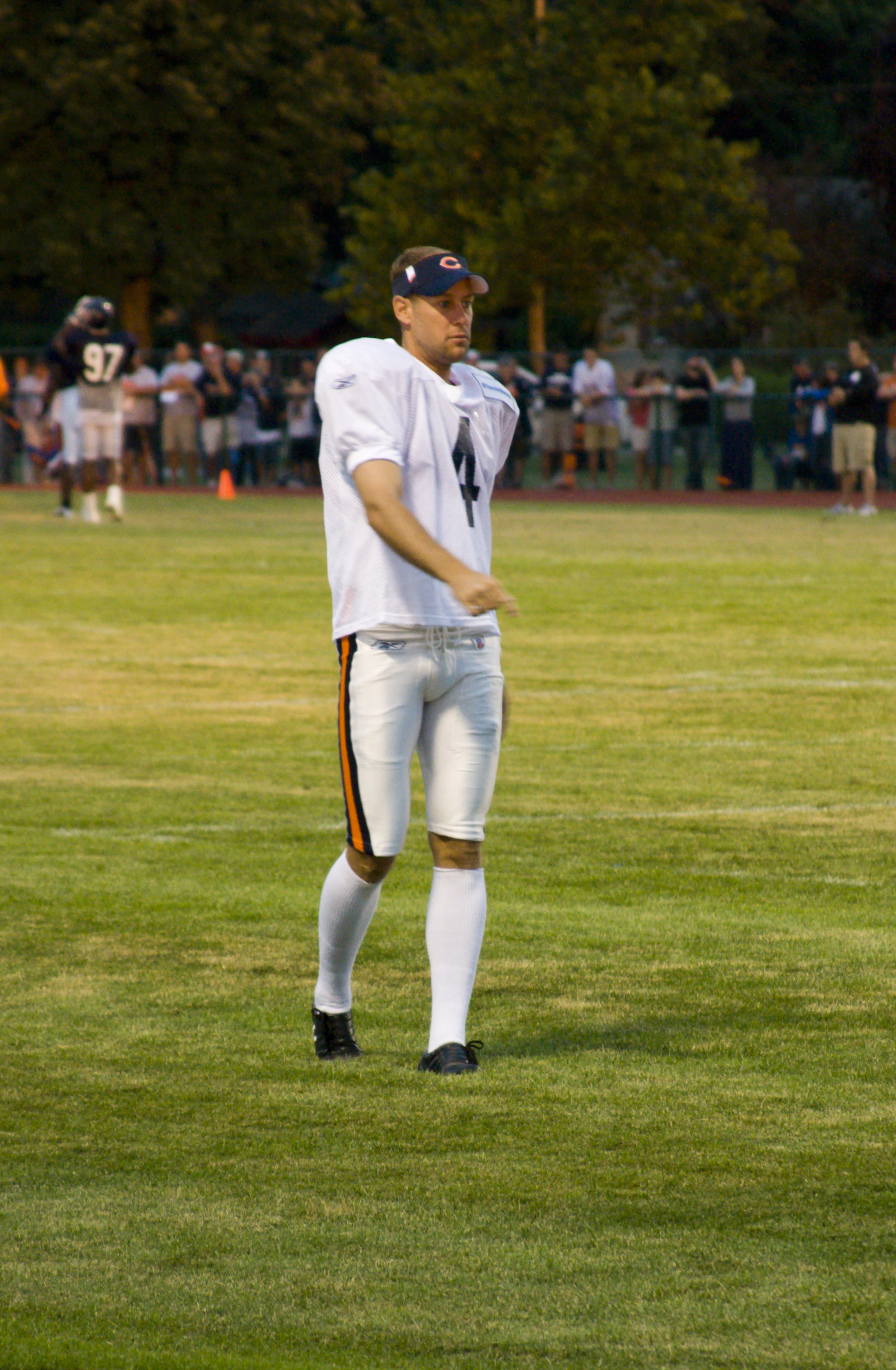
Brad Maynard left the Bears and signed with the Houston Texans.

| Position | Player | Free agency tag | Date signed | 2011 team |
|---|---|---|---|---|
| DT | Anthony Adams | UFA | July 29 | Chicago Bears |
| WR | Devin Aromashodu | UFA | July 26 | Minnesota Vikings |
| RB | Kahlil Bell | ERFA | July 29 | Chicago Bears |
| SS | Josh Bullocks | UFA | August 15 | Oakland Raiders |
| TE | Desmond Clark | UFA | August 2 | Chicago Bears |
| QB | Todd Collins | UFA | — | — |
| WR | Rashied Davis | UFA | July 27 | Detroit Lions |
| CB | Corey Graham | UFA | July 30 | Chicago Bears |
| QB | Caleb Hanie | RFA | July 29 | Chicago Bears |
| OLB | Brian Iwuh | UFA | July 31 | Chicago Bears |
| C | Olin Kreutz | UFA | August 5 | New Orleans Saints |
| SS | Danieal Manning | UFA | July 27 | Houston Texans |
| TE/FB | Brandon Manumaleuna | UFA | - | - |
| P | Brad Maynard | UFA | August 1 | Houston Texans |
| OLB | Nick Roach | UFA | July 29 | Chicago Bears |
| OLB | Pisa Tinoisamoa | UFA | — | — |
| G/C | Edwin Williams | ERFA | July 29 | Chicago Bears |
| OLB | Rod Wilson | UFA | — | — |
| RB | Garrett Wolfe | UFA | — | — |
RFA: Restricted free agent, UFA: Unrestricted free agent, ERFA: Exclusive rights free agent

==== Trades ====
- On July 28, the Bears traded TE Greg Olsen to the Carolina Panthers for a 2012 third-round draft pick.

==== Draft ====
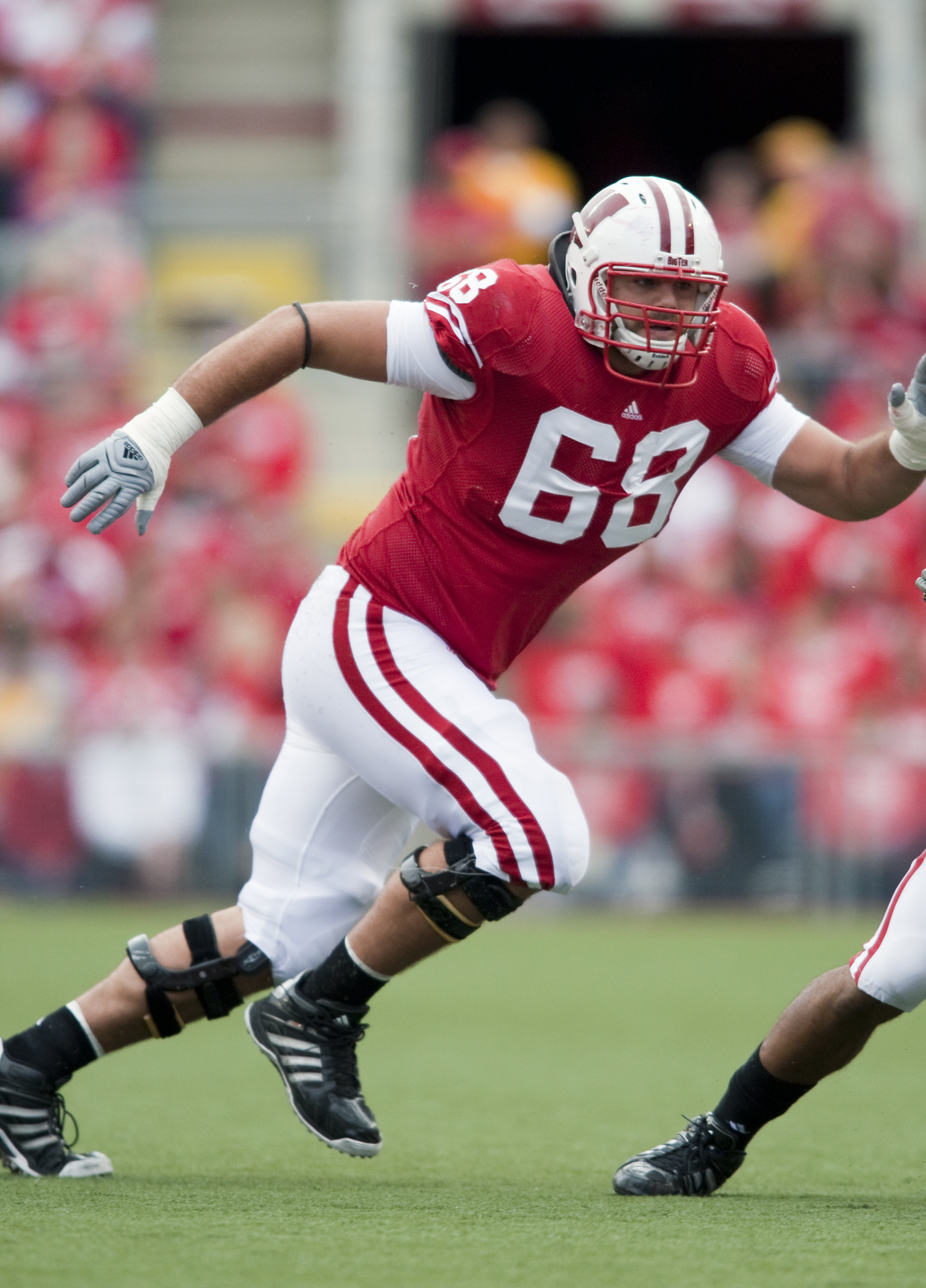
Gabe Carimi

2011 Chicago Bears draft
| Round | Pick | Player | Position | College | Notes |
| 1 | 29 | Gabe Carimi | OT | Wisconsin | |
| 2 | 53 | Stephen Paea | DT | Oregon State | |
| 3 | 93 | Chris Conte | FS | California | |
| 5 | 160 | Nathan Enderle | QB | Idaho | |
| 6 | 195 | J.T. Thomas | LB | West Virginia | |
Made roster † Pro Football Hall of Fame * Made at least one Pro Bowl during career

Draft Notes: Washington traded its second- (#53) round pick this selection to Chicago for Chicago's second- (#62) and fourth-round (#127) selections.
The Bears forfeited their seventh-round selection, due to the use of a seventh-round selection in the 2010 Supplemental draft.

==== Undrafted free agents ====
Following the end of the lockout, the Bears announced coming to terms with 26 undrafted free agents.

- Kris Adams, WR, (UTEP)
- Kyle Adams, TE, (Purdue)
- Mario Addison, DE, (Troy)
- Tanner Antle, LB, (Tulsa)
- Tressor Baptiste, LB, (Texas A&M–Kingsville)
- JC Brignone, C, (Mississippi State)
- Antareis Bryan, CB, (Baylor)
- Corbin Bryant, DL, (Northwestern)
- Travis Cobb, WR, (Arizona)
- Josh Davis, T, (Georgia)
- Dom DeCicco, LB, (Pittsburgh)
- Ricky Henry, G, (Nebraska)
- Mike Holmes, CB, (Syracuse)
- Robert Hughes, RB, (Notre Dame)
- Ryan Jones, CB, (NW Missouri State)
- Spencer Lanning, P, (South Carolina)
- Alex Linnenkohl, C, (Oregon State)
- Jordan Miller, DT, (Southern)
- Deron Minor, LB, (McNeese State)
- Sean Murnane, DT, (Central Michigan)
- Dane Sanzenbacher, WR, (Ohio State)
- Andre Smith, TE, (Virginia Tech)
- Winston Venable, S, (Boise State)
- Trevor Vittatoe, QB, (UTEP)
- Anthony Walters, S, (Delaware)
- Jimmy Young, WR, (TCU)

== Personnel ==
=== Staff ===
Chicago Bears 2011 staff
| Front office: Secretary of the board of directors – Virginia Halas McCaskey; Chairman – George McCaskey; President/CEO – Ted Phillips; General manager – Jerry Angelo; Director of player personnel – Tim Ruskell; Senior director of football administration/general counsel – Cliff Stein; Assistant director of pro personnel – Kevin Turks; Area scout – Chris Ballard; Area scout – Marty Barrett; Area scout – Rex Hogan; Area scout – Mark Sadowski; Head coaches: Head coach – Lovie Smith; Assistant head coach/defensive coordinator – Rod Marinelli; Offensive coaches: Offensive coordinator – Mike Martz; Quarterbacks – Shane Day; Running backs – Tim Spencer; Wide receivers – Darryl Drake; Tight ends – Mike DeBord; Offensive line – Mike Tice; Offensive quality control – Andrew Hayes-Stoker | Defensive coaches: Defensive line – Mike Phair; Linebackers – Bob Babich; Defensive backs – Jon Hoke; Assistant Defensive Backs (Safeties) – Gill Byrd; Defensive quality control – Mikal Smith; Special teams coaches: Special teams coordinator – Dave Toub; Assistant special teams – Kevin O'Dea; Strength and conditioning: Director of physical development – Rusty Jones; Strength and conditioning – Jim Arthur |

=== Final roster ===
2011 Chicago Bears roster
| Quarterbacks (QB): 10 Nathan Enderle; 12 Caleb Hanie; 15 Josh McCown; Running backs (RB): 25 Armando Allen; 24 Marion Barber; 32 Kahlil Bell; 44 Tyler Clutts FB; Wide receivers (WR): 80 Earl Bennett; 23 Devin Hester RS; 83 Max Komar; 18 Dane Sanzenbacher; 11 Roy Williams; Tight ends (TE): 87 Kellen Davis; 85 Andre Smith; 89 Matt Spaeth | Offensive linemen (OL): 63 Roberto Garza C; 64 Ricky Henry G; 79 Levi Horn T; 60 Lance Louis G/T; 68 Frank Omiyale T/G; 67 Chris Spencer G; 73 J'Marcus Webb T; 70 Edwin Williams G/C; 76 Mansfield Wrotto G; Defensive linemen (DL): 95 Anthony Adams DT; 94 Chauncey Davis DE; 71 Israel Idonije DE; 69 Henry Melton DT; 96 Jordan Miller DT; 91 Amobi Okoye DT; 92 Stephen Paea DT; 90 Julius Peppers DE; 75 Matt Toeaina DT; 98 Corey Wootton DE | Linebackers (LB): 55 Lance Briggs OLB; 58 Dom DeCicco MLB; 93 Thaddeus Gibson OLB; 53 Nick Roach OLB; 59 Patrick Trahan OLB; 54 Brian Urlacher MLB; 52 Jabara Williams OLB; Defensive backs (DB): 35 Zack Bowman CB; 21 Corey Graham CB; 26 Tim Jennings CB; 31 Brandon Meriweather FS; 30 D. J. Moore CB; 20 Craig Steltz SS; 33 Charles Tillman CB; 49 Winston Venable FS; 27 Major Wright SS; Special teams (ST): 9 Robbie Gould K; 45 Chris Massey LS; 8 Adam Podlesh P | Practice squad: 62 Perry Dorrestein T; 17 Johnathan Haggerty WR; 39 Robert Hughes RB; 19 Kevin Jurovich WR; 29 Joshua Moore CB; 84 Draylen Ross TE; 78 Reggie Stephens G/C; Reserve: 86 Kyle Adams TE (IR); 72 Gabe Carimi T (IR); 47 Chris Conte FS (IR); 6 Jay Cutler QB (IR); 22 Matt Forté RB (IR); 13 Johnny Knox WR (IR); 65 Patrick Mannelly LS (IR); 97 J. T. Thomas OLB (IR); 37 Anthony Walters FS (IR); 74 Chris Williams G (IR); Rookies in italics 53 active, 10 reserve, 7 practice squad |

=== Current depth chart ===
Current official depth chart announced by the club before the first game of the season against the Atlanta Falcons

Defense
https://www.pro-football-reference.com/teams/chi/2011_roster.htm

FS
Major Wright
Brandon Meriweather
Chris Conte

| WLB | MLB | SLB |
|---|---|---|
| ⋅ | Brian Urlacher | ⋅ |
| Brian Iwuh | Dom DeCicco | ⋅ |
| ⋅ | ⋅ | ⋅ |

SS
Craig Steltz
Winston Venable
⋅

CB
Tim Jennings
Zackary Bowman
D. J. Moore

| DE | DT | DT | DE |
|---|---|---|---|
| Julius Peppers | Anthony Adams | Henry Melton | Israel Idonije |
| Mario Addison | Matt Toeaina | Matt Toeaina | Corey Wootton |
| Nick Reed | Stephen Paea | Amobi Okoye | Nick Reed |

CB
Charles Tillman
Corey Graham
⋅

Offense
https://www.pro-football-reference.com/teams/chi/2011_roster.htm

WR
Roy Williams
Johnny Knox
Dane Sanzenbacher

| LT | LG | C | RG | RT |
|---|---|---|---|---|
| J'Marcus Webb | Chris Williams | Roberto Garza | Lance Louis | Gabe Carimi |
| Frank Omiyale | Edwin Williams | Chris Spencer | Edwin Williams | Frank Omiyale |
| ⋅ | ⋅ | ⋅ | ⋅ | ⋅ |

TE
Kellen Davis
Matt Spaeth
Kyle Adams

WR
Devin Hester
Earl Bennett
Sam Hurd

QB
Jay Cutler
Caleb Hanie
Nathan Enderle

RB
Matt Forte
Marion Barber
Kahlil Bell

FB
Tyler Clutts
⋅
⋅

Special teams
PK Robbie Gould
P Adam Podlesh
KR Devin Hester
PR Devin Hester
LS Patrick Mannelly
H Adam Podlesh

== Preseason ==
=== Training camp ===
The Bears held training camp once again at Olivet Nazarene University in Bourbonnais, Illinois. The club has held annual training camp activities at the university since 2002. The franchise opened up training camp with an expanded roster of 90 players. Over the next month players competed for spots on the final roster. By August 30, the club had cut down players from 90 to 75 after the third preseason game. It was though announced on August 20, the roster cuts would be changed from 75 to 80 players. The franchise then had to make another round of cuts at the conclusion of the fourth preseason game on September 3. The final roster consisted of 53 players. The Bears wrapped up training camp with a final public practice on August 19 before heading back to team headquarters in Lake Forest, Illinois. The practice marked the end of the team's three-week training camp in Bourbonnais.

==== Soldier Field turf issue ====
The club had scheduled an evening practice at Soldier Field in front of fans in an event called "Family Fest". However, the event was cancelled hours before the event was scheduled to begin due to the unsafe playing conditions at Soldier Field. This is not the first incident related to the playing surface at the stadium. Brian Urlacher and other players have called for the surface to be changed from natural grass to artificial FieldTurf. Chicago's mayor Rahm Emanuel has called on the Chicago Park District to find a permanent solution to the decades-old turf battle at the venue. However, Bears chairman George McCaskey has stated on record that the playing surface at Soldier Field will not change from grass to an artificial surface. McCaskey cited fewer injuries occur on natural grass and therefore believes the natural grass surface prolongs players' careers. He did admit a poorly maintained grass surface is unacceptable and promised the club will take a more active role in maintaining the playing surface so the field can be for home games. In Week 13, the field was resodded for the Bears-Chiefs game.

=== Schedule ===
Even though the league was in the midst of the lockout, the NFL announced the Bears' preseason schedule on April 12, 2011. The schedule contained the traditional four opponents and a fifth game to be played during the Pro Football Hall of Fame Class of 2011 induction weekend. The first scheduled preseason game for the Bears was to be the Pro Football Hall of Fame Game against the St. Louis Rams. However, with the lockout lingering into late July resulting in a delayed start to training camp, the NFL cancelled the game. The Bears won their first preseason game defeating the Buffalo Bills 10–3. The offensive line struggled in the game while giving up nine sacks over the course of the game. The Bears continued their preseason campaign with a visit to New Meadowlands Stadium in New Jersey to take on the New York Giants. The offensive line improved in the game by allowing only one sack of Cutler compared to the nine they gave up in a game last year. Cutler even joked about the experience by responding "Yeah, upright" to the question asked to him if this game against the Giants felt any different than last year's debacle. Cutler did express pleasure with the performance of the two young tackles, Webb and Carimi, when asked to assess their performance during preseason. The team did however fail to score twice inside the red zone in the 1st half against the Giants in a 41–13 loss. The game also saw the Bears had a punt blocked by the Giants and newly signed WR Roy Williams drop the first two passes thrown to him in his Bears career. In the third game, the Bears's first team offense showed more effectiveness than in previous games. The offensive starters racked up 239 yards in the first half. The team wrapped up the preseason season against the Browns by sitting out many key starters with instead going with various second-, third-, and even fourth-stringers in a very warm and humid night in Chicago. On September 4, a day after rosters were trimmed down to 53 men, the Bears signed former first-round draft pick and two-time Pro Bowler safety Brandon Meriweather, who was released by the New England Patriots the previous day. In response to adding Meriweather, the Bears released corner back Joshua Moore to keep the roster at 53 men.

| Week | Date | Kickoff (CDT) | Opponent | Results | | Game site | NFL.com GameBook | NFL.com Recap |
| Week | Date | Kickoff (CDT) | Opponent | Final score | Team record | Game site | NFL.com GameBook | NFL.com Recap |
|---|---|---|---|---|---|---|---|---|
| HOF | August 7 | 7:00 p.m. | vs. St. Louis Rams | Cancelled due to the 2011 NFL Lockout | | | | |
| 1 | August 13 | 7:00 p.m. | Buffalo Bills | W 10–3 | 1–0 | Soldier Field | Gamebook | Recap |
| 2 | August 22 | 7:00 p.m. | at New York Giants | L 13–41 | 1–1 | New Meadowlands Stadium | Gamebook | Recap |
| 3 | August 27 | 7:00 p.m. | at Tennessee Titans | L 13–14 | 1–2 | LP Field | Gamebook | Recap |
| 4 | September 1 | 7:00 p.m. | Cleveland Browns | W 24–14 | 2–2 | Soldier Field | Gamebook | Recap |

== Regular season ==
=== Schedule ===
The Bears' regular season schedule was announced on April 19, 2011. One day earlier (April 18), the NFL announced that the Bears would face the Tampa Bay Buccaneers in the International Series at Wembley Stadium in London, England, on October 23.

| Week | Date | Kickoff | Opponent | Results | | Game site | NFL.com GameBook | NFL.com Recap |
| Week | Date | Kickoff | Opponent | Final score | Team record | Game site | NFL.com GameBook | NFL.com Recap |
|---|---|---|---|---|---|---|---|---|
| 1 | September 11 | 12:00 p.m. | Atlanta Falcons§ | **W** 30–12 | 1–0 | Soldier Field | Gamebook | Recap |
| 2 | September 18 | 12:00 p.m. | at New Orleans Saints§ | **L** 13–30 | 1–1 | Louisiana Superdome | Gamebook | Recap |
| 3 | September 25 | 3:15 p.m. | **Green Bay Packers**† | **L** 17–27 | 1–2 | Soldier Field | Gamebook | Recap |
| 4 | October 2 | 12:00 p.m. | Carolina Panthers§ | **W** 34–29 | 2–2 | Soldier Field | Gamebook | Recap |
| 5 | October 10 | 7:30 p.m. | at **Detroit Lions**† | **L** 13–24 | 2–3 | Ford Field | Gamebook | Recap |
| 6 | October 16 | 7:20 p.m. | **Minnesota Vikings**† | **W** 39–10 | 3–3 | Soldier Field | Gamebook | Recap |
| 7 | October 23 | 12:00 p.m. | at Tampa Bay Buccaneers§ | **W** 24–18 | 4–3 | Wembley Stadium (London)^ | Gamebook | Recap |
| 8 | Bye | | | | | | | |
| 9 | November 7 | 7:30 p.m. | at Philadelphia Eagles§ | **W** 30–24 | 5–3 | Lincoln Financial Field | Gamebook | Recap |
| 10 | November 13 | 3:15 pm. | **Detroit Lions**† | **W** 37–13 | 6–3 | Soldier Field | Gamebook | Recap |
| 11 | November 20 | 3:15 p.m. | San Diego Chargers≈ | **W** 31–20 | 7–3 | Soldier Field | Gamebook | Recap |
| 12 | November 27 | 3:05 p.m. | at Oakland Raiders≈ | **L** 20–25 | 7–4 | O.co Coliseum | Gamebook | Recap |
| 13 | December 4 | 12:00 p.m. | Kansas City Chiefs≈ | **L** 3–10 | 7–5 | Soldier Field | Gamebook | Recap |
| 14 | December 11 | 3:05 p.m. | at Denver Broncos≈ | **L** 10–13 (OT) | 7–6 | Sports Authority Field at Mile High | Gamebook | Recap |
| 15 | December 18 | 12:00 p.m. | Seattle Seahawks§ | **L** 14–38 | 7–7 | Soldier Field | Gamebook | Recap |
| 16 | December 25‡ | 7:20 p.m. | at **Green Bay Packers**† | **L** 21–35 | 7–8 | Lambeau Field | Gamebook | Recap |
| 17 | January 1 | 12:00 p.m. | at **Minnesota Vikings**† | **W** 17–13 | 8–8 | Mall of America Field | Gamebook | Recap |
| | NOTES: All times are Central. Intra-division games are in **Bold** text. LEGEND: # Games played with color uniforms. # Games played with white uniforms. # Games played with alternate uniforms. – Light green background indicates a victory. – Light red background indicates a loss. † Games against division opponents. § Games against intra-conference non-division opponents. ≈ Games against inter-conference opponents.^ Red/White (Blue border) indicates the International Series game in London. ‡ Green/White (Red border) indicates a Christmas Day football game. | | | | | | | |

=== Standings ===
NFC North
| | W | L | T | PCT | DIV | CONF | PF | PA | STK |
|---|---|---|---|---|---|---|---|---|---|
| ^{(1)} Green Bay Packers | 15 | 1 | 0 | .938 | 6–0 | 12–0 | 560 | 359 | W2 |
| ^{(6)} Detroit Lions | 10 | 6 | 0 | .625 | 3–3 | 6–6 | 474 | 387 | L1 |
| Chicago Bears | 8 | 8 | 0 | .500 | 3–3 | 7–5 | 353 | 341 | W1 |
| Minnesota Vikings | 3 | 13 | 0 | .188 | 0–6 | 3–9 | 340 | 449 | L1 |

=== Game-by-game summaries ===
==== Week 1: vs. Atlanta Falcons ====
Week One: Atlanta Falcons at Chicago Bears – Game summary

| Quarter | 1 | 2 | 3 | 4 | Total |
|---|---|---|---|---|---|
| Falcons | 3 | 0 | 3 | 6 | **12** |
| **Bears** | 10 | 6 | 14 | 0 | **30** |

at Soldier Field, Chicago, Illinois

- Date: September 11, 2011
- Game time: 1:00 pm EDT/noon CDT
- Game weather: 78 °F (mostly cloudy)
- Game attendance: 62,115
- Referee: Ed Hochuli
- TV announcers (Fox): Kenny Albert, Daryl Johnston, and Tony Siragusa
- Gamebook

Game information

**First quarter**

- CHI – Robbie Gould 41 yd. Field Goal, **(CHI 3–0)**
- ATL – Matt Bryant 48 yd. Fieal Goal, **(Tie 3–3)**
- CHI – Matt Forte 56 yd. TD reception from Jay Cutler, R. Gould XP good, **(CHI 10–3)**

**Second quarter**

- CHI – Robbie Gould 23 yd. Field Goal, **(CHI 13–3)**
- CHI – Robbie Gould 26 yd. Field Goal, **(CHI 16–3)**

**Third quarter**

- ATL – Matt Bryant 25 yd. Field Goal, **(CHI 16–6)**
- CHI – Matt Spaeth 1 yd. TD reception from Jay Cutler, R. Gould XP good, **(CHI 23–6)**
- CHI – Matt Ryan fumble, Brian Urlacher 12 yd. TD recovered fumble return, R. Gould XP good, **(CHI 30–6)**

**Fourth quarter**

- ATL – Kroy Biermann 50 yd. INT return from Jay Cutler, Matt Ryan run up the middle, failed 2-pt attempt, **(CHI 30–12)**

**Top passers**

- ATL – Matt Ryan 31/47, 319 yards, INT
- CHI – Jay Cutler 22/32, 312 yards, 2 TDs, INT

**Top rushers**

- ATL – Michael Turner 10 attempts, 100 yards
- CHI – Matt Forte 16 attempts, 68 yards

**Top receivers**

- ATL – Tony Gonzalez 5 receptions, 72 yards
- CHI – Matt Forte 5 receptions, 90 yards, TD

**Top tacklers**

- ATL – Sean Weatherspoon 10 tackles, Pass Def
- CHI – Brian Urlacher 8 tackles (2 ast), INT, Fum Rec

The Bears opened up the season against the Atlanta Falcons at Soldier Field. The Falcons were the top-seeded NFC team in 2010, and were picked by many to be a Super Bowl contender. The Bears dominated the game against the Falcons, forcing 2 turnovers, and battering quarterback Matt Ryan for five sacks. Brian Urlacher recorded an interception and returned a fumble for a touchdown resulting in Urlacher being named the NFC Defensive Player of the Week. Defensive end Julius Peppers recorded two sacks and forced a fumble. Jay Cutler in his first game since the criticism of the NFC Championship Game against the Green Bay Packers, had a solid performance throwing for 312 yards and 2 touchdowns. Cutler did have a pass tipped in the fourth quarter that was returned for an interception by Kroy Biermann. Falcons running back Michael Turner finished with 100 yards on 10 carries, but 53 came on one dash and the low carry total is what mattered. Ryan was forced to throw 47 times as the Bears made the Falcons one-dimensional by getting out to a 16–3 halftime lead.

The victory places the Bears at 1–0.

==== Week 2: at New Orleans Saints ====
Week Two: Chicago Bears at New Orleans Saints – Game summary

| Quarter | 1 | 2 | 3 | 4 | Total |
|---|---|---|---|---|---|
| Bears | 7 | 3 | 3 | 0 | **13** |
| **Saints** | 3 | 13 | 7 | 7 | **30** |

at Louisiana Superdome, New Orleans, Louisiana

- Date: September 18, 2011
- Game time: 1:00 pm. EDT/12:00 pm. CDT
- Game weather: Played indoors (dome stadium)
- Game attendance: 73,019
- Referee: Walt Coleman
- TV announcers (Fox): Joe Buck, Troy Aikman, and Pam Oliver
- Gamebook

Game information

**First quarter**

- CHI – Dane Sanzenbacher 8 yd. TD reception from Jay Cutler, R.Gould XP Good, **(CHI 7–0)**
- NO – John Kasay 31 yd. Field Goal, **(CHI 7–3)**

**Second quarter**

- NO – Devery Henderson 79 yd. TD reception from Drew Brees, J.Kasay XP Good **(NO 10-7)**
- NO – John Kasay 29 yd. Field Goal, **(NO 13-7)**
- NO – John Kasay 53 yd. Field Goal, **(NO 16-7)**
- CHI – Robbie Gould 42 yd. Field Goal, **(NO 16-10)**

**Third quarter**

- CHI – Robbie Gould 38 yd. Field Goal **(NO 16-13)**
- NO – Robert Meachem 4 yd. TD reception from Drew Brees, J.Kasay XP Good **(NO 23-13)**

**Fourth quarter**

- NO – Darren Sproles 12 yd. TD reception from Drew Brees, J. Kasay XP Good **(NO 30-13)**

**Top passers**

- CHI – Jay Cutler 19/45, 244 yards, 1 TD
- NO – Drew Brees 26/37, 270 yards, 3 TDs

**Top rushers**

- CHI – Matt Forte 10 attempts, 49 yards
- NO – Mark Ingram II 14 attempts, 51 yards

**Top receivers**

- CHI – Matt Forte 10 receptions, 117 yards
- NO – Darren Sproles 8 receptions, 43 yards

**Top tacklers**

- CHI – Lance Briggs 10 tackles (1 ast)
- NO – Roland Harper 7 tackles, 2 sacks, 1 forced fumble

During the game, three Bears players fell to injury; Bears rookie Gabe Carimi was lost for the season with a knee injury, receiver Earl Bennett was lost for a few weeks, and safety Major Wright sustained a head injury after colliding with Saints tight end Jimmy Graham. The Bears were only able to muster one takeaway by cornerback Charles Tillman, who stripped the ball from Mark Ingram II and recovered at the Bears 9-yard line. Saints quarterback Drew Brees' 79-yard touchdown pass to Devery Henderson was the longest that the Bears allowed since 2008 against the Vikings. The Bears had also been able to convert only 2 of 12 third down attempts, compared to New Orleans, who converted 8 of 17.

With the loss, Chicago fell to 1–1.

In 2012, the Bears were considered as one of the possible targets of the Saints bounty program because of the injuries to Carimi and Wright, and Jay Cutler was sacked 6 times, and was kicked in the throat. Later in the game, Bears offensive tackle Frank Omiyale pulled a Saints defender off of Cutler after what Omiyale called "some dirty stuff"."

==== Week 3: vs. Green Bay Packers ====
Week Three: Green Bay Packers at Chicago Bears – Game summary

| Quarter | 1 | 2 | 3 | 4 | Total |
|---|---|---|---|---|---|
| **Packers** | 7 | 10 | 3 | 7 | **27** |
| Bears | 0 | 10 | 0 | 7 | **17** |

at Soldier Field, Chicago, Illinois

- Date: September 25, 2011
- Game time: 4:15 pm. EDT/3:15 pm. CDT
- Game weather: 56 °F, Clear
- Game attendance: 62,339
- Referee: Mike Carey
- TV announcers (Fox): Joe Buck, Troy Aikman, and Pam Oliver
- Gamebook

Game information

**First quarter**

- GB – Jermichael Finley 6 yd. TD reception from Aaron Rodgers, M.Crosby XP Good **(GB 7–0)**

**Second quarter**

- GB – Jermichael Finley 7 yd. TD reception from Aaron Rodgers, M.Crosby XP Good, **(GB 14–0)**
- CHI – Dane Sanzenbacher 4 yd. TD reception from Jay Cutler, R. Gould XP Good, **(GB 14–7)**
- GB – Mason Crosby 37 yd. Field Goal, **(GB 17–7)**
- CHI – Robbie Gould 25 yd. Field Goal, **(GB 17–10)**

**Third quarter**

- GB – Mason Crosby 28 yd. Field Goal, **(GB 20–10)**

**Fourth quarter**

- GB – Jermichael Finley 10 yd. TD reception from Aaron Rodgers, M. Crosby XP Good, **(GB 27–10)**
- CHI – Kellen Davis 32 yd. TD reception from Jay Cutler, R. Gould XP Good, **(GB 27–17)**

**Top passers**

- GB – Aaron Rodgers 28/38, 297 yards, 3 TDs, INT
- CHI – Jay Cutler 21/37, 302 yards, 2 TDs, 2 INTs

**Top rushers**

- GB – Ryan Grant 17 attempts, 92 yards
- CHI – Jay Cutler 3 attempts, 11 yards

**Top receivers**

- GB – Greg Jennings 9 receptions, 119 yards
- CHI – Johnny Knox 4 receptions, 84 yards

**Top tacklers**

- GB – Morgan Burnett 6 tackles (1 ast), 2 pass def, 2 INTs
- CHI – Lance Briggs 14 tackles (4 ast), forced fum

Against their hated rivals, the Bears seemed lost for much of the game, allowing Aaron Rodgers to throw three touchdown passes to tight end Jermichael Finley, and the Bears running game was only able to collect 13 yards. Though Jay Cutler threw for 302 yards, two touchdowns, and a 78.9 passer rating, he was also intercepted twice by Morgan Burnett, and was sacked three times. After the Packers led 14–0 in the first quarter, Cutler would find rookie Dane Sanzenbacher on a 4-yard touchdown pass. After Mason Crosby made a field goal, the Bears would score on Robbie Gould's 25-yard field goal. The Packers would then score ten more points. After Cutler was intercepted, Lance Briggs would strip James Starks, and Julius Peppers would recover the loose ball. Cutler would then hit Kellen Davis on a 32-yard touchdown pass, but would fail to score for the rest of the game. The Bears would have narrowed the score to three points on a trick play, but was nullified by a penalty. On a punt late in the game, Devin Hester drifted to the left with blockers covering him, giving them the impression that Hester will return, but the punt was actually heading towards Johnny Knox, who returned the punt 89 yards for a touchdown. However, the play would be nullified after cornerback Corey Graham was penalized for holding.

The loss gave the Bears a 1–2 record.

==== Week 4: vs. Carolina Panthers ====
Week Four: Carolina Panthers at Chicago Bears – Game summary

| Quarter | 1 | 2 | 3 | 4 | Total |
|---|---|---|---|---|---|
| Panthers | 3 | 17 | 0 | 9 | **29** |
| **Bears** | 10 | 14 | 0 | 10 | **34** |

at Soldier Field, Chicago, Illinois

- Date: October 2, 2011
- Game time: 1:00 pm. EDT/12:00 pm. CDT
- Game weather: 60 °F, Sunny
- Game attendance: 62,135
- Referee: Terry McAulay
- TV announcers (Fox): Thom Brennaman, Brian Billick, and Laura Okmin
- Gamebook

Game information

**First quarter**

- CAR – Olindo Mare 29 yd. Field Goal, **(CAR 3–0)**
- CHI – Robbie Gould 20 yd. Field Goal, **(Tie 3–3)**
- CHI – D.J. Moore 20 yd. INT return for TD, R. Gould XP Good, **(CHI 10–3)**

**Second quarter**

- CAR – Cam Newton 1 yd. TD run, O. Mare XP Good, **(Tie 10–10)**
- CHI – Matt Forte 17 yd. TD run, R. Gould XP Good, **(CHI 17–10)**
- CHI – Devin Hester 69 yd. punt return for TD, R. Gould XP Good, **(CHI 24–10)**
- CAR – Cam Newton 2 yd. TD run, R. Gould XP Good, **(CHI 24–17)**
- CAR – Olindo Mare 39 yd. Field Goal, **(CHI 24–20)**

**Third quarter**

**Fourth quarter**

- CAR – Olindo Mare 38 yd. Field Goal, **(CHI 24–23)**
- CHI – Robbie Gould 24 yd. Field Goal, **(CHI 27–23)**
- CHI – Marion Barber 3 yd. TD run, **(CHI 34–23)**
- CAR – Greg Olsen 3 yd. TD reception from Cam Newton, 2 pt. failed, **(CHI 34–29)**

**Top passers**

- CAR – Cam Newton 27/46, 374 yards, 1 TD, 1 INT
- CHI – Jay Cutler 9/17, 102 yards, 1 INT

**Top rushers**

- CAR – DeAngelo Williams 10 attempts, 82 yards
- CHI – Matt Forte 25 attempts, 205 yards, 1 TD

**Top receivers**

- CAR – Steve Smith 8 receptions, 181 yards
- CHI – Johnny Knox 3 receptions, 48 yards

**Top tacklers**

- CAR – Dan Connor 8 tackles (2 ast)
- CHI – Brian Urlacher 8 tackles

Against former defensive coordinator Ron Rivera and tight end Greg Olsen, the Bears scored touchdowns on all three phases (offense, defense, special teams). Matt Forte, who was only able to record two yards the week before, recorded 205 yards against Carolina, as well as a 17-yard touchdown run. Though the Bears defense was able to keep Carolina from converting only 2 of 12 third down attempts, and D. J. Moore was able to pick off Cam Newton, the defense did not record a sack, and allowed 547 yards. Devin Hester also returned a punt 69 yards for a touchdown, which broke the all-time punt return touchdown record. Hester would also return a kickoff 73 yards. However, Newton completed 27 of 46 passes for 374 yards, 1 touchdown and an 83.1 passer rating while also rushing for 35 yards and two TDs on eight carries, and the score was 34–29 late in the game when Newton connected with Olsen with :04 left in the game. The Panthers attempted to kick an onside kick, but Hester would recover the kick and give Chicago the victory.

The victory gave Chicago a 2–2 record.

==== Week 5: at Detroit Lions ====
Week Five: Chicago Bears at Detroit Lions – Game summary

| Quarter | 1 | 2 | 3 | 4 | Total |
|---|---|---|---|---|---|
| Bears | 0 | 10 | 0 | 3 | **13** |
| **Lions** | 0 | 7 | 14 | 3 | **24** |

at Ford Field, Detroit, Michigan

- Date: October 10, 2011
- Game time: 8:30 pm. EDT/7:30 pm. CDT
- Game weather: Played indoors (dome stadium)
- Game attendance: 67,861
- Referee: Clete Blakeman
- TV announcers (ESPN): Mike Tirico, Ron Jaworski, Jon Gruden, Suzy Kolber, and Rachel Nichols
- Gamebook

Game information

**First quarter**

- No scoring plays

**Second quarter**

- DET – Calvin Johnson 73 yd. TD reception from Matthew Stafford, J.Hanson XP Good **(DET 7–0)**
- CHI – Robbie Gould 44 yd. Field Goal, **(DET 7–3)**
- CHI – Kellen Davis 9 yd. TD reception from Jay Cutler, J.Hanson XP Good **(CHI 10–7)**

**Third quarter**

- DET – Brandon Pettigrew 18 yd. TD reception from Matthew Stafford, J.Hanson XP Good **(DET 14–10)**
- DET – Jahvid Best 88 yd. TD run, J. Hanson XP Good, **(DET 21–10)**

**Fourth quarter**

- CHI – Robbie Gould 49 yd. Field Goal, **(DET 21–13)**
- DET – Jason Hanson 31 yd. Field Goal, **(DET 24–13)**

**Top passers**

- CHI – Jay Cutler – 28/38, 249 yards, 1 touchdown
- DET – Matthew Stafford – 19/26, 219 yards, 2 touchdowns, 1 interception

**Top rushers**

- CHI – Matt Forté – 22 carries, 116 yards
- DET – Jahvid Best – 12 carries, 163 yards, 1 touchdown

**Top receivers**

- CHI – Dane Sanzenbacher – 6 receptions, 64 yards
- DET – Calvin Johnson – 5 receptions, 130 yards, 1 touchdown

**Top tacklers**

- CHI – Lance Briggs – 5 tackles, 4 assists
- DET – DeAndre Levy – 9 tackles, 4 assists

Coming off their home win over the Panthers, the Bears flew to Ford Field for a Week 5 Monday Night duel with their NFC North foe, the Detroit Lions. After a scoreless first quarter, Chicago trailed in the second quarter with Lions quarterback Matthew Stafford completing a 73-yard touchdown pass to wide receiver Calvin Johnson. The Bears would answer with a 44-yard field goal from kicker Robbie Gould, followed by quarterback Jay Cutler finding tight end Kellen Davis on a 9-yard touchdown pass.

Detroit responded in the third quarter with Stafford completing an 18-yard touchdown pass to tight end Brandon Pettigrew, followed by running back Jahvid Best getting an 88-yard touchdown run. Chicago tried to rally in the fourth quarter with a 49-yard field goal from Gould, but the Lions pulled away with kicker Jason Hanson nailing a 31-yard field goal.

With the loss, the Bears fell to 2–3.

==== Week 6: vs. Minnesota Vikings ====
Week Six: Minnesota Vikings at Chicago Bears – Game summary

| Quarter | 1 | 2 | 3 | 4 | Total |
|---|---|---|---|---|---|
| Vikings | 0 | 3 | 7 | 0 | **10** |
| **Bears** | 16 | 10 | 10 | 3 | **39** |

at Soldier Field, Chicago, Illinois

- Date: October 16, 2011
- Game time: 8:20 pm. EDT/7:20 pm. CDT
- Game weather: 56 °F, Clear, winds gusting to 20mph
- Game attendance: 62,322
- Referee: Walt Anderson
- TV announcers (NBC): Al Michaels, Cris Collinsworth, and Michele Tafoya
- Gamebook

Game information

**First quarter**

- CHI – Devin Hester 48 yd. pass from Jay Cutler (Robbie Gould kick) **CHI 7–0**
- CHI – Donovan McNabb sacked in end zone by Stephan Paea for a Safety. **CHI 9–0**
- CHI – Marion Barber 3 yd. run (Gould kick) **CHI 16–0**

**Second quarter**

- MIN – Ryan Longwell 37 yd. Field Goal **CHI 16–3**
- CHI – Dane Sanzenbacher 13 yd. pass from Jay Cutler (Robbie Gould kick) **CHI 23–3**
- CHI – Robbie Gould 51 yd. Field Goal **CHI 26–3**

**Third quarter**

- MIN – Adrian Peterson 4 yd. run (Ryan Longwell kick) **CHI 26–10**
- CHI – Devin Hester 98 yd. kickoff return (Robbie Gould kick) **CHI 33–10**
- CHI – Robbie Gould 26 yd. Field Goal **CHI 36–10**

**Fourth quarter**

- CHI – Robbie Gould 22 yd. Field Goal **CHI 39–10**

**Top passers**

- MIN – Dovovan McNabb – 19/24, 177 yards
- CHI – Jay Cutler – 21/31, 267 yards, 2 touchdowns

**Top rushers**

- MIN – Adrian Peterson – 12 carries, 39 yards
- CHI – Matt Forte – 17 carries, 87 yards

**Top receivers**

- MIN – Percy Harvin – 7 receptions, 78 yards
- CHI – Matt Forte – 6 receptions, 36 yards

**Top tacklers**

- MIN – Erin Henderson – 8 tackles
- CHI – Charles Tillman – 10 tackles, 1 assist

On Sunday night, the Bears would once again score on all three phases. The offensive line improved, allowing Jay Cutler to be sacked only once. Cutler would complete 21 of 31 passes for 267 yards with two touchdowns and a 115.9 passer rating. On the Bears opening possession, Cutler would fire a 48-yard touchdown pass to Devin Hester; it was the first time that the Bears scored a touchdown on the opening drive. Making his NFL debut, Stephen Paea sacked Donovan McNabb in the end zone for a safety, increasing the score to 9–0. Marion Barber would then score on a 3-yard run. Ryan Longwell would then kick a 37-yard field goal to make the score 16–3, but Cutler's 18-yard pass to Dane Sanzenbacher and Robbie Gould's 51-yard field goal increased the lead to 26–3. In the second half, Vikings defensive end Jared Allen would then force a fumble, and Adrian Peterson would then score, making the score 26–10, but Devin Hester would then return a kickoff 98 yards for a touchdown to increase the lead to 33–10. Gould would then kick two field goals to end the game at 39–10. The Bears defense would record five sacks, including two by Julius Peppers, who started the game despite being listed as "Doubtful" due to a sprained knee. The defense would limit Peterson to just 39 yards, the lowest he recorded against the Bears.

With the win, the Bears improved to 3–3.

==== Week 7: at Tampa Bay Buccaneers (London, England) ====
Week Seven: Chicago Bears at Tampa Bay Buccaneers – Game summary

| Quarter | 1 | 2 | 3 | 4 | Total |
|---|---|---|---|---|---|
| **Bears** | 7 | 7 | 7 | 3 | **24** |
| Buccaneers | 2 | 3 | 0 | 13 | **18** |

at Wembley Stadium, London, England (NFL International Series)

- Date: October 23, 2011
- Game time: 6:00 p.m. BST/12:00 pm. CDT
- Game weather: 62 °F (Clear)
- Game attendance: 76,981
- Referee: Tony Corrente
- TV announcers (Fox): Kenny Albert, Daryl Johnston, and Tony Siragusa
- Gamebook

Game information

**First quarter**

- CHI – Matt Forte 32 yd. run (Robbie Gould kick) **CHI 7–0**
- TB – Ronde Barber tackled Matt Forte in the end zone for a safety **CHI 7–2**

**Second quarter**

- CHI – Roy Williams 25 yd. pass from Jay Cutler (Robbie Gould kick) **CHI 14–2**
- TB – Connor Barth 33 yd. Field Goal **CHI 14–5**

**Third quarter**

- CHI – Marion Barber 12 yd. run (Robbie Gould kick) **CHI 21–5**

**Fourth quarter**

- TB – Kellen Winslow 2 yd. pass from Josh Freeman (Pass Failed) **CHI 21–11**
- TB – Dezmon Briscoe 24 yd. pass from Josh Freeman (Connor Barth kick) **CHI 21–18**
- CHI – Robbie Gould 25 yd. Field Goal **CHI 24–18**

**Top passers**

- CHI – Cutler – 17/32, 226 yards, 1 touchdown, 2 interceptions
- TB – Josh Freeman – 29/51, 264 yards, 2 touchdowns, 4 interceptions

**Top rushers**

- CHI – Matt Forté – 25 rushes, 145 yards, 1 touchdown
- TB – Kregg Lumpkin – 8 rushes, 15 yards

**Top receivers**

- CHI – Roy Williams – 4 receptions, 59 yards, 1 touchdown
- TB – Mike Williams – 6 receptions, 75 yards

**Top tacklers**

- CHI – Charles Tillman – 9 tackles, 1 assist
- TB – Sean Jones – 6 tackles, 1 assist

In the team's first international game since the 1997 American Bowl, the Bears traveled to London to take on the Buccaneers. The Bears struck first when Matt Forte scored on a 32-yard touchdown. However, Tampa Bay would then strike back when Ronde Barber tackled Forte in his own end zone for a safety. Jay Cutler would then hit Roy Williams for a 25-yard touchdown, and Tampa Bay would then score on a Connor Barth field goal. In the third quarter, Marion Barber would score on a 12-yard run. In the fourth quarter, Tampa Bay would attempt to fight back and scored 2 touchdowns, but a Robbie Gould field goal and a D. J. Moore interception would then put the game away.

Chicago improved to 4–3 with the win.

==== Week 8: Bye ====
After the game across the Atlantic, the Bears would have a bye week upon their return to the United States.

==== Week 9: at Philadelphia Eagles ====
Week Nine: Chicago Bears at Philadelphia Eagles – Game summary

| Quarter | 1 | 2 | 3 | 4 | Total |
|---|---|---|---|---|---|
| **Bears** | 7 | 10 | 3 | 10 | **30** |
| Eagles | 0 | 10 | 14 | 0 | **24** |

at Lincoln Financial Field, Philadelphia, Pennsylvania

- Date: November 7, 2011
- Game time: 8:30 pm. EST/7:30 pm. CST
- Game weather: 51 °F, Clear
- Game attendance: 69,144
- Referee: Scott Green
- TV announcers (ESPN): Mike Tirico, Ron Jaworski, Jon Gruden, Suzy Kolber, and Rachel Nichols
- Gamebook

Game information

**First quarter**

- CHI – Matt Spaeth 5 yd. TD reception from Jay Cutler, R. Gould XP Good **(CHI 7–0)**

**Second quarter**

- CHI – Robbie Gould 51 yd. Field Goal, **(CHI 10–0)**
- PHI – Alex Henery 47 yd. Field Goal, **(CHI 10–3)**
- PHI – Matt Forté fumble, Brian Rolle 22 yd. TD recovered fumble return, A. Henery XP good, **(Tied 10–10)**
- CHI – Marion Barber 2 yd. TD run, R. Gould XP Good, **(CHI 17–10)**

**Third quarter**

- PHI – Ronnie Brown 4 yd. TD run, A. Henery XP Good, **(Tied 17–17)**
- PHI – LeSean McCoy 33 yd. TD run, A. Henery XP Good, **(PHI 24–17)**
- CHI – Robbie Gould 38 yd. Field Goal, **(PHI 24–20)**

**Fourth quarter**

- CHI – Earl Bennett 5 yd. TD reception from Jay Cutler, R. Gould XP Good **(CHI 27–24)**
- CHI – Robbie Gould 22 yd. Field Goal, **(CHI 30–24)**

**Top passers**

- CHI – Jay Cutler – 18/32, 208 yards, 2 touchdowns
- PHI – Michael Vick – 21/38, 213 yards, 1 interception

**Top rushers**

- CHI – Matt Forte – 24 carries, 113 yards
- PHI – LeSean McCoy – 16 carries, 71 yards

**Top receivers**

- CHI – Earl Bennett – 5 receptions, 95 yards, 1 touchdown
- PHI – Brent Celek – 7 receptions, 60 yards

**Top tacklers**

- CHI – Brian Urlacher – 10 tackles, 1 assist
- PHI – Kurt Coleman – 10 tackles, 2 assist

Coming off their bye week, the Bears flew to Lincoln Financial Field for a Week 9 Monday night duel with the Philadelphia Eagles. Chicago delivered the game's opening punch in the first quarter as quarterback Jay Cutler found tight end Matt Spaeth on a 5-yard touchdown pass. The Bears added onto their lead in the second quarter with a 51-yard field goal from kicker Robbie Gould. The Eagles would answer with kicker Alex Henery getting a 47-yard field goal, followed by linebacker Brian Rolle returned a fumble 22 yards for a touchdown, yet Chicago closed out the half with a 2-yard touchdown run from running back Marion Barber.

Philadelphia took the lead in the third quarter with running back Ronnie Brown getting a 4-yard touchdown run, followed by running back LeSean McCoy getting a 33-yard touchdown run. The Bears replied with a 38-yard field goal from Gould. Afterwards, Chicago regained the lead in the fourth quarter with Cutler connecting with wide receiver Earl Bennett on a 5-yard touchdown pass. On the Eagles possession, punter Chas Henry attempted to pass to Colt Anderson on a fake punt, which fell short. Gould would then make a 22-yard field goal. The Eagles tried to rally, but the Bears defense would hold on for the victory.

With the win, Chicago improved to 5–3.

==== Week 10: vs. Detroit Lions ====
Week Ten: Detroit Lions at Chicago Bears – Game summary

| Quarter | 1 | 2 | 3 | 4 | Total |
|---|---|---|---|---|---|
| Lions | 0 | 6 | 0 | 7 | **13** |
| **Bears** | 10 | 10 | 17 | 0 | **37** |

at Soldier Field, Chicago, Illinois

- Date: November 13, 2011
- Game time: 4:15 pm. EST/3:15 pm. CST
- Game weather: 69 °F, Cloudy
- Game attendance: 62,396
- Referee: Pete Morelli
- TV announcers (Fox): Thom Brennaman, Brian Billick, and Laura Okmin
- Gamebook

Game information

**First quarter**

- CHI – Matt Forte 6-yard run (Robbie Gould kick), Bears 7–0,, **Drive: 4 plays, 30 yards, 1:41.**
- CHI – Robbie Gould 43-yard field goal, Bears 10–0, **Drive: 8 plays, 37 yards, 3:36.**

**Second quarter**

- CHI – Robbie Gould 35-yard field goal, Bears 13–0, **Drive: 8 plays, 35 yards, 2:44.**
- CHI – Devin Hester 82-yard punt return (Robbie Gould kick), Bears 20–0, **Drive: 1 play, 82 yards, 0:00.**
- DET – Jason Hanson 29-yard field goal, Bears 20–3, **Drive: 4 plays, 9 yards, 0:49.**
- DET – Jason Hanson 35-yard field goal, Bears 20–6, **Drive: 14 plays, 48 yards, 5:25.**

**Third quarter**

- CHI – Major Wright 24-yard interception return (Robbie Gould kick), Bears 27–6, **Drive: 1 play 24 yards, 0:00.**
- CHI – Charles Tillman 44-yard interception return (Robbie Gould kick), Bears 34–6, **Drive: 1 play, 44 yards, 0:00.**
- CHI – Robbie Gould 50-yard field goal, Bears 37–6, **Drive: 6 plays, 47 yards, 2;33.**

**Fourth quarter**

- DET – Tony Scheffler 10-yard pass from Matthew Stafford (Jason Hanson kick), Bears 37–13, **Drive: 8 plays, 56 yards, 2:00.**

**Top passers**

- DET – Matthew Stafford – 33/63, 323 yards, 1 touchdown, 4 interceptions
- CHI – Jay Cutler – 9/19, 123 yards

**Top rushers**

- DET – Maurice Morris – 10 carries, 44 yards
- CHI – Matt Forte – 18 carries, 64 yards, 1 touchdown

**Top receivers**

- DET – Nate Burleson – 8 receptions, 33 yards
- CHI – Earl Bennett – 6 receptions, 81 yards

**Top tacklers**

- DET – Stephen Tulloch – 7 tackles
- CHI – Tim Jennings – 9 tackles, 1 assist

The Bears made up for their Week 5 loss against the Lions by forcing six turnovers, and led 20–6 at halftime. Early in the third quarter, Major Wright and Charles Tillman returned interceptions of 24 and 44 yards, respectively, for touchdowns in a 1:52 span. This game was the first time the Bears returned two interceptions for touchdowns since the 1993 season, where they defeated Brett Favre's Packers 30–17. Tillman had a career game against Lions receiver Calvin Johnson, who led the NFL in touchdown receptions at the time. Tillman allowed Johnson to catch only seven out of 19 passes that were thrown his way.

During the game, Bears nickelback D. J. Moore was ejected from the game after fighting with Lions quarterback Matthew Stafford, who had pulled Moore down by his helmet during Tim Jennings' interception return. The incident would eventually lead to a brawl between the two teams, and chanting from the crowd.

Chicago became 6–3 with the win.

==== Week 11: vs. San Diego Chargers ====
Week Eleven: San Diego Chargers at Chicago Bears – Game summary

| Quarter | 1 | 2 | 3 | 4 | Total |
|---|---|---|---|---|---|
| Chargers | 3 | 7 | 7 | 3 | **20** |
| **Bears** | 3 | 14 | 14 | 0 | **31** |

at Soldier Field, Chicago, Illinois

- Date: November 20, 2011
- Game time: 4:15 pm. EST/3:15 pm. CST
- Game weather: 42 °F, Cloudy, winds gusting to 20 mph
- Game attendance: 62,344
- Referee: Jeff Triplette
- TV announcers (CBS): Jim Nantz and Phil Simms
- Gamebook

Game information

**First quarter**

**Second quarter**

**Third quarter**

**Fourth quarter**

**Top passers**

- SD –
- CHI –

**Top rushers**

- SD –
- CHI –

**Top receivers**

- SD –
- CHI –

**Top tacklers**

- SD –
- CHI –

The Chargers struck first on a Nick Novak 28-yard field goal, but Robbie Gould's 42-yard field goal and Marion Barber's 1-yard touchdown run gave the Bears a 10–3 lead. Philip Rivers would then find Antonio Gates on an 8-yard pass, but Jay Cutler and Kellen Davis would connect to give the Bears the lead in the second quarter. In the third quarter, Rivers would find Vincent Jackson to tie the game, but Cutler would then score two more touchdowns on a one-yard run, and Charles Tillman would force a Ryan Mathews fumble. Cutler would then throw a 24-yard touchdown pass to Johnny Knox to make the score 31–17. Novak would then score on a 48-yard field goal to end the game with a Bears 31–20 victory. Cutler passed for two touchdowns and ran for a third. He also completed 18 of 31 attempts for 286 yards and a 97.0 passer rating.

However, Cutler would break his thumb when he was attempting to tackle Antoine Cason early in the fourth quarter, who had intercepted his pass. The injury would end his season.

Despite Cutler's injury, the Bears would improve to 7–3.

==== Week 12: at Oakland Raiders ====
Week Twelve: Chicago Bears at Oakland Raiders – Game summary

| Quarter | 1 | 2 | 3 | 4 | Total |
|---|---|---|---|---|---|
| Bears | 0 | 7 | 0 | 13 | **20** |
| **Raiders** | 6 | 6 | 6 | 7 | **25** |

at O.co Coliseum, Oakland, California

- Date: November 27, 2011
- Game time: 3:05 pm. CST/1:05 p.m. PST
- Game weather: 59 °F (Partly Cloudy)
- Game attendance: 59,244
- Referee: Ron Winter
- TV announcers (Fox): Kenny Albert, Daryl Johnston, and Tony Siragusa
- Gamebook

Game information

**First quarter**

- OAK – Sebastian Janikowski 40 yd. Field Goal **(OAK 3–0)**
- OAK – Sebastian Janikowski 47 yd. Field Goal **(OAK 6–0)**

**Second quarter**

- CHI – Johnny Knox 29 yd. pass from Caleb Hanie (Robbie Gould kick) **(CHI 7–6)**
- OAK – Sebastian Janikowski 42 yd. Field Goal **(OAK 9–7)**
- OAK – Sebastian Janikowski 19 yd. Field Goal **OAK 12–7**

**Third quarter**

- OAK – Sebastian Janikowski 37 yd. Field Goal **(OAK 15–7)**
- OAK – Sebastian Janikowski 44 yd. Field Goal **(OAK 18–7)**

**Fourth quarter**

- CHI – Robbie Gould 50 yd. Field Goal **(OAK 18–10)**
- CHI – Robbie Gould 53 yd. Field Goal **(OAK 18–13)**
- OAK – Michael Bush 3 yd. run (Sebastian Janikowski kick) **(OAK 25–13)**
- CHI – Kellen Davis 9 yd. pass from Caleb Hanie (Robbie Gould kick) **(OAK 25–20)**

**Top passers**

- CHI – Caleb Hanie – 18/36, 254 yards, 2 touchdowns, 3 interceptions
- OAK – Carson Palmer – 21/37, 301 yards, 1 interception

**Top rushers**

- CHI – Marion Barber – 10 carries, 63 yards
- OAK – Michael Bush – 24 carries, 69 yards

**Top receivers**

- CHI – Matt Forte – 6 receptions, 25 yards
- OAK – Marcel Reece – 5 receptions, 92 yards

**Top tacklers**

- CHI – Lance Briggs – 6 tackles
- OAK – Tyvon Branch – 8 tackles

In Caleb Hanie's first NFL start, he threw three interceptions in the first half, but was able to rally by completing 18 of 36 passes for 254 yards, two touchdowns and a 56.9 passer rating. However, Raiders kicker Sebastian Janikowski's six field goals would put the game away. Late in the fourth quarter, with the Bears down 25–20, Hanie attempted to rally the Bears from their own 4-yard line. When the Bears reached their own 46-yard line with less than ten seconds in the game, Hanie dropped back and looked around as if he was going to throw before spiking, drawing an intentional grounding penalty. Since intentional grounding penalties have a ten-second runoff, the game ended in defeat for Chicago.

The loss would put Chicago at 7–4.

==== Week 13: vs. Kansas City Chiefs ====
Week Thirteen: Kansas City Chiefs at Chicago Bears – Game summary

| Quarter | 1 | 2 | 3 | 4 | Total |
|---|---|---|---|---|---|
| **Chiefs** | 0 | 7 | 3 | 0 | **10** |
| Bears | 0 | 3 | 0 | 0 | **3** |

at Soldier Field, Chicago, Illinois

- Date: December 4, 2011
- Game time: 1:00 pm. EST/12:00 pm. CST
- Game weather: 46 °F, Cloudy, wind gusts to 26 mph, temps to mid 40s
- Game attendance: 61,973
- Referee: Jerome Boger
- TV announcers (CBS): Kevin Harlan and Solomon Wilcots
- Gamebook

Game information

**First quarter**

- No scoring plays

**Second quarter**

- CHI – Robbie Gould 32 yd. Field Goal **(CHI 3–0)**
- KC – Dexter McCluster 38 yd. pass from Tyler Palko **(KC 7–3)**

**Third quarter**

- KC – Ryan Succop 21 yd. Field Goal **(KC 10–3)**

**Fourth quarter**

- No scoring plays

**Top passers**

- KC – Tyler Palko – 17/30, 157 yards, 1 touchdown
- CHI – Caleb Hanie – 11/24, 133 yards, 3 interceptions

**Top rushers**

- KC – Dexter McCluster – 9 carries, 61 yards
- CHI – Marion Barber – 14 carries, 44 yards

**Top receivers**

- KC – Steve Breaston – 5 receptions, 41 yards
- CHI – Johnny Knox – 5 receptions, 53 yards

**Top tacklers**

- KC – Derrick Johnson – 7 tackles, 1 assist
- CHI – Craig Steltz – 9 tackles, 1 assist

The Bears ended up losing another player for the season when they lost Matt Forté after he sprained his knee. The Chiefs would score the game-winning touchdown on a Hail Mary when Tyler Palko's pass was batted down by Brian Urlacher and Chris Conte, but the ball would land in Dexter McCluster's hands.

The Bears fell to 7–5 with the loss.

==== Week 14: at Denver Broncos ====
Week Fourteen: Chicago Bears at Denver Broncos – Game summary

| Quarter | 1 | 2 | 3 | 4 | OT | Total |
|---|---|---|---|---|---|---|
| Bears | 0 | 0 | 7 | 3 | 0 | **10** |
| **Broncos** | 0 | 0 | 0 | 10 | 3 | **13** |

at Sports Authority Field at Mile High, Denver, Colorado

- Date: December 11, 2011
- Game time: 3:05 pm. CST/2:05 p.m. MST
- Game weather: 50 °F (Sunny)
- Game attendance: 76,487
- Referee: Carl Cheffers
- TV announcers (Fox): Kenny Albert, Daryl Johnston, and Tony Siragusa
- Gamebook

Game information

**First quarter**

- No scoring plays

**Second quarter**

- No scoring plays

**Third quarter**

- CHI – Marion Barber 9 yd. run (Robbie Gould kick) **(CHI 7–0)**

**Fourth quarter**

- CHI – Robbie Gould 57 yd. Field Goal **(CHI 10–0)**
- DEN – Demaryius Thomas 10 yd. pass from Tim Tebow (Matt Prater kick) **(CHI 10–7)**
- DEN – Matt Prater 59 yd. Field Goal **(Tied 10–10)**

**Overtime**

- DEN – Matt Prater 51 yd. Field Goal **(DEN 13–10)**

**Top passers**

- CHI – Caleb Hanie – 12/19, 115 yards
- DEN – Tim Tebow – 21/40, 236 yards, 1 touchdown, 1 interception

**Top rushers**

- CHI – Marion Barber – 27 carries, 108 yards
- DEN – Tim Tebow – 12 carries, 49 yards

**Top receivers**

- CHI – Kahlil Bell – 5 receptions, 24 yards
- DEN – Demaryius Thomas – 7 receptions, 78 yards, 1 touchdown

**Top tacklers**

- CHI – Brian Urlacher – 10 tackles, 1 assist
- DEN – D.J. Williams – 9 tackles

Against Tim Tebow and the Broncos, the two teams would be in a 0–0 deadlock in the first half, though the Broncos would nearly score in the second quarter on a 28-yard field goal, which would then be blocked by Julius Peppers. The Bears would then score 10 points on Marion Barber's 9-yard touchdown run, and Robbie Gould's team record-breaking 57-yard field goal, but Tebow's touchdown pass to Demaryius Thomas and Matt Prater's 59-yard field goal would tie the game. Barber would commit two costly mistakes during the late portion of the game. In the fourth quarter, Barber would run out of bounds with 1:55 left, and Barber would also fumble in overtime. The Broncos would then move downfield and kick a game-winning field goal.

The overtime loss dropped Chicago to 7–6.

==== Week 15: vs. Seattle Seahawks ====
Week Fifteen: Seattle Seahawks at Chicago Bears – Game summary

| Quarter | 1 | 2 | 3 | 4 | Total |
|---|---|---|---|---|---|
| **Seahawks** | 7 | 0 | 17 | 14 | **38** |
| Bears | 7 | 7 | 0 | 0 | **14** |

at Soldier Field, Chicago, Illinois

- Date: December 18, 2011
- Game time: 1:00 pm. EST/12:00 pm. CST
- Game weather: 39 °F (Sunny)
- Game attendance: 61,542
- Referee: Ed Hochuli
- TV announcers (Fox): Chris Myers, Tim Ryan and Jaime Maggio
- Gamebook

Game information

**First quarter**

- SEA – Marshawn Lynch 2 yd. run (Steven Hauschka kick) **(SEA 7–0)**
- CHI – Israel Idonije fumble recovery in the end zone (Robbie Gould kick) **(Tied 7–7)**

**Second quarter**

- CHI – Kahlil Bell 25 yd. pass from Caleb Hanie (Robbie Gould kick) **(CHI 14–7)**

**Third quarter**

- SEA – Marshawn Lynch 3 yd. run (Steven Hauschka kick) **(Tied 14–14)**
- SEA – Red Bryant 20 yd. interception return (Steven Hauschka kick) **(SEA 21–14)**
- SEA – Steven Hauschka 33 yd. Field Goal **(SEA 24–14)**

**Fourth quarter**

- SEA – Michael Robinson 2 yd. pass from Tarvaris Jackson (Steven Hauschka kick) **(SEA 31–14)**
- SEA – Brandon Browner 42 yd. interception return (Steven Hauschka kick) **(SEA 38–14)**

**Top passers**

- SEA – Tarvaris Jackson – 19/31, 227 yards, 1 touchdown
- CHI – Caleb Hanie – 10/23, 111 yards, 1 touchdown, 3 interceptions

**Top rushers**

- SEA – Justin Forsett – 20 carries, 42 yards
- CHI – Kahlil Bell – 15 carries, 65 yards

**Top receivers**

- SEA – Golden Tate – 4 receptions, 61 yards
- CHI – Kahlil Bell – 5 receptions, 43 yards

**Top tacklers**

- SEA – K.J. Wright – 8 tackles
- CHI – Craig Steltz – 5 tackles, 3 assists

The Bears received a scare in the Seahawks game when wide receiver Johnny Knox bent his back awkwardly after taking a hit on Seahawk's defensive end Anthony Hargrove while trying to recover his own fumble. Knox remained down for nearly ten minutes leaving Bears fans in shock. The major hit ended the receiver's season, and he was placed on injured reserve. In the game, the Bears would lead 14–7 in the first half, but would end in disaster when they were outscored 31–0 in the second half including two defensive touchdowns. First, Hanie threw a pass that was intercepted by the Seahawks Red Bryant and he returned it 20 yards for a touchdown. The second one which Hanie threw was picked off by Brandon Browner and he returned it 42 yards for a touchdown. Hanie would then be benched late in the game and replaced by Josh McCown.

The loss gave the Bears a .500 winning percentage and a 7–7 record.

==== Week 16: at Green Bay Packers (Christmas Day) ====
Week Sixteen: Chicago Bears at Green Bay Packers – Game summary

| Quarter | 1 | 2 | 3 | 4 | Total |
|---|---|---|---|---|---|
| Bears | 0 | 3 | 7 | 11 | **21** |
| **Packers** | 7 | 7 | 14 | 7 | **35** |

at Lambeau Field, Green Bay, Wisconsin

- Date: December 25, 2011 (**Christmas Day**)
- Game time: 8:20 pm. EST/7:20 pm. CST
- Game weather: 37 °F (Cloudy)
- Game attendance: 70,574
- Referee: John Parry
- TV announcers (NBC): Al Michaels, Cris Collinsworth, and Michele Tafoya
- Gamebook

Game information

**First quarter**

- GB – Jermichael Finley 2 yd. pass from Aaron Rodgers (Mason Crosby kick) **(GB 7–0)**

**Second quarter**

- CHI – Robbie Gould 35 yd. Field Goal **(GB 7–3)**
- GB – James Jones 2 yd. pass from Aaron Rodgers (Mason Crosby kick)**(GB 14–3)**

**Third quarter**

- CHI – Edwin Williams fumble recovery in the end zone (Robbie Gould kick)**(GB 14–10)**
- GB – Jordy Nelson 55 yd. pass from Aaron Rodgers (Mason Crosby kick) **(GB 21–10)**
- GB – James Jones 7 yd. pass from Aaron Rodgers (Mason Crosby kick) **(GB 28–10)**

**Fourth quarter**

- GB – Jordy Nelson 2 yd. pass from Aaron Rodgers (Mason Crosby kick) **(GB 35–10)**
- CHI – Kellen Davis 1 yd. pass from Josh McCown (Josh McCown run)**(GB 35–18)**
- CHI – Robbie Gould 30 yd. Field Goal **(GB 35–21)**

**Top passers**

- CHI – Josh McCown – 19/28, 242 yards, 1 TD, 2 INT
- GB – Aaron Rodgers – 21/29, 283 yards, 5 TD

**Top rushers**

- CHI – Kahlil Bell – 23 rushes, 121 yards
- GB – Ryan Grant – 8 rushes, 44 yards

**Top receivers**

- CHI – Roy Williams – 6 receptions, 81 yards
- GB – Jordy Nelson – 6 receptions, 115 yards, 2 TD

**Top tacklers**

- CHI – Craig Steltz – 5 tackles
- GB – Desmond Bishop – 9 tackles

After backup quarterback Caleb Hanie showing poor performance in his starting of 4 games that were all losses, the Bears decided to start third-string quarterback Josh McCown who was recently signed after being waived by the 49ers. McCown would complete 19 of 28 passes for 242 yards with one touchdown, two interceptions and a 76.8 passer rating, and wasn't sacked. He also rushed for 38 yards on eight carries. Kahlil Bell, filling in for Forte and Barber, would record 121 yards on 23 carries and caught four passes for 38 yards.

The Packers would eliminate the Bears from playoff contention with a score of 35–21, and the Bears would fall to 7–8.

==== Week 17: at Minnesota Vikings ====
Week Seventeen: Chicago Bears at Minnesota Vikings – Game summary

| Quarter | 1 | 2 | 3 | 4 | Total |
|---|---|---|---|---|---|
| **Bears** | 0 | 14 | 0 | 3 | **17** |
| Vikings | 10 | 3 | 0 | 0 | **13** |

at Mall of America Field at Hubert H. Humphrey Metrodome, Minneapolis, Minnesota

- Date: January 1, 2012
- Game time: 1:00 pm. EST/12:00 pm. CST
- Game weather: Played indoors (dome stadium)
- Game attendance: 62,867
- Referee: Mike Carey
- TV announcers (Fox): Kenny Albert, Daryl Johnston, Tony Siragusa
- Gamebook

Game information

**First quarter**

- MIN – Ryan Longwell 26 yd. Field Goal **(MIN 3–0)**
- MIN – Percy Havin 5 yd. run (Ryan Longwell kick) **(MIN 10–0)**

**Second quarter**

- CHI – Roy Williams 22 yd. pass from Josh McCown (Robbie Gould kick) **(MIN 10–7)**
- CHI – Charles Tillman 22 yd. interception return (Robbie Gould kick) **(CHI 14–10)**
- MIN – Ryan Longwell 26 yd. Field Goal **(CHI 14–13)**

**Third quarter**

- No scoring plays

**Fourth quarter**

- CHI – Robbie Gould 27 yd. Field Goal **(CHI 17–13)**

**Top passers**

- CHI – Josh McCown – 15/25, 160 yards, 1 touchdown, 1 interception
- MIN – Joe Webb 17/32, 200 yards, 2 interceptions

**Top rushers**

- CHI – Kahlil Bell – 17 carries, 54 yards
- MIN – Toby Gerhart – 15 carries, 67 yards

**Top receivers**

- CHI – Kahlil Bell – 5 receptions, 28 yards
- MIN – Percy Harvin – 10 receptions, 115 yards

**Top tacklers**

- CHI – Brian Urlacher – 7 tackles, 3 assists
- MIN – Chad Greenway – 6 tackles, 2 assists

The Bears finally snapped their five-game losing streak on New Year's Day by beating the Vikings 17–13. The Bears also suffered through another devastating injury when linebacker Brian Urlacher sprained his left MCL after colliding into safety Major Wright. Vikings defensive end Jared Allen came close to breaking Michael Strahan's record for most sacks in a season, sacking Josh McCown 3½ times, and was ½ sacks away from breaking the record, but McCown was able to prevent Allen from breaking the record. The Vikings scored on first on Ryan Longwell's 26-yard field goal and Percy Harvin's touchdown run, both stemming from fumbles by Earl Bennett and Kahlil Bell. However, the Bears would then score on McCown's 22-yard pass to Roy Williams and Charles Tillman's interception return for a touchdown after intercepting Christian Ponder. After Julius Peppers blocked Longwell's field goal, Cedric Griffin would intercept McCown, but the Vikings would then botch the snap on a field goal attempt. D. J. Moore would then close the game out by intercepting Joe Webb, ending the Bears season at 8–8.

== Statistical leaders ==
=== Regular season ===
| | Player(s) | Value | NFL Rank | NFC Rank |
|---|---|---|---|---|
| Passing yards | Jay Cutler | 2,319 yards | 19th | 9th |
| Passing touchdowns | Jay Cutler | 13 TDs | T-15th | T-7th |
| Rushing yards | Matt Forte | 985 yards | 3rd | 2nd |
| Rushing touchdowns | Marion Barber | 5 TDs | T-13th | 7th |
| Receiving yards | Johnny Knox | 622 yards | 30th | 17th |
| Receiving touchdowns | Kellen Davis | 4 TDs | T-32nd | T-17th |
| Points | Robbie Gould | 100 | T-5th | T-4th |
| Kickoff Return Yards | Devin Hester | 519 yards | 16th | 9th |
| Punt return Yards | Devin Hester | 368 yards | 4th | 2nd |
| Tackles | Lance Briggs | 80 | T-18th | T-11th |
| Sacks | Julius Peppers | 8.0 | T-11th | T-6th |
| Interceptions | Brian Urlacher; D.J. Moore; Major Wright; Corey Graham | 3 INTs | T-18th | T-11th |

stats are updated through the end of Week 12.

=== Statistical league rankings ===
- Total Offense (YPG): 339.0 (16th)
- Passing (YPG): 217.0 (20th)
- Rushing (YPG): 121.8 (10th)
- Points (PPG): 26.2 (6th)
- Total Defense (YPG): 369.1 (23rd)
- Passing (YPG): 270.5 (30th)
- Rushing (YPG): 98.6 (8th)
- Points (PPG): 21.2 (16th)

Stats will be added after Week 12.

== Awards and records ==
=== Awards ===
==== Weekly awards ====
- MLB Brian Urlacher was named NFC Defensive player of the week for games played during Week 1.
- RB Matt Forte was named FedEx Ground Player of the Week(Running Backs)for games played during Week 4.
- WR Devin Hester was named NFC Special Teams player of the week for games played during Week 4.
- WR Devin Hester was named NFC Special Teams player of the week for games played during Week 6.
- OLB Lance Briggs was named NFC Defensive player of the week for games played during Week 7.
- WR Devin Hester was named NFC Special Teams player of the week for games played during Week 10.

==== Monthly awards ====
- WR Devin Hester was named the NFC Special Teams Player of the Month for games played during the month of October.
- DE Julius Peppers was named the NFC Defensive Player of the Month for games played during the month of November.

=== Records ===
==== Individual ====
===== Career =====
- WR Devin Hester set the Bears and NFL record for Most career punt returns for touchdowns with 11 on his 69-yard punt return touchdown during Week 4 against Carolina Panthers at Soldier Field.
