= Chris Spencer (center) =

American football player (born 1982)

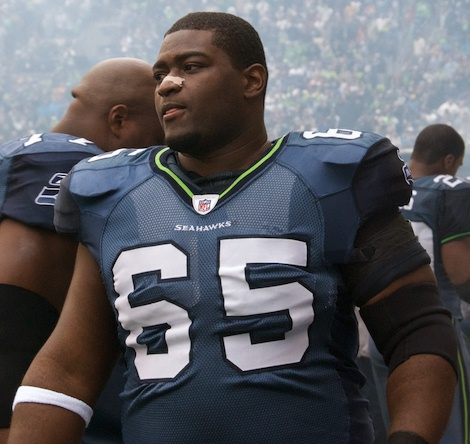
- Spencer on the sidelines during the November 2, 2008, game against the Eagles

No. 65, 67, 60
- Position: Center

Personal information
- Born: March 28, 1982 (age 44); Madison, Mississippi, U.S.
- Listed height: 6 ft 3 in (1.91 m)
- Listed weight: 309 lb (140 kg)

Career information
- High school: Madison Central
- College: Mississippi (2001–2004)
- NFL draft: 2005: 1st round, 26th overall pick

Career history
- Seattle Seahawks (2005–2010); Chicago Bears (2011–2012); Tennessee Titans (2013–2014)

Career NFL statistics
- Games played: 137
- Games started: 95
- Fumble recoveries: 1
- Stats at Pro Football Reference

Christopher Clark Spencer (born March 28, 1982) is an American former professional football player who was a center in the National Football League (NFL). He was selected with the 26th overall pick in the first round of the 2005 NFL draft out of the University of Mississippi by the Seattle Seahawks. He also played for the Chicago Bears and Tennessee Titans.

== Early life ==
Spencer was born in Madison, Mississippi. He was part of the nationally ranked and undefeated Madison Central High School in the Madison football team in 2000, which contained 5 current NFL players. After his prep career, he was one of the most highly touted offensive line recruits in the Southeast. His home ties led him to choose the University of Mississippi, where he played alongside Madison Central teammates Doug Buckles and Mike Espy (of the Washington Redskins). During the 2003 season, the Ole Miss Rebels had an impressive campaign, winning 10 games concluded with a Cotton Bowl Classic victory over Oklahoma State.

== Professional career ==
=== 2005 NFL draft ===
Spencer was considered one of the best centers available in the 2005 NFL draft, along with Jason Brown. He was projected a late second-round pick, and was eventually selected 26th overall in the first round.

Pre-draft measurables
Height	Weight	Arm length	Hand span	40-yard dash	10-yard split	20-yard split	20-yard shuttle	Three-cone drill	Vertical jump	Broad jump	Bench press
6 ft 2 7/8 in (1.90 m)	309 lb (140 kg)	33 1/2 in (0.85 m)	10 7/8 in (0.28 m)	5.21 s	1.81 s	3.04 s	4.61 s	8.07 s	32 in (0.81 m)	8 ft 9 in (2.67 m)	26 reps
All values from NFL Combine

=== Seattle Seahawks ===
In his first season with the Seattle Seahawks, he played 7 games. In the 2006 season, he played in all 16 games for Seattle, starting 13 of them, most at the guard position, next to longtime Seattle center Robbie Tobeck. Spencer succeeded Tobeck as starting center for the 2007 season, as Tobeck had retired at the end of 2006.

=== Chicago Bears ===
On July 31, 2011, he was signed by the Chicago Bears to replace the outgoing Olin Kreutz. During the 2011 season, Spencer alternated between center and guard with Roberto Garza. In Week 4 against the Carolina Panthers, Spencer subbed for Lance Louis, but would himself go out of the game with a hand injury.

On November 22, 2012, Spencer was named as the Bears starting guard after Chilo Rachal was placed on the reserve/non-football injury list.

=== Tennessee Titans ===
On April 1, 2013, Spencer signed with the Tennessee Titans. On April 2, 2014, Spencer re-signed with the Titans on a new one-year deal.

== Personal life ==
In 2006, he married Coastal Carolina Elite volleyball player Katherine Jensen.
