= Brian Iwuh =

American football player (born 1984)

No. 52, 59
- Position: Linebacker

Personal information
- Born: March 8, 1984 (age 42); Houston, Texas, U.S.
- Listed height: 6 ft 0 in (1.83 m)
- Listed weight: 239 lb (108 kg)

Career information
- High school: Worthing (Houston)
- College: Colorado
- NFL draft: 2006: undrafted

Career history
- Jacksonville Jaguars (2006–2009); Chicago Bears (2010–2011); Denver Broncos (2011)

Awards and highlights
- 2× Second-team All-Big 12 (2004, 2005)

Career NFL statistics
- Total tackles: 115
- Sacks: 1
- Forced fumbles: 2
- Fumble recoveries: 1
- Stats at Pro Football Reference

Brian Iwuh (born March 8, 1984) is an American former professional football player who was a linebacker for six seasons in the National Football League (NFL). After playing college football for Colorado, he was signed by the Jacksonville Jaguars as an undrafted free agent in 2006. He played for the Jaguars for four seasons, the Chicago Bears for two seasons, and the Denver Broncos in the 2011–12 NFL playoffs.

== Early life ==
Iwuh played high school football at Worthing High School in Houston, Texas. He earned All-League honors for three straight years. He also lettered in track, basketball and swimming.

== College career ==
Iwuh played college football at Colorado. During his senior year, he earned All-Big 12 Conference honors. He finished his college career with 216 tackles, 23 sacks and five interceptions.

== Professional career ==
=== Jacksonville Jaguars ===
Iwuh was signed by the Jacksonville Jaguars as an undrafted free agent in 2006. He was released on April 26, 2010.

=== Chicago Bears ===
Iwuh signed with the Chicago Bears on May 24, 2010. He was waived on November 29, 2011.

=== Denver Broncos ===
Iwuh signed with the Denver Broncos on January 3, 2012.

== NFL career statistics ==
Legend
**Bold**	Career high

=== Regular season ===
Year	Team	Games		Tackles					Interceptions					Fumbles			
Year	Team	GP	GS	Cmb	Solo	Ast	Sck	TFL	Int	Yds	TD	Lng	PD	FF	FR	Yds	TD
2006	JAX	12	0	13	10	3	0.0	0	0	0	0	0	0	0	0	0	0
2007	JAX	**16**	1	**31**	**24**	**7**	0.0	1	0	0	0	0	0	0	**1**	0	0
2008	JAX	15	0	10	10	0	0.0	0	0	0	0	0	0	0	0	0	0
2009	JAX	15	**2**	29	23	6	0.0	1	0	0	0	0	0	0	0	0	0
2010	CHI	**16**	1	26	**24**	2	**1.0**	**3**	0	0	0	0	**2**	0	0	0	0
2011	CHI	11	0	6	6	0	0.0	0	0	0	0	0	0	0	0	0	0
		85	4	115	97	18	1.0	5	0	0	0	0	0	2	1	0	0

=== Playoffs ===
Year	Team	Games		Tackles					Interceptions					Fumbles			
Year	Team	GP	GS	Cmb	Solo	Ast	Sck	TFL	Int	Yds	TD	Lng	PD	FF	FR	Yds	TD
2007	JAX	**2**	0	**4**	**2**	**2**	0.0	0	0	0	0	0	0	0	0	0	0
2010	CHI	**2**	0	1	1	0	0.0	0	0	0	0	0	0	0	0	0	0
2011	CHI	**2**	0	0	0	0	0.0	0	0	0	0	0	0	0	0	0	0
		6	0	5	3	2	0.0	0	0	0	0	0	0	0	0	0	0
