= Kahlil Bell =

American football player (born 1986)

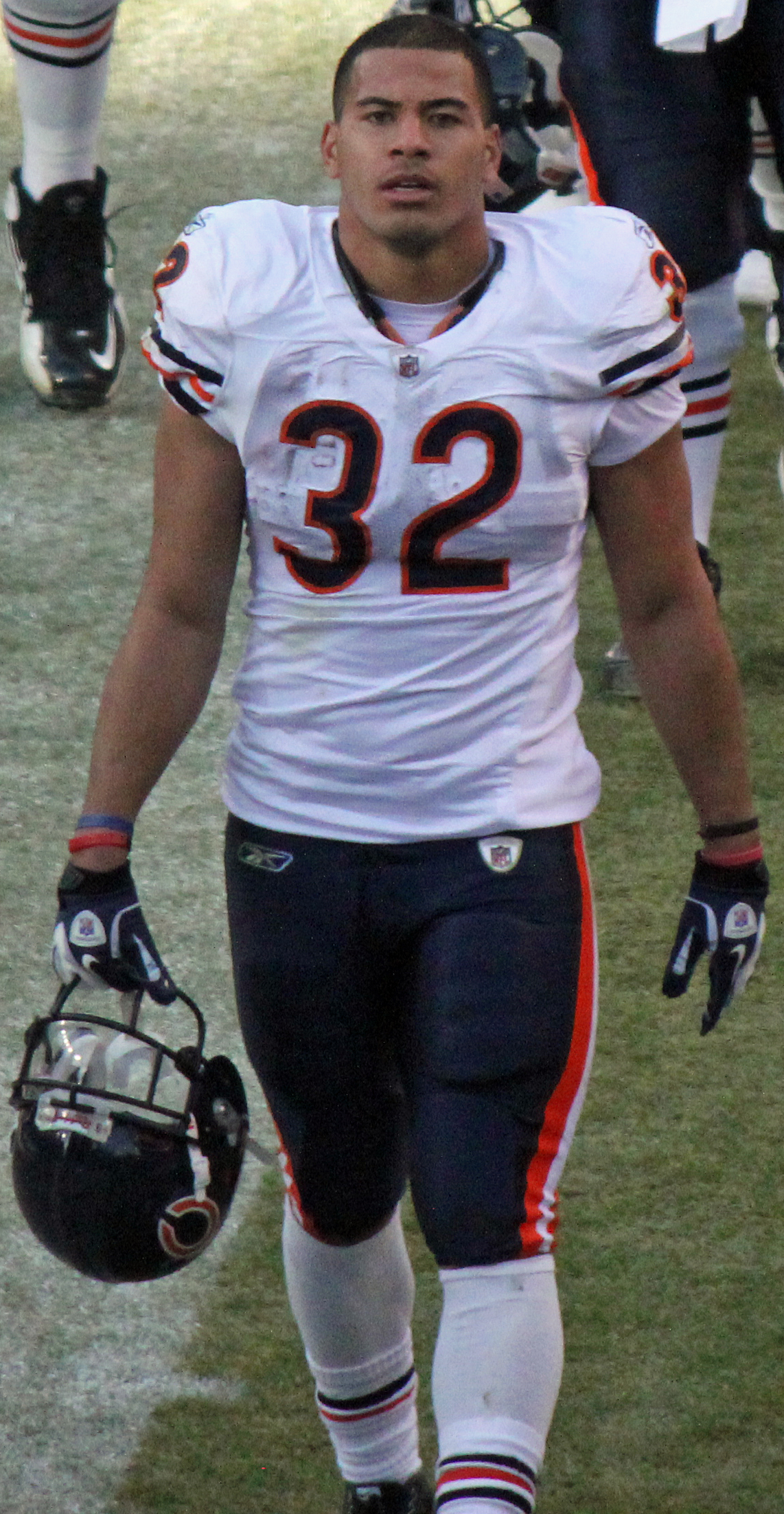
- Bell with the Bears in 2011

No. 32, 21, 22
- Position: Running back

Personal information
- Born: December 10, 1986 (age 39); Santa Rosa, California, U.S.
- Listed height: 5 ft 11 in (1.80 m)
- Listed weight: 219 lb (99 kg)

Career information
- High school: Marin Catholic (Kentfield, California)
- College: UCLA
- NFL draft: 2009: undrafted

Career history
- Minnesota Vikings (2009)*; Chicago Bears (2009–2012); New York Jets (2012); Chicago Bears (2012); New York Jets (2013)*; Green Bay Packers (2013)
- * Offseason or practice squad member only

Career NFL statistics
- Rushing attempts: 148
- Rushing yards: 633
- Receptions: 22
- Receiving yards: 150
- Receiving touchdowns: 1
- Stats at Pro Football Reference

Kahlil Edward Bell (born December 10, 1986) is an American former professional football player who was a running back in the National Football League (NFL). He played college football for the UCLA Bruins. Bell was signed by the Minnesota Vikings as an undrafted free agent in 2009. He was also a member of the Chicago Bears, New York Jets and Green Bay Packers.

== Professional career ==
=== Minnesota Vikings ===
Bell was signed by the Minnesota Vikings as an undrafted free agent on April 27, 2009. He was waived on August 16, 2009.

=== Chicago Bears (first stint) ===
Bell was signed to the Chicago Bears' practice squad on September 16, 2009. He was promoted from the practice squad to the active roster on November 20, 2009, to replace an injured Garrett Wolfe.

His first NFL carry on November 22, 2009, was a 72-yard run against the Philadelphia Eagles on NBC Sunday Night Football. This was an NFL record for longest first carry of a career at the time. Jalen Richard of the Oakland Raiders first ever NFL carry, on September 11, 2016, against the New Orleans Saints, was a 75-yard Touchdown run, and is the current record. His first NFL touchdown catch was a 25-yard reception against the Seattle Seahawks on December 18, 2011.

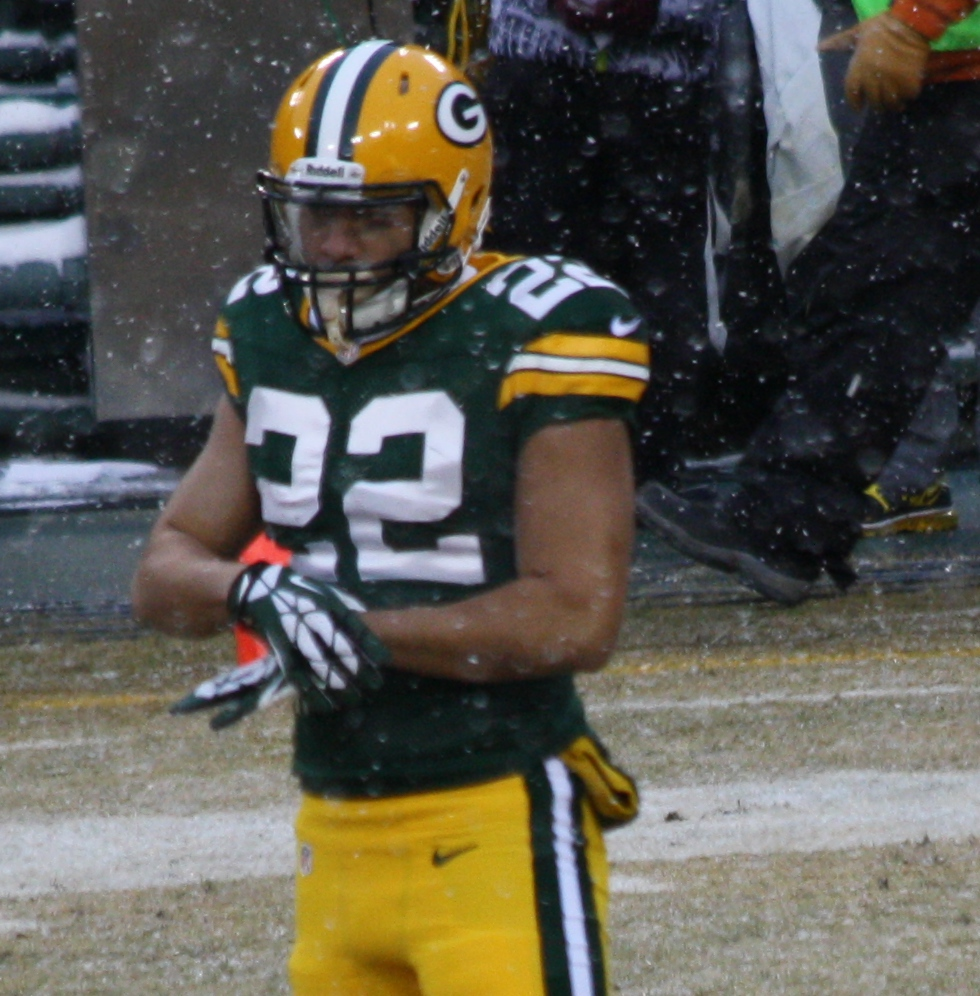
Bell with the Packers

In 2011, after an injury to Matt Forté and Marion Barber, Bell became the starting running back for the Week 16 and 17 games against the Green Bay Packers and Minnesota Vikings after beating out undrafted rookie Armando Allen. Bell also played in the Bears loss against the Denver Broncos. Bell and backup quarterback Josh McCown both generated more than 400 yards in the Packers game. Bell would record 121 on 23 attempts, and caught 4 passes for 38 yards.

In 2012, Bell became an unrestricted free agent, and the Bears extended a qualifying offer to him, which he accepted on April 14, 2012. The contract was worth one-year and $1.26 million. He was waived on August 23, 2012, when he refused to have his contract reduced to $700,000. He was re-signed by the Bears on September 15, 2012, after starting running back Matt Forte went down with an injury. Bell was later waived on October 15.

=== New York Jets (first stint) ===
Bell was signed by the New York Jets on November 13, 2012, following injuries to running backs Bilal Powell and Joe McKnight. He was waived on December 11, 2012.

=== Chicago Bears (second stint) ===
On December 18, 2012, Bell was brought back by the Bears after Michael Bush was placed on injured reserve.

=== New York Jets (second stint) ===
On August 11, 2013, Bell was signed by the Jets after running back John Griffin was waived due to a broken leg. He was released on September 1, 2013.

=== Green Bay Packers ===
On December 2, 2013, Bell was signed by the Green Bay Packers. He was not re-signed at the end of the season, making him a free agent.

== Professional wrestling career ==
Bell participated in season 6 of WWE Tough Enough. Although he initially was part of the 13 official participants, he didn't pass the medical evaluations and was eliminated from the contest.

== Personal life ==
Born in Santa Rosa, California and raised in San Anselmo, California, Bell is of Samoan and African American descent. After football, Bell returned to UCLA, and completed his degree in history, which he earned in spring 2017.
