= Major Wright =

American football player (born 1988)

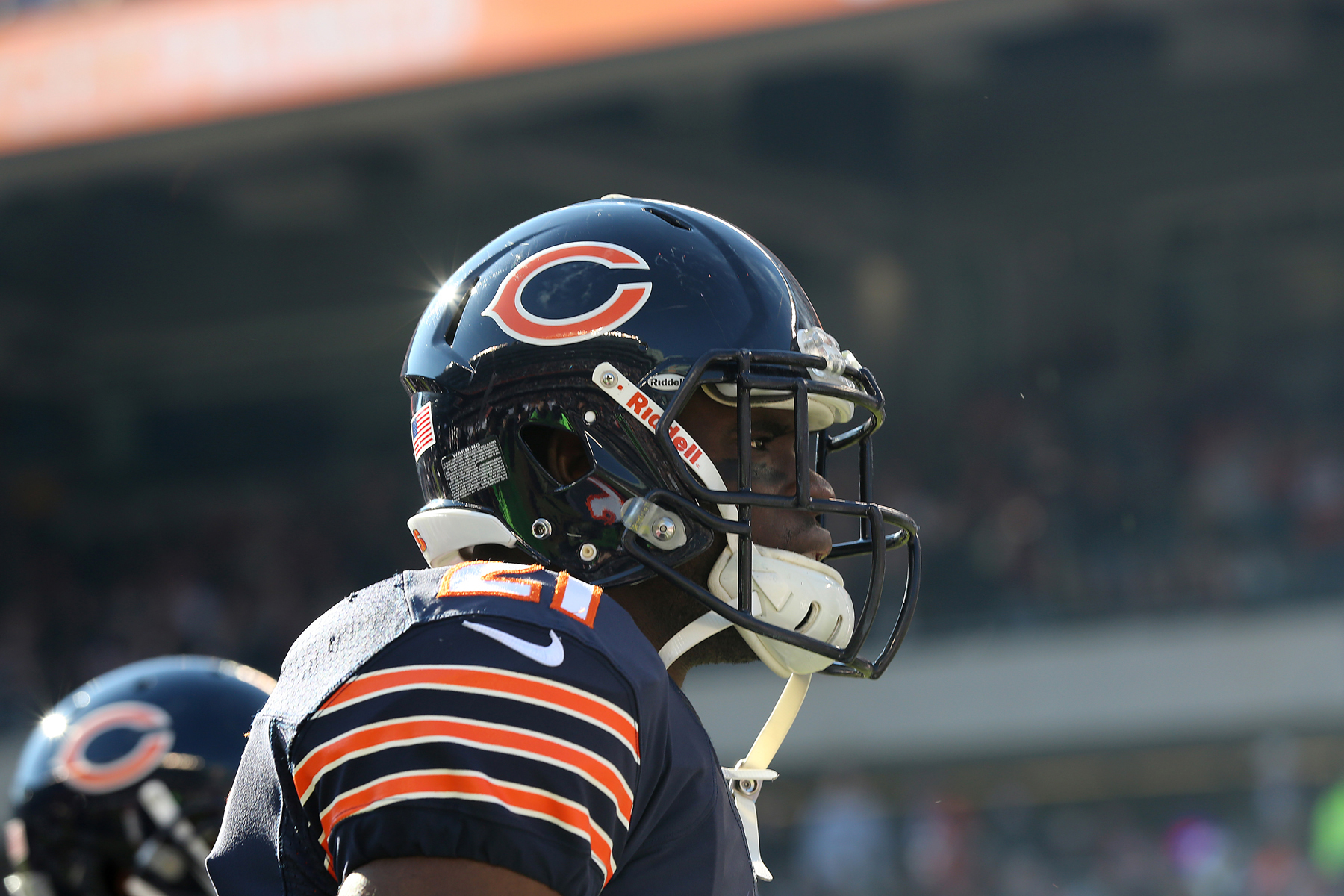
- Wright playing for the Chicago Bears in 2013

No. 27, 21, 31
- Position: Safety

Personal information
- Born: July 1, 1988 (age 38); Lauderdale Lakes, Florida, U.S.
- Listed height: 5 ft 11 in (1.80 m)
- Listed weight: 204 lb (93 kg)

Career information
- High school: St. Thomas Aquinas (Fort Lauderdale, Florida)
- College: Florida (2007–2009)
- NFL draft: 2010: 3rd round, 75th overall pick

Career history
- Chicago Bears (2010–2013); Tampa Bay Buccaneers (2014–2016)

Awards and highlights
- BCS national champion (2008)

Career NFL statistics
- Total tackles: 326
- Forced fumbles: 3
- Fumble recoveries: 2
- Pass deflections: 22
- Interceptions: 9
- Defensive touchdowns: 3
- Stats at Pro Football Reference

Major Wright (born July 1, 1988) is an American former professional football player who was a safety in the National Football League (NFL). He played college football for the Florida Gators, and was a member of a BCS National Championship team. He was selected by the Chicago Bears in the third round of the 2010 NFL draft.

== Early life ==
Wright was born in Lauderdale Lakes, Florida. He attended St. Thomas Aquinas High School in Ft. Lauderdale, Florida, where he played high school football for the St. Thomas Aquinas Raiders and ran track. As a junior, he recorded 58 tackles with six interceptions and as a sophomore had 71 tackles and 10 interceptions. As a senior, he was a finalist for the Hall Trophy (U.S. Army Player of the Year Award) after he recorded 72 tackles and three interceptions. He played in the 2007 U.S. Army All-American Bowl. Wright was an All-state selection both years. In track & field, Wright posted personal-bests of 11.1 in the 100-meter dash, 22.8 in the 200-meter dash and 41.32 in the 4×100-meter relay.

College recruiting
| Name | Hometown | School | Height | Weight | 40^{‡} | Commit date |
|---|---|---|---|---|---|---|
| Major Wright; Safety | Fort Lauderdale | St. Thomas Aquinas | 6 ft 1 in (1.85 m) | 200 lb (91 kg) | 4.5 | Jan 30, 2007 |
| Major Wright; Safety | Recruit ratings: Scout: Rivals: (80) | | | | | |
Overall recruit ranking: Scout: 1 Rivals: 4
Note: In many cases, Scout, Rivals, 247Sports, On3, and ESPN may conflict in their listings of height and weight.; In these cases, the average was taken. ESPN grades are on a 100-point scale.; Sources: "2007 Florida Football Commitment List". Rivals.; "Florida College Football Recruiting Commits". Scout.; "2007 Player Commits". ESPN.; "Scout.com Team Recruiting Rankings". Scout.; "2007 Team Ranking". Rivals.com.

== College career ==
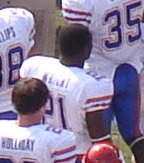
Wright with the Florida Gators in 2008

Wright accepted an athletic scholarship to attend the University of Florida in Gainesville, Florida, where he played for coach Urban Meyer's Florida Gators football team from 2007 to 2009. As a freshman in 2007, Wright started seven of 13 games for the Gators at free safety, recording 67 tackles, four forced fumbles and an interception. He was a first-team freshman All-American by CollegeFootballNews.com and second-team freshman All-American by Rivals.com. As a sophomore in 2008, Wright started all 14 games at free safety, recording 66 tackles and four interceptions, with one returned for a touchdown. He had nine tackles and an interception in the Gators win over the Oklahoma Sooners in the 2009 BCS National Championship Game.

After his junior season, Wright decided to forgo his senior year and enter the NFL draft.

== Professional career ==
Pre-draft measurables
| Height | Weight | Arm length | Hand span | 40-yard dash | 10-yard split | 20-yard split | 20-yard shuttle | Three-cone drill | Vertical jump | Broad jump | Bench press |
|---|---|---|---|---|---|---|---|---|---|---|---|
| 5 ft 11 1/2 in (1.82 m) | 206 lb (93 kg) | 31 in (0.79 m) | 9 3/4 in (0.25 m) | 4.48 s | 1.55 s | 2.60 s | 4.36 s | 6.95 s | 37.5 in (0.95 m) | 9 ft 11 in (3.02 m) | 14 reps |
All values from NFL Combine

=== Chicago Bears ===
The Chicago Bears selected Wright in the third round (75th overall pick) of the 2010 NFL draft. He was predicted to be a future starter by former Bears general manager Jerry Angelo. During his rookie season, Wright played in eleven of sixteen regular season games. He recorded his first career interception in 2011 off a Michael Vick pass against the Philadelphia Eagles, when a pass by Vick squirted through linebacker Lance Briggs's hands into Wright, who was able to return the ball 39 yards. A week later against the Detroit Lions, Wright intercepted a Matthew Stafford lob and returned it 24 yards for a touchdown, which was the first pick-six of his career.

In the 2012 season Wright started all 16 games for the Bears at Strong Safety, recording four interceptions along with 52 tackles for the year. During the Week 3 match up against the St. Louis Rams he returned an interception 45 yards for a defensive touchdown.

=== Tampa Bay Buccaneers ===
On April 4, 2014, Wright agreed to a one-year contract with the Tampa Bay Buccaneers, reuniting with his former Bears head coach Lovie Smith. Wright was cut by the Buccaneers on August 30. Wright rejoined the team on September 3.

Wright re-signed with the Buccaneers on March 7, 2015. On December 30, Wright was placed on injured reserve.

On August 28, 2016, Wright was waived by the Buccaneers. He was re-signed by the Buccaneers on November 29. Wright was released again on December 13.

=== NFL statistics ===
| Year | Team | GP | COMB | TOTAL | AST | SACK | FF | FR | FR YDS | INT | IR YDS | AVG IR | LNG | TD | PD |
|---|---|---|---|---|---|---|---|---|---|---|---|---|---|---|---|
| 2010 | CHI | 11 | 24 | 20 | 4 | 0.0 | 0 | 0 | 0 | 0 | 0 | 0 | 0 | 0 | 0 |
| 2011 | CHI | 12 | 58 | 42 | 16 | 0.0 | 0 | 0 | 0 | 3 | 60 | 20 | 36 | 1 | 7 |
| 2012 | CHI | 16 | 71 | 52 | 19 | 0.0 | 1 | 2 | 0 | 4 | 45 | 11 | 45 | 1 | 8 |
| 2013 | CHI | 15 | 100 | 78 | 22 | 0.0 | 2 | 0 | 0 | 2 | 46 | 23 | 38 | 1 | 3 |
| 2014 | TB | 12 | 51 | 34 | 17 | 0.0 | 0 | 0 | 0 | 0 | 0 | 0 | 0 | 0 | 1 |
| 2015 | TB | 9 | 25 | 16 | 9 | 0.0 | 0 | 0 | 0 | 0 | 0 | 0 | 0 | 0 | 3 |
| 2016 | TB | 2 | 0 | 0 | 0 | 0.0 | 0 | 0 | 0 | 0 | 0 | 0 | 0 | 0 | 0 |
| Career | | 77 | 329 | 242 | 87 | 0.0 | 3 | 2 | 0 | 9 | 151 | 17 | 45 | 3 | 22 |

== Subsequent activities ==
On May 8, 2020, Wright announced his first book called Major Pain: Confessions Of A Smash-Mouth Safety. The premise of his book is to share his journey from humble beginnings to becoming an NFL star, highlighting the challenges, obstacles, and roadblocks he encountered along the way. His story serves as an inspirational reminder that no matter where you come from or what obstacles you face, it is possible to overcome adversity and achieve your goals.

In 2021 Major Wright launched the Wright Way Charities to provide support and hope to single mothers in Ft. Lauderdale, FL. WWC assists with finding jobs, housing, insurance and provides financial literacy teachings. In 2022, Wright wrote his second book, Good Deed Tuesday, a modern-day superhero who gets his superpowers by helping others. Written to inspire kindness in 5-10 year olds, Wright created a school program to bring the positive lessons to the classroom. Recognized as a gifted communicator, Wright holds engaging assemblies in elementary schools to promote kindness and empathy to peers, teachers and family members.

Wright resides in the Ft. Lauderdale area and continues to hold community building events in the neighborhood he grew up in, recognizing the need for positive role models in underserved areas.

== See also ==
- List of Chicago Bears players
- List of Florida Gators in the NFL draft
