= Amobi Okoye =

Nigerian-born American football player (born 1987)

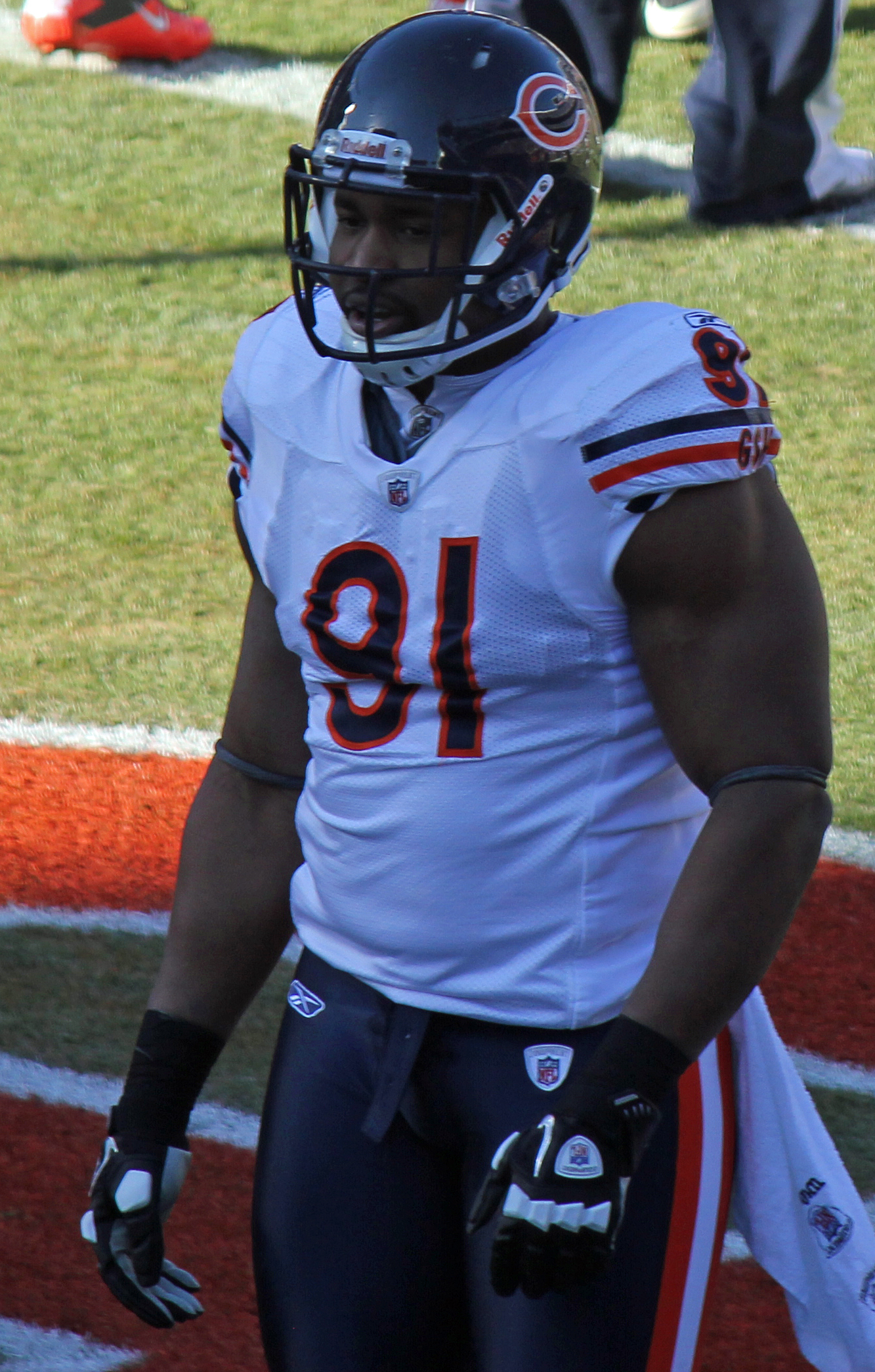
- Okoye with the Chicago Bears in 2011

No. 91
- Position: Defensive tackle

Personal information
- Born: June 10, 1987 (age 39); Anambra State, Nigeria
- Listed height: 6 ft 2 in (1.88 m)
- Listed weight: 302 lb (137 kg)

Career information
- High school: Lee (Huntsville, Alabama, U.S.)
- College: Louisville (2003–2006)
- NFL draft: 2007: 1st round, 10th overall pick

Career history
- Houston Texans (2007–2010); Chicago Bears (2011); Tampa Bay Buccaneers (2012)*; Chicago Bears (2012); Dallas Cowboys (2014)*; Saskatchewan Roughriders (2016)*
- * Offseason or practice squad member only

Awards and highlights
- Second-team All-American (2006)

Career NFL statistics
- Total tackles: 177
- Sacks: 16
- Forced fumbles: 3
- Fumble recoveries: 2
- Stats at Pro Football Reference

Amobi Okoye (born June 10, 1987) is a Nigerian former professional player of American football who was a defensive tackle in the National Football League (NFL). He played college football for the Louisville Cardinals and was selected by the Houston Texans tenth overall in the 2007 NFL draft, the youngest player in NFL history to be drafted in the first round at 19. He was also a member of the Chicago Bears, Tampa Bay Buccaneers, Dallas Cowboys, and Saskatchewan Roughriders.

== Early life ==
Okoye was born in Anambra State, Nigeria, a member of the Igbo ethnic group. He moved to Huntsville, Alabama in the United States when he was 12 years old. After only spending two weeks in middle school, he tested into the 9th grade. He first started playing football as a sophomore at Lee High School, knowing virtually nothing about the game before his high school coach suggested he go play Madden NFL football to learn. By the time he was a senior, he won first-team All-State honors as both a defensive tackle and offensive tackle. Because he shares the same surname as former Kansas City Chiefs fullback Christian Okoye, some sources have claimed that the two are related. Amobi says they are not related, but the two families live on adjoining land in Nigeria.

== College career ==
At age 15 Okoye chose the University of Louisville over Harvard, citing a desire to play for a strong football program.

At Louisville, Okoye majored in biology. He later switched his major to psychology and graduated a semester early, thereby completing his degree in three and a half years. At 16, he became the youngest player in the NCAA. Okoye played in all 13 games as a true freshman at defensive tackle and was credited with 17 tackles and a sack. He recorded then-career-best three tackles against Tulane and recorded his first career sack against UTEP.

As a sophomore, Okoye appeared in 11 of 12 games, recording 26 tackles and a sack. Okoye's only missed game was against East Carolina, because of a shoulder injury. Okoye also made his first collegiate start against Army, recording a career-high seven tackles.

In his junior season of 2005, he recorded 23 tackles and four tackles for a loss. In the biggest game of the year, against the West Virginia Mountaineers, Okoye recorded four tackles. He missed the Florida Atlantic matchup due to a foot sprain. Against Kentucky, Okoye registered two tackles and a fumble recovery. Okoye also totaled three tackles against South Florida.

As a senior in 2006, Okoye finally started all 13 games. In those 13 games, he registered 55 tackles, eight sacks, and recovered three fumbles. Okoye garnered Associated Press Second-team All-American honors and first-team All-Big East honors. As the NCAA's youngest senior at 19 years old, Okoye garnered first-round draft status during the season. Okoye was invited to and performed in the Senior Bowl.

== Professional career ==
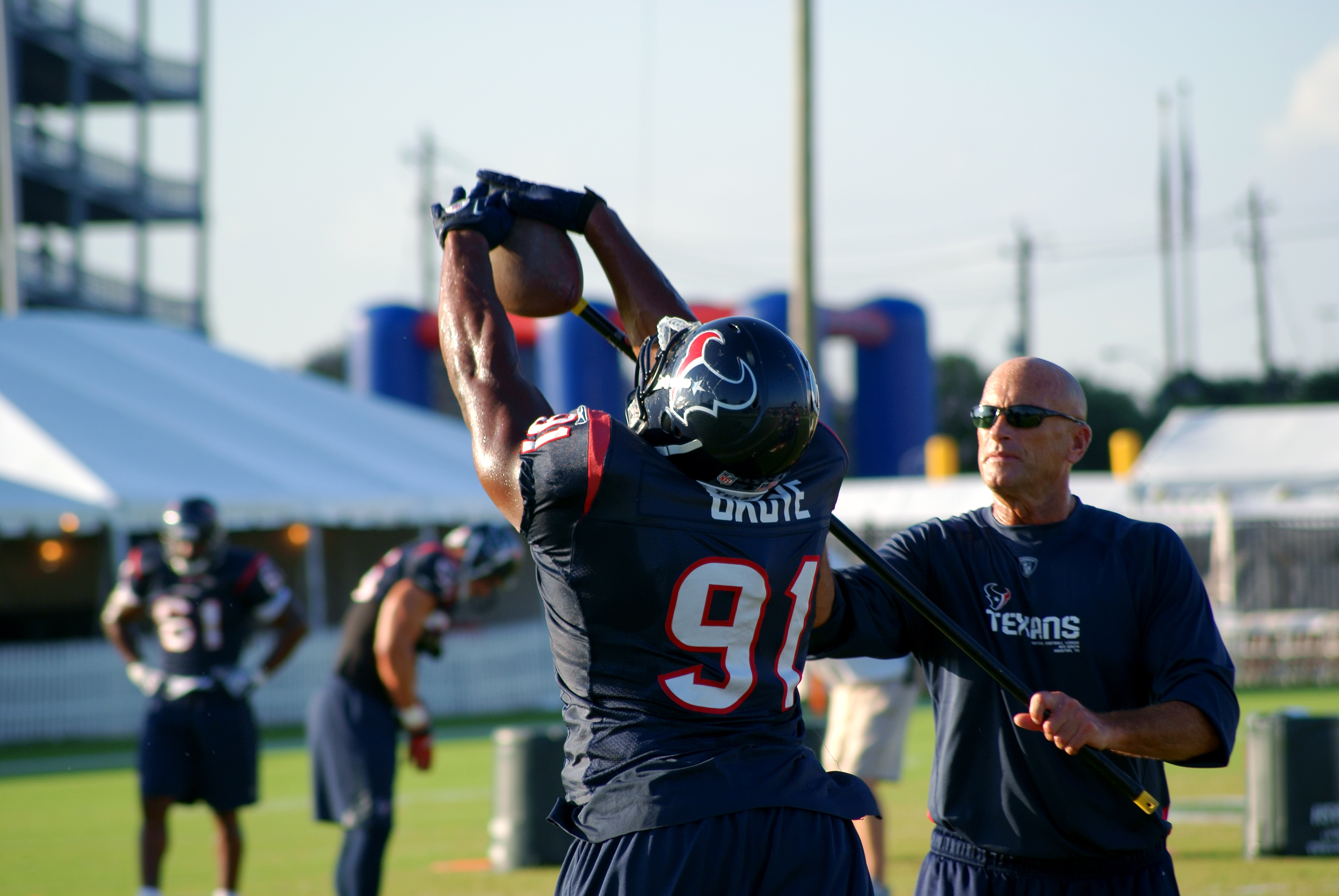
Okoye doing drills in 2010

Pre-draft measurables
| Height | Weight | Arm length | Hand span | 40-yard dash | 10-yard split | 20-yard split | 20-yard shuttle | Three-cone drill | Vertical jump | Broad jump | Bench press | Wonderlic |
|---|---|---|---|---|---|---|---|---|---|---|---|---|
| 6 ft 2 in (1.88 m) | 302 lb (137 kg) | 33 1/2 in (0.85 m) | 9 in (0.23 m) | 4.85 s | 1.65 s | 2.87 s | 4.44 s | 7.46 s | 30 in (0.76 m) | 9 ft 3 in (2.82 m) | 29 reps | X |
20-ss from Louisville Pro Day. All others from NFL Combine

=== Houston Texans ===
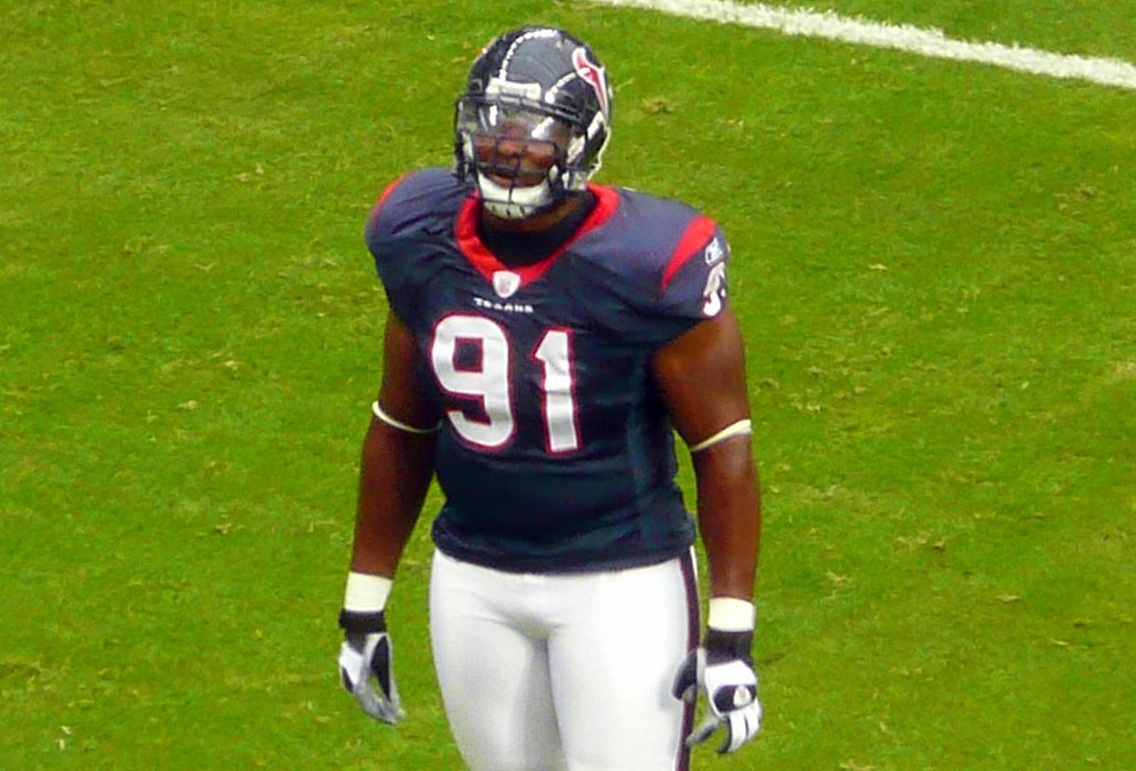
Okoye in 2007 while with the Texans

Okoye was selected by the Houston Texans in the first round of the 2007 NFL draft. He is still the youngest player to ever be drafted in the first round of the NFL Draft at only 19 years. Tremaine Edmunds became the second youngest at 19 years 11 months 26 days old, in 2018, making them the only two teenagers ever drafted in NFL history. He was the highest draft pick to come out of the University of Louisville since the AFL-NFL merger.

Okoye signed a five-year deal with the Texans on July 26, which allowed him to begin training camp with his teammates the next day. With his first start, Okoye became the youngest player to appear in an NFL game since 1967.

Okoye was named Defensive Rookie of the Month for September 2007 after leading the AFC with four sacks. He is the youngest player ever to receive the award.

On July 30, 2011, after four seasons in Houston, he was released.

=== Chicago Bears (first stint) ===
Okoye signed with the Chicago Bears on July 30, 2011. During the 2011 Chicago Bears season, Okoye played 16 games with one start, recording four sacks and 27 combined tackles.

=== Tampa Bay Buccaneers ===
Okoye signed with the Tampa Bay Buccaneers on April 7, 2012. He was released by the team on August 31, before the start of the 2012 NFL season.

=== Chicago Bears (second stint) ===
Okoye returned to the Bears on August 31, 2012, and signed a one-year contract on September 3. He was waived on November 27, but was brought back on December 12. During the 2012 Chicago Bears season, Okoye played in nine games, recording one sack, one forced fumble, and 12 combined tackles.

=== Dallas Cowboys ===
After having missed the 2013 NFL season due to what was referred to at the time as an "undisclosed medical issue", Okoye signed with the Dallas Cowboys on May 16, 2014. On August 14, 2014, more details were revealed regarding his medical situation. Okoye had been diagnosed in March 2013 with anti-NMDA receptor encephalitis and had been placed in a medically induced coma to stabilize recurring seizures. He was cleared by doctors to play again, and is the first football player to attempt to come back from the disease.

On April 8, 2015, Okoye was released by the Cowboys.

=== Saskatchewan Roughriders ===
In July 2016, Okoye signed a contract with the Saskatchewan Roughriders of the Canadian Football League (CFL), and was placed on the team's suspended (inactive) list. His contract with the team expired in February 2017.

== NFL career statistics ==
| Year | Team | GP | Cmb | Solo | Ast | Sck | FF | FR | Yds | Int | Yds | Avg | Lng | TD | PD |
|---|---|---|---|---|---|---|---|---|---|---|---|---|---|---|---|
| 2007 | HOU | 16 | 32 | 23 | 9 | 5.5 | 1 | 0 | 0 | 0 | 0 | 0 | 0 | 0 | 0 |
| 2008 | HOU | 14 | 24 | 15 | 9 | 1.0 | 1 | 1 | 0 | 0 | 0 | 0 | 0 | 0 | 2 |
| 2009 | HOU | 16 | 38 | 26 | 12 | 1.5 | 0 | 0 | 0 | 0 | 0 | 0 | 0 | 0 | 3 |
| 2010 | HOU | 16 | 44 | 27 | 17 | 3.0 | 0 | 1 | 0 | 0 | 0 | 0 | 0 | 0 | 0 |
| 2011 | CHI | 16 | 27 | 18 | 9 | 4.0 | 0 | 0 | 0 | 0 | 0 | 0 | 0 | 0 | 1 |
| 2012 | CHI | 9 | 12 | 9 | 3 | 1.0 | 1 | 0 | 0 | 0 | 0 | 0 | 0 | 0 | 0 |
| Career | | 87 | 177 | 118 | 59 | 16.0 | 3 | 2 | 0 | 0 | 0 | 0 | 0 | 0 | 6 |
