= Draylen Ross =

American football player (born 1988)

No. 84, 49
- Position: Fullback

Personal information
- Born: March 21, 1988 (age 38); Fort Worth, Texas
- Listed height: 6 ft 4 in (1.93 m)
- Listed weight: 292 lb (132 kg)

Career information
- College: North Texas
- NFL draft: 2011: undrafted

Career history
- Chicago Bears (2011–2012)*; Arizona Rattlers (2011–2013)*
- * Offseason or practice squad member only
- Stats at Pro Football Reference
- Stats at ArenaFan.com

Draylen Ross (born March 21, 1988) is an American former football tight end. He played college football for North Texas, where he had one reception for 8 yards in his debut game. In 2008 and 2009, Ross played defensive lineman, where he recorded a total of 40 tackles. He was signed by the Chicago Bears as an undrafted free agent in 2011. However, on August 3, 2011, Ross was waived by the Bears. In November 2011, Ross was signed by the Arizona Rattlers of the Arena Football League as a fullback. On January 6, 2012, Ross was re-signed by the Bears and spent the final nine weeks of the season on the practice squad. On August 8, 2012, the Bears released Ross.
