= Anthony Walters (American football) =

American football player (born 1988)

No. 37, 49
- Position: Safety

Personal information
- Born: September 19, 1988 (age 38); Philadelphia, Pennsylvania, U.S.
- Listed height: 6 ft 1 in (1.85 m)
- Listed weight: 207 lb (94 kg)

Career information
- High school: Cardinal O'Hara (Springfield, Pennsylvania)
- College: Delaware
- NFL draft: 2011: undrafted

Career history
- Chicago Bears (2011−2013); Arizona Cardinals (2014)*; Chicago Bears (2014); Arizona Cardinals (2015)*
- * Offseason or practice squad member only

Awards and highlights
- Third-team All-American (2009); 2× All-CAA (2009, 2010)

Career NFL statistics
- Total tackles: 21
- Fumble recoveries: 1
- Stats at Pro Football Reference

Anthony Walters (born September 19, 1988) is an American former professional football player who was a safety in the National Football League (NFL). He played college football for Delaware Fightin' Blue Hens and was signed by the Chicago Bears as an undrafted free agent on July 26, 2011.

He also played for the Arizona Cardinals.

== College career ==
Walters played at the University of Delaware, and played in all 50 games he appeared in, recording 258 tackles, 12 tackles for losses, one sack, 16 interceptions, and 31 passes broken up. Walters ranks second all-time in school history in pass breakups and fourth in interceptions.

== Professional career ==
=== Chicago Bears ===
After being signed by the Bears, Walters spent the first five weeks on the practice squad, and was elevated on October 11 after Winston Venable was released. However, on November 16, Walters was placed on injured reserve after sustaining a hamstring injury. In the third game of the 2012 preseason against the New York Giants, Walters tipped a David Carr pass to teammate Isaiah Frey with 1:06 left in the game, giving the Bears a 20-17 victory. In Week 15 against the Green Bay Packers, Walters recovered a fumbled lateral, but the Bears failed to capitalize on the recovery, and the Bears lost 21-13. Walters made his first career start in Week 17 against the Detroit Lions after an injury to Chris Conte. In 2013, Walters ranked fifth among Bears players in special teams tackles with 10. Walters became a restricted free agent after the 2013 season.

=== Arizona Cardinals ===
On May 14, 2014, Walters signed a one-year deal with the Arizona Cardinals. The Cardinals released Walters on August 30, 2014.

=== Second stint with the Bears ===
On November 29, 2014, Walters was brought back by the Bears, playing in the final four games of the season. He was released on April 2, 2015.

=== Second stint with the Cardinals ===
On August 18, 2015, Walters was signed by the Cardinals. On September 5, 2015, he was released by the Cardinals.
