= Lance Louis =

American football player (born 1985)

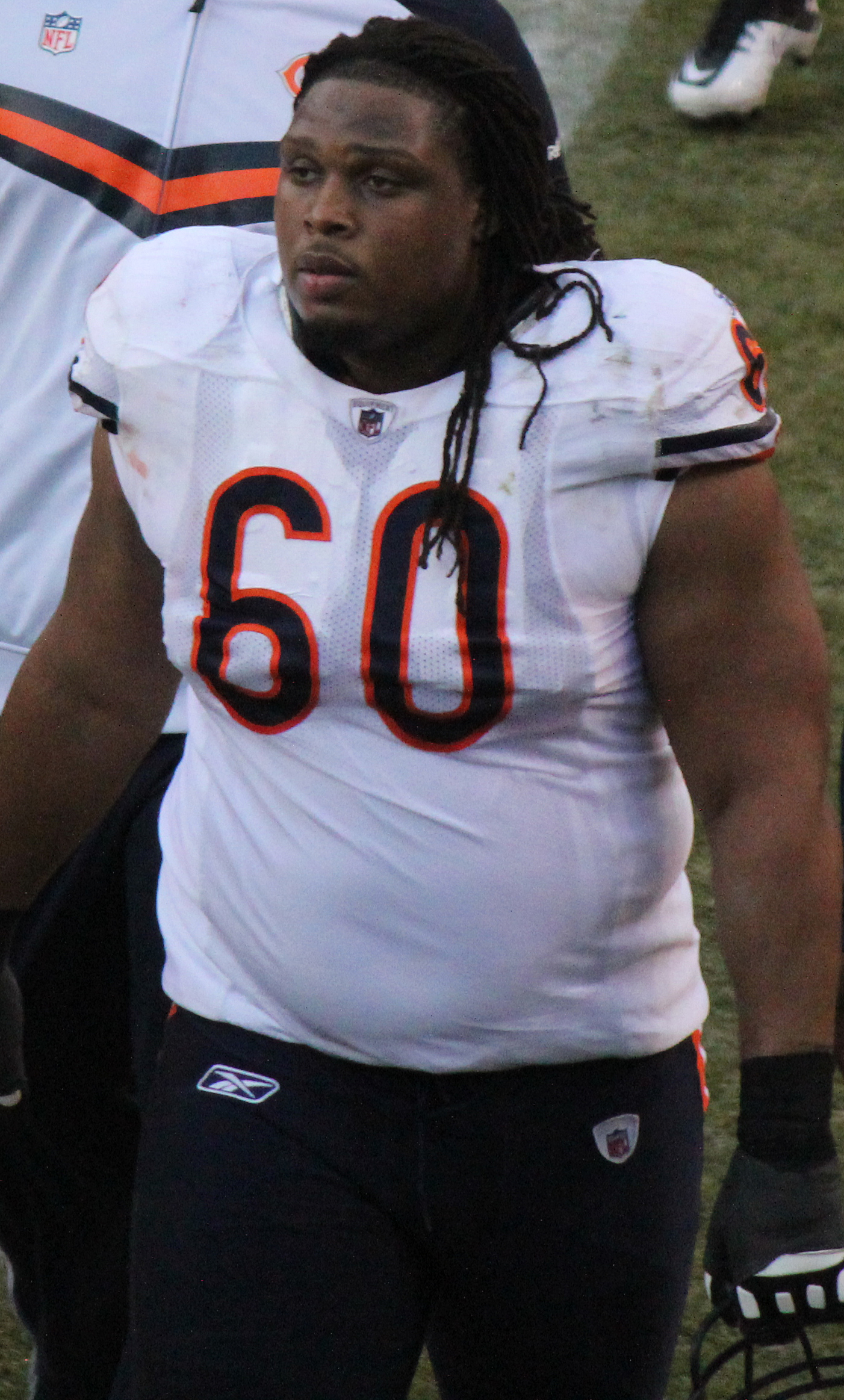
- Louis with the Chicago Bears in 2011

No. 60
- Position: Offensive guard

Personal information
- Born: April 24, 1985 (age 41); New Orleans, Louisiana, U.S.
- Listed height: 6 ft 3 in (1.91 m)
- Listed weight: 323 lb (147 kg)

Career information
- High school: L.B. Landry (New Orleans)
- College: San Diego State
- NFL draft: 2009: 7th round, 246th overall pick

Career history
- Chicago Bears (2009–2012); Miami Dolphins (2013)*; Indianapolis Colts (2014–2015)
- * Offseason or practice squad member only

Career NFL statistics
- Games played: 61
- Games started: 38
- Stats at Pro Football Reference

Lance Louis (born April 24, 1985) is an American former professional football player who was an offensive guard in the National Football League (NFL). He played college football for the San Diego State Aztecs and was selected by the Chicago Bears in the seventh round of the 2009 NFL draft.

== College career ==
Louis played four years of football at San Diego State University, playing tight end as a sophomore, guard as a junior, and started all twelve games senior year at right tackle. In March 2010 he plea guilty to a misdemeanour assault charge relating to a fight with a teammate in a meeting room. He was sentenced to three years of informal probation and a $565 fine.

== Professional career ==
=== Chicago Bears ===
After not being invited to the NFL Combine, Louis was determined to perform admirably at SDSU's pro day. He lived up to the task, weighing in at 303 pounds and running a 4.76 second 40. He was selected in the seventh round of the 2009 NFL draft by the Chicago Bears with the 246th overall pick. 2012 In Week 7, Louis recorded his first reception off a tipped pass from quarterback Jay Cutler. In Week 12 of the 2012 season against the Minnesota Vikings, Louis tore his left ACL after getting blindsided by Jared Allen, and was placed on injured reserve. Allen was fined $20,000 for the hit.

=== Miami Dolphins ===
Louis signed with the Miami Dolphins on March 27, 2013. He was later released on August 27, 2013.

=== Indianapolis Colts ===
On January 15, 2014, Louis signed a reserve/future contract with the Indianapolis Colts. He played in 9 games in 2014, 7 of which were starts.
