= 2009 Chicago Bears season =

NFL team season

- Owner: The McCaskey Family
- General manager: Jerry Angelo
- Head coach: Lovie Smith
- Home stadium: Soldier Field

Results
- Record: 7–9
- Division place: 3rd NFC North
- Playoffs: Did not qualify
- All-Pros: Lance Briggs (2nd team)
- Pro Bowlers: OLB Lance Briggs; KR Johnny Knox

The 2009 season was the Chicago Bears' 90th season in the National Football League, and the sixth under head coach Lovie Smith. The Bears had looked to improve upon their 9–7 record from 2008 and return to the playoffs for the first time since the 2006 season, but failed to do so for the third consecutive season. The team finished 7–9, and third in the NFC North. This season was Lovie Smith's sixth season as the team's head coach. The Bears played all their home games at Soldier Field.

== Offseason ==
=== Coaching changes ===
The Bears hired former Detroit Lions head coach, Rod Marinelli, to be their defensive line and assistant head coach. Bob Babich became the linebackers coach again after Lloyd Lee was fired. However, Babich even though he is still the Defensive Coordinator was stripped of his play calling duties in favor of Head Coach Lovie Smith. Jon Hoke was hired as defensive backs coach.

=== Free agents ===
Position	Player	Free agency tag	Date signed	2009 team
S	Mike Brown	UFA	June 24, 2009	Kansas City Chiefs
QB	Rex Grossman	UFA	June 12, 2009	Houston Texans
CB	Marcus Hamilton	ERFA	March 12, 2009	Chicago Bears
RB	Kevin Jones	UFA	March 6, 2009	Chicago Bears
WR	Brandon Lloyd	UFA	June 15, 2009	Denver Broncos
LB	Darrell McClover	UFA		
S	Brandon McGowan	UFA	May 5, 2009	New England Patriots
OT	Fred Miller	UFA		
LB	Nick Roach	ERFA	March 16, 2009	Chicago Bears
OT	John St. Clair	UFA	March 17, 2009	Cleveland Browns
S	Cameron Worrell	UFA		
RFA: Restricted free agent, UFA: Unrestricted free agent, ERFA: Exclusive rights free agent

=== Additions ===
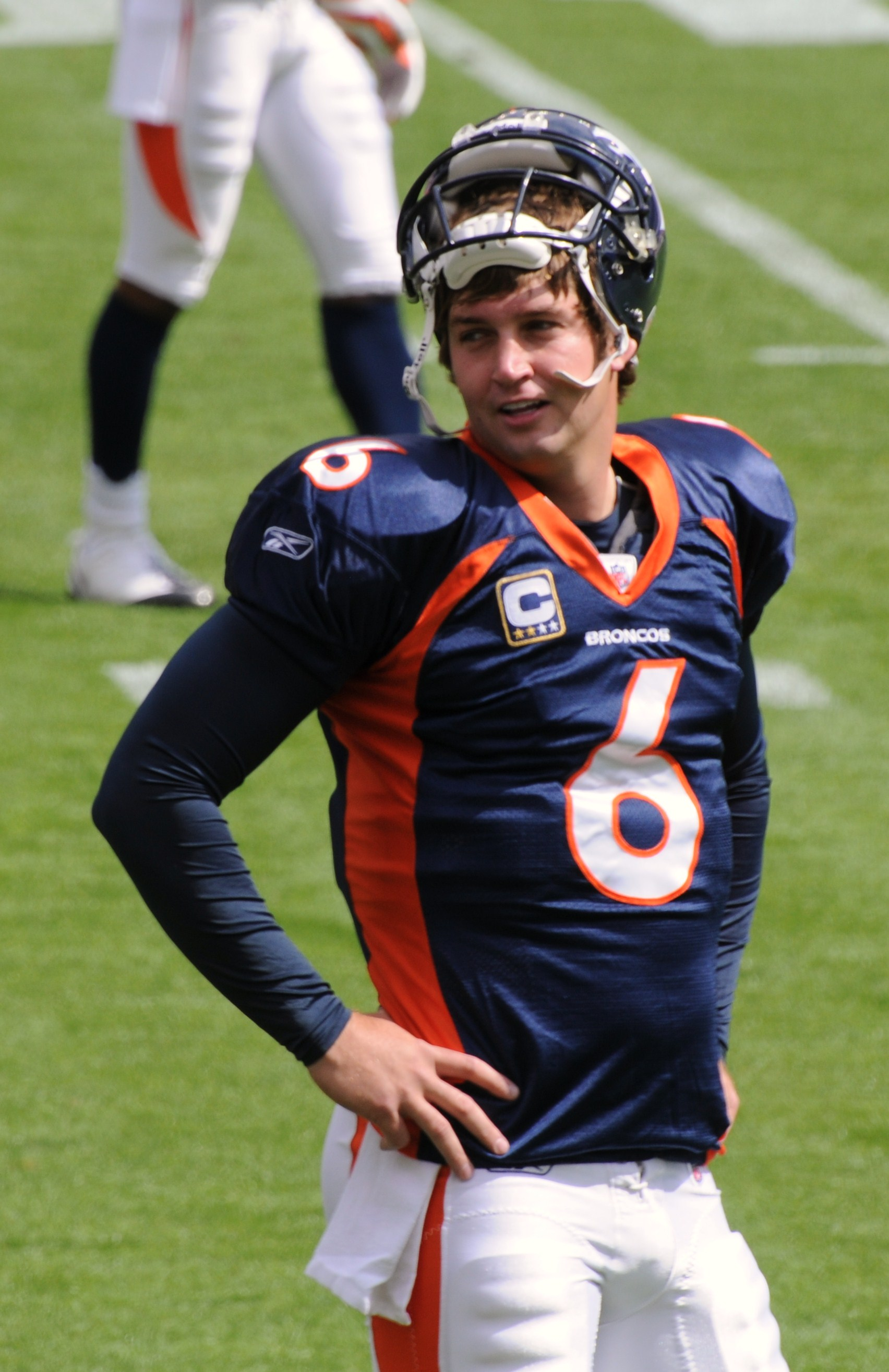
Quarterback Jay Cutler was acquired from the Denver Broncos via trade.

- On December 30, 2008 the Bears signed DE Joe Clermond, LB Marcus Riley, WR Rudy Burgess, OT Cody Balogh, WR John Broussard, OG Tyler Reed, and TE Fontel Mines
- On February 3, 2009 the Bears signed QB Brett Basanez
- On February 27, 2009 just hours into free agency, the Bears agreed to a four-year contract with offensive lineman Frank Omiyale
- On March 11, 2009 the Bears signed unrestricted free agent free safety Josh Bullocks to a one-year contract. He previously played for the New Orleans Saints.
- On March 21, 2009 it was announced the Bears had signed safety Glenn Earl to a one-year contract.
- On March 25, 2009 the Bears agreed to terms with free agent tackle Kevin Shaffer
- On April 2, the Bears received Jay Cutler through a trade with the Denver Broncos.
- On April 2, the Bears signed Orlando Pace to a three-year deal.
- On May 11, the Bears signed tight end Michael Gaines to a one-year contract.
- On May 29, the Bears signed Pisa Tinoisamoa to a one-year contract.
- On September 1, the Bears signed Rod Hood who played in 2008 for the NFC Champion Arizona Cardinals
- On October 19, defensive end Gaines Adams was traded to the Bears for a 2nd round draft pick in the 2010 NFL draft.

=== Departures ===
- Marty Booker (released)
- Gilbert Gardner (released)
- Marcus Riley (waived)
- Mike Brown (released)
- John Tait (retired)
- Terrence Metcalf (released)
- Kyle Orton (traded)
- Brandon Lloyd (released)

=== 2009 NFL draft ===
2009 Chicago Bears draft
Round	Pick	Player	Position	College	Notes
3	68	Jarron Gilbert	Defensive tackle	San Jose State	
3	99	Juaquin Iglesias	Wide receiver	Oklahoma	
4	105	Henry Melton *	Defensive end	Texas	
4	119	D.J. Moore	Cornerback	Vanderbilt	
5	140	Johnny Knox *	Wide receiver	Abilene Christian	
5	154	Marcus Freeman	Linebacker	Ohio State	
6	190	Al Afalava	Safety	Oregon State	
7	246	Lance Louis	Tight end / offensive lineman	San Diego State	
7	251	Derek Kinder	Wide receiver	Pittsburgh	
Made roster * Made at least one Pro Bowl during career

- Picks #99, #246 and #251 are compensatory draft picks.
- The Bears received picks #68 and #105 after a trade with Seattle for the Bears 2nd round pick at #49.

==== Draft pick trades ====
- In 2008, Tampa Bay traded its sixth-round selection to Chicago for quarterback Brian Griese.
- In 2008, the Bears traded their seventh seventh-round selection to Tampa Bay for guard Dan Buenning.
- In 2009, the Bears traded their 2009 first round pick (18th overall), their 2009 third round pick (84th overall), their 2010 first round pick and quarterback Kyle Orton for quarterback Jay Cutler and a 2009 fifth round pick (140th overall) from Denver originally belonging to Seattle.

=== Undrafted free agents ===
Name	Position	College
Johan Asiata	Guard	UNLV
Dennis Conley	Guard	Hampton
Dahna Deleston	Safety	Connecticut
Kevin Malast	Linebacker	Rutgers
Eric Peterman	Wide receiver	Northwestern
Mike Rivera	Linebacker	Kansas
Will Ta'ufo’ou	Fullback	California
Woodny Turenne	Cornerback	Louisville

== Rosters ==
=== Opening training camp roster ===
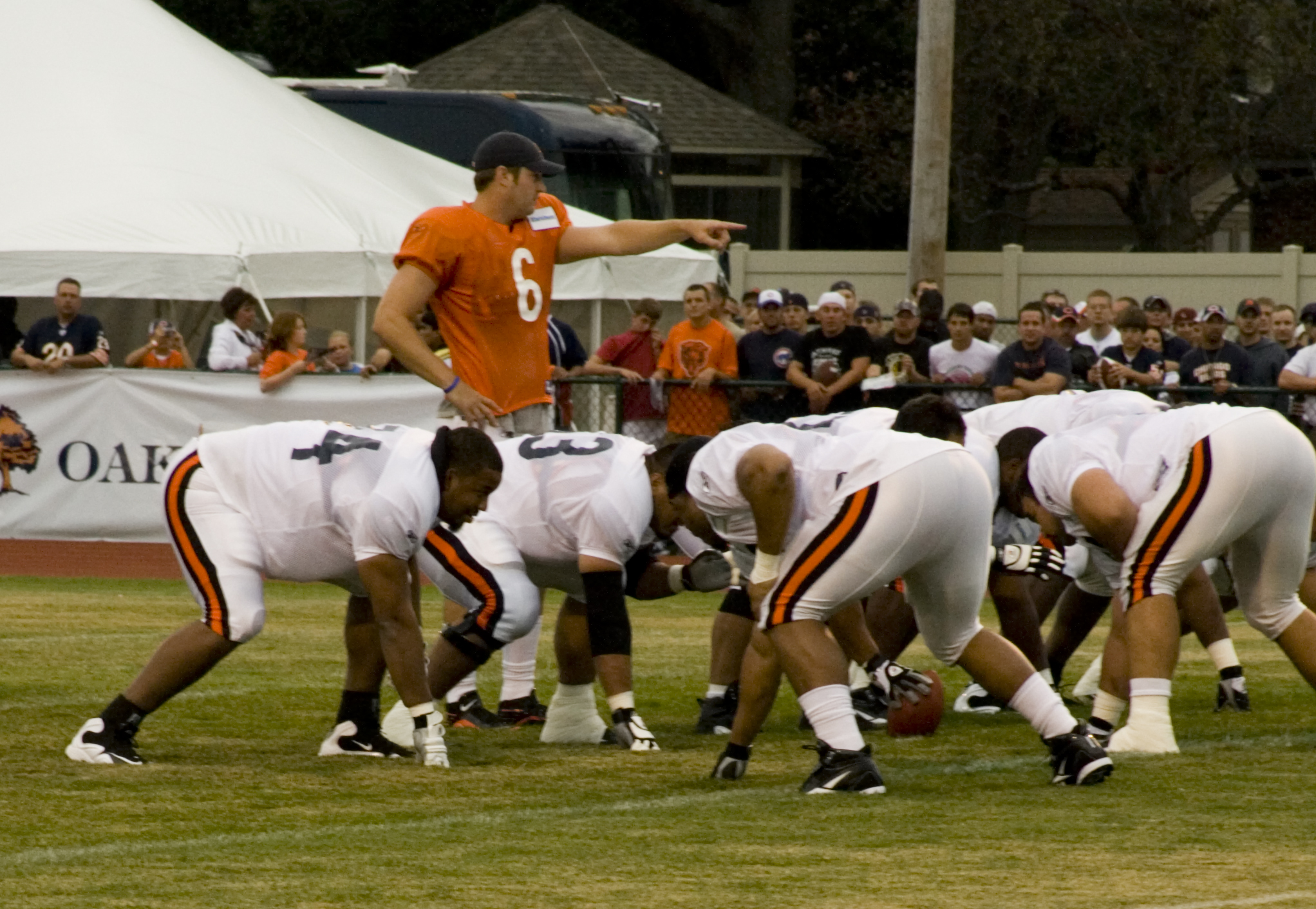
Newly acquired quarterback Jay Cutler points out the mike linebacker during training camp.

Chicago Bears 2009 opening training camp roster
Quarterbacks: 14 Brett Basanez; 6 Jay Cutler; 12 Caleb Hanie; Running backs: 43 Jason Davis FB; 22 Matt Forté; 27 Kevin Jones; 37 Jason McKie FB; 29 Adrian Peterson; 45 Will Ta'ufo'ou FB; 25 Garrett Wolfe; Wide receivers: 19 Devin Aromashodu; 80 Earl Bennett; 15 John Broussard; 81 Rashied Davis; 23 Devin Hester; 17 Juaquin Iglesias; 83 Derek Kinder; 13 Johnny Knox; 86 Eric Peterman; 84 Brandon Rideau; Tight ends: 88 Desmond Clark; 87 Kellen Davis; 85 Michael Gaines; 89 Fontel Mines; 82 Greg Olsen	Offensive linemen: 62 Johan Asiata G; 79 Cody Balogh T; 67 Josh Beekman G/C; 72 Dan Buenning G; 70 Dennis Conley G; 63 Roberto Garza G/C; 57 Olin Kreutz C; 60 Lance Louis G; 68 Frank Omiyale T; 76 Orlando Pace T; 64 Tyler Reed G; 78 Kevin Shaffer T; 74 Chris Williams T; Defensive linemen: 95 Anthony Adams DT; 97 Mark Anderson DE; 99 Ervin Baldwin DE; 96 Alex Brown DE; 72 Joe Clermond DE; 98 Dusty Dvoracek DT; 73 Jarron Gilbert DT; 91 Tommie Harris DT; 94 Marcus Harrison DT; 71 Israel Idonije DT; 69 Henry Melton DE; 93 Adewale Ogunleye DE; 75 Matt Toeaina DT	Linebackers: 55 Lance Briggs OLB; 58 Marcus Freeman OLB; 92 Hunter Hillenmeyer OLB; 90 Joey LaRocque OLB; 62 Kevin Malast OLB; 60 Mike Rivera ILB; 53 Nick Roach OLB; 59 Pisa Tinoisamoa OLB; 54 Brian Urlacher ILB; 52 Jamar Williams OLB; Defensive backs: 46 Al Afalava S; 35 Zackary Bowman CB; 36 Josh Bullocks SS; 39 Rudy Burgess CB; 45 Dahna Deleston S; 21 Corey Graham FS; 24 Marcus Hamilton CB; 38 Danieal Manning FS; 26 Trumaine McBride CB; 30 D. J. Moore CB; 44 Kevin Payne SS; 20 Craig Steltz FS; 33 Charles Tillman CB; 47 Woodny Turenne CB; 31 Nathan Vasher CB; Special teams: 9 Robbie Gould K; 65 Patrick Mannelly LS; 4 Brad Maynard P	Reserve lists: Currently vacant; 79 Active, 0 Inactive

=== Week 1 roster ===
Chicago Bears 2009 week 1 roster
Quarterbacks: 6 Jay Cutler; 12 Caleb Hanie; Running backs: 22 Matt Forté; 37 Jason McKie FB; 29 Adrian Peterson; 25 Garrett Wolfe; Wide receivers: 19 Devin Aromashodu; 80 Earl Bennett; 81 Rashied Davis; 23 Devin Hester PR; 17 Juaquin Iglesias; 13 Johnny Knox; Tight ends: 88 Desmond Clark; 87 Kellen Davis; 86 Michael Gaines; 82 Greg Olsen	Offensive linemen: 67 Josh Beekman G/C; 63 Roberto Garza G/C; 57 Olin Kreutz C; 60 Lance Louis T/G; 68 Frank Omiyale G/T; 76 Orlando Pace T; 78 Kevin Shaffer T; 74 Chris Williams T; Defensive linemen: 95 Anthony Adams DT; 97 Mark Anderson DE; 96 Alex Brown DE; 90 Jarron Gilbert DT; 91 Tommie Harris DT; 94 Marcus Harrison DT; 71 Israel Idonije DT; 93 Adewale Ogunleye DE; 75 Matt Toeaina DT	Linebackers: 55 Lance Briggs OLB; 92 Hunter Hillenmeyer ILB; 53 Nick Roach OLB; 59 Pisa Tinoisamoa OLB; 54 Brian Urlacher ILB; 52 Jamar Williams OLB; Defensive backs: 24 Al Afalava SS; 35 Zackary Bowman CB; 36 Josh Bullocks FS; 21 Corey Graham CB; 38 Danieal Manning FS/KR; 26 Trumaine McBride CB; 30 D. J. Moore CB; 44 Kevin Payne SS; 20 Craig Steltz FS; 33 Charles Tillman CB; 31 Nathan Vasher CB; Special teams: 9 Robbie Gould K; 65 Patrick Mannelly LS; 4 Brad Maynard P	Reserve lists: 98 Dusty Dvoracek DT (IR); 27 Kevin Jones RB (IR); 69 Henry Melton DE (IR); 89 Fontel Mines TE (IR); 64 Tyler Reed G (IR); Practice Squad: 62 Johan Asiata G; 99 Ervin Baldwin DE; 14 Brett Basanez QB; 70 Joe Clermond DE; 72 James Marten OT; 73 Donovan Raiola C; 45 Will Ta'ufo'ou FB; 47 Woodny Turenne CB; 53 Active, 5 Inactive, 8 PS

=== Final roster ===
2009 Chicago Bears roster
Quarterbacks (QB): 14 Brett Basanez; 6 Jay Cutler; 12 Caleb Hanie; Running backs (RB): 32 Kahlil Bell; 22 Matt Forte; 37 Jason McKie FB; 29 Adrian Peterson; Wide receivers (WR): 19 Devin Aromashodu; 80 Earl Bennett PR; 81 Rashied Davis; 23 Devin Hester KR/PR; 17 Juaquin Iglesias; 13 Johnny Knox KR; Tight ends (TE): 88 Desmond Clark; 87 Kellen Davis; 82 Greg Olsen	Offensive linemen (OL): 67 Josh Beekman C/G; 63 Roberto Garza G; 57 Olin Kreutz C; 60 Lance Louis G; 72 James Marten T; 68 Frank Omiyale G; 76 Orlando Pace T; 78 Kevin Shaffer T; 74 Chris Williams T; Defensive linemen (DL): 95 Anthony Adams DT; 99 Gaines Adams DE; 97 Mark Anderson DE; 96 Alex Brown DE; 90 Jarron Gilbert DT; 91 Tommie Harris DT; 94 Marcus Harrison DT; 75 Matt Toeaina DT	Linebackers (LB): 55 Lance Briggs OLB; 92 Hunter Hillenmeyer MLB; 98 Darrell McClover OLB; 53 Nick Roach MLB/OLB; 58 Tim Shaw MLB; 52 Jamar Williams OLB; Defensive backs (DB): 24 Al Afalava SS; 35 Zack Bowman CB; 36 Josh Bullocks SS; 21 Corey Graham CB; 38 Danieal Manning FS/KR; 30 D. J. Moore CB; 44 Kevin Payne FS; 20 Craig Steltz FS; 47 Woodny Turenne CB; 31 Nathan Vasher CB; Special teams (ST): 9 Robbie Gould K; 65 Patrick Mannelly LS; 10 Richmond McGee P; 4 Brad Maynard P	Practice squad: 62 Johan Asiata G; 85 Kevin Brock TE; 64 Kevin Malast LB; 86 Eric Peterman WR; 73 Donovan Raiola C; 45 Will Taʻufoʻou FB; Reserve: -- Dusty Dvoracek DT (IR); 71 Israel Idonije DT (IR); 27 Kevin Jones RB (IR); 69 Henry Melton DE (IR); 89 Fontel Mines TE (IR); 93 Adewale Ogunleye DE (IR); -- Tyler Reed G (IR); 33 Charles Tillman CB (IR); 59 Pisa Tinoisamoa LB (IR); 54 Brian Urlacher LB (IR); 25 Garrett Wolfe RB (IR); Rookies in italics 53 active, 11 reserve, 6 practice squad

== Staff ==
Chicago Bears 2009 staff
Front office: Secretary of the board of directors – Virginia Halas McCaskey; Chairman – Michael McCaskey; President/CEO – Ted Phillips; Vice president – Tim McCaskey; general manager – Jerry Angelo; Senior director of football administration/general counsel – Cliff Stein; Senior director of pro personnel – Bobby DePaul; Director of college scouting – Greg Gabriel; Assistant director of pro personnel – Kevin Turks; Head coaches: Head coach – Lovie Smith; Assistant head coach/defensive line – Rod Marinelli; Offensive coaches: Offensive coordinator – Ron Turner; Quarterbacks – Pep Hamilton; Running backs – Tim Spencer; Wide receivers – Darryl Drake; Tight ends – Rob Boras; Offensive line – Harry Hiestand; Offensive assistant/assistant offensive line – Luke Butkus; Offensive assistant/assistant wide receivers – Charles London	Defensive coaches: Defensive coordinator/linebackers – Bob Babich; Defensive backs – Jon Hoke; Assistant Defensive Backs (Safeties) – Gill Byrd; Defensive assistant/assistant defensive line – Eric Washington; Special teams coaches: Special teams coordinator – Dave Toub; Assistant special teams – Chris Tabor; Strength and conditioning: Director of physical development – Rusty Jones; Strength and conditioning – Jim Arthur

== Schedule ==
=== Preseason ===
Week	Date	Opponent	Result	Record	Game site	NFL.com recap
1	August 15	at Buffalo Bills	L 20–27	0–1	Ralph Wilson Stadium	Recap
2	August 22	New York Giants	W 17–3	1–1	Soldier Field	Recap
3	August 30	at Denver Broncos	W 27–17	2–1	Invesco Field at Mile High	Recap
4	September 3	Cleveland Browns	W 26–23	3–1	Soldier Field	Recap

=== Regular season ===
Week	Date	Opponent	Result	Record	Game site	NFL.com recap
1	September 13	at Green Bay Packers	L 15–21	0–1	Lambeau Field	Recap
2	September 20	Pittsburgh Steelers	W 17–14	1–1	Soldier Field	Recap
3	September 27	at Seattle Seahawks	W 25–19	2–1	Qwest Field	Recap
4	October 4	Detroit Lions	W 48–24	3–1	Soldier Field	Recap
5	Bye					
6	October 18	at Atlanta Falcons	L 14–21	3–2	Georgia Dome	Recap
7	October 25	at Cincinnati Bengals	L 10–45	3–3	Paul Brown Stadium	Recap
8	November 1	Cleveland Browns	W 30–6	4–3	Soldier Field	Recap
9	November 8	Arizona Cardinals	L 21–41	4–4	Soldier Field	Recap
10	November 12	at San Francisco 49ers	L 6–10	4–5	Candlestick Park	Recap
11	November 22	Philadelphia Eagles	L 20–24	4–6	Soldier Field	Recap
12	November 29	at Minnesota Vikings	L 10–36	4–7	Metrodome	Recap
13	December 6	St. Louis Rams	W 17–9	5–7	Soldier Field	Recap
14	December 13	Green Bay Packers	L 14–21	5–8	Soldier Field	Recap
15	December 20	at Baltimore Ravens	L 7–31	5–9	M&T Bank Stadium	Recap
16	December 28	Minnesota Vikings	W 36–30 (OT)	6–9	Soldier Field	Recap
17	January 3	at Detroit Lions	W 37–23	7–9	Ford Field	Recap

== Standings ==
NFC North
	W	L	T	PCT	DIV	CONF	PF	PA	STK
^{(2)} Minnesota Vikings	12	4	0	.750	5–1	9–3	470	312	W1
^{(5)} Green Bay Packers	11	5	0	.688	4–2	9–3	461	297	W2
Chicago Bears	7	9	0	.438	3–3	5–7	327	375	W2
Detroit Lions	2	14	0	.125	0–6	1–11	262	494	L6

== Regular season ==
=== Week 1 ===
Chicago Bears at Green Bay Packers

Team	1	2	3	4	Total
Bears	0	2	10	3	15
• Packers	0	10	0	11	21

- Date: September 13
- Location: Lambeau Field, Green Bay, Wisconsin
- Game start: 8:20 p.m. EST
- Game attendance: 70,920
- Game weather: Mostly cloudy; 76 °F (24 °C)
- Referee: Ron Winter
- TV announcers (NBC): Al Michaels, Cris Collinsworth, and Andrea Kremer

Scoring summary
Q2	8:18	GB	Mason Crosby 52-yard field goal	GB 3–0
Q2	5:52	CHI	Safety, Aaron Rodgers tackled by Danieal Manning in end zone	GB 3–2
Q2	4:36	GB	Ryan Grant 1 yard run (Mason Crosby kick)	GB 10–2
Q3	10:14	CHI	Devin Hester 36-yard pass from Jay Cutler (Robbie Gould kick)	GB 10–9
Q3	3:51	CHI	Robbie Gould 47-yard field goal	CHI 12–10
Q4	10:10	GB	Mason Crosby 39-yard field goal	GB 13–12
Q4	2:35	CHI	Robbie Gould 21-yard field goal	CHI 15–13
Q4	1:11	GB	Greg Jennings 50-yard pass from Aaron Rodgers (Greg Jennings pass from Aaron Rodgers)	GB 21–15

The Bears began their season at Lambeau Field for a Sunday night battle with their hated rival, the Green Bay Packers. After a scoreless first quarter, Chicago trailed early as Packers kicker Mason Crosby got a 52-yard field goal. The Bears would respond with safety Danieal Manning sacking quarterback Aaron Rodgers in his own endzone for a safety, but Green Bay would respond as running back Ryan Grant got a 1-yard touchdown run.

Chicago would take the lead in the third quarter as quarterback Jay Cutler completed a 36-yard pass to wide receiver Devin Hester, along with kicker Robbie Gould making a 47-yard field goal. Afterwards, the lead went back and forth in the fourth quarter. Crosby would kick a 39-yard field goal, while Gould nailed a 21-yard field goal. Afterwards, the Packers took the lead again as Rodgers completed a 50-yard touchdown pass and the following two-point conversion to wide receiver Greg Jennings. The Bears tried to rally, but an interception ended any hope of a comeback.

With the loss, Chicago began its season at 0–1.

Cutler's 4 interceptions were the most he had thrown in one game of his career, until week 10 against the 49ers.

=== Week 2 ===
Pittsburgh Steelers at Chicago Bears

Team	1	2	3	4	Total
Steelers	7	0	7	0	14
• Bears	0	7	0	10	17

- Date: September 20
- Location: Soldier Field, Chicago, Illinois
- Game start: 4:15 p.m. EST
- Game attendance: 62,231
- Game weather: Light rain; 70 °F (21 °C)
- Referee: Scott Green
- TV announcers (CBS): Jim Nantz and Phil Simms

Scoring summary
Q1	4:58	PIT	Matt Spaeth 1 yard pass from Ben Roethlisberger (Jeff Reed kick)	PIT 7–0
Q2	:19	CHI	Kellen Davis 6-yard pass from Jay Cutler (Robbie Gould kick)	Tie 7–7
Q3	5:26	PIT	Ben Roethlisberger 2-yard run (Jeff Reed kick)	PIT 14–7
Q4	6:21	CHI	Johnny Knox 7-yard pass from Jay Cutler (Robbie Gould kick)	Tie 14–14
Q4	:15	CHI	Robbie Gould 44-yard field goal	CHI 17–14

Hoping to rebound from their Sunday night loss to the Packers, the Bears played their Week 2 home opener against the defending Super Bowl champions, the Pittsburgh Steelers. The Steelers took an early lead in the first quarter as quarterback Ben Roethlisberger completed a 1-yard TD pass to tight end Matt Spaeth, but the Bears immediately fired back in the second quarter as quarterback Jay Cutler completed a 7-yard TD pass to tight end Kellen Davis to tie the score 7–7.

In the third quarter, Pittsburgh retook the lead once more as Roethlisberger got a 2-yard run, but Chicago would rally in the fourth quarter as Cutler threw a 7-yard touchdown pass to rookie wide receiver Johnny Knox. The Steelers would then miss 2 field goal attempts, as the Bears drive the ball down to Steelers territory, ending the drive with kicker Robbie Gould's 44-yard field goal, to give the Bears the lead. The Steelers then fumbled the ball on the ensuing kickoff, ending any chance for a last second hail mary.

With this win, the Bears improved to 1–1.

=== Week 3 ===
Chicago Bears at Seattle Seahawks

Team	1	2	3	4	Total
• Bears	0	7	10	8	25
Seahawks	10	3	0	6	19

- Date: September 27
- Location: Qwest Field, Seattle, Washington
- Game start: 4:05 p.m. EST
- Game attendance: 67,938
- Game weather: Sunny; 60 °F (16 °C)
- Referee: Don Carey
- TV announcers (Fox): Dick Stockton and Charles Davis

Scoring summary
Q1	10:24	SEA	Julius Jones 39-yard pass from Seneca Wallace (Olindo Mare kick)	SEA 7–0
Q1	:40	SEA	Olindo Mare 46-yard field goal	SEA 10–0
Q2	12:02	SEA	Olindo Mare 37-yard field goal	SEA 13–0
Q2	1:56	CHI	Greg Olsen 1 yard pass from Jay Cutler (Robbie Gould kick)	SEA 13–7
Q3	11:28	CHI	Johnny Knox 7-yard pass from Jay Cutler (Robbie Gould kick)	CHI 14–13
Q3	5:31	CHI	Robbie Gould 37-yard field goal	CHI 17–13
Q4	14:48	SEA	Olindo Mare 39-yard field goal	CHI 17–16
Q4	5:12	SEA	Olindo Mare 46-yard field goal	SEA 19–17
Q4	1:52	CHI	Devin Hester 36-yard pass from Jay Cutler (Earl Bennett pass from Jay Cutler)	CHI 25–19

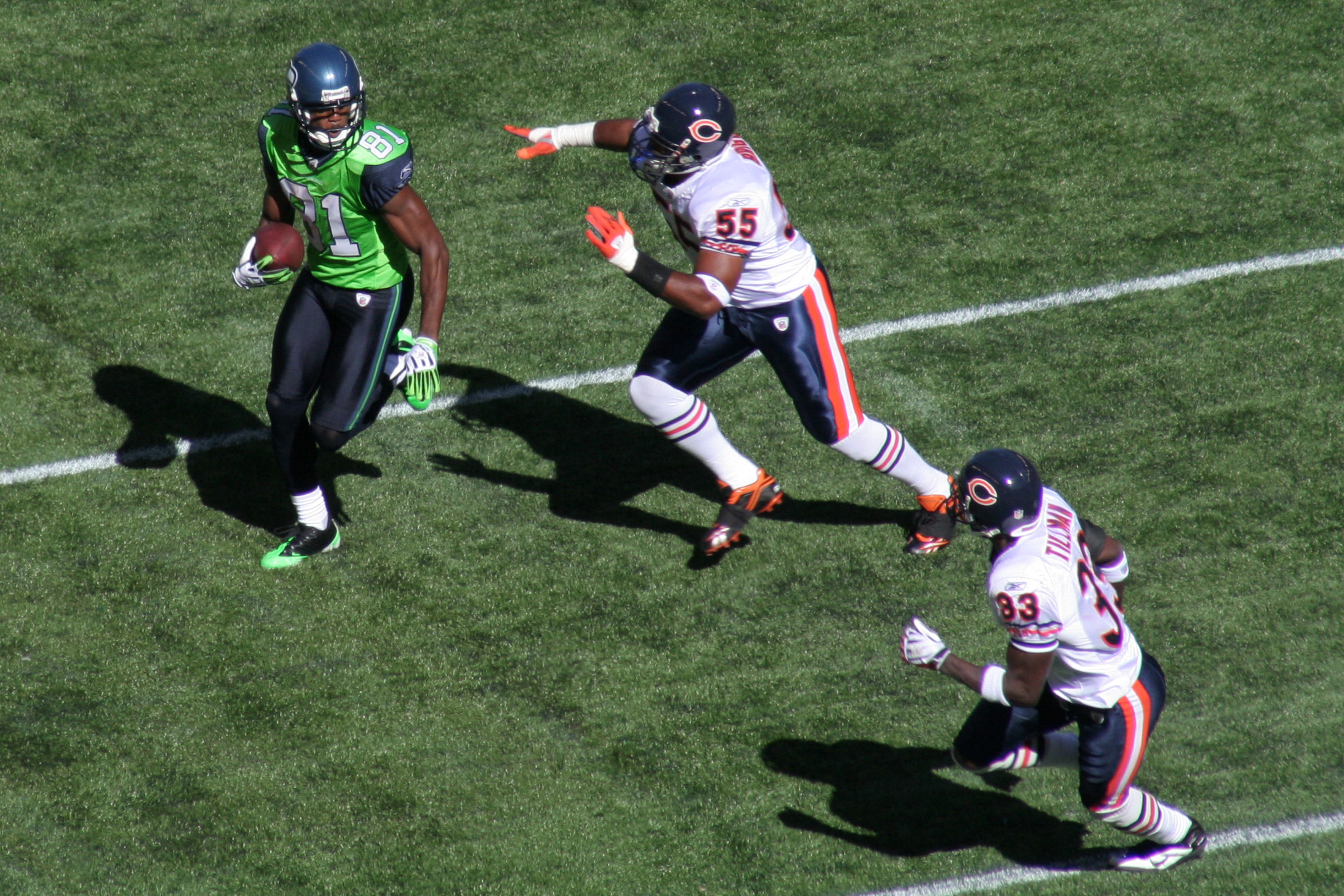
Nate Burleson of the Seahawks tries to get away from Charles Tillman and Lance Briggs

Coming off their home win over the Steelers, the Bears flew to Qwest Field for a Week 3 duel with the Seattle Seahawks. Chicago would trail in the first quarter as quarterback Seneca Wallace completed a 39-yard touchdown pass to running back Julius Jones, followed by kicker Olindo Mare's 46-yard field goal. Seattle would add onto their lead in the second quarter with Mare's 37-yard field goal, yet the Bears would answer with quarterback Jay Cutler's 1-yard touchdown pass to tight end Greg Olsen.

Chicago would take the lead in the third quarter with Cutler's 7-yard touchdown pass to rookie wide receiver Johnny Knox, followed by kicker Robbie Gould's 37-yard field goal. The Seahawks would reply in the fourth quarter with Mare's 39-yard and 46-yard field goal, yet the Bears would prevail as Cutler completed a 36-yard touchdown pass to wide receiver Devin Hester, followed by a 2-point conversion pass to wide receiver Earl Bennett. Afterwards, Chicago's defense would hold on for the win.

With the win, the Bears improved to 2–1.

=== Week 4 ===
Detroit Lions at Chicago Bears

Team	1	2	3	4	Total
Lions	14	7	0	3	24
• Bears	7	14	13	14	48

- Date: October 4
- Location: Soldier Field, Chicago, Illinois
- Game start: 1:00 p.m. EST
- Game attendance: 62,192
- Game weather: Partly cloudy; 53 °F (12 °C)
- Referee: Walt Coleman
- TV announcers (Fox): Thom Brennaman, Brian Billick, and Charissa Thompson

Scoring summary
Q1	10:50	DET	Kevin Smit 1 yard run (Jason Hanson kick)	DET 7–0
Q1	8:51	CHI	Jay Cutler 5-yard run (Robbie Gould kick)	Tie 7–7
Q1	5:03	DET	Will Heller 14-yard pass from Matthew Stafford (Jason Hanson kick)	DET 14–7
Q2	14:14	CHI	Kellen Davis 2-yard pass from Jay Cutler (Robbie Gould kick)	Tie 14–14
Q2	10:54	CHI	Greg Olsen 1 yard pass from Jay Cutler (Robbie Gould kick)	CHI 21–14
Q2	:26	DET	Kevin Smith 5-yard run (Jason Hanson kick)	Tie 21–21
Q3	14:48	CHI	Johnny Knox 102-yard kickoff return (Robbie Gould kick)	CHI 28–21
Q3	10:18	CHI	Robbie Gould 52-yard field goal	CHI 31–21
Q3	2:33	CHI	Robbie Gould 22-yard field goal	CHI 34–21
Q4	8:15	DET	Jason Hanson 35-yard field goal	CHI 34–24
Q4	6:46	CHI	Matt Forte 37-yard run (Robbie Gould kick)	CHI 41–24
Q4	1:57	CHI	Garrett Wolfe 2-yard run (Robbie Gould kick)	CHI 48–24

Coming off their road win over the Seahawks, the Bears went home for a Week 4 NFC North duel with the Detroit Lions. Chicago surprisingly trailed early in the first quarter as Lions running back Kevin Smith got a 1-yard touchdown run. The Bears would answer with quarterback Jay Cutler's 5-yard touchdown run, yet Detroit came right back with quarterback Matthew Stafford's 14-yard touchdown pass to tight end Will Heller. Chicago would take the lead in the second quarter with Cutler's 2-yard touchdown pass to tight end Kellen Davis and a 1-yard touchdown pass to tight end Greg Olsen, yet the Lions would tie the game prior to halftime with Smith's 3-yard touchdown run.

The Bears would start the third quarter with a bang as rookie wide receiver Johnny Knox returned the half's opening kickoff 102 yards for a touchdown. Later on, kicker Robbie Gould would add onto Chicago's lead with a 52-yard and a 22-yard field goal. Detroit tried to rally in the fourth quarter with kicker Jason Hanson's 35-yard field goal, yet the Bears pulled away with running back Matt Forté's 37-yard touchdown run and running back Garrett Wolfe's 2-yard touchdown run.

With the win, Chicago would enter its bye week at 3–1.

=== Week 6 ===
Chicago Bears at Atlanta Falcons

Team	1	2	3	4	Total
Bears	0	7	0	7	14
• Falcons	0	14	0	7	21

- Date: October 18
- Location: Georgia Dome, Atlanta, Georgia
- Game start: 8:20 p.m. EST
- Game attendance: 68,082
- Game weather: Indoors (dome)
- Referee: Terry McAulay
- TV announcers (NBC): Al Michaels, Cris Collinsworth, and Andrea Kremer

Scoring summary
Q1	14:54	CHI	Johnny Knox 23-yard pass from Jay Cutler (Robbie Gould kick)	CHI 7–0
Q1	9:03	ATL	Roddy White 40-yard pass from Matt Ryan (Jason Elam kick)	Tie 7–7
Q1	:04	ATL	Tony Gonzalez 10-yard pass from Matt Ryan (Jason Elam kick)	ATL 14–7
Q4	6:14	CHI	Greg Olsen 2-yard pass from Jay Cutler (Robbie Gould kick)	Tie 14–14
Q4	3:06	ATL	Michael Turner 5-yard run (Jason Elam kick)	ATL 21–14

Coming off their bye week, the Bears flew to the Georgia Dome for a Week 6 Sunday night duel with the Atlanta Falcons. Following a scoreless first quarter, Chicago delivered the game's opening strike in the second quarter with quarterback Jay Cutler completing a 23-yard touchdown pass to rookie wide receiver Johnny Knox. However, the Falcons would respond with quarterback Matt Ryan hooking up with wide receiver Roddy White on a 40-yard touchdown pass and finding tight end Tony Gonzalez on a 10-yard touchdown.

After a scoreless third quarter, the Bears tied the game in the fourth quarter with Cutler hooking up with tight end Greg Olsen on a 2-yard touchdown pass. However, Atlanta struck back with a 5-yard touchdown run from running back Michael Turner. Cutler would get Chicago's offense deep into Falcon territory, but Atlanta's defense would spoil the comeback.

With the loss, the Bears fell to 3–2.

=== Week 7 ===
Chicago Bears at Cincinnati Bengals

Team	1	2	3	4	Total
Bears	0	3	0	7	10
• Bengals	14	17	7	7	45

- Date: October 25
- Location: Paul Brown Stadium, Cincinnati, Ohio
- Game start: 4:15 p.m. EST
- Game attendance: 64,900
- Game weather: Cloudy; 61 °F (16 °C)
- Referee: Walt Anderson
- TV announcers (Fox): Sam Rosen, Tim Ryan, and Laura Okmin

Scoring summary
Q1	11:00	CIN	Chris Henry 9-yard pass from Carson Palmer (Shayne Graham kick)	CIN 7–0
Q1	1:07	CIN	Chad Ochocinco 8-yard pass from Carson Palmer (Shayne Graham kick)	CIN 14–0
Q2	11:14	CIN	J.P. Foschi 3-yard pass from Carson Palmer (Shayne Graham kick)	CIN 21–0
Q2	2:49	CIN	Lavernaues Coles 8-yard pass from Carson Palmer (Shayne Graham kick)	CIN 28–0
Q2	1:10	CIN	Shayne Graham 29-yard field goal	CIN 31–0
Q2	:00	CHI	Robbie Gould 22-yard field goal	CIN 31–3
Q3	4:48	CIN	Chad Ochocinco 13-yard pass from Carson Palmer (Shayne Graham kick)	CIN 38–3
Q4	14:57	CIN	Cedric Benson 1 yard run (Shayne Graham kick)	CIN 45–3
Q4	11:48	CHI	Devin Hester 5-yard pass from Jay Cutler (Robbie Gould kick)	CIN 45–10

Hoping to rebound from their Sunday night road loss to the Falcons, the Bears flew to Paul Brown Stadium for a Week 7 interconference duel with the Cincinnati Bengals. Chicago would trail early in the first quarter as Bengals quarterback Carson Palmer found wide receiver Chris Henry on a 9-yard touchdown pass and wide receiver Chad Ochocinco on an 8-yard touchdown pass. Things continued to get worse for the Bears as Palmer completed a 3-yard touchdown pass to tight end J.P. Foschi and an 8-yard touchdown pass to wide receiver Laveranues Coles, followed by a 29-yard field goal from kicker Shayne Graham. Chicago would close out the half as kicker Robbie Gould booted a 22-yard field goal.

Afterwards, Cincinnati would pull away with Palmer finding Ochocinco again on a 13-yard touchdown pass in the third quarter and former Bears running back Cedric Benson getting a 1-yard touchdown run in the fourth quarter. Chicago would end the game with quarterback Jay Cutler's 5-yard touchdown pass to wide receiver Devin Hester.

With the loss, the Bears fell to 3–3. As of 2025, this marks the last time the Bears lost to the Bengals.

=== Week 8 ===
Cleveland Browns at Chicago Bears

Team	1	2	3	4	Total
Browns	0	0	6	0	6
• Bears	6	10	7	7	30

- Date: November 1
- Location: Soldier Field, Chicago, Illinois
- Game start: 1:00 p.m. EST
- Game attendance: 62,262
- Game weather: Partly cloudy; 50 °F (10 °C)
- Referee: Alberto Riveron
- TV announcers (CBS): Kevin Harlan and Solomon Wilcots

Scoring summary
Q1	2:20	CHI	Robbie Gould 37-yard field goal	CHI 3–0
Q1	1:13	CHI	Robbie Gould 29-yard field goal	CHI 6–0
Q2	8:43	CHI	Robbie Gould 32-yard field goal	CHI 9–0
Q2	1:56	CHI	Matt Forte 1 yard run (Robbie Gould kick)	CHI 16–0
Q3	10:33	CLE	Derek Anderson 1 yard run (kick blocked)	CHI 16–6
Q3	1:42	CHI	Matt Forte 10-yard run (Robbie Gould kick)	CHI 23–6
Q4	3:14	CHI	Charles Tillman 21-yard interception return (Robbie Gould kick)	CHI 30–6

Hoping to rebound from their horrendous road loss to the Bengals, the Bears went home for a Week 8 interconference duel with the Cleveland Browns. Before the game, a pregame ceremony was held for the late Walter Payton, who died exactly 10 years ago on November 1.

Chicago got off to a fast start in the first quarter as kicker Robbie Gould made a 37-yard and a 29-yard field goal. In the second quarter, the Bears would add onto their lead as Gould booted a 32-yard field goal, followed by running back Matt Forté got a 1-yard touchdown run. In the third quarter, the Browns would get onto their board with a 1-yard touchdown run by quarterback Derek Anderson (with a blocked PAT). Afterwards, Chicago would continue their dominating day with a 10-yard touchdown run by Forté. The Bears would then close out the game in the fourth quarter with cornerback Charles Tillman returning an interception 21 yards for a touchdown.

With the win, Chicago improved to 4–3.

=== Week 9 ===
Arizona Cardinals at Chicago Bears

Team	1	2	3	4	Total
• Cardinals	14	17	3	7	41
Bears	7	0	0	14	21

- Date: November 8
- Location: Soldier Field, Chicago, Illinois
- Game start: 1:00 p.m. EST
- Game attendance: 62,309
- Game weather: Partly cloudy; 65 °F (18 °C)
- Referee: Ed Hochuli
- TV announcers (Fox): Joe Buck, Troy Aikman, and Pam Oliver

Scoring summary
Q1	12:12	ARI	Larry Fitzgerald 11-yard pass from Kurt Warner (Neil Rackers kick)	ARI 7–0
Q1	9:13	CHI	Greg Olsen 33-yard pass from Jay Cutler (Robbie Gould kick)	Tie 7–7
Q1	3:26	ARI	Ben Patrick 6-yard pass from Kurt Warner (Neil Rackers kick)	ARI 14–7
Q2	11:19	ARI	Larry Fitzgerald 17-yard pass from Kurt Warner (Neil Rackers kick)	ARI 21–7
Q2	2:49	ARI	Anthony Becht 15-yard pass from Kurt Warner (Neil Rackers kick)	ARI 28–7
Q2	:00	ARI	Neil Rackers 43-yard field goal	ARI 31–7
Q3	7:46	ARI	Neil Rackers 30-yard field goal	ARI 34–7
Q4	11:50	CHI	Greg Olsen 3-yard pass from Jay Cutler (Robbie Gould kick)	ARI 34–14
Q4	9:04	CHI	Greg Olsen 20-yard pass from Jay Cutler (Robbie Gould kick)	ARI 34–21
Q4	4:30	ARI	Steve Breaston 4-yard pass from Kurt Warner (Neil Rackers kick)	ARI 41–21

Coming off their win over the Browns, the Bears stayed at home for a Week 9 duel with the Arizona Cardinals. Chicago would trail early in the first quarter as Cardinals quarterback Kurt Warner hooked up with wide receiver Larry Fitzgerald on an 11-yard touchdown pass. The Bears would answer as quarterback Jay Cutler competed a 33-yard touchdown pass to tight end Greg Olsen, but Arizona came right back as Warner hooked up with tight end Ben Patrick on a 6-yard touchdown pass. Chicago would find themselves in a huge deficit in the second quarter as Warner completed a 17-yard touchdown pass to Fitzpatrick and a 15-yard touchdown pass to tight end Anthony Becht, followed by kicker Neil Rackers nailing a 43-yard field goal.

The Cardinals would add onto their lead as Rackers booted a 30-yard field goal in the third quarter. The Bears tried to rally in the fourth quarter as Cutler connected with Olsen on a 3-yard and a 20-yard touchdown pass, but Arizona pulled away with Warner completing a 4-yard touchdown pass to wide receiver Steve Breaston.

With the loss, Chicago fell to 4–4.

=== Week 10 ===
Chicago Bears at San Francisco 49ers

Team	1	2	3	4	Total
Bears	0	3	3	0	6
• 49ers	0	7	0	3	10

- Date: November 12
- Location: Candlestick Park, San Francisco, California
- Game start: 8:20 p.m. EST
- Game attendance: 69,732
- Game weather: Mostly clear; 60 °F (16 °C)
- Referee: Ron Winter
- TV announcers (NFLN): Bob Papa and Matt Millen

Scoring summary
Q2	2:03	SF	Frank Gore 14-yard run (Joe Nedney kick)	SF 7–0
Q2	:02	CHI	Robbie Gould 50-yard field goal	SF 7–3
Q3	7:27	CHI	Robbie Gould 38-yard field goal	SF 7–6
Q4	10:11	SF	Joe Nedney 21-yard field goal	SF 10–6

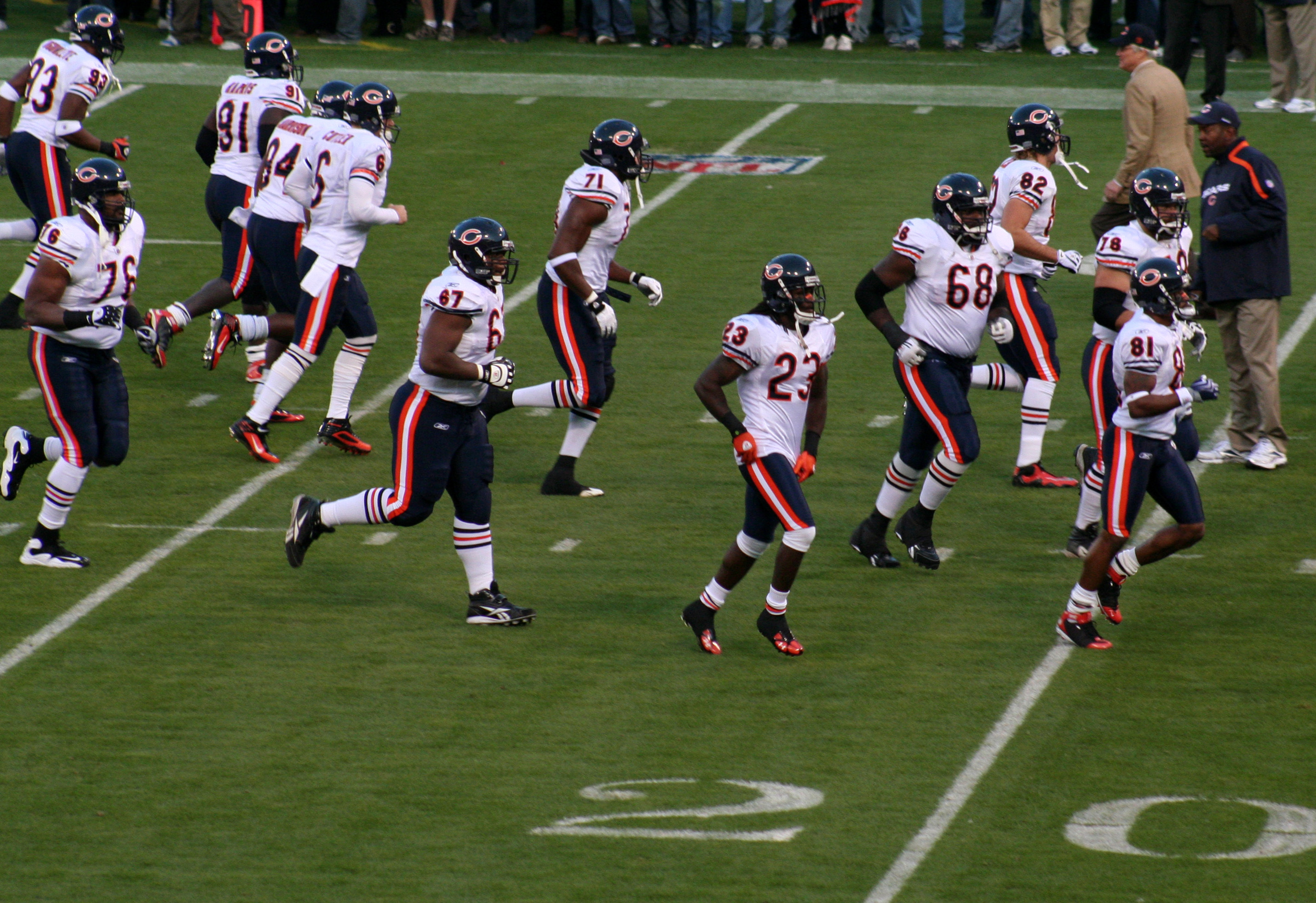
The Bears run onto the field before their game against the 49ers

Hoping to rebound from a miserable home loss to the Cardinals, the Bears flew to Candlestick Park for a Week 10 Thursday night duel with the San Francisco 49ers, led by head coach Mike Singletary (former Bears linebacker).

After a scoreless first quarter, Chicago would trail in the second quarter as 49ers running back Frank Gore got a 14-yard touchdown run. The Bears would close out the half with a 50-yard field goal from kicker Robbie Gould. In the third quarter, Chicago would inch closer with Gould's 38-yard field goal. In the fourth quarter, San Francisco would answer with kicker Joe Nedney making a 21-yard field goal. The Bears would get have a late game drive go deep into 49er territory, but an interception by safety Michael Lewis ended any hope of a win.

With the loss, the Bears fell to 4–5.

Quarterback Jay Cutler (29/52 for 307 yards) would throw for a career-worst 5 interceptions in one game.

=== Week 11 ===
Philadelphia Eagles at Chicago Bears

Team	1	2	3	4	Total
• Eagles	10	0	7	7	24
Bears	0	9	11	0	20

- Date: November 22
- Location: Soldier Field, Chicago, Illinois
- Game start: 8:20 p.m. EST
- Game attendance: 62,421
- Game weather: Cloudy; 47 °F (8 °C)
- Referee: Tony Corrente
- TV announcers (NBC): Al Michaels, Cris Collinsworth, and Andrea Kremer

Scoring summary
Q1	10:54	PHI	David Akers 25-yard field goal	PHI 3–0
Q1	2:48	PHI	Jason Avant 13-yard pass from Donovan McNabb (David Akers kick)	PHI 10–0
Q2	14:45	CHI	Robbie Gould 45-yard field goal	PHI 10–3
Q2	9:59	CHI	Robbie Gould 28-yard field goal	PHI 10–6
Q2	:13	CHI	Robbie Gould 28-yard field goal	PHI 10–9
Q3	10:26	CHI	Robbie Gould 49-yard field goal	CHI 12–10
Q3	5:53	PHI	DeSean Jackson 48-yard pass from Donovan McNabb (David Akers kick)	PHI 17–12
Q3	2:52	CHI	Kellen Davis 15-yard pass from Jay Cutler (Matt Forte pass from Jay Cutler)	CHI 20–17
Q4	5:31	PHI	LeSean McCoy 10-yard run (David Akers kick)	PHI 24–20

=== Week 12 ===
Chicago Bears at Minnesota Vikings

Team	1	2	3	4	Total
Bears	0	7	3	0	10
• Vikings	0	24	3	9	36

- Date: November 29
- Location: Mall of America Field, Minneapolis, Minnesota
- Game start: 4:15 p.m. EST
- Game attendance: 63,854
- Game weather: Indoors (dome)
- Referee: Walt Coleman
- TV announcers (Fox): Joe Buck, Troy Aikman, and Pam Oliver

Scoring summary
Q2	14:56	MIN	Percy Harvin 15-yard pass from Brett Favre (Ryan Longwell kick)	MIN 7–0
Q2	12:12	CHI	Johnny Knox 24-yard pass from Jay Cutler (Robbie Gould kick)	Tie 7–7
Q2	8:06	MIN	Chester Taylor 10-yard pass from Brett Favre (Ryan Longwell kick)	MIN 14–7
Q2	7:02	MIN	Ryan Longwell 52-yard field goal	MIN 17–7
Q2	:17	MIN	Visanthe Shiancoe 6-yard pass from Brett Favre (Ryan Longwell kick)	MIN 24–7
Q3	12:44	CHI	Robbie Gould 38-yard field goal	MIN 24–10
Q3	7:45	MIN	Ryan Longwell 37-yard field goal	MIN 27–10
Q4	13:36	MIN	Ryan Longwell 20-yard field goal	MIN 30–10
Q4	6:35	MIN	Adrian Peterson 5-yard run (run failed)	MIN 36–10

=== Week 13 ===
St. Louis Rams at Chicago Bears

Team	1	2	3	4	Total
Rams	0	3	3	3	9
• Bears	10	0	7	0	17

- Date: December 6
- Location: Soldier Field, Chicago, Illinois
- Game start: 1:00 p.m. EST
- Game weather: Cloudy; 36 °F (2 °C)
- TV announcers (Fox): Dick Stockton and Trent Green

=== Week 14 ===
Green Bay Packers at Chicago Bears

Team	1	2	3	4	Total
• Packers	10	3	0	8	21
Bears	0	7	7	0	14

- Date: December 13
- Location: Soldier Field, Chicago, Illinois
- Game start: 1:00 p.m. EST
- Television network: Fox

=== Week 15 ===
Chicago Bears at Baltimore Ravens

Team	1	2	3	4	Total
Bears	0	7	0	0	7
• Ravens	14	0	17	0	31

- Date: December 20
- Location: M&T Bank Stadium, Baltimore, Maryland
- Game start: 4:15 p.m. EST
- Game weather: Sunny; 32 °F (0 °C)
- TV announcers (Fox): Thom Brennaman and Brian Billick

=== Week 16 ===
Minnesota Vikings at Chicago Bears

Team	1	2	3	4	OT	Total
Vikings	0	0	13	17	0	30
• Bears	3	13	7	7	6	36

- Date: December 28
- Location: Soldier Field, Chicago, Illinois
- Game start: 8:30 p.m. EST
- Game attendance: 62,479
- Game weather: Partly cloudy; 26 °F (−3 °C)
- Referee: Gene Steratore
- TV announcers (ESPN): Mike Tirico, Ron Jaworski, and Jon Gruden

Scoring summary
Q1	7:24	CHI	Robbie Gould 22-yard field goal	CHI 3–0
Q2	13:23	CHI	Robbie Gould 42-yard field goal	CHI 6–0
Q2	5:56	CHI	Greg Olsen 7-yard pass from Jay Cutler (Robbie Gould kick)	CHI 13–0
Q2	:00	CHI	Robbie Gould 41-yard field goal	CHI 16–0
Q3	8:17	MIN	Adrian Peterson 1 yard run (kick blocked)	CHI 16–6
Q3	6:30	CHI	Desmond Clark 2-yard pass from Jay Cutler (Robbie Gould kick)	CHI 23–6
Q3	1:18	MIN	Visanthe Shiancoe 6-yard pass from Brett Favre (Ryan Longwell kick)	CHI 23–13
Q4	12:10	MIN	Ryan Longwell 41-yard field goal	CHI 23–16
Q4	5:49	MIN	Adrian Peterson 1 yard run (Ryan Longwell kick)	Tie 23–23
Q4	4:55	CHI	Earl Bennett 20-yard pass from Jay Cutler (Robbie Gould kick)	CHI 30–23
Q4	:16	MIN	Sidney Rice 6-yard pass from Brett Favre (Ryan Longwell kick)	Tie 30–30
OT	9:15	CHI	Devin Aromashodu 39-yard pass from Jay Cutler	CHI 36–30

=== Week 17 ===
Chicago Bears at Detroit Lions

Team	1	2	3	4	Total
• Bears	3	10	7	17	37
Lions	3	7	3	10	23

- Date: January 3
- Location: Ford Field, Detroit, Michigan
- Game start: 1:00 p.m. EST
- Game weather: Indoors (dome)
- TV announcers (Fox): Chris Myers, Trent Green, & Jennifer Hammond
