= Jaron =

Jaron is a given name and surname. Notable people with the name include:

== Given name ==
- Jaron Blossomgame (born 1993), American basketball player in the Israeli Basketball Premier League
- Jaron Brown (born 1990), American football wide receiver for the Arizona Cardinals of the National Football League (NFL)
- JaRon Harris (born 1986), former American football wide receiver
- Jaron Johnson (born 1992), American professional basketball player for the Rio Grande Valley Vipers of the NBA Development League
- Jaron Lanier (born 1960), American computer philosophy writer, computer scientist, visual artist, and composer of classical music
- Jaron Long (born 1991), American professional baseball pitcher with the Washington Nationals organization
- Jaron Lowenstein (born 1974), American singer, recorded with his identical twin brother Evan in the musical duo Evan and Jaron
- Jaron Marquis (born 1983), American hip-hop musician based in Indianapolis, Indiana
- JaRon Rush (born 1979), retired American professional basketball small forward from Kansas City, Missouri
- Jaron Schäfer (born 1993), German footballer
- Ja'Ron Smith, American White House aide
- Jaron Soininen of Universum, a heavy metal band from Adelaide, South Australia
- Jaron Tibbs (born 2005), American football player

== Surname ==
- Dov Jaron, American engineer
- Damian Jaroń (born 1990), Polish footballer

== See also ==
- Jaren (given name)
- Jarron, given name
- Yaron
- Jaron Cliffs, a line of steep, snow-covered cliffs on the south side of Mount Takahe, in Marie Byrd Land, Antarctica
- Aron (disambiguation)
- Jaro (disambiguation)
- Jaronty
