= Yaron =

Yaron (Hebrew: יָרוֹן) is a Hebrew name meaning "is full of joy", "will be full of joy", or "to shout, to sing". It is common in Israel as both a male first name and a surname. Its English-language equivalent is Jaron.

Notable people with the first name Yaron include:

- Yaron Brook (born 1961), Israeli-American entrepreneur, writer, and activist, former CEO of the Ayn Rand Institute
- Yaron Brown (born 1958), Israeli soccer player
- Yaron Golan (1949–2007), Israeli publisher
- Yaron Herman (born 1981), Israeli-French jazz pianist
- Yaron Kohlberg (born 1983), Israeli classical pianist
- Yaron Lifschitz (born 1970), Australian theatre director
- Yaron Lischinsky, German-Israeli victim of a 2025 shooting
- Yaron London (born 1940), Israeli media personality
- Yaron Margolin (born 1954), Israeli dancer and choreographer
- Yaron Matras (born 1963), British linguist
- Yaron Svoray, Israeli author and investigative journalist
- Yaron Traub (born 1964), Israeli conductor and pianist
- Yaron Zilberman (born 1966), Israeli film director
- Yarone Zober (born 1975), Israeli-American politician and acting mayor, for a time, of Pittsburgh, Pennsylvania

Notable people with the surname Yaron include:

- Amos Yaron (born 1940), Israeli general accused of complicity in the Sabra and Shatila massacre
- Hagit Messer Yaron (born 1953), Israeli electrical engineer, businesswoman, and President of Open University of Israel
- Ido Yaron, Israeli DJ and founder of Utopia Records
- Miriam Yaron, Miss Israel 1950

== See also ==
- Jaron
- Jerome
