= Jarron =

Jarron is a given name. Notable people with the name include:

- Jarron Collins (born 1978), American basketball coach and former player
- Jarron Cumberland (born 1997), American basketball player
- Jarron Gilbert (born 1986), American former football player

== See also ==
- Jaron, given name and surname
- Jarren, given name
