= Jaren (given name) =

Jaren or Jarren is a given name.

== People ==
- Jarren Benton (born 1981), American rapper and songwriter
- Jaren Cerf (born 1983), American singer and songwriter
- Jarren Duran (born 1996), American baseball player
- Jarren Garcia (born 2006), Filipino-British model
- Jaren Hall (born 1998), American football player
- Jaren Jackson (born 1967), American basketball coach and former player
- Jaren Jackson Jr. (born 1999), American basketball player
- Jaren Johnston (born 1980), American singer and songwriter
- Jaren Kanak (born 2004), American football player
- Jaren Kump (born 2000), American football player
- Jaren Lewison (born 2000), American actor
- Jaren Sina (born 1994), Kosovan-American basketball player
- Jarren Williams (disambiguation), multiple people

== See also ==
- Jaron, given name and surname
- Jarron, given name
