= Asiata =

Asiata is a surname. Notable people with the surname include:

- Isaac Asiata (born 1992), American football player
- Johan Asiata (born 1985), American football player
- John Asiata (born 1993), Australian rugby league player
- Matt Asiata (born 1987), American football player
- Patrick Asiata (born 1985), Samoan footballer
- Richie Asiata (born 1996), Australian rugby player
- Luana Asiata New Zealand abstract artist
