= Pisa Tinoisamoa =

American football player (born 1981)

No. 50, 59
- Position: Linebacker

Personal information
- Born: July 15, 1981 (age 45); San Diego, California, U.S.
- Listed height: 6 ft 1 in (1.85 m)
- Listed weight: 230 lb (104 kg)

Career information
- High school: Vista (Vista, California)
- College: Hawaii
- NFL draft: 2003: 2nd round, 43rd overall pick

Career history
- St. Louis Rams (2003–2008); Chicago Bears (2009–2010)

Awards and highlights
- PFWA All-Rookie Team (2003); First-team All-WAC (2002); Second-team All-WAC (2001)

Career NFL statistics
- Total tackles: 494
- Sacks: 11
- Forced fumbles: 10
- Fumble recoveries: 3
- Interceptions: 7
- Stats at Pro Football Reference

Apisaloma Donald "Pisa" Tinoisamoa (/ˈpiːsə tiːnɔɪˈsɑːmoʊ.ə/; born July 15, 1981) is an American former professional football player who was a linebacker in the National Football League (NFL). He played college football for the Hawaii Warriors. He was selected by the St. Louis Rams in the second round of the 2003 NFL draft.

== Early life ==
Tinoisamoa attended Vista High School in Vista, California. In football, he was a three-time All-Palomar League, a three-time All-CIF pick, an All-American pick as a senior, and a three-time All-State selection and an All-American running back. His 1996, '97, and '98 Panther football teams won the Palomar League and CIF titles. As a senior, Tinoisamoa recorded 75 tackles (12 for loss), six sacks, and three fumble recoveries (one for a score) and offensively, rushed for 1,600 yards and 23 touchdowns and he became the first-ever player ever in San Diego County history to make First-team All-CIF on both offense and defense.

== College career ==
At the University of Hawaii, Tinoisamoa recorded 289 tackles (210 solo) with 15.5 sacks, 11 QB pressures, six forced fumbles, two fumble recoveries, nine passes defensed, two interceptions, and one blocked field goal while starting 27 of 35 games for Rainbow Warriors.

He was a First-team All-Western Athletic Conference pick and was the recipient of the Alec Waterhouse Award, given to team's Most Valuable Player as he led team with career-high 129 tackles (89 solo), with 6.5 sacks, 18 tackles for loss, eight QB pressures, two interceptions, five passes defensed, one forced fumble, one fumble recovery, and blocked kick. He was named Second-team All-WAC as junior when he tallied 86 tackles (67 solos) with five sacks, 11 tackles for loss, four QB pressures, three passes defensed, and three forced fumbles. As sophomore, he recorded 74 tackles (54 solos), four sacks, 10 tackles for loss, two forced fumbles, one fumble recovery, five passes defensed, and four QB pressures. He did not play as freshman.

== Professional career ==
Pre-draft measurables
Height	Weight	40-yard dash	10-yard split	20-yard split	20-yard shuttle	Three-cone drill	Vertical jump	Broad jump	Bench press	Wonderlic
6 ft 0 3/8 in (1.84 m)	231 lb (105 kg)	4.65 s	1.62 s	2.19 s	4.07 s	6.97 s	34 1/2 in (0.88 m)	9 ft 3 in (2.82 m)	19 reps	28
All values from NFL Combine

=== St. Louis Rams ===
Tinoisamoa was selected out of the University of Hawaii by the St. Louis Rams in the second round (43rd overall) of the 2003 NFL draft. On July 24, 2003, Tinoisamoa signed a four-year $2.90 million contract with the Rams.

In his rookie season he played in all 16 games and finished the season with 76 tackles, two sacks and three interceptions. He was the first Rams rookie to lead the team in tackles.

The following season, he recorded a career-high 95 tackles and 1.5 sacks. In 2005, he led the team tackles for the third straight season, recording 94. He also recorded 1.5 sacks and two interceptions.

On October 11, 2006, he signed a five-year $24.7 million contract extension with the Rams. The 2006 season saw him play in 11 games after breaking his hand versus the Chicago Bears on December 11. He finished the campaign with 36 tackles and two sacks. In 2007, he recorded 40 tackles and two interceptions in 9 games. Hand, knee, shoulder, elbow, and ankle injuries struck in '06 and '07, forcing Tinoisamoa to miss 12 of 32 games. But he stayed healthy the following season, playing all 16 games and led the team in tackles.

On May 8, 2009, Tinoisamoa was released by the Rams. Tinoisamoa was scheduled to make a base salary of $3.25 million and count $4.25 million against the cap. Releasing him freed up $2.25 million in cap space.

=== Chicago Bears ===
Tinoisamoa agreed to a one-year contract with the Chicago Bears on May 29, 2009. Pisa was named starting strong-side linebacker in August 2009. He follows Adam Archuleta as another player brought over to the Chicago Bears who was coached under Lovie Smith in St. Louis during Smith's time as defensive coordinator.

Tinoisamoa was placed on Injured Reserve due to a knee injury on December 2, 2009. After the Bears signed linebacker Cato June, Tinoisamoa's jersey number was changed to 49, giving June number 59.

On April 12, 2010, the Bears re-signed Tinoisamoa.

=== NFL statistics ===
Year	Team	GP	COMB	TOTAL	AST	SACK	FF	FR	FR YDS	INT	IR YDS	AVG IR	LNG	TD	PD
2003	STL	16	76	63	13	2.0	5	1	0	3	46	15	29	0	7
2004	STL	16	95	76	19	1.5	0	1	0	0	0	0	0	0	4
2005	STL	16	94	71	23	1.5	0	0	0	2	35	18	20	0	9
2006	STL	11	36	29	7	2.0	0	1	0	0	0	0	0	0	0
2007	STL	9	40	31	9	0.0	2	0	0	2	15	8	15	0	3
2008	STL	16	104	88	16	3.0	2	0	0	0	0	0	0	0	2
2009	CHI	2	4	4	0	0.0	1	0	0	0	0	0	0	0	0
2010	CHI	12	40	33	7	1.0	1	0	0	0	0	0	0	0	1
Totals		98	489	395	94	11.0	11	3	0	7	96	14	29	0	26
