= Jaron Schäfer =

German footballer

Personal information
- Date of birth: 14 July 1993 (age 33)
- Place of birth: Germany
- Height: 1.72 m (5 ft 8 in)
- Position: Left midfielder

Youth career
- –2012: FC Saarbrücken

Senior career*
Years	Team	Apps	(Gls)
2012–2014	FC Saarbrücken II	41	(2)
2013–2014	FC Saarbrücken	3	(0)
2014–2019	FC 08 Homburg	68	(5)
- * Club domestic league appearances and goals

Jaron Schäfer (born 14 July 1993) is a retired German footballer.

== Career ==
Schäfer came through 1. FC Saarbrücken's youth system, and made his debut for the club in a 3–3 draw with Borussia Dortmund II in the 3. Liga February 2013, as a substitute for Markus Pazurek. At the end of the 2013–14 season he signed for FC Homburg.

After 2,5-years with several knee injuries, Schäfer retired at the end of the 2018/19 season at the age of 25. However, he would continue training with FC 08 Homburg and also begin a dual degree in sports economics at the German University for Prevention and Health Management (DHfPG) in Saarbrücken.
