= Yaron Brown =

Israeli footballer and general manager

Yaron Brown ירון בראון
Personal information
- Date of birth: 1958 (age 67–68)
- Place of birth: Petah Tikva, Israel
- Position: Goalkeeper

Team information
- Current team: Hapoel Be'er Sheva

Youth career
- Hapoel Petah Tikva

Senior career*
Years	Team	Apps	(Gls)
1974–1976	Hapoel Petah Tikva	5	(0)
1978–1979	Maccabi Netanya	12	(0)
1979–1981	Maccabi Haifa	47	(0)

International career
- Israel U21
- * Club domestic league appearances and goals

Yaron Brown (Hebrew: ירון בראון) is a former Israeli football player and currently acts as the general manager of Hapoel Be'er Sheva.

== Playing career ==
At the age of 16, Brown was promoted to Hapoel Petah Tikva's first team as a backup for Yitzhak Vissoker. He later played for Macacbi Netanya and Maccabi Haifa.
