= Al Afalava =

American football player (born 1987)

No. 24, 23, 38
- Position: Safety

Personal information
- Born: January 20, 1987 (age 39); Laie, Hawaii, U.S.
- Listed height: 5 ft 11 in (1.80 m)
- Listed weight: 212 lb (96 kg)

Career information
- High school: Kahuku (Kahuku, Hawaii)
- College: Oregon State (2005–2008)
- NFL draft: 2009: 6th round, 190th overall pick

Career history
- Chicago Bears (2009); Indianapolis Colts (2010); Tennessee Titans (2012)

Career NFL statistics
- Total tackles: 73
- Sacks: 2
- Forced fumbles: 1
- Fumble recoveries: 1
- Interceptions: 1
- Stats at Pro Football Reference

Al Mitchell Afalava (born January 20, 1987) is an American former professional football player who was a safety in the National Football League (NFL). He played college football for the Oregon State Beavers and was selected by the Chicago Bears in the sixth round of the 2009 NFL draft. He also played for the Indianapolis Colts and Tennessee Titans.

== Early life ==
Al Afalava was born in Lāʻie, Hawaii, on January 20, 1987. He played high school football at Kahuku High & Intermediate School. As a junior, he led Kahuku to a 10-2 record and an appearance in the semifinals of the 2004 state playoffs. The team, ranked No. 14 in the West, won the Oahu Interscholastic Association. He was named first-team All-State as a senior and led his team to state title and 14-0 record as a junior. He played in the state's Goodwill Football Classic All-Star game and was named a SuperPrep Magazine All-Region team member. As a two-sport athlete, Afalava was given a two-star ranking by Scout.com, which rated him as the second-best defensive back on the Hawaiian Islands.

== College career ==
Afalava was the only true-freshman to start for the Oregon State University Beavers Football team in 2005. He missed two games with a knee injury. He made 32 tackles on the season. His six tackles against WSU included a touchdown saving tackle on tight end Troy Bienemann at the 1-yard line. That same game he forced a fumble that set up a go-ahead touchdown. He made eight tackles in the Civil War rivalry game against the Oregon Ducks.

Afalava started nine times for the Beavers at free safety in 2006, including the last four games. He had 35 tackles for the season. His first career interception came against Arizona State quarterback Rudy Carpenter. He also forced a fumble against Oregon.

In 2007, Afalava was the third-leading tackler on the Beavers football team with 64, including 56 solo tackles. He had a career-high 11 tackles at Arizona State and 10 in the season opener vs. Utah. He recovered two fumbles for the season, both against UCLA, returning one 33 yards in the first quarter for a touchdown. He earned a Pac-10 Honorable Mention.

In the 2008 season, Afalava recorded 36 tackles, two interceptions, and eight pass break-ups. He was selected to a Pac-10 Honorabe Mention for the second year in a row.

== Professional career ==
Afalava was selected by the Chicago Bears in the sixth round (190th overall) of the 2009 NFL draft. During the 2009 NFL season he started 13 games and ranked second on the team with six passes defensed. He recorded 53 tackles, two sacks, a forced fumble and fumble recovery. He was waived by the Bears on September 4, 2010.

Afalava was signed by the Indianapolis Colts on November 23, 2010. During the 2010 NFL season, he appeared in four games on special teams. He was waived on September 3, 2011 in the final preseason roster cutdown.

Afalava signed with the Tennessee Titans as a free agent on January 5, 2012. During the 2012 NFL season he played in 12 games with two starts during the 2012 season. He was waived by the Titans on August 31, 2013.

== Personal life ==
Afalava has four sons with his wife.
