= Joe Clermond =

American football player (born 1984)

No. 58, 53
- Position: Defensive end

Personal information
- Born: November 13, 1984 (age 41); Tampa, Florida, U.S.
- Listed height: 6 ft 2 in (1.88 m)
- Listed weight: 250 lb (113 kg)

Career information
- High school: Tampa (FL) Chamberlain
- College: Pittsburgh
- NFL draft: 2008: undrafted

Career history
- Chicago Bears (2008–2009)*; Florida Tuskers (2010); Chicago Rush (2011); Virginia Destroyers (2011)
- * Offseason or practice squad member only

Awards and highlights
- UFL champion (2011); 2× Second-team All-Big East (2006, 2007)
- Stats at ArenaFan.com

Jocelin "Joe" Clermond, Jr. (born November 13, 1984) is an American former professional football player who was a defensive end in the United Football League (UFL), Arena Football League (AFL), and National Football League (NFL). He was signed by the Chicago Bears as an undrafted free agent in 2008. He played college football at Pittsburgh.

== Early life ==
Joseph Clermond was All-Tampa Tribune Hillsborough County, All-Western Conference American Division after being a two-year starter and three-year letterman for Chamberlain High School and graduated in 2003. He started at linebacker, strong safety and H-back and compiled 101 tackles and six interceptions as a senior. In his junior year Joseph Clermond intercepted seven passes, returning three for touchdowns. He helped his team to Florida 5A playoffs each of his three varsity seasons, including the 2001 state finals.

== College career ==
Clermond played in 46 games, including 25 starts at DE during his career and was credited with 142 tackles (82 solo), 17.5 sacks, 36.5 TFLs and 4 FR in his Pitt career. In 2007 Clermond made 53 tackles (13 for losses) and 10.5 sacks and forced two fumbles and blocked a kick and was named Second-team All-Big East for the second consecutive season. At Pitt, in 2006, he was selected Second-team All-Big East after starting all 12 games at defensive end and had 48 tackles and 16.5 TFLs and 5.5 sacks and two fumble recoveries. He contributed as a reserve defensive end, playing in 10 games and had 14 tackles, five TFLs and two sacks on the year in 2005. In 2004, he played in all 12 games in his first active season and made 27 tackles, two TFLs and one fumble recovery. He redshirted as a true freshman in 2003.

== Professional career ==
=== Pre-draft ===
Pre-draft measurables
Height	Weight	40-yard dash	20-yard shuttle	Three-cone drill	Vertical jump	Broad jump	Bench press
6 ft 2 in (1.88 m)	249 lb (113 kg)	5.15 s	4.73 s	7.61 s	25.5 in (0.65 m)	8 ft 11 in (2.72 m)	20 reps
All values from NFL Combine.

=== Chicago Bears ===
Clermond was signed by the Chicago Bears as an undrafted free agent in 2008. He was waived on September 4, 2009. He was re-signed to the practice squad later in the season, only to be released on December 1, 2009.

=== Virginia Destroyers ===
Clermond was signed by the Virginia Destroyers of the United Football League on June 28, 2011.
