= Matt Toeaina =

American football player (born 1984)

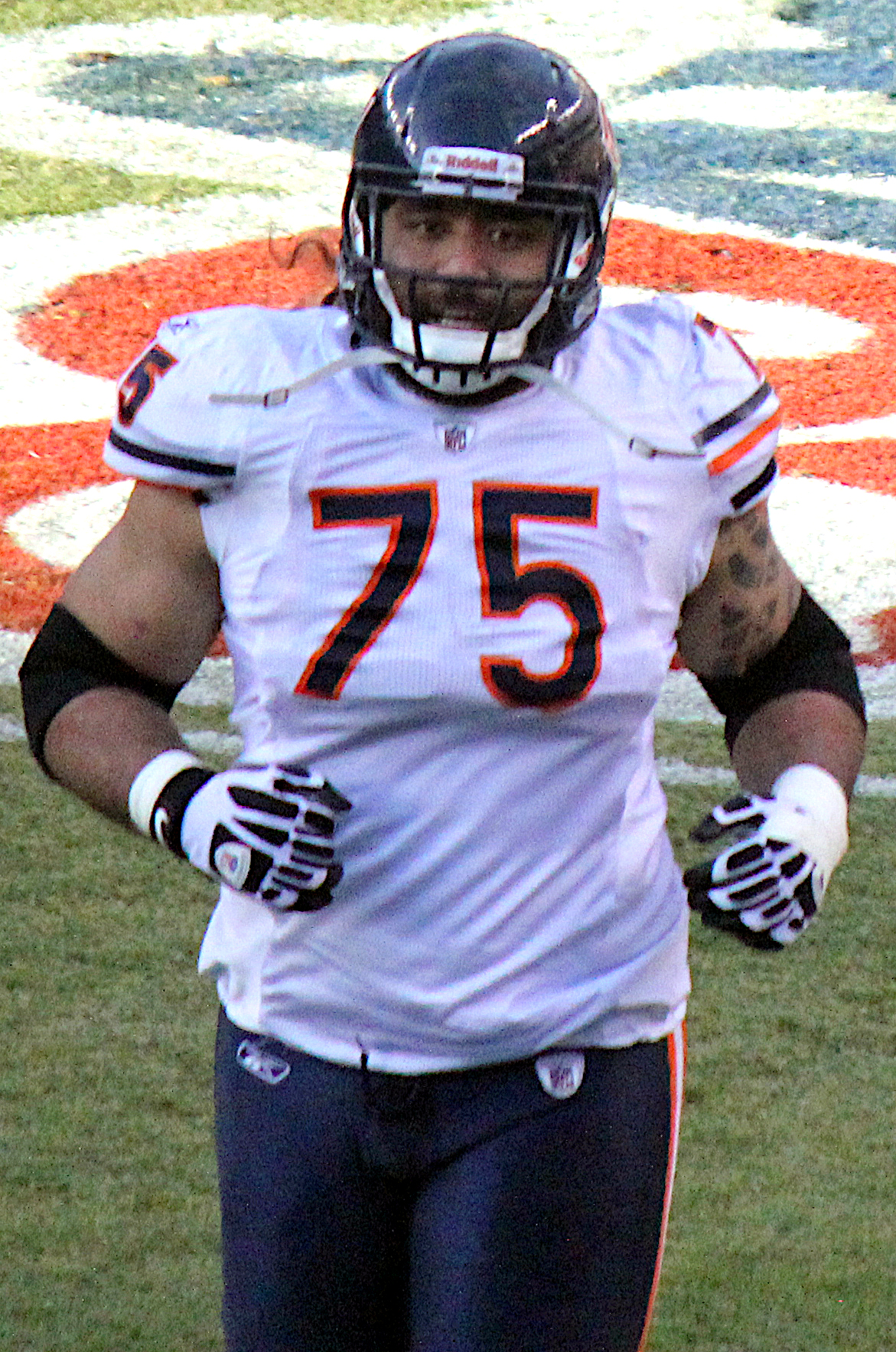
- Toeaina with the Chicago Bears in 2011

No. 75
- Position: Defensive tackle

Personal information
- Born: October 9, 1984 (age 42); San Francisco, California, U.S.
- Listed height: 6 ft 2 in (1.88 m)
- Listed weight: 308 lb (140 kg)

Career information
- High school: Samoana (Utulei, American Samoa)
- College: Oregon
- NFL draft: 2007: 6th round, 187th overall pick

Career history
- Cincinnati Bengals (2007)*; Chicago Bears (2007–2012)
- * Offseason or practice squad member only

Career NFL statistics
- Total tackles: 50
- Sacks: 2
- Fumble recoveries: 1
- Stats at Pro Football Reference

Mataifale Aigafaimeaso'o Toeaina (/toʊˈiːnə/ toh-EE-nə; born October 9, 1984) is an American former professional football player who was a defensive tackle in the National Football League (NFL). He was selected by the Cincinnati Bengals in the sixth round of the 2007 NFL draft, and later played for the Chicago Bears. He is from Pago Pago, American Samoa and played college football for the Oregon Ducks.

== Professional career ==
Pre-draft measurables
Height	Weight	Arm length	Hand span	40-yard dash	10-yard split	20-yard split	20-yard shuttle	Three-cone drill	Vertical jump	Broad jump	Bench press
6 ft 2 in (1.88 m)	307 lb (139 kg)	32 1/2 in (0.83 m)	10 1/2 in (0.27 m)	5.11 s	1.74 s	2.96 s	4.50 s	7.41 s	30.5 in (0.77 m)	8 ft 10 in (2.69 m)	26 reps
All values from NFL Combine/Pro Day

=== Cincinnati Bengals ===
Toeaina was selected by the Cincinnati Bengals in the sixth round of the 2007 NFL draft. In a 2007 preseason game against the Detroit Lions, he returned an interception for 81 yards and a touchdown—an improbable achievement for a 311-pound defensive tackle. Toeaina, however did not make the Bengals final roster, and was signed to their practice squad.

=== Chicago Bears ===
Toeaina was signed by the Chicago Bears to a three-year contract on December 12, 2007.

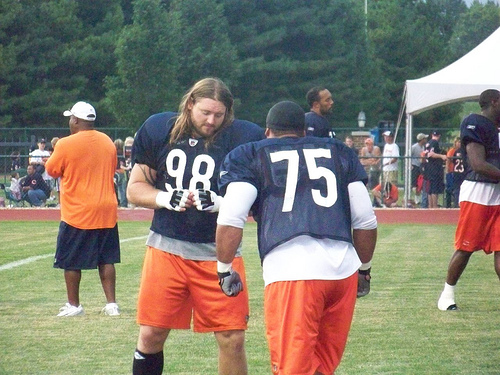
Toeaina and Dusty Dvoracek during training camp in 2008

He saw his first regular season action when the Chicago Bears signed him late in the season. Toeaina registered his first NFL sack against the Philadelphia Eagles on November 28, 2010.

Toeaina signed a 3-year contract extension with the Chicago Bears on December 27, 2010.

On December 17, 2012, Toeaina was placed on injured reserve.

On March 13, 2013, the Bears announced that they will release Toeaina, and was officially released on April 2. Toeaina ended his tenure in Chicago with 24 starts, recording 66 tackles, two sacks, three passes broken up, and one fumble recovery.
