= Jamar Williams =

American gridiron football player (born 1984)

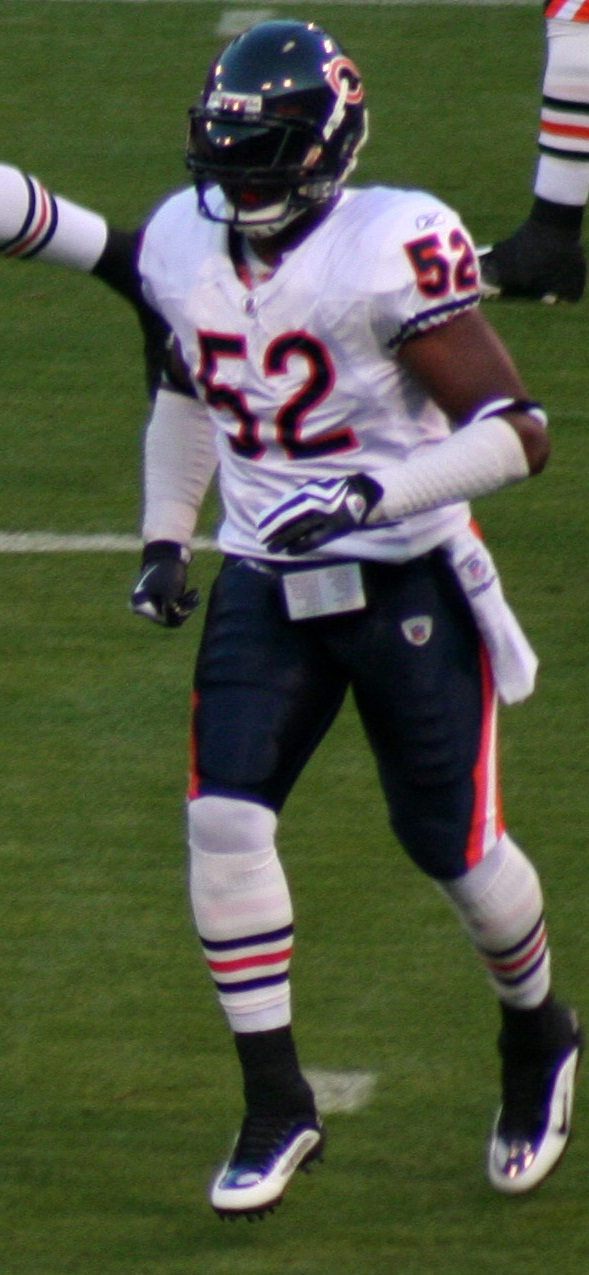
- Williams with the Chicago Bears in 2009

No. 52, 53
- Position: Linebacker

Personal information
- Born: June 14, 1984 (age 42); Houston, Texas, U.S.
- Listed height: 6 ft 0 in (1.83 m)
- Listed weight: 237 lb (108 kg)

Career information
- High school: Langham Creek (Houston)
- College: Arizona State
- NFL draft: 2006: 4th round, 120th overall pick

Career history
- Chicago Bears (2006–2009); Carolina Panthers (2010); Saskatchewan Roughriders (2012)

Career NFL statistics
- Total tackles: 89
- Sacks: 1
- Forced fumbles: 1
- Pass deflections: 5
- Stats at Pro Football Reference

Jamar Williams (born June 14, 1984) is an American former professional football player who was a linebacker in the National Football League (NFL). Williams played college football for the Arizona State Sun Devils. Originally from Houston, Texas, he attended Langham Creek High School. He graduated as a member of the 4-year National Honor Roll. Williams was selected in the fourth round by the Chicago Bears. On April 27, 2010, Williams was traded to the Carolina Panthers for safety Chris Harris.

== Professional career ==
=== NFL ===
Pre-draft measurables
Height	Weight	Arm length	Hand span	40-yard dash	10-yard split	20-yard split	20-yard shuttle	Three-cone drill	Vertical jump	Broad jump	Bench press
6 ft 0 1/4 in (1.84 m)	236 lb (107 kg)	31 1/2 in (0.80 m)	9 in (0.23 m)	4.58 s	1.58 s	2.69 s	4.29 s	6.85 s	37.0 in (0.94 m)	10 ft 4 in (3.15 m)	21 reps
All values from NFL Combine/Pro Day

Williams was selected by the Chicago Bears in the 2006 NFL draft in the fourth round. In four seasons with the Bears, he amassed 89 tackles and one quarterback sack. He was then traded to the Carolina Panthers for the 2010 NFL season. Following the 2010 season, he was released by the Panthers.

=== CFL ===
On March 8, 2012, Williams signed with the Saskatchewan Roughriders of the Canadian Football League (CFL).
