= Kellen Davis =

American football player (born 1985)

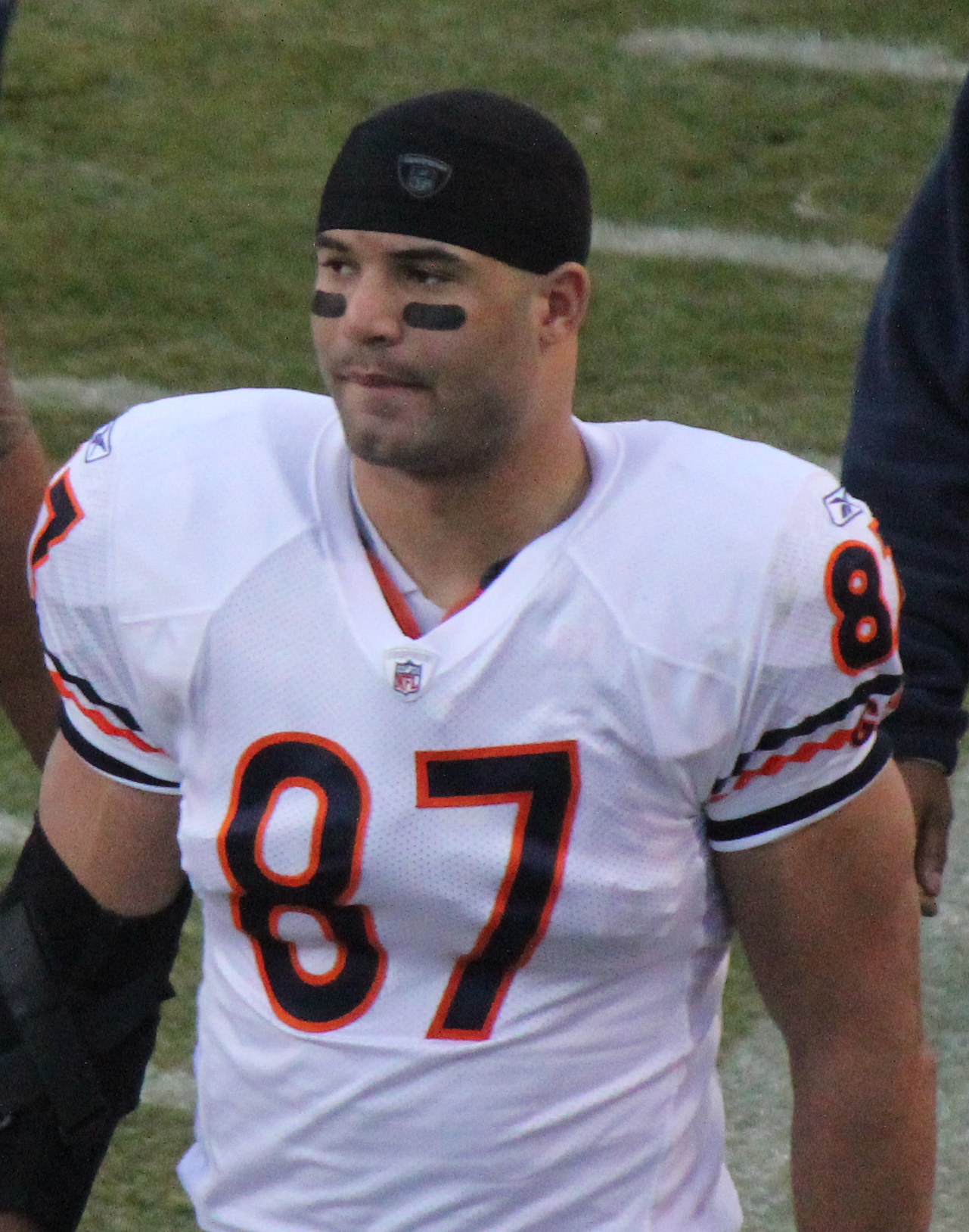
- Davis with the Chicago Bears in 2011

No. 87, 89, 47
- Position: Tight end

Personal information
- Born: October 11, 1985 (age 41); Adrian, Michigan, U.S.
- Listed height: 6 ft 7 in (2.01 m)
- Listed weight: 265 lb (120 kg)

Career information
- High school: Adrian
- College: Michigan State (2004–2007)
- NFL draft: 2008: 5th round, 158th overall pick

Career history
- Chicago Bears (2008–2012); Cleveland Browns (2013)*; Seattle Seahawks (2013); New York Giants (2014)*; Detroit Lions (2014); New York Jets (2015–2016)
- * Offseason or practice squad member only

Awards and highlights
- Super Bowl champion (XLVIII)

Career NFL statistics
- Receptions: 53
- Receiving yards: 579
- Receiving touchdowns: 13
- Stats at Pro Football Reference

Kellen M. Davis (born October 11, 1985) is an American former professional football player who was a tight end in the National Football League (NFL). He was selected by the Chicago Bears in the fifth round of the 2008 NFL draft. He played college football for the Michigan State Spartans.

== College career ==
Davis was ranked among the nation's top 10 tight ends as a high school senior. He played college football at Michigan State University, appearing in 43 games with 22 starts. He was an All Big-Ten honorable mention as a senior and totaled 60 receptions for 789 yards and 9 touchdowns over his career. He was also notable for playing on all three units (offense, defense and special teams) during his senior year.

== Professional career ==
=== Pre-draft ===
Regarded as the most physically imposing tight end of the 2008 NFL draft, concerns over his work ethic and pass production caused him to be projected as a mid-round selection

Pre-draft measurables
Height	Weight	Arm length	Hand span	40-yard dash	10-yard split	20-yard split	20-yard shuttle	Three-cone drill	Vertical jump	Broad jump	Bench press
6 ft 6 1/2 in (1.99 m)	262 lb (119 kg)	32 1/8 in (0.82 m)	9 3/4 in (0.25 m)	4.60 s	1.59 s	2.68 s	4.38 s	7.25 s	34.0 in (0.86 m)	9 ft 10 in (3.00 m)	22 reps
All values from NFL Combine/Pro Day

=== Chicago Bears ===
Davis was selected in the fifth round, 158th overall, by the Chicago Bears in the 2008 NFL draft. He caught his first NFL pass (11 yards) and scored his first touchdown versus the Pittsburgh Steelers on September 20, 2009.

While he appeared in all 48 games in his first three seasons in the league, he was limited to 5 starts due to the lack of skills and the presence of Greg Olsen on the roster, a 1st round draft pick in 2007.

Following the trade of Olsen to the Carolina Panthers in 2011, Davis became the starting tight end. He had 18 receptions for 206 yards and 5 touchdowns in the 2011 season. The 18 receptions marked the first time in 17 years that a Bears tight end failed to record 20 catches.

The production of Davis was argued to have been negatively affected by the offensive style of coordinator Mike Martz.

In 2012, Davis struggled with drops, and caught only 19 passes. On March 13, 2013, he was released by the Bears.

=== Cleveland Browns ===
On March 22, 2013, Davis signed with the Cleveland Browns. He was released on September 1, 2013.

=== Seattle Seahawks ===
On September 11, 2013, Davis signed with the Seattle Seahawks. In the 2013 season, he collected a Super Bowl ring as the Seahawks defeated the Denver Broncos in Super Bowl XLVIII.

=== New York Giants ===
Davis signed with the New York Giants on April 4, 2014. He was released during final roster cuts.

=== Detroit Lions ===
Davis signed with the Detroit Lions on October 20, 2014. He was waived on November 25, 2014 and re-signed on December 10, 2014

=== New York Jets ===
Davis was signed by the New York Jets on March 25, 2015. On March 14, 2016, he was re-signed to a one-year deal. He was waived/injured by the Jets on November 12, 2016, and was placed on injured reserve.
