= Jaro =

Jaro may refer to:

- Jaro Tapal, a character in the video game Star Wars Jedi: Fallen Order
- Jaro, Iloilo City, a district of Iloilo City, Philippines
- Jaro, Indonesia, a subdistrict in Tabalong Regency, South Kalimantan
- Jaro, Leyte, a municipality in the province of Leyte, Philippines
- Jaro Medien (Jaro Media), a German music company
- JARO Records, an American subsidiary of Rank Records Ltd (UK)
- Jaro–Winkler distance
- FF Jaro, a Finnish football club
- Jaro, a character in the book The Letter for the King
- Killamanjaro, nicknamed Jaro, a Reggae sound system

== See also ==
Other places with a similar pronunciation or spelling:

- Haro
- Jarrow
