= Rudy Burgess =

American gridiron football player (born 1984)

No. 39
- Position: Wide receiver

Personal information
- Born: September 19, 1984 (age 42); Brooklyn, New York
- Listed height: 5 ft 10 in (1.78 m)
- Listed weight: 186 lb (84 kg)

Career information
- College: Arizona State
- NFL draft: 2008: undrafted

Career history
- Indianapolis Colts (2008)*; New York Jets (2008)*; Chicago Bears (2008–2009)*; Edmonton Eskimos (2010)*; Arizona Rattlers (2011)*
- * Offseason or practice squad member only

Career NFL statistics
- Receptions: --
- Receiving yards: --
- Touchdowns: --
- Stats at Pro Football Reference

Rudolph Donnavon "Rudy" Burgess (born September 19, 1984) is a former gridiron football wide receiver. He was signed by the Indianapolis Colts as an undrafted free agent in 2008. He played college football at Arizona State.

Burgess was also a member of the New York Jets and Chicago Bears.

He took off in college, he became just the 14th player in NCAA history to record over 1,000 rushing, receiving and returns yards.
