= Frank Omiyale =

American football player (born 1982)

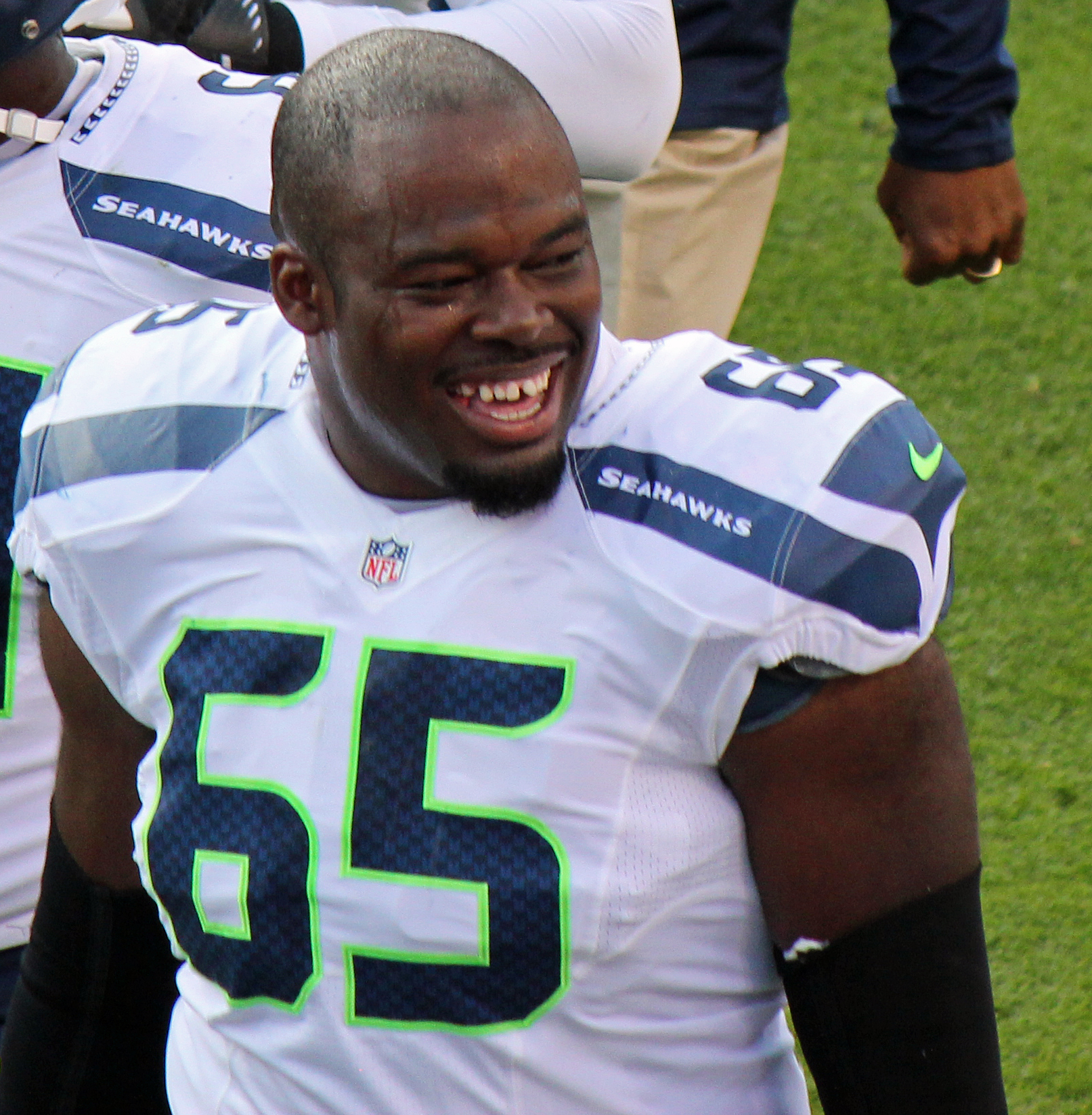
- Omiyale with the Seattle Seahawks in 2012

No. 70, 76, 68, 65
- Position: Offensive tackle

Personal information
- Born: November 23, 1982 (age 43); Nashville, Tennessee, U.S.
- Listed height: 6 ft 4 in (1.93 m)
- Listed weight: 315 lb (143 kg)

Career information
- High school: Whites Creek (Whites Creek, Tennessee)
- College: Tennessee Tech
- NFL draft: 2005: 5th round, 163rd overall pick

Career history
- Atlanta Falcons (2005–2006); Carolina Panthers (2007–2008); Chicago Bears (2009–2011); Seattle Seahawks (2012)

Awards and highlights
- First-team All-OVC (2004)

Career NFL statistics
- Games played: 75
- Games started: 33
- Stats at Pro Football Reference

Frank Tayo Omiyale (/ˈoʊmiːjɑːl/ OH-mee-yahl; born November 23, 1982) is an American former professional football player who was an offensive tackle in the National Football League (NFL). He was selected by the Atlanta Falcons in the fifth round of the 2005 NFL draft. He played college football for the Tennessee Tech Golden Eagles.

Omiyale also played for the Carolina Panthers, Chicago Bears, and Seattle Seahawks.

== Early life ==
Omiyale attended Whites Creek Comprehensive High School in Whites Creek, Tennessee. In football, he was twice voted as the team's Most Valuable Lineman, and won All-Region honors, and second-team All-State honors. He also lettered in basketball, and competed in shot put and discus on the track and field team.

== College career ==
Omiyale played at Tennessee Technological University for four years from 2001 to 2004. As a senior with the Golden Eagles in 2004, he made the All-America team, won All-Ohio Valley Conference honors, and graded 90.5 for blocking consistency to lead the NCAA Division I-AA in that statistical category.

Omiyale was inducted into the Tennessee Tech Sports Hall of Fame in November 2015.

== Professional career ==
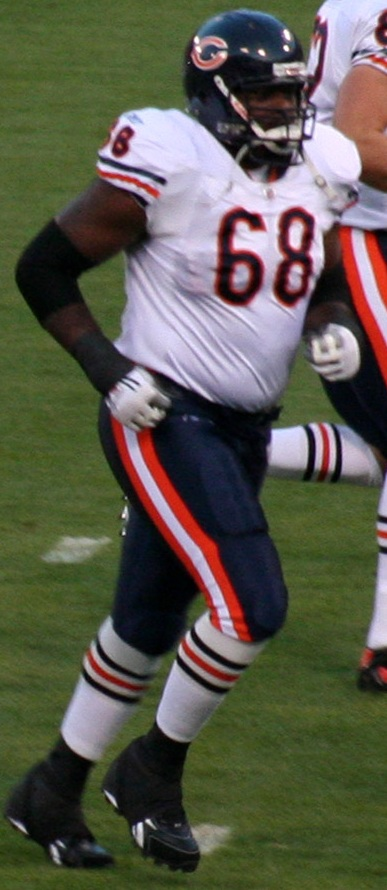
Omiyale while with the Bears.

=== Atlanta Falcons ===
Omiyale was selected in the fifth round (163rd overall) of the 2005 NFL draft by the Atlanta Falcons.

As a rookie in 2005, Omiyale was inactive for all 16 regular season games for the Falcons. In 2006, he made his first NFL appearance for the Falcons in a game against the Pittsburgh Steelers on October 22, 2006. He was placed on waivers by the Falcons on September 1, 2007.

=== Carolina Panthers ===
On September 2, 2007, Omiyale was claimed off waivers by the Carolina Panthers. However, he was inactive for all 16 regular season games for the Panthers in 2007.

On October 5, 2008, Omiyale made his first NFL regular season start, replacing the injured left tackle Jordan Gross who was out with a concussion.

=== Chicago Bears ===
Omiyale signed a four-year, $14 million deal with the Chicago Bears on February 27, 2009. He was released by the team on March 1, 2012.

=== Seattle Seahawks ===
On March 21, 2012, the Seattle Seahawks announced that Omiyale had agreed to terms with the team. After spending the 2012 season in Seattle, Omiyale retired from the NFL.
