= Jaron Marquis =

American rapper

- Also known as: J. Marquis
- Born: Jaron Marquis Garrett; July 8, 1983 (age 43); Indianapolis, Indiana, U.S.
- Genre: Hip hop
- Occupations: Rapper; actor; playwright; entrepreneur
- Instrument: Vocals
- Years active: 2007–present
- Label: Urban Genius Records
- Website: jaronmarquis.com

Jaron Marquis Garrett (born July 8, 1983), better known by his stage name Jaron Marquis or J. Marquis, is an American rapper, actor, entrepreneur and investor based in Los Angeles. He co-founded Dreamapolis, an Indianapolis-based start-up accelerator, and the independent record label Urban Genius Entertainment. As an actor he has starred in film roles that include Furious 7 and Straight Outta Compton.

== Early life ==
Marquis was born in Indianapolis and graduated from Arsenal Technical High School in 2001. He received a bachelor of arts degree with concentrations in business and pastoral sciences from Indiana State University in 2005. Then he moved to Chicago and obtained an MBA from Benedictine University.

From the age of 12, when he made and sold jewelry, Marquis tried various entrepreneurial ideas. He started a theatrical production company at Indiana University. After graduating, he operated an indoor advertising company, started and sold a painting firm, worked in college admissions, and owned part of a telecommunications company.

== Music career ==
Marquis began his rap career as an underground battle rapper in the late 1990s. He booked gigs for his rapper friends at Arsenal Tech High School, where he and his friends would organize and participate in local rap battles around the state of Indiana.

After a decade-long hiatus in which he developed entrepreneurial ventures and investments, Marquis reentered the music industry in 2014 under the name J. Marquis with the release of a mixtape entitled Soul of A Genius. The mixtape included the singles "We All Rant" and "Just Like Water" featuring Lauryn Hill.

In 2016, he began performing and recording under his actual name Jaron Marquis with the release of the single "Applause". Marquis described his music as "college dropout Kanye with a touch of Janelle Monáe."

== Business career ==
Marquis founded a company, JJ Marquis Investment Group LLC, and started doing real estate full-time in 2006. A year later, he made a $30 million project for a 25-story apartment tower to be built on run-down properties in downtown Indianapolis. However, the project never materialized and construction plans were canceled.

He was an OnyxFest finalist in 2012. He directed Betsy on E. 10th Street, a play by the Indianapolis Urban Theatre and Dance Company, a theatrical production company which he co-founded. He also played one of the main roles. The play was praised for drawing its story from the life of a Vietnam veteran and ex-Black Panther.

In 2011, Marquis also co-founded Dreamapolis, an Indianapolis-based start-up accelerator and seed-funding source for start-ups, social entrepreneurs, creatives and innovators. It helped urban entrepreneurs start businesses by connecting them with critical tools and resources. Dreamapolis held entrepreneur workshops and crowdfunding events, organized business summer camps for youth, and invested in creative Indianapolis ideas.

Marquis launched the independent record label Urban Genius Entertainment in 2013 and began recording new music in 2014.

== Private life ==
Marquis is married and has three daughters. He currently lives and works in Los Angeles.

== Discography ==
=== Singles ===
Year	Title	Label
2016	Applause	Urban Genius Entertainment
2016	Baby Yeah	Urban Genius Entertainment
2017	That's My N***a	Urban Genius Entertainment

=== Mixtapes ===
Year	Title
2014	Soul of a Genius

== Filmography ==
Year	Title	Role	Notes
2007	Girl Crazy	Bobby	
2010	Antihero	Stranger	short
2015	HitRecord on TV	himself	also: composer and musician
2015	Furious 7	L.A. Street Racer	uncredited
2015	Straight Outta Compton	T-shirt vendor	uncredited
