= Woodny Turenne =

American gridiron football player (born 1987)

Woodney Turenne
No. 29
- Position: Cornerback

Personal information
- Born: January 25, 1987 (age 39); Ft. Lauderdale, Florida, U.S.
- Listed height: 6 ft 0 in (1.83 m)
- Listed weight: 184 lb (83 kg)

Career information
- College: Louisville
- NFL draft: 2009: undrafted

Career history
- Chicago Bears (2009); New York Giants (2010–2011)*; Hamilton Tiger-Cats (2011); Saskatchewan Roughriders (2012–2014)
- * Offseason or practice squad member only

Awards and highlights
- Grey Cup champion (2013)
- Stats at Pro Football Reference
- Stats at CFL.ca (archive)

Woodny Turenne (born January 25, 1987) is an American former professional football cornerback. He was signed by the Chicago Bears as an undrafted free agent in 2009. He played college football at Louisville.

He was also a member of the New York Giants, Hamilton Tiger-Cats and Saskatchewan Roughriders.

== Professional career ==
=== Chicago Bears ===
He was initially released by the Bears, but was signed to their practice squad on October 13, 2009.

=== New York Giants ===
Turenne was signed to the New York Giants' practice squad on November 24, 2010.

In 2011, he injured his calf during training camp and was waived/injured and later released with an injury settlement on August 23.

=== Hamilton Tiger-Cats ===
He was signed as a free agent by the Hamilton Tiger-Cats on September 27, 2011.

=== Saskatchewan Roughriders ===
He played for the Saskatchewan Roughriders from 2012 to 2014.
