= Jarren Williams =

Jarren Williams may refer to:

- Jarren Williams (quarterback), American football player
- Jarren Williams (defensive back) (born 1997), American football player

== See also ==
- Jerre Stockton Williams (1916–1993), United States Circuit Judge
