= Jarron Gilbert =

American football player (born 1986)

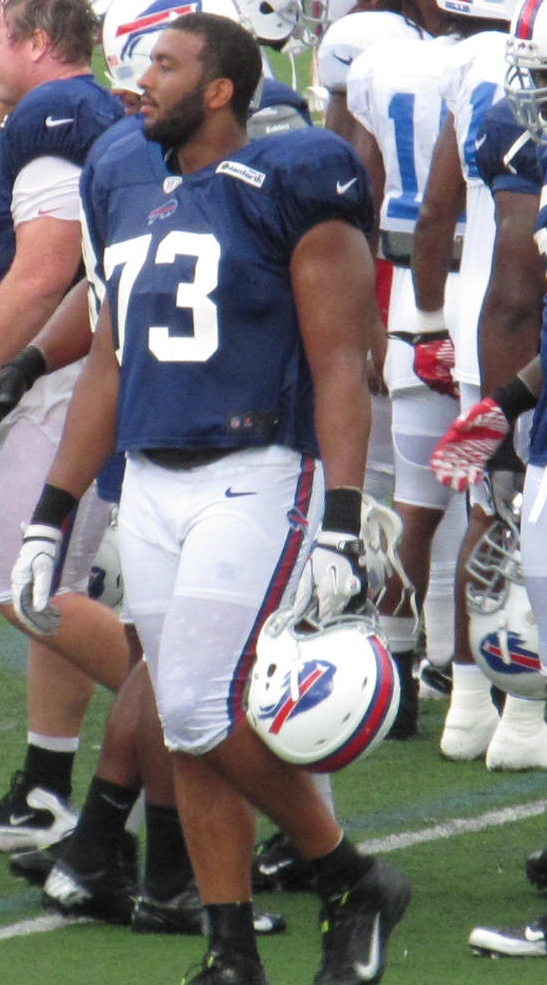
- Gilbert with the Buffalo Bills in 2012

No. 90, 71, 73
- Position: Defensive end

Personal information
- Born: September 30, 1986 (age 40); New Orleans, Louisiana, U.S.
- Listed height: 6 ft 5 in (1.96 m)
- Listed weight: 289 lb (131 kg)

Career information
- High school: Chino (Chino, California)
- College: San Jose State
- NFL draft: 2009: 3rd round, 68th overall pick

Career history
- Chicago Bears (2009); New York Jets (2010–2011); Buffalo Bills (2011–2012)

Awards and highlights
- WAC Defensive Player of the Year (2008); Second-team All-WAC (2007); New Mexico Bowl champion (2006)

Career NFL statistics
- Total tackles: 2
- Stats at Pro Football Reference

Jarron Kendrick Gilbert (born September 30, 1986) is an American former professional football player who was a defensive end in the National Football League (NFL). He was selected by the Chicago Bears in the third round of the 2009 NFL draft. He played college football at San Jose State. Gilbert was also a member of the New York Jets and Buffalo Bills.

== Early life ==
Lettered in football, basketball, and track and field at Chino High School in Chino, California. Gilbert was an All-Sierra League selection in football and basketball. His father Daren Gilbert played for the New Orleans Saints from 1985 to 1988.

== College career ==
In 2006, he played 13 games with 10 starts. He had 32 tackles including 7.5 for losses and 5 sacks with 6 pass deflected. In 2005, he played 10 games with 3 starts and was credited with 22 tackles and 3.0 quarterback sacks, with 5 of the tackles for a loss and he deflected 2 passes.

In 2007, Gilbert played and started 12 games and had 39 (23 solo 16 assisted) tackles, (7.5 for a loss) and 4 Sacks and 4 pass deflections and forced a fumble. He earned 2007 second-team All-Western Athletic Conference.

As a senior in 2008, Gilbert totaled 52 Tackles with 22.0 (which led the NCAA) for losses and 9.5 Sacks. He also had 3 passes defensed, and forced 2 fumbles. He was an All-Western Athletic Conference First-team choice and named the league's co-Defensive Player of the Year. He was also the team captain and was named the team's Most Valuable Player. Gilbert graduated from San Jose State with a B.A. in sociology in December 2008.

=== Career statistics ===
Year	Team	GP	GS	UA	AT	TT	T/L	Sacks	FF	FR	PD	INT
2005	San Jose State	11	4	14	8	22	5	3	0	0	2	0
2006	San Jose State	13	10	14	18	32	7.5	5	0	0	6	0
2007	San Jose State	10	10	23	15	38	7.5	4	1	0	4	0
2008	San Jose State	14	14	36	16	52	22	9.5	2	0	3	0
Totals		48	38	87	57	144	42	22.5	3	0	15	0

Key: GP - games played; GS - games started; UA - unassisted tackles; AT - assisted tackles; TT - total tackles; T/L - tackles for a loss; Sacks -; FF – Forced fumble; FR – Fumbles recovered; PD - passes deflected; Int - interceptions

== Professional career ==
=== Pre-draft ===
Prior to the 2009 NFL draft, Gilbert gained Internet notoriety for a YouTube video featuring him jumping out of a swimming pool.

Pre-draft measurables
Height	Weight	40-yard dash	10-yard split	20-yard split	20-yard shuttle	Three-cone drill	Vertical jump	Broad jump	Bench press	Wonderlic
6 ft 5 1/4 in (1.96 m)	288 lb (131 kg)	4.76 s	1.67 s	2.70 s	4.40 s	7.59 s	37 in (0.94 m)	10 ft 7 in (3.23 m)	28 reps	29
All values from NFL Combine, except sprints, broad jump, and vertical, which are from San Jose State Pro Day

=== Chicago Bears ===
Gilbert played in four games for the Bears during the 2009 season, posting one solo tackle.

=== New York Jets ===
On September 7, 2010, the New York Jets claimed Gilbert off of waivers. Gilbert was assigned to the team's practice squad. On October 27, 2010, Gilbert was promoted to the active roster. Gilbert was waived by the team on November 18, 2010. Gilbert re-signed to the team's practice squad the following day. Gilbert was waived on September 3, 2011. He was re-signed to the practice squad on September 4, 2011. Gilbert was released from the practice squad on November 9, 2011.

Gilbert was re-signed to the team's practice squad on November 19, 2011.

=== Buffalo Bills ===
Gilbert was signed to the Buffalo Bills' active roster on December 17, 2011. The Bills waived Gilbert on August 31, 2012. On December 31, 2012, the Bills signed Gilbert to a future contract. Gilbert was waived on August 30, 2013.

== Personal life ==
Gilbert is cousins with three-time NBA champion, JaVale McGee and current WNBA player, Imani McGee-Stafford.
