= Johan Asiata =

American gridiron football player (born 1985)

No. 57
- Position: Offensive lineman

Personal information
- Born: December 19, 1985 (age 40); Christchurch, New Zealand
- Listed height: 6 ft 4 in (1.93 m)
- Listed weight: 300 lb (136 kg)

Career information
- High school: National Guard Youth Challenge Academy (Kapolei, Hawaii)
- College: UNLV
- NFL draft: 2009: undrafted

Career history
- Chicago Bears (2009–2011); Saskatchewan Roughriders (2012); BC Lions (2013); Los Angeles Kiss (2014)*
- * Offseason or practice squad member only

Career NFL statistics
- Games played: 2
- Games started: 0
- Stats at Pro Football Reference
- Stats at CFL.ca (archive)

Johan Asiata (born December 19, 1985) is a former professional gridiron football offensive lineman. He was signed as an undrafted free agent by the Chicago Bears in 2009. He played college football at UNLV.

== Early life and college ==
Born in Christchurch, New Zealand, Asiata later lived in Kalihi, Hawaii and attended the National Guard Youth Challenge Academy, a military school in Kapolei. Asiata then moved to California to attend Yuba College. After playing junior college football at Yuba in 2004 and 2005, Asiata transferred to the University of Nevada, Las Vegas, where he played at offensive line for UNLV Rebels football from 2007 to 2008. During his senior year at UNLV, he earned honorable Mention All-Mountain West Conference honors and started all 12 games for UNLV and did not allow a sack.

== Professional career ==
=== Chicago Bears ===
Asiata signed with the Chicago Bears on April 27, 2009. and spent most of 2009 on the practice squad but was in consideration to start at left guard in 2010.

On September 2, 2011, he was waived by Chicago.

=== Saskatchewan Roughriders ===
On April 24, 2012, Asiata was signed by the Saskatchewan Roughriders.

=== BC Lions ===
Along with Levi Horn and Andre Ramsey, Asiata was signed by the BC Lions on March 26, 2013.

=== Los Angeles Kiss ===
On October 4, 2013, Asiata was assigned to the Los Angeles Kiss of the Arena Football League.
