= 2005 Chicago Bears season =

NFL team season

- Owner: The McCaskey Family
- General manager: Jerry Angelo
- Head coach: Lovie Smith
- Home stadium: Soldier Field

Results
- Record: 11–5
- Division place: 1st NFC North
- Playoffs: Lost Divisional Playoffs (vs. Panthers) 21–29
- All-Pros: 6: Lance Briggs (1st team); Brian Urlacher (1st team); Olin Kreutz (2nd team); Tommie Harris (2nd team); Mike Brown (2nd team); Nathan Vasher (2nd team)
- Pro Bowlers: C Olin Kreutz; DT Tommie Harris; MLB Brian Urlacher; OLB Lance Briggs; CB Nathan Vasher; SS Mike Brown

The 2005 season was the Chicago Bears' 86th season in the National Football League (NFL), and the second under head coach Lovie Smith. The team improved to an 11–5 record from a 5–11 record in 2004, earning them their first playoff berth and division title since 2001 (as well as their first NFC North title after division realignment in 2002) and the second seed in the NFC for the playoffs.

The season started off with the team trying to rebound from a 5–11 season under head coach Lovie Smith. Smith, in his first year with the Bears, had been eager to lead his young team to a Super Bowl, but a preseason injury to starting quarterback Rex Grossman spelled disaster for the Bears. The 2005 Bears started the season slowly, winning only one of their first four games. Despite their poor passing game, the Bears won eight consecutive games, through perseverance on defense and a solid running game. The Bears eventually clinched a playoff berth on Christmas Day against the Green Bay Packers. However, in their first playoff game in four years the Carolina Panthers upset the Bears, 29–21.

This season is notable for Bears linebacker Brian Urlacher winning Defensive Player of the Year. He was the first Bear to earn the award since 1988 when Mike Singletary won.

== Offseason ==
Additions	Subtractions
WR Muhsin Muhammad (Panthers)	G Rex Tucker (Rams)
WR Eddie Berlin (Titans)	WR David Terrell (Patriots)
OT Fred Miller (Titans)	K Paul Edinger (Vikings)
OT John St. Clair (Dolphins)	QB Jonathan Quinn (Chiefs)

=== NFL draft ===
2005 Chicago Bears draft
Round	Pick	Player	Position	College	Notes
1	4	Cedric Benson	Running back	Texas	
2	39	Mark Bradley	Wide receiver	Oklahoma	
4	106	Kyle Orton	Quarterback	Purdue	
5	140	Airese Currie	Wide receiver	Clemson	
6	181	Chris Harris	Safety	Louisiana-Monroe	
7	220	Rod Wilson	Linebacker	South Carolina	
Made roster † Pro Football Hall of Fame * Made at least one Pro Bowl during career

=== Undrafted free agents ===
2005 undrafted free agents of note
Player	Position	College
Jonathan Jackson	Defensive end	Oklahoma
Tyler Jones	Kicker	Boise State
Stephen Larsen	Linebacker	San Diego State
Matt McGhghy	Guard	Northern Illinois
Brandon McGowan	Safety	Maine
Greg Pauly	Defensive tackle	Notre Dame

=== Training camp ===
Hopeful expectations were crushed as quarterback Rex Grossman's ankle was broken in the 2nd preseason game against the St. Louis Rams. Backup quarterback Chad Hutchinson was benched and cut after struggling heavily in the next two preseason games against the Indianapolis Colts and Buffalo Bills. The Bears then turned to rookie Kyle Orton to lead their offense.

Rookie running back Cedric Benson held out of training camp over a contract dispute until just before the final preseason game. His absence in camp meant that Thomas Jones would be the starting running back going into the regular season.

Despite all these setbacks, the Bears were still hopeful because franchise middle linebacker Brian Urlacher had made it through the preseason in good health, unlike the year before when he battled injuries all season, beginning with a pulled hamstring on the first day of training camp.

=== Preseason ===
Week	Date	Opponent	Score
HOF	August 8	vs Miami Dolphins	W 27–24
1	August 12	at St. Louis Rams	L 13–17
2	August 20	at Indianapolis Colts	W 24–17
3	August 26	Buffalo Bills	W 16–12
4	September 1	Cleveland Browns	L 6–16

== Staff ==
2005 Chicago Bears staff
Front office: Chairman of the board – Michael McCaskey; President/chief executive officer – Ted Phillips; General manager – Jerry Angelo; Director of pro personnel – Bobby DePaul; Director of college scouting – Greg Gabriel; Head coaches: Head coach – Lovie Smith; Offensive coaches: Offensive coordinator – Ron Turner; Quarterbacks – Wade Wilson; Running backs – Tim Spencer; Wide receivers – Darryl Drake; Tight ends – Rob Boras; Offensive line – Harry Hiestand; Assistant offensive line – Harold Goodwin; Offensive quality control – Mike Bajakian	Defensive coaches: Defensive coordinator – Ron Rivera; Defensive line – Don Johnson; Linebackers – Bob Babich; Defensive backs – Perry Fewell; Assistant defensive backs – Torrian Gray; Defensive quality control – Lloyd Lee; Special teams coaches: Special teams coordinator – Dave Toub; Assistant special teams – Charlie Coiner; Strength and conditioning: Strength and conditioning coordinator – Rusty Jones; Strength and conditioning assistant – Jim Arthur

== Roster ==
2005 Chicago Bears roster
Quarterbacks (QB): 11 Jeff Blake; 8 Rex Grossman; 18 Kyle Orton; Running backs (RB): 32 Cedric Benson; 47 Bryan Johnson FB; 20 Thomas Jones; 37 Jason McKie FB; 29 Adrian Peterson; Wide receivers (WR): 86 Eddie Berlin; 80 Bernard Berrian; 12 Justin Gage; 87 Muhsin Muhammad; Tight ends (TE): 88 Desmond Clark; 85 John Gilmore; 82 Gabe Reid	Offensive linemen (OL): 68 Ruben Brown G; 79 Steve Edwards G; 62 Lennie Friedman C; 63 Roberto Garza G; 57 Olin Kreutz C; 60 Terrence Metcalf G; 69 Fred Miller OT; 72 Qasim Mitchell OT; 78 John St. Clair OT; 76 John Tait OT; Defensive linemen (DL): 70 Alfonso Boone DT; 96 Alex Brown DE; 91 Tommie Harris DT; 97 Michael Haynes DE; 71 Israel Idonije DE; 99 Tank Johnson DT; 93 Adewale Ogunleye DE; 95 Ian Scott DT	Linebackers (LB): 94 Brendon Ayanbadejo OLB; 55 Lance Briggs OLB; 58 Jeremy Cain MLB; 92 Hunter Hillenmeyer OLB; 53 Leon Joe OLB; 54 Brian Urlacher MLB; Defensive backs (DB): 23 Jerry Azumah CB; 30 Mike Brown SS; 21 Rashied Davis CB; 43 Mike Green FS; 46 Chris Harris FS; 26 Daven Holly CB; 35 Todd Johnson SS; 36 Brandon McGowan SS; 27 Chris Thompson CB; 33 Charles Tillman CB; 31 Nathan Vasher CB; Special teams (ST): 9 Robbie Gould K; 65 Patrick Mannelly LS; 4 Brad Maynard P	Practice squad: 39 Willie Amos S; 44 Keith Belton FB; 14 Craig Bragg WR; 98 Darrell Campbell DT; 90 Antonio Garay DT; 67 Jamaal Green DE; 49 T. J. Hollowell OLB; 68 Anthony Oakley G; Reserve: 16 Mark Bradley WR (IR); 17 Airese Currie WR (IR); 25 Bobby Gray SS (IR); 22 Alfonso Marshall CB (PUP); 59 Joe Odom OLB (IR); 52 Marcus Reese OLB (IR); 64 Rod Wilson MLB (IR); 24 Cameron Worrell FS (IR); Rookies in italics 53 active, 8 reserve, 8 practice squad

== Regular season ==
=== Schedule ===
Week	Date	Opponent	Result	Record	Venue
1	September 11	at Washington Redskins	L 7–9	0–1	FedExField
2	September 18	Detroit Lions	W 38–6	1–1	Soldier Field
3	September 25	Cincinnati Bengals	L 7–24	1–2	Soldier Field
4	Bye				
5	October 9	at Cleveland Browns	L 10–20	1–3	Cleveland Browns Stadium
6	October 16	Minnesota Vikings	W 28–3	2–3	Soldier Field
7	October 23	Baltimore Ravens	W 10–6	3–3	Soldier Field
8	October 30	at Detroit Lions	W 19–13 (OT)	4–3	Ford Field
9	November 6	at New Orleans Saints	W 20–17	5–3	Tiger Stadium
10	November 13	San Francisco 49ers	W 17–9	6–3	Soldier Field
11	November 20	Carolina Panthers	W 13–3	7–3	Soldier Field
12	November 27	at Tampa Bay Buccaneers	W 13–10	8–3	Raymond James Stadium
13	December 4	Green Bay Packers	W 19–7	9–3	Soldier Field
14	December 11	at Pittsburgh Steelers	L 9–21	9–4	Heinz Field
15	December 18	Atlanta Falcons	W 16–3	10–4	Soldier Field
16	December 25	at Green Bay Packers	W 24–17	11–4	Lambeau Field
17	January 1	at Minnesota Vikings	L 10–34	11–5	Hubert H. Humphrey Metrodome

== Standings ==
NFC North
	W	L	T	PCT	DIV	CONF	PF	PA	STK
^{(2)} Chicago Bears	11	5	0	.688	5–1	10–2	260	202	L1
Minnesota Vikings	9	7	0	.563	5–1	8–4	306	344	W1
Detroit Lions	5	11	0	.313	1–5	3–9	254	345	L1
Green Bay Packers	4	12	0	.250	1–5	4–8	298	344	W1

== Game summaries ==
=== Week 1: at Washington Redskins ===
Quarter	1	2	3	4	Total
Bears	0	0	7	0	7
Redskins	0	3	6	0	9

at FedExField

- Game time: 1:00 p.m. EST/12:00 p.m. CST
- Game weather: 80 °F (27 °C)
- Game attendance: 90,138
- TV announcers (Fox): Dick Stockton and Daryl Johnston

Game information
Q2 – WAS – 7:34 – John Hall 40-yard field goal (WAS 3–0)

Q2 – WAS – 1:00 – John Hall 43-yard field goal (WAS 6–0)

Q3 – CHI – 11:28 – Thomas Jones 1-yard run (Doug Brien kick) (CHI 7–6)

Q3 – WAS – 2:54 – John Hall 19-yard field goal (WAS 9–7)

=== Week 2: vs. Detroit Lions ===
Quarter	1	2	3	4	Total
Lions	6	0	0	0	6
Bears	10	21	0	7	38

at Soldier Field

- Game time: 1:00 p.m. EST/12:00 p.m. CST
- Game weather: Sunny, 81 °F (27 °C)
- Game attendance: 62,019
- TV announcers (Fox): Joe Buck and Troy Aikman

Game information
Q1 – CHI – 10:10 – Thomas Jones 3-yard run (Doug Brien kick) (CHI 7–0)

Q1 – DET – 9:54 – Roy Williams 51-yard pass from Joey Harrington (kick failed) (CHI 7–6)

Q1 – CHI – 6:04 – Doug Brien 48-yard field goal (CHI 10–6)

Q2 – CHI – 11:34 – Bobby Wade 73-yard punt return (Doug Brien kick) (CHI 17–6)

Q2 – CHI – 1:14 – Muhsin Muhammad 28-yard pass from Kyle Orton (Doug Brien kick) (CHI 24–6)

Q2 – CHI – 0:57 – Mike Brown 41-yard interception return (Doug Brien kick) (CHI 31–6)

Q4 – CHI – 12:13 – Thomas Jones 16-yard run (Doug Brien kick) (CHI 38–6)

=== Week 3: vs. Cincinnati Bengals ===
Quarter	1	2	3	4	Total
Bengals	10	0	7	7	24
Bears	0	0	7	0	7

at Soldier Field

- Game time: 1:00 p.m. EST/12:00 p.m. CST
- Game weather: Light rain, 72 °F (22 °C)
- Game attendance: 62,045
- TV announcers (CBS): Kevin Harlan and Randy Cross

Game information
Q1 – CIN – 13:46 – Chad Johnson 18-yard pass from Carson Palmer (Shayne Graham kick) (CIN 7–0)

Q1 – CIN – 5:31 – Shayne Graham 33-yard field goal (CIN 10–0)

Q3 – CIN – 7:03 – Chris Henry 36-yard pass from Carson Palmer (Shayne Graham kick) (CIN 17–0)

Q4 – CHI – 13:30 – Thomas Jones 2-yard run (Doug Brien kick) (CIN 17–7)

Q4 – CIN – 11:56 – Chad Johnson 40-yard pass from Carson Palmer (Shayne Graham kick) (CIN 24–7)

This was Chicago's only loss at home during the season.

=== Week 5: at Cleveland Browns ===
Quarter	1	2	3	4	Total
Bears	0	3	7	0	10
Browns	3	3	0	14	20

at Cleveland Browns Stadium

- Game time: 1:00 p.m. EST/12:00 p.m. CST
- Game weather: 73 °F (23 °C)
- Game attendance: 73,079
- TV announcers (Fox): Ron Pitts and Tim Ryan

Game information
Q1 – CLE – 4:17 – Phil Dawson 19-yard field goal (CLE 3–0)

Q2 – CHI – 9:01 – Robbie Gould 44-yard field goal (3–3)

Q2 – CLE – 0:37 – Phil Dawson 44-yard field goal (CLE 6–3)

Q3 – CHI – 5:29 – Marc Edwards 8-yard pass from Kyle Orton (Robbie Gould kick) (CHI 10–6)

Q4 – CLE – 3:02 – Antonio Bryant 33-yard pass from Trent Dilfer (Phil Dawson kick) (CLE 13–10)

Q4 – CLE – 2:24 – Antonio Bryant 28-yard pass from Trent Dilfer (Phil Dawson kick) (CLE 20–10)

=== Week 6: vs. Minnesota Vikings ===
Quarter	1	2	3	4	Total
Vikings	0	3	0	0	3
Bears	0	7	7	14	28

at Soldier Field

- Game time: 1:00 p.m. EST/12:00 p.m. CST
- Game weather: Sunny, 60 °F (16 °C)
- Game attendance: 62,143
- TV announcers (Fox): Sam Rosen and Bill Maas

Game information
Q2 – MIN – 6:55 – Paul Edinger 23-yard field goal (MIN 3–0)

Q2 – CHI – 0:37 – Desmond Clark 3-yard pass from Kyle Orton (Robbie Gould kick) (CHI 7–3)

Q3 – CHI – 7:28 – Desmond Clark 2-yard pass from Kyle Orton (Robbie Gould kick) (CHI 14–3)

Q4 – CHI – 13:03 – Thomas Jones 24-yard run (Robbie Gould kick) (CHI 21–3)

Q4 – CHI – 4:11 – Thomas Jones 1-yard run (Robbie Gould kick) (CHI 28–3)

=== Week 7: vs. Baltimore Ravens ===
Quarter	1	2	3	4	Total
Ravens	0	6	0	0	6
Bears	7	0	3	0	10

at Soldier Field

- Game time: 4:15 p.m. EST/3:15 p.m. CST
- Game weather: Thunderstorms, 46 °F (8 °C)
- Game attendance: 62,102
- TV announcers (CBS): Ian Eagle and Solomon Wilcots

Game information
Q1 – CHI – 0:19 – Marc Edwards 9-yard pass from Kyle Orton (Robbie Gould kick) (CHI 7–0)

Q2 – BAL – 8:46 – Matt Stover 40-yard field goal (CHI 7–3)

Q2 – BAL – 0:26 – Matt Stover 29-yard field goal (CHI 7–6)

Q3 – CHI – 2:52 – Robbie Gould 23-yard field goal (CHI 10–6)

The 1985 Bears, who won Super Bowl XX, were honored at halftime. Much of the team was present for the reunion, which then-coach Mike Ditka spoke in a recorded segment. Dan Hampton gave a speech in which he recognized teammate Walter Payton, who died in 1999, leading to a standing ovation.

=== Week 8: at Detroit Lions ===
Quarter	1	2	3	4	OT	Total
Bears	0	13	0	0	6	19
Lions	3	0	7	3	0	13

at Ford Field

- Game time: 1:00 p.m. EST/12:00 p.m. CST
- Game attendance: 61,814
- TV announcers (Fox): Ron Pitts and Tim Ryan

Game information
Q1 – DET – 4:11 – Jason Hanson 32-yard field goal (DET 3–0)

Q2 – CHI – 9:29 – Muhsin Muhammad 23-yard pass from Kyle Orton (Robbie Gould kick) (CHI 7–3)

Q2 – CHI – 1:51 – Robbie Gould 38-yard field goal (CHI 10–3)

Q2 – CHI – 0:17 – Robbie Gould 20-yard field goal (CHI 13–3)

Q3 – DET – 3:15 – Kevin Jones 6-yard run (Jason Hanson kick) (CHI 13–10)

Q4 – DET – 13:20 – Jason Hanson 30-yard field goal (13–13)

OT – CHI – 8:43 – Charles Tillman 22-yard interception return (CHI 19–13)

Bears rookie Mark Bradley was placed on injured reserve this game, and was replaced by Justin Gage. Bradley had recorded 18 receptions for 230 yards at the time of his injury.

=== Week 9: at New Orleans Saints ===
Quarter	1	2	3	4	Total
Bears	7	3	7	3	20
Saints	3	7	0	7	17

at Tiger Stadium

- Game time: 3:05 p.m. CST
- Game attendance: 32,637
- TV announcers (Fox): Kenny Albert and Brian Baldinger

Game information
Q1 – NO – 12:18 – John Carney 22-yard field goal (NO 3-0)

Q1 – CHI – 6:26 – Justin Gage 4-yard pass from Kyle Orton (Robbie Gould kick) (7–3)

Q2 – NO – 9:57 – Donté Stallworth 15-yard pass from Aaron Brooks (John Carney kick) (NO 10-7)

Q2 – CHI – 0:22 – Robbie Gould 35-yard field goal (10–10)

Q3 – CHI – 7:29 – Adrian Peterson 6-yard run (Robbie Gould kick) (CHI 17–10)

Q4 – NO – 7:44 – Aaron Brooks 1-yard run (John Carney kick) (17–17)

Q4 – CHI – 0:06 – Robbie Gould 28-yard field goal (CHI 20–17)

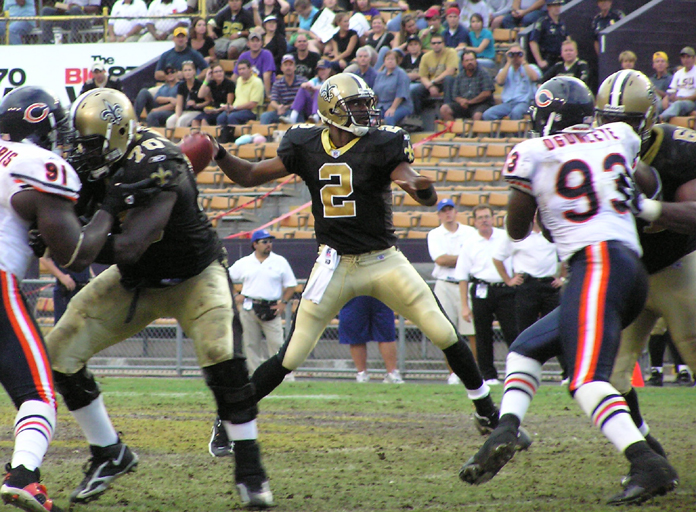
Saints quarterback Aaron Brooks passes against the Bears at Tiger Stadium

Due to damage from Hurricane Katrina to the Louisiana Superdome, the Saints were forced to host the game at LSU's Tiger Stadium in Baton Rouge. The Saints scored first on a John Carney field goal, but the Bears struck back with a Kyle Orton to Justin Gage touchdown pass. After the Saints scored on an Aaron Brooks touchdown pass to Donté Stallworth, Robbie Gould tied the game on a 35-yard field goal. In the second half, Adrian Peterson gave the Bears the lead on a 6-yard run, which was countered with Brooks scoring on a 1-yard touchdown run in the fourth. Orton eventually threw a 22-yard pass to Muhsin Muhammad to set up a game-winning field goal from Gould with six seconds left in the game. Gould eventually scored on a 28-yard field goal to give the Bears a 20–17 lead. The Saints' last chance to march 65 yards to win was crushed when Brooks' pass to Az-Zahir Hakim was intercepted by Nathan Vasher. The win was the Bears' fourth-straight, which hasn't been accomplished by the team since their 2001 season. In the first quarter, Bears running back Thomas Jones went out with an injury, but his backups Adrian Peterson and Cedric Benson combined for 137 yards and a touchdown.

=== Week 10: vs. San Francisco 49ers ===
Quarter	1	2	3	4	Total
49ers	0	3	3	3	9
Bears	0	7	0	10	17

at Soldier Field

- Game time: 1:00 p.m. EST/12:00 p.m. CST
- Game weather: Overcast, 50 °F (10 °C)
- Game attendance: 62,153
- TV announcers (Fox): Sam Rosen and Bill Maas

Game information
Q2 – SF – 8:57 – Joe Nedney 30-yard field goal (SF 3–0)

Q2 – CHI – 0:00 – Nathan Vasher 108-yard missed field goal return (Robbie Gould kick) (CHI 7–3)

Q3 – SF – 9:38 – Joe Nedney 34-yard field goal (CHI 7–6)

Q4 – CHI – 14:33 – Adrian Peterson 7-yard run (Robbie Gould kick) (CHI 14–6)

Q4 – SF – 10:54 – Joe Nedney 29-yard field goal (CHI 14–9)

Q4 – CHI – 7:40 – Robbie Gould 37-yard field goal (CHI 17–9)

With wind speeds reaching 26 MPH, this is the windiest game in NFL history

=== Week 11: vs. Carolina Panthers ===
Quarter	1	2	3	4	Total
Panthers	0	0	0	3	3
Bears	10	3	0	0	13

at Soldier Field

- Game time: 1:00 p.m. EST/12:00 p.m. CST
- Game weather: Cloudy, 44 °F (7 °C)
- Game attendance: 62,156
- TV announcers (Fox): Sam Rosen and Bill Maas

Game information
Q1 – CHI – 11:50 – Muhsin Muhammad 3-yard pass from Kyle Orton (Robbie Gould kick) (CHI 7–0)

Q1 – CHI – 5:41 – Robbie Gould 33-yard field goal (CHI 10–0)

Q2 – CHI – 7:52 – Robbie Gould 39-yard field goal (CHI 13–0)

Q4 – CAR – 8:31 – John Kasay 38-yard field goal (CHI 13–3)

=== Week 12: at Tampa Bay Buccaneers ===
Quarter	1	2	3	4	Total
Bears	7	3	3	0	13
Buccaneers	3	0	0	7	10

at Raymond James Stadium

- Game time: 1:00 p.m. EST/12:00 p.m. CST
- Game weather: 76 °F (24 °C)
- Game attendance: 65,506
- TV announcers (Fox): Kenny Albert and Brian Baldinger

Game information
Q1 – CHI – 11:50 – John Gilmore 1-yard pass from Kyle Orton (Robbie Gould kick) (CHI 7–0)

Q1 – TB – 2:12 – Matt Bryant 27-yard field goal (CHI 7–3)

Q2 – CHI – 0:17 – Robbie Gould 25-yard field goal (CHI 10–3)

Q3 – CHI – 3:47 – Robbie Gould 36-yard field goal (CHI 13–3)

Q4 – TB – 7:00 – Mike Alstott 2-yard run (CHI 13–10)

=== Week 13: vs. Green Bay Packers ===
Quarter	1	2	3	4	Total
Packers	0	7	0	0	7
Bears	0	9	0	10	19

at Soldier Field

- Game time: 1:00 p.m. EST/12:00 p.m. CST
- Game weather: Sunny, 24 °F (−4 °C)
- Game attendance: 62,177
- TV announcers (Fox): Dick Stockton and Daryl Johnston

Game information
Q2 – CHI – 13:34 – Robbie Gould 21-yard field goal (CHI 3–0)

Q2 – GB – 7:03 – Samkon Gado 2-yard run (Ryan Longwell kick) (GB 7–3)

Q2 – CHI – 4:33 – Robbie Gould 40-yard field goal (GB 7–6)

Q2 – CHI – 0:02 – Robbie Gould 25-yard field goal (CHI 9–7)

Q4 – CHI – 8:22 – Robbie Gould 35-yard field goal (CHI 12–7)

Q4 – CHI – 3:06 – Nathan Vasher 45-yard interception return (Robbie Gould kick) (CHI 19–7)

=== Week 14: at Pittsburgh Steelers ===
Quarter	1	2	3	4	Total
Bears	3	0	0	6	9
Steelers	7	7	7	0	21

at Heinz Field

- Game time: 1:00 p.m. EST/12:00 p.m. CST
- Game weather: Snow flurries, 30 °F (−1 °C)
- Game attendance: 61,237
- TV announcers (Fox): Dick Stockton and Daryl Johnston

Game information
Q1 – PIT – 9:16 – Hines Ward 14-yard pass from Ben Roethlisberger (Jeff Reed kick) (PIT 7–0)

Q1 – CHI – 2:30 – Robbie Gould 29-yard field goal (PIT 7–3)

Q2 – PIT – 7:25 – Jerome Bettis 1-yard run (Jeff Reed kick) (PIT 14–3)

Q3 – PIT – 5:23 – Jerome Bettis 5-yard run (Jeff Reed kick) (PIT 21–3)

Q4 – CHI – 13:38 – Thomas Jones 1-yard run (kick failed) (PIT 21–9)

=== Week 15: vs. Atlanta Falcons ===
Quarter	1	2	3	4	Total
Falcons	0	3	0	0	3
Bears	0	6	10	0	16

at Soldier Field

- Game time: 8:30 p.m. EST/7:30 p.m. CST
- Game weather: Clear, 8 °F (−13 °C)
- Game attendance: 62,170
- TV announcers (ESPN): Mike Patrick, Joe Theismann and Paul Maguire

Game information
Q2 – ATL – 10:16 – Todd Peterson 30-yard field goal (ATL 3–0)

Q2 – CHI – 6:33 – Robbie Gould 35-yard field goal (3–3)

Q2 – CHI – 3:20 – Robbie Gould 29-yard field goal (CHI 6–3)

Q3 – CHI – 8:17 – Thomas Jones 1-yard run (Robbie Gould kick) (CHI 13–3)

Q3 – CHI – 0:53 – Robbie Gould 39-yard field goal (CHI 16–3)

=== Week 16: at Green Bay Packers ===
Quarter	1	2	3	4	Total
Bears	7	7	10	0	24
Packers	0	7	0	10	17

at Lambeau Field

- Game time: 5:00 p.m. EST/4:00 p.m. CST
- Game weather: Clear, 34 °F (1 °C)
- Game attendance: 69,757
- TV announcers (Fox): Sam Rosen and Bill Maas

Game information
Q1 – CHI – 5:00 – Muhsin Muhammad 12-yard pass from Rex Grossman (Robbie Gould kick) (CHI 7–0)

Q2 – GB – 12:05 – Noah Herron 1-yard run (Ryan Longwell kick) (7–7)

Q2 – CHI – 5:05 – Thomas Jones 2-yard run (Robbie Gould kick) (CHI 14–7)

Q3 – CHI – 9:39 – Robbie Gould 45-yard field goal (CHI 17–7)

Q3 – CHI – 4:01 – Lance Briggs 10-yard interception return (Robbie Gould kick) (CHI 24–7)

Q4 – GB – 7:54 – Antonio Chatman 85-yard punt return (Ryan Longwell kick) (CHI 24–14)

Q4 – GB – 1:54 – Ryan Longwell 26-yard field goal (CHI 24–17)

The win marked the first time since 1991 that the Bears swept the Green Bay Packers.

=== Week 17: at Minnesota Vikings ===
Quarter	1	2	3	4	Total
Bears	3	0	0	7	10
Vikings	0	17	7	10	34

at Hubert H. Humphrey Metrodome

- Game time: 4:15 p.m. EST/3:15 p.m. CST
- Game weather: None (indoor stadium)
- Game attendance: 64,023
- TV announcers (Fox): Dick Stockton and Daryl Johnston

Game information
Q1 – CHI – 5:14 – Robbie Gould 22-yard field goal (CHI 3–0)

Q2 – MIN – 14:53 – Paul Edinger 54-yard field goal (3–3)

Q2 – MIN – 7:37 – Ciatrick Fason 2-yard run (Paul Edinger kick) (MIN 10–3)

Q2 – MIN – 0:03 – Travis Taylor 17-yard pass from Brad Johnson (Paul Edinger kick) (MIN 17–3)

Q3 – MIN – 3:58 – Mewelde Moore 7-yard pass from Brad Johnson (Paul Edinger kick) (MIN 24–3)

Q4 – MIN – 14:52 – Paul Edinger 27-yard field goal (MIN 27–3)

Q4 – CHI – 7:08 – Justin Gage 4-yard pass from Jeff Blake (Robbie Gould kick) (MIN 27–10)

Q4 – MIN – 5:10 – Michael Bennett 61-yard run (Paul Edinger kick) (MIN 34–10)

== Playoffs ==
=== NFC Divisional Playoff: vs. Carolina Panthers ===
Quarter	1	2	3	4	Total
Panthers	7	9	7	6	29
Bears	0	7	7	7	21

at Soldier Field

- Game time: 4:30 p.m. EST/3:30 p.m. CST
- Game weather: 42 °F (6 °C)
- Game attendance: 62,209
- TV announcers (FOX): Joe Buck and Troy Aikman

Game information
Q1 – CAR – 14:05 – 58 yd TD pass from Jake Delhomme to Steve Smith (Kasay kick) (7–0 CAR)

Q2 – CAR – 14:57 – John Kasay 20 yd FG (CAR 10–0)

Q2 – CAR – 6:26 – John Kasay 38 yd FG (CAR 13–0)

Q2 – CHI – 2:58 – Adrian Peterson 1 yd TD run (Robbie Gould kick) (CAR 13–7)

Q2 – CAR – 0:00 – John Kasay 37 yd FG (CAR 16–7)

Q3 – CHI – 11:21 – 1 yd TD pass from Rex Grossman to Desmond Clark (Gould kick) (CAR 16–14)

Q3 – CAR – 2:07 – 39 yd TD pass from Jake Delhomme to Steve Smith (Kasay kick) (CAR 23–14)

Q4 – CHI – 13:23 – Jason McKie 1 yd TD run (Gould kick) (CAR 23–21)

Q4 – CAR – 8:04 – 1 yd TD pass from Jake Delhomme to Kris Mangum (kick failed) (CAR 29–21)

The Bears hosted their first playoff game since the 2001 season against the red hot Panthers, fresh off a victory over Eli Manning and the New York Giants.

Things were bad from the beginning for the Bears, who allowed a 58-yard Jake Delhomme TD pass to Steve Smith just 55 seconds into the game. Cornerback Charles Tillman slipped on the play, and it only signified things to come the rest of the game for the vaunted Bears defense.

The Panthers added two field goals to their total before the Bears got their first points.

The Bears offense got off to a slow start, having their first 5 possessions end in punts. Their first score came midway through the second quarter, when running back Adrian Peterson scored a touchdown on a 1-yard run. The Bears had opted to go for it on 4th down to get the score, cutting the Carolina lead to 13–7. Before the half expired, the Panthers' John Kasay kicked a 37-yard field goal with 5 seconds left in the half, extending the lead to 16–7.

The Bears offense came out at halftime firing on all cylinders, mounting an 8-play, 68-yard drive to close to within 2 points of the Panther lead. It was a balanced drive that led to the score, with the Bears running and passing 5 times each, with Rex Grossman capping the drive with a 1-yard TD pass to Desmond Clark.

The spark provided by the offense was short-lived, as midway through the 3rd quarter, Delhomme went deep to Steve Smith again, this time for a 39-yard touchdown that put the Panthers up 23–14. Chris Thompson, a backup cornerback for the Bears, fell down on the play to let Smith slip past him.

The Bears managed to score one more time on a drive that started with 2:07 remaining in the 3rd quarter. Grossman completed 3 of 4 passes on the drive, and running back Thomas Jones almost scored on a 7-yard run. After a replay challenge by Carolina, however, the officials reversed the call to say that Jones had fumbled into the endzone, which would have resulted in a Carolina touchback. However, a major facemask penalty on Marlon McCree gave Chicago a first down at the Carolina 3. From there, fullback Jason McKie rumbled in for a touchdown, making the score 23–21 to the Panthers.

The Panthers extended their lead once more with a 1-yard Delhomme pass to tight end Kris Mangum. Kasay missed the extra point try though, making the Panthers' lead 29–21.

When the Bears offense started moving the ball once more, disaster struck for the Bears, as on a 3rd and 10 play from the Carolina 37-yard line, Grossman threw an interception to Ken Lucas.
