= 2004 Chicago Bears season =

NFL team season

- Owner: The McCaskey Family
- General manager: Jerry Angelo
- Head coach: Lovie Smith
- Home stadium: Soldier Field

Results
- Record: 5–11
- Division place: 4th NFC North
- Playoffs: Did not qualify

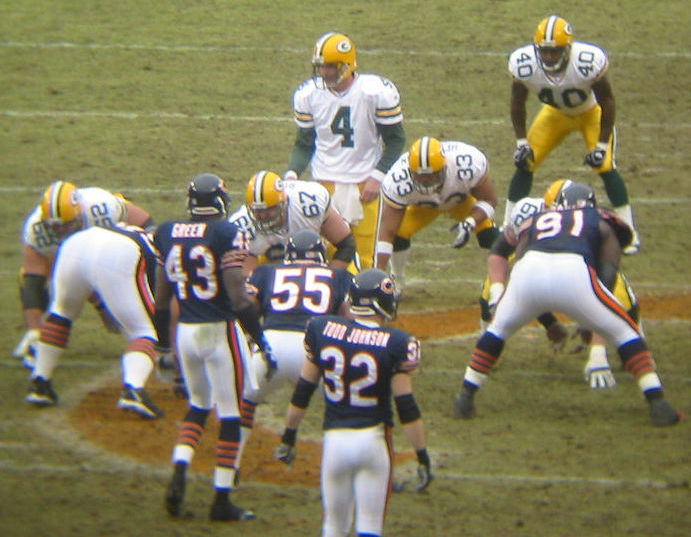
Green Bay at Chicago in week 17, January 2, 2005

The 2004 season was the Chicago Bears' 85th season in the National Football League (NFL), and the first under head coach Lovie Smith. The team was unable to improve on their 7–9 record from 2003 as they fell to a 5–11 record. The team was once again in a quarterbacking carousel after the injury of starter Rex Grossman early on in the season. This was the team's eighth losing season in the past nine seasons.

According to statistics site Football Outsiders, the 2004 Bears had the third-worst offense, play-for-play, in their ranking history. Chicago's 231 points and 3,816 offensive yards were dead-last in the league in 2004. Their team quarterback passer rating was 61.7 for the year, also last.

The Bears started four different quarterbacks in 2004 – Chad Hutchinson, Craig Krenzel, Jonathan Quinn, and Rex Grossman. Grossman (the only Bears quarterback who would average more than 200 yards passing per game in 2004) would eventually establish himself as the starter, and two seasons later, would lead the Bears to their second NFC Championship and an appearance in the Super Bowl.

== Offseason ==
| Additions | Subtractions |
|---|---|
| QB Chad Hutchinson (Cowboys) | QB Kordell Stewart (Ravens) |
| OT John Tait (Chiefs) | WR Marty Booker (traded to Dolphins) |
| G Ruben Brown (Bills) | G Chris Villarrial (Bills) |
| RB Thomas Jones (Buccaneers) | DE Phillip Daniels (Redskins) |
| DE Adewale Ogunleye (traded from Dolphins) | |
| G Michael Keathley (Chargers) | |

=== 2004 Draft ===
2004 Chicago Bears draft
| Round | Pick | Player | Position | College | Notes |
| 1 | 14 | Tommie Harris * | DT | Oklahoma | |
| 2 | 47 | Tank Johnson | DT | Washington | |
| 3 | 78 | Bernard Berrian | WR | Fresno State | |
| 4 | 110 | Nathan Vasher * | CB | Texas | |
| 4 | 112 | Leon Joe | LB | Maryland | |
| 5 | 147 | Claude Harriott | DE | Pittsburgh | |
| 5 | 148 | Craig Krenzel | QB | Ohio State | |
| 7 | 215 | Alfonso Marshall | CB | Miami (FL) | |
Made roster † Pro Football Hall of Fame * Made at least one Pro Bowl during career

== Staff ==
2004 Chicago Bears staff
| Front office: Chairman of the board – Michael McCaskey; President/chief executive officer – Ted Phillips; General manager – Jerry Angelo; Director of pro personnel – Bobby DePaul; Director of college scouting – Greg Gabriel; Head coaches: Head coach – Lovie Smith; Offensive coaches: Offensive coordinator – Terry Shea; Quarterbacks – Wade Wilson; Running backs – Tim Spencer; Wide receivers – Darryl Drake; Tight ends – Rob Boras; Offensive line – Pete Hoener; Assistant offensive line – Harold Goodwin; Offensive quality control – Mike Bajakian | Defensive coaches: Defensive coordinator – Ron Rivera; Defensive line – Karl Dunbar; Linebackers – Bob Babich; Defensive backs – Vance Bedford; Assistant defensive backs – Torrian Gray; Defensive quality control – Lloyd Lee; Special teams coaches: Special teams coordinator – Dave Toub; Assistant special teams – Charlie Coiner; Strength and conditioning: Strength and conditioning coordinator – Rusty Jones; Strength and conditioning assistant – Jim Arthur |

== Roster ==
2004 Chicago Bears roster
| Quarterbacks (QB): 11 Jeff George; 9 Chad Hutchinson; 12 Jonathan Quinn; Running backs (RB): 44 Keith Belton FB; 20 Thomas Jones; 37 Jason McKie FB; 29 Adrian Peterson; 35 Anthony Thomas; Wide receivers (WR): 80 Bernard Berrian; 87 Justin Gage; 83 David Terrell; 84 Bobby Wade; Tight ends (TE): 88 Desmond Clark; 85 John Gilmore; 89 Dustin Lyman; 82 John Owens | Offensive linemen (OL): 68 Bryan Anderson G; 75 Marc Colombo OT; 79 Steve Edwards G; 78 Aaron Gibson OT; 57 Olin Kreutz C; 69 Bo Lacy OT; 60 Terrence Metcalf G; 72 Qasim Mitchell OT; 76 John Tait OT; Defensive linemen (DL): 70 Alfonso Boone DT; 96 Alex Brown DE; 91 Tommie Harris DT; 97 Michael Haynes DE; 71 Israel Idonije DT; 99 Tank Johnson DT; 94 Alain Kashama DE; 98 Shurron Pierson DE; 95 Ian Scott DT | Linebackers (LB): 55 Lance Briggs OLB; 58 Jeremy Cain MLB; 90 Quinn Dorsey OLB; 92 Hunter Hillenmeyer MLB; 59 Joe Odom OLB; 52 Marcus Reese OLB; Defensive backs (DB): 23 Jerry Azumah CB; 25 Bobby Gray SS; 43 Mike Green SS; 32 Todd Johnson FS; 26 Todd McMillon CB; 21 R. W. McQuarters CB; 36 Jerrell Pippens CB; 27 Jason Shivers FS; 33 Charles Tillman CB; 31 Nathan Vasher CB; Special teams (ST): 2 Paul Edinger K; 65 Patrick Mannelly LS; 4 Brad Maynard P | Practice squad: 46 Derrick Ballard OLB; 49 Carl Diggs OLB; 9 Ryan Dinwiddie QB; 19 Carl Ford WR; 17 Jimmy Fryzel WR; 81 Kareem Kelly WR; 39 Fred Russell RB; 64 Cliff Washburn DE; Reserve: 30 Mike Brown S (IR); 74 Ruben Brown G (IR); 67 Darrell Campbell DT (NF-Inj.); 73 Rob Droege DT (IR); 8 Rex Grossman QB (IR); 47 Bryan Johnson FB (IR); 16 Craig Krenzel QB (IR); 22 Alfonso Marshall CB (IR); 93 Adewale Ogunleye DE (IR); 48 Gabe Reid TE (IR); 64 Rex Tucker G (IR); 54 Brian Urlacher LB (IR); 24 Cameron Worrell FS (IR); Rookies in italics 53 active, 13 reserve, 8 practice squad |

== Preseason ==
=== Schedule ===
| Week | Date | Opponent | Result | Record | Venue | Recap |
|---|---|---|---|---|---|---|
| 1 | August 12 | at St. Louis Rams | W 13–10 | 1–0 | Edward Jones Dome | Recap |
| 2 | August 21 | at San Francisco 49ers | W 20–13 | 2–0 | Soldier Field | Recap |
| 3 | August 27 | New Orleans Saints | L 13–17 | 2–1 | Soldier Field | Recap |
| 4 | September 3 | at Cleveland Browns | L 10–24 | 2–2 | FirstEnergy Stadium | Recap |

== Regular season ==
=== Schedule ===
| Week | Date | Opponent | Result | Record | Venue | Recap |
|---|---|---|---|---|---|---|
| 1 | September 12 | **Detroit Lions** | **L** 16–20 | 0–1 | Soldier Field | Recap |
| 2 | September 19 | at **Green Bay Packers** | **W** 21–10 | 1–1 | Lambeau Field | Recap |
| 3 | September 26 | at **Minnesota Vikings** | **L** 22–27 | 1–2 | Hubert H. Humphrey Metrodome | Recap |
| 4 | October 3 | Philadelphia Eagles | **L** 9–19 | 1–3 | Soldier Field | Recap |
| 5 | Bye | | | | | |
| 6 | October 17 | Washington Redskins | **L** 10–13 | 1–4 | Soldier Field | Recap |
| 7 | October 25 | at Tampa Bay Buccaneers | **L** 7–19 | 1–5 | Raymond James Stadium | Recap |
| 8 | October 31 | San Francisco 49ers | **W** 23–13 | 2–5 | Soldier Field | Recap |
| 9 | November 7 | at New York Giants | **W** 28–21 | 3–5 | Giants Stadium | Recap |
| 10 | November 14 | at Tennessee Titans | **W** 19–17 (OT) | 4–5 | The Coliseum | Recap |
| 11 | November 21 | Indianapolis Colts | **L** 10–41 | 4–6 | Soldier Field | Recap |
| 12 | November 25 | at Dallas Cowboys | **L** 7–21 | 4–7 | Texas Stadium | Recap |
| 13 | December 5 | **Minnesota Vikings** | **W** 24–14 | 5–7 | Soldier Field | Recap |
| 14 | December 12 | at Jacksonville Jaguars | **L** 3–22 | 5–8 | Alltel Stadium | Recap |
| 15 | December 19 | Houston Texans | **L** 5–24 | 5–9 | Soldier Field | Recap |
| 16 | December 26 | at **Detroit Lions** | **L** 13–19 | 5–10 | Ford Field | Recap |
| 17 | January 2 | **Green Bay Packers** | **L** 14–31 | 5–11 | Soldier Field | Recap |
Notes: * Intra-division opponents are in **bold** text. Legend: # Games played with navy uniforms. # Games played with white uniforms. # Games played with alternate orange uniforms. – Light green background indicates a victory. – Light red background indicates a loss.

=== Week 1: vs Detroit Lions ===
| | 1 | 2 | 3 | 4 | Total |
|---|---|---|---|---|---|
| **Lions** | 0 | 3 | 10 | 7 | **20** |
| Bears | 7 | 0 | 0 | 9 | **16** |

==== Scoring Summary ====
Q1 – CHI – 7:38 – Thomas Jones 2 yd TD run (Paul Edinger kick) (CHI 7–0)

Q2 – DET – 0:16 – Jason Hanson 27 yd FG (CHI 7–3)

Q3 – DET – 12:17 – Bracy Walker 92 yd blocked FG return TD (Hanson kick) (DET 10–7)

Q3 – DET – 7:37 – Jason Hanson 21 yd FG (DET 13–7)

Q4 – CHI – 12:40 – Thomas Jones 2 yd TD run (Edinger kick) (CHI 14–13)

Q4 – DET – 9:54 – 4 yd TD pass from Joey Harrington to Az-Zahir Hakim (Hanson kick) (DET 20–14)

Q4 – CHI – 1:53 – Safety, Nick Harris ran out of bounds in own end zone (DET 20–16)

=== Week 2 at Packers ===
Week Two: Chicago Bears (0–1) at Green Bay Packers (1–0)

| Quarter | 1 | 2 | 3 | 4 | Total |
|---|---|---|---|---|---|
| Bears | 0 | 14 | 7 | 0 | **21** |
| Packers | 3 | 0 | 7 | 0 | **10** |

at Lambeau Field • Green Bay, Wisconsin

- Date: September 19
- Game time: 1:00 p.m. EDT
- Game weather: Mostly sunny • 74 °F (23 °C) • Wind South 15 miles per hour (24 km/h; 13 kn)
- Game attendance: 70,668
- Referee: Bernie Kukar
- TV: Fox
- GameBook

Game information

Bears

- Rex Grossman
  10/18, 132 Yds, TD, INT
- Thomas Jones
  23 Rush, 152 Yds, TD
- Desmond Clark
  2 Rec, 43 Yds

Packers

- Brett Favre
  24/42, 252 Yds, TD, 2 INT
- Ahman Green
  24 Rush, 128 Yds
- Javon Walker
  7 Rec, 102 Yds

Scoring summary

| Quarter | Time | Drive | | | Team | Scoring information | Score | |
| Quarter | Time | Plays | Yards | TOP | Team | Scoring information | CHI | GB |
|---|---|---|---|---|---|---|---|---|
| 1 | 9:02 | 10 | 67 | 5:58 | Packers | 25-yard field goal by Ryan Longwell | 0 | 3 |
| 2 | 7:40 | 7 | 60 | 3:13 | Bears | Bryan Johnson 11-yard touchdown reception from Rex Grossman, Paul Edinger kick good | 7 | 3 |
| 2 | 1:44 | | | | Bears | Fumble recovery returned 95 yards for touchdown by Mike Brown, Paul Edinger kick good | 14 | 3 |
| 3 | 11:31 | 6 | 79 | 3:29 | Bears | Thomas Jones 1-yard touchdown run, Paul Edinger kick good | 21 | 3 |
| 3 | 1:46 | 19 | 99 | 9:45 | Packers | Robert Ferguson 18-yard touchdown reception from Brett Favre, Ryan Longwell kick good | 21 | 10 |
| "TOP" = time of possession. For other American football terms, see Glossary of American football. | | | | | | | 21 | 10 |

=== Week 3: at Minnesota Vikings ===
at the Hubert H. Humphrey Metrodome in Minneapolis, Minnesota

| | 1 | 2 | 3 | 4 | Total |
|---|---|---|---|---|---|
| Bears | 3 | 3 | 0 | 16 | **22** |
| **Vikings** | 0 | 10 | 7 | 10 | **27** |

==== Scoring summary ====
Q1 – CHI – 8:08 – Paul Edinger 34 yd FG (CHI 3–0)

Q2 – CHI – 13:41 – Paul Edinger 23 yd FG (CHI 6–0)

Q2 – MIN – 8:57 – 3 yd TD pass from Daunte Culpepper to Randy Moss (Morten Andersen kick) (MIN 7–6)

Q2 – MIN – 5:09 – Morten Andersen 42 yd FG (MIN 10–6)

Q3 – MIN – 10:58 – Daunte Culpepper 1 yd TD run (Andersen kick) (MIN 17–6)

Q4 – CHI – 14:46 – Paul Edinger 32 yd FG (MIN 17–9)

Q4 – MIN – 11:20 – Morten Andersen 24 yd FG (MIN 20–9)

Q4 – CHI – 6:20 – Thomas Jones 1 yd TD run (2 pt conversion failed) (MIN 20–15)

Q4 – MIN – 5:39 – 2 yd TD pass from Daunte Culpepper to Randy Moss (Andersen kick) (MIN 27–15)

Q4 – CHI – 2:00 – Rex Grossman 6 yd TD run (Edinger kick) (MIN 27–22)

=== Week 4: vs Philadelphia Eagles ===
at Soldier Field in Chicago

| | 1 | 2 | 3 | 4 | Total |
|---|---|---|---|---|---|
| **Eagles** | 3 | 13 | 3 | 0 | **19** |
| Bears | 0 | 3 | 0 | 6 | **9** |

==== Scoring summary ====
Q1 – PHI – 5:00 – David Akers 51 yd FG (PHI 3–0)

Q2 – PHI – 10:59 – David Akers 42 yd FG (PHI 6–0)

Q2 – PHI – 6:03 – 11 yd TD pass from Donovan McNabb to Terrell Owens (Akers kick) (PHI 13–0)

Q2 – PHI – 1:57 – David Akers 42 yd FG (PHI 16–0)

Q2 – CHI – 0:06 – Paul Edinger 25 yd FG (PHI 16–3)

Q3 – PHI – 4:41 – David Akers 40 yd FG (PHI 19–3)

Q4 – CHI – 3:57 – 2 yd TD pass from Jonathan Quinn to Bryan Johnson (2 pt conversion failed) (PHI 19–9)

=== Week 6: vs Washington Redskins ===
at Soldier Field in Chicago

| | 1 | 2 | 3 | 4 | Total |
|---|---|---|---|---|---|
| **Redskins** | 3 | 7 | 0 | 3 | **13** |
| Bears | 0 | 7 | 0 | 3 | **10** |

==== Scoring summary ====
Q1 – WAS – 5:41 – Ola Kimrin 41 yd FG (WAS 3–0)

Q2 – WAS – 14:53 – 18 yd TD pass from Mark Brunell to Rod Gardner (Kimrin kick) (WAS 10–0)

Q2 – CHI – 5:36 – Jerry Azumah 70 yd interception return TD (Paul Edinger kick) (WAS 10–7)

Q4 – WAS – 11:13 – Ola Kimrin 26 yd FG (WAS 13–7)

Q4 – CHI – 5:10 – Paul Edinger 46 yd FG (WAS 13–10)

=== Week 7: at Tampa Bay Buccaneers ===
at Raymond James Stadium in Tampa, Florida

| | 1 | 2 | 3 | 4 | Total |
|---|---|---|---|---|---|
| Bears | 0 | 0 | 7 | 0 | **7** |
| **Buccaneers** | 0 | 10 | 3 | 6 | **19** |

==== Scoring summary ====
Q2 – TB – 13:25 – Martín Gramática 22 yd FG (TB 3–0)

Q2 – TB – 0:48 – 6 yd TD pass from Brian Griese to Michael Clayton (Gramática kick) (TB 10–0)

Q3 – TB – 12:23 – Martín Gramática 22 yd FG (TB 13–0)

Q3 – CHI – 3:45 – Thomas Jones 1 yd TD run (Paul Edinger kick) (TB 13–7)

Q4 – TB – 8:52 – Michael Pittman 3 yd TD run (2 pt conversion failed) (TB 19–7)

=== Week 8: vs San Francisco 49ers ===
at Soldier Field in Chicago

| | 1 | 2 | 3 | 4 | Total |
|---|---|---|---|---|---|
| 49ers | 10 | 3 | 0 | 0 | **13** |
| **Bears** | 7 | 6 | 0 | 10 | **23** |

==== Scoring summary ====
Q1 – CHI – 13:01 – 49 yd TD pass from Craig Krenzel to Bernard Berrian (Paul Edinger kick) (CHI 7–0)

Q1 – SF – 5:26 – Dwaine Carpenter 80 yd fumble return TD (Todd Peterson kick) (7–7)

Q1 – SF – 0:40 – Todd Peterson 48 yd FG (SF 10–7)

Q2 – CHI – 13:27 – Paul Edinger 52 yd FG (10–10)

Q2 – SF – 6:20 – Todd Peterson 51 yd FG (SF 13–10)

Q2 – CHI – 4:35 – Paul Edinger 45 yd FG (13–13)

Q4 – CHI – 13:59 – Paul Edinger 27 yd FG (CHI 16–13)

Q4 – CHI – 3:52 – Nathan Vasher 71 yd interception return TD (Edinger kick) (CHI 23–13)

=== Week 9: at New York Giants ===
at Giants Stadium in East Rutherford, New Jersey

| | 1 | 2 | 3 | 4 | Total |
|---|---|---|---|---|---|
| **Bears** | 0 | 20 | 0 | 8 | **28** |
| Giants | 14 | 0 | 0 | 7 | **21** |

==== Scoring summary ====
Q1 – NYG – 8:03 – Tiki Barber 3 yd TD run (Steve Christie kick) (NYG 7–0)

Q1 – NYG – 3:54 – Tiki Barber 1 yd TD run (Christie kick) (NYG 14–0)

Q2 – CHI – 5:13 – 35 yd TD pass from Craig Krenzel to Bernard Berrian (Paul Edinger kick) (NYG 14–7)

Q2 – CHI – 2:35 – Anthony Thomas 4 yd TD run (Edinger kick) (14–14)

Q2 – CHI – 1:09 – Paul Edinger 22 yd FG (CHI 17–14)

Q2 – CHI – 0:00 – Paul Edinger 21 yd FG (CHI 20–14)

Q4 – CHI – 7:44 – Anthony Thomas 41 yd TD run (Craig Krenzel run for 2 pt conversion) (CHI 28–14)

Q4 – NYG – 1:56 – 1 yd TD pass from Kurt Warner to Jeremy Shockey (Christie kick) (CHI 28–21)

=== Week 10: at Tennessee Titans ===
at The Coliseum in Nashville, Tennessee

| | 1 | 2 | 3 | 4 | OT | Total |
|---|---|---|---|---|---|---|
| **Bears** | 0 | 7 | 7 | 3 | 2 | **19** |
| Titans | 7 | 0 | 0 | 10 | 0 | **17** |

==== Scoring summary ====
Q1 – TEN – 2:17 – 29 yd TD pass from Billy Volek to Derrick Mason (Gary Anderson kick) (TEN 7–0)

Q2 – CHI – 0:18 – Michael Haynes 45 yd interception return TD (Paul Edinger kick) (7–7)

Q3 – CHI – 11:04 – R. W. McQuarters 75 yd punt return TD (Edinger kick) (CHI 14–7)

Q4 – TEN – 12:55 – Gary Anderson 33 yd FG (CHI 14–10)

Q4 – TEN – 6:00 – 47 yd TD pass from Billy Volek to Drew Bennett (Anderson kick) (TEN 17–14)

Q4 – CHI – 0:52 – Paul Edinger 29 yd FG (17–17)

OT – CHI – 11:43 – Safety, Fred Miller tackled in own end zone by Adewale Ogunleye (CHI 19–17)

=== Week 11: vs Indianapolis Colts ===
at Soldier Field in Chicago

| | 1 | 2 | 3 | 4 | Total |
|---|---|---|---|---|---|
| **Colts** | 7 | 20 | 14 | 0 | **41** |
| Bears | 3 | 0 | 0 | 7 | **10** |

==== Scoring summary ====
Q1 – IND – 9:05 – 14 yd TD pass from Peyton Manning to Marcus Pollard (Mike Vanderjagt kick) (IND 7–0)

Q1 – CHI – 2:12 – Paul Edinger 51 yd FG (IND 7–3)

Q2 – IND – 14:04 – 35 yd TD pass from Peyton Manning to Reggie Wayne (Vanderjagt kick) (IND 14–3)

Q2 – IND – 10:56 – Mike Vanderjagt 34 yd FG (IND 17–3)

Q2 – IND – 5:41 – 10 yd TD pass from Peyton Manning to Marvin Harrison (Vanderjagt kick) (IND 24–3)

Q2 – IND – 0:59 – Mike Vanderjagt 20 yd FG (IND 27–3)

Q3 – IND – 8:26 – 27 yd TD pass from Peyton Manning to Reggie Wayne (Vanderjagt kick) (IND 34–3)

Q3 – IND – 0:42 – Edgerrin James 11 yd TD run (Vanderjagt kick) (IND 41–3)

Q4 – CHI – 1:37 – 2 yd TD pass from Craig Krenzel to Dustin Lyman (Edinger kick) (IND 41–10)

=== Week 12: at Dallas Cowboys ===
at Texas Stadium in Irving, Texas

| | 1 | 2 | 3 | 4 | Total |
|---|---|---|---|---|---|
| Bears | 0 | 7 | 0 | 0 | **7** |
| **Cowboys** | 7 | 0 | 0 | 14 | **21** |

==== Scoring summary ====
Q1 – DAL – 10:43 – Julius Jones 33 yd TD run (Billy Cundiff kick) (DAL 7–0)

Q2 – CHI – 5:57 – R. W. McQuarters 45 yd interception return TD (Paul Edinger kick) (7–7)

Q4 – DAL – 11:07 – 5 yd TD pass from Vinny Testaverde to Darian Barnes (Cundiff kick) (DAL 14–7)

Q4 – DAL – 7:00 – Julius Jones 4 yd TD run (Cundiff kick) (DAL 21–7)

=== Week 13: vs Minnesota Vikings ===
at Soldier Field in Chicago

| | 1 | 2 | 3 | 4 | Total |
|---|---|---|---|---|---|
| Vikings | 7 | 7 | 0 | 0 | **14** |
| **Bears** | 7 | 10 | 0 | 7 | **24** |

==== Scoring summary ====
Q1 – CHI – 4:47 – 6 yd TD pass from Chad Hutchinson to Desmond Clark (Paul Edinger kick) (CHI 7–0)

Q1 – MIN – 1:19 – 4 yd TD pass from Daunte Culpepper to Nate Burleson (Morten Andersen kick) (7–7)

Q2 – CHI – 11:22 – Paul Edinger 53 yd FG (CHI 10–7)

Q2 – MIN – 2:23 – 40 yd TD pass from Daunte Culpepper to Marcus Robinson (Andersen kick) (MIN 14–10)

Q2 – CHI – 0:22 – 15 yd TD pass from Chad Hutchinson to David Terrell (Edinger kick) (CHI 17–14)

Q4 – CHI – 10:23 – 5 yd TD pass from Chad Hutchinson to Jason McKie (Edinger kick) (CHI 24–14)

=== Week 14: at Jacksonville Jaguars ===
at Alltel Stadium in Jacksonville, Florida

| | 1 | 2 | 3 | 4 | Total |
|---|---|---|---|---|---|
| Bears | 0 | 3 | 0 | 0 | **3** |
| **Jaguars** | 7 | 3 | 3 | 9 | **22** |

==== Scoring summary ====
Q1 – JAX – 3:18 – 6 yd TD pass from Byron Leftwich to Reggie Williams (Josh Scobee kick) (JAX 7–0)

Q2 – CHI – 1:44 – Paul Edinger 42 yd FG (JAX 7–3)

Q2 – JAX – 0:31 – Josh Scobee 30 yd FG (JAX 10–3)

Q3 – JAX – 5:36 – Josh Scobee 25 yd FG (JAX 13–3)

Q4 – JAX – 13:48 – Safety, Chad Hutchinson sacked in own end zone by Daryl Smith (JAX 15–3)

Q4 – JAX – 9:26 – 31 yd TD pass from Byron Leftwich to Jimmy Smith (Scobee kick) (JAX 22–3)

=== Week 15: vs Houston Texans ===
at Soldier Field in Chicago

| | 1 | 2 | 3 | 4 | Total |
|---|---|---|---|---|---|
| **Texans** | 0 | 7 | 0 | 17 | **24** |
| Bears | 0 | 0 | 2 | 3 | **5** |

==== Scoring summary ====
Q2 – HOU – 0:27 – 37 yd TD pass from David Carr to Corey Bradford (Kris Brown kick) (HOU 7–0)

Q3 – CHI – 4:06 – Safety, intentional grounding by David Carr in own end zone (HOU 7–2)

Q4 – CHI – 14:09 – Paul Edinger 43 yd FG (HOU 7–5)

Q4 – HOU – 11:37 – Kris Brown 20 yd FG (HOU 10–5)

Q4 – HOU – 4:23 – Domanick Davis 11 yd TD run (Brown kick) (HOU 17–5)

Q4 – HOU – 2:37 – Charlie Anderson 60 yd fumble return TD (Brown kick) (HOU 24–5)

=== Week 16: at Detroit Lions ===
at Ford Field in Detroit, Michigan

| | 1 | 2 | 3 | 4 | Total |
|---|---|---|---|---|---|
| Bears | 0 | 0 | 6 | 7 | **13** |
| **Lions** | 3 | 13 | 0 | 3 | **19** |

==== Scoring summary ====
Q1 – DET – 3:06 – Jason Hanson 31 yd FG (DET 3–0)

Q2 – DET – 11:30 – Kevin Jones 1 yd TD run (Hanson kick) (DET 10–0)

Q2 – DET – 5:50 – Jason Hanson 39 yd FG (DET 13–0)

Q2 – DET – 0:00 – Jason Hanson 34 yd FG (DET 16–0)

Q3 – CHI – 3:40 – Lance Briggs 38 yd interception return TD (2 pt conversion failed) (DET 16–6)

Q4 – DET – 11:29 – Jason Hanson 40 yd FG (DET 19–6)

Q4 – CHI – 7:04 – 15 yd TD pass from Chad Hutchinson to Jason McKie (Paul Edinger kick) (DET 19–13)

=== Week 17: vs Green Bay Packers ===
at Soldier Field in Chicago

| | 1 | 2 | 3 | 4 | Total |
|---|---|---|---|---|---|
| **Packers** | 7 | 21 | 3 | 0 | **31** |
| Bears | 7 | 0 | 7 | 0 | **14** |

==== Scoring summary ====
Q1 – CHI – 12:54 – Thomas Jones 2 yd TD run (Paul Edinger kick) (CHI 7–0)

Q1 – GB – 3:22 – 17 yd TD pass from Brett Favre to Bubba Franks (Ryan Longwell kick) (7–7)

Q2 – GB – 13:16 – 38 yd TD pass from Brett Favre to William Henderson (Longwell kick) (GB 14–7)

Q2 – GB – 11:52 – Darren Sharper 43 yd interception return TD (Longwell kick) (GB 21–7)

Q2 – GB – 6:14 – 25 yd TD pass from Craig Nall to Javon Walker (Longwell kick) (GB 28–7)

Q3 – CHI – 5:48 – Thomas Jones 1 yd TD run (Edinger kick) (GB 28–14)

Q3 – GB – 0:41 – Ryan Longwell 20 yd FG (GB 31–14)

== Standings ==
NFC North
| | W | L | T | PCT | DIV | CONF | PF | PA | STK |
|---|---|---|---|---|---|---|---|---|---|
| ^{(3)} Green Bay Packers | 10 | 6 | 0 | .625 | 5–1 | 9–3 | 424 | 380 | W2 |
| ^{(6)} Minnesota Vikings | 8 | 8 | 0 | .500 | 3–3 | 5–7 | 405 | 395 | L2 |
| Detroit Lions | 6 | 10 | 0 | .375 | 2–4 | 5–7 | 296 | 350 | L1 |
| Chicago Bears | 5 | 11 | 0 | .313 | 2–4 | 4–8 | 231 | 331 | L4 |

NFC
| # | Team | Division | W | L | T | PCT | DIV | CONF | SOS | SOV | STK |
|---|---|---|---|---|---|---|---|---|---|---|---|
Division leaders
| 1 | Philadelphia Eagles | East | 13 | 3 | 0 | .813 | 6–0 | 11–1 | .453 | .409 | L2 |
| 2 | Atlanta Falcons | South | 11 | 5 | 0 | .688 | 4–2 | 8–4 | .420 | .432 | L2 |
| 3 | Green Bay Packers | North | 10 | 6 | 0 | .625 | 5–1 | 9–3 | .457 | .419 | W2 |
| 4 | Seattle Seahawks | West | 9 | 7 | 0 | .563 | 3–3 | 8–4 | .445 | .368 | W2 |
Wild cards
| 5 (Note: St. Louis clinched the NFC #5 seed instead of Minnesota or New Orleans based on better conference record (7–5 to Minnesota’s 5–7 to New Orleans’ 6–6).) | St. Louis Rams | West | 8 | 8 | 0 | .500 | 5–1 | 7–5 | .488 | .438 | W2 |
| 6 (Note: Minnesota clinched the NFC #6 seed instead of New Orleans based on head-to-head victory.) | Minnesota Vikings | North | 8 | 8 | 0 | .500 | 3–3 | 5–7 | .480 | .406 | L2 |
Did not qualify for the postseason
| 7 | New Orleans Saints | South | 8 | 8 | 0 | .500 | 3–3 | 6–6 | .465 | .427 | W4 |
| 8 | Carolina Panthers | South | 7 | 9 | 0 | .438 | 3–3 | 6–6 | .496 | .366 | L1 |
| 9 (Note: Detroit finished ahead of Arizona and New York Giants based upon head-to-head record (2–0 versus Arizona’s 1–1 and New York Giants’ 0–2). Division tiebreak was initially used to eliminate Dallas and Washington.) | Detroit Lions | North | 6 | 10 | 0 | .375 | 2–4 | 5–7 | .496 | .417 | L2 |
| 10 | Arizona Cardinals | West | 6 | 10 | 0 | .375 | 2–4 | 5–7 | .461 | .417 | W1 |
| 11 (Note: New York Giants finished ahead of Dallas and Washington in the NFC East based on better head-to-head record (3–1 to Dallas‘ 2–2 to Washington’s 1–3).) | New York Giants | East | 6 | 10 | 0 | .375 | 3–3 | 5–7 | .516 | .417 | W1 |
| 12 (Note: Dallas finished ahead of Washington in the NFC East based on head-to-head sweep.) | Dallas Cowboys | East | 6 | 10 | 0 | .375 | 2–4 | 5–7 | .516 | .375 | L1 |
| 13 | Washington Redskins | East | 6 | 10 | 0 | .375 | 1–5 | 6–6 | .477 | .333 | W1 |
| 14 (Note: Tampa Bay finished ahead of Chicago based upon head-to-head victory.) | Tampa Bay Buccaneers | South | 5 | 11 | 0 | .313 | 2–4 | 4–8 | .477 | .413 | L4 |
| 15 | Chicago Bears | North | 5 | 11 | 0 | .313 | 2–4 | 4–8 | .465 | .388 | L4 |
| 16 | San Francisco 49ers | West | 2 | 14 | 0 | .125 | 2–4 | 2–10 | .488 | .375 | L3 |
Tiebreakers (Note: When breaking ties for three or more teams under the NFL's rules, they are first broken within divisions, then comparing only the highest-ranked remaining team from each division.)
