= Nathan Vasher =

American football player (born 1981)

No. 31, 30
- Position: Cornerback

Personal information
- Born: November 17, 1981 (age 45); Wichita Falls, Texas, U.S.
- Listed height: 5 ft 10 in (1.78 m)
- Listed weight: 185 lb (84 kg)

Career information
- High school: Texas (Texarkana, Texas)
- College: Texas
- NFL draft: 2004: 4th round, 110th overall pick

Career history

Playing
- Chicago Bears (2004–2009); San Diego Chargers (2010)*; Detroit Lions (2010)
- * Offseason or practice squad member only

Coaching
- Texas (2011–2013) Student assistant coach; Chicago Bears (2016) Intern assistant coach; Trinity International University (2017) Cornerback coach; Carmel Catholic (2018–2019) Assistant Coach; Texas (2020) volunteer assistant coach; Regents School of Austin (2025-2026) volunteer assistant coach

Awards and highlights
- Second-team All-Pro (2005); Pro Bowl (2005); Second-team All-American (2003); First-team All-Big 12 (2003); 2× Second-team All-Big 12 (2001, 2002); 2003 Cotton Bowl Classic champion; 2001 Holiday Bowl champion

Career NFL statistics
- Total tackles: 193
- Sacks: 1.0
- Forced fumbles: 2
- Fumble recoveries: 1
- Interceptions: 20
- Total touchdowns: 3
- Stats at Pro Football Reference

Nathaniel DeWayne Vasher (born November 17, 1981) is an American former professional football player who was a cornerback for seven seasons in the National Football League (NFL). He was an All-American for the Texas Longhorns where he played college football for four seasons. He was selected by the Chicago Bears in the fourth round of the 2004 NFL draft and with them became a Pro Bowler and played in Super Bowl XLI. He was also a member of the San Diego Chargers and Detroit Lions.

== Early life ==
A first team all-state selection at both cornerback and wide receiver at Texas High School in Texarkana, Texas, Vasher was recruited by the University of Texas at Austin.

== College career ==
He started at strong safety for the Longhorns in 2001 and at cornerback in 2002 and 2003. He intercepted 17 passes in his college career, tying the school record. He also returned punts and kickoffs and earned All-America honors as a punt returner in 2001. In his senior year he earned All-Big 12 honors, third-team All-America recognition and was a Jim Thorpe Award semifinalist. He helped the Longhorns win the 2001 Holiday Bowl and the 2002 Cotton Bowl.

He set several records. In his senior year he set the single-season school record for pass break-ups with 26 and the career record with 64, which was also a Big 12 record. He also tied the school's career interceptions record with 17. He set the school record for punt return yards with 1,314 career yards. In his sophomore year, he tied then-UT season record with seven interceptions in a season. He tied the then school career record with 2 punt returns for a TD.

In 2017, he was inducted into the Longhorns Hall of Honor.

== Professional career ==
Pre-draft measurables
Height	Weight	Arm length	Hand span
5 ft 10 in (1.78 m)	177 lb (80 kg)	30 5/8 in (0.78 m)	8 1/2 in (0.22 m)
All values from NFL Combine

=== Chicago Bears ===
The Chicago Bears selected Vasher in the fourth round of 2004 NFL draft with the 110th overall pick. He began his career with the team as a back-up cornerback, but became a starter by the fourth week of the season. Vasher became the Bears’ top cornerback after Charles Tillman was sidelined with an injury. In one of his best games of the season, Vasher intercepted one of Ken Dorsey’s passes and returned it for a 71-yard touchdown.

Vasher had the best season of his career in 2005, when he led the Bears and National Football Conference with eight interceptions. He also set a record for the longest return of any kind when he returned Joe Nedney’s missed 52-yard field goal for a 108-yard touchdown. The record was later tied by teammate Devin Hester (who returned a missed Jay Feely field goal for a score on November 12, 2006, against the Giants) and Ellis Hobbs (who returned a kickoff for a touchdown on September 9, 2007, against the Jets). The record is now held by Antonio Cromartie, who returned a missed Ryan Longwell field goal 109 yards for a touchdown for San Diego against Minnesota on November 4, 2007. Vasher completed the season with an invitation to the Pro Bowl, as well as two player of the week awards. He was also 10th in voting for the AP's NFL Defensive Player of the year and was a 2nd Team all Pro.

Vasher missed portions of the 2006 season on account of injuries and was limited to only three interceptions. He played a pivotal role in the Bears’ National Football Conference Championship victory by recovering a fumble and also intercepting Drew Brees in the game's final minutes. The next week in Super Bowl XLI he assigned to cover Marvin Harrison, one of the Indianapolis Colts’ top receivers, and limited him to 59 yards with 3 pass deflections, while also assisting Chris Harris in an interception.

During the subsequent off-season, the Bears re-signed Vasher and Tillman to long-term contracts. He sustained a groin injury during the third game of the 2007 season and was forced to miss the next ten games while recuperating. He made his return during a Monday Night Football match up against the Minnesota Vikings, in which he intercepted a pass and also helped Brian Urlacher record one by delivering a hit to Robert Ferguson. Vasher continued to struggle with injuries, and lost his starting job to Zack Bowman in 2009.

On March 17, 2010, Vasher was released from the Bears.

=== San Diego Chargers ===
Vasher signed a two-year contract with the San Diego Chargers on March 29, 2010, but was released in September before playing in a game with the team.

=== Detroit Lions ===
On September 13, 2010, Vasher signed with the Detroit Lions. He was re-signed to a one-year deal on March 4, 2011. On September 3, 2011 Vasher was cut by the Lions.

== NFL career statistics ==
Legend
**Bold**	Career high

=== Regular season ===
Year	Team	Games		Tackles					Interceptions					Fumbles			
Year	Team	GP	GS	Cmb	Solo	Ast	Sck	TFL	Int	Yds	TD	Lng	PD	FF	FR	Yds	TD
2004	CHI	16	7	37	34	3	0.0	1	5	**177**	**1**	**71**	9	0	**1**	**12**	0
2005	CHI	16	15	**47**	**40**	7	0.0	0	**8**	145	**1**	46	**16**	**2**	0	0	0
2006	CHI	14	13	45	33	**12**	0.0	0	3	11	0	7	8	0	0	0	0
2007	CHI	4	2	8	7	1	**1.0**	1	1	34	0	34	2	0	0	0	0
2008	CHI	8	7	22	21	1	0.0	0	1	0	0	0	8	0	0	0	0
2009	CHI	15	2	15	10	5	0.0	0	1	1	0	1	1	0	0	0	0
2010	DET	14	5	19	15	4	0.0	**2**	1	0	0	0	5	0	0	0	0
		87	51	193	160	33	1.0	4	20	368	2	71	49	2	1	12	0

=== Postseason ===
Year	Team	Games		Tackles					Interceptions					Fumbles			
Year	Team	GP	GS	Cmb	Solo	Ast	Sck	TFL	Int	Yds	TD	Lng	PD	FF	FR	Yds	TD
2005	CHI	1	1	4	3	1	0.0	**1**	0	0	0	0	0	0	0	0	0
2006	CHI	3	3	**13**	**11**	**2**	0.0	0	**1**	0	0	0	**4**	0	**1**	**14**	0
		4	4	17	14	3	0.0	1	1	0	0	0	4	0	1	14	0

== Personal life ==
Vasher was nicknamed "ESPN3" in college, and "The Interceptor" by Bears fans due to his many interceptions.

His nephew, T. J. Vasher, is currently a wide receiver for the Houston Roughnecks of the United Football League.

He returned to UT after his NFL career, worked as a student assistant coach and earned his bachelor's degree in applied learning and development in the spring of 2014. In 2016 he received a Bill Walsh Minority Coaching Fellowship and spent the year as an intern coach with the Bears. In 2017 he went to work on the coaching staff at Trinity International University, working with cornerbacks.

In 2018, Vasher and former Bears teammate Johnny Knox became assistant coaches at Carmel High School under ex-Bear Blake Annen. he left in 2020 to be an volunteer assistant coach at Texas.
