= Blake Annen =

American football player and coach (born 1991)

No. 84
- Position: Tight end

Personal information
- Born: May 28, 1991 (age 35); Upper Arlington, Ohio, U.S.
- Listed height: 6 ft 4 in (1.93 m)
- Listed weight: 247 lb (112 kg)

Career information
- High school: Upper Arlington
- College: Cincinnati
- NFL draft: 2014: undrafted

Career history
- Philadelphia Eagles (2014)*; Chicago Bears (2014); New Orleans Saints (2015)*; Green Bay Packers (2015)*; Buffalo Bills (2015–2016)
- * Offseason or practice squad member only

Awards and highlights
- First-team All-AAC (2013)
- Stats at Pro Football Reference

Blake David Annen (born May 28, 1991) is an American former professional football player who was a tight end for the Chicago Bears of the National Football League (NFL). He played college football for the Cincinnati Bearcats. He was also a member of the Philadelphia Eagles, New Orleans Saints, Green Bay Packers, and Buffalo Bills.

== Early life ==
Annen played high school football for the Upper Arlington High School Golden Bears in Upper Arlington, Ohio. He helped the Golden Bears win the Ohio Capital Conference Central Division Championship in 2008. He recorded 30 receptions for 800 yards and 12 touchdowns in his high school career. He was named the top tight end in the state by OhioVarsity.com.

== College career ==
Annen played for the Cincinnati Bearcats from 2010 to 2013. He was redshirted in 2009.

== Professional career ==
=== Pre-draft ===
Annen ran his 40-yard dash time at 4.41 seconds at Cincinnati's 2014 Pro Day in addition to posting 25 reps on the bench press, which ultimately made him a priority undrafted free agent. He was rated the 12th best tight end in the 2014 NFL draft by NFLDraftScout.com.

=== Philadelphia Eagles ===
Annen signed with the Philadelphia Eagles on May 10, 2014, after going undrafted. He was released by the Eagles on August 23.

=== Chicago Bears ===
Annen was signed to the Chicago Bears' practice squad on September 18, 2014. He was promoted to the active roster on November 8. Annen made his NFL debut on November 23, against the Tampa Bay Buccaneers. He made five total appearances for Chicago during his rookie campaign.

Annen was released by the Bears on September 2, 2015.

=== New Orleans Saints ===
On September 7, 2015, the New Orleans Saints signed Annen to their practice squad. On September 15, Annen was released by the Saints.

=== Green Bay Packers ===
On September 30, 2015, the Green Bay Packers signed Annen to their practice squad. On October 16, he was released by the Packers.

=== Buffalo Bills ===
On December 15, 2015, the Buffalo Bills signed Annen to their practice squad. He was waived/injured by the Bills on September 2, 2016, and was placed on injured reserve after clearing waivers.

On June 13, 2017, Annen was waived by the Bills.

== Post-playing career ==
In 2018, Annen was hired as the head football coach at Carmel High School. As assistant coaches, he hired former Bears Johnny Knox and Nathan Vasher; the three had worked together at EFT Football Academy in Highland Park, Illinois. In Annen's first year, the Corsairs improved from their 1–8 record in 2017 to 4–5. Another ex-Bear in Jason McKie became running backs coach in 2019. Annen resigned in October to return to his family in Ohio.
