= Airese Currie =

American gridiron football player (born 1982)

No. 2, 17
- Position: Wide receiver

Personal information
- Born: November 16, 1982 (age 43); Lumberton, North Carolina, U.S.
- Listed height: 5 ft 11 in (1.80 m)
- Listed weight: 185 lb (84 kg)

Career information
- High school: Columbia (SC) Richland Northeast
- College: Clemson
- NFL draft: 2005: 5th round, 140th overall pick

Career history
- Chicago Bears (2005–2006); BC Lions (2007); Hamilton Tiger-Cats (2009)

Awards and highlights
- First-team All-ACC (2004)
- Stats at Pro Football Reference
- Stats at CFL.ca (archive)

Airese K. Currie (born November 16, 1982) is an American former professional football wide receiver. He was selected by the Chicago Bears in the fifth round of the 2005 NFL draft. He played college football for the Clemson Tigers.

Currie was also a member of the BC Lions and Hamilton Tiger-Cats.

== Early life ==
Currie attended Richland Northeast High School in Columbia, South Carolina, and was a letterman in football and track. In track, he was the South Carolina state champion on the 200 and the 400 meter dashes, and ran a personal best of 10.22 seconds on the 100 meter dash.

== College career ==
Currie attended Clemson University and was a letterman in football and track. In track, he was a three-time All-Atlantic Coast Conference selection, and as a senior, he won the NCAA Regional East title on the 100 meter dash.

=== Track and field ===
Currie was also a track star. He was a three-time All-Atlantic Coast Conference selection, and as a senior, he won the NCAA Regional East title on the 100 meter dash, posting a time of 10.22 seconds.

In 2004, he ran anchor for the Tigers' 4 × 100 meter relay team, which was ranked as the 14th-fastest time of that season. He also ran the 60 meters and 200 meters, posting personal bests of 6.79 seconds and 20.65 seconds, respectively.

Personal bests

Event	Time (seconds)	Venue	Date
55 meters	6.59	Columbia,	January 12, 2013
60 meters	6.79	Chapel Hill,	February 22, 2003
100 meters	10.22	Clemson,	May 8, 2004
200 meters	20.65	Fairfax,	May 31, 2003

== Professional career ==
Pre-draft measurables
Height	Weight	40-yard dash	10-yard split	20-yard split	20-yard shuttle	Three-cone drill	Vertical jump	Broad jump
5 ft 11 in (1.80 m)	186 lb (84 kg)	4.49 s	1.63 s	2.65 s	4.07 s	7.07 s	38 in (0.97 m)	10 ft 5 in (3.18 m)
All values from NFL Combine

=== Chicago Bears ===
He was selected with the fourth pick of the fifth round of the 2005 NFL draft out of Clemson University. He spent his entire rookie season in 2005 with the Chicago Bears on injured reserve. In the 2006 season he was again placed on injured reserve on September 29, 2006, soon after playing his first NFL game. He was released on May 7, 2007.

=== Hamilton Tiger-Cats ===
Currie was signed by the Hamilton Tiger-Cats on April 9, 2009.
