= Hunter Hillenmeyer =

American football player (born 1980)

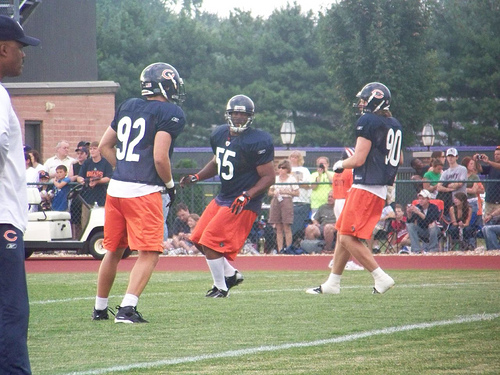
- Hillenmeyer (92) with the Chicago Bears in 2008

No. 92
- Position: Linebacker

Personal information
- Born: October 28, 1980 (age 46); Nashville, Tennessee, U.S.
- Listed height: 6 ft 4 in (1.93 m)
- Listed weight: 238 lb (108 kg)

Career information
- High school: Montgomery Bell Academy (Nashville)
- College: Vanderbilt
- NFL draft: 2003: 5th round, 166th overall pick

Career history
- Green Bay Packers (2003); Chicago Bears (2003–2010)

Awards and highlights
- First-team All-SEC (2002)

Career NFL statistics
- Total tackles: 396
- Sacks: 7
- Forced fumbles: 6
- Fumble recoveries: 4
- Interceptions: 2
- Stats at Pro Football Reference

Hunter Taverner Hillenmeyer (born October 28, 1980) is an American former professional football player who was a linebacker in the National Football League (NFL). He was selected by the Green Bay Packers in the fifth round of the 2003 NFL draft and played for the Chicago Bears from 2003 to 2010. Hillenmeyer attended high school at Montgomery Bell Academy and played college football for the Vanderbilt Commodores.

He is a columnist for TheStreet.com.

== Early life ==
Growing up in Nashville, Hillenmeyer attended Harding Academy before moving onto Montgomery Bell Academy (MBA). Hillenmeyer was a two-time All-state, All-region and All-district selection at Montgomery Bell Academy playing linebacker, defensive end, tight end and punter for the Big Red, including the school's 1998 state championship team. He lettered 3 years in football, 3 years in track and 2 years in tennis.

== College career ==
Hillenmeyer was a four-year letterwinner at Vanderbilt University (1999–2002) where he saw action in 45 games, starting the final 23 (every contest from 2000 to 2002) and tallying 249 tackles (165 solos) and 6.5 sacks. As a senior, Hillenmeyer was 1 of 6 Division I-A football National Scholar-Athletes earned First-team All-SEC and First-team Academic All-America honors while leading nation in tackles per game (14.0).

== Professional career ==
=== Green Bay Packers ===
Hillenmeyer was selected by the Green Bay Packers in the fifth round, with the 166th overall, of the 2003 NFL draft. He was waived by the Packers on September 10, 2003.

=== Chicago Bears ===
Hillenmeyer was signed to the practice squad of the Chicago Bears on September 13, 2003. He was promoted to the active roster on October 2, 2003. He spent most of 2003 playing special teams for the Bears, he tied for fifth on Chicago with 12 special teams tackles as a rookie, playing 13 games on special teams. He became the starter at strong side linebacker in 2004 starting 11 games while appearing in all 16 and making 90 tackles and 2.5 sacks. In 2005, he had 71 tackles including 5 TFLs, 1 sack, 1 INT and 2 PBUs while starting 12 of the first 13 games at SLB before a thumb injury sidelined him for the final three regular season games.

On June 30, 2006, the Bears signed Hillenmeyer to a five-year, $13 million contract extension through 2010 that included a $5 million signing bonus. That season, he started 13 games at strongside linebacker, finishing with 68 tackles, 2 TFLs, 1 fumble recovery and a career-high 3 PBUs. In 2007, he played in all 16 games for the second time in his career, starting a career-high 14 contests and had a career-high 101 tackles, and registered 5 quarterback hits, 3 TFLs, 2 PBUs, 1 forced fumble and 1 fumble recovery. In 2008, Hillenmeyer played 13 games, starting six. Along with All-Pro linebackers Brian Urlacher and Lance Briggs, the Bears were thought to have one of the best linebacking corps in the league; the Chicago Sun-Times called Hillenmeyer "underrated". In announcing the defensive starters for a 2006 Monday Night Football game against the St. Louis Rams, Bears teammate Alex Brown nicknamed the linebacker "Triple H Hunter Hillenmeyer".

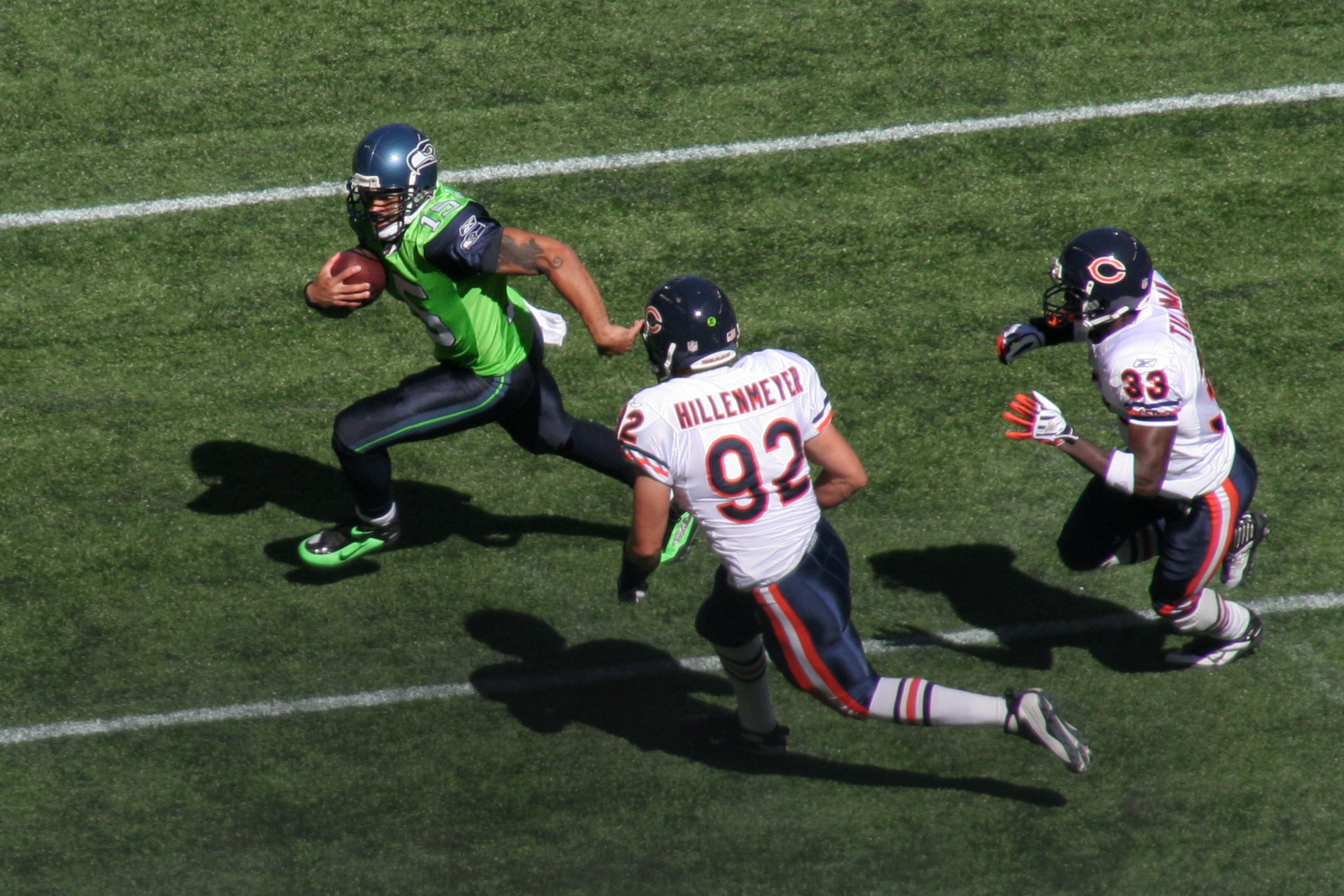
Hillenmeyer pursuing Seneca Wallace in 2009

Hillenmeyer replaced Brian Urlacher at middle linebacker for the Bears after Urlacher's season-ending wrist injury in Week 1 of the 2009 season, making 90 tackles, 2.5 sacks, 1 interception and forcing four fumbles.

On September 14, 2010, Hillenmeyer was placed on the Bears injured reserve list after sustaining a severe concussion in the team's season opener against the Detroit Lions. He was released by the Bears on February 28, 2011.

== NFL career statistics ==
Legend
**Bold**	Career high

=== Regular season ===
Year	Team	Games		Tackles					Interceptions					Fumbles			
Year	Team	GP	GS	Cmb	Solo	Ast	Sck	TFL	Int	Yds	TD	Lng	PD	FF	FR	Yds	TD
2003	CHI	13	0	11	9	2	0.0	0	0	0	0	0	0	1	0	0	0
2004	CHI	**16**	11	86	65	21	**2.5**	**9**	0	0	0	0	2	1	**1**	**13**	0
2005	CHI	13	12	63	45	18	1.0	4	**1**	0	0	0	2	0	0	0	0
2006	CHI	15	13	49	36	13	0.0	3	0	0	0	0	2	0	**1**	0	0
2007	CHI	**16**	**14**	79	**66**	13	0.0	4	0	0	0	0	1	0	**1**	0	0
2008	CHI	13	6	18	14	4	1.0	1	0	0	0	0	2	0	0	0	0
2009	CHI	14	13	**90**	65	**25**	**2.5**	5	**1**	0	0	0	**5**	**4**	**1**	-1	0
2010	CHI	1	0	0	0	0	0.0	0	0	0	0	0	0	0	0	0	0
		101	69	396	300	96	7.0	26	2	0	0	0	14	6	4	12	0

=== Playoffs ===
Year	Team	Games		Tackles					Interceptions					Fumbles			
Year	Team	GP	GS	Cmb	Solo	Ast	Sck	TFL	Int	Yds	TD	Lng	PD	FF	FR	Yds	TD
2005	CHI	1	1	8	**7**	1	0.0	0	0	0	0	0	0	0	0	0	0
2006	CHI	**3**	**2**	**12**	6	**6**	0.0	**1**	0	0	0	0	**1**	0	0	0	0
		4	3	20	13	7	0.0	1	0	0	0	0	1	0	0	0	0

== Personal life ==
Hillenmeyer pursued a part-time MBA program at the Kellogg School of Management at Northwestern University in Evanston, Illinois. His father is a chef and restaurant owner in Tennessee.

He is married to Shannon Floyd, the daughter of former college basketball and NBA coach Tim Floyd. The two were wed in 2008.

In 2013, Hillenmeyer founded a company called OverDog, which allows fans to compete against pro athletes in video games over a mobile app.
