= Chris Harris (safety) =

American football player and coach (born 1982)

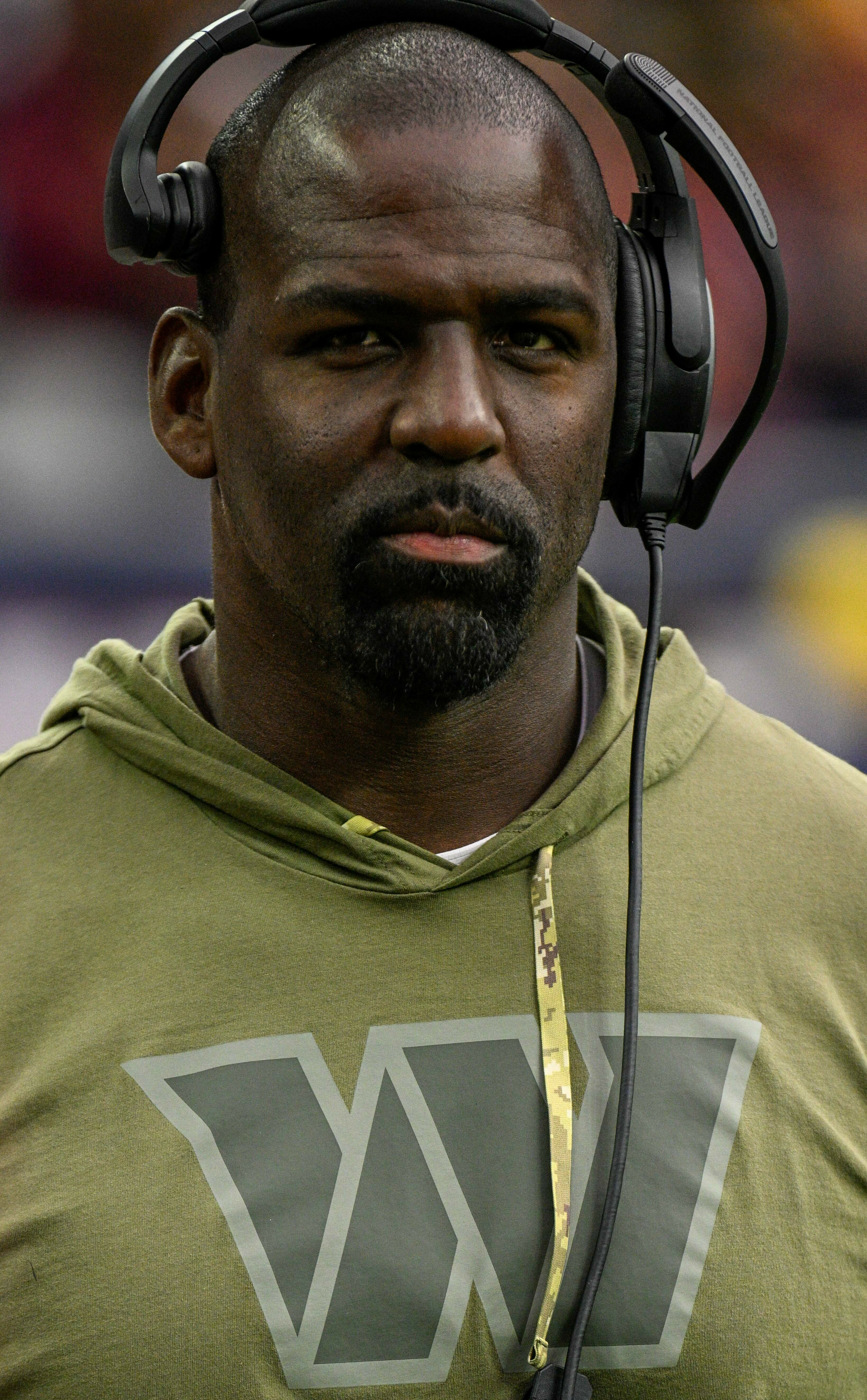
- Harris with the Washington Commanders in 2022

New York Jets
- Title: Defensive backs coach

Personal information
- Born: August 6, 1982 (age 44); Little Rock, Arkansas, U.S.
- Listed height: 6 ft 0 in (1.83 m)
- Listed weight: 211 lb (96 kg)

Career information
- Position: Safety (No. 46, 43)
- High school: J. A. Fair (Little Rock)
- College: Louisiana-Monroe (2001–2004)
- NFL draft: 2005: 6th round, 181st overall pick

Career history

Playing
- Chicago Bears (2005–2006); Carolina Panthers (2007–2009); Chicago Bears (2010–2011); Detroit Lions (2011); Jacksonville Jaguars (2012)

Coaching
- Chicago Bears (2013–2014) Defensive quality control coach; San Diego / Los Angeles Chargers (2016–2019) Assistant defensive backs coach; Washington Football Team / Commanders (2020–2022) Defensive backs coach; Tennessee Titans (2023–2024) Defensive pass game coordinator & cornerbacks coach; New York Jets (2025–present); Defensive backs coach & passing game coordinator (2025–present); Interim defensive coordinator (2025)

Awards and highlights
- Second-team All-Pro (2010); NFL forced fumbles leader (2007); 2× First-team All-Sun Belt (2003, 2004); Second-team All-Sun Belt (2002)

Career NFL statistics
- Total tackles: 439
- Sacks: 1
- Forced fumbles: 14
- Fumble recoveries: 9
- Interceptions: 16
- Stats at Pro Football Reference
- Coaching profile at Pro Football Reference

Chris Harris (born August 6, 1982) is an American professional football coach and former safety who is currently the defensive backs coach and passing game coordinator for the New York Jets of the National Football League (NFL). He played eight seasons in NFL. He was selected by the Chicago Bears in the sixth round of the 2005 NFL draft after playing college football for the University of Louisiana at Monroe.

Harris also played with the Carolina Panthers, Detroit Lions, and Jacksonville Jaguars, and has coached with the Bears, San Diego / Los Angeles Chargers, Washington Commanders, and Tennessee Titans

== College career ==
Harris attended college at Louisiana-Monroe. After redshirting the 2000 season, he was a four-year starter from 2001 to 2004.

== Professional career ==
Pre-draft measurables
Height	Weight	40-yard dash	20-yard shuttle	Three-cone drill	Vertical jump	Broad jump	Bench press
6 ft 0 5/8 in (1.84 m)	212 lb (96 kg)	4.57 s	4.06 s	6.98 s	36.0 in (0.91 m)	10 ft 5 in (3.18 m)	11 reps
All values from Pro Day

=== Chicago Bears (first stint) ===
Harris was selected by the Chicago Bears in the sixth round (181st overall) of the 2005 NFL draft. He won the starting role at free safety early during his rookie season. In the 2006 preseason, Harris made a statement to a fan, Bryan Lange, that if the Bears made the Super Bowl he would give him a ticket. In January, his statement caused a minor controversy when the Bears did in fact qualify for Super Bowl XLI. Lange stood outside of Bears team headquarters holding a sign saying "Chris Harris, you promised." Harris claimed that he was joking and would not be able to fulfill the request due to family ticket obligations. Ticket brokerage firm sitclose.com later gave Lange a ticket, quieting the controversy. Harris intercepted a pass from Colts quarterback Peyton Manning in the first quarter of the game; however, the Bears would go on to lose the game 29–17.

=== Carolina Panthers ===
Harris was traded to the Carolina Panthers on August 2, 2007, for a 2008 5th round draft pick. Harris started 15 games in 2007 finishing with 101 tackles, and also setting a team record as he led the league with eight forced fumbles.

In 2008, the Panthers rewarded Harris with a four-year contract extension. He finished the 2008 season with 70 tackles, 2 forced fumbles, and 1 interception.

=== Chicago Bears (second stint) ===
On April 27, 2010, Harris was dealt back to the Bears in exchange for linebacker Jamar Williams. In his first season back in Chicago, Harris recorded 70 tackles and a career-high five interceptions that he returned for 69 yards. In week 12, he was the first player of the season to intercept a Michael Vick pass as he picked off Vick in Chicago's end zone to help the Bears beat the Eagles 31–26. Following his performance during the 2010 season, Harris received his first All-Pro-selection. On October 27, 2011, Harris was released by the Bears.

=== Detroit Lions ===
The Detroit Lions claimed him off waivers on October 28, 2011.

=== Jacksonville Jaguars ===
Harris was signed by the Jacksonville Jaguars on October 15, 2012. He was later released on November 28.

On January 26, 2013, Harris announced his retirement.

== NFL career statistics ==
Legend
	Led the league
**Bold**	Career high

=== Regular season ===
Year	Team	Games		Tackles					Interceptions					Fumbles			
Year	Team	GP	GS	Cmb	Solo	Ast	Sck	TFL	Int	Yds	TD	Lng	PD	FF	FR	Yds	TD
2005	CHI	14	13	58	48	10	**1.0**	**4**	3	44	0	**44**	**8**	0	2	**49**	0
2006	CHI	11	7	53	44	9	0.0	2	2	19	0	16	5	0	0	0	0
2007	CAR	15	15	**97**	**77**	**20**	0.0	2	1	30	0	30	5	**8**	**3**	2	0
2008	CAR	**16**	**16**	70	60	10	0.0	1	1	16	0	16	3	2	1	3	0
2009	CAR	13	13	60	48	12	0.0	1	3	3	0	3	6	2	1	0	0
2010	CHI	**16**	**16**	70	50	**20**	0.0	1	**5**	**69**	0	39	7	0	2	0	0
2011	CHI	3	3	8	6	2	0.0	0	0	0	0	0	1	1	0	0	0
2011	DET	8	5	21	18	3	0.0	1	1	19	0	19	2	1	0	0	0
2012	JAX	5	0	2	1	1	0.0	0	0	0	0	0	0	0	0	0	0
		101	88	439	352	87	1.0	12	16	200	0	44	37	14	9	54	0

=== Playoffs ===
Year	Team	Games		Tackles					Interceptions					Fumbles			
Year	Team	GP	GS	Cmb	Solo	Ast	Sck	TFL	Int	Yds	TD	Lng	PD	FF	FR	Yds	TD
2005	CHI	1	1	12	10	2	0.0	0	0	0	0	0	0	**1**	0	0	0
2006	CHI	**3**	**3**	**20**	**17**	**3**	0.0	0	**1**	**6**	0	**6**	**1**	**1**	0	0	0
2008	CAR	1	1	10	10	0	0.0	**2**	0	0	0	0	0	0	0	0	0
2010	CHI	2	2	6	5	1	0.0	0	0	0	0	0	0	0	0	0	0
		7	7	48	42	6	0.0	2	1	6	0	6	1	2	0	0	0

== Coaching career ==
=== Chicago Bears ===
On January 28, 2013, Harris was hired by the Bears as a defensive quality control coach. He was not retained by new Bears head coach John Fox in 2015.

=== San Diego / Los Angeles Chargers ===
Harris joined the San Diego Chargers as their assistant defensive backs coach in 2016.

=== Washington Football Team / Commanders ===
Harris joined the Washington Football Team as their defensive backs coach in 2020.

=== Tennessee Titans ===
On January 21, 2023, the Tennessee Titans hired Harris as their defensive pass game coordinator and cornerbacks coach. Following the 2023 season, Harris was retained by new head coach Brian Callahan in the same role. On January 27, 2025, it was announced that Harris and the Titans would be parting ways.

=== New York Jets ===
On January 31, 2025, the New York Jets hired Harris to serve as their defensive backs coach and passing game coordinator. On December 15, Harris was named the interim defensive coordinator following the firing of Steve Wilks.
