= Jim Arthur =

American football coach

Profile
- Positions: Strength and conditioning coach

Personal information
- Born: July 12, 1978 (age 48); Cheshire, Connecticut, U.S.

Career information
- College: Springfield College

Career history
- Buffalo Bills (2002–2004) Strength and conditioning assistant; Chicago Bears (2006–2015) Strength and conditioning assistant; Miami Dolphins (2016–2021) Strength and conditioning assistant; Chicago Bears (2022–2024) Head strength and conditioning coach

Jim Arthur (born July 12, 1978) is an American professional football coach who is the head strength and conditioning coach for the Chicago Bears of the National Football League (NFL).

== Coaching career ==
Arthur began his coaching career as a student assistant at Springfield College. He was an intern coach for the Buffalo Bills, before joining the Chicago Bears as the assistant strength and conditioning coach under Rusty Jones in 2006. Arthur followed offensive coordinator Adam Gase to the Miami Dolphins in 2016. On February 18, 2022, he was named Head Strength and Conditioning Coach of the Chicago Bears.
