= Jeremy Cain =

American football player (born 1980)

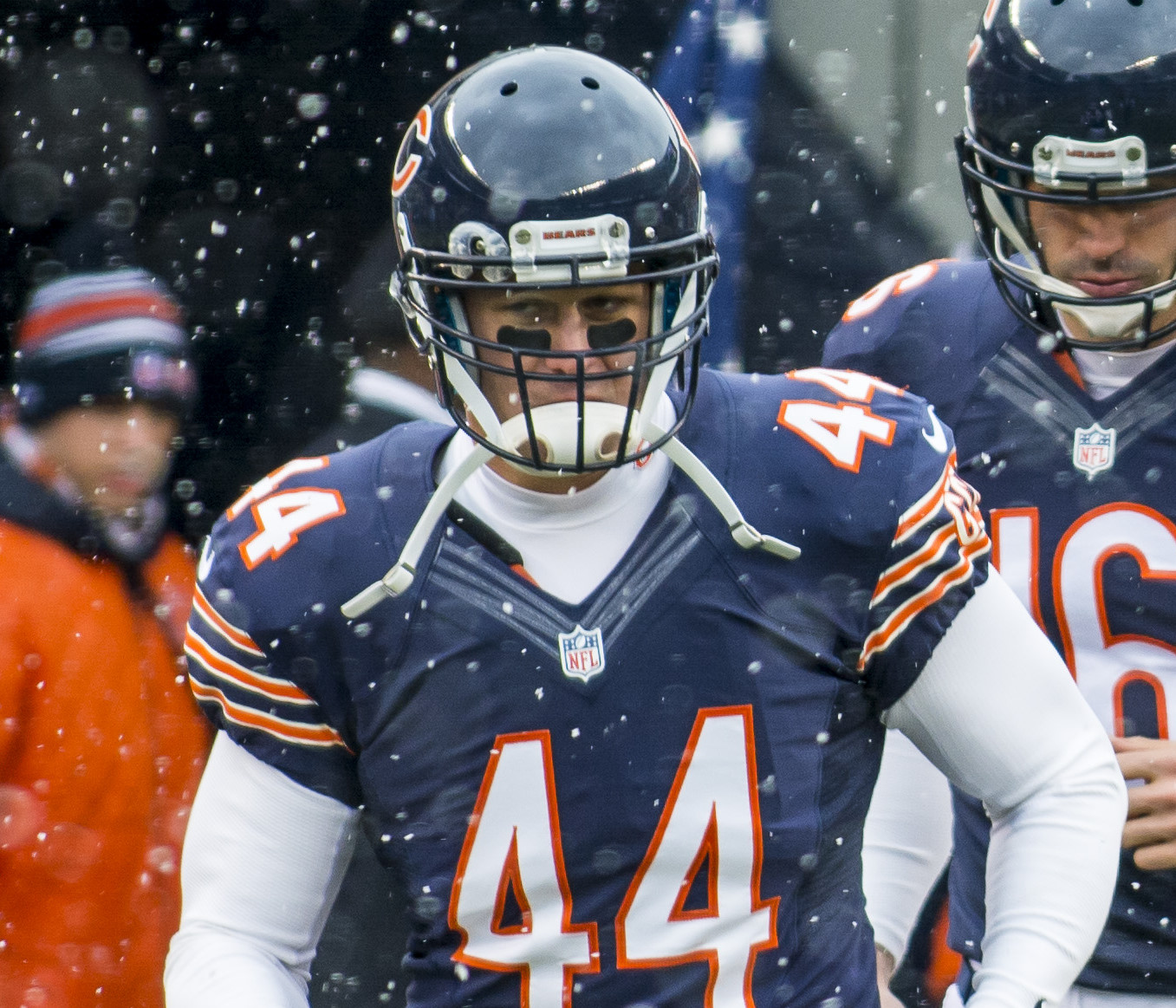
- Cain playing for the Bears in 2014

No. 58, 40, 48, 44
- Position: Long snapper / Linebacker

Personal information
- Born: March 24, 1980 (age 46); Boynton Beach, Florida, U.S.
- Listed height: 6 ft 1 in (1.85 m)
- Listed weight: 245 lb (111 kg)

Career information
- High school: St. Thomas Aquinas (Fort Lauderdale, Florida)
- College: Massachusetts (1999–2003)
- NFL draft: 2004: undrafted

Career history
- Chicago Bears (2004–2005); Amsterdam Admirals (2006); Philadelphia Eagles (2007)*; Tennessee Titans (2007); Washington Redskins (2009)*; Jacksonville Jaguars (2009–2012); Chicago Bears (2013); Tampa Bay Buccaneers (2014)*; Chicago Bears (2014)
- * Offseason or practice squad member only

Career NFL statistics
- Games played: 99
- Total tackles: 56
- Stats at Pro Football Reference

Jeremy Robert Cain (born March 24, 1980) is an American former professional football player who was a long snapper in the National Football League (NFL). He played college football for the UMass Minutemen. and was signed by the Chicago Bears as an undrafted free agent in 2004.

Cain was also a member of the Amsterdam Admirals, Philadelphia Eagles, Tennessee Titans, Washington Redskins, Jacksonville Jaguars and Tampa Bay Buccaneers.

== Early life ==
Cain attended Saint Thomas Aquinas High School (Fort Lauderdale, Florida) In football, as a senior, he garnered first-team All-Broward County honors and All-State honors.

== College career ==
Cain enjoyed a stellar career at UMass, seeing action in all four years of college at linebacker. A three-year starter, Cain was a two-time All-American and was also twice a finalist for the Buck Buchanan Award given annually to the top Defensive player in Division I-AA. He finished his career ranking fifth in school history with 363 tackles.

== Professional career ==
=== Chicago Bears (first stint) ===
Cain was signed by the Bears as an undrafted free agent in 2004. He would spend the 2004 and 2005 seasons between the active roster and the practice squad. Cain saw action in eight games over two years and recorded 10 tackles as a reserve linebacker and one special teams tackle.

=== Amsterdam Admirals ===
In 2006 Cain spent the season with the Amsterdam Admirals of NFL Europe. He would serve as the team's starting linebacker and long snapper recording 38 tackles in helping the Admirals to an appearance in World Bowl XIV.

=== Tennessee Titans ===
For the 2007 season Cain signed as a free agent with the Philadelphia Eagles but was cut by the team in training camp. The following month he was signed by the Tennessee Titans after an injury to the team's long snapper Ken Amato. Cain appeared in nine games as the Titans primary long snapper and also made three special teams tackles.

=== Washington Redskins ===
After spending the 2008 season out of football, Cain was signed by the Washington Redskins in 2009. He was waived on June 11, 2009, prior to training camp.

=== Jacksonville Jaguars ===
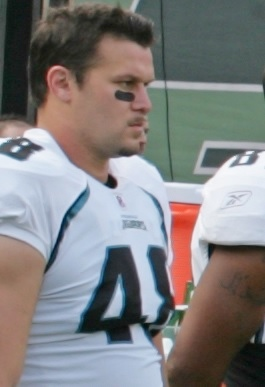
Cain with the Jaguars in 2009.

Cain was claimed off waivers by the Jacksonville Jaguars on June 18, 2009.

Cain outlasted veteran Joe Zelenka for the starting long snapper position in the 2009 training camp. He would serve as the teams long snapper for all 16 games in 2009. Cain also made nine special teams tackles which placed him in second place on the Jaguars all-time single season list for a long snapper.

In 2010 Cain once again played all 16 games at long snapper and also recorded four special teams tackles.

On February 24, 2011, Cain signed a three-year, $2.45 million contract with the Jaguars.

Cain was released by the Jaguars on August 25, 2013.

=== Chicago Bears (second stint) ===
On November 6, 2013, Cain was signed by the Bears after Patrick Mannelly's injury. On November 19, Cain was released.

=== Tampa Bay Buccaneers ===
On March 18, 2014, Cain agreed to a contract with the Tampa Bay Buccaneers. The Buccaneers released Cain on August 24, 2014.

=== Chicago Bears (third stint) ===
On September 1, 2014, Cain was re-signed by the Bears.
