= Jason McKie =

American football player (born 1980)

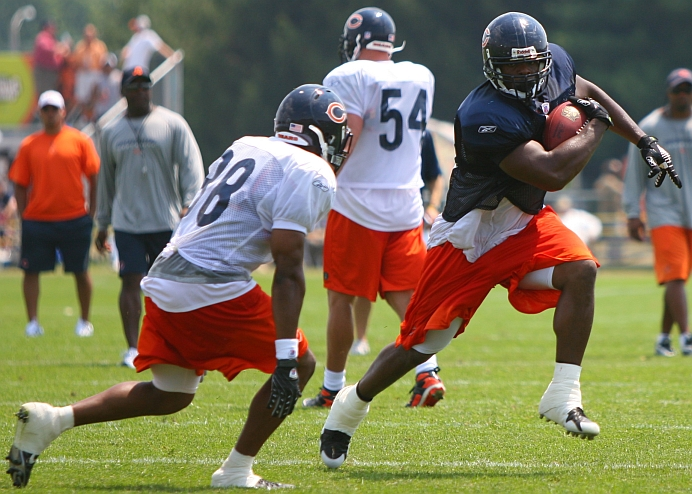
- McKie evades Danieal Manning at the Chicago Bears 2007 Training Camp

No. 35, 37
- Position: Fullback

Personal information
- Born: May 22, 1980 (age 46); Gulf Breeze, Florida, U.S.
- Listed height: 5 ft 11 in (1.80 m)
- Listed weight: 247 lb (112 kg)

Career information
- High school: Gulf Breeze
- College: Temple
- NFL draft: 2002: undrafted

Career history
- Philadelphia Eagles (2002)*; Dallas Cowboys (2002); Chicago Bears (2003–2009); New Orleans Saints (2010)*; Baltimore Ravens (2010)
- * Offseason or practice squad member only

Career NFL statistics
- Rushing yards: 84
- Rushing average: 2.9
- Rushing touchdowns: 3
- Receptions: 68
- Receiving yards: 364
- Receiving touchdowns: 3
- Stats at Pro Football Reference

Jason A. McKie (born May 22, 1980) is an American former professional football player who was a fullback in the National Football League (NFL) for the Philadelphia Eagles, Dallas Cowboys, Chicago Bears and Baltimore Ravens. He played college football for the Temple Owls. He currently serves as the Chicago Bears radio sideline reporter.

== Early life ==
McKie attended Gulf Breeze High School and was a standout in football and weightlifting. As a senior, McKie was named Prep Football Final's Offensive Player of the Year after rushing for 1,281 yards and scoring 16 touchdowns on 183 carries. He rushed for 291 yards and 3 touchdowns against Crestview High School.

He also won the prep wrestling 5-A state championship and was the Florida Class 5A 238 pound class state champion in weightlifting.

== College career ==
McKie accepted a football scholarship from Temple University. As a true freshman, he started 4 out of 10 games, posting 57 carries for 201 yards and 3 touchdowns. As a sophomore, he started 5 out of 11 games, registering 172 yards on 35 carries and 14 receptions for 75 yards and one touchdown.

As a junior, he was named one of the team's captains, registering 36 carries for 93 yards (third on the team) and 20 receptions (fourth on the team) for 128 yards. He also earned Athletic Director's Academic List honors.

As a senior, McKie was the Owls second-leading rusher with 227 yards and two touchdowns on 36 carries, while catching 10 passes for 57 yards. Against Navy, he had career-highs with 11 carries for 120 rushing yards, including an 80-yard run.

He started 26 games at fullback during his four seasons at Temple (1998–2001) where he was a two-time team captain, rushing for 700 yards and eight touchdowns on 169 carries with 44 catches for 460 yards and one touchdown.

== Professional career ==
=== Philadelphia Eagles ===
McKie was signed as an undrafted free agent by the Philadelphia Eagles after the 2002 NFL draft on April 23. He was released on September 1 and signed to the practice squad on September 3. He was released on September 17. He was re-signed to the practice squad on September 26.

=== Dallas Cowboys ===
On December 7, 2002, he was signed by the Dallas Cowboys from the Eagles' practice squad. He was declared inactive in 3 games and only played in the season finale. He was waived on August 17, 2003.

=== Chicago Bears ===
On August 19, 2003, McKie was claimed off waivers by the Chicago Bears. He was released on September 1 and signed to the practice squad. He was promoted to Bears active roster on November 21. On September 2, 2005, he was placed on the reserve-non-football injury list and was activated on November 8.

In 2006, he became the full-time starter at fullback, after Bryan Johnson was placed on the injured reserve list, while helping Thomas Jones rush for 1,210 yards. On November 2, he signed a 5-year contract extension.

In 2008, he helped Matt Forte break the franchise record for most rushing yards by a rookie. On March 16, 2010, he was released after the team hired new offensive coordinator Mike Martz.

=== New Orleans Saints ===
On May 24, 2010, McKie signed a 1-year contract with the New Orleans Saints, to provide depth while Heath Evans returned from a right knee injury. He was cut on July 29. On August 20, the Saints signed McKie to replace injured fullback Marcus Mailei. The Saints terminated his contract on September 4.

=== Baltimore Ravens ===
On November 30, 2010, McKie was signed by the Baltimore Ravens after Le'Ron McClain was injured against the Tampa Bay Buccaneers in Week 12. He was declared inactive in the last 5 games and the playoffs. On January 14, 2011, he was cut before the AFC Divisional playoff game against the Pittsburgh Steelers. He was re-signed on February 10 and released on August 5.

== Coaching career ==
McKie owns a football training facility in Lake Bluff, Illinois, and served as a coaching intern for the FIU Panthers under Ron Turner.

In 2019, he became an assistant coach at Carmel High School under former Bear and head coach Blake Annen. McKie worked as a running backs coach before taking over as interim head coach for the season finale in November when Annen resigned his position. He was named the permanent head coach in December.

== Personal life ==
Mckie's father served for 21 years in the Air Force, and was in the Pentagon at the time of the September 11 attacks. McKie currently lives in Gurnee, Illinois and has three sons Jalen (who plays football for Northern Illinois University), Jason, and Jordan, and a daughter, Journee. He is the first cousin of acrobatic gymnast, Tiffanie "Kee'ra Savage" McKie and third cousin of former Temple Owls head coach and NBA guard Aaron McKie.

McKie has been active in the community throughout his NFL career. In 2008, McKie launched the Jason McKie Foundation of the Institute for Science and Health which focuses on programs in the areas of education and wellness with an emphasis on making an impact in the lives of families of soldiers. The foundation provides educational scholarships to children and spouses affected by a loss or severely injured parent or spouse. Through the foundation, McKie also looks to host various activities with military families, to give back to those who serve their country.
