= Alfonso Marshall =

American football player (born 1981)

No. 22
- Position: Cornerback

Personal information
- Born: January 17, 1981 (age 45); Clewiston, Florida, U.S.
- Listed height: 5 ft 11 in (1.80 m)
- Listed weight: 183 lb (83 kg)

Career information
- High school: Clewiston (FL)
- College: Miami (FL)
- NFL draft: 2004: 7th round, 215th overall pick

Career history
- Chicago Bears (2004–2005)

Awards and highlights
- BCS national champion (2001)
- Stats at Pro Football Reference

Alfonso Lanard Marshall (born January 17, 1981) is an American former professional football cornerback who played for the Chicago Bears of the National Football League (NFL). He was selected with the 14th pick of the seventh round in the 2004 NFL draft, out of the University of Miami.

== Professional career ==
Marshall was selected by the Chicago Bears in the seventh round, with the 215th overall pick, of the 2004 NFL draft. He was waived on September 5, and signed to the team's practice squad on September 7. He was promoted to the active roster on September 21. Marshall played in seven games during the 2004 season, recording four solo tackles and three assisted tackles before being placed on injured reserve on November 15, 2004.

He was placed on the physically unable to perform list on August 30, 2005, and did not appear in any games during the 2005 season. Marshall was waived by the Bears on August 7, 2006.
