= John Tait (American football) =

American football player (born 1975)

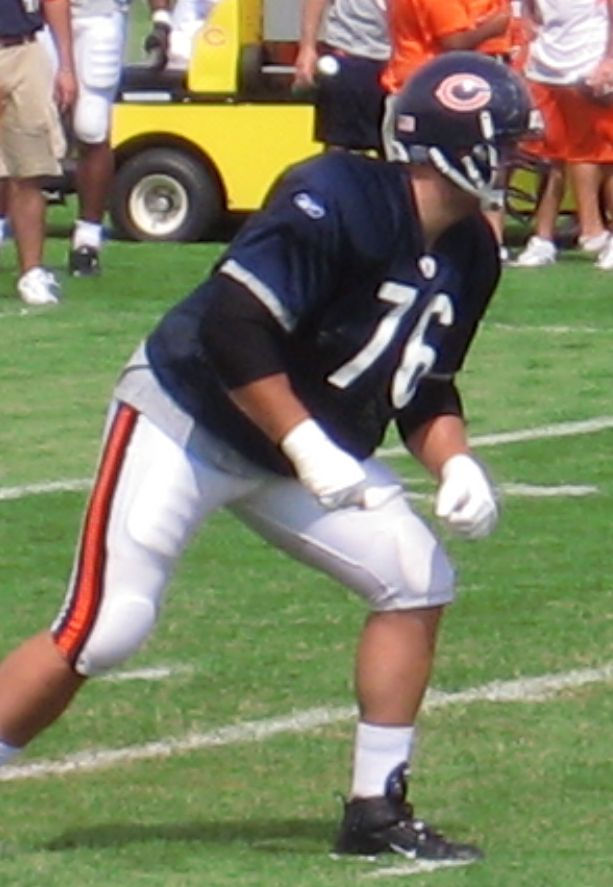
- Tait with the Chicago Bears in 2008

No. 76
- Position: Offensive tackle

Personal information
- Born: January 26, 1975 (age 51); Phoenix, Arizona, U.S.
- Listed height: 6 ft 6 in (1.98 m)
- Listed weight: 312 lb (142 kg)

Career information
- High school: McClintock (Tempe, Arizona)
- College: BYU
- NFL draft: 1999: 1st round, 14th overall pick

Career history
- Kansas City Chiefs (1999–2003); Chicago Bears (2004–2008)

Career NFL statistics
- Games played: 148
- Games started: 139
- Fumble recoveries: 1
- Stats at Pro Football Reference

John Bernard Tait (born January 26, 1975) is an American former professional football player who was an offensive tackle for the Kansas City Chiefs and Chicago Bears of the National Football League (NFL). He played college football for the BYU Cougars and was selected with the 14th overall pick in the 1999 NFL draft by the Kansas City Chiefs. He played for the Chiefs for five years. He also played for the Chicago Bears.

== Early life ==
He is a 1993 graduate of McClintock High School in Tempe, Arizona.

At Brigham Young University, Tait started 38 games during his three-year college career. Tait was an All-America pick his final season and earned first-team All-WAC honors as a sophomore and a junior. Eligible for a fifth year of college action after redshirting as a true freshman in 1993, Tait declared for the draft. He served as the captain for the BYU offense and started all 13 games at left tackle as a junior. He was a first-team All-WAC choice, earned first-team All-America honors from Football News (1998), was named National Offensive Lineman-of-the-Year by The Sports Network and received a freshman All-America nod from The Sporting News.

== Professional career ==
=== Kansas City Chiefs ===
Regarded as the No. 1 offensive tackle available in the 1999 NFL draft, Tait was selected 14th overall by the Chiefs. Sports Illustrated described him as "a pure left tackle" with "no real physical weaknesses".

As a rookie in Kansas City, Tait held out during the negotiation of his first contract. There was a meeting between Tait, his two agents and Chiefs general manager Carl Peterson, wherein Tait and his agents left. Shortly afterward Tait signed an offer sheet for five years.

In a 2002 game against the Cleveland Browns Tait was involved in an unusual play that helped his team win the game 40 to 39. With only a few seconds remaining and trailing by 2 points, Quarterback Trent Green was attempting to throw a Hail Mary pass but was flushed out of the passing pocket, with the game on the line and opposition players having grabbed him Green desperately lobbed the ball backwards where Tait happened to be standing. Tait caught the ball and proceeded to make a 36-yard rush upfield before being forced out of bounds. Ordinarily this would have been the end of the game but Dwayne Rudd had thrown his helmet off in a premature celebration, a defensive penalty that extended the game by one untimed down. Tait's run combined with the penalty yardage enabled Morten Andersen to attempt and make a 30-yard field goal for the win.

At the end of Tait's contract with the Chiefs the team put a transition tag on him. This gave the Chiefs a right of first refusal over an offer from other team but ultimately ended with Tait leaving the team.

=== Chicago Bears ===
Tait signed with the Chicago Bears in 2004. His contract was for six years and $34 million. On February 21, 2009, Tait announced his retirement.
