= Terrence Metcalf =

American football player (born 1978)

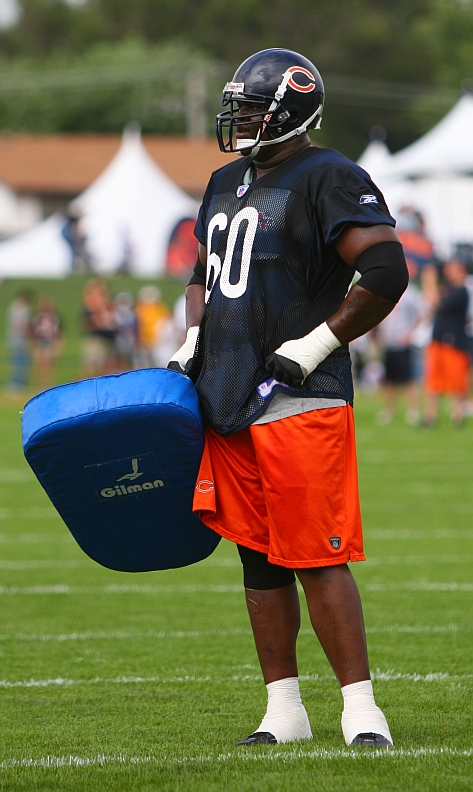
- Metcalf with the Chicago Bears in 2007

No. 60
- Position: Guard

Personal information
- Born: January 28, 1978 (age 48); Clarksdale, Mississippi, U.S.
- Listed height: 6 ft 4 in (1.93 m)
- Listed weight: 310 lb (141 kg)

Career information
- High school: Clarksdale
- College: Ole Miss (1997–2001)
- NFL draft: 2002: 3rd round, 93rd overall pick

Career history

Playing
- Chicago Bears (2002–2008); Detroit Lions (2009)*; New Orleans Saints (2010)*
- * Offseason or practice squad member only

Coaching
- Oxford HS (MS) (2014) Volunteer coach; Oxford HS (MS) (2015) Defensive line coach; Pearl River (2016–2018) Offensive line coach; Pearl River (2019) Assistant head coach, co-offensive coordinator, & offensive line coach; Coahoma (2022) Offensive line coach; Coahoma (2023–2024) Head coach; Ole Miss (2026-Present) Assistant Offensive Coach/Offensive Line Assistant/Personnel Assistant Coach

Awards and highlights
- Consensus All-American (2001); First-team All-SEC (2001); Second-team All-SEC (2000)

Career NFL statistics
- Games played: 84
- Games started: 25
- Stats at Pro Football Reference
- College Football Hall of Fame

Terrence Orlando Metcalf (born January 28, 1978) is an American former professional football player who was a guard for seven seasons in the National Football League (NFL). He played college football for the Ole Miss Rebels, earning consensus All-American honors in 2001. The Chicago Bears chose him in the third round of the 2002 NFL draft. He played for the Bears from 2002 to 2008. Metcalf was inducted into the College Football Hall of Fame in 2025. His son DK Metcalf is an All-Pro wide receiver for the Pittsburgh Steelers.

== Early life ==
Metcalf was born in Clarksdale, Mississippi. He was named a Parade magazine high school All-American following his senior season at Clarksdale High School.

== College career ==
Metcalf received an athletic scholarship to attend the University of Mississippi, where he played for the Ole Miss Rebels football team from 1998 to 2001. He was a first-team All-Southeastern Conference (SEC) selection in 2000 and 2001, received second-team All-American honors in 1999, and was recognized as a consensus first-team All-American in 2001.

== Professional career ==
Pre-draft measurables
Height	Weight	Arm length	Hand span	40-yard dash	Bench press
6 ft 3 1/2 in (1.92 m)	318 lb (144 kg)	33 1/8 in (0.84 m)	9 3/4 in (0.25 m)	5.31 s	28 reps
All values from NFL Draft

The Chicago Bears selected Metcalf in the third round (93rd pick overall) of the 2002 NFL draft, and he played for the Bears from 2002 to 2008. In his seven seasons with the Bears, he appeared in 78 games and started 25 of them.

== Coaching career ==
Metcalf was a coach at Pearl River Community College in Poplarville, Mississippi. He served as an assistant coach at Coahoma Community College in his hometown of Clarksdale, and was promoted to interim head football coach on December 13, 2022. Metcalf was officially named Coahoma's head football coach on December 27, 2022. Metcalf was named an Assistant Offensive Coach/Defensive Line/Personal Assistant for the Ole Miss Rebels on March 19, 2026.

== Personal life ==
Metcalf is the father of Pittsburgh Steelers wide receiver DK Metcalf. He is a member of Phi Beta Sigma fraternity.

== Head coaching record ==
Year	Team	Overall	Conference	Standing	Bowl/playoffs
Coahoma Tigers (Mississippi Association of Community Colleges Conference) (2023–2024)
2023	Coahoma	1–8	0–6	7th (North)	
2024	Coahoma	0–8	0–5	7th (North)	
Coahoma:		1–16	0–11		
Total:		1–16			
