= Lloyd Lee =

American football player and coach (born 1976)

No. 36
- Position: Safety

Personal information
- Born: August 10, 1976 (age 50); Minneapolis, Minnesota, U.S.
- Listed height: 6 ft 1 in (1.85 m)
- Listed weight: 210 lb (95 kg)

Career information
- High school: Jefferson (Bloomington, Minnesota)
- College: Dartmouth
- NFL draft: 1998: undrafted

Career history

Playing
- San Diego Chargers (1998)

Coaching
- Chicago Bears (2004–2005) Defensive quality control; Chicago Bears (2006–2007) Defensive assistant; Chicago Bears (2008) Linebackers; Holy Cross (2017) Outside linebackers

Career NFL statistics
- Games played: 8
- Stats at Pro Football Reference

Lloyd Seyoung Lee (born August 10, 1976) is an American former professional football player and coach in the National Football League (NFL). He played as a safety for the San Diego Chargers.

Lee played college football for the Dartmouth Big Green. He in the NFL for one season with the Chargers. He was later an assistant coach for the Chicago Bears for five seasons, including an appearance in Super Bowl XLI.

== College career ==
After graduating from Bloomington Jefferson High School in Bloomington, Minnesota, Lee played safety from 1994 to 1998 at Dartmouth College.

== Professional career ==
Lee played safety for the San Diego Chargers in 1998.

== Coaching career ==
Lee was a pro scout for the Tampa Bay Buccaneers before being hired by the Chicago Bears on January 23, 2004, as the defensive quality control coach. He has held a number of positions with the Bears most recently as linebackers coach. Lee was the nickelbacks coach for the Bears in 2006 and 2007, before being promoted to linebackers coach on January 16, 2008. He was dismissed from this position in January 2009.

In 2017, Lee was outside linebackers coach for Holy Cross.

== Business career ==
From 2010 to 2016, Lee was part of the McDonald's corporate leadership program. In 2016, Lee was vice president of football operations at USA Football. He has been a financial advisor with Edward Jones Investments based in Fishers, Indiana since 2018.

== Personal life ==
Lee is married with two children.
