= Bobby Gray (American football) =

American football player (born 1978)

No. 25
- Position: Safety

Personal information
- Born: April 30, 1978 (age 48); Houston, Texas, U.S.
- Listed height: 6 ft 0 in (1.83 m)
- Listed weight: 210 lb (95 kg)

Career information
- High school: Aldine (Houston)
- College: Louisiana Tech
- NFL draft: 2002: 5th round, 140th overall pick

Career history
- Chicago Bears (2002–2005)

Career NFL statistics
- Tackles: 89
- Sacks: 1
- Interceptions: 1
- Stats at Pro Football Reference

Bobby Wayne Gray (born April 30, 1978) is an American former professional football player who was a safety in the National Football League (NFL). He was selected by the Chicago Bears in the fifth round of the 2002 NFL draft. He played for the Bears from 2002 to 2004. He played college football for the Louisiana Tech Bulldogs and high school football at Aldine High School in Houston, Texas.
