= Steve Edwards (American football) =

American football player and coach (born 1979)

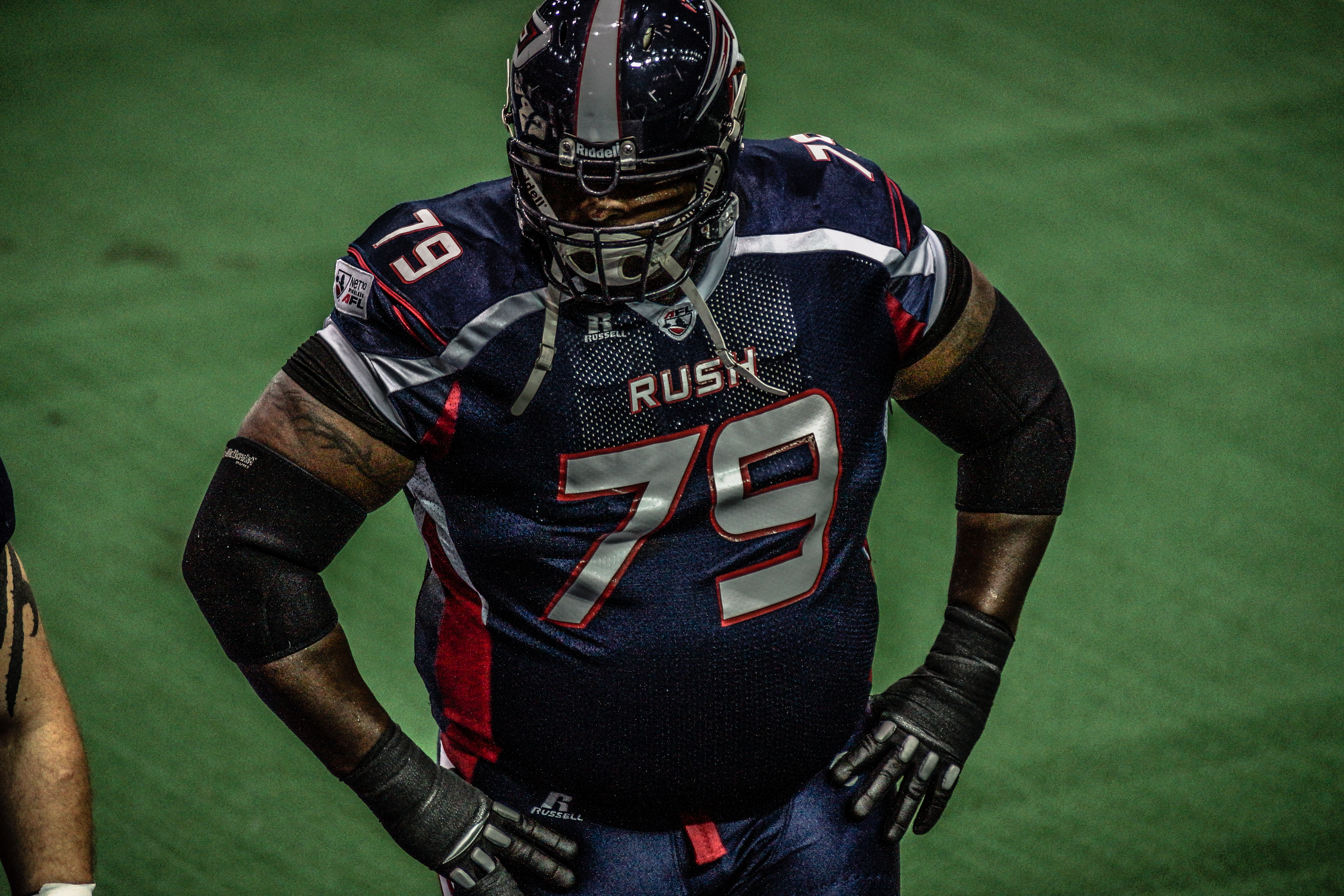
- Edwards with the Chicago Rush in 2013

No. 79, 73, 74
- Position: Offensive lineman

Personal information
- Born: February 20, 1979 (age 47); Chicago, Illinois, U.S.
- Listed height: 6 ft 5 in (1.96 m)
- Listed weight: 333 lb (151 kg)

Career information
- High school: Mount Carmel (Chicago)
- College: UCF
- NFL draft: 2002: undrafted

Career history

Playing
- Philadelphia Eagles (2002)*; Chicago Bears (2002–2005); Minnesota Vikings (2006)*; New York Giants (2006); Baltimore Ravens (2007)*; Philadelphia Soul (2008); Arizona Rattlers (2008); California Redwoods (2009); Arizona Rattlers (2011); Chicago Rush (2013)
- * Offseason or practice squad member only

Coaching
- Orlando Predators (2015–2016) Offensive/defensive line

Career NFL statistics
- Games played: 40
- Games started: 24
- Fumble recoveries: 3
- Stats at Pro Football Reference

Career AFL statistics
- Receptions: 2
- Receiving yards: 13
- Total tackles: 2
- Stats at ArenaFan.com

Steven Edwards (born February 20, 1979) is an American former professional football player who was a guard in the National Football League (NFL). He was signed by the Philadelphia Eagles as an undrafted free agent in 2002. He played college football for the UCF Knights.

Edwards was also a member of the Chicago Bears, Minnesota Vikings, New York Giants, Baltimore Ravens, Philadelphia Soul, Arizona Rattlers, California Redwoods, and Chicago Rush.

== Early life ==
Edwards was born and raised on the southside of Chicago in the Beverly neighborhood. Edwards played grade school ball at St. Barnabas Elementary, went on to play high school football at Mount Carmel High School (Chicago), and was starting tackle on the undefeated 1996 Illinois State Champions team. That team ranked number three in the nation according to USA Today.

== Professional career ==
=== Philadelphia Eagles ===
Edwards signed with the Eagles as an undrafted rookie free agent in the 2002 NFL Draft. Edwards would go on to make the practice squad with the Eagles. Edwards spent several weeks on the Eagles practice squad before signing on to the Chicago Bears active roster.

=== Chicago Bears ===
The Chicago Bears signed Edwards to their active roster from the Eagles practice several weeks into the 2002 season. In 2003 Edwards would start all 16 games and play every snap for the Bears. In 2004 Edwards started 8 games and played 14 games for the Bears. In 2005 Edwards served mostly as a backup for the Bears. During Edward's four years with the Bears he was known for his versatility, playing every position on the offensive line except for center.

=== Baltimore Ravens ===
Edwards was signed as a free agent by the Baltimore Ravens on June 11, 2007. He was placed on injured reserve and then waived with an injury settlement on August 27, 2007.

=== California Redwoods ===
Edwards was signed by the California Redwoods of the United Football League on September 2, 2009.
