= Keith Belton =

American football player (born 1981)

No. 33
- Position: Fullback

Personal information
- Born: June 1, 1981 (age 45); Charlotte, North Carolina, U.S.
- Listed height: 6 ft 0 in (1.83 m)
- Listed weight: 232 lb (105 kg)

Career information
- High school: West Charlotte (NC)
- College: Syracuse
- NFL draft: 2004: undrafted

Career history
- Detroit Lions (2004); Chicago Bears (2004–2006); Denver Broncos (2006–2007)*; Detroit Lions (2007)*; Georgia Force (2008)*
- * Offseason or practice squad member only

Keith Da'Shawn "Thump" Belton (born June 1, 1981) is an American former football fullback. He was originally signed by the Detroit Lions as an undrafted free agent in 2004. He played college football at Syracuse University.

== Post-playing career ==
After his playing career, Belton worked in strength and conditioning and sports performance. He joined the UCLA football staff in March 2021 as director of football performance. In the summer of 2024, Dallas Mavericks general manager Nico Harrison hired Belton as the team's athletic performance director after Belton left UCLA.

In April 2025, ESPN reported that Belton did not hold the NSCA RSCC or CSCS certification specified in the NBA's collective bargaining agreement for individuals newly hired to perform strength-and-conditioning services; ESPN reported that the league had temporarily accepted his existing Collegiate Strength and Conditioning Coaches Association credential. ESPN also reported that a disagreement between Belton and director of health and performance Johann Bilsborough over the treatment of Dereck Lively II's ankle injury led to a heated verbal confrontation that was investigated by the Mavericks' human-resources department. In May 2025, Harrison dismissed Belton amid broader changes to the Mavericks' health and performance staff.
