= Rob Boras =

American football coach (born 1970)

Buffalo Bills
- Title: Tight ends coach & run game coordinator

Personal information
- Born: September 30, 1970 (age 56); Glen Ellyn, Illinois, U.S.

Career information
- High school: Glen Ellyn (IL) Glenbard West
- College: DePauw

Career history
- DePauw (1992–1993) Offensive line coach; Texas (1994–1997); Graduate assistant/offensive line (1994); Tight ends coach (1995); Special assistant to the team (1996); Tight ends/special teams assistant (1997); Benedictine (1998) Head coach; UNLV (1999–2003); Offensive line coach (1999–2000); Offensive coordinator & offensive line coach (2001–2003); Chicago Bears (2004–2009) Tight ends coach; Jacksonville Jaguars (2010–2011) Tight ends coach; St. Louis/Los Angeles Rams (2012–2016); Tight ends coach (2012–2014); Assistant head coach/offense (2015); Offensive coordinator (2016); Buffalo Bills (2017–present); Tight ends coach (2017–2025); Tight ends coach & run game coordinator (2026–present)

Head coaching record
- Regular season: NCAA: 3–7 (.300)
- Coaching profile at Pro Football Reference

Rob Boras (born September 30, 1970) is an American professional football coach who is the tight ends coach and run game coordinator for the Buffalo Bills of the National Football League (NFL). He served as offensive coordinator of the St.Louis/Los Angeles Rams from 2015 to 2016 and as head coach at Benedictine University in 1998, compiling an overall record of three wins and seven losses. During his career, he has also been an assistant coach at DePauw, Texas, UNLV, as well as for the Chicago Bears and Jacksonville Jaguars.

== Coaching career ==
Boras played center from 1988 to 1991 for Division III DePauw University. After his playing career ended, Boras stayed at his alma mater, joining the coaching staff as the offensive line coach. He then moved on to the University of Texas where he served in various coaching positions over four years with the Texas Longhorns football team. After further stints at Benedictine University and UNLV, Boras became the tight ends coach for the Chicago Bears in February 2004. Boras was relieved of his duties with the Chicago Bears in January 2010 along with five other offensive coaches.

In February 2010, Boras was hired by the Jacksonville Jaguars to succeed newly hired Chicago Bears' offensive line coach Mike Tice as tight ends coach.

On December 7, 2015, Boras was promoted to offensive coordinator for the St. Louis Rams following the firing of Frank Cignetti Jr. On February 25, 2016, Rob Boras was named permanent offensive coordinator for the Los Angeles Rams.

On January 17, 2017, Boras was hired by the Buffalo Bills as the team's tight end coach. Following the 2025 season, Boras was retained by new head coach Joe Brady to serve as his tight ends coach. On February 13, 2026, Boras received a promotion, as he was named the Bills' run game coordinator while also continuing his duties as the team's tight ends coach.

== Head coaching record ==
Year	Team	Overall	Conference	Standing	Bowl/playoffs
Benedictine Eagles (Illini-Badger Football Conference) (1998)
1998	Benedictine	3–7	3–4		
Benedictine:		3–7	3–4		
Total:		3–7			
