= Leon Joe =

American football player (born 1981)

No. 59, 53, 45
- Position: Linebacker

Personal information
- Born: October 26, 1981 (age 45); Dayton, Ohio, U.S.
- Listed height: 6 ft 1 in (1.85 m)
- Listed weight: 235 lb (107 kg)

Career information
- High school: Friendly (Fort Washington, Maryland)
- College: Maryland
- NFL draft: 2004: 4th round, 112th overall pick

Career history
- Chicago Bears (2004); Arizona Cardinals (2004); Chicago Bears (2005–2006); Tampa Bay Buccaneers (2007)*; Buffalo Bills (2007); Jacksonville Jaguars (2007); Buffalo Bills (2007); Tampa Bay Buccaneers (2008)*; Detroit Lions (2008)*; Montreal Alouettes (2009); Toronto Argonauts (2010); Edmonton Eskimos (2010)*
- * Offseason or practice squad member only

Career NFL statistics
- Total tackles: 45
- Stats at Pro Football Reference
- Stats at CFL.ca (archive)

Leon Maurice Joe (born October 26, 1981) is an American former professional football player who was a linebacker in the National Football League (NFL) and Canadian Football League (CFL). He was selected by the Chicago Bears in the fourth round of the 2004 NFL draft. He played college football for the Maryland Terrapins.

Over the course of his NFL career, Joe was also a member of the Arizona Cardinals, Buffalo Bills, Jacksonville Jaguars, Tampa Bay Buccaneers, and Detroit Lions. He also spent time in the CFL with the Montreal Alouettes, Toronto Argonauts and Edmonton Eskimos before retiring in 2010.
