= Rusty Jones (American football) =

American football coach (born 1953)

Profile
- Position: Director of sports performance

Personal information
- Born: August 14, 1953 (age 73); Berwick, Maine, U.S.

Career information
- High school: Noble (ME)
- College: Springfield

Career history
- Buffalo Bills (1985–2004) Strength and conditioning coordinator; Chicago Bears (2005–2013) Strength and conditioning coordinator; Indianapolis Colts (2018–2023) Director of sports performance

Rusty Jones (born August 14, 1953) is an American former football coach and strength and conditioning coach in the National Football League (NFL).

== Coaching career ==
Jones' National Football League career began in 1985 with the Buffalo Bills, where he coached for 20 years; head coach Marv Levy called him the team's "secret weapon". He moved to Chicago as their strength and conditioning coordinator on February 3, 2005.

Jones was viewed as an important figure in the development of strength and conditioning training in football, making innovations including individualized workout and diet regimens, and an emphasis on the body mass index and hydration monitoring. In 2007, he was named coach of the year by the Professional Football Strength and Conditioning Coaches Society.

On January 19, 2013, the Bears reported that Jones would retire after 28 years of coaching. In his career, Jones' teams qualified for the playoffs 13 times, and reached the Super Bowl five times; he worked with 43 Pro Bowlers and seven Pro Football Hall of Famers.

In 2016 he received the NFL strength and conditioning Lifetime Achievement award at the NFL Combine.

In 2018, he joined the Indianapolis Colts as their director of sports performance. He retired for a second time in February 2024.
