= Bryan Johnson (fullback) =

American football player (born 1978)

No. 47
- Position: Fullback

Personal information
- Born: January 18, 1978 (age 48); Harbor City, California, U.S.
- Listed height: 6 ft 1 in (1.85 m)
- Listed weight: 242 lb (110 kg)

Career information
- High school: Highland (Pocatello, Idaho)
- College: Boise State
- NFL draft: 2000: undrafted

Career history
- Washington Redskins (2000–2003); Chicago Bears (2004–2006)

Career NFL statistics
- Receptions: 52
- Receiving yards: 384
- Touchdowns: 2
- Stats at Pro Football Reference

Bryan Johnson (born January 18, 1978) is an American former professional football player who was a fullback in the National Football League (NFL). He played college football a linebacker for the Boise State Broncos. He entered the NFL as an undrafted free agent in the 2000 when he signed with the Washington Redskins. In 2004, he was traded to the Chicago Bears as a pending restricted free agent. Johnson attended Highland High School in Pocatello, Idaho.

In Bears training camp in 2006 he tore part of his hamstring and had surgery a few days later. Johnson retired from the NFL in 2007 after being on injured reserve for his last season.
