= Patrick Mannelly =

American football player (born 1975)

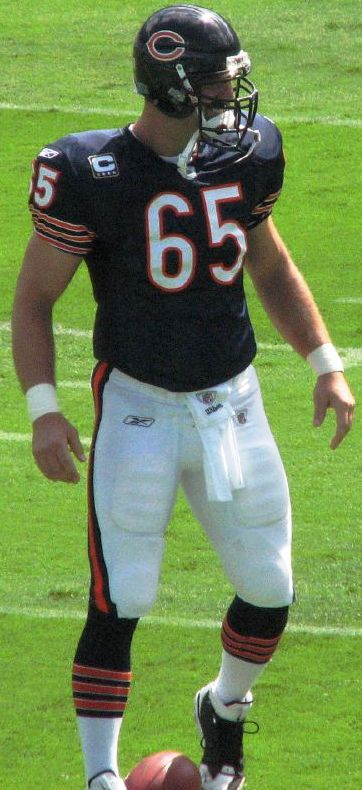
- Mannelly with the Chicago Bears in 2008

No. 65
- Position: Long snapper

Personal information
- Born: April 18, 1975 (age 51); Atlanta, Georgia, U.S.
- Listed height: 6 ft 5 in (1.96 m)
- Listed weight: 265 lb (120 kg)

Career information
- High school: Marist (Brookhaven, Georgia)
- College: Duke (1993–1997)
- NFL draft: 1998: 6th round, 189th overall pick

Career history
- Chicago Bears (1998–2013)

Awards and highlights
- 100 greatest Bears of all-time

Career NFL statistics
- Games played: 245
- Total tackles: 46
- Fumble recoveries: 1
- Stats at Pro Football Reference

Patrick Mannelly (born April 18, 1975) is an American former professional football player who was a long snapper for the Chicago Bears of the National Football League (NFL). He played college football for the Duke Blue Devils and was selected by Chicago in the sixth round of the 1998 NFL draft. Mannelly played with the Bears for 16 years before retiring in 2014.

He is considered the top long snapper in modern-day football, a title given to him by sports columnist Rick Gosselin and special teams NFL agent Kevin Gold.

The Patrick Mannelly Award is presented to the top NCAA Division I Football Bowl Subdivision senior long snapper.

== Early life ==
Mannelly attended Marist School in Atlanta, Georgia, where he was a letterman in football and basketball. In football, he was invited to the Georgia–Florida All-Star game after his senior season. Mannelly graduated from Marist School in 1993.

== College career ==
Mannelly attended Duke University and was a four-year starter at long snapper and a two-year starter on the offensive line. He missed a majority of senior year due to a mysterious hip injury. In Mannelly's final college game he went up against Mel Tucker; 15 years later Tucker would join Mannelly at the Chicago Bears and became the Bears defensive coordinator.

== Professional career ==
The Bears drafted Mannelly in the sixth round of the 1998 NFL draft. Per the Bears records he snapped the ball 2,282 times during his NFL career without a botched snap.

In 2006, kicker Robbie Gould claimed that Mannelly played a pivotal part of his productive season, and praised him in his Pro Bowl acceptance speech. Gould considered him one of the NFL's unsung heroes.

On September 27, 2010, Mannelly broke Steve McMichael's Chicago Bears record for most games played as a Bear, with 192 (the record now stands at 245, at the time of his retirement he was tied for 43rd most in NFL history).

In a 2011 game against the San Diego Chargers, Mannelly ruptured his ACL, and was placed on injured reserve.

In 2012, Mannelly broke the record for most seasons with the Bears with 15. On December 24, 2012, Mannelly signed a one-year deal with the Bears.

Mannelly retired on June 20, 2014, after a 16-year career. Mannelly ended his career with 81 special teams tackles, the third most by a Bear since 1995 (when the statistic was first officially recorded), and the longest tenured player in team history.

"Mannelly was a perfectionist. He turned long-snapping into a science. He was the first to count the rotations of the ball on a short snap so the holder never gets the laces, and he also developed cutting edge drills that are used by most special-teams coaches today."

— Dave Toub, Bears special-teams coach

== Life after football ==
On September 2, 2014, Mannelly debuted with Chicago sports talk radio station 670 The Score as a co-host to Matt Spiegel. Less than a year later, Mannelly left the show citing a lack of interest in covering sports besides football. He will remain on the station as a football analyst.

In 2019, Mannelly partnered with NFL agent Kevin Gold and trainer Chris Rubio to create the Patrick Mannelly Award, given to the best long snapper in college football.

== Personal life ==
Mannelly was born to Jay and Patty Mannelly. His brother, Bernard, played college football for the Notre Dame Fighting Irish. He and Tamara John, the daughter of former Major League Baseball pitcher Tommy John, were married in 1998. The couple has one daughter, Tyler, who was born on Christmas Eve 2005. Mannelly is also a spokesperson for the American Lung Association's Athletes and Asthma program.

Mannelly was a recipient of the Ed Block Courage Award on April 8, 2014.
