= 2007 Chicago Bears season =

NFL team season

- Owner: The McCaskey Family
- General manager: Jerry Angelo
- Head coach: Lovie Smith
- Offensive coordinator: Ron Turner
- Defensive coordinator: Bob Babich
- Home stadium: Soldier Field

Results
- Record: 7–9
- Division place: 4th NFC North
- Playoffs: Did not qualify

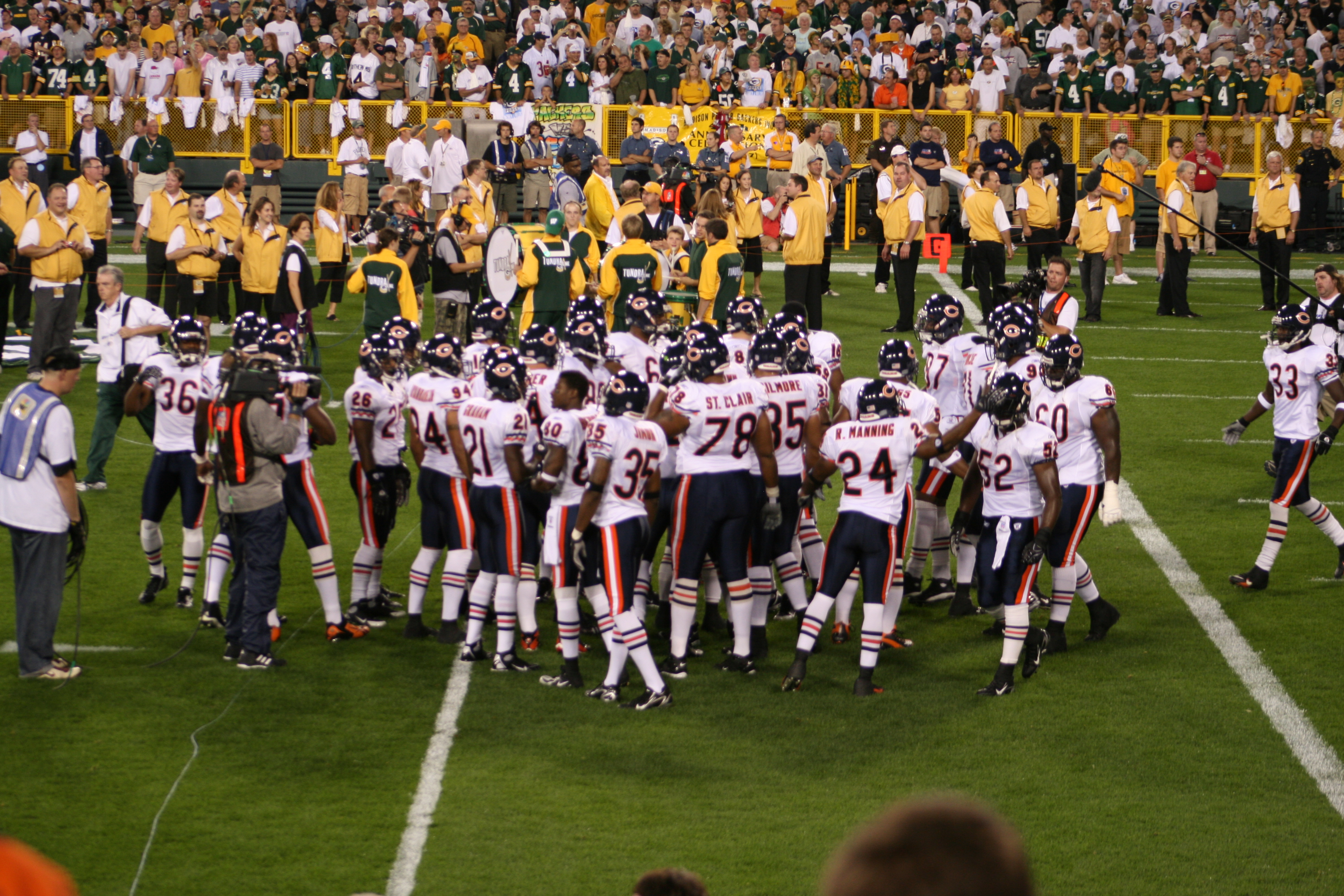
The Bears huddle before their week 5 game against the Green Bay Packers

The 2007 season was the Chicago Bears' 88th season in the National Football League (NFL), and the fourth under head coach Lovie Smith. The season officially began on September 9, 2007, against the San Diego Chargers, and concluded on December 30 against the New Orleans Saints. The Bears entered the 2007 season as the National Football Conference (NFC) Champions and had hopes of returning to the Super Bowl, but instead finished the season with a 7–9 record and missed the playoffs for the first time since 2004. The season marked the most recent time that the Bears swept the Green Bay Packers.

== Offseason ==
=== Roster changes ===
One of the biggest stories in the Bears' off-season was Tank Johnson's jail sentence. In December 2006, Johnson came under increased scrutiny after police entered his house in Gurnee, Illinois, and found several guns and weapon paraphernalia. The situation was further complicated when Johnson's friend, William Posey, was murdered the following evening while defending Johnson at a nightclub. On March 15, 2007, a judge in Skokie, Illinois sentenced Johnson to 120 days in jail and fined him $2,500. He was released from jail on May 13, 2007, due to good behavior. Johnson also faced an additional eight-game suspension from the NFL. The league ultimately suspended Johnson for half of the regular season on June 4. Despite vowing to amend his ways, Johnson was pulled over for speeding in Arizona, and was later given a blood test after an officer suspected he was driving under the influence. The incident prompted the Bears to waive Johnson on June 25. Johnson was replaced by Darwin Walker.

Additionally, controversy ensued between the Bears' management and Lance Briggs. Only weeks after losing Super Bowl XLI, the Bears placed a franchise tag worth nearly 7.2 million dollars on the Pro Bowl-caliber linebacker, keeping him with the team for another year. Briggs became unhappy with the action and voiced his anger on The Mike North Morning Show. He even went as far to claim he no longer wanted to be a member of the Bears, a statement he later reiterated nationally on FoxSports.com. Despite Briggs' remarks, the Bears stated that they planned to keep him with the organization for the 2007 season. The Washington Redskins offered to exchange first-round draft picks with the Bears in exchange for Briggs. Angelo deferred the offer on April 3, but later stated they were interested in negotiating another deal the following day. Briggs came to terms with the Bears on July 25, and accepted the 7.2 million dollar contract.

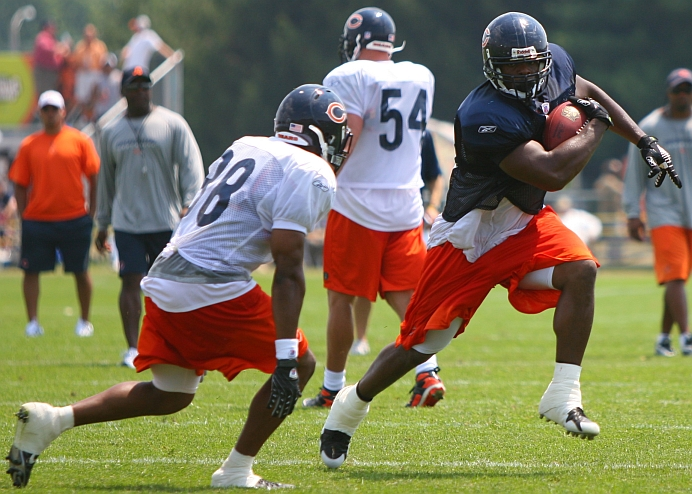
Jason McKie in training camp, July 2, 2007

The team traded running back Thomas Jones to the New York Jets and their second-round (63rd overall) pick for the Jets' second-round (37th overall) pick in the 2007 NFL draft. In addition to the loss of Jones, Todd Johnson, Cameron Worrell, and Justin Gage left the Bears for other teams later. In order to fill the void, the Bears acquired strong safety Adam Archuleta from the Washington Redskins in exchange for their sixth-round draft pick. They also signed former Redskins' kicker Nick Novak to back up Robbie Gould. Defensive tackle Anthony Adams also was signed to further bolster the Bears' defensive line, following the departures of Alfonso Boone and Ian Scott.

The Bears re-signed Ruben Brown, the team's last remaining free agent from the previous season, to a one-year extension for an undisclosed amount of money. Amidst these significant changes, Jerry Angelo, the team's general manager, stated, "I know on the outside it looks like we want to dismantle the team. It has nothing to do with that. We want to keep this the best possible football team that we can. And that's what we're trying to do.", while addressing the media in March. By the end of May, the Bears had lost ten members of their 2006 roster.

The team re-signed Nathan Vasher and Charles Tillman to multi-year contracts. The team traded one of their draft picks to the Buffalo Bills for Darwin Walker, who will replace Tank Johnson. The Bears traded safety Chris Harris to the Carolina Panthers in exchange for an undisclosed draft pick in 2008. Dante Wesley was also traded to the New England Patriots in exchange for a seventh-round pick.

=== Coaching changes ===
The Bears' coaching staff also saw significant changes during the off season. The team did not re-sign defensive coordinator Ron Rivera, whose contract expired at the end of the 2006 season. He was replaced by linebackers coach Bob Babich, who had followed head coach Lovie Smith from the St. Louis Rams. Eventually, five assistant coaches, including quarterbacks coach Wade Wilson, would leave the Bears for other teams. The team worked out a contract extension with Lovie Smith, which extended his contract for four years to 2011. Smith will make a total of $22 million during the course of the deal. Jerry Angelo, the team's general manager, also signed a six-year deal on the same day. The Bears billed Pep Hamilton of the San Francisco 49ers as their new quarterback coach, and Charles London of Duke University as the team's offensive quality control coach.

=== 2007 NFL draft ===
Round	Pick	Player	Position	College
1	31	Greg Olsen	Tight end	Miami
2	62	Dan Bazuin	Defensive end	Central Michigan
3	93	Garrett Wolfe	Running back	Northern Illinois
3	94	Michael Okwo	Linebacker	Stanford
4	130	Josh Beekman	Guard	Boston College
5	167	Kevin Payne	Strong safety	Louisiana-Monroe
5	168	Corey Graham	Cornerback	New Hampshire
7	221	Trumaine McBride	Cornerback	Ole Miss
7	241	Aaron Brant	Offensive tackle	Iowa State

Going into the 2007 NFL draft, the Bears did not reveal which prospects they were interested in, but stated that they entered the draft looking for the "best athlete available". As the loser of the previous Super Bowl, the Bears entered the 2007 NFL draft ostensibly with the thirty-first selection in each of the seven rounds of the draft. However, as a result of trading activity, both before and during the draft, the Bears ended up with nine picks instead of seven, and only five of those nine were in the 31st position.

==== Trade activity ====
The Bears improved their placement in the second round by trading Thomas Jones and their second round pick for the New York Jets' second round pick, which was the fifth pick of the second round. Thus, the Bears then possessed the 31st and 37th overall picks of the draft. However, the Bears then traded this second round pick to San Diego in exchange for the Chargers' 2007 draft picks in the second round (62 overall), third round (93), and fifth round (167), as well as the Chargers' third round pick in the 2008 draft. The Bears also traded away their sixth round pick (186th overall) to the Washington Redskins for Adam Archuleta. Additionally, the Bears acquired the 11th pick of the 7th round (221) by trading Lennie Friedman to the Cleveland Browns. (This pick had earlier been acquired by Cleveland from the San Francisco 49ers.)

==== Actual selections ====
The team used their 31st overall selection to draft Greg Olsen to solidify their tight end position. They later traded their second round, 37th overall selection to the San Diego Chargers, in exchange for the team's second (62), third (93), fifth (167) and next year's third selection. Next, Dan Bazuin was selected to further bolster the Bears' defensive line, while Chicago native Garrett Wolfe was selected in the third round following Thomas Jones' departure. The team spent their other third-round pick to acquire linebacker Michael Okwo. The bears drafted Offensive guard Josh Beekman in the fourth round, and then selected two defensive backs, Kevin Payne and Corey Graham in the fourth round. Lastly, the team drafted offensive tackle Aaron Brant and cornerback Trumaine McBride in the seventh round.

==== Undrafted signees ====
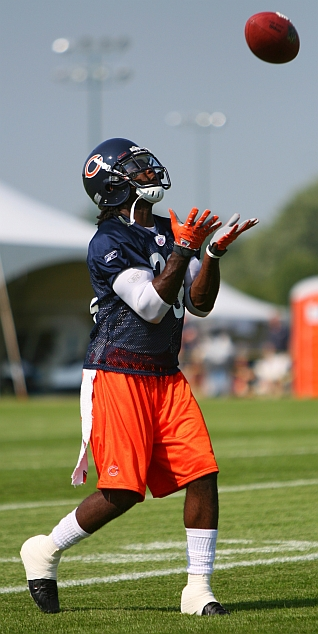
Devin Hester returns a punt during training camp.

Following the Draft, the Bears signed several undrafted free agents. Most notably, the team acquired Chris Leak, who had previously led the Florida Gators to a BCS National Championship title, and Dave Ball, who broke Jerry Rice's Division I-AA record with 58 career touchdowns. The team acquired six other rookie free agents to reinforce other positions. An additional six undrafted rookies were recruited following the team's rookie mini-camp to fill various needs in their team's depth chart. The Bears became the first team in the League to sign all of their draft picks when they came to terms with Dan Bazuin on July 25.

=== Training camp ===
Though the team started conditioning for the upcoming season as early as February, the Bears had scheduled several training camps between the 2007 NFL draft, and the first game of the 2007 preseason. The first mini-camp for first year players was held less than a week after the Draft so that coaches could further evaluate the talent of rookie players. Next, the team had a mandatory mini-camp, which started on May 18, 2007. During the Bears' first mini-camp, Tommie Harris, Dusty Dvoracek, and Mike Brown returned to practice after missing portions of the 2006 season. Additionally, the team converted Devin Hester to wide receiver in hopes of using his play-making ability on offense as well as special teams.

The Bears held training camp from July 27 to August 18 at Olivet Nazarene University.

== Staff ==
2007 Chicago Bears staff
Front office: Owner – Virginia Halas McCaskey; Chairman – Michael McCaskey; President/CEO – Ted Phillips; general manager – Jerry Angelo; Director of pro personnel – Bobby DePaul; Head coaches: Head coach – Lovie Smith; Football operations assistant – Andrew Hayes-Stoker; Offensive coaches: Offensive coordinator – Ron Turner; Quarterbacks – Pep Hamilton; Running backs – Tim Spencer; Wide receivers – Darryl Drake; Tight ends – Rob Boras; Offensive line – Harry Hiestand; Offensive assistant/assistant offensive line – Luke Butkus; Offensive assistant/quality control – Charles London	Defensive coaches: Defensive coordinator – Bob Babich; Defensive line – Brick Haley; Linebackers – Bob Babich; Linebackers – Hardy Nickerson; Defensive backs – Steven Wilks; Assistant defensive backs – Gill Byrd; Defensive assistant – Lloyd Lee; Special teams coaches: Special teams – Dave Toub; Assistant special teams – Kevin O'Dea; Strength and conditioning: Director of physical development – Rusty Jones; Strength and conditioning assistant – Jim Arthur

== Roster ==
2007 Chicago Bears final roster
Quarterbacks: 14 Brian Griese; 8 Rex Grossman; 18 Kyle Orton; Running backs: 37 Jason McKie FB; 29 Adrian Peterson; 39 Lousaka Polite FB; 25 Garrett Wolfe; Wide receivers: 80 Bernard Berrian; 16 Mark Bradley; 81 Rashied Davis KR; 83 Mike Hass; 23 Devin Hester KR/PR; 87 Muhsin Muhammad; 84 Brandon Rideau; Tight ends: 88 Desmond Clark; 89 Fontel Mines; 85 John Gilmore; 82 Greg Olsen	Offensive linemen: 67 Josh Beekman C/G; 63 Roberto Garza G; 57 Olin Kreutz C; 60 Terrence Metcalf G; 69 Fred Miller T; 68 Anthony Oakley C/G; 78 John St. Clair G/T; 76 John Tait T; Defensive linemen: 96 Alex Brown DE; 91 Tommie Harris DT; 71 Israel Idonije DE/DT; 72 Jimmy Kennedy DT; 93 Adewale Ogunleye DE; 70 Babatunde Oshinowo DT; 75 Matt Toeaina DT; 99 Darwin Walker DT	Linebackers: 94 Brendon Ayanbadejo OLB; 55 Lance Briggs OLB; 92 Hunter Hillenmeyer OLB; 58 Darrell McClover OLB; 53 Nick Roach OLB; 54 Brian Urlacher MLB; 52 Jamar Williams OLB; 59 Rod Wilson MLB; Defensive backs: 20 Adam Archuleta SS; 43 Josh Gattis FS; 21 Corey Graham CB; 38 Danieal Manning CB/FS; 24 Ricky Manning CB; 26 Trumaine McBride CB; 36 Brandon McGowan FS/SS; 33 Charles Tillman CB; Special teams: 9 Robbie Gould K; 65 Patrick Mannelly LS; 4 Brad Maynard P	Reserve lists: 95 Anthony Adams DT (IR); 97 Mark Anderson DE (IR); 73 Dan Bazuin DE (IR); 32 Cedric Benson RB (IR); 30 Mike Brown S (IR); 74 Ruben Brown G (IR); 98 Dusty Dvoracek DT (IR); 90 Antonio Garay DT (IR); 35 Ade Jimoh CB (IR); 62 Michael Okwo LB (IR); 44 Kevin Payne S (IR); 48 J. D. Runnels FB (IR); 31 Nathan Vasher CB (IR); Practice squad: 22 Greg Fassitt CB; 79 Chris Frome DE; 66 Mike Jones G; 45 Leonard Peters S; 47 P. J. Pope RB (IR); 64 Tyler Reed G; rookies in italics 53 active, 14 inactive, 5 practice squad

== Preseason ==
The team won their first preseason game against the Houston Texans by a score of 20–19. The game was highlighted by a staunch performance from their three quarterbacks. Rex Grossman completed eight of ten passes for fifty yards, while his back-up, Brian Griese, went six for seven with seventy-two yards and one touchdown and interception. However, third-string quarterback Kyle Orton played an integral part in their victory. Orton, who played nearly two-quarters, completed sixteen of twenty-five passes for 151 yards and a single touchdown. At one point, he had completed twelve consecutive passes. Running back Josh Allen and Orton got the Bears to the Texans' twenty-nine-yard line, where Robbie Gould kicked the game's winning field goal. While the team's defense and offense performed productively, their special teams unit drew skepticism after allowing the Texans to produce several large kick returns. Dave Toub, the Bears' special team coach, blamed the problems on a lack of experience and poor tackling, which have since been properly addressed.

The following week, the Bears faced the Indianapolis Colts for Super Bowl XLI rematch. Although the game took place during prime-time, they would treat the game as if it were any other preseason game. Regardless, the Bears won by a score of 27–24, but not without controversy. Grossman, making his homecoming to Indiana, struggled throughout the night. He fumbled the ball three times (though only turning it over once), and threw an interception. Despite completing the night by completing nine of eleven passes for fifty-nine yards and one rushing touchdown, Grossman's struggles became the focus of the night. Griese, however, threw ten completions on thirteen attempts with one touchdown. The Bears defense was able to record three interceptions, while the special teams unit was able to force a fumble on a return. Return specialists Devin Hester and Danieal Manning also performed productively as kick returners.

The Bears trumped their third opponent, the San Francisco 49ers, by a score of 31–28. Grossman opened the game with a forty-yard pass to Bernard Berrian. He went on to throw two touchdowns, but also threw an interception to Walt Harris, who returned the pick for a touchdown. Benson continued to struggle and only averaged less than a yard on each carry. Nevertheless, the team's first-string defense held the 49ers offense to only six points, and caused two turnovers. The Bears' special team's unit, who lost Hester to an injury in the first quarter, was plagued with fumbles, missed-snaps, inaccurate field goals. The 49ers, who had fallen behind by thirty-one points before the second half, mounted a fifteen-point rally in the fourth quarter. Their second-string quarterback, Trent Dilfer completed nine of twelve passes for two touchdowns, en route to earning a perfect quarterback rating (158.3) for the night.

The team lost their preseason finale to the Cleveland Browns, 19–9. Grossman and most of the team's starters saw limited action during the night. Instead, the team turned to Orton and Chris Leak to lead their offense. The Browns initially struggled but used their special teams unit to score twelve points in the first half. Their second-string rookie quarterback, Brady Quinn allowed the Browns to score their first offensive points of the night. The Bears quarterback, Kyle Orton, lead the game in passing but failed to engineer a touchdown drive. The Bears turned to their fourth-string quarterback, Chris Leak, to finish the game. While Leak threw the Bears' lone passing touchdown of the night, much of the night's praise went to David Ball and Mike Hass, who both made difficult catches. The Bears finished the preseason with a 3–1 record. However, the team's top three draft picks, Greg Olsen, Dan Bazuin, and Michael Okwo sustained injuries. While Banzuin and Okwo were lost for the season, the team was optimistic that Olsen may play in the season's opener.

=== Schedule ===
Week	Date	Opponent	Result	Record	Venue	Recap
1	August 11	at Houston Texans	W 20–19	1–0	Reliant Stadium	Recap
2	August 20	at Indianapolis Colts	W 27–24	2–0	RCA Dome	Recap
3	August 25	San Francisco 49ers	W 31–28	3–0	Soldier Field	Recap
4	August 30	Cleveland Browns	L 9–19	3–1	Soldier Field	Recap

== Regular season ==
=== Schedule ===
Week	Date	Opponent	Result	Record	Venue	Recap
1	September 9	at San Diego Chargers	**L** 3–14	0–1	Qualcomm Stadium	Recap
2	September 16	Kansas City Chiefs	**W** 20–10	1–1	Soldier Field	Recap
3	September 23	Dallas Cowboys	**L** 10–34	1–2	Soldier Field	Recap
4	September 30	at **Detroit Lions**	**L** 27–37	1–3	Ford Field	Recap
5	October 7	at **Green Bay Packers**	**W** 27–20	2–3	Lambeau Field	Recap
6	October 14	**Minnesota Vikings**	**L** 31–34	2–4	Soldier Field	Recap
7	October 21	at Philadelphia Eagles	**W** 19–16	3–4	Lincoln Financial Field	Recap
8	October 28	**Detroit Lions**	**L** 7–16	3–5	Soldier Field	Recap
9	Bye					
10	November 11	at Oakland Raiders	**W** 17–6	4–5	McAfee Coliseum	Recap
11	November 18	at Seattle Seahawks	**L** 23–30	4–6	Qwest Field	Recap
12	November 25	Denver Broncos	**W** 37–34 (OT)	5–6	Soldier Field	Recap
13	December 2	New York Giants	**L** 16–21	5–7	Soldier Field	Recap
14	December 6	at Washington Redskins	**L** 16–24	5–8	FedExField	Recap
15	December 17	at **Minnesota Vikings**	**L** 13–20	5–9	Hubert H. Humphrey Metrodome	Recap
16	December 23	**Green Bay Packers**	**W** 35–7	6–9	Soldier Field	Recap
17	December 30	New Orleans Saints	**W** 33–25	7–9	Soldier Field	Recap
Notes: * Intra-division opponents are in **bold** text. Legend: # Games played with navy uniforms. # Games played with white uniforms. # Games played with alternate orange uniforms. – Light green background indicates a victory. – Light red background indicates a loss.

=== Standings ===
NFC North
	W	L	T	PCT	DIV	CONF	PF	PA	STK
^{(2)} Green Bay Packers	13	3	0	.813	4–2	9–3	435	291	W1
Minnesota Vikings	8	8	0	.500	3–3	6–6	365	311	L2
Detroit Lions	7	9	0	.438	3–3	4–8	346	444	L1
Chicago Bears	7	9	0	.438	2–4	4–8	334	348	W2

== Regular season week-by-week results ==
=== Week 1: at San Diego Chargers ===
Quarter	1	2	3	4	Total
Bears	0	3	0	0	3
Chargers	0	0	7	7	14

at Qualcomm Stadium, San Diego, California

- Game time: 4:15 pm EDT/3:15 pm CDT
- Game weather: 73 °F (23 °C)
- Game attendance: 67,837
- Referee: Peter Morelli
- TV announcers (Fox): Joe Buck (play-by-play) and Troy Aikman (color commentator)

==== Game summary ====
The Bears traveled to San Diego's Qualcomm Stadium to start the 2007 season. They initially succeeded at containing LaDainian Tomlinson, the league's reigning MVP, but received little support from Rex Grossman and Cedric Benson. The Chargers drove into Bears' territory on their second drive, but came up empty after Alex Brown blocked a thirty-three-yard field goal. Mike Brown thwarted another Chargers' drive by intercepting Philip Rivers, which was eventually followed by a twenty-seven-yard field goal. However, Grossman drove the team into field goal position, only to throw an interception (the result of a miscue between him and Bernard Berrian) deep within Chargers' territory.

However, the Bears blew their shutout in the third quarter. After a punt return mishap, the Chargers capitalized on great field position and drove into Bears' territory. Tomlinson threw a touchdown pass to Antonio Gates to cap off the drive. On the Bears' following drive, Adrian Peterson fumbled a carry, which eventually allowed Tomlinson to score a rushing touchdown. The Bears failed to cover Antonio Gates, who collected 107 yards for the afternoon. In addition to the loss, the Bears were forced to cope with the season-ending injuries to Mike Brown and Dusty Dvoracek.

==== Scoring summary ====
Q2 – CHI – 14:13 – Robbie Gould 27-yard FG (CHI 3–0)

Q3 – SD – 0:45 – 17-yard TD pass from LaDainian Tomlinson to Antonio Gates (Nate Kaeding kick) (SD 7–3)

Q4 – SD – 9:09 – LaDainian Tomlinson 7-yard TD run (Kaeding kick) (SD 14–3)

=== Week 2: vs. Kansas City Chiefs ===
Quarter	1	2	3	4	Total
Chiefs	0	7	3	0	10
Bears	0	17	3	0	20

at Soldier Field, Chicago, Illinois

- Game time: 4:15 pm EDT/3:15 pm CDT
- Game weather: 70 °F (21 °C) (clear skies)
- Game attendance: 62,095
- Referee: Mike Carey
- TV announcers (CBS): Jim Nantz (play-by-play) and Phil Simms (color commentator)

==== Game summary ====
After their season-opening loss to the Chargers, the Bears rebounded by winning their home opener against the Kansas City Chiefs. Bernard Berrian fumbled on the team's opening drive, but a staunch defensive effort held the Chiefs at bay, and eventually allowed the Bears to engineer a successful drive. John St. Clair, a reserve offensive tackle, scored the Bears' first offensive touchdown of the season from a one-yard pass from Rex Grossman. The team forced the Chiefs to punt on their next drive, which was returned for a touchdown by Devin Hester.The Chiefs scored their first points of the game after Damon Huard threw a sixteen-yard touchdown pass to Dwayne Bowe.

During halftime, the Bears received the Pro Team Community Award for their charity efforts. The Bears' defense held the Chiefs to only three more points, after forcing pivotal turnovers in two red zone situations and also a blocked field goal attempt. Pro Bowlers Brian Urlacher, Lance Briggs, and Tommie Harris each recorded sacks, and forced Larry Johnson and Huard to leave the game with injuries. Cedric Benson recorded his first one hundred-yard rushing game. With 20–10 win, the Bears advanced to 1–1 record.

==== Scoring summary ====
Q2 – CHI – 10:29 – 2-yard TD pass from Rex Grossman to John St. Clair (Robbie Gould kick) (CHI 7–0)

Q2 – CHI – 9:33 – Devin Hester 73-yard punt return TD (Gould kick) (CHI 14–0)

Q2 – CHI – 2:30 – Robbie Gould 47-yard FG (CHI 17–0)

Q2 – KC – 1:24 – 16-yard TD pass from Damon Huard to Dwayne Bowe (Dave Rayner kick) (CHI 17–7)

Q3 – CHI – 8:36 – Robbie Gould 38-yard FG (CHI 20–7)

Q3 – KC – 3:12 – Dave Rayner 45-yard FG (CHI 20–10)

=== Week 3: vs. Dallas Cowboys ===
Quarter	1	2	3	4	Total
Cowboys	0	3	14	17	34
Bears	3	0	7	0	10

at Soldier Field, Chicago, Illinois

- Game time: 8:15 pm EDT/7:15 pm CDT
- Game weather: 79 °F (26 °C) (clear)
- Game attendance: 62,099
- Referee: Ron Winter
- TV announcers (NBC): Al Michaels (play-by-play) and John Madden (color commentator)

==== Game summary ====
The Bears returned home to play a Sunday night match with the Dallas Cowboys. The game was close early as the Bears' Robbie Gould and the Cowboys' Nick Folk each hit field goals to make it a 3–3 tie at halftime. The Cowboys took the opening drive of the third quarter and ended it with a Tony Romo to Jason Witten touchdown pass. The Bears responded on the ensuing drive with a Cedric Benson goal line plunge. The Cowboys struck again before the end of the third quarter, Romo connecting on his second touchdown pass, this time to running back Marion Barber. Folk converted a 44-yard field goal early in the fourth quarter, and on the next play from scrimmage, Bears quarterback Rex Grossman threw an interception to Cowboys cornerback Anthony Henry, who ran it back for the score. With the lead in hand, the Cowboys proceeded to kill the clock, which they did effectively with Barber, who capped the scoring with a one-yard touchdown run. Barber ended the night with over 100 yards rushing, and Cowboys wide receiver Terrell Owens caught eight passes for 145 yards. The Cowboys improved to 3–0, while the Bears dropped to 1–2.

==== Scoring summary ====
Q1 – CHI – 3:09 – Robbie Gould 20-yard FG (CHI 3–0)

Q2 – DAL – 8:49 – Nick Folk 30-yard FG (3–3)

Q3 – DAL – 10:14 – 3-yard TD pass from Tony Romo to Jason Witten (Folk kick) (DAL 10–3)

Q3 – CHI – 7:14 – Cedric Benson 1-yard TD run (Gould kick) (10–10)

Q3 – DAL – 1:18 – 10-yard TD pass from Tony Romo to Marion Barber (Folk kick) (DAL 17–10)

Q4 – DAL – 12:10 – Nick Folk 44-yard FG (DAL 20–10)

Q4 – DAL – 11:49 – Anthony Henry 28-yard interception return TD (Folk kick) (DAL 27–10)

Q4 – DAL – 3:10 – Marion Barber 1-yard TD run (Folk kick) (DAL 34–10)

=== Week 4: at Detroit Lions ===
Quarter	1	2	3	4	Total
Bears	0	7	6	14	27
Lions	3	0	0	34	37

at Ford Field, Detroit, Michigan

- Game time: 1:00 pm EDT/12:00 pm CDT
- Game weather: 68 °F (20 °C) (Game was played inside domed stadium)
- Game attendance: 60,811
- Referee: Bill Carollo
- TV announcers (Fox): Dick Stockton (play-by-play) and Brian Baldinger (color commentator)

==== Game summary ====
Following the aftermath of the team's loss to Dallas, the Bears turned to Brian Griese to replace Rex Grossman. The change came in an attempt to protect the ball, and reduce turnovers. Nonetheless, the turnovers continued to haunt the team en route to a 37–27 loss against the Detroit Lions. The Lions took a first-quarter lead by blocking a Robbie Gould field-goal attempt, and then using the field position to score a field goal. The Bears' offense struggled to move the ball in the first quarter, and but began to pick up momentum in the second quarter. Griese threw a fifteen-yard touchdown to Muhsin Muhammad, but also threw two interceptions in two red zone visits.

Jon Kitna and the Lions' top-tier passing offense exploited the Bears' injury-depleted secondary. He threw two touchdowns in the fourth quarter, to keep the Bears four points behind the Lions. Griese threw an interception to Keith Smith, who returned it for a touchdown. However, Devin Hester responded by returning the ensuing kickoff for a touchdown. The Lions established their running game later, and allowed Kevin Jones to score a rushing touchdown, sending the Lions up by ten again. Griese led the Bears downfield on the subsequent drive. After several unusual penalties and mishaps, the Griese threw a touchdown to Desmond Clark. Now trailing by three points, Gould attempted by an onside kick, but it was recovered and returned by Casey FitzSimmons, sealing the Bears' loss. The 34 points allowed in the fourth quarter by the Bears are the most in NFL history.

Griese completed thirty-four of fifty-two passes for 286 yards, two touchdowns, and three interceptions in his first start as a Bear. The team's running game mustered a combined total of sixty-nine yards, ousted by the Lions' ninety-five yards. Both defenses unleashed equal punishment on their opposing quarterbacks, combining for a total of twelve quarterback sacks. The Lions' victory snapped their four-game losing streak against the Bears.

==== Scoring summary ====
Q1 – DET – 10:05 – Jason Hanson 49-yard FG (DET 3–0)

Q2 – CHI – 4:16 – 15-yard TD pass from Brian Griese to Muhsin Muhammad (Robbie Gould kick) (CHI 7–3)

Q3 – CHI – 5:08 – Robbie Gould 49-yard FG (CHI 10–3)

Q3 – CHI – 0:49 – Robbie Gould 41-yard FG (CHI 13–3)

Q4 – DET – 14:56 – 4-yard TD pass from Jon Kitna to Shaun McDonald (Hanson kick) (CHI 13–10)

Q4 – DET – 13:14 – Keith Smith 64-yard interception return TD (Hanson kick) (DET 17–13)

Q4 – CHI – 12:57 – Devin Hester 97-yard kickoff return TD (Gould kick) (CHI 20–17)

Q4 – DET – 10:06 – 15-yard TD pass from Jon Kitna to Troy Walters (Hanson kick) (DET 24–20)

Q4 – DET – 3:34 – Kevin Jones 5-yard TD run (kick failed) (DET 30–20)

Q4 – CHI – 0:52 – 1-yard TD pass from Brian Griese to Desmond Clark (Gould kick) (DET 30–27)

Q4 – DET – 0:45 – Casey FitzSimmons 41-yard kickoff return TD (Hanson kick) (DET 37–27)

=== Week 5: at Green Bay Packers ===
Quarter	1	2	3	4	Total
Bears	0	7	10	10	27
Packers	7	10	3	0	20

at Lambeau Field, Green Bay, Wisconsin

- Game time: 8:15 pm EDT/7:15 pm CDT
- Game weather: 79 °F (26 °C) (Cloudy)
- Game attendance: 70,904
- Referee: Larry Nemmers
- TV announcers (NBC): Al Michaels (play-by-play), John Madden (color commentator), and Andrea Kremer (sideline reporter)

==== Game summary ====
The Bears played the Green Bay Packers, their longtime rivals, during week five. The game was a must-win situation for the Bears, who needed a win to preserve any chance of winning the division. The Packers entered the game with a 4–0 record, but suffered their first loss of the season at the hands of a staunch Bears defense. The Packers took a quick lead as DeShawn Wynn rushed for over sixty yards and scored a touchdown on the team's opening drive. Cedric Benson responded by scoring a rushing touchdown, but the Packers broke the tie when Brett Favre threw a touchdown pass to Greg Jennings.

The Packers' offense drove into Bears territory several times during the second quarter, but Charles Tillman forced two fumbles. The two turnovers allowed the Bears to hold the Packers at bay, and keep hold their deficit to ten points. However, Brian Urlacher provided the game's biggest turnover, when he intercepted Favre at the Packers' fifteen-yard line. The turnover allowed Brian Griese to throw a touchdown to Greg Olsen. Later, Charles Woodson fumbled while returning a punt, which allowed Robbie Gould to kick a game-tying field goal. The Bears defense prevented the Packers from scoring again. With two minutes left on the game clock, the Bears offense seemingly moved the ball in hopes of setting up a Gould field goal. However, Griese threw a play-action touchdown pass to Desmond Clark, and gave the Bears a seven-point lead.

Favre tried to lead the Packers down field again, but threw an interception to rookie Brandon McGowan in the end zone. The pick sealed a Bears victory, allowing the team to progress to 2–3. Al Michaels named Tillman as the 'Horse Trailer Player of the Game' for forcing two pivotal fumbles.

==== Scoring summary ====
Q1 – GB – 11:01 – DeShawn Wynn 2-yard TD run (Mason Crosby kick) (GB 7–0)

Q2 – CHI – 7:52 – Cedric Benson 10-yard TD run (Robbie Gould kick) (7–7)

Q2 – GB – 4:55 – 41-yard TD pass from Brett Favre to Greg Jennings (Crosby kick) (GB 14–7)

Q2 – GB – 0:01 – Mason Crosby 37-yard FG (GB 17–7)

Q3 – CHI – 12:03 – Robbie Gould 44-yard FG (GB 17–10)

Q3 – GB – 9:02 – Mason Crosby 37-yard FG (GB 20–10)

Q3 – CHI – 4:19 – 19-yard TD pass from Brian Griese to Greg Olsen (Gould kick) (GB 20–17)

Q4 – CHI – 14:13 – Robbie Gould 36-yard FG (20–20)

Q4 – CHI – 2:05 – 34-yard TD pass from Brian Griese to Desmond Clark (Gould kick) (CHI 27–20)

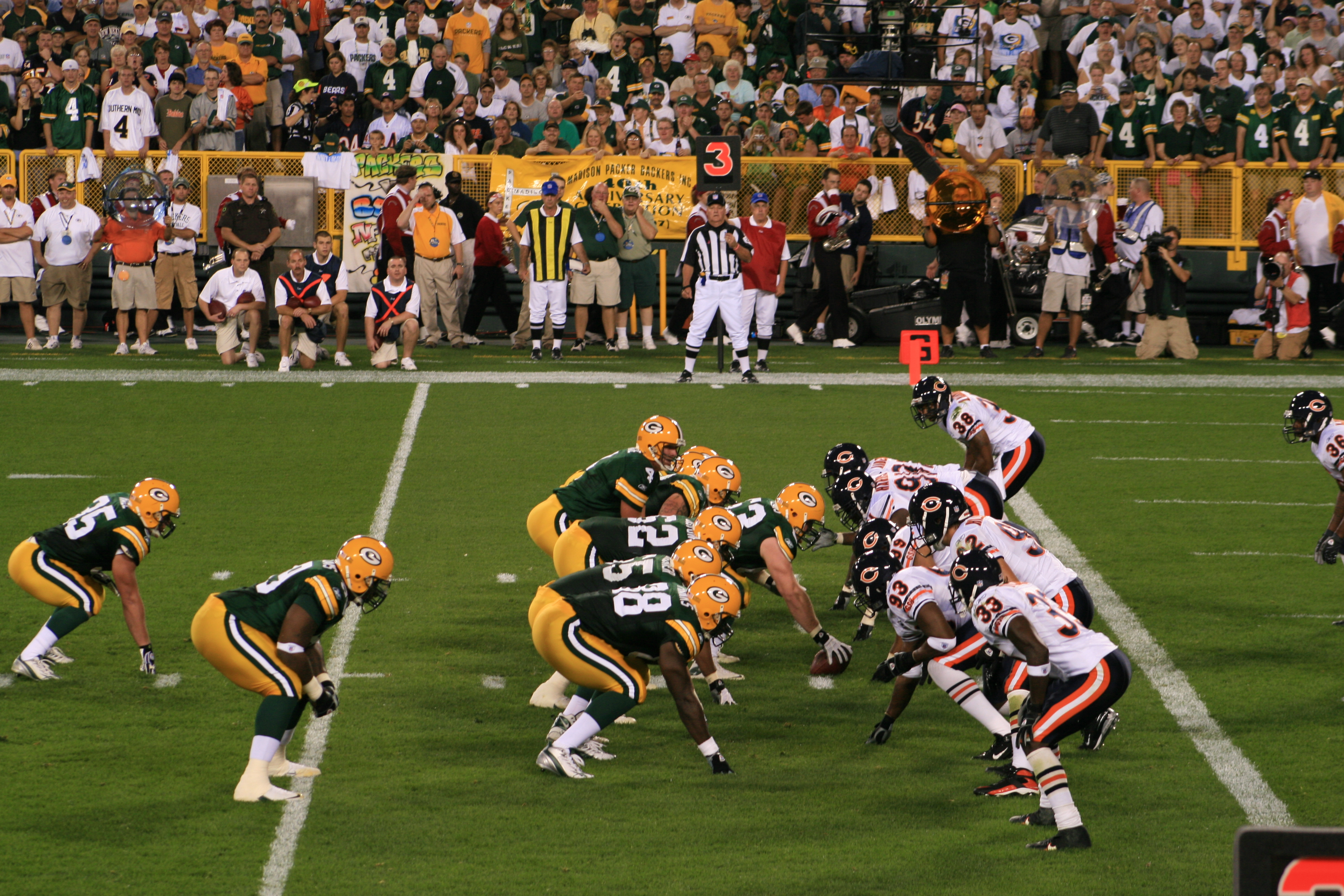
The Bears defense take on Packers quarterback Brett Favre

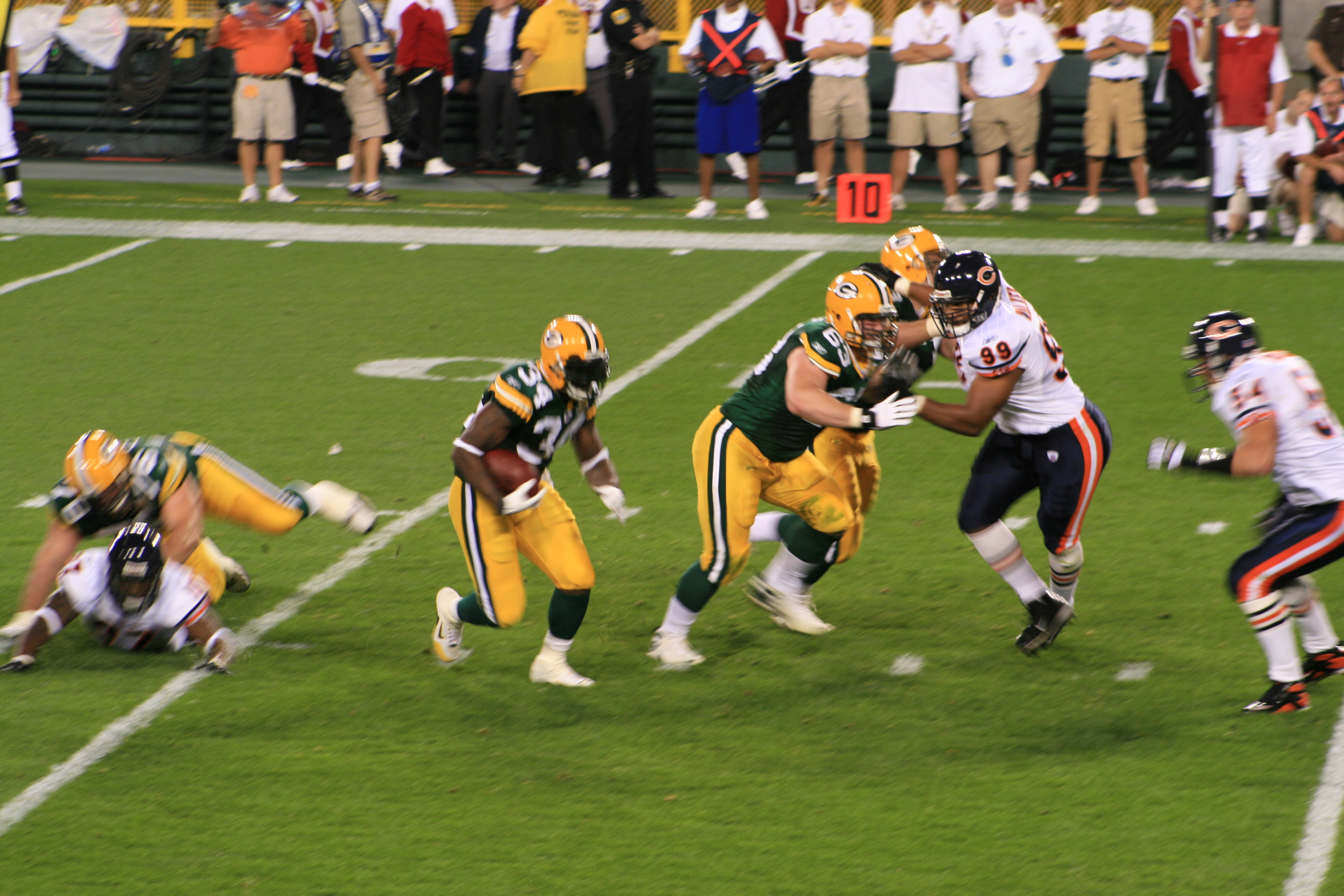
Chicago faces a rush by Vernand Morency

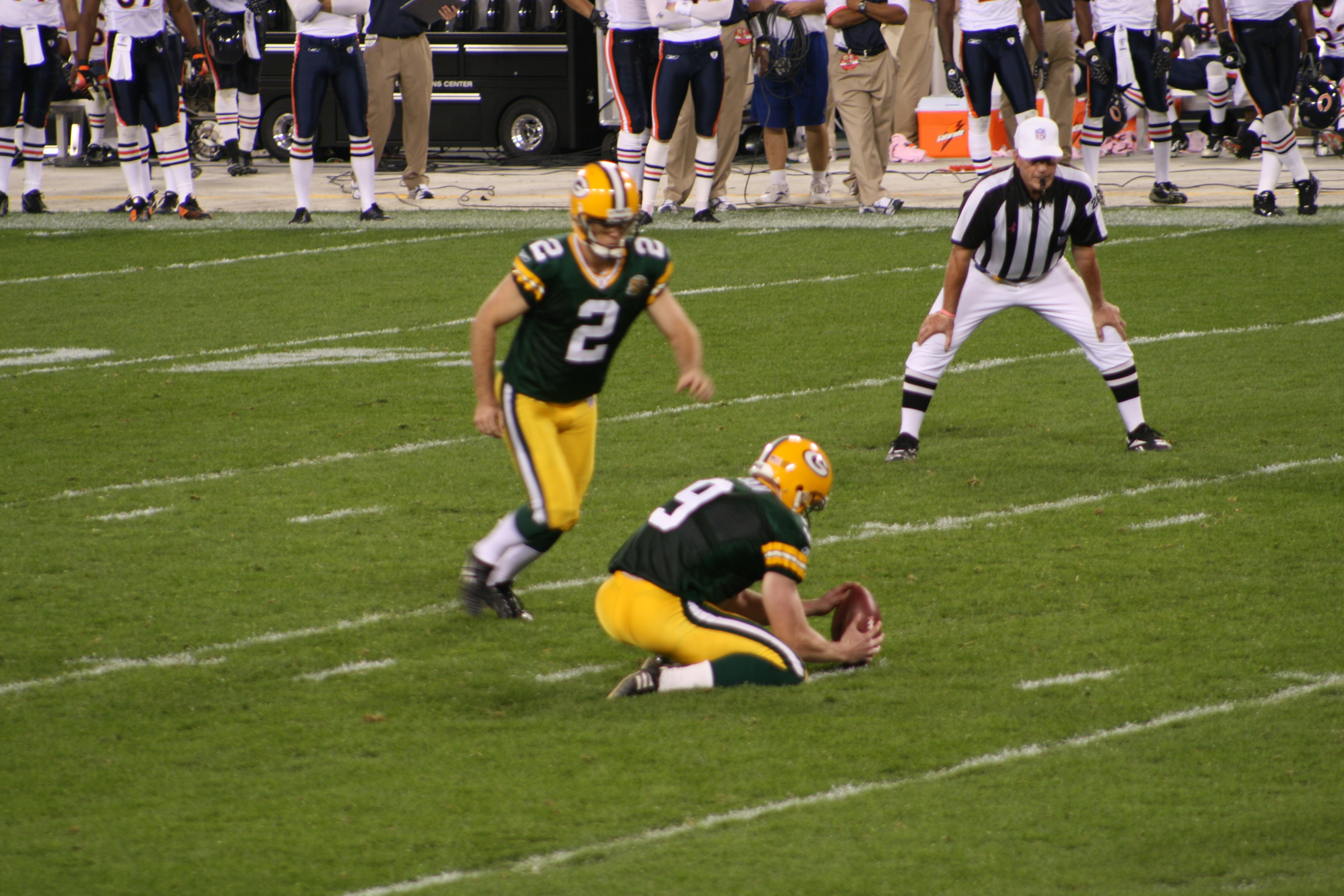
Mason Crosby kicks a field goal, held by Jon Ryan

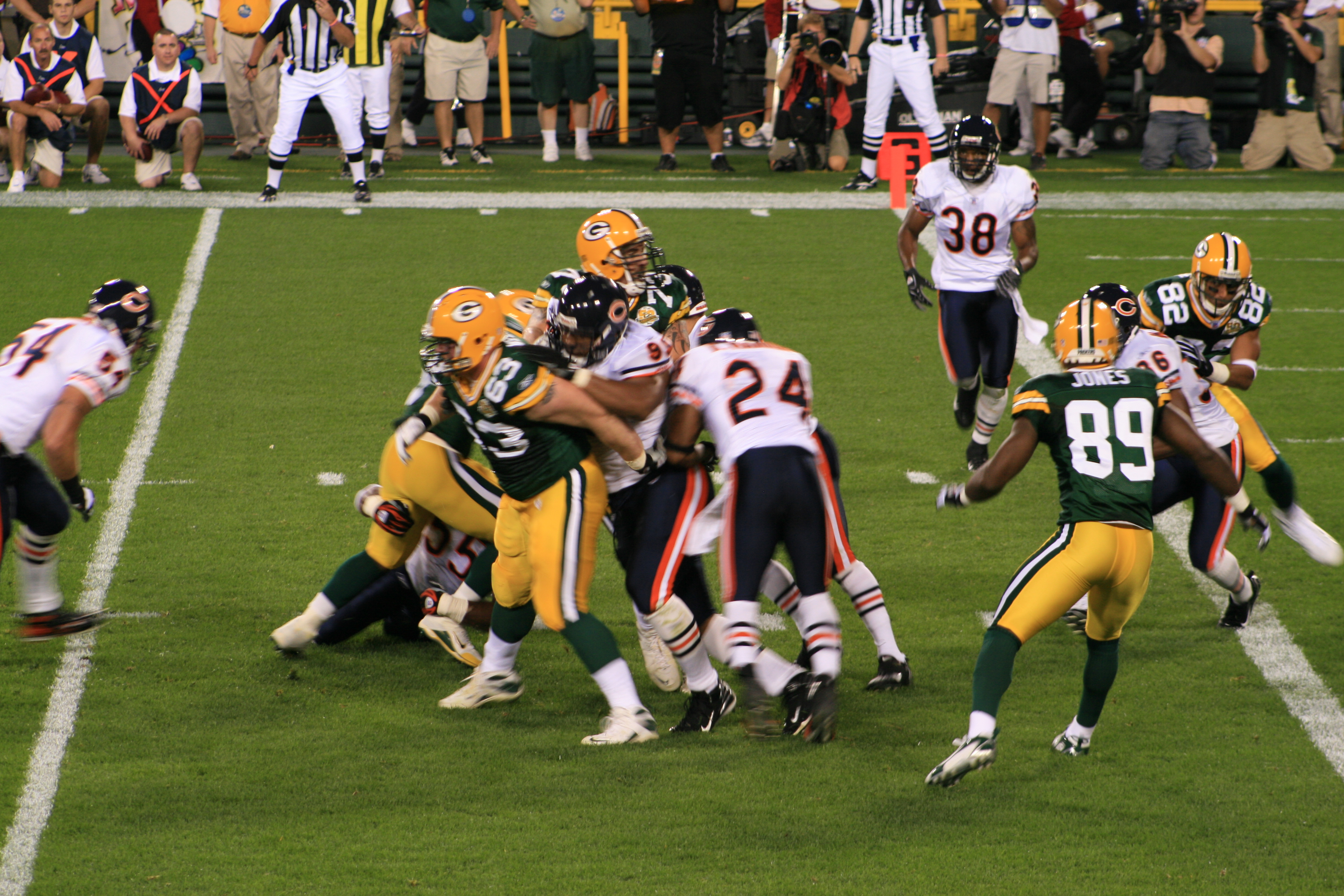
Play at the goal line, Chicago at Green Bay

=== Week 6: vs. Minnesota Vikings ===
Quarter	1	2	3	4	Total
Vikings	7	7	7	13	34
Bears	7	7	0	17	31

at Soldier Field, Chicago, Illinois

- Game time: 1:02 pm EDT/12:02 pm CDT
- Game weather: 55 °F (13 °C) (Cloudy)
- Game attendance: 62,174
- Referee: Gene Steratore
- TV announcers (Fox): Dick Stockton (play-by-play) and Brian Baldinger (color commentator)

==== Game summary ====
Following their victory against the Packers, the Bears returned home to play the Minnesota Vikings. The Bears' return specialist Devin Hester allowed the Bears to take a lead by returning a punt 89 yards for a touchdown. However, Tarvaris Jackson tied the game by throwing a 60-yard touchdown pass to Troy Williamson. Brian Griese threw a 39-yard touchdown to Bernard Berrian that helped the Bears regain the lead, but Minnesota running back Adrian Peterson helped the Vikings gain control of the game by scoring rushing touchdowns of 67, 73, and 35 respectively. With roughly two and a half minutes left on the clock, Griese threw a 33-yard touchdown pass to Muhsin Muhammad and later an 81-yard touchdown pass to Hester. The two touchdowns tied the game, but Ryan Longwell kicked a 55-yard field goal in the game's final seconds. With the loss, the Bears dropped to 2–4.

==== Scoring summary ====
Q1 – CHI – 1:56 – Devin Hester 89-yard punt return TD (Robbie Gould kick) (CHI 7–0)

Q1 – MIN – 0:00 – 60-yard TD pass from Tarvaris Jackson to Troy Williamson (Ryan Longwell kick) (7–7)

Q2 – CHI – 11:45 – 39-yard TD pass from Brian Griese to Bernard Berrian (Gould kick) (CHI 14–7)

Q2 – MIN – 2:19 – Adrian Peterson 67-yard TD run (Longwell kick) (14–14)

Q3 – MIN – 2:31 – Adrian Peterson 73-yard TD run (Longwell kick) (MIN 21–14)

Q4 – MIN – 11:31 – Ryan Longwell 48-yard FG (MIN 24–14)

Q4 – CHI – 8:37 – Robbie Gould 32-yard FG (MIN 24–17)

Q4 – MIN – 4:10 – Adrian Peterson 35-yard TD run (Longwell kick) (MIN 31–17)

Q4 – CHI – 2:36 – 33-yard TD pass from Brian Griese to Muhsin Muhammad (Gould kick) (MIN 31–24)

Q4 – CHI – 1:38 – 81-yard TD pass from Brian Griese to Devin Hester (Gould kick) (31–31)

Q4 – MIN – 0:00 – Ryan Longwell 55-yard FG (MIN 34–31)

=== Week 7: at Philadelphia Eagles ===
Quarter	1	2	3	4	Total
Bears	0	3	3	13	19
Eagles	3	6	0	7	16

at Lincoln Financial Field, Philadelphia, Pennsylvania

- Game time: 4:15 pm EDT/3:15 pm CDT
- Game weather: 75 °F (24 °C) (Sunny)
- Game attendance: 67,806
- Referee: Ed Hochuli
- TV announcers (Fox): Dick Stockton (play-by-play) and Brian Baldinger (color commentator)

==== Game summary ====
The Eagles fell to the Chicago Bears in the closing seconds of the game. The first three-quarters were essentially a battle of field goals. David Akers successfully converted all three of his first-half field goal attempts, the longest from 37 yards out. Robbie Gould was one for two, and the score was 9–3 Philadelphia at halftime. The Bears took the ball to the Eagles' one-yard line on their first drive of the third quarter, but settled for a field goal. Gould connected for two more field goals early in the fourth quarter to tie the game, then put the Bears ahead 12–9. On their ensuing possession, Donovan McNabb guided the Eagles down the field and fired a touchdown pass to tight end Matt Schobel, putting Philadelphia back on top 16–12 with less than five minutes to play. The Eagles forced a three and out, but their offense could not kill the clock. Chicago got the ball back with less than two minutes left and Brian Griese, with his headset broken, commanded his own drive, marching his team down the field, completing the winning touchdown pass to Muhsin Muhammad with nine seconds remaining. The Eagles fell short on their final opportunity, as the Bears improved to 3–4 with the win.

==== Scoring summary ====
Q1 – PHI – 1:01 – David Akers 24-yard FG (PHI 3–0)

Q2 – PHI – 4:08 – David Akers 33-yard FG (PHI 6–0)

Q2 – CHI – 1:46 – Robbie Gould 31-yard FG (PHI 6–3)

Q2 – PHI – 0:22 – David Akers 37-yard FG (PHI 9–3)

Q3 – CHI – 8:04 – Robbie Gould 22-yard FG (PHI 9–6)

Q4 – CHI – 14:52 – Robbie Gould 41-yard FG (9–9)

Q4 – CHI – 9:21 – Robbie Gould 45-yard FG (CHI 12–9)

Q4 – PHI – 4:57 – 13-yard TD pass from Donovan McNabb to Matt Schobel (Akers kick) (PHI 16–12)

Q4 – CHI – 0:09 – 15-yard TD pass from Brian Griese to Muhsin Muhammad (Gould kick) (CHI 19–16)

=== Week 8: vs. Detroit Lions ===
Quarter	1	2	3	4	Total
Lions	0	13	0	3	16
Bears	0	0	7	0	7

at Soldier Field, Chicago, Illinois

- Game time: 1:00 pm EDT/12:00 pm CDT
- Game weather: 51 °F (11 °C) (Sunny)
- Game attendance: 62,171
- Referee: Peter Morelli
- TV announcers (FOX): Sam Rosen and Tim Ryan

==== Game summary ====
Coming off a last-second road win over the Eagles, the Bears went home for Week 8, donned their alternate uniforms, and played an NFC North rematch with the Detroit Lions. After a scoreless first quarter, Chicago trailed as Lions kicker Jason Hanson got a 26-yard field goal, while RB Kevin Jones got a 4-yard TD run. Afterwards, Hanson increased Detroit's lead with a 52-yard field goal.

In the third quarter, the Bears got on the board with QB Brian Griese completing a 20-yard TD pass to rookie TE Greg Olsen for the only score of the period. The Lions sealed Chicago's doom as Hanson nailed a 20-yard field goal, while Detroit's defense held its ground and got the season-sweep.

With the loss, the Bears entered their bye week at 3–5.

==== Scoring summary ====
Q2 – DET – 14:56 – Jason Hanson 26-yard FG (DET 3–0)

Q2 – DET – 1:53 – Kevin Jones 4-yard TD run (Hanson kick) (DET 10–0)

Q2 – DET – 0:05 – Jason Hanson 52-yard FG (DET 13–0)

Q3 – CHI – 5:26 – 20-yard TD pass from Brian Griese to Greg Olsen (Robbie Gould kick) (DET 13–7)

Q4 – DET – 14:42 – Jason Hanson 20-yard FG (DET 16–7)

=== Week 10: at Oakland Raiders ===
Quarter	1	2	3	4	Total
Bears	0	3	0	14	17
Raiders	3	0	0	3	6

at McAfee Coliseum, Oakland, California

- Game time: 4:15 pm EDT/1:15 pm PDT
- Game weather: 62 °F (17 °C) (Sunny)
- Game attendance: 62,715
- Referee: Mike Carey
- TV announcers: (FOX) Matt Vasgersian and J.C. Pearson

==== Game summary ====
Coming off their bye week, the Bears flew to McAfee Coliseum for a Week 10 interconference duel with the Oakland Raiders. In the first quarter, Chicago trailed early as Raiders kicker Sebastian Janikowski got a 37-yard field goal for the only score of the period. In the second quarter, the Bears tied the game as kicker Robbie Gould kicked a 32-yard field goal for the only score of the period. However, during the period, starting QB Brian Griese (10/14 for 97 yards) had to leave the game as his left shoulder was injured during a sack. It would mark the return of QB Rex Grossman.

After a scoreless third quarter, Oakland regained the lead in the fourth quarter with Janikowski nailing a 52-yard field goal. Chicago took the lead for good as Grossman completed a 59-yard TD pass to WR Bernard Berrian, along with RB Cedric Benson getting a 3-yard TD run.

With the win, not only did the Bears improve to 4–5, but it also marked their first road win against the Raiders since 1987 when playing in Los Angeles and first at Oakland since 1981. The Bears did beat them at Soldier Field in 2003, 24–21.

==== Scoring summary ====
Q1 – OAK – 9:18 – Sebastian Janikowski 37-yard FG (OAK 3–0)

Q2 – CHI – 6:51 – Robbie Gould 32-yard FG (3–3)

Q4 – OAK – 4:04 – Sebastian Janikowski 52-yard FG (OAK 6–3)

Q4 – CHI – 3:11 – 59-yard TD pass from Rex Grossman to Bernard Berrian (Gould kick) (CHI 10–6)

Q4 – CHI – 1:35 – Cedric Benson 3-yard TD run (Gould kick) (CHI 17–6)

=== Week 11: at Seattle Seahawks ===
Quarter	1	2	3	4	Total
Bears	10	7	0	6	23
Seahawks	7	10	7	6	30

at Qwest Field, Seattle, Washington

- Game time: 4:15 pm EDT/1:15 pm PDT
- Game weather: 46 °F (8 °C) (Cloudy)
- Game attendance: 68,249
- Referee: John Parry
- TV announcers (FOX): Matt Vasgersian (play-by-play) and J.C. Pearson (color commentator)

Coming off their road win over the Raiders, the Bears flew to Qwest Field for a Week 11 duel with the Seattle Seahawks, in a rematch of last year's NFC divisional game (which took place in Chicago). QB Rex Grossman made his first start since Week 3.

In the first quarter, Chicago took the early lead with RB Cedric Benson getting a 43-yard TD run, while kicker Robbie Gould made a 31-yard field goal. The Seahawks replied with QB Matt Hasselbeck completing a 19-yard TD pass to WR D.J. Hackett. In the second quarter, Seattle took the lead with RB Maurice Morris getting a 19-yard TD run. The Bears regained the lead as RB Adrian Peterson got a 5-yard TD run. The Seahawks tied the game prior to halftime as kicker Josh Brown made a 40-yard field goal.

In the third quarter, Seattle retook the lead as Hasselbeck completed a 4-yard TD pass to WR Nate Burleson for the only score of the period. In the fourth quarter, Chicago tried to come back as Gould kicked a 47-yard field goal. However, the Seahawks pulled away with Brown kicking a 23-yard and a 46-yard field goal. The Bears' final response was Gould nailing a 48-yard field goal.

With the loss, Chicago fell to 4–6.

For Rex Grossman's first starting appearance in eight weeks, he went 24/37 for 266 yards.

For Bernard Berrian, in his last three games against the Seahawks, he had a combined 315 receiving yards.

=== Week 12: vs. Denver Broncos ===
Quarter	1	2	3	4	OT	Total
Broncos	3	10	14	7	0	34
Bears	3	3	14	14	3	37

at Soldier Field, Chicago, Illinois

- Game time: 4:15 pm EDT/1:15 pm PDT
- Game weather: 39 °F (4 °C) (Cloudy with Flurries and Drizzles)
- Game attendance: 62,148
- Referee: Larry Nemmers
- TV announcers (CBS): Greg Gumbel (play-by-play) and Dan Dierdorf (color commentator)

"We're going after it. We're not going to kick away from him. Hey, we respect him and he's the best, but we have guys on our coverage teams that are paid to make big tackles."
~Todd Sauerbrun's pregame quote on Devin Hester

Hoping to rebound from their road loss to the Seahawks, the Bears went home for a Week 12 interconference duel with the Denver Broncos. In the first quarter, Chicago got the early lead as kicker Robbie Gould made a 24-yard field goal. The Broncos tied the game as kicker Jason Elam made a 23-yard field goal. In the second quarter, Denver took the lead as RB Andre Hall got a 16-yard TD run. Afterwards, the Bears responded with Gould kicking a 44-yard field goal. The Broncos ended the half with Elam kicking a 22-yard field goal.

In the third quarter, the Bears tied the game with WR/KR/PR Devin Hester returning a punt 75 yards for a touchdown. Denver responded with FB Cecil Sapp getting a 5-yard TD run, but afterwards, Hester went right back to work for Chicago as he returned the following kickoff 88 yards for a touchdown. Afterwards, the Broncos replied with QB Jay Cutler completing a 68-yard TD pass to WR Brandon Marshall. In the fourth quarter, Denver increased its lead with Cutler completing a 14-yard TD pass to TE Tony Scheffler. Afterwards, the Bears tied the game with RB Adrian Peterson getting a 4-yard TD run, along with QB Rex Grossman completing a 3-yard TD pass to WR Bernard Berrian. In overtime, Chicago came out on top as Gould made the game-winning 39-yard field goal.

With the win, the Bears improved to 5–6.

Devin Hester became the fifth player since 1970 to return a kickoff and a punt for a touchdown in the same game.

=== Week 13: vs. New York Giants ===
Quarter	1	2	3	4	Total
Giants	0	7	0	14	21
Bears	7	6	3	0	16

at Soldier Field, Chicago, Illinois

- Game time: 4:15 p.m. EST
- Game weather: 46 °F (8 °C) (Chance of Showers)
- Game attendance: 62,244
- Referee: Walt Coleman
- TV announcers (FOX): Joe Buck (play-by-play), Troy Aikman (color commentator), and Pam Oliver (sideline reporter)

Coming off their overtime win over the Broncos, the Bears stayed at home for a Week 13 intraconference duel with the New York Giants. In the first quarter, Chicago struck first with QB Rex Grossman completing a 1-yard TD pass to TE Desmond Clark for the only score of the period. In the second quarter, the Giants got on the board with RB Derrick Ward. Afterwards, the Bears ended the half with kicker Robbie Gould getting a 35-yard and a 46-yard field goal.

In the third quarter, Chicago increased its lead with Gould nailing a 41-yard field goal for the only score of the period. However, in the fourth quarter, New York took the lead with QB Eli Manning completing a 6-yard TD pass to WR Amani Toomer, along with RB Reuben Droughns. The Bears did have one final attempt, but it ended with a thud.

With the loss, Chicago fell to 5–7.

=== Week 14: at Washington Redskins ===
Quarter	1	2	3	4	Total
Bears	0	0	10	6	16
Redskins	0	7	7	10	24

at FedExField, Landover, Maryland

- Game time: 8:00 pm EDT/7:00 pm CDT
- Game weather: 26 °F (−3 °C) (Clear)
- Game attendance: 82,213
- Referee: Jerome Boger
- TV announcers (NFL Network): ' Bryant Gumbel (play-by-play) and Cris Collinsworth (color commentator)

Hoping to rebound from their home loss to the Giants (along with keeping any hope of a playoff spot alive), the Bears flew to FedExField for a Thursday Night intraconference throwdown with the Washington Redskins. After a scoreless first quarter, Chicago trailed as Redskins QB Todd Collins completed a 21-yard TD pass to TE Todd Yoder for the only score of the second quarter.

In the third quarter, the Bears continued to trail as Washington continued its night with FB Mike Sellers getting a 1-yard TD run. Afterwards, Chicago would get on the board with kicker Robbie Gould getting a 30-yard field goal, while QB Brian Griese completed a 17-yard TD pass to WR Bernard Berrian. In the fourth quarter, the Redskins replied with kicker Shaun Suisham getting a 23-yard field goal. Afterwards, the Bears responded with Gould kicking a 22-yard field goal. Later, Washington struck big as Collins completed a 16-yard TD pass to RB Ladell Betts. Chicago would draw closer as Gould nailed a 21-yard field goal. However, a failed onside kick sealed their doom.

With the loss, the Bears fell to 5–8.

Starting QB Rex Grossman (2 of 6 for 14 yards) left the game in the first quarter with a left knee injury.

=== Week 15: at Minnesota Vikings ===
Quarter	1	2	3	4	Total
Bears	3	10	0	0	13
Vikings	0	6	6	8	20

at Hubert H. Humphrey Metrodome, Minneapolis, Minnesota

- Game time: 8:30 pm EDT/7:30 pm CDT
- Game weather: Game Played Indoors (Domed Stadium)
- Game attendance: 63,800
- Referee: Tony Corrente
- TV announcers (ESPN): Mike Tirico (play-by-play), Ron Jaworski, Tony Kornheiser (color commentators), Michele Tafoya, & Suzy Kolber (sideline reporters)

Trying to snap a two-game skid, the Bears flew to the Hubert H. Humphrey Metrodome for a Week 15 Monday night NFC North rematch with the Minnesota Vikings. In the first quarter, Chicago struck first as kicker Robbie Gould got a 29-yard field goal for the only score of the period. In the second quarter, the Vikings tied the game with kicker Ryan Longwell getting a 42-yard field goal. Afterwards, the Bears would take the halftime lead as Gould kicked a 47-yard field goal and FB Jason McKie managed to get a 1-yard TD run.

In the third quarter, Minnesota started to creep closer as RB Adrian Peterson got a 1-yard TD run (with a failed PAT) for the only score of the period. In the fourth quarter, the Vikings took the lead with Peterson getting an 8-yard TD run. Chicago tried to rally, but Minnesota's defense was too much.

With their third-straight loss, not only did the Bears fall to 5–9, but they were knocked out of playoff contention.

On a positive note, LB Brian Urlacher had a good day with 4 tackles, 2 sacks, and an interception. It was also the first time since 2004 that Urlacher had a sack and an interception in the same game.

=== Week 16: vs. Green Bay Packers ===
Quarter	1	2	3	4	Total
Packers	0	7	0	0	7
Bears	3	10	15	7	35

at Soldier Field, Chicago, Illinois

- Game time: 1:00 p.m. EST
- Referee: Jeff Triplette
- TV announcers (FOX): Joe Buck (play-by-play), Troy Aikman (color commentator), and Pam Oliver (sideline reporter)

"I've been playing 17 years, and that was the worst condition I've ever played in. Excuse? No excuse. It was, but they handled it better than we did. We have historically handled it well. It's kind of our ace in the hole, but today, obviously, it wasn't."
~Brett Favre commentating on the game's poor weather.

The Bears went into Week 16 knowing that any chance of a playoff berth was over, but they still had the chance to end the season on a high with their rivals the Green Bay Packers traveling to Soldier Field. The game was a must-win for the Packers if they wanted to have any chance of getting the No. 1 seed and gain home-field advantage in the playoffs.

On a 16-degree afternoon in Chicago, reserve RB Adrian Peterson ran for 102 yards from 30 attempts including and 8-yard run for a TD (only the second 100-yard game of his career and his first since 2005) while Garrett Wolfe also gained 67 all-purpose yards from the RB position. However, it was the Chicago special teams that really excelled in this game.

After Green Bay previously going 12 years (929 punts) without a blocked punt, the Bears blocked Jon Ryan twice on a slippery afternoon. In the second quarter, Darrell McClover got his hand onto a Ryan punt but more damaging was Charles Tillman's charge down midway through the third quarter which allowed Corey Graham to pick up the football and run in 7 yards for a TD to put the Bears up 28–7.

Kyle Orton, Lovie Smith's third-choice QB, went 8-for-14 for 101 yards including a 3-yard touchdown pass to Desmond Clark in the third quarter. It was also a good day for LB Brian Urlacher who ran home an 85-yard interception early in the fourth quarter, the first of his career. Alex Brown, starting for the injured Mark Anderson, also got an interception which set up Clark's touchdown.

In the end, it was a fairly comfortable win for the Bears, who ran out 35–7 victors which meant that they completed the double over their arch rivals having previously beating them at Lambeau Field in Week 5 27–20. Also, these 35 points were their most against Green Bay since a 61–7 win on December 7, 1980. This game remains the most recent time the Bears have beaten the Packers by more than a one possession margin.

=== Week 17: vs. New Orleans Saints ===
Quarter	1	2	3	4	Total
Saints	0	17	0	8	25
Bears	10	14	7	2	33

at Soldier Field, Chicago, Illinois

- Game time: 1:00 p.m. EST
- Referee: Bill Leavy
- TV announcers (FOX): Dick Stockton, Brian Baldinger
