= Danieal Manning =

American football player and coach (born 1982)

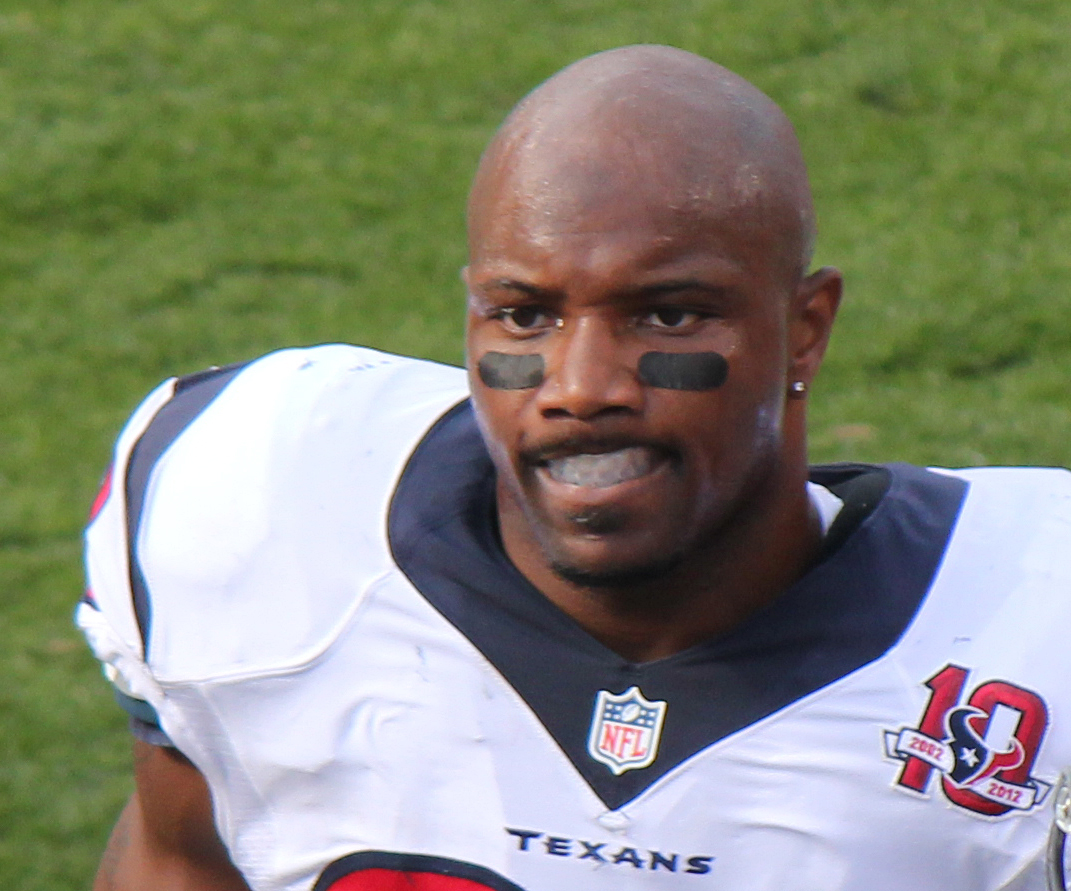
- Manning with the Houston Texans in 2012

No. 38, 27
- Position: Safety

Personal information
- Born: August 9, 1982 (age 44); Corsicana, Texas, U.S.
- Listed height: 5 ft 11 in (1.80 m)
- Listed weight: 211 lb (96 kg)

Career information
- High school: Corsicana
- College: Abilene Christian (2001–2005)
- NFL draft: 2006: 2nd round, 42nd overall pick

Career history

Playing
- Chicago Bears (2006–2010); Houston Texans (2011–2013); Cincinnati Bengals (2014)*; Houston Texans (2014)
- * Offseason or practice squad member only

Coaching
- Abilene Christian (2017–2018) Assistant coach

Career NFL statistics
- Total tackles: 552
- Sacks: 4.0
- Forced fumbles: 9
- Interceptions: 11
- Total return yards: 3,370
- Total touchdowns: 2
- Stats at Pro Football Reference

Danieal LaCraig Manning (born August 9, 1982) is an American former professional football player who was a safety in the National Football League (NFL). He played college football for the Abilene Christian Wildcats and was selected by the Chicago Bears in the second round of the 2006 NFL draft.

== Early life ==
Before college, he was a highly touted defensive back at Corsicana High School in Corsicana, Texas. A three-year starter, as a senior he totaled 67 tackles, three interceptions and three blocked kicks and was named second-team all-state by the Associated Press and the Texas Sports Writers Association. He also starred in track, finishing second in the state in Class 4A in both the 100-meter dash and triple jump

== College career ==
Manning originally signed with the University of Nebraska–Lincoln, but he never enrolled there, choosing to attend Abilene Christian University. On the Abilene Christian Wildcats football team, as a sophomore he was named Division II third-team All-American at defensive back, as a junior first-team All-American as a return specialist, and as a senior first-team All-American as a defensive back.

== Professional career ==
=== Pre-draft ===
Manning was ranked as the ninth best safety available in the 2006 NFL draft by Sports Illustrated.

Pre-draft measurables
Height	Weight	Arm length	Hand span	40-yard dash	10-yard split	20-yard split	20-yard shuttle	Three-cone drill	Vertical jump	Broad jump	Bench press
5 ft 10 3/4 in (1.80 m)	202 lb (92 kg)	31 1/2 in (0.80 m)	8 3/4 in (0.22 m)	4.49 s	1.61 s	2.64 s	4.07 s	7.23 s	39.0 in (0.99 m)	10 ft 3 in (3.12 m)	17 reps
All values from NFL Combine

=== Chicago Bears ===
The Chicago Bears selected Manning in the second round (42nd overall) of the 2006 NFL draft. He was the highest selection from Abilene Christian University since Johnny Perkins in 1977) and was also the first player from a non-Division I in 2006.

Midway through the 2008 NFL season, Manning took over Devin Hester's duties as the Bears' kick returner. On December 11, 2008, he returned a kickoff 83 yards for a touchdown, making it the first regular season opening kickoff returned for a touchdown for the Bears since 1972. A week before this touchdown, Manning picked off David Garrard's pass on the Jaguars opening drive, and returned it to the Jaguars five-yard line.

Manning led the league in return average and number of 30+-yard returns, despite only starting half the season. Manning was Bears starting nickelback in 2008, and competed with Josh Bullocks, Corey Graham, Kevin Payne, and Craig Steltz for starting free safety. Manning won the starting position before the start of the Bears 2009 summer training camp. On passing downs, Manning played nickelback, while Steltz filled in for him at free safety. Due to Manning's larger role on defense, the Bears chose second-year wide receiver Johnny Knox to take over kick-returning duties.

=== Houston Texans (first stint) ===
Manning signed a four-year, $20 million contract (with $9 million guaranteed) with the Houston Texans on July 28, 2011.

In week 4 of the 2012 season, Manning intercepted Tennessee Titans quarterback Matt Hasselbeck and returned it 55 yards for the first defensive touchdown of his career.

On March 31, 2014, Manning was released by the Texans.

=== Cincinnati Bengals ===
On April 3, 2014, Manning signed a one-year deal with the Cincinnati Bengals.

=== Houston Texans (second stint) ===
On September 1, 2014, Manning signed with the Texans.

Manning announced his retirement from the NFL on July 14, 2015.

== Coaching career ==
On December 18, 2018, Manning announced he would be returning to his alma mater Abilene Christian as an assistant coach on Adam Dorrel's staff.

=== NFL statistics ===
Year	Team	GP	COMB	TOTAL	AST	SACK	FF	FR	FR YDS	INT	IR YDS	AVG IR	LNG	TD	PD
2006	CHI	16	70	54	16	0.0	4	1	0	2	26	13	15	0	7
2007	CHI	16	79	68	11	0.0	0	0	0	2	33	17	33	0	6
2008	CHI	14	33	28	5	1.0	0	0	0	1	42	42	42	0	4
2009	CHI	15	92	72	20	1.0	2	2	4	1	35	35	35	0	2
2010	CHI	16	72	59	13	0.0	0	0	0	1	0	0	0	0	7
2011	HOU	13	59	44	15	0.0	0	0	0	2	22	11	22	0	5
2012	HOU	16	77	59	18	1.0	3	1	1	2	59	30	55	1	8
2013	HOU	6	24	21	3	1.0	0	0	0	0	0	0	0	0	2
2014	HOU	16	46	32	14	0.0	0	0	0	0	0	0	0	0	2
Career		128	552	437	115	4.0	9	4	0	11	217	20	55	1	43
