= Trumaine =

Name list

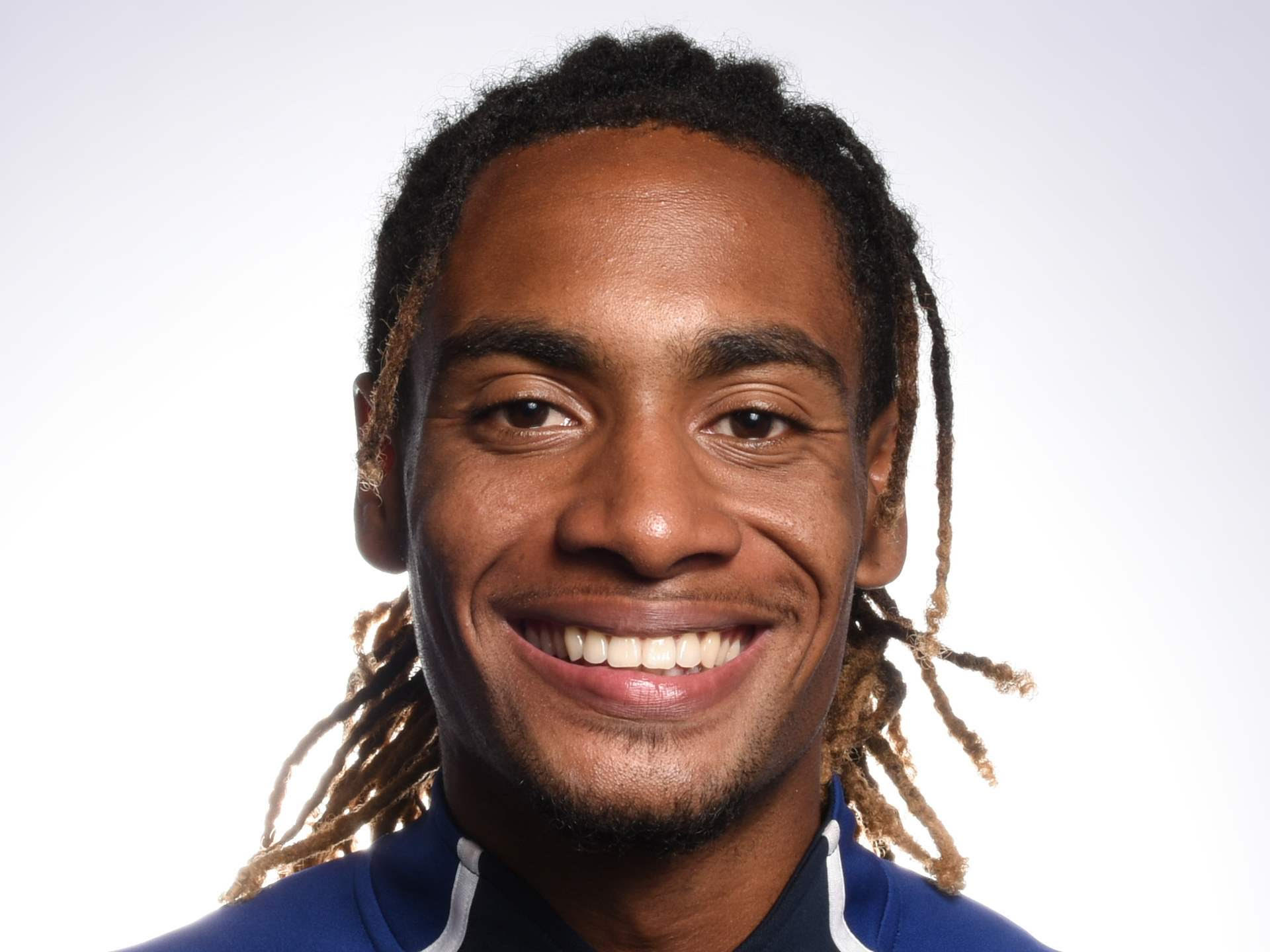
Trumaine Jefferson

Trumaine is a given name. Notable people with the given name include:

- Trumaine Johnson (cornerback) (born 1990), American football player
- Trumaine Johnson (wide receiver) (born 1960), American football player
- Trumaine McBride (born 1985), American football player
- Trumaine Sykes (born 1982), American football player
