= Aaron Brant =

American football player (born 1984)

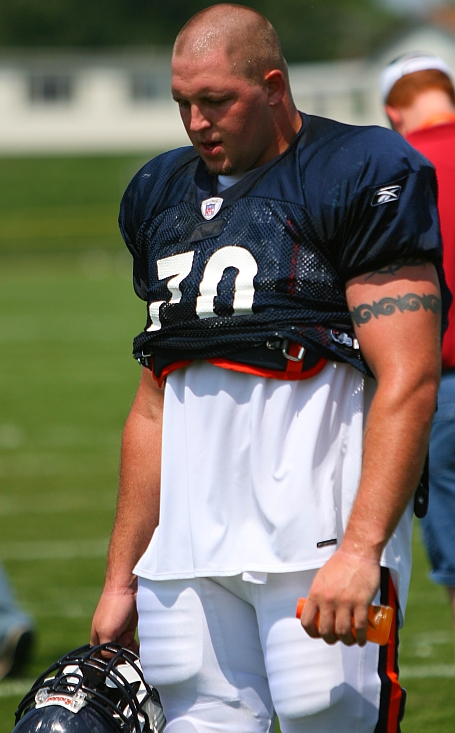
- Brant at the Chicago Bears 2007 training camp

Profile
- Position: Offensive tackle

Personal information
- Born: September 16, 1984 (age 42); Dubuque, Iowa, U.S.
- Listed height: 6 ft 7 in (2.01 m)
- Listed weight: 320 lb (145 kg)

Career information
- College: Iowa State
- NFL draft: 2007: 7th round, 241st overall pick

Career history
- Chicago Bears (2007)*
- * Offseason or practice squad member only

Aaron Brant (born September 16, 1984) is an American former professional football offensive tackle. He was selected by the Chicago Bears of the National Football League (NFL) in the seventh round of the 2007 NFL draft.

== Early life ==
Brant attended Wahlert High School in Dubuque, Iowa, where he was named 1st Team All-State as a senior.

== College career ==
Brant played college football at Iowa State University. In the 2003 season, Brant played offensive guard before moving to offensive tackle in the 2004 season. Before Brant's final season in 2006, he was ranked among the top 13 offensive tackles in college football by the Sporting News.

== Professional career ==
Picked in the last round of the 2007 NFL draft by the Chicago Bears, Brant was waived on August 15, 2007, due to problems with his knees. Brant was the first drafted player to be cut in their first season by general manager Jerry Angelo.

== Coaching career ==
Brant has served as the Cornell Rams defensive line coach.
