= Cedric Benson =

American football player (1982–2019)

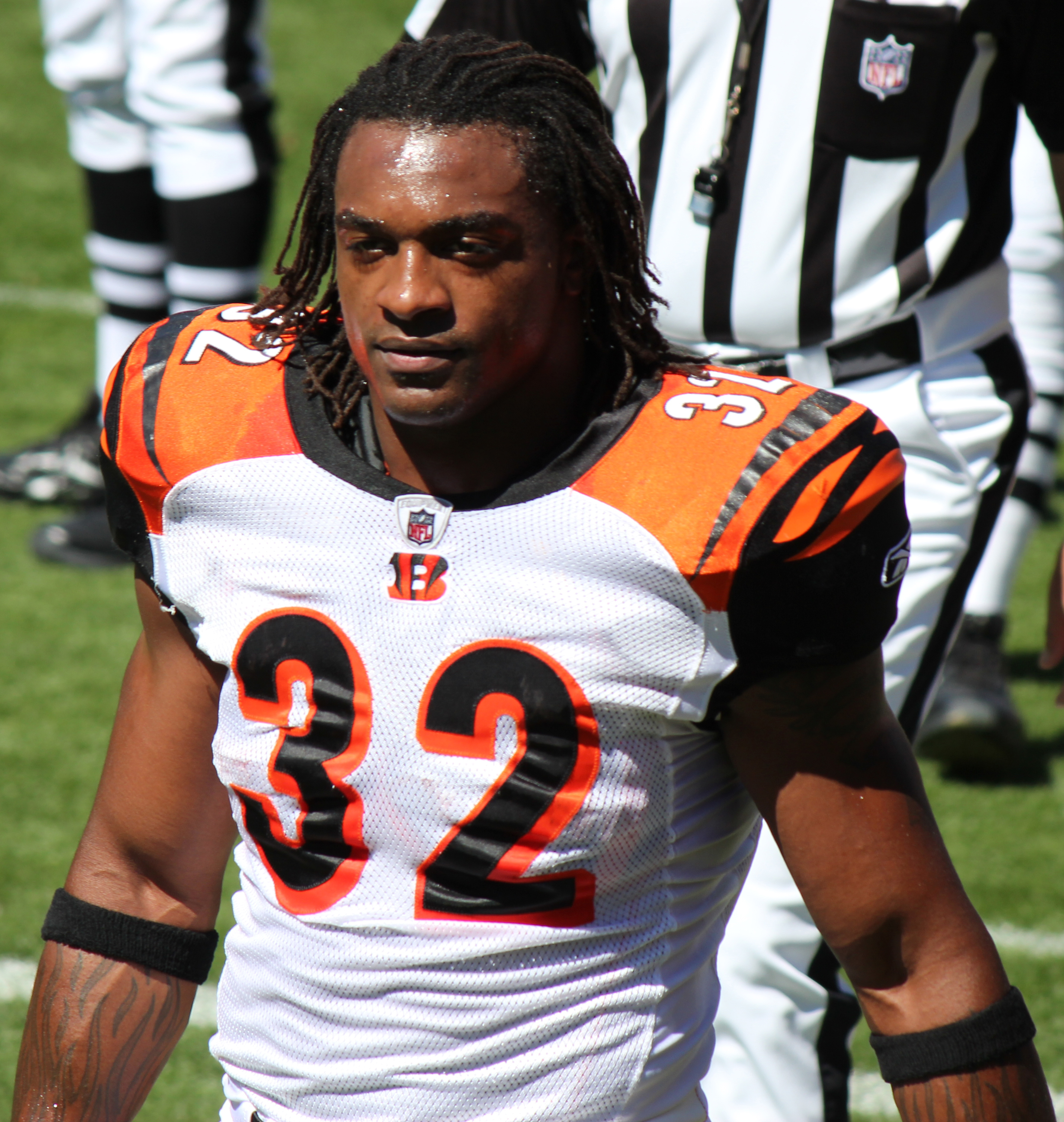
- Benson with the Cincinnati Bengals in 2011

No. 32
- Position: Running back

Personal information
- Born: December 28, 1982; Midland, Texas, U.S.
- Died: August 17, 2019 (aged 36); Austin, Texas, U.S.
- Listed height: 5 ft 11 in (1.80 m)
- Listed weight: 227 lb (103 kg)

Career information
- High school: Lee (Midland)
- College: Texas (2001–2004)
- NFL draft: 2005: 1st round, 4th overall pick

Career history
- Chicago Bears (2005–2007); Cincinnati Bengals (2008–2011); Green Bay Packers (2012)

Awards and highlights
- Doak Walker Award (2004); First-team All-American (2004); 2× First-team All-Big 12 (2003, 2004); Second-team All-Big 12 (2002); Third-team All-Big 12 (2001); Big 12 Offensive Freshman of the Year (2001)

Career NFL statistics
- Rushing attempts: 1,600
- Rushing yards: 6,017
- Rushing touchdowns: 32
- Receptions: 120
- Receiving yards: 833
- Receiving touchdowns: 1
- Stats at Pro Football Reference

Cedric Myron Benson (December 28, 1982 – August 17, 2019) was an American professional football player who spent eight years as a running back in the National Football League (NFL) for the Chicago Bears, Cincinnati Bengals and Green Bay Packers. He played college football for the Texas Longhorns and won the Doak Walker Award in 2004. He was selected by Chicago with the fourth overall pick in the 2005 NFL draft.

== Early life ==
Benson began to emerge as a football stand-out in the eighth grade while attending Abell Junior High School in Midland, Texas. Benson attended Robert E. Lee High School in Midland and finished his high-school playing career with 8,423 rushing yards (the most in Texas 5A history, largest classification at the time and the fourth-most in Texas high school football history). He led his team to three consecutive state championships and rushed for a total of 15 touchdowns in the three championship games. Benson rushed for more than 1,900 yards in only nine games. He rushed for over 3,500 yards (51 touchdowns) during his junior year, when his team went undefeated and won state and national championships. He became the first high-school player to appear on the cover of the Dave Campbell's Texas Football annual magazine. Benson was also a center fielder on the baseball team. As a senior, in District 4-5A games, he hit .361 with four home runs and 14 RBIs.

== College career ==
Benson attended the University of Texas at Austin, where he was a four-year starter for the Longhorns football team. As a senior in 2004, he won the Doak Walker Award as the nation's top running back and was recognized as a first-team All-American. He finished his college career with 5,540 rushing yards to rank tenth all-time in NCAA Division I-A history, and second only to Ricky Williams in Longhorns team history.

He was often compared to Williams because of similarities in running style, college choice suspensions, appearance (roughly the same size and build in college, and both with dreadlocks early in their careers) and the fact that they had both been minor-league baseball players.

While at Texas, Benson majored in social work and sociology. He was included on the Texas athletics directors' academic honor roll and the Big 12 commissioner's honor roll in Fall 2003. While in college, Benson was arrested twice, once for possession of marijuana and the other for trespassing. The marijuana case was dropped after a friend claimed responsibility. Benson was sentenced to eight days in jail for the trespassing conviction, but he spent no time in prison because of overcrowding at the Travis County Jail. He was forced to serve a one-half game suspension against Baylor University.

== Professional football career ==
Pre-draft measurables
Height	Weight	Arm length	Hand span	40-yard dash	10-yard split	20-yard split	20-yard shuttle	Three-cone drill	Vertical jump	Bench press
5 ft 10 1/2 in (1.79 m)	222 lb (101 kg)	31 3/4 in (0.81 m)	9 in (0.23 m)	4.62 s	1.60 s	2.67 s	4.30 s	7.50 s	33.0 in (0.84 m)	21 reps
All values from NFL Combine/Pro Day

=== Chicago Bears ===
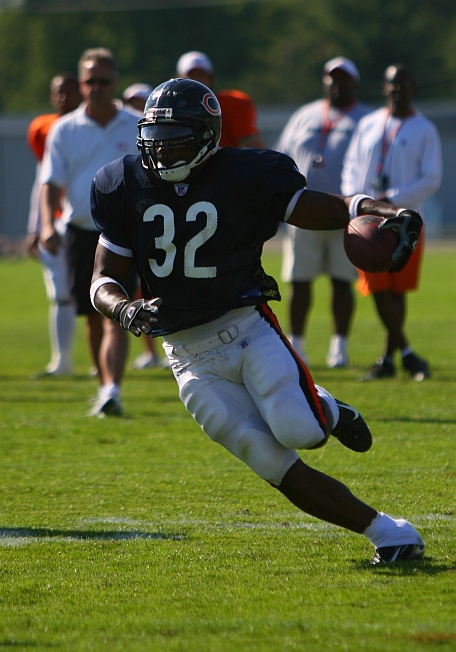
Benson practicing at the Chicago Bears' 2007 training camp.

The Chicago Bears selected Benson in the first round with the fourth overall pick in the 2005 NFL draft. Although Benson and his family were overjoyed when he was drafted, with Benson moved to tears, he and the Bears strongly disagreed on contract terms prior to the draft. After a 36-day contract holdout, Benson and the Bears finally agreed to a five-year contract worth $35 million, with a $16 million signing bonus. The Bears wished to make Benson their feature running back, but his lengthy contract impasse had caused him to miss the team's entire training camp. Benson claimed that he received a cold reception upon his return because he bragged that he would become the starter by the Bears' third game despite the holdout and lack of practice. Jay Glazer reported that certain players attempted to intentionally injure him during practice.

The team temporarily made Thomas Jones their featured running back for the beginning of the 2005 season. Jones' performance impressed the Bears' coaching staff and earned him the top spot on the team's depth chart for the next two seasons. Benson occasionally received playing time, and he rushed for 80 yards on 16 carries against the New Orleans Saints in his best game. However, shortly after the game, he suffered a medial collateral ligament sprain and missed most of the remaining season.

After 2005, the Bears considered making Benson the team's starting running back after Jones was unhappy with his contract status. The team's plans went astray when Benson injured his shoulder after colliding with Brian Urlacher during a routine scrimmage. Although the injury was not serious, it placed Benson on the sidelines for a majority of the preseason.

Although Benson fully recovered from his injury, head coach Lovie Smith selected Jones as the Bears' starter. Benson scored his first two touchdowns during week five of the 2006 season, against the Buffalo Bills. In a game against the New England Patriots during Week 12, Benson collided with linebacker Junior Seau, causing Seau to fracture his forearm.

Days later, Benson challenged Smith's coaching by remarking that "the NFL is not like high school or college, but the best players don't always get on the field." The following week, Benson outgained Jones and scored a vital touchdown against the Minnesota Vikings. He began to receive more carries as the season progressed and rushed for more than 100 yards against the Green Bay Packers.

Benson became the Bears' secondary running back again during the playoffs. In the 2006 NFC Championship Game against the New Orleans Saints, Benson scored a fourth-quarter touchdown and totaled 60 yards. Although he was given a majority of the team's carries, Jones amassed two touchdowns and 123 rushing yards. In the team's following game, Super Bowl XLI, Benson sustained a knee injury in the first half and missed the remainder of the game.

Smith named Benson as the Bears' starting running back after the team traded Jones to the New York Jets. Benson struggled throughout the preseason but retained his starting position. He amassed only 42 yards in his first regular-season game and committed a costly turnover. However, Benson rebounded with a 101-yard performance during his next start. After several inconsistent games, Benson began to stabilize after the bye week. In one of his best games of the season, Benson rushed for 89 yards and scored one touchdown on 11 attempts. He averaged 5.8 yards in his next game but sustained a season-ending ankle injury. Benson, who had amassed 647 yards and four touchdowns, was eventually relieved by Adrian N. Peterson.

Bears general manager Jerry Angelo had expressed interest in acquiring a new back to revitalize the Bears' running game, which finished last in yards in the league. Upon hearing the news, Benson commented, "You all know the competition that goes on around here. It doesn't matter to me. Maybe somebody else can get some criticism." On June 9, 2008, Benson was released by the Bears following his second alcohol-related arrest in five weeks.

In October 2009, Benson confirmed that shortly before he was released by the Bears, he had been diagnosed with celiac disease.

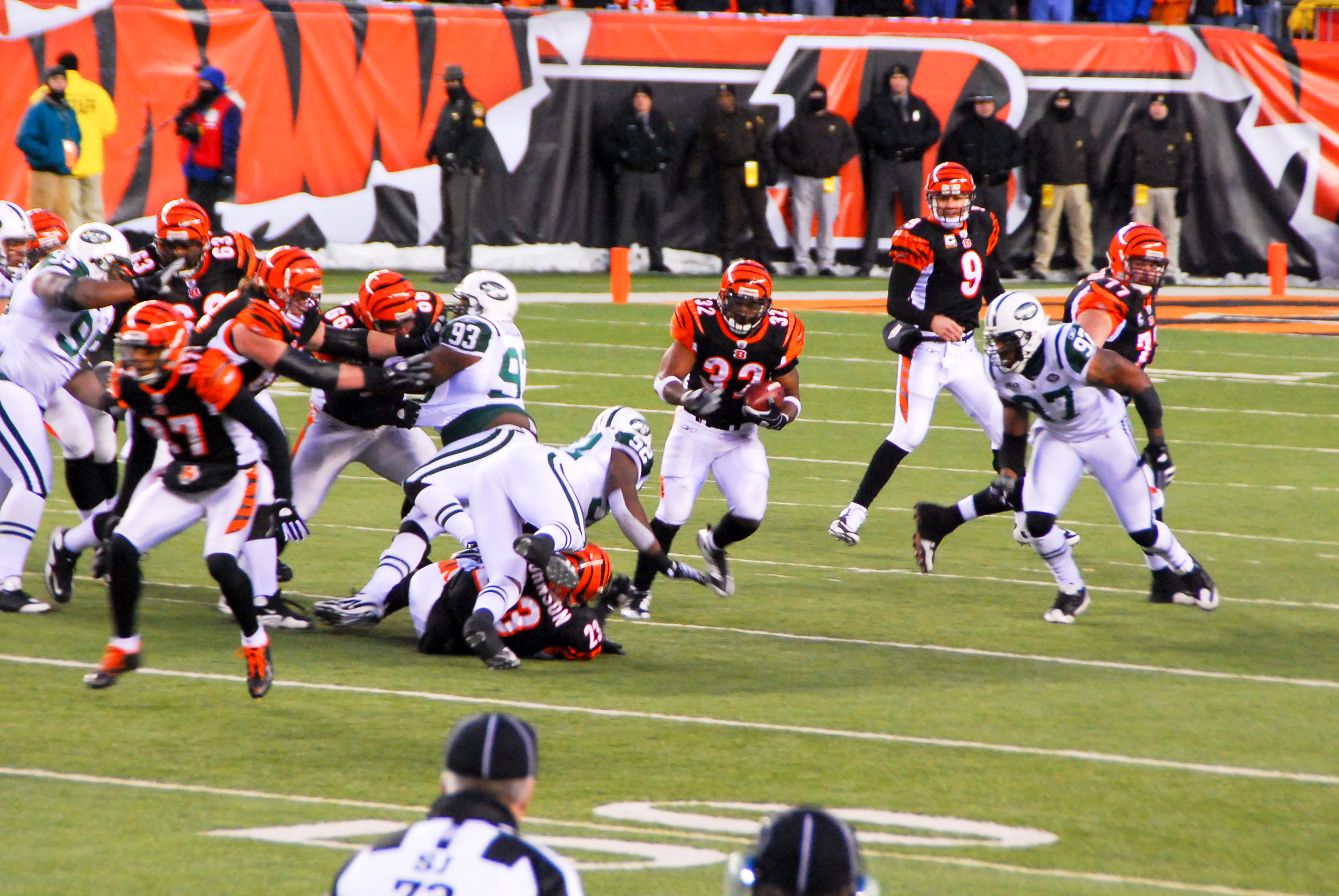
Benson running after taking a handoff from Carson Palmer against the New York Jets in a 2009 AFC Wild Card game.

In September 2016, Benson stated that "no year in Chicago was I happy.".

=== Cincinnati Bengals ===
Shortly after the grand jury failed to indict him on both incidents in Austin, Benson signed a one-year, $520,000 contract with the Cincinnati Bengals on September 30, 2008. DeDe Dorsey was placed on injured reserve and Chris Perry was the starter. Benson's season began in a loss to the Dallas Cowboys, rushing 10 times for 30 yards. He became the starting back for the Bengals in Week 7 against the Pittsburgh Steelers. Benson rushed 14 times for 52 yards in his first career start as a Bengal. In the following 35–6 loss to the Houston Texans, he totaled 49 yards on 13 carries and had two receptions for 20 yards. The Bengals picked up their first victory of the season in a 21–19 game against the Jacksonville Jaguars, with Benson carrying 24 times for 104 yards and a touchdown. Benson hit his stride in the Bengals' three-game winning streak at the end of the season, gashing the Washington Redskins in week 15 with 161 yards from scrimmage, including 88 yards receiving (79 of which came on a screen pass). In week 16, Benson dominated the Cleveland Browns, rushing for 171 yards. In the final game of the season against the Kansas City Chiefs, Benson had 111 yards on 25 carries. In the twelve games he was active during the 2008 season, Benson had 932 yards from scrimmage: 747 rushing and 185 receiving.

A free agent after the 2008 season, Benson visited with the Houston Texans before signing a two-year, $7-million contract with the Bengals on March 3, 2009.

Entering Week 8 of the 2009 season, Benson had 164 carries for an NFL-best 720 yards (4.4 per carry average). In Week 5, he became the first 100-yard rusher against the Baltimore Ravens in 40 games when he rushed for 120 yards and a touchdown. In Week 7, Benson faced his former team, the Chicago Bears, and rushed for a career-high 189 yards and a touchdown.

Benson recorded his first 1,000-yard rushing season and set a Bengals franchise record with six games with more than 100 rushing yards. He finished the season as the NFL's eighth-leading rusher with 1,251 yards despite playing only 13 games. He then set a Bengals postseason record with 169 rushing yards in a 24–14 loss to the New York Jets.

The Bengals declined to resign Benson in 2012. Coach Marvin Lewis later recounted how he explained the decision to Benson: "'Ced, it's not that I didn't think you could do that on the football field, it was the other [stuff] that I got tired of. When I would go to you and say we're going to rotate the backs [and Benson would take it poorly]. I don't need that anymore.'"

=== Green Bay Packers ===
On August 12, 2012, Benson signed with the Green Bay Packers. The deal was reportedly a one-year contract worth $825,000.

On October 7, 2012, Benson suffered a Lisfranc injury to his foot and was later placed on injured reserve.

== Professional baseball career ==
Benson was drafted by the Los Angeles Dodgers in the 12th round (370th overall) of the 2001 MLB draft. While Benson did not play in the major leagues, he spent his time with the Dodgers' summer league team in Vero Beach, Florida. He also played with the Gulf Coast League Dodgers. In 25 at-bats, he had five hits, one run, three doubles, two triples and two RBI.

== Career statistics ==
Legend
**Bold**	Career high

=== NFL ===
Year	Team	GP	Rushing						Receiving							Fumbles	
Year	Team	GP	Att	Yds	Avg	Lng	TD	FD	Rec	Tgt	Yds	Avg	Lng	TD	FD	Fum	Lost
2005	CHI	9	67	272	4.1	36	0	12	1	—	3	3.0	3	0	0	1	1
2006	CHI	15	157	647	4.1	30	6	33	8	10	54	6.8	22	0	2	0	0
2007	CHI	11	196	674	3.4	43	4	33	17	27	123	7.2	19	0	5	3	2
2008	CIN	12	214	747	3.5	**46**	2	36	20	26	**185**	**9.3**	**79**	0	6	2	1
2009	CIN	13	301	**1,251**	**4.2**	42	6	57	17	24	111	6.5	19	0	5	1	0
2010	CIN	16	**321**	1,111	3.5	26	**7**	**59**	**28**	**38**	178	6.4	24	**1**	**9**	**7**	**5**
2011	CIN	15	273	1,067	3.9	42	6	53	15	22	82	5.5	11	0	3	5	2
2012	GB	5	71	248	3.5	11	1	10	14	15	97	6.9	18	0	4	1	0
Career		96	1,600	6,017	3.8	46	32	293	120	162	833	6.9	79	1	34	20	11

=== College ===
Year	Team	GP	Rushing				Receiving		
Year	Team	GP	Att	Yds	Avg	TD	Rec	Yds	TD
2001	Texas	12	223	1,053	4.7	12	17	**203**	**1**
2002	Texas	13	305	1,293	4.2	12	21	119	0
2003	Texas	12	258	1,360	5.3	**21**	9	120	**1**
2004	Texas	12	**326**	**1,834**	**5.6**	19	**22**	179	**1**
Totals		49	1,112	5,540	5.0	64	69	621	3

== Personal life ==
Benson's cousin Aaron played linebacker for the University of Texas from 2010 to 2013, but abandoned the sport in his redshirt senior year.

Benson had celiac disease and attributed his adoption of a gluten-free diet to giving him more energy.

After his NFL career, Benson became a loan originator.

=== Legal troubles ===
==== 2008 arrests ====
Before the start of the 2008 season, Benson was arrested for allegedly operating a boat while intoxicated and resisting arrest. On May 3, 2008, the incident occurred near Austin, Texas by the Lower Colorado River Authority during a late-night safety inspection. The official police report cited that Benson had failed a field sobriety test and became hostile toward the police. The officers arrested Benson and employed pepper spray when he forcefully resisted arrest. Benson was later detained for the night and was charged with boating while intoxicated and resisting arrest.

Benson later refuted the charges against him and stated that he had requested to take a follow-up field sobriety test on land after failing the initial one. Benson had further accused the officers of abusing him, stating, "I'm not handcuffed. I'm not under arrest. I'm not threatening him. I'm not pushing him. I'm not touching him. And he sprays me right in the eye." He also asserted that officers continuously struck his ankles and feet to prevent him from walking properly. A female passenger on Benson's boat also claimed to have witnessed the abuse. Upon hearing about the incident, Bears head coach Lovie Smith stated, "I haven't had a chance to speak with Cedric yet, but anytime we're talking about one of our players getting arrested, you're disappointed in it" and added "What we're going to do from here, I'll go back and try to get as much information as I possibly can and go from there."

Benson was arrested for driving while intoxicated in Austin, Texas on June 7, 2008. While returning from a restaurant with his girlfriend, police claimed that Benson drove through a red light and failed a field sobriety test. Police claimed that he later refused to take a breath or blood test to determine his blood alcohol level. Police detained Benson, who was later released on bond. Benson denied the police officers' allegations and insisted that he "aced" the field test. Bears general manager Jerry Angelo commented, "It's unfortunate. Disappointment is too much an often used word when we're talking about Cedric. The No. 1 lesson for every player is protect your job. We're all held accountable for our actions. I'm not going to say any more than that until we know for sure what the facts are." On the following Monday, Benson was waived from the Bears. Angelo commented on the release, stating "Cedric displayed a pattern of behavior we will not tolerate... As I said this past weekend, you have to protect your job. Everyone in this organization is held accountable for their actions."

Benson was later ordered by a county judge to install an ignition interlock breathalyzer in his car. He was also instructed to attend drug counseling classes. Benson was cleared of all charges in September after appearing before two grand juries in Travis County.

==== 2010 arrest ====
On June 29, 2010, Benson was arrested for assault with injury after reportedly punching a bartender in the face. Benson denied culpability and nearly one month later the NFL announced that he would not be suspended.

==== 2011 arrest ====
On July 17, 2011, Benson was arrested in Austin for a misdemeanor charge of assault causing bodily injury to a family member. He was sentenced to 20 days in jail and ordered to pay a $4,000 fine. Benson was released from jail on September 3 after only five days of his sentence. He received a one-game suspension, enacted in Week 8.

==== 2017 arrest ====
On February 18, 2017, Benson was charged with driving while intoxicated in downtown Austin. According to court documents, Benson refused to submit to a field sobriety test and could not recite the alphabet from G to Z nor count past the number 3. Benson was released on the same day after posting bond.

== Death and legacy ==
On August 17, 2019, Benson and female passenger Aamna Najam were killed when his motorcycle collided with a minivan on RM 2222 in Austin, Texas. Benson and Najam were pronounced dead at the scene, but the two occupants of the minivan were not seriously injured.

On the second anniversary of Benson's death, his family and the Austin school district launched a mentorship program in his honor at Gus Garcia Young Men's Leadership Academy. In 2026, a statue of Benson during his high school years was placed outside Astound Broadband Stadium in his hometown of Midland.

== See also ==
- List of NCAA Division I FBS running backs with at least 50 career rushing touchdowns
- List of NCAA major college football yearly scoring leaders
- List of Texas Longhorns football All-Americans
- List of Chicago Bears first-round draft picks
- List of people diagnosed with coeliac disease
