= David Ball (wide receiver) =

American gridiron football player (born 1984)

No. 18
- Position: Wide receiver

Personal information
- Born: June 6, 1984 (age 42); Berlin, Vermont, U.S.
- Listed height: 6 ft 1 in (1.85 m)
- Listed weight: 201 lb (91 kg)

Career information
- High school: Spaulding (Barre, Vermont)
- College: New Hampshire
- NFL draft: 2007: undrafted

Career history
- Chicago Bears (2007)*; New York Jets (2007); Montreal Alouettes (2008)*; Hamilton Tiger-Cats (2009−2010); Winnipeg Blue Bombers (2010)*; Hamilton Tiger-Cats (2010)*; Pittsburgh Power (2011); Erie Explosion (2011); Philadelphia Eagles (2013)*
- * Offseason or practice squad member only

Career AFL statistics
- Receptions: 1
- Receiving yards: 20
- Total tackles: 1
- Stats at ArenaFan.com
- Stats at CFL.ca (archive)

David Ball (born June 6, 1984) is an American former professional football wide receiver. He was signed by the Chicago Bears as an undrafted free agent in 2007. He played college football for the New Hampshire Wildcats, and held the I-AA record for touchdown receptions until 2016 (broken by Cooper Kupp).

Ball was also a member of the New York Jets, Montreal Alouettes, Hamilton Tiger-Cats, Winnipeg Blue Bombers, Pittsburgh Power, Erie Explosion, and Philadelphia Eagles.

== Early life ==
Ball attended Spaulding High School in Barre, VT and played football there. Ball attended Worcester Academy for a year, where he played with future NFL quarterback Colt Brennan, and was a post-graduate student and a letterman in football, basketball, and track. He was named the school's Athlete of the Year, won the NEPSAC Class A title in basketball, and set the record for the NEPSAC Class B Тrack and Field Championship in the High Jump, with a jump of 6 feet 9 inches at Worcester.

== College career ==
Ball broke the Division I-AA record for touchdown receptions, previously set by Jerry Rice at Mississippi Valley State University, on October 14, 2006, versus the University of Richmond, and went on to score seven more touchdowns for a new record of 58 touchdowns. He also approached two other I-AA receiving records set by Rice, and has been nicknamed "White Rice." (Several of Ball's records have since been broken by Cooper Kupp at Eastern Washington):

- Third most career receiving yards: 4,655 (Rice had 4,693 | Kupp - 6,464)
- Most games with at least 100 receiving yards: 27 (Rice had 24 | Kupp - 31)
- Second most career touchdown receptions: 58 in 50 games (Rice had 50 in 41 games | Kupp has since surpassed Ball with 73 in 52 games)

== Professional career ==
=== Chicago Bears ===
Although a standout at the University of New Hampshire, Ball was cited by NFL scouts as not possessing an NFL-caliber combination of size and speed, as well as facing poor competition at the D-IAA level. He subsequently went undrafted in the 2007 NFL draft. He signed with the Bears as a free agent, joining his classmate, Corey Graham who was drafted by Chicago in the fifth round.

During 2007 pre-season play, Ball had 6 receptions for a total gain of 64 yards.

Ball was released by Chicago on September 1, 2007, in order to reach the NFL's mandatory 53-man roster limit. He was re-signed to the Bears' practice squad on September 2, 2007. Ball was released from the practice squad on September 18, 2007, to make room for P. J. Pope on the practice squad. He was re-signed to the practice squad on September 21, 2007, and dropped again on September 24, 2007, to make room for Josh Gattis.

=== New York Jets ===
On November 28, 2007, Ball was signed to the New York Jets practice squad, replacing cornerback Manny Collins.

For their December 30, 2007 game against the Kansas City Chiefs, the New York Jets activated Ball to their game roster for the first time in Ball's career, but he did not appear in the game.

In a pre-season game on August 28, 2008, he had two receptions for a total of 15 yards including a touchdown, with the Jets winning over Philadelphia, 27–20.

On August 31, Ball was cut by the Jets in the final preseason cuts.

=== Montreal Alouettes ===
On September 10, 2008, David Ball joined the Montreal Alouettes, two days after his college quarterback, Ricky Santos, left them. He left the Alouettes on October 22, 2008.

=== Hamilton Tiger-Cats (first stint) ===
Ball signed with the Hamilton Tiger-Cats on April 9, 2009. He was released on April 28, 2010.

=== Winnipeg Blue Bombers ===
The Blue Bombers signed Ball on June 7, 2010. He was released on June 30, 2010.

=== Hamilton Tiger-Cats (second stint) ===
The Tiger-Cats re-signed Ball on August 11, 2010, to a practice roster agreement.

=== Pittsburgh Power ===
The Power signed Ball on November 22, 2010. He was placed on the Physically Unable to Perform list on March 2, 2011. He was activated on March 24, 2011.

=== Erie Explosion ===
After being cut by the Power, Ball finished the 2011 indoor season with the Erie Explosion of the Southern Indoor Football League.

=== Philadelphia Eagles ===
Ball was signed by the Philadelphia Eagles on July 27, 2013. On August 6, 2013, he was released by the Eagles.

== Motivational speaker ==
David Ball created D.R.E.A.M. Sports Productions LLC to speak to groups about making a dream become reality.
