= Trumaine McBride =

American football player (born 1985)

No. 26, 23, 34, 38
- Position: Cornerback

Personal information
- Born: September 24, 1985 (age 41); Clarksdale, Mississippi, U.S.
- Listed height: 5 ft 9 in (1.75 m)
- Listed weight: 185 lb (84 kg)

Career information
- High school: Clarksdale
- College: Ole Miss
- NFL draft: 2007: 7th round, 221st overall pick

Career history
- Chicago Bears (2007−2009); Arizona Cardinals (2010); New Orleans Saints (2011)*; Jacksonville Jaguars (2011); New York Giants (2013−2015)
- * Offseason or practice squad member only

Career NFL statistics
- Total tackles: 152
- Forced fumbles: 5
- Pass deflections: 28
- Interceptions: 7
- Defensive touchdowns: 1
- Stats at Pro Football Reference

Trumaine McBride (born September 24, 1985) is an American former professional football player who was a cornerback in the National Football League (NFL). He was selected by the Chicago Bears in the seventh round of the 2007 NFL draft. He was also a member of the Arizona Cardinals, New Orleans Saints, Jacksonville Jaguars, and New York Giants. He played college football for the Ole Miss Rebels.

== Early life ==
McBride attended Clarksdale High School in Clarksdale, Mississippi and was a student and letterman in football. In football, he was selected All-America and to the Top 300 list by PrepStar magazine.

== Professional career ==
=== Chicago Bears ===
The Chicago Bears selected McBride in the seventh round of the 2007 NFL draft with the 221st overall pick. He served as one of the team's reserve cornerbacks, behind Nathan Vasher and Charles Tillman, who had both been signed to multi-year contracts over the summer. McBride received playing time during week four, after Vasher sustained a groin injury that sidelined him for much of the 2007 season. McBride earned a starting role during week seven, after he established himself as one of the most consistent members of the Bears' already injury-depleted secondary.

After suffering a knee sprain in the 2009 season opener against the Green Bay Packers, McBride was waived/injured by the Bears and subsequently placed on injured reserve.

=== Arizona Cardinals ===
On January 22, 2010 McBride signed a one-year contract with the Arizona Cardinals.

=== Jacksonville Jaguars ===
On April 27, 2012, McBride was released by the Jaguars.

McBride re-signed with the Jaguars on July 30, 2012 and was later released on August 31.

=== New York Giants ===
He signed with the Giants on January 4, 2013.

On March 12, 2014, McBride was re-signed by the New York Giants.

== NFL career statistics ==
Legend
**Bold**	Career high

Year	Team	Games		Tackles					Interceptions					Fumbles			
Year	Team	GP	GS	Cmb	Solo	Ast	Sck	TFL	Int	Yds	TD	Lng	PD	FF	FR	Yds	TD
2007	CHI	**16**	9	**41**	**35**	**6**	0.0	0	0	0	0	0	5	1	**1**	0	0
2008	CHI	**16**	1	11	10	1	0.0	1	1	0	0	0	2	0	0	0	0
2009	CHI	1	0	0	0	0	0.0	0	0	0	0	0	0	0	0	0	0
2010	ARI	14	0	16	13	3	0.0	0	0	0	0	0	1	0	0	0	0
2011	JAX	1	0	0	0	0	0.0	0	0	0	0	0	0	0	0	0	0
2013	NYG	15	**10**	37	32	5	0.0	1	2	17	0	17	**15**	1	0	0	0
2014	NYG	6	1	21	19	2	**1.0**	**2**	1	11	0	11	1	**2**	**1**	0	0
2015	NYG	15	0	26	23	3	0.0	1	**3**	**84**	**1**	**63**	4	1	0	0	0
		84	21	152	132	20	1.0	5	7	112	1	63	28	5	2	0	0
