= Michael Okwo =

British-born American football player (born 1985)

No. 62, 53
- Position: Linebacker

Personal information
- Born: January 24, 1985 (age 41); Manchester, England
- Listed height: 5 ft 11 in (1.80 m)
- Listed weight: 235 lb (107 kg)

Career information
- College: Stanford
- NFL draft: 2007: 3rd round, 94th overall pick

Awards and highlights
- 2× First-team All-Pac-10 (2004, 2006)

Michael K. Okwo (born January 24, 1985) is a British-American former professional football linebacker. He was selected by the Chicago Bears in the third round of the 2007 NFL draft. He played college football for the Stanford Cardinal.

== Early life ==
Born in Manchester, England, Okwo graduated from Mira Costa High School in Manhattan Beach, California in 2003.
