= Kevin Payne (American football) =

American football player (born 1983)

No. 44
- Position: Safety

Personal information
- Born: December 5, 1983 (age 42); El Dorado, Arkansas, U.S.
- Listed height: 6 ft 0 in (1.83 m)
- Listed weight: 215 lb (98 kg)

Career information
- High school: Junction City (Junction City, Arkansas)
- College: UL Monroe (2003–2006)
- NFL draft: 2007: 5th round, 167th overall pick

Career history
- Chicago Bears (2007–2009); St. Louis Rams (2010)*; Carolina Panthers (2011)*
- * Offseason or practice squad member only

Awards and highlights
- Sun Belt Freshman of the Year (2003); First-team All-Sun Belt (2006); 2× Second-team All-Sun Belt (2003, 2005)

Career NFL statistics
- Total tackles: 137
- Sacks: 1
- Pass deflections: 12
- Interceptions: 4
- Stats at Pro Football Reference

Kevin Payne (born December 5, 1983) is an American former professional football player who was a safety in the National Football League (NFL). He played college football for the UL Monroe Warhawks and was selected by the Chicago Bears in the fifth round of the 2007 NFL draft.

He was also a member of the St. Louis Rams and Carolina Panthers.

== Early life ==
Payne's attended Junction City High School in Union County, Arkansas where he was a three-sport athlete. His senior year he rushed for 26 touchdowns and 1,700 yard as a running back. Defensively, he had 104 tackles with 1 interception and 1 fumble recovery as a linebacker. Both defensive turnovers were returned for touchdowns. In addition to playing football, Payne played basketball and baseball. On the basketball court, he averaged 18 points a game as a senior. As a hitter in baseball, he compiled a 0.463 batting average with 8 home runs.

== College career ==
After graduating from high school, Payne enrolled at the University of Louisiana at Monroe, joining the football team as a running back. University of Louisiana at Monroe was the only Division 1 school to offer Payne. Payne has a strong freshman year for the ULM Warhawks, rushing for 6 rushing touchdowns and 976 yards on 248 carries. He was also effective in the passing game, with 3 receiving touchdowns and 488 yards on 41 receptions. His efforts earned him the “Sun Belt Conference Freshman of the Year” title.

Payne struggled in his sophomore year as a running back while dealing with injuries. At the start of his third year for the ULM Warhawks, Payne was moved to safety. Despite never playing safety before, Payne performed well in camp and was named the starting Strong Safety for his Junior season. He posted 86 tackles with 7 pass deflections and 2 interceptions. He was named 2nd Team All Conference. Payne was once again named the starting Strong Safety his senior year, where he posted 98 tackles, 1 sack, and 4 interceptions. He was also the team's punter his senior year, with 1826 punting yards on 45 punts, for an average of 40.6 yards. For his senior year efforts, Payne was named 1st Team All Conference and 1st Team All Louisiana.

== Professional career ==
=== Pre-draft ===
Pre-draft measurables
Height	Weight	40-yard dash	10-yard split	20-yard split	20-yard shuttle	Three-cone drill	Vertical jump	Broad jump	Bench press	Wonderlic
6 ft 0 1/4 in (1.84 m)	220 lb (100 kg)	4.53 s	1.54 s	2.61 s	4.30 s	7.00 s	35 in (0.89 m)	9 ft 0 in (2.74 m)	20 reps	x
All values from NFL Combine and La-Monroe Pro day.

=== Chicago Bears ===
Payne was selected by the Chicago Bears in the fifth round (167th overall) in the 2007 NFL draft. Payne would be named the starter for the 4th game of the season against the Detroit Lions. He suffered a broken arm in the 2nd quarter, which required surgery. He was placed on injured reserve, ending his rookie season.

Payne was named the starting Strong Safety in his 2nd year with the Bears. He finished the season with 88 tackles and 4 interceptions (which lead the team) in 16 games.

Payne was again named the starting Strong Safety in 2009, but struggled with injuries throughout the year. He finished the season with 46 tackles and 5 pass deflections in 13 games.

=== St. Louis Rams ===
On April 28, 2010, Payne was traded to the St. Louis Rams for an undisclosed draft pick in the 2011 NFL draft. Payne suffered a season-ending injury in the final preseason game against the Baltimore Ravens, tearing his PCL. The Rams placed Payne on injured reserve, ending his season.

=== Carolina Panthers ===
On July 29, 2011, Payne was signed as a free agent by the Carolina Panthers to a one-year deal. He suffered a concussion in the first game of the preseason against the New York Giants, causing him to miss the next two presseaon games. He returned in the final preseason game, playing against the Pittsburgh Steelers. He was released on September 4.

== NFL career statistics ==
Legend
**Bold**	Career high

Year	Team	Games		Tackles					Interceptions					Fumbles			
Year	Team	GP	GS	Cmb	Solo	Ast	Sck	TFL	Int	Yds	TD	Lng	PD	FF	FR	Yds	TD
2007	CHI	3	1	2	1	1	0.0	0	0	0	0	0	0	0	0	0	0
2008	CHI	**16**	**16**	**89**	**74**	**15**	**1.0**	**3**	**4**	**147**	0	**50**	**7**	0	0	0	0
2009	CHI	13	5	46	39	7	0.0	0	0	0	0	0	5	0	0	0	0
		32	22	137	114	23	1.0	3	4	147	0	50	12	0	0	0	0
