= Jerry Angelo =

American football executive (born 1949)

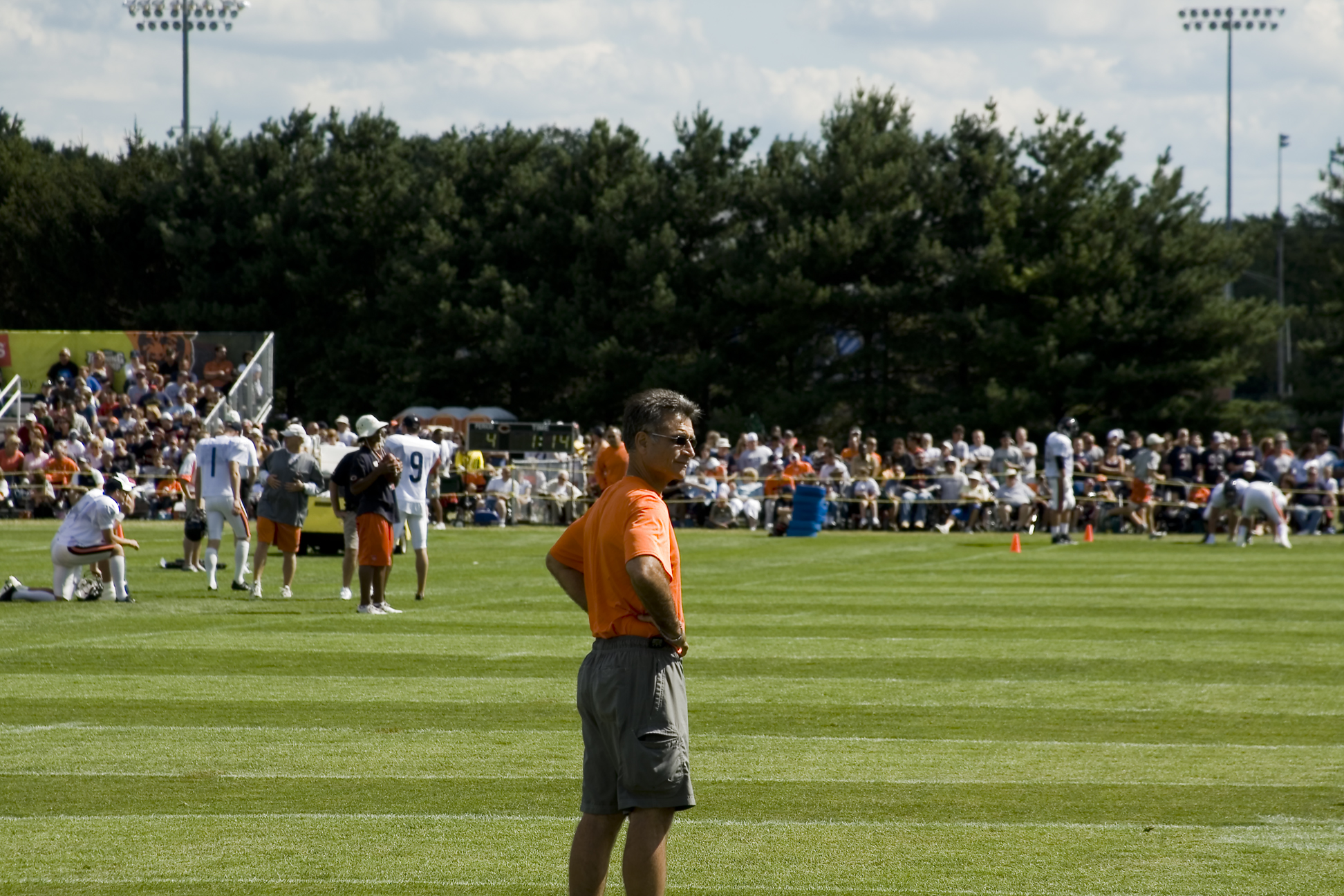
- Angelo at Chicago Bears training camp in 2008

Personal information
- Born: 1949 (age 76–77)

Career information
- College: Miami (Ohio)

Career history

Coaching
- Colorado State (1972) Defensive line coach; University of Tampa (1973–1974) Defensive line coach; Syracuse (1975–1979) Defensive line coach; Dallas Cowboys (1980) Scout; Calgary Stampeders (1981) Linebackers coach; New York Giants (1982–1986) Scout

Operations
- Tampa Bay Buccaneers (1987–2000) Director of player personnel; Chicago Bears (2001–2011) General manager
- Executive profile at Pro Football Reference

Jerry Angelo (born c. 1949) is an American former football executive who was the general manager for the National Football League's Chicago Bears from 2001 to 2011. Prior to joining the Bears, Angelo spent 14 years overseeing Tampa Bay Buccaneers' scouting department as their director of player personnel. Angelo graduated from Miami University in 1971.

== Early career ==
Angelo began his career in the NFL as a scout for both the New York Giants and the Dallas Cowboys in the early 1980s. Four years later he moved on to the Tampa Bay Buccaneers, a team that had experienced brief success. An expansion team established in 1976, the Buccaneers lost the 1979 NFC Championship Game to the Los Angeles Rams. What followed were a chaotic series of player tragedies and setbacks that sent the team into a slump. A succession of coaches and numerous roster changes failed to revive the team throughout the 1980s. Angelo was associated with the appearance of front office divisions and management mistakes. By the late 1990s his 14-year tenure in Tampa Bay was perceived as successful, as the Buccaneers made the playoffs three times from 1997 to 2000. With new ownership of the franchise, Angelo moved on to the Chicago Bears.

== Chicago Bears ==
Angelo became the Chicago Bears' general manager in 2001.

After firing Dick Jauron, Angelo sought a new coach. The short list was Nick Saban, Russ Grimm, and Lovie Smith. Nick Saban was the frontrunner, but wanted the GM powers Angelo just acquired. Saban went on to a short tenure with the Miami Dolphins prior to returning to college football. Russ Grimm was the second choice but was not hired.

Lovie Smith was hired by Angelo as the coach of the Chicago Bears in 2004. The Bears went from 5–11 in 2004, to 11–6 in 2005 (including a playoff loss to the Carolina Panthers) to a team in 2006 that went 15–4 after losing Super Bowl XLI to the Indianapolis Colts. Angelo was ranked as the eighth best general manager in professional sports in February 2007.

Following the 2007 Super Bowl run, the Bears were mired in player personnel controversies. First, many players, media and fans were upset that head coach Lovie Smith was not given a contract extension, despite being the lowest paid head coach in the NFL and taking his team to the Super Bowl. The Bears eventually relented, granting Smith a 4-year extension after at times bitter negotiations. Then, Angelo traded his leading rusher and locker room favorite, Thomas Jones, plus the Bears 2nd round draft pick, for the Jets' second round draft pick. Further damping the Bears off-season was a prolonged contract battle with star linebacker Lance Briggs, who eventually had the franchise tag placed on him.

=== 2007 ===
The 2007 season saw the Bears go 7–9 and miss the playoffs. Angelo entered the offseason with the mentality that "free agency begins at home." Rather than pursuing the league's top free agents, Angelo focused the team's resources on securing players that were already members of the team, including Lance Briggs, Alex Brown, Tommie Harris, Kyle Orton, Rex Grossman, and Devin Hester. He also chose to part with running back Cedric Benson, and replaced him with Matt Forte, whom the team drafted out of Tulane with the 44th overall pick of the 2008 NFL draft.

=== 2008 ===
The Bears drafted Chris Williams, a left offensive tackle from Vanderbilt University with the fourteenth overall pick of the 2008 NFL draft. On July 24, 2008, the second day of the Bears Training Camp, Williams was forced to leave practice due to back spasms. On August 7, 2008, Williams underwent surgery to repair a herniated disk in his back. The controversy began when on August 24, 2008, it became known that Bears doctors knew Williams had a herniated disk in his back prior to drafting him, yet took an unwise and risky gamble and decided to draft him anyway. Williams eventually began playing with the Bears in November, but received a limited role.

The 2008 Chicago Bears finished with a 9–7 record, and missed the playoffs after losing their season finale to the Houston Texans. After the season conclusion, Angelo parted with many of the team's defensive coaches, and hired Rod Marinelli. He also commented on the team's need to acquire a stable quarterback, dismissing rumors that Kyle Orton was the franchise's long-term solution. In an interview in January 2009, he stated, “It’s all about the quarterback... You don’t win because of wide receivers. You don’t win because of running backs. You win because of the quarterback. We have to get that position stabilized. We’re fixated on that.”

=== 2009 ===
In March 2009, Angelo, along with several other NFL teams, expressed interest in acquiring Pro Bowl quarterback Jay Cutler from the Denver Broncos. Cutler, who had spent three years with Denver, requested to be traded after head coach Josh McDaniels considered replacing him with Matt Cassel. On April 2, Angelo made one of the biggest trades in the franchise's history by trading Kyle Orton, the Bears' first and third-round selections in 2009, and first-round pick in 2010 for Cutler, plus a fifth round pick. On the same day, the Bears also signed seven-time Pro Bowl tackle Orlando Pace. Despite the high-profile trades, the Bears went 7-9 and again missed the playoffs. The Bears held a press-conference after the season to explain the team's future direction. Ted Phillips, the Bears president, confirmed that neither Angelo nor Lovie Smith would be dismissed for the team's disappointing finish.

=== 2010 ===
A clause in the 2006 collective bargaining agreement with the NFL established that there would be no salary cap in 2010. Thus, teams would be able to spend as much money as they wanted towards their players' salaries without having to worry about penalties or restrictions. On the first day of free agency, the Bears signed Pro Bowl defensive end Julius Peppers, running back Chester Taylor, and tight end Brandon Manumaleuna. Angelo hired Mike Martz to replace Ron Turner as the Bears offensive coordinator, and promoted defensive line coach Rod Marinelli to defensive coordinator.

=== 2011 ===
Angelo was fired by the Bears on January 3, 2012. The reason for his firing was due to a combination of poor drafting and questionable free agent signings, with the team stating they wanted to "close a talent gap" to stay competitive with the rival Green Bay Packers and Detroit Lions in the NFC North. He left with a 95–81 record as the Bears' general manager. He was succeeded by Phil Emery on January 29, 2012.

== Domestic abuse comments ==
In an October 2014 USA Today interview, Angelo said that during his years in professional football, he and other executives overlooked "hundreds and hundreds" of instances domestic violence. The Chicago Bears quickly released a statement, "We were surprised by Jerry's comments and do not know what he is referring to." The newspaper stands by the quote as attributed. Angelo later told Comcast SportsNet Chicago that his words were taken out of context.
