= Corey Graham =

American football player (born 1985)

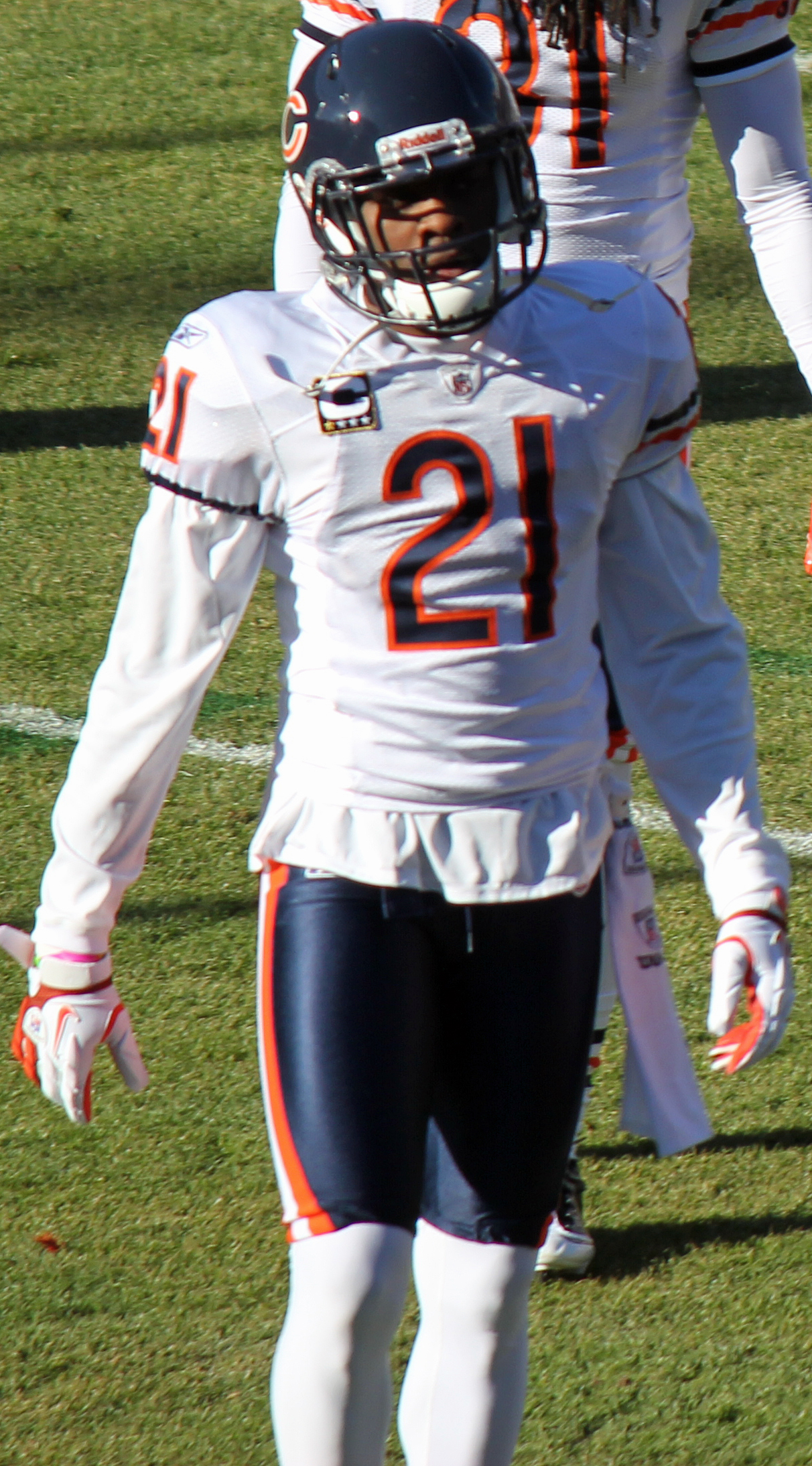
- Graham with the Chicago Bears in 2011

No. 21, 24, 20
- Positions: Safety, cornerback

Personal information
- Born: July 25, 1985 (age 41); Buffalo, New York, U.S.
- Listed height: 6 ft 0 in (1.83 m)
- Listed weight: 196 lb (89 kg)

Career information
- High school: Turner-Carroll (Buffalo, New York)
- College: New Hampshire (2003–2006)
- NFL draft: 2007: 5th round, 168th overall pick

Career history
- Chicago Bears (2007–2011); Baltimore Ravens (2012–2013); Buffalo Bills (2014–2016); Philadelphia Eagles (2017–2018)

Awards and highlights
- 2× Super Bowl champion (XLVII, LII); Pro Bowl (2011); PFWA All-Rookie Team (2007)

Career NFL statistics
- Total tackles: 707
- Sacks: 3.0
- Forced fumbles: 3
- Fumble recoveries: 6
- Interceptions: 18
- Defensive touchdowns: 1
- Stats at Pro Football Reference

Corey Dewayne Graham (born July 25, 1985) is an American former professional football player who played safety and cornerback in the National Football League (NFL). He played college football for the New Hampshire Wildcats and was selected by the Chicago Bears in the fifth round of the 2007 NFL draft. He also played for the Baltimore Ravens, Buffalo Bills, and Philadelphia Eagles. Graham was a once Pro Bowl selection and two-time Super Bowl champion.

== Early career ==
Graham was born in Buffalo, NY and played football at Turner-Carroll High School. By the time he graduated in 2003, he was a standout player on both sides earned numerous accolades including nomination for the Connolly Cup and All-Western New York Honors.

== College career ==
Graham attended the University of New Hampshire, where he played for the New Hampshire Wildcats football team. He later earned Master of Business Administration from Kelley School of Business at Indiana University Bloomington.

== Professional career ==
Pre-draft measurables
Height	Weight	40-yard dash	Bench press
6 ft 0 in (1.83 m)	195 lb (88 kg)	4.42 s	10 reps
All values from NFL Combine

=== Chicago Bears ===
The Chicago Bears selected Graham in the fifth round (168th overall) of the 2007 NFL draft. He was the 17th cornerback drafted in 2007.

On May 22, 2007, the Chicago Bears signed Graham to a four-year, $1.81 million contract that included a signing bonus of $149,500.

In 2008, Graham started at cornerback alongside longtime Bear Charles Tillman. Graham registered his first career interception on October 19, 2008, off of Minnesota Vikings quarterback Gus Frerotte. Graham also recorded 91 tackles in the 2008 season.

Graham was selected to his first Pro Bowl in 2011 after a season in which he recorded 16 total tackles, deflected three passes, forced a fumble, and caught three interceptions.

=== Baltimore Ravens ===
Graham signed with the Baltimore Ravens on March 23, 2012. Graham said that upon signing with the Ravens, he looked to see more time on defense, as well as continuing his solid special teams play.

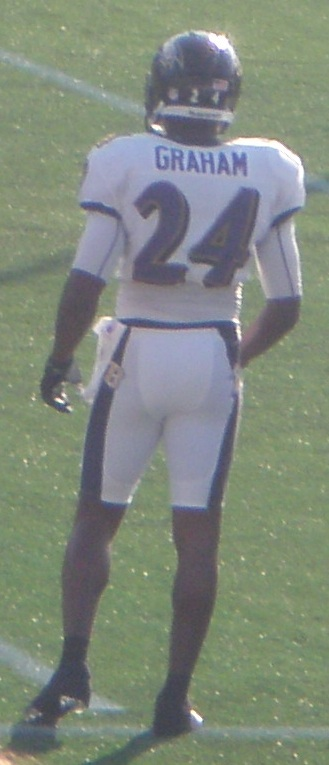
Graham at Navy–Marine Corps Memorial Stadium in 2012.

Graham had a limited role on defense at first, but injuries to Lardarius Webb and Jimmy Smith helped earn him more playing time.

Graham was named the CBS player of the game for the Baltimore Ravens' 2012 Divisional round playoff game against the top seeded Denver Broncos. In this game, Graham intercepted two Peyton Manning passes and made 8 tackles. Graham returned his first interception of the game 39 yards for a touchdown, giving the Ravens a 14–7 lead midway through the first quarter. Graham's second interception of the game occurred in overtime and led to a Ravens game-winning field goal, advancing the team to the AFC championship game. The Ravens entered the game as 9.5 point underdogs, but won the game in double overtime, 38–35, thanks in part to Graham's performance. Graham would call joining the Ravens the second best decision of his life, behind marrying his wife. Graham earned his first Super Bowl ring on February 3, 2013, when the Ravens defeated the San Francisco 49ers in Super Bowl XLVII.

=== Buffalo Bills ===
On March 12, 2014, Graham signed a four-year, $16 million contract with the Buffalo Bills. He contributed as a cornerback and on special teams during his first season on the team before being moved to the starting safety position under head coach Rex Ryan.

On March 10, 2017, Graham was released by the Bills after the team signed Micah Hyde and Jordan Poyer.

=== Philadelphia Eagles ===
On August 3, 2017, Graham signed a one-year contract with the Philadelphia Eagles reuniting him with former teammates Torrey Smith and Dannell Ellerbe. Graham won his second Super Bowl ring when the Eagles defeated the New England Patriots 41-33 in Super Bowl LII with Graham recording five tackles. Coincidentally, both that game and the other Super Bowl he was part of the winning team on, XLVII, were two of only three Super Bowls in NFL history where both teams recorded at least 30 points, the other being XIII between the Cowboys and Steelers.

On August 5, 2018, Graham re-signed with the Eagles on a one-year deal.

== NFL career statistics ==
Legend
**Bold**	Career high

=== Regular season ===
Year	Team	Games		Tackles					Interceptions					Fumbles			
Year	Team	GP	GS	Cmb	Solo	Ast	Sck	TFL	Int	Yds	TD	Lng	PD	FF	FR	Yds	TD
2007	CHI	13	0	15	13	2	0.0	0	0	0	0	0	0	0	0	0	0
2008	CHI	**16**	9	90	76	14	0.0	3	1	6	0	6	8	**1**	1	0	0
2009	CHI	**16**	1	35	31	4	0.0	0	0	0	0	0	1	0	0	0	0
2010	CHI	**16**	0	23	22	1	0.0	0	0	0	0	0	0	0	0	0	0
2011	CHI	**16**	0	18	15	3	0.0	0	3	11	0	10	3	0	0	0	0
2012	BAL	**16**	8	60	42	18	0.0	1	2	20	0	20	8	**1**	0	0	0
2013	BAL	**16**	5	74	56	18	**1.0**	**5**	**4**	28	0	28	12	**1**	0	0	0
2014	BUF	**16**	9	84	65	19	0.0	0	2	**75**	0	45	**16**	0	1	0	0
2015	BUF	**16**	**16**	**127**	**96**	**31**	**1.0**	4	2	60	**1**	44	4	0	**2**	**29**	0
2016	BUF	**16**	**16**	87	62	25	**1.0**	2	1	0	0	0	9	0	1	0	0
2017	PHI	14	1	38	34	4	0.0	1	2	73	0	**59**	4	0	0	0	0
2018	PHI	13	9	56	43	13	0.0	1	1	29	0	29	5	0	1	0	0
		184	74	707	555	152	3.0	17	18	302	1	59	70	3	6	29	0

=== Playoffs ===
Year	Team	Games		Tackles					Interceptions					Fumbles			
Year	Team	GP	GS	Cmb	Solo	Ast	Sck	TFL	Int	Yds	TD	Lng	PD	FF	FR	Yds	TD
2010	CHI	2	0	2	2	0	0.0	0	0	0	0	0	0	**1**	0	0	0
2012	BAL	**4**	**4**	**32**	**20**	**12**	**0.5**	0	**2**	**39**	**1**	**39**	**7**	0	0	0	0
2017	PHI	3	1	15	12	3	0.0	0	1	0	0	0	1	0	0	0	0
2018	PHI	2	2	8	6	2	0.0	0	0	0	0	0	0	0	0	0	0
		11	7	57	40	17	0.5	0	3	39	1	39	8	1	0	0	0
