= 2006 Chicago Bears season =

87th season in franchise history, 1st Super Bowl loss

- Owner: The McCaskey Family
- General manager: Jerry Angelo
- Head coach: Lovie Smith
- Offensive coordinator: Ron Turner
- Defensive coordinator: Ron Rivera
- Home stadium: Soldier Field

Results
- Record: 13–3
- Division place: 1st NFC North
- Playoffs: Won Divisional Playoffs (vs. Seahawks) 27–24 (OT); Won NFC Championship (vs. Saints) 39–14; Lost Super Bowl XLI (vs. Colts) 17–29
- All-Pros: 6: C Olin Kreutz; MLB Brian Urlacher; OLB Lance Briggs AP-2; KR+PR Devin Hester; K Robbie Gould; ST Brendon Ayanbadejo
- Pro Bowlers: 8: C Olin Kreutz; LG Ruben Brown; KR/PR Devin Hester; MLB Brian Urlacher; OLB Lance Briggs; OLB Brendon Ayanbadejo; DT Tommie Harris; K Robbie Gould

The 2006 season was the Chicago Bears' 87th season in the National Football League, and the third under head coach Lovie Smith. The team improved on their 11–5 record from 2005 and finished with a 13–3 record; the best in the NFC. The Bears retained their NFC North divisional title and advanced to their first NFC Championship Game in 18 years, defeating the New Orleans Saints on January 21, 2007, by a score of 39–14. The Bears played the Indianapolis Colts in Super Bowl XLI, where they lost 29–17. The team finished the 2006 NFL season tied for second in points scored, and third in points allowed.

Due to the NFL's scheduling formula the Bears played 6 intra-division games, posting a record of 5–1. Because of rotating cycle scheduling, the Bears matched up against all four teams in the AFC East (going 2–2) and NFC West (going 4–0). In the remaining games, the Bears played the NFC's other reigning division winners, the Tampa Bay Buccaneers and New York Giants, posting a record of 2–0. During the entire season, the Bears played 10 games at home, 8 games on the road, and 1 game at a neutral field for the Super Bowl. Including the playoffs and Super Bowl, the Bears finished with a record of 15–4.

Noteworthy football stories for the 2006 season were replacing retired cornerback and kick returner Jerry Azumah, the quarterback controversy between productive but inconsistent and potentially fragile Rex Grossman and veteran free agent Brian Griese, the record setting returns by Devin Hester, Bernard Berrian's breakout season, competition between the Bears' running backs (Cedric Benson and Thomas Jones), and 5th round draft pick Mark Anderson's 12 quarterback sacks as a rookie.

== Offseason ==
=== Draft ===
2006 Chicago Bears Draft
Round	Selection	Player	Position	College	Notes
2	42	Danieal Manning	S	Abilene Christian	
2	57	Devin Hester	CB	Miami	
3	73	Dusty Dvoracek	DT	Oklahoma	
4	120	Jamar Williams	LB	Arizona State	
5	159	Mark Anderson	DE	Alabama	
6	195	J.D. Runnels	FB	Oklahoma	
6	200	Tyler Reed	G	Penn State	

The Chicago Bears’ 2006 NFL draft picks drew much criticism from various Bears’ fans and local sports critics. After injuries plagued the Bears’ offensive depth chart, the team finished the 2005 NFL season ranked 31st in passing yardage per game. Many fans assumed that the Bears would draft a tight end or wide receiver to improve the offense. However, Jerry Angelo and Lovie Smith surprised the media by trading away the Bears’ first round draft pick, and drafting five defensive players. Devin Hester was drafted to fill the void left by former cornerback Jerry Azumah and punt returner Bobby Wade, while Danieal Manning could provide additional depth to the Bears’ secondary while also being potentially available for punt and kick returns, as his highest prospect grade came in kick returning. Additionally, Anderson and Dvoracek were drafted to add depth to the Bears’ defensive line.

=== Training camp ===
The preseason featured a brewing quarterback controversy when Rex Grossman struggled in his exhibition appearances and newly signed veteran back-up Brian Griese moved the second team offense freely.

The competition for the starting running back position went to Thomas Jones by default after sophomore running back Cedric Benson missed every preseason game with a shoulder injury inflicted in practice by Brian Urlacher and Mike Brown.

=== Preseason ===
Week	Date	Opponent	Result	Record	Venue	Recap
1	August 11	San Francisco 49ers	L 14–28	0–1	Monster Park	Recap
2	August 18	San Diego Chargers	W 24–3	1–1	Soldier Field	Recap
3	August 25	Arizona Cardinals	L 16–23	1–2	Soldier Field	Recap
4	August 31	Cleveland Browns	W 20–7	2–2	Cleveland Browns Stadium	Recap

== Uniform combinations ==
During the 2006 season, the Bears reintroduced three combinations of jerseys. During their week eight game against the San Francisco 49ers, the Bears wore special orange jerseys in the spirit of Halloween. They also wore all-white uniforms during their final two away games. Additionally, the Bears wore all-blue uniforms during their season finale against the Green Bay Packers.

== Schedule ==
Week	Date	Opponent	Result	Record	Game site
1	September 10	at Green Bay Packers	W 26–0	1–0	Lambeau Field
2	September 17	Detroit Lions	W 34–7	2–0	Soldier Field
3	September 24	at Minnesota Vikings	W 19–16	3–0	Hubert H. Humphrey Metrodome
4	October 1	Seattle Seahawks	W 37–6	4–0	Soldier Field
5	October 8	Buffalo Bills	W 40–7	5–0	Soldier Field
6	October 16	at Arizona Cardinals	W 24–23	6–0	University of Phoenix Stadium
7	Bye				
8	October 29	San Francisco 49ers	W 41–10	7–0	Soldier Field
9	November 5	Miami Dolphins	L 13–31	7–1	Soldier Field
10	November 12	at New York Giants	W 38–20	8–1	Giants Stadium
11	November 19	at New York Jets	W 10–0	9–1	Giants Stadium
12	November 26	at New England Patriots	L 13–17	9–2	Gillette Stadium
13	December 3	Minnesota Vikings	W 23–13	10–2	Soldier Field
14	December 11	at St. Louis Rams	W 42–27	11–2	Edward Jones Dome
15	December 17	Tampa Bay Buccaneers	W 34–31 (OT)	12–2	Soldier Field
16	December 24	at Detroit Lions	W 26–21	13–2	Ford Field
17	December 31	Green Bay Packers	L 7–26	13–3	Soldier Field

== Standings ==
NFC North
	W	L	T	PCT	DIV	CONF	PF	PA	STK
^{(1)} Chicago Bears	13	3	0	.813	5–1	11–1	427	255	L1
Green Bay Packers	8	8	0	.500	5–1	7–5	301	366	W4
Minnesota Vikings	6	10	0	.375	2–4	6–6	282	387	L3
Detroit Lions	3	13	0	.188	0–6	2–10	305	398	W1

== Game summaries ==
=== Week 1: at Green Bay Packers ===
Week One: Chicago Bears at Green Bay Packers – Game summary

Quarter	1	2	3	4	Total
Bears	7	9	3	7	26
Packers	0	0	0	0	0

at Lambeau Field, Green Bay, Wisconsin

- Date: September 10
- Game time: 3:15 p.m. CDT
- Game weather: Cloudy, 62 °F (17 °C)
- Game attendance: 70,918
- Referee: Tony Corrente
- TV announcers (Fox): Sam Rosen and Tim Ryan
- Box score

Game information

First quarter

- CHI – Bernard Berrian 49-yard pass from Rex Grossman (Robbie Gould kick), 12:05. Bears 7–0. Drive: 6 plays, 78 yards, 2:55.

Second quarter

- CHI – Robbie Gould 40-yard field goal, 13:44. Bears 10–0. Drive: 9 plays, 62 yards, 4:03.
- CHI – Robbie Gould 39-yard field goal, 6:29. Bears 13–0. Drive: 10 plays, 36 yards, 4:33.
- CHI – Robbie Gould 28-yard field goal, 4:38. Bears 16–0. Drive: 4 plays, 6 yards, 1:45.

Third quarter

- CHI – Robbie Gould 30-yard field goal, 1:47. Bears 19–0. Drive: 10 plays, 54 yards, 5:12.

Fourth quarter

- CHI – Devin Hester 84-yard punt return (Robbie Gould kick), 14:06. Bears 26–0.

Top passers

- CHI – Rex Grossman – 18/26, 262 yards, TD, INT
- GB – Brett Favre – 15/29, 170 yards, 2 INT

Top rushers

- CHI – Thomas Jones – 21 rushes, 63 yards
- GB – Ahman Green – 20 rushes, 110 yards

Top receivers

- CHI – Muhsin Muhammad – 6 receptions, 102 yards
- GB – Donald Driver – 7 receptions, 96 yards

The Bears began their season on a victorious note by defeating the Green Bay Packers. Widely considered one of the league's most storied rivalries, the Bears and Packers had previously met 28 times at Lambeau Field for a season opener. Notably, this was the first shutout ever for the Packers with quarterback Brett Favre at the helm.

=== Week 2: vs. Detroit Lions ===
Week Two: Detroit Lions at Chicago Bears – Game summary

Quarter	1	2	3	4	Total
Lions	0	0	7	0	7
Bears	10	14	7	3	34

at Soldier Field, Chicago, Illinois

- Date: September 17
- Game time: 12:00 p.m. CDT
- Game weather: Clear, 68 °F (20 °C)
- Game attendance: 62,181
- Referee: Mike Carey
- TV announcers (Fox): Sam Rosen and Tim Ryan
- Box score

Game information

First quarter

- CHI – John Gilmore 3-yard pass from Rex Grossman (Robbie Gould kick), 10:11. Bears 7–0. Drive: 2 plays, 3 yards, 0:38.
- CHI – Robbie Gould 32-yard field goal, 6:19. Bears 10–0. Drive: 7 plays, 61 yards, 3:16.

Second quarter

- CHI – Bernard Berrian 41-yard pass from Rex Grossman (Robbie Gould kick), 14:16. Bears 17–0. Drive: 6 plays, 72 yards, 1:54.
- CHI – Desmond Clark 31-yard pass from Rex Grossman (Robbie Gould kick), 3:36. Bears 24–0. Drive: 8 plays, 70 yards, 3:48.

Third quarter

- DET – Jon Kitna 1-yard run (Jason Hanson kick), 10:20. Bears 24–7. Drive: 10 plays, 86 yards, 4:40.
- CHI – John Gilmore 5-yard pass from Rex Grossman (Robbie Gould kick), 0:32. Bears 31–7. Drive: 11 plays, 75 yards, 5:45.

Fourth quarter

- CHI – Robbie Gould 45-yard field goal, 10:03. Bears 34–7. Drive: 7 plays, 32 yards, 3:24.

Top passers

- DET – Jon Kitna – 23/30, 230 yards
- CHI – Rex Grossman – 20/27, 289 yards, 4 TD

Top rushers

- DET – Kevin Jones – 12 rushes, 44 yards
- CHI – Thomas Jones – 21 rushes, 64 yards

Top receivers

- DET – Roy Williams – 6 receptions, 71 yards
- CHI – Bernard Berrian – 5 receptions, 89 yards, TD

"No defense can stop us. That's only in my opinion. We are our only defense. We will win this game. Y'all take that as a guarantee or what not, but we will win this game."
~Roy Williams

The Bears began a winning streak by defeating the Detroit Lions at Soldier Field. The game drew more media attention than usual when Roy Williams of the Detroit Lions guaranteed a victory against the Bears.

=== Week 3: at Minnesota Vikings ===
Week Three: Chicago Bears at Minnesota Vikings – Game summary

Quarter	1	2	3	4	Total
Bears	3	0	6	10	19
Vikings	3	3	0	10	16

at Hubert H. Humphrey Metrodome, Minneapolis, Minnesota

- Date: September 24
- Game time: 12:00 p.m. CDT
- Game weather: None (indoor stadium)
- Game attendance: 63,754
- Referee: Scott Green
- TV announcers (Fox): Dick Stockton, Daryl Johnston and Tony Siragusa
- Box score

Game information

First quarter

- MIN – Ryan Longwell 31-yard field goal, 10:49. Vikings 3–0. Drive: 8 plays, 68 yards, 4:11.
- CHI – Robbie Gould 41-yard field goal, 6:20. Tied 3–3. Drive: 9 plays, 30 yards, 4:29.

Second quarter

- MIN – Ryan Longwell 26-yard field goal, 1:08. Vikings 6–3. Drive: 7 plays, 14 yards, 3:24.

Third quarter

- CHI – Robbie Gould 24-yard field goal, 10:53. Tied 6–6. Drive: 9 plays, 64 yards, 4:07.
- CHI – Robbie Gould 31-yard field goal, 3:18. Bears 9–6. Drive: 9 plays, 48 yards, 5:14.

Fourth quarter

- MIN – Antoine Winfield Sr. 7-yard interception return (Ryan Longwell kick), 14:53. Vikings 13–9.
- CHI – Robbie Gould 49-yard field goal, 10:37. Vikings 13–12. Drive: 10 plays, 43 yards, 4:16.
- MIN – Ryan Longwell 41-yard field goal, 7:27. Vikings 16–12. Drive: 8 plays, 51 yards, 3:10.
- CHI – Rashied Davis 24-yard pass from Rex Grossman (Robbie Gould kick), 1:53. Bears 19–16. Drive: 5 plays, 37 yards, 1:32.

Top passers

- CHI – Rex Grossman – 23/41, 278 yards, TD, 2 INT
- MIN – Brad Johnson – 21/31, 194 yards

Top rushers

- CHI – Thomas Jones – 18 rushes, 54 yards
- MIN – Chester Taylor – 20 rushes, 74 yards

Top receivers

- CHI – Muhsin Muhammad – 9 receptions, 118 yards
- MIN – Travis Taylor – 6 receptions, 82 yards

The Bears offense was limited by a resurgent Minnesota Vikings defense, but fourth-quarter heroics from both the offense and defense resulted in a 19–16 victory.

=== Week 4: vs. Seattle Seahawks ===
Week Four: Seattle Seahawks at Chicago Bears – Game summary

Quarter	1	2	3	4	Total
Seahawks	3	3	0	0	6
Bears	7	13	14	3	37

at Soldier Field, Chicago, Illinois

- Date: October 1
- Game time: 7:15 p.m. CDT
- Game weather: Clear, 75 °F (24 °C)
- Game attendance: 62,225
- Referee: Terry McAulay
- TV announcers (NBC): Al Michaels and John Madden
- Box score

Game information

First quarter

- SEA – Josh Brown 23-yard field goal, 8:58. Seahawks 3–0. Drive: 7 plays, 57 yards, 2:09.
- CHI – Muhsin Muhammad 9-yard pass from Rex Grossman (Robbie Gould kick), 2:27. Bears 7–3. Drive: 12 plays, 69 yards, 6:31.

Second quarter

- CHI – Robbie Gould 36-yard field goal, 13:33. Bears 10–3. Drive: 8 plays, 60 yards, 2:33.
- CHI – Robbie Gould 20-yard field goal, 6:23. Bears 13–3. Drive: 9 plays, 34 yards, 3:33.
- CHI – Thomas Jones 3-yard run (Robbie Gould kick), 2:25. Bears 20–3. Drive: 5 plays, 37 yards, 2:22.
- SEA – Josh Brown 24-yard field goal, 0:27. Bears 20–6. Drive: 12 plays, 57 yards, 1:58.

Third quarter

- CHI – Thomas Jones 1-yard run (Robbie Gould kick), 10:05. Bears 27–6. Drive: 10 plays, 77 yards, 4:55.
- CHI – Bernard Berrian 40-yard pass from Rex Grossman (Robbie Gould kick), 0:51. Bears 34–6. Drive: 6 plays, 74 yards, 3:43.

Fourth quarter

- CHI – Robbie Gould 41-yard field goal, 7:43. Bears 37–6. Drive: 4 plays, 8 yards, 2:09.

Top passers

- SEA – Matt Hasselbeck – 16/35, 196 yards, 2 INT
- CHI – Rex Grossman – 17/31, 232 yards, 2 TD

Top rushers

- SEA – Maurice Morris – 11 rushes, 35 yards
- CHI – Thomas Jones – 24 rushes, 98 yards, 2 TD

Top receivers

- SEA – Darrell Jackson – 5 receptions, 62 yards
- CHI – Bernard Berrian – 3 receptions, 108 yards, TD

Taking advantage of an injured Shaun Alexander, who did not play, and playing very well on both sides of the ball, the Bears defeated the defending NFC Champion Seattle Seahawks at Soldier Field by a score of 37–6 on the Bears' first night game of the year.

=== Week 5: vs. Buffalo Bills ===
Week Five: Buffalo Bills at Chicago Bears – Game summary

Quarter	1	2	3	4	Total
Bills	0	0	0	7	7
Bears	6	21	3	10	40

at Soldier Field, Chicago, Illinois

- Date: October 8
- Game time: 12:00 p.m. CDT
- Game weather: Sunny, 73 °F (23 °C)
- Game attendance: 62,206
- Referee: Bill Carollo
- TV announcers (CBS): Jim Nantz and Phil Simms
- Box score

Game information

First quarter

- CHI – Robbie Gould 42-yard field goal, 9:07. Bears 3–0. Drive: 6 plays, 15 yards, 2:09.
- CHI – Robbie Gould 43-yard field goal, 3:43. Bears 6–0. Drive: 10 plays, 55 yards, 3:46.

Second quarter

- CHI – Bernard Berrian 8-yard pass from Rex Grossman (Robbie Gould kick), 13:01. Bears 13–0. Drive: 7 plays, 48 yards, 4:10.
- CHI – Cedric Benson 1-yard run (Robbie Gould kick), 8:30. Bears 20–0. Drive: 5 plays, 32 yards, 2:43.
- CHI – Rashied Davis 15-yard pass from Rex Grossman (Robbie Gould kick), 4:22. Bears 27–0. Drive: 4 plays, 70 yards, 1:52.

Third quarter

- CHI – Robbie Gould 32-yard field goal, 7:05. Bears 30–0. Drive: 9 plays, 26 yards, 4:18.

Fourth quarter

- CHI – Robbie Gould 41-yard field goal, 6:05. Bears 33–0. Drive: 14 plays, 47 yards, 8:39.
- CHI – Cedric Benson 1-yard run (Robbie Gould kick), 4:36. Bears 40–0. Drive: 3 plays, 15 yards, 1:19.
- BUF – Lee Evans 5-yard pass from J. P. Losman (Rian Lindell kick), 1:06. Bears 40–7. Drive: 6 plays, 42 yards, 1:38.

Top passers

- BUF – J. P. Losman – 14/27, 115 yards, TD, 3 INT
- CHI – Rex Grossman – 15/27, 182 yards, 2 TD

Top rushers

- BUF – Willis McGahee – 14 rushes, 50 yards
- CHI – Thomas Jones – 21 rushes, 110 yards

Top receivers

- BUF – Lee Evans – 9 receptions, 94 yards, TD
- CHI – Bernard Berrian – 4 receptions, 97 yards, TD

Week five marked the return of former Bears head coach Dick Jauron to Soldier Field. It would also be the second straight week in which the Bears defeated their opponent by more than 30 points.

=== Week 6: at Arizona Cardinals ===
Week Six: Chicago Bears at Arizona Cardinals

Quarter	1	2	3	4	Total
Bears	0	0	10	14	24
Cardinals	14	6	3	0	23

at University of Phoenix Stadium, Glendale, Arizona

- Date: October 16
- Game time: 6:30 p.m. MDT/7:30 p.m. CDT
- Game weather: Clear, 73 °F (23 °C) (retractable roof open)
- Game attendance: 63,977
- Referee: Jerome Boger
- TV announcers (ESPN): Mike Tirico, Joe Theismann, and Tony Kornheiser
- Box score

Game information

First quarter

- ARI – Bryant Johnson 11-yard pass from Matt Leinart (Neil Rackers kick), 7:06. Cardinals 7–0. Drive: 12 plays, 77 yards, 6:52.
- ARI – Anquan Boldin 26-yard pass from Matt Leinart (Neil Rackers kick), 0:54. Cardinals 14–0. Drive: 3 plays, 25 yards, 1:32.

Second quarter

- ARI – Neil Rackers 41-yard field goal, 4:15. Cardinals 17–0. Drive: 7 plays, 10 yards, 3:50.
- ARI – Neil Rackers 28-yard field goal, 0:00. Cardinals 20–0. Drive: 5 plays, 22 yards, 2:10.

Third quarter

- CHI – Robbie Gould 23-yard field goal, 7:22. Cardinals 20–3. Drive: 13 plays, 66 yards, 5:49.
- ARI – Neil Rackers 29-yard field goal, 1:47. Cardinals 23–3. Drive: 13 plays, 34 yards, 5:35.
- CHI – Mike Brown 3-yard fumble return (Robbie Gould kick), 0:02. Cardinals 23–10.

Fourth quarter

- CHI – Charles Tillman 40-yard fumble return (Robbie Gould kick), 5:00. Cardinals 23–17.
- CHI – Devin Hester 83-yard punt return (Robbie Gould kick), 2:58. Bears 24–23.

Top passers

- CHI – Rex Grossman – 14/37, 144 yards, 4 INT
- ARI – Matt Leinart – 24/42, 232 yards, 2 TD

Top rushers

- CHI – Thomas Jones – 11 rushes, 43 yards
- ARI – Edgerrin James – 36 rushes, 55 yards

Top receivers

- CHI – Desmond Clark – 4 receptions, 61 yards
- ARI – Anquan Bolden – 12 receptions, 136 yards, TD

"The Bears are who we thought they were, and that’s why we took the damn field. Now, if you want to crown them, then crown their ass! But, they are who we thought they were, and we let them off the hook!."
~Dennis Green

The Bears traveled to the newly opened University of Phoenix Stadium to play the Arizona Cardinals, their former cross-town rivals. While many expected the game a lop-sided affair in favor of the 5–0 Bears, the Cardinals led the Bears before stumbling in the game's last quarter. The game marked the Bears’ first Monday Night Football appearance since the 2003 NFL season, and second overall prime-time appearance of the season. The game started on an auspicious note for the Cardinals, as Rex Grossman faced a quick three and out after failing to connect to Bernard Berrian on a deep pass. The Cardinals responded offensively when rookie quarterback Matt Leinart threw two touchdowns in the first quarter. As Neil Rackers helped bolster the Cardinals lead with a set of field goals, Grossman continued to struggle and committed four turnovers in the first half alone. By half time, the Cardinals were leading the Bears by a score of 20–0, which was the largest deficit they had faced all season at that point.

The Bears finally got on the score board in the third quarter when Robbie Gould kicked a 23-yard field goal. However, Rackers responded again to boost the Cardinals lead back to twenty points. By the game's third quarter, many had assumed the Cardinals had grasped their second win of the season, and the undefeated Bears would be forced to face defeat. However, in the dying minutes of the third quarter, the Bears’ defense made a series of staunch defensive plays that allowed them to rally back.

First, rookie defensive end Mark Anderson sacked Leinart, causing him to fumble. The loose ball was picked up by Mike Brown, who returned it for a 3-yard touchdown. Later, Brian Urlacher stripped the ball from running back Edgerrin James, and Charles Tillman recovered the football and returned it for another touchdown. The Bears, now only trailing by six points, took the lead when rookie punt returner Devin Hester returned a punt for an 83-yard touchdown. The Cardinals had one final attempt to win the game, but Rackers missed a 40-yard field goal attempt, allowing the Bears to kneel the clock out. After the game's conclusion, Dennis Green, who was the Cardinal's coach at the time, threw his infamous "They are who we thought they were!" postgame conference. The rant became so popular, that it was featured in a Coors Light commercial the next season.

=== Week 7: Bye ===
Celebration of the Bears' improbable win over Arizona was tempered by the news that starting safety Mike Brown was lost for the season with torn ligaments in his foot. The rest of the team was able to work toward renewed good health for the San Francisco game.

=== Week 8: vs. San Francisco 49ers ===
Week Eight: San Francisco 49ers at Chicago Bears – Game summary

Quarter	1	2	3	4	Total
49ers	0	0	0	10	10
Bears	24	17	0	0	41

at Soldier Field, Chicago, Illinois

- Date: October 29
- Game time: 12:00 p.m. CST
- Game weather: Sunny, 55 °F (13 °C)
- Game attendance: 62,200
- Referee: Ron Winter
- TV announcers (Fox): Pat Summerall and Brian Baldinger
- Box score

Game information

First quarter

- CHI – Robbie Gould 43-yard field goal, 12:05. Bears 3–0. Drive: 8 plays, 41 yards, 2:55.
- CHI – Thomas Jones 7-yard run (Robbie Gould kick), 10:39. Bears 10–0. Drive: 3 plays, 15 yards, 1:18.
- CHI – Muhsin Muhammad 5-yard pass from Rex Grossman (Robbie Gould kick), 1:55. Bears 17–0. Drive: 6 plays, 41 yards, 2:50.
- CHI – Cedric Benson 1-yard run (Robbie Gould kick), 1:02. Bears 24–0. Drive: 2 plays, 13 yards, 0:38.

Second quarter

- CHI – Desmond Clark 1-yard pass from Rex Grossman (Robbie Gould kick), 10:33. Bears 31–0. Drive: 7 plays, 23 yards, 3:54.
- CHI – Robbie Gould 36-yard field goal, 3:15. Bears 34–0. Drive: 9 plays, 54 yards, 5:16.
- CHI – Desmond Clark 27-yard pass from Rex Grossman (Robbie Gould kick), 0:10. Bears 41–0. Drive: 4 plays, 70 yards, 1:02.

Third quarter

- No scoring plays

Fourth quarter

- SF – Joe Nedney 23-yard field goal, 11:35. Bears 41–3. Drive: 9 plays, 94 yards, 4:53.
- SF – Antonio Bryant 16-yard pass from Alex Smith (Joe Nedney kick), 6:49. Bears 41–10. Drive: 7 plays, 49 yards, 3:08.

Top passers

- SF – Alex Smith – 14/25, 135 yards, TD, 2 INT
- CHI – Rex Grossman – 23/29, 252 yards, 3 TD

Top rushers

- SF – Frank Gore – 12 rushes, 111 yards
- CHI – Thomas Jones – 23 rushes, 111 yards, TD

Top receivers

- SF – Antonio Bryant – 4 receptions, 44 yards, TD
- CHI – Desmond Clark – 6 receptions, 86 yards, 2 TD

Week 8 saw the Bears return to Soldier Field to play the San Francisco 49ers. Prior to the game, Lovie Smith announced that the Bears would don their alternative orange jerseys to commemorate the upcoming Halloween holiday, and asked Bear fans to wear orange clothing to create an “orange swarm” at Soldier Field. The Bears' 41 point first half tied the franchise record for most points scored in one half, the other game being the 1940 NFL Championship, where the Bears defeated the Washington Redskins 73–0.

=== Week 9: vs. Miami Dolphins ===
Week Nine: Miami Dolphins at Chicago Bears – Game summary

Quarter	1	2	3	4	Total
Dolphins	0	14	7	10	31
Bears	3	7	3	0	13

at Soldier Field, Chicago, Illinois

- Date: November 5
- Game time: 12:00 p.m. CST
- Game weather: Partly cloudy, 55 °F (13 °C)
- Game attendance: 62,206
- Referee: Peter Morelli
- TV announcers (CBS): Greg Gumbel and Dan Dierdorf
- Box score

Game information

First quarter

- CHI – Robbie Gould 38-yard field goal, 0:04. Bears 3–0. Drive: 14 plays, 69 yards, 6:41.

Second quarter

- MIA – Marty Booker 5-yard pass from Joey Harrington (Olindo Mare kick), 10:47. Dolphins 7–3. Drive: 10 plays, 28 yards, 1:25.
- MIA – Jason Taylor 20-yard interception return (Olindo Mare kick), 10:32. Dolphins 14–3.
- CHI – Muhsin Muhammad 30-yard pass from Rex Grossman (Robbie Gould kick), 1:57. Dolphins 14–10. Drive: 6 plays, 87 yards, 3:01.

Third quarter

- MIA – Wes Welker 6-yard pass from Joey Harrington (Olindo Mare kick), 13:13. Dolphins 21–10. Drive: 3 plays, 12 yards, 1:27.
- CHI – Robbie Gould 38-yard field goal, 1:02. Dolphins 21–13. Drive: 4 plays, 3 yards, 0:54.

Fourth quarter

- MIA – Chris Chambers 24-yard pass from Joey Harrington (Olindo Mare kick), 10:00. Dolphins 28–13. Drive: 1 play, 24 yards, 0:08.
- MIA – Olindo Mare 20-yard field goal, 1:09. Dolphins 31–13. Drive: 10 plays, 56 yards, 4:44.

Top passers

- MIA – Joey Harrington – 16/32, 137 yards, 3 TD, 2 INT
- CHI – Rex Grossman – 18/42, 210 yards, TD, 3 INT

Top rushers

- MIA – Ronnie Brown – 29 rushes, 157 yards
- CHI – Thomas Jones – 20 rushes, 69 yards

Top receivers

- MIA – Chris Chambers – 5 receptions, 58 yards, TD
- CHI – Justin Gage – 2 receptions, 51 yards

Week 9 saw the Bears take on the Joey Harrington-led Miami Dolphins and fall to 7–1 with their first loss of the season. Miami defensive end Jason Taylor recorded a sack, a forced fumble, and a 20-yard pick-six.

=== Week 10: at New York Giants ===
Week Ten: Chicago Bears at New York Giants – Game summary

Quarter	1	2	3	4	Total
Bears	3	7	14	14	38
Giants	7	6	7	0	20

at Giants Stadium, East Rutherford, New Jersey

- Date: November 12
- Game time: 7:15 p.m. CST/8:15 EST
- Game weather: Rain, 55 °F (13 °C)
- Game attendance: 78,641
- Referee: Ed Hochuli
- TV announcers (NBC): Al Michaels and John Madden
- Box score

Game information

First quarter

- NYG – Brandon Jacobs 1-yard run (Jay Feely kick), 9:55. Giants 7–0. Drive: 1 play, 1 yard, 0:04.
- CHI – Robbie Gould 49-yard field goal, 5:59. Giants 7–3. Drive: 4 plays, 14 yards, 1:00.

Second quarter

- NYG – Jay Feely 46-yard field goal, 13:25. Giants 10–3. Drive: 4 plays, 3 yards, 1:59.
- NYG – Jay Feely 40-yard field goal, 2:21. Giants 13–3. Drive: 6 plays, 19 yards, 3:56.
- CHI – Mark Bradley 29-yard pass from Rex Grossman (Robbie Gould kick), 0:35. Giants 13–10. Drive: 8 plays, 81 yards, 1:46.

Third quarter

- CHI – Muhsin Muhammad 10-yard pass from Rex Grossman (Robbie Gould kick), 8:20. Bears 17–13. Drive: 6 plays, 49 yards, 2:28.
- CHI – Desmond Clark 2-yard pass from Rex Grossman (Robbie Gould kick), 5:35. Bears 24–13. Drive: 4 plays, 21 yards, 1:48.
- NYG – Brandon Jacobs 8-yard run (Jay Feely kick), 3:26. Bears 24–20. Drive: 5 plays, 69 yards, 2:09.

Fourth quarter

- CHI – Devin Hester 108-yard field goal return (Robbie Gould kick), 11:20. Bears 31–20.
- CHI – Thomas Jones 2-yard run (Robbie Gould kick), 8:20. Bears 38–20. Drive: 4 plays, 46 yards, 2:33.

Top passers

- CHI – Rex Grossman – 18/30, 246 yards, 3 TD, INT
- NYG – Eli Manning – 14/32, 121 yards, 2 INT

Top rushers

- CHI – Thomas Jones – 30 rushes, 113 yards, TD
- NYG – Tiki Barber – 19 rushes, 141 yards

Top receivers

- CHI – Muhsin Muhammad – 7 receptions, 123 yards, TD
- NYG – Plaxico Burress – 4 receptions, 48 yards

The Bears traveled to Giants Stadium to face the New York Giants. The game was highly anticipated, as it was the first game in league history to benefit from the NFL's flexible scheduling. Furthermore, leading up to the game Giants receiver Plaxico Burress provided plenty of fodder for the Chicago media by calling the Bears’ cornerbacks “average”. Nevertheless, the Bears went on to beat the Giants by a score of 38–20. The win over the Giants allowed the Bears to hold their first-place ranking in the National Football Conference. Devin Hester was also able to tie a record 108-yard return for a touchdown shared by teammate Nathan Vasher.

=== Week 11: at New York Jets ===
Week Eleven: Chicago Bears at New York Jets – Game summary

Quarter	1	2	3	4	Total
Bears	0	0	3	7	10
Jets	0	0	0	0	0

at Giants Stadium, East Rutherford, New Jersey

- Date: November 19
- Game time: 12:00 p.m. CST/1:00 p.m. EST
- Game weather: Overcast, 47 °F (8 °C)
- Game attendance: 77,632
- Referee: Gene Steratore
- TV announcers (Fox): Joe Buck, Troy Aikman and Pam Oliver
- Box score

Game information

First quarter

- No scoring plays

Second quarter

- No scoring plays

Third quarter

- CHI – Robbie Gould 20-yard field goal, 10:39. Bears 3–0. Drive: 8 plays, 42 yards, 4:21.

Fourth quarter

- CHI – Mark Bradley 57-yard pass from Rex Grossman (Robbie Gould kick), 14:50. Bears 10–0. Drive: 2 plays, 61 yards, 0:41.

Top passers

- CHI – Rex Grossman – 11/22, 119 yards, TD
- NYJ – Chad Pennington – 19/35, 162 yards, 2 INT

Top rushers

- CHI – Thomas Jones – 23 rushes, 121 yards
- NYJ – Cedric Houston – 11 rushes, 50 yards

Top receivers

- CHI – Mark Bradley – 4 receptions, 80 yards, TD
- NYJ – Laveranues Coles – 8 receptions, 80 yards

For week eleven, the Chicago Bears returned to Giants Stadium to play the New York Jets. While the Bears managed to record their second shut-out win of the year, their offense struggled throughout the first half the game, and managed only ten points in the second half. The victory over the Jets marked the first time in two games that the Bears did not turn over the ball, and Robbie Gould had not failed to convert a field goal or extra point on the year.

=== Week 12: at New England Patriots ===
Week Twelve: Chicago Bears at New England Patriots – Game summary

Quarter	1	2	3	4	Total
Bears	0	3	0	10	13
Patriots	0	10	0	7	17

at Gillette Stadium, Foxboro, Massachusetts

- Date: November 26
- Game time: 3:15 p.m. CST/4:15 p.m. EST
- Game weather: Clear, 56 °F (13 °C)
- Game attendance: 68,756
- Referee: Walt Coleman
- TV announcers (Fox): Joe Buck, Troy Aikman and Pam Oliver
- Box score

Game information

First quarter

- No scoring plays

Second quarter

- NE – Laurence Maroney 1-yard run (Stephen Gostkowski kick), 9:07. Patriots 7–0. Drive: 11 plays, 92 yards, 5:05.
- CHI – Robbie Gould 46-yard field goal, 4:04. Patriots 7–3. Drive: 11 plays, 46 yards, 5:03.
- NE – Stephen Gostkowski 52-yard field goal, 0:01. Patriots 10–3. Drive: 9 plays, 63 yards, 1:43.

Third quarter

- No scoring plays

Fourth quarter

- CHI – Cedric Benson 2-yard run (Robbie Gould kick), 14:53. Tied 10–10. Drive: 4 plays, 53 yards, 1:14.
- NE – Benjamin Watson 2-yard pass from Tom Brady (Stephen Gostkowski kick), 8:22. Patriots 17–10. Drive: 11 plays, 73 yards, 6:31.
- CHI – Robbie Gould 32-yard field goal, 3:31. Patriots 17–13. Drive: 10 plays, 66 yards, 4:51.

Top passers

- CHI – Rex Grossman – 15/34, 176 yards, 3 INT
- NE – Tom Brady – 22/33, 267 yards, TD, 2 INT

Top rushers

- CHI – Thomas Jones – 23 rushes, 99 yards
- NE – Corey Dillon – 11 rushes, 40 yards

Top receivers

- CHI – Bernard Berrian – 5 receptions, 104 yards
- NE – Benjamin Watson – 6 receptions, 87 yards, TD

Following two consecutive wins at Giants Stadium, the Bears were to finish a three-game road trip at Gillette Stadium against the New England Patriots. Similar to the week nine confrontation with the Miami Dolphins, turnovers contributed to the Bears’ 17–13 loss against the Patriots. The opening two quarters were a story of turnovers in a Rex Grossman interception by Asante Samuel, a Benjamin Watson catch knocked into the hands of Charles Tillman, a blocked Bears field goal attempt, and fumbles by Laurence Maroney and Grossman. The third quarter saw a bizarre sequence of turnovers – first fumbles by both Watson and Reche Caldwell on the same play, followed by another Samuel interception of Grossman, and finally a second Tillman interception of Brady. Through three quarters the game was tied 10–10 before a drive where Brady faked out Brian Urlacher on a nine-yard run ended in a two-yard score to Watson. Turnovers then ended the game, with a Corey Dillon fumble followed by Samuel's third interception of Grossman. Samuel's three picks tied Roland James in Patriots history for three interceptions in one game.

=== Week 13: vs. Minnesota Vikings ===
Week Thirteen: Minnesota Vikings at Chicago Bears – Game summary

Quarter	1	2	3	4	Total
Vikings	0	3	3	7	13
Bears	0	7	14	2	23

at Soldier Field, Chicago, Illinois

- Date: December 3
- Game time: 12:00 p.m. CST
- Game weather: Sunny, 18 °F (−8 °C)
- Game attendance: 62,221
- Referee: Tony Corrente
- TV announcers (Fox): Dick Stockton, Daryl Johnston and Tony Siragusa
- Box score

Game information

First quarter

- No scoring plays

Second quarter

- CHI – Devin Hester 45-yard punt return (Robbie Gould kick), 12:20. Bears 7–0.
- MIN – Ryan Longwell 23-yard field goal, 8:54. Bears 7–3. Drive: 6 plays, 57 yards, 3:26.

Third quarter

- MIN – Ryan Longwell 30-yard field goal, 10:07. Bears 7–6. Drive: 11 plays, 45 yards, 4:53.
- CHI – Ricky Manning 54-yard interception return (Robbie Gould kick), 4:33. Bears 14–6.
- CHI – Cedric Benson 24-yard run (Robbie Gould kick), 3:04. Bears 21–6. Drive: 4 plays, 33 yards, 1:16.

Fourth quarter

- CHI – Ciatrick Fason tackled in own end zone, 13:59. Bears 23–6.
- MIN – Ciatrick Fason 4-yard run (Ryan Longwell kick), 5:40. Bears 23–13. Drive: 11 plays, 89 yards, 6:34.

Top passers

- MIN – Brad Johnson – 11/26, 73 yards, 4 INT
- CHI – Rex Grossman – 6/19, 34 yards, 3 INT

Top rushers

- MIN – Chester Taylor – 17 rushes, 99 yards
- CHI – Cedric Benson – 9 rushes, 60 yards, TD

Top receivers

- MIN – Mewelde Moore – 5 receptions, 51 yards
- CHI – Bernard Berrian – 4 receptions, 21 yards

After the loss to New England, the Bears returned to Soldier Field to play the Minnesota Vikings. The weather conditions were harsh throughout the game; the below-freezing temperatures and swirling winds provided a clichéd background for a rivalry game in the "Black and Blue Division". Despite a marginal offensive performance, the Bears managed to defeat the Vikings 23–13.

With their tenth win of the season, the Bears secured their second consecutive NFC North Title. Additionally, the Bears became the first team in the NFL to clinch a playoff berth, and remained tied for the NFL's best record.

=== Week 14: at St. Louis Rams ===
Week Fourteen: Chicago Bears at St. Louis Rams – Game summary

Quarter	1	2	3	4	Total
Bears	0	14	14	14	42
Rams	0	13	0	14	27

at Edward Jones Dome, St. Louis, Missouri

- Date: December 11
- Game time: 7:30 p.m. CST
- Game weather: None (indoor stadium)
- Game attendance: 66,234
- Referee: Jeff Triplette
- TV announcers (ESPN): Mike Tirico, Joe Theismann, and Tony Kornheiser
- Box score

Game information

First quarter

- No scoring plays

Second quarter

- STL – Torry Holt 1-yard pass from Marc Bulger (kick failed), 12:45. Rams 6–0. Drive: 12 plays, 99 yards, 6:22.
- CHI – Devin Hester 94-yard kickoff return (Robbie Gould kick), 12:32. Bears 7–6.
- STL – Steven Jackson 2-yard run (Jeff Wilkins kick), 7:43. Rams 13–7. Drive: 8 plays, 72 yards, 4:49.
- CHI – Bernard Berrian 34-yard pass from Rex Grossman (Robbie Gould kick), 3:30. Bears 14–13. Drive: 9 plays, 74 yards, 4:13.

Third quarter

- CHI – Thomas Jones 30-yard run (Robbie Gould kick), 8:40. Bears 21–13. Drive: 6 plays, 54 yards, 3:16.
- CHI – Muhsin Muhammad 14-yard pass from Rex Grossman (Robbie Gould kick), 3:31. Bears 28–13. Drive: 8 plays, 7 yards, 3:44.

Fourth quarter

- CHI – Adrian N. Peterson 1-yard run (Robbie Gould kick), 13:04. Bears 35–13. Drive: 9 plays, 51 yards, 4:30.
- STL – Torry Holt 6-yard pass from Marc Bulger (Jeff Wilkins kick), 7:35. Bears 35–20. Drive: 15 plays, 98 yards, 5:29.
- CHI – Devin Hester 96-yard kickoff return (Robbie Gould kick), 7:22. Bears 42–20.
- STL – Steven Jackson 6-yard pass from Marc Bulger (Jeff Wilkins kick), 4:41. Bears 42–27. Drive: 10 plays, 51 yards, 2:41.

Top passers

- CHI – Rex Grossman – 13/23, 200 yards, 2 TD
- STL – Marc Bulger – 34/55, 356 yards, 3 TD, INT

Top rushers

- CHI – Thomas Jones – 11 rushes, 76 yards, TD
- STL – Steven Jackson – 18 rushes, 81 yards, TD

Top receivers

- CHI – Bernard Berrian – 3 receptions, 62 yards, TD
- STL – Kevin Curtis – 4 receptions, 77 yards

For week 14, the Bears traveled to St. Louis, Missouri to play the St. Louis Rams. Prior to the game, a quarterback controversy arose between Rex Grossman and Brian Griese regarding the Bears’ starting quarterback position. Grossman, who finished the preceding game with a quarterback rating of 1.3, was eager to make a statement, and rebound against the same team which injured him during the previous year's preseason. Grossman rose to the occasion, and spearheaded the Bears to a 42–27 victory over the Rams, while rookie CB Devin Hester had a record-breaking performance. Also, many spectators of the Monday night game may remember then-Senator Barack Obama's humorous television introduction before kickoff.

During the course of the game, Hester broke the NFL record for combined return touchdowns in a single season with six. He also became the sixth player in NFL history to return two kicks for touchdowns in a single game. For his performance, he earned the NFC Special Teams Player of the Week Award. On a low note, kicker Robbie Gould uncharacteristically missed two field goal attempts, and the Bears announced that defensive tackle Tommie Harris would miss the remainder of the season with a severe hamstring injury.

=== Week 15: vs. Tampa Bay Buccaneers ===
Week Fifteen: Tampa Bay Buccaneers at Chicago Bears – Game summary

Quarter	1	2	3	4	OT	Total
Buccaneers	0	3	7	21	0	31
Bears	7	14	3	7	3	34

at Soldier Field, Chicago, Illinois

- Date: December 17
- Game time: 12:00 p.m. CST
- Game weather: Partly sunny, 49 °F (9 °C)
- Game attendance: 62,260
- Referee: Larry Nemmers
- TV announcers (Fox): Dick Stockton, Daryl Johnston and Tony Siragusa
- Box score

Game information

First quarter

- CHI – Desmond Clark 24-yard pass from Rex Grossman (Robbie Gould kick), 7:42. Bears 7–0. Drive: 7 plays, 62 yards, 3:57.

Second quarter

- TB – Matt Bryant 45-yard field goal, 8:19. Bears 7–3. Drive: 4 plays, -1 yard, 1:34.
- CHI – Thomas Jones 5-yard run (Robbie Gould kick), 3:58. Bears 14–3. Drive: 8 plays, 56 yards, 4:21.
- CHI – Desmond Clark 12-yard pass from Rex Grossman (Robbie Gould kick), 0:23. Bears 21–3. Drive: 6 plays, 53 yards, 1:05.

Third quarter

- CHI – Robbie Gould 38-yard field goal, 5:22. Bears 24–3. Drive: 10 plays, 41 yards, 3:38.
- TB – Mike Alstott 14-yard run (Matt Bryant kick), 0:25. Bears 24–10. Drive: 10 plays, 38 yards, 4:57.

Fourth quarter

- TB – Alex Smith 9-yard pass from Tim Rattay (Matt Bryant kick), 14:13. Bears 24–17. Drive: 3 plays, 16 yards, 1:04.
- CHI – Cedric Benson 4-yard run (Robbie Gould kick), 9:23. Bears 31–17. Drive: 8 plays, 77 yards, 4:50.
- TB – Joey Galloway 64-yard pass from Tim Rattay (Matt Bryant kick), 6:13. Bears 31–24. Drive: 5 plays, 95 yards, 1:12.
- TB – Ike Hilliard 44-yard pass from Tim Rattay (Matt Bryant kick), 3:44. Tied 31–31. Drive: 2 plays, 50 yards, 0:47.

Overtime

- CHI – Robbie Gould 25-yard field goal, 3:37. Bears 34–31. Drive: 6 plays, 43 yards, 2:46.

Top passers

- TB – Tim Rattay – 20/35, 268 yards, 3 TD, INT
- CHI – Rex Grossman – 29/44, 339 yards, 2 TD

Top rushers

- TB – Mike Alstott – 6 rushes, 26 yards, TD
- CHI – Thomas Jones – 17 rushes, 68 yards, TD

Top receivers

- TB – Joey Galloway – 3 receptions, 107 yards, TD
- CHI – Desmond Clark – 7 receptions, 125 yards, 2 TD

The Bears improved to 12–2 and secured home field advantage throughout the NFC playoffs with an overtime victory over their former division rival Tampa Bay Buccaneers. The Bears entered the game without Pro Bowlers Mike Brown, Nathan Vasher and Tommie Harris. Additionally, Lovie Smith deactivated defensive tackle Tank Johnson due to his legal issues.

=== Week 16: at Detroit Lions ===
Week Sixteen: Chicago Bears at Detroit Lions – Game summary

Quarter	1	2	3	4	Total
Bears	3	14	0	9	26
Lions	7	0	14	0	21

at Ford Field, Detroit, Michigan

- Date: December 24
- Game time: 12:00 p.m. CST/1:00 p.m. EST
- Game weather: None (indoor stadium)
- Game attendance: 60,665
- Referee: Terry McAulay
- TV announcers (Fox): Sam Rosen, Tim Ryan and Jay Glazer
- Box score

Game information

First quarter

- CHI – Robbie Gould 36-yard field goal, 8:38. Bears 3–0. Drive: 14 plays, 58 yards, 6:22.
- DET – Dan Campbell 23-yard pass from Jon Kitna (Jason Hanson kick), 2:32. Lions 7–3. Drive: 2 plays, 49 yards, 0:47.

Second quarter

- CHI – Bernard Berrian 13-yard pass from Rex Grossman (Robbie Gould kick), 14:05. Bears 10–7. Drive: 9 plays, 75 yards, 3:27.
- CHI – Adrian N. Peterson 2-yard run (Robbie Gould kick), 0:26. Bears 17–7. Drive: 7 plays, 49 yards, 2:16.

Third quarter

- DET – Mike Furrey 20-yard pass from Jon Kitna (Jason Hanson kick), 10:53. Bears 17–14. Drive: 7 plays, 71 yards, 4:07.
- DET – Roy Williams 2-yard pass from Jon Kitna (Jason Hanson kick), 4:27. Lions 21–17. Drive: 11 plays, 48 yards, 5:06.

Fourth quarter

- CHI – Robbie Gould 36-yard field goal, 12:21. Lions 21–20. Drive: 13 plays, 58 yards, 6:05.
- CHI – Robbie Gould 39-yard field goal, 5:13. Bears 23–21. Drive: 12 plays, 72 yards, 4:54.
- CHI – Robbie Gould 44-yard field goal, 2:50. Bears 26–21. Drive: 4 plays, 6 yards, 0:56.

Top passers

- CHI – Rex Grossman – 20/36, 197 yards, TD
- DET – Jon Kitna – 27/45, 283 yards, 3 TD

Top rushers

- CHI – Thomas Jones – 12 rushes, 62 yards
- DET – Arlen Harris – 10 rushes, 44 yards

Top receivers

- CHI – Muhsin Muhammad – 3 receptions, 64 yards
- DET – Mike Furrey – 10 receptions, 107 yards, TD

The Bears traveled to Detroit, Michigan in hopes of another victory over the Detroit Lions on Christmas Eve. However, the game was essentially meaningless, as the Bears had already clinched the NFC's top playoff seed in the previous week. Therefore, the Bears experimented with different defensive and offensive plans en route to a victory over the Lions.

=== Week 17: vs. Green Bay Packers ===
Week Seventeen: Green Bay Packers at Chicago Bears – Game summary

Quarter	1	2	3	4	Total
Packers	13	10	0	3	26
Bears	0	0	7	0	7

at Soldier Field, Chicago, Illinois

- Date: December 31
- Game time: 7:15 p.m. CST
- Game weather: Cloudy, 50 °F (10 °C)
- Game attendance: 62,287
- Referee: Bill Vinovich
- TV announcers (NBC): Al Michaels, John Madden and Andrea Kremer
- Box score

Game information

First quarter

- GB – Donald Driver 9-yard pass from Brett Favre (Dave Rayner kick), 9:31. Packers 7–0. Drive: 11 plays, 76 yards, 5:29.
- GB – Nick Collins 55-yard interception return (kick failed), 0:50. Packers 13–0.

Second quarter

- GB – Dave Rayner 25-yard field goal, 0:49. Packers 16–0. Drive: 10 plays, 50 yards, 2:54.
- GB – Patrick Dendy 30-yard interception return (Dave Rayner kick), 0:34. Packers 23–0.

Third quarter

- CHI – Mark Bradley 75-yard pass from Brian Griese (Robbie Gould kick), 0:34. Packers 23–7. Drive: 3 plays, 75 yards, 0:54.

Fourth quarter

- GB – Dave Rayner 46-yard field goal, 10:39. Packers 26–7. Drive: 11 plays, 47 yards, 4:55.

Top passers

- GB – Brett Favre – 21/42, 285 yards, TD, INT
- CHI – Brian Griese – 5/15, 124 yards, TD, 2 INT

Top rushers

- GB – Ahman Green – 22 rushes, 71 yards
- CHI – Cedric Benson – 13 rushes, 109 yards

Top receivers

- GB – Ruvell Martin – 7 receptions, 118 yards
- CHI – Mark Bradley – 1 reception, 75 yards, TD

After their road victory against the Detroit Lions, the Bears returned home to finish their season against the archenemy Green Bay Packers. On December 24, the NFL announced that they would move to game to a primetime slot, making it the final game of the 2006 regular season. The loss marked the Bears second consecutive loss in a regular season finale. Brett Favre appeared at the end of the game, and gave a tearful interview with an NBC Sports correspondent, where he admitted his future as a professional was still questionable. Additionally, Grossman's four turnovers (including two interceptions that were returned for a touchdown), zero passer rating, and press conference comments (where he admitted to being underprepared) drew criticism both from fans and the media as the Bears' regular season came to an end.

== Playoffs ==
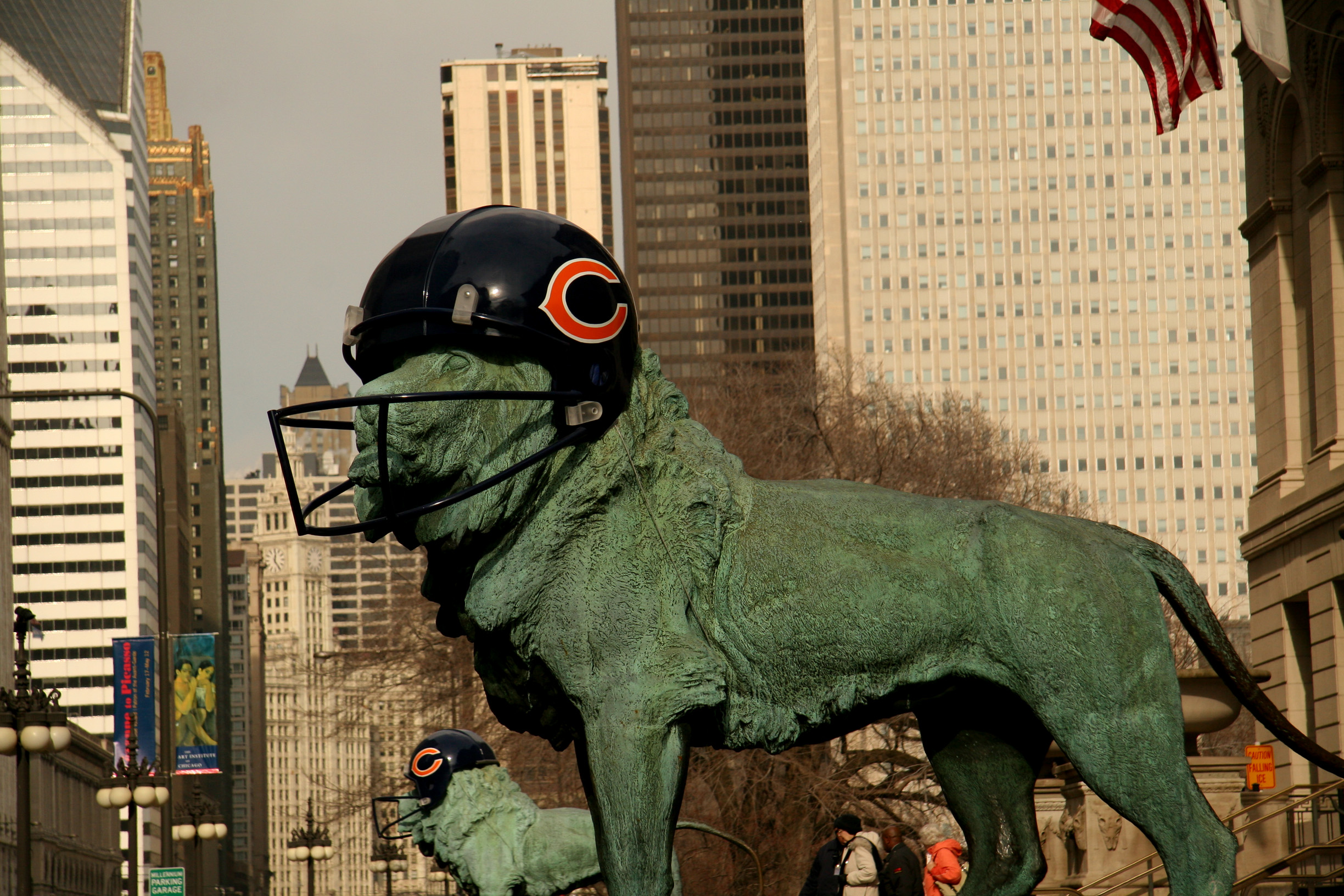
The two lion sculptures outside of the Art Institute of Chicago decorated to show support for the Bears

The Bears clinched a playoff berth after defeating the Minnesota Vikings during week thirteen. They obtained a first round bye the following week, and later secured the NFC's first playoff seed. This ensured the Bears home field advantage for the NFC's Divisional and Conference games.

=== Post season schedule ===
Round	Date	Opponent	Result	Game site
NFC Wild Card	First-round bye			
NFC Divisional	January 14, 2007	Seattle Seahawks (4)	W 27–24 (OT)	Soldier Field
NFC Championship	January 21, 2007	New Orleans Saints (2)	W 39–14	Soldier Field
Super Bowl XLI	February 4, 2007	vs. Indianapolis Colts (A3)	L 17–29	Dolphin Stadium

=== NFC Divisional playoff: vs Seattle Seahawks (4) ===
NFC Divisional Round: Seattle Seahawks (4) at Chicago Bears (1) – Game summary

Quarter	1	2	3	4	OT	Total
Seahawks	0	14	10	0	0	24
Bears	7	14	0	3	3	27

at Soldier Field, Chicago, Illinois

- Date: January 14, 2007
- Game time: 12:00 p.m. CST
- Game weather: Cloudy, 32 °F (0 °C)
- Game attendance: 62,184
- Referee: Gerald Austin
- TV announcers (Fox): Joe Buck, Troy Aikman, Pam Oliver and Chris Myers
- Box score

Game information

First quarter

- CHI – Thomas Jones 9-yard run (Robbie Gould kick), 8:35. Bears 7–0. Drive: 12 plays, 80 yards, 6:25.

Second quarter

- SEA – Nate Burleson 16-yard pass from Matt Hasselbeck (Josh Brown kick), 14:54. Tied 7–7. Drive: 9 plays, 71 yards, 3:54.
- CHI – Bernard Berrian 68-yard pass from Rex Grossman (Robbie Gould kick), 14:36. Bears 14–7. Drive: 1 play, 68 yards, 0:18.
- SEA – Shaun Alexander 4-yard run (Josh Brown kick), 2:29. Tied 14–14. Drive: 5 plays, 26 yards, 1:50.
- CHI – Thomas Jones 7-yard run (Robbie Gould kick), 0:48. Bears 21–14. Drive: 7 plays, 57 yards, 1:41.

Third quarter

- SEA – Josh Brown 40-yard field goal, 9:56. Bears 21–17. Drive: 9 plays, 49 yards, 5:04.
- SEA – Shaun Alexander 13-yard run (Josh Brown kick), 4:57. Seahawks 24–21. Drive: 7 plays, 51 yards, 2:25.

Fourth quarter

- CHI – Robbie Gould 41-yard field goal, 4:24. Tied 24–24. Drive: 12 plays, 48 yards, 5:51.

Overtime

- CHI – Robbie Gould 49-yard field goal, 10:02. Bears 27–24. Drive: 7 plays, 34 yards, 2:49.

Top passers

- SEA – Matt Hasselbeck – 18/33, 195 yards, TD, INT
- CHI – Rex Grossman – 21/38, 282 yards, TD, INT

Top rushers

- SEA – Shaun Alexander – 26 rushes, 108 yards, 2 TD
- CHI – Thomas Jones – 21 rushes, 66 yards, 2 TD

Top receivers

- SEA – Darrell Jackson – 4 receptions, 49 yards
- CHI – Bernard Berrian – 5 receptions, 105 yards, TD

The Bears advanced to the NFC Championship game by defeating the Seattle Seahawks on January 14, 2007. In a hard-fought battle, the Bears had to rely on all “four phases” of the game (offense, defense, special teams, and crowd noise) to win 27–24 in overtime.

=== NFC Championship: vs New Orleans Saints (2) ===
NFC Championship Game: New Orleans Saints (2) at Chicago Bears (1) – Game summary

Quarter	1	2	3	4	Total
Saints	0	7	7	0	14
Bears	3	13	2	21	39

at Soldier Field, Chicago, Illinois

- Date: January 21, 2007
- Game time: 2:00 p.m. CST
- Game weather: Snow, 28 °F (−2 °C)
- Game attendance: 61,047
- Referee: Terry McAulay
- TV announcers (Fox): Joe Buck, Troy Aikman, Pam Oliver and Chris Myers
- Box score

Game information

First quarter

- CHI – Robbie Gould 19-yard field goal, 0:41. Bears 3–0. Drive: 11 plays, 35 yards, 4:44.

Second quarter

- CHI – Robbie Gould 43-yard field goal, 13:40. Bears 6–0. Drive: 4 plays, 5 yards, 1:53.
- CHI – Robbie Gould 24-yard field goal, 8:52. Bears 9–0. Drive: 8 plays, 43 yards, 3:25.
- CHI – Thomas Jones 2-yard run (Robbie Gould kick), 1:56. Bears 16–0. Drive: 8 plays, 69 yards, 3:55.
- NO – Marques Colston 13-yard pass from Drew Brees (John Carney kick), 0:46. Bears 16–7. Drive: 8 plays, 73 yards, 1:10.

Third quarter

- NO – Reggie Bush 88-yard pass from Drew Brees (John Carney kick), 12:20. Bears 16–14. Drive: 2 plays, 93 yards, 0:53.
- CHI – Drew Brees intentional grounding in end zone, 5:27. Bears 18–14.

Fourth quarter

- CHI – Bernard Berrian 33-yard pass from Rex Grossman (Robbie Gould kick), 14:23. Bears 25–14. Drive: 5 plays, 85 yards, 2:24.
- CHI – Cedric Benson 12-yard run (Robbie Gould kick), 11:37. Bears 32–14. Drive: 4 plays, 26 yards, 2:04.
- CHI – Thomas Jones 15-yard run (Robbie Gould kick), 4:19. Bears 39–14. Drive: 5 plays, 30 yards, 3:02.

Top passers

- NO – Drew Brees – 27/49, 354 yards, 2 TD, INT
- CHI – Rex Grossman – 11/26, 144 yards, TD

Top rushers

- NO – Reggie Bush – 4 rushes, 19 yards
- CHI – Thomas Jones – 19 rushes, 123 yards, 2 TD

Top receivers

- NO – Reggie Bush – 7 receptions, 132 yards, TD
- CHI – Bernard Berrian – 5 receptions, 85 yards, TD

The Chicago Bears returned to Soldier Field to play the second-seeded New Orleans Saints for the right to represent the NFC in Super Bowl XLI. On a cold field with unsure footing, and eventually falling snow, the Bears defeated the Saints 39–14 to claim their first NFC Championship since the 1985 Season. After the game, Bears owner Virginia McCaskey was presented the George Halas Trophy, named after her late father, "Papa Bear" George Halas. With the win, Lovie Smith became the first African American coach to achieve a Super Bowl berth. In Super Bowl XLI, The Bears would match up against the Indianapolis Colts, and Smith would face his mentor, Tony Dungy.

=== Super Bowl XLI: vs Indianapolis Colts (A3) ===
Super Bowl XLI: Indianapolis Colts (A3) vs. Chicago Bears (N1) – Game summary

Quarter	1	2	3	4	Total
Colts	6	10	6	7	29
Bears	14	0	3	0	17

at Dolphin Stadium, Miami Gardens, Florida

- Date: February 4, 2007
- Game time: 5:25 p.m. CST/6:25 p.m. EST
- Game weather: Rain, 67 °F (19 °C)
- Game attendance: 74,512
- Referee: Tony Corrente
- TV announcers (CBS): Jim Nantz, Phil Simms, Solomon Wilcots, Steve Tasker, Lesley Visser and Sam Ryan
- Box score

Game information

First quarter

- CHI – Devin Hester 92-yard kickoff return (Robbie Gould kick), 14:46. Bears 7–0.
- IND – Reggie Wayne 53-yard pass from Peyton Manning (kick failed), 6:50. Bears 7–6. Drive: 9 plays, 80 yards, 4:30.
- CHI – Muhsin Muhammad 4-yard pass from Rex Grossman (Robbie Gould kick), 4:34. Bears 14–6. Drive: 4 plays, 57 yards, 2:00.

Second quarter

- IND – Adam Vinatieri 29-yard field goal, 11:17. Bears 14–9. Drive: 8 plays, 47 yards, 3:52.
- IND – Dominic Rhodes 1-yard run (Adam Vinatieri kick), 6:09. Colts 16–14. Drive: 7 plays, 58 yards, 3:08.

Third quarter

- IND – Adam Vinatieri 24-yard field goal, 7:26. Colts 19–14. Drive: 13 plays, 56 yards, 7:34.
- IND – Adam Vinatieri 20-yard field goal, 3:16. Colts 22–14. Drive: 6 plays, 62 yards, 2:07.
- CHI – Robbie Gould 44-yard field goal, 1:14. Colts 22–17. Drive: 6 plays, 14 yards, 2:02.

Fourth quarter

- IND – Kelvin Hayden 56-yard interception return (Adam Vinatieri kick), 11:44. Colts 29–17.

Top passers

- IND – Peyton Manning – 25/38, 247 yards, TD, INT
- CHI – Rex Grossman – 20/28, 165 yards, TD, 2 INT

Top rushers

- IND – Dominic Rhodes – 21 rushes, 113 yards, TD
- CHI – Thomas Jones – 15 rushes, 112 yards

Top receivers

- IND – Joseph Addai – 10 receptions, 66 yards
- CHI – Desmond Clark – 6 receptions, 64 yards

Super Bowl XLI, the first Super Bowl to be played entirely in intemperate weather, saw the Bears lose to the Indianapolis Colts at Dolphin Stadium in Miami.

== 2007 Pro Bowl ==
Eight members of the Chicago Bears were selected to play in the 2007 Pro Bowl. Olin Kreutz, Tommie Harris, Lance Briggs, Brian Urlacher, Robbie Gould, Devin Hester, and Brendon Ayanbadejo were selected by NFL fans throughout the nation to represent the Bears. The eight selections were the most from any team in the NFC. The Bears had not sent that many players to Honolulu since the 1986 Pro Bowl, which succeeded the 1985 NFL season, when they sent nine. On January 25, Bears' left guard Ruben Brown was named to his ninth Pro Bowl, taking the spot of injured Shawn Andrews of the Philadelphia Eagles. However, Harris, Urlacher, Kreutz, and Briggs missed the Pro Bowl on the account of injuries.

== Off the field incidents ==
Perhaps the most prevalent off-field occurrences were the actions taken by and against Tank Johnson and Ricky Manning, Jr. On December 14, 2006, Lake County police officers searched Johnson's home in Gurnee, Illinois, and discovered that he possessed six firearms, including two assault rifles. Johnson was charged with violation of probation and possessing unlicensed weapons. A Chicago media storm erupted shortly after when Johnson's bodyguard was shot and killed December 16, after attending a club with him. Bears coach Lovie Smith deactivated Johnson for the following game against the Tampa Bay Buccaneers based on the incidents. Speculation arose in Chicago that the Bears' defensive tackle would not be allowed either legally or by the team to travel to Miami to play in the Super Bowl, but he was ultimately allowed to play. Johnson eventually served 60 days in a Cook County jail because of the charges. Manning Jr. faced a similar situation that cost him a one-game suspension. On April 23, 2006, two days after receiving an offer sheet from the Bears, Manning Jr. attacked a man in a Denny's restaurant after teasing him for working on a laptop computer. In September 2006, Manning pleaded no contest to felony assault in exchange for another probation deal, though later he proclaimed his innocence.

== Staff ==
2006 Chicago Bears staff
Front office: Owner – Virginia Halas McCaskey; Chairman – Michael McCaskey; President/CEO – Ted Phillips; General manager – Jerry Angelo; Director of pro personnel – Bobby DePaul; Director of college scouting – Greg Gabriel; Head coaches: Head coach – Lovie Smith; Football operations assistant – Andrew Hayes-Stoker; Offensive coaches: Offensive coordinator – Ron Turner; Quarterbacks – Wade Wilson; Running backs – Tim Spencer; Wide receivers – Darryl Drake; Tight ends – Rob Boras; Offensive line – Harry Hiestand; Assistant offensive line – Harold Goodwin; Offensive quality control – Mike Bajakian	Defensive coaches: Defensive coordinator – Ron Rivera; Defensive line – Don Johnson; Linebackers – Bob Babich; Secondary – Steve Wilks; Defensive assistant – Lloyd Lee; Defensive quality control – Gill Byrd; Special teams coaches: Special teams – Dave Toub; Assistant special teams – Kevin O'Dea; Strength and conditioning: Director of physical development – Rusty Jones; Assistant strength and conditioning – Jim Arthur

== Final roster ==
2006 Chicago Bears roster
Quarterbacks (QB): 14 Brian Griese; 8 Rex Grossman; 18 Kyle Orton; Running backs (RB): 32 Cedric Benson; 20 Thomas Jones; 37 Jason McKie FB; 29 Adrian Peterson; 48 J. D. Runnels FB; Wide receivers (WR): 80 Bernard Berrian; 16 Mark Bradley; 81 Rashied Davis KR; 12 Justin Gage; 87 Muhsin Muhammad; Tight ends (TE): 88 Desmond Clark; 85 John Gilmore; 82 Gabe Reid	Offensive linemen (OL): 74 Ruben Brown G; 63 Roberto Garza G; 57 Olin Kreutz C; 60 Terrence Metcalf G; 69 Fred Miller T; 68 Anthony Oakley G/T; 78 John St. Clair T; 76 John Tait T; Defensive linemen (DL): 97 Mark Anderson DE; 70 Alfonso Boone DT; 96 Alex Brown DE; 90 Antonio Garay DT; 71 Israel Idonije DE; 99 Tank Johnson DT; 93 Adewale Ogunleye DE; 95 Ian Scott DT	Linebackers (LB): 94 Brendon Ayanbadejo OLB; 55 Lance Briggs OLB; 92 Hunter Hillenmeyer OLB; 53 Leon Joe OLB; 58 Darrell McClover OLB; 54 Brian Urlacher MLB; 59 Rod Wilson MLB; Defensive backs (DB): 22 Tyler Everett SS; 46 Chris Harris S; 23 Devin Hester; 35 Todd Johnson SS; 38 Danieal Manning FS; 24 Ricky Manning CB; 33 Charles Tillman CB; 27 Nick Turnbull FS; 31 Nathan Vasher CB; 21 Dante Wesley CB; 44 Cameron Worrell FS; Special teams (ST): 9 Robbie Gould K; 65 Patrick Mannelly LS; 4 Brad Maynard P	Practice squad: 86 Richard Angulo TE; 72 Copeland Bryan DE; 83 Mike Hass WR; 75 Mark LeVoir T; 64 Tyler Reed G; 84 Brandon Rideau WR; 45 Dwayne Slay S; Reserve: 30 Mike Brown S (IR); 17 Airese Currie WR (IR); 98 Dusty Dvoracek DT (IR); 91 Tommie Harris DT (IR); 47 Bryan Johnson FB (IR); 73 Khari Long DE (IR); 36 Brandon McGowan S (IR); 52 Jamar Williams LB (IR); Rookies in italics 53 active, 8 reserve, 7 practice squad
