= Alex Brown (defensive end) =

American football player (born 1979)

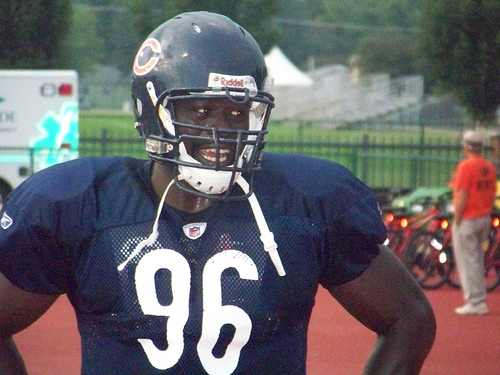
- Brown with the Chicago Bears in 2008

No. 96
- Position: Defensive end

Personal information
- Born: June 4, 1979 (age 47); Jasper, Florida, U.S.
- Listed height: 6 ft 3 in (1.91 m)
- Listed weight: 260 lb (118 kg)

Career information
- High school: Hamilton County (Jasper)
- College: Florida
- NFL draft: 2002: 4th round, 104th overall pick

Career history
- Chicago Bears (2002–2009); New Orleans Saints (2010)

Awards and highlights
- Consensus All-American (2001); First-team All-American (1999); Third-team All-American (2000); 3× First-team All-SEC (1999, 2000, 2001); SEC Defensive Player of the Year (2001); University of Florida Athletic Hall of Fame

Career NFL statistics
- Total tackles: 421
- Sacks: 45.5
- Forced fumbles: 17
- Fumble recoveries: 12
- Interceptions: 5
- Stats at Pro Football Reference

Alex James Brown (born June 4, 1979) is an American former professional football player who was a defensive end in the National Football League (NFL) for nine seasons. He played college football for the Florida Gators, and was a two-time All-American. The Chicago Bears picked Brown in the fourth round of the 2002 NFL draft, and he also played for the New Orleans Saints.

== Early life ==
Brown was born in Jasper, Florida in 1979. He attended Hamilton County High School in Jasper, and played high school football for the Hamilton County Trojans. As the Trojans' senior quarterback in 1996, Brown threw for 863 yards and four touchdowns, and rushed for 767 yards and eighteen touchdowns; as a starting linebacker, he also compiled 117 total tackles (with seven tackles for loss), five blocked passes, four fumble recoveries, two forced fumbles and two blocked field goals. He was honored as a Florida Class 3A all-state selection and a National Recruiting Adviser and SuperPrep high school All-American. Brown was also a standout basketball player and track and field athlete, and was the state champion discus thrower in 1996.

== College career ==
Brown accepted an athletic scholarship to attend the University of Florida in Gainesville, Florida, where he played for coach Steve Spurrier's Florida Gators football team from 1998 to 2001. The Gators coaching staff decided to red-shirt him as a true freshman in 1997. He saw action at outside linebacker in 1998, recording ten tackles with two sacks and three tackles for a loss as the backup to All-American starter Jevon Kearse.

As a sophomore starter in 1999, Brown recorded fifty-six tackles with 7.5 sacks and twelve tackles for a loss. Arguably, he played his best college game on September 18, 1999, when he sacked quarterback Tee Martin five times in the Gators' 23–21 upset of the second-ranked Tennessee Volunteers. He was honored as first-team All-Southeastern Conference (SEC) selection and first-team All-American by the Walter Camp Foundation and Football News, and was one of the twelve semi-finalists for the Lombardi Award.

During the Gators' 2000 SEC championship season, Brown was a team captain and started every game at right defensive end, recording fifty tackles with 10.5 sacks, fourteen tackles for a loss and four blocked passes, while forcing a fumble and blocking three kicks. Brown was a first-team All-SEC selection, a second-team All-American, and was once again one of the twelve semi-finalists for the Lombardi Award.

As a senior in 2001, Brown recorded forty-five tackles and a career-best thirteen sacks. He was a first-team All-SEC selection, and was recognized as a consensus first-team All-American, after receiving first-team honors from a majority of All-American selector organizations. He was also the 2001 SEC Defensive Player of the Year, one of the four finalists for the Lombardi Award, and one of five finalists of the Bronko Nagurski Trophy.

During his four-year college career, Brown totaled 161 tackles with forty-seven tackles for a loss (sixth-best career total in Gators history), and set the Gators' current career record of thirty-three quarterback sacks. He was inducted into the University of Florida Athletic Hall of Fame as a "Gator Great" in 2012.

== Professional career ==
Pre-draft measurables
Height	Weight
6 ft 3 1/2 in (1.92 m)	260 lb (118 kg)
Values from NFL Combine

=== Chicago Bears ===
The Chicago Bears selected Brown in the fourth round (104th pick overall) of the 2002 NFL draft, and he played for the Bears from 2002 to 2009. As a rookie, he started nine of the fifteen games in which he played at right defensive end and logged 2.5 quarterback sacks. He also totaled 40 tackles (31 unassisted) and three passes broken up, while also contributing on special teams coverage. During the 2003 season, his first as a full-time starter, he led the Bears with 5.5 sacks, with a career-high fifty-eight tackles (forty-nine solos), and six tackles for losses while forcing two fumbles and recovering a fumble.

He started at right defensive end for all sixteen regular season games in 2004, and compiling six sacks and fifty tackles, with eleven tackles for a loss and nine passes defensed. In a game against the New York Giants on November 7, 2004, Brown recorded a career-high four sacks to go along with eight tackles, including six solos stops. He also forced a fumble and batted down a pass at the line of scrimmage. For his efforts, Brown was named the NFL Defensive Player of the Week by Pro Football Weekly.

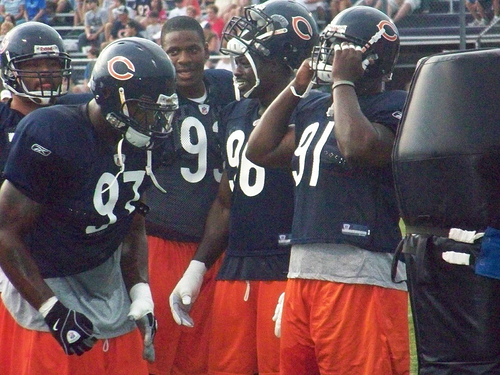
Brown, along with Adewale Ogunleye, Tommie Harris and Mark Anderson during training camp in 2008.

Brown was a first-alternate for the Pro Bowl after recording 75 tackles (nine for a loss) and six sacks, eight broken up passes and three forced fumbles during the 2005 season. Sports Illustrated selected him for its All-Pro Team. He was named NFC Defensive Player of the Week following the game against the Tampa Bay Buccaneers on November 27, 2005. In 2006, he was selected as a second-alternate for the Pro Bowl after recording a career-high seven sacks and two interceptions while making forty-six tackles, three forced fumbles, two fumble recoveries and two passes broken up while starting all sixteen games at right defensive end.

In 2007 Brown tied for the team lead with five passes broken up, tied for second with five tackles for a loss and two fumble recoveries and tied for third with two forced fumbles, after playing in all sixteen games (two starts) for the fifth straight year, extending his consecutive games played streak to a team-high ninety-five contests. He ranked second on the defensive line with fifty-eight tackles and added five quarterback hits, 4.5 sacks, one interception, two forced fumbles and a blocked kick.

On December 22, 2008, Brown deflected a field goal attempt by Packers kicker Mason Crosby in the final twenty-five seconds of the fourth quarter to set up the game-winning field goal for the Bears in a 20–17 overtime victory over the Green Bay Packers. In the second game of the 2009 season, the Bears upset the defending Super Bowl champion Pittsburgh Steelers 17–14, and Brown recorded two key sacks of Steelers quarterback Ben Roethlisberger. Brown was later carted off the field with four minutes left in the game with a sprained ankle.

After the 2009 season, the Bears released Brown on April 1, 2010, after failing to trade him to another team.

=== New Orleans Saints ===
On April 7, 2010, the New Orleans Saints signed Brown to a two-year contract. He played his final NFL season for the Saints, starting in all sixteen games at left defensive end. The Saints released Brown on August 30, 2011.

=== Retirement ===
On August 9, 2012, Alex Brown signed a one-day contract with the Bears to officially retire with the team. With the Bears, his 43.5 sacks rank fourth in team history, and his five interceptions rank second behind Richard Dent among Bears defensive ends.

In his nine-season NFL career, Brown played in 143 regular season games, started 123 of them, and compiled 421 tackles, 43.5 quarterback sacks, forty-two deflected passes, seventeen forced fumbles with twelve recovered, and five interceptions.

== NFL career statistics ==
Legend
**Bold**	Career high

=== Regular season ===
Year	Team	Games		Tackles					Interceptions					Fumbles			
Year	Team	GP	GS	Cmb	Solo	Ast	Sck	TFL	Int	Yds	TD	Lng	PD	FF	FR	Yds	TD
2002	CHI	15	9	42	33	9	2.5	3	0	0	0	0	3	1	**3**	0	0
2003	CHI	**16**	**16**	**58**	**48**	10	5.5	10	1	0	0	0	6	2	1	0	0
2004	CHI	**16**	**16**	56	44	**12**	6.0	10	0	0	0	0	**9**	**3**	1	0	0
2005	CHI	**16**	**16**	46	39	7	6.0	12	0	0	0	0	6	**3**	0	0	0
2006	CHI	**16**	**16**	47	41	6	**7.0**	9	**2**	**22**	0	**18**	4	**3**	2	0	0
2007	CHI	**16**	2	41	31	10	4.5	6	1	7	0	7	5	2	2	0	0
2008	CHI	**16**	**16**	44	42	2	6.0	**19**	1	-2	0	-2	5	1	1	**18**	0
2009	CHI	**16**	**16**	48	36	**12**	6.0	10	0	0	0	0	1	1	1	0	0
2010	NOR	**16**	**16**	39	32	7	2.0	6	0	0	0	0	3	1	1	0	0
		143	123	421	346	75	45.5	85	5	27	0	18	42	17	12	18	0

=== Playoffs ===
Year	Team	Games		Tackles					Interceptions					Fumbles			
Year	Team	GP	GS	Cmb	Solo	Ast	Sck	TFL	Int	Yds	TD	Lng	PD	FF	FR	Yds	TD
2005	CHI	1	1	1	1	0	0.0	1	0	0	0	0	**1**	0	0	0	0
2006	CHI	**3**	**3**	**8**	**7**	**1**	**1.0**	**2**	0	0	0	0	0	0	0	0	0
2010	NOR	1	1	6	5	**1**	**1.0**	**2**	0	0	0	0	**1**	0	0	0	0
		5	5	15	13	2	2.0	5	0	0	0	0	2	0	0	0	0

== Life after football ==
Brown works for Coyote Logistics.

Brown is an analyst for the 120 Sports "Football Fix" in Chicago. He, former Bears teammate Desmond Clark, and "non-descript white guy" Ryan Steele also host the Dez Clark & Alex Brown Show sports radio talk show in Chicago. Following Bears games, Brown, David Kaplan, former teammate Lance Briggs, and former Bears head coach Dave Wannstedt serve as analysts for NBC Sports Chicago's Football Aftershow.

He is a Republican precinct committeeman in Vernon Hills, Illinois where he resides with his wife, Kari, who serves as a village trustee.

== See also ==
- 1999 College Football All-America Team
- 2001 College Football All-America Team
- Florida Gators football, 1990–99
- List of Chicago Bears players
- List of Florida Gators football All-Americans
- List of Florida Gators in the NFL draft
- List of New Orleans Saints players
- List of University of Florida Athletic Hall of Fame members
