= Adewale Ogunleye =

American football player (born 1977)

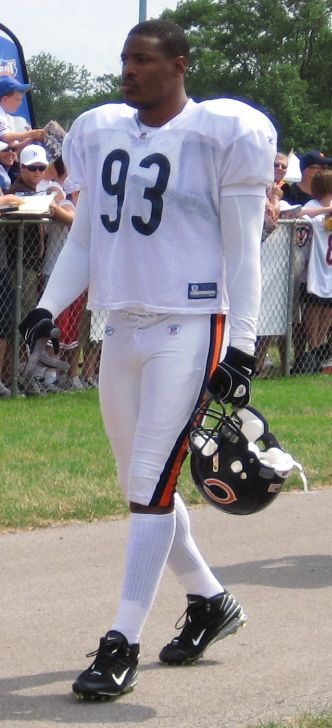
- Ogunleye with the Chicago Bears in 2007

No. 90, 93, 99
- Position: Defensive end

Personal information
- Born: August 9, 1977 (age 49); Brooklyn, New York, U.S.
- Listed height: 6 ft 4 in (1.93 m)
- Listed weight: 260 lb (118 kg)

Career information
- High school: Tottenville (Staten Island, New York)
- College: Indiana
- NFL draft: 2000: undrafted

Career history
- Miami Dolphins (2000–2003); Chicago Bears (2004–2009); Houston Texans (2010)

Awards and highlights
- First-team All-Pro (2003); Pro Bowl (2003); First-team All-Big Ten (1997); 2× Second-team All-Big Ten (1998, 1999); Indiana University Athletics Hall Of Fame (2014)

Career NFL statistics
- Total tackles: 389
- Sacks: 67
- Forced fumbles: 17
- Fumble recoveries: 14
- Interceptions: 1
- Stats at Pro Football Reference

Adewale Ogunleye (/ˌɑːdeɪˈwɑːleɪ oʊɡuːnˈleɪjeɪ/; born August 9, 1977) is an American former professional football player who was a defensive end for 11 seasons in the National Football League (NFL). He played college football for the Indiana Hoosiers. He was signed by the Miami Dolphins as an undrafted free agent in 2000 and also played for the Chicago Bears and Houston Texans.

== Early life and education ==
Ogunleye was born in Brooklyn, New York and grew up in Tompkinsville, Staten Island. He is of a Nigerian and Yoruba background. His paternal grandfather, Emmanuel Taiwo Ogunleye, later Oba Ogunleye II Amugbayanwo (1922–1974) was the Oba (Elemure) of the city-state of Emure in Ekiti State, thus making him an Omoba of the Yoruba people. His last name means "Ogun (the god of Iron) has honor." His father is a social worker employed by the City of New York.

Ogunleye played high school football at Tottenville High School in his hometown of Staten Island in New York City, He was a classmate of Major League Baseball All-Star starting pitcher Jason Marquis and a teammate of three-time Super Bowl-winning offensive guard Joe Andruzzi.

== College career ==
Ogunleye played college football at Indiana from 1996 to 1999. During his college career, Ogunleye set school records for sacks (34.5) and tackles for loss (64). Additionally, he accumulated 167 tackles, eight forced fumbles and three fumble recoveries. Ogunleye earned All-Big Ten honors in each of his final three seasons. He graduated with a degree in English.

In November 2014, Ogunleye was inducted into the Indiana Athletic Hall of Fame.

In May 2014 after finishing his National Football League career, Ogunleye obtained a Master of Business Administration (MBA) from George Washington University in Washington, D.C.

== Professional career ==
Pre-draft measurables
Height	Weight
6 ft 4 in (1.93 m)	253 lb (115 kg)
All values from NFL Combine

Despite being projected as a first- or second-round NFL draft pick following his junior season in 1998, Ogunleye chose to return to Indiana for his senior season. During the 1999 season, he suffered a major knee injury, which ended his college career, and a staph infection, which caused him to lose 50 pounds. He was not selected in the 2000 NFL draft.

=== Miami Dolphins ===
Following the 2000 Draft, Ogunleye signed with the Miami Dolphins as an undrafted free agent. He spent the first year of his NFL career on injured reserve. In 2001, Ogunleye had recovered well enough to lead the team during the preseason in sacks and that earned him a spot on the Dolphins’ 53-man roster. By the end of his fourth season with the Miami Dolphins, Ogunleye had been voted starter in the 2004 NFL Pro Bowl. He led the AFC with 15 sacks in the 2003-2004 NFL season. He was given the Dan Marino Most Valuable Player of the year award, by the Miami Dolphins, that same season.

=== Chicago Bears ===
He was traded by the Dolphins to the Bears for wide receiver Marty Booker and a 3rd-round pick in the 2005 NFL draft after holding out during the month of August before the 2004 NFL season. Ogunleye quickly signed a record-breaking 6-year contract with the Bears. During the next six seasons Ogunleye became a mainstay on the Bears top-ranked defense. During the 2005 NFL season, Ogunleye spearheaded the Bear's defensive line by recording ten sacks. Ogunleye was named team captain and helped the Bears reach Super Bowl XLI in Miami during the 2006 season.

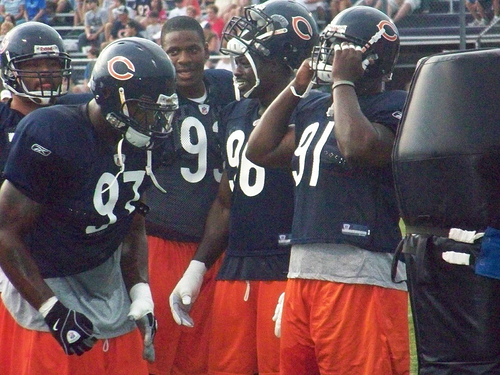
Ogunleye, along with Tommie Harris, Alex Brown and Mark Anderson during training camp in 2008

In 2008, Ogunleye was named the NFL Defensive Player of the Week for the week one after recording a safety and making a key fourth down stop against the Indianapolis Colts.

On December 20, 2009, in a game against the Baltimore Ravens, Ogunleye fractured his left fibula. He was placed on season-ending injured reserve on December 26.

=== Houston Texans ===
On September 14, 2010, Ogunleye signed a one-year tender with the Houston Texans after his contract with the Chicago Bears had expired. At the end of the 2011 season, Ogunleye would end his professional playing career. He finished with 11 NFL seasons under his belt. He finished with career totals of 389 tackles, 67.5 sacks, 17 forced fumbles, and 14 fumble recoveries, 2 safeties and 1 interception.

=== NFL statistics ===
Year	Team	GP	COMB	TOTAL	AST	SACK	FF	FR	FR YDS	INT	IR YDS	AVG IR	LNG	TD	PD
2001	MIA	7	3	1	2	0.5	0	0	0	0	0	0	0	0	0
2002	MIA	16	44	32	12	9.5	3	2	0	0	0	0	0	0	3
2003	MIA	16	62	43	19	15.0	2	1	0	0	0	0	0	0	5
2004	CHI	12	37	28	9	5.0	3	1	0	0	0	0	0	0	2
2005	CHI	15	40	36	4	10.0	1	1	0	0	0	0	0	0	5
2006	CHI	14	43	28	15	6.5	1	3	0	0	0	0	0	0	4
2007	CHI	16	58	53	5	9.0	6	3	0	0	0	0	0	0	3
2008	CHI	16	62	48	14	5.0	0	0	0	1	0	0	0	0	4
2009	CHI	14	38	25	13	6.5	1	3	-2	0	0	0	0	0	0
2010	HOU	4	2	1	1	0.0	0	0	0	0	0	0	0	0	0
Career		130	389	295	94	67.0	17	14	0	1	0	0	0	0	26
