= Tommie Harris =

American football player (born 1983)

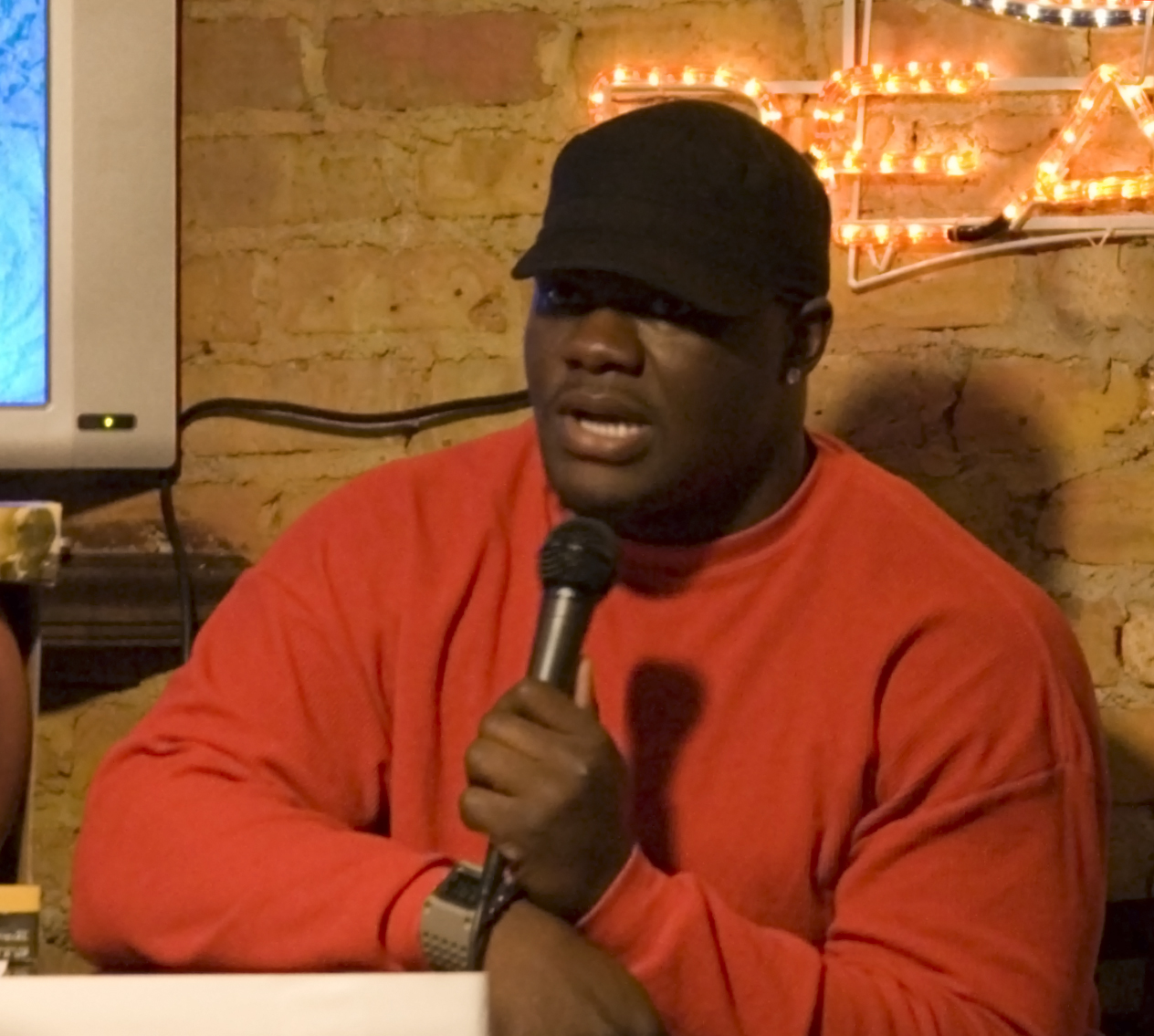
- Harris in 2007

No. 91, 96, 90
- Position: Defensive tackle

Personal information
- Born: April 29, 1983 (age 43); Nuremberg, Germany
- Listed height: 6 ft 3 in (1.91 m)
- Listed weight: 295 lb (134 kg)

Career information
- High school: Ellison (Killeen, Texas, U.S.)
- College: Oklahoma
- NFL draft: 2004: 1st round, 14th overall pick

Career history
- Chicago Bears (2004–2010); Indianapolis Colts (2011)*; San Diego Chargers (2011)
- * Offseason or practice squad member only

Awards and highlights
- Second-team All-Pro (2005); 3× Pro Bowl (2005–2007); PFWA All-Rookie Team (2004); 100 greatest Bears of All-Time; Unanimous All-American (2003); Consensus All-American (2002); 3× First-team All-Big 12 (2001–2003); Lombardi Award (2003); Bill Willis Trophy (2003); Big 12 Defensive Freshman of the Year (2001)

Career NFL statistics
- Total tackles: 231
- Sacks: 31.5
- Forced fumbles: 6
- Fumble recoveries: 7
- Interceptions: 1
- Stats at Pro Football Reference

Tommie Harris Jr. (born April 29, 1983) is an American former professional football player who was a defensive tackle for eight seasons in the National Football League (NFL). He played college football for the University of Oklahoma, and was recognized as a consensus All-American twice. The Chicago Bears chose him in the first round of the 2004 NFL draft, and he also played a season for the San Diego Chargers. He was a three-time Pro Bowl selection.

== Early life ==
Harris was born in Nuremberg, Germany, where his father, Tommie Sr, was stationed as a United States Army drill sergeant. Harris and his family relocated often due to Tommie Sr's role in the Army before finally settling in Killeen, Texas. Harris' father became a Pentecostal minister, while his mother, Janine, worked as a special education teacher. Harris was raised in a devout Christian household alongside his four sisters.

He attended Ellison High School in Killeen. As a member of the Ellison Eagles, Harris became one of the nation's top defensive high school prospects, including being ranked as the No. 35 high school prospect in the nation by recruiting analyst Tom Lemming. During the 1998 football season, he was a back-up defensive tackle in his sophomore year for the Eagles who were ranked No. 1 in the state of Texas and No. 13 in the nation. He was also a member of Ellison's track and field team, where he participated in the shot put.

== College career ==
While attending the University of Oklahoma, Harris played for coach Bob Stoops's Oklahoma Sooners football team from 2001 to 2003. He is one of the very few players in OU history to start every game of his true freshman season. He was a two-time All-Big 12 selection, and was recognized as a consensus first-team All-American in 2002 and a unanimous first-team All-American in 2003. In his junior and final season as a Sooner, Harris won the Lombardi Award as the nation's best lineman in 2003. He was named to the Sports Illustrated All-Decade Team in 2009.

== Professional career ==
Pre-draft measurables
Height	Weight	Arm length	Hand span	40-yard dash	20-yard shuttle	Vertical jump	Broad jump	Bench press
6 ft 2 1/2 in (1.89 m)	295 lb (134 kg)	32 in (0.81 m)	9 1/8 in (0.23 m)	4.78 s	4.31 s	31 in (0.79 m)	9 ft 1 in (2.77 m)	29 reps
All values from NFL Combine/Pro Day

=== Chicago Bears ===
The Chicago Bears selected Harris in the first round, 14th overall, in the 2004 NFL draft. Harris, a 3-technique defensive tackle, complimented Lovie Smith's Cover 2 defense, which relied on mobile lineman to penetrate the line of scrimmage. Smith compared Harris to Warren Sapp, whom he coached during his tenure with the Tampa Bay Buccaneers. Harris appeared in all 16 games for the Bears during the 2004 NFL season, where he recorded 44 combined tackles, 7 tackles for loss, and 3.5 sacks. He finished second in balloting for the Defensive Rookie of the Year award.

In 2005, Harris was selected for the 2006 Pro Bowl.

Harris enjoyed an excellent start to the 2006 season, leading the league with five sacks after four games. He was instrumental in a week 3 victory over the Vikings, disrupting a handoff in the Vikings backfield and forcing a fumble, which allowed the Bears to score the game-winning touchdown. Harris was awarded the NFC's "Defensive Player of the Week" award twice in three weeks. Harris suffered a season-ending hamstring injury in the Bears' Week 13 victory against the Vikings. Harris was selected to play in the 2007 Pro Bowl.

Harris missed the first three games of the 2007 preseason while recovering from his hamstring injury. He played in the Bears' season opener against the San Diego Chargers and forced a fumble. He appeared in all 16 games for the Bears, finishing the 2007 campaign with two forced fumbles and a career high eight sacks. Harris was selected to his third consecutive Pro Bowl, but did not attend due a knee injury.

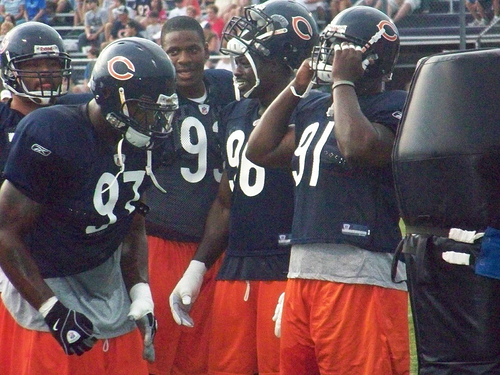
Harris, along with Adewale Ogunleye, Alex Brown and Mark Anderson during training camp in 2008

One June 19, 2008, Harris signed a four-year contract extension with the Bears worth $40 million, which made him the highest paid defensive tackle in the NFL. The incentive-laden contract would award Harris $8.5 million if he was selected to the Pro Bowls in 2008, 2009, and 2010, while also including an additional $2 million bonus based on performance. $17 million of the contract was guaranteed. Harris missed the Bears week four game against the Philadelphia Eagles due to a knee injury. The Bears suspended Harris for their following game against the Detroit Lions for missing scheduled treatments to rehabilitate his knee without a proper excuse. Harris appeared in 14 games for the Bears, tallying 37 tackles and 4 sacks.

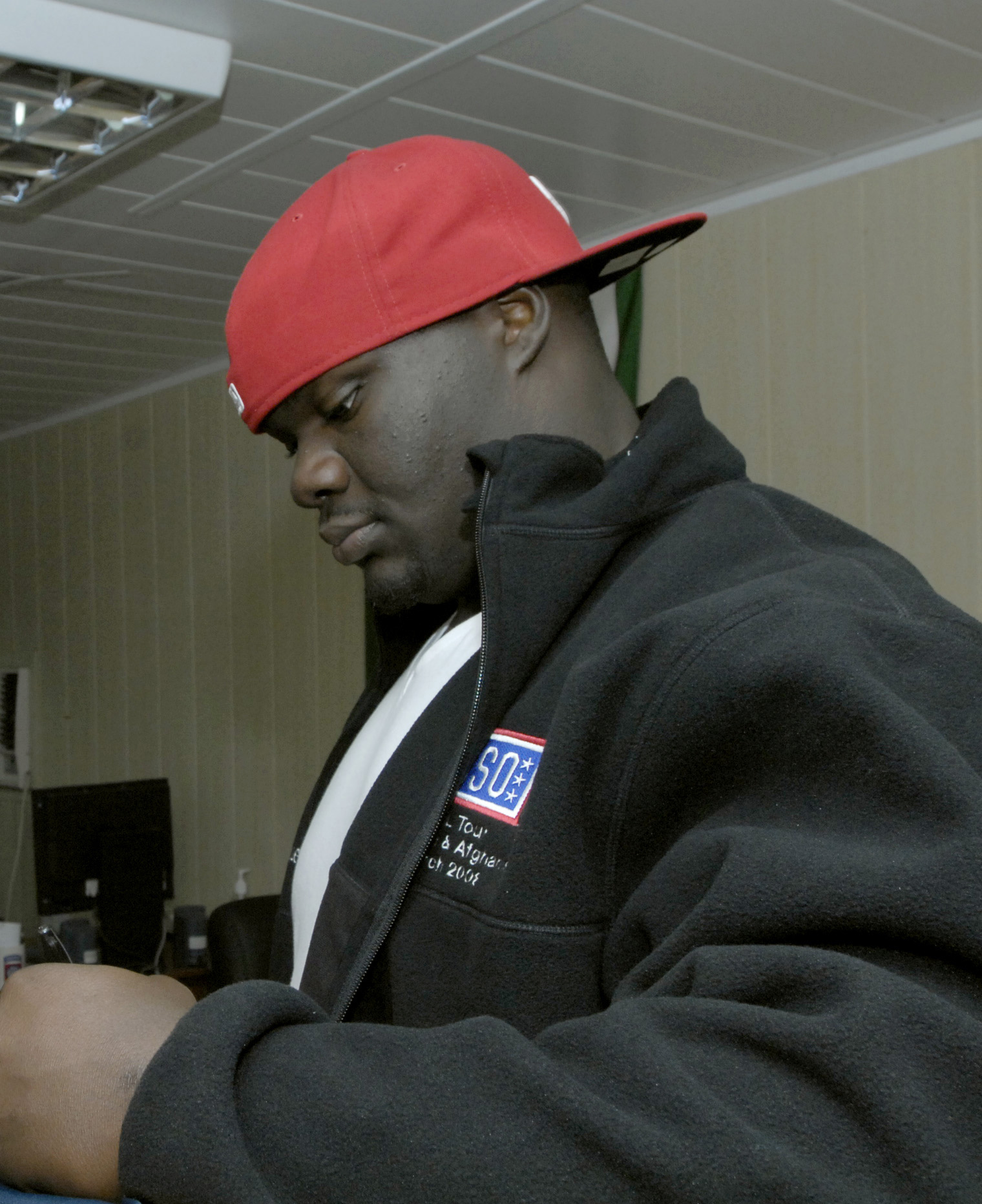
Harris at Manas Air Base

Harris' role with the Bears decreased after he re-injured his knee during week 6 of the 2009 season. Harris never fully recovered from the injury. On November 8, Harris was ejected just 65 seconds into the first quarter in a game against the Arizona Cardinals for punching guard Deuce Lutui in the face. He later apologized for the incident.

In 2010, Harris was benched after the second week of the season. Head coach Lovie Smith stated, "We have 45 guys that you can go with; we have everybody healthy right now. Just felt like we wanted to get a look at Marcus Harrison, him and Henry Melton inside, a little bit. Just performance based. Tommie's been doing everything we've asked him to do." The same week, former defensive tackle Warren Sapp criticized Harris, comparing him to "blind dog in a meat house." Harris struggled to retain his starting position throughout the season. He recorded his only sack of the season in week 17 against the Green Bay Packers. He finished the season with only 13 tackles and 1.5 sacks, his lowest during his time in Chicago.

The Bears released Harris after the season on February 28, 2011. Harris concluded his seven-year tenure with the Bears with 213 tackles, 28.5 sacks, and 5 forced fumbles in 104 games.

=== Indianapolis Colts ===
On August 2, 2011, Harris signed a one-year contract with the Indianapolis Colts, but was released on September 3.

=== San Diego Chargers ===
Harris signed with the San Diego Chargers on September 28, 2011 to reinforce the team's defensive line following injuries to Luis Castillo and Jacques Cesaire. He appeared in 13 games for the Chargers where he recorded 12 tackles and 3.5 sacks.

=== Retirement ===
Tommie Harris retired from football in 2012 to raise his children following his wife's unexpected death.

== NFL career statistics ==
Legend
**Bold**	Career high

Year	Team	GP	Tackles				Fumbles			Interceptions					
Year	Team	GP	Cmb	Solo	Ast	Sck	FF	FR	Yds	Int	Yds	Avg	Lng	TD	PD
2004	CHI	16	**43**	**58**	**15**	3.5	1	0	0	0	0	0.0	0	0	**2**
2005	CHI	16	32	37	5	3.0	**2**	**2**	0	0	0	0.0	0	0	0
2006	CHI	12	28	34	6	5.0	0	1	0	0	0	0.0	0	0	1
2007	CHI	16	36	41	5	**8.0**	**2**	0	0	0	0	0.0	0	0	0
2008	CHI	14	37	41	4	5.0	0	1	0	0	0	0.0	0	0	0
2009	CHI	15	24	29	5	2.5	0	1	0	**1**	**6**	**6.0**	**6**	0	1
2010	CHI	15	13	17	4	1.5	0	**2**	**9**	0	0	0.0	0	0	1
2011	SD	13	13	13	0	3.0	0	0	0	0	0	0.0	0	0	0
Career		117	226	182	44	31.5	5	7	0	1	6	6.0	6	0	5

== Post-retirement ==
Harris was the co-owner of the Texas Outlaws of the Fall Experimental Football League along with fellow NFL alum Eric Bassey. Harris donated $165,000 to pay for new equipment in the Lions Club Park Family Recreation and Senior Center in Killeen, Texas. The facility's recreation center was named after him to honor his donation.

== Personal life ==
Harris was mentored by NFL Hall of Famer Reggie White, whose influence significantly shaped his life and playing career. Harris remained close with the White family even after his death in 2004.

Harris married his wife, Ashley, in January 2012 and the couple had two children together. In February 2012, Ashley suddenly died of a brain aneurysm while undergoing a routine medical procedure. In 2016, Harris' daughter died of Sudden Infant Death Syndrome. In 2017, his agent, William G. Horn, was revealed to be stealing money from Harris' charity and using it for personal expenses, including entertainment and traveling. Horn was sentenced to 15 months in prison. In 2020, Harris' father, Tommie Sr., died following a one-year struggle with kidney failure. Harris published a book about coping with his personal struggles, titled Endure: Playing Through Life's Hardest Hits in 2021.

=== Legal troubles ===
Harris was arrested in Chicago and charged with indecent exposure, urinating in public and simple assault for threatening a police officer in 2012. He was arrested for trespassing in 2022 after refusing to leave the Omni Hotel in Oklahoma City.
