= Mark Anderson (American football) =

American football player (born 1983)

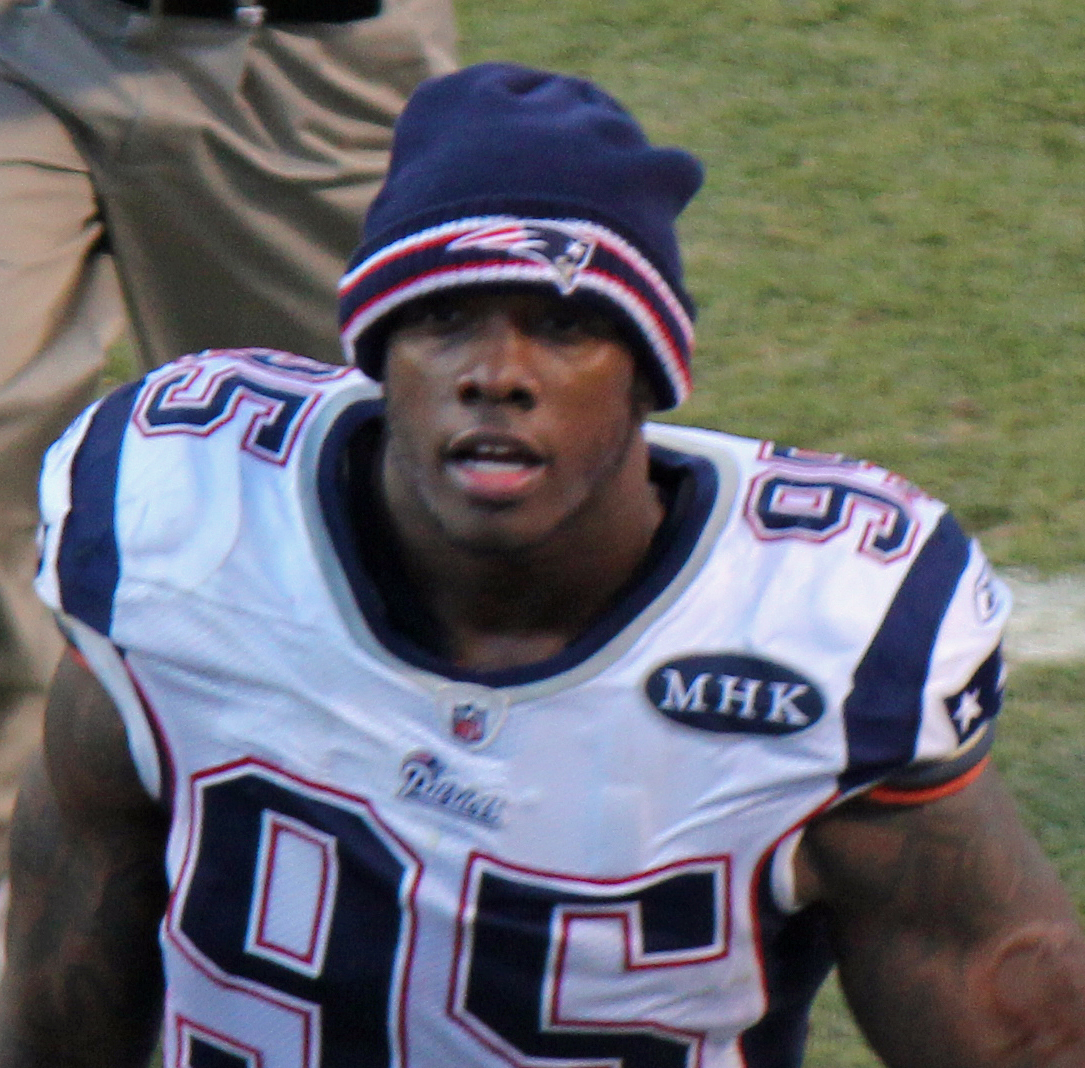
- Anderson with the New England Patriots in 2011

No. 97, 96, 95, 93
- Position: Defensive end

Personal information
- Born: May 26, 1983 (age 43); Tulsa, Oklahoma, U.S.
- Listed height: 6 ft 4 in (1.93 m)
- Listed weight: 255 lb (116 kg)

Career information
- High school: Booker T. Washington (Tulsa)
- College: Alabama (2001–2005)
- NFL draft: 2006: 5th round, 159th overall pick

Career history
- Chicago Bears (2006–2010); Houston Texans (2010); New England Patriots (2011); Buffalo Bills (2012)

Awards and highlights
- PFWA All-Rookie Team (2006); Second-team All-SEC (2005)

Career NFL statistics
- Total tackles: 175
- Sacks: 36.5
- Forced fumbles: 7
- Fumble recoveries: 3
- Pass deflections: 10
- Stats at Pro Football Reference

Mark Jay Anderson (born May 26, 1983) is an American former professional football player who was a defensive end in the National Football League (NFL). He was selected by the Chicago Bears in the fifth round of the 2006 NFL draft. He played college football for the Alabama Crimson Tide.

Anderson also played for the Houston Texans, New England Patriots and Buffalo Bills.

Anderson is an uncle to Rodney Anderson, former Oklahoma Sooners and Cincinnati Bengals running back.

Anderson was inducted into Booker T. Washington's 2022 Ring of Honor class during a ceremony between the Hornets’ basketball games against Bixby on Friday night, Feb 4, 2022 at Nathan E. Harris Fieldhouse.

== Early life ==
Anderson was born in Tulsa, Oklahoma. He attended Booker T. Washington High School in Tulsa, and was a letterman in football and basketball. He was a teammate in both sports of Robert Meachem and Felix Jones, both players who have played in the NFL. In football, he was an All-Metro selection and was named as a Big 12 Prep pick. Mark Anderson graduated from Booker T. Washington High School in 2001. Anderson recorded 104 tackles and 9 sacks along with 9 receptions and 3 touchdowns during his senior season to help the Hornets to an 11–2 record. In his best game he notched 20 tackles, 3 sacks and 2 blocked punts in 1 game as a senior.

== College years ==
Anderson attended the University of Alabama (where he became a member of Omega Psi Phi fraternity). He was a four-year letterwinner at Alabama (2002–05) starting 30 of 50 games, including the final 29 of his career, He finished with 141 career tackles, 13.5 sacks, 25 tackles for loss (TFL) (7th all-time at Alabama), 5 forced fumbles, 3 fumble recoveries and 2 passes deflected. He received second-team all-Southeastern Conference accolades as a senior after pacing Alabama with 7.5 sacks and 18 TFLs among 40 tackles while adding 1 forced fumble and 1 blocked field goal in 12 starts.

Anderson started every contest during junior campaign and ranked 8th on team with 41 tackles while contributing 11 TFLs, 1.5 sacks, 2 forced fumbles, 2 fumble recoveries and 2 passes deflected.

He earned Alabama's Billy Neighbors Most Improved Defensive Lineman award as a sophomore following spring practice and went on to register 47 tackles, 8 TFLs and 2.5 sacks while playing every game and starting 6. Anderson played every game during red-shirt freshman season, finishing with 13 tackles, 2 sacks, 1 TFL, 2 forced fumbles and 1 fumble recovery earning the Ozzie Newsome Most Improved Freshman award following spring practice. He graduated with a degree in consumer science.

== Professional career ==
=== Pre-draft ===
Pre-draft measurables
| Height | Weight | Arm length | Hand span | 40-yard dash | 10-yard split | 20-yard split | 20-yard shuttle | Three-cone drill | Vertical jump | Broad jump | Bench press |
|---|---|---|---|---|---|---|---|---|---|---|---|
| 6 ft 4 1/4 in (1.94 m) | 254 lb (115 kg) | 32 1/2 in (0.83 m) | 9 3/8 in (0.24 m) | 4.61 s | 1.55 s | 2.68 s | 4.22 s | 6.95 s | 42.0 in (1.07 m) | 10 ft 7 in (3.23 m) | 20 reps |
All values from NFL Combine

=== Chicago Bears ===
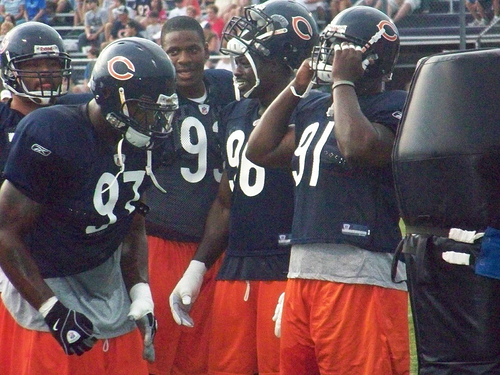
Anderson, along with Adewale Ogunleye, Alex Brown and Tommie Harris during training camp in 2008

Anderson was selected with the 159th overall pick (fifth round) in the 2006 NFL draft. Despite not being an official starter in the Bears Cover 2 defensive scheme, Anderson thrived in his role as a third-down pass rusher, and during the 2006 regular season he totaled 12 sacks, a Chicago Bears rookie record, which was previously held by Brian Urlacher. Anderson also received consideration in 2006 Defensive Rookie of the Year, finishing second in the voting to former Alabama teammate, DeMeco Ryans. He was named to Pro Football Weekly/Pro Football Writers Association All-Rookie team.

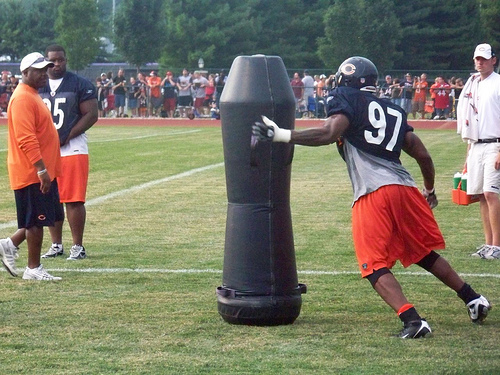
Anderson at Training Camp 2008

He played in all 16 regular season contests gathering 28 tackles to go along with 3 tackles-for-loss, 5 quarterback hits, 2 pass breakups, 4 forced fumbles and 1 fumble recovery. Also played in all 3 postseason contests, recording 4 tackles and 1.5 sacks. He combined with Alex Brown for 19 sacks in 2006, the most by a Chicago DE duo since Richard Dent and Trace Armstrong recorded 24 sacks in 1993. Anderson has recorded 4 multiple-sack games in 16 career regular season games played. He registered 0.5 sack in Super Bowl XLI and 1.5 sacks among 4 tackles in 3 postseason contests. He also recovered a fumble in Super Bowl XLI. He was voted NFL Defensive Rookie of the month in October 2006.

The Bears released Anderson on October 5, 2010.

=== Houston Texans ===
On October 6, 2010, Anderson signed with the Houston Texans, where he was reunited with his college teammate, DeMeco Ryans.

=== New England Patriots ===
On August 5, 2011, Anderson signed with the New England Patriots. Mark had a rebound year in New England, recording 10 sacks for the Patriots in the regular season. Anderson recorded 1.5 sacks and 5 tackles in Super Bowl XLVI.

=== Buffalo Bills ===
On March 21, 2012, Anderson signed a four-year contract worth 20 million dollars with the Buffalo Bills.

In the 2012 season, Anderson had 12 combined tackles and 1 sack through 5 games. However, he suffered a season-ending knee injury against the San Francisco 49ers on October 7, 2012.

On July 23, 2013, Anderson was released by the Bills after just one season.

== NFL career statistics ==
Legend
| **Bold** | Career high |

=== Regular season ===
| Year | Team | Games | | Tackles | | | | | Interceptions | | | | | Fumbles | | | |
| Year | Team | GP | GS | Cmb | Solo | Ast | Sck | TFL | Int | Yds | TD | Lng | PD | FF | FR | Yds | TD |
|---|---|---|---|---|---|---|---|---|---|---|---|---|---|---|---|---|---|
| 2006 | CHI | **16** | 1 | 28 | 23 | 5 | **12.0** | **9** | 0 | 0 | 0 | 0 | 2 | **4** | **1** | 0 | 0 |
| 2007 | CHI | 14 | **14** | **31** | **25** | 6 | 5.0 | 6 | 0 | 0 | 0 | 0 | 1 | 1 | 0 | 0 | 0 |
| 2008 | CHI | **16** | 0 | 18 | 10 | 8 | 1.0 | 2 | 0 | 0 | 0 | 0 | **3** | 0 | **1** | 0 | 0 |
| 2009 | CHI | **16** | 2 | 28 | 22 | 6 | 3.5 | 6 | 0 | 0 | 0 | 0 | 0 | 0 | 0 | 0 | 0 |
| 2010 | CHI | 4 | 1 | 8 | 8 | 0 | 0.0 | 1 | 0 | 0 | 0 | 0 | 0 | 0 | 0 | 0 | 0 |
| 2010 | HOU | 11 | 2 | 21 | 16 | 5 | 4.0 | 6 | 0 | 0 | 0 | 0 | 2 | 0 | 0 | 0 | 0 |
| 2011 | NWE | **16** | 1 | 29 | 18 | **11** | 10.0 | **9** | 0 | 0 | 0 | 0 | 1 | 2 | **1** | 0 | 0 |
| 2012 | BUF | 5 | 4 | 12 | 10 | 2 | 1.0 | 2 | 0 | 0 | 0 | 0 | 1 | 0 | 0 | 0 | 0 |
| Career | | 98 | 25 | 175 | 132 | 43 | 36.5 | 41 | 0 | 0 | 0 | 0 | 10 | 7 | 3 | 0 | 0 |

=== Playoffs ===
| Year | Team | Games | | Tackles | | | | | Interceptions | | | | | Fumbles | | | |
| Year | Team | GP | GS | Cmb | Solo | Ast | Sck | TFL | Int | Yds | TD | Lng | PD | FF | FR | Yds | TD |
|---|---|---|---|---|---|---|---|---|---|---|---|---|---|---|---|---|---|
| 2006 | CHI | **3** | 0 | 4 | 3 | 1 | 1.5 | 0 | 0 | 0 | 0 | 0 | 0 | **1** | **1** | **2** | 0 |
| 2011 | NWE | **3** | **2** | **11** | **6** | **5** | **2.5** | **3** | 0 | 0 | 0 | 0 | **1** | 0 | 0 | 0 | 0 |
| Career | | 6 | 2 | 15 | 9 | 6 | 4.0 | 3 | 0 | 0 | 0 | 0 | 1 | 1 | 1 | 2 | 0 |

== Post-playing career ==
On July 31, 2015, Anderson was hired by former Bears head coach and Tampa Bay Buccaneers HC Lovie Smith as a scouting department member.
