= Mike Brown (safety) =

American football player (born 1978)

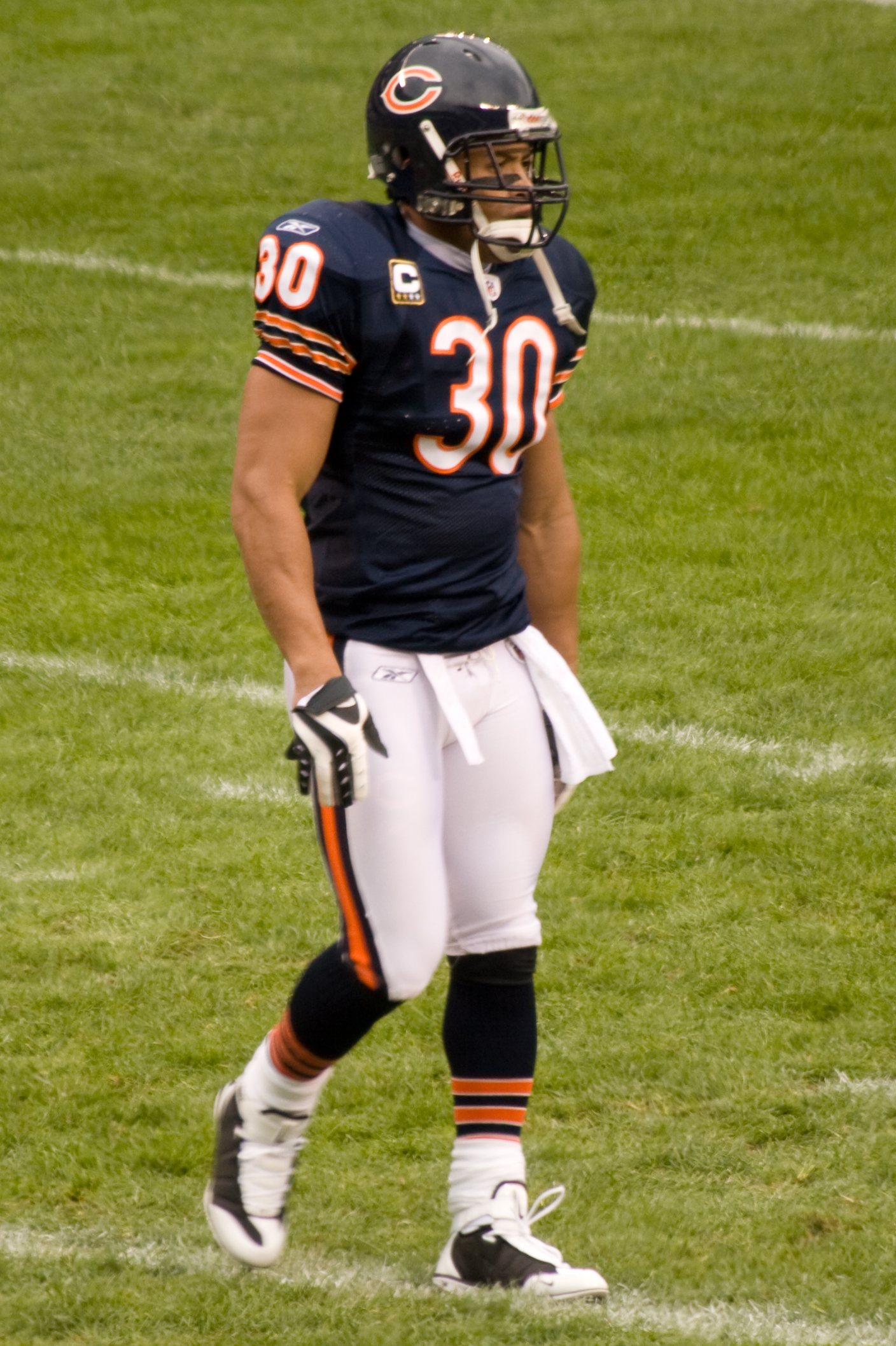
- Brown with the Chicago Bears in 2008

No. 30
- Position: Safety

Personal information
- Born: February 13, 1978 (age 48); Scottsdale, Arizona, U.S.
- Listed height: 5 ft 10 in (1.78 m)
- Listed weight: 207 lb (94 kg)

Career information
- High school: Saguaro (Scottsdale)
- College: Nebraska
- NFL draft: 2000: 2nd round, 39th overall pick

Career history
- Chicago Bears (2000–2008); Kansas City Chiefs (2009)

Awards and highlights
- First-team All-Pro (2001); Second-team All-Pro (2005); Pro Bowl (2005); SI 2000s NFL All-Decade Team (2nd); PFWA All-Rookie Team (2000); 100 greatest Bears of All-Time; Bowl Alliance national champion (1997); First-team All-American (1999); 2× Second-team All-Big 12 (1997, 1998)

Career NFL statistics
- Total tackles: 616
- Sacks: 7
- Forced fumbles: 8
- Fumble recoveries: 8
- Interceptions: 20
- Total touchdowns: 7
- Stats at Pro Football Reference

Mike Brown (born February 13, 1978) is an American former professional football player who was a safety for 10 seasons in the National Football League (NFL). He played college football for the Nebraska Cornhuskers and was selected by the Chicago Bears in the second round of the 2000 NFL draft. Brown was ranked #49 in ESPN Chicago's "50 Greatest Bears" poll in 2012.

== Early life ==
Mike Brown graduated from Saguaro High School in Scottsdale, Arizona in 1996, where he played both football and baseball.

In football, he was an All-State choice and ranked the top defensive back prospect in the country by SuperPrep, and named Arizona Player-of-the-Year by every major publication. Mike Brown was named the state's top running back and defensive back by The Arizona Republic, which was the first time in 10 years a player received both awards. Mike rushed for 2,036 yards (9.6 avg.) and 31 touchdowns as a senior.

In baseball, he played center field and was an All-State choice as a senior, after batting .426, and posting 27 stolen bases.

== College career ==
Brown played cornerback as a freshman before playing both safety positions in his final three seasons. As a junior, he set Nebraska single-season record for tackles by a defensive back with a career-high 102 and was named to all-Big 12 first-team. Brown enjoyed his greatest season as senior in which he was first-team all-America selection by Associated Press and Football Writers Association and a unanimous all-Big Twelve first-team pick and academic all-American. He started every game and finished the year leading the Huskers with 96 tackles while adding two sacks, one fumble recovery, six forced fumbles and five interceptions, five passes defended.

== Professional career ==
Pre-draft measurables
| Height | Weight | Arm length | Hand span | 40-yard dash | 10-yard split | 20-yard split | 20-yard shuttle | Three-cone drill | Vertical jump | Broad jump | Bench press |
|---|---|---|---|---|---|---|---|---|---|---|---|
| 5 ft 9 7/8 in (1.77 m) | 204 lb (93 kg) | 30 1/2 in (0.77 m) | 9 1/8 in (0.23 m) | 4.53 s | 1.57 s | 2.64 s | 4.01 s | 6.93 s | 36 in (0.91 m) | 9 ft 8 in (2.95 m) | 14 reps |
All values from NFL Combine

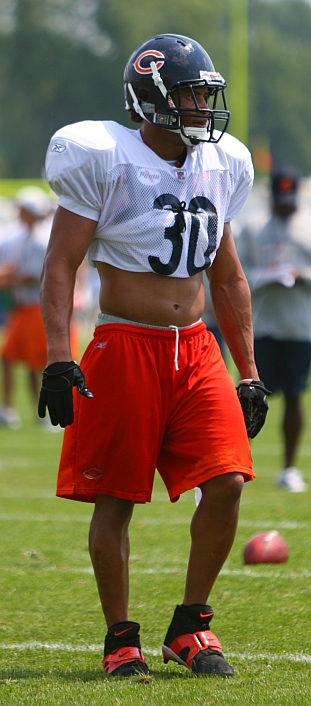
Mike Brown at the Chicago Bears 2007 Training Camp.

The Chicago Bears drafted Brown in the second round with the 39th overall pick in the 2000 NFL draft. Brown was the only rookie to play in the 2000 season’s opener, eventually becoming the team's starting free safety for all sixteen games of the season. He recorded the second most tackles on the team that year and one interception that was returned for a touchdown. He received accolades from Pro Football Weekly, Football News and Football Digest, but lost the NFL Defensive Rookie of the Year Award to teammate Brian Urlacher. In 2001, he had two memorable performances, during which he returned two interceptions for two consecutive overtime wins, making him the first player in league history to accomplish the feat. In Week 7, Brown intercepted a pass that Terrell Owens bobbled and returned it for a game-winning touchdown against the San Francisco 49ers. The following week, Brown intercepted a tipped pass from Cleveland Browns quarterback Tim Couch and returned it for another game-winning touchdown. He is the only player to have back-to-back game-winning touchdown returns in overtime in NFL history. The 2001 Bears finished the season with a 13–3 record and one of the league's most prominent defenses. Brown recorded a team leading five interceptions. However, the Philadelphia Eagles defeated the team in the postseason's second round.

Brown recorded three interceptions and 111 tackles in 2002, despite sustaining a hand injury during the off season. One of his most notable performances came when he returned a fumble for a 68-yard touchdown, following a fumble and lateral pass from Rosevelt Colvin. In addition to the return he had forced three fumbles that season. However, Brown only intercepted two passes during the 2003 season, and tied for third among tackles on the team.

After sustaining an Achilles injury in 2004, which forced him to miss the last 14 games, and a calf-injury in 2005 which made him miss the last four games of 2005, the Bears defense was noticeably less effective. Brown tried to play in a January 2006 Divisional Playoff game for the Bears against the Carolina Panthers, but had to leave the game in the first quarter. The Panthers would go on to win the game, 29–21. During week six of the 2006 Chicago Bears season, Brown suffered a Lisfranc fracture. The ailment forced him to undergo surgery, and sent him to Bears' injured reserve for the remainder of the season.

Brown is also noted by teammates and coaches for his on-field coaching ability. He made the NFL transitions much easier for his fellow safeties Chris Harris and Danieal Manning by making sure they were in the correct positions. Brian Urlacher often referred to him as the actual leader of the defense. Brown returned to the field during the 2007 season's mini-camp, making a recovery much earlier than expected. Brown recorded an interception during the 2007 season's opener against the San Diego Chargers. However, he sustained a knee injury after Lorenzo Neal horse-collar tackled him. Brown returned to the locker room, and emotionally stated that something in his knee did not feel right. Further medical examination confirmed that Brown would miss the remainder of the season.

Neal, who knew he was at fault immediately after the play, apologized to Brown and the media. Brian Urlacher, one of Brown's longtime teammates and friends, stated he was unsure whether Brown would attempt another comeback.

The Bears reached an agreement with Brown on a restructured contract on May 20, 2008. The restructured deal would protect Chicago if Brown got hurt for the fourth time in his career. He would still collect his annual $2.44 million, but only $950,000 of it would be guaranteed for being on the Week 1 roster. The rest of the payout would have been based on playing time. If Brown got injured in preseason, he would only receive $320,000. Brown sustained a calf injury during the Bears' second-to-last game of the 2008 season, and was subsequently placed on the injury reserve. Brown was just one game away from completing his first full season in more than four years.

On February 14, 2009, the Chicago Bears announced that they would not offer a contract to Mike Brown. He then signed with the Kansas City Chiefs on June 24. Brown started in all 16 games for the Chiefs, recording three interceptions and 79 tackles.

== Career statistics ==
=== NFL ===
| Year | Team | GP | Tackles | | | | Fumbles | | | | Interceptions | | | | | |
| Year | Team | GP | Cmb | Solo | Ast | Sck | FF | FR | Yds | TD | Int | Yds | Avg | Lng | TD | PD |
|---|---|---|---|---|---|---|---|---|---|---|---|---|---|---|---|---|
| 2000 | CHI | 16 | 97 | 79 | 18 | 0.0 | 1 | 1 | 12 | 0 | 1 | 35 | 35.0 | 35 | 1 | 1 |
| 2001 | CHI | 16 | 67 | 55 | 12 | 3.0 | 2 | 1 | 5 | 0 | 5 | 81 | 16.2 | 33 | 2 | 11 |
| 2002 | CHI | 16 | 90 | 75 | 15 | 0.0 | 3 | 2 | 106 | 1 | 3 | 16 | 5.3 | 16 | 0 | 8 |
| 2003 | CHI | 16 | 76 | 62 | 14 | 0.0 | 0 | 0 | 0 | 0 | 2 | 0 | 0.0 | 0 | 0 | 6 |
| 2004 | CHI | 2 | 10 | 9 | 1 | 0.0 | 0 | 1 | 95 | 1 | 0 | 0 | 0.0 | 0 | 0 | 1 |
| 2005 | CHI | 12 | 72 | 63 | 9 | 1.0 | 1 | 0 | 0 | 0 | 3 | 116 | 38.7 | 72 | 1 | 6 |
| 2006 | CHI | 6 | 24 | 19 | 5 | 0.0 | 1 | 1 | 3 | 1 | 0 | 0 | 0.0 | 0 | 0 | 1 |
| 2007 | CHI | 1 | 4 | 2 | 2 | 0.0 | 0 | 1 | 0 | 0 | 1 | 27 | 27.0 | 27 | 0 | 2 |
| 2008 | CHI | 15 | 73 | 57 | 16 | 1.0 | 0 | 0 | 0 | 0 | 2 | 0 | 0.0 | 0 | 0 | 8 |
| 2009 | KC | 16 | 103 | 79 | 24 | 2.0 | 0 | 1 | 0 | 0 | 3 | 13 | 4.3 | 10 | 0 | 3 |
| Career | | 116 | 616 | 500 | 116 | 7.0 | 8 | 8 | 221 | 3 | 20 | 288 | 14.4 | 72 | 4 | 47 |

=== College ===
| Year | School | G | GS | Tackles | | | | | Interceptions | | | |
| Year | School | G | GS | Solo | Ast | Tot | Sacks | Sacks-Yards | Int | PD | FF | FR |
|---|---|---|---|---|---|---|---|---|---|---|---|---|
| 1996 | Nebraska | 12 | 0 | 8 | 4 | 12 | 0 | 0 | 1 | 1 | 0 | 0 |
| 1997 | Nebraska | 13 | 13 | 41 | 41 | 82 | 0 | 0 | 2 | 4 | 0 | 0 |
| 1998 | Nebraska | 13 | 13 | 45 | 70 | 115 | 0 | 0 | 1 | 4 | 0 | 1 |
| 1999 | Nebraska | 13 | 13 | 61 | 42 | 103 | 2 | 2-20 | 6 | 7 | 6 | 1 |

Notes - Statistics include bowl game performances.
