= Desmond Clark =

American football player (born 1977)

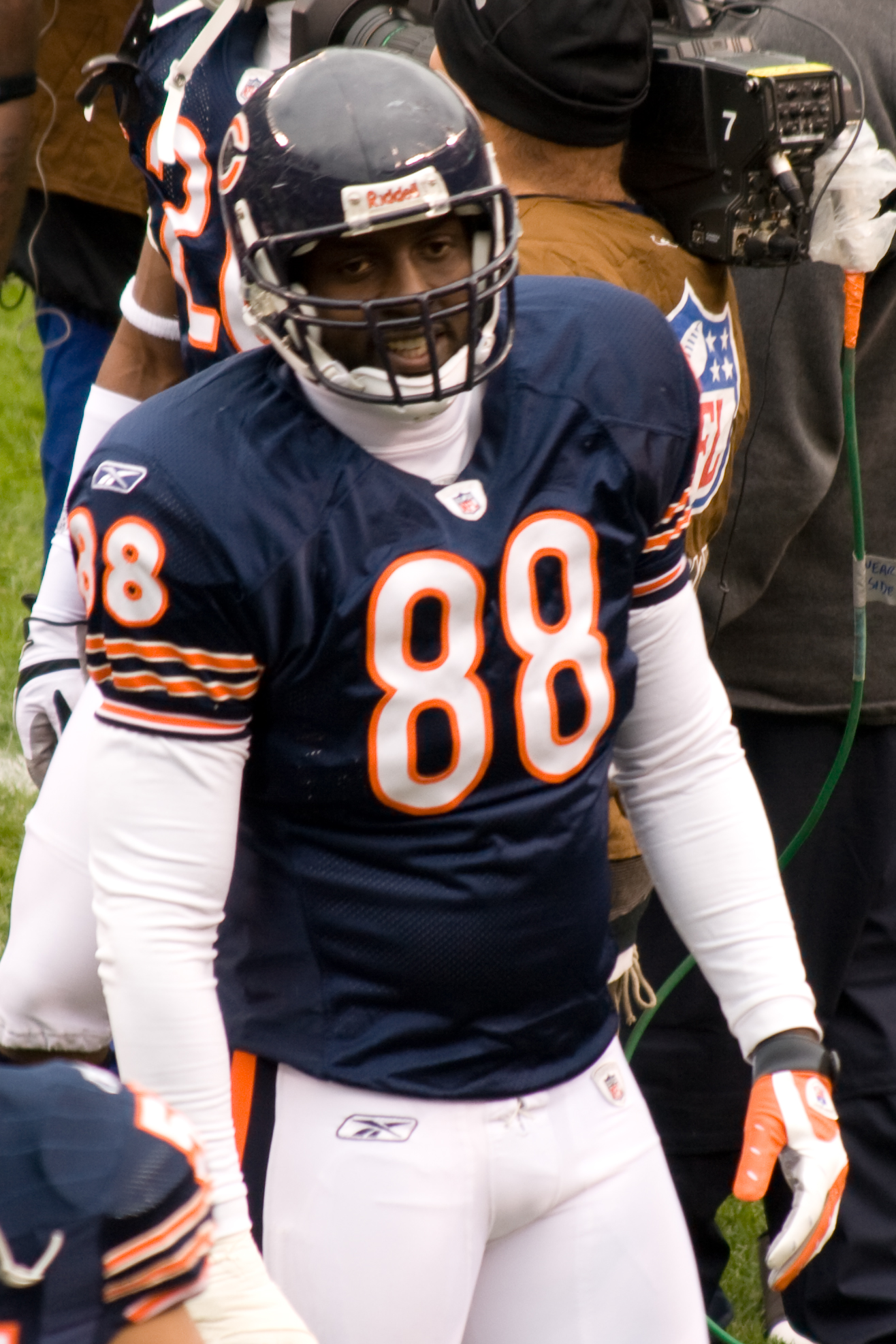
- Clark with the Bears in 2008

No. 88, 85
- Position: Tight end

Personal information
- Born: April 20, 1977 (age 49); Bartow, Florida, U.S.
- Listed height: 6 ft 3 in (1.91 m)
- Listed weight: 249 lb (113 kg)

Career information
- High school: Kathleen (Lakeland, Florida)
- College: Wake Forest (1995–1998)
- NFL draft: 1999: 6th round, 179th overall pick

Career history
- Denver Broncos (1999–2001); Miami Dolphins (2002); Chicago Bears (2003–2010)

Awards and highlights
- 2× Second-team All-ACC (1996, 1998)

Career NFL statistics
- Receptions: 323
- Receiving yards: 3,591
- Receiving touchdowns: 27
- Stats at Pro Football Reference

Desmond Darice Clark (born April 20, 1977) is an American former professional football player who was a tight end in the National Football League (NFL). He played college football for the Wake Forest Demon Deacons. Clark was selected by the Denver Broncos in the sixth round of the 1999 NFL draft. He also played for the Miami Dolphins and Chicago Bears.

== Early life ==
Clark attended Kathleen High School, where he played football as a quarterback, free safety, and return specialist. He was also the holder for former Chicago Bears place kicker Paul Edinger. He also played basketball and baseball during his high school years. His brother, Dominique Davis, played quarterback at East Carolina University and professionally in the Canadian Football League.

== College career ==
Clark attended Wake Forest University, where he was a wide receiver and caught at least one pass against every ACC opponent he faced. He was a two-time second-team All-ACC selection, a two-time team MVP, and finished his career as the ACC all-time leading receiver with 216 receptions for 2834 yards (13.12 yards per rec. avg.) and twenty touchdowns.

== Professional career ==
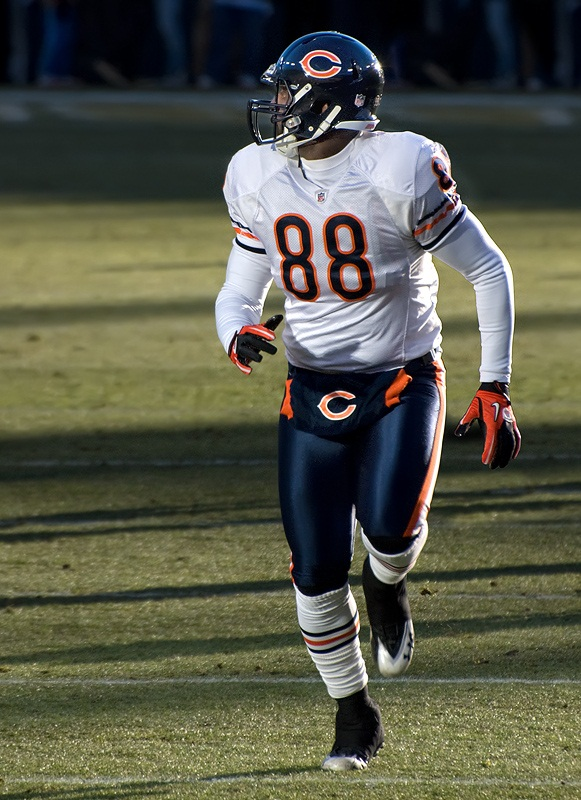
Desmond Clark during the Bears game against the Packers on January 2, 2011.

The Denver Broncos drafted Clark in the sixth round of the 1999 NFL draft, where he was converted to tight end, behind Shannon Sharpe, Dwayne Carswell and Byron Chamberlain on the depth chart. He played with them for three seasons, until the team waived him during the 2002 preseason. Clark, who was nursing an arm injury, was signed by the Miami Dolphins, and spent one season with them before joining the Chicago Bears in 2003. In 2005 Clark was selected as a Pro Bowl alternate. In 2006, Clark helped the Bears win the NFC Championship and a trip to Super Bowl XLI with regular season statistics of 626 receiving yards on 45 catches and six touchdowns.

On February 24, 2008, the Bears awarded Clark with a two-year extension. During the 2008 season, Clark caught 41 passes from Kyle Orton and recorded 367 receiving yards and one touchdown. With the emergence of fellow tight end Greg Olsen, Clark dropped to the number two tight end on the team's depth chart. Clark suffered a back injury during the team's 2009 season opener against the Green Bay Packers, and missed five starts. He accumulated 19 receptions, 145 receiving yards, and two touchdowns in this injury-shortened season.

In 2010, Mike Martz was hired to replace Ron Turner as the Bears offensive coordinator. Clark's role in the Bears offense began to diminish, as he spent most of his time on the team's inactive list. He recorded just one reception for twelve yards. The Bears won the NFC North, but lost the NFC Championship to the Green Bay Packers. After the game, Clark, who was on the final year of his contract, stated he was not sure if the team would offer him an extension.

Clark re-signed with the Bears on August 2, 2011, but was later released on September 3, 2011. At the end of his tenure with the Bears, Clark ranked second all-time in tight end receptions for the team with 242, trailing only Hall of Famer Mike Ditka.

Clark retired from football in September 2012. After a meeting with the Bears community relations department regarding his youth foundation, he was escorted from the premises of Halas Hall by security. Clark said that "he was viewed as an uninvited free agent, not a former member of the Bears' family." Clark told the Chicago Tribune, "I was like, 'Are you serious?', so what I did, just so I could have a relationship with the team was, I wrote them a letter saying my intentions were to never play again and that I was officially retired from football."

== 88 Wayz Youth Organization ==
88 Wayz, a non-profit school program started by Clark in 2008, provides a free mentor/leadership program for Polk County-area and Chicago-area schools. 88 Wayz assists youth in realizing their dreams and reaching their full potential by mentoring, motivating, and developing the confidence needed to achieve and become productive adults. 88 Wayz utilizes T.A.L.K.S. Mentoring, an innovative, cognitive-behavioral approach to youth mentoring that focuses on leadership skill development through peer-to-peer and youth-adult interactions. 88 Wayz is delivering its program in 12 schools. 88 Wayz is based in Lakeland, FL.

== Personal life ==
Clark and former teammate Alex Brown hosted the Dez Clark & Alex Brown Show.

Clark was a broadcaster. Clark is now a financial adviser for Wayne Messmer & Associates and President of NFL Alumni, Chicago Chapter.

On August 29, 2015, Clark and his wife, Maria, were arrested following a dispute at Vernon Hills High School. Clark was charged with disorderly-conduct, while his wife was charged with two counts of battery. Clark and his wife were arrested following a meeting with the school's administration to discuss their son's exclusion from participating in certain school activities due to his disciplinary record. Clark pleaded guilty in April 2016 to the charge of disorderly conduct.
