= D'Anton Lynn =

American gridiron football player and coach (born 1989)

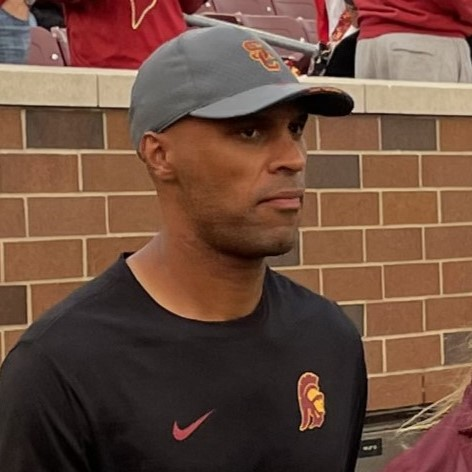
- Lynn in 2024

Penn State Nittany Lions
- Title: Defensive coordinator

Personal information
- Born: October 24, 1989 (age 37); Plano, Texas, U.S.
- Listed height: 6 ft 1 in (1.85 m)
- Listed weight: 208 lb (94 kg)

Career information
- High school: Celina (Celina, Texas)
- College: Penn State
- NFL draft: 2012: undrafted

Career history

Playing
- New York Jets (2012)*; Hamilton Tiger-Cats (2013)*
- * Offseason or practice squad member only

Coaching
- New York Jets (2014) Seasonal intern; Buffalo Bills (2015–2016) Defensive assistant; Los Angeles Chargers (2017) Defensive assistant; Houston Texans (2018–2019) Assistant secondary coach; Houston Texans (2020) Secondary coach; Baltimore Ravens (2021–2022) Safeties coach; UCLA (2023) Defensive coordinator; USC (2024–2025) Defensive coordinator; Penn State (2026–present) Defensive coordinator

Anthony Ray "D'Anton" Lynn II (born October 24, 1989) is an American football coach who is currently the defensive coordinator for Penn State, his alma mater. He previously served as the defensive coordinator for UCLA and USC.

Lynn played college football as a cornerback for the Penn State Nittany Lions, and was signed as an undrafted free agent by the New York Jets in 2012. He became an assistant coach with the Jets, Buffalo Bills and Los Angeles Chargers before becoming the secondary coach for the Houston Texans. Lynn then served as the defensive backs coach for the Baltimore Ravens in 2021 before being elevated in 2022 to their safeties coach. He became the UCLA defensive coordinator in 2023, leaving for USC after the regular season. In 2025, he was named the defensive coordinator at Penn State, his alma mater.

== Playing career ==
=== High school ===
Lynn attended Celina High School in Celina, Texas. Lynn also played defensive back, linebacker, quarterback, running back and wide receiver at Celina High School. He was selected for the Associated Press Class 3A first-team all-state.

College recruiting
Name	Hometown	School	Height	Weight	40^{‡}	Commit date
D'Anton Lynn; Safety	Celina, Texas	Celina High School	6 ft 1 in (1.85 m)	177 lb (80 kg)	4.48	Nov 10, 2007
D'Anton Lynn; Safety	Recruit ratings: Scout: Rivals:					
Overall recruit ranking: Scout: 15 (S) Rivals: 29 (Safety), 51 (TX)
Note: In many cases, Scout, Rivals, 247Sports, On3, and ESPN may conflict in their listings of height and weight.; In these cases, the average was taken. ESPN grades are on a 100-point scale.; Sources: "Penn State Football Commitments". Rivals.; "2008 Penn State Football Commits". Scout.; "2008 Penn State Nittany Lions commits". ESPN.; "Scout.com Team Recruiting Rankings". Scout.; "2008 Team Ranking". Rivals.com.

=== College ===
Lynn played four seasons as a cornerback at Pennsylvania State University. During his tenure with the Nittany Lions, he recorded 162 tackles, 7 tackles for loss, 4 interceptions, 1 fumble recovery. He received honorable mention three times for the All-Big Ten team.

In his freshman year, on October 11, 2008, he just had 2 tackles against Wisconsin and Penn State won 48–7. As a sophomore, he won the starting cornerback position. On October 31, 2009, he recorded 8 tackles against Northwestern as Penn State won 34–13.

In his junior year, Lynn started every single game at cornerback. He finished the season with 75 tackles, 3 interceptions and 7 passes defensed. On September 11, 2010, he recorded 5 tackles in a loss to No. 1 ranked Alabama by the score of 24–3. The next game on September 18, 2010, he had 2 tackles and an interception against Kent State and Penn State won 24–0. On October 23, 2010, he record 10 tackles, one interception and 2 passes defended against Minnesota and Penn State won 33–21.

=== National Football League ===
==== 2012 NFL Combine ====
Pre-draft measurables
Height	Weight	Arm length	Hand span	40-yard dash	Vertical jump	Broad jump	Bench press
6 ft 0 in (1.83 m)	206 lb (93 kg)	29 3/4 in (0.76 m)	8 1/2 in (0.22 m)	4.77 s	31.5 in (0.80 m)	9 ft 3 in (2.82 m)	17.0 reps
All values from the NFL Combine

==== New York Jets ====
On April 29, 2012, Lynn signed with New York Jets as an undrafted free agent and reuniting him with his father Anthony Lynn who was at the time the Jets running backs coach. On August 31, 2012, he was released.

=== Canadian Football League ===
==== Hamilton Tiger Cats ====
On May 24, 2013, Lynn signed with the Hamilton Tiger-Cats of the Canadian Football League. On June 2, 2013, Lynn was released.

== Coaching career ==
=== New York Jets ===
In 2014, Lynn served as a seasonal intern for the New York Jets, after serving in the team's scouting department in 2013.

=== Buffalo Bills ===
On January 26, 2015, Lynn was hired by the Buffalo Bills as a defensive assistant.

=== Los Angeles Chargers ===
On February 2, 2017, Lynn was hired by the Los Angeles Chargers as a defensive assistant.

=== Houston Texans ===
On February 7, 2018, Lynn was hired by the Houston Texans as their assistant defensive backs coach under head coach Bill O’Brien. On January 29, 2020, Lynn was promoted to the team's secondary coach.

=== Baltimore Ravens ===
On January 24, 2021, Lynn was hired by the Baltimore Ravens as their defensive backs coach under defensive coordinator Don Martindale and head coach John Harbaugh.

On January 20, 2022, Lynn was selected as head coach of the East squad in the 2022 East-West Shrine Bowl held in Las Vegas.

=== UCLA Bruins ===
On February 27, 2023, Lynn was hired by UCLA to become their defensive coordinator, replacing Bill McGovern. Lynn's two-year contract at $1.02 million per year was the richest in the program's history for an assistant at his position. He inherited a defense that finished the past five seasons Nos. 86, 70, 69, 113, and 102 in the nation in total defense. Under Lynn in 2023, the Bruins defense improved to No. 11 in the regular season, allowing just 299 yards per game. It was fewest yards allowed in the Pac-12 Conference, and they also surrendered the second-fewest points. On November 18 against their crosstown rivals, USC, the Bruins won 38–20, with the defense holding the Trojans to their lowest scoring output of the season along with three yards rushing, USC's worst ground performance since 2018.

=== USC Trojans ===
On December 1, 2023, USC hired Lynn as their defensive coordinator after having fired their previous coordinator, Alex Grinch, midseason on November 5. Lynn left UCLA before they were invited to the LA Bowl.

=== Penn State Nittany Lions ===
On December 29, 2025, Lynn was hired as the defensive coordinator at Penn State University.

== Personal life ==
Lynn is the son of former Los Angeles Chargers head coach, and current Washington Commanders run game coordinator/running backs coach, Anthony Lynn.
