= Big Sandy Independent School District (Upshur County, Texas) =

School district in Texas

Location
- Big Sandy, Texas ESC Region 7 USA
- Coordinates: 30°29′17″N 95°59′44″W

District information
- Type: Independent school district
- Motto: Higher Expectations for All!
- Grades: Pre-K through 12
- Superintendent: Mike Burns
- Schools: 4 (2009-10)
- NCES District ID: 4808230

Students and staff
- Students: 711 (2010-11)
- Teachers: 71.06 (2009-10) (on full-time equivalent (FTE) basis)
- Student–teacher ratio: 9.91 (2009-10)
- Athletic conference: UIL Class 1A Football Division I
- District mascot: Wildcats
- Colors: Blue, Gold

Other information
- TEA District Accountability Rating for 2011: Academically Acceptable
- Website: Big Sandy ISD

Big Sandy Independent School District is a public school district based in Big Sandy, Texas (USA). The district is located in southwestern Upshur County and extends into a small portion of Wood County.

== Finances ==
As of the 2010-2011 school year, the appraised valuation of property in the district was $177,403,000. The maintenance tax rate was $0.104 and the bond tax rate was $0.028 per $100 of appraised valuation.

== Academic achievement ==
In 2011, the school district was rated "academically acceptable" by the Texas Education Agency.

== Schools ==
In the 2011-2012 school year, the district had four open schools.

=== Regular instructional ===
- Big Sandy High School
- Big Sandy Junior High
- Big Sandy Elementary

=== Alternative instructional ===
- Upshur County Alternative School

== Special programs ==
=== Athletics ===
The Big Sandy High School football team has won three Texas Class B (now Class A) state championships; 1973, 1974 (co-championship with Celina after the finals game ended in a 0-0 tie), and 1975. The 1975 team set a then national record of 824 points scored in a season (they went 14-0 for the regular season including playoffs), while giving up only 15 points (and only being behind in a game only one time, an early 2-0 deficit to Groom in the championship game, which also were the only points given up to any opponent in its three state title games). This record was not broken until 1994 by a high school in Bloomington, California. The 1975 team included later notable NFL stars such as David Overstreet, a former running back for the Oklahoma Sooners and the Miami Dolphins, and Lovie Smith, head coach for the NFL Chicago Bears.

In 2005, the Wildcats again reached the state final game (Class A, vs Stratford), however they fell short by one point (21-20).

== See also ==
- List of school districts in Texas
