= Jordan Roos =

American football player (born 1993)

Profile
- Position: Guard

Personal information
- Born: July 6, 1993 (age 33); Celina, Texas, U.S.
- Listed height: 6 ft 3 in (1.91 m)
- Listed weight: 302 lb (137 kg)

Career information
- High school: Celina
- College: Purdue
- NFL draft: 2017: undrafted

Career history
- Seattle Seahawks (2017–2019); Las Vegas Raiders (2020)*; New England Patriots (2020)*; Tennessee Titans (2021–2023)
- * Offseason or practice squad member only

Career NFL statistics
- Games played: 21
- Games started: 3
- Stats at Pro Football Reference

Jordan A. Roos (born July 6, 1993) is an American professional football guard who is currently a free agent. He played college football at Purdue and was signed with the Seattle Seahawks as an undrafted free agent following the 2017 NFL draft. Roos attended Celina High School in Celina, Texas.

== College career ==
Roos played for the Purdue Boilermakers from 2012 to 2016, starting all games during his final three and a half years. He played in 47 games, with 42 starts at right guard.

== Professional career ==
Pre-draft measurables
Height	Weight	Arm length	Hand span	40-yard dash	10-yard split	20-yard split	20-yard shuttle	Three-cone drill	Vertical jump	Broad jump	Bench press
6 ft 3 5/8 in (1.92 m)	302 lb (137 kg)	32 3/8 in (0.82 m)	9 1/4 in (0.23 m)	5.22 s	1.82 s	2.97 s	4.78 s	7.47 s	28.5 in (0.72 m)	8 ft 10 in (2.69 m)	41 reps
All values from Purdue's Pro Day

=== Seattle Seahawks ===
After going undrafted in the 2017 NFL draft, Roos signed as an undrafted free agent with the Seattle Seahawks on April 29, 2017. Roos played in all four of the Seahawks preseason games and made their regular season 53-man roster.

On September 1, 2018, Roos was waived by the Seahawks and was re-signed to the practice squad. He signed a reserve/future contract on January 7, 2019.

On August 31, 2019, Roos was waived by the Seahawks and was signed to the practice squad the next day. He was promoted to the active roster on October 11, 2019.

On October 23, 2019, Roos was waived by the Seahawks and re-signed to the practice squad. He was promoted back to the active roster on October 29.

Roos re-signed with the Seahawks on April 21, 2020. He was released on July 26, 2020.

=== Las Vegas Raiders ===
On July 27, 2020, Roos was claimed off waivers by the Las Vegas Raiders. He was waived on September 1, 2020.

=== New England Patriots ===
On October 1, 2020, Roos was signed to the New England Patriots practice squad. He was released on October 27.

=== Tennessee Titans ===
On August 7, 2021, Roos signed with the Tennessee Titans. He was waived on August 31, 2021, and re-signed to the practice squad. After the Titans were eliminated in the Divisional Round of the 2021 playoffs, he signed a reserve/future contract on January 24, 2022.

On August 30, 2022, Roos was waived by the Titans and signed to the practice squad the next day. He was promoted to the active roster on October 1. He was waived again on December 10. He was re-signed to the practice squad four days later. He was promoted to the active roster on December 17.

Roos was waived on August 29, 2023, and re-signed to the practice squad. He was released on September 14. Roos was re-signed to the practice squad on December 19. He was not signed to a reserve/future contract and thus became a free agent when his contract expired at the end of the season.
