= Anthony Lynn =

American football player and coach (born 1968)

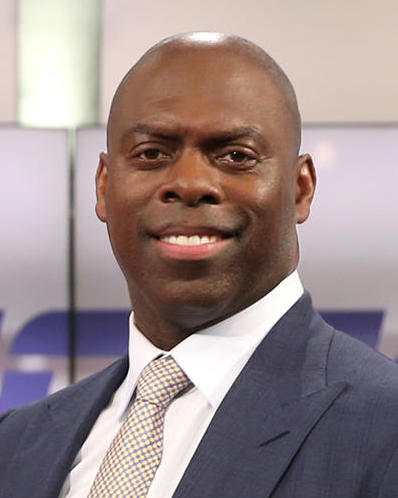
- Lynn in 2017

Washington Commanders
- Title: Running backs coach

Personal information
- Born: December 21, 1968 (age 57); McKinney, Texas, U.S.
- Listed height: 6 ft 3 in (1.91 m)
- Listed weight: 230 lb (104 kg)

Career information
- Position: Running back (No. 37, 29)
- High school: Celina (Celina, Texas)
- College: Texas Tech (1988–1991)
- NFL draft: 1992: undrafted

Career history

Playing
- New York Giants (1992)*; Denver Broncos (1993); San Francisco 49ers (1995–1996); Denver Broncos (1997–1999)
- * Offseason or practice squad member only

Coaching
- Denver Broncos (2000–2002) Special teams assistant; Jacksonville Jaguars (2003–2004) Running backs coach; Dallas Cowboys (2005–2006) Running backs coach; Cleveland Browns (2007–2008) Running backs coach; New York Jets (2009–2014); Running backs coach (2009–2012); Assistant head coach/running backs coach (2013–2014); Buffalo Bills (2015–2016); Assistant head coach/running backs coach (2015–2016); Interim head coach & offensive coordinator (2016); Los Angeles Chargers (2017–2020) Head coach; Detroit Lions (2021) Offensive coordinator; San Francisco 49ers (2022–2023) Assistant head coach/running backs coach; Washington Commanders (2024–present); Run game coordinator/running backs coach (2024–2025); Running backs coach (2026–present)

Awards and highlights
- 2× Super Bowl champion (XXXII, XXXIII); All-Southwest Conference (1990)

Career NFL statistics
- Rushing yards: 177
- Rushing average: 6.3
- Receptions: 3
- Receiving yards: 35
- Stats at Pro Football Reference

Head coaching record
- Regular season: 33–32 (.508)
- Postseason: 1–1 (.500)
- Career: 34–33 (.507)
- Coaching profile at Pro Football Reference

Anthony Ray Lynn (born December 21, 1968) is an American professional football coach and former running back who is the running backs coach for the Washington Commanders. He played running back for the Texas Tech Red Raiders and in the NFL for six seasons, primarily with the Denver Broncos where he won Super Bowl XXXII and XXXIII. Lynn entered coaching after retiring as a player in 2000, later serving as head coach of the Los Angeles Chargers from 2017 to 2020.

== Playing career ==
The 6 ft 3 in (1.91 m) Lynn played at Celina High School, and later for the Texas Tech Red Raiders (1988–1991), where he was an All-Southwest Conference running back in 1990. His senior year was cut short by a knee injury, and concerns about the injury left him undrafted. Lynn was a journeyman reserve running back and special teams player during his NFL career, playing for the Denver Broncos (1993, 1997–1999) and San Francisco 49ers (1995–1996). He retired in 2000 due to repeated neck stinger injuries. Lynn was part of Denver's back-to-back Super Bowl champion teams in 1997 and 1998.

== Coaching career ==
=== Denver Broncos ===
Upon retiring from playing football in 2000, Lynn joined the Denver Broncos coaching staff as an offensive assistant and assistant special teams coach, a role he held from 2000-2002.

=== Jacksonville Jaguars ===
Lynn then joined the Jacksonville Jaguars as the running backs coach (2003–2004). He left Jacksonville after being switched to special teams coach following a coaching staff shakeup by head coach Jack Del Rio in 2005.

=== Dallas Cowboys ===
After leaving Jacksonville, Lynn quickly joined the Dallas Cowboys staff as the running backs coach.

=== Cleveland Browns ===
On January 26, 2007, with the retirement of Bill Parcells as Dallas head coach, Lynn signed on with the Cleveland Browns to fill their running backs coach vacancy.

=== New York Jets ===
Lynn was named the assistant head coach/running backs coach for the New York Jets on February 1, 2012, under head coach Rex Ryan, and was subsequently interviewed for the head coach job in January 2015, after Ryan left. From 2009 to 2013, with Lynn as running backs coach, the Jets running game produced an NFL-leading 137.0 yards per game. In 2013, Lynn helped Chris Ivory establish a team-leading 833 yards on 182 carries.

=== Buffalo Bills ===
When Lynn did not get the position of head coach of the New York Jets, he followed Rex Ryan to the Buffalo Bills where he took the same position of running back coach. The Bills had the top rushing game in the NFL during the 2015–2016 season. On September 16, 2016, Lynn was promoted to assistant head coach and offensive coordinator of the Bills when Greg Roman was fired. When asked what he wants his offensive identity to be, Lynn responded, "I want to play smart, physical football. I want to be explosive down the field... We're going to play a little bit faster and see if we can put a little pressure on the defense. Just execute." Lynn made his debut as offensive coordinator against the Arizona Cardinals, pulling out a 33–18 win. Lynn was named interim head coach on December 27, 2016, after Rex Ryan was fired.

=== Head coach interest ===
On December 30, 2015, the Miami Dolphins interviewed Lynn for their head coach position. He was the fourth head coaching candidate interviewed that week. Lynn also interviewed for the head coaching job with the New York Jets on January 6, 2015, shortly after head coach Rex Ryan was fired. Lynn knew the organization well and was extremely well-respected.

In January 2016, Lynn was a head coaching candidate for the San Francisco 49ers, but removed his name from consideration before a decision was made. Despite not taking a head coaching position in 2016, media insider Ian Rapoport listed Lynn as one of his candidates in a good position to become a head coach. On January 12, 2017, Lynn was named head coach of the newly christened Los Angeles Chargers and one day later the Chargers officially confirmed his hiring as the new coach.

=== Los Angeles Chargers ===
On January 12, 2017, Lynn was hired to become the new head coach of the Los Angeles Chargers, the same day that owner Dean Spanos announced that the Chargers were relocating from San Diego to Los Angeles. Lynn's hire was confirmed by the Chargers one day later on January 13 on the team's website. Lynn became the franchise's first African-American head coach in its 56-year history.

In his second season as the Chargers head coach, Lynn led Los Angeles to a 12–4 record, earning its first playoff berth since 2013. The Chargers went on to defeat the Baltimore Ravens in the wild card round 23–17, before being eliminated in the divisional round by the eventual Super Bowl LIII champion New England Patriots by a score of 41–28.

Lynn would miss the playoffs in 2019, finishing last in the AFC West with a 5–11 record. During the subsequent offseason, the Chargers parted ways with Philip Rivers, who had been the team's starting quarterback since 2006. In the 2020 NFL draft, the Chargers drafted quarterback Justin Herbert of Oregon sixth overall, seen as an eventual replacement for Rivers.

In 2020, the Chargers missed the playoffs and finished third in the AFC West with a 7–9 record, winning their final four games of the season. On January 4, 2021, Lynn was fired by the Chargers. He finished his Chargers tenure with a 33–31 (.516) regular season record and 1–1 postseason record.

=== Detroit Lions ===
On January 23, 2021, Lynn was hired by the Detroit Lions as their offensive coordinator. On January 10, 2022, Lions head coach Dan Campbell announced the team and Lynn were parting ways.

=== San Francisco 49ers ===
On February 4, 2022, Lynn was hired by the San Francisco 49ers as their assistant head coach. Lynn gained the additional title of running backs coach when Bobby Turner stepped away to address health issues. Turner returned later to share running back coaching duties.

Following the 49ers' loss in the 2023 NFC Championship Game, the Washington Commanders were granted permission to interview Lynn for their vacancy at offensive coordinator in February 2023. The position ultimately went to Eric Bieniemy; however, the following season the Commanders and Bieniemy parted ways and Lynn was hired for the role of run game coordinator.

=== Washington Commanders ===
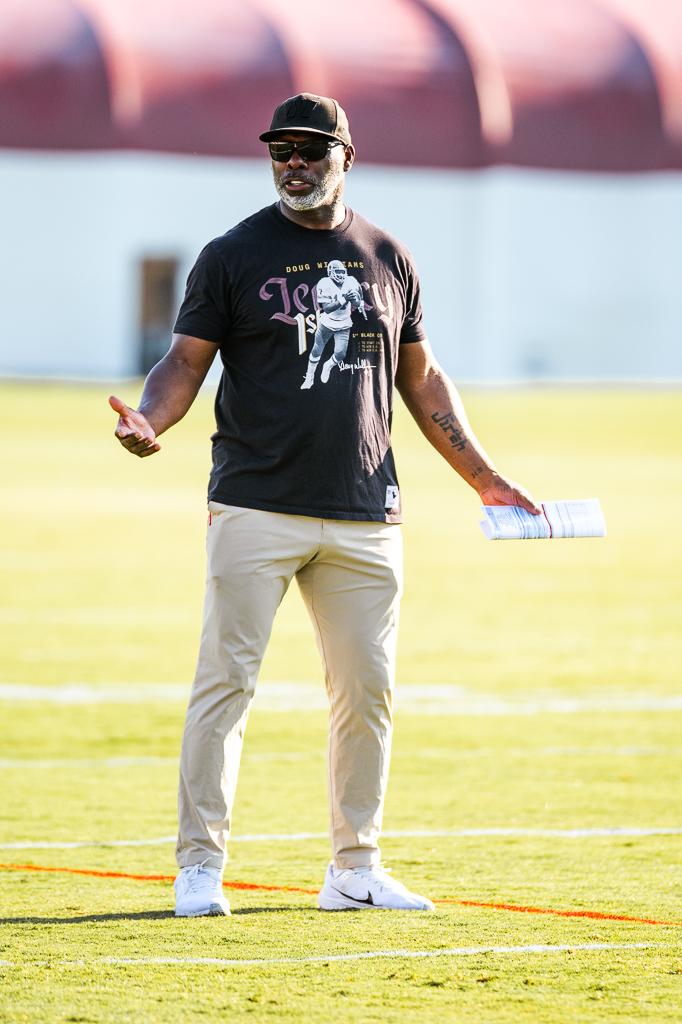
Lynn in 2025

On February 15, 2024, Lynn was hired by the Washington Commanders as their run game coordinator and running backs coach under new head coach Dan Quinn.

== Personal life ==
Lynn has two children, D'Anton and Danielle, with his ex-wife, Cynda. He married journalist Stacey Bell on March 5, 2011, in Dallas, Texas. D'Anton played college football for the Penn State Nittany Lions, and was signed as an undrafted rookie by the New York Jets following the 2012 NFL draft. D’Anton was soon released. Lynn was supportive of his son's decision to follow in his footsteps and taught him about the hard work that goes into being a professional football player both on and off the field.

During Cowboys training camp on August 20, 2005, Lynn was a victim of a hit-and-run automobile accident. Lynn and Todd Haley, both offensive assistants for Bill Parcells, were out for pizza after training camp in Ventura, California. As Lynn and Haley were crossing the street, Lynn was hit by drunk driver Sergio Sandoval. Lynn suffered two collapsed lungs, facial and shoulder damage, and temporary paralysis in his lower body. He had four surgeries on his face, knee and shoulder due to the incident. Lynn returned to coaching less than two weeks later. Lynn's story was featured in a Verizon advertisement during Super Bowl LIII in 2019, where he was introduced to the first responders who treated him.

On May 12, 2018, Lynn graduated from the University of Nevada, Las Vegas with a Bachelor of Arts in interdisciplinary studies.

== Head coaching record ==
Team	Year	Regular season					Postseason			
Team	Year	Won	Lost	Ties	Win %	Finish	Won	Lost	Win %	Result
BUF*	2016	0	1	0	.000	3rd in AFC East	—	—	—	—
BUF total		0	1	0	.000		0	0	.000	
LAC	2017	9	7	0	.563	2nd in AFC West	—	—	—	—
LAC	2018	12	4	0	.750	2nd in AFC West	1	1	.500	Lost to New England Patriots in AFC Divisional Game
LAC	2019	5	11	0	.313	4th in AFC West	—	—	—	—
LAC	2020	7	9	0	.438	3rd in AFC West	—	—	—	—
LAC total		33	31	0	.516		1	1	.500	
Total		33	32	0	.508		1	1	.500	

* – Interim head coach
