= Big Sandy High School (Big Sandy, Texas) =

Coordinates: 32.5879°N 95.1112°W

Location
- 401 Wildcat Dr. Big Sandy, Texas 75755-0598; United States

Information
- School type: Public high school
- School district: Big Sandy Independent School District
- Principal: Cindy Bauter
- Teaching staff: 21.15 (FTE)
- Grades: 9-12
- Enrollment: 188 (2023-2024)
- Student to teacher ratio: 8.89
- Colors: Blue & Gold
- Athletics conference: UIL Class AA
- Mascot: Wildcat
- Website: Big Sandy High School

Big Sandy High School is a public high school located in Big Sandy, Texas and classified as a 2A school by the UIL. It is part of the Big Sandy Independent School District in southwestern Upshur County, Texas In 2015, the school was rated "Met Standard" by the Texas Education Agency.

== Athletics ==
The Big Sandy Wildcats compete in Cross Country, Volleyball, Football, Basketball, Golf, Tennis, Track, Powerlifting, Softball, and Baseball.

=== State titles ===
- Football -
  - 1973(B), 1974(B)^, 1975(B)

Co-Champ with Celina

- Boys Track -
  - 1976(B)

The 1975 Big Sandy Wildcats football team is considered one of the most dominant in the history of Texas high school football. Going for their third consecutive Class B state title, Big Sandy went 14–0 with a (then) state record 11 shutouts, outscoring opponents 824–15. The offense scored a still national record 114 rushing touchdowns, of whom running back David Overstreet made 52 alone. The defense, led by defensive end/linebacker and future Chicago Bears coach Lovie Smith, allowed only two touchdowns all season. Only once during the entire season did Big Sandy trail during a game, when they were down 2–0 to Groom early in the championship game.

== Notable alumni ==
- David Overstreet, former Miami Dolphins player
- Lovie Smith, NFL head coach of the Chicago Bears, leading them to Super Bowl XLI; the Houston Texans; and college football head coach of the Illinois Fighting Illini.
