= Lovie Smith =

American football coach and former player (born 1958)

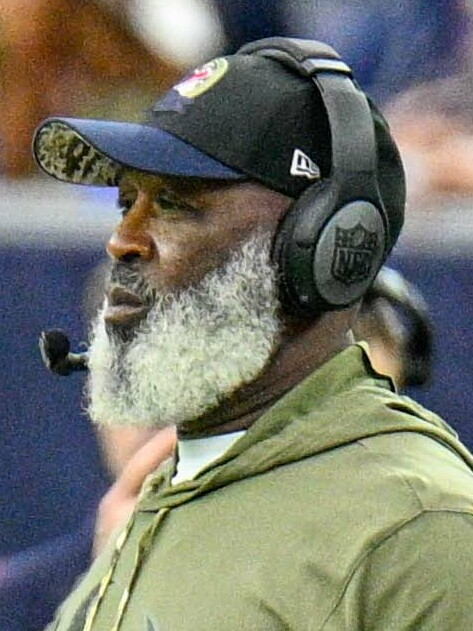
- Smith with the Houston Texans in 2022

Personal information
- Born: May 8, 1958 (age 68); Gladewater, Texas, U.S.

Career information
- High school: Big Sandy (TX)
- College: Tulsa

Career history
- Big Sandy HS (TX) (1980) Defensive coordinator; Cascia Hall Prep (OK) (1981–1982) Assistant defensive backs coach & wide receivers coach; Tulsa (1983–1986) Linebackers coach; Wisconsin (1987) Linebackers coach; Arizona State (1988–1991) Linebackers coach; Kentucky (1992) Linebackers coach; Tennessee (1993–1994) Defensive backs coach; Ohio State (1995) Defensive backs coach; Tampa Bay Buccaneers (1996–2000) Linebackers coach; St. Louis Rams (2001–2003) Defensive coordinator; Chicago Bears (2004–2012) Head coach; Tampa Bay Buccaneers (2014–2015) Head coach; Illinois (2016–2020) Head coach; Houston Texans (2021) Associate head coach & defensive coordinator; Houston Texans (2022) Head coach

Awards and highlights
- NFL Coach of the Year (2005); 2× Second-team All-American (1978, 1979)

Head coaching record
- Regular season: NFL: 92–100–1 (.479)
- Postseason: NFL: 3–3 (.500)
- Career: NFL: 95–103–1 (.480); NCAA: 17–39 (.304)
- Coaching profile at Pro Football Reference

Lovie Lee Smith (born May 8, 1958) is an American professional football coach. He has been the head coach of the Chicago Bears, Tampa Bay Buccaneers, and Houston Texans of the National Football League (NFL) and the Illinois Fighting Illini. Smith has been to the Super Bowl twice, as the defensive coordinator for the St. Louis Rams in 2001 and head coach for the Bears in 2006.

== Early life ==
Smith was raised in Big Sandy, Texas, and was named after his great-aunt, Lavana.

== Playing career ==
=== High school ===
During Smith's high school career at Big Sandy, he earned all-state honors for his three years as a defensive end and linebacker. His team won three consecutive state championships from 1973 to 1975, including a 0–0 tie in 1974 versus G. A. Moore's Celina. In 1975, Big Sandy had one of the most dominant seasons in high school football history, as the defense allowed only 15 points (11 shutouts) all season; Their offense, featuring eventual Miami Dolphins running back David Overstreet, scored a then-national record 824 points.

=== College ===
Smith played college football at the University of Tulsa under head coach John Cooper. He was a two-time All-American at linebacker and defensive back.

== Coaching career ==
=== High school ===
After graduating from college, he immediately pursued a coaching career. In 1980, Smith was hired as defensive coordinator at his alma mater, Big Sandy High School. A year later, he left for Cascia Hall Preparatory School in Tulsa, where he coached defensive backs and wide receivers from 1981 to 1982.

=== College assistant coach ===
Starting in 1983, Smith began coaching linebackers on the college level. He first served at his alma mater, the University of Tulsa (1983–1986), moving on to the University of Wisconsin–Madison (1987), Arizona State University (1988–1991), and last coached linebackers at the college level at the University of Kentucky (1992). He also served as defensive backs coach at the University of Tennessee (1993–1994) and Ohio State University (1995).

=== NFL assistant coach ===
Smith began his NFL coaching career as a linebacker coach for the Tampa Bay Buccaneers. Under the guidance of head coach Tony Dungy, he helped develop the Tampa 2 defense. After spending five years with the Buccaneers, Smith was hired as the defensive coordinator of the St. Louis Rams under head coach Mike Martz. While in St. Louis, Smith improved the Rams' defense, which went from giving up a league-worst 29.4 points per game in 2000, to an average of 17.1 points per game in 2001. The Rams won the NFC Championship Game and advanced to Super Bowl XXXVI. The team ultimately lost to the New England Patriots in one of the biggest Super Bowl upsets of all time.

=== Chicago Bears ===
==== 2004–2006 ====
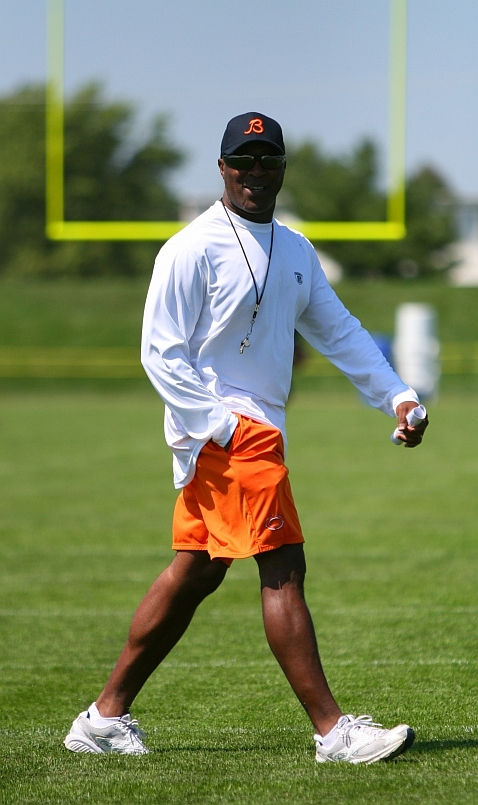
Lovie Smith at the Chicago Bears 2007 training camp

The Chicago Bears hired Smith as head coach in 2004, following the dismissal of Dick Jauron. Upon arriving in Chicago, Smith stated he had three goals: beat the Green Bay Packers, win the NFC North, and win a Super Bowl. His first season with the Bears was a struggle, from implementing new offensive and defensive systems, to a series of injuries, including a season-ending knee injury to starting quarterback Rex Grossman. The team finished with a 5–11 record. Despite their poor offense, the Bears' defense saw significant improvement, rising from 22nd in 2003 to 13th in 2004.

In 2005, history repeated itself when Grossman suffered a serious injury during the preseason and missed a majority of the season. In the absence of Grossman, Smith and defensive coordinator Ron Rivera structured a dominant defense and the timely play of backup quarterback Kyle Orton to earn an 11–5 record, after starting the season with a 1–3 record. The Bears' defense finished second in the league in terms of yardage, while allowing the fewest points in the league.

The Bears' dramatic turnaround in the 2005 season earned Smith national recognition, which included earning the Associated Press NFL Coach of the Year Award. After returning to the field following their first round bye, the Bears played the Carolina Panthers, with a fully-healed Grossman at quarterback. Both the Bears' offense and defense struggled to keep up with the Panthers, and they eventually lost 29–21.

Smith and the Bears' management drew criticism in April 2006 by trading away their first-round pick, as well as drafting five defensive players. The preseason criticism increased when he announced Grossman, who struggled to move the Bears' offense during the preseason, would remain the starting quarterback. Grossman led the Bears to seven consecutive victories, but struggled during the later portion of the season. Despite his performance, Smith stood by Grossman, stating "Rex is our quarterback" when questioned by the media. The Bears finished the 2006 season with a 13–3 record, earning the NFC's top playoff seed. The Bears finished the season with the NFL's second-ranked scoring offense, and fifth-ranked overall defense.

Smith led the Bears to a 27–24 victory in overtime against the defending NFC champion, the Seattle Seahawks, during the 2006 Divisional Playoffs, securing the first playoff win of his career. The Bears went on to a 39–14 victory against the New Orleans Saints in the NFC Championship Game. Smith became the first Black head coach (and the second minority coach, behind Tom Flores) to lead his team to a Super Bowl. Hours later, the Indianapolis Colts' head coach, Tony Dungy, Smith's good friend and mentor, became the second. The colleagues became the first two African American head coaches to oppose each other in a Super Bowl. The Bears went on to lose Super Bowl XLI 29–17.

==== 2007–2012 ====
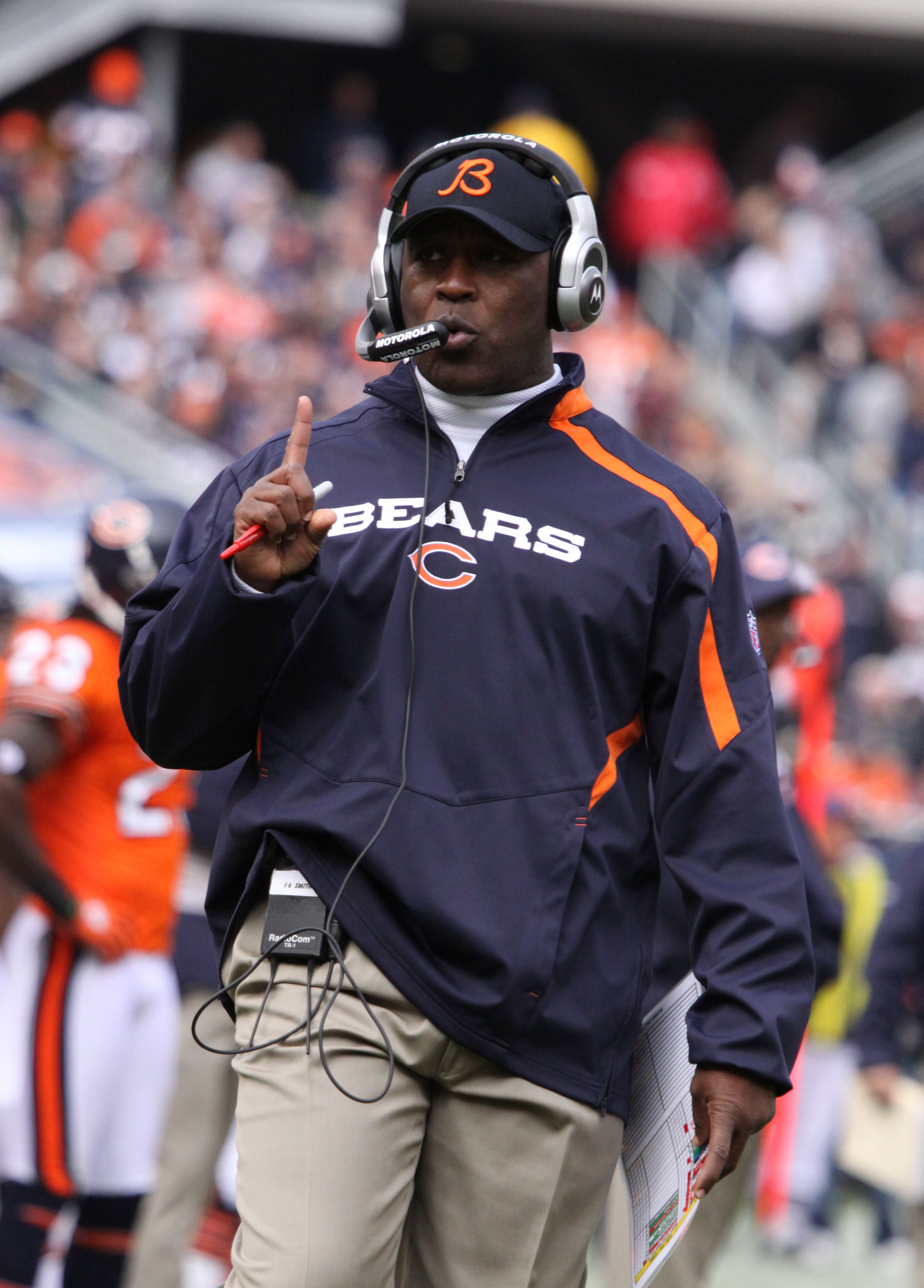
Smith with the Chicago Bears in 2009

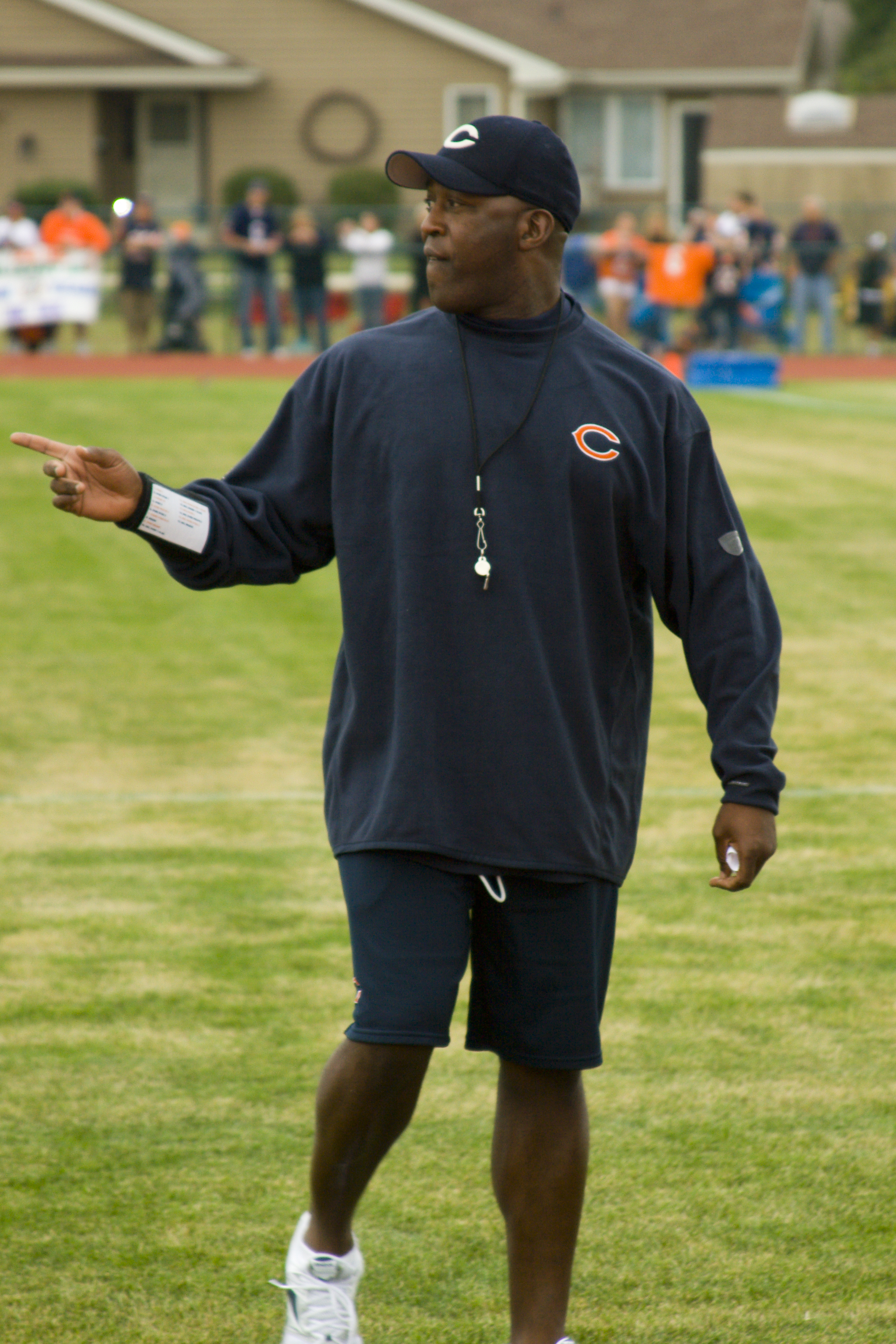
Smith at training camp, 2009

Following Chicago's successful season, Smith requested a pay raise. At $1.35 million, he was the lowest-paid coach in the NFL in 2006. Smith would have earned $1.45 million in the final season of his four-year contract. After a stalemate in contract negotiations, the Bears signed Smith to a new four-year contract worth $22 million on March 1. However, he parted ways with defensive coordinator Ron Rivera, who was not re-signed after his contract expired. Additionally, four other members of Smith's coaching staff left the team as well.

In 2007, Smith, confident in Rex Grossman's abilities, named him the team's starting quarterback over Kyle Orton and Brian Griese. After the team started the season with a 1–2 record, Smith announced that Griese would replace Grossman. Griese led the Bears to a 2–3 record, but sustained an injury against the Oakland Raiders, which allowed Grossman to become the team's starting quarterback again. However, Grossman was later injured in the season, and was temporarily relieved by Griese. Smith ultimately allowed Orton to finish the remainder of the season, who led the Bears to a 2–1 record. The team's inconsistency at the quarterback position, and failure to establish a proper running game, contributed to the team's 7–9 finish. While the team finished last in the NFC North, Smith was pleased that the team ended the season by winning their last two games. Bob Babich, Rivera's replacement as the team's defensive coordinator, was also criticized for his play calling.

The next year, Smith and the Bears parted ways with their leading rusher Cedric Benson, as well as passer Griese, and receiver Bernard Berrian. Smith declared Orton as the team's starting quarterback, who started the season with an upset victory over the Indianapolis Colts. The Bears went 2–2, with two overtime losses. Despite the team avoiding to fall below .500 for the remainder of the season, they missed the playoffs after losing their season finale to the Houston Texans. Smith was pleased with the success of Orton, who finished the season with a 79.6 quarterback rating, as well as rookie running back Matt Forte. After the season's conclusion, Smith demoted Babich and took over defensive play-calling responsibilities. He was also reunited with long-time friend, Rod Marinelli, who had lost his head coaching job with the Detroit Lions.

In the 2009 offseason, Smith and the Bears' general manager Jerry Angelo had conflicting views on the future of the team's quarterback position. While Smith was content with Orton, Angelo was more interested in creating a long-term solution to the position. Angelo ultimately traded Orton and three draft picks (the Bears' 2009 and 2010 first-round draft picks, as well as their 2009 third-round pick) to the Denver Broncos for Jay Cutler. The team's high expectations were quickly grounded when the Bears struggled in November, losing four of five games. The Bears were eliminated from the playoff race for the third consecutive year, after losing to the Green Bay Packers during a Week 14 matchup. The loss marked the first time that the Bears, under Lovie Smith, had ever lost two games to Green Bay in a single season.

A week after the loss to Green Bay, it was reported that, despite rumors about changes to the Bears coaching staff, Smith would remain the team's head coach. Angelo refused to confirm these reports when addressing the media the following Sunday. Smith finished out the season with consecutive wins against the Minnesota Vikings and the Detroit Lions. His victory over Detroit marked his 100th game as the team's head coach.

After the 2009 season's conclusion, the Bears' organization announced that Smith would return. However, they fired offensive coordinator Ron Turner and three other offensive coaches. Smith was reunited with Turner's replacement, Mike Martz, who had been the head coach of the St. Louis Rams when Smith was their defensive coordinator. Smith was relieved of his defensive play-calling responsibilities, while Babich was officially demoted as the team's defensive coordinator. Marinelli was promoted to the position.

In 2010, the Bears finished 11–5 on the season and first in the NFC North, but lost to the Green Bay Packers in the NFC Championship Game.

In 2011, the Bears went 7–3, but after losing Cutler to a broken thumb, the Bears lost five straight games, a first in Smith's career, finishing 8–8. At the end of the season, Angelo was fired, and Martz resigned. Phil Emery, who worked under Smith during the 2004 season as an area scout for the Bears, became the new general manager. Bears' offensive line coach Mike Tice replaced Martz at offensive coordinator.

The Bears started the 2012 season on a promising note with a 7–1 record. The team's defense ranked first in takeaways, third in points allowed, and fifth in yards allowed. However, the team lost five of their next eight games. In Week 13 of the 2012 season, the Bears recorded their 300th takeaway under Smith.

The Bears finished the season with a 10–6 record, but missed the playoffs for the fifth time in six years. On December 31, 2012, Smith was fired as head coach of the Chicago Bears. Smith departed the Bears with nine years of service, three playoff appearances, one Coach of the Year award, and one Super Bowl appearance.

Prior to sitting out the 2013 season, Smith interviewed with the Philadelphia Eagles and the Buffalo Bills, regarding their head coaching vacancies.

=== Tampa Bay Buccaneers ===
On January 7, 2014, Smith returned to the Tampa Bay Buccaneers' as the 10th head coach in their franchise history. Regarding his first stint with the Buccaneers, Smith said, "We did lay a foundation for Tampa Bay Buccaneer football, there's a certain brand of football that you expected from us. That would be relentless, you play hard, physical, but there was a brand of football that you did get from us each week at Raymond James Stadium. It was hard for opponents to come in and win." Smith also interviewed for the head coaching vacancies held by the Houston Texans and the Detroit Lions, prior to securing the role with the Buccaneers.

On January 6, 2016, Smith was fired after posting a record of 8–24 in his two years, including a 6–10 record in the 2015 season.

=== University of Illinois ===
On March 7, 2016, Smith returned to college football and was named head coach for the University of Illinois, agreeing to a contract paying $21 million over six years. In the 48 hours following the announcement of the Smith hire, the university sold over 2,000 new season tickets and more than 400 new student season tickets.

When Smith's contract was approved by the university's board of trustees at their September 2016 meeting, $2 million of the salary was moved from the last two years of the contract and made payable in earlier years. Additionally, the contract provided for up to $8 million in performance bonuses.

On October 19, 2019, the Fighting Illini had their most significant win since Smith took over as head coach with a 24–23 upset over then #6 Wisconsin. That season, Smith led the Fighting Illini to a 6–6 regular season record and they played their first bowl game since 2014. Smith was fired on December 13, 2020, after Illinois started the season with a 2–5 record. He finished with an overall record of 17–39 in five seasons at Illinois, including a 10–33 record in Big Ten Conference play.

=== Houston Texans ===
Smith was hired on March 10, 2021, by the Houston Texans as their associate head coach and defensive coordinator under head coach David Culley, marking Smith's first time in the NFL since 2015, when he served as head coach of the Tampa Bay Buccaneers. In Smith's first season leading the Texans' defense in 2021, Houston recorded 25 total takeaways, which tied for 10th in the NFL, while intercepting 3.1% of opponent passing attempts, the fifth-highest rate in the league.

He was promoted to head coach on February 7, 2022. Smith had previously interviewed for the Texans' head coaching job in December 2013, where they decided to hire Penn State head coach and former New England Patriots assistant Bill O'Brien on January 3, 2014.

Smith was fired on January 8, 2023, after the Texans went 3–13–1 in the 2022 season. The firing occurred hours after the Texans won their season finale against the Indianapolis Colts, which cost them the first overall pick in the 2023 NFL draft. Instead, the pick went to his former team, the Chicago Bears.

== Personal life ==
Smith and his wife, MaryAnne, have three sons.

Smith, whose late mother was blind because of diabetes, is an active supporter of the American Diabetes Association. He and his wife are also the founders of the Lovie and MaryAnne Smith Foundation, a program which provides educational and life skill opportunities to worthy young people who otherwise face barriers in reaching their educational goals. He was the grand marshal for the USG Sheetrock 400 NASCAR Nextel Cup Series race at Chicagoland Speedway on July 15, 2007.

Smith is a devout Christian and has contributed every month to Brown's Chapel, his former Methodist church in Texas. In 2012, Smith was inducted into the Texas Sports Hall of Fame, along with Bubba Smith, Dave Parks, Andre Ware, Mack Brown and Fred Couples.

== Head coaching record ==
=== NFL ===
Team	Year	Regular season					Postseason			
Team	Year	Won	Lost	Ties	Win %	Finish	Won	Lost	Win %	Result
CHI	2004	5	11	0	.313	4th in NFC North	—	—	—	—
CHI	2005	11	5	0	.688	1st in NFC North	0	1	.000	Lost to Carolina Panthers in NFC Divisional Game
CHI	2006	13	3	0	.813	1st in NFC North	2	1	.667	Lost to Indianapolis Colts in Super Bowl XLI
CHI	2007	7	9	0	.438	4th in NFC North	—	—	—	—
CHI	2008	9	7	0	.563	2nd in NFC North	—	—	—	—
CHI	2009	7	9	0	.438	3rd in NFC North	—	—	—	—
CHI	2010	11	5	0	.688	1st in NFC North	1	1	.500	Lost to Green Bay Packers in NFC Championship Game
CHI	2011	8	8	0	.500	3rd in NFC North	—	—	—	—
CHI	2012	10	6	0	.625	3rd in NFC North	—	—	—	—
CHI Total		81	63	0	.563		3	3	.500	
TB	2014	2	14	0	.125	4th in NFC South	—	—	—	—
TB	2015	6	10	0	.375	4th in NFC South	—	—	—	—
TB Total		8	24	0	.250		0	0	.000	
HOU	2022	3	13	1	.206	4th in AFC South	—	—	—	—
HOU Total		3	13	1	.206		—	—	—	
Total		92	100	1	.479		3	3	.500	

=== College ===
Year	Team	Overall	Conference	Standing	Bowl/playoffs
Illinois Fighting Illini (Big Ten Conference) (2016–2020)
2016	Illinois	3–9	2–7	6th (West)	
2017	Illinois	2–10	0–9	7th (West)	
2018	Illinois	4–8	2–7	7th (West)	
2019	Illinois	6–7	4–5	4th (West)	L Redbox
2020	Illinois	2–5*	2–5*	7th (West)	
Illinois:		17–39	10–33	*Fired after seven games	
Total:		17–39			
