= Big Sandy, Texas =

- Town
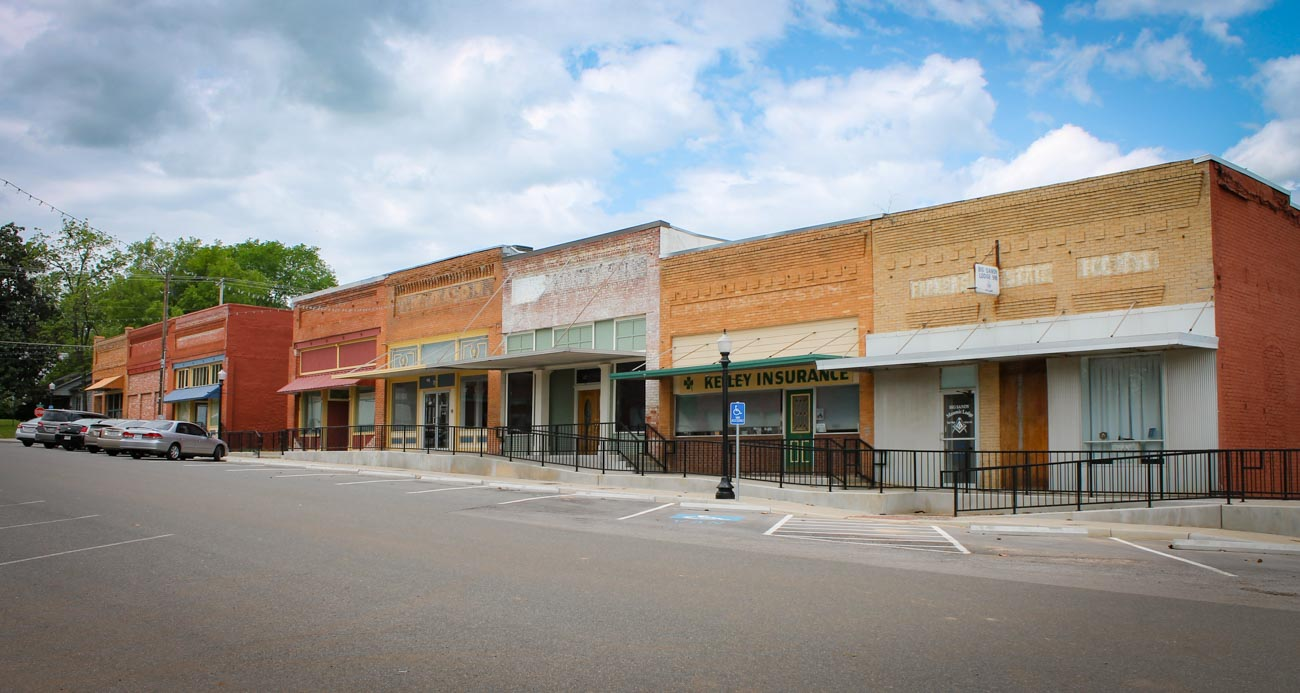
- Downtown Big Sandy

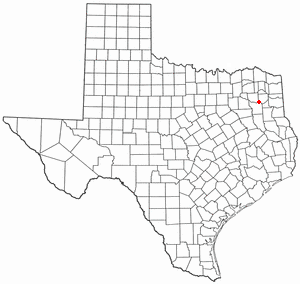
- Location of Big Sandy, Texas

- Coordinates: 32°35′09″N 95°07′18″W
- Country: United States
- State: Texas
- County: Upshur

Area
  - Total: 1.66 sq mi (4.31 km^{2})
  - Land: 1.63 sq mi (4.21 km^{2})
  - Water: 0.039 sq mi (0.10 km^{2})
- Elevation: 433 ft (132 m)

Population (2020)
  - Total: 1,231
  - Density: 869.3/sq mi (335.63/km^{2})
- Time zone: UTC-6 (Central (CST))
  - Summer (DST): UTC-5 (CDT)
- ZIP code: 75755, 75797
- Area codes: 903, 430
- FIPS code: 48-08224
- GNIS feature ID: 2411688
- Website: bigsandytx.gov

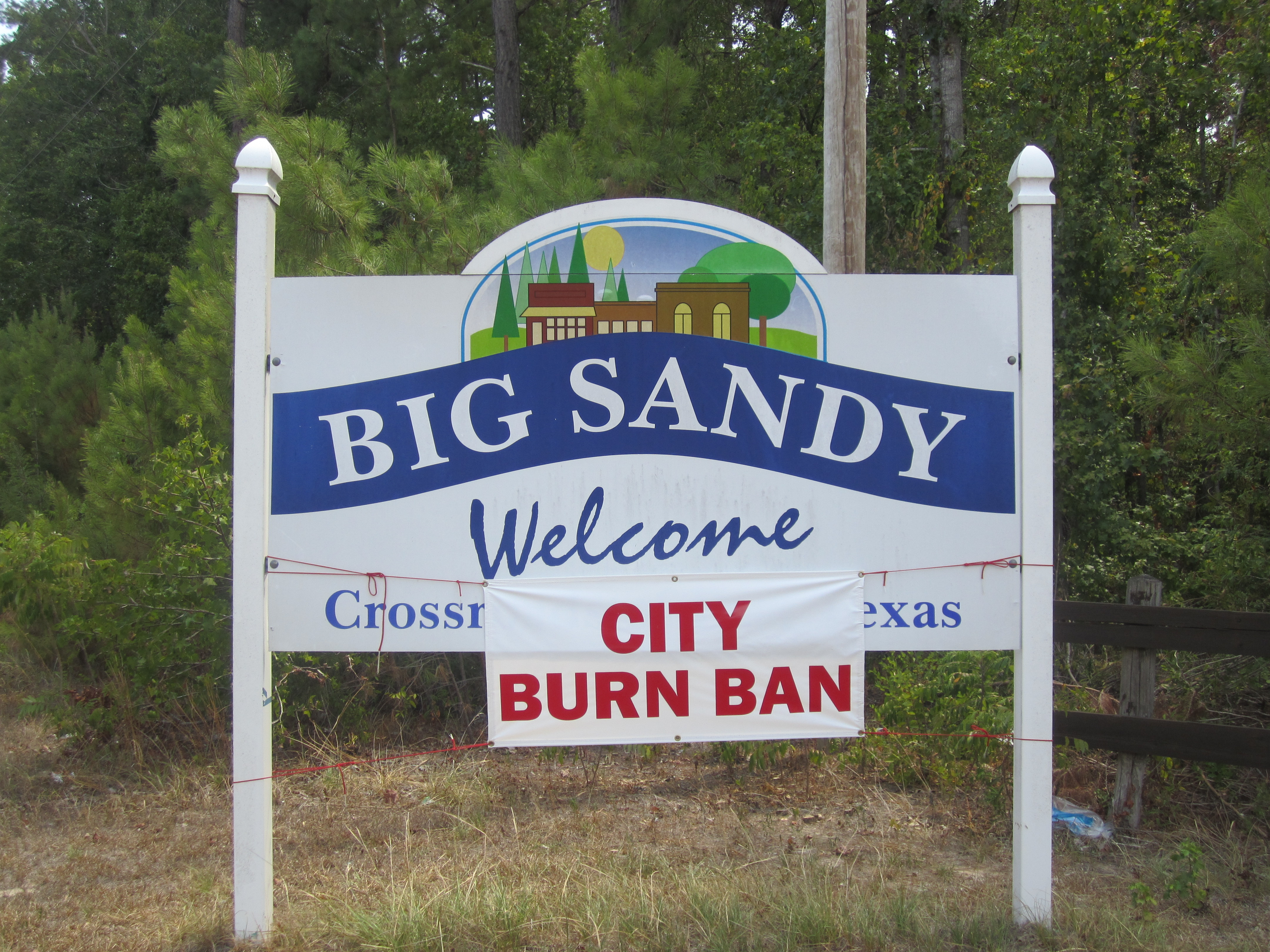
A burn ban was declared in Big Sandy in the summer of 2011.

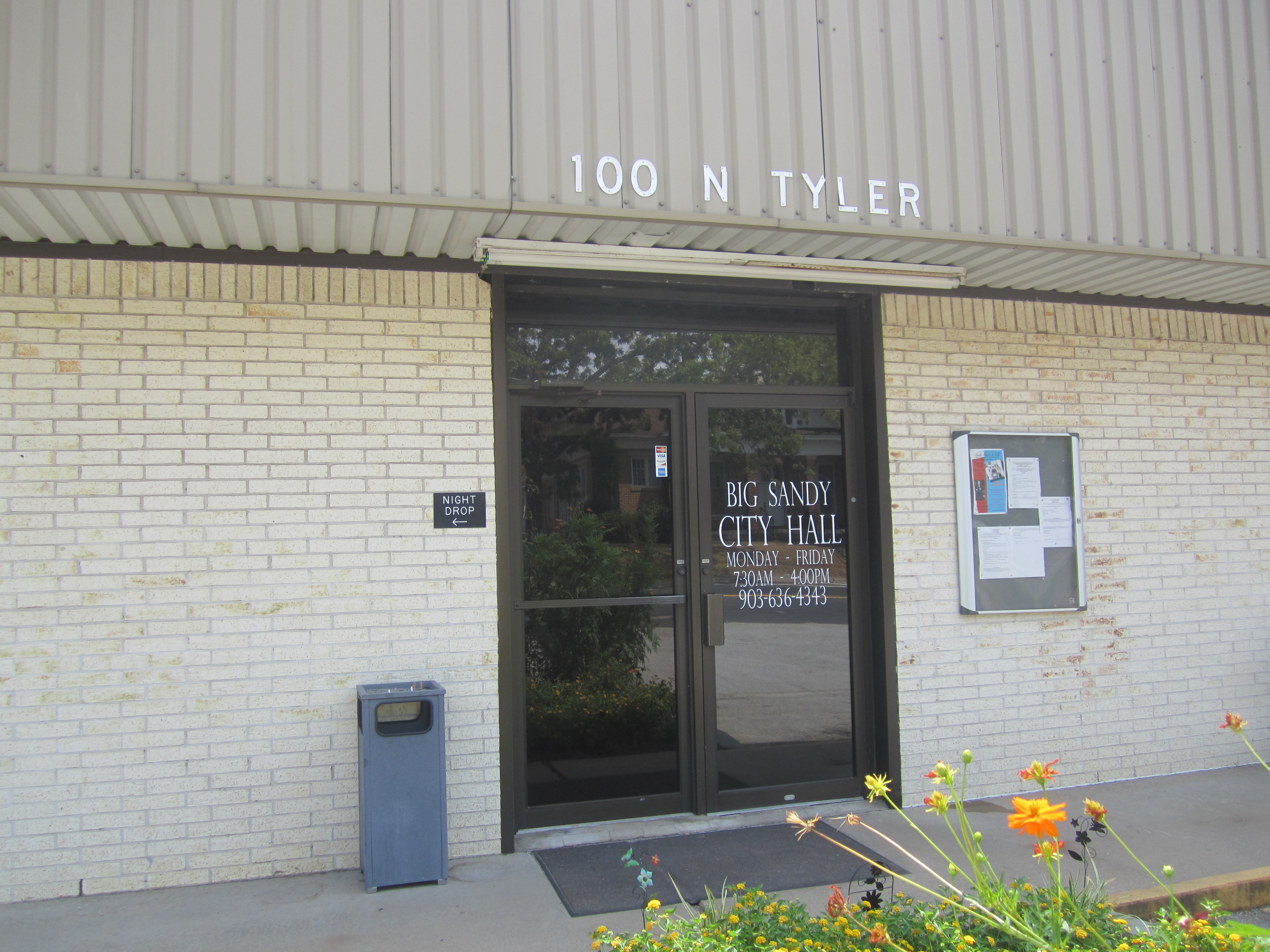
Big Sandy City Hall

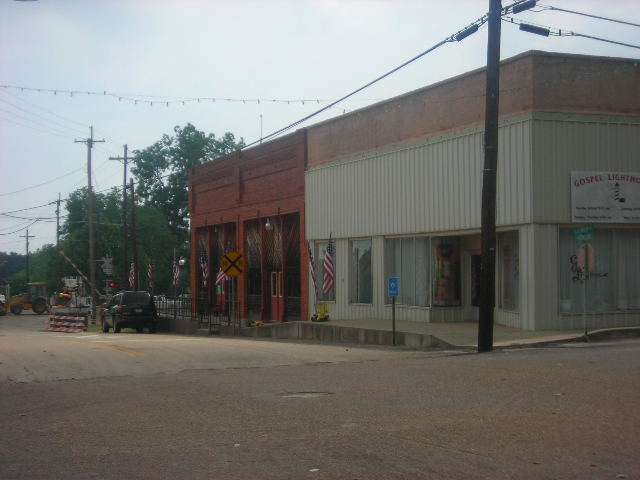
A glimpse of downtown Big Sandy

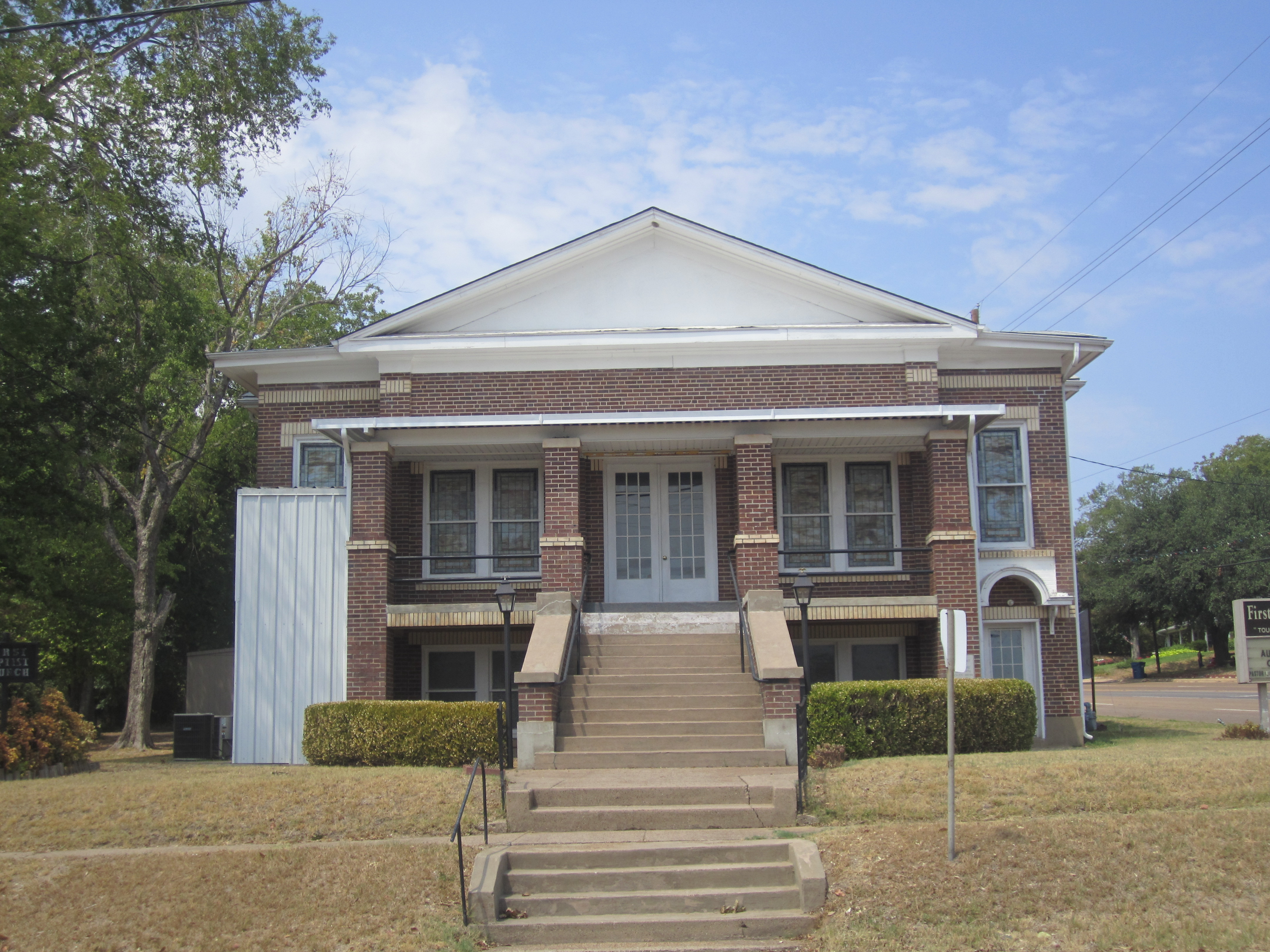
Big Sandy Music Hall, originally the First Baptist Church, which has since relocated to a new facility north of town.

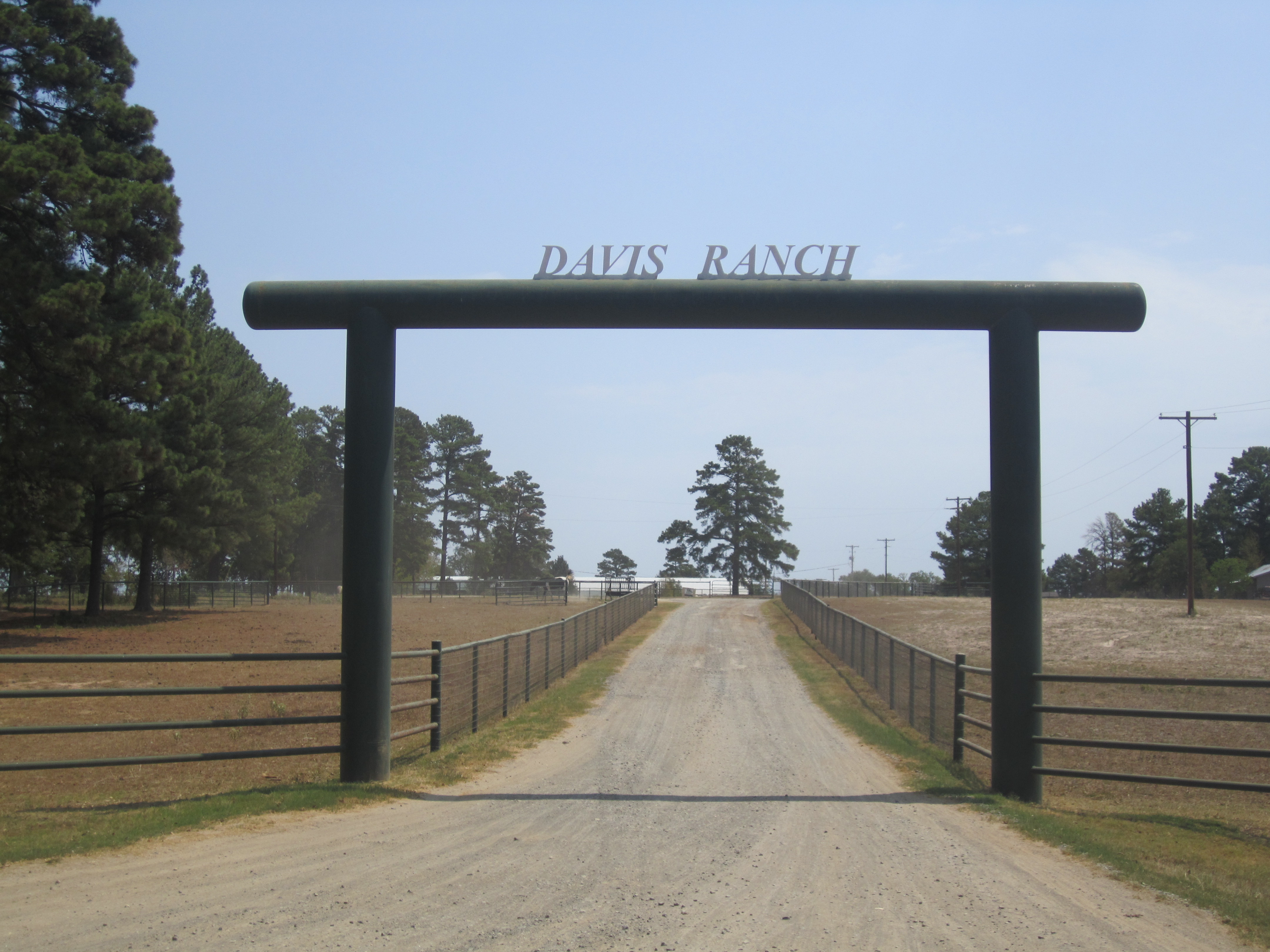
Entrance to Davis Ranch in Big Sandy, Texas; the Davis Ranch Arena hosts annual rodeo events, including a barrel race in October.

Big Sandy is a town in Upshur County, Texas, United States. As of the 2020 census, the town's population was 1,231. A lake of the same name is cut nearly in half by U.S. Highway 80, the main thoroughfare of Big Sandy. It lies directly west of the larger cities of Gladewater and Longview.

The Sabine River flows just south of Big Sandy. In the 19th century, Walters' Bluff Ferry operated on the Sabine, with passage across costing 40 cents per person and up to 75 cents for wagons.

== Geography ==
According to the United States Census Bureau, the town has a total area of 1.7 square miles (4.3 km^{2}), of which 0.04 square miles (0.1 km^{2}) of it (1.80%) is covered by water.

== Demographics ==
Historical population
Census	Pop.	Note	%±
1890	323		—
1920	658		—
1930	579		−12.0%
1940	609		5.2%
1950	689		13.1%
1960	848		23.1%
1970	1,022		20.5%
1980	1,258		23.1%
1990	1,185		−5.8%
2000	1,288		8.7%
2010	1,343		4.3%
2020	1,231		−8.3%
U.S. Decennial Census

Big Sandy racial composition as of 2020 (NH = Non-Hispanic) (Note: Note: the US Census treats Hispanic/Latino as an ethnic category. This table excludes Latinos from the racial categories and assigns them to a separate category. Hispanics/Latinos can be of any race.)
Race	Number	Percentage
White (NH)	916	74.41%
Black or African American (NH)	169	13.73%
Native American or Alaska Native (NH)	8	0.65%
Asian (NH)	2	0.16%
Pacific Islander (NH)	1	0.08%
Some other race (NH)	2	0.16%
Multiracial (NH)	63	5.12%
Hispanic or Latino	70	5.69%
Total	1,231	

As of the 2020 United States census, 1,231 people, 524 households, and 300 families resided in the town.

As of the census of 2000, 1,288 people, 532 households, and 342 families were residing in the town. The population density was 786.8 inhabitants per square mile (303.8/km^{2}). The 595 housing units had an average density of 363.4 per square mile (140.3/km^{2}). The racial makeup of the town was 81.75% White, 12.89% African American, 0.39% Native American, 1.16% Asian, 2.95% from other races, and 0.85% from two or more races. Hispanics or Latinos of any race were 3.49% of the population.

Of the 532 households, 32.7% had children under 18 living with them, 47.4% were married couples living together, 13.2% had a female householder with no husband present, and 35.7% were not families. About 34.4% of all households were made up of individuals, and 17.9% had someone living alone who was 65 or older. The average household size was 2.42 and the average family size was 3.11.

In the town, the age distribution was 28.0% under 18, 8.7% from 18 to 24, 26.6% from 25 to 44, 19.3% from 45 to 64, and 17.5% who were 65 or older. The median age was 36 years. For every 100 females, there were 86.9 males. For every 100 females 18 and over, there were 78.5 males.

The median income for a household in the town was $25,284 and for a family was $34,107. Males had a median income of $26,083 versus $21,071 for females. The per capita income for the town was $14,989. About 16.4% of families and 17.8% of the population were below the poverty line, including 24.9% of those under 18 and 15.6% of those 65 or over.

== History ==
Big Sandy is about 14 miles (23 km) southwest of Gilmer, Texas, at the intersection of U.S. Highway 80 and Texas State Highway 155 in Upshur County. It was established shortly after the American Civil War. The settlement was first known as Big Sandy Switch because a stretch of the Texas and Pacific Railroad was built through the area and eventually intersected with a narrow-gauge railroad called the Tyler Tap (both lines are now part of today's Union Pacific). A post office was followed by a newspaper, stores, and churches. In 1926, the settlement was incorporated as Big Sandy, with a population of about 850.

=== Worldwide Church of God ===
During the 1950s, Big Sandy became linked to a religious movement that would greatly influence the community for four decades. Local resident Buck Hammer was a member of the Radio Church of God (which later became known as the Worldwide Church of God), a California-based, Sabbatarian movement headed by radio evangelist Herbert W. Armstrong. Hammer donated a small parcel of land (less than 10 acres) to the church, which built a meeting hall and began holding annual church conventions there by the middle 1950s.

The church in subsequent years bought hundreds more acres adjacent to the original site. Thousands of church members converged on Big Sandy and surrounding communities for the week-long Feast of Tabernacles each year, creating a significant economic impact. In the mid-1960s, Armstrong developed more of the property and established a second campus of Ambassador College, the original campus of which continued to operate at the church's headquarters facility in Pasadena, California. The presence of the college, along with the annual convention operation, influenced hundreds of church members to relocate to Big Sandy and the surrounding area over the years. Although Ambassador ceased operations in 1997 (roughly a decade after Armstrong's death and after his successor repudiated much of Armstrong's original teachings), many families once affiliated with it and the church chose to remain in the Big Sandy area.

In March 2000, the campus was sold to the Green Family Trust (owner of Hobby Lobby Stores, Inc.), which leased it to the Institute in Basic Life Principles (IBLP). It was then developed as the International ALERT Academy, the home of the Air Land Emergency Resource Team (ALERT), a Christian program training young men in disaster relief and emergency services. The academy also serves as a camp and conference center and holds four-week summer programs for boys and girls. It now serves as the official headquarters of IBLP after it relocated from the Chicago area, where it was founded (this took place after Bill Gothard, IBLP's founder and president, resigned amidst controversy over allegations of sexual misconduct).

=== Needlecraft businesses ===
In the late 1970s, local residents Jerry Gentry and Annie Potter began a mail-order business from their home in Big Sandy and called it Annie's Attic. The business grew rapidly into a multimillion-dollar enterprise, publishing magazines and catalogs for needlecraft enthusiasts. After the couple divorced in the early 1980s, Annie continued to preside over Annie's Attic, while Jerry launched a near-replicate business called the Needlecraft Shop, also in Big Sandy. By the 1990s, both businesses had been purchased in separate transactions by Dynamic Resource Group (DRG), a publishing company in Berne, Indiana. DRG management moved both companies' operations to Indiana. Before doing so, it established a new company, Strategic Fulfillment Group (SFG), on the southwest edge of Big Sandy. SFG, which handles mailing and subscription fulfillment for DRG and other clients, is now Big Sandy and Upshur County's largest employer.

=== "Texas' Largest Manhunt" ===
On July 10–11, 1986, more than 1,000 law enforcement officers responded to Big Sandy Chief of Police Richard Lingle's request for assistance after convicted murderer Jerry "The Animal" McFadden escaped from the Upshur County jail. He took jailer Rosalie Williams, the wife of a Department of Public Safety trooper, as hostage. Lingle broadcast his call for help after Upshur County authorities were unable to track down McFadden and his hostage that evening. Responding officers securely cordoned off the city, leaving McFadden little chance of escape, and he was recaptured and returned to jail. Due to severe overcrowding in prisons, he had been paroled, despite a past marked by violence, and committed additional crimes. McFadden was executed in October 1999 for the murder of Suzanne Denise Harrison, a teen from nearby Hawkins.

=== Sports ===
The Big Sandy High School football team won three Texas Class B state championships in consecutive years 1973–1975. Although the state finals game in 1974 ended in a 0–0 tie (vs Celina), UIL granted both teams co-championships. In 2005, the Wildcats again reached the state 1-A finals, falling 21–20 to Stratford.

== Notable people ==
- Lovie Smith, former head coach of the Houston Texans, Illinois Fighting Illini, the Tampa Bay Buccaneers, and the Chicago Bears
- Henry Thomas, blues musician
- David Overstreet, former member of the Miami Dolphins

== Education ==
The Town of Big Sandy is served by the Big Sandy Independent School District.
