= Celina High School (Texas) =

Public school in Texas, United States

Location
- 3455 North Preston Road; Celina, Texas 75009; United States; 33.323659°N 96.777901°W

Information
- Type: Co-Educational, Public, Secondary
- School district: Celina Independent School District
- Principal: John Burdett
- Teaching staff: 76.71 (FTE)
- Grades: 9-12
- Enrollment: 1,176 (2023-2024)
- Student to teacher ratio: 15.33
- Colors: Orange & White
- Athletics conference: UIL Class 5A
- Mascot: Bobcat Bennie
- Nickname: Bobcats
- Website: Celina High School

Celina High School is a public high school located in Celina, Texas, United States. It is part of the Celina Independent School District located in northwestern Collin County and classified as a 5A school by the UIL. In 2022, the school received an overall accountability rating of 'A' from the Texas Education Agency.

== Athletics ==
The Celina Bobcats compete in the following sports:

- Baseball
- Basketball
- Cheerleading
- Cross Country
- Football
- Golf
- Marching Band
- Powerlifting
- Soccer
- Softball
- Swimming and Diving
- Tennis
- Track and Field
- Volleyball
- Wrestling

=== State titles ===
The Celina Bobcats have won 36 Texas UIL state titles.

- Football (9)
  - 1974(B) (Co-Champ), 1995(2A), 1998(2A/D2), 1999(2A/D2), 2000(2A/D2), 2001(2A/D2), 2005(2A/D2), 2007(3A/D2), 2024(4A/D1)
  - Longest all-time consecutive winning streak in Texas High School 11-man Football history at 68 games from 1998-2002
- Girls Cross Country (4)
  - 2000(2A), 2002(3A), 2021(4A), 2022(4A)
- Girls Soccer (5)
  - 2022(4A), 2023(4A), 2024(4A) 2025(4A/D1), 2026(4A/D1)
- Baseball (1)
  - 2002(2A),
- Boys Track (5)
  - 1969(B), 1970(B), 1991(2A), 2012(3A), 2013(3A)
- Girls Track (3)
  - 1994(2A), 1995(2A), 2003(3A)
- Softball (1)
  - 2011(3A)
- Cheerleading (2)
  - 2022(4A D2), 2024(4A D2)
- Marching Band (4)
  - 2022(4A), 2023(4A), 2024(4A) 2025(4A)

== Notable alumni ==
- Jamie Blatnick (class of 2007), former NFL player
- Anthony Lynn (class of 1987), former NFL player and current coach for the Washington Commanders
- D'Anton Lynn (class of 2008), former NFL player and current defensive coordinator coach for the USC Trojans
- Ryan Merritt (class of 2010), former MLB pitcher
- Jordan Roos (class of 2012), current NFL free agent offensive guard

== Notable staff ==
- G.A. Moore, head coach who held the record for most wins in Texas high school football history from 2011 to 2016.
