= David Overstreet =

American gridiron football player (1958–1984)

No. 20
- Position: Running back

Personal information
- Born: September 20, 1958; Big Sandy, Texas, U.S.
- Died: June 24, 1984 (aged 25); Winona, Texas, U.S.
- Listed height: 5 ft 11 in (1.80 m)
- Listed weight: 208 lb (94 kg)

Career information
- High school: Big Sandy
- College: Oklahoma
- NFL draft: 1981: 1st round, 13th overall pick

Career history
- Montreal Alouettes / Concordes (1981–1982); Miami Dolphins (1983)

Awards and highlights
- Second-team All-Big Eight (1980)

Career NFL statistics
- Carries: 85
- Rushing yards: 392
- Rushing touchdowns: 1
- Stats at Pro Football Reference

David Arthur Overstreet (September 20, 1958 – June 24, 1984) was an American professional football player who was a running back in the Canadian Football League (CFL) and National Football League (NFL). He played college football for coach Barry Switzer and the Oklahoma Sooners as a halfback out of the wishbone offense.

== Biography ==
A native of Big Sandy, Texas, David Overstreet prepped at Big Sandy High School and played his college football at the University of Oklahoma.

One of Overstreet's great moments as a Sooner happened on October 4, 1980 when the senior halfback ran for 258 yards on 18 carries against the Colorado Buffaloes as Oklahoma won big, 82-42. He had long runs of 84 and 53 yards in the contest.

For Overstreet's senior season, the 5-11, 180-pound running back led the University of Oklahoma to a 10-2 record, a No. 3 ranking nationally, and the Big Eight Conference Championship while rushing for a team-leading 678 yards on 96 carries with six touchdowns.

He was drafted in the 1981 NFL draft by the Miami Dolphins in the first round, 13th pick overall. A contract dispute with the Dolphins led him to sign with the Montreal Alouettes of the Canadian Football League, who, under the ownership of Nelson Skalbania, tried to buy a big money winning team.

His first season (1981) was successful, as he rushed for 952 yards and was the Alouettes rookie of the year. His second season, with the newly renamed and dreadful Montreal Concordes, was plagued by injury, and he only gained 190 yards rushing.

He agreed to return to the Dolphins in 1983, and showed much promise, rushing for 392 yards in 14 games with a 4.6 yards per carry average.

Overstreet was killed in a car accident in June 1984. He was driving northbound in his 1980 Mercedes on Texas State Highway 155, when his car swerved off the road about 10 miles northeast of Tyler into gasoline pumps at a service station and exploded. The Dolphins wore a helmet decal with the number 20 in his memory during their 1984 season in which they reached Super Bowl XIX.

He was survived by his wife, Johnnie, and son, David Overstreet II, who is currently an NFL assistant coach, first with Indianapolis and later Chicago, and grand-nephew Jalen Overstreet.

== Statistics ==
Overstreet's stats with the Oklahoma Sooners
	Rushing					Receiving				
YEAR	ATT	YDS	AVG	LNG	TD	NO.	YDS	AVG	LNG	TD
1977	80	354	4.4	—	3	—	—	—	—	—
1978	63	408	6.5	64	2	—	—	—	—	—
1979	56	277	5.0	21	2	2	82	41.0	72	1
1980	96	678	7.1	84	6	3	80	26.7	39	1
Totals	295	1,717	5.8	84	13	5	162	32.4	72	2

Overstreet's stats in the CFL (Montreal Alouettes)
	Rushing					Receiving				
YEAR	ATT	YDS	AVG	LNG	TD	NO.	YDS	AVG	LNG	TD
1981	182	952	5.2	54	3	48	356	7.4	26	1
1982	39	190	4.9	35	0	17	89	5.2	13	0
Totals	221	1,142	5.2	54	3	65	445	6.8	26	1

Overstreet's stats in the NFL
	Rushing						Receiving				
YEAR	TEAM	ATT	YDS	AVG	LNG	TD	NO.	YDS	AVG	LNG	TD
1983	MIA	85	392	4.6	44	1	8	59	7.4	20	2
Totals	—	85	392	4.6	44	1	8	59	7.4	20	2

== See also ==
- List of gridiron football players who died during their careers
