= Celina Independent School District =

School district in Texas, United States

Location
- Celina, TX ESC Region 10 United States

District information
- Type: Public
- Motto: Paving the Way for the Future
- Grades: Pre-K through 12
- Superintendent: Tom Maglisceau

Students and staff
- Athletic conference: UIL Class 4A
- Colors: Orange and White

Other information
- Mascot: Bobcats
- Website: www.celinaisd.com

Celina Independent School District (CISD) is a public school district based in Celina, Texas, United States.

== Location ==
In addition to Celina, the district serves a portion of Weston. Located in Collin County, a small portion of the district extends into Denton County.

== History ==
2006 - Celina Elementary moves to its new campus at 550 S. Utah Dr.

2007 - Celina Intermediate is established in the former CES building at 507 E. Malone St, housing grades 3-5. CES realigns to host grades PK-2.

2009 - Celina High School moves to its new campus at the site of the historic Alma School. Celina Middle School moves to former CHS campus at 710 E. Pecan St.

2014 - Celina Junior High is established at 710 E. Pecan St. with grades 7-8. Celina Middle School (5-6) returns to 706 E. Pecan St. campus and is realigned along with Celina Intermediate (3-4).

2017 - O'Dell Elementary opens. Celina Intermediate closes and is replaced by Celina Primary School (grades PK-K) at 507 E Malone. The Celina Sixth Grade Center is established at 706 E. Pecan St, replacing Celina Middle School. Both elementary schools host grades 1-5.

2020 - Celina Elementary is renamed Lykins Elementary.

2022 - Moore Middle School opens with grades 6-8. Celina JH and Celina Sixth Grade Center are repurposed.

2023 - Martin Elementary opens. Celina Primary is renamed Celina Early Childhood School, with Kindergarten returning to zoned elementary schools.

2024 - Bothwell Elementary opens.

2025 - Vasquez Elementary opens.

2026 - Willard Middle School opens with grades 5-6. Elementary schools (PK-4) and Moore Middle School (7-8) are realigned.

2027 - Three new elementary campuses are expected to open.

2028 - The new Lykins Early Childhood Center is scheduled to open at the site of Lykins Elementary. This will allow the district to rezone elementary schools to grades K-5 and middle schools to grades 6-8.

== Sports ==
Celina High School's mascot is the Bobcat and the high school is best known for its dominating football program – it has nine state championships, tied for the third most among 11-man programs in Texas (1974, 1995, 1998, 1999, 2000, 2001, 2005, 2007, and 2024). The 1974 title was in Class B (now Class A) and was a co-championship with Big Sandy High School (one of the all-time dominant teams), the 2007 title was in Class AAA, and the 2024 title was in Class AAAA; the other six titles were in Class AA.

Celina High School is also home to many other programs; the baseball team has also won a state title (2002 in Class AA).

== Music ==
The CISD fine arts program offers both visual and performing arts opportunities to students, such as band, choir, dance along with others. Each year student groups qualify for state sweepstakes and national awards.

== Ratings ==
In 2009, the school district was rated "recognized" by the Texas Education Agency.

In 2010, the school district was rated Exemplary.

== Schools ==
Secondary Schools
School name	Grades	Year Founded	Additional information
Celina High School	9-12		relocated in 2009
Moore Middle School	7-8	2022	Grades 6-8 from 2022-2026
Willard Middle School	5-6	2026	

Primary Schools
School name	Grades	Year Founded	Additional information
Bothwell Elementary School	PK-4	2024	ES #4; Grades K-5 from 2024-2026
Lykins Elementary School	PK-4		Current facility opened in 2006; Renamed from Celina Elementary in 2020; Grades PK-2 until 2017, 1-5 from 2017-2023, K-5 from 2023-2026
Martin Elementary School	PK-4	2023	ES #3; Grades K-5 from 2023-2026
O'Dell Elementary School	PK-4	2017	ES #2; Grades 1-5 from 2017-2023, K-5 from 2023-2026
Vasquez Elementary School	PK-4	2025	ES #5; Grades K-5 from 2025-2026

Future Facilities
School name	Grades	Capacity	Projected Opening	Additional information
Scott Elementary School	PK-5	750	2027	Elementary School #6
Grumbles Elementary School	PK-5	750	2027	Elementary School #7
Calvert Elementary School	PK-5	750	2027	Elementary School #8
Operations Center	N/A		2028	
Lykins Early Childhood Center	PK	750	2028	To be built on site of Lykins Elementary
Unnamed Elementary School	K-5	750	2028	Elementary School #9
Unnamed High School	9-8	3000	2029	High School #2
Unnamed Elementary School	K-5	750	2030	Elementary School #10
Unnamed Elementary School	K-5	750	2030	Elementary School #11
Unnamed Middle School	6-8	1500	2031	Middle School #3
Unnamed Elementary School	K-5	750	2031	Elementary School #12
Unnamed Elementary School	K-5	750	2031	Elementary School #13
Unnamed Middle School	6-8	1500	2033	Middle School #4

Former Facilities
School name	Year Founded	Year Closed	Additional information
Alla School	1896		Location is current site of Celina HS.
Celina ISD Administration Building			Building opened in 1906. Replaced in 1916 and again in 1943.
Bobcat Stadium	1952	2018	Currently called Historic Bobcat Field.
Celina Junior High School	2014	2022	Grades 7-8
Celina Middle School		2017	Housed in 706 E Pecan St. building until 2009, when it relocated to 710 E. Pecan St; Grades 6-8 until 2014, 5-6 until 2017
Celina 6th Grade Center	2017	2022	Housed in 706 E Pecan St. building, replacing Celina Middle School. Building currently operates as Student Opportunity Center.
Celina Intermediate School	2007	2017	Housed in Malone St. building; Grades 3-5 until 2014, 3-4 from 2014-2017
Celina Early Childhood School	2017	2026	Housted in Malone St. building; Grades PK-K from 2017-2023, PK from 2023-2026; Was named Celina Primary School until 2023
