= Celina, Texas =

- City
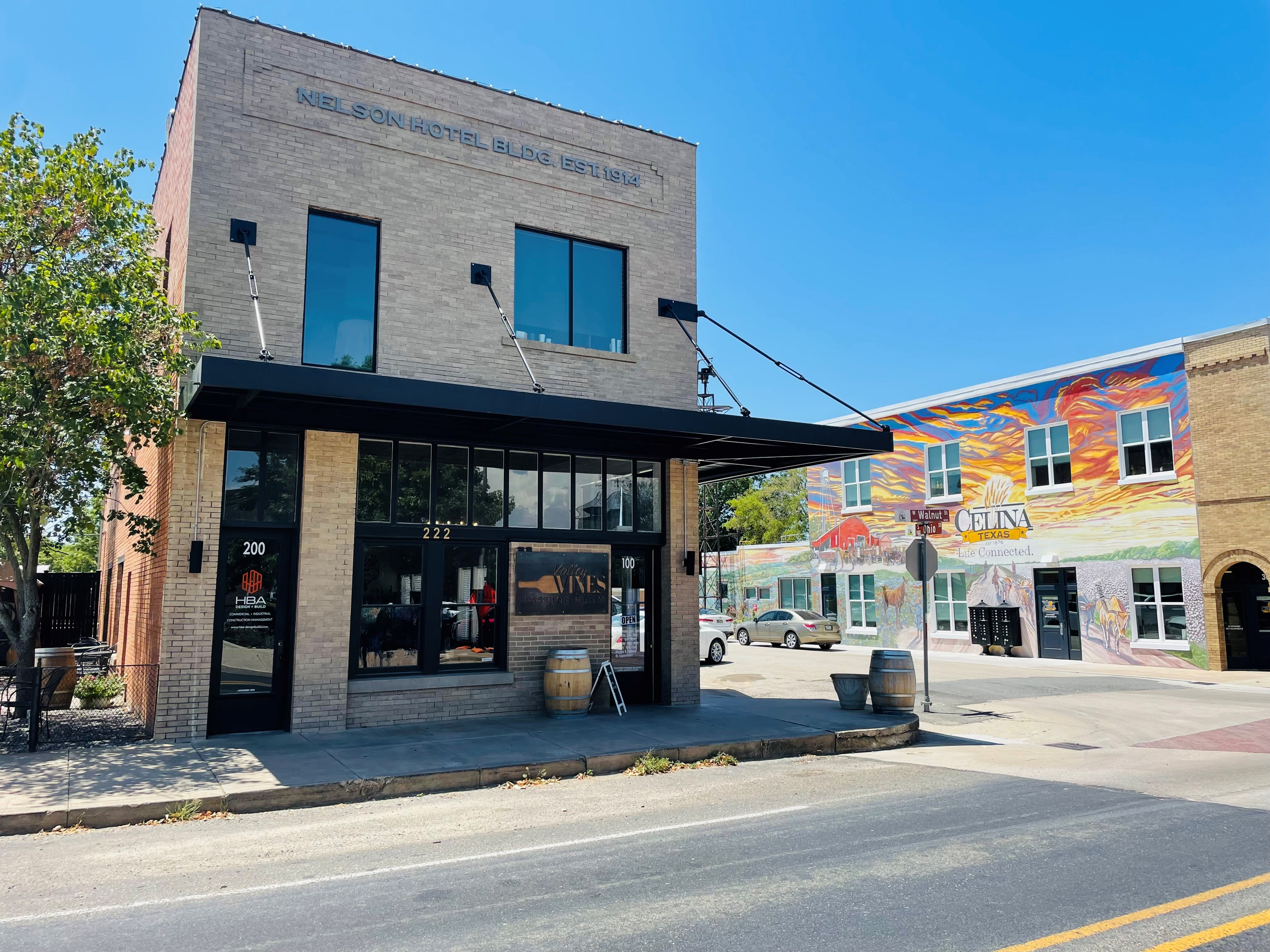
- Downtown Celina

- Location of Celina in Collin County, Texas
- Coordinates: 33°19′09″N 96°47′44″W
- Country: United States
- State: Texas
- County: Collin, Denton
- Established: 1876
- Founded: October 1879
- Incorporated: 1907
- Named for: Celina, Tennessee

Area
  - Total: 48.216 sq mi (124.879 km^{2})
  - Land: 47.725 sq mi (123.607 km^{2})
  - Water: 0.492 sq mi (1.273 km^{2})
- Elevation: 673 ft (205 m)

Population (2020)
  - Total: 16,739
  - Estimate (2025): 64,427
  - Rank: US: 930th TX: 81st
  - Density: 891/sq mi (343.9/km^{2})
- Time zone: UTC–6 (Central (CST))
  - Summer (DST): UTC–5 (CDT)
- ZIP Code: 75009
- Area codes: 214, 469, 972, 945
- FIPS code: 48-13684
- GNIS feature ID: 2409421
- Sales tax: 8.25%
- Website: celina-tx.gov

Celina (/sɪˈlaɪnə/ sil-EYE-nə) is a city in Collin and Denton counties in the U.S. state of Texas. Celina is part of the Dallas–Fort Worth metroplex.

The population was 16,739 at the 2020 census, and according to 2025 census estimates, the city is estimated to have a population of 64,427.

The Dallas Business Journal has ranked Celina as the fastest-growing city in the Dallas–Fort Worth metroplex for three consecutive years (2019-2021). The population growth rate of Celina was 50.8% from 2015 to 2019. Celina's maximum project buildout population is approximately 378,000.

Celina is the 1st gigabit city in the State of Texas and was recognized by Texas Governor Greg Abbott in May 2022. In 2017, Celina passed a gigabit city ordinance, which was an innovative initiative to provide fiber, gigabit internet speed to all of its residential homes. As of 2021, approximately 9,300 homes have high speed fiber internet, and residents have pure fiber network with unlimited data usage and speeds of 1,000 megabits per second.

== History ==
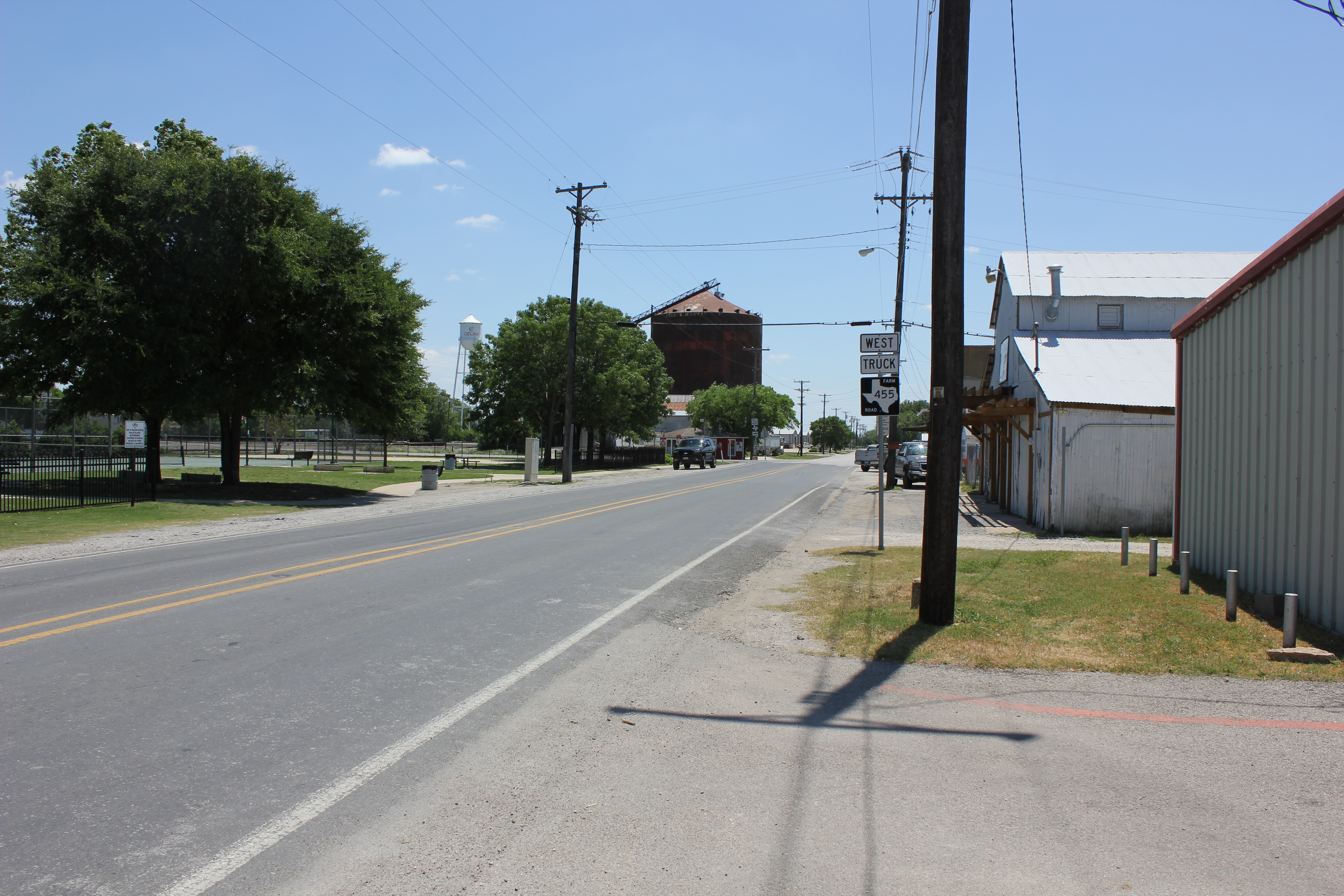
North Louisiana Drive in Celina, 2013

Although Celina was not established until 1876, settlers came into the area at a much earlier date. In October 1879, a settlement formed 1 mi (1.6 km) south of its current location. A Methodist church was built in 1880, and it doubled as a schoolhouse for a short time. Celina's first postmaster John T. Mulkey renamed the town after his hometown – Celina, Tennessee. By 1884, Celina had a gristmill, cotton gin, school, several general stores, and a drug store that has been opened in “Old Celina.”

In 1902, news had reached Celina that the St. Louis, San Francisco, and Texas Railway would be constructed and extended to reach the area. Shortly thereafter, the merchants of the town made the decision to move the entire town closer to the railway. When the time came to move, the businesses and houses were loaded onto rollers and moved 1 mi (1.6 km) north to be closer to the railway. The town coined itself “Rollertown.” The move was completed in February 1902.

A town site company secured land for the new “Celina,” which was part of a pasture belonging to the late William Willock. The company had taken fences down, marked off streets, and placed lots for sale. Originally, it was intended that the current Main Street would be the Main Street of the town so it was made wider than the other streets and the price of lots were higher. Because of the higher price, the merchants began locating north of Main Street and west of the railroad. In 1907, the town was officially incorporated with Will Newsom serving as the first mayor.

In 1910, Celina resident J. Fred Smith (who later became the first mayor of University Park in Dallas) had the business section rebuilt from a row of frame buildings facing the railroad tracks to uniform brick buildings around a square. By July 1911, Smith's effort had paid off as several new buildings were ready for use and gravel streets were constructed, which gave Celina the appearance of a wide-awake, growing little city. Businesses began to relocate from their wooden structures into the new brick buildings, and many of the wooden structures moved into a residential section and transformed into homes. This was a pivotal moment in Celina's character as it marked the shift towards the brick features that define the Downtown Square today.

Celina Pike, the first road in the county built exclusively for automobiles, opened in Celina in 1915. At that time, Celina had a newspaper, two banks, and municipal water works. In 1921, Lone Star Gas organized Farmers Gas Company to provide natural gas to Celina and other small rural towns. In 1924, Texas Power and Light began supplying electricity to Celina then replaced by Grayson-Collin Electric Cooperative in 1937.

By 1937, Celina had a variety of businesses and professional services, including a dry good store, seven gas stations, three cotton gins, two drug stores, two grain elevators, two ice houses, flour mill, laundry, lumber yard, shoe and harness shop, jewelry store, blacksmith, movie theatre, and a modern brick school building. During World War II, the diversification of commerce in the Downtown Square continued as it served as a collection points for scrap iron.

== Geography ==
Celina is located in Collin County and Denton County. Celina is centered mostly on State Highway 289 with its downtown located west of the state highway. The Dallas North Tollway will be located to the west of the city.

According to the United States Census Bureau, the city has a total area of 48.216 square miles (124.88 km^{2}), of which 47.725 square miles (123.61 km^{2}) is land and 0.491 square miles (1.27 km^{2}) is water.

The total boundary of the city, including parts of the city that are not in its limits, is 78 mi^{2} (200 km^{2}).

=== Climate ===
The climate in this area is characterized by hot, humid summers and generally mild to cool winters. According to the Koppen Climate Classification System, Celina has a humid subtropical climate, abbreviated “Cfa” on climate maps.

== Demographics ==
Historical population
Census	Pop.	Note	%±
1910	724		—
1920	1,126		55.5%
1930	948		−15.8%
1940	994		4.9%
1950	1,051		5.7%
1960	1,204		14.6%
1970	1,272		5.6%
1980	1,520		19.5%
1990	1,737		14.3%
2000	1,861		7.1%
2010	6,028		223.9%
2020	16,739		177.7%
2025 (est.)	64,427		284.9%
U.S. Decennial Census; 2020 Census

=== Racial and ethnic composition ===
Celina city, Texas – Racial and ethnic composition Note: the US Census treats Hispanic/Latino as an ethnic category. This table excludes Latinos from the racial categories and assigns them to a separate category. Hispanics/Latinos may be of any race.
Race / Ethnicity (NH = Non-Hispanic)	Pop 2000	Pop 2010	Pop 2020	% 2000	% 2010	% 2020
White alone (NH)	1,243	4,413	11,034	66.79%	73.21%	65.92%
Black or African American alone (NH)	167	234	1,228	8.97%	3.88%	7.34%
Native American or Alaska Native alone (NH)	5	35	84	0.27%	0.58%	0.50%
Asian alone (NH)	2	29	571	0.11%	0.48%	3.41%
Native Hawaiian or Pacific Islander alone (NH)	0	0	11	0.00%	0.00%	0.07%
Other race alone (NH)	0	3	57	0.00%	0.05%	0.34%
Mixed race or Multiracial (NH)	21	77	832	1.13%	1.28%	4.97%
Hispanic or Latino (any race)	423	1,237	2,922	22.73%	20.52%	17.46%
Total	1,861	6,028	16,739	100.00%	100.00%	100.00%

=== 2020 census ===
As of the 2020 census, Celina had a population of 16,739 residents, 4,983 households, and 4,374 families. The population density was 518.8 inhabitants per square mile (200.3/km^{2}), and there were 5,421 housing units.

As of the 2020 census, the median age was 33.7 years, 33.4% of residents were under the age of 18, and 8.2% were 65 years of age or older. For every 100 females there were 97.3 males, and for every 100 females age 18 and over there were 92.6 males age 18 and over.

58.2% of residents lived in urban areas, while 41.8% lived in rural areas.

As of the 2020 census, 57.3% of households had children under the age of 18 living in them, 75.2% were married couples living together, 7.6% were households with a male householder and no spouse or partner present, and 12.9% were households with a female householder and no spouse or partner present. About 9.1% of households were made up of individuals and 3.3% had someone living alone who was 65 years of age or older. The average household size was 3.3 persons.

Of the 5,421 housing units, 8.1% were vacant, 86.0% were owner-occupied, and 14.0% were renter-occupied. The homeowner vacancy rate was 5.0% and the rental vacancy rate was 6.9%.

=== Historical population ===
The population of Celina was 150 in 1884, but declined to 50 by 1892. The first year that the United States Census Bureau counted the population of Celina came in 1910 with 724. By 1920, Celina had grown to 1,126 residents, but declined to 994 in 1940. Celina has grown steadily after World War II until the significant population increase beginning in 2010.

As reflected by Census figures between 2010-20, Celina’s White population showed both an absolute and proportional increase, in contrast to the vast majority of the country and Dallas-Forth Worth Metroplex.

== Education ==
Most of the city is in Celina Independent School District while the southern portions are in Prosper Independent School District.

Schools operated by Celina ISD include Celina High School, Moore Middle School, Celina Primary School, Lykins Elementary School, and O’Dell Elementary School. Schools operated by Prosper ISD include Boyer Elementary School, Johnson Elementary School, Light Farms Elementary School, and Lilyana Elementary School.

The Texas Legislature designated Collin College as the community college for all of Collin County including Celina ISD, in addition to parts of Denton County. Most parts of Denton County, including the Prosper ISD covering Celina, are in the zone for North Central Texas College. Collin College – Celina Campus officially opened in Fall 2021.

In Celina, 48% of the population has a degree in higher education (bachelor's degree, master's degree, post-graduate degree) while 28% has some college education, 20% has a high school degree, and 4% has no degree.

== Government ==
Celina is a home-rule municipality, governed by a mayor and city council who are elected by the residents. The city was established in 1876.

=== City Council ===
- Ryan Tubbs, Mayor
- Philip Ferguson, Place 1
- Eddie Cawlfield, Place 2
- Andy Hopkins, Mayor Pro Tem, Place 3
- Wendie Wigginton, Place 4
- Mindy Koehne, Deputy Mayor Pro Tem, Place 5
- Brandon Grumbles, Place 6
- Robert Ranc, City Manager

== Special events ==
Celina is known for hosting events that bring the community together. Each year, Celina hosts over 25 events with the majority of them occurring on the Historic Downtown Square. The city hosts four main events: Cajun Fest (May), Splash & Blast (July), Beware! Of the Square (October), Christmas on the Square (November). In addition, the city hosts Friday Night Markets once a month from March to November.

== Notable people ==
- Craig James, NFL player, sportscaster and 2012 U.S. Senate candidate
- Ryan Merritt, Major League Baseball pitcher and former Celina Bobcat
